= 2014 All England Super Series Premier =

Badminton championships

Tournament details
- Dates: 4–9 March
- Edition: 104th
- Level: Super Series Premier
- Total prize money: US$400,000
- Venue: National Indoor Arena
- Location: Birmingham, England

Champions
- Men's singles: (Malaysia) Lee Chong Wei
- Women's singles: (China) Wang Shixian
- Men's doubles: (Indonesia) Mohammad Ahsan (Indonesia) Hendra Setiawan
- Women's doubles: (China) Wang Xiaoli (China) Yu Yang
- Mixed doubles: (Indonesia) Tontowi Ahmad (Indonesia) Liliyana Natsir

The 2014 All England Super Series Premier was the third super series tournament of the 2014 BWF Super Series. The tournament took place in Birmingham, England from 4 to 9 March 2014 and had a total purse of $400,000. A qualification draw occurred to fill four places in all five disciplines of the main draws.

== Men's singles ==
=== Seeds ===
1. (Malaysia) Lee Chong Wei (champion)
2. (China) Chen Long (final)
3. (Indonesia) Tommy Sugiarto (first round)
4. (Denmark) Jan Ø. Jørgensen (first round)
5. (Japan) Kenichi Tago (quarterfinals)
6. (Thailand) Boonsak Ponsana (second round)
7. (China) Du Pengyu (first round)
8. (Vietnam) Nguyen Tien Minh (first round)

=== Top half ===
First round
1	(Malaysia) Lee C W	21	21
(Thailand) T Saensomboonsuk	15	17
(Germany) M Zwiebler	18	19
(Malaysia) Chong W F	21	21
7	(China) Du PY	16	21	14
(England) R Ouseph	21	11	21
(India) K. Srikanth	11	15
(Japan) K Momota	21	21
4	(Denmark) J Ø Jørgensen	8	18
(South Korea) Son W-h	21	21
(Indonesia) D H Rumbaka	21	21
(Netherlands) E Pang	18	17
5	(Japan) K Tago	14	21	21
(India) K Parupalli	21	19	17
(Chinese Taipei) Chou T-c	21	21
Q2	(Malaysia) M R M Misbun	15	10

Second round
1	(Malaysia) Lee C W	21	21
(Malaysia) Chong W F	6	12
(England) R Ouseph	15	10
(Japan) K Momota	21	21
(South Korea) Son W-h	21	14	21
(Indonesia) D H Rumbaka	16	21	10
5	(Japan) K Tago	21	21
(Chinese Taipei) Chou T-c	19	15

Quarter-finals
1	(Malaysia) Lee C W	21	21
(Japan) K Momota	14	18
(South Korea) Son W-h	21	21
5	(Japan) K Tago	15	17

Semi-finals
1	(Malaysia) Lee C W	14	21	21
(South Korea) Son W-h	21	19	15

=== Bottom half ===
First round
Q1	(Singapore) Z L D Wong	20	21	20
(Japan) S Sasaki	22	7	22
Q4	(South Korea) Lee D-k	17	21	21
8	(Vietnam) Nguyen T M	21	16	16
(Indonesia) S D Kuncoro	11	10
(China) Wang ZM	21	21
Q3	(China) Gao H	21	10	21
3	(Indonesia) T Sugiarto	13	21	18
(Denmark) H-K Vittinghus	15	23	21
(China) Tian HW	21	21	11
(Hong Kong) Hu Y	7	19
6	(Thailand) B Ponsana	21	21
(Chinese Taipei) Hsu J-h	12	11
(Japan) T Ueda	21	21
(Denmark) V Axelsen	21	15	12
2	(China) Chen L	10	21	21

Second round
(Japan) S Sasaki	19	16
Q4	(South Korea) Lee D-k	21	21
(China) Wang ZM	21	21
Q3	(China) Gao H	19	17
(Denmark) H-K Vittinghus	18	21	21
6	(Thailand) B Ponsana	21	12	19
(Japan) T Ueda	14	20
2	(China) Chen L	21	22

Quarter-finals
Q4	(South Korea) Lee D-k	13	21	17
(China) Wang ZM	21	16	21
(Denmark) H-K Vittinghus	21	11	14
2	(China) Chen L	18	21	21

Semi-finals
(China) Wang ZM	17	14
2	(China) Chen L	21	21

=== Finals ===
Semi-finals
1	(Malaysia) Lee Chong Wei	14	21	21
(South Korea) Shon Wan-ho	21	19	15
(China) Wang Zhengming	17	14
2	(China) Chen Long	21	21

Final
1	(Malaysia) Lee Chong Wei	21	21
2	(China) Chen Long	13	18

== Women's singles ==
=== Seeds ===
1. (China) Li Xuerui (final)
2. (China) Wang Yihan (semifinals)
3. (Thailand) Ratchanok Intanon (semifinals)
4. (China) Wang Shixian (champion)
5. (South Korea) Sung Ji-hyun (quarterfinals)
6. (South Korea) Bae Yeon-ju (quarterfinals)
7. (India) Saina Nehwal (quarterfinals)
8. (Chinese Taipei) Tai Tzu-ying (first round)

=== Top half ===
First round
1	(China) Li Xuerui	21	15	22
(Thailand) B Ongbumrungpan	14	21	20
(Hong Kong) Yip P Y	21	7	24
(Japan) M Mitani	17	21	26
5	(South Korea) Sung J-h	21	21
(Spain) B Corrales	12	14
(Indonesia) L Fanetri	21	15	21
Q4	(Czech Republic) K Gavnholt	13	21	18
3	(Thailand) R Intanon	20	21	21
(Singapore) Gu J	22	15	18
(China) Han L	21	21
(Thailand) N Jindapon	11	19
8	(Chinese Taipei) Tai T-y	20	20
(Canada) M Li	22	22
(Indonesia) B Manuputty	21	21
(Bulgaria) P Nedelcheva	16	8

Second round
1	(China) Li Xuerui	14	21	21
(Japan) M Mitani	21	19	15
5	(South Korea) Sung J-h	23	21
(Indonesia) L Fanetri	21	11
3	(Thailand) R Intanon	18	21	21
(China) Han L	21	14	11
(Canada) M Li	21	21	21
(Indonesia) B Manuputty	15	23	16

Quarter-finals
1	(China) Li Xuerui	21	21
5	(South Korea) Sung J-h	17	18
3	(Thailand) R Intanon	23	21
(Canada) M Li	21	16

Semi-finals
1	(China) Li Xuerui	21	21
3	(Thailand) R Intanon	18	8

=== Bottom half ===
First round
(Germany) J Schenk	w	/	o
Q2	(United States) Zhang BW
(Scotland) K Gilmour	15	6
7	(India) S Nehwal	21	21
Q1	(Republic of Ireland) C Magee	22	21
Q3	(Chinese Taipei) Hsu Y-c	20	16
(Japan) E Hirose	20	18
4	(China) Wang SX	22	21
(Thailand) P Buranaprasertsuk	21	21
(Hong Kong) Chan T K	14	17
(Japan) S Takahashi	21	14	18
6	(South Korea) Bae Y-j	18	21	21
(India) P.V. Sindhu	16	15
(China) Sun Y	21	21
(Spain) C Marín	13	12
2	(China) Wang YH	21	21

Second round
Q2	(United States) Zhang BW	22	21	19
7	(India) S Nehwal	24	18	21
Q1	(Republic of Ireland) C Magee	15	12
4	(China) Wang SX	21	21
(Thailand) P Buranaprasertsuk	11	21	13
6	(South Korea) Bae Y-j	21	19	21
(China) Sun Y	11	14
2	(China) Wang YH	21	21

Quarter-finals
7	(India) S Nehwal	17	10
4	(China) Wang SX	21	21
6	(South Korea) Bae Y-j	8	13
2	(China) Wang YH	21	21

Semi-finals
4	(China) Wang SX	21	21
2	(China) Wang YH	8	15

=== Finals ===
Semi-finals
1	(China) Li Xuerui	21	21
3	(Thailand) Ratchanok Intanon	18	8
4	(China) Wang Shixian	21	21
2	(China) Wang Yihan	8	15

Final
1	(China) Li Xuerui	19	18
4	(China) Wang Shixian	21	21

== Men's doubles ==
=== Seeds ===
1. (Indonesia) Mohammad Ahsan / Hendra Setiawan (champion)
2. (Japan) Hiroyuki Endo / Kenichi Hayakawa (final)
3. (Denmark) Mathias Boe / Carsten Mogensen (second round)
4. (China) Liu Xiaolong / Qiu Zihan (first round)
5. (Malaysia) Hoon Thien How / Tan Wee Kiong (quarterfinals)
6. (Indonesia) Angga Pratama / Rian Agung Saputro (quarterfinals)
7. (Chinese Taipei) Lee Sheng-mu / Tsai Chia-hsin (quarterfinals)
8. (England) Chris Adcock / Andrew Ellis (second round)

=== Top half ===
First round
1	(Indonesia) M Ahsan (Indonesia) H Setiawan	21	21
(Russia) V Ivanov (Russia) I Sozonov	14	18
(England) C Langridge (England) P Mills	21	21
Q2	(England) M Ellis (England) T Wolfenden	15	16
8	(England) C Adcock (England) A Ellis	18	21	22
(Chinese Taipei) Liang J-w (Chinese Taipei) Liao K-h	21	13	20
Q3	(China) Fu HF (China) Zhang N	21	21
(China) Cai Y (China) Lu K	10	16
3	(Denmark) M Boe (Denmark) C Mogensen	23	21
(Malaysia) Goh V S (Malaysia) Lim K W	21	11
(Indonesia) W Nayaka (Indonesia) A Yusuf	15	21	19
(Indonesia) M F Gideon (Indonesia) M Kido	21	19	21
5	(Malaysia) Hoon T H (Malaysia) Tan W K	19	21	21
Q4	(Hong Kong) Chan Y L (Hong Kong) Lee C H	21	13	4
(Japan) H Hashimoto (Japan) N Hirata	21	21
(Poland) A Cwałina (Poland) P Wacha	17	14

Second round
1	(Indonesia) M Ahsan (Indonesia) H Setiawan	8	21	21
(England) C Langridge (England) P Mills	21	17	14
8	(England) C Adcock (England) A Ellis	12	10
Q3	(China) Fu HF (China) Zhang N	21	21
3	(Denmark) M Boe (Denmark) C Mogensen	18	12
(Indonesia) M F Gideon (Indonesia) M Kido	21	21
5	(Malaysia) Hoon T H (Malaysia) Tan W K	25	20	21
(Japan) H Hashimoto (Japan) N Hirata	23	22	14

Quarter-finals
1	(Indonesia) M Ahsan (Indonesia) H Setiawan	23	22
Q3	(China) Fu HF (China) Zhang N	21	20
(Indonesia) M F Gideon (Indonesia) M Kido	21	21
5	(Malaysia) Hoon T H (Malaysia) Tan W K	18	12

Semi-finals
1	(Indonesia) M Ahsan (Indonesia) H Setiawan	21	21
(Indonesia) M F Gideon (Indonesia) M Kido	7	12

=== Bottom half ===
First round
(Netherlands) R Bosch (Netherlands) K Ridder	15	11
(Denmark) M Conrad-Petersen (Denmark) M Pieler Kolding	21	21
(Japan) T Kamura (Japan) K Sonoda	17	19
7	(Chinese Taipei) Lee S-m (Chinese Taipei) Tsai C-h	21	21
(Poland) Ł Moren (Poland) W Szkudlarczyk	14	17
(South Korea) Ko S-h (South Korea) Shin B-c	21	21
(Denmark) A Skårup Rasmussen (Denmark) K Astrup Sorensen	21	21
4	(China) Liu XL (China) Qiu ZH	12	9
(Thailand) M Jongjit (Thailand) N Puangpuapech	12	14
(China) Chai B (China) Hong W	21	21
Q1	(England) P Briggs (England) H Towler	22	18	11
6	(Indonesia) A Pratama (Indonesia) R A Saputro	20	21	21
(Germany) M Fuchs (Germany) J Schöttler	21	21
(Indonesia) B Angriawan (Indonesia) R K Suwardi	13	17
(China) Kang J (China) Liu C	21	6	10
2	(Japan) H Endo (Japan) K Hayakawa	13	21	21

Second round
(Denmark) M Conrad-Petersen (Denmark) M Pieler Kolding	13	21	18
7	(Chinese Taipei) Lee S-m (Chinese Taipei) Tsai C-h	21	16	21
(South Korea) Ko S-h (South Korea) Shin B-c	21	21
(Denmark) A Skårup Rasmussen (Denmark) K Astrup Sorensen	8	8
(China) Chai B (China) Hong W	21	20	19
6	(Indonesia) A Pratama (Indonesia) R A Saputro	8	22	21
(Germany) M Fuchs (Germany) J Schöttler	13	20
2	(Japan) H Endo (Japan) K Hayakawa	21	22

Quarter-finals
7	(Chinese Taipei) Lee S-m (Chinese Taipei) Tsai C-h	17	21	14
(South Korea) Ko S-h (South Korea) Shin B-c	21	19	21
6	(Indonesia) A Pratama (Indonesia) R A Saputro	20	21	19
2	(Japan) H Endo (Japan) K Hayakawa	22	15	21

Semi-finals
(South Korea) Ko S-h (South Korea) Shin B-c	21	17	13
2	(Japan) H Endo (Japan) K Hayakawa	16	21	21

=== Finals ===
Semi-finals
1	(Indonesia) Mohammad Ahsan (Indonesia) Hendra Setiawan	21	21
(Indonesia) Marcus Fernaldi Gideon (Indonesia) Markis Kido	7	12
(South Korea) Ko Sung-hyun (South Korea) Shin Baek-cheol	21	17	13
2	(Japan) Hiroyuki Endo (Japan) Kenichi Hayakawa	16	21	21

Final
1	(Indonesia) Mohammad Ahsan (Indonesia) Hendra Setiawan	21	21
2	(Japan) Hiroyuki Endo (Japan) Kenichi Hayakawa	19	19

== Women's doubles ==
=== Seeds ===
1. (China) Wang Xiaoli / Yu Yang (champion)
2. (Denmark) Christinna Pedersen / Kamilla Rytter Juhl (second round)
3. (Japan) Misaki Matsutomo / Ayaka Takahashi (semifinals)
4. (China) Bao Yixin / Tang Jinhua (second round)
5. (China) Tian Qing / Zhao Yunlei (semifinals)
6. (South Korea) Jung Kyung-eun / Kim Ha-na (second round)
7. (Indonesia) Pia Zebadiah Bernadeth / Rizki Amelia Pradipta (quarter-finals)
8. (South Korea) Jang Ye-na / Kim So-young (quarter-finals)

=== Top half ===
First round
1	(China) Wang XL (China) Yu Y	21	21
(United States) E Lee (United States) P L Obanana	8	5
Q1	(Indonesia) S R Andini (Indonesia) T R Nuraidah	11	21	21
(Scotland) I Bankier (Bulgaria) P Nedelcheva	21	16	17
8	(South Korea) Jang Y-n (South Korea) Kim S-y	21	13	21
Q2	(Germany) I Herttrich (Germany) C Nelte	8	21	15
(Thailand) D Aroonkesorn (Thailand) K Voravichitchaikul	21	21
(Canada) N Grether (Canada) C Reid	15	11
4	(China) Bao YX (China) Tang JH	21	21
(Thailand) P Supajirakul (Thailand) S Taerattanachai	9	15
Q3	(Hong Kong) Chau H W (Hong Kong) Poon L Y	17	21
(Japan) R Kakiiwa (Japan) M Maeda	21	23
5	(China) Tian Q (China) Zhao YL	21	21
PFQ	(Chinese Taipei) Cheng W-h (Chinese Taipei) Hsieh P-c	13	18
(Indonesia) A S Awanda (Indonesia) D D Haris	21	21
(Japan) M Aratama (Japan) M Taruno	18	19

Second round
1	(China) Wang XL (China) Yu Y	21	21
Q1	(Indonesia) S R Andini (Indonesia) T R Nuraidah	13	8
8	(South Korea) Jang Y-n (South Korea) Kim S-y	21	21
(Thailand) D Aroonkesorn (Thailand) K Voravichitchaikul	16	7
4	(China) Bao YX (China) Tang JH	16	23	17
(Japan) R Kakiiwa (Japan) M Maeda	21	21	21
5	(China) Tian Q (China) Zhao YL	21	21
(Indonesia) A S Awanda (Indonesia) D D Haris	13	11

Quarter-finals
1	(China) Wang XL (China) Yu Y	21	21
8	(South Korea) Jang Y-n (South Korea) Kim S-y	9	14
(Japan) R Kakiiwa (Japan) M Maeda	20	15
5	(China) Tian Q (China) Zhao YL	22	21

Semi-finals
1	(China) Wang XL (China) Yu Y	21	21
5	(China) Tian Q (China) Zhao YL	17	12

=== Bottom half ===
First round
(Netherlands) E Muskens (Netherlands) S Piek	17	21	15
(England) G Adcock (England) L Smith	21	13	21
(Thailand) S Amitrapai (Thailand) L Narissapat	18	19
7	(Indonesia) P Z Bernadeth (Indonesia) R A Pradipta	21	21
(England) H Olver (England) K Robertshaw	10	18
(Malaysia) K M V Hoo (Malaysia) Woon K W	21	21
(Malaysia) Ng H E (Malaysia) Ng H L	0^{r}
3	(Japan) M Matsutomo (Japan) A Takahashi	1
(South Korea) Lee S-h (South Korea) Shin S-c	21	21	21
(Denmark) L Damkjær Kruse (Denmark) M Rœpke	14	23	17
(China) Luo Y (China) Luo Y	23	22
6	(South Korea) Jung K-e (South Korea) Kim H-n	25	24
Q4	(China) Ma J (China) Tang YT	21	21
(Indonesia) N Krishinda Maheswari (Indonesia) G Polii	13	12
(Singapore) S M Sari (Singapore) Yao L	15	15
2	(Denmark) C Pedersen (Denmark) K Rytter Juhl	21	21

Second round
(England) G Adcock (England) L Smith	17	14
7	(Indonesia) P Z Bernadeth (Indonesia) R A Pradipta	21	21
(Malaysia) K M V Hoo (Malaysia) Woon K W	15	11
3	(Japan) M Matsutomo (Japan) A Takahashi	21	21
(South Korea) Lee S-h (South Korea) Shin S-c	21	15	21
6	(South Korea) Jung K-e (South Korea) Kim H-n	16	21	14
Q4	(China) Ma J (China) Tang YT	17	21	21
2	(Denmark) C Pedersen (Denmark) K Rytter Juhl	21	9	8

Quarter-finals
7	(Indonesia) P Z Bernadeth (Indonesia) R A Pradipta	21	9	18
3	(Japan) M Matsutomo (Japan) A Takahashi	16	21	21
(South Korea) Lee S-h (South Korea) Shin S-c	17	21	17
Q4	(China) Ma J (China) Tang YT	21	12	21

Semi-finals
3	(Japan) M Matsutomo (Japan) A Takahashi	17	12
Q4	(China) Ma J (China) Tang YT	21	21

=== Finals ===
Semi-finals
1	(China) Wang Xiaoli (China) Yu Yang	21	21
5	(China) Tian Qing (China) Zhao Yunlei	17	12
3	(Japan) Misaki Matsutomo (Japan) Ayaka Takahashi	17	12
Q4	(China) Ma Jin (China) Tang Yuanting	21	21

Final
1	(China) Wang Xiaoli (China) Yu Yang	21	18	23
Q4	(China) Ma Jin (China) Tang Yuanting	17	21	21

== Mixed doubles ==
=== Seeds ===
1. (China) Zhang Nan / Zhao Yunlei (final)
2. (Indonesia) Tantowi Ahmad / Lilyana Natsir (champion)
3. (China) Xu Chen / Ma Jin (semifinals)
4. (Denmark) Joachim Fischer Nielsen / Christinna Pedersen (second round)
5. (England) Chris Adcock / Gabrielle Adcock (quarterfinals)
6. (Indonesia) Markis Kido / Pia Zebadiah Bernadeth (second round)
7. (Thailand) Sudket Prapakamol / Saralee Thoungthongkam (second round)
8. (South Korea) Ko Sung-hyun / Kim Ha-na (semifinals)

=== Top half ===
First round
1	(China) Zhang N (China) Zhao YL	21	21
(Japan) H Hashimoto (Japan) M Maeda	14	12
(South Korea) Shin B-c (South Korea) Eom H-w	21	21
(Scotland) R Blair (Scotland) I Bankier	19	12
5	(England) C Adcock (England) G Adcock	21	17	21
(Indonesia) I Fadhilah (Indonesia) W Anggraini	9	21	14
(Germany) P Käsbauer (Germany) I Herttrich	21	15	21
(Denmark) A Skårup Rasmussen (Denmark) L Grebak	11	21	10
3	(China) Xu C (China) Ma J	21	21
(Denmark) A Kristiansen (Denmark) J Houmann	11	19
Q3	(China) Lu K (China) Huang YQ	21	21
(Indonesia) R Widianto (Indonesia) P R Dili	14	14
7	(Thailand) S Prapakamol (Thailand) S Thoungthongkam	21	21
Q1	(England) M Nottingham (England) L Smith	15	16
(Japan) K Hayakawa (Japan) M Matsutomo	21	21
(England) C Langridge (England) H Olver	12	11

Second round
1	(China) Zhang N (China) Zhao YL	21	21
(South Korea) Shin B-c (South Korea) Eom H-w	8	7
5	(England) C Adcock (England) G Adcock	21	21
(Germany) P Käsbauer (Germany) I Herttrich	13	15
3	(China) Xu C (China) Ma J	22	21
Q3	(China) Lu K (China) Huang YQ	20	15
7	(Thailand) S Prapakamol (Thailand) S Thoungthongkam	19	19
(Japan) K Hayakawa (Japan) M Matsutomo	21	21

Quarter-finals
1	(China) Zhang N (China) Zhao YL	21	21
5	(England) C Adcock (England) G Adcock	10	13
3	(China) Xu C (China) Ma J	21	21
(Japan) K Hayakawa (Japan) M Matsutomo	11	16

Semi-finals
1	(China) Zhang N (China) Zhao YL	21	9
3	(China) Xu C (China) Ma J	11	4r

=== Bottom half ===
First round
(Thailand) M Jongjit (Thailand) S Taerattanachai	21	21
(Hong Kong) Chan Y L (Hong Kong) Tse Y S	14	18
(Russia) V Durkin (Russia) N Vislova	28	21	16
8	(South Korea) Ko S-h (South Korea) Kim H-n	26	23	21
(United States) P Chew (United States) J Subandhi	12	14
Q2	(Denmark) M Pieler Kolding (Denmark) K Rytter Juhl	21	21
PFQ	(India) T Kona (India) A Ponnappa	13	16
4	(Denmark) J Fischer Nielsen (Denmark) C Pedersen	21	21
(Hong Kong) Lee C H (Hong Kong) Chau H W	16	21
(Singapore) D B Chrisnanta (Singapore) Y Y V Neo	21	23
(Netherlands) J Arends (Netherlands) S Piek	19	24
6	(Indonesia) M Kido (Indonesia) P Z Bernadeth	21	26
(China) Liu C (China) Bao YX	18	16
Q4	(China) Chai B (China) Tang JH	21	21
(Malaysia) Chan P S (Malaysia) Lai P J	12	5
2	(Indonesia) T Ahmad (Indonesia) L Natsir	21	21

Second round
(Thailand) M Jongjit (Thailand) S Taerattanachai	16	15
8	(South Korea) Ko S-h (South Korea) Kim H-n	21	21
Q2	(Denmark) M Pieler Kolding (Denmark) K Rytter Juhl	21	24
4	(Denmark) J Fischer Nielsen (Denmark) C Pedersen	17	22
(Singapore) D B Chrisnanta (Singapore) Y Y V Neo	19	21	21
6	(Indonesia) M Kido (Indonesia) P Z Bernadeth	21	10	18
Q4	(China) Chai B (China) Tang JH	19	9
2	(Indonesia) T Ahmad (Indonesia) L Natsir	21	21

Quarter-finals
8	(South Korea) Ko S-h (South Korea) Kim H-n	21	19	21
Q2	(Denmark) M Pieler Kolding (Denmark) K Rytter Juhl	15	21	13
(Singapore) D B Chrisnanta (Singapore) Y Y V Neo	12	21	12
2	(Indonesia) T Ahmad (Indonesia) L Natsir	21	17	21

Semi-finals
8	(South Korea) Ko S-h (South Korea) Kim H-n	13	11
2	(Indonesia) T Ahmad (Indonesia) L Natsir	21	21

=== Finals ===
Semi-finals
1	(China) Zhang Nan (China) Zhao Yunlei	21	9
3	(China) Xu Chen (China) Ma Jin	11	4r
8	(South Korea) Ko Sung-hyun (South Korea) Kim Ha-na	13	11
2	(Indonesia) Tontowi Ahmad (Indonesia) Lilyana Natsir	21	21

Final
1	(China) Zhang Nan (China) Zhao Yunlei	13	17
2	(Indonesia) Tontowi Ahmad (Indonesia) Lilyana Natsir	21	21

Preceded by 2014 Malaysia Super Series Premier	BWF Super Series; 2014 season	Succeeded by 2014 India Super Series
