= 2013 China Open Super Series Premier =

2013 China Open
Tournament details
- Dates: 12–17 November 2013
- Total prize money: US$450,000
- Venue: Yuan Shen Gymnasion
- Location: Shanghai

The 2013 China Open is a top level badminton competition which took place on November 12–17, 2013 in Shanghai, China. It was the eleventh BWF Super Series competition on the 2013 BWF Super Series schedule. The total purse for the event is $450,000. A qualification round was held for three of the five disciplines.

== Men's singles ==
=== Seeds ===
1. (Malaysia) Lee Chong Wei
2. (China) Chen Long
3. (China) Du Pengyu
4. (Japan) Kenichi Tago
5. (Indonesia) Tommy Sugiarto
6. (Vietnam) Nguyễn Tiến Minh
7. (Denmark) Jan Ø. Jørgensen
8. (Thailand) Boonsak Ponsana

=== Top half ===
First Round
PFQ	(China) Gao H	21	21
(Chinese Taipei) Chou T-c	9	16
(Hong Kong) Hu Y	16	21	21
(China) Chen YK	21	19	13
8	(Thailand) B Ponsana	20	15
(India) P Kashyap	22	21
(Japan) K Momota	21	21
(Germany) M Zwiebler	18	16
3	(China) Du PY	21	21
(Denmark) H-K Vittinghus	15	5
(Japan) S Sasaki	21	21
Q2	(Russia) V Ivanov	8	17
5	(Indonesia) T Sugiarto	21	19	21
(Denmark) V Axelsen	19	21	10
(England) R Ouseph	17	7
(China) Wang ZM	21	21

Second Round
PFQ	(China) Gao H	17	21	21
(Hong Kong) Hu Y	21	19	23
(India) P Kashyap	11	12
(Japan) K Momota	21	21
3	(China) Du PY	15	21	21
(Japan) S Sasaki	21	11	8
5	(Indonesia) T Sugiarto	15	21	18
(China) Wang ZM	21	14	21

Quarterfinals
(Hong Kong) Hu Y	9	20
(Japan) K Momota	21	22
3	(China) Du PY	17	8
(China) Wang ZM	21	21

Semifinals
(Japan) K Momota	20	21	6
(China) Wang ZM	22	9	21

=== Bottom half ===
First Round
(Thailand) T Saensomboonsuk	12	10
(Malaysia) Chong W F	21	21
Q4	(China) Tian HW	19	21	21
6	(Vietnam) Nguyễn T M	21	16	14
(Chinese Taipei) Hsu J-h	15	17
(Indonesia) S D Kuncoro	21	21
Q3	(China) Xue S	22	17
3	(Japan) K Tago	24	21
(Japan) T Ueda	18	21	21
PFQ	(India) A Pawar	21	10	11
(Malaysia) Liew DR	21	21
7	(Denmark) J Ø Jørgensen	17	12
Q1	(South Korea) Shon W-h	21	21
(India) A Jayaram	18	19
(Netherlands) E Pang	13	10
2	(China) Chen L	21	21

Second Round
(Malaysia) Chong W F	14	21	21
Q4	(China) Tian HW	21	13	16
(Indonesia) S D Kuncoro	21	21
3	(Japan) K Tago	13	17
(Japan) T Ueda	21	17	22
(Malaysia) Liew DR	14	21	24
Q1	(South Korea) Shon W-h	19	16
2	(China) Chen L	21	21

Quarterfinals
(Malaysia) Chong W F	18	21	21
(Indonesia) S D Kuncoro	21	14	16
(Malaysia) Liew DR	10	1^{r}
2	(China) Chen L	21	14

Semifinals
(Malaysia) Chong W F	18	7
2	(China) Chen L	21	21

=== Finals ===
Semifinals
(Japan) Kento Momota	20	21	6
(China) Wang Zhengming	22	9	21
(Malaysia) Chong Wei Feng	18	7
2	(China) Chen Long	21	21

Final
(China) Wang Zhengming	21	8	14
2	(China) Chen Long	19	21	21

== Women's singles ==
=== Seeds ===
1. (China) Li Xuerui
2. (Thailand) Ratchanok Intanon
3. (China) Wang Yihan
4. (South Korea) Sung Ji-hyun
5. (Germany) Juliane Schenk
6. (India) Saina Nehwal
7. (China) Wang Shixian
8. (Chinese Taipei) Tai Tzu-ying

=== Top half ===
First Round
1	(China) Li XR	21	21
(Japan) K Imabeppu	12	13
Q3	(China) He BJ	19	23	21
(Singapore) Gu J	21	21	17
6	(India) S Nehwal	21	21
Q4	(Japan) N Okuhara	14	19
(Canada) N Grether	10	7
(China) Yu S	21	21
4	(South Korea) Sung J-h	14	21	21
(China) Suo D	21	17	16
(Thailand) B Ongbamrungphan	21	22
Q1	(China) Shen YY	18	20
5	(Germany) J Schenk	7	11
(China) Yao X	21	21
(China) Han L	21	21
(South Korea) Bae Y-j	12	15

Second Round
1	(China) Li XR	21	21
Q3	(China) He BJ	13	10
6	(India) S Nehwal	21	15	17
(China) Yu S	16	21	21
4	(South Korea) Sung J-h	21	21
(Thailand) B Ongbamrungphan	17	15
(China) Yao X	11	14
(China) Han L	21	21

Quarterfinals
1	(China) Li XR	21	21
(China) Yu S	16	18
4	(South Korea) Sung J-h	13	15
(China) Han L	21	21

Semifinals
1	(China) Li XR	21	21
(China) Han L	12	19

=== Bottom half ===
First Round
(China) Deng X	13	21	20
(Japan) S Takahashi	21	16	22
(Thailand) P Buranaprasertsuk	21	21
8	(Chinese Taipei) Tai T-y	18	10
(Japan) E Hirose	14	18
(India) A Pantawane	21	21
(Japan) M Mitani	14	18
3	(China) Wang YH	21	21
(Japan) Y Hashimoto	12	25
(Hong Kong) Yip P Y	21	27
(Indonesia) L Fanetri	14	13
7	(China) Wang SX	21	21
(Hong Kong) Chan T K	13	20
Q2	(China) Hui XR	21	22
PFQ	(China) Chen XJ	21	14	8
2	(Thailand) R Intanon	16	21	21

Second Round
(Japan) S Takahashi	13	15
(Thailand) P Buranaprasertsuk	21	21
(India) A Pantawane	13	10
3	(China) Wang YH	21	21
(Hong Kong) Yip P Y	11	16
7	(China) Wang SX	21	21
Q2	(China) Hui XR	16	10
2	(Thailand) R Intanon	21	21

Quarterfinals
(Thailand) P Buranaprasertsuk	21	18	21
3	(China) Wang YH	16	21	16
7	(China) Wang SX	24	21
2	(Thailand) R Intanon	22	10

Semifinals
(Thailand) P Buranaprasertsuk	13	5
7	(China) Wang SX	21	21

=== Finals ===
Semifinals
1	(China) Li Xuerui	21	21
(China) Han Li	12	19
(Thailand) Porntip Buranaprasertsuk	13	5
7	(China) Wang Shixian	21	21

Final
1	(China) Li Xuerui	16	21	21
7	(China) Wang Shixian	21	17	19

== Men's doubles ==
=== Seeds ===
1. (Indonesia) Mohammad Ahsan / Hendra Setiawan
2. (Denmark) Mathias Boe / Carsten Mogensen
3. (Japan) Hiroyuki Endo / Kenichi Hayakawa
4. (China) Liu Xiaolong / Qiu Zihan
5. (Malaysia) Koo Kien Keat / Tan Boon Heong
6. (South Korea) Kim Gi-jung / Kim Sa-rang
7. (Chinese Taipei) Lee Sheng-mu / Tsai Chia-hsin
8. (Indonesia) Angga Pratama / Rian Agung Saputro

=== Top half ===
First Round
1	(Indonesia) M Ahsan (Indonesia) H Setiawan	18	11
(South Korea) Lee Y-d (South Korea) Yoo Y-s	21	21
(Malaysia) Gan T C (Malaysia) Ong S H	21	17
(Hong Kong) Chan Y L (Hong Kong) Lee C H	23	21
6	(South Korea) Kim G-j (South Korea) Kim S-r	21	21
Q4	(China) Kang J (China) Liu C	14	13
(Chinese Taipei) Liang J-w (Chinese Taipei) Liao K-h	19	21
(Japan) H Hashimoto (Japan) N Hirata	21	21
3	(Japan) H Endo (Japan) K Hayakawa	21	21
(Malaysia) M Z A Latif (Malaysia) M F M Tazari	9	10
(Japan) T Kamura (Japan) K Sonoda	21	21
(Germany) P Käsbauer (Germany) J Zurwonne	14	12
8	(Indonesia) A Pratama (Indonesia) R A Saputro	11	19
(England) C Adcock (England) A Ellis	21	21
(Germany) M Fuchs (Germany) J Schöttler	21	21
Q2	(Germany) A Heinz (Germany) M Schwenger	15	15

Second Round
(South Korea) Lee Y-d (South Korea) Yoo Y-s	21	21
(Hong Kong) Chan Y L (Hong Kong) Lee C H	15	13
6	(South Korea) Kim G-j (South Korea) Kim S-r	21	21
(Japan) H Hashimoto (Japan) N Hirata	15	18
3	(Japan) H Endo (Japan) K Hayakawa	21	21
(Japan) T Kamura (Japan) K Sonoda	9	12
(England) C Adcock (England) A Ellis	21	16	21
(Germany) M Fuchs (Germany) J Schöttler	18	21	19

Quarterfinals
(South Korea) Lee Y-d (South Korea) Yoo Y-s	17	21	21
6	(South Korea) Kim G-j (South Korea) Kim S-r	21	14	11
3	(Japan) H Endo (Japan) K Hayakawa	21	21
(England) C Adcock (England) A Ellis	12	17

Semifinals
(South Korea) Lee Y-d (South Korea) Yoo Y-s	19	21	21
3	(Japan) H Endo (Japan) K Hayakawa	21	19	11

=== Bottom half ===
First Round
(China) Fu HF (China) Hong W	21	21
(Indonesia) B Angriawan (Indonesia) R K Suwardi	18	12
(China) Cai Y (China) Chai B	21	15	21
7	(Chinese Taipei) Lee S-m (Chinese Taipei) Tsai C-h	14	21	17
(Indonesia) M F Gideon (Indonesia) M Kido	21	12	21
(Chinese Taipei) Chen H-l (Chinese Taipei) Lu C-p	19	21	15
Q3	(China) Chen KF (China) Lu Kai	11	17
4	(China) Liu XL (China) Qiu ZH	21	21
Q1	(India) M Attri (India) B Sumeeth Reddy	14	6
(Russia) V Ivanov (Russia) I Sozonov	21	21
(Netherlands) R Bosch (Netherlands) K Ridder	16	18
5	(Malaysia) Koo K K (Malaysia) Tan B H	21	21
(Japan) H Saeki (Japan) R Taohata	11	12
(South Korea) Ko S-h (South Korea) Shin B-c	21	21
(Malaysia) Hoon T H (Malaysia) Tan W K	23	21
2	(Denmark) M Boe (Denmark) C Mogensen	21	15

Second Round
(China) Fu HF (China) Hong W	12	12
(China) Cai Y (China) Chai B	21	21
(Indonesia) M F Gideon (Indonesia) M Kido	18	17
4	(China) Liu XL (China) Qiu ZH	21	21
(Russia) V Ivanov (Russia) I Sozonov	21	21
5	(Malaysia) Koo K K (Malaysia) Tan B H	18	18
(South Korea) Ko S-h (South Korea) Shin B-c	21	17	18
(Malaysia) Hoon T H (Malaysia) Tan W K	17	21	21

Quarterfinals
(China) Cai Y (China) Chai B	14	21	21
4	(China) Liu XL (China) Qiu ZH	21	10	14
(Russia) V Ivanov (Russia) I Sozonov	14	21	15
(Malaysia) Hoon T H (Malaysia) Tan W K	21	18	21

Semifinals
(China) Cai Y (China) Chai B	21	17
(Malaysia) Hoon T H (Malaysia) Tan W K	23	21

=== Finals ===
Semifinals
(South Korea) Lee Yong-dae (South Korea) Yoo Yeon-seong	19	21	21
3	(Japan) Hiroyuki Endo (Japan) Kenichi Hayakawa	21	19	11
(China) Cai Yun (China) Chai Biao	21	17
(Malaysia) Hoon Thien How (Malaysia) Tan Wee Kiong	23	21

Final
(South Korea) Lee Yong-dae (South Korea) Yoo Yeon-seong	21	21
(Malaysia) Hoon Thien How (Malaysia) Tan Wee Kiong	13	12

== Women's doubles ==
=== Seeds ===
1. (China) Wang Xiaoli / Yu Yang
2. (Denmark) Christinna Pedersen / Kamilla Rytter Juhl
3. (China) Ma Jin / Tang Jinhua
4. (Japan) Misaki Matsutomo / Ayaka Takahashi
5. (China) Tian Qing / Zhao Yunlei
6. (South Korea) Jung Kyung-eun / Kim Ha-na
7. (Indonesia) Pia Zebadiah Bernadet / Rizki Amelia Pradipta
8. (China) Bao Yixin / Zhong Qianxin

=== Top half ===
First Round
(Hong Kong) Poon L Y (Hong Kong) Tse Y S	21	17	21
(Germany) J Goliszewski (Germany) B Michels	19	21	14
(Chinese Taipei) Cheng W-h (Chinese Taipei) Hsieh P-c	21	21
(Canada) N Grether (Canada) C Reid	17	11
(Japan) R Kakiiwa (Japan) M Maeda	21	14	21
(China) Ou DN (China) Tang YT	15	21	18
5	(China) Tian Q (China) Zhao YL	21	21
(Indonesia) A P L Variella (Indonesia) V Marissa	7	11
(Indonesia) N K Maheswari (Indonesia) G Polii	21	21
(United States) E Lee (United States) P L Obañana	17	14

Second Round
1	(China) Wang XL (China) Yu Y	21	21
(Hong Kong) Poon L Y (Hong Kong) Tse Y S	7	10
6	(South Korea) Jung K-e (South Korea) Kim H-n
(Chinese Taipei) Cheng W-h (Chinese Taipei) Hsieh P-c	w	/	o
4	(Japan) M Matsutomo (Japan) A Takahashi	21	21
(Japan) R Kakiiwa (Japan) M Maeda	17	13
5	(China) Tian Q (China) Zhao YL	21	21
(Indonesia) G Polii (Indonesia) N K Maheswari	14	13

Quarterfinals
1	(China) Wang XL (China) Yu Y	21	21
(Chinese Taipei) Cheng W-h (Chinese Taipei) Hsieh P-c	5	6
4	(Japan) M Matsutomo (Japan) A Takahashi	21	16	8
5	(China) Tian Q (China) Zhao YL	16	21	21

Semifinals
1	(China) Wang XL (China) Yu Y	w	/	o
5	(China) Tian Q (China) Zhao YL

=== Bottom half ===
First Round
(Thailand) D Aroonkesorn (Thailand) K Voravichitchaikul	21	21
(Denmark) L Damkjær Kruse (Denmark) M Rœpke	14	19
(South Korea) Go A-r (South Korea) Yoo H-w	19	19
7	(Indonesia) P Z Bernadet (Indonesia) R A Pradipta	21	21
(Thailand) S Amitrapai (Thailand) N Lam	21	21
(Germany) I Herttrich (Germany) C Nelte	19	16
(South Korea) Eom H-w (South Korea) Shin S-c
(Japan) M Aratama (Japan) M Taruno	w	/	o
(England) L Smith (England) G White	13	11
8	(China) Bao YX (China) Zhong QX	21	21
(South Korea) Chang Y-n (South Korea) Kim S-y	20	16
(China) Luo Y (China) Luo Y	22	21

Second Round
(Thailand) D Aroonkesorn (Thailand) K Voravichitchaikul	21	22
7	(Indonesia) P Z Bernadet (Indonesia) R A Pradipta	11	20
(Thailand) S Amitrapai (Thailand) N Lam	8	13
3	(China) Ma J (China) Tang JH	21	21
(Japan) M Aratama (Japan) M Taruno	13	20
8	(China) Bao YX (China) Zhong QX	21	22
(China) Luo Y (China) Luo Y	21	17	17
2	(Denmark) C Pedersen (Denmark) K Rytter Juhl	18	21	21

Quarterfinals
(Thailand) D Aroonkesorn (Thailand) K Voravichitchaikul	w	/	o
3	(China) Ma J (China) Tang JH
8	(China) Bao YX (China) Zhong QX	16	21	21
2	(Denmark) C Pedersen (Denmark) K Rytter Juhl	21	7	12

Semifinals
(Thailand) D Aroonkesorn (Thailand) K Voravichitchaikul	15	7
8	(China) Bao YX (China) Zhong QX	21	21

=== Finals ===
Semifinals
1	(China) Wang Xiaoli (China) Yu Yang	w	/	o
5	(China) Tian Qing (China) Zhao Yunlei
(Thailand) Duanganong Aroonkesorn (Thailand) Kunchala Voravichitchaikul	15	7
8	(China) Bao Yixin (China) Zhong Qianxin	21	21

Final
1	(China) Wang Xiaoli (China) Yu Yang	21	21
8	(China) Bao Yixin (China) Zhong Qianxin	13	7

== Mixed doubles ==
=== Seeds ===
1. (China) Zhang Nan / Zhao Yunlei
2. (Indonesia) Tontowi Ahmad / Liliyana Natsir
3. (China) Xu Chen / Ma Jin
4. (Denmark) Joachim Fischer Nielsen / Christinna Pedersen
5. (Malaysia) Chan Peng Soon / Goh Liu Ying
6. (Thailand) Sudket Prapakamol / Saralee Thungthongkam
7. (Indonesia) Markis Kido / Pia Zebadiah Bernadet
8. (Indonesia) Praveen Jordan / Vita Marissa

=== Top half ===
First Round
1	(China) Zhang N (China) Zhao YL	21	21
(Germany) P Käsbauer (Germany) I Herttrich	16	9
(South Korea) Ko S-h (South Korea) Kim H-n	7r
(England) A Ellis (England) L Smith	11
8	(Indonesia) P Jordan (Indonesia) V Marissa	23	16	19
(South Korea) Yoo Y-s (South Korea) Chang Y-n	21	21	21
(Hong Kong) Chan Y L (Hong Kong) Tse Y S	15	17
(England) C Adcock (England) G White	21	21
4	(Denmark) J Fischer Nielsen (Denmark) C Pedersen	21	21
(Germany) J Schöttler (Germany) J Goliszewski	7	8
(Germany) M Schwenger (Germany) C Nelte	18	21	17
(Indonesia) M F Gideon (Indonesia) R A Pradipta	21	15	21
5	(Malaysia) Chan P S (Malaysia) Goh L Y	16	21	21
(China) Lu K (China) Tang JH	21	18	19
(Germany) M Fuchs (Germany) B Michels	21	21
(Indonesia) E Subaktiar (Indonesia) G E Widjaja	16	13

Second Round
1	(China) Zhang N (China) Zhao YL	21	21
(England) A Ellis (England) L Smith	6	10
(South Korea) Yoo Y-s (South Korea) Chang Y-n	13	23	18
(England) C Adcock (England) G White	21	21	21
4	(Denmark) J Fischer Nielsen (Denmark) C Pedersen	21	21
(Indonesia) M F Gideon (Indonesia) R A Pradipta	6	6
5	(Malaysia) Chan P S (Malaysia) Goh L Y	22	30
(Germany) M Fuchs (Germany) B Michels	20	28

Quarterfinals
1	(China) Zhang N (China) Zhao YL	21	21
(England) C Adcock (England) G White	13	11
4	(Denmark) J Fischer Nielsen (Denmark) C Pedersen	21	21
5	(Malaysia) Chan P S (Malaysia) Goh L Y	19	19

Semifinals
1	(China) Zhang N (China) Zhao YL
4	(Denmark) J Fischer Nielsen (Denmark) C Pedersen	w	/	o

=== Bottom half ===
First Round
(South Korea) Kim G-j (South Korea) Kim S-y	21	11	21
(Indonesia) R Alexander (Indonesia) D Susanto	12	21	11
(Japan) K Hayakawa (Japan) M Matsutomo	17	23	14
6	(Thailand) S Prapakamol (Thailand) S Thungthongkam	21	21	21
(South Korea) Lee Y-d (South Korea) Shin S-c
(China) Chen ZF (China) Xia H	w	/	o
(Indonesia) R Widianto (Indonesia) P R Dili
3	(China) Xu C (China) Ma J	w	/	o
(South Korea) Shin B-c (South Korea) Eom H-w	5r
(Denmark) A Kristiansen (Denmark) J Houmann	11
(Hong Kong) Lee C H (Hong Kong) Chau H W	21	16	15
7	(Indonesia) M Kido (Indonesia) P Z Bernadet	17	21	21
(China) Kang J (China) Ou DN	16	18
(Japan) H Hashimoto (Japan) M Maeda	21	21
(China) Liu C (China) Bao YX	11	22	7
2	(Indonesia) T Ahmad (Indonesia) L Natsir	21	20	21

Second Round
(South Korea) Kim G-j (South Korea) Kim S-y	21	14	21
6	(Thailand) S Prapakamol (Thailand) S Thungthongkam	16	21	12
(China) Chen ZF (China) Xia H	14	12
3	(China) Xu C (China) Ma J	21	21
(Denmark) A Kristiansen (Denmark) J Houmann	10	21	21
7	(Indonesia) M Kido (Indonesia) P Z Bernadet	21	16	16
(Japan) H Hashimoto (Japan) M Maeda	11	13
2	(Indonesia) T Ahmad (Indonesia) L Natsir	21	21

Quarterfinals
(South Korea) Kim G-j (South Korea) Kim S-y	w	/	o
3	(China) Xu C (China) Ma J
(Denmark) A Kristiansen (Denmark) J Houmann	15	15
2	(Indonesia) T Ahmad (Indonesia) L Natsir	21	21

Semifinals
(South Korea) Kim G-j (South Korea) Kim S-y	9	11
2	(Indonesia) T Ahmad (Indonesia) L Natsir	21	21

=== Finals ===
Semifinals
1	(China) Zhang Nan (China) Zhao Yunlei
4	(Denmark) Joachim Fischer Nielsen (Denmark) Christinna Pedersen	w	/	o
(South Korea) Kim Gi-jung (South Korea) Kim So-young	9	11
2	(Indonesia) Tontowi Ahmad (Indonesia) Liliyana Natsir	21	21

Final
4	(Denmark) Joachim Fischer Nielsen (Denmark) Christinna Pedersen	10	21	17
2	(Indonesia) Tontowi Ahmad (Indonesia) Liliyana Natsir	21	5	21

Preceded by 2012 China Open Super Series Premier	China Super Series	Succeeded by 2014 China Open Super Series Premier
Preceded by 2013 French Super Series	2013 BWF Super Series	Succeeded by 2013 Hong Kong Super Series
