= 2014 China Open Super Series Premier =

2014 China Open Super Series
Tournament details
- Dates: 11–16 November 2014
- Level: Super Series Premier
- Total prize money: US$700,000
- Venue: Haixia Olympic Sport Center
- Location: Fuzhou, China

Champions
- Men's singles: (India) Srikanth Kidambi
- Women's singles: (India) Saina Nehwal
- Men's doubles: (South Korea) Lee Yong-dae (South Korea) Yoo Yeon-seong
- Women's doubles: (China) Wang Xiaoli (China) Yu Yang
- Mixed doubles: (China) Zhang Nan (China) Zhao Yunlei

The 2014 China Open will be the eleventh super series tournament of the 2014 BWF Super Series. The tournament will be contested in Fuzhou, China from November 11–16, 2014 with a total purse of $700,000. A qualification will occur to fill four places in all five disciplines of the main draws. For the first time in the history of this super series tournament, two non-Chinese players won men's and women's singles titles both from India.

== Players by nation ==
Nation	First round	Second round	Quarterfinals	Semifinals	Final
(China)	12	13	8	4	2
(Japan)	7	2	5	1	
(Thailand)	7	3	1		
(Chinese Taipei)	6	2		2	
(United States)	6	1			
(South Korea)	5	4	1	2	1
(Denmark)	4	4	1		
(India)	3	3	2	2	2
(Indonesia)	3	2	2		
(Singapore)	3	1			
(England)	2	2			
(Malaysia)	2	1			
(Russia)	2	1			
(Hong Kong)	2		1		
(Republic of Ireland)	2				
(Netherlands)	1	2			
(Vietnam)	1				
(France)	1				
(Spain)	1				
(Canada)	1				
(Poland)	1				
(Germany)		2		1	

== Representatives by nation ==
Top Nations
Rank	Nation	MS	WS	MD	WD	XD	Total
1	China	7	12	8	8	7	42
2	Japan	4	4	3	3	2	16
3	South Korea	2	2	2	5	3	14
4	Thailand	2	3	1	2	3	11
5	Chinese Taipei	2	3	4	1	0	10
6	Denmark	3	0	3	1	2	9
7	India	4	1	1	0	1.5	7.5
8	United States	0	3	1	1	2	7
8	Indonesia	1	1	1	1	3	7
10	England	1	0	2	0	1	4
10	Singapore	0	0	1	1	2	4
12	Malaysia	1	0	1	0	1.5	3.5
13	Germany	1	0	1	0	1	3
14	Hong Kong	2	0	0	0	1	3
14	Russia	0	1	1	0	1	3
14	Netherlands	0	0	0	1	2	3
17	Ireland	0	1	0	0	1	2
18	Vietnam	1	0	0	0	0	1
18	France	1	0	0	0	0	1
18	Spain	0	1	0	0	0	1
18	Poland	0	0	1	0	0	1
18	Canada	0	0	0	1	0	1

== Men's singles ==
=== Seeds ===
1. (China) Chen Long
2. (Denmark) Jan Ø. Jørgensen
3. (Japan) Kenichi Tago
4. (Indonesia) Tommy Sugiarto
5. (South Korea) Shon Wan-ho
6. (China) Wang Zhengming
7. (Hong Kong) Hu Yun
8. (China) Tian Houwei

=== Top half ===
First Round
1	(China) Chen L	21	21
(Vietnam) Nguyen T M	17	8
(England) R Ouseph	19	19
(Germany) M Zwiebler	21	21
8	(China) Tian HW	21	17	18
Q2	(China) Xue S	18	21	21
(India) K Parupalli	24	19	21
(Hong Kong) Wei N	22	21	15
3	(Japan) K Tago	14	17
Q4	(China) Gao H	21	21
(India) Srikanth K.	21	9	21
Q1	(India) G Datt	11	21	15
6	(China) Wang ZM	21	21
(Japan) T Ueda	18	17
(Japan) K Momota	21	21
Q3	(China) Guo K	13	19

Second Round
1	(China) Chen L	21	23	19
(Germany) M Zwiebler	13	25	21
Q2	(China) Xue S	21	11	13
(India) K Parupalli	11	21	21
Q4	(China) Gao H	17	21	14
(India) Srikanth K.	21	19	21
6	(China) Wang ZM	19	21	19
(Japan) K Momota	21	17	21

Quarterfinals
(Germany) M Zwiebler	18	21	21
(India) K Parupalli	21	18	13
(India) Srikanth K.	21	23
(Japan) K Momota	17	21

Semifinals
(Germany) M Zwiebler	11	7^{r}
(India) Srikanth K.	21	13

=== Bottom half ===
First Round
(India) Prannoy H.S.	10	21	18
(Denmark) V Axelsen	21	19	21
(Denmark) H-K Vittinghus	17	18
7	(Hong Kong) Hu Y	21	21
(Chinese Taipei) Chou T-c	21	9	21
(South Korea) Lee D-k	14	21	13
(France) B Leverdez	16	12
4	(Indonesia) T Sugiarto	21	21
(Japan) S Sasaki	21	21
(Thailand) T S'boonsuk	11	18
(Malaysia) Chong W F	21	22
5	(South Korea) Son W-h	14	20
(China) Lin D	21	23
(Chinese Taipei) Hsu J-h	15	21
(Thailand) B Ponsana	13	13
2	(Denmark) J Ø Jørgensen	21	21

Second Round
(Denmark) V Axelsen	19	14
7	(Hong Kong) Hu Y	21	21
(Chinese Taipei) Chou T-c	21	21
4	(Indonesia) T Sugiarto	13	14
(Japan) S Sasaki	24	23	21
(Malaysia) Chong W F	26	21	6
(China) Lin D	19	21	21
2	(Denmark) J Ø Jørgensen	21	18	15

Quarterfinals
7	(Hong Kong) Hu Y	18	21	17
(Chinese Taipei) Chou T-c	21	16	21
(Japan) S Sasaki	18	24
(China) Lin D	21	26

Semifinals
(Chinese Taipei) Chou T-c	17	17
(China) Lin D	21	21

=== Finals ===
Semifinals
(Germany) Marc Zwiebler	11	7^{r}
(India) Srikanth Kidambi	21	13
(Chinese Taipei) Chou Tien-chen	17	17
(China) Lin Dan	21	21

Final
(India) Srikanth Kidambi	21	21
(China) Lin Dan	19	17

== Women's singles ==
=== Seeds ===
1. (China) Li Xuerui
2. (China) Wang Shixian
3. (China) Wang Yihan
4. (South Korea) Sung Ji-hyun
5. (South Korea) Bae Yeon-ju
6. (India) Saina Nehwal
7. (Thailand) Ratchanok Intanon
8. (Chinese Taipei) Tai Tzu-ying

=== Top half ===
First Round
PFQ	(China) Suo D	21	21
PFQ	(Indonesia) M Wiranto	19	8
Q2	(China) Chen XX	21	15	16
(United States) I Wang	11	21	21
6	(India) S Nehwal	21	19	21
(Japan) S Takahashi	14	21	17
Q4	(China) Fang MY	16	13
Q1	(China) Qin JJ	21	21
4	(South Korea) Sung J-h	13	21	20
(China) Liu X	21	18	22
(Japan) E Hirose	22	21
Q3	(China) Shen YY	20	18
7	(Thailand) R Intanon	21	21
(China) Hui XR	19	12
(China) Han L	21	21
(United States) J Subandhi	13	9

Second Round
PFQ	(China) Suo D	21	21
(United States) I Wang	16	16
6	(India) S Nehwal	21	21
Q1	(China) Qin JJ	18	18
(China) Liu X	21	21
(Japan) E Hirose	14	14
7	(Thailand) R Intanon	21	21
(China) Han L	16	9

Quarterfinals
PFQ	(China) Suo D	13	21	5
6	(India) S Nehwal	21	17	21
(China) Liu X	21	21
7	(Thailand) R Intanon	15	18

Semifinals
6	(India) S Nehwal	21	21
(China) Liu X	17	17

=== Bottom half ===
First Round
(United States) Zhang BW	15	23	16
(China) Yao X	21	21	21
(Thailand) P Buranaprasertsuk	6	16
5	(South Korea) Bae Y-j	21	21
PFQ	(Chinese Taipei) Cheng C-y	21	13	21
(Russia) K Polikarpova	10	21	18
(Japan) M Mitani	10	15
3	(China) Wang YH	21	21
(Chinese Taipei) Pai H-m	19	11
(China) Sun Y	21	21
(Spain) C Marín	14	17
8	(Chinese Taipei) Tai T-y	21	21
PFQ	(Japan) A Yamaguchi	21	21
(Republic of Ireland) C Magee	18	10
(Thailand) B Ongbumrungpan	12	21	12
2	(China) Wang SX	21	14	21

Second Round
(China) Yao X	13	9
5	(South Korea) Bae Y-j	21	21
PFQ	(Chinese Taipei) Cheng C-y	15	10
3	(China) Wang YH	21	21
(China) Sun Y	21	11
8	(Chinese Taipei) Tai T-y	15	6^{r}
PFQ	(Japan) A Yamaguchi	21	21
2	(China) Wang SX	14	10

Quarterfinals
5	(South Korea) Bae Y-j	18	21	21
3	(China) Wang YH	21	19	19
(China) Sun Y	18	14
PFQ	(Japan) A Yamaguchi	21	21

Semifinals
5	(South Korea) Bae Y-j	10	23
PFQ	(Japan) A Yamaguchi	21	25

=== Finals ===
Semifinals
6	(India) Saina Nehwal	21	21
(China) Liu Xin	17	17
5	(South Korea) Bae Yeon-ju	10	23
PFQ	(Japan) Akane Yamaguchi	21	25

Final
6	(India) Saina Nehwal	21	22
PFQ	(Japan) Akane Yamaguchi	12	20

== Men's doubles ==
=== Seeds ===
1. (South Korea) Lee Yong-dae / Yoo Yeon-seong
2. (Indonesia) Mohammad Ahsan / Hendra Setiawan
3. (Denmark) Mathias Boe / Carsten Mogensen
4. (Japan) Hiroyuki Endo / Kenichi Hayakawa
5. (South Korea) Ko Sung-hyun / Shin Baek-cheol
6. (Chinese Taipei) Lee Sheng-mu / Tsai Chia-hsin
7. (China) Liu Xiaolong / Qiu Zihan
8. (China) Chai Biao / Hong Wei

=== Top half ===
First Round
1	(South Korea) Lee Y-d (South Korea) Yoo Y-s	21	21
(China) Wang YL (China) Zhang W	19	14
(Singapore) D B Chrisnanta (Singapore) C Triyachart	21	15	21
(Chinese Taipei) Huang P-j (Chinese Taipei) Lu C-y	16	21	15
7	(China) Liu XL (China) Qiu ZH	21	21
(India) M Attri (India) S Reddy B	12	15
(Chinese Taipei) Liang J-w (Chinese Taipei) Lu C-p	16	16
(England) A Ellis (England) P Mills	21	21
3	(Denmark) M Boe (Denmark) C Mogensen	20	20
(Germany) M Fuchs (Germany) J Schöttler	22	22
Q3	(Chinese Taipei) Chen H-l (Chinese Taipei) Wang C-l	22	21	11
(China) Cai Y (China) Lu K	24	13	21
5	(South Korea) Ko S-h (South Korea) Shin B-c	21	21
(Denmark) A Skårup Rasmussen (Denmark) K Astrup Sorensen	16	18
(Russia) V Ivanov (Russia) I Sozonov	13	21	16
(Denmark) M Conrad-Petersen (Denmark) M Pieler Kolding	21	19	21

Second Round
1	(South Korea) Lee Y-d (South Korea) Yoo Y-s	21	21
(Singapore) D B Chrisnanta (Singapore) C Triyachart	13	16
7	(China) Liu XL (China) Qiu ZH	21	21
(England) A Ellis (England) P Mills	10	10
(Germany) M Fuchs (Germany) J Schöttler	21	18	20
(China) Cai Y (China) Lu K	15	21	22
5	(South Korea) Ko S-h (South Korea) Shin B-c	22	19	21
(Denmark) M Conrad-Petersen (Denmark) M Pieler Kolding	20	21	19

Quarterfinals
1	(South Korea) Lee Y-d (South Korea) Yoo Y-s	25	21
7	(China) Liu XL (China) Qiu ZH	23	16
(China) Cai Y (China) Lu K	21	14	15
5	(South Korea) Ko S-h (South Korea) Shin B-c	18	21	21

Semifinals
1	(South Korea) Lee Y-d (South Korea) Yoo Y-s	21	11
5	(South Korea) Ko S-h (South Korea) Shin B-c	18	7^{r}

=== Bottom half ===
First Round
(England) M Ellis (England) C Langridge	w	/	o
Q2	(China) Li G (China) Liu C
(United States) P Chew (United States) S Pongnairat	10	10
6	(Chinese Taipei) Lee S-m (Chinese Taipei) Tsai C-h	21	21
(China) Fu HF (China) Zhang N	21	21
Q1	(China) Huang KX (China) Zheng SW	14	15
Q4	(Malaysia) Hoon T H (Malaysia) Tan B H	15	21	15
4	(Japan) H Endo (Japan) K Hayakawa	21	18	21
(Thailand) M Jongjit (Thailand) N Puangpuapech	11	21	23
(Japan) T Kamura (Japan) K Sonoda	21	19	21
(Thailand) W Ampunsuwan (Thailand) P Chalardchaleam	14	13
8	(China) Chai B (China) Hong W	21	21
(Poland) A Cwalina (Poland) P Wacha	12	21	16
(Japan) H Hashimoto (Japan) N Hirata	21	16	21
(China) Li JH (China) Liu YC	23	21
2	(Indonesia) M Ahsan (Indonesia) H Setiwan	21	8

Second Round
(England) M Ellis (England) C Langridge	22	9	15
6	(Chinese Taipei) Lee S-m (Chinese Taipei) Tsai C-h	20	21	21
(China) Fu HF (China) Zhang N	21	16	12
4	(Japan) H Endo (Japan) K Hayakawa	14	21	21
(Thailand) M Jongjit (Thailand) N Puangpuapech	17	19
8	(China) Chai B (China) Hong W	21	21
(Japan) H Hashimoto (Japan) N Hirata	21	21
(China) Li JH (China) Liu YC	14	19

Quarterfinals
6	(Chinese Taipei) Lee S-m (Chinese Taipei) Tsai C-h	21	14	21
4	(Japan) H Endo (Japan) K Hayakawa	19	21	19
8	(China) Chai B (China) Hong W	15	25	26
(Japan) H Hashimoto (Japan) N Hirata	21	23	24

Semifinals
6	(Chinese Taipei) Lee S-m (Chinese Taipei) Tsai C-h	12	21	11
8	(China) Chai B (China) Hong W	21	17	21

=== Finals ===
Semifinals
1	(South Korea) Lee Yong-dae (South Korea) Yoo Yeon-seong	21	11
5	(South Korea) Ko Sung-hyun (South Korea) Shin Baek-cheol	18	7^{r}
6	(Chinese Taipei) Lee Sheng-mu (Chinese Taipei) Tsai Chia-hsin	12	21	11
8	(China) Chai Biao (China) Hong Wei	21	17	21

Final
1	(South Korea) Lee Yong-dae (South Korea) Yoo Yeon-seong	21	21
8	(China) Chai Biao (China) Hong Wei	14	15

== Women's doubles ==
=== Seeds ===
1. (China) Bao Yixin / Tang Jinhua
2. (China) Tian Qing / Zhao Yunlei
3. (Japan) Misaki Matsutomo / Ayaka Takahashi
4. (Denmark) Christinna Pedersen / Kamilla Rytter Juhl
5. (China) Wang Xiaoli / Yu Yang
6. (Japan) Reika Kakiiwa / Miyuki Maeda
7. (China) Luo Ying / Luo Yu
8. (Indonesia) Nitya Krishinda Maheswari / Greysia Polii

=== Top half ===
First Round
(South Korea) Jang Y-n (South Korea) Yoo H-w	21	21
(Thailand) J Kittiharakul (Thailand) R Prajongjai	12	12
(China) Chen QC (China) Jia YF	15	17
(Netherlands) E Muskens (Netherlands) S Piek	21	21
(China) Ou DN (China) Yu XH	13	14
(Japan) S Matsuo (Japan) M Naito	21	21
(South Korea) Choi H-i (South Korea) Kim H-n	22	20	21
(China) Xia H (China) Zhong QX	20	22	10

Second Round
1	(China) Bao YX (China) Tang JH	10^{r}
(South Korea) Jang Y-n (South Korea) Yoo H-w	11
7	(China) Luo Y (China) Luo Y	21	21
(Netherlands) E Muskens (Netherlands) S Piek	17	15
4	(Denmark) C Pedersen (Denmark) K Rytter Juhl	11	21	21
(Japan) S Matsuo (Japan) M Naito	21	18	14
5	(China) Wang XL (China) Yu Y	21	21
(South Korea) Choi H-i (South Korea) Kim H-n	17	11

Quarterfinals
(South Korea) Jang Y-n (South Korea) Yoo H-w	17	12
7	(China) Luo Y (China) Luo Y	21	21
4	(Denmark) C Pedersen (Denmark) K Rytter Juhl	15	9
5	(China) Wang XL (China) Yu Y	21	21

Semifinals
7	(China) Luo Y (China) Luo Y	16	16
5	(China) Wang XL (China) Yu Y	21	21

=== Bottom half ===
First Round
(Canada) N Grether (Canada) C Reid	9	12
(South Korea) Go A-r (South Korea) Kim S-y	21	21
(Chinese Taipei) Cheng C-y (Chinese Taipei) Pai H-m	13	18
6	(Japan) R Kakiiwa (Japan) M Maeda	21	21
(Singapore) V Neo Y Y (Singapore) S M Sari	10	6
(South Korea) Eom H-w (South Korea) Jung K-e	21	21
(Thailand) P Supajirakul (Thailand) S Taerattanachai	17	21	21
(United States) E Lee (United States) P L Obanana	21	13	9
(South Korea) Lee S-h (South Korea) Shin S-c	14	21	16
(China) Tang YT (China) Huang YQ	21	17	21

Second Round
(South Korea) Go A-r (South Korea) Kim S-y	15	17
6	(Japan) R Kakiiwa (Japan) M Maeda	21	21
(South Korea) Eom H-w (South Korea) Jung K-e	21	18
3	(Japan) M Matsutomo (Japan) A Takahashi	23	21
(Thailand) P Supajirakul (Thailand) S Taerattanachai	8	18
8	(Indonesia) N K Maheswari (Indonesia) G Polii	21	21
(China) Tang YT (China) Huang YQ	16	19
2	(China) Tian Q (China) Zhao YL	21	21

Quarterfinals
6	(Japan) R Kakiiwa (Japan) M Maeda	21	15	15
3	(Japan) M Matsutomo (Japan) A Takahashi	19	21	21
8	(Indonesia) N K Maheswari (Indonesia) G Polii	14	17
2	(China) Tian Q (China) Zhao YL	21	21

Semifinals
3	(Japan) M Matsutomo (Japan) A Takahashi	15	16
2	(China) Tian Q (China) Zhao YL	21	21

=== Finals ===
Semifinals
7	(China) Luo Ying (China) Luo Yu	16	16
5	(China) Wang Xiaoli (China) Yu Yang	21	21
3	(Japan) Misaki Matsutomo (Japan) Ayaka Takahashi	15	16
2	(China) Tian Qing (China) Zhao Yunlei	21	21

Final
5	(China) Wang Xiaoli (China) Yu Yang	21	19	22
2	(China) Tian Qing (China) Zhao Yunlei	16	21	20

== Mixed doubles ==
=== Seeds ===
1. (China) Zhang Nan / Zhao Yunlei
2. (China) Xu Chen / Ma Jin
3. (Denmark) Joachim Fischer Nielsen / Christinna Pedersen
4. (Indonesia) Tontowi Ahmad / Lilyana Natsir
5. (England) Chris Adcock / Gabrielle Adcock
6. (South Korea) Ko Sung-hyun / Kim Ha-na
7. (Thailand) Sudket Prapakamol / Saralee Thoungthongkam
8. (China) Liu Cheng / Bao Yixin

=== Top half ===
First Round
1	(China) Zhang N (China) Zhao YL	21	21
(Netherlands) J Arends (Netherlands) S Piek	12	10
(China) Liu YC (China) Yu XH	22	22
(Singapore) D B Chrisnanta (Singapore) V Neo Y Y	20	20
8	(China) Liu C (China) Bao YX	21	21
Q2	(Malaysia) V I Mawan (India) P Sawant	10	11
Q4	(Singapore) C Triyachart (Singapore) S M Sari	12	11
(Indonesia) P Jordan (Indonesia) D Susanto	21	21
4	(Indonesia) T Ahmad (Indonesia) L Natsir	25	21
(Thailand) M Jongjit (Thailand) S Taerattanachai	23	9
(Indonesia) R Widianto (Indonesia) P R Dili	20	10
(Netherlands) J De Ruitter (Netherlands) S Barning	22	21
7	(Thailand) S Prapakamol (Thailand) S Thoungthongkam	21	21
(Japan) H Hashimoto (Japan) M Maeda	15	11
(China) Zheng SW (China) Chen QC	21	22
(Denmark) M Pieler Kolding (Denmark) K Rytter Juhl	15	20

Second Round
1	(China) Zhang N (China) Zhao YL	21	15	21
(China) Liu YC (China) Yu XH	9	21	17
8	(China) Liu C (China) Bao YX	21	21
(Indonesia) P Jordan (Indonesia) D Susanto	16	14
4	(Indonesia) T Ahmad (Indonesia) L Natsir	21	21
(Netherlands) J De Ruitter (Netherlands) S Barning	11	11
7	(Thailand) S Prapakamol (Thailand) S Thoungthongkam	9	18
(China) Zheng SW (China) Chen QC	21	21

Quarterfinals
1	(China) Zhang N (China) Zhao YL	21	21
(China) Liu C (China) Bao YX	13	13
4	(Indonesia) T Ahmad (Indonesia) L Natsir	18	15
(China) Zheng SW (China) Chen QC	21	21

Semifinals
1	(China) Zhang N (China) Zhao YL	20	21	21
(China) Zheng SW (China) Chen QC	22	15	13

=== Bottom half ===
First Round
(Germany) M Fuchs (Germany) B Michels	21	21
(United States) P Chew (United States) J Subandhi	9	11
(China) Lu K (China) Huang YQ	23	21
5	(England) C Adcock (England) G Adcock	21	8
(Japan) K Hayakawa (Japan) M Matsutomo	17	21	19
Q1	(China) Kang J (China) Luo Y	21	12	21
(South Korea) Shin B-c (South Korea) Jang Y-n	21	26	16
3	(Denmark) J Fischer Nielsen (Denmark) C Pedersen	17	28	21
Q3	(South Korea) Yoo Y-s (South Korea) Eom H-w	21	21
(Thailand) N Puangpuapech (Thailand) P Supajirakul	14	17
(United States) H Shu (United States) E Lee	9	17
6	(South Korea) Ko S-h (South Korea) Kim H-n	21	21
(Hong Kong) Lee C H (Hong Kong) Chau H W	17	21	13
(Russia) E Dremin (Russia) E Dimova	21	18	21
(Republic of Ireland) S Magee (Republic of Ireland) C Magee	11	13
2	(China) Xu C (China) Ma J	21	21

Second Round
(Germany) M Fuchs (Germany) B Michels	15	17
(China) Lu K (China) Huang YQ	21	21
Q1	(China) Kang J (China) Luo Y	21	21	21
3	(Denmark) J Fischer Nielsen (Denmark) C Pedersen	17	23	16
Q3	(South Korea) Yoo Y-s (South Korea) Eom H-w	21	21
6	(South Korea) Ko S-h (South Korea) Kim H-n	16	19
(Russia) E Dremin (Russia) E Dimova	9	15
2	(China) Xu C (China) Ma J	21	21

Quarterfinals
(China) Lu K (China) Huang YQ	21	21
Q1	(China) Kang J (China) Luo Y	10	13
Q3	(South Korea) Yoo Y-s (South Korea) Eom H-w	21	20	21
2	(China) Xu C (China) Ma J	19	22	15

Semifinals
(China) Lu K (China) Huang YQ	12	13
Q3	(South Korea) Yoo Y-s (South Korea) Eom H-w	21	21

=== Finals ===
Semifinals
1	(China) Zhang Nan (China) Zhao Yunlei	20	21	21
(China) Zheng Siwei (China) Chen Qingchen	22	15	13
(China) Lu Kai (China) Huang Yaqiong	12	13
Q3	(South Korea) Yoo Yeon-seong (South Korea) Eom Hye-won	21	21

Final
1	(China) Zhang Nan (China) Zhao Yunlei	23	21	21
Q3	(South Korea) Yoo Yeon-seong (South Korea) Eom Hye-won	25	14	18
