= 2012 Thomas Cup knockout stage =

This article lists the complete results of the knockout stage of the 2012 Thomas Cup in Wuhan, China. All times are China Standard Time (UTC+08:00).

== Bracket ==
Quarter-finals
23 May 2012
China	3
Malaysia	0
23 May 2012
Japan	3
Indonesia	2
23 May 2012
Russia	0
Denmark	3
23 May 2012
Germany	0
South Korea	3

Semi-finals
25 May 2012
China	3
Japan	0
25 May 2012
Denmark	1
South Korea	3

Final
27 May 2012
China	3
South Korea	0

== Quarterfinals ==
=== Japan vs. Indonesia ===
Japan
3
Wuhan Sports Gymnasium Center Court 2
23 May 2012
13:00

Indonesia
2

			1	2	3
1	(Japan) (Indonesia)	Sho Sasaki; Simon Santoso	20; 22	14; 21
2	(Japan) (Indonesia)	Noriyasu Hirata / Hirokatsu Hashimoto; Markis Kido / Hendra Setiawan	21; 16	21; 18
3	(Japan) (Indonesia)	Kenichi Tago; Taufik Hidayat	21; 12	21; 17
4	(Japan) (Indonesia)	Hiroyuki Endo / Kenichi Hayakawa; Mohammad Ahsan / Alvent Yulianto	17; 21	13; 21
5	(Japan) (Indonesia)	Takuma Ueda; Dionysius Hayom Rumbaka	21; 14	21; 19

=== Russia vs. Denmark ===
Russia
0
Wuhan Sports Gymnasium Center Court 4
23 May 2012
13:00

Denmark
3

			1	2	3
1	(Russia) (Denmark)	Vladimir Ivanov; Peter Gade	18; 21	13; 21
2	(Russia) (Denmark)	Ivan Sozonov; Jan Ø. Jørgensen	13; 21	11; 21
3	(Russia) (Denmark)	Evgenij Dremin / Sergey Lunev; Jonas Rasmussen / Mads Conrad-Petersen	12; 21	21; 17	18; 21
4	(Russia) (Denmark)	Denis Grachev; Viktor Axelsen				not played
5	(Russia) (Denmark)	Vladimir Ivanov / Ivan Sozonov; Mathias Boe / Carsten Mogensen				not played

=== China vs. Malaysia ===
China
3
Wuhan Sports Gymnasium Center Court 1
23 May 2012
19:00

Malaysia
0

			1	2	3
1	(China) (Malaysia)	Lin Dan; Daren Liew	17; 21	21; 9	21; 5
2	(China) (Malaysia)	Cai Yun / Fu Haifeng; Koo Kien Keat / Tan Boon Heong	21; 17	21; 18
3	(China) (Malaysia)	Chen Long; Muhammad Hafiz Hashim	21; 10	21; 11
4	(China) (Malaysia)	Shen Ye / Hong Wei; Lim Khim Wah / Goh V Shem				not played
5	(China) (Malaysia)	Chen Jin; Chong Wei Feng				not played

=== Germany vs. Korea ===
Germany
0
Wuhan Sports Gymnasium Center Court 3
23 May 2012
19:00

South Korea
3

			1	2	3
1	(Germany) (South Korea)	Marc Zwiebler; Lee Hyun-il	16; 21	21; 18	14; 21
2	(Germany) (South Korea)	Ingo Kindervater / Johannes Schöttler; Yoo Yeon-seong / Ko Sung-hyun	19; 21	11; 21
3	(Germany) (South Korea)	Dieter Domke; Son Wan-ho	20; 22	19; 21
4	(Germany) (South Korea)	Michael Fuchs / Oliver Roth; Lee Yong-dae / Kim Sa-rang				not played
5	(Germany) (South Korea)	Lukas Schmidt; Lee Dong-keun				not played

== Semifinals ==
=== Denmark vs South Korea ===
Denmark
1
Wuhan Sports Gymnasium Center Court 1
25 May 2012
13:00

South Korea
3

			1	2	3
1	(Denmark) (South Korea)	Peter Gade; Lee Hyun-il	21; 17	14; 21	10; 21
2	(Denmark) (South Korea)	Mathias Boe / Carsten Mogensen; Yoo Yeon-seong / Ko Sung-hyun	21; 10	21; 12
3	(Denmark) (South Korea)	Jan Ø. Jørgensen; Son Wan-ho	13; 21	21; 14	16; 21
4	(Denmark) (South Korea)	Jonas Rasmussen / Joachim Fischer Nielsen; Lee Yong-dae / Kim Sa-rang	21; 11	19; 21	15; 21
5	(Denmark) (South Korea)	Viktor Axelsen; Lee Dong-keun				not played

=== China vs Japan ===
China
3
Wuhan Sports Gymnasium Center Court 1
25 May 2012
19:00

Japan
0

			1	2	3
1	(China) (Japan)	Lin Dan; Sho Sasaki	23; 21	21; 17
2	(China) (Japan)	Cai Yun / Fu Haifeng; Shoji Sato / Naoki Kawamae	25; 23	21; 18
3	(China) (Japan)	Chen Long; Kenichi Tago	21; 13	21; 16
4	(China) (Japan)	Shen Ye / Hong Wei; Noriyasu Hirata / Hirokatsu Hashimoto				not played
5	(China) (Japan)	Chen Jin; Takuma Ueda				not played

== Final ==
China
3
Wuhan Sports Gymnasium Center Court 1
27 May 2012
14:00

South Korea
0

			1	2	3
1	(China) (South Korea)	Lin Dan; Lee Hyun-il	21; 14	21; 17
2	(China) (South Korea)	Cai Yun / Fu Haifeng; Lee Yong-dae / Kim Sa-rang	21; 16	25; 23
3	(China) (South Korea)	Chen Long; Son Wan-ho	21; 9	21; 13
4	(China) (South Korea)	Shen Ye / Hong Wei; Yoo Yeon-seong / Kim Ki-jung				not played
5	(China) (South Korea)	Chen Jin; Lee Dong-keun				not played

2012 Thomas Cup champion

China
Ninth title
