= 2007 BWF World Junior Championships – boys' singles =

2007 BWF World Junior Championships boys' singles
Tournament details
- Dates: 30 October 2007 – 4 November 2007
- Edition: 9th
- Level: International
- Venue: Waitakere Trusts Stadium
- Location: Waitakere City, New Zealand

The boys' singles event for the 2007 BWF World Junior Championships was held between 30 October and 4 November. Chen Long of China won the title.

== Seeds ==
1. (Malaysia) Mohd Arif Abdul Latif (quarter-final)
2. (China) Chen Long (champion)
3. (Malaysia) Lim Fang Yang (fourth round)
4. (Denmark) Dennis Prehn (second round)
5. (Scotland) Kieran Merrilees (third round)
6. (Japan) Kenichi Tago (final)
7. (Russia) Ivan Sozonov (fourth round)
8. (South Korea) Park Sung-Min (quarter-final)
9. (Denmark) Emil Holst (second round)
10. (Germany) Sebastian Rduch (third round)
11. (China) Zhang Qi (second round)
12. (Singapore) Derek Wong Zi Liang (fourth round)
13. (Malaysia) Teo Kok Siang (fourth round)
14. (Indonesia) Nandang Arif (quarter-final)
15. (Turkey) Huseyin Durakcan (third round)
16. (Thailand) Tanongsak Saensomboonsuk (third round)

== Draw ==
=== Finals ===
Quarterfinals
1	(Malaysia) Mohd Arif Abdul Latif	14	18
6	(Japan) Kenichi Tago	21	21
(Indonesia) Adi Pratama	18	16
(Chinese Taipei) Lu Chi-Yuan	21	21
(China) Gao Huan	21	21
14	(Indonesia) Nandang Arif	15	13
8	(South Korea) Park Sung-Min	8	17
2	(China) Chen Long	21	21

Semifinals
6	(Japan) Kenichi Tago	21	21
(Chinese Taipei) Lu Chi-Yuan	14	16
(China) Gao Huan	15^{r}
2	(China) Chen Long	17

Final
6	(Japan) Kenichi Tago	16	14
2	(China) Chen Long	21	21

=== Top half ===
==== Section 1 ====
First round
(Puerto Rico) H Rios	9	9
(Australia) B Ma	21	21
(Kyrgyzstan) D Babaev	WO
(Japan) K Sonoda
(Hong Kong) Wong WK	15	22	21
(Thailand) P Thongnuam	21	20	12

Second round
1	(Malaysia) A Abdul Latif	21	21
(Czech Republic) P Hosek	7	13
(Indonesia) A Arifin	WO
(Australia) B Ma
11	(China) Zhang Q	21	16	11
(South Korea) Kim S-R	15	21	21
(Japan) K Sonoda	19	18
(Hong Kong) Wong WK	21	21

Third round
1	(Malaysia) A Abdul Latif	21	21
(Australia) B Ma	11	12
(South Korea) Kim S-R	21	18	21
(Hong Kong) Wong WK	14	21	17

Fourth round
1	(Malaysia) A Abdul Latif	21	21
(South Korea) Kim S-R	17	18

===== Section 2 =====
First round
(Philippines) P Sunga	14	23
(Germany) J Zurwonne	21	25
(Singapore) A Chen	21	19	21
(India) R Gurusaidutt	18	21	17
(Philippines) A Babad
(Mongolia) K Bayarsaikhan	WO

Second round
6	(Japan) K Tago	21	21
(Bulgaria) I Krastev	8	6
(Singapore) E Sng	19	19
(Germany) J Zurwonne	21	21
15	(Turkey) H Durakcan	21	21
(Australia) K Yuen	19	14
(Singapore) A Chen	21	21
(Philippines) A Babad	15	11

Third round
6	(Japan) K Tago	21	21
(Germany) J Zurwonne	0	10
15	(Turkey) H Durakcan	10	3
(Singapore) A Chen	21	21

Fourth round
6	(Japan) K Tago	21	21
(Singapore) A Chen	13	12

===== Section 3 =====
First round
(Germany) A Heinz	21	12	17
(Hong Kong) Lam YY	9	21	21
(New Zealand) J Eunson
(Bulgaria) A Grigorov	WO
(Philippines) P Natvidad	9	11
(Malaysia) V Mawan	21	21

Second round
4	(Denmark) D Prehn	11	10
(Indonesia) A Pratama	21	21
(Australia) K Ng	21	21
(Hong Kong) Lam YY	17	12
10	(Germany) S Rduch
(Mongolia) U Enkhbat	WO
(New Zealand) J Eunson	11	8
(Malaysia) V Mawan	21	21

Third round
(Indonesia) A Pratama	21	21
(Australia) K Ng	9	12
10	(Germany) S Rduch	15	19
(Malaysia) V Mawan	21	21

Fourth round
(Indonesia) A Pratama	21	21
(Malaysia) V Mawan	19	11

===== Section 4 =====
First round
(South Africa) J Maliekal	8	14
(New Zealand) E Haggo	21	21
(Brazil) A Yuwan	18	17
(Bulgaria) V Paskov	21	21
(Vietnam) Bui BD	9	15
(Chinese Taipei) Lu C-Y	21	21

Second round
7	(Russia) I Sozonov	21	21
(Scotland) P Van Rietvelde	14	16
(England) J Bonsels	WO
(New Zealand) E Haggo
16	(Thailand) T Saensomboonsuk	21	21
(United States) R Hsia	8	9
(Bulgaria) V Paskov	12	14
(Chinese Taipei) Lu C-Y	21	21

Third round
7	(Russia) I Sozonov	21	21
(New Zealand) E Haggo	8	11
16	(Thailand) T Saensomboonsuk	21	14	17
(Chinese Taipei) Lu C-Y	9	21	21

Fourth round
7	(Russia) I Sozonov	9	19
(Chinese Taipei) Lu C-Y	21	21

=== Bottom half ===
==== Section 5 ====
First round
(South Africa) R Louw
(Japan) R Takeshita	WO
(Singapore) Ng ZR
(Mongolia) B Batbayar	WO
(India) S Verma	21	21
(Russia) G Kosenko	17	11
(Netherlands) J Hilbink	21	21
(Czech Republic) M Teller	15	15

Second round
(South Africa) R Louw	13	15
(Singapore) Ng ZR	21	21
(China) Gao H	21	21
9	(Denmark) E Holst	18	13
(India) S Verma	19	21	21
(Netherlands) J Hilbink	21	9	12
(India) A Nandaluri	13	18
5	(Scotland) K Merrilees	21	21

Third round
(Singapore) Ng ZR	19	10
(China) Gao H	21	21
(India) S Verma	19	24	21
5	(Scotland) K Merrilees	21	22	16

Fourth round
(China) Gao H	21	21
(India) S Verma	10	17

===== Section 6 =====
First round
(Puerto Rico) S Soto	7	6
(India) A Elango	21	21
(Kyrgyzstan) A Kubakaev	WO
(England) A Cheung
(Bulgaria) P Boichinov	21	21
(Puerto Rico) S Francis	9	13

Second round
(India) A Elango	22	21
(England) A Cheung	20	16
(Thailand) P Poodchalat	12	11
14	(Indonesia) N Arif	21	21
(Bulgaria) P Boichinov	21	21
(New Zealand) K Dennerley-Minturn	14	12
(Germany) P Welker	15	14
3	(Malaysia) Lim FY	21	21

Third round
(India) A Elango	10	21	19
14	(Indonesia) N Arif	21	19	21
(Bulgaria) P Boichinov	18	15
3	(Malaysia) Lim FY	21	21

Fourth round
14	(Indonesia) N Arif	16	21	21
3	(Malaysia) Lim FY	21	18	18

===== Section 7 =====
First round
(Japan) S Wada	20	16
(Chinese Taipei) Hsu J-H	22	21
(Vietnam) Nguyen NT
(Mongolia) T Erdenee	WO
(Vietnam) Bui QT	14	8
(Thailand) B Issara	21	21

Second round
(Chinese Taipei) Hsu J-H	21	21
(Vietnam) Nguyen NT	9	12
(Indonesia) S Setia Putra	WO
13	(Malaysia) Teo KS
(Thailand) B Issara	21	21
(United States) B Lum	8	15
(Vietnam) Dao MT	12	8
8	(South Korea) Park S-M	21	21

Third round
(Chinese Taipei) Hsu J-H	17	21	15
13	(Malaysia) Teo KS	21	19	21
(Thailand) B Issara	19	7
8	(South Korea) Park S-M	21	21

Fourth round
13	(Malaysia) Teo KS	19	13
8	(South Korea) Park S-M	21	21

===== Section 8 =====
First round
(New Zealand) L Charlesworth	21	21
(Philippines) J Arollado	5	9
(South Korea) Kang J-W	21	21
(Turkey) K Akcebe	15	14
(Sweden) H Fahlstrom	16	8
(China) Wang ZM	21	21

Second round
(New Zealand) L Charlesworth	19	6
(South Korea) Kang J-W	21	21
(Australia) J Cracknell	6	8
12	(Singapore) D Wong	21	21
(China) Wang ZM	21	21
(Hong Kong) Yau TT	7	11
(South Korea) Choi Y-W	19	21	11
2	(China) Chen L	21	15	21

Third round
(South Korea) Kang J-W	15	19
12	(Singapore) D Wong	21	21
(China) Wang ZM	13	13
2	(China) Chen L	21	21

Fourth round
12	(Singapore) D Wong	15	14
2	(China) Chen L	21	21
