= 2012 China Open Super Series Premier =

Tournament details
- Dates: 13–18 November 2012
- Total prize money: US$400,000
- Location: Shanghai

The 2012 China Open Super Series is a top level badminton competition held from November 13, 2012, to November 18, 2012, in Shanghai, China.It is the eleventh BWF Super Series competition on the 2012 BWF Super Series schedule. The total purse for the event was $400,000.

== Men's singles ==
=== Seeds ===
1. (China) Chen Long
2. (China) Chen Jin
3. (Indonesia) Simon Santoso (withdrew)
4. (China) Du Pengyu
5. (Japan) Kenichi Tago
6. (Japan) Sho Sasaki
7. (Vietnam) Nguyen Tien Minh
8. (Denmark) Jan Ø. Jørgensen

=== Top half ===
First Round
1	(China) Chen Long	21	21
Q4	(China) Qiao B	16	11
PFQ	(Russia) I Sozonov	13	8
PFQ	(China) Chen YK	21	21
5	(Japan) K Tago	23	21
(Germany) M Zwiebler	21	16
(Hong Kong) Wong W K	13	18
(Thailand) B Ponsana	21	21
PFQ	(United States) S Pongnairat	16	10
Q3	(China) Tian HW	21	21
(Japan) T Ueda	11	21	21
PFQ	(India) R.M.V. Gurusai D	21	13	11
6	(Japan) S Sasaki	13	16
(Malaysia) Chong W F	21	21
(Chinese Taipei) Hsu J-h	4	21	17
(Denmark) H-K Vittinghus	21	14	21

Second Round
1	(China) Chen L	21	21
PFQ	(China) Chen YK	19	10
5	(Japan) K Tago	21	21
(Thailand) B Ponsana	18	10
Q3	(China) Tian HW	16	18
(Japan) T Ueda	21	21
(Malaysia) Chong W F	21	21
(Denmark) H-K Vittinghus	13	19

Quarterfinals
1	(China) Chen L	21	21
5	(Japan) K Tago	13	12
(Japan) T Ueda	16	13
(Malaysia) Chong W F	21	21

Semifinals
1	(China) Chen L	21	21
(Malaysia) Chong W F	6	7

=== Bottom half ===
First Round
(Sweden) H Hurskainen	15	15
(India) K Parupalli	21	21
(England) R Ouseph	19	10
7	(Vietnam) Nguyen T M	21	21
(China) Wang ZM	21	17	21
(Russia) V Ivanov	14	21	9
(Indonesia) S D Kuncoro	11	21	21
4	(China) Du PY	21	17	19
(Malaysia) D Liew	21	16	21
(India) A Jayaram	18	21	14
Q1	(China) Gao H	21	21
8	(Denmark) J Ø. Jørgensen	15	11
Q2	(Japan) K Momota	17	21	18
(Hong Kong) Hu Y	21	18	21
(Indonesia) T Sugiarto	21	18	18
2	(China) Chen J	17	21	21

Second Round
(India) P Kashyap	12	22	21
7	(Vietnam) Nguyen T M	21	20	14
(China) Wang ZM	21	14	21
(Indonesia) S D Kuncoro	12	21	15
(Malaysia) D Liew	13	18
Q1	(China) Gao H	21	21
(Hong Kong) Hu Y	10	17
2	(China) Chen J	21	21

Quarterfinals
(India) P Kashyap	17	7
(China) Wang ZM	21	21
Q1	(China) Gao H	21	19	11
2	(China) Chen J	12	21	21

Semifinals
(China) Wang ZM	w	/	o
2	(China) Chen J

=== Finals ===
Semifinals
1	(China) Chen Long	21	21
(Malaysia) Chong Wei Feng	6	7
(China) Wang Zhengming	w	/	o
2	(China) Chen Jin

Final
1	(China) Chen Long	21	21
(China) Wang Zhengming	19	18

== Women's singles ==
=== Seeds ===
1. (China) Wang Yihan
2. (China) Li Xuerui
3. (India) Saina Nehwal (withdrew due to knee injury)
4. (China) Wang Shixian
5. (Germany) Juliane Schenk
6. (Denmark) Tine Baun
7. (South Korea) Sung Ji-hyun
8. (China) Jiang Yanjiao

=== Top half ===
First Round
1	(China) Wang YH	21	21
(Indonesia) A Yuswandari	15	19
(India) P.V. Sindhu	20	21	19
(Japan) E Hirose	22	14	21
5	(Germany) J Schenk	21
(South Korea) Bae Y-j	10	^{r}
(Thailand) P Buranaprasertsuk	21	12	11
Q3	(China) Wang L	14	21	21
PFQ	(Japan) N Okuhara	16	21	15
(Thailand) R Inthanon	21	13	21
(China) Liu X	16	21	21
(Hong Kong) Chan T K	21	13	11
6	(Denmark) T Baun	21	21
(Russia) A Prokopenko	8	19
Q4	(Thailand) N Jindapon	15	21	18
(China) Chen XJ	21	13	21

Second Round
1	(China) Wang YH	21	21
(Japan) E Hirose	19	19
5	(Germany) J Schenk	21	21
Q2	(China) Wang L	18	18
(Thailand) R Inthanon	21	21
(China) Liu X	19	13
6	(Denmark) T Baun	22	21
(China) Chen XJ	20	19

Quarterfinals
1	(China) Wang YH	21	16	17
5	(Germany) J Schenk	19	21	21
(Thailand) R Inthanon	21	21
6	(Denmark) T Baun	13	19

Semifinals
5	(Germany) J Schenk	21	14	10
(Thailand) R Inthanon	18	21	21

=== Bottom half ===
First Round
(Japan) M Mitani	19	21	21
(Chinese Taipei) Pai H-m	21	13	16
(Thailand) S Taerattanachai	18	21	21
7	(South Korea) Sung J-h	21	18	17
Q2	(China) Deng X	21	21
(Netherlands) Yao J	19	12
(Singapore) Fu MT	16	14
4	(China) Wang SX	21	21
(Hong Kong) Yip P Y	17	20
(China) Han L	21	22
(Indonesia) H Desi	13	15
8	(China) Jiang YJ	21	21
(Singapore) Gu J	12	19
(Thailand) B Ongbumrungpan	21	21
Q1	(China) Suo D	13	11
2	(China) Li XR	21	21

Second Round
(Japan) M Mitani	21	21
(Thailand) S Taerattanachai	16	10
Q2	(China) Deng X	21	22
4	(China) Wang SX	13	20
(China) Han L	21	21
8	(China) Jiang YJ	17	13
(Thailand) B Ongbumrungpan	21	13	12
2	(China) Li XR	13	21	21

Quarterfinals
(Japan) M Mitani	19	22	22
Q2	(China) Deng X	21	20	20
(China) Han L	21	5	7
2	(China) Li XR	19	21	21

Semifinals
(Japan) M Mitani	8	21
2	(China) Li XR	21	23

=== Finals ===
Semifinals
5	(Germany) Juliane Schenk	21	10	14
(Thailand) Ratchanok Inthanon	18	21	21
(Japan) Minatsu Mitani	8	21
2	(China) Li Xuerui	21	23

Final
(Thailand) Ratchanok Inthanon	12	9
2	(China) Li Xuerui	21	21

== Men's doubles ==
=== Seeds ===
1. (Denmark) Mathias Boe / Carsten Mogensen
2. (China) Cai Yun / Fu Haifeng
3. (Malaysia) Koo Kien Keat / Tan Boon Heong
4. (Japan) Hiroyuki Endo / Kenichi Hayakawa
5. (South Korea) Kim Ki-jung / Kim Sa-rang
6. (Japan) Hirokatsu Hashimoto / Noriyasu Hirata
7. (China) Hong Wei / Shen Ye
8. (Thailand) Bodin Issara / Maneepong Jongjit

=== Top half ===
First Round
1	(Denmark) M Boe (Denmark) C Mogensen	21	21
(Russia) V Ivanov (Russia) I Sozonov	11	16
(India) K Tarun (India) A Vishnu	21	21
Q1	(Mongolia) E Enkhbold (Mongolia) Z Munkhbaatar	2	4
8	(Thailand) B Issara (Thailand) M Jongjit
(China) Chai B (China) Zhang N	w	/	o
(Indonesia) A Y Chandra (Indonesia) M Kido	21	13	21
Q3	(India) M Attri (India) S Reddy B.	17	21	11
3	(Malaysia) Koo K K (Malaysia) Tan B H	16	21	22
(Thailand) P Chalardchaleam (Thailand) N Puangpuapech	21	14	20
(China) Liu XL (China) Qiu ZH	27	21
(India) P J Chopra (India) A Dewalker	25	17
6	(Japan) H Hashimoto (Japan) N Hirata	22	16	16
Q2	(Chinese Taipei) Chen H-l (Chinese Taipei) Lu C-b	20	21	21
(Malaysia) Gan T C (Malaysia) Ong S H	16	21	21
PFQ	(China) Li G (China) Liu C	21	11	16

Second Round
1	(Denmark) M Boe (Denmark) C Mogensen	21	21
(India) T Kona (India) A Vishnu	10	8
(China) Chai B (China) Zhang N	21	21
(Indonesia) A Y Chandra (Indonesia) M Kido	19	18
3	(Malaysia) Koo K K (Malaysia) Tan B H	21	21
(China) Liu XL (China) Qiu ZH	8	19
Q2	(Chinese Taipei) Chen H-l (Chinese Taipei) Lu C-b	21	21
(Malaysia) Gan T C (Malaysia) Ong S H	4	14

Quarterfinals
1	(Denmark) M Boe (Denmark) C Mogensen	21	21
(China) Chai B (China) Zhang N	16	16
3	(Malaysia) Koo K K (Malaysia) Tan B H	21	21
Q2	(Chinese Taipei) Chen H-l (Chinese Taipei) Lu C-b	17	17

Semifinals
1	(Denmark) M Boe (Denmark) C Mogensen	21	21
3	(Malaysia) Koo K K (Malaysia) Tan B H	16	16

=== Bottom half ===
First Round
(South Korea) Shin B-c (South Korea) Yoo Y-s	21	21
PFQ	(Chinese Taipei) Liang J-w (Chinese Taipei) Liao K-h	13	11
(Chinese Taipei) Chen C-j (Chinese Taipei) Lin Y-j	14	11
7	(China) Hong W (China) Shen Y	21	21
(United States) P Chew (United States) S Pongnairat	7	6
(Malaysia) Hoon T H (Malaysia) Tan W K	21	21
(Thailand) S Anugritayawon (Thailand) S Prapakamol	15	6
4	(Japan) H Endo (Japan) K Hayakawa	21	21
(Denmark) C J Skovgård (Denmark) M Pieler Kolding	15	8
Q4	(South Korea) Ko S-h (South Korea) Lee Y-d	21	21
(Germany) I Kindervater (Germany) J Schöttler	17	15
5	(South Korea) Kim K-j (South Korea) Kim S-r	21	21
(Malaysia) Chan P S (Malaysia) Lim K W	21	21
PFQ	(France) B Careme (France) G Mittelheisser	11	14
(England) C Adcock (England) A Ellis	9	10
2	(China) Cai Y (China) Fu HF	21	21

Second Round
(South Korea) Shin B-c (South Korea) Yoo Y-s	21	21
7	(China) Hong W (China) Shen Y	15	16
(Malaysia) Hoon T H (Malaysia) Tan W K	21	19	17
4	(Japan) H Endo (Japan) K Hayakawa	18	21	21
Q4	(South Korea) Ko S-h (South Korea) Lee Y-d	21	21
5	(South Korea) Kim K-j (South Korea) Kim S-r	19	17
(Malaysia) Chan P S (Malaysia) Lim K W	21	10	13
2	(China) Cai Y (China) Fu HF	15	21	21

Quarterfinals
(South Korea) Shin B-c (South Korea) Yoo Y-s	14	16
4	(Japan) H Endo (Japan) K Hayakawa	21	21
Q4	(South Korea) Ko S-h (South Korea) Lee Y-d	21	21
2	(China) Fai Y (China) Fu HF	17	16

Semifinals
4	(Japan) H Endo (Japan) K Hayakawa	16	15
Q4	(South Korea) Ko S-h (South Korea) Lee Y-d	21	21

=== Finals ===
Semifinals
1	(Denmark) Mathias Boe (Denmark) Carsten Mogensen	21	21
3	(Malaysia) Koo Kien Keat (Malaysia) Tan Boon Heong	16	16
4	(Japan) Hiroyuki Endo (Japan) Kenichi Hayakawa	16	15
Q4	(South Korea) Ko Sung-hyun (South Korea) Lee Yong-dae	21	21

Final
1	(Denmark) Mathias Boe (Denmark) Carsten Mogensen	21	21
Q4	(South Korea) Ko Sung-hyun (South Korea) Lee Yong-dae	15	14

== Women's doubles ==
=== Seeds ===
1. (China) Tian Qing / Zhao Yunlei
2. (China) Wang Xiaoli / Yu Yang
3. (China) Bao Yixin / Zhong Qianxin
4. (Denmark) Christinna Pedersen / Kamilla Rytter Juhl
5. (Japan) Shizuka Matsuo / Mami Naito
6. (Japan) Miyuki Maeda / Satoko Suetsuna
7. (Japan) Misaki Matsutomo / Ayaka Takahashi
8. (South Korea) Eom Hye-won / Jang Ye-na

=== Top half ===
First Round
1	(China) Tian Q (China) Zhao YL
Bye; Bye
(Russia) A Prokopenko (Russia) N Vislova	23	16	14
(Indonesia) G R Imawan (Indonesia) T R Nuraidah	21	21	21
8	(South Korea) Eom H-w (South Korea) Jang Y-n
Bye; Bye
(Indonesia) A F Agustin (Indonesia) N K Maheswari
(Thailand) S Amitrapai (Thailand) S Taerattanachai	w	/	o
3	(China) Bao YX (China) Zhong QX
Bye; Bye
(France) A Fontaine (France) E Lefel	17	6
(Thailand) D Aroonkesorn (Thailand) K Voravichitchaikul	21	21
6	(Japan) M Maeda (Japan) S Suetsuna
Bye; Bye
(Singapore) S M Sari (Singapore) Yao L	16	21	21
(China) Cheng S (China) Luo Y	21	16	19

Second Round
1	(China) Tian Q (China) Zhao YL
(Indonesia) G R Imawan (Indonesia) T R Nuraidah	w	/	o
8	(South Korea) Eom H-w (South Korea) Jang Y-n	18	21	21
(Thailand) S Amitrapai (Thailand) S Taerattanachai	21	13	11
3	(China) Bao YX (China) Zhong QX
(Thailand) D Aroonkesorn (Thailand) K Voravichitchaikul	w	/	o
6	(Japan) M Maeda (Japan) S Suetsuna	21	19	21
(Singapore) S M Sari (Singapore) Yao L	10	21	11

Quarterfinals
(Indonesia) G R Imawan (Indonesia) T R Nuraidah	11	21	7
8	(South Korea) Eom H-w (South Korea) Jang Y-n	21	16	21
(Thailand) D Aroonkesorn (Thailand) K Voravichitchaikul	8	20
6	(Japan) M Maeda (Japan) S Suetsuna	21	22

Semifinals
8	(South Korea) Eom H-w (South Korea) Jang Y-n	17	21	13
6	(Japan) M Maeda (Japan) S Suetsuna	21	19	21

=== Bottom half ===
First Round
(South Korea) Choi H-i (South Korea) Kim S-y	15	21	16
(Thailand) N Lam (Thailand) S Thoungthongkam	21	19	21
(Russia) T Bibik (Russia) A Chervaikova	10	10
5	(Japan) S Matsuo (Japan) M Naito	21	21
(Hong Kong) Poon L Y (Hong Kong) Tse Y S	21	21
(Chinese Taipei) Pai H-m (Chinese Taipei) Wu T-j	16	16
Bye; Bye
4	(Denmark) C Pedersen (Denmark) K Rytter Juhl
(United States) E Lee (United States) P L Obanana	21	18	24
(India) A Balan (India) N. S Reddy	18	21	22
Bye; Bye
7	(Japan) M Matsutomo (Japan) A Takahashi
(China) Ma J (China) Tang JH	21	21
(Indonesia) S R Andini (Indonesia) D D Haris	8	17
Bye; Bye
2	(China) Wang XL (China) Yu Y

Second Round
(Thailand) N Lam (Thailand) S Thoungthongkam	10	21	21
5	(Japan) S Matsuo (Japan) M Naito	21	18	16
(Hong Kong) Poon L Y (Hong Kong) Tse Y S	21	18	16
4	(Denmark) C Pedersen (Denmark) K Rytter Juhl	18	21	21
(United States) E Lee (United States) P L Obanana	16	6
7	(Japan) M Matsutomo (Japan) A Takahashi	21	21
(China) Ma J (China) Tang JH	19	18
2	(China) Wang XL (China) Yu Y	21	21

Quarterfinals
(Thailand) N Lam (Thailand) S Thoungthongkam	17	21	21
4	(Denmark) C Pedersen (Denmark) K Rytter Juhl	21	13	13
7	(Japan) M Matsutomo (Japan) A Takahashi	21	9	16
2	(China) Wang XL (China) Yu Y	13	21	21

Semifinals
(Thailand) N Lam (Thailand) S Thoungthongkam	9	4
2	(China) Wang XL (China) Yu Y	21	21

=== Finals ===
Semifinals
8	(South Korea) Eom Hye-won (South Korea) Jang Ye-na	17	21	13
6	(Japan) Miyuki Maeda (Japan) Satoko Suetsuna	21	19	21
(Thailand) Narissapat Lam (Thailand) Saralee Thoungthongkam	9	4
2	(China) Wang Xiaoli (China) Yu Yang	21	21

Final
6	(Japan) Miyuki Maeda (Japan) Satoko Suetsuna	19	7^{r}
2	(China) Wang Xiaoli (China) Yu Yang	21	21

== Mixed doubles ==
=== Seeds ===
1. (China) Xu Chen / Ma Jin
2. (China) Zhang Nan / Zhao Yunlei
3. (Indonesia) Tantowi Ahmad / Lilyana Natsir
4. (Denmark) Joachim Fischer Nielsen / Christinna Pedersen
5. (Malaysia) Chan Peng Soon / Goh Liu Ying
6. (Thailand) Sudket Prapakamol / Saralee Thoungthongkam
7. (Indonesia) Fran Kurniawan / Shendy Puspa Irawati
8. (Japan) Shoji Sato / Shizuka Matsuo

=== Top half ===
First Round
1	(China) Xu C (China) Ma J	21	21
(India) A Dewalker (India) P Gadre	5	17
(United States) P Chew (United States) J Subandi	18	9
(Japan) N Hirata (Japan) M Maeda	21	21
PFQ	(France) G Mittelheiser (France) E Lefel	16	17
(South Korea) Shin B-c (South Korea) Eom H-w	21	21
(China) Liu C (China) Bao YX	19	21	21
(Japan) K Hayakawa (Japan) M Matsutomo	21	18	16
4	(Denmark) J Fischer Nielsen (Denmark) C Pedersen	21	21
(Singapore) D Bawa Chrisnanta (Singapore) Y Y V Neo	16	16
(France) B Careme (France) A Fontaine	18	22	19
PFQ	(China) Qiu ZH (China) Luo Y	21	20	21
7	(Indonesia) F Kurniawan (Indonesia) S P Irawati	21	15	13
(South Korea) Yoo Y-s (South Korea) Jang Y-n	15	21	21
(India) A Vishnu (India) A Balan	8	19
(Denmark) M Pieler Kolding (Denmark) K Rytter Juhl	21	21

Second Round
1	(China) Xu C (China) Ma J	21	21
(Japan) N Hirata (Japan) M Maeda	14	14
(South Korea) Shin B-c (South Korea) Eom H-w	21	21
(China) Liu C (China) Bao YX	13	12
4	(Denmark) J Fischer Nielsen (Denmark) C Pedersen	21	21
PFQ	(China) Qiu ZH (China) Luo Y	18	15
(South Korea) Yoo Y-s (South Korea) Jang Y-n	22	13	21
(Denmark) M Pieler Kolding (Denmark) K Rytter Juhl	20	21	12

Quarterfinals
1	(China) Xu C (China) Ma J	21	21
(China) Liu C (China) Bao YX	15	19
4	(Denmark) J Fischer Nielsen (Denmark) C Pedersen	21	21	18
(South Korea) Yoo Y-s (South Korea) Jang Y-n	23	13	21

Semifinals
1	(China) Xu C (China) Ma J	21	21
(South Korea) Yoo Y-s (South Korea) Jang Y-n	19	13

=== Bottom half ===
First Round
(France) R Labar (France) L Choinet	13	16
PFQ	(Russia) V Ivanov (Russia) A Chervaikova	21	21
PFQ	(China) Tao JM (China) Tang JH	16	27	21
6	(Thailand) S Prapakamol (Thailand) S Thoungthongkam	21	25	16
(Republic of Ireland) S Magee (Republic of Ireland) C Magee	21	21	9
PFQ	(South Korea) Kim K-j (South Korea) Kim S-y	23	17	21
(Thailand) S Anugritayawon (Thailand) K Voravichitchaikul	10	14
3	(Indonesia) T Ahmad (Indonesia) L Natsir	21	21
(Russia) V Durkin (Russia) N Vislova	19	21	13
(South Korea) Kim Sa-r (South Korea) Choi H-i	21	18	21
(England) C Adcock (Scotland) I Bankier	16	14
5	(Malaysia) Chan P S (Malaysia) Goh L Y	21	21
(Thailand) P Chalardchaleam (Thailand) S Amitrapai	15	16
(Indonesia) R Widianto (Indonesia) P R Dili	21	21
(India) P J Chopra (India) N. S Reddy
2	(China) Zhang N (China) Zhao YL	w	/	o

Second Round
PFQ	(Russia) V Ivanov (Russia) A Chervaikova	7	14
PFQ	(China) Tao JM (China) Tang JH	21	21
PFQ	(South Korea) Kim K-j (South Korea) Kim S-y	18	17
3	(Indonesia) T Ahmad (Indonesia) L Natsir	21	21
(South Korea) Kim S-r (South Korea) Choi H-i	21	15	14
5	(Malaysia) Chan P S (Malaysia) Goh L Y	19	21	21
(Indonesia) R Widianto (Indonesia) P R Dili	21	21
(India) P J Chopra (India) S Reddy N.	11	15

Quarterfinals
PFQ	(China) Tao JM (China) Tang JH	17	10
3	(Indonesia) T Ahmad (Indonesia) L Natsir	21	21
5	(Malaysia) Chan P S (Malaysia) Goh L Y	21	21
(Indonesia) R Widianto (Indonesia) P R Dili	16	18

Semifinals
3	(Indonesia) T Ahmad (Indonesia) L Natsir	19	14
5	(Malaysia) Chan P S (Malaysia) Goh L Y	21	21

=== Finals ===
Semifinals
1	(China) Xu Chen (China) Ma Jin	21	21
(South Korea) Yoo Yeon-seong (South Korea) Jang Ye-na	19	13
3	(Indonesia) Tantowi Ahmad (Indonesia) Lilyana Natsir	19	14
5	(Malaysia) Chan Peng Soon (Malaysia) Goh Liu Ying	21	21

Final
1	(China) Xu Chen (China) Ma Jin	21	21
5	(Malaysia) Chan Peng Soon (Malaysia) Goh Liu Ying	15	17

Preceded by 2011 China Open Super Series Premier	China Super Series	Succeeded by 2013 China Open Super Series Premier
Preceded by 2012 French Super Series	2012 BWF Super Series	Succeeded by 2012 Hong Kong Super Series
