= 2008 BWF World Junior Championships – boys' singles =

2008 BWF World Junior Championships boys' singles
Tournament details
- Dates: 29 October 2008 – 2 November 2008
- Edition: 10th
- Level: International
- Venue: Shree Shiv Chhatrapati Sports Complex
- Location: Pune, India

The boys' singles event for the 2008 BWF World Junior Championships was held between 29 October and 2 November. Wang Zhengming won the title, continuing Chinese dominance in the discipline.

== Seeds ==
1. CHN Gao Huan (final)
2. KOR Park Sung-min (quarter-final)
3. CHN Wang Zhengming (champion)
4. THA Tanongsak Saensomboonsuk (quarter-final)
5. KOR Lee Dong-keun (semi-final)
6. MAS Iskandar Zulkarnain Zainuddin (quarter-final)
7. DEN Emil Holst (fourth round)
8. IND Gurusai Dutt (semi-final)
9. FIN Kasper Lehikoinen (second round)
10. JPN Rei Sato (fourth round)
11. TPE Hsu Jen-hao (fourth round)
12. INA Adi Pratama (quarter-final)
13. DEN Steffen Rasmussen (third round)
14. POR Pedro Martins (fourth round)
15. MAS Syawal Ismail (fourth round)
16. HKG Wong Wing Ki (fourth round)

== Draw ==
=== Finals ===
Quarterfinals
1	CHN Gao Huan	21	21
5/8	MAS Iskandar Zainuddin	11	11
3/4	THA T Saensomboonsuk	21	21	21
5/8	KOR Lee Dong-keun	23	19	23
9/16	INA Adi Pratama	11	16
3/4	CHN Wang Zhengming	21	21
5/8	IND Gurusai Dutt	21	14	21
2	KOR Park Sung-min	16	21	19

Semifinals
1	CHN Gao Huan	15	21	21
5/8	KOR Lee Dong-keun	21	14	13
3/4	CHN Wang Zhengming	21	17	21
5/8	IND Gurusai Dutt	16	21	17

Final
1	CHN Gao Huan	13	16
3/4	CHN Wang Zhengming	21	21

=== Top half ===
==== Section 1 ====
First round
IND A Prakash	21	21
SIN Tang KS	11	15
MAS Goh SH	21	21
GER N Coldewe	13	10
CAN D Pastewka	21	14
TUR K Akcebe	23	21
GER J Geigenberger	17	17
KOR Choi S-i	21	21
SIN E Sng	6	11
INA A Trisnanto	21	21
TPE Lin S-k	21	21
IRI S Eivani	16	14

Second round
1	CHN Gao H	21	21
IND A Prakash	20	12
MAS Goh SH	21	21
TUR K Akcebe	10	17
9/16	MAS S Ismail	21	17	21
KOR Choi S-i	17	21	19
INA A Trisnanto	21	21
TPE Lin S-k	18	14

Third round
1	CHN Gao H	21	21
MAS Goh SH	19	5
9/16	MAS S Ismail	16	21	21
INA A Trisnanto	21	16	14

Fourth round
1	CHN Gao H	17	23	21
9/16	MAS S Ismail	21	21	14

==== Section 2 ====
First round
NEP P Rajendra	18	19
PAK A Zahid	21	21
CZE M Teller	21	21
SIN K Ho	15	18
RUS A Yartsev	17	11
INA E Sukamta	21	21
SCO A Gilmour	21	17	21
ITA P Musiari	18	21	15
TPE Yang C-h	21	21
CAN P Butler	8	10
RUS Y Egerev	21	21
MRI A Alleck	6	11

Second round
5/8	MAS I Zainuddin	21	21
PAK A Zahid	13	13
CZE M Teller	7	10
INA E Sukamta	21	21
9/16	TPE Hsu J-h	21	21
SCO A Gilmour	15	14
TPE Yang C-h	21	21
RUS Y Egerev	18	13

Third round
5/8	MAS I Zainuddin	24	21
INA E Sukamta	22	8
9/16	TPE Hsu J-h	21	21
TPE Yang C-h	17	16

Fourth round
5/8	MAS I Zainuddin	21	21
9/16	TPE Hsu J-h	11	15

==== Section 3 ====
First round
EGY A Abdelrahman	19	4
JAM G Henry	21	21
EGY M Safwat	10	8
SCO P van Rietvelde	21	21
PAK M Ali	21	10	15
RUS N Matazov	16	21	21
ENG R Morris	21	21
SRI S Gunawardena	13	16
BAN L Chand
SYR A Awad	WO
(Afghanistan) K Kabir	4	7
CHN Zhang S	21	21

Second round
3/4	THA T Saensomboonsuk	21	21
JAM G Henry	12	17
SCO P van Rietvelde	21	21
RUS N Matazov	14	9
9/16	JPN R Sato	21	21
ENG R Morris	14	8
BAN L Chand	10	13
CHN Zhang S	21	21

Third round
3/4	THA T Saensomboonsuk	21	21
SCO P van Rietvelde	11	13
9/16	JPN R Sato	21	18	21
CHN Zhang S	12	21	18

Fourth round
3/4	THA T Saensomboonsuk	21	13	21
9/16	JPN R Sato	17	21	14

==== Section 4 ====
First round
IRQ O Husamuldeen	12	15
EST I Seidelberg	21	21
FRA T Rouxel	19	21	19
THA B Isara	21	12	21
AFG G Abed	5	5
ENG M Middleton	21	21
SRI D Kariyawasam	21	23
NZL J Eunson	13	21
CAN T Chiu	10	17
GER A Heinz	21	21
HKG Ng KL	12	15
INA E Setiawan	21	21

Second round
5/8	KOR Lee D-k	21	21
EST I Seidelberg	13	12
THA B Isara	21	21
ENG M Middleton	15	9
9/16	DEN S Rasmussen	21	21
SRI D Kariyawasam	11	17
GER A Heinz	12	0^{r}
INA E Setiawan	21	5

Third round
5/8	KOR Lee D-k	21	21
THA B Isara	12	7
9/16	DEN S Rasmussen	16	11
INA E Setiawan	21	21

Fourth round
5/8	KOR Lee D-k	21	21
INA E Setiawan	12	16

=== Bottom half ===
==== Section 5 ====
First round
BUL B Andreev	21	17
SIN Ng ZR	23	21
IND P Patel	6	17
TPE Chou T-c	21	21
EST K Kaljurand	9	22	23
EGY A El Khateeb	21	20	25
NZL L Charlesworth	14	10
9/16	INA A Pratama	21	21
ITA G Greco	21	12	21
NEP T Sajan	16	21	11
IRQ M Neamah	21	13	14
MRI J Joson	17	21	21
ENG B Stawski	17	21	18
NZL M Fowke	21	5	21

Second round
SIN Ng ZR	10	17
TPE Chou T-c	21	21
EGY A Elkhateeb	14	10
9/16	INA A Pratama	21	21
ITA G Greco	21	21
MRI J Joson	8	9
NZL M Fowke	17	11
5/8	DEN E Holst	21	21

Third round
TPE Chou T-c	21	14	18
9/16	INA A Pratama	11	21	21
ITA G Greco	11	15
5/8	DEN E Holst	21	21

Fourth round
9/16	INA A Pratama	21	21
5/8	DEN E Holst	18	18

==== Section 6 ====
First round
AFG Y Masaud	13	9
RUS S Scherbin	21	21
CAN M Guiffre	17	7
JPN M Kido	21	21
SCO C Pollock	9	4
NZL E Haggo	21	21
CZE M Ludík	21	21
BAN M Sazzad	13	7
PAK A Khan	21	16	7
SRI C Fernando	16	21	21
SRI N Hettiarachchi	12	16
THA P Poodchalat	21	21

Second round
RUS S Scherbin	8	12
JPN M Kido	21	21
NZL E Haggo	16	12
9/16	POR P Martins	21	21
CZE M Ludík	21	21
SRI C Fernando	17	6
THA P Poodchalat	11	14
3/4	CHN Wang ZM	21	21

Third round
JPN M Kido	21	14	20
9/16	POR P Martins	15	21	22
CZE M Ludík	12	14
3/4	CHN Wang ZM	21	21

Fourth round
9/16	POR P Martins	19	13
3/4	CHN Wang ZM	21	21

==== Section 7 ====
First round
TUR R Öztürk	12	18
JPN S Wada	21	21
AFG R Shekib	14	12
PAK M I S Bhatti	21	21
MAS Kuan KC	21	21
IND P Kumar	15	16
HKG Lee CH	19	18
SCO M Campbell	21	21
TUR H Oruç	21	21
EGY M El Sayad	7	10
SYR M Al Jonid	WO
IRQ M Othman

Second round
JPN S Wada	21	21
PAK M I S Bhatti	9	8
MAS Kuan KC	21	21
9/16	FIN K Lehikoinen	15	9
SCO M Campbell	21	21
TUR H Oruç	17	15
IRQ M Othman	6	2
5/8	IND G Dutt	21	21

Third round
JPN S Wada	15	4
MAS Kuan KC	21	21
SCO M Campbell	6	13
5/8	IND G Dutt	21	21

Fourth round
MAS Kuan KC	21	19	12
5/8	IND G Dutt	19	21	21

==== Section 8 ====
First round
JPN H Takeuchi	21	21
TUR E Aslan	19	7
THA P Thongnuam	21	19	16
GER R Domke	16	21	21
CHN Gan ZL	21	21
ENG B Tier	11	6
EST K Taherand	22	18
FRA M Michel	24	21
IRI M Khanjani	19	21	22
JAM C Parsons	21	6	20
MRI J Perne	6	9
KOR Kang J-w	21	21

Second round
JPN H Takeuchi	13	16
GER R Domke	21	21
CHN Gan ZL	12	11
9/16	HKG Wong WK	21	21
FRA M Michel	21	19	21
IRI M Khanjani	9	21	8
KOR Kang J-w	9	17
2	KOR Park S-m	21	21

Third round
GER R Domke	14	14
9/16	HKG Wong WK	21	21
FRA M Michel	6	14
2	KOR Park S-m	21	21

Fourth round
9/16	HKG Wong WK	17	21	18
2	KOR Park S-m	21	16	21
