= Takuma Ueda =

Japanese badminton player (born 1989)

Personal information
- Born: 21 March 1989 (age 37) Kokubunji, Tokyo, Japan
- Height: 1.73 m (5 ft 8 in)
- Weight: 67 kg (148 lb)

Sport
- Country: Japan
- Sport: Badminton
- Handedness: Right
- Retired: 31 March 2019

Men's singles
- Highest ranking: 12 (4 July 2013)
- BWF profile
Medal record
Men's badminton
Representing Japan
Sudirman Cup
Silver medal – second place	2015 Dongguan	Mixed team
Thomas Cup
Gold medal – first place	2014 New Delhi	Men's team
Bronze medal – third place	2012 Wuhan	Men's team
Asia Team Championships
Silver medal – second place	2016 Hyderabad	Men's team
Summer Universiade
Bronze medal – third place	2011 Shenzhen	Men's singles

Takuma Ueda (上田 拓馬, Ueda Takuma; born 21 March 1989) is a male Japanese badminton player from the Unisys team. He was the victor of the final match against Malaysia over Liew Daren in the 2014 Thomas Cup, which saw Japan win the tournament for the first time and in their debut final. He competed at the 2014 Asian Games.

At the 2011 Summer Universiade in Shenzhen, Ueda won the bronze medal in men's singles.

== Achievements ==
=== Summer Universiade ===
Men's singles
Year	Venue	Opponent	Score	Result	Ref.
2011	Gymnasium of SZIIT; Shenzhen, China	(China) Wen Kai	17–21, 12–21	Bronze	

=== World University Championships ===
Men's doubles
Year	Venue	Partner	Opponent	Score	Result	Ref.
2008	University of Minho, Campus de Gualtar; Braga, Portugal	(Japan) Kazushi Yamada	(Indonesia) Mohammad Ahsan (Indonesia) Bona Septano	15–21, 13–21	Bronze	

=== BWF Grand Prix ===
The BWF Grand Prix has two level such as Grand Prix and Grand Prix Gold. It is a series of badminton tournaments, sanctioned by Badminton World Federation (BWF) since 2007.

Men's Singles
Year	Tournament	Opponent	Score	Result	Ref.
2010	Russian Open	(Russia) Stanislav Pukhov	21–17, 21–17	(gold) Winner	
2012	U.S. Open	(Russia) Vladimir Ivanov	20–22, 17–21	(silver) Runner-up	
2012	Vietnam Open	(Vietnam) Nguyen Tien Minh	14–21, 19–21	(silver) Runner-up	

BWF Grand Prix Gold tournament
BWF Grand Prix tournament

=== BWF International Challenge/Series ===
Men's doubles
Year	Tournament	Partner	Opponent	Score	Result	Ref.
2009	Vietnam International	(Japan) Takeshi Kamura	(Malaysia) Chow Pak Chuu (Malaysia) Hong Chieng Hun	21–14, 21–14	(gold) Winner	

BWF International Challenge tournament

== Performance timeline ==
Key

W	Won	F	Finalist	SF	Semi-finalist
QF	Quarter-finalist	#R	Rounds 4, 3, 2, 1	RR	Round-robin stage
Q#	Qualification round	A	Absent	w/d	Withdrew
G	Gold	S	Silver	B	Bronze
NH	Not held	N/A	Not applicable	DNQ	Did not qualify

=== National team ===
- Junior level

Team events	2006	Ref.
Asian Junior Championships	QF	

- Senior level

Team events	2011	2012	2013	2014	2015	2016	2017	2018	Ref.
Asia Team Championships	NH					S	NH	A	
Asian Games	NH			QF	NH			A	
Sudirman Cup	A	NH	QF	NH	S	NH	A	NH	
Thomas Cup	NH	B	NH	G	NH	QF	NH	A	

=== Individual competitions ===
Tournament	2011	2012	2013	2014	2015	2016	2017	2018	Best	Ref.
World Championships	A	NH	3R	1R	A	NH	1R	A	3R ('13)	
Asian Championships	2R	2R	2R	A		2R	2R	A	2R ('11, '12, '13, '16, '17)	

Tournament	WGP	Superseries / Grand Prix Gold and Grand Prix											WT	Best	Ref.
Tournament	2006	2007	2008	2009	2010	2011	2012	2013	2014	2015	2016	2017	2018	Best	Ref.
All England Open	A							2R	2R	2R	1R	Q2	A	2R ('13, '14, '15)	
China Open	A						QF	2R	1R	1R	QF	Q2	A	QF ('12, '16)	
Japan Open	2R	Q1	1R	1R	2R	2R	2R	1R	2R	1R	Q2	Q1	A	2R ('06, '10, '11, '12, '14)	
Indonesia Open	A							2R	1R	1R	Q1	Q2	A	2R ('13)	
Malaysia Open	A							1R	1R	1R	1R	1R	A	1R ('13, '14, '15, '16, '17)	
Denmark Open	A						1R	1R	1R	A		1R	A	1R ('12, '13, '14, '17)	
French Open	N/A	A					1R	1R	2R	1R	A	Q	A	2R ('14)	
Hong Kong Open	A					1R	2R	1R	QF	1R	1R	Q	A	QF ('14)	
Singapore Open	A							SF	1R	1R	1R	Q	A	SF ('13)	
Korea Open	A					Q	A	QF	2R	A	Q	Q	A	QF ('13)	
India Open	NH		A			QF	A	1R	QF	QF	1R	A		QF ('11, '14, '15)	
China Masters	A					1R	1R	1R	A					1R ('11, '12, '13)	
Indonesia Masters	NH				A	QF	A					NH	A	QF ('11)	
Malaysia Masters	NH			A		2R	QF	A		1R	1R	A		QF ('12)	
German Open	A				2R	2R	A	3R	3R	2R	1R	SF	A	SF ('17)	
Swiss Open	A						3R	QF	A	QF	1R	A	1R	QF ('13, '15)	
Chinese Taipei Open	A		3R	A					QF	1R	A			QF ('14)	
Thailand Open	A				NH	2R	1R	A	NH	A	2R	A		2R ('11, '16)	
Macau Open	A												Q2	Q2 ('18)	
Australian Open	N/A			A		QF	QF	A	2R	2R	1R	1R	2R	QF ('11, '12)	
Syed Modi International	NH			A	2R	A		NH	A		1R	A		2R ('10)	
U.S. Open	A					3R	F	QF	A	QF	A			F ('12)	
Canada Open	N/A				1R	QF	A			SF	A			SF ('15)	
New Zealand Open	A				NH	N/A	NH	A					1R	1R ('18)	
Bitburger Open	A									2R	A			2R ('15)	
Russian Open	A				W	A								W ('10)	
Korea Masters	NH	N/A			SF	A								SF ('10)	
Vietnam Open	A		2R	A			F	A						F ('12)	
Akita Masters	NH												3R	3R ('18)	
Tournament	2006	2007	2008	2009	2010	2011	2012	2013	2014	2015	2016	2017	2018	Best	Ref.
