= Lee Dong-keun (badminton) =

South Korean badminton player

Personal information
- Born: 20 November 1990 (age 35) Seoul, South Korea
- Height: 1.83 m (6 ft 0 in)

Sport
- Country: South Korea
- Sport: Badminton
- Handedness: Right

Men's singles
- Highest ranking: 16 (29 September 2016)
- BWF profile
Medal record
Men's badminton
Representing South Korea
Sudirman Cup
Silver medal – second place	2013 Kuala Lumpur	Mixed team
Bronze medal – third place	2015 Dongguan	Mixed team
Thomas Cup
Silver medal – second place	2012 Wuhan	Men's team
Bronze medal – third place	2016 Kunshan	Men's team
Asian Games
Gold medal – first place	2014 Incheon	Men's team
Asia Team Championships
Bronze medal – third place	2016 Hyderabad	Men's team
Bronze medal – third place	2018 Alor Setar	Men's team
World Junior Championships
Silver medal – second place	2008 Pune	Mixed team
Bronze medal – third place	2008 Pune	Boys' singles
Asian Junior Championships
Silver medal – second place	2008 Kuala Lumpur	Mixed team

- Lee Dong-keun
- Hangul: 이동근
- Hanja: 李東根
- RR: I Donggeun
- MR: I Tonggŭn

Lee Dong-keun (Korean: 이동근; Korean pronunciation: [i.doŋ.ɡɯn] or [i] [toŋ.ɡɯn]; born 20 November 1990) is a Korean badminton player specializing in men's singles. He won his first international senior title at the 2011 Vietnam International tournament. Lee participated at the 2012 World University Championships in Gwangju, South Korea, won a gold medal in the mixed team and a bronze in the singles events. He was also part of the South Korean winning team at the 2014 Asian Games. In 2016, Lee represented his country competing at the Summer Olympics in Rio de Janeiro, Brazil.

== Achievements ==
=== World University Championships ===
Men's singles
Year	Venue	Opponent	Score	Result
2012	Yeomju Gymnasium; Gwangju, South Korea	(Spain) Pablo Abián	16–21, 13–21	Bronze

=== BWF World Junior Championships ===
Boys' singles
Year	Venue	Opponent	Score	Result
2008	Shree Shiv Chhatrapati Badminton Hall; Pune, India	(China) Gao Huan	21–15, 14–21, 13–21	Bronze

=== BWF World Tour ===
The BWF World Tour, which was announced on 19 March 2017 and implemented in 2018, is a series of elite badminton tournaments sanctioned by the Badminton World Federation (BWF). The BWF World Tour is divided into levels of World Tour Finals, Super 1000, Super 750, Super 500, Super 300 (part of the HSBC World Tour), and the BWF Tour Super 100.

Men's singles
Year	Tournament	Level	Opponent	Score	Result
2018	U.S. Open	Super 300	(Netherlands) Mark Caljouw	14–21, 21–17, 21–16	(gold) Winner

=== BWF Grand Prix ===
The BWF Grand Prix had two levels, the Grand Prix and Grand Prix Gold. It was a series of badminton tournaments sanctioned by the Badminton World Federation (BWF) and played between 2007 and 2017.

Men's singles
Year	Tournament	Opponent	Score	Result
2012	Korea Grand Prix Gold	(Thailand) Tanongsak Saensomboonsuk	21–17, 21–14	(gold) Winner
2014	Korea Grand Prix	(South Korea) Lee Hyun-il	21–18, 24–22	(gold) Winner
2015	Korea Masters	(South Korea) Lee Hyun-il	17–21, 21–14, 21–14	(gold) Winner
2015	Mexico City Grand Prix	(Thailand) Pannawit Thongnuam	19–21, 21–13, 21–12	(gold) Winner

BWF Grand Prix Gold tournament
BWF Grand Prix tournament

=== BWF International Challenge/Series ===
Men's singles
Year	Tournament	Opponent	Score	Result
2011	Vietnam International	(Singapore) Ashton Chen	18–21, 21–17, 21–19	(gold) Winner

BWF International Challenge tournament
BWF International Series tournament
