= Park Sung-min =

South Korean badminton player (born 1990)

Personal information
- Born: 12 May 1990 (age 36) Incheon, South Korea

Sport
- Country: South Korea
- Sport: Badminton

Men's singles
- Highest ranking: 80 (26 September 2013)
- BWF profile
Medal record
Men's badminton
Representing South Korea
World Junior Championships
Gold medal – first place	2006 Incheon	Mixed team
Silver medal – second place	2007 Waitakere City	Mixed team
Silver medal – second place	2008 Pune	Mixed team
Asia Junior Championships
Silver medal – second place	2008 Kuala Lumpur	Boys' singles
Silver medal – second place	2008 Kuala Lumpur	Mixed team

Park Sung-min (Korean: 박성민; born 12 May 1990) is a South Korean badminton player. Park started playing badminton in 1999, and as a junior player he was the runner-up of the 2007 German Junior International tournament. He was a part of the Korean junior team who win the mixed team silver medal at the 2007 and 2008 World Junior Championships. At the 2008 Asian Junior Championships, he won the silver medals in the boys' singles and mixed team event.

== Achievements ==
=== Asian Junior Championships ===
Boys' singles
Year	Venue	Opponent	Score	Result
2008	Stadium Juara; Kuala Lumpur, Malaysia	(China) Wang Zhengming	10–21, 14–21	Silver

=== BWF International Challenge/Series ===
Men's singles
Year	Tournament	Opponent	Score	Result
2017	Mongolia International	(South Korea) Gu Mu-yeong	21–15, 13–21, 21–13	(gold) Winner

BWF International Challenge tournament
BWF International Series tournament
