= Gao Huan (badminton) =

Chinese badminton player (born 1990)

Gao Huan 高欢
Personal information
- Born: 20 January 1990 (age 36) Liaoning, China
- Height: 1.83 m (6 ft 0 in)
- Weight: 74 kg (163 lb)

Sport
- Country: China
- Sport: Badminton

Men's singles
- Highest ranking: 21 (26 September 2013)
- BWF profile
Medal record
Men's badminton
Representing China
Asian Games
Silver medal – second place	2014 Incheon	Men's team
East Asian Games
Gold medal – first place	2013 Tianjin	Men's team
Summer Universiade
Silver medal – second place	2013 Kazan	Men's singles
Silver medal – second place	2013 Kazan	Mixed team
Silver medal – second place	2015 Gwangju	Mixed team
World Junior Championships
Gold medal – first place	2007 Waitakere City	Mixed team
Gold medal – first place	2008 Pune	Mixed team
Silver medal – second place	2008 Pune	Boys' singles
Bronze medal – third place	2007 Waitakere City	Boys' singles
Asian Junior Championships
Gold medal – first place	2008 Kuala Lumpur	Mixed team
Bronze medal – third place	2008 Kuala Lumpur	Boys' singles

Gao Huan (Chinese: 高欢, born 20 January 1990) is a Chinese badminton player. As of 2024, he works as the Executive Coach at New Jersey Badminton Club.

== Achievements ==
=== Summer Universiade ===
Men's singles
Year	Venue	Opponent	Score	Result
2013	Tennis Academy; Kazan, Russia	(Thailand) Tanongsak Saensomboonsuk	12–21, 17–21	Silver

=== BWF World Junior Championships ===
Boys' singles
Year	Venue	Opponent	Score	Result
2007	The Trusts Stadium; Waitakere City, New Zealand	(China) Chen Long	15–17 retired	Bronze
2008	Shree Shiv Chhatrapati Badminton Hall; Pune, India	(China) Wang Zhengming	13–21, 16–21	Silver

=== Asian Junior Championships ===
Boys' singles
Year	Venue	Opponent	Score	Result
2008	Stadium Juara; Kuala Lumpur, Malaysia	(South Korea) Park Sung-min	18–21, 18–21	Bronze

=== BWF Grand Prix ===
The BWF Grand Prix had two levels, the Grand Prix and Grand Prix Gold. It was a series of badminton tournaments sanctioned by the Badminton World Federation (BWF) and played between 2007 and 2017.

Men's singles
Year	Tournament	Opponent	Score	Result
2012	Macau Open	(China) Chen Yuekun	9–21, 17–21	(silver) Runner-up

BWF Grand Prix Gold tournament
BWF Grand Prix tournament
