= Wang Zhengming =

Chinese badminton player (born 1990)

Wang Zhengming 王睁茗
Personal information
- Born: 16 February 1990 (age 36) Guangzhou, Guangdong, China
- Height: 1.83 m (6 ft 0 in)

Sport
- Country: China
- Sport: Badminton
- Handedness: Right
- Retired: 9 September 2016

Men's singles
- Highest ranking: 6 (24 July 2014)
- BWF profile
Medal record
Men's badminton
Representing China
Asian Championships
Silver medal – second place	2010 New Delhi	Men's singles
Bronze medal – third place	2013 Taipei	Men's singles
Bronze medal – third place	2015 Wuhan	Men's singles
East Asian Games
Gold medal – first place	2013 Tianjin	Men's team
Silver medal – second place	2013 Tianjin	Men's singles
World Junior Championships
Gold medal – first place	2007 Waitakere City	Mixed team
Gold medal – first place	2008 Pune	Boys' singles
Gold medal – first place	2008 Pune	Mixed team
Asian Junior Championships
Gold medal – first place	2008 Kuala Lumpur	Boys' singles
Gold medal – first place	2008 Kuala Lumpur	Mixed team

Wang Zhengming
- Traditional Chinese: 王睜茗
- Simplified Chinese: 王睁茗
Transcriptions
Standard Mandarin
- Hanyu Pinyin: Wáng Zhēngmíng

Wang Zhengming (王睁茗) (born 16 February 1990) is a Chinese badminton player from Guangzhou, Guangdong. He was the boys' singles gold medalist at the 2008 Asian and World Junior Championships.

== Career ==
=== 2010 ===
A World and Asian Junior Champion two years earlier, 2010 was Wang's breakthrough year on the international badminton scene. His most impressive achievements were finishing runner-up to Lin Dan in the Asian Championships and reaching the semi-finals of the China Masters BWF Superseries event. By the end of the year, Wang's ranking had risen over 200 places to 43rd.

=== 2011 ===
Wang reached the quarter-finals of the first Superseries Premier event, the Korea Open, registering an impressive 21–11, 21–14 victory over reigning World Champion Chen Jin along the way. Wang also reached the semi-finals of the Singapore Open beating former Olympic and two-time Asian games winner Taufik Hidayat of Indonesia.

=== 2013 ===
In March, Wang won his first senior international title, the Swiss Open, beating compatriot Du Pengyu in the final 21–18 21–18. Wang lost in the third round of the 2013 BWF World Championships in August from first seed Malaysian Lee Chong Wei. In September, at his home China in the city of Changzhou, Wang won his first Superseries event, the China Masters, beating the Dane Jan Ø. Jørgensen 21–13, 16–21, 23–21 in a grueling semi-final match and then Korean qualifier Son Wan-ho in another close 3 games final 11–22, 21–14, 24–22. Again at his home country in October, he lost the final of the East Asian Games in Tianjin from compatriot Du Pengyu. In November, Wang also reached the final of his first Superseries Premier event, the China Open in Shanghai, along the way beating fifth seed Tommy Sugiarto from Indonesia 21–15, 14–21, 21–18 in the 3rd round, compatriot and 3rd seed Du Pengyu 21–17, 21–8 in the quarterfinals, Japanese talent Kento Momota 22–20, 9–21, 21–6 in the semi-final and ultimately losing to compatriot Chen Long in a 3 games final 21–19, 8–21, 14–21.

=== 2014 ===
In July 2014, Wang lost the final of the Chinese Taipei Open from compatriot Lin Dan: 19–21, 14–21.

After beating Kento Momota of Japan in the semi-finals of the French Open, Wang lost to Chou Tien-chen in the finals 21–10, 23–25, 19–21.

=== 2015 ===
In April 2014, Wang wins the China Masters in Changzhou beating compatriot Huang Yuxiang 22–20, 21–19 in the finals.

=== 2016 ===
On 9 September 2016, Gong Weijie, a former Chinese national player, revealed that Wang has retired from the national team.

== Achievements ==
=== Asian Championships ===
Men's singles
Year	Venue	Opponent	Score	Result
2010	Siri Fort Indoor Stadium; New Delhi, India	(China) Lin Dan	17–21, 15–21	Silver
2013	Taipei Arena; Taipei, Taiwan	(China) Du Pengyu	16–21, 6–11 retired	Bronze
2015	Wuhan Sports Center Gymnasium; Wuhan, China	(China) Lin Dan	14–21, 17–21	Bronze

=== East Asian Games ===
Men's singles
Year	Venue	Opponent	Score	Result
2013	Binhai New Area Dagang Gymnasium; Tianjin, China	(China) Du Pengyu	20–22, 17–21	Silver

=== BWF World Junior Championships ===
Boys' singles
Year	Venue	Opponent	Score	Result
2008	Shree Shiv Chhatrapati Badminton Hall; Pune, India	(China) Gao Huan	21–13, 21–16	Gold

=== Asian Junior Championships ===
Boys' singles
Year	Venue	Opponent	Score	Result
2008	Stadium Juara; Kuala Lumpur, Malaysia	(South Korea) Park Sung-min	21–10, 21–14	Gold

=== BWF Superseries ===
The BWF Superseries, which was launched on 14 December 2006 and implemented in 2007, was a series of elite badminton tournaments, sanctioned by the Badminton World Federation (BWF). BWF Superseries levels were Superseries and Superseries Premier. A season of Superseries consisted of twelve tournaments around the world that had been introduced since 2011. Successful players were invited to the Superseries Finals, which were held at the end of each year.

Men's singles
Year	Tournament	Opponent	Score	Result
2012	Singapore Open	(Thailand) Boonsak Ponsana	18–21, 19–21	(silver) Runner-up
2012	China Open	(China) Chen Long	19–21, 18–21	(silver) Runner-up
2013	China Masters	(South Korea) Son Wan-ho	11–21, 21–14, 24–22	(gold) Winner
2013	China Open	(China) Chen Long	21–19, 8–21, 14–21	(silver) Runner-up
2014	French Open	(Chinese Taipei) Chou Tien-chen	21–10, 23–25, 19–21	(silver) Runner-up

BWF Super Series Finals tournament
BWF Super Series Premier tournament
BWF Super Series tournament

=== BWF Grand Prix ===
The BWF Grand Prix had two levels, the Grand Prix and Grand Prix Gold. It was a series of badminton tournaments sanctioned by the Badminton World Federation (BWF) and played between 2007 and 2017.

Men's singles
Year	Tournament	Opponent	Score	Result
2010	Korea Grand Prix	(China) Bao Chunlai	21–23, 18–21	(silver) Runner-up
2011	Bitburger Open	(Denmark) Hans-Kristian Vittinghus	18–21, 10–21	(silver) Runner-up
2013	Swiss Open	(China) Du Pengyu	21–18, 21–18	(gold) Winner
2014	Chinese Taipei Open	(China) Lin Dan	19–21, 14–21	(silver) Runner-up
2015	China Masters	(China) Huang Yuxiang	22–20, 21–19	(gold) Winner

BWF Grand Prix Gold tournament
BWF Grand Prix tournament
