= Kenichi Tago =

Japanese badminton player

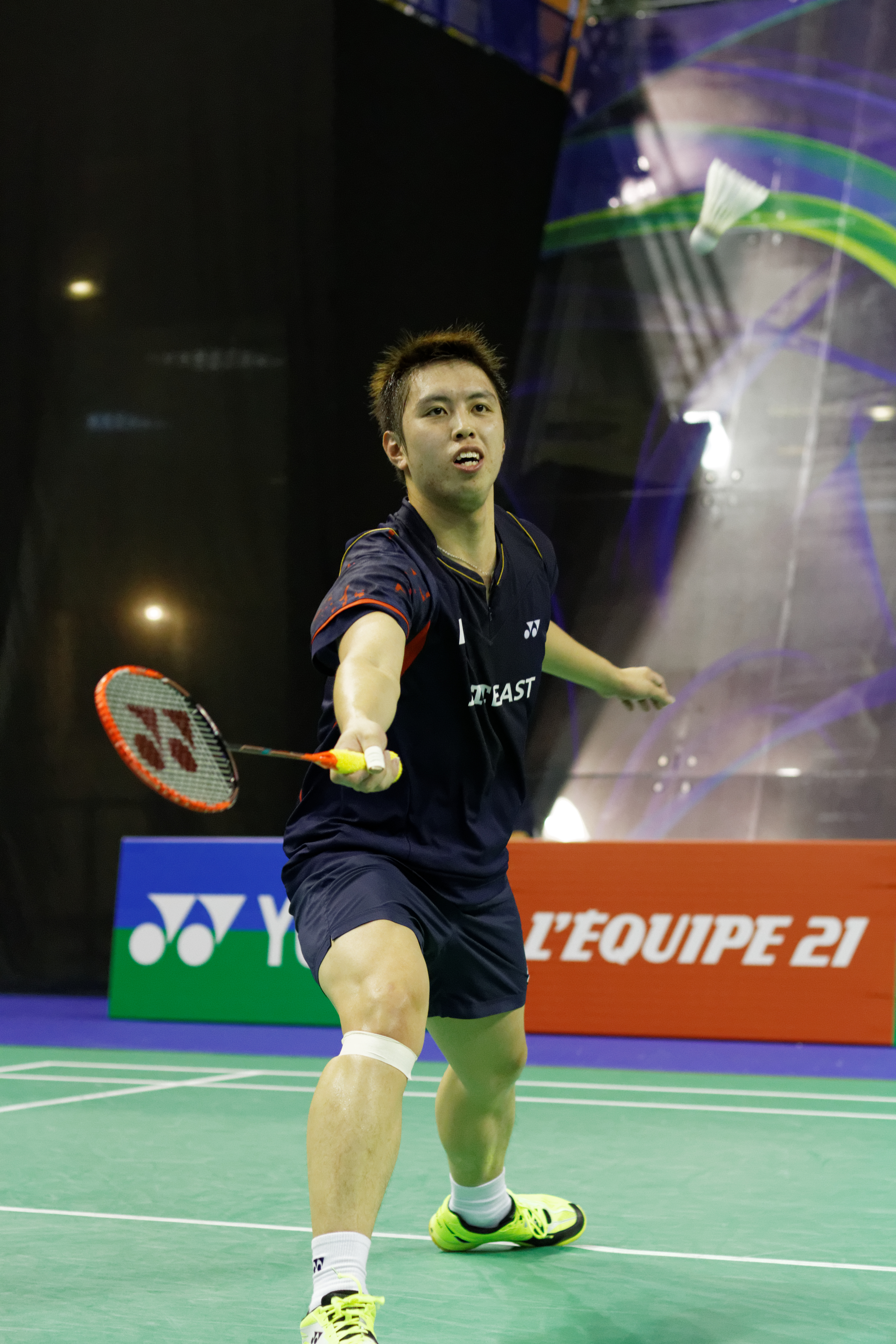
- Kenichi Tago at the 2013 French Super Series.

Personal information
- Born: 16 July 1989 (age 36) Warabi, Saitama, Japan
- Height: 1.76 m (5 ft 9 in)
- Weight: 72 kg (159 lb)（active era） 107.42 kg (236.8 lb)(2020-present)

Sport
- Country: Japan
- Sport: Badminton
- Handedness: Right

Men's singles
- Highest ranking: 3 (3 April 2014)
- BWF profile
Medal record
Men's badminton
Representing Japan
Thomas Cup
Gold medal – first place	2014 New Delhi	Men's team
Bronze medal – third place	2010 Kuala Lumpur	Men's team
Bronze medal – third place	2012 Wuhan	Men's team
Asian Championships
Bronze medal – third place	2010 New Delhi	Men's singles
East Asian Games
Bronze medal – third place	2009 Hong Kong	Men's team
World Junior Championships
Silver medal – second place	2007 Waitakere City	Boys' singles
Asian Junior Championships
Gold medal – first place	2006 Kuala Lumpur	Boys' singles
Bronze medal – third place	2007 Kuala Lumpur	Mixed team

Kenichi Tago (田児賢一, Tago Ken'ichi; born 16 July 1989) is a Japanese former professional badminton player. He is the son of former badminton player Yoshiko Yonekura. In 2010, he reached the final of the All England Open Badminton Championships. En route to the final, he beat three seeded players, including Nguyễn Tiến Minh, Chen Jin and Bao Chunlai. In the final, Tago lost to the first seed and reigning World No. 1 Lee Chong Wei from Malaysia with a score of 21–19 and 21–19, following an incorrect line call in Lee Chong Wei's favour at match point. In 2012, he competed at the London 2012 Summer Olympics in the men's singles event, but did not advance to the knock-out stage after being defeated by Niluka Karunaratne of Sri Lanka with a score of 18–21, 16–21. In 2014, he reached the Indonesia Open final after a shocking win over Lee Chong Wei in the semifinal but could not keep up his good form and went on to lose by straight games in the final to Jan Ø. Jørgensen of Denmark. He competed at the 2010 and 2014 Asian Games.

== Achievements ==
=== Asian Championships ===
Men's singles

Year	Venue	Opponent	Score	Result
2010	Siri Fort Indoor Stadium, New Delhi, India	(China) Wang Zhengming	14–21, 21–19, 16–21	Bronze

=== BWF World Junior Championships ===
Boys' singles

Year	Venue	Opponent	Score	Result
2007	The Trusts Stadium, Waitakere City, New Zealand	(China) Chen Long	16–21, 14–21	Silver

=== Asian Junior Championships ===
Boys' singles

Year	Venue	Opponent	Score	Result
2006	Kuala Lumpur Badminton Stadium, Kuala Lumpur, Malaysia	(South Korea) Han Ki-hoon	21–13, 16–21, 26–24	Gold

=== BWF Super Series ===
The BWF Super Series, launched on 14 December 2006 and implemented in 2007, was a series of elite badminton tournaments, sanctioned by Badminton World Federation (BWF). BWF Super Series had two level such as Super Series and Super Series Premier. A season of the Super Series featured a total of twelve tournaments around the world since the 2011 season, with successful players invited to the Super Series Finals held at the year end.

Men's singles

Year	Tournament	Opponent	Score	Result
2010	All England Open	(Malaysia) Lee Chong Wei	19–21, 19–21	(silver) Runner-up
2011	French Open	(Malaysia) Lee Chong Wei	16–21, 11–21	(silver) Runner-up
2012	Malaysia Open	(Malaysia) Lee Chong Wei	6–21, 13–21	(silver) Runner-up
2013	India Open	(Malaysia) Lee Chong Wei	15–21, 21–18, 17–21	(silver) Runner-up
2013	Japan Open	(Malaysia) Lee Chong Wei	21–23, 17–21	(silver) Runner-up
2013	French Open	(Denmark) Jan Ø. Jørgensen	19–21, 21–23	(silver) Runner-up
2014	Indonesia Open	(Denmark) Jan Ø. Jørgensen	18–21, 18–21	(silver) Runner-up

BWF Super Series Premier tournament
BWF Superseries tournament

=== BWF International Challenge/Series ===
Men's singles

Year	Tournament	Opponent	Score	Result
2007	Swedish International	(Denmark) Jens Kristian Leth	21–15, 21–15	(gold) Winner
2007	Scottish International	(Germany) Björn Joppien	11–21, 21–15, 21–18	(gold) Winner
2007	Korea International	(South Korea) Shon Seung-mo	15–21, 21–18, 10–21	(silver) Runner-up
2008	Belgian International	(India) Chetan Anand	21–16, 15–21, 21–19	(gold) Winner

BWF International Challenge tournament
BWF International Series tournament

== Record against selected opponents ==
Includes results against Olympic quarterfinals, Worlds semifinalists, and Super Series finalists, as well as all Olympic opponents.

- (China) Chen Jin 2–3
- (China) Chen Yu 1–1
- (China) Chen Long 4–7
- (China) Bao Chunlai 2–0
- (China) Lin Dan 1–3
- (China) Wang Zhengming 1–3
- (China) Du Pengyu 2–2
- (Chinese Taipei) Hsieh Yu-hsing 1–0
- (Denmark) Jan Ø. Jørgensen 7–7
- (Denmark) Joachim Persson 2–0
- (Denmark) Peter Gade 1–3
- (Denmark) Viktor Axelsen 2–2
- (Germany) Marc Zwiebler 5–0
- (Hong Kong) Hu Yun 6–2
- (India) Parupalli Kashyap 3–2
- (India) Srikanth Kidambi 2–0
- (Indonesia) Simon Santoso 2–2
- (Indonesia) Sony Dwi Kuncoro 1–7
- (Indonesia) Taufik Hidayat 2–4
- (Indonesia) Tommy Sugiarto 1–3
- (Japan) Sho Sasaki 3–2
- (South Korea) Shon Seung-mo 0–2
- (South Korea) Lee Hyun-il 0–1
- (South Korea) Park Sung-hwan 0–3
- (South Korea) Park Tae-sang 0–1
- (South Korea) Shon Wan-ho 2–3
- (Malaysia) Lee Chong Wei 2–17
- (Malaysia) Liew Daren 2–0
- (Malaysia) Wong Choong Hann 1–4
- (Malaysia) Chong Wei Feng 5–1
- (Singapore) Ronald Susilo 1–0
- (Sri Lanka) Niluka Karunaratne 0–1
- (Thailand) Boonsak Ponsana 2–1
- (Vietnam) Nguyễn Tiến Minh 2–1

== Gambling scandal ==
In October 2015, Tago was removed from Japan's national team by head coach Park Joo-bong due to indiscipline, after he repeatedly missed training sessions and was proving to be a bad influence to other players. On 8 April 2016, Tago admitted to squandering 10 million Japanese yen over a period of 2 years after making over 60 visits to illegal casinos alongside other professional players, including countryman Kento Momota, who was banned from competition until late 2017 and forced to miss the Olympic Games as a result. Gambling in Japan is illegal, with frequent gambling punishable with imprisonment of up to 3 years.
