= 2012 Denmark Super Series Premier =

Tournament details
- Dates: 16–21 October 2012
- Total prize money: US$400,000
- Venue: Odense Sports Park
- Location: Odense

The 2012 Denmark Super Series was a top level badminton competition held from October 16, 2012, to October 21, 2012, in Odense, Denmark. It was the ninth BWF Super Series competition on the 2012 BWF Super Series schedule. The total purse for the event was $400,000.

== Men's singles ==
=== Seeds ===
1. (Malaysia) Lee Chong Wei (champion)
2. (China) Chen Long (semifinals)
3. (China) Chen Jin (first round)
4. (Indonesia) Simon Santoso (second round)
5. (Japan) Sho Sasaki (second round)
6. (Denmark) Peter Gade (first round)
7. (China) Du Pengyu (final)
8. (Japan) Kenichi Tago (second round)

=== Top half ===
First Round
1	(Malaysia) Lee C W	21	21
(Denmark) V Axelsen	8	18
(Thailand) B Ponsana	21	21
PFQ	(France) B Leverdez	12	15
5	(Japan) S Sasaki	14	21	21
Q4	(India) A Pawar	21	15	11
(Malaysia) Liew DR	21	21
(England) R Ouseph	17	9
3	(China) Chen J	21	11	15
Q2	(Thailand) S Avihingsanon	11	21	21
Q1	(Republic of Ireland) S Evans	21	12	16
(Hong Kong) Wong W K	17	21	21
8	(Japan) K Tago	17	21	21
(Denmark) H-K Vittinghus	21	17	17
(Russia) V Ivanov	16	18
(Denmark) J Ø Jørgensen	21	21

Second Round
1	(Malaysia) Lee C W	21	21
(Thailand) B Ponsana	11	16
5	(Japan) S Sasaki	17	14
(Malaysia) Liew DR	21	21
Q2	(Thailand) S Avihingsanon	13	12
(Hong Kong) Wong W K	21	21
8	(Japan) K Tago	18	21	11
(Denmark) J Ø Jørgensen	21	17	21

Quarterfinals
1	(Malaysia) Lee C W	21	21
(Malaysia) Liew DR	16	16
(Hong Kong) Wong W K	21	13
(Denmark) J Ø Jørgensen	23	21

Semifinals
1	(Malaysia) Lee C W	22	21
(Denmark) J Ø Jørgensen	20	15

=== Bottom half ===
First Round
(Germany) M Zwiebler	21	16	21
(Indonesia) D H Rumbaka	14	21	8
(India) A Jayaram	21	8	9
7	(China) Du PY	19	21	21
(Malaysia) Tan C S	w	/	o
(Indonesia) T Sugiarto
(Malaysia) Chong W F	21	17	17
4	(Indonesia) S Santoso	16	21	21
(Japan) T Ueda	21	19	13
(Indonesia) S D Kuncoro	15	21	21
(India) S Varma	21	21
6	(Denmark) P Gade	18	14
(China) Wang ZM	21	21
Q3	(Ukraine) D Zavadsky	13	11
(Hong Kong) Hu Y	19	21	18
2	(China) Chen L	21	13	21

Second Round
(Germany) M Zwiebler	20	17
7	(China) Du PY	22	21
(Malaysia) Tan C S	21	21
4	(Indonesia) S Santoso	14	19
(Indonesia) S D Kuncoro	21	21
(India) S Varma	19	17
(China) Wang ZM	19	14
2	(China) Chen L	21	21

Quarterfinals
7	(China) Du PY	21	21
(Malaysia) Tan C S	19
(Indonesia) S D Kuncoro	8	15
2	(China) Chen L	21	21

Semifinals
7	(China) Du PY	21	21
2	(China) Chen L	14	10

=== Finals ===
Semifinals
1	(Malaysia) Lee Chong Wei	22	21
(Denmark) Jan Ø. Jørgensen	20	15
7	(China) Du Pengyu	21	21
2	(China) Chen Long	14	10

Final
1	(Malaysia) Lee Chong Wei	15	21	21
7	(China) Du Pengyu	21	12	19

== Women's singles ==
=== Seeds ===
1. (China) Wang Yihan (semifinals)
2. (China) Li Xuerui (quarterfinals)
3. (India) Saina Nehwal
4. (China) Wang Shixian (quarterfinals)
5. (Denmark) Tine Baun (quarterfinals)
6. (Germany) Juliane Schenk
7. (South Korea) Sung Ji-hyun (quarterfinals)
8. (China) Jiang Yanjiao (semifinals)

=== Top half ===
First Round
1	(China) Wang YH	21	21
(Thailand) S Ponsana	11
(Singapore) Gu J	21	20	24
(Indonesia) M F Kusumastuti	12	22	22
7	(South Korea) Sung J-h	21	21
(Netherlands) Yao J	15	18
Q4	(Japan) Kaori Imabeppu	15	18
(Thailand) P Buranaprasertsuk	21	21
3	(India) S Nehwal	21	21
(South Korea) Bae Y-j	17	17
(Indonesia) A Yuswandari	15	20
(Japan) M Mitani	21	22
5	(Denmark) T Baun	21	21
(Hong Kong) Chan T K	16	16
Q3	(Hong Kong) Poon L-Y	21	11	21
(China) Chen X J	13	21	19

Second Round
1	(China) Wang YH	22	21
(Singapore) Gu J	20	14
7	(South Korea) Sung J-h	17	21	21
(Thailand) P Buranaprasertsuk	21	18	10
3	(India) S Nehwal	21	21
(Japan) M Mitani	15	14
5	(Denmark) T Baun	21	21
Q3	(Hong Kong) Poon L-Y	19	13

Quarterfinals
1	(China) Wang YH	21	16	21
7	(South Korea) Sung J-h	13	21	8
3	(India) S Nehwal	21	21
5	(Denmark) T Baun	10	11

Semifinals
1	(China) Wang YH	12	7^{r}
3	(India) S Nehwal	21	12

=== Bottom half ===
First Round
(Bulgaria) P Nedelcheva	15	21	21
(Czech Republic) K Gavnholt	21	11	14
(Indonesia) A Firdasari	13	11
8	(China) Jiang YJ	21	21
(Hong Kong) Yip PY	21	16	15
Q2	(Thailand) N Jindapon	19	21	21
(Bulgaria) Linda Zetchiri	21
4	(China) Wang SX	16	23	21
Q1	(Russia) R Gabdullina	13	6
(Thailand) S Taerattanachai	21	21
(Japan) E Hirose	18	12
6	(Germany) J Schenk	21	21
(Indonesia) B Manuputi	21	22
(Australia) Michelle C K	17	20
(Thailand) R Intanon	19	14
2	(China) Li XR	21	21

Second Round
(Bulgaria) P Nedelcheva	6	14
8	(China) Jiang YJ	21	21
Q2	(Thailand) N Jindapon	20	21	20
4	(China) Wang SX	22	17	22
(Thailand) S Taerattanachai	14	16
6	(Germany) J Schenk	21	21
(Indonesia) B Manuputi	17	14
2	(China) Li XR	21	21

Quarterfinals
8	(China) Jiang YJ	21	21
4	(China) Wang SX	19	12
6	(Germany) J Schenk	21	21
2	(China) Li XR	19	12

Semifinals
8	(China) Jiang YJ	21	14	15
6	(Germany) J Schenk	13	21	21

=== Finals ===
Semifinals
1	(China) Wang Yihan	12	7
3	(India) Saina Nehwal	21	12^{r}
8	(China) Jiang Yanjiao	21	14	15
6	(Germany) Juliane Schenk	13	21	21

Final
3	(India) Saina Nehwal	21	21
6	(Germany) Juliane Schenk	17	8

== Men's doubles ==
=== Seeds ===
1. (Denmark) Mathias Boe / Carsten Mogensen (semifinal)
2. (China) Cai Yun / Fu Haifeng (first round)
3. (Malaysia) Koo Kien Keat / Tan Boon Heong (final)
4. (Japan) Hiroyuki Endo / Kenichi Hayakawa (quarterfinal)
5. (China) Hong Wei / Shen Ye (first round)
6. (Japan) Hirokatsu Hashimoto / Noriyasu Hirata (quarterfinal)
7. (Korea) Kim Ki-jung / Kim Sa-rang (quarterfinal)
8. (Thailand) Bodin Issara / Maneepong Jongjit (quarterfinal)

=== Top half ===
First Round
1	(Denmark) M Boe (Denmark) C Mogensen	26	22	21
(England) C Adcock (England) A Ellis	28	20	19
PFQ	(England) C Langridge (England) P Mills	21	17	21
(Thailand) P Chalardchaleam (Thailand) N Puangpuapech	18	21	11
7	(South Korea) Kim K-j (South Korea) Kim S-r	21	21
PFQ	(Thailand) S Anugritayawon (Thailand) S Prapakamol	17	10
(China) Guo ZD (China) Xu C	18	22	19
(Germany) M Fuchs (Germany) O Roth	21	20	21
3	(Malaysia) Koo K K (Malaysia) Tan B H	8	21	21
(South Korea) Ko S-h (South Korea) Lee Y-d	21	16	19
Q1	(Denmark) J Fischer Nielsen (Denmark) J Rasmussen	21	21
(Denmark) R Bonde (Denmark) M Conrad-Petersen	16	17
8	(Thailand) B Issara (Thailand) M Jongjit	21	19	21
(Indonesia) B Septano (Indonesia) A Y Wirawan	13	21	15
(India) T Kona (India) A Vishnu	20	19
(Indonesia) A Pratama (Indonesia) R A Saputro	22	21

Second Round
1	(Denmark) M Boe (Denmark) C Mogensen	21	21
PFQ	(England) C Langridge (England) P Mills	10	17
7	(South Korea) Kim K-j (South Korea) Kim S-r	21	21
(Germany) M Fuchs (Germany) O Roth	17	10
3	(Malaysia) Koo K K (Malaysia) Tan B H	w	/	o
Q1	(Denmark) J Fischer Nielsen (Denmark) J Rasmussen
8	(Thailand) B Issara (Thailand) M Jongjit	21	21
(Indonesia) A Pratama (Indonesia) R A Saputro	19	13

Quarterfinals
1	(Denmark) M Boe (Denmark) C Mogensen	24	22
7	(South Korea) Kim K-j (South Korea) Kim S-r	22	20
3	(Malaysia) Koo K K (Malaysia) Tan B H	21	21
8	(Thailand) B Issara (Thailand) M Jongjit	16	17

Semifinals
1	(Denmark) M Boe (Denmark) C Mogensen	21	11	24
3	(Malaysia) Koo K K (Malaysia) Tan B H	19	21	26

=== Bottom half ===
First Round
Q2	(Indonesia) Y S Dasuki (Indonesia) H A Gunawan	21	22
(Germany) I Kindervater (Germany) J Schöttler	16	20
(Indonesia) M Ahsan (Indonesia) H Setiawan	21	21
5	(China) H Wei (China) Shen Y	14	16
(Russia) V Ivanov (Russia) I Sozonov	20	13
(Malaysia) Hoon T H (Malaysia) Tan W K	22	21
(Netherlands) J Arends (Netherlands) J Maas	17	17
4	(Japan) H Endo (Japan) K Hayakawa	21	21
Q3	(Indonesia) A Y Chandra (Indonesia) M Kido	18	19
Q4	(China) Chai B (China) Zhang N	21	21
(Poland) L Moren (Poland) W Szkudlarczyk	16	11
6	(Japan) H Hashimoto (Japan) N Hirata	21	21
(Netherlands) J De Ruiter (Netherlands) D Khodabux	17	21	21
(Malaysia) Gan T C (Malaysia) Ong S H	21	12	14
(South Korea) Shin B-c (South Korea) Yoo Y-s	20
2	(China) Cai Y (China) Fu HF	17^{r}

Second Round
Q2	(Indonesia) Y S Dasuki (Indonesia) H A Gunawan	23	10	20
(Indonesia) M Ahsan (Indonesia) H Setiawan	21	21	22
(Malaysia) Hoon T H (Malaysia) Tan W K	21	13	17
4	(Japan) H Endo (Japan) K Hayakawa	19	21	21
Q4	(China) Chai B (China) Zhang N	16	16
6	(Japan) H Hashimoto (Japan) N Hirata	21	21
(Netherlands) J De Ruiter (Netherlands) D Khodabux	16	10
(South Korea) Shin B-c (South Korea) Yoo Y-s	21	21

Quarterfinals
(Indonesia) M Ahsan (Indonesia) H Setiawan	21	24
4	(Japan) H Endo (Japan) K Hayakawa	18	22
6	(Japan) H Hashimoto (Japan) N Hirata	7	19
(South Korea) Shin B-c (South Korea) Yoo Y-s	21	21

Semifinals
(Indonesia) M Ahsan (Indonesia) H Setiawan	17	15
(South Korea) Shin B-c (South Korea) Yoo Y-s	21	21

=== Finals ===
Semifinals
1	(Denmark) Mathias Boe (Denmark) Carsten Mogensen	21	11	24
3	(Malaysia) Koo Kien Keat (Malaysia) Tan Boon Heong	19	21	26
(Indonesia) Mohammad Ahsan (Indonesia) Hendra Setiawan	17	15
(South Korea) Shin Baek-cheol (South Korea) Yoo Yeon-seong	21	21

Final
3	(Malaysia) Koo Kien Keat (Malaysia) Tan Boon Heong	21	11	19
(South Korea) Shin Baek-cheol (South Korea) Yoo Yeon-seong	19	21	21

== Women's doubles ==
=== Seeds ===
1. (China) Tian Qing / Zhao Yunlei
2. (China) Wang Xiaoli / Yu Yang
3. (China) Bao Yixin / Zhong Qianxin
4. (Denmark) Christinna Pedersen / Kamilla Rytter Juhl
5. (Japan) Shizuka Matsuo / Mami Naito
6. (Japan) Misaki Matsutomo / Ayaka Takahashi
7. (Korea) Eom Hye-won / Jang Ye-na
8. (Hong Kong) Poon Lok Yan / Tse Ying Suet

=== Top half ===
First Round
1	(China) Tian Q (China) Zhao YL	21	21
(Malaysia) Chin E H (Malaysia) Goh L Y	13	11
Q1	(Denmark) C Martens (Denmark) M Sejr Nielsen	21	20	19
(Denmark) J Christiansen (Denmark) L Hansen	12	22	21
5	(Japan) S Matsuo (Japan) M Naito	21	21
(Netherlands) S Piek (Netherlands) I Tabeling	15	11
PFQ	(Denmark) M Fruergård (Denmark) S Thygesen	5	10
(China) Cheng S (China) Luo Y	21	21
4	(Denmark) C Pedersen (Denmark) K Rytter Juhl	24	14
(Indonesia) A F Agustin (Indonesia) N K Maheswari	26	21
Q3	(Denmark) I Neilsen (Denmark) M Surrow	10	10
Q4	(Bulgaria) P Nedelcheva (Bulgaria) D Popstoikova	21	21
6	(Japan) M Matsutomo (Japan) A Takahashi	21	15	21
(Indonesia) P Z Bernadeth (Indonesia) R A Pradipta	11	21	19
(Thailand) N Lam (Thailand) S Thoungthongkam	21	21
(Russia) T Bibik (Russia) A Chervaykova	18	12

Second Round
1	(China) Tian Q (China) Zhao YL	21	21
(Denmark) J Christiansen (Denmark) L Hansen	15	5
5	(Japan) S Matsuo (Japan) M Naito	21	13	21
(China) Cheng S (China) Luo Y	13	21	16
(Indonesia) A F Agustin (Indonesia) N K Maheswari	21	21
Q4	(Bulgaria) P Nedelcheva (Bulgaria) D Popstoikova	10	6
6	(Japan) M Matsutomo (Japan) A Takahashi	19	22	21
(Thailand) N Lam (Thailand) S Thoungthongkam	21	20	15

Quarterfinals
1	(China) Tian Q (China) Zhao YL	21	21
5	(Japan) S Matsuo (Japan) M Naito	12	9
(Indonesia) A F Agustin (Japan) N K Maheswari	18	21	11
6	(Japan) M Matsutomo (Japan) A Takahashi	21	13	21

Semifinals
1	(China) Tian Q (China) Zhao YL	15	21	10
6	(Japan) M Matsutomo (Japan) A Takahashi	21	13	21

=== Bottom half ===
First Round
(France) A Fontaine (France) E Lefel	19	14
(Thailand) D Aroonkesorn (Thailand) K Voravichitchaikul	21	21
(Denmark) C Juel (Denmark) J Van Zåne	7	13
7	(South Korea) Eom H-w (South Korea) Jang Y-n	21	21
(England) L Smith (England) G White	17	21	9
(Indonesia) S R Andini (Indonesia) D D Haris	21	17	21
Q2	(Denmark) J Finne-Ipsen (Denmark) R S. Hansen	9	10
3	(China) Bao YX (China) Zhong QX	21	21
(Thailand) S Amitrapai (Thailand) S Taerattanachai	21	21
(Germany) J Goliszewski (Germany) B Michels	19	17
(Indonesia) G R Imawan (Indonesia) T R Nuraidah	12	13
8	(Hong Kong) Poon L Y (Hong Kong) Tse Y S	21	21
(China) Ma J (China) Tang JH	21	21
(South Korea) Choi H-i (South Korea) Kim S-y	16	12
(Sweden) E Lennartsson (Sweden) E Wengberg	18	21	18
PFQ	(Netherlands) I Vaessen (Netherlands) Yao J	21	15	21

Second Round
(Thailand) D Aroonkesorn (Thailand) K Voravichitchaikul	13	17
7	(South Korea) Eom H-w (South Korea) Jang Y-n	21	21
(Indonesia) S R Andini (Indonesia) D D Haris	13	21	20
3	(China) Bao YX (China) Zhong QX	21	14	22
(Thailand) S Amitrapai (Thailand) S Taerattanachai	21	21
8	(Hong Kong) Poon L Y (Hong Kong) Tse Y S	11	8
(China) Ma J (China) Tang JH	21	21
PFQ	(Netherlands) I Vaessen (Netherlands) Yao J	11	9

Quarterfinals
7	(South Korea) Eom H-w (South Korea) Jang Y-n	12	20
3	(China) Bao YX (China) Zhong QX	21	22
(Thailand) S Amitrapai (Thailand) S Taerattanachai	13	8
(China) Ma J (China) Tang JH	21	21

Semifinals
3	(China) Bao YX (China) Zhong QX	15	19
(China) Ma J (China) Tang JH	21	21

=== Finals ===
Semifinals
1	(China) Tian Qing (China) Zhao Yunlei	15	21	10
6	(Japan) Misaki Matsutomo (Japan) Ayaka Takahashi	21	13	21
3	(China) Bao Yixin (China) Zhong Qianxin	15	19
(China) Ma Jin (China) Tang Jinhua	21	21

Final
6	(Japan) Misaki Matsutomo (Japan) Ayaka Takahashi	8	12
(China) Ma Jin (China) Tang Jinhua	21	21

== Mixed doubles ==
=== Seeds ===
1. (China) Xu Chen / Ma Jin
2. (China) Zhang Nan / Zhao Yunlei
3. (Denmark) Joachim Fischer Nielsen / Christinna Pedersen
4. (Indonesia) Tantowi Ahmad / Lilyana Natsir
5. (Malaysia) Chan Peng Soon / Goh Liu Ying
6. (Thailand) Sudket Prapakamol / Saralee Thoungthongkam
7. (Poland) Robert Mateusiak / Nadiezda Zieba
8. (England) Chris Adcock / (Scotland) Imogen Bankier

=== Top half ===
First Round
1	(China) Xu C (China) Ma J	21	21
Q1	(Germany) O Roth (Germany) J Goliszewski	14	13
(France) B Careme (France) A Fontaine	16	16
Q3	(South Korea) Kim K-j (South Korea) Kim S-y	21	21
7	(Poland) R Mateusiak (Poland) N Zieba	21	16	25
(Scotland) R Blair (Indonesia) V Marissa	16	21	23
(Denmark) F Colberg (Denmark) S Thygesen	17	16
(South Korea) Shin B-c (South Korea) Eom H-w	21	21
3	(Denmark) J Fischer Nielsen (Denmark) C Pedersen	21	21
(Austria) R Zirnwald (Austria) E Baldauf	10	10
Q2	(China) Tao JM (China) Tang JH	21	21
(Indonesia) M Rijal (Indonesia) D Susanto	11	10
5	(Malaysia) Chan P S (Malaysia) Goh L Y	15	21	21
(Netherlands) D Khodabux (Netherlands) S Piek	21	17	15
(South Korea) Yoo Y-s (South Korea) Jang Y-n	16	13
(Denmark) A Kristiansen (Denmark) J Houmann	21	21

Second Round
1	(China) Xu C (China) Ma J	21	21
Q3	(South Korea) Kim K-j (South Korea) Kim S-y	19	15
7	(Poland) R Mateusiak (Poland) N Zieba	21	21
(South Korea) Shin B-c (South Korea) Eom H-w	11	14
3	(Denmark) J Fischer Nielsen (Denmark) C Pedersen	19	18
(Indonesia) M Rijal (Indonesia) D Susanto	21	21
5	(Malaysia) Chan P S (Malaysia) Goh L Y	19	22	21
(Denmark) A Kristiansen (Denmark) J Houmann	21	20	14

Quarterfinals
1	(China) Xu C (China) Ma J	21	21
7	(Poland) R Mateusiak (Poland) N Zieba	14	15
(Indonesia) M Rijal (Indonesia) D Susanto	15	11
5	(Malaysia) Chan P S (Malaysia) Goh L Y	21	21

Semifinals
1	(China) Xu C (China) Ma J	21	21
5	(Malaysia) Chan P S (Malaysia) Goh L Y	7	16

=== Bottom half ===
First Round
(Indonesia) M Kido (Indonesia) P Z Bernadeth
(India) T Kona (India) A Ponnappa
(Denmark) R Bonde (Denmark) L Kjærsfeldt
6	(Thailand) S Prapakamol (Thailand) S Thoungthongkam
(Germany) M Fuchs (Germany) B Michels	18	21	17
(Denmark) M Pieler Kolding (Denmark) K Rytter Juhl	21	17	21
(France) R Labar (France) L Choinet	9	10
4	(Indonesia) T Ahmad (Indonesia) L Natsir	21	21
(South Korea) Kim S-r (South Korea) Choi H-i	18	14
(Indonesia) F Kurniawan (Indonesia) S P Irawati	21	21
(Thailand) S Anugritayawon (Thailand) K Voravichitchaikul	21	21
8	(England) C Adcock (Scotland) I Bankier	17	11
Q4	(Thailand) P Chalardchaleam (Thailand) S Amitrapai	21	21
PFQ	(England) M Ellis (England) G White	17	18
(Japan) K Hayakawa (Japan) M Matsutomo	9	10
2	(China) Zhang N (China) Zhao YL	21	21

Second Round
(Indonesia) M Kido (Indonesia) P Z Bernadeth	21	21
6	(Thailand) S Prapakamol (Thailand) S Thoungthongkam	13	15
(Denmark) M Pieler Kolding (Denmark) K Rytter Juhl	16	14
4	(Indonesia) T Ahmad (Indonesia) L Natsir	21	21
(Indonesia) F Kurniawan (Indonesia) S P Irawati	21	21
(Thailand) S Anugritayawon (Thailand) K Voravichitchaikul	16	11
Q4	(Thailand) P Chalardchaleam (Thailand) S Amitrapai	18	12
2	(China) Zhang N (China) Zhao YL	21	21

Quarterfinals
(Indonesia) M Kido (Indonesia) P Z Bernadeth	18	15
4	(Indonesia) T Ahmad (Indonesia) L Natsir	21	21
(Indonesia) F Kurniawan (Indonesia) S P Irawati	19	18
2	(China) Zhang N (China) Zhao YL	21	21

Semifinals
4	(Indonesia) T Ahmad (Indonesia) L Natsir	21	21
2	(China) Zhang N (China) Zhao YL	12	17

=== Finals ===
Semifinals
1	(China) Xu Chen (China) Ma Jin	21	21
5	(Malaysia) Chan Peng Soon (Malaysia) Goh Liu Ying	7	16
4	(Indonesia) Tantowi Ahmad (Indonesia) Lilyana Natsir	21	21
2	(China) Zhang Nan (China) Zhao Yunlei	12	17

Final
1	(China) Xu Chen (China) Ma Jin	23	24	21
4	(Indonesia) Tantowi Ahmad (Indonesia) Lilyana Natsir	21	26	11

Preceded by 2011 Denmark Super Series Premier	Denmark Super Series	Succeeded by 2013 Denmark Super Series Premier
Preceded by 2012 Japan Super Series	2012 BWF Super Series	Succeeded by 2012 French Super Series
