= 2011 French Super Series =

Badminton championships

Tournament details
- Dates: 25 – 30 October 2011
- Level: Super Series
- Total prize money: US$200,000
- Venue: Stade Pierre de Coubertin
- Location: Paris, France

Champions
- Men's singles: (Malaysia) Lee Chong Wei
- Women's singles: (China) Wang Xin
- Men's doubles: (South Korea) Jung Jae-sung (South Korea) Lee Yong-dae
- Women's doubles: (China) Wang Xiaoli (China) Yu Yang
- Mixed doubles: (Denmark) Joachim Fischer Nielsen (Denmark) Christinna Pedersen

The 2011 French Super Series was a top level badminton competition contested from October 25, 2011, to October 30, 2011, in Paris, France. It was the tenth BWF Super Series competition on the 2011 BWF Super Series schedule. The total purse for the event was $200,000.

== Men's singles ==
=== Seeds ===
1. (Malaysia) Lee Chong Wei (Champion)
2. (China) Lin Dan
3. (China) Chen Long
4. (Denmark) Peter Gade
5. (Indonesia) Taufik Hidayat
6. (China) Chen Jin
7. (Vietnam) Nguyen Tien Minh
8. (China) Du Pengyu

=== Top half ===
First Round
1	(Malaysia) Lee C W	21	21
(Germany) M Zwiebler	16	13
Q3	(India) C Anand	13	r
(France) B Leverdez	21
7	(Vietnam) Nguyen T M	22	21
(Indonesia) T Sugiarto	20	14
(India) K Parupalli	18	21	9
(South Korea) Shon W-h	21	17	21
3	(China) Chen L	21	21
(Thailand) T Saensomboonsuk	14	13
(Denmark) H-K Vittinghus	16	21	13
PFQ	(Malaysia) Liew DR	21	12	21
5	(Indonesia) T Hidayat	17	16
(China) Wang ZM	21	21
(England) R Ouseph	22	18	21
(Lithuania) K Navickas	20	21	6

Second Round
1	(Malaysia) Lee C W	21	21
(France) B Leverdez	11	13
7	(Vietnam) Nguyen T M	21	18	14
(South Korea) Shon W-h	12	21	21
3	(China) Chen L	21	21
PFQ	(Malaysia) Liew DR	17	17
(China) Wang ZM	21	19	21
(England) R Ouseph	16	21	17

Quarterfinals
1	(Malaysia) Lee C W	21	21
(South Korea) Shon W-h	11	11
3	(China) Chen L	w	/	o
(China) Wang ZM

Semifinals
1	(Malaysia) Lee C W	23	17	21
3	(China) Chen L	21	21	15

=== Bottom half ===
First Round
(Hong Kong) Wong W K	19	14
(Japan) K Tago	21	21
(Spain) P Abian	18	15
8	(China) Du PY	21	21
(Poland) P Wacha	19	13
(Hong Kong) Hu Y	21	21
(Japan) S Sasaki	18	19
4	(Denmark) P Gade	21	21
Q4	(India) Gurusaidutt R. M. V.	21	9	10
(India) A Jayaram	18	21	21
(Japan) K Yamada	11	18
6	(China) Chen J	21	21
Q1	(Ukraine) D Zavadsky	18	15
Q2	(Denmark) J Persson	21	21
(South Korea) Lee H-i	17	21
2	(China) Lin D	21	23

Second Round
(Japan) K Tago	9	21	21
8	(China) Du PY	21	18	10
(Hong Kong) Hu Y	21	19	21
4	(Denmark) P Gade	19	21	17
(India) A Jayaram	19	14
6	(China) Chen J	21	21
Q2	(Denmark) J Persson	9	11
2	(China) Lin D	21	21

Quarterfinals
(Japan) K Tago	13	21	21
(Hong Kong) Hu Y	21	18	17
6	(China) Chen J	21	19	16
2	(China) Lin D	11	21	21

Semifinals
(Japan) K Tago	21	15
2	(China) Lin D	23	18^{r}

=== Finals ===
Semifinals
1	(Malaysia) Lee Chong Wei	23	17	21
3	(China) Chen Long	21	21	15
(Japan) Kenichi Tago	21	15
2	(China) Lin Dan	23	18^{r}

Final
1	(Malaysia) Lee Chong Wei	21	21
(Japan) Kenichi Tago	15	11

== Women's singles ==
=== Seeds ===
1. (China) Wang Yihan
2. (China) Wang Shixian
3. (China) Wang Xin
4. (India) Saina Nehwal
5. (China) Jiang Yanjiao
6. (Germany) Juliane Schenk
7. (China) Liu Xin
8. (Denmark) Tine Baun

=== Top half ===
First Round
1	(China) Wang YH	1
(Scotland) S Egelstaff	0^{r}
PFQ	(Russia) A Prokopenko	19	20
(Singapore) Gu J	21	22
8	(Denmark) T Baun	21	19	19
(Chinese Taipei) Tai T-y	15	21	21
(Hong Kong) Yip P Y	21	23
(Thailand) R Inthanon	12	21
4	(India) S Nehwal	21	21
(Netherlands) Yao J	14	9
(China) Li XR	21	21
(South Korea) Bae Y-j	16	13
7	(China) Liu X	6^{r}
(Japan) S Sato	6
(Thailand) S Ponsana	12	9
(Japan) A Goto	21	21

Second Round
1	(China) Wang YH	21	21
(Singapore) Gu J	8	10
(Chinese Taipei) Tai T-y	21	21
(Hong Kong) Yip P Y	19	16
4	(India) S Nehwal	18	29
(China) Li XR	21	30
(Japan) S Sato	21	16	21
(Japan) A Goto	18	21	15

Quarterfinals
1	(China) Wang YH	18	13
(Chinese Taipei) Tai T-y	21	21
(China) Li XR	21	21
(Japan) S Sato	15	13

Semifinals
(Chinese Taipei) Tai T-y	8	19
(China) Li XR	21	21

=== Bottom half ===
First Round
Q4	(France) S Vignes Waran	23	17	10
Q2	(Chinese Taipei) Pai H-m	21	21	21
PFQ	(Canada) M Li	17	10
6	(Germany) J Schenk	21	21
(Bulgaria) P Nedelcheva	21	21
Q1	(England) E Cann	11	13
PFQ	(Bulgaria) L Zechiri	6	9
3	(China) Wang X	21	21
(Thailand) P Buranaprasertsuk	22	21
(Japan) E Hirose	20	16
(Singapore) Fu MT	11
5	(China) Jiang YJ	5^{r}
Q3	(Thailand) S Taerattanachai	23	12	11
(Chinese Taipei) Cheng S-c	21	21	21
(South Korea) Sung J-h	9	23	21
2	(China) Wang SX	21	21	19

Second Round
Q2	(Chinese Taipei) Pai H-m	11	11
6	(Germany) J Schenk	21	21
(Bulgaria) P Nedelcheva	19	11
3	(China) Wang X	21	21
(Thailand) P Buranaprasertsuk	23	21
(Singapore) Fu MT	21	15
(Chinese Taipei) Cheng S-c	17	17
(South Korea) Sung J-h	21	21

Quarterfinals
6	(Germany) J Schenk	11	15
3	(China) Wang X	21	21
(Thailand) P Buranaprasertsuk	21	13	21
(South Korea) Sung J-h	15	21	18

Semifinals
3	(China) Wang X	15	21	21
(Thailand) P Buranaprasertsuk	21	4	7

=== Finals ===
Semifinals
(Chinese Taipei) Tai Tzu-ying	8	19
(China) Li Xuerui	21	21
3	(China) Wang Xin	15	21	21
(Thailand) Porntip Buranaprasertsuk	21	4	7

Final
(China) Li Xuerui	15	19
3	(China) Wang Xin	21	21

== Men's doubles ==
=== Seeds ===
1. (China) Cai Yun / Fu Haifeng
2. (South Korea) Jung Jae-sung / Lee Yong-dae
3. (Denmark) Mathias Boe / Carsten Mogensen
4. (South Korea) Ko Sung-hyun / Yoo Yeon-seong
5. (Malaysia) Koo Kien Keat / Tan Boon Heong
6. (Indonesia) Mohammad Ahsan / Bona Septano
7. (Indonesia) Markis Kido / Hendra Setiawan
8. (China) Chai Biao / Guo Zhendong

=== Top half ===
First Round
1	(China) Cai Y (China) Fu HF	21	19	21
(South Korea) Cho G-w (South Korea) Kwon Y-g	17	21	19
(Japan) N Kawamae (Japan) S Sato	15	28	16
Q3	(Malaysia) Goh W S (Malaysia) Lim K W	21	26	21
6	(Indonesia) M Ahsan (Indonesia) B Septano	21	21
(China) Liu XL (China) Qiu ZH	18	17
(Chinese Taipei) Fang C-m (Chinese Taipei) Lee S-m	21	21
Q2	(Thailand) B Isara (Thailand) M Jongjit	14	19
4	(South Korea) Ko S-h (South Korea) Yoo Y-s	21	14	16
(China) Hong W (China) Shen Y	13	21	21
(Japan) H Hashimoto (Japan) N Hirata	21	21
Q4	(Russia) V Durkin (Russia) A Nikolaenko	16	10
7	(Indonesia) M Kido (Indonesia) H Setiawan	21	19	21
(Poland) A Cwalina (Poland) M Logosz	10	21	13
(England) C Adcock (England) A Ellis	11	21	21
(Netherlands) R Bosch (Netherlands) K Ridder	21	14	17

Second Round
1	(China) Cai Y (China) Fu HF	21	21
Q3	(Malaysia) Goh W S (Malaysia) Lim K W	19	16
6	(Indonesia) M Ahsan (Indonesia) B Septano	22	13	21
(Chinese Taipei) Fang C-m (Chinese Taipei) Lee S-m	20	21	16
(China) Hong W (China) Shen Y	20	15
(Japan) H Hashimoto (Japan) N Hirata	22	21
7	(Indonesia) M Kido (Indonesia) H Setiawan	17	19
(England) C Adcock (England) A Ellis	21	21

Quarterfinals
1	(China) Cai Y (China) Fu HF	21	21
6	(Indonesia) M Ahsan (Indonesia) B Septano	12	12
(Japan) H Hashimoto (Japan) N Hirata	16	21	21
(England) C Adcock (England) A Ellis	21	19	10

Semifinals
1	(China) Cai Y (China) Fu HF	21	13	21
(Japan) H Hashimoto (Japan) N Hirata	11	21	9

=== Bottom half ===
First Round
(Denmark) M Conrad-Petersen (Denmark) J Rasmussen	21	21
(Chinese Taipei) Chen H-l (Chinese Taipei) Lin Y-l	17	19
(Russia) V Ivanov (Russia) I Sozonov	23	17	21
5	(Malaysia) Koo K K (Malaysia) Tan B H	21	21	23
(South Korea) Kim K-j (South Korea) Shin B-c	21	24
PMD	(Germany) M Fuchs (Germany) O Roth	15	22
(Indonesia) A Y Chandra (Indonesia) H A Gunawan	22	6
3	(Denmark) M Boe (Denmark) C Mogensen	24	21
(India) R Kumar (India) S Thomas	21	12	13
(Indonesia) A Pratama (Indonesia) R A Saputro	15	21	21
(Japan) H Endo (Japan) K Hayakawa	21	21
8	(China) Chai B (China) Guo ZD	14	18
(Japan) Y Hirobe (Japan) K Kazuno	21	21
Q1	(France) B Careme (France) S Grosjean	13	12
(Malaysia) Gan T C (Malaysia) Tan B S	14	9
2	(South Korea) Jung J-s (South Korea) Lee Y-d	21	21

Second Round
(Denmark) M Conrad-Petersen (Denmark) J Rasmussen	21	21
5	(Malaysia) Koo K K (Malaysia) Tan B H	16	19
(South Korea) Kim K-j (South Korea) Shin B-c
3	(Denmark) M Boe (Denmark) C Mogensen	w	/	o
(Indonesia) A Pratama (Indonesia) R A Saputro	21	18	21
(Japan) H Endo (Japan) K Hayakawa	17	21	15
(Japan) Y Hirobe (Japan) K Kazuno	14	16
2	(South Korea) Jung J-s (South Korea) Lee Y-d	21	21

Quarterfinals
(Denmark) M Conrad-Petersen (Denmark) J Rasmussen	23	14	19
3	(Denmark) M Boe (Denmark) C Mogensen	21	21	21
(Indonesia) A Pratama (Indonesia) R A Saputro	16	12
2	(South Korea) Jung J-s (South Korea) Lee Y-d	21	21

Semifinals
3	(Denmark) M Boe (Denmark) C Mogensen	17	17
2	(South Korea) Jung J-s (South Korea) Lee Y-d	21	21

=== Finals ===
Semifinals
1	(China) Cai Yun (China) Fu Haifeng	21	13	21
(Japan) Hirokatsu Hashimoto (Japan) Noriyasu Hirata	11	21	9
3	(Denmark) Mathias Boe (Denmark) Carsten Mogensen	17	17
2	(South Korea) Jung Jae-sung (South Korea) Lee Yong-dae	21	21

Final
1	(China) Cai Yun (China) Fu Haifeng	21	15	11
2	(South Korea) Jung Jae-sung (South Korea) Lee Yong-dae	14	21	21

== Women's doubles ==
=== Seeds ===
1. (China) Wang Xiaoli / Yu Yang
2. (China) Tian Qing / Zhao Yunlei
3. (Japan) Mizuki Fujii / Reika Kakiiwa
4. (Japan) Miyuki Maeda / Satoko Suetsuna
5. (Chinese Taipei) Cheng Wen-hsing / Chien Yu-chin
6. (South Korea) Ha Jung-eun / Kim Min-jung
7. (Japan) Shizuka Matsuo / Mami Naito
8. (Indonesia) Meiliana Jauhari / Greysia Polii

=== Top half ===
First Round
1	(China) Wang XL (China) Yu Y	24	21
(Malaysia) Chin E H (Malaysia) Wong P T	22	8
(Germany) S Marinello (Germany) B Michels	22	21
(Canada) A Bruce (Canada) M Li	20	18
5	(Chinese Taipei) Cheng W-h (Chinese Taipei) Chien Y-c	20	21
(Singapore) S Mulia Sari (Singapore) Yao L	22	23
(Indonesia) V Marissa (Indonesia) N Melati	21	21
(Thailand) D Aroonkesorn (Thailand) K Voravichitchaikul	14	17
3	(Japan) M Fujii (Japan) R Kakiiwa	21	21
(Denmark) M Helsbol (Denmark) A Skelbæk	11	18
(England) M Agathangelou (England) H Olver	21	25	23
(Canada) N Grether (Canada) C Reid	23	23	21
8	(Indonesia) M Jauhari (Indonesia) G Polii	21	16	15
(Malaysia) V Hoo (Malaysia) Woon K W	18	21	21
(Indonesia) A F Agustin (Indonesia) N K Maheswari	21	21
(Denmark) L Damkæjr Kruse (Denmark) M Rœpke	16	13

Second Round
1	(China) Wang XL (China) Yu Y	21	21
(Germany) S Marinello (Germany) B Michels	12	11
(Singapore) S Mulia Sari (Singapore) Yao L	17	21	18
(Indonesia) V Marissa (Indonesia) N Melati	21	18	21
3	(Japan) M Fujii (Japan) R Kakiiwa	21	21
(England) M Agathangelou (England) H Olver	14	13
(Malaysia) V Hoo (Malaysia) Woon K W	9	23
(Indonesia) A F Agustin (Indonesia) N K Maheswari	21	25

Quarterfinals
1	(China) Wang XL (China) Yu Y	21	21
(Indonesia) V Marissa (Indonesia) N Melati	9	7
3	(Japan) M Fujii (Japan) R Kakiiwa	21	21
(Indonesia) A F Agustin (Indonesia) N K Maheswari	9	13

Semifinals
1	(China) Wang XL (China) Yu Y	21	22
3	(Japan) M Fujii (Japan) R Kakiiwa	8	20

=== Bottom half ===
First Round
(South Korea) Jung K-e (South Korea) Kim H-n	17	21	14
(India) J Gutta (India) A Ponnappa	21	8	21
(Hong Kong) Poon L Y (Hong Kong) Tse Y S	13	11
6	(South Korea) Ha J-e (South Korea) Kim M-j	21	21
Q2	(Thailand) S Amitrapai (Thailand) S Taerattanachai	9	16
(Denmark) C Pedersen (Denmark) K Rytter Juhl	21	21
(Netherlands) L Jonathans (Netherlands) P van Dooremalen	6	15
4	(Japan) M Maeda (Japan) S Suetsuna	21	21
Q4	(Chinese Taipei) Hsieh P-c (Chinese Taipei) Wang P-r	14	17
(Russia) V Sorokina (Russia) N Vislova	21	21
Q1	(Spain) M. Jolly Lee (France) S Saiche	8	5
7	(Japan) S Matsuo (Japan) M Naito	21	21
(China) Cheng S (China) Pan P	21	17	21
Q3	(South Korea) Eom H-w (South Korea) Jang Y-n	18	21	18
(Japan) M Matsutomo (Japan) A Takahashi	12	21	13
2	(China) Tian Q (China) Zhao YL	21	19	21

Second Round
(India) J Gutta (India) A Ponnappa	13	12
6	(South Korea) Ha J-e (South Korea) Kim M-j	21	21
(Denmark) C Pedersen (Denmark) K Rytter Juhl	20	3^{r}
4	(Japan) M Maeda (Japan) S Suetsuna	22	5
(Russia) V Sorokina (Russia) N Vislova	17	12
7	(Japan) S Matsuo (Japan) M Naito	21	21
(China) Cheng S (China) Pan P
2	(China) Tian Q (China) Zhao YL	w	/	o

Quarterfinals
6	(South Korea) Ha J-e (South Korea) Kim M-j	21	21
4	(Japan) M Maeda (Japan) S Suetsuna	16	16
7	(Japan) S Matsuo (Japan) M Naito	16	14
2	(China) Tian Q (China) Zhao YL	21	21

Semifinals
6	(South Korea) Ha J-e (South Korea) Kim M-j
2	(China) Tian Q (China) Zhao YL	w	/	o

=== Finals ===
Semifinals
1	(China) Wang Xiaoli (China) Yu Yang	21	22
3	(Japan) Mizuki Fujii (Japan) Reika Kakiiwa	8	20
6	(South Korea) Ha Jung-eun (South Korea) Kim Min-jung
2	(China) Tian Qing (China) Zhao Yunlei	w	/	o

Final
1	(China) Wang Xiaoli (China) Yu Yang	26	21
2	(China) Tian Qing (China) Zhao Yunlei	24	15

== Mixed doubles ==
=== Seeds ===
1. (China) Zhang Nan (badminton) / Zhao Yunlei
2. (China) Xu Chen / Ma Jin
3. (Indonesia) Tontowi Ahmad / Liliyana Natsir
4. (Denmark) Joachim Fischer Nielsen / Christinna Pedersen
5. (Thailand) Sudket Prapakamol / Saralee Thungthongkam
6. (Chinese Taipei) Chen Hung-ling / Cheng Wen-hsing
7. (Thailand) Songphon Anugritayawon / Kunchala Voravichitchaikul
8. (Germany) Michael Fuchs / Birgit Michels

=== Top half ===
First Round
1	(China) Zhang N (China) Zhao YL	21	19	21
(Chinese Taipei) Lee S-m (Chinese Taipei) Chien Y-c	13	21	15
Q2	(South Korea) Ko S-h (South Korea) Eom H-w	16	26	21
(England) N Robertson (England) J Wallwork	21	24	16
7	(Thailand) S Anugritayawon (Thailand) K Voravichitchaikul	15	19
(Scotland) R Blair (England) G White	21	21
(Russia) A Nikolaenko (Russia) V Sorokina	21	11	15
(South Korea) Yoo Y-s (South Korea) Jang Y-n	19	21	21
4	(Denmark) J Fischer Nielsen (Denmark) C Pedersen	24	21
(Singapore) C Triyachart (Singapore) Yao L	22	14
(Indonesia) F Kurniawan (Indonesia) P Z Bernadet	17	19
(Thailand) M Jongjit (Thailand) S Amitrapai	21	21
5	(Thailand) S Prapakamol (Thailand) S Thungthongkam	21	14	21
Q1	(South Korea) Shin B-c (South Korea) Kim H-n	14	21	14
(South Korea) Lee Y-d (South Korea) Ha J-e	21	21
(Denmark) M Pieder Kolding (Denmark) J Houmann	15	12

Second Round
1	(China) Zhang N (China) Zhao YL	21	11	21
Q2	(South Korea) Ko S-h (South Korea) Eom H-w	17	21	11
(Scotland) R Blair (England) G White	15	19
(South Korea) Yoo Y-s (South Korea) Jang Y-n	21	21
4	(Denmark) J Fischer Nielsen (Denmark) C Pedersen	21	21
(Thailand) M Jongjit (Thailand) S Amitrapai	17	12
5	(Thailand) S Prapakamol (Thailand) S Thungthongkam	18	22	16
(South Korea) Lee Y-d (South Korea) Ha J-e	21	20	21

Quarterfinals
1	(China) Zhang N (China) Zhao YL	21	21
(South Korea) Yoo Y-s (South Korea) Jang Y-n	17	18
4	(Denmark) J Fischer Nielsen (Denmark) C Pedersen	21	16	21
(South Korea) Lee Y-d (South Korea) Ha J-e	14	21	17

Semifinals
1	(China) Zhang N (China) Zhao YL	14	24	20
4	(Denmark) J Fischer Nielsen (Denmark) C Pedersen	21	22	22

=== Bottom half ===
First Round
(Japan) S Sato (Japan) S Matsuo	19	15
(Malaysia) Chan P S (Malaysia) Goh L Y	21	21
(Indonesia) M Rijal (Indonesia) D Susanto	19	20
6	(Chinese Taipei) Chen H-l (Chinese Taipei) Cheng W-h	21	22
(Japan) S Ikeda (Japan) R Shiota	21	21
(Hong Kong) Wong W H (Hong Kong) Chau H W	18	18
(India) Diju V. (India) J Gutta	16	8
3	(Indonesia) T Ahmad (Indonesia) L Natsir	21	21
(Indonesia) N Widianto (Indonesia) V Marissa	21	13	21
(Denmark) T Laybourn (Denmark) K Rytter Juhl	16	21	15
Q3	(South Korea) Kim K-j (South Korea) Jung K-e	21	20	21
8	(Germany) M Fuchs (Germany) B Michels	11	22	19
Q4	(Chinese Taipei) Fang C-m (Chinese Taipei) Wang P-r	22	18
(England) C Adcock (Scotland) I Bankier	24	21
PFQ	(Japan) H Hashimoto (Japan) M Fujii	11	10
2	(China) Xu C (China) Ma J	21	21

Second Round
(Malaysia) Chan P S (Malaysia) Goh L Y	19	21	16
6	(Chinese Taipei) Chen H-l (Chinese Taipei) Cheng W-h	21	11	21
(Japan) S Ikeda (Japan) R Shiota	14	17
3	(Indonesia) T Ahmad (Indonesia) L Natsir	21	21
(Indonesia) N Widianto (Indonesia) V Marissa	26	21
Q3	(South Korea) Kim K-j (South Korea) Jung K-e	24	14
(England) C Adcock (Scotland) I Bankier	21	19
2	(China) Xu C (China) Ma J	23	21

Quarterfinals
6	(Chinese Taipei) Chen H-l (Chinese Taipei) Cheng W-h	9	14
3	(Indonesia) T Ahmad (Indonesia) L Natsir	21	21
(Indonesia) N Widianto (Indonesia) V Marissa	21	19	11
2	(China) Xu C (China) Ma J	18	21	21

Semifinals
3	(Indonesia) T Ahmad (Indonesia) L Natsir	21	14	11
2	(China) Xu C (China) Ma J	16	21	21

=== Finals ===
Semifinals
1	(China) Zhang Nan (China) Zhao Yunlei	14	24	20
4	(Denmark) Joachim Fischer Nielsen (Denmark) Christinna Pedersen	21	22	22
3	(Indonesia) Tontowi Ahmad (Indonesia) Liliyana Natsir	21	14	11
2	(China) Xu Chen (China) Ma Jin	16	21	21

Final
4	(Denmark) Joachim Fischer Nielsen (Denmark) Christinna Pedersen	21	21
2	(China) Xu Chen (China) Ma Jin	17	14

Preceded by 2010 French Super Series	French Super Series	Succeeded by 2012 French Super Series
Preceded by 2011 Denmark Super Series Premier	2011 BWF Super Series	Succeeded by 2011 Hong Kong Super Series
