= Ma Jin =

Chinese badminton player (born 1988)

Ma Jin 马晋
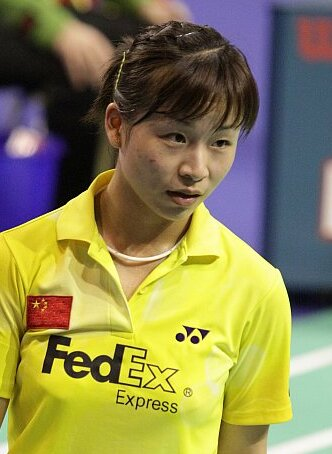
- Ma in 2009

Personal information
- Born: 7 May 1988 (age 38) Nantong, Jiangsu, China
- Height: 1.65 m (5 ft 5 in)
- Weight: 55 kg (121 lb)

Sport
- Country: China
- Sport: Badminton
- Handedness: Right

Women's & mixed doubles
- Highest ranking: 1 (WD with Wang Xiaoli, 26 November 2009); 1 (XD with Zheng Bo, 21 January 2010); 1 (XD with Xu Chen, 16 August 2012)
- BWF profile
Medal record
Women's badminton
Representing China
Olympic Games
Silver medal – second place	2012 London	Mixed doubles
World Championships
Gold medal – first place	2010 Paris	Mixed doubles
Silver medal – second place	2010 Paris	Women's doubles
Silver medal – second place	2013 Guangzhou	Mixed doubles
Silver medal – second place	2014 Copenhagen	Mixed doubles
Bronze medal – third place	2009 Hyderabad	Women's doubles
Bronze medal – third place	2011 London	Mixed doubles
Bronze medal – third place	2015 Jakarta	Mixed doubles
Sudirman Cup
Gold medal – first place	2009 Guangzhou	Mixed team
Gold medal – first place	2011 Qingdao	Mixed team
Gold medal – first place	2013 Kuala Lumpur	Mixed team
Gold medal – first place	2015 Donggun	Mixed team
Uber Cup
Gold medal – first place	2014 New Delhi	Women's team
Silver medal – second place	2010 Kuala Lumpur	Women's team
Asian Games
Gold medal – first place	2010 Guangzhou	Women's team
Gold medal – first place	2014 Incheon	Women's team
Bronze medal – third place	2010 Guangzhou	Mixed doubles
Bronze medal – third place	2014 Incheon	Mixed doubles
Asian Championships
Gold medal – first place	2009 Suwon	Women's doubles
Gold medal – first place	2015 Wuhan	Women's doubles
Silver medal – second place	2011 Chengdu	Mixed doubles
Silver medal – second place	2012 Qingdao	Mixed doubles
Silver medal – second place	2013 Taipei	Women's doubles
Bronze medal – third place	2009 Suwon	Mixed doubles
Bronze medal – third place	2015 Wuhan	Mixed doubles
East Asian Games
Gold medal – first place	2009 Hong Kong	Women's team
Gold medal – first place	2013 Tianjin	Mixed doubles
Gold medal – first place	2013 Tianjin	Women's team
Silver medal – second place	2009 Hong Kong	Women's doubles
Silver medal – second place	2009 Hong Kong	Mixed doubles
World Junior Championships
Gold medal – first place	2006 Incheon	Girls' doubles
Silver medal – second place	2006 Incheon	Mixed doubles
Silver medal – second place	2006 Incheon	Mixed team
Asian Junior Championships
Gold medal – first place	2005 Jakarta	Girls' team
Gold medal – first place	2006 Kuala Lumpur	Girls' doubles
Bronze medal – third place	2006 Kuala Lumpur	Mixed team

Ma Jin (simplified Chinese: 马晋; traditional Chinese: 馬晉; pinyin: Mǎ Jìn; born 7 May 1988) is a badminton player from China who specialises in women's and mixed doubles. She partnered Wang Xiaoli in women's doubles and excelled in the category until 2010 when both players are split after China failed to defend their Uber Cup against South Korea in Kuala Lumpur. Consequently, Ma Jin was unable to continue competing in the women's doubles event without her regular partner and she had to concentrate on mixed doubles instead. Ma Jin had tasted successes in mixed with several partners, notably Zheng Bo, He Hanbin and Xu Chen. Her domination at the front of the court combined with the power play from Xu Chen made them one of the most dominant Chinese pairs to date, the other being Zhang Nan and Zhao Yunlei.

Her career success includes an Olympic silver medal in mixed doubles with Xu Chen at the London 2012 Olympics and a World Championship title which she won with a different partner, Zheng Bo in 2010 at Paris.

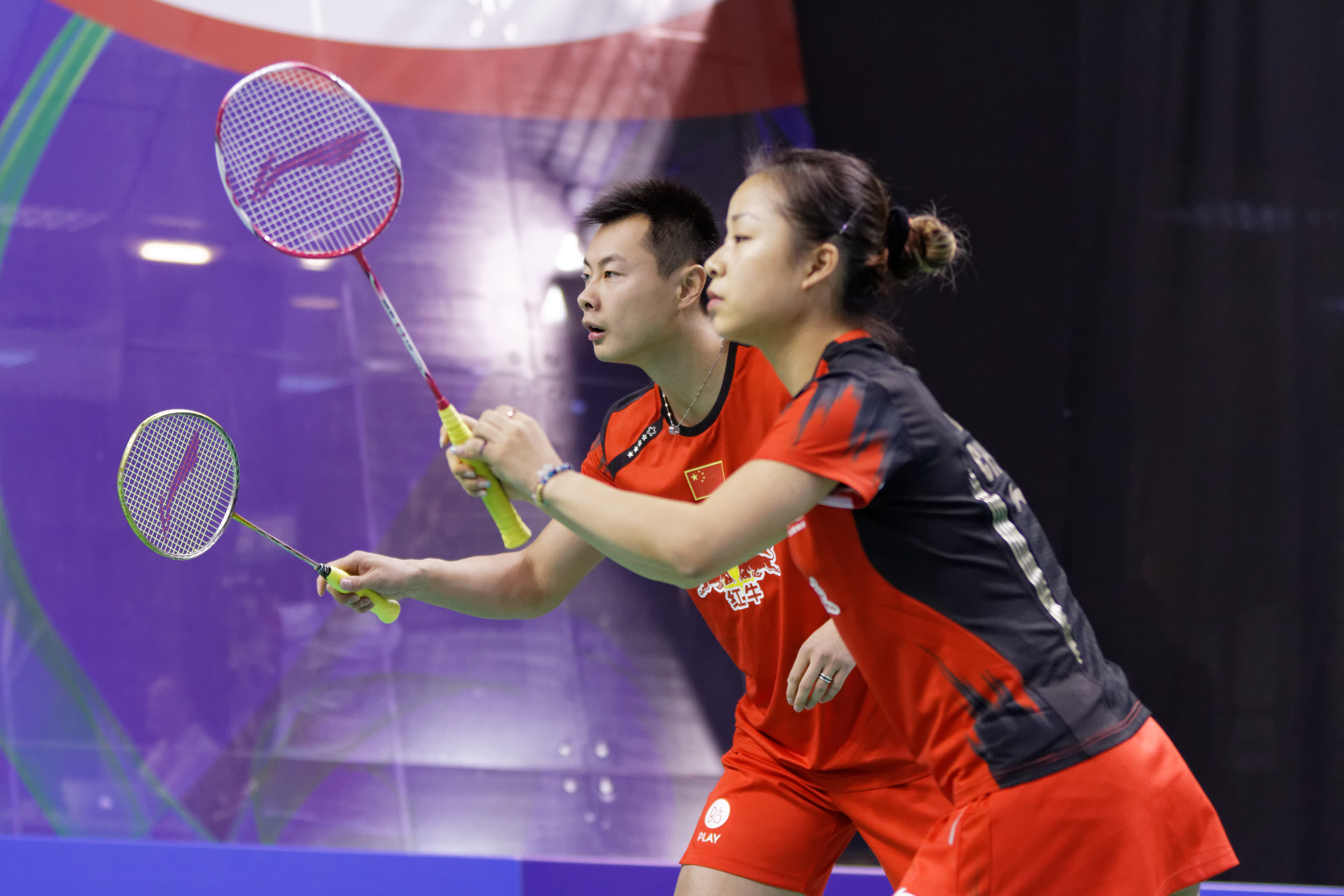
Ma and Xu Chen at the 2013 French Super Series

== Achievements ==
=== Olympic Games ===
Mixed doubles
Year	Venue	Partner	Opponent	Score	Result
2012	Wembley Arena, London, Great Britain	(China) Xu Chen	(China) Zhang Nan (China) Zhao Yunlei	11–21, 17–21	Silver

=== BWF World Championships ===
Women's doubles
Year	Venue	Partner	Opponent	Score	Result
2009	Gachibowli Indoor Stadium, Hyderabad, India	(China) Wang Xiaoli	(China) Cheng Shu (China) Zhao Yunlei	16–21, 12–21	Bronze
2010	Stade Pierre de Coubertin, Paris, France	(China) Wang Xiaoli	(China) Du Jing (China) Yu Yang	9–21, 17–21	Silver

Mixed doubles
Year	Venue	Partner	Opponent	Score	Result
2010	Stade Pierre de Coubertin, Paris, France	(China) Zheng Bo	(China) He Hanbin (China) Yu Yang	21–14, 21–10	Gold
2011	Wembley Arena, London, England	(China) Xu Chen	(China) Zhang Nan (China) Zhao Yunlei	17–21, retired	Bronze
2013	Tianhe Sports Center, Guangzhou, China	(China) Xu Chen	(Indonesia) Tontowi Ahmad (Indonesia) Liliyana Natsir	13-21, 21-16, 20-22	Silver
2014	Ballerup Super Arena, Copenhagen, Denmark	(China) Xu Chen	(China) Zhang Nan (China) Zhao Yunlei	12–21, 23–21, 13–21	Silver
2015	Istora Senayan, Jakarta, Indonesia	(China) Xu Chen	(China) Liu Cheng (China) Bao Yixin	13–21, 21–15, 19–21	Bronze

=== Asian Games ===
Mixed doubles
Year	Venue	Partner	Opponent	Score	Result
2010	Tianhe Gymnasium, Guangzhou, China	(China) He Hanbin	(South Korea) Shin Baek-cheol (South Korea) Lee Hyo-jung	22–20, 18–21, 20–22	Bronze
2014	Gyeyang Gymnasium, Incheon, South Korea	(China) Xu Chen	(Indonesia) Tontowi Ahmad (Indonesia) Liliyana Natsir	12–21, 10–21	Bronze

=== Asian Championships ===
Women's doubles
Year	Venue	Partner	Opponent	Score	Result
2009	Suwon Indoor Stadium, Suwon, South Korea	(China) Wang Xiaoli	(South Korea) Lee Hyo-jung (South Korea) Lee Kyung-won	21–11, 21–18	Gold
2013	Taipei Arena, Taipei, Taiwan	(China) Tang Jinhua	(China) Wang Xiaoli (China) Yu Yang	15–21, 21–14, 15–21	Silver
2015	Wuhan Sports Center Gymnasium, Wuhan, China	(China) Tang Yuanting	(China) Wang Xiaoli (China) Yu Yang	21–12, 21–12	Gold

Mixed doubles
Year	Venue	Partner	Opponent	Score	Result
2009	Suwon Indoor Stadium, Suwon, South Korea	(China) Tao Jiaming	(South Korea) Lee Yong-dae (South Korea) Lee Hyo-jung	16–21, 18–21	Bronze
2011	Sichuan Gymnasium, Chengdu, China	(China) Xu Chen	(China) Zhang Nan (China) Zhao Yunlei	21–15, 15–21, 23–25	Silver
2012	Qingdao Sports Centre Conson Stadium, Qingdao, China	(China) Xu Chen	(China) Zhang Nan (China) Zhao Yunlei	13–21, 12–21	Silver
2015	Wuhan Sports Center Gymnasium, Wuhan, China	(China) Xu Chen	(Indonesia) Tontowi Ahmad (Indonesia) Liliyana Natsir	12–21, 15–21	Bronze

=== East Asian Games ===
Women's doubles
Year	Venue	Partner	Opponent	Score	Result
2009	Queen Elizabeth Stadium, Hong Kong	(China) Wang Xiaoli	(Macau) Zhang Dan (Macau) Zhang Zhibo	20–22, 16–21	Silver

Mixed doubles
Year	Venue	Partner	Opponent	Score	Result
2009	Queen Elizabeth Stadium, Hong Kong	(China) Zhang Nan	(China) Tao Jiaming (China) Zhang Yawen	15–21, 14–21	Silver
2013	Binhai New Area Dagang Gymnasium, Tianjin, China	(China) Xu Chen	(Hong Kong) Lee Chun Hei (Hong Kong) Chau Hoi Wah	17–21, 21–13, 21–13	Gold

=== BWF World Junior Championships ===
Girls' doubles
Year	Venue	Partner	Opponent	Score	Result
2006	Samsan World Gymnasium, Incheon, South Korea	(China) Wang Xiaoli	(South Korea) Hong Soo-jung (South Korea) Sun In-jang	21–13, 21–18	Gold

Mixed doubles
Year	Venue	Partner	Opponent	Score	Result
2006	Samsan World Gymnasium, Incheon, South Korea	(China) Li Tian	(South Korea) Lee Yong-dae (South Korea) Yoo Hyun-young	21–18, 19–21, 14–21	Silver

=== Asian Junior Championships ===
Girls' doubles
Year	Venue	Partner	Opponent	Score	Result
2006	Kuala Lumpur Badminton Stadium, Kuala Lumpur, Malaysia	(China) Wang Xiaoli	(South Korea) Sun In-jang (South Korea) Yoo Hyun-young	21–19, 21–11	Gold

=== BWF Superseries ===
The BWF Superseries, which was launched on 14 December 2006 and implemented in 2007, is a series of elite badminton tournaments, sanctioned by the Badminton World Federation (BWF). BWF Superseries levels are Superseries and Superseries Premier. A season of Superseries consists of twelve tournaments around the world that have been introduced since 2011. Successful players are invited to the Superseries Finals, which are held at the end of each year.

Women's doubles
Year	Tournament	Partner	Opponent	Score	Result
2009	Japan Open	(China) Wang Xiaoli	(Japan) Miyuki Maeda (Japan) Satoko Suetsuna	21–19, 21–18	(gold) Winner
2009	French Open	(China) Wang Xiaoli	(China) Cheng Shu (China) Zhao Yunlei	21–13, 21–8	(gold) Winner
2009	Hong Kong Open	(China) Wang Xiaoli	(China) Du Jing (China) Yu Yang	16–21, 21–19, 21–12	(gold) Winner
2010	Malaysia Open	(China) Wang Xiaoli	(China) Du Jing (China) Yu Yang	16–21, 12–21	(silver) Runner-up
2010	China Open	(China) Zhong Qianxin	(China) Cheng Shu (China) Zhao Yunlei	Walkover	(silver) Runner-up
2012	Denmark Open	(China) Tang Jinhua	(Japan) Misaki Matsutomo (Japan) Ayaka Takahashi	21–8, 21–12	(gold) Winner
2012	French Open	(China) Tang Jinhua	(Denmark) Christinna Pedersen (Denmark) Kamilla Rytter Juhl	21–13, 23–21	(gold) Winner
2013	Korea Open	(China) Tang Jinhua	(China) Wang Xiaoli (China) Yu Yang	17–21, 13–21	(silver) Runner-up
2013	China Masters	(China) Tang Jinhua	(China) Wang Xiaoli (China) Yu Yang	17–21, 16–21	(silver) Runner-up
2013	Japan Open	(China) Tang Jinhua	(Denmark) Christinna Pedersen (Denmark) Kamilla Rytter Juhl	21–11, 21–14	(gold) Winner
2013	World Superseries Finals	(China) Tang Jinhua	(Denmark) Christinna Pedersen (Denmark) Kamilla Rytter Juhl	19–21, 12–21	(silver) Runner-up
2014	All England Open	(China) Tang Yuanting	(China) Wang Xiaoli (China) Yu Yang	17–21, 21–18, 21–23	(silver) Runner-up
2014	Indonesia Open	(China) Tang Yuanting	(China) Tian Qing (China) Zhao Yunlei	Walkover	(silver) Runner-up
2014	French Open	(China) Tang Yuanting	(China) Wang Xiaoli (China) Yu Yang	15–21, 9–21	(silver) Runner-up
2015	Australian Open	(China) Tang Yuanting	(China) Tang Jinhua (China) Tian Qing	21–19, 16–21, 22–20	(gold) Winner

Mixed doubles
Year	Tournament	Partner	Opponent	Score	Result
2009	Swiss Open	(China) Zheng Bo	(South Korea) Lee Yong-dae (South Korea) Lee Hyo-jung	21–16, 21–15	(gold) Winner
2009	Singapore Open	(China) Zheng Bo	(China) Xie Zhongbo (China) Zhang Yawen	19–21, 21–19, 21–11	(gold) Winner
2009	Indonesia Open	(China) Zheng Bo	(South Korea) Lee Yong-dae (South Korea) Lee Hyo-jung	21–17, 8–21, 21–16	(gold) Winner
2009	China Open	(China) Zheng Bo	(South Korea) Lee Yong-dae (South Korea) Lee Hyo-jung	18–21, 21–15, 15–21	(silver) Runner-up
2011	Malaysia Open	(China) He Hanbin	(China) Tao Jiaming (China) Tian Qing	21–13, 13–21, 21–16	(gold) Winner
2011	All England Open	(China) Xu Chen	(Thailand) Sudket Prapakamol (Thailand) Saralee Thungthongkam	21–13, 21–9	(gold) Winner
2011	China Masters	(China) Xu Chen	(South Korea) Yoo Yeon-seong (South Korea) Jang Ye-na	21–13, 21–16	(gold) Winner
2011	Denmark Open	(China) Xu Chen	(Denmark) Joachim Fischer Nielsen (Denmark) Christinna Pedersen	20–22, 16–21	(silver) Runner-up
2011	French Open	(China) Xu Chen	(Denmark) Joachim Fischer Nielsen (Denmark) Christinna Pedersen	17–21, 14–21	(silver) Runner-up
2011	World Superseries Finals	(China) Xu Chen	(China) Zhang Nan (China) Zhao Yunlei	13–21, 15–21	(silver) Runner-up
2012	Korea Open	(China) Xu Chen	(South Korea) Lee Yong-dae (South Korea) Ha Jung-eun	21–12, 19–21, 21–10	(gold) Winner
2012	Malaysia Open	(China) Xu Chen	(China) Zhang Nan (China) Zhao Yunlei	12–21, 9–21	(silver) Runner-up
2012	China Masters	(China) Xu Chen	(China) Qiu Zihan (China) Tang Jinhua	14–21, 21–11, 21–10	(gold) Winner
2012	Denmark Open	(China) Xu Chen	(Indonesia) Tontowi Ahmad (Indonesia) Liliyana Natsir	23–21, 24–26, 21–11	(gold) Winner
2012	French Open	(China) Xu Chen	(China) Qiu Zihan (China) Bao Yixin	21–17, 19–21, 21–18	(gold) Winner
2012	China Open	(China) Xu Chen	(Malaysia) Chan Peng Soon (Malaysia) Goh Liu Ying	21–15, 21–17	(gold) Winner
2012	Hong Kong Open	(China) Xu Chen	(China) Zhang Nan (China) Zhao Yunlei	17–21, 17–21	(silver) Runner-up
2013	Korea Open	(China) Xu Chen	(China) Zhang Nan (China) Zhao Yunlei	21–13, 16–21, 13–21	(silver) Runner-up
2013	Japan Open	(China) Xu Chen	(China) Zhang Nan (China) Zhao Yunlei	Walkover	(silver) Runner-up
2013	French Open	(China) Xu Chen	(China) Zhang Nan (China) Zhao Yunlei	26–28, 18–21	(silver) Runner-up
2014	Korea Open	(China) Xu Chen	(China) Zhang Nan (China) Zhao Yunlei	18–21, 18–21	(silver) Runner-up
2014	Malaysia Open	(China) Xu Chen	(Denmark) Joachim Fischer Nielsen (Denmark) Christinna Pedersen	21–11, 17–21, 21–13	(gold) Winner
2014	Indonesia Open	(China) Xu Chen	(Denmark) Joachim Fischer Nielsen (Denmark) Christinna Pedersen	21–18, 16–21, 14–21	(silver) Runner-up
2014	Denmark Open	(China) Xu Chen	(Indonesia) Tontowi Ahmad (Indonesia) Liliyana Natsir	22–20, 21–15	(gold) Winner
2014	Hong Kong Open	(China) Xu Chen	(China) Zhang Nan (China) Zhao Yunlei	14–21, 19–21	(silver) Runner-up
2015	Malaysia Open	(China) Xu Chen	(China) Zhang Nan (China) Zhao Yunlei	16–21, 14–21	(silver) Runner-up
2015	Indonesia Open	(China) Xu Chen	(China) Zhang Nan (China) Zhao Yunlei	21–17, 21–16	(gold) Winner
2016	Singapore Open	(China) Xu Chen	(South Korea) Ko Sung-hyun (South Korea) Kim Ha-na	17–21, 14–21	(silver) Runner-up
2016	Indonesia Open	(China) Xu Chen	(South Korea) Ko Sung-hyun (South Korea) Kim Ha-na	21–15, 16–21, 21–13	(gold) Winner

BWF Super Series Finals tournament
BWF Super Series Premier tournament
BWF Super Series tournament

=== BWF Grand Prix ===
The BWF Grand Prix had two levels, the BWF Grand Prix and Grand Prix Gold. It was a series of badminton tournaments sanctioned by the Badminton World Federation (BWF) which was held from 2007 to 2017.

Women's doubles
Year	Tournament	Partner	Opponent	Score	Result
2008	Macau Open	(China) Wang Xiaoli	(China) Cheng Shu (China) Zhao Yunlei	15–21, 18–21	(silver) Runner-up
2009	India Open	(China) Wang Xiaoli	(Indonesia) Vita Marissa (Indonesia) Nadya Melati	21–14, 21–13	(gold) Winner
2009	Malaysia Grand Prix Gold	(China) Wang Xiaoli	(Malaysia) Chin Eei Hui (Malaysia) Wong Pei Tty	21–9, 21–11	(gold) Winner
2010	German Open	(China) Wang Xiaoli	(China) Cheng Shu (China) Zhao Yunlei	24–22, 21–15	(gold) Winner
2010	Vietnam Open	(China) Zhong Qianxin	(China) Tang Jinhua (China) Xia Huan	21–19, 21–23, 21–13	(gold) Winner
2013	German Open	(China) Tang Jinhua	(South Korea) Jung Kyung-eun (South Korea) Kim Ha-na	21–11, 14–21, 13–21	(silver) Runner-up

Mixed doubles
Year	Tournament	Partner	Opponent	Score	Result
2009	German Open	(China) Zheng Bo	(China) Xu Chen (China) Zhao Yunlei	18–21, 21–21	(silver) Runner-up
2009	Malaysia Grand Prix Gold	(China) Zheng Bo	(China) Xu Chen (China) Zhao Yunlei	5–5 retired	(gold) Winner
2010	Vietnam Open	(China) He Hanbin	(Hong Kong) Yohan Hadikusumo Wiratama (Hong Kong) Tse Ying Suet	21–18, 21–11	(gold) Winner
2011	Indonesia Grand Prix Gold	(China) Xu Chen	(China) He Hanbin (China) Bao Yixin	19–21, 4–1 retired	(silver) Runner-up
2016	China Masters	(China) Xu Chen	(China) Zheng Siwei (China) Chen Qingchen	21–17, 21–15	(gold) Winner

BWF Grand Prix Gold tournament
BWF Grand Prix tournament
