= Tang Jinhua =

Chinese badminton player (born 1992)

Tang Jinhua 汤金华
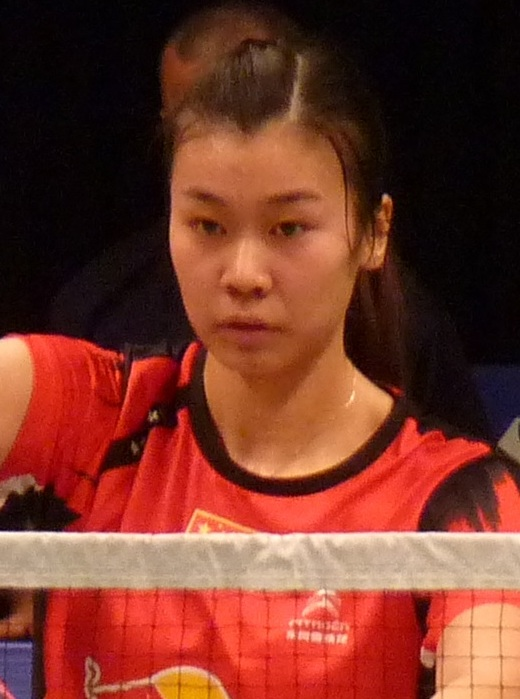
- Tang at the 2013 Dutch Open Grand Prix

Personal information
- Born: 8 January 1992 (age 34) Nanjing, Jiangsu, China
- Height: 1.70 m (5 ft 7 in)
- Weight: 65 kg (143 lb)

Sport
- Country: China
- Sport: Badminton
- Handedness: Right
- Coached by: Chen Qiqiu
- Retired: 16 May 2019

Women's & mixed doubles
- Highest ranking: 1 (WD with Bao Yixin, 29 May 2014); 30 (XD with Tao Jiaming, 11 April 2013)
- BWF profile
Medal record
Women's badminton
Representing China
Sudirman Cup
Silver medal – second place	2017 Gold Coast	Mixed team
Uber Cup
Gold medal – first place	2014 New Delhi	Women's team
Gold medal – first place	2016 Kunshan	Women's team
Bronze medal – third place	2018 Bangkok	Women's team
Asian Games
Silver medal – second place	2018 Jakarta–Palembang	Women's team
Asian Championships
Silver medal – second place	2013 Taipei	Women's doubles
World Junior Championships
Gold medal – first place	2009 Alor Setar	Girls' doubles
Gold medal – first place	2009 Alor Setar	Mixed team
Gold medal – first place	2010 Guadalajara	Mixed team
Silver medal – second place	2010 Guadalajara	Girls' doubles
Asian Junior Championships
Gold medal – first place	2009 Kuala Lumpur	Girls' doubles
Gold medal – first place	2010 Kuala Lumpur	Girls' doubles
Gold medal – first place	2010 Kuala Lumpur	Mixed team
Silver medal – second place	2009 Kuala Lumpur	Mixed team

Tang Jinhua (Chinese: 汤金华; pinyin: Tāng Jīnhuá; born 8 January 1992) is a Chinese retired badminton player who competed at the highest level of badminton tournaments during the second decade of the 2000s, winning numerous women's doubles and occasional mixed doubles events with a variety of partners. She is a graduate of Hunan University.

== Career ==
In 2009, Tang Jinhua won the World Junior girls double title with partner Xia Huan in Alor Setar, Malaysia. A year later in Guadalajara, Mexico they nearly repeated this success but fell in the finals to compatriots Bao Yixin and Ou Dongni. Tang and Xia also won girls' doubles at both the 2009 and 2010 Asian Junior Championships before graduating into elite level women's competition. In October 2010, the young partnership reached the final of the Vietnam Open Grand Prix and in December they won their first Grand Prix level title at the India Grand Prix where Tang also copped the mixed doubles title with partner Liu Peixuan.

In September 2011, Tang and Xia won their first Super Series title at the China Masters, one of a BWF tour of tournaments rated behind only the World Championships and the Olympic Games in prestige. In 2011 they also reached the semi-finals of the Grand Prix Gold level Korea Open and the finals of the Super Series Premier level China Open.

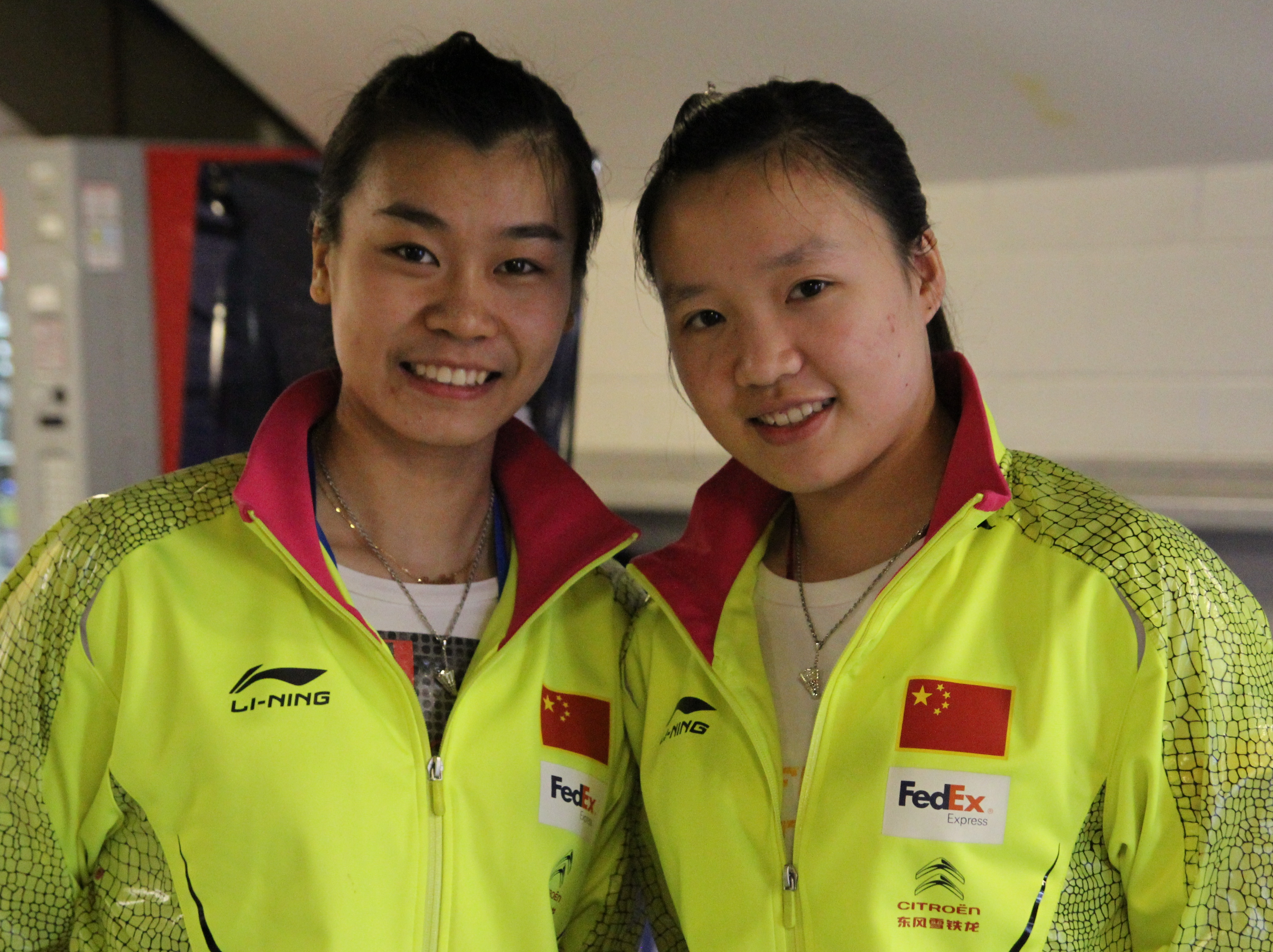
Tang (left) with Xia Huan in 2012

In 2012, Tang Jinhua and Xia Huan won the Grand Prix Gold level German Open and Swiss Open. At the prestigious Super Series Premier All England Championships they advanced to the semifinals before falling to compatriots Wang Xiaoli and Yu Yang. In June Tang and Xia were disappointed at the Thailand Open when, as tops seeds, they were upset in the semifinals by a scratch Thai pairing (who would win the event) but Tang Jinhua rebounded from this loss by winning mixed doubles at the same tournament, and from an unseeded position, with partner Tao Jiaming. In October Tang formed a new partnership with the already highly accomplished Ma Jin and they won back to back women's doubles titles at the Denmark Open Super Series Premier and the French Open Super Series.

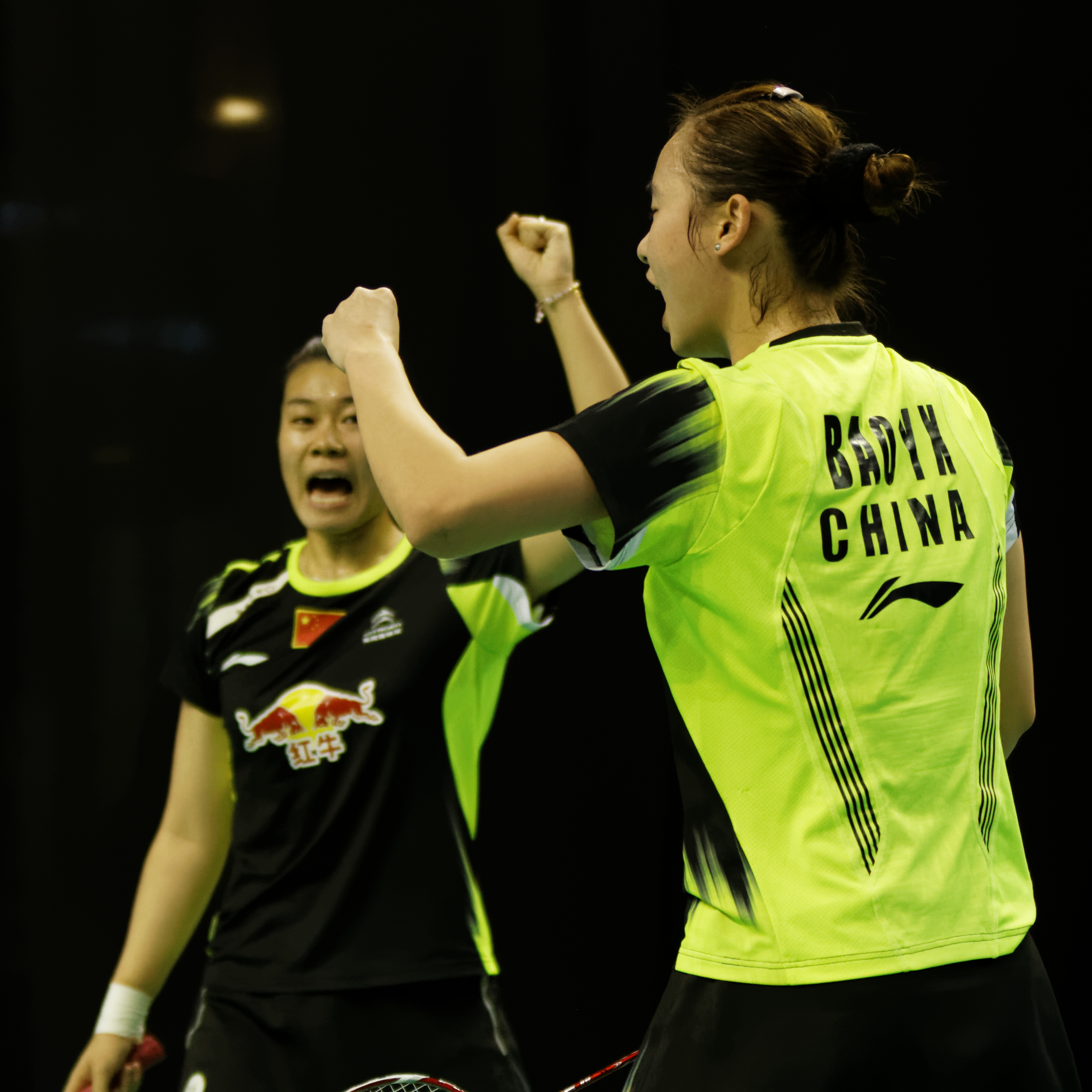
Tang (left) with Bao Yixin in 2013

Tang Jinhua's most successful years were 2013 and 2014. 2013 brought her solid if not spectacular results with Ma Jin as they finished second to Chinese compatriots at the Super Series Premier Korea Open, the China Masters Super Series, and the Badminton Asia Championships, and to a Korean pairing at the German Open, before claiming victory at the Yonex Open Japan Super Series in September. However, at the end of 2013, Tang and Ma lost the final of the Super Series Masters Finals to Danish pair Christinna Pedersen and Kamilla Rytter Juhl. Tang's results with Ma Jin, however, were completely overshadowed by her success with new partner Bao Yixin beginning in October 2013. In rapid succession the two 21-year-olds claimed titles at the Dutch Open Grand Prix, the Denmark Super Series Premier, the French Super Series, the Hong Kong Super Series and the Macao Open Grand Prix Gold, all before the end of the year. Of the first 28 matches they played the new pairing lost only once. In first four months 2014, Tang Jinhua and Bao Yixin won the Korea Open Super Series, the Malaysia Super Series Premier, the Swiss Open Grand Prix Gold and the Singapore Super Series. Tang Jinhua was also part of the Chinese Uber Cup winning team in 2014. Together with Women's Doubles partner Bao Yixin she reached the number one spot of the BWF World Ranking on 29 May 2014.

In 2015, she won the China Masters Grand Prix Gold tournament with Zhong Qianxin. For the Superseries tournament, She won the Indonesia Open with Tian Qing, and French Open with Huang Yaqiong. In 2016, she and Huang won the German Open Grand Prix Gold tournament, beat the Thai pairs Puttita Supajirakul and Sapsiree Taerattanachai.

In May 2019, she announced her retirement on her Weibo.

== Achievements ==
=== Asian Championships ===
Women's doubles
Year	Venue	Partner	Opponent	Score	Result
2013	Taipei Arena; Taipei, Taiwan	(China) Ma Jin	(China) Wang Xiaoli (China) Yu Yang	15–21, 21–14, 15–21	Silver

=== BWF World Junior Championships ===
Girls' doubles
Year	Venue	Partner	Opponent	Score	Result
2009	Stadium Sultan Abdul Halim; Alor Setar, Malaysia	(China) Xia Huan	(Indonesia) Suci Rizki Andini (Indonesia) Tiara Rosalia Nuraidah	21–9, 21–18	Gold
2010	Domo del Code Jalisco; Guadalajara, Mexico	(China) Xia Huan	(China) Bao Yixin (China) Ou Dongni	13–21, 18–21	Silver

=== Asian Junior Championships ===
Girls' doubles
Year	Venue	Partner	Opponent	Score	Result
2009	Stadium Juara; Kuala Lumpur, Malaysia	(China) Xia Huan	(China) Luo Ying (China) Luo Yu	14–21, 21–17, 21–13	Gold
2010	Stadium Juara; Kuala Lumpur, Malaysia	(China) Xia Huan	(China) Bao Yixin (China) Ou Dongni	21–17, 21–8	Gold

=== BWF World Tour ===
The BWF World Tour, which was announced on 19 March 2017 and implemented in 2018, is a series of elite badminton tournaments sanctioned by the Badminton World Federation (BWF). The BWF World Tours are divided into levels of World Tour Finals, Super 1000, Super 750, Super 500, Super 300 (part of the HSBC World Tour), and the BWF Tour Super 100.

Women's doubles
Year	Tournament	Level	Partner	Opponent	Score	Result
2018	U.S. Open	Super 300	(China) Yu Xiaohan	(South Korea) Kim Hye-jeong (South Korea) Kim So-yeong	18–21, 21–13, 21–15	(gold) Winner

=== BWF Superseries ===
The BWF Superseries, which was launched on 14 December 2006 and implemented in 2007, is a series of elite badminton tournaments, sanctioned by the Badminton World Federation (BWF). BWF Superseries levels are Superseries and Superseries Premier. A season of Superseries consists of twelve tournaments around the world that have been introduced since 2011. Successful players are invited to the Superseries Finals, which are held at the end of each year.

Women's doubles
Year	Tournament	Partner	Opponent	Score	Result
2011	China Masters	(China) Xia Huan	(China) Wang Xiaoli (China) Yu Yang	21–19 retired	(gold) Winner
2011	China Open	(China) Xia Huan	(China) Wang Xiaoli (China) Yu Yang	11-21, 10-21	(silver) Runner-up
2012	Denmark Open	(China) Ma Jin	(Japan) Misaki Matsutomo (Japan) Ayaka Takahashi	21-8, 21-12	(gold) Winner
2012	French Open	(China) Ma Jin	(Denmark) Christinna Pedersen (Denmark) Kamilla Rytter Juhl	21-12, 23-21	(gold) Winner
2013	Korea Open	(China) Ma Jin	(China) Wang Xiaoli (China) Yu Yang	17–21, 13–21	(silver) Runner-up
2013	China Masters	(China) Ma Jin	(China) Wang Xiaoli (China) Yu Yang	17–21, 16–21	(silver) Runner-up
2013	Japan Open	(China) Ma Jin	(Denmark) Christinna Pedersen (Denmark) Kamilla Rytter Juhl	21–11, 21–14	(gold) Winner
2013	Denmark Open	(China) Bao Yixin	(Denmark) Christinna Pedersen (Denmark) Kamilla Rytter Juhl	21-16, 21-13	(gold) Winner
2013	French Open	(China) Bao Yixin	(China) Tian Qing (China) Zhao Yunlei	21-13, 21-17	(gold) Winner
2013	Hong Kong Open	(China) Bao Yixin	(China) Ou Dongni (China) Tang Yuanting	18–21, 21–16, 21–15	(gold) Winner
2013	World Superseries Finals	(China) Ma Jin	(Denmark) Christinna Pedersen (Denmark) Kamilla Rytter Juhl	19–21, 12–21	(silver) Runner-up
2014	Korea Open	(China) Bao Yixin	(China) Luo Ying (China) Luo Yu	21–17, 21–15	(gold) Winner
2014	Malaysia Open	(China) Bao Yixin	(Japan) Misaki Matsutomo (Japan) Ayaka Takahashi	21–19, 14–21, 21–13	(gold) Winner
2014	Singapore Open	(China) Bao Yixin	(Denmark) Christinna Pedersen (Denmark) Kamilla Rytter Juhl	14–21, 21–19, 21–15	(gold) Winner
2015	Australian Open	(China) Tian Qing	(China) Ma Jin (China) Tang Yuanting	19–21, 21–16, 20–22	(silver) Runner-up
2015	Indonesia Open	(China) Tian Qing	(Indonesia) Nitya Krishinda Maheswari (Indonesia) Greysia Polii	21–11, 21–10	(gold) Winner
2015	French Open	(China) Huang Yaqiong	(China) Luo Ying (China) Luo Yu	21–13, 21–16	(gold) Winner
2017	Malaysia Open	(China) Huang Yaqiong	(Japan) Yuki Fukushima (Japan) Sayaka Hirota	17–21, 21–18, 12–21	(silver) Runner-up

Mixed doubles
Year	Tournament	Partner	Opponent	Score	Result
2012	China Masters	(China) Qiu Zihan	(China) Xu Chen (China) Ma Jin	21–14, 11–21, 10–21	(silver) Runner-up

BWF Super Series Finals tournament
BWF Super Series Premier tournament
BWF Super Series tournament

=== BWF Grand Prix ===
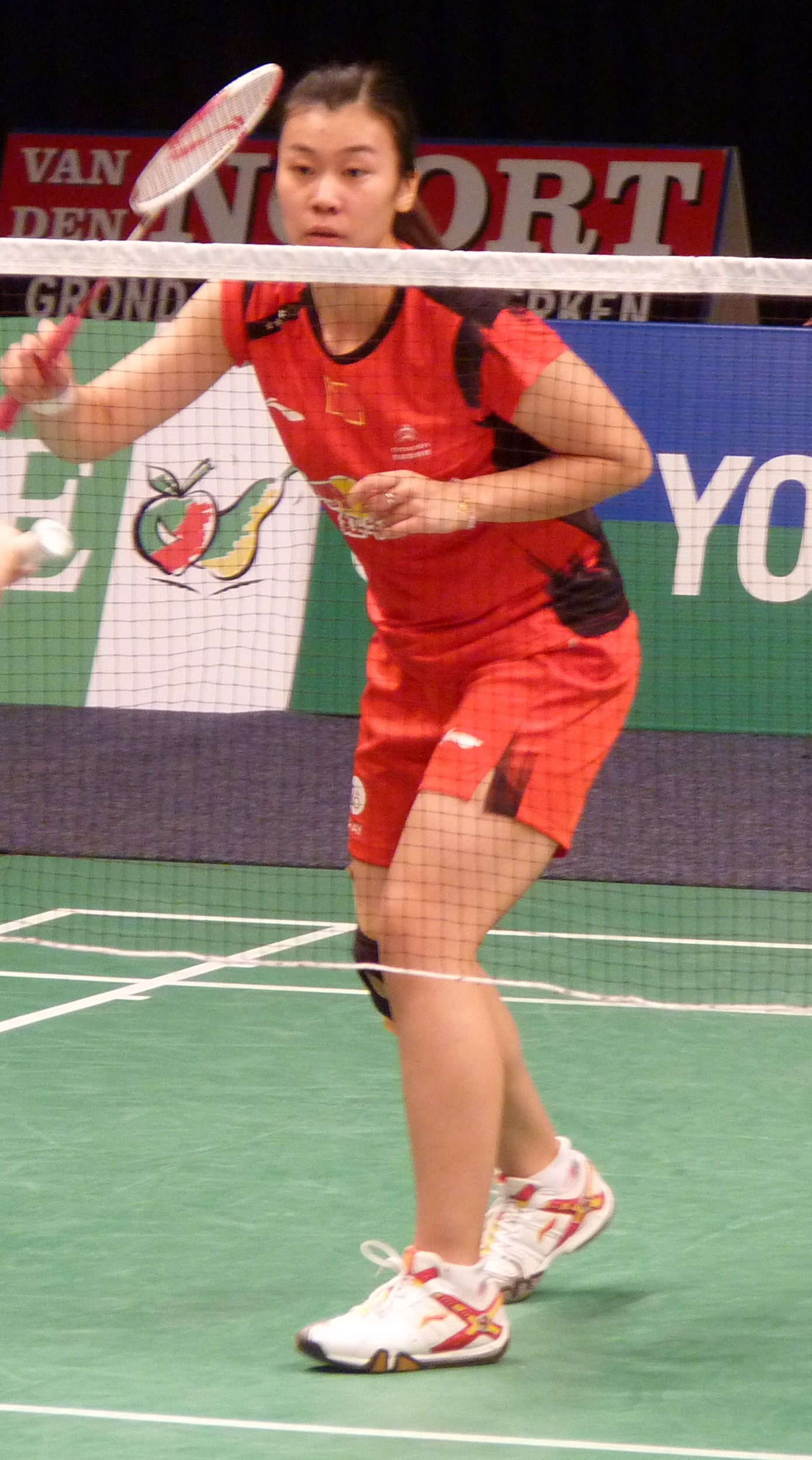
Tang at 2013 Dutch Open Grand Prix

The BWF Grand Prix had two levels, the BWF Grand Prix and Grand Prix Gold. It was a series of badminton tournaments sanctioned by the Badminton World Federation (BWF) which was held from 2007 to 2017.

Women's doubles
Year	Tournament	Partner	Opponent	Score	Result
2010	Vietnam Open	(China) Xia Huan	(China) Ma Jin (China) Zhong Qianxin	19–21, 23–21, 13–21	(silver) Runner-up
2010	India Grand Prix	(China) Xia Huan	(Malaysia) Ng Hui Ern (Malaysia) Ng Hui Lin	21–8, 21–19	(gold) Winner
2012	German Open	(China) Xia Huan	(South Korea) Jung Kyung-eun (South Korea) Kim Ha-na	23–21, 21–13	(gold) Winner
2012	Swiss Open	(China) Xia Huan	(China) Bao Yixin (China) Zhong Qianxin	21–17, 21–10	(gold) Winner
2013	German Open	(China) Ma Jin	(South Korea) Jung Kyung-eun (South Korea) Kim Ha-na	21–11, 14–21, 13–21	(silver) Runner-up
2013	Dutch Open	(China) Bao Yixin	(Indonesia) Anggia Shitta Awanda (Indonesia) Della Destiara Haris	21–15, 21–7	(gold) Winner
2013	Macau Open	(China) Bao Yixin	(China) Huang Yaqiong (China) Yu Xiaohan	21-17, 21-15	(gold) Winner
2014	Swiss Open	(China) Bao Yixin	(Indonesia) Nitya Krishinda Maheswari (Indonesia) Greysia Polii	19-21, 21-16, 21-13	(gold) Winner
2015	China Masters	(China) Zhong Qianxin	(China) Bao Yixin (China) Tang Yuanting	21–14, 11–21, 21–17	(gold) Winner
2016	German Open	(China) Huang Yaqiong	(Thailand) Puttita Supajirakul (Thailand) Sapsiree Taerattanachai	21–14, 21–18	(gold) Winner
2017	China Masters	(China) Huang Yaqiong	(China) Bao Yixin (China) Yu Xiaohan	21–8, 14–21, 17–21	(silver) Runner-up

Mixed doubles
Year	Tournament	Partner	Opponent	Score	Result
2010	India Grand Prix	(China) Liu Peixuan	(Malaysia) Gan Teik Chai (Malaysia) Ng Hui Lin	21–17, 21–17	(gold) Winner
2012	Thailand Open	(China) Tao Jiaming	(Thailand) Sudket Prapakamol (Thailand) Saralee Thungthongkam	21–14, 21–16	(gold) Winner
2013	Swiss Open	(China) Zhang Nan	(Denmark) Joachim Fischer Nielsen (Denmark) Christinna Pedersen	20–22, 19–21	(silver) Runner-up
2014	Swiss Open	(China) Chai Biao	(England) Chris Adcock (England) Gabby Adcock	17–21, 13–21	(silver) Runner-up

BWF Grand Prix Gold tournament
BWF Grand Prix tournament
