= 2011 Denmark Super Series Premier =

The 2011 Denmark Open Super Series was a top level badminton competition contested from October 18, 2011 to October 23, 2011 in Odense, Denmark. It was the ninth BWF Super Series competition on the 2011 BWF Super Series schedule. The total purse for the event was $400,000.

== Men's singles ==
=== Seeds ===
1. (Malaysia) Lee Chong Wei
2. (China) Lin Dan
3. (China) Chen Long
4. (Denmark) Peter Gade
5. (Indonesia) Taufik Hidayat
6. (China) Chen Jin
7. (Vietnam) Nguyen Tien Minh
8. (China) Du Pengyu

=== Top half ===
First Round
1	(Malaysia) Lee C W	21	21
(India) K Parupalli	11	13
(Spain) P Abian	11	12
Q1	(India) A Pawar	21	21
6	(China) Chen J	23	21
(France) Brice Leverdez	21	14
(Indonesia) T Sugiarto	21	21
(India) A Jayaram	11	16
4	(Denmark) P Gade	21	21
(China) Wang ZM	13	10
(Hong Kong) Hu Y	5	20
(Germany) M Zwiebler	21	22
5	(Indonesia) T Hidayat	18	22	21
(Denmark) H-K Vittinghus	21	20	19
(Denmark) V Axelsen	21	21
(Poland) P Wacha	15	15

Second Round
1	(Malaysia) Lee C W	21	21
Q1	(India) A Pawar	14	13
6	(China) Chen J	21	21
(Indonesia) T Sugiarto	14	16
4	(Denmark) P Gade	21	21
(Germany) Marc Zwiebler	16	16
5	(Indonesia) T Hidayat	21	9	14
(Denmark) V Axelsen	16	21	21

Quarterfinals
1	(Malaysia) Lee C W	21	21
6	(China) Chen J	14	18
4	(Denmark) P Gade	21	22	21
(Denmark) V Axelsen	15	24	12

Semifinals
1	(Malaysia) Lee C W	21	23
4	(Denmark) P Gade	19	21

=== Bottom half ===
First Round
(Denmark) J Ø Jørgensen	21	21
Q2	(Malaysia) M A A Latif	16	10
(Japan) K Yamada	14	11
8	(China) Du PY	21	21
(Indonesia) S Santoso	21	21
Q3	(Chinese Taipei) Hsueh H-y	16	5
(South Korea) Shon W-h	21	18	8
3	(China) Chen L	19	21	21
(Japan) S Sasaki	22	21
(Indonesia) D H Rumbaka	20	12
(Japan) K Tago	10	15
7	(Vietnam) Nguyen T M	21	21
(Hong Kong) Wong W K	10	21	21
(South Korea) Lee H-i	21	16	14
Q4	(England) R Ouseph	14	13
2	(China) Lin D	21	21

Second Round
(Denmark) J Ø Jørgensen	11	23	21
8	(China) Du PY	21	21	10
(Indonesia) S Santoso	21	16	8
3	(China) Chen L	18	21	21
(Japan) S Sasaki	21	15	23
7	(Vietnam) Nguyen T M	13	21	21
(Hong Kong) Wong W K	21	17	21
2	(China) Lin D	10	21	19

Quarterfinals
(Denmark) J Ø Jørgensen
3	(China) Chen L	w	/	o
(Japan) S Sasaki	15	21	21
(Hong Kong) Wong W K	21	15	7

Semifinals
3	(China) Chen L	21	21
(Japan) S Sasaki	16	7

=== Finals ===
Semifinals
1	(Malaysia) Lee Chong Wei	21	23
4	(Denmark) Peter Gade	19	21
3	(China) Chen Long	21	21
(Japan) Sho Sasaki	16	7

Final
1	(Malaysia) Lee Chong Wei	15	18
3	(China) Chen Long	21	21

== Women's singles ==
=== Seeds ===
1. (China) Wang Yihan
2. (China) Wang Shixian
3. (China) Wang Xin
4. (India) Saina Nehwal
5. (China) Jiang Yanjiao
6. (Germany) Juliane Schenk
7. (China) Liu Xin
8. (Denmark) Tine Baun

=== Top half ===
First Round
1	(China) Wang YH	21	21
(South Korea) Bae Y-j	13	6
(Japan) Eriko H	14	18
Q3	(Hong Kong) Tse Y S	21	21
5	(China) Jiang YJ	21	21
(Thailand) S Ponsana	16	11
(Japan) S Sato	21	15
(France) Pi HY	16	9^{r}
4	(India) S Nehwal	21	21
(Thailand) P Buranaprasertsuk	16	8
Q4	(Hong Kong) Chan T K	21	14	13
(Chinese Taipei) Tai T-y	18	21	21
8	(Denmark) T Baun	21	21
PFQ	(Ukraine) L Griga	13	5
(Thailand) R Inthanon	22	21
(Spain) C Marín	20	17

Second Round
1	(China) Wang YH	20	21	21
Q3	(Hong Kong) Tse Y S	22	10	7
5	(China) Jiang YJ	21	14	21
(Japan) S Sato	14	21	7
4	(India) S Nehwal	19	13
(Chinese Taipei) Tai T-y	21	21
8	(Denmark) T Baun	16	15
(Thailand) R Inthanon	21	21

Quarterfinals
1	(China) Wang YH	w	/	o
5	(China) Jiang YJ
(Chinese Taipei) Tai T-y	11	13
(Thailand) R Inthanon	21	21

Semifinals
1	(China) Wang YH	21	21
(Thailand) R Inthanon	14	6

=== Bottom half ===
First Round
(China) Li XR	21	21
Q2	(Thailand) S Taerattanachai	17	15
(Singapore) Fu MT	20	21	7
7	(China) Liu X	22	13	21
(Singapore) Gu J	17	22	21
(Bulgaria) P Nedelcheva	21	20	13
(Hong Kong) Yip P Y	20	15
3	(China) Wang X	22	21
(South Korea) Sung J-h	21	21
(Netherlands) Yao J	18	16
Q1	(Singapore) Chen JY	15	16
6	(Germany) J Schenk	21	21
(Chinese Taipei) Cheng S-c	8	15
(Japan) A Goto	21	21
PFQ	(Russia) A Prokopenko	8	15
2	(China) Wang SX	21	21

Second Round
(China) Li XR	21	18	21
7	(China) Liu X	15	21	3
(Singapore) Gu J	17	15
3	(China) Wang X	21	21
(South Korea) Sung J-h	21	21
6	(Germany) J Schenk	15	19
(Japan) A Goto	14	19
2	(China) Wang SX	21	21

Quarterfinals
(China) Li XR	13	15
3	(China) Wang X	21	21
(South Korea) Sung J-h	16	18
2	(China) Wang SX	21	21

Semifinals
3	(China) Wang X	21	21
2	(China) Wang SX	19	10

=== Finals ===
Semifinals
1	(China) Wang Yihan	21	21
(Thailand) Ratchanok Inthanon	14	6
3	(China) Wang Xin	21	21
2	(China) Wang Shixian	19	10

Final
1	(China) Wang Yihan	14	21
3	(China) Wang Xin	21	23

== Men's doubles ==
=== Seeds ===
1. (China) Cai Yun / Fu Haifeng
2. (South Korea) Jung Jae-sung / Lee Yong-dae
3. (Denmark) Mathias Boe / Carsten Mogensen
4. (South Korea) Ko Sung-hyun / Yoo Yeon-seong
5. (Malaysia) Koo Kien Keat / Tan Boon Heong
6. (Indonesia) Mohammad Ahsan / Bona Septano
7. (Indonesia) Markis Kido / Hendra Setiawan
8. (China) Chai Biao / Guo Zhendong

=== Top half ===
First Round
1	(China) Cai Y (China) Fu HF	21	21
(Japan) N Kawamae (Japan) S Sato	16	12
(Germany) M Fuchs (Germany) O Roth	17	12
(Chinese Taipei) Fang C-m (Chinese Taipei) Lee S-m	21	21
8	(China) Chai B (China) Guo ZD	21	19	11
Q4	(Malaysia) Hoon T H (Malaysia) Tan W K	16	21	21
(Indonesia) A Y Chandra (Indonesia) H A Gunawan	21	21
Q1	(Denmark) R Bonde (Denmark) A Kristiansen	12	13
3	(Denmark) M Boe (Denmark) C Mogensen	21	21
PFQ	(Thailand) S Anugritayawon (Thailand) S Prapakamol	10	8
Q2	(Malaysia) Chan P S (Malaysia) Ong J G	11	18
(Japan) H Endo (Japan) K Hayakawa	21	21
5	(Malaysia) Koo K K (Malaysia) Tan B H	21	15	12
(South Korea) Cho G-w (South Korea) Kwon Y-g	15	21	21
(Japan) H Hashimoto (Japan) N Hirata	21	21
(China) Hong W (China) Shen Y	19	18

Second Round
1	(China) Cai Y (China) Fu HF	21	21
(Chinese Taipei) Fang C-m (Chinese Taipei) Lee S-m	19	16
Q4	(Malaysia) Hoon T H (Malaysia) Tan W K	21	21
(Indonesia) A Y Chandra (Indonesia) H A Gunawan	18	17
3	(Denmark) M Boe (Denmark) C Mogensen	21	21
(Japan) H Endo (Japan) K Hayakawa	16	16
(South Korea) Cho G-w (South Korea) Kwon Y-g	21	16	21
(Japan) H Hashimoto (Japan) N Hirata	15	21	15

Quarterfinals
1	(China) Cai Y (China) Fu HF	21	21
Q4	(Malaysia) Hoon T H (Malaysia) Tan W K	11	11
3	(Denmark) M Boe (Denmark) C Mogensen	21	21
(South Korea) Cho G-w (South Korea) Kwon Y-g	12	18

Semifinals
1	(China) Cai Y (China) Fu HF	21	21
3	(Denmark) M Boe (Denmark) C Mogensen	13	18

=== Bottom half ===
First Round
(Chinese Taipei) Chen H-l (Chinese Taipei) Lin Y-l	22	21
(Malaysia) Gan T C (Malaysia) Tan B S	20	19
(Poland) A Cwalina (Poland) M Łogosz	16	20
7	(Indonesia) M Kido (Indonesia) H Setiawan	21	22
(Netherlands) R Bosch (Netherlands) K Ridder	21	21
Q3	(Malaysia) M Z Abdul Latif (Malaysia) M F Mohd Tazari	14	16
(England) C Adcock (England) A Ellis	16	21	7
4	(South Korea) Ko S-h (South Korea) Yoo Y-s	21	19	21
(Indonesia) A Pratama (Indonesia) R A Saputro	16	22
(Russia) V Ivanov (Russia) I Sozonov	21	24
(China) Liu XL (China) Qiu ZH	21	18	21
6	(Indonesia) M Ahsan (Indonesia) B Septano	15	21	17
(South Korea) Kim K-j (South Korea) Shin B-c	13	17
(Denmark) M Conrad-Petersen (Denmark) J Rasmussen	21	21
(Japan) Y Hirobe (Japan) K Kazuno	18	7
2	(South Korea) Jung J-s (South Korea) Lee Y-d	21	21

Second Round
(Chinese Taipei) Chen H-l (Chinese Taipei) Lin Y-l	19	21	20
7	(Indonesia) M Kido (Indonesia) H Setiawan	21	16	22
(Netherlands) R Bosch (Netherlands) K Ridder	15	9
4	(South Korea) Ko S-h (South Korea) Yoo Y-s	21	21
(Russia) V Ivanov (Russia) I Sozonov	9	15
(China) Liu XL (China) Qiu ZH	21	21
(Denmark) M Conrad-Petersen (Denmark) J Rasmussen	21	12	7
2	(South Korea) Jung J-s (South Korea) Lee Y-d	14	21	21

Quarterfinals
7	(Indonesia) M Kido (Indonesia) H Setiawan	15	22	21
4	(South Korea) Ko S-h (South Korea) Yoo Y-s	21	20	19
(China) Liu XL (China) Qiu ZH	20	18
2	(South Korea) Jung J-s (South Korea) Lee Y-d	22	21

Semifinals
7	(Indonesia) M Kido (Indonesia) H Setiawan	11	21	19
2	(South Korea) Jung J-s (South Korea) Lee Y-d	21	17	21

=== Finals ===
Semifinals
1	(China) Cai Yun (China) Fu Haifeng	21	21
3	(Denmark) Mathias Boe (Denmark) Carsten Mogensen	13	18
7	(Indonesia) Markis Kido (Indonesia) Hendra Setiawan	11	21	19
2	(South Korea) Jung Jae-sung (South Korea) Lee Yong-dae	21	17	21

Final
1	(China) Cai Yun (China) Fu Haifeng	16	17
2	(South Korea) Jung Jae-sung (South Korea) Lee Yong-dae	21	21

== Women's doubles ==
=== Seeds ===
1. (China) Wang Xiaoli / Yu Yang
2. (China) Tian Qing / Zhao Yunlei
3. (Japan) Mizuki Fujii / Reika Kakiiwa
4. (Japan) Miyuki Maeda / Satoko Suetsuna
5. (Chinese Taipei) Cheng Wen-hsing / Chien Yu-chin
6. (South Korea) Ha Jung-eun / Kim Min-jung
7. (Japan) Shizuka Matsuo / Mami Naito
8. (Indonesia) Meiliana Jauhari / Greysia Polii

=== Top half ===
First Round
1	(China) Wang XL (China) Yu Y	21	21
(Hong Kong) Poon L Y (Hong Kong) Tse Y S	8	12
(India) J Gutta (India) A Ponnappa	16	17
(Singapore) S M Sari (Singapore) Yao L	21	21
5	(Chinese Taipei) Cheng W-h (Chinese Taipei) Chien Y-c	19	17
(Indonesia) A F Agustin (Indonesia) N K Maheswari	21	21
(England) M Agathangelou (England) H Olver	18	21	16
(Canada) N Grether (Canada) C Reid	21	17	21
3	(Japan) M Fujii (Japan) R Kakiiwa	22	21
(Malaysia) Chin E H (Malaysia) Wong P T	20	18
(Thailand) D Aroonkesorn (Thailand) K Voravichitchaikul	21	21
(Denmark) M Helsbol (Denmark) A Skelbæk	18	18
6	(South Korea) Ha J-e (South Korea) Kim M-j	21	21
Q1	(England) J Wallwork (England) G White	6	12
Q2	(Thailand) S Amitrapai (Thailand) S Taerattanachai	21	21
(Sweden) E Lennartsson (Sweden) E Wengberg	9	13

Second Round
1	(China) Wang XL (China) Yu Y	21	21
(Singapore) S Mulia Sari (Singapore) Lei Y	8	8
(Indonesia) A F Agustin (Indonesia) N K Maheswari	21	20	21
(Canada) N Grether (Canada) C Reid	13	22	12
3	(Japan) M Fujii (Japan) R Kakiiwa	17	18
(Thailand) D Aroonkesorn (Thailand) K Voravichitchaikul	21	21
6	(South Korea) Ha J-e (South Korea) Kim M-j	21	21
Q2	(Thailand) S Amitrapai (Thailand) S Taerattanachai	14	17

Quarterfinals
1	(China) Wang XL (China) Yu Y	21	21
(Indonesia) A F Agustin (Indonesia) N K Maheswari	9	14
(Thailand) D Aroonkesorn (Thailand) K Voravichitchaikul	15	9
6	(South Korea) Ha J-e (South Korea) Kim M-j	21	21

Semifinals
1	(China) Wang XL (China) Yu Y	21	14	21
6	(South Korea) Ha J-e (South Korea) Kim M-j	8	21	16

=== Bottom half ===
First Round
(South Korea) Eom H-w (South Korea) Jang Y-n	18	18
(Denmark) L Damkjær Kruse (Denmark) Marie Røpke	21	21
(South Korea) Jung K-e (South Korea) Kim H-n	21	21
7	(Japan) S Matsuo (Japan) M Naito	18	12
(Japan) M Matsutomo (Japan) A Takahashi	21	21
(China) Cheng S (China) Pan P	19	17
(Denmark) C Pedersen (Denmark) K Rytter Juhl	21	21
4	(Japan) M Maeda (Japan) S Suetsuna	19	19
Q3	(Malaysia) Chong S C (Malaysia) Goh L Y	21	21
Q4	(Denmark) S-M Jensen (Denmark) L Kjærsfeldt	18	19
(Netherlands) L Jonathans (Netherlands) P van Dooremalen	18	21	21
8	(Indonesia) M Jauhari (Indonesia) G Polii	21	17	19
(Indonesia) V Marissa (Indonesia) N Melati	21	21
(Germany) S Marinello (Germany) B Michels	16	18
(Chinese Taipei) Hsieh P-c (Chinese Taipei) Wang P-r	13	19
2	(China) Tian Q (China) Zhao YL	21	21

Second Round
(Denmark) L Damkjær Kruse (Denmark) Marie Røpke	19	21	21
(South Korea) Jung K-e (South Korea) Kim H-n	21	17	18
(Japan) M Matsutomo (Japan) A Takahashi	21	13	21
(Denmark) C Pedersen (Denmark) K Rytter Juhl	19	21	19
Q3	(Malaysia) Chong S C (Malaysia) Goh L Y	18	14
(Netherlands) L Jonathans (Netherlands) P van Dooremalen	21	21
(Indonesia) V Marissa (Indonesia) N Melati	15	13
2	(China) Tian Q (China) Zhao YL	21	21

Quarterfinals
(Denmark) L Damkjær Kruse (Denmark) M Rœpke	21	18	21
(Japan) M Matsutomo (Japan) A Takahashi	12	21	15
(Netherlands) L Jonathans (Netherlands) P van Dooremalen	7	18
2	(China) Tian Q (China) Zhao YL	21	21

Semifinals
(Denmark) L Damkjær Kruse (Denmark) M Rœpke	12	5
2	(China) Tian Q (China) Zhao YL	21	21

=== Finals ===
Semifinals
1	(China) Wang Xiaoli (China) Yu Yang	21	14	21
6	(South Korea) Ha Jung-eun (South Korea) Kim Min-jung	8	21	16
(Denmark) Line Damkjær Kruse (Denmark) Marie Røpke	12	5
2	(China) Tian Qing (China) Zhao Yunlei	21	21

Final
1	(China) Wang Xiaoli (China) Yu Yang	22	21
2	(China) Tian Qing (China) Zhao Yunlei	20	16

== Mixed doubles ==
=== Seeds ===
1. (China) Zhang Nan / Zhao Yunlei
2. (Indonesia) Tantowi Ahmad / Lilyana Natsir
3. (Denmark) Joachim Fischer Nielsen / Christinna Pedersen
4. (Thailand) Sudket Prapakamol / Saralee Thoungthongkam
5. (China) Xu Chen / Ma Jin
6. (Chinese Taipei) Chen Hung-ling / Cheng Wen-hsing
7. (Thailand) Songphon Anugritayawon / Kunchala Voravichitchaikul
8. (Germany) Michael Fuchs / Birgit Michels

=== Top half ===
First Round
1	(China) Zhang N (China) Zhao YL	21	21
(Singapore) C Triyachart (Singapore) Yao L	12	13
(Malaysia) Chan P S (Malaysia) Goh L Y	21	21
(Hong Kong) Wong W H (Hong Kong) Chau H W	18	18
7	(Thailand) S Anugritayawon (Thailand) K Voravichitchaikul	21	21
(Indonesia) N Widianto (Indonesia) V Marissa	17	18
(Japan) H Hashimoto (Japan) M Fujii	21	13	19
(Indonesia) M Rijal (Indonesia) D Susanto	18	21	21
3	(Denmark) J Fischer Nielsen (Denmark) C Pedersen	21	21
(Japan) S Sato (Japan) S Matsuo	17	15
Q4	(South Korea) Shin B-c (South Korea) Kim H-n	21	21
(Malaysia) Ong J G (Malaysia) Chong S C	10	12
8	(Germany) M Fuchs (Germany) B Michels	21	22	21
(India) Diji V. (India) J Gutta	15	24	23
(Scotland) R Blair (England) G White	20	16
(England) C Adcock (Scotland) I Bankier	22	21

Second Round
1	(China) Zhang N (China) Zhao YL	21	21
(Malaysia) Chan P S (Malaysia) Goh L Y	16	15
7	(Thailand) S Anugritayawon (Thailand) K Voravichitchaikul	14	18
(Indonesia) M Rijal (Indonesia) D Susanto	21	21
3	(Denmark) J Fischer Nielsen (Denmark) C Pedersen	21	21
Q4	(South Korea) Shin B-c (South Korea) Kim H-n	17	15
(India) Diju V. (India) J Gutta	21	21
(England) C Adcock (Scotland) I Bankier	16	19

Quarterfinals
1	(China) Zhang N (China) Zhao YL	21	21
(Indonesia) M Rijal (Indonesia) D Susanto	11	7
3	(Denmark) J Fischer Nielsen (Denmark) C Pedersen	21	21
(India) Diju V. (India) J Gutta	5	7

Semifinals
1	(China) Zhang N (China) Zhao YL	12	21	20
3	(Denmark) J Fischer Nielsen (Denmark) C Pedersen	21	14	22

=== Bottom half ===
First Round
(Denmark) M Pieler Kolding (Denmark) J Houmann	21	12	23
(Thailand) M Jongjit (Thailand) S Amitrapai	14	21	21
(Chinese Taipei) Lee S-m (Chinese Taipei) Chien Y-c	12	10
5	(China) Xu C (China) Ma J	21	21
Q1	(South Korea) Yoo Y-s (South Korea) Jang Y-n	22	15
Q2	(South Korea) Kim K-j (South Korea) Jung K-e	24	21
(Denmark) T Laybourn (Denmark) K Rytter Juhl	21	21
4	(Thailand) S Prapakamol (Thailand) S Thoungthongkam	12	19
(England) N Robertson (England) J Wallwork	15	19
(Japan) S Ikeda (Japan) R Shiota	21	21
PFQ	(Singapore) D B Chrisnanta (Singapore) Y Y V Neo	16	22	21
6	(Chinese Taipei) Chen H-l (Chinese Taipei) Cheng W-h	21	20	14
(Indonesia) F Kurniawan (Indonesia) P Z Bernadeth	14	16
Q3	(South Korea) Ko S-h (South Korea) Eom H-w	21	21
(South Korea) Lee Y-d (South Korea) Ha J-e	21	12	21
2	(Indonesia) T Ahmad (Indonesia) L Natsir	15	21	17

Second Round
(Denmark) M Pieler Kolding (Denmark) J Houmann	12	16
5	(China) Xu C (China) Ma J	21	21
Q2	(South Korea) Kim K-j (South Korea) Jung K-e	10	15
(Denmark) T Laybourn (Denmark) K Rytter Juhl	21	21
(Japan) S Ikeda (Japan) R Shiota	21	22
PFQ	(Singapore) D B Chrisnanta (Singapore) Y Y V Neo	16	20
Q3	(South Korea) Ko S-h (South Korea) Eom H-w	16	18
(South Korea) Lee Y-d (South Korea) Ha J-e	21	21

Quarterfinals
5	(China) Xu C (China) Ma J	21	21
(Denmark) T Laybourn (Denmark) K Rytter Juhl	11	12
(Japan) S Ikeda (Japan) R Shiota	17	10
2	(South Korea) Lee Y-d (South Korea) Ha J-e	21	21

Semifinals
5	(China) Xu C (China) Ma J	21	24
2	(South Korea) Lee Y-d (South Korea) Ha J-e	12	22

=== Finals ===
Semifinals
1	(China) Zhang Nan (China) Zhao Yunlei	12	21	20
3	(Denmark) Joachim Fischer Nielsen (Denmark) Christinna Pedersen	21	14	22
5	(China) Xu Chen (China) Ma Jin	21	24
2	(South Korea) Lee Yong-dae (South Korea) Ha Jung-eun	12	22

Final
3	(Denmark) Joachim Fischer Nielsen (Denmark) Christinna Pedersen	22	21
5	(China) Xu Chen (China) Ma Jin	20	16

Preceded by 2010 Denmark Super Series	Denmark Super Series	Succeeded by 2012 Denmark Super Series Premier
Preceded by 2011 Japan Super Series	2011 BWF Super Series	Succeeded by 2011 French Super Series
