= 2012 French Super Series =

Tournament details
- Dates: 23–28 October 2012
- Total prize money: US$200,000
- Venue: Stade Pierre De Coubertin
- Location: Paris

The 2012 French Super Series is a top level badminton competition which took place from October 23, 2012 to October 28, 2012 in Paris, France. It was the tenth BWF Super Series competition on the 2012 BWF Super Series schedule. The total purse for the event was $200,000.

== Men's singles ==
=== Seeds ===
1. (Indonesia) Simon Santoso (withdrew)
2. (Japan) Sho Sasaki
3. (Denmark) Peter Gade
4. (China) Du Pengyu
5. (Japan) Kenichi Tago
6. (Denmark) Jan Ø. Jørgensen
7. (Hong Kong) Hu Yun
8. (China) Wang Zhengming

=== Top half ===
First Round
1	(Indonesia) S Santoso
(Malaysia) Tan C S	w	/	o
(Denmark) V Axelsen	21	21
(Spain) P Abían	10	15
8	(China) Wang ZM	21	21
(Germany) M Zwiebler	13	17
(Russia) V Ivanov	13	14
(Chinese Taipei) Hsu J-h	21	21
4	(China) Du PY	21	21	10
(Hong Kong) Wong W K	23	16	21
(Indonesia) S D Kuncoro	22	21
(India) S Varma	20	16
5	(Japan) K Tago	18	21	21
Q1	(Malaysia) Z Zulkiffli	21	4	14
Q2	(Germany) L Schmidt	8	14
(Malaysia) Chong W F	21	21

Second Round
(Malaysia) Tan C S	10	19
(Denmark) V Axelsen	21	21
8	(China) Wang ZM	21	21
(Chinese Taipei) Hsu J-h	11	9
(Hong Kong) Wong W K	w	/	o
(Indonesia) S D Kuncoro
5	(Japan) K Tago	21	21
(Malaysia) Chong W F	12	12

Quarterfinals
(Denmark) V Axelsen	21	13	21
8	(China) Wang ZM	7	21	15
(Hong Kong) Wong W K	20	9
5	(Japan) K Tago	22	21

Semifinals
(Denmark) V Axelsen	21	21
5	(Japan) K Tago	8	17

=== Bottom half ===
First Round
(Indonesia) D H Rumbaka	21	14	7^{r}
(Thailand) B Ponsana	18	21	11
Q3	(Indonesia) A K Tedjono	19	15
6	(Denmark) J Ø. Jørgensen	21	21
(India) A Jayaram	21	21
Q4	(Thailand) S Avihingsanon	16	17
(Japan) T Ueda	18	10
3	(Denmark) P Gade	21	21
(Malaysia) D Liew	21	21	21
(Chinese Taipei) Chou T-c	23	17	15
(Finland) V Lång	22	21	9
7	(Hong Kong) Hu Y	24	15	21
(Denmark) H-K Vittinghus	21	21
(England) R Ouseph	16	18
PFQ	(Sweden) H Hurskainen	16	15
2	(Japan) S Sasaki	21	21

Second Round
(Thailand) B Ponsana	10	15
6	(Denmark) J Ø. Jørgensen	21	21
(India) A Jayaram	21	17	14
3	(Denmark) P Gade	18	21	21
(Malaysia) D Liew	21	21
7	(Hong Kong) Hu Y	18	19
(Denmark) H-K Vittinghus	19	17
2	(Japan) S Sasaki	21	21

Quarterfinals
6	(Denmark) J Ø Jørgensen	18	21	21
3	(Denmark) P Gade	21	17	15
(Malaysia) D Liew	21	21
2	(Japan) S Sasaki	18	17

Semifinals
6	(Denmark) J Ø Jørgensen	21	17	10
(Malaysia) D Liew	18	21	21

=== Finals ===
Semifinals
(Denmark) Viktor Axelsen	21	21
5	(Japan) Kenichi Tago	8	17
6	(Denmark) Jan Ø. Jørgensen	21	17	10
(Malaysia) Daren Liew	18	21	21

Final
(Denmark) Viktor Axelsen	18	17
(Malaysia) Daren Liew	21	21

== Women's singles ==
=== Seeds ===
1. (India) Saina Nehwal
2. (China) Wang Shixian (second round)
3. (Denmark) Tine Baun
4. (Germany) Juliane Schenk
5. (South Korea) Sung Ji-hyun
6. (China) Jiang Yanjiao
7. (Thailand) Ratchanok Inthanon
8. (South Korea) Bae Youn-joo

=== Top half ===
First Round
1	(India) S Nehwal	21	16	21
(China) Han L	11	21	19
(Thailand) S Taerattanachai	21	21
(Czech Republic) K Gavnholt	15	10
7	(Thailand) R Inthanon	21	21
(Netherlands) Yao J	10	14
(Indonesia) A Yuswandari	21	21
(New Zealand) M Chan Ky	11	17
4	(Germany) J Schenk	21	21
(Indonesia) B Manuputi	10	12
(China) Liu X	21	21
Q3	(Japan) K Imabeppu	19	14
5	(South Korea) Sung J-h	21	4	14
(China) Chen XJ	18	21	21
(Singapore) Gu J	25	21
(Indonesia) A Firdasari	23	16

Second Round
1	(India) S Nehwal	21	21
(Thailand) S Taerattanachai	16	13
7	(Thailand) R Inthanon	21	21
(Indonesia) A Yuswandari	16	17
4	(Germany) J Schenk	19	21	21
(China) Liu X	21	11	16
(China) Chen XJ	21	21
(Singapore) Gu J	10	19

Quarterfinals
1	(India) S Nehwal	22	22
7	(Thailand) R Inthanon	20	20
4	(Germany) J Schenk	21	21
(China) Chen XJ	10	14

Semifinals
1	(India) S Nehwal	21	21
4	(Germany) J Schenk	19	8

=== Bottom half ===
First Round
(Bulgaria) L Zechiri	18	10
(Indonesia) M F Kusumastuti	21	21
(Japan) M Mitani	21	21
6	(China) Jiang YJ	14	19
(Thailand) P Buranaprasertsuk	21	21
Q4	(Canada) N Grether	11	15
(Spain) C Marín	12	6
3	(Denmark) T Baun	21	21
(Bulgaria) P Nedelcheva	23	9	17
(Hong Kong) Chan T K	21	21	21
Q1	(Thailand) N Jindapon	15	21	21
8	(South Korea) Bae Y-j	21	10	18
(Hong Kong) Yip P Y	16	19
(Japan) E Hirose	21	21
Q2	(China) Wang L	15	17
2	(China) Wang SX	21	21

Second Round
(Indonesia) M F Kusumastuti	14	9
(Japan) M Mitani	21	21
(Thailand) P Buranaprasertsuk	14	16
3	(Denmark) T Baun	21	21
(Hong Kong) Chan T K	15	21	21
Q1	(Thailand) N Jindapon	21	18	16
(Japan) E Hirose	13	21	22
2	(China) Wang SX	21	18	20

Quarterfinals
(Japan) M Mitani	21	21
3	(Denmark) T Baun	7	18
(Hong Kong) Chan T K	15	18
(Japan) E Hirose	21	21

Semifinals
(Japan) M Mitani	21	21
(Japan) E Hirose	19	10

=== Finals ===
Semifinals
1	(India) Saina Nehwal	21	21
4	(Germany) Juliane Schenk	19	8
(Japan) Minatsu Mitani	21	21
(Japan) Eriko Hirose	19	10

Final
1	(India) Saina Nehwal	19	11
(Japan) Minatsu Mitani	21	21

== Men's doubles ==
=== Seeds ===
1. (Denmark) Mathias Boe / Carsten Mogensen
2. (Malaysia) Koo Kien Keat / Tan Boon Heong
3. (Japan) Hiroyuki Endo / Kenichi Hayakawa
4. (South Korea) Kim Ki-jung / Kim Sa-rang
5. (China) Hong Wei / Shen Ye
6. (Japan) Hirokatsu Hashimoto / Noriyasu Hirata
7. (Thailand) Bodin Issara / Maneepong Jongjit
8. (China) Liu Xiaolong / Qiu Zihan

=== Top half ===
First Round
1	(Denmark) M Boe (Denmark) C Mogensen	16	15
(Indonesia) M Ahsan (Indonesia) H Setiawan	21	21
(Malaysia) Hoon T H (Malaysia) Tan W K	21	22
(Germany) P Käsbauer (Germany) J Zurwonne	19	20
5	(China) Hong W (China) Shen Y	21	21
Q2	(China) Guo ZD (China) Xu C	19	13
(Indonesia) A Pratama (Indonesia) R A Saputro	21	21
(France) R Labar (France) M Quere	10	13
3	(Japan) H Endo (Japan) K Hayakawa	15	16
(Indonesia) Y S Dasaki (Indonesia) H A Gunawan	21	21
(Germany) I Kindervater (Germany) J Schöttler	21	18	23
Q3	(Germany) J Rafli Jansen (Indonesia) I V Okvana	17	21	21
7	(Thailand) B Issara (Thailand) M Jongjit	21	21
(Malaysia) Gan T C (Malaysia) Ong S H	19	19
(Scotland) R Blair (Netherlands) K Ridder	21	21
(New Zealand) K Dennerly-Minturn (New Zealand) O Leydon-Davis	15	10

Second Round
(Indonesia) M Ahsan (Indonesia) H Setiawan	16	17
(Malaysia) Hoon T H (Malaysia) Tan W K	21	21
5	(China) Hong W (China) Shen Y	21	14	21
(Indonesia) A Pratama (Indonesia) R A Saputro	17	21	18
(Indonesia) Y S Dasaki (Indonesia) H A Gunawan	21	19	20
(Germany) I Kindervater (Germany) J Schöttler	18	21	22
7	(Thailand) B Issara (Thailand) M Jongjit	21	21
(Scotland) R Blair (Netherlands) K Ridder	13	13

Quarterfinals
(Malaysia) Hoon T H (Malaysia) Tan W K	15	22	16
5	(China) Hong W (China) Shen Y	21	20	21
(Germany) I Kindervater (Germany) J Schöttler	16	14
7	(Thailand) B Issara (Thailand) M Jongjit	21	21

Semifinals
5	(China) Hong W (China) Shen Y	17	11
7	(Thailand) B Issara (Thailand) M Jongjit	21	21

=== Bottom half ===
First Round
(China) Chai B (China) Zhang N	21	21
(Germany) M Fuchs (Germany) O Roth	19	10
(Denmark) C J Skovgård (Denmark) M Pieler Kolding	19	14
6	(Japan) H Hashimoto (Japan) N Hirata	21	21
(Indonesia) B Septano (Indonesia) A Y Wirawan	21	13	21
Q1	(Denmark) R Bonde (Denmark) M Conrad-Petersen	17	21	17
(India) T Kona (India) A Vishnu	12	7
4	(South Korea) Kim K-j (South Korea) Kim S-r	21	21
(Russia) V Ivanov (Russia) I Sozonov	21	14	17
(Thailand) P Chalardchaleam (Thailand) N Puangpuapech	16	21	21
(South Korea) Ko S-h (South Korea) Lee Y-d	21	21
8	(China) Liu XL (China) Qiu ZH	19	8
(Malaysia) M Z A Latif (Malaysia) M F M Tazari	23	16	16
(England) C Adcock (England) A Ellis	21	21	21
Q4	(Thailand) S Anugritayawon (Thailand) P Vilailak	13	16
2	(Malaysia) Koo K K (Malaysia) Tan B H	21	21

Second Round
(China) Chai B (China) Zhang N	21	21
6	(Japan) H Hashimoto (Japan) N Hirata	19	13
(Indonesia) B Septano (Indonesia) A Y Wirawan	8	18
4	(South Korea) Kim K-j (South Korea) Kim S-r	21	21
(Thailand) P Chalardchaleam (Thailand) N Puangpuapech	21	11	16
(South Korea) Ko S-h (South Korea) Lee Y-d	18	21	21
(England) C Adcock (England) A Ellis	16	17
2	(Malaysia) Koo K K (Malaysia) Tan B H	21	21

Quarterfinals
(China) Chai B (China) Zhang N	18	21	17
4	(South Korea) Kim K-j (South Korea) Kim S-r	21	14	21
(South Korea) Ko S-h (South Korea) Lee Y-d	25	16	23
2	(Malaysia) Koo K K (Malaysia) Tan H B	23	21	21

Semifinals
4	(South Korea) Kim K-j (South Korea) Kim S-r	14	20
(South Korea) Ko S-h (South Korea) Lee Y-d	21	22

=== Finals ===
Semifinals
5	(China) Hong Wei (China) Shen Ye	17	11
7	(Thailand) Bodin Issara (Thailand) Maneepong Jongjit	21	21
4	(South Korea) Kim Ki-jung (South Korea) Kim Sa-rang	14	20
(South Korea) Ko Sung-hyun (South Korea) Lee Yong-dae	21	22

Final
7	(Thailand) Bodin Issara (Thailand) Maneepong Jongjit	24	17	11
(South Korea) Ko Sung-hyun (South Korea) Lee Yong-dae	22	21	21

== Women's doubles ==
=== Seeds ===
1. (Denmark) Christinna Pedersen / Kamilla Rytter Juhl
2. (China) Bao Yixin / Zhong Qianxin
3. (Japan) Shizuka Matsuo / Mami Naito
4. (Japan) Misaki Matsutomo / Ayaka Takahashi
5. (South Korea) Eom Hye-won / Jang Ye-na
6. (Singapore) Shinta Mulia Sari / Yao Lei
7. (Hong Kong) Poon Lok Yan / Tse Ying Suet
8. (Thailand) Duanganong Aroonkesorn / Kunchala Voravichitchaikul

=== Top half ===
First Round
1	(Denmark) C Pedersen (Denmark) K Rytter Juhl	21	21
Q2	(France) E Danckers (France) A Vanderstukken	4	7
(Thailand) S Amitrapai (Thailand) S Taerattanachai	17	21	13
(Indonesia) G R Imawan (Indonesia) T R Nuraidah	21	12	21
5	(South Korea) Eom H-y (South Korea) Jang Y-n	12	15
(Malaysia) Goh L Y (Malaysia) Lim Y L	21	21
(Indonesia) P Z Bernadeth (Indonesia) R A Pradipta	21	22
(Sweden) E Lennartsson (Sweden) E Wengberg	16	20
3	(Japan) S Matsuo (Japan) M Naito	21	21
Q4	(France) L Baumann (France) L Palermo	9	8
(Macau) Wang R (Macau) Zhang ZB	21	21
(France) A Fontaine (France) E Lefel	14	18
6	(Singapore) S M Sari (Singapore) Yao L	12	8
(China) Cheng S (China) Luo Y	21	21
Q3	(Bulgaria) P Nedelcheva (Bulgaria) D Popstoikova	13	17
(Malaysia) Ng H E (Malaysia) Ng H L	21	21

Second Round
1	(Denmark) C Pedersen (Denmark) K Rytter Juhl	21	21
(Indonesia) G R Imawan (Indonesia) T R Nuraidah	13	9
(Malaysia) Goh L Y (Malaysia) Lim Y L	7	15
(Indonesia) P Z Bernadeth (Indonesia) R A Pradipta	21	21
3	(Japan) S Matsuo (Japan) M Naito	21	21
(Macau) Wang R (Macau) Zhang ZB	8	16
(China) Cheng S (China) Luo Y	11	21	21
(Malaysia) Ng H E (Malaysia) Ng H L	21	18	10

Quarterfinals
1	(Denmark) C Pedersen (Denmark) K Rytter Juhl	21	25
(Indonesia) P Z Bernadeth (Indonesia) R A Pradipta	17	23
3	(Japan) S Matsuo (Japan) M Naito	11	21	21
(China) Cheng S (China) Luo Y	21	18	18

Semifinals
1	(Denmark) C Pedersen (Denmark) K Rytter Juhl	24	21
3	(Japan) S Matsuo (Japan) M Naito	22	18

=== Bottom half ===
First Round
(Netherlands) S Barning (Netherlands) E Muskens	9	9
(China) Ma J (China) Tang JH	21	21
(Indonesia) S R Andini (Indonesia) D D Haris	21	16	21
(Thailand) D Aroonkesorn (Thailand) K Voravichitchaikul	9	21	12
(Malaysia) Hoo V K M (Malaysia) Woon K W	21	21
Q1	(Spain) M. J Lee (France) S Saite	10	12
(Canada) N Grether (Canada) C Reid	8	9
(Japan) M Matsutomo (Japan) A Takahashi	21	21
(Thailand) P Krajangjit (Thailand) P Munkitamorn	16	17
(England) L Smith (England) G White	21	21
(South Korea) Choi H-i (South Korea) Kim S-y	21	21
7	(Hong Kong) Poon L Y (Hong Kong) Tse Y S	9	15
(Indonesia) A F Agustin (Indonesia) N K Maheswari	21	21	21
(Germany) J Goliszewski (Germany) B Michels	23	13	13
(Russia) T Bibik (Russia) A Chervyakova	9	19
2	(China) Bao YX (China) Zhong QX	21	21

Second Round
(China) Ma J (China) Tang JH	21	19	21
(Indonesia) S R Andini (Indonesia) D D Haris	5	21	8
(Malaysia) Hoo V K M (Malaysia) Woon K W	13	13
4	(Japan) M Matsutomo (Japan) A Takahashi	21	21
(England) L Smith (England) G White	19	13
(South Korea) Choi H-i (South Korea) Kim S-y	21	21
(Indonesia) A F Agustin (Indonesia) N K Maheswari
2	(China) Bao YX (China) Zhong QX	w	/	o

Quarterfinals
(China) Ma J (China) Tang JH	21	21
4	(Japan) M Matsutomo (Japan) A Takahashi	11	13
(South Korea) Choi H-i (South Korea) Kim S-y	7	18
2	(China) Bao YX (China) Zhong QX	21	21

Semifinals
(China) Ma J (China) Tang JH	18	21	21
2	(China) Bao YX (China) Zhong QX	21	15	9

=== Finals ===
Semifinals
1	(Denmark) Christinna Pedersen (Denmark) Kamilla Rytter Juhl	24	21
3	(Japan) Shizuka Matsuo (Japan) Mami Naito	22	18
(China) Ma Jin (China) Tang Jinhua	18	21	21
2	(China) Bao Yixin (China) Zhong Qianxin	21	15	9

Final
1	(Denmark) Christinna Pedersen (Denmark) Kamilla Rytter Juhl	12	21
(China) Ma Jin (China) Tang Jinhua	21	23

== Mixed doubles ==
=== Seeds ===
1. (China) Xu Chen / Ma Jin
2. (China) Zhang Nan / Zhao Yunlei
3. (Denmark) Joachim Fischer Nielsen / Christinna Pedersen
4. (Indonesia) Tantowi Ahmad / Lilyana Natsir
5. (Malaysia) Chan Peng Soon / Goh Liu Ying
6. (Indonesia) Muhammad Rijal / Debby Susanto
7. (England) Chris Adcock / (Scotland) Imogen Bankier
8. (Singapore) Danny Bawa Chrisnanta / Yu Yan Vanessa Neo

=== Top half ===
First Round
1	(China) Xu C (China) Ma J	21	21
(Indonesia) M Kido (Indonesia) P Z Bernadeth	18	16
(South Korea) Kim S-r (South Korea) Choi H-i	20	12
(Denmark) M Pieler Kolding (Denmark) K Rytter Juhl	22	21
8	(Singapore) D B Chrisnanta (Singapore) Y Y V Neo	16	20
(Republic of Ireland) S Magee (Republic of Ireland) C Magee	21	22
(England) M Ellis (England) G White	18	14
(Thailand) S Anugritayawon (Thailand) K Voravichitchaikul	21	21
4	(Indonesia) T Ahmad (Indonesia) L Natsir	21	21
(France) B Careme (France) A Fontaine	15	17
(Thailand) P Chalardchaleam (Thailand) S Amitrapai	21	21
(India) K Tarun (India) A Ponnappa	18	15
7	(England) C Adcock (Scotland) I Bankier	21	21
(Austria) R Zirnwald (Austria) E Baldauf	15	16
(Indonesia) R Widianto (Indonesia) P R Dili	22	15
(Scotland) R Blair (Indonesia) V Marissa	24	21

Second Round
1	(China) Xu C (China) Ma J	22	18	21
(Denmark) M Pieler Kolding (Denmark) K Rytter Juhl	20	21	18
(Republic of Ireland) S Magee (Republic of Ireland) C Magee	15	12
(Thailand) S Anugritayawon (Thailand) K Voravichitchaikul	21	21
4	(Indonesia) T Ahmad (Indonesia) L Natsir	21	21
(Thailand) P Chalardchaleam (Thailand) S Amitrapai	19	13
7	(England) C Adcock (Scotland) I Bankier	20	21	21
(Scotland) R Blair (Indonesia) V Marissa	22	15	13

Quarterfinals
1	(China) Xu C (China) Ma J	21	21
(Thailand) S Anugritayawon (Thailand) K Voravichitchaikul	13	10
4	(Indonesia) T Ahmad (Indonesia) L Natsir	18	20
7	(England) C Adcock (Scotland) I Bankier	21	22

Semifinals
1	(China) Xu C (China) Ma J	21	21
7	(England) C Adcock (Scotland) I Bankier	14	19

=== Bottom half ===
First Round
(Russia) V Durkin (Russia) N Vislova	17	13
(China) Qiu ZH (China) Bao YX	21	21
Q4	(South Korea) Kim K-j (South Korea) Kim S-y	12	9
6	(Indonesia) M Rijal (Indonesia) D Susanto	21	21
(France) R Labar (France) L Choinet
Q2	(Germany) J Rafli Jansen (Spain) M. J Lee	13	16
Q3	(Denmark) A Kristiansen (Denmark) J Houmann	21	15	14
PFQ	(China) Hong W (China) Luo Y	14	21	21
(Japan) K Hayakawa (Japan) M Matsutomo	21	9	9
(South Korea) Shin B-c (South Korea) Eom H-w	17	21	21
(China) Tao JM (China) Tang JH	21	21
5	(Malaysia) Chan P S (Malaysia) Goh L Y	17	17
(Indonesia) I V Okvana (Indonesia) G Megawati	11	9
(Germany) M Fuchs (Germany) B Michels	21	21
Q1	(Germany) O Roth (Germany) J Goliszewski	12	9
2	(China) Zhang N (China) Zhao YL	21	21

Second Round
(China) Qiu ZH (China) Bao YX	21	21
6	(Indonesia) M Rijal (Indonesia) D Susanto	13	18
(France) R Labar (France) L Choinet	10	12
PFQ	(China) Hong W (China) Luo Y	21	21
(South Korea) Shin B-c (South Korea) Eom H-w	21	19	22
(China) Tao JM (China) Tang JH	17	21	20
(Germany) M Fuchs (Germany) B Michels	13	21	12
2	(China) Zhang N (China) Zhao YL	21	17	21

Quarterfinals
(China) Qiu ZH (China) Bao YX	21	21
PFQ	(China) Hong W (China) Luo Y	13	17
(South Korea) Shin B-c (South Korea) Eom H-w	21	21
2	(China) Zhang N (China) Zhao YL	13	19

Semifinals
(China) Qiu ZH (China) Bao YX	21	21
(South Korea) Shin B-c (South Korea) Eom H-w	13	19

=== Finals ===
Semifinals
1	(China) Xu Chen (China) Ma Jin	21	21
7	(England) Chris Adcock (Scotland) Imogen Bankier	14	19
(China) Qiu Zihan (China) Bao Yixin	21	21
(South Korea) Shin Baek-cheol (South Korea) Eom Hye-won	13	19

Final
1	(China) Xu Chen (China) Ma Jin	21	19	21
(China) Qiu Zihan (China) Bao Yixin	17	21	18
