= Wong Wing Ki =

Chinese badminton player

Wong Wing Ki 黃永棋
Personal information
- Born: Wong Shu Ki 黃書棋; 18 March 1990 (age 36) British Hong Kong
- Years active: 2006–2022
- Height: 1.80 m (5 ft 11 in)
- Weight: 74 kg (163 lb)

Sport
- Country: Hong Kong
- Sport: Badminton
- Handedness: Right
- Coached by: Tim He Yiming
- Retired: 24 August 2022

Men's singles
- Highest ranking: 10 (25 May 2017)
- Current ranking: 353 (27 December 2022)
- BWF profile
Medal record
Men's badminton
Representing Hong Kong
East Asian Games
Silver medal – second place	2013 Tianjin	Men's team
Asian Junior Championships
Bronze medal – third place	2008 Kuala Lumpur	Boys' singles
Bronze medal – third place	2008 Kuala Lumpur	Mixed team

Vincent Wong Wing Ki (Chinese: 黃永棋; Jyutping: wong^{4} wing^{5} kei^{4}, born Wong Shu Ki (黃書棋); 18 March 1990) is a retired badminton player of Chinese-Indonesian descent who represented Hong Kong.

== Name change ==
Wong Wing Ki was born Wong Shu Ki (黃書棋), but he changed his name when he was 17. "Shu" is homophonous to another word meaning "to lose" in Chinese, and he was told to change it.

== Education ==
Wong Wing Ki was a student at La Salle College. He quit school after Form 3 to concentrate on a badminton career.

== Career ==
=== 2011 Denmark Open ===
On 19 October, Wong beat Lee Hyun-il in the first round by 10–21, 21–16 and 21–14, then on 20 October, Wong Wing Ki pulled off the biggest upset of the 2011 Denmark Open when he defeated four-time world champion Lin Dan of China 21–10, 17–21, 21–19 out of the competition and progressed through to the quarter-finals. Hong Kong head coach Tim He Yiming said, "The result will have a great impact on Wong, as he is challenging for a place in next year's Olympic Games." In the third round, Wong Wing Ki lost to Sho Sasaki 21–15, 15–21, 7–21.

=== 2012 German Open ===
In the 2012 German Open, Wong Wing Ki defeated Sony Dwi Kuncoro to proceed to the last 16. He was then in superb form to claim a 21–9, 21–17, victory against 2010 World Champion Chen Jin, which set up with a quarter-final match with Jan O Jorgensen. Jorgensen ended the giant-killing run of Wong Wing Ki when he defeated the Hong Kong shuttler 21–17, 21–11.

=== 2012 London Olympics ===
Wong Wing Ki was one of eighteen players seeded in the 2012 London Olympics Men's singles tournament. Wong Wing Ki won through into the knockout stages of the men's singles event after he overcame France's Brice Leverdez 21–11, 21–16 for his second win in a row in the group stage. Wong then crashed out of the last 16, as he was defeated by third seed Chen Long, 21–17, 21–17. The second set was tied seven times, but several of the shuttle's bounces on the net didn't go Wong's way. Wong said he felt his attack from the backcourt was lethal, but he said Chen was a stronger player on the net.

=== 2022: Final match and retirement ===
Wong, who had not played in the international circuit for 2 years due to the COVID-19 pandemic, announced that the World Championships would be his final tournament. In the opening round, he defeated Belgium's Julien Carraggi 15–21, 22–20, 21–11, earning him a spot in the round of 32, facing off compatriot Ng Ka Long. The following day, Wong lost to Ng 16–21, 9–21 in straight games, ending his 17-year badminton career.

== Life after retirement ==
Months after his retirement, Wong joined Viktor Axelsen's North American Tour in Canada and played an exhibition match against the World No.1 Axelsen, which he lost in straight games.

== Achievements ==
=== Asian Junior Championships ===
Boys' singles
Year	Venue	Opponent	Score	Result
2008	Stadium Juara; Kuala Lumpur, Malaysia	(China) Wang Zhengming	14–21, 15–21	Bronze

=== BWF Grand Prix (1 title, 4 runners-up) ===
The BWF Grand Prix had two levels, the Grand Prix and Grand Prix Gold. It was a series of badminton tournaments sanctioned by the Badminton World Federation (BWF) and played between 2007 and 2017.

Men's singles
Year	Tournament	Opponent	Score	Result
2009	New Zealand Open	(Hong Kong) Chan Yan Kit	9–21, 9–21	(silver) Runner-up
2013	U.S. Open	(Vietnam) Nguyễn Tiến Minh	21–18, 17–21, 18–21	(silver) Runner-up
2014	Macau Open	(China) Xue Song	21–16, 13–21, 19–21	(silver) Runner-up
2015	Bitburger Open	(Hong Kong) Ng Ka Long	12–21, 13–21	(silver) Runner-up
2016	Vietnam Open	(Malaysia) Chong Wei Feng	21–12, 14–21, 21–13	(gold) Winner

BWF Grand Prix Gold tournament
BWF Grand Prix tournament

=== BWF International Challenge/Series (1 runner-up) ===
Men's singles
Year	Tournament	Opponent	Score	Result
2011	New Zealand International	(Japan) Riichi Takeshita	19–21, 19–21	(silver) Runner-up

BWF International Challenge tournament
BWF International Series tournament

== Record against selected opponents ==
Includes results against Olympic quarterfinals, Worlds semifinalists, and Super Series finalists, as well as all Olympic opponents.

- (China) Chen Jin 1–3
- (China) Chen Long 0–3
- (China) Du Pengyu 1–2
- (China) Lin Dan 1–2
- (China) Wang Zhengming 0–3
- (Chinese Taipei) Hsieh Yu-hsing 2–0
- (Chinese Taipei) Chou Tien-chen 3–0
- (Denmark) Peter Gade 0–2
- (Denmark) Jan Ø. Jørgensen 0–5
- (Denmark) Viktor Axelsen 2–2
- (France) Brice Leverdez 3–0
- (Germany) Marc Zwiebler 2–0
- (Hong Kong) Hu Yun 2–1
- (India) Parupalli Kashyap 0–1
- (India) Srikanth K. 1–1
- (Indonesia) Taufik Hidayat 0–6
- (Indonesia) Sony Dwi Kuncoro 1–0
- (Indonesia) Tommy Sugiarto 1–2
- (Indonesia) Simon Santoso 1–4
- (Japan) Sho Sasaki 0–1
- (Japan) Kenichi Tago 0–3
- (South Korea) Lee Hyun-il 2–8
- (South Korea) Son Wan-ho 1–1
- (Malaysia) Lee Chong Wei 0–8
- (Malaysia) Liew Daren 1–1
- (Thailand) Boonsak Ponsana 1–4
- (Uganda) Edwin Ekiring 1–0
