= Medalists at the Badminton Asia Championships – Men's singles =

Badminton championships

Badminton Asia Championships Men's Singles Champions
- Governing body: Badminton Asia
- Created: 1962; 64 years ago
- Editions: 40
- Website: https://badmintonasia.org/

Most titles
- 4: (China) Lin Dan

Current champion
- (China) Shi Yuqi (2026)

The Asian Badminton Championships is a tournament organized by the Badminton Asia Confederation to crown the best badminton players in Asia. There were two championships in 1976, one of them was unofficial/invitational. Further editions of Invitation Asian championships were held in 1977, 1978 and 1988. Below is the list of the men's singles medalists at the Badminton Asia Championships since 1962.

Year	Host City	Gold	Silver	Bronze
1962	Kuala Lumpur	(Federation of Malaya) Teh Kew San	(Federation of Malaya) Billy Ng	(Indonesia) Johnny Tjoa
1962	Kuala Lumpur	(Federation of Malaya) Teh Kew San	(Federation of Malaya) Billy Ng	(Federation of Malaya) Yew Cheng Hoe
1965	Lucknow	(India) Dinesh Khanna	(Thailand) Sangob Rattanusorn	(India) Suresh Goel
1965	Lucknow	(India) Dinesh Khanna	(Thailand) Sangob Rattanusorn	(Malaysia) Tan Yee Khan
1969	Manila	(Indonesia) Muljadi	(Malaysia) Punch Gunalan	(India) Dinesh Khanna
1969	Manila	(Indonesia) Muljadi	(Malaysia) Punch Gunalan	(Thailand) Sangob Rattanusorn
1971	Jakarta	(Malaysia) Tan Aik Mong	(Japan) Junji Honma	(Thailand) Bandid Jaiyen
1976	Hyderabad	(China) Hou Jiachang	(Indonesia) Liem Swie King	(China) Luan Jin
1976	Hyderabad	(China) Hou Jiachang	(Indonesia) Liem Swie King	(India) Prakash Padukone
1983	Calcutta	(China) Chen Changjie	(Indonesia) Eddy Kurniawan	(South Korea) Park Joo-bong
1983	Calcutta	(China) Chen Changjie	(Indonesia) Eddy Kurniawan	(China) Zhao Jianhua
1985	Kuala Lumpur	(China) Zhao Jianhua	(China) Yang Yang	(Malaysia) Misbun Sidek
1991	Kuala Lumpur	(Malaysia) Rashid Sidek	(Malaysia) Foo Kok Keong	(Indonesia) Eddy Kurniawan
1991	Kuala Lumpur	(Malaysia) Rashid Sidek	(Malaysia) Foo Kok Keong	(China) Wu Wenkai
1992	Kuala Lumpur	(Malaysia) Rashid Sidek	(Malaysia) Foo Kok Keong	(Indonesia) Fung Permadi
1992	Kuala Lumpur	(Malaysia) Rashid Sidek	(Malaysia) Foo Kok Keong	(Indonesia) Joko Suprianto
1994	Shanghai	(Malaysia) Foo Kok Keong	(China) Liu Jun	(Indonesia) Marleve Mainaky
1994	Shanghai	(Malaysia) Foo Kok Keong	(China) Liu Jun	(South Korea) Park Sung-woo
1995	Beijing	(South Korea) Park Sung-woo	(China) Sun Jun	(China) Dong Jiong
1995	Beijing	(South Korea) Park Sung-woo	(China) Sun Jun	(China) Ge Cheng
1996	Surabaya	(Indonesia) Jeffer Rosobin	(China) Luo Yigang	(Indonesia) Dwi Aryanto
1996	Surabaya	(Indonesia) Jeffer Rosobin	(China) Luo Yigang	(Indonesia) A. K. Johannes
1997	Kuala Lumpur	(China) Sun Jun	(Indonesia) Hendrawan	(Indonesia) Hermawan Susanto
1997	Kuala Lumpur	(China) Sun Jun	(Indonesia) Hendrawan	(Indonesia) Ardy Wiranata
1998	Bangkok	(China) Chen Gang	(Indonesia) Marleve Mainaky	(Indonesia) Taufik Hidayat
1998	Bangkok	(China) Chen Gang	(Indonesia) Marleve Mainaky	(China) Luo Yigang
1999	Kuala Lumpur	(China) Chen Hong	(Malaysia) Ong Ewe Hock	(Chinese Taipei) Fung Permadi
1999	Kuala Lumpur	(China) Chen Hong	(Malaysia) Ong Ewe Hock	(Indonesia) Marleve Mainaky
2000	Jakarta	(Indonesia) Taufik Hidayat	(Indonesia) Rony Agustinus	(India) Pullela Gopichand
2000	Jakarta	(Indonesia) Taufik Hidayat	(Indonesia) Rony Agustinus	(Indonesia) Marleve Mainaky
2001	Manila	(China) Xia Xuanze	(China) Lin Dan	(South Korea) Shon Seung-mo
2001	Manila	(China) Xia Xuanze	(China) Lin Dan	(Indonesia) Indra Wijaya
2002	Bangkok	(Indonesia) Sony Dwi Kuncoro	(Indonesia) Taufik Hidayat	(China) Chen Hong
2002	Bangkok	(Indonesia) Sony Dwi Kuncoro	(Indonesia) Taufik Hidayat	(China) Xia Xuanze
2003	Jakarta	(Indonesia) Sony Dwi Kuncoro	(Indonesia) Taufik Hidayat	(Hong Kong) Agus Hariyanto
2003	Jakarta	(Indonesia) Sony Dwi Kuncoro	(Indonesia) Taufik Hidayat	(Hong Kong) Ng Wei
2004	Kuala Lumpur	(Indonesia) Taufik Hidayat	(Indonesia) Sony Dwi Kuncoro	(South Korea) Park Tae-sang
2004	Kuala Lumpur	(Indonesia) Taufik Hidayat	(Indonesia) Sony Dwi Kuncoro	(South Korea) Shon Seung-mo
2005	Hyderabad	(Indonesia) Sony Dwi Kuncoro	(Malaysia) Kuan Beng Hong	(South Korea) Lee Hyun-il
2005	Hyderabad	(Indonesia) Sony Dwi Kuncoro	(Malaysia) Kuan Beng Hong	(Hong Kong) Ng Wei
2006	Johor Bahru	(Malaysia) Lee Chong Wei	(Thailand) Boonsak Ponsana	(China) Chen Yu
2006	Johor Bahru	(Malaysia) Lee Chong Wei	(Thailand) Boonsak Ponsana	(South Korea) Park Sung-hwan
2007	Johor Bahru	(Indonesia) Taufik Hidayat	(China) Chen Hong	(India) Anup Sridhar
2007	Johor Bahru	(Indonesia) Taufik Hidayat	(China) Chen Hong	(Malaysia) Yeoh Kay Bin
2008	Johor Bahru	(South Korea) Park Sung-hwan	(China) Chen Jin	(Indonesia) Sony Dwi Kuncoro
2008	Johor Bahru	(South Korea) Park Sung-hwan	(China) Chen Jin	(China) Lin Dan
2009	Suwon	(China) Bao Chunlai	(China) Chen Long	(China) Du Pengyu
2009	Suwon	(China) Bao Chunlai	(China) Chen Long	(Japan) Sho Sasaki
2010	New Delhi	(China) Lin Dan	(China) Wang Zhengming	(Thailand) Boonsak Ponsana
2010	New Delhi	(China) Lin Dan	(China) Wang Zhengming	(Japan) Kenichi Tago
2011	Chengdu	(China) Lin Dan	(China) Bao Chunlai	(China) Chen Long
2011	Chengdu	(China) Lin Dan	(China) Bao Chunlai	(China) Du Pengyu
2012	Qingdao	(China) Chen Jin	(China) Du Pengyu	(China) Chen Long
2012	Qingdao	(China) Chen Jin	(China) Du Pengyu	(China) Lin Dan
2013	Taipei	(China) Du Pengyu	(China) Chen Long	(Malaysia) Chong Wei Feng
2013	Taipei	(China) Du Pengyu	(China) Chen Long	(China) Wang Zhengming
2014	Gimcheon	(China) Lin Dan	(Japan) Sho Sasaki	(South Korea) Hwang Jong-soo
2014	Gimcheon	(China) Lin Dan	(Japan) Sho Sasaki	(China) Liu Kai
2015	Wuhan	(China) Lin Dan	(China) Tian Houwei	(China) Chen Long
2015	Wuhan	(China) Lin Dan	(China) Tian Houwei	(China) Wang Zhengming
2016	Wuhan	(Malaysia) Lee Chong Wei	(China) Chen Long	(China) Lin Dan
2016	Wuhan	(Malaysia) Lee Chong Wei	(China) Chen Long	(China) Tian Houwei
2017	Wuhan	(China) Chen Long	(China) Lin Dan	(Malaysia) Lee Chong Wei
2017	Wuhan	(China) Chen Long	(China) Lin Dan	(China) Shi Yuqi
2018	Wuhan	(Japan) Kento Momota	(China) Chen Long	(Malaysia) Lee Chong Wei
2018	Wuhan	(Japan) Kento Momota	(China) Chen Long	(India) Prannoy Kumar
2019	Wuhan	(Japan) Kento Momota	(China) Shi Yuqi	(Chinese Taipei) Chou Tien-chen
2019	Wuhan	(Japan) Kento Momota	(China) Shi Yuqi	(Vietnam) Nguyễn Tiến Minh
2022	Manila	(Malaysia) Lee Zii Jia	(Indonesia) Jonatan Christie	(Indonesia) Chico Aura Dwi Wardoyo
2022	Manila	(Malaysia) Lee Zii Jia	(Indonesia) Jonatan Christie	(China) Weng Hongyang
2023	Dubai	(Indonesia) Anthony Sinisuka Ginting	(Singapore) Loh Kean Yew	(China) Lu Guangzu
2023	Dubai	(Indonesia) Anthony Sinisuka Ginting	(Singapore) Loh Kean Yew	(Japan) Kanta Tsuneyama
2024	Ningbo	(Indonesia) Jonatan Christie	(China) Li Shifeng	(China) Shi Yuqi
2024	Ningbo	(Indonesia) Jonatan Christie	(China) Li Shifeng	(Japan) Kodai Naraoka
2025	Ningbo	(Thailand) Kunlavut Vitidsarn	(China) Lu Guangzu	(Singapore) Loh Kean Yew
2025	Ningbo	(Thailand) Kunlavut Vitidsarn	(China) Lu Guangzu	(China) Li Shifeng
2026	Ningbo	(China) Shi Yuqi	(India) Ayush Shetty	(Thailand) Kunlavut Vitidsarn
2026	Ningbo	(China) Shi Yuqi	(India) Ayush Shetty	(Chinese Taipei) Chou Tien-chen

== Medal table ==
*Accurate as of 2026 Badminton Asia Championships.

Rank	Nation	Gold	Silver	Bronze	Total
1	China	16	19	26	61
2	Indonesia	10	9	15	34
3	Malaysia	8	6	7	21
4	Japan	2	2	4	8
5	South Korea	2	0	8	10
6	Thailand	1	2	4	7
7	India	1	1	6	8
8	Singapore	0	1	1	2
9	Chinese Taipei	0	0	3	3
9	Hong Kong	0	0	3	3
11	Vietnam	0	0	1	1
Totals (11 entries)		40	40	78	158

== Unofficial/Invitational Asian Badminton Championships ==
Year	Host City	Gold	Silver	Bronze
1976 (I)	Bangkok	(Indonesia) Iie Sumirat	(China) Hou Jiachang	(China) Tang Xianhu
1977	Hong Kong	(China) Yu Yaodong	(China) Luan Jin	(China) Lin Shiquan
1978	Peking	(China) Yu Yaodong	(China) Chen Tianlong	(China) Luan Jin
1980	Bangkok	(China) Han Jian	(China) Chen Changjie	(China) Li Zhifeng
1980	Bangkok	(China) Han Jian	(China) Chen Changjie	(China) Yang Kesen
1988	Bandar Lampung	(China) Xiong Guobao	(Malaysia) Foo Kok Keong	(China) Liu Zhiheng
1988	Bandar Lampung	(China) Xiong Guobao	(Malaysia) Foo Kok Keong	(Indonesia) Ardy Wiranata
