= Medalists at the Badminton Asia Championships – Mixed doubles =

Badminton championships

Badminton Asia Championships Mixed Doubles Champions
- Governing body: Badminton Asia
- Created: 1962; 64 years ago
- Editions: 38
- Website: https://badmintonasia.org/

Most titles
- 4: (South Korea) Kim Dong-moon

Current champion
- (South Korea) Kim Jae-hyeon (South Korea) Jang Ha-jeong (2026)

The Asian Badminton Championships is a tournament organized by the Badminton Asia Confederation to crown the best badminton players in Asia. Below is the list of the mixed doubles medalists at the Badminton Asia Championships since 1962.

Year	Host City	Gold	Silver	Bronze
1962	Kuala Lumpur	(Federation of Malaya) Lim Say Hup (Federation of Malaya) Ng Mei Ling	(Thailand) Chuchart Vatanatham (Thailand) Prathin Pattabongse	(Thailand) Chavalert Chumkum (Thailand) Pankae Phongarn
1962	Kuala Lumpur	(Federation of Malaya) Lim Say Hup (Federation of Malaya) Ng Mei Ling	(Thailand) Chuchart Vatanatham (Thailand) Prathin Pattabongse	(Indonesia) Kho Han Tjiang (Indonesia) Corry Kawilarang
1965	Lucknow	(Malaysia) Tan Yee Khan (England) Angela Bairstow	(Thailand) Chavalert Chumkum (England) Ursula Smith	(India) Owen Roncon (India) Sarojini Apte
1965	Lucknow	(Malaysia) Tan Yee Khan (England) Angela Bairstow	(Thailand) Chavalert Chumkum (England) Ursula Smith	(India) A. I. Sheikh (India) Achala Karnik
1971	Jakarta	(Indonesia) Christian Hadinata (Indonesia) Retno Kustijah	(Indonesia) Indra Gunawan (Indonesia) Intan Nurtjahja	(Indonesia) Tata Budiman (Indonesia) Poppy Tumengkol
1976	Hyderabad	(China) Fang Kaixiang (China) He Cuiling	(Japan) Shoichi Toganoo (Japan) Etsuko Toganoo	(China) Sun Zhian (China) Li Fang
1976	Hyderabad	(China) Fang Kaixiang (China) He Cuiling	(Japan) Shoichi Toganoo (Japan) Etsuko Toganoo	(Japan) Masao Tsuchida (Japan) Mika Ikeda
1983	Calcutta	(South Korea) Park Joo-bong (South Korea) Kim Yun-ja	(Indonesia) Hafid Yusuf (Indonesia) Ruth Damyanti	(Thailand) Jutatip Banjongsilp (Thailand) Preecha Sopajaree
1983	Calcutta	(South Korea) Park Joo-bong (South Korea) Kim Yun-ja	(Indonesia) Hafid Yusuf (Indonesia) Ruth Damyanti	(Indonesia) Hadibowo (Indonesia) Maria Fransisca
1991	Kuala Lumpur	(South Korea) Park Joo-bong (South Korea) Chung Myung-hee	(South Korea) Lee Sang-bok (South Korea) Chung So-young	(Malaysia) Tan Kim Her (Malaysia) Tan Sui Hoon
1991	Kuala Lumpur	(South Korea) Park Joo-bong (South Korea) Chung Myung-hee	(South Korea) Lee Sang-bok (South Korea) Chung So-young	(China) Yu Yong (China) Wu Yuhong
1992	Kuala Lumpur	(Indonesia) Joko Mardianto (Indonesia) Sri Untari	(Hong Kong) Chan Siu Kwong (Hong Kong) Chung Hoi Yuk	(Indonesia) Nunung Mudijanto (Indonesia) S. Herawati
1992	Kuala Lumpur	(Indonesia) Joko Mardianto (Indonesia) Sri Untari	(Hong Kong) Chan Siu Kwong (Hong Kong) Chung Hoi Yuk	(Malaysia) Tan Kim Her (Malaysia) Tan Sui Hoon
1994	Shanghai	(China) Chen Xingdong (China) Sun Man	(China) Liu Jianjun (China) Wang Xiaoyuan	(Indonesia) Sandiarto (Indonesia) Sri Untari
1994	Shanghai	(China) Chen Xingdong (China) Sun Man	(China) Liu Jianjun (China) Wang Xiaoyuan	(South Korea) Yoo Yong-sung (South Korea) Jang Hye-ock
1995	Beijing	(China) Liu Yong (China) Ge Fei	(China) Zhang Jin (China) Jiang Xin	(South Korea) Kim Dong-moon (South Korea) Kim Shin-young
1995	Beijing	(China) Liu Yong (China) Ge Fei	(China) Zhang Jin (China) Jiang Xin	(Indonesia) Sandiarto (Indonesia) Sri Untari
1996	Surabaya	(Indonesia) Tri Kusharjanto (Indonesia) Lili Tampi	(South Korea) Kang Kyung-jin (South Korea) Kim Mee-hyang	(South Korea) Ha Tae-kwon (South Korea) Kim Shin-young
1996	Surabaya	(Indonesia) Tri Kusharjanto (Indonesia) Lili Tampi	(South Korea) Kang Kyung-jin (South Korea) Kim Mee-hyang	(Indonesia) Flandy Limpele (Indonesia) Rosalina Riseu
1997	Kuala Lumpur	(China) Zhang Jun (China) Liu Lu	(China) Yang Ming (China) Qian Hong	(Indonesia) Wahyu Agung (Indonesia) Rosalina Riseu
1997	Kuala Lumpur	(China) Zhang Jun (China) Liu Lu	(China) Yang Ming (China) Qian Hong	(Indonesia) Sandiarto (Indonesia) Finarsih
1998	Bangkok	(South Korea) Kim Dong-moon (South Korea) Ra Kyung-min	(China) Sun Jun (China) Ge Fei	(China) Chen Gang (China) Tang Hetian
1998	Bangkok	(South Korea) Kim Dong-moon (South Korea) Ra Kyung-min	(China) Sun Jun (China) Ge Fei	(Indonesia) Bambang Suprianto (Indonesia) Zelin Resiana
1999	Kuala Lumpur	(South Korea) Kim Dong-moon (South Korea) Ra Kyung-min	(China) Liu Yong (China) Ge Fei	(Indonesia) Tri Kusharjanto (Indonesia) Zelin Resiana
1999	Kuala Lumpur	(South Korea) Kim Dong-moon (South Korea) Ra Kyung-min	(China) Liu Yong (China) Ge Fei	(Indonesia) Bambang Suprianto (Indonesia) Minarti Timur
2000	Jakarta	(Indonesia) Bambang Suprianto (Indonesia) Minarti Timur	(Indonesia) Wahyu Agung (Indonesia) Emma Ermawati	(Indonesia) Tri Kusharjanto (Indonesia) Vita Marissa
2000	Jakarta	(Indonesia) Bambang Suprianto (Indonesia) Minarti Timur	(Indonesia) Wahyu Agung (Indonesia) Emma Ermawati	(Indonesia) Santoso Sugiharjo (Indonesia) Eny Widiowati
2001	Manila	(South Korea) Kim Dong-moon (South Korea) Ra Kyung-min	(Indonesia) Bambang Suprianto (Indonesia) Minarti Timur	(Indonesia) Tony Gunawan (Indonesia) Vita Marissa
2001	Manila	(South Korea) Kim Dong-moon (South Korea) Ra Kyung-min	(Indonesia) Bambang Suprianto (Indonesia) Minarti Timur	(Indonesia) Tri Kusharjanto (Indonesia) Emma Ermawati
2002	Bangkok	(China) Zhang Jun (China) Gao Ling	(Thailand) Khunakorn Sudhisodhi (Thailand) Saralee Thungthongkam	(Indonesia) Tri Kusharjanto (Indonesia) Emma Ermawati
2002	Bangkok	(China) Zhang Jun (China) Gao Ling	(Thailand) Khunakorn Sudhisodhi (Thailand) Saralee Thungthongkam	(China) Wang Wei (China) Zhao Tingting
2003	Jakarta	(Indonesia) Nova Widianto (Indonesia) Vita Marissa	(Indonesia) Anggun Nugroho (Indonesia) Eny Widiowati	(South Korea) Kim Yong-hyun (South Korea) Lee Hyo-jung
2003	Jakarta	(Indonesia) Nova Widianto (Indonesia) Vita Marissa	(Indonesia) Anggun Nugroho (Indonesia) Eny Widiowati	(Hong Kong) Liu Kwok Wa (Hong Kong) Koon Wai Chee
2004	Kuala Lumpur	(South Korea) Kim Dong-moon (South Korea) Ra Kyung-min	(Thailand) Sudket Prapakamol (Thailand) Saralee Thungthongkam	(Indonesia) Nova Widianto (Indonesia) Vita Marissa
2004	Kuala Lumpur	(South Korea) Kim Dong-moon (South Korea) Ra Kyung-min	(Thailand) Sudket Prapakamol (Thailand) Saralee Thungthongkam	(China) Xie Zhongbo (China) Yu Yang
2005	Hyderabad	(Thailand) Sudket Prapakamol (Thailand) Saralee Thungthongkam	(South Korea) Lee Jae-jin (South Korea) Lee Hyo-jung	(Hong Kong) Albertus Susanto Njoto (Hong Kong) Li Wing Mui
2005	Hyderabad	(Thailand) Sudket Prapakamol (Thailand) Saralee Thungthongkam	(South Korea) Lee Jae-jin (South Korea) Lee Hyo-jung	(Indonesia) Muhammad Rijal (Indonesia) Endang Nursugianti
2006	Johor Bahru	(Indonesia) Nova Widianto (Indonesia) Liliyana Natsir	(Thailand) Sudket Prapakamol (Thailand) Saralee Thungthongkam	(Singapore) Hendri Saputra (Singapore) Li Yujia
2006	Johor Bahru	(Indonesia) Nova Widianto (Indonesia) Liliyana Natsir	(Thailand) Sudket Prapakamol (Thailand) Saralee Thungthongkam	(China) Zhang Wei (China) Yu Yang
2007	Johor Bahru	(China) He Hanbin (China) Yu Yang	(China) Xu Chen (China) Zhao Tingting	(Indonesia) Devin Lahardi Fitriawan (Indonesia) Lita Nurlita
2007	Johor Bahru	(China) He Hanbin (China) Yu Yang	(China) Xu Chen (China) Zhao Tingting	(Malaysia) Mohd Fairuzizuan Mohd Tazari (Malaysia) Wong Pei Tty
2008	Johor Bahru	(Indonesia) Flandy Limpele (Indonesia) Vita Marissa	(Indonesia) Nova Widianto (Indonesia) Liliyana Natsir	(Chinese Taipei) Fang Chieh-min (Chinese Taipei) Cheng Wen-hsing
2008	Johor Bahru	(Indonesia) Flandy Limpele (Indonesia) Vita Marissa	(Indonesia) Nova Widianto (Indonesia) Liliyana Natsir	(China) He Hanbin (China) Yu Yang
2009	Suwon	(South Korea) Lee Yong-dae (South Korea) Lee Hyo-jung	(South Korea) Yoo Yeon-seong (South Korea) Kim Min-jung	(Japan) Noriyasu Hirata (Japan) Miyuki Maeda
2009	Suwon	(South Korea) Lee Yong-dae (South Korea) Lee Hyo-jung	(South Korea) Yoo Yeon-seong (South Korea) Kim Min-jung	(China) Tao Jiaming (China) Ma Jin
2010	New Delhi	(Malaysia) Chan Peng Soon (Malaysia) Goh Liu Ying	(South Korea) Yoo Yeon-seong (South Korea) Kim Min-jung	(Indonesia) Devin Lahardi Fitriawan (Indonesia) Liliyana Natsir
2010	New Delhi	(Malaysia) Chan Peng Soon (Malaysia) Goh Liu Ying	(South Korea) Yoo Yeon-seong (South Korea) Kim Min-jung	(China) Qiu Zihan (China) Tian Qing
2011	Chengdu	(China) Zhang Nan (China) Zhao Yunlei	(China) Xu Chen (China) Ma Jin	(China) Hong Wei (China) Pan Pan
2011	Chengdu	(China) Zhang Nan (China) Zhao Yunlei	(China) Xu Chen (China) Ma Jin	(Thailand) Sudket Prapakamol (Thailand) Saralee Thungthongkam
2012	Qingdao	(China) Zhang Nan (China) Zhao Yunlei	(China) Xu Chen (China) Ma Jin	(South Korea) Kang Ji-wook (South Korea) Eom Hye-won
2012	Qingdao	(China) Zhang Nan (China) Zhao Yunlei	(China) Xu Chen (China) Ma Jin	(South Korea) Kim Sa-rang (South Korea) Choi Hye-in
2013	Taipei	(South Korea) Ko Sung-hyun (South Korea) Kim Ha-na	(China) Zhang Nan (China) Zhao Yunlei	(Indonesia) Fran Kurniawan (Indonesia) Shendy Puspa Irawati
2013	Taipei	(South Korea) Ko Sung-hyun (South Korea) Kim Ha-na	(China) Zhang Nan (China) Zhao Yunlei	(Hong Kong) Lee Chun Hei (Hong Kong) Chau Hoi Wah
2014	Gimcheon	(Hong Kong) Lee Chun Hei (Hong Kong) Chau Hoi Wah	(South Korea) Shin Baek-cheol (South Korea) Chang Ye-na	(Thailand) Sudket Prapakamol (Thailand) Saralee Thungthongkam
2014	Gimcheon	(Hong Kong) Lee Chun Hei (Hong Kong) Chau Hoi Wah	(South Korea) Shin Baek-cheol (South Korea) Chang Ye-na	(China) Zhang Wen (China) Xia Huan
2015	Wuhan	(Indonesia) Tontowi Ahmad (Indonesia) Liliyana Natsir	(Hong Kong) Lee Chun Hei (Hong Kong) Chau Hoi Wah	(Japan) Kenichi Hayakawa (Japan) Misaki Matsutomo
2015	Wuhan	(Indonesia) Tontowi Ahmad (Indonesia) Liliyana Natsir	(Hong Kong) Lee Chun Hei (Hong Kong) Chau Hoi Wah	(China) Xu Chen (China) Ma Jin
2016	Wuhan	(China) Zhang Nan (China) Zhao Yunlei	(Indonesia) Tontowi Ahmad (Indonesia) Liliyana Natsir	(South Korea) Ko Sung-hyun (South Korea) Kim Ha-na
2016	Wuhan	(China) Zhang Nan (China) Zhao Yunlei	(Indonesia) Tontowi Ahmad (Indonesia) Liliyana Natsir	(South Korea) Shin Baek-cheol (South Korea) Chae Yoo-jung
2017	Wuhan	(China) Lu Kai (China) Huang Yaqiong	(Thailand) Dechapol Puavaranukroh (Thailand) Sapsiree Taerattanachai	(Hong Kong) Lee Chun Hei (Hong Kong) Chau Hoi Wah
2017	Wuhan	(China) Lu Kai (China) Huang Yaqiong	(Thailand) Dechapol Puavaranukroh (Thailand) Sapsiree Taerattanachai	(China) Wang Yilyu (China) Huang Dongping
2018	Wuhan	(China) Wang Yilyu (China) Huang Dongping	(Indonesia) Tontowi Ahmad (Indonesia) Liliyana Natsir	(China) Zhang Nan (China) Li Yinhui
2018	Wuhan	(China) Wang Yilyu (China) Huang Dongping	(Indonesia) Tontowi Ahmad (Indonesia) Liliyana Natsir	(China) Zheng Siwei (China) Huang Yaqiong
2019	Wuhan	(China) Wang Yilyu (China) Huang Dongping	(China) He Jiting (China) Du Yue	(Thailand) Dechapol Puavaranukroh (Thailand) Sapsiree Taerattanachai
2019	Wuhan	(China) Wang Yilyu (China) Huang Dongping	(China) He Jiting (China) Du Yue	(China) Zheng Siwei (China) Huang Yaqiong
2022	Manila	(China) Zheng Siwei (China) Huang Yaqiong	(China) Wang Yilyu (China) Huang Dongping	(Indonesia) Praveen Jordan (Indonesia) Melati Daeva Oktavianti
2022	Manila	(China) Zheng Siwei (China) Huang Yaqiong	(China) Wang Yilyu (China) Huang Dongping	(Japan) Yuta Watanabe (Japan) Arisa Higashino
2023	Dubai	(China) Jiang Zhenbang (China) Wei Yaxin	(China) Zheng Siwei (China) Huang Yaqiong	(Malaysia) Goh Soon Huat (Malaysia) Shevon Jemie Lai
2023	Dubai	(China) Jiang Zhenbang (China) Wei Yaxin	(China) Zheng Siwei (China) Huang Yaqiong	(Indonesia) Dejan Ferdinansyah (Indonesia) Gloria Emanuelle Widjaja
2024	Ningbo	(China) Feng Yanzhe (China) Huang Dongping	(South Korea) Seo Seung-jae (South Korea) Chae Yoo-jung	(China) Zheng Siwei (China) Huang Yaqiong
2024	Ningbo	(China) Feng Yanzhe (China) Huang Dongping	(South Korea) Seo Seung-jae (South Korea) Chae Yoo-jung	(China) Jiang Zhenbang (China) Wei Yaxin
2025	Ningbo	(Hong Kong) Tang Chun Man (Hong Kong) Tse Ying Suet	(Japan) Hiroki Midorikawa (Japan) Natsu Saito	(China) Jiang Zhenbang (China) Wei Yaxin
2025	Ningbo	(Hong Kong) Tang Chun Man (Hong Kong) Tse Ying Suet	(Japan) Hiroki Midorikawa (Japan) Natsu Saito	(Indonesia) Jafar Hidayatullah (Indonesia) Felisha Pasaribu
2026	Ningbo	(South Korea) Kim Jae-hyeon (South Korea) Jang Ha-jeong	(Thailand) Dechapol Puavaranukroh (Thailand) Supissara Paewsampran	(China) Feng Yanzhe (China) Huang Dongping
2026	Ningbo	(South Korea) Kim Jae-hyeon (South Korea) Jang Ha-jeong	(Thailand) Dechapol Puavaranukroh (Thailand) Supissara Paewsampran	(Japan) Yuta Watanabe (Japan) Maya Taguchi

== Medal table ==
*Accurate as of 2026 Badminton Asia Championships.

Rank	Nation	Gold	Silver	Bronze	Total
1	China	15	12	20	47
2	South Korea	9	7	8	24
3	Indonesia	8	8	25	41
4	Malaysia	2.5	0	4	6.5
5	Hong Kong	2	2	4	8
6	Thailand	1	6.5	5	12.5
7	England	0.5	0.5	0	1
8	Japan	0	2	5	7
9	India	0	0	2	2
10	Chinese Taipei	0	0	1	1
10	Singapore	0	0	1	1
Totals (11 entries)		38	38	75	151
