= 2012 Badminton Asia Championships =

Badminton championships

Tournament information
- Location: Qingdao, China
- Dates: April 17–April 22

The 2012 Badminton Asia Championships was the 31st tournament of the Badminton Asia Championships. It was held in Qingdao, China from April 17 to April 22, 2012.

== Medalists ==
Event	Gold	Silver	Bronze
Men's singles	(China) Chen Jin	(China) Du Pengyu	(China) Lin Dan
Men's singles	(China) Chen Jin	(China) Du Pengyu	(China) Chen Long
Women's singles	(China) Li Xuerui	(China) Wang Yihan	(China) Wang Shixian
Women's singles	(China) Li Xuerui	(China) Wang Yihan	(China) Chen Xiaojia
Men's doubles	(South Korea) Kim Ki-jung (South Korea) Kim Sa-rang	(Japan) Hiroyuki Endo (Japan) Kenichi Hayakawa	(China) Chai Biao (China) Guo Zhendong
Men's doubles	(South Korea) Kim Ki-jung (South Korea) Kim Sa-rang	(Japan) Hiroyuki Endo (Japan) Kenichi Hayakawa	(China) Hong Wei (China) Shen Ye
Women's doubles	(China) Tian Qing (China) Zhao Yunlei	(China) Bao Yixin (China) Zhong Qianxin	(China) Cheng Shu (China) Pan Pan
Women's doubles	(China) Tian Qing (China) Zhao Yunlei	(China) Bao Yixin (China) Zhong Qianxin	(Japan) Shizuka Matsuo (Japan) Mami Naito
Mixed doubles	(China) Zhang Nan (China) Zhao Yunlei	(China) Xu Chen (China) Ma Jin	(South Korea) Kim Sa-rang (South Korea) Choi Hye-in
Mixed doubles	(China) Zhang Nan (China) Zhao Yunlei	(China) Xu Chen (China) Ma Jin	(South Korea) Kang Ji-wook (South Korea) Eom Hye-won

== Men's singles ==
=== Finals ===
Semi-finals
1	(China) Lin Dan
3	(China) Chen Jin	w	/	o
5	(China) Du Pengyu	17	21	21
2	(China) Chen Long	21	16	12

Final
3	(China) Chen Jin	21	21
5	(China) Du Pengyu	12	18

=== Top half ===
==== Section 1 ====
First round
1	(China) Lin D	21	21
(Japan) R Takeshita	13	8
Q8	(Uzbekistan) A Savatyugin	6	4
(Singapore) Huang C	21	21
15	(India) A Jayaram	21	21
(Chinese Taipei) Hsu J-h	19	19
(South Korea) Hong J-h	21	17	19
(Hong Kong) Wei N	15	21	21
6	(Indonesia) T Hidayat
(Japan) T Ueda
(China) Zhou WL	21	21
(Malaysia) Chan K B	18	11
14	(Thailand) B Ponsana	21	21
(Chinese Taipei) Shih K-c	11	18
(Philippines) P J Vivas
Q5	bye

Second round
1	(China) Lin D	21	21
(Singapore) Huang C	17	18
15	(India) A Jayaram	22	21	15
(Hong Kong) Wei N	24	11	21
(Japan) T Ueda	16	20
(China) Zhou WL	21	22
14	(Thailand) B Ponsana	w	/	o
(Philippines) P J Vivas

Third round
1	(China) Lin D	21	21
(Hong Kong) Wei N	8	18
(China) Zhou WL	14	15
14	(Thailand) B Ponsana	21	21

Quarter-finals
1	(China) Lin D	21	21
14	(Thailand) B Ponsana	15	10

==== Section 2 ====
First round
3	(China) Chen J	21	21
(Malaysia) Chong W F	14	9
(Chinese Taipei) Chu H-c	21	21
Q1	(Uzbekistan) O Savatugin	6	6
9	(Indonesia) T Sugiarto
(Macau) Lam C M	w	/	o
(Japan) K Momota	w	/	o
(Philippines) P G Magnaye
7	(Vietnam) Nguyễn T M	21	22
(India) H S Prannoy	6	20
(Turkmenistan) T Poladov	2	2
(Singapore) A Chen	21	21
12	(Hong Kong) Hu Y	21	21
(South Korea) Lee H-j	17	19
(Mongolia) M Dsoldsajaa	13	17
Q7	(Cambodia) Sok C	21	21

Second round
3	(China) Chen J	21	21
(Chinese Taipei) Chu H-c	13	5
(Macau) Lam C M	7	4
(Japan) K Momota	21	21
7	(Vietnam) Nguyễn T M	21	21
(Singapore) A Chen	17	17
12	(Hong Kong) Hu Y	21	21
Q7	(Cambodia) Sok C	8	6

Third round
3	(China) Chen J	21	21
(Japan) K Momota	10	10
7	(Vietnam) Nguyễn T M	21	21	17
12	(Hong Kong) Hu Y	23	5	21

Quarter-finals
3	(China) Chen J	21	21
12	(Hong Kong) Hu Y	10	14

=== Bottom half ===
==== Section 3 ====
First round
(Singapore) D Wong	w	/	o
(Philippines) P J Escueta
(Thailand) T Saensomboonsuk	21	21
PMD	(Kazakhstan) V Massimov	9	11
Q4	(Mongolia) E Erdenebajar	21	21
PMD	(Turkmenistan) A Nyyazgulyyev	14	15
(Chinese Taipei) Chou T-c	15	14
5	(China) Du PY	21	21
(China) Chen YK	21	21
(Macau) Leong K F	4	7
(Chinese Taipei) Teng S-h	15	12
10	(South Korea) Son W-h	21	21
(Hong Kong) Chan Y K	17	9
Q6	(China) Gao H	21	21
(India) S Verma	19	14
4	(Indonesia) S Santoso	21	21

Second round
(Singapore) D Wong	19	21	14
(Thailand) T Saensomboonsuk	21	15	21
Q4	(Mongolia) E Erdenebajar	3	4
5	(China) Du PY	21	21
(China) Chen YK	21	21
10	(South Korea) Son W-h	18	12
Q6	(China) Gao H	w	/	o
4	(Indonesia) S Santoso

Third round
(Thailand) T Saensomboonsuk	21	6	10
5	(China) Du PY	18	21	21
(China) Chen YK	17	21	22
Q6	(China) Gao H	21	9	24

Quarter-finals
5	(China) Du PY	21	19	21
Q6	(China) Gao H	10	21	16

==== Section 4 ====
First round
(Sri Lanka) N Karunaratne
(India) S Praneeth B	w	/	o
(Brunei) A J Jafar	6	9
11	(Hong Kong) Wong W K	21	21
(Uzbekistan) R Zakirov	21	16	21
Q2	(Cambodia) K Ngoun	8	21	15
(South Korea) Lee D-k	16	18
8	(China) Wang ZM	21	21
(Japan) S Wada	13	14
(Thailand) S Avihingsanon	21	21
Q3	(Kazakhstan) A Niyazov	10	8
13	(Indonesia) D H Rumbaka	21	21
(Chinese Taipei) Hsueh H-y	w	/	o
(Maldives) M A Rasheed
(India) K Parupalli	9	13
2	(China) Chen L	21	21

Second round
(India) S Praneeth B	21	21
11	(Hong Kong) Wong W K	19	16
(Uzbekistan) R Zakirov	6	5
8	(China) Wang ZM	21	21
(Thailand) S Avihingsanon	16	16
13	(Indonesia) D H Rumbaka	21	21
(Chinese Taipei) Hsueh H-y	13	14
2	(China) Chen L	21	21

Third round
(India) S Praneeth B	9	18
8	(China) Wang ZM	21	21
13	(Indonesia) D H Rumbaka	8	10
2	(China) Chen L	21	21

Quarter-finals
8	(China) Wang ZM	16	16
2	(China) Chen L	21	21

== Women's singles ==
=== Finals ===
Semi-finals
1	(China) Wang Yihan	21	21
3	(China) Wang Shixian	19	12
4	(China) Li Xuerui	21	22
(China) Chen Xiaojia	15	20

Final
1	(China) Wang Yihan	16	21	9
4	(China) Li Xuerui	21	16	21

=== Top half ===
==== Section 1 ====
First round
1	(China) Wang YH	21	21
(Japan) E Hirose	13	18
Q3	(Thailand) B Ongbumrungpan	15	13
(South Korea) Bae Y-j	21	21
6	(China) Jiang YJ	21	21
(Thailand) S Taerattanachai	19	13
(Chinese Taipei) Tai T-y	21	21
(Japan) A Goto	18	18

Second round
1	(China) Wang YH	21	21
(South Korea) Bae Y-j	18	16
6	(China) Jiang YJ	21	21
(Chinese Taipei) Tai T-y	18	18

Quarter-finals
1	(China) Wang YH	21	21
6	(China) Jiang YJ	17	16

==== Section 2 ====
First round
3	(China) Wang SX	24	21
(Chinese Taipei) Pai H-m	22	14
(Japan) M Mitani	21	19	21
(Singapore) Gu J	10	21	19
8	(Thailand) R Intanon	21	17	21
(Hong Kong) Chan T K	11	21	17
Q2	(Japan) N Okuhara	11	21	19
(China) Han L	21	17	21

Second round
3	(China) Wang SX	21	21
(Japan) M Mitani	18	10
8	(Thailand) R Intanon	13	15
(China) Han L	21	21

Quarter-finals
3	(China) Wang SX	13	21	21
(China) Han L	21	12	8

=== Bottom half ===
==== Section 3 ====
First round
(South Korea) Sung J-h	12	13
(China) Wang L	21	21
Q1	(Malaysia) L Cheah	21	17	12
7	(Chinese Taipei) Cheng S-c	12	21	21
(Thailand) N Jindapol	21	21
(Japan) S Sato	15	14
(Hong Kong) Yip P Y	14	17
4	(China) Li XR	21	21

Second round
(China) Wang L	21	18	11
7	(Chinese Taipei) Cheng S-c	16	21	21
(Thailand) N Jindapol	7	16
4	(China) Li XR	21	21

Quarter-finals
7	(Chinese Taipei) Cheng S-c	7	12
4	(China) Li XR	21	21

==== Section 4 ====
First round
(China) Chen XJ	21	21
Q4	(Hong Kong) Cheung N Y	3	2
(Japan) K Imabeppu	9	12
5	(India) S Nehwal	21	21
(Malaysia) Tee J Y	14	13
(Singapore) Fu MT	21	21
(Thailand) P Buranaprasertsuk	11	9
2	(China) Wang X	21	21

Second round
(China) Chen XJ	21	21
5	(India) S Nehwal	13	16
(Singapore) Fu MT	8	10
2	(China) Wang X	21	21

Quarter-finals
(China) Chen XJ	21	21
2	(China) Wang X	15	19

== Men's doubles ==
=== Finals ===
Semi-finals
1	(China) Chai Biao (China) Guo Zhendong	17	9
(South Korea) Kim Gi-jung (South Korea) Kim Sa-rang	21	21
6	(Japan) Hiroyuki Endo (Japan) Kenichi Hayakawa	21	21
7	(China) Hong Wei (China) Shen Ye	12	17

Final
(South Korea) Kim Gi-jung (South Korea) Kim Sa-rang	21	21
6	(Japan) Hiroyuki Endo (Japan) Kenichi Hayakawa	12	16

=== Top half ===
==== Section 1 ====
First round
1	(China) Chai B (China) Guo ZD	21	21
(India) T Kona (India) A Vishnu	14	11
(Thailand) B Isara (Thailand) M Jongjit	21	21
(Chinese Taipei) Lin C-y (Chinese Taipei) Wang C-m	19	15
5	(Indonesia) A Yulianto (Indonesia) H A Gunawan	12	21	21
(Malaysia) Hoon T H (Malaysia) Tan W K	21	18	15
Q2	(Cambodia) Sok C (Cambodia) K Ngoun	21	21
(Uzbekistan) A Savatyugin (Uzbekistan) R Zakirov	18	16

Second round
1	(China) Chai B (China) Guo ZD	21	21
(Thailand) B Isara (Thailand) M Jongjit	9	18
5	(Indonesia) A Yulianto (Indonesia) H A Gunawan	21	21
Q2	(Cambodia) Sok C (Cambodia) K Ngoun	12	7

Quarter-finals
1	(China) Chai B (China) Guo ZD	21	22
5	(Indonesia) A Yulianto (Indonesia) H A Gunawan	7	20

==== Section 2 ====
First round
3	(Japan) N Kawamae (Japan) Sh Satō	21	21
(Hong Kong) Lee C H (Hong Kong) Wong W H	11	15
(South Korea) Kim G-j (South Korea) Kim S-r	21	21
(India) R Kumar (India) S Thomas	13	14
8	(China) Liu XL (China) Qiu ZH	21	21
Q4	(Kazakhstan) A Niyazov (Kazakhstan) A Ormanov	7	4
(Chinese Taipei) Chen H-l (Chinese Taipei) Lin Y-l	21	21
(Malaysia) M L Z A Khalid (Malaysia) V I Mawan	15	11

Second round
3	(Japan) N Kawamae (Japan) Sh Satō	13	16
(South Korea) Kim G-j (South Korea) Kim S-r	21	21
8	(China) Liu XL (China) Qiu ZH	21	21
(Chinese Taipei) Chen H-l (Chinese Taipei) Lin Y-l	13	15

Quarter-finals
(South Korea) Kim G-j (South Korea) Kim S-r	21	21
8	(China) Liu XL (China) Qiu ZH	12	19

=== Bottom half ===
==== Section 3 ====
First round
Q1	(Macau) Lam C M (Macau) Leong K F	13	17
(China) Li G (China) Liu C	21	21
(India) P Chopra (India) A Dewalkar	14	18
6	(Japan) H Endo (Japan) K Hayakawa	21	21
(Malaysia) Goh V S (Malaysia) Lim K W	21	21
(Vietnam) Bùi B Đ (Vietnam) Đào M T	12	11
(Indonesia) Y R Sugiarto (Indonesia) A Y Wirawan	14	20
4	(Chinese Taipei) Fang C-m (Chinese Taipei) Lee S-m	21	22

Second round
(China) Li G (China) Liu C	17	10
6	(Japan) H Endo (Japan) K Hayakawa	21	21
(Malaysia) Goh V S (Malaysia) Lim K W	14	21	21
4	(Chinese Taipei) Fang C-m (Chinese Taipei) Lee S-m	21	16	16

Quarter-finals
6	(Japan) H Endo (Japan) K Hayakawa	21	16	21
(Malaysia) Goh V S (Malaysia) Lim K W	18	21	18

==== Section 4 ====
First round
(South Korea) Cho G-w (South Korea) Kang J-w	w	/	o
(Philippines) P J Escueta (Philippines) P G Magnaye
Q3	(Cambodia) D Chin (Cambodia) C Phorrom	3	8
7	(China) Hong W (China) Shen Y	21	21
(Indonesia) A Pratama (Indonesia) R A Saputro	21	21
(Mongolia) E Erdenebajar (Mongolia) M Dsoldsajaa	9	6
(Thailand) P Chalardchaleam (Thailand) N Puangpuapech	15	21	13
2	(Japan) H Hashimoto (Japan) N Hirata	21	19	21

Second round
(South Korea) Cho G-w (South Korea) Kang J-w
7	(China) Hong W (China) Shen Y	w	/	o
(Indonesia) A Pratama (Indonesia) R A Saputro	19	17
2	(Japan) H Hashimoto (Japan) N Hirata	21	21

Quarter-finals
7	(China) Hong W (China) Shen Y	21	21
2	(Japan) H Hashimoto (Japan) N Hirata	17	11

== Women's doubles ==
=== Finals ===
Semi-finals
1	(China) Tian Qing (China) Zhao Yunlei	w	/	o
(China) Cheng Shu (China) Pan Pan
5	(Japan) Mami Naito (Japan) Shizuka Matsuo	16	19
(China) Bao Yixin (China) Zhong Qianxin	21	21

Final
1	(China) Tian Qing (China) Zhao Yunlei	21	21
(China) Bao Yixin (China) Zhong Qianxin	14	15

=== Top half ===
==== Section 1 ====
First round
(Chinese Taipei) Hsieh P-c (Chinese Taipei) Wang P-r	21	21
(Malaysia) Chin E H (Malaysia) Wong P T	14	14
(South Korea) Choi H-i (South Korea) Kim S-y	21	21
(Vietnam) Nguyễn T S (Vietnam) Vũ T T	5	9
(Singapore) S M Sari (Singapore) Yao L	15	22	13
(Thailand) S Amitrapai (Thailand) S Taerattanachai	21	20	21

Second round
1	(China) Tian Q (China) Zhao YL	21	21
(Chinese Taipei) Hsieh P-c (Chinese Taipei) Wang P-r	11	9
(South Korea) Choi H-i (South Korea) Kim S-y	21	11	21
(Thailand) S Amitrapai (Thailand) S Taerattanachai	15	21	9

Quarter-finals
1	(China) Tian Q (China) Zhao YL	21	21
(South Korea) Choi H-i (South Korea) Kim S-y	14	7

==== Section 2 ====
First round
(Hong Kong) Poon L Y (Hong Kong) Tse Y S	18	23	13
(China) Cheng S (China) Pan P	21	21	21
(Indonesia) V Marissa (Indonesia) N Melati	18	21	21
(India) J Gutta (India) A Ponnappa	21	17	7
(Uzbekistan) S Ahmadjonova (Uzbekistan) A Smirnova	7	8
(South Korea) Eom H-w (South Korea) Chang Y-n	21	21

Second round
3	(Japan) M Maeda (Japan) S Suetsuna	12	21	15
(China) Cheng S (China) Pan P	21	12	21
(Indonesia) V Marissa (Indonesia) N Melati	11	15
(South Korea) Eom H-w (South Korea) Chang Y-n	21	21

Quarter-finals
(China) Cheng S (China) Pan P	21	21
(South Korea) Eom H-w (South Korea) Chang Y-n	16	15

=== Bottom half ===
==== Section 3 ====
First round
(Malaysia) V Hoo (Malaysia) Woon K W	17	9
(Hong Kong) Chan T K (Hong Kong) Cheung NY	21	21
(Indonesia) M Jauhari (Indonesia) G Polii	11	21	17
(South Korea) Jung K-e (South Korea) Kim H-n	21	19	21
(Chinese Taipei) Cheng W-h (Chinese Taipei) Chien Y-c	16	21	25
(China) Xia H (China) Tang JH	21	15	23

Second round
(Hong Kong) Chan T K (Hong Kong) Cheung NY	15	15
(South Korea) Jung K-e (South Korea) Kim H-n	21	21
(Chinese Taipei) Cheng W-h (Chinese Taipei) Chien Y-c	13	16
4	(Japan) S Matsuo (Japan) M Naito	21	21

Quarter-finals
(South Korea) Jung KE (South Korea) Kim HN	20	21	15
4	(Japan) S Matsuo (Japan) M Naito	22	13	21

==== Section 4 ====
First round
(India) P Gadre (India) P Sawant	21	14	21
(Chinese Taipei) Chiang K-h (Chinese Taipei) Tsai P-l	13	21	16
(Hong Kong) Chan H Y (Hong Kong) Chau H W	17	15
(Thailand) D Aroonkesorn (Thailand) K Voravichitchaikul	21	21
(Indonesia) A F Agustin (Indonesia) N K Maheswari	21	22	12
(China) Bao YX (China) Zhong QX	16	24	21

Second round
(India) P Gadre (India) P Sawant	17	12
(Thailand) D Aroonkesorn (Thailand) K Voravichitchaikul	21	21
(China) Bao YX (China) Zhong QX	24	8	21
2	(Japan) M Fujii (Japan) R Kakiiwa	22	21	8

Quarter-finals
(Thailand) D Aroonkesorn (Thailand) K Voravichitchaikul	15	20
(China) Bao YX (China) Zhong QX	21	22

== Mixed doubles ==
=== Finals ===
Semi-finals
1	(China) Zhang Nan (China) Zhao Yunlei	21	12	21
(South Korea) Kim Sa-rang (South Korea) Choi Hye-in	13	21	13
(South Korea) Kang Ji-wook (South Korea) Eom Hye-won	14	12
2	(China) Xu Chen (China) Ma Jin	21	21

Final
1	(China) Zhang Nan (China) Zhao Yunlei	21	21
2	(China) Xu Chen (China) Ma Jin	13	12

=== Top half ===
==== Section 1 ====
First round
1	(China) Zhang N (China) Zhao YL	21	21
PMD	(China) Qiu ZH (China) Tang JH	12	14
Q4	(Chinese Taipei) Yang C-h (Chinese Taipei) Wen T-y	21	21
(India) T Kona (India) A Ponnappa	16	12
8	(Japan) Sh Satō (Japan) S Matsuo	22	21
(China) Hong W (China) Pan P	20	18
(Indonesia) I Fadhilah (Indonesia) W Anggraini	15
(South Korea) Cho G-w (South Korea) Chang Y-n	13

Second round
1	(China) Zhang N (China) Zhao YL	21	21
Q4	(Chinese Taipei) Yang C-h (Chinese Taipei) Wen T-y	9	7
8	(Japan) Sh Satō (Japan) S Matsuo	21	21
(Indonesia) I Fadhilah (Indonesia) W Anggraini	12	16

Quarter-finals
1	(China) Zhang N (China) Zhao YL	21	21
8	(Japan) Sh Satō (Japan) S Matsuo	15	13

==== Section 2 ====
First round
3	(Chinese Taipei) Chen H-l (Chinese Taipei) Cheng W-h	21	21
Q3	(Uzbekistan) R Zakirov (Uzbekistan) A Smirnova	7	4
(China) Tao JM (China) Xia H	21	24
(Malaysia) Tan A Q (Malaysia) Lai P J	19	22
5	(Thailand) S Prapakamol (Thailand) S Thungthongkam	13	15
(South Korea) Kim S-r (South Korea) Choi H-i	21	21
(India) V Diju (India) J Gutta	21	21
(Indonesia) R Widianto (Indonesia) R Puspita Dili	16	18

Second round
3	(Chinese Taipei) Chen H-l (Chinese Taipei) Cheng W-h	13	23	27
(China) Tao JM (China) Xia H	21	21	25
(South Korea) Kim S-r (South Korea) Choi H-i	21	11	21
(India) V Diju (India) J Gutta	14	21	17

Quarter-finals
3	(Chinese Taipei) Chen H-l (Chinese Taipei) Cheng W-h	6	20
(South Korea) Kim S-r (South Korea) Choi H-i	21	22

=== Bottom half ===
==== Section 3 ====
First round
(Chinese Taipei) Lee S-m (Chinese Taipei) Chien Y-c	21	17	21
(China) He HB (China) Bao YX	15	21	18
Q1	(Uzbekistan) A Savatyugin (Uzbekistan) S Ahmadjonova	4	6
7	(Indonesia) M Rijal (Indonesia) D Susanto	21	21
(Japan) N Hirata (Japan) M Maeda	21	21
(India) P Chopra (India) P Sawant	15	16
(South Korea) Kang J-w (South Korea) Eom H-w	21	21
4	(Malaysia) Ong J G (Malaysia) Lim Y L	12	9

Second round
(Chinese Taipei) Lee S-m (Chinese Taipei) Chien Y-c	17	13
7	(Indonesia) M Rijal (Indonesia) D Susanto	21	21
(Japan) N Hirata (Japan) M Maeda	11	14
(South Korea) Kang J-w (South Korea) Eom H-w	21	21

Quarter-finals
7	(Indonesia) M Rijal (Indonesia) D Susanto	17	21	18
(South Korea) Kang J-w (South Korea) Eom H-w	21	19	21

==== Section 4 ====
First round
(India) A Dewalkar (India) P Gadre	21	13	21
(South Korea) Kim G-j (South Korea) Jung K-e	16	21	18
(Hong Kong) Wong W H (Hong Kong) Chau H W	22	21
PMD	(Hong Kong) Lee C H (Hong Kong) Chan H Y	20	19
(Indonesia) F Kurniawan (Indonesia) S P Irawati	21	21
Q2	(Turkmenistan) A Nyýazgulyýew (Turkmenistan) V Arutyunýan	0	0
(Thailand) M Jongjit (Thailand) S Amitrapai	19	12
2	(China) Xu C (China) Ma J	21	21

Second round
(India) A Dewalkar (India) P Gadre	19	7
(Hong Kong) Wong W H (Hong Kong) Chau H W	21	21
(Indonesia) F Kurniawan (Indonesia) S P Irawati	12	9
2	(China) Xu C (China) Ma J	21	21

Quarter-finals
(Hong Kong) Wong W H (Hong Kong) Chau H W	18	8
2	(China) Xu C (China) Ma J	21	21

== Medal table ==
Rank	Nation	Gold	Silver	Bronze	Total
1	China (CHN)	4	4	7	15
2	South Korea (KOR)	1	0	2	3
3	Japan (JPN)	0	1	1	2
Totals (3 entries)		5	5	10	20
