= 2013 Badminton Asia Championships =

Badminton championships

Tournament information
- Location: Taipei, Taiwan
- Dates: April 16–April 21

The 2013 Badminton Asia Championships was the 32nd edition of the Badminton Asia Championships. It was held in Taipei, Taiwan, from April 16 to April 21.

== Venue ==
- Taipei Arena.

== Medalists ==
Event	Gold	Silver	Bronze
Men's singles	(China) Du Pengyu	(China) Chen Long	(Malaysia) Chong Wei Feng
Men's singles	(China) Du Pengyu	(China) Chen Long	(China) Wang Zhengming
Women's singles	(China) Wang Yihan	(China) Li Xuerui	(Japan) Sayaka Takahashi
Women's singles	(China) Wang Yihan	(China) Li Xuerui	(Japan) Eriko Hirose
Men's doubles	(South Korea) Ko Sung-hyun (South Korea) Lee Yong-dae	(South Korea) Kim Ki-jung (South Korea) Kim Sa-rang	(Malaysia) Goh V Shem (Malaysia) Lim Khim Wah
Men's doubles	(South Korea) Ko Sung-hyun (South Korea) Lee Yong-dae	(South Korea) Kim Ki-jung (South Korea) Kim Sa-rang	(Japan) Hiroyuki Endo (Japan) Kenichi Hayakawa
Women's doubles	(China) Wang Xiaoli (China) Yu Yang	(China) Ma Jin (China) Tang Jinhua	(South Korea) Ko A-ra (South Korea) Yoo Hae-won
Women's doubles	(China) Wang Xiaoli (China) Yu Yang	(China) Ma Jin (China) Tang Jinhua	(Indonesia) Gebby Ristiyani Imawan (Indonesia) Tiara Rosalia Nuraidah
Mixed doubles	(South Korea) Ko Sung-hyun (South Korea) Kim Ha-na	(China) Zhang Nan (China) Zhao Yunlei	(Indonesia) Fran Kurniawan (Indonesia) Shendy Puspa Irawati
Mixed doubles	(South Korea) Ko Sung-hyun (South Korea) Kim Ha-na	(China) Zhang Nan (China) Zhao Yunlei	(Hong Kong) Lee Chun Hei (Hong Kong) Chau Hoi Wah

== Men's singles ==
=== Seeds ===
1. (China) Chen Long (final)
2. (China) Du Pengyu (champion)
3. (Hong Kong) Hu Yun (2nd Round)
4. (India) Parupalli Kashyap (3rd Round)
5. (Vietnam) Nguyễn Tiến Minh (1st Round)
6. (China) Wang Zhengming (semi-final)
7. (Thailand) Boonsak Ponsana (quarter-final)
8. (Japan) Sho Sasaki (withdrew)
9. (Malaysia) Liew Daren (3rd Round)
10. (Malaysia) Chong Wei Feng (semi-final)
11. (Hong Kong) Wong Wing Ki (3rd Round)
12. (Japan) Takuma Ueda (2nd Round)
13. (Chinese Taipei) Chou Tien-chen (2nd Round)
14. (Thailand) Tanongsak Saensomboonsuk
15. (China) Gao Huan (quarter-final)
16. (Chinese Taipei) Hsu Jen-hao (2nd Round)

=== Finals ===
Quarterfinals
1	(China) Chen Long	21	20	21
7	(Thailand) Boonsak Ponsana	14	22	12
15	(China) Gao Huan	21	15	19
10	(Malaysia) Chong Wei Feng	18	21	21
6	(China) Wang Zhengming
(China) Lin Dan	W	/	O
(Hong Kong) Chan Yan Kit	18	11
2	(China) Du Pengyu	21	21

Semifinals
1	(China) Chen Long	21	21
10	(Malaysia) Chong Wei Feng	17	15
6	(China) Wang Zhengming	16	6^{r}
2	(China) Du Pengyu	21	11

Final
1	(China) Chen Long	17	19
2	(China) Du Pengyu	21	21

=== Top half ===
==== Section 1 ====
First round
1	(China) Chen Long	21	24
(Hong Kong) Ng Ka Long	12	22
(South Korea) Lee Dong-keun	21	21
PFQ	(Uzbekistan) Oleg Savatugin	9	6
13	(Chinese Taipei) Chou Tien-chen	21	21
(Bahrain) Al-Sayed Jafar Ebrahim Jafar	15	7
Q8	(Macau) Kin Hei Tai	5	10
(Malaysia) Goh Soon Huat	21	21

Second round
1	(China) Chen Long	21	21
(South Korea) Lee Dong-keun	17	4
13	(Chinese Taipei) Chou Tien-chen	18	14
(Malaysia) Goh Soon Huat	21	21

Third round
1	(China) Chen Long	22	21
(Malaysia) Goh Soon Huat	20	18

==== Section 2 ====
First round
7	(Thailand) Boonsak Ponsana	18	21	21
(Indonesia) Akbar Panji	21	11	11
(Japan) Kento Momota	21	21
(Philippines) Kevin Dalisay	12	6
11	(Hong Kong) Wong Wing Ki	21	21
Q6	(Mongolia) Khuvituguldur Byambajav	9	3
(Vietnam) Phạm Cao Cường	13	25	21
(Malaysia) Loh Wei Sheng	21	23	19

Second round
7	(Thailand) Boonsak Ponsana	21	21
(Japan) Kento Momota	13	16
11	(Hong Kong) Wong Wing Ki	21	21
(Vietnam) Phạm Cao Cường	5	12

Third round
7	(Thailand) Boonsak Ponsana	15	21	21
11	(Hong Kong) Wong Wing Ki	21	17	15

==== Section 3 ====
First round
4	(India) Parupalli Kashyap	18	21	22
(South Korea) Hong Ji-hoon	21	15	20
(Chinese Taipei) Chu Han-chou	21	21
PFQ	(Mongolia) Tsolmon Munkhbat	11	13
15	(China) Gao Huan	21	21
(Hong Kong) Wei Nan	12	15
Q4	(Maldives) Thoif Ahmed Mohamed	9	17
(Cambodia) Kanora Ngoun	21	21

Second round
4	(India) Parupalli Kashyap	21	21
(Chinese Taipei) Chu Han-chou	17	19
15	(China) Gao Huan	21	21
(Cambodia) Kanora Ngoun	3	6

Third round
4	(India) Parupalli Kashyap	19	15
15	(China) Gao Huan	21	21

==== Section 4 ====
First round
8	(Japan) Sho Sasaki	W	D	N
Q2	(Uzbekistan) Timurbek Karimov
(Indonesia) Thomi Azizan Mahbub	21	21
PFQ	(Macau) Jason Lo King Ching	8	8
10	(Malaysia) Chong Wei Feng	21	21
(Chinese Taipei) Lin Chia-hsuan	13	10
(Uzbekistan) Rafael Zakirov	12	9
(Vietnam) Nguyễn Hoàng Nam	21	21

Second round
Q2	(Uzbekistan) Timurbek Karimov	3	7
(Indonesia) Thomi Azizan Mahbub	21	21
10	(Malaysia) Chong Wei Feng	21	21
(Vietnam) Nguyễn Hoàng Nam	13	12

Third round
(Indonesia) Thomi Azizan Mahbub	17	13
10	(Malaysia) Chong Wei Feng	21	21

=== Bottom half ===
==== Section 5 ====
First round
(Indonesia) Shesar Hiren Rhustavito	21	21
Q5	(Macau) Lou Hok Man	9	6
(Chinese Taipei) Yang Chih-hsun	21	8
14	(Thailand) Tanongsak Saensomboonsuk	23	21
(India) B. Sai Praneeth	21	21
(Maldives) Mohamed Ajfan Rasheed	10	12
(Malaysia) Mohamad Arif Abdul Latif	18	19
6	(China) Wang Zhengming	21	21

Second round
(Indonesia) Shesar Hiren Rhustavito	21	21
14	(Thailand) Tanongsak Saensomboonsuk	17	11
(India) B. Sai Praneeth	15	16	6
(China) Wang Zhengming	21	21

Third round
(Indonesia) Shesar Hiren Rhustavito	9	17
6	(China) Wang Zhengming	21	21

==== Section 6 ====
First round
(Japan) Kazumasa Sakai	22	21
(Malaysia) Iskandar Zulkarnain Zainuddin	20	15
Q3	(Cambodia) Cheng Phorrom	16	8
16	(Chinese Taipei) Hsu Jen-hao	21	21
(Vietnam) Đỗ Tuấn Đức	12	6
(China) Lin Dan	21	21
(Thailand) Pisit Poodchalat	19	21	10
3	(Hong Kong) Hu Yun	21	9	21

Second round
(Japan) Kazumasa Sakai	21	21
16	(Chinese Taipei) Hsu Jen-hao	7	16
(China) Lin Dan	10	21	23
3	(Hong Kong) Hu Yun	21	7	21

Third round
(Japan) Kazumasa Sakai	16	15
(China) Lin Dan	21	21

==== Section 7 ====
First round
(Chinese Taipei) Hsueh Hsuan-yi	21	21
(Philippines) Mark Alcala	16	13
PFQ	(Mongolia) Batdavaa Munkhbat	16	2
12	(Japan) Takuma Ueda	21	21
Q1	(Mongolia) Enkhmandakh Purevsuren	5	3
(Singapore) Derek Wong Zi Liang	21	21
(Hong Kong) Chan Yan Kit	21	21
5	(Vietnam) Nguyen Tien Minh	16	11

Second round
(Chinese Taipei) Hsueh Hsuan-yi	21	21
12	(Japan) Takuma Ueda	16	18
(Singapore) Derek Wong Zi Liang	19	21	18
(Hong Kong) Chan Yan Kit	21	15	21

Third round
(Chinese Taipei) Hsueh Hsuan-yi	16	19
(Hong Kong) Chan Yan Kit	21	21

==== Section 8 ====
First round
(Indonesia) Ihsan Maulana Mustofa	21	20	10
(South Korea) Park Sung-min	17	22	21
(Hong Kong) Tam Chun Hei	13	8
9	(Malaysia) Liew Daren	21	21
(Thailand) Suppanyu Avihingsanon	22	21
Q7	(South Korea) Hwang Jong-soo	20	18
(Chinese Taipei) Shao Wen-hsu	17	16
2	(China) Du Pengyu	21	21

Second round
(South Korea) Park Sung-min	21	17	16
9	(Malaysia) Liew Daren	19	21	21
(Thailand) Suppanyu Avihingsanon	21	18	13
2	(China) Du Pengyu	19	21	21

Third round
9	(Malaysia) Liew Daren	24	19
2	(China) Du Pengyu	26	21

== Women's singles ==
=== Seeds ===
1. (China) Li Xuerui (final)
2. (China) Wang Yihan (champion)
3. (China) Wang Shixian (2nd Round)
4. (Thailand) Ratchanok Intanon (quarter-final)
5. (Chinese Taipei) Tai Tzu-ying (quarter-final)
6. (South Korea) Bae Yeon-ju (2nd Round)
7. (Japan) Eriko Hirose (semi-final)
8. (China) Jiang Yanjiao (2nd Round)

=== Finals ===
Semifinals
1	(China) Li Xuerui	21	18	21
(Japan) Sayaka Takahashi	18	21	12
7	(Japan) Eriko Hirose	12	6
2	(China) Wang Yihan	21	21

Final
1	(China) Li Xuerui	15	13
2	(China) Wang Yihan	21	21

=== Top half ===
First round
1	(China) Li XR	21	21
Q	(China) Sun Yu	15	18
(Indonesia) M F Kusumastuti	17	17
(Thailand) S Taerattanachai	21	21
6	(South Korea) Bae Y-j	22	21
(Chinese Taipei) Pai H-m	20	18
(Singapore) Xing AY	11	21	18
(Malaysia) S S Y Cheah	21	14	21
4	(Thailand) R Intanon	22	21
(Malaysia) Tee J Y	20	15
(Chinese Taipei) Cheng S-c	11	13
(Indonesia) B Manuputi	21	21
8	(China) Jiang YJ	21	21
(Hong Kong) Yip P Y	19	14
(Japan) S Takahashi	21	21	22
Q	(Chinese Taipei) Hsu Y-c	23	14	20

Second round
1	(China) Li XR	21	17	21
(Thailand) S Taerattanachai	17	21	10
6	(South Korea) Bae Y-j	18	26	16
(Malaysia) S S Y Cheah	21	24	21
4	(Thailand) R Intanon	21	21
(Indonesia) B Manuputi	13	16
8	(China) Jiang YJ	18	19
(Japan) S Takahashi	21	21

Quarterfinals
1	(China) Li XR	21	21
(Malaysia) S S Y Cheah	13	7
4	(Thailand) R Intanon	18	23	21
(Japan) S Takahashi	21	21	23

Semifinals
1	(China) Li XR	21	18	21
(Japan) S Takahashi	18	21	12

=== Bottom half ===
First round
(Indonesia) A Yuswandari	10	21	22
(Thailand) B Ongbumrungpan	21	8	24
Q	(Japan) A Ohori	18	10
7	(Japan) E Hirose	21	21
(Hong Kong) Chan T K	18	19
(India) P. V. Sindhu	21	21
(Singapore) Gu J	10	19
3	(China) Wang SX	21	21
(Singapore) Chen JY	8	19
(China) Han L	21	21
(Malaysia) L L Y Cheah	16	21	9
5	(Chinese Taipei) Tai T-y	21	13	21
Q	(Vietnam) Vu T T	18	9
(Thailand) N Jindapon	21	21
(Indonesia) H Desi	21	16	15
2	(China) Wang YH	17	21	21

Second round
(Thailand) B Ongbumrungpan	13	15
7	(Japan) E Hirose	21	21
(India) P. V. Sindhu	15	21	22
3	(China) Wang SX	21	14	20
(China) Han Li	21	12	10
5	(Chinese Taipei) Tai T-y	19	21	21
(Thailand) N Jindapon	21	16	16
2	(China) Wang YH	21	16	21

Quarterfinals
7	(Japan) E Hirose	21	16	21
(India) P. V. Sindhu	19	21	11
5	(Chinese Taipei) Tai T-y	21	18	10
2	(China) Wang YH	19	21	21

Semifinals
7	(Japan) E Hirose	12	6
2	(China) Wang YH	21	21

== Men's doubles ==
=== Seeds ===
1. (South Korea) Ko Sung-hyun / Lee Yong-dae (champion)
2. (Japan) Hiroyuki Endo / Kenichi Hayakawa (semi-final)
3. (South Korea) Kim Ki-jung / Kim Sa-rang (final)
4. (China) Hong Wei / Shen Ye (quarter-final)
5. (China) Chai Biao / Guo Zhendong (2nd Round)
6. (Indonesia) Mohammad Ahsan / Hendra Setiawan (withdrew)
7. (China) Liu Xiaolong / Qiu Zihan (quarter-final)
8. (Japan) Hirokatsu Hashimoto / Noriyasu Hirata (2nd Round)

=== Finals ===
Semifinals
1	(South Korea) Ko Sung-hyun (South Korea) Lee Yong-dae	21	21
(Malaysia) Goh V Shem (Malaysia) Lim Khim Wah	17	16
3	(South Korea) Kim Ki-jung (South Korea) Kim Sa-rang	19	21	21
4	(Japan) Hiroyuki Endo (Japan) Kenichi Hayakawa	21	13	14

Final
1	(South Korea) Ko Sung-hyun (South Korea) Lee Yong-dae	21	22
3	(South Korea) Kim Ki-jung (South Korea) Kim Sa-rang	13	20

=== Top half ===
First round
1	(South Korea) Ko S-h (South Korea) Lee Y-d	21	21
(Chinese Taipei) Lee S-m (Chinese Taipei) Tsai C-h	17	14
(Hong Kong) Chan T K (Hong Kong) Lo L K	21	21
Q	(Philippines) A Babad (Philippines) G Sibayan	16	10
PFQ	(Chinese Taipei) Huang C-e (Chinese Taipei) Lin C-y	21	18	22
(Philippines) P G Magnaye (Philippines) P J Vivas	15	21	20
(Malaysia) Ong J G (Malaysia) Teo K S	21	19	12
(Japan) T Kamura (Japan) K Sonoda	16	21	21
4	(China) Hong W (China) Shen Y
(Thailand) S Anugritayawon (Thailand) P Poodchalat	w	/	o
(India) T Kona (India) A Vishnu	24	19	16
Q	(Vietnam) Duong B D (Vietnam) Nguyen H N	22	21	21
8	(Japan) H Hashimoto (Japan) N Hirata	21	21	21
(Indonesia) A Y Chandra (Indonesia) M Kido	8	23	11
(Malaysia) Goh V S (Malaysia) Lim K W	21	21
(Chinese Taipei) Liang J-w (Chinese Taipei) Liao K-h	11	10

Second round
1	(South Korea) Ko S-h (South Korea) Lee Y-d	21	21
(Hong Kong) Chan T K (Hong Kong) Lo L K	10	11
PFQ	(Chinese Taipei) Huang C-e (Chinese Taipei) Lin C-y	14	14
(Japan) T Kamura (Japan) K Sonoda	21	21
4	(China) Hong W (China) Shen Y	21	21
Q	(Vietnam) Duong B D (Vietnam) Nguyen H N	7	8
8	(Japan) H Hashimoto (Japan) N Hirata	17	21	17
(Malaysia) Goh V S (Malaysia) Lim K W	21	19	21

Quarterfinals
1	(South Korea) Ko S-h (South Korea) Lee Y-d	21	21
(Japan) T Kamura (Japan) K Sonoda	14	17
4	(China) Hong W (China) Shen Y	14	21	13
(Malaysia) Goh V S (Malaysia) Lim K W	21	19	21

Semifinals
1	(South Korea) Ko S-h (South Korea) Lee Y-d	21	21
(Malaysia) Goh V S (Malaysia) Lim K W	17	16

=== Bottom half ===
First round
(Thailand) M Jongjit (Thailand) N Phuangphuapet	16	21	21
(Indonesia) Y S Dasuki (Indonesia) H A Gunawan	21	13	11
Q	(Hong Kong) Chan Y L (Hong Kong) Wong W H	12	12
5	(China) Chai B (China) Guo Z	21	21
(Chinese Taipei) Chen H-l (Chinese Taipei) Lu C-p	21	21
(India) P J Chopra (India) A Dewalkar	17	17
(Singapore) D B Chrisnanta (Singapore) Liu Y	19	12
3	(South Korea) Kim K-j (South Korea) Kim S-r	21	21
Q	(Singapore) T Hee (Singapore) T Yeo	17	21	11
(Malaysia) N K H Wei (Malaysia) Teo E Y	21	13	21
(India) M Attri (India) B S Reddy	18	9
7	(China) Liu XL (China) Qiu ZH	21	21
(Hong Kong) Lee C H (Hong Kong) Ng K L	21	14	19
(South Korea) Kim D-e (South Korea) Shin B-c	19	21	21
(Philippines) P J Escueta (Philippines) R Estanislao	13	5
2	(Japan) H Endo (Japan) K Hayakawa	21	21

Second round
(Thailand) M Jongjit (Thailand) N Phuangphuapet	21	21
5	(China) Chai B (China) Guo Z	14	17
(Chinese Taipei) Chen H-l (Chinese Taipei) Lu C-p	13	25	11
3	(South Korea) Kim K-j (South Korea) Kim S-r	21	23	21
(Malaysia) N K H Wei (Malaysia) Teo E Y	21	21	17
7	(China) Liu XL (China) Qiu ZH	17	23	21
(South Korea) Kim D-e (South Korea) Shin B-c	10	18
2	(Japan) H Endo (Japan) K Hayakawa	21	21

Quarterfinals
(Thailand) M Jongjit (Thailand) N Phuangphuapet	16	23	17
3	(South Korea) Kim K-j (South Korea) Kim S-r	21	21	21
7	(China) Liu XL (China) Qiu ZH	17	13
2	(Japan) H Endo (Japan) K Hayakawa	21	21

Semifinals
3	(South Korea) Kim K-j (South Korea) Kim S-r	19	21	21
2	(Japan) H Endo (Japan) K Hayakawa	21	13	14

-->

== Women's doubles ==
=== Seeds ===
1. (China) Wang Xiaoli / Yu Yang (gold medalist)
2. (Japan) Misaki Matsutomo / Ayaka Takahashi (first round)
3. (South Korea) Jung Kyung-Eun / Kim Ha-Na (first round)
4. (Japan) Miyuki Maeda / Satoko Suetsuna (quarter-finals)
5. (China) Ma Jin / Tang Jinhua (silver medalist)
6. (Thailand) Duanganong Aroonkesorn / Kunchala Voravichitchaikul (first round)
7. (Indonesia) Pia Zebadiah Bernadet / Rizki Amelia Pradipta (withdrew)
8. (Thailand) Lam Narissapat / Saralee Thoungthongkam (first round)

=== Finals ===
Semifinals
1	(China) Wang Xiaoli (China) Yu Yang	21	21
(South Korea) Ko A-ra (South Korea) Yoo Hae-won	15	17
5	(China) Ma Jin (China) Tang Jinhua	21	21
(Indonesia) Gebby Ristiyani Imawan (Indonesia) Tiara Rosalia Nuraidah	18	8

Final
1	(China) Wang Xiaoli (China) Yu Yang	21	14	21
5	(China) Ma Jin (China) Tang Jinhua	15	21	15

=== Top half ===
==== Section 1 ====
First round
1	(China) Wang XL (China) Yu Y	21	21
(Japan) M Aratama (Japan) M Taruno	9	7
(Hong Kong) Chau HW (Hong Kong) Shek HY	21	21
PFQ	(Hong Kong) Chan HY (Hong Kong) Yuen SY	19	17
6	(Thailand) D Aroonkesorn (Thailand) K Voravichitchaikul	17	21	10
(South Korea) Lee S-H (South Korea) Shin S-C	21	13	21
(Chinese Taipei) Chiang K-H (Chinese Taipei) Tsai P-L	21	21
Q4	(Sri Lanka) R Hettiarachchige (Sri Lanka) K Sirimannage	4	10

Second round
1	(China) Wang XL (China) Yu Y	21	21
(Hong Kong) Chau HW (Hong Kong) Shek HY	14	19
(South Korea) Lee S-H (South Korea) Shin S-C	21	21
(Chinese Taipei) Chiang K-H (Chinese Taipei) Tsai P-L	12	13

Quarterfinals
1	(China) Wang XL (China) Yu Y	21	21
(South Korea) Lee S-H (South Korea) Shin S-C	5	19

==== Section 2 ====
First round
4	(Japan) M Maeda (Japan) S Suetsuna	21	21
(Singapore) V Neo (Singapore) Yao L	18	15
(India) A Balan (India) S Reddy	16	17
(Chinese Taipei) Chen H-H (Chinese Taipei) Lai C-W	21	21
PFQ	(Vietnam) Nguyen TS (Vietnam) Vu TT	13	13
(Chinese Taipei) Chen W-H (Chinese Taipei) Hsieh P-C	21	21
Q3	(Macau) Ieong PS (Macau) Ng WC	4	2
(South Korea) Ko A-R (South Korea) Yoo H-W	21	21

Second round
4	(Japan) M Maeda (Japan) S Suetsuna	21	21
(Chinese Taipei) Chen H-H (Chinese Taipei) Lai C-W	9	18
(Chinese Taipei) Chen W-H (Chinese Taipei) Hsieh P-C	19	21	18
(South Korea) Ko A-R (South Korea) Yoo H-W	21	15	21

Quarterfinals
4	(Japan) M Maeda (Japan) S Suetsuna	18	15
(South Korea) Ko A-R (South Korea) Yoo H-W	21	21

=== Bottom half ===
==== Section 3 ====
First round
(Singapore) Fu MT (Singapore) S Sari	20	21	17
(Chinese Taipei) Chien Y-C (Chinese Taipei) Wu T-J	22	14	21
PFQ	(Philippines) A Leonardo (Philippines) T Pomar	8	9
5	(China) Ma J (China) Tang JH	21	21
(Malaysia) A Anscelly (Malaysia) Soong FC	21	21
Q2	(Philippines) J Francisco (Philippines) E Inlayo	10	8
(Indonesia) S Andini (Indonesia) D Haris	12	21	21
3	(South Korea) Jung K-E (South Korea) Kim H-N	21	19	9

Second round
(Chinese Taipei) Chien Y-C (Chinese Taipei) Wu T-J	9	7
5	(China) Ma J (China) Tang JH	21	21
(Malaysia) A Anscelly (Malaysia) Soong FC	21	21
(Indonesia) S Andini (Indonesia) D Haris	19	17

Quarterfinals
5	(China) Ma J (China) Tang JH	21	21
(Malaysia) A Anscelly (Malaysia) Soong FC	14	10

==== Section 4 ====
First round
Q1	(Uzbekistan) A Smirnova (Uzbekistan) M Pakina	7	5
(China) Bao YX (China) Tian Q	21	21
(Indonesia) G Imawan (Indonesia) T Nuraidah	21	21
8	(Thailand) L Narissapat (Thailand) S Thoungthongkam	19	19
(India) P Gadre (India) A Ponnappa	21	30
(Chinese Taipei) Wang P-R (Chinese Taipei) Wen K-Y	12	29
(Hong Kong) Poon LY (Hong Kong) Tse YS	10	21	21
2	(Japan) M Matsutomo (Japan) A Takahashi	21	11	13

Second round
(China) Bao YX (China) Tian Q	24	23	13
(Indonesia) G Imawan (Indonesia) T Nuraidah	26	21	21
(India) P Gadre (India) A Ponnappa	15	11
(Hong Kong) Poon LY (Hong Kong) Tse YS	21	21

Quarterfinals
(Indonesia) G Imawan (Indonesia) T Nuraidah	18	21	21
(Hong Kong) Poon LY (Hong Kong) Tse YS	21	12	16

== Mixed doubles ==
=== Seeds ===
1. (China) Xu Chen / Ma Jin (withdrew)
2. (China) Zhang Nan / Zhao Yunlei (silver medalist)
3. (Thailand) Sudket Prapakamol / Saralee Thoungthongkam (quarter-finals)
4. (Indonesia) Markis Kido / Pia Zebadiah Bernadet (second round)
5. (Indonesia) Fran Kurniawan / Shendy Puspa Irawati (bronze medalist)
6. (Singapore) Danny Bawa Chrisnanta / Vanessa Neo Yu Yan (first round)
7. (Japan) Kenichi Hayakawa / Misaki Matsutomo (first round)
8. (India) Valiyaveetil Diju / Jwala Gutta (withdrew)

=== Finals ===
Semifinals
(South Korea) Ko Sung-hyun (South Korea) Kim Ha-na	23	21
(Indonesia) Fran Kurniawan (Indonesia) Shendy Puspa Irawati	21	15
(Hong Kong) Lee Chun Hei (Hong Kong) Chau Hoi Wah	16	11
2	(China) Zhang Nan (China) Zhao Yunlei	21	21

Final
(South Korea) Ko Sung-hyun (South Korea) Kim Ha-na	22	21
2	(China) Zhang Nan (China) Zhao Yunlei	20	17

=== Top half ===
==== Section 1 ====
First round
PFQ	(Malaysia) Wong FY (Malaysia) Lai SJ	14	19
(Chinese Taipei) Liao M-C (Chinese Taipei) Chen H-H	21	21
(Indonesia) E Subaktiar (Indonesia) G Widjaja	20	21	12
(South Korea) Ko S-H (South Korea) Kim H-N	22	14	21
7	(Japan) K Hayakawa (Japan) M Matsutomo	21	18	17
Q3	(Malaysia) Teo EY (Malaysia) A Anscelly	16	21	21
(Singapore) Liu Y (Singapore) Yao L	21	16	21
(India) T Kona (India) A Ponnappa	14	21	18

Second round
(Chinese Taipei) Liao M-C (Chinese Taipei) Chen H-H	15	19
(South Korea) Ko S-H (South Korea) Kim H-N	21	21
Q3	(Malaysia) Teo EY (Malaysia) A Anscelly	21	21
(Singapore) Liu Y (Singapore) Yao L	16	18

Quarterfinals
(South Korea) Ko S-H (South Korea) Kim H-N	21	21
Q3	(Malaysia) Teo EY (Malaysia) A Anscelly	12	10

==== Section 2 ====
First round
3	(Thailand) S Prapakamol (Thailand) S Thoungthongkam	21	21
(South Korea) Kim D-E (South Korea) Kim S-Y	16	12
(China) Qiu ZH (China) Bao YX	19	15
(Malaysia) Tan AQ (Malaysia) Lai PJ	21	21
5	(Indonesia) F Kurniawan (Indonesia) S Irawati	18	23	21
(Hong Kong) Chan YL (Hong Kong) Tse YS	21	21	17
Q4	(Chinese Taipei) Lee S-M (Chinese Taipei) Chen W-H	21	14	21
(India) A Vishnu (India) A Balan	16	21	14

Second round
3	(Thailand) S Prapakamol (Thailand) S Thoungthongkam	21	21
(Malaysia) Tan AQ (Malaysia) Lai PJ	17	5
5	(Indonesia) F Kurniawan (Indonesia) S Irawati	21	21
Q4	(Chinese Taipei) Lee S-M (Chinese Taipei) Chen W-H	15	12

Quarterfinals
3	(Thailand) S Prapakamol (Thailand) S Thoungthongkam	21	15	11
5	(Indonesia) F Kurniawan (Indonesia) S Irawati	19	21	21

=== Bottom half ===
==== Section 3 ====
First round
PFQ	(Hong Kong) Wong WH (Hong Kong) Chan HY	18	8
(Japan) H Hashimoto (Japan) M Maeda	21	21
(Hong Kong) Lee CH (Hong Kong) Chau HW	21	23
6	(Singapore) D Chrisnanta (Singapore) V Neo	9	21
(China) Hong W (China) Tang JH	21	21
Q2	(Chinese Taipei) Chen H-L (Chinese Taipei) Chien Y-C	14	17
(India) A Dewalkar (India) P Gadre	10	12
4	(Indonesia) M Kido (Indonesia) P Z Bernadet	21	21

Second round
(Japan) H Hashimoto (Japan) M Maeda	15	17
(Hong Kong) Lee CH (Hong Kong) Chau HW	21	21
(China) Hong W (China) Tang JH	18	21	22
4	(Indonesia) M Kido (Indonesia) P Z Bernadet	21	16	20

Quarterfinals
(Hong Kong) Lee CH (Hong Kong) Chau HW	17	21	21
(China) Hong W (China) Tang JH	21	18	10

==== Section 4 ====
First round
Q1	(Chinese Taipei) Wang C-M (Chinese Taipei) Hsieh P-C	19	9
(South Korea) Shin B-C (South Korea) Jang Y-N	21	21
(Indonesia) L Nugroho (Indonesia) A Saufika	21	22
PFQ	(Chinese Taipei) Lu C-Y (Chinese Taipei) Lai C-W	18	20
(Chinese Taipei) Lin Y-J (Chinese Taipei) Wu T-J	13	17
(Malaysia) Ong JG (Malaysia) Lim YL	21	21
(Thailand) S Anugritayawon (Thailand) K Voravichitchaikul	WO
2	(China) Zhang N (China) Zhao YL

Second round
(South Korea) Shin B-C (South Korea) Jang Y-N	21	21
(Indonesia) L Nugroho (Indonesia) A Saufika	15	12
(Malaysia) Ong JG (Malaysia) Lim YL	13	16
2	(China) Zhang N (China) Zhao YL	21	21

Quarterfinals
(South Korea) Shin B-C (South Korea) Jang Y-N	12	15
2	(China) Zhang N (China) Zhao YL	21	21

== See also ==
- List of sporting events in Taiwan
