= Wang Xin =

Wang Xin may refer to:

- Wang Xin (actress) (born 1979), Singaporean actress
- Wang Xin (artist) (born 1983), Chinese artist
- Wang Xin (badminton) (born 1985), Chinese female badminton player
- Wang Xin (diver) (born 1992), Chinese female diver
- Wang Xin (judoka) (born 1995), Chinese judoka
