= Hirokatsu Hashimoto =

Japanese badminton player (born 1985)

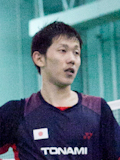
- Hashimoto in 2011

Personal information
- Born: 18 December 1985 (age 40) Kumamoto Prefecture, Japan
- Height: 1.78 m (5 ft 10 in)
- Weight: 75 kg (165 lb)

Sport
- Country: Japan
- Sport: Badminton
- Handedness: Right

Men's & mixed doubles
- Highest ranking: 7 (MD 26 April 2012); 15 (XD 16 September 2010)
- BWF profile
Medal record
Men's badminton
Representing Japan
Sudirman Cup
Silver medal – second place	2015 Dongguan	Mixed team
Thomas Cup
Gold medal – first place	2014 New Delhi	Men's team
Bronze medal – third place	2010 Kuala Lumpur	Men's team
Bronze medal – third place	2012 Wuhan	Men's team
Asian Championships
Silver medal – second place	2011 Chengdu	Men's doubles
East Asian Games
Bronze medal – third place	2009 Hong Kong	Men's team

Hirokatsu Hashimoto (橋本 博且, Hashimoto Hirokatsu; born 18 December 1985) is a former Japanese badminton player who competed in doubles. He is best known for his men's doubles partnership with Noriyasu Hirata. In 2011, Hashimoto and Hirata won the India Open, making history as the first Japanese male players to ever capture a BWF Super Series title. Among his other major international achievements, Hashimoto won a gold medal at the 2014 Thomas Cup with the Japanese men's national team and competed at the 2010 and 2014 Asian Games.

== Career ==
In 2011, Hashimoto and his men's doubles partner Noriyasu Hirata won the India Open, making history as the first Japanese male players to capture a BWF Super Series title.

After concluding his playing career with Tonami Transportation and the Fukui Prefectural Sports Association, Hashimoto transitioned into coaching. Since 2019, he has served as a coach for the Saishunkan Pharmaceutical badminton team.

== Achievements ==
=== Asian Championships ===
Men's doubles
Year	Venue	Partner	Opponent	Score	Result	Ref.
2011	Sichuan Gymnasium; Chengdu, China	(Japan) Noriyasu Hirata	(China) Cai Yun (China) Fu Haifeng	12–21, 15–21	Silver	

=== BWF World Tour ===
The BWF World Tour, which was announced on 19 March 2017 and implemented in 2018, is a series of elite badminton tournaments sanctioned by the Badminton World Federation (BWF). The BWF World Tours are divided into levels of World Tour Finals, Super 1000, Super 750, Super 500, Super 300, and the BWF Tour Super 100.

Men's doubles
Year	Tournament	Level	Partner	Opponent	Score	Result	Ref.
2018	Akita Masters	Super 100	(Japan) Hiroyuki Saeki	(Indonesia) Akbar Bintang Cahyono (Indonesia) Muhammad Reza Pahlevi Isfahani	16–21, 6–21	(silver) Runner-up	

=== BWF Superseries ===
The BWF Superseries, which was launched on 14 December 2006 and implemented in 2007, was a series of elite badminton tournaments, sanctioned by the Badminton World Federation (BWF). BWF Superseries levels were Superseries and Superseries Premier. A season of Superseries consisted of twelve tournaments around the world that had been introduced since 2011. Successful players were invited to the Superseries Finals, which were held at the end of each year.

Men's doubles
Year	Tournament	Partner	Opponent	Score	Result	Ref.
2011	India Open	(Japan) Noriyasu Hirata	(Indonesia) Angga Pratama (Indonesia) Rian Agung Saputro	21–17, 21–9	(gold) Winner	

BWF Super Series tournament

=== BWF Grand Prix ===
The BWF Grand Prix had two levels, the Grand Prix and Grand Prix Gold. It was a series of badminton tournaments sanctioned by the Badminton World Federation (BWF) and played between 2007 and 2017.

Men's doubles
Year	Tournament	Partner	Opponent	Score	Result	Ref.
2009	New Zealand Open	(Japan) Noriyasu Hirata	(India) Rupesh Kumar K. T. (India) Sanave Thomas	16–21, 21–15, 13–21	(silver) Runner-up	
2010	Dutch Open	(Japan) Noriyasu Hirata	(Japan) Yoshiteru Hirobe (Japan) Kenta Kazuno	21–17, 21–13	(gold) Winner	

Mixed doubles
Year	Tournament	Partner	Opponent	Score	Result	Ref.
2011	Australian Open	(Japan) Mizuki Fujii	(Thailand) Songphon Anugritayawon (Thailand) Kunchala Voravichitchaikul	15–21, 9–21	(silver) Runner-up	

BWF Grand Prix Gold tournament
BWF Grand Prix tournament

=== BWF International Challenge/Series ===
Men's doubles
Year	Tournament	Partner	Opponent	Score	Result	Ref.
2009	Osaka International	(Japan) Noriyasu Hirata	(Japan) Yoshiteru Hirobe (Japan) Hajime Komiyama	19–21, 10–21	(silver) Runner-up	
2010	Osaka International	(Japan) Noriyasu Hirata	(Japan) Hiroyuki Endo (Japan) Yoshiteru Hirobe	16–21, 23–21, 21–17	(gold) Winner	
2018	Osaka International	(Japan) Hiroyuki Saeki	(Malaysia) Mohamad Arif Abdul Latif (Malaysia) Nur Mohd Azriyn Ayub	21–19, 15–21, 21–15	(gold) Winner	

Mixed doubles
Year	Tournament	Partner	Opponent	Score	Result	Ref.
2010	Osaka International	(Japan) Mizuki Fujii	(Japan) Kenichi Hayakawa (Japan) Shizuka Matsuo	14–21, 11–21	(silver) Runner-up	

BWF International Challenge tournament
