= Du Pengyu =

Chinese badminton player (born 1988)

Du Pengyu 杜鹏宇
Personal information
- Born: 22 January 1988 (age 38) Baoding, Hebei, China
- Height: 1.80 m (5 ft 11 in)

Sport
- Country: China
- Sport: Badminton

Men's singles
- Career record: 140 wins, 70 losses
- Highest ranking: 3 (23 January 2013)
- BWF profile
Medal record
Men's badminton
Representing China
World Championships
Bronze medal – third place	2013 Guangzhou	Men's singles
Thomas Cup
Gold medal – first place	2012 Wuhan	Men's team
Bronze medal – third place	2014 New Delhi	Men's team
Asian Championships
Gold medal – first place	2013 Taipei	Men's singles
Silver medal – second place	2012 Qingdao	Men's singles
Bronze medal – third place	2009 Suwon	Men's singles
Bronze medal – third place	2011 Chengdu	Men's singles
East Asian Games
Gold medal – first place	2009 Hong Kong	Men's team
Gold medal – first place	2013 Tianjin	Men's singles
Gold medal – first place	2013 Tianjin	Men's team
Asian Junior Championships
Silver medal – second place	2005 Jakarta	Boys' team
Bronze medal – third place	2006 Kuala Lumpur	Mixed team

Du Pengyu
- Traditional Chinese: 杜鵬宇
- Simplified Chinese: 杜鹏宇
Transcriptions
Standard Mandarin
- Hanyu Pinyin: Dù Péngyǔ

Du Pengyu (born 22 January 1988) is a Chinese former badminton player. Du specializes in men's singles where he has distinguished himself as one of China's top ranked male players. His earliest major success came at the 2010 Swiss Open Super Series where he reached the semifinals.

== Achievements ==
=== BWF World Championships ===
Men's singles
Year	Venue	Opponent	Score	Result
2013	Tianhe Sports Center; Guangzhou, China	(Malaysia) Lee Chong Wei	22–20, 12–21, 15–21	Bronze

=== Asian Championships ===
Men's singles
Year	Venue	Opponent	Score	Result
2009	Suwon Indoor Stadium; Suwon, South Korea	(China) Chen Long	16–21, 26–28	Bronze
2011	Sichuan Gymnasium; Chengdu, China	(China) Lin Dan	13–21, 16–21	Bronze
2012	Qingdao Sports Centre Conson Stadium; Qingdao, China	(China) Chen Jin	12–21, 18–21	Silver
2013	Taipei Arena; Taipei, Chinese Taipei	(China) Chen Long	21–17, 21–19	Gold

=== East Asian Games ===
Men's singles
Year	Venue	Opponent	Score	Result
2013	Binhai New Area Dagang Gymnasium; Tianjin, China	(China) Wang Zhengming	22–20, 21–17	Gold

=== BWF Superseries ===
The BWF Superseries, launched on 14 December 2006 and implemented in 2007, is a series of elite badminton tournaments, sanctioned by Badminton World Federation (BWF). BWF Superseries has two level such as Superseries and Superseries Premier. A season of Superseries features twelve tournaments around the world, which introduced since 2011, with successful players invited to the Superseries Finals held at the year end.

Men's singles
Year	Tournament	Opponent	Score	Result
2012	Indonesia Open	(Indonesia) Simon Santoso	18–21, 21–13, 11–21	(silver) Runner-up
2012	Denmark Open	(Malaysia) Lee Chong Wei	21–15, 12–21, 19–21	(silver) Runner-up
2012	World Superseries Finals	(China) Chen Long	12–21, 13–21	(silver) Runner-up
2013	Korea Open	(Malaysia) Lee Chong Wei	12–21, 15–21	(silver) Runner-up

BWF Super Series Finals tournament
BWF Super Series Premier tournament
BWF Super Series tournament

=== BWF Grand Prix ===
The BWF Grand Prix has two level such as Grand Prix and Grand Prix Gold. It is a series of badminton tournaments, sanctioned by Badminton World Federation (BWF) since 2007.

Men's singles
Year	Tournament	Opponent	Score	Result
2011	Macau Open	(South Korea) Lee Hyun-il	21–17, 11–21, 18–21	(silver) Runner-up
2013	Swiss Open	(China) Wang Zhengming	18–21, 18–21	(silver) Runner-up

BWF Grand Prix Gold tournament
BWF Grand Prix tournament

== Performance timeline ==
=== Singles performance timeline ===
Key

W	Won	F	Finalist	SF	Semi-finalist
QF	Quarter-finalist	#R	Rounds 4, 3, 2, 1	RR	Round-robin stage
Q#	Qualification round	A	Absent	w/d	Withdrew
G	Gold	S	Silver	B	Bronze
NH	Not held	N/A	Not applicable	DNQ	Did not qualify

Tournament	2005	2006	2007	2008	2009	2010	2011	2012	2013	2014	SR	W–L	Win %
Summer Olympics	Not Held			A	Not Held			A	Not Held		0 / 0		
World Championships	Absent			NH	Absent		3R; 2–1	NH	SF-B; 4–1	A	0 / 2	6–2	75%
World Superseries Finals	Not Held			Absent		RR; 1–2	A	F 4–1	Absent		0 / 2	5–3	63%
Asian Championships	Absent				SF-B; 4–1	A	SF-B; 4–1	S 5–1	G 6–0	A	1 / 4	19–3	86%
Asian Games	NH	A	Not Held			A	Not Held			A	0 / 0		
East Asian Games	Not Held				A	Not Held			G 3–0	NH	1 / 1	3–0	100%
Team Competitions
Thomas Cup	NH	A	NH	A	NH	A	NH	G 1–0	NH	SF-B; 4–1	1 / 2	5–1	83%
Sudirman Cup	A	NH	A	NH	A	NH	A	NH	A	NH	0 / 0		
Asian Games	NH	A	Not Held			A	Not Held			A	0 / 0		
East Asian Games	Not Held				G 1–0	Not Held			G 4–0	NH	2 / 2	5–0	100%
BWF World Superseries Premier
Malaysia Open	Absent					2R; 1–1	1R; 0–1	1R; 0–1	A	QF; 2–1	0 / 4	3–4	43%
All England Open	Absent					1R; 0–1	2R; 1–1	1R; 0–1	1R; 0–1	1R; 0–1	0 / 5	1–5	17%
Indonesia Open	Absent						QF; 2–1	F 4–1	QF; 2–1	A	0 / 3	8–3	73%
Denmark Open	Absent					SF; 3–1	2R; 1–1	F 4–1	SF; 3–1	A	0 / 4	11–4	73%
China Open	2R; 1–1	A	1R; 3–1	QF; 4–1	QF; 2–1	SF; 3–1	2R; 1–1	1R; 0–1	QF; 2–1	A	0 / 8	16–8	67%
BWF World Superseries
Korea Open	Absent					2R; 1–1	SF; 3–1	SF; 3–1	F 4–1	QF; 2–1	0 / 5	13–5	72%
India Open	Not Held			A	1R; 0–1	Absent				SF; 3–1	0 / 2	3–2	60%
Singapore Open	Absent						QF; 2–1	1R; 0–1	2R; 1–1	SF; 3–1	0 / 4	6–4	60%
Japan Open	Absent					1R; 0–1	1R; 0–1	Absent			0 / 2	0–2	0%
Australian Open	Absent										0 / 0		
French Open	A	NH	Absent			QF; 2–1	2R; 1–1	1R; 0–1	Absent		0 / 3	3–3	50%
Hong Kong Open	Absent				SF; 3–1	1R; 0–1	2R; 1–1	1R; 0–1	1R; 0–1	A	0 / 5	4–5	44%
BWF Grand Prix Gold and Grand Prix
German Open	Absent				1R; 1–2	Absent					0 / 1	1–2	33%
Swiss Open	Absent					SF; 3–1	A	3R; 2–1	F 5–1	A	0 / 3	10–3	77%
Malaysia Open	Not Held				3R; 2–1	Absent					0 / 1	2–1	67%
China Masters	Absent		2R; 4–1	1R; 0–1	QF; 2–1	2R; 1–1	QF; 2–1	SF; 3–1	1R; 0–1	A	0 / 7	12–7	63%
Indonesia Open	Not Held					QF; 2–1	Absent				0 / 1	2–1	67%
Philippines Open	NH	Absent		NH	SF; 4–1	Not Held					0 / 1	4–1	80%
Macau Open	NH	Absent			3R; 2–1	A	F 5–1	Absent			0 / 2	7–2	78%
Career Statistics
	2005	2006	2007	2008	2009	2010	2011	2012	2013	2014			
Tournaments Played	1	0	2	2	10	12	14	14	13	6	74		
Titles	0	0	0	0	1	0	0	1	3	0	5		
Finals Reached	0	0	0	0	1	0	1	5	5	0	12		
Overall win–loss	1–1	0–0	7–2	4–2	21–10	17–13	25–14	26–13	34–10	14–6	149–71		
Win Percentage	50%	0%	78%	67%	68%	57%	64%	67%	77%	70%	67.73%		
Year End Ranking				165	32	12	11	5	7	38			

== Record against selected opponents ==
Record against year-end Finals finalists, World Championships semi finalists, and Olympic quarter finalists.

Player	Matches	Win	Lost	Diff.
(China) Bao Chunlai	2	1	1	0
(China) Chen Jin	3	0	3	–3
(China) Chen Long	9	4	5	–1
(China) Lin Dan	3	0	3	–3
(Chinese Taipei) Chou Tien-chen	4	3	1	+2
(Denmark) Viktor Axelsen	2	2	0	+2
(Denmark) Peter Gade	4	1	3	–2
(Denmark) Jan Ø. Jørgensen	5	3	2	+1
(Denmark) Hans-Kristian Vittinghus	4	4	0	+4
(England) Rajiv Ouseph	2	0	2	–2
(India) Parupalli Kashyap	2	2	0	+2
(India) B. Sai Praneeth	2	2	0	+2

Player	Matches	Win	Lost	Diff.
(Indonesia) Taufik Hidayat	6	1	5	–4
(Indonesia) Sony Dwi Kuncoro	5	2	3	–1
(Japan) Kento Momota	2	1	1	0
(Japan) Sho Sasaki	5	4	1	+3
(Malaysia) Lee Chong Wei	13	1	12	–11
(Malaysia) Liew Daren	4	4	0	+4
(South Korea) Lee Hyun-il	1	0	1	–1
(South Korea) Park Sung-hwan	2	1	1	0
(South Korea) Son Wan-ho	3	3	0	+3
(Thailand) Boonsak Ponsana	6	4	2	+2
(Vietnam) Nguyễn Tiến Minh	4	2	2	0
