= 2011 Badminton Asia Championships =

Badminton championships

Tournament information
- Location: Chengdu, China
- Dates: April 19–April 24

The 2011 Badminton Asia Championships was the 30th tournament of the Badminton Asia Championships. It was held in Chengdu, China from April 19 to April 24, 2011.

== Medalists ==
Event	Gold	Silver	Bronze
Men's singles	(China) Lin Dan	(China) Bao Chunlai	(China) Du Pengyu
Men's singles	(China) Lin Dan	(China) Bao Chunlai	(China) Chen Long
Women's singles	(China) Wang Yihan	(China) Lu Lan	(China) Jiang Yanjiao
Women's singles	(China) Wang Yihan	(China) Lu Lan	(Chinese Taipei) Cheng Shao-chieh
Men's doubles	(China) Cai Yun (China) Fu Haifeng	(Japan) Hirokatsu Hashimoto (Japan) Noriyasu Hirata	(China) Xu Chen (China) Zhang Nan
Men's doubles	(China) Cai Yun (China) Fu Haifeng	(Japan) Hirokatsu Hashimoto (Japan) Noriyasu Hirata	(China) Chai Biao (China) Guo Zhendong
Women's doubles	(China) Wang Xiaoli (China) Yu Yang	(China) Tian Qing (China) Zhao Yunlei	(South Korea) Ha Jung-eun (South Korea) Kim Min-jung
Women's doubles	(China) Wang Xiaoli (China) Yu Yang	(China) Tian Qing (China) Zhao Yunlei	(China) Bao Yixin (China) Zhong Qianxin
Mixed doubles	(China) Zhang Nan (China) Zhao Yunlei	(China) Xu Chen (China) Ma Jin	(China) Hong Wei (China) Pan Pan
Mixed doubles	(China) Zhang Nan (China) Zhao Yunlei	(China) Xu Chen (China) Ma Jin	(Thailand) Sudket Prapakamol (Thailand) Saralee Thungthongkam

== Final results ==
=== Men's singles ===
Semi-finals
1	(China) Lin Dan	21	21
6	(China) Du Pengyu	13	16
7	(China) Bao Chunlai	21	21
2	(China) Chen Long	12	13

Final
1	(China) Lin Dan	21	21
7	(China) Bao Chunlai	19	13

=== Women's singles ===
Semi-finals
(China) Lu Lan	21	25
6	(China) Jiang Yanjiao	18	23
(Chinese Taipei) Cheng Shao-chieh	19	21
2	(China) Wang Yihan	21	23

Final
(China) Lu Lan	15	21
2	(China) Wang Yihan	21	23

=== Men's doubles ===
Semi-finals
1	(China) Cai Yun (China) Fu Haifeng	21	21
6	(China) Xu Chen (China) Zhang Nan	19	15
5	(China) Chai Biao (China) Guo Zhendong	14	19
8	(Japan) Hirokatsu Hashimoto (Japan) Noriyasu Hirata	21	21

Final
1	(China) Cai Yun (China) Fu Haifeng	21	21
8	(Japan) Hirokatsu Hashimoto (Japan) Noriyasu Hirata	12	15

=== Women's doubles ===
Semi-finals
6	(China) Tian Qing (China) Zhao Yunlei	21	19	21
5	(South Korea) Ha Jung-eun (South Korea) Kim Min-jung	15	21	17
8	(China) Bao Yixin (China) Zhong Qianxin	17	19
2	(China) Wang Xiaoli (China) Yu Yang	21	21

Final
6	(China) Tian Qing (China) Zhao Yunlei	13	10
2	(China) Wang Xiaoli (China) Yu Yang	21	21

=== Mixed doubles ===
Semi-finals
1	(China) Zhang Nan (China) Zhao Yunlei	21	21
(China) Hong Wei (China) Pan Pan	15	11
8	(China) Xu Chen (China) Ma Jin	21	21
2	(Thailand) Sudket Prapakamol (Thailand) Saralee Thoungthongkam	17	15

Final
1	(China) Zhang Nan (China) Zhao Yunlei	15	21	25
8	(China) Xu Chen (China) Ma Jin	21	15	23

== Medal table ==
Rank	Nation	Gold	Silver	Bronze	Total
1	China	5	4	7	16
2	Japan	0	1	0	1
3	Chinese Taipei	0	0	1	1
3	South Korea	0	0	1	1
3	Thailand	0	0	1	1
Totals (5 entries)		5	5	10	20
