= 2009 Badminton Asia Championships =

Badminton championships

Tournament information
- Location: Suwon, South Korea
- Dates: 7 April–12 April

The 2009 Badminton Asia Championships is the 28th tournament of the Badminton Asia Championships. It was held in Suwon, South Korea from 7 to 12 April 2009.

== Venue ==
- Suwon Indoor Stadium.

== Medalists ==
Event	Gold	Silver	Bronze
Men's singles	(China) Bao Chunlai	(China) Chen Long	(China) Du Pengyu
Men's singles	(China) Bao Chunlai	(China) Chen Long	(Japan) Sho Sasaki
Women's singles	(China) Zhu Lin	(China) Xie Xingfang	(China) Wang Lin
Women's singles	(China) Zhu Lin	(China) Xie Xingfang	(China) Wang Yihan
Men's doubles	(Indonesia) Markis Kido (Indonesia) Hendra Setiawan	(South Korea) Ko Sung-hyun (South Korea) Yoo Yeon-seong	(China) Chai Biao (China) Liu Xiaolong
Men's doubles	(Indonesia) Markis Kido (Indonesia) Hendra Setiawan	(South Korea) Ko Sung-hyun (South Korea) Yoo Yeon-seong	(South Korea) Han Sang-hoon (South Korea) Hwang Ji-man
Women's doubles	(China) Ma Jin (China) Wang Xiaoli	(South Korea) Lee Hyo-jung (South Korea) Lee Kyung-won	(Chinese Taipei) Cheng Wen-hsing (Chinese Taipei) Chien Yu-chin
Women's doubles	(China) Ma Jin (China) Wang Xiaoli	(South Korea) Lee Hyo-jung (South Korea) Lee Kyung-won	(China) Yang Wei (China) Zhang Jiewen
Mixed doubles	(South Korea) Lee Yong-dae (South Korea) Lee Hyo-jung	(South Korea) Yoo Yeon-seong (South Korea) Kim Min-jung	(China) Tao Jiaming (China) Ma Jin
Mixed doubles	(South Korea) Lee Yong-dae (South Korea) Lee Hyo-jung	(South Korea) Yoo Yeon-seong (South Korea) Kim Min-jung	(Japan) Noriyasu Hirata (Japan) Miyuki Maeda

== Medal count ==
Pos	Country	Gold	Silver	Bronze	Total
1	China	3	2	6	11
2	South Korea	1	3	1	5
3	Indonesia	1	0	0	1
4	Japan	0	0	2	2
5	Chinese Taipei	0	0	1	1

== Final results ==
=== Men's singles ===
Semi-finals
(China) Du Pengyu	16	26
(China) Chen Long	21	28
4	(China) Bao Chunlai	22	21
9	(Japan) Sho Sasaki	20	10

Final
(China) Chen Long	21	10	16
4	(China) Bao Chunlai	16	21	21

=== Women's singles ===
Semi-finals
6	(China) Zhu Lin	21	21
3	(China) Wang Lin	12	16
8	(China) Wang Yihan	18	21	12
5	(China) Xie Xingfang	21	19	21

Final
6	(China) Zhu Lin	21	21
5	(China) Xie Xingfang	11	10

=== Men's doubles ===
Semi-finals
1	(Indonesia) Markis Kido (Indonesia) Hendra Setiawan	21	21
6	(China) Chai Biao (China) Liu Xiaolong	17	15
(South Korea) Han Sang-hoon (South Korea) Hwang Ji-man	21	15	16
8	(South Korea) Ko Sung-hyun (South Korea) Yoo Yeon-seong	19	21	21

Final
1	(Indonesia) Markis Kido (Indonesia) Hendra Setiawan	21	26
8	(South Korea) Ko Sung-hyun (South Korea) Yoo Yeon-seong	18	24

=== Women's doubles ===
Semi-finals
1	(Chinese Taipei) Cheng Wen-hsing (Chinese Taipei) Chien Yu-chin	19	18
3	(South Korea) Lee Hyo-jung (South Korea) Lee Kyung-won	21	21
4	(China) Yang Wei (China) Zhang Jiewen	16	20
(China) Ma Jin (China) Wang Xiaoli	21	22

Final
3	(South Korea) Lee Hyo-jung (South Korea) Lee Kyung-won	11	18
(China) Ma Jin (China) Wang Xiaoli	21	21

=== Mixed doubles ===
Semi-finals
1	(South Korea) Lee Yong-dae (South Korea) Lee Hyo-jung	21	21
(China) Tao Jiaming (China) Ma Jin	16	18
(Japan) Noriyasu Hirata (Japan) Miyuki Maeda	15	15
(South Korea) Yoo Yeon-seong (South Korea) Kim Min-jung	21	21

Final
1	(South Korea) Lee Yong-dae (South Korea) Lee Hyo-jung	21	21
(South Korea) Yoo Yeon-seong (South Korea) Kim Min-jung	12	15
