= Noriyasu Hirata =

Japanese badminton player (born 1983)

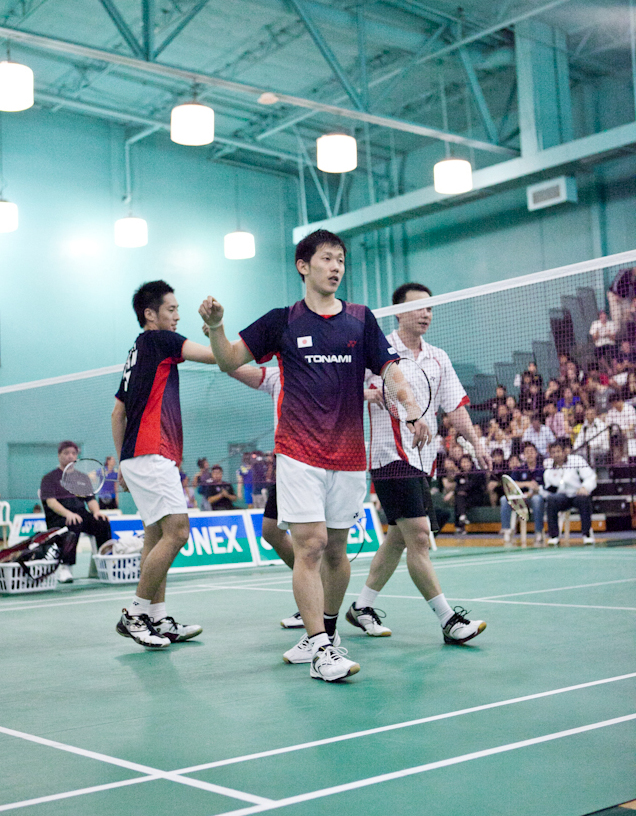

Personal information
- Born: 17 November 1983 (age 42) Fuchu, Toyama, Japan
- Height: 1.80 m (5 ft 11 in)
- Weight: 77 kg (170 lb)

Sport
- Country: Japan
- Sport: Badminton
- Handedness: Right

Men's & mixed doubles
- Highest ranking: 7 (MD 26 April 2012); 28 (XD 25 March 2010)
- BWF profile
Medal record
Men's badminton
Representing Japan
Sudirman Cup
Silver medal – second place	2015 Dongguan	Mixed team
Thomas Cup
Gold medal – first place	2014 New Delhi	Men's team
Bronze medal – third place	2010 Kuala Lumpur	Men's team
Bronze medal – third place	2012 Wuhan	Men's team
Asia Championships
Silver medal – second place	2011 Chengdu	Men's doubles
Bronze medal – third place	2009 Suwon	Mixed doubles
East Asian Games
Bronze medal – third place	2009 Hong Kong	Men's team

Noriyasu Hirata (平田 典靖, Hirata Noriyasu; born 17 November 1983) is a Japanese badminton player from Tonami Transportation badminton team. In 2013, he and his men's doubles partner Hirokatsu Hashimoto, received the Badminton Nippon League's Valuable Player Award. He competed at the 2010 and 2014 Asian Games.

== Career ==
In 2011, Hirata and his men's doubles partner Hirokatsu Hashimoto won the India Open, making history as the first Japanese male players to capture a BWF Super Series title.

Hirata appointed as mixed doubles coach of the Japan national team for 2025.

== Achievements ==
=== Asian Championships ===
Men's doubles
Year	Venue	Partner	Opponent	Score	Result	Ref.
2011	Sichuan Gymnasium; Chengdu, China	(Japan) Hirokatsu Hashimoto	(China) Cai Yun (China) Fu Haifeng	12–21, 15–21	Silver	

Mixed doubles
Year	Venue	Partner	Opponent	Score	Result	Ref.
2009	Suwon Indoor Stadium; Suwon, South Korea	(Japan) Miyuki Maeda	(South Korea) Yoo Yeon-seong (South Korea) Kim Min-jung	15–21, 15–21	Bronze	

=== BWF Superseries ===
The BWF Superseries, which was launched on 14 December 2006 and implemented in 2007, was a series of elite badminton tournaments, sanctioned by the Badminton World Federation (BWF). BWF Superseries levels were Superseries and Superseries Premier. A season of Superseries consisted of twelve tournaments around the world that had been introduced since 2011. Successful players were invited to the Superseries Finals, which were held at the end of each year.

Men's doubles
Year	Tournament	Partner	Opponent	Score	Result	Ref.
2011	India Open	(Japan) Hirokatsu Hashimoto	(Indonesia) Angga Pratama (Indonesia) Rian Agung Saputro	21–17, 21–9	(gold) Winner	

BWF Super Series tournament

=== BWF Grand Prix ===
The BWF Grand Prix had two levels, the Grand Prix and Grand Prix Gold. It was a series of badminton tournaments sanctioned by the Badminton World Federation (BWF) and played between 2007 and 2017.

Men's doubles
Year	Tournament	Partner	Opponent	Score	Result	Ref.
2009	New Zealand Open	(Japan) Hirokatsu Hashimoto	(India) Rupesh Kumar K. T. (India) Sanave Thomas	16–21, 21–15, 13–21	(silver) Runner-up	
2010	Dutch Open	(Japan) Hirokatsu Hashimoto	(Japan) Yoshiteru Hirobe (Japan) Kenta Kazuno	21–17, 21–13	(gold) Winner	

BWF Grand Prix tournament

=== BWF International Challenge/Series ===
Men's doubles
Year	Tournament	Partner	Opponent	Score	Result	Ref.
2009	Osaka International	(Japan) Hirokatsu Hashimoto	(Japan) Yoshiteru Hirobe (Japan) Hajime Komiyama	19–21, 10–21	(silver) Runner-up	
2010	Osaka International	(Japan) Hirokatsu Hashimoto	(Japan) Hiroyuki Endo (Japan) Yoshiteru Hirobe	16–21, 23–21, 21–17	(gold) Winner	

Mixed doubles
Year	Tournament	Partner	Opponent	Score	Result	Ref.
2008	Osaka International	(Japan) Shizuka Matsuo	(South Korea) Kwon Yi-goo (South Korea) Ha Jung-eun	22–24, 13–21	(silver) Runner-up	
2008	Australian International	(Japan) Shizuka Matsuo	(Chinese Taipei) Chen Hung-ling (Chinese Taipei) Chou Chia-chi	16–21, 4–21	(silver) Runner-up	
2009	Osaka International	(Japan) Shizuka Matsuo	(Chinese Taipei) Hsieh Yu-hsing (Chinese Taipei) Chien Yu-chin	18–21, 15–21	(silver) Runner-up	

BWF International Challenge tournament

== Record against selected opponents ==
Men's doubles results with Hirokatsu Hashimoto against Super Series finalists, Worlds Semi-finalists, and Olympic quarterfinalists.

- (China) Cai Yun & Fu Haifeng 0–4
- (China) Chai Biao & Guo Zhendong 1–3
- (China) Guo Zhendong & Xu Chen 0–2
- (China) Chai Biao & Hong Wei 0–2
- (China) Liu Xiaolong & Qiu Zihan 1–2
- (Chinese Taipei) Fang Chieh-min & Lee Sheng-mu 2–6
- (Chinese Taipei) Lee Sheng-mu & Tsai Chia-hsin 1–3
- (Denmark) Mathias Boe & Carsten Mogensen 0–5
- (Indonesia) Markis Kido & Hendra Setiawan 2–3
- (Indonesia) Angga Pratama & Rian Agung Saputro 4–1
- (Indonesia) Mohammad Ahsan & Bona Septano 0–1
- (Indonesia) Mohammad Ahsan & Hendra Setiawan 0–2
- (Japan) Hiroyuki Endo & Kenichi Hayakawa 0–4
- (South Korea) Jung Jae-sung & Lee Yong-dae 0–2
- (South Korea) Ko Sung-hyun & Yoo Yeon-seong 2–4
- (South Korea) Ko Sung-hyun & Lee Yong-dae 0–3
- (South Korea) Lee Yong-dae & Yoo Yeon-seong 0–1
- (Malaysia) Mohd Zakry Abdul Latif & Mohd Fairuzizuan Mohd Tazari 1–0
- (Malaysia) Koo Kien Keat & Tan Boon Heong 2–2
- (Malaysia) Goh V Shem & Lim Khim Wah 2–1
- (Thailand) Bodin Isara & Maneepong Jongjit 0–1
- (United States) Howard Bach & Tony Gunawan 0–2
