= Badminton Asia Championships =

Badminton championships

- Founded: 1962
- Country: Badminton Asia Confederation
- Website: www.badmintonasia.org

The Badminton Asia Championships (formerly Asian Badminton Championships until 2006) is a tournament organized by governing body Badminton Asia to crown the best badminton players in Asia.

The tournament started in 1962 and is held annually since 1991. The event had rotated between team and individual competitions before the team event became null since 1994.

At the 2003 event however, there is a controversy when China decided to pull out from the tournament at the last minute. Head coach Li Yongbo said that the tournament did not award any ranking points for the 2004 Summer Olympics event and wanted to give his players more time to rest. Some of the top players were also willing to pull out from the tournament since the competitiveness of the event was low.

== Editions ==
The table below gives an overview of all host cities and countries of the Asia Championships. The most recent games were held in Ningbo in 2025. The number in parentheses following the city/country denotes how many times that city/country has hosted the championships. The number of events at each has ranged from one to six, and is given in the right-most column.

Host cities of the Asia Championships (Asia)

Year	Edition	Host City	Events
1962	1	Kuala Lumpur, Malaya (1)	6
1965	2	Lucknow, India (1)	6
1969	3	Manila, Philippines (1)	5
1971	4	Jakarta, Indonesia (1)	6
1976	5	Hyderabad, India (1)	6
1983	6	Calcutta, India (1)	6
1985	7	Kuala Lumpur, Malaysia (2)	5
1987	8	Semarang, Indonesia (1)	1
1989	9	Shanghai, China (1)	1
1991	10	Kuala Lumpur, Malaysia (3)	5
1992	11	Kuala Lumpur, Malaysia (4)	5
1993	12	Hong Kong (1)	1
1994	13	Shanghai, China (2)	5
1995	14	Beijing, China (1)	5
1996	15	Surabaya, Indonesia (1)	5
1997	16	Kuala Lumpur, Malaysia (5)	5
1998	17	Bangkok, Thailand (1)	5
1999	18	Kuala Lumpur, Malaysia (6)	5
2000	19	Jakarta, Indonesia (2)	5
2001	20	Manila, Philippines (2)	5
2002	21	Bangkok, Thailand (2)	5
2003	22	Jakarta, Indonesia (3)	5

Year	Edition	Host City	Events
2004	23	Kuala Lumpur, Malaysia (7)	5
2005	24	Hyderabad, India (2)	5
2006	25	Johor Bahru, Malaysia (1)	5
2007	26	Johor Bahru, Malaysia (2)	5
2008	27	Johor Bahru, Malaysia (3)	5
2009	28	Suwon, South Korea (1)	5
2010	29	New Delhi, India (1)	5
2011	30	Chengdu, China (1)	5
2012	31	Qingdao, China (1)	5
2013	32	Taipei, Taiwan (1)	5
2014	33	Gimcheon, South Korea (1)	5
2015	34	Wuhan, China (1)	5
2016	35	Wuhan, China (2)	5
2017	36	Wuhan, China (3)	5
2018	37	Wuhan, China (4)	5
2019	38	Wuhan, China (5)	5
2022	39	Manila, Philippines (3)	5
2023	40	Dubai, United Arab Emirates (1)	5
2024	41	Ningbo, China (1)	5
2025	42	Ningbo, China (2)	5
2026	43	Ningbo, China (3)	5
2027	44	Ningbo, China (4)	5

== All-time medal table ==
=== Individual medalists ===
- Accurate as of 2026 Badminton Asia Championships.

Rank	NOC	Gold	Silver	Bronze	Total
1	China	83	79	114	276
2	South Korea	37	27	46	110
3	Indonesia	35	31	84	150
4	Malaysia	17.5	18.5	28	64
5	Japan	8	18	35	61
6	Hong Kong	6	5	15	26
7	Thailand	4	12	26	42
8	Chinese Taipei	3	3	15	21
9	England	2.5	1.5	0	4
10	India	2	1	16	19
11	Singapore	0	1	3	4
12	Burma	0	1	1	2
13	Philippines	0	0	3	3
14	Sri Lanka	0	0	1	1
14	Vietnam	0	0	1	1
Totals (15 entries)		198	198	388	784

=== Men's team medalists (1962 – 1993) ===
Rank	NOC	Gold	Silver	Bronze	Total
1	Indonesia	4	3	2	9
2	China	4	2	0	6
3	Malaysia	2	3	2	7
4	India	0	1	1	2
4	Thailand	0	1	1	2
6	Japan	0	0	4	4
7	South Korea	0	0	2	2
8	Chinese Taipei	0	0	1	1
8	Pakistan	0	0	1	1
Totals (9 entries)		10	10	14	34

== Past winners ==
Year	Men's singles	Women's singles	Men's doubles	Women's doubles	Mixed doubles
1962	(Federation of Malaya) Teh Kew San	(Indonesia) Minarni	(Federation of Malaya) Ng Boon Bee (Federation of Malaya) Tan Yee Khan	(Indonesia) Happy Herowati (Indonesia) Corry Kawilarang	(Federation of Malaya) Lim Say Hup (Federation of Malaya) Ng Mei Ling
1965	(India) Dinesh Khanna	(England) Angela Bairstow	(Thailand) Narong Bhornchima (Thailand) Chavalert Chumkum	(England) Angela Bairstow (England) Ursula Smith	(Malaysia) Tan Yee Khan (England) Angela Bairstow
1969	(Indonesia) Muljadi	(Hong Kong) Pang Yuet Mui	(Malaysia) Punch Gunalan (Malaysia) Ng Boon Bee	(South Korea) Kang Young-sin (South Korea) Lee Young-soon	Not held
1971	(Malaysia) Tan Aik Mong	(Indonesia) Utami Kinard	(Indonesia) Indra Gunawan (Indonesia) Nara Sudjana	(Indonesia) Retno Koestijah (Indonesia) Intan Nurtjahja	(Indonesia) Christian Hadinata (Indonesia) Retno Koestijah
1976	(China) Hou Jiachang	(China) Liang Qiuxia	(Indonesia) Ade Chandra (Indonesia) Tjun Tjun	(Indonesia) Regina Masli (Indonesia) Theresia Widiastuti	(China) Fang Kaixiang (China) He Cuiling
1983	(China) Chen Changjie	(South Korea) Yoo Sang-hee	(China) He Shangquan (China) Jiang Guoliang	(China) Fan Ming (China) Guan Weizhen	(South Korea) Park Joo-bong (South Korea) Kim Yun-ja
1985	(China) Zhao Jianhua	(China) Zheng Yuli	(South Korea) Kim Moon-soo (South Korea) Park Joo-bong	(South Korea) Kim Yun-ja (South Korea) Yoo Sang-hee	Not held
1991	(Malaysia) Rashid Sidek	(Indonesia) Yuliani Sentosa	(South Korea) Kim Moon-soo (South Korea) Park Joo-bong	(South Korea) Chung So-young (South Korea) Hwang Hye-young	(South Korea) Park Joo-bong (South Korea) Chung Myung-hee
1992	(Malaysia) Rashid Sidek	(China) Ye Zhaoying	(Malaysia) Jalani Sidek (Malaysia) Razif Sidek	(China) Pan Li (China) Wu Yuhong	(Indonesia) Joko Mardianto (Indonesia) Sri Untari
1994	(Malaysia) Foo Kok Keong	(China) Ye Zhaoying	(China) Chen Hongyong (China) Chen Kang	(China) Ge Fei (China) Gu Jun	(China) Chen Xingdong (China) Sun Man
1995	(South Korea) Park Sung-woo	(China) Ye Zhaoying	(Malaysia) Cheah Soon Kit (Malaysia) Yap Kim Hock	(China) Ge Fei (China) Gu Jun	(China) Liu Jianjun (China) Ge Fei
1996	(Indonesia) Jeffer Rosobin	(China) Gong Zhichao	(Indonesia) Ade Sutrisna (Indonesia) Candra Wijaya	(Indonesia) Finarsih (Indonesia) Eliza Nathanael	(Indonesia) Tri Kusharjanto (Indonesia) Lili Tampi
1997	(China) Sun Jun	(China) Yao Yan	(Indonesia) Antonius Ariantho (Indonesia) Denny Kantono	(China) Huang Nanyan (China) Liu Zhong	(China) Zhang Jun (China) Liu Lu
1998	(China) Chen Gang	(China) Ye Zhaoying	(South Korea) Ha Tae-kwon (South Korea) Kang Kyung-jin	(China) Ge Fei (China) Gu Jun	(South Korea) Kim Dong-moon (South Korea) Ra Kyung-min
1999	(China) Chen Hong	(China) Ye Zhaoying	(South Korea) Ha Tae-kwon (South Korea) Kim Dong-moon	(China) Ge Fei (China) Gu Jun	(South Korea) Kim Dong-moon (South Korea) Ra Kyung-min
2000	(Indonesia) Taufik Hidayat	(China) Xie Xingfang	(Indonesia) Tony Gunawan (Indonesia) Rexy Mainaky	(South Korea) Lee Hyo-jung (South Korea) Yim Kyung-jin	(Indonesia) Bambang Suprianto (Indonesia) Minarti Timur
2001	(China) Xia Xuanze	(China) Zhang Ning	(Indonesia) Tri Kusharjanto (Indonesia) Bambang Suprianto	(China) Gao Ling (China) Huang Sui	(South Korea) Kim Dong-moon (South Korea) Ra Kyung-min
2002	(Indonesia) Sony Dwi Kuncoro	(China) Zhou Mi	(South Korea) Ha Tae-kwon (South Korea) Kim Dong-moon	(China) Yang Wei (China) Zhang Jiewen	(China) Zhang Jun (China) Gao Ling
2003	(Indonesia) Sony Dwi Kuncoro	(Hong Kong) Wang Chen	(South Korea) Lee Dong-soo (South Korea) Yoo Yong-sung	(South Korea) Lee Kyung-won (South Korea) Ra Kyung-min	(Indonesia) Nova Widianto (Indonesia) Vita Marissa
2004	(Indonesia) Taufik Hidayat	(South Korea) Jun Jae-youn	(Indonesia) Sigit Budiarto (Indonesia) Tri Kusharjanto	(South Korea) Lee Hyo-jung (South Korea) Lee Kyung-won	(South Korea) Kim Dong-moon (South Korea) Ra Kyung-min
2005	(Indonesia) Sony Dwi Kuncoro	(Hong Kong) Wang Chen	(Indonesia) Markis Kido (Indonesia) Hendra Setiawan	(South Korea) Lee Hyo-jung (South Korea) Lee Kyung-won	(Thailand) Sudket Prapakamol (Thailand) Saralee Thungthongkam
2006	(Malaysia) Lee Chong Wei	(Hong Kong) Wang Chen	(Malaysia) Choong Tan Fook (Malaysia) Lee Wan Wah	(China) Du Jing (China) Yu Yang	(Indonesia) Nova Widianto (Indonesia) Liliyana Natsir
2007	(Indonesia) Taufik Hidayat	(China) Jiang Yanjiao	(Malaysia) Choong Tan Fook (Malaysia) Lee Wan Wah	(China) Yang Wei (China) Zhao Tingting	(China) He Hanbin (China) Yu Yang
2008	(South Korea) Park Sung-hwan	(China) Jiang Yanjiao	(South Korea) Jung Jae-sung (South Korea) Lee Yong-dae	(China) Yang Wei (China) Zhang Jiewen	(Indonesia) Flandy Limpele (Indonesia) Vita Marissa
2009	(China) Bao Chunlai	(China) Zhu Lin	(Indonesia) Markis Kido (Indonesia) Hendra Setiawan	(China) Ma Jin (China) Wang Xiaoli	(South Korea) Lee Yong-dae (South Korea) Lee Hyo-jung
2010	(China) Lin Dan	(China) Li Xuerui	(South Korea) Cho Gun-woo (South Korea) Yoo Yeon-seong	(China) Pan Pan (China) Tian Qing	(Malaysia) Chan Peng Soon (Malaysia) Goh Liu Ying
2011	(China) Lin Dan	(China) Wang Yihan	(China) Cai Yun (China) Fu Haifeng	(China) Wang Xiaoli (China) Yu Yang	(China) Zhang Nan (China) Zhao Yunlei
2012	(China) Chen Jin	(China) Li Xuerui	(South Korea) Kim Gi-jung (South Korea) Kim Sa-rang	(China) Tian Qing (China) Zhao Yunlei	(China) Zhang Nan (China) Zhao Yunlei
2013	(China) Du Pengyu	(China) Wang Yihan	(South Korea) Ko Sung-hyun (South Korea) Lee Yong-dae	(China) Wang Xiaoli (China) Yu Yang	(South Korea) Ko Sung-hyun (South Korea) Kim Ha-na
2014	(China) Lin Dan	(South Korea) Sung Ji-hyun	(South Korea) Shin Baek-cheol (South Korea) Yoo Yeon-seong	(China) Luo Ying (China) Luo Yu	(Hong Kong) Lee Chun Hei (Hong Kong) Chau Hoi Wah
2015	(China) Lin Dan	(Thailand) Ratchanok Intanon	(South Korea) Lee Yong-dae (South Korea) Yoo Yeon-seong	(China) Ma Jin (China) Tang Yuanting	(Indonesia) Tontowi Ahmad (Indonesia) Liliyana Natsir
2016	(Malaysia) Lee Chong Wei	(China) Wang Yihan	(South Korea) Lee Yong-dae (South Korea) Yoo Yeon-seong	(Japan) Misaki Matsutomo (Japan) Ayaka Takahashi	(China) Zhang Nan (China) Zhao Yunlei
2017	(China) Chen Long	(Chinese Taipei) Tai Tzu-ying	(China) Li Junhui (China) Liu Yuchen	(Japan) Misaki Matsutomo (Japan) Ayaka Takahashi	(China) Lu Kai (China) Huang Yaqiong
2018	(Japan) Kento Momota	(Chinese Taipei) Tai Tzu-ying	(China) Li Junhui (China) Liu Yuchen	(Japan) Yuki Fukushima (Japan) Sayaka Hirota	(China) Wang Yilyu (China) Huang Dongping
2019	(Japan) Kento Momota	(Japan) Akane Yamaguchi	(Japan) Hiroyuki Endo (Japan) Yuta Watanabe	(China) Chen Qingchen (China) Jia Yifan	(China) Wang Yilyu (China) Huang Dongping
2020	Cancelled (Note: This tournament, originally to be played from 21 to 26 April, was later cancelled due to COVID-19 pandemic in the Philippines.)				
2021	Cancelled				
2022	(Malaysia) Lee Zii Jia	(China) Wang Zhiyi	(Indonesia) Pramudya Kusumawardana (Indonesia) Yeremia Rambitan	(China) Chen Qingchen (China) Jia Yifan	(China) Zheng Siwei (China) Huang Yaqiong
2023	(Indonesia) Anthony Sinisuka Ginting	(Chinese Taipei) Tai Tzu-ying	(India) Satwiksairaj Rankireddy (India) Chirag Shetty	(Japan) Yuki Fukushima (Japan) Sayaka Hirota	(China) Jiang Zhenbang (China) Wei Yaxin
2024	(Indonesia) Jonatan Christie	(China) Wang Zhiyi	(China) Liang Weikeng (China) Wang Chang	(South Korea) Baek Ha-na (South Korea) Lee So-hee	(China) Feng Yanzhe (China) Huang Dongping
2025	(Thailand) Kunlavut Vitidsarn	(China) Chen Yufei	(Malaysia) Aaron Chia (Malaysia) Soh Wooi Yik	(China) Liu Shengshu (China) Tan Ning	(Hong Kong) Tang Chun Man (Hong Kong) Tse Ying Suet
2026	(China) Shi Yuqi	(South Korea) An Se-young	(South Korea) Kim Won-ho (South Korea) Seo Seung-jae	(China) Li Yijing (China) Luo Xumin	(South Korea) Kim Jae-hyeon (South Korea) Jang Ha-jeong

=== Men's team (1962–1993) ===
Year	Winners
1962	(Federation of Malaya) Malaya
1965	Malaysia
1969	Indonesia
1971	Indonesia
1976	Indonesia
1983	China
1985	China
1987	China
1989	China
1993	Indonesia

== Performance by nations ==
As of 2026 edition

Pos	Nation	MS	WS	MD	WD	XD	Total
1	China	16	23	6	23	15	83
2	South Korea	2	4	14	8	9	37
3	Indonesia	10	3	10	4	8	35
4	Malaysia	8		7		2.5	17.5
5	Japan	2	1	1	4		8
6	Hong Kong		4			2	6
7	Thailand	1	1	1		1	4
8	Chinese Taipei		3				3
9	England		1		1	0.5	2.5
10	India	1		1			2
Total		40	40	40	40	38	198

== Successful players and national teams ==
=== Asian Champions who also became World Champions ===
List of players who have won Asia Championships and also won the BWF World Championships to become both the Asian Champion and World Champion.

Type	Player	Asian Champion (Year)	World Champion (Year)
Mixed Doubles	(Indonesia) Christian Hadinata	1971	1980
Men's Doubles	(Indonesia) Tjun Tjun	1976	1977
Men's Doubles	(Indonesia) Ade Chandra	1976	1980
Women's Doubles	(China) Guan Weizhen	1983	1987, 1989, 1991
Mixed Doubles	(South Korea) Park Joo-bong	1983, 1991	1985, 1989, 1991
Men's Singles	(China) Zhao Jianhua	1985	1991
Men's Doubles	(South Korea) Park Joo-bong	1985, 1991	1985, 1991
Men's Doubles	(South Korea) Kim Moon-soo	1985, 1991	1985, 1991
Mixed Doubles	(South Korea) Chung Myung-hee	1991	1989, 1991
Women's Singles	(China) Ye Zhaoying	1992, 1994, 1995, 1998, 1999	1995, 1997
Women's Doubles	(China) Ge Fei	1994, 1995, 1998, 1999	1997, 1999
Women's Doubles	(China) Gu Jun	1994, 1995, 1998, 1999	1997, 1999
Mixed Doubles	(China) Ge Fei	1995	1997
Men's Doubles	(Indonesia) Candra Wijaya	1996	1997
Men's Singles	(China) Sun Jun	1997	1999
Mixed Doubles	(China) Zhang Jun	1997, 2002	2001
Men's Doubles	(South Korea) Ha Tae-kwon	1998, 1999, 2002	1999
Men's Doubles	(South Korea) Kim Dong-moon	1999, 2002	1999
Mixed Doubles	(South Korea) Kim Dong-moon	1998, 1999, 2001, 2004	1999, 2003
Mixed Doubles	(South Korea) Ra Kyung-min	1998, 1999, 2001, 2004	1999, 2003
Men's Singles	(Indonesia) Taufik Hidayat	2000, 2004, 2007	2005
Women's Singles	(China) Xie Xingfang	2000	2005, 2006
Men's Doubles	(Indonesia) Rexy Mainaky	2000	1995
Men's Doubles	(Indonesia) / (United States) Tony Gunawan	2000	2001, 2005
Men's Singles	(China) Xia Xuanze	2001	2003
Women's Singles	(China) Zhang Ning	2001	2003
Women's Doubles	(China) Gao Ling	2001	2001, 2003, 2006
Mixed Doubles	(China) Gao Ling	2002	2001
Mixed Doubles	(Indonesia) Nova Widianto	2003, 2006	2005, 2007
Men's Doubles	(Indonesia) Sigit Budiarto	2004	1997
Men's Doubles	(Indonesia) Markis Kido	2005, 2009	2007
Men's Doubles	(Indonesia) Hendra Setiawan	2005, 2009	2007, 2013, 2015, 2019
Women's Doubles	(China) Du Jing	2006	2010
Women's Doubles	(China) Yu Yang	2006, 2011, 2013	2010, 2011, 2013
Mixed Doubles	(Indonesia) Liliyana Natsir	2006, 2015	2005, 2007, 2013, 2017
Women's Doubles	(China) Yang Wei	2007, 2008	2005, 2007
Women's Doubles	(China) Zhao Tingting	2007	2009
Women's Doubles	(China) Zhang Jiewen	2008	2005, 2007
Women's Singles	(China) Zhu Lin	2009	2007
Women's Doubles	(China) Wang Xiaoli	2009, 2011, 2013	2011, 2013
Men's singles	(China) Lin Dan	2010, 2011, 2014, 2015	2006, 2007, 2009, 2011, 2013
Women's Doubles	(China) Tian Qing	2010, 2012	2014, 2015
Women's Singles	(China) Wang Yihan	2011, 2013, 2016	2011
Men's Doubles	(China) Fu Haifeng	2011	2006, 2009, 2010, 2011
Men's Doubles	(China) Cai Yun	2011	2006, 2009, 2010, 2011
Mixed Doubles	(China) Zhang Nan	2011, 2012, 2016	2011, 2014, 2015
Mixed Doubles	(China) Zhao Yunlei	2011, 2012, 2016	2011, 2014, 2015
Men's Singles	(China) Chen Jin	2012	2010
Women's Doubles	(China) Zhao Yunlei	2012	2014, 2015
Men's Doubles	(South Korea) Ko Sung-hyun	2013	2014
Men's Doubles	(South Korea) Shin Baek-cheol	2014	2014
Women's Singles	(Thailand) Ratchanok Intanon	2015	2013
Mixed Doubles	(Indonesia) Tontowi Ahmad	2015	2013, 2017
Men's Singles	(China) Chen Long	2017	2014, 2015
Men's Doubles	(China) Li Junhui	2017, 2018	2018
Men's Doubles	(China) Liu Yuchen	2017, 2018	2018
Mixed Doubles	(China) Huang Yaqiong	2017, 2022	2018, 2019, 2022
Men's Singles	(Japan) Kento Momota	2018, 2019	2018, 2019
Women's Singles	(Japan) Akane Yamaguchi	2019	2021, 2022
Women's Doubles	(China) Chen Qingchen	2019, 2022	2017, 2021, 2022, 2023
Women's Doubles	(China) Jia Yifan	2019, 2022	2017, 2021, 2022, 2023
Mixed Doubles	(China) Zheng Siwei	2022	2018, 2019, 2022
Men's Singles	(Thailand) Kunlavut Vitidsarn	2025	2023
Men's Doubles	(Malaysia) Aaron Chia	2025	2022
Men's Doubles	(Malaysia) Soh Wooi Yik	2025	2022
Women's Doubles	(China) Liu Shengshu	2025	2025
Women's Doubles	(China) Tan Ning	2025	2025
Women's Singles	(South Korea) An Se-young	2026	2023
Men's Doubles	(South Korea) Kim Won-ho	2026	2025
Men's Doubles	(South Korea) Seo Seung-jae	2026	2023, 2025
Men's Singles	(China) Shi Yuqi	2026	2025

=== Successful players ===
Below is the list of the most ever successful players in the Badminton Asia Championships, with 3 or more gold medals.

Rank	Players	MS	WS	MD	WD	XD	Total
1	(South Korea) Kim Dong-moon			2		4	6
2	(China) Ge Fei				4	1	5
2	(China) Ye Zhaoying		5				5
2	(South Korea) Lee Yong-dae			4		1	5
2	(South Korea) Ra Kyung-min				1	4	5
6	(China) Gu Jun				4		4
6	(China) Lin Dan	4					4
6	(China) Yu Yang				3	1	4
6	(China) Zhao Yunlei				1	3	4
6	(South Korea) Park Joo-bong			2		2	4
6	(South Korea) Lee Hyo-jung				3	1	4
6	(South Korea) Yoo Yeon-seong			4			4
13	(China) Wang Xiaoli				3		3
13	(China) Wang Yihan		3				3
13	(China) Yang Wei				3		3
13	(China) Zhang Nan					3	3
13	(England) Angela Bairstow		1		1	1	3
13	(Hong Kong) Wang Chen		3				3
13	(Indonesia) Sony Dwi Kuncoro	3					3
13	(Indonesia) Taufik Hidayat	3					3
13	(Indonesia) Tri Kusharjanto			2		1	3
13	(South Korea) Ha Tae-kwon			3			3
13	(South Korea) Lee Kyung-won				3		3
13	(Chinese Taipei) Tai Tzu-ying		3				3

MS: Men's singles; WS: Women's singles; MD: Men's doubles; WD: Women's doubles; XD: Mixed doubles

=== Successful national teams ===
Below are the gold medal teams, shown by year as against by country. China has been the most successful and the only country to achieve a full slate of golds which they did in 2011.

Rank	Country	62	65	69	71	76	83	85	87	89	91	92	93	94	95	96	97	98	99	00	01	02	03	04	05	06	07	08	09	10	11	12	13	14	15	16	17	18	19	22	23	24	25	26	Total
1	China					3	3	2^{2}				2^{3}		4	3	1	4	3	3	1	3	3				1	3	2^{5}	3	3	5	4	3	2^{6}	2	2	3	2^{7}	2	3	1	3	2	2	83
2	South Korea			1			2	2			3				1			2	2	1	1	1	2	3	1			2	1	1		1	2	2	1	1						1		3	37
3	Indonesia	2		1^{1}	4	2					1	1				4	1			3	1	1	2^{4}	2	2	1	1	1	1						1					1	1	1			35
4	Malaysia	3	0.5	1	1						1	2		1	1											2	1			1						1				1			1		17.5
5	Japan																																			1	1	2	3		1				8
6	Hong Kong			1																			1		1	1								1									1		6
7	Thailand		1																						1										1								1		4
8	Chinese Taipei																																				1	1			1				3
9	England		2.5																																										2.5
10	India		1																																						1				2

BOLD highlights the overall winner therefore at that Asia Team Championships

^1 Indonesia won on superior of silver medal, thus, Indonesia became overall winner.
^2 China won on superior of silver medal to Korea, thus, China became overall winner.
^3 China won on superior of silver medal of three silver medals to Malaysia none, thus, China became overall winner.
^4 Indonesia won on superior of silver medal of four silver medals to South Korea one, thus, Indonesia became overall winner.
^5 China won on superior of silver medal of two silver medals to South Korea none, thus, China became overall winner.
^6 China won on superior of bronze medal of four bronze medals to South Korea one, thus, China became overall winner.
^7 China won on superior of bronze medal of four bronze medals to Japan none, thus, China became overall winner.
^8 China won on superior of silver medal of one silver medal to Chinese Taipei, India, Indonesia, and Japan none, thus, China became overall winner.

=== Men's singles ===
Rank	Country	62	65	69	71	76	83	85	91	92	94	95	96	97	98	99	00	01	02	03	04	05	06	07	08	09	10	11	12	13	14	15	16	17	18	19	22	23	24	25	26	Total
1	China					X	X	X						X	X	X		X								X	X	X	X	X	X	X		X							X	16
2	Indonesia			X									X				X		X	X	X	X		X														X	X			10
3	Malaysia	X			X				X	X	X												X										X				X					8
4	South Korea											X													X																	2
4	Japan																																		X	X						2
6	India		X																																							1
6	Thailand																																							X		1

=== Women's singles ===
Rank	Country	62	65	69	71	76	83	85	91	92	94	95	96	97	98	99	00	01	02	03	04	05	06	07	08	09	10	11	12	13	14	15	16	17	18	19	22	23	24	25	26	Total
1	China					X		X		X	X	X	X	X	X	X	X	X	X					X	X	X	X	X	X	X			X				X		X	X		23
2	Hong Kong			X																X		X	X																			4
2	South Korea						X														X										X										X	4
4	Indonesia	X			X				X																																	3
4	Chinese Taipei																																	X	X			X				3
6	England		X																																							1
6	Thailand																															X										1
6	Japan																																			X						1

=== Men's doubles ===
Rank	Country	62	65	69	71	76	83	85	91	92	94	95	96	97	98	99	00	01	02	03	04	05	06	07	08	09	10	11	12	13	14	15	16	17	18	19	22	23	24	25	26	Total
1	South Korea							X	X						X	X			X	X					X		X		X	X	X	X	X								X	14
2	Indonesia				X	X							X	X			X	X			X	X				X											X					10
3	Malaysia	X		X						X		X											X	X																X		7
4	China						X				X																	X						X	X				X			6
5	Thailand		X																																							1
5	Japan																																			X						1
5	India																																					X				1

=== Women's doubles ===
Rank	Country	62	65	69	71	76	83	85	91	92	94	95	96	97	98	99	00	01	02	03	04	05	06	07	08	09	10	11	12	13	14	15	16	17	18	19	22	23	24	25	26	Total
1	China						X			X	X	X		X	X	X		X	X				X	X	X	X	X	X	X	X	X	X				X	X			X	X	23
2	South Korea			X				X	X								X			X	X	X																	X			8
3	Indonesia	X			X	X							X																													4
3	Japan																																X	X	X			X				4
5	England		X																																							1

=== Mixed doubles ===
Rank	Country	62	65	69	71	76	83	85	91	92	94	95	96	97	98	99	00	01	02	03	04	05	06	07	08	09	10	11	12	13	14	15	16	17	18	19	22	23	24	25	26	Total
1	China					X					X	X		X					X					X				X	X				X	X	X	X	X	X	X			15
2	South Korea						X		X						X	X		X			X					X				X											X	9
3	Indonesia				X					X			X				X			X			X		X							X										8
4	Malaysia	X	\																								X															2.5
5	Hong Kong																														X									X		2
6	Thailand																					X																				1
7	England		\																																							0.5

== Unofficial championships ==
- In addition to official championships, a few invitational Asian championships were also conducted.

Year	Number	Host City	Events
1976	I	Bangkok, Thailand	4
1977	II	Hong Kong	4
1978	III	Peking, China	4
1980	IV	Bangkok, Thailand	4
1988	V	Bandar Lampung, Indonesia	4

Year	Men's singles	Women's singles	Men's doubles	Women's doubles	Mixed doubles
1976 (I)	(Indonesia) Iie Sumirat	(China) Liang Qiuxia	(Indonesia) Ade Chandra (Indonesia) Christian Hadinata	(Malaysia) Sylvia Ng (Malaysia) Rosalind Singha Ang	Not held
1977	(China) Yu Yaodong	(China) Liang Qiuxia	(Indonesia) Tjun Tjun (Indonesia) Johan Wahjudi	(China) Liang Qiuxia (China) Liu Xia	Not held
1978	(China) Yu Yaodong	(China) Liu Xia	(China) Lin Shiquan (China) Tang Xianhu	(Thailand) Sirisriro Patama (Thailand) Kingmanee Thongkam	Not held
1980	(China) Han Jian	(China) Song Youping	(China) Li Zhifeng (China) Yang Kesen	(China) Li Lingwei (China) San Yanqin	Not held
1988	(China) Xiong Guobao	(China) Tang Jiuhong	(China) Zhang Qiang (China) Zhou Jincan	(Indonesia) Verawaty Fajrin (Indonesia) Yanti Kusmiati	Not held

== See also ==
- Badminton Asia Junior Championships
- Badminton Asia Mixed Team Championships
- Badminton Asia Team Championships
