= 2014 Denmark Super Series Premier =

Tournament details
- Dates: 14–19 October 2014
- Level: Super Series Premier
- Total prize money: US$600,000
- Venue: Odense Sports Park
- Location: Odense, Denmark

Champions
- Men's singles: (China) Chen Long
- Women's singles: (China) Li Xuerui
- Men's doubles: (China) Fu Haifeng (China) Zhang Nan
- Women's doubles: (China) Wang Xiaoli (China) Yu Yang
- Mixed doubles: (China) Xu Chen (China) Ma Jin

The 2014 Denmark Super Series Premier was the ninth super series tournament of the 2014 BWF Super Series. The tournament took place in Odense, Denmark from October 14–19, 2014 and had a total purse of $600,000. A qualification was held to fill four places in all five disciplines of the main draws.

== Men's singles ==
=== Seeds ===
1. (Malaysia) Lee Chong Wei (Withdraws)
2. (China) Chen Long
3. (Denmark) Jan Ø. Jørgensen
4. (Japan) Kenichi Tago
5. (Indonesia) Tommy Sugiarto
6. (China) Wang Zhengming
7. (South Korea) Shon Wan-ho
8. (Denmark) Hans-Kristian Vittinghus

=== Top half ===
First Round
PFQ	(China) Xue S	15	21	18
(India) K. Srikanth	21	17	21
Q4	(Denmark) J Persson	23	5	11
(Chinese Taipei) Hsu J-h	21	21	21
7	(South Korea) Shon W-h	21	21
(Hong Kong) Hu Y	17	8
(Japan) K Momota	21	18	21
(Hong Kong) Wei N	15	21	15
PFQ	(South Korea) Lee D-k	21	14	21
Q1	(Republic of Ireland) S Evans	10	21	14
(Thailand) B Ponsana	21	21
Q3	(Denmark) S Rasmussen	17	15
5	(Indonesia) T Sugiarto	14	14
(China) Tian HW	21	21
(Vietnam) Nguyen T M	22	21
(Japan) T Ueda	20	10

Second Round
(India) K. Srikanth	21	21
(Chinese Taipei) Hsu J-h	15	12
7	(South Korea) Shon W-h	22	12	21
(Japan) K Momota	20	21	16
PFQ	(South Korea) Lee D-k	17	12
(Thailand) B Ponsana	21	21
(China) Tian HW	21	21
(Vietnam) Nguyen T M	16	13

Quarterfinals
(India) K. Srikanth	21	17
7	(South Korea) Shon W-h	23	21
(Thailand) B Ponsana	12	19
(China) Tian HW	21	21

Semifinals
7	(South Korea) Shon W-h	21	21
(China) Tian HW	17	9

=== Bottom half ===
First Round
(India) P Kashyap	21	21
(England) R Ouseph	15	18
(Indonesia) D H Rumbaka	17	21	21
6	(China) Wang ZM	21	18	19
(China) Lin D	22	10	21
(Chinese Taipei) Chou T-c	20	21	18
(Germany) M Zwiebler	11	16
3	(Denmark) J Ø Jørgensen	21	21
(China) Chen YK	15	21	21
(Hong Kong) Wong W K	21	17	15
(France) B Leverdez	24	16	21
8	(Denmark) H-K Vittinghus	22	21	18
(Thailand) T Saensomboonsuk	21	7	21
Q2	(Estonia) R Must	8	21	12
(Denmark) V Axelsen	17	10
2	(China) Chen L	21	21

Second Round
(India) P Kashyap	21	17	22
(Indonesia) D H Rumbaka	17	21	20
(China) Lin D
3	(Denmark) J Ø Jørgensen	W	/	O
(China) Chen YK	19	16
(France) B Leverdez	21	21
(Thailand) T Saensomboonsuk	21	19	19
2	(China) Chen L	16	21	21

Quarterfinals
(India) P Kashyap	21	21
3	(Denmark) J Ø Jørgensen	19	15
(France) B Leverdez	9	7
2	(China) Chen L	21	21

Semifinals
(India) P Kashyap	16	15
2	(China) Chen L	21	21

=== Finals ===
Semifinals
7	(South Korea) Shon Wan-ho	21	21
(China) Tian Houwei	17	9
(India) Parupalli Kashyap	16	15
2	(China) Chen Long	21	21

Final
7	(South Korea) Shon Wan-ho	19	22
2	(China) Chen Long	21	24

== Women's singles ==
=== Seeds ===
1. (China) Li Xuerui
2. (China) Wang Shixian
3. (China) Wang Yihan
4. (South Korea) Sung Ji-hyun
5. (Thailand) Ratchanok Intanon
6. (South Korea) Bae Yeon-ju
7. (India) Saina Nehwal

=== Top half ===
First Round
1	(China) Li XR	21	21
(Thailand) P Buranaprasertsuk	15	12
(Japan) S Takahashi	21	21
(Republic of Ireland) Chloe M	13	18
6	(South Korea) Bae Y-j	14	15
(Thailand) B Ongbumrungpan	21	21
(Chinese Taipei) Tai T-y	21	20	16
(United States) Z Beiwen	16	22	21
4	(South Korea) Sung J-h	21	21
(Scotland) K Gilmour	17	11
(Russia) N Perminova	8	13
Q3	(Japan) A Yamaguchi	21	21
PFQ	(Russia) K Polikarpova	13	21	21
Q4	(Denmark) M Poulsen	21	10	18
(India) P.V. Sindhu	21	22
(Hong Kong) Pui Yin Yip	13	20

Second Round
1	(China) Li XR	21	21
(Japan) S Takahashi	14	12
(Thailand) B Ongbumrungpan	15	17
(United States) Z Beiwen	21	21
4	(South Korea) Sung J-h	21	21
Q3	(Japan) A Yamaguchi	13	18
PFQ	(Russia) K Polikarpova	17	19
(India) P.V. Sindhu	21	21

Quarterfinals
1	(China) Li XR	15	21	21
(United States) Z Beiwen	21	15	12
4	(South Korea) Sung J-h	25	22
(India) P.V. Sindhu	23	20

Semifinals
1	(China) Li XR	21	21
4	(South Korea) Sung J-h	17	12

=== Bottom half ===
First Round
(China) Liu X	21	21
(Denmark) A T Madsen	12	6
Q1	(Estonia) K Tolmoff	13	12
5	(Thailand) R Intanon	21	21
(Denmark) L Kjaersfeldt	19	21	16
(Chinese Taipei) Hsu Y-c	21	17	21
(Bulgaria) L Zetchiri	12	10
3	(China) Wang YH	21	21
(China) Han L	17	17
(Japan) M Mitani	21	21
(Germany) K Schnaase	21	10	12
7	(India) S Nehwal	12	21	21
(Japan) E Hirose	21	21
Q2	(United States) R Schafer	12	14
(Chinese Taipei) Pai Y-p	15	15
2	(China) Wang SX	21	21

Second Round
(China) Liu X	21	22	21
5	(Thailand) R Intanon	9	24	13
(Chinese Taipei) Hsu Y-c	15	15
3	(China) Wang YH	21	21
(Japan) M Mitani	12	10
7	(India) S Nehwal	21	21
(Japan) E Hirose	13	9
2	(China) Wang SX	21	21

Quarterfinals
(China) Liu X	12	17
3	(China) Wang YH	21	21
7	(India) S Nehwal	20	15
2	(China) Wang SX	22	21

Semifinals
3	(China) Wang YH	21	21
2	(China) Wang SX	19	12

=== Finals ===
Semifinals
1	(China) Li Xuerui	21	21
4	(South Korea) Sung Ji-hyun	17	12
3	(China) Wang Yihan	21	21
2	(China) Wang Shixian	19	12

Final
1	(China) Li Xuerui	21	22
3	(China) Wang Yihan	17	20

== Men's doubles ==
=== Seeds ===
1. (South Korea) Lee Yong-dae / Yoo Yeon-seong
2. (Indonesia) Mohammad Ahsan / Hendra Setiawan
3. (Denmark) Mathias Boe / Carsten Mogensen
4. (Japan) Hiroyuki Endo / Kenichi Hayakawa
5. (South Korea) Kim Ki-jung / Kim S-r
6. (Chinese Taipei) Lee Sheng-mu / Tsai Chia-hsin
7. (South Korea) Ko Sung-hyun / Shin Baek-cheol
8. (Indonesia) Marcus Fernaldi Gideon / Markis Kido

=== Top half ===
First Round
1	(South Korea) Lee Y-d (South Korea) Yoo Y-s	21	21
(Thailand) W Ampunsuwan (Thailand) P Chalardchaleam	14	10
(Denmark) A Skårup Rasmussen (Denmark) K Astrup Sorensen	21	18	21
(Japan) T Kamura (Japan) K Sonoda	13	21	13
8	(Indonesia) M F Gideon (Indonesia) M Kido	26	21
(France) L Corvee (France) B Leverdez	24	18
(Germany) M Schwenger (Germany) J Zurwonne	21	15	21
(Indonesia) A Adistia (Indonesia) H A Gunawan	17	21	19
3	(Denmark) M Boe (Denmark) C Mogensen	21	21
Q4	(Denmark) M Bay-Smidt (Denmark) F Søgård Mortensen	7	5
(China) Kang J (China) Liu C	21	21
(Poland) Ł Moren (Poland) W Skudlarczyk	17	15
5	(South Korea) Kim K-j (South Korea) Kim S-r	21	21
(China) Li JH (China) Liu YC	15	9
(China) Chai B (China) Hong W	21	21
(Thailand) M Jongjit (Thailand) N Puangpuapech	16	17

Second Round
1	(South Korea) Lee Y-d (South Korea) Yoo Y-s	21	21
(Denmark) A Skårup Rasmussen (Denmark) K Astrup Sorensen	12	8
8	(Indonesia) M F Gideon (Indonesia) M Kido	21	21
(Germany) M Schwenger (Germany) J Zurwonne	7	18
3	(Denmark) M Boe (Denmark) C Mogensen	21	23
(China) Kang J (China) Liu C	16	21
5	(South Korea) Kim K-j (South Korea) Kim S-r	16	19
(China) Chai B (China) Hong W	21	21

Quarterfinals
1	(South Korea) Lee Y-d (South Korea) Yoo Y-s	21	22
8	(Indonesia) M F Gideon (Indonesia) M Kido	10	20
3	(Denmark) M Boe (Denmark) C Mogensen	16	21	21
(China) Chai B (China) Hong W	21	18	15

Semifinals
1	(South Korea) Lee Y-d (South Korea) Yoo Y-s	21	21
3	(Denmark) M Boe (Denmark) C Mogensen	14	17

=== Bottom half ===
First Round
(Belgium) M Dierickx (Belgium) F Golinski	4^{r}
Q2	(Denmark) F Colberg (Denmark) S Gravholt	4
Q3	(Chinese Taipei) C H Ling (Chinese Taipei) W C Lin	21	20	15
7	(South Korea) Ko S-h (South Korea) Shin B-c	18	22	21
(China) Liu XL (China) Qiu ZH	21	21
(Denmark) M Conrad-Petersen (Denmark) M Pieler Kolding	18	17
Q1	(Denmark) A Bond (Denmark) J Eipe	14	13
4	(Japan) H Endo (Japan) K Hayakawa	21	21
(China) Fu HF (China) Zhang N	21	22
(Denmark) M Christiansen (Denmark) D Daugaard	12	20
(Germany) M Fuchs (Germany) J Schöttler	21	15
6	(Chinese Taipei) Lee S-m (Chinese Taipei) Tsai C-h	23	21
(China) Cai Y (China) Lu K	15	21	21
(Russia) V Ivanov (Russia) I Sozonov	21	14	14
(Japan) H Hashimoto (Japan) N Hirata	20	22
2	(Indonesia) M Ahsan (Indonesia) H Setiawan	22	24

Second Round
Q2	(Denmark) F Colberg (Denmark) S Gravholt	19	13
7	(South Korea) Ko S-h (South Korea) Shin B-c	21	21
(China) Liu XL (China) Qiu ZH	21	21
4	(Japan) H Endo (Japan) K Hayakawa	11	12
(China) Fu HF (China) Zhang N	21	15	21
6	(Chinese Taipei) Lee S-m (Chinese Taipei) Tsai C-h	16	21	16
(China) Cai Y (China) Lu K	22	13
2	(Indonesia) M Ahsan (Indonesia) H Setiawan	24	21

Quarterfinals
7	(South Korea) Ko S-h (South Korea) Shin B-c	14	24	21
(China) Liu XL (China) Qiu ZH	21	22	10
(China) Fu HF (China) Zhang N	17	21	21
2	(Indonesia) M Ahsan (Indonesia) H Setiawan	21	19	11

Semifinals
7	(South Korea) Ko S-h (South Korea) Shin B-c	15	21
(China) Fu HF (China) Zhang N	21	23

=== Finals ===
Semifinals
1	(South Korea) Lee Yong-dae (South Korea) Yoo Yeon-seong	21	21
3	(Denmark) Mathias Boe (Denmark) Carsten Mogensen	14	17
7	(South Korea) Ko Sung-hyun (South Korea) Shin Baek-cheol	15	21
(China) Fu Haifeng (China) Zhang Nan	21	23

Final
1	(South Korea) Lee Yong-dae (South Korea) Yoo Yeon-seong	13	23
(China) Fu Haifeng (China) Zhang Nan	21	25

== Women's doubles ==
=== Seeds ===
1. (China) Bao Yixin / Tang Jinhua
2. (Denmark) Christinna Pedersen / Kamilla Rytter Juhl
3. (Japan) Misaki Matsutomo / Ayaka Takahashi
4. (China) Tian Qing / Zhao Yunlei
5. (China) Ma Jin / Tang Yuanting
6. (Japan) Reika Kakiiwa / Miyuki Maeda
7. (South Korea) Jang Ye-na / Kim So-young
8. (China) Wang Xiaoli / Yu Yang

=== Top half ===
First Round
1	(China) Bao YX (China) Tang JH	22	21
(Denmark) L Damkjær Kruse (Denmark) M Rœpke	20	13
(India) J Gutta (India) A Ponnappa	17	15
(Netherlands) E Muskens (Netherlands) S Piek	21	21
6	(Japan) R Kakiiwa (Japan) M Maeda	21	14	21
(Indonesia) S P Irawati (Indonesia) V Marissa	14	21	17
(Denmark) M Fruergård (Denmark) S Thygesen	12	18
(Germany) J Goliszewski (Germany) C Nelte	21	21
3	(Japan) M Matsutomo (Japan) A Takahashi	21	21
(Russia) E Bolotova (Russia) E Kosetskaya	11	18
(Thailand) P Supajirakul (Thailand) S Taerattanachai	13	21
(South Korea) Jung K-e (South Korea) Kim H-n	21	23
7	(South Korea) Jang Y-n (South Korea) Kim S-y	21	21
(Denmark) C Juel (Denmark) C Martens	13	12
(Denmark) J Finne-Ipsen (Denmark) R S Hansen	18	23
(Sweden) E Fabbeke (Denmark) L Grebak	21	25

Second Round
1	(China) Bao YX (China) Tang JH	21	21
(Netherlands) E Muskens (Netherlands) S Piek	17	12
6	(Japan) R Kakiiwa (Japan) M Maeda	21	21
(Germany) J Goliszewski (Germany) C Nelte	18	15
3	(Japan) M Matsutomo (Japan) A Takahashi	21	17	21
(South Korea) Jung K-e (South Korea) Kim H-n	17	21	16
7	(South Korea) Jang Y-n (South Korea) Kim S-y	21	21
(Sweden) E Fabbeke (Denmark) L Grebak	12	11

Quarterfinals
1	(China) Bao YX (China) Tang JH	21	14
6	(Japan) R Kakiiwa (Japan) M Maeda	23	21
3	(Japan) M Matsutomo (Japan) A Takahashi	21	21
3	(South Korea) Jang Y-n (South Korea) Kim S-y	12	18

Semifinals
6	(Japan) R Kakiiwa (Japan) M Maeda	18	12
3	(Japan) M Matsutomo (Japan) A Takahashi	21	21

=== Bottom half ===
First Round
(South Korea) Lee S-h (South Korea) Shin S-c	19	21	21
(Hong Kong) Chan T K (Hong Kong) Tse Y S	21	10	15
Q4	(Denmark) L Noergård (Denmark) N Vestergård	12	7
5	(China) Ma J (China) Tang YT	21	21
Q3	(Estonia) K Tolmoff (Estonia) L Vana	4	8
(South Korea) Go A-r (South Korea) Yoo H-w	21	21
Q1	(Denmark) C F Ipsen (Denmark) J D Jakobsen	8	16
4	(China) Tian Q (China) Zhao YL	21	21
(Japan) S Matsuo (Japan) M Naito	17	21	12
(Indonesia) P Z Bernadeth (Indonesia) R A Pradipta	21	14	21
Q2	(Denmark) A H Hansen (Denmark) D S Hansen	14	8
8	(China) Wang XL (China) Yu Y	21	21
(Chinese Taipei) Hsu Y-c (Chinese Taipei) Pai Y-p	18	14
(China) Luo Y (China) Luo Y	21	21
(Germany) I Herttrich (Germany) B Michels	17	15
2	(Denmark) C Pedersen (Denmark) K Rytter Juhl	21	21

Second Round
(South Korea) Lee S-h (South Korea) Shin S-c	21	14	18
5	(China) Ma J (China) Tang YT	17	21	21
(South Korea) Go A-r (South Korea) Yoo H-w	14	16
4	(China) Tian Q (China) Zhao YL	21	21
(Indonesia) P Z Bernadeth (Indonesia) R A Pradipta	19	16
8	(China) Wang XL (China) Yu Y	21	21
(China) Luo Y (China) Luo Y	15	11
2	(Denmark) C Pedersen (Denmark) K Rytter Juhl	21	21

Quarterfinals
5	(China) Ma J (China) Tang YT	21	15	21
4	(China) Tian Q (China) Zhao YL	15	21	19
8	(China) Wang XL (China) Yu Y	21	21	21
2	(Denmark) C Pedersen (Denmark) K Rytter Juhl	14	23	16

Semifinals
5	(China) Ma J (China) Tang YT	14	21	11
8	(China) Wang XL (China) Yu Yang	21	19	21

=== Finals ===
Semifinals
6	(Japan) Reika Kakiiwa (Japan) Miyuki Maeda	18	12
3	(Japan) Misaki Matsutomo (Japan) Ayaka Takahashi	21	21
5	(China) Ma Jin (China) Tang Yuanting	14	21	11
8	(China) Wang Xiaoli (China) Yu Yang	21	19	21

Final
3	(Japan) Misaki Matsutomo (Japan) Ayaka Takahashi	14	14
8	(China) Wang Xiaoli (China) Yu Yang	21	21

== Mixed doubles ==
=== Seeds ===
1. (China) Zhang Nan / Zhao Yunlei
2. (Denmark) Joachim Fischer Nielsen / Christinna Pedersen
3. (China) Xu Chen / Ma Jin
4. (Indonesia) Tantowi Ahmad / Liliyana Natsir
5. (England) Chris Adcock / Gabby Adcock
6. (South Korea) Ko Sung-hyun / Kim Ha-na
7. (Germany) Michael Fuchs / Birgit Michels
8. (Thailand) Sudket Prapakamol / Saralee Thoungthongkam

=== Top half ===
First Round
1	(China) Zhang N (China) Zhao YL	21	22
(South Korea) Shin B-c (South Korea) Jang Y-n	14	20
(Indonesia) P Jordan (Indonesia) D Susanto	21	20	24
(Hong Kong) Lee C H (Hong Kong) Chau H W	16	22	22
8	(Thailand) S Prakamol (Thailand) S Thoungthongkam	21	14	21
(Netherlands) J Arends (Netherlands) S Piek	18	21	13
Q1	(Thailand) N Puangpuapech (Thailand) P Supajirakul	19	20
(China) Liu C (China) Bao YX	21	22
3	(China) Xu C (China) Ma J	21	21
(Germany) M Schwenger (Germany) C Nelte	18	14
(Indonesia) M Kido (Indonesia) P Z Bernadeth	25	19
Q3	(Japan) K Sonoda (Japan) S Matsuo	27	21
6	(South Korea) Ko S-h (South Korea) Kim H-n	18	21	16
(Thailand) M Jongjit (Thailand) S Taerattanachai	21	17	21
Q4	(Russia) V Ivanov (India) A Ponnappa	18	18
(Hong Kong) Chan Y L (Hong Kong) Tse Y S	21	21

Second Round
1	(China) Zhang N (China) Zhao YL	21	22
(Indonesia) P Jordan (Indonesia) D Susanto	15	20
8	(Thailand) S Prakamol (Thailand) S Thoungthongkam	13	12
(China) Liu C (China) Bao YX	21	21
(China) Xu C (China) Ma J	21	21
Q3	(Japan) K Sonoda (Japan) S Matsuo	14	9
(Thailand) M Jongjit (Thailand) S Taerattanachai	21	21
(Hong Kong) Chan Y L (Hong Kong) Tse Y S	18	18

Quarterfinals
1	(China) Zhang N (China) Zhao YL
(China) Liu C (China) Bao YX	w	/	o
3	(China) Xu C (China) Ma J	22	21
(Thailand) M Jongjit (Thailand) S Taerattanachai	20	17

Semifinals
(China) Liu C (China) Bao YX	12	9
3	(China) Xu C (China) Ma J	21	21

=== Bottom half ===
First Round
(Indonesia) M Rijal (Indonesia) V Marissa	17	21	20
(Denmark) M Pieler Kolding (Denmark) K Rytter Juhl	21	17	22
(Japan) K Hayakawa (Japan) M Matsutomo	21	19	21
5	(England) C Adcock (England) G Adcock	19	21	13
(China) Lu K (China) Huang YQ	18	21	21
(Singapore) D B Chrisnanta (Singapore) V Neo Y Y	21	15	19
Q2	(Denmark) N Nohr (Denmark) S Thygesen	16	19
4	(Indonesia) T Ahmad (Indonesia) L Natsir	21	21
(Japan) H Hashimoto (Japan) M Maeda	6	14
(China) Liu YC (China) Luo Y	21	21
(Indonesia) R Widianto (Indonesia) R P Dili	21	21
7	(Germany) M Fuchs (Germany) B Michels	11	13
(Republic of Ireland) S Magee (Republic of Ireland) C Magee	12	16
(South Korea) Kim K-j (South Korea) Kim S-y	21	21
(Germany) P Käsbauer (Germany) I Herttrich	14	8
2	(Denmark) J Fischer Nielsen (Denmark) C Pedersen	21	21

Second Round
(Denmark) M Pieler Kolding (Denmark) K Rytter Juhl	21	21
(Japan) K Hayakawa (Japan) M Matsutomo	14	14
(China) Lu K (China) Huang YQ	11	12
4	(Indonesia) T Ahmad (Indonesia) L Natsir	21	21
(China) Liu YC (China) Luo Y	20	22
(Indonesia) R Widianto (Indonesia) R P Dili	22	24
(South Korea) Kim K-j (South Korea) Kim S-y	11	14
2	(Denmark) J Fischer Nielsen (Denmark) C Pedersen	21	21

Quarterfinals
(Denmark) M Pieler Kolding (Denmark) K Rytter Juhl	15	21	18
4	(Indonesia) T Ahmad (Indonesia) L Natsir	21	16	21
(Indonesia) R Widianto (Indonesia) R P Dili	21	14	21
2	(Denmark) J Fischer Nielsen (Denmark) C Pedersen	19	21	19

Semifinals
4	(Indonesia) T Ahmad (Indonesia) L Natsir	21	21
(Indonesia) R Widianto (Indonesia) R P Dili	10	15

=== Finals ===
Semifinals
(China) Liu Cheng (China) Bao Yixin	12	9
3	(China) Xu Chen (China) Ma Jin	21	21
4	(Indonesia) Tontowi Ahmad (Indonesia) Liliyana Natsir	21	21
(Indonesia) Riky Widianto (Indonesia) Richi Puspita Dili	10	15

Final
3	(China) Xu Chen (China) Ma Jin	22	21
4	(Indonesia) Tontowi Ahmad (Indonesia) Liliyana Natsir	20	15

Preceded by 2013 Denmark Super Series Premier	Denmark Super Series	Succeeded by 2015 Denmark Open Superseries Premier
Preceded by 2014 Australian Super Series	2014 BWF Super Series	Succeeded by 2014 French Open Superseries
