= 2014 French Super Series =

Badminton championships

Tournament details
- Dates: 21–26 October 2014
- Level: Super Series
- Total prize money: US$275,000
- Venue: Stade Pierre de Coubertin
- Location: Paris, France

Champions
- Men's singles: (Chinese Taipei) Chou Tien-chen
- Women's singles: (China) Wang Shixian
- Men's doubles: (Denmark) Mathias Boe (Denmark) Carsten Mogensen
- Women's doubles: (China) Wang Xiaoli (China) Yu Yang
- Mixed doubles: (Indonesia) Tontowi Ahmad (Indonesia) Liliyana Natsir

The 2014 French Super Series will be the tenth super series tournament of the 2014 BWF Super Series. The tournament will be contested in Paris, France from October 21–26, 2014 and had a total purse of $275,000. A qualification will occur to fill four places in all five disciplines of the main draws.

== Men's singles ==
=== Seeds ===
1. (Malaysia) Lee Chong Wei (withdrew)
2. (Denmark) Jan Ø. Jørgensen
3. (Japan) Kenichi Tago
4. (Indonesia) Tommy Sugiarto
5. (China) Wang Zhengming
6. (Denmark) Hans-Kristian Vittinghus
7. (Hong Kong) Hu Yun
8. (Denmark) Viktor Axelsen

=== Top half ===
First Round
PFQ	(India) S Varma	10	11
(England) R Ouseph	21	21
(Thailand) T Saensomboonsuk	21	21
(Hong Kong) Wei N	15	11
7	(Hong Kong) Hu Y	21	20	21
PFQ	(Republic of Ireland) S Evans	18	22	15
(India) Prannoy H. S.	11	21	20
(Japan) K Momota	21	15	22
3	(Japan) K Tago	11	18
(India) K Parupalli	21	21
(Chinese Taipei) Hsu J-h	10	19
(China) Tian HW	21	21
5	(China) Wang ZM	21	21
(Japan) S Sasaki	19	14
(Vietnam) Nguyễn T M	16	17
(Germany) M Zwiebler	21	21

Second Round
(England) R Ouseph	20	16
(Thailand) T Saensomboonsuk	22	21
7	(Hong Kong) Hu Y	21	12	12
(Japan) K Momota	18	21	21
(India) K Parupalli	21	21
(China) Tian HW	19	18
5	(China) Wang ZM	21	14	21
(Germany) M Zwiebler	19	21	19

Quarterfinals
(Thailand) T Saensomboonsuk	17	21	17
(Japan) K Momota	21	15	21
(India) K Parupalli	15	21	13
5	(China) Wang ZM	21	13	21

Semifinals
(Japan) K Momota	12	17
5	(China) Wang ZM	21	21

=== Bottom half ===
First Round
(India) S Kidambi	21	21
Q1	(Ukraine) D Zavadsky	10	14
(Netherlands) E Pang	18	11
6	(Denmark) H-K Vittinghus	21	21
Q4	(China) Xue S	24	21	8
Q2	(China) Chen YK	26	12	21
(Malaysia) Chong W F	21	13	13
4	(Indonesia) T Sugiarto	18	21	21
(Thailand) B Ponsana	15	13
(Japan) T Ueda	21	21
PFQ	(Hong Kong) Wong W K	11	11^{r}
8	(Denmark) V Axelsen	21	18
Q3	(Hong Kong) Ng K L	21	21
(France) B Leverdez	19	14
(Chinese Taipei) Chou T-c	25	9	21
2	(Denmark) J Ø Jørgensen	23	21	15

Second Round
(India) S Kidambi	20	16
6	(Denmark) H-K Vittinghus	22	21
Q2	(China) Chen YK	21	16	15
4	(Indonesia) T Sugiarto	15	21	21
(Japan) T Ueda	11	10
8	(Denmark) V Axelsen	21	21
Q3	(Hong Kong) Ng K L	19	17
(Chinese Taipei) Chou T-c	21	21

Quarterfinals
6	(Denmark) H-K Vittinghus	13	21	18
4	(Indonesia) T Sugiarto	21	17	21
8	(Denmark) V Axelsen	21	18	15
(Chinese Taipei) Chou T-c	12	21	21

Semifinals
4	(Indonesia) T Sugiarto	21	18	19
(Chinese Taipei) Chou T-c	14	21	21

=== Finals ===
Semifinals
(Japan) Kento Momota	12	17
5	(China) Wang Zhengming	21	21
4	(Indonesia) Tommy Sugiarto	21	18	19
(Chinese Taipei) Chou Tien-chen	14	21	21

Final
5	(China) Wang Zhengming	21	23	19
(Chinese Taipei) Chou Tien-chen	10	25	21

== Women's singles ==
=== Seeds ===
1. (China) Li Xuerui
2. (China) Wang Shixian
3. (China) Wang Yihan
4. (Thailand) Ratchanok Intanon
5. (India) Saina Nehwal
6. (Spain) Carolina Marín
7. (Chinese Taipei) Tai Tzu-ying
8. (India) P. V. Sindhu

=== Top half ===
First Round
1	(China) Li XR	21	21
(Thailand) B Ongbamrungphan	11	11
(Canada) M Li	21	17	20
(Japan) M Mitani	11	21	22
PFQ	(Republic of Ireland) C Magee	21	21
Q3	(Vietnam) Vũ TT	13	13
Q4	(Switzerland) S Jaquet	21	18	22
(Indonesia) A Firdasari	18	21	20
4	(Thailand) R Intanon	21	21
Q1	(France) D Lansac	13	9
(Hong Kong) Yip P Y	21	22
(Indonesia) L Fanetri	18	20
7	(Chinese Taipei) Tai T-y
Q2	(Japan) A Yamaguchi	W	/	O
(Japan) E Hirose	12	16
(Germany) K Schnaase	21	21

Second Round
1	(China) Li XR	21	24
(Japan) M Mitani	16	22
PFQ	(Republic of Ireland) C Magee	19	22	21
Q4	(Switzerland) S Jaquet	21	20	8
4	(Thailand) R Intanon	21	21
(Hong Kong) Yip P Y	15	16
Q2	(Japan) A Yamaguchi	21	21
(Germany) K Schnaase	16	8

Quarterfinals
1	(China) Li XR	21	21
PFQ	(Republic of Ireland) C Magee	19	13
4	(Thailand) R Intanon	22	21
Q2	(Japan) A Yamaguchi	20	17

Semifinals
1	(China) Li XR	21	21
4	(Thailand) R Intanon	18	12

=== Bottom half ===
First Round
(Indonesia) B Manuputty	8	11
(United States) BW Zhang	21	21
(Thailand) P Buranaprasertsuk	12	21	21
8	(India) P. V. Sindhu	21	18	16
(China) Liu X	21	21
(Chinese Taipei) Hsu Y-c	10	19
(Denmark) L Kjærsfeldt	16	17
3	(China) Wang YH	21	21
(Scotland) K Gilmour	13	21	21
(Chinese Taipei) Pai Y-p	21	12	16
(France) S Vignes Waran	16	9
5	(India) S Nehwal	21	21
(Japan) S Takahashi	21	21
(Bulgaria) L Zetchiri	18	8
PFQ	(Russia) N Perminova	8	12
2	(China) Wang SX	21	21

Second Round
(United States) BW Zhang	21	21
(Thailand) P Buranaprasertsuk	16	9
(China) Liu X	13	13
3	(China) Wang YH	21	21
(Scotland) K Gilmour	19	16
5	(India) S Nehwal	21	21
(Japan) S Takahashi	21	15	16
2	(China) Wang SX	16	21	21

Quarterfinals
(United States) BW Zhang	21	14
3	(China) Wang YH	23	21
5	(India) S Nehwal	19	21	15
2	(China) Wang SX	21	19	21

Semifinals
3	(China) Wang YH	12	20
2	(China) Wang SX	21	22

=== Finals ===
Semifinals
1	(China) Li Xuerui	21	21
4	(Thailand) Ratchanok Intanon	18	12
3	(China) Wang Yihan	12	20
2	(China) Wang Shixian	21	22

Final
1	(China) Li Xuerui	15	3^{r}
2	(China) Wang Shixian	21	8

== Men's doubles ==
=== Seeds ===
1. (Denmark) Mathias Boe / Carsten Mogensen
2. (Japan) Hiroki Endo / Kenichi Hayakawa
3. (Chinese Taipei) Lee Sheng-mu / Tsai Chia-hsin
4. (Indonesia) Marcus Fernaldi Gideon / Markis Kido
5. (China) Liu Xiaolong / Qiu Zihan
6. (China) Fu Haifeng / Zhang Nan
7. (China) Chai Biao / Hong Wei
8. (Thailand) Maneepong Jongjit / Nipitphon Phuangphuapet

=== Top half ===
First Round
1	(Denmark) M Boe (Denmark) C Mogensen	25	21
(China) Cai Y (China) Lu K	23	17
(Russia) V Ivanov (Russia) I Sozonov	21	21
(Japan) T Kamura (Japan) K Sonoda	19	13
7	(China) Chai B (China) Hong W	18	21	21
(Indonesia) W Nayaka (Indonesia) A Yusuf	21	18	14
(Poland) A Cwałina (Poland) P Wacha	0^{r}
(China) Kang J (China) Liu C	5
4	(Indonesia) M F Gideon (Indonesia) M Kido	21	16	21
Q1	(Philippines) P J Escueta (Philippines) R Estanislao	17	21	16
(Poland) Ł Moren (Poland) W Skudlarczyk	18	21	22
Q3	(Philippines) P G Magnaye (Philippines) P J Vivas	21	11	20
8	(Thailand) M Jongjit (Thailand) N Phuangphuapet	21	22	21
(France) B Carême (France) R Labar	7	24	12
(Indonesia) A Adistia (Indonesia) H A Gunawan	21	23
(Germany) M Schwenger (Germany) J Zurwonne	10	21

Second Round
1	(Denmark) M Boe (Denmark) C Mogensen	21	21
(Russia) V Ivanov (Russia) I Sozonov	19	13
7	(China) Chai B (China) Hong W	21	18	21
(China) Kang J (China) Liu C	9	21	14
4	(Indonesia) M F Gideon (Indonesia) M Kido	16	21	21
(Poland) Ł Moren (Poland) W Skudlarczyk	21	11	12
8	(Thailand) M Jongjit (Thailand) N Phuangphuapet	21	12	19
(Indonesia) A Adistia (Indonesia) H A Gunawan	17	21	21

Quarterfinals
1	(Denmark) M Boe (Denmark) C Mogensen	21	18	21
7	(China) Chai B (China) Hong W	15	21	15
4	(Indonesia) M F Gideon (Indonesia) M Kido	15	13
(Indonesia) A Adistia (Indonesia) H A Gunawan	21	21

Semifinals
1	(Denmark) M Boe (Denmark) C Mogensen	21	21
(Indonesia) A Adistia (Indonesia) H A Gunawan	7	18

=== Bottom half ===
First Round
(Netherlands) J Arends (Netherlands) J Maas	3
(Belgium) M Dierickx (Belgium) F Golinski	0^{r}
Q2	(Malaysia) Goh V S (Malaysia) Tan W K	21	9	21
6	(China) Fu HF (China) Zhang N	19	21	19
(India) P Chopra (India) A Dewalker	23	17	21
(China) Li JH (China) Liu YC	21	21	16
(Denmark) M Conrad-Petersen (Denmark) M Pieler Kolding	22	21
3	(Chinese Taipei) Lee S-m (Chinese Taipei) Tsai C-h	24	23
Q4	(Chinese Taipei) Chen H-l (Chinese Taipei) Wang C-l	17	16
(Japan) H Hashimoto (Japan) N Hirata	21	21
(India) M Attri (India) B S Reddy	17	14
5	(China) Liu XL (China) Qiu ZH	21	21
(Thailand) W Ampunsuwan (Thailand) P Chalardchaleam	14	19
(Indonesia) B Angriawan (Indonesia) R K Suwardi	21	21
(Germany) M Fuchs (Germany) J Schöttler	15	13
2	(Japan) H Endo (Japan) K Hayakawa	21	21

Second Round
(Netherlands) J Arends (Netherlands) J Maas	20	21	20
Q2	(Malaysia) Goh V S (Malaysia) Tan W K	22	8	22
(India) P J Chopra (India) A Dewalker	15	21	15
3	(Chinese Taipei) Lee S-m (Chinese Taipei) Tsai C-h	21	19	21
(Japan) H Hashimoto (Japan) N Hirata	21	16	21
5	(China) Liu XL (China) Qiu ZH	12	21	8
(Indonesia) B Angriawan (Indonesia) R K Suwardi	9	18
2	(Japan) H Endo (Japan) K Hayakawa	21	21

Quarterfinals
Q2	(Malaysia) Goh V S (Malaysia) Tan W K	21	18	14
3	(Chinese Taipei) Lee S-m (Chinese Taipei) Tsai C-h	19	21	21
(Japan) H Hashimoto (Japan) N Hirata	20	14
2	(Japan) H Endo (Japan) K Hayakawa	22	21

Semifinals
3	(Chinese Taipei) Lee S-m (Chinese Taipei) Tsai C-h	19	16
2	(Japan) H Endo (Japan) K Hayakawa	21	21

=== Finals ===
Semifinals
1	(Denmark) Mathias Boe (Denmark) Carsten Mogensen	21	21
(Indonesia) Andrei Adistia (Indonesia) Hendra Aprida Gunawan	7	18
3	(Chinese Taipei) Lee Sheng-mu (Chinese Taipei) Tsai Chia-hsin	19	16
2	(Japan) Hiroyuki Endo (Japan) Kenichi Hayakawa	21	21

Final
1	(Denmark) Mathias Boe (Denmark) Carsten Mogensen	18	21	21
2	(Japan) Hiroyuki Endo (Japan) Kenichi Hayakawa	21	9	7

== Women's doubles ==
=== Seeds ===
1. (China) Bao Yixin / Tang Jinhua
2. (Denmark) Christina Pedersen / Kamilla Rytter Juhl
3. (Japan) Misaki Matsutomo / Ayaka Takahashi
4. (China) Tian Qing / Zhao Yunlei
5. (China) Ma Jin / Tang Yuanting
6. (Japan) Reika Kakiiwa / Miyuki Maeda
7. (China) Wang Xiaoli / Yu Yang
8. (China) Luo Ying / Luo Yu

=== Top half ===
First Round
(Japan) S Matsuo (Japan) M Naito	21	21
(France) L Baumann (France) A Fontaine	10	12
6	(Japan) R Kakiiwa (Japan) M Maeda	21	21
Q2	(France) P Fontaine (France) J Grall	8	7
(Indonesia) S P Irawati (Indonesia) V Marissa	21	21	21
(Germany) I Herttrich (Germany) B Michels	23	15	15
3	(Japan) M Matsutomo (Japan) A Takahashi	21	21
(France) E Beaujean (France) V Faulmann	4	4
(Indonesia) M Jauhari (Indonesia) A P L Variella	13	6
(Chinese Taipei) Hsu Y-c (Chinese Taipei) Pai Y-p	21	21
5	(China) Ma J (China) Tang YT	21	9	21
(Indonesia) P Z Bernadet (Indonesia) R A Pradipta	6	21	18

Second Round
1	(China) Bao YX (China) Tang JH	21	7	21
(Japan) S Matsuo (Japan) M Naito	16	21	23
6	(Japan) R Kakiiwa (Japan) M Maeda	21	21
(Indonesia) S P Irawati (Indonesia) V Marissa	19	15
3	(Japan) M Matsutomo (Japan) A Takahashi	21	21
(Chinese Taipei) Hsu Y-c (Chinese Taipei) Pai Y-p	10	12
5	(China) Ma J (China) Tang YT	21	21
PFQ	(France) L Palermo (France) A Tran	9	6

Quarterfinals
(Japan) S Matsuo (Japan) M Naito	21	21
6	(Japan) R Kakiiwa (Japan) M Maeda	12	12
3	(Japan) M Matsutomo (Japan) A Takahashi	21	15	16
5	(China) Ma J (China) Tang YT	19	21	21

Semifinals
(Japan) S Matsuo (Japan) M Naito	21	11	14
5	(China) Ma J (China) Tang YT	19	21	21

=== Bottom half ===
First Round
(India) J Gutta (India) A Ponnappa	18	21	21
(Netherlands) E Muskens (Netherlands) S Piek	21	16	14
(France) P Le Buhanic (France) T Wignes Waran	5	8
7	(China) Wang XL (China) Yu Y	21	21
(Thailand) P Supajirakul (Thailand) S Taerattanachai	21	21
PFQ	(France) Y Hoyaux (France) F Souillard	8	7
(Indonesia) D Fitriani (Indonesia) N Melati	21	21
4	(France) M Krieger (France) M Ligneau	13	10
(France) M Batomene (France) S Guerin	11	13
(Bulgaria) G Stoeva (Bulgaria) S Stoeva	21	21
(England) H Olver (England) L Smith	9	7
8	(China) Luo Y (China) Luo Y	21	21
(Netherlands) S Barning (Netherlands) I Tabeling	21	21
(France) D Lansac (France) É Lefel	13	19
(Germany) J Goliszewski (Germany) C Nelte	7	14
2	(Denmark) C Pedersen (Denmark) K Rytter Juhl	21	21

Second Round
(India) J Gutta (India) A Ponnappa	6	8
7	(China) Wang XL (China) Yu Y	21	21
(Thailand) P Supajirakul (Thailand) S Taerattanachai	17	18
(Indonesia) D Fitriani (Indonesia) N Melati	21	21
(Bulgaria) G Stoeva (Bulgaria) S Stoeva	18	15
8	(China) Luo Y (China) Luo Y	21	21
(Netherlands) S Barning (Netherlands) I Tabeling	6	19
2	(Denmark) C Pedersen (Denmark) K Rytter Juhl	21	21

Quarterfinals
7	(China) Wang XL (China) Yu Y	21	21
(Indonesia) D Fitriani (Indonesia) N Melati	12	7
8	(China) Luo Y (China) Luo Y	21	21
2	(Denmark) C Pedersen (Denmark) K Rytter Juhl	15	10

Semifinals
7	(China) Wang XL (China) Yu Y	22	21
8	(China) Luo Y (China) Luo Y	20	7

=== Finals ===
Semifinals
(Japan) Shizuka Matsuo (Japan) Mami Naito	21	11	14
5	(China) Ma Jin (China) Tang Yuanting	19	21	21
7	(China) Wang Xiaoli (China) Yu Yang	22	21
8	(China) Luo Ying (China) Luo Yu	20	7

Final
5	(China) Ma Jin (China) Tang Yuanting	15	9
7	(China) Wang Xiaoli (China) Yu Yang	21	21

== Mixed doubles ==
=== Seeds ===
1. (China) Zhang Nan / Zhao Yunlei
2. (China) Xu Chen / Ma Jin
3. (Indonesia) Tontowi Ahmad / Liliyana Natsir
4. (England) Chris Adcock / Gabby Adcock
5. (Germany) Michael Fuchs / Birgit Michels
6. (Thailand) Sudket Prapakamol / Saralee Thungthongkam
7. (China) Lu Kai / Huang Yaqiong
8. (Singapore) Danny Bawa Chrisnanta / Vanessa Neo

=== Top half ===
First Round
PFQ	(France) R Labar (France) É Lefel	21	21
(Indonesia) M F Gideon (Indonesia) R A Pradipta	16	16
(Denmark) M Pieler Kolding (Denmark) K Rytter Juhl	21	21
(Japan) K Hayakawa (Japan) M Matsutomo	13	19
5	(Germany) M Fuchs (Germany) B Michels	21	19	21
(Thailand) M Jongjit (Thailand) S Taerattanachai	15	21	17
(China) Liu YC (China) Luo Y	20	21	19
(Japan) H Hashimoto (Japan) M Maeda	22	13	21
4	(England) C Adcock (England) G Adcock	21	21
(Indonesia) P Jordan (Indonesia) D Susanto	19	17
(Indonesia) I Fadhilah (Indonesia) W Anggraini	13	19
(China) Liu C (China) Bao YX	21	21
6	(Thailand) S Prapakamol (Thailand) S Thungthongkam	21	21
(Indonesia) M Rijal (Indonesia) V Marissa	16	19
Q4	(France) B Kersaudy (France) L Palermo	9	15
(Netherlands) J Arends (Netherlands) S Piek	21	21

Second Round
PFQ	(France) R Labar (France) É Lefel	24	13
(Denmark) M Pieler Kolding (Denmark) K Rytter Juhl	26	21
5	(Germany) M Fuchs (Germany) B Michels	21	21
(Japan) H Hashimoto (Japan) M Maeda	15	13
4	(England) C Adcock (England) G Adcock	21	21
(China) Liu C (China) Bao YX	19	17
6	(Thailand) S Prapakamol (Thailand) S Thungthongkam	16	21	15
(Netherlands) J Arends (Netherlands) S Piek	21	17	21

Quarterfinals
(Denmark) M Pieler Kolding (Denmark) K Rytter Juhl	21	21
5	(Germany) M Fuchs (Germany) B Michels	13	15
4	(England) C Adcock (England) G Adcock	15	21	22
(Netherlands) J Arends (Netherlands) S Piek	21	15	20

Semifinals
(Denmark) M Pieler Kolding (Denmark) K Rytter Juhl	17	21	19
4	(England) C Adcock (England) G Adcock	21	19	21

=== Bottom half ===
First Round
Q2	(Japan) K Sonoda (Japan) S Matsuo	16	19
Q3	(Russia) V Ivanov (India) A Ponnappa	21	21
(Denmark) N Nøhr (Denmark) S Thygesen	8	15
7	(China) Lu K (China) Huang YQ	21	21
Q1	(France) S Vincent (France) A Vanderstukken	8	16
(Republic of Ireland) S Magee (Republic of Ireland) C Magee	21	21
(Germany) P Käsbauer (Germany) I Herttrich	7	13
3	(Indonesia) T Ahmad (Indonesia) L Natsir	21	21
(Indonesia) M Kido (Indonesia) P Z Bernadet	21	21
(Germany) M Schwenger (Germany) C Nelte	15	16
(Thailand) N Phuangphuapet (Thailand) P Supajirakul	21	18	19
8	(Singapore) D B Chrisnanta (Singapore) V Neo	14	21	21
(Indonesia) A E Prasetya (Indonesia) A Saufika	23	16	21
(Netherlands) J de Ruitter (Netherlands) S Barning	21	21	14
(Denmark) J Fischer Nielsen (Denmark) M Rœpke	21	11	14
2	(China) Xu C (China) Ma J	18	21	21

Second Round
Q3	(Russia) V Ivanov (India) A Ponnappa	8	21	9
7	(China) Lu K (China) Huang YQ	21	18	21
(Republic of Ireland) S Magee (Republic of Ireland) C Magee	11	10
3	(Indonesia) T Ahmad (Indonesia) L Natsir	21	21
(Indonesia) M Kido (Indonesia) P Z Bernadet	21	21
8	(Singapore) D B Chrisnanta (Singapore) V Neo	16	19
(Indonesia) A E Prasetya (Indonesia) A Saufika	9	16
2	(China) Xu C (China) Ma J	21	21

Quarterfinals
7	(China) Lu K (China) Huang YQ	11	16
3	(Indonesia) T Ahmad (Indonesia) L Natsir	21	21
(Indonesia) M Kido (Indonesia) P Z Bernadet	6	9
2	(China) Xu C (China) Ma J	21	21

Semifinals
3	(Indonesia) T Ahmad (Indonesia) L Natsir	21	21
2	(China) Xu C (China) Ma J	17	16

=== Finals ===
Semifinals
(Denmark) Mads Pieler Kolding (Denmark) Kamilla Rytter Juhl	17	21	19
4	(England) Chris Adcock (England) Gabby Adcock	21	19	21
3	(Indonesia) Tontowi Ahmad (Indonesia) Liliyana Natsir	21	21
2	(China) Xu Chen (China) Ma Jin	17	16

Final
4	(England) Chris Adcock (England) Gabby Adcock	9	16
3	(Indonesia) Tontowi Ahmad (Indonesia) Liliyana Natsir	21	21

Preceded by 2013 French Super Series	French Open	Succeeded by 2015 French Super Series
Preceded by 2014 Denmark Super Series Premier	BWF Super Series; 2014 BWF Season	Succeeded by 2014 China Open Super Series Premier
