= 2016 Indonesia Super Series Premier =

Badminton tournament

Tournament details
- Dates: 30 May – 5 June
- Edition: 35th
- Level: Super Series Premier
- Total prize money: US$900,000
- Venue: Istora Gelora Bung Karno
- Location: Jakarta, Indonesia

Champions
- Men's singles: (Malaysia) Lee Chong Wei
- Women's singles: (Chinese Taipei) Tai Tzu-ying
- Men's doubles: (South Korea) Lee Yong-dae (South Korea) Yoo Yeon-seong
- Women's doubles: (Japan) Misaki Matsutomo (Japan) Ayaka Takahashi
- Mixed doubles: (China) Xu Chen (China) Ma Jin

The 2016 Indonesia Super Series Premier was the fifth Super Series tournament of the 2016 BWF Super Series. The tournament took place in Jakarta, Indonesia from 30 May–5 June 2016 with a total purse of $900,000.

== Men's singles ==
=== Seeds ===
1. (China) Chen Long (first round)
2. (Malaysia) Lee Chong Wei (champion)
3. (China) Lin Dan (second round)
4. (Denmark) Viktor Axelsen (first round)
5. (Denmark) Jan Ø. Jørgensen (final)
6. (China) Tian Houwei (semifinals)
7. (Chinese Taipei) Chou Tien-chen (second round)
8. (Indonesia) Tommy Sugiarto (first round)

=== Top half ===
First Round
1	(China) Chen L
PFQ	(Indonesia) S D Kuncoro	w	/	o
(Hong Kong) Hu Y	21	21
(Thailand) T Saensomboonsuk	19	17
6	(China) Tian HW	21	19	21
(South Korea) Lee D-k	15	21	15
PFQ	(Malaysia) I Z Zainuddin	10	19
(Germany) M Zwiebler	21	21
3	(China) Lin D	16	21	21
PFQ	(Malaysia) Z Zulkiffli	21	18	16
(Indonesia) J Christie	21	21
(Chinese Taipei) Hsu J-h	12	19
5	(Denmark) J Ø. Jørgensen	22	25
(Indonesia) A S Ginting	20	23
(Hong Kong) Wong W K	14	21	21
(Japan) S Sasaki	21	16	8

Second Round
PFQ	(Indonesia) S D Kuncoro	12	21	16
(Hong Kong) Hu Y	21	15	21
6	(China) Tian HW	17	21	21
(Germany) M Zwiebler	21	11	13
3	(China) Lin D	12	12
(Indonesia) J Christie	21	21
5	(Denmark) J Ø. Jørgensen	21	21
(Hong Kong) Wong W K	16	16

Quarterfinals
(Hong Kong) Hu Y	21	15	18
6	(China) Tian HW	14	21	21
(Indonesia) J Christie	21	19	14
5	(Denmark) J Ø. Jørgensen	14	21	21

Semifinals
6	(China) Tian HW	14	21	17
5	(Denmark) J Ø. Jørgensen	21	18	21

=== Bottom half ===
First Round
(England) R Ouseph	21	21	21
Q4	(Singapore) D Wong Z L	14	23	18
(Hong Kong) Wei N	21	21
8	(Indonesia) T Sugiarto	16	14
(Indonesia) I M Mustofa	21	21
Q3	(France) B Leverdez	16	10
Q2	(China) Huang YX	16	21	8
4	(Denmark) V Axelsen	21	16	4^{r}
(Denmark) H-K Vittinghus	21	23	22
(China) Wang ZM	18	25	24
(South Korea) Son W-h	14	21	19
7	(Chinese Taipei) Chou T-c	21	19	21
Q1	(Malaysia) Goh S H	19	15
(Hong Kong) Ng K L	21	21
PFQ	(India) S Verma	11	13
2	(Malaysia) Lee C W	21	21

Second Round
(England) R Ouseph	11	26	21
(Hong Kong) Wei N	21	24	15
(Indonesia) I M Mustofa	21	21
Q2	(China) Huang YX	18	15
(China) Wang ZM	22	21
7	(Chinese Taipei) Chou T-c	20	11
(Hong Kong) Ng K L	10	13
2	(Malaysia) Lee C W	21	21

Quarterfinals
(England) R Ouseph	21	12	12
(Indonesia) I M Mustofa	17	21	21
(China) Wang ZM	16	2^{r}
2	(Malaysia) Lee C W	21	9

Semifinals
(Indonesia) I M Mustofa	9	18
(Malaysia) Lee C W	21	21

=== Finals ===
Semifinals
6	(China) Tian Houwei	14	21	17
5	(Denmark) Jan Ø. Jørgensen	21	18	21
(Indonesia) Ihsan Maulana Mustofa	9	18
2	(Malaysia) Lee Chong Wei	21	21

Final
5	(Denmark) Jan Ø. Jørgensen	21	19	17
2	(Malaysia) Lee Chong Wei	17	21	21

== Women's singles ==
=== Seeds ===
1. (Spain) Carolina Marín (semifinals)
2. (Thailand) Ratchanok Intanon (first round)
3. (China) Li Xuerui (second round)
4. (China) Wang Yihan (final)
5. (Japan) Nozomi Okuhara (quarterfinals)
6. (China) Wang Shixian (semifinals)
7. (South Korea) Sung Ji-hyun (quarterfinals)
8. (India) Saina Nehwal (quarterfinals)

=== Top half ===
First Round
1	(Spain) C Marín	21	21
Q1	(Indonesia) H Desi	18	11
Q3	(Indonesia) A Yuswandari	14	14
(Japan) A Yamaguchi	21	21
8	(India) S Nehwal	21	19	21
(Chinese Taipei) Pai Y-p	11	21	15
(Indonesia) Fitriani	21	13	21
PFQ	(Indonesia) G M Tunjung	14	21	16
4	(China) Wang YH	21	21
(Canada) M Li	19	18
(Denmark) L Kjærsfeldt	21	18	21
(Indonesia) L Fanetri	12	21	19
7	(South Korea) Sung J-h	21	21
(Indonesia) H Ramadhini	17	8
(Singapore) Liang XY	22	23
(United States) I Wang	20	21

Second Round
1	(Spain) C Marín	24	21
(Japan) A Yamaguchi	22	14
8	(India) S Nehwal	21	21
(Indonesia) Fitriani	11	10
4	(China) Wang YH	21	18	21
(Denmark) L Kjærsfeldt	13	21	12
7	(South Korea) Sung J-h	21	21
(Singapore) Liang XY	17	19

Quarterfinals
1	(Spain) C Marín	24	21
8	(India) S Nehwal	22	11
4	(China) Wang YH	21	13	22
7	(South Korea) Sung J-h	18	21	20

Semifinals
1	(Spain) C Marín	21	11	17
4	(China) Wang YH	16	21	21

=== Bottom half ===
First Round
(Scotland) K Gilmour	21	21
(Japan) S Sato	13	6
Q4	(Indonesia) J F Sugiarto	8	5
5	(Japan) N Okuhara	21	21
(Indonesia) M F Kusumastuti	24	11
(Chinese Taipei) Tai T-y	26	21
PFQ	(Indonesia) R Hartawan	21	8	11
3	(China) Li XR	16	21	21
(China) He BJ	21	17	21
(Japan) M Mitani	16	21	12
(South Korea) Bae Y-j	12	21	12
6	(China) Wang SX	21	15	21
Q2	(Indonesia) F Angguni	18	21	21
(Hong Kong) Yip P Y	21	16	19
(China) Sun Y	21	21
2	(Thailand) R Intanon	15	18

Second Round
(Scotland) K Gilmour	15	8
5	(Japan) N Okuhara	21	21
(Chinese Taipei) Tai T-y	21	21
3	(China) Li XR	18	18
(China) He BJ	21	14	14
6	(China) Wang SX	13	21	21
Q2	(Indonesia) F Angguni	12	15
(China) Sun Y	21	21

Quarterfinals
5	(Japan) N Okuhara	18	21	8
(Chinese Taipei) Tai T-y	21	13	21
6	(China) Wang SX	18	21	21
(China) Sun Y	21	19	16

Semifinals
(Chinese Taipei) Tai T-y	21	21
6	(China) Wang SX	9	15

=== Finals ===
Semifinals
1	(Spain) Carolina Marín	21	11	17
4	(China) Wang Yihan	16	21	21
(Chinese Taipei) Tai Tzu-ying	21	21
6	(China) Wang Shixian	9	15

Final
4	(China) Wang Yihan	17	8
(Chinese Taipei) Tai Tzu-ying	21	21

== Men's doubles ==
=== Seeds ===
1. (South Korea) Lee Yong-dae / Yoo Yeon-seong (champion)
2. (Indonesia) Mohammad Ahsan / Hendra Setiawan (second round)
3. (China) Fu Haifeng / Zhang Nan (second round)
4. (South Korea) Kim Gi-jung / Kim Sa-rang (first round)
5. (China) Chai Biao / Hong Wei (final)
6. (South Korea) Ko Sung-hyun / Shin Baek-cheol (quarterfinals)
7. (Japan) Hiroyuki Endo / Kenichi Hayakawa (second round)
8. (Denmark) Mathias Boe / Carsten Mogensen (second round)

=== Top half ===
First Round
1	(South Korea) Lee Y-d (South Korea) Yoo Y-s	21	21
(Indonesia) A Pratama (Indonesia) R K Suwardi	14	9
(Indonesia) M F Gideon (Indonesia) K S Sukamuljo	22	21
(England) M Ellis (England) C Langridge	20	15
6	(South Korea) Ko S-h (South Korea) Shin B-c	21	21
Q3	(Indonesia) C Kristanto (Indonesia) B Maulana	11	14
(India) M Attri (India) B. S Reddy	21	21
(Philippines) P G Magnaye (Philippines) A Morada	13	16
3	(China) Fu HF (China) Zhang N	21	21
Q2	(Indonesia) W Nayaka (Indonesia) H Faizal	16	17
(Australia) M Chau (Australia) S Serasinghe	16	10
(Denmark) K Astrup (Denmark) A S Rasmussen	21	21
7	(Japan) H Endo (Japan) K Hayakawa	21	21
(Denmark) K Antonsen (Denmark) N Nohr	17	16
(China) Lu K (China) Zheng SW	21	21
(Indonesia) H A Gunawan (Indonesia) M Kido	10	14

Second Round
1	(South Korea) Lee Y-d (South Korea) Yoo Y-s	21	21
(Indonesia) M F Gideon (Indonesia) K S Sukamuljo	15	19
6	(South Korea) Ko S-h (South Korea) Shin B-c	21	21
(India) M Attri (India) B. S Reddy	18	13
3	(China) Fu HF (China) Zhang N	19	19
(Denmark) K Astrup (Denmark) A S Rasmussen	21	21
7	(Japan) H Endo (Japan) K Hayakawa	9	13
(China) Lu K (China) Zheng SW	21	21

Quarterfinals
1	(South Korea) Lee Y-d (South Korea) Yoo Y-s	21	21
6	(South Korea) Ko S-h (South Korea) Shin B-c	12	16
(Denmark) K Astrup (Denmark) A S Rasmussen	21	21
(China) Lu K (China) Zheng SW	16	19

Semifinals
1	(South Korea) Lee Y-d (South Korea) Yoo Y-s	21	21
(Denmark) K Astrup (Denmark) A S Rasmussen	16	14

=== Bottom half ===
First Round
(Denmark) M Christiansen (Denmark) D Daugaard	19	18
Q4	(Indonesia) A B Cahyono (Indonesia) A Sudrajat	21	21
(Indonesia) Hardianto (Indonesia) K A Haryanto	14	19
5	(China) Chai B (China) Hong W	21	21
(Malaysia) Koo K K (Malaysia) Tan B H	21	10	21
(Indonesia) B Angriawan (Indonesia) R A Saputro	17	21	15
(Malaysia) Goh V S (Malaysia) Tan W K	w	/	o
4	(South Korea) Kim G-j (South Korea) Kim S-r
(Belgium) M Dierickx (Belgium) F Golinski	11	6
(Japan) T Kamura (Japan) K Sonoda	21	21
(China) Li JH (China) Liu YC	16	20
8	(Denmark) M Boe (Denmark) C Mogensen	21	22
Q1	(Indonesia) F Alfian (Indonesia) M R Ardianto	19	21	25
(Denmark) M Conrad-Petersen (Denmark) M Pieler Kolding	21	14	27
(Hong Kong) Or C C (Hong Kong) Tang C M	21	23
2	(Indonesia) M Ahsan (Indonesia) H Setiwan	23	25

Second Round
Q4	(Indonesia) A B Cahyono (Indonesia) A Sudrajat	9	15
5	(China) Chai B (China) Hong W	21	21
(Malaysia) Koo K K (Malaysia) Tan B H	20	20
(Malaysia) Goh V S (Malaysia) Tan W K	22	22
(Japan) T Kamura (Japan) K Sonoda	21	27
8	(Denmark) M Boe (Denmark) C Mogensen	18	25
(Denmark) M Conrad-Petersen (Denmark) M Pieler Kolding	19	21	21
2	(Indonesia) M Ahsan (Indonesia) H Setiwan	21	13	18

Quarterfinals
5	(China) Chai B (China) Hong W	21	21
(Malaysia) Goh V S (Malaysia) Tan W K	18	17
(Japan) T Kamura (Japan) K Sonoda	13	12
(Denmark) M Conrad-Petersen (Denmark) M Pieler Kolding	21	21

Semifinals
5	(China) Chai B (China) Hong W	18	21	21
(Denmark) M Conrad-Petersen (Denmark) M Pieler Kolding	21	16	14

=== Finals ===
Semifinals
1	(South Korea) Lee Yong-dae (South Korea) Yoo Yeon-seong	21	21
(Denmark) Kim Astrup (Denmark) Anders Skaarup Rasmussen	16	14
5	(China) Chai Biao (China) Hong Wei	18	21	21
(Denmark) Mads Conrad-Petersen (Denmark) Mads Pieler Kolding	21	16	14

Final
1	(South Korea) Lee Yong-dae (South Korea) Yoo Yeon-seong	13	21	21
5	(China) Chai Biao (China) Hong Wei	21	13	16

== Women's doubles ==
=== Seeds ===
1. (Japan) Misaki Matsutomo / Ayaka Takahashi (champion)
2. (Indonesia) Nitya Krishinda Maheswari / Greysia Polii (second round)
3. (China) Tang Yuanting / Yu Yang (final)
4. (China) Tian Qing / Zhao Yunlei (second round)
5. (Denmark) Christinna Pedersen / Kamilla Rytter Juhl (first round)
6. (South Korea) Jung Kyung-eun / Shin Seung-chan (second round)
7. (China) Luo Ying / Luo Yu (first round)
8. (South Korea) Chang Ye-na / Lee So-hee (quarterfinals)

=== Top half ===
First Round
(Russia) A Tyurina (Russia) D Tyurina	9	4
(Indonesia) A Rahayu (Indonesia) J F Sugiarto	21	21
5	(Denmark) C Pedersen (Denmark) K Rytter Juhl	21	21	10
(China) Huang YQ (China) Tang JH	23	14	21
(Indonesia) F D Kusuma (Indonesia) R Sugiarto	7	22	10
(India) J Gutta (India) A Ponnappa	21	20	21
(Indonesia) T R Nuraidah (Indonesia) R A Pradipta	15	21	21
(Japan) S Matsuo (Japan) M Naito	21	19	19
7	(China) Luo Y (China) Luo Y
(Indonesia) R S Putri (Indonesia) F A Rahardja	w	/	o
(Indonesia) N Herloardjo (Indonesia) A C Mandang	11	7
(Netherlands) E Muskens (Netherlands) S Piek	21	21

Second Round
1	(Japan) M Matsutomo (Japan) A Takahashi	21	21
(Indonesia) A Rahayu (Indonesia) J F Sugiarto	12	14
(China) Huang YQ (China) Tang JH	21	21
(India) J Gutta (India) A Ponnappa	9	18
4	(China) Tian Q (China) Zhao YL	21	17	18
(Indonesia) T R Nuraidah (Indonesia) R A Pradipta	17	21	21
(Indonesia) R S Putri (Indonesia) F A Rahardja	14	9
(Netherlands) E Muskens (Netherlands) S Piek	21	21

Quarterfinals
1	(Japan) M Matsutomo (Japan) A Takahashi	11	22	21
(China) Huang YQ (China) Tang JH	21	20	14
(Indonesia) T R Nuraidah (Indonesia) R A Pradipta	21	22	23
(Netherlands) E Muskens (Netherlands) S Piek	10	24	25

Semifinals
1	(Japan) M Matsutomo (Japan) A Takahashi	21	21
(Netherlands) E Muskens (Netherlands) S Piek	10	18

=== Bottom half ===
First Round
(Indonesia) A Emanuela (Indonesia) S F S Ramadhanti	16	21
(Denmark) M Fruergaard (Denmark) S Thygesen	21	23
(Indonesia) M I Cindiani (Indonesia) F V D Gani	10	13
8	(South Korea) Chang Y-n (South Korea) Lee S-h	21	21
(Indonesia) S D Augustia (Indonesia) K Dewi	11	10
(Australia) S Mapasa (Australia) G Somerville	21	21
(Indonesia) K N Hanadia (Indonesia) D T Permatasari	10	7
3	(China) Tang YT (China) Yu Y	21	21
(Japan) N Fukuman (Japan) K Yonao	12	10
(Indonesia) A S Awanda (Indonesia) N K Mahadewi Istirani	21	21
(Indonesia) L A Kusumawati (Indonesia) V Pranasa
6	(South Korea) Jung K-e (South Korea) Shin S-c	w	/	o
(Malaysia) Vivian Hoo K M (Malaysia) Woon K W	21	21
(Indonesia) D D Haris (Indonesia) R E Putri Sari	19	14

Second Round
(Denmark) M Fruergaard (Denmark) S Thygesen	16	12
8	(South Korea) Chang Y-n (South Korea) Lee S-h	21	21
(Australia) S Mapasa (Australia) G Somerville	13	11
3	(China) Tang YT (China) Yu Y	21	21
(Indonesia) A S Awanda (Indonesia) N K Mahadewi Istirani	21	19	21
6	(South Korea) Jung K-e (South Korea) Shin S-c	19	21	19
(Malaysia) Vivian Hoo K M (Malaysia) Woon K W	21	21
2	(Indonesia) N K Maheswari (Indonesia) G Polii	17	19

Quarterfinals
8	(South Korea) Chang Y-n (South Korea) Lee S-h	17	17
3	(China) Tang YT (China) Yu Y	21	21
(Indonesia) A S Awanda (Indonesia) N K Mahadewi Istirani	14	19
(Malaysia) Vivian Hoo K M (Malaysia) Woon K W	21	21

Semifinals
3	(China) Tang YT (China) Yu Y	21	21
(Malaysia) Vivian Hoo K M (Malaysia) Woon K W	15	9

=== Finals ===
Semifinals
1	(Japan) Misaki Matsutomo (Japan) Ayaka Takahashi	21	21
(Netherlands) Eefje Muskens (Netherlands) Selena Piek	10	18
3	(China) Tang Yuanting (China) Yu Yang	21	21
(Malaysia) Vivian Hoo Kah Mun (Malaysia) Woon Khe Wei	15	9

Final
1	(Japan) Misaki Matsutomo (Japan) Ayaka Takahashi	21	8	21
3	(China) Tang Yuanting (China) Yu Yang	15	21	15

== Mixed doubles ==
=== Seeds ===
1. (China) Zhang Nan / Zhao Yunlei (semifinals)
2. (Indonesia) Tontowi Ahmad / Liliyana Natsir (second round)
3. (South Korea) Ko Sung-hyun / Kim Ha-na (final)
4. (Denmark) Joachim Fischer Nielsen / Christinna Pedersen (quarterfinals)
5. (China) Xu Chen / Ma Jin (champion)
6. (China) Liu Cheng / Bao Yixin (quarterfinals)
7. (England) Chris Adcock / Gabrielle Adcock (first round)
8. (Indonesia) Praveen Jordan / Debby Susanto (first round)

=== Top half ===
First Round
1	(China) Zhang N (China) Zhao YL	21	21
(Malaysia) Chan P S (Malaysia) Goh L Y	18	17
(Indonesia) R Widianto (Indonesia) P R Dili	21	14	21
(Hong Kong) Lee C H (Hong Kong) Chau H W	13	21	18
7	(England) C Adcock (England) G Adcock	22	21	16
(Indonesia) A E Prasetya (Indonesia) A Saufika	24	18	21
(Netherlands) J Arends (Netherlands) S Piek	21	21
(South Korea) Yoo Y-s (South Korea) Chang Y-n	19	13
3	(South Korea) Ko S-h (South Korea) Kim H-n	21	21
(Indonesia) E Subaktiar (Indonesia) G E Widjaja	18	15
(Japan) K Kazuno (Japan) A Kurihara	21	17	21
(South Korea) Kim G-j (South Korea) Shin S-c	11	21	18
6	(China) Liu C (China) Bao YX	21	21
(South Korea) Lee Y-d (South Korea) Lee S-h	19	19
(Indonesia) M Kido (Indonesia) P Z Bernadeth	9	9
(China) Liu YC (China) Tang JH	21	21

Second Round
1	(China) Zhang N (China) Zhao YL	18	21	21
(Indonesia) R Widianto (Indonesia) P R Dili	21	16	13
(Indonesia) A E Prasetya (Indonesia) A Saufika	21	21
(Netherlands) J Arends (Netherlands) S Piek	17	8
3	(South Korea) Ko S-h (South Korea) Kim H-n	27	21
(Japan) K Kazuno (Japan) A Kurihara	25	19
6	(China) Liu C (China) Bao YX	21	21
(China) Liu YC (China) Tang JH	17	16

Quarterfinals
1	(China) Zhang N (China) Zhao YL	21	10	21
(Indonesia) A E Prasetya (Indonesia) A Saufika	11	21	14
3	(South Korea) Ko S-h (South Korea) Kim H-n	21	22
6	(China) Liu C (China) Bao YX	17	20

Semifinals
1	(China) Zhang N (China) Zhao YL	14	17
3	(South Korea) Ko S-h (South Korea) Kim H-n	21	21

=== Bottom half ===
First Round
(Japan) K Sonoda (Japan) N Fukuman	22	25
(Denmark) N Nohr (Denmark) S Thygesen	20	23
(Indonesia) H Faizal (Indonesia) S D Aulia	16	16
5	(China) Xu C (China) Ma J	21	21
Q1	(Indonesia) Ardiansyah (Indonesia) D T Permatasari	9	7
(Indonesia) R Alexander (Indonesia) M D Oktaviani	21	21
(China) Zheng SW (China) Chen QC	17	19
4	(Denmark) J Fischer Nielsen (Denmark) C Pedersen	21	21
Q3	(India) M Attri (India) A Ponnappa	14	25
(Singapore) Terry Hee Y K (Singapore) Tan W T	21	27
(China) Lu K (China) Huang YQ	21	21
8	(Indonesia) P Jordan (Indonesia) D Susanto	15	10
(Hong Kong) Tang C M (Hong Kong) Tse Y S	15	18
Q2	(Denmark) K Astrup (Denmark) L Kjaersfeldt	21	21
Q4	(Australia) S Serasinghe (Australia) S Mapasa	10	6
2	(Indonesia) T Ahmad (Indonesia) L Natsir	21	21

Second Round
(Japan) K Sonoda (Japan) N Fukuman	13	12
5	(China) Xu C (China) Ma J	21	21
(Indonesia) R Alexander (Indonesia) M D Oktaviani	9	16
4	(Denmark) J Fischer Nielsen (Denmark) C Pedersen	21	21
(Singapore) Terry Hee Y K (Singapore) Tan W T	6	13
(China) Lu K (China) Huang YQ	21	21
Q2	(Denmark) K Astrup (Denmark) L Kjaersfeldt	21	21
2	(Indonesia) T Ahmad (Indonesia) L Natsir	19	17

Quarterfinals
5	(China) Xu C (China) Ma J	18	21	21
4	(Denmark) J Fischer Nielsen (Denmark) C Pedersen	21	19	19
(China) Lu K (China) Huang YQ	21	21
Q2	(Denmark) K Astrup (Denmark) L Kjaersfeldt	14	14

Semifinals
5	(China) Xu C (China) Ma J	21	21
(China) Lu K (China) Huang YQ	15	18

=== Finals ===
Semifinals
1	(China) Zhang Nan (China) Zhao Yunlei	14	17
3	(South Korea) Ko Sung-hyun (South Korea) Kim Ha-na	21	21
5	(China) Xu Chen (China) Ma Jin	21	21
(China) Lu Kai (China) Huang Yaqiong	15	18

Final
3	(South Korea) Ko Sung-hyun (South Korea) Kim Ha-na	15	21	13
5	(China) Xu Chen (China) Ma Jin	21	16	21

== Sponsorships ==
- Bank BCA
- Djarum
- Toyota
- Samsung
- Konimex
- 100 Plus
- Li-Ning
- Victor

Preceded by 2015 Indonesia Super Series Premier	Indonesia Open	Succeeded by 2017 Indonesia Super Series Premier
Preceded by 2016 Singapore Super Series	BWF Super Series; 2016 BWF Season	Succeeded by 2016 Australian Super Series
