= Badminton at the 2016 Summer Olympics – Women's doubles =

Women's doubles at the Games of the XXXI Olympiad
- Venue: Riocentro - Pavilion 4
- Date: 11–18 August 2016
- Competitors: 32 from 14 nations

Medalists
1st place, gold medalist(s)		Misaki Matsutomo; Ayaka Takahashi	Japan
2nd place, silver medalist(s)		Christinna Pedersen; Kamilla Rytter Juhl	Denmark
3rd place, bronze medalist(s)		Jung Kyung-eun; Shin Seung-chan	South Korea

The badminton women's doubles tournament at the 2016 Summer Olympics took place from 11 to 17 August at Riocentro - Pavilion 4. The seeding was decided on 21 July 2016.

Japan's Misaki Matsutomo and Ayaka Takahashi defeated Denmark's Christinna Pedersen and Kamilla Rytter Juhl 18–21, 21–9, 21–19, to win the gold medal in women's doubles badminton at the 2016 Summer Olympics. It was Japan's first gold medal in Olympics badminton, and their win marked the first time since the debut of badminton as an Olympic sport in 1992 that a non-Chinese women's doubles team won the event. In the bronze-medal match, South Korea's Jung Kyung-eun and Shin Seung-chan defeated China's Tang Yuanting and Yu Yang 21–8, 21–17, marking the first time in Olympic badminton history that a Chinese team failed to podium in the women's doubles event.

== Competition format ==
The tournament started with a group phase round-robin followed by a knockout stage.

== Seeds ==
A total of 4 pairs were given seeds.

1. Misaki Matsutomo / Ayaka Takahashi (JPN) (gold medalists)
2. Tang Yuanting / Yu Yang (CHN) (fourth place)
3. Nitya Krishinda Maheswari / Greysia Polii (INA) (quarter-finals)
4. Jung Kyung-eun / Shin Seung-chan (KOR) (bronze medalists)

== Results ==
=== Group stage ===
==== Group A ====
Team	Pld	W	L	SW	SL	Pts
Misaki Matsutomo / Ayaka Takahashi (JPN)	3	3	0	6	0	3
Eefje Muskens / Selena Piek (NED)	3	2	1	4	3	2
Puttita Supajirakul / Sapsiree Taerattanachai (THA)	3	1	2	2	4	1
Jwala Gutta / Ashwini Ponnappa (IND)	3	0	3	1	6	0

Team 1	Score	Team 2
11 August, 08:00
M Matsutomo / A Takahashi (JPN)	21–15; 21–10	J Gutta / A Ponnappa (IND)
11 August, 15:55
E Muskens / S Piek (NED)	21–13; 22–20	P Supajirakul / S Taerattanachai (THA)
12 August, 08:25
M Matsutomo / A Takahashi (JPN)	21–15; 21–15	P Supajirakul / S Taerattanachai (THA)
12 August, 09:00
E Muskens / S Piek (NED)	21–16; 16–21; 21–17	J Gutta / A Ponnappa (IND)
13 August, 08:00
M Matsutomo / A Takahashi (JPN)	21–9; 21–11	E Muskens / S Piek (NED)
13 August, 10:45
P Supajirakul / S Taerattanachai (THA)	21–17; 21–15	J Gutta / A Ponnappa (IND)

==== Group B ====
Team	Pld	W	L	SW	SL	PW	PL	Pts
Jung Kyung-eun / Shin Seung-chan (KOR)	3	2	1	4	2	118	92	2
Christinna Pedersen / Kamilla Rytter Juhl (DEN)	3	2	1	4	2	113	91	2
Luo Ying / Luo Yu (CHN)	3	2	1	4	2	108	100	2
Eva Lee / Paula Lynn Obañana (USA)	3	0	3	0	6	70	126	0

Team 1	Score	Team 2
11 August, 09:35
C Pedersen / K Rytter Juhl (DEN)	11–21; 18–21	Luo Y / Luo Y (CHN)
11 August, 20:30
Jung K-e / Shin S-c (KOR)	21–14; 21–12	E Lee / P L Obañana (USA)
12 August, 15:55
C Pedersen / K Rytter Juhl (DEN)	21–9; 21–6	E Lee / P L Obañana (USA)
12 August, 19:30
Jung K-e / Shin S-c (KOR)	21–10; 21–14	Luo Y / Luo Y (CHN)
13 August, 15:55
Jung K-e / Shin S-c (KOR)	16–21; 18–21	C Pedersen / K Rytter Juhl (DEN)
13 August, 19:30
Luo Y / Luo Y (CHN)	21–14; 21–15	E Lee / P L Obañana (USA)

==== Group C ====
Team	Pld	W	L	SW	SL	Pts
Nitya Krishinda Maheswari / Greysia Polii (INA)	3	3	0	6	0	3
Vivian Hoo Kah Mun / Woon Khe Wei (MAS)	3	2	1	4	2	2
Heather Olver / Lauren Smith (GBR)	3	1	2	2	5	1
Poon Lok Yan / Tse Ying Suet (HKG)	3	0	3	1	6	0

Team 1	Score	Team 2
11 August, 10:10
N K Maheswari / G Polii (INA)	21–9; 21–11	Poon L Y / Tse Y S (HKG)
11 August, 11:55
Vivian Hoo K M / Woon K W (MAS)	21–17; 24–22	H Olver / L Smith (GBR)
12 August, 10:10
Vivian Hoo K M / Woon K W (MAS)	21–15; 21–13	Poon L Y / Tse Y S (HKG)
12 August, 15:30
N K Maheswari / G Polii (INA)	21–10; 21–13	H Olver / L Smith (GBR)
13 August, 09:35
N K Maheswari / G Polii (INA)	21–19; 21–19	Vivian Hoo K M / Woon K W (MAS)
13 August, 21:05
H Olver / L Smith (GBR)	21–17; 18–21; 21–16	Poon L Y / Tse Y S (HKG)

==== Group D ====
Team	Pld	W	L	SW	SL	Pts
Chang Ye-na / Lee So-hee (KOR)	3	3	0	6	2	3
Tang Yuanting / Yu Yang (CHN)	3	2	1	5	2	2
Gabriela Stoeva / Stefani Stoeva (BUL)	3	1	2	2	4	1
Johanna Goliszewski / Carla Nelte (GER)	3	0	3	1	6	0

Team 1	Score	Team 2
11 August, 15:30
Chang Y-n / Lee S-h (KOR)	24–22; 21–15	G Stoeva / S Stoeva (BUL)
11 August, 15:30
Tang YT / Yu Y (CHN)	21–10; 21–11	J Goliszewski / C Nelte (GER)
12 August, 10:10
Chang Y-n / Lee S-h (KOR)	21–18; 18–21; 21–17	J Goliszewski / C Nelte (GER)
12 August, 15:55
Tang YT / Yu Y (CHN)	21–14; 21–11	G Stoeva / S Stoeva (BUL)
13 August, 08:00
Tang YT / Yu Y (CHN)	18–21; 21–14; 11–21	Chang Y-n / Lee S-h (KOR)
13 August, 20:30
G Stoeva / S Stoeva (BUL)	21–14; 21–19	J Goliszewski / C Nelte (GER)

=== Finals ===
Quarter-finals
A1	Misaki Matsutomo (JPN); Ayaka Takahashi (JPN)	21	18	21
C2	Vivian Hoo Kah Mun (MAS); Woon Khe Wei (MAS)	16	21	9
B1	Jung Kyung-eun (KOR); Shin Seung-chan (KOR)	21	20	21
A2	Eefje Muskens (NED); Selena Piek (NED)	13	22	14
D2	Tang Yuanting (CHN); Yu Yang (CHN)	21	21
C1	Nitya Krishinda Maheswari (INA); Greysia Polii (INA)	11	14
B2	Christinna Pedersen (DEN); Kamilla Rytter Juhl (DEN)	28	18	21
D1	Chang Ye-na (KOR); Lee So-hee (KOR)	26	21	15

Semi-finals
A1	Misaki Matsutomo (JPN); Ayaka Takahashi (JPN)	21	21
B1	Jung Kyung-eun (KOR); Shin Seung-chan (KOR)	16	15
D2	Tang Yuanting (CHN); Yu Yang (CHN)	16	21	19
B2	Christinna Pedersen (DEN); Kamilla Rytter Juhl (DEN)	21	14	21

Final
A1	Misaki Matsutomo (JPN); Ayaka Takahashi (JPN)	18	21	21
B2	Christinna Pedersen (DEN); Kamilla Rytter Juhl (DEN)	21	9	19
Bronze-medal match
B1	Jung Kyung-eun (KOR); Shin Seung-chan (KOR)	21	21
D2	Tang Yuanting (CHN); Yu Yang (CHN)	8	17
