= Ayaka Takahashi =

Japanese badminton player (born 1990)

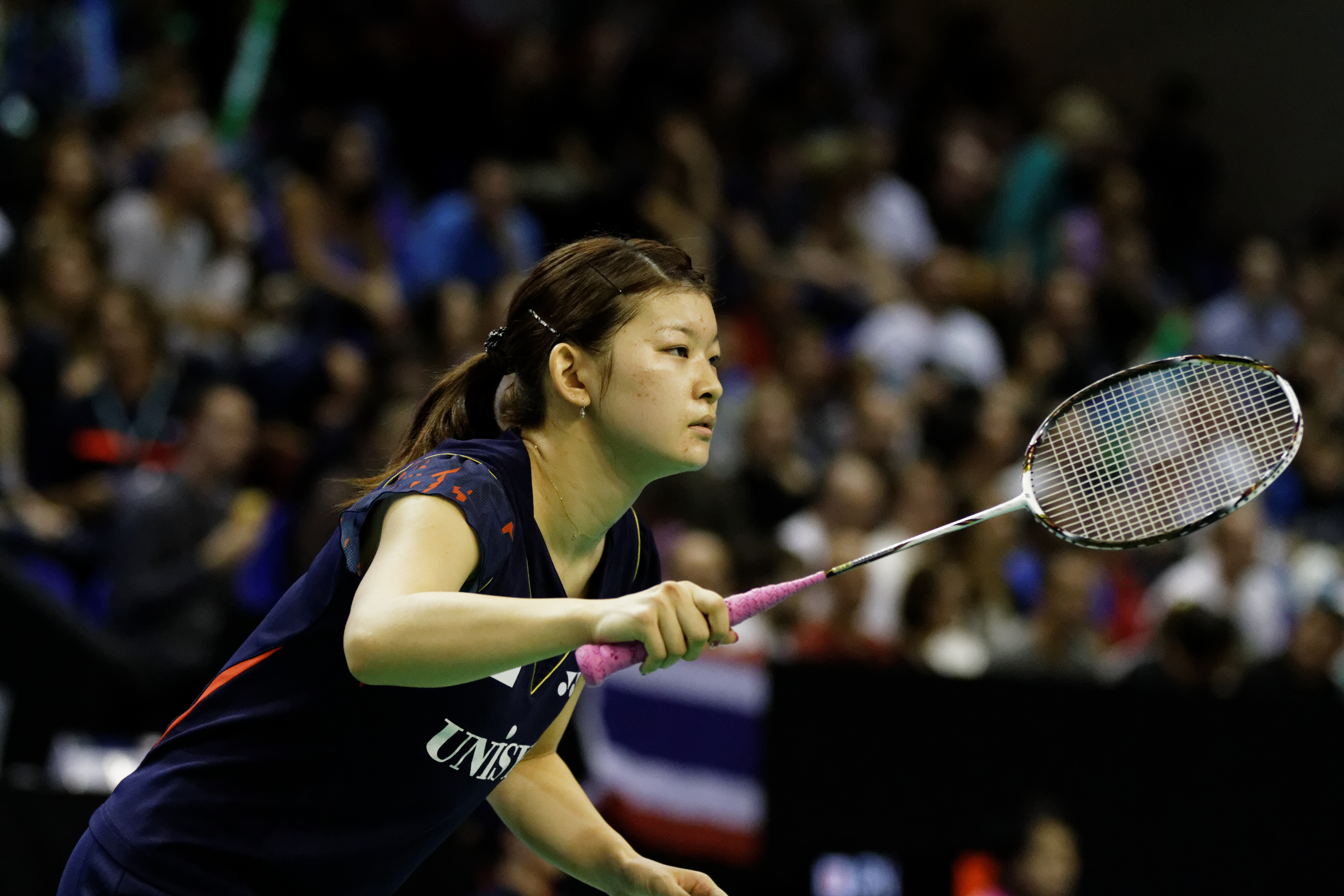
- Takahashi at the 2013 French Super Series

Personal information
- Born: 19 April 1990 (age 36) Kashihara, Nara, Japan
- Height: 1.64 m (5 ft 5 in)
- Spouse: Yuki Kaneko (m. 2020)

Sport
- Country: Japan
- Sport: Badminton
- Handedness: Right
- Retired: 31 August 2020

Women's doubles
- Highest ranking: 1 (with Misaki Matsutomo, 20 October 2014)
- BWF profile
Medal record
Women's badminton
Representing Japan
Olympic Games
Gold medal – first place	2016 Rio de Janeiro	Women's doubles
World Championships
Bronze medal – third place	2017 Glasgow	Women's doubles
Sudirman Cup
Silver medal – second place	2015 Donggguan	Mixed team
Silver medal – second place	2019 Nanning	Mixed team
Bronze medal – third place	2017 Gold Coast	Mixed team
Uber Cup
Gold medal – first place	2018 Bangkok	Women's team
Silver medal – second place	2014 New Delhi	Women's team
Bronze medal – third place	2012 Wuhan	Women's team
Bronze medal – third place	2016 Kunshan	Women's team
Asian Games
Gold medal – first place	2018 Jakarta–Palembang	Women's team
Silver medal – second place	2014 Incheon	Women's doubles
Silver medal – second place	2018 Jakarta–Palembang	Women's doubles
Bronze medal – third place	2014 Incheon	Women's team
Asian Championships
Gold medal – first place	2016 Wuhan	Women's doubles
Gold medal – first place	2017 Wuhan	Women's doubles
Silver medal – second place	2018 Wuhan	Women's doubles
Bronze medal – third place	2015 Wuhan	Women's doubles
Asia Mixed Team Championships
Gold medal – first place	2017 Ho Chi Minh	Mixed team
Asia Team Championships
Gold medal – first place	2018 Alor Setar	Women's team
Silver medal – second place	2016 Hyderabad	Women's team

Ayaka Takahashi (高橋 礼華, Takahashi Ayaka; born 19 April 1990) is a retired Japanese badminton player who was affiliated with Unisys badminton team. She is an Olympic Games gold medalist, two-time Asian Champion, two-time Asian Games silver medalist, and World Championship bronze medalist.

Playing for the Unisys team with her regular partner Misaki Matsutomo in the women's doubles, she won five National Championships titles. In the international event, Takahashi and Matsutomo were ranked world number ones in October 2014. They won numerous international titles, including the year-end tournament finals in 2014 and 2018; the historical All England Open in 2016; the Olympic Games in 2016; and also the Asian Championships in 2016 and 2017. The duo won the Badminton World Federation's Female Player of the Year award in 2016.

Takahashi was also a member of the victorious Japanese team at the 2017 Asia Mixed Team Championships and of the victorious women's team at the 2018 Asia Team Championships, 2018 Asian Games, and the 2018 Uber Cup.

== Career ==
In 2016, Takahashi and Misaki Matsutomo won the women's doubles gold medal at the Summer Olympics in Rio de Janeiro, Brazil, became the first ever Japan's to win an Olympic badminton gold medal. She and her women's doubles partner Matsutomo also honored with the Female Player of the Year award. They are playing together for more than ten years, ever since they were schoolmates. Takahashi and Matsutomo became the first pair from outside China to win the women's Olympic doubles title since the 1996 Atlanta Games, giving Japan its second medal in the event after Mizuki Fujii and Reika Kakiiwa took silver at the 2012 London Olympic Games.

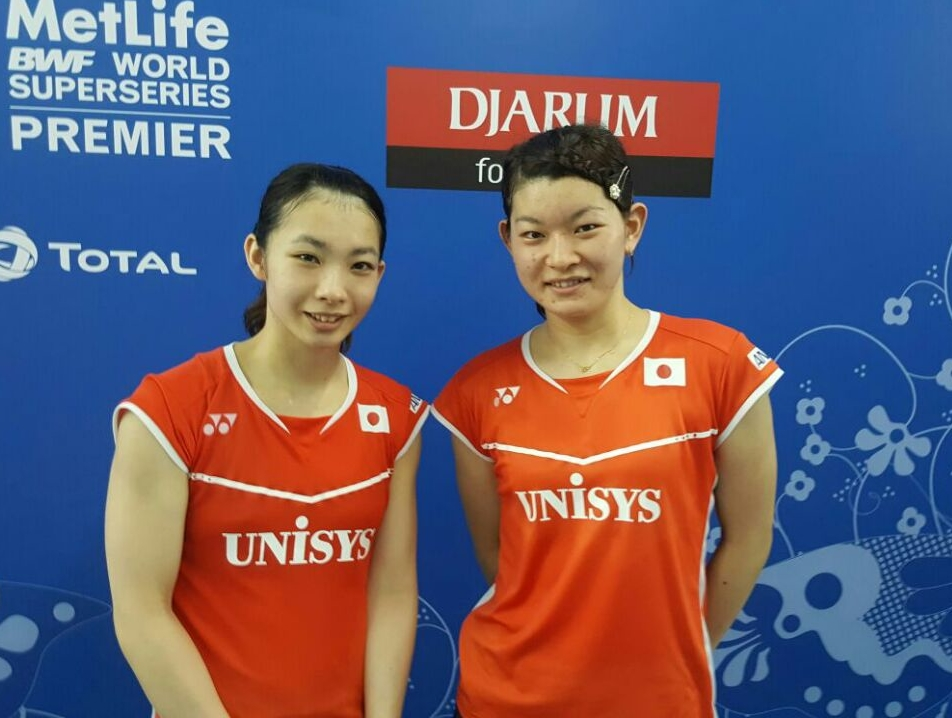
Takahashi (right) and Matsutomo at the 2016 Indonesia Super Series Premier

Takahashi announced her retirement in an online conference on 19 August 2020, and officially left the national and Unisys team at the end of August.

== Personal life ==
Takahashi is the older sister of Sayaka Takahashi, a singles badminton player. In 2020, Ayaka announced that she had married Yuki Kaneko, a teammate in both the Japanese national and Unisys teams. Kaneko is also Matsutomo's mixed doubles partner. Takahashi announced the birth of her first child, a daughter, on her Instagram on 23 February 2022.

== Awards and nominations ==
Award	Year	Category	Result	Ref.
BWF Awards	2016	Female Player of the Year with Misaki Matsutomo	Won	
Medal with Purple Ribbon awarded by the Emperor of Japan	2016	Individual Sports with Misaki Matsutomo	Won	
Nara Prefectural Honour Award	2016	Athletes	Won	

== Achievements ==
=== Olympic Games ===
Women's doubles
Year	Venue	Partner	Opponent	Score	Result	Ref.
2016	Riocentro - Pavilion 4 Rio de Janeiro, Brazil	(Japan) Misaki Matsutomo	(Denmark) Christinna Pedersen (Denmark) Kamilla Rytter Juhl	18–21, 21–9, 21–19	Gold	

=== World Championships ===
Women's doubles
Year	Venue	Partner	Opponent	Score	Result	Ref.
2017	Emirates Arena; Glasgow, Scotland	(Japan) Misaki Matsutomo	(China) Chen Qingchen (China) Jia Yifan	17–21, 15–21	Bronze	

=== Asian Games ===
Women's doubles
Year	Venue	Partner	Opponent	Score	Result	Ref.
2014	Gyeyang Gymnasium; Incheon, South Korea	(Japan) Misaki Matsutomo	(Indonesia) Nitya Krishinda Maheswari (Indonesia) Greysia Polii	15–21, 9–21	Silver	
2018	Istora Gelora Bung Karno; Jakarta, Indonesia	(Japan) Misaki Matsutomo	(China) Chen Qingchen (China) Jia Yifan	20–22, 20–22	Silver	

=== Asian Championships ===
Women's doubles
Year	Venue	Partner	Opponent	Score	Result	Ref.
2015	Wuhan Sports Center Gymnasium; Wuhan, China	(Japan) Misaki Matsutomo	(China) Wang Xiaoli (China) Yu Yang	18–21, 21–18, 15–21	Bronze	
2016	Wuhan Sports Center Gymnasium, Wuhan, China	(Japan) Misaki Matsutomo	(Japan) Naoko Fukuman (Japan) Kurumi Yonao	21–13, 21–15	Gold	
2017	Wuhan Sports Center Gymnasium, Wuhan, China	(Japan) Misaki Matsutomo	(South Korea) Kim Hye-rin (South Korea) Yoo Hae-won	21–19, 16–21, 21–10	Gold	
2018	Wuhan Sports Center Gymnasium, Wuhan, China	(Japan) Misaki Matsutomo	(Japan) Yuki Fukushima (Japan) Sayaka Hirota	18–21, 21–18, 15–21	Silver	

=== BWF World Tour (6 titles, 6 runners-up) ===
The BWF World Tour, which was announced on 19 March 2017 and implemented in 2018, is a series of elite badminton tournaments sanctioned by the Badminton World Federation (BWF). The BWF World Tour is divided into levels of World Tour Finals, Super 1000, Super 750, Super 500, Super 300 (part of the HSBC World Tour), and the BWF Tour Super 100.

Women's doubles
Year	Tournament	Level	Partner	Opponent	Score	Result	Ref.
2018	Indonesia Masters	Super 500	(Japan) Misaki Matsutomo	(Indonesia) Greysia Polii (Indonesia) Apriyani Rahayu	21–17, 21–12	(gold) Winner	
2018	Malaysia Open	Super 750	(Japan) Misaki Matsutomo	(China) Chen Qingchen (China) Jia Yifan	21–12, 21–12	(gold) Winner	
2018	Thailand Open	Super 500	(Japan) Misaki Matsutomo	(Indonesia) Greysia Polii (Indonesia) Apriyani Rahayu	13–21, 10–21	(silver) Runner-up	
2018	China Open	Super 1000	(Japan) Misaki Matsutomo	(Japan) Mayu Matsumoto (Japan) Wakana Nagahara	21–16, 21–12	(gold) Winner	
2018	Korea Open	Super 500	(Japan) Misaki Matsutomo	(Japan) Yuki Fukushima (Japan) Sayaka Hirota	21–11, 21–18	(gold) Winner	
2018	BWF World Tour Finals	World Tour Finals	(Japan) Misaki Matsutomo	(South Korea) Lee So-hee (South Korea) Shin Seung-chan	21–12, 22–20	(gold) Winner	
2019	Indonesia Masters	Super 500	(Japan) Misaki Matsutomo	(South Korea) Kim So-yeong (South Korea) Kong Hee-yong	21–19, 21–15	(gold) Winner	
2019	German Open	Super 300	(Japan) Misaki Matsutomo	(China) Du Yue (China) Li Yinhui	20–22, 15–21	(silver) Runner-up	
2019	New Zealand Open	Super 300	(Japan) Misaki Matsutomo	(South Korea) Kim So-yeong (South Korea) Kong Hee-yong	15–21, 18–21	(silver) Runner-up	
2019	Indonesia Open	Super 1000	(Japan) Misaki Matsutomo	(Japan) Yuki Fukushima (Japan) Sayaka Hirota	16–21, 18–21	(silver) Runner-up	
2019	China Open	Super 1000	(Japan) Misaki Matsutomo	(China) Chen Qingchen (China) Jia Yifan	14–21, 18–21	(silver) Runner-up	
2019	Korea Masters	Super 300	(Japan) Misaki Matsutomo	(Japan) Nami Matsuyama (Japan) Chiharu Shida	21–15, 17–21, 18–21	(silver) Runner-up	

=== BWF Superseries (9 titles, 13 runners-up) ===
The BWF Superseries, which was launched on 14 December 2006 and implemented in 2007, was a series of elite badminton tournaments, sanctioned by the Badminton World Federation (BWF). BWF Superseries levels were Superseries and Superseries Premier. A season of Superseries consisted of twelve tournaments around the world that had been introduced since 2011. Successful players were invited to the Superseries Finals, which were held at the end of each year.

Women's doubles
Year	Tournament	Partner	Opponent	Score	Result	Ref.
2012	Denmark Open	(Japan) Misaki Matsutomo	(China) Ma Jin (China) Tang Jinhua	8–21, 12–21	(silver) Runner-up	
2013	Malaysia Open	(Japan) Misaki Matsutomo	(China) Bao Yixin (China) Tian Qing	16–21, 14–21	(silver) Runner-up	
2013	Singapore Open	(Japan) Misaki Matsutomo	(China) Tian Qing (China) Zhao Yunlei	19–21, 16–21	(silver) Runner-up	
2014	Malaysia Open	(Japan) Misaki Matsutomo	(China) Bao Yixin (China) Tang Jinhua	19–21, 21–14, 13–21	(silver) Runner-up	
2014	Japan Open	(Japan) Misaki Matsutomo	(Japan) Reika Kakiiwa (Japan) Miyuki Maeda	21–13, 21–17	(gold) Winner	
2014	Australian Open	(Japan) Misaki Matsutomo	(China) Tian Qing (China) Zhao Yunlei	15–21, 9–21	(silver) Runner-up	
2014	Denmark Open	(Japan) Misaki Matsutomo	(China) Wang Xiaoli (China) Yu Yang	14–21, 14–21	(silver) Runner-up	
2014	Hong Kong Open	(Japan) Misaki Matsutomo	(China) Tian Qing (China) Zhao Yunlei	13–21, 13–21	(silver) Runner-up	
2014	Dubai World Superseries Finals	(Japan) Misaki Matsutomo	(China) Tian Qing (China) Zhao Yunlei	21–17, 21–14	(gold) Winner	
2015	India Open	(Japan) Misaki Matsutomo	(China) Luo Ying (China) Luo Yu	21–19, 21–19	(gold) Winner	
2015	Singapore Open	(Japan) Misaki Matsutomo	(China) Ou Dongni (China) Yu Xiaohan	17–21, 16–21	(silver) Runner-up	
2015	China Open	(Japan) Misaki Matsutomo	(China) Tang Yuanting (China) Yu Yang	21–18, 13–21, 12–21	(silver) Runner-up	
2016	All England Open	(Japan) Misaki Matsutomo	(China) Tang Yuanting (China) Yu Yang	21–10, 21–12	(gold) Winner	
2016	India Open	(Japan) Misaki Matsutomo	(Japan) Naoko Fukuman (Japan) Kurumi Yonao	21–18, 21–18	(gold) Winner	
2016	Singapore Open	(Japan) Misaki Matsutomo	(Indonesia) Nitya Krishinda Maheswari (Indonesia) Greysia Polii	Walkover	(silver) Runner-up	
2016	Indonesia Open	(Japan) Misaki Matsutomo	(China) Tang Yuanting (China) Yu Yang	21–15, 8–21, 21–15	(gold) Winner	
2016	Japan Open	(Japan) Misaki Matsutomo	(Denmark) Christinna Pedersen (Denmark) Kamilla Rytter Juhl	21–19, 18–21, 12–21	(silver) Runner-up	
2016	Denmark Open	(Japan) Misaki Matsutomo	(South Korea) Jung Kyung-eun (South Korea) Shin Seung-chan	19–21, 21–11, 21–16	(gold) Winner	
2016	Dubai World Superseries Finals	(Japan) Misaki Matsutomo	(China) Chen Qingchen (China) Jia Yifan	15–21, 21–13, 17–21	(silver) Runner-up	
2017	Singapore Open	(Japan) Misaki Matsutomo	(Denmark) Christinna Pedersen (Denmark) Kamilla Rytter Juhl	18–21, 21–14, 15–21	(silver) Runner-up	
2017	Australian Open	(Japan) Misaki Matsutomo	(Denmark) Christinna Pedersen (Denmark) Kamilla Rytter Juhl	21–10, 21–13	(gold) Winner	
2017	Japan Open	(Japan) Misaki Matsutomo	(South Korea) Kim Ha-na (South Korea) Kong Hee-yong	21–18, 21–16	(gold) Winner	

BWF Super Series Finals tournament
BWF Super Series Premier tournament
BWF Super Series tournament

=== BWF Grand Prix (7 titles, 1 runner-up) ===
The BWF Grand Prix had two levels, the Grand Prix and Grand Prix Gold. It was a series of badminton tournaments sanctioned by the Badminton World Federation (BWF) and played between 2007 and 2017.

Women's doubles
Year	Tournament	Partner	Opponent	Score	Result	Ref.
2009	India Grand Prix	(Japan) Misaki Matsutomo	(Indonesia) Nadya Melati (Indonesia) Devi Tika Permatasari	21–14, 15–21, 21–15	(gold) Winner	
2011	Russian Open	(Japan) Misaki Matsutomo	(Russia) Valeri Sorokina (Russia) Nina Vislova	20–22, 18–21	(silver) Runner-up	
2012	U.S. Open	(Japan) Misaki Matsutomo	(Russia) Valeri Sorokina (Russia) Nina Vislova	21–19, 21–17	(gold) Winner	
2012	Canada Open	(Japan) Misaki Matsutomo	(Japan) Yuriko Miki (Japan) Koharu Yonemoto	21–15, 15–21, 21–12	(gold) Winner	
2012	Indonesia Grand Prix Gold	(Japan) Misaki Matsutomo	(South Korea) Eom Hye-won (South Korea) Jang Ye-na	21–12, 12–21, 21–13	(gold) Winner	
2014	German Open	(Japan) Misaki Matsutomo	(South Korea) Jung Kyung-eun (South Korea) Kim Ha-na	23–21, 24–22	(gold) Winner	
2016	Malaysia Masters	(Japan) Misaki Matsutomo	(China) Tang Yuanting (China) Yu Yang	21–18, 22–20	(gold) Winner	

Mixed doubles
Year	Tournament	Partner	Opponent	Score	Result	Ref.
2012	Canada Open	(Japan) Ryota Taohata	(Japan) Takeshi Kamura (Japan) Koharu Yonemoto	21–14, 21–16	(gold) Winner	

BWF Grand Prix Gold tournament
BWF Grand Prix tournament

=== BWF International Challenge/Series (5 titles, 2 runners-up) ===
Women's singles
Year	Tournament	Opponent	Score	Result	Ref.
2008	Waikato International	(Japan) Sayaka Sato	21–11, 17–21, 28–26	(gold) Winner	

Women's doubles
Year	Tournament	Partner	Opponent	Score	Result	Ref.
2008	Smiling Fish International	(Japan) Koharu Yonemoto	(Japan) Megumi Taruno (Japan) Oku Yukina	15–21, 20–22	(silver) Runner-up	
2008	Waikato International	(Japan) Koharu Yonemoto	(New Zealand) Renee Flavell (New Zealand) Rachel Hindley	21–18, 21–19	(gold) Winner	
2008	North Shore City International	(Japan) Koharu Yonemoto	(New Zealand) Renee Flavell (New Zealand) Rachel Hindley	21–9, 21–15	(gold) Winner	
2009	Osaka International	(Japan) Misaki Matsutomo	(Japan) Kaori Mori (Japan) Aya Wakisaka	21–16, 16–21, 24–22	(gold) Winner	
2009	Belgian International	(Japan) Misaki Matsutomo	(Scotland) Emma Mason (England) Samantha Ward	21–8, 18–21, 21–13	(gold) Winner	
2010	Osaka International	(Japan) Misaki Matsutomo	(Japan) Mizuki Fujii (Japan) Reika Kakiiwa	19–21, 16–21	(silver) Runner-up	

BWF International Challenge tournament
BWF International Series tournament

== Performance timeline ==
Key

W	Won	F	Finalist	SF	Semi-finalist
QF	Quarter-finalist	#R	Rounds 4, 3, 2, 1	RR	Round-robin stage
Q#	Qualification round	A	Absent	w/d	Withdrew
G	Gold	S	Silver	B	Bronze
NH	Not held	N/A	Not applicable	DNQ	Did not qualify

=== National team ===
- Senior level

Team events	2012	2013	2014	2015	2016	2017	2018	2019	2020
Asia Team Championships	NH				S	NH	G	NH	A
Asia Mixed Team Championships	NH					G	NH	A	NH
Asian Games	NH		B	NH			G	NH	
Uber Cup	B	NH	S	NH	B	NH	G	NH	A
Sudirman Cup	NH	QF	NH	S	NH	B	NH	S	NH

=== Individual competitions ===
- Senior level

===== Women's doubles =====
Event	2011	2012	2013	2014	2015	2016	2017	2018	2019	Ref.
Asian Championships	1R	A	1R	A	B	G	G	S	1R	
Asian Games	NH			S	NH			S	NH	
World Championships	3R	NH	2R	3R	3R	NH	B	3R	QF	
Olympic Games	NH	DNQ	NH			G	NH			

Tournament	BWF Superseries / Grand Prix										BWF World Tour			Best	Ref.
Tournament	2008	2009	2010	2011	2012	2013	2014	2015	2016	2017	2018	2019	2020	Best	Ref.
Malaysia Open	A		1R	2R	A	F	F	1R	QF	SF	W	2R	NH	W ('18)	
India Open	A	2R	A	2R	QF	SF	QF	W	W	A			NH	W ('15, '16)	
Indonesia Masters	NH		A		W	A				NH	W	W	SF	W ('12, '18, '19)	
German Open	A			2R	QF	SF	W	2R	SF	A	w/d	F	NH	W ('14)	
All England Open	A		1R	2R	2R	1R	SF	1R	W	2R	QF	1R	SF	W ('16)	
Swiss Open	A		1R	2R	2R	A							NH	2R ('11, '12)	
Chinese Taipei Open	A	1R	A					SF	A				NH	SF ('15)	
Thailand Open	A	QF	NH	A			NH	A			F	QF	A	F ('18)	
Malaysia Masters	NH	A	2R	1R	A				W	A	QF	SF	QF	W ('16)	
Singapore Open	A		1R	2R	2R	F	SF	F	F	F	A	2R	NH	F ('13, '15, '16, '17)	
Indonesia Open	A		1R	1R	A	QF	2R	2R	W	1R	SF	F	NH	W ('16)	
U.S. Open	A			1R	W	A							NH	W ('12)	
Canada Open	NH		A		W	A							NH	W ('12)	
Japan Open	2R	2R	2R	1R	2R	SF	W	2R	F	W	2R	SF	NH	W ('14, '17)	
China Open	A		QF	QF	QF	QF	SF	F	2R	QF	W	F	NH	W ('18)	
Hong Kong Open	A			2R	QF	SF	F	QF	QF	1R	QF	QF	NH	F ('14)	
China Masters	A	1R	A	1R	A	QF	A				SF	2R	NH	SF ('18)	
Korea Open	A		QF	2R	A	QF	QF	w/d	A	SF	W	QF	NH	W ('18)	
Denmark Open	A		2R	QF	F	SF	F	2R	W	2R	2R	1R	A	W ('16)	
French Open	A			1R	QF	QF	QF	2R	SF	QF	QF	2R	NH	SF ('16)	
Korea Masters	NH		A									F	NH	F ('19)	
Australian Open	NH	A	QF	QF	QF	A	F	SF	QF	W	A	SF	NH	W ('17)	
Syed Modi International	NH	W	A			NH	A				1R	A	NH	W ('09)	
Superseries / World Tour Finals	DNQ				RR	RR	W	SF	F	DNQ	W	DNQ		W ('14, '18)	
Dutch Open	A		1R	A									NH	1R ('10)	
New Zealand Open	A		NH			A						F	NH	F ('19)	
Russian Open	A			F	A								NH	F ('11)	
Year-end ranking	—	41	21	17	7	4	2	4	1	2	2	4	7	1	
Tournament	2008	2009	2010	2011	2012	2013	2014	2015	2016	2017	2018	2019	2020	Best	Ref.

===== Mixed doubles =====
Tournament	BWF Superseries / Grand Prix					Best
Tournament	2009	2010	2011	2012	2013	Best
Malaysia Open	A	1R	A			1R ('10)
India Open	A		1R	A		1R ('11)
Malaysia Masters	A	1R	Q2	A		1R ('10)
German Open	A		2R	A		2R ('11)
Swiss Open	A	1R	1R	1R	A	1R ('10, '11, '12)
Singapore Open	A	Q2	Q1	A		Q2 ('10)
Indonesia Open	A		1R	A		1R ('11)
Australian Open	A	SF	2R	1R	A	SF ('10)
U.S. Open	A		1R	QF	A	QF ('12)
Canada Open	NH	A		W	A	W ('12)
Japan Open	1R	A	Q2	1R	QF	QF ('13)
China Open	A	2R	Q1	A		2R ('10)
Hong Kong Open	A		1R	A		1R ('11)
China Masters	A		2R	A	1R	2R ('11)
Korea Open	A	1R	A			1R ('10)
Denmark Open	A		Q1	A		Q1 ('11)
French Open	A		Q1	A		Q1 ('11)
Macau Open	A	Q1	A			Q1 ('10)
Year-end ranking	138	70	52	119	216	52
Tournament	2009	2010	2011	2012	2013	Best

===== Women's singles =====
Tournament	BWF Superseries / Grand Prix	Best
Tournament	2009	Best
India Open	1R	1R ('09)
Thailand Open	1R	1R ('09)
Syed Modi International	1R	1R ('09)
China Masters	1R	1R ('09)
Year-end ranking	172	172
Tournament	2009	Best

== Record against selected opponents ==
Record against year-end Finals finalists, World Championships semi-finalists, and Olympic quarter-finalists.

=== Misaki Matsutomo ===
Players	M	W	L	Diff.
(Australia) Leanne Choo & Renuga Veeran	1	1	0	+1
(China) Chen Qingchen & Jia Yifan	11	5	6	–1
(China) Du Jing & Yu Yang	1	0	1	–1
(China) Du Yue & Li Yinhui	10	6	4	+2
(China) Luo Ying & Luo Yu	9	7	2	+5
(China) Ma Jin & Tang Jinhua	4	0	4	–4
(China) Ma Jin & Wang Xiaoli	1	0	1	–1
(China) Tang Yuanting & Yu Yang	5	3	2	+1
(China) Tian Qing & Zhao Yunlei	15	6	9	–3
(China) Wang Xiaoli & Yu Yang	5	1	4	–3
(Chinese Taipei) Cheng Wen-hsing & Chien Yu-chin	3	0	3	–3
(Denmark) Christinna Pedersen & Kamilla Rytter Juhl	17	11	6	+5
(India) Jwala Gutta & Ashwini Ponnappa	3	3	0	+3
(Indonesia) Nitya Krishinda Maheswari & Greysia Polii	6	3	3	0
(Indonesia) Greysia Polii & Apriyani Rahayu	12	10	2	+8
(Japan) Mizuki Fujii & Reika Kakiiwa	6	2	4	–2

Players	M	W	L	Diff.
(Japan) Naoko Fukuman & Kurumi Yonao	11	10	1	+9
(Japan) Yuki Fukushima & Sayaka Hirota	11	4	7	–3
(Japan) Reika Kakiiwa & Miyuki Maeda	5	5	0	+5
(Japan) Miyuki Maeda & Satoko Suetsuna	3	1	2	–1
(Japan) Mayu Matsumoto & Wakana Nagahara	8	4	4	0
(Japan) Shiho Tanaka & Koharu Yonemoto	8	5	3	+2
(Malaysia) Vivian Hoo Kah Mun & Woon Khe Wei	11	11	0	+11
(Malaysia) Chin Eei Hui & Wong Pei Tty	1	0	1	–1
(Netherlands) Eefje Muskens & Selena Piek	6	6	0	+6
(Russia) Valeria Sorokina & Nina Vislova	2	1	1	0
(South Korea) Chang Ye-na & Lee So-hee	4	4	0	+4
(South Korea) Eom Hye-won & Chang Ye-na	2	2	0	+2
(South Korea) Ha Jung-eun & Kim Min-jung	4	0	4	–4
(South Korea) Jung Kyung-eun & Shin Seung-chan	7	5	2	+3
(South Korea) Lee So-hee & Shin Seung-chan	13	7	6	+1
