= Kamilla Rytter Juhl =

Danish badminton player (born 1983)

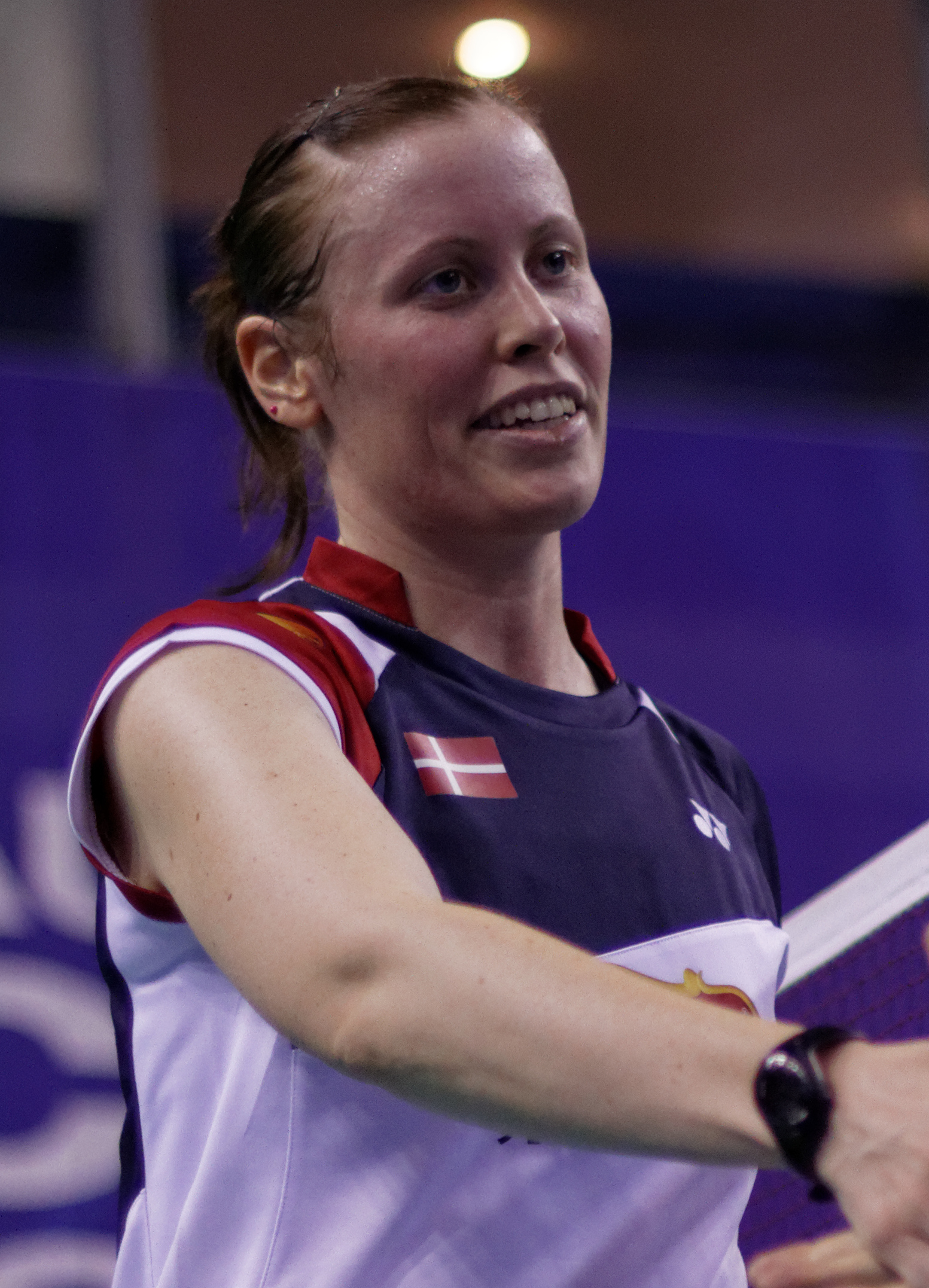
- Rytter Juhl at the 2013 French Super Series

Personal information
- Born: 23 November 1983 (age 42) Skagen, Denmark
- Height: 1.83 m (6 ft 0 in)
- Weight: 71 kg (157 lb)
- Spouse: Christinna Pedersen

Sport
- Country: Denmark
- Sport: Badminton
- Handedness: Left
- Retired: 11 March 2019

Women's & mixed doubles
- Highest ranking: 2 (WD with Christinna Pedersen 10 May 2018); 1 (XD 6 January 2011)
- BWF profile
Medal record
Women's badminton
Representing Denmark
Olympic Games
Silver medal – second place	2016 Rio de Janeiro	Women's doubles
World Championships
Gold medal – first place	2009 Hyderabad	Mixed doubles
Silver medal – second place	2015 Jakarta	Women's doubles
Bronze medal – third place	2013 Guangzhou	Women's doubles
Bronze medal – third place	2017 Glasgow	Women's doubles
Sudirman Cup
Silver medal – second place	2011 Qingdao	Mixed team
Bronze medal – third place	2005 Beijing	Mixed team
Bronze medal – third place	2013 Kuala Lumpur	Mixed team
European Championships
Gold medal – first place	2006 Den Bosch	Mixed doubles
Gold medal – first place	2008 Herning	Women's doubles
Gold medal – first place	2010 Manchester	Mixed doubles
Gold medal – first place	2012 Karlskrona	Women's doubles
Gold medal – first place	2014 Kazan	Women's doubles
Gold medal – first place	2016 La Roche-sur-Yon	Women's doubles
Gold medal – first place	2017 Kolding	Women's doubles
Silver medal – second place	2014 Kazan	Mixed doubles
Bronze medal – third place	2006 Den Bosch	Women's doubles
Bronze medal – third place	2012 Karlskrona	Mixed doubles
European Mixed Team Championships
Gold medal – first place	2015 Leuven	Mixed team
Gold medal – first place	2017 Lubin	Mixed team
Silver medal – second place	2013 Moscow	Mixed team
European Women's Team Championships
Gold medal – first place	2008 Almere	Women's team
Gold medal – first place	2010 Warsaw	Women's team
Gold medal – first place	2014 Basel	Women's team
Gold medal – first place	2016 Kazan	Women's team
Gold medal – first place	2018 Kazan	Women's team
Silver medal – second place	2012 Amsterdam	Women's team
European Junior Championships
Silver medal – second place	2001 Spała	Mixed team
Silver medal – second place	2001 Spała	Mixed doubles

Kamilla Rytter Juhl (born 23 November 1983) is a Danish retired badminton player. Juhl is an Olympic silver medalist, World Championship gold medalist and seven times European champion as well.

== Career ==
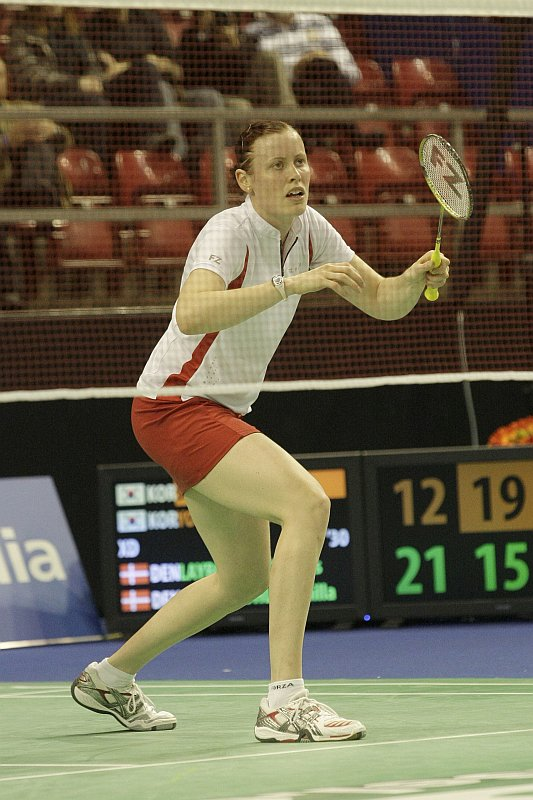
Rytter Juhl at the 2010 Swiss Open Super Series

Rytter Juhl played as a left-handed doubles specialist.

Juhl enjoyed a successful mixed doubles career with Thomas Laybourn, winning the 2009 BWF World Championships and two European titles in 2006 and 2010. The pair also won the BWF World Superseries Finals in 2008, and won a total of two Superseries titles.

After Laybourn's retirement, Rytter Juhl played mixed doubles with Mads Pieler Kolding, and the pair came runner-up in the 2014 European Championships, losing out to their Danish teammates Christinna Pedersen and Joachim Fischer Nielsen in the final.

In the women's doubles, Juhl initially partnered with Lena Frier Kristiansen, and the pair reached 8th on the world rankings, won a bronze and a gold medal at the European Championships, and reached the World Superseries Finals in 2009.

From 2010 to 2018, Rytter Juhl was paired with Christinna Pedersen. While both athletes also focussed on competing with their respective partners in mixed doubles, in 2016 Juhl changed to competing exclusively in women's doubles. The pair won a silver medal at the 2015 World Championships, and a bronze medal at the 2013 Guangzhou World Championship and at the 2017 BWF World Championships. Rytter Juhl and Pedersen won a total of four European women's doubles titles, one World Superseries Final and five Superseries titles, and had a career highest world ranking of 2nd. Having won seven European titles in total, Rytter Juhl is the most successful Danish player in European Championship history. The pair also won a silver medal at the 2016 Rio Olympics and, in doing so, became the first Europeans to ever compete in an Olympic women's doubles final.

Rytter Juhl represented Skovshoved in the Danish Badminton League and lives in Copenhagen, where she trained with the national team. Off the badminton court, Rytter Juhl has a degree in Sport Management.

She announced her retirement in July 2018, due to her being pregnant, and officially announced her retirement from the BWF World Tour in March 2019 together with Pedersen. The duo journey in badminton will continue in the national tournament.

== Personal life ==
Juhl and Christinna Pedersen have been together since 2009. Juhl gave birth to daughter Molly in January 2019.

Juhl and Pedersen's autobiography, "Det Unikke Makkerskab" (loosely translated: The unique partnership), written with support from journalist Rasmus M. Bech, was released in Denmark in October 2017.

== Achievements ==
=== Olympic Games ===
Women's doubles
Year	Venue	Partner	Opponent	Score	Result
2016	Riocentro - Pavilion 4, Rio de Janeiro, Brazil	(Denmark) Christinna Pedersen	(Japan) Misaki Matsutomo (Japan) Ayaka Takahashi	21–18, 9–21, 19–21	Silver

=== BWF World Championships ===
Women's doubles
Year	Venue	Partner	Opponent	Score	Result
2013	Tianhe Sports Center, Guangzhou, China	(Denmark) Christinna Pedersen	(China) Wang Xiaoli (China) Yu Yang	14–21, 21–14, 15–21	Bronze
2015	Istora Senayan, Jakarta, Indonesia	(Denmark) Christinna Pedersen	(China) Tian Qing (China) Zhao Yunlei	25–23, 8–21, 15–21	Silver
2017	Emirates Arena, Glasgow, Scotland	(Denmark) Christinna Pedersen	(Japan) Yuki Fukushima (Japan) Sayaka Hirota	17–21, 21–19, 14–21	Bronze

Mixed doubles
Year	Venue	Partner	Opponent	Score	Result
2009	Gachibowli Indoor Stadium, Hyderabad, India	(Denmark) Thomas Laybourn	(Indonesia) Nova Widianto (Indonesia) Liliyana Natsir	21–13, 21–17	Gold

=== European Championships ===
Women's doubles
Year	Venue	Partner	Opponent	Score	Result
2006	Maaspoort Sports and Events, Den Bosch, Netherlands	(Denmark) Lena Frier Kristiansen	(Germany) Juliane Schenk (Germany) Nicole Grether	21–9, 14–21, 15–21	Bronze
2008	Messecenter, Herning, Denmark	(Denmark) Lena Frier Kristiansen	(England) Donna Kellogg (England) Gail Emms	21–18, 21–18	Gold
2012	Telenor Arena, Karlskrona, Sweden	(Denmark) Christinna Pedersen	(Denmark) Line Damkjær Kruse (Denmark) Marie Røpke	22–20, 13–21, 21–12	Gold
2014	Gymnastics Center, Kazan, Russia	(Denmark) Christinna Pedersen	(Denmark) Line Damkjær Kruse (Denmark) Marie Røpke	21–11, 21–11	Gold
2016	Vendéspace, La Roche-sur-Yon, France	(Denmark) Christinna Pedersen	(Netherlands) Eefje Muskens (Netherlands) Selena Piek	21–18, 21–17	Gold
2017	Sydbank Arena, Kolding, Denmark	(Denmark) Christinna Pedersen	(Bulgaria) Gabriela Stoeva (Bulgaria) Stefani Stoeva	21–11, 15–21, 21–11	Gold

Mixed doubles
Year	Venue	Partner	Opponent	Score	Result
2006	Maaspoort Sports and Events, Den Bosch, Netherlands	(Denmark) Thomas Laybourn	(Denmark) Jens Eriksen (Denmark) Mette Schjoldager	22–20, 21–14	Gold
2010	Manchester Evening News Arena, Manchester, England	(Denmark) Thomas Laybourn	(Poland) Robert Mateusiak (Poland) Nadieżda Kostiuczyk	21–19, 18–21, 21–12	Gold
2012	Telenor Arena, Karlskrona, Sweden	(Denmark) Thomas Laybourn	(Denmark) Mads Pieler Kolding (Denmark) Julie Houmann	21–16, 19–21, 18–21	Bronze
2014	Gymnastics Center, Kazan, Russia	(Denmark) Mads Pieler Kolding	(Denmark) Joachim Fischer Nielsen (Denmark) Christinna Pedersen	24–22, 13–21, 18–21	Silver

=== European Junior Championships ===
Mixed doubles
Year	Venue	Partner	Opponent	Score	Result
2001	Spała Olympic Center, Spała, Poland	(Denmark) Carsten Mogensen	(Denmark) Rasmus Andersen (Denmark) Mette Nielsen	15–8, 9–15, 15–17	Silver

=== BWF World Tour (2 titles) ===
The BWF World Tour, which was announced on 19 March 2017 and implemented in 2018, is a series of elite badminton tournaments sanctioned by the Badminton World Federation (BWF). The BWF World Tours are divided into levels of World Tour Finals, Super 1000, Super 750, Super 500, Super 300 (part of the HSBC World Tour), and the BWF Tour Super 100.

Women's doubles
Year	Tournament	Level	Partner	Opponent	Score	Result
2018	Malaysia Masters	Super 500	(Denmark) Christinna Pedersen	(China) Chen Qingchen (China) Jia Yifan	22–20, 21–18	(gold) Winner
2018	All England Open	Super 1000	(Denmark) Christinna Pedersen	(Japan) Yuki Fukushima (Japan) Sayaka Hirota	21–19, 21–18	(gold) Winner

=== BWF Superseries ===
The BWF Superseries, which was launched on 14 December 2006 and implemented in 2007, was a series of elite badminton tournaments, sanctioned by the Badminton World Federation (BWF). BWF Superseries levels were Superseries and Superseries Premier. A season of Superseries consisted of twelve tournaments around the world that had been introduced since 2011. Successful players were invited to the Superseries Finals, which were held at the end of each year.

Women's doubles
Year	Tournament	Partner	Opponent	Score	Result
2009	Denmark Open	(Denmark) Lena Frier Kristiansen	(China) Pan Pan (China) Zhang Yawen	20–22, 21–18, 12–21	(silver) Runner-up
2009	World Superseries Finals	(Denmark) Lena Frier Kristiansen	(Malaysia) Chin Eei Hui (Malaysia) Wong Pei Tty	17–21, 14–21	(silver) Runner-up
2012	Malaysia Open	(Denmark) Christinna Pedersen	(South Korea) Ha Jung-eun (South Korea) Kim Min-jung	21–19, 21–18	(gold) Winner
2012	French Open	(Denmark) Christinna Pedersen	(China) Ma Jin (China) Tang Jinhua	12–21, 21–23	(silver) Runner-up
2012	World Superseries Finals	(Denmark) Christinna Pedersen	(China) Wang Xiaoli (China) Yu Yang	16–21, 14–21	(silver) Runner-up
2013	India Open	(Denmark) Christinna Pedersen	(Japan) Miyuki Maeda (Japan) Satoko Suetsuna	21–12, 21–23, 18–21	(silver) Runner-up
2013	Japan Open	(Denmark) Christinna Pedersen	(China) Ma Jin (China) Tang Jinhua	11–21, 14–21	(silver) Runner-up
2013	Denmark Open	(Denmark) Christinna Pedersen	(China) Bao Yixin (China) Tang Jinhua	16–21, 13–21	(silver) Runner-up
2013	World Superseries Finals	(Denmark) Christinna Pedersen	(China) Ma Jin (China) Tang Jinhua	21–19, 21–12	(gold) Winner
2014	Singapore Open	(Denmark) Christinna Pedersen	(China) Bao Yixin (China) Tang Jinhua	21–14, 19–21, 15–21	(silver) Runner-up
2015	Japan Open	(Denmark) Christinna Pedersen	(China) Zhao Yunlei (China) Zhong Qianxin	12–21, 16–21	(silver) Runner-up
2015	Dubai World Superseries Finals	(Denmark) Christinna Pedersen	(China) Luo Ying (China) Luo Yu	21–14, 9–21, 4–14 retired	(silver) Runner-up
2016	Japan Open	(Denmark) Christinna Pedersen	(Japan) Misaki Matsutomo (Japan) Ayaka Takahashi	19–21, 21–18, 21–12	(gold) Winner
2016	Hong Kong Open	(Denmark) Christinna Pedersen	(China) Huang Dongping (China) Li Yinhui	21–19, 21–10	(gold) Winner
2017	All England Open	(Denmark) Christinna Pedersen	(South Korea) Chang Ye-na (South Korea) Lee So-hee	18–21, 13–21	(silver) Runner-up
2017	Singapore Open	(Denmark) Christinna Pedersen	(Japan) Misaki Matsutomo (Japan) Ayaka Takahashi	21–18, 14–21, 21–15	(gold) Winner
2017	Australian Open	(Denmark) Christinna Pedersen	(Japan) Misaki Matsutomo (Japan) Ayaka Takahashi	10–21, 13–21	(silver) Runner-up

Mixed doubles
Year	Tournament	Partner	Opponent	Score	Result
2007	Korea Open	(Denmark) Thomas Laybourn	(China) Zheng Bo (China) Gao Ling	20–22, 19–21	(silver) Runner-up
2008	Indonesia Open	(Denmark) Thomas Laybourn	(China) Zheng Bo (China) Gao Ling	14–21, 8–21	(silver) Runner-up
2008	Denmark Open	(Denmark) Thomas Laybourn	(Denmark) Joachim Fischer Nielsen (Denmark) Christinna Pedersen	14–21, 17–21	(silver) Runner-up
2008	World Superseries Finals	(Denmark) Thomas Laybourn	(Indonesia) Nova Widianto (Indonesia) Liliyana Natsir	21–19, 18–21, 22–20	(gold) Winner
2010	Malaysia Open	(Denmark) Thomas Laybourn	(China) Tao Jiaming (China) Zhang Yawen	21–19, 18–21, 15–21	(silver) Runner-up
2010	Singapore Open	(Denmark) Thomas Laybourn	(Indonesia) Nova Widianto (Indonesia) Liliyana Natsir	21–12, 21–15	(gold) Winner
2010	Denmark Open	(Denmark) Thomas Laybourn	(England) Nathan Robertson (England) Jenny Wallwork	21–12, 12–21, 21–9	(gold) Winner
2012	All England Open	(Denmark) Thomas Laybourn	(Indonesia) Tontowi Ahmad (Indonesia) Liliyana Natsir	17–21, 19–21	(silver) Runner-up

BWF Super Series Finals tournament
BWF Super Series Premier tournament
BWF Super Series tournament

=== BWF Grand Prix ===
The BWF Grand Prix had two levels, the Grand Prix and Grand Prix Gold. It was a series of badminton tournaments sanctioned by the Badminton World Federation (BWF) and played between 2007 and 2017. The World Badminton Grand Prix was sanctioned by the International Badminton Federation from 1983 to 2006.

Women's doubles
Year	Tournament	Partner	Opponent	Score	Result
2004	Dutch Open	(Denmark) Lena Frier Kristiansen	(Denmark) Pernille Harder (Denmark) Helle Nielsen	15–12, 15–8	(gold) Winner
2008	Dutch Open	(Denmark) Lena Frier Kristiansen	(Indonesia) Shendy Puspa Irawati (Indonesia) Meiliana Jauhari	21–16, 25–23	(gold) Winner
2013	London Grand Prix Gold	(Denmark) Christinna Pedersen	(Denmark) Line Damkjær Kruse (Denmark) Marie Røpke	12–21, 21–17, 21–15	(gold) Winner
2015	Malaysia Masters	(Denmark) Christinna Pedersen	(Japan) Naoko Fukuman (Japan) Kurumi Yonao	21–14, 21–14	(gold) Winner
2015	German Open	(Denmark) Christinna Pedersen	(Indonesia) Della Destiara Haris (Indonesia) Rosyita Eka Putri Sari	21–18, 17–21, 21–9	(gold) Winner
2017	Syed Modi International	(Denmark) Christinna Pedersen	(India) Ashwini Ponnappa (India) N. Sikki Reddy	21–16, 21–18	(gold) Winner

Mixed doubles
Year	Tournament	Partner	Opponent	Score	Result
2004	Dutch Open	(Denmark) Thomas Laybourn	(Denmark) Peter Steffensen (Denmark) Lena Frier Kristiansen	15–11, 15–7	(gold) Winner
2005	All England Open	(Denmark) Thomas Laybourn	(England) Nathan Robertson (England) Gail Emms	10–15, 12–15	(silver) Runner-up
2005	Thailand Open	(Denmark) Thomas Laybourn	(South Korea) Lee Jae-jin (South Korea) Lee Hyo-jung	12–15, 12–15	(silver) Runner-up
2005	Denmark Open	(Denmark) Thomas Laybourn	(Denmark) Lars Paaske (Denmark) Helle Nielsen	15–8, 15–9	(gold) Winner
2006	Macau Open	(Denmark) Thomas Laybourn	(China) Zhang Jun (China) Gao Ling	21–19, 22–20	(gold) Winner
2006	Denmark Open	(Denmark) Thomas Laybourn	(England) Anthony Clark (England) Donna Kellogg	21–14, 14–21, 20–22	(silver) Runner-up
2007	Chinese Taipei Open	(Denmark) Thomas Laybourn	(Indonesia) Flandy Limpele (Indonesia) Vita Marissa	18–21, 23–25	(silver) Runner-up
2011	Bitburger Open	(Denmark) Thomas Laybourn	(Malaysia) Chan Peng Soon (Malaysia) Goh Liu Ying	18–21, 21–14, 25–27	(silver) Runner-up
2012	German Open	(Denmark) Thomas Laybourn	(South Korea) Lee Yong-dae (South Korea) Ha Jung-eun	21–9, 21–16	(gold) Winner
2012	Dutch Open	(Denmark) Mads Pieler Kolding	(England) Marcus Ellis (England) Gabrielle White	21–15, 21–13	(gold) Winner
2015	German Open	(Denmark) Mads Pieler Kolding	(Denmark) Joachim Fischer Nielsen (Denmark) Christinna Pedersen	21–18, 21–17	(gold) Winner

BWF Grand Prix Gold tournament
BWF Grand Prix tournament

=== BWF International Challenge/Series ===
Women's doubles
Year	Tournament	Partner	Opponent	Score	Result
2001	Irish International	(Denmark) Lena Frier Kristiansen	(Denmark) Lene Mørk (Denmark) Helle Nielsen	3–7, 3–7, 2–7	(silver) Runner-up
2002	Portugal International	(Denmark) Lena Frier Kristiansen	(Denmark) Lene Mørk (Denmark) Helle Nielsen	2–7, 3–7, 0–7	(silver) Runner-up
2004	Dutch International	(Denmark) Lena Frier Kristiansen	(Bulgaria) Neli Boteva (Bulgaria) Petya Nedelcheva	10–15, 6–15	(silver) Runner-up
2008	Finnish International	(Denmark) Lena Frier Kristiansen	(Russia) Ekaterina Ananina (Russia) Anastasia Russkikh	21–17, 21–15	(gold) Winner

Mixed doubles
Year	Tournament	Partner	Opponent	Score	Result
2002	Portugal International	(Denmark) Carsten Mogensen	(Sweden) Fredrik Bergström (Sweden) Jenny Karlsson	3–7, 7–2, 4–7, 4–7	(silver) Runner-up
2002	Le Volant d'Or de Toulouse	(Denmark) Carsten Mogensen	(Denmark) Jonas Glyager Jensen (Denmark) Majken Vange	5–11, 8–11	(silver) Runner-up
2003	French International	(Denmark) Carsten Mogensen	(Sweden) Jörgen Olsson (Sweden) Frida Andreasson	11–5, 9–11, 7–11	(silver) Runner-up
2003	Croatian International	(Denmark) Carsten Mogensen	(Denmark) Rasmus Mangor Andersen (Denmark) Lena Frier Kristiansen	11–2, 11–3	(gold) Winner
2003	Irish International	(Denmark) Rasmus Mangor Andersen	(England) Simon Archer (England) Donna Kellogg	12–15, 4–15	(silver) Runner-up

BWF International Challenge tournament
BWF International Series tournament

== Record Against Top Opponents ==
Women's doubles results with Christinna Pedersen against Super Series finalists, Worlds Semi-finalists, and Olympic quarterfinalists, as well as all Olympic opponents.

- (Bulgaria) / (Russia) Petya Nedelcheva & Anastasia Russkikh 0–1
- (China) Ma Jin & Tang Jinhua 1–3
- (China) Wang Xiaoli & Yu Yang 1–6
- (China) Tian Qing & Zhao Yunlei 4–10
- (China) Bao Yixin & Zhong Qianxin 2–1
- (China) Bao Yixin & Tang Jinhua 0–3
- (China) Bao Yixin & Ma Jin 0–2
- (China) Ou Dongni & Tang Yuanting 1–1
- (China) Bao Yixin & Tian Qing 0–2
- (China) Luo Ying & Luo Yu 2–3
- (China) Ma Jin & Tang Yuanting 1–3
- (China) Tang Yuanting & Yu Yang 1–1
- (Chinese Taipei) Cheng Wen-hsing & Chien Yu-chin 1–1
- (Hong Kong) Poon Lok Yan & Tse Ying Suet 4–1
- (India) Jwala Gutta & Ashwini Ponnappa 2–0
- (Japan) Mizuki Fujii & Reika Kakiiwa 3–2
- (Japan) Miyuki Maeda & Satoko Suetsuna 3–3
- (Japan) Shizuka Matsuo & Mami Naito 5–2
- (Japan) Misaki Matsutomo & Ayaka Takahashi 6–10
- (Japan) Reika Kakiiwa & Miyuki Maeda 3–0
- (South Korea) Jung Kyung-eun & Kim Ha-na 4–3
- (South Korea) Ha Jung-eun & Kim Min-jung 1–4
- (South Korea) Jung Kyung-eun & Shin Seung-chan 2–1
- (South Korea) Chang Ye-na & Lee So-hee 1–2
- (Malaysia) Chin Eei Hui & Wong Pei Tty 1–1
- (Russia) Valeria Sorokina & Nina Vislova 2–0
- (Thailand) Duanganong Aroonkesorn & Kunchala Voravichitchaikul 4–0
- (United States) Eva Lee & Paula Lynn Obanana 3–0
