= Tang Yuanting =

Chinese badminton player

Tang Yuanting 唐渊渟
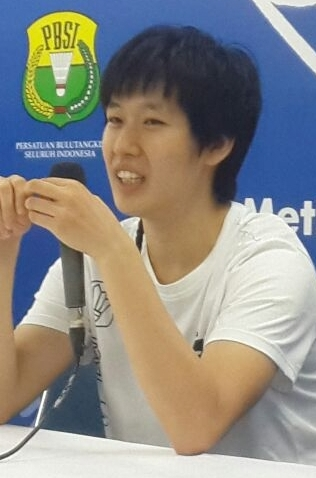
- Tang at the 2016 Indonesia Super Series Premier

Personal information
- Born: 2 August 1994 (age 32) Nanning, Guangxi, China
- Height: 1.76 m (5 ft 9 in)

Sport
- Country: China
- Sport: Badminton
- Retired: 19 September 2016

Women's and mixed doubles
- Highest ranking: 6 (WD with Ma Jin 23 September 2015); 2 (WD with Yu Yang 14 April 2016)
- BWF profile
Medal record
Women's badminton
Representing China
Sudirman Cup
Gold medal – first place	2015 Dongguan	Mixed team
Uber Cup
Gold medal – first place	2016 Kunshan	Women's team
Asian Championships
Gold medal – first place	2015 Wuhan	Women's doubles
Asia Team Championships
Gold medal – first place	2016 Hyderabad	Women's team
East Asian Games
Gold medal – first place	2013 Tianjin	Women's doubles
Gold medal – first place	2013 Tianjin	Women's team

Tang Yuanting (Chinese: 唐渊渟; pinyin: Táng Yuāntíng; born 2 August 1994) is a Chinese badminton player specializing in doubles. She is a women's doubles Asian Champion and East Asian Games gold medalist. Tang was part of the China winning team in a Sudirman Cup, Uber Cup, Asia Team Championships, and an East Asian Games. She competed at the 2016 Rio Olympics in the women's doubles event partnered with Yu Yang, but lost to the Korean pair in the bronze medal match. She retired from the international competition at the age of 22 in September 2016.

Tang Yuanting later moved to Australia to pursue her master of education degree at the University of Sydney, and then participated in the national badminton events.

== Achievements ==
=== Asian Championships ===
Women's doubles
Year	Venue	Partner	Opponent	Score	Result
2015	Wuhan Sports Center Gymnasium, Wuhan, China	(China) Ma Jin	(China) Wang Xiaoli (China) Yu Yang	21–12, 21–12	Gold

=== East Asian Games ===
Women's doubles
Year	Venue	Partner	Opponent	Score	Result
2013	Binhai New Area Dagang Gymnasium, Tianjin, China	(China) Ou Dongni	(Japan) Yuriko Miki (Japan) Koharu Yonemoto	21–8, 21–11	Gold

=== BWF Superseries ===
The BWF Superseries, which was launched on 14 December 2006 and implemented in 2007, is a series of elite badminton tournaments, sanctioned by the Badminton World Federation (BWF). BWF Superseries levels are Superseries and Superseries Premier. A season of Superseries consists of twelve tournaments around the world that have been introduced since 2011. Successful players are invited to the Superseries Finals, which are held at the end of each year.

Women's doubles
Year	Tournament	Partner	Opponent	Score	Result
2013	Hong Kong Open	(China) Ou Dongni	(China) Bao Yixin (China) Tang Jinhua	21–18, 16–21, 15–21	(silver) Runner-up
2014	All England Open	(China) Ma Jin	(China) Wang Xiaoli (China) Yu Yang	17–21, 21–18, 21–23	(silver) Runner-up
2014	India Open	(China) Yu Yang	(South Korea) Jung Kyung-eun (South Korea) Kim Ha-na	21–10, 13–21, 21–16	(gold) Winner
2014	Indonesia Open	(China) Ma Jin	(China) Tian Qing (China) Zhao Yunlei	Walkover	(silver) Runner-up
2014	French Open	(China) Ma Jin	(China) Wang Xiaoli (China) Yu Yang	15–21, 9–21	(silver) Runner-up
2015	All England Open	(China) Bao Yixin	(China) Wang Xiaoli (China) Yu Yang	21–14, 21–14	(gold) Winner
2015	Australian Open	(China) Ma Jin	(China) Tang Jinhua (China) Tian Qing	21–19, 16–21, 22–20	(gold) Winner
2015	China Open	(China) Yu Yang	(Japan) Misaki Matsutomo (Japan) Ayaka Takahashi	18–21, 21–13, 21–12	(gold) Winner
2015	Hong Kong Open	(China) Yu Yang	(China) Tian Qing (China) Zhao Yunlei	15–21, 12–21	(silver) Runner-up
2016	All England Open	(China) Yu Yang	(Japan) Misaki Matsutomo (Japan) Ayaka Takahashi	10–21, 12–21	(silver) Runner-up
2016	Malaysia Open	(China) Yu Yang	(South Korea) Jung Kyung-eun (South Korea) Shin Seung-chan	21–11, 21–17	(gold) Winner
2016	Indonesia Open	(China) Yu Yang	(Japan) Misaki Matsutomo (Japan) Ayaka Takahashi	15–21, 21–8, 15–21	(silver) Runner-up

BWF Super Series Finals tournament
BWF Super Series Premier tournament
BWF Super Series tournament

=== BWF Grand Prix ===
The BWF Grand Prix had two levels, the BWF Grand Prix and Grand Prix Gold. It was a series of badminton tournaments sanctioned by the Badminton World Federation (BWF) which was held from 2007 to 2017.

Women's doubles
Year	Tournament	Partner	Opponent	Score	Result
2013	New Zealand Open	(China) Ou Dongni	(Malaysia) Vivian Hoo (Malaysia) Woon Khe Wei	21–15, 11–21, 21–19	(gold) Winner
2015	Swiss Open	(China) Bao Yixin	(Japan) Ayane Kurihara (Japan) Naru Shinoya	21–6, 17–21, 21–17	(gold) Winner
2015	China Masters	(China) Bao Yixin	(China) Tang Jinhua (China) Zhong Qianxin	14–21, 21–11, 17–21	(silver) Runner-up
2015	Bitburger Open	(China) Yu Yang	(Hong Kong) Poon Lok Yan (Hong Kong) Tse Ying Suet	21–10, 21–18	(gold) Winner
2015	Indonesian Masters	(China) Yu Yang	(Indonesia) Nitya Krishinda Maheswari (Indonesia) Greysia Polii	21–17, 21–11	(gold) Winner
2016	Malaysia Masters	(China) Yu Yang	(Japan) Misaki Matsutomo (Japan) Ayaka Takahashi	18–21, 20–22	(silver) Runner-up
2016	Thailand Masters	(China) Yu Yang	(China) Tian Qing (China) Zhao Yunlei	21–11, 12–21, 21–23	(silver) Runner-up

BWF Grand Prix Gold tournament
BWF Grand Prix tournament
