= 2008 Thomas Cup knockout stage =

2008 Knockout stage of the Thomas Cup badminton team championship

This article lists the complete results of the knockout stage of the 2008 Thomas Cup in Jakarta, Indonesia. All times are West Indonesia Time (UTC+07:00).

== Group results ==
The winners of each group were exempted until the quarter-finals stage while the rest of the teams competed in the round of 16 for a place in the final eight.

Group	Winners	Runners-up	Third place
A	China	Canada	Nigeria
B	Malaysia	England	South Korea
C	Denmark	Japan	New Zealand
D	Indonesia	Thailand	Germany

== Bracket ==
Round of 16
China
Bye
New Zealand	0
Thailand	3
Malaysia
Bye
Japan	3
Germany	2
Canada	0
South Korea	3
Bye
Denmark
England	3
Nigeria	0
Bye
Indonesia

Quarter-finals
China	3
Thailand	0
Malaysia	3
Japan	0
South Korea	3
Denmark	2
England	0
Indonesia	3

Semi-finals
China	3
Malaysia	2
South Korea	3
Indonesia	0

Final
China	3
South Korea	1

== Round of 16 ==
=== New Zealand vs Thailand ===
New Zealand
0
Istora Gelora Bung Karno, Court 1
13 May 2008, 13:00 UTC+7

Thailand
3

			1	2	3
1	(New Zealand) (Thailand)	John Moody; Boonsak Ponsana	11; 21	11; 21
2	(New Zealand) (Thailand)	Kevin Dennerly-Minturn; Poompat Sapkulchananart	6; 21	3; 21
3	(New Zealand) (Thailand)	Craig Cooper; Tanongsak Saensomboonsuk	19; 21	9; 21
4	(New Zealand) (Thailand)	Nathan Hannam / Henry Tam; Nuttaphon Narkthong / Tesana Panvisvas				not played
5	(New Zealand) (Thailand)	Craig Cooper / John Moody; Songphon Anugritayawon / Sudket Prapakamol				not played

=== Japan vs Germany ===
Japan
3
Istora Gelora Bung Karno, Court 4
13 May 2008, 13:00 UTC+7

Germany
2

			1	2	3
1	(Japan) (Germany)	Shōji Satō; Marc Zwiebler	19; 21	21; 17	21; 5
2	(Japan) (Germany)	Shintaro Ikeda / Shuichi Sakamoto; Kristof Hopp / Ingo Kindervater	19; 21	21; 17	16; 21
3	(Japan) (Germany)	Sho Sasaki; Dieter Domke	12; 21	16; 21
4	(Japan) (Germany)	Keita Masuda / Tadashi Ōtsuka; Michael Fuchs / Roman Spitko	22; 20	21; 18
5	(Japan) (Germany)	Kenichi Tago; Marcel Reuter	21; 19	21; 15

=== Canada vs South Korea ===
Canada
0
Istora Gelora Bung Karno, Court 2
13 May 2008, 18:00 UTC+7

South Korea
3

			1	2	3
1	(Canada) (South Korea)	Andrew Dabeka; Park Sung-hwan	11; 21	11; 21
2	(Canada) (South Korea)	Mike Beres / William Milroy; Jung Jae-sung / Lee Yong-dae	18; 21	12; 21
3	(Canada) (South Korea)	Bobby Milroy; Lee Hyun-il	15; 21	8; 21
4	(Canada) (South Korea)	Alvin Lau / Toby Ng; Hwang Ji-man / Lee Jae-jin				not played
5	(Canada) (South Korea)	Stephan Wojcikiewicz; Hong Ji-hoon				not played

=== England vs Nigeria ===
England
3
Istora Gelora Bung Karno, Court 1
13 May 2008, 18:00 UTC+7

Nigeria
0

			1	2	3
1	(England) (Nigeria)	Rajiv Ouseph; Ibrahim Adamu	21; 9	21; 8
2	(England) (Nigeria)	Nathan Rice; Jinkan Ifraimu	21; 17	21; 16
3	(England) (Nigeria)	Ben Beckman; Ola Fagbemi	19; 21	21; 15	21; 16
4	(England) (Nigeria)	Chris Langridge / Robin Middleton; Paul Fagbemi / Akeem Ogunseye				not played
5	(England) (Nigeria)	Dean George / Chris Adcock; Ola Fagbemi / Jinkan Ifraimu				not played

== Quarter-finals ==
=== China vs Thailand ===
China
3
Istora Gelora Bung Karno, Court 4
14 May 2008, 13:00 UTC+7

Thailand
0

			1	2	3
1	(China) (Thailand)	Lin Dan; Boonsak Ponsana	21; 15	21; 14
2	(China) (Thailand)	Cai Yun / Fu Haifeng; Nuttaphon Narkthong / Tesana Panvisvas	21; 12	21; 17
3	(China) (Thailand)	Bao Chunlai; Poompat Sapkulchananart	21; 14	21; 11
4	(China) (Thailand)	Guo Zhendong / Xie Zhongbo; Songphon Anugritayawon / Sudket Prapakamol				not played
5	(China) (Thailand)	Chen Jin; Tanongsak Saensomboonsuk				not played

=== Malaysia vs Japan ===
Malaysia
3
Istora Gelora Bung Karno, Court 3
14 May 2008, 13:00 UTC+7

Japan
0

			1	2	3
1	(Malaysia) (Japan)	Lee Chong Wei; Shōji Satō	21; 10	21; 16
2	(Malaysia) (Japan)	Choong Tan Fook / Koo Kien Keat; Shintaro Ikeda / Shuichi Sakamoto	21; 13	21; 11
3	(Malaysia) (Japan)	Wong Choong Hann; Kenichi Tago	21; 13	21; 18
4	(Malaysia) (Japan)	Tan Boon Heong / Mohd Zakry Abdul Latif; Keita Masuda / Tadashi Ōtsuka				not played
5	(Malaysia) (Japan)	Muhammad Hafiz Hashim; Hiroyuki Endo				not played

=== Denmark vs South Korea ===
Denmark
2
Istora Gelora Bung Karno, Court 3
14 May 2008, 18:00 UTC+7

South Korea
3

			1	2	3
1	(Denmark) (South Korea)	Peter Gade; Park Sung-hwan	24; 26	22; 20	21; 19
2	(Denmark) (South Korea)	Lars Paaske / Jonas Rasmussen; Jung Jae-sung / Lee Yong-dae	21; 18	10; 21	21; 19
3	(Denmark) (South Korea)	Joachim Persson; Lee Hyun-il	10; 21	14; 21
4	(Denmark) (South Korea)	Mathias Boe / Carsten Mogensen; Hwang Ji-man / Lee Jae-jin	19; 21	18; 21
5	(Denmark) (South Korea)	Jan Ø. Jørgensen; Shon Seung-mo	11; 21	9; 21

=== Indonesia vs England ===
Indonesia
3
Istora Gelora Bung Karno, Court 2
14 May 2008, 18:00 UTC+7

England
0

			1	2	3
1	(Indonesia) (England)	Sony Dwi Kuncoro; Andrew Smith	23; 25	21; 19	21; 5
2	(Indonesia) (England)	Markis Kido / Hendra Setiawan; Robert Adcock / Robin Middleton	21; 12	21; 10
3	(Indonesia) (England)	Taufik Hidayat; Rajiv Ouseph	21; 17	21; 16
4	(Indonesia) (England)	Hendra Aprida Gunawan / Joko Riyadi; Chris Langridge / Dean George				not played
5	(Indonesia) (England)	Simon Santoso; Ben Beckman				not played

== Semi-finals ==
=== China vs Malaysia ===
China
3
Istora Gelora Bung Karno, Court 1
16 May 2008, 13:00 UTC+7

Malaysia
2

			1	2	3
1	(China) (Malaysia)	Lin Dan; Lee Chong Wei	12; 21	14; 21
2	(China) (Malaysia)	Cai Yun / Fu Haifeng; Koo Kien Keat / Tan Boon Heong	21; 16	21; 17
3	(China) (Malaysia)	Bao Chunlai; Wong Choong Hann	21; 18	21; 7
4	(China) (Malaysia)	Guo Zhendong / Xie Zhongbo; Mohd Zakry Abdul Latif / Mohd Fairuzizuan Mohd Tazari	17; 21	16; 21
5	(China) (Malaysia)	Chen Jin; Muhammad Hafiz Hashim	21; 12	21; 16

=== South Korea vs Indonesia ===
South Korea
3
Istora Gelora Bung Karno, Court 1
16 May 2008, 18:00 UTC+7

Indonesia
0

			1	2	3
1	(South Korea) (Indonesia)	Park Sung-hwan; Sony Dwi Kuncoro	21; 12	12; 21	21; 18
2	(South Korea) (Indonesia)	Jung Jae-sung / Lee Yong-dae; Markis Kido / Hendra Setiawan	21; 19	18; 21	21; 10
3	(South Korea) (Indonesia)	Lee Hyun-il; Taufik Hidayat	21; 13	21; 14
4	(South Korea) (Indonesia)	Hwang Ji-man / Lee Jae-jin; Nova Widianto / Candra Wijaya				not played
5	(South Korea) (Indonesia)	Shon Seung-mo; Simon Santoso				not played

== Final ==
=== China vs South Korea ===
China
3
Istora Gelora Bung Karno, Court 1
18 May 2008, 18:00 UTC+7

South Korea
1

			1	2	3
1	(China) (South Korea)	Lin Dan; Park Sung-hwan	10; 21	21; 18	21; 8
2	(China) (South Korea)	Cai Yun / Fu Haifeng; Jung Jae-sung / Lee Yong-dae	23; 25	16; 21
3	(China) (South Korea)	Bao Chunlai; Lee Hyun-il	28; 26	21; 11
4	(China) (South Korea)	Guo Zhendong / Xie Zhongbo; Hwang Ji-man / Lee Jae-jin	21; 12	19; 21	21; 12
5	(China) (South Korea)	Chen Yu; Shon Seung-mo				not played
