= 2008 Thomas Cup group stage =

Badminton team tournament in Jakarta

This article lists the complete results of the group stage of the 2008 Thomas Cup in Jakarta, Indonesia.

== Draw ==
=== Group composition ===
Group
Group A	Group B	Group C	Group D
China; Canada; Nigeria	Malaysia; England; South Korea	Denmark; Japan; New Zealand	Indonesia (Host); Thailand; Germany

== Group A ==
Pos	Team	Pld	W	L	MF	MA	MD	GF	GA	GD	PF	PA	PD	Pts	Qualification
1	China	2	2	0	10	0	+10	20	0	+20	420	180	+240	2	Quarter-finals
2	Canada	2	1	1	5	5	0	10	10	0	322	347	−25	1	Round of 16
3	Nigeria	2	0	2	0	10	−10	0	20	−20	205	420	−215	0	Round of 16

Source: BadmintonCN

=== China vs Nigeria ===
China
5
Istora Gelora Bung Karno, Court 2
11 May 2008, 08:00 UTC+7

Nigeria
0

			1	2	3
1	(China) (Nigeria)	Lin Dan; Greg Okuonghae	21; 6	21; 11
2	(China) (Nigeria)	Bao Chunlai; Akeem Ogunseye	21; 9	21; 3
3	(China) (Nigeria)	Chen Yu; Jinkan Ifraimu	21; 7	21; 6
4	(China) (Nigeria)	Cai Yun / Fu Haifeng; Greg Okuonghae / Akeem Ogunseye	21; 4	21; 3
5	(China) (Nigeria)	He Hanbin / Shen Ye; Ola Fagbemi / Jinkan Ifraimu	21; 8	21; 11

=== Canada vs Nigeria ===
Canada
5
Istora Gelora Bung Karno, Court 1
11 May 2008, 18:00 UTC+7

Nigeria
0

			1	2	3
1	(Canada) (Nigeria)	Bobby Milroy; Greg Okuonghae	21; 19	21; 17
2	(Canada) (Nigeria)	Stephan Wojcikiewicz; Jinkan Ifraimu	21; 8	21; 17
3	(Canada) (Nigeria)	David Snider; Ola Fagbemi	21; 15	21; 19
4	(Canada) (Nigeria)	Mike Beres / William Milroy; Ola Fagbemi / Jinkan Ifraimu	21; 16	21; 7
5	(Canada) (Nigeria)	Toby Ng / Alvin Lau; Akeem Ogunseye / Greg Okuonghae	21; 10	21; 11

=== China vs Canada ===
China
5
Istora Gelora Bung Karno, Court 1
12 May 2008, 13:00 UTC+7

Canada
0

			1	2	3
1	(China) (Canada)	Lin Dan; Andrew Dabeka	21; 11	21; 15
2	(China) (Canada)	Cai Yun / Fu Haifeng; Mike Beres / William Milroy	21; 11	21; 10
3	(China) (Canada)	Bao Chunlai; Bobby Milroy	21; 14	21; 8
4	(China) (Canada)	Xie Zhongbo / Guo Zhendong; Toby Ng / Alvin Lau	21; 8	21; 8
5	(China) (Canada)	Chen Jin; Stephan Wojcikiewicz	21; 17	21; 10

== Group B ==
Pos	Team	Pld	W	L	MF	MA	MD	GF	GA	GD	PF	PA	PD	Pts	Qualification
1	Malaysia	2	2	0	9	1	+8	19	2	+17	429	326	+103	2	Quarter-finals
2	England	2	1	1	4	6	−2	8	13	−5	376	396	−20	1	Round of 16
3	South Korea	2	0	2	2	8	−6	5	17	−12	355	438	−83	0	Round of 16

Source: BadmintonCN

=== Malaysia vs England ===
Malaysia
5
Istora Gelora Bung Karno, Court 3
11 May 2008, 13:00 UTC+7

England
0

			1	2	3
1	(Malaysia) (England)	Lee Chong Wei; Andrew Smith	21; 17	21; 15
2	(Malaysia) (England)	Choong Tan Fook / Lee Wan Wah; Robert Adcock / Robin Middleton	21; 19	21; 16
3	(Malaysia) (England)	Wong Choong Hann; Rajiv Ouseph	22; 20	21; 16
4	(Malaysia) (England)	Koo Kien Keat / Tan Boon Heong; Chris Adcock / Chris Langridge	21; 12	21; 12
5	(Malaysia) (England)	Muhammad Hafiz Hashim; Ben Beckman	21; 15	21; 14

=== South Korea vs England ===
South Korea
1
Istora Gelora Bung Karno, Court 3
12 May 2008, 08:00 UTC+7

England
4

			1	2	3
1	(South Korea) (England)	Hong Ji-hoon; Andrew Smith	19; 21	21; 18	16; 21
2	(South Korea) (England)	Lee Yong-dae / Shon Seung-mo; Robert Adcock / Robin Middleton	21; 19	21; 15
3	(South Korea) (England)	Lee Jae-jin; Rajiv Ouseph	11; 21	19; 21
4	(South Korea) (England)	Lee Hyun-il / Park Sung-hwan; Chris Adcock / Chris Langridge	16; 21	12; 21
5	(South Korea) (England)	Hwang Ji-man; Nathan Rice	11; 21	18; 21

=== Malaysia vs South Korea ===
Malaysia
4
Istora Gelora Bung Karno, Court 4
12 May 2008, 18:00 UTC+7

South Korea
1

			1	2	3
1	(Malaysia) (South Korea)	Lee Chong Wei; Shon Seung-mo	21; 14	21; 14
2	(Malaysia) (South Korea)	Wong Choong Hann; Hong Ji-hoon	21; 14	21; 10
3	(Malaysia) (South Korea)	Choong Tan Fook / Lee Wan Wah; Jung Jae-sung / Lee Jae-jin	22; 20	10; 21	16; 21
4	(Malaysia) (South Korea)	Muhammad Hafiz Hashim; Hwang Ji-man	21; 5	21; 11
5	(Malaysia) (South Korea)	Koo Kien Keat / Tan Boon Heong; Hong Ji-hoon / Lee Yong-dae	23; 21	21; 19

== Group C ==
Pos	Team	Pld	W	L	MF	MA	MD	GF	GA	GD	PF	PA	PD	Pts	Qualification
1	Denmark	2	2	0	8	2	+6	18	4	+14	448	315	+133	2	Quarter-finals
2	Japan	2	1	1	7	3	+4	14	8	+6	434	359	+75	1	Round of 16
3	New Zealand	2	0	2	0	10	−10	0	20	−20	212	420	−208	0	Round of 16

Source: BadmintonCN

=== Denmark vs New Zealand ===
Denmark
5
Istora Gelora Bung Karno, Court 1
11 May 2008, 13:00 UTC+7

New Zealand
0

			1	2	3
1	(Denmark) (New Zealand)	Kenneth Jonassen; John Moody	21; 8	21; 13
2	(Denmark) (New Zealand)	Lars Paaske / Jonas Rasmussen; Nathan Hannam / Henry Tam	21; 9	21; 10
3	(Denmark) (New Zealand)	Peter Gade; Joe Wu	21; 4	21; 11
4	(Denmark) (New Zealand)	Jens Eriksen / Martin Lundgaard Hansen; Craig Cooper / John Moody	21; 12	21; 12
5	(Denmark) (New Zealand)	Joachim Persson; Kevin Dennerly-Minturn	21; 7	21; 5

=== Japan vs New Zealand ===
Japan
5
Istora Gelora Bung Karno, Court 1
12 May 2008, 08:00 UTC+7

New Zealand
0

			1	2	3
1	(Japan) (New Zealand)	Shōji Satō; John Moody	21; 17	21; 18
2	(Japan) (New Zealand)	Keita Masuda / Tadashi Ōtsuka; Nathan Hannam / Henry Tam	21; 9	21; 9
3	(Japan) (New Zealand)	Sho Sasaki; Joe Wu	21; 4	21; 12
4	(Japan) (New Zealand)	Keishi Kawaguchi / Naoki Kawamae; Craig Cooper / John Moody	21; 16	21; 14
5	(Japan) (New Zealand)	Hiroyuki Endo; Kevin Dennerly-Mintun	21; 6	21; 16

=== Denmark vs Japan ===
Denmark
3
Istora Gelora Bung Karno, Court 3
12 May 2008, 18:00 UTC+7

Japan
2

			1	2	3
1	(Denmark) (Japan)	Peter Gade; Shōji Satō	21; 19	14; 21	20; 22
2	(Denmark) (Japan)	Lars Paaske / Jonas Rasmussen; Shintaro Ikeda / Shuichi Sakamoto	16; 21	21; 17	21; 18
3	(Denmark) (Japan)	Joachim Persson; Sho Sasaki	21; 14	21; 17
4	(Denmark) (Japan)	Jens Eriksen / Martin Lundgaard Hansen; Keita Masuda / Tadashi Ōtsuka	17; 21	22; 20	23; 21
5	(Denmark) (Japan)	Jan Ø. Jørgensen; Kenichi Tago	21; 13	0; 21	0; 21

== Group D ==
Pos	Team	Pld	W	L	MF	MA	MD	GF	GA	GD	PF	PA	PD	Pts	Qualification
1	Indonesia (H)	2	2	0	8	2	+6	16	6	+10	442	320	+122	2	Quarter-finals
2	Thailand	2	1	1	5	5	0	12	10	+2	395	420	−25	1	Round of 16
3	Germany	2	0	2	2	8	−6	5	17	−12	352	449	−97	0	Round of 16

Source: BadmintonCN
(H) Host

=== Germany vs Thailand ===
Germany
2
Istora Gelora Bung Karno, Court 1
11 May 2008, 08:00 UTC+7

Thailand
3

			1	2	3
1	(Germany) (Thailand)	Marc Zwiebler; Boonsak Ponsana	17; 21	19; 21
2	(Germany) (Thailand)	Kristof Hopp / Ingo Kindervater; Tesana Panvisvas / Sudket Prapakamol	22; 20	21; 17
3	(Germany) (Thailand)	Dieter Domke; Poompat Sapkulchananart	12; 21	21; 19	21; 16
4	(Germany) (Thailand)	Michael Fuchs / Roman Spitko; Songphon Anugritayawon / Nuttaphon Narkthong	19; 21	21; 23
5	(Germany) (Thailand)	Marcel Reuter; Tanongsak Saensomboonsuk	14; 21	19; 21

=== Indonesia vs Thailand ===
Indonesia
3
Istora Gelora Bung Karno, Court 2
11 May 2008, 18:00 UTC+7

Thailand
2

			1	2	3
1	(Indonesia) (Thailand)	Sony Dwi Kuncoro; Boonsak Ponsana	17; 21	15; 21
2	(Indonesia) (Thailand)	Markis Kido / Hendra Setiawan; Nuttaphon Narkthong / Tesana Panvisvas	21; 11	21; 16
3	(Indonesia) (Thailand)	Taufik Hidayat; Tanongsak Saensomboonsuk	21; 23	18; 21
4	(Indonesia) (Thailand)	Hendra Aprida Gunawan / Joko Riyadi; Songphon Anugritayawon / Sudket Prapakamol	17; 21	21; 8	21; 12
5	(Indonesia) (Thailand)	Simon Santoso; Pakkawat Vilailak	21; 11	21; 9

=== Indonesia vs Germany ===
Indonesia
5
Istora Gelora Bung Karno, Court 2
12 May 2008, 13:00 UTC+7

Germany
0

			1	2	3
1	(Indonesia) (Germany)	Sony Dwi Kuncoro; Marc Zwiebler	21; 10	21; 11
2	(Indonesia) (Germany)	Markis Kido / Hendra Setiawan; Michael Fuchs / Roman Spitko	18; 21	21; 12	21; 7
3	(Indonesia) (Germany)	Taufik Hidayat; Dieter Domke	21; 10	21; 16
4	(Indonesia) (Germany)	Nova Widianto / Candra Wijaya; Tim Dettmann / Johannes Schoettler	21; 17	21; 17
5	(Indonesia) (Germany)	Simon Santoso; Sven Eric Kastens	21; 14	21; 11
