= Hendra Setiawan =

Indonesian badminton player (born 1984)

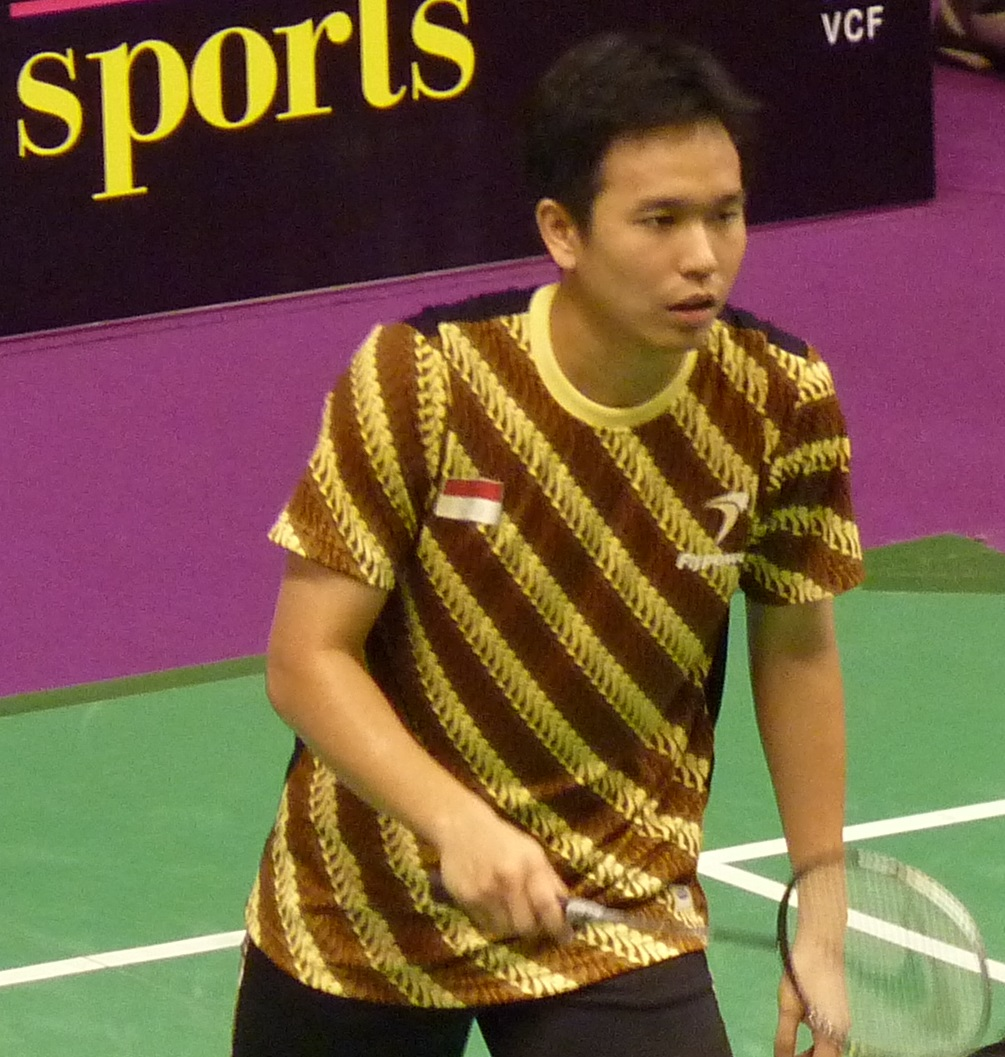
- Setiawan in 2010

Personal information
- Born: 25 August 1984 (age 42) Pemalang, Central Java, Indonesia
- Years active: 2001-2025
- Height: 1.83 m (6 ft 0 in)
- Weight: 72 kg (159 lb)
- Spouse: Sandiani Arief (m. 2011)

Sport
- Country: Indonesia
- Sport: Badminton
- Handedness: Right
- Coached by: Christian Hadinata; Sigit Pamungkas; Herry Iman Pierngadi; Aryono Miranat

Men's doubles
- Career record: 631 wins, 240 losses
- Highest ranking: 1 (with Markis Kido 27 September 2007); 1 (with Mohammad Ahsan 21 November 2013); 20 (with Tan Boon Heong 30 November 2017)
- BWF profile
Medal record
Men's badminton
Representing Indonesia
Olympic Games
Gold medal – first place	2008 Beijing	Men's doubles
World Championships
Gold medal – first place	2007 Kuala Lumpur	Men's doubles
Gold medal – first place	2013 Guangzhou	Men's doubles
Gold medal – first place	2015 Jakarta	Men's doubles
Gold medal – first place	2019 Basel	Men's doubles
Silver medal – second place	2022 Tokyo	Men's doubles
Bronze medal – third place	2010 Paris	Men's doubles
World Cup
Gold medal – first place	2006 Yiyang	Men's doubles
Sudirman Cup
Silver medal – second place	2007 Glasgow	Mixed team
Bronze medal – third place	2009 Guangzhou	Mixed team
Bronze medal – third place	2015 Dongguan	Mixed team
Bronze medal – third place	2019 Nanning	Mixed team
Thomas Cup
Gold medal – first place	2020 Aarhus	Men's team
Silver medal – second place	2010 Kuala Lumpur	Men's team
Silver medal – second place	2016 Kunshan	Men's team
Silver medal – second place	2022 Bangkok	Men's team
Bronze medal – third place	2006 Sendai & Tokyo	Men's team
Bronze medal – third place	2008 Jakarta	Men's team
Bronze medal – third place	2014 New Delhi	Men's team
Bronze medal – third place	2018 Bangkok	Men's team
Asian Games
Gold medal – first place	2010 Guangzhou	Men's doubles
Gold medal – first place	2014 Incheon	Men's doubles
Bronze medal – third place	2006 Doha	Men's doubles
Bronze medal – third place	2006 Doha	Men's team
Bronze medal – third place	2010 Guangzhou	Men's team
Asian Championships
Gold medal – first place	2005 Hyderabad	Men's doubles
Gold medal – first place	2009 Suwon	Men's doubles
Silver medal – second place	2003 Jakarta	Men's doubles
Silver medal – second place	2015 Wuhan	Men's doubles
Asia Team Championships
Gold medal – first place	2016 Hyderabad	Men's team
Gold medal – first place	2018 Alor Setar	Men's team
Gold medal – first place	2020 Manila	Men's team
SEA Games
Gold medal – first place	2003 Vietnam	Men's team
Gold medal – first place	2005 Manila	Men's doubles
Gold medal – first place	2007 Nakhon Ratchasima	Men's doubles
Gold medal – first place	2007 Nakhon Ratchasima	Men's team
Gold medal – first place	2009 Vientiane	Men's doubles
Gold medal – first place	2009 Vientiane	Men's team
Gold medal – first place	2011 Jakarta–Palembang	Men's team
Silver medal – second place	2005 Manila	Men's team
Silver medal – second place	2011 Jakarta–Palembang	Men's doubles
World Senior Championships
Gold medal – first place	2025 Pattaya	Men's doubles 40+
Gold medal – first place	2025 Pattaya	Mixed doubles 35+
World Junior Championships
Bronze medal – third place	2002 Pretoria	Mixed team
Asian Junior Championships
Gold medal – first place	2002 Kuala Lumpur	Boys' team
Bronze medal – third place	2001 Taipei	Mixed doubles
Bronze medal – third place	2001 Taipei	Boys' team
Bronze medal – third place	2002 Kuala Lumpur	Boys' doubles
Bronze medal – third place	2002 Kuala Lumpur	Mixed doubles

Hendra Setiawan (born 25 August 1984) is an Indonesian former professional badminton player. He is an Olympic Games gold medalist, four-time World Champion, two-time Asian Games gold medalist, and two-time All England champion. With these achievements, Setiawan has collected all major individual titles in badminton. He is considered to be one of the greatest Indonesian badminton players of all time.

Setiawan was ranked first in the men's doubles with two different partners. Together with Markis Kido, he achieved the world no. 1 in September 2007, and with Mohammad Ahsan in November 2013. He has won six gold medals at the SEA Games, 3 in the men's doubles, and 3 in the team event. Teamed-up with Kido, he won the men's doubles titles at the 2005 and 2009 Asian Championships; the 2006 World Cup; the 2007 World Championships; the 2008 Olympic Games; and the 2010 Asian Games.

Setiawan had also played in the mixed doubles discipline, and his best result was in 2010 Indonesia Open, finishing as runner-ups with his partner Anastasia Russkikh from Russia.

His other notable partnership in men's doubles was with Mohammad Ahsan (2012–2024). They won numerous prestigious titles including the 2013, 2015 and 2019 World Championships; the gold medal in 2014 Asian Games, winning the All England twice, and winning three times at the BWF Superseries Finals. Setiawan currently holds the record as the oldest World Championships title holder, after winning the 2019 edition at the age of 35.

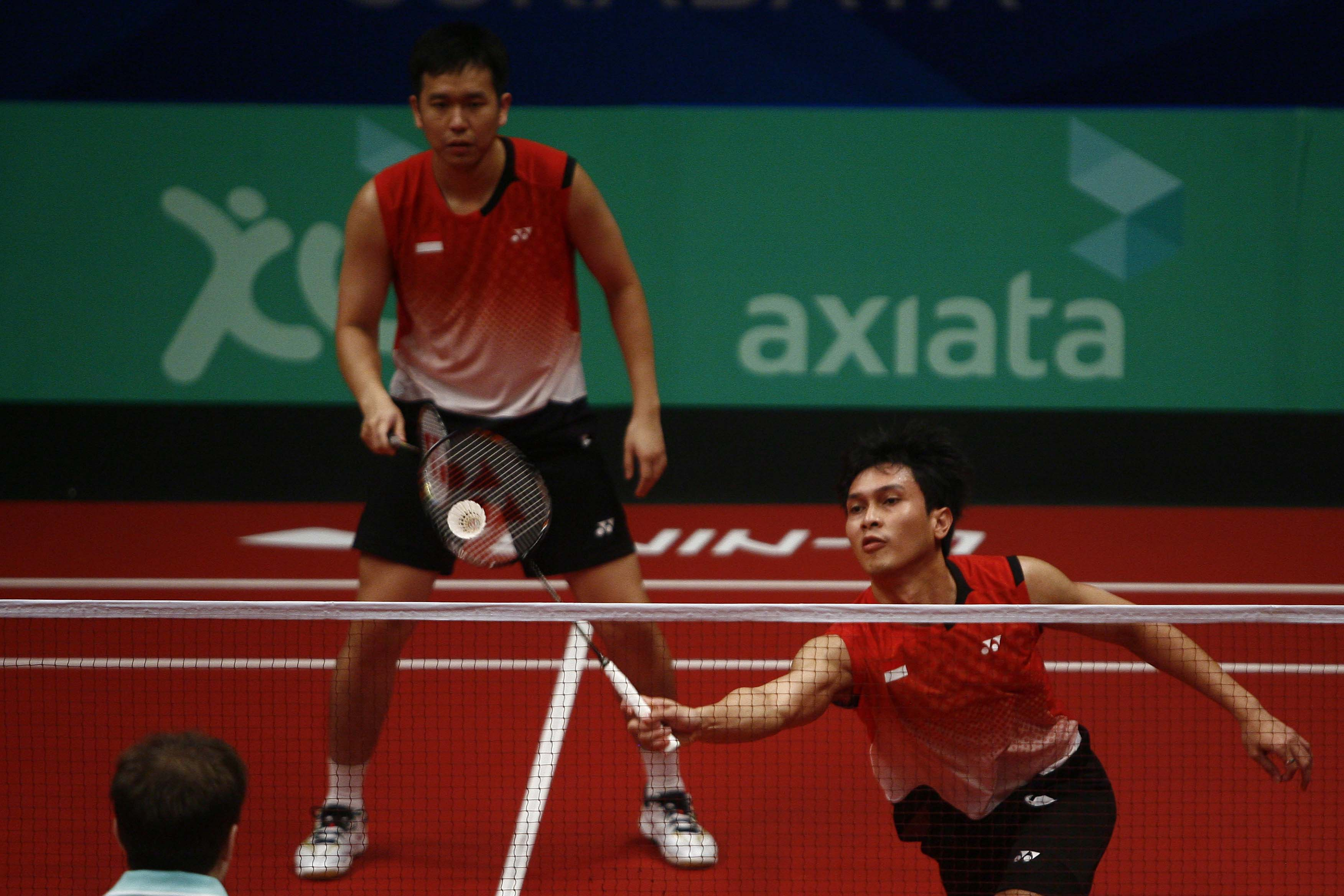
Setiawan and Ahsan at the 2013 Axiata Cup

== Early life ==
Hendra Setiawan was born in Pemalang, Central Java to Ferry Yugianto and Kartika Christyaningrum. He is the youngest of three siblings. Setiawan became interested in badminton when he saw his father playing the sport, and he took up the sport at the age of seven, training at the Sinar Mutiara Tegal club. After graduating from middle school, Setiawan decided to move to Jakarta, train in the Jaya Raya club, and continue his education at the Ragunan Sports School.

== Career ==
=== 2001–2002: Career beginnings ===
Setiawan began his international journey at the 2001 Asian Junior Championships, where he won the bronze medals in the boys' team and mixed doubles events. He then claimed the boys' team gold medal in the 2002 Asian Junior Championships, where the Indonesian team beat South Korea in the final. In the individual event, Setiawan was defeated in the semi-finals and won the bronze medals in the boys' doubles with Riyadi, and also in the mixed doubles with Devi Sukma Wijaya. He played at the 2002 World Junior Championships held in Pretoria, South Africa, and the Indonesia team won the bronze medal after beating Thailand 3–1 in the bronze medal play-off. At the age of seventeen, Setiawan partnered with Joko Riyadi to reach the finals of the 2002 Singapore Satellite, and the duo finished runner-up to Donny Prasetyo and Denny Setiawan.

=== 2003–2005: Southeast Asian and Asian champion ===
In 2003, Setiawan made his debut with Markis Kido at the Asian Championships, finishing as runner-up, thus winning a silver medal. He then won his first gold medal with the Indonesian team at the 2003 SEA Games in Vietnam. Setiawan reached his first IBF Grand Prix finals in the 2004 Denmark Open, but he and Kido were defeated by the home pairing of Lars Paaske and Jonas Rasmussen in straight games.

In 2005, Setiawan and Kido were qualified to compete in the top tournaments, as they had accumulated enough ranking points to do so. They won their first Grand Prix title in the Indonesia Open, beating their senior compatriots Sigit Budiarto and Candra Wijaya in the final. The duo also crowned as Asian Champion after winning the 2005 Asian Badminton Championships held in India. In November–December, Setiawan took part in his second SEA Games, and won a gold medal in the men's doubles with Kido and a silver in the men's team event.

=== 2006: World Cup title ===
Setiawan made his first appearance in the Thomas Cup in 2006. The Indonesian men's team eventually finished 3rd, losing to China in the semi-finals 0–3. At the 2006 Indonesia Open, ranked 14th in the world, Setiawan and Kido advanced to the final of the 2006 Indonesia Open after beating Jung Jae-sung and Lee Yong-dae of South Korea in the semi-finals. They were unable to defend their title after being defeated by the 2000 Olympic champions, Tony Gunawan and Candra Wijaya in the final. Bouncing back from the loss, they later won their first title of the year in the Hong Kong Open. At the 2006 World Championships, Setiawan and Kido lost in the quarter-finals to England's Robert Blair and Anthony Clark. This was their second loss to Blair and Clark, where earlier in the year they were also beaten in the second round of the All England Open. In October, Setiawan and Kido, then ranked 9th in the world, won the China Open by beating reigning World champions Cai Yun and Fu Haifeng in the final in straight games. Setiawan and Kido then claimed the 2006 World Cup, beating the Malaysian pairing of Lin Woon Fui and Fairuzizuan Tazari in the final. He competed in the 2006 Asian Games in Doha, Qatar, but lost in the semi-finals of both the men's doubles with Kido and in the men's team, settling for bronze medals in both events.

=== 2007: World champion and world number 1 ===
Beginning without winning any tournaments in early 2007, in August, Setiawan and Kido won the World Championships title in August, defeating Jung Jae-sung and Lee Yong-dae in the final, 21–19, 21–19 in straight games. Prior to the World Championships, their best achievement in the first half of 2007 was being the runner-up at the China Masters. After the World Championships, they reached the semi-finals in the Japan Open and won the Chinese Taipei Open. These wins propelled Setiawan and Kido to world number 1 on the BWF World Rankings. Later in 2007, Setiawan and Kido managed to defend their title in the China and Hong Kong Opens. They also reached semi-finals in the Macau and Denmark Opens, but they were defeated by Malaysian pair Koo Kien Keat and Tan Boon Heong in both tournaments. Setiawan and Kido had never won a single match to Koo and Tan since their first meeting in January 2007 at the Malaysia Open, and the head-to-head record between the pairs stood at 0–4. (Note: The head-to-head record between Setiawan and Kido against Koo and Tan after the 2007 Denmark Open is actually 0–5 if the 2006 Asian Games results are entered by the BWF.) Setiawan then made his third appearance at the SEA Games in Thailand, and helped Indonesia win the men's team gold. Setiawan then won his second men's doubles gold medal at the Games with Kido, defeating Hendri Saputra and Hendra Wijaya in the final.

=== 2008: Olympic champion ===
Setiawan and his partner, Markis Kido, opened the 2008 season by winning the Malaysia Open. Unfortunately, in the following tournaments, they were defeated in the early rounds, namely in the Korea and All England Opens. They then reached the final of the Swiss Open, but lost to Korean pair Jung Jae-sung and Lee Yong-dae in rubber games. Setiawan played at the Thomas Cup held in Jakarta, but he and Indonesia team lost 0–3 in the semi-finals match against South Korea. Later in August, Setiawan and Kido participated in the Beijing Olympics games, managing to make it to the finals. The finals were held on 17 August, the Independence Day of Indonesia. In the final, Setiawan and Kido won the gold medal, beating the home pair of Cai Yun and Fu Haifeng in three games, 12–21, 21–11, 21–16.

After the Olympics, Setiawan and Kido won the next three tournaments in a row, the China Masters, Denmark Open, and the French Open. Their tournament streak came to an end when they lost to arch-rivals Koo Kien Keat and Tan Boon Heong in the quarter-finals of the Hong Kong Open. They then topped the BWF Super Series ranking and qualified to compete at the Super Series Masters Finals held in Kota Kinabalu, Malaysia. They finished in the semi-finals after being defeated by Jung Jae-sung and Lee Yong-dae of South Korea.

=== 2009–2012: Asian Games champion, splitting up with Kido ===
Setiawan started the 2009 season as the semi-finalists in the Malaysia Open with his partner Kido who was injured at the time. As the only Indonesian participant in the 2009 Asian Championships held in Suwon, South Korea, Setiawan and Kido managed to win their second Asian Championships title, beating local favorites Ko Sung-hyun and Yoo Yeon-seong in the final. In May, Setiawan competed at the Sudirman Cup in Guangzhou, China. Since Kido still had an injury, Setiawan paired with Mohammad Ahsan in the semi-finals match against South Korea. However, Setiawan and Ahsan lost to Jung Jae-sung and Lee Yong-dae in the tie decider, losing 9–21, 19–21 in straight games. Indonesia lost to South Korea 1–3 overall. In June, they reached the finals of the Singapore Open and reached the semi-finals of the Indonesia Open. After skipping the 2009 BWF World Championships, Setiawan and Kido won their second title of the year at the Japan Open. Later, they successfully defended their title at the French Open. Despite being ranked second in the BWF Super Series rankings, Setiawan and Kido chose to skip the Super Series Masters Finals to prepare for the upcoming SEA Games. Setiawan and Kido then won their third men's doubles gold medal at the SEA Games, and also helped Indonesia to defend their gold medal in the men's team event. Prior to the SEA Games, Setiawan and Kido had submitted their resignation letters to Badminton Association of Indonesia, and chose to train at their club, Jaya Raya Jakarta.

Setiawan began the 2010 season as an independent player, and competed in the National Championships in January. He and Kido, who also left the national team, won the National Championships title. Setiawan and Kido played at the All England Open, and finished in the semi-finals, their best performance while competing in that tournament at the time. They were then called to join the national team training center to compete in the Thomas Cup. Indonesia finished runner-up at that competition after losing to China in the final. While competing in the men's doubles with Kido, Setiawan started a new partnership in the mixed doubles with Anastasia Russkikh of Russia. His debut with Russkikh did not go well, since they were eliminated in the qualifying round of the Singapore Open. He and Kido also lost in the semi-finals to the Chinese Taipei pair of Fang Chieh-min and Lee Sheng-mu. Setiawan and Russkikh then started to gain traction after reaching the finals of the Indonesia Open, but they failed to win the title after being defeated by the Polish pair of Robert Mateusiak and Nadieżda Zięba.

Setiawan finally won his first international title of the year with Kido at the Malaysia Grand Prix Gold. He and his partner, Kido, beating Hendra Aprida Gunawan and Alvent Yulianto in the final. Setiawan and Kido competed at the BWF World Championships in Paris, and won a bronze medal after being defeated by Cai Yun and Fu Haifeng in the semi-finals. At the Europe tour in October–November, Setiawan and Kido finished runner-up at the Denmark Open and semi-finals at the French Open. In the mixed doubles with Russkikh, the duo lost in the first round in Denmark, and in the quarter-finals in France. Setiawan and Kido later won the gold medal in the 2010 Asian Games in Guangzhou, China after beating Koo Kien Keat and Tan Boon Heong. Saving 2 match points in the second set, they won 16–21, 26–24, 21–19, winning their first Asian Games gold. Setiawan and Kido ended the 2010 season as finalists in the Hong Kong Open. This qualified them to compete at the Super Series Finals which would be held in January 2011.

In 2011, Setiawan and his partner, Markis Kido competed at the 2010 BWF Super Series Finals. They were forced to withdraw from the competition after Setiawan sustained knee injuries in a group match. Setiawan then had a title drought in 2011, where he never won any tournaments that year either in the men's doubles with Kido or in the mixed doubles with Russkikh. His best performance at that year was only as semi-finalists in the men's doubles at the Indonesia, Japan and Denmark Open; as well as being semi-finalists in the mixed doubles at the All England Open. Setiawan and Kido then competed at the SEA Games, helping the Indonesia men's team to defend their gold medal. In the men's doubles event however, Setiawan and Kido failed to defend their title, winning a silver medal after losing to Mohammad Ahsan and Bona Septano in the final. Setiawan-Kido then closed the 2011 season ranked as world number 10.

In 2012, apart from competing with Kido in the men's doubles, Setiawan also played in the mixed doubles with new partner Vita Marissa. Setiawan and Marissa started their debut in Europe tour in February–March, but gave undesiring results after losing in the early rounds at the German, All England and Swiss Opens. His best achievements with Marissa were reaching the quarter-finals at the Singapore Open. In men's doubles, Setiawan and Kido clinched the men's doubles title at the Australia and Singapore Open. However, they did not obtain enough points to compete at the 2012 Summer Olympics in London. Setiawan then split up with Kido at the end of 2012. Later, Setiawan decided to rejoin the Indonesia national training center, and paired up with a new partner, Mohammad Ahsan, which he had previously been paired with in team competitions and international tournaments. They made their individual event debut at the Denmark Open, and finished as the semi-finalists after being defeated by Shin Baek-cheol and Yoo Yeon-seong of Korea.

=== 2013–2016: Second World Championships, first All England, second Asian Games and third World Championships title ===
In 2013, Setiawan and Mohammad Ahsan won their first title as a pair in the Malaysia Open, beating the Korean pair of Ko Sung-hyun and Lee Yong-dae in the final. They later won five tournaments in a row, starting in the Australia Open in April; the Indonesia and Singapore Opens in June, with another victory against Ko and Lee in both tournaments; the BWF World Championships in August; and later at the Japan Open in September. At the World Championships, they won the title without dropping a single set to their opponents on the way to the final. Their winning streak were then stopped by Ronald Alexander and Selvanus Geh in the quarter-finals of the Indonesia Grand Prix Gold. They then suffered back-to-back losses to Lee yong-dae with his new partner, Yoo Yeon-seong, in the final of the Denmark Open, first round of the China Open, and in the semi-finals of the Hong Kong Open. In December, they clinched the season-ending tournament title, the BWF Superseries Finals, defeating Koreans Kim Gi-jung and Kim Sa-rang in straight games. For their achievements in 2013, Setiawan and Ahsan took the number one position in the BWF world ranking in November 2013.

In March 2014, Setiawan and Ahsan won the All England Open after beating the Japanese pairing of Hiroyuki Endo and Kenichi Hayakawa in the final. This was their first All England title for both Setiawan and Ahsan as a pair. Later, they were included in the Indonesian squad at the 2014 Thomas Cup in New Delhi. At the Thomas Cup, Setiawan and Ahsan won their first match against Lee Yong-dae and Yoo Yeon-seong, leading Indonesia to a 3–2 win in the quarter-finals tie against South Korea. Indonesia was then defeated by Malaysia in the semi-finals. Setiawan and Ahsan again lost to Lee and Yoo in the finals of the Japan and Indonesia Opens. They then recorded their second win over the Korean pair Lee and Yoo in the men's doubles final of the 2014 Asian Games, claiming Setiawan's second Asian Games gold. In November, Setiawan and Ahsan won the Hong Kong Open. They later played at an invitational tournament, named "Glory to the King", and won the men's doubles title after beating the home pair of Bodin Isara and Pakkawat Vilailak in the final.

Setiawan and Ahsan won three titles in 2015, the Malaysia Open, BWF World Championships, and at the Dubai World Superseries Finals. They defeated Lee Yong-dae and Yoo Yeon-seong in the final of the Malaysia Open in April. At the Asian Championships, they failed to captured the title, losing to Lee and Yoo in the final in a close rubber game. At the Sudirman Cup, in the semi-final, Setiawan and Ahsan, defeated the four-time World Champions Cai Yun and Fu Haifeng in their opening match, but China took the next 3 matches to win 3–1 in their overall tie. Setiawan and Ahsan then lost in the semi-finals of the Indonesia and Chinese Taipei Opens. The duo then won their second World Championships title as a pair (third for Setiawan), after winning the 2015 BWF World Championships in their home country. They defeated Lee and Yoo in straight games in the semi-finals and in the final, they defeated the Chinese pair of Liu Xiaolong and Qiu Zihan 21–17, 21–14. After the World Championships, they were unable to win a title for the rest for the year, with their best results being semi-finalists at the French Open and Hong Kong Open. Setiawan and Ahsan won their second season-ending title at the Dubai World Superseries Finals after defeating Chai Biao and Hong Wei in the final.

Setiawan opened the 2016 season by winning the Thailand Masters with Mohammad Ahsan. He played at the Asia Team Championships, and led the Indonesia team to the finals. In the finals, Indonesia won the title after beating Japan in the final. Later, Setiawan and Ahsan competed at the Thomas Cup, and the team finished runner-up to Denmark. In August, Setiawan made his second appearance at the Olympic Games by competing in Rio 2016. Partnering with Ahsan as the second seed, the duo were eliminated in the group stage. While competing in 2016 with Ahsan, the pair's performance showed a decline compared to previous years, resulting in the Badminton Association of Indonesia deciding to split up the pair in the end of the 2016 season, each of them focusing on their individual careers with different partners. Setiawan tried to pair up with Rian Agung Saputro and Berry Angriawan, but the pairs did not perform up to standard and failed to deliver results. On 14 November, Setiawan announced his retirement from the national team, and left the team on 1 December.

=== 2017: Partnership with Tan Boon Heong ===
After leaving the national team and playing as an independent player, he partnered up with his former rival, Tan Boon Heong, from Malaysia in 2017. They reached a career-high-rank of 20th on 30 November 2017. The only final the duo made was in the Australian Open, where they lost to Takeshi Kamura and Keigo Sonoda of Japan, 17–21, 19–21. They split up after Setiawan was denied by PBSI of playing together with Tan in the 2018 World Championships.

=== 2018–2019: Regrouping with Ahsan; second All England title and fourth World Championships title ===
In 2018, Setiawan rejoined the Indonesia national training squad as an internship player. He first paired with Rian Agung Saputro to compete at the Indonesia Masters, but the duo were defeated by their compatriots Marcus Fernaldi Gideon and Kevin Sanjaya Sukamuljo in the second round. Setiawan and Saputro also played at the 2018 Asia Team Championships, where Indonesia thrashed China 3–1 to retain the title. Later in February, Setiawan reunited with Mohammad Ahsan and played at the India Open, and they were beaten again by Gideon and Sukamuljo in the semi-finals. To collect BWF ranking points, Setiawan and Ahsan participated at the lower-graded Malaysia International Challenge, and emerged victorious after defeating the home pair of Aaron Chia and Soh Wooi Yik in the final. At the 2018 Thomas Cup, the Indonesia men's team failed to win the title after losing out to China 1–3 in the semi-finals. In July, Setiawan and Ahsan won the Singapore Open by beating Ou Xuanyi and Ren Xiangyu of China in the finals. In the rest of 2018 tournaments, Setiawan and Ahsan best results were being semi-finalists in the Denmark, Fuzhou China, and the Hong Kong Opens. The duo qualified to compete at the World Tour Finals, but at that tournament, they were eliminated in the group stage. He and his partner ended the 2018 season ranked as world number 9.

Setiawan and Ahsan were one of the most dominant pairs in the 2019 season, where they entered 11 finals and became the first men's doubles pair to win 3 major titles in a year. Their achievements started at the Indonesia Masters, when the duo finished runner-up to their junior compatriots Gideon and Sukamuljo. The first victory came at the All England Open, when they defeated Malaysia's Aaron Chia and Soh Wooi Yik in the final. This was their second All England title as a pair. They then lost in the finals of the Singapore Open to Takeshi Kamura and Keigo Sonoda of Japan. Setiawan and Ahsan captured their second World Tour title of the year at the New Zealand Open when they beat Japanese pairing of Hiroyuki Endo and Yuta Watanabe in the final in a close rubber game. Setiawan also participated in his fifth Sudirman Cup, and took the bronze medal after Indonesia being defeated by Japan in the semi-finals. In July, they reached two finals, the Indonesia Open and Japan Open, both being runner-ups after losing to Gideon and Sukamuljo in both tournaments. In late August, Setiawan captured his fourth World Championships title. He and Ahsan defeated the up-and-coming Japanese duo Takuro Hoki and Yugo Kobayashi in the final. The final was held on Setiawan's birthday, making him the oldest player to have won a World Championships title at the age of 35 years and 0 days. These results also took them to move up to second place in the BWF rankings. Later in the final of the China and Denmark Opens, they became runner-ups again after losing to Gideon and Sukamuljo. Setiawan and Ahsan have never won a match against Gideon and Sukamuljo in the last 5 meetings in 2019. In the final of the Hong Kong Open, they lost to the Korean pair of Choi Sol-gyu and Seo Seung-jae. At the end of the year, Setiawan and Ahsan defeated Hiroyuki Endo and Yuta Watanabe, 24–22, 21–19 in straight games to win the BWF World Tour Finals.

=== 2020–2022: First Thomas Cup title ===
Setiawan and his partner, Mohammad Ahsan opened the 2020 season as semi-finalists in the Malaysia Masters. They then reached the finals of the Indonesia Masters, but still were unable to overcome Gideon and Sukamuljo and lost in straight games. At the All England Open, the duo were unable to defend the title after losing in the quarter-finals to Hiroyuki Endo and Yuta Watanabe. In January 2021, Setiawan and Ahsan competed at the 2020 Asian Leg tournament held in Thailand. They first reached the quarter-finals in the Yonex Thailand Open, and then finished as semi-finalists in the Toyota Thailand Open. The duo qualified to play at the BWF World Tour Finals, and reached the final after being able to avenge the defeat to the Korean pair Choi Sol-gyu and Seo Seung-jae from the Yonex Thailand Open, but lost the finals to the Chinese Taipei pair Lee Yang and Wang Chi-lin who previously beat them at the Toyota Thailand Open. In July 2021, Setiawan made his third appearance at the Summer Olympics, at Tokyo 2020. Competing with Mohammad Ahsan as the 2nd seeds, he finished fourth after being defeated by Malaysia's Aaron Chia and Soh Wooi Yik in the bronze medal match. In October, at Aarhus, Denmark, Setiawan finally added the Thomas Cup to his grand list of achievements, where the Indonesian team beat China in the final 3–0, claiming Indonesia's first title in 19 years. Their best results in the rest of 2021 season were reaching the quarter-finals in the French Open and the Hylo Open.

Setiawan and Ahsan began the 2022 season as finalists in the India Open. In March, they stormed into their third All England final, losing to compatriots Muhammad Shohibul Fikri and Bagas Maulana in the final. At the Korea Open, they lost in the semi-finals to Seo Seung-jae and Kang Min-hyuk. They then reached their second final of the year in the Malaysia Masters, but lost to compatriots Fajar Alfian and Muhammad Rian Ardianto in the final in straight games. Later in August, Setiawan and Ahsan entered their fourth BWF World Championships final as a pair. They lost to Malaysia's Aaron Chia and Soh Wooi Yik in straight games, 19–21, 14–21, after initially leading 19–16 in the first game, losing in 40 minutes. The duo qualified to play at the BWF World Tour Finals, and reached the final but lost to the 4th seed Chinese pair Liu Yuchen and Ou Xuanyi.

=== 2023: Climbing back from struggles ===
Setiawan and his partner, Mohammad Ahsan opened the 2023 season at the Malaysia Open, but they were defeated in the quarter-finals round to the Korean pair of Kang Min-hyuk and Seo Seung-jae. In the next tournament the following week, Ahsan and Setiawan lost in he first round of India Open to the unseeded Chinese pair Liang Weikeng and Wang Chang. Afterwards, in their home tournament, Indonesia Masters, Ahsan and Setiawan lost in the second round to juniors and eventual champions Leo Rolly Carnando and Daniel Marthin.

With the Indonesian federation skipping the German Open, Setiawan resumed competition at the All England in March. Him and Ahsan managed to create an all-Indonesian final and finished as runner-ups to Fajar Alfian and Muhammad Rian Ardianto.

Setiawan competed at the Asian Championships in Dubai, but lost in quarter-finals to eventual champions Satwiksairaj Rankireddy and Chirag Shetty.

In May, Setiawan competed in the second Asian Tour at the Malaysia Masters. Unfortunately, he lost in the quarter-finals from eventual finalist Malaysian youngster Man Wei Chong and Tee Kai Wun.

In June, Setiawan competed at the Singapore Open, but lost in the second round to Korean pair Choi Sol-gyu and Kim Won-ho. In the next tour, they competed at the home tournament, Indonesia Open, but lost in the second round from their compatriot Indonesian pair Pramudya Kusumawardana and Yeremia Rambitan in three games.

In July, Setiawan competed at the Canada Open, but lost in the quarter-finals from 5th seed Chinese Taipei pair Lee Yang and Wang Chi-lin. In the East Asian Tour, he competed at the Japan Open, but lost in the quarter-finals against 1st seed fellow Indonesian pair Fajar Alfian and Muhammad Rian Ardianto for second times this year.

In early August, Setiawan competed at the Australian Open, but lost in the second round from Taiwanese pair Lu Ching-yao and Yang Po-han in straight games. He was unfortunately unable to secure another World Championships medal after exiting in the quarter-finals to Korean pair Kang Min-hyuk and Seo Seung-jae in straight games.

=== 2024-2025: Retirement from international badminton ===
Setiawan's final playing year in 2024 was marked with multiple first- and second-round exits, with only a single final appearance at the Australian Open. Him and Ahsan lost to China's He Jiting/Ren Xiangyu in the finals.

Setiawan announced his retirement from international badminton in December 2024. His final appearance was at home tournament Indonesia Masters in January 2025, where he and Ahsan were honored with a tribute ceremony and an exhibition match against Kevin Sanjaya Sukamuljo and Seo Seung-jae.

In March 2025, Setiawan began coaching fellow independent players Sabar Karyaman Gutama/Muhammad Reza Pahlevi Isfahani. A month later, he was appointed as the Deputy Executive Director of PB Jaya Raya, his former badminton club.

Setiawan competed at the 2025 BWF World Senior Championships di Bangkok, Thailand. He won two titles: one in the 40+ men's doubles with Tony Gunawan and another in the 35+ mixed doubles with Debby Susanto.

== Personal life ==
Setiawan has two older sisters, Silvia Anggraeni and Ivone Anggraeni. His sister Silvia was also a badminton player up until 1995, and after that married Setiawan's national team senior Hendrawan.

Setiawan married Sandiani Arief on 9 October 2011 in a ceremony held in JW Marriott Jakarta. His wife gave birth to fraternal twins on 19 February 2014 and another baby boy on 26 July 2017.

Setiawan also has a personal YouTube channel, where he uploads vlogs with fellow Indonesian players on the World Tour and family vlogs with his wife and kids. His channel has 223,000 subscribers as of January 2025.

Amongst fans and fellow players, Setiawan is well known for the contrast between his calm, no-nonsense demeanor and his many achievements. His surprise appearance coaching Tommy Sugiarto at the 2021 Denmark Open earned him the nickname 'Coach Naga Salju' ('snow dragon coach'), a parodic nickname based on his former coaches Herry Iman Pierngadi and Aryono Miranat who were titled 'Naga Api' ('fire dragon') and 'Naga Air' (water dragon) respectively. The nickname was once again used at the 2025 Indonesia Open semifinals, when Setiawan, this time as a professional coach to Gutama/Isfahani, faced off Herry Iman Pierngadi who coached Man Wei Chong/Tee Kai Wun.

== Awards and nominations ==
Award	Year	Category	Result	Ref.
AORI	2010	Best Male Athlete with Markis Kido	Won	
AORI	2013	Best Male Athlete with Mohammad Ahsan	Nominated	
AORI	2014	Best Male Athlete with Mohammad Ahsan	Won	
AORI	2015	Best Male Athlete with Mohammad Ahsan	Won	
BWF Awards	2013	BWF Best Male Player of the Year with Hendra Setiawan	Nominated	
BWF Awards	2019	BWF Best Male Player of the Year with Hendra Setiawan	Nominated	
Gatra Awards	2021	Sports Category with 2020 Thomas Cup squads	Won	
Golden Award SIWO PWI	2020	Best of the Best with Mohammad Ahsan	Won	
Golden Award SIWO PWI	2021	Best Team with 2020 Thomas Cup squads	Won	
KONI Award	2014	Best Athlete with Mohammad Ahsan	Won	
BPIP RI Award	2022	Ikon Prestasi Pancasila Kategori Olahraga	Won	

== Achievements ==
=== Olympic Games ===
Men's doubles
Year	Venue	Partner	Opponent	Score	Result	Ref.
2008	Beijing University of Technology Gymnasium, Beijing, China	(Indonesia) Markis Kido	(China) Cai Yun (China) Fu Haifeng	12–21, 21–11, 21–16	Gold	

=== BWF World Championships ===
Men's doubles
Year	Venue	Partner	Opponent	Score	Result	Ref.
2007	Putra Indoor Stadium, Kuala Lumpur, Malaysia	(Indonesia) Markis Kido	(South Korea) Jung Jae-sung (South Korea) Lee Yong-dae	21–19, 21–19	Gold	
2010	Stade Pierre de Coubertin, Paris, France	(Indonesia) Markis Kido	(China) Cai Yun (China) Fu Haifeng	16–21, 13–21	Bronze	
2013	Tianhe Sports Center, Guangzhou, China	(Indonesia) Mohammad Ahsan	(Denmark) Mathias Boe (Denmark) Carsten Mogensen	21–13, 23–21	Gold	
2015	Istora Senayan, Jakarta, Indonesia	(Indonesia) Mohammad Ahsan	(China) Liu Xiaolong (China) Qiu Zihan	21–17, 21–14	Gold	
2019	St. Jakobshalle, Basel, Switzerland	(Indonesia) Mohammad Ahsan	(Japan) Takuro Hoki (Japan) Yugo Kobayashi	25–23, 9–21, 21–15	Gold	
2022	Tokyo Metropolitan Gymnasium, Tokyo, Japan	(Indonesia) Mohammad Ahsan	(Malaysia) Aaron Chia (Malaysia) Soh Wooi Yik	19–21, 14–21	Silver	

=== World Cup ===
Men's doubles
Year	Venue	Partner	Opponent	Score	Result	Ref.
2006	Olympic Park, Yiyang, China	(Indonesia) Markis Kido	(Malaysia) Lin Woon Fui (Malaysia) Mohd Fairuzizuan Tazari	21–18, 21–15	Gold	

=== World Senior Championships ===
Men's doubles
Year	Age	Venue	Partner	Opponent	Score	Result	Ref.
2025	40+	Eastern National Sports Training Centre; Pattaya, Thailand	(United States) Tony Gunawan	(Thailand) Boonsak Ponsana (Thailand) Jakrapan Thanathiratham	21–18, 21–16	Gold	

Mixed doubles
Year	Age	Venue	Partner	Opponent	Score	Result	Ref.
2025	35+	Eastern National Sports Training Centre; Pattaya, Thailand	(Indonesia) Debby Susanto	(Thailand) Nawut Thanateeratam (Thailand) Peeraya Munkitamorn	21–5, 21–9	Gold	

=== Asian Games ===
Men's doubles
Year	Venue	Partner	Opponent	Score	Result	Ref.
2006	Aspire Hall 3, Doha, Qatar	(Indonesia) Markis Kido	(Malaysia) Koo Kien Keat (Malaysia) Tan Boon Heong	16–21, 13–21	Bronze	
2010	Tianhe Gymnasium, Guangzhou, China	(Indonesia) Markis Kido	(Malaysia) Koo Kien Keat (Malaysia) Tan Boon Heong	16–21, 26–24, 21–19	Gold	
2014	Gyeyang Gymnasium, Incheon, South Korea	(Indonesia) Mohammad Ahsan	(South Korea) Lee Yong-dae (South Korea) Yoo Yeon-seong	21–16, 16–21, 21–17	Gold	

=== Asian Championships ===
Men's doubles
Year	Venue	Partner	Opponent	Score	Result	Ref.
2003	Tennis Indoor Gelora Bung Karno, Jakarta, Indonesia	(Indonesia) Markis Kido	(South Korea) Lee Dong-soo (South Korea) Yoo Yong-sung	10–15, 11–15	Silver	
2005	Gachibowli Indoor Stadium, Hyderabad, India	(Indonesia) Markis Kido	(South Korea) Jung Jae-sung (South Korea) Lee Jae-jin	15–11, 15–7	Gold	
2009	Suwon Indoor Stadium, Suwon, South Korea	(Indonesia) Markis Kido	(South Korea) Ko Sung-hyun (South Korea) Yoo Yeon-seong	21–18, 26–24	Gold	
2015	Wuhan Sports Center Gymnasium, Wuhan, China	(Indonesia) Mohammad Ahsan	(South Korea) Lee Yong-dae (South Korea) Yoo Yeon-seong	21–18, 22–24, 19–21	Silver	

=== SEA Games ===
Men's doubles
Year	Venue	Partner	Opponent	Score	Result	Ref.
2005	PhilSports Arena, Pasig, Metro Manila, Philippines	(Indonesia) Markis Kido	(Indonesia) Luluk Hadiyanto (Indonesia) Alvent Yulianto	15–8, 7–15, 15–6	Gold	
2007	Wongchawalitkul University, Nakhon Ratchasima, Thailand	(Indonesia) Markis Kido	(Singapore) Hendri Saputra (Singapore) Hendra Wijaya	21–17, 21–12	Gold	
2009	Gym Hall 1, National Sports Complex, Vientiane, Laos	(Indonesia) Markis Kido	(Malaysia) Koo Kien Keat (Malaysia) Tan Boon Heong	21–17, 21–17	Gold	
2011	Istora Gelora Bung Karno, Jakarta, Indonesia	(Indonesia) Markis Kido	(Indonesia) Mohammad Ahsan (Indonesia) Bona Septano	23–25, 10–21	Silver	

=== Asian Junior Championships ===
Boys' doubles
Year	Venue	Partner	Opponent	Score	Result	Ref.
2002	Kuala Lumpur Badminton Stadium, Kuala Lumpur, Malaysia	(Indonesia) Joko Riyadi	(South Korea) Han Sang-hoon (South Korea) Kim Dae-sung	15–7, 10–15, 12–15	Bronze	

Mixed doubles
Year	Venue	Partner	Opponent	Score	Result	Ref.
2001	Taipei Gymnasium, Taipei, Taiwan	(Indonesia) Lina Marlina	(South Korea)		Bronze	
2002	Kuala Lumpur Badminton Stadium, Kuala Lumpur, Malaysia	(Indonesia) Devi Sukma Wijaya	(Indonesia) Markis Kido (Indonesia) Liliyana Natsir	5–11, 4–11	Bronze	

=== BWF World Tour (4 titles, 15 runners-up) ===
The BWF World Tour, which was announced on 19 March 2017 and implemented in 2018, is a series of elite badminton tournaments sanctioned by the Badminton World Federation (BWF). The BWF World Tour is divided into levels of World Tour Finals, Super 1000, Super 750, Super 500, Super 300, and the BWF Tour Super 100.

Men's doubles
Year	Tournament	Level	Partner	Opponent	Score	Result	Ref.
2018	Singapore Open	Super 500	(Indonesia) Mohammad Ahsan	(China) Ou Xuanyi (China) Ren Xiangyu	21–13, 21–19	(gold) Winner	
2019	Indonesia Masters	Super 500	(Indonesia) Mohammad Ahsan	(Indonesia) Marcus Fernaldi Gideon (Indonesia) Kevin Sanjaya Sukamuljo	17–21, 11–21	(silver) Runner-up	
2019	All England Open	Super 1000	(Indonesia) Mohammad Ahsan	(Malaysia) Aaron Chia (Malaysia) Soh Wooi Yik	11–21, 21–14, 21–12	(gold) Winner	
2019	Singapore Open	Super 500	(Indonesia) Mohammad Ahsan	(Japan) Takeshi Kamura (Japan) Keigo Sonoda	13–21, 21–19, 17–21	(silver) Runner-up	
2019	New Zealand Open	Super 300	(Indonesia) Mohammad Ahsan	(Japan) Hiroyuki Endo (Japan) Yuta Watanabe	20–22, 21–15, 21–17	(gold) Winner	
2019	Indonesia Open	Super 1000	(Indonesia) Mohammad Ahsan	(Indonesia) Marcus Fernaldi Gideon (Indonesia) Kevin Sanjaya Sukamuljo	19–21, 16–21	(silver) Runner-up	
2019	Japan Open	Super 750	(Indonesia) Mohammad Ahsan	(Indonesia) Marcus Fernaldi Gideon (Indonesia) Kevin Sanjaya Sukamuljo	18–21, 21–23	(silver) Runner-up	
2019	China Open	Super 1000	(Indonesia) Mohammad Ahsan	(Indonesia) Marcus Fernaldi Gideon (Indonesia) Kevin Sanjaya Sukamuljo	18–21, 21–17, 15–21	(silver) Runner-up	
2019	Denmark Open	Super 750	(Indonesia) Mohammad Ahsan	(Indonesia) Marcus Fernaldi Gideon (Indonesia) Kevin Sanjaya Sukamuljo	14–21, 13–21	(silver) Runner-up	
2019	Hong Kong Open	Super 500	(Indonesia) Mohammad Ahsan	(South Korea) Choi Sol-gyu (South Korea) Seo Seung-jae	21–13, 12–21, 13–21	(silver) Runner-up	
2019	BWF World Tour Finals	World Tour Finals	(Indonesia) Mohammad Ahsan	(Japan) Hiroyuki Endo (Japan) Yuta Watanabe	24–22, 21–19	(gold) Winner	
2020	Indonesia Masters	Super 500	(Indonesia) Mohammad Ahsan	(Indonesia) Marcus Fernaldi Gideon (Indonesia) Kevin Sanjaya Sukamuljo	15–21, 16–21	(silver) Runner-up	
2020	BWF World Tour Finals	World Tour Finals	(Indonesia) Mohammad Ahsan	(Chinese Taipei) Lee Yang (Chinese Taipei) Wang Chi-lin	17–21, 21–23	(silver) Runner-up	
2022	India Open	Super 500	(Indonesia) Mohammad Ahsan	(India) Satwiksairaj Rankireddy (India) Chirag Shetty	16–21, 24–26	(silver) Runner-up	
2022	All England Open	Super 1000	(Indonesia) Mohammad Ahsan	(Indonesia) Muhammad Shohibul Fikri (Indonesia) Bagas Maulana	19–21, 13–21	(silver) Runner-up	
2022	Malaysia Masters	Super 500	(Indonesia) Mohammad Ahsan	(Indonesia) Fajar Alfian (Indonesia) Muhammad Rian Ardianto	12–21, 19–21	(silver) Runner-up	
2022	BWF World Tour Finals	World Tour Finals	(Indonesia) Mohammad Ahsan	(China) Liu Yuchen (China) Ou Xuanyi	17–21, 21–19, 12–21	(silver) Runner-up	
2023	All England Open	Super 1000	(Indonesia) Mohammad Ahsan	(Indonesia) Fajar Alfian (Indonesia) Muhammad Rian Ardianto	17–21, 14–21	(silver) Runner-up	
2024	Australian Open	Super 500	(Indonesia) Mohammad Ahsan	(China) He Jiting (China) Ren Xiangyu	11–21, 10–21	(silver) Runner-up	

=== BWF Superseries (18 titles, 10 runners-up) ===
The BWF Superseries, which was launched on 14 December 2006 and implemented in 2007, was a series of elite badminton tournaments, sanctioned by the Badminton World Federation (BWF). BWF Superseries levels were Superseries and Superseries Premier. A season of Superseries consisted of twelve tournaments around the world that had been introduced since 2011. Successful players were invited to the Superseries Finals, which were held at the end of each year.

Men's doubles
Year	Tournament	Partner	Opponent	Score	Result	Ref.
2007	China Masters	(Indonesia) Markis Kido	(China) Cai Yun (China) Fu Haifeng	15–21, 16–21	(silver) Runner-up	
2007	China Open	(Indonesia) Markis Kido	(China) Guo Zhendong (China) Xie Zhongbo	21–12, 21–19	(gold) Winner	
2007	Hong Kong Open	(Indonesia) Markis Kido	(United States) Tony Gunawan (Indonesia) Candra Wijaya	21–12, 18–21, 21–13	(gold) Winner	
2008	Malaysia Open	(Indonesia) Markis Kido	(Denmark) Lars Paaske (Denmark) Jonas Rasmussen	21–10, 20–22, 21–18	(gold) Winner	
2008	Swiss Open	(Indonesia) Markis Kido	(South Korea) Jung Jae-sung (South Korea) Lee Yong-dae	21–17, 16–21, 13–21	(silver) Runner-up	
2008	China Masters	(Indonesia) Markis Kido	(China) Sun Junjie (China) Xu Chen	21–17, 24–22	(gold) Winner	
2008	Denmark Open	(Indonesia) Markis Kido	(China) Fu Haifeng (China) Shen Ye	21–18, 21–19	(gold) Winner	
2008	French Open	(Indonesia) Markis Kido	(China) Cai Yun (China) Xu Chen	21–15, 21–12	(gold) Winner	
2009	Singapore Open	(Indonesia) Markis Kido	(England) Anthony Clark (England) Nathan Robertson	12–21, 11–21	(silver) Runner-up	
2009	Japan Open	(Indonesia) Markis Kido	(Indonesia) Yonathan Suryatama Dasuki (Indonesia) Rian Sukmawan	21–19, 24–22	(gold) Winner	
2009	French Open	(Indonesia) Markis Kido	(Malaysia) Koo Kien Keat (Malaysia) Tan Boon Heong	15–21, 21–15, 21–14	(gold) Winner	
2010	Denmark Open	(Indonesia) Markis Kido	(Denmark) Mathias Boe (Denmark) Carsten Mogensen	13–21, 12–21	(silver) Runner-up	
2010	Hong Kong Open	(Indonesia) Markis Kido	(South Korea) Ko Sung-hyun (South Korea) Yoo Yeon-seong	19–21, 21–14, 21–23	(silver) Runner-up	
2012	Singapore Open	(Indonesia) Markis Kido	(South Korea) Ko Sung-hyun (South Korea) Yoo Yeon-seong	22–20, 11–21, 21–6	(gold) Winner	
2013	Malaysia Open	(Indonesia) Mohammad Ahsan	(South Korea) Ko Sung-hyun (South Korea) Lee Yong-dae	21–15, 21–13	(gold) Winner	
2013	Indonesia Open	(Indonesia) Mohammad Ahsan	(South Korea) Ko Sung-hyun (South Korea) Lee Yong-dae	21–14, 21–18	(gold) Winner	
2013	Singapore Open	(Indonesia) Mohammad Ahsan	(South Korea) Ko Sung-hyun (South Korea) Lee Yong-dae	21–15, 21–18	(gold) Winner	
2013	Japan Open	(Indonesia) Mohammad Ahsan	(China) Chai Biao (China) Hong Wei	22–20, 21–16	(gold) Winner	
2013	Denmark Open	(Indonesia) Mohammad Ahsan	(South Korea) Lee Yong-dae (South Korea) Yoo Yeon-seong	19–21, 16–21	(silver) Runner-up	
2013	World Superseries Finals	(Indonesia) Mohammad Ahsan	(South Korea) Kim Gi-jung (South Korea) Kim Sa-rang	21–14, 21–16	(gold) Winner	
2014	All England Open	(Indonesia) Mohammad Ahsan	(Japan) Hiroyuki Endo (Japan) Kenichi Hayakawa	21–19, 21–19	(gold) Winner	
2014	Japan Open	(Indonesia) Mohammad Ahsan	(South Korea) Lee Yong-dae (South Korea) Yoo Yeon-seong	12–21, 24–26	(silver) Runner-up	
2014	Indonesia Open	(Indonesia) Mohammad Ahsan	(South Korea) Lee Yong-dae (South Korea) Yoo Yeon-seong	15–21, 17–21	(silver) Runner-up	
2014	Hong Kong Open	(Indonesia) Mohammad Ahsan	(China) Liu Xiaolong (China) Qiu Zihan	21–16, 16–21, 21–17	(gold) Winner	
2015	Malaysia Open	(Indonesia) Mohammad Ahsan	(South Korea) Lee Yong-dae (South Korea) Yoo Yeon-seong	14–21, 21–15, 23–21	(gold) Winner	
2015	Dubai World Superseries Finals	(Indonesia) Mohammad Ahsan	(China) Chai Biao (China) Hong Wei	13–21, 21–14, 21–14	(gold) Winner	
2017	Australia Open	(Malaysia) Tan Boon Heong	(Japan) Takeshi Kamura (Japan) Keigo Sonoda	17–21, 19–21	(silver) Runner-up	

Mixed doubles
Year	Tournament	Partner	Opponent	Score	Result	Ref.
2010	Indonesia Open	(Russia) Anastasia Russkikh	(Poland) Robert Mateusiak (Poland) Nadieżda Zięba	18–21, 20–22	(silver) Runner-up	

BWF Super Series Finals tournament
BWF Super Series Premier tournament
BWF Super Series tournament

=== BWF Grand Prix (7 titles, 3 runners-up) ===
The BWF Grand Prix had two levels, the Grand Prix and Grand Prix Gold. It was a series of badminton tournaments sanctioned by the Badminton World Federation (BWF) and played between 2007 and 2017. The World Badminton Grand Prix was sanctioned by the International Badminton Federation from 1983 to 2006.

Men's doubles
Year	Tournament	Partner	Opponent	Score	Result	Ref.
2004	Denmark Open	(Indonesia) Markis Kido	(Denmark) Lars Paaske (Denmark) Jonas Rasmussen	6–15, 13–15	(silver) Runner-up	
2005	Indonesia Open	(Indonesia) Markis Kido	(Indonesia) Sigit Budiarto (Indonesia) Candra Wijaya	15–10, 12–15, 15–3	(gold) Winner	
2006	Indonesia Open	(Indonesia) Markis Kido	(United States) Tony Gunawan (Indonesia) Candra Wijaya	11–21, 16–21	(silver) Runner-up	
2006	Hong Kong Open	(Indonesia) Markis Kido	(Malaysia) Choong Tan Fook (Malaysia) Lee Wan Wah	8–21, 21–19, 22–20	(gold) Winner	
2006	China Open	(Indonesia) Markis Kido	(China) Cai Yun (China) Fu Haifeng	21–16, 21–16	(gold) Winner	
2007	Chinese Taipei Open	(Indonesia) Markis Kido	(Denmark) Lars Paaske (Denmark) Jonas Rasmussen	21–17, 21–12	(gold) Winner	
2010	Malaysia Grand Prix Gold	(Indonesia) Markis Kido	(Indonesia) Hendra Aprida Gunawan (Indonesia) Alvent Yulianto	8–21, 21–17, 21–12	(gold) Winner	
2012	Australian Open	(Indonesia) Markis Kido	(Chinese Taipei) Fang Chieh-min (Chinese Taipei) Lee Sheng-mu	21–16, 21–15	(gold) Winner	
2013	Australian Open	(Indonesia) Mohammad Ahsan	(Indonesia) Angga Pratama (Indonesia) Rian Agung Saputro	20–22, 19–21	(silver) Runner-up	
2016	Thailand Masters	(Indonesia) Mohammad Ahsan	(South Korea) Kim Gi-jung (South Korea) Kim Sa-rang	12–21, 21–15, 21–12	(gold) Winner	

BWF Grand Prix Gold tournament
BWF Grand Prix tournament

=== BWF International Challenge/Series/Satellite (1 title, 1 runner-up) ===
Men's doubles
Year	Tournament	Partner	Opponent	Score	Result	Ref.
2002	Singapore Satellite	(Indonesia) Joko Riyadi	(Indonesia) Donny Prasetyo (Indonesia) Denny Setiawan	5–15, 7–15	(silver) Runner-up	
2018	Malaysia International	(Indonesia) Mohammad Ahsan	(Malaysia) Aaron Chia (Malaysia) Soh Wooi Yik	21–17, 17–21, 21–19	(gold) Winner	

BWF International Challenge tournament
BWF International Series tournament

=== Invitational tournament ===
Men's doubles
Year	Tournament	Partner	Opponent	Score	Result	Ref.
2014	Glory to the King	(Indonesia) Mohammad Ahsan	(Thailand) Bodin Isara (Thailand) Pakkawat Vilailak	21–19, 15–21, 21–19	(gold) Winner	

== Performance timeline ==
Key

W	Won	F	Finalist	SF	Semi-finalist
QF	Quarter-finalist	#R	Rounds 4, 3, 2, 1	RR	Round-robin stage
Q#	Qualification round	A	Absent	w/d	Withdrew
G	Gold	S	Silver	B	Bronze
NH	Not held	N/A	Not applicable	DNQ	Did not qualify

=== National team ===
- Junior level

Team events	2001	2002	Ref
Asian Junior Championships	B	G	
World Junior Championships	NH	B	

- Senior level

Team events	2003	2004	2005	2006	2007	2008	2009	2010	2011	2012	2013	2014	2015	2016	2017	2018	2019	2020	2021	2022	Ref
SEA Games	G	NH	S	NH	G	NH	G	NH	G	NH	A	NH	A	NH	A	NH	A	NH	A	NH	
Asia Team Championships	NH													G	NH	G	NH	G	NH	A	
Asian Games	NH			B	NH			B	NH			QF	NH			A	NH			A	
Thomas Cup	NH	A	NH	B	NH	B	NH	S	NH	QF	NH	B	NH	S	NH	B	NH	G	NH	S	
Sudirman Cup	A	NH	A	NH	S	NH	B	NH	A	NH	QF	NH	B	NH	A	NH	B	NH	DNP	NH	

=== Individual competitions ===
==== Junior level ====
===== Boys' doubles =====
Event	2001	Ref
Asian Junior Championships	B	

===== Mixed doubles =====
Event	2001	2002	Ref
Asian Junior Championships	B	B	

==== Senior level ====
===== Men's doubles =====
Events	2003	2004	2005	2006	2007	2008	2009	2010	2011	2012	2013	2014	2015	2016	2017	2018	2019	2020	2021	2022	2023	2024	2025	Ref
SEA Games	QF	NH	G	NH	G	NH	G	NH	S	NH	A	NH	A	NH	A	NH	A	NH	A	NH	A	NH	A	
Asian Championships	S	A	G	A			G	A	QF	A	w/d	A	S	2R	A	2R	2R	NH		2R	QF	A		
Asian Games	NH			B	NH			G	NH			G	NH			A	NH			A	NH			
World Senior Championships	DNE		NH		DNE	NH	DNE	NH	DNE	NH	DNE	NH	DNE	NH	DNE	NH	DNE	NH	A	NH	A	NH	G	
World Cup	NH		A	G	NH																			
World Championships	A	NH	A	QF	G	NH	w/d	B	w/d	NH	G	w/d	G	NH	A		G	NH	w/d	S	QF	NH	DNQ	
Olympic Games	NH	DNQ	NH			G	NH			DNQ	NH			RR	NH			4th	NH			DNQ	NH	

Tournament	IBF Grand Prix							BWF Superseries / Grand Prix											BWF World Tour								Best	Ref
Tournament	2000	2001	2002	2003	2004	2005	2006	2007	2008	2009	2010	2011	2012	2013	2014	2015	2016	2017	2018	2019	2020	2021	2022	2023	2024	2025	Best	Ref
Malaysia Open	A			2R	QF	2R	A	SF	W	SF	A		QF	W	2R	W	QF	1R	2R	QF	NH		QF	QF	2R	A	W ('08, '13, '15)	
India Open	NH								A									2R	SF	A	NH		F	1R	A		F ('22)	
Indonesia Masters	NH										A	2R	A	QF	A	QF	w/d	NH	2R	F	F	2R	2R	2R	A	2R	F ('19, '20)	
Thailand Masters	NH																W	2R	A			NH		A		Ret.	W ('16)	
German Open	A					SF	A						QF	A				1R	SF	A	NH		A			Ret.	SF ('05, '18)	
French Open	A						NH	QF	W	W	SF	2R	2R	w/d	A	SF	1R	1R	2R	2R	NH	QF	1R	QF	1R	Ret.	W ('08, '09)	
All England Open	A					1R	2R	2R	1R	A	SF	QF	2R	SF	W	2R	2R	1R	2R	W	QF	2R	F	F	1R	Ret.	W ('14, '19)	
Swiss Open	A					QF	A		F	A	1R	A	2R	2R	A		w/d	1R	A	QF	NH	A	1R	A		Ret.	F ('08)	
Thailand Open	A		NH	1R	QF	A					NH	A			NH	A		2R	A	1R	QF	NH	QF	A	2R	Ret.	SF ('20)	
Thailand Open	A		NH	1R	QF	A					NH	A			NH	A		2R	A	1R	SF	NH	QF	A	2R	Ret.	SF ('20)	
Malaysia Masters	NH									A	W	2R	A							2R	SF	NH	F	QF	A	Ret.	W ('10)	
Singapore Open	NH	A			2R	2R	1R	SF	w/d	F	SF	2R	W	W	QF	SF	QF	2R	W	F	NH		SF	2R	1R	Ret.	W ('12, '13, '18)	
Indonesia Open	1R	3R	2R	3R	2R	W	F	QF	QF	SF	2R	SF	SF	W	F	SF	2R	2R	1R	F	NH	1R	1R	2R	2R	Ret.	W ('05, '13)	
Australian Open	NH	N/A								A			W	F	w/d	1R	2R	F	A	QF	NH		w/d	2R	F	Ret.	W ('12)	
Canada Open	A								NH		A										NH		A	QF	A	Ret.	QF ('23)	
Japan Open	A					QF	A	SF	QF	W	w/d	SF	A	W	F	QF	SF	2R	2R	F	NH		2R	QF	1R	Ret.	W ('09, '13)	
Korea Open	A					1R	SF	QF	2R	2R	A	2R	2R	1R	A	QF	QF	2R	A	w/d	NH		SF	w/d	A	Ret.	SF ('06, '22)	
Chinese Taipei Open	A	NH	A					W	A			QF	A			SF	A				NH		A			Ret.	W ('07)	
Hong Kong Open	NH	A	NH	A	NH	2R	W	W	QF	QF	F	A	QF	SF	W	SF	1R	2R	SF	F	NH			SF	1R	Ret.	W ('06, '07, '14)	
China Open	NH	A		1R	2R	1R	W	W	A	2R	w/d	QF	A	1R	1R	2R	1R	1R	2R	F	NH			1R	1R	Ret.	W ('06, '07)	
Macau Open	NH		N/A	NH			A	SF	A		SF	QF	A								NH			N/A	A	Ret.	SF ('07, '10)	
Arctic Open	NH		N/A									NH	N/A								NH			SF	2R	Ret.	SF ('23)	
Denmark Open	A				F	A		SF	W	SF	F	SF	SF	F	QF	2R	2R	2R	SF	F	A	1R	2R	2R	1R	Ret.	W ('08)	
Hylo Open	A																					QF	A			Ret.	QF ('21)	
Japan Masters	NH																							1R	A	Ret.	1R ('23)	
China Masters	NH					A		F	W	A		2R	A					SF	SF	QF	NH			2R	1R	Ret.	W ('08)	
Syed Modi International	NH									A				NH	A			QF	A		NH		A			Ret.	QF ('17)	
Superseries / World Tour Finals	NH								SF	A	RR	DNQ		W	RR	W	DNQ		RR	W	F	DNQ	F	DNQ		Ret.	W ('13, '15, '19)	
New Zealand Open	N/A	NH	N/A			A					NH	N/A	NH	A						W	NH			N/A		Ret.	W ('19)	
Year-end ranking							5		1	3	3	11	13	1	4	2	11	20	9	2	2	2	3	13	34	319	1	
Tournament	2000	2001	2002	2003	2004	2005	2006	2007	2008	2009	2010	2011	2012	2013	2014	2015	2016	2017	2018	2019	2020	2021	2022	2023	2024	2025	Best	Ref

===== Mixed doubles =====
Events	2025	Ref
World Senior Championships	G	

Tournament	BWF Superseries / Grand Prix			Best	Ref
Tournament	2010	2011	2012	Best	Ref
Swiss Open	A		1R	1R ('12)	
German Open	A		2R	2R ('12)	
All England Open	A	SF	2R	SF ('12)	
Australian Open	A		1R	1R ('12)	
Singapore Open	Q1	A	QF	QF ('12)	
Korea Open	A	1R	A	1R ('11)	
Denmark Open	1R	A		1R ('10)	
French Open	QF	A		QF ('10)	
Indonesia Open	F	A	2R	F ('10)	
Year-end ranking	65	103	53	34	
Tournament	2010	2011	2012	Best	Ref

== Record against selected opponents ==
Men's doubles results against Year-end Finals finalists, World Championships semi-finalists, and Olympic quarter-finalists paired with:

=== Mohammad Ahsan ===
Players	M	W	L	Diff.
(China) Cai Yun & Fu Haifeng	5	4	1	+3
(China) Chai Biao & Hong Wei	4	2	2	0
(China) Fu Haifeng & Zhang Nan	8	3	5	–2
(China) He Jiting & Tan Qiang	2	1	1	0
(China) Liang Weikeng & Wang Chang	6	2	4	–2
(China) Li Junhui & Liu Yuchen	14	6	9	–3
(China) Liu Cheng & Zhang Nan	2	2	0	+2
(China) Liu Xiaolong & Qiu Zihan	5	3	2	+1
(China) Liu Yuchen & Ou Xuanyi	5	1	4	–3
(Chinese Taipei) Chen Hung-ling & Wang Chi-lin	4	2	2	0
(Chinese Taipei) Lee Sheng-mu & Tsai Chia-hsin	8	7	1	+6
(Chinese Taipei) Lee Yang & Wang Chi-lin	12	6	6	0
(Denmark) Kim Astrup & Anders Skaarup Rasmussen	12	7	5	+2
(Denmark) Mathias Boe & Carsten Mogensen	6	5	1	+4
(England) Marcus Ellis & Chris Langridge	5	5	0	+5
(India) Satwiksairaj Rankireddy & Chirag Shetty	8	4	4	0
(Indonesia) Fajar Alfian & Muhammad Rian Ardianto	7	3	4	–1
(Indonesia) Marcus Fernaldi Gideon & Kevin Sanjaya Sukamuljo	13	2	11	–9
(Japan) Hiroyuki Endo & Kenichi Hayakawa	10	9	1	+8
(Japan) Hiroyuki Endo & Yuta Watanabe	8	6	2	+4
(Japan) Takuro Hoki & Yugo Kobayashi	6	3	3	0
(Japan) Takeshi Kamura & Keigo Sonoda	8	6	2	+4
(Malaysia) Mohd Zakry Abdul Latif & Mohd Fairuzizuan Tazari	1	1	0	+1
(Malaysia) Aaron Chia & Soh Wooi Yik	13	8	5	+3
(Malaysia) Goh V Shem & Tan Wee Kiong	8	7	1	+6
(Malaysia) Koo Kien Keat & Tan Boon Heong	3	1	2	–1
(Malaysia) Ong Yew Sin & Teo Ee Yi	4	3	1	+2
(Russia) Vladimir Ivanov & Ivan Sozonov	6	6	0	+6
(South Korea) Kang Min-hyuk & Seo Seung-jae	7	2	5	–3
(South Korea) Kim Gi-jung & Kim Sa-rang	9	7	2	+5
(South Korea) Ko Sung-hyun & Lee Yong-dae	3	3	0	+3
(South Korea) Ko Sung-hyun & Shin Baek-cheol	6	3	3	0
(South Korea) Lee Yong-dae & Yoo Yeon-seong	13	6	7	–1
(Thailand) Bodin Isara & Maneepong Jongjit	1	1	0	+1

=== Markis Kido ===
Players	M	W	L	Diff.
(China) Cai Yun & Fu Haifeng	10	4	6	–2 (Note: The head-to-head record between Setiawan and Kido against Cai and Fu is actually 4–6. Tournament software did not included 2006 China Open results for head-to-head.)
(China) Chai Biao & Guo Zhendong	2	1	1	0
(China) Guo Zhendong & Xu Chen	2	2	0	+2
(Chinese Taipei) Fang Chieh-min & Lee Sheng-mu	11	7	4	+3
(Denmark) Mathias Boe & Carsten Mogensen	7	2	5	–3
(Denmark) Jens Eriksen & Martin Lundgaard Hansen	6	5	1	+4 (Note: The head-to-head record between Setiawan and Kido against Eriksen and Lundgaard Hansen is actually 5–1. Tournament software did not included 2006 China Open results for head-to-head.)
(Denmark) Lars Paaske & Jonas Rasmussen	11	6	5	+1
(England) Robert Blair & Anthony Clark	2	0	2	–2
(Indonesia) Mohammad Ahsan & Bona Septano	2	1	1	0
(Indonesia) Sigit Budiarto & Candra Wijaya	1	1	0	+1
(Indonesia) Luluk Hadiyanto & Alvent Yulianto	5	2	3	–1
(Indonesia) Eng Hian & Flandy Limpele	3	1	2	–1
(Japan) Hiroyuki Endo & Kenichi Hayakawa	4	3	1	+2
(Japan) Shintaro Ikeda & Shuichi Sakamoto	1	1	0	+1
(Japan) Keita Masuda & Tadashi Ōtsuka	6	5	1	+4
(Malaysia) Mohd Zakry Abdul Latif & Mohd Fairuzizuan Tazari	7	7	0	+7
(Malaysia) Chan Chong Ming & Chew Choon Eng	1	1	0	+1
(Malaysia) Chan Chong Ming & Koo Kien Keat	1	1	0	+1
(Malaysia) Choong Tan Fook & Lee Wan Wah	8	6	2	+4
(Malaysia) Koo Kien Keat & Tan Boon Heong	11	4	7	–3
(Poland) Michał Łogosz & Robert Mateusiak	3	3	0	+3
(South Korea) Ha Tae-kwon & Kim Dong-moon	1	0	1	–1
(South Korea) Hwang Ji-man & Lee Jae-jin	1	1	0	+1
(South Korea) Jung Jae-sung & Lee Yong-dae	13	5	8	–3
(South Korea) Kim Gi-jung & Kim Sa-rang	1	0	1	–1
(South Korea) Ko Sung-hyun & Yoo Yeon-seong	5	3	2	+1
(United States) Howard Bach & Tony Gunawan	3	2	1	+1
(United States) Howard Bach & Bob Malaythong	1	1	0	+1
(United States) Tony Gunawan & (Indonesia) Candra Wijaya	8	5	3	+2
