= 2008 Uber Cup knockout stage =

This article lists the complete results of the knockout stage of the 2008 Uber Cup in Jakarta, Indonesia.

== Group results ==
The winners of each group were exempted until the quarter-finals stage while the rest of the teams competed in the round of 16 for a place in the final eight.

Group	Winners	Runners-up	Third place
W	China	Germany	United States
X	South Korea	Hong Kong	South Africa
Y	Denmark	Malaysia	New Zealand
Z	Indonesia	Netherlands	Japan

== Bracket ==
Round of 16
China
Bye
New Zealand	0
Netherlands	3
South Korea
Bye
Malaysia	3
Japan	0
Germany	3
South Africa	0
Bye
Denmark
Hong Kong	3
United States	0
Bye
Indonesia

Quarter-finals
China	3
Netherlands	2
South Korea	3
Malaysia	1
Germany	3
Denmark	0
Hong Kong	0
Indonesia	3

Semi-finals
China	3
South Korea	1
Germany	1
Indonesia	3

Final
China	3
Indonesia	0

== Round of 16 ==
=== New Zealand vs Netherlands ===
New Zealand
0
Istora Gelora Bung Karno, Court 3
13 May 2008, 13:00 UTC+7

Netherlands
3

			1	2	3
1	(New Zealand) (Netherlands)	Rachel Hindley; Yao Jie	10; 21	12; 21
2	(New Zealand) (Netherlands)	Michelle Chan; Judith Meulendijks	19; 21	10; 21
3	(New Zealand) (Netherlands)	Jessica Jonggowisastro; Karina de Wit	18; 21	15; 21
4	(New Zealand) (Netherlands)	Renee Flavell / Rachel Hindley; Rachel van Cutsen / Paulien van Dooremalen				not played
5	(New Zealand) (Netherlands)	Donna Cranston / Emma Rodgers; Karina de Wit / Judith Meulendijks				not played

=== Malaysia vs Japan ===
Malaysia
3
Istora Gelora Bung Karno, Court 2
13 May 2008, 13:00 UTC+7

Japan
0

			1	2	3
1	(Malaysia) (Japan)	Wong Mew Choo; Eriko Hirose	21; 17	21; 18
2	(Malaysia) (Japan)	Lim Pek Siah / Wong Pei Tty; Miyuki Maeda / Satoko Suetsuna	21; 15	21; 18
3	(Malaysia) (Japan)	Julia Wong Pei Xian; Yu Hirayama	21; 15	10; 21	21; 19
4	(Malaysia) (Japan)	Chin Eei Hui / Ng Hui Lin; Mami Naito / Reiko Shiota				not played
5	(Malaysia) (Japan)	Lydia Cheah Li Ya; Kaori Imabeppu				not played

=== Germany vs South Africa ===
Germany
3
Istora Gelora Bung Karno, Court 3
13 May 2008, 18:00 UTC+7

South Africa
0

			1	2	3
1	(Germany) (South Africa)	Xu Huaiwen; Kerry-Lee Harrington	21; 10	21; 8
2	(Germany) (South Africa)	Carola Bott; Stacey Doubell	21; 9	21; 11
3	(Germany) (South Africa)	Karin Schnaase; Annari Viljoen	21; 7	21; 6
4	(Germany) (South Africa)	Kathrin Piotrowski / Birgit Overzier; Chantal Botts / Michelle Edwards				not played
5	(Germany) (South Africa)	Michaela Peiffer / Karin Schnaase; Jade Morgan / Annari Viljoen				not played

=== Hong Kong vs United States ===
Hong Kong
3
Istora Gelora Bung Karno, Court 4
13 May 2008, 18:00 UTC+7

United States
0

			1	2	3
1	(Hong Kong) (United States)	Yip Pui Yin; Eva Lee	21; 11	21; 9
2	(Hong Kong) (United States)	Mong Kwan Yi; Lauren Todt	21; 14	21; 10
3	(Hong Kong) (United States)	Chau Hoi Wah / Koon Wai Chee; Eva Lee / Mesinee Mangkalakiri	21; 19	21; 15
4	(Hong Kong) (United States)	Chan Tsz Ka; Rena Wang				not played
5	(Hong Kong) (United States)	Mong Kwan Yi / Yip Pui Yin; Panita Phongasavithas / Vimla Phongasavithas				not played

== Quarter-finals ==
=== Denmark vs Germany ===
Denmark
0
Istora Gelora Bung Karno, Court 1
14 May 2008, 13:00 UTC+7

Germany
3

			1	2	3
1	(Denmark) (Germany)	Tine Rasmussen; Xu Huaiwen	19; 21	21; 19	19; 21
2	(Denmark) (Germany)	Nanna Brosolat Jensen; Juliane Schenk	15; 21	9; 21
3	(Denmark) (Germany)	Mie Schjøtt-Kristensen / Christinna Pedersen; Birgit Overzier / Xu Huaiwen	19; 21	21; 16	16; 21
4	(Denmark) (Germany)	Camilla Sørensen; Karin Schnaase				not played
5	(Denmark) (Germany)	Kamilla Rytter Juhl / Marie Røpke; Kathrin Piotrowski / Juliane Schenk				not played

=== Indonesia vs Hong Kong ===
Indonesia
3
Istora Gelora Bung Karno, Court 2
14 May 2008, 13:00 UTC+7

Hong Kong
0

			1	2	3
1	(Indonesia) (Hong Kong)	Maria Kristin Yulianti; Yip Pui Yin	21; 19	21; 19
2	(Indonesia) (Hong Kong)	Vita Marissa / Liliyana Natsir; Chau Hoi Wah / Koon Wai Chee	21; 14	21; 4
3	(Indonesia) (Hong Kong)	Adriyanti Firdasari; Mong Kwan Yi	21; 7	21; 9
4	(Indonesia) (Hong Kong)	Jo Novita / Greysia Polii; Chan Tsz Ka / Tse Ying Suet				not played
5	(Indonesia) (Hong Kong)	Pia Zebadiah; Ng Ka Shun				not played

=== China vs Netherlands ===
China
3
Istora Gelora Bung Karno, Court 1
14 May 2008, 18:00 UTC+7

Netherlands
2

			1	2	3
1	(China) (Netherlands)	Xie Xingfang; Yao Jie	21; 14	12; 21	16; 21
2	(China) (Netherlands)	Lu Lan; Judith Meulendijks	10; 21	21; 18	22; 20
3	(China) (Netherlands)	Jiang Yanjiao; Rachel van Cutsen	10; 21	21; 11	16; 21
4	(China) (Netherlands)	Yang Wei / Zhang Jiewen; Judith Meulendijks / Paulien van Dooremalen	21; 9	21; 9
5	(China) (Netherlands)	Wei Yili / Zhang Yawen; Karina de Wit / Rachel van Cutsen	21; 10	21; 7

=== South Korea vs Malaysia ===
South Korea
3
Istora Gelora Bung Karno, Court 4
14 May 2008, 18:00 UTC+7

Malaysia
1

			1	2	3
1	(South Korea) (Malaysia)	Hwang Hye-youn; Wong Mew Choo	16; 21	5; 21
2	(South Korea) (Malaysia)	Lee Hyo-jung / Kim Min-jung; Lim Pek Siah / Wong Pei Tty	21; 13	21; 4
3	(South Korea) (Malaysia)	Lee Yun-hwa; Julia Wong Pei Xian	21; 14	21; 13
4	(South Korea) (Malaysia)	Ha Jung-eun / Lee Kyung-won; Chin Eei Hui / Ng Hui Lin	17; 21	21; 16	21; 12
5	(South Korea) (Malaysia)	Bae Yeon-ju; Lydia Cheah Li Ya				not played

== Semi-finals ==
=== China vs South Korea ===
China
3
Istora Gelora Bung Karno, Court 1
15 May 2008, 13:00 UTC+7

South Korea
1

			1	2	3
1	(China) (South Korea)	Xie Xingfang; Hwang Hye-youn	21; 9	21; 19
2	(China) (South Korea)	Yang Wei / Zhang Jiewen; Lee Hyo-jung / Lee Kyung-won	21; 14	17; 21	18; 21
3	(China) (South Korea)	Lu Lan; Jang Soo-young	21; 9	21; 12
4	(China) (South Korea)	Wei Yili / Zhang Yawen; Ha Jung-eun / Kim Min-jung	21; 19	21; 8
5	(China) (South Korea)	Zhu Lin; Bae Yeon-ju				not played

=== Germany vs Indonesia ===
Germany
1
Istora Gelora Bung Karno, Court 1
15 May 2008, 18:00 UTC+7

Indonesia
3

			1	2	3
1	(Germany) (Indonesia)	Xu Huaiwen; Maria Kristin Yulianti	22; 20	21; 15
2	(Germany) (Indonesia)	Juliane Schenk; Adriyanti Firdasari	16; 21	20; 22
3	(Germany) (Indonesia)	Birgit Overzier / Kathrin Piotrowski; Jo Novita / Greysia Polii	9; 21	13; 21
4	(Germany) (Indonesia)	Karin Schnaase; Pia Zebadiah	7; 21	16; 21
5	(Germany) (Indonesia)	Michaela Peiffer / Juliane Schenk; Vita Marissa / Liliyana Natsir				not played

== Final ==
=== China vs Indonesia ===
China
3
Istora Gelora Bung Karno, Court 1
17 May 2008, 18:00 UTC+7

Indonesia
0

			1	2	3
1	(China) (Indonesia)	Xie Xingfang; Maria Kristin Yulianti	21; 8	21; 15
2	(China) (Indonesia)	Yang Wei / Zhang Jiewen; Vita Marissa / Liliyana Natsir	21; 15	19; 21	21; 16
3	(China) (Indonesia)	Lu Lan; Adriyanti Firdasari	21; 12	21; 10
4	(China) (Indonesia)	Wei Yili / Zhang Yawen; Jo Novita / Greysia Polii				not played
5	(China) (Indonesia)	Zhu Lin; Pia Zebadiah				not played
