= 2007 BWF World Championships – Men's doubles =

Men's doubles at the 2007 BWF World Championships
- Venue: Putra Indoor Stadium
- Location: Kuala Lumpur, Malaysia
- Dates: August 13, 2007 – August 19, 2007

Medalists
gold medal	Markis Kido; Hendra Setiawan	Indonesia
silver medal	Jung Jae-sung; Lee Yong-dae	South Korea
bronze medal	Choong Tan Fook; Lee Wan Wah	Malaysia
bronze medal	Shintaro Ikeda; Shuichi Sakamoto	Japan

This article list the results of men's doubles category in the 2007 BWF World Championships (World Badminton Championships).

== Seeds ==
1. (China) Cai Yun / Fu Haifeng (quarter-finals)
2. (Malaysia) Koo Kien Keat / Tan Boon Heong (quarter-finals)
3. (Indonesia) Markis Kido / Hendra Setiawan (world champions)
4. (Denmark) Jens Eriksen / Martin Lundgaard Hansen (quarter-finals)
5. (Indonesia) Candra Wijaya / (United States) Tony Gunawan (quarter-finals)
6. (Malaysia) Choong Tan Fook / Lee Wan Wah (semi-finals)
7. (Malaysia) Mohd Zakry Abdul Latif / Mohd Fairuzizuan Mohd Tazari (second round)
8. (Indonesia) Luluk Hadiyanto / Alvent Yulianto (third round)

9. (England) Robert Blair / Anthony Clark (second round)
10. (South Korea) Hwang Ji-man / Lee Jae-jin (third round)
11. (Denmark) Lars Paaske / Jonas Rasmussen (second round)
12. (Hong Kong) Albertus Susanto Njoto / Yohan Hadikusumo Wiratama (second round)
13. (South Korea) Jung Jae-sung / Lee Yong-dae (final)
14. (Indonesia) Hendra Aprida Gunawan / Joko Riyadi (third round)
15. (Malaysia) Ong Soon Hock / Tan Bin Shen (first round)
16. (Japan) Shintaro Ikeda / Shuichi Sakamoto (semi-finals)

== Draw ==
=== Finals ===
Semi-finals
6	(Malaysia) Choong Tan Fook (Malaysia) Lee Wan Wah	20	26
3	(Indonesia) Markis Kido (Indonesia) Hendra Setiawan	22	28
13	(South Korea) Jung Jae-sung (South Korea) Lee Yong-dae	21	21
16	(Japan) Shintaro Ikeda (Japan) Shuichi Sakamoto	16	12

Final
3	(Indonesia) Markis Kido (Indonesia) Hendra Setiawan	21	21
13	(South Korea) Jung Jae-sung (South Korea) Lee Yong-dae	19	19

=== Top half ===
==== Section 1 ====
First Round
11	(Denmark) L Paaske (Denmark) J Rasmussen	w	/	o
(Brazil) L Araújo (Brazil) P von Scala
(Russia) V Durkin (Russia) A Nikolaenko	21	21
(Sri Lanka) Dil Karunaratne (Sri Lanka) Din Karunaratne	11	7
(Italy) L Izzo (Italy) G Traina	17	16
(Belgium) W Claes (Belgium) F Mawet	21	21
12	(Hong Kong) A S Njoto (Hong Kong) Y H Wiratama	21	13	21
(England) R Adcock (England) R Middleton	14	21	10
(Denmark) A Kristiansen (Denmark) S Mollyhus	21	21
(Germany) K Hopp (Germany) I Kindervater	19	19

Second Round
1	(China) Cai Y (China) Fu HF	21	21
(Bulgaria) S Makarski (Bulgaria) V Metodiev	12	10
11	(Denmark) L Paaske (Denmark) J Rasmussen	29	18
(Russia) V Durkin (Russia) A Nikolaenko	30	21
6	(Malaysia) Choong T F (Malaysia) Lee W W	w	/	o
(Belgium) W Claes (Belgium) F Mawet
12	(Hong Kong) A S Njoto (Hong Kong) Y H Wiratama	22	19	17
(Denmark) A Kristiansen (Denmark) S Mollyhus	20	21	21

Third Round
1	(China) Cai Y (China) Fu HF	21	21
(Russia) V Durkin (Russia) A Nikolaenko	10	9
6	(Malaysia) Choong T F (Malaysia) Lee W W	21	15	21
(Denmark) A Kristiansen (Denmark) S Mollyhus	11	21	16

Quarter-finals
1	(China) Cai Y (China) Fu HF	21	18	19
6	' (Malaysia) Choong T F (Malaysia) Lee W W	15	21	21

==== Section 2 ====
First Round
15	(Malaysia) Ong S H (Malaysia) Tan B S	14	8
(Japan) K Masuda (Japan) T Ōtsuka	21	21
(Kenya) H Patel (Kenya) P Ruto	5	13
(United States) H Bach (United States) B Malaythong	21	21
(Australia) R Smith (Australia) G Warfe	21	21
(Belarus) A Konakh (Russia) A Russkikh	9	11
10	(South Korea) Hwang J-m (South Korea) Lee J-j	21	21
(Canada) K Holoboff (Canada) R Liang	10	8
(Philippines) A Amahit Jr. (Philippines) L Escoses	11	16
(England) D Lindley (England) C Langridge	21	21

Second Round
3	(Indonesia) M Kido (Indonesia) H Setiawan	21	21
(Slovenia) M Horvat (Slovenia) A Murn	8	12
(Japan) K Masuda (Japan) T Ōtsuka	21	21
(United States) H Bach (United States) B Malaythong	15	13
5	(Indonesia) C Wijaya (United States) T Gunawan	22	21
(Australia) R Smith (Australia) G Warfe	20	9
10	(South Korea) Hwang J-m (South Korea) Lee J-j	21	21
(England) D Lindley (England) C Langridge	19	18

Third Round
3	(Indonesia) M Kido (Indonesia) H Setiawan	22	21
(Japan) K Masuda (Japan) T Ōtsuka	20	19
5	(Indonesia) C Wijaya (United States) T Gunawan	21	21
10	(South Korea) Hwang J-m (South Korea) Lee J-j	17	16

Quarter-finals
3	(Indonesia) M Kido (Indonesia) H Setiawan	21	21
5	(Indonesia) C Wijaya (United States) T Gunawan	12	19

=== Bottom half ===
==== Section 3 ====
First Round
(India) R Kumar K. T. (India) S Thomas	21	21
(France) M Popov (France) S Stoyanov	9	15
(Brazil) G Kumasaka (Brazil) G Pardo
14	(Indonesia) H A Gunawan (Indonesia) J Riyadi	w	/	o
(Chinese Taipei) Chien Y-h (Chinese Taipei) Lin Y-l	23	18
(China) Guo ZD (China) Xie ZB	25	21
(New Zealand) C Cooper (New Zealand) D Shirley	21	19	21
(Canada) M Beres (Canada) W Milroy	13	21	23
(Singapore) H Saputra (Singapore) H Wijaya	13	13
13	(South Korea) Jung J-s (South Korea) Lee Y-d	21	21

Second Round
(India) R Kumar K. T. (India) S Thomas	13	14
14	(Indonesia) H A Gunawan (Indonesia) J Riyadi	21	21
(China) Guo ZD (China) Xie ZB	21	21
7	(Malaysia) M Z Abdul Latif (Malaysia) M F Mohd Tazari	14	13
(Canada) M Beres (Canada) W Milroy	15	8
13	(South Korea) Jung J-s (South Korea) Lee Y-d	21	21
(South Africa) R Dednam (South Africa) C Dednam	12	15
4	(Denmark) J Eriksen (Denmark) M Lundgaard Hansen	21	21

Third Round
14	(Indonesia) H A Gunawan (Indonesia) J Riyadi	20	21	16
(China) Guo ZD (China) Xie ZB	22	16	21
13	(South Korea) Jung J-s (South Korea) Lee Y-d	21	21
4	(Denmark) J Eriksen (Denmark) M Lundgaard Hansen	17	15

Quarter-finals
(China) Guo ZD (China) Xie ZB	26	17	7
13	(South Korea) Jung J-s (South Korea) Lee Y-d	24	21	21

==== Section 4 ====
First Round
(Mongolia) B Ochirpurev (Mongolia) E Olonbayer
(Hong Kong) Hui W H (Hong Kong) A T Putra	w	/	o
(Netherlands) R Bosch (Netherlands) K Ridder	14	14
16	(Japan) S Ikeda (Japan) S Sakamoto	21	21
(Japan) K Kawaguchi (Japan) N Kawamae	w	/	o
(Bulgaria) G Petrov (Bulgaria) B Kisyov
(Poland) M Łogosz (Poland) R Mateusiak	21	21
(Guatemala) E Anguiano (Guatemala) P Yang	16	14
(Switzerland) M Andrey (Switzerland) C Bösiger	11	9
9	(England) R Blair (England) A Clark	21	21

Second Round
(Hong Kong) Hui W H (Hong Kong) A T Putra	14	20
16	(Japan) S Ikeda (Japan) S Sakamoto	21	22
(Japan) K Kawaguchi (Japan) N Kawamae	10	14
8	(Indonesia) L Hadiyanto (Indonesia) A Yulianto	21	21
(Poland) M Łogosz (Poland) R Mateusiak	21	21
9	(England) R Blair (England) A Clark	16	16
(Germany) M Fuchs (Germany) R Spitko	12	13
2	(Malaysia) Koo K K (Malaysia) Tan B H	21	21

Third Round
16	(Japan) S Ikeda (Japan) S Sakamoto	21	22	21
(Indonesia) L Hadiyanto (Indonesia) A Yulianto	19	24	15
(Poland) M Łogosz (Poland) R Mateusiak	17	19
2	(Malaysia) Koo K K (Malaysia) Tan B H	21	21

Quarter-finals
16	(Japan) S Ikeda (Japan) S Sakamoto	21	17	25
2	(Malaysia) Koo K K (Malaysia) Tan B H	13	21	23

== Source ==
- Tournamentsoftware.com: 2007 World Championships - Men's doubles
