= 2008 Thomas & Uber Cup =

2008 Thomas & Uber Cup Piala Thomas & Uber 2008

Tournament details
- Dates: 11–18 May
- Edition: 25th (Thomas Cup); 22nd (Uber Cup)
- Level: International
- Venue: Istora Gelora Bung Karno
- Location: Jakarta, Indonesia

The 2008 Thomas & Uber Cup was the 25th tournament of the Thomas Cup and 22nd tournament of the Uber Cup, the men's and women's team competition in badminton, respectively. It was held in Jakarta, Indonesia, from May 11 to May 18, 2008.

== Host city selection ==
China, Indonesia, and the United States submitted a bid for the event. International Badminton Federation selected Indonesia as the host for the event during a council meeting in December 2005.

== Qualification ==
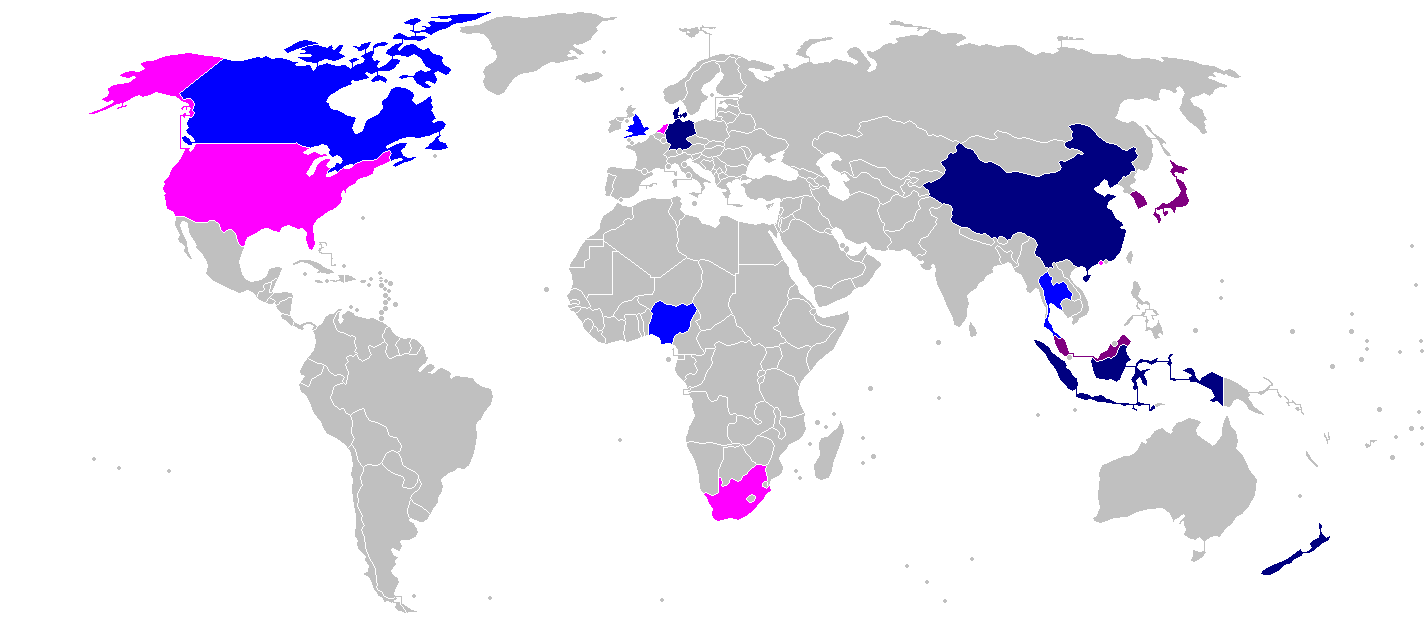
Qualifying countries

Confederation	Qualifier(s)	
Confederation	Thomas Cup	Uber Cup
Asia	Malaysia; Thailand; Japan; South Korea	South Korea; Japan; Malaysia; Hong Kong
Africa	Nigeria	South Africa
Europe	Denmark; England; Germany	Denmark; Netherlands; Germany
Oceania	New Zealand	New Zealand
Americas	Canada	United States
Defending Champions	China	China
Host nation	Indonesia	Indonesia

== Seedings ==
All the seeding list based on February 28, 2008 world rankings as the draw was conducted on March 11, 2008. The top four seeding teams is in first pot, follow by next four teams in the second pot and the bottom four teams was put in the third pot.

Thomas Cup

1. China
2. Indonesia
3. Malaysia
4. Denmark
5. South Korea
6. Japan
7. Canada
8. Germany
9. Thailand
10. England
11. New Zealand
12. Nigeria

Uber Cup

1. China
2. Japan
3. South Korea
4. Malaysia
5. Indonesia
6. Germany
7. Denmark
8. Hong Kong
9. Netherlands
10. New Zealand
11. United States
12. South Africa

== Medal summary ==
=== Medalists ===
Event	Gold	Silver	Bronze
Thomas Cup	China; Lin Dan; Bao Chunlai; Chen Jin; Chen Yu; Cai Yun; Fu Haifeng; Xie Zhongbo; Guo Zhendong; He Hanbin; Shen Ye	South Korea; Park Sung-hwan; Lee Hyun-il; Shon Seung-mo; Hong Ji-hoon; Lee Jae-jin; Jung Jae-sung; Hwang Ji-man; Lee Yong-dae	Malaysia; Lee Chong Wei; Wong Choong Hann; Muhammad Hafiz Hashim; Mohd Arif Abdul Latif; Choong Tan Fook; Lee Wan Wah; Koo Kien Keat; Tan Boon Heong; Mohd Fairuzizuan Mohd Tazari; Mohd Zakry Abdul Latif
Thomas Cup	China; Lin Dan; Bao Chunlai; Chen Jin; Chen Yu; Cai Yun; Fu Haifeng; Xie Zhongbo; Guo Zhendong; He Hanbin; Shen Ye	South Korea; Park Sung-hwan; Lee Hyun-il; Shon Seung-mo; Hong Ji-hoon; Lee Jae-jin; Jung Jae-sung; Hwang Ji-man; Lee Yong-dae	Indonesia; Sony Dwi Kuncoro; Taufik Hidayat; Simon Santoso; Tommy Sugiarto; Markis Kido; Hendra Setiawan; Joko Riyadi; Hendra Aprida Gunawan; Candra Wijaya; Nova Widianto
Uber Cup	China; Xie Xingfang; Lu Lan; Zhu Lin; Jiang Yanjiao; Yang Wei; Zhang Jiewen; Wei Yili; Zhang Yawen; Gao Ling; Zhao Tingting	Indonesia; Maria Kristin Yulianti; Adriyanti Firdasari; Pia Zebadiah; Fransisca Ratnasari; Lilyana Natsir; Vita Marissa; Greysia Polii; Jo Novita; Rani Mundiasti; Endang Nursugianti	South Korea; Hwang Hye-youn; Lee Yun-hwa; Jang Soo-young; Bae Youn-joo; Lee Kyung-won; Lee Hyo-jung; Kim Min-jung; Ha Jung-eun
Uber Cup	China; Xie Xingfang; Lu Lan; Zhu Lin; Jiang Yanjiao; Yang Wei; Zhang Jiewen; Wei Yili; Zhang Yawen; Gao Ling; Zhao Tingting	Indonesia; Maria Kristin Yulianti; Adriyanti Firdasari; Pia Zebadiah; Fransisca Ratnasari; Lilyana Natsir; Vita Marissa; Greysia Polii; Jo Novita; Rani Mundiasti; Endang Nursugianti	Germany; Xu Huaiwen; Juliane Schenk; Janet Köhler; Carola Bott; Karin Schnaase; Nicole Grether; Carina Mette; Birgit Overzier; Michaela Peiffer; Kathrin Piotrowski

=== Medal table ===
* Host nation (Indonesia)

Rank	Nation	Gold	Silver	Bronze	Total
1	China	2	0	0	2
2	Indonesia*	0	1	1	2
2	South Korea	0	1	1	2
4	Germany	0	0	1	1
4	Malaysia	0	0	1	1
Totals (5 entries)		2	2	4	8

== Thomas Cup ==
=== Group stage ===
==== Group A ====
Pos	Team	Pld	W	L	GF	GA	GD	PF	PA	PD	Pts	Qualification
1	China	2	2	0	20	0	+20	420	180	+240	2	Quarter-finals
2	Canada	2	1	1	10	10	0	322	347	−25	1	Round of 16
3	Nigeria	2	0	2	0	20	−20	205	420	−215	0	Round of 16

Source: BadmintonCN

11 May 2008
08:00 UTC+7

China	5–0	Nigeria
Report

Istora Gelora Bung Karno Court 2, Jakarta

11 May 2008
18:00 UTC+7

Canada	5–0	Nigeria
Report

Istora Gelora Bung Karno Court 1, Jakarta

12 May 2008
13:00 UTC+7

China	5–0	Canada
Report

Istora Gelora Bung Karno Court 1, Jakarta

==== Group B ====
Pos	Team	Pld	W	L	GF	GA	GD	PF	PA	PD	Pts	Qualification
1	Malaysia	2	2	0	19	2	+17	429	326	+103	2	Quarter-finals
2	England	2	1	1	8	13	−5	376	396	−20	1	Round of 16
3	South Korea	2	0	2	5	17	−12	355	438	−83	0	Round of 16

Source: BadmintonCN

11 May 2008
13:00 UTC+7

Malaysia	5–0	England
Report

Istora Gelora Bung Karno Court 3, Jakarta

12 May 2008
08:00 UTC+7

South Korea	1–4	England
Report

Istora Gelora Bung Karno Court 3, Jakarta

12 May 2008
18:00 UTC+7

Malaysia	4–1	South Korea
Report

Istora Gelora Bung Karno Court 4, Jakarta

==== Group C ====
Pos	Team	Pld	W	L	GF	GA	GD	PF	PA	PD	Pts	Qualification
1	Denmark	2	2	0	18	4	+14	448	315	+133	2	Quarter-finals
2	Japan	2	1	1	14	8	+6	434	359	+75	1	Round of 16
3	New Zealand	2	0	2	0	20	−20	212	420	−208	0	Round of 16

Source: BadmintonCN

11 May 2008
13:00 UTC+7

Denmark	5–0	New Zealand
Report

Istora Gelora Bung Karno Court 1, Jakarta

12 May 2008
08:00 UTC+7

Japan	5–0	New Zealand
Report

Istora Gelora Bung Karno Court 1, Jakarta

12 May 2008
18:00 UTC+7

Denmark	3–2	Japan
Report

Istora Gelora Bung Karno Court 3, Jakarta

==== Group D ====
Pos	Team	Pld	W	L	GF	GA	GD	PF	PA	PD	Pts	Qualification
1	Indonesia (H)	2	2	0	16	6	+10	442	320	+122	2	Quarter-finals
2	Thailand	2	1	1	12	10	+2	395	420	−25	1	Round of 16
3	Germany	2	0	2	5	17	−12	352	449	−97	0	Round of 16

Source: BadmintonCN
(H) Host

11 May 2008
08:00 UTC+7

Germany	2–3	Thailand
Report

Istora Gelora Bung Karno Court 1, Jakarta

11 May 2008
18:00 UTC+7

Indonesia	3–2	Thailand
Report

Istora Gelora Bung Karno Court 2, Jakarta

12 May 2008
13:00 UTC+7

Indonesia	5–0	Germany
Report

Istora Gelora Bung Karno Court 2, Jakarta

=== Knockout stage ===
==== Bracket ====
Round of 16
China
Bye
New Zealand	0
Thailand	3
Malaysia
Bye
Japan	3
Germany	2
Canada	0
South Korea	3
Bye
Denmark
England	3
Nigeria	0
Bye
Indonesia

Quarter-finals
China	3
Thailand	0
Malaysia	3
Japan	0
South Korea	3
Denmark	2
England	0
Indonesia	3

Semi-finals
China	3
Malaysia	2
South Korea	3
Indonesia	0

Final
China	3
South Korea	1

==== Round of 16 ====
13 May 2008
13:00 UTC+7

New Zealand	0–3	Thailand
Report

Istora Gelora Bung Karno Court 1, Jakarta

13 May 2008
13:00 UTC+7

Japan	3–2	Germany
Report

Istora Gelora Bung Karno Court 4, Jakarta

13 May 2008
18:00 UTC+7

Canada	0–3	South Korea
Report

Istora Gelora Bung Karno Court 2, Jakarta

13 May 2008
18:00 UTC+7

England	3–0	Nigeria
Report

Istora Gelora Bung Karno Court 1, Jakarta

==== Quarter-finals ====
14 May 2008
13:00 UTC+7

China	3–0	Thailand
Report

Istora Gelora Bung Karno Court 4, Jakarta

14 May 2008
13:00 UTC+7

Malaysia	3–0	Japan
Report

Istora Gelora Bung Karno Court 3, Jakarta

14 May 2008
18:00 UTC+7

Denmark	2–3	South Korea
Report

Istora Gelora Bung Karno Court 3, Jakarta

14 May 2008
18:00 UTC+7

Indonesia	3–0	England
Report

Istora Gelora Bung Karno Court 2, Jakarta

==== Semi-finals ====
16 May 2008
13:00 UTC+7

China	3–2	Malaysia
Report

Istora Gelora Bung Karno Court 1, Jakarta

16 May 2008
18:00 UTC+7

South Korea	3–0	Indonesia
Report

Istora Gelora Bung Karno Court 1, Jakarta

==== Final ====
18 May 2008
18:00 UTC+7

China	3–1	South Korea
Report

Istora Gelora Bung Karno Court 1, Jakarta

2008 Thomas Cup champion

China
Seventh title

== Uber Cup ==
=== Group stage ===
==== Group W ====
Pos	Team	Pld	W	L	GF	GA	GD	PF	PA	PD	Pts	Qualification
1	China	2	2	0	18	2	+16	378	136	+242	2	Quarter-finals
2	Germany	2	1	1	10	6	+4	284	271	+13	1	Round of 16
3	United States	2	0	2	0	20	−20	165	420	−255	0	Round of 16

Source: BadmintonCN

11 May 2008
08:00 UTC+7

China	5–0	United States
Report

Istora Gelora Bung Karno Court 3, Jakarta

11 May 2008
18:00 UTC+7

Germany	5–0	United States
Report

Istora Gelora Bung Karno Court 4, Jakarta

12 May 2008
13:00 UTC+7

China	4–1	Germany
Report

Istora Gelora Bung Karno Court 3, Jakarta

==== Group X ====
Pos	Team	Pld	W	L	GF	GA	GD	PF	PA	PD	Pts	Qualification
1	South Korea	2	2	0	20	1	+19	430	220	+210	2	Quarter-finals
2	Hong Kong	2	1	1	11	10	+1	370	319	+51	1	Round of 16
3	South Africa	2	0	2	0	20	−20	159	420	−261	0	Round of 16

Source: BadmintonCN

11 May 2008
13:00 UTC+7

South Korea	5–0	South Africa
Report

Istora Gelora Bung Karno Court 4, Jakarta

12 May 2008
08:00 UTC+7

Hong Kong	5–0	South Africa
Report

Istora Gelora Bung Karno Court 4, Jakarta

12 May 2008
18:00 UTC+7

South Korea	5–0	Hong Kong
Report

Istora Gelora Bung Karno Court 1, Jakarta

==== Group Y ====
Pos	Team	Pld	W	L	GF	GA	GD	PF	PA	PD	Pts	Qualification
1	Denmark	2	2	0	14	9	+5	431	392	+39	2	Quarter-finals
2	Malaysia	2	1	1	16	6	+10	444	337	+107	1	Round of 16
3	New Zealand	2	0	2	3	18	−15	276	422	−146	0	Round of 16

Source: BadmintonCN

11 May 2008
08:00 UTC+7

Malaysia	5–0	New Zealand
Report

Istora Gelora Bung Karno Court 4, Jakarta

11 May 2008
18:00 UTC+7

Denmark	4–1	New Zealand
Report

Istora Gelora Bung Karno Court 3, Jakarta

12 May 2008
13:00 UTC+7

Malaysia	2–3	Denmark
Report

Istora Gelora Bung Karno Court 4, Jakarta

==== Group Z ====
Pos	Team	Pld	W	L	GF	GA	GD	PF	PA	PD	Pts	Qualification
1	Indonesia (H)	2	2	0	19	4	+15	468	347	+121	2	Quarter-finals
2	Netherlands	2	1	1	7	14	−7	350	418	−68	1	Round of 16
3	Japan	2	0	2	8	16	−8	429	482	−53	0	Round of 16

Source: BadmintonCN
(H) Host

11 May 2008
13:00 UTC+7

Japan	1–4	Indonesia
Report

Istora Gelora Bung Karno Court 2, Jakarta

12 May 2008
08:00 UTC+7

Japan	2–3	Netherlands
Report

Istora Gelora Bung Karno Court 2, Jakarta

12 May 2008
18:00 UTC+7

Indonesia	5–0	Netherlands
Report

Istora Gelora Bung Karno Court 2, Jakarta

=== Knockout stage ===
==== Bracket ====
Round of 16
China
Bye
New Zealand	0
Netherlands	3
South Korea
Bye
Malaysia	3
Japan	0
Germany	3
South Africa	0
Bye
Denmark
Hong Kong	3
United States	0
Bye
Indonesia

Quarter-finals
China	3
Netherlands	2
South Korea	3
Malaysia	1
Germany	3
Denmark	0
Hong Kong	0
Indonesia	3

Semi-finals
China	3
South Korea	1
Germany	1
Indonesia	3

Final
China	3
Indonesia	0

==== Round of 16 ====
13 May 2008
13:00 UTC+7

New Zealand	0–3	Netherlands
Report

Istora Gelora Bung Karno Court 3, Jakarta

13 May 2008
13:00 UTC+7

Malaysia	3–0	Japan
Report

Istora Gelora Bung Karno Court 2, Jakarta

13 May 2008
18:00 UTC+7

Germany	3–0	South Africa
Report

Istora Gelora Bung Karno Court 3, Jakarta

13 May 2008
18:00 UTC+7

Hong Kong	3–0	United States
Report

Istora Gelora Bung Karno Court 4, Jakarta

==== Quarter-finals ====
14 May 2008
13:00 UTC+7

Denmark	0–3	Germany
Report

Istora Gelora Bung Karno Court 1, Jakarta

14 May 2008
13:00 UTC+7

Indonesia	3–0	Hong Kong
Report

Istora Gelora Bung Karno Court 2, Jakarta

14 May 2008
18:00 UTC+7

China	3–2	Netherlands
Report

Istora Gelora Bung Karno Court 1, Jakarta

14 May 2008
18:00 UTC+7

South Korea	3–1	Malaysia
Report

Istora Gelora Bung Karno Court 4, Jakarta

==== Semi-finals ====
15 May 2008
13:00 UTC+7

China	3–1	South Korea
Report

Istora Gelora Bung Karno Court 1, Jakarta

15 May 2008
18:00 UTC+7

Germany	1–3	Indonesia
Report

Istora Gelora Bung Karno Court 1, Jakarta

==== Final ====
17 May 2008
18:00 UTC+7

China	3–0	Indonesia
Report

Istora Gelora Bung Karno Court 1, Jakarta

2008 Uber Cup champion

China
Eleventh title

== Controversies ==
The controversy arose when an unfair scheduling forced some of the teams to play twice a day. Most of the teams were unhappy with the Badminton World Federation decision, including the Indonesia Uber Cup team who threatened to pull out from the tournament due to the scheduling affair, forcing organisers to amend the schedule.

Another controversy cropped up in the tournament was the decision of Korea Thomas Cup team to throw both of their group matches to get a better opposition in the knockout stage. They lost 4–1 in both group matches against England and Malaysia and soon admitted they played to lose the game. However, Korean manager denied any fault on them and blamed on the format. This controversy forced the BWF to reexamine the rules and format for future tournaments.
