= 2008 Uber Cup group stage =

This article lists the complete results of the group stage of the 2008 Uber Cup in Jakarta, Indonesia.

== Draw ==
=== Group composition ===
Group
Group W	Group X	Group Y	Group Z
China; Germany; United States	South Korea; Hong Kong; South Africa	Denmark; Malaysia; New Zealand	Indonesia (Host); Netherlands; Japan

== Group W ==
Pos	Team	Pld	W	L	MF	MA	MD	GF	GA	GD	PF	PA	PD	Pts	Qualification
1	China	2	2	0	9	1	+8	18	2	+16	378	136	+242	2	Quarter-finals
2	Germany	2	1	1	6	4	+2	10	6	+4	284	271	+13	1	Round of 16
3	United States	2	0	2	0	10	−10	0	20	−20	165	420	−255	0	Round of 16

Source: BadmintonCN

=== China vs United States ===
China
5
Istora Gelora Bung Karno, Court 3
11 May 2008, 08:00 UTC+7

United States
0

			1	2	3
1	(China) (United States)	Xie Xingfang; Eva Lee	21; 10	21; 7
2	(China) (United States)	Gao Ling / Zhao Tingting; Panita Phongasavithas / Vimla Phongasavithas	21; 5	21; 9
3	(China) (United States)	Lu Lan; Chen Kuei Ya	21; 5	21; 9
4	(China) (United States)	Yang Wei / Zhang Jiewen; Eva Lee / Mesinee Mangkalakiri	21; 5	21; 6
5	(China) (United States)	Zhu Lin; Rena Wang	21; 4	21; 8

=== Germany vs United States ===
Germany
5
Istora Gelora Bung Karno, Court 4
11 May 2008, 18:00 UTC+7

United States
0

			1	2	3
1	(Germany) (United States)	Xu Huaiwen; Lauren Todt	21; 9	21; 6
2	(Germany) (United States)	Juliane Schenk; Chen Kuei Ya	21; 5	21; 5
3	(Germany) (United States)	Karin Schaase; Rena Wang	21; 17	21; 5
4	(Germany) (United States)	Kathrin Piotrowski / Juliane Schenk; Eva Lee / Mesinee Mangkalakiri	21; 14	21; 13
5	(Germany) (United States)	Birgit Overzier / Michaela Peiffer; Vimla Phongasavithas / Panita Phongasavithas	21; 14	21; 15

=== China vs Germany ===
China
4
Istora Gelora Bung Karno, Court 3
12 May 2008, 13:00 UTC+7

Germany
1

			1	2	3
1	(China) (Germany)	Xie Xingfang; Xu Huaiwen	21; 10	21; 13
2	(China) (Germany)	Zhu Lin; Juliane Schenk	21; 18	21; 13
3	(China) (Germany)	Jiang Yanjiao; Carola Bott	21; 12	21; 8
4	(China) (Germany)	Wei Yili / Zhang Yawen; Michaela Peiffer / Kathrin Piotrowski				w/o
5	(China) (Germany)	Gao Ling / Zhao Tingting; Carola Bott / Karin Schnaase				w/o

A fallen bulb from the overhead lights cause the remaining fourth and fifth match abandoned, after the discussion, China takes walkover for fourth match while Germany takes walkover for fifth match.

== Group X ==
Pos	Team	Pld	W	L	MF	MA	MD	GF	GA	GD	PF	PA	PD	Pts	Qualification
1	South Korea	2	2	0	10	0	+10	20	1	+19	430	220	+210	2	Quarter-finals
2	Hong Kong	2	1	1	5	5	0	11	10	+1	370	319	+51	1	Round of 16
3	South Africa	2	0	2	0	10	−10	0	20	−20	159	420	−261	0	Round of 16

Source: BadmintonCN

=== South Korea vs South Africa ===
South Korea
5
Istora Gelora Bung Karno, Court 4
11 May 2008, 13:00 UTC+7

South Africa
0

			1	2	3
1	(South Korea) (South Africa)	Hwang Hye-youn; Kerry-Lee Harrington	21; 8	21; 7
2	(South Korea) (South Africa)	Lee Yun-hwa; Stacey Doubell	21; 6	21; 4
3	(South Korea) (South Africa)	Bae Yeon-ju; Annari Viljoen	21; 6	21; 4
4	(South Korea) (South Africa)	Lee Hyo-jung / Lee Kyung-won; Chantal Botts / Michelle Edwards	21; 7	21; 7
5	(South Korea) (South Africa)	Ha Jung-eun / Kim Min-jung; Jade Morgan / Annari Viljoen	21; 5	21; 6

=== Hong Kong vs South Africa ===
Hong Kong
5
Istora Gelora Bung Karno, Court 4
12 May 2008, 08:00 UTC+7

South Africa
0

			1	2	3
1	(Hong Kong) (South Africa)	Yip Pui Yin; Kerry-Lee Harrington	21; 6	21; 7
2	(Hong Kong) (South Africa)	Mong Kwan Yi; Stacey Doubell	21; 6	21; 9
3	(Hong Kong) (South Africa)	Ng Ka Shun; Annari Viljoen	21; 18	21; 10
4	(Hong Kong) (South Africa)	Chau Hoi Wah / Koon Wai Chee; Chantal Botts / Michelle Edwards	21; 19	21; 10
5	(Hong Kong) (South Africa)	Chan Tsz Ka / Tse Ying Suet; Jade Morgan / Annari Viljoen	21; 6	21; 8

=== South Korea vs Hong Kong ===
South Korea
5
Istora Gelora Bung Karno, Court 1
12 May 2008, 18:00 UTC+7

Hong Kong
0

			1	2	3
1	(South Korea) (Hong Kong)	Hwang Hye-youn; Yip Pui Yin	10; 21	21; 17	21; 15
2	(South Korea) (Hong Kong)	Lee Yun-hwa; Ng Ka Shun	21; 12	21; 17
3	(South Korea) (Hong Kong)	Jang Soo-young; Chan Tsz Ka	21; 14	21; 9
4	(South Korea) (Hong Kong)	Lee Hyo-jung / Lee Kyung-won; Koon Wai Chee / Mong Kwan Yi	21; 11	21; 15
5	(South Korea) (Hong Kong)	Ha Jung-eun / Kim Min-jung; Chan Tsz Ka / Tse Ying Suet	21; 18	21; 11

== Group Y ==
Pos	Team	Pld	W	L	MF	MA	MD	GF	GA	GD	PF	PA	PD	Pts	Qualification
1	Denmark	2	2	0	7	3	+4	14	9	+5	431	392	+39	2	Quarter-finals
2	Malaysia	2	1	1	7	3	+4	16	6	+10	444	337	+107	1	Round of 16
3	New Zealand	2	0	2	1	9	−8	3	18	−15	276	422	−146	0	Round of 16

Source: BadmintonCN

=== Malaysia vs New Zealand ===
Malaysia
5
Istora Gelora Bung Karno, Court 4
11 May 2008, 08:00 UTC+7

New Zealand
0

			1	2	3
1	(Malaysia) (New Zealand)	Wong Mew Choo; Rachel Hindley	21; 18	21; 6
2	(Malaysia) (New Zealand)	Lim Pek Siah / Ng Hui Lin; Donna Cranston / Emma Rodgers	21; 7	21; 16
3	(Malaysia) (New Zealand)	Julia Wong Pei Xian; Michelle Chan	21; 18	21; 7
4	(Malaysia) (New Zealand)	Chin Eei Hui / Wong Pei Tty; Renee Flavell / Rachel Hindley	21; 13	21; 14
5	(Malaysia) (New Zealand)	Lydia Cheah Li Ya; Jessica Jonggowisastro	21; 11	21; 8

=== Denmark vs New Zealand ===
Denmark
4
Istora Gelora Bung Karno, Court 3
11 May 2008, 18:00 UTC+7

New Zealand
1

			1	2	3
1	(Denmark) (New Zealand)	Tine Rasmussen; Rachel Hindley	21; 9	21; 9
2	(Denmark) (New Zealand)	Mie Schjøtt-Kristensen / Christinna Pedersen; Renee Flavell / Danielle Barry	21; 10	21; 8
3	(Denmark) (New Zealand)	Nanna Brosolat Jensen; Michelle Chan	21; 8	12; 21	23; 21
4	(Denmark) (New Zealand)	Helle Nielsen / Marie Røpke; Donna Cranston / Emma Rodgers	21; 12
5	(Denmark) (New Zealand)	Camilla Sørensen; Jessica Janggowisastro	17; 21	11; 21

=== Malaysia vs Denmark ===
Malaysia
2
Istora Gelora Bung Karno, Court 4
12 May 2008, 13:00 UTC+7

Denmark
3

			1	2	3
1	(Malaysia) (Denmark)	Wong Mew Choo; Tine Rasmussen	21; 19	19; 21	14; 21
2	(Malaysia) (Denmark)	Chin Eei Hui / Wong Pei Tty; Kamilla Rytter Juhl / Marie Røpke	22; 20	21; 16
3	(Malaysia) (Denmark)	Julia Wong Pei Xian; Nanna Brosolat Jensen	21; 13	19; 21	19; 21
4	(Malaysia) (Denmark)	Lim Pek Siah / Ng Hui Lin; Mie Schjøtt-Kristensen / Christinna Pedersen	18; 21	18; 21
5	(Malaysia) (Denmark)	Lydia Cheah Li Ya; Camilla Sørensen	21; 11	21; 14

== Group Z ==
Pos	Team	Pld	W	L	MF	MA	MD	GF	GA	GD	PF	PA	PD	Pts	Qualification
1	Indonesia (H)	2	2	0	9	1	+8	19	4	+15	468	347	+121	2	Quarter-finals
2	Netherlands	2	1	1	3	7	−4	7	14	−7	350	418	−68	1	Round of 16
3	Japan	2	0	2	3	7	−4	8	16	−8	429	482	−53	0	Round of 16

Source: BadmintonCN
(H) Host

=== Japan vs Indonesia ===
Japan
1
Istora Gelora Bung Karno, Court 2
11 May 2008, 13:00 UTC+7

Indonesia
4

			1	2	3
1	(Japan) (Indonesia)	Eriko Hirose; Maria Kristin Yulianti	9; 21	22; 20	22; 20
2	(Japan) (Indonesia)	Miyuki Maeda / Satoko Suetsuna; Vita Marissa / Liliyana Natsir	21; 9	19; 21	14; 21
3	(Japan) (Indonesia)	Yu Hirayama; Adriyanti Firdasari	11; 21	22; 20	13; 21
4	(Japan) (Indonesia)	Tomomi Matsuda / Reiko Shiota; Jo Novita / Greysia Polii	14; 21	18; 21
5	(Japan) (Indonesia)	Kaori Mori; Pia Zebadiah	19; 21	17; 21

=== Japan vs Netherlands ===
Japan
2
Istora Gelora Bung Karno, Court 2
12 May 2008, 08:00 UTC+7

Netherlands
3

			1	2	3
1	(Japan) (Netherlands)	Eriko Hirose; Yao Jie	16; 21	19; 21
2	(Japan) (Netherlands)	Yu Hirayama; Judith Meulendijks	17; 21	16; 21
3	(Japan) (Netherlands)	Miyuki Maeda / Satoko Suetsuna; Rachel van Cutsen / Paulien van Dooremalen	21; 19	21; 15
4	(Japan) (Netherlands)	Kaori Imabeppu; Karina de Wit	23; 21	14; 21	21; 19
5	(Japan) (Netherlands)	Tomomi Matsuda / Reiko Shiota; Yao Jie / Judith Meulendijks	18; 21	22; 24

=== Indonesia vs Netherlands ===
Indonesia
5
Istora Gelora Bung Karno, Court 2
12 May 2008, 18:00 UTC+7

Netherlands
0

			1	2	3
1	(Indonesia) (Netherlands)	Maria Kristin Yulianti; Rachel van Cutsen	21; 7	21; 14
2	(Indonesia) (Netherlands)	Jo Novita / Greysia Polii; Eefje Muskens / Iise Vaessen	21; 11	21; 18
3	(Indonesia) (Netherlands)	Adriyanti Firdasari; Patty Stolzenbach	21; 15	21; 14
4	(Indonesia) (Netherlands)	Liliyana Natsir / Vita Marissa; Rachel van Cutsen / Paulien van Dooremalen	21; 11	21; 11
5	(Indonesia) (Netherlands)	Pia Zebadiah; Wong Yik Man	21; 13	21; 12
