= Shintaro Ikeda =

Japanese badminton player (born 1980)

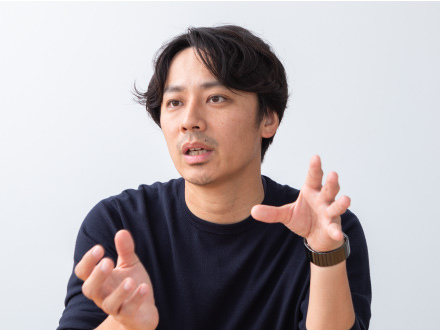
- Ikeda in 2019

Personal information
- Born: 27 December 1980 (age 45) Ōnojō Fukuoka, Japan
- Height: 1.75 m (5 ft 9 in)
- Weight: 69 kg (152 lb)

Sport
- Country: Japan
- Sport: Badminton
- Handedness: Right

Men's & mixed doubles
- Highest ranking: 8 (XD with Reiko Shiota, 2 October 2012); 11 (MD with Shuichi Sakamoto, 21 August 2007)
- BWF profile
Medal record
Men's Badminton
Representing Japan
World Championships
Bronze medal – third place	2007 Kuala Lumpur	Men's doubles
East Asian Games
Bronze medal – third place	2009 Hong Kong	Men's team

Shintaro Ikeda (池田 信太郎, Ikeda Shintaro; born 27 December 1980 in Fukuoka) is a male badminton player from Japan.

== Career ==
Ikeda won the bronze medal at the 2007 World Championships in men's doubles with Shuichi Sakamoto, marking the first-ever medal won by Japanese men since the tournament's inception in 1977. They were defeated in the semifinals by Jung Jae-sung and Lee Yong-dae of South Korea, 16–21, 12–21.

He has taken part at two Olympic Games, competing in the men's doubles with Shuichi Sakamoto in 2008 and the mixed doubles with Reiko Shiota in 2012.

== Awards and nominations ==
Award	Year	Category	Result	Ref.
Japanese Olympic Committee (JOC) Awards	2007	Special Achievement	Won	
Ministry of Education, Culture, Sports, Science and Technology Awards	2007	International Competition Outstanding Achievement	Won	

== Achievements ==
=== World Championships ===
Men's doubles
Year	Venue	Partner	Opponent	Score	Result	Ref.
2007	Putra Indoor Stadium; Kuala Lumpur, Malaysia	(Japan) Shuichi Sakamoto	(South Korea) Jung Jae-sung (South Korea) Lee Yong-dae	16–21, 12–21	Bronze	

=== BWF Superseries (1 runner-up) ===
The BWF Superseries, which was launched on 14 December 2006 and implemented in 2007, was a series of elite badminton tournaments, sanctioned by the Badminton World Federation (BWF). BWF Superseries levels were Superseries and Superseries Premier. A season of Superseries consisted of twelve tournaments around the world that had been introduced since 2011. Successful players were invited to the Superseries Finals, which were held at the end of each year.

Mixed doubles
Year	Tournament	Partner	Opponent	Score	Result
2012	Singapore Open	(Japan) Reiko Shiota	(Chinese Taipei) Chen Hung-ling (Chinese Taipei) Cheng Wen-hsing	17–21, 11–21	(silver) Runner-up

BWF Super Series tournament

=== BWF Grand Prix ===
The BWF Grand Prix has two levels, the Grand Prix and Grand Prix Gold. It is a series of badminton tournaments, sanctioned by the Badminton World Federation (BWF) since 2007. The World Badminton Grand Prix sanctioned by International Badminton Federation since 1983.

Men's doubles
Year	Tournament	Partner	Opponent	Score	Result	Ref.
2007	Russian Open	(Japan) Shuichi Sakamoto	(Germany) Kristof Hopp (Germany) Ingo Kindervater	16–21, 20–22	(silver) Runner-up	

Mixed doubles
Year	Tournament	Partner	Opponent	Score	Result	Ref.
2010	Dutch Open	(Japan) Reiko Shiota	(Russia) Alexandr Nikolaenko (Russia) Valeri Sorokina	20–22, 9–21	(silver) Runner-up	
2011	German Open	(Japan) Reiko Shiota	(Scotland) Robert Blair (England) Gabrielle White	21–16, 16–21, 15–21	(silver) Runner-up	
2011	Russian Open	(Japan) Reiko Shiota	(Russia) Alexandr Nikolaenko (Russia) Valeri Sorokina	18–21, 14–21	(silver) Runner-up	

BWF Grand Prix Gold tournament
BWF Grand Prix tournament

=== BWF International Challenge/Series ===
Men's doubles
Year	Tournament	Partner	Opponent	Score	Result	Ref.
2007	Osaka International	(Japan) Shuichi Sakamoto	(South Korea) Cho Gun-woo (South Korea) Han Sang-hoon	18–21, 21–16, 11–21	(silver) Runner-up	

BWF International Challenge tournament
