= Shuichi Sakamoto =

Japanese badminton player (born 1979)

Personal information
- Born: 14 June 1979 (age 47) Ishioka, Ibaraki, Japan
- Height: 1.75 m (5 ft 9 in)
- Weight: 69 kg (152 lb)

Sport
- Country: Japan
- Sport: Badminton
- Handedness: Right

Men's & mixed doubles
- Highest ranking: 11 (MD with Shintaro Ikeda, 21 August 2007); 92 (XD with Miyuki Maeda, 21 June 2005)
Medal record
Men's Badminton
Representing Japan
World Championships
Bronze medal – third place	2007 Kuala Lumpur	Men's doubles

Shuichi Sakamoto (坂本 修一, Sakamoto Shuichi; born June 14, 1979 in Ibaraki) is a male badminton player from Japan.

== Career ==
Sakamoto won the bronze medal at the 2007 World Championships in men's doubles with Shintaro Ikeda, marking the first-ever medal won by Japanese men since the tournament's inception in 1977. They were defeated in the semifinals by Jung Jae-sung and Lee Yong-dae of South Korea, 16–21, 12–21.

== Awards and nominations ==
Award	Year	Category	Result	Ref.
Japanese Olympic Committee (JOC) Awards	2007	Special Achievement	Won	
Ministry of Education, Culture, Sports, Science and Technology Awards	2007	International Competition Outstanding Achievement	Won	

== Achievement ==
=== World Championships ===
Men's doubles
Year	Venue	Partner	Opponent	Score	Result	Ref.
2007	Putra Indoor Stadium, Kuala Lumpur, Malaysia	(Japan) Shintaro Ikeda	(South Korea) Jung Jae-sung (South Korea) Lee Yong-dae	16–21, 12–21	Bronze	

=== BWF Grand Prix (1 runner-up) ===
The BWF Grand Prix has two levels, the Grand Prix and Grand Prix Gold. It is a series of badminton tournaments, sanctioned by the Badminton World Federation (BWF) since 2007. The World Badminton Grand Prix sanctioned by International Badminton Federation since 1983.

Men's doubles
Year	Tournament	Partner	Opponent	Score	Result	Ref.
2007	Russian Open	(Japan) Shintaro Ikeda	(Germany) Kristof Hopp (Germany) Ingo Kindervater	16–21, 20–22	(silver) Runner-up	

BWF Grand Prix Gold tournament

=== BWF International Challenge/Series (3 titles, 4 runners-up) ===
Men's doubles
Year	Tournament	Partner	Opponent	Score	Result	Ref.
2002	Western Australia International	(Japan) Shuichi Nakao	(New Zealand) John Gordon (New Zealand) Daniel Shirley	7–5, 4–7, 4–7, 7–2, 4–7	(silver) Runner-up	
2002	Macau Satellite	(Japan) Shuichi Nakao	(Thailand) Patapol Ngernsrisuk (Thailand) Khunakorn Sudhisodhi	15–5, 2–15, 6–15	(silver) Runner-up	
2003	Iran Fajr International	(Japan) Shuichi Nakao	(Japan) Yuichi Ikeda (Japan) Shōji Satō	15–4, 13–15, 5–15	(silver) Runner-up	
2003	Sri Lanka International	(Japan) Shuichi Nakao	(Sri Lanka) Duminda Jayakody (Sri Lanka) Chameera Kumarapperuma	15–5, 15–7	(gold) Winner	
2003	Mauritius International	(Japan) Shuichi Nakao	(Germany) Ingo Kindervater (Germany) Björn Siegemund	15–8, 17–15	(gold) Winner	
2004	New Zealand International	(Japan) Shuichi Nakao	(United States) Khan Malaythong (United States) Raju Rai	15–3, 10–15, 15–12	(gold) Winner	
2007	Osaka International	(Japan) Shintaro Ikeda	(South Korea) Cho Gun-woo (South Korea) Han Sang-hoon	18–21, 21–16, 11–21	(silver) Runner-up	

BWF International Challenge tournament
BWF International Series tournament
