= 2009 All England Super Series – Men's doubles =

This article list the results of men's doubles category in the 2009 All England Super Series.

== Seeds ==
1. (Indonesia) Markis Kido and Hendra Setiawan
2. (Denmark) Lars Paaske and Jonas Rasmussen
3. (Malaysia) Koo Kien Keat and Tan Boon Heong
4. (Malaysia) Mohd Zakry Abdul Latif and Mohd Fairuzizuan Mohd Tazari
5. (Denmark) Mathias Boe and Carsten Mogensen
6. (South Korea) Lee Yong-dae and Shin Baek-cheol
7. (China) Cai Yun and Fu Haifeng
8. (England) Anthony Clark and Nathan Robertson

== Draws ==
=== Finals ===
Semifinals
6	(South Korea) Lee Yong-dae (South Korea) Shin Baek-cheol	17	18
(South Korea) Han Sang-hoon (South Korea) Hwang Ji-man	21	21
5	(Denmark) Mathias Boe (Denmark) Carsten Mogensen	21	14
7	(China) Cai Yun (China) Fu Haifeng	23	21

Final
(South Korea) Han Sang-hoon (South Korea) Hwang Ji-man	17	15
7	(China) Cai Yun (China) Fu Haifeng	21	21

=== Top Half ===
First Round
PFQ	(Denmark) Kasper Faust Henriksen (Denmark) Christian John Skovgaard	14	21	21
(Germany) Kristof Hopp (Germany) Johannes Schoettler	21	18	19
(Indonesia) Mohammad Ahsan (Indonesia) Bona Septano	21	16	21
Q	(China) He Hanbin (China) Sun Junjie	15	21	15
6	(South Korea) Lee Yong-dae (South Korea) Shin Baek-cheol	21	21
(Chinese Taipei) Fang Chieh-Min (Chinese Taipei) Lee Sheng-Mu	19	18
(Netherlands) Jorrit de Ruiter (Netherlands) Jürgen Wouters	21	12	22
(England) Chris Langridge (England) David Lindley	14	21	20
4	(Malaysia) Mohd Zakry Abdul Latif (Malaysia) Mohd Fairuzizuan Mohd Tazari	22	12	21
(Indonesia) Yonathan Suryatama Dasuki (Indonesia) Rian Sukmawan	20	21	18
(Denmark) Anders Kristiansen (Denmark) Simon Mollyhus	19	21	21
(England) Chris Adcock (England) Robert Blair	21	17	12
8	(England) Anthony Clark (England) Nathan Robertson Ret.
(South Korea) Han Sang-hoon (South Korea) Hwang Ji-man
(South Korea) Cho Gun-woo (South Korea) Ko Sung-hyun	18	17
Q	(Japan) Kenichi Hayakawa (Japan) Kenta Kazuno	21	21

Second Round
PFQ	(Denmark) Kasper Faust Henriksen (Denmark) Christian John Skovgaard	21	17	14
(Indonesia) Mohammad Ahsan (Indonesia) Bona Septano	12	21	21
6	(South Korea) Lee Yong-dae (South Korea) Shin Baek-cheol	21	21
(Netherlands) Jorrit de Ruiter (Netherlands) Jürgen Wouters	11	7
4	(Malaysia) Mohd Zakry Abdul Latif (Malaysia) Mohd Fairuzizuan Mohd Tazari	21
(Denmark) Anders Kristiansen (Denmark) Simon Mollyhus Ret.	20
(South Korea) Han Sang-hoon (South Korea) Hwang Ji-man	21	21
Q	(Japan) Kenichi Hayakawa (Japan) Kenta Kazuno	15	15

Quarterfinals
(Indonesia) Mohammad Ahsan (Indonesia) Bona Septano	21	15	14
6	(South Korea) Lee Yong-dae (South Korea) Shin Baek-cheol	17	21	21
4	(Malaysia) Mohd Zakry Abdul Latif (Malaysia) Mohd Fairuzizuan Mohd Tazari	9	20
(South Korea) Han Sang-hoon (South Korea) Hwang Ji-man	21	22

Semifinals
6	(South Korea) Lee Yong-dae (South Korea) Shin Baek-cheol	17	18
(South Korea) Han Sang-hoon (South Korea) Hwang Ji-man	21	21

=== Bottom Half ===
First Round
Q	(Denmark) Rasmus Bonde (Denmark) Mikkel Delbo Larsen	21	13
(Germany) Michael Fuchs (Germany) Ingo Kindervater	23	21
Q	(China) Guo Zhendong (China) Xu Chen	21	15	15
5	(Denmark) Mathias Boe (Denmark) Carsten Mogensen	17	21	21
(Indonesia) Joko Riyadi (Indonesia) Candra Wijaya	22	19	21
(Malaysia) Gan Teik Chai (Malaysia) Tan Bin Shen	20	21	23
(England) Richard Eidestedt (England) Andrew Ellis	21	7	19
3	(Malaysia) Koo Kien Keat (Malaysia) Tan Boon Heong	15	21	21
(South Korea) Kwon Yi-goo (South Korea) Yoo Yeon-seong	22	21
(Poland) Michał Łogosz (Poland) Robert Mateusiak	20	17
(Germany) Peter Kaesbauer (Germany) Roman Spitko	15	14
7	(China) Cai Yun (China) Fu Haifeng	21	21
(Japan) Shintaro Ikeda (Japan) Shuichi Sakamoto	11	21	21
(United States) Howard Bach (United States) Tony Gunawan	21	18	11
(Netherlands) Ruud Bosch (Netherlands) Koen Ridder	9	13
2	(Denmark) Lars Paaske (Denmark) Jonas Rasmussen	21	21

Second Round
(Germany) Michael Fuchs (Germany) Ingo Kindervater	18	11
5	(Denmark) Mathias Boe (Denmark) Carsten Mogensen	21	21
(Malaysia) Gan Teik Chai (Malaysia) Tan Bin Shen	18	14
3	(Malaysia) Koo Kien Keat (Malaysia) Tan Boon Heong	21	21
(South Korea) Kwon Yi-goo (South Korea) Yoo Yeon-seong	13	10
7	(China) Cai Yun (China) Fu Haifeng	21	21
(Japan) Shintaro Ikeda (Japan) Shuichi Sakamoto	11	16
2	(Denmark) Lars Paaske (Denmark) Jonas Rasmussen	21	21

Quarterfinals
5	(Denmark) Mathias Boe (Denmark) Carsten Mogensen	21	21
3	(Malaysia) Koo Kien Keat (Malaysia) Tan Boon Heong	7	17
7	(China) Cai Yun (China) Fu Haifeng	21	21
2	(Denmark) Lars Paaske (Denmark) Jonas Rasmussen	17	16

Semifinals
5	(Denmark) Mathias Boe (Denmark) Carsten Mogensen	21	14
7	(China) Cai Yun (China) Fu Haifeng	23	21

== Sources ==
Yonex All England Open Super Series 2009 - Men's doubles
