= Badminton at the 2012 Summer Olympics – Men's doubles =

Men's doubles at the Games of the XXX Olympiad
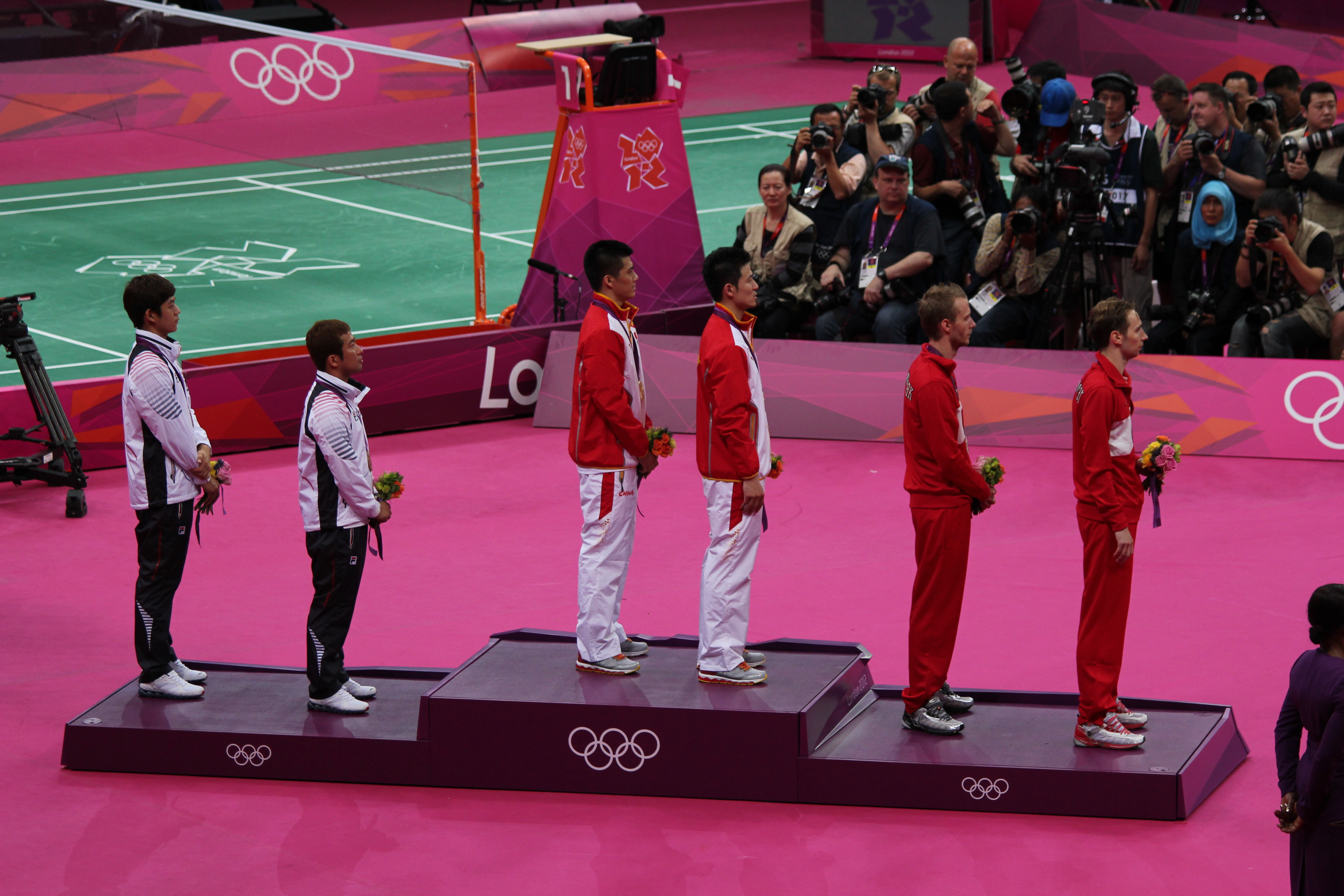
- Men's doubles victory ceremony
- Venue: Wembley Arena
- Date: 28 July to 5 August 2012
- Competitors: 32 from 14 nations

Medalists
1st place, gold medalist(s)		Cai Yun; Fu Haifeng	China
2nd place, silver medalist(s)		Mathias Boe; Carsten Mogensen	Denmark
3rd place, bronze medalist(s)		Jung Jae-sung; Lee Yong-dae	South Korea

The badminton men's doubles tournament at the 2012 Olympic Games in London took place from 28 July to 5 August at Wembley Arena. The draw was held on 23 July 2012. Thirty-two players from 14 nations competed in the event.

Cai Yun and Fu Haifeng of China, whom were the silver medalists in the men's doubles event in 2008, defeated Denmark's Mathias Boe and Carsten Mogensen in the final, 21–16, 21–15, to win the gold medal in men's doubles badminton at the 2012 Summer Olympics. Their win made China the first and only country to win gold medals in all five disciplines of badminton in a single Olympics. In the bronze-medal match, South Korea's Jung Jae-sung and Lee Yong-dae defeated Malaysia's Koo Kien Keat and Tan Boon Heong 23–21, 21–10. It was South Korea's second consecutive bronze medal at the event and sixth men's doubles badminton Olympic medal overall in four consecutive Olympic games.

== Competition format ==
The tournament started with a group phase round-robin followed by a knockout stage.

== Seeds ==
1. Cai Yun / Fu Haifeng (CHN) (gold Medallists)
2. Jung Jae-sung / Lee Yong-dae (KOR) (bronze Medallists)
3. Mathias Boe / Carsten Mogensen (DEN) (silver Medallists)
4. Ko Sung-hyun / Yoo Yeon-seong (KOR) (group stage)

== Results ==
=== Group stage ===
==== Group A ====
Team	Pld	W	L	SW	SL	Pts
Cai Yun / Fu Haifeng (CHN)	3	3	0	6	0	3
Fang Chieh-min / Lee Sheng-mu (TPE)	3	2	1	4	2	2
Ingo Kindervater / Johannes Schöttler (GER)	3	1	2	2	4	1
Ross Smith / Glenn Warfe (AUS)	3	0	3	0	6	0

Team 1	Score	Team 2
28 July, 19:05
Cai Y / Fu H (CHN)	21–11; 21–17	Smith / Warfe (AUS)
28 July, 19:09
Fang C-m / Lee S-m (TPE)	21–15; 21–16	Kindervater / Schöttler (GER)
29 July, 09:44
Fang C-m / Lee S-m (TPE)	21–14; 21–13	Smith / Warfe (AUS)
29 July, 20:19
Cai Y / Fu H (CHN)	22–20; 21–16	Kindervater / Schöttler (GER)
30 July, 12:30
Kindervater / Schöttler (GER)	21–13; 21–14	Smith / Warfe (AUS)
31 July, 19:42
Cai Y / Fu H (CHN)	21–19; 21–13	Fang C-m / Lee S-m (TPE)

==== Group B ====
Team	Pld	W	L	SW	SL	Pts
Bodin Isara / Maneepong Jongjit (THA)	3	3	0	6	0	3
Mohammad Ahsan / Bona Septano (INA)	3	2	1	4	2	2
Ko Sung-hyun / Yoo Yeon-seong (KOR)	3	1	2	2	4	1
Adam Cwalina / Michał Łogosz (POL)^{1}	–	–	–	–	–	–

Team 1	Score	Team 2
28 July, 12:30
Ko S-h / Yoo Y-s (KOR)	17–21; 21–7; 21–13^{1}	Cwalina / Łogosz (POL)
28 July, 20:17
Ahsan / Septano (INA)	11–21; 16–21	Isara / Jongjit (THA)
29 July, 15:20
Ko S-h / Yoo Y-s (KOR)	15–21; 14–21	Isara / Jongjit (THA)
30 July, 14:17
Isara / Jongjit (THA)	w/o^{1}	Cwalina / Łogosz (POL)
30 July, 18:30
Ko S-h / Yoo Y-s (KOR)	22–24; 12–21	Ahsan / Septano (INA)
31 July, 12:30
Ahsan / Septano (INA)	w/o^{1}	Cwalina / Łogosz (POL)

^{1} Cwalina / Łogosz retired from the competition after Łogosz pulled an Achillies tendon during the third set of the first match.

==== Group C ====
Team	Pld	W	L	SW	SL	Pts
Mathias Boe / Carsten Mogensen (DEN)	3	3	0	6	1	3
Chai Biao / Guo Zhendong (CHN)	3	2	1	4	2	2
Vladimir Ivanov / Ivan Sozonov (RUS)	3	1	2	3	4	1
Dorian Lance James / Willem Viljoen (RSA)	3	0	3	0	6	0

Team 1	Score	Team 2
28 July, 19:07
Boe / Mogensen (DEN)	21–6; 21–12	James / Viljoen (RSA)
29 July, 09:42
Chai B / Guo Z (CHN)	21–8; 21–13	James / Viljoen (RSA)
29 July, 18:30
Boe / Mogensen (DEN)	16–21; 21–19; 21–14	Ivanov / Sozonov (RUS)
30 July, 19:07
Chai B / Guo Z (CHN)	23–21; 21–15	Ivanov / Sozonov (RUS)
31 July, 09:44
Boe / Mogensen (DEN)	21–14; 21–19	Chai B / Guo Z (CHN)
31 July, 20:52
Ivanov / Sozonov (RUS)	21–13; 21–15	James / Viljoen (RSA)

==== Group D ====
Team	Pld	W	L	SW	SL	Pts
Jung Jae-sung / Lee Yong-dae (KOR)	3	3	0	6	0	3
Koo Kien Keat / Tan Boon Heong (MAS)	3	2	1	4	2	2
Naoki Kawamae / Shoji Sato (JPN)	3	1	2	2	4	1
Howard Bach / Tony Gunawan (USA)	3	0	3	0	6	0

Team 1	Score	Team 2
28 July, 13:07
Koo / Tan (MAS)	21–12; 21–14	Kawamae / Sato (JPN)
28 July, 18:30
Jung J-s / Lee Y-d (KOR)	21–14; 21–19	Bach / Gunawan (USA)
29 July, 14:15
Koo / Tan (MAS)	21–12; 21–14	Bach / Gunawan (USA)
29 July, 19:40
Jung J-s / Lee Y-d (KOR)	21–16; 21–15	Kawamae / Sato (JPN)
30 July, 14:19
Kawamae / Sato (JPN)	21–15; 21–15	Bach / Gunawan (USA)
31 July, 18:30
Jung J-s / Lee Y-d (KOR)	21–16; 21–11	Koo / Tan (MAS)

=== Finals ===
Quarter-finals
A1	Cai Yun (CHN); Fu Haifeng (CHN)	21	21
C2	Chai Biao (CHN); Guo Zhendong (CHN)	15	19
B1	Bodin Isara (THA); Maneepong Jongjit (THA)	16	18
D2	Koo Kien Keat (MAS); Tan Boon Heong (MAS)	21	21
A2	Fang Chieh-min (TPE); Lee Sheng-mu (TPE)	16	18
C1	Mathias Boe (DEN); Carsten Mogensen (DEN)	21	21
B2	Mohammad Ahsan (INA); Bona Septano (INA)	12	16
D1	Jung Jae-sung (KOR); Lee Yong-dae (KOR)	21	21

Semi-finals
A1	Cai Yun (CHN); Fu Haifeng (CHN)	21	21
D2	Koo Kien Keat (MAS); Tan Boon Heong (MAS)	9	19
C1	Mathias Boe (DEN); Carsten Mogensen (DEN)	17	21	22
D1	Jung Jae-sung (KOR); Lee Yong-dae (KOR)	21	18	20

Final
A1	Cai Yun (CHN); Fu Haifeng (CHN)	21	21
C1	Mathias Boe (DEN); Carsten Mogensen (DEN)	16	15
Bronze-medal match
D2	Koo Kien Keat (MAS); Tan Boon Heong (MAS)	21	10
D1	Jung Jae-sung (KOR); Lee Yong-dae (KOR)	23	21
