= Badminton at the 2010 Asian Games – Men's doubles =

Men's doubles at the 2010 Asian Games
- Venue: Tianhe Gymnasium
- Dates: 16–20 November
- Competitors: 46 from 13 nations

Medalists
gold medal	Markis Kido; Hendra Setiawan	Indonesia
silver medal	Koo Kien Keat; Tan Boon Heong	Malaysia
bronze medal	Mohammad Ahsan; Alvent Yulianto	Indonesia
bronze medal	Jung Jae-sung; Lee Yong-dae	South Korea

The badminton men's doubles tournament at the 2010 Asian Games in Guangzhou took place from 16 November to 20 November at Tianhe Gymnasium.

== Schedule ==
All times are China Standard Time (UTC+08:00)

Date	Time	Event
Tuesday, 16 November 2010	09:30	Round of 32
Wednesday, 17 November 2010	19:00	Round of 16
Thursday, 18 November 2010	11:00	Quarterfinals
Friday, 19 November 2010	19:30	Semifinals
Saturday, 20 November 2010	21:00	Final

== Results ==
Legend

- WO — Won by walkover

=== Final ===
Final
1	Koo Kien Keat (MAS); Tan Boon Heong (MAS)	21	24	19
2	Markis Kido (INA); Hendra Setiawan (INA)	16	26	21

=== Top half ===
Round of 32
Hirokatsu Hashimoto (JPN); Noriyasu Hirata (JPN)	21	21
Leung Chun Yiu (HKG); Wong Wing Ki (HKG)	10	9
Mohamed Sharim (MDV); Zaki Zayan (MDV)	5	8
Mohammad Ahsan (INA); Alvent Yulianto (INA)	21	21
Olonbayaryn Enkhbat (MGL); Pürevsürengiin Sainbuyan (MGL)	8	10
Songphon Anugritayawon (THA); Sudket Prapakamol (THA)	21	21

Round of 16
1	Koo Kien Keat (MAS); Tan Boon Heong (MAS)	21	21
Sanave Thomas (IND); Rupesh Kumar K. T. (IND)	15	19
6	Ko Sung-hyun (KOR); Yoo Yeon-seong (KOR)	16	19
Hirokatsu Hashimoto (JPN); Noriyasu Hirata (JPN)	21	21
4	Fang Chieh-min (TPE); Lee Sheng-mu (TPE)	14	21	9
Mohammad Ahsan (INA); Alvent Yulianto (INA)	21	16	21
5	Guo Zhendong (CHN); Xu Chen (CHN)	21	21
Songphon Anugritayawon (THA); Sudket Prapakamol (THA)	12	17

Quarterfinals
1	Koo Kien Keat (MAS); Tan Boon Heong (MAS)	21	13	21
Hirokatsu Hashimoto (JPN); Noriyasu Hirata (JPN)	19	21	18
Mohammad Ahsan (INA); Alvent Yulianto (INA)	14	21	21
5	Guo Zhendong (CHN); Xu Chen (CHN)	21	19	16

Semifinals
1	Koo Kien Keat (MAS); Tan Boon Heong (MAS)	21	21
Mohammad Ahsan (INA); Alvent Yulianto (INA)	19	16

=== Bottom half ===
Round of 32
Yohan Hadikusumo (HKG); Wong Wai Hong (HKG)	21	21
Ratnajit Tamang (NEP); Sajan Krishna Tamrakar (NEP)	5	10
Dinuka Karunaratne (SRI); Niluka Karunaratne (SRI)
Akshay Dewalkar (IND); Arun Vishnu (IND)	W	O
Enkhboldyn Erdenebayar (MGL); Mönkhbaataryn Zolzayaa (MGL)	2	4
Bodin Isara (THA); Maneepong Jongjit (THA)	21	21
Mak Hee Chun (MAS); Tan Wee Kiong (MAS)	17	6
Hiroyuki Endo (JPN); Kenichi Hayakawa (JPN)	21	21

Round of 16
Yohan Hadikusumo (HKG); Wong Wai Hong (HKG)	14	17
7	Cai Yun (CHN); Fu Haifeng (CHN)	21	21
Akshay Dewalkar (IND); Arun Vishnu (IND)	14	14
3	Jung Jae-sung (KOR); Lee Yong-dae (KOR)	21	21
Bodin Isara (THA); Maneepong Jongjit (THA)	18	12
8	Chen Hung-ling (TPE); Lin Yu-lang (TPE)	21	21
Hiroyuki Endo (JPN); Kenichi Hayakawa (JPN)	15	21	17
2	Markis Kido (INA); Hendra Setiawan (INA)	21	19	21

Quarterfinals
7	Cai Yun (CHN); Fu Haifeng (CHN)	16	12
3	Jung Jae-sung (KOR); Lee Yong-dae (KOR)	21	21
8	Chen Hung-ling (TPE); Lin Yu-lang (TPE)	21	12	13
2	Markis Kido (INA); Hendra Setiawan (INA)	17	21	21

Semifinals
3	Jung Jae-sung (KOR); Lee Yong-dae (KOR)	15	21	18
2	Markis Kido (INA); Hendra Setiawan (INA)	21	13	21
