= 2010 BWF Super Series Finals =

Tournament details
- Dates: 5 January 2011– 9 January 2011
- Total prize money: US$500,000
- Venue: Xinzhuang Gymnasium
- Location: New Taipei, Taiwan

Champions
- Men's singles: (Malaysia) Lee Chong Wei
- Women's singles: (China) Wang Shixian
- Men's doubles: (Denmark) Mathias Boe (Denmark) Carsten Mogensen
- Women's doubles: (China) Wang Xiaoli (China) Yu Yang
- Mixed doubles: (China) Zhang Nan (China) Zhao Yunlei

The 2010 BWF Super Series Finals was a top level badminton competition which was held from January 5, 2011 to January 9, 2011 in New Taipei City, Taiwan. The final was held by Chinese Taipei Badminton Association and sponsored by VICTOR. It was the final event of the BWF Super Series competition on the 2010 BWF Super Series schedule. The total purse for the event was $500,000.

== Representatives by nation ==
Top Nations
Rank	Nation	MS	WS	MD	WD	XD	Total	Players
1	China	2	2	2	2	1	9	12^{§}
2	Denmark	2	1	1	0	1	5	7
2	Thailand	1	1	0	1	2	5	7^{§}
4	Indonesia	1	0	1	1	1	4	7
5	South Korea	0	1	2	0	1	4	6^{§}
6	Chinese Taipei	0	0	1	1	0	2	4
6	Japan	0	0	0	2	0	2	4
8	Malaysia	1	0	1	0	0	2	3
9	England	0	0	0	0	1	1	2
9	Poland	0	0	0	0	1	1	2
11	Bulgaria	0	1	0	0,5	0	1,5	1^{§}
12	Hong Kong	0	1	0	0	0	1	1
12	Netherlands	0	1	0	0	0	1	1
12	Vietnam	1	0	0	0	0	1	1
15	Russia	0	0	0	0,5	0	0,5	0,5
Total		8	8	8	8	8	40	59

§: Petya Nedelcheva from Bulgaria was the only player who played in two categories (women's singles and women's doubles), Zhang Nan from China and Ko Sung-hyun from Korea were the players who played in two categories (men's doubles and mixed doubles), while Zhao Yunlei from China and Kunchala Voravichitchaikul from Thailand were the players who played in two categories (women's doubles and mixed doubles).

== Performance by nation ==
Nation	Group Phase	Semifinal	Final	Winner
China	9	8	4	3
Denmark	5	2	2	1
Thailand	5	3	1	
Indonesia	4			
South Korea	4	3	2	
Japan	2	1		
Malaysia	2	1	1	1
Chinese Taipei	2	1		
Bulgaria	1.5			
Vietnam	1			
Netherlands	1			
England	1			
Hong Kong	1	1		
Russia	0.5			
Poland	1			

== Men's singles ==
=== Seeding ===
1. (Malaysia) Lee Chong Wei
2. (China) Chen Long
3. (Thailand) Boonsak Ponsana
4. (Denmark) Peter Gade

=== Group A ===
Athlete	Pts	Pld	W	L	SF	SA	PF	PA
(Malaysia) Lee Chong Wei	3	3	3	0	6	0	126	86
(Denmark) Peter Gade	2	3	2	1	4	3	128	124
(Denmark) Jan Ø. Jørgensen	1	3	1	2	3	4	121	135
(Vietnam) Nguyen Tien Minh	0	3	0	3	0	6	96	126

Date		Score		Set 1	Set 2	Set 3
5 Jan	(Malaysia) Lee Chong Wei	2–0	(Vietnam) Nguyen Tien Minh	21–12	21–17	
5 Jan	(Denmark) Peter Gade	2–1	(Denmark) Jan Ø. Jørgensen	21–11	18–21	21–16
6 Jan	(Denmark) Peter Gade	2–0	(Vietnam) Nguyen Tien Minh	21–16	21–18	
6 Jan	(Malaysia) Lee Chong Wei	2–0	(Denmark) Jan Ø. Jørgensen	21–18	21–13	
7 Jan	(Malaysia) Lee Chong Wei	2–0	(Denmark) Peter Gade	21–14	21–12	
7 Jan	(Vietnam) Nguyen Tien Minh	0–2	(Denmark) Jan Ø. Jørgensen	18–21	15–21	

=== Group B ===
Athlete	Pts	Pld	W	L	SF	SA	PF	PA
(China) Chen Long	2	2	2	0	4	1	97	75
(Thailand) Boonsak Ponsana	1	2	1	1	2	3	83	93
(China) Du Pengyu	0	2	0	2	2	4	98	110
(Indonesia) Taufik Hidayat	0	0	0	0	0	0	0	0

Date		Score		Set 1	Set 2	Set 3
5 Jan	(Thailand) Boonsak Ponsana	2–1	(Indonesia) Taufik Hidayat	21–18	18–21	21–7
5 Jan	(China) Chen Long	2–1	(China) Du Pengyu	21–15	13–21	21–11
6 Jan	(China) Chen Long	2–0^{r}	(Indonesia) Taufik Hidayat	21–15	14–11^{r}	
6 Jan	(Thailand) Boonsak Ponsana	2–1	(China) Du Pengyu	13–21	21–11	21–19
7 Jan	(China) Chen Long	2–0	(Thailand) Boonsak Ponsana	21–11	21–17	
7 Jan	(Indonesia) Taufik Hidayat	walkover	(China) Du Pengyu			

=== Finals ===
Semifinals
(Malaysia) Lee Chong Wei	21	21
(Thailand) Boonsak Ponsana	17	18
(China) Chen Long	19	18
(Denmark) Peter Gade	21	21

Final
(Malaysia) Lee Chong Wei	21	21
(Denmark) Peter Gade	9	14

== Women's singles ==
=== Seeding ===
1. (China) Wang Shixian
2. (China) Wang Yihan
3. (South Korea) Bae Youn-joo
4. (Denmark) Tine Baun

=== Group A ===
Athlete	Pts	Pld	W	L	SF	SA	PF	PA
(China) Wang Shixian	3	3	3	0	6	0	126	67
(South Korea) Bae Youn-joo	2	3	2	1	4	3	131	120
(Thailand) Salakjit Ponsana	1	3	1	2	3	4	110	124
(Netherlands) Yao Jie	0	3	0	3	0	6	7	126

Date		Score		Set 1	Set 2	Set 3
5 Jan	(South Korea) Bae Youn-joo	2–1	(Thailand) Salakjit Ponsana	19–21	21–17	21–11
5 Jan	(China) Wang Shixian	2–0	(Netherlands) Yao Jie	21–14	21–6	
6 Jan	(China) Wang Shixian	2–0	(Thailand) Salakjit Ponsana	21–8	21–11	
6 Jan	(South Korea) Bae Youn-joo	2–0	(Netherlands) Yao Jie	21–16	21–13	
7 Jan	(China) Wang Shixian	2–0	(South Korea) Bae Youn-joo	21–18	21–10	
7 Jan	(Thailand) Salakjit Ponsana	2–0	(Netherlands) Yao Jie	21–16	21–5	

=== Group B ===
Athlete	Pts	Pld	W	L	SF	SA	PF	PA
(China) Wang Yihan	3	3	3	0	6	1	143	104
(Hong Kong) Yip Pui Yin	2	3	2	1	4	2	122	118
(Denmark) Tine Baun	1	3	1	2	3	4	131	125
(Bulgaria) Petya Nedelcheva	0	3	0	3	0	6	82	131

Date		Score		Set 1	Set 2	Set 3
5 Jan	(Denmark) Tine Baun	0–2	(Hong Kong) Yip Pui Yin	18–21	20–22	
5 Jan	(China) Wang Yihan	2–0	(Bulgaria) Petya Nedelcheva	21–7	21–14	
6 Jan	(China) Wang Yihan	2–0	(Hong Kong) Yip Pui Yin	21–15	21–17	
6 Jan	(Denmark) Tine Baun	2–0	(Bulgaria) Petya Nedelcheva	21–6	21–17	
7 Jan	(China) Wang Yihan	2–1	(Denmark) Tine Baun	17–21	21–17	21–13
7 Jan	(Hong Kong) Yip Pui Yin	2–0	(Bulgaria) Petya Nedelcheva	26–24	21–14	

=== Finals ===
Semifinals
(China) Wang Shixian	21	21
(Hong Kong) Yip Pui Yin	15	14
(China) Wang Yihan	18	21	16
(South Korea) Bae Youn-joo	21	16	21

Final
(China) Wang Shixian	21	21
(South Korea) Bae Youn-joo	13	15

== Men's doubles ==
=== Seeding ===
1. (Denmark) Carsten Mogensen/ Mathias Boe
2. (South Korea) Ko Sung-hyun/ Yoo Yeon-seong
3. (South Korea) Jung Jae-sung/ Lee Yong-dae
4. (Malaysia) Tan Boon Heong/ Koo Kien Keat

=== Group A ===
Athlete	Pts	Pld	W	L	SF	SA	PF	PA
(China) Fu Haifeng/ Cai Yun	2	2	2	0	4	1	102	88
(China) Chai Biao/ Zhang Nan	1	2	1	1	3	3	116	118
(South Korea) Ko Sung-hyun/ Yoo Yeon-seong	0	2	0	2	1	4	87	99
(Malaysia) Tan Boon Heong/ Koo Kien Keat	0	0	0	0	0	0	0	0

Date		Score		Set 1	Set 2	Set 3
5 Jan	(South Korea) Ko Sung-hyun/ Yoo Yeon-seong	2–0	(Malaysia) Tan Boon Heong/ Koo Kien Keat	21–15	22–20	
5 Jan	(China) Chai Biao/ Zhang Nan	1–2	(China) Fu Haifeng/ Cai Yun	21–23	21–16	17–21
6 Jan	(Malaysia) Tan Boon Heong/ Koo Kien Keat	1–2	(China) Chai Biao/ Zhang Nan	21–14	15–21	17–21
6 Jan	(South Korea) Ko Sung-hyun/ Yoo Yeon-seong	0–2	(China) Fu Haifeng/ Cai Yun	14–21	15–21	
7 Jan	(South Korea) Ko Sung-hyun/ Yoo Yeon-seong	1–2	(China) Chai Biao/ Zhang Nan	19–21	21–15	18–21
7 Jan	(Malaysia) Tan Boon Heong/ Koo Kien Keat	walkover	(China) Fu Haifeng/ Cai Yun			

=== Group B ===
Athlete	Pts	Pld	W	L	SF	SA	PF	PA
(South Korea) Jung Jae-sung/ Lee Yong-dae	2	2	2	0	4	0	84	66
(Denmark) Carsten Mogensen/ Mathias Boe	1	2	1	1	2	2	77	78
(Chinese Taipei) Fang Chieh-Min/ Lee Sheng-mu	0	2	0	2	0	4	69	86
(Indonesia) Hendra Setiawan/ Markis Kido	0	0	0	0	0	0	0	0

Date		Score		Set 1	Set 2	Set 3
5 Jan	(South Korea) Jung Jae-sung/ Lee Yong-dae	2–0	(Chinese Taipei) Fang Chieh-Min/ Lee Sheng-mu	21–16	21–17	
5 Jan	(Denmark) Carsten Mogensen/ Mathias Boe	2–0	(Indonesia) Hendra Setiawan/ Markis Kido	21–12	23–21	
6 Jan	(Denmark) Carsten Mogensen/ Mathias Boe	2–0	(Chinese Taipei) Fang Chieh-Min/ Lee Sheng-mu	21–15	23–21	
6 Jan	(South Korea) Jung Jae-sung/ Lee Yong-dae	retired	(Indonesia) Hendra Setiawan/ Markis Kido	8–3		
7 Jan	(Denmark) Carsten Mogensen/ Mathias Boe	0–2	(South Korea) Jung Jae-sung/ Lee Yong-dae	18–21	15–21	
7 Jan	(Chinese Taipei) Fang Chieh-Min/ Lee Sheng-mu	walkover	(Indonesia) Hendra Setiawan/ Markis Kido			

=== Finals ===
Semifinals
(China) Fu Haifeng (China) Cai Yun	10	21	19
(Denmark) Carsten Mogensen (Denmark) Mathias Boe	21	18	21
(South Korea) Jung Jae-sung (South Korea) Lee Yong-dae	21	21
(China) Chai Biao (China) Zhang Nan	15	11

Final
(Denmark) Carsten Mogensen (Denmark) Mathias Boe	21	21
(South Korea) Jung Jae-sung (South Korea) Lee Yong-dae	17	15

== Women's doubles ==
=== Seeding ===
1. (Chinese Taipei) Cheng Wen-hsing/ Chien Yu-chin
2. (China) Cheng Shu/ Zhao Yunlei
3. (Russia) Anastasia Russkikh/ (Bulgaria) Petya Nedelcheva
4. (Thailand) Duanganong Aroonkesorn/ Kunchala Voravichitchaikul

=== Group A ===
Athlete	Pts	Pld	W	L	SF	SA	PF	PA
(Chinese Taipei) Cheng Wen-hsing/ Chien Yu-chin	3	3	3	0	6	1	149	111
(Japan) Miyuki Maeda/ Satoko Suetsuna	2	3	2	1	4	2	117	100
(Indonesia) Greysia Polii/ Meiliana Jauhari	1	3	1	2	2	4	97	116
(Russia) Anastasia Russkikh/ (Bulgaria) Petya Nedelcheva	0	3	0	3	1	6	113	149

Date		Score		Set 1	Set 2	Set 3
5 Jan	(Russia) Anastasia Russkikh/ (Bulgaria) Petya Nedelcheva	0–2	(Japan) Miyuki Maeda/ Satoko Suetsuna	19–21	12–21	
5 Jan	(Chinese Taipei) Cheng Wen-hsing/ Chien Yu-chin	2–0	(Indonesia) Greysia Polii/ Meiliana Jauhari	21–13	21–15	
6 Jan	(Chinese Taipei) Cheng Wen-hsing/ Chien Yu-chin	2–0	(Japan) Miyuki Maeda/ Satoko Suetsuna	21–15	21–18	
6 Jan	(Russia) Anastasia Russkikh/ (Bulgaria) Petya Nedelcheva	0–2	(Indonesia) Greysia Polii/ Meiliana Jauhari	18–21	14–21	
7 Jan	(Chinese Taipei) Cheng Wen-hsing/ Chien Yu-chin	2–1	(Russia) Anastasia Russkikh/ (Bulgaria) Petya Nedelcheva	23–25	21–13	21–12
7 Jan	(Japan) Miyuki Maeda/ Satoko Suetsuna	2–0	(Indonesia) Greysia Polii/ Meiliana Jauhari	21–12	21–15	

=== Group B ===
Athlete	Pts	Pld	W	L	SF	SA	PF	PA
(China) Wang Xiaoli/ Yu Yang	3	3	3	0	6	1	144	98
(China) Cheng Shu/ Zhao Yunlei	2	3	2	1	5	2	137	108
(Japan) Mizuki Fujii/ Reika Kakiiwa	1	3	1	2	2	4	93	111
(Thailand) Duanganong Aroonkesorn/ Kunchala Voravichitchaikul	0	3	0	3	0	6	69	126

Date		Score		Set 1	Set 2	Set 3
5 Jan	(China) Cheng Shu/ Zhao Yunlei	1–2	(China) Wang Xiaoli/ Yu Yang	21–18	18–21	14–21
5 Jan	(Thailand) Duanganong Aroonkesorn/ Kunchala Voravichitchaikul	0–2	(Japan) Mizuki Fujii/ Reika Kakiiwa	13–21	14–21	
6 Jan	(Thailand) Duanganong Aroonkesorn/ Kunchala Voravichitchaikul	0–2	(China) Wang Xiaoli/ Yu Yang	10–21	9–21	
6 Jan	(China) Cheng Shu/ Zhao Yunlei	2–0	(Japan) Mizuki Fujii/ Reika Kakiiwa	21–15	21–10	
7 Jan	(China) Cheng Shu/ Zhao Yunlei	2–0	(Thailand) Duanganong Aroonkesorn/ Kunchala Voravichitchaikul	21–11	21–12	
7 Jan	(China) Wang Xiaoli/ Yu Yang	2–0	(Japan) Mizuki Fujii/ Reika Kakiiwa	21–14	21–12	

=== Finals ===
Semifinals
(Chinese Taipei) Cheng Wen-hsing (Chinese Taipei) Chien Yu-chin	20	19
(China) Cheng Shu (China) Zhao Yunlei	22	21
(China) Wang Xiaoli (China) Yu Yang	21	21
(Japan) Miyuki Maeda (Japan) Satoko Suetsuna	16	16

Final
(China) Cheng Shu (China) Zhao Yunlei	7	17
(China) Wang Xiaoli (China) Yu Yang	21	21

== Mixed doubles ==
=== Seeding ===
1. (Denmark) Thomas Laybourn/ Kamilla Rytter Juhl
2. (Thailand) Sudket Prapakamol/ Saralee Thungthongkam
3. (Poland) Robert Mateusiak/ Nadieżda Kostiuczyk
4. (China) Zhang Nan/ Zhao Yunlei

=== Group A ===
Athlete	Pts	Pld	W	L	SF	SA	PF	PA
(Thailand) Songphon Anugritayawon/ Kunchala Voravichitchaikul	2	2	2	0	4	2	116	109
(China) Zhang Nan/ Zhao Yunlei	1	2	1	1	3	2	97	89
(England) Nathan Robertson/ Jenny Wallwork	0	2	0	2	1	4	83	98
(Denmark) Thomas Laybourn/ Kamilla Rytter Juhl	0	0	0	0	0	0	0	0

Date		Score		Set 1	Set 2	Set 3
5 Jan	(China) Zhang Nan/ Zhao Yunlei	1–2	(Thailand) Songphon Anugritayawon/ Kunchala Voravichitchaikul	20–22	21–17	14–21
5 Jan	(Denmark) Thomas Laybourn/ Kamilla Rytter Juhl	2–1	(England) Nathan Robertson/ Jenny Wallwork	21–11	18–21	21–14
6 Jan	(Denmark) Thomas Laybourn/ Kamilla Rytter Juhl	walkover	(Thailand) Songphon Anugritayawon/ Kunchala Voravichitchaikul			
6 Jan	(China) Zhang Nan/ Zhao Yunlei	2–0	(England) Nathan Robertson/ Jenny Wallwork	21–15	21–14	
7 Jan	(Denmark) Thomas Laybourn/ Kamilla Rytter Juhl	walkover	(China) Zhang Nan/ Zhao Yunlei			
7 Jan	(Thailand) Songphon Anugritayawon/ Kunchala Voravichitchaikul	2–1	(England) Nathan Robertson/ Jenny Wallwork	21–16	14–21	21–17

=== Group B ===
Athlete	Pts	Pld	W	L	SF	SA	PF	PA
(South Korea) Ha Jung-eun/ Ko Sung-hyun	2	3	2	1	5	2	132	138
(Thailand) Sudket Prapakamol/ Saralee Thungthongkam	2	3	2	1	5	3	154	137
(Indonesia) Vita Marissa/ Hendra Aprida Gunawan	2	3	2	1	4	4	163	154
(Poland) Robert Mateusiak/ Nadieżda Kostiuczyk	0	3	0	3	1	6	127	147

Date		Score		Set 1	Set 2	Set 3
5 Jan	(Poland) Robert Mateusiak/ Nadieżda Kostiuczyk	0–2	(South Korea) Ha Jung-eun/ Ko Sung-hyun	18–21	18–21	
5 Jan	(Thailand) Sudket Prapakamol/ Saralee Thungthongkam	1–2	(Indonesia) Vita Marissa/ Hendra Aprida Gunawan	21–16	10–21	20–22
6 Jan	(Thailand) Sudket Prapakamol/ Saralee Thungthongkam	2–1	(South Korea) Ha Jung-eun/ Ko Sung-hyun	18–21	21–13	21–10
6 Jan	(Poland) Robert Mateusiak/ Nadieżda Kostiuczyk	1–2	(Indonesia) Vita Marissa/ Hendra Aprida Gunawan	14–21	21–17	22–24
7 Jan	(Thailand) Sudket Prapakamol/ Saralee Thungthongkam	2–0	(Poland) Robert Mateusiak/ Nadieżda Kostiuczyk	22–20	21–14	
7 Jan	(South Korea) Ha Jung-eun/ Ko Sung-hyun	2–0	(Indonesia) Vita Marissa/ Hendra Aprida Gunawan	22–20	24–22	

=== Finals ===
Semifinals
(Thailand) Songphon Anugritayawon (Thailand) Kunchala Voravichitchaikul	13	16
(Thailand) Sudket Prapakamol (Thailand) Saralee Thungthongkam	21	21
(South Korea) Ha Jung-eun (South Korea) Ko Sung-hyun	14	19
(China) Zhang Nan (China) Zhao Yunlei	21	21

Final
(Thailand) Sudket Prapakamol (Thailand) Saralee Thungthongkam	17	12
(China) Zhang Nan (China) Zhao Yunlei	21	21

== See also ==
- List of sporting events in Taiwan

Preceded by 2009 BWF Super Series Masters Finals	BWF Super Series Finals	Succeeded by 2011 BWF Super Series Finals
Preceded by 2010 Hong Kong Super Series	2010 BWF Super Series	Succeeded by 2011 Malaysia Super Series
