= 2010 BWF World Championships – Men's doubles =

Men's doubles at the 2010 BWF World Championships
- Venue: Stade Pierre de Coubertin
- Location: Paris, France
- Dates: August 23, 2010 – August 29, 2010

Medalists
gold medal	Cai Yun; Fu Haifeng	China
silver medal	Koo Kien Keat; Tan Boon Heong	Malaysia
bronze medal	Guo Zhendong; Xu Chen	China
bronze medal	Markis Kido; Hendra Setiawan	Indonesia

The 2010 BWF World Championships was the 18th tournament of the World Badminton Championships. It was held at Stade Pierre de Coubertin in Paris, France, from August 23 to August 29, 2010. Following the results of the men's doubles.

== Seeds ==
1. (Malaysia) Koo Kien Keat / Tan Boon Heong (finalists)
2. (Indonesia) Markis Kido / Hendra Setiawan (semifinals)
3. (Denmark) Mathias Boe / Carsten Mogensen (quarterfinals)
4. (China) Guo Zhendong / Xu Chen (semifinals)
5. (China) Cai Yun / Fu Haifeng (champions)
6. (Chinese Taipei) Fang Chieh-min / Lee Sheng-mu(quarterfinals)
7. (South Korea) Jung Jae-sung / Lee Yong-dae(quarterfinals)
8. (Denmark) Lars Paaske / Jonas Rasmussen (quarterfinals)
9. (Indonesia) Alvent Yulianto / Hendra Aprida Gunawan (second round)
10. (United States) Howard Bach / Tony Gunawan (first round)
11. (Japan) Hirokatsu Hashimoto / Noriyasu Hirata (third round)
12. (Chinese Taipei) Chen Hung-ling / Lin Yu-lang (third round)
13. (South Korea) Ko Sung-hyun / Yoo Yeon-seong (third round)
14. (China) Chai Biao / Zhang Nan (third round)
15. (India) Rupesh Kumar / Sanave Thomas (third round)
16. (Malaysia) Choong Tan Fook / Lee Wan Wah (first round)

== Main stage ==
=== Section 1 ===
First round
14	(China) Chai B (China) Zhang N
(Thailand) B Issara (Thailand) M Jongjit	wo
(Russia) V Ivanov (Russia) I Sozonov	12	17
(Netherlands) R Bosch (Netherlands) K Ridder	21	21
9	(Indonesia) A Yulianto (Indonesia) HA Gunawan
(Wales) J Morgan (Wales) J Phillips	wo
(Singapore) HK Saputra (Singapore) H Wijaya	21	21
(Germany) M Fuchs (Germany) I Kindervater	19	18

Second round
1	(Malaysia) Koo KK (Malaysia) Tan BH	21	21
(Czech Republic) O Kopriva (Czech Republic) T Kopriva	15	13
14	(China) Chai B (China) Zhang N	21	21
(Netherlands) R Bosch (Netherlands) K Ridder	16	13
7	(South Korea) Jung J-s (South Korea) Lee Y-d	21	21
(United States) M Fogarty (United States) D Neumann	13	4
9	(Indonesia) A Yulianto (Indonesia) HA Gunawan	15	15
(Singapore) HK Saputra (Singapore) H Wijaya	21	21

Third round
1	(Malaysia) Koo KK (Malaysia) Tan BH	21	21
14	(China) Chai B (China) Zhang N	17	17
7	(South Korea) Jung J-s (South Korea) Lee Y-d	21	21
(Singapore) HK Saputra (Singapore) H Wijaya	14	8

Quarterfinals
1	(Malaysia) Koo KK (Malaysia) Tan BH	23	21	21
7	(South Korea) Jung J-s (South Korea) Lee Y-d	25	13	14

=== Section 2 ===
First round
12	(Chinese Taipei) Chen H-l (Chinese Taipei) Lin Y-l	17	23	21
(Japan) N Kawamae (Japan) S Sato	21	21	16
(Australia) S Gunaratne (Australia) C Whitehead	15	15
(France) L Constantin (France) S Vincent	21	21
15	(India) R Kumar (India) S Thomas	21	21
(Nigeria) O Fagbemi (Nigeria) J Ifraimu	18	10
(France) L Corvee (France) J Grosjean	19	15
(South Africa) D James (South Africa) W Viljoen	21	21

Second round
4	(China) Guo ZD (China) Xu C	24	21
(England) C Langridge (England) R Middleton	22	15
12	(Chinese Taipei) Chen H-l (Chinese Taipei) Lin Y-l	22	21
(France) L Constantin (France) S Vincent	20	10
8	(Denmark) L Paaske (Denmark) J Rasmussen	21	21
(Austria) D Grassmück (Austria) R Zirnwald	12	11
15	(India) R Kumar (India) S Thomas	21	21
(South Africa) D James (South Africa) W Viljoen	14	16

Third round
4	(China) Guo ZD (China) Xu C	21	21	21
12	(Chinese Taipei) Chen H-l (Chinese Taipei) Lin Y-l	23	18	18
8	(Denmark) L Paaske (Denmark) J Rasmussen	21	21
15	(India) R Kumar (India) S Thomas	16	16

Quarterfinals
4	(China) Guo ZD (China) Xu C	21	23
8	(Denmark) L Paaske (Denmark) J Rasmussen	16	21

=== Section 3 ===
First round
(Republic of Ireland) S Magee (Republic of Ireland) T Stephenson	18	17
(Ukraine) V Konov (Ukraine) D Zavadsky	21	21
(England) A Clark (England) N Robertson	21	22
10	(United States) H Bach (United States) T Gunawan	9	20
(Austria) J Koch (Austria) P Zauner	21	21
(Guatemala) K Cordón (Guatemala) R Ramirez	17	16
(Thailand) S Anugritayawon (Thailand) S Prapakamol	14	13
13	(South Korea) Ko S-h (South Korea) Yoo Y-s	21	21

Second round
(Ukraine) V Konov (Ukraine) D Zavadsky	11	9
(England) A Clark (England) N Robertson	21	21
(Croatia) Z Durkinjak (Croatia) Z Hoelbling	11	13
5	(China) Cai Y (China) Fu HF	21	21
(Austria) J Koch (Austria) P Zauner	11	15
13	(South Korea) Ko S-h (South Korea) Yoo Y-s	21	21
(Denmark) K Faust Henriksen (Denmark) A Kristiansen	16	19
3	(Denmark) M Boe (Denmark) C Mogensen	21	21

Third round
(England) A Clark (England) N Robertson	6	9
5	(China) Cai Y (China) Fu HF	21	21
13	(South Korea) Ko S-h (South Korea) Yoo Y-s	13	16
3	(Denmark) M Boe (Denmark) C Mogensen	21	21

Quarterfinals
5	(China) Cai Y (China) Fu HF	21	21
3	(Denmark) M Boe (Denmark) C Mogensen	11	18

=== Section 4 ===
First round
(Russia) V Durkin (Russia) A Nikolaenko	19	14
(Malaysia) Gan TC (Malaysia) Tan BS	21	21
(Hong Kong) YH Wiratama (Hong Kong) Wong WH	13	15
11	(Japan) H Hashimoto (Japan) N Hirata	21	21
(France) B Careme (France) S Grosjean	19	21
(Indonesia) YS Dasuki (Indonesia) R Sukmawan	21	23
(Germany) K Hopp (Germany) J Schöttler	22	17	21
16	(Malaysia) Choong TF (Malaysia) Lee WW	20	21	18

Second round
(Malaysia) Gan TC (Malaysia) Tan BS	21	17	19
11	(Japan) H Hashimoto (Japan) N Hirata	19	21	21
(Netherlands) D Khodabux (Netherlands) J de Ruiter	13	13
6	(Chinese Taipei) Fang C-m (Chinese Taipei) Lee S-m	21	21
(Indonesia) YS Dasuki (Indonesia) R Sukmawan	21	21	21
(Germany) K Hopp (Germany) J Schöttler	14	23	18
(Poland) A Cwalina (Poland) M Logosz	21	17
2	(Indonesia) M Kido (Indonesia) H Setiawan	23	21

Third round
11	(Japan) H Hashimoto (Japan) N Hirata	19	12
6	(Chinese Taipei) Fang C-m (Chinese Taipei) Lee S-m	21	21
(Indonesia) YS Dasuki (Indonesia) R Sukmawan	12	9
2	(Indonesia) M Kido (Indonesia) H Setiawan	21	21

Quarterfinals
6	(Chinese Taipei) Fang C-m (Chinese Taipei) Lee S-m	14	14
2	(Indonesia) M Kido (Indonesia) H Setiawan	21	21

== Final stage ==
Quarterfinals
1	(Malaysia) Koo Kien Keat (Malaysia) Tan Boon Heong	23	21	21
7	(South Korea) Jung Jae-sung (South Korea) Lee Yong-dae	25	13	14
4	(China) Guo Zhendong (China) Xu Chen	21	23
8	(Denmark) Lars Paaske (Denmark) Jonas Rasmussen	16	21
5	(China) Cai Yun (China) Fu Haifeng	21	21
3	(Denmark) Mathias Boe (Denmark) Carsten Mogensen	11	18
6	(Chinese Taipei) Fang Chieh-min (Chinese Taipei) Lee Sheng-mu	14	14
2	(Indonesia) Markis Kido (Indonesia) Hendra Setiawan	21	21

Semifinals
1	(Malaysia) Koo Kien Keat (Malaysia) Tan Boon Heong	21	21
4	(China) Guo Zhendong (China) Xu Chen	14	18
5	(China) Cai Yun (China) Fu Haifeng	21	21
2	(Indonesia) Markis Kido (Indonesia) Hendra Setiawan	16	13

Finals
1	(Malaysia) Koo Kien Keat (Malaysia) Tan Boon Heong	21	18	14
5	(China) Cai Yun (China) Fu Haifeng	18	21	21
