= 2009 BWF World Championships – Men's doubles =

Men's doubles at the 2009 BWF World Championships
- Venue: Gachibowli Indoor Stadium
- Location: Hyderabad, India
- Dates: August 10, 2009 – August 16, 2009

Medalists
gold medal	Fu Haifeng; Cai Yun	China
silver medal	Jung Jae-sung; Lee Yong-dae	South Korea
bronze medal	Mohd Zakry Abdul Latif; Mohd Fairuzizuan Tazari	Malaysia
bronze medal	Koo Kien Keat; Tan Boon Heong	Malaysia

The 2009 BWF World Championships was the 17th tournament of the World Badminton Championships. It was held at the Gachibowli Indoor Stadium in Hyderabad, Andhra Pradesh, India, from 10 to 16 August, 2009. Following the results of the men's doubles.

== Seeds ==
1. (Indonesia) Markis Kido / Hendra Setiawan (withdrew)
2. (Malaysia) Koo Kien Keat / Tan Boon Heong (semi-final)
3. (Denmark) Lars Paaske / Jonas Rasmussen (second round)
4. (South Korea) Jung Jae-sung / Lee Yong-dae (final)
5. (China) Cai Yun / Fu Haifeng (champion)
6. (Denmark) Mathias Boe / Carsten Mogensen (third round)
7. (Indonesia) Mohammad Ahsan / Bona Septano (second round)
8. (Malaysia) Mohd Zakry Abdul Latif / Mohd Fairuzizuan Mohd Tazari (semi-final)
9. (England) Anthony Clark / Nathan Robertson (withdrew)
10. (Poland) Michal Logosz / Robert Mateusiak (third round)
11. (Indonesia) Yonathan Suryatama Dasuki / Rian Sukmawan (third round)
12. (Malaysia) Choong Tan Fook / Lee Wan Wah (first round)
13. (Chinese Taipei) Chen Hung-ling / Lin Yu-lang (second round)
14. (Japan) Kenichi Hayakawa / Kenta Kazuno (second round)
15. (Chinese Taipei) Fang Chieh-min / Lee Sheng-mu (third round)
16. (Russia) Vitalij Durkin / Alexandr Nikolaenko (third round)

== Main stage ==
=== Section 1 ===
First round
14	(Japan) K Hayakawa (Japan) K Kazuno	21	23
(India) R Kumar (India) S Thomas	13	21
(South Korea) Cho G-w (South Korea) Yoo Y-s	21	21
(United States) M Fogarty (United States) D Schoppe	5	9
11	(Indonesia) YS Dasuki (Indonesia) R Sukmawan	25	21
(China) Chai B (China) Liu XL	23	17
(Russia) V Ivanov (Russia) I Sozonov	21	20	19
(Ukraine) V Atrashchenkov (Russia) G Natarov	17	22	21

Second round
1	(Indonesia) M Kido (Indonesia) H Setiawan	wo
(Chinese Taipei) Hu C-s (Chinese Taipei) Tsai C-h
14	(Japan) K Hayakawa (Japan) K Kazuno	17	16
(South Korea) Cho G-w (South Korea) Yoo Y-s	21	21
8	(Malaysia) MZ Abdul Latif (Malaysia) MFM Tazari	21	23
(Japan) Y Hirobe (Japan) H Komiyama	14	21
11	(Indonesia) YS Dasuki (Indonesia) R Sukmawan	21	21
(Ukraine) V Atrashchenkov (Ukraine) G Natarov	6	6

Third round
(Chinese Taipei) Hu C-s (Chinese Taipei) Tsai C-h	21	8	19
(South Korea) Cho G-w (South Korea) Yoo Y-s	16	21	21
8	(Malaysia) MZ Abdul Latif (Malaysia) MFM Tazari	21	21
11	(Indonesia) YS Dasuki (Indonesia) R Sukmawan	14	17

Quarterfinals
(South Korea) Cho G-w (South Korea) Yoo Y-s	21	12	14
8	(Malaysia) MZ Abdul Latif (Malaysia) MFM Tazari	17	21	21

=== Section 2 ===
First round
10	(Poland) M Łogosz (Poland) R Mateusiak
(England) R Eidestedt (England) A Ellis	wo
(Canada) W Milroy (Canada) T Ng	21	16	21
(Belgium) W Claes (Belgium) F Mawet	12	21	19
(Singapore) HK Saputra (Singapore) H Wijaya	21	19	21
(Netherlands) R Bosch (Netherlands) K Ridder	15	21	16
15	(Chinese Taipei) Fang C-m (Chinese Taipei) Lee S-m	15	21	21
(Switzerland) C Bösiger (Switzerland) A Dumartheray	21	11	15
(France) B Careme (France) R Labar	8	16
(Germany) M Fuchs (Germany) I Kindervater	21	21

Second round
3	(Denmark) L Passke (Denmark) J Rasmussen	19	21	17
(South Korea) Han S-h (South Korea) Shin B-c	21	15	21
10	(Poland) M Łogosz (Poland) R Mateusiak	21	21
(Canada) W Milroy (Canada) T Ng	14	14
5	(China) Cai Y (China) Fu HF	21	21
(Singapore) HK Saputra (Singapore) H Wijaya	12	16
15	(Chinese Taipei) Fang C-m (Chinese Taipei) Lee S-m	23	21
(Germany) M Fuchs (Germany) I Kindervater	21	14

Third round
(South Korea) Han S-h (South Korea) Shin B-c	21	21
10	(Poland) M Łogosz (Poland) R Mateusiak	17	12
5	(China) Cai Y (China) Fu HF	21	21
15	(Chinese Taipei) Fang C-m (Chinese Taipei) Lee S-m	6	14

Quarterfinals
(South Korea) Han S-h (South Korea) Shin B-c	16	18
5	(China) Cai Y (China) Fu HF	21	21

=== Section 3 ===
First round
(India) A Dewalkar (India) J Sanyal
(Thailand) P Chalardchaleam (Thailand) N Narkthong	wo
(Netherlands) J de Ruiter (Netherlands) J Wouters	wo
16	(Russia) V Durkin (Russia) A Nikolaenko
(Hong Kong) YH Wiratama (Hong Kong) Wong WH	16	19
(China) Xu C (China) Guo ZD	21	21
(China) He HB (China) Shen Y	21	21
(Ukraine) V Konov (Ukraine) D Zavadsky	15	10
(Germany) K Hopp (Germany) J Schöttler
9	(England) A Clark (England) N Robertson	wo

Second round
(India) A Dewalkar (India) J Sanyal	21	13	18
16	(Russia) V Durkin (Russia) A Nikolaenko	17	21	21
(China) Xu C (China) Guo ZD	22	21	21
7	(Indonesia) M Ahsan (Indonesia) B Septano	24	10	9
(China) He HB (China) Shen Y	24	21	21
(Germany) K Hopp (Germany) J Schöttler	26	16	17
(Canada) A Liu (Canada) D Ng	8	12
4	(South Korea) Jung J-s (South Korea) Lee Y-d	21	21

Third round
16	(Russia) V Durkin (Russia) A Nikolaenko	17	19
(China) Xu C (China) Guo ZD	21	21
(China) He HB (China) Shen Y	11	15
4	(South Korea) Jung J-s (South Korea) Lee Y-d	21	21

Quarterfinals
(China) Xu C (China) Guo ZD	17	26
4	(South Korea) Jung J-s (South Korea) Lee Y-d	21	28

=== Section 4 ===
First round
(Bulgaria) V Metodiev (Bulgaria) K Yankov	wo
(Japan) S Ikeda (Japan) S Sakamoto
(United States) H Bach (United States) T Gunawan	21	18	23
12	(Malaysia) Choong TF (Malaysia) Lee WW	15	21	21
(Japan) N Kawamae (Japan) S Sato	18	21	21
(Malaysia) Chan CM (Malaysia) Chew CE	21	15	16
(India) T Kona (India) A Vishnu	12	14
13	(Chinese Taipei) Chen H-l (Chinese Taipei) Lin Y-l	21	21

Second round
(Japan) S Ikeda (Japan) S Sakamoto	10	9
(United States) H Bach (United States) T Gunawan	21	21
(Austria) J Koch (Austria) P Zauner	wo
6	(Denmark) M Boe (Denmark) C Mogensen
(Japan) N Kawamae (Japan) S Sato	21	22
13	(Chinese Taipei) Chen H-l (Chinese Taipei) Lin Y-l	17	20
(Nigeria) O Fagbemi (Nigeria) J Ifraimu	5	16
2	(Malaysia) Koo KK (Malaysia) Tan BH	21	21

Third round
(United States) H Bach (United States) T Gunawan	21	21
6	(Denmark) M Boe (Denmark) C Mogensen	18	18
(Japan) N Kawamae (Japan) S Sato	14	17
2	(Malaysia) Koo KK (Malaysia) Tan BH	21	21

Quarterfinals
(United States) H Bach (United States) T Gunawan	20	21	17
2	(Malaysia) Koo KK (Malaysia) Tan BH	22	13	21

== Final stage ==
Quarter-finals
(South Korea) Cho Gun-woo (South Korea) Yoo Yeon-seong	21	12	14
8	(Malaysia) Zakry Abdul Latif (Malaysia) Fairuzizuan Tazari	17	21	21
(South Korea) Han Sang-hoon (South Korea) Shin Baek-cheol	16	18
5	(China) Cai Yun (China) Fu Haifeng	21	21
(China) Xu Chen (China) Guo Zhendong	17	26
4	(South Korea) Jung Jae-sung (South Korea) Lee Yong-dae	21	28
(United States) Howard Bach (United States) Tony Gunawan	20	21	17
2	(Malaysia) Koo Kien Keat (Malaysia) Tan Boon Heong	22	13	21

Semi-finals
8	(Malaysia) Zakry Abdul Latif (Malaysia) Fairuzizuan Tazari	21	22	15
5	(China) Cai Yun (China) Fu Haifeng	18	24	21
4	(South Korea) Jung Jae-sung (South Korea) Lee Yong-dae	16	21	22
2	(Malaysia) Koo Kien Keat (Malaysia) Tan Boon Heong	21	14	20

Final
5	(China) Cai Yun (China) Fu Haifeng	21	16	28
4	(South Korea) Jung Jae-sung (South Korea) Lee Yong-dae	18	21	26
