= Rian Sukmawan =

Indonesian badminton player

Personal information
- Born: 21 November 1985 Semarang, Central Java, Indonesia
- Died: 27 February 2016 (aged 30) Semarang, Central Java, Indonesia

Sport
- Country: Indonesia
- Sport: Badminton
- Handedness: Right

Men's doubles
- Highest ranking: 8 (with Eng Hian 1 February 2007)
- BWF profile
Medal record
Men's badminton
Representing Indonesia
Sudirman Cup
Bronze medal – third place	2009 Guangzhou	Mixed team
World Junior Championships
Bronze medal – third place	2002 Pretoria	Mixed team
Asian Junior Championships
Gold medal – first place	2002 Kuala Lumpur	Boys' team
Bronze medal – third place	2002 Kuala Lumpur	Boys' doubles

Rian Sukmawan (21 November 1985 – 27 February 2016) was a professional badminton player from Indonesia.

== Career ==
Sukmawan was a doubles specialist. In 2006, he won the men's doubles at the Dutch and New Zealand Opens with fellow countryman Eng Hian. In 2007, he won the Dutch Open again with partner Yonathan Suryatama Dasuki.

== Death ==
Rian Sukmawan died on 27 February 2016 of a heart attack after playing in an exhibition match in Semarang with some former players, including Tri Kusharjanto. According to Kusharjanto, Sukmawan went outside for some rest before a security guard found him laying on a bench outside the arena alone and asking for help. He was rushed to hospital, but was declared dead on arrival.

== Achievements ==
=== Asian Junior Championships ===
Boys' doubles
Year	Venue	Partner	Opponent	Score	Result
2002	Kuala Lumpur Badminton Stadium; Kuala Lumpur, Malaysia	(Indonesia) Markis Kido	(Malaysia) Koo Kien Keat (Malaysia) Ong Soon Hock	15–17, 11–15	Bronze

=== BWF Superseries ===
The BWF Superseries, launched on 14 December 2006 and implemented in 2007, is a series of elite badminton tournaments, sanctioned by Badminton World Federation (BWF). BWF Superseries has two level such as Superseries and Superseries Premier. A season of Superseries features twelve tournaments around the world, which introduced since 2011, with successful players invited to the Superseries Finals held at the year end.

Men's doubles
Year	Tournament	Partner	Opponent	Score	Result
2009	Japan Open	(Indonesia) Yonatan Suryatama Dasuki	(Indonesia) Markis Kido (Indonesia) Hendra Setiawan	19–21, 22–24	(silver) Runner-up

BWF Super Series Finals tournament
BWF Super Series Premier tournament
BWF Super Series tournament

=== BWF Grand Prix ===
The BWF Grand Prix has two levels, the BWF Grand Prix and Grand Prix Gold. It is a series of badminton tournaments sanctioned by the Badminton World Federation (BWF) since 2007. The World Badminton Grand Prix sanctioned by International Badminton Federation (IBF) since 1983.

Men's doubles
Year	Tournament	Partner	Opponent	Score	Result
2006	New Zealand Open	(Indonesia) Eng Hian	(Singapore) Hendri Kurniawan Saputra (Singapore) Hendra Wijaya	21–13, 11–9 retired	(gold) Winner
2006	Dutch Open	(Indonesia) Eng Hian	(Indonesia) Hendra Aprida Gunawan (Indonesia) Joko Riyadi	21–15, 21–10	(gold) Winner
2007	Dutch Open	(Indonesia) Yonatan Suryatama Dasuki	(Indonesia) Fran Kurniawan (Indonesia) Rendra Wijaya	21–13, 21–12	(gold) Winner
2010	Indonesia Grand Prix Gold	(Indonesia) Yonatan Suryatama Dasuki	(Indonesia) Mohammad Ahsan (Indonesia) Bona Septano	16–21, 17–18 retired	(silver) Runner-up

BWF Grand Prix Gold tournament
BWF Grand Prix tournament

=== BWF International Challenge/Series ===
Men's doubles
Year	Tournament	Partner	Opponent	Score	Result
2004	Vietnam Satellite	(Indonesia) Yoga Ukikasah	(South Korea) Hwang Ji-man (South Korea) Jung Jae-sung	17–15, 15–7	(gold) Winner
2006	Surabaya Satellite	(Indonesia) Ade Lukas	(Indonesia) Rohanda Agung (Indonesia) Enroe	21–18, 21–11	(gold) Winner
2007	Indonesia International	(Indonesia) Yonathan Suryatama Dasuki	(Indonesia) Fran Kurniawan (Indonesia) Ade Lukas	21–18, 21–17	(gold) Winner
2007	Italian International	(Indonesia) Yonathan Suryatama Dasuki	(Denmark) Mathias Boe (Denmark) Carsten Mogensen	18–21, 21–16, 11–21	(silver) Runner-up
2011	White Nights	(Indonesia) Rendra Wijaya	(Indonesia) Fernando Kurniawan (Indonesia) Wifqi Windarto	14–21, 21–13, 21–12	(gold) Winner
2011	Indonesia International	(Indonesia) Rendra Wijaya	(Malaysia) Ow Yao Han (Malaysia) Tan Wee Kiong	21–13, 19–21, 21–16	(gold) Winner

BWF International Challenge tournament
BWF International Series tournament

== Performance timeline ==
=== National team ===
- Junior level

Team events	2002
Asian Junior Championships	Gold
World Junior Championships	Bronze

- Senior level

Team events	2009
Sudirman Cup	Bronze

=== Individual competitions ===
- Junior level

Event	2002
Asian Junior Championships	Bronze

- Senior level

Event	2009	2010
World Championships	R3	R3

Tournament	2007	2008	2009	Best
BWF Super Series
Japan Open	A	SF	F	F (2009)
BWF Super Series Finals	—N/a	NQ	GS	GS (2009)

Tournament	2006	2007	2008	2009	2010	2011	2012	2013	Best
BWF Grand Prix and Grand Prix Gold
New Zealand Open	W				—N/a		—N/a	A	W (2006)
(Netherlands) Dutch Open	W	W		A					W (2006, 2007)
Indonesia Masters	—N/a				F	R1	QF	R1	F (2010)
