= 2010 BWF World Championships =

Tournament details
- Dates: 23 August – 29 August
- Edition: 18th
- Level: International
- Venue: Stade Pierre de Coubertin
- Location: Paris, France

The 2010 BWF World Championships was the 18th tournament of the World Badminton Championships, a global tournament in the sport of badminton. It was held at Stade Pierre de Coubertin in Paris, France, from August 23 to August 29, 2010. Originally the competition is to be held at Palais Omnisports de Paris-Bercy but it was moved to Stade Pierre de Coubertin due to financial issues.

== Host city selection ==
Australia, France, South Korea, and other nations submitted bids to host the championships. France was later announced as the host for the championships.

== Draw ==
The draw took place on 9 August 2010 in Kuala Lumpur, Malaysia.

== Medalists ==
=== Medal table ===
* Host nation (France)

Rank	Nation	Gold	Silver	Bronze	Total
1	China (CHN)	5	3	3	11
2	Indonesia (IDN)	0	1	1	2
3	Malaysia (MAS)	0	1	0	1
4	Chinese Taipei (TPE)	0	0	2	2
4	Denmark (DEN)	0	0	2	2
4	South Korea (KOR)	0	0	2	2
Totals (6 entries)		5	5	10	20

=== Events ===
Event	Gold	Silver	Bronze
Men's singles	Chen Jin; China	Taufik Hidayat; Indonesia	Park Sung-hwan; South Korea
Men's singles	Chen Jin; China	Taufik Hidayat; Indonesia	Peter Gade; Denmark
Women's singles	Wang Lin; China	Wang Xin; China	Tine Rasmussen; Denmark
Women's singles	Wang Lin; China	Wang Xin; China	Wang Shixian; China
Men's doubles	China; Cai Yun; Fu Haifeng	Malaysia; Koo Kien Keat; Tan Boon Heong	China; Guo Zhendong; Xu Chen
Men's doubles	China; Cai Yun; Fu Haifeng	Malaysia; Koo Kien Keat; Tan Boon Heong	Indonesia; Markis Kido; Hendra Setiawan
Women's doubles	China; Du Jing; Yu Yang	China; Ma Jin; Wang Xiaoli	China; Cheng Shu; Zhao Yunlei
Women's doubles	China; Du Jing; Yu Yang	China; Ma Jin; Wang Xiaoli	Chinese Taipei; Cheng Wen-hsing; Chien Yu-chin
Mixed doubles	China; Zheng Bo; Ma Jin	China; He Hanbin; Yu Yang	South Korea; Ko Sung-hyun; Ha Jung-eun
Mixed doubles	China; Zheng Bo; Ma Jin	China; He Hanbin; Yu Yang	Chinese Taipei; Lee Sheng-mu; Chien Yu-chin

== Logo plagiarism controversy ==
In August-2013, Brazilian news portals reported that the competition logo had been plagiarized by a company named Telexfree which became operational only in 2011, two years after Badminton World Federation (logo owner) and Taïo Design Consulting (logo creator) launched the official brand for 2010 BWF World Championships. Because of this issue, Telexfree have decided to execute a re-brand campaign without giving any official explanations about the case or if there is any legal action moved by the logo owner.

Telexfree and Yonex BWF World Championships Paris 2010 logos
