= Jung Jae-sung =

South Korean badminton player (1982–2018)

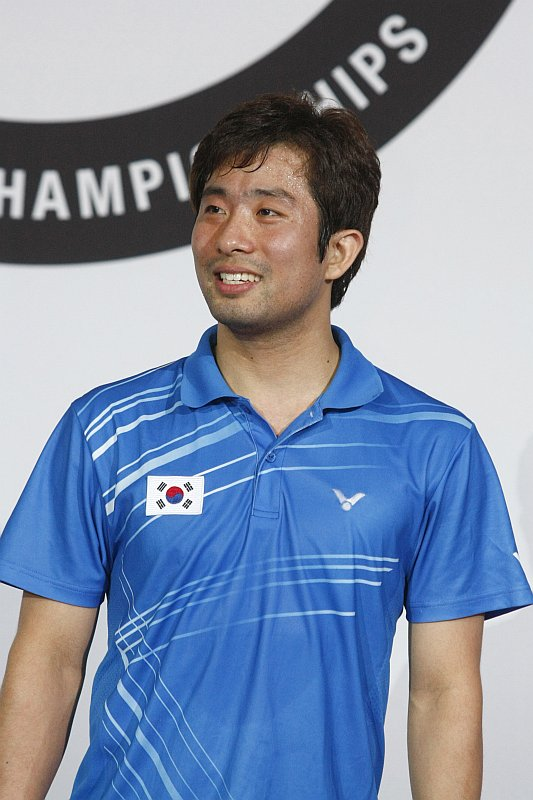
- Jung at the 2011 German Open

Personal information
- Born: 25 August 1982 Jeonju, North Jeolla Province, South Korea
- Died: 9 March 2018 (aged 35) Hwaseong, Gyeonggi, South Korea
- Height: 1.68 m (5 ft 6 in)
- Weight: 69 kg (152 lb; 10.9 st)

Sport
- Country: South Korea
- Sport: Badminton
- Handedness: Right
- Coached by: Ha Tae-kwon

Men's doubles
- Highest ranking: 1 (with Lee Yong-dae January 2009)
- BWF profile
Medal record
Men's badminton
Representing South Korea
Olympic Games
Bronze medal – third place	2012 London	Men's doubles
World Championships
Silver medal – second place	2007 Kuala Lumpur	Men's doubles
Silver medal – second place	2009 Hyderabad	Men's doubles
Bronze medal – third place	2011 London	Men's doubles
Sudirman Cup
Silver medal – second place	2009 Guangzhou	Mixed team
Bronze medal – third place	2007 Glasgow	Mixed team
Bronze medal – third place	2011 Qingdao	Mixed team
Thomas Cup
Silver medal – second place	2008 Jakarta	Men's team
Asian Games
Silver medal – second place	2006 Doha	Men's team
Silver medal – second place	2010 Guangzhou	Men's team
Bronze medal – third place	2006 Doha	Men's doubles
Bronze medal – third place	2010 Guangzhou	Men's doubles
Asian Championships
Gold medal – first place	2008 Johor Bahru	Men's doubles
Silver medal – second place	2005 Hyderabad	Men's doubles
Asia Cup
Silver medal – second place	2001 Singapore	Men's team
World Junior Championships
Silver medal – second place	2000 Guangzhou	Mixed team
Asian Junior Championships
Silver medal – second place	2000 Kyoto	Boys' doubles
Bronze medal – third place	1999 Yangon	Boys' team
Bronze medal – third place	2000 Kyoto	Boys' team

Jung Jae-sung (also spelled Chung Jae-sung; Korean: 정재성; Hanja: 鄭在成; Korean pronunciation: [tɕʌŋ.dʑɛ̝.sʌŋ]; 25 August 1982 – 9 March 2018) was a South Korean professional badminton player who specialized in men's doubles.

Together with his partner Lee Yong-dae, Jung spent forty weeks as World No. 1 in the men's doubles discipline between 2009 and 2012, winning eighteen BWF World Superseries tournaments and placing second at the BWF World Championships on two occasions in 2007 and 2009. He was a two-time winner of the All-England Open, gold medalist at the 2008 Badminton Asian Championships, and won the bronze medal at the 2012 Olympic Games in the final tournament of his professional career.

== Career ==
Jung was born on 25 August 1982 in Jeonju, North Jeolla Province. He started playing badminton at 7, at his local elementary school. He entered the South Korea national badminton team in 2001.

In 2000, Jung was part of the Korean national junior team competed at the World Junior Championships in Guangzhou, China, and Asian Junior Championships in Kyoto, Japan. In Guangzhou, he won the mixed team bronze after his team lost 2–3 to China, and in Kyoto, he won the boys' doubles silver and boys' team bronze.

In 2003, Jung, who represented Wonkwang University, won the men's doubles title at the National Championships in Gyeonggi partnered with Lee Jae-jin. In 2004, he and Lee Jae-jin retained their title, and in 2006, Jung repeated his success partnered with Lee Yong-dae.

In 2005, Jung won the Thailand Open with his former partner Lee Jae-jin, beating the Danes Lars Paaske and Jonas Rasmussen in the finals. In 2006, Jung won the Thailand Open together with Lee Yong-dae; they had a walkover in the final against compatriots Lee Jae-jin, with whom Jung won the last Thailand Open, and Hwang Ji-man. At the Asian Games, Jung and Lee became bronze medalists after losing the semi-finals to Luluk Hadiyanto and Alvent Yulianto of Indonesia in the individual men's doubles event. In the team event, South Korea lost to China in the final 2–3, thus gaining Jung a silver medal.

In 2007, Jung and Lee Yong-dae participated in the Malaysia Open, the first ever BWF Super Series event. There they got through the first round but had to resign due to injury. However a week later they blew away competition to take the first prize at the Korea Open. Jung and Lee lost to Lee Jae-jin and Hwang Ji-man in the final of the German Open. Jung participated to the 2007 Sudirman Cup with the South Korea team. The team lost to China in the semi-finals with a score of 0–3. In July, after a period of disappointing results in men's doubles, Lee became runner-up with Jung at the Thailand Open, losing to Lee Jae-jin and Hwang Ji-man. Not much later, the pair went on to take the silver medal in the 2007 BWF World Championships. They were defeated in the final by Markis Kido and Hendra Setiawan of Indonesia, 19–21, 19–21. The rest of the year also resulted in quite disappointing achievements, not getting past quarterfinals in any major events, except in the French Open. Jung and Lee there lost to the eventual winners, Cai Yun and Fu Haifeng of China.

To start 2008, Jung, together with Lee, disappointingly lost to the unseeded pair of Simon Mollyhus and Anders Kristiansen in the second round of the Malaysia Open. In South Korea, things went a bit better, achieving a quarterfinal. There they lost to eventual runners-up Luluk Hadiyanto and Alvent Yulianto of Indonesia. More than a month later, Jung and Lee came back with a bang to win the All England Open, beating Malaysians Choong Tan Fook and Lee Wan Wah in a thrilling semi-final (coming back from a 16–20 deficit in the third game) and compatriots Lee Jae-jin and Hwang Ji-man in the finals. A week later, the pair were victorious in the Swiss Open too. At the Asian Championships Jung and Lee gained the gold medal, beating Candra Wijaya and Nova Widianto of Indonesia in the final. He competed at the Thomas Cup, helped his team reach the final round, where Jung and Lee were the only ones to score a point for South Korea against China in the final, which ended in a 3–1 win for China. In November, Jung also won the 2008 China Open Super Series.

=== 2008 Olympic Games ===
Not having participated in the two following Superseries events, supposedly because of their preparations for the Summer Olympics, Jung and Lee were disappointingly knocked out in the first round in Beijing. His partner went on to get the gold medal in mixed doubles.

=== 2012 Olympic Games ===
At the London Olympics, Jung, together with Lee, won the men's doubles bronze medal. The pair who were seeded two, advanced to the knock-out stage after placing first, won three matches in group D stage. They lost the match in the semi-final match against Mathias Boe and Carsten Mogensen of Denmark, and in the bronze medal match, they beat the Malaysian pair Koo Kien Keat and Tan Boon Heong in straight games. This was Jung's final tournament.

== Death ==
On 9 March 2018, at the age of 35, Jung died suddenly of a heart attack at his home in Hwaseong after reportedly suffering from cardiac arrhythmia. His funeral was held on 11 March at Ajou University Hospital, with his longtime doubles partner Lee Yong-dae acting as a pallbearer.

== Achievements ==
=== Olympic Games ===
Men's doubles
Year	Venue	Partner	Opponent	Score	Result
2012	Wembley Arena, London, Great Britain	(South Korea) Lee Yong-dae	(Malaysia) Koo Kien Keat (Malaysia) Tan Boon Heong	23–21, 21–10	Bronze

=== BWF World Championships ===
Men's doubles
Year	Venue	Partner	Opponent	Score	Result
2007	Putra Indoor Stadium, Kuala Lumpur, Malaysia	(South Korea) Lee Yong-dae	(Indonesia) Markis Kido (Indonesia) Hendra Setiawan	19–21, 19–21	Silver
2009	Gachibowli Indoor Stadium, Hyderabad, India	(South Korea) Lee Yong-dae	(China) Cai Yun (China) Fu Haifeng	18–21, 21–16, 26–28	Silver
2011	Wembley Arena, London, England	(South Korea) Lee Yong-dae	(China) Cai Yun (China) Fu Haifeng	18–21, 14–21	Bronze

=== Asian Games ===
Men's doubles
Year	Venue	Partner	Opponent	Score	Result
2006	Aspire Hall 3, Doha, Qatar	(South Korea) Lee Yong-dae	(Indonesia) Luluk Hadiyanto (Indonesia) Alvent Yulianto	25–23, 18–21, 19–21	Bronze
2010	Tianhe Gymnasium, Guangzhou, China	(South Korea) Lee Yong-dae	(Indonesia) Markis Kido (Indonesia) Hendra Setiawan	15–21, 21–13, 18–21	Bronze

=== Asian Championships ===
Men's doubles
Year	Venue	Partner	Opponent	Score	Result
2005	Gachibowli Indoor Stadium, Hyderabad, India	(South Korea) Lee Jae-jin	(Indonesia) Markis Kido (Indonesia) Hendra Setiawan	11–15, 7–15	Silver
2008	Bandaraya Stadium, Johor Bahru, Malaysia	(South Korea) Lee Yong-dae	(Indonesia) Nova Widianto (Indonesia) Candra Wijaya	21–16, 21–18	Gold

=== Asian Junior Championships ===
Boys' doubles
Year	Venue	Partner	Opponent	Score	Result
2000	Nishiyama Park Gymnasium, Kyoto, Japan	(South Korea) Lee Jae-jin	(China) Sang Yang (China) Zheng Bo	16–17, 15–11, 12–15	Silver

=== BWF Superseries ===
The BWF Superseries, launched on 14 December 2006 and implemented in 2007, is a series of elite badminton tournaments, sanctioned by Badminton World Federation (BWF). BWF Superseries has two level such as Superseries and Superseries Premier. A season of Superseries features twelve tournaments around the world, which introduced since 2011, with successful players invited to the Superseries Finals held at the year end.

Men's doubles
Year	Tournament	Partner	Opponent	Score	Result
2007	Korea Open	(South Korea) Lee Yong-dae	(South Korea) Hwang Ji-man (South Korea) Lee Jae-jin	21–16, 21–15	(gold) Winner
2008	All England Open	(South Korea) Lee Yong-dae	(South Korea) Hwang Ji-man (South Korea) Lee Jae-jin	20–22, 21–19, 21–18	(gold) Winner
2008	Swiss Open	(South Korea) Lee Yong-dae	(Indonesia) Markis Kido (Indonesia) Hendra Setiawan	17–21, 21–16, 21–13	(gold) Winner
2008	China Open	(South Korea) Lee Yong-dae	(Denmark) Mathias Boe (Denmark) Carsten Mogensen	17–21, 21–17, 21–13	(gold) Winner
2008	Hong Kong Open	(South Korea) Lee Yong-dae	(Malaysia) Mohd Zakry Abdul Latif (Malaysia) Mohd Fairuzizuan Mohd Tazari	25–23, 19–21, 22–20	(gold) Winner
2008	World Superseries Masters Finals	(South Korea) Lee Yong-dae	(Malaysia) Koo Kien Keat (Malaysia) Tan Boon Heong	18–21, 14–21	(silver) Runner-up
2009	Malaysia Open	(South Korea) Lee Yong-dae	(Indonesia) Hendra Aprida Gunawan (Indonesia) Alvent Yulianto	18–21, 21–14, 21–14	(gold) Winner
2009	Korea Open	(South Korea) Lee Yong-dae	(Denmark) Mathias Boe (Denmark) Carsten Mogensen	12–21, 22–24	(silver) Runner-up
2009	Indonesia Open	(South Korea) Lee Yong-dae	(China) Cai Yun (China) Fu Haifeng	21–15, 21–18	(gold) Winner
2009	Hong Kong Open	(South Korea) Lee Yong-dae	(Denmark) Lars Paaske (Denmark) Jonas Rasmussen	13–21, 21–15, 21–8	(gold) Winner
2009	China Open	(South Korea) Lee Yong-dae	(Malaysia) Koo Kien Keat (Malaysia) Tan Boon Heong	21–13, 19–21, 21–18	(gold) Winner
2009	World Superseries Masters Finals	(South Korea) Lee Yong-dae	(Denmark) Mathias Boe (Denmark) Carsten Mogensen	21–15, 21–15	(gold) Winner
2010	Korea Open	(South Korea) Lee Yong-dae	(China) Cai Yun (China) Fu Haifeng	21–11, 14–21, 21–18	(gold) Winner
2010	China Open	(South Korea) Lee Yong-dae	(China) Chai Biao (China) Zhang Nan	21–15, 21–12	(gold) Winner
2010	World Superseries Finals	(South Korea) Lee Yong-dae	(Denmark) Mathias Boe (Denmark) Carsten Mogensen	17–21, 15–21	(silver) Runner-up
2011	Korea Open	(South Korea) Lee Yong-dae	(Denmark) Mathias Boe (Denmark) Carsten Mogensen	21–6, 21–13	(gold) Winner
2011	China Masters	(South Korea) Lee Yong-dae	(China) Cai Yun (China) Fu Haifeng	21–17, 21–10	(gold) Winner
2011	Denmark Open	(South Korea) Lee Yong-dae	(China) Cai Yun (China) Fu Haifeng	21–16, 21–17	(gold) Winner
2011	French Open	(South Korea) Lee Yong-dae	(China) Cai Yun (China) Fu Haifeng	14–21, 21–15, 21–11	(gold) Winner
2011	Hong Kong Open	(South Korea) Lee Yong-dae	(China) Cai Yun (China) Fu Haifeng	21–14, 22–24, 19–21	(silver) Runner-up
2012	Korea Open	(South Korea) Lee Yong-dae	(China) Cai Yun (China) Fu Haifeng	21–18, 17–21, 19–21	(silver) Runner-up
2012	All England Open	(South Korea) Lee Yong-dae	(China) Cai Yun (China) Fu Haifeng	21–23, 21–9, 21–14	(gold) Winner
2012	Indonesia Open	(South Korea) Lee Yong-dae	(Denmark) Mathias Boe (Denmark) Carsten Mogensen	23–21, 19–21, 21–11	(gold) Winner

BWF Super Series Finals tournament
BWF Super Series Premier tournament
BWF Super Series tournament

=== BWF Grand Prix ===
The BWF Grand Prix has two levels, the BWF Grand Prix and Grand Prix Gold. It is a series of badminton tournaments sanctioned by the Badminton World Federation (BWF) since 2007. The World Badminton Grand Prix has been sanctioned by the International Badminton Federation since 1983.

Men's doubles
Year	Tournament	Partner	Opponent	Score	Result
2005	Thailand Open	(South Korea) Lee Jae-jin	(Denmark) Lars Paaske (Denmark) Jonas Rasmussen	15–11, 15–5	(gold) Winner
2006	German Open	(South Korea) Lee Yong-dae	(England) Robert Blair (England) Anthony Clark	15–11, 15–6	(gold) Winner
2006	Chinese Taipei Open	(South Korea) Lee Yong-dae	(China) Cai Yun (China) Fu Haifeng	14–21, 18–21	(silver) Runner-up
2006	Thailand Open	(South Korea) Lee Yong-dae	(South Korea) Hwang Ji-man (South Korea) Lee Jae-jin	Walkover	(gold) Winner
2007	German Open	(South Korea) Lee Yong-dae	(South Korea) Hwang Ji-man (South Korea) Lee Jae-jin	18–21, 20–22	(silver) Runner-up
2007	Thailand Open	(South Korea) Lee Yong-dae	(South Korea) Hwang Ji-man (South Korea) Lee Jae-jin	19–21, 21–19, 9–21	(silver) Runner-up
2008	German Open	(South Korea) Lee Yong-dae	(South Korea) Hwang Ji-man (South Korea) Lee Jae-jin	13–21, 19–21	(silver) Runner-up
2010	Chinese Taipei Open	(South Korea) Lee Yong-dae	(South Korea) Cho Gun-woo (South Korea) Kwon Yi-goo	21–10, 21–16	(gold) Winner
2010	Korea Grand Prix	(South Korea) Lee Yong-dae	(South Korea) Ko Sung-hyun (South Korea) Yoo Yeon-seong	18–21, 21–18, 27–27	(gold) Winner
2011	German Open	(South Korea) Lee Yong-dae	(South Korea) Kim Gi-jung (South Korea) Kim Sa-rang	21–19, 18–21, 21–11	(gold) Winner
2011	Swiss Open	(South Korea) Lee Yong-dae	(South Korea) Ko Sung-hyun (South Korea) Yoo Yeon-seong	17–21, 16–21	(silver) Runner-up
2011	Thailand Open	(South Korea) Lee Yong-dae	(Indonesia) Hendra Aprida Gunawan (Indonesia) Alvent Yulianto	24–22, 21–14	(gold) Winner
2011	Chinese Taipei Open	(South Korea) Lee Yong-dae	(South Korea) Ko Sung-hyun (South Korea) Yoo Yeon-seong	21–23, 17–21	(silver) Runner-up
2011	Korea Grand Prix Gold	(South Korea) Lee Yong-dae	(South Korea) Ko Sung-hyun (South Korea) Yoo Yeon-seong	15–21, 22–24	(silver) Runner-up
2012	German Open	(South Korea) Lee Yong-dae	(China) Hong Wei (China) Shen Ye	19–21, 21–18, 19–21	(silver) Runner-up

BWF Grand Prix Gold tournament
BWF Grand Prix tournament

=== BWF International Challenge/Series/Satellite ===
Men's doubles
Year	Tournament	Partner	Opponent	Score	Result
2004	Vietnam Satellite	(South Korea) Hwang Ji-man	(Indonesia) Rian Sukmawan (Indonesia) Yoga Ukikasah	15–17, 7–15	(silver) Runner-up
2008	Korea International	(South Korea) Lee Yong-dae	(South Korea) Cho Gun-woo (South Korea) Yoo Yeon-seong	21–16, 26–24	(gold) Winner
2009	Korea International	(South Korea) Lee Yong-dae	(South Korea) Ko Sung-hyun (South Korea) Yoo Yeon-seong	21–19, 15–21, 21–15	(gold) Winner

BWF International Challenge tournament
BWF International Series tournament
