= Yonathan Suryatama Dasuki =

Indonesian badminton player (born 1985)

Personal information
- Born: Yonathan Suryatama Dasuki; 21 November 1985 (age 40) Jember, East Java, Indonesia
- Height: 1.79 m (5 ft 10 in)
- Weight: 75 kg (165 lb)

Sport
- Country: Indonesia
- Sport: Badminton
- Handedness: Right

Men's doubles
- Highest ranking: 14 Rian Sukmawan
- BWF profile

Yonathan Suryatama Dasuki (born 21 November 1985) is a retired Indonesian badminton player specializing in doubles from Djarum club. He won the men's doubles title at the 2005 Indonesian National Championships. In the international tournaments, Dasuki has been partnering with some players, like Rian Sukmawan and Hendra Aprida Gunawan.

== Career ==
Yonathan Suryatama Dasuki won the 2005 National Championship with Yoga Ukikasah. Two years later he reached the first place at the Indonesia International. 2009 and 2010 he participated at the BWF World Championships. On both occasions he was 9th in the men's doubles.

== Achievements ==
=== BWF Superseries (1 runner-up) ===
The BWF Superseries, launched on 14 December 2006 and implemented in 2007, is a series of elite badminton tournaments, sanctioned by Badminton World Federation (BWF). BWF Superseries has two level such as Superseries and Superseries Premier. A season of Superseries features twelve tournaments around the world, which introduced since 2011, with successful players invited to the Superseries Finals held at the year end.

Men's doubles
Year	Tournament	Partner	Opponent	Score	Result
2009	Japan Open	(Indonesia) Rian Sukmawan	(Indonesia) Markis Kido (Indonesia) Hendra Setiawan	19–21, 22–24	(silver) Runner-up

BWF Super Series Finals tournament
BWF Super Series Premier tournament
BWF Super Series tournament

=== BWF Grand Prix (1 title, 1 runner-up) ===
The BWF Grand Prix has two levels, the BWF Grand Prix and Grand Prix Gold. It is a series of badminton tournaments sanctioned by the Badminton World Federation (BWF) since 2007.

Men's doubles
Year	Tournament	Partner	Opponent	Score	Result
2007	Dutch Open	(Indonesia) Rian Sukmawan	(Indonesia) Fran Kurniawan (Indonesia) Rendra Wijaya	21–13, 21–12	(gold) Winner
2010	Indonesia Grand Prix Gold	(Indonesia) Rian Sukmawan	(Indonesia) Mohammad Ahsan (Indonesia) Bona Septano	16–21, 17–18 retired	(silver) Runner-up

BWF Grand Prix Gold tournament
BWF Grand Prix tournament

=== BWF International Challenge/Series (2 titles, 3 runners-up) ===
Men's doubles
Year	Tournament	Partner	Opponent	Score	Result
2004	Cheers Asian Satellite	(Indonesia) Rendra Wijaya	(Malaysia) Lin Woon Fui (Malaysia) Mohd Fairuzizuan Mohd Tazari	8–15, 9–15	(silver) Runner-up
2006	Cheers Asian Satellite	(Indonesia) Yoga Ukikasah	(Indonesia) Fran Kurniawan (Indonesia) Rendra Wijaya	21–19, 18–21, 22–20	(gold) Winner
2007	Indonesia International	(Indonesia) Rian Sukmawan	(Indonesia) Fran Kurniawan (Indonesia) Ade Lukas	21–18, 21–17	(gold) Winner
2007	Italian International	(Indonesia) Rian Sukmawan	(Denmark) Mathias Boe (Denmark) Carsten Mogensen	18–21, 21–16, 11–21	(silver) Runner-up
2012	Indonesia International	(Indonesia) Hendra Aprida Gunawan	(Indonesia) Ricky Karanda Suwardi (Indonesia) Muhammad Ulinnuha	12–21, 21–12, 16–21	(silver) Runner-up

== Performance timeline ==
=== Individual competitions ===
- Senior level

Event	2009	2010	2011	2013
BWF World Championships	R3	R3	A	R1

Tournament	2007	2008	2009	Best
BWF Super Series
Japan Open	A	SF	F	F (2009)
BWF Super Series Finals	—N/a	NQ	GS	GS (2009)

Tournament	2007	2008	2009	2010	2011	2012	2013	Best
BWF Grand Prix and Grand Prix Gold
(Netherlands) Dutch Open	W		A		QF	QF	A	W (2007)
(Indonesia) Indonesian Masters	—N/a			F	A	SF	R2	F (2010)
