= Fu Haifeng =

Chinese badminton player (born 1983)

Fu Haifeng 傅海峰
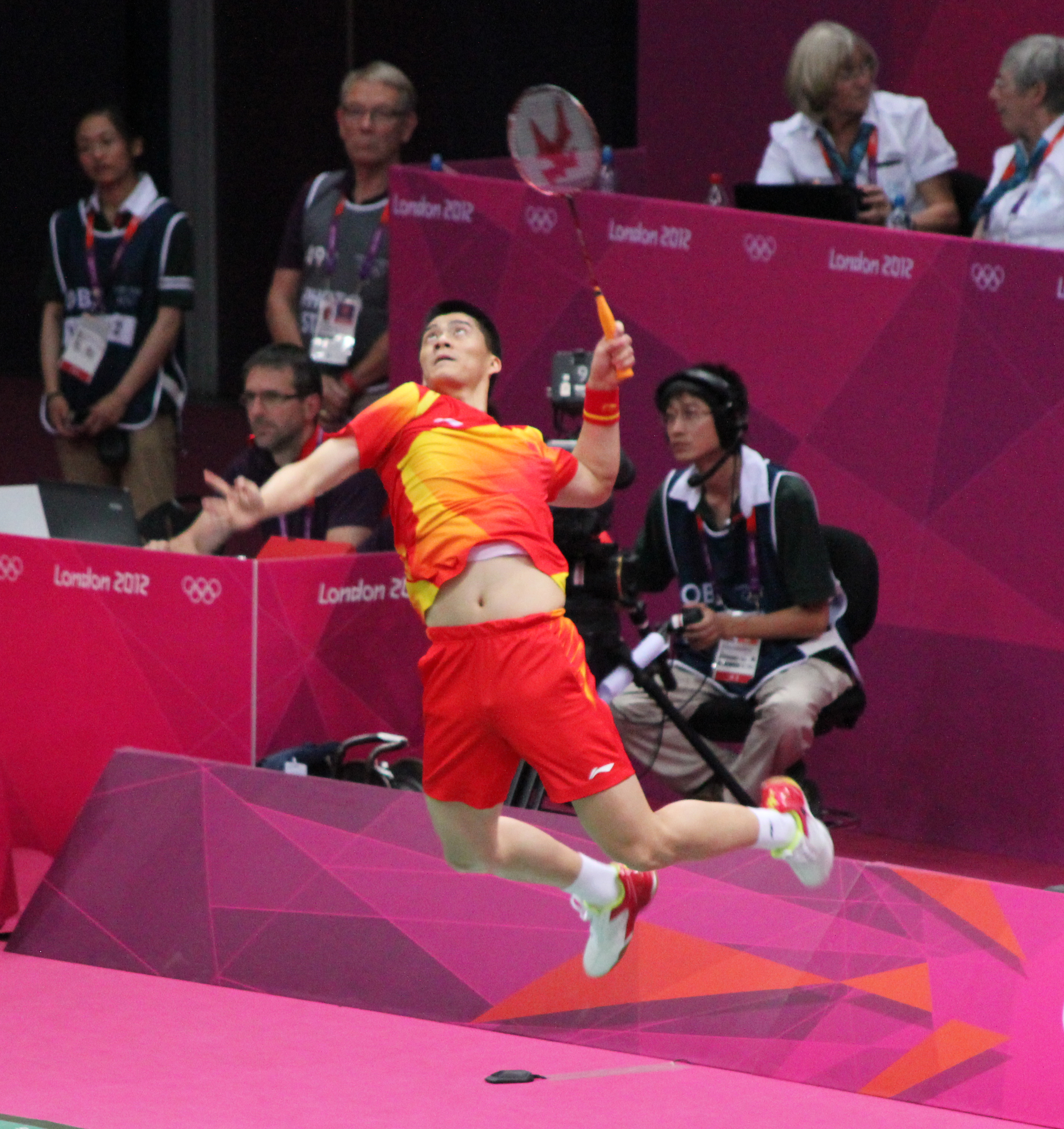
- Fu in 2012

Personal information
- Born: 23 August 1983 (age 43) Jieyang, Guangdong, China
- Height: 1.81 m (5 ft 11 in)
- Weight: 70 kg (154 lb; 11 st 0 lb)

Sport
- Country: China
- Sport: Badminton
- Handedness: Left

Men's doubles
- Highest ranking: 1 (with Cai Yun 7 September 2006); 2 (with Zhang Nan 29 September 2016)
- BWF profile
Medal record
Men's badminton
Representing China
Olympic Games
Gold medal – first place	2012 London	Men's doubles
Gold medal – first place	2016 Rio de Janeiro	Men's doubles
Silver medal – second place	2008 Beijing	Men's doubles
World Championships
Gold medal – first place	2006 Madrid	Men's doubles
Gold medal – first place	2009 Hyderabad	Men's doubles
Gold medal – first place	2010 Paris	Men's doubles
Gold medal – first place	2011 London	Men's doubles
Bronze medal – third place	2003 Birmingham	Men's doubles
Bronze medal – third place	2013 Guangzhou	Men's doubles
World Cup
Gold medal – first place	2005 Yiyang	Men's doubles
Bronze medal – third place	2006 Yiyang	Men's doubles
Sudirman Cup
Gold medal – first place	2005 Beijing	Mixed team
Gold medal – first place	2007 Glasgow	Mixed team
Gold medal – first place	2009 Guangzhou	Mixed team
Gold medal – first place	2011 Qingdao	Mixed team
Gold medal – first place	2013 Kuala Lumpur	Mixed team
Gold medal – first place	2015 Dongguan	Mixed team
Silver medal – second place	2003 Eindhoven	Mixed team
Silver medal – second place	2017 Gold Coast	Mixed team
Thomas Cup
Gold medal – first place	2004 Jakarta	Men's team
Gold medal – first place	2006 Tokyo	Men's team
Gold medal – first place	2008 Jakarta	Men's team
Gold medal – first place	2010 Kuala Lumpur	Men's team
Gold medal – first place	2012 Wuhan	Men's team
Bronze medal – third place	2014 New Delhi	Men's team
Asian Games
Gold medal – first place	2006 Doha	Men's team
Gold medal – first place	2010 Guangzhou	Men's team
Silver medal – second place	2014 Incheon	Men's team
Asian Championships
Gold medal – first place	2011 Chengdu	Men's doubles
Bronze medal – third place	2016 Wuhan	Men's doubles

Fu Haifeng
- Traditional Chinese: 傅海峰
- Simplified Chinese: 傅海峰
Transcriptions
Standard Mandarin
- Hanyu Pinyin: Fù Hǎifēng
Yue: Cantonese
- Yale Romanization: Fu6 Hoi2 Fung1

Fu Haifeng (born 23 August 1983) is a Chinese badminton player. He is considered one of the all-time greats of badminton. Combining Fu Haifeng's impressive power with his regular partner Cai Yun's impressive speed, he has won numerous top tier events on the world circuit including the All England Open in 2005 and 2009 and the BWF World Championships in 2006, 2009, 2010 and 2011. Cai and Fu have helped China win five consecutive Thomas Cup (World men's team championships) (2004, 2006, 2008, 2010, and 2012) and six consecutive Sudirman Cup (World mixed team championships) (2005, 2007, 2009, 2011, 2013 and 2015). Cai and Fu also competed together in the Olympic games 3 times, including the 2004, the 2008 and the 2012 Olympic Games.

== Career ==
At the 2010 BWF World Championships in Paris, Fu with his partner Cai Yun being the fifth seed—beat the third seed Danish pair Mathias Boe and Carsten Mogensen 21–11, 21–18 in the quarter-finals. In the semi-finals, they defeated the second seed Indonesian Olympic Champions Markis Kido and Hendra Setiawan 21–16, 21–13. In the finals, they overcame the first seed and Malaysian world no. 1 Koo Kien Keat and Tan Boon Heong 18–21, 21–18, 21–14 to win the world title for the 3rd time. They are the first men's doubles pair to achieve this feat.

Cai and Fu went on to win the China Masters Super Series. Being the fifth seed, they first defeated their second seed compatriots Xu Chen and Guo Zhendong 21–11, 21–16 in the quarterfinals. In the semifinals, they made a great comeback against the third seed South Korean rival Lee Yong-dae and Jung Jae-sung 20–22, 21–13, 21–17. Cai and Fu then clinched their second China Masters title by defeating the fourth seed South Korean pair Yoo Yeon-seong and Ko Sung-hyun in 2 sets 21–14, 21–19. Cai and Fu won their third title in a row by winning the Yonex Japan Open Super Series. They, being the fifth seed, beat the young Korean Pair Cho Gun-woo and Kwon Yi-goo 21–14, 16–21, 21–12 in the quarterfinals. In the semifinals, they defeated their promising compatriots Zhang Nan and Chai Biao 21–17, 21–16. In the finals, they made a great comeback again against the first seed and Malaysian world no. 1 Koo Kien Keat and Tan Boon Heong 18–21, 21–14, 21–12 to win their first Japan Open title.

At the 2012 Summer Olympics, they defeated Denmark's Mathias Boe and Carsten Mogensen in the final to win the gold medal.

Having had 1 Olympic gold medal and 4 World Championship titles, as well as many other titles, Cai and Fu are one of the most successful men's doubles pair in badminton history.

An ancillary badminton achievement of Fu is that while competing in the 2005 Sudirman Cup, one of his smashes was clocked at 332 km/h (206 mph), the fastest propulsion of a shuttle on record. Fu also fired a 303 km/h smash during game 3 of the 2010 BWF World Championships men's doubles final, which was confirmed by the commentator Gillian Clark as the fastest of the tournament. The fastest smash by Fu during the 2011 Sudirman Cup final was clocked at 291 km/h.

In 2014, Fu played with mixed doubles champion Zhang Nan in the All England Super Series. They lost to the Indonesian pair Muhammad Ahsan and Hendra Setiawan in the quarter finals 21–23 20–22. Later on it, they took revenge at Denmark Open Super Series, and became the champion after beating top seed Korean pair Lee Yong-dae and Yoo Yeon-seong in 2 straight sets in the final.

In 2015, his partnership with Zhang Nan was stable after reaching several Super Series Finals such as Singapore Open, Indonesia Open, Japan Open, All England as runners-up.

In 2016, they won the Singapore Open Super Series after beating the top seed from Korea Lee/Yoo in 2 straight sets at semi final. Their performance later in several Super Series was not so climatic. They were seeded 4th in the Olympic Games in Rio, as Fu claimed his second gold medal in men's doubles category after beating Malaysian's pair Tan/Goh in 3 sets. He ends his career having reached 3 consecutive finals in the Olympic Games with two different partners, winning gold twice.

== Achievements ==
=== Olympic Games ===
Men's doubles
Year	Venue	Partner	Opponent	Score	Result
2008	Beijing University of Technology Gymnasium, Beijing, China	(China) Cai Yun	(Indonesia) Markis Kido (Indonesia) Hendra Setiawan	21–12, 11–21, 16–21	Silver
2012	Wembley Arena, London, Great Britain	(China) Cai Yun	(Denmark) Mathias Boe (Denmark) Carsten Mogensen	21–16, 21–15	Gold
2016	Riocentro – Pavilion 4, Rio de Janeiro, Brazil	(China) Zhang Nan	(Malaysia) Goh V Shem (Malaysia) Tan Wee Kiong	16–21, 21–11, 23–21	Gold

=== BWF World Championships ===
Men's doubles
Year	Venue	Partner	Opponent	Score	Result
2003	National Indoor Arena, Birmingham, United Kingdom	(China) Cai Yun	(Indonesia) Sigit Budiarto (Indonesia) Candra Wijaya	15–6, 10–15, 9–15	Bronze
2006	Palacio de Deportes de la Comunidad, Madrid, Spain	(China) Cai Yun	(England) Robert Blair (England) Anthony Clark	21–9, 21–13	Gold
2009	Gachibowli Indoor Stadium, Hyderabad, India	(China) Cai Yun	(South Korea) Jung Jae-sung (South Korea) Lee Yong-dae	21–18, 16–21, 28–26	Gold
2010	Stade Pierre de Coubertin, Paris, France	(China) Cai Yun	(Malaysia) Koo Kien Keat (Malaysia) Tan Boon Heong	18–21, 21–18, 21–14	Gold
2011	Wembley Arena, London, England	(China) Cai Yun	(South Korea) Ko Sung-hyun (South Korea) Yoo Yeon-seong	24–22, 21–16	Gold
2013	Tianhe Sports Center, Guangzhou, China	(China) Cai Yun	(Indonesia) Mohammad Ahsan (Indonesia) Hendra Setiawan	19–21, 17–21	Bronze

=== World Cup ===
Men's doubles
Year	Venue	Partner	Opponent	Score	Result
2005	Olympic Park, Yiyang, China	(China) Cai Yun	(Indonesia) Sigit Budiarto (Indonesia) Candra Wijaya	21–11, 21–18	Gold
2006	Olympic Park, Yiyang, China	(China) Cai Yun	(Malaysia) Lin Woon Fui (Malaysia) Mohd Fairuzizuan Mohd Tazari	15–21, 21–13, 17–21	Bronze

=== Asian Championships ===
Men's doubles
Year	Venue	Partner	Opponent	Score	Result
2011	Sichuan Gymnasium, Chengdu, China	(China) Cai Yun	(Japan) Hirokatsu Hashimoto (Japan) Noriyasu Hirata	21–12, 21–15	Gold
2016	Wuhan Sports Center Gymnasium, Wuhan, China	(China) Zhang Nan	(China) Li Junhui (China) Liu Yuchen	21–23, 19–21	Bronze

=== BWF Superseries (16 titles, 14 runners-up) ===
The BWF Superseries, which was launched on 14 December 2006 and implemented in 2007, was a series of elite badminton tournaments, sanctioned by the Badminton World Federation (BWF). BWF Superseries levels were Superseries and Superseries Premier. A season of Superseries consisted of twelve tournaments around the world that had been introduced since 2011. Successful players were invited to the Superseries Finals, which were held at the end of each year.

Men's doubles
Year	Tournament	Partner	Opponent	Score	Result
2007	All England Open	(China) Cai Yun	(Malaysia) Koo Kien Keat (Malaysia) Tan Boon Heong	15–21, 18–21	(silver) Runner-up
2007	Singapore Open	(China) Cai Yun	(Malaysia) Choong Tan Fook (Malaysia) Lee Wan Wah	16–21, 24–22, 21–18	(gold) Winner
2007	Indonesia Open	(China) Cai Yun	(Malaysia) Mohd Zakry Abdul Latif (Malaysia) Mohd Fairuzizuan Mohd Tazari	21–17, 22–20	(gold) Winner
2007	China Masters	(China) Cai Yun	(Indonesia) Markis Kido (Indonesia) Hendra Setiawan	21–15, 21–16	(gold) Winner
2007	French Open	(China) Cai Yun	(Malaysia) Choong Tan Fook (Malaysia) Lee Wan Wah	21–14, 21–19	(gold) Winner
2008	Korea Open	(China) Cai Yun	(Indonesia) Luluk Hadiyanto (Indonesia) Alvent Yulianto	21–7, 20–22, 21–17	(gold) Winner
2008	Denmark Open	(China) Shen Ye	(Indonesia) Markis Kido (Indonesia) Hendra Setiawan	15–21, 12–21	(silver) Runner-up
2009	All England Open	(China) Cai Yun	(South Korea) Han Sang-hoon (South Korea) Hwang Ji-man	21–17, 21–15	(gold) Winner
2009	Indonesia Open	(China) Cai Yun	(South Korea) Jung Jae-sung (South Korea) Lee Yong-dae	15–21, 18–21	(silver) Runner-up
2009	China Masters	(China) Cai Yun	(China) Guo Zhendong (China) Xu Chen	Walkover	(silver) Runner-up
2010	Korea Open	(China) Cai Yun	(South Korea) Jung Jae-sung (South Korea) Lee Yong-dae	11–21, 21–14, 18–21	(silver) Runner-up
2010	China Masters	(China) Cai Yun	(South Korea) Ko Sung-hyun (South Korea) Yoo Yeon-seong	21–14, 21–19	(gold) Winner
2010	Japan Open	(China) Cai Yun	(Malaysia) Koo Kien Keat (Malaysia) Tan Boon Heong	18–21, 21–14, 21–12	(gold) Winner
2011	Singapore Open	(China) Cai Yun	(Indonesia) Hendra Aprida Gunawan (Indonesia) Alvent Yulianto	21–17, 21–13	(gold) Winner
2011	Indonesia Open	(China) Cai Yun	(China) Chai Biao (China) Guo Zhendong	21–13, 21–12	(gold) Winner
2011	China Masters	(China) Cai Yun	(South Korea) Jung Jae-sung (South Korea) Lee Yong-dae	17–21, 10–21	(silver) Runner-up
2011	Japan Open	(China) Cai Yun	(Indonesia) Mohammad Ahsan (Indonesia) Bona Septano	21–13, 23–21	(gold) Winner
2011	Denmark Open	(China) Cai Yun	(South Korea) Jung Jae-sung (South Korea) Lee Yong-dae	16–21, 17–21	(silver) Runner-up
2011	French Open	(China) Cai Yun	(South Korea) Jung Jae-sung (South Korea) Lee Yong-dae	21–14, 15–21, 11–21	(silver) Runner-up
2011	Hong Kong Open	(China) Cai Yun	(South Korea) Jung Jae-sung (South Korea) Lee Yong-dae	14–21, 24–22, 21–19	(gold) Winner
2012	Korea Open	(China) Cai Yun	(South Korea) Jung Jae-sung (South Korea) Lee Yong-dae	18–21, 21–17, 21–19	(gold) Winner
2012	All England Open	(China) Cai Yun	(South Korea) Jung Jae-sung (South Korea) Lee Yong-dae	23–21, 9–21, 14–21	(silver) Runner-up
2012	Hong Kong Open	(China) Cai Yun	(Malaysia) Koo Kien Keat (Malaysia) Tan Boon Heong	21–16, 21–17	(gold) Winner
2014	Denmark Open	(China) Zhang Nan	(South Korea) Lee Yong-dae (South Korea) Yoo Yeon-seong	21–13, 25–23	(gold) Winner
2015	All England Open	(China) Zhang Nan	(Denmark) Mathias Boe (Denmark) Carsten Mogensen	17–21, 20–22	(silver) Runner-up
2015	Indonesia Open	(China) Zhang Nan	(South Korea) Ko Sung-hyun (South Korea) Shin Baek-cheol	16–21, 21–16, 19–21	(silver) Runner-up
2015	Singapore Open	(China) Zhang Nan	(Indonesia) Angga Pratama (Indonesia) Ricky Karanda Suwardi	15–21, 21–11, 14–21	(silver) Runner-up
2015	Japan Open	(China) Zhang Nan	(South Korea) Lee Yong-dae (South Korea) Yoo Yeon-seong	19–21, 27–29	(silver) Runner-up
2016	Singapore Open	(China) Zhang Nan	(Japan) Takeshi Kamura (Japan) Keigo Sonoda	21–11, 22–20	(gold) Winner
2017	Malaysia Open	(China) Zheng Siwei	(Indonesia) Marcus Fernaldi Gideon (Indonesia) Kevin Sanjaya Sukamuljo	14–21, 21–14, 12–21	(silver) Runner-up

BWF Super Series Finals tournament
BWF Super Series Premier tournament
BWF Super Series tournament

=== BWF Grand Prix (8 titles, 8 runners-up) ===
The BWF Grand Prix had two levels, the Grand Prix and Grand Prix Gold. It was a series of badminton tournaments sanctioned by the Badminton World Federation (BWF) and played between 2007 and 2017. The World Badminton Grand Prix was sanctioned by the International Badminton Federation from 1983 to 2006.

Men's doubles
Year	Tournament	Partner	Opponent	Score	Result
2003	Malaysia Open	(China) Cai Yun	(South Korea) Kim Dong-moon (South Korea) Lee Dong-soo	15–17, 11–15	(silver) Runner-up
2003	German Open	(China) Cai Yun	(Indonesia) Eng Hian (Indonesia) Flandy Limpele	15–9, 8–15, 4–15	(silver) Runner-up
2004	Swiss Open	(China) Cai Yun	(Indonesia) Luluk Hadiyanto (Indonesia) Alvent Yulianto	15–9, 17–14	(gold) Winner
2004	Japan Open	(China) Cai Yun	(South Korea) Ha Tae-kwon (South Korea) Kim Dong-moon	7–15, 15–6, 6–15	(silver) Runner-up
2004	Indonesia Open	(China) Cai Yun	(Indonesia) Luluk Hadiyanto (Indonesia) Alvent Yulianto	8–15, 11–15	(silver) Runner-up
2005	German Open	(China) Cai Yun	(Denmark) Jens Eriksen (Denmark) Martin Lundgaard Hansen	6–15, 15–3, 15–10	(gold) Winner
2005	All England Open	(China) Cai Yun	(Denmark) Lars Paaske (Denmark) Jonas Rasmussen	15–10, 15–6	(gold) Winner
2005	Malaysia Open	(China) Cai Yun	(Indonesia) Sigit Budiarto (Indonesia) Candra Wijaya	11–15, 14–17	(silver) Runner-up
2005	Hong Kong Open	(China) Cai Yun	(Denmark) Jens Eriksen (Denmark) Martin Lundgaard Hansen	15–13, 15–9	(gold) Winner
2006	China Masters	(China) Cai Yun	(Denmark) Jens Eriksen (Denmark) Martin Lundgaard Hansen	17–21, 17–21	(silver) Runner-up
2006	Chinese Taipei Open	(China) Cai Yun	(South Korea) Jung Jae-sung (South Korea) Lee Yong-dae	21–14, 21–18	(gold) Winner
2006	Macau Open	(China) Cai Yun	(China) Guo Zhendong (China) Zheng Bo	21–12, 9–21, 21–19	(gold) Winner
2006	China Open	(China) Cai Yun	(Indonesia) Markis Kido (Indonesia) Hendra Setiawan	16–21, 16–21	(silver) Runner-up
2008	Thailand Open	(China) Cai Yun	(China) Guo Zhendong (China) Xie Zhongbo	21–17, retired	(gold) Winner
2014	Swiss Open	(China) Zhang Nan	(China) Chai Biao (China) Hong Wei	20–22, 14–21	(silver) Runner-up
2015	Chinese Taipei Open	(China) Zhang Nan	(Indonesia) Marcus Fernaldi Gideon (Indonesia) Kevin Sanjaya Sukamuljo	21–13, 21–8	(gold) Winner

BWF Grand Prix Gold tournament
BWF Grand Prix tournament
