= Koo Kien Keat =

Malaysian badminton player (born 1985)

Koo Kien Keat 古健杰
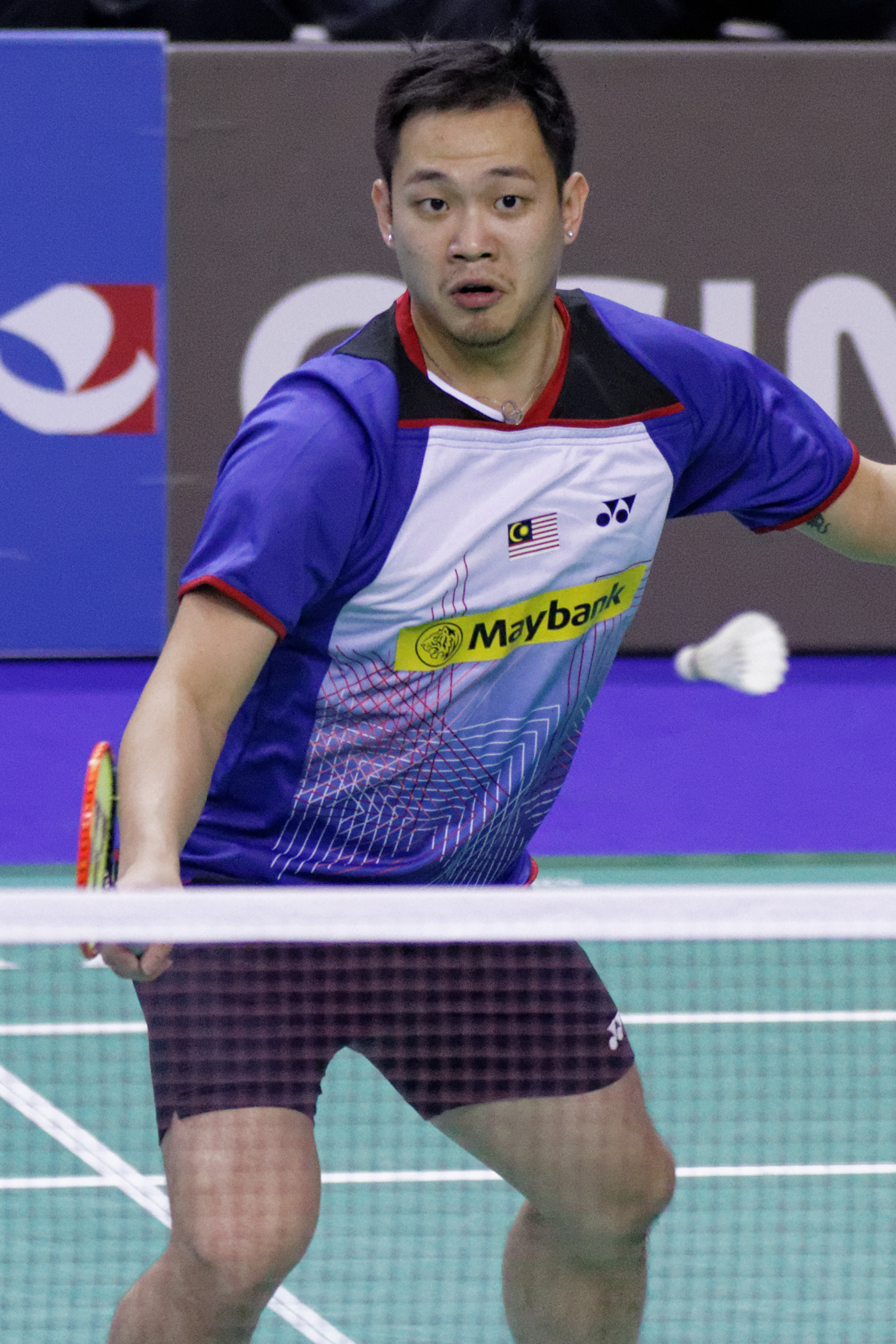
- Koo Kien Keat

Personal information
- Born: 18 September 1985 (age 41) Ipoh, Perak, Malaysia
- Years active: 2003–2016
- Height: 1.79 m (5 ft 10 in)
- Weight: 75 kg (165 lb; 11.8 st)

Sport
- Country: Malaysia
- Sport: Badminton
- Handedness: Right
- Retired: November 2016

Men's doubles
- Highest ranking: 1 (11 October 2007)
- BWF profile
Medal record
Men's badminton
Representing Malaysia
World Championships
Silver medal – second place	2010 Paris	Men's doubles
Bronze medal – third place	2005 Anaheim	Men's doubles
Bronze medal – third place	2006 Madrid	Mixed doubles
Bronze medal – third place	2009 Hyderabad	Men's doubles
Sudirman Cup
Bronze medal – third place	2009 Guangzhou	Mixed team
Thomas Cup
Bronze medal – third place	2006 Sendai & Tokyo	Men's team
Bronze medal – third place	2008 Jakarta	Men's team
Bronze medal – third place	2010 Kuala Lumpur	Men's team
Bronze medal – third place	2016 Kunshan	Men's team
Commonwealth Games
Gold medal – first place	2006 Melbourne	Men's doubles
Gold medal – first place	2006 Melbourne	Mixed team
Gold medal – first place	2010 Delhi	Men's doubles
Gold medal – first place	2010 Delhi	Mixed doubles
Gold medal – first place	2010 Delhi	Mixed team
Asian Games
Gold medal – first place	2006 Doha	Men's doubles
Silver medal – second place	2010 Guangzhou	Men's doubles
Bronze medal – third place	2006 Doha	Men's team
Asian Championships
Silver medal – second place	2007 Johor Bahru	Men's doubles
Bronze medal – third place	2008 Johor Bahru	Men's doubles
Southeast Asian Games
Gold medal – first place	2005 Manila	Men's team
Silver medal – second place	2009 Vientiane	Men's doubles
Silver medal – second place	2009 Vientiane	Men's team
Bronze medal – third place	2005 Manila	Men's doubles
Bronze medal – third place	2005 Manila	Mixed doubles
Bronze medal – third place	2009 Vientiane	Mixed doubles
World Junior Championships
Bronze medal – third place	2002 Pretoria	Boys' doubles
Asian Junior Championships
Gold medal – first place	2002 Kuala Lumpur	Boys' doubles
Bronze medal – third place	2002 Kuala Lumpur	Mixed doubles
Bronze medal – third place	2002 Kuala Lumpur	Boys' team

Koo Kien Keat
- Traditional Chinese: 古健傑
- Simplified Chinese: 古健杰
Transcriptions
Standard Mandarin
- Hanyu Pinyin: Gǔ Jiànjié
Yue: Cantonese
- Jyutping: Gu2 Gin6 Git6
Southern Min
- Hokkien POJ: Kó͘ Kiān-kia̍t

Koo Kien Keat AMN (Chinese: 古健傑; Pe̍h-ōe-jī: Kó͘ Kiān-kia̍t; born 18 September 1985) is a Malaysian former professional badminton player. He succeeded in both men's and mixed doubles and in his partnership with Tan Boon Heong he reached a career high ranking of world number 1.

== Career ==
In 2004, he played in the Thomas Cup with Chew Choon Eng. They gave a strong performance during the second doubles match against Flandy Limpele and Eng Hian of Indonesia in the quarter-finals. However, after the tournament, the Badminton Association of Malaysia decided to partner him with Chan Chong Ming who previously partnered Choon Eng. Later, they won the bronze medal at the 2005 World Championships.

In 2006, Koo's coach, Rexy Mainaky, decided to paired him with the hard-hitting left-hander Tan Boon Heong. Together, they won the gold medal at the 2006 Doha Asian Games as an unseeded pair. En route to the finals, they defeated several top pairs including Markis Kido and Hendra Setiawan of Indonesia. They are the youngest ever men's doubles pair to win an Asian Games gold medal at the age of 22 and 19 respectively. 2007 was the best year for Koo and Tan. They won several Superseries tournaments and climbed to the top of world rankings. They also won their first All England Superseries title after beating Chinese pair, Cai Yun and Fu Haifeng in straight games.

In 2009, the two won the bronze medal at the 2009 World Championships. At the 2010 BWF World Championships, the pair entered the semifinals after beating Korean rivals Jung Jae-sung and Lee Yong-dae. In the semifinals they defeated China's Guo Zhendong and Xu Chen 21-14, 21-18. Tan and Koo became the first Malaysian pair to enter a World Championship final in 13 years. In the finals, they played China's Cai Yun and Fu Haifeng but lost 21-18, 18-21, 14-21.

In 2010, they won their first title of the year in their home, Malaysia, as the world number 1 pair. They came in seeded number 1 in the All England Open but lost in the first round to Denmark former world champions Lars Paaske and Jonas Rasmussen.

In the 2010 BWF World Championships, they beat the young Chinese pair of Chai Biao and Zhang Nan in the quarter-finals and later their arch rivals, the South Koreans Jung Jae-sung and Lee Yong-dae, in 3 sets to reach the semi-finals. After that, they beat another Chinese pair of Guo Zhendong and Xu Chen to reach their first ever finals in World Championship. The only other Malaysian pair to reach that far before them were Cheah Soon Kit and Yap Kim Hock.

At the 2011 All England Open, Koo and Tan defeated 2008 Olympic champions Markis Kido and Hendra Setiawan in the quarterfinals. They then defeated World champions Cai Yun and Fu Haifeng 21-11, 23-21. They lost to the Danes and then world number 1 Mathias Boe and Carsten Mogensen 21-15, 18-21, 18-21.

In 2012, they competed at the 2012 London Olympics, reaching the semi-finals losing to the eventual gold medalists, and then losing in the bronze medal match to the Koreans. In 2013, they suffered a series of early round exits in 2013 and a three-year major title drought but managed to remain in the top 10 of the world rankings. In 2014, Koo parted with the Badminton Association of Malaysia and became a coach for the Granular Club of Thailand in early 2014. In August that year, Koo returned to play his last tournament with Tan at the 2014 BWF World Championships in Copenhagen, Denmark. Their supposedly last match together was in the third round where they lost to a Chinese Taipei pair with a score of 19-21 in the deciding game.

In 2015, Koo announced that he is coming out of retirement to qualify for the 2016 Rio Olympics with Tan before they call it quits for good. They were sponsored by Seri Mutiara Development Sdn Bhd and playing for an independent club. They achieved several breakthroughs this year, winning the Dutch Open and finishing as runners-up at the Thailand Open. They also made it to two Superseries quarterfinals in Australia and Korea.

In 2016, Koo and Tan managed to enter the top 15 of the world rankings. However, due to the new Olympic qualification requirement set by the BWF whereby each country can send two representatives for each event only if they are both in the top 8 of the world rankings in their discipline and if they are not then only the highest ranked representative will contest, Koo and Tan narrowly failed to qualify for the Olympics. By the time the qualification period had ended, the two were ranked world number 14, just one rank behind compatriots Goh V Shem and Tan Wee Kiong who were selected instead and went on to win the silver medal. In November, Koo re-announced his retirement from professional badminton, citing the Hong Kong Open as his last tournament.

== Achievements ==
=== BWF World Championships ===
Men's doubles
Year	Venue	Partner	Opponent	Score	Result
2005	Arrowhead Pond, Anaheim, United States	(Malaysia) Chan Chong Ming	(Indonesia) Sigit Budiarto (Indonesia) Candra Wijaya	9–15, 11–15	Bronze
2009	Gachibowli Indoor Stadium, Hyderabad, India	(Malaysia) Tan Boon Heong	(South Korea) Jung Jae-sung (South Korea) Lee Yong-dae	21–16, 14–21, 20–22	Bronze
2010	Stade Pierre de Coubertin, Paris, France	(Malaysia) Tan Boon Heong	(China) Cai Yun (China) Fu Haifeng	21–18, 18–21, 14–21	Silver

Mixed doubles
Year	Venue	Partner	Opponent	Score	Result
2006	Palacio de Deportes de la Comunidad, Madrid, Spain	(Malaysia) Wong Pei Tty	(England) Anthony Clark (England) Donna Kellogg	14–21, 12–21	Bronze

=== Commonwealth Games ===
Men's doubles
Year	Venue	Partner	Opponent	Score	Result
2006	Melbourne Convention and Exhibition Centre, Melbourne, Australia	(Malaysia) Chan Chong Ming	(Malaysia) Choong Tan Fook (Malaysia) Wong Choong Hann	21–13, 21–14	Gold
2010	Siri Fort Sports Complex, New Delhi, India	(Malaysia) Tan Boon Heong	(England) Anthony Clark (England) Nathan Robertson	21–19, 21–14	Gold

Mixed doubles
Year	Venue	Partner	Opponent	Score	Result
2010	Siri Fort Sports Complex, New Delhi, India	(Malaysia) Chin Eei Hui	(England) Nathan Robertson (England) Jenny Wallwork	22–20, 21–12	Gold

=== Asian Games ===
Men's doubles
Year	Venue	Partner	Opponent	Score	Result
2006	Aspire Hall 3, Doha, Qatar	(Malaysia) Tan Boon Heong	(Indonesia) Luluk Hadiyanto (Indonesia) Alvent Yulianto	21–13, 21–14	Gold
2010	Tianhe Gymnasium, Guangzhou, China	(Malaysia) Tan Boon Heong	(Indonesia) Markis Kido (Indonesia) Hendra Setiawan	21–16, 24–26, 19–21	Silver

=== Asian Championships ===
Men's doubles
Year	Venue	Partner	Opponent	Score	Result
2007	Bandaraya Stadium, Johor Bahru, Malaysia	(Malaysia) Tan Boon Heong	(Malaysia) Choong Tan Fook (Malaysia) Lee Wan Wah	14–21, 21–11, 12–21	Silver
2008	Bandaraya Stadium, Johor Bahru, Malaysia	(Malaysia) Tan Boon Heong	(South Korea) Jung Jae-sung (South Korea) Lee Yong-dae	21–16, 16–21, 18–21	Bronze

=== Southeast Asian Games ===
Men's doubles
Year	Venue	Partner	Opponent	Score	Result
2005	PhilSports Arena, Metro Manila, Philippines	(Malaysia) Chan Chong Ming	(Indonesia) Markis Kido (Indonesia) Hendra Setiawan	13–15, 13–15	Bronze
2009	Gym Hall 1, National Sports Complex, Vientiane, Laos	(Malaysia) Tan Boon Heong	(Indonesia) Markis Kido (Indonesia) Hendra Setiawan	17–21, 17–21	Silver

Mixed doubles
Year	Venue	Partner	Opponent	Score	Result
2005	PhilSports Arena, Metro Manila, Philippines	(Malaysia) Wong Pei Tty	(Indonesia) Anggun Nugroho (Indonesia) Yunita Tetty	9–15, 5–15	Bronze
2009	Gym Hall 1, National Sports Complex, Vientiane, Laos	(Malaysia) Wong Pei Tty	(Indonesia) Nova Widianto (Indonesia) Liliyana Natsir	15–21, 15–21	Bronze

=== World Junior Championships ===
Boys' doubles
Year	Venue	Partner	Opponent	Score	Result
2002	Pretoria Showgrounds, Pretoria, South Africa	(Malaysia) Ong Soon Hock	(South Korea) Han Sang-hoon (South Korea) Park Sung-hwan	15–7, 8–15, 4–15	Bronze

=== Asian Junior Championships ===
Boys' doubles
Year	Venue	Partner	Opponent	Score	Result
2002	Kuala Lumpur Badminton Stadium, Kuala Lumpur, Malaysia	(Malaysia) Ong Soon Hock	(South Korea) Han Sang-hoon (South Korea) Kim Dae-sung	15–13, 15–13	Gold

Mixed doubles
Year	Venue	Partner	Opponent	Score	Result
2002	Kuala Lumpur Badminton Stadium, Kuala Lumpur, Malaysia	(Malaysia) Wong Wai See	(China) Cao Chen (China) Rong Lu	4–11, 6–11	Bronze

=== BWF Superseries ===
The BWF Superseries, which was launched on 14 December 2006 and implemented in 2007, is a series of elite badminton tournaments, sanctioned by the Badminton World Federation (BWF). BWF Superseries levels are Superseries and Superseries Premier. A season of Superseries consists of twelve tournaments around the world that have been introduced since 2011. Successful players are invited to the Superseries Finals, which are held at the end of each year.

Men's doubles
Year	Tournament	Partner	Opponent	Score	Result
2007	Malaysia Open	(Malaysia) Tan Boon Heong	(United States) Tony Gunawan (Indonesia) Candra Wijaya	21–15, 21–18	(gold) Winner
2007	All England Open	(Malaysia) Tan Boon Heong	(China) Cai Yun (China) Fu Haifeng	21–15, 21–18	(gold) Winner
2007	Swiss Open	(Malaysia) Tan Boon Heong	(Denmark) Jens Eriksen (Denmark) Martin Lundgaard Hansen	17–21, 21–16, 21–12	(gold) Winner
2007	Denmark Open	(Malaysia) Tan Boon Heong	(Denmark) Jens Eriksen (Denmark) Martin Lundgaard Hansen	14–21, 21–14, 21–12	(gold) Winner
2008	World Superseries Masters Finals	(Malaysia) Tan Boon Heong	(South Korea) Jung Jae-sung (South Korea) Lee Yong-dae	21–18, 21–14	(gold) Winner
2009	Swiss Open	(Malaysia) Tan Boon Heong	(Denmark) Mathias Boe (Denmark) Carsten Mogensen	21–14, 21–18	(gold) Winner
2009	Denmark Open	(Malaysia) Tan Boon Heong	(Denmark) Mathias Boe (Denmark) Carsten Mogensen	20–22, 21–14, 21–17	(gold) Winner
2009	French Open	(Malaysia) Tan Boon Heong	(Indonesia) Markis Kido (Indonesia) Hendra Setiawan	21–15, 15–21, 14–21	(silver) Runner-up
2009	China Open	(Malaysia) Tan Boon Heong	(South Korea) Jung Jae-sung (South Korea) Lee Yong-dae	13–21, 21–19, 18–21	(silver) Runner-up
2010	Malaysia Open	(Malaysia) Tan Boon Heong	(China) Guo Zhendong (China) Xu Chen	21–15, 17–21, 21–16	(gold) Winner
2010	Swiss Open	(Malaysia) Tan Boon Heong	(South Korea) Ko Sung-hyun (South Korea) Yoo Yeon-seong	18–21, 16–21	(silver) Runner-up
2010	Japan Open	(Malaysia) Tan Boon Heong	(China) Cai Yun (China) Fu Haifeng	21–18, 14–21, 12–21	(silver) Runner-up
2011	All England Open	(Malaysia) Tan Boon Heong	(Denmark) Mathias Boe (Denmark) Carsten Mogensen	21–15, 18–21, 18–21	(silver) Runner-up
2012	Japan Open	(Malaysia) Tan Boon Heong	(South Korea) Kim Gi-jung (South Korea) Kim Sa-rang	16–21, 19–21	(silver) Runner-up
2012	Denmark Open	(Malaysia) Tan Boon Heong	(South Korea) Shin Baek-choel (South Korea) Yoo Yeon-seong	21–19, 11–21, 19–21	(silver) Runner-up
2012	Hong Kong Open	(Malaysia) Tan Boon Heong	(China) Cai Yun (China) Fu Haifeng	16–21, 17–21	(silver) Runner-up
2013	French Open	(Malaysia) Tan Boon Heong	(Indonesia) Marcus Fernaldi Gideon (Indonesia) Markis Kido	16–21, 18–21	(silver) Runner-up

BWF Super Series Finals tournament
BWF Super Series Premier tournament
BWF Super Series tournament

=== BWF Grand Prix ===
The BWF Grand Prix had two levels, the BWF Grand Prix and Grand Prix Gold. It was a series of badminton tournaments sanctioned by the Badminton World Federation (BWF) which was held from 2007 to 2017. The World Badminton Grand Prix has been sanctioned by the International Badminton Federation from 1983 to 2006.

Men's doubles
Year	Tournament	Partner	Opponent	Score	Result
2004	Chinese Taipei Open	(Malaysia) Chan Chong Ming	(Indonesia) Hendra Aprida Gunawan (Indonesia) Joko Riyadi	6–15, 15–13, 15–6	(gold) Winner
2005	Denmark Open	(Malaysia) Chan Chong Ming	(Denmark) Lars Paaske (Denmark) Jonas Rasmussen	15–6, 15–7	(gold) Winner
2006	Swiss Open	(Malaysia) Chan Chong Ming	(Denmark) Mathias Boe (Denmark) Carsten Mogensen	17–14, 8–15, 17–14	(gold) Winner
2006	Malaysia Open	(Malaysia) Chan Chong Ming	(Malaysia) Mohd Fairuzizuan Tazari (Malaysia) Lin Woon Fui	14–21, 21–11, 21–17	(gold) Winner
2006	Japan Open	(Malaysia) Tan Boon Heong	(United States) Tony Gunawan (Indonesia) Candra Wijaya	15–21, 14–21	(silver) Runner-up
2007	Philippines Open	(Malaysia) Tan Boon Heong	(China) Guo Zhendong (China) Xie Zhongbo	21–8, 26–24	(gold) Winner
2007	Macau Open	(Malaysia) Tan Boon Heong	(Malaysia) Choong Tan Fook (Malaysia) Lee Wan Wah	21–18, 17–21, 23–21	(gold) Winner
2008	Macau Open	(Malaysia) Tan Boon Heong	(Chinese Taipei) Fang Chieh-min (Chinese Taipei) Lee Sheng-mu	21–16, 21–18	(gold) Winner
2009	Malaysia Grand Prix Gold	(Malaysia) Tan Boon Heong	(Malaysia) Gan Teik Chai (Malaysia) Tan Bin Shen	21–11, 21–13	(gold) Winner
2009	Macau Open	(Malaysia) Tan Boon Heong	(Malaysia) Choong Tan Fook (Malaysia) Lee Wan Wah	21–14, 17–21, 21–12	(gold) Winner
2011	Malaysia Grand Prix Gold	(Malaysia) Tan Boon Heong	(Indonesia) Hendra Aprida Gunawan (Indonesia) Alvent Yulianto	21–16, 21–7	(gold) Winner
2012	Malaysia Grand Prix Gold	(Malaysia) Tan Boon Heong	(Malaysia) Chooi Kah Ming (Malaysia) Ow Yao Han	21–15, 21–19	(gold) Winner
2013	Malaysia Grand Prix Gold	(Malaysia) Tan Boon Heong	(Malaysia) Goh V Shem (Malaysia) Lim Khim Wah	20–22, 15–21	(silver) Runner-up
2015	Thailand Open	(Malaysia) Tan Boon Heong	(Indonesia) Wahyu Nayaka (Indonesia) Ade Yusuf	22–20, 21–23, 16–21	(silver) Runner-up
2015	Dutch Open	(Malaysia) Tan Boon Heong	(India) Manu Attri (India) B. Sumeeth Reddy	21–15, 21–10	(gold) Winner
2016	Malaysia Masters	(Malaysia) Tan Boon Heong	(Indonesia) Marcus Fernaldi Gideon (Indonesia) Kevin Sanjaya Sukamuljo	21–18, 13–21, 18–21	(silver) Runner-up
2016	Vietnam Open	(Malaysia) Tan Boon Heong	(Chinese Taipei) Lee Jhe-huei (Chinese Taipei) Lee Yang	21–18, 14–21, 7–21	(silver) Runner-up

Mixed doubles
Year	Tournament	Partner	Opponent	Score	Result
2004	Singapore Open	(Malaysia) Wong Pei Tty	(Indonesia) Nova Widianto (Indonesia) Liliyana Natsir	1–15, 4–15	(silver) Runner-up
2004	Chinese Taipei Open	(Malaysia) Wong Pei Tty	(Indonesia) Muhammad Rijal (Indonesia) Endang Nursugianti	15–3, 15–5	(gold) Winner

BWF Grand Prix Gold tournament
BWF Grand Prix tournament

=== BWF International Challenge/Series ===
Men's doubles
Year	Tournament	Partner	Opponent	Score	Result
2002	Smiling Fish Satellite	(Malaysia) Ong Soon Hock	(Indonesia) Hendry Kurniawan Saputra (Indonesia) Denny Setiawan	2–7, 5–7, 5–7	(silver) Runner-up
2003	Malaysia Satellite	(Malaysia) Gan Teik Chai	(Malaysia) Hong Chieng Hun (Malaysia) Lin Woon Fui	15–7, 17–16	(gold) Winner
2004	French International	(Malaysia) Gan Teik Chai	(Denmark) Joachim Fischer Nielsen (Denmark) Jesper Larsen	15–6, 17–15	(gold) Winner
2015	Sri Lanka International	(Malaysia) Tan Boon Heong	(Malaysia) Chooi Kah Ming (Malaysia) Ow Yao Han	21–19, 21–17	(gold) Winner
2015	White Nights	(Malaysia) Tan Boon Heong	(England) Marcus Ellis (England) Chris Langridge	21–10, 21–12	(gold) Winner
2015	Swiss International	(Malaysia) Tan Boon Heong	(England) Peter Briggs (England) Tom Wolfenden	18–21, 21–16, 21–16	(gold) Winner

BWF International Challenge tournament
BWF International Series tournament

== Honours ==
- Member of the Order of the Defender of the Realm (A.M.N.) (2006).
