= Guo Zhendong =

Chinese badminton player (born 1984)

Guo Zhendong 郭振东
Personal information
- Born: 4 August 1984 (age 42) Shashi, Jingzhou, Hubei, China
- Height: 1.78 m (5 ft 10 in)
- Weight: 68 kg (150 lb)

Sport
- Country: China
- Sport: Badminton
- Handedness: Right

Men's doubles
- Highest ranking: 3 (with Xu Chen 8 July 2010)
- BWF profile
Medal record
Men's badminton
Representing China
World Championships
Bronze medal – third place	2010 Paris	Men's doubles
World Cup
Bronze medal – third place	2006 Yiyang	Men's doubles
Sudirman Cup
Gold medal – first place	2011 Qingdao	Mixed team
Gold medal – first place	2009 Guangzhou	Mixed team
Gold medal – first place	2007 Glasgow	Mixed team
Thomas Cup
Gold medal – first place	2012 Wuhan	Men's team
Gold medal – first place	2010 Kuala Lumpur	Men's team
Gold medal – first place	2008 Jakarta	Men's team
Gold medal – first place	2006 Sendai & Tokyo	Men's team
Asian Games
Gold medal – first place	2010 Guangzhou	Men's team
Gold medal – first place	2006 Doha	Men's team
Asian Championships
Bronze medal – third place	2012 Qingdao	Men's doubles
Bronze medal – third place	2011 Chengdu	Men's doubles
World Junior Championships
Gold medal – first place	2002 Pretoria	Mixed doubles
Gold medal – first place	2002 Pretoria	Mixed team

Guo Zhendong (Chinese: 郭振东; pinyin: Guō Zhèndōng; born 4 August 1984) is a badminton player from China. As of July 2010, he (along with his partner Xu Chen) was ranked within the top 10 male badminton doubles teams in the world. He competed at the 2008 and 2012 Olympic Games.

== Career ==
A men's doubles specialist, Guo has played on the world circuit since 2005, mainly in partnership with Xie Zhongbo. They have won the 2004 Polish Open, the 2005 China Masters and the 2008 India Open titles together, and Guo won the Austrian International title in 2007 with He Hanbin. Guo and Xie were quarterfinalists at the 2007 BWF World Championships. At the 2008 Olympics in Beijing they lost a tight round of 16 duel to the eventual gold medalists, Markis Kido and Hendra Setiawan of Indonesia. Guo is a member of China's world champion Thomas Cup (men's international) team.

== Achievements ==
=== BWF World Championships ===
Men's doubles
Year	Venue	Partner	Opponent	Score	Result
2010	Stade Pierre de Coubertin, Paris, France	(China) Xu Chen	(Malaysia) Koo Kien Keat (Malaysia) Tan Boon Heong	14–21, 18–21	Bronze

=== World Cup ===
Men's doubles
Year	Venue	Partner	Opponent	Score	Result
2006	Olympic Park, Yiyang, China	(China) Xie Zhongbo	(Indonesia) Markis Kido (Indonesia) Hendra Setiawan	19–21, 13–21	Bronze

=== Asian Championships ===
Men's doubles
Year	Venue	Partner	Opponent	Score	Result
2012	Qingdao Sports Centre Conson Stadium; Qingdao, China	(China) Chai Biao	(South Korea) Kim Ki-jung (South Korea) Kim Sa-rang	17–21, 9–21	Bronze
2011	Sichuan Gymnasium; Chengdu, China	(China) Chai Biao	(Japan) Hirokatsu Hashimoto (Japan) Noriyasu Hirata	14–21, 19–21	Bronze

=== World Junior Championships ===
Mixed doubles
Year	Venue	Partner	Opponent	Score	Result
2002	Pretoria Showgrounds; Pretoria, South Africa	(China) Yu Yang	(China) Cao Chen (China) Rong Lu	11–2, 11–1	Gold

=== BWF Superseries ===
The BWF Superseries, launched on 14 December 2006 and implemented in 2007, is a series of elite badminton tournaments, sanctioned by Badminton World Federation (BWF). BWF Superseries has two level such as Superseries and Superseries Premier. A season of Superseries features twelve tournaments around the world, which introduced since 2011, with successful players invited to the Superseries Finals held at the year end.

Men's doubles
Year	Tournament	Partner	Opponent	Score	Result
2011	World Superseries Finals	(China) Chai Biao	(Denmark) Mathias Boe (Denmark) Carsten Mogensen	23–25, 7–21	(silver) Runner-up
2011	Indonesia Open	(China) Chai Biao	(China) Cai Yun (China) Fu Haifeng	13–21, 12–21	(silver) Runner-up
2011	Malaysia Open	(China) Chai Biao	(Denmark) Mads Conrad-Petersen (Denmark) Jonas Rasmussen	21–16, 21–14	(gold) Winner
2010	Malaysia Open	(China) Xu Chen	(Malaysia) Koo Kean Keat (Malaysia) Tan Boon Heong	15–21, 21–17, 16–21	(silver) Runner-up
2009	China Masters	(China) Xu Chen	(China) Cai Yun (China) Fu Haifeng	Walkover	(gold) Winner
2007	China Open	(China) Xie Zhongbo	(Indonesia) Markis Kido (Indonesia) Hendra Setiawan	12–21, 19–21	(silver) Runner-up

BWF Super Series Finals tournament
BWF Super Series Premier tournament
BWF Super Series tournament

=== BWF Grand Prix ===
The BWF Grand Prix has two levels, the BWF Grand Prix and Grand Prix Gold. It is a series of badminton tournaments sanctioned by the Badminton World Federation (BWF) since 2007. The World Badminton Grand Prix has been sanctioned by the International Badminton Federation since 1983.

Men's doubles
Year	Tournament	Partner	Opponent	Score	Result
2011	Macau Open	(China) Chai Biao	(South Korea) Ko Sung-hyun (South Korea) Yoo Yeon-seong	21–19, 21–19	(gold) Winner
2008	Thailand Open	(China) Xie Zhongbo	(China) Cai Yun (China) Fu Haifeng	17–21, Retired	(silver) Runner-up
2008	India Open	(China) Xie Zhongbo	(Malaysia) Chan Chong Ming (Malaysia) Chew Choon Eng	19–21, 21–14, 21–12	(gold) Winner
2007	Philippines Open	(China) Xie Zhongbo	(Malaysia) Koo Kien Keat (Malaysia) Tan Boon Heong	8–21, 24–26	(silver) Runner-up
2006	Macau Open	(China) Zheng Bo	(China) Cai Yun (China) Fu Haifeng	12–21, 21–9, 19–21	(silver) Runner-up
2005	China Masters	(China) Xie Zhongbo	(Malaysia) Choong Tan Fook (Malaysia) Lee Wan Wah	15–10, 15–4	(gold) Winner

BWF Grand Prix Gold tournament
BWF Grand Prix tournament

=== BWF International Challenge/Series ===
Men's singles
Year	Tournament	Opponent	Score	Result
2001	China International	(China) Guo Jianhua	3–15, 8–15	(silver) Runner-up

Men's doubles
Year	Tournament	Partner	Opponent	Score	Result
2007	Austrian International	(China) He Hanbin	(Russia) Vitalij Durkin (Russia) Alexandr Nikolaenko	21–15, 19–21, 21–17	(gold) Winner
2004	Polish International	(China) Xie Zhongbo	(Poland) Michał Łogosz (Poland) Robert Mateusiak	8–15, 17–14, 17–14	(gold) Winner

BWF International Challenge tournament
BWF International Series tournament
