= Herry Iman Pierngadi =

Indonesian badminton coach

Herry Iman Pierngadi 彭伟信
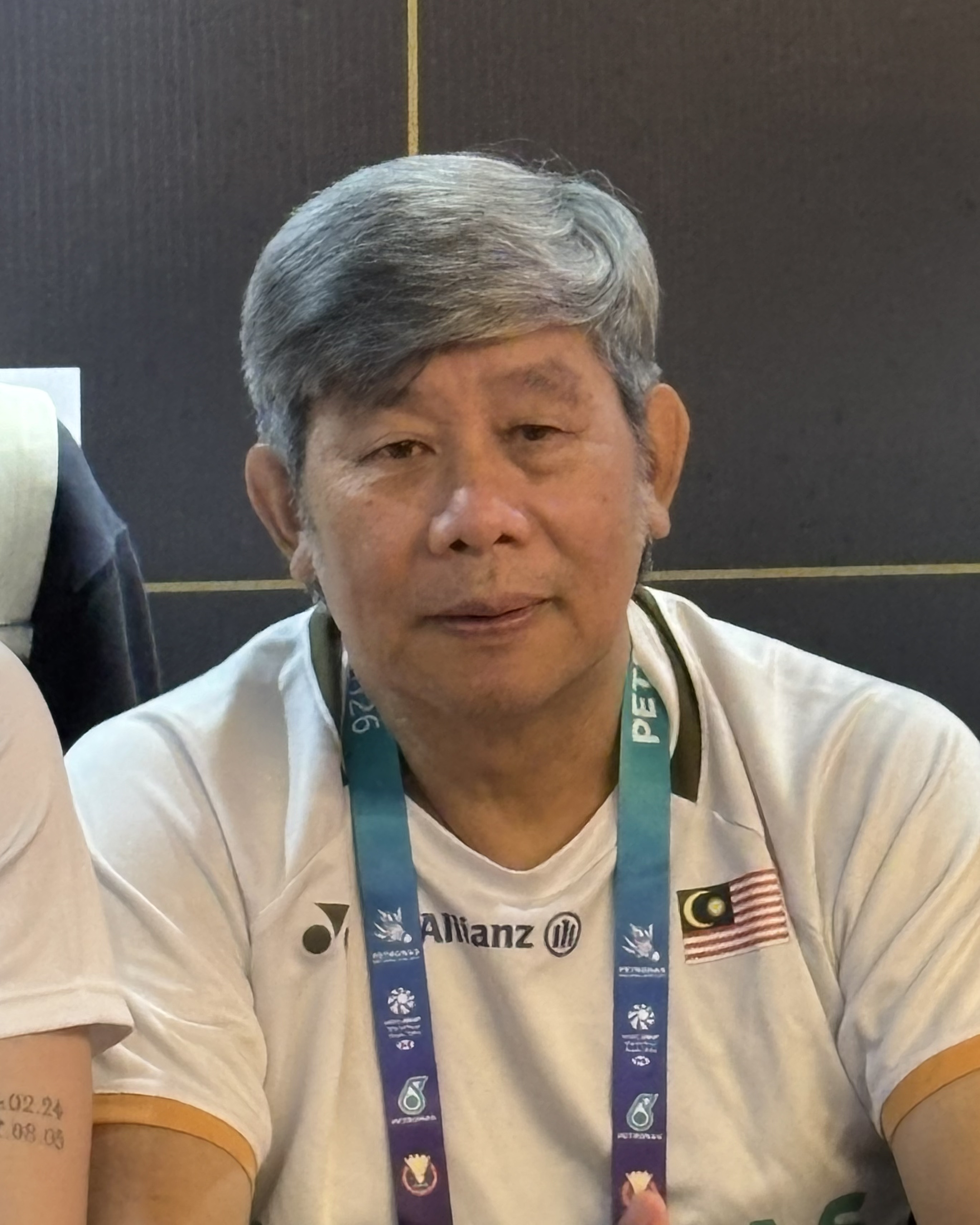
- Pierngadi during the 2026 Malaysia Open

Personal information
- Nickname: Herry Ip
- Born: 21 August 1962 (age 63) Pangkal Pinang, Indonesia

Sport
- Country: Indonesia
- Sport: Badminton
- Handedness: Right
- Event: Men's doubles

Herry Iman Pierngadi (born 21 August 1962) is a former Indonesian badminton coach specialised in men's doubles. He is known for having trained seven world champions. He has served as the men's doubles head coach of the Malaysia national badminton team since 1 February 2025.

== Career ==
Herry joined the National Board of the Indonesian Badminton Association (PBSI) since 1993. The badminton trainer initially handled the Pratama National squad of Indonesia of the upcoming talents. Starting in 1999 he became the main trainer and coach for men's doubles at the National training center Pelatnas Cipayung, taking over from Christian Hadinata who became the Director of National Pelatnas of PBSI. When he started his job as a coach at the National training office, Herry was still a PB Tangkas club coach. But then he decided to let go his club ties to choose the status as a free independent coach with no conflicts of interest. In fact, Herry was not even worried when he was cut off from the National Board of PBSI in 2007. At that time, the male doubles coaching was entrusted to Sigit Pamungkas. Without responsibilities at the National training center until 2011, Herry chose his time for activities outside of badminton. He spent most of his time with his hobby of bird chirping and aviary business.

When he was first badminton trainer in Cipayung in the period from 1993 to 2008 he produced a number of world-class men's doubles pairs. For instance Candra Wijaya / Tony Gunawan (1999 All England champions and 2000 Olympic champions), then Candra Wijaya / Sigit Budiarto (2003 All England & 1997 World Champions), and Flandy Limpele / Eng Hian (2004 Olympic bronze medalist). He returned to Cipayung in 2011 after a few years absence to replace Sigit Pamungkas again. At that time, the Indonesian men's doubles sector was experiencing a little decline in achievements. Regeneration didn't happen as smooth at first as when Ricky Subagja / Rexy Mainaky played and their success was continued by Candra Wijaya / Sigit Budiarto in the period of his first term as National coach. The mainstay pair of Markis Kido / Hendra Setiawan actually left the National training when he returned. Slowly but surely, Herry began to show his positive influence and increased the Indonesian men's double achievements once again. The return of Hendra Setiawan to the national training was also an important milestone. He was then paired with Mohammad Ahsan who was previously a duet with Bona Septano. Unexpectedly, this new couple skyrocketed in a short time.

Hendra Setiawan / Mohammad Ahsan also won the BWF World Championships title in 2013, 2015 and 2019. They also won the famous All England Open title in 2014 and 2019, and won a gold medal at the 2014 Asian Games. His most recent protégés are Marcus Fernaldi Gideon and Kevin Sanjaya Sukamuljo the current worlds number one pair who won the All England Open title two years in a row in 2017 & 2018 and also a gold medal at the 2018 Asian Games. As men's doubles head coach of PBSI Herry now slowly transfers his men's doubles coaching duties at different selected tournaments to assistant coach Aryono Miranat with whom he works intensively together. At the end of 2018 veteran coach Herry Iman Pierngadi received the Indonesian Sports Award as "Coach of the Year".

== Awards and nominations ==
Award	Year	Category	Result	Ref.
Indonesian Sport Awards	2018	Coach of the Year	Won	
Santini JebreeetMedia Awards	2023	Favorite Coach	Nominated	

== Personal life ==
Herry does not have the experience as a former top badminton player. He has his trainers' license and has a diploma of education at IKIP Jakarta, now Jakarta State University (UNJ). His wife is Loa Kim Fun and they have three children: Stevanus Iman Pierngadi, Cintia Maria, and Karen Aprilia.
