= 2011 Japan Super Series =

Tournament details
- Dates: September 20, 2011 - September 25, 2011
- Total prize money: US$200,000
- Location: Tokyo, Japan

The 2011 Japan Super Series was the eighth super series tournament of the 2011 BWF Super Series in badminton. The tournament was held in Tokyo, Japan, from 20 to 25 September 2011 and had a total purse of $200,000.

== Men's singles ==
=== Seeds ===
1. (Malaysia) Lee Chong Wei (final)
2. (China) Lin Dan (withdrew)
3. (Denmark) Peter Gade (semifinals)
4. (China) Chen Long (champion)
5. (Indonesia) Taufik Hidayat (first round)
6. (China) Chen Jin (quarterfinal)
7. (Vietnam) Nguyen Tien Minh (first round)
8. (China) Du Pengyu (first round)

=== Top half ===
First Round
1	(Malaysia) Lee C W	21	21
(England) R Ouseph	13	13
(Hong Kong) Wong W K	21	13
(China) Wang ZM	23	21
5	(Indonesia) T Hidayat	17	21	18
Q4	(Chinese Taipei) Chou T-c	21	12	21
(Hong Kong) Chan Y K	12	13
(Japan) K Tago	21	21
3	(Denmark) P Gade	21	21
(Germany) M Zwiebler	15	18
(South Korea) Shon W-h	21	21
(Denmark) H-K Vittinghus	13	11
7	(Vietnam) Nguyen T M	18	19
(India) A Jayaram	21	21
Q3	(Japan) S Wada	14	14
(Indonesia) S Santoso	21	21

Second Round
1	(Malaysia) Lee C W	21	21
(China) Wang ZM	19	14
Q4	(Chinese Taipei) Chou T-c	17	11
(Japan) K Tago	21	21
3	(Denmark) P Gade	21	21
(South Korea) Shon W-h	17	17
(India) A Jayaram	20	16
(Indonesia) S Santoso	22	21

Quarterfinals
1	(Malaysia) Lee C W	21	21	21
(Japan) K Tago	23	7	18
3	(Denmark) P Gade	21	21
(Indonesia) S Santoso	14	15

Semifinals
1	(Malaysia) Lee C W	21	21
3	(Denmark) P Gade	13	16

=== Bottom half ===
First Round
(Denmark) J Ø Jørgensen	21	21
(Thailand) B Ponsana	16	19
(Indonesia) D H Rumbaka	21	21
8	(China) Du PY	10	16
Q2	(Thailand) S Avihingsanon	18	15
Q1	(Japan) T Ueda	21	21
(Japan) K Yamada	14	20
4	(China) Chen L	21	22
(Denmark) V Axelsen	21	14	14
(India) K Parupalli	19	21	21
(Japan) S Sasaki	12	15
6	(China) Chen J	21	21
(Hong Kong) Hu Y	17	21	21
(Indonesia) T Sugiarto	21	15	16
(South Korea) Lee H-i	16	21	12
2	(China) Lin D	21	11	21

Second Round
(Denmark) J Ø Jørgensen	21	21
(Indonesia) D H Rumbaka	14	16
Q1	(Japan) T Ueda	15	21	19
4	(China) Chen L	21	15	21
(India) K Parupalli	15	21	18
6	(China) Chen J	21	6	21
(Hong Kong) Hu Y	19	21	18
2	(China) Lin D	21	11	21

Quarterfinals
(Denmark) J Ø Jørgensen	14	13
4	(China) Chen L	21	21
6	(China) Chen J	22	14	20
2	(China) Lin D	20	21	22

Semifinals
4	(China) Chen L	w	/	o
2	(China) Lin D

=== Finals ===
Semifinals
1	(Malaysia) Lee Chong Wei	21	21
3	(Denmark) Peter Gade	13	16
4	(China) Chen Long	w	/	o
2	(China) Lin Dan

Final
1	(Malaysia) Lee Chong Wei	8	21	19
4	(China) Chen Long	21	10	21

== Women's singles ==
=== Seeds ===
1. (China) Wang Yihan
2. (China) Wang Shixian (quarterfinal)
3. (China) Wang Xin (second round)
4. (India) Saina Nehwal
5. (Denmark) Tine Baun (quarterfinal)
6. (China) Liu Xin
7. (Chinese Taipei) Cheng Shao-Chieh (first round)
8. (Germany) Juliane Schenk

=== Top half ===
First Round
1	(China) Wang YH	21	21
(Netherlands) Yao J	14	8
(South Korea) Sung J-h	20	21	21
(Japan) E Hirose	22	14	17
5	(Denmark) T Baun	19	21	21
Q1	(Hong Kong) Tse Y S	21	7	17
Q2	(Thailand) S Taerattanachai	21	15	18
(Indonesia) M F Kusumastuti	13	21	21
3	(China) Wang X	21	21
(South Korea) Bae Y-j	8	9
(Chinese Taipei) Tai T-y	21	21
(Indonesia) A Firdasari	13	18
6	(China) Liu X	21	21
(Hong Kong) Yip P Y	15	17
(Indonesia) L Fanetri	14	17
Q3	(Japan) N Okuhara	21	21

Second Round
1	(China) Wang YH	21	21
(South Korea) Sung J-h	19	14
5	(Denmark) T Baun	21	13	21
(Indonesia) M F Kusumastuti	18	21	10
3	(China) Wang X	13	21	20
(Chinese Taipei) Tai T-y	21	16	22
6	(China) Liu X	18	21	21
Q3	(Japan) N Okuhara	21	7	19

Quarterfinals
1	(China) Wang YH	21	14	21
5	(Denmark) T Baun	17	21	15
(Chinese Taipei) Tai T-y	20	15
6	(China) Liu X	22	21

Semifinals
1	(China) Wang YH	w	/	o
6	(China) Liu X

=== Bottom half ===
First Round
(Bulgaria) P Nedelcheva	4	21	12
(Singapore) Gu J	21	13	21
(Japan) S Sato	21	11
7	(Chinese Taipei) Cheng S-c	15	4^{r}
(Singapore) Fu MT	21	21
(Thailand) S Ponsana	15	15
(Thailand) R Inthanon	17	10
4	(India) S Nehwal	21	21
(Japan) A Kurihara	11	19
(Indonesia) A Yuswandari	21	21
(Japan) A Goto	10	8
8	(Germany) J Schenk	21	21
Q4	(Japan) M Mitani	21	12	21
(Thailand) P Buranaprasertsuk	18	21	19
(France) Pi HY	9	21	11
2	(China) Wang SX	21	12	21

Second Round
(Singapore) Gu J	21	11	21
(Japan) S Sato	16	21	19
(Singapore) Fu MT	17	16
4	(India) S Nehwal	21	21
(Indonesia) A Yuswandari	21	14	20
8	(Germany) J Schenk	16	21	22
Q4	(Japan) M Mitani	16	12
2	(China) Wang SX	21	21

Quarterfinals
(Singapore) Gu J	17	13
4	(India) S Nehwal	21	21
8	(Germany) J Schenk	21	21
2	(China) Wang SX	15	19

Semifinals
4	(India) S Nehwal	19	10
8	(Germany) J Schenk	21	21

=== Finals ===
Semifinals
1	(China) Wang Yihan	w	/	o
6	(China) Liu Xin
4	(India) Saina Nehwal	19	10
8	(Germany) Juliane Schenk	21	21

Final
1	(China) Wang Yihan	21	21
8	(Germany) Juliane Schenk	16	14

== Men's doubles ==
=== Seeds ===
1. (China) Cai Yun / Fu Haifeng
2. (Denmark) Mathias Boe / Carsten Mogensen (first round)
3. (Malaysia) Koo Kien Keat / Tan Boon Heong
4. (Indonesia) Mohammad Ahsan / Bona Septano
5. (South Korea) Jung Jae-sung / Yoo Yeon-seong (first round, retired)
6. (Indonesia) Markis Kido / Hendra Setiawan
7. (Indonesia) Alvent Yulianto Chandra / Hendra Aprida Gunawan (quarterfinal)
8. (Japan) Hirokatsu Hashimoto / Noriyasu Hirata (first round)

=== Top half ===
First Round
1	(China) Cai Y (China) Fu HF	21	21
(Chinese Taipei) Chen H-l (Chinese Taipei) Lin Y-l	13	16
(Germany) I Kindervater (Germany) J Schöttler	20	19
Q2	(Chinese Taipei) Liao M-c (Chinese Taipei) Wu C-w	22	21
7	(Indonesia) A Y Chandra (Indonesia) H A Gunawan	21	21
(China) Hong W (China) Shen Y	16	14
(Indonesia) A Pratama (Indonesia) R A Saputro	13	17
(South Korea) Cho G-w (South Korea) Kwon Y-g	21	21
3	(Malaysia) Koo K K (Malaysia) Tan B H	21	21
Q4	(Japan) H Saeki (Japan) R Taohata	10	8
(Japan) Y Hirobe (Japan) K Kazuno	21	21
(Netherlands) R Bosch (Netherlands) K Ridder	9	8
8	(Japan) H Hashimoto (Japan) N Hirata	23	15	18
(China) Chai B (China) Guo ZD	21	21	21
(South Korea) Kim K-j (South Korea) Shin B-c	20	19
(Malaysia) Goh W S (Malaysia) Lim K W	22	21

Second Round
1	(China) Cai Y (China) Fu HF	21	21
Q2	(Chinese Taipei) Liao M-c (Chinese Taipei) Wu C-w	16	13
7	(Indonesia) A Y Chandra (Indonesia) H A Gunawan	21	14	21
(South Korea) Cho G-w (South Korea) Kwon Y-g	19	21	15
3	(Malaysia) Koo K K (Malaysia) Tan B H	17	21	21
(Japan) Y Hirobe (Japan) K Kazuno	21	11	18
(China) Chai B (China) Guo ZD	21	19	19
(Malaysia) Goh W S (Malaysia) Lim K W	19	21	21

Quarterfinals
1	(China) Cai Y (China) Fu HF	21	21
7	(Indonesia) A Y Chandra (Indonesia) H A Gunawan	12	14
3	(Malaysia) Koo K K (Malaysia) Tan B H	21	19	21
(Malaysia) Goh W S (Malaysia) Lim K W	16	21	17

Semifinals
1	(China) Cai Y (China) Fu HF	21	19	21
3	(Malaysia) Koo K K (Malaysia) Tan B H	17	21	19

=== Bottom half ===
First Round
(Thailand) B Issara (Thailand) M Jongjit	21	19	21
(United States) H Bach (United States) T Gunawan	19	21	18
(China) Liu XL (China) Qiu ZH	21	11
5	(South Korea) Jung J-s (South Korea) Yoo Y-s	14	8^{r}
(Chinese Taipei) Fang C-m (Chinese Taipei) Lee S-m	21	21
(England) C Adcock (England) A Ellis	17	8
(Japan) H Endo (Japan) K Hayakawa	21	17	16
4	(Indonesia) M Ahsan (Indonesia) B Septano	15	21	21
(Thailand) S Anugritayawon (Thailand) S Prapakamol	10	22	21
(Denmark) M Conrad-Petersen (Denmark) J Rasmussen	21	20	19
(India) K.T. R Kumar (India) S Thomas	13	12
6	(Indonesia) M Kido (Indonesia) H Setiawan	21	21
Q1	(Thailand) P Chalardchaleam (Thailand) N Puangpuapech	8	16
Q3	(South Korea) Ko S-h (South Korea) Lee Y-d	21	21
(Japan) N Kawamae (Japan) S Sato	21	21
2	(Denmark) M Boe (Denmark) C Mogensen	15	18

Second Round
(Thailand) B Issara (Thailand) M Jongjit	21	21	20
(China) Liu XL (China) Qiu ZH	17	23	22
(Chinese Taipei) Fang C-m (Chinese Taipei) Lee S-m	15	21	16
4	(Indonesia) M Ahsan (Indonesia) B Septano	21	18	21
(Thailand) S Anugritayawon (Thailand) S Prapakamol	7	19
6	(Indonesia) M Kido (Indonesia) H Setiawan	21	21
Q3	(South Korea) Ko S-h (South Korea) Lee Y-d	21	21
(Japan) N Kawamae (Japan) S Sato	16	15

Quarterfinals
(China) Liu XL (China) Qiu ZH	5	16
4	(Indonesia) M Ahsan (Indonesia) B Septano	21	21
6	(Indonesia) M Kido (Indonesia) H Setiawan	21	15	21
Q3	(South Korea) Ko S-h (South Korea) Lee Y-d	10	21	14

Semifinals
4	(Indonesia) M Ahsan (Indonesia) B Septano	15	21	21
6	(Indonesia) M Kido (Indonesia) H Setiawan	21	16	18

=== Finals ===
Semifinals
1	(China) Cai Yun (China) Fu Haifeng	21	19	21
3	(Malaysia) Koo Kien Keat (Malaysia) Tan Boon Heong	17	21	19
4	(Indonesia) Mohammad Ahsan (Indonesia) Bona Septano	15	21	21
6	(Indonesia) Markis Kido (Indonesia) Hendra Setiawan	21	16	18

Final
1	(China) Cai Yun (China) Fu Haifeng	21	23
4	(Indonesia) Mohammad Ahsan (Indonesia) Bona Septano	13	21

== Women's doubles ==
=== Seeds ===
1. (China) Wang Xiaoli / Yu Yang (withdrew)
2. (Japan) Miyuki Maeda / Satoko Suetsuna (first round)
3. (Japan) Mizuki Fujii / Reika Kakiiwa
4. (China) Tian Qing / Zhao Yunlei (second round)
5. (Chinese Taipei) Cheng Wen-hsing / Chien Yu-chin
6. (Japan) Shizuka Matsuo / Mami Naito
7. (South Korea) Ha Jung-eun / Kim Min-jung (quarterfinal)
8. (Indonesia) Meiliana Jauhari / Greysia Polii (second round)

=== Top half ===
First Round
PFQ	(Japan) N Fukuman (Japan) K Yonao	21	14	11
(Japan) M Ichimaru (Japan) S Tanaka	14	21	21
(South Korea) Eom H-w (South Korea) Jang Y-n	21	21
(Singapore) Fu MT (Singapore) Xing AY	19	12
5	(Chinese Taipei) Cheng W-h (Chinese Taipei) Chien Y-c	21	21
Q2	(Japan) Y Itagaki (Japan) C Tamura	13	11
(Japan) Y Koharu (Japan) Y Miki	21	21
PFQ	(Chinese Taipei) Chen H-h (Chinese Taipei) Pai H-m	7	15
4	(China) Tian Q (China) Zhao YL	18	21	21
(Indonesia) V Marissa (Indonesia) N Melati	21	9	18
(Japan) M Matsutomo (Japan) A Takahashi	15	15
(Denmark) C Pedersen (Denmark) K Rytter Juhl	21	21
8	(Indonesia) M Jauhari (Indonesia) G Polii	21	21
Q3	(Macau) Lei S C (Macau) Mak K L	8	19
(China) Cheng S (China) Pan P	18	17
(Hong Kong) Poon L Y (Hong Kong) Tse Y S	21	21

Second Round
(Japan) M Ichimaru (Japan) S Tanaka	22	20	15
(South Korea) Eom H-w (South Korea) Jang Y-n	20	22	21
5	(Chinese Taipei) Cheng W-h (Chinese Taipei) Chien Y-c	14	21	21
(Japan) Y Koharu (Japan) Y Miki	21	14	7
4	(China) Tian Q (China) Zhao YL	11	20
(Denmark) C Pedersen (Denmark) K Rytter Juhl	21	22
8	(Indonesia) M Jauhari (Indonesia) G Polii	7^{r}
(Hong Kong) Poon L Y (Hong Kong) Tse Y S	17

Quarterfinals
(South Korea) Eom H-w (South Korea) Jang Y-n	17	8
5	(Chinese Taipei) Cheng W-h (Chinese Taipei) Chien Y-c	21	21
(Denmark) C Pedersen (Denmark) K Rytter Juhl	21	12	15
(Hong Kong) Poon L Y (Hong Kong) Tse Y S	11	21	21

Semifinals
5	(Chinese Taipei) Cheng W-h (Chinese Taipei) Chien Y-c	21	21
(Hong Kong) Poon L Y (Hong Kong) Tse Y S	17	16

=== Bottom half ===
First Round
(Chinese Taipei) Chang H-y (Chinese Taipei) Lai C-w	8	17
(India) J Gutta (India) A Ponnappa	21	21
(Chinese Taipei) Hsieh P-c (Chinese Taipei) Wang P-r	19	13
7	(South Korea) Ha J-e (South Korea) Kim M-j	21	21
(Indonesia) A F Agustin (Indonesia) N K Maheswari	17	21	21
(England) J Wallwork (England) G White	21	7	13
(Thailand) S Amitrapai (Thailand) N Somsri	13	12
3	(Japan) M Fujii (Japan) R Kakiiwa	21	21
(South Korea) Jung K-e (South Korea) Kim H-n	21	21
PFQ	(Thailand) L Narissapat (Thailand) S Thoungthongkam	12	14
(Thailand) D Aroonkesorn (Thailand) K Voravichitchaikul	12	19
6	(Japan) S Matsuo (Japan) M Naito	21	21
(Netherlands) L Jonathans (Netherlands) P van Dooremalen	21	21
(Russia) V Sorokina (Russia) N Vislova	17	18
(China) Bao YX (China) Zhong QX	21	21
2	(Japan) M Maeda (Japan) S Suetsuna	13	17

Second Round
(India) J Gutta (India) A Ponnappa	9	21	22
7	(South Korea) Ha J-e (South Korea) Kim M-j	21	18	24
(Indonesia) A F Agustin (Indonesia) N K Maheswari	21	17	18
3	(Japan) M Fujii (Japan) R Kakiiwa	11	21	21
(South Korea) Jung K-e (South Korea) Kim H-n	11	18
6	(Japan) S Matsuo (Japan) M Naito	21	21
(Netherlands) L Jonathans (Netherlands) P van Dooremalen	13	9
(China) Bao YX (China) Zhong QX	21	21

Quarterfinals
7	(South Korea) Ha J-e (South Korea) Kim M-j	12	21	16
3	(Japan) M Fujii (Japan) R Kakiiwa	21	9	21
6	(Japan) S Matsuo (Japan) M Naito	21	20	19
(China) Bao YX (China) Zhong QX	18	22	21

Semifinals
3	(Japan) M Fujii (Japan) R Kakiiwa	21	22	15
(China) Bao YX (China) Zhong QX	17	24	21

=== Finals ===
Semifinals
5	(Chinese Taipei) Cheng Wen-hsing (Chinese Taipei) Chien Yu-chin	21	21
(Hong Kong) Poon Lok Yan (Hong Kong) Tse Ying Suet	17	16
3	(Japan) Mizuki Fujii (Japan) Reika Kakiiwa	21	22	15
(China) Bao Yixin (China) Zhong Qianxin	17	24	21

Final
5	(Chinese Taipei) Cheng Wen-hsing (Chinese Taipei) Chien Yu-chin	21	23	12
(China) Bao Yixin (China) Zhong Qianxin	13	25	21

== Mixed doubles ==
=== Seeds ===
1. (China) Zhang Nan / Zhao Yunlei
2. (Indonesia) Tantowi Ahmad / Lilyana Natsir (second round)
3. (Thailand) Sudket Prapakamol / Saralee Thoungthongkam (quarterfinal)
4. (Denmark) Joachim Fischer Nielsen / Christinna Pedersen
5. (Chinese Taipei) Chen Hung-ling / Cheng Wen-hsing
6. (Thailand) Songphon Anugritayawon / Kunchala Voravichitchaikul (second round)
7. (Germany) Michael Fuchs / Birgit Michels
8. (Indonesia) Fran Kurniawan / Pia Zebadiah Bernadeth (first round)

=== Top half ===
First Round
1	(China) Zhang N (China) Zhao YL	21	21
(Japan) H Hashimoto (Japan) M Fujii	14	13
(South Korea) Lee Y-d (South Korea) Ha J-e	19	21	21
(Japan) K Hayakawa (Japan) M Matsutomo	21	18	14
6	(Thailand) S Anugritayawon (Thailand) K Voravichitchaikul	22	12	21
Q1	(South Korea) Shin B-c (South Korea) Kim H-n	20	21	18
(China) Xu C (China) Ma J	21	21
(Hong Kong) Wong W H (Hong Kong) Chau H W	17	13
3	(Thailand) S Prapakamol (Thailand) S Thoungthongkam	21	21
Q4	(South Korea) Ko S-h (South Korea) Eom H-w	13	17
Q3	(Japan) N Hirata (Japan) M Maeda	17	23
(England) C Adcock (Scotland) I Bankier	21	25
5	(Chinese Taipei) Chen H-l (Chinese Taipei) Cheng W-h	21	21
(Poland) R Mateusiak (Poland) N Zieba	17	15'
(Japan) S Ikeda (Japan) R Shiota	20	15
(India) Diju V. (India) J Gutta	22	21

Second Round
1	(China) Zhang N (China) Zhao YL	21	21
(South Korea) Lee Y-d (South Korea) Ha J-e	11	19
6	(Thailand) S Anugritayawon (Thailand) K Voravichitchaikul	9	18
(China) Xu C (China) Ma J	21	21
3	(Thailand) S Prapakamol (Thailand) S Thoungthongkam	21	21
(England) C Adcock (Scotland) I Bankier	18	15
5	(Chinese Taipei) Chen H-l (Chinese Taipei) Cheng W-h	21	21
(India) Diju V. (India) J Gutta	15	10

Quarterfinals
1	(China) Zhang N (China) Zhao YL	21	21
(China) Xu C (China) Ma J	12	12
3	(Thailand) S Prapakamol (Thailand) S Thoungthongkam	18	15
5	(Chinese Taipei) Chen H-l (Chinese Taipei) Cheng W-h	21	21

Semifinals
1	(China) Zhang N (China) Zhao YL	21	22	17
5	(Chinese Taipei) Chen H-l (Chinese Taipei) Cheng W-h	19	24	21

=== Bottom half ===
First Round
(Russia) A Nikolaenko (Russia) V Sorokina	21	21
(Chinese Taipei) Fang C-m (Chinese Taipei) Wang P-r	17	14
(Japan) S Sato (Japan) S Matsuo	21	21
8	(Indonesia) F Kurniawan (Indonesia) P Z Bernadeth	16	9
(Thailand) M Jongjit (Thailand) S Amitrapai	18	21	13
(Indonesia) N Widianto (Indonesia) V Marissa	21	16	21
(China) He HB (China) Bao YX	12	17
4	(Denmark) J Fischer Nielsen (Denmark) C Pedersen	21	21
(Indonesia) M Rijal (Indonesia) D Susanto	19	18
(Chinese Taipei) Lee S-m (Chinese Taipei) Chien Y-c	21	21
(Denmark) T Laybourn (Denmark) K Rytter Juhl	20	20
7	(Germany) M Fuchs (Germany) B Michels	22	22
(Scotland) R Blair (England) G White	24	21	17
Q2	(China) Hong W (China) Pan P	22	23	21
(England) N Robertson (England) J Wallwork	10	18
2	(Indonesia) T Ahmad (Indonesia) L Natsir	21	21

Second Round
(Russia) A Nikolaenko (Russia) V Sorokina	13	19
(Japan) S Sato (Japan) S Matsuo	21	21
(Indonesia) N Widianto (Indonesia) V Marissa	21	17	20
4	(Denmark) J Fischer Nielsen (Denmark) C Pedersen	17	21	22
(Chinese Taipei) Lee S-m (Chinese Taipei) Chien Y-c	11	15
7	(Germany) M Fuchs (Germany) B Michels	21	21
Q2	(China) Hong W (China) Pan P	18	21	21
2	(Indonesia) T Ahmad (Indonesia) L Natsir	21	19	15

Quarterfinals
(Japan) S Sato (Japan) S Matsuo	13	10
4	(Denmark) J Fischer Nielsen (Denmark) C Pedersen	21	21
7	(Germany) M Fuchs (Germany) B Michels	21	22
Q2	(China) Hong W (China) Pan P	12	20

Semifinals
4	(Denmark) J Fischer Nielsen (Denmark) C Pedersen	18	21	21
7	(Germany) M Fuchs (Germany) B Michels	21	7	19

=== Finals ===
Semifinals
1	(China) Zhang Nan (China) Zhao Yunlei	21	22	17
5	(Chinese Taipei) Chen Hung-ling (Chinese Taipei) Cheng Wen-hsing	19	24	21
4	(Denmark) Joachim Fischer Nielsen (Denmark) Christinna Pedersen	18	21	21
7	(Germany) Michael Fuchs (Germany) Birgit Michels	21	7	19

Final
5	(Chinese Taipei) Chen Hung-ling (Chinese Taipei) Cheng Wen-hsing	21	16	21
4	(Denmark) Joachim Fischer Nielsen (Denmark) Christinna Pedersen	19	21	15

Preceded by 2010 Japan Super Series	Japan Open	Succeeded by 2012 Japan Super Series
Preceded by 2011 China Masters Super Series	BWF Super Series; 2011 season	Succeeded by 2011 Denmark Super Series Premier
