= Bona Septano =

Indonesian badminton player (born 1987)

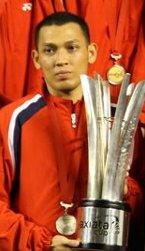

Personal information
- Born: 22 September 1987 (age 39) Medan, North Sumatera, Indonesia

Sport
- Country: Indonesia
- Sport: Badminton
- Handedness: Right
- Coached by: Aryono Miranat; Herry Iman Pierngadi

Men's doubles
- Highest ranking: 5 (with Mohammad Ahsan 9 August 2012)
Medal record
Men's badminton
Representing Indonesia
World Championships
Bronze medal – third place	2011 London	Men's doubles
Sudirman Cup
Bronze medal – third place	2009 Guangzhou	Mixed team
Bronze medal – third place	2011 Qingdao	Mixed team
Thomas Cup
Silver medal – second place	2010 Kuala Lumpur	Men's team
SEA Games
Gold medal – first place	2009 Vientiane	Men's team
Gold medal – first place	2011 Jakarta–Palembang	Men's doubles
Gold medal – first place	2011 Jakarta–Palembang	Men's team
Bronze medal – third place	2009 Vientiane	Men's doubles
Summer Universiade
Bronze medal – third place	2007 Bangkok	Mixed team

Bona Septano (born 22 September 1987) is an Indonesian former badminton player. He currently works as pilot in Indonesian airlines.

Bona Septano concentrates on men's doubles with Mohammad Ahsan. They have competed successfully on the international circuit including a finals appearances at the 2011 Japan Super Series. Unlike many other top doubles players he does not play in mixed doubles. After Olympic Games in London the pair was separated. And later was pairing with Fran Kurniawan. He is the younger brother of Markis Kido and the older brother of Pia Zebadiah Bernadet.

== Achievements ==
=== BWF World Championships ===
Men's doubles
Year	Venue	Partner	Opponent	Score	Result	Ref.
2011	Wembley Arena, London, England	(Indonesia) Mohammad Ahsan	(South Korea) Ko Sung-hyun (South Korea) Yoo Yeon-seong	19–21, 17–21	Bronze	

=== SEA Games ===
Men's doubles
Year	Venue	Partner	Opponent	Score	Result	Ref.
2009	Gym Hall 1, National Sports Complex, Vientiane, Laos	(Indonesia) Mohammad Ahsan	(Malaysia) Koo Kien Keat (Malaysia) Tan Boon Heong	16–21, 10–21	Bronze	
2011	Istora Senayan, Jakarta, Indonesia	(Indonesia) Mohammad Ahsan	(Indonesia) Markis Kido (Indonesia) Hendra Setiawan	25–23, 21–10	Gold	

=== World University Championships ===
Men's doubles
Year	Venue	Partner	Opponent	Score	Result	Ref.
2008	University of Minho, Campus de Gualtar; Braga, Portugal	(Indonesia) Mohammad Ahsan	(South Korea) Han Ki-hoon (South Korea) Han Tae-il	21–12, 21–12	Gold	

Mixed doubles
Year	Venue	Partner	Opponent	Score	Result	Ref.
2008	University of Minho, Campus de Gualtar; Braga, Portugal	(Indonesia) Richi Puspita Dili	(Thailand) Patiphat Chalardchaleam (Thailand) Kunchala Voravichitchaikul	21–16, 19–21, 18–21	Bronze	

=== BWF Superseries (2 runners-up) ===
The BWF Superseries, which was launched on 14 December 2006 and implemented in 2007, was a series of elite badminton tournaments, sanctioned by the Badminton World Federation (BWF). BWF Superseries levels were Superseries and Superseries Premier. A season of Superseries consisted of twelve tournaments around the world that had been introduced since 2011. Successful players were invited to the Superseries Finals, which were held at the end of each year.

Men's doubles
Year	Tournament	Partner	Opponent	Score	Result	Ref.
2008	Japan Open	(Indonesia) Mohammad Ahsan	(Denmark) Lars Paaske (Denmark) Jonas Rasmussen	21–17, 15–21, 21–13	(silver) Runner-up	
2011	Japan Open	(Indonesia) Mohammad Ahsan	(China) Cai Yun (China) Fu Haifeng	13–21, 21–23	(silver) Runner-up	

BWF Super Series Finals tournament
BWF Super Series Premier tournament
BWF Super Series tournament

=== BWF Grand Prix (6 titles) ===
The BWF Grand Prix had two levels, the Grand Prix and Grand Prix Gold. It was a series of badminton tournaments sanctioned by the Badminton World Federation (BWF) and played between 2007 and 2017.

Men's doubles
Year	Tournament	Partner	Opponent	Score	Result	Ref.
2009	Philippines Open	(Indonesia) Mohammad Ahsan	(Indonesia) Hendra Aprida Gunawan (Indonesia) Alvent Yulianto	10–21, 21–14, 21–17	(gold) Winner	
2010	Vietnam Open	(Indonesia) Mohammad Ahsan	(Malaysia) Ong Soon Hock (Malaysia) Fairuzizuan Tazari	21–18, 13–21, 21–17	(gold) Winner	
2010	Indonesia Grand Prix Gold	(Indonesia) Mohammad Ahsan	(Indonesia) Yonathan Suryatama Dasuki (Indonesia) Rian Sukmawan	21–16, 18–17 retired	(gold) Winner	
2010	India Grand Prix	(Indonesia) Mohammad Ahsan	(Malaysia) Gan Teik Chai (Malaysia) Tan Bin Shen	19–21, 21–15, 21–14	(gold) Winner	
2011	Indonesia Grand Prix Gold	(Indonesia) Mohammad Ahsan	(Japan) Hiroyuki Endo (Japan) Kenichi Hayakawa	21–13, 21–14	(gold) Winner	
2013	Vietnam Open	(Indonesia) Fran Kurniawan	(Chinese Taipei) Lin Chia-yu (Chinese Taipei) Wu Hsiao-lin	18–21, 21–18, 21–18	(gold) Winner	

BWF Grand Prix Gold tournament
BWF Grand Prix tournament

=== BWF International Challenge/Series (1 title, 2 runners-up) ===
Men's doubles
Year	Tournament	Partner	Opponent	Score	Result	Ref.
2007	Smiling Fish International	(Indonesia) Mohammad Ahsan	(Hong Kong) Hui Wai Ho (Hong Kong) Alroy Tanama Putra	18–21, 18–21	(silver) Runner-up	
2007	Vietnam International	(Indonesia) Mohammad Ahsan	(South Korea) Cho Gun-woo (South Korea) Yoo Yeon-seong	21–15, 21–19	(gold) Winner	
2007	Cheers Asian Satellite	(Indonesia) Mohammad Ahsan	(Malaysia) Chang Hun Pin (Malaysia) Khoo Chung Chiat	21–19, 10–21, 21–23	(silver) Runner-up	

BWF International Challenge tournament
BWF International Series tournament

== Performance timeline ==
=== National team ===
- Senior level

Team events	2007	2008	2009	2010	2011
SEA Games	A	—N/a	Gold	—N/a	Gold
Universiade	Bronze	—N/a			A
Thomas Cup	—N/a	A	—N/a	Silver	—N/a
Sudirman Cup	A	—N/a	Bronze	—N/a	Bronze

=== Individual competitions ===
- Senior level

Event	2009	2010	2011	2012
SEA Games	Bronze	—N/a	Gold	—N/a
Asian Championships	A	R1	A	
World Championships	R2	A	Bronze	—N/a
Olympic Games	—N/a			QF

Tournament	2007	2008	2009	2010	2011	Best
BWF Superseries
Japan Open	A	F	R2	SF	F	F (2008, 2011)
BWF Super Series Finals	—N/a	DNQ			GS	GS (2011)

Tournament	2007	2008	2009	2010	2011	2012	2013	Best
BWF Grand Prix and Grand Prix Gold
(India) Syed Modi International	—N/a		A	W	A		—N/a	W (2010)
Philippines Open	A	—N/a	W	—N/a				W (2009)
Vietnam Open	QF	A		W	A		W	W (2010, 2013)
Indonesia Masters	—N/a			W	W	w/d	R2	W (2010, 2011)

== Record against selected opponents ==
Men's doubles results with Mohammad Ahsan against Super Series finalists, Worlds Semi-finalists, and Olympic quarterfinalists.

- (China) Cai Yun & Fu Haifeng 0–5
- (China) Cai Yun & Xu Chen 0–1
- (China) Chai Biao & Guo Zhendong 1–4
- (China) Guo Zhendong & Xie Zhongbo 0–1
- (China) Guo Zhendong & Xu Chen 0–3
- (China) Liu Xiaolong & Qiu Zihan 5–1
- (Chinese Taipei) Fang Chieh-min & Lee Sheng-mu 3–2
- (Denmark) Mathias Boe & Carsten Mogensen 1–5
- (Denmark) Lars Påske & Jonas Rasmussen 1–2
- (Denmark) Mads Conrad-Petersen & Jonas Rasmussen 1–0
- (England) Anthony Clark & Nathan Robertson 0–3
- (Indonesia) Markis Kido & Hendra Setiawan 1–1
- (Indonesia) Angga Pratama & Rian Agung Saputro 2–1
- (Indonesia) Hendra Aprida Gunawan & Alvent Yulianto 2–1
- (Japan) Shintaro Ikeda & Shuichi Sakamoto 1–1
- (Japan) Hirokatsu Hashimoto & Noriyasu Hirata 1–0
- (Japan) Hiroyuki Endo & Kenichi Hayakawa 4–0
- (South Korea) Jung Jae-sung & Lee Yong-dae 0–3
- (South Korea) Ko Sung-hyun & Yoo Yeon-seong 1–5
- (Malaysia) Mohd Zakry Abdul Latif & Mohd Fairuzizuan Mohd Tazari 2–1
- (Malaysia) Choong Tan Fook & Lee Wan Wah 1–1
- (Malaysia) Koo Kien Keat & Tan Boon Heong 3–2
- (Poland) Adam Cwalina & Michał Łogosz 1–0
- (Thailand) Bodin Isara & Maneepong Jongjit 1–1
- (United States) Howard Bach & Tony Gunawan 1–0
