= Patiphat Chalardchaleam =

Thai badminton player (born 1987)

Personal information
- Born: 9 July 1987 (age 39)

Sport
- Country: Thailand
- Sport: Badminton

Men's & mixed doubles
- Highest ranking: 22 (MD 25 April 2013); 25 (XD 21 April 2013)
- BWF profile
Medal record
Men's badminton
Representing Thailand
Sudirman Cup
Bronze medal – third place	2013 Kuala Lumpur	Mixed team
Southeast Asian Games
Bronze medal – third place	2009 Vientiane	Men's team
Bronze medal – third place	2011 Jakarta–Palembang	Men's doubles
Bronze medal – third place	2011 Jakarta–Palembang	Men's team

Patiphat Chalardchaleam (Thai: ปฏิพัทธ์ ฉลาดแฉลม; born 9 July 1987) is a Thai badminton player.

== Achievements ==
=== Southeast Asian Games ===
Men's doubles
Year	Venue	Partner	Opponent	Score	Result
2011	Istora Senayan; Jakarta, Indonesia	(Thailand) Nipitphon Phuangphuapet	(Indonesia) Mohammad Ahsan (Indonesia) Bona Septano	12–21, 16–21	Bronze

=== BWF International Challenge/Series (7 titles, 2 runners-up) ===
Men's doubles
Year	Tournament	Partner	Opponent	Score	Result
2010	Smiling Fish International	(Thailand) Thitipong Lapho	(Malaysia) Iskandar Zulkarnain Zainuddin (Malaysia) Muhammad Syawal Mohd Ismail	21–17, 19–21, 14–21	(silver) Runner-up
2010	Lao International	(Thailand) Nipitphon Phuangphuapet	(Vietnam) Dương Bảo Đức (Vietnam) Phạm Cao Hiếu	21–15, 21–9	(gold) Winner
2011	Vietnam International	(Thailand) Nipitphon Phuangphuapet	(Indonesia) Fernando Kurniawan (Indonesia) Wifqi Windarto	19–21, 21–14, 13–21	(silver) Runner-up
2013	Smiling Fish International	(Thailand) Wannawat Ampunsuwan	(Thailand) Vasin Nilyoke (Thailand) Suwat Phaisansomsuk	22–20, 16–21, 21–15	(gold) Winner

Mixed doubles
Year	Tournament	Partner	Opponent	Score	Result
2009	Smiling Fish International	(Thailand) Savitree Amitrapai	(Thailand) Thitipong Lapho (Thailand) Vacharaporn Munkit	21–10, 21–19	(gold) Winner
2010	Smiling Fish International	(Thailand) Savitree Amitrapai	(Thailand) Maneepong Jongjit (Thailand) Rodjana Chuthabunditkul	21–19, 22–20	(gold) Winner
2010	Tata Open India International	(Thailand) Savitree Amitrapai	(India) Arun Vishnu (India) Aparna Balan	21–10, 21–15	(gold) Winner
2011	Vietnam International	(Thailand) Savitree Amitrapai	(South Korea) Kang Ji-wook (South Korea) Choi Hye-in	21–19, 20–22, 23–21	(gold) Winner
2013	Smiling Fish International	(Thailand) Jongkolphan Kititharakul	(Thailand) Wannawat Ampunsuwan (Thailand) Rodjana Chuthabunditkul	21–12, 21–11	(gold) Winner

BWF International Challenge tournament
BWF International Series tournament
