= Badminton at the 2011 SEA Games – Men's doubles =

These are the results of the men's doubles competition in badminton at the 2011 SEA Games in Jakarta.

== Medal winners ==
Gold	Silver	Bronze
Mohammad Ahsan (INA); Bona Septano (INA)	Markis Kido (INA); Hendra Setiawan (INA)	Patiphat Chalardchaleam (THA); Nipitphon Phuangphuapet (THA) Goh Wei Shem (MAS); Lim Khim Wah (MAS)

== Draw ==
=== Top half ===
First round
1	(Indonesia) Mohammad Ahsan (Indonesia) Bona Septano
Bye
(Myanmar) Thet Khine (Myanmar) Myo Zaw Oo
Bye
(Singapore) Johnathan Tang (Singapore) Jeffrey Wong
Bye
(Malaysia) Mak Hee Chun (Malaysia) Ong Soon Hock
Bye
4	(Thailand) Patiphat Chalardchaleam (Thailand) Nipitphon Phuangphuapet
Bye
(Cambodia) Prum Saravuth (Cambodia) Teav Yongvannak
Bye
(Philippines) Ronel Estanislao (Philippines) Paul Jefferson Vivas
Bye
(Laos) Tommy Sivilay (Laos) Xaysomphone Vongpachith	15	13
(Vietnam) Bùi Bằng Đức (Vietnam) Đào Mạnh Thắng	21	21

Second round
1	(Indonesia) Mohammad Ahsan (Indonesia) Bona Septano	21	21
(Myanmar) Thet Khine (Myanmar) Myo Zaw Oo	7	9
(Malaysia) Mak Hee Chun (Malaysia) Ong Soon Hock	21	21
(Singapore) Johnathan Tang (Singapore) Jeffrey Wong	10	14
4	(Thailand) Patiphat Chalardchaleam (Thailand) Nipitphon Phuangphuapet	21	21
(Cambodia) Prum Saravuth (Cambodia) Teav Yongvannak	12	18
(Philippines) Ronel Estanislao (Philippines) Paul Jefferson Vivas	14	21	21
(Vietnam) Bùi Bằng Đức (Vietnam) Đào Mạnh Thắng	21	15	19

Quarterfinals
1	(Indonesia) Mohammad Ahsan (Indonesia) Bona Septano	21	21
(Malaysia) Mak Hee Chun (Malaysia) Ong Soon Hock	14	13
4	(Thailand) Patiphat Chalardchaleam (Thailand) Nipitphon Phuangphuapet	21	21
(Philippines) Ronel Estanislao (Philippines) Paul Jefferson Vivas	12	12

Semifinals
1	(Indonesia) Mohammad Ahsan (Indonesia) Bona Septano	21	21
4	(Thailand) Patiphat Chalardchaleam (Thailand) Nipitphon Phuangphuapet	12	16

=== Bottom half ===
First round
(Timor-Leste) Jose de Fatima (Timor-Leste) Abrao Pereira	7	9
(Laos) Phongthanom Ouankhamchanh (Laos) Phanthasone Sengvidason	21	21
Bye
(Myanmar) Than Lwin Aung (Myanmar) Lwin Htet Myint
Bye
(Singapore) Liu Yi (Singapore) Terry Yeo
Bye
3	(Malaysia) Goh Wei Shem (Malaysia) Lim Khim Wah
Bye
(Thailand) Bodin Isara (Thailand) Maneepong Jongjit
Bye
(Cambodia) Chin Dethputhicheat (Cambodia) Vann Chanpisey
Bye
(Vietnam) Dương Bảo Đức (Vietnam) Nguyễn Hoàng Nam
Bye
2	(Indonesia) Markis Kido (Indonesia) Hendra Setiawan

Second round
(Laos) Phongthanom Ouankhamchanh (Laos) Phanthasone Sengvidason	20	21	15
(Myanmar) Than Lwin Aung (Myanmar) Lwin Htet Myint	22	10	21
(Singapore) Liu Yi (Singapore) Terry Yeo	14	8
3	(Malaysia) Goh Wei Shem (Malaysia) Lim Khim Wah	21	21
(Thailand) Bodin Isara (Thailand) Maneepong Jongjit	21	21
(Cambodia) Chin Dethputhicheat (Cambodia) Vann Chanpisey	13	6
(Vietnam) Dương Bảo Đức (Vietnam) Nguyễn Hoàng Nam	15	13
2	(Indonesia) Markis Kido (Indonesia) Hendra Setiawan	21	21

Quarterfinals
(Myanmar) Than Lwin Aung (Myanmar) Lwin Htet Myint	5	13
3	(Malaysia) Goh Wei Shem (Malaysia) Lim Khim Wah	21	21
(Thailand) Bodin Isara (Thailand) Maneepong Jongjit	17	16
2	(Indonesia) Markis Kido (Indonesia) Hendra Setiawan	21	21

Semifinals
3	(Malaysia) Goh Wei Shem (Malaysia) Lim Khim Wah	13	21	19
2	(Indonesia) Markis Kido (Indonesia) Hendra Setiawan	21	17	21

=== Finals ===
Semifinals
1	(Indonesia) Mohammad Ahsan (Indonesia) Bona Septano	21	21
4	(Thailand) Patiphat Chalardchaleam (Thailand) Nipitphon Phuangphuapet	12	16
3	(Malaysia) Goh Wei Shem (Malaysia) Lim Khim Wah	13	21	19
2	(Indonesia) Markis Kido (Indonesia) Hendra Setiawan	21	17	21

Final
1	(Indonesia) Mohammad Ahsan (Indonesia) Bona Septano	25	21
2	(Indonesia) Markis Kido (Indonesia) Hendra Setiawan	23	10
