= 2011 BWF World Championships – Men's doubles =

Men's doubles at the 2011 BWF World Championships
- Venue: Wembley Arena
- Location: London, England
- Dates: August 8, 2011 – August 14, 2011

Medalists
gold medal	Cai Yun; Fu Haifeng	China
silver medal	Ko Sung-hyun; Yoo Yeon-seong	South Korea
bronze medal	Jung Jae-sung; Lee Yong-dae	South Korea
bronze medal	Mohammad Ahsan; Bona Septano	Indonesia

The men's doubles tournament of the 2011 BWF World Championships (World Badminton Championships) was held from August 8 to 14. Cai Yun and Fu Haifeng were the defending champions.

In the final, Cai Yun and Fu Haifeng defeated Ko Sung-hyun and Yoo Yeon-seong 24–22, 21–16.

== Seeds ==
1. (China) Cai Yun / Fu Haifeng (champions)
2. (Denmark) Mathias Boe / Carsten Mogensen (quarterfinals)
3. (South Korea) Jung Jae-sung / Lee Yong-dae (semifinals)
4. (Malaysia) Koo Kien Keat / Tan Boon Heong (quarterfinals)
5. (South Korea) Ko Sung-hyun / Yoo Yeon-seong (final)
6. (Indonesia) Markis Kido / Hendra Setiawan (second round, retired)
7. (Indonesia) Mohammad Ahsan / Bona Septano (semifinals)
8. (Indonesia) Alvent Yulianto / Hendra Aprida Gunawan (third round)
9. (Japan) Hirokatsu Hashimoto / Noriyasu Hirata (third round)
10. (Chinese Taipei) Fang Chieh-min / Lee Sheng-mu (third round)
11. (China) Chai Biao / Guo Zhendong (third round)
12. (Japan) Naoki Kawamae / Shoji Sato (third round)
13. (Germany) Ingo Kindervater / Johannes Schöttler (second round)
14. (Japan) Hiroyuki Endo / Kenichi Hayakawa (third round)
15. (South Korea) Cho Gun-woo / Kwon Yi-goo (third round)
16. (Denmark) Mads Conrad-Petersen / Jonas Rasmussen (quarterfinals)

== Draw ==
=== Finals ===
Quarterfinals
1	(China) Cai Yun (China) Fu Haifeng	21	21
16	(Denmark) Mads Conrad-Petersen (Denmark) Jonas Rasmussen	10	13
3	(South Korea) Jung Jae-sung (South Korea) Lee Yong-dae	21	26
(China) Hong Wei (China) Shen Ye	12	24
5	(South Korea) Ko Sung-hyun (South Korea) Yoo Yeon-seong	21	21
4	(Malaysia) Koo Kien Keat (Malaysia) Tan Boon Heong	17	13
7	(Indonesia) Mohammad Ahsan (Indonesia) Bona Septano	21	18	24
2	(Denmark) Mathias Boe (Denmark) Carsten Mogensen	18	21	22

Semifinals
1	(China) Cai Yun (China) Fu Haifeng	21	21
3	(South Korea) Jung Jae-sung (South Korea) Lee Yong-dae	18	14
5	(South Korea) Ko Sung-hyun (South Korea) Yoo Yeon-seong	21	21
7	(Indonesia) Mohammad Ahsan (Indonesia) Bona Septano	19	17

Final
1	(China) Cai Yun (China) Fu Haifeng	24	21
5	(South Korea) Ko Sung-hyun (South Korea) Yoo Yeon-seong	22	16

=== Section 1 ===
First Round
(England) M Ellis (England) P Mills	11	13
' (Russia) V Ivanov (Russia) I Sozonov	21	21
(Poland) A Cwalina (Poland) M Łogosz	21	21
(Malaysia) Chan PS (Malaysia) Lim KW	13	19
(Germany) M Fuchs (Germany) O Roth	21	18	17
(India) R Kumar (India) S Thomas	9	21	21
(Belgium) M Dierickx (Belgium) F Golinski	17	15
(South Africa) DL James (South Africa) W Viljoen	21	21

Second Round
1	(China) Cai Y (China) Fu HF	21	14	21
(Russia) V Ivanov (Russia) I Sozonov	12	21	12
12	(Japan) N Kawamae (Japan) S Sato	21	23
(Poland) A Cwalina (Poland) M Łogosz	16	21
8	(Indonesia) A Yulianto (Indonesia) HA Gunawan	19	21	21
(India) R Kumar (India) S Thomas	21	11	12
16	(Denmark) M Conrad-Petersen (Denmark) J Rasmussen	21	21
(South Africa) DL James (South Africa) W Viljoen	10	7

Third Round
1	(China) Cai Y (China) Fu HF	21	15	21
12	(Japan) N Kawamae (Japan) S Sato	17	21	14
8	(Indonesia) A Yulianto (Indonesia) HA Gunawan	20	21	18
16	(Denmark) M Conrad-Petersen (Denmark) J Rasmussen	22	13	21

Quarterfinals
1	(China) Cai Y (China) Fu HF	21	21
16	(Denmark) M Conrad-Petersen (Denmark) J Rasmussen	10	13

=== Section 2 ===
First Round
(England) A Clark (England) C Langridge	21	21
(Japan) Y Hirobe (Japan) K Kazuno	15	17
(Australia) R Smith (Australia) G Warfe	21	21
(Scotland) M Campbell (Scotland) A Gilmour	13	17
(Netherlands) J de Ruiter (Netherlands) D Khodabux	19	16
(China) Hong W (China) Shen Y	21	21
(United States) H Bach (United States) T Gunawan	17	14
(Malaysia) MZ Abdul Latif (Malaysia) Hoon TH	21	21

Second Round
3	(South Korea) Jung J-s (South Korea) Lee Y-d	21	21
(England) A Clark (England) C Langridge	10	16
14	(Japan) H Endo (Japan) K Hayakawa	21	21
(Australia) R Smith (Australia) G Warfe	9	11
6	(Indonesia) M Kido (Indonesia) H Setiawan	wo
(China) Hong W (China) Shen Y
10	(Chinese Taipei) Fang C-m (Chinese Taipei) Lee S-m	26	21
(Malaysia) MZ Abdul Latif (Malaysia) Hoon TH	24	19

Third Round
3	(South Korea) Jung J-s (South Korea) Lee Y-d	21	21
14	(Japan) H Endo (Japan) K Hayakawa	14	5
(China) Hong W (China) Shen Y	18	21	21
10	(Chinese Taipei) Fang C-m (Chinese Taipei) Lee S-m	21	17	15

Quarterfinals
3	(South Korea) Jung J-s (South Korea) Lee Y-d	21	26
(China) Hong W (China) Shen Y	12	24

=== Section 3 ===
First Round
(Singapore) T Yeo (Singapore) Liu Y	14	13
(Russia) V Durkin (Russia) A Nikolaenko	21	21
(Brazil) H Arthuso (Brazil) D Paiola	10	11
(England) C Adcock (England) A Ellis	21	21
(Chinese Taipei) Chen H-l (Chinese Taipei) Lin Y-l	21	21
(India) P Chopra (India) T Kona	17	13
(Poland) L Moren (Poland) W Szkudlarczyk	10	14
(China) Liu XL (China) Qiu ZH	21	21

Second Round
(Russia) V Durkin (Russia) A Nikolaenko	10	16
15	(South Korea) Cho G-w (South Korea) Kwon Y-g	21	21
(England) C Adcock (England) A Ellis	21	13	13
5	(South Korea) Ko S-h (South Korea) Yoo Y-s	18	21	21
(Chinese Taipei) Chen H-l (Chinese Taipei) Lin Y-l	21	18	21
13	(Germany) I Kindervater (Germany) J Schöttler	19	21	16
(China) Liu XL (China) Qiu ZH	6	22	15
4	(Malaysia) Koo KK (Malaysia) Tan BH	21	20	21

Third Round
15	(South Korea) Cho G-w (South Korea) Kwon Y-g	15	17
5	(South Korea) Ko S-h (South Korea) Yoo Y-s	21	21
(Chinese Taipei) Chen H-l (Chinese Taipei) Lin Y-l	13	14
4	(Malaysia) Koo KK (Malaysia) Tan BH	21	21

Quarterfinals
5	(South Korea) Ko S-h (South Korea) Yoo Y-s	21	21
4	(Malaysia) Koo KK (Malaysia) Tan BH	17	13

=== Section 4 ===
First Round
(Republic of Ireland) S Magee (Republic of Ireland) T Stephenson	21	21
(Ukraine) V Konov (Ukraine) D Zavadsky	19	15
(France) B Careme (France) S Grosjean	22	21
(Croatia) Z Durkinjak (Croatia) Z Hoelbling	20	14
(United States) S Gunatileka (United States) V Nguy	8	7
(Netherlands) R Bosch (Netherlands) K Ridder	21	21
(Thailand) S Anugritayawon (Thailand) S Prapakamol	27	19
(Canada) A Liu (Canada) D Ng	29	21

Second Round
(Republic of Ireland) S Magee (Republic of Ireland) T Stephenson	11	10
11	(China) Chai B (China) Guo ZD	21	21
(France) B Careme (France) S Grosjean	15	17
7	(Indonesia) M Ahsan (Indonesia) B Septano	21	21
(Netherlands) R Bosch (Netherlands) K Ridder	14	21	12
9	(Japan) H Hashimoto (Japan) N Hirata	21	18	21
(Canada) A Liu (Canada) D Ng	5	10
2	(Denmark) M Boe (Denmark) C Mogensen	21	21

Third Round
11	(China) Chai B (China) Guo ZD	20	16
7	(Indonesia) M Ahsan (Indonesia) B Septano	22	21
9	(Japan) H Hashimoto (Japan) N Hirata	21	10
2	(Denmark) M Boe (Denmark) C Mogensen	23	21

Quarterfinals
7	(Indonesia) M Ahsan (Indonesia) B Septano	21	18	24
2	(Denmark) M Boe (Denmark) C Mogensen	18	21	22
