= Mohammad Ahsan =

Indonesian badminton player (born 1987)

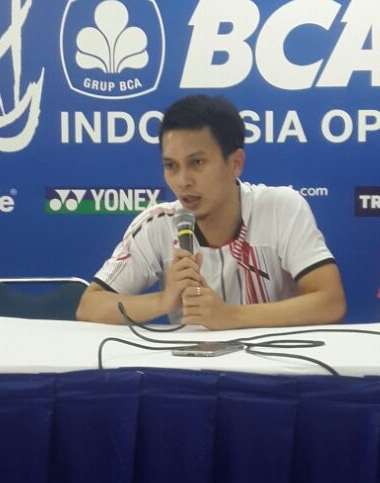

Personal information
- Born: 7 September 1987 (age 39) Palembang, South Sumatra, Indonesia
- Years active: 2005-2025
- Height: 1.73 m (5 ft 8 in)
- Weight: 68 kg (150 lb)
- Spouse: Christine Novitania (m. 2013)

Sport
- Country: Indonesia
- Sport: Badminton
- Handedness: Right
- Coached by: Christian Hadinata; Herry Iman Pierngadi; Aryono Miranat

Men's doubles
- Career record: 489 wins, 214 losses
- Highest ranking: 1 (with Hendra Setiawan 21 November 2013); 5 (with Bona Septano 9 August 2012); 13 (with Rian Agung Saputro 23 November 2017)
- BWF profile
Medal record
Men's badminton
Representing Indonesia
World Championships
Gold medal – first place	2013 Guangzhou	Men's doubles
Gold medal – first place	2015 Jakarta	Men's doubles
Gold medal – first place	2019 Basel	Men's doubles
Silver medal – second place	2017 Glasgow	Men's doubles
Silver medal – second place	2022 Tokyo	Men's doubles
Bronze medal – third place	2011 London	Men's doubles
Sudirman Cup
Bronze medal – third place	2009 Guangzhou	Mixed team
Bronze medal – third place	2011 Qingdao	Mixed team
Bronze medal – third place	2015 Dongguan	Mixed team
Bronze medal – third place	2019 Nanning	Mixed team
Thomas Cup
Gold medal – first place	2020 Aarhus	Men's team
Silver medal – second place	2010 Kuala Lumpur	Men's team
Silver medal – second place	2016 Kunshan	Men's team
Silver medal – second place	2022 Bangkok	Men's team
Bronze medal – third place	2014 New Delhi	Men's team
Bronze medal – third place	2018 Bangkok	Men's team
Asian Games
Gold medal – first place	2014 Incheon	Men's doubles
Silver medal – second place	2018 Jakarta–Palembang	Men's team
Bronze medal – third place	2010 Guangzhou	Men's doubles
Bronze medal – third place	2010 Guangzhou	Men's team
Asian Championships
Silver medal – second place	2015 Wuhan	Men's doubles
Asia Team Championships
Gold medal – first place	2016 Hyderabad	Men's team
Gold medal – first place	2018 Alor Setar	Men's team
Gold medal – first place	2020 Manila	Men's team
SEA Games
Gold medal – first place	2009 Vientiane	Men's team
Gold medal – first place	2011 Jakarta–Palembang	Men's doubles
Gold medal – first place	2011 Jakarta–Palembang	Men's team
Bronze medal – third place	2009 Vientiane	Men's doubles
Summer Universiade
Bronze medal – third place	2007 Bangkok	Mixed team
Asian Junior Championships
Bronze medal – third place	2005 Jakarta	Boys' doubles
Bronze medal – third place	2005 Jakarta	Boys' team

Mohammad Ahsan (born 7 September 1987) is an Indonesian retired badminton player affiliated with Djarum club who specializes in the men's doubles. He is a three-time World Champion, three-time season ending finals champion, and Asian Games gold medalist.

Joining the Djarum club since 2007, opened Ahsan's opportunity to join the Indonesian national team until he finally implemented it in the middle of 2008. Paired with Bona Septano, they managed to win the bronze medal at the 2011 BWF World Championships, and were ranked as high as sixth in the BWF World Rankings. Ahsan broke the world's men's doubles stage when he teamed-up with Hendra Setiawan. Ahsan and Setiawan partnership have collected 3 gold and 1 silver medals at the World Championships, a men's doubles gold in the Asian and SEA Games, and also three titles in the season ending finals. They reached a career high as world number 1.

There are several names, who have also paired with Ahsan such as Alvent Yulianto, where they won a bronze medal in the 2010 Asian Games; and winning a silver medal at the 2017 BWF World Championships with Rian Agung Saputro. As a member of the Indonesian national team, Ahsan also contributed to winning the men's team title at the SEA Games in 2009 and 2011; three consecutive Asia Team Championships title in 2016, 2018 and 2020; and also in the major international event, the Thomas Cup in 2020.

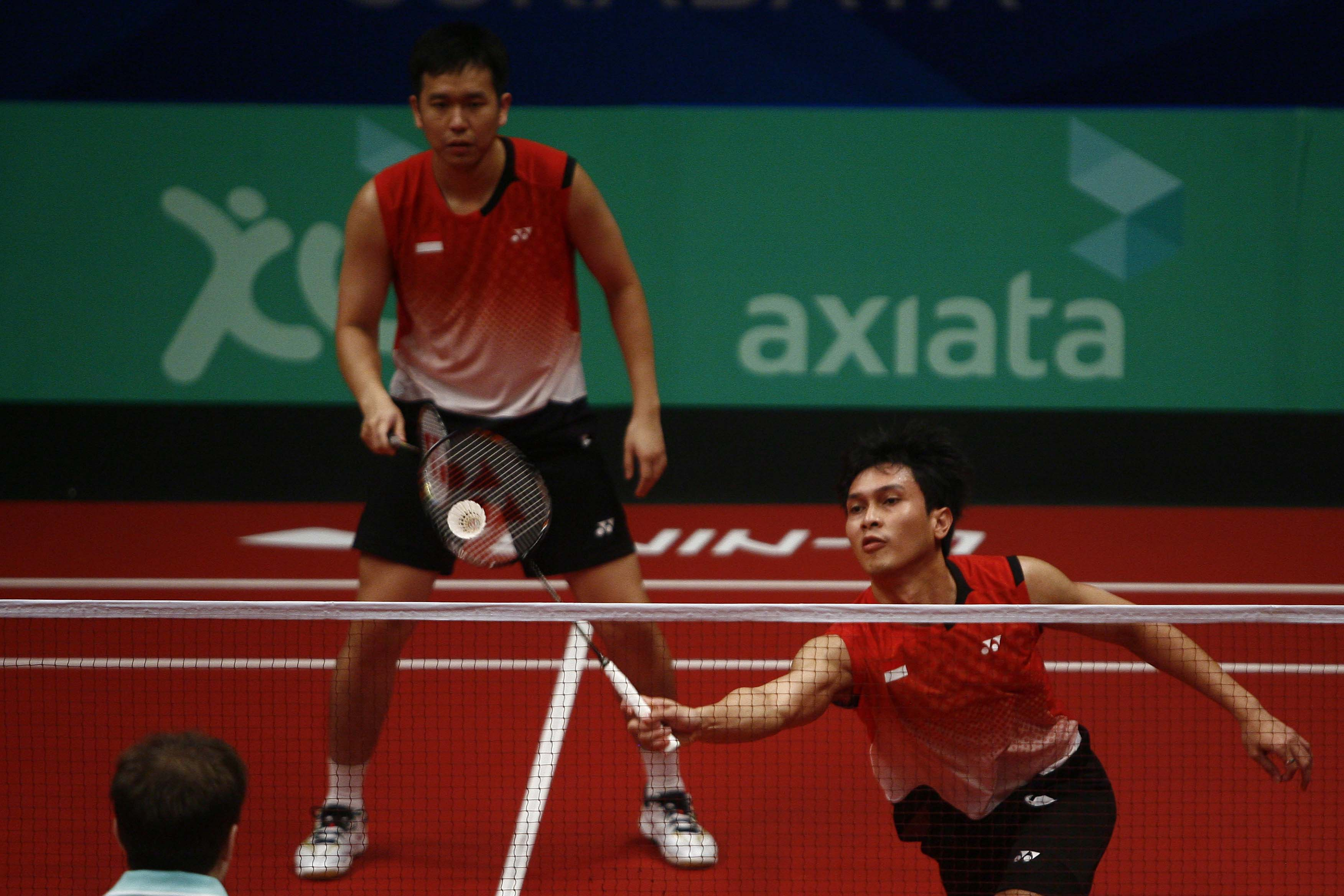
Ahsan and Setiawan at the 2013 Axiata Cup

== Early life ==
Mohammad Ahsan was born in Palembang, South Sumatera to Tumin Atmadi dan Siti Rohanah. He is the youngest of three siblings. Ahsan started playing badminton at aged 5, trained at the Pusri club. After graduating from middle school, he moved to Jakarta for better training and a chance to develop his career as a badminton player. In 2001, he was selected to join the Ragunan sports school. Due to the change in the program at the school which will only focus on female athletes, Ahsan then decides to join the Bina Bangsa club.

== Career ==
=== 2005–2007: Career beginnings ===
In the junior event, Mohammad Ahsan played at the 2005 Asian Junior Championships and won the bronze medals in the boys' team and doubles.

Ahsan became a member of Djarum club since 2007. In April, Ahsan made his debut at the Asian Championships held in Johor Bahru, Malaysia. Unfortunately, he and his partner, Bona Septano, were defeated in the early rounds. They later reached three consecutive finals in the Smiling Fish Thailand, Vietnam and Cheers Asian Singapore Internationals; and clinched their first international title as a pair in Vietnam. In August, he representing STIE Perbanas played at the Summer Universiade, and won a bronze medal in the mixed team event.

=== 2008–2009: First Grand Prix title ===
In July, Ahsan who representing North Maluku won a silver medal at the National Games in the men's doubles event with partner Fernando Kurniawan. Ahsan was selected to join Indonesia national training center in the middle of 2008. He was then reached his first Super Series finals with Bona Septano in the Japan Open where they faced Lars Paaske and Jonas Rasmussen, but lost the match in three games.

Ahsan and Bona Septano clinched their first Grand Prix title in the 2009 Philippines Open. He made his debut with the Indonesia national team at the Sudirman Cup, and won a bronze medal at that tournament. On his first appearance at the SEA Games, he contributing points for Indonesia in the final against Malaysia, secured a gold medal for the team, and a bronze medal in the men's doubles. Meanwhile, Ahsan and Septano debut at the World Championships had to be knocked out in the second round by the Chinese pair Guo Zhendong and Xu Chen. They also reaching the quarter-finals in some Super Series tournaments; the Korea, All England, and the French Opens.

=== 2010–2011: SEA Games gold and World Championships bronze ===
Ahsan made his debut with Indonesia team in the Thomas Cup in 2010. At that tournament, Indonesia reached the finals and won the silver medal after being defeated by the defending champion China. After his partner, Bona Septano, come back from injury, they had won two titles in a row in the Vietnam Grand Prix and Indonesia Grand Prix Gold in October. Ahsan then participated in the 2010 Asian Games, winning two bronze medals in the men's doubles with Alvent Yulianto and in the men's team event. Ahsan and his partner, Septano, closed the 2010 season by winning the men's doubles title in the India Grand Prix.

In the first semester of 2011 season, Ahsan and Septano unable to win a title, since their best results were the semi-finalists in the Malaysia and Indonesia Opens, as well as the quarter-finalists in the All England, Swiss Open and the Malaysia Grand Prix Gold. Ahsan also took part at the Sudirman Cup, and prevented a clean sweep from Denmark, as he and Alvent Yulianto beating the current world number 1 Mathias Boe and Carsten Mogensen in straight games, but Indonesia lost 1–3 in the semifinals tie. In August, Ahsan and Septano captured the bronze medal at the BWF World Championships. The duo then reached their first final of the year in the Japan Open, but lost to current World Champions Cai Yun and Fu Haifeng. They managed to win their first title of the year, by defend the Indonesia Grand Prix Gold title, and then won the gold medals in the men's team and doubles events in the SEA Games. Another results for Ahsan and Septano in the rest of 2011 season were the quarter-finalists in the China Masters, French, and Macau Opens. They qualified to compete in the Super Series Finals in Liuzhou, China, but their pace at that tournament were stopped in the group stage.

=== 2012–2013: Beginning of Ahsan and Setiawan partnership, World champions, and number 1 ===
In 2012, Ahsan and Setiawan partnership did not show satisfactory results, since they were unable to win any international tournaments, up to 2012 London Olympics when they were only able to finished the tournament as a quarter-finalists. In September, he played at the National Games for Central Java, and claimed two gold medals in the men's doubles and team events, and also a bronze in the mixed doubles. Ahsan then formed a new partnership with his senior, Hendra Setiawan. Ahsan and Setiawan debut were quite good as they finished as semi-finalists in the Denmark Open.

Ahsan and Setiawan campaign in 2013 looks promising. In January, they clinched their first title as a pair in the Malaysia Open, beating the Korean pair Ko Sung-hyun and Lee Yong-dae in the final. They later won five tournaments in a row, started in the Australia Open in April; the Indonesia and Singapore Opens in June, with another victory against Ko and Lee in both tournaments; the BWF World Championships in August; and later at the Japan Open in September. At the World Championships, they won the title without dropping a single game to their opponents on the way to the final. Their winning streak then stopped by youngster compatriot Ronald Alexander and Selvanus Geh in the quarter-finals of the Indonesia Grand Prix Gold. They then suffered back-to-back losses to Lee yong-dae with his new partner, Yoo Yeon-seong, in the final of the Denmark Open, first round of the China Open, and also in the semi-finals of the Hong Kong Open. The duo later won the season-ending tournament title, the BWF Superseries Finals, defeating Koreans Kim Gi-jung and Kim Sa-rang in straight sets. For their achievements in 2013, Setiawan and Ahsan took the number one position in the BWF world ranking in November 2013.

=== 2014–2016: First All England title and Asian Games gold ===
In March 2014, Ahsan and Setiawan won the All England Open after beating the Japanese pairing of Hiroyuki Endo and Kenichi Hayakawa in the final. This is the first All England title for both players. They were included in the Indonesian squad at the 2014 Thomas Cup in New Delhi. At that tournament, Ahsan and Setiawan won their first match against Lee Yong-dae and Yoo Yeon-seong, and led Indonesia won 3–2 in the quarter-finals tie against South Korea. Indonesia was then defeated by Malaysia in the semi-finals. Ahsan and Setiawan again lost to Lee and Yoo in the finals of the Japan and Indonesia Opens. They then recorded their second win over the Korean pair Lee and Yoo in the men's doubles final of the 2014 Asian Games, claiming Ahsan's first ever Asian Games gold. In November, Ahsan and Setiawan won the Hong Kong Open. They later played at the invitational tournament, "Glory to the King", and won the men's doubles title after beating host pair Bodin Isara and Pakkawat Vilailak in the final.

Ahsan and Setiawan captured three titles in 2015, the Malaysia Open, BWF World Championships, and at the Dubai World Superseries Finals. Their victory begins with defeating Lee Yong-dae and Yoo Yeon-seong in the final of the Malaysia Open in April. At the Asian Championships, they reached the finals, losing out to top seed Lee and Yoo in a close rubber games. At the Sudirman Cup, they were able to contribute points for the Indonesian team, by defeating the four-time World Champions Cai Yun and Fu Haifeng, but China took the next 3 matches, so that Indonesia cannot advance to the final. Ahsan and Setiawan also stopped in the semi-finals of the Indonesia and Chinese Taipei Opens. The duo then won their second World Championships title as a pair, after winning the 2015 BWF World Championships in their home country. They defeated Lee and Yoo in straight games in the semi-finals and the Chinese pair Liu Xiaolong and Qiu Zihan in the final. After the World Championships, they were unable to give an accomplishment, with their best results being the semi-finalists in the French and Hong Kong Opens. Ahsan and Setiawan finally won their second season-ending title at the Dubai World Superseries Finals after defeating Chai Biao and Hong Wei in the finals.

Ahsan began the 2016 season by winning the Thailand Masters with Setiawan. He played at the Asia Team Championships, and helped Indonesia progress to the final round. Indonesia won the title after beating Japan in the final. He also competed at the Thomas Cup, and the team finished runner-up to Denmark. Ahsan made his second appearance at the Olympic Games by competed in the 2016 Rio with partner Setiawan as the second seeds, but the duo were eliminated in the group stage. The duo split after the 2016 Korea Open Super Series, ending their four years partnership. Ahsan was then partnered with Berry Angriawan. His partnership with Angriawan was short-lived and he was then paired with Rian Agung Saputro.

=== 2017–2018: Ahsan-Saputro World silver medalist; Ahsan-Setiawan reunite: "The Daddies" ===
Ahsan and Saputro's first international title was in 2017 China International. They later won silver at the 2017 BWF World Championships. In the Superseries event tournaments, Ahsan and Saputro have not been able to show consistency in their matches, and their best result during the season were being a semi-finalists in the China Open. Ahsan and Setiawan paired back again in the end of 2017, to compete in the Indonesian National Championships. They emerged victorious at that competition after beating Frengky Wijaya Putra and Sabar Karyaman Gutama in the final.

Opened the 2018 season by competing in the Indonesia Masters, Ahsan, who was paired with Angga Pratama, had to suffer a defeat in the first round by Mads Conrad-Petersen and Mads Pieler Kolding. Ahsan and Pratama then managed to contribute point for Indonesia as the first men's doubles in the Asia Team Championships final, and the team thrashing China 3–1 to retain the title. After Setiawan returns to the national training center, Ahsan and Setiawan officially reunited to compete at the international level. Their nickname is "The Daddies" because both of them have started families and often show affection towards their children. Their first title came from the Malaysia International Challenge, where they upsetting host pair Aaron Chia and Soh Wooi Yik in the final. At the 2018 Thomas Cup, Ahsan with Indonesia men's team failed to win the title after losing out to China 1–3 in the semi-finals. In July, the duo won their first World Tour title in the Singapore Open by beating Ou Xuanyi and Ren Xiangyu of China. In the rest of 2018 tournaments, Setiawan and Ahsan best results were being semi-finalists in the Denmark, Fuzhou China, and the Hong Kong Opens. The duo qualified to compete at the World Tour Finals, but at that tournament, they were eliminated in the group stage. He and his partner ended the 2018 season ranked as world number 9.

=== 2019: Second All England title and third World Championships title ===
Ahsan and Setiawan were one of the most dominant pairs in the 2019 season, where they entered 11 finals and became the first men's doubles pair to win 3 major titles in a year. Their achievements started at the Indonesia Masters, when the duo finished runner-up to their junior compatriot Marcus Fernaldi Gideon and Kevin Sanjaya Sukamuljo. The first victory came from the All England Open, when they defeating Malaysia's Chia and Soh in the final. This was their second All England title as a pair. They then lost in the finals of the Singapore Open to Takeshi Kamura and Keigo Sonoda of Japan. Ahsan and Setiawan captured their second World Tour title of the year in the New Zealand Open when they beating Japanese pairing of Hiroyuki Endo and Yuta Watanabe in a close rubber games. Ahsan also participated in his sixth Sudirman Cup, and took the bronze medal after Indonesia being defeated by Japan in the semi-finals. In July, they reached two finals in the Indonesia and Japan Opens and come off second-best to Gideon and Sukamuljo in both tournaments. In late August, Ahsan captured his third World Championships title. He and his partner, Setiawan, won the BWF World Championships, defeated the up-and-coming Japanese duo Takuro Hoki and Yugo Kobayashi in the final. These results also took them to move up to second place in the BWF rankings. They were again confronted by the youngster Gideon and Sukamuljo in the final of the China and Denmark Opens. Ahsan and Setiawan have never won a match against Gideon and Sukamuljo in the last 5 meetings in 2019. They also suffered losses in the final round of the Hong Kong Open, this time by a Korean pair Choi Sol-gyu and Seo Seung-jae. At the end of the year, Ahsan and Setiawan defeated Endo and Watanabe in straight games to win the BWF World Tour Finals.

=== 2020–2022: First Thomas Cup ===
Ahsan and his partner, Hendra Setiawan opened the 2020 season as the semi-finalists in the Malaysia Masters. They then reached the finals of the Indonesia Masters, but still unable to overcome the pressing game from Gideon and Sukamuljo, and accepted defeat in straight games. At the All England Open, the duo were unable to defend the title after being stopped in the quarter-finals by Japanese pair Endo and Watanabe. Ahsan also played at the decision match at the 2020 Asia Team Championships, where Ahsan who was paired with Fajar Alfian ended the match by defeating Ong Yew Sin and Teo Ee Yi in straight games, and led Indonesia won 3–1 in the finals tie against Malaysia.

In January 2021, Ahsan and Setiawan competed at the 2020 Asian Leg tournament held in Thailand. They first reached the quarter-finals in the Yonex Thailand Open, and then finished as semi-finalists in the Toyota Thailand Open. The duo qualified to play at the BWF World Tour Finals, and reached the final after being able to avenge the defeat to the Korean pair Choi Sol-gyu and Seo Seung-jae from the Yonex Thailand Open, but lost the finals to the Chinese Taipei pair Lee Yang and Wang Chi-lin who previously beat them at the Toyota Thailand Open. In July 2021, Ahsan made his third appearance at the Summer Olympics, at Tokyo 2020. Competing with Setiawan as the 2nd seeds, he finished fourth after being defeated by Malaysia's Aaron Chia and Soh Wooi Yik in the bronze medal match. In October, at Aarhus, Denmark, Ahsan was part of Indonesia winning team in the Thomas Cup, where the team beat China in the final 3–0, claiming Indonesia's first title in 19 years. Their best results in the rest of 2021 season were reaching the quarter-finals in the French and Hylo Opens.

Ahsan and Setiawan began the 2022 season as finalists in the India Open. They then stormed into their third All England final. They lost to compatriots Muhammad Shohibul Fikri and Bagas Maulana in the final. At the Korea Open, they lost in the semi-finals to Seo Seung-jae who this time paired with Kang Min-hyuk. They then reached their second final of the year in the Malaysia Masters, but have not been able to top the podium after being defeated by their compatriot Fajar Alfian and Muhammad Rian Ardianto. Later in August, Ahsan and Setiawan entered their fourth BWF World Championships final as a pair. They lost to Malaysia's Chia and Soh in straight games, 19–21, 14–21, after initially leading 19–16 in the first game, eventually losing in 40 minutes. The duo qualified to play at the BWF World Tour Finals, and reached the final but lost to the 4th seed Chinese pair Liu Yuchen and Ou Xuanyi.

=== 2023 ===
Ahsan and his partner, Hendra Setiawan opened the 2023 season at the Malaysia Open, but defeated in the quarter-finals round to Korean pair Kang Min-hyuk and Seo Seung-jae. In the next tournament, they lost the first round of India Open from unseeded Chinese pair Liang Weikeng and Wang Chang. They competed in the home tournament, Indonesia Masters, but unfortunately lost in the second round from fellow Indonesian pair Leo Rolly Carnando and Daniel Marthin.

With the Indonesian federation skipping the German Open, Ahsan resumed competition at the All England in March. He and Setiawan lost their two consecutive All England final in an all-Indonesian final against 1st seed Fajar Alfian and Muhammad Rian Ardianto.

In late April, Ahsan competed at the Asian Championships in Dubai, United Arab Emirates, but had to lose in the quarter-finals from 6th seed and eventual champion Indian pair Satwiksairaj Rankireddy and Chirag Shetty.

In May, Ahsan competed in the second Asian Tour at the Malaysia Masters. Unfortunately, he lost in the quarter-finals from eventual finalist Malaysian youngster Man Wei Chong and Tee Kai Wun.

In June, Ahsan competed at the Singapore Open, but lost in the second round from Korean pair Choi Sol-gyu and Kim Won-ho. In the next tour, they competed at the home tournament, Indonesia Open, but lost in the second round from their compatriot Indonesian pair Pramudya Kusumawardana and Yeremia Rambitan in rubber games.

In July, Ahsan competed at the Canada Open, but lost in the quarter-finals from 5th seed Chinese Taipei pair Lee Yang and Wang Chi-lin. In the East Asian Tour, he competed at the Japan Open, but lost in the quarter-finals against 1st seed fellow Indonesian pair Fajar Alfian and Muhammad Rian Ardianto for second times this year.

In early August, Ahsan competed at the Australian Open, but had to lose in the second round from Taiwanese pair Lu Ching-yao and Yang Po-han in straight games. In late August, he competed at the World Championships, but lost in the quarter-finals round from 9th seed Korean pair Kang Min-hyuk and Seo Seung-jae in straight games.

== Awards and nominations ==
Award	Year	Category	Result	Ref.
AORI	2014	Best Male Athlete with Hendra Setiawan	Won	
AORI	2015	Best Male Athlete with Hendra Setiawan	Won	
BWF Awards	2013	BWF Best Male Player of the Year with Hendra Setiawan	Nominated	
BWF Awards	2019	BWF Best Male Player of the Year with Hendra Setiawan	Nominated	
Gatra Awards	2021	Sports Category with 2020 Thomas Cup squad	Won	
Golden Award SIWO PWI	2020	Best of the Best with Hendra Setiawan	Won	
Golden Award SIWO PWI	2019	Favorite Team with 2018 Asian Games men's badminton team	Nominated	
KONI Award	2014	Best Athlete with Hendra Setiawan	Won	

== Achievements ==
=== BWF World Championships ===
Men's doubles
Year	Venue	Partner	Opponent	Score	Result	Ref.
2011	Wembley Arena, London, England	(Indonesia) Bona Septano	(South Korea) Ko Sung-hyun (South Korea) Yoo Yeon-seong	19–21, 17–21	Bronze	
2013	Tianhe Sports Center, Guangzhou, China	(Indonesia) Hendra Setiawan	(Denmark) Mathias Boe (Denmark) Carsten Mogensen	21–13, 23–21	Gold	
2015	Istora Senayan, Jakarta, Indonesia	(Indonesia) Hendra Setiawan	(China) Liu Xiaolong (China) Qiu Zihan	21–17, 21–14	Gold	
2017	Emirates Arena, Glasgow, Scotland	(Indonesia) Rian Agung Saputro	(China) Liu Cheng (China) Zhang Nan	10–21, 17–21	Silver	
2019	St. Jakobshalle, Basel, Switzerland	(Indonesia) Hendra Setiawan	(Japan) Takuro Hoki (Japan) Yugo Kobayashi	25–23, 9–21, 21–15	Gold	
2022	Tokyo Metropolitan Gymnasium, Tokyo, Japan	(Indonesia) Hendra Setiawan	(Malaysia) Aaron Chia (Malaysia) Soh Wooi Yik	19–21, 14–21	Silver	

=== Asian Games ===
Men's doubles
Year	Venue	Partner	Opponent	Score	Result	Ref.
2010	Tianhe Gymnasium, Guangzhou, China	(Indonesia) Alvent Yulianto	(Malaysia) Koo Kien Keat (Malaysia) Tan Boon Heong	19–21, 16–21	Bronze	
2014	Gyeyang Gymnasium, Incheon, South Korea	(Indonesia) Hendra Setiawan	(South Korea) Lee Yong-dae (South Korea) Yoo Yeon-seong	21–16, 16–21, 21–17	Gold	

=== Asian Championships ===
Men's doubles
Year	Venue	Partner	Opponent	Score	Result	Ref.
2015	Wuhan Sports Center Gymnasium, Wuhan, China	(Indonesia) Hendra Setiawan	(South Korea) Lee Yong-dae (South Korea) Yoo Yeon-seong	21–18, 22–24, 19–21	Silver	

=== SEA Games ===
Men's doubles
Year	Venue	Partner	Opponent	Score	Result	Ref.
2009	Gym Hall 1, National Sports Complex, Vientiane, Laos	(Indonesia) Bona Septano	(Malaysia) Koo Kien Keat (Malaysia) Tan Boon Heong	16–21, 10–21	Bronze	
2011	Istora Senayan, Jakarta, Indonesia	(Indonesia) Bona Septano	(Indonesia) Markis Kido (Indonesia) Hendra Setiawan	25–23, 21–10	Gold	

=== World University Championships ===
Men's doubles
Year	Venue	Partner	Opponent	Score	Result	Ref.
2008	University of Minho, Campus de Gualtar, Braga, Portugal	(Indonesia) Bona Septano	(South Korea) Han Ki-hoon (South Korea) Han Tae-il	21–12, 21–12	Gold	

=== Asian Junior Championships ===
Men's doubles
Year	Venue	Partner	Opponent	Score	Result	Ref.
2005	Tennis Indoor Senayan, Jakarta, Indonesia	(Indonesia) Viki Indra Okvana	(South Korea) Cho Gun-woo (South Korea) Lee Yong-dae	8–15, 2–15	Bronze	

=== BWF World Tour (4 titles, 15 runners-up) ===
The BWF World Tour, which was announced on 19 March 2017 and implemented in 2018, is a series of elite badminton tournaments sanctioned by the Badminton World Federation (BWF). The BWF World Tour is divided into levels of World Tour Finals, Super 1000, Super 750, Super 500, Super 300, and the BWF Tour Super 100.

Men's doubles
Year	Tournament	Level	Partner	Opponent	Score	Result	Ref.
2018	Singapore Open	Super 500	(Indonesia) Hendra Setiawan	(China) Ou Xuanyi (China) Ren Xiangyu	21–13, 21–19	(gold) Winner	
2019	Indonesia Masters	Super 500	(Indonesia) Hendra Setiawan	(Indonesia) Marcus Fernaldi Gideon (Indonesia) Kevin Sanjaya Sukamuljo	17–21, 11–21	(silver) Runner-up	
2019	All England Open	Super 1000	(Indonesia) Hendra Setiawan	(Malaysia) Aaron Chia (Malaysia) Soh Wooi Yik	11–21, 21–14, 21–12	(gold) Winner	
2019	Singapore Open	Super 500	(Indonesia) Hendra Setiawan	(Japan) Takeshi Kamura (Japan) Keigo Sonoda	13–21, 21–19, 17–21	(silver) Runner-up	
2019	New Zealand Open	Super 300	(Indonesia) Hendra Setiawan	(Japan) Hiroyuki Endo (Japan) Yuta Watanabe	20–22, 21–15, 21–17	(gold) Winner	
2019	Indonesia Open	Super 1000	(Indonesia) Hendra Setiawan	(Indonesia) Marcus Fernaldi Gideon (Indonesia) Kevin Sanjaya Sukamuljo	19–21, 16–21	(silver) Runner-up	
2019	Japan Open	Super 750	(Indonesia) Hendra Setiawan	(Indonesia) Marcus Fernaldi Gideon (Indonesia) Kevin Sanjaya Sukamuljo	18–21, 21–23	(silver) Runner-up	
2019	China Open	Super 1000	(Indonesia) Hendra Setiawan	(Indonesia) Marcus Fernaldi Gideon (Indonesia) Kevin Sanjaya Sukamuljo	18–21, 21–17, 15–21	(silver) Runner-up	
2019	Denmark Open	Super 750	(Indonesia) Hendra Setiawan	(Indonesia) Marcus Fernaldi Gideon (Indonesia) Kevin Sanjaya Sukamuljo	14–21, 13–21	(silver) Runner-up	
2019	Hong Kong Open	Super 500	(Indonesia) Hendra Setiawan	(South Korea) Choi Sol-gyu (South Korea) Seo Seung-jae	21–13, 12–21, 13–21	(silver) Runner-up	
2019	BWF World Tour Finals	World Tour Finals	(Indonesia) Hendra Setiawan	(Japan) Hiroyuki Endo (Japan) Yuta Watanabe	24–22, 21–19	(gold) Winner	
2020	Indonesia Masters	Super 500	(Indonesia) Hendra Setiawan	(Indonesia) Marcus Fernaldi Gideon (Indonesia) Kevin Sanjaya Sukamuljo	15–21, 16–21	(silver) Runner-up	
2020	BWF World Tour Finals	World Tour Finals	(Indonesia) Hendra Setiawan	(Chinese Taipei) Lee Yang (Chinese Taipei) Wang Chi-lin	17–21, 21–23	(silver) Runner-up	
2022	India Open	Super 500	(Indonesia) Hendra Setiawan	(India) Satwiksairaj Rankireddy (India) Chirag Shetty	16–21, 24–26	(silver) Runner-up	
2022	All England Open	Super 1000	(Indonesia) Hendra Setiawan	(Indonesia) Muhammad Shohibul Fikri (Indonesia) Bagas Maulana	19–21, 13–21	(silver) Runner-up	
2022	Malaysia Masters	Super 500	(Indonesia) Hendra Setiawan	(Indonesia) Fajar Alfian (Indonesia) Muhammad Rian Ardianto	12–21, 19–21	(silver) Runner-up	
2022	BWF World Tour Finals	World Tour Finals	(Indonesia) Hendra Setiawan	(China) Liu Yuchen (China) Ou Xuanyi	17–21, 21–19, 12–21	(silver) Runner-up	
2023	All England Open	Super 1000	(Indonesia) Hendra Setiawan	(Indonesia) Fajar Alfian (Indonesia) Muhammad Rian Ardianto	17–21, 14–21	(silver) Runner-up	
2024	Australian Open	Super 500	(Indonesia) Hendra Setiawan	(China) He Jiting (China) Ren Xiangyu	11–21, 10–21	(silver) Runner-up	

=== BWF Superseries (9 titles, 5 runners-up) ===
The BWF Superseries, which was launched on 14 December 2006 and implemented in 2007, was a series of elite badminton tournaments, sanctioned by the Badminton World Federation (BWF). BWF Superseries levels were Superseries and Superseries Premier. A season of Superseries consisted of twelve tournaments around the world that had been introduced since 2011. Successful players were invited to the Superseries Finals, which were held at the end of each year.

Men's doubles
Year	Tournament	Partner	Opponent	Score	Result	Ref.
2008	Japan Open	(Indonesia) Bona Septano	(Denmark) Lars Paaske (Denmark) Jonas Rasmussen	21–17, 15–21, 21–13	(silver) Runner-up	
2011	Japan Open	(Indonesia) Bona Septano	(China) Cai Yun (China) Fu Haifeng	13–21, 21–23	(silver) Runner-up	
2013	Malaysia Open	(Indonesia) Hendra Setiawan	(South Korea) Ko Sung-hyun (South Korea) Lee Yong-dae	21–15, 21–13	(gold) Winner	
2013	Indonesia Open	(Indonesia) Hendra Setiawan	(South Korea) Ko Sung-hyun (South Korea) Lee Yong-dae	21–14, 21–18	(gold) Winner	
2013	Singapore Open	(Indonesia) Hendra Setiawan	(South Korea) Ko Sung-hyun (South Korea) Lee Yong-dae	21–15, 21–18	(gold) Winner	
2013	Japan Open	(Indonesia) Hendra Setiawan	(China) Chai Biao (China) Hong Wei	22–20, 21–16	(gold) Winner	
2013	Denmark Open	(Indonesia) Hendra Setiawan	(South Korea) Lee Yong-dae (South Korea) Yoo Yeon-seong	19–21, 16–21	(silver) Runner-up	
2013	World Superseries Finals	(Indonesia) Hendra Setiawan	(South Korea) Kim Gi-jung (South Korea) Kim Sa-rang	21–14, 21–16	(gold) Winner	
2014	All England Open	(Indonesia) Hendra Setiawan	(Japan) Hiroyuki Endo (Japan) Kenichi Hayakawa	21–19, 21–19	(gold) Winner	
2014	Japan Open	(Indonesia) Hendra Setiawan	(South Korea) Lee Yong-dae (South Korea) Yoo Yeon-seong	12–21, 24–26	(silver) Runner-up	
2014	Indonesia Open	(Indonesia) Hendra Setiawan	(South Korea) Lee Yong-dae (South Korea) Yoo Yeon-seong	15–21, 17–21	(silver) Runner-up	
2014	Hong Kong Open	(Indonesia) Hendra Setiawan	(China) Liu Xiaolong (China) Qiu Zihan	21–16, 16–21, 21–17	(gold) Winner	
2015	Malaysia Open	(Indonesia) Hendra Setiawan	(South Korea) Lee Yong-dae (South Korea) Yoo Yeon-seong	14–21, 21–15, 23–21	(gold) Winner	
2015	Dubai World Superseries Finals	(Indonesia) Hendra Setiawan	(China) Chai Biao (China) Hong Wei	13–21, 21–14, 21–14	(gold) Winner	

BWF Super Series Finals tournament
BWF Super Series Premier tournament
BWF Super Series tournament

=== BWF Grand Prix (6 titles, 1 runner-up) ===
The BWF Grand Prix had two levels, the Grand Prix and Grand Prix Gold. It was a series of badminton tournaments sanctioned by the Badminton World Federation (BWF) and played between 2007 and 2017.

Men's doubles
Year	Tournament	Partner	Opponent	Score	Result	Ref.
2009	Philippines Open	(Indonesia) Bona Septano	(Indonesia) Hendra Aprida Gunawan (Indonesia) Alvent Yulianto	10–21, 21–14, 21–17	(gold) Winner	
2010	Vietnam Open	(Indonesia) Bona Septano	(Malaysia) Ong Soon Hock (Malaysia) Mohd Fairuzizuan Tazari	21–18, 13–21, 21–17	(gold) Winner	
2010	Indonesia Grand Prix Gold	(Indonesia) Bona Septano	(Indonesia) Yonathan Suryatama Dasuki (Indonesia) Rian Sukmawan	21–16, 18–17 retired	(gold) Winner	
2010	India Grand Prix	(Indonesia) Bona Septano	(Malaysia) Gan Teik Chai (Malaysia) Tan Bin Shen	19–21, 21–15, 21–14	(gold) Winner	
2011	Indonesia Grand Prix Gold	(Indonesia) Bona Septano	(Japan) Hiroyuki Endo (Japan) Kenichi Hayakawa	21–13, 21–14	(gold) Winner	
2013	Australian Open	(Indonesia) Hendra Setiawan	(Indonesia) Angga Pratama (Indonesia) Rian Agung Saputra	20–22, 19–21	(silver) Runner-up	
2016	Thailand Masters	(Indonesia) Hendra Setiawan	(South Korea) Kim Gi-jung (South Korea) Kim Sa-rang	12–21, 21–15, 21–12	(gold) Winner	

BWF Grand Prix Gold tournament
BWF Grand Prix tournament

=== BWF International Challenge/Series (3 titles, 2 runners-up) ===
Men's doubles
Year	Tournament	Partner	Opponent	Score	Result	Ref.
2007	Smiling Fish International	(Indonesia) Bona Septano	(Hong Kong) Hui Wai Ho (Hong Kong) Alroy Tanama Putra	18–21, 18–21	(silver) Runner-up	
2007	Vietnam International	(Indonesia) Bona Septano	(South Korea) Cho Gun-woo (South Korea) Yoo Yeon-seong	21–15, 21–19	(gold) Winner	
2007	Cheers Asian Satellite	(Indonesia) Bona Septano	(Malaysia) Chang Hun Pin (Malaysia) Khoo Chung Chiat	21–19, 10–21, 21–23	(silver) Runner-up	
2017	China International	(Indonesia) Rian Agung Saputro	(Thailand) Trawut Potieng (Thailand) Nanthakarn Yordphaisong	8–11, 11–7, 11–4, 11–7	(gold) Winner	
2018	Malaysia International	(Indonesia) Hendra Setiawan	(Malaysia) Aaron Chia (Malaysia) Soh Wooi Yik	21–17, 17–21, 21–19	(gold) Winner	

BWF International Challenge tournament
BWF International Series tournament

=== Invitational tournament ===
Men's doubles
Year	Tournament	Partner	Opponent	Score	Result	Ref.
2014	Glory to the King	(Indonesia) Hendra Setiawan	(Thailand) Bodin Isara (Thailand) Pakkawat Vilailak	21–19, 15–21, 21–19	(gold) Winner	

== Performance timeline ==
Key

W	Won	F	Finalist	SF	Semi-finalist
QF	Quarter-finalist	#R	Rounds 4, 3, 2, 1	RR	Round-robin stage
Q#	Qualification round	A	Absent	w/d	Withdrew
G	Gold	S	Silver	B	Bronze
NH	Not held	N/A	Not applicable	DNQ	Did not qualify

=== National team ===
- Junior level

Team event	2005	Ref
Asian Junior Championships	B	

- Senior level

Team events	2007	2009	2010	2011	2012	2013	2014	2015	2016	2017	2018	2019	2020	2021	2022	Ref
SEA Games	A	G	NH	G	NH			A	NH	A	NH	A	NH	A	NH	
Asia Team Championships	NH								G	NH	G	NH	G	NH	A	
Asian Games	NH		B	NH			QF	NH			S	NH				
Universiade	B	NH		A	NH	A	NH	A	NH	A	NH			A	NH	
Thomas Cup	NH		S	NH	QF	NH	B	NH	S	NH	B	NH	G	NH	S	
Sudirman Cup	A	B	NH	B	NH	QF	NH	B	NH	RR	NH	B	NH	DNP	NH	

=== Individual competitions ===
- Junior level

Event	2005	Ref
Asian Junior Championships	B	

- Senior level

Events	2007	2008	2009	2010	2011	2012	2013	2014	2015	2016	2017	2018	2019	2020	2021	2022	2023	Ref
SEA Games	A	NH	B	NH	G	NH	A	NH	A	NH	A	NH	A	NH	A	NH	A	
Asian Championships	2R	A		1R	A				S	2R	2R	2R	2R	NH		2R	QF	
Asian Games	NH			B	NH			G	NH			A	NH				NH	
World Championships			2R	A	B	NH	G	w/d	G	NH	S	A	G	NH	w/d	S	QF	
Olympic Games	NH	DNQ	NH			QF	NH			RR	NH			4th	NH			

Tournament	IBF GP	BWF Superseries / Grand Prix											BWF World Tour								Best	Ref
Tournament	2006	2007	2008	2009	2010	2011	2012	2013	2014	2015	2016	2017	2018	2019	2020	2021	2022	2023	2024	2025	Best	Ref
Malaysia Open	A		Q1	1R	A	SF	2R	W	2R	W	QF	2R	2R	QF	NH		QF	QF	2R	A	W ('13, '15)	
India Open	NH		1R	A		2R	2R	A					SF	A	NH		F	1R	A		F ('22)	
Indonesia Masters	NH				W	W	w/d	QF	A	QF	w/d	NH	1R	F	F	2R	2R	2R	A	2R	W ('10, '11)	
Thailand Masters	NH										W	A				NH		A		Ret.	W ('16)	
German Open	A	1R	1R	A			2R	A					SF	A	NH		A			Ret.	SF ('18)	
French Open	A		2R	QF	A	QF	2R	w/d	A	SF	QF	2R	2R	2R	NH	QF	1R	QF	1R	Ret.	SF ('15)	
All England Open	A		Q1	QF	1R	QF	QF	SF	W	2R	2R	2R	2R	W	QF	2R	F	F	1R	Ret.	W ('14, '19)	
Swiss Open	A			1R	A	QF	w/d	2R	A		w/d	A		QF	NH	A	1R	A		Ret.	QF ('11, '19)	
Thailand Open	A	2R	2R	A	NH	A			NH	A				1R	QF	NH	QF	A	2R	Ret.	SF ('20)	
Thailand Open	A	2R	2R	A	NH	A			NH	A				1R	SF	NH	QF	A	2R	Ret.	SF ('20)	
Malaysia Masters	NH			A		QF	A					2R	A	2R	SF	NH	F	QF	A	Ret.	F ('22)	
Singapore Open	A		2R	A	2R	2R	SF	W	QF	SF	QF	1R	W	F	NH		SF	2R	1R	Ret.	W ('13, '18)	
Indonesia Open	2R	Q1	QF	1R	QF	SF	1R	W	F	SF	2R	1R	1R	F	NH	1R	1R	2R	2R	Ret.	W ('13)	
Australian Open	N/A			A			w/d	F	w/d	1R	2R	A		QF	NH		w/d	2R	F	Ret.	F ('13, '24)	
Canada Open	A		NH		A										NH		A	QF	A	Ret.	QF ('23)	
Japan Open	A		F	2R	SF	F	A	W	F	QF	SF	A	2R	F	NH		2R	QF	1R	Ret.	W ('13)	
Korea Open	A			QF	A	1R	1R	1R	A	QF	QF	A		w/d	NH		SF	w/d	A	Ret.	SF ('22)	
Chinese Taipei Open	A	1R	QF	A						SF	A				NH		A			Ret.	SF ('15)	
Vietnam Open	A	QF	A		W	A						w/d	A		NH		A			Ret.	W ('10)	
Hong Kong Open	A		1R	1R	QF	A	QF	SF	W	SF	SF	QF	SF	F	NH			SF	1R	Ret.	W ('14)	
China Open	A			2R	A	1R	A	1R	1R	2R	1R	SF	2R	F	NH			1R	1R	Ret.	F ('19)	
Macau Open	A	1R	A			QF	A								NH			N/A	A	Ret.	QF ('11)	
Arctic Open	N/A					NH	N/A								NH			SF	2R	Ret.	SF ('23)	
Denmark Open	A		w/d	2R	A	1R	SF	F	QF	2R	1R	1R	SF	F	A	1R	2R	2R	1R	Ret.	F ('13, '19)	.
Hylo Open	A															QF	A			Ret.	QF ('21)	
Japan Masters	NH																	1R	A	Ret.	1R ('23)	
China Masters	A		QF	A	2R	QF	A						SF	QF	NH			2R	1R	Ret.	SF ('18)	
Syed Modi International	NH			A	W	A		NH	A						NH		A			Ret.	W ('10)	
Superseries / World Tour Finals	NH		DNQ			RR	DNQ	W	RR	W	DNQ		RR	W	F	DNQ	F	DNQ		Ret.	W ('13, '15, '19)	
New Zealand Open	A	QF	A		NH	N/A	NH	A						W	NH			N/A		Ret.	W ('19)	
Philippines Open	A		NH	W	NH															Ret.	W ('09)	
Russian Open	NH	1R	A												NH					Ret.	1R ('07)	
Year-end ranking				14	13	7	19	1	4	2	11	15	9	2	2	2	3	13	34	319	1	
Tournament	2006	2007	2008	2009	2010	2011	2012	2013	2014	2015	2016	2017	2018	2019	2020	2021	2022	2023	2024	2025	Best	Ref

== Record against selected opponents ==
Men's doubles results against Year-end Finals finalists, World Championships semi-finalists, and Olympic quarter-finalists paired with:

=== Rian Agung Saputro ===
Players	M	W	L	Diff.
(China) Chai Biao & Hong Wei	1	0	1	–1
(China) He Jiting & Tan Qiang	1	0	1	–1
(China) Li Junhui & Liu Yuchen	3	1	2	–1
(China) Liu Cheng & Zhang Nan	1	0	1	–1
(Chinese Taipei) Chen Hung-ling & Wang Chi-lin	1	1	0	+1
(Denmark) Kim Astrup & Anders Skaarup Rasmussen	2	2	0	+2
(Denmark) Mathias Boe & Carsten Mogensen	1	0	1	–1
(Japan) Takuro Hoki & Yugo Kobayashi	1	1	0	+1
(Japan) Takeshi Kamura & Keigo Sonoda	2	1	1	0
(Malaysia) Goh V Shem & Tan Wee Kiong	1	1	0	+1

=== Bona Septano ===
Players	M	W	L	Diff.
(China) Cai Yun & Fu Haifeng	5	0	5	–5
(China) Chai Biao & Guo Zhendong	5	1	4	–3
(China) Guo Zhendong & Xu Chen	3	0	3	–3
(China) Liu Xiaolong & Qiu Zihan	6	5	1	+4
(Chinese Taipei) Fang Chieh-min & Lee Sheng-mu	5	3	2	+1
(Denmark) Mathias Boe & Carsten Mogensen	6	1	5	–4
(Denmark) Lars Paaske & Jonas Rasmussen	3	1	2	–1
(Indonesia) Markis Kido & Hendra Setiawan	2	1	1	0
(Japan) Hiroyuki Endo & Kenichi Hayakawa	4	4	0	+4
(Japan) Shintaro Ikeda & Shuichi Sakamoto	2	1	1	0
(Japan) Takeshi Kamura & Keigo Sonoda	1	1	0	+1
(Malaysia) Mohd Zakry Abdul Latif & Mohd Fairuzizuan Tazari	3	2	1	+1
(Malaysia) Chan Chong Ming & Chew Choon Eng	1	0	1	–1
(Malaysia) Chan Chong Ming & Koo Kien Keat	1	0	1	–1
(Malaysia) Choong Tan Fook & Lee Wan Wah	2	1	1	0
(Malaysia) Koo Kien Keat & Tan Boon Heong	5	3	2	+1
(South Korea) Jung Jae-sung & Lee Yong-dae	3	0	3	–3
(South Korea) Ko Sung-hyun & Yoo Yeon-seong	6	1	5	–4
(Thailand) Bodin Isara & Maneepong Jongjit	2	1	1	0
(United States) Tony Gunawan & Howard Bach	1	1	0	+1

=== Hendra Setiawan ===
Players	M	W	L	Diff.
(China) Cai Yun & Fu Haifeng	5	4	1	+3
(China) Chai Biao & Hong Wei	4	2	2	0
(China) Fu Haifeng & Zhang Nan	8	3	5	–2
(China) He Jiting & Tan Qiang	2	1	1	0
(China) Liang Weikeng & Wang Chang	6	2	4	–2
(China) Li Junhui & Liu Yuchen	14	6	8	–2
(China) Liu Cheng & Zhang Nan	2	2	0	+2
(China) Liu Xiaolong & Qiu Zihan	5	3	2	+1
(China) Liu Yuchen & Ou Xuanyi	5	1	4	–3
(Chinese Taipei) Chen Hung-ling & Wang Chi-lin	4	2	2	0
(Chinese Taipei) Lee Sheng-mu & Tsai Chia-hsin	8	7	1	+6
(Chinese Taipei) Lee Yang & Wang Chi-lin	12	6	6	0
(Denmark) Kim Astrup & Anders Skaarup Rasmussen	12	7	5	+2
(Denmark) Mathias Boe & Carsten Mogensen	6	5	1	+4
(England) Marcus Ellis & Chris Langridge	5	5	0	+5
(India) Satwiksairaj Rankireddy & Chirag Shetty	8	4	4	0
(Indonesia) Fajar Alfian & Muhammad Rian Ardianto	7	3	4	–1
(Indonesia) Marcus Fernaldi Gideon & Kevin Sanjaya Sukamuljo	13	2	11	–9
(Japan) Hiroyuki Endo & Kenichi Hayakawa	10	9	1	+8
(Japan) Hiroyuki Endo & Yuta Watanabe	8	6	2	+4
(Japan) Takuro Hoki & Yugo Kobayashi	6	3	3	0
(Japan) Takeshi Kamura & Keigo Sonoda	8	6	2	+4
(Malaysia) Mohd Zakry Abdul Latif & Mohd Fairuzizuan Tazari	1	1	0	+1
(Malaysia) Aaron Chia & Soh Wooi Yik	13	8	5	+3
(Malaysia) Goh V Shem & Tan Wee Kiong	8	7	1	+6
(Malaysia) Koo Kien Keat & Tan Boon Heong	3	1	2	–1
(Malaysia) Ong Yew Sin & Teo Ee Yi	4	3	1	+2
(Russia) Vladimir Ivanov & Ivan Sozonov	6	6	0	+6
(South Korea) Kang Min-hyuk & Seo Seung-jae	7	2	5	–3
(South Korea) Kim Gi-jung & Kim Sa-rang	9	7	2	+5
(South Korea) Ko Sung-hyun & Lee Yong-dae	3	3	0	+3
(South Korea) Ko Sung-hyun & Shin Baek-cheol	6	3	3	0
(South Korea) Lee Yong-dae & Yoo Yeon-seong	13	6	7	–1
(Thailand) Bodin Isara & Maneepong Jongjit	1	1	0	+1
