= Markis Kido =

Indonesian badminton player (1984–2021)

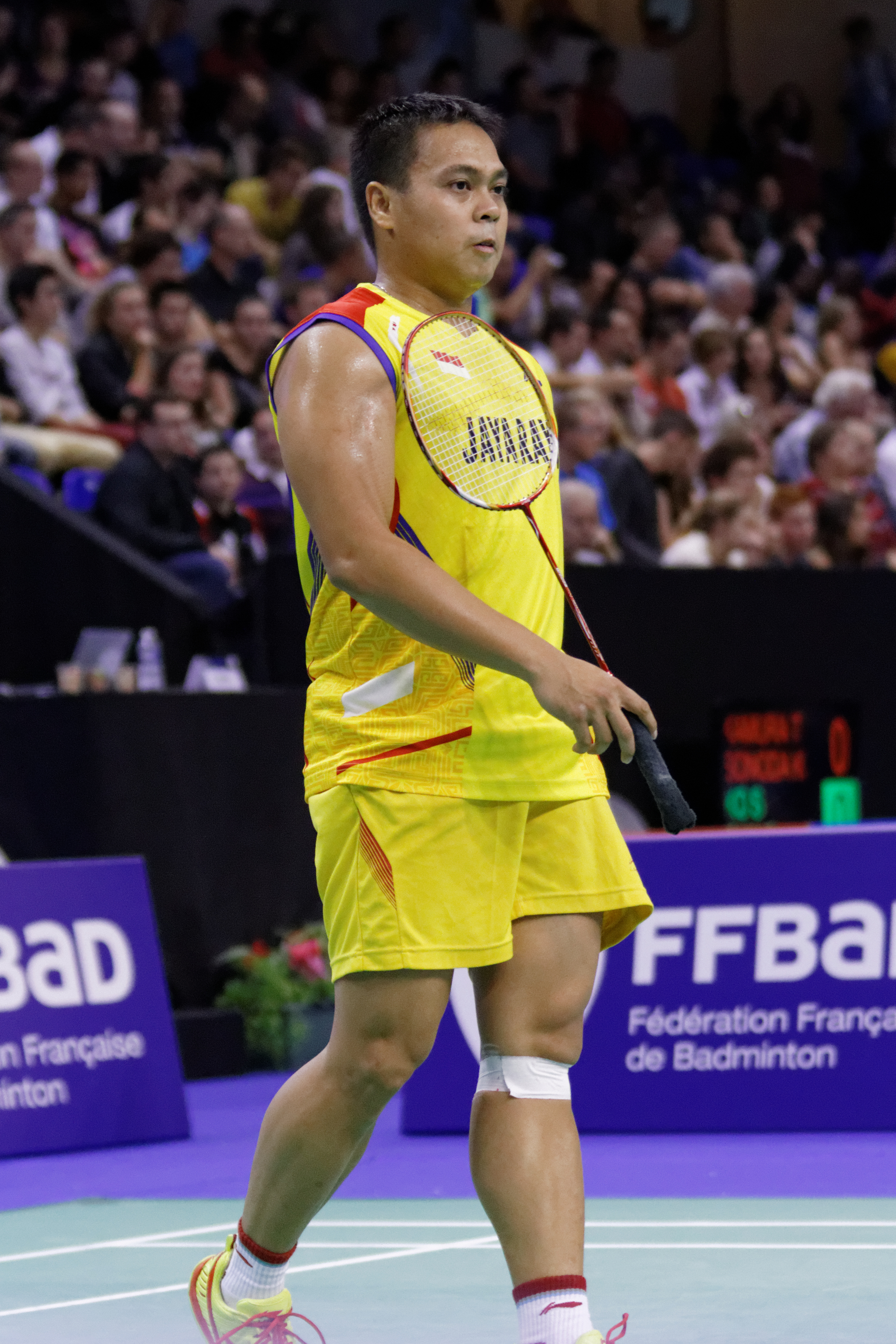
- Kido at the 2013 French Open Superseries

Personal information
- Born: 11 August 1984 Jakarta, Indonesia
- Died: 14 June 2021 (aged 36) Tangerang, Indonesia
- Height: 1.68 m (5 ft 6 in)
- Weight: 62 kg (137 lb)

Sport
- Country: Indonesia
- Sport: Badminton
- Handedness: Right

Men's doubles
- Highest ranking: 1 (with Hendra Setiawan 27 September 2007)
- BWF profile
Medal record
Men's badminton
Representing Indonesia
Olympic Games
Gold medal – first place	2008 Beijing	Men's doubles
World Championships
Gold medal – first place	2007 Kuala Lumpur	Men's doubles
Bronze medal – third place	2010 Paris	Men's doubles
World Cup
Gold medal – first place	2006 Yiyang	Men's doubles
Sudirman Cup
Silver medal – second place	2007 Glasgow	Mixed team
Bronze medal – third place	2009 Guangzhou	Mixed team
Thomas Cup
Silver medal – second place	2010 Kuala Lumpur	Men's team
Bronze medal – third place	2006 Sendai & Tokyo	Men's team
Bronze medal – third place	2008 Jakarta	Men's team
Asian Games
Gold medal – first place	2010 Guangzhou	Men's doubles
Bronze medal – third place	2006 Doha	Men's doubles
Bronze medal – third place	2006 Doha	Men's team
Bronze medal – third place	2010 Guangzhou	Men's team
Asian Championships
Gold medal – first place	2005 Hyderabad	Men's doubles
Gold medal – first place	2009 Suwon	Men's doubles
Silver medal – second place	2003 Jakarta	Men's doubles
SEA Games
Gold medal – first place	2003 Vietnam	Men's team
Gold medal – first place	2005 Manila	Men's doubles
Gold medal – first place	2007 Nakhon Ratchasima	Men's doubles
Gold medal – first place	2007 Nakhon Ratchasima	Men's team
Gold medal – first place	2009 Vientiane	Men's doubles
Gold medal – first place	2009 Vientiane	Men's team
Gold medal – first place	2011 Jakarta–Palembang	Men's team
Silver medal – second place	2005 Manila	Men's team
Silver medal – second place	2011 Jakarta–Palembang	Men's doubles
World Junior Championships
Bronze medal – third place	2000 Guangzhou	Boys' doubles
Bronze medal – third place	2000 Guangzhou	Mixed team
Bronze medal – third place	2002 Pretoria	Mixed doubles
Bronze medal – third place	2002 Pretoria	Mixed team
Asian Junior Championships
Gold medal – first place	2002 Kuala Lumpur	Mixed doubles
Gold medal – first place	2002 Kuala Lumpur	Boys' team
Silver medal – second place	2000 Kyoto	Boys' team
Bronze medal – third place	2002 Kuala Lumpur	Boys' doubles

Markis Kido (11 August 1984 – 14 June 2021) was an Indonesian badminton player specializing in men's doubles. As a former world number 1, he won the discipline's gold medal at the 2006 World Cup, 2007 World Championships, 2008 Olympic Games, 2009 Asia Championships, and 2010 Asian Games with Hendra Setiawan.

== Career ==
In 2005, with Hendra Setiawan, he won the Asian Badminton Championships and the Indonesia Open. In 2006, the pair also won the Jakarta Satellite, the Hong Kong Open and the China Open after defeating Cai Yun and Fu Haifeng 21–16, 21–16 at the finals.

In 2007, Kido and Setiawan became World Champions after defeating Jung Jae-sung and Lee Yong-dae from South Korea, 21–19 and 21–19, at the World Championships finals in Kuala Lumpur, Malaysia. 2007 was a very big year for them. They also won the China Super Series after beating China's Guo Zhendong and Xie Zhongbo 21–12, 21–19 in the finals, and the World Cup after defeating Malaysia's Lin Woon Fui and Mohd Fairuzizuan Mohd Tazari 21–18, 21–15 in the finals at Yiyang, Hunan. They were runners-up at the China Masters Super Series, losing the final to China's Cai Yun and Fu Haifeng, 15–21, 16–21. In September, they won the Chinese Taipei Grand Prix Gold event. In December 2007, they won the Hong Kong Super Series, defeating the famous veterans Tony Gunawan and Candra Wijaya 21–12, 18–21, 21–13 in the finals. At the 2007 SEA Games in Thailand, they helped the Indonesian team win the gold medal in the men's team event, and won gold in men's doubles at the individual event after beating the Indonesian born pair Hendri Kurniawan Saputra and Hendra Wijaya who represented Singapore, 21–17 and 21–12.

In January 2008, they won the Malaysian Super Series. Later that year they teamed to capture their most prestigious prize, the Olympic gold medal in men's doubles at the 2008 Summer Olympics held in Beijing, China. They defeated the Chinese pair of Cai Yun and Fu Haifeng 12–21, 21–11, 21–16 in a thrilling match which more than avenged their loss to the same pair at the China Masters the previous summer.

2008 Summer Olympics – men's doubles
Round	Partner	Opponent	Score	Result
1st	(Indonesia) Hendra Setiawan [1]	(China) Guo Zhendong (China) Xie Zhongbo	22–20, 10–21, 21–17	Win
QF	(Indonesia) Hendra Setiawan [1]	(Malaysia) Koo Kien Keat (Malaysia) Tan Boon Heong	21–16, 21–18	Win
SF	(Indonesia) Hendra Setiawan [1]	(Denmark) Lars Paaske (Denmark) Jonas Rasmussen	21–19, 21–17	Win
Final	(Indonesia) Hendra Setiawan [1]	(China) Cai Yun [2] (China) Fu Haifeng	12–21, 21–11, 21–16	Gold

In September 2008, they took the 2008 China Masters Super Series after beating China's Sun Junjie and Xu Chen in straight sets in the final round. In October 2008, Kido and Setiawan teamed to win the Denmark Super Series after beating China's Fu Haifeng and Shen Ye 21–18, 21–19 in the finals. They captured the French Super Series in early November 2008 after beating yet another Chinese pairing, Cai Yun and Xu Chen, in the final round.

In September 2009, Kido and Setiawan won the Japan Super Series after beating another Indonesian pair, Yonatan Suryatama Dasuki and Rian Sukmawan 21–19 and 24–22 in the final round. In October 2009, they won the French Super Series. On 17 December 2009, they defeated Malaysian duo Koo Kien Keat and Tan Boon Heong to win gold at the 2009 SEA Games in Vientiane, Laos.

They continued their domination to win the gold medal at the 2010 Asian Games in Guangzhou after beating Koo Kien Keat and Tan Boon Heong. They won all their round matches of the competition in 3 games as well.

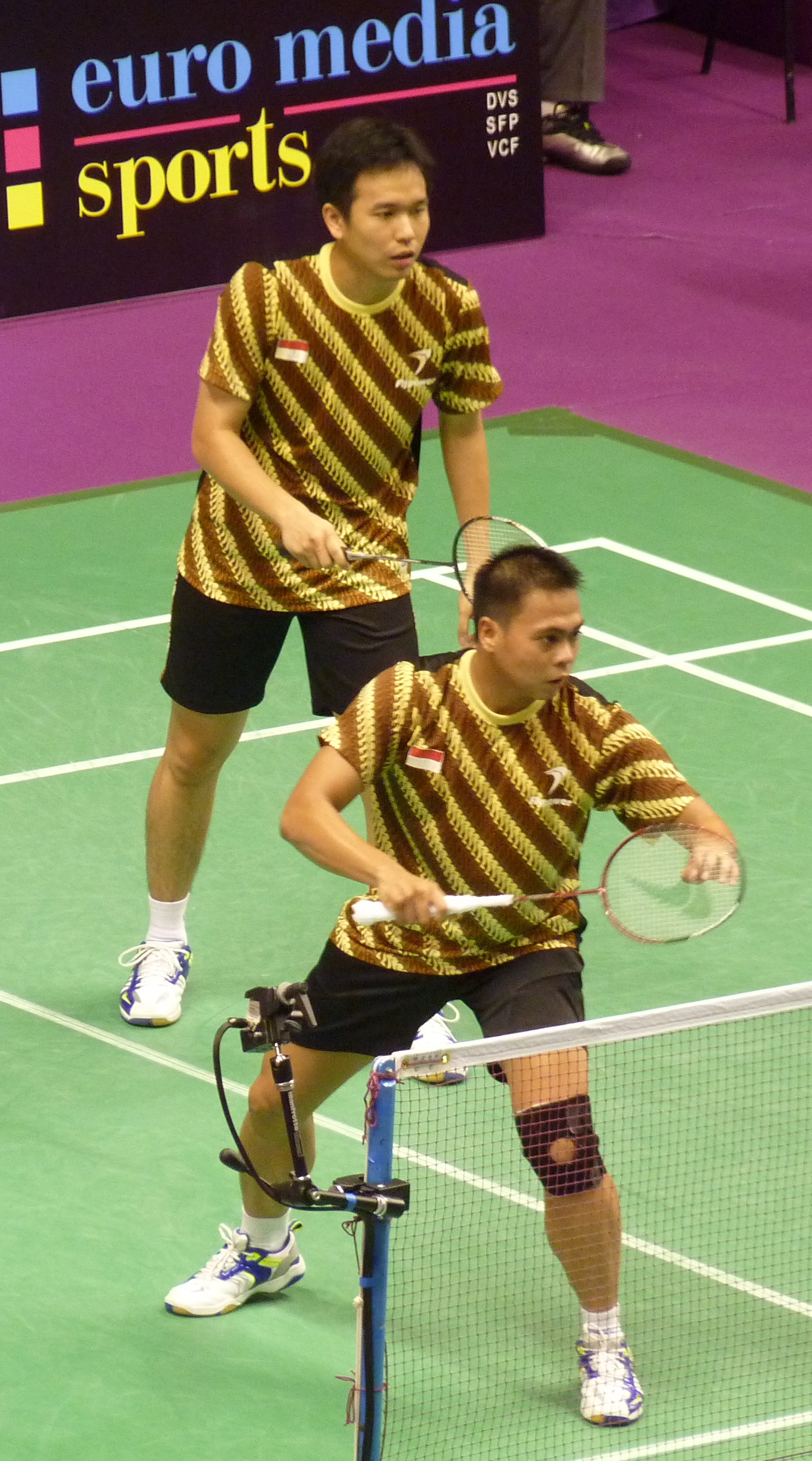
Hendra Setiawan and Kido at 2010 BWF World Championships

=== Participation in Indonesian national team ===
- Three times at Thomas Cup (2006, 2008, 2010)
- Two times at Sudirman Cup (2007, 2009)

== Personal life ==
Kido's brother, Bona Septano, and sister, Pia Zebadiah Bernadet, are also Indonesian national badminton players.

On 14 June 2021, Kido died from an apparent heart attack during a badminton friendly match.

== Awards and nominations ==
Award	Year	Category	Result	Ref.
Government of Indonesia Awards	2008	Parama Krida Utama – Class 1	Honored	
AORI	2010	Best Male Athlete with Hendra Setiawan	Won	

== Achievements ==
=== Olympic Games ===
Men's doubles
Year	Venue	Partner	Opponent	Score	Result	Ref.
2008	Beijing University of Technology Gymnasium, Beijing, China	(Indonesia) Hendra Setiawan	(China) Cai Yun (China) Fu Haifeng	12–21, 21–11, 21–16	Gold	

=== BWF World Championships ===
Men's doubles
Year	Venue	Partner	Opponent	Score	Result	Ref.
2007	Putra Indoor Stadium, Kuala Lumpur, Malaysia	(Indonesia) Hendra Setiawan	(South Korea) Jung Jae-sung (South Korea) Lee Yong-dae	21–19, 21–19	Gold	
2010	Stade Pierre de Coubertin, Paris, France	(Indonesia) Hendra Setiawan	(China) Cai Yun (China) Fu Haifeng	16–21, 13–21	Bronze	

=== World Cup ===
Men's doubles
Year	Venue	Partner	Opponent	Score	Result	Ref.
2006	Olympic Park, Yiyang, China	(Indonesia) Hendra Setiawan	(Malaysia) Lin Woon Fui (Malaysia) Fairuzizuan Tazari	21–18, 21–15	Gold	

=== Asian Games ===
Men's doubles
Year	Venue	Partner	Opponent	Score	Result	Ref.
2006	Aspire Hall 3, Doha, Qatar	(Indonesia) Hendra Setiawan	(Malaysia) Koo Kien Keat (Malaysia) Tan Boon Heong	16–21, 13–21	Bronze	
2010	Tianhe Gymnasium, Guangzhou, China	(Indonesia) Hendra Setiawan	(Malaysia) Koo Kien Keat (Malaysia) Tan Boon Heong	16–21, 26–24, 21–19	Gold	

=== Asian Championships ===
Men's doubles
Year	Venue	Partner	Opponent	Score	Result	Ref.
2003	Tennis Indoor Gelora Bung Karno, Jakarta, Indonesia	(Indonesia) Hendra Setiawan	(South Korea) Lee Dong-soo (South Korea) Yoo Yong-sung	10–15, 11–15	Silver	
2005	Gachibowli Indoor Stadium, Hyderabad, India	(Indonesia) Hendra Setiawan	(South Korea) Jung Jae-sung (South Korea) Lee Jae-jin	15–11, 15–7	Gold	
2009	Suwon Indoor Stadium, Suwon, South Korea	(Indonesia) Hendra Setiawan	(South Korea) Ko Sung-hyun (South Korea) Yoo Yeon-seong	21–18, 26–24	Gold	

=== SEA Games ===
Men's doubles
Year	Venue	Partner	Opponent	Score	Result	Ref.
2005	PhilSports Arena, Pasig, Philippines	(Indonesia) Hendra Setiawan	(Indonesia) Luluk Hadiyanto (Indonesia) Alvent Yulianto	15–8, 7–15, 15–6	Gold	
2007	Wongchawalitkul University, Nakhon Ratchasima, Thailand	(Indonesia) Hendra Setiawan	(Singapore) Hendri Kurniawan Saputra (Singapore) Hendra Wijaya	21–17, 21–12	Gold	
2009	Gym Hall 1, National Sports Complex, Vientiane, Laos	(Indonesia) Hendra Setiawan	(Malaysia) Koo Kien Keat (Malaysia) Tan Boon Heong	21–17, 21–17	Gold	
2011	Istora Senayan, Jakarta, Indonesia	(Indonesia) Hendra Setiawan	(Indonesia) Mohammad Ahsan (Indonesia) Bona Septano	23–25, 10–21	Silver	

=== World Junior Championships ===
Boys' doubles
Year	Venue	Partner	Opponent	Score	Result	Ref.
2000	Tianhe Gymnasium, Guangzhou, China	(Indonesia) Hendra Aprida Gunawan	(China) Sang Yang (China) Zheng Bo	4–7, 3–7, 0–7	Bronze	

Mixed doubles
Year	Venue	Partner	Opponent	Score	Result	Ref.
2002	Pretoria Showgrounds, Pretoria, South Africa	(Indonesia) Liliyana Natsir	(China) Cao Chen (China) Rong Lu	4–11, 1–11	Bronze	

=== Asian Junior Championships ===
Boys' doubles
Year	Venue	Partner	Opponent	Score	Result	Ref.
2002	Kuala Lumpur Badminton Stadium, Kuala Lumpur, Malaysia	(Indonesia) Rian Sukmawan	(Malaysia) Koo Kien Keat (Malaysia) Ong Soon Hock	15–17, 11–15	Bronze	

Mixed doubles
Year	Venue	Partner	Opponent	Score	Result	Ref.
2002	Kuala Lumpur Badminton Stadium, Kuala Lumpur, Malaysia	(Indonesia) Liliyana Natsir	(China) Cao Chen (China) Rong Lu	11–4, 11–3	Gold	

=== BWF Superseries (10 titles, 5 runners-up) ===
The BWF Superseries, which was launched on 14 December 2006 and implemented in 2007, is a series of elite badminton tournaments, sanctioned by the Badminton World Federation (BWF). BWF Superseries levels are Superseries and Superseries Premier. A season of Superseries consists of twelve tournaments around the world that have been introduced since 2011. Successful players are invited to the Superseries Finals, which are held at the end of each year.

Men's doubles
Year	Tournament	Partner	Opponent	Score	Result	Ref.
2007	China Masters	(Indonesia) Hendra Setiawan	(China) Cai Yun (China) Fu Haifeng	15–21, 16–21	(silver) Runner-up	
2007	China Open	(Indonesia) Hendra Setiawan	(China) Guo Zhendong (China) Xie Zhongbo	21–12, 21–19	(gold) Winner	
2007	Hong Kong Open	(Indonesia) Hendra Setiawan	(United States) Tony Gunawan (Indonesia) Candra Wijaya	21–12, 18–21, 21–13	(gold) Winner	
2008	Malaysia Open	(Indonesia) Hendra Setiawan	(Denmark) Lars Paaske (Denmark) Jonas Rasmussen	21–10, 20–22, 21–18	(gold) Winner	
2008	Swiss Open	(Indonesia) Hendra Setiawan	(South Korea) Jung Jae-sung (South Korea) Lee Yong-dae	21–17, 16–21, 13–21	(silver) Runner-up	
2008	China Masters	(Indonesia) Hendra Setiawan	(China) Sun Junjie (China) Xu Chen	21–17, 24–22	(gold) Winner	
2008	Denmark Open	(Indonesia) Hendra Setiawan	(China) Fu Haifeng (China) Shen Ye	21–18, 21–19	(gold) Winner	
2008	French Open	(Indonesia) Hendra Setiawan	(China) Cai Yun (China) Xu Chen	21–15, 21–12	(gold) Winner	
2009	Singapore Open	(Indonesia) Hendra Setiawan	(England) Anthony Clark (England) Nathan Robertson	12–21, 11–21	(silver) Runner-up	
2009	Japan Open	(Indonesia) Hendra Setiawan	(Indonesia) Yonathan Suryatama Dasuki (Indonesia) Rian Sukmawan	21–19, 24–22	(gold) Winner	
2009	French Open	(Indonesia) Hendra Setiawan	(Malaysia) Koo Kien Keat (Malaysia) Tan Boon Heong	15–21, 21–15, 21–14	(gold) Winner	
2010	Denmark Open	(Indonesia) Hendra Setiawan	(Denmark) Mathias Boe (Denmark) Carsten Mogensen	13–21, 12–21	(silver) Runner-up	
2010	Hong Kong Open	(Indonesia) Hendra Setiawan	(South Korea) Ko Sung-hyun (South Korea) Yoo Yeon-seong	19–21, 21–14, 21–23	(silver) Runner-up	
2012	Singapore Open	(Indonesia) Hendra Setiawan	(South Korea) Ko Sung-hyun (South Korea) Yoo Yeon-seong	22–20, 11–21, 21–6	(gold) Winner	
2013	French Open	(Indonesia) Marcus Fernaldi Gideon	(Malaysia) Koo Kien Keat (Malaysia) Tan Boon Heong	21–16, 21–18	(gold) Winner	

BWF Super Series Finals tournament
BWF Super Series Premier tournament
BWF Super Series tournament

=== BWF Grand Prix (10 titles, 3 runners-up) ===
The BWF Grand Prix had two levels, the BWF Grand Prix and Grand Prix Gold. It was a series of badminton tournaments sanctioned by the Badminton World Federation (BWF) which was held from 2007 to 2017. The World Badminton Grand Prix was sanctioned by International Badminton Federation (IBF) from 1983 to 2006.

Men's doubles
Year	Tournament	Partner	Opponent	Score	Result	Ref.
2004	Denmark Open	(Indonesia) Hendra Setiawan	(Denmark) Lars Paaske (Denmark) Jonas Rasmussen	6–15, 13–15	(silver) Runner-up	
2005	Indonesia Open	(Indonesia) Hendra Setiawan	(Indonesia) Sigit Budiarto (Indonesia) Candra Wijaya	15–10, 12–15, 15–3	(gold) Winner	
2006	Indonesia Open	(Indonesia) Hendra Setiawan	(United States) Tony Gunawan (Indonesia) Candra Wijaya	11–21, 16–21	(silver) Runner-up	
2006	Hong Kong Open	(Indonesia) Hendra Setiawan	(Malaysia) Choong Tan Fook (Malaysia) Lee Wan Wah	8–21, 21–19, 22–20	(gold) Winner	
2006	China Open	(Indonesia) Hendra Setiawan	(China) Cai Yun (China) Fu Haifeng	21–16, 21–16	(gold) Winner	
2007	Chinese Taipei Open	(Indonesia) Hendra Setiawan	(Denmark) Lars Paaske (Denmark) Jonas Rasmussen	21–17, 21–12	(gold) Winner	
2010	Malaysia Grand Prix Gold	(Indonesia) Hendra Setiawan	(Indonesia) Hendra Aprida Gunawan (Indonesia) Alvent Yulianto	8–21, 21–17, 21–12	(gold) Winner	
2012	Australian Open	(Indonesia) Hendra Setiawan	(Chinese Taipei) Fang Chieh-min (Chinese Taipei) Lee Sheng-mu	21–16, 21–15	(gold) Winner	
2012	Dutch Open	(Indonesia) Alvent Yulianto	(Malaysia) Gan Teik Chai (Malaysia) Ong Soon Hock	18–21, 21–13, 21–14	(gold) Winner	
2014	Indonesian Masters	(Indonesia) Marcus Fernaldi Gideon	(Indonesia) Selvanus Geh (Indonesia) Kevin Sanjaya Sukamuljo	21–17, 20–22, 21–14	(gold) Winner	

Mixed doubles
Year	Tournament	Partner	Opponent	Score	Result	Ref.
2010	Indonesia Grand Prix Gold	(Indonesia) Lita Nurlita	(Indonesia) Tontowi Ahmad (Indonesia) Liliyana Natsir	11–21, 13–21	(silver) Runner-up	
2012	Vietnam Open	(Indonesia) Pia Zebadiah Bernadet	(Malaysia) Tan Aik Quan (Malaysia) Lai Pei Jing	23–21, 21–8	(gold) Winner	
2013	Thailand Open	(Indonesia) Pia Zebadiah Bernadet	(Indonesia) Riky Widianto (Indonesia) Richi Puspita Dili	18–21, 21–15, 21–15	(gold) Winner	

BWF Grand Prix Gold tournament
BWF Grand Prix tournament

=== BWF International Challenge/Series (1 runner-up) ===
Men's doubles
Year	Tournament	Partner	Opponent	Score	Result	Ref.
2018	Indonesia International	(Indonesia) Irfan Fadhilah	(Indonesia) Rian Swastedian (Indonesia) Amri Syahnawi	19–21, 18–21	(silver) Runner-up	

BWF International Challenge tournament
BWF International Series tournament

== Performance timeline ==
Key

W	Won	F	Finalist	SF	Semi-finalist
QF	Quarter-finalist	#R	Rounds 4, 3, 2, 1	RR	Round-robin stage
Q#	Qualification round	A	Absent	w/d	Withdrew
G	Gold	S	Silver	B	Bronze
NH	Not held	N/A	Not applicable	DNQ	Did not qualify

=== National team ===
- Junior level

Team events	2000	2002
Asian Junior Championships	S	G
World Junior Championships	B	B

- Senior level

Team events	2003	2004	2005	2006	2007	2008	2009	2010	2011
SEA Games	G	NH	S	NH	G	NH	G	NH	G
Asian Games	NH			B	NH			B	NH
Thomas Cup	NH		NH	B	NH	B	NH	S	NH
Sudirman Cup		NH		NH	S	NH	B	NH	A

=== Individual competitions ===
- Junior level

Events	2000	2002
Asian Junior Championships		B (BD); G (XD)
World Junior Championships	B (BD)	B (XD)

- Senior level

Events	2003	2004	2005	2006	2007	2008	2009	2010	2011	2012	2013	2014
SEA Games	QF	NH	G	NH	G	NH	G	NH	S	NH	A	NH
Asian Championships	S	A	G	QF	A		G	A	QF (MD); 2R (XD)	A	1R (MD); 2R (XD)	A
Asian Games	NH			B	NH			G	NH			A
World Championships	A	NH	A	QF	G	NH	w/d	B	w/d (MD) w/d (XD)	NH	3R (MD)	3R (MD); 2R (XD)
Olympic Games	NH	DNQ	NH			G	NH			A	NH	

Tournament	2018	Best
BWF World Tour
Malaysia Masters	1R	W ('10)
Indonesia Masters	1R	W ('14)
Indonesia Masters Super 100	1R	1R ('18)

Tournament	2007	2008	2009	2010	2011	2012	2013	2014	2015	2016	2017	Best
BWF Superseries
All England Open	2R	1R	A	SF	QF (MD); Q2 (XD)	2R	1R (MD); SF (XD)	SF (MD); 2R (XD)	1R (MD); 1R (XD)	A		SF ('10, '13, '14)
Swiss Open	A	F	A	1R	N/A							F ('08)
India Open	NH	N/A			A			1R (MD); 2R (XD)	A			2R ('14)
Malaysia Open	SF	W	SF	A		QF (MD); Q1 (XD)	2R; 1R (XD)	QF (MD); QF (XD)	2R (MD); 2R (XD)	1R (MD); 1R (XD)	A	W ('08)
Singapore Open	SF	w/d	F	SF (MD); 1R (XD)	2R	W (MD); 1R (XD)	2R (MD); 1R (XD)	1R (MD); 1R (XD)	1R (MD); 2R (XD)	1R (MD); 1R (XD)	1R	W ('12)
Australian Open	N/A							2R (MD); SF (XD)	2R (MD); 1R (XD)	2R	A	W ('12)
Indonesia Open	QF	QF	SF	2R (MD); 1R (XD)	SF (MD); 1R (XD)	SF (MD); QF (XD)	QF (MD); 2R (XD)	QF (MD); 1R (XD)	1R (MD); 1R (XD)	1R (MD); 1R (XD)	2R	W ('05)
Japan Open	SF	QF	W	w/d (MD); 2R (XD)	SF	2R	1R (MD); QF (XD)	A	1R (MD); 1R (XD)	A		W ('09)
Korea Open	QF	2R	2R	A	2R (MD); 1R (XD)	2R(MD); Q1 (XD)	1R (MD); QF (XD)	A				SF ('06)
China Masters	F	W	A		2R	A	QF (MD); SF (XD)	N/A				W ('08)
Denmark Open	SF	W	SF	F	SF	1R (MD); QF (XD)	2R (MD); 2R (XD)	QF (MD); 1R (XD)	A			W ('08)
French Open	QF	W	W	SF	2R	Q2 (MD); 1R (XD)	W (MD); 2R (XD)	QF (MD); QF (XD)	A			W ('08, '09, '13)
China Open	W		2R	w/d	QF	2R	2R (MD); 2R (XD)	A	1R (XD)	A		W ('06, '07)
Hong Kong Open	W	QF	QF	F (MD); 1R (XD)	A	2R (MD); 2R (XD)	QF (MD); QF (XD)	2R (MD); 1R (XD)	A	2R	A	W ('06, '07)
BWF Superseries Finals	NH	SF	DNQ	RR	DNQ		RR (XD)	DNQ				SF ('08)

Tournament	2007	2008	2009	2010	2011	2012	2013	2014	2015	2016	2017	Best
BWF Grand Prix and Grand Prix Gold
Malaysia Masters	NH		A	W (MD); SF (XD)	2R (MD); 2R (XD)	w/d	SF (MD); 2R (XD)	SF	QF (MD); 1R (XD)	2R	SF	W ('10)
Thailand Masters	NH									1R (MD); 2R (XD)	A	2R ('16)
Syed Modi International	NH		A				NH	w/d	A			–
German Open	A					QF	A					SF ('05)
Swiss Open	N/A				A	2R	SF (MD); QF (XD)	QF (MD); QF (XD)	1R (MD); 1R (XD)	A		F ('08)
Australian Open	N/A		A			W	QF (XD)	N/A				W ('12)
New Zealand Open	A			NH	N/A	NH	A		SF (MD); SF (XD)	A		SF ('15)
Chinese Taipei Open	W	A			QF	QF (MD); 2R (XD)	A	1R (MD); SF (XD)	1R (MD); 2R (XD)	1R	A	W ('07)
Vietnam Open	A					QF (MD); W (XD)	A		QF (XD)	2R	2R	W ('12)
Thailand Open	A			NH	A		QF (MD); W (XD)	NH	2R (MD); 2R (MD)	2R	1R	W ('13)
Dutch Open	A					W (MD); SF (XD)	A					W ('12)
Macau Open	SF	A		SF (MD); 1R (XD)	QF	SF (MD); 1R (XD)	A		QF (MD); 1R (XD)	2R	A	SF ('07, '10, '12)
Indonesian Masters	NH			QF (MD); F (XD)	2R	2R (MD); SF (XD)	SF (MD); 2R (XD)	W	SF (MD); 2R (XD)	QF	NH	W ('14)

Tournament	1998	2001	2002	2003	2004	2005	2006	Best
IBF World Grand Prix
All England Open	A					1R	2R	2R ('06)
Swiss Open	A					QF	A	QF ('05)
German Open	NH	A				SF	A	SF ('05)
Thailand Open	NH	1R (MS)	NH	1R	QF	A		QF ('04)
Malaysia Open	A			2R	QF	2R	A	QF ('04)
Indonesia Open	1R (MS)	Q3 (MS)	2R (MD); 1R (XD)	3R	2R	W	F	W ('05)
Denmark Open	A				F	A		F ('04)
Singapore Open		1R (MS)	A		2R	2R	1R	2R ('04, '05)
Japan Open	A					QF	A	QF ('05)
China Open	NH	A		1R	2R	1R	W	W ('06)
Korea Open	NH	A				1R	SF	SF ('06)
Hong Kong Open	A		NH	A	NH	2R	W	W ('06)

== Record against selected opponents ==
Men's doubles results with Marcus Fernaldi Gideon against World Superseries finalists, World Superseries Finals semifinalists, World Championships semifinalists, and Olympic quarterfinalists.

- (China) Chai Biao & Hong Wei 0–2
- (China) Qiu Zihan & Liu Xiaolong 1–2
- (China) Zhang Nan & Fu Haifeng 1–0
- (Denmark) Mads Pieler Kolding & Mads Conrad-Petersen 0–2
- (Denmark) Mathias Boe & Carsten Mogensen 1–1
- (Indonesia) Mohammad Ahsan & Hendra Setiawan 0–3
- (Japan) Hiroyuki Endo & Kenichi Hayakawa 1–0
- (South Korea) Ko Sung-hyun & Shin Baek-cheol 2–1
- (South Korea) Lee Yong-dae & Yoo Yeon-seong 0–1
- (Malaysia) Goh V Shem & Lim Khim Wah 0–1
- (Malaysia) Tan Boon Heong & Koo Kien Keat 1–0
- (Malaysia) Tan Wee Kiong & Hoon Thien How 1–0

Men's doubles results with Hendra Setiawan against World Superseries finalists, World Superseries Finals semifinalists, World Championships semifinalists, and Olympic quarterfinalists.

- (China) Cai Yun & Xu Chen 2–0
- (China) Chai Biao & Guo Zhendong 1–1
- (China) Chai Biao & Zhang Nan 1–0
- (China) Fu Haifeng & Cai Yun 3–6
- (China) Fu Haifeng & Shen Ye 1–0
- (China) Guo Zhendong & Xie Zhongbo 3–0
- (China) Guo Zhendong & Xu Chen 2–0
- (China) Hong Wei & Shen Ye 0–2
- (China) Sang Yang & Zheng Bo 0–1
- (China) Sun Junjie & Xu Chen 2–0
- (Chinese Taipei) Fang Chieh-min & Lee Sheng-mu 7–4
- (Denmark) Jens Eriksen & Martin Lundgaard Hansen 4–1
- (Denmark) Lars Paaske & Jonas Rasmussen 7–5
- (Denmark) Mathias Boe & Carsten Mogensen 1–5
- (England) Anthony Clark & Nathan Robertson 1–1
- (England) Anthony Clark & (Scotland) Robert Blair 0–2
- (Germany) Johannes Schöttler & Ingo Kindervater 0–1
- (Indonesia) Angga Pratama & Rian Agung Saputro 2–0
- (Indonesia) Bona Septano & Mohammad Ahsan 1–1
- (Indonesia) Candra Wijaya & Sigit Budiarto 1–0
- (Indonesia) Candra Wijaya & (United States) Tony Gunawan 4–3
- (Indonesia) Eng Hian & Flandy Limpele 1–2
- (Indonesia) Hendra Aprida Gunawan & Alvent Yulianto 4–3
- (Indonesia) Luluk Hadiyanto & Alvent Yulianto 2–3
- (Indonesia) Rian Sukmawan & Yonathan Suryatama Dasuki 3–1
- (Japan) Hirokatsu Hashimoto & Noriyasu Hirata 3–2
- (Japan) Kenichi Hayakawa & Hiroyuki Endo 3–1
- (Japan) Keita Masuda & Tadashi Ōtsuka 5–1
- (Japan) Shintaro Ikeda & Shuichi Sakamoto 1–0
- (South Korea) Jung Jae-sung & Lee Yong-dae 5–7
- (South Korea) Kim Dong-moon & Ha Tae-kwon 0–1
- (South Korea) Kim Gi-jung & Kim Sa-rang 0–1
- (South Korea) Ko Sung-hyun & Lee Yong-dae 1–0
- (South Korea) Ko Sung-hyun & Yoo Yeon-seong 3–2
- (South Korea) Lee Jae-jin & Hwang Ji-man 1–0
- (South Korea) Shin Baek-cheol & Cho Gun-woo 1–0
- (Malaysia) Chan Chong Ming & Chew Choon Eng 1–0
- (Malaysia) Chan Chong Ming & Koo Kien Keat 1–0
- (Malaysia) Choong Tan Fook & Lee Wan Wah 6–2
- (Malaysia) Gan Teik Chai & Lin Woon Fui 2–0
- (Malaysia) Goh V Shem & Lim Khim Wah 1–0
- (Malaysia) Hoon Thien How & Tan Wee Kiong 1–0
- (Malaysia) Koo Kien Keat & Tan Boon Heong 4–6
- (Malaysia) Mohd Zakry Abdul Latif & Mohd Fairuzizuan Mohd Tazari 7–0
- (Poland) Robert Mateusiak & Michał Łogosz 3–0
- (United States) Howard Bach & Khan Malaythong 1–0
- (United States) Howard Bach & Tony Gunawan 2–1
