= 2017 Malaysia Super Series Premier =

Tournament details
- Dates: 4–9 April 2017
- Level: Super Series Premier
- Total prize money: US$600,000
- Venue: Stadium Perpaduan
- Location: Kuching, Malaysia

Champions
- Men's singles: (China) Lin Dan
- Women's singles: (Chinese Taipei) Tai Tzu-ying
- Men's doubles: (Indonesia) Marcus Fernaldi Gideon (Indonesia) Kevin Sanjaya Sukamuljo
- Women's doubles: (Japan) Yuki Fukushima (Japan) Sayaka Hirota
- Mixed doubles: (China) Zheng Siwei (China) Chen Qingchen

The 2017 Malaysia Super Series Premier was the third super series tournament of the 2017 BWF Super Series. The tournament took place in Kuching, Malaysia from April 4 – 9, 2017 and had a total purse of $600,000.

== Men's singles ==
=== Seeds ===
1. (Malaysia) Lee Chong Wei (final)
2. (Denmark) Jan Ø. Jørgensen (withdrew)
3. (China) Chen Long (quarterfinals)
4. (Denmark) Viktor Axelsen (second round)
5. (South Korea) Son Wan-ho (semifinals)
6. (China) Tian Houwei (first round)
7. (China) Lin Dan (champion)
8. (Hong Kong) Ng Ka Long (second round)

=== Top half ===
First Round
1	(Malaysia) Lee C W	21	21
(England) R Ouseph	16	18
(Denmark) A Antonsen	17	21	10
(Hong Kong) Hu Y	21	19	21
6	(China) Tian HW	17	16
Q3	(France) B Leverdez	21	21
Q4	(South Korea) Jeon H-j	22	25
PFQ	(South Korea) Lee D-k	20	23
3	(China) Chen L	21	21
(Hong Kong) Wei N	4	9
(Indonesia) S D Kuncoro	17	9
(China) Huang YX	21	21
8	(Hong Kong) Ng K L	20	21	21
(Chinese Taipei) Wang T-w	22	17	19
(China) Shi YQ	20	21	18
(Hong Kong) Wong W K	22	10	21

Second Round
1	(Malaysia) Lee C W	21	21
(Hong Kong) Hu Y	8	6
Q3	(France) B Leverdez	13	10
Q4	(South Korea) Jeon H-j	21	21
3	(China) Chen L	16	21	21
(China) Huang YX	21	18	10
8	(Hong Kong) Ng K L	10	21	17
(Hong Kong) Wong W K	21	15	21

Quarterfinals
1	(Malaysia) Lee C W	21	21
Q4	(South Korea) Jeon H-j	11	14
3	(China) Chen L
(Hong Kong) Wong W K	w	/	o

Semifinals
1	(Malaysia) Lee C W	21	21
(Hong Kong) Wong W K	12	9

=== Bottom half ===
First Round
(Indonesia) T Sugiarto	21	21
(Germany) M Zwiebler	13	9
Q2	(Japan) T Ueda	12	17
5	(South Korea) Son W-h	21	21
(India) A Jayaram	21	21
(China) Qiao B	11	8
Q1	(Malaysia) Liew D	12	13
4	(Denmark) V Axelsen	21	21
(Thailand) T Saensomboonsuk	21	21
(Chinese Taipei) Hsu J-h	19	14
PFQ	(India) B. S Praneeth	21	19	18
7	(China) Lin D	18	21	21
(Denmark) H-K Vittinghus	20	12
(Chinese Taipei) Chou T-c	22	21
(Indonesia) J Christie	21	21
PFQ	(Indonesia) A S Ginting	17	12

Second Round
(Indonesia) T Sugiarto	15	15
5	(South Korea) Son W-h	21	21
(India) A Jayaram	9	21	21
4	(Denmark) V Axelsen	21	14	19
(Thailand) T Saensomboonsuk	8	13
7	(China) Lin D	21	21
(Chinese Taipei) Chou T-c	23	17	19
(Indonesia) J Christie	21	21	21

Quarterfinals
5	(South Korea) Son W-h	21	21
(India) A Jayaram	18	14
7	(China) Lin D	21	14	21
(Indonesia) J Christie	15	21	9

Semifinals
5	(South Korea) Son W-h	25	21	16
7	(China) Lin D	27	19	21

=== Finals ===
Semifinals
1	(Malaysia) Lee Chong Wei	21	21
(Hong Kong) Wong Wing Ki	12	9
6	(South Korea) Son Wan-ho	25	21	16
7	(China) Lin Dan	27	19	21

Final
1	(Malaysia) Lee Chong Wei	19	14
7	(China) Lin Dan	21	21

== Women's singles ==
=== Seeds ===
1. (Chinese Taipei) Tai Tzu-ying (champion)
2. (Spain) Carolina Marín (final)
3. (South Korea) Sung Ji-Hyun (semifinals)
4. (Japan) Akane Yamaguchi (quarterfinals)
5. (China) Sun Yu (quarterfinals)
6. (India) P. V. Sindhu (first round)
7. (Thailand) Ratchanok Intanon (quarterfinals)
8. (China) He Bingjiao (first round)

=== Top half ===
First Round
1	(Chinese Taipei) Tai T-y	21	21
PFQ	(Indonesia) L A Mainaky	12	10
(Chinese Taipei) Pai Y-p	16	21	21
Q2	(Malaysia) Lim Y F	21	16	16
6	(India) P. V. Sindhu	21	19	17
(China) Chen YF	18	21	21
Q3	(Indonesia) Y Y Susanto	15	22	17
(Malaysia) Goh J W	21	20	21
3	(South Korea) Sung J-h	21	21
(Japan) M Mitani	18	15
(Chinese Taipei) Lee C-h	21	16	21
(South Korea) Kim H-m	16	21	16
5	(China) Sun Y	21	22
(Malaysia) S Cheah	11	20
(United States) B Zhang	21	21
(Russia) K Polikarpova	14	12

Second Round
1	(Chinese Taipei) Tai T-y	21	21
(Chinese Taipei) Pai Y-p	6	8
(China) Chen YF	21	21
(Malaysia) Goh J W	14	12
3	(South Korea) Sung J-h	21	23
(Chinese Taipei) Lee C-h	7	21
5	(China) Sun Y	16	21	21
(United States) B Zhang	21	15	14

Quarterfinals
1	(Chinese Taipei) Tai T-y	21	20	24
(China) Chen YF	17	22	22
3	(South Korea) Sung J-h	21	21
5	(China) Sun Y	11	15

Semifinals
1	(Chinese Taipei) Tai T-y	20	21	21
3	(South Korea) Sung J-h	22	13	12

=== Bottom half ===
First Round
Q1	(Indonesia) M Mawarti	9	4
(Japan) N Okuhara	21	21
(Hong Kong) Cheung N Y	21	21
8	(China) He BJ	13	12
Q4	(Chinese Taipei) Chen S-y	16	21	22
(Denmark) L Kjaersfeldt	21	19	20
(India) S Nehwal	21	13	15
4	(Japan) A Yamaguchi	19	21	21
(Thailand) B Ongbamrungphan	21	21
(Chinese Taipei) Hsu Y-c	10	7
(Japan) S Sato	18	10
7	(Thailand) R Intanon	21	21
(Chinese Taipei) Chiang M-h	15	20
(Thailand) N Jindapol	21	22
(Hong Kong) Yip P Y	16	11
2	(Spain) C Marín	21	21

Second Round
(Japan) N Okuhara	21	21
(Hong Kong) Cheung N Y	8	19
Q4	(Chinese Taipei) Chen S-y	16	14
4	(Japan) A Yamaguchi	21	21
(Thailand) B Ongbamrungphan	21	18
7	(Thailand) R Intanon	23	21
(Thailand) N Jindapol	14	18
2	(Spain) C Marín	21	21

Quarterfinals
(Japan) N Okuhara	21	22
4	(Japan) A Yamaguchi	18	20
7	(Thailand) R Intanon	8	21	12
2	(Spain) C Marín	21	18	21

Semifinals
(Japan) N Okuhara	21	19
2	(Spain) C Marín	23	21

=== Finals ===
Semifinals
1	(Chinese Taipei) Tai Tzu-ying	20	21	21
3	(South Korea) Sung Ji-hyun	22	13	12
(Japan) Nozomi Okuhara	21	19
2	(Spain) Carolina Marín	23	21

Final
1	(Chinese Taipei) Tai Tzu-ying	23	22	21
2	(Spain) Carolina Marín	25	20	13

== Men's doubles ==
=== Seeds ===
1. (Malaysia) Goh V Shem / Tan Wee Kiong (first round)
2. (Japan) Takeshi Kamura / Keigo Sonoda (semifinals)
3. (China) Chai Biao / Hong Wei (semifinals)
4. (Indonesia) Marcus Fernaldi Gideon / Kevin Sanjaya Sukamuljo (champion)
5. (China) Li Junhui / Liu Yuchen (quarterfinals)
6. (Denmark) Mads Conrad-Petersen / Mads Pieler Kolding (first round)
7. (Indonesia) Angga Pratama / Ricky Karanda Suwardi (first round)
8. (Denmark) Kim Astrup / Anders Skaarup Rasmussen (second round)

=== Top half ===
First Round
1	(Malaysia) Goh V S (Malaysia) Tan W K	17	21
Q1	(Hong Kong) Or C C (Hong Kong) Tang C M	21	23
Q2	(Indonesia) H Setiawan (Malaysia) Tan B H	10	21	19
(Indonesia) M Ahsan (Indonesia) R A Saputro	21	15	21
6	(Denmark) M Conrad-Petersen (Denmark) M Pieler Kolding	19	21	10
(Malaysia) Ong Y S (Malaysia) Teo E Y	21	16	21
(China) Fu HF (China) Zheng SW	22	17	21
(Russia) V Ivanov (Russia) I Sozonov	20	21	14
3	(China) Chai B (China) Hong W	21	21
(Singapore) D B Chrisnanta (Singapore) H Wijaya	15	13
(Chinese Taipei) Lee J-h (Chinese Taipei) Lee Y	20	16
(Malaysia) Chooi K M (Malaysia) Low J S	22	21
8	(Denmark) K Astrup (Denmark) A S Rasmussen	17	21	21
(Chinese Taipei) Chen H-l (Chinese Taipei) Wang C-l	21	17	18
(Denmark) M Christiansen (Denmark) D Daugaard	27	14	10
(Thailand) K Kedren (Thailand) D Puavaranukroh	25	21	21

Second Round
Q1	(Hong Kong) Or C C (Hong Kong) Tang C M	21	16	21
(Indonesia) M Ahsan (Indonesia) R A Saputro	18	21	18
(Malaysia) Ong Y S (Malaysia) Teo E Y	12	11
(China) Fu HF (China) Zheng SW	21	21
3	(China) Chai B (China) Hong W	21	21
(Malaysia) Chooi K M (Malaysia) Low J S	6	19
8	(Denmark) K Astrup (Denmark) A S Rasmussen	19	22	18
(Thailand) K Kedren (Thailand) D Puavaranukroh	21	20	21

Quarterfinals
Q1	(Hong Kong) Or C C (Hong Kong) Tang C M	18	18
(China) Fu HF (China) Zheng SW	21	21
3	(China) Chai B (China) Hong W	21	20	21
(Thailand) K Kedren (Thailand) D Puavaranukroh	19	22	16

Semifinals
(China) Fu HF (China) Zheng SW	17	21	21
3	(China) Chai B (China) Hong W	21	14	19

=== Bottom half ===
First Round
Q4	(Japan) H Endo (Japan) Y Watanabe	21	15	19
(Indonesia) F Alfian (Indonesia) M R Ardianto	19	21	21
(Hong Kong) Law C H (Hong Kong) Lee C H	11	10
5	(China) Li JH (China) Liu YC	21	21
(Chinese Taipei) Lee S-m (Chinese Taipei) Tsai C-h	15	14
(China) Liu C (China) Zhang N	21	21
(Japan) T Hoki (Japan) Y Kobayashi	9	19
4	(Indonesia) M F Gideon (Indonesia) K S Sukamuljo	21	21
(Chinese Taipei) Lu C-y (Chinese Taipei) Yang P-h	24	14	21
(England) M Ellis (England) C Langridge	22	21	14
(Thailand) B Issara (Thailand) N Puangpuapech	21	16	21
7	(Indonesia) A Pratama (Indonesia) R K Suwardi	18	21	16
Q3	(Chinese Taipei) Liao K-h (Chinese Taipei) Lu C-p	18	21	21
(India) M Attri (India) B. S Reddy	21	18	17
(China) Huang KX (China) Wang YL	13	12
2	(Japan) T Kamura (Japan) K Sonoda	21	21

Second Round
(Indonesia) F Alfian (Indonesia) M R Ardianto	21	17	11
5	(China) Li JH (China) Liu YC	15	21	21
(China) Liu C (China) Zhang N	21	16
4	(Indonesia) M F Gideon (Indonesia) K S Sukamuljo	23	21
(Chinese Taipei) Lu C-y (Chinese Taipei) Yang P-h	11	14
(Thailand) B Issara (Thailand) N Puangpuapech	21	21
Q3	(Chinese Taipei) Liao K-h (Chinese Taipei) Lu C-p	12	15
2	(Japan) T Kamura (Japan) K Sonoda	21	21

Quarterfinals
5	(China) Li JH (China) Liu YC	21	17	17
4	(Indonesia) M F Gideon (Indonesia) K S Sukamuljo	7	21	21
(Thailand) B Issara (Thailand) N Puangpuapech	16	19
2	(Japan) T Kamura (Japan) K Sonoda	21	21

Semifinals
4	(Indonesia) M F Gideon (Indonesia) K S Sukamuljo	21	21
2	(Japan) T Kamura (Japan) K Sonoda	16	13

=== Finals ===
Semifinals
(China) Fu Haifeng (China) Zheng Siwei	17	21	21
3	(China) Chai Biao (China) Hong Wei	21	14	19
4	(Indonesia) Marcus Fernaldi Gideon (Indonesia) Kevin Sanjaya Sukamuljo	21	21
2	(Japan) Takeshi Kamura (Japan) Keigo Sonoda	16	13

Final
(China) Fu Haifeng (China) Zheng Siwei	14	21	12
4	(Indonesia) Marcus Fernaldi Gideon (Indonesia) Kevin Sanjaya Sukamuljo	21	14	21

== Women's doubles ==
=== Seeds ===
1. (Japan) Misaki Matsutomo / Ayaka Takahashi (semifinals)
2. (Denmark) Kamilla Rytter Juhl / Christinna Pedersen (quarterfinals)
3. (South Korea) Jung Kyung-eun / Shin Seung-chan (second round)
4. (China) Chen Qingchen / Jia Yifan (quarterfinals)
5. (South Korea) Chang Ye-na / Lee So-hee (semifinals)
6. (China) Luo Ying / Luo Yu (second round)
7. (Japan) Naoko Fukuman / Kurumi Yonao (second round)
8. (China) Huang Dongping / Li Yinhui (quarterfinals)

=== Top half ===
First Round
1	(Japan) M Matsutomo (Japan) A Takahashi	21	21
(India) A Ponnappa (India) N. S Reddy	19	15
(Indonesia) A S Awanda (Indonesia) N K M Istirani	21	21	21
(Malaysia) Lim Y L (Malaysia) Yap C W	23	11	17
8	(China) Huang DP (China) Li YH	21	18	21
(Hong Kong) Poon L Y (Hong Kong) Tse Y S	17	21	14
(Japan) S Tanaka (Japan) K Yonemoto	16	21	22
(Thailand) J Kititharakul (Thailand) R Prajongjai	21	15	20
4	(China) Chen QC (China) Jia YF	21	21
PFQ	(England) L Smith (England) S Walker	13	14
Q3	(Indonesia) D Fitriani (Indonesia) N Melati	18	14
(Malaysia) Chow M K (Malaysia) Lee M Y	21	21
7	(Japan) N Fukuman (Japan) K Yonao	14	21	21
(Chinese Taipei) Hsu Y-c (Chinese Taipei) Wu T-j	21	14	19
(South Korea) Chae Y-j (South Korea) Kim H-n	13	14
(Japan) Y Fukushima (Japan) S Hirota	21	21

Second Round
1	(Japan) M Matsutomo (Japan) A Takahashi	21	24
(Indonesia) A S Awanda (Indonesia) N K M Istirani	17	22
8	(China) Huang DP (China) Li YH	21	16	21
(Japan) S Tanaka (Japan) K Yonemoto	10	21	14
4	(China) Chen QC (China) Jia YF	21	18	25
(Malaysia) Chow M K (Malaysia) Lee M Y	17	21	23
7	(Japan) N Fukuman (Japan) K Yonao	20	12
(Japan) Y Fukushima (Japan) S Hirota	22	21

Quarterfinals
1	(Japan) M Matsutomo (Japan) A Takahashi	18	21	21
8	(China) Huang DP (China) Li YH	21	14	17
4	(China) Chen QC (China) Jia YF	18	23
(Japan) Y Fukushima (Japan) S Hirota	21	25

Semifinals
1	(Japan) M Matsutomo (Japan) A Takahashi	18	19
(Japan) Y Fukushima (Japan) S Hirota	21	21

=== Bottom half ===
First Round
(China) Huang YQ (China) Tang JH	21	21
(Chinese Taipei) Chiang K-h (Chinese Taipei) Hung S-h	12	13
Q4	(Malaysia) Joyce Choong W C (Malaysia) Tee J Y	14	18
6	(China) Luo Y (China) Luo Y	21	21
(Malaysia) Vivian Hoo K M (Malaysia) Woon K W	21	17	26
Q2	(China) Bao YX (China) Yu XH	13	21	28
(India) S Santosh (India) A S Sunil	12	8
3	(South Korea) Jung K-e (South Korea) Shin S-c	21	21
(Indonesia) K N Hanadia (Indonesia) D T Permatasari	10	16
(Bulgaria) G Stoeva (Bulgaria) S Stoeva	21	21
(Thailand) P Supajirakul (Thailand) S Taerattanachai	14	8
5	(South Korea) Chang Y-n (South Korea) Lee S-h	21	21
(Denmark) M Fruergaard (Denmark) S Thygesen	21	10	12
(Indonesia) D D Haris (Indonesia) R E Putri Sari	18	21	21
Q1	(Chinese Taipei) Lin X-m (Chinese Taipei) Wu F-c	8	14
2	(Denmark) K Rytter Juhl (Denmark) C Pedersen	21	21

Second Round
(China) Huang YQ (China) Tang JH	21	21
6	(China) Luo Y (China) Luo Y	17	12
Q2	(China) Bao YX (China) Yu XH	21	21
3	(South Korea) Jung K-e (South Korea) Shin S-c	13	13
(Bulgaria) G Stoeva (Bulgaria) S Stoeva	9	9
5	(South Korea) Chang Y-n (South Korea) Lee S-h	21	21
(Indonesia) D D Haris (Indonesia) R E Putri Sari	17	13
2	(Denmark) K Rytter Juhl (Denmark) C Pedersen	21	21

Quarterfinals
(China) Huang YQ (China) Tang JH	21	21
Q2	(China) Bao YX (China) Yu XH	17	14
5	(South Korea) Chang Y-n (South Korea) Lee S-h	12	21	21
2	(Denmark) K Rytter Juhl (Denmark) C Pedersen	21	15	14

Semifinals
(China) Huang YQ (China) Tang JH	22	18	21
5	(South Korea) Chang Y-n (South Korea) Lee S-h	20	21	16

=== Finals ===
Semifinals
1	(Japan) Misaki Matsutomo (Japan) Ayaka Takahashi	18	19
(Japan) Yuki Fukushima (Japan) Sayaka Hirota	21	21
(China) Huang Yaqiong (China) Tang Jinhua	22	18	21
5	(South Korea) Chang Ye-na (South Korea) Lee So-hee	20	21	16

Final
(Japan) Yuki Fukushima (Japan) Sayaka Hirota	21	18	21
(China) Huang Yaqiong (China) Tang Jinhua	17	21	12

== Mixed doubles ==
=== Seeds ===
1. (China) Zheng Siwei / Chen Qingchen (champion)
2. (Indonesia) Tontowi Ahmad / Liliyana Natsir (semifinals)
3. (Denmark) Joachim Fischer Nielsen / Christinna Pedersen (quarterfinals)
4. (China) Lu Kai / Huang Yaqiong (final)
5. (China) Zhang Nan / Li Yinhui (semifinals)
6. (Indonesia) Praveen Jordan / Debby Susanto (second round)
7. (England) Chris Adcock / Gabrielle Adcock (second round)
8. (Malaysia) Chan Peng Soon / Goh Liu Ying (first round)

=== Top half ===
First Round
1	(China) Zheng SW (China) Chen QC	21	21
(Japan) Y Watanabe (Japan) A Higashino	17	15
(Thailand) B Issara (Thailand) S Amitrapai	21	21
(Indonesia) H Faisal (Indonesia) S D Aulia	8	15
8	(Malaysia) Chan P S (Malaysia) Goh L Y	21	19	17
(Indonesia) E Subaktiar (Indonesia) G E Widjaja	18	21	21
(Hong Kong) Lee C H (Hong Kong) Chau H W	17	21	21
(South Korea) Kim G-j (South Korea) Shin S-c	21	19	17
3	(Denmark) J Fischer Nielsen (Denmark) C Pedersen	21	21
PFQ	(Chinese Taipei) Lu C-y (Chinese Taipei) Chiang K-h	13	15
(Japan) K Kazuno (Japan) A Kurihara	6	21	21
(Malaysia) Tan K M (Malaysia) Lai P J	21	19	13
5	(China) Zhang N (China) Li YH	21	21
(Indonesia) A E Prasetya (Indonesia) A Saufika	14	18
(Hong Kong) Tang C M (Hong Kong) Tse Y S	21	21
Q3	(England) B Lane (England) J Pugh	17	13

Second Round
1	(China) Zheng SW (China) Chen QC	26	21
(Thailand) B Issara (Thailand) S Amitrapai	24	19
(Indonesia) E Subaktiar (Indonesia) G E Widjaja	21	17	14
(Hong Kong) Lee C H (Hong Kong) Chau H W	16	21	21
3	(Denmark) J Fischer Nielsen (Denmark) C Pedersen	21	21
(Japan) K Kazuno (Japan) A Kurihara	13	19
5	(China) Zhang N (China) Li YH	21	21
(Hong Kong) Tang C M (Hong Kong) Tse Y S	15	15

Quarterfinals
1	(China) Zheng SW (China) Chen QC	21	21
(Hong Kong) Lee C H (Hong Kong) Chau H W	16	9
3	(Denmark) J Fischer Nielsen (Denmark) C Pedersen	21	19
5	(China) Zhang N (China) Li YH	23	21

Semifinals
1	(China) Zheng SW (China) Chen QC	21	21
5	(China) Zhang N (China) Li YH	19	14

=== Bottom half ===
First Round
(Thailand) D Puavaranukroh (Thailand) S Taerattanachai	21	18	21
(Denmark) M Christiansen (Denmark) S Thygesen	19	21	14
(Chinese Taipei) Lin C-y (Chinese Taipei) Wu T-j	16	15
7	(England) C Adcock (England) G Adcock	21	21
(China) Wang YL (China) Huang DP	w	/	o
(Malaysia) Goh S H (Malaysia) S J Lai
Q4	(Chinese Taipei) Wang C-l (Chinese Taipei) Lee C-h	18	14
4	(China) Lu K (China) Huang YQ	21	21
Q2	(Malaysia) Hoo P R (Malaysia) Peck Y W	20	16
(South Korea) Choi S-g (South Korea) Chae Y-j	22	21
PFQ	(Thailand) N Puangpuapech (Thailand) J Kititharakul	24	12	12
6	(Indonesia) P Jordan (Indonesia) D Susanto	22	21	21
(India) P J Chopra (India) N. S Reddy	19	21	21
(Denmark) K Astrup (Denmark) L Kjærsfeldt	21	19	23
Q1	(England) M Ellis (England) L Smith	12	14
2	(Indonesia) T Ahmad (Indonesia) L Natsir	21	21

Second Round
(Thailand) D Puavaranukroh (Thailand) S Taerattanachai	21	21
7	(England) C Adcock (England) G Adcock	16	19
(China) Wang YL (China) Huang DP	16	20
4	(China) Lu K (China) Huang YQ	21	22
(South Korea) Choi S-g (South Korea) Chae Y-j	21	14	21
6	(Indonesia) P Jordan (Indonesia) D Susanto	12	21	19
(Denmark) K Astrup (Denmark) L Kjærsfeldt
2	(Indonesia) T Ahmad (Indonesia) L Natsir	w	/	o

Quarterfinals
(Thailand) D Puavaranukroh (Thailand) S Taerattanachai	16	17
4	(China) Lu K (China) Huang YQ	21	21
(South Korea) Choi S-g (South Korea) Chae Y-j	21	21	20
2	(Indonesia) T Ahmad (Indonesia) L Natsir	16	23	22

Semifinals
4	(China) Lu K (China) Huang YQ	21	21
2	(Indonesia) T Ahmad (Indonesia) L Natsir	8	16

=== Finals ===
Semifinals
1	(China) Zheng Siwei (China) Chen Qingchen	21	21
5	(China) Zhang Nan (China) Li Yinhui	19	14
4	(China) Lu Kai (China) Huang Yaqiong	21	21
2	(Indonesia) Tontowi Ahmad (Indonesia) Liliyana Natsir	8	16

Final
1	(China) Zheng Siwei (China) Chen Qingchen	21	21
4	(China) Lu Kai (China) Huang Yaqiong	15	18

Preceded by 2016 Malaysia Super Series Premier	Malaysia Open	Succeeded by 2018 Malaysia Open
Preceded by 2017 India Super Series	BWF Super Series; 2017 BWF Season	Succeeded by 2017 Singapore Super Series
