= 2017 BWF World Championships – Men's doubles =

Internatinal badminton championships

Men's doubles at the BWF World Championships
- Venue: Emirates Arena
- Location: Glasgow, Scotland
- Dates: 21–27 August

Medalists
gold medal	Liu Cheng; Zhang Nan	China
silver medal	Mohammad Ahsan; Rian Agung Saputro	Indonesia
bronze medal	Takeshi Kamura; Keigo Sonoda	Japan
bronze medal	Chai Biao; Hong Wei	China

The men's doubles tournament of the 2017 BWF World Championships (World Badminton Championships) took place from 21 to 27 August.

== Seeds ==
1. (China) Li Junhui / Liu Yuchen (second round)
2. (Denmark) Mathias Boe / Carsten Mogensen (quarterfinals)
3. (Indonesia) Marcus Fernaldi Gideon / Kevin Sanjaya Sukamuljo (quarterfinals)
4. (Japan) Takeshi Kamura / Keigo Sonoda (semifinals)
5. (Malaysia) Goh V Shem / Tan Wee Kiong (second round)
6. (China) Chai Biao / Hong Wei (semifinals)
7. (Denmark) Mads Conrad-Petersen / Mads Pieler Kolding (quarterfinals)
8. (China) Liu Cheng / Zhang Nan (champion)

9. (Indonesia) Angga Pratama / Ricky Karanda Suwardi (third round)
10. (Russia) Vladimir Ivanov / Ivan Sozonov (third round)
11. (Chinese Taipei) Lu Ching-yao / Yang Po-han (third round)
12. (Denmark) Kim Astrup / Anders Skaarup Rasmussen (second round)
13. (China) Huang Kaixiang / Wang Yilyu (third round)
14. (England) Marcus Ellis / Chris Langridge (third round)
15. (Japan) Takuto Inoue / Yuki Kaneko (third round)
16. (Denmark) Mathias Christiansen / David Daugaard (third round)

Click on the seed number of a team to go to their draw section.

== Draw ==
=== Finals ===
Semifinals
(Indonesia) Mohammad Ahsan (Indonesia) Rian Agung Saputro	21	21
4	(Japan) Takeshi Kamura (Japan) Keigo Sonoda	12	15
6	(China) Chai Biao (China) Hong Wei	17	19
8	(China) Liu Cheng (China) Zhang Nan	21	21

Final
(Indonesia) Mohammad Ahsan (Indonesia) Rian Agung Saputro	10	17
8	(China) Liu Cheng (China) Zhang Nan	21	21

=== Section 1 ===
First Round
(Sweden) R Eidestedt (Sweden) N Ruponen	15	18
(Indonesia) M Ahsan (Indonesia) R A Saputro	21	21
(Republic of Ireland) J Magee (Republic of Ireland) S Magee	21	15	14
(France) B Kersaudy (France) J Maio	19	21	21
(India) M Attri (India) B. S Reddy	20	11
(South Korea) Chung E-s (South Korea) Kim D-y	22	21
(Australia) Leung W H (Australia) M Wheller	9	11
(Austria) D Stipsits (Austria) R Zirnwald	21	21

Second Round
1	(China) Li JH (China) Liu YC	21	18	18
(Indonesia) M Ahsan (Indonesia) R A Saputro	19	21	21
16	(Denmark) M Christiansen (Denmark) D Daugaard	21	21
(France) B Kersaudy (France) J Maio	8	17
5	(Malaysia) Goh V S (Malaysia) Tan W K	18	16
(South Korea) Chung E-s (South Korea) Kim D-y	21	21
14	(England) M Ellis (England) C Langridge	21	21
(Austria) D Stipsits (Austria) R Zirnwald	15	10

Third Round
(Indonesia) M Ahsan (Indonesia) R A Saputro	21	21
16	(Denmark) M Christiansen (Denmark) D Daugaard	19	12
(South Korea) Chung E-s (South Korea) Kim D-y	21	18	21
14	(England) M Ellis (England) C Langridge	16	21	15

Quarterfinals
(Indonesia) M Ahsan (Indonesia) R A Saputro	21	21
(South Korea) Chung E-s (South Korea) Kim D-y	16	18

=== Section 2 ===
First Round
(Poland) M Bochat (Poland) A Cwalina	15	14
(Germany) M Lamsfuss (Germany) M E Seidel	21	21
(Canada) A Liu (Canada) T Ng	8	13
(Russia) E Dremin (Russia) D Grachev	21	21
(Netherlands) J Maas (Netherlands) R Tabeling	21	18	17
(Hong Kong) Or C C (Hong Kong) Tang C M	19	21	21
(Italy) L Osele (Italy) K Strobl	8	18
(Russia) K Abramov (Russia) A Zinchenko	21	21

Second Round
4	(Japan) T Kamura (Japan) K Sonoda	19	21	21
(Germany) M Lamsfuss (Germany) M E Seidel	21	15	9
9	(Indonesia) A Pratama (Indonesia) R K Suwardi	21	21
(Russia) E Dremin (Russia) D Grachev	15	16
7	(Denmark) M Conrad-Petersen (Denmark) M P Kolding	21	21
(Hong Kong) Or C C (Hong Kong) Tang C M	16	11
11	(Chinese Taipei) Lu C-y (Chinese Taipei) Yang P-h	21	21
(Russia) K Abramov (Russia) A Zinchenko	15	16

Third Round
4	(Japan) T Kamura (Japan) K Sonoda	21	22	21
9	(Indonesia) A Pratama (Indonesia) R K Suwardi	18	24	15
7	(Denmark) M Conrad-Petersen (Denmark) M P Kolding	21	21
11	(Chinese Taipei) Lu C-y (Chinese Taipei) Yang P-h	12	12

Quarterfinals
4	(Japan) T Kamura (Japan) K Sonoda	21	23
7	(Denmark) M Conrad-Petersen (Denmark) M P Kolding	13	21

=== Section 3 ===
First Round
(Mauritius) A Lubah (Mauritius) G J Paul	16	21	18
(Belgium) M Dierickx (Belgium) F Golinski	21	10	21
(Germany) J R Jansen (Germany) J Zurwonne	21	21
(Poland) P Prądziński (Poland) J Rudziński	10	12
(Scotland) M Campbell (Scotland) P MacHugh	21	21
(Netherlands) J Arends (Netherlands) R Jille	13	18
(England) P Briggs (England) T Wolfenden	17	10
(Chinese Taipei) Liao K-h (Chinese Taipei) Lu C-p	21	21

Second Round
(Belgium) M Dierickx (Belgium) F Golinski	9	7
13	(China) Huang KX (China) Wang YL	21	21
(Germany) J R Jansen (Germany) J Zurwonne	29	13	14
6	(China) Chai B (China) Hong W	27	21	21
(Scotland) M Campbell (Scotland) P MacHugh	14	14
10	(Russia) V Ivanov (Russia) I Sozonov	21	21
(Chinese Taipei) Liao K-h (Chinese Taipei) Lu C-p	13	21	9
3	(Indonesia) M F Gideon (Indonesia) K S Sukamuljo	21	14	21

Third Round
13	(China) Huang KX (China) Wang YL	21	12	18
6	(China) Chai B (China) Hong W	14	21	21
10	(Russia) V Ivanov (Russia) I Sozonov	19	16
3	(Indonesia) M F Gideon (Indonesia) K S Sukamuljo	21	21

Quarterfinals
6	(China) Chai B (China) Hong W	11	21	22
3	(Indonesia) M F Gideon (Indonesia) K S Sukamuljo	21	19	20

=== Section 4 ===
First Round
(India) Arjun M.R. (India) R Shlok	14	21	14
(Chinese Taipei) Liao M-c (Chinese Taipei) Su C-h	21	19	21
(Japan) H Endo (Japan) Y Watanabe	21	21
(India) S Rankireddy (India) C Shetty	8	12
(Japan) T Hoki (Japan) Y Kobayashi	20	21	21
(Hong Kong) Law C H (Hong Kong) Lee C H	22	19	14
(Trinidad and Tobago) N Bonkowsky (United States) M Fogarty	2	4
(Malaysia) Chooi K M (Malaysia) Low J S	21	21

Second Round
(Chinese Taipei) Liao M-c (Chinese Taipei) Su C-h	22	21	21
12	(Denmark) K Astrup (Denmark) A S Rasmussen	24	13	12
(Japan) H Endo (Japan) Y Watanabe	9	15
8	(China) Liu C (China) Zhang N	21	21
(Japan) T Hoki (Japan) Y Kobayashi	16	23
15	(Japan) T Inoue (Japan) Y Kaneko	21	25
(Malaysia) Chooi K M (Malaysia) Low J S	16	17
2	(Denmark) M Boe (Denmark) C Mogensen	21	21

Third Round
(Chinese Taipei) Liao M-c (Chinese Taipei) Su C-h	14	13
8	(China) Liu C (China) Zhang N	21	21
15	(Japan) T Inoue (Japan) Y Kaneko	20	21	12
2	(Denmark) M Boe (Denmark) C Mogensen	22	19	21

Quarterfinals
8	(China) Liu C (China) Zhang N	20	21	22
2	(Denmark) M Boe (Denmark) C Mogensen	22	11	20
