= 2013 Swiss Open Grand Prix Gold =

Tournament details
- Dates: March 12, 2013 - March 17, 2013
- Total prize money: US$125,000
- Venue: St. Jakobshalle
- Location: Basel, Switzerland

Champions
- Men's singles: (China) Wang Zhengming
- Women's singles: (China) Wang Shixian
- Men's doubles: (China) Chai Biao (China) Hong Wei
- Women's doubles: (South Korea) Jung Kyung-eun (South Korea) Kim Ha-na
- Mixed doubles: (Denmark) Joachim Fischer Nielsen (Denmark) Christinna Pedersen

The 2013 Swiss Open Grand Prix Gold was a badminton tournament held in St. Jakobshalle, Basel, Switzerland from March 12 until March 17, 2013. It was the second grand prix gold and grand prix tournament of the 2013 BWF Grand Prix Gold and Grand Prix. It had a total purse of $125,000.

== Men's singles ==
=== Seeds ===
1. (China) Du Pengyu (final)
2. (Indonesia) Sony Dwi Kuncoro (withdrew)
3. (Hong Kong) Hu Yun (semi-final)
4. (Denmark) Jan Ø. Jørgensen (semi-final)
5. (India) Kashyap Parupalli (third round)
6. (Malaysia) Daren Liew (second round)
7. (Thailand) Boonsak Ponsana (second round)
8. (Denmark) Hans-Kristian Vittinghus (quarter-final)
9. (Malaysia) Chong Wei Feng (quarter-final)
10. (Hong Kong) Wong Wing Ki (third round)
11. (China) Wang Zhengming (champion)
12. (Denmark) Viktor Axelsen (second round)
13. (Japan) Takuma Ueda (quarter-final)
14. (Indonesia) Dionysius Hayom Rumbaka (third round)
15. (Chinese Taipei) Chou Tien-chen (quarter-final)
16. (Chinese Taipei) Hsu Jen-hao (third round)

=== Finals ===
Quarterfinals
1 | (China) Du Pengyu | 21 | 21
8 | (Denmark) Hans-Kristian Vittinghus | 13 | 19
3 | (Hong Kong) Hu Yun | 23 | 21
13 | (Japan) Takuma Ueda | 21 | 11
9 | (Malaysia) Chong Wei Feng | 21 | 14 | 14
4 | (Denmark) Jan Ø. Jørgensen | 13 | 21 | 21
15 | (Chinese Taipei) Chou Tien-chen | 14 | 15
11 | (China) Wang Zhengming | 21 | 21

Semifinals
1 | (China) Du Pengyu | 21 | 17 | 21
3 | (Hong Kong) Hu Yun | 8 | 21 | 14
4 | (Denmark) Jan Ø. Jørgensen | 21 | 7 | 13
11 | (China) Wang Zhengming | 18 | 21 | 21

Final
1 | (China) Du Pengyu | 18 | 18
11 | (China) Wang Zhengming | 21 | 21

=== Top half ===
==== Section 1 ====
First Round
1 | (China) Du PY | 21 | 21
(Finland) V Lang | 15 | 5
PFR | (Germany) T Wadenka | 9 | 11
(Thailand) T Saensomboonsuk | 21 | 21
16 | (Chinese Taipei) Hsu J-h | 21 | 21
(Austria) R Gnedt | 3 | 14
(Malaysia) R Misbun | 22 | 18 | 21
(Slovenia) I Utrosa | 20 | 21 | 19

Second Round
1 | (China) Du PY | 17 | 28 | 21
(Thailand) T Saensomboonsuk | 21 | 26 | 14
16 | (Chinese Taipei) Hsu J-h | 21 | 21
(Malaysia) R Misbun | 18 | 16

Third Round
1 | (China) Du PY | 13 | 21 | 21
16 | (Chinese Taipei) Hsu J-h | 21 | 11 | 15

==== Section 2 ====
First Round
8 | (Denmark) H Vittinghus | 21 | 21
(Switzerland) N Blondel | 9 | 8
(Denmark) C Thomsen | 21 | 23
(Germany) A Trisnanto | 16 | 21
14 | (Indonesia) D Rumbaka | 11 | 21 | 23
(India) S Varma | 21 | 18 | 21
(Czech Republic) P Koukal | 21 | 14 | 21
(Russia) V Malkov | 12 | 21 | 12

Second Round
8 | (Denmark) H Vittinghus | 19 | 21 | 6
(Denmark) C Thomsen | 21 | 17 | 2^{r}
14 | (Indonesia) D Rumbaka | 15 | 21 | 21
(Czech Republic) P Koukal | 21 | 12 | 10

Third Round
8 | (Denmark) H Vittinghus | 21 | 21
14 | (Indonesia) D Rumbaka | 12 | 15

==== Section 3 ====
First Round
3 | (Hong Kong) Hu Y | 21 | 21
(Switzerland) L Nussbaumer | 10 | 9
(Lithuania) K Navickas | 21 | 21
(Germany) P Discher | 11 | 14
12 | (Denmark) V Axelsen | 21 | 21
(France) M Lo Ying Ping | 14 | 10
PFR | (Switzerland) K Schaffluetzel | 1 | 14
(Netherlands) E Pang | 21 | 21

Second Round
3 | (Hong Kong) Hu Y | 14 | 21 | 21
(Lithuania) K Navickas | 21 | 7 | 15
12 | (Denmark) V Axelsen | 21 | 18 | 17
(Netherlands) E Pang | 16 | 21 | 21

Third Round
3 | (Hong Kong) Hu Y | 21 | 21
(Netherlands) E Pang | 17 | 10

==== Section 4 ====
First Round
6 | (Malaysia) D Liew | 21 | 21
PFR | (Malaysia) S Misbun | 14 | 19
(Malaysia) A Abdul Latif | 21 | 21
(Germany) Y Pratama | 17 | 16
13 | (Japan) T Ueda | 21 | 21
(Germany) L Schmidt | 9 | 18
(Sweden) G Ulldahl | 21 | 21
(Singapore) D Wong | 18 | 17

Second Round
6 | (Malaysia) D Liew | 15 | 17
(Malaysia) A Abdul Latif | 21 | 21
13 | (Japan) T Ueda | 21 | 21
(Sweden) G Ulldahl | 11 | 12

Third Round
(Malaysia) A Abdul Latif | 15 | 19
13 | (Japan) T Ueda | 21 | 21

=== Bottom half ===
==== Section 5 ====
First Round
(Chinese Taipei) Yang C-h | 11 | 16
(Germany) M Reuter | 21 | 21
(Chinese Taipei) Wang T-w | 19 | 13
9 | (Malaysia) Chong WF | 21 | 21
PFR | (Switzerland) C Heiniger | 6 | 10
(Germany) D Domke | 21 | 21
(Chinese Taipei) Hsueh H-y | 7 | 19
5 | (India) K Parupalli | 21 | 21

Second Round
(Germany) M Reuter | 14 | 17
9 | (Malaysia) Chong WF | 21 | 21
(Germany) D Domke | 21 | 20 | 13
5 | (India) K Parupalli | 15 | 22 | 21

Third Round
9 | (Malaysia) Chong WF | 18 | 21 | 21
5 | (India) K Parupalli | 21 | 7 | 16

==== Section 6 ====
First Round
(England) R Ouseph | 21 | 21
(Switzerland) Y Hogianto | 19 | 15
(Indonesia) A Tedjono | 11 | 21 | 11
10 | (Hong Kong) Wong WK | 21 | 17 | 21
(Malaysia) Z Zulkiffli | 21 | 21
(Switzerland) A Dumartheray | 11 | 7
(India) S Kidambi | 21 | 17 | 13
4 | (Denmark) J Jorgensen | 10 | 21 | 21

Second Round
(England) R Ouseph | 21 | 15 | 12
10 | (Hong Kong) Wong WK | 19 | 21 | 21
(Malaysia) Z Zulkiffli | 15 | 11
4 | (Denmark) J Jorgensen | 21 | 21

Third Round
10 | (Hong Kong) Wong WK | 12 | 11
4 | (Denmark) J Jorgensen | 21 | 21

==== Section 7 ====
First Round
(China) Chen YK | 21 | 21
(Malaysia) Tan CS | 17 | 14
(Republic of Ireland) S Evans | 16 | 16
15 | (Chinese Taipei) Chou T-c | 21 | 21
(Austria) M Lahnsteiner | 21 | 9 | 12
(India) P Kumar | 18 | 21 | 21
(Bulgaria) S Makarski | 13 | 15
7 | (Thailand) B Ponsana | 21 | 21

Second Round
(China) Chen YK | 21 | 18 | 20
15 | (Chinese Taipei) Chou T-c | 18 | 21 | 22
(India) P Kumar | 18 | 21 | 21
7 | (Thailand) B Ponsana | 21 | 13 | 12

Third Round
15 | (Chinese Taipei) Chou T-c | 21 | 15 | 21
(India) P Kumar | 16 | 21 | 15

==== Section 8 ====
First Round
(Guatemala) K Cordon | 7 | 9
(France) B Leverdez | 21 | 21
(Slovenia) L Petric | 12 | 15
11 | (China) Wang ZM | 21 | 21
(Israel) M Zilberman | 16 | 16
(Japan) K Sakai | 21 | 21
(Germany) M Heumann | 18 | 12
PFR | (Switzerland) H Shaharudin | 21 | 21

Second Round
(France) B Leverdez | 12 | 11
11 | (China) Wang ZM | 21 | 21
(Japan) K Sakai | 21 | 21
PFR | (Switzerland) H Shaharudin | 10 | 5

Third Round
11 | (China) Wang ZM | 21 | 21
(Japan) K Sakai | 17 | 11

== Women's singles ==
=== Seeds ===
1. (India) Saina Nehwal (semi-final)
2. (Germany) Juliane Schenk (quarter-final)
3. (South Korea) Sung Ji-hyun (first round)
4. (China) Wang Shixian (champion)
5. (Thailand) Ratchanok Inthanon (final)
6. (Chinese Taipei) Tai Tzu-ying (quarter-final)
7. (China) Jiang Yanjiao (quarter-final)
8. (South Korea) Bae Youn-joo (quarter-final)

=== Finals ===
Semifinals
1 | (India) Saina Nehwal | 11 | 21 | 9
4 | (China) Wang Shixian | 21 | 10 | 21
Q3 | (Japan) Yui Hashimoto | 21 | 10 | 13
5 | (Thailand) Ratchanok Inthanon | 19 | 21 | 21

Final
4 | (China) Wang Shixian | 21 | 21
5 | (Thailand) Ratchanok Inthanon | 16 | 12

=== Top half ===
==== Section 1 ====
First Round
1 | (India) S Nehwal | 13 | 21 | 21
(France) S Vignes Waran | 21 | 15 | 12
(Switzerland) S Jaquet | 21 | 13 | 16
(Bulgaria) P Nedelcheva | 18 | 21 | 21
6 | (Chinese Taipei) Tai T-y | 17 | 21 | 21
(Indonesia) M Kusumastuti | 21 | 14 | 12
(Indonesia) H Desi | 16 | 21 | 19
Q2 | (Japan) S Uchida | 21 | 11 | 21

Second Round
1 | (India) S Nehwal | 21 | 21
(Bulgaria) P Nedelcheva | 15 | 10
6 | (Chinese Taipei) Tai T-y | 18 | 21 | 22
Q2 | (Japan) S Uchida | 21 | 16 | 20

Quarterfinals
1 | (India) S Nehwal | 21 | 21
6 | (Chinese Taipei) Tai T-y | 11 | 12

==== Section 2 ====
First Round
4 | (China) Wang SX | 21 | 21
(Republic of Ireland) C Magee | 16 | 4
(Germany) K Schnaase | 10 | 21 | 19
(Thailand) B Ongbumrungpan | 21 | 18 | 21
8 | (South Korea) Bae Y-j | 21 | 21
Q1 | (Netherlands) P Stolzenbach | 11 | 12
(Malaysia) Tee JY | 17 | 17
(Hong Kong) Chan TK | 21 | 21

Second Round
4 | (China) Wang SX | 21 | 21
(Thailand) B Ongbumrungpan | 16 | 18
8 | (South Korea) Bae Y-j | 16 | 21 | 23
(Hong Kong) Chan TK | 21 | 13 | 21

Quarterfinals
4 | (China) Wang SX | 21 | 21
8 | (South Korea) Bae Y-j | 7 | 12

=== Bottom half ===
==== Section 3 ====
First Round
(Japan) S Takahashi | 18 | 21 | 22
Q4 | (China) Sun Y | 21 | 14 | 20
(Indonesia) A Firdasari | 13 | 9
7 | (China) Jiang YJ | 21 | 21
PFQ | (Austria) S Prutsch | 12 | 11
Q3 | (Japan) Y Hashimoto | 21 | 21
(India) P Sindhu | 7
3 | (South Korea) Sung J-h | 2^{r}

Second Round
(Japan) S Takahashi | 21 | 11 | 21
7 | (China) Jiang YJ | 16 | 21 | 23
Q3 | (Japan) Y Hashimoto | 23 | 21
(India) P Sindhu | 21 | 11

Quarterfinals
7 | (China) Jiang YJ | 12 | 21 | 23
Q3 | (Japan) Y Hashimoto | 21 | 17 | 25

==== Section 4 ====
First Round
(Switzerland) N Schaller | 7 | 10
(Chinese Taipei) Pai H-m | 21 | 21
PFQ | (Japan) K Ito | 10 | 21 | 9
5 | (Thailand) R Inthanon | 21 | 10 | 21
(Malaysia) L Cheah | 25 | 21
(Canada) N Grether | 23 | 9
(Denmark) K Jorgensen | 9 | 18
2 | (Germany) J Schenk | 21 | 21

Second Round
(Chinese Taipei) Pai H-m | 14 | 16
5 | (Thailand) R Inthanon | 21 | 21
(Malaysia) L Cheah | 13 | 21 | 13
2 | (Germany) J Schenk | 21 | 13 | 21

Quarterfinals
5 | (Thailand) R Inthanon | 21 | 21
2 | (Germany) J Schenk | 10 | 10

== Men's doubles ==
=== Seeds ===
1. (South Korea) Ko Sung-hyun / Lee Yong-dae (final)
2. (South Korea) Kim Ki-jung / Kim Sa-rang (quarter-final)
3. (Malaysia) Hoon Thien How / Tan Wee Kiong (quarter-final)
4. (Indonesia) Angga Pratama / Rian Agung Saputro (second round)
5. (Indonesia) Mohammad Ahsan / Hendra Setiawan (second round)
6. (China) Chai Biao / Hong Wei (champion)
7. (Germany) Ingo Kindervater / Johannes Schoettler (first round)
8. (Malaysia) Goh V Shem / Lim Khim Wah (quarter-final)

=== Finals ===
Semifinals
1 | (South Korea) Ko Sung-hyun (South Korea) Lee Yong-dae | 21 | 21
(England) Chris Adcock (England) Andrew Ellis | 19 | 19
6 | (China) Chai Biao (China) Hong Wei | 17 | 21 | 22
(Indonesia) Alvent Yulianto (Indonesia) Markis Kido | 21 | 9 | 20

Final
1 | (South Korea) Ko Sung-hyun (South Korea) Lee Yong-dae | 14 | 21 | 14
6 | (China) Chai Biao (China) Hong Wei | 21 | 18 | 21

=== Top half ===
==== Section 1 ====
First Round
1 | (South Korea) Ko S-h (South Korea) Lee Y-d | 21 | 21
Q4 | (Russia) E Dremin (Russia) S Lunev | 10 | 14
(India) P Chopra (India) A Dewalkar | 12 | 21 | 21
(Thailand) B Issara (Thailand) S Prapakamol | 21 | 17 | 15
8 | (Malaysia) Goh VS (Malaysia) Lim KW | 13 | 21 | 21
(South Korea) Kang J-w (South Korea) Lee S-j | 21 | 14 | 17
WC | (Switzerland) F Schmid (Switzerland) G Tripet | 11 | 17
(Japan) H Saeki (Japan) R Taohata | 21 | 21

Second Round
1 | (South Korea) Ko S-h (South Korea) Lee Y-d | 21 | 21
(India) P Chopra (India) A Dewalkar | 14 | 12
8 | (Malaysia) Goh VS (Malaysia) Lim KW | 21 | 21
(Japan) H Saeki (Japan) R Taohata | 13 | 17

Quarterfinals
1 | (South Korea) Ko S-h (South Korea) Lee Y-d | 21 | 21
8 | (Malaysia) Goh VS (Malaysia) Lim KW | 7 | 19

==== Section 2 ====
First Round
4 | (Indonesia) A Pratama (Indonesia) R Saputro | 21 | 21
(France) R Labar (France) M Quere | 14 | 12
(Netherlands) R Bosch (Netherlands) K Ridder | 10 | 20
(Chinese Taipei) Lee S-m (Chinese Taipei) Tsai C-h | 21 | 22
7 | (Germany) I Kindervater (Germany) J Schoettler | 19 | 21 | 17
(Malaysia) Z Abdul Latif (Malaysia) F Tazari | 21 | 12 | 21
(Netherlands) J de Ruiter (Netherlands) D Khodabux | 7 | 20
(England) C Adcock (England) A Ellis | 21 | 22

Second Round
4 | (Indonesia) A Pratama (Indonesia) R Saputro | 17 | 15
(Chinese Taipei) Lee S-m (Chinese Taipei) Tsai C-h | 21 | 21
(Malaysia) Z Abdul Latif (Malaysia) F Tazari | 18 | 17
(England) C Adcock (England) A Ellis | 21 | 21

Quarterfinals
(Chinese Taipei) Lee S-m (Chinese Taipei) Tsai C-h | 15 | 9
(England) C Adcock (England) A Ellis | 21 | 21

=== Bottom half ===
==== Section 3 ====
First Round
(Indonesia) Y Suryatama (Indonesia) H Gunawan | 21 | 21
Q1 | (France) B Careme (France) G Mittelheisser | 17 | 19
(Germany) M Fuchs (Austria) J Koch | 20 | 18
6 | (China) Chai B (China) Hong W | 21 | 21
Q3 | (Switzerland) C Bösiger (Bulgaria) S Makarski | 22 | 18 | 17
(Netherlands) J Arends (Netherlands) J Maas | 20 | 21 | 21
Q2 | (Scotland) R Blair (Malaysia) Tan BS | 19 | 17
3 | (Malaysia) Hoon TH (Malaysia) Tan WK | 21 | 21

Second Round
(Indonesia) Y Suryatama (Indonesia) H Gunawan | 15 | 18
6 | (China) Chai B (China) Hong W | 21 | 21
(Netherlands) J Arends (Netherlands) J Maas | 15 | 9
3 | (Malaysia) Hoon TH (Malaysia) Tan WK | 21 | 21

Quarterfinals
6 | (China) Chai B (China) Hong W | 21 | 22
3 | (Malaysia) Hoon TH (Malaysia) Tan WK | 15 | 20

==== Section 4 ====
First Round
(Denmark) R Bonde (Denmark) M Conrad-Petersen | 18 | 19
(Indonesia) A Yulianto (Indonesia) M Kido | 21 | 21
(Chinese Taipei) Chen H-l (Chinese Taipei) Lu C-b | 21 | 15 | 18
5 | (Indonesia) M Ahsan (Indonesia) H Setiawan | 13 | 21 | 21
(Malaysia) Gan TC (Malaysia) Ong SH | 16 | 21 | 24
(England) C Langridge (England) P Mills | 21 | 14 | 22
(England) M Ellis (Scotland) P Van Rietvelde | 12 | 15
2 | (South Korea) Kim K-j (South Korea) Kim S-r | 21 | 21

Second Round
(Indonesia) A Yulianto (Indonesia) M Kido | 21 | 14 | 21
5 | (Indonesia) M Ahsan (Indonesia) H Setiawan | 19 | 21 | 14
(Malaysia) Gan TC (Malaysia) Ong SH | 17 | 19
2 | (South Korea) Kim K-j (South Korea) Kim S-r | 21 | 21

Quarterfinals
(Indonesia) A Yulianto (Indonesia) M Kido | 25 | 21 | 21
2 | (South Korea) Kim K-j (South Korea) Kim S-r | 27 | 9 | 13

== Women's doubles ==
=== Seeds ===
1. (Denmark) Christinna Pedersen / Kamilla Rytter Juhl (semi-final)
2. (South Korea) Eom Hye-won / Jang Ye-na (quarter-final)
3. (South Korea) Jung Kyung-eun / Kim Ha-na (champion)
4. (Thailand) Duanganong Aroonkesorn / Kunchala Voravichitchaikul (quarter-final)
5. (China) Bao Yixin / Wang Xiaoli (first round)
6. (Indonesia) Pia Zebadiah / Rizki Amelia Pradipta (quarter-final)
7. (Indonesia) Anneke Feinya Agustin / Nitya Krishinda Maheswari (first round)
8. (South Korea) Choi Hye-in / Kim So-young (quarter-final)

=== Finals ===
Semifinals
1 | (Denmark) Christinna Pedersen (Denmark) Kamilla Rytter Juhl | 19 | 17
3 | (South Korea) Jung Kyung-eun (South Korea) Kim Ha-na | 21 | 21
(Malaysia) Vivian Hoo Kah Mun (Malaysia) Woon Khe Wei | 17 | 19
(South Korea) Lee So-hee (South Korea) Shin Seung-chan | 21 | 21

Final
3 | (South Korea) Jung Kyung-eun (South Korea) Kim Ha-na | 23 | 21
(South Korea) Lee So-hee (South Korea) Shin Seung-chan | 21 | 16

=== Top half ===
==== Section 1 ====
First Round
1 | (Denmark) C Pedersen (Denmark) K Juhl | 21 | 21
(Japan) Y Fukushima (Japan) R Kakiiwa | 11 | 10
(Malaysia) Ng HE (Malaysia) Ng HL | 21 | 21
(Canada) N Grether (Canada) C Reid | 8 | 13
6 | (Indonesia) P Zebadiah (Indonesia) R Pradipta | 21 | 21
(England) L Smith (England) G White | 16 | 10
(Thailand) A Serithammarak (Thailand) P Mungkitamorn | 21 | 21
Q2 | (Switzerland) C Burkart (Switzerland) S Von Rotz | 7 | 6

Second Round
1 | (Denmark) C Pedersen (Denmark) K Juhl | 21 | 21
(Malaysia) Ng HE (Malaysia) Ng HL | 13 | 18
6 | (Indonesia) P Zebadiah (Indonesia) R Pradipta | 21 | 17 | 21
(Thailand) A Serithammarak (Thailand) P Mungkitamorn | 13 | 21 | 19

Quarterfinals
1 | (Denmark) C Pedersen (Denmark) K Juhl | 21 | 21
6 | (Indonesia) P Zebadiah (Indonesia) R Pradipta | 19 | 15

==== Section 2 ====
First Round
3 | (South Korea) Jung K-e (South Korea) Kim H-n | 21 | 21
(Indonesia) S Andini (Indonesia) D Haris | 7 | 18
Q1 | (Chinese Taipei) Cheng W-h (Chinese Taipei) Hsieh P-c | 21 | 17 | 19
(Netherlands) S Barning (Netherlands) E Muskens | 18 | 21 | 21
8 | (South Korea) Choi H-i (South Korea) Kim S-y | 21 | 21
(Bulgaria) P Nedelcheva (Bulgaria) D Popstoikova | 14 | 14
(Sweden) E Lennartsson (Sweden) E Wengberg | 24 | 21
(Germany) I Herttrich (Germany) C Nelte | 22 | 10

Second Round
3 | (South Korea) Jung K-e (South Korea) Kim H-n | 21 | 21
(Netherlands) S Barning (Netherlands) E Muskens | 11 | 4
8 | (South Korea) Choi H-i (South Korea) Kim S-y | 21 | 21
(Sweden) E Lennartsson (Sweden) E Wengberg | 11 | 13

Quarterfinals
3 | (South Korea) Jung K-e (South Korea) Kim H-n | 21 | 21
8 | (South Korea) Choi H-i (South Korea) Kim S-y | 17 | 17

=== Bottom half ===
==== Section 3 ====
First Round
Q4 | (Switzerland) S Herzig (Switzerland) T Pelling | 14 | 11
(Netherlands) S Piek (Netherlands) I Tabeling | 21 | 21
(Malaysia) V Hoo (Malaysia) Woon KW | 21 | 20 | 21
7 | (Indonesia) A Agustin (Indonesia) N Maheswari | 15 | 22 | 7
(Bulgaria) G Stoeva (Bulgaria) S Stoeva | 20 | 15
(Germany) J Goliszewski (Germany) B Michels | 22 | 21
Q3 | (Japan) M Aratama (Japan) M Taruno | 15 | 14
4 | (Thailand) D Aroonkesorn (Thailand) K Voravichitchaikul | 21 | 21

Second Round
(Netherlands) S Piek (Netherlands) I Tabeling | 7 | 21 | 10
(Malaysia) V Hoo (Malaysia) Woon KW | 21 | 14 | 21
(Germany) J Goliszewski (Germany) B Michels | 21 | 8 | 20
4 | (Thailand) D Aroonkesorn (Thailand) K Voravichitchaikul | 15 | 21 | 22

Quarterfinals
(Malaysia) V Hoo (Malaysia) Woon KW | 21 | 21
4 | (Thailand) D Aroonkesorn (Thailand) K Voravichitchaikul | 16 | 19

==== Section 4 ====
First Round
(South Korea) Lee S-h (South Korea) Shin S-c | 20 | 21 | 21
(Macau) Wang R (Macau) Zhang ZB | 22 | 14 | 15
(Indonesia) M Jauhari (Indonesia) L Natsir
5 | (China) Bao YX (China) Wang XL | wo
(France) A Fontaine (France) E Lefel | 6 | 11
(England) H Olver (England) K Robertshaw | 21 | 21
(France) T Waran (Germany) C Vogelgsang | 11 | 11
2 | (South Korea) Eom H-w (South Korea) Jang Y-n | 21 | 21

Second Round
(South Korea) Lee S-h (South Korea) Shin S-c | 21 | 24
(Indonesia) M Jauhari (Indonesia) L Natsir | 15 | 22
(England) H Olver (England) K Robertshaw | 22 | 16
2 | (South Korea) Eom H-w (South Korea) Jang Y-n | 24 | 21

Quarterfinals
(South Korea) Lee S-h (South Korea) Shin S-c | 23 | 21
2 | (South Korea) Eom H-w (South Korea) Jang Y-n | 21 | 17

== Mixed doubles ==
=== Seeds ===
1. (Indonesia) Tontowi Ahmad / Lilyana Natsir (semi-final)
2. (Denmark) Joachim Fischer Nielsen / Christinna Pedersen (champion)
3. (Indonesia) Muhammad Rijal / Debby Susanto (quarter-final)
4. (Singapore) Danny Bawa Chrisnanta / Vanessa Neo Yu Yan (second round)
5. (Indonesia) Markis Kido / Pia Zebadiah (quarter-final)
6. (Germany) Michael Fuchs / Birgit Michels (semi-final)
7. (Thailand) Sudket Prapakamol / Kunchala Voravichitchaikul (second round)
8. (Denmark) Mads Pieler Kolding / Kamilla Rytter Juhl (second round)

=== Finals ===
Semifinals
1 | (Indonesia) Tontowi Ahmad (Indonesia) Lilyana Natsir | 17 | 21 | 10
Q3 | (China) Zhang Nan (China) Tang Jinhua | 21 | 19 | 21
6 | (Germany) Michael Fuchs (Germany) Birgit Michels | 9 | 9
2 | (Denmark) Joachim Fischer Nielsen (Denmark) Christinna Pedersen | 21 | 21

Final
Q3 | (China) Zhang Nan (China) Tang Jinhua | 20 | 19
2 | (Denmark) Joachim Fischer Nielsen (Denmark) Christinna Pedersen | 22 | 21

=== Top half ===
==== Section 1 ====
First Round
1 | (Indonesia) T Ahmad (Indonesia) L Natsir | 21 | 21
(Germany) P Kaesbauer (Germany) I Herttrich | 12 | 17
(Chinese Taipei) Lu C-b (Chinese Taipei) Chang Y-l | 15 | 11
(Netherlands) J de Ruiter (Netherlands) S Barning | 21 | 21
8 | (Denmark) M Kolding (Denmark) K Juhl | 21 | 21
(Sweden) N Ruponen (Sweden) A Hogstrom | 13 | 17
(South Korea) Shin B-c (South Korea) Jang Y-n | 21 | 21
(France) B Careme (France) A Fontaine | 14 | 17

Second Round
1 | (Indonesia) T Ahmad (Indonesia) L Natsir | 21 | 21
(Netherlands) J de Ruiter (Netherlands) S Barning | 10 | 12
8 | (Denmark) M Kolding (Denmark) K Juhl | 14 | 12
(South Korea) Shin B-c (South Korea) Jang Y-n | 21 | 21

Quarterfinals
1 | (Indonesia) T Ahmad (Indonesia) L Natsir | 21 | 21
(South Korea) Shin B-c (South Korea) Jang Y-n | 15 | 13

==== Section 2 ====
First Round
4 | (Singapore) D Chrisnanta (Singapore) V Neo | 24 | 21
(Germany) M Schwenger (Germany) C Nelte | 22 | 11
Q3 | (China) Zhang N (China) Tang JH | 21 | 21
Q2 | (Malaysia) Gan TC (Malaysia) Ng HL | 17 | 10
5 | (Indonesia) M Kido (Indonesia) P Zebadiah | 21 | 12 | 21
(England) C Adcock (England) G White | 11 | 21 | 17
(Russia) S Lunev (Russia) E Dimova | 21 | 13 | 15
Q4 | (Netherlands) R Bosch (Netherlands) S Piek | 17 | 21 | 21

Second Round
4 | (Singapore) D Chrisnanta (Singapore) V Neo | 18 | 10
Q3 | (China) Zhang N (China) Tang JH | 21 | 21
5 | (Indonesia) M Kido (Indonesia) P Zebadiah | 21 | 21
Q4 | (Netherlands) R Bosch (Netherlands) S Piek | 15 | 17

Quarterfinals
Q3 | (China) Zhang N (China) Tang JH | 21 | 19 | 21
5 | (Indonesia) M Kido (Indonesia) P Zebadiah | 19 | 21 | 14

=== Bottom half ===
==== Section 3 ====
First Round
(Indonesia) V Okvana (Indonesia) G Megawati | 13 | 13
(France) R Labar (France) L Choinet | 21 | 21
(South Korea) Kim K-j (South Korea) Jung K-e | 19 | 12
6 | (Germany) M Fuchs (Germany) B Michels | 21 | 21
(Switzerland) A Dumartheray (Switzerland) S Jaquet | 19 | 11
(South Korea) Lee S-j (South Korea) Kim S-y | 21 | 21
(Denmark) A Kristiansen (Denmark) J Houmann | 20 | 19
3 | (Indonesia) M Rijal (Indonesia) D Susanto | 22 | 21

Second Round
(France) R Labar (France) L Choinet | 9 | 10
6 | (Germany) M Fuchs (Germany) B Michels | 21 | 21
(South Korea) Lee S-j (South Korea) Kim S-y | 11 | 13
3 | (Indonesia) M Rijal (Indonesia) D Susanto | 21 | 21

Quarterfinals
6 | (Germany) M Fuchs (Germany) B Michels | 17 | 21 | 21
3 | (Indonesia) M Rijal (Indonesia) D Susanto | 21 | 19 | 15

==== Section 4 ====
First Round
(Republic of Ireland) S Magee (Republic of Ireland) C Magee | 19 | 15
(England) C Langridge (England) H Olver | 21 | 21
Q1 | (Indonesia) A Yulianto (Indonesia) R Pradipta | 17 | 22 | 17
7 | (Thailand) S Prapakamol (Thailand) K Voravichitchaikul | 21 | 20 | 21
(France) G Mittelheisser (France) E Lefel | 21 | 17 | 15
(Netherlands) J Arends (Netherlands) I Vaessen | 19 | 21 | 21
(Chinese Taipei) Chen H-l (Chinese Taipei) Pai H-m | 7 | 12
2 | (Denmark) J Nielsen (Denmark) C Pedersen | 21 | 21

Second Round
(England) C Langridge (England) H Olver | 21 | 16 | 21
7 | (Thailand) S Prapakamol (Thailand) K Voravichitchaikul | 12 | 21 | 18
(Netherlands) J Arends (Netherlands) I Vaessen | 12 | 8
2 | (Denmark) J Nielsen (Denmark) C Pedersen | 21 | 21

Quarterfinals
(England) C Langridge (England) H Olver | 8 | 17
2 | (Denmark) J Nielsen (Denmark) C Pedersen | 21 | 21

| Preceded by 2013 German Open Grand Prix Gold | BWF Grand Prix Gold and Grand Prix; 2013 season | Succeeded by 2013 Australia Open Grand Prix Gold |
