= Rian Agung Saputro =

Indonesian badminton player (born 1990)

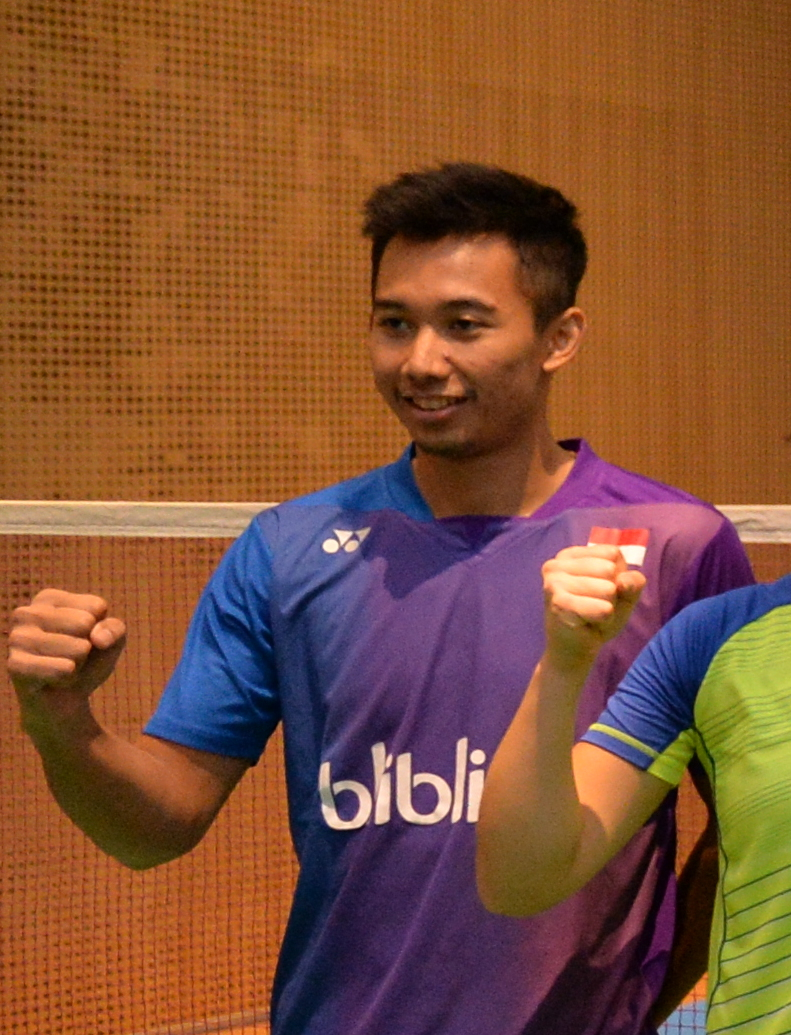
- Saputro in 2016

Personal information
- Born: 25 June 1990 (age 36) Karanganyar, Central Java, Indonesia
- Height: 1.80 m (5 ft 11 in)
- Weight: 73 kg (161 lb)

Sport
- Country: Indonesia
- Sport: Badminton
- Handedness: Right
- Coached by: Aryono Miranat; Herry Iman Pierngadi

Men's & mixed doubles
- Highest ranking: 7 (MD with Angga Pratama 3 April 2014, 13 (with Mohammad Ahsan 23 November 2017)
- BWF profile
Medal record
Men's badminton
Representing Indonesia
World Championships
Silver medal – second place	2017 Glasgow	Men's doubles
Thomas Cup
Bronze medal – third place	2014 New Delhi	Men's team
Asia Team Championships
Gold medal – first place	2016 Hyderabad	Men's team
Gold medal – first place	2018 Alor Setar	Men's team
Summer Universiade
Gold medal – first place	2011 Shenzhen	Mixed team
SEA Games
Gold medal – first place	2013 Naypyidaw	Men's doubles

Rian Agung Saputro (born 25 June 1990) is an Indonesian badminton player. He was partnered with Angga Pratama in men's doubles, but split after the 2014 Asian Games. Saputro was then partnered with Berry Angriawan. They debuted at the 2014 Hong Kong Super Series. They won their first Grand Prix Gold title at the 2015 Indonesian Masters. In 2016, he was paired with former Olympic gold medalist, Hendra Setiawan. Saputro was then paired with Setiawan's former partner, Mohammad Ahsan. Ahsan and Saputro's first international title was in China International. They later won silver at the 2017 BWF World Championships.

== Career ==
=== 2023 ===
In September, Saputro and his partner Berry Angriawan won the Indonesia International tournament in Medan, defeating 1st seed and fellow Indonesian pair Sabar Karyaman Gutama and Muhammad Reza Pahlevi Isfahani in rubber games.

== Achievements ==
=== BWF World Championships ===
Men's doubles
Year	Venue	Partner	Opponent	Score	Result	Ref.
2017	Emirates Arena; Glasgow, Scotland	(Indonesia) Mohammad Ahsan	(China) Liu Cheng (China) Zhang Nan	10–21, 17–21	Silver	

=== SEA Games ===
Men's doubles
Year	Venue	Partner	Opponent	Score	Result	Ref.
2013	Wunna Theikdi Indoor Stadium; Naypyidaw, Myanmar	(Indonesia) Angga Pratama	(Indonesia) Berry Angriawan (Indonesia) Ricky Karanda Suwardi	21–13, 17–21, 21–11	Gold	

=== BWF Superseries (1 runner-up) ===
The BWF Superseries, which was launched on 14 December 2006 and implemented in 2007, was a series of elite badminton tournaments, sanctioned by the Badminton World Federation (BWF). BWF Superseries levels were Superseries and Superseries Premier. A season of Superseries consisted of twelve tournaments around the world that had been introduced since 2011. Successful players were invited to the Superseries Finals, which were held at the end of each year.

Men's doubles
Year	Tournament	Partner	Opponent	Score	Result	Ref.
2011	India Open	(Indonesia) Angga Pratama	(Japan) Hirokatsu Hashimoto (Japan) Noriyasu Hirata	17–21, 9–21	(silver) Runner-up	

BWF Super Series Finals tournament
BWF Super Series Premier tournament
BWF Super Series tournament

=== BWF Grand Prix (6 titles, 3 runners-up) ===
The BWF Grand Prix had two levels, the Grand Prix and Grand Prix Gold. It was a series of badminton tournaments sanctioned by the Badminton World Federation (BWF) and played between 2007 and 2017.

Men's doubles
Year	Tournament	Partner	Opponent	Score	Result	Ref.
2011	Vietnam Open	(Indonesia) Angga Pratama	(Singapore) Danny Bawa Chrisnanta (Singapore) Chayut Triyachart	21–12, 16–21, 21–19	(gold) Winner	
2012	Indonesia Grand Prix Gold	(Indonesia) Angga Pratama	(South Korea) Kim Gi-jung (South Korea) Kim Sa-rang	13–21, 9–21	(silver) Runner-up	
2012	Chinese Taipei Open	(Indonesia) Angga Pratama	(Malaysia) Mohd Zakry Abdul Latif (Malaysia) Mohd Fairuzizuan Mohd Tazari	12–21, 14–21	(silver) Runner-up	
2013	Australia Open	(Indonesia) Angga Pratama	(Indonesia) Mohammad Ahsan (Indonesia) Hendra Setiawan	22–20, 21–19	(gold) Winner	
2013	New Zealand Open	(Indonesia) Angga Pratama	(China) Li Junhui (China) Liu Yuchen	21–6, 22–20	(gold) Winner	
2013	Indonesia Grand Prix Gold	(Indonesia) Angga Pratama	(Indonesia) Ronald Alexander (Indonesia) Selvanus Geh	17–21, 21–15, 21–16	(gold) Winner	
2015	Macau Open	(Indonesia) Berry Angriawan	(South Korea) Ko Sung-hyun (South Korea) Shin Baek-cheol	20–22, 14–21	(silver) Runner-up	
2015	Indonesia Masters	(Indonesia) Berry Angriawan	(China) Chai Biao (China) Hong Wei	21–11, 22–20	(gold) Winner	
2016	Thailand Open	(Indonesia) Berry Angriawan	(Japan) Takuto Inoue (Japan) Yuki Kaneko	17–21, 21–14, 21–18	(gold) Winner	

BWF Grand Prix Gold tournament
BWF Grand Prix tournament

=== BWF International Challenge/Series (5 titles, 3 runners-up) ===
Men's doubles
Year	Tournament	Partner	Opponent	Score	Result	Ref.
2009	Indonesia International	(Indonesia) Angga Pratama	(Indonesia) Hendra Aprida Gunawan (Indonesia) Alvent Yulianto	17–21, 12–21	(silver) Runner-up	
2015	Indonesia International	(Indonesia) Berry Angriawan	(South Korea) Jun Bong-chan (South Korea) Kim Dae-eun	12–21, 21–19, 21–15	(gold) Winner	
2017	China International	(Indonesia) Mohammad Ahsan	(Thailand) Trawut Potieng (Thailand) Nanthakarn Yordphaisong	8–11, 11–7, 11–4, 11–7	(gold) Winner	
2019	Vietnam International	(Indonesia) Kenas Adi Haryanto	(South Korea) Kang Min-hyuk (South Korea) Kim Jae-hwan	21–19, 15–21, 21–18	(gold) Winner	
2022 (I)	Indonesia International	(Indonesia) Berry Angriawan	(Japan) Takumi Nomura (Japan) Yuichi Shimogami	16–21, 15–21	(silver) Runner-up	
2023 (I)	Indonesia International	(Indonesia) Berry Angriawan	(Indonesia) Sabar Karyaman Gutama (Indonesia) Muhammad Reza Pahlevi Isfahani	19–21, 21–19, 21–17	(gold) Winner	

Mixed doubles
Year	Tournament	Partner	Opponent	Score	Result	Ref.
2019	Indonesia International	(Indonesia) Tiara Rosalia Nuraidah	(Indonesia) Zachariah Josiahno Sumanti (Indonesia) Hediana Julimarbela	20–22, 14–21	(silver) Runner-up	
2023	Canadian International	(Indonesia) Serena Kani	(United States) Presley Smith (United States) Allison Lee	12–21, 21–8, 21–16	(gold) Winner	

BWF International Challenge tournament
BWF International Series tournament

== Performance timeline ==
Key

W	Won	F	Finalist	SF	Semi-finalist
QF	Quarter-finalist	#R	Rounds 4, 3, 2, 1	RR	Round-robin stage
Q#	Qualification round	A	Absent	w/d	Withdrew
G	Gold	S	Silver	B	Bronze
NH	Not held	N/A	Not applicable	DNQ	Did not qualify

=== National team ===
- Senior level

Team events	2016	2018
Asia Team Championships	G	G

Team events	2011
Universiade	G

Team events	2014
Thomas Cup	B

=== Individual competitions ===
==== Men's doubles ====
- Senior level

Event	2013	Ref
SEA Games	G	

Event	2012	2013	2014	2015	2016	2017	2018	Ref
Asia Championships	2R	A			1R	2R	2R	
Asian Games	NH		QF	NH			DNQ	
World Championships	DNQ	QF	QF	DNQ	NH	S	DNQ	

Tournament	BWF Superseries / Grand Prix								BWF World Tour								Best	Ref
Tournament	2010	2011	2012	2013	2014	2015	2016	2017	2018	2019	2020	2021	2022	2023	2024	2025	Best	Ref
Malaysia Open	A	1R	2R	2R	SF	A	2R	2R	A		NH		A				SF ('14)	
India Open	A	F	SF	SF	2R	A			QF	A	NH		A				F ('11)	
Indonesia Masters	2R	1R	F	W	A	W	QF	NH	2R	A			Q2	A			W ('13, '15)	
German Open	A				w/d	QF	A		2R	A	NH		A				QF ('15)	
Orléans Masters	NA								A		NH	A	Q2	A			Q2 ('22)	
All England Open	A		1R	1R	QF	A	1R	2R	1R	A							QF ('14)	
Swiss Open	A		2R	2R	A		1R	A			NH	A					2R ('12, '13)	
Chinese Taipei Open	A		F	A		1R	A		1R	A	NH		A				F ('12)	
Thailand Open	NH	A			NH	2R	W	A				NH	A				W ('16)	
Malaysia Masters	QF	1R	A				1R	2R	A			NH	A				QF ('10)	
Singapore Open	A		2R	1R	2R	A	2R	1R	SF	A	NH		A				SF ('18)	
Indonesia Open	A	QF	1R	1R	2R	2R	1R	1R	1R	A	NH	A					QF ('11)	
Canada Open	A										NH		A			1R	1R ('25)	
Japan Open	2R	1R	A	2R	SF	A					NH		A				SF ('14)	
China Open	A	2R	A	1R	A		1R	SF	A		NH			A			SF ('17)	
Macau Open	2R	2R	A		2R	F	A				NH			A			F ('15)	
Vietnam Open	A	W	A			2R	A	w/d	w/d	1R	NH			A			W ('11)	
Hong Kong Open	2R	A	2R	w/d	1R	A	SF	QF	A		NH			A			SF ('16)	
China Masters	A	1R	A								NH			A			1R ('11)	
Indonesia Masters Super 100	NA								SF	QF	NH		Q1	A		1R	SF ('18)	
Indonesia Masters Super 100	NA								SF	QF	NH		Q1	A			SF ('18)	
Korea Open	A		1R	A							NH		A				1R ('12)	
Denmark Open	A	1R	2R	1R	A		2R	1R	A								2R ('12, '16)	
French Open	A	QF	2R	1R	A		1R	2R	A		NH	A					QF ('11)	
Bitburger Open	QF	A															QF ('10)	
Korea Masters	A					2R	A				NH		A				2R ('15)	
Australian Open	A		SF	W	1R	A	SF	A			NH		A				W ('13)	
Syed Modi International	A			NH	A		1R	A			NH		A				1R ('16)	
Chinese Taipei Masters	NH					1R	A	NH									1R ('15)	
Hyderabad Open	NA								A	1R	NH						1R (2019)	
New Zealand Open	NH	A	NH	W	A	2R	A				NH						W ('13)	
Year-end Ranking	51	21	17	10	14	27	21	15	70	101	90	117	147	227	359		7	
Tournament	2010	2011	2012	2013	2014	2015	2016	2017	2018	2019	2020	2021	2022	2023	2024	2025	Best	

==== Mixed doubles ====
Tournament	BWF World Tour	Best
Tournament	2019	Best
Indonesia Masters Super 100	2R	2R ('19)
Vietnam Open	2R	2R ('19)
Year-end Ranking	201	184

== Record against selected opponents ==
Men's doubles results against World Superseries finalists, World Superseries Finals semifinalists, World Championships semifinalists, and Olympic quarterfinalists paired with:

Mohammad Ahsan

- (China) Chai Biao & Hong Wei 0–1
- (China) Li Junhui & Liu Yuchen 1–1
- (China) Liu Cheng & Zhang Nan 0–1
- (Denmark) Mathias Boe & Carsten Mogensen 0–1
- (Indonesia) Hendra Setiawan & (Malaysia) Tan Boon Heong 1–0
- (Indonesia) Ricky Karanda Suwardi & Angga Pratama 1–0
- (Japan) Takeshi Kamura & Keigo Sonoda 1–1
- (Malaysia) Goh V Shem & Tan Wee Kiong 1–0

Berry Angriawan

- (China) Chai Biao & Hong Wei 1–1
- (China) Fu Haifeng & Zhang Nan 0–1
- (China) Liu Xiaolong & Qiu Zihan 0–1
- (Indonesia) Marcus Fernaldi Gideon & Kevin Sanjaya Sukamuljo 1–0
- (Indonesia) Ricky Karanda Suwardi & Angga Pratama 0–2
- (Japan) Hirokatsu Hashimoto & Noriyasu Hirata 0–1
- (Japan) Takeshi Kamura & Keigo Sonoda 2–2
- (Japan) Hiroyuki Endo & Kenichi Hayakawa 0–2
- (South Korea) Kim Gi-jung & Kim Sa-rang 1–2
- (South Korea) Ko Sung-hyun & Shin Baek-cheol 0–1
- (South Korea) Lee Yong-dae & Yoo Yeon-seong 0–1
- (Malaysia) Koo Kien Keat & Tan Boon Heong 1–1

Angga Pratama

- (China) Cai Yun & Fu Haifeng 2–1
- (China) Chai Biao & Guo Zhendong 1–2
- (China) Chai Biao & Hong Wei 1–0
- (China) Hong Wei & Shen Ye 0–2
- (China) Liu Xiaolong & Qiu Zihan 3–1
- (Chinese Taipei) Lee Sheng-mu & Tsai Chia-hsin 0–2
- (Denmark) Jonas Rasmussen & Mads Conrad-Petersen 0–1
- (Denmark) Mads Pieler Kolding & Mads Conrad-Petersen 2–1
- (Denmark) Mathias Boe & Carsten Mogensen 0–3
- (Indonesia) Bona Septano & Mohammad Ahsan 1–2
- (Indonesia) Hendra Aprida Gunawan & Alvent Yulianto Chandra 1–1
- (Indonesia) Markis Kido & Hendra Setiawan 0–2
- (Indonesia) Mohammad Ahsan & Hendra Setiawan 1–1
- (Japan) Hirokatsu Hashimoto & Noriyasu Hirata 1–4
- (Japan) Hiroyuki Endo & Kenichi Hayakawa 2–4
- (Japan) Takeshi Kamura & Keigo Sonoda 0–1
- (South Korea) Cho Gun-woo & Kwon Yi-goo 0–2
- (South Korea) Jung Jae-sung & Lee Yong-dae 1–1
- (South Korea) Kim Gi-jung & Kim Sa-rang 0–4
- (South Korea) Ko Sung-hyun & Lee Yong-dae 0–1
- (South Korea) Ko Sung-hyun & Shin Baek-cheol 0–1
- (South Korea) Lee Yong-dae & Yoo Yeon-seong 1–2
- (Malaysia) Mohd Zakry Abdul Latif & Mohd Fairuzizuan Mohd Tazari 1–1
- (Malaysia) Koo Kien Keat & Tan Boon Heong 1–1
- (Malaysia) Hoon Thien How & Tan Wee Kiong 1–0
- (Thailand) Bodin Isara & Maneepong Jongjit 0–2
