= 2011 Vietnam Open Grand Prix =

2011 badminton tournament in Ho Chi Minh City

Tournament details
- Dates: 22–28 August
- Level: Grand Prix
- Total prize money: US$50,000
- Venue: Phan Dinh Phung Stadium
- Location: Ho Chi Minh City, Vietnam

Champions
- Men's singles: (Vietnam) Nguyễn Tiến Minh
- Women's singles: (Singapore) Fu Mingtian
- Men's doubles: (Indonesia) Angga Pratama (Indonesia) Rian Agung Saputro
- Women's doubles: (Indonesia) Anneke Feinya Agustin (Indonesia) Nitya Krishinda Maheswari
- Mixed doubles: (Russia) Vitalij Durkin (Russia) Nina Vislova

The 2011 Vietnam Open Grand Prix (officially known as the Yonex-Sunrise Vietnam Grand Prix Open 2011 for sponsorship reasons) was a badminton tournament which took place at Phan Dinh Phung Stadium in Ho Chi Minh City, Vietnam, from 22 to 28 August and had a total purse of $50,000.

== Tournament ==
The 2011 Vietnam Open Grand Prix was the ninth Grand Prix's badminton tournament of the 2011 BWF Grand Prix Gold and Grand Prix and also part of the Vietnam Open championships which have been held since 1996. This tournament was organized by the Vietnam Badminton Federation, with the local organizer committee Ho Chi Minh City Badminton Association, and sanctioned by the Badminton World Federation.

This tournament attracted more than 300 players from 23 countries and territories to compete in 5 events: men's singles, women's singles, men's doubles, women's doubles and mixed doubles.

=== Venue ===
This international tournament was held at the Phan Dinh Phung Stadium in District 1, Ho Chi Minh City, Vietnam.

=== Point distribution ===
Below is the point distribution for each phase of the tournament based on the BWF points system for the BWF Grand Prix event.

Winner	Runner-up	3/4	5/8	9/16	17/32	33/64	65/128	129/256	257/512
5,500	4,680	3,850	3,030	2,110	1,290	510	240	100	45

=== Prize money ===
The total prize money was US$50,000. Distribution of prize money was in accordance with BWF regulations.

Event	Winner	Finals	Semi-finals	Quarter-finals	Last 16
Singles	$3,750	$1,900	$725	$300	$175
Doubles	$3,950	$1,900	$700	$362.5	$187.5

== Men's singles ==
=== Seeds ===
1. (Vietnam) Nguyễn Tiến Minh (champion)
2. (Japan) Sho Sasaki (final)
3. (Indonesia) Tommy Sugiarto (withdrew)
4. (Indonesia) Alamsyah Yunus (quarter-finals)
5. (India) Ajay Jayaram (semi-finals)
6. (Hong Kong) Chan Yan Kit (first round)
7. (Chinese Taipei) Hsu Jen-hao (third round)
8. (Malaysia) Muhammad Hafiz Hashim (quarter-finals)
9. (Singapore) Derek Wong (first round)
10. (Singapore) Ashton Chen (third round)
11. (Malaysia) Liew Daren (quarter-finals)
12. (India) R. M. V. Gurusaidutt (semi-finals)
13. (Russia) Vladimir Malkov (second round)
14. (Japan) Keigo Sonoda (third round)
15. (Indonesia) Sony Dwi Kuncoro (third round)
16. (Thailand) Pakkawat Vilailak (second round)

=== Finals ===
Semi-finals
1	(Vietnam) Nguyễn Tiến Minh	21	21
12	(India) R. M. V. Gurusaidutt	5	9
5	(India) Ajay Jayaram	21	14	16
2	(Japan) Sho Sasaki	12	21	21

Final
1	(Vietnam) Nguyễn Tiến Minh	21	21
2	(Japan) Sho Sasaki	13	17

== Women's singles ==
=== Seeds ===
1. (Thailand) Ratchanok Intanon (withdrew)
2. (Japan) Sayaka Sato (second round)
3. (Chinese Taipei) Tai Tzu-ying (semi-finals)
4. (Japan) Ai Goto (first round)
5. (Singapore) Gu Juan (first round)
6. (Indonesia) Aprilia Yuswandari (second round)
7. (Bulgaria) Linda Zetchiri (first round)
8. (Indonesia) Maria Febe Kusumastuti (first round)

=== Finals ===
Semi-finals
PFQ	(South Korea) Hwang Hye-youn	19	15
(Singapore) Fu Mingtian	21	21
3	(Chinese Taipei) Tai Tzu-ying	15	18
(Japan) Kaori Imabeppu	21	21

Final
(Singapore) Fu Mingtian	21	16	21
(Japan) Kaori Imabeppu	18	21	8

== Men's doubles ==
=== Seeds ===
1. (Japan) Hirokatsu Hashimoto / Noriyasu Hirata (quarter-finals)
2. (Japan) Naoki Kawamae / Shōji Satō (quarter-finals)
3. (Chinese Taipei) Chen Hung-ling / Lin Yu-lang (quarter-finals)
4. (Malaysia) Gan Teik Chai / Tan Bin Shen (second round)
5. (Indonesia) Angga Pratama / Rian Agung Saputro (champions)
6. (Malaysia) Goh Wei Shem / Lim Khim Wah (semi-finals)
7. (Malaysia) Mak Hee Chun / Ong Soon Hock (semi-finals)
8. (Indonesia) Yohanes Rendy Sugiarto / Afiat Yuris Wirawan (quarter-finals)

=== Finals ===
Semi-finals
7	(Malaysia) Mak Hee Chun (Malaysia) Ong Soon Hock	21	19	12
(Singapore) Danny Bawa Chrisnanta (Singapore) Chayut Triyachart	16	21	21
6	(Malaysia) Goh Wei Shem (Malaysia) Lim Khim Wah	21	10	20
5	(Indonesia) Angga Pratama (Indonesia) Rian Agung Saputro	8	21	22

Final
(Singapore) Danny Bawa Chrisnanta (Singapore) Chayut Triyachart	12	21	19
5	(Indonesia) Angga Pratama (Indonesia) Rian Agung Saputro	21	16	21

== Women's doubles ==
=== Seeds ===
1. (Netherlands) Lotte Jonathans / Paulien van Dooremalen (second round)
2. (Singapore) Shinta Mulia Sari / Yao Lei (final)
3. (United States) Iris Wang / Rena Wang (second round)
4. (Australia) Leanne Choo / Renuga Veeran (first round)
5. (Indonesia) Anneke Feinya Agustin / Nitya Krishinda Maheswari (champions)
6. (Malaysia) Ng Hui Ern / Ng Hui Lin (first round)
7. (Chinese Taipei) Chiang Kai-hsin / Tsai Pei-ling (semi-finals)
8. (Indonesia) Suci Rizky Andini / Della Destiara Haris (withdrew)

=== Finals ===
Semi-finals
5	(Indonesia) Anneke Feinya Agustin (Indonesia) Nitya Krishinda Maheswari	21	21
7	(Chinese Taipei) Chiang Kai-hsin (Chinese Taipei) Tsai Pei-ling	11	7
(South Korea) Choi A-reum (South Korea) Yoo Hyun-young	20	17
2	(Singapore) Shinta Mulia Sari (Singapore) Yao Lei	22	21

Final
5	(Indonesia) Anneke Feinya Agustin (Indonesia) Nitya Krishinda Maheswari	23	26
2	(Singapore) Shinta Mulia Sari (Singapore) Yao Lei	21	24

== Mixed doubles ==
=== Seeds ===
1. (Singapore) Danny Bawa Chrisnanta / Vanessa Neo (semi-finals)
2. (Singapore) Chayut Triyachart / Yao Lei (second round)
3. (Russia) Vitalij Durkin / Nina Vislova (champions)
4. (India) Arun Vishnu / Aparna Balan (quarter-finals)
5. (Indonesia) Muhammad Rizky Delynugraha / Richi Puspita Dili (second round)
6. (Hong Kong) Leung Chun Yiu / Ng Ka Shun (first round)
7. (Indonesia) Irfan Fadhilah / Weni Anggraini (quarter-finals)
8. (Malaysia) Tan Aik Quan / Lai Pei Jing (semi-finals)

=== Finals ===
Semi-finals
1	(Singapore) Danny Bawa Chrisnanta (Singapore) Vanessa Neo	14	17
3	(Russia) Vitalij Durkin (Russia) Nina Vislova	21	21
(South Korea) Chung Eui-seok (South Korea) Yoo Hyun-young	21	21
8	(Malaysia) Tan Aik Quan (Malaysia) Lai Pei Jing	14	18

Final
3	(Russia) Vitalij Durkin (Russia) Nina Vislova	21	21
(South Korea) Chung Eui-seok (South Korea) Yoo Hyun-young	16	13

Preceded by 2011 Canada Open Grand Prix	BWF Grand Prix Gold and Grand Prix; 2011 BWF Season	Succeeded by 2011 Chinese Taipei Open Grand Prix Gold
