= 2014 Malaysia Super Series Premier =

Tournament details
- Dates: 14—19 January 2014
- Level: Super Series Premier
- Total prize money: US$500,000
- Venue: Putra Stadium, Bukit Jalil Sports Complex
- Location: Kuala Lumpur, Malaysia

Champions
- Men's singles: (Malaysia) Lee Chong Wei
- Women's singles: (China) Li Xuerui
- Men's doubles: (Malaysia) Goh V Shem (Malaysia) Lim Khim Wah
- Women's doubles: (China) Bao Yixin (China) Tang Jinhua
- Mixed doubles: (China) Xu Chen (China) Ma Jin

The 2014 Malaysia Super Series Premier was the second super series tournament of the 2014 BWF Super Series. The tournament took place in Kuala Lumpur, Malaysia from January 14–19, 2014 and had a total purse of $500,000. A qualification was held to fill four places in all five disciplines of the main draws.

== Men's singles ==
=== Seeds ===
1. (Malaysia) Lee Chong Wei (champion)
2. (China) Chen Long (quarter-finals)
3. (Denmark) Jan Ø. Jørgensen (semi-finals)
4. (Indonesia) Tommy Sugiarto (final)
5. (Japan) Kenichi Tago (semi-finals)
6. (Thailand) Boonsak Ponsana (second round)
7. (China) Du Pengyu (quarter-finals)
8. (Indonesia) Sony Dwi Kuncoro (withdrew)

=== Top half ===
First Round
1 | (Malaysia) Lee C W | 21 | 21
(Denmark) H-K Vittinghus | 7 | 13
PFQ | (India) A Pawar | 11 | 12
(China) Wang ZM | 21 | 21
7 | (China) Du PY | 21 | 21
(Malaysia) Liew DR | 14 | 13
(Japan) T Ueda | 21 | 15 | 6
(China) Chen YK | 9 | 21 | 21
3 | (Denmark) J Ø Jørgensen | 14 | 21 | 21
(Indonesia) D Y Rumbaka | 21 | 17 | 14
(India) P Kashyap | 21 | 21
(Germany) M Zwiebler | 19 | 13
6 | (Thailand) B Ponsana | 21 | 19 | 21
Q1 | (China) Gao H | 15 | 21 | 16
(Japan) K Momota | 12 | 24 | 21
(Denmark) V Axelsen | 21 | 22 | 18

Second Round
1 | (Malaysia) Lee C W | 21 | 21
(China) Wang ZM | 17 | 18
7 | (China) Du PY | 21 | 16 | 21
(China) Chen YK | 19 | 21 | 12
3 | (Denmark) J Ø Jørgensen | 21 | 21
(India) P Kashyap | 18 | 15
6 | (Thailand) B Ponsana | 9 | 13
(Japan) K Momota | 21 | 21

Quarterfinals
1 | (Malaysia) Lee C W | 21 | 21
7 | (China) Du PY | 9 | 15
3 | (Denmark) J Ø Jørgensen | 24 | 22
(Japan) K Momota | 22 | 20

Semifinals
1 | (Malaysia) Lee C W | 21 | 3
3 | (Denmark) J Ø Jørgensen | 13 | 0^{r}

=== Bottom half ===
First Round
(Vietnam) Nguyen T M | 17 | 16
(South Korea) Shon W-h | 21 | 21
(Hong Kong) Hu Y | 17 | 21 | 16
PFQ | (India) Srikanth K. | 21 | 18 | 21
(Japan) S Sasaki | 21 | 21
(Malaysia) Chong W F | 13 | 19
(England) R Ouseph | 13 | 12
4 | (Indonesia) T Sugiarto | 21 | 21
PFQ | (Netherlands) E Pang | 21 | 11 | 23
(India) R.M.V. Gurusai D | 18 | 21 | 21
Q2 | (Russia) V Ivanov | 15 | 19
5 | (Japan) K Tago | 21 | 21
(Thailand) T Saensomboonsuk | 22 | 21 | 19
Q4 | (Hong Kong) Wei N | 24 | 19 | 21
Q3 | (South Korea) Lee D-k | 21 | 20 | 11
2 | (China) Chen L | 18 | 22 | 21

Second Round
(South Korea) Shon W-h | 21 | 19 | 19
PFQ | (India) Srikanth K. | 11 | 21 | 21
(Japan) S Sasaki | 6 | 19
4 | (Indonesia) T Sugiarto | 21 | 21
PFQ | (Netherlands) E Pang | 17 | 13
5 | (Japan) K Tago | 21 | 21
Q4 | (Hong Kong) Wei N | 21 | 18 | 22
2 | (China) Chen L | 19 | 21 | 24

Quarterfinals
PFQ | (India) Srikanth K. | 10 | 15
4 | (Indonesia) T Sugiarto | 21 | 21
5 | (Japan) K Tago | 21 | 9 | 21
2 | (China) Chen L | 18 | 21 | 10

Semifinals
4 | (Indonesia) T Sugiarto | 21 | 21
5 | (Japan) K Tago | 13 | 18

=== Finals ===
Semifinals
1 | (Malaysia) Lee Chong Wei | 21 | 3
3 | (Denmark) Jan Ø. Jørgensen | 13 | 0^{r}
4 | (Indonesia) Tommy Sugiarto | 21 | 21
5 | (Japan) Kenichi Tago | 13 | 18

Final
1 | (Malaysia) Lee Chong Wei | 21 | 21
4 | (Indonesia) Tommy Sugiarto | 19 | 9

== Women's singles ==
=== Seeds ===
1. (China) Li Xuerui (champion)
2. (China) Wang Shixian (final)
3. (Thailand) Ratchanok Intanon (first round)
4. (China) Wang Yihan (quarter-finals)
5. (South Korea) Sung Ji-hyun (second round)
6. (South Korea) Bae Yeon-ju (semi-finals)
7. (Chinese Taipei) Tai Tzu-ying (second round)
8. (India) Saina Nehwal (second round)

=== Top half ===
First Round
1 | (China) Li XR | 5
(Thailand) P Buranaprasertsuk | 1^{r}
(Hong Kong) Chan T K | 21 | 12 | 12
(Japan) E Hirose | 18 | 21 | 21
7 | (Chinese Taipei) Tai T-y | 22 | 21
(Hong Kong) Yip P Y | 20 | 18
Q3 | (Indonesia) M Wiranto | 10 | 16
(Indonesia) B Manuputty | 21 | 21
4 | (China) Wang YH | 21 | 21
(Spain) B Corrales | 14 | 14
(Spain) C Marín | 11 | 16
(China) Han L | 21 | 21
8 | (India) S Nehwal | 21 | 21
(Indonesia) H Desi | 10 | 16
Q1 | (Malaysia) Tee J Y | 16 | 14
(China) Yao X | 21 | 21

Second Round
1 | (China) Li XR | 21 | 21 | 21
(Japan) E Hirose | 23 | 12 | 10
7 | (Chinese Taipei) Tai T-y | 21 | 7^{r}
(Indonesia) B Manuputty | 23 | 11
4 | (China) Wang YH | 21 | 21
(China) Han L | 13 | 12
8 | (India) S Nehwal | 21 | 10 | 19
(China) Yao X | 16 | 21 | 21

Quarterfinals
1 | (China) Li XR | 21 | 21
(Indonesia) B Manuputty | 11 | 15
4 | (China) Wang YH | 17 | 17
(China) Yao X | 21 | 21

Semifinals
1 | (China) Li XR | 21 | 21
(China) Yao X | 17 | 8

=== Bottom half ===
First Round
(India) P.V. Sindhu | 21 | 21
(Indonesia) L Fanetri | 17 | 17
(Indonesia) A Yuswandari | 19 | 18
6 | (South Korea) Bae Y-j | 21 | 21
(Germany) J Schenk | 0^{r}
(Japan) M Mitani | 1
Q4 | (Japan) A Yamaguchi | 21 | 23 | 21
3 | (Thailand) R Intanon | 18 | 25 | 16
Q2 | (Indonesia) A Firdasari | 19 | 14
(Thailand) N Jindapon | 21 | 21
PFQ | (France) S V Waran | 12 | 11
5 | (South Korea) Sung J-h | 21 | 21
(China) Sun Y | 24 | 21
(Thailand) B Ongbumrungpan | 22 | 16
(Japan) S Takahashi | 15 | 21 | 20
2 | (China) Wang SX | 21 | 16 | 22

Second Round
(India) P.V. Sindhu | 16 | 19
6 | (South Korea) Bae Y-j | 21 | 21
(Japan) M Mitani | 7 | 15
Q4 | (Japan) A Yamaguchi | 21 | 21
(Thailand) N Jindapon | 14 | 21 | 21
5 | (South Korea) Sung J-h | 21 | 11 | 16
(China) Sun Y | 15 | 18
2 | (China) Wang SX | 21 | 21

Quarterfinals
6 | (South Korea) Bae Y-j | 21 | 21
Q4 | (Japan) A Yamaguchi | 15 | 16
(Thailand) N Jindapon | 17 | 19
2 | (China) Wang SX | 21 | 21

Semifinals
6 | (South Korea) Bae Y-j | 9 | 16
2 | (China) Wang SX | 21 | 21

=== Finals ===
Semifinals
1 | (China) Li Xuerui | 21 | 21
(China) Yao Xue | 17 | 8
6 | (South Korea) Bae Yeon-ju | 9 | 16
2 | (China) Wang Shixian | 21 | 21

Final
1 | (China) Li Xuerui | 21 | 21
2 | (China) Wang Shixian | 16 | 17

== Men's doubles ==
=== Seeds ===
1. (Indonesia) Mohammad Ahsan / Hendra Setiawan (second round)
2. (Denmark) Mathias Boe / Carsten Mogensen (first round)
3. (South Korea) Kim Ki-jung / Kim Sa-rang (first round)
4. (China) Liu Xiaolong / Qiu Zihan (second round)
5. (South Korea) Lee Yong-dae / Yoo Yeon-seong (quarter-finals)
6. (Japan) Hiroyuki Endo / Kenichi Hayakawa (semi-finals)
7. (Malaysia) Koo Kien Keat / Tan Boon Heong (first round)
8. (Malaysia) Hoon Thien How / Tan Wee Kiong (first round)

=== Top half ===
First Round
1 | (Indonesia) M Ahsan (Indonesia) H Setiawan | 21 | 21
(England) C Adcock (England) A Ellis | 18 | 9
(Chinese Taipei) Lee S-m (Chinese Taipei) Tsai C-h | 17 | 21 | 23
(Indonesia) B Angriawan (Indonesia) R K Suwardi | 21 | 17 | 21
6 | (Japan) H Endo (Japan) K Hayakawa | 21 | 21
(Malaysia) M Z A Latif (Malaysia) M F M Tazari | 6 | 7
(Netherlands) R Bosch (Netherlands) K Ridder | 21 | 21
Q3 | (Malaysia) Chooi K M (Malaysia) Teo E Y | 13 | 17
3 | (South Korea) Kim K-j (South Korea) Kim S-r | 13 | 15
(China) Fu HF (China) Zhang N | 21 | 21
(Japan) T Kamura (Japan) K Sonoda | 20 | 16
(Indonesia) M F Gideon (Indonesia) M Kido | 22 | 21
7 | (Malaysia) Koo K K (Malaysia) Tan B H | 17 | 14
(China) Chai B (China) Hong W | 21 | 21
(Japan) H Hashimoto (Japan) N Hirata | 21 | 21
(Denmark) A Skårup Rasmussen (Denmark) K Astrup Sorensen | 10 | 14

Second Round
1 | (Indonesia) M Ahsan (Indonesia) H Setiawan | 10 | 21 | 13
(Chinese Taipei) Lee S-m (Chinese Taipei) Tsai C-h | 21 | 19 | 21
6 | (Japan) H Endo (Japan) K Hayakawa | 21 | 21
(Netherlands) R Bosch (Netherlands) K Ridder | 9 | 8
(China) Fu HF (China) Zhang N | 14 | 23
(Indonesia) M F Gideon (Indonesia) M Kido | 21 | 25
(China) Chai B (China) Hong W | 21 | 21
(Japan) H Hashimoto (Japan) N Hirata | 17 | 19

Quarterfinals
(Chinese Taipei) Lee S-m (Chinese Taipei) Tsai C-h | 12 | 13
6 | (Japan) H Endo (Japan) K Hayakawa | 21 | 21
(Indonesia) M F Gideon (Indonesia) M Kido | 14 | 21 | 15
(China) Chai B (China) Hong W | 21 | 11 | 21

Semifinals
6 | (Japan) H Endo (Japan) K Hayakawa | 12 | 12
(China) Chai B (China) Hong W | 21 | 21

=== Bottom half ===
First Round
Q1 | (Indonesia) F Kurniawan (Indonesia) B Septano | 21 | 21
Q4 | (Malaysia) M R A Latif (Malaysia) M H Hashim | 15 | 16
(Indonesia) W N A Pankaryanira (Indonesia) A Yusuf | 17 | 19
5 | (South Korea) Lee Y-d (South Korea) Yoo Y-s | 21 | 21
(Indonesia) A Pratama (Indonesia) R A Saputro | 21 | 21
(Denmark) M Conrad-Petersen (Denmark) M Pieler Kolding | 16 | 19
(South Korea) Lee S-j (South Korea) Shin B-c | 23 | 18 | 18
4 | (China) Liu XL (China) Qiu ZH | 21 | 21 | 21
(Germany) M Fuchs (Germany) J Schöttler | 21 | 21
Q2 | (Hong Kong) Chan Y L (Hong Kong) Lee C H | 19 | 12
(England) C Langridge (England) P Mills | 18 | 21 | 22
8 | (Malaysia) Hoon T H (Malaysia) Tan W K | 21 | 19 | 20
(Russia) V Ivanov (Russia) I Sozonov | 17 | 21 | 15
(Thailand) M Jongjit (Thailand) N Puangpuapech | 21 | 19 | 21
(Malaysia) Goh V S (Malaysia) Lim K W | 24 | 17 | 21
2 | (Denmark) M Boe (Denmark) C Mogensen | 22 | 21 | 18

Second Round
(Indonesia) F Kurniawan (Indonesia) B Septano | 19 | 24
5 | (South Korea) Lee Y-d (South Korea) Yoo Y-s | 21 | 26
(Indonesia) A Pratama (Indonesia) R A Saputro | 21 | 21
4 | (China) Liu XL (China) Qiu ZH | 18 | 19
(Germany) M Fuchs (Germany) J Schöttler | 13 | 21 | 14
(England) C Langridge (England) P Mills | 21 | 19 | 21
(Thailand) M Jongjit (Thailand) N Puangpuapech | 19 | 23
(Malaysia) Goh V S (Malaysia) Lim K W | 21 | 25

Quarterfinals
5 | (South Korea) Lee Y-d (South Korea) Yoo Y-s | 20 | 16
(Indonesia) A Pratama (Indonesia) R A Saputro | 22 | 21
(England) C Langridge (England) P Mills | 16 | 14
(Malaysia) Goh V S (Malaysia) Lim K W | 21 | 21

Semifinals
(Indonesia) A Pratama (Indonesia) R A Saputro | 25 | 13 | 20
(Malaysia) Goh V S (Malaysia) Lim K W | 23 | 21 | 22

=== Finals ===
Semifinals
6 | (Japan) Hiroyuki Endo (Japan) Kenichi Hayakawa | 12 | 12
(China) Chai Biao (China) Hong Wei | 21 | 21
(Indonesia) Angga Pratama (Indonesia) Rian Agung Saputro | 25 | 13 | 20
(Malaysia) Goh V Shem (Malaysia) Lim Khim Wah | 23 | 21 | 22

Final
(China) Chai Biao (China) Hong Wei | 19 | 18
(Malaysia) Goh V Shem (Malaysia) Lim Khim Wah | 21 | 21

== Women's doubles ==
=== Seeds ===
1. (China) Wang Xiaoli / Yu Yang (withdrew)
2. (Denmark) Christinna Pedersen / Kamilla Rytter Juhl (semi-finals)
3. (Japan) Misaki Matsutomo / Ayaka Takahashi (final)
4. (Indonesia) Pia Zebadiah Bernadeth / Rizki Amelia Pradipta (quarter-finals)
5. (China) Bao Yixin / Tang Jinhua (champions)
6. (China) Tian Qing / Zhao Yunlei (quarter-finals)
7. (South Korea) Chang Ye-na / Kim So-yeong (first round)
8. (Thailand) Duanganong Aroonkesorn / Kunchala Voravichitchaikul (second round)

=== Top half ===
First Round
PFQ | (Hong Kong) Chan T K (Hong Kong) Tse Y S | 11 | 11
(Japan) R Kakiiwa (Japan) M Maeda | 21 | 21
(Singapore) S M Sari (Singapore) Yao L | 22 | 15 | 22
(Japan) M Aratama (Japan) M Taruno | 20 | 21 | 20
7 | (South Korea) Chang Y-n (South Korea) Kim S-y | 21 | 18 | 12
(Indonesia) N K Maheswari (Indonesia) G Polii | 5 | 21 | 21
(England) G Adcock (England) L Smith | 18 | 18
(Hong Kong) Chau H W (Hong Kong) Poon L Y | 21 | 21
3 | (Japan) M Matsutomo (Japan) A Takahashi | 21 | 21
(South Korea) Jung K-e (South Korea) Shin S-c | 15 | 18
Q2 | (Thailand) C Chaladchalam (Thailand) P Munkitamorn | 21 | 14 | 18
(Indonesia) A S Awanda (Indonesia) D D Haris | 17 | 21 | 21
6 | (China) Tian Q (China) Zhao YL | 21 | 21
Q1 | (Malaysia) Teoh M X (Malaysia) Too S Y | 9 | 5
(Malaysia) Lee M Y (Malaysia) Lim Y L | 21 | 18 | 21
Q4 | (Malaysia) W C J Choong (Malaysia) Yap C W | 16 | 21 | 18

Second Round
(Japan) R Kakiiwa (Japan) M Maeda | 21 | 21
(Singapore) S M Sari (Singapore) Yao L | 14 | 12
(Indonesia) N K Maheswari (Indonesia) G Polii | 21 | 21
(Hong Kong) Chau H W (Hong Kong) Poon L Y | 7 | 16
3 | (Japan) M Matsutomo (Japan) A Takahashi | 21 | 19 | 21
(Indonesia) A S Awanda (Indonesia) D D Haris | 12 | 21 | 12
6 | (China) Tian Q (China) Zhao YL | 21 | 21
(Malaysia) Lee M Y (Malaysia) Lim Y L | 18 | 19

Quarterfinals
(Japan) R Kakiiwa (Japan) M Maeda | 21 | 21
(Indonesia) N K Maheswari (Indonesia) G Polii | 19 | 11
3 | (Japan) M Matsutomo (Japan) A Takahashi | 18 | 21 | 21
6 | (China) Tian Q (China) Zhao YL | 21 | 14 | 13

Semifinals
(Japan) R Kakiiwa (Japan) M Maeda | 25 | 15 | 13
3 | (Japan) M Matsutomo (Japan) A Takahashi | 23 | 21 | 21

=== Bottom half ===
First Round
(Indonesia) S R Andini (Indonesia) T R Nuraidah | 19 | 21 | 21
(Thailand) S Amitrapai (Thailand) L Narissapat | 21 | 15 | 19
(Singapore) Fu MT (Singapore) V Neo Y Y | 14 | 14
5 | (China) Bao YX (China) Tang JH | 21 | 21
(Malaysia) A A Anscelly (Malaysia) Soong F C | 21 | 21
(England) H Olver (England) K Robertshaw | 17 | 13
(South Korea) Go A-r (South Korea) Yoo H-w | 21 | 16 | 12
4 | (Indonesia) P Z Bernadeth (Indonesia) R A Pradipta | 17 | 21 | 21
(Malaysia) V Hoo K M (Malaysia) Woon K W | 16 | 12
(China) Ma J (China) Tang YT | 21 | 21
(Germany) J Goliszewski (Germany) B Michels | 14 | 18
8 | (Thailand) D Aroonkesorn (Thailand) K Voravichitchaikul | 21 | 21
Q3 | (Indonesia) D Fitriani (Indonesia) N Melati | 21 | 12 | 16
(Indonesia) V A P Lejarsari (Indonesia) V Marissa | 19 | 21 | 21
(South Korea) Chae Y-j (South Korea) Kim J-w | 21 | 11 | 17
2 | (Denmark) C Pedersen (Denmark) K Rytter Juhl | 16 | 21 | 21

Second Round
(Indonesia) S R Andini (Indonesia) T R Nuraidah | 21 | 18 | 19
5 | (China) Bao YX (China) Tang JH | 18 | 21 | 21
(Malaysia) A A Anscelly (Malaysia) Soong F C | 18 | 9
4 | (Indonesia) P Z Bernadeth (Indonesia) R A Pradipta | 21 | 21
(China) Ma J (China) Tang YT | 21 | 19 | 21
8 | (Thailand) D Aroonkesorn (Thailand) K Voravichitchaikul | 19 | 21 | 6
(Indonesia) V A P Lejarsari (Indonesia) V Marissa | 18 | 18
2 | (Denmark) C Pedersen (Denmark) K Rytter Juhl | 21 | 21

Quarterfinals
5 | (China) Bao YX (China) Tang JH | 21 | 21
4 | (Indonesia) P Z Bernadeth (Indonesia) R A Pradipta | 16 | 8
(China) Ma J (China) Tang YT | 21 | 19 | 6
2 | (Denmark) C Pedersen (Denmark) K Rytter Juhl | 17 | 21 | 21

Semifinals
5 | (China) Bao YX (China) Tang JH | 21 | 21
2 | (Denmark) C Pedersen (Denmark) K Rytter Juhl | 13 | 11

=== Finals ===
Semifinals
(Japan) Reika Kakiiwa (Japan) Miyuki Maeda | 25 | 15 | 13
3 | (Japan) Misaki Matsutomo (Japan) Ayaka Takahashi | 23 | 21 | 21
5 | (China) Bao Yixin (China) Tang Jinhua | 21 | 21
2 | (Denmark) Christinna Pedersen (Denmark) Kamilla Rytter Juhl | 13 | 11

Final
3 | (Japan) Misaki Matsutomo (Japan) Ayaka Takahashi | 19 | 21 | 13
5 | (China) Bao Yixin (China) Tang Jinhua | 21 | 14 | 21

== Mixed doubles ==
=== Seeds ===
1. (China) Zhang Nan / Zhao Yunlei (semi-finals)
2. (Indonesia) Tontowi Ahmad / Liliyana Natsir (semi-finals)
3. (Denmark) Joachim Fischer Nielsen / Christinna Pedersen (final)
4. (China) Xu Chen / Ma Jin (champions)
5. (England) Chris Adcock / Gabrielle Adcock (quarter-finals)
6. (Malaysia) Chan Peng Soon / Goh Liu Ying (second round)
7. (Thailand) Sudket Prapakamol / Saralee Thoungthongkam (quarter-finals)
8. (Indonesia) Markis Kido / Pia Zebadiah Bernadeth (quarter-finals)

=== Top half ===
First Round
1 | (China) Zhang N (China) Zhao YL | 21 | 21
(Japan) H Hashimoto (Japan) M Maeda | 17 | 9
Q3 | (China) Chai B (China) Tang JH | 21 | 19 | 15
(South Korea) Lee Y-d (South Korea) Shin S-c | 16 | 21 | 21
5 | (England) C Adcock (England) G Adcock | 21 | 21
(China) Liu C (China) Bao YX | 14 | 13
(Germany) M Fuchs (Germany) B Michels | 21 | 21
(South Korea) Kim K-j (South Korea) Kim S-y | 16 | 16
3 | (Denmark) J Fischer Nielsen (Denmark) C Pedersen | 21 | 21
(Hong Kong) Chan Y L (Hong Kong) Tse Y S | 12 | 13
Q2 | (South Korea) Kang J-w (South Korea) Go A-r | 21 | 22
Q1 | (Denmark) M Pieler Kolding (Denmark) K Rytter Juhl | 18 | 20
6 | (Malaysia) Chan P S (Malaysia) Goh L Y | 23 | 17 | 21
(Indonesia) M Rijal (Indonesia) V Marissa | 21 | 21 | 10
(Indonesia) P Jordan (Indonesia) D Susanto | 21 | 21
(Malaysia) Tan A Q (Malaysia) Lai P J | 14 | 13

Second Round
1 | (China) Zhang N (China) Zhao YL | 21 | 21
(South Korea) Lee Y-d (South Korea) Shin S-c | 15 | 13
5 | (England) C Adcock (England) G Adcock | 23 | 16 | 21
(Germany) M Fuchs (Germany) B Michels | 21 | 21 | 6
3 | (Denmark) J Fischer Nielsen (Denmark) C Pedersen | 21 | 16 | 21
Q2 | (South Korea) Kang J-w (South Korea) Go A-r | 11 | 21 | 8
6 | (Malaysia) Chan P S (Malaysia) Goh L Y | 21 | 17 | 22
(Indonesia) P Jordan (Indonesia) D Susanto | 18 | 21 | 24

Quarterfinals
1 | (China) Zhang N (China) Zhao YL | 18 | 21 | 21
5 | (England) C Adcock (England) G Adcock | 21 | 17 | 13
3 | (Denmark) J Fischer Nielsen (Denmark) C Pedersen | 21 | 21
(Indonesia) P Jordan (Indonesia) D Susanto | 12 | 19

Semifinals
1 | (China) Zhang N (China) Zhao YL | 10 | 12
3 | (Denmark) J Fischer Nielsen (Denmark) C Pedersen | 21 | 21

=== Bottom half ===
First Round
(Malaysia) Ong J G (Malaysia) Lim Y L | 25 | 21
(United States) P Chew (United States) J Subandhi | 23 | 12
(England) C Langridge (England) H Olver | 9 | 20
7 | (Thailand) S Prapakamol (Thailand) S Thoungthongkam | 21 | 22
(Indonesia) R Widianto (Indonesia) R P Dili | 19 | 21 | 21
(South Korea) Yoo Y-s (South Korea) Chang Y-n | 21 | 17 | 17
(South Korea) Shin B-c (South Korea) Eom H-w | 13 | 21 | 16
4 | (China) Xu C (China) Ma J | 21 | 12 | 21
Q4 | (Indonesia) M F Gideon (Indonesia) R A Pradipta | 14 | 17
(South Korea) Choi S-k (South Korea) Chae Y-j | 21 | 21
(Denmark) A Kristiansen (Denmark) J Houmann | 19 | 21 | 22
8 | (Indonesia) M Kido (Indonesia) P Z Bernadeth | 21 | 9 | 24
(Hong Kong) Lee C H (Hong Kong) Chau H W | 19 | 21 | 16
(Singapore) D B Chrisnanta (Singapore) V Neo Y Y | 21 | 19 | 21
(Japan) K Hayakawa (Japan) M Matsutomo | 10 | 17
2 | (Indonesia) T Ahmad (Indonesia) L Natsir | 21 | 21

Second Round
(Malaysia) Ong J G (Malaysia) Lim Y L | 19 | 21 | 17
7 | (Thailand) S Prapakamol (Thailand) S Thoungthongkam | 21 | 14 | 21
(Indonesia) R Widianto (Indonesia) R P Dili | 14 | 16
4 | (China) Xu C (China) Ma J | 21 | 21
(South Korea) Choi S-k (South Korea) Chae Y-j | 16 | 17
8 | (Indonesia) M Kido (Indonesia) P Z Bernadeth | 21 | 21
(Singapore) D B Chrisnanta (Singapore) V Neo Y Y | 16 | 15
2 | (Indonesia) T Ahmad (Indonesia) L Natsir | 21 | 21

Quarterfinals
7 | (Thailand) S Prapakamol (Thailand) S Thoungthongkam | 12 | 13
4 | (China) Xu C (China) Ma J | 21 | 21
8 | (Indonesia) M Kido (Indonesia) P Z Bernadeth
2 | (Indonesia) T Ahmad (Indonesia) L Natsir | w | / | o

Semifinals
4 | (China) Xu C (China) Ma J | 21 | 21
2 | (Indonesia) T Ahmad (Indonesia) L Natsir | 13 | 14

=== Finals ===
Semifinals
1 | (China) Zhang Nan (China) Zhao Yunlei | 10 | 12
3 | (Denmark) Joachim Fischer Nielsen (Denmark) Christinna Pedersen | 21 | 21
4 | (China) Xu Chen (China) Ma Jin | 21 | 21
2 | (Indonesia) Tontowi Ahmad (Indonesia) Liliyana Natsir | 13 | 14

Final
3 | (Denmark) Joachim Fischer Nielsen (Denmark) Christinna Pedersen | 11 | 21 | 13
4 | (China) Xu Chen (China) Ma Jin | 21 | 17 | 21

| Preceded by 2013 Malaysia Super Series | Malaysia Open | Succeeded by 2015 Malaysia Super Series Premier |
| Preceded by 2014 Korea Open Super Series | BWF Super Series; 2014 season | Succeeded by 2014 All England Super Series Premier |
