= Hong Wei =

Chinese badminton player (born 1989

Hong Wei 洪炜
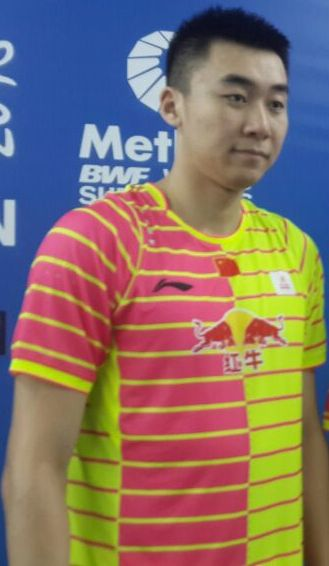
- Hong Wei at the 2016 Indonesia Open

Personal information
- Born: 4 October 1989 (age 37) Xiamen, China
- Height: 1.92 m (6 ft 4 in)
- Weight: 77 kg (170 lb)
- Spouse: Zhao Yunlei (m. 2018)

Sport
- Country: China
- Sport: Badminton
- Handedness: Right

Men's doubles
- Highest ranking: 2 (with Chai Biao, 17 November 2016)
- BWF profile
Medal record
Men's badminton
Representing China
World Championships
Bronze medal – third place	2017 Glasgow	Men's doubles
Sudirman Cup
Gold medal – first place	2013 Kuala Lumpur	Mixed team
Gold medal – first place	2015 Dongguan	Mixed team
Thomas Cup
Gold medal – first place	2012 Wuhan	Men's team
Bronze medal – third place	2014 New Delhi	Men's team
Asian Championships
Bronze medal – third place	2011 Chengdu	Mixed doubles
Bronze medal – third place	2012 Qingdao	Men's doubles
Bronze medal – third place	2017 Wuhan	Men's doubles
East Asian Games
Gold medal – first place	2013 Tianjin	Men's team

Hong Wei (simplified Chinese: 洪炜; traditional Chinese: 洪煒; born 4 October 1989) is a Chinese professional badminton player. He competed at the 2016 Rio in the men's doubles event, and placed fourth after losing the bronze medal match to Great Britain pair Chris Langridge and Marcus Ellis.

== Achievements ==
=== BWF World Championships ===
Men's doubles
Year	Venue	Partner	Opponent	Score	Result
2017	Emirates Arena; Glasgow, Scotland	(China) Chai Biao	(China) Liu Cheng (China) Zhang Nan	17–21, 19–21	Bronze

=== Asian Championships ===
Men's doubles
Year	Venue	Partner	Opponent	Score	Result
2012	Qingdao Sports Centre Conson Stadium; Qingdao, China	(China) Shen Ye	(Japan) Hiroyuki Endo (Japan) Kenichi Hayakawa	12–21, 17–21	Bronze
2017	Wuhan Sports Center Gymnasium; Wuhan, China	(China) Chai Biao	(China) Huang Kaixiang (China) Wang Yilyu	16–21, 19–21	Bronze

Mixed doubles
Year	Venue	Partner	Opponent	Score	Result
2011	Sichuan Gymnasium; Chengdu, China	(China) Pan Pan	(China) Zhang Nan (China) Zhao Yunlei	15–21, 11–21	Bronze

=== BWF Superseries ===
The BWF Superseries, which was launched on 14 December 2006 and implemented in 2007, is a series of elite badminton tournaments, sanctioned by the Badminton World Federation (BWF). BWF Superseries levels are Superseries and Superseries Premier. A season of Superseries consists of twelve tournaments around the world that have been introduced since 2011. Successful players are invited to the Superseries Finals, which are held at the end of each year.

Men's doubles
Year	Tournament	Partner	Opponent	Score	Result
2013	Japan Open	(China) Chai Biao	(Indonesia) Mohammad Ahsan (Indonesia) Hendra Setiawan	20–22, 16–21	(silver) Runner-up
2014	Korea Open	(China) Fu Haifeng	(Denmark) Mathias Boe (Denmark) Carsten Mogensen	12–21, 17–21	(silver) Runner-up
2014	Malaysia Open	(China) Chai Biao	(Malaysia) Goh V Shem (Malaysia) Lim Khim Wah	19–21, 18–21	(silver) Runner-up
2014	China Open	(China) Chai Biao	(South Korea) Lee Yong-dae (South Korea) Yoo Yeon-seong	14–21, 15–21	(silver) Runner-up
2014	Dubai World Superseries Finals	(China) Chai Biao	(South Korea) Lee Yong-dae (South Korea) Yoo Yeon-seong	21–19, 19–21, 16–21	(silver) Runner-up
2015	India Open	(China) Chai Biao	(Denmark) Mads Conrad-Petersen (Denmark) Mads Pieler Kolding	21–18, 21–14	(gold) Winner
2015	China Open	(China) Chai Biao	(South Korea) Kim Gi-jung (South Korea) Kim Sa-rang	13–21, 19–21	(silver) Runner-up
2015	Dubai World Superseries Finals	(China) Chai Biao	(Indonesia) Mohammad Ahsan (Indonesia) Hendra Setiawan	21–13, 14–21, 14–21	(silver) Runner-up
2016	Malaysia Open	(China) Chai Biao	(South Korea) Kim Gi-jung (South Korea) Kim Sa-rang	19–21, 15–21	(silver) Runner-up
2016	Indonesia Open	(China) Chai Biao	(South Korea) Lee Yong-dae (South Korea) Yoo Yeon-seong	21–13, 13–21, 16–21	(silver) Runner-up

BWF Super Series Finals tournament
BWF Super Series Premier tournament
BWF Super Series tournament

=== BWF Grand Prix ===
The BWF Grand Prix had two levels, the BWF Grand Prix and Grand Prix Gold. It was a series of badminton tournaments sanctioned by the Badminton World Federation (BWF) which was held from 2007 to 2017.

Men's doubles

Year	Tournament	Partner	Opponent	Score	Result
2012	German Open	(China) Shen Ye	(South Korea) Jung Jae-sung (South Korea) Lee Yong-dae	21–19, 18–21, 21–19	(gold) Winner
2013	German Open	(China) Chai Biao	(China) Liu Xiaolong (China) Qiu Zihan	21–10, 21–14	(gold) Winner
2013	Swiss Open	(China) Chai Biao	(South Korea) Ko Sung-hyun (South Korea) Lee Yong-dae	21–14, 18–21, 21–14	(gold) Winner
2014	Swiss Open	(China) Chai Biao	(China) Fu Haifeng (China) Zhang Nan	22–20, 21–14	(gold) Winner
2015	Indonesian Masters	(China) Chai Biao	(Indonesia) Berry Angriawan (Indonesia) Rian Agung Saputro	11–21, 20–22	(silver) Runner-up
2017	Swiss Open	(China) Chai Biao	(China) Liu Cheng (China) Zhang Nan	13–21, 21–16, 21–15	(gold) Winner

BWF Grand Prix Gold tournament
BWF Grand Prix tournament
