= Chai Biao =

Chinese badminton player

Chai Biao 柴飚
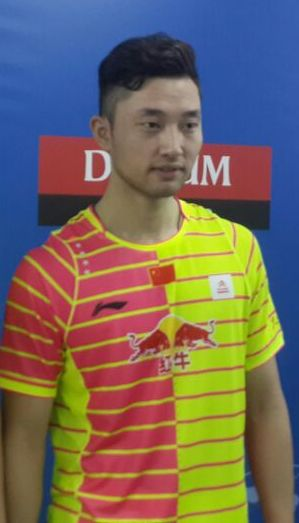
- Chai Biao at the 2016 Indonesia Open

Personal information
- Born: 柴飚; 10 October 1990 (age 36) Hunan, China
- Height: 1.85 m (6 ft 1 in)
- Weight: 73 kg (161 lb)

Sport
- Country: China
- Sport: Badminton
- Handedness: Right

Men's doubles
- Highest ranking: 2 (with Hong Wei 17 November 2016)
- BWF profile
Medal record
Men's badminton
Representing China
World Championships
Bronze medal – third place	2017 Glasgow	Men's doubles
Sudirman Cup
Gold medal – first place	2009 Guangzhou	Mixed team
Gold medal – first place	2011 Qingdao	Mixed team
Gold medal – first place	2013 Kuala Lumpur	Mixed team
Gold medal – first place	2015 Dongguan	Mixed team
Thomas Cup
Gold medal – first place	2010 Kuala Lumpur	Men's team
Gold medal – first place	2012 Wuhan	Men's team
Bronze medal – third place	2014 New Delhi	Men's team
Asian Championships
Bronze medal – third place	2009 Suwon	Men's doubles
Bronze medal – third place	2011 Chengdu	Men's doubles
Bronze medal – third place	2012 Qingdao	Men's doubles
Bronze medal – third place	2017 Wuhan	Men's doubles
Asia Team Championships
Silver medal – second place	2018 Alor Setar	Men's team
East Asian Games
Gold medal – first place	2009 Hong Kong	Men's team
Gold medal – first place	2013 Tianjin	Men's team
Bronze medal – third place	2009 Hong Kong	Men's doubles
World Junior Championships
Gold medal – first place	2007 Waitakere City	Mixed team
Gold medal – first place	2008 Pune	Mixed doubles
Gold medal – first place	2008 Pune	Mixed team
Silver medal – second place	2007 Waitakere City	Boys' doubles
Silver medal – second place	2008 Pune	Boys' doubles
Asian Junior Championships
Gold medal – first place	2007 Kuala Lumpur	Boys' doubles
Gold medal – first place	2008 Kuala Lumpur	Mixed team
Silver medal – second place	2007 Kuala Lumpur	Mixed team
Bronze medal – third place	2008 Kuala Lumpur	Boys' doubles

Chai Biao (simplified Chinese: 柴飚; traditional Chinese: 柴飈; born 10 October 1990) is a Chinese professional badminton player. Chai has concentrated on men's doubles for the majority of his senior career in badminton. His most successful partnership was with Hong Wei: together they reached the year-end tournament BWF Superseries Finals in 2014 and 2015. As Hong has since retired, Chai's current partner in men's doubles is Wang Zekang.

== Career ==
Chai was born in Yanfeng District of Hengyang City in 1990. At the age of 7, he learned badminton from the senior coach of the Badminton Institute in the City Sports School. Due to his rapid progress, he was transferred to Hunan Badminton Team for professional training four years later. He won the National Junior Championship. In 2007, he was selected for the national badminton team, and early in July that year, he competed at the Asian Junior Championships and won the boys' doubles title. In November, Chai won a gold in the mixed team event and a silver in the boys' doubles event at the World Junior Championships. In 2008, Chai repeated his success at the World Junior Championships in Pune, India, by winning two golds in the mixed doubles and team event and a silver in the boys' doubles event. Chai was a bronze medalist at the Asia Championships in the men's doubles event in 2009 and 2012.

== Achievements ==
=== BWF World Championships ===
Men's doubles
Year	Venue	Partner	Opponent	Score	Result
2017	Emirates Arena, Glasgow, Scotland	(China) Hong Wei	(China) Liu Cheng (China) Zhang Nan	17–21, 19–21	Bronze

=== Asian Championships ===
Men's doubles
Year	Venue	Partner	Opponent	Score	Result
2009	Suwon Indoor Stadium; Suwon, South Korea	(China) Liu Xiaolong	(Indonesia) Markis Kido (Indonesia) Hendra Setiawan	17–21, 15–21	Bronze
2011	Sichuan Gymnasium; Chengdu, China	(China) Guo Zhendong	(Japan) Hirokatsu Hashimoto (Japan) Noriyasu Hirata	14–21, 19–21	Bronze
2012	Qingdao Sports Centre Conson Stadium; Qingdao, China	(China) Guo Zhendong	(South Korea) Kim Gi-jung (South Korea) Kim Sa-rang	17–21, 9–21	Bronze
2017	Wuhan Sports Center Gymnasium; Wuhan, China	(China) Hong Wei	(China) Huang Kaixiang (China) Wang Yilyu	16–21, 19–21	Bronze

=== East Asian Games ===
Men's doubles
Year	Venue	Partner	Opponent	Score	Result
2009	Queen Elizabeth Stadium, Hong Kong	(China) Zhang Nan	(Chinese Taipei) Chen Hung-ling (Chinese Taipei) Lin Yu-lang	18–21, 16–21	Bronze

=== BWF World Junior Championships ===
Boys' doubles
Year	Venue	Partner	Opponent	Score	Result
2007	The Trusts Stadium; Waitakere City, New Zealand	(China) Li Tian	(South Korea) Chung Eui-Seok (South Korea) Shin Baek-cheol	26–24, 19–21, 15–21	Silver
2008	Shree Shiv Chhatrapati Badminton Hall; Pune, India	(China) Qiu Zihan	(Malaysia) Mak Hee Chun (Malaysia) Teo Kok Siang	18–21, 14–21	Silver

Mixed doubles
Year	Venue	Partner	Opponent	Score	Result
2008	Shree Shiv Chhatrapati Badminton Hall; Pune, India	(China) Xie Jing	(China) Zhang Nan (China) Lu Lu	21–19, 21–15	Gold

=== Asian Junior Championships ===
Boys' doubles
Year	Venue	Partner	Opponent	Score	Result
2007	Stadium Juara; Kuala Lumpur, Malaysia	(China) Li Tian	(Malaysia) Mohd Lutfi Zaim Abdul Khalid (Malaysia) Tan Wee Kiong	21–12, 21–8	Gold
2008	Stadium Juara; Kuala Lumpur, Malaysia	(China) Zhang Nan	(Malaysia) Mak Hee Chun (Malaysia) Teo Kok Siang	17–21, 18–21	Bronze

=== BWF Superseries ===
The BWF Superseries, which was launched on 14 December 2006 and implemented in 2007, was a series of elite badminton tournaments, sanctioned by the Badminton World Federation (BWF). BWF Superseries levels were Superseries and Superseries Premier. A season of Superseries consisted of twelve tournaments around the world that had been introduced since 2011. Successful players were invited to the Superseries Finals, which were held at the end of each year.

Men's doubles
Year	Tournament	Partner	Opponent	Score	Result
2010	China Open	(China) Zhang Nan	(South Korea) Jung Jae-sung (South Korea) Lee Yong-dae	15–21, 12–21	(silver) Runner-up
2011	Malaysia Open	(China) Guo Zhendong	(Denmark) Mads Conrad-Petersen (Denmark) Jonas Rasmussen	21–16, 21–14	(gold) Winner
2011	Indonesia Open	(China) Guo Zhendong	(China) Cai Yun (China) Fu Haifeng	13–21, 12–21	(silver) Runner-up
2011	World Superseries Finals	(China) Guo Zhendong	(Denmark) Mathias Boe (Denmark) Carsten Mogensen	23–25, 7–21	(silver) Runner-up
2012	China Masters	(China) Zhang Nan	(Japan) Hiroyuki Endo (Japan) Kenichi Hayakawa	21–18, 21–17	(gold) Winner
2013	Japan Open	(China) Hong Wei	(Indonesia) Mohammad Ahsan (Indonesia) Hendra Setiawan	20–22, 16–21	(silver) Runner-up
2014	Malaysia Open	(China) Hong Wei	(Malaysia) Goh V Shem (Malaysia) Lim Khim Wah	19–21, 18–21	(silver) Runner-up
2014	China Open	(China) Hong Wei	(South Korea) Lee Yong-dae (South Korea) Yoo Yeon-seong	14–21, 15–21	(silver) Runner-up
2014	Dubai World Superseries Finals	(China) Hong Wei	(South Korea) Lee Yong-dae (South Korea) Yoo Yeon-seong	21–19, 19–21, 16–21	(silver) Runner-up
2015	India Open	(China) Hong Wei	(Denmark) Mads Conrad-Petersen (Denmark) Mads Pieler Kolding	21–18, 21–14	(gold) Winner
2015	China Open	(China) Hong Wei	(South Korea) Kim Gi-jung (South Korea) Kim Sa-rang	13–21, 19–21	(silver) Runner-up
2015	Dubai World Superseries Finals	(China) Hong Wei	(Indonesia) Mohammad Ahsan (Indonesia) Hendra Setiawan	21–13, 14–21, 14–21	(silver) Runner-up
2016	Malaysia Open	(China) Hong Wei	(South Korea) Kim Gi-jung (South Korea) Kim Sa-rang	19–21, 15–21	(silver) Runner-up
2016	Indonesia Open	(China) Hong Wei	(South Korea) Lee Yong-dae (South Korea) Yoo Yeon-seong	21–13, 13–21, 16–21	(silver) Runner-up

BWF Super Series Finals tournament
BWF Super Series Premier tournament
BWF Super Series tournament

=== BWF Grand Prix ===
The BWF Grand Prix had two levels, the Grand Prix and Grand Prix Gold. It was a series of badminton tournaments sanctioned by the Badminton World Federation (BWF) and played between 2007 and 2017.

Men's doubles
Year	Tournament	Partner	Opponent	Score	Result
2010	German Open	(China) Zhang Nan	(Chinese Taipei) Chen Hung-ling (Chinese Taipei) Lin Yu-lang	17–21, 21–13, 21–15	(gold) Winner
2011	Macau Open	(China) Guo Zhendong	(South Korea) Ko Sung-hyun (South Korea) Yoo Yeon-seong	21–19, 21–19	(gold) Winner
2013	German Open	(China) Hong Wei	(China) Liu Xiaolong (China) Qiu Zihan	21–10, 21–14	(gold) Winner
2013	Swiss Open	(China) Hong Wei	(South Korea) Ko Sung-hyun (South Korea) Lee Yong-dae	21–14, 18–21, 21–14	(gold) Winner
2014	Swiss Open	(China) Hong Wei	(China) Fu Haifeng (China) Zhang Nan	22–20, 21–14	(gold) Winner
2015	Indonesian Masters	(China) Hong Wei	(Indonesia) Berry Angriawan (Indonesia) Rian Agung Saputro	11–21, 20–22	(silver) Runner-up
2017	Swiss Open	(China) Hong Wei	(China) Liu Cheng (China) Zhang Nan	13–21, 21–16, 21–15	(gold) Winner

Mixed doubles
Year	Tournament	Partner	Opponent	Score	Result
2014	Swiss Open	(China) Tang Jinhua	(England) Chris Adcock (England) Gabby Adcock	17–21, 13–21	(silver) Runner-up

BWF Grand Prix Gold tournament
BWF Grand Prix tournament

== Record against selected opponents ==
Men's doubles results with Guo Zhendong against Superseries Finals finalists, World Championships semifinalists, and Olympic quarterfinalists.

- (China) Cai Yun & Fu Haifeng 1–2
- (China) Liu Xiaolong & Qiu Zihan 2–0
- (Chinese Taipei) Fang Chieh-min & Lee Sheng-mu 2–0
- (Denmark) Mathias Boe & Carsten Mogensen 0–5
- (Denmark) Mads Conrad-Petersen & Jonas Rasmussen 3–1
- (Denmark) Mads Conrad-Petersen & Mads Pieler Kolding 1–0
- (Indonesia) Mohammad Ahsan & Bona Septano 4–1
- (Indonesia) Hendra Aprida Gunawan & Alvent Yulianto 0–2
- (Indonesia) Markis Kido & Hendra Setiawan 1–1
- (Indonesia) Angga Pratama & Rian Agung Saputro 2–1
- (Japan) Hiroyuki Endo & Kenichi Hayakawa 0–1
- (Japan) Hirokatsu Hashimoto & Noriyasu Hirata 4–0
- (Malaysia) Goh V Shem & Lim Khim Wah 0–1
- (Malaysia) Hoon Thien How & Tan Wee Kiong 0–1
- (Malaysia) Koo Kien Keat & Tan Boon Heong 0–1
- (Russia) Vladimir Ivanov & Ivan Sozonov 1–1
- (South Korea) Cho Gun-woo & Shin Baek-cheol 0–1
- (South Korea) Jung Jae-sung & Lee Yong-dae 2–1
- (South Korea) Ko Sung-hyun & Yoo Yeon-seong 2–1
- (Thailand) Bodin Isara & Maneepong Jongjit 2–0
- (United States) Howard Bach & Tony Gunawan 0–2
