= 2017 BWF World Championships =

Tournament details
- Dates: 21–27 August
- Edition: 23rd
- Level: International
- Venue: Emirates Arena
- Location: Glasgow, Scotland

The 2017 BWF World Championships of badminton were held from 21 to 27 August at the Emirates Arena in Glasgow, Scotland.

The venue can hold 6,000 spectators. When Glasgow hosted the event in 1997 it was held at the Scotstoun Centre.

== Host city selection ==
Glasgow originally submitted a bid for the 2017 Sudirman Cup but lost to Gold Coast. The Badminton World Federation awarded the World Championships to Glasgow after the event did not receive appropriate bids.

== Schedule ==
All times are local (UTC+1).

Date	Time	Round
21 August 2017	11:00	Round of 64
22 August 2017	11:00	Round of 64
22 August 2017	11:00	Round of 32
23 August 2017	11:00	Round of 32
24 August 2017	11:00	Round of 16
25 August 2017	10:00	Quarterfinals
26 August 2017	10:00	Semifinals
27 August 2017	13:00	Finals

== Medal summary ==
=== Medal table ===
* Host nation (Scotland)

Rank	Nation	Gold	Silver	Bronze	Total
1	China (CHN)	2	2	3	7
2	Japan (JPN)	1	1	2	4
3	Indonesia (INA)	1	1	0	2
4	Denmark (DEN)	1	0	1	2
5	India (IND)	0	1	1	2
6	England (ENG)	0	0	1	1
6	Hong Kong (HKG)	0	0	1	1
6	South Korea (KOR)	0	0	1	1
Totals (8 entries)		5	5	10	20

=== Medalists ===
Event	Gold	Silver	Bronze
Men's singles	Viktor Axelsen; Denmark	Lin Dan; China	Son Wan-ho; South Korea
Men's singles	Viktor Axelsen; Denmark	Lin Dan; China	Chen Long; China
Women's singles	Nozomi Okuhara; Japan	P. V. Sindhu; India	Chen Yufei; China
Women's singles	Nozomi Okuhara; Japan	P. V. Sindhu; India	Saina Nehwal; India
Men's doubles	China; Liu Cheng; Zhang Nan	Indonesia; Mohammad Ahsan; Rian Agung Saputro	Japan; Takeshi Kamura; Keigo Sonoda
Men's doubles	China; Liu Cheng; Zhang Nan	Indonesia; Mohammad Ahsan; Rian Agung Saputro	China; Chai Biao; Hong Wei
Women's doubles	China; Chen Qingchen; Jia Yifan	Japan; Yuki Fukushima; Sayaka Hirota	Japan; Misaki Matsutomo; Ayaka Takahashi
Women's doubles	China; Chen Qingchen; Jia Yifan	Japan; Yuki Fukushima; Sayaka Hirota	Denmark; Kamilla Rytter Juhl; Christinna Pedersen
Mixed doubles	Indonesia; Tontowi Ahmad; Liliyana Natsir	China; Zheng Siwei; Chen Qingchen	England; Chris Adcock; Gabby Adcock
Mixed doubles	Indonesia; Tontowi Ahmad; Liliyana Natsir	China; Zheng Siwei; Chen Qingchen	Hong Kong; Lee Chun Hei; Chau Hoi Wah
