= 2014 Singapore Super Series =

Tournament details
- Dates: 8 April 2014– 13 April 2014
- Edition: 65th
- Level: Super Series
- Total prize money: US$300,000
- Venue: Singapore Indoor Stadium
- Location: Kallang, Singapore

Champions
- Men's singles: (Indonesia) Simon Santoso
- Women's singles: (China) Wang Yihan
- Men's doubles: (China) Cai Yun (China) Lu Kai
- Women's doubles: (China) Bao Yixin (China) Tang Jinhua
- Mixed doubles: (Indonesia) Tontowi Ahmad (Indonesia) Liliyana Natsir

The 2014 Singapore Super Series was the fifth super series tournament of the 2014 BWF Super Series. The tournament took place in Singapore from 08–13 April 2014 with a total purse of $300,000.

== Men's singles ==
=== Seeds ===
1. (Malaysia) Lee Chong Wei
2. (Japan) Kenichi Tago
3. (Indonesia) Tommy Sugiarto (withdrew)
4. (Thailand) Boonsak Ponsana
5. (China) Du Pengyu
6. (South Korea) Shon Wan-ho
7. (Vietnam) Nguyễn Tiến Minh
8. (Japan) Kento Momota

=== Top half ===
First Round
1	(Malaysia) Lee C W	21	21
(Hong Kong) Wei N	17	15
PFQ	(Malaysia) Tan C S	13	11
(China) Chen YK	21	21
8	(Japan) K Momota	17	16
(Thailand) T Saensomboonsuk	21	21
(Hong Kong) Wong W K	16	21	24
(Denmark) V Axelsen	21	13	22
PFQ	(Malaysia) M R Mohmed Misbun	21	16	8
(Hong Kong) Hu Y	19	21	21
(India) A Pawar	10	15
(Indonesia) D H Rumbaka	21	21
7	(Vietnam) Nguyễn T M	21	17	21
(Chinese Taipei) Chou T-c	19	21	17
(Japan) T Ueda	21	15
(India) S Kidambi	23	21

Second Round
1	(Malaysia) Lee C W	21	21
(China) Chen YK	11	6
(Thailand) T Saensomboonsuk	21	18	21
(Hong Kong) Wong W K	14	21	14
(Hong Kong) Hu Y	21	21
(Indonesia) D H Rumbaka	11	15
7	(Vietnam) Nguyễn T M	21	15	8
(India) S Kidambi	18	21	21

Quarterfinals
1	(Malaysia) Lee C W	21	21
(Thailand) T Saensomboonsuk	8	14
(Hong Kong) Hu Y	21	14	19
(India) S Kidambi	17	21	21

Semifinals
1	(Malaysia) Lee C W	21	21
(India) S Kidambi	19	18

=== Bottom half ===
First Round
(China) Tian HW	14	17
Q4	(Indonesia) S Santoso	21	21
(Chinese Taipei) Hsu J-h	22	21
6	(South Korea) Shon W-h	20	15
(South Korea) Lee D-k	16	21	22
(India) P Kashyap	21	15	20
Q2	(Hong Kong) Chan Y K	17	21	17
PFQ	(China) Gao H	21	13	21
(India) Prannoy H. S.	21	14	21
Q1	(Thailand) T Sitthikom	17	21	11
(Japan) S Sasaki	17	15
5	(China) Du PY	21	21
Q3	(Malaysia) M A Abdul Latif	13	15
PFQ	(India) B Sai Praneeth	21	21
(Denmark) H-K Vittinghus	16	21	16
PFQ	(Singapore) D Wong	21	16	21

Second Round
Q4	(Indonesia) S Santoso	21	21
(Chinese Taipei) Hsu J-h	16	16
(South Korea) Lee D-k	21	8	21
PFQ	(China) Gao H	14	21	18
(India) Prannoy H. S.	17	21	12
5	(China) Du PY	21	18	21
PFQ	(India) B Sai Praneeth	24	21
PFQ	(Singapore) D Wong	22	19

Quarterfinals
Q4	(Indonesia) S Santoso	21	21
(South Korea) Lee D-k	18	15
5	(China) Du PY	21	21
PFQ	(India) B Sai Praneeth	15	15

Semifinals
Q4	(Indonesia) S Santoso	16	21	21
5	(China) Du PY	21	17	17

=== Finals ===
Semifinals
1	(Malaysia) Lee Chong Wei	21	21
(India) S Kidambi	19	18
Q4	(Indonesia) Simon Santoso	16	21	21
5	(China) Du Pengyu	21	17	17

Final
1	(Malaysia) Lee Chong Wei	15	10
Q4	(Indonesia) Simon Santoso	21	21

== Women's singles ==
=== Seeds ===
1. (China) Li Xuerui
2. (China) Wang Yihan
3. (Thailand) Ratchanok Intanon
4. (South Korea) Bae Yeon-ju
5. (South Korea) Sung Ji-hyun
6. (Chinese Taipei) Tai Tzu-ying
7. (India) Saina Nehwal
8. (India) P. V. Sindhu

=== Top half ===
First Round
1	(China) Li XR	21	21
(India) T Lad	6	11
(Austria) S Prutsch	15	13
(Japan) M Mitani	21	21
6	(Chinese Taipei) Tai T-y	21	23
(Hong Kong) Yip P Y	13	21
(Singapore) Chen JY	19	21	15
(Chinese Taipei) Pai H-m	21	17	21
4	(South Korea) Bae Y-j	21	19	21
(Thailand) N Jindapol	18	21	17
Q2	(Malaysia) L Cheah	15	12
Q3	(Vietnam) Vũ T T	21	21
5	(South Korea) Sung J-h	21	21
(Indonesia) L Fanetri	17	16
(Thailand) P Buranaprasertsuk	15	17
Q4	(Indonesia) A Firdasari	21	21

Second Round
1	(China) Li XR	17	21	21
(Japan) M Mitani	21	19	12
6	(Chinese Taipei) Tai T-y	21	21
(Chinese Taipei) Pai H-m	14	11
4	(South Korea) Bae Y-j	21	21
Q3	(Vietnam) Vũ T T	8	18
5	(South Korea) Sung J-h	21	18	21
Q4	(Indonesia) A Firdasari	17	21	12

Quarterfinals
1	(China) Li XR	21	21
6	(Chinese Taipei) Tai T-y	10	13
4	(South Korea) Bae Y-j	12	9
5	(South Korea) Sung J-h	21	21

Semifinals
1	(China) Li XR	21	21
5	(South Korea) Sung J-h	13	13

=== Bottom half ===
First Round
(Indonesia) B Manuputty	21	21	22
(China) Han L	16	23	24
(Japan) E Hirose	16	21	21
7	(India) S Nehwal	21	15	11
(Singapore) Gu J	21	15	14
(Japan) S Takahashi	16	21	21
(Malaysia) Tee J Y	13	13
3	(Thailand) R Intanon	21	21
(Japan) S Uchida	16	21	21
(India) A Pantawane	21	11	15
(Indonesia) M Wiranto	9	22	19
8	(India) P. V. Sindhu	21	20	21
(India) P. C. Thulasi	21	21
(New Zealand) A Rankin	13	16
Q1	(Malaysia) Yang L L	9	15
2	(China) Wang YH	21	21

Second Round
(China) Han L	21	21
(Japan) E Hirose	16	14
(Japan) S Takahashi	17	12
3	(Thailand) R Intanon	21	21
(Japan) S Uchida	17	21	16
8	(India) P. V. Sindhu	21	17	21
(India) P. C. Thulasi	19	7
2	(China) Wang YH	21	21

Quarterfinals
(China) Han L	21	21
3	(Thailand) R Intanon	14	12
8	(India) P. V. Sindhu	19	15
2	(China) Wang YH	21	21

Semifinals
(China) Han L	18	12
2	(China) Wang YH	21	21

=== Finals ===
Semifinals
1	(China) Li Xuerui	21	21
5	(South Korea) Sung Ji-hyun	13	13
(China) Han Li	18	12
2	(China) Wang Yihan	21	21

Final
1	(China) Li Xuerui	11	19
2	(China) Wang Yihan	21	21

== Men's doubles ==
=== Seeds ===
1. (Indonesia) Mohammad Ahsan / Hendra Setiawan
2. (Japan) Hiroyuki Endo / Kenichi Hayakawa
3. (Indonesia) Angga Pratama / Rian Agung Saputro
4. (Malaysia) Hoon Thien How / Tan Wee Kiong
5. (South Korea) Kim Sa-rang / Yoo Yeon-seong
6. (Chinese Taipei) Lee Sheng-mu / Tsai Chia-hsin
7. (Indonesia) Marcus Fernaldi Gideon / Markis Kido
8. (Japan) Takeshi Kamura / Keigo Sonoda

=== Top half ===
First Round
1	(Indonesia) M Ahsan (Indonesia) H Setiwan	21	21
Q4	(Singapore) A Chen (Singapore) R Gonansa	5	17
(India) A Francis (India) A Vishnu	21	16	22
(Chinese Taipei) Liang J-w (Chinese Taipei) Liao K-h	15	21	20
5	(South Korea) Kim S-r (South Korea) Yoo Y-s	21	26
(Malaysia) Goh V S (Malaysia) Lim K W	17	24
(Chinese Taipei) Chen H-l (Chinese Taipei) Lu C-p	21	21
(Indonesia) C Rusdianto (Indonesia) T Wardhana	15	12
3	(Indonesia) A Pratama (Indonesia) R A Saputro	21	21
(China) Kang J (China) Liu C	15	17
(Japan) H Hashimoto (Japan) N Hirata	14	21	18
(Indonesia) B Angriawan (Indonesia) R K Suwardi	21	15	21
8	(Japan) T Kamura (Japan) K Sonoda	21	21
Q1	(Hong Kong) Tang C M (Hong Kong) Law C H	7	11
(China) Cai Y (China) Lu K	22	21	21
(Malaysia) Ow Y H (Malaysia) Tan B H	24	19	18

Second Round
1	(Indonesia) M Ahsan (Indonesia) H Setiawan	21	24
(India) A Francis (India) A Vishnu	17	22
5	(South Korea) Kim S-r (South Korea) Yoo Y-s	21	21
(Chinese Taipei) Chen H-l (Chinese Taipei) Lu C-p	9	15
3	(Indonesia) A Pratama (Indonesia) R A Saputro	21	14	13
(Indonesia) B Angriawan (Indonesia) R K Suwardi	19	21	21
8	(Japan) T Kamura (Japan) K Sonoda	21	19
(China) Cai Y (China) Lu K	23	21

Quarterfinals
1	(Indonesia) M Ahsan (Indonesia) H Setiawan	15	21	19
5	(South Korea) Kim S-r (South Korea) Yoo Y-s	21	13	21
(Indonesia) B Angriawan (Indonesia) R K Suwardi	16	21	12
(China) Cai Y (China) Lu K	21	18	21

Semifinals
5	(South Korea) Kim S-r (South Korea) Yoo Y-s	19	16
(China) Cai Y (China) Lu K	21	21

=== Bottom half ===
First Round
(Malaysia) M Z A Latif (Malaysia) M F M Tazari	18	19
(New Zealand) K Dennerly-Minturn (New Zealand) O Leydon-Davis	21	21
PFQ	(Malaysia) M R A Latif (Malaysia) V I Mawan
6	(Chinese Taipei) Lee S-m (Chinese Taipei) Tsai C-h	w	/	o
(Thailand) M Jongjit (Thailand) N Phuangphuapet	21	21
Q3	(Singapore) D B Chrisnanta (Singapore) C Triyachart	14	18
(Indonesia) W Nayaka (Indonesia) A Yusuf	18	14
4	(Malaysia) Hoon T H (Malaysia) Tan W K	21	21
(Malaysia) Chow P C (Malaysia) Mak H C	21	21
Q2	(Chinese Taipei) Liao M-c (Chinese Taipei) Tseng M-h	17	19
(South Korea) Ko S-h (South Korea) Shin B-c	21	23
7	(Indonesia) M F Gideon (Indonesia) M Kido	12	21
(China) Chai B (China) Hong W	21	21
(Hong Kong) Chan Y L (Hong Kong) Lee C H	13	9
(Indonesia) F Kurniawan (Indonesia) B Septano	17	18
2	(Japan) H Endo (Japan) K Hayakawa	21	21

Second Round
(New Zealand) K Dennerly-Minturn (New Zealand) O Leydon-Davis	12	15
6	(Chinese Taipei) Lee S-m (Chinese Taipei) Tsai C-h	21	21
(Thailand) M Jongjit (Thailand) N Phuangphuapet	17	18
4	(Malaysia) Hoon T H (Malaysia) Tan W K	21	21
(Malaysia) Chow P C (Malaysia) Mak H C	17	18
(South Korea) Ko S-h (South Korea) Shin B-c	21	21
(China) Chai B (China) Hong W	21	10	21
2	(Japan) H Endo (Japan) K Hayakawa	14	21	19

Quarterfinals
6	(Chinese Taipei) Lee S-m (Chinese Taipei) Tsai C-h	21	21
4	(Malaysia) Hoon T H (Malaysia) Tan W K	16	14
(South Korea) Ko S-h (South Korea) Shin B-c	w	/	o
(China) Chai B (China) Hong W

Semifinals
6	(Chinese Taipei) Lee S-m (Chinese Taipei) Tsai C-h	22	18	21
(South Korea) Ko S-h (South Korea) Shin B-c	20	21	14

=== Finals ===
Semifinals
5	(South Korea) Kim Sa-rang (South Korea) Yoo Yeon-seong	19	16
(China) Cai Yun (China) Lu Kai	21	21
6	(Chinese Taipei) Lee Sheng-mu (Chinese Taipei) Tsai Chia-hsin	22	18	21
(South Korea) Ko Sung-hyun (South Korea) Shin Baek-cheol	20	21	14

Final
(China) Cai Yun (China) Lu Kai	21	21
6	(Chinese Taipei) Lee Sheng-mu (Chinese Taipei) Tsai Chia-hsin	19	14

== Women's doubles ==
=== Seeds ===
1. (Denmark) Christinna Pedersen / Kamilla Rytter Juhl
2. (China) Bao Yixin / Tang Jinhua
3. (Japan) Misaki Matsutomo / Ayaka Takahashi
4. (South Korea) Chang Ye-na / Kim So-young
5. (China) Ma Jin / Wang Xiaoli
6. (Indonesia) Pia Zebadiah Bernadet / Rizki Amelia Pradipta
7. (Japan) Reika Kakiiwa / Miyuki Maeda
8. (Indonesia) Nitya Krishinda Maheswari / Greysia Polii

=== Top half ===
First Round
(Malaysia) Lee M Y (Malaysia) Lim Y L	21	21
(Singapore) Tan W H (Singapore) D Yuliana	12	11
7	(Japan) R Kakiiwa (Japan) M Maeda	21	21
(Thailand) D Aroonkesorn (Thailand) K Voravichitchaikul	15	11
(Hong Kong) Chan T K (Hong Kong) Tse Y S	18	19
(Indonesia) S P Irawati (Indonesia) V Marissa	21	21
(New Zealand) A Rankin (New Zealand) M Stapleton	7	7
(Hong Kong) Chau H W (Hong Kong) Poon L Y	21	21
6	(Indonesia) P Z Bernadet (Indonesia) R A Pradipta	17	21	19
(China) Xia H (China) Zhong QX	21	15	21
(Indonesia) S R Andini (Indonesia) T R Nuraidah	21	21
(Singapore) Fu MT (Singapore) V Neo	17	16

Second Round
1	(Denmark) C Pedersen (Denmark) K Rytter Juhl	21	21
(Malaysia) Lee M Y (Malaysia) Lim Y L	19	15
7	(Japan) R Kakiiwa (Japan) M Maeda	21	18	21
(Indonesia) S P Irawati (Indonesia) V Marissa	16	21	17
3	(Japan) M Matsutomo (Japan) A Takahashi	21	21
(Hong Kong) Chau H W (Hong Kong) Poon L Y	13	13
(China) Xia H (China) Zhong QX	24	18	20
(Indonesia) S R Andini (Indonesia) T R Nuraidah	22	21	22

Quarterfinals
1	(Denmark) C Pedersen (Denmark) K Rytter Juhl	21	21
7	(Japan) R Kakiiwa (Japan) M Maeda	15	5
3	(Japan) M Matsutomo (Japan) A Takahashi	30	18	22
(Indonesia) S R Andini (Indonesia) T R Nuraidah	29	21	20

Semifinals
1	(Denmark) C Pedersen (Denmark) K Rytter Juhl	11	21	21
3	(Japan) M Matsutomo (Japan) A Takahashi	21	15	14

=== Bottom half ===
First Round
(China) Luo Y (China) Luo Y	21	21
(India) J Gutta (India) A Ponnappa	15	16
(South Korea) Jung K-e (South Korea) Kim H-n	17	21	21
5	(China) Ma J (China) Wang XL	21	17	17
(South Korea) Go A-r (South Korea) Yoo H-w	21	21
(Indonesia) D Fitriani (Indonesia) N Melati	15	15
(Singapore) S M Sari (Singapore) Yao L	21	21
4	(South Korea) Chang Y-n (South Korea) Kim S-y	19	18
(Indonesia) A S Awanda (Indonesia) D D Haris	16	21	15
(South Korea) Lee S-h (South Korea) Shin S-c	21	14	21
(Japan) M Aratama (Japan) M Taruno	19	6
8	(Indonesia) N K Maheswari (Indonesia) G Polii	21	21
(Chinese Taipei) Cheng W-h (Chinese Taipei) Hsieh P-c	21	21
(Malaysia) Ng H E (Malaysia) Ng H L	16	19

Second Round
(China) Luo Y (China) Luo Yu	21	21
(South Korea) Jung K-e (South Korea) Kim H-n	12	14
(South Korea) Go A-r (South Korea) Yoo H-w	21	21
(Singapore) S M Sari (Singapore) Yao L	9	11
(South Korea) Lee S-h (South Korea) Shin S-c	16	19
8	(Indonesia) N K Maheswari (Indonesia) G Polii	21	21
(Chinese Taipei) Cheng W-h (Chinese Taipei) Hsieh P-c	23	19
2	(China) Bao YX (China) Tang JH	25	21

Quarterfinals
(China) Luo Y (China) Luo Y	21	21
(South Korea) Go A-r (South Korea) Yoo H-w	12	13
8	(Indonesia) N K Maheswari (Indonesia) G Polii	20	20
2	(China) Bao YX (China) Tang JH	22	22

Semifinals
(China) Luo Y (China) Luo Y
2	(China) Bao YX (China) Tang JH	w	/	o

=== Finals ===
Semifinals
1	(Denmark) Christinna Pedersen (Denmark) Kamilla Rytter Juhl	11	21	21
3	(Japan) Misaki Matsutomo (Japan) Ayaka Takahashi	21	15	14
(China) Luo Ying (China) Luo Yu
2	(China) Bao Yixin (China) Tang Jinhua	w	/	o

Final
1	(Denmark) Christinna Pedersen (Denmark) Kamilla Rytter Juhl	21	19	15
2	(China) Bao Yixin (China) Tang Jinhua	14	21	21

== Mixed doubles ==
=== Seeds ===
1. (Indonesia) Tontowi Ahmad / Liliyana Natsir
2. (China) Xu Chen / Ma Jin
3. (South Korea) Ko Sung-hyun / Kim Ha-na
4. (Malaysia) Chan Peng Soon / Goh Liu Ying
5. (Thailand) Sudket Prapakamol / Saralee Thungthongkam
6. (Indonesia) Markis Kido / Pia Zebadiah Bernadet
7. (Hong Kong) Lee Chun Hei / Chau Hoi Wah
8. (Indonesia) Riky Widianto / Richi Puspita Dili

=== Top half ===
First Round
1	(Indonesia) T Ahmad (Indonesia) L Natsir	21	21
Q2	(Singapore) C Triyachart (Singapore) Yao L	12	10
(Japan) K Hayakawa (Japan) M Matsutomo	21	21
(Malaysia) Tan A Q (Malaysia) Lim Y L	13	9
7	(Hong Kong) Lee C H (Hong Kong) Chau H W	13	14
(Denmark) A Kristiansen (Denmark) J Houmann	21	21
Q1	(Indonesia) M Rijal (Indonesia) V Marissa	18	21	19
(Chinese Taipei) Chen H-l (Chinese Taipei) Cheng W-h	21	19	21
4	(Malaysia) Chan P S (Malaysia) Goh L Y	21	21
(South Korea) Shin B-c (South Korea) Eom H-w	17	19
(China) Liu C (China) Bao YX	21	16	22
(Indonesia) F Kurniawan (Indonesia) S P Irawati	17	21	20
5	(Thailand) S Prapakamol (Thailand) S Thungthongkam	21	21
(Indonesia) T Wardhana (Indonesia) A P L Variella	15	12
(India) T Kona (India) A Ponnappa	15	10
(Singapore) D B Chrisnanta (Singapore) V Neo	21	21

Second Round
1	(Indonesia) T Ahmad (Indonesia) L Natsir	21	21
(Japan) K Hayakawa (Japan) M Matsutomo	12	17
(Denmark) A Kristiansen (Denmark) J Houmann	21	22
(Chinese Taipei) Chen H-l (Chinese Taipei) Cheng W-h	16	20
4	(Malaysia) Chan P S (Malaysia) Goh L Y	17	21	12
(China) Liu C (China) Bao YX	21	12	21
5	(Thailand) S Prapakamol (Thailand) S Thungthongkam	12	18
(Singapore) D B Chrisnanta (Singapore) V Neo	21	21

Quarterfinals
1	(Indonesia) T Ahmad (Indonesia) L Natsir	21	21
(Denmark) A Kristiansen (Denmark) J Houmann	8	17
(China) Liu C (China) Bao YX	21	22
(Singapore) D B Chrisnanta (Singapore) V Neo	12	20

Semifinals
1	(Indonesia) T Ahmad (Indonesia) L Natsir	17	21	21
(China) Liu C (China) Bao YX	21	11	19

=== Bottom half ===
First Round
(Indonesia) M F Gideon (Indonesia) R A Pradipta	23	21
(India) A Vishnu (India) A Balan	21	17
(South Korea) Yoo Y-s (South Korea) Chang Y-n	21	21
6	(Indonesia) M Kido (Indonesia) P Z Bernadet	19	17
(New Zealand) O Leydon-Davis (New Zealand) S Leydon-Davis	10	10
(Japan) H Hashimoto (Japan) M Maeda	21	21
(Hong Kong) Chan Y L (Hong Kong) Tse Y S	13	21	16
3	(South Korea) Ko S-h (South Korea) Kim H-n	21	15	21
(Malaysia) Ong J G (Malaysia) Lee M Y	21	21
PFQ	(Malaysia) M A H Nurizwan (Malaysia) S Saniru	11	10
Q4	(Singapore) T Hee (Singapore) Fu MT	11	14
8	(Indonesia) R Widianto (Indonesia) R P Dili	21	21
(Thailand) M Jongjit (Thailand) S Taerattanachai	21	17	21
(China) Lu K (China) Huang YQ	16	21	18
Q3	(Denmark) S Gravholt (Denmark) K Rytter Juhl	8	22	14
2	(China) Xu C (China) Ma J	21	20	21

Second Round
(Indonesia) M F Gideon (Indonesia) R A Pradipta	13	14
(South Korea) Yoo Y-s (South Korea) Chang Y-n	21	21
(Japan) H Hashimoto (Japan) M Maeda	21	19	14
3	(South Korea) Ko S-h (South Korea) Kim H-n	18	21	21
(Malaysia) Ong J G (Malaysia) Lee M Y	16	15
8	(Indonesia) R Widianto (Indonesia) R P Dili	21	21
(Thailand) M Jongjit (Thailand) S Taerattanachai	17	17
2	(China) Xu C (China) Ma J	21	21

Quarterfinals
(South Korea) Yoo Y-s (South Korea) Chang Y-n	21	16	15
3	(South Korea) Ko S-h (South Korea) Kim H-n	18	21	21
8	(Indonesia) R Widianto (Indonesia) R P Dili	w	/	o
2	(China) Xu C (China) Ma J

Semifinals
3	(South Korea) Ko S-h (South Korea) Kim H-n	22	17	16
8	(Indonesia) R Widianto (Indonesia) R P Dili	20	21	21

=== Finals ===
Semifinals
1	(Indonesia) Tontowi Ahmad (Indonesia) Liliyana Natsir	17	21	21
(China) Liu Cheng (China) Bao Yixin	21	11	19
3	(South Korea) Ko Sung-hyun (South Korea) Kim Ha-na	22	17	16
8	(Indonesia) Riky Widianto (Indonesia) Richi Puspita Dili	20	21	21

Final
1	(Indonesia) Tontowi Ahmad (Indonesia) Liliyana Natsir	21	22
8	(Indonesia) Riky Widianto (Indonesia) Richi Puspita Dili	15	20

Preceded by 2013 Singapore Super Series	Singapore Super Series	Succeeded by 2015 Singapore Super Series
Preceded by 2014 India Super Series	BWF Super Series; 2014 season	Succeeded by 2014 Japan Super Series
