= 2015 Syed Modi International Grand Prix Gold =

Tournament details
- Dates: January 20, 2015 - January 25, 2015
- Level: Grand Prix Gold
- Total prize money: US$120,000
- Venue: Babu Banarasi Das Indoor Stadium
- Location: Lucknow, India

Champions
- Men's singles: (India) Kashyap Parupalli
- Women's singles: (India) Saina Nehwal
- Men's doubles: (Denmark) Mathias Boe (Denmark) Carsten Mogensen
- Women's doubles: (Malaysia) Amelia Alicia Anscelly (Malaysia) Soong Fie Cho
- Mixed doubles: (Indonesia) Riky Widianto (Indonesia) Richi Puspita Dili

The 2015 Syed Modi International Grand Prix Gold was the second grand prix gold and grand prix tournament of the 2015 BWF Grand Prix Gold and Grand Prix. The tournament was held in Babu Banarasi Das Indoor Stadium, Lucknow, India from 20 January until 25 January 2015 and had a total purse of $120,000.

== Men's singles ==
=== Seeds ===
1. (India) Srikanth Kidambi (final)
2. (Denmark) Viktor Axelsen (semi-final)
3. (India) Kashyap Parupalli (champion)
4. (India) Prannoy Kumar (semi-final)
5. (Malaysia) Chong Wei Feng (quarter-final)
6. (India) Sai Praneeth Bhamidipati (quarter-final)
7. (India) Sourabh Varma (third round)
8. (India) Rajah Menuri Venkata Gurusaidutt (quarter-final)
9. (India) Anand Pawar (withdrew)
10. (Singapore) Derek Wong Zi Liang (quarter-final)
11. (Israel) Misha Zilberman (third round)
12. (Malaysia) Zulfadli Zulkiffli (third round)
13. (Russia) Vladimir Ivanov (third round)
14. (India) Ajay Jayaram (second round)
15. (Thailand) Suppanyu Avihingsanon (third round)
16. (India) Arvind Bhat (third round)

=== Finals ===
Quarterfinals
1	(India) Srikanth Kidambi	17	21	0
5	(Malaysia) Chong Wei Feng	21	12	0^{r}
4	(India) Prannoy Kumar	21	21
8	(India) R.M.V. Gurusaidutt	18	19
10	(Singapore) Derek Wong Zi Liang	18	9
3	(India) Kashyap Parupalli	21	21
6	(India) Sai Praneeth	21	17	16
2	(Denmark) Viktor Axelsen	15	21	21

Semifinals
1	(India) Srikanth Kidambi	12	21	21
4	(India) Prannoy Kumar	21	12	14
3	(India) Kashyap Parupalli	18	22	21
2	(Denmark) Viktor Axelsen	21	20	7

Final
1	(India) Srikanth Kidambi	21	21
3	(India) Kashyap Parupalli	23	23

=== Top half ===
==== Section 1 ====
First Round
1	(India) S Kidambi	21	21
(India) S Jaiswal	14	13
(India) M Gupta	12	9
(Malaysia) Tan KM	21	21
14	(India) A Jayaram	21	21
(India) K. A Kumar	3	7
(India) M Behal	14	2
(Malaysia) I Zainuddin	21	21

Second Round
1	(India) S Kidambi	18	21	22
(Malaysia) Tan KM	21	13	20
14	(India) A Jayaram	21	0^{r}
(Malaysia) I Zainuddin	23	0

Third Round
1	(India) S Kidambi	22	20	21
(Malaysia) I Zainuddin	20	22	11

==== Section 2 ====
First Round
5	(Malaysia) Chong WF	21	21
(India) A Sharma	9	11
(India) S Thakur	21	21
(Nepal) R Tamang	13	18
16	(India) A Bhat	21	21
Q4	(India) S Jakhar	15	8
(India) S Verma	21	21
(Malaysia) Goh SH	16	16

Second Round
5	(Malaysia) Chong WF	21	21
(India) S Thakur	13	12
16	(India) A Bhat	21	24
(India) S Verma	19	22

Third Round
5	(Malaysia) Chong WF	21	21
16	(India) A Bhat	6	11

==== Section 3 ====
First Round
4	(India) P Kumar	21	21
(India) O Bansal	17	13
(India) S Nandaluri	21	21
(Nepal) D Dhami	4	11
13	(Russia) V Ivanov	22	19	21
(India) A Prakash	20	21	8
Q6	(India) T Laa
(India) K Dharmamer	wo

Second Round
4	(India) P Kumar	21	21
(India) S Nandaluri	15	13
13	(Russia) V Ivanov	21	21
Q6	(India) T Laa	17	17

Third Round
4	(India) P Kumar	21	5
13	(Russia) V Ivanov	12	2^{r}

==== Section 4 ====
First Round
8	(India) R.M.V.Gurusaidutt	21	17	21
(India) P Joshi	17	21	13
(Malaysia) L Daren	21	21
(India) A Joshi	18	15
PFQ	(India) A Singh	21	21
Q2	(India) L Kumar	15	15
(India) M Kamat	8	17
(Thailand) S Thammasin	21	21

Second Round
8	(India) R.M.V.Gurusaidutt	21	21
(Malaysia) L Daren	14	15
PFQ	(India) A Singh	11	16
(Thailand) S Thammasin	21	21

Third Round
8	(India) R.M.V.Gurusaidutt	21	21
(Thailand) S Thammasin	16	19

=== Bottom half ===
==== Section 5 ====
First Round
Q1	(India) S Malik	21	21
(India) S Rawat	19	15
(India) K Chahal	13	12
10	(Singapore) D Wong	21	21
(India) H Dani	21	21
Q3	(India) V K Korukonda	14	13
(Nepal) B Shrestha	8	16
7	(India) S Varma	21	21

Second Round
Q1	(India) S Malik	7	8
10	(Singapore) D Wong	21	21
(India) H Dani	10	10
7	(India) S Varma	21	21

Third Round
10	(Singapore) D Wong	16	21	21
7	(India) S Varma	21	17	16

==== Section 6 ====
First Round
Q8	(India) R Joon	21	24	18
(India) V Saini	15	26	21
(India) D Khatri	5	13
11	(Israel) M Zilberman	21	21
Q7	(India) A Chhikara	21	22
(India) U Arora	19	20
(India) S Dey	11	20
3	(India) K Parupalli	21	22

Second Round
(India) V Saini	10	15
11	(Israel) M Zilberman	21	21
Q7	(India) A Chhikara	7	14
3	(India) K Parupalli	21	21

Third Round
11	(Israel) M Zilberman	16	12^{r}
3	(India) K Parupalli	21	20

==== Section 7 ====
First Round
Q5	(India) H Saroha	21	11	17
(India) A Yelegar	18	21	21
(India) C Anand	0^{r}
15	(Thailand) S Avihingsanon	1
(Malaysia) Zi Zulkiffli	14	15
(India) G Venkat	21	21
(India) P S Chouhan	8	12
6	(India) S Praneeth	21	21

Second Round
(India) A Yelegar	6	10
15	(Thailand) S Avihingsanon	21	21
(India) G Venkat	14	10
6	(India) S Praneeth	21	21

Third Round
15	(Thailand) S Avihingsanon	16	26	13
6	(India) S Praneeth	21	24	21

==== Section 8 ====
First Round
(India) S Kapoor	18	21	21
(Malaysia) Zh Zulkiffli	21	19	10
(India) A K A Kumar	4	8
12	(Malaysia) Zf Zulkiffli	21	21
(India) N Vashist	21	21
PFQ	(India) K Kanzarkar	13	13
(India) A Mahajan	17	6
2	(Denmark) V Axelsen	21	21

Second Round
(India) S Kapoor	17	10
12	(Malaysia) Zf Zulkiffli	21	21
(India) N Vashist	2	13
2	(Denmark) V Axelsen	21	21

Third Round
12	(Malaysia) Zf Zulkiffli	13	16
2	(Denmark) V Axelsen	21	21

== Women's singles ==
=== Seeds ===
1. (India) Saina Nehwal (champion)
2. (Spain) Carolina Marín (final)
3. (India) Pusarla Venkata Sindhu (semi-final)
4. (Thailand) Nichaon Jindapon (semi-final)
5. (Spain) Beatriz Corrales (second round)
6. (Thailand) Porntip Buranaprasertsuk (quarter-final)
7. (Malaysia) Tee Jing Yi (withdrew)
8. (India) Puthenpurayil Chandrika Thulasi (quarter-final)

=== Finals ===
Semifinals
1	(India) Saina Nehwal	21	21
4	(Thailand) Nichaon Jindapon	10	16
3	(India) Pusarla Venkata Sindhu	13	13
2	(Spain) Carolina Marín	21	21

Final
1	(India) Saina Nehwal	19	25	21
2	(Spain) Carolina Marín	21	23	16

=== Top half ===
==== Section 1 ====
First Round
1	(India) S Nehwal	21	21
(Malaysia) Lim YF	17	12
Q2	(India) R Mukherjee	7	16
(India) R Das	21	21
5	(Spain) B Corrales	21	21
(India) J Nashier	9	10
(Slovakia) J Ciznarova	10	12
(India) A Pantawane	21	21

Second Round
1	(India) S Nehwal	21	21
(India) R Das	15	9
5	(Spain) B Corrales	20	20
(India) A Pantawane	22	22

Quarterfinals
1	(India) S Nehwal	21	21
(India) A Pantawane	18	17

==== Section 2 ====
First Round
4	(Thailand) N Jindapon	21	9
Q4	(India) Y Sharma	4	0^{r}
(India) M Dhainje	17	15
(Malaysia) Yang LL	21	21
8	(India) P C Thulasi	21	21
PFQ	(India) R Nikam	5	8
Q3	(India) L Dahiya	13	14
(Russia) E Dimova	21	21

Second Round
4	(Thailand) N Jindapon	21	21
(Malaysia) Yang LL	10	11
8	(India) P C Thulasi	21	21
(Russia) E Dimova	7	15

Quarterfinals
4	(Thailand) N Jindapon	21	20	21
8	(India) P C Thulasi	16	22	12

=== Bottom half ===
==== Section 3 ====
First Round
(India) N Pandit	9	15
(Malaysia) Lim CS	21	21
(Italy) J Cicognini	11	8
6	(Thailand) P Buranaprasertsuk	21	21
(Singapore) Chen JY	21	21
(India) S Mundada	7	14
Q1	(India) E Kalia	6	12
3	(India) P V Sindhu	21	21

Second Round
(Malaysia) Lim CS	9	13
6	(Thailand) P Buranaprasertsuk	21	21
(Singapore) Chen JY	18	14
3	(India) P V Sindhu	21	21

Quarterfinals
6	(Thailand) P Buranaprasertsuk	21	11	14
3	(India) P V Sindhu	8	21	21

==== Section 4 ====
First Round
(Thailand) P Chochuwong	21	21	21
(India) S Rane	23	15	8
(India) J Dewangan	7	12
PFQ	(India) R Raje	21	21
(Russia) A Astrakhantseva	9	1
(India) T Lad	21	21
(India) R Gadde	9	10
2	(Spain) C Marín	21	21

Second Round
(Thailand) P Chochuwong	21	21
PFQ	(India) R Raje	7	12
(India) T Lad	23	19	6
2	(Spain) C Marín	21	21	21

Quarterfinals
(Thailand) P Chochuwong	11	13
2	(Spain) C Marín	21	21

== Men's doubles ==
=== Seeds ===
1. (Denmark) Mathias Boe / Carsten Mogensen (champion)
2. (Denmark) Mads Conrad-Petersen / Mads Pieler Kolding (quarter-final)
3. (Singapore) Danny Bawa Chrisnanta / Chayut Triyachart (second round)
4. (Russia) Vladimir Ivanov / Ivan Sozonov (final)
5. (India) Manu Attri / Sumeeth Reddy Buss (semi-final)
6. (India) Pranav Chopra / Akshay Dewalkar (semi-final)
7. (Thailand) Wannawat Ampunsuwan / Patiphat Chalardchaleam (withdrew)
8. (Malaysia) Hoon Thien How / Tan Boon Heong (withdrew)

=== Finals ===
Semifinals
1	(Denmark) Mathias Boe (Denmark) Carsten Mogensen	21	21
6	(India) Pranav Chopra (India) Akshay Dewalkar	10	13
4	(Russia) Vladimir Ivanov (Russia) Ivan Sozonov	21	21
5	(India) Manu Attri (India) Sumeeth Reddy Buss	12	18

Final
1	(Denmark) Mathias Boe (Denmark) Carsten Mogensen	21	22
4	(Russia) Vladimir Ivanov (Russia) Ivan Sozonov	9	20

=== Top half ===
==== Section 1 ====
First Round
1	(Denmark) M Boe (Denmark) C Mogensen	21	21
(India) V Chawat (India) R Rathore	7	12
(India) A Francis (India) A Vishnu	21	21
Q4	(India) K Chaudhary (India) C Tripathi	13	10
PFQ	(India) P Chouhan (India) M Gupta	9	15
(India) A George (India) H Babu	21	21
Q3	(India) S Kapoor (India) D Khatri	21	21
(India) G Prasad (India) V Prasad	19	17

Second Round
1	(Denmark) M Boe (Denmark) C Mogensen	21	21
(India) A Francis (India) A Vishnu	14	13
(India) A George (India) H Babu	19	21	21
Q3	(India) S Kapoor (India) D Khatri	21	8	16

Quarterfinals
1	(Denmark) M Boe (Denmark) C Mogensen	21	21
(India) A George (India) H Babu	13	8

==== Section 2 ====
First Round
3	(Singapore) D Chrisnanta (Singapore) C Triyachart	21	19	21
(India) S Ramchandran (India) S Shukla	17	21	18
(Thailand) K Ketlen (Thailand) D Puavaranukroh	21	21
(India) S Bandooni (India) V Singh	19	13
6	(India) P Chopra (India) A Dewalkar	21	21
(Nepal) B Shrestha (Nepal) R Tamang	11	9
(India) A Raju (India) G Venkat	21	21
Q1	(India) J James (India) V K Korukonda	15	11

Second Round
3	(Singapore) D Chrisnanta (Singapore) C Triyachart	wo
(Thailand) K Ketlen (Thailand) D Puavaranukroh
6	(India) P Chopra (India) A Dewalkar	21	21
(India) A Raju (India) G Venkat	14	14

Quarterfinals
(Thailand) K Ketlen (Thailand) D Puavaranukroh	16	21	15
6	(India) P Chopra (India) A Dewalkar	21	19	21

=== Bottom half ===
==== Section 3 ====
First Round
(Malaysia) Zf Zulkiffli (Malaysia) Zh Zulkiffli	21	18	16
(India) N Kidambi (India) A Malgari	12	21	21
(India) A Chhikara (India) K Singh	23	21
PFQ	(India) J.B.S. Vidyadhar (India) S Nandaluri	21	15
(India) G Raju (India) S Sharma	21	21
(Bangladesh) M Rahman (Bangladesh) U Saif	10	7
(Malaysia) Lim KW (Malaysia) Ow YH	18	13
4	(Russia) V Ivanov (Russia) I Sozonov	21	21

Second Round
(India) N Kidambi (India) A Malgari	21	21
(India) A Chhikara (India) K Singh	13	15
(India) G Raju (India) S Sharma	12	13
4	(Russia) V Ivanov (Russia) I Sozonov	21	21

Quarterfinals
(India) N Kidambi (India) A Malgari	9	14
4	(Russia) V Ivanov (Russia) I Sozonov	21	21

==== Section 4 ====
First Round
Q2	(India) U Arora (India) T Gill	14	16
(India) T Kona (India) S Ravuri	21	21
(Malaysia) Goh VS (Malaysia) Tan WK	17	19
5	(India) M Attri (India) S Buss	21	21
(Indonesia) Y Dasuki (Indonesia) D Indrianto	21	21
(India) S. Sanjeeth (India) J Yadav	14	14
(England) A Ellis (England) P Mills	11	19
2	(Denmark) M Conrad-Petersen (Denmark) M Pieler Kolding	21	21

Second Round
(India) T Kona (India) S Ravuri	14	14
5	(India) M Attri (India) S Buss	21	21
(Indonesia) Y Dasuki (Indonesia) D Indrianto	11	12
2	(Denmark) M Conrad-Petersen (Denmark) M Pieler Kolding	21	21

Quarterfinals
5	(India) M Attri (India) S Buss	21	4	24
2	(Denmark) M Conrad-Petersen (Denmark) M Pieler Kolding	18	21	22

== Women's doubles ==
=== Seeds ===
1. (Malaysia) Vivian Hoo Kah Mun / Woon Khe Wei (final)
2. (India) Jwala Gutta / Ashwini Ponnappa (semi-final)
3. (Thailand) Puttita Supajirakul / Sapsiree Taerattanachai (semi-final)
4. (Malaysia) Amelia Alicia Anscelly / Soong Fie Cho (champion)

=== Finals ===
Semifinals
1	(Malaysia) Vivian Hoo Kah Mun (Malaysia) Woon Khe Wei	12	21	21
3	(Thailand) Puttita Supajirakul (Thailand) Sapsiree Taerattanachai	21	16	13
4	(Malaysia) Amelia Alicia Anscelly (Malaysia) Soong Fie Cho	21	19	21
2	(India) Jwala Gutta (India) Ashwini Ponnappa	16	21	13

Final
1	(Malaysia) Vivian Hoo Kah Mun (Malaysia) Woon Khe Wei	20	15
4	(Malaysia) Amelia Alicia Anscelly (Malaysia) Soong Fie Cho	22	21

=== Top half ===
==== Section 1 ====
First Round
1	(Malaysia) V Hoo (Malaysia) Woon KW
BYE
(India) P Naqvi (India) S Sharma
BYE
WDN	(India) P Gadre (India) S Reddy
BYE
(India) S Ghorpade (India) A Sunil	21	21
(India) S Chhabra (India) E Kalia	13	16

Second Round
1	(Malaysia) V Hoo (Malaysia) Woon KW	21	21
(India) P Naqvi (India) S Sharma	7	10
BYE
(India) S Ghorpade (India) A Sunil

Quarterfinals
1	(Malaysia) V Hoo (Malaysia) Woon KW	21	21
(India) S Ghorpade (India) A Sunil	12	16

==== Section 2 ====
First Round
3	(Thailand) P Supajirakul (Thailand) S Taerattanachai
BYE
(India) D Gautam (India) R Sahdev
BYE
(India) T Dahiya (India) M Singh
BYE
(India) D Nair (India) M Sahdev	16	15
(Singapore) V Neo (Singapore) S Sari	21	21

Second Round
3	(Thailand) P Supajirakul (Thailand) S Taerattanachai	21	21
(India) D Gautam (India) R Sahdev	3	5
(India) T Dahiya (India) M Singh	2	6
(Singapore) V Neo (Singapore) S Sari	21	21

Quarterfinals
3	(Thailand) P Supajirakul (Thailand) S Taerattanachai	21	20	21
(Singapore) V Neo (Singapore) S Sari	14	22	17

=== Bottom half ===
==== Section 3 ====
First Round
(Malaysia) Lim YL (Malaysia) Lee MY
(India) K Das (India) Y Sharma	wo
BYE
(India) L Dahiya (India) S Panchal
(India) S Kalyani (India) R Mukherjee	21	23
(India) Ja Nashier (India) Jy Nashier	15	21
BYE
4	(Malaysia) A Anscelly (Malaysia) Soong FC

Second Round
(Malaysia) Lim YL (Malaysia) Lee MY	21	21
(India) L Dahiya (India) S Panchal	1	5
(India) S Kalyani (India) R Mukherjee	10	7
4	(Malaysia) A Anscelly (Malaysia) Soong FC	21	21

Quarterfinals
(Malaysia) Lim YL (Malaysia) Lee MY	15	13
4	(Malaysia) A Anscelly (Malaysia) Soong FC	21	21

==== Section 4 ====
First Round
(India) J Rachapalli (India) L Rachapalli	21	19	21
(India) J Dewangan (India) S Nagarkoti	18	21	10
BYE
(India) P Rai (India) V Pramada
BYE
(India) J. Meghana (India) M Kukkapalli
BYE
2	(India) J Gutta (India) A Ponnappa

Second Round
(India) J Rachapalli (India) L Rachapalli	21	21
(India) P Rai (India) V Pramada	13	12
(India) J. Meghana (India) M Kukkapalli	15	11
2	(India) J Gutta (India) A Ponnappa	21	21

Quarterfinals
(India) J Rachapalli (India) L Rachapalli	6	5
2	(India) J Gutta (India) A Ponnappa	21	21

== Mixed doubles ==
=== Seeds ===
1. (Indonesia) Riky Widianto / Richi Puspita Dili (champion)
2. (Singapore) Danny Bawa Chrisnanta / Vanessa Neo Yu Yan (second round)
3. (Russia) Evgenij Dremin / Evgenia Dimova (semi-final)
4. (Malaysia) Chan Peng Soon / Lai Pei Jing (semi-final)
5. (India) Akshay Dewalkar / Pradnya Gadre (withdrew)
6. (India) Arun Vishnu / Aparna Balan (withdrew)
7. (Malaysia) Tan Aik Quan / Lee Meng Yean (quarter-final)
8. (Malaysia) Wong Fai Yin / Chow Mei Kuan (quarter-final)

=== Finals ===
Semifinals
1	(Indonesia) Riky Widianto (Indonesia) Richi Puspita Dili	21	21
4	(Malaysia) Chan Peng Soon (Malaysia) Lai Pei Jing	16	12
3	(Russia) Evgenij Dremin (Russia) Evgenia Dimova	22	19
(India) Manu Attri (India) Maneesha Kukkapalli	24	21

Final
1	(Indonesia) Riky Widianto (Indonesia) Richi Puspita Dili	21	21
(India) Manu Attri (India) Maneesha Kukkapalli	17	17

=== Top half ===
==== Section 1 ====
First Round
1	(Indonesia) R Widianto (Indonesia) R Dili	21	21
(India) T Kona (India) S Reddy	18	14
Q4	BYE
(India) K Sharma (India) R Vinayak
8	(Malaysia) Wong FY (Malaysia) Chow MK
(India) J James (India) K Das	wo
(India) S V Kumar (India) R Mukherjee	21	21
PFQ	(Russia) K Romanuk (Russia) A Astrakhantseva	14	6

Second Round
1	(Indonesia) R Widianto (Indonesia) R Dili	21	21
(India) K Sharma (India) R Vinayak	3	4
8	(Malaysia) Wong FY (Malaysia) Chow MK	21	21
(India) S V Kumar (India) R Mukherjee	19	9

Quarterfinals
1	(Indonesia) R Widianto (Indonesia) R Dili	17	21	21
8	(Malaysia) Wong FY (Malaysia) Chow MK	21	18	17

==== Section 2 ====
First Round
4	(Malaysia) Chan PS (Malaysia) Lai PJ	21	21
(India) S Ramchandran (India) J. Meghana	12	7
PFQ	(India) U Arora (India) M Sahdev	21	17	21
(India) G Kalia (India) E Kalia	14	21	12
PFQ	(India) K. A Kumar (India) S Nagarkoti
Q1	BYE
(India) S Sharma (India) S Chhabra	14	16
(Singapore) C Triyachart (Singapore) S Sari	21	21

Second Round
4	(Malaysia) Chan PS (Malaysia) Lai PJ	21	21
PFQ	(India) U Arora (India) M Sahdev	12	8
PFQ	(India) K. A Kumar (India) S Nagarkoti	9	10
(Singapore) C Triyachart (Singapore) S Sari	21	21

Quarterfinals
4	(Malaysia) Chan PS (Malaysia) Lai PJ	21	21
(Singapore) C Triyachart (Singapore) S Sari	17	17

=== Bottom half ===
==== Section 3 ====
First Round
Q2	(India) G Rao (India) S Kalyani	21	21
(India) D Chaudhry (India) R Nikam	13	17
PFQ	(India) G Malhan (India) M Singh
6	(India) A Vishnu (India) A Balan	w/o
(Russia) V Ivanov (India) A Ponnappa	21	0
(India) H Malik (India) T Dahiya	4	0^{r}
(India) P S Chouhan (India) S Sharma	11	10
3	(Russia) E Dremin (Russia) E Dimova	21	21

Second Round
Q2	(India) G Rao (India) S Kalyani	21	21
PFQ	(India) G Malhan (India) M Singh	6	8
(Russia) V Ivanov (India) A Ponnappa	18	18
3	(Russia) E Dremin (Russia) E Dimova	21	21

Quarterfinals
Q2	(India) G Rao (India) S Kalyani	6	9
3	(Russia) E Dremin (Russia) E Dimova	21	21

==== Section 4 ====
First Round
(India) S Shukla (India) S Ghorpade	21	21
(Malaysia) L Abdul Khalid (Malaysia) Soong FC	14	14
(India) V Sharma (India) J Nashier	6	8
7	(Malaysia) Tan AQ (Malaysia) Lee MY	21	21
PFQ	(India) Ri Sahdev (India) Ra Sahdev	16	11
(India) M Attri (India) M Kukkapalli	21	21
(India) G Venkat (India) J Dewangan	9	13
2	(Singapore) D Chrisnanta (Singapore) V Neo	21	21

Second Round
(India) S Shukla (India) S Ghorpade	10	19
7	(Malaysia) Tan AQ (Malaysia) Lee MY	21	21
(India) M Attri (India) M Kukkapalli	23	21
2	(Singapore) D Chrisnanta (Singapore) V Neo	21	19

Quarterfinals
7	(Malaysia) Tan AQ (Malaysia) Lee MY	21	21	10
(India) M Attri (India) M Kukkapalli	23	10	21

Preceded by 2015 Malaysia Masters Grand Prix Gold	BWF Grand Prix Gold and Grand Prix; 2015 BWF Season	Succeeded by 2015 German Open Grand Prix Gold
