= 2013 Thailand Open Grand Prix Gold =

Tournament details
- Dates: June 4, 2013 - June 9, 2013
- Total prize money: US$120,000
- Venue: Nimibutr Stadium
- Location: Bangkok, Thailand

Champions
- Men's singles: (India) Srikanth Kidambi
- Women's singles: (Thailand) Ratchanok Intanon
- Men's doubles: (South Korea) Shin Baek-cheol (South Korea) Yoo Yeon-seong
- Women's doubles: (Indonesia) Nitya Krishinda Maheswari (Indonesia) Greysia Polii
- Mixed doubles: (Indonesia) Markis Kido (Indonesia) Pia Zebadiah Bernadet

The 2013 Thailand Open Grand Prix Gold was the sixth grand prix gold and grand prix tournament of the 2013 BWF Grand Prix Gold and Grand Prix. The tournament was held in Nimibutr Stadium, Bangkok, Thailand June 4 until June 9, 2013 and had a total purse of $120,000.

== Men's singles ==
=== Seeds ===
1. (Thailand) Boonsak Ponsana (final)
2. (Indonesia) Tommy Sugiarto (first round)
3. (Thailand) Tanongsak Saensomboonsuk (first round)
4. (Indonesia) Dionysius Hayom Rumbaka (second round)
5. (India) Ajay Jayaram (second round)
6. (England) Rajiv Ouseph (quarter-final)
7. (Chinese Taipei) Hsu Jen-hao (quarter-final)
8. (India) Sourabh Varma (second round)
9. (Malaysia) Tan Chun Seang (third round)
10. (India) Anand Pawar (third round)
11. (Finland) Ville Lang (first round)
12. (France) Brice Leverdez (first round)
13. (India) Srikanth Kidambi (champion)
14. (Republic of Ireland) Scott Evans (first round)
15. (Thailand) Suppanyu Avihingsanon (first round)
16. (Indonesia) Andre Kurniawan Tedjono (third round)

=== Finals ===
Quarterfinals
1	(Thailand) Boonsak Ponsana	21	21	21
6	(England) Rajiv Ouseph	15	23	12
(Indonesia) Wisnu Yuli Prasetyo	21	21
(India) Prannoy Kumar	12	19
(South Korea) Shon Wan-ho	17	18
13	(India) Srikanth Kidambi	21	21
7	(Chinese Taipei) Hsu Jen-hao	17	12
(Thailand) Thammasin Sitthikom	21	21

Semifinals
1	(Thailand) Boonsak Ponsana	21	21
(Indonesia) Wisnu Yuli Prasetyo	9	9
13	(India) Srikanth Kidambi	21	21
(Thailand) Thammasin Sitthikom	14	18

Final
1	(Thailand) Boonsak Ponsana	16	12
13	(India) Srikanth Kidambi	21	21

=== Top half ===
==== Section 1 ====
First Round
1	(Thailand) B Ponsana	21	21
PFQ	(Chinese Taipei) Chu H-c	13	13
(Netherlands) E Meijs	18	11
(France) L Corvee	21	21
11	(Finland) V Lang	21	10	22
(Malaysia) Soong JV	19	21	24
(Malaysia) Soo TZ	21	15	21
(Singapore) R Gonansa	13	21	18

Second Round
1	(Thailand) B Ponsana	21	21
(France) L Corvee	8	10
(Malaysia) Soong JV	19	16
(Malaysia) Soo TZ	21	21

Third Round
1	(Thailand) B Ponsana	21	21
(Malaysia) Soo TZ	10	7

==== Section 2 ====
First Round
6	(England) R Ouseph	21	21
(Indonesia) A Dharma	7	9
(South Korea) Lee D-k	21	21
Q7	(Chinese Taipei) Hsu J-t	11	11
14	(Republic of Ireland) S Evans	1^{r}
(Indonesia) Siswanto	3
(Singapore) A Chen	21	21
Q4	(South Korea) Heo K-h	9	9

Second Round
6	(England) R Ouseph	21	17	21
(South Korea) Lee D-k	19	21	12
(Indonesia) Siswanto	17	9
(Singapore) A Chen	21	21

Third Round
6	(England) R Ouseph	21	17	21
(Singapore) A Chen	15	21	19

==== Section 3 ====
First Round
4	(Indonesia) D Rumbaka	15	21	21
(Malaysia) Goh SH	21	13	16
(Malaysia) H Hashim	12	21	20
(India) S Praneeth	21	9	22
12	(France) B Leverdez	21	16	18
(Chinese Taipei) Wan C-h	17	21	21
(Chinese Taipei) Yang C-h	6	17
(Indonesia) W Prasetyo	21	21

Second Round
4	(Indonesia) D Rumbaka	12	21	18
(India) S Praneeth	21	18	21
(Chinese Taipei) Wan C-h	21	19	19
(Indonesia) W Prasetyo	17	21	21

Third Round
(India) S Praneeth	18	21	19
(Indonesia) W Prasetyo	21	16	21

==== Section 4 ====
First Round
5	(India) A Jayaram	21	19	21
PFQ	(Indonesia) S Rhustavito	11	21	9
(India) P Kumar	21	21
Q1	(Thailand) N Nantatheero	11	19
10	(India) A Pawar	21	9	21
(Indonesia) R Subagja	15	21	14
(Indonesia) A Ramadhan	18	21	19
(Thailand) P Poodchalat	21	18	21

Second Round
5	(India) A Jayaram	21	16	13
(India) P Kumar	14	21	21
10	(India) A Pawar	21	0
(Thailand) P Poodchalat	14	0^{r}

Third Round
(India) P Kumar	19	21	21
10	(India) A Pawar	21	13	15

=== Bottom half ===
==== Section 5 ====
First Round
(Germany) A Trisnanto	13	24	19
(Indonesia) E Sukamta	21	22	21
(Chinese Taipei) Hsueh H-y	21	21
15	(Thailand) S Avihingsanon	12	14
(South Korea) Shon W-h	21	21
(Malaysia) Loh WS	14	14
Q3	(Thailand) K Phetpradab	16	18
8	(India) S Varma	21	21

Second Round
(Indonesia) E Sukamta	16	8
(Chinese Taipei) Hsueh H-y	21	21
(South Korea) Shon W-h	21	21
8	(India) S Varma	12	17

Third Round
(Chinese Taipei) Hsueh H-y	21	20	14
(South Korea) Shon W-h	13	22	21

==== Section 6 ====
First Round
(England) T Penty	21	23
(Thailand) P Thongnuam	19	21
Q6	(South Korea) Jeon H-j	17	12
13	(India) S Kidambi	21	21
(Thailand) M Lo Ying Ping	21	27
(Malaysia) B Wong	17	25
Q5	(South Korea) Hwang J-s	21	21
3	(Thailand) T Saensomboonsuk	17	13

Second Round
(England) T Penty	4	14
13	(India) S Kidambi	21	21
(France) M Lo Ying Ping	11	13
Q5	(South Korea) Hwang J-s	21	21

Third Round
13	(India) S Kidambi	21	21
Q5	(South Korea) Hwang J-s	19	15

==== Section 7 ====
First Round
(Indonesia) A Marteen	23	21	21
Q8	(Thailand) P Thongnuam	25	11	16
Q2	(Thailand) K Athaviroj	16	8
9	(Malaysia) Tan CS	21	21
(Indonesia) A Pratama	17	15
(Malaysia) I Zainuddin	21	21
(Japan) R Takeshita	9	9
7	(Chinese Taipei) Hsu J-h	21	21

Second Round
(Indonesia) A Marteen	18	16
9	(Malaysia) Tan CS	21	21
(Malaysia) I Zainuddin	13	18
7	(Chinese Taipei) Hsu J-h	21	21

Third Round
9	(Malaysia) Tan CS	21	17	11
7	(Chinese Taipei) Hsu J-h	16	21	21

==== Section 8 ====
First Round
(Singapore) D Wong	21	21
(South Korea) Park S-m	12	15
(Malaysia) Kuan BH	17	18
16	(Indonesia) A Tedjono	21	21
(Malaysia) Chiang JS	16	10^{r}
(Russia) V Malkov	21	19
(Thailand) T Sitthikom	16	21	21
2	(Indonesia) T Sugiarto	21	19	17

Second Round
(Singapore) D Wong	27	18	20
16	(Indonesia) A Tedjono	25	21	22
(Russia) V Malkov	8	13
(Thailand) T Sitthikom	21	21

Third Round
16	(Indonesia) A Tedjono	22	10	22
(Thailand) T Sitthikom	20	21	24

== Women's singles ==
=== Seeds ===
1. (India) Saina Nehwal (quarter-final)
2. (Thailand) Ratchanok Inthanon (champion)
3. (Thailand) Porntip Buranaprasertsuk (quarter-final)
4. (Chinese Taipei) Pai Hsiao-ma (semi-final)
5. (Thailand) Sapsiree Taerattanachai (quarter-final)
6. (Thailand) Nichaon Jindapon (quarter-final)
7. (Thailand) Busanan Ongbumrungpan (final)
8. (Singapore) Gu Juan (semi-final)

=== Finals ===
Semifinals
8	(Singapore) Gu Juan	17	19
7	(Thailand) Busanan Ongbumrungpan	21	21
4	(Chinese Taipei) Pai Hsiao-ma	13	17
2	(Thailand) Ratchanok Inthanon	21	21

Final
7	(Thailand) Busanan Ongbumrungpan	22	19	13
2	(Thailand) Ratchanok Inthanon	20	21	21

=== Top half ===
==== Section 1 ====
First Round
1	(India) S Nehwal	21	21
PFQ	(Chinese Taipei) Hung S-h	11	16
(Thailand) S Ponsana	11	22	20
(Indonesia) F Angguni	21	20	22
8	(Singapore) Gu J	14	21	24
(Thailand) P Chochuwong	21	7	22
(Malaysia) Yang LL	12	16
(Singapore) Liang XY	21	21

Second Round
1	(India) S Nehwal	21	21
(Indonesia) F Angguni	12	11
8	(Singapore) Gu J	21	21
(Singapore) Liang XY	13	11

Quarterfinals
1	(India) S Nehwal	21	12	18
8	(Singapore) Gu J	13	21	21

==== Section 2 ====
First Round
3	(Thailand) P Buranaprasertsuk	21	21
(India) P Thulasi	14	17
(Chinese Taipei) Hsu Y-c	21	17	21
(Indonesia) M Nadhir	12	21	10
7	(Thailand) B Ongbumrungpan	21	21
(Indonesia) H Desi	13	15
Q2	(South Korea) Lee J-m	21	17	21
Q3	(Chinese Taipei) Chen H-h	12	21	17

Second Round
3	(Thailand) P Buranaprasertsuk	18	21	21
(Chinese Taipei) Hsu Y-c	21	18	19
7	(Thailand) B Ongbumrungpan	21	21
Q2	(South Korea) Lee J-m	11	12

Quarterfinals
3	(Thailand) P Buranaprasertsuk	14	21	17
7	(Thailand) B Ongbumrungpan	21	17	21

=== Bottom half ===
==== Section 3 ====
First Round
(India) A Pantawane	14	21	21
Q4	(South Korea) Lee M-j	21	9	15
(Indonesia) Y Asmarani	17	13
5	(Thailand) S Taerattanachai	21	21
(Republic of Ireland) C Magee	21	21
(Canada) C Tsai	15	14
PFQ	(Thailand) R Prajongjai	21	17	12
4	(Chinese Taipei) Pai H-m	15	21	21

Second Round
(India) A Pantawane	16	13
5	(Thailand) S Taerattanachai	21	21
(Republic of Ireland) C Magee	15	20
4	(Chinese Taipei) Pai H-m	21	22

Quarterfinals
5	(Thailand) S Taerattanachai	21	5	19
4	(Chinese Taipei) Pai H-m	16	21	21

==== Section 4 ====
First Round
(South Korea) Kim H-m	21	21
(Austria) S Prutsch	13	10
(Russia) N Perminova	18	6
6	(Thailand) N Jindapon	21	21
(Singapore) Xing AY	21	21
Q1	(Chinese Taipei) Tang W-y	4	16
(Indonesia) M Kusumastuti	14	21	14
2	(Thailand) R Inthanon	21	17	21

Second Round
(South Korea) Kim H-m	11	10
6	(Thailand) N Jindapon	21	21
(Singapore) Xing AY	7	21	13
2	(Thailand) R Inthanon	21	13	21

Quarterfinals
6	(Thailand) N Jindapon	19	18
2	(Thailand) R Inthanon	21	21

== Men's doubles ==
=== Seeds ===
1. (Malaysia) Mohd Zakry Abdul Latif / Mohd Fairuzizuan Mohd Tazari (quarter-final)
2. (Russia) Vladimir Ivanov / Ivan Sozonov (final)
3. (Indonesia) Markis Kido / Alvent Yulianto (quarter-final)
4. (Malaysia) Gan Teik Chai / Ong Soon Hock (first round)
5. (South Korea) Shin Baek-cheol / Yoo Yeon-seong (champion)
6. (Thailand) Maneepong Jongjit / Nipitphon Puangpuapech (quarter-final)
7. (England) Chris Adcock / Andrew Ellis (semi-final)
8. (England) Chris Langridge / Peter Mills (semi-final)

=== Finals ===
Semifinals
5	(South Korea) Shin Baek-cheol (South Korea) Yoo Yeon-seong	21	21
7	(England) Chris Adcock (England) Andrew Ellis	15	16
8	(England) Chris Langridge (England) Peter Mills	20	12
2	(Russia) Vladimir Ivanov (Russia) Ivan Sozonov	22	21

Final
5	(South Korea) Shin Baek-cheol (South Korea) Yoo Yeon-seong	18	21	21
2	(Russia) Vladimir Ivanov (Russia) Ivan Sozonov	21	15	14

=== Top half ===
==== Section 1 ====
First Round
1	(Malaysia) Z Abdul Latif (Malaysia) F Tazari	22	19	21
(Poland) L Moren (Poland) W Szkudlarczyk	20	21	14
(Indonesia) B Septano (Indonesia) A Wirawan	13	21	16
Q1	(Singapore) D Chrisnanta (Singapore) T Yeo	21	19	21
5	(South Korea) Shin B-c (South Korea) Yoo Y-s	21	17	21
(Thailand) S Prapakamol (Singapore) C Triyachart	11	21	14
(Indonesia) W Nayaka (Indonesia) A Yusuf	20	17
(Malaysia) N Heg (Malaysia) Teo EY	22	21

Second Round
1	(Malaysia) Z Abdul Latif (Malaysia) F Tazari	21	21
Q1	(Singapore) D Chrisnanta (Singapore) T Yeo	17	19
5	(South Korea) Shin B-c (South Korea) Yoo Y-s	21	21
(Malaysia) N Heg (Malaysia) Teo EY	13	17

Quarterfinals
1	(Malaysia) Z Abdul Latif (Malaysia) F Tazari	15	21	17
5	(South Korea) Shin B-c (South Korea) Yoo Y-s	21	15	21

==== Section 2 ====
First Round
3	(Indonesia) M Kido (Indonesia) A Yulianto	21	15	21
(Chinese Taipei) Liang J-w (Chinese Taipei) Liao K-h	14	21	15
(Malaysia) Chooi KM (Malaysia) Ow YH	21	21
(Indonesia) C Rusdianto (Indonesia) T Wardhana	11	17
7	(England) C Adcock (England) A Ellis	21	15	21
(England) M Ellis (Scotland) P Van Rietvelde	16	21	16
(Thailand) B Issara (Thailand) P Vilailak	21	21
Q2	(Chinese Taipei) Lin Y-j (Chinese Taipei) Wang C-h	12	19

Second Round
3	(Indonesia) M Kido (Indonesia) A Yulianto	21	21
(Malaysia) Chooi KM (Malaysia) Ow YH	15	16
7	(England) C Adcock (England) A Ellis	21	21
(Thailand) B Issara (Thailand) P Vilailak	17	9

Quarterfinals
3	(Indonesia) M Kido (Indonesia) A Yulianto	15	21	19
7	(England) C Adcock (England) A Ellis	21	13	21

=== Bottom half ===
==== Section 3 ====
First Round
Q3	(Thailand) D Puavaranukroh (Thailand) K Kittinupong	21	25	21
Q4	(Chinese Taipei) Liao M-c (Chinese Taipei) Yang P-h	14	27	18
(Indonesia) R Alexander (Indonesia) S Geh	19	17
8	(England) C Langridge (England) P Mills	21	21
(South Korea) Kang J-w (South Korea) Lee S-j	21	21
(Scotland) R Blair (Malaysia) Tan BS	17	15
(Indonesia) B Angriawan (Indonesia) Y Sugiarto	21	20	21
4	(Malaysia) Gan TC (Malaysia) Ong SH	19	22	19

Second Round
Q3	(Thailand) D Puavaranukroh (Thailand) K Kittinupong	21	12	19
8	(England) C Langridge (England) P Mills	11	21	21
(South Korea) Kang J-w (South Korea) Lee S-j	21	21
(Indonesia) B Angriawan (Indonesia) Y Sugiarto	14	17

Quarterfinals
8	(England) C Langridge (England) P Mills	21	14	29
(South Korea) Kang J-w (South Korea) Lee S-j	15	21	27

==== Section 4 ====
First Round
(Chinese Taipei) Chen H-l (Chinese Taipei) Lu C-b	21	18
(Japan) T Kamura (Japan) K Sonoda	23	21
(Poland) A Cwalina (Poland) P Wacha	18	16
6	(Thailand) M Jongjit (Thailand) N Puangpuapech	21	21
(Singapore) A Chen (Singapore) D Wong	9	19
(South Korea) Bae K-y (South Korea) Kim D-e	21	21
(Malaysia) Low JS (Malaysia) Tan YJ	14	17
2	(Russia) V Ivanov (Russia) I Sozonov	21	21

Second Round
(Japan) T Kamura (Japan) K Sonoda	16	21
6	(Thailand) M Jongjit (Thailand) N Puangpuapech	21	23
(South Korea) Bae K-y (South Korea) Kim D-e	11	11
2	(Russia) V Ivanov (Russia) I Sozonov	21	21

Quarterfinals
6	(Thailand) M Jongjit (Thailand) N Puangpuapech	11	21	18
2	(Russia) V Ivanov (Russia) I Sozonov	21	15	21

== Women's doubles ==
=== Seeds ===
1. (Thailand) Duanganong Aroonkesorn / Kunchala Voravichitchaikul (quarter-final)
2. (Indonesia) Pia Zebadiah / Rizki Amelia Pradipta (first round)
3. (South Korea) Lee So-hee / Shin Seung-chan (first round)
4. (Thailand) Lam Narissapat / Saralee Thoungthongkam (second round)
5. (South Korea) Choi Hye-in / Eom Hye-won (second round)
6. (Macau) Wang Rong / Zhang Zhibo (withdrew)
7. (South Korea) Ko A-ra / Yoo Hae-won (semi-final)
8. (Indonesia) Greysia Polii / Nitya Krishinda Maheswari (champion)

=== Finals ===
Semifinals
8	(Indonesia) Greysia Polii (Indonesia) Nitya Krishinda Maheswari	21	15	21
7	(South Korea) Ko A-ra (South Korea) Yoo Hae-won	10	21	9
Q4	(Thailand) Porntip Buranaprasertsuk (Thailand) Busanan Ongbumrungpan	21	14	20
(Japan) Yuriko Miki (Japan) Koharu Yonemoto	16	21	22

Final
8	(Indonesia) Greysia Polii (Indonesia) Nitya Krishinda Maheswari	21	21
(Japan) Yuriko Miki (Japan) Koharu Yonemoto	7	13

=== Top half ===
==== Section 1 ====
First Round
1	(Thailand) D Aroonkesorn (Thailand) K Voravichitchaikul	21	21
(Chinese Taipei) Chen H-h (Chinese Taipei) Lai C-w	9	9
(Thailand) P Chochuwong (Thailand) C Teachavorasinskun	13	21	21
Q2	(Thailand) P Krajangjit (Thailand) K Ostermeyer	21	18	19
8	(Indonesia) G Polii (Indonesia) N Maheswari	21	21
(Japan) N Fukuman (Japan) K Yonao	12	18
(Australia) J Guan (Australia) G Somerville	9	8
(Thailand) A Serithammarak (Thailand) P Munkitamorn	21	21

Second Round
1	(Thailand) D Aroonkesorn (Thailand) K Voravichitchaikul	21	21
(Thailand) P Chochuwong (Thailand) C Teachavorasinskun	17	17
8	(Indonesia) G Polii (Indonesia) N Maheswari	21	21
(Thailand) A Serithammarak (Thailand) P Munkitamorn	11	17

Quarterfinals
1	(Thailand) D Aroonkesorn (Thailand) K Voravichitchaikul	17	13
8	(Indonesia) G Polii (Indonesia) N Maheswari	21	21

==== Section 2 ====
First Round
3	(South Korea) Lee S-h (South Korea) Shin S-c	14	23	16
PFQ	(South Korea) Chae Y-j (South Korea) Kim J-w	21	21	21
(Indonesia) K Dewi (Indonesia) M Jauhari	22	21
(England) H Olver (England) K Robertshaw	20	16
7	(South Korea) Ko A-r (South Korea) Yoo H-w	21	22
(Singapore) V Neo (Singapore) S Sari	12	20
PFQ	(England) A Langley (England) A Lim	wo
(South Korea) Jang Y-n (South Korea) Kim S-y

Second Round
PFQ	(South Korea) Chae Y-j (South Korea) Kim J-w	21	21
(Indonesia) K Dewi (Indonesia) M Jauhari	10	18
7	(South Korea) Ko A-r (South Korea) Yoo H-w	21	14	21
(South Korea) Jang Y-n (South Korea) Kim S-y	17	21	16

Quarterfinals
PFQ	(South Korea) Chae Y-j (South Korea) Kim J-w	14	12
7	(South Korea) Ko A-r (South Korea) Yoo H-w	21	21

=== Bottom half ===
==== Section 3 ====
First Round
(Malaysia) Chow MK (Malaysia) Lai SJ	17	13
Q4	(Thailand) P Buranaprasertsuk (Thailand) B Ongbumrungpan	21	21
(England) L Smith (England) G White	18	22	10
5	(South Korea) Choi H-i (South Korea) Eom H-w	21	20	21
(Thailand) P Supajirakul (Thailand) S Taerattanachai	11	21	21
Q1	(Thailand) C Chaladchalam (Thailand) P Muenwong	21	19	16
(Russia) T Bibik (Russia) A Chervaykova	4	18
4	(Thailand) L Narissapat (Thailand) S Thoungthongkam	21	21

Second Round
Q4	(Thailand) P Buranaprasertsuk (Thailand) B Ongbumrungpan	11	21	21
5	(South Korea) Choi H-i (South Korea) Eom H-w	21	18	18
(Thailand) P Supajirakul (Thailand) S Taerattanachai	14	21	21
4	(Thailand) L Narissapat (Thailand) S Thoungthongkam	21	14	17

Quarterfinals
Q4	(Thailand) P Buranaprasertsuk (Thailand) B Ongbumrungpan	21	20	22
(Thailand) P Supajirakul (Thailand) S Taerattanachai	18	22	20

==== Section 4 ====
First Round
(Indonesia) K Hanadia (Indonesia) D Permatasari	21	13	21
Q3	(Thailand) R Chuthabunditkul (Thailand) J Kittiharakul	19	21	16
(Indonesia) S Andini (Indonesia) J Gozali	21	21
PFQ	(Thailand) N Saengchote (Thailand) S Suwannakitborihan	11	17
(Chinese Taipei) Wang P-r (Chinese Taipei) Kuo Y-w	19	20
(Singapore) Fu MT (Singapore) Yao L	21	22
(Japan) Y Miki (Japan) K Yonemoto	17	21	21
2	(Indonesia) P Zebadiah (Indonesia) R Pradipta	21	16	17

Second Round
(Indonesia) K Hanadia (Indonesia) D Permatasari	18	18
(Indonesia) S Andini (Indonesia) J Gozali	21	21
(Singapore) Fu MT (Singapore) Yao L	13	20
(Japan) Y Miki (Japan) K Yonemoto	21	22

Quarterfinals
(Indonesia) S Andini (Indonesia) J Gozali	21	15	14
(Japan) Y Miki (Japan) K Yonemoto	18	21	21

== Mixed doubles ==
=== Seeds ===
1. (Thailand) Sudket Prapakamol / Saralee Thoungthongkam (first round)
2. (Indonesia) Markis Kido / Pia Zebadiah (champion)
3. (Denmark) Anders Kristiansen / Julie Houmann (second round)
4. (Indonesia) Riky Widianto / Richi Puspita Dili (final)
5. (South Korea) Shin Baek-cheol / Jang Ye-na (first round)
6. (England) Chris Adcock / Gabrielle White (first round)
7. (Singapore) Danny Bawa Chrisnanta / Vanessa Neo Yu Yan (quarter-final)
8. (Malaysia) Tan Aik Quan / Lai Pei Jing (quarter-final)

=== Finals ===
Semifinals
(Japan) Takeshi Kamura (Japan) Koharu Yonemoto	8	16
4	(Indonesia) Riky Widianto (Indonesia) Richi Puspita Dili	21	21
(Chinese Taipei) Tseng Min-hao (Chinese Taipei) Cheng Wen-hsing	18	8
2	(Indonesia) Markis Kido (Indonesia) Pia Zebadiah	21	21

Final
4	(Indonesia) Riky Widianto (Indonesia) Richi Puspita Dili	21	15	15
2	(Indonesia) Markis Kido (Indonesia) Pia Zebadiah	18	21	21

=== Top half ===
==== Section 1 ====
First Round
1	(Thailand) S Prapakamol (Thailand) S Thoungthongkam	21	14	14
(Indonesia) I Fadhilah (Indonesia) W Anggraini	18	21	21
(Japan) T Kamura (Japan) K Yonemoto	21	21
(Singapore) T Yeo (Singapore) Yao L	11	19
8	(Malaysia) Tan AQ (Malaysia) Lai PJ	21	21
(Republic of Ireland) S Magee (Republic of Ireland) C Magee	13	18
(England) M Ellis (England) A Lim	21	22	21
(France) L Constantin (France) L Choinet	14	24	14

Second Round
(Indonesia) I Fadhilah (Indonesia) W Anggraini	18	21	19
(Japan) T Kamura (Japan) K Yonemoto	21	16	21
8	(Malaysia) Tan AQ (Malaysia) Lai PJ
(England) M Ellis (England) A Lim	wo

Quarterfinals
(Japan) T Kamura (Japan) K Yonemoto	21	21
8	(Malaysia) Tan AQ (Malaysia) Lai PJ	15	21

==== Section 2 ====
First Round
4	(Indonesia) R Widianto (Indonesia) R Dili	11	21	21
(South Korea) Lee S-j (South Korea) Choi H-i	21	17	17
PFQ	(Malaysia) F Tazari (Indonesia) D Permatasari	21	21
(Chinese Taipei) Lin C-y (Chinese Taipei) Wang P-r	19	9
5	(South Korea) Shin B-c (South Korea) Jang Y-n	21	21	20
(Chinese Taipei) Liao M-c (Chinese Taipei) Chen H-h	23	15	22
(Thailand) W Ampunsuwan (Thailand) R Chuthabunditkul	18	21	21
(England) C Langridge (England) H Olver	21	19	23

Second Round
4	(Indonesia) R Widianto (Indonesia) R Dili	21	19	21
PFQ	(Malaysia) F Tazari (Indonesia) D Permatasari	19	21	14
(Chinese Taipei) Liao M-c (Chinese Taipei) Chen H-h	16	21	19
(England) C Langridge (England) H Olver	21	17	21

Quarterfinals
4	(Indonesia) R Widianto (Indonesia) R Dili	21	21
(England) C Langridge (England) H Olver	12	19

=== Bottom half ===
==== Section 3 ====
First Round
(Thailand) P Chalardchaleam (Thailand) J Kittiharakul	16	13
(South Korea) Kang J-w (South Korea) Shin S-c	21	21
Q4	(Indonesia) E Subaktiar (Indonesia) G Widjaja	21	21
6	(England) C Adcock (England) G White	19	19
(New Zealand) O Leydon-Davis (New Zealand) S Leydon-Davis	16	12
(Chinese Taipei) Tseng M-h (Chinese Taipei) Cheng W-h	21	21
Q2	(Indonesia) A Yulianto (Indonesia) R Pradipta	9	21	17
3	(Denmark) A Kristiansen (Denmark) J Houmann	21	18	21

Second Round
(South Korea) Kang J-w (South Korea) Shin S-c	16	17
Q4	(Indonesia) E Subaktiar (Indonesia) G Widjaja	21	21
(Chinese Taipei) Tseng M-h (Chinese Taipei) Cheng W-h	21	21
3	(Denmark) A Kristiansen (Denmark) J Houmann	18	16

Quarterfinals
Q4	(Indonesia) E Subaktiar (Indonesia) G Widjaja	20	20
(Chinese Taipei) Tseng M-h (Chinese Taipei) Cheng W-h	22	22

==== Section 4 ====
First Round
Q1	(Singapore) T Hee (Singapore) S Sari	21	14	21
(Thailand) S Anugritayawon (Thailand) K Voravichitchaikul	16	21	12
Q3	(Thailand) V Nilyoke (Thailand) A Serithammarak	13	16
7	(Singapore) D Chrisnanta (Singapore) V Neo	21	21
(South Korea) Yoo Y-s (South Korea) Eom H-w	21	21
(Indonesia) L Nugroho (Indonesia) A Saufika	15	19
(Thailand) M Jongjit (Thailand) P Supajirakul	12	19
2	(Indonesia) M Kido (Indonesia) P Zebadiah	21	21

Second Round
Q1	(Singapore) T Hee (Singapore) S Sari	16	13
7	(Singapore) D Chrisnanta (Singapore) V Neo	21	21
(South Korea) Yoo Y-s (South Korea) Eom H-w	15	13
2	(Indonesia) M Kido (Indonesia) P Zebadiah	21	21

Quarterfinals
7	(Singapore) D Chrisnanta (Singapore) V Neo	16	14
2	(Indonesia) M Kido (Indonesia) P Zebadiah	21	21

Preceded by 2013 Malaysia Grand Prix Gold	BWF Grand Prix Gold and Grand Prix; 2013 season	Succeeded by 2013 U.S. Open Grand Prix Gold
