= Badminton at the 2015 SEA Games – Mixed doubles =

Mixed doubles at the 2015 SEA Games
- Venue: Singapore Indoor Stadium
- Dates: 13–16 June 2015
- Competitors: 24 from 6 nations

Medalists
gold medal	Praveen Jordan; Debby Susanto	Indonesia
silver medal	Chan Peng Soon; Goh Liu Ying	Malaysia
bronze medal	Riky Widianto; Richi Puspita Dili	Indonesia
bronze medal	Sudket Prapakamol; Sapsiree Taerattanachai	Thailand

The mixed doubles competition in badminton at the 2015 SEA Games is being held from 13 to 16 June 2015 at the Singapore Indoor Stadium in Kallang, Singapore.

== Schedule ==
All times are Singapore Standard Time (UTC+08:00)

Date	Time	Event
Saturday, 13 June 2015	14:00	Round of 16
Sunday, 14 June 2015	14:00	Quarter-final
Monday, 15 June 2015	14:10	Semi-final
Tuesday, 16 June 2015	12:20	Gold medal match

== Results ==
Source: Results Summary

Round of 16; 13 June 14:00
Tan Aik Quan (MAS); Lai Pei Jing (MAS)	21	21
Đào Mạnh Thắng (VIE); Phạm Như Thảo (VIE)	13	12
Sudket Prapakamol (THA); Sapsiree Taerattanachai (THA)	21	21
Oo Chan Win (MYA); Yee Le Le (MYA)	8	6
Chan Peng Soon (MAS); Goh Liu Ying (MAS)	21	21
Danny Bawa Chrisnanta (SIN); Vanessa Neo (SIN)	18	16
Nipitphon Phuangphuapet (THA); Puttita Supajirakul (THA)	17	21	22
Dương Bảo Đức (VIE); Thái Thị Hồng Gấm (VIE)	21	13	20

Quarterfinal; 14 June 14:00
Praveen Jordan (INA); Debby Susanto (INA)	21	21	21
Tan Aik Quan (MAS); Lai Pei Jing (MAS)	17	23	17
Terry Hee (SIN); Tan Wei Han (SIN)	12	22	17
Prapakamol (THA); Taerattanachai (THA)	21	20	21
Chan (MAS); Goh (MAS)	21	21
Htoo Aung Myo (MYA); Lin Khaing Zar (MYA)	9	16
Phuangphuapet (THA); Supajirakul (THA)	20	21	15
Riky Widianto (INA); Richi Puspita Dili (INA)	22	19	21

Semifinal; 15 June 14:10
Jordan (INA); Susanto (INA)	21	8	21
Prapakamol (THA); Taerattanachai (THA)	13	21	14
Chan (MAS); Goh (MAS)	21	18	22
Widianto (INA); Dili (INA)	18	21	20

Gold medal match 16 June 12:20
Jordan (INA); Susanto (INA)	18	21	25
Chan (MAS); Goh (MAS)	21	13	23
