= Pia Zebadiah Bernadet =

Indonesian badminton player (born 1989)

Pia Zebadiah
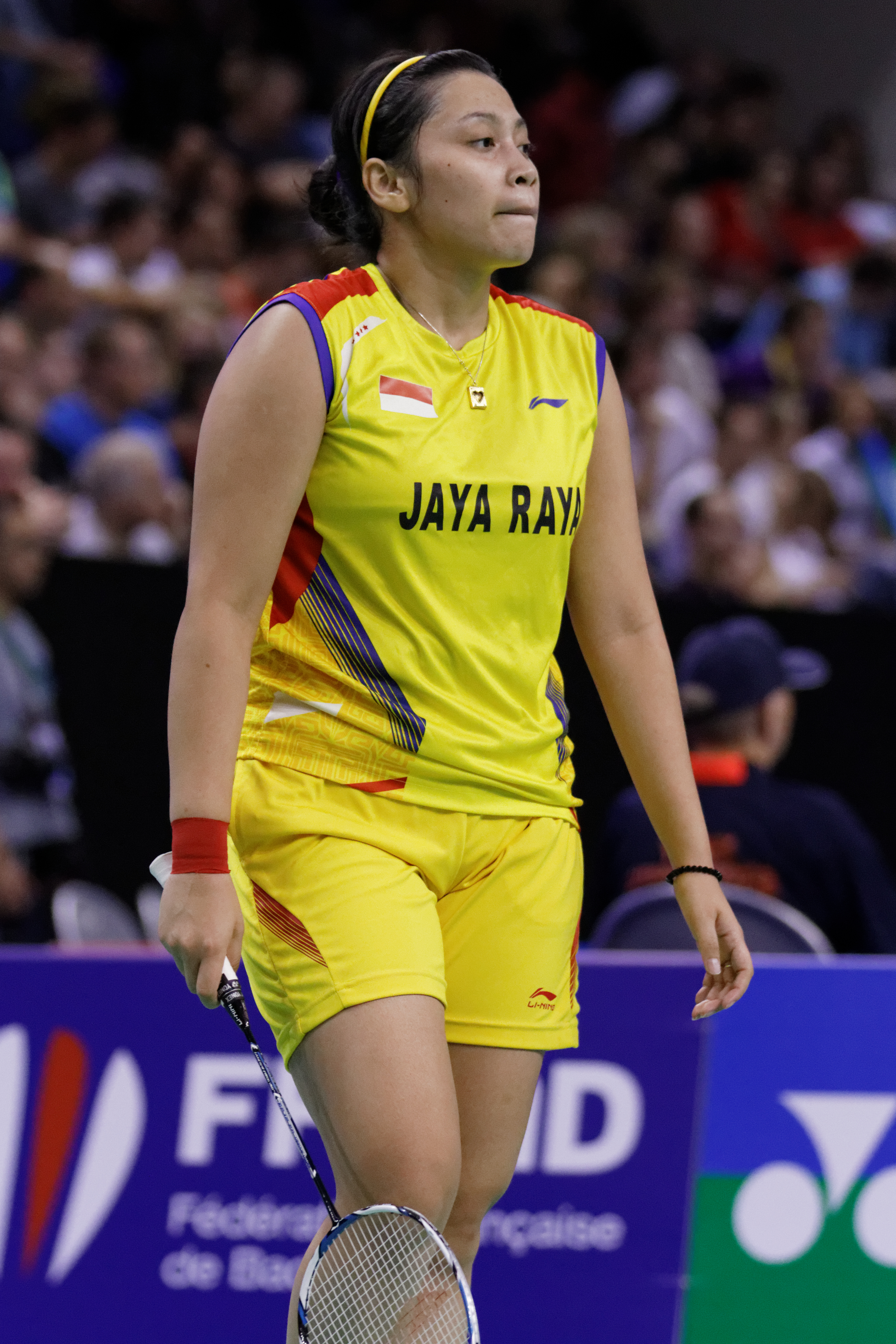
- Pia Zebadiah Bernadet at the 2013 French Super Series.

Personal information
- Born: Pia Zebadiah Bernadet; January 22, 1989 (age 37) Medan, North Sumatra, Indonesia
- Height: 1.63 m (5 ft 4 in)
- Weight: 60 kg (132 lb)

Sport
- Country: Indonesia
- Sport: Badminton
- Handedness: Right

Women's & mixed doubles
- Highest ranking: 6 (WD with Rizki Amelia Pradipta 27 June 2013); 8 (XD with Markis Kido 25 April 2013)
- Current ranking: 67 WD with Anggia Shitta Awanda; 61 XD with Ricky Karanda Suwardi; 177 XD with Amri Syahnawi (21 September 2021)
- BWF profile
Medal record
Women's badminton
Representing Indonesia
Sudirman Cup
Silver medal – second place	2007 Glasgow	Mixed team
Bronze medal – third place	2011 Qingdao	Mixed team
Uber Cup
Silver medal – second place	2008 Jakarta	Women's team
Asian Games
Bronze medal – third place	2010 Guangzhou	Women's team
Southeast Asian Games
Gold medal – first place	2007 Nakhon Ratchasima	Women's team
Summer Universiade
Bronze medal – third place	2007 Bangkok	Mixed team
World Junior Championships
Bronze medal – third place	2006 Incheon	Girls' doubles
Asia Junior Championships
Bronze medal – third place	2004 Hwacheon	Girls' team
Bronze medal – third place	2005 Jakarta	Girls' team
Bronze medal – third place	2006 Kuala Lumpur	Mixed doubles
Bronze medal – third place	2006 Kuala Lumpur	Mixed team

Pia Zebadiah Bernadet (born 22 January 1989) is an Indonesian badminton player. She is the sister of men's doubles world and Olympic champion Markis Kido.

== Career ==
=== Women's singles ===
In 2007, Zebadiah contributed to the Indonesian women's team's capture of the gold medal at the Southeast Asian Games by beating Singapore's Gu Juan 21–15, 17–21, 21–12 in the decisive match.

Perhaps her best performance came in the 2008 Uber Cup. She helped Indonesia to defeat Germany in the semifinals by dominating Karin Schnaase 21–7, 21–15.

She played in the 2008 Indonesia, Japan, and Denmark Superseries, advancing farthest in Denmark where she reached the quarterfinals.

Another good performance came at the Chinese Taipei Open, where she defeated her compatriot Maria Kristin Yulianti, who won the bronze medal at the 2008 Olympic Games, in the quarter-final. However, she lost to the young star from India, Saina Nehwal, in the semifinals.

=== Women's doubles ===
Pia Zebadiah plays in the women's doubles with Rizki Amelia Pradipta. Previously, she played with Debby Susanto, but they were often defeated in the earlier rounds of a tournament. Because she couldn't play well in several tournaments in the women's doubles discipline, she broke her partnership with Susanto. In 2011, Zebadiah decided to be a professional player along with her brother Kido, rather than be in the national training center. After becoming a professional player, she became partners with Pradipta. Together they achieved better results in women's doubles. In 2012, she with Pradipta won Chinese Taipei Open, and in 2013, they won the Malaysia Grand Prix Gold.

=== Mixed doubles ===
Pia Zebadiah played in the mixed doubles with Fran Kurniawan. She always appeared confident, and very lissom. In 2009, Zebadiah took the first title from New Zealand Open and defeated World number 10 Yohan Hadikusumo Wiratama and Chau Hoi Wah from Hong Kong. In 2010, they reached the semi-finals in the Indonesia Grand Prix Gold, but were defeated by Tontowi Ahmad and Liliyana Natsir. In 2011, they could reach their first final in the Superseries event at the India Open, but they were once again defeated by Ahmad and Natsir with just straight sets of 18–21 and 21–23. They became the main pair of mixed doubles in the Sudirman Cup due to Natsir injury.

== Personal life ==
Zebadiah's brothers, Bona Septano, and Markis Kido, are also Indonesian national badminton players.

== Achievements ==
=== BWF World Junior Championships ===
Girls' doubles
Year	Venue	Partner	Opponent	Score	Result
2006	Samsan World Gymnasium; Incheon, South Korea	(Indonesia) Nitya Krishinda Maheswari	(China) Ma Jin (China) Wang Xiaoli	14–21, 17–21	Bronze

=== Asian Junior Championships ===
Mixed doubles
Year	Venue	Partner	Opponent	Score	Result
2006	Kuala Lumpur Badminton Stadium; Kuala Lumpur, Malaysia	(Indonesia) Subakti	(Malaysia) Tan Wee Kiong (Malaysia) Woon Khe Wei	14–21, 21–16, 14–21	Bronze

=== BWF Superseries (1 runner-up) ===
The BWF Superseries, which was launched on 14 December 2006 and implemented in 2007, was a series of elite badminton tournaments, sanctioned by the Badminton World Federation (BWF). BWF Superseries levels were Superseries and Superseries Premier. A season of Superseries consisted of twelve tournaments around the world that had been introduced since 2011. Successful players were invited to the Superseries Finals, which were held at the end of each year.

Mixed doubles
Year	Tournament	Partner	Opponent	Score	Result
2011	India Open	(Indonesia) Fran Kurniawan	(Indonesia) Tontowi Ahmad (Indonesia) Liliyana Natsir	18–21, 21–23	(silver) Runner-up

BWF Super Series Finals tournament
BWF Super Series Premier tournament
BWF Super Series tournament

=== BWF Grand Prix (6 titles) ===
The BWF Grand Prix had two levels, the Grand Prix and Grand Prix Gold. It was a series of badminton tournaments sanctioned by the Badminton World Federation (BWF) and played between 2007 and 2017.

Women's doubles
Year	Tournament	Partner	Opponent	Score	Result
2012	Vietnam Open	(Indonesia) Rizki Amelia Pradipta	(Malaysia) Ng Hui Ern (Malaysia) Ng Hui Lin	21–17, 21–19	(gold) Winner
2012	Chinese Taipei Open	(Indonesia) Rizki Amelia Pradipta	(Indonesia) Suci Rizki Andini (Indonesia) Della Destiara Haris	21–15, 21–12	(gold) Winner
2013	Malaysia Grand Prix Gold	(Indonesia) Rizki Amelia Pradipta	(Indonesia) Aprilsasi Putri Lejarsar Variella (Indonesia) Vita Marissa	21–17, 16–21, 21–17	(gold) Winner

Mixed doubles
Year	Tournament	Partner	Opponent	Score	Result
2009	New Zealand Open	(Indonesia) Fran Kurniawan	(Hong Kong) Yohan Hadikusumo Wiratama (Hong Kong) Chau Hoi Wah	21–13, 21–19	(gold) Winner
2012	Vietnam Open	(Indonesia) Markis Kido	(Malaysia) Tan Aik Quan (Malaysia) Lai Pei Jing	23–21, 21–8	(gold) Winner
2013	Thailand Open	(Indonesia) Markis Kido	(Indonesia) Riky Widianto (Indonesia) Richi Puspita Dili	18–21, 21–15, 21–15	(gold) Winner

BWF Grand Prix Gold tournament
BWF Grand Prix tournament

=== International Challenge/Series/Satellite (9 titles, 4 runners-up) ===
Women's singles
Year	Tournament	Opponent	Score	Result
2006	Jakarta Satellite	(Japan) Sachiyo Imai	21–12, 21–18	(gold) Winner

Women's doubles
Year	Tournament	Partner	Opponent	Score	Result
2009	Vietnam International	(Indonesia) Debby Susanto	(Japan) Yuki Itagaki (Japan) Yui Miyauchi	21–17, 17–21, 21–15	(gold) Winner
2012	Vietnam International	(Indonesia) Rizki Amelia Pradipta	(Malaysia) Amelia Alicia Anscelly (Malaysia) Soong Fie Cho	21–10, 21–15	(gold) Winner
2012	Indonesia International	(Indonesia) Rizki Amelia Pradipta	(South Korea) Lee Se-rang (South Korea) Yoo Hyun-young	21–17, 19–21, 21–13	(gold) Winner
2015	Swiss International	(Indonesia) Aprilsasi Putri Lejarsar Variella	(Netherlands) Samantha Barning (Netherlands) Iris Tabeling	11–21, 10–21	(silver) Runner-up
2018	Indonesia International	(Indonesia) Shella Devi Aulia	(Malaysia) Lim Chiew Sien (Malaysia) Tan Sueh Jeou	21–17, 21–12	(gold) Winner
2019	Indonesia International	(Indonesia) Anggia Shitta Awanda	(Japan) Natsu Saito (Japan) Naru Shinoya	21–19, 21–18	(gold) Winner

Mixed doubles
Year	Tournament	Partner	Opponent	Score	Result
2009	Vietnam International	(Indonesia) Fran Kurniawan	(Indonesia) Tontowi Ahmad (Indonesia) Richi Puspita Dili	14–21, 8–21	(silver) Runner-up
2012	Vietnam International	(Indonesia) Hafiz Faizal	(Singapore) Danny Bawa Chrisnanta (Singapore) Vanessa Neo	11–21, 21–17, 21–17	(gold) Winner
2015	Swiss International	(Scotland) Robert Blair	(Thailand) Bodin Isara (Thailand) Savitree Amitrapai	18–21, 25–23, 21–18	(gold) Winner
2017	Indonesia International	(Indonesia) Irfan Fadhilah	(Indonesia) Rehan Naufal Kusharjanto (Indonesia) Siti Fadia Silva Ramadhanti	9–21, 18–21	(silver) Runner-up
2018	Indonesia International	(Indonesia) Irfan Fadhilah	(Indonesia) Amri Syahnawi (Indonesia) Shella Devi Aulia	17–21, 16–21	(silver) Runner-up
2019	Malaysia International	(Indonesia) Amri Syahnawi	(Indonesia) Andika Ramadiansyah (Indonesia) Bunga Fitriani Romadhini	21–15, 21–17	(gold) Winner

BWF International Challenge tournament
BWF International Series tournament

== Performance timeline ==
=== National team ===
- Junior level

Team event	2004	2005	2006
Asian Junior Championships	Bronze	Bronze	Bronze

- Senior level

Team events	2006	2007	2008	2009	2010	2011
Universiade	—N/a	Bronze	—N/a			A
Southeast Asian Games	—N/a	Gold	—N/a	A	—N/a	A
Asian Games	R	—N/a			Bronze	—N/a
Uber Cup	A	—N/a	Silver	—N/a	A	—N/a
Sudirman Cup	—N/a	Silver	—N/a	A	—N/a	Bronze

=== Individual competitions ===
- Junior level

Events	2006
Asian Junior Championships	Bronze (XD)
World Junior Championships	Bronze (GD)

- Senior level

Events	2006	2007	2008	2009	2010	2011	2012	2013	2014	2015
Asian Championships								w/d (WD); R2 (XD)		
'Asian Games	R16 (WD)	—N/a			R16 (XD)	—N/a			A	—N/a
World Championships			—N/a		R2 (XD)	R2 (XD)	—N/a	QF (WD)	R3 (WD); R2 (XD)	R2 (WD)

Tournament	BWF World Tour			Best
Tournament	2018	2019	2020	Best
Malaysia Masters	A		R2 (XD)	W (2013)
Indonesia Masters	A		Q1 (WD)]] R1 (XD)	SF (2010, 2012)
India Open	A	R1 (WD); R2 (XD)	—N/a	F (2011)
Malaysia Open	A	R1 (WD); R2 (XD)	—N/a	QF (2014)
Singapore Open	A	R1 (WD); QF (XD)	—N/a	SF (2013)
Indonesia Open	R1 (WD)	A	—N/a	QF (2010, 2011, 2012, 2013)
Thailand Open	R1 (XD)	A		W (2013)
Chinese Taipei Open	A	R1 (WD); R2 (XD)	—N/a	W (2012)
Vietnam Open	A	SF (WD); QF <(XD)	—N/a	W (2012 (WD, XD))
Indonesia Masters Super 100	R1 (WD); QF (XD)	R2 (WD); QF (XD)	—N/a	QF (2018, 2019)
Year-end ranking	250 (WD); 49 (XD)	68 (WD); 72 (XD)	61 (WD); 54 (XD)	6 (WD); 6 (XD)
Tournament	2018	2019	2020	Best

Tournament	BWF Superseries											Best
Tournament	2007	2008	2009	2010	2011	2012	2013	2014	2015	2016	2017	Best
All England Open	A	R1 (WS)	R1 (WS)	R1 (XD)	R1 (XD)	A	QF (WD); SF (XD)	QF (WD); R2 (XD)	R1 (WD); R1 (XD)	A		SF (2013)
Swiss Open	A		R1 (WS)	A	GPG							QF (2013, 2014)
India Open	—N/a	GPG			F (XD)	A		R1 (WD); R2 (XD)	A			F (2011)
Malaysia Open	A	R1 (WS)	R2 (WS)	A	R2 (XD)	A	R2 (WD); R1 (XD)	QF (WD); QF (XD)	R2 (WD); R2 (XD)	R1 (XD)	A	QF (2014)
Singapore Open	Q3	R2 (WS)	A	R1 (XD)	R2 (XD)	R2 (WD); R1 (XD)	SF (WD); R1 (XD)	R1 (WD); R1 (XD)	QF (WD); R2 (XD)	R1 (WD); R1 (XD)	A	SF (2013)
Australian Open	IS		GP		GPG			R2 (WD); SF (XD)	R1 (WD); R1 (XD)	A		SF (2014)
Indonesia Open	R2 (WS)	R1 (WS)	R1 (WD); R2 (XD)	QF (XD)	QF (XD)	R2 (WD); QF (XD)	QF (WD); R2 (XD)	R1 (WD); R1 (XD)	R1 (WD); R1 (XD)	R1 (XD)	A	QF (2010, 2011, 2012, 2013)
China Masters	A			R2 (XD)	A		QF (WD); SF (XD)	GPG				SF (2013)
Japan Open	A	R1 (WS)	A	QF (XD)	R1 (XD)	A	SF (WD); QF (XD)	A	R1 (XD)	A		SF (2013)
Korea Open	A		R2 (WS)	A	R2 (XD)	A	R1 (WD); QF (XD)	A				QF (2013)
Denmark Open	A	R1 (WS)	R1 (XD)	A	R1 (XD)	R1 (WD); QF (XD)	R2 (WD); R2 (XD)	R2 (WD); R1 (XD)	A			QF (2012)
French Open	A	R1 (WS)	R2 (XD)	A	R1 (XD)	QF (WD); R1 (XD)	R2 (WD); R2 (XD)	R1 (WD); QF (XD)	A			QF (2012, 2014)
China Open	A		R1 (XD)	A			R2 (WD); R2 (XD)	A	R1 (XD)	A		R2 (2013)
Hong Kong Open	A	R2 (WS)	QF (XD)	QF (XD)	A	R1 (WD); R2 (XD)	R2 (WD); QF (XD)	R2 (WD); R1 (XD)	A			QF (2009, 2010, 2013)
BWF Super Series Finals	—N/a	DNQ					RR (WD); RR (xd)	DNQ				RR (2013)
Year-end ranking			105 (WS); 61 (WD); 19 (XD)	127 (WD); 14 (XD)	13 (XD)	15 (WD); 19 (XD)	6 (WD); 9 (XD)	14 (WD); 17 (XD)	38 (WD); 37 (XD)	296 (WD); 112 (XD)	691 (WD); 292 (XD)	
Tournament	2007	2008	2009	2010	2011	2012	2013	2014	2015	2016	2017	Best

Tournament	BWF Grand Prix and Grand Prix Gold											Best
Tournament	2007	2008	2009	2010	2011	2012	2013	2014	2015	2016	2017	Best
Malaysia Masters	—N/a		w/d	A	SF <(XD)	R2 (WD)	W (WD); R2 (XD)	A	SF (WD); R1 (XD)	w/d	A	W (2013)
Philippines Open	R1 (WS)	—N/a	QF (WD); R2 (XD)	—N/a								QF (2009)
Syed Modi International	—N/a		A				—N/a	QF (WD)	A			QF (2014)
Thailand Masters	—N/a									R2 (WD); R2 (XD)	A	R2 (2016)
Swiss Open	SS				R1 (WD); R1 (XD)	A	QF (WD); QF (XD)	QF (WD); QF (XD)	R1 (WD); R1 (XD)	A		QF (2013, 2014)
Australian Open	A						R1 (WD); QF (XD)	SS				QF (2013)
New Zealand Open	IS	QF (WD); W (XD)	A	—N/a	A	—N/a	A		QF (WD); SF (XD)	A		W (2009)
Chinese Taipei Open	A	SF (WS)	R1 (WD); R2 (XD)	QF (WD); SF (XD)	SF (XD)	W (WD); R2 (XD)	A	SF (XD)	QF (WD); R2 (XD)	A		W (2012)
Vietnam Open	A					W (WD); W (XD)	A		R1 (WD); QF (XD)			W (2012 (WD, XD))
Thailand Open	A			—N/a	A	R1 (WD); R1 (XD)	R1 (WD); W (XD)	—N/a	R1 (WD); R2 (XD)	A		W (2013)
Dutch Open	R1 (WS)	A				QF (WD); SF (XD)	A		SF (WD); QF (XD)	A		SF (2012, 2015)
Bitburger Open	A								R1 (WD)	A		R1 (2015)
Macau Open	R1 (WS)	A	R1 (XD)	R2 (WD); SF (XD)	A	SF (WD); R1 (XD)	A		R1 (XD)	A		SF (2010, 2012)
Indonesian Masters	—N/a			SF (XD)	R2 (XD)	SF (WD); SF (XD)	R1 (WD); R2 (XD)	A	QF (WD); R2 (XD)	A	—N/a	SF (2010, 2012)
