= World University Badminton Championships =

Badminton competition

- Sport: Badminton
- Founded: 1990

The World University Badminton Championships is a competition sponsored by the International University Sports Federation (FISU), which was first held in 1990 in Nicosia, Cyprus.

== Competitions ==
Edition	Year	Country	City	No. of Countries	Players		Total
Edition	Year	Country	City	No. of Countries	Male	Female	Total
1	1990	Cyprus	Nicosia	16	38	36	74
2	1992	Sweden	Karlstad	23	44	38	82
3	1994	Czech Republic	Prague	21	38	30	68
4	1996	France	Strasbourg	29	59	41	100
5	1998	Turkey	Istanbul	22	46	39	85
6	2000	Bulgaria	Sofia	14	32	31	63
7	2002	Poland	Kraków	21	52	40	92
8	2004	Thailand	Bangkok	20	72	62	134
9	2006	China	Wuhan	16	57	54	111
10	2007	Thailand	Bangkok	33	80	79	159
11	2008	Portugal	Braga	22	87	75	162
12	2010	Taiwan	Taipei	20	68	63	131
13	2011	China	Shenzhen	19	38	37	75
14	2012	South Korea	Gwangju	18	70	57	127
15	2013	Russia	Kazan				
16	2014	Spain	Córdoba	21	81	80	161
17	2015	South Korea	Gwangju				
18	2016	Russia	Ramenskoye	16	68	64	132
19	2017	Taiwan	Taipei				
20	2018	Malaysia	Kuala Lumpur	16	77	64	141

== Results ==
=== 2002 Kraków ===
Event	Gold	Silver	Bronze
Men's singles	(China) Hu Yun	(Japan) Shinya Ohtsuka	(Poland) Przemysław Wacha
Men's singles	(China) Hu Yun	(Japan) Shinya Ohtsuka	(Chinese Taipei) Chien Yu-hsiu
Women's singles	(China) Hu Ting	(China) Li Shasha	(Chinese Taipei) Chien Yu-chin
Women's singles	(China) Hu Ting	(China) Li Shasha	(United Kingdom) Susan Egelstaff
Women's doubles	(Chinese Taipei) Cheng Wen-hsing (Chinese Taipei) Chien Yu-chin	(China) Zou Shisi (China) Li Shasha	(Thailand) Duanganong Aroonkesorn (Thailand) Kunchala Voravichitchaikul
Women's doubles	(Chinese Taipei) Cheng Wen-hsing (Chinese Taipei) Chien Yu-chin	(China) Zou Shisi (China) Li Shasha	(Japan) Mihoko Matsuo (Japan) Emi Ueda

=== 2004 Bangkok ===
Event	Gold	Silver	Bronze
Men's singles	(Thailand) Boonsak Ponsana	(China) Hu Yun	(South Korea) Jung Hoon-min
Men's singles	(Thailand) Boonsak Ponsana	(China) Hu Yun	(Chinese Taipei) Liao Sheng-shiun
Women's singles	(Chinese Taipei) Cheng Shao-chieh	(Thailand) Soratja Chansrisukot	(China) Li Shasha
Women's singles	(Chinese Taipei) Cheng Shao-chieh	(Thailand) Soratja Chansrisukot	(Thailand) Molthila Meemeak
Men's doubles	(Thailand) Phattapol Ngensrisuk (Thailand) Sudket Prapakamol	(China) Wang Wei (China) Zhang Wei	(Japan) Noriyasu Hirata (Japan) Hajime Komiyama
Men's doubles	(Thailand) Phattapol Ngensrisuk (Thailand) Sudket Prapakamol	(China) Wang Wei (China) Zhang Wei	(Japan) Liu Zhiyuan (Japan) Koichi Saeki
Women's doubles	(China) Zou Shisi (China) Li Shasha	(Thailand) Kunchala Voravichitchaikul (Thailand) Sathinee Chankrachangwong	(Chinese Taipei) Chien Hsiu-lin (Chinese Taipei) Cheng Wen-hsing
Women's doubles	(China) Zou Shisi (China) Li Shasha	(Thailand) Kunchala Voravichitchaikul (Thailand) Sathinee Chankrachangwong	(Thailand) Duanganong Aroonkesorn (Thailand) Salakjit Ponsana
Mixed doubles	(Thailand) Sudket Prapakamol (Thailand) Kunchala Voravichitchaikul	(Chinese Taipei) Tsai Chia-hsin (Chinese Taipei) Cheng Wen-hsing	(South Korea) Kim Dae-sung (South Korea) Jun Mai-sook
Mixed doubles	(Thailand) Sudket Prapakamol (Thailand) Kunchala Voravichitchaikul	(Chinese Taipei) Tsai Chia-hsin (Chinese Taipei) Cheng Wen-hsing	(Poland) Michał Łogosz (Poland) Nadieżda Kostiuczyk

=== 2008 Braga ===
Event	Gold	Silver	Bronze
Men's singles	(China) Du Pengyu	(Chinese Taipei) Liao Sheng-shiun	(Chinese Taipei) Hsieh Yu-hsing
Men's singles	(China) Du Pengyu	(Chinese Taipei) Liao Sheng-shiun	(China) Chen Tianyu
Women's singles	(China) Wang Yihan	(South Korea) Kim Mun-hee	(Indonesia) Bellaetrix Manuputty
Women's singles	(China) Wang Yihan	(South Korea) Kim Mun-hee	(China) Wang Xin
Men's doubles	(Indonesia) Mohammad Ahsan (Indonesia) Bona Septano	(South Korea) Han Ki-hoon (South Korea) Han Tae-il	(Japan) Takuma Ueda (Japan) Kazushi Yamada
Men's doubles	(Indonesia) Mohammad Ahsan (Indonesia) Bona Septano	(South Korea) Han Ki-hoon (South Korea) Han Tae-il	(China) Sun Junjie (China) Tao Jiaming
Women's doubles	(Thailand) Duanganong Aroonkesorn (Thailand) Kunchala Voravichitchaikul	(Japan) Yui Nakahara (Japan) Mayu Sekiya	(China) Ding Jiao (China) Sun Xiaoli
Women's doubles	(Thailand) Duanganong Aroonkesorn (Thailand) Kunchala Voravichitchaikul	(Japan) Yui Nakahara (Japan) Mayu Sekiya	(Indonesia) Nadya Melati (Indonesia) Devi Tika Permatasari
Mixed doubles	(Thailand) Patiphat Chalardchaleam (Thailand) Kunchala Voravichitchaikul	(Chinese Taipei) Wang Chia-min (Chinese Taipei) Wang Pei-rong	(China) Sun Junjie (China) Sun Xiaoli
Mixed doubles	(Thailand) Patiphat Chalardchaleam (Thailand) Kunchala Voravichitchaikul	(Chinese Taipei) Wang Chia-min (Chinese Taipei) Wang Pei-rong	(Indonesia) Bona Septano (Indonesia) Richi Puspita Dili
Mixed teams	China	Thailand	Poland
Mixed teams	China	Thailand	South Korea

=== 2010 Taipei ===
Event	Gold	Silver	Bronze
Men's singles	(Chinese Taipei) Hsueh Hsuan-yi	(Indonesia) Tommy Sugiarto	(South Korea) Hwang Jong-soo
Women's singles	(China) Li Xuerui	(China) Liu Xin	(Japan) Sayaka Sato
Men's doubles	(Chinese Taipei) Fang Chieh-min (Chinese Taipei) Lee Sheng-mu	(Thailand) Bodin Isara (Thailand) Maneepong Jongjit	(Poland) Hubert Pączek (Poland) Wojciech Szkudlarczyk
Women's doubles	(China) Ma Jin (China) Cheng Shu	(China) Liu Xin (China) Li Xuerui	(South Korea) Lee Da-hye (South Korea) Chang Ye-na
Mixed doubles	(Chinese Taipei) Chen Hung-ling (Chinese Taipei) Hsieh Pei-chen	(China) Huang Haitao (China) Cheng Shu	(Japan) Yuta Yamasaki (Japan) Midori Sakurai
Mixed teams	China; Chen Tianyu; Chen Yulu; Cheng Shu; Du Pengyu; Huang Haitao; Li Xuerui; Liu Fangxiao; Liu Xiaolong; Liu Xin; Ma Jin; Wei Tingxiang; Zheng Bo	Chinese Taipei; Chen Hung-ling; Cheng Shao-chieh; Chou Tien-chen; Fang Chieh-min; Hsieh Pei-chen; Hsueh Hsuan-yi; Huang Shih-han; Lee Sheng-mu; Lin Yu-lang; Pai Hsiao-ma; Tsai Pei-ling; Wang Pei-rong	Thailand; Artima Serithammarak; Bodin Isara; Chayanit Chaladchalam; Maneepong Jongjit; Nitchaon Jindapol; Pakkawat Vilailak; Pollawat Boonpan; Salinee Somsri; Suwat Phaisansomsuk; Todarat Kleebyeesoon; Thunphukkanan Ampunsuwan; Wasapon Uhamang

=== 2012 Gwangju ===
Event	Gold	Silver	Bronze
Men's singles	(China) Wen Kai	(Spain) Pablo Abián	(South Korea) Lee Dong-keun
Men's singles	(China) Wen Kai	(Spain) Pablo Abián	(Spain) Ernesto Velázquez
Women's singles	(Chinese Taipei) Tai Tzu-ying	(Chinese Taipei) Pai Hsiao-ma	(South Korea) Kim Su-yuon
Women's singles	(Chinese Taipei) Tai Tzu-ying	(Chinese Taipei) Pai Hsiao-ma	(Japan) Haruko Suzuki
Men's doubles	(South Korea) Kim Gi-jung (South Korea) Lee Yong-dae	(Chinese Taipei) Chen Chung-jen (Chinese Taipei) Lin Yen-jui	(Germany) Andreas Heinz (Germany) Max Schwenger
Men's doubles	(South Korea) Kim Gi-jung (South Korea) Lee Yong-dae	(Chinese Taipei) Chen Chung-jen (Chinese Taipei) Lin Yen-jui	(South Korea) Kang Ji-wook (South Korea) Lee Sang-joon
Women's doubles	(Japan) Miri Ichimaru (Japan) Shiho Tanaka	(Chinese Taipei) Pai Hsiao-ma (Chinese Taipei) Tai Tzu-ying	(South Korea) Lee Eun-Ah (South Korea) Lee Nu-ri
Women's doubles	(Japan) Miri Ichimaru (Japan) Shiho Tanaka	(Chinese Taipei) Pai Hsiao-ma (Chinese Taipei) Tai Tzu-ying	(Japan) Erika Sanno (Japan) Haruko Suzuki
Mixed doubles	(South Korea) Kim Gi-jung (South Korea) Kim So-yeong	(South Korea) Kang Ji-wook (South Korea) Kim Chan-mi	(Poland) Wojciech Szkudlarczyk (Poland) Agnieszka Wojtkowska
Mixed doubles	(South Korea) Kim Gi-jung (South Korea) Kim So-yeong	(South Korea) Kang Ji-wook (South Korea) Kim Chan-mi	(Japan) Shohei Hoshino (Japan) Shiho Tanaka
Mixed teams	South Korea	China	Japan
Mixed teams	South Korea	China	Chinese Taipei

=== 2014 Córdoba ===
Event	Gold	Silver	Bronze
Men's singles	(China) Gao Huan	(Malaysia) Iskandar Zulkarnain Zainuddin	(Malaysia) Mohamad Arif Abdul Latif
Men's singles	(China) Gao Huan	(Malaysia) Iskandar Zulkarnain Zainuddin	(Chinese Taipei) Hsu Jen-hao
Women's singles	(Chinese Taipei) Pai Yu-po	(China) Liu Xin	(China) Chen Xiaojia
Women's singles	(Chinese Taipei) Pai Yu-po	(China) Liu Xin	(Japan) Natsumi Shimoda
Men's doubles	(Malaysia) Mohamad Arif Abdul Latif (Malaysia) Iskandar Zulkarnain Zainuddin	(China) Guo Junjie (China) Zhang Zhijun	(Chinese Taipei) Tseng Min-hao (Chinese Taipei) Wang Chi-lin
Men's doubles	(Malaysia) Mohamad Arif Abdul Latif (Malaysia) Iskandar Zulkarnain Zainuddin	(China) Guo Junjie (China) Zhang Zhijun	(Chinese Taipei) Hsu Jen-hao (Chinese Taipei) Lin Yu-hsien
Women's doubles	(China) Ou Dongni (China) Tang Yuanting	(Japan) Mirai Shinoda (Japan) Natsumi Uratani	(South Korea) Kang Ga-hui (South Korea) Kim Chan-mi
Women's doubles	(China) Ou Dongni (China) Tang Yuanting	(Japan) Mirai Shinoda (Japan) Natsumi Uratani	(Chinese Taipei) Hsieh Pei-chen (Chinese Taipei) Wu Ti-jung
Mixed doubles	(China) Liu Cheng (China) Tang Yuanting	(China) Zhang Zhijun (China) Ou Dongni	(Malaysia) Mohd Lutfi Zaim Abdul Khalid (Malaysia) Soong Fie Cho
Mixed doubles	(China) Liu Cheng (China) Tang Yuanting	(China) Zhang Zhijun (China) Ou Dongni	(Malaysia) Vountus Indra Mawan (Malaysia) Lee Meng Yean
Mixed teams	China	Malaysia	Chinese Taipei
Mixed teams	China	Malaysia	South Korea

=== 2016 Ramenskoye ===
Event	Gold	Silver	Bronze
Men's singles	(Chinese Taipei) Wang Tzu-wei	(Malaysia) Zulfadli Zulkiffli	(China) Guo Kai
Men's singles	(Chinese Taipei) Wang Tzu-wei	(Malaysia) Zulfadli Zulkiffli	(Chinese Taipei) Lin Yu-hsien
Women's singles	(Japan) Ayaho Sugino	(Chinese Taipei) Chiang Ying-li	(Chinese Taipei) Hsu Ya-ching
Women's singles	(Japan) Ayaho Sugino	(Chinese Taipei) Chiang Ying-li	(Japan) Rena Miyaura
Men's doubles	(South Korea) Choi Sol-gyu (South Korea) Kim Jae-hwan	(Chinese Taipei) Lee Jhe-huei (Chinese Taipei) Lee Yang	(Thailand) Wannawat Ampunsuwan (Thailand) Tinn Isriyanet
Men's doubles	(South Korea) Choi Sol-gyu (South Korea) Kim Jae-hwan	(Chinese Taipei) Lee Jhe-huei (Chinese Taipei) Lee Yang	(Thailand) Trawut Potieng (Thailand) Nanthakarn Yordphaisong
Women's doubles	(China) Du Peng (China) Huang Dongping	(South Korea) Lee Seung-hee (South Korea) Yoon Tae-kyung	(Russia) Evgeniya Kosetskaya (Russia) Ksenia Polikarpova
Women's doubles	(China) Du Peng (China) Huang Dongping	(South Korea) Lee Seung-hee (South Korea) Yoon Tae-kyung	(Malaysia) Chow Mei Kuan (Malaysia) Goh Yea Ching
Mixed doubles	(Chinese Taipei) Lee Yang (Chinese Taipei) Hsu Ya-ching	(Malaysia) Mohd Lutfi Zaim Abdul Khalid (Malaysia) Shevon Jemie Lai	(China) Li Jinqiu (China) Du Peng
Mixed doubles	(Chinese Taipei) Lee Yang (Chinese Taipei) Hsu Ya-ching	(Malaysia) Mohd Lutfi Zaim Abdul Khalid (Malaysia) Shevon Jemie Lai	(Malaysia) Nur Mohd Azriyn Ayub (Malaysia) Chow Mei Kuan
Mixed teams	Chinese Taipei	China	Russia
Mixed teams	Chinese Taipei	China	South Korea

=== 2018 Kuala Lumpur ===
Event	Gold	Silver	Bronze
Men's singles	(China) Ren Pengbo	(Chinese Taipei) Lin Chun-yi	(China) Lin Guipu
Men's singles	(China) Ren Pengbo	(Chinese Taipei) Lin Chun-yi	(Malaysia) Satheishtharan Ramachandran
Women's singles	(Chinese Taipei) Hung Yi-ting	(South Korea) Lee Da-hui	(Singapore) Grace Chua
Women's singles	(Chinese Taipei) Hung Yi-ting	(South Korea) Lee Da-hui	(South Korea) Jung Hyun-ji
Men's doubles	(Malaysia) Nur Mohd Azriyn Ayub (Malaysia) Low Juan Shen	(South Korea) Kim Hwi-tae (South Korea) Kim Jae-hwan	(China) Huang Kaixiang (China) Ren Xiangyu
Men's doubles	(Malaysia) Nur Mohd Azriyn Ayub (Malaysia) Low Juan Shen	(South Korea) Kim Hwi-tae (South Korea) Kim Jae-hwan	(Chinese Taipei) Po Li-wei (Chinese Taipei) Yang Ming-tse
Women's doubles	(Chinese Taipei) Chang Hsin-tien (Chinese Taipei) Yu Chien-hui	(Chinese Taipei) Chang Ching-hui (Chinese Taipei) Yang Ching-tun	(South Korea) Hwang Hyun-jeong (South Korea) Lee Ha-na
Women's doubles	(Chinese Taipei) Chang Hsin-tien (Chinese Taipei) Yu Chien-hui	(Chinese Taipei) Chang Ching-hui (Chinese Taipei) Yang Ching-tun	(South Korea) Jung Hyun-ji (South Korea) Lee Ye-na
Mixed doubles	(Chinese Taipei) Yang Ming-tse (Chinese Taipei) Chang Hsin-tien	(Chinese Taipei) Lee Fang-jen (Chinese Taipei) Yu Chien-hui	(China) Huang Kaixiang (China) Du Peng
Mixed doubles	(Chinese Taipei) Yang Ming-tse (Chinese Taipei) Chang Hsin-tien	(Chinese Taipei) Lee Fang-jen (Chinese Taipei) Yu Chien-hui	(China) Ren Xiangyu (China) Tan Yue
Mixed teams	Thailand	China	Chinese Taipei
Mixed teams	Thailand	China	South Korea

== See also ==
- Badminton at the Summer Universiade
