= Richi Puspita Dili =

Indonesian badminton player

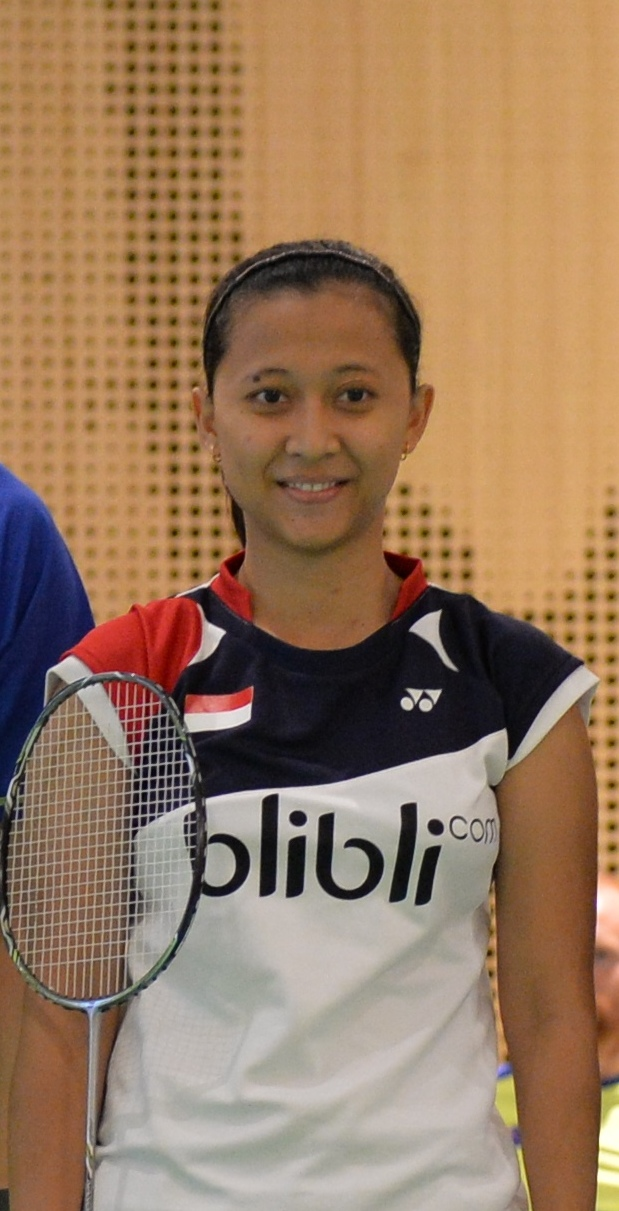

Personal information
- Born: 10 July 1989 (age 37) Sleman, Yogyakarta, Indonesia
- Height: 1.65 m (5 ft 5 in)
- Weight: 57 kg (126 lb)

Sport
- Country: Indonesia
- Sport: Badminton
- Handedness: Right

Women's & mixed doubles
- Highest ranking: 8 (XD with Riky Widianto 18 June 2015)
- BWF profile
Medal record
Women's badminton
Representing Indonesia
SEA Games
| Bronze medal – third place | 2015 Singapore | Mixed doubles |
| Bronze medal – third place | 2015 Singapore | Women's team |
Summer Universiade
| Bronze medal – third place | 2007 Bangkok | Mixed team |
World University Championships
| Bronze medal – third place | 2008 Braga | Mixed doubles |
Asian Junior Championships
| Gold medal – first place | 2007 Kuala Lumpur | Girls' doubles |
| Bronze medal – third place | 2006 Kuala Lumpur | Mixed team |
| Bronze medal – third place | 2007 Kuala Lumpur | Mixed team |

Richi Puspita Dili (born 10 July 1989) is an Indonesian doubles specialist badminton player. She won the girls' doubles title at the 2007 Asian Junior Championships.

== Career ==
Richi Puspita Dili was a member of SGS PLN Bandung club. In 2007, she won the girls' doubles title at the Asian Junior Championships partnered with Debby Susanto. She educated at the Trisakti University, and represented Indonesia in the 2007 Summer Universiade by winning a bronze medal in the team event, and at the 2008 World University Championships, also winning a bronze in the mixed doubles with Bona Septano.

In 2015, she won a Grand Prix Gold title in Syed Modi International tournament partnered with Riky Widianto.

== Achievements ==
=== SEA Games ===
Mixed doubles
| Year | Venue | Partner | Opponent | Score | Result |
|---|---|---|---|---|---|
| 2015 | Singapore Indoor Stadium, Singapore | (Indonesia) Riky Widianto | (Malaysia) Chan Peng Soon (Malaysia) Goh Liu Ying | 18–21, 21–18, 20–22 | Bronze |

=== World University Championships ===
Mixed doubles
| Year | Venue | Partner | Opponent | Score | Result |
|---|---|---|---|---|---|
| 2008 | University of Minho; Braga, Portugal | (Indonesia) Bona Septano | (Thailand) Patiphat Chalardchaleam (Thailand) Kunchala Voravichitchaikul | 21–16, 19–21, 18–21 | Bronze |

=== Asian Junior Championships ===
Girls' doubles
| Year | Venue | Partner | Opponent | Score | Result |
|---|---|---|---|---|---|
| 2007 | Stadium Juara; Kuala Lumpur, Malaysia | (Indonesia) Debby Susanto | (Malaysia) Lyddia Cheah (Malaysia) Tee Jing Yi | 21–12, 15–21, 21–18 | Gold |

=== BWF Superseries (2 runners-up) ===
The BWF Superseries, which was launched on 14 December 2006 and implemented in 2007, was a series of elite badminton tournaments, sanctioned by the Badminton World Federation (BWF). BWF Superseries levels were Superseries and Superseries Premier. A season of Superseries consisted of twelve tournaments around the world that had been introduced since 2011. Successful players were invited to the Superseries Finals, which were held at the end of each year.

Mixed doubles
| Year | Tournament | Partner | Opponent | Score | Result |
|---|---|---|---|---|---|
| 2014 | Singapore Open | (Indonesia) Riky Widianto | (Indonesia) Tontowi Ahmad (Indonesia) Liliyana Natsir | 15–21, 20–22 | (silver) Runner-up |
| 2016 | India Open | (Indonesia) Riky Widianto | (China) Lu Kai (China) Huang Yaqiong | 13–21, 16–21 | (silver) Runner-up |

BWF Super Series Finals tournament
BWF Super Series Premier tournament
BWF Super Series tournament

=== BWF Grand Prix (3 titles, 2 runners-up) ===
The BWF Grand Prix had two levels, the Grand Prix and Grand Prix Gold. It was a series of badminton tournaments sanctioned by the Badminton World Federation (BWF) and played between 2007 and 2017.

Mixed doubles
| Year | Tournament | Partner | Opponent | Score | Result |
|---|---|---|---|---|---|
| 2013 | New Zealand Open | (Indonesia) Riky Widianto | (Indonesia) Praveen Jordan (Indonesia) Vita Marissa | 18–21, 8–21 | (silver) Runner-up |
| 2013 | Thailand Open | (Indonesia) Riky Widianto | (Indonesia) Markis Kido (Indonesia) Pia Zebadiah Bernadet | 21–18, 15–21, 15–21 | (silver) Runner-up |
| 2014 | Indonesian Masters | (Indonesia) Riky Widianto | (Indonesia) Muhammad Rijal (Indonesia) Vita Marissa | 21–18, 21–19 | (gold) Winner |
| 2014 | Dutch Open | (Indonesia) Riky Widianto | (Netherlands) Jorrit de Ruiter (Netherlands) Samantha Barning | 11–10, 10–11, 9–11 11–8, 11–1 | (gold) Winner |
| 2015 | Syed Modi International | (Indonesia) Riky Widianto | (India) Manu Attri (India) K. Maneesha | 21–17, 21–17 | (gold) Winner |

BWF Grand Prix Gold tournament
BWF Grand Prix tournament

=== BWF International Challenge/Series (5 titles, 2 runners-up) ===
Women's doubles
| Year | Tournament | Partner | Opponent | Score | Result |
|---|---|---|---|---|---|
| 2007 | Smiling Fish International | (Indonesia) Yulianti | (Indonesia) Samantha Lintang (Indonesia) Bellaetrix Manuputty | Walkover | (gold) Winner |
| 2007 | Vietnam International | (Indonesia) Yulianti | (South Korea) Ha Jung-eun (South Korea) Kim Min-jung | 21–17, 9–21, 21–16 | (gold) Winner |
| 2007 | Cheers Asian Satellite | (Indonesia) Yulianti | (South Korea) Ha Jung-eun (South Korea) Kim Min-jung | 18–21, 19–21 | (silver) Runner-up |

Mixed doubles
| Year | Tournament | Partner | Opponent | Score | Result |
|---|---|---|---|---|---|
| 2009 | Vietnam International | (Indonesia) Tontowi Ahmad | (Indonesia) Fran Kurniawan (Indonesia) Pia Zebadiah Bernadet | 21–14, 21–8 | (gold) Winner |
| 2011 | India International | (Indonesia) Riky Widianto | (Indonesia) Fran Kurniawan (Indonesia) Shendy Puspa Irawati | 15–21, 15–21 | (silver) Runner-up |
| 2012 | Osaka International | (Indonesia) Riky Widianto | (Japan) Takeshi Kamura (Japan) Koharu Yonemoto | 21–18, 13–21, 21–11 | (gold) Winner |
| 2017 | Waikato International | (Indonesia) Riky Widianto | (Chinese Taipei) Ye Hong-wei (Chinese Taipei) Teng Chun-hsun | 21–15, 26–24 | (gold) Winner |

BWF International Challenge tournament
BWF International Series tournament

=== BWF Junior International (1 title) ===
Mixed doubles
| Year | Tournament | Partner | Opponent | Score | Result | Ref. |
|---|---|---|---|---|---|---|
| 2007 | Dutch Junior | (Indonesia) Indra Viki Okvana | (Indonesia) Wifqi Windarto (Indonesia) Debby Susanto | 21–14, 21–18 | (gold) Winner | |

BWF Junior International Grand Prix tournament
BWF Junior International Challenge tournament
BWF Junior International Series tournament
BWF Junior Future Series tournament

== Performance timeline ==
=== Indonesian team ===
- Junior level

| Team event | 2006 | 2007 |
|---|---|---|
| Asia Junior Championships | Bronze | Bronze |

- Senior level

| Team Event | 2015 |
|---|---|
| SEA Games | Bronze |

| Team event | 2007 |
|---|---|
| Summer Universiade | Bronze |

=== Individual competitions ===
- Junior level

| Team event | 2007 |
|---|---|
| Asian Junior Championships | Gold (GD) |

- Senior level

| Event | 2015 |
|---|---|
| SEA Games | Bronze |

| Event | 2014 | 2015 |
|---|---|---|
| World Championships | R3 | R3 |

| Tournament | 2014 | 2015 | 2016 | Best |
|---|---|---|---|---|
BWF Superseries
| India Open | R2 | w/d | F | F (2016) |
| Singapore Open | F | R1 | A | F (2014) |

| Tournament | 2010 | 2011 | 2012 | 2013 | 2014 | 2015 | 2016 | 2017 | Best |
|---|---|---|---|---|---|---|---|---|---|
BWF Grand Prix and Grand Prix Gold
| Syed Modi International | A | R2 | w/d | —N/a | A | W | A | | W (2015) |
| New Zealand Open | —N/a | | —N/a | F | A | SF | A | QF | F (2013) |
| Thailand Open | —N/a | | R1 | F | —N/a | R2 | R1 | A | F (2013) |
| Dutch Open | A | | | | W | A | | | W (2014) |
| Indonesia Masters | SF | R1 | QF | R2 | W | R1 (WD) | SF | —N/a | W (2014) |
