= Riky Widianto =

Indonesian badminton player

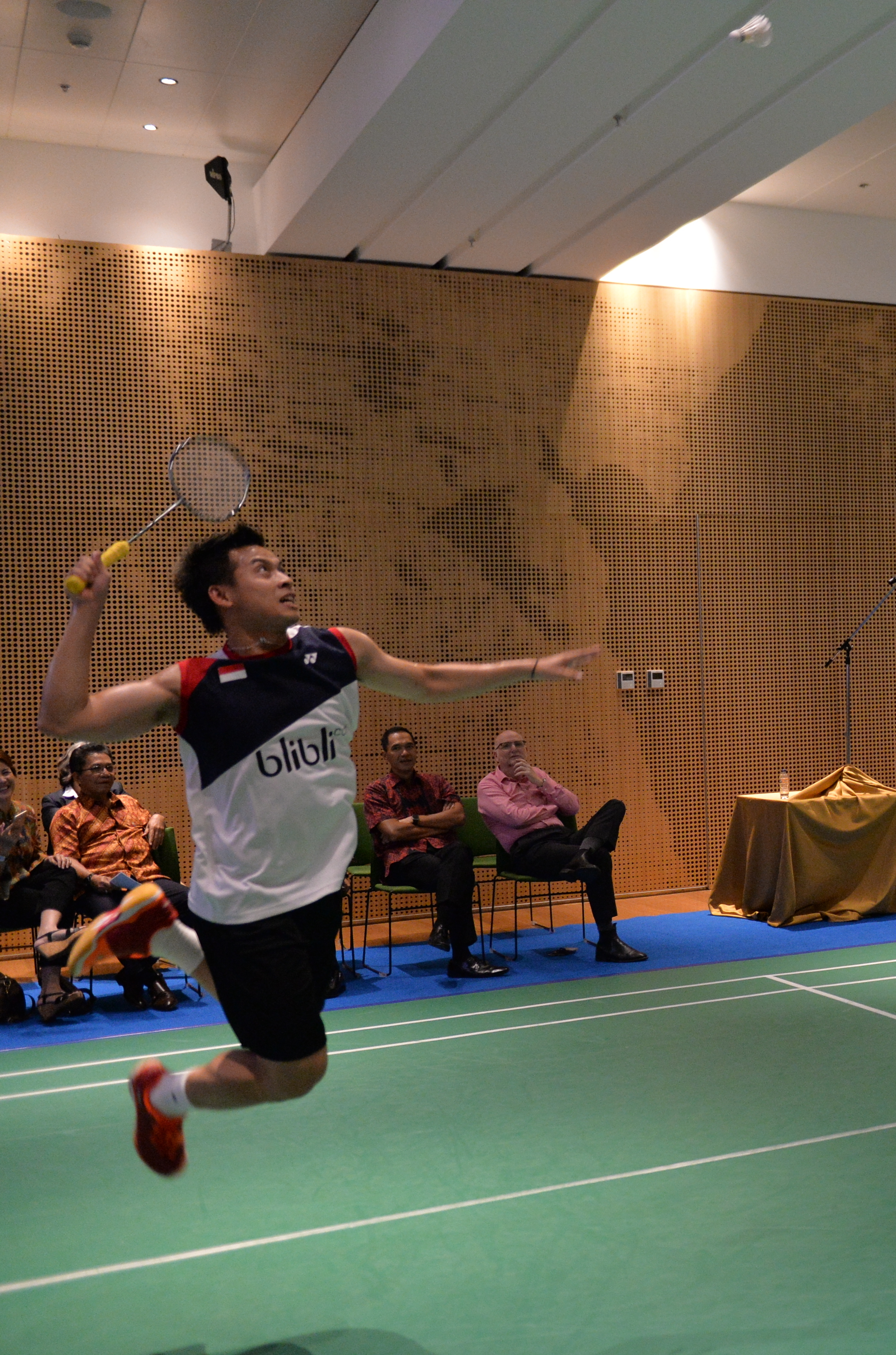

Personal information
- Born: 28 December 1991 (age 34) Surabaya, East Java, Indonesia
- Height: 1.70 m (5 ft 7 in)
- Weight: 73 kg (161 lb)

Sport
- Country: Singapore (2005–2009); Indonesia (2009–present)
- Sport: Badminton
- Handedness: Right

Mixed doubles
- Highest ranking: 8 (with Richi Puspita Dili 18 June 2015)
- BWF profile
Medal record
Men's badminton
Representing Indonesia
SEA Games
Gold medal – first place	2015 Singapore	Men's team
Bronze medal – third place	2015 Singapore	Mixed doubles
Summer Universiade
Gold medal – first place	2011 Shenzhen	Mixed team
Bronze medal – third place	2011 Shenzhen	Mixed doubles

Riky Widianto (born 28 December 1991) is an Indonesian badminton player who specializes in doubles play.

== Career ==
Widianto career as a badminton player began in 2005 when Singapore Badminton Association (SBA) invited him to join the Singapore National Badminton Team while he was a member of Wima badminton club in Surabaya, Indonesia. He played in the open tournament under the Singapore flag although he was not a Singapore citizen. In 2009, he resigned from the national team and returned to Indonesia after he rejected an SBA proposal that he take citizenship, to be eligible to participate in the upcoming SEA Games, or return. Widianto and his family felt he was too young to change citizenship at age 17, and SBA did not wish to wait two years so that he could avoid the country's mandatory National service.

After returning to Indonesia, he resumed play for his old club, Wima, until the Badminton Association of Indonesia (PBSI) invited him to join the national team in 2010. His career has grown rapidly since, especially after coach Richard Mainaky paired him with Richi Puspita Dili.

== Achievements ==
=== SEA Games ===
Mixed doubles
Year	Venue	Partner	Opponent	Score	Result
2015	Singapore Indoor Stadium, Singapore	(Indonesia) Richi Puspita Dili	(Malaysia) Chan Peng Soon (Malaysia) Goh Liu Ying	18–21, 21–18, 20–22	Bronze

=== Summer Universiade ===
Mixed doubles
Year	Venue	Partner	Opponent	Score	Result
2011	Gymnasium of SZIIT, Shenzhen, China	(Indonesia) Shendy Puspa Irawati	(Chinese Taipei) Lee Sheng-mu (Chinese Taipei) Hsieh Pei-chen	24–22, 16–21, 17–21	Bronze

=== BWF Superseries (2 runners-up) ===
The BWF Superseries, which was launched on 14 December 2006 and implemented in 2007, was a series of elite badminton tournaments, sanctioned by the Badminton World Federation (BWF). BWF Superseries levels were Superseries and Superseries Premier. A season of Superseries consisted of twelve tournaments around the world that had been introduced since 2011. Successful players were invited to the Superseries Finals, which were held at the end of each year.

Mixed doubles
Year	Tournament	Partner	Opponent	Score	Result
2014	Singapore Open	(Indonesia) Richi Puspita Dili	(Indonesia) Tontowi Ahmad (Indonesia) Liliyana Natsir	15–21, 20–22	(silver) Runner-up
2016	India Open	(Indonesia) Richi Puspita Dili	(China) Lu Kai (China) Huang Yaqiong	13–21, 16–21	(silver) Runner-up

BWF Super Series Finals tournament
BWF Super Series Premier tournament
BWF Super Series tournament

=== BWF Grand Prix (3 titles, 4 runners-up) ===
The BWF Grand Prix had two levels, the Grand Prix and Grand Prix Gold. It was a series of badminton tournaments sanctioned by the Badminton World Federation (BWF) and played between 2007 and 2017.

Mixed doubles
Year	Tournament	Partner	Opponent	Score	Result
2008	Vietnam Open	(Singapore) Vanessa Neo	(Indonesia) Tontowi Ahmad (Indonesia) Shendy Puspa Irawati	17–21, 9–21	(silver) Runner-up
2013	New Zealand Open	(Indonesia) Richi Puspita Dili	(Indonesia) Praveen Jordan (Indonesia) Vita Marissa	18–21, 8–21	(silver) Runner-up
2013	Thailand Open	(Indonesia) Richi Puspita Dili	(Indonesia) Markis Kido (Indonesia) Pia Zebadiah Bernadet	21–18, 15–21, 15–21	(silver) Runner-up
2014	Indonesian Masters	(Indonesia) Richi Puspita Dili	(Indonesia) Muhammad Rijal (Indonesia) Vita Marissa	21–18, 21–19	(gold) Winner
2014	Dutch Open	(Indonesia) Richi Puspita Dili	(Netherlands) Jorrit de Ruiter (Netherlands) Samantha Barning	11–10, 10–11, 9–11 11–8, 11–1	(gold) Winner
2015	Syed Modi International	(Indonesia) Richi Puspita Dili	(India) Manu Attri (India) K. Maneesha	21–17, 21–17	(gold) Winner
2017	Vietnam Open	(Indonesia) Masita Mahmudin	(Indonesia) Alfian Eko Prasetya (Indonesia) Melati Daeva Oktavianti	14–21, 14–21	(silver) Runner-up

BWF Grand Prix Gold tournament
BWF Grand Prix tournament

=== BWF International Challenge/Satellite/Series (5 titles, 3 runners-up) ===
Men's doubles
Year	Tournament	Partner	Opponent	Score	Result
2007	Ballarat International	(Singapore) Chayut Triyachart	(Australia) Ashley Brehaut (Australia) Aji Basuki Sindoro	16–21, 15–21	(silver) Runner-up

Mixed doubles
Year	Tournament	Partner	Opponent	Score	Result
2007	Ballarat International	(Singapore) Vanessa Neo	(Singapore) Chayut Triyachart (Singapore) Shinta Mulia Sari	21–19, 21–16	(gold) Winner
2007	Waikato International	(Singapore) Vanessa Neo	(Singapore) Chayut Triyachart (Singapore) Shinta Mulia Sari	16–21, 19–21	(silver) Runner-up
2008	Singapore Asian Satellite	(Singapore) Yao Lei	(Singapore) Chayut Triyachart (Singapore) Shinta Mulia Sari	21–17, 21–18	(gold) Winner
2009	Indonesia International	(Indonesia) Devi Tika Permatasari	(Indonesia) Irfan Fadhilah (Indonesia) Weni Anggraini	21–12, 21–18	(gold) Winner
2011	India International	(Indonesia) Richi Puspita Dili	(Indonesia) Fran Kurniawan (Indonesia) Shendy Puspa Irawati	15–21, 15–21	(silver) Runner-up
2012	Osaka International	(Indonesia) Richi Puspita Dili	(Japan) Takeshi Kamura (Japan) Koharu Yonemoto	21–18, 13–21, 21–11	(gold) Winner
2017	Waikato International	(Indonesia) Richi Puspita Dili	(Chinese Taipei) Ye Hong-wei (Chinese Taipei) Teng Chun-hsun	21–15, 26–24	(gold) Winner

BWF International Challenge tournament
BWF International Series tournament

== Performance timeline ==
=== Indonesian team ===
- Senior level

Team events	2015
SEA Games	G

Team events	2011
Summer Universiade	G

=== Individual competitions ===
- Senior level

Event	2015
SEA Games	B

Event	2011
Summer Universiade	B

Event	2013	2014	2015
World Championships	R3	R3	R3

Tournament	BWF World Tour	Best
Tournament	2018	Best
Indonesia Masters	R1	W (2014)
Indonesia Open	R1	QF (2013)
Thailand Open	R1	F (2013)
Indonesia Masters Super 100	R2	R2 (2018)

Tournament	BWF Superseries						Best
Tournament	2012	2013	2014	2015	2016	2017	Best
India Open	A		R2	w/d	F	A	F (2016)
Singapore Open	A		F	R1	A		F (2014)
Indonesia Open	R2	QF	R1	R2	R2	A	QF (2013)

Tournament	BWF Grand Prix and Grand Prix Gold											Best
Tournament	2007	2008	2009	2010	2011	2012	2013	2014	2015	2016	2017	Best
Syed Modi International	—N/a		A	R1	R2	w/d	—N/a	A	W	A		W (2015)
New Zealand Open				—N/a		—N/a	F	A	SF	A	R2 (MD); QF (XD)	F (2013)
Vietnam Open	A	QF (MD); F (XD)	R1 (MD); R2 (XD)	R1 (XD)	QF (XD)	QF (XD)	A		R2 (XD)	A	F (XD)	F (2008, 2017)
Thailand Open				—N/a		R1	F	—N/a	R2	R2	A	F (2013)
Dutch Open			A					W	A			W (2014)
Indonesian Masters	—N/a			R1	R1	QF	R2	W	R1	R1	—N/a	W (2014)
