= Arundhati Pantawane =

Indian badminton player (born 1989)

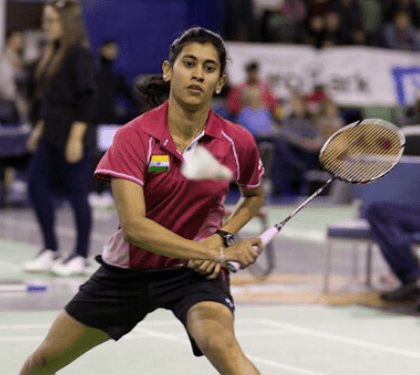

Personal information
- Born: Arundhati Pantawane; 2 September 1989 (age 37) Nagpur, Maharashtra, India
- Height: 5 ft 4 in (163 cm)
- Weight: 50 kg (110 lb)

Sport
- Country: India
- Sport: Badminton
- Handedness: Right
- Coached by: Pullela Gopichand

Women's Singles
- Highest ranking: 49 (27 June 2013)
- BWF profile

Arundhati Pantawane (born 2 September 1989) is an Indian badminton singles player. She represented India at the women's team event of the 2010 Asian Games. Among other achievements, she won gold medal at the 2011 National Games along with finishing runner-up at the 75th Senior National Badminton Championships.

== Achievements ==
=== BWF International Challenge/Series (1 title, 3 runners-up) ===
Women's singles
Year	Tournament	Opponent	Score	Result
2011	Estonian International	(New Zealand) Michelle Chan	16–21, 19–21	(silver) Runner-up
2011	Czech International	(Czech Republic) Kristina Gavnholt	10–21, 18–21	(silver) Runner-up
2012	Bahrain International	(India) Tanvi Lad	20–22, 21–12, 21–19	(gold) Winner
2014	India International Challenge	(India) Gadde Ruthvika Shivani	21–19, 18–21, 14–21	(silver) Runner-up

BWF International Challenge tournament
BWF International Series tournament
BWF Future Series tournament

== Family ==
In 2016 January, Arundhati married Kozhikode native badminton player Arun Vishnu. The couple has a son, Adharv Arun Vishnu.
