= Vanessa Neo =

Singaporean badminton player (born 1987)

Vanessa Neo 梁语嫣
Personal information
- Born: Vanessa Neo Yu Yan; 19 June 1987 (age 39) Singapore
- Height: 1.63 m (5 ft 4 in)

Sport
- Country: Singapore
- Sport: Badminton
- Handedness: Right

Women's and mixed doubles
- Highest ranking: 9 (28 February 2013)
- BWF profile
Medal record
Women's badminton
Representing Singapore
Commonwealth Games
Bronze medal – third place	2014 Glasgow	Mixed team
Asian Games
Bronze medal – third place	2006 Doha	Women's team
Southeast Asian Games
Silver medal – second place	2007 Nakhon Ratchasima	Women's team
Bronze medal – third place	2009 Vientiane	Women's team
Bronze medal – third place	2011 Jakarta	Women's team
Bronze medal – third place	2015 Singapore	Women's team

Vanessa Neo
- Traditional Chinese: 梁語嫣
- Simplified Chinese: 梁语嫣
Transcriptions
Standard Mandarin
- Hanyu Pinyin: Liáng Yǔyān

Vanessa Neo Yu Yan (born 19 June 1987) is a Singaporean former badminton player specializing in doubles. She represented Singapore in 2014 Commonwealth Games, where she won a bronze medal in the team competition.

== Achievements ==
=== BWF Grand Prix ===
The BWF Grand Prix had two levels, the Grand Prix and Grand Prix Gold. It was a series of badminton tournaments sanctioned by the Badminton World Federation (BWF) and played between 2007 and 2017.

Mixed doubles
Year	Tournament	Partner	Opponent	Score	Result
2008	Vietnam Open	(Singapore) Riky Widianto	(Indonesia) Tontowi Ahmad (Indonesia) Shendy Puspa Irawati	17–21, 9–21	(silver) Runner-up
2013	Dutch Open	(Singapore) Danny Bawa Chrisnanta	(Indonesia) Muhammad Rijal (Indonesia) Debby Susanto	21–19, 25–23	(gold) Winner
2014	Macau Open	(Singapore) Danny Bawa Chrisnanta	(Indonesia) Edi Subaktiar (Indonesia) Gloria Emanuelle Widjaja	15–21, 30–29, 20–22	(silver) Runner-up

BWF Grand Prix Gold tournament
BWF Grand Prix tournament

=== BWF International Challenge/Series ===
Women's doubles
Year	Tournament	Partner	Opponent	Score	Result
2007	Ballarat International	(Singapore) Shinta Mulia Sari	(Singapore) Frances Liu (Singapore) Yao Lei	14–21, 21–17, 21–15	(gold) Winner
2007	Waikato International	(Singapore) Shinta Mulia Sari	(Singapore) Frances Liu (Singapore) Yao Lei	11–21, 21–18, 17–21	(silver) Runner-up
2008	Vietnam International	(Singapore) Frances Liu	(Singapore) Shinta Mulia Sari (Singapore) Yao Lei	21–15, 18–21, 21–16	(gold) Winner
2011	Singapore International	(Singapore) Dellis Yuliana	(Japan) Aya Shimozaki (Japan) Emi Moue	13–21, 14–21	(silver) Runner-up
2013	Singapore International	(Singapore) Fu Mingtian	(Singapore) Shinta Mulia Sari (Singapore) Yao Lei	21–19, 15–21, 13–21	(silver) Runner-up

Mixed doubles
Year	Tournament	Partner	Opponent	Score	Result
2007	Ballarat International	(Singapore) Riky Widianto	(Singapore) Chayut Triyachart (Singapore) Shinta Mulia Sari	21–19, 21–16	(gold) Winner
2007	Waikato International	(Singapore) Riky Widianto	(Singapore) Chayut Triyachart (Singapore) Shinta Mulia Sari	16–21, 19–21	(silver) Runner-up
2008	Malaysia International	(Singapore) Danny Bawa Chrisnanta	(Malaysia) Lutfi Zaim Abdul Khalid (Malaysia) Lim Yin Loo	21–14, 17–21, 19–21	(silver) Runner-up
2010	Vietnam International	(Singapore) Hendri Saputra	(Chinese Taipei) Wang Chia-min (Chinese Taipei) Wang Pei-rong	23–21, 21–13	(gold) Winner
2011	New Zealand International	(Singapore) Danny Bawa Chrisnanta	(Japan) Takeshi Kamura (Japan) Koharu Yonemoto	21–14, 21–13	(gold) Winner
2011	White Nights	(Singapore) Danny Bawa Chrisnanta	(France) Baptiste Carême (France) Audrey Fontaine	21–18, 19–21, 21–15	(gold) Winner
2011	Singapore International	(Singapore) Danny Bawa Chrisnanta	(Malaysia) Mohd Razif Abdul Latif (Malaysia) Amelia Alicia Anscelly	23–21, 21–14	(gold) Winner
2012	Vietnam International	(Singapore) Danny Bawa Chrisnanta	(Indonesia) Hafiz Faizal (Indonesia) Pia Zebadiah Bernadet	21–11, 17–21, 17–21	(silver) Runner-up
2015	Bahrain International Challenge	(Singapore) Danny Bawa Chrisnanta	(Thailand) Bodin Isara (Thailand) Savitree Amitrapai	17–21, 19–21	(silver) Runner-up
2015	USA International	(Singapore) Danny Bawa Chrisnanta	(Germany) Michael Fuchs (Germany) Birgit Michels	16–21, 17–21	(silver) Runner-up

BWF International Challenge tournament
BWF International Series tournament
