= 2014 BWF World Championships – Women's singles =

Badminton championships

Women's singles at the 2014 BWF World Championships
- Venue: Ballerup Super Arena
- Location: Copenhagen, Denmark
- Dates: August 25, 2014 – August 31, 2014

Medalists
| gold medal | Carolina Marín | Spain |
| silver medal | Li Xuerui | China |
| bronze medal | Minatsu Mitani | Japan |
| bronze medal | P. V. Sindhu | India |

The women's singles tournament of the 2014 BWF World Championships (World Badminton Championships) took place from August 25 to 31. Ratchanok Inthanon enters as the 2013 World Champion.

== Seeds ==
1. (China) Li Xuerui (final)
2. (China) Wang Shixian (quarterfinals)
3. (China) Wang Yihan (third round)
4. (Thailand) Ratchanok Intanon (third round)
5. (South Korea) Sung Ji-hyun (quarterfinals)
6. (South Korea) Bae Youn-joo (third round)
7. (India) Saina Nehwal (quarterfinals)
8. (Chinese Taipei) Tai Tzu-ying (quarterfinals)

9. (Spain) Carolina Marín (champion)
10. (Thailand) Porntip Buranaprasertsuk (second round)
11. (India) Pusarla Venkata Sindhu (semifinals)
12. (China) Han Li (third round)
13. (Japan) Sayaka Takahashi (third round)
14. (Thailand) Nichaon Jindapon (second round)
15. (Japan) Eriko Hirose (first round, withdrew)
16. (Japan) Minatsu Mitani (semifinals)

Click on the seed number of a player to go to their draw section.

== Draw ==
=== Finals ===
Quarterfinals
1 | (China) Li Xuerui | 21 | 21
7 | (India) Saina Nehwal | 15 | 15
16 | (Japan) Minatsu Mitani | 9 | 21 | 22
5 | (South Korea) Sung Ji-hyun | 21 | 18 | 20
9 | (Spain) Carolina Marín | 19 | 21 | 21
8 | (Chinese Taipei) Tai Tzu-ying | 21 | 19 | 11
11 | (India) P. V. Sindhu | 19 | 21 | 21
2 | (China) Wang Shixian | 21 | 19 | 15

Semifinals
1 | (China) Li Xuerui | 21 | 21
16 | (Japan) Minatsu Mitani | 8 | 14
9 | (Spain) Carolina Marín | 21 | 21
11 | (India) P. V. Sindhu | 17 | 15

Final
1 | (China) Li Xuerui | 21 | 17 | 18
9 | (Spain) Carolina Marín | 17 | 21 | 21

=== Section 1 ===
First Round
(Czech Republic) K Gavnholt | 22 | 21 | 21
(United States) J Subandhi | 20 | 23 | 16
(Chinese Taipei) Pai H-m | 21 | 21
(Brazil) F Silva | 14 | 14
(New Zealand) A Rankin | 12 | 14
(Russia) N Perminova | 21 | 21
(Ukraine) M Ulitina | 21 | 20
(Bulgaria) P Nedelcheva | 23 | 22

Second Round
1 | (China) Li XR | 21 | 21
(Czech Republic) K Gavnholt | 13 | 17
12 | (China) Han L | 21 | 21
(Chinese Taipei) Pai H-m | 14 | 15
7 | (India) S Nehwal | 21 | 21
(Russia) N Perminova | 11 | 9
13 | (Japan) S Takahashi | 21 | 21
(Bulgaria) P Nedelcheva | 12 | 7

Third Round
1 | (China) Li XR | 21 | 21
12 | (China) Han L | 9 | 17
7 | (India) S Nehwal | 14 | 21 | 21
13 | (Japan) S Takahashi | 21 | 18 | 12

Quarterfinals
1 | (China) Li XR | 21 | 21
7 | (India) S Nehwal | 15 | 15

=== Section 2 ===
First Round
(Thailand) B Ongbumrungpan
(Spain) B Corrales | WO
(Nigeria) G Gabriel | 18 | 11
(Denmark) L Kjærsfeldt | 21 | 21
(England) S Walker | 21 | 19 | 21
(Malaysia) S Saniru | 18 | 21 | 12
(France) S V Waran | 18 | 21
(Indonesia) L Fanetri | 21 | 23

Second Round
4 | (Thailand) R Intanon | 21 | 21
(Spain) B Corrales | 18 | 10
16 | (Japan) M Mitani | 21 | 21
(Denmark) L Kjærsfeldt | 11 | 10
5 | (South Korea) Sung J-h | WO
(England) S Walker
14 | (Thailand) N Jindapon | 21 | 13 | 9
(Indonesia) L Fanetri | 15 | 21 | 21

Third Round
4 | (Thailand) R Intanon | 21 | 12 | 18
16 | (Japan) M Mitani | 8 | 21 | 21
5 | (South Korea) Sung J-h | 21 | 21
(Indonesia) L Fanetri | 10 | 16

Quarterfinals
16 | (Japan) M Mitani | 9 | 21 | 22
5 | (South Korea) Sung J-h | 21 | 18 | 20

=== Section 3 ===
First Round
(Canada) M Li | 28 | 21
(England) F M Chapman | 26 | 17
(Switzerland) S Jaquet | 18 | 14
(Indonesia) B Manuputty | 21 | 21
(New Zealand) M Chan K Y | 14 | 19
(Malaysia) Tee J Y | 21 | 21
(Singapore) Chen JY | 13 | 21 | 16
(Denmark) A T Madsen | 21 | 15 | 21

Second Round
(Canada) M Li | 20 | 21 | 21
10 | (Thailand) P Buranaprasertsuk | 22 | 18 | 11
(Indonesia) B Manuputty | 12 | 14
8 | (Chinese Taipei) Tai T-y | 21 | 21
(Malaysia) Tee J Y | 18 | 21 | 10
9 | (Spain) C Marín | 21 | 16 | 21
(Denmark) A T Madsen | 13 | 13
3 | (China) Wang YH | 21 | 21

Third Round
(Canada) M Li | 16 | 11
8 | (Chinese Taipei) Tai T-y | 21 | 21
9 | (Spain) C Marín | 21 | 21
3 | (China) Wang YH | 9 | 12

Quarterfinals
8 | (Chinese Taipei) Tai T-y | 21 | 19 | 11
9 | (Spain) C Marín | 19 | 21 | 21

=== Section 4 ===
First Round
(Bulgaria) L Zechiri | 13 | 12
(Russia) O Golovanova | 21 | 21
(Germany) K Schnaase | 21 | 21
(Scotland) K Gilmour | 15 | 15
(Vietnam) Vu T T | 21 | 21
(Brazil) L Vicente | 9 | 12
(Hong Kong) Yip P Y | 21 | 21
(Republic of Ireland) C Magee | 15 | 15

Second Round
(Russia) O Golovanova | 12 | 17
11 | (India) P. V. Sindhu | 21 | 21
(Germany) K Schnaase | 18 | 14
6 | (South Korea) Bae Y-j | 21 | 21
(Vietnam) Vu T T | WO
15 | (Japan) E Hirose
(Hong Kong) Yip P Y | 15 | 18
2 | (China) Wang SX | 21 | 21

Third Round
11 | (India) P. V. Sindhu | 19 | 22 | 25
6 | (South Korea) Bae Y-j | 21 | 20 | 23
(Vietnam) Vu T T | 12 | 7
2 | (China) Wang SX | 21 | 21

Quarterfinals
11 | (India) P. V. Sindhu | 19 | 21 | 21
2 | (China) Wang SX | 21 | 19 | 15
