= Badminton at the 2014 Asian Games – Women's team =

Women's team at the 2014 Asian Games
- Venue: Gyeyang Gymnasium
- Dates: 20–22 September
- Competitors: 97 from 12 nations

Medalists
gold medal	China; Bao Yixin, Li Xuerui, Liu Xin, Ma Jin, Tian Qing, Wang Shixian, Wang Xiaoli, Wang Yihan, Yu Yang, Zhao Yunlei
silver medal	South Korea; Bae Yeon-ju, Chang Ye-na, Go Ah-ra, Jung Kyung-eun, Kim Ha-na, Kim Hyo-min, Kim So-yeong, Ko Eun-byul, Sung Ji-hyun, Yoo Hae-won
bronze medal	Japan; Yui Hashimoto, Reika Kakiiwa, Miyuki Maeda, Shizuka Matsuo, Misaki Matsutomo, Minatsu Mitani, Mami Naito, Ayaka Takahashi, Sayaka Takahashi, Akane Yamaguchi
bronze medal	India; Pradnya Gadre, Tanvi Lad, Saina Nehwal, Ashwini Ponnappa, N. Sikki Reddy, P. V. Sindhu, P. C. Thulasi

The women's team badminton event at the 2014 Asian Games in Incheon took place from 20 to 22 September 2014 at Gyeyang Gymnasium.

A total of 12 teams entered the event. The teams were drawn into a knock out bracket on 21 August 2014 at the Asian Games draw ceremony.

The final of the 2014 Incheon Asian Games on 22 September was a repeat of the 2002 Busan Asian Games, with the South Korea women's team meeting China. In the end, China won the gold medal after beating South Korea in the final, Japan and India finished 3rd and won the bronze medal. China had to beat Japan three wins to one while South Korea beat India with the same score in another semifinal.

== Schedule ==
All times are Korea Standard Time (UTC+09:00)

Date	Time	Event
Saturday, 20 September 2014	09:00	Round of 16
Saturday, 20 September 2014	18:00	Quarterfinals
Sunday, 21 September 2014	18:00	Semifinals
Monday, 22 September 2014	18:30	Gold medal match

== Results ==
Round of 16
Malaysia	3
Nepal	0
Maldives	0
Indonesia	3
India	3
Macau	0
Chinese Taipei	3
Hong Kong	2

Quarterfinals
1	China	3
Malaysia	0
3	Japan	3
Indonesia	0
India	3
4	Thailand	2
Chinese Taipei	0
2	South Korea	3

Semifinals
1	China	3
3	Japan	1
India	1
2	South Korea	3

Gold medal match
1	China	3
2	South Korea	0

=== Round of 16 ===
20 September	Malaysia	3–0	Nepal

Yang Li Lian	2–0	Sara Devi Tamang	21–4, 21–11
Lim Yin Fun	2–0	Nangsal Tamang	21–2, 21–7
Lim Chiew Sien	2–0	Sichhya Shrestha	21–13, 21–9

20 September	Maldives	0–3	Indonesia

Aishath Afnaan Rasheed	0–2	Lindaweni Fanetri	6–21, 9–21
Aminath Shahurunaaz Moosa	0–2	Bellaetrix Manuputty	3–21, 3–21
Aminath Nabeeha Abdul Razzaq	0–2	Hanna Ramadini	4–21, 3–21

20 September	India	3–0	Macau

Saina Nehwal	2–0	Wong Kit Ieng	21–6, 21–4
P. V. Sindhu	2–0	U Teng Iok	21–8, 21–9
N. Sikki Reddy / Pradnya Gadre	2–0	Zhang Zhibo / Wang Rong	21–16, 21–17

20 September	Chinese Taipei	3–2	Hong Kong

Tai Tzu-ying	2–0	Yip Pui Yin	21–7, 27–25
Hsieh Pei-chen / Cheng Wen-hsing	2–0	Poon Lok Yan / Chau Hoi Wah	21–17, 21–14
Pai Hsiao-ma	1–2	Cheung Ngan Yi	14–21, 21–17, 20–22
Chen Hsiao-huan / Lai Chia-wen	0–2	Chan Tsz Ka / Tse Ying Suet	12–21, 13–21
Pai Yu-po	2–0	Cheung Ying Mei	21–10, 21–5

=== Quarterfinals ===
20 September	China	3–0	Malaysia

Li Xuerui	2–0	Tee Jing Yi	21–9, 21–8
Zhao Yunlei / Tian Qing	2–0	Vivian Hoo / Ng Hui Lin	21–18, 21–8
Wang Shixian	2–0	Yang Li Lian	21–15, 22–20

20 September	Japan	3–0	Indonesia

Minatsu Mitani	2–1	Lindaweni Fanetri	19–21, 23–21, 21–12
Ayaka Takahashi / Misaki Matsutomo	2–1	Greysia Polii / Nitya Krishinda Maheswari	21–14, 18–21, 21–19
Sayaka Takahashi	2–0	Bellaetrix Manuputty	21–18, 21–14

20 September	India	3–2	Thailand

Saina Nehwal	2–1	Ratchanok Intanon	21–15, 17–21, 21–18
P. V. Sindhu	2–0	Porntip Buranaprasertsuk	21–15, 21–13
P. C. Thulasi	0–2	Busanan Ongbamrungphan	12–21, 14–21
N. Sikki Reddy / Pradnya Gadre	1–2	Porntip Buranaprasertsuk / Kunchala Voravichitchaikul	17–21, 21–18, 16–21
Ashwini Ponnappa / P. V. Sindhu	2–0	Sapsiree Taerattanachai / Saralee Thungthongkam	21–16, 21–17

20 September	Chinese Taipei	0–3	South Korea

Tai Tzu-ying	0–2	Sung Ji-hyun	16–21, 13–21
Cheng Wen-hsing / Lai Chia-wen	0–2	Kim So-yeong / Chang Ye-na	13–21, 19–21
Pai Hsiao-ma	0–2	Bae Yeon-ju	8–21, 18–21

=== Semifinals ===
21 September	China	3–1	Japan

Li Xuerui	2–0	Minatsu Mitani	21–15, 21–17
Zhao Yunlei / Tian Qing	1–2	Ayaka Takahashi / Misaki Matsutomo	11–21, 21–15, 19–21
Wang Shixian	2–0	Sayaka Takahashi	21–15, 21–14
Yu Yang / Wang Xiaoli	2–0	Reika Kakiiwa / Miyuki Maeda	21–8, 21–13

21 September	India	1–3	South Korea

Saina Nehwal	2–1	Sung Ji-hyun	21–12, 10–21, 21–9
P. V. Sindhu	1–2	Bae Yeon-ju	21–14, 18–21, 13–21
N. Sikki Reddy / Pradnya Gadre	0–2	Kim So-yeong / Chang Ye-na	16–21, 17–21
P. C. Thulasi	0–2	Kim Hyo-min	12–21, 8–21

=== Gold medal match ===
22 September	China	3–0	South Korea

Li Xuerui	2–1	Sung Ji-hyun	17–21, 21–13, 21–16
Zhao Yunlei / Tian Qing	2–1	Kim So-yeong / Chang Ye-na	19–21, 21–7, 21–12
Wang Shixian	2–1	Bae Yeon-ju	12–21, 21–16, 21–19

== Non-participating athletes ==
- Bao Yixin (CHN)
- Liu Xin (CHN)
- Ma Jin (CHN)
- Wang Yihan (CHN)
- Chan Hung Yung (HKG)
- Suci Rizky Andini (INA)
- Liliyana Natsir (INA)
- Tiara Rosalia Nuraidah (INA)
- Debby Susanto (INA)
- Tanvi Lad (IND)
- Yui Hashimoto (JPN)
- Shizuka Matsuo (JPN)
- Mami Naito (JPN)
- Akane Yamaguchi (JPN)
- Go Ah-ra (KOR)
- Jung Kyung-eun (KOR)
- Kim Ha-na (KOR)
- Ko Eun-byul (KOR)
- Yoo Hae-won (KOR)
- Ieong Pek San (MAC)
- Amelia Alicia Anscelly (MAS)
- Lim Yin Loo (MAS)
- Soong Fie Cho (MAS)
- Woon Khe Wei (MAS)
- Maisa Fathuhulla Ismail (MDV)
- Punam Gurung (NEP)
- Savitree Amitrapai (THA)
- Duanganong Aroonkesorn (THA)
- Nitchaon Jindapol (THA)
- Puttita Supajirakul (THA)
- Hung Shih-han (TPE)
- Kuo Yu-wen (TPE)
- Wang Pei-rong (TPE)
