= 2012 Chinese Taipei Open Grand Prix Gold =

2012 Chinese Taipei Grand Prix Gold
Tournament details
- Dates: October 2, 2012 - October 7, 2012
- Total prize money: US$200,000
- Venue: Hsing Chuang Gymnasium
- Location: Taipei, Taiwan

The 2012 Chinese Taipei Open Grand Prix Gold was the eleventh grand prix gold and grand prix tournament of the 2012 BWF Grand Prix Gold and Grand Prix. The tournament was held in Hsing Chuang Gymnasium, Taipei, Taiwan October 2 until October 7, 2012 and had a total purse of $200,000.

== Men's singles ==
=== Seeds ===
1. (Japan) Kenichi Tago (withdrew)
2. (Vietnam) Nguyen Tien Minh (champion)
3. (Indonesia) Dionysius Hayom Rumbaka (withdrew)
4. (Indonesia) Tommy Sugiarto (third round)
5. (Hong Kong) Hu Yun (quarter-final)
6. (Hong Kong) Wong Wing Ki (quarter-final)
7. (Indonesia) Alamsyah Yunus (first round)
8. (Malaysia) Daren Liew (third round)

=== Finals ===
Quarterfinals
(Indonesia) Wisnu Yuli Prasetyo	19	21	21
5	(Hong Kong) Hu Yun	21	12	17
(Chinese Taipei) Hsueh Hsuan-yi	11	15
(Chinese Taipei) Chou Tien-chen	21	21
(Malaysia) Chong Wei Feng	21	21
(Malaysia) Mohd Arif Abdul Latif	14	18
6	(Hong Kong) Wong Wing Ki	17	17
2	(Vietnam) Nguyen Tien Minh	21	21

Semifinals
(Indonesia) Wisnu Yuli Prasetyo	11	21
(Chinese Taipei) Chou Tien-chen	21	23
(Malaysia) Chong Wei Feng	8	19
2	(Vietnam) Nguyen Tien Minh	21	21

Final
(Chinese Taipei) Chou Tien-chen	11	17
2	(Vietnam) Nguyen Tien Minh	21	21

=== Top half ===
==== Section 1 ====
First Round
1	(Japan) K Tago
BYE
(Chinese Taipei) Chu H-c
(Malaysia) Chan KB	wo
(Malaysia) Chiang JS	21	22
(Chinese Taipei) Hung C-c	19	20
(Indonesia) W Prasetyo	21	21
(Macau) A De Assis	9	3

Second Round
1	(Japan) K Tago	wo
(Chinese Taipei) Chu H-c
(Malaysia) Chiang JS	16	14
(Indonesia) W Prasetyo	21	21

Third Round
(Chinese Taipei) Chu H-c	13	17
(Indonesia) W Prasetyo	21	21

==== Section 2 ====
First Round
5	(Hong Kong) Hu Y
BYE
(Chinese Taipei) Teng S-h	17	16
(Hong Kong) Ng KL	21	21
(Chinese Taipei) Wang T-w	21	10	13
(Singapore) R Gonansa	17	21	21
(Macau) Lei IM	14	10
(Singapore) Loh KY	21	21

Second Round
5	(Hong Kong) Hu Y	18	21	21
(Hong Kong) Ng KL	21	17	14
(Singapore) R Gonansa	21	21
(Singapore) Loh KY	15	13

Third Round
5	(Hong Kong) Hu Y	21	21
(Singapore) R Gonansa	13	16

==== Section 3 ====
First Round
3	(Indonesia) D Rumbaka
BYE
(Chinese Taipei) Wan C-h
(Malaysia) Kuan BH	wo
(Malaysia) Chong LQ	wo
(Chinese Taipei) Hsueh H-y
(Singapore) D Wong	21	21
(Chinese Taipei) Hsu J-t	19	17

Second Round
3	(Indonesia) D Rumbaka	wo
(Chinese Taipei) Wan C-h
(Chinese Taipei) Hsueh H-y	7	21	21
(Singapore) D Wong	21	18	17

Third Round
(Chinese Taipei) Wan C-h	16	17
(Chinese Taipei) Hsueh H-y	21	21

==== Section 4 ====
First Round
8	(Malaysia) D Liew
BYE
(Malaysia) Z Zulkiffli	21	21
(Chinese Taipei) Lin C-h	15	7
(Macau) J Lo	6	5
(Chinese Taipei) Chou T-c	21	21
(Chinese Taipei) Hsu S-w	14	21	21
(Malaysia) R Misbun	21	19	15

Second Round
8	(Malaysia) D Liew	19	21	21
(Malaysia) Z Zulkiffli	21	16	18
(Chinese Taipei) Chou T-c	21	21
(Chinese Taipei) Hsu S-w	13	15

Third Round
8	(Malaysia) D Liew	11	21	14
(Chinese Taipei) Chou T-c	21	16	21

=== Bottom half ===
==== Section 5 ====
First Round
(New Zealand) J Wu	11	11
(Hong Kong) Chan YK	21	21
(Indonesia) S Kuncoro	wo
(Chinese Taipei) Lin Y-h
(Malaysia) H Hashim	wo
(Chinese Taipei) Shih K-c
(Malaysia) Chong WF	18	21	21
7	(Indonesia) A Yunus	21	10	16

Second Round
(Hong Kong) Chan YK	21	22	10
(Chinese Taipei) Lin Y-h	13	24	21
(Chinese Taipei) Shih K-c	16	11
(Malaysia) Chong WF	21	21

Third Round
(Chinese Taipei) Lin Y-h	16	22	19
(Malaysia) Chong WF	21	20	21

==== Section 6 ====
First Round
(Indonesia) S Setia Putra	wo
(Chinese Taipei) Hsieh P-h
(Malaysia) A Abdul Latif	21	21
(Chinese Taipei) Hsu J-h	17	12
(Chinese Taipei) Lan W-h	19	21	13
(Malaysia) Woon KH	21	16	21
BYE
4	(Indonesia) T Sugiarto

Second Round
(Chinese Taipei) Hsieh P-h	18	13
(Malaysia) A Abdul Latif	21	21
(Malaysia) Woon KH	16	14
4	(Indonesia) T Sugiarto	21	21

Third Round
(Malaysia) A Abdul Latif	21	21
4	(Indonesia) T Sugiarto	16	10

==== Section 7 ====
First Round
(Hong Kong) Tam CH	21	23
(Malaysia) Goh SH	19	21
(Singapore) A Chen	21	21
(Chinese Taipei) Tsai M-j	19	15
(Chinese Taipei) Lin Y-j
(Malaysia) K Yogendran	wo
BYE
6	(Hong Kong) Wong WK

Second Round
(Hong Kong) Tam CH	19	13
(Singapore) A Chen	21	21
(Chinese Taipei) Lin Y-j	12	12
6	(Hong Kong) Wong WK	21	21

Third Round
(Singapore) A Chen	16	16
6	(Hong Kong) Wong WK	21	21

==== Section 8 ====
First Round
(Malaysia) I Zainuddin	21	21
(Chinese Taipei) Lu C-y	11	14
(Chinese Taipei) Yang C-h	21	21
(Macau) Wong CC	7	5
(Hong Kong) Wei N	21	21
(Chinese Taipei) Lu C-h	17	14
BYE
2	(Vietnam) Nguyen TM

Second Round
(Malaysia) I Zainuddin	21	21
(Chinese Taipei) Yang C-h	12	19
(Hong Kong) Wei N	19	15
2	(Vietnam) Nguyen TM	21	21

Third Round
(Malaysia) I Zainuddin	17	17
2	(Vietnam) Nguyen TM	21	21

== Women's singles ==
=== Seeds ===
1. (Chinese Taipei) Tai Tzu-ying (champion)
2. (Singapore) Gu Juan (quarter-final)
3. (Hong Kong) Yip Pui Yin (semi-final)
4. (Chinese Taipei) Pai Hsiao-ma (semi-final)
5. (Hong Kong) Chan Tsz Ka (first round)
6. (Singapore) Xing Aiying (first round)
7. (Indonesia) Hera Desi (quarter-final)
8. (Malaysia) Tee Jing Yi (second round)

=== Finals ===
Semifinals
1	(Chinese Taipei) Tai Tzu-ying	18	21	21
3	(Hong Kong) Yip Pui Yin	21	10	9
4	(Chinese Taipei) Pai Hsiao-ma	14	21	10
(Indonesia) Lindaweni Fanetri	21	19	21

Final
1	(Chinese Taipei) Tai Tzu-ying	21	20	22
(Indonesia) Lindaweni Fanetri	19	22	20

=== Top half ===
==== Section 1 ====
First Round
1	(Chinese Taipei) Tai T-y	21	21
PFQ	(Chinese Taipei) Lin Y-c	15	17
(Chinese Taipei) Chang Y-l	16	13
(Indonesia) M Nadhir	21	21
7	(Indonesia) H Desi	21	12	21
(Malaysia) L Cheah	7	21	16
(Hong Kong) Chan HY	17	16
(Chinese Taipei) Hung S-h	21	21

Second Round
1	(Chinese Taipei) Tai T-y	21	21
(Indonesia) M Nadhir	19	17
7	(Indonesia) H Desi	21	21
(Chinese Taipei) Hung S-h	10	14

Quarterfinals
1	(Chinese Taipei) Tai T-y	24	21
7	(Indonesia) H Desi	22	10

==== Section 2 ====
First Round
3	(Hong Kong) Yip PY	21	21
(Vietnam) Vu TT	7	14
Q3	(Chinese Taipei) Lee C-h	20	15
(Malaysia) S Saniru	22	21
6	(Singapore) Xing AY	14	21	17
(Chinese Taipei) Hsu Y-c	21	10	21
(Chinese Taipei) Chiang P-h	22	21
Q1	(Chinese Taipei) Liu H-j	20	12

Second Round
3	(Hong Kong) Yip PY	21	21
(Malaysia) S Saniru	18	15
(Chinese Taipei) Hsu Y-c	21	21
(Chinese Taipei) Chiang P-h	12	14

Quarterfinals
3	(Hong Kong) Yip PY	21	21
(Chinese Taipei) Hsu Y-c	10	13

=== Bottom half ===
==== Section 3 ====
First Round
(Hong Kong) Mong KY	16	16
(Singapore) Chen JY	21	21
(Chinese Taipei) Pai Y-p	22	21
5	(Hong Kong) Chan TK	20	17
(Malaysia) S Cheah	21	19	13
(Chinese Taipei) Cheng C-y	14	21	21
(Hong Kong) Cheung NY	14	18
4	(Chinese Taipei) Pai H-m	21	21

Second Round
(Singapore) Chen JY	19	17
(Chinese Taipei) Pai Y-p	21	21
(Chinese Taipei) Cheng C-y	16	21	13
4	(Chinese Taipei) Pai H-m	21	18	21

Quarterfinals
(Chinese Taipei) Pai Y-p	20	19
4	(Chinese Taipei) Pai H-m	22	21

==== Section 4 ====
First Round
(Chinese Taipei) Tai C-c	9	7
(Indonesia) L Fanetri	21	21
(Chinese Taipei) Chen H-h	17	21	17
8	(Malaysia) Tee JY	21	17	21
Q4	(Chinese Taipei) Chiu Y-j	21	23	21
(Singapore) Liang XY	18	25	10
Q2	(Chinese Taipei) Chen S-y	18	18
2	(Singapore) Gu J	21	21

Second Round
(Indonesia) L Fanetri	21	18	21
8	(Malaysia) Tee JY	17	21	9
Q4	(Chinese Taipei) Chiu Y-j	10	12
2	(Singapore) Gu J	21	21

Quarterfinals
(Indonesia) L Fanetri	21	20	21
2	(Singapore) Gu J	12	22	16

== Men's doubles ==
=== Seeds ===
1. (Indonesia) Angga Pratama / Rian Agung Saputro (final)
2. (Malaysia) Mohd Zakry Abdul Latif / Mohd Fairuzizuan Mohd Tazari (champion)
3. (Indonesia) Ricky Karanda Suwardi / Muhammad Ulinnuha (quarter-final)
4. (Indonesia) Markus Fernaldi Gideon / Agripinna Prima Rahmanto Putra (first round)

=== Finals ===
Semifinals
1	(Indonesia) Angga Pratama (Indonesia) Rian Agung Saputro	25	21
(Malaysia) Chooi Kah Ming (Malaysia) Ow Yao Han	23	18
(Chinese Taipei) Chen Hung-ling (Chinese Taipei) Lu Chia-bin	13	15
2	(Malaysia) Mohd Zakry Abdul Latif (Malaysia) Mohd Fairuzizuan Mohd Tazari	21	21

Final
1	(Indonesia) Angga Pratama (Indonesia) Rian Agung Saputro	12	14
2	(Malaysia) Mohd Zakry Abdul Latif (Malaysia) Mohd Fairuzizuan Mohd Tazari	21	21

=== Top half ===
==== Section 1 ====
First Round
1	(Indonesia) A Pratama (Indonesia) R Saputro
BYE
(Chinese Taipei) Tien T-c (Chinese Taipei) Yang P-h	20	24	21
(Malaysia) L Abdul Khalid (Malaysia) Teo KS	22	22	12
(Chinese Taipei) Lee S-m (Chinese Taipei) Tsai C-h	wo
(Indonesia) M Kido (Indonesia) A Yulianto
(Chinese Taipei) Wang C-l (Chinese Taipei) Wu H-l	21	21
(Hong Kong) Lee CH (Hong Kong) Ng KL	19	16

Second Round
1	(Indonesia) A Pratama (Indonesia) R Saputro	19	21	21
(Malaysia) L Abdul Khalid (Malaysia) Teo KS	21	15	14
(Indonesia) M Kido (Indonesia) A Yulianto	21	21
(Chinese Taipei) Wang C-l (Chinese Taipei) Wu H-l	17	15

Quarterfinals
1	(Indonesia) A Pratama (Indonesia) R Saputro	21	21
(Indonesia) M Kido (Indonesia) A Yulianto	16	14

==== Section 2 ====
First Round
3	(Indonesia) M Gideon (Indonesia) A Putra	15	8
(Chinese Taipei) Chen C-j (Chinese Taipei) Lin Y-j	21	21
(Macau) J Lo (Macau) Wong CC	6	6
(Chinese Taipei) Hsueh A-t (Chinese Taipei) Tsai C-y	21	21
(Singapore) A Chen (Singapore) R Gonansa	21	14	16
(Chinese Taipei) Lin Y-l (Chinese Taipei) Wang C-h	18	21	21
(Chinese Taipei) Chen W (Chinese Taipei) Liu W-c	21	20	18
(Malaysia) Chooi KM (Malaysia) Ow YH	16	22	21

Second Round
(Chinese Taipei) Chen C-j (Chinese Taipei) Lin Y-j	25	19	21
(Chinese Taipei) Hsueh A-t (Chinese Taipei) Tsai C-y	23	21	16
(Chinese Taipei) Lin Y-l (Chinese Taipei) Wang C-h	13	9
(Malaysia) Chooi KM (Malaysia) Ow YH	21	21

Quarterfinals
(Chinese Taipei) Chen C-j (Chinese Taipei) Lin Y-j	18	21	11
(Malaysia) Chooi KM (Malaysia) Ow YH	21	13	21

=== Bottom half ===
==== Section 3 ====
First Round
(Malaysia) Kok ZY (Malaysia) Kong KZ	11	10
(Chinese Taipei) Chen H-l (Chinese Taipei) Lu C-b	21	21
(Macau) A De Assis (Macau) Lei IM	3	12
(Chinese Taipei) Lu C-y (Chinese Taipei) Tseng M-h	21	21
(Chinese Taipei) Liao M-c (Chinese Taipei) Su Y-n	19	11
(Malaysia) N Heg (Malaysia) Teo EY	21	21
(Chinese Taipei) Chiu C-w (Chinese Taipei) Liao C-c	9	21	16
3	(Indonesia) R Suwardi (Indonesia) M Ulinnuha	21	18	21

Second Round
(Chinese Taipei) Chen H-l (Chinese Taipei) Lu C-b	21	21
(Chinese Taipei) Lu C-y (Chinese Taipei) Tseng M-h	8	17
(Malaysia) N Heg (Malaysia) Teo EY	15	21	12
3	(Indonesia) R Suwardi (Indonesia) M Ulinnuha	21	17	21

Quarterfinals
(Chinese Taipei) Chen H-l (Chinese Taipei) Lu C-b	21	21
3	(Indonesia) R Suwardi (Indonesia) M Ulinnuha	19	18

==== Section 4 ====
First Round
(Chinese Taipei) Liang J-w (Chinese Taipei) Liao K-h	19	21	14
(Hong Kong) Chan TK (Hong Kong) Lo LK	21	19	21
(Singapore) T Yeo (Singapore) Liu Y	21	21
(Chinese Taipei) Chang K-c (Chinese Taipei) Liao C-h	15	15
(Chinese Taipei) Lin C-y (Chinese Taipei) Wang C-m	21	21
(Hong Kong) Chan YL (Hong Kong) Leung CY	16	14
BYE
2	(Malaysia) Z Abdul Latif (Malaysia) F Tazari

Second Round
(Hong Kong) Chan TK (Hong Kong) Lo LK	21	21
(Singapore) T Yeo (Singapore) Liu Y	12	13
(Chinese Taipei) Lin C-y (Chinese Taipei) Wang C-m	11	17
2	(Malaysia) Z Abdul Latif (Malaysia) F Tazari	21	21

Quarterfinals
(Hong Kong) Chan TK (Hong Kong) Lo LK	16	16
2	(Malaysia) Z Abdul Latif (Malaysia) F Tazari	21	21

== Women's doubles ==
=== Seeds ===
1. (Singapore) Shinta Mulia Sari / Yao Lei (second round)
2. (Hong Kong) Poon Lok Yan / Tse Ying Suet (second round)
3. (Malaysia) Vivian Hoo Kah Mun / Woon Khe Wei (semi-final)
4. (Indonesia) Suci Rizki Andini / Della Destiara Haris (final)

=== Finals ===
Semifinals
(Indonesia) Gebby Ristiyani Imawan (Indonesia) Tiara Rosalia Nuraidah	8	22	15
4	(Indonesia) Suci Rizki Andini (Indonesia) Della Destiara Haris	21	20	21
3	(Malaysia) Vivian Hoo Kah Mun (Malaysia) Woon Khe Wei	15	15
(Indonesia) Pia Zebadiah (Indonesia) Rizki Amelia Pradipta	21	21

Final
4	(Indonesia) Suci Rizki Andini (Indonesia) Della Destiara Haris	15	12
(Indonesia) Pia Zebadiah (Indonesia) Rizki Amelia Pradipta	21	21

=== Top half ===
==== Section 1 ====
First Round
1	(Singapore) S Sari (Singapore) Yao L
BYE
(Chinese Taipei) Chang C-h (Chinese Taipei) Chang H-t	8	7
(Indonesia) G Imawan (Indonesia) T Nuraidah	21	21
(Chinese Taipei) Chiang P-h (Chinese Taipei) Shuai P-l
BYE
(Hong Kong) Chan HY (Hong Kong) Chau HW	22	12	17
(Chinese Taipei) Chen P-j (Chinese Taipei) Liu S-c	20	21	21

Second Round
1	(Singapore) S Sari (Singapore) Yao L	19	21	12
(Indonesia) G Imawan (Indonesia) T Nuraidah	21	16	21
(Chinese Taipei) Chiang P-h (Chinese Taipei) Shuai P-l	18	16
(Chinese Taipei) Chen P-j (Chinese Taipei) Liu S-c	21	21

Quarterfinals
(Indonesia) G Imawan (Indonesia) T Nuraidah	21	21
(Chinese Taipei) Chen P-j (Chinese Taipei) Liu S-c	9	15

==== Section 2 ====
First Round
4	(Indonesia) S Andini (Indonesia) D Haris
BYE
(Malaysia) Chin EH (Malaysia) Lim YL	21	14	21
(Chinese Taipei) Hsieh P-c (Chinese Taipei) Wang P-r	12	21	13
(Chinese Taipei) Chen S-y (Chinese Taipei) Chen T-y
BYE
(Macau) Ieong PS (Macau) Mou CI	11	10
(Chinese Taipei) Chang Y-h (Chinese Taipei) Shih Y-c	21	21

Second Round
4	(Indonesia) S Andini (Indonesia) D Haris	21	20	21
(Malaysia) Chin EH (Malaysia) Lim YL	13	22	15
(Chinese Taipei) Chen S-y (Chinese Taipei) Chen T-y	22	21
(Chinese Taipei) Chang Y-h (Chinese Taipei) Shih Y-c	20	16

Quarterfinals
4	(Indonesia) S Andini (Indonesia) D Haris	21	21
(Chinese Taipei) Chen S-y (Chinese Taipei) Chen T-y	13	9

=== Bottom half ===
==== Section 3 ====
First Round
(Chinese Taipei) Huang M-c (Chinese Taipei) Kuo Y-w	21	21
(Singapore) Chen JY (Singapore) Xing AY	19	11
(Chinese Taipei) Chiang K-h (Chinese Taipei) Tsai P-l
(Macau) Wang R (Macau) Zhang ZB	wo
(Hong Kong) Shek HY (Hong Kong) Yeung YK	21	11	18
(Chinese Taipei) Chien Y-c (Chinese Taipei) Wu T-j	19	21	21
BYE
3	(Malaysia) V Hoo (Malaysia) Woon KW

Second Round
(Chinese Taipei) Huang M-c (Chinese Taipei) Kuo Y-w	21	15	21
(Chinese Taipei) Chiang K-h (Chinese Taipei) Tsai P-l	13	21	15
(Chinese Taipei) Chien Y-c (Chinese Taipei) Wu T-j	17	18
3	(Malaysia) V Hoo (Malaysia) Woon KW	21	21

Quarterfinals
(Chinese Taipei) Huang M-c (Chinese Taipei) Kuo Y-w	12	7
3	(Malaysia) V Hoo (Malaysia) Woon KW	21	21

==== Section 4 ====
First Round
(Singapore) V Neo (Singapore) D Yuliana	21	21
(Chinese Taipei) Lin H-y (Chinese Taipei) Lin S-y	16	12
BYE
(Chinese Taipei) Hung S-c (Chinese Taipei) Wu F-c
(Chinese Taipei) Chou C-c (Chinese Taipei) Yang C-c	13	21	11
(Indonesia) P Zebadiah (Indonesia) R Pradipta	21	17	21
BYE
2	(Hong Kong) Poon LY (Hong Kong) Tse YS

Second Round
(Singapore) V Neo (Singapore) D Yuliana	16	18
(Chinese Taipei) Hung S-c (Chinese Taipei) Wu F-c	21	21
(Indonesia) P Zebadiah (Indonesia) R Pradipta	15	21	21
2	(Hong Kong) Poon LY (Hong Kong) Tse YS	21	17	11

Quarterfinals
(Chinese Taipei) Hung S-c (Chinese Taipei) Wu F-c	17	16
(Indonesia) P Zebadiah (Indonesia) R Pradipta	21	21

== Mixed doubles ==
=== Seeds ===
1. (Indonesia) Muhammad Rijal / Debby Susanto (champion)
2. (Singapore) Danny Bawa Chrisnanta / Vanessa Neo Yu Yan (quarter-final)
3. (Indonesia) Irfan Fadhilah / Weni Anggraini (second round)
4. (Indonesia) Riky Widianto / Richi Puspita Dili (semi-final)

=== Finals ===
Semifinals
1	(Indonesia) Muhammad Rijal (Indonesia) Debby Susanto	21	21
4	(Indonesia) Riky Widianto (Indonesia) Richi Puspita Dili	14	15
(Hong Kong) Lee Chun Hei (Hong Kong) Chau Hoi Wah	20	21	21
(Malaysia) Ong Jian Guo (Malaysia) Woon Khe Wei	22	17	12

Final
1	(Indonesia) Muhammad Rijal (Indonesia) Debby Susanto	21	21
(Hong Kong) Lee Chun Hei (Hong Kong) Chau Hoi Wah	14	14

=== Top half ===
==== Section 1 ====
First Round
1	(Indonesia) M Rijal (Indonesia) D Susanto
BYE
(Hong Kong) Chan TK (Hong Kong) Mong KY	18	14
(Indonesia) M Kido (Indonesia) P Zebadiah	21	21
(Chinese Taipei) Liao M-c (Chinese Taipei) Chen H-h
BYE
(Singapore) Liu Y (Singapore) Thng TT	16	21	13
(Malaysia) L Abdul Khalid (Malaysia) V Hoo	21	18	21

Second Round
1	(Indonesia) M Rijal (Indonesia) D Susanto	21	21
(Indonesia) M Kido (Indonesia) P Zebadiah	8	18
(Chinese Taipei) Liao M-c (Chinese Taipei) Chen H-h	21	16	19
(Malaysia) L Abdul Khalid (Malaysia) V Hoo	17	21	21

Quarterfinals
1	(Indonesia) M Rijal (Indonesia) D Susanto	21	21
(Malaysia) L Abdul Khalid (Malaysia) V Hoo	17	13

==== Section 2 ====
First Round
3	(Indonesia) R Widianto (Indonesia) R Dili
BYE
(Chinese Taipei) Huang C-e (Chinese Taipei) Kuo Y-w	10	5
(Hong Kong) Wong WH (Hong Kong) Shek HY	21	21
(Malaysia) Tan AQ (Malaysia) Lai PJ	23	21
(Singapore) T Yeo (Singapore) S Sari	21	9
(Macau) Wong CC (Macau) Mou CI	4	10
(Hong Kong) Chan YL (Hong Kong) Tse YS	21	21

Second Round
4	(Indonesia) R Widianto (Indonesia) R Dili	21	21
(Hong Kong) Wong WH (Hong Kong) Shek HY	18	7
(Malaysia) Tan AQ (Malaysia) Lai PJ	11	21	12
(Hong Kong) Chan YL (Hong Kong) Tse YS	21	18	21

Quarterfinals
4	(Indonesia) R Widianto (Indonesia) R Dili	21	21
(Hong Kong) Chan YL (Hong Kong) Tse YS	17	18

=== Bottom half ===
==== Section 3 ====
First Round
(Singapore) Loh KY (Singapore) D Yuliana	8	12
(Chinese Taipei) Chen H-l (Chinese Taipei) Chien Y-c	21	21
(Hong Kong) Lo LK (Hong Kong) Yeung YK	21	10	15
(Singapore) D Wong (Singapore) Gu J	12	21	21
(Malaysia) Teo KS (Malaysia) Lim YL	16	16
(Hong Kong) Lee CH (Hong Kong) Chau HW	21	21
BYE
3	(Indonesia) I Fadhilah (Indonesia) W Anggraini

Second Round
(Chinese Taipei) Chen H-l (Chinese Taipei) Chien Y-c	21	21
(Singapore) D Wong (Singapore) Gu J	19	10
(Hong Kong) Lee CH (Hong Kong) Chau HW	21	21	24
3	(Indonesia) I Fadhilah (Indonesia) W Anggraini	23	10	22

Quarterfinals
(Chinese Taipei) Chen H-l (Chinese Taipei) Chien Y-c	15	21	12
(Hong Kong) Lee CH (Hong Kong) Chau HW	21	11	21

==== Section 4 ====
First Round
(Indonesia) A Yulianto (Indonesia) R Pradipta	21	18	10
(Malaysia) Ong JG (Malaysia) Woon KW	15	21	21
(Chinese Taipei) Su Y-n (Chinese Taipei) Lai C-w	21	21
(Macau) A De Assis (Macau) Ieong PS	12	13
(Chinese Taipei) Lin Y-j (Chinese Taipei) Wu T-j	14	19
(Hong Kong) Leung CY (Hong Kong) Poon LY	21	21
BYE
2	(Singapore) D Chrisnanta (Singapore) V Neo

Second Round
(Malaysia) Ong JG (Malaysia) Woon KW	21	21
(Chinese Taipei) Su Y-n (Chinese Taipei) Lai C-w	14	12
(Hong Kong) Leung CY (Hong Kong) Poon LY	11	14
2	(Singapore) D Chrisnanta (Singapore) V Neo	21	21

Quarterfinals
(Malaysia) Ong JG (Malaysia) Woon KW	21	21
2	(Singapore) D Chrisnanta (Singapore) V Neo	10	19

Preceded by 2012 Indonesia Open Grand Prix Gold	BWF Grand Prix Gold and Grand Prix; 2012 season	Succeeded by 2012 Dutch Open Grand Prix
