= 2015 BWF World Championships – Women's singles =

Badminton championships

Women's singles at the 2015 BWF World Championships
- Venue: Istora Senayan
- Location: Jakarta, Indonesia
- Dates: August 10, 2015 – August 16, 2015

Medalists
| gold medal | Carolina Marín | Spain |
| silver medal | Saina Nehwal | India |
| bronze medal | Sung Ji-hyun | South Korea |
| bronze medal | Lindaweni Fanetri | Indonesia |

The women's singles tournament of the 2015 BWF World Championships (World Badminton Championships) took place from August 10 to 16 in Jakarta, Indonesia. . Carolina Marín entered as the 2014 World Champion.

== Seeds ==
1. (Spain) Carolina Marín (champion)
2. (India) Saina Nehwal (final)
3. (China) Li Xuerui (third round)
4. (Chinese Taipei) Tai Tzu-ying (quarterfinals)
5. (Thailand) Ratchanok Intanon (third round)
6. (China) Wang Yihan (quarterfinals)
7. (China) Wang Shixian (quarterfinals)
8. (South Korea) Sung Ji-hyun (semifinals)

9. (Japan) Nozomi Okuhara (second round)
10. (South Korea) Bae Yeon-ju (third round)
11. (India) P. V. Sindhu (quarterfinals)
12. (Canada) Michelle Li (third round)
13. (Japan) Minatsu Mitani (second round)
14. (Japan) Sayaka Takahashi (third round)
15. (Thailand) Busanan Ongbumrungpan (third round)
16. (Indonesia) Maria Febe Kusumastuti (second round)

Click on the seed number of a player to go to their draw section.

== Draw ==
=== Finals ===
Quarterfinals
1 | (Spain) Carolina Marín | 21 | 21
7 | (China) Wang Shixian | 17 | 19
11 | (India) P. V. Sindhu | 17 | 21 | 16
8 | (South Korea) Sung Ji-hyun | 21 | 19 | 21
(Indonesia) Lindaweni Fanetri | 14 | 22 | 21
4 | (Chinese Taipei) Tai Tzu-ying | 21 | 20 | 12
6 | (China) Wang Yihan | 15 | 21 | 19
2 | (India) Saina Nehwal | 21 | 19 | 21

Semifinals
1 | (Spain) Carolina Marín | 21 | 15 | 21
8 | (South Korea) Sung Ji-hyun | 17 | 21 | 16
(Indonesia) Lindaweni Fanetri | 17 | 17
2 | (India) Saina Nehwal | 21 | 21

Final
1 | (Spain) Carolina Marín | 21 | 21
2 | (India) Saina Nehwal | 16 | 19

=== Section 1 ===
First Round
(Malaysia) Tee JY | 21 | 21
(Italy) J Cicognini | 13 | 8
(Turkey) N Yigit | 11 | 14
(Chinese Taipei) Pai Y-p | 21 | 21
(United States) I Wang | 21 | 21
(England) F M Chapman | 12 | 19
(France) D Lansac | 21 | 21
(Russia) N Perminova | 18 | 18

Second Round
1 | (Spain) C Marín | 19 | 21 | 21
(Malaysia) Tee JY | 21 | 14 | 13
16 | (Indonesia) M F Kusumastuti | 21 | 13 | 9
(Chinese Taipei) Pai Y-p | 18 | 21 | 21
7 | (China) Wang SX | 21 | 21
(United States) I Wang | 13 | 11
15 | (Thailand) B Ongbumrungpan | 21 | 21
(France) D Lansac | 18 | 9

Third Round
1 | (Spain) C Marín | 21 | 18 | 21
(Chinese Taipei) Pai Y-p | 11 | 21 | 17
7 | (China) Wang SX | 24 | 21
15 | (Thailand) B Ongbumrungpan | 22 | 11

Quarterfinals
1 | (Spain) C Marín | 21 | 21
7 | (China) Wang SX | 17 | 19

=== Section 2 ===
First Round
(Bulgaria) P Nedelcheva | 13 | 22 | 21
(Canada) R Honderich | 21 | 20 | 13
(Denmark) L Kjaersfeldt | 21 | 21
(Republic of Ireland) C Magee | 18 | 10
(Australia) J Lai | 11 | 12
(Hong Kong) Yip PY | 21 | 21
(Thailand) P Buranaprasertsuk | 21 | 23
(Scotland) K Gilmour | 15 | 21

Second Round
3 | (China) Li XR | 21 | 21
(Bulgaria) P Nedelcheva | 10 | 11
11 | (India) P. V. Sindhu | 11 | 21 | 21
(Denmark) L Kjaersfeldt | 21 | 17 | 16
8 | (South Korea) Sung J-h | 21 | 21
(Hong Kong) Yip PY | 14 | 16
9 | (Japan) N Okuhara | 12 | 21 | 14
(Thailand) P Buranaprasertsuk | 21 | 17 | 21

Third Round
3 | (China) Li XR | 17 | 21 | 17
11 | (India) P. V. Sindhu | 21 | 14 | 21
8 | (South Korea) Sung J-h | 21 | 21
(Thailand) P Buranaprasertsuk | 9 | 16

Quarterfinals
11 | (India) P. V. Sindhu | 17 | 21 | 16
8 | (South Korea) Sung J-h | 21 | 19 | 21

=== Section 3 ===
First Round
(Netherlands) S Eijbergen | 13 | 15
(Indonesia) L Fanetri | 21 | 21
(Malaysia) L Cheah | 23 | 13
(Turkey) O Bayrak | 25 | 21
(United States) R Schafer | 16 | 22 | 21
(Spain) B Corrales | 21 | 20 | 17
(Singapore) Chen JY | 21 | 21
(Russia) K Polikarpova | 14 | 9

Second Round
(Indonesia) L Fanetri | 19 | 21 | 21
13 | (Japan) M Mitani | 21 | 14 | 11
(Turkey) O Bayrak | 14 | 9
5 | (Thailand) R Intanon | 21 | 21
(United States) R Schafer | 13 | 21 | 11
12 | (Canada) M Li | 21 | 16 | 21
(Singapore) Chen JY | 18 | 11
4 | (Chinese Taipei) Tai T-y | 21 | 21

Third Round
(Indonesia) L Fanetri | 24 | 21 | 5
5 | (Thailand) R Intanon | 26 | 10 | 8^{r}
12 | (Canada) M Li | 15 | 19
4 | (Chinese Taipei) Tai T-y | 21 | 21

Quarterfinals
(Indonesia) L Fanetri | 14 | 22 | 21
4 | (Chinese Taipei) Tai T-y | 21 | 20 | 12

=== Section 4 ===
First Round
(Bulgaria) L Zechiri | 21 | 11 | 21
(Germany) K Schnaase | 18 | 21 | 18
(Nigeria) G Gabriel | 10 | 5
(Vietnam) Vu TT | 21 | 21
(Switzerland) S Jaquet | 21 | 21
(Ukraine) M Ulitina | 11 | 17
(Hong Kong) Cheung NY | 21 | 21
(Estonia) K Tolmoff | 15 | 11

Second Round
(Bulgaria) L Zechiri | 14 | 21 | 8
10 | (South Korea) Bae Y-j | 21 | 21 | 21
(Vietnam) Vu TT | 18 | 21 | 12
6 | (China) Wang YH | 21 | 17 | 21
(Switzerland) S Jaquet | 8 | 17
14 | (Japan) S Takahashi | 21 | 21
(Hong Kong) Cheung NY | 13 | 9
2 | (India) S Nehwal | 21 | 21

Third Round
10 | (South Korea) Bae Y-j | 21 | 18 | 8
6 | (China) Wang YH | 17 | 21 | 21
14 | (Japan) S Takahashi | 18 | 14
2 | (India) S Nehwal | 21 | 21

Quarterfinals
6 | (China) Wang YH | 15 | 21 | 19
2 | (India) S Nehwal | 21 | 19 | 21
