= Badminton at the 2014 Asian Games – Women's singles =

Women's singles at the 2014 Asian Games
- Venue: Gyeyang Gymnasium
- Dates: 24–28 September
- Competitors: 31 from 16 nations

Medalists
gold medal	Wang Yihan	China
silver medal	Li Xuerui	China
bronze medal	Tai Tzu-ying	Chinese Taipei
bronze medal	Bae Yeon-ju	South Korea

The badminton women's singles tournament at the 2014 Asian Games in Incheon took place 24–28 September 2014 at Gyeyang Gymnasium.

== Schedule ==
All times are Korea Standard Time (UTC+09:00)

Date	Time	Event
Wednesday, 24 September 2014	11:00	Round of 32
Thursday, 25 September 2014	11:00	Round of 16
Friday, 26 September 2014	14:20	Quarterfinals
Saturday, 27 September 2014	15:00	Semifinals
Sunday, 28 September 2014	15:00	Gold medal match

== Results ==
Legend

- WO — Won by walkover

=== Final ===
Gold medal match
1	Li Xuerui (CHN)	21	17	7
2	Wang Yihan (CHN)	11	21	21

=== Top half ===
Round of 32
Yip Pui Yin (HKG)	21	21
Mönkhbayaryn Dulamsüren (MGL)	1	5
8	P. V. Sindhu (IND)	21	21
Wong Kit Ieng (MAC)	7	13
Bellaetrix Manuputty (INA)	21	21
Nangsal Tamang (NEP)	5	17
3	Sung Ji-hyun (KOR)	21	21
Lê Thu Huyền (VIE)	12	12
Yang Li Lian (MAS)	W	O
Maisa Fathuhulla Ismail (MDV)
7	Tai Tzu-ying (TPE)	21	21	21
Sayaka Takahashi (JPN)	23	11	15
Mahoor Shahzad (PAK)	2	9
Nitchaon Jindapol (THA)	21	21

Round of 16
1	Li Xuerui (CHN)	21	21
Yip Pui Yin (HKG)	13	15
8	P. V. Sindhu (IND)	22	16	20
Bellaetrix Manuputty (INA)	20	21	22
3	Sung Ji-hyun (KOR)	21	21
Yang Li Lian (MAS)	16	13
7	Tai Tzu-ying (TPE)	21	21
Nitchaon Jindapol (THA)	19	6

Quarterfinals
1	Li Xuerui (CHN)	21	21
Bellaetrix Manuputty (INA)	9	19
3	Sung Ji-hyun (KOR)	14	21	17
7	Tai Tzu-ying (TPE)	21	9	21

Semifinals
1	Li Xuerui (CHN)	21	24	21
7	Tai Tzu-ying (TPE)	16	26	8

=== Bottom half ===
Round of 32
Tee Jing Yi (MAS)	14	16
Akane Yamaguchi (JPN)	21	21
Cheung Ngan Yi (HKG)	19	12
5	Bae Yeon-ju (KOR)	21	21
Aishath Afnaan Rasheed (MDV)	16	15
Palwasha Bashir (PAK)	21	21
Vũ Thị Trang (VIE)	12	17
4	Ratchanok Intanon (THA)	21	21
Baataryn Khulangoo (MGL)	3	5
Sorayya Aghaei (IRI)	21	21
U Teng Iok (MAC)	10	8
6	Saina Nehwal (IND)	21	21
Pai Hsiao-ma (TPE)	21	21
Sara Devi Tamang (NEP)	10	12
Lindaweni Fanetri (INA)	16	16
2	Wang Yihan (CHN)	21	21

Round of 16
Akane Yamaguchi (JPN)	21	18	15
5	Bae Yeon-ju (KOR)	18	21	21
Palwasha Bashir (PAK)	9	5
4	Ratchanok Intanon (THA)	21	21
Sorayya Aghaei (IRI)	7	6
6	Saina Nehwal (IND)	21	21
Pai Hsiao-ma (TPE)	7	9
2	Wang Yihan (CHN)	21	21

Quarterfinals
5	Bae Yeon-ju (KOR)	21	18	21
4	Ratchanok Intanon (THA)	4	21	8
6	Saina Nehwal (IND)	21	9	7
2	Wang Yihan (CHN)	18	21	21

Semifinals
5	Bae Yeon-ju (KOR)	10	21	16
2	Wang Yihan (CHN)	21	12	21
