= 2013 BWF World Championships – Women's singles =

Badminton championships

Women's singles at the 2013 BWF World Championships
- Venue: Tianhe Sports Center
- Location: Guangzhou, China
- Dates: August 5, 2013 – August 11, 2013

Medalists
gold medal	Ratchanok Intanon	Thailand
silver medal	Li Xuerui	China
bronze medal	Bae Yeon-ju	South Korea
bronze medal	P. V. Sindhu	India

The women's singles tournament of the 2013 BWF World Championships (World Badminton Championships) was held from August 5 to 11. Wang Yihan was the defending champion. Ratchanok Inthanon defeated Li Xuerui 22–20, 18–21, 21–14 in the final.

== Seeds ==
1. (China) Li Xuerui (final)
2. (China) Wang Yihan (third round)
3. (India) Saina Nehwal (quarterfinals)
4. (Thailand) Ratchanok Intanon (champion)
5. (South Korea) Sung Ji-hyun (third round)
6. (Chinese Taipei) Tai Tzu-ying (quarterfinals)
7. (China) Wang Shixian (quarterfinals)
8. (Japan) Minatsu Mitani (second round)

9. (Indonesia) Lindaweni Fanetri (third round)
10. (India) P. V. Sindhu (semifinals)
11. (Japan) Eriko Hirose (third round)
12. (Thailand) Sapsiree Taerattanachai (second round)
13. (South Korea) Bae Yeon-ju (semifinals)
14. (Thailand) Busanan Ongbumrungpan (second round)
15. (Thailand) Porntip Buranaprasertsuk (third round)
16. (Hong Kong) Yip Pui Yin (third round)

Click on the seed number of a player to go to their draw section.

== Draw ==
=== Finals ===
Quarterfinals
1	(China) Li Xuerui	27	21
6	(Chinese Taipei) Tai Tzu-ying	25	13
13	(South Korea) Bae Yeon-ju	23	21
3	(India) Saina Nehwal	21	9
4	(Thailand) Ratchanok Inthanon	21	20	21
(Spain) Carolina Marín	18	22	15
7	(China) Wang Shixian	18	17
10	(India) P. V. Sindhu	21	21

Semifinals
1	(China) Li Xuerui	21	21
13	(South Korea) Bae Yeon-ju	5	11
4	(Thailand) Ratchanok Inthanon	21	21
10	(India) P. V. Sindhu	10	13

Final
1	(China) Li Xuerui	20	21	14
4	(Thailand) Ratchanok Inthanon	22	18	21

=== Section 1 ===
First Round
(Ukraine) Marija Ulitina
(China) Jiang Yanjiao	w/o
(Czech Republic) Kristina Gavnholt	21	15	17
(Spain) Beatriz Corrales	18	21	21
(Canada) Michelle Li	18	14
(Bulgaria) Linda Zetchiri	21	21
(Scotland) Kirsty Gilmour
(Switzerland) Nicole Schaller	w/o

Second Round
1	(China) Li Xuerui	21	21
(Ukraine) Marija Ulitina	9	10
(Spain) Beatriz Corrales	12	11
9	(Indonesia) Lindaweni Fanetri	21	21
12	(Thailand) Sapsiree Taerattanachai	16	17
(Bulgaria) Linda Zetchiri	21	21
(Scotland) Kirsty Gilmour	12	22	6
6	(Chinese Taipei) Tai Tzu-ying	21	20	21

Third Round
1	(China) Li Xuerui	21	21
9	(Indonesia) Lindaweni Fanetri	10	12
(Bulgaria) Linda Zetchiri	13	16
6	(Chinese Taipei) Tai Tzu-ying	21	21

Quarterfinals
1	(China) Li Xuerui	27	21
6	(Chinese Taipei) Tai Tzu-ying	25	13

=== Section 2 ===
First Round
(Malaysia) Tee Jing Yi	17	17
(Japan) Sayaka Takahashi	21	21
(Hong Kong) Chan Tsz Ka	18	21	21
(Denmark) Line Kjaersfeldt	21	8	9
(Singapore) Xing Aiying	w/o
(United States) Jamie Subandhi
(Russia) Olga Golovanova	21	21
(Belarus) Alesia Zaitsava	13	14

Second Round
8	(Japan) Minatsu Mitani	16	9
(Japan) Sayaka Takahashi	21	21
(Hong Kong) Chan Tsz Ka	10	22	9
13	(South Korea) Bae Yeon-ju	21	20	21
15	(Thailand) Porntip Buranaprasertsuk	21	21
(United States) Jamie Subandhi	12	9
(Russia) Olga Golovanova	5	4
3	(India) Saina Nehwal	21	21

Third Round
(Japan) Sayaka Takahashi	19	17
13	(South Korea) Bae Yeon-ju	21	21
15	(Thailand) Porntip Buranaprasertsuk	21	16	14
3	(India) Saina Nehwal	18	21	21

Quarterfinals
13	(South Korea) Bae Yeon-ju	23	21
3	(India) Saina Nehwal	21	9

=== Section 3 ===
First Round
(Lithuania) Akvile Stapusaityte	4	12
(Singapore) Gu Juan	21	21
(Germany) Olga Konon	w/o
(Switzerland) Sabrina Jaquet
(Indonesia) Adriyanti Firdasari	15	11
(Spain) Carolina Marín	21	21
(England) Sarah Walker	21	21
(Mauritius) Kate Foo Kune	11	17

Second Round
4	(Thailand) Ratchanok Inthanon	16	21	21
(Singapore) Gu Juan	21	17	9
(Switzerland) Sabrina Jaquet	15	15
16	(Hong Kong) Yip Pui Yin	21	21
14	(Thailand) Busanan Ongbumrungpan	12	21	14
(Spain) Carolina Marín	21	17	21
(England) Sarah Walker	8	11
5	(South Korea) Sung Ji-hyun	21	21

Third Round
4	(Thailand) Ratchanok Inthanon	21	21
16	(Hong Kong) Yip Pui Yin	14	12
(Spain) Carolina Marín	13	21	22
5	(South Korea) Sung Ji-hyun	21	13	20

Quarterfinals
4	(Thailand) Ratchanok Inthanon	21	20	21
(Spain) Carolina Marín	18	22	15

=== Section 4 ===
First Round
(Republic of Ireland) Chloe Magee	14	14
(Chinese Taipei) Pai Hsiao-ma	21	21
(Bulgaria) Petya Nedelcheva	21	21
(Russia) Natalia Perminova	14	18
(Japan) Kaori Imabeppu	21	21
(Indonesia) Aprilla Yuswandari	18	10
(Indonesia) Bellaetrix Manuputty	21	21
(Denmark) Sandra-Maria Jensen	6	19

Second Round
7	(China) Wang Shixian	21	21	21
(Chinese Taipei) Pai Hsiao-ma	17	23	11
(Bulgaria) Petya Nedelcheva	21	16	18
11	(Japan) Eriko Hirose	11	21	21
10	(India) P. V. Sindhu	21	19	21
(Japan) Kaori Imabeppu	19	21	17
(Indonesia) Bellaetrix Manuputty	12	8
2	(China) Wang Yihan	21	21

Third Round
7	(China) Wang Shixian	21	21
11	(Japan) Eriko Hirose	8	13
10	(India) P. V. Sindhu	21	23
2	(China) Wang Yihan	18	21

Quarterfinals
7	(China) Wang Shixian	18	17
10	(India) P. V. Sindhu	21	21
