= Tai Tzu-ying =

Taiwanese badminton player (born 1994)

Tai Tzu-ying 戴資穎
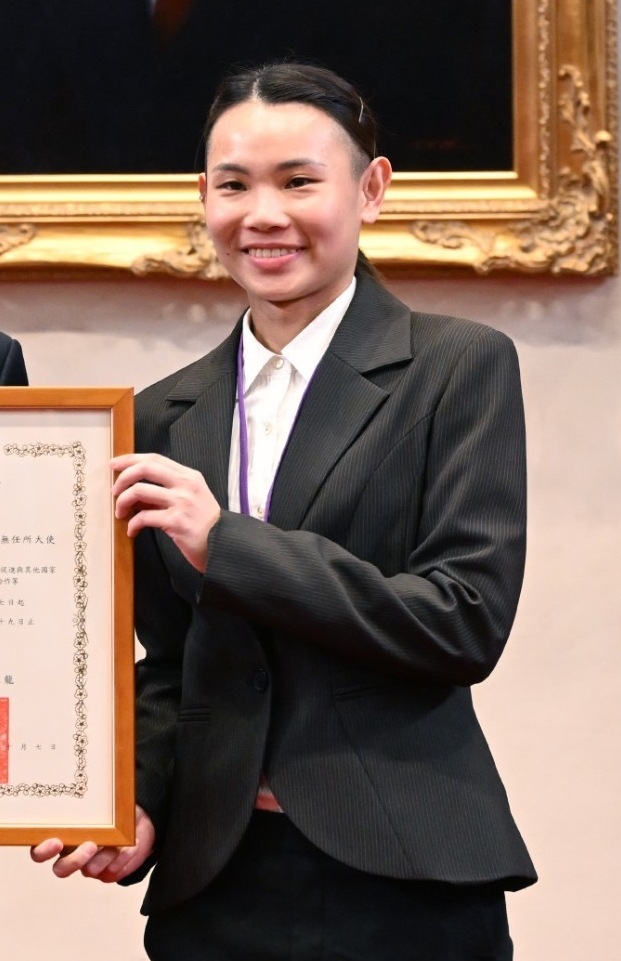
- Tai in 2024

Personal information
- Born: 20 June 1994 (age 32) Kaohsiung, Taiwan
- Years active: 2009–2025
- Height: 1.63 m (5 ft 4 in)
- Weight: 57 kg (126 lb)

Sport
- Country: Taiwan
- Sport: Badminton
- Handedness: Right
- Coached by: Lai Chien-cheng (賴建誠)
- Retired: 7 November 2025

Women's singles
- Career record: 532 wins, 190 losses
- Highest ranking: 1 (1 December 2016)
- BWF profile
Medal record
Women's badminton
Representing Chinese Taipei
Olympic Games
Silver medal – second place	2020 Tokyo	Women's singles
World Championships
Silver medal – second place	2021 Huelva	Women's singles
Bronze medal – third place	2022 Tokyo	Women's singles
Asian Games
Gold medal – first place	2018 Jakarta–Palembang	Women's singles
Bronze medal – third place	2014 Incheon	Women's singles
Asian Championships
Gold medal – first place	2017 Wuhan	Women's singles
Gold medal – first place	2018 Wuhan	Women's singles
Gold medal – first place	2023 Dubai	Women's singles
Bronze medal – third place	2015 Wuhan	Women's singles
East Asian Games
Silver medal – second place	2009 Hong Kong	Women's team
Silver medal – second place	2013 Tianjin	Women's team
Bronze medal – third place	2009 Hong Kong	Women's singles
Summer Universiade
Gold medal – first place	2017 Taipei	Women's singles
Gold medal – first place	2017 Taipei	Mixed team
Silver medal – second place	2013 Kazan	Women's singles
Bronze medal – third place	2013 Kazan	Mixed team
Bronze medal – third place	2015 Gwangju	Women's singles
Asian Junior Championships
Silver medal – second place	2009 Kuala Lumpur	Girls' singles

Tai Tzu-ying

Taiwanese Ambassador-at-large
- Incumbent
- Assumed office 7 October 2024
- President: Lai Ching-te

Tai Tzu-ying (Chinese: 戴資穎; pinyin: Dài Zīyǐng; Wade–Giles: Tai Tzu-ying; born 20 June 1994) is a Taiwanese retired professional badminton player. At the age of 22, she achieved world no.1 ranking in December 2016, and held that position for 214 weeks in different spells, the longest in the BWF women's singles history. (Note: See also: Number one ranked players timeline.) Tai was the women's singles silver medalist in the Tokyo 2020 Olympics and the 2021 BWF World Championships. She was gold medalist in the 2017 Summer Universiade and the 2018 Asian Games. She was the champion of BWF Super Series Finals/BWF World Tour Finals a record four times (2014, 2016, 2020, 2023). She was thrice the champion of the All England Open (2017, 2018, 2020), and of the Asian Championships (2017, 2018, 2023).

== Career ==
Tai's career began when she was in elementary school, as she was influenced by her father who was a firefighter and the director of Kaohsiung city's badminton committee. Tai started playing badminton in the fourth or fifth grade of elementary school, and in the sixth grade, she played at the National ranking tournament, won the title in the second division, and earned the right to participate in the first division games. She was the youngest player to compete in the first division.

=== 2007–2010: Early international career ===
Tai made her debut in an international tournament in 2007 at the Vietnam International. In 2009, she won the silver medal at the Asian Junior Championships, losing the final match to Chen Xiaojia in straight games. She represented Kaohsiung City in the National Games and went on to the quarter-finals. Young Tai began to show her potential when she was 15 years old, as she was able to compete at the senior level and become runner-up at the Vietnam Open, a Grand Prix tournament. In December, Tai competed at the East Asian Games for Chinese Taipei, won a bronze medal in the women's singles, and helped the team reach the final, settling for a silver medal.

In 2010, she entered the big stage by competing in the Superseries event in Korea Open. In April, she participated at the World Junior Championships in Mexico but had to retire in the quarter-finals due to injury. In June, she experienced the most memorable thing during her career as a badminton player when she reached her first Superseries final on her birthday in Singapore Open. She started in the qualifying draw and went on to reach the final, which she lost to Saina Nehwal in straight games.

=== 2011–2013: First Grand Prix and Superseries title ===
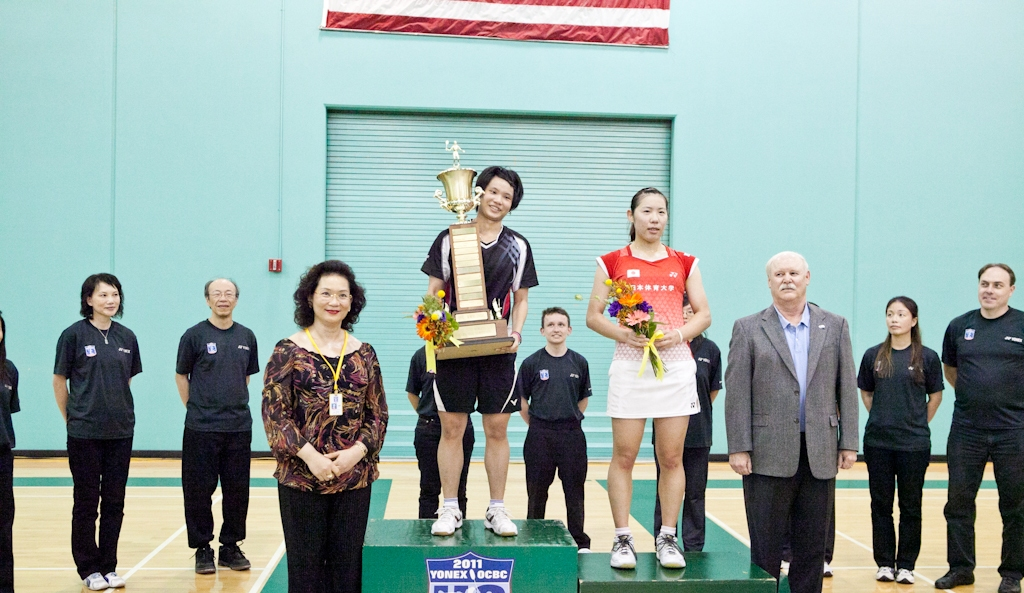
Tai won the 2011 U.S. Open

In 2011, Tai made good progress by defeating the top-ranked player. She defeated Zhu Lin in the first round of the Australian Open, Wang Xin in the first round of Indonesia Open, and in July, she beat the former world champion Lu Lan in the quarter-finals of the U.S. Open, which was a Grand Prix Gold tournament, and beat World Junior silver medalist Sayaka Sato in the final. This was the first international title she would win, at the age of only 17. She also reached the semi-finals of the Canada, Vietnam, and French Open, where, in France, she defeated China's number 1, Wang Shixian, in the quarter-finals. Tai was awarded best rookie athlete in the 2011 Sports Elite Awards.

In the early half of the 2012 season, her best achievements were the reaching the semi-finals in the All England Open and being ranked as 16th in the world. Tai represented her country as the second women's singles behind Cheng Shao-chieh at the 2012 Summer Olympics in London. The 18-year-old, ranked 13th in the world and seeded 10th won all matches in the group stage defeating Anu Nieminen of Finland and Victoria Montero of Mexico. Her run at the Olympics was stopped by the eventual gold medalist from China Li Xuerui in the round of 16. In September, she claimed her first ever Superseries title in the Japan Open and made history as the youngest player to win a Superseries title (currently the third youngest player, after Ratchanok Intanon, who won the India Open in 2013, and Akane Yamaguchi, who won the Japan Open in 2013). She truly entered the upper echelons and future of the women's game with her victory in Japan and increasingly impressive performances and significant wins over some of the top players. In October, she won the Chinese Taipei Open against Lindaweni Fanetri in a close rubber games 21–19, 20–22, 22–20. In November, she competed as the top-seeded player at the World Junior Championships in Chiba, Japan, but fell in the quarter-finals to Sun Yu. She took part in the World University Championships and won a gold in the women's singles and a silver medal in the women's doubles with her partner Pai Hsiao-ma.

Tai clinched her maiden and only title in 2013 in the Malaysia Open. In other tournaments in the first half of the 2013 season, she often experienced defeat in the quarter-finals, such as in the Germany, Switzerland, Asian Championships, Indonesia, Singapore, as well with her teammate in the Sudirman Cup. Tai then competed in the Summer Universiade and won the silver in the women's singles and bronze in the team event. Her quarter-finals defeat continued into the World Championship. She finally advanced to the final stage in the Chinese Taipei Open but was defeated by Sung Ji-hyun. She next played in the East Asian Games in Tianjin, and won a silver medal in the women's team event. Tai qualified for the Superseries Finals. She defeated Sung Ji-hyun and Porntip Buranaprasertsuk but lost to Wang Shixian in the group stage. She made it to the semi-finals and successfully avenged her loss, beating Wang Shixian. She ended second after losing the final to Li Xuerui.

=== 2014–2015: Asian bronze and Superseries Finals title ===
Tai represented her country at the 2014 Asian Games and won Taiwan's first badminton medal by finishing in third place. She reached her first finals in the Superseries event in the Japan Open but was still unable to defeat the world's number one, Li Xuerui. She then won the Hong Kong Open after beating Nozomi Okuhara in straight games. She extended her winning streak to the Superseries Finals in Dubai and won the first title for Taiwan in the Superseries finals by beating Korea's Sung Ji-hyun in straight games.

In 2015, she was beaten by Sun Yu in the Singapore Open. She did not win any titles that year.

=== 2016: World #1 ===
In 2016, Tai won the Indonesia Open and the Hong Kong Open to reach World No. 1 for the first time in her career. She won the Superseries Finals in Dubai for the second time, becoming the second women's singles player to do so (after Li Xuerui in 2012 and 2013). (Note: See also: List of Superseries Finals winner.) She also made history by becoming the first women's singles player to reach the finals in the Superseries Finals three times. She received the most prize money throughout 2016 with US$271,025.

=== 2017: Asian champion and fifth straight Superseries title ===
Before the 2017 season started, Tai announced that she would skip that year's World Championships in Glasgow. Tai decided to attend the 2017 Summer Universiade not only out of a desire to earn a title for her home country but also for the bigger picture. Since the Summer Universiade was by far the biggest sporting event held in her home country, only second to the Olympic Games, Tai wanted to welcome the world to see Taiwan. President Tsai commended Tai's decision. She won the Special Contribution Award at the 2017 Sports Elite Awards.

Tai won her first All England Open title in March 2017, beating Ratchanok Intanon in the finals. In April, Tai won the Malaysia Open as well as the Singapore Open beating Carolina Marín in the finals two times in two weeks. Her titles in Malaysia and Singapore were her fourth and fifth consecutive ones. Later in April, she won another title against Akane Yamaguchi in the Asian Championships held in Wuhan, China, marking a sixth consecutive title. It was also the first gold medal for Taiwan in this competition.

After winning 3 matches for her country in the 2017 Sudirman Cup, Tai extended her winning streak to 27 matches, before losing to Thailand's Nitchaon Jindapol in the quarter-finals of the Indonesia Open. In the Universiade, Tai claimed two gold medals by winning the women's singles and team events. She returned to the top of the podium of the Superseries tournament after winning the French Open in October, then defending and securing her third Hong Kong Open title in November.

=== 2018–2019: Asian Games gold, second All England and Asian Champions ===
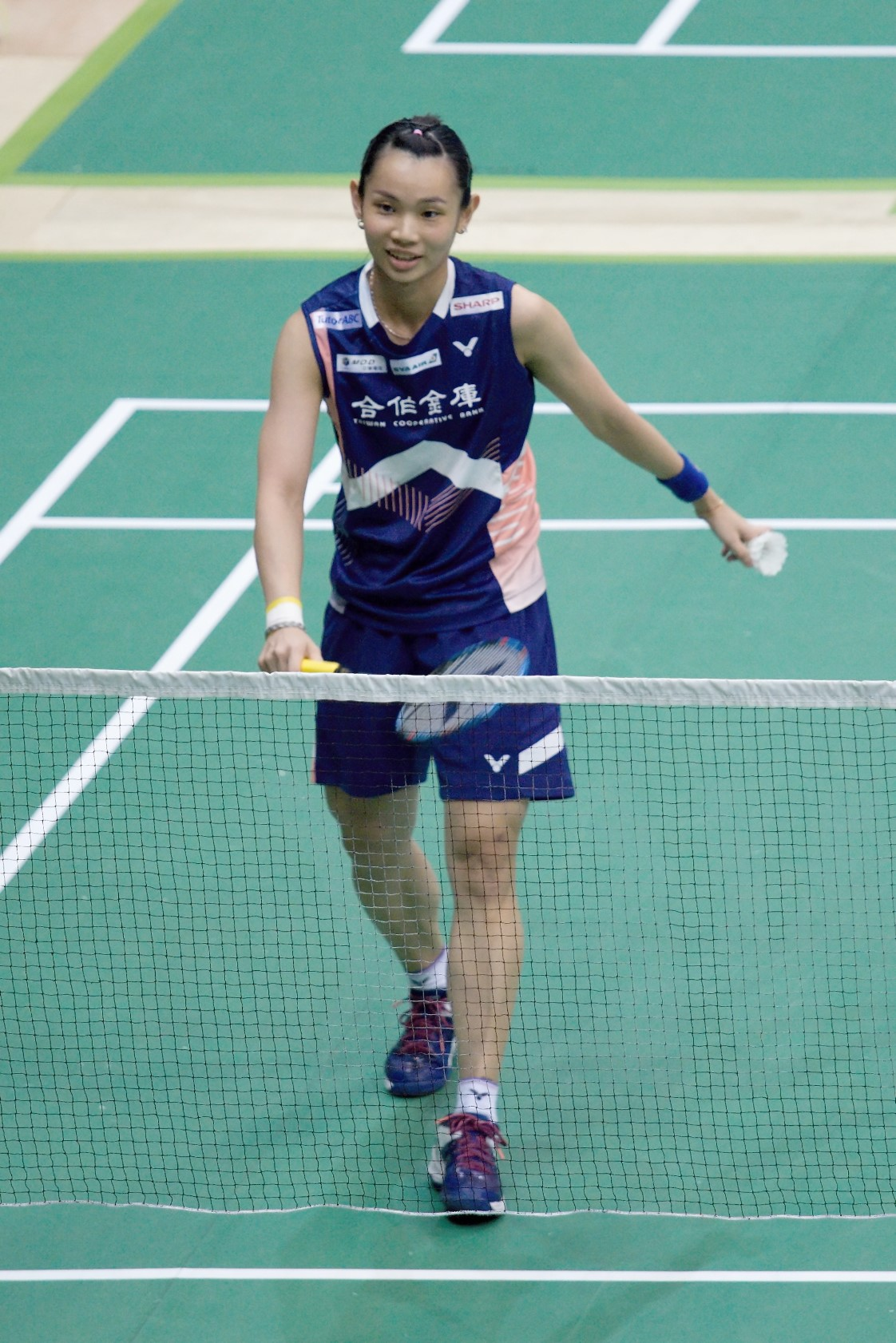
Tai at the Yonex Chinese Taipei Open 2018

In 2018, Tai started the season by participating in the Malaysian Master, in which she defeated Chen Yufei in the quarter-finals and Carolina Marín in a thrilling semi-finals, coming from a game down, but lost to Ratchanok Intanon in the final. A week later, at the Indonesia Masters, she won the title after defeating Saina Nehwal. But in her next tournament, the Asian Championships, she won the title after defeating Chen Yufei in the final in Wuhan and regained her world number 1 ranking.

In the 2018 BWF World Championships's third round, she defeated Beiwen Zhang in straight games and broke the record of the longest winning streak with 31 consecutive matches won (Indonesia Masters, All England Open as a defending champion, Asian Championships, Uber Cup, Malaysia Open, Indonesia Open, and BWF World Championships), while the former record of 30 wins was held by Li Xuerui. However, her winning streak was stopped by He Bingjiao in the quarter-finals of the World Championships.

In the 2018 Asian Games, held in Jakarta, Tai won the gold medal by beating P. V. Sindhu in straight games in the final, which became the first big title in her career. She then secured the home soil title, winning the Chinese Taipei Open in October. After crowning the women's singles' title of 2018 Denmark Open, her ranking points reached 101,517. She became the second player in the women's singles category to break 100,000 points, while the first was Li Xuerui, who led with 101,644 points. Although she lost the final game of the 2018 French Open, she still won 9,350 points. Deleting her 2017 French Open 9,200 points, her points eventually came to 101,667, and she became the highest points holder in women's singles category history. Tai qualified to compete at the World Tour Finals and was placed as the top seed. In the group stage, she was placed in group A along with Akane Yamaguchi, P. V. Sindhu, and Beiwen Zhang. In her first match, she defeated Zhang. She lost to Sindhu. However, she retired with an injury in her third group stage match against Yamaguchi after losing the first game 17–21 and trailing 12–11 in the second game. Tai did not reveal the nature of the injury or how it occurred. For her achievements in 2018, she was nominated as BWF Female Player of the Year.

In 2019, she reached the quarter-final stage of the Malaysia Masters, losing to the same opponent of the previous year and her arch-rival Ratchanok Intanon in straight games. In March, she advanced to the finals of the All England Open for the third straight time. However, she unexpectedly lost to the Chinese Chen Yufei, after 11 straight victories over her. She came back and claimed back-to-back titles at the Malaysia Open and Singapore Open, beating the Japanese Akane Yamaguchi and Nozomi Okuhara respectively in the finals in straight games. In July, she was unable to defend her title at the Indonesia Open after losing in the semi-finals to Akane Yamaguchi. Her jinx at the World Championships continued further after she lost to P. V. Sindhu of India in the quarter-finals in 3 games. This was her 5th straight quarter-finals loss at the World Championships.

Tai reached the finals of the China Open, where she lost to insurgent Carolina Marín in three games. She reached the semi-finals of the Korea Open. She aimed for her third title of the year at the Denmark Open and reached the finals again after three years. Despite a good performance, she could not stand right against Chen Yufei and lost the finals.

=== 2020–2021: Third All England title and BWF Female Player of the Year ===
Tai commenced the year by competing at the Malaysia Masters as the first seed. She finished as runner-up after losing to Chen Yufei in straight games. In her fourth straight All England Open finals that year, she won the coveted title for the third time, thereby becoming only the second female player after Ye Zhaoying (1996–99) to clinch three titles by contesting 4 consecutive finals in this tournament. In the final, she beat Chen Yufei with the score of 21–19, 21–15, and with this, she avenged her defeat to Chen at this stage the prior year. She had to settle for second best at the two consecutive Thailand Open Super 1000 events in January 2021, after losing to Carolina Marín in both occasions in straight games. She finally defeated Marín at the BWF World Tour Finals while contesting her 5th end-of-season championships finals and winning for the third time. She claimed victory over her opponent in three games. Tai was named the BWF Female Player of the Year 2020–2021.

Tai Tzu-ying won the All England 2020 and then struck a rich vein of form at the three-tournament Asian Leg in January 2021, making all three finals and clinching the BWF World Tour Finals 2020. Tai then made the finals of the Tokyo Olympics and won a silver medal after being defeated by the top seed Chen Yufei in an intense match, 18–21, 21–19, 18–21.

=== 2022: World Championship bronze, 3rd Indonesia Open, and 4th Taipei Open title ===
In May's Thailand Open, Tai advanced to the finals against Chen Yufei, repeating the 2020 Tokyo Olympic women's singles match-up. In the end, she defeated Chen to avenge her loss at the 2020 Olympics. She met Chen again in the semi-finals of the Indonesia Open. Tai's superb coordination won her in the decider. In the finals, she defeated another Chinese player, Wang Zhiyi, and she successfully claimed her third Indonesia Open title. She won her fourth Taipei Open title with a straight game win over Saena Kawakami in the finals.

In August, at the BWF World Championships that were held in Tokyo, Japan, Tai defeated Slovak and Vietnamese players and advanced to the quarter-finals, where she defeated Busanan Ongbamrungphan. However, in the semi-finals, she met Chen again, but due to many mistakes in the last game, she lost and claimed the bronze medal. Tai qualified to compete at the World Tour Finals that were held in Bangkok, Thailand. She advanced to the semi-finals with a record of 2 wins and 1 loss in the group stage and then met He Bingjiao in the semi-finals and avenged her defeat in the group stage. In the finals, she lost to Akane Yamaguchi, who was in great form at the time and had won the World Championships for two consecutive years, and finished second.

=== 2025: Retirement ===
Tai announced her retirement on 7 November 2025. Due to previous injuries leading to her desire to not let people see her in a vulnerable state, she used social media to make her retirement announcement, adding in English, "I hope the spirit of TTY stays with you always".

== Playing style ==
Tai plays an offensive game, with many calling her style unpredictable and often spontaneous. She is a very adventurous player with a disguised nature of shots, seemingly able to hit the shuttle with a wide range of shots and angles. She has a strong backhand and good net-play, while her biggest fault is being inconsistent at times. Tai also has strong stamina and is very athletic. Tai herself said that she does not follow a certain play or style, and focuses on herself rather than her opponent or any strategies. Tai has clocked fast smashes, with one of the fastest recorded being 360 km/h at the 2016 All England Open quarter-finals, despite her preference of playing slowly to set up shots.

Tai has been noted for her exceptional talent and deceptive shot-making. Gillian Clark, a commentator for Badminton World Federation, has highlighted her shot-making ability and described her as one of the most entertaining players to watch in women’s singles.

== Achievements ==
=== Olympic Games ===
Women's singles
Year	Venue	Opponent	Score	Result	Ref.
2020	Musashino Forest Sport Plaza, Tokyo, Japan	(China) Chen Yufei	18–21, 21–19, 18–21	Silver	

=== BWF World Championships ===
Women's singles
Year	Venue	Opponent	Score	Result	Ref.
2021	Palacio de los Deportes Carolina Marín, Huelva, Spain	(Japan) Akane Yamaguchi	14–21, 11–21	Silver	
2022	Tokyo Metropolitan Gymnasium, Tokyo, Japan	(China) Chen Yufei	21–15, 14–21, 18–21	Bronze	

=== Asian Games ===
Women's singles
Year	Venue	Opponent	Score	Result	Ref.
2014	Gyeyang Gymnasium, Incheon, South Korea	(China) Li Xuerui	16–21, 26–24, 8–21	Bronze	
2018	Istora Gelora Bung Karno, Jakarta, Indonesia	(India) P. V. Sindhu	21–13, 21–16	Gold	

=== Asian Championships ===
Women's singles
Year	Venue	Opponent	Score	Result	Ref.
2015	Wuhan Sports Center Gymnasium, Wuhan, China	(Thailand) Ratchanok Intanon	22–20, 9–21, 12–21	Bronze	
2017	Wuhan Sports Center Gymnasium, Wuhan, China	(Japan) Akane Yamaguchi	18–21, 21–11, 21–18	Gold	
2018	Wuhan Sports Center Gymnasium, Wuhan, China	(China) Chen Yufei	21–19, 22–20	Gold	
2023	Sheikh Rashid Bin Hamdan Indoor Hall, Dubai, United Arab Emirates	(South Korea) An Se-young	21–10, 21–14	Gold	

=== East Asian Games ===
Women's singles
Year	Venue	Opponent	Score	Result	Ref.
2009	Queen Elizabeth Stadium, Hong Kong	(Hong Kong) Yip Pui Yin	17–21, 21–17, 19–21	Bronze	

=== Summer Universiade ===
Women's singles
Year	Venue	Opponent	Score	Result	Ref.
2013	Tennis Academy, Kazan, Russia	(South Korea) Sung Ji-hyun	16–21, 27–29	Silver	
2015	Hwasun Hanium Culture Sports Center, Hwasun, South Korea	(Thailand) Porntip Buranaprasertsuk	12–21, 14–21	Bronze	
2017	Taipei Gymnasium, Taipei, Taiwan	(South Korea) Lee Jang-mi	21–9, 21–13	Gold	

=== World University Championships ===
Women's singles
Year	Venue	Opponent	Score	Result	Ref.
2012	Yeomju Gymnasium, Gwangju, South Korea	(Chinese Taipei) Pai Hsiao-ma	21–13 retired	Gold	

Women's doubles
Year	Venue	Partner	Opponent	Score	Result	Ref.
2012	Yeomju Gymnasium; Gwangju, South Korea	(Chinese Taipei) Pai Hsiao-ma	(Japan) Miri Ichimaru (Japan) Shiho Tanaka	20–22, 11–21	Silver	

=== Asian Junior Championships ===
Girls' singles
Year	Venue	Opponent	Score	Result	Ref.
2009	Stadium Juara, Kuala Lumpur, Malaysia	(China) Chen Xiaojia	13–21, 13–21	Silver	

=== BWF World Tour (17 titles, 12 runners-up) ===
The BWF World Tour, which was announced on 19 March 2017 and implemented in 2018, is a series of elite badminton tournaments sanctioned by the Badminton World Federation (BWF). The BWF World Tour is divided into levels of World Tour Finals, Super 1000, Super 750, Super 500, Super 300, and the BWF Tour Super 100.

Women's singles
Year	Tournament	Level	Opponent	Score	Result	Ref.
2018	Malaysia Masters	Super 500	(Thailand) Ratchanok Intanon	16–21, 21–14, 22–24	(silver) Runner-up	
2018	Indonesia Masters	Super 500	(India) Saina Nehwal	21–9, 21–13	(gold) Winner	
2018	All England Open	Super 1000	(Japan) Akane Yamaguchi	22–20, 21–13	(gold) Winner	
2018	Malaysia Open	Super 750	(China) He Bingjiao	22–20, 21–11	(gold) Winner	
2018	Indonesia Open	Super 1000	(China) Chen Yufei	21–23, 21–15, 21–9	(gold) Winner	
2018	Chinese Taipei Open	Super 300	(Denmark) Line Kjærsfeldt	17–21, 21–10, 21–13	(gold) Winner	
2018	Denmark Open	Super 750	(India) Saina Nehwal	21–13, 13–21, 21–6	(gold) Winner	
2018	French Open	Super 750	(Japan) Akane Yamaguchi	20–22, 21–17, 13–21	(silver) Runner-up	
2019	All England Open	Super 1000	(China) Chen Yufei	17–21, 17–21	(silver) Runner-up	
2019	Malaysia Open	Super 750	(Japan) Akane Yamaguchi	21–16, 21–19	(gold) Winner	
2019	Singapore Open	Super 500	(Japan) Nozomi Okuhara	21–19, 21–15	(gold) Winner	
2019	China Open	Super 1000	(Spain) Carolina Marín	21–14, 17–21, 18–21	(silver) Runner-up	
2019	Denmark Open	Super 750	(Japan) Nozomi Okuhara	21–17, 21–14	(gold) Winner	
2019	BWF World Tour Finals	World Tour Finals	(China) Chen Yufei	21–12, 12–21, 17–21	(silver) Runner-up	
2020	Malaysia Masters	Super 500	(China) Chen Yufei	17–21, 10–21	(silver) Runner-up	
2020	All England Open	Super 1000	(China) Chen Yufei	21–19, 21–15	(gold) Winner	
2020 (I)	Thailand Open	Super 1000	(Spain) Carolina Marín	9–21, 16–21	(silver) Runner-up	
2020 (II)	Thailand Open	Super 1000	(Spain) Carolina Marín	19–21, 17–21	(silver) Runner-up	
2020	BWF World Tour Finals	World Tour Finals	(Spain) Carolina Marín	14–21, 21–8, 21–19	(gold) Winner	
2022	Thailand Open	Super 500	(China) Chen Yufei	21–15, 17–21, 21–12	(gold) Winner	
2022	Indonesia Open	Super 1000	(China) Wang Zhiyi	21–23, 21–6, 21–15	(gold) Winner	
2022	Taipei Open	Super 300	(Japan) Saena Kawakami	21–17, 21–16	(gold) Winner	
2022	BWF World Tour Finals	World Tour Finals	(Japan) Akane Yamaguchi	18–21, 20–22	(silver) Runner-up	
2023	Taipei Open	Super 300	(United States) Beiwen Zhang	21–14, 21–17	(gold) Winner	
2023	Korea Open	Super 500	(South Korea) An Se-young	9–21, 15–21	(silver) Runner-up	
2023	French Open	Super 750	(China) Chen Yufei	17–21, 20–22	(silver) Runner-up	
2023	BWF World Tour Finals	World Tour Finals	(Spain) Carolina Marín	12–21, 21–14, 21–18	(gold) Winner	
2024	Malaysia Open	Super 1000	(South Korea) An Se-young	21–10, 10–21, 18–21	(silver) Runner-up	
2024	India Open	Super 750	(China) Chen Yufei	21–16, 21–12	(gold) Winner	

=== BWF Superseries (12 titles, 6 runners-up) ===
The BWF Superseries, which was launched on 14 December 2006 and implemented in 2007, was a series of elite badminton tournaments, sanctioned by the Badminton World Federation (BWF). BWF Superseries levels were Superseries and Superseries Premier. A season of Superseries consisted of twelve tournaments around the world that had been introduced since 2011. Successful players were invited to the Superseries Finals, which were held at the end of each year.

Women's singles
Year	Tournament	Opponent	Score	Result	Ref.
2010	Singapore Open	(India) Saina Nehwal	18–21, 15–21	(silver) Runner-up	
2012	Japan Open	(Japan) Eriko Hirose	9–21, 21–9, 21–14	(gold) Winner	
2013	Malaysia Open	(China) Yao Xue	21–17, 21–14	(gold) Winner	
2013	World Superseries Finals	(China) Li Xuerui	8–21, 14–21	(silver) Runner-up	
2014	Japan Open	(China) Li Xuerui	16–21, 6–21	(silver) Runner-up	
2014	Hong Kong Open	(Japan) Nozomi Okuhara	21–19, 21–11	(gold) Winner	
2014	Dubai World Superseries Finals	(South Korea) Sung Ji-hyun	21–17, 21–12	(gold) Winner	
2015	Singapore Open	(China) Sun Yu	13–21, 21–19, 20–22	(silver) Runner-up	
2016	Malaysia Open	(Thailand) Ratchanok Intanon	14–21, 15–21	(silver) Runner-up	
2016	Indonesia Open	(China) Wang Yihan	21–17, 21–8	(gold) Winner	
2016	Denmark Open	(Japan) Akane Yamaguchi	21–19, 14–21, 12–21	(silver) Runner-up	
2016	Hong Kong Open	(India) P. V. Sindhu	21–15, 21–17	(gold) Winner	
2016	Dubai World Superseries Finals	(South Korea) Sung Ji-hyun	21–14, 21–13	(gold) Winner	
2017	All England Open	(Thailand) Ratchanok Intanon	21–16, 22–20	(gold) Winner	
2017	Malaysia Open	(Spain) Carolina Marín	23–25, 22–20, 21–13	(gold) Winner	
2017	Singapore Open	(Spain) Carolina Marín	21–15, 21–15	(gold) Winner	
2017	French Open	(Japan) Akane Yamaguchi	21–4, 21–16	(gold) Winner	
2017	Hong Kong Open	(India) P. V. Sindhu	21–18, 21–18	(gold) Winner	

BWF Super Series Finals tournament
BWF Super Series Premier tournament
BWF Super Series tournament

=== BWF Grand Prix (3 titles, 2 runners-up) ===
The BWF Grand Prix had two levels, the Grand Prix and Grand Prix Gold. It was a series of badminton tournaments sanctioned by the Badminton World Federation (BWF) and played between 2007 and 2017.

Women's singles
Year	Tournament	Opponent	Score	Result	Ref.
2009	Vietnam Open	(Indonesia) Fransisca Ratnasari	19–21, 21–15, 13–21	(silver) Runner-up	
2011	U.S. Open	(Japan) Sayaka Sato	21–16, 19–21, 21–6	(gold) Winner	
2012	Chinese Taipei Open	(Indonesia) Lindaweni Fanetri	21–19, 20–22, 22–20	(gold) Winner	
2013	Chinese Taipei Open	(South Korea) Sung Ji-hyun	16–21, 9–21	(silver) Runner-up	
2016	Chinese Taipei Open	(China) Wang Shixian	23–21, 21–6	(gold) Winner	

BWF Grand Prix Gold tournament
BWF Grand Prix tournament

=== Invitation tournament ===
Mixed doubles
Year	Tournament	Partner	Opponent	Score	Result	Ref.
2017	Jeunesse Cup International All Star	(Chinese Taipei) Wang Tzu-wei	(Denmark) Mads Conrad-Petersen (Denmark) Line Kjærsfeldt	18–21, 20–22	(silver) Runner-up	

== Performance timeline ==
Key

W	Won	F	Finalist	SF	Semi-finalist
QF	Quarter-finalist	#R	Rounds 4, 3, 2, 1	RR	Round-robin stage
Q#	Qualification round	A	Absent	w/d	Withdrew
G	Gold	S	Silver	B	Bronze
NH	Not held	N/A	Not applicable	DNQ	Did not qualify

=== Women's singles ===
Tournament	2007	2008	2009	2010	2011	2012	2013	2014	2015	2016	2017	2018	2019	2020	2021	2022	2023	2024	SR	W–L	Win %	Ref
National representation – Individual
Olympic Games	NH	DNQ	NH			R16; 2–1	NH			R16; 2–1	NH			S 5–1	NH			RR; 1–1	0 / 4	10–4	71.43%	
World Championships	DNQ	NH	DNQ		w/d 0–0	NH	QF; 2–1	QF; 2–1	QF; 2–1	NH	A	QF; 2–1	QF; 2–1	NH	S 4–1	SF-B; 3–1	QF; 2–1	NH	0 / 8	19–8	70.37%	
Asian Games	NH			A	NH			SF-B; 3–1	NH			G 4–0	NH			3R; 1–1	NH		1 / 3	8–2	80.00%	
Asia Championships	absent				2R; 1–1	2R; 1–1	QF; 2–1	QF; 2–1	SF-B; 3–1	QF; 2–1	G 5–0	G 5–0	A	NH		A	G 5–0	2R; 1–1	3 / 10	27–7	79.41%	
East Asian Games^{1}	NH		SF-B; 2–1	NH			1R; 0–0	NH											0 / 0	0–0	–	
World Junior Championships	absent			4R ^{1} 2–1	A	QF; 3–1	Not Applicable												0 / 1	3–1	75.00%	
National representation – Team
Uber Cup	NH	DNQ	NH	DNQ	NH	QF; 2–1	NH	RR; 1–1	NH	QF; 3–0	NH	QF; 4–0	NH	A	NH	QF; 2–1	NH	QF; 1–0	0 / 6	13–3	81.25%	
Sudirman Cup	A	NH	A	N/A	QF; 0–2	NH	QF; 2–0	NH	QF; 3–0	NH	QF; 3–0	NH	QF; 2–1	NH	A	NH	QF; 2–1	NH	0 / 6	12–4	75.00%	
Asian Games	NH			A	NH			QF; 1–1	NH			QF; 1–1	NH			QF; 2–0	NH		0 / 3	4–2	66.67%	
Asia Championships	NH	A	NH	A	NH	SF; 3–2	not held			A	NH	A	NH	A	NH	A	NH	A	0 / 1	3–2	60.00%	
East Asian Games^{1}	N/A		S 1–0	N/A			S 1–1	N/A											0 / 0	0–0	–	
World Junior Championships	absent			7th 5–0^{1}	A	QF; 1–1	Not Applicable												0 / 1	1–1	50.00%	
BWF tournaments
Malaysia Open	absent			Q2; 1–1	2R; 1–1	1R; 0–1	W 5–0	2R; 1–1	1R; 0–1	F 4–1	W 5–0	W 5–0	W 5–0	not held		SF; 3–1	SF; 3–1	F 4–1	4 / 13	37–9	80.43%	
India Open	NH	absent				1R; 0–1	A	1R; 0–1	A	QF; 2–1	absent			not held		absent		W 5–0	1 / 4	7–3	70.00%	
Indonesia Masters	NH			QF; 2–1	QF; 2–1	absent					NH	W 5–0	absent						1 / 3	9–2	81.82%	
German Open	absent					1R; 0–1	QF; 2–1	1R; 0–1	absent					not held		2R; 1–1	absent		0 / 4	3–4	42.86%	
French Open	absent			1R; 0–1	SF; 3–1	A	QF; 2–1	1R; 0–0	SF; 3–1	QF; 2–1	W 5–0	F 4–1	SF; 3–1	NH	A	SF; 3–1	F 4–1	SF; 3–1	1 / 12	32–10	76.19%	
All England Open	absent				2R; 1–1	SF; 3–1	1R; 0–1	1R; 0–1	SF; 3–1	SF; 3–1	W 5–0	W 5–0	F 4–1	W 5–0	A	SF; 3–1	SF; 3–1	SF; 3–1	3 / 13	38–10	79.17%	
Swiss Open	absent				QF; 2–1	1R; 0–1	QF; 2–1	absent						NH	absent				0 / 3	4–3	57.14%	
Thailand Open	absent			NH	2R; 1–1	absent		NH	absent					F 4–1	NH	W 5–0	absent		1 / 4	14–3	82.35%	
Thailand Open	absent			NH	2R; 1–1	absent		NH	absent					F 4–1	NH	W 5–0	absent		1 / 4	14–3	82.35%	
Malaysia Masters	not held		absent									F 4–1	QF; 2–1	F 4–1	NH	SF; 3–1	absent		0 / 4	13–4	76.47%	
Singapore Open	absent			F 6–1	2R; 1–1	2R; 1–1	QF; 2–1	QF; 2–1	F 4–1	1R; 0–1	W 5–0	A	W 5–0	not held		2R; 1–0	SF; 3–1	w/d 0–0	2 / 11	30–8	78.95%	
Indonesia Open	absent			1R; 2–1	2R; 1–1	1R; 0–1	QF; 2–1	2R; 1–1	2R; 1–1	W 5–0	QF; 2–1	W 5–0	SF; 3–1	NH	A	W 5–0	QF; 2–1	w/d 0–0	3 / 12	29–9	76.32%	
Australian Open	absent				QF; 2–1	1R; 0–1	A	QF; 2–1	1R; 0–1	QF; 2–1	SF; 3–1	absent		not held		absent			0 / 6	9–6	60.00%	
U.S. Open	absent			QF; 2–1	W 5–0	absent								not held			absent		1 / 2	7–1	87.50%	
Canada Open	absent				SF; 3–1	absent								not held		absent			0 / 1	3–1	75.00%	
Japan Open	absent			2R; 1–1	QF; 2–1	W 5–0	SF; 3–1	F 4–1	SF; 3–1	1R; 0–1	1R; 0–0	2R; 1–1	QF; 2–1	not held		SF; 3–1	SF; 3–1	SF; 3–1	1 / 13	30–11	73.17%	
Korea Open	absent			2R; 1–1	1R; 0–1	2R; 1–1	2R; 1–1	QF; 2–1	QF; 2–1	QF; 2–1	2R; 1–1	A	SF; 3–1	not held		A	F 4–1	A	0 / 10	17–10	62.96%	
Taipei Open	absent		Q1; 0–1	QF; 2–1	QF; 2–1	W 5–0	F 4–1	2R; 1–1	SF; 3–1	W 5–0	A	W 5–0	A	not held		W 5–0	W 5–0	QF; 2–1	5 / 12	39–7	84.78%	
Vietnam Open	absent		F 4–1	1R; 0–1	SF; 3–1	absent								not held		absent			0 / 3	7–3	70.00%	
Hong Kong Open	absent			2R; 1–1	A	1R; 0–1	2R; 1–1	W 5–0	QF; 2–1	W 5–0	W 5–0	SF; 3–1	A	not held			1R; 0–1	2R; 1–1	3 / 10	23–7	76.67%	
China Open	absent			1R; 0–1	absent		1R; 0–1	2R; 1–1	QF; 2–1	SF; 3–1	QF; 2–1	1R; 0–1	F 4–1	not held			SF; 3–1	1R; 0–1	0 / 10	15–10	60.00%	
Macau Open	absent			1R; 0–1	A	2R; 1–1	absent							not held				A	0 / 2	1–2	33.33%	
Arctic Open	absent				not held	absent								not held			QF; 2–1	A	0 / 1	2–1	66.67%	
Denmark Open	absent			2R; 1–1	QF; 2–1	A	1R; 0–1	1R; 0–1	2R; 1–1	F 4–1	SF; 3–1	W 5–0	W 5–0	absent		QF; 2–1	QF; 2–1	A	2 / 11	25–9	73.53%	
Korea Masters	absent		2R; 1–1	absent										not held		absent			0 / 1	1–1	50.00%	
Japan Masters	not held																QF; 2–1	w/d 0–0	0 / 1	2–1	66.67%	
China Masters	absent				1R; 0–1	absent							SF; 3–1	not held			2R; 1–1	w/d 0–0	0 / 3	4–3	57.14%	
New Zealand Open	absent			NH	QF; 2–1	NH	absent							not held					0 / 1	2–1	66.67%	
BWF Superseries / World Tour Finals	NH	did not qualify					F 3–2	W 4–1	RR; 1–2	W 4–1	RR; 2–1	RR; 1–2	F 3–2	W 4–1	DNQ	F 3–2	W 4–1	DNQ	4 / 10	29–15	65.91%	
Indonesia International	1R; 0–1	absent												not held		absent			0 / 1	0–1	0%	
Malaysia International	absent		2R; 1–1	absent										not held		absent			0 / 1	1–1	50.00%	
Vietnam International	Q2; 1–1	absent												not held			absent		0 / 1	1–1	50.00%	
Career statistics
	2007	2008	2009	2010	2011	2012	2013	2014	2015	2016	2017	2018	2019	2020	2021	2022	2023	2024	SR	W–L	Win %	Ref
Tournaments played	2	0	6	14	21	16	18	20	16	17	14	17	14	5	1	14	20	11	Career total: 226			
Titles	0	0	0	0	1	2	1	2	0	4	6	8	3	2	0	3	3	1	Career total: 36			
Finals	0	0	2	1	1	2	3	3	1	6	6	10	6	5	1	4	5	2	Career total: 58			
Overall W–L	1–2	0–0	9–5	19–14	34–20	24–16	33–16	32–18	33–16	48–13	46–6	59–9	46–12	21–4	5–1	42–11	53–17	24–9	36 / 226	529–189	73.68%	
Win (%)	33.33%	–	64.29%	57.58%	62.96%	60.00%	67.35%	64.00%	67.35%	78.69%	88.46%	86.76%	79.31%	84.00%	83.33%	79.25%	75.71%	72.73%	Career total: 73.68%			
Year-end ranking	405	–	158	20	16	10	7	7	9	1	1	1	2	1	1	2	4	8	1	$2,488,865.00		

^{1} Doesn't count in official record.

=== Women's doubles ===
Tournament	2009	2010	2011	SR	W–L	Win %	Ref
BWF tournaments
Indonesia Open	A	1R; 0–1	A	0 / 1	0–1	0%	
Malaysia Open	A	1R; 0–1	2R; 1–1	0 / 2	1–2	33.33%	
Korea Open	A	1R; 0–1	Q2; 0–1	0 / 2	0–2	0%	
Singapore Open	A	1R; 0–1	A	0 / 1	0–1	0%	
Macau Open	A	1R; 0–1	A	0 / 1	0–1	0%	
Vietnam Open	2R; 1–1	absent		0 / 1	1–1	50.00%	
Career statistics
	2009	2010	2011	SR	W–L	Win %	Ref
Tournaments	1	5	2	Career total: 8			
Titles	0	0	0	Career total: 0			
Finals	0	0	0	Career total: 0			
Overall W–L	1–1	0–5	1–2	0 / 8	2–8	20.00%	
Win (%)	50.00%	0%	33.33%	Career total: 20.00%			
Year-end ranking	–	87	172	$843.75			

=== Mixed doubles ===
Tournament	2007	2008	2009	2010	2011	2012	SR	W–L	Win %	Ref
National representation – Team
World Junior Championships	absent					QF; 1–0	0 / 1	1–0	100%	
BWF tournaments
Indonesia International	1R; 0–1	absent					0 / 1	0–1	0%	
Vietnam International	Q1; 0–1	absent					0 / 1	0–1	0%	
Career statistics
	2007	2008	2009	2010	2011	2012	SR	W–L	Win %	Ref
Tournaments	2	0	0	0	0	1	Career total: 3			
Titles	0	0	0	0	0	0	Career total: 0			
Finals	0	0	0	0	0	0	Career total: 0			
Overall W–L	0–2	0–0	0–0	0–0	0–0	1–0	0 / 3	1–2	33.33%	
Win (%)	0%	–	–	–	–	100%	Career total: 33.33%			
Year-end ranking	–	–	–	–	–	–	$0.00			

== Record against selected opponents ==
Record against Year-end Finals finalists, World Championships semi-finalists, and Olympic quarter-finalists. Accurate as of 7 August 2024.

Players	Matches	Results		Difference
Players	Matches	Won	Lost	Difference
(China) Chen Yufei	27	19	8	+11
(China) Han Yue	3	3	0	+3
(China) He Bingjiao	21	17	4	+13
(China) Li Xuerui	14	3	11	–8
(China) Lu Lan	2	2	0	+2
(China) Wang Shixian	12	5	7	–2
(China) Wang Xin	3	2	1	+1
(China) Wang Yihan	9	5	4	+1
(China) Wang Zhiyi	2	2	0	+2
(China) Zhang Yiman	5	4	1	+3
(China) Zhu Lin	2	1	1	0
(Chinese Taipei) Cheng Shao-chieh	1	0	1	–1
(Denmark) Tine Baun	2	1	1	0
(France) Pi Hongyan	2	0	2	–2
(Germany) Juliane Schenk	4	1	3	–2
(Hong Kong) Yip Pui Yin	10	9	1	+8

Players	Matches	Results		Difference
Players	Matches	Won	Lost	Difference
(Hong Kong) Zhou Mi	1	0	1	–1
(India) Saina Nehwal	20	15	5	+10
(India) P. V. Sindhu	24	19	5	+14
(Indonesia) Maria Kristin Yulianti	1	1	0	+1
(Indonesia) Lindaweni Fanetri	3	1	2	–1
(Indonesia) Gregoria Mariska Tunjung	9	9	0	+9
(Japan) Minatsu Mitani	8	5	3	+2
(Japan) Nozomi Okuhara	15	9	6	+3
(Japan) Akane Yamaguchi	24	13	11	+2 (Note: Tournament software did not include the women's team event of the 2022 Asian Games results for head-to-head.)
(Japan) Aya Ohori	12	10	2	+8
(South Korea) An Se-young	15	3	12	–9
(South Korea) Bae Yeon-ju	4	3	1	+2
(South Korea) Sung Ji-hyun	28	19	9	+10
(Spain) Carolina Marín	24	12	12	0
(Thailand) Porntip Buranaprasertsuk	9	5	4	+1
(Thailand) Ratchanok Intanon	36	20	16	+4

== Sponsorships ==
=== Yonex controversy ===
During the period of the 2016 Summer Olympics, Yonex provided unfit shoes to non-contract Tai. This forced Tai to wear other shoes made by her personal sponsor brand, Victor, without any logos. This event caused a controversy with the Chinese Taipei Badminton Association.
