= Bellaetrix Manuputty =

Indonesian badminton player

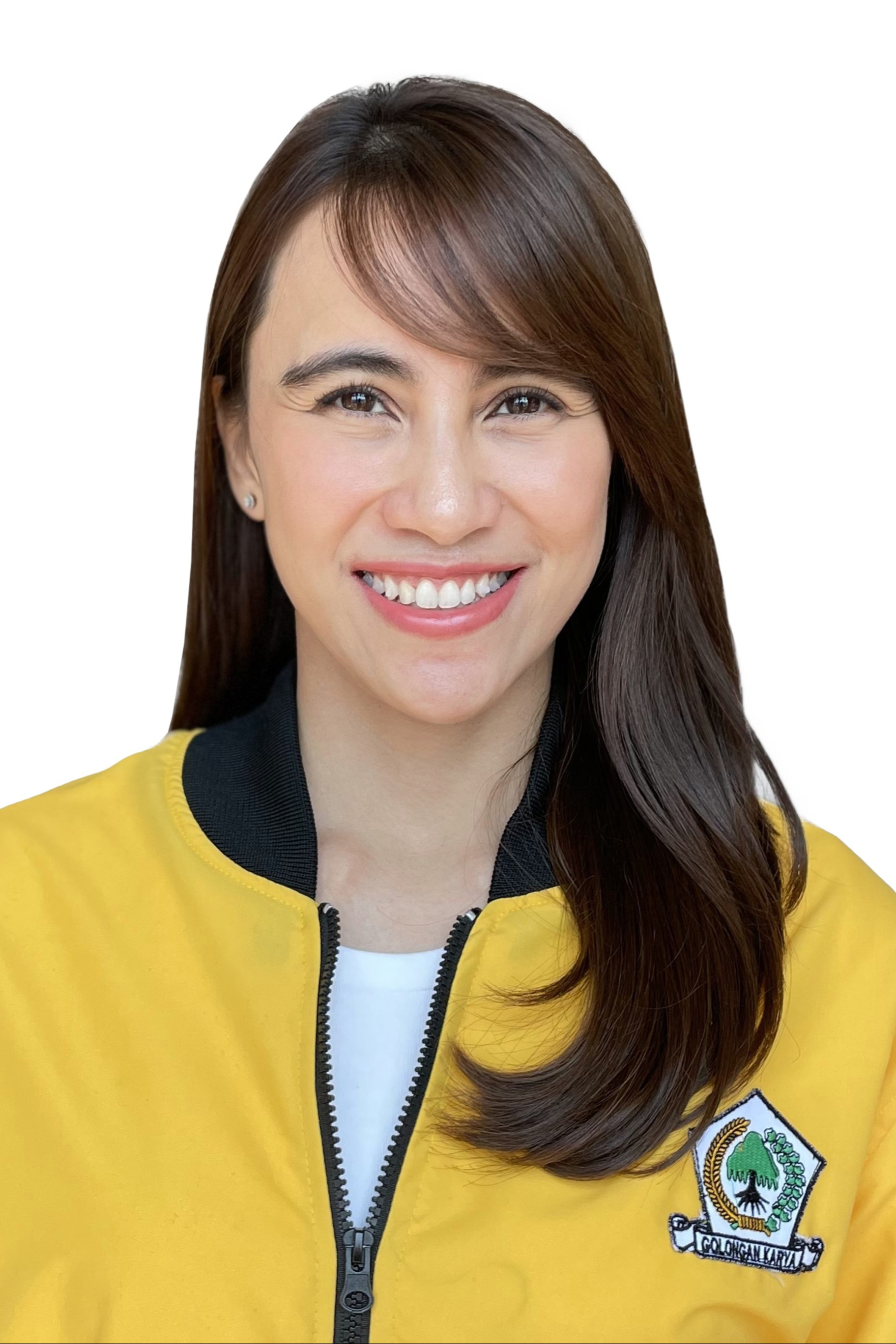

Personal information
- Born: 11 October 1988 (age 38) Jakarta, Indonesia
- Height: 1.66 m (5 ft 5 in)
- Weight: 53 kg (117 lb)

Sport
- Country: Indonesia
- Sport: Badminton
- Handedness: Right

Women's singles
- Highest ranking: 22 (12 July 2014)
- BWF profile
Medal record
Women's badminton
Representing Indonesia
Sudirman Cup
Bronze medal – third place	2015 Dongguan	Mixed team
SEA Games
Gold medal – first place	2013 Naypyidaw	Women's singles
Silver medal – second place	2011 Jakarta–Palembang	Women's team
Summer Universiade
Gold medal – first place	2011 Shenzhen	Mixed team
Asian Junior Championships
Bronze medal – third place	2005 Jakarta	Girls' singles
Bronze medal – third place	2005 Jakarta	Girls' team
Bronze medal – third place	2006 Kuala Lumpur	Mixed team

Bellaetrix Manuputty (born 11 October 1988) is an Indonesian badminton player.

== Career ==
In 2014 Asian Games, Manuputty advanced to quarterfinals after a match against P. V. Sindhu.

Manuputty advanced to main stage of 2015 All England Super Series Premier after winning the qualification versus Kati Tolmoff and Milicent Wiranto in the first and second phase respectively.

Manuputty advanced to the second round of 2015 Singapore Super Series, after she won the match against Yui Hashimoto. In the second round, Bellaetrix lost to Sun Yu.

In 2015 Sudirman Cup first round, Manuputty won against Line Kjaersfeldt. In the second round, she suffered knee injury in the match versus Li Xuerui. She was predicted absent for 3 months missing the SEA Games and 2015 Indonesia Super Series Premier. Manuputty stated that after further examination, her ACL muscle was torn about 20%.

2015 Chinese Taipei Masters Grand Prix was the first tournament Manuputty played after Sudirman Cup. She won the first round against Wendy Chen Hsuan-yu from Australia. In the second round, she had to stop in the first game versus Sung Shuo-yun due to relapsed knee injury she suffered in Sudirman Cup.

== Achievements ==
=== SEA Games ===
Women's singles
Year	Venue	Opponent	Score	Result	Ref.
2013	Wunna Theikdi Indoor Stadium, Naypyidaw, Myanmar	(Thailand) Busanan Ongbamrungphan	9–21, 21–13, 21–13	Gold	

=== World University Championships ===
Women’s singles
Year	Venue	Opponent	Score	Result	Ref.
2008	University of Minho, Campus de Gualtar, Braga, Portugal	(China) Wang Yihan	14–21, 16–21	Bronze	

=== ASEAN University Games ===
Women's singles
Year	Venue	Opponent	Score	Result	Ref.
2008	Kuala Lumpur Badminton Stadium, Kuala Lumpur, Malaysia	(Malaysia) Julia Wong Pei Xian	12–21, 19–21	Bronze	

=== Asian Junior Championships ===
Girls' singles
Year	Venue	Opponent	Score	Result	Ref.
2005	Tennis Indoor Senayan, Jakarta, Indonesia	(China) Wang Yihan	6–11, 4–11	Bronze	

=== BWF International Challenge/Series (1 title, 2 runners-up) ===
Women's singles
Year	Tournament	Opponent	Score	Result	Ref.
2010	Indonesia International	(Indonesia) Rosaria Yusfin Pungkasari	24–22, 15–21, 18–21	(silver) Runner-up	
2011	Malaysia International	(Indonesia) Hera Desi	21–19, 19–21, 21–12	(gold) Winner	

Women's doubles
Year	Tournament	Partner	Opponent	Score	Result	Ref.
2007	Smiling Fish International	(Indonesia) Samantha Lintang	(Indonesia) Yulianti (Indonesia) Richi Puspita Dili	Walkover	(silver) Runner-up	

BWF International Challenge tournament
BWF International Series tournament

== Performance timeline ==
Key

W	Won	F	Finalist	SF	Semi-finalist
QF	Quarter-finalist	#R	Rounds 4, 3, 2, 1	RR	Round-robin stage
Q#	Qualification round	A	Absent	w/d	Withdrew
G	Gold	S	Silver	B	Bronze
NH	Not held	N/A	Not applicable	DNQ	Did not qualify

=== Indonesian team ===
- Junior level

Team event	2005	2006
Asian Junior Championships	B	B

- Senior level

Team Events	2011	2012	2013	2014	2015
SEA Games	S	NH			A
Universiade	G	NH	A	NH	A
Sudirman Cup	A	NH	QF	NH	B

=== Individual competitions ===
- Junior level

Events	2005	2006
Asian Junior Championships	B	

- Senior level

Events	2013	2014
SEA Games	G	NH
World Championships	2R	2R
