= Hung Shih-chieh =

Taiwanese badminton player (born 1986)

Hung Shih-chieh 洪思婕
Personal information
- Born: 31 August 1986 (age 40)
- Height: 1.63 m (5 ft 4 in)
- Weight: 60 kg (132 lb)

Sport
- Country: Taiwan
- Sport: Badminton
- Handedness: Right

Women's doubles
- Highest ranking: 62 (4 November 2010)
- BWF profile
Medal record
Women's badminton
Representing Chinese Taipei
Asian Junior Championships
Bronze medal – third place	2004 Hwacheon	Girls' team

Hung Shih-chieh (Chinese: 洪思婕; pinyin: Hóng Sījié; born 31 August 1986) is a Taiwanese badminton player. Hung who attended Kaohsiung High School, was part of the national junior team that won the bronze medal at the 2004 Asian Junior Championships in the girls' team event. Hung later educated at the Taipei Municipal Institute of Physical Education became the runner-up at the 2007 and 2008 National College Sports Games in the women's singles event. At the international senior level, she was the women's doubles champion at the 2008 U.S. Open, and the semi-finalists in the women's singles event. She represented Chinese Taipei at the 2010 Asian Games.

== Achievements ==
=== BWF Grand Prix ===
The BWF Grand Prix has two level such as Grand Prix and Grand Prix Gold. It is a series of badminton tournaments, sanctioned by Badminton World Federation (BWF) since 2007.

Women's doubles
Year	Tournament	Partner	Opponent	Score	Result
2008	U.S. Open	(Chinese Taipei) Chang Li-ying	(Chinese Taipei) Tsai Pei-ling (Chinese Taipei) Yang Chia-chen	21–19, 21–14	(gold) Winner

BWF Grand Prix Gold tournament
BWF Grand Prix tournament
