= Lindaweni Fanetri =

Indonesian badminton player

Personal information
- Born: 18 January 1989 (age 37) Jakarta, Indonesia
- Height: 1.67 m (5 ft 6 in)
- Weight: 60 kg (132 lb)

Sport
- Country: Indonesia
- Sport: Badminton
- Handedness: Right

Women's singles
- Highest ranking: 11 (7 August 2013)
- BWF profile
Medal record
Women's badminton
Representing Indonesia
World Championships
Bronze medal – third place	2015 Jakarta	Women's singles
Sudirman Cup
Bronze medal – third place	2009 Guangzhou	Mixed team
Bronze medal – third place	2011 Qingdao	Mixed team
Bronze medal – third place	2015 Dongguan	Mixed team
Uber Cup
Bronze medal – third place	2010 Kuala Lumpur	Women's team
Asian Games
Bronze medal – third place	2010 Guangzhou	Women's team
SEA Games
Silver medal – second place	2009 Vientiane	Women's team
Silver medal – second place	2011 Jakarta–Palembang	Women's team
Bronze medal – third place	2015 Singapore	Women's team
Asian Junior Championships
Bronze medal – third place	2007 Kuala Lumpur	Mixed team

Lindaweni Fanetri (born 18 January 1989) is a former Indonesian badminton player. She played in women's singles. Fanetri is from PB. Suryanaga, a badminton club from Surabaya, the same club with the likes of Sony Dwi Kuncoro, Alvent Yulianto, and Rian Agung Saputro.

== Career ==
In 2012 Fanetri managed to become champion in India Grand Prix Gold and runner up at Chinese Taipei and Vietnam Open. In 2015 Fanetri won a bronze medal at 2015 BWF World Championships after losing to Saina Nehwal in the semifinals. In her quarterfinal match, she was down 14–20 in the second game after losing the first game against Tai Tzu-ying of Chinese Taipei. But Lindaweni saved 6 match points and eventually took the second game, 22–20. She won the decider third game to ensure her place in the semifinals.

== Achievements ==
=== BWF World Championships ===
Women's singles
Year	Venue	Opponent	Score	Result
2015	Istora Gelora Bung Karno; Jakarta, Indonesia	(India) Saina Nehwal	17–21, 17–21	Bronze

=== BWF Grand Prix (1 title, 2 runners-up) ===
The BWF Grand Prix had two levels, the Grand Prix and Grand Prix Gold. It was a series of badminton tournaments sanctioned by the Badminton World Federation (BWF) and played between 2007 and 2017.

Women's singles
Year	Tournament	Opponent	Score	Result
2012	Vietnam Open	(Thailand) Porntip Buranaprasertsuk	10–21, 18–21	(silver) Runner-up
2012	Chinese Taipei Open	(Chinese Taipei) Tai Tzu-ying	19–21, 22–20, 20–22	(silver) Runner-up
2012	India Grand Prix Gold	(India) P. V. Sindhu	21–15, 18–21, 21–18	(gold) Winner

BWF Grand Prix Gold tournament
BWF Grand Prix tournament

== Participation at Indonesian team ==
- 3 times at Uber Cup (2010, 2012, 2014)
- 4 times at Sudirman Cup (2009, 2011, 2013, 2015)

== Performance timeline ==
Key

W	F	SF	QF	#R	RR	Q#	A	G	S	B	NH	N/A	DNQ

(W) won; (F) finalist; (SF) semi-finalist; (QF) quarter-finalist; (#R) rounds 4, 3, 2, 1; (RR) round-robin stage; (Q#) qualification round; (A) absent; (G) gold, (S) silver or (B) bronze medal; (NH) not held; (N/A) not applicable; (DNQ) did not qualify.
To avoid confusion and double counting, these charts are updated at the conclusion of a tournament or when the player's participation has ended.

=== National team ===
- Junior level

Team event	2007
Asian Junior Championships	B

- Senior level

Team events	2009	2010	2011	2012	2013	2014	2015	2016
SEA Games	S	NH	S	NH			B	NH
Asian Games	NH	B	NH			QF	NH	
Uber Cup	NH	B	NH	QF	NH	QF	NH	A
Sudirman Cup	B	NH	B	NH	QF	NH	B	NH

=== Individual competitions ===
- Senior level

Events	2010	2011	2012	2013	2014	2015	2016
Asia Championships	1R	A					1R
Asian Games	A	NH			1R	NH	
World Championships	A	2R	NH	3R	3R	B	NH
Olympic Games	NH		DNQ	NH			RR

Tournament	BWF Superseries								Best
Tournament	2009	2010	2011	2012	2013	2014	2015	2016	Best
All England Open	A		Q1	Q2	QF	2R	1R	2R	QF (2013)
India Open	N/A		2R	A		SF	A	1R	SF (2010, 2014)
Malaysia Open	A	1R	QF	Q2	2R	1R	1R	1R	QF (2011)
Singapore Open	A		1R	1R	SF	1R	2R	1R	SF (2013)
Indonesia Open	Q2	2R	Q2	Q2	1R	1R	QF	1R	QF (2015)
Japan Open	A	Q1	1R	A	2R	A			2R (2013)
Korea Open	A		Q1	Q1	1R	A	1R	A	1R (2013, 2015)
Denmark Open	A				1R	A	1R	A	1R (2013, 2015)
French Open	A				1R	1R	1R	A	1R (2013, 2014, 2015)
China Open	A				1R	A			1R (2013)
Hong Kong Open	A	2R	A	1R	A		1R	A	2R (2010)
Year-end ranking	101	48	39	25	20	30	25	42	11

Tournament	BWF Grand Prix and Grand Prix Gold								Best
Tournament	2009	2010	2011	2012	2013	2014	2015	2016	Best
Malaysia Masters	w/d	A	1R	A				QF	QF (2016)
Philippines Open	1R	NH							1R (2009)
Thailand Open	A	NH	1R	A		NH	A		1R (2011)
Syed Modi International	A			W	NH	SF	A	1R	W (2012)
German Open	A			QF	2R	A		2R	QF (2012)
India Open	A	SF	N/A						SF (2010)
Swiss Open	N/A		QF	A		1R	1R	A	QF (2011)
Australian Open	A		1R	1R	QF	N/A			QF (2013)
New Zealand Open	2R	NH	N/A	NH	A			2R	2R (2009, 2016)
Chinese Taipei Open	Q2	1R	QF	F	1R	A	1R	A	F (2012)
Vietnam Open	QF	A		F	A		w/d	A	F (2012)
Bitburger Open	A	QF	A			QF	1R	A	QF (2010, 2014)
Macau Open	1R	A		QF	A	2R	2R	A	QF (2012)
Indonesia Masters	NH	1R	1R	SF	QF	A	QF	w/d	SF (2012)

== Record against selected opponents ==
Record against Year-end Finals finalists, World Championships semi-finalists, and Olympic quarter-finalists.

Players	Matches	Results		Difference
Players	Matches	Won	Lost	Difference
(Bulgaria) Petya Nedelcheva	2	1	1	0
(China) Chen Yufei	1	1	0	+1
(China) Li Xuerui	7	1	6	–5
(China) Wang Shixian	4	0	4	–4
(China) Wang Yihan	5	1	4	–3
(Chinese Taipei) Cheng Shao-chieh	1	1	0	+1
(Chinese Taipei) Tai Tzu-ying	3	2	1	+1
(Denmark) Tine Baun	1	0	1	–1
(Germany) Juliane Schenk	2	0	2	–2
(Hong Kong) Yip Pui Yin	2	1	1	0
(Hong Kong) Zhou Mi	1	0	1	–1

Players	Matches	Results		Difference
Players	Matches	Won	Lost	Difference
(India) Saina Nehwal	5	1	4	–3
(India) P. V. Sindhu	10	2	8	–6
(Japan) Minatsu Mitani	6	3	3	0
(Japan) Nozomi Okuhara	6	2	4	–2
(Malaysia) Wong Mew Choo	2	0	2	–2
(South Korea) Bae Yeon-ju	4	0	4	–4
(South Korea) Sung Ji-hyun	6	1	5	–4
(Spain) Carolina Marín	4	2	2	0
(Thailand) Porntip Buranaprasertsuk	5	1	4	–3
(Thailand) Ratchanok Intanon	5	1	4	–3
