= Sung Ji-hyun =

South Korean badminton player (born 1991)

Sung Ji-hyun 성지현 成池鉉
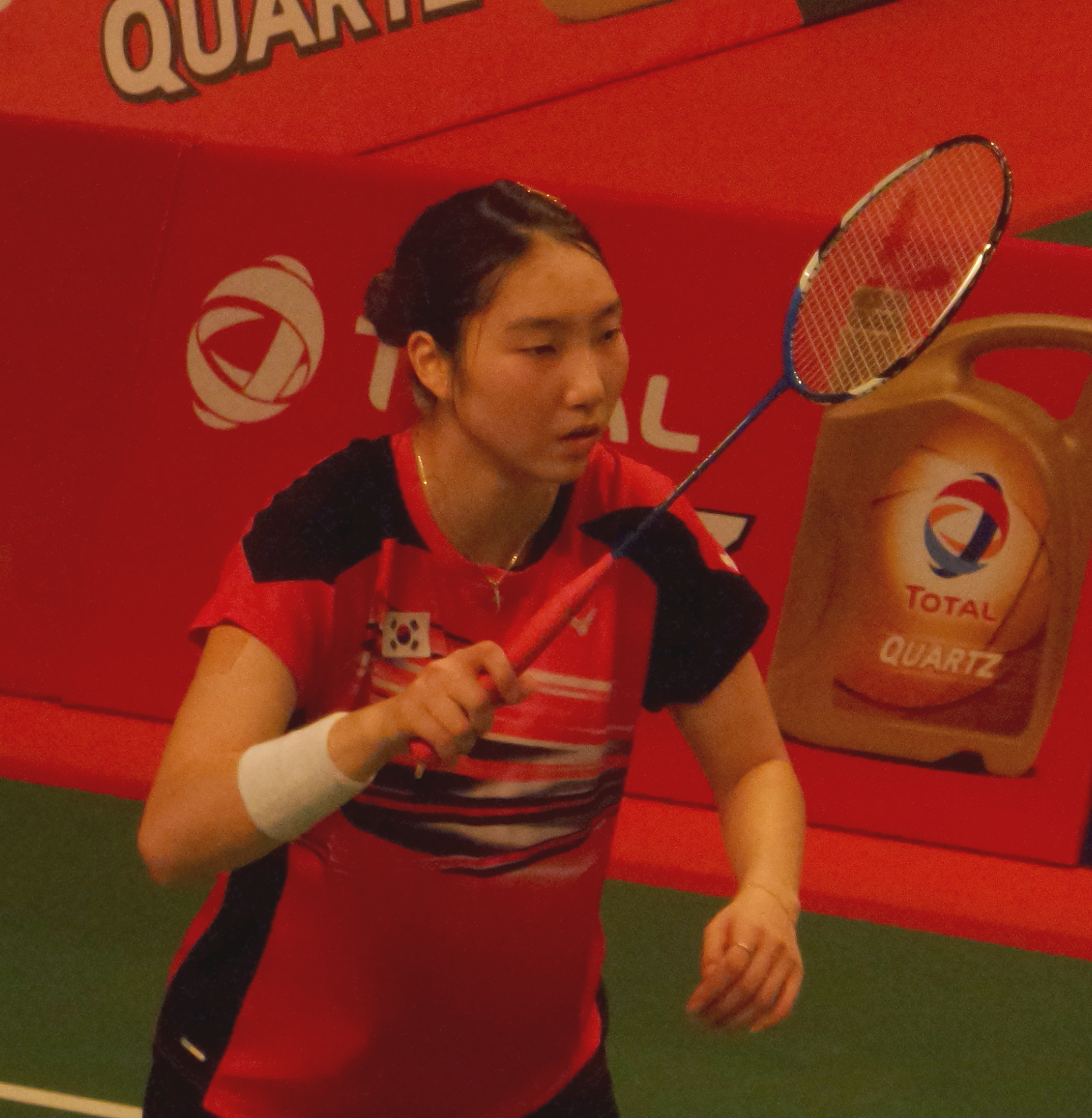
- Sung at the 2015 World Championships

Personal information
- Born: 29 July 1991 (age 35) Seoul, South Korea
- Years active: 2009–present
- Height: 1.75 m (5 ft 9 in)
- Weight: 56 kg (123 lb; 8.8 st)
- Spouse: Son Wan-ho (m. 2020)

Sport
- Country: South Korea
- Sport: Badminton
- Handedness: Right

Women's singles
- Career record: 384 wins, 207 losses
- Highest ranking: 2 (16 March 2017)
- Current ranking: 100 (18 October 2022)
- BWF profile
Medal record
Women's badminton
Representing South Korea
World Championships
Bronze medal – third place	2015 Jakarta	Women's singles
Sudirman Cup
Gold medal – first place	2017 Gold Coast	Mixed team
Silver medal – second place	2013 Kuala Lumpur	Mixed team
Bronze medal – third place	2011 Qingdao	Mixed team
Bronze medal – third place	2015 Dongguan	Mixed team
Uber Cup
Gold medal – first place	2010 Kuala Lumpur	Women's team
Silver medal – second place	2012 Wuhan	Women's team
Silver medal – second place	2016 Kunshan	Women's team
Bronze medal – third place	2014 New Delhi	Women's team
Bronze medal – third place	2018 Bangkok	Women's team
Asian Games
Silver medal – second place	2014 Incheon	Women's team
Bronze medal – third place	2010 Guangzhou	Women's team
Asian Championships
Gold medal – first place	2014 Gimcheon	Women's singles
Bronze medal – third place	2016 Wuhan	Women's singles
Bronze medal – third place	2018 Wuhan	Women's singles
Asia Mixed Team Championships
Silver medal – second place	2017 Ho Chi Minh	Mixed team
Asia Team Championships
Silver medal – second place	2020 Manila	Women's team
Bronze medal – third place	2016 Hyderabad	Women's team
Bronze medal – third place	2018 Alor Setar	Women's team
Summer Universiade
Gold medal – first place	2013 Kazan	Women's singles
Gold medal – first place	2013 Kazan	Mixed team
Gold medal – first place	2015 Gwangju	Women's singles
Gold medal – first place	2015 Gwangju	Mixed team
World Junior Championships
Silver medal – second place	2007 Waitakere City	Mixed team
Silver medal – second place	2008 Pune	Mixed team
Asian Junior Championships
Silver medal – second place	2008 Kuala Lumpur	Mixed team

- Sung Ji-hyun
- Hangul: 성지현
- Hanja: 成池鉉
- RR: Seong Jihyeon
- MR: Sŏng Chihyŏn

Sung Ji-hyun (Korean: 성지현; Hanja: 成池鉉; born 29 July 1991) is a South Korean badminton player from Seoul. She is an Asian Championship gold medalist, a two-time Summer Universiade gold medalist, and a World Championship bronze medalist. She was also part of South Korean teams that won the 2010 Uber Cup, 2017 Sudirman Cup, as well the team event at the 2013 and 2015 Summer Universiade. She competed at the 2010, 2014 and 2018 Asian Games, and at the 2012 and 2016 Summer Olympics. Sung is married to compatriot men's singles player, Son Wan-ho. She coaches An Se-young.

== Early life and education ==
Sung went into badminton following the path of her parents Sung Han-kook and Kim Yun-ja who both competed internationally in the 1980s.

== Career ==
She won the Korea Grand Prix Gold title in 2011. Unlike most South Korean badminton players Sung has focused on singles and in December 2011 she received a career high ranking of number seven in the world in that discipline.

In 2012, Sung's performances at Super Series event improved, and she reached semifinals in the Indonesia Open, Singapore Open and Japan Open. She was seeded 8th at the 2012 Olympics. However, she lost to Yip Pui Yin and did not make it past the group stage. She defended her Korea Grand Prix title at the end of the year.

Sung won her first Super Series Premier title early in 2013 at her hometown, at the Korea Open. This propelled her ranking up to world no.5, the highest of her career. Sung reached the semi-finals at the All England, losing to eventual winner Tine Baun in a match that lasted for 76 minutes, with a final score of 22–24, 21–19, 19–21. She later won the 2013 Chinese Taipei Open Grand Prix Gold against Tai Tzu-ying, 21–16, 21–9. Then, she reached the finals of 2013 Denmark Super Series Premier losing to Wang Yihan in 21–16, 18–21, 20–22. In 2013 Korea Open Grand Prix Gold, she went up against compatriot Bae Youn-joo and she was beaten in 3 sets, 21–19, 15–21, 21–9.

At the 2014 German Open Grand Prix Gold, she reached the final which Sayaka Takahashi won, 21–17, 8–21, 21–12. At the 2014 Badminton Asia Championships, she became the first South Korean in 10 years to win the title, beating 1st seeded Wang Shixian 21–19, 21–15. At the 2014 Chinese Taipei Open Grand Prix Gold, she won 21–13, 21–18 against Liu Xin. She qualified for the Dubai 2014 BWF Super Series Masters Finals and lost to Tai Tzu-ying in the final, 17–21, 12–21.

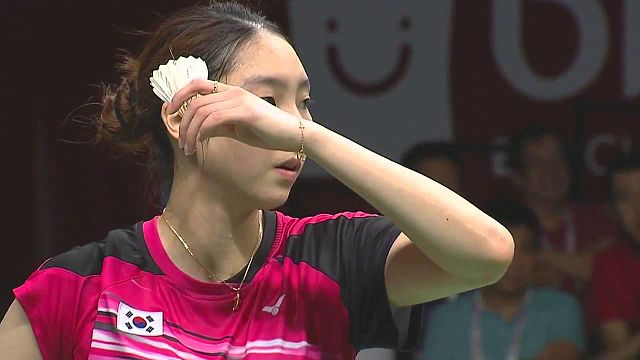
Sung at the 2015 BWF World Championships

She won the 2015 German Open Grand Prix Gold beating Carolina Marín 21–15, 14–21, 21–6. In 2017, she helped the South Korean national team to win the world team championships at the 2017 Sudirman Cup.

She coaches An Se-young.

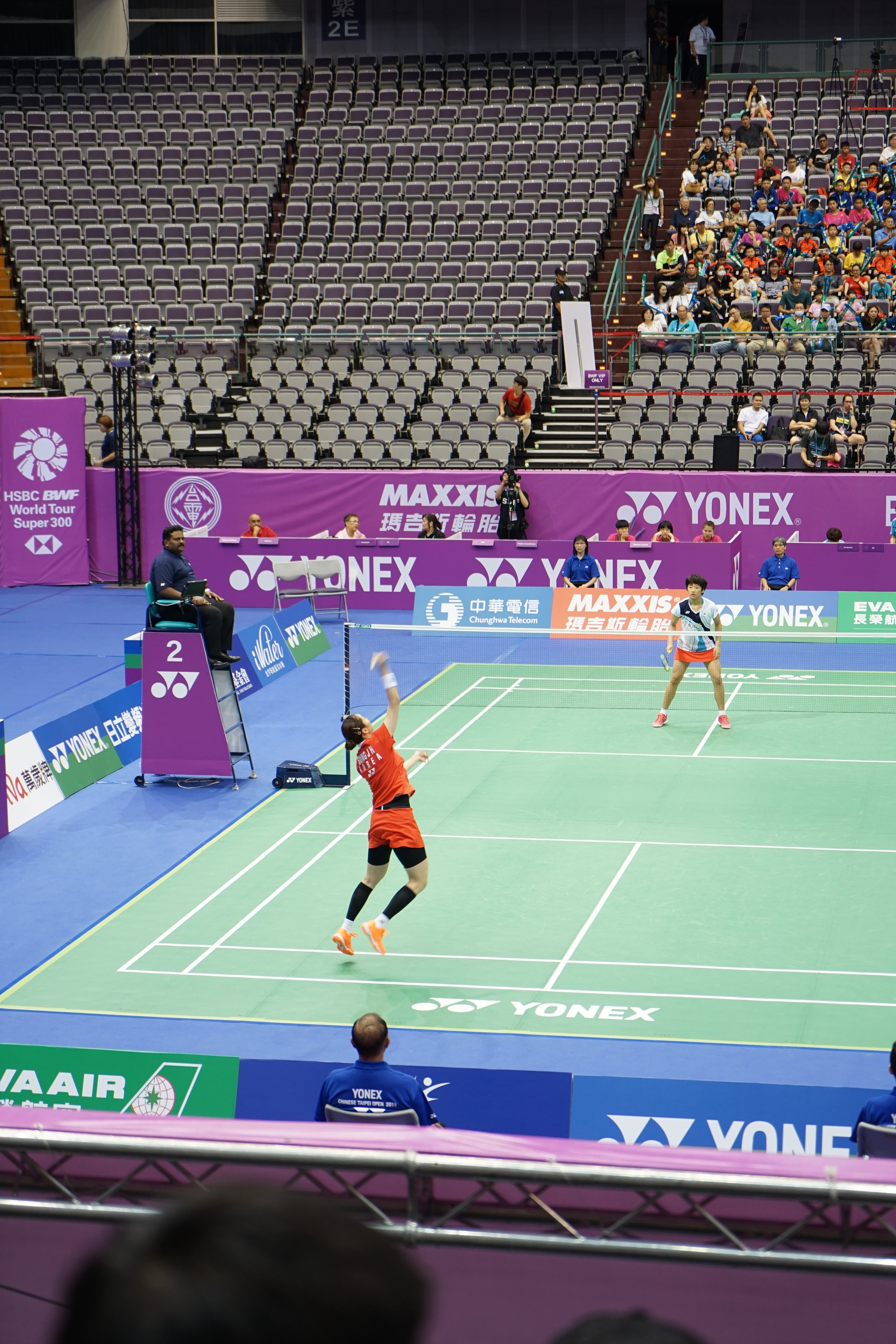
Sung Ji-hyun against An Se-young in the semi-final of 2019 Chinese Taipei Open

== Achievements ==
=== BWF World Championships ===
Women's singles
Year	Venue	Opponent	Score	Result
2015	Istora Gelora Bung Karno, Jakarta, Indonesia	(Spain) Carolina Marín	17–21, 21–15, 16–21	Bronze

=== Asian Championships ===
Women's singles
Year	Venue	Opponent	Score	Result
2014	Gimcheon Indoor Stadium, Gimcheon, South Korea	(China) Wang Shixian	21–19, 21–15	Gold
2016	Wuhan Sports Center Gymnasium, Wuhan, China	(China) Li Xuerui	20–22, 11–21	Bronze
2018	Wuhan Sports Center Gymnasium, Wuhan, China	(China) Chen Yufei	12–21, 13–21	Bronze

=== Summer Universiade ===
Women's singles
Year	Venue	Opponent	Score	Result
2013	Tennis Academy, Kazan, Russia	(Chinese Taipei) Tai Tzu-ying	21–16, 29–27	Gold
2015	Hwasun Hanium Culture Sports Center, Hwasun, South Korea	(Thailand) Porntip Buranaprasertsuk	21–18, 21–19	Gold

=== BWF World Tour (1 title, 1 runner-up) ===
The BWF World Tour, which was announced on 19 March 2017 and implemented in 2018, is a series of elite badminton tournaments sanctioned by the Badminton World Federation (BWF). The BWF World Tours are divided into levels of World Tour Finals, Super 1000, Super 750, Super 500, Super 300 (part of the BWF HSBC World Tour), and the BWF Tour Super 100.

Women's singles
Year	Tournament	Level	Opponent	Score	Result
2019	Chinese Taipei Open	Super 300	(Canada) Michelle Li	21–11, 21–9	(gold) Winner
2019	Korea Masters	Super 300	(South Korea) An Se-young	13–21, 17–21	(silver) Runner-up

=== BWF Superseries (2 titles, 6 runners-up) ===
The BWF Superseries, which was launched on 14 December 2006 and implemented in 2007, is a series of elite badminton tournaments, sanctioned by the Badminton World Federation (BWF). BWF Superseries levels are Superseries and Superseries Premier. A season of Superseries consists of twelve tournaments around the world that have been introduced since 2011. Successful players are invited to the Superseries Finals, which are held at the end of each year.

Women's singles
Year	Tournament	Opponent	Score	Result
2010	Korea Open	(China) Wang Shixian	10–21, 23–25	(silver) Runner-up
2013	Korea Open	(China) Wang Shixian	21–12, 22–20	(gold) Winner
2013	Denmark Open	(China) Wang Yihan	21–16, 18–21, 20–22	(silver) Runner-up
2014	Dubai World Superseries Finals	(Chinese Taipei) Tai Tzu-ying	17–21, 12–21	(silver) Runner-up
2015	Korea Open	(China) Wang Yihan	21–14, 17–21, 21–18	(gold) Winner
2016	Korea Open	(Japan) Akane Yamaguchi	22–20, 15–21, 18–21	(silver) Runner-up
2016	Dubai World Superseries Finals	(Chinese Taipei) Tai Tzu-ying	14–21, 13–21	(silver) Runner-up
2017	Indonesia Open	(Japan) Sayaka Sato	13–21, 21–17, 14–21	(silver) Runner-up

BWF Super Series Finals tournament
BWF Super Series Premier tournament
BWF Super Series tournament

=== BWF Grand Prix (10 titles, 3 runners-up) ===
The BWF Grand Prix had two levels, the BWF Grand Prix and Grand Prix Gold. It was a series of badminton tournaments sanctioned by the Badminton World Federation (BWF) which was held from 2007 to 2017.

Women's singles
Year	Tournament	Opponent	Score	Result
2011	Swiss Open	(India) Saina Nehwal	13–21, 14–21	(silver) Runner-up
2011	Chinese Taipei Open	(Thailand) Ratchanok Intanon	22–20, 21–14	(gold) Winner
2011	Korea Grand Prix Gold	(China) Han Li	21–18, 21–16	(gold) Winner
2012	Korea Grand Prix Gold	(Indonesia) Aprilla Yuswandari	21–10, 21–10	(gold) Winner
2013	Chinese Taipei Open	(Chinese Taipei) Tai Tzu-ying	21–16, 21–9	(gold) Winner
2013	Korea Grand Prix Gold	(South Korea) Bae Yeon-ju	19–21, 21–15, 9–21	(silver) Runner-up
2014	German Open	(Japan) Sayaka Takahashi	17–21, 21–8, 12–21	(silver) Runner-up
2014	Chinese Taipei Open	(China) Liu Xin	21–13, 21–18	(gold) Winner
2015	German Open	(Spain) Carolina Marín	21–15, 14–21, 21–6	(gold) Winner
2015	Thailand Open	(Singapore) Liang Xiaoyu	21–17, 22–24, 21–8	(gold) Winner
2016	Syed Modi International	(Japan) Sayaka Sato	12–21, 21–18, 21–18	(gold) Winner
2016	New Zealand Open	(Japan) Aya Ohori	21–15, 21–17	(gold) Winner
2016	Korea Masters	(South Korea) Lee Jang-mi	21–8, 21–10	(gold) Winner

BWF Grand Prix Gold tournament
BWF Grand Prix tournament

== Record against selected opponents ==
Record against year-end Finals finalists, World Championships semifinalists, and Olympic quarterfinalists. Accurate as of 21 January 2021.

Players	Matches	Results		Difference
Players	Matches	Won	Lost	Difference
(Bulgaria) Petya Nedelcheva	3	2	1	+1
(China) Chen Yufei	11	1	10	–9
(China) He Bingjiao	10	5	5	0
(China) Li Xuerui	14	1	13	–12
(China) Wang Lin	2	1	1	0
(China) Wang Shixian	12	5	7	–2
(China) Wang Xin	7	3	4	–1
(China) Wang Yihan	15	3	12	–9
(China) Zhang Yiman	1	1	0	+1
(Chinese Taipei) Cheng Shao-chieh	2	2	0	+2
(Chinese Taipei) Tai Tzu-ying	28	9	19	–10
(Denmark) Tine Baun	7	1	6	–5
(France) Pi Hongyan	3	1	2	–1
(Germany) Juliane Schenk	7	3	4	–1
(Hong Kong) Yip Pui Yin	11	8	3	+5

Players	Matches	Results		Difference
Players	Matches	Won	Lost	Difference
(Hong Kong) Zhou Mi	2	1	1	0
(India) Saina Nehwal	12	3	9	–6
(India) P. V. Sindhu	17	8	9	–1
(Indonesia) Lindaweni Fanetri	6	5	1	+4
(Indonesia) Gregoria Mariska Tunjung	5	4	1	+3
(Japan) Minatsu Mitani	8	7	1	+6
(Japan) Nozomi Okuhara	10	4	6	–2
(Japan) Akane Yamaguchi	10	5	5	0
(Japan) Aya Ohori	6	3	3	0
(Malaysia) Wong Mew Choo	1	1	0	+1
(South Korea) An Se-young	5	3	2	+1
(South Korea) Bae Yeon-ju	7	3	4	–1
(Spain) Carolina Marín	9	1	8	–7
(Thailand) Porntip Buranaprasertsuk	12	9	3	+6
(Thailand) Ratchanok Intanon	23	10	13	–3
