= Chen Jiayuan =

Singaporean badminton player (born 1991)

Chen Jiayuan 陈嘉园
Personal information
- Born: 16 February 1991 (age 35) Fujian, China
- Height: 1.76 m (5 ft 9 in)

Sport
- Country: Singapore
- Sport: Badminton
- Handedness: Right

Women's singles & doubles
- Highest ranking: 35 (WS 27 August 2015); 47 (WD 3 March 2011)
- BWF profile
Medal record
Women's badminton
Representing Singapore
Southeast Asian Games
Bronze medal – third place	2011 Jakarta–Palembang	Women's team
Bronze medal – third place	2015 Singapore	Women's team

Chen Jiayuan (Chinese: 陈嘉园; born 16 February 1991) is a Singaporean former badminton player of Chinese descent.

== Early life ==
The Fujian born player joined the Singapore national badminton team in 2005 and, in 2009, officially become a Singaporean citizen.

== Career ==
In 2010, she won the women's singles title at the Singapore International and in 2014 she won the Malaysia International Challenge tournament.

== Achievements ==
=== BWF International Challenge/Series ===
Women's singles
Year	Tournament	Opponent	Score	Result	Ref.
2010	Singapore International	(South Korea) Kwon Hee-sook	18–21, 21–16, 21–14	(gold) Winner	
2014	Malaysia International	(Indonesia) Gregoria Mariska Tunjung	21–11, 21–13	(gold) Winner	

BWF International Challenge tournament
BWF International Series tournament
