= 2016 China Masters Grand Prix Gold =

Tournament details
- Dates: 19 – 24 April 2016
- Level: Grand Prix Gold
- Total prize money: US$150,000
- Venue: Olympic Sports Center Xincheng Gymnasium
- Location: Changzhou, Jiangsu, China

Champions
- Men's singles: (China) Lin Dan
- Women's singles: (China) Li Xuerui
- Men's doubles: (South Korea) Lee Yong-dae (South Korea) Yoo Yeon-seong
- Women's doubles: (China) Luo Ying (China) Luo Yu
- Mixed doubles: (China) Xu Chen (China) Ma Jin

The 2016 China Masters Grand Prix Gold is the seventh Grand Prix's badminton tournament of the 2016 BWF Grand Prix and Grand Prix Gold. The tournament was held at the Olympic Sports Center Xincheng Gymnasium in Changzhou, Jiangsu, China on 19–24 April 2016 and has a total purse of $150,000.

== Men's singles ==
=== Seeds ===
1. (China) Chen Long (final)
2. (China) Lin Dan (champion)
3. (India) Srikanth Kidambi (first round)
4. (China) Wang Zhengming (first round)
5. (South Korea) Son Wan-ho (first round)
6. (India) Kashyap Parupalli (withdrawn)
7. (India) H. S. Prannoy (quarterfinals)
8. (South Korea) Lee Dong-keun (quarterfinals)
9. (Chinese Taipei) Hsu Jen-hao (first round)
10. (Japan) Sho Sasaki (second round)
11. (Thailand) Boonsak Ponsana (first round)
12. (Thailand) Tanongsak Saensomboonsuk (semifinals)
13. (India) Sameer Verma (withdrawn)
14. (Malaysia) Zulfadli Zulkiffli (withdrawn)
15. (Malaysia) Iskandar Zulkarnain Zainuddin (third round)
16. (Chinese Taipei) Wang Tzu-wei (first round)

=== Finals ===
Quarterfinals
1	(China) Chen Long	21	21
7	(India) H. S. Prannoy	10	15
12	(Thailand) Tanongsak Saensomboonsuk	21	21
8	(South Korea) Lee Dong-keun	13	18
(China) Lin Guipu	21	21
(Japan) Kazumasa Sakai	10	18
(China) Lu Guangzu	14	21	12
2	(China) Lin Dan	21	17	21

Semifinals
1	(China) Chen Long	21	19	21
12	(Thailand) Tanongsak Saensomboonsuk	15	21	14
(China) Lin Guipu	13	15
2	(China) Lin Dan	21	21

Final
1	(China) Chen Long	17	21
2	(China) Lin Dan	21	23

=== Top half ===
==== Section 1 ====
First Round
1	(China) Chen L	w	/	o
(Thailand) M Narongrit
(China) Ren PB	21	21
(Malaysia) Soo T Z	17	17
10	(Japan) S Sasaki	21	21
(Uzbekistan) A Savatyugin	10	5
(China) Shi YQ	21	21
(Japan) K Naraoka	17	10

Second Round
1	(China) Chen L	21	21
(China) Ren PB	11	17
10	(Japan) S Sasaki	12	19
(China) Shi YQ	21	21

Third Round
1	(China) Chen L	21	21
(China) Shi YQ	16	10

==== Section 2 ====
First Round
7	(India) H. S. Prannoy	19	21	21
(Malaysia) Soong J V	21	14	18
(China) Huang YX	21	17	21
(Chinese Taipei) Lin C-h	17	21	12
16	(Chinese Taipei) Wang T-w	17	17
(Malaysia) Liew D	21	21
(China) Ye BH	w	/	o
(Malaysia) Tan C S

Second Round
7	(India) H. S. Prannoy	21	21
(China) Huang YX	13	11
(Malaysia) Liew D	21	16	21
(China) Ye BH	18	21	15

Third Round
7	(India) H. S. Prannoy	21	21
(Malaysia) Liew D	10	15

==== Section 3 ====
First Round
3	(India) S Kidambi	12	17
(Chinese Taipei) Lin Y-h	21	21
(Chinese Taipei) Liu W-c	18	21	13^{r}
(Indonesia) F I Hadmadi	21	14	12
12	(Thailand) T Saensomboonsuk	21	21
(Venezuela) J W Zheng	14	15
(Chinese Taipei) Po L-w	18	17
(Indonesia) M B Pangisthu	21	21

Second Round
(Chinese Taipei) Lin Y-h	21	22
(Indonesia) F I Hadmadi	11	20
12	(Thailand) T Saensomboonsuk	21	21
(Indonesia) M B Pangisthu	10	18

Third Round
(Chinese Taipei) Lin Y-h	11	10
12	(Thailand) T Saensomboonsuk	21	21

==== Section 4 ====
First Round
8	(South Korea) Lee D-k	21	21
(Singapore) Derek Wong Z L	19	9
(Malaysia) Goh S H	15	11
(China) Sun FX	21	21
15	(Malaysia) I Z Zainuddin	21	21
(Japan) K Watanabe	15	16
(Thailand) K Wanaroon	10	7
(China) Zhu SY	21	21

Second Round
8	(South Korea) Lee D-k	21	21
(China) Sun FX	19	18
15	(Malaysia) I Z Zainuddin	21	21
(China) Zhu SY	19	19

Third Round
8	(South Korea) Lee D-k	18	21	21
15	(Malaysia) I Z Zainuddin	21	15	4

=== Bottom half ===
==== Section 5 ====
First Round
(China) Lin GP	21	21
(Singapore) Loh K Y	19	9
(China) Qiao B	21	21
11	(Thailand) B Ponsana	19	10
(China) Guo K	11	21	21
(Japan) Y Igarashi	21	13	17
(Uzbekistan) O Savatugin	1
5	(South Korea) Son W-h	3^{r}

Second Round
(China) Lin GP	21	21
(China) Qiao B	18	16
(China) Guo K	21	21
(Uzbekistan) O Savatugin	8	4

Third Round
(China) Lin GP	21	21
(China) Guo K	11	19

==== Section 6 ====
First Round
(China) Tang ZN	24	14	21
(Malaysia) Goh G C	22	21	11
(Chinese Taipei) Yang Y-h	w	/	o
13	(India) S Verma
(China) Zhao JP	21	23
(Indonesia) K H Wibowo	18	21
(Japan) K Sakai	21	21
4	(China) Wang ZM	15	17

Second Round
(China) Tang ZN	21	15	21
(Chinese Taipei) Yang Y-h	16	21	13
(China) Zhao JP	18	13
(Japan) K Sakai	21	21

Third Round
(China) Tang ZN	11	12
(Japan) K Sakai	21	21

==== Section 7 ====
First Round
(Chinese Taipei) Wu Y-c	5	13
(Japan) H Shimono	21	21
(China) Wu X	w	/	o
14	(Malaysia) Z Zulkiffli
(China) Lu GZ	21	21
(Uzbekistan) A Bakhshullaev	7	5
(Indonesia) F A Kholik	w	/	o
6	(India) K Parupalli

Second Round
(Japan) H Shimono	21	21
(China) Wu X	15	15
(China) Lu GZ	21	22
(Indonesia) F A Kholik	15	20

Third Round
(Japan) H Shimono	10	16
(China) Lu GZ	21	21

==== Section 8 ====
First Round
(Indonesia) A Susanto	13	6
(Japan) R Takeshita	21	21
(China) Zhou ZQ	21	21
9	(Chinese Taipei) Hsu J-h	15	11
(Chinese Taipei) Cheng P-w	w	/	o
(Malaysia) M A Abdul Latif
(Brunei) Jaspar Yu W C	11	6
2	(China) Lin D	21	21

Second Round
(Japan) R Takeshita	21	21
(China) Zhou ZQ	11	14
(Chinese Taipei) Cheng P-w	12	10
2	(China) Lin D	21	21

Third Round
(Japan) R Takeshita	13	17
2	(China) Lin D	21	21

== Women's singles ==
=== Seeds ===
1. (China) Li Xuerui (champion)
2. (India) Saina Nehwal (withdrawn)
3. (Japan) Akane Yamaguchi (withdrawn)
4. (India) P.V. Sindhu (quarterfinals)
5. (China) Sun Yu (final)
6. (China) He Bingjiao (quarterfinals)
7. (Japan) Yui Hashimoto (first round)
8. (South Korea) Bae Yeon-ju (quarterfinals)

=== Finals ===
Semifinals
1	(China) Li Xuerui	21	22
(Thailand) Porntip Buranaprasertsuk	14	20
(China) Chen Yufei	21	14
5	(China) Sun Yu	23	21

Final
1	(China) Li Xuerui	21	19	21
5	(China) Sun Yu	16	21	6

=== Top half ===
==== Section 1 ====
First Round
1	(China) Li XR	21	21
(Chinese Taipei) Pai Y-p	6	9
(Chinese Taipei) Sung S-y	12	15
(Japan) A Mine	21	21
6	(China) He BJ	17	21	21
PFQ	(China) Hui XR	21	15	15
(China) Li Y	21	19	17
(Japan) K Imabeppu	19	21	21

Second Round
1	(China) Li XR	21	21	21
(Japan) A Mine	23	10	8
6	(China) He BJ	21	21
(Japan) K Imabeppu	12	16

Quarterfinals
1	(China) Li XR	21	21
6	(China) He BJ	11	6

==== Section 2 ====
First Round
4	(India) P. V. Sindhu	21	21
Q2	(Japan) N Nidaira	16	12
(Chinese Taipei) Yu C-h	21	21
Q3	(China) Peng Q	18	19
7	(Japan) Y Hashimoto	10	19
(Thailand) P Buranaprasertsuk	21	21
(China) Shen YY	17	21	21
(Chinese Taipei) Chen H-h	21	12	14

Second Round
4	(India) P. V. Sindhu	21	21
(Chinese Taipei) Yu C-h	9	17
(Thailand) P Buranaprasertsuk	21	21
(China) Shen YY	16	9

Quarterfinals
4	(India) P. V. Sindhu	17	19
(Thailand) P Buranaprasertsuk	21	21

=== Bottom half ===
==== Section 3 ====
First Round
(Japan) A Ohori	17	18
(China) Chen XX	21	21
(Chinese Taipei) Hsu Y-c	10	12
8	(South Korea) Bae Y-j	21	21
Q1	(China) Li WM	21	21
(Canada) M Li	17	13
(China) Chen YF	21	21
PFQ	(Chinese Taipei) Hu L-f	11	13

Second Round
(China) Chen XX	12	18
8	(South Korea) Bae Y-j	21	21
Q1	(China) Li WM	14	18
(China) Chen YF	21	21

Quarterfinals
8	(South Korea) Bae Y-j	20	20
(China) Chen YF	22	22

==== Section 4 ====
First Round
Q4	(China) Ji ST	12	21	14
(Japan) S Kawakami	21	18	21
(Singapore) Liang XY	12	14
5	(China) Sun Y	21	21
(Chinese Taipei) Chiang M-h	14	21	12
(Thailand) B Ongbumrungpan	21	16	21
PFQ	(China) Gao FJ	22	21
PFQ	(China) Zhang YM	20	9

Second Round
(Japan) S Kawakami	12	15
5	(China) Sun Y	21	21
(Thailand) B Ongbumrungpan	21	21
PFQ	(China) Gao FJ	17	14

Quarterfinals
5	(China) Sun Y	21	21
(Thailand) B Ongbumrungpan	10	17

== Men's doubles ==
=== Seeds ===
1. (South Korea) Lee Yong-dae / Yoo Yeon-seong (champion)
2. (China) Chai Biao / Hong Wei (withdrawn)
3. (South Korea) Kim Gi-jung / Kim Sa-rang (final)
4. (South Korea) Ko Sung-hyun / Shin Baek-cheol (quarterfinals)
5. (China) Liu Xiaolong / Qiu Zihan (second round)
6. (Chinese Taipei) Lee Sheng-mu / Tsai Chia-hsin (withdrawn)
7. (China) Wang Yilyu / Zhang Wen (quarterfinals)
8. (India) Manu Attri / B. Sumeeth Reddy (first round)

=== Finals ===
Semifinals
1	(South Korea) Lee Yong-dae (South Korea) Yoo Yeon-seong	21	21
(China) Huang Kaixiang (China) Zheng Siwei	14	14
3	(South Korea) Kim Gi-jung (South Korea) Kim Sa-rang	15	21	21
(Japan) Takeshi Kamura (Japan) Keigo Sonoda	21	10	17

Final
1	(South Korea) Lee Yong-dae (South Korea) Yoo Yeon-seong	21	21
3	(South Korea) Kim Gi-jung (South Korea) Kim Sa-rang	17	14

=== Top half ===
==== Section 1 ====
First Round
1	(South Korea) Lee Y-d (South Korea) Yoo Y-s	21	21
(Thailand) D Puavaranukroh (Thailand) K Kittinupong	12	11
(Malaysia) Low J S (Malaysia) Tan K M	15	16
(Chinese Taipei) Lee J-h (Chinese Taipei) Lee Y	21	21
8	(India) M Attri (India) B S Reddy	19	16
(Netherlands) R Bosch (New Zealand) O Leydon-Davis	21	21
(Indonesia) F Alfian (Indonesia) M R Ardianto	21	16	21
(Japan) H Saeki (Japan) R Taohata	19	21	19

Second Round
1	(South Korea) Lee Y-d (South Korea) Yoo Y-s	21	21
(Chinese Taipei) Lee J-h (Chinese Taipei) Lee Y	18	12
(Netherlands) R Bosch (New Zealand) O Leydon-Davis	19	15
(Indonesia) F Alfian (Indonesia) M R Ardianto	21	21

Quarterfinals
1	(South Korea) Lee Y-d (South Korea) Yoo Y-s	21	23
(Indonesia) F Alfian (Indonesia) M R Ardianto	13	21

==== Section 2 ====
First Round
4	(South Korea) Ko S-h (South Korea) Shin B-c	21	21
(Japan) T Inoue (Japan) Y Kaneko	14	18
(Chinese Taipei) Chen H-l (Chinese Taipei) Wang C-l	21	21
(China) Li JQ (China) Zhu JH	11	15
5	(China) Liu XL (China) Qiu ZH	21	21
Q3	(China) Han CK (China) Zhou HD	15	13
(China) Huang KX (China) Zheng SW	21	21
(Malaysia) Chooi K M (Malaysia) Ow Y H	18	11

Second Round
4	(South Korea) Ko S-h (South Korea) Shin B-c	21	21
(Chinese Taipei) Chen H-l (Chinese Taipei) Wang C-l	14	11
5	(China) Liu XL (China) Qiu ZH	19	12
(China) Huang KX (China) Zheng SW	21	21

Quarterfinals
4	(South Korea) Ko S-h (South Korea) Shin B-c	15	19
(China) Huang KX (China) Zheng SW	21	21

=== Bottom half ===
==== Section 3 ====
First Round
Q4	(China) He JT (China) Tan Q	21	21	21
(Japan) T Hoki (Japan) Y Kobayashi	16	23	12
(Malaysia) Hoon T H (Malaysia) Teo K S	21	21
PFQ	(Chinese Taipei) Lin S-k (Chinese Taipei) Lu C-y	19	15
(Chinese Taipei) Huang P-j (Chinese Taipei) Tien T-c	21	21
Q1	(Chinese Taipei) Lee C-h (Chinese Taipei) Wu Y- c	8	16
(Thailand) B Issara (Thailand) N Puangpuapech	24	13	16
3	(South Korea) Kim G-j (South Korea) Kim S-r	22	21	21

Second Round
Q4	(China) He JT (China) Tan Q	21
(Malaysia) Hoon T H (Malaysia) Teo K S	13^{r}
(Chinese Taipei) Huang P-j (Chinese Taipei) Tien T-c	16	11
3	(South Korea) Kim G-j (South Korea) Kim S-r	21	21

Quarterfinals
Q4	(China) He JT (China) Tan Q	17	22
3	(South Korea) Kim G-j (South Korea) Kim S-r	21	24

==== Section 4 ====
First Round
(Singapore) Terry Hee Y K (Singapore) Loh K H	18	13
(India) P J Chopra (India) A Dewalkar	21	21
(Indonesia) W Nayaka (Indonesia) Hardianto	15	17
7	(China) Wang YY (China) Zhang W	21	21
(Chinese Taipei) Liao M-c (Chinese Taipei) Tseng M-h	15	13
(Japan) T Kamura (Japan) K Sonoda	21	21
Q2	(China) Bao ZL (China) Qi SS	19	23	15
PFQ	(Chinese Taipei) Liu W-c (Chinese Taipei) Yang P-h	21	21	21

Second Round
(India) P J Chopra (India) A Dewalkar	17	12
7	(China) Wang YY (China) Zhang W	21	21
(Japan) T Kamura (Japan) K Sonoda	21	21
PFQ	(Chinese Taipei) Liu W-c (Chinese Taipei) Yang P-h	15	9

Quarterfinals
7	(China) Wang YY (China) Zhang W	16	21
(Japan) T Kamura (Japan) K Sonoda	21	23

== Women's doubles ==
=== Seeds ===
1. (China) Luo Ying / Luo Yu (champion)
2. (China) Tian Qing / Zhao Yunlei (withdrawn)
3. (South Korea) Jung Kyung-eun / Shin Seung-chan (first round)
4. (South Korea) Chang Ye-na / Lee So-hee (quarterfinals)
5. (China) Tang Yuanting / Yu Yang (withdrawn)
6. (Japan) Naoko Fukuman / Kurumi Yonao (first round)
7. (Malaysia) Vivian Hoo Kah Mun / Woon Khe Wei (second round)
8. (South Korea) Go Ah-ra / Yoo Hae-won (first round)

=== Finals ===
Semifinals
1	(China) Luo Ying (China) Luo Yu	21	21
(Indonesia) Della Destiara Haris (Indonesia) Rosyita Eka Putri Sari	9	11
(China) Huang Dongping (China) Zhong Qianxin	13	4^{r}
(China) Chen Qingchen (China) Jia Yifan	21	3

Final
1	(China) Luo Ying (China) Luo Yu	16	21	21
(China) Chen Qingchen (China) Jia Yifan	21	15	18

=== Top half ===
==== Section 1 ====
First Round
1	(China) Luo Y (China) Luo Y	21	21
(Chinese Taipei) Chen H-h (Chinese Taipei) Huang M-c	8	14
(China) Chen L (China) Shen LJ	8	9
(Thailand) P Supajirakul (Thailand) S Taerattanachai	21	21
PFQ	(Russia) A Tyurina (Russia) D Tyurina	7	8
(Chinese Taipei) Hsieh P-c (Chinese Taipei) Wu T-j	21	21
PFQ	(Malaysia) Chow M K (Malaysia) Lee M Y	16	18
(India) J Gutta (India) A Ponnappa	21	21

Second Round
1	(China) Luo Y (China) Luo Y	10	21	21
(Thailand) P Supajirakul (Thailand) S Taerattanachai	21	10	14
(Chinese Taipei) Hsieh P-c (Chinese Taipei) Wu T-j	12	12
(India) J Gutta (India) A Ponnappa	21	21

Quarterfinals
1	(China) Luo Y (China) Luo Y	21	21
(India) J Gutta (India) A Ponnappa	11	14

==== Section 2 ====
First Round
3	(South Korea) Jung K-e (South Korea) Shin S-c	9	27
(Indonesia) D D Haris (Indonesia) R E Putri Sari	21	29
Q3	(China) An Y (China) Ni BW	21	21
PFQ	(Chinese Taipei) Hu L-f (Chinese Taipei) Yu C-h	12	3
8	(South Korea) Go A-r (South Korea) Yoo H-w	12^{r}
(Japan) M Matsumoto (Japan) W Nagahara	16
(Japan) Y Fukushima (Japan) S Hirota	21	21
(Chinese Taipei) Chang C-h (Chinese Taipei) Chang H-t	15	11

Second Round
(Indonesia) D D Haris (Indonesia) R E Putri Sari	21	21	21
Q3	(China) An Y (China) Ni BW	14	23	12
(Japan) M Matsumoto (Japan) W Nagahara	21	17	17
(Japan) Y Fukushima (Japan) S Hirota	17	21	21

Quarterfinals
(Indonesia) D D Haris (Indonesia) R E Putri Sari	12	25	21
(Japan) Y Fukushima (Japan) S Hirota	21	23	18

=== Bottom half ===
==== Section 3 ====
First Round
(China) Huang DP (China) Zhong QX	21	21
PFQ	(China) Cao TW (China) Tong H	10	12
Q2	(China) Guo XY (China) Liu HJ	12	9
7	(Malaysia) Vivian Hoo K M (Malaysia) Woon K W	21	21
(Indonesia) N P Lestari (Indonesia) M C Sahputri	w	/	o
(China) Du Y (China) Li YH
(Japan) S Tanaka (Japan) K Yonemoto	12	13
4	(South Korea) Chang Y-n (South Korea) Lee S-h	21	21

Second Round
(China) Huang DP (China) Zhong QX	21	21
7	(Malaysia) Vivian Hoo K M (Malaysia) Woon K W	17	18
(Indonesia) N P Lestari (Indonesia) M C Sahputri	10	14
4	(South Korea) Chang Y-n (South Korea) Lee S-h	21	21

Quarterfinals
(China) Huang DP (China) Zhong QX	21	21
4	(South Korea) Chang Y-n (South Korea) Lee S-h	19	19

==== Section 4 ====
First Round
(Chinese Taipei) Hsu Y-c (Chinese Taipei) Pai Y-p	18	16
(China) Ou DN (China) Yu XH	21	21
(China) Chen QC (China) Jia YF	21	21
6	(Japan) N Fukuman (Japan) K Yonao	16	18
Q4	(China) Tan Y (China) Yu XY	13	16
(China) Xu Y (China) Zhou CM	21	21
Q1	(China) Jiang BB (China) Tang PY	18	11
PFQ	(Indonesia) T R Nuraidah (Indonesia) R A Pradipta	21	21

Second Round
(China) Ou DN (China) Yu XH	14	12
(China) Chen QC (China) Jia YF	21	21
(China) Xu Y (China) Zhou CM	14	16
PFQ	(Indonesia) T R Nuraidah (Indonesia) R A Pradipta	21	21

Quarterfinals
(China) Chen QC (China) Jia YF	11	21	21
PFQ	(Indonesia) T R Nuraidah (Indonesia) R A Pradipta	21	12	9

== Mixed doubles ==
=== Seeds ===
1. (China) Xu Chen / Ma Jin (champion)
2. (Hong Kong) Lee Chun Hei / Chau Hoi Wah (withdrawn)
3. (South Korea) Shin Baek-cheol / Chae Yoo-jung (second round)
4. (China) Lu Kai / Huang Yaqiong (quarterfinals)
5. (South Korea) Choi Sol-gyu / Eom Hye-won (first round)
6. (Malaysia) Chan Peng Soon / Goh Liu Ying (semifinals)
7. (China) Zheng Siwei / Chen Qingchen (final)
8. (Indonesia) Edi Subaktiar / Gloria Emanuelle Widjaja (first round)

=== Finals ===
Semifinals
1	(China) Xu Chen (China) Ma Jin	21	21
6	(Malaysia) Chan Peng Soon (Malaysia) Goh Liu Ying	11	11
7	(China) Zheng Siwei (China) Chen Qingchen	21	21
Q4	(Japan) Yuta Watanabe (Japan) Arisa Higashino	17	11

Final
1	(China) Xu Chen (China) Ma Jin	21	21
7	(China) Zheng Siwei (China) Chen Qingchen	17	15

=== Top half ===
==== Section 1 ====
First Round
1	(China) Xu C (China) Ma J	21	21
(Thailand) B Issara (Thailand) S Amitrapai	16	14
(Indonesia) H Faisal (Indonesia) S D Aulia	21	21
Q1	(Chinese Taipei) Lee J-h (Chinese Taipei) Wu T-j	15	15
8	(Indonesia) E Subaktiar (Indonesia) G E Widjaja	21	19	14
(Chinese Taipei) Liao M-c (Chinese Taipei) Chen H-h	10	21	21
(China) Huang KX (China) Huang DP	21	25
(Singapore) D B Chrisnanta (Singapore) Vanessa Neo Y Y	18	23

Second Round
1	(China) Xu C (China) Ma J	21	21
(Indonesia) H Faisal (Indonesia) S D Aulia	19	18
(Chinese Taipei) Liao M-c (Chinese Taipei) Chen H-h	8	16
(China) Huang KX (China) Huang DP	21	21

Quarterfinals
1	(China) Xu C (China) Ma J	21	21
(China) Huang KX (China) Huang DP	12	13

==== Section 2 ====
First Round
3	(South Korea) Shin B-c (South Korea) Chae Y-j	21	21
(China) Fan QY (China) Chen L	16	15
Q3	(China) He JT (China) Du Y	21	10	21
(South Korea) Yoo Y-s (South Korea) Chang Y-n	16	21	16
6	(Malaysia) Chan P S (Malaysia) Goh L Y	21	23
(Japan) K Kazuno (Japan) A Kurihara	18	21
(Russia) E Dremin (Russia) E Dimova	21	17	14
PFQ	(China) Zhu JH (China) Zhou CM	16	21	21

Second Round
3	(South Korea) Shin B-c (South Korea) Chae Y-j	19	21	18
Q3	(China) He JT (China) Du Y	21	19	21
6	(Malaysia) Chan P S (Malaysia) Goh L Y	22	21	21
PFQ	(China) Zhu JH (China) Zhou CM	24	12	13

Quarterfinals
Q3	(China) He JT (China) Du Y	17	17
6	(Malaysia) Chan P S (Malaysia) Goh L Y	21	21

=== Bottom half ===
==== Section 3 ====
First Round
(Japan) K Sonoda (Japan) N Fukuman	15	17
(South Korea) Lee Y-d (South Korea) Lee S-h	21	21
(Indonesia) A E Prasetya (Indonesia) A Saufika	20	16
7	(China) Zheng SW (China) Chen QC	22	21
Q2	(Malaysia) Tan C T (Malaysia) Chow M K	16	19
(South Korea) Kim G-j (South Korea) Shin S-c	21	21
(Thailand) D Puavaranukroh (Thailand) S Taerattanachai	21	19	18
4	(China) Lu K (China) Huang YQ	18	21	21

Second Round
(South Korea) Lee Y-d (South Korea) Lee S-h	14	15
7	(China) Zheng SW (China) Chen QC	21	21
(South Korea) Kim G-j (South Korea) Shin S-c	16	21	15
4	(China) Lu K (China) Huang YQ	21	19	21

Quarterfinals
7	(China) Zheng SW (China) Chen QC	21	17	22
4	(China) Lu K (China) Huang YQ	12	21	20

==== Section 4 ====
First Round
(Indonesia) R Widianto (Indonesia) R P Dili	21	18	11
(Malaysia) Tan K M (Malaysia) Lai P J	15	21	21
(Singapore) Terry Hee Y K (Singapore) Tan W T	18	22	21
5	(South Korea) Choi S-g (South Korea) Eom H-w	21	20	12
(Chinese Taipei) Chang K-c (Chinese Taipei) Chang H-t	17	18
Q4	(Japan) Y Watanabe (Japan) A Higashino	21	21
(China) Zhou HD (China) Hu YX	21	21
PFQ	(Chinese Taipei) Yang M-t (Chinese Taipei) Sung S-y	13	15

Second Round
(Malaysia) Tan K M (Malaysia) Lai P J	21	19	14
(Singapore) Terry Hee Y K (Singapore) Tan W T	14	21	21
Q4	(Japan) Y Watanabe (Japan) A Higashino	21	16	21
(China) Zhou HD (China) Hu YX	16	21	11

Quarterfinals
(Singapore) Terry Hee Y K (Singapore) Tan W T	21	16	17
Q4	(Japan) Y Watanabe (Japan) A Higashino	13	21	21

Preceded by 2016 New Zealand Open Grand Prix Gold	BWF Grand Prix and Grand Prix Gold; 2016 BWF Season	Succeeded by 2016 Chinese Taipei Open Grand Prix Gold; 2016 Canada Open Grand Prix
