= 2017 BWF International Challenge =

Badminton championships

The 2017 BWF International Series was the eleventh season of the BWF International Series.

== Results ==
=== Winners ===
| Tour | Men's singles | Women's singles | Men's doubles | Women's doubles | Mixed doubles |
|---|---|---|---|---|---|
| Chinese International | (China) Sun Feixiang | (China) Cai Yanyan | (Indonesia) Mohammad Ahsan (Indonesia) Rian Agung Saputro | (China) Du Yue (China) Xu Ya | (Japan) Tomoya Takashina (Japan) Rie Eto |
| Iran International | (Indonesia) Panji Ahmad Maulana | (Russia) Ksenia Polikarpova | (India) M. R. Arjun (India) Shlok Ramchandran | (Singapore) Ong Ren Ne (Singapore) Crystal Wong Jia Ying | not held |
| Austrian Open | (Japan) Kanta Tsuneyama | (Scotland) Kirsty Gilmour | (Japan) Takuto Inoue (Japan) Yuki Kaneko | (Japan) Rira Kawashima (Japan) Saori Ozaki | (Denmark) Mikkel Mikkelsen (Denmark) Mai Surrow |
| Brazil International | (Sri Lanka) Niluka Karunaratne | (Japan) Haruko Suzuki | (Russia) Evgeny Dremin (Russia) Denis Grachev | (Brazil) Jaqueline Lima (Brazil) Sâmia Lima | (Brazil) Hugo Arthuso (Brazil) Fabiana Silva |
| Polish Open | (Malaysia) Tan Jia Wei | (Japan) Yui Hashimoto | (Poland) Łukasz Moreń (Poland) Wojciech Szkudlarczyk | (Indonesia) Yulfira Barkah (Indonesia) Meirisa Cindy Sahputri | (Poland) Robert Mateusiak (Poland) Nadieżda Zięba |
| Vietnam International | (Vietnam) Nguyễn Tiến Minh | (Thailand) Pornpawee Chochuwong | (India) Satwiksairaj Rankireddy (India) Chirag Shetty | (Japan) Erina Honda (Japan) Nozomi Shimizu | (China) Shi Longfei (China) Tang Pingyang |
| Osaka International | (Japan) Yu Igarashi | (Japan) Sayaka Takahashi | (China) Wang Sijie (China) Zhuge Lukai | (South Korea) Kim So-young (South Korea) Yoo Hae-won | (China) Wang Sijie (China) Ni Bowen |
| Orléans International | (Netherlands) Mark Caljouw | (Scotland) Kirsty Gilmour | (Chinese Taipei) Liao Min-chun (Chinese Taipei) Su Ching-heng | (Japan) Asumi Kugo (Japan) Megumi Yokoyama | (Germany) Mark Lamsfuß (Germany) Isabel Herttrich |
| Finnish Open | (Denmark) Rasmus Gemke | (Japan) Shiori Saito | (Chinese Taipei) Liao Min-chun (Chinese Taipei) Su Ching-heng | (Japan) Misato Aratama (Japan) Akane Watanabe | (Chinese Taipei) Tseng Min-hao (Chinese Taipei) Hu Ling-fang |
| Peru International | (Brazil) Ygor Coelho | (Canada) Michelle Li | (India) Alwin Francis (India) Tarun Kona | (Peru) Daniela Macías (Peru) Dánica Nishimura | (Peru) Mario Cuba (Peru) Katherine Winder |
| Smiling Fish | (Thailand) Pannawit Thongnuam | (China) Hui Xirui | (China) Kang Jun (China) Zhang Sijie | (Japan) Nami Matsuyama (Japan) Chiharu Shida | (China) Wang Sijie (China) Du Peng |
| Spanish International | (Japan) Yu Igarashi | (Denmark) Mia Blichfeldt | (Netherlands) Jacco Arends (Netherlands) Ruben Jille | (Japan) Ayako Sakuramoto (Japan) Yukiko Takahata | (Republic of Ireland) Sam Magee (Republic of Ireland) Chloe Magee |
| White Nights | (Spain) Pablo Abián | (Russia) Evgeniya Kosetskaya | (Germany) Mark Lamsfuß (Germany) Marvin Seidel | (Russia) Anastasia Chervyakova (Russia) Olga Morozova | (Germany) Marvin Seidel (Germany) Linda Efler |
| Lagos International | (India) Rahul Yadav Chittaboina | (Sri Lanka) Thilini Pramodika | (India) Manu Attri (India) B. Sumeeth Reddy | (Sri Lanka) Thilini Pramodika (Sri Lanka) Kavidi Ishadika | (Israel) Misha Zilberman (Israel) Svetlana Zilberman |
| Kharkiv International | (England) Toby Penty | (Ukraine) Natalya Voytsekh | (India) K. Nandagopal (India) Rohan Kapoor | (Germany) Johanna Goliszewski (Germany) Lara Käpplein | (India) K. Nandagopal (India) Mahima Aggarwal |
| Belgian International | (Japan) Kento Momota | (Spain) Beatriz Corrales | (Denmark) Frederik Colberg (Denmark) Rasmus Fladberg | (Netherlands) Selena Piek (Netherlands) Cheryl Seinen | (Netherlands) Jacco Arends (Netherlands) Selena Piek |
| Czech Open | (Japan) Kento Momota | (Turkey) Neslihan Yiğit | (Poland) Miłosz Bochat (Poland) Adam Cwalina | (Japan) Erina Honda (Japan) Nozomi Shimizu | (Denmark) Mathias Bay-Smidt (Denmark) Alexandra Bøje |
| Hungarian International | (Denmark) Victor Svendsen | (Turkey) Neslihan Yiğit | (Denmark) Frederik Colberg (Denmark) Rasmus Fladberg | (Russia) Ekaterina Bolotova (Russia) Alina Davletova | (Russia) Rodion Alimov (Russia) Alina Davletova |
| Malaysia International | (Malaysia) Iskandar Zulkarnain Zainuddin | (Indonesia) Ruselli Hartawan | (Malaysia) Goh Sze Fei (Malaysia) Nur Izzuddin | (Japan) Misato Aratama (Japan) Akane Watanabe | (Japan) Hiroki Okamura (Japan) Naru Shinoya |
| Tata Open | (India) Lakshya Sen | (India) Tanishq Mamilla Palli | (India) Arun George (India) Sanyam Shukla | (Singapore) Putri Sari Dewi Citra (Singapore) Jin Yujia | (Malaysia) Chen Tang Jie (Malaysia) Goh Liu Ying |
| Maldives International | not held | | | | |
| Italian International | (Spain) Pablo Abián | (Vietnam) Nguyễn Thùy Linh | (Netherlands) Jelle Maas (Netherlands) Robin Tabeling | (Russia) Ekaterina Bolotova (Russia) Alina Davletova | (England) Ben Lane (England) Jessica Pugh |
| U.S. International | (Chinese Taipei) Lu Chia-hung | (Japan) Natsuki Nidaira | (England) Marcus Ellis (England) Chris Langridge | (Canada) Rachel Honderich (Canada) Kristen Tsai | (Canada) Nyl Yakura (Canada) Kristen Tsai |
