= 2013 China Masters Super Series =

Tournament details
- Dates: 10 September 2013 - 15 September 2013
- Total prize money: US$250,000
- Venue: Olympic Sports Center Xincheng Gymnasium
- Location: Changzhou, People's Republic of China

The 2013 China Masters Super Series will be the seventh super series tournament of the 2013 BWF Super Series. The tournament will be held in Changzhou, China from 10–15 September 2013 and will have a total purse of $250,000.

== Men's singles ==
=== Seeds ===
1. (China) Chen Long
2. (China) Du Pengyu
3. (Thailand) Boonsak Ponsana
4. (Indonesia) Tommy Sugiarto
5. (Japan) Kenichi Tago
6. (Denmark) Jan Ø. Jørgensen
7. (China) Wang Zhengming
8. (Japan) Takuma Ueda

=== Top half ===
First Round
1	(China) Chen L
(India) A Pawar	w	/	o
(China) Song X	16	21	14
(Japan) S Sasaki	21	19	21
5	(Japan) K Tago	21	21
Q3	(China) Gao TY	17	14
(Israel) M Zilberman	21	21
(United States) S Pongnairat	19	18
3	(Thailand) B Ponsana	11	19
(South Korea) Lee D-k	21	21
Q4	(China) Zhou WL	21	19	21
(Indonesia) D Y Rumbaka	19	21	10
8	(Japan) T Ueda	17	18
Q2	(South Korea) Shon W-h	21	21
(Thailand) T Saensomboonsuk	21	21
(Chinese Taipei) Hsu J-h	14	15

Second Round
(India) A Pawar	21	14	16
(Japan) S Sasaki	12	21	21
5	(Japan) K Tago	21	21
(Israel) M Zilberman	7	9
(South Korea) Lee D-k	15	21	13
Q4	(China) Zhou WL	21	10	21
Q2	(South Korea) Shon W-h	16	21	21
(Thailand) T Saensomboonsuk	21	13	11

Quarterfinals
(Japan) S Sasaki	21	21
5	(Japan) K Tago	18	8
Q4	(China) Zhou WL	14	11
Q2	(South Korea) Shon W-h	21	21

Semifinals
(Japan) S Sasaki	21	16	18
Q2	(South Korea) Shon W-h	17	21	21

=== Bottom half ===
First Round
(Malaysia) M A A Latif	21	16	17
(Chinese Taipei) Chou T-c	18	21	21
(China) Tian HW	17	15
6	(Denmark) J Ø Jørgensen	21	21
(China) Chen YK	21	23
(India) A Jayaram	14	21
(Japan) K Momota	21	21
4	(Indonesia) T Sugiarto	17	14
(China) Gao H
Q1	(China) Tang JC	w	/	o
(Denmark) V Axelsen	13	18
7	(China) Wang ZM	21	21
(New Zealand) J W	14	14
PFQ	(China) Guo K	21	21
(Japan) K Sakai	21	21
2	(China) Du PY	13	15

Second Round
(Chinese Taipei) Chou T-c	13	14
6	(Denmark) J Ø Jørgensen	21	21
(China) Chen YK	19	21	18
(Japan) K Momota	21	14	21
Q1	(China) Tang JC	9	14
7	(China) Wang ZM	21	21
PFQ	(China) Guo K	21	12	17
(Japan) K Sakai	15	21	21

Quarterfinals
6	(Denmark) J Ø Jørgensen	21	17	21
(Japan) K Momota	17	21	6
7	(China) Wang ZM	21	21
(Japan) K Sakai	14	19

Semifinals
6	(Denmark) J Ø Jørgensen	13	21	21
(China) Wang ZM	21	16	23

=== Finals ===
Semifinals
(Japan) Sho Sasaki	21	16	18
Q2	(South Korea) Shon Wan-ho	17	21	21
6	(Denmark) Jan Ø. Jørgensen	13	21	21
7	(China) Wang Zhengming	21	16	23

Final
Q2	(South Korea) Shon Wan-ho	21	14	22
7	(China) Wang Zhengming	11	21	24

== Women's singles ==
=== Seeds ===
1. (China) Li Xuerui
2. (Thailand) Ratchanok Intanon
3. (China) Wang Yihan
4. (South Korea) Sung Ji-hyun
5. (China) Wang Shixian
6. (Chinese Taipei) Tai Tzu-ying
7. (Japan) Minatsu Mitani
8. (South Korea) Bae Youn-joo

=== Top half ===
First Round
1	(China) Li XR	21	21
(Indonesia) B Manuputi	18	8
5	(China) Wang SX
(Singapore) Gu J	w	/	o
(Thailand) S Taerattanachai	21	21
(Canada) C Reid	10	7
4	(South Korea) Sung J-h	21	21
(New Zealand) A Rankin	10	15
(United States) J Subandhi	5	10
(China) Han L	21	21
7	(Japan) M Mitani	21	21
(Thailand) N Jindapon	15	13
(Austria) S Prutsch	9	19
(Thailand) P Buranaprasertsuk	21	21

Second Round
1	(China) Li XR	w	/	o
(China) Yu S
(Singapore) Gu J	21	21
(Thailand) S Taerattanachai	13	11
4	(South Korea) Sung J-h	18	21	14
(China) Han L	21	14	21
7	(Japan) M Mitani	21	18	22
(Thailand) P Buranaprasertsuk	16	21	24

Quarterfinals
1	(China) Li XR	21	22
(Singapore) Gu J	10	20
(China) Han L	19	17
(Thailand) P Buranaprasertsuk	21	21

Semifinals
1	(China) Li XR	16	21	20
(Thailand) P Buranaprasertsuk	21	15	22

=== Bottom half ===
First Round
(Thailand) B Ongbumrungpan	15	18
(China) Yao X	21	21
Q1	(China) Fan MY	17	15
PFQ	(China) Hui XR	21	21
Q3	(China) Wang X	21	21
(China) Deng X	11	19
(Japan) S Takahashi	w	/	o
3	(China) Wang YH
Q2	(China) Shen YY	14	12
(China) Liu X	21	21
(Chinese Taipei) Chang Y-l	6	12
8	(South Korea) Bae Y-j	21	21
(Canada) N Grether	16	9
(Japan) E Hirose	21	21
PFQ	(Thailand) N Saengchote	14	9
PFQ	(China) Suo D	21	21

Second Round
(China) Yao X	21	21
PFQ	(China) Hui XR	13	14
Q3	(China) Wang X	13	16
(Japan) S Takahashi	21	21
(China) Liu X	21	21
8	(South Korea) Bae Y-j	14	17
(Japan) E Hirose	21	15	16
PFQ	(China) Suo D	7	21	21

Quarterfinals
(China) Yao X	16	20
(Japan) S Takahashi	21	22
(China) Liu X	w	/	o
PFQ	(China) Suo D

Semifinals
(Japan) S Takahashi	17	15
(China) Liu X	21	21

=== Finals ===
Semifinals
1	(China) Li Xuerui	16	21	20
(Thailand) Porntip Buranaprasertsuk	21	15	22
(Japan) Sayaka Takahashi	17	15
(China) Liu Xin	21	21

Final
(Thailand) Porntip Buranaprasertsuk	4	21	12
(China) Liu Xin	21	13	21

== Men's doubles ==
=== Seeds ===
1. (South Korea) Ko Sung-hyun / Lee Yong-dae
2. (Japan) Hiroyuki Endo / Kenichi Hayakawa
3. (South Korea) Kim Ki-jung / Kim Sa-rang
4. (China) Liu Xiaolong / Qiu Zihan
5. (China) Cai Yun / Fu Haifeng
6. (South Korea) Shin Baek-cheol / Yoo Yeon-seong
7. (Malaysia) Mohd Zakry Abdul Latif / Mohd Fairuzizuan Mohd Tazari
8. (Japan) Hirokatsu Hashimoto / Noriyasu Hirata

=== Top half ===
First Round
1	(South Korea) Ko S-h (South Korea) Lee Y-d	21	21
(China) Guo ZD (China) Shen Y	14	11
(China) Shi LF (China) Zhang NY	21	21
(Australia) R Tam (Australia) G Warfe	16	12
(China) Pei TY (China) Wang TY	17	20
(Thailand) W Ampunsuwan (Thailand) P Chalardchaleam	21	22
4	(China) Liu XL (China) Qiu ZH	21	17	21
(Singapore) T Hee (Singapore) Z J T Yeo	17	21	17
(China) Kang J (China) Liu C	21	21
(New Zealand) K Dennerly-Minturn (New Zealand) O Leydon-Davis	14	14
5	(China) Cai Y (China) Fu HF
(Denmark) M Conrad-Petersen (Denmark) M Pieler Kolding	w	/	o
(China) Huang KX (China) Zheng SW	21	21
(United States) P Chew (United States) S Pongnairat	11	10

Second Round
1	(South Korea) Ko S-h (South Korea) Lee Y-d	21	21
(China) Shi LF (China) Zhang NY	6	9
8	(Japan) H Hashimoto (Japan) N Hirata	21	21
(Thailand) W Ampunsuwan (Thailand) P Chalardchaleam	11	25
4	(China) Liu XL (China) Qiu ZH	21	21
(China) Kang J (China) Liu C	12	14
(Denmark) M Conrad-Petersen (Denmark) M Pieler Kolding	13	15
(China) Huang KX (China) Zheng SW	21	21

Quarterfinals
1	(South Korea) Ko S-h (South Korea) Lee Y-d	21	18	21
8	(Japan) H Hashimoto (Japan) N Hirata	10	21	6
4	(China) Liu XL (China) Qiu ZH	21	21
(China) Huang KX (China) Zheng SW	16	17

Semifinals
1	(South Korea) Ko S-h (South Korea) Lee Y-d	21	21
4	(China) Liu XL (China) Qiu ZH	13	12

=== Bottom half ===
First Round
(Indonesia) M F Gideon (Indonesia) M Kido	21	18	21
(China) Song ZW (China) Xu XF	19	21	17
(Chinese Taipei) Lu C-p (Chinese Taipei) Wang C-h	21	21
7	(Malaysia) M Z A Latif (Malaysia) M F M Tazari	17	19
(China) Bao ZL (China) Yu XY	19	20
Q4	(China) He JT (China) Wang P	21	22
(China) Chai B (China) Hong W	14	23	24
3	(South Korea) Kim K-j (South Korea) Kim S-r	21	21	22
(China) Chen ZF (China) Kai L	21	21	19
(Chinese Taipei) Liang J-w (Chinese Taipei) Liao K-h	23	16	21
(China) Li JH (China) Liu YC	11	21	21
6	(South Korea) Shin B-c (South Korea) Yoo Y-s	21	16	19
Q3	(China) Luo C (China) Ju FPY	21	21
(Malaysia) Gan T C (Malaysia) Ong S H	17	16
Q1	(China) Li JY (China) Li R	11	17
2	(Japan) H Endo (Japan) K Hayakawa	21	21

Second Round
(Indonesia) M F Gideon (Indonesia) M Kido	21	25
(Chinese Taipei) Lu C-p (Chinese Taipei) Wang C-h	11	23
Q4	(China) He JT (China) Wang P	9	13
(China) Chai B (China) Hong W	21	21
(Chinese Taipei) Liang J-w (Chinese Taipei) Liao K-h	21	21
(China) Li JH (China) Liu YC	18	19
Q3	(China) Luo C (China) J FPY	10	13
2	(Japan) H Endo (Japan) K Hayakawa	21	21

Quarterfinals
(Indonesia) M F Gideon (Indonesia) M Kido	17	16
(China) Chai B (China) Hong W	21	21
(Chinese Taipei) Liang J-w (Chinese Taipei) Liao K-h	15	10
2	(Japan) H Endo (Japan) K Hayakawa	21	21

Semifinals
(China) Chai B (China) Hong W	21	18	13
2	(Japan) H Endo (Japan) K Hayakawa	14	21	21

=== Finals ===
Semifinals
1	(South Korea) Ko Sung-hyun (South Korea) Lee Yong-dae	21	21
4	(China) Liu Xiaolong (China) Qiu Zihan	13	12
(China) Chai Biao (China) Hong Wei	21	18	13
2	(Japan) Hiroyuki Endo (Japan) Kenichi Hayakawa	14	21	21

Final
(South Korea) Ko Sung-hyun (South Korea) Lee Yong-dae	25	21
(Japan) Hiroyuki Endo (Japan) Kenichi Hayakawa	23	19

== Women's doubles ==
=== Seeds ===
1. (China) Wang Xiaoli / Yu Yang
2. (China) Ma Jin / Tang Jinhua
3. (Japan) Misaki Matsutomo / Ayaka Takahashi
4. (Indonesia) Pia Zebadiah Bernadeth / Rizki Amelia Pradipta
5. (China) Bao Yixin / Zhong Qianxin
6. (South Korea) Jung Kyung-eun / Kim Ha-na
7. (Thailand) Duanganong Aroonkesorn / Kunchala Voravichitchaikul
8. (Japan) Reika Kakiiwa / Miyuki Maeda

=== Top half ===
First Round
1	(China) Wang XL (China) Yu Y	21	21
(South Korea) Ko A-r (South Korea) Yoo H-w	14	16
(Singapore) Fu MT (Singapore) Y Y V Neo	17	21	23
(Thailand) S Amitrapai (Thailand) N Lam	21	18	25
5	(China) Bao YX (China) Zhong QX	21	21
(Canada) N Grether (Canada) C Reid	16	7
(Indonesia) N K Maheswari (Indonesia) G Polii	21	21
Q2	(China) Liu LL (China) Wang QDQ	13	10
3	(Japan) M Matsutomo (Japan) A Takahashi	w	/	o
(China) Cheng S (China) Zhao YL
(China) Huang DP (China) Jia YF
PFQ	(China) Du P (China) Xiong MJ	w	/	o
8	(Japan) R Kakiiwa (Japan) M Maeda	14	21	8
(China) Ou DN (China) Tang YT	21	17	21

Second Round
1	(China) Wang XL (China) Yu Y	21	21
(Thailand) S Amitrapai (Thailand) N Lam	17	10
5	(China) Bao YX (China) Zhong QX
(Indonesia) N K Maheswari (Indonesia) G Polii	w	/	o
3	(Japan) M Matsutomo (Japan) A Takahashi	21	15	21
PFQ	(China) Du P (China) Xiong MJ	7	21	16
(China) Ou DN (China) Tang YT	21	21
(Thailand) P Supajirakul (Thailand) S Taerattanachai	16	15

Quarterfinals
1	(China) Wang XL (China) Yu Y	21	21
(Indonesia) N K Maheswari (Indonesia) G Polii	16	11
3	(Japan) M Matsutomo (Japan) A Takahashi	17	20
(China) Ou DN (China) Tang YT	21	22

Semifinals
1	(China) Wang XL (China) Yu Y	21	21
(China) Ou DN (China) Tang YT	13	6

=== Bottom half ===
First Round
(South Korea) Jang Y-n (South Korea) Kim S-y	21	21
(Malaysia) Ng H E (Malaysia) Ng H L	18	12
(China) Luo Y (China) Luo Y	21	21
7	(Thailand) D Aroonkesorn (Thailand) K Voravichitchaikul	12	14
(China) Yu XH (China) Huang YQ
(Singapore) S M Sari (Singapore) Yao L	w	/	o
(China) Du Y (China) Li YH	19	12
4	(Indonesia) P Z Bernadeth (Indonesia) R A Pradipta	21	21
Q3	(China) Jiang BB (China) Tang PY	21	15	21
Q4	(China) Fu X (China) Zheng XH	13	21	15
(Indonesia) G R Imawan (Indonesia) T R Nuraidah	19	17
(South Korea) Jung K-e (South Korea) Kim H-n	21	21
(Japan) Y Miki (Japan) K Yonemoto	21	21
(Thailand) N Saengchote (Thailand) S Suwannakitborihan	7	12
PFQ	(New Zealand) A Rankin (New Zealand) M Stapleton	6	18
2	(China) Ma J (China) Tang JH	21	21

Second Round
(South Korea) Jang Y-n (South Korea) Kim S-y	21	21
(China) Luo Y (China) Luo Y	17	19
(Singapore) S M Sari (Singapore) Yao L	18	21	17
4	(Indonesia) P Z Bernadeth (Indonesia) R A Pradipta	21	16	21
Q3	(China) Jiang BB (China) Tang PY	10	17
6	(South Korea) Jung K-e (South Korea) Kim H-n	21	21
(Japan) Y Miki (Japan) K Yonemoto	11	11
2	(China) Ma J (China) Tang JH	21	21

Quarterfinals
(South Korea) Jang Y-n (South Korea) Kim S-h	21	18	21
4	(Indonesia) P Z Bernadeth (Indonesia) R A Pradipta	17	21	10
6	(South Korea) Jung K-e (South Korea) Kim H-n	14	21	19
2	(China) Ma J (China) Tang JH	21	14	21

Semifinals
(South Korea) Jang Y-n (South Korea) Kim S-y	18	13
2	(China) Ma J (China) Tang JH	21	21

=== Finals ===
Semifinals
1	(China) Wang Xiaoli (China) Yu Yang	21	21
(China) Ou Dongni (China) Tang Yuanting	13	6
(South Korea) Jang Ye-na (South Korea) Kim So-young	18	13
2	(China) Ma Jin (China) Tang Jinhua	21	21

Final
1	(China) Wang Xiaoli (China) Yu Yang	21	21
2	(China) Ma Jin (China) Tang Jinhua	17	16

== Mixed doubles ==
=== Seeds ===
1. (China) Xu Chen / Ma Jin
2. (China) Zhang Nan / Zhao Yunlei
3. (Thailand) Sudket Prapakamol / Saralee Thoungthongkam
4. (Indonesia) Markis Kido / Pia Zebadiah Bernadeth
5. (South Korea) Ko Sung-hyun / Kim Ha-na
6. (Indonesia) Riky Widianto / Puspita Richi Dili
7. (South Korea) Shin Baek-cheol / Jang Ye-na
8. (Denmark) Anders Kristiansen / Julie Houmann

=== Top half ===
First Round
1	(China) Xu C (China) Ma J
Q1	(China) Guo JJ (China) Luo JX	w	/	o
(Indonesia) L A Nugroho (Indonesia) A Saufika	8
(China) Liu C (China) Bao YX	14^{r}
5	(South Korea) Ko S-h (South Korea) Kim H-n	21	21
(Indonesia) I Fahhilah (Indonesia) W Anggraini	7	19
(South Korea) Yoo Y-s (South Korea) Eom H-w	21	20	21
PFQ	(South Korea) Lee Y-d (South Korea) Shin S-c	18	22	14
3	(Thailand) S Prapakamol (Thailand) S Thoungthongkam	w	/	o
(China) Liu YC (China) Huang DP
(Indonesia) P Jordan (Indonesia) V Marissa	15	21	21
Q3	(Japan) H Endo (Japan) A Takahashi	21	14	12
6	(Indonesia) R Widianto (Indonesia) P R Dili	20	21	21
(China) Shi LF (China) Peng D	22	12	9
(China) Zhang NY (China) Yu XH
(Japan) H Hashimoto (Japan) M Maeda	w	/	o

Second Round
Q1	(China) Guo JJ (China) Luo JX	19	15
(Indonesia) L A Nugroho (Indonesia) A Saufika	21	21
5	(South Korea) Ko S-h (South Korea) Kim H-n	13	24	15
(South Korea) Yoo Y-s (South Korea) Eom H-w	21	22	21
3	(Thailand) S Prapakamol (Thailand) S Thoungthongkam	15	23	11
(Indonesia) P Jordan (Indonesia) V Marissa	21	21	21
6	(Indonesia) R Widianto (Indonesia) P R Dili	21	21
(Japan) H Hashimoto (Japan) M Maeda	11	14

Quarterfinals
(Indonesia) L A Nugroho (Indonesia) A Saufika	12	9
(South Korea) Yoo Y-s (South Korea) Eom H-w	21	21
(Indonesia) P Jordan (Indonesia) V Marissa	21	14	20
6	(Indonesia) R Widianto (Indonesia) P R Dili	8	21	22

Semifinals
(South Korea) Yoo Y-s (South Korea) Eom H-w	23	21
6	(Indonesia) R Widianto (Indonesia) P R Dili	21	17

=== Bottom half ===
First Round
(South Korea) Kim K-j (South Korea) Kim S-y	20	21	16
Q4	(China) Luo C (China) Xiao J	22	13	21
(China) Wang YL (China) Huang YQ	22	12
7	(South Korea) Shin B-c (South Korea) Jang Y-n	24	21
Q2	(China) Ou XY (China) Liu LL	17	17
(United States) P Chew (United States) J Subandhi	21	21
(China) Chai B (China) Tang JH	20	20
4	(Indonesia) M Kido (Indonesia) P Z Bernadeth	22	22
(Singapore) D B Chrisnanta (Singapore) Y Y V Neo	22	18	21
(Indonesia) M F Gideon (Indonesia) R A Pradipta	20	21	15
(Singapore) T Hee (Singapore) Yao L	21	15	19
PFQ	(China) Kang J (China) Ou DN	16	21	21
(Singapore) Z J T Yeo (Singapore) S M Sari	19	15
(Thailand) N Puangpuapech (Thailand) P Supajirakul	21	21
(Japan) K Hayakawa (Japan) M Matsutomo	15	11
2	(China) Zhang N (China) Zhao YL	21	21

Second Round
Q4	(China) Luo C (China) Xiao J	12	16
7	(South Korea) Shin B-c (South Korea) Jang Y-n	21	21
(United States) P Chew (United States) J Subandhi	18	11
4	(Indonesia) M Kido (Indonesia) P Z Bernadeth	21	21
(Singapore) D B Chrisnanta (Singapore) Y Y V Neo	17	11^{r}
PFQ	(China) Kang J (China) Ou DN	21	17
(Thailand) N Puangpuapech (Thailand) P Supajirakul	12	13
2	(China) Zhang N (China) Zhao YL	21	21

Quarterfinals
7	(South Korea) Shin B-c (South Korea) Jang Y-n	15	19
4	(Indonesia) M Kido (Indonesia) P Z Bernadeth	21	21
PFQ	(China) Kang J (China) Ou DN
2	(China) Zhang N (China) Zhao YL	w	/	o

Semifinals
4	(Indonesia) M Kido (Indonesia) P Z Bernadeth	16	14
2	(China) Zhang N (China) Zhao YL	21	21

=== Finals ===
Semifinals
(South Korea) Yoo Yeon-seong (South Korea) Eom Hye-won	23	21
6	(Indonesia) Riky Widianto (Indonesia) Puspita Richi Dili	21	17
4	(Indonesia) Markis Kido (Indonesia) Pia Zebadiah Bernadeth	16	14
2	(China) Zhang Nan (China) Zhao Yunlei	21	21

Final
(South Korea) Yoo Yeon-seong (South Korea) Eom Hye-won	18	12
2	(China) Zhang Nan (China) Zhao Yunlei	21	21
