= 2014 BWF World Junior Championships – Girls doubles =

The Girls Doubles tournament of the 2014 BWF World Junior Championships was held on April 13–18. South Korean pair Chae Yoo-jung and Kim Ji-won won the last tournament but they could not defend their title due to the age eligibility.

Chen Qingchen who lost in the final last year won the title this year along with her new partner Jia Yifan. They beat Indonesian pair, Rosyita Eka Putri Sari and Apriani Rahayu 21-11, 21-14.

== Seeded ==
1. (China) Chen Qingchen / Jia Yifan (champion)
2. (Thailand) Pacharapun Chochuwong / Chanisa Teachavorasinskun (quarter-final)
3. (China) Du Yue / Li Yinhui (semi-final)
4. (Japan) Arisa Higashino / Wakana Nagahara (third round)
5. (Indonesia) Sinta Arum Antasari / Marsheilla Gischa Islami (second round)
6. (Russia) Vitalia Chigintseva / Elizaveta Pyatina (second round)
7. (China) Jiang Binbin / Tang Pingyang (semi-final)
8. (South Korea) Kim Hye-jeong / Kong Hee-yong (third round)
9. (Japan) Akane Araki / Chiharu Shida (quarter-final)
10. (England) Ira Banerjee / Jessica Pugh (third round)
11. (Singapore) Elaine Chua Yi Ling / Yeo Jiamin (first round)
12. (Denmark) Ditte Soby Hansen / Julie Dawall Jakobsen (first round)
13. (Germany) Luise Heim / Yvonne Li (third round)
14. (South Korea) Kim Ga-eun / Kim Hyang-im (first round)
15. (South Korea) Park Keun-hye / Yoon Min-ah (quarter-final)
16. (Indonesia) Rosyita Eka Putri Sari / Apriani Rahayu (final)

== Draw ==
=== Finals ===
Quarterfinals
1	(China) Chen Qingchen (China) Jia Yifan	21	21
(Thailand) Kilasu Ostermeyer (Thailand) Natcha Saengchote	13	16
3/4	(China) Du Yue (China) Li Yinhui	21	21
9/16	(Japan) Akane Araki (Japan) Chiharu Shida	18	11
5/8	(China) Jiang Binbin (China) Tang Pingyang	17	21	21
9/16	(South Korea) Park Keun-hye (South Korea) Yoon Min-ah	21	11	11
9/16	(Indonesia) Rosyita Eka Putri Sari (Indonesia) Apriani Rahayu	19	21	21
2	(Thailand) Pacharapun Chochuwong (Thailand) Chanisa Teachavorasinskun	21	14	13

Semifinals
1	(China) Chen Qingchen (China) Jia Yifan	21	21
3/4	(China) Du Yue (China) Li Yinhui	11	14
5/8	(China) Jiang Binbin (China) Tang Pingyang	13	16
9/16	(Indonesia) Rosyita Eka Putri Sari (Indonesia) Apriani Rahayu	21	21

Final
1	(China) Chen Qingchen (China) Jia Yifan	21	21
9/16	(Indonesia) Rosyita Eka Putri Sari (Indonesia) Apriani Rahayu	11	14

=== Top Half ===
==== Section 1 ====
First Round
1	(China) Chen QC (China) Jia YF
BYE
(Netherlands) A Chen (Netherlands) I van der Aar	19	4
(Japan) R Kawashima (Japan) S Ozaki	21	21
9/16	(England) I Banerjee (England) J Pugh	21	21
(Botswana) T Banewang (Botswana) T Kabelo	4	8
(Egypt) H Doha (Egypt) N Mohamed	7	7
(Singapore) Ong RN (Singapore) C Wong	21	21

Second Round
1	(China) Chen QC (China) Jia YF	21	21
(Japan) R Kawashima (Japan) S Ozaki	18	12
9/16	(England) I Banerjee (England) J Pugh	21	21
(Singapore) Ong RN (Singapore) C Wong	14	16

Third Round
1	(China) Chen QC (China) Jia YF	21	21
9/16	(England) I Banerjee (England) J Pugh	11	14

==== Section 2 ====
First Round
5/8	(Indonesia) S Antasari (Indonesia) M Islami
BYE
(Canada) J Chen (Canada) T Wang	17	21	14
(France) L Courtois (France) D Delrue	21	14	21
9/16	(Denmark) D Hansen (Denmark) J Jakobsen	12	21	10
(Thailand) K Ostermeyer (Thailand) N Saengchote	21	18	21
(Chinese Taipei) Chao P-c (Chinese Taipei) Chiang Y-t	21	21
(Slovenia) K Beton (Slovenia) E Cizelj	14	12

Second Round
5/8	(Indonesia) S Antasari (Indonesia) M Islami	18	17
(France) L Courtois (France) D Delrue	21	21
(Thailand) K Ostermeyer (Thailand) N Saengchote	14	21	21
(Chinese Taipei) Chao P-c (Chinese Taipei) Chiang Y-t	21	17	14

Third Round
(France) L Courtois (France) D Delrue	21	12	10
(Thailand) K Ostermeyer (Thailand) N Saengchote	18	21	21

==== Section 3 ====
First Round
3/4	(China) Du Y (China) Li YH
BYE
(Sri Lanka) M Beruwelage (Sri Lanka) Y Dayarathne	15	6
(Philippines) J De Vera (Philippines) T Pomar	21	21
9/16	(South Korea) Kim G-e (South Korea) Kim H-i	15	21	8
(Malaysia) Goh YC (Malaysia) Peck YW	21	17	21
(United States) V Chen (United States) C Pan	18	21	21
(Spain) C Azurmendi (Spain) I Fernandez	21	19	17

Second Round
3/4	(China) Du Y (China) Li YH	21	21
(Philippines) J De Vera (Philippines) T Pomar	7	13
(Malaysia) Goh YC (Malaysia) Peck YW	21	21
(United States) V Chen (United States) C Pan	17	11

Third Round
3/4	(China) Du Y (China) Li YH	21	21
(Malaysia) Goh YC (Malaysia) Peck YW	13	13

==== Section 4 ====
First Round
5/8	(Russia) V Chigintseva (Russia) E Pyatina
BYE
(Australia) Khoo LY (Australia) J Lai	6	22	8
(Chinese Taipei) Chang C-h (Chinese Taipei) Chang H-t	21	20	21
9/16	(Japan) A Araki (Japan) C Shida	21	21
(India) F Mather (India) K Sruthi	15	6
(Hong Kong) Huang WY (Hong Kong) Yeung NT	18	21	21
(Germany) E Janssens (Germany) J Petrikowski	21	10	18

Second Round
5/8	(Russia) V Chigintseva (Russia) E Pyatina	13	8
(Chinese Taipei) Chang C-h (Chinese Taipei) Chang H-t	21	21
9/16	(Japan) A Araki (Japan) C Shida	21	21
(Hong Kong) Huang WY (Hong Kong) Yeung NT	10	19

Third Round
(Chinese Taipei) Chang C-h (Chinese Taipei) Chang H-t	13	21	20
9/16	(Japan) A Araki (Japan) C Shida	21	14	22

=== Bottom Half ===
==== Section 5 ====
First Round
(Chinese Taipei) Pan T-c (Chinese Taipei) Tsai H-y	21	21
(Russia) A Davletova (Russia) A Ronzhina	14	13
(Indonesia) B Rumambi (Indonesia) J Sugiarto	25	14	21
9/16	(Singapore) E Chua (Singapore) Yeo JM	23	21	14
(United States) A Xu (United States) K Xu	21	21
(Macau) Kuan CL (Macau) Wong KI	7	11
BYE
5/8	(China) Jiang BB (China) Tang PY

Second Round
(Chinese Taipei) Pan T-c (Chinese Taipei) Tsai H-y	16	14
(Indonesia) B Rumambi (Indonesia) J Sugiarto	21	21
(United States) A Xu (United States) K Xu	15	10
5/8	(China) Jiang BB (China) Tang PY	21	21

Third Round
(Indonesia) B Rumambi (Indonesia) J Sugiarto	19	12
5/8	(China) Jiang BB (China) Tang PY	21	21

==== Section 6 ====
First Round
(Denmark) S Dahl (Denmark) S Lundgaard	21	21
(Uzbekistan) A Khurshudyan (Uzbekistan) M Pakina	10	12
(Malaysia) N Shah (Malaysia) Yap Z	12	17
9/16	(South Korea) Park K-h (South Korea) Yoon M-a	21	21
(Australia) J Tam (Australia) A Wu	16	8
(India) V Iyer (India) R Karthik	21	21
BYE
3/4	(Japan) A Higashino (Japan) W Nagahara

Second Round
(Denmark) S Dahl (Denmark) S Lundgaard	13	10
9/16	(South Korea) Park K-h (South Korea) Yoon M-a	21	21
(India) V Iyer (India) R Karthik	12	21
3/4	(Japan) A Higashino (Japan) W Nagahara	21	23

Third Round
9/16	(South Korea) Park K-h (South Korea) Yoon M-a	21	21
3/4	(Japan) A Higashino (Japan) W Nagahara	16	13

==== Section 7 ====
First Round
(Hong Kong) Fan KY (Hong Kong) Wu YT	21	21	19
(Malaysia) Eng PY (Malaysia) Tew JJ	13	23	21
(Armenia) K Margaryan (Armenia) L Poghosyan	3	2
9/16	(Indonesia) R Putri Sari (Indonesia) A Rahayu	21	21
(Sri Lanka) K Waduthantri (Sri Lanka) I Warangana	14	21	20
(Mexico) H Gaitan (Mexico) S Solis	21	15	22
BYE
5/8	(South Korea) Kim H-j (South Korea) Kong H-y

Second Round
(Malaysia) Eng PY (Malaysia) Tew JJ	15	12
9/16	(Indonesia) R Putri Sari (Indonesia) A Rahayu	21	21
(Mexico) H Gaitan (Mexico) S Solis	5	6
5/8	(South Korea) Kim H-j (South Korea) Kong H-y	21	21

Third Round
9/16	(Indonesia) R Putri Sari (Indonesia) A Rahayu	21	21
5/8	(South Korea) Kim H-j (South Korea) Kong H-y	18	16

==== Section 8 ====
First Round
(Zambia) M Chilambe (Zambia) E Siamupangila	7	6
(Philippines) J Francisco (Philippines) E Inlayo	21	21
(England) J Hopton (England) L Powell	18	12
9/16	(Germany) L Heim (Germany) Y Li	21	21
(South Africa) A Schoonees (South Africa) J van der Vyver	15	10
(Czech Republic) M Lajdova (Czech Republic) M Svetnickova	21	21
BYE
2	(Thailand) P Chochuwong (Thailand) C Teachavorasinskun

Second Round
(Philippines) J Francisco (Philippines) E Inlayo	21	13	18
9/16	(Germany) L Heim (Germany) Y Li	12	21	21
(Czech Republic) M Lajdova (Czech Republic) M Svetnickova	8	11
2	(Thailand) P Chochuwong (Thailand) C Teachavorasinskun	21	21

Third Round
9/16	(Germany) L Heim (Germany) Y Li	19	13
2	(Thailand) P Chochuwong (Thailand) C Teachavorasinskun	21	21
