= 2014 Asian Junior Badminton Championships – Girls doubles =

Tournament details
- Dates: 19 – 23 February 2014
- Edition: 17
- Venue: Taipei Gymnasium
- Location: Taipei, Taiwan

The girls' doubles tournament of the 2014 Asian Junior Badminton Championships was held from February 19–23 in Taipei, Taiwan. The defending champion of the last edition were the Chinese pair Huang Dongping and Jia Yifan. Jia teamed-up with last year finalist Chen Qingchen this time as the first seeded, and emerge as the champion after beat their compatriot, the third seeded Du Yue and Li Yinhui in the finals with the score 21–11, 21–18.

== Seeded ==
1. (China) Chen Qingchen / Jia Yifan (champion)
2. (Thailand) Pacharapun Chochuwong / Chanisa Teachavorasinskun (quarter-final)
3. (China) Du Yue / Li Yinhui (final)
4. (Chinese Taipei) Chang Ching-hui / Chang Hsin-tien (quarter-final)
5. (Japan) Arisa Higashino / Wakana Nagahara (third round)
6. (Malaysia) Goh Yea Ching / Peck Yen Wei (third round)
7. (Singapore) Elaine Chua Yi Ling / Yeo Jiamin (third round)
8. (Malaysia) Raja Nunina Raja Azlan Shah / Yap Zhen (third round)

== Draw ==
=== Finals ===
Quarterfinals
1	(China) Chen Qingchen (China) Jia Yifan	21	21
(Indonesia) Apriani Rahayu (Indonesia) Jauza Fadhila Sugiarto	7	12
4	(Chinese Taipei) Chang Ching-hui (Chinese Taipei) Chang Hsin-tien	11	21	16
(China) Jiang Binbin (China) Tang Pingyang	21	17	21
(Indonesia) Nisak Puji Lestari (Indonesia) Rika Rositawati	8	11
3	(China) Du Yue (China) Li Yinhui	21	21
(Japan) Rira Kawashima (Japan) Saori Ozaki	19	21	21
2	(Thailand) Pacharapun Chochuwong (Thailand) Chanisa Teachavorasinskun	21	18	11

Semifinals
1	(China) Chen Qingchen (China) Jia Yifan	21	21
(China) Jiang Binbin (China) Tang Pingyang	14	13
3	(China) Du Yue (China) Li Yinhui	21	17	21
(Japan) Rira Kawashima (Japan) Saori Ozaki	18	21	17

Final
1	(China) Chen Qingchen (China) Jia Yifan	21	21
3	(China) Du Yue (China) Li Yinhui	11	18

=== Top Half ===
==== Section 1 ====
First Round
1	(China) Chen QC (China) Jia YF
BYE
(Malaysia) Eng PY (Malaysia) Tew JJ
BYE
(Thailand) B Karnjanavadee (Thailand) R Iamratanamaetheekul
BYE
(Sri Lanka) Y Dayarathne (Sri Lanka) K Waduthantri
BYE

Second Round
1	(China) Chen QC (China) Jia YF	21	21
(Malaysia) Eng PY (Malaysia) Tew JJ	8	7
(Thailand) B Karnjanavadee (Thailand) R Iamratanamaetheekul	21	21
(Sri Lanka) Y Dayarathne (Sri Lanka) K Waduthantri	9	13

Third Round
1	(China) Chen QC (China) Jia YF	21	21
(Thailand) B Karnjanavadee (Thailand) R Iamratanamaetheekul	11	8

==== Section 2 ====
First Round
7	(Singapore) E Chua (Singapore) Yeo JM
BYE
(Hong Kong) Chan YK (Hong Kong) Chow KL
BYE
(Indonesia) A Rahayu (Indonesia) J Sugiarto
BYE
(Philippines) J Francisco (Philippines) E Inlayo	21	18	21
(India) V Iyer (India) R Karthik	17	21	17

Second Round
7	(Singapore) E Chua (Singapore) Yeo JM	21	21
(Hong Kong) Chan YK (Hong Kong) Chow KL	10	14
(Indonesia) A Rahayu (Indonesia) J Sugiarto	21	21
(Philippines) J Francisco (Philippines) E Inlayo	14	12

Third Round
7	(Singapore) E Chua (Singapore) Yeo JM	16	23	18
(Indonesia) A Rahayu (Indonesia) J Sugiarto	21	21	21

==== Section 3 ====
First Round
4	(Chinese Taipei) Chang C-h (Chinese Taipei) Chang H-t
BYE
(South Korea) Kim H-j (South Korea) Kong H-y
BYE
(Hong Kong) Ng TY (Hong Kong) Yeung SY
BYE
(Philippines) A Albo (Philippines) L Tercias
BYE

Second Round
4	(Chinese Taipei) Chang C-h (Chinese Taipei) Chang H-t	21	21
(South Korea) Kim H-j (South Korea) Kong H-y	19	19
(Hong Kong) Ng TY (Hong Kong) Yeung SY	21	21
(Philippines) A Albo (Philippines) L Tercias	10	14

Third Round
4	(Chinese Taipei) Chang C-h (Chinese Taipei) Chang H-t	21	21
(Hong Kong) Ng TY (Hong Kong) Yeung SY	9	10

==== Section 4 ====
First Round
6	(Malaysia) Goh YC (Malaysia) Peck YW
BYE
(Japan) A Araki (Japan) C Shida
BYE
(Chinese Taipei) Chao P-c (Chinese Taipei) Chiang Y-t
BYE
(Chinese Taipei) Pan T-c (Chinese Taipei) Tsai H-y	5	22
(China) Jiang BB (China) Tang PY	21	24

Second Round
6	(Malaysia) Goh YC (Malaysia) Peck YW	21	21
(Japan) A Araki (Japan) C Shida	19	19
(Chinese Taipei) Chao P-c (Chinese Taipei) Chiang Y-t	13	7
(China) Jiang BB (China) Tang PY	21	21

Third Round
6	(Malaysia) Goh YC (Malaysia) Peck YW	17	16
(China) Jiang BB (China) Tang PY	21	21

=== Bottom Half ===
==== Section 5 ====
First Round
(Macau) Gong XX (Macau) Wong KI	7	7
(Indonesia) N Lestari (Indonesia) R Rositawati	21	21
BYE
(Sri Lanka) B Galagamage (Sri Lanka) T Peiris
BYE
(Hong Kong) Fan KY (Hong Kong) Wu YT
BYE
8	(Malaysia) N Shah (Malaysia) Yap Z

Second Round
(Indonesia) N Lestari (Indonesia) R Rositawati	21	21
(Sri Lanka) B Galagamage (Sri Lanka) T Peiris	11	7
(Hong Kong) Fan KY (Hong Kong) Wu YT	21	17	18
8	(Malaysia) N Shah (Malaysia) Yap Z	14	21	21

Third Round
(Indonesia) N Lestari (Indonesia) R Rositawati	21	21
8	(Malaysia) N Shah (Malaysia) Yap Z	19	18

==== Section 6 ====
First Round
BYE
(India) F Mather (India) Sruthi K.P.
BYE
(South Korea) Kim G-e (South Korea) Kim H-i
BYE
(Singapore) Ong RN (Singapore) C Wong
BYE
3	(China) Du Y (China) Li YH

Second Round
(India) F Mather (India) Sruthi K.P.	7	17
(South Korea) Kim G-e (South Korea) Kim H-i	21	21
(Singapore) Ong RN (Singapore) C Wong	16	10
3	(China) Du Y (China) Li YH	21	21

Third Round
(South Korea) Kim G-e (South Korea) Kim H-i	19	16
3	(China) Du Y (China) Li YH	21	21

==== Section 7 ====
First Round
(Singapore) G Chua (Singapore) D Quek	6	6
(Japan) R Kawashima (Japan) S Ozaki	21	21
BYE
(Philippines) J De Vera (Philippines) A Leonardo
BYE
(Uzbekistan) A Khurshudyan (Uzbekistan) M Pakina
BYE
5	(Japan) A Higashino (Japan) W Nagahara

Second Round
(Japan) R Kawashima (Japan) S Ozaki	21	21
(Philippines) J De Vera (Philippines) A Leonardo	7	6
(Uzbekistan) A Khurshudyan (Uzbekistan) M Pakina	5	2
5	(Japan) A Higashino (Japan) W Nagahara	21	21

Third Round
(Japan) R Kawashima (Japan) S Ozaki	21	7	22
5	(Japan) A Higashino (Japan) W Nagahara	19	21	20

==== Section 8 ====
First Round
BYE
(Chinese Taipei) Chen X-t (Chinese Taipei) Lin X-m
BYE
(South Korea) Bang J-s (South Korea) Seong S-y
BYE
(Chinese Taipei) Chen W-t (Chinese Taipei) Wang Y-y
BYE
2	(Thailand) P Chochuwong (Thailand) C Teachavorasinskun

Second Round
(Chinese Taipei) Chen X-t (Chinese Taipei) Lin X-m	21	22
(South Korea) Bang J-s (South Korea) Seong S-y	19	20
(Chinese Taipei) Chen W-t (Chinese Taipei) Wang Y-y	22	16	12
2	(Thailand) P Chochuwong (Thailand) C Teachavorasinskun	20	21	21

Third Round
(Chinese Taipei) Chen X-t (Chinese Taipei) Lin X-m	13	13
2	(Thailand) P Chochuwong (Thailand) C Teachavorasinskun	21	21
