= 2017 Canada Open Grand Prix =

Tournament details
- Dates: 11 – 16 July 2017
- Level: Grand Prix
- Total prize money: US$65,000
- Venue: Markin MacPhail Centre
- Location: Calgary, Alberta, Canada

Champions
- Men's singles: (Japan) Kanta Tsuneyama
- Women's singles: (Japan) Saena Kawakami
- Men's doubles: (England) Peter Briggs (England) Tom Wolfenden
- Women's doubles: (Japan) Mayu Matsumoto (Japan) Wakana Nagahara
- Mixed doubles: (South Korea) Kim Won-ho (South Korea) Shin Seung-chan

The 2017 Canada Open Grand Prix, was the ninth Grand Prix's badminton tournament of the 2017 BWF Grand Prix Gold and Grand Prix. The tournament was held at the Markin MacPhail Centre in Calgary, Alberta, Canada on 11 – 16 July 2017 and had a total purse of $65,000.

== Men's singles ==
=== Seeds ===
1. (South Korea) Lee Hyun-il (semifinals)
2. (India) H. S. Prannoy (third round)
3. (India) Sameer Verma (withdrew)
4. (Malaysia) Zulfadli Zulkiffli (withdrew)
5. (Spain) Pablo Abián (quarterfinals)
6. (Japan) Kanta Tsuneyama (champion)
7. (Brazil) Ygor Coelho (quarterfinals)
8. (Japan) Kazumasa Sakai (first round)
9. (South Korea) Jeon Hyeok-jin (quarterfinals)
10. (Sweden) Henri Hurskainen (withdrew)
11. (France) Lucas Corvee (third round)
12. (Netherlands) Mark Caljouw (third round)
13. (Vietnam) Nguyen Tien Minh (first round)
14. (France) Lucas Claerbout (first round)
15. (Sri Lanka) Niluka Karunaratne (third round)
16. (India) Parupalli Kashyap (second round)

=== Finals ===
Quarterfinals
1	(South Korea) Lee Hyun-il	21	21
7	(Brazil) Ygor Coelho	9	9
(Japan) Koki Watanabe	11	17
6	(Japan) Kanta Tsuneyama	21	21
5	(Spain) Pablo Abián	12	11
(Japan) Kenta Nishimoto	21	21
Q4	(Japan) Kento Momota	21	21
9	(South Korea) Jeon Hyeok-jin	13	18

Semifinals
1	(South Korea) Lee Hyun-il	21	8	12
6	(Japan) Kanta Tsuneyama	17	21	21
(Japan) Kenta Nishimoto	11	13
Q4	(Japan) Kento Momota	21	21

Final
6	(Japan) Kanta Tsuneyama	22	14	21
Q4	(Japan) Kento Momota	20	21	14

=== Top half ===
==== Section 1 ====
First round
1	(South Korea) Lee H-i	21	21
(Japan) H Shimono	9	11
(India) L Sarang	21	17	21
Q6	(Canada) E Chan	9	21	7
11	(France) L Corvee	21	21
(India) H Dani	11	7
(Austria) L Wraber	21	16	14
PFQ	(Canada) G Huang	14	21	21

Second round
1	(South Korea) Lee H-i	21	21
(India) L Sarang	12	6
11	(France) L Corvee	21	16	21
PFQ	(Canada) G Huang	17	21	8

Third round
1	(South Korea) Lee H-i	22	21	21
11	(France) L Corvee	24	18	12

==== Section 2 ====
First round
7	(Brazil) Y Coelho	21	21
PFQ	(United States) S Pongnairat	11	19
(Hungary) G Krausz	21	21
(Peru) B B Deza	12	14
15	(Sri Lanka) N Karunaratne	21	21
Q3	(Canada) B Yang	17	11
(Canada) B. R. Sankeerth	21	21
(Vietnam) Le D P	14	17

Second round
7	(Brazil) Y Coelho	21	22
(Hungary) G Krausz	18	20
15	(Sri Lanka) N Karunaratne	21	21
(Canada) B. R. Sankeerth	18	16

Third round
7	(Brazil) Y Coelho	21	21
15	(Sri Lanka) N Karunaratne	15	17

==== Section 3 ====
First round
PFQ	(India) K R Rajarajan	13	21	21
(Croatia) Z Đurkinjak	21	10	13
PFQ	(Canada) K Lee	17	10
(England) S Parsons	21	21
16	(India) P Kashyap	21	21
(Peru) D L T Regal	11	9
(Mexico) A Hernández	12	9
(Japan) K Watanabe	21	21

Second round
PFQ	(India) K R Rajarajan	21	21
(England) S Parsons	16	14
16	(India) P Kashyap	10	21	15
(Japan) K Watanabe	21	10	21

Third round
PFQ	(India) K R Rajarajan	18	14
(Japan) K Watanabe	21	21

==== Section 4 ====
First round
6	(Japan) K Tsuneyama	21	21
(Canada) T Chiu	7	8
(Austria) R Gnedt	21	21
Q1	(Canada) I Su	12	18
13	(Vietnam) Nguyen T M	16	17
(Guatemala) K Cordón	21	21
(Republic of Ireland) S Evans	21	12	19
PFQ	(Canada) J B T Lai	8	21	21

Second round
6	(Japan) K Tsuneyama	w	/	o
(Austria) R Gnedt
(Guatemala) K Cordón	21	21
PFQ	(Canada) J B T Lai	17	11

Third round
6	(Japan) K Tsuneyama	21	21
(Guatemala) K Cordón	18	10

=== Bottom half ===
==== Section 5 ====
First round
(United States) H Shu	21	18	21
Q8	(Canada) I Wadia	10	21	7
(India) A Yelegar	21	21
PFQ	(Vietnam) Nguyen H N	15	5
(Peru) D Mini	15	9
(Sri Lanka) S Dias	21	21
(Austria) V Vattanirappel	16	11
5	(Spain) P Abián	21	21

Second round
(United States) H Shu	10	21	17
(India) A Yelegar	21	19	21
(Sri Lanka) S Dias	18	9
5	(Spain) P Abián	21	21

Third round
(India) A Yelegar	15	23	14
5	(Spain) P Abián	21	21	21

==== Section 6 ====
First round
(Republic of Ireland) J Magee	21	21
(Canada) L Couture	11	13
(Japan) K Nishimoto	21	13	21
14	(France) L Claerbout	14	21	16
(Vietnam) Pham C C	21	21
Q2	(Canada) J Akin-Mulrooney	12	12
(Trinidad and Tobago) N Bonkowsky	10	14
PFQ	(Sri Lanka) B Goonethilleka	21	21

Second round
(Republic of Ireland) J Magee	15	10
(Japan) K Nishimoto	21	21
(Vietnam) Pham C C	21	21
PFQ	(Sri Lanka) B Goonethilleka	16	15

Third round
(Japan) K Nishimoto	21	21
(Vietnam) Pham C C	14	9

==== Section 7 ====
First round
(Austria) W Gnedt	11	20
Q5	(Indonesia) R Perdana	21	22
(South Korea) Heo K-h	13	21	15
12	(Netherlands) M Caljouw	21	10	21
Q4	(Japan) K Momota	21	21
Q7	(Canada) B T Vo	13	13
(England) T Penty	16	21	21
8	(Japan) K Sakai	21	18	17

Second round
Q5	(Indonesia) R Perdana	13	9
12	(Netherlands) M Caljouw	21	21
Q4	(Japan) K Momota	21	21
(England) T Penty	10	9

Third round
12	(Netherlands) M Caljouw	17	18
Q4	(Japan) K Momota	21	21

==== Section 8 ====
First round
(Mexico) L Muñoz	21	21
(Peru) J Guevara	10	15
(Canada) Jason H-s	21	16	14
9	(South Korea) Jeon H-j	19	21	21
(Scotland) K Merrilees	21	21
(Brazil) F Farias	6	13
(Mexico) J Castillo	13	15
2	(India) H. S. Prannoy	21	21

Second round
(Mexico) L Muñoz	14	18
9	(South Korea) Jeon H-j	21	21
(Scotland) K Merrilees	17	21	15
2	(India) H. S. Prannoy	21	16	21

Third round
9	(South Korea) Jeon H-j	17	21	21
2	(India) H. S. Prannoy	21	14	13

== Women's singles ==
=== Seeds ===
1. (United States) Beiwen Zhang (second round)
2. (Japan) Aya Ohori (quarterfinals)
3. (Spain) Beatriz Corrales (second round)
4. (Bulgaria) Linda Zetchiri (first round)
5. (Denmark) Natalia Koch Rohde (second round)
6. (Vietnam) Vu Thi Trang (first round)
7. (South Korea) Lee Jang-mi (first round)
8. (Canada) Michelle Li (first round)

=== Finals ===
Semifinals
(Japan) Saena Kawakami	21	21
(Japan) Sayaka Takahashi	14	10
Q4	(South Korea) Jeon Joo-i	14	8
(Scotland) Kirsty Gilmour	21	21

Final
(Japan) Saena Kawakami	19	21	21
(Scotland) Kirsty Gilmour	21	19	18

=== Top half ===
==== Section 1 ====
First round
1	(United States) B Zhang	21	21
(South Korea) Kim N-y	14	19
(Japan) S Kawakami	21	21
(Netherlands) G Mahulette	12	11
8	(Canada) M Li	21	21	12
(Japan) Y Hashimoto	17	23	21
(Japan) H Suzuki	9	21	21
(India) R Das	21	18	16

Second round
1	(United States) B Zhang	21	22	11
(Japan) S Kawakami	16	24	21
(Japan) Y Hashimoto	13	14
(Japan) H Suzuki	21	21

Quarterfinals
(Japan) S Kawakami	21	15	21
(Japan) H Suzuki	18	21	14

==== Section 2 ====
First round
4	(Bulgaria) L Zetchiri	17	15
Q2	(Thailand) S Suwannakitborihan	21	21
Q1	(Canada) B Tam	21	21
(England) C Birch	13	10
6	(Vietnam) Vu T T	10	10
(Japan) S Takahashi	21	21
(Denmark) S H Dahl	21	21
(Hungary) A Korosi	11	16

Second round
Q2	(Thailand) S Suwannakitborihan	17	16
Q1	(Canada) B Tam	21	21
(Japan) S Takahashi	21	21
(Denmark) S H Dahl	11	18

Quarterfinals
Q1	(Canada) B Tam	12	14
(Japan) S Takahashi	21	21

=== Bottom half ===
==== Section 3 ====
First round
Q3	(Switzerland) R Stern	21	21
(India) R Karthik	11	7
(United States) J Subandhi	9	20
5	(Denmark) N K Rohde	21	22
(India) S K P Kudaravalli	9	13
Q4	(South Korea) Jeon J-i	21	21
(England) F Chapman	22	19	17
3	(Spain) B Corrales	20	21	21

Second round
Q3	(Switzerland) R Stern	21	22	21
5	(Denmark) N K Rohde	11	24	18
Q4	(South Korea) Jeon J-i	21	21
3	(Spain) B Corrales	14	13

Quarterfinals
Q3	(Switzerland) R Stern	9	14
Q4	(South Korea) Jeon J-i	21	21

==== Section 4 ====
First round
(India) S U R Chukka	21	4
(Canada) R Honderich	23	21
(Scotland) K Gilmour	21	21
7	(South Korea) Lee J-m	19	10
(South Korea) Kim G-e	21	19	13
(India) R S Gadde	6	21	21
(Australia) T Ho	6	9
2	(Japan) A Ohori	21	21

Second round
(Canada) R Honderich	18	17
(Scotland) K Gilmour	21	21
(India) R S Gadde	13	21	19
2	(Japan) A Ohori	21	17	21

Quarterfinals
(Scotland) K Gilmour	21	21
2	(Japan) A Ohori	14	15

== Men's doubles ==
=== Seeds ===
1. (Chinese Taipei) Lu Ching-yao / Yang Po-han (semifinals)
2. (Japan) Takuto Inoue / Yuki Kaneko (quarterfinals)
3. (India) Manu Attri / B. Sumeeth Reddy (quarterfinals)
4. (Sweden) Richard Eidestedt / Nico Ruponen (second round)
5. (Australia) Matthew Chau / Sawan Serasinghe (first round)
6. (Japan) Hiroki Okamura / Masayuki Onodera (first round)
7. (Republic of Ireland) Joshua Magee / Sam Magee (first round)
8. (England) Peter Briggs / Tom Wolfenden (champion)

=== Finals ===
Semifinals
1	(Chinese Taipei) Lu Ching-yao (Chinese Taipei) Yang Po-han	13	20
Q1	(South Korea) Kim Won-ho (South Korea) Seo Seung-jae	21	22
Q2	(South Korea) Choi Hyuk-gyun (South Korea) Park Kyung-hoon	21	17	18
8	(England) Peter Briggs (England) Tom Wolfenden	17	21	21

Final
Q1	(South Korea) Kim Won-ho (South Korea) Seo Seung-jae	20	21	19
8	(England) Peter Briggs (England) Tom Wolfenden	22	16	21

=== Top half ===
==== Section 1 ====
First round
1	(Chinese Taipei) Lu C-y (Chinese Taipei) Yang P-h	21	21
(Vietnam) Do T D (Vietnam) Pham H N	16	11
(Sri Lanka) S Dias (Sri Lanka) B Goonethilleka	18	21	15
(Canada) A J Bauer (Canada) T A Lindeman	21	14	21
6	(Japan) H Okamura (Japan) M Onodera	16	24
(Netherlands) J Maas (Netherlands) R Tabeling	21	26
(Scotland) M Campbell (Scotland) P MacHugh	21	21
(Trinidad and Tobago) N Bonkowsky (United States) M Fogarty	6	6

Second round
1	(Chinese Taipei) Lu C-y (Chinese Taipei) Yang P-h	21	21
(Canada) A J Bauer (Canada) T A Lindeman	13	12
(Netherlands) J Maas (Netherlands) R Tabeling	21	21
(Scotland) M Campbell (Scotland) P MacHugh	17	18

Quarterfinals
1	(Chinese Taipei) Lu C-y (Chinese Taipei) Yang P-h	21	20	21
(Netherlands) J Maas (Netherlands) R Tabeling	11	22	17

==== Section 2 ====
First round
3	(India) M Attri (India) B. S Reddy	21	21
(Japan) K Gondo (Japan) T Watanabe	15	19
PFQ	(Canada) J B T Lai (Canada) K Lee	11	12
(South Korea) Choi S-g (South Korea) Kim J-h	21	21
5	(Australia) M Chau (Australia) S Serasinghe	6	16
Q1	(South Korea) Kim W-h (South Korea) Seo S-j	21	21
(England) B Lane (England) S Vendy	21	17	21
Q4	(Indonesia) P E Rhoma (Canada) B Yang	14	21	17

Second round
3	(India) M Attri (India) B. S Reddy	21	17	21
(South Korea) Choi S-g (South Korea) Kim J-h	17	21	13
Q1	(South Korea) Kim W-h (South Korea) Seo S-j	22	22
(England) B Lane (England) S Vendy	20	17

Quarterfinals
3	(India) M Attri (India) B. S Reddy	12	15
Q1	(South Korea) Kim W-h (South Korea) Seo S-j	21	21

=== Bottom half ===
==== Section 3 ====
First round
(Vietnam) Bao M (Vietnam) Duong B D	12	26	21
Q3	(Mexico) J Castillo (Mexico) L Munoz	21	24	15
(Netherlands) J Arends (Netherlands) R Jille	23	21
7	(Republic of Ireland) J Magee (Republic of Ireland) S Magee	21	9
Q2	(South Korea) Choi H-g (South Korea) Park K-h	21	21
(France) J Corvée (France) R Labar	13	11
(Canada) B. R. Sankeerth (Indonesia) R Perdana	16	12
4	(Sweden) R Eidestedt (Sweden) N Ruponen	21	21

Second round
(Vietnam) Bao M (Vietnam) Duong B D	12	12
(Netherlands) J Arends (Netherlands) R Jille	21	21
Q2	(South Korea) Choi H-g (South Korea) Park K-h	19	21	21
4	(Sweden) R Eidestedt (Sweden) N Ruponen	21	14	8

Quarterfinals
(Netherlands) J Arends (Netherlands) R Jille	21	18	14
Q2	(South Korea) Choi H-g (South Korea) Park K-h	15	21	21

==== Section 4 ====
First round
(Germany) D Benz (Germany) A Heinz	11	21	21
(India) A Francis (India) T Kona	21	17	8
(Canada) Jason H-s (Canada) N Yakura	21	17	15
8	(England) P Briggs (England) T Wolfenden	14	21	21
(Peru) J Guevara (Peru) D L T Regal	16	14
(Austria) D Stipsits (Austria) R Zirnwald	21	21
(Scotland) A Dunn (Scotland) A Hall	15	17
2	(Japan) T Inoue (Japan) Y Kaneko	21	21

Second round
(Germany) D Benz (Germany) A Heinz	18	21	17
8	(England) P Briggs (England) T Wolfenden	21	16	21
(Austria) D Stipsits (Austria) R Zirnwald	7	18
2	(Japan) T Inoue (Japan) Y Kaneko	21	21

Quarterfinals
8	(England) P Briggs (England) T Wolfenden	8	21	21
2	(Japan) T Inoue (Japan) Y Kaneko	21	16	15

== Women's doubles ==
=== Seeds ===
1. (Bulgaria) Gabriela Stoeva / Stefani Stoeva (second round)
2. (Australia) Setyana Mapasa / Gronya Somerville (withdrew)
3. (Russia) Anastasia Chervyakova / Olga Morozova (quarterfinals)
4. (South Korea) Kim Hye-rin / Yoo Hae-won (quarterfinals)
5. (South Korea) Chae Yoo-jung / Kim So-yeong (semifinals)
6. (Japan) Mayu Matsumoto / Wakana Nagahara (champion)
7. (Netherlands) Eefje Muskens / Selena Piek (withdrew)
8. (India) Meghana Jakkampudi / Poorvisha S Ram (first round)

=== Finals ===
Semifinals
6	(Japan) Mayu Matsumoto (Japan) Wakana Nagahara	21	12	24
(Japan) Misato Aratama (Japan) Akane Watanabe	15	21	22
5	(South Korea) Chae Yoo-jung (South Korea) Kim So-yeong	15	19
(Japan) Chisato Hoshi (Japan) Naru Shinoya	21	21

Final
6	(Japan) Mayu Matsumoto (Japan) Wakana Nagahara	21	16	21
(Japan) Chisato Hoshi (Japan) Naru Shinoya	16	21	18

=== Top half ===
==== Section 1 ====
First round
1	(Bulgaria) G Stoeva (Bulgaria) S Stoeva	21	21
(India) K Garg (India) N B Hazarika	7	3
Q4	(Canada) B Tam (Canada) K Tsai	12	18
(Japan) R Kawashima (Japan) S Ozaki	21	21
6	(Japan) M Matsumoto (Japan) W Nagahara	21	21
Q2	(Canada) R Honderich (Canada) M Li	14	7
(Sweden) C Nistad (Sweden) E Wengberg	21	21
Q3	(Canada) J Chen (Canada) K Shi	15	19

Second round
1	(Bulgaria) G Stoeva (Bulgaria) S Stoeva	16	15
(Japan) R Kawashima (Japan) S Ozaki	21	21
6	(Japan) M Matsumoto (Japan) W Nagahara	w	/	o
(Sweden) C Nistad (Sweden) E Wengberg

Quarterfinals
(Japan) R Kawashima (Japan) S Ozaki	12	12
6	(Japan) M Matsumoto (Japan) W Nagahara	21	21

==== Section 2 ====
First round
4	(South Korea) Kim H-r (South Korea) Yoo H-w	21	21
(Peru) I Castillo (Peru) P L T Regal	4	5
(France) L Baumann (France) A Fontaine	21	17	21
(Australia) L Choo (Australia) T Ho	17	21	15
PFQ	(Switzerland) C Burkart (Netherlands) J Meulendijks	16	21	19
(Thailand) S Suwannakitborihan (Thailand) C Teachavorasinskun	21	16	21
(England) L Smith (England) S Walker	16	16
(Japan) M Aratama (Japan) A Watanabe	21	21

Second round
4	(South Korea) Kim H-r (South Korea) Yoo H-w	21	21
(France) L Baumann (France) A Fontaine	10	11
(Thailand) S Suwannakitborihan (Thailand) C Teachavorasinskun	13	15
(Japan) M Aratama (Japan) A Watanabe	21	21

Quarterfinals
4	(South Korea) Kim H-r (South Korea) Yoo H-w	11	21	22
(Japan) M Aratama (Japan) A Watanabe	21	19	24

=== Bottom half ===
==== Section 3 ====
First round
(France) E Lefel (France) A Tran	21	21
Q1	(United States) G Gunawan (United States) N J Leung	11	9
(Japan) M Kashihara (Japan) M Kato	17	17
5	(South Korea) Chae Y-j (South Korea) Kim S-y	21	21
(Canada) M Tong (Canada) J Wu	8	21	17
(England) C Birch (England) J Pugh	21	19	21
(Netherlands) C Seinen (Netherlands) I Van Der Aar	24	21	12
3	(Russia) A Chervyakova (Russia) O Morozova	26	17	21

Second round
(France) E Lefel (France) A Tran	14	17
5	(South Korea) Chae Y-j (South Korea) Kim S-y	21	21
(England) C Birch (England) J Pugh	12	10
3	(Russia) A Chervyakova (Russia) O Morozova	21	21

Quarterfinals
5	(South Korea) Chae Y-j (South Korea) Kim S-y	21	21
3	(Russia) A Chervyakova (Russia) O Morozova	16	14

==== Section 4 ====
First round
(Brazil) J Lima (Brazil) S Lima	9	14
(Vietnam) Nguyen T S (Vietnam) Vu T T	21	21
(Japan) A Higashino (Japan) K Nakanishi	21	21
8	(India) M Jakkampudi (India) P. S Ram	12	6
(Scotland) J MacPherson (Scotland) E O'Donnell	16	21	12
(Japan) C Hoshi (Japan) N Shinoya	21	14	21
(Peru) D Macías (Peru) D Nishimura	8	11
PFQ	(South Korea) Lee S-h (South Korea) Shin S-c	21	21

Second round
(Vietnam) Nguyen T S (Vietnam) Vu T T	21	15	11
(Japan) A Higashino (Japan) K Nakanishi	19	21	21
(Japan) C Hoshi (Japan) N Shinoya	22	21
PFQ	(South Korea) Lee S-h (South Korea) Shin S-c	20	17

Quarterfinals
(Japan) A Higashino (Japan) K Nakanishi	21	19	16
(Japan) C Hoshi (Japan) N Shinoya	19	21	21

== Mixed doubles ==
=== Seeds ===
1. (South Korea) Choi Sol-gyu / Chae Yoo-jung (final)
2. (India) Pranaav Jerry Chopra / N. Sikki Reddy (quarterfinals)
3. (Sweden) Nico Ruponen / Amanda Hogstrom (quarterfinals)
4. (Republic of Ireland) Sam Magee / Chloe Magee (second round)
5. (France) Ronan Labar / Audrey Fontaine (second round)
6. (Australia) Sawan Serasinghe / Setyana Mapasa (second round)
7. (Netherlands) Jacco Arends / Selena Piek (quarterfinals)
8. (Canada) Nyl Yakura / Brittney Tam (first round)

=== Finals ===
Semifinals
1	(South Korea) Choi Sol-gyu (South Korea) Chae Yoo-jung	21	16	21
(South Korea) Seo Seung-jae (South Korea) Kim Ha-na	14	21	18
Q2	(Japan) Kohei Gondo (Japan) Wakana Nagahara	21	10	10
(South Korea) Kim Won-ho (South Korea) Shin Seung-chan	15	21	21

Final
1	(South Korea) Choi Sol-gyu (South Korea) Chae Yoo-jung	19	16
(South Korea) Kim Won-ho (South Korea) Shin Seung-chan	21	21

=== Top half ===
==== Section 1 ====
First round
1	(South Korea) Choi S-g (South Korea) Chae Y-j	18	21	21
(Netherlands) J Maas (Netherlands) I Van der Aar	21	10	13
PFQ	(Peru) B B Deza (Peru) I Castillo	13	7
(Canada) A Dong (Canada) O Lei	21	21
7	(Netherlands) J Arends (Netherlands) S Piek	21	21
(Australia) M Chau (Australia) L Choo	13	9
(Canada) T Ng (Canada) R Honderich	15	21	21
Q1	(Scotland) A Dunn (Scotland) E O'Donnell	21	18	15

Second round
1	(South Korea) Choi S-g (South Korea) Chae Y-j	14	21	21
(Canada) A Dong (Canada) O Lei	21	14	13
7	(Netherlands) J Arends (Netherlands) S Piek	21	21
(Canada) T Ng (Canada) R Honderich	15	16

Quarterfinals
1	(South Korea) Choi S-g (South Korea) Chae Y-j	21	16	21
7	(Netherlands) J Arends (Netherlands) S Piek	15	21	10

==== Section 2 ====
First round
3	(Sweden) N Ruponen (Sweden) A Hogstrom	21	21
PFQ	(Brazil) F Farias (Brazil) S Lima	11	17
(England) B Lane (England) J Pugh	21	21
(Vietnam) Pham H N (Vietnam) Le T H	12	18
5	(France) R Labar (France) A Fontaine	19	21	21
(Germany) A Heinz (Germany) A Horbach	21	12	14
(South Korea) Seo S-j (South Korea) Kim H-n	21	18	21
Q3	(Sweden) R Eidestedt (Sweden) C Nistad	17	21	17

Second round
3	(Sweden) N Ruponen (Sweden) A Hogstrom	21	22
(England) B Lane (England) J Pugh	15	20
5	(France) R Labar (France) A Fontaine	21	19	15
(South Korea) Seo S-j (South Korea) Kim H-n	13	21	21

Quarterfinals
3	(Sweden) N Ruponen (Sweden) A Hogstrom	12	15
(South Korea) Seo S-j (South Korea) Kim H-n	21	21

=== Bottom half ===
==== Section 3 ====
First round
Q2	(Japan) K Gondo (Japan) W Nagahara	21	21
(Trinidad and Tobago) N Bonkowsky (United States) Y Kawasaki	6	5
(India) T Kona (India) M Jakkampudi	21	22
8	(Canada) N Yakura (Canada) B Tam	13	20
(Vietnam) Do T D (Vietnam) Pham N T	21	21
(Peru) D Mini (Peru) P L T Regal	13	14
(France) J Corvee (France) A Tran	14	20
4	(Republic of Ireland) S Magee (Republic of Ireland) C Magee	21	22

Second round
Q2	(Japan) K Gondo (Japan) W Nagahara	21	21
(India) T Kona (India) M Jakkampudi	9	8
(Vietnam) Do T D (Vietnam) Pham N T	22	18	21
4	(Republic of Ireland) S Magee (Republic of Ireland) C Magee	20	21	17

Quarterfinals
Q2	(Japan) K Gondo (Japan) W Nagahara	21	21
(Vietnam) Do T D (Vietnam) Pham N T	17	18

==== Section 4 ====
First round
(South Korea) Kim W-h (South Korea) Shin S-c	21	21
Q4	(Croatia) Z Durkinjak (United States) B Zhang	17	18
(Switzerland) O Schaller (Switzerland) C Burkart	18	10
6	(Australia) S Serasinghe (Australia) S Mapasa	21	21
(Netherlands) R Tabeling (Netherlands) C Seinen	11	21	21
(South Korea) Kim J-h (South Korea) Lee S-h	21	18	13
(Peru) D L T Regal (Peru) D Nishimura	10	19
2	(India) P. J Chopra (India) N. S Reddy	21	21

Second round
(South Korea) Kim W-h (South Korea) Shin S-c	21	21
6	(Australia) S Serasinghe (Australia) S Mapasa	18	12
(Netherlands) R Tabeling (Netherlands) C Seinen	11	17
2	(India) P. J Chopra (India) N. S Reddy	21	21

Quarterfinals
(South Korea) Kim W-h (South Korea) Shin S-c	21	20	21
2	(India) P. J Chopra (India) N. S Reddy	17	22	18

Preceded by 2017 Chinese Taipei Open Grand Prix Gold	BWF Grand Prix Gold and Grand Prix; 2017 BWF Season	Succeeded by 2017 Russia Open Grand Prix
