= 2014 BWF World Junior Championships =

Tournament details
- Dates: April 7, 2014 - April 18, 2014
- Edition: 16th
- Level: International
- Venue: Stadium Sultan Abdul Halim
- Location: Alor Setar, Kedah, Malaysia

The 2014 BWF World Junior Championships were held in Alor Setar, Malaysia April 7–18, 2014.

== Medalists ==
Event	Gold	Silver	Bronze
Teams	China; He Jiting; Huang Kaixiang; Lin Guipu; Shi Yuqi; Xu Linhan; Yao Zhidi; Ye Binghong; Zhao Jian; Zhao Junpeng; Zheng Siwei; Chen Qingchen; Chen Xiaoxin; Chen Yufei; Du Yue; He Bingjiao; Jia Yifan; Jiang Binbin; Li Yinhui; Qin Jinjing; Tang Pingyang	Indonesia; Althof Baariq; Anthony Sinisuka Ginting; Clinton Hendrik Kudamasa; Firman Abdul Kholik; Gea Kamahamas Prima Putra; Jonatan Christie; Muhammad Bayu Pangisthu; Muhammad Rian Ardianto; Rafiddias Akhdan Nugroho; Reinard Dhanriano; Fitriani; Apriani Rahayu; Gregoria Mariska Tunjung; Jauza Fadhila Sugiarto; Marsheilla Gischa Islami; Nisak Puji Lestari; Rosyita Eka Putri Sari; Ruselli Hartawan; Sinta Arum; Zakia Ulfa	Japan; Hashiru Shimono; Kanta Tsuneyama; Katsuki Tamate; Kazuki Kirita; Kenya Mitsuhashi; Masahide Nakata; Minoru Koga; Yuta Watanabe; Akane Araki; Akane Yamaguchi; Arisa Higashino; Aya Ohori; Chiharu Shida; Natsuki Nidaira; Rira Kawashima; Saori Ozaki; Wakana Nagahara
Teams	China; He Jiting; Huang Kaixiang; Lin Guipu; Shi Yuqi; Xu Linhan; Yao Zhidi; Ye Binghong; Zhao Jian; Zhao Junpeng; Zheng Siwei; Chen Qingchen; Chen Xiaoxin; Chen Yufei; Du Yue; He Bingjiao; Jia Yifan; Jiang Binbin; Li Yinhui; Qin Jinjing; Tang Pingyang	Indonesia; Althof Baariq; Anthony Sinisuka Ginting; Clinton Hendrik Kudamasa; Firman Abdul Kholik; Gea Kamahamas Prima Putra; Jonatan Christie; Muhammad Bayu Pangisthu; Muhammad Rian Ardianto; Rafiddias Akhdan Nugroho; Reinard Dhanriano; Fitriani; Apriani Rahayu; Gregoria Mariska Tunjung; Jauza Fadhila Sugiarto; Marsheilla Gischa Islami; Nisak Puji Lestari; Rosyita Eka Putri Sari; Ruselli Hartawan; Sinta Arum; Zakia Ulfa	Thailand; Adulrach Namkul; Arkornnit Thaptimdong; Dechapol Puavaranukroh; Kantaphon Wangcharoen; Kantawat Leelavechabutr; Kittinupong Kedren; Mek Narongrit; Sirawit Suharitdumrong; Supak Jomkoh; Tanupat Viriyangkura; Alisa Sapniti; Busanan Ongbumrungpan; Chanisa Teachavorasinskun; Kilasu Ostermeyer; Narissapat Lam; Natcha Saengchote; Pacharapun Chochuwong; Pornpawee Chochuwong; Puttita Supajirakul; Thamolwan Poopradubsil
Boys singles	(China) Lin Guipu	(China) Shi Yuqi	(Indonesia) Anthony Ginting
Boys singles	(China) Lin Guipu	(China) Shi Yuqi	(China) Zhao Junpeng
Girls singles	(Japan) Akane Yamaguchi	(China) He Bingjiao	(Japan) Aya Ohori
Girls singles	(Japan) Akane Yamaguchi	(China) He Bingjiao	(China) Qin Jinjing
Boys doubles	(Thailand) Kittinupong Kedren (Thailand) Dechapol Puavaranukroh	(Japan) Masahide Nakata (Japan) Katsuki Tamate	(Indonesia) Muhammad Rian Ardianto (Indonesia) Clinton Hendrik Kudamassa
Boys doubles	(Thailand) Kittinupong Kedren (Thailand) Dechapol Puavaranukroh	(Japan) Masahide Nakata (Japan) Katsuki Tamate	(South Korea) Kim Jae-hwan (South Korea) Kim Jung-ho
Girls doubles	(China) Chen Qingchen (China) Jia Yifan	(Indonesia) Rosyita Eka Putri Sari (Indonesia) Apriani Rahayu	(China) Du Yue (China) Li Yinhui
Girls doubles	(China) Chen Qingchen (China) Jia Yifan	(Indonesia) Rosyita Eka Putri Sari (Indonesia) Apriani Rahayu	(China) Jiang Binbin (China) Tang Pingyang
Mixed doubles	(China) Huang Kaixiang (China) Chen Qingchen	(Indonesia) Muhammad Rian Ardianto (Indonesia) Rosyita Eka Putri Sari	(South Korea) Park Kyung-hoon (South Korea) Park Keun-hye
Mixed doubles	(China) Huang Kaixiang (China) Chen Qingchen	(Indonesia) Muhammad Rian Ardianto (Indonesia) Rosyita Eka Putri Sari	(Japan) Yuta Watanabe (Japan) Arisa Higashino

== Medal table ==
Rank	Nation	Gold	Silver	Bronze	Total
1	China (CHN)	4	2	4	10
2	Japan (JPN)	1	1	3	5
3	Thailand (THA)	1	0	1	2
4	Indonesia (INA)	0	3	2	5
5	South Korea (KOR)	0	0	2	2
Totals (5 entries)		6	6	12	24
