= Saena Kawakami =

Japanese badminton player (born 1997)

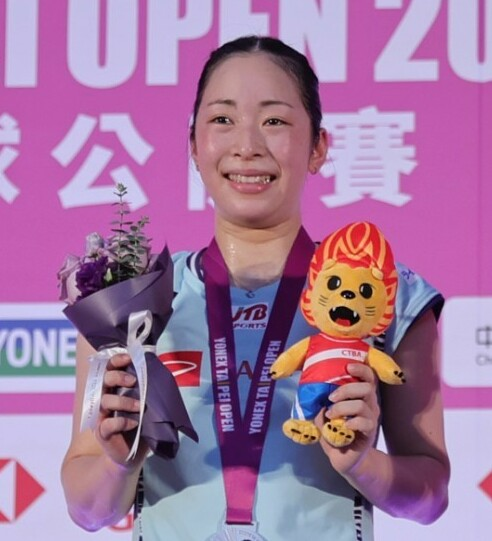
- Kawakami at the 2022 Taipei Open

Personal information
- Born: 5 December 1997 (age 28) Shimane Prefecture, Japan
- Height: 1.60 m (5 ft 3 in)
- Weight: 50 kg (110 lb)

Sport
- Country: Japan (2014–2024); Australia (since 2025)
- Sport: Badminton
- Handedness: Right
- Coached by: Kaori Imabeppu

Women's singles
- Career record: 136 wins, 79 losses
- Highest ranking: 15 (19 April 2018)
- BWF profile
Medal record
Women's badminton
Representing Japan
Sudirman Cup
Bronze medal – third place	2023 Suzhou	Mixed team
Uber Cup
Bronze medal – third place	2022 Bangkok	Women's team
Asian Games
Bronze medal – third place	2022 Hangzhou	Women's team
Asian Junior Championships
Bronze medal – third place	2015 Bangkok	Mixed team

Saena Kawakami (川上 紗惠奈, Kawakami Saena; born 5 December 1997) is a Japanese-born Australian badminton player.

== Awards and nominations ==
Award	Year	Category	Result	Ref.
BWF Awards	2015	Eddy Choong Most Promising Player of the Year	Nominated	

== Achievements ==
=== BWF World Tour (1 title, 2 runners-up) ===
The BWF World Tour, which was announced on 19 March 2017 and implemented in 2018, is a series of elite badminton tournaments sanctioned by the Badminton World Federation (BWF). The BWF World Tour is divided into levels of World Tour Finals, Super 1000, Super 750, Super 500, Super 300 (part of the HSBC World Tour), and the BWF Tour Super 100.

Women's singles
Year	Tournament	Level	Opponent	Score	Result
2019	Swiss Open	Super 300	(China) Chen Yufei	9–21, 16–21	(silver) Runner-up
2019	Orléans Masters	Super 100	(Scotland) Kirsty Gilmour	21–8, 18–21, 21–16	(gold) Winner
2022	Taipei Open	Super 300	(Chinese Taipei) Tai Tzu-ying	17–21, 16–21	(silver) Runner-up

=== BWF Grand Prix (4 titles, 4 runners-up) ===
The BWF Grand Prix had two levels, the Grand Prix and Grand Prix Gold. It was a series of badminton tournaments sanctioned by the Badminton World Federation (BWF) and played between 2007 and 2017.

Women's singles
Year	Tournament	Opponent	Score	Result	Ref.
2015	New Zealand Open	(China) He Bingjiao	21–16, 21–18	(gold) Winner	
2015	Vietnam Open	(Indonesia) Fitriani	26–24, 18–21, 21–10	(gold) Winner	
2016	U.S. Open	(Japan) Ayumi Mine	21–16, 11–21, 15–21	(silver) Runner-up	
2016	Chinese Taipei Masters	(Japan) Ayumi Mine	10–12, 11–7, 9–11, 10–12	(silver) Runner-up	
2017	China Masters	(Japan) Aya Ohori	9–21, 21–9, 18–21	(silver) Runner-up	
2017	Chinese Taipei Open	(Malaysia) Goh Jin Wei	21–17, 21–17	(gold) Winner	
2017	Canada Open	(Scotland) Kirsty Gilmour	19–21, 21–19, 21–18	(gold) Winner	
2017	New Zealand Open	(Thailand) Ratchanok Intanon	14–21, 21–16, 15–21	(silver) Runner-up	

BWF Grand Prix Gold tournament
BWF Grand Prix tournament

=== BWF International Challenge/Series (1 title, 1 runner-up) ===
Women's singles
Year	Tournament	Opponent	Score	Result	Ref.
2016	Vietnam International	(Vietnam) Vũ Thị Trang	21–19, 19–21, 13–21	(silver) Runner-up	
2019	Osaka International	(South Korea) Lee Se-yeon	21–14, 21–10	(gold) Winner	

BWF International Challenge tournament
