= 2014 Asian Junior Badminton Championships =

2014 Badminton Asia Junior Championships
Tournament details
- Dates: 16–23 February 2014
- Edition: 17
- Venue: Taipei Gymnasium
- Location: Taipei, Taiwan

The 2014 Badminton Asia Junior Championships is an Asia continental junior championships to crown the best U-19 badminton players across Asia. It was held in Taipei, Taiwan from February 16 to February 23, 2014. This is the second time for this event has been held in Taipei after being hosted by the city in 2001. This year, over 250 top badminton players from more than 20 countries participated in the competition.

== Tournament ==
The 2014 Badminton Asia Junior Championships organized by the Chinese Taipei Badminton Association and Badminton Asia Confederation. This tournament consists of mixed team competition, which was held from 16 – 19 February, as well as the five individual events started from 19–23 February.

=== Venue ===
This tournament was held at Taipei Gymnasium.

== Medalists ==
In the mixed team event, China defended their title by sweeping South Korea 3–0 in the final. Japan and Chinese Taipei team finished in the semi-finals. In the individuals event, China secured four titles, by winning the boys' singles, boys' doubles, girls' doubles and mixed doubles. The girls' singles title goes to Japanese player.

Event	Gold	Silver	Bronze
Teams	China; Lin Guipu; Zhao Jian; He Jiting; Zhao Junpeng; Huang Kaixiang; Xu Linhan; Zheng Siwei; Shi Yuqi; He Bingjiao; Qin Jinjing; Tang Pingyang; Chen Qingchen; Jia Yifan; Li Yinhui; Du Yue; Chen Yufei	South Korea; Kim Hui-tae; Kang Hyung-seok; Kim Jae-hwan; Choi Jong-woo; Lee Jun-su; Kim Jung-ho; Park Kyung-hoon; Seo Seung-jae; Ki Bo-hyun; Kim Ga-eun; Kong Hee-yong; Kim Hyang-im; Kim Hye-jeong; Bang Ji-sun; Yoon Min-ah; Seong Seung-yeon	Japan; Hashiru Shimono; Kanta Tsuneyama; Katsuki Tamate; Kazuki Kirita; Kenya Mitsuhashi; Masahide Nakata; Minoru Koga; Yuta Watanabe; Akane Araki; Akane Yamaguchi; Arisa Higashino; Aya Ohori; Chiharu Shida; Rira Kawashima; Saori Ozaki; Wakana Nagahara
Teams	China; Lin Guipu; Zhao Jian; He Jiting; Zhao Junpeng; Huang Kaixiang; Xu Linhan; Zheng Siwei; Shi Yuqi; He Bingjiao; Qin Jinjing; Tang Pingyang; Chen Qingchen; Jia Yifan; Li Yinhui; Du Yue; Chen Yufei	South Korea; Kim Hui-tae; Kang Hyung-seok; Kim Jae-hwan; Choi Jong-woo; Lee Jun-su; Kim Jung-ho; Park Kyung-hoon; Seo Seung-jae; Ki Bo-hyun; Kim Ga-eun; Kong Hee-yong; Kim Hyang-im; Kim Hye-jeong; Bang Ji-sun; Yoon Min-ah; Seong Seung-yeon	Chinese Taipei; Lee Chia-han; Lu Chia-hung; Chang En-chia; Po Li-wei; Yang Ming-tse; Liou Wei-chi; Lai Yu-hua; Wu Yuan-cheng; Lee Chia-hsin; Chang Ching-hui; Chang Hsin-tien; Tsai Hsin-yu; Sung Shuo-yun; Chen Su-yu; Liang Ting-yu; Pan Tzu-chin
Boys singles	(China) Shi Yuqi	(Japan) Kanta Tsuneyama	(Hong Kong) Lee Cheuk Yiu
Boys singles	(China) Shi Yuqi	(Japan) Kanta Tsuneyama	(China) Zhao Junpeng
Girls singles	(Japan) Akane Yamaguchi	(China) Chen Yufei	(Singapore) Liang Xiaoyu
Girls singles	(Japan) Akane Yamaguchi	(China) Chen Yufei	(Thailand) Busanan Ongbumrungpan
Boys doubles	(China) Huang Kaixiang (China) Zheng Siwei	(South Korea) Kim Jae-hwan (South Korea) Kim Jung-ho	(Japan) Kenya Mitsuhashi (Japan) Yuta Watanabe
Boys doubles	(China) Huang Kaixiang (China) Zheng Siwei	(South Korea) Kim Jae-hwan (South Korea) Kim Jung-ho	(Japan) Hashiru Shimono (Japan) Kanta Tsuneyama
Girls doubles	(China) Chen Qingchen (China) Jia Yifan	(China) Du Yue (China) Li Yinhui	(Japan) Rira Kawashima (Japan) Saori Ozaki
Girls doubles	(China) Chen Qingchen (China) Jia Yifan	(China) Du Yue (China) Li Yinhui	(China) Jiang Binbin (China) Tang Pingyang
Mixed doubles	(China) Huang Kaixiang (China) Chen Qingchen	(South Korea) Kim Jung-ho (South Korea) Kong Hee-yong	(Indonesia) Muhammad Rian Ardianto (Indonesia) Zakia Ulfa
Mixed doubles	(China) Huang Kaixiang (China) Chen Qingchen	(South Korea) Kim Jung-ho (South Korea) Kong Hee-yong	(South Korea) Kim Jae-hwan (South Korea) Kim Hye-jeon

== Medal table ==
Rank	Nation	Gold	Silver	Bronze	Total
1	China (CHN)	5	2	2	9
2	Japan (JPN)	1	1	4	6
3	South Korea (KOR)	0	3	1	4
4	Chinese Taipei (TPE)	0	0	1	1
4	Hong Kong (HKG)	0	0	1	1
4	Indonesia (INA)	0	0	1	1
4	Singapore (SIN)	0	0	1	1
4	Thailand (THA)	0	0	1	1
Totals (8 entries)		6	6	12	24

== See also ==
- List of sporting events in Taiwan
