= Nisak Puji Lestari =

Indonesian badminton player (born 1997)

Personal information
- Born: 12 July 1997 (age 29) Boyolali, Central Java, Indonesia
- Height: 1.60 m (5 ft 3 in)

Sport
- Country: Indonesia
- Sport: Badminton
- Handedness: Right

Women's doubles
- Highest ranking: 63 (27 October 2016)
- BWF profile
Medal record
Women's badminton
Representing Indonesia
Islamic Solidarity Games
Silver medal – second place	2013 Palembang	Women's team
Bronze medal – third place	2013 Palembang	Women's doubles
World Junior Championships
Silver medal – second place	2014 Alor Setar	Mixed team
Asia Junior Championships
Bronze medal – third place	2015 Bangkok	Mixed team

Nisak Puji Lestari (born 12 July 1997) is an Indonesian badminton player. She was part of Indonesia team that won a silver medal at the 2014 World Junior Championships and a bronze medal at the 2015 Asian Junior Championships.

== Achievements ==
=== Islamic Solidarity Games ===
Women's doubles
Year	Tournament	Partner	Opponent	Score	Result
2013	Dempo Sports Hall, Palembang, Indonesia	(Indonesia) Ravenska Cintya Adifta	(Malaysia) Chow Mei Kuan (Malaysia) Shevon Jemie Lai	17–21, 18–21	Bronze

=== BWF International Challenge/Series ===
Women's doubles
Year	Tournament	Partner	Opponent	Score	Result
2015	Vietnam International	(Indonesia) Meirisa Cindy Sahputri	(Indonesia) Gebby Ristiyani Imawan (Indonesia) Tiara Rosalia Nuraidah	8–21, 21–19, 15–21	(silver) Runner-up
2016	Indonesia International	(Indonesia) Meirisa Cindy Sahputri	(Malaysia) Lim Yin Loo (Malaysia) Yap Cheng Wen	21–14, 10–15 retired	(silver) Runner-up
2017	Singapore International	(Indonesia) Rahmadhani Hastiyanti Putri	(Indonesia) Tania Oktaviani Kusumah (Indonesia) Vania Arianti Sukoco	21–19, 26–24	(gold) Winner

BWF International Challenge tournament
BWF International Series tournament

== Performance timeline ==
Key

W	Won	F	Finalist	SF	Semi-finalist
QF	Quarter-finalist	#R	Rounds 4, 3, 2, 1	RR	Round-robin stage
Q#	Qualification round	A	Absent	w/d	Withdrew
G	Gold	S	Silver	B	Bronze
NH	Not held	N/A	Not applicable	DNQ	Did not qualify

=== Indonesian team ===
- Junior level

Team events	2014	2015
Asian Junior Championships		B
World Junior Championships	S	

Tournament	BWF World Tour	Best
Tournament	2018	Best
Indonesia Masters	1R	2R ('16)

Tournament	BWF Grand Prix and Grand Prix Gold			Best
Tournament	2015	2016	2017	Best
Indonesian Masters	1R	2R	NH	2R ('16)
