= Rira Kawashima =

Japanese badminton player (born 1996)

Personal information
- Born: 13 December 1996 (age 29) Saitama Prefecture, Japan
- Spouse: Takuro Hoki (m. 2020)

Sport
- Country: Japan
- Sport: Badminton
- Handedness: Right

Women's singles & doubles
- Highest ranking: 167 (WS 30 March 2017); 77 (WD 30 March 2017)
- BWF profile
Medal record
Women's badminton
Representing Japan
World Junior Championships
Bronze medal – third place	2014 Alor Setar	Mixed team
Asia Junior Championships
Bronze medal – third place	2014 Taipei	Girls' doubles
Bronze medal – third place	2014 Taipei	Mixed team

Rira Kawashima (川島里羅, Kawashima Rira; born 13 December 1996) is a Japanese badminton player.

== Personal life ==
Kawashima married badminton player Takuro Hoki in February 2020. They have three children: a son named Minato (born 8 April 2021), a daughter named Toa (born 9 June 2023), and a third child named Aoto (born 15 April 2026).

== Achievements ==
=== Asian Junior Championships ===
Girls' doubles
Year	Venue	Partner	Opponent	Score	Result	Ref.
2014	Taipei Gymnasium; Taipei, Taiwan	(Japan) Saori Ozaki	(China) Du Yue (China) Li Yinhui	18–21, 21–17, 17–21	Bronze	

=== BWF International Challenge/Series ===
Women singles
Year	Tournament	Opponent	Score	Result	Ref.
2016	Finnish Open	(Denmark) Anna Thea Madsen	21–19, 23–25, 12–21	(silver) Runner-up	

Women doubles
Year	Tournament	Partner	Opponent	Score	Result	Ref.
2017	Austrian Open	(Japan) Saori Ozaki	(China) Wu Qianqian (China) Xia Chunyu	18–21, 22–20, 21–11	(gold) Winner	
2019	Osaka International	(Japan) Saori Ozaki	(Japan) Sayaka Hobara (Japan) Natsuki Sone	21–14, 10–21, 16–21	(silver) Runner-up	

BWF International Challenge tournament
