= Jiang Binbin =

Chinese badminton player (born 1996)

Jiang Binbin 姜彬彬
Personal information
- Born: 31 May 1996 (age 30) Pingyang, Zhejiang, China
- Height: 1.61 m (5 ft 3 in)

Sport
- Country: China
- Sport: Badminton

Women's & mixed doubles
- Highest ranking: 149 (WD 20 April 2017); 384 (XD 20 April 2017)
- BWF profile
Medal record
Women's badminton
Representing China
World Junior Championships
Gold medal – first place	2014 Alor Setar	Mixed team
Bronze medal – third place	2014 Alor Setar	Girls' doubles
Asian Junior Championships
Bronze medal – third place	2014 Taipei	Girls' doubles

Jiang Binbin (Chinese: 姜彬彬; born 31 May 1996) is a Chinese badminton player.

== Achievements ==
=== BWF World Junior Championships ===
Girls' doubles
Year	Venue	Partner	Opponent	Score	Result
2014	Stadium Sultan Abdul Halim; Alor Setar, Malaysia	(China) Tang Pingyang	(Indonesia) Rosyita Eka Putri Sari (Indonesia) Apriani Rahayu	13–21, 16–21	Bronze

=== Asian Junior Championships ===
Girls' doubles
Year	Venue	Partner	Opponent	Score	Result
2014	Taipei Gymnasium; Taipei, Chinese Taipei	(China) Tang Pingyang	(China) Chen Qingchen (China) Jia Yifan	14–21, 13–21	Bronze

=== BWF International Challenge/Series ===
Women's doubles
Year	Tournament	Partner	Opponent	Score	Result
2016	Malaysia International	(China) Tang Pingyang	(Malaysia) Chow Mei Kuan (Malaysia) Lee Meng Yean	17–21, 21–17, 15–21	(silver) Runner-up

BWF International Challenge tournament
BWF International Series tournament
BWF Future Series tournament
