= Saori Ozaki =

Japanese badminton player (born 1996)

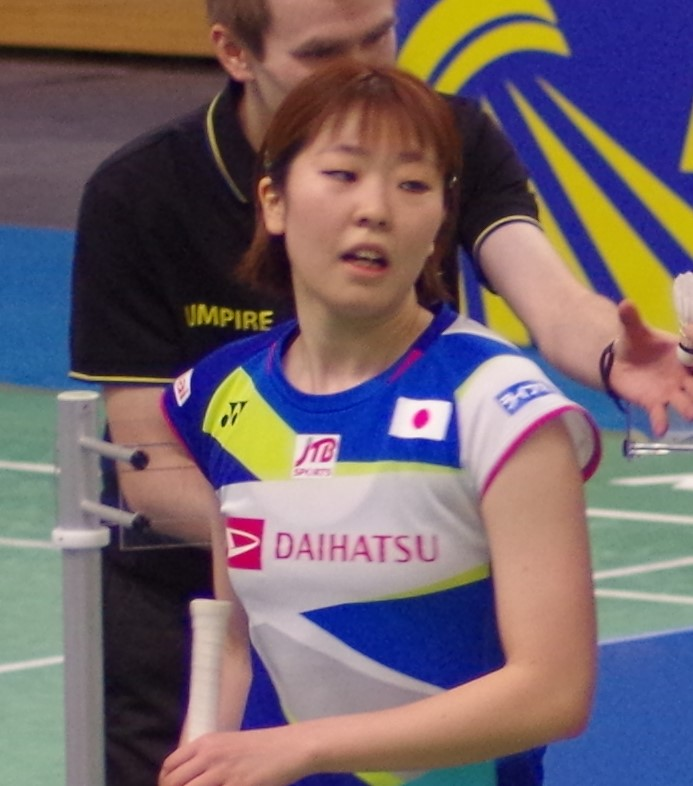
- Ozaki in 2020

Personal information
- Born: 10 July 1996 (age 30) Saitama Prefecture, Japan

Sport
- Country: Japan
- Sport: Badminton
- Handedness: Right
- Retired: 28 February 2024

Women's & mixed doubles
- Highest ranking: 77 (WD with Rira Kawashima 30 March 2017); 42 (XD with Yujiro Nishikawa 17 January 2023)
- BWF profile
Medal record
Women's badminton
Representing Japan
World Junior Championships
Bronze medal – third place	2014 Alor Setar	Mixed team
Asian Junior Championships
Bronze medal – third place	2014 Taipei	Girls' doubles
Bronze medal – third place	2014 Taipei	Mixed team

Saori Ozaki (尾崎沙織, Ozaki Saori; born 10 July 1996) is a Japanese badminton player and member of the NTT East badminton team.

== Achievements ==
=== Asian Junior Championships ===
Girls' doubles
Year	Venue	Partner	Opponent	Score	Result	Ref.
2014	Taipei Gymnasium, Taipei, Taiwan	(Japan) Rira Kawashima	(China) Du Yue (China) Li Yinhui	18–21, 21–17, 17–21	Bronze	

=== BWF International Challenge/Series (5 titles, 1 runner-up) ===
Women doubles
Year	Tournament	Partner	Opponent	Score	Result	Ref.
2017	Austrian Open	(Japan) Rira Kawashima	(China) Wu Qianqian (China) Xia Chunyu	18–21, 22–20, 21–11	(gold) Winner	
2019	Osaka International	(Japan) Rira Kawashima	(Japan) Sayaka Hobara (Japan) Natsuki Sone	21–14, 10–21, 16–21	(silver) Runner-up	
2019	Denmark International	(Japan) Akane Watanabe	(England) Chloe Birch (England) Lauren Smith	21–13, 21–18	(gold) Winner	
2020	Estonian International	(Japan) Rena Miyaura	(France) Vimala Hériau (France) Margot Lambert	21–18, 21–18	(gold) Winner	

Mixed doubles
Year	Tournament	Partner	Opponent	Score	Result	Ref.
2020	Estonian International	(Japan) Yujiro Nishikawa	(Japan) Tadayuki Urai (Japan) Rena Miyaura	21–18, 21–14	(gold) Winner	
2020	Swedish Open	(Japan) Yujiro Nishikawa	(Denmark) Mathias Thyrri (Denmark) Mai Surrow	21–17, 21–11	(gold) Winner	

BWF International Challenge tournament
BWF International Series tournament
