= Shi Longfei =

Chinese badminton player (born 1994)

Shi Longfei 史龙飞
Personal information
- Born: 18 January 1994 (age 32) Shanghai, China

Sport
- Country: China
- Sport: Badminton

Men's & mixed doubles
- Highest ranking: 97 (MD 15 January 2015); 153 (XD 15 June 2017)
- BWF profile
Medal record
Men's badminton
Representing China
Asian Championships
Bronze medal – third place	2014 Gimcheon	Men's doubles
Asian Junior Championships
Silver medal – second place	2012 Gimcheon	Mixed team

Shi Longfei (Chinese: 史龙飞; pinyin: Shǐ Lóngfēi; born 18 January 1994) is a Chinese badminton player from Shanghai. He was part of the Chinese junior team that won the mixed team silver medal at the 2012 Asian Junior Championships. Teamed-up with Chen Zhuofu in the men's doubles, they finished as the semi-finalist and settled for the bronze medal at the 2014 Asian Championships, defeated by their teammates Li Junhui and Liu Yuchen with the score 9–21, 14–21. Shi was the mixed doubles champion at the 2017 Vietnam International tournament partnered with Tang Pingyang.

== Achievements ==
=== Asian Championships ===
Men's doubles
Year	Venue	Partner	Opponent	Score	Result
2014	Gimcheon Indoor Stadium; Gimcheon, South Korea	(China) Chen Zhuofu	(China) Li Junhui (China) Liu Yuchen	9–21, 14–21	Bronze

=== BWF International Challenge/Series ===
Mixed doubles
Year	Tournament	Partner	Opponent	Score	Result
2017	Vietnam International	(China) Tang Pingyang	(Indonesia) Irfan Fadhilah (Indonesia) Weni Anggraini	21–16, 19–21, 21–15	(gold) Winner

BWF International Challenge tournament
BWF International Series tournament
BWF Future Series tournament
