= Tang Pingyang =

Chinese badminton player (born 1996)

Tang Pingyang 唐平阳
Personal information
- Born: 19 January 1996 (age 30) Nantong, Jiangsu, China

Sport
- Country: China
- Sport: Badminton

Women's & mixed doubles
- Highest ranking: 206 (WD) 19 Sep 2013; 748 (XD) 20 Aug 2015
- BWF profile
Medal record
Badminton
Representing China
World Junior Championships
Gold medal – first place	2014 Alor Setar	Mixed team
Bronze medal – third place	2014 Alor Setar	Girls' doubles
Asian Junior Championships
Gold medal – first place	2014 Taipei	Mixed team
Bronze medal – third place	2014 Taipei	Girls' doubles

Tang Pingyang (Chinese: 唐平阳; born 19 January 1996) is a Chinese badminton player.

== Achievements ==
=== BWF World Junior Championships ===
Girls' Doubles
Year	Venue	Partner	Opponent	Score	Result
2014	Stadium Sultan Abdul Halim; Alor Setar, Malaysia	(China) Jiang Binbin	(Indonesia) Rosyita Eka Putri Sari (Indonesia) Apriani Rahayu	13–21, 16–21	Bronze

=== Asia Junior Championships ===
Girls' Doubles
Year	Venue	Partner	Opponent	Score	Result
2014	Taipei Gymnasium; Taipei, Chinese Taipei	(China) Jiang Binbin	(China) Chen Qingchen (China) Jia Yifan	14–21, 13–21	Bronze

=== BWF International Challenge/Series ===
Women's doubles
Year	Tournament	Partner	Opponent	Score	Result
2016	Malaysia International	(China) Jiang Binbin	(Malaysia) Chow Mei Kuan (Malaysia) Lee Meng Yean	17–21, 21–17, 15–21	(silver) Runner-up

Mixed doubles
Year	Tournament	Partner	Opponent	Score	Result
2017	Vietnam International	(China) Shi Longfei	(Indonesia) Irfan Fadhilah (Indonesia) Weni Anggraini	21–16, 19–21, 21–15	(gold) Winner

BWF International Challenge tournament
BWF International Series tournament
BWF Future Series tournament
