= Li Yinhui =

Chinese badminton player (born 1997)

Li Yinhui 李茵晖
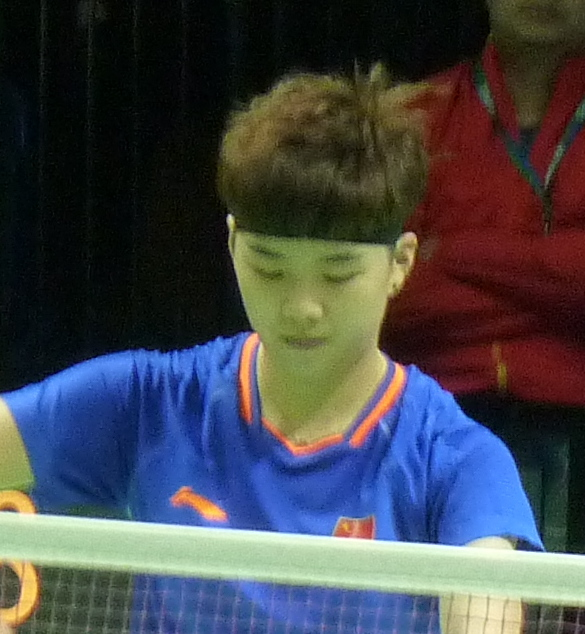
- Li at German Open 2019

Personal information
- Born: 11 March 1997 (age 29) Wuhan, Hubei, China
- Height: 1.72 m (5 ft 8 in)

Sport
- Country: China
- Sport: Badminton
- Handedness: Right
- Retired: January 2022

Women's & mixed doubles
- Highest ranking: 5 (WD with Du Yue 17 March 2020); 3 (XD with Zhang Nan 24 August 2017)
- BWF profile
Medal record
Women's badminton
Representing China
World Championships
Bronze medal – third place	2018 Nanjing	Mixed doubles
Bronze medal – third place	2019 Basel	Women's doubles
Sudirman Cup
Gold medal – first place	2019 Nanning	Mixed team
Silver medal – second place	2017 Gold Coast	Mixed team
Asia Championships
Bronze medal – third place	2017 Wuhan	Women's doubles
Bronze medal – third place	2018 Wuhan	Mixed doubles
Asia Mixed Team Championships
Gold medal – first place	2019 Hong Kong	Mixed team
Bronze medal – third place	2017 Ho Chi Minh	Mixed team
Asian Team Championships
Silver medal – second place	2018 Alor Setar	Women's team
World Junior Championships
Gold medal – first place	2014 Alor Setar	Mixed team
Gold medal – first place	2015 Lima	Mixed team
Silver medal – second place	2015 Lima	Girls' doubles
Bronze medal – third place	2013 Bangkok	Mixed team
Bronze medal – third place	2014 Alor Setar	Girls' doubles
Asian Junior Championships
Gold medal – first place	2014 Taipei	Mixed team
Gold medal – first place	2015 Bangkok	Girls' doubles
Gold medal – first place	2015 Bangkok	Mixed team
Silver medal – second place	2014 Taipei	Girls' doubles

Li Yinhui (simplified Chinese: 李茵晖; traditional Chinese: 李茵暉; pinyin: Lǐ Yīnhuī; born 11 March 1997) is a Chinese retired badminton player. She won the silver medal at the 2014 Asian Junior Championships in the girls' doubles event partnered with Du Yue. She and Du Yue then made it to the gold medal 2015. Together they won a silver medal at the 2015 BWF World Junior Championships after earning a bronze the previous year. At the 2018 BWF World Championships, Li took a bronze medal in the mixed doubles together with Zhang Nan.

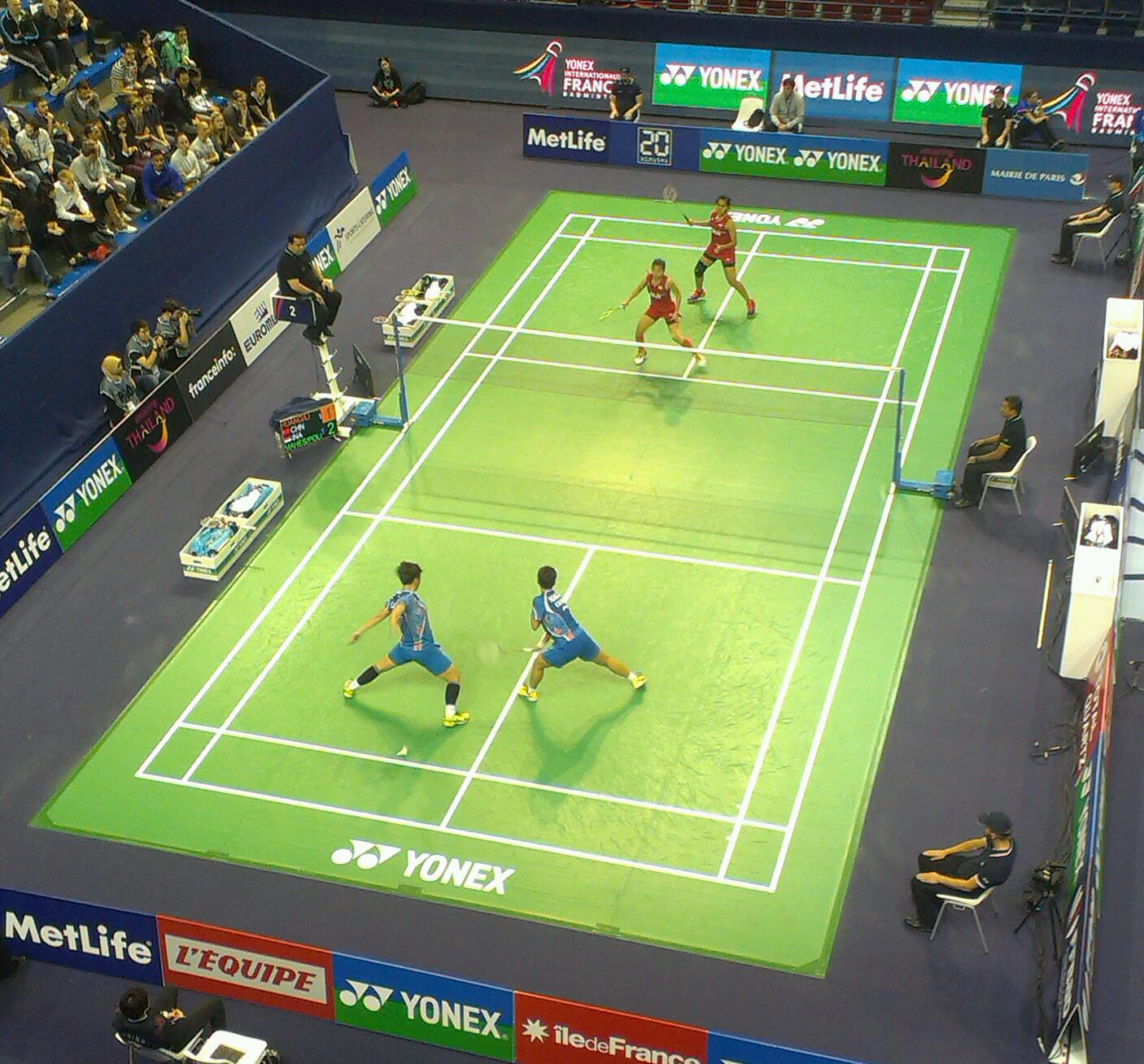
Li Yinhui (lower left corner) in the 2016 French Super Series

== Career ==
Li competed at the 2020 Summer Olympics in Tokyo, Japan. Partnered with Du Yue, she finished in the quarter-finals after defeated by the eventual gold medalist Greysia Polii and Apriyani Rahayu of Indonesia in rubber games.

Li announced her retirement through her social media account. Chinese media reported that the women's doubles pair Li Yinhui and Du Yue world ranking were removed on 25 January 2022. Based on BWF interview, Li has a complication arising out of pneumonia, which, added to a genetic heart ailment, necessitated constant medication.

== Achievements ==
=== BWF World Championships ===
Women's doubles
Year	Venue	Partner	Opponent	Score	Result
2019	St. Jakobshalle, Basel, Switzerland	(China) Du Yue	(Japan) Yuki Fukushima (Japan) Sayaka Hirota	11–21, 17–21	Bronze

Mixed doubles
Year	Venue	Partner	Opponent	Score	Result
2018	Nanjing Youth Olympic Sports Park, Nanjing, China	(China) Zhang Nan	(China) Zheng Siwei (China) Huang Yaqiong	21–19, 12–21, 10–21	Bronze

=== Asian Championships ===
Women's doubles
Year	Venue	Partner	Opponent	Score	Result
2017	Wuhan Sports Center Gymnasium, Wuhan, China	(China) Huang Dongping	(South Korea) Kim Hye-rin (South Korea) Yoo Hae-won	13–21, 17–21	Bronze

Mixed doubles
Year	Venue	Partner	Opponent	Score	Result
2018	Wuhan Sports Center Gymnasium, Wuhan, China	(China) Zhang Nan	(China) Wang Yilyu (China) Huang Dongping	21–18, 18–21, 17–21	Bronze

=== BWF World Junior Championships ===
Girls' doubles
Year	Venue	Partner	Opponent	Score	Result
2014	Stadium Sultan Abdul Halim, Alor Setar, Malaysia	(China) Du Yue	(China) Chen Qingchen (China) Jia Yifan	11–21, 14–21	Bronze
2015	Centro de Alto Rendimiento de la Videna, Lima, Peru	(China) Du Yue	(China) Chen Qingchen (China) Jia Yifan	18–21, 21–13, 11–21	Silver

=== Asian Junior Championships ===
Girls' doubles
Year	Venue	Partner	Opponent	Score	Result
2014	Taipei Gymnasium, Taipei, Taiwan	(China) Du Yue	(China) Chen Qingchen (China) Jia Yifan	11–21, 18–21	Silver
2015	CPB Badminton Training Center, Bangkok, Thailand	(China) Du Yue	(China) Chen Qingchen (China) Jia Yifan	21–14, 18–21, 21–18	Gold

=== BWF World Tour (3 titles, 5 runners-up) ===
The BWF World Tour, which was announced on 19 March 2017 and implemented in 2018, is a series of elite badminton tournaments sanctioned by the Badminton World Federation (BWF). The BWF World Tour is divided into levels of World Tour Finals, Super 1000, Super 750, Super 500, Super 300 (part of the HSBC World Tour), and the BWF Tour Super 100.

Women's doubles
Year	Tournament	Level	Partner	Opponent	Score	Result
2018	Lingshui China Masters	Super 100	(China) Du Yue	(China) Huang Dongping (China) Li Wenmei	21–16, 21–17	(gold) Winner
2019	German Open	Super 300	(China) Du Yue	(Japan) Misaki Matsutomo (Japan) Ayaka Takahashi	22–20, 21–15	(gold) Winner
2019	Malaysia Open	Super 750	(China) Du Yue	(China) Chen Qingchen (China) Jia Yifan	14–21, 15–21	(silver) Runner-up
2019	Thailand Open	Super 500	(China) Du Yue	(Japan) Shiho Tanaka (Japan) Koharu Yonemoto	19–21, 21–14, 13–21	(silver) Runner-up
2019	Macau Open	Super 300	(China) Du Yue	(Thailand) Jongkolphan Kititharakul (Thailand) Rawinda Prajongjai	21–16, 10–21, 21–12	(gold) Winner
2020	Malaysia Masters	Super 500	(China) Du Yue	(China) Li Wenmei (China) Zheng Yu	19–21, 21–16, 19–21	(silver) Runner-up
2020	All England Open	Super 1000	(China) Du Yue	(Japan) Yuki Fukushima (Japan) Sayaka Hirota	13–21, 15–21	(silver) Runner-up

Mixed doubles
Year	Tournament	Level	Partner	Opponent	Score	Result
2018	China Open	Super 1000	(China) Zhang Nan	(China) Zheng Siwei (China) Huang Yaqiong	16–21, 9–21	(silver) Runner-up

=== BWF Superseries (3 runners-up) ===
The BWF Superseries, which was launched on 14 December 2006 and implemented in 2007, was a series of elite badminton tournaments, sanctioned by the Badminton World Federation (BWF). BWF Superseries levels were Superseries and Superseries Premier. A season of Superseries consisted of twelve tournaments around the world that had been introduced since 2011. Successful players were invited to the Superseries Finals, which were held at the end of each year.

Women's doubles
Year	Tournament	Partner	Opponent	Score	Result
2016	China Open	(China) Huang Dongping	(South Korea) Chang Ye-na (South Korea) Lee So-hee	21–13, 14–21, 17–21	(silver) Runner-up
2016	Hong Kong Open	(China) Huang Dongping	(Denmark) Christinna Pedersen (Denmark) Kamilla Rytter Juhl	19–21, 10–21	(silver) Runner-up

Mixed doubles
Year	Tournament	Partner	Opponent	Score	Result
2016	China Open	(China) Zhang Nan	(Indonesia) Tontowi Ahmad (Indonesia) Liliyana Natsir	13–21, 22–20, 16–21	(silver) Runner-up

BWF Super Series Premier tournament
BWF Super Series tournament

=== BWF Grand Prix (5 titles, 2 runners-up) ===
The BWF Grand Prix had two levels, the Grand Prix and Grand Prix Gold. It was a series of badminton tournaments sanctioned by the Badminton World Federation (BWF) and played between 2007 and 2017.

Women's doubles
Year	Tournament	Partner	Opponent	Score	Result
2015	Thailand Open	(China) Huang Dongping	(South Korea) Chang Ye-na (South Korea) Lee So-hee	20–22, 21–11, 21–15	(gold) Winner
2017	German Open	(China) Huang Dongping	(Japan) Yuki Fukushima (Japan) Sayaka Hirota	21–15, 17–21, 15–21	(silver) Runner-up

Mixed doubles
Year	Tournament	Partner	Opponent	Score	Result
2016	Malaysia Masters	(China) Zheng Siwei	(Malaysia) Tan Kian Meng (Malaysia) Lai Pei Jing	21–14, 21–19	(gold) Winner
2016	New Zealand Open	(China) Zheng Siwei	(Malaysia) Chan Peng Soon (Malaysia) Goh Liu Ying	19–21, 20–22	(silver) Runner-up
2016	Macau Open	(China) Zhang Nan	(Hong Kong) Tang Chun Man (Hong Kong) Tse Ying Suet	21–19, 21–15	(gold) Winner
2017	Thailand Masters	(China) Zhang Nan	(Thailand) Dechapol Puavaranukroh (Thailand) Sapsiree Taerattanachai	21–11, 20–22, 21–13	(gold) Winner
2017	German Open	(China) Zhang Nan	(China) Lu Kai (China) Huang Yaqiong	22–20, 21–11	(gold) Winner

BWF Grand Prix Gold tournament
BWF Grand Prix tournament
