= 2013 BWF Super Series =

Tournament details
- Dates: 8 January – 15 December 2013
- Edition: 7th

The 2013 BWF Super Series was the seventh season of the BWF Super Series. The season started with a Super Series Premier in Korea and ended in Hong Kong. The Masters Finals was held in Kuala Lumpur, Malaysia.

== Schedule ==
Below is the schedule released by the Badminton World Federation:

Tour	Official title	Venue	City	Date		Prize money USD	Report
Tour	Official title	Venue	City	Start	Finish	Prize money USD	Report
1	(South Korea) Korea Open Super Series Premier	SK Handball Stadium	Seoul	January 8	January 13	1,000,000	Report
2	Malaysia Open Super Series	Putra Indoor Stadium	Kuala Lumpur	January 15	January 20	400,000	Report
3	All England Super Series Premier	Arena Birmingham	Birmingham	March 5	March 10	400,000	Report
4	India Open Super Series	Siri Fort Sports Complex	New Delhi	April 23	April 28	200,000	Report
5	Indonesia Super Series Premier	Istora Senayan	Jakarta	June 11	June 16	700,000	Report
6	Singapore Super Series	Singapore Indoor Stadium	Singapore	June 18	June 23	200,000	Report
7	China Masters Super Series	Olympic Sports Centre Xincheng Gymnasium	Changzhou	September 10	September 15	250,000	Report
8	Japan Super Series	Yoyogi National Gymnasium	Tokyo	September 17	September 22	200,000	Report
9	Denmark Super Series Premier	Odense Sports Park	Odense	October 15	October 20	400,000	Report
10	(France) French Super Series	Stade Pierre de Coubertin	Paris	October 22	October 27	200,000	Report
11	China Open Super Series Premier	Yuanshen Sports Centre Stadium	Shanghai	November 12	November 17	450,000	Report
12	Hong Kong Super Series	Hong Kong Coliseum	Kowloon	November 19	November 24	350,000	Report
13	(Malaysia) Super Series Masters Finals	Kuala Lumpur Badminton Stadium	Kuala Lumpur	December 11	December 15	500,000	Report

Super Series Premier

== Results ==
=== Winners ===
Tour	Men's singles	Women's singles	Men's doubles	Women's doubles	Mixed doubles
(South Korea) Korea	(Malaysia) Lee Chong Wei	(South Korea) Sung Ji-hyun	(South Korea) Ko Sung-hyun (South Korea) Lee Yong-dae	(China) Wang Xiaoli (China) Yu Yang	(China) Zhang Nan (China) Zhao Yunlei
Malaysia	(Malaysia) Lee Chong Wei	(Chinese Taipei) Tai Tzu-ying	(Indonesia) Mohammad Ahsan (Indonesia) Hendra Setiawan	(China) Tian Qing (China) Bao Yixin	(Denmark) Joachim Fischer Nielsen (Denmark) Christinna Pedersen
England	(China) Chen Long	(Denmark) Tine Baun	(China) Liu Xiaolong (China) Qiu Zihan	(China) Wang Xiaoli (China) Yu Yang	(Indonesia) Tontowi Ahmad (Indonesia) Liliyana Natsir
India	(Malaysia) Lee Chong Wei	(Thailand) Ratchanok Intanon	(China) Liu Xiaolong (China) Qiu Zihan	(Japan) Miyuki Maeda (Japan) Satoko Suetsuna	(Indonesia) Tontowi Ahmad (Indonesia) Liliyana Natsir
Indonesia	(Malaysia) Lee Chong Wei	(China) Li Xuerui	(Indonesia) Mohammad Ahsan (Indonesia) Hendra Setiawan	(China) Cheng Shu (China) Bao Yixin	(China) Zhang Nan (China) Zhao Yunlei
Singapore	(Indonesia) Tommy Sugiarto	(China) Wang Yihan	(Indonesia) Mohammad Ahsan (Indonesia) Hendra Setiawan	(China) Tian Qing (China) Zhao Yunlei	(Indonesia) Tontowi Ahmad (Indonesia) Liliyana Natsir
China Masters	(China) Wang Zhengming	(China) Liu Xin	(South Korea) Ko Sung-hyun (South Korea) Lee Yong-dae	(China) Wang Xiaoli (China) Yu Yang	(China) Zhang Nan (China) Zhao Yunlei
Japan	(Malaysia) Lee Chong Wei	(Japan) Akane Yamaguchi	(Indonesia) Mohammad Ahsan (Indonesia) Hendra Setiawan	(China) Ma Jin (China) Tang Jinhua	(China) Zhang Nan (China) Zhao Yunlei
Denmark	(China) Chen Long	(China) Wang Yihan	(South Korea) Lee Yong-dae (South Korea) Yoo Yeon-seong	(China) Bao Yixin (China) Tang Jinhua	(China) Zhang Nan (China) Zhao Yunlei
(France) French	(Denmark) Jan Ø. Jørgensen	(China) Wang Shixian	(Indonesia) Markis Kido (Indonesia) Marcus Fernaldi Gideon	(China) Bao Yixin (China) Tang Jinhua	(China) Zhang Nan (China) Zhao Yunlei
China Open	(China) Chen Long	(China) Li Xuerui	(South Korea) Lee Yong-dae (South Korea) Yoo Yeon-seong	(China) Wang Xiaoli (China) Yu Yang	(Indonesia) Tontowi Ahmad (Indonesia) Liliyana Natsir
Hong Kong	(Malaysia) Lee Chong Wei	(China) Wang Yihan	(South Korea) Lee Yong-dae (South Korea) Yoo Yeon-seong	(China) Bao Yixin (China) Tang Jinhua	(England) Chris Adcock (England) Gabrielle White
(Malaysia) Masters Finals	(Malaysia) Lee Chong Wei	(China) Li Xuerui	(Indonesia) Mohammad Ahsan (Indonesia) Hendra Setiawan	(Denmark) Christinna Pedersen (Denmark) Kamilla Rytter Juhl	(Denmark) Joachim Fischer Nielsen (Denmark) Christinna Pedersen

=== Performance by countries ===
Tabulated below are the Super Series performances based on countries. Only countries who have won a title are listed:

Team	KOR	MAS	ENG	IND	INA	SIN	CHN	JPN	DEN	FRA	CHN	HKG	SSF	Total
China	2	1	3	1	3	2	4	2	4	3	3	2	1	31
Indonesia		1	1	1	1	3		1		1	1		1	11
Malaysia	1	1		1	1			1				1	1	7
Korea	2						1		1		1	1		6
Denmark		1	1							1			2	5
Japan				1				1						2
Chinese Taipei		1												1
Thailand				1										1
England												1		1

== Finals ==
=== Korea ===
Category	Winners	Runners-up	Score
Men's singles	(Malaysia) Lee Chong Wei	(China) Du Pengyu	21–12, 21–15
Women's singles	(South Korea) Sung Ji-hyun	(China) Wang Shixian	21–12, 22–20
Men's doubles	(South Korea) Ko Sung-hyun / Lee Yong-dae	(Denmark) Mathias Boe / Carsten Mogensen	19–21, 21–13, 21–10
Women's doubles	(China) Wang Xiaoli / Yu Yang	(China) Ma Jin / Tang Jinhua	21–17, 21–13
Mixed doubles	(China) Zhang Nan / Zhao Yunlei	(China) Xu Chen / Ma Jin	13–21, 21–16, 21–13

=== Malaysia ===
Category	Winners	Runners-up	Score
Men's singles	(Malaysia) Lee Chong Wei	(Indonesia) Sony Dwi Kuncoro	21–7, 21–8
Women's singles	(Chinese Taipei) Tai Tzu-ying	(China) Yao Xue	21–17, 21–14
Men's doubles	(Indonesia) Mohammad Ahsan / Hendra Setiawan	(South Korea) Ko Sung-hyun / Lee Yong-dae	21–15, 21–13
Women's doubles	(China) Bao Yixin / Tian Qing	(Japan) Misaki Matsutomo / Ayaka Takahashi	21–16, 21–14
Mixed doubles	(Denmark) Joachim Fischer Nielsen / Christinna Pedersen	(Malaysia) Chan Peng Soon / Goh Liu Ying	21–13, 21–18

=== All England ===
Category	Winners	Runners-up	Score
Men's singles	(China) Chen Long	(Malaysia) Lee Chong Wei	21–17, 21–18
Women's singles	(Denmark) Tine Baun	(Thailand) Ratchanok Intanon	21–14, 16–21, 21–10
Men's doubles	(China) Liu Xiaolong / Qiu Zihan	(Japan) Hiroyuki Endo / Kenichi Hayakawa	21–11, 21–9
Women's doubles	(China) Wang Xiaoli / Yu Yang	(China) Cheng Shu / Zhao Yunlei	21–18, 21–10
Mixed doubles	(Indonesia) Tontowi Ahmad / Liliyana Natsir	(China) Zhang Nan / Zhao Yunlei	21–13, 21–17

=== India ===
Category	Winners	Runners-up	Score
Men's singles	(Malaysia) Lee Chong Wei	(Japan) Kenichi Tago	21–15, 18–21, 21–17
Women's singles	(Thailand) Ratchanok Intanon	(Germany) Juliane Schenk	22–20, 21–14
Men's doubles	(China) Liu Xiaolong / Qiu Zihan	(South Korea) Ko Sung-hyun / Lee Yong-dae	22–20, 21–18
Women's doubles	(Japan) Miyuki Maeda / Satoko Suetsuna	(Denmark) Kamilla Rytter Juhl / Christinna Pedersen	12–21, 23–21, 21–18
Mixed doubles	(Indonesia) Tontowi Ahmad / Liliyana Natsir	(South Korea) Ko Sung-hyun / Kim Ha-na	21–16, 21–13

=== Indonesia ===
Category	Winners	Runners-up	Score
Men's singles	(Malaysia) Lee Chong Wei	(Germany) Marc Zwiebler	21–15, 21–14
Women's singles	(China) Li Xuerui	(Germany) Juliane Schenk	21–16, 18–21, 21–17
Men's doubles	(Indonesia) Mohammad Ahsan / Hendra Setiawan	(South Korea) Ko Sung-hyun / Lee Yong-dae	21–14, 21–18
Women's doubles	(China) Cheng Shu / Bao Yixin	(China) Wang Xiaoli / Yu Yang	15–21, 21–18, 21–18
Mixed doubles	(China) Zhang Nan / Zhao Yunlei	(Denmark) Joachim Fischer Nielsen / Christinna Pedersen	24–22, 20–22, 21–12

=== Singapore ===
Category	Winners	Runners-up	Score
Men's singles	(Indonesia) Tommy Sugiarto	(Thailand) Boonsak Ponsana	20–22, 21–5, 21–17
Women's singles	(China) Wang Yihan	(China) Li Xuerui	21–18, 21–12
Men's doubles	(Indonesia) Mohammad Ahsan / Hendra Setiawan	(South Korea) Ko Sung-hyun / Lee Yong-dae	21–15, 21–18
Women's doubles	(China) Tian Qing / Zhao Yunlei	(Japan) Misaki Matsutomo / Ayaka Takahashi	21–19, 21–16
Mixed doubles	(Indonesia) Tontowi Ahmad / Liliyana Natsir	(South Korea) Yoo Yeon-seong / Eom Hye-won	21–12, 21–12

=== China Masters ===
Category	Winners	Runners-up	Score
Men's singles	(China) Wang Zhengming	(South Korea) Son Wan-ho	11–21, 21–14, 24–22
Women's singles	(China) Liu Xin	(Thailand) Porntip Buranaprasertsuk	21–4, 13–21, 21–12
Men's doubles	(South Korea) Ko Sung-hyun / Lee Yong-dae	(Japan) Hiroyuki Endo / Kenichi Hayakawa	25–23, 21–19
Women's doubles	(China) Wang Xiaoli / Yu Yang	(China) Ma Jin / Tang Jinhua	21–17, 21–16
Mixed doubles	(China) Zhang Nan / Zhao Yunlei	(South Korea) Yoo Yeon-seong / Eom Hye-won	21–18, 21–12

=== Japan ===
Category	Winners	Runners-up	Score
Men's singles	(Malaysia) Lee Chong Wei	(Japan) Kenichi Tago	23–21, 21–17
Women's singles	(Japan) Akane Yamaguchi	(Japan) Shizuka Uchida	21–15, 21–19
Men's doubles	(Indonesia) Mohammad Ahsan / Hendra Setiawan	(China) Chai Biao / Hong Wei	22–20, 21–16
Women's doubles	(China) Ma Jin / Tang Jinhua	(Denmark) Kamilla Rytter Juhl / Christinna Pedersen	21–11, 21–14
Mixed doubles	(China) Zhang Nan / Zhao Yunlei	(China) Xu Chen / Ma Jin	Walkover

=== Denmark ===
Category	Winners	Runners-up	Score
Men's singles	(China) Chen Long	(Malaysia) Lee Chong Wei	24–22, 21–19
Women's singles	(China) Wang Yihan	(South Korea) Sung Ji-hyun	16–21, 21–18, 22–20
Men's doubles	(South Korea) Lee Yong-dae / Yoo Yeon-seong	(Indonesia) Mohammad Ahsan / Hendra Setiawan	21–19, 21–16
Women's doubles	(China) Bao Yixin / Tang Jinhua	(Denmark) Kamilla Rytter Juhl / Christinna Pedersen	21–16, 21–13
Mixed doubles	(China) Zhang Nan / Zhao Yunlei	(Indonesia) Tontowi Ahmad / Liliyana Natsir	21–11, 22–20

=== France ===
Category	Winners	Runners-up	Score
Men's singles	(Denmark) Jan Ø. Jørgensen	(Japan) Kenichi Tago	21–19, 23–21
Women's singles	(China) Wang Shixian	(Thailand) Porntip Buranaprasertsuk	21–18, 21–18
Men's doubles	(Indonesia) Markis Kido / Marcus Fernaldi Gideon	(Malaysia) Koo Kien Keat / Tan Boon Heong	21–16, 21–18
Women's doubles	(China) Bao Yixin / Tang Jinhua	(China) Tian Qing / Zhao Yunlei	21–13, 21–17
Mixed doubles	(China) Zhang Nan / Zhao Yunlei	(China) Xu Chen / Ma Jin	28–26, 21–17

=== China Open ===
Category	Winners	Runners-up	Score
Men's singles	(China) Chen Long	(China) Wang Zhengming	19–21, 21–8, 21–14
Women's singles	(China) Li Xuerui	(China) Wang Shixian	16–21, 21–17, 21–19
Men's doubles	(South Korea) Lee Yong-dae / Yoo Yeon-seong	(Malaysia) Hoon Thien How / Tan Wee Kiong	21–13, 21–12
Women's doubles	(China) Wang Xiaoli / Yu Yang	(China) Bao Yixin / Zhong Qianxin	21–13, 21–7
Mixed doubles	(Indonesia) Tontowi Ahmad / Liliyana Natsir	(Denmark) Joachim Fischer Nielsen / Christinna Pedersen	21–10, 5–21, 21–17

=== Hong Kong ===
Category	Winners	Runners-up	Score
Men's singles	(Malaysia) Lee Chong Wei	(Indonesia) Sony Dwi Kuncoro	21–13, 21–9
Women's singles	(China) Wang Yihan	(China) Wang Shixian	21–13, 16–21, 21–15
Men's doubles	(South Korea) Lee Yong-dae / Yoo Yeon-seong	(South Korea) Kim Ki-jung / Kim Sa-rang	12–21, 21–15, 21–18
Women's doubles	(China) Bao Yixin / Tang Jinhua	(China) Ou Dongni / Tang Yuanting	18–21, 21–16, 21–15
Mixed doubles	(England) Chris Adcock / Gabrielle White	(China) Liu Cheng / Bao Yixin	21–14, 24–22

=== Masters Finals ===
Category	Winners	Runners-up	Score
Men's singles	(Malaysia) Lee Chong Wei	(Indonesia) Tommy Sugiarto	21–10, 21–12
Women's singles	(China) Li Xuerui	(Chinese Taipei) Tai Tzu-ying	21–8, 21–14
Men's doubles	(Indonesia) Mohammad Ahsan / Hendra Setiawan	(South Korea) Kim Ki-jung / Kim Sa-rang	21–14, 21–16
Women's doubles	(Denmark) Christinna Pedersen / Kamilla Rytter Juhl	(China) Ma Jin / Tang Jinhua	21–19, 21–12
Mixed doubles	(Denmark) Joachim Fischer Nielsen / Christinna Pedersen	(China) Zhang Nan / Zhao Yunlei	12–21, 21–19, 21–10
