= 2013 Hong Kong Super Series =

2013 Hong Kong Open
Tournament details
- Dates: 19–24 November 2013
- Total prize money: US$350,000
- Venue: Hong Kong Coliseum
- Location: Kowloon

The 2013 Hong Kong Open Superseries is a top level badminton competition which took place from November 19, 2013, to November 24, 2013, in Kowloon, Hong Kong. It was the twelfth BWF Superseries competition on the 2013 BWF Superseries schedule. The total purse for the event is $350,000. A qualification round was held for all five disciplines.

== Men's singles ==
=== Seeds ===
1. (Malaysia) Lee Chong Wei
2. (China) Chen Long
3. (Japan) Kenichi Tago
4. (China) Du Pengyu
5. (Indonesia) Tommy Sugiarto
6. (Denmark) Jan Ø. Jørgensen
7. (Vietnam) Nguyễn Tiến Minh
8. (Thailand) Boonsak Ponsana

=== Top half ===
First Round
1	(Malaysia) Lee C W	21	21
(India) S Kidambi	18	14
(Malaysia) Chong W F	21	21
(Japan) S Sasaki	18	12
6	(Denmark) J Ø Jørgensen	21	20	21
Q4	(Hong Kong) Chan Y K	9	22	18
(Japan) T Ueda	17	18
(Chinese Taipei) Chou T-c	21	21
4	(China) Du PY	15	14
(England) R Ouseph	21	21
(China) Chen YK	19	16
(Denmark) H-K Vittinghus	21	21
8	(Thailand) B Ponsana	21	21
(Chinese Taipei) Hsu J-h	19	15
(Hong Kong) Wong W K	21	13	15
Q3	(Hong Kong) Wei N	19	21	21

Second Round
1	(Malaysia) Lee C W	21	21
(Malaysia) Chong W F	12	18
6	(Denmark) J Ø Jørgensen	21	21
(Chinese Taipei) Chou T-c	14	14
(England) R Ouseph	21	19	14
(Denmark) H-K Vittinghus	12	21	21
8	(Thailand) B Ponsana	21	21
Q3	(Hong Kong) Wei N	13	10

Quarterfinals
1	(Malaysia) Lee C W	21	21
6	(Denmark) J Ø Jørgensen	8	17
(Denmark) H-K Vittinghus	17	16
8	(Thailand) B Ponsana	21	21

Semifinals
1	(Malaysia) Lee C W	21	21
8	(Thailand) B Ponsana	12	7

=== Bottom half ===
First Round
(Indonesia) S D Kuncoro	21	12	21
(Thailand) T Saensomboonsuk	14	21	14
(India) A Jayaram	21	21
7	(Vietnam) Nguyễn T M	7	12
(Japan) K Momota	23	12	18
(Hong Kong) Hu Y	21	21	21
(China) Gao H	21	17	15
3	(Japan) K Tago	8	21	21
Q2	(Japan) K Sakai	21	16	10
(Denmark) V Axelsen	14	21	21
Q1	(Hong Kong) Ng K L	17	21	20
5	(Indonesia) T Sugiarto	21	17	22
(India) P Kashyap	14	10
(China) Wang ZM	21	21
(Germany) M Zwiebler	w	/	o
2	(China) Chen L

Second Round
(Indonesia) S D Kuncoro	21	21
(India) A Jayaram	18	12
(Hong Kong) Hu Y	21	19	23
3	(Japan) K Tago	18	21	25
(Denmark) V Axelsen	17	15
5	(Indonesia) T Sugiarto	21	21
(China) Wang ZM	21	15	21
(Germany) M Zwiebler	15	21	16

Quarterfinals
(Indonesia) S D Kuncoro	23	21
3	(Japan) K Tago	21	18
5	(Indonesia) T Sugiarto	17	21	21
(China) Wang ZM	21	9	12

Semifinals
(Indonesia) S D Kuncoro	21	8
5	(Indonesia) T Sugiarto	14	3^{r}

=== Finals ===
Semifinals
1	(Malaysia) Lee Chong Wei	21	21
8	(Thailand) Boonsak Ponsana	12	7
(Indonesia) Sony Dwi Kuncoro	21	8
5	(Indonesia) Tommy Sugiarto	14	3^{r}

Final
1	(Malaysia) Lee Chong Wei	21	21
(Indonesia) Sony Dwi Kuncoro	13	9

== Women's singles ==
=== Seeds ===
1. (China) Li Xuerui
2. (Thailand) Ratchanok Intanon
3. (China) Wang Yihan
4. (China) Wang Shixian
5. (South Korea) Sung Ji-hyun
6. (Germany) Juliane Schenk
7. (India) Saina Nehwal
8. (Chinese Taipei) Tai Tzu-ying

=== Top half ===
First Round
1	(China) Li XR	9	21	21
(Singapore) Gu J	21	11	7
(Japan) K Imabeppu	17	13
(Thailand) B Ongbamrungphan	21	21
7	(India) S Nehwal	21	21
(Indonesia) B Manuputty	14	16
(Thailand) P Burnaprasertsuk	21	21
(Japan) E Hirose	15	11
3	(China) Wang YH	21	21
(Thailand) S Ponsana	15	16
(Singapore) Chen JY	15	14
(Japan) S Takahashi	21	21
5	(South Korea) Sung J-h	4^{r}
Q4	(Japan) A Ohori	5
(Japan) Y Hashimoto	22	16	10
(China) Han L	20	21	21

Second Round
1	(China) Li XR	19	21	21
(Thailand) B Ongbamrungphan	21	16	17
7	(India) S Nehwal	17	21	15
(Thailand) P Buranaprasertsuk	21	9	21
3	(China) Wang YH	15	21	21
(Japan) S Takahashi	21	19	18
Q4	(Japan) A Ohori	14	9
(China) Han L	21	21

Quarterfinals
1	(China) Li XR	15	19
(Thailand) P Buranaprasertsuk	21	21
3	(China) Wang YH	21	21
(China) Han L	13	10

Semifinals
(Thailand) P Buranaprasertsuk	21	15	13
3	(China) Wang YH	17	21	21

=== Bottom half ===
First Round
(Canada) M Li	21	21
Q1	(Austria) S Prutsch	19	18
Q3	(Hong Kong) Tsang W C	18	16
6	(Germany) J Schenk	21	21
Q2	(Hong Kong) Cheung N Y	12	14
(Indonesia) A Yuswandari	21	21
(Thailand) N Jindapol	13	21	17
4	(China) Wang SX	21	11	21
(Hong Kong) Yip P Y	21	24	9
(Japan) M Mitani	23	22	21
(Hong Kong) Chan T K	19	16
8	(Chinese Taipei) Tai T-y	21	21
(South Korea) Bae Y-j	21	21
(Canada) N Grether	13	14
(India) P. V. Sindhu	16	17
2	(Thailand) R Intanon	21	21

Second Round
(Canada) M Li	15	12
6	(Germany) J Schenk	21	21
(Indonesia) A Yuswandari	24	13	17
4	(China) Wang SX	22	21	21
(Japan) M Mitani	25	21
8	(Chinese Taipei) Tai T-y	23	16
(South Korea) Bae Y-j	21	21
2	(Thailand) R Intanon	14	13

Quarterfinals
6	(Germany) J Schenk	16	16
4	(China) Wang SX	21	21
(Japan) M Mitani	21	23
(South Korea) Bae Y-j	13	21

Semifinals
4	(China) Wang SX	21	21
(Japan) M Mitani	13	17

=== Finals ===
Semifinals
(Thailand) Porntip Buranaprasertsuk	21	15	13
3	(China) Wang Yihan	17	21	21
4	(China) Wang Shixian	21	21
(Japan) Minatsu Mitani	13	17

Final
3	(China) Wang Yihan	21	16	21
4	(China) Wang Shixian	13	21	15

== Men's doubles ==
=== Seeds ===
1. (Indonesia) Mohammad Ahsan / Hendra Setiawan
2. (Japan) Hiroyuki Endo / Kenichi Hayakawa
3. (China) Liu Xiaolong / Qiu Zihan
4. (South Korea) Kim Gi-jung / Kim Sa-rang
5. (Chinese Taipei) Lee Sheng-mu / Tsai Chia-hsin
6. (China) Cai Yun / Fu Haifeng
7. (China) Chai Biao / Hong Wei
8. (Indonesia) Angga Pratama / Rian Agung Saputro

=== Top half ===
First Round
1	(Indonesia) M Ahsan (Indonesia) H Setiawan	21	21
(India) P Chopra (India) A Dewalker	18	19
(China) Kang J (China) Liu C	21	12	21
(Hong Kong) Chan Y L (Hong Kong) Lee C H	17	21	13
6	(China) Cai Y (China) Fu HF	19	21	21
(Germany) M Fuchs (Germany) J Schöttler	21	13	14
(Russia) V Ivanov (Russia) I Sozonov	21	21
PFQ	(India) M Attri (India) B Sumeeth Reddy	9	15
3	(China) Liu XL (China) Qiu ZH	21	21
(Netherlands) R Bosch (Netherlands) K Ridder	13	15
(South Korea) Lee Y-d (South Korea) Yoo Y-s	21	21
(Indonesia) Y S Dasuki (Indonesia) H A Gunawan	17	15
5	(Chinese Taipei) Lee S-m (Chinese Taipei) Tsai C-h	15	22	21
(Thailand) W Ampunsuwan (Thailand) P Chalardchaleam	21	20	11
Q2	(Germany) A Heinz (Germany) M Schwenger	11	22	12
(Japan) H Hashimoto (Japan) N Hirata	21	20	21

Second Round
1	(Indonesia) M Ahsan (Indonesia) H Setiawan	22	21
(China) Kang J (China) Liu C	20	13
6	(China) Cai Y (China) Fu HF	16	21	20
(Russia) V Ivanov (Russia) I Sozonov	21	18	22
3	(China) Liu XL (China) Qiu ZH	21	9	6
(South Korea) Lee Y-d (South Korea) Yoo Y-s	17	21	21
5	(Chinese Taipei) Lee S-m (Chinese Taipei) Tsai C-h	23	21
(Japan) H Hashimoto (Japan) N Hirata	21	10

Quarterfinals
1	(Indonesia) M Ahsan (Indonesia) H Setiawan	21	14	22
(Russia) V Ivanov (Russia) I Sozonov	15	21	20
(South Korea) Lee Y-d (South Korea) Yoo Y-s	21	21
5	(Chinese Taipei) Lee S-m (Chinese Taipei) Tsai C-h	14	10

Semifinals
1	(Indonesia) M Ahsan (Indonesia) H Setiawan	20	20
(South Korea) Lee Y-d (South Korea) Yoo Y-s	22	22

=== Bottom half ===
First Round
Q3	(Chinese Taipei) Lu C-y (Malaysia) Mak H C	14	21	18
Q1	(Indonesia) A Y Chandra (Japan) S Ikeda	21	17	21
(Chinese Taipei) Liang J-w (Chinese Taipei) Liao K-h	12	10
7	(China) Chai B (China) Hong W	21	21
(Japan) H Saeki (Japan) R Taohata	19	15
Q4	(Hong Kong) Chan T K (Hong Kong) Lo L K	21	21
(Thailand) M Jongjit (Thailand) N Phuangphuapet	21	21	13
4	(South Korea) Kim G-j (South Korea) Kim S-r	23	19	21
(Malaysia) Gan T C (Malaysia) Ong S H	14	8^{r}
(Japan) T Kamura (Japan) K Sonoda	21	11
(Chinese Taipei) Chen H-l (Chinese Taipei) Lu C-p	16	22	17
8	(Indonesia) M F Gideon (Indonesia) M Kido	21	20	21
(England) C Adcock (England) A Ellis	21	21
(Germany) P Käsbauer (Germany) J Zurwonne	16	17
(Indonesia) B Angriawan (Indonesia) R K Suwardi	15	21	21
2	(Japan) H Endo (Japan) K Hayakawa	21	18	17

Second Round
Q1	(Indonesia) A Y Chandra (Japan) S Ikeda	18	21	17
7	(China) Chai B (China) Hong W	21	14	21
Q4	(Hong Kong) Chan T K (Hong Kong) Lo L K	12	12
4	(South Korea) Kim G-j (South Korea) Kim S-r	21	21
(Japan) T Kamura (Japan) K Sonoda	21	12	8
PFQ	(Indonesia) M F Gideon (Indonesia) M Kido	15	21	21
(England) C Adcock (England) A Ellis	21	24
(Indonesia) B Angriawan (Indonesia) R K Suwardi	16	22

Quarterfinals
7	(China) Chai B (China) Hong W	19	22	18
4	(South Korea) Kim G-j (South Korea) Kim S-r	21	20	21
PFQ	(Indonesia) M F Gideon (Indonesia) M Kido	19	15
(England) C Adcock (England) A Ellis	21	21

Semifinals
4	(South Korea) Kim G-j (South Korea) Kim S-r	21	21
(England) C Adcock (England) A Ellis	13	14

=== Finals ===
Semifinals
1	(Indonesia) Mohammad Ahsan (Indonesia) Hendra Setiawan	20	20
(South Korea) Lee Yong-dae (South Korea) Yoo Yeon-seong	22	22
4	(South Korea) Kim Gi-jung (South Korea) Kim Sa-rang	21	21
(England) Chris Adcock (England) Andrew Ellis	13	14

Final
(South Korea) Lee Yong-dae (South Korea) Yoo Yeon-seong	12	21	21
4	(South Korea) Kim Gi-jung (South Korea) Kim Sa-rang	21	15	18

== Women's doubles ==
=== Seeds ===
1. (China) Wang Xiaoli / Yu Yang
2. (Denmark) Christinna Pedersen / Kamilla Rytter Juhl
3. (Japan) Misaki Matsutomo / Ayaka Takahashi
4. (Indonesia) Pia Zebadiah Bernadet / Rizki Amelia Pradipta
5. (China) Bao Yixin / Tang Jinhua
6. (Thailand) Duanganong Aroonkesorn / Kunchala Voravichitchaikul
7. (Hong Kong) Poon Lok Yan / Tse Ying Suet
8. (Indonesia) Aprilsasi Putri Lejarsar Variella / Vita Marissa

=== Top half ===
First Round
1	(China) Wang XL (China) Yu Y	21	21
(South Korea) Go A-r (South Korea) Yoo H-w	17	18
(China) Ma J (China) Zhong QX
(Chinese Taipei) Cheng W-h (Chinese Taipei) Hsieh P-c	w	/	o
5	(China) Bao YX (China) Tang JH	21	22
(Japan) R Kakiiwa (Japan) M Maeda	11	20
(Canada) N Grether (Canada) C Reid	21	21
Q2	(Hong Kong) Ng T Y (Hong Kong) Yeung N T	9	12
3	(Japan) M Matsutomo (Japan) A Takahashi	21	21
(England) G White (England) L Smith	17	13
(Macau) Wang R (Macau) Zhang ZB	14	21	23
(South Korea) Chang Y-n (South Korea) Kim S-h	21	18	21
8	(Indonesia) A P L Variella (Indonesia) V Marissa	21	21
(Singapore) Chen JY (Singapore) Gu J	15	6
(Singapore) S M Sari (Singapore) Yao L	12	23	21
(United States) E Lee (United States) P L Obañana	21	21	7

Second Round
1	(China) Wang XL (China) Yu Y	21	21
(Chinese Taipei) Cheng W-h (Chinese Taipei) Hsieh P-c	16	10
5	(China) Bao YX (China) Tang JH	21	21
(Canada) N Grether (Canada) C Reid	7	14
3	(Japan) M Matsutomo (Japan) A Takahashi	22	25
(Macau) Wang R (Macau) Zhang ZB	20	23
8	(Indonesia) A P L Variella (Indonesia) V Marissa	21	21
(Singapore) S M Sari (Singapore) Yao L	19	14

Quarterfinals
1	(China) Wang XL (China) Yu Y	21	16
5	(China) Bao YX (China) Tang JH	23	21
3	(Japan) M Matsutomo (Japan) A Takahashi	21	21
8	(Indonesia) A P L Variella (Indonesia) V Marissa	18	10

Semifinals
5	(China) Bao YX (China) Tang JH	21	21
3	(Japan) M Matsutomo (Japan) A Takahashi	17	12

=== Bottom half ===
First Round
(Germany) J Goliszewski (Germany) B Michels	23	15
(Thailand) S Amitrapai (Thailand) N Lam	25	21
(Japan) M Aratama (Japan) M Taruno	21	21
6	(Thailand) D Aroonkesorn (Thailand) K Voravichitchaikul	18	6
(China) Ou DN (China) Tang YT	21	21
Q3	(Hong Kong) Wu Y T (Hong Kong) Cheung Y M	11	8
PFQ	(Hong Kong) Chau H W (Hong Kong) Shek H Y	14	13
4	(Indonesia) P Z Bernadet (Indonesia) R A Pradipta	21	21
(Singapore) Fu MT (Singapore) V Neo	21	21
Q4	(Hong Kong) Chan H Y (Hong Kong) Yuen S Y	6	16
(Indonesia) A S Awanda (Indonesia) D D Haris	13	21	21
7	(Hong Kong) Poon L Y (Hong Kong) Tse Y S	21	17	16
(Thailand) P Supajirakul (Thailand) S Taerattanachai	21	21
Q1	(Hong Kong) Ip S T (Hong Kong) Yeung S Y	8	6
(Germany) I Herttrich (Germany) C Nelte	17	10
2	(Denmark) C Pedersen (Denmark) K Rytter Juhl	21	21

Second Round
(Thailand) S Amitrapai (Thailand) N Lam	16	10
(Japan) M Aratama (Japan) M Taruno	21	21
(China) Ou DN (China) Tang YT	21	21
4	(Indonesia) P Z Bernadet (Indonesia) R A Pradipta	19	10
(Singapore) Fu MT (Singapore) V Neo	14	13
(Indonesia) A S Awanda (Indonesia) D D Haris	21	21
(Thailand) P Supajirakul (Thailand) S Taerattanachai	18	17
(Denmark) C Pedersen (Denmark) K Rytter Juhl	21	21

Quarterfinals
(Japan) M Aratama (Japan) M Taruno	12	21	14
(China) Ou DN (China) Tang YT	21	19	21
(Indonesia) A S Awanda (Indonesia) D D Haris	14	13
2	(Denmark) C Pedersen (Denmark) K Rytter Juhl	21	21

Semifinals
(China) Ou DN (China) Tang YT	21	21
2	(Denmark) C Pedersen (Denmark) K Rytter Juhl	13	15

=== Finals ===
Semifinals
5	(China) Bao Yixin (China) Tang Jinhua	21	21
3	(Japan) Misaki Matsutomo (Japan) Ayaka Takahashi	17	12
(China) Ou Dongni (China) Tang Yuanting	21	21
2	(Denmark) Christinna Pedersen (Denmark) Kamilla Rytter Juhl	13	15

Final
5	(China) Bao Yixin (China) Tang Jinhua	18	21	21
(China) Ou Dongni (China) Tang Yuanting	21	16	15

== Mixed doubles ==
=== Seeds ===
1. (China) Zhang Nan / Zhao Yunlei
2. (Indonesia) Tontowi Ahmad / Liliyana Natsir
3. (China) Xu Chen / Ma Jin
4. (Denmark) Joachim Fischer Nielsen / Christinna Pedersen
5. (Malaysia) Chan Peng Soon / Goh Liu Ying
6. (Thailand) Sudket Prapakamol / Saralee Thungthongkam
7. (Indonesia) Praveen Jordan / Vita Marissa
8. (Indonesia) Markis Kido / Pia Zebadiah Bernadet

=== Top half ===
First Round
1	(China) Zhang N (China) Zhao YL	21	21
Q4	(Germany) J Schöttler (Germany) J Goliszewski	13	13
Q3	(Singapore) T Hee (Singapore) Fu MT	21	27
(Indonesia) E Subaktiar (Indonesia) G E Widjaja	17	25
6	(Thailand) S Prapakamol (Thailand) S Thungthongkam	16	15
(Denmark) A Kristiansen (Denmark) J Houmann	21	21
(Japan) H Hashimoto (Japan) M Maeda	21	23
(South Korea) Kim G-j (South Korea) Kim S-y	17	21
PFQ	(England) A Ellis (England) L Smith	21	18	21
Q2	(Singapore) C Triyachart (Singapore) Yao L	19	21	15
(Singapore) D B Chrisnanta (Singapore) V Neo	20	21	16
(England) C Adcock (England) G White	22	18	21
5	(Malaysia) Chan P S (Malaysia) Goh L Y	19	21	21
(Indonesia) M F Gideon (Indonesia) R A Pradipta	21	12	16
(South Korea) Yoo Y-s (South Korea) Chang Y-n	21	22	18
(Germany) M Fuchs (Germany) B Michels	16	24	21

Second Round
1	(China) Zhang N (China) Zhao YL	21	21
Q3	(Singapore) T Hee (Singapore) Fu MT	11	13
(Denmark) A Kristiansen (Denmark) J Houmann	17	21	16
(Japan) H Hashimoto (Japan) M Maeda	21	16	21
PFQ	(England) A Ellis (England) L Smith	16	18
(England) C Adcock (England) G White	21	21
5	(Malaysia) Chan P S (Malaysia) Goh L Y	22	22
(Germany) M Fuchs (Germany) B Michels	20	20

Quarterfinals
1	(China) Zhang N (China) Zhao YL	17	21	22
(Japan) H Hashimoto (Japan) M Maeda	21	10	20
(England) C Adcock (England) G White	21	21
5	(Malaysia) Chan P S (Malaysia) Goh L Y	18	12

Semifinals
1	(China) Zhang N (China) Zhao YL	12	16
(England) C Adcock (England) G White	21	21

=== Bottom half ===
First Round
(Germany) M Schwenger (Germany) C Nelte	21	21
(Hong Kong) Chan Y L (Hong Kong) Tse Y S	16	14
(India) T Kona (India) A Ponnappa	19	21	17
7	(Indonesia) P Jordan (Indonesia) V Marissa	21	19	21
PFQ	(China) Chai B (China) Tang JH	21	16	21
(Japan) K Hayakawa (Japan) M Matsutomo	16	21	16
(Hong Kong) Lee C H (Hong Kong) Chau H W	w	/	o
3	(China) Xu C (China) Ma J
PFQ	(Hong Kong) Wong W H (Hong Kong) Chan H Y	18	21	21
(Singapore) T Zhao (Singapore) S M Sari	21	10	18
Q1	(Hong Kong) Tang C M (Hong Kong) Ng W Y
8	(Indonesia) M Kido (Indonesia) P Z Bernadet	w	/	o
(Germany) P Käsbauer (Germany) I Herttrich	10	15
(Russia) E Dremin (Russia) E Dimova	21	21
(China) Liu C (China) Bao YX	21	21
PFQ	(Thailand) M Jongjit (Thailand) S Taerattanachai	17	15

Second Round
(Germany) M Schwenger (Germany) C Nelte	16	19
7	(Indonesia) P Jordan (Indonesia) V Marissa	21	21
PFQ	(China) Chai B (China) Tang JH	18	17
(Hong Kong) Lee C H (Hong Kong) Chau H W	21	21
PFQ	(Hong Kong) Wong W H (Hong Kong) Chan H Y	17	18
8	(Indonesia) M Kido (Indonesia) P Z Bernadet	21	21
(Russia) E Dremin (Russia) E Dimova	14	21	17
(China) Liu C (China) Bao YX	21	14	21

Quarterfinals
7	(Indonesia) P Jordan (Indonesia) V Marissa	12	21	17
(Hong Kong) Lee C H (Hong Kong) Chau H W	21	18	21
8	(Indonesia) M Kido (Indonesia) P Z Bernadet	15	20
(China) Liu C (China) Bao YX	21	22

Semifinals
(Hong Kong) Lee C H (Hong Kong) Chau W H	21	10	21
(China) Liu C (China) Bao YX	17	21	23

=== Finals ===
Semifinals
1	(China) Zhang Nan (China) Zhao Yunlei	12	16
(England) Chris Adcock (England) Gabrielle White	21	21
(Hong Kong) Lee Chun Hei (Hong Kong) Chau Hoi Wah	21	10	21
(China) Liu Cheng (China) Bao Yixin	17	21	23

Final
(England) Chris Adcock (England) Gabrielle White	21	24
(China) Liu Cheng (China) Bao Yixin	14	22
