= 2013 Korea Open Super Series Premier =

2013 Korea Open Superseries Premier
Tournament details
- Dates: 8 January 2013 – 13 January 2013
- Edition: 23rd
- Level: Super Series Premier
- Total prize money: US$1,000,000
- Venue: Olympic Gymnasium 2
- Location: Seoul, South Korea

Champions
- Men's singles: (Malaysia) Lee Chong Wei
- Women's singles: (South Korea) Sung Ji Hyun
- Men's doubles: (South Korea) Ko Sung Hyun (South Korea) Lee Yong-dae
- Women's doubles: (China) Wang Xiaoli (China) Yu Yang
- Mixed doubles: (China) Zhang Nan (China) Zhao Yunlei

The 2013 Korea Open Superseries Premier was the first super series tournament of the 2013 BWF Super Series. The tournament was held in Seoul, South Korea from January 8–13, 2013 and had a total purse of $1,000,000. A qualification was held to fill four places in all five disciplines of the main draws.

== Men's singles ==
=== Seeds ===
1. (Malaysia) Lee Chong Wei (champion)
2. (China) Chen Long (first round)
3. (China) Chen Jin (first round)
4. (China) Du Pengyu (silver Medalist)
5. (Japan) Kenichi Tago (first round)
6. (Vietnam) Nguyen Tien Minh (first round)
7. (Hong Kong) Hu Yun (quarterfinals)
8. (Japan) Sho Sasaki (withdrew)

=== Top half ===
First round
1	(Malaysia) Lee C W	17	21	21
(China) Wang ZM	21	14	16
(Indonesia) T Sugiarto	21	14	17
(Germany) M Zwiebler	16	21	21
7	(Hong Kong) Hu Y	9	21	21
Q1	(South Korea) Lee D-k	21	19	16
(England) R Ouseph	19	16
(India) P Kashyap	21	21
3	(China) Chen J	21	14	15
PFQ	(China) Gao H	14	21	21
(Sweden) H Hurskainen	22	16
(Malaysia) Chong W F	24	21
6	(Vietnam) Nguyen T M	14	21	12^{r}
(Hong Kong) Wong W K	21	12	18
PFQ	(Thailand) S Avihingsanon	14	9
(Denmark) V Axelsen	21	21

Second round
1	(Malaysia) Lee C W	21	21
(Germany) M Zwiebler	11	19
7	(Hong Kong) Hu Y	16	21	21
(India) P Kashyap	21	13	17
PFQ	(China) Gao H	21	18	15
(Malaysia) Chong W F	14	21	21
(Hong Kong) Wong W K	18	21	21
(Denmark) V Axelsen	21	17	18

Quarterfinals
1	(Malaysia) Lee C W	21	21
7	(Hong Kong) Hu Y	15	17
(Malaysia) Chong W F	5	21	15
(Hong Kong) Wong W K	21	17	21

Semifinals
1	(Malaysia) Lee C W	21	21
(Hong Kong) Wong W K	11	18

=== Bottom half ===
First round
(Russia) V Ivanov	21	21
Q3	(China) Chen YK	19	15
(Denmark) J Ø Jørgensen	21	21
5	(Japan) K Tago	12	18
(Chinese Taipei) Hsu J-h	21	23	21
PFQ	(Hong Kong) Chan Y K	15	25	19
(Chinese Taipei) Chou T-c	7	12
4	(China) Du PY	21	21
(Japan) T Ueda	18	21	21
(Denmark) H-K Vittinghus	21	17	18
Q2	(Thailand) P Poodchalat	14	21	20
PFQ	(Finland) V Lang	21	15	22
(Thailand) B Ponsana	12	21	14
(Indonesia) S D Kuncoro	21	17	21
Q4	(Singapore) Y Z A Chen	4
2	(China) Chen L	11^{r}

Second round
(Russia) V Ivanov	21	22
(Denmark) J Ø Jørgensen	17	20
(Chinese Taipei) Hsu J-h	8	15
4	(China) Du PY	21	21
(Japan) T Ueda	21	21
(Finland) V Lang	10	16
(Indonesia) S D Kuncoro	21	21
Q4	(Singapore) Y Z A Chen	14	13

Quarterfinals
(Russia) V Ivanov	11	8
4	(China) Du PY	21	21
(Japan) T Ueda	17	15
(Indonesia) S D Kuncoro	21	21

Semifinals
4	(China) Du PY	21	21
(Indonesia) S D Kuncoro	12	17

=== Finals ===
Semifinals
1	(Malaysia) Lee Chong Wei	21	21
(Hong Kong) Wong Wing Ki	11	18
4	(China) Du Pengyu	21	21
(Indonesia) Sony Dwi Kuncoro	12	17

Final
1	(Malaysia) Lee Chong Wei	21	21
4	(China) Du Pengyu	12	15

== Women's singles ==
=== Seeds ===
1. (China) Li Xuerui (first round)
2. (China) Wang Yihan (first round)
3. (India) Saina Nehwal (quarter-final)
4. (Germany) Juliane Schenk (second round)
5. (China) Wang Shixian (finals)
6. (Thailand) Ratchanok Inthanon (first round)
7. (China) Jiang Yanjiao (second round)
8. (Denmark) Tine Baun (second round)

=== Top half ===
First round
1	(China) Li XR	7^{r}
(Thailand) P Buranaprasertsuk	7
(Indonesia) L Fanetri	20	16
(India) P. V. Sindhu	22	21
7	(China) Jiang YJ	21	21
(Indonesia) A Firdasari	13	13
(South Korea) Sung J-h	21	21
Q2	(South Korea) Lee M-j	11	17
3	(India) S Nehwal	17	21	21
(Thailand) S Taerattanachai	21	9	19
(Bulgaria) P Nedelcheva	21	19	13
(Singapore) Fu MT	18	21	21
6	(Thailand) R Inthanon	21	20	17
(Chinese Taipei) Tai T-y	13	22	21
(China) Han L	21	16	21
(Hong Kong) Yip P Y	10	21	16

Second round
(Thailand) P Buranaprasertsuk	21	21
(India) P. V. Sindhu	19	13
7	(China) Jiang YJ	10	17
(South Korea) Sung J-h	21	21
3	(India) S Nehwal	21	21
(Singapore) Fu MT	16	9
(Chinese Taipei) Tai T-y	16	16
(China) Han L	21	21

Quarterfinals
(Thailand) P Buranaprasertsuk	13	7
(South Korea) Sung J-h	21	21
3	(India) S Nehwal	14	21	12
(China) Han L	21	15	12

Semifinals
(South Korea) Sung J-h	21	21
(China) Han L	14	17

=== Bottom half ===
First round
(Thailand) B Ongbumrungpan	9	11
(Japan) M Mitani	21	21
Q3	(South Korea) Kim H-m	13	16
8	(Denmark) T Baun	21	21
(Thailand) N Jindapon	21	21
(Chinese Taipei) Cheng S-c	16	14
(Chinese Taipei) Pai H-m	17	13
4	(Germany) J Schenk	21	21
Q4	(Chinese Taipei) Hsu Y-c	18	15
(Hong Kong) Chan T K	21	21
Q1	(South Korea) Lee J-m	13	16
5	(China) Wang SX	21	21
(Japan) E Hirose	18	15
(Singapore) Gu J	21	21
(South Korea) Bae Y-j	21	9
2	(China) Wang YH	11	18^{r}

Second round
(Japan) M Mitani	19	21	21
8	(Denmark) T Baun	21	16	18
(Thailand) N Jindapon	21	21
4	(Germany) J Schenk	19	8
(Hong Kong) Chan T K	9	16
5	(China) Wang SX	21	21
(Singapore) Gu J	21	22	19
(South Korea) Bae Y-j	15	24	21

Quarterfinals
(Japan) M Mitani	24	22
(Thailand) N Jindapon	22	20
5	(China) Wang SX	21	21
(South Korea) Bae Y-j	18	9

Semifinals
(Japan) M Mitani	11	17
5	(China) Wang SX	21	21

=== Finals ===
Semifinals
(South Korea) Sung Ji-hyun	21	21
(China) Han Li	14	17
(Japan) Minatsu Mitani	11	17
5	(China) Wang Shixian	21	21

Final
(South Korea) Sung Ji-hyun	21	22
5	(China) Wang Shixian	12	20

== Men's doubles ==
=== Seeds ===
1. (Denmark) Mathias Boe / Carsten Mogensen
2. (Malaysia) Koo Kien Keat / Tan Boon Heong
3. (China) Cai Yun / Fu Haifeng
4. (Japan) Hiroyuki Endo / Kenichi Hayakawa
5. (South Korea) Kim Ki-jung / Kim Sa-rang
6. (South Korea) Ko Sung-hyun / Lee Yong-dae
7. (China) Hong Wei / Shen Ye
8. (Japan) Hirokatsu Hashimoto / Noriyasu Hirata

=== Top half ===
First round
1	(Denmark) M Boe (Denmark) C Mogensen	21	21
(Thailand) S Anugritayawon (Thailand) S Prapakamol	10	12
(Germany) I Kindervater (Germany) J Schöttler	21	23
(Denmark) C J Skovgård (Denmark) M Pieler Kolding	19	21
5	(South Korea) Kim K-j (South Korea) Kim S-r	21	21
(Indonesia) M Ahsan (Indonesia) H Setiawan	19	19
(China) Chai B (China) Zhang N	21	21
(Indonesia) Y S Dasaki (Indonesia) H A Gunawan	12	12
3	(China) Cai Y (China) Fu HF	4^{r}
(Chinese Taipei) Lee S-m (Chinese Taipei) Tsai C-h	11
(Malaysia) M Z A Latif (Malaysia) M F M Tazari	14	18
(Thailand) P Chalardchaleam (Thailand) N Puangpuapech	21	21
7	(China) Hong W (China) Shen Y	21	21
(Germany) M Fuchs (Germany) O Roth	13	12
(Indonesia) A Y Chandra (Indonesia) M Kido	13	15
(Russia) V Ivanov (Russia) I Sozonov	21	21

Second round
1	(Denmark) M Boe (Denmark) C Mogensen	21	21
(Germany) I Kindervater (Germany) J Schöttler	11	14
5	(South Korea) Kim K-j (South Korea) Kim S-r	21	21
(China) Chai B (China) Zhang N	14	14
(Chinese Taipei) Lee S-m (Chinese Taipei) Tsai C-h	25	15	21
(Thailand) P Chalardchaleam (Thailand) N Puangpuapech	23	21	9
7	(China) Hong W (China) Shen Y	21	21
(Russia) V Ivanov (Russia) I Sozonov	12	19

Quarterfinals
1	(Denmark) M Boe (Denmark) C Mogensen	21	21
5	(South Korea) Kim K-j (South Korea) Kim S-r	15	10
(Chinese Taipei) Lee S-m (Chinese Taipei) Tsai C-h	21	23	18
7	(China) Hong W (China) Shen Y	18	25	21

Semifinals
1	(Denmark) M Boe (Denmark) C Mogensen	19	21	21
7	(China) Hong W (China) Shen Y	21	10	18

=== Bottom half ===
First round
(Denmark) R Bonde (Denmark) M Conrad-Petersen	21	7
(England) C Adcock (England) A Ellis	18	5^{r}
Q1	(Scotland) R Blair (Malaysia) Tan B S	13	14
6	(South Korea) Ko S-h (South Korea) Lee Y-d	21	21
Q3	(South Korea) Cho G-w (South Korea) Kim D-e	21	13	17
(Malaysia) Goh V S (Malaysia) Lim K W	15	21	21
(Malaysia) Hoon T H (Malaysia) Tan W K	12	22	14
4	(Japan) H Endo (Japan) K Hayakawa	21	20	21
(China) Liu XL (China) Qiu ZH	21	21
(England) C Langridge (England) P Mills	16	16
(England) M Ellis (Scotland) P Van Rietvelde	8	12
8	(Japan) H Hashimoto (Japan) N Hirata	21	21
(Malaysia) Gan T C (Malaysia) Ong S H	21	24
Q2	(South Korea) Kim J-h (South Korea) Kim J-h	10	22
Q4	(South Korea) Kang J-w (South Korea) Lee S-j	13	17
2	(Malaysia) Koo K K (Malaysia) Tan B H	21	21

Second round
(Denmark) R Bonde (Denmark) M Conrad-Petersen	14	14
6	(South Korea) Ko S-h (South Korea) Lee Y-d	21	21
(Malaysia) Goh V S (Malaysia) Lim K W	21	21
4	(Japan) H Endo (Japan) K Hayakawa	13	15
(China) Liu XL (China) Qiu ZH	21	21
8	(Japan) H Hashimoto (Japan) N Hirata	10	13
(Malaysia) Gan T C (Malaysia) Ong S H	14	17
2	(Malaysia) Koo K K (Malaysia) Tan B H	21	21

Quarterfinals
6	(South Korea) Ko S-h (South Korea) Lee Y-d	21	21
(Malaysia) Goh V S (Malaysia) Lim K W	16	10
(China) Liu XL (China) Qiu ZH	12	19
2	(Malaysia) Koo K K (Malaysia) Tan B H	21	21

Semifinals
6	(South Korea) Ko S-h (South Korea) Lee Y-d	21	21
2	(Malaysia) Koo K K (Malaysia) Tan B H	17	11

=== Finals ===
Semifinals
1	(Denmark) Mathias Boe (Denmark) Carsten Mogensen	19	21	21
7	(China) Hong Wei (China) Shen Ye	21	10	18
6	(South Korea) Ko Sung-hyun (South Korea) Lee Yong-dae	21	21
2	(Malaysia) Koo Kien Keat (Malaysia) Tan Boon Heong	17	11

Final
1	(Denmark) Mathias Boe (Denmark) Carsten Mogensen	21	13	10
6	(South Korea) Ko Sung-hyun (South Korea) Lee Yong-dae	19	21	21

== Women's doubles ==
=== Seeds ===
1. (China) Wang Xiaoli / Yu Yang
2. (Denmark) Christinna Pedersen / Kamilla Rytter Juhl
3. (Japan) Misaki Matsutomo / Ayaka Takahashi
4. (South Korea) Jung Kyung-eun / Kim Ha-na
5. (China) Bao Yixin / Tian Qing
6. (China) Cheng Shu / Zhao Yunlei
7. (China) Ma Jin / Tang Jinhua
8. (Thailand) Duanganong Aroonkesorn / Kunchala Voravichitchaikul

=== Top half ===
First round
1	(China) Wang XL (China) Yu Y	21	21
(South Korea) Ra K-a (South Korea) Won Y-h	10	14
(Japan) R Kakiiwa (Japan) M Maeda	21	21
(Bulgaria) P Nedelcheva (Bulgaria) D Popstoikova	15	16
6	(China) Cheng S (China) Zhao YL	21	21
(Thailand) S Amitrapai (Thailand) S Taerattanachai	11	18
Q2	(South Korea) Han G-h (South Korea) Kim H-r	23	21
PFQ	(Chinese Taipei) Hung S-c (Chinese Taipei) Wu F-c	21	9
4	(South Korea) Jung K-e (South Korea) Kim H-n	21	25
(Scotland) J Cooper (Scotland) K Gilmour	9	23
(Malaysia) Goh L Y (Malaysia) Lim Y L	9	20
(Indonesia) A P L Variella (Indonesia) V Marissa	21	22
5	(China) Bao YX (China) Tian Q	21	21
(Indonesia) S R Andini (Indonesia) D D Haris	8	14
(England) H Olver (England) K Robertshaw	17	19
Q4	(South Korea) Chae Y-j (South Korea) Yang R-s	21	21

Second round
1	(China) Wang XL (China) Yu Y	21	21
(Japan) R Kakiiwa (Japan) M Maeda	14	12
6	(China) Cheng S (China) Zhao YL	21	21
Q4	(South Korea) Han G-h (South Korea) Kim H-r	6	8
4	(South Korea) Jung K-y (South Korea) Kim H-n	21	21
(Indonesia) A P L Variella (Indonesia) V Marissa	14	12
5	(China) Bao YX (China) Tian Q	21	21
(South Korea) Chae Y-j (South Korea) Yang R-s	18	10

Quarterfinals
1	(China) Wang XL (China) Yu Y	w	/	o
6	(China) Cheng S (China) Zhao YL
4	(South Korea) Jung K-e (South Korea) Kim H-n	21	21
5	(China) Bao YX (China) Tian Q	11	18

Semifinals
1	(China) Wang XL (China) Yu Y	21	21
4	(South Korea) Jung K-e (South Korea) Kim H-n	16	11

=== Bottom half ===
First round
Q3	(South Korea) Kim C-m (South Korea) Kim J-w	21	19	21
(Germany) J Goliszewski (Germany) B Michels	12	21	15
(Chinese Taipei) Cheng W-h (Chinese Taipei) Hsieh P-c	12	14
7	(China) Ma J (China) Tang JH	21	21
(Hong Kong) Poon L Y (Hong Kong) Tse Y S	17	17
(Indonesia) M Jauhari (Indonesia) G Polii	21	21
(Russia) T Bibik (Russia) A Chervaikova	9	11
3	(Japan) M Matsutomo (Japan) A Takahashi	21	21
(South Korea) Choi H-i (South Korea) Kim S-y	w	/	o
Q1
(Chinese Taipei) Chiang K-h (Chinese Taipei) Tsai P-l	12	16
8	(Thailand) D Aroonkesorn (Thailand) K Voravichitchaikul	21	21
(Thailand) N Lam (Thailand) S Thoungthongkam	15	17
(South Korea) Lee S-h (South Korea) Shin S-c	21	21
(Indonesia) P Z Bernadeth (Indonesia) R A Pradipta	21	16	11
2	(Denmark) C Pedersen (Denmark) K Rytter Juhl	15	21	21

Second round
Q3	(South Korea) Kim C-m (South Korea) Kim J-w	4	15
7	(China) Ma J (China) Tang JH	21	21
(Indonesia) M Jauhari (Indonesia) G Polii	22	9	5
3	(Japan) M Matsutomo (Japan) A Takahashi	20	21	21
(South Korea) Choi H-i (South Korea) Kim S-y	18	18
8	(Thailand) D Aroonkesorn (Thailand) K Voravichitchaikul	21	21
(South Korea) Lee S-h (South Korea) Shin S-c	21	14	14
2	(Denmark) C Pedersen (Denmark) K Rytter Juhl	15	21	21

Quarterfinals
7	(China) Ma J (China) Tang JH	21	18	21
3	(Japan) M Matsutomo (Japan) A Takahashi	19	21	14
8	(Thailand) D Aroonkesorn (Thailand) K Voravichitchaikul	16	17
2	(Denmark) C Pedersen (Denmark) K Rytter Juhl	21	21

Semifinals
7	(China) Ma J (China) Tang JH	21	19	21
2	(Denmark) C Pedersen (Denmark) K Rytter Juhl	19	21	11

=== Finals ===
Semifinals
1	(China) Wang Xiaoli (China) Yu Yang	21	21
4	(South Korea) Jung Kyung-eun (South Korea) Kim Ha-na	16	11
7	(China) Ma Jin (China) Tang Jinhua	21	19	21
2	(Denmark) Christinna Pedersen (Denmark) Kamilla Rytter Juhl	19	21	11

Final
1	(China) Wang Xiaoli (China) Yu Yang	21	21
7	(China) Ma Jin (China) Tang Jinhua	17	13

== Mixed doubles ==
=== Seeds ===
1. (China) Xu Chen / Ma Jin
2. (Indonesia) Tantowi Ahmad / Lilyana Natsir
3. (Malaysia) Chan Peng Soon / Goh Liu Ying
4. (China) Zhang Nan / Zhao Yunlei
5. (Thailand) Sudket Prapakamol / Saralee Thoungthongkam
6. (Denmark) Joachim Fischer Nielsen / Christinna Pedersen
7. (Indonesia) Muhammad Rijal / Debby Susanto
8. (Poland) Robert Mateusiak / Nadiezda Zieba

=== Top half ===
First round
1	(China) Xu C (China) Ma J	21	21
Q4	(South Korea) Lee S-j (South Korea) Kim S-y	16	12
(Chinese Taipei) Lee S-m (Chinese Taipei) Cheng W-h	12	18
(Germany) M Fuchs (Germany) B Michels	21	21
8	(Poland) R Mateusiak (Poland) N Zieba	21	25
(Denmark) A Kristiansen (Denmark) J Houmann	13	23
(England) C Adcock (England) G White	21	21
(Malaysia) Ong J G (Malaysia) Lim Y L	18	12
3	(Malaysia) Chan P S (Malaysia) Goh L Y	21	21
(Germany) O Roth (Germany) J Goliszewski	15	12
(Australia) L Chong (Australia) V Na	12	12
(Indonesia) M Kido (Indonesia) P Z Bernadeth	21	21
5	(Thailand) S Prapakamol (Thailand) S Thoungthongkam	21	21
(Scotland) R Blair (Scotland) J Cooper	14	17
(England) C Langridge (England) H Olver	18	14
(China) Qiu ZH (China) Bao YX	21	21

Second round
1	(China) Xu C (China) Ma J	21	21
(Germany) M Fuchs (Germany) B Michels	16	17
8	(Poland) R Mateusiak (Poland) N Zieba	22	19	15
(England) C Adcock (England) G White	20	21	21
3	(Malaysia) Chan P S (Malaysia) Goh L Y	21	15	13
(Indonesia) M Kido (Indonesia) P Z Bernadeth	12	21	21
5	(Thailand) S Prapakamol (Thailand) S Thoungthongkam	11	21	21
(China) Qiu ZH (China) Bao YX	21	16	16

Quarterfinals
1	(China) Xu C (China) Ma J	21	21
(England) C Adcock (England) G White	13	17
(Indonesia) M Kido (Indonesia) P Z Bernadeth	21	8	18
5	(Thailand) S Prapakamol (Thailand) S Thoungthongkam	17	21	21

Semifinals
1	(China) Xu C (China) Ma J	21	21
5	(Thailand) S Prapakamol (Thailand) S Thoungthongkam	12	14

=== Bottom half ===
First round
(South Korea) Kim K-j (South Korea) Jung K-e	15	22	21
(Singapore) D B Chrisnanta (Singapore) Y Y V Neo	21	20	16
Q1	(Indonesia) P Jordan (Indonesia) V Marissa	15	16
7	(Indonesia) M Rijal (Indonesia) D Susanto	21	21
(Russia) V Durkin (Russia) N Vislova	21	21	21
Q2	(South Korea) Kim D-e (South Korea) Ko A-r	13	23	16
(Denmark) M Pieler Kolding (Denmark) K Rytter Juhl	12	10
4	(China) Zhang N (China) Zhao YL	21	21
(Thailand) S Anugritayawon (Thailand) K Voravichitchaikul	14	15
(South Korea) Shin B-c (South Korea) Eom H-w	21	21
(Thailand) N Puangpuapech (Thailand) S Amitrapai	21	13	15
6	(Denmark) J Fischer Nielsen (Denmark) C Pedersen	8	21	21
Q3	(Japan) H Hashimoto (Japan) M Maeda	16	17
(Japan) K Hayakawa (Japan) M Matsutomo	21	21
(England) M Ellis (England) A Lim	6	16
2	(Indonesia) T Ahmad (Indonesia) L Natsir	21	21

Second round
(South Korea) Kim K-j (South Korea) Jung K-e	22	21
(Indonesia) M Rijal (Indonesia) D Susanto	20	14
(Russia) V Durkin (Russia) N Vislova	21	13	15
4	(China) Zhang N (China) Zhao YL	19	21	21
(South Korea) Shin B-c (South Korea) Eom H-w	18	16
6	(Denmark) J Fischer Nielsen (Denmark) C Pedersen	21	21
(Japan) K Hayakawa (Japan) M Matsutomo	4	11
2	(Indonesia) T Ahmad (Indonesia) L Natsir	21	21

Quarterfinals
(South Korea) Kim K-j (South Korea) Jung K-e	7	13
4	(China) Zhang N (China) Zhao YL	21	21
6	(Denmark) J Fischer Nielsen (Denmark) C Pedersen	21	22
2	(Indonesia) T Ahmad (Indonesia) L Natsir	19	20

Semifinals
4	(China) Zhang N (China) Zhao YL	21	21
6	(Denmark) J Fischer Nielsen (Denmark) C Pedersen	16	3

=== Finals ===
Semifinals
1	(China) Xu Chen (China) Ma Jin	21	21
5	(Thailand) Sudket Prapakamol (Thailand) Saralee Thoungthongkam	12	14
4	(China) Zhang Nan (China) Zhao Yunlei	21	21
6	(Denmark) Joachim Fischer Nielsen (Denmark) Christinna Pedersen	16	3

Final
1	(China) Xu Chen (China) Ma Jin	21	16	13
4	(China) Zhang Nan (China) Zhao Yunlei	13	21	21

Preceded by 2012 Korea Open Super Series Premier	Korea Open	Succeeded by 2014 Korea Open Super Series
Preceded by 2012 BWF Super Series Masters Finals	BWF Super Series; 2013 season	Succeeded by 2013 Malaysia Super Series
