= 2013 Denmark Super Series Premier =

Tournament details
- Dates: October 15, 2013 - October 20, 2013
- Total prize money: US$400,000
- Venue: Odense Sports Park
- Location: Odense, Denmark

The 2013 Denmark Super Series Premier is the ninth super series tournament of the 2013 BWF Super Series. The tournament was held in Odense, Denmark from October 15–20, 2013 and had a total purse of $400,000. A qualification was held to fill four places in three of the five disciplines of the main draws.

== Men's singles ==
=== Seeds ===
1. (Malaysia) Lee Chong Wei (final)
2. (China) Chen Long (champion)
3. (China) Du Pengyu (semi-finals)
4. (Japan) Kenichi Tago (second round)
5. (Denmark) Jan Ø. Jørgensen (quarter-finals)
6. (Vietnam) Nguyễn Tiến Minh (first round)
7. (Indonesia) Tommy Sugiarto (second round)
8. (Thailand) Boonsak Ponsana (first round)

=== Top half ===
First Round
1	(Malaysia) Lee C W	21	21
Q4	(South Korea) Lee D-k	11	8
(Germany) M Zwiebler	13	20
(Denmark) V Axelsen	21	22
5	(Denmark) J Ø Jørgensen	21	18	21
(Japan) T Ueda	19	21	13
(India) P Kashyap	11
(Malaysia) Liew DR	4^{r}
3	(China) Du PY	21	19	21
(Chinese Taipei) Chou T-c	12	21	12
(Hong Kong) Wong W K	14	21	16
(Netherlands) E Pang	21	15	21
8	(Thailand) B Ponsana	11	14
(India) A Jayaram	21	21
(Hong Kong) Hu Y	17	14
(India) G Dutt	21	21

Second Round
1	(Malaysia) Lee C W	21	21
(Denmark) V Axelsen	11	17
5	(Denmark) J Ø Jørgensen	21	21
(India) P Kashyap	11	15
3	(China) Du PY	21	21
(Netherlands) E Pang	17	11
(India) A Jayaram	15	16
(India) G Dutt	21	21

Quarterfinals
1	(Malaysia) Lee C W	8	21	21
5	(Denmark) J Ø Jørgensen	21	18	5
3	(China) Du PY	21	21
(India) G Dutt	11	19

Semifinals
1	(Malaysia) Lee C W	20	21	21
3	(China) Du PY	22	6	15

=== Bottom half ===
First Round
(Denmark) H-K Vittinghus	21	16	18
(Thailand) T Saensomboonsuk	17	21	21
(Malaysia) Chong W F	19	21	21
6	(Vietnam) Nguyễn T M	21	18	7
(Indonesia) S D Kuncoro	21	21
Q2	(Estonia) R Must	13	12
(China) Wang ZM	21	18	18
4	(Japan) K Tago	11	21	21
(China) Chen YK	21	17	21
(Indonesia) D H Rumbaka	14	21	17
Q3	(Japan) K Momota	18	8
7	(Indonesia) T Sugiarto	21	21
(Japan) S Sasaki	14	15
(England) R Ouseph	21	21
Q1	(India) A Pawar	11	6
2	(China) Chen L	21	21

Second Round
(Thailand) T Saensomboonsuk	15	21	21
(Malaysia) Chong W F	21	17	17
(Indonesia) S D Kuncoro	21	21
4	(Japan) K Tago	16	18
(China) Chen YK	22	21
7	(Indonesia) T Sugiarto	20	11
(England) R Ouseph	21	20	16
2	(China) Chen L	19	22	21

Quarterfinals
(Thailand) T Saensomboonsuk	21	21
(Indonesia) S D Kuncoro	16	11
(China) Chen YK	18	17
2	(China) Chen L	21	21

Semifinals
(Thailand) T Saensomboonsuk	18	13
2	(China) Chen L	21	21

=== Finals ===
Semifinals
1	(Malaysia) Lee Chong Wei	20	21	21
3	(China) Du Pengyu	22	6	15
(Thailand) Tanongsak Saensomboonsuk	18	13
2	(China) Chen Long	21	21

Final
1	(Malaysia) Lee Chong Wei	22	19
2	(China) Chen Long	24	21

== Women's singles ==
=== Seeds ===
1. (China) Li Xuerui
2. (Thailand) Ratchanok Intanon
3. (Germany) Juliane Schenk
4. (India) Saina Nehwal
5. (China) Wang Yihan
6. (South Korea) Sung Ji-hyun
7. (China) Wang Shixian
8. (Chinese Taipei) Tai Tzu-ying

=== Top half ===
First Round
1	(China) Li XR	21	21
(India) A Pantawane	17	15
(Russia) K Polikarpova	13	9
(China) Yu S	21	21
7	(China) Wang SX	21	11
(Hong Kong) Yip P Y	15	5^{r}
(Thailand) P Buranaprasertsuk	10	21	17
Q3	(China) Wang X	21	13	21
4	(India) S Nehwal	21	21
(Bulgaria) S Stoeva	16	12
Q2	(Denmark) S-M Jensen	18	21	10
(Scotland) K Gilmour	21	15	21
6	(South Korea) Sung J-h	21	21
Q1	(Denmark) M Blichfeldt	3	15
(Japan) S Takahashi	23	11^{r}
(Hong Kong) Chan T K	21	13

Second Round
1	(China) Li XR	21	21
(China) Yu S	10	13
7	(China) Wang SX	21	21
Q3	(China) Wang X	16	15
4	(India) S Nehwal	21	21
(Scotland) K Gilmour	12	7
6	(South Korea) Sung J-h	21	21
(Hong Kong) Chan T K	10	14

Quarterfinals
1	(China) Li XR
7	(China) Wang SX	w	/	o
4	(India) S Nehwal	21	18	19
6	(South Korea) Sung J-h	13	21	21

Semifinals
7	(China) Wang SX	19	14
6	(South Korea) Sung J-h	21	21

=== Bottom half ===
First Round
(Singapore) Chen JY	16	20
(Denmark) L Kjærsfeldt	21	22
(Indonesia) L Fanetri	13	11
5	(China) Wang YH	21	21
(South Korea) Bae Y-j	20	21	21
(Japan) M Mitani	22	16	7
(China) Han L	21	17	19
3	(Germany) J Schenk	17	21	21
(Japan) E Hirose	21	22
(India) P. V. Sindhu	19	20
(Singapore) Gu J	23	21
8	(Chinese Taipei) Tai T-y	21	11
(Czech Republic) K Gavnholt	21	19	21
Q4	(Denmark) A T Madsen	13	21	18
(New Zealand) M Chan	9	11
2	(Thailand) R Intanon	21	21

Second Round
(Denmark) L Kjærsfeldt	13	13
5	(China) Wang YH	21	21
(South Korea) Bae Y-j	19	21	21
3	(Germany) J Schenk	21	17	17
(Japan) E Hirose	21	22	22
(Singapore) Gu J	16	24	20
(Czech Republic) K Gavnholt	12	17
2	(Thailand) R Intanon	21	21

Quarterfinals
5	(China) Wang YH	21	21
(South Korea) Bae Y-j	17	19
(Japan) E Hirose	22	21	12
2	(Thailand) R Intanon	24	18	21

Semifinals
5	(China) Wang YH	21	21	21
2	(Thailand) R Intanon	23	19	17

=== Finals ===
Semifinals
7	(China) Wang Shixian	19	14
6	(South Korea) Sung Ji-hyun	21	21
5	(China) Wang Yihan	21	21	21
2	(Thailand) Ratchanok Intanon	23	19	17

Final
6	(South Korea) Sung Ji-hyun	21	18	20
5	(China) Wang Yihan	16	21	22

== Men's doubles ==
=== Seeds ===
1. (Indonesia) Mohammad Ahsan / Hendra Setiawan
2. (Denmark) Mathias Boe / Carsten Mogensen
3. (Japan) Hiroyuki Endo / Kenichi Hayakawa
4. (Malaysia) Koo Kien Keat / Tan Boon Heong
5. (China) Liu Xiaolong / Qiu Zihan
6. (South Korea) Kim Gi-jung / Kim Sa-rang
7. (South Korea) Ko Sung-hyun / Shin Baek-cheol
8. (South Korea) Lee Yong-dae / Yoo Yeon-seong

=== Top half ===
First Round
(Poland) A Cwałina (Poland) P Wacha	18	17
(Indonesia) M F Gideon (Indonesia) M Kido	21	21
7	(South Korea) Ko S-h (South Korea) Shin B-c	21	22	22
(Indonesia) A Pratama (Indonesia) R A Saputro	19	24	20
(Germany) P Käsbauer (Germany) J Zurwonne	8	13
(Japan) H Hashimoto (Japan) N Hirata	21	21
3	(Japan) H Endo (Japan) K Hayakawa	21	21
(Denmark) N Nøhr (Denmark) N Overgaard	17	9
(England) C Langridge (England) P Mills	22	17
(Malaysia) Hoon T H (Malaysia) Tan W K	24	21
5	(China) Liu XL (China) Qiu ZH	w	/	o
(Hong Kong) Chan Y L (Hong Kong) Lee C H
(China) Cai Y (China) Chai B	11
(Denmark) K Antonsen (Denmark) O Babic	8^{r}

Second Round
1	(Indonesia) M Ahsan (Indonesia) H Setiawan	21	21
(Indonesia) M F Gideon (Indonesia) M Kido	17	18
7	(South Korea) Ko S-h (South Korea) Shin B-c	12	21	19
(Japan) H Hashimoto (Japan) N Hirata	21	17	21
3	(Japan) H Endo (Japan) K Hayakawa	23	21
(Malaysia) Hoon T H (Malaysia) Tan W K	21	11
5	(China) Liu XL (China) Qiu ZH	20	14
(China) Cai Y (China) Chai B	22	21

Quarterfinals
1	(Indonesia) M Ahsan (Indonesia) H Setiawan	18	21	21
(Japan) H Hashimoto (Japan) N Hirata	21	17	13
3	(Japan) H Endo (Japan) K Hayakawa	21	21
(China) Cai Y (China) Chai B	16	16

Semifinals
1	(Indonesia) M Ahsan (Indonesia) H Setiawan	27	23
3	(Japan) H Endo (Japan) K Hayakawa	25	21

=== Bottom half ===
First Round
(England) C Adcock (England) A Ellis	21	17
(Denmark) K Astrup (Denmark) A Skaarup Rasmussen	21	21
(Denmark) M Conrad-Petersen (Denmark) M Pieler Kolding	21	13	15
8	(South Korea) Lee Y-d (South Korea) Yoo Y-s	16	21	21
(Germany) M Fuchs (Germany) J Schöttler	21	21
(India) M Attri (India) B Sumeeth Reddy	14	14
(Netherlands) R Bosch (Netherlands) K Ridder	15	14
4	(Malaysia) Koo K K (Malaysia) Tan B H	21	21
(Denmark) S Gravholt (Denmark) F Søgaard	15	16
(Japan) T Kamura (Japan) K Sonoda	21	21
(China) Fu FH (China) Hong W	9	21	21
6	(South Korea) Kim G-j (South Korea) Kim S-r	21	16	12
(Denmark) M Christiansen (Denmark) D Daugaard	21	19	12
(Poland) Ł Moren (Poland) W Szkudlarczyk	18	21	21
(New Zealand) K Dennerly-Minturn (New Zealand) O Leydon-Davis	10	15
2	(Denmark) M Boe (Denmark) C Mogensen	21	21

Second Round
(Denmark) K Astrup (Denmark) A Skaarup Rasmussen	19	7
(South Korea) Lee Y-d (South Korea) Yoo Y-s	21	21
(Germany) M Fuchs (Germany) J Schöttler	14	19
4	(Malaysia) Koo K K (Malaysia) Tan B H	21	21
(Japan) T Kamura (Japan) K Sonoda	13	17
(China) Fu HF (China) Hong W	21	21
(Poland) Ł Moren (Poland) W Szkudlarczyk	14	14
2	(Denmark) M Boe (Denmark) C Mogensen	21	21

Quarterfinals
8	(South Korea) Lee Y-d (South Korea) Yoo Y-s	21	21
4	(Malaysia) Koo K K (Malaysia) Tan B H	15	12
(China) Fu HF (China) Hong W	11	18
2	(Denmark) M Boe (Denmark) C Mogensen	21	21

Semifinals
8	(South Korea) Lee Y-d (South Korea) Yoo Y-s	21	21
2	(Denmark) M Boe (Denmark) C Mogensen	18	13

=== Finals ===
Semifinals
1	(Indonesia) Mohammad Ahsan (Indonesia) Hendra Setiawan	27	23
3	(Japan) Hiroyuki Endo (Japan) Kenichi Hayakawa	25	21
8	(South Korea) Lee Yong-dae (South Korea) Yoo Yeon-seong	21	21
2	(Denmark) Mathias Boe (Denmark) Carsten Mogensen	18	13

Final
1	(Indonesia) Mohammad Ahsan (Indonesia) Hendra Setiawan	19	16
8	(South Korea) Lee Yong-dae (South Korea) Yoo Yeon-seong	21	21

== Women's doubles ==
=== Seeds ===
1. (China) Wang Xiaoli / Yu Yang
2. (Denmark) Christinna Pedersen / Kamilla Rytter Juhl
3. (Japan) Misaki Matsutomo / Ayaka Takahashi
4. (South Korea) Jung Kyung-eun / Kim Ha-na
5. (Indonesia) Pia Zebadiah Bernadet / Rizki Amelia Pradipta
6. (China) Ma Jin / Zhong Qianxin
7. (Thailand) Duanganong Aroonkesorn / Kunchala Voravichitchaikul
8. (Indonesia) Nitya Krishinda Maheswari / Greysia Polii

=== Top half ===
First Round
1	(China) Wang XL (China) Yu Y	w	/	o
(India) J Gutta (India) A Ponnappa
(Denmark) E Furbo (Denmark) K Hartwig Nielsen	12	13
(Hong Kong) Poon L Y (Hong Kong) Tse Y S	21	21
8	(Indonesia) N K Maheswari (Indonesia) G Polii	21	18	18
(China) Bao YX (China) Tang JH	19	21	21
(Scotland) J Cooper (Scotland) K Gilmour	11	21	21
(Germany) I Herttrich (Germany) C Nelte	21	16	13
3	(Japan) M Matsutomo (Japan) A Takahashi	21	21
(Denmark) L Grebak (Denmark) M Helsbøl	9	14
(Denmark) I Bergstein (Denmark) Z Dam Larsen	6	6
(Thailand) S Amitrapai (Thailand) N Lam	21	21
7	(Thailand) D Aroonkesorn (Thailand) K Voravichitchaikul	21	21
(Denmark) C Martens (Denmark) M Sejr Nielsen	17	13
(Denmark) C Juel (Denmark) J van Zaane	w	/	o
(South Korea) Eom H-w (South Korea) Shin S-c

Second Round
1	(China) Wang XL (China) Yu Y	19	21	21
(Hong Kong) Poon L Y (Hong Kong) Tse Y S	21	12	16
(China) Bao YX (China) Tang JH	21	21
(Scotland) J Cooper (Scotland) K Gilmour	11	10
3	(Japan) M Matsutomo (Japan) A Takahashi	21	21
(Thailand) S Amitrapai (Thailand) N Lam	14	11
7	(Thailand) D Aroonkesorn (Thailand) K Voravichitchaikul	21	21
(Denmark) C Juel (Denmark) J van Zaane	10	14

Quarterfinals
1	(China) Wang XL (China) Yu Y
(China) Bao YX (China) Tang JH	w	/	o
3	(Japan) M Matsutomo (Japan) A Takahashi	21	21
7	(Thailand) D Aroonkesorn (Thailand) K Voravichitchaikul	14	14

Semifinals
(China) Bao YX (China) Tang JH	19	21	21
3	(Japan) M Matsutomo (Japan) A Takahashi	21	15	15

=== Bottom half ===
First Round
(Indonesia) G R Imawan (Indonesia) T R Nuraidah	13	15
(Japan) R Kakiiwa (Japan) M Maeda	21	21
(Denmark) J Finne-Ipsen (Denmark) R S Hansen	15	10
5	(Indonesia) P Z Bernadet (Indonesia) R A Pradipta	21	21
(South Korea) Chang Y-n (South Korea) Ko S-y	21	21
(Bulgaria) G Stoeva (Bulgaria) S Stoeva	7	5
(Denmark) M Fruergaard (Denmark) S Thygesen	10	12
4	(South Korea) Jung K-e (South Korea) Kim H-n	21	21
(England) H Olver (England) K Robertshaw	21	16	12
(Denmark) L Damkjær Kruse (Denmark) M Rœpke	17	21	21
(Russia) I Khlebko (Russia) K Polikarpova	13	14
6	(China) Ma J (China) Zhong QX	21	21
(Germany) J Goliszewski (Germany) B Michels	21	21
(Denmark) A Madsen (Denmark) I Nielsen	17	12
(England) L Smith (England) G White	11	11
2	(Denmark) C Pedersen (Denmark) K Rytter Juhl	21	21

Second Round
(Japan) R Kakiiwa (Japan) M Maeda	21	21
5	(Indonesia) P Z Bernadet (Indonesia) R A Pradipta	19	12
(South Korea) Chang Y-n (South Korea) Kim S-y	12	21	21
4	(South Korea) Jung K-e (South Korea) Kim H-n	21	17	17
(Denmark) L Damkjær Kruse (Denmark) M Rœpke	22	16	21
6	(China) Ma J (China) Zhong QX	20	21	15
(Germany) J Goliszewski (Germany) B Michels	14	8
2	(Denmark) K Rytter Juhl (Denmark) C Pedersen	21	21

Quarterfinals
(Japan) R Kakiiwa (Japan) M Maeda	21	15	22
(South Korea) Chang Y-n (South Korea) Kim S-y	11	21	20
(Denmark) L Damkjær Kruse (Denmark) M Rœpke	22	10
2	(Denmark) K Rytter Juhl (Denmark) C Pedersen	24	21

Semifinals
(Japan) R Kakiiwa (Japan) M Maeda	17	21	8
2	(Denmark) K Rytter Juhl (Denmark) C Pedersen	21	7	21

=== Finals ===
Semifinals
(China) Bao Yixin (China) Tang Jinhua	19	21	21
3	(Japan) Misaki Matsutomo (Japan) Ayaka Takahashi	21	15	15
(Japan) Reika Kakiiwa (Japan) Miyuki Maeda	17	21	8
2	(Denmark) Kamilla Rytter Juhl (Denmark) Christinna Pedersen	21	7	21

Final
(China) Bao Yixin (China) Tang Jinhua	21	21
2	(Denmark) Kamilla Rytter Juhl (Denmark) Christinna Pedersen	16	13

== Mixed doubles ==
=== Seeds ===
1. (China) Zhang Nan / Zhao Yunlei
2. (China) Xu Chen / Ma Jin
3. (Indonesia) Tontowi Ahmad / Liliyana Natsir
4. (Denmark) Joachim Fischer Nielsen / Christinna Pedersen
5. (Malaysia) Chan Peng Soon / Goh Liu Ying
6. (Indonesia) Muhammad Rijal / Debby Susanto
7. (Indonesia) Markis Kido / Pia Zebadiah Bernadet
8. (South Korea) Ko Sung-hyun / Kim Ha-na

=== Top half ===
First Round
1	(China) Zhang N (China) Zhao YL	21	21
(Denmark) K Astrup (Denmark) M Helsbøl	17	9
(Denmark) M Pieler Kolding (Denmark) K Rytter Juhl	21	21
(Indonesia) R Widianto (Indonesia) R P Dili	11	16
7	(Indonesia) M Kido (Indonesia) P Z Bernadet	21	21
Q1	(Denmark) N Nøhr (Denmark) S Thygesen	11	16
(Indonesia) P Jordan (Indonesia) V Marissa	18	18
(England) C Adcock (England) G White	21	21
4	(Denmark) J Fischer Nielsen (Denmark) C Pedersen	21	21
Q2	(Indonesia) M F Gideon (Indonesia) R A Pradipta	16	18
(South Korea) Yoo Y-s (South Korea) Chang Y-n	16	21	17
(Japan) K Hayakawa (Japan) M Matsutomo	21	18	21
8	(South Korea) Ko S-h (South Korea) Kim H-n	19	21	21
PFQ	(Sweden) N Ruponen (Sweden) A Högström	21	19	15
(Germany) P Käsbauer (Germany) I Herttrich	21	21
(Denmark) A Skaarup Rasmussen (Denmark) L Grebak	19	18

Second Round
1	(China) Zhang N (China) Zhao YL	21	21
(Denmark) M Pieler Kolding (Denmark) K Rytter Juhl	16	6
7	(Indonesia) M Kido (Indonesia) P Z Bernadet	21	10	18
(England) C Adcock (England) G White	16	21	21
4	(Denmark) J Fischer Nielsen (Denmark) C Pedersen	27	22
(Japan) K Hayakawa (Japan) M Matsutomo	25	20
8	(South Korea) Ko S-h (South Korea) Kim H-n	21	21
(Germany) P Käsbauer (Germany) I Herttrich	18	13

Quarterfinals
1	(China) Zhang N (China) Zhao YL	21	21	21
(England) C Adcock (England) G White	23	16	5
4	(Denmark) J Fischer Nielsen (Denmark) C Pedersen	21	10	30
8	(South Korea) Ko S-h (South Korea) Kim H-n	14	21	29

Semifinals
1	(China) Zhang N (China) Zhao YL	21	21
4	(Denmark) J Fischer Nielsen (Denmark) C Pedersen	18	15

=== Bottom half ===
First Round
(Japan) H Hashimoto (Japan) M Maeda	24	18	21
(Germany) M Fuchs (Germany) B Michels	22	21	19
(Denmark) A Kristiansen (Denmark) J Houmann	21	21
6	(Indonesia) M Rijal (Indonesia) D Susanto	15	15
(South Korea) Shin B-c (South Korea) Eom H-w	0^{r}
(England) C Langridge (England) H Olver	3
Q4	(China) Liu C (China) Bao YX	18	15
3	(Indonesia) T Ahmad (Indonesia) L Natsir	21	21
(South Korea) Kim G-j (South Korea) Kim S-y	22	21	21
(Hong Kong) Chan Y L (Hong Kong) Tse Y S	24	13	18
(Thailand) S Prapakamol (Thailand) S Thungthongkam	21	18	19
5	(Malaysia) Chan P S (Malaysia) Goh L Y	19	21	21
Q3	(South Korea) Lee Y-d (South Korea) Shin S-c	21	21
(India) T Kona (India) A Ponnappa	14	13
(Poland) R Mateusiak (Poland) A Wojtkowska	21	16	15
2	(China) Xu C (China) Ma J	16	21	21

Second Round
(Japan) H Hashimoto (Japan) M Maeda	21	18	18
(Denmark) A Kristiansen (Denmark) J Houmann	9	21	21
(England) C Langridge (England) H Olver	11	18
3	(Indonesia) T Ahmad (Indonesia) L Natsir	21	21
(South Korea) Kim G-j (South Korea) Kim S-y	21	20	21
5	(Malaysia) Chan P S (Malaysia) Goh L Y	15	22	18
Q3	(South Korea) Lee Y-d (South Korea) Shin S-c	21	18	8
2	(China) Xu C (China) Ma J	19	21	21

Quarterfinals
(Denmark) A Kristiansen (Denmark) J Houmann	10	22
3	(Indonesia) T Ahmad (Indonesia) L Natsir	21	24
(South Korea) Kim G-j (South Korea) Kim S-y	16	10
2	(China) Xu C (China) Ma J	21	21

Semifinals
3	(Indonesia) T Ahmad (Indonesia) L Natsir	21	21
2	(China) Xu C (China) Ma J	11	18

=== Finals ===
Semifinals
1	(China) Zhang Nan (China) Zhao Yunlei	21	21
4	(Denmark) Joachim Fischer Nielsen (Denmark) Christinna Pedersen	18	15
3	(Indonesia) Tontowi Ahmad (Indonesia) Liliyana Natsir	21	21
2	(China) Xu Chen (China) Ma Jin	11	18

Final
1	(China) Zhang Nan (China) Zhao Yunlei	21	22
3	(Indonesia) Tontowi Ahmad (Indonesia) Liliyana Natsir	11	20

Preceded by 2012 Denmark Super Series Premier	Denmark Super Series	Succeeded by 2014 Denmark Super Series Premier
Preceded by 2013 Japan Super Series	2013 BWF Super Series	Succeeded by 2013 French Super Series
