= 2013 BWF Super Series Finals =

Tournament details
- Dates: 11–15 December 2013
- Level: International
- Total prize money: US$500,000
- Venue: Stadium Badminton Kuala Lumpur
- Location: Kuala Lumpur, Malaysia

Champions
- Men's singles: (Malaysia) Lee Chong Wei
- Women's singles: (China) Li Xuerui
- Men's doubles: (Indonesia) Mohammad Ahsan (Indonesia) Hendra Setiawan
- Women's doubles: (Denmark) Christinna Pedersen (Denmark) Kamilla Rytter Juhl
- Mixed doubles: (Denmark) Joachim Fischer Nielsen (Denmark) Christinna Pedersen

The 2013 BWF Super Series Finals was a top level badminton competition which was held from December 11 to December 15, 2013 in Kuala Lumpur, Malaysia. The final was held by Badminton Association of Malaysia and sponsored by Malaysia. It was the final event of the BWF Super Series competition on the 2013 BWF Super Series schedule. The total purse for the event was $500,000.

== Representatives by nation ==
Top Nations
| Rank | Nation | MS | WS | MD | WD | XD | Total | Players |
|---|---|---|---|---|---|---|---|---|
| 1 | China | 1 | 2 | 1 | 2 | 2 | 8 | 12^{§} |
| 2 | Japan | 1 | 1 | 2 | 2 | 0 | 6 | 10 |
| 3 | Indonesia | 2 | 0 | 1 | 1 | 2 | 6 | 9^{§} |
| 4 | South Korea | 0 | 2 | 2 | 1 | 0 | 5 | 8 |
| 5 | Denmark | 1 | 0 | 1 | 1 | 1 | 4 | 6^{§} |
| 5 | Thailand | 1 | 1 | 0 | 1 | 1 | 4 | 6 |
| 7 | Malaysia | 1 | 0 | 1 | 0 | 1 | 3 | 5 |
| 8 | England | 0 | 0 | 0 | 0 | 1 | 1 | 2 |
| 9 | Chinese Taipei | 0 | 1 | 0 | 0 | 0 | 1 | 1 |
| 9 | Hong Kong | 1 | 0 | 0 | 0 | 0 | 1 | 1 |
| 9 | India | 0 | 1 | 0 | 0 | 0 | 1 | 1 |
| Total | | 8 | 8 | 8 | 8 | 8 | 40 | 61 |

§: Christinna Pedersen from Denmark, Pia Zebadiah Bernadeth from Indonesia and Ma Jin from China were the players who played in two categories (women's doubles and mixed doubles).

== Performance by nation ==
| Nation | Group Phase | Semifinal | Final | Winner |
|---|---|---|---|---|
| China | 8 | 6 | 3 | 1 |
| Indonesia | 6 | 2 | 2 | 1 |
| Japan | 6 | 1 | | |
| South Korea | 5 | 4 | 1 | |
| Denmark | 4 | 4 | 2 | 2 |
| Thailand | 4 | | | |
| Malaysia | 3 | 2 | 1 | 1 |
| India | 1 | | | |
| England | 1 | | | |
| Chinese Taipei | 1 | 1 | 1 | |
| Hong Kong | 1 | | | |

== Men's singles ==
=== Seeds ===
1. (Malaysia) Lee Chong Wei
2. (Japan) Kenichi Tago
3. (Denmark) Jan Ø. Jørgensen
4. (Indonesia) Tommy Sugiarto
5. (Thailand) Boonsak Ponsana
6. (Indonesia) Sony Dwi Kuncoro
7. (China) Wang Zhengming
8. (Hong Kong) Hu Yun

=== Alternates ===
1. (Japan) Takuma Ueda
2. (Thailand) Tanongsak Saensomboonsuk

=== Group A ===
| Athlete | Pts | Pld | W | L | SF | SA | PF | PA |
|---|---|---|---|---|---|---|---|---|
| (Malaysia) Lee Chong Wei | 3 | 3 | 3 | 0 | 6 | 0 | 131 | 85 |
| (Denmark) Jan Ø. Jørgensen | 2 | 3 | 2 | 1 | 4 | 3 | 140 | 117 |
| (Thailand) Boonsak Ponsana | 1 | 3 | 1 | 2 | 3 | 4 | 107 | 130 |
| (China) Wang Zhengming | 0 | 3 | 0 | 3 | 0 | 6 | 80 | 126 |

| Date | | Score | | Set 1 | Set 2 | Set 3 |
|---|---|---|---|---|---|---|
| 11 Dec | (Denmark) Jan Ø. Jørgensen | 2-1 | (Thailand) Boonsak Ponsana | 21-19 | 13-21 | 21-11 |
| 11 Dec | (Malaysia) Lee Chong Wei | 2-0 | (China) Wang Zhengming | 21-10 | 21-18 | |
| 12 Dec | (Denmark) Jan Ø. Jørgensen | 2-0 | (China) Wang Zhengming | 21-9 | 21-10 | |
| 12 Dec | (Malaysia) Lee Chong Wei | 2-0 | (Thailand) Boonsak Ponsana | 21-6 | 21-8 | |
| 13 Dec | (Malaysia) Lee Chong Wei | 2-0 | (Denmark) Jan Ø. Jørgensen | 23-21 | 24-22 | |
| 13 Dec | (Thailand) Boonsak Ponsana | 2-0 | (China) Wang Zhengming | 21-18 | 21-15 | |

=== Group B ===
| Athlete | Pts | Pld | W | L | SF | SA | PF | PA |
|---|---|---|---|---|---|---|---|---|
| (Indonesia) Tommy Sugiarto | 2 | 2 | 2 | 0 | 4 | 1 | 104 | 80 |
| (Japan) Kenichi Tago | 1 | 2 | 1 | 1 | 3 | 3 | 120 | 123 |
| (Hong Kong) Hu Yun | 0 | 2 | 0 | 2 | 1 | 4 | 86 | 107 |
| (Indonesia) Sony Dwi Kuncoro | 0 | 0 | 0 | 0 | 0 | 0 | 0 | 0 |

| Date | | Score | | Set 1 | Set 2 | Set 3 |
|---|---|---|---|---|---|---|
| 11 Dec | (Indonesia) Tommy Sugiarto | 0-2 | (Indonesia) Sony Dwi Kuncoro | 19-21 | 10-21 | |
| 11 Dec | (Japan) Kenichi Tago | 2-1 | (Hong Kong) Hu Yun | 20-22 | 24-22 | 21-17 |
| 12 Dec | (Indonesia) Tommy Sugiarto | 2-0 | (Hong Kong) Hu Yun | 21-9 | 21-16 | |
| 12 Dec | (Japan) Kenichi Tago | 2-1 | (Indonesia) Sony Dwi Kuncoro | 12-21 | 21-19 | 21-17 |
| 13 Dec | (Japan) Kenichi Tago | 1-2 | (Indonesia) Tommy Sugiarto | 14-21 | 22-20 | 19-21 |
| 13 Dec | (Indonesia) Sony Dwi Kuncoro | w/o | (Hong Kong) Hu Yun | | | |

=== Finals ===
Semifinals
1 | (Malaysia) Lee Chong Wei | 21 | 21
3 | (Denmark) Jan Ø. Jørgensen | 14 | 16
2 | (Japan) Kenichi Tago | 14 | 21 | 5
4 | (Indonesia) Tommy Sugiarto | 21 | 19 | 21

Final
1 | (Malaysia) Lee Chong Wei | 21 | 21
4 | (Indonesia) Tommy Sugiarto | 10 | 12

== Women's singles ==
=== Seeds ===
1. (China) Wang Shixian
2. (India) Saina Nehwal
3. (South Korea) Bae Yeon-ju
4. (Thailand) Porntip Buranaprasertsuk
5. (China) Li Xuerui
6. (Japan) Minatsu Mitani
7. (South Korea) Sung Ji-hyun
8. (Chinese Taipei) Tai Tzu-ying

=== Alternates ===
1. (Japan) Eriko Hirose
2. (Germany) Juliane Schenk

=== Group A ===
| Athlete | Pts | Pld | W | L | SF | SA | PF | PA |
|---|---|---|---|---|---|---|---|---|
| (China) Wang Shixian | 3 | 3 | 3 | 0 | 6 | 0 | 129 | 100 |
| (Chinese Taipei) Tai Tzu-ying | 2 | 3 | 2 | 1 | 4 | 3 | 131 | 128 |
| (South Korea) Sung Ji-hyun | 1 | 3 | 1 | 2 | 3 | 5 | 125 | 150 |
| (Thailand) Porntip Buranaprasertsuk | 0 | 3 | 0 | 3 | 1 | 6 | 128 | 135 |

| Date | | Score | | Set 1 | Set 2 | Set 3 |
|---|---|---|---|---|---|---|
| 11 Dec | (Thailand) Porntip Buranaprasertsuk | 1-2 | (South Korea) Sung Ji-hyun | 19-21 | 21-8 | 16-21 |
| 11 Dec | (China) Wang Shixian | 2-0 | (Chinese Taipei) Tai Tzu-ying | 21-16 | 23-21 | |
| 12 Dec | (Thailand) Porntip Buranaprasertsuk | 0-2 | (Chinese Taipei) Tai Tzu-ying | 19-21 | 17-21 | |
| 12 Dec | (China) Wang Shixian | 2-0 | (South Korea) Sung Ji-hyun | 21-12 | 21-15 | |
| 13 Dec | (China) Wang Shixian | 2-0 | (Thailand) Porntip Buranaprasertsuk | 21-16 | 22-20 | |
| 13 Dec | (South Korea) Sung Ji-hyun | 1-2 | (Chinese Taipei) Tai Tzu-ying | 21-10 | 12-21 | 15-21 |

=== Group B ===
| Athlete | Pts | Pld | W | L | SF | SA | PF | PA |
|---|---|---|---|---|---|---|---|---|
| (China) Li Xuerui | 3 | 3 | 3 | 0 | 6 | 0 | 126 | 64 |
| (South Korea) Bae Yeon-ju | 1 | 3 | 1 | 2 | 3 | 4 | 103 | 129 |
| (India) Saina Nehwal | 1 | 3 | 1 | 2 | 3 | 5 | 144 | 151 |
| (Japan) Minatsu Mitani | 1 | 3 | 1 | 2 | 2 | 5 | 117 | 146 |

| Date | | Score | | Set 1 | Set 2 | Set 3 |
|---|---|---|---|---|---|---|
| 11 Dec | (South Korea) Bae Yeon-ju | 0-2 | (China) Li Xuerui | 9-21 | 7-21 | |
| 11 Dec | (India) Saina Nehwal | 1-2 | (Japan) Minatsu Mitani | 21-19 | 22-24 | 19-21 |
| 12 Dec | (South Korea) Bae Yeon-ju | 2-0 | (Japan) Minatsu Mitani | 21-10 | 21-18 | |
| 12 Dec | (India) Saina Nehwal | 0-2 | (China) Li Xuerui | 9-21 | 14-21 | |
| 13 Dec | (India) Saina Nehwal | 2-1 | (South Korea) Bae Yeon-ju | 21-11 | 17-21 | 21-13 |
| 13 Dec | (China) Li Xuerui | 2-0 | (Japan) Minatsu Mitani | 21-11 | 21-14 | |

=== Finals ===
Semifinals
1 | (China) Wang Shixian | 21 | 19 | 20
(Chinese Taipei) Tai Tzu-ying | 15 | 21 | 22
3 | (South Korea) Bae Yeon-ju | 15 | 9
(China) Li Xuerui | 21 | 21

Final
(Chinese Taipei) Tai Tzu-ying | 8 | 14
(China) Li Xuerui | 21 | 21

== Men's doubles ==
=== Seeds ===
1. (Indonesia) Mohammad Ahsan / Hendra Setiawan
2. (Japan) Hiroyuki Endo / Kenichi Hayakawa
3. (China) Liu Xiaolong / Qiu Zihan
4. (South Korea) Ko Sung Hyun / Lee Yong Dae
5. (Japan) Hirokatsu Hashimoto / Noriyasu Hirata
6. (South Korea) Kim Ki-jung / Kim Sa-rang
7. (Denmark) Mathias Boe / Carsten Mogensen
8. (Malaysia) Hoon Thien How / Tan Wee Kiong

=== Alternates ===
1. (England) Chris Adcock / Andrew Ellis

=== Group A ===
| Athlete | Pts | Pld | W | L | SF | SA | PF | PA |
|---|---|---|---|---|---|---|---|---|
| (Indonesia) Mohammad Ahsan (Indonesia) Hendra Setiawan | 2 | 3 | 2 | 1 | 5 | 2 | 131 | 120 |
| (South Korea) Kim Ki-jung (South Korea) Kim Sa-rang | 2 | 3 | 2 | 1 | 4 | 3 | 137 | 141 |
| (Malaysia) Hoon Thien How (Malaysia) Tan Wee Kiong | 1 | 3 | 1 | 2 | 2 | 5 | 128 | 134 |
| (China) Liu Xiaolong (China) Qiu Zihan | 1 | 3 | 1 | 2 | 4 | 5 | 162 | 163 |

| Date | | Score | | Set 1 | Set 2 | Set 3 |
|---|---|---|---|---|---|---|
| 11 Dec | (China) Liu Xiaolong (China) Qiu Zihan | 1-2 | (South Korea) Kim Ki-jung (South Korea) Kim Sa-rang | 21-23 | 21-13 | 18-21 |
| 11 Dec | (Indonesia) Mohammad Ahsan (Indonesia) Hendra Setiawan | 2-0 | (Malaysia) Hoon Thien How (Malaysia) Tan Wee Kiong | 21-17 | 21-13 | |
| 12 Dec | (China) Liu Xiaolong (China) Qiu Zihan | 1-2 | (Malaysia) Hoon Thien How (Malaysia) Tan Wee Kiong | 21-18 | 15-21 | 13-21 |
| 12 Dec | (Indonesia) Mohammad Ahsan (Indonesia) Hendra Setiawan | 2-0 | (South Korea) Kim Ki-jung (South Korea) Kim Sa-rang | 21-17 | 22-20 | |
| 13 Dec | (Indonesia) Mohammad Ahsan (Indonesia) Hendra Setiawan | 1-2 | (China) Liu Xiaolong (China) Qiu Zihan | 13-21 | 21-11 | 12-21 |
| 13 Dec | (South Korea) Kim Ki-jung (South Korea) Kim Sa-rang | 2-0 | (Malaysia) Hoon Thien How (Malaysia) Tan Wee Kiong | 21-18 | 22-20 | |

=== Group B ===
| Athlete | Pts | Pld | W | L | SF | SA | PF | PA |
|---|---|---|---|---|---|---|---|---|
| (South Korea) Ko Sung Hyun (South Korea) Lee Yong Dae | 1 | 2 | 1 | 1 | 2 | 2 | 77 | 72 |
| (Denmark) Mathias Boe (Denmark) Carsten Mogensen | 1 | 2 | 1 | 1 | 2 | 2 | 75 | 77 |
| (Japan) Hiroyuki Endo (Japan) Kenichi Hayakawa | 1 | 2 | 1 | 1 | 2 | 2 | 72 | 75 |
| (Japan) Hirokatsu Hashimoto (Japan) Noriyasu Hirata | 0 | 0 | 0 | 0 | 0 | 0 | 0 | 0 |

| Date | | Score | | Set 1 | Set 2 | Set 3 |
|---|---|---|---|---|---|---|
| | (Japan) Hirokatsu Hashimoto (Japan) Noriyasu Hirata | w/o | (Denmark) Mathias Boe (Denmark) Carsten Mogensen | | | |
| Dec 11 | (Japan) Hiroyuki Endo (Japan) Kenichi Hayakawa | 2-1 | (Japan) Hirokatsu Hashimoto (Japan) Noriyasu Hirata | 19-21 | 21-19 | 21-12 |
| Dec 11 | (South Korea) Ko Sung Hyun (South Korea) Lee Yong Dae | 0-2 | (Denmark) Mathias Boe (Denmark) Carsten Mogensen | 16-21 | 19-21 | |
| Dec 12 | (South Korea) Ko Sung Hyun (South Korea) Lee Yong Dae | w/o | (Japan) Hirokatsu Hashimoto (Japan) Noriyasu Hirata | | | |
| Dec 12 | (Japan) Hiroyuki Endo (Japan) Kenichi Hayakawa | 2-0 | (Denmark) Mathias Boe (Denmark) Carsten Mogensen | 21-18 | 21-15 | |
| Dec 13 | (Japan) Hiroyuki Endo (Japan) Kenichi Hayakawa | 0-2 | (South Korea) Ko Sung Hyun (South Korea) Lee Yong Dae | 13-21 | 17-21 | |

=== Finals ===
Semifinals
1 | (Indonesia) Mohammad Ahsan (Indonesia) Hendra Setiawan | 21 | 21
(Denmark) Mathias Boe (Denmark) Carsten Mogensen | 18 | 18
(South Korea) Kim Gi-jung (South Korea) Kim Sa-rang | 21 | 19 | 21
4 | (South Korea) Ko Sung Hyun (South Korea) Lee Yong Dae | 14 | 21 | 16

Final
1 | (Indonesia) Mohammad Ahsan (Indonesia) Hendra Setiawan | 21 | 21
(South Korea) Kim Gi-jung (South Korea) Kim Sa-rang | 14 | 16

== Women's doubles ==
=== Seeds ===
1. (Japan) Misaki Matsutomo / Ayaka Takahashi
2. (China) Wang Xiaoli / Yu Yang
3. (Denmark) Christinna Pedersen / Kamilla Rytter Juhl
4. (China) Ma Jin / Tang Jinhua
5. (Indonesia) Pia Zebadiah Bernadeth / Rizki Amelia Pradipta
6. (Thailand) Duanganong Aroonkesorn / Kunchala Voravichitchaikul
7. (Japan) Reika Kakiiwa / Miyuki Maeda
8. (South Korea) Chang Ye-na / Kim So-young

=== Alternates ===
1. (Hong Kong) Poon Lok Yan / Tse Ying Suet
2. (Indonesia) Aprilsasi Putri Lejarsar Variella / Vita Marissa

=== Group A ===
| Athlete | Pts | Pld | W | L | SF | SA | PF | PA |
|---|---|---|---|---|---|---|---|---|
| (China) Ma Jin (China) Tang Jinhua | 3 | 3 | 3 | 0 | 6 | 1 | 142 | 106 |
| (South Korea) Chang Ye-na (South Korea) Kim So-young | 2 | 3 | 2 | 1 | 5 | 2 | 143 | 128 |
| (Japan) Misaki Matsutomo (Japan) Ayaka Takahashi | 1 | 3 | 1 | 2 | 2 | 5 | 126 | 134 |
| (Indonesia) Pia Zebadiah Bernadeth (Indonesia) Rizki Amelia Pradipta | 0 | 3 | 0 | 3 | 1 | 6 | 102 | 145 |

| Date | | Score | | Set 1 | Set 2 | Set 3 |
|---|---|---|---|---|---|---|
| 11 Dec | (China) Ma Jin (China) Tang Jinhua | 2-0 | (Indonesia) Pia Zebadiah Bernadeth (Indonesia) Rizki Amelia Pradipta | 21-3 | 22-20 | |
| 11 Dec | (Japan) Misaki Matsutomo (Japan) Ayaka Takahashi | 0-2 | (South Korea) Chang Ye-na (South Korea) Kim So-young | 22-24 | 17-21 | |
| 12 Dec | (China) Ma Jin (China) Tang Jinhua | 2-1 | (South Korea) Chang Ye-na (South Korea) Kim So-young | 24-22 | 12-21 | 21-13 |
| 12 Dec | (Japan) Misaki Matsutomo (Japan) Ayaka Takahashi | 2-1 | (Indonesia) Pia Zebadiah Bernadeth (Indonesia) Rizki Amelia Pradipta | 21-11 | 18-21 | 21-15 |
| 13 Dec | (Japan) Misaki Matsutomo (Japan) Ayaka Takahashi | 0-2 | (China) Ma Jin (China) Tang Jinhua | 12-21 | 15-21 | |
| 13 Dec | (Indonesia) Pia Zebadiah Bernadeth (Indonesia) Rizki Amelia Pradipta | 0-2 | (South Korea) Chang Ye-na (South Korea) Kim So-young | 16-21 | 16-21 | |

=== Group B ===
| Athlete | Pts | Pld | W | L | SF | SA | PF | PA |
|---|---|---|---|---|---|---|---|---|
| (Denmark) Christinna Pedersen (Denmark) Kamilla Rytter Juhl | 3 | 3 | 3 | 0 | 6 | 2 | 161 | 133 |
| (China) Wang Xiaoli (China) Yu Yang | 2 | 3 | 2 | 1 | 5 | 2 | 133 | 122 |
| (Japan) Reika Kakiiwa (Japan) Miyuki Maeda | 1 | 3 | 1 | 2 | 3 | 5 | 141 | 157 |
| (Thailand) Duanganong Aroonkesorn (Thailand) Kunchala Voravichitchaikul | 0 | 3 | 0 | 3 | 1 | 6 | 119 | 142 |

| Date | | Score | | Set 1 | Set 2 | Set 3 |
|---|---|---|---|---|---|---|
| 11 Dec | (Denmark) Christinna Pedersen (Denmark) Kamilla Rytter Juhl | 2-0 | (Thailand) Duanganong Aroonkesorn (Thailand) Kunchala Voravichitchaikul | 21-16 | 21-17 | |
| 11 Dec | (China) Wang Xiaoli (China) Yu Yang | 2-0 | (Japan) Reika Kakiiwa (Japan) Miyuki Maeda | 23-21 | 21-9 | |
| 12 Dec | (Denmark) Christinna Pedersen (Denmark) Kamilla Rytter Juhl | 2-1 | (Japan) Reika Kakiiwa (Japan) Miyuki Maeda | 19-21 | 21-16 | 21-16 |
| 12 Dec | (China) Wang Xiaoli (China) Yu Yang | 2-0 | (Thailand) Duanganong Aroonkesorn (Thailand) Kunchala Voravichitchaikul | 21-17 | 21-17 | |
| 13 Dec | (China) Wang Xiaoli (China) Yu Yang | 1-2 | (Denmark) Christinna Pedersen (Denmark) Kamilla Rytter Juhl | 11-21 | 21-16 | 15-21 |
| 13 Dec | (Thailand) Duanganong Aroonkesorn (Thailand) Kunchala Voravichitchaikul | 1-2 | (Japan) Reika Kakiiwa (Japan) Miyuki Maeda | 19-21 | 21-16 | 12-21 |

=== Finals ===
Semifinals
4 | (China) Ma Jin (China) Tang Jinhua | w/o
2 | (China) Wang Xiaoli (China) Yu Yang
(South Korea) Chang Ye-na (South Korea) Kim So-young | 12 | 18
3 | (Denmark) Christinna Pedersen (Denmark) Kamilla Rytter Juhl | 21 | 21

Final
4 | (China) Ma Jin (China) Tang Jinhua | 19 | 12
3 | (Denmark) Christinna Pedersen (Denmark) Kamilla Rytter Juhl | 21 | 21

== Mixed doubles ==
=== Seeds ===
1. (China) Zhang Nan / Zhao Yunlei
2. (Indonesia) Tontowi Ahmad / Liliyana Natsir
3. (England) Chris Adcock / Gabrielle White
4. (Denmark) Joachim Fischer Nielsen / Christinna Pedersen
5. (China) Xu Chen / Ma Jin
6. (Malaysia) Chan Peng Soon / Goh Liu Ying
7. (Indonesia) Markis Kido / Pia Zebadiah Bernadeth
8. (Thailand) Sudket Prapakamol / Saralee Thoungthongkam

=== Alternates ===
1. (Japan) Kenichi Hayakawa / Misaki Matsutomo
2. (Japan) Hirokatsu Hashimoto / Miyuki Maeda

=== Group A ===
| Athlete | Pts | Pld | W | L | SF | SA | PF | PA |
|---|---|---|---|---|---|---|---|---|
| (China) Zhang Nan (China) Zhao Yunlei | 3 | 3 | 3 | 0 | 6 | 0 | 126 | 78 |
| (Malaysia) Chan Peng Soon (Malaysia) Goh Liu Ying | 2 | 3 | 2 | 1 | 4 | 3 | 129 | 133 |
| (England) Chris Adcock (England) Gabrielle White | 1 | 3 | 1 | 2 | 3 | 4 | 128 | 128 |
| (Indonesia) Markis Kido (Indonesia) Pia Zebadiah Bernadeth | 0 | 3 | 0 | 3 | 0 | 6 | 82 | 126 |

| Date | | Score | | Set 1 | Set 2 | Set 3 |
|---|---|---|---|---|---|---|
| 11 Dec | (England) Chris Adcock (England) Gabrielle White | 1-2 | (Malaysia) Chan Peng Soon (Malaysia) Goh Liu Ying | 21-16 | 14-21 | 19-21 |
| 11 Dec | (China) Zhang Nan (China) Zhao Yunlei | 2-0 | (Indonesia) Markis Kido (Indonesia) Pia Zebadiah Bernadeth | 21-9 | 21-8 | |
| 12 Dec | (England) Chris Adcock (England) Gabrielle White | 2-0 | (Indonesia) Markis Kido (Indonesia) Pia Zebadiah Bernadeth | 21-10 | 21-18 | |
| 12 Dec | (China) Zhang Nan (China) Zhao Yunlei | 2-0 | (Malaysia) Chan Peng Soon (Malaysia) Goh Liu Ying | 21-17 | 21-12 | |
| 13 Dec | (China) Zhang Nan (China) Zhao Yunlei | 2-0 | (England) Chris Adcock (England) Gabrielle White | 21-15 | 21-17 | |
| 13 Dec | (Malaysia) Chan Peng Soon (Malaysia) Goh Liu Ying | 2-0 | (Indonesia) Markis Kido (Indonesia) Pia Zebadiah Bernadeth | 21-18 | 21-19 | |

=== Group B ===
| Athlete | Pts | Pld | W | L | SF | SA | PF | PA |
|---|---|---|---|---|---|---|---|---|
| (Denmark) Joachim Fischer Nielsen (Denmark) Christinna Pedersen | 3 | 3 | 3 | 0 | 6 | 0 | 127 | 85 |
| (China) Xu Chen (China) Ma Jin | 2 | 3 | 2 | 1 | 4 | 2 | 117 | 99 |
| (Thailand) Sudket Prapakamol (Thailand) Saralee Thoungthongkam | 1 | 3 | 1 | 2 | 2 | 5 | 98 | 145 |
| (Indonesia) Tontowi Ahmad (Indonesia) Liliyana Natsir | 0 | 3 | 0 | 3 | 1 | 6 | 129 | 142 |

| Date | | Score | | Set 1 | Set 2 | Set 3 |
|---|---|---|---|---|---|---|
| 11 Dec | (Denmark) Joachim Fischer Nielsen (Denmark) Christinna Pedersen | 2-0 | (China) Xu Chen (China) Ma Jin | 21-11 | 22-10 | |
| 11 Dec | (Indonesia) Tontowi Ahmad (Indonesia) Liliyana Natsir | 1-2 | (Thailand) Sudket Prapakamol (Thailand) Saralee Thoungthongkam | 21-9 | 24-26 | 16-21 |
| 12 Dec | (Denmark) Joachim Fischer Nielsen (Denmark) Christinna Pedersen | 2-0 | (Thailand) Sudket Prapakamol (Thailand) Saralee Thoungthongkam | 21-9 | 21-14 | |
| 12 Dec | (Indonesia) Tontowi Ahmad (Indonesia) Liliyana Natsir | 0-2 | (China) Xu Chen (China) Ma Jin | 21-13 | 16-21 | |
| 13 Dec | (Indonesia) Tontowi Ahmad (Indonesia) Liliyana Natsir | 0-2 | (Denmark) Joachim Fischer Nielsen (Denmark) Christinna Pedersen | 19-21 | 12-21 | |
| 13 Dec | (China) Xu Chen (China) Ma Jin | 2-0 | (Thailand) Sudket Prapakamol (Thailand) Saralee Thoungthongkam | 21-6 | 21-13 | |

=== Finals ===
Semifinals
1 | (China) Zhang Nan (China) Zhao Yunlei | 21 | 21
(Malaysia) Chan Peng Soon (Malaysia) Goh Liu Ying | 17 | 10
(China) Xu Chen (China) Ma Jin | 8 | 3^{r}
4 | (Denmark) Joachim Fischer Nielsen (Denmark) Christinna Pedersen | 21 | 11

Final
1 | (China) Zhang Nan (China) Zhao Yunlei | 21 | 19 | 10
4 | (Denmark) Joachim Fischer Nielsen (Denmark) Christinna Pedersen | 12 | 21 | 21
