= Li Xuerui =

Chinese badminton player (born 1991)

Li Xuerui 李雪芮
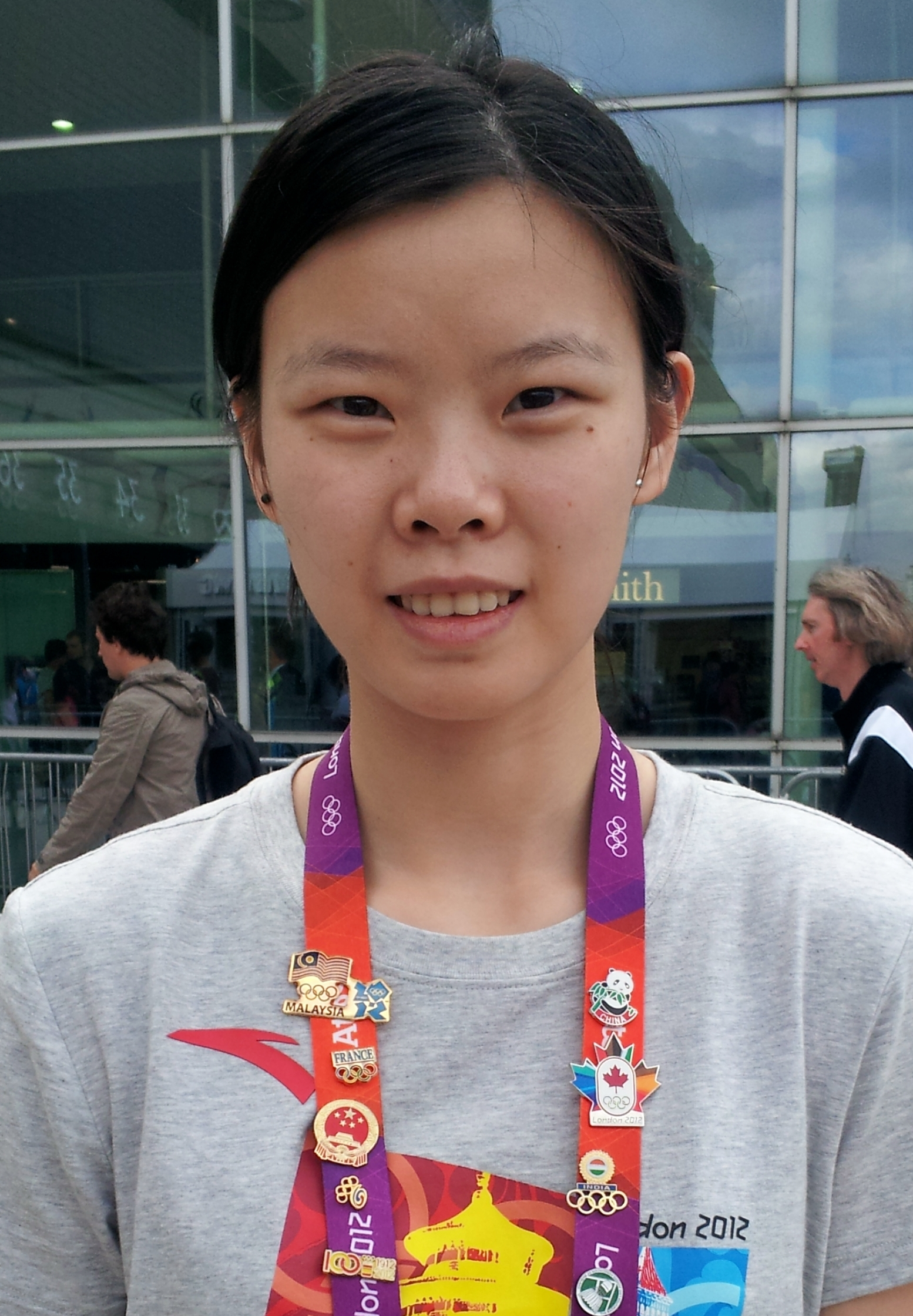
- Li at the 2012 Summer Olympics

Personal information
- Born: 24 January 1991 (age 35) Chongqing, China
- Years active: 2007–2019
- Height: 1.74 m (5 ft 8 1/2 in)
- Spouse: Qiao Bin (m. 2019)

Sport
- Country: China
- Sport: Badminton
- Handedness: Right
- Coached by: Chen Jin
- Retired: 17 October 2019

Women's singles
- Career record: 330 wins, 79 losses
- Career title: 27
- Highest ranking: 1 (20 December 2012)
- BWF profile
Medal record
Women's badminton
Representing China
Olympic Games
Gold medal – first place	2012 London	Women's singles
World Championships
Silver medal – second place	2013 Guangzhou	Women's singles
Silver medal – second place	2014 Copenhagen	Women's singles
Sudirman Cup
Gold medal – first place	2013 Kuala Lumpur	Mixed team
Gold medal – first place	2015 Dongguan	Mixed team
Silver medal – second place	2017 Gold Coast	Mixed team
Uber Cup
Gold medal – first place	2012 Wuhan	Women's team
Gold medal – first place	2014 New Delhi	Women's team
Gold medal – first place	2016 Kunshan	Women's team
Bronze medal – third place	2018 Bangkok	Women's team
Asian Games
Gold medal – first place	2014 Incheon	Women's team
Silver medal – second place	2014 Incheon	Women's singles
Asian Championships
Gold medal – first place	2010 New Delhi	Women's singles
Gold medal – first place	2012 Qingdao	Women's singles
Silver medal – second place	2013 Taipei	Women's singles
Silver medal – second place	2015 Wuhan	Women's singles
Silver medal – second place	2016 Wuhan	Women's singles
World Junior Championships
Gold medal – first place	2007 Waitakere City	Mixed team
Gold medal – first place	2008 Pune	Mixed team
Asian Junior Championships
Gold medal – first place	2008 Kuala Lumpur	Girls' singles
Gold medal – first place	2008 Kuala Lumpur	Mixed team

Li Xuerui
- Traditional Chinese: 李雪芮
- Simplified Chinese: 李雪芮
Transcriptions
Standard Mandarin
- Hanyu Pinyin: Lǐ Xuěruì

Li Xuerui (born 24 January 1991) is a retired Chinese professional badminton player. She is one of the most successful players of her time. She was a gold medalist at 2012 London Olympics in the women's singles event and was the silver medalists in the 2013 and 2014 World Championships. Li Xuerui won fourteen Superseries titles, confirming her status as China's second most successful player after Wang Yihan. She reached a career high of no. 1 in the women's singles for 124 weeks. Li graduated with a BA from Huaqiao University.

== Career summary ==
Li Xuerui started playing badminton when she was 7 years old. She began playing in local clubs in her hometown in Chongqing. She made her professional debut as a badminton player when she attended the Asia Junior championship which took place in Kuala Lumpur, Malaysia.

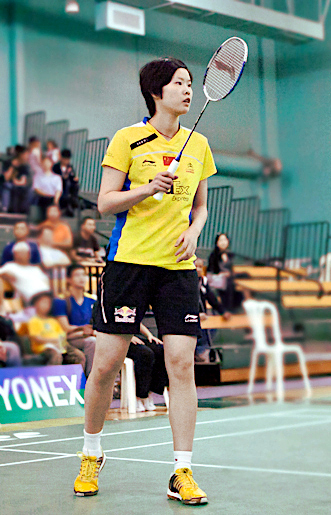
Li Xuerui at the US Open 2011

=== 2008 ===
In 2008, she won a gold medal at the Asian Junior championship, which took place in Kuala Lumpur, Malaysia.

=== 2010 ===
In 2010, Li Xuerui won her first Grand Prix Gold title at the Macau Open, in the final she defeated Adrianti Firdasari from Indonesia with a score of 21–18, 21–15.

Li won her first major tournament, the Asian Championships. In the final, she defeated her compatriot, Liu Xin, 21–13, 18–21, 21–19.

=== 2012 ===
In 2012, she repeated her success at the Asian Championships by defeating Wang Yihan with a score of 21–16, 16–21, 21–9.

Li won the prestigious Super Series Premier event title at the All England Open for the first time by beating Wang Yihan in the final with a score of 21–13, 21–19.

She then captured other international titles in India Open, China Open, and Hong Kong Open.

She collected five Super Series titles, including the Super Series Final in Dubai which she won defeating Wang Shixian in the final.

The 2012 season could be said to be the career peak for Li Xuerui. She made her first appearance at the Olympic Games, and on August 5, she won the London Olympic gold medal, in the final she defeated compatriot Wang Yihan with a score of 21–15, 21–23, 21–17.

=== 2013 ===
In 2013, she won a silver medal in the World Championship when she was defeated by Thailand's Ratchanok Intanon in the final with a score of 22–20, 18–21, 14–21.

In the same year, she won three Super Series titles in the Indonesia Open, China Open and the Super Series Final.

=== 2014 ===
In 2014, she reached the World Championships final, then she lost to the Spanish player Carolina Marín with a score of 21–17, 17–21, 18–21.

Li managed to win four Super Series titles including successfully defending her title in Indonesia Open, the other titles were: Japan Open, Malaysia Open, and Denmark Open.

=== 2015 ===
In 2015, Li Xuerui managed to defend her title at the Denmark Open. In the final she defeated P. V. Sindhu of India with a score of 21-19, 21-12.

=== 2016 Summer Olympics: heartbreak and injury issues ===
At the 2016 Summer Olympics women's singles semi-finals, Li Xuerui was defeated by world No. 1 Carolina Marín when she suffered injuries to her anterior cruciate ligament (ACL) and lateral meniscus. This forced her to withdraw from the bronze medal match against Nozomi Okuhara.

=== 2018: Return to professional badminton ===
Li made her return to professional badminton at the 2017 National Games of China, where she played women's doubles but lost at the group stage. The reason she had played doubles instead of singles was that she was not yet fully recovered. In 2018, she made her return to international women's singles after a hiatus of 600 days at the 2018 Lingshui China Masters, which she won.

=== 2019 ===
In 2019, she played 25 times with 11 wins and 14 losses. She reached the quarter final at the All England Open, but was stopped by the 2017 World Champion from Japan Nozomi Okuhara with a score of 17–21, 14–21. After that, she finished as the runner-up at the New Zealand Open, losing to South Korean youngster An Se-young with a score of 19–21, 15–21.

She lost to Busanan Ongbamrungphan 21-18, 20-22, 6-21 at the Australian Open despite leading in the second game. Afterwards, her career witnessed a huge downfall. She competed in Indonesia, Thailand, Japan and China and lost in the first round in all the tournaments. She announced her retirement from the international circuit in the first round match against Sayaka Takahashi in Korea Open on 17 October after trailing in the 2nd game 15-21, 3-11.

== Achievements ==
=== Olympic Games ===
Women's singles
Year	Venue	Opponent	Score	Result
2012	Wembley Arena, London, Great Britain	(China) Wang Yihan	21–15, 21–23, 21–17	Gold

=== World Championships ===
Women's singles
Year	Venue	Opponent	Score	Result
2013	Tianhe Sports Center, Guangzhou, China	(Thailand) Ratchanok Intanon	20–22, 21–18, 14–21	Silver
2014	Ballerup Super Arena, Copenhagen, Denmark	(Spain) Carolina Marín	21–17, 17–21, 18–21	Silver

=== Asian Games ===
Women's singles
Year	Venue	Opponent	Score	Result
2014	Gyeyang Gymnasium, Incheon, South Korea	(China) Wang Yihan	21–11, 17–21, 7–21	Silver

=== Asian Championships ===
Women's singles
Year	Venue	Opponent	Score	Result
2010	Siri Fort Indoor Stadium, New Delhi, India	(China) Liu Xin	21–13, 18–21, 21–19	Gold
2012	Qingdao Sports Centre Conson Stadium, Qingdao, China	(China) Wang Yihan	21–16, 16–21, 21–9	Gold
2013	Taipei Arena, Taipei, Taiwan	(China) Wang Yihan	15–21, 13–21	Silver
2015	Wuhan Sports Center Gymnasium, Wuhan, China	(Thailand) Ratchanok Intanon	22–20, 21–23, 12–21	Silver
2016	Wuhan Sports Center Gymnasium, Wuhan, China	(China) Wang Yihan	14–21, 21–13, 16–21	Silver

=== World University Championships ===
Women's singles
Year	Venue	Opponent	Score	Result
2010	Taipei Gymnasium, Taipei, Chinese Taipei	(China) Liu Xin	21–12, 21–14	Gold

Women's doubles
Year	Venue	Partner	Opponent	Score	Result
2010	Taipei Gymnasium, Taipei, Chinese Taipei	(China) Liu Xin	(China) Cheng Shu (China) Ma Jin	Walkover	Silver

=== Asian Junior Championships ===
Girls' singles
Year	Venue	Opponent	Score	Result
2008	Stadium Juara, Kuala Lumpur, Malaysia	(China) Wang Shixian	22–20, 21–13	Gold

=== BWF World Tour (4 titles, 1 runner-up) ===
The BWF World Tour, which was announced on 19 March 2017 and implemented in 2018, is a series of elite badminton tournaments sanctioned by the Badminton World Federation (BWF). The BWF World Tour is divided into levels of World Tour Finals, Super 1000, Super 750, Super 500, Super 300 (part of the HSBC World Tour), and the BWF Tour Super 100.

Women's singles
Year	Tournament	Level	Opponent	Score	Result
2018	Lingshui China Masters	Super 100	(South Korea) Kim Ga-eun	16–21, 21–16, 21–18	(gold) Winner
2018	U.S. Open	Super 300	(United States) Beiwen Zhang	24–26, 21–15, 21–11	(gold) Winner
2018	Canada Open	Super 100	(Japan) Sayaka Takahashi	22–20, 15–21, 21–17	(gold) Winner
2018	Korea Masters	Super 300	(China) Han Yue	21–10, 21–18	(gold) Winner
2019	New Zealand Open	Super 300	(South Korea) An Se-young	19–21, 15–21	(silver) Runner-up

=== BWF Superseries (14 titles, 10 runners-up) ===
The BWF Superseries, launched on 14 December 2006 and implemented in 2007, is a series of elite badminton tournaments, sanctioned by Badminton World Federation (BWF). BWF Superseries has two levels: Superseries and Superseries Premier. A season of Superseries features twelve tournaments around the world, which introduced since 2011, with successful players invited to the Superseries Finals held at the year end.

Women's singles
Year	Tournament	Opponent	Score	Result
2010	French Open	(China) Wang Yihan	13–21, 9–21	(silver) Runner-up
2011	French Open	(China) Wang Xin	15–21, 19–21	(silver) Runner-up
2012	All England Open	(China) Wang Yihan	21–13, 21–19	(gold) Winner
2012	India Open	(Germany) Juliane Schenk	14–21, 21–17, 21–8	(gold) Winner
2012	Indonesia Open	(India) Saina Nehwal	21–13, 20–22, 19–21	(silver) Runner-up
2012	China Open	(Thailand) Ratchanok Intanon	21–12, 21–9	(gold) Winner
2012	Hong Kong Open	(China) Wang Yihan	21–12, 11–3 retired	(gold) Winner
2012	World Superseries Finals	(China) Wang Shixian	21–9, 15–4 retired	(gold) Winner
2013	Indonesia Open	(Germany) Juliane Schenk	21–16, 18–21, 21–17	(gold) Winner
2013	Singapore Open	(China) Wang Yihan	18–21, 12–21	(silver) Runner-up
2013	China Open	(China) Wang Shixian	16–21, 21–17, 21–19	(gold) Winner
2013	World Superseries Finals	(Chinese Taipei) Tai Tzu-ying	21–8, 21–14	(gold) Winner
2014	Malaysia Open	(China) Wang Shixian	21–16, 21–17	(gold) Winner
2014	All England Open	(China) Wang Shixian	19–21, 18–21	(silver) Runner-up
2014	India Open	(China) Wang Shixian	20–22, 19–21	(silver) Runner-up
2014	Singapore Open	(China) Wang Yihan	11–21, 19–21	(silver) Runner-up
2014	Japan Open	(Chinese Taipei) Tai Tzu-ying	21–16, 21–6	(gold) Winner
2014	Indonesia Open	(Thailand) Ratchanok Intanon	21–13, 21–13	(gold) Winner
2014	Denmark Open	(China) Wang Yihan	21–17, 22–20	(gold) Winner
2014	French Open	(China) Wang Shixian	15–21, 3–8 retired	(silver) Runner-up
2015	Malaysia Open	(Spain) Carolina Marín	21–19, 19–21, 17–21	(silver) Runner-up
2015	Denmark Open	(India) P. V. Sindhu	21–19, 21–12	(gold) Winner
2015	China Open	(India) Saina Nehwal	21–12, 21–15	(gold) Winner
2016	India Open	(Thailand) Ratchanok Intanon	17–21, 18–21	(silver) Runner-up

BWF Super Series Finals tournament
BWF Super Series Premier tournament
BWF Super Series tournament

=== BWF Grand Prix (6 titles, 2 runners-up) ===
The BWF Grand Prix has two levels, the BWF Grand Prix and Grand Prix Gold. It is a series of badminton tournaments sanctioned by the Badminton World Federation (BWF) since 2007.

Women's singles
Year	Tournament	Opponent	Score	Result
2010	Macau Open	(Indonesia) Adriyanti Firdasari	21–18, 21–15	(gold) Winner
2010	Korea Grand Prix	(China) Liu Xin	9–21, 14–21	(silver) Runner-up
2011	Thailand Open	(China) Jiang Yanjiao	14–21, 21–14, 21–14	(gold) Winner
2011	Bitburger Open	(Netherlands) Yao Jie	21–8, 21–9	(gold) Winner
2012	German Open	(Germany) Juliane Schenk	21–19, 21–16	(gold) Winner
2015	Chinese Taipei Open	(China) Wang Yihan	10–21, 9–21	(silver) Runner-up
2016	German Open	(China) Wang Shixian	21–14, 21–17	(gold) Winner
2016	China Masters	(China) Sun Yu	21–16, 19–21, 21–6	(gold) Winner

BWF Grand Prix Gold tournament
BWF Grand Prix tournament

== Performance timeline ==
=== Singles performance timeline ===
Key

W	Won	F	Finalist	SF	Semi-finalist
QF	Quarter-finalist	#R	Rounds 4, 3, 2, 1	RR	Round-robin stage
Q#	Qualification round	A	Absent	w/d	Withdrew
G	Gold	S	Silver	B	Bronze
NH	Not held	N/A	Not applicable	DNQ	Did not qualify

To avoid confusion and double counting, information in this table is updated only once a tournament or the player's participation in the tournament has concluded. This table is current through 2016 Indonesia Open.

Tournament	2007	2008	2009	2010	2011	2012	2013	2014	2015	2016	SR	W–L	Win %
Summer Olympics	NH	A	Not Held			G 6–0	Not Held			4th 4–1	1 / 2	10–1	91%
World Championships	A	NH	Absent			NH	S 4–1	S 4–1	3R; 1–1	NH	0 / 3	9–3	75%
World Superseries Finals	NH	Absent				W 5–0	W 5–0	Absent			2 / 2	10–0	100%
Asian Championships	Absent			G 8–0	QF; 2–1	G 5–0	S 4–1	A	S 4–1	S 4–1	2 / 6	27–4	87%
Asian Games	Not Held			A	Not Held			S 3–1	Not Held		0 / 1	3–1	75%
East Asian Games	Not Held		A	Not Held			A	Not Held			0 / 0		
Team Competitions
Uber Cup	NH	A	NH	A	NH	G 2–0	NH	G 6–0	NH	G 5–0	3 / 3	13–0	100%
Sudirman Cup	A	NH	A	NH	A	NH	G 3–0	NH	G 3–0	NH	2 / 2	6–0	100%
Asian Games	Not Held			A	Not Held			G 3–0	Not Held		1 / 1	3–0	100%
Uber Cup Asia preliminaries	Not Held					S 4–0	Not Held			A	0 / 1	4–0	100%
East Asian Games	Not Held		A	Not Held			A	Not Held			0 / 0		
BWF World Superseries Premier
All England Open	Absent				2R; 1–1	W 5–0	1R; 0–1	F 4–1	2R; 1–1	QF; 2–1	1 / 6	13–5	72%
Malaysia Open	Absent				2R; 1–1	QF; 2–1	A	W 5–0	F 4–1	2R; 1–1	1 / 5	13–4	76%
Indonesia Open	Absent				2R; 1–1	F 4–1	W 5–0	W 5–0	2R; 1–1	2R; 1–1	2 / 6	17–4	81%
Denmark Open	Absent			QF; 2–1	QF; 2–1	QF; 2–1	QF; 2–1	W 5–0	W 5–0	A	2 / 6	18–4	82%
China Open	Q1; 0–1	QF; 3–1	SF; 5–1	2R; 1–1	SF; 3–1	W 5–0	W 5–0	A	W 5–0	A	3 / 8	27–5	84%
BWF World Superseries
India Open	NH	Absent				W 5–0	A	F 4–1	A	F 4–1	1 / 3	14–2	88%
Singapore Open	Absent			QF; 4–1	Absent		F 4–1	F 4–1	Absent		0 / 3	12–3	80%
Australian Open									QF; 2–1	SF; 3–1	0 / 2	5–2	71%
Japan Open	Absent						1R; 0–1	W 5–0	QF; 2–1	A	1 / 3	7–2	78%
Korea Open	Absent				1R; 0–1	QF; 2–1	1R; 0–1	A	QF; 2–1	A	0 / 4	4–4	50%
French Open	Absent			F 4–1	F 4–1	Absent		F 4–1	QF; 2–1	A	0 / 4	14–4	78%
Hong Kong Open	Absent					W 5–0	QF; 2–1	A	1R; 0–1	A	1 / 3	7–2	78%
BWF Grand Prix Gold and Grand Prix
Malaysia Masters	Not Held		Q1; 0–1	Absent							0 / 1	0–1	0%
German Open	Absent					W 5–0	QF; 2–1	Absent		W 5–0	2 / 3	12–1	92%
China Masters	Absent		1R; 1–1	2R; 1–1	1R; 0–1	QF; 1–1	SF; 3–1	Absent		W 5–0	1 / 6	11–5	69%
Chinese Taipei Open	Absent								F 4–1	A	0 / 1	4–1	80%
U.S. Open	Absent				QF; 2–1	Absent					0 / 1	2–1	67%
Thailand Open	Absent			NH	W 5–0	Absent		NH	Absent		1 / 1	5–0	100%
Bitburger Open	Absent			2R; 1–1	W 5–0	Absent					1 / 2	6–1	86%
Korea Open	Absent			F 4–1	SF; 3–1	Absent					0 / 2	7–2	78%
Macau Open	Absent		Q2; 1–1	W 5–0	SF; 3–1	Absent					1 / 3	9–2	82%
Career Statistics
	2007	2008	2009	2010	2011	2012	2013	2014	2015	2016			
Tournaments Played	1	1	4	9	14	15	14	12	14	10	94		
Titles	0	0	0	2	2	9	4	6	3	3	29		
Finals Reached	0	0	0	4	4	11	7	12	6	5	49		
Overall win–loss	0–1	3–1	7–4	30–7	32–12	58–5	39–10	52–6	36–11	34–7	291–64		
Win Percentage	0%	75%	64%	81%	73%	92%	80%	90%	77%	83%	81.97%		
Year End Ranking			146	11	9	1	1	1	3	8			

== Record against selected opponents ==
Record against year-end Finals finalists, World Championships semi-finalists, and Olympic quarter-finalists.

Players	Matches	Results		Difference
Players	Matches	Won	Lost	Difference
(Bulgaria) Petya Nedelcheva	2	2	0	+2
(China) He Bingjiao	5	2	3	–1
(China) Lu Lan	2	1	1	0
(China) Wang Lin	1	1	0	+1
(China) Wang Shixian	17	9	8	+1
(China) Wang Xin	7	1	6	–5
(China) Wang Yihan	18	8	10	–2
(China) Zhang Yiman	1	1	0	+1
(China) Zhu Lin	1	0	1	–1
(Chinese Taipei) Cheng Shao-chieh	3	2	1	+1
(Chinese Taipei) Tai Tzu-ying	14	11	3	+8
(Denmark) Tine Baun	3	2	1	+1
(France) Pi Hongyan	2	2	0	+2
(Germany) Juliane Schenk	7	6	1	+5
(Hong Kong) Wang Chen	1	1	0	+1
(Hong Kong) Yip Pui Yin	10	10	0	+10

Players	Matches	Results		Difference
Players	Matches	Won	Lost	Difference
(Hong Kong) Zhou Mi	1	1	0	+1
(India) Saina Nehwal	14	12	2	+10
(India) P. V. Sindhu	7	3	4	–1
(Indonesia) Maria Kristin Yulianti	1	1	0	+1
(Indonesia) Lindaweni Fanetri	7	6	1	+5
(Indonesia) Gregoria Mariska Tunjung	1	1	0	+1
(Japan) Minatsu Mitani	10	10	0	+10
(Japan) Nozomi Okuhara	6	2	4	–2
(Japan) Akane Yamaguchi	11	7	4	+3
(Japan) Aya Ohori	1	1	0	+1
(South Korea) An Se-young	1	0	1	–1
(South Korea) Bae Yeon-ju	10	8	2	+6
(South Korea) Sung Ji-hyun	14	13	1	+12
(Spain) Carolina Marín	6	3	3	0
(Thailand) Porntip Buranaprasertsuk	13	10	3	+7
(Thailand) Ratchanok Intanon	11	7	4	+3
