= 2014 Japan Super Series =

Tournament details
- Dates: 10—15 June 2014
- Level: Super Series
- Total prize money: US$250,000
- Venue: Tokyo Metropolitan Gymnasium
- Location: Tokyo, Japan

Champions
- Men's singles: (Malaysia) Lee Chong Wei
- Women's singles: (China) Li Xuerui
- Men's doubles: (South Korea) Lee Yong-dae (South Korea) Yoo Yeon-seong
- Women's doubles: (Japan) Misaki Matsutomo (Japan) Ayaka Takahashi
- Mixed doubles: (China) Zhang Nan (China) Zhao Yunlei

The 2014 Japan Super Series will be the sixth super series tournament of the 2014 BWF Super Series. The tournament took place in Tokyo, Japan from 10–15 June 2014 with a total purse of $250,000.

== Men's singles ==
=== Seeds ===
1. (Malaysia) Lee Chong Wei
2. (China) Chen Long
3. (Denmark) Jan Ø. Jørgensen
4. (Japan) Kenichi Tago
5. (Indonesia) Tommy Sugiarto
6. (South Korea) Shon Wan-ho
7. (Vietnam) Nguyen Tien Minh
8. (Hong Kong) Hu Yun

=== Top half ===
First Round
1	(Malaysia) Lee C W	21	21
Q4	(Chinese Taipei) Shih K-c	15	13
(India) Srikanth K.	21	13	8
(Germany) M Zwiebler	18	21	21
5	(Indonesia) T Sugiarto	21	21
(England) R Ouseph	10	15
(Japan) S Sasaki	9	21	21
(Denmark) V Axelsen	21	14	17
4	(Japan) K Tago	21	22	21
(South Korea) Lee D-k	12	24	8
(Hong Kong) Wei N	21	14	20
(India) S Varma	19	21	22
7	(Vietnam) Nguyen T M	21	21
PFQ	(Hong Kong) Wong W K	17	13
(Chinese Taipei) Hsu J-h	12	14
(Denmark) H-K Vittinghus	21	21

Second Round
1	(Malaysia) Lee C W	21	28
(Germany) M Zwiebler	13	26
5	(Indonesia) T Sugiarto	21	21
(Japan) S Sasaki	12	18
4	(Japan) K Tago	21	21
(India) S Varma	9	6
7	(Vietnam) Nguyen T M	12	11
(Denmark) H-K Vittinghus	21	21

Quarterfinals
1	(Malaysia) Lee C W	21	12	21
5	(Indonesia) T Sugiarto	15	21	17
4	(Japan) K Tago	21	16	21
(Denmark) H-K Vittinghus	16	21	13

Semifinals
1	(Malaysia) Lee C W	21	21
4	(Japan) K Tago	15	17

=== Bottom half ===
First Round
Q2	(China) Lin D	21	21
PFQ	(China) Xue S	15	18
(Malaysia) Chong W F	15	21	21
6	(South Korea) Shon W-h	21	17	15
(India) P Kashyap	21	23	18
Q1	(Japan) R Takeshita	15	25	21
(Japan) K Momota	21	20	12
3	(Denmark) J Ø Jørgensen	13	22	21
(India) R.M.V. Gurusai D	10	21	13
(Japan) T Ueda	21	15	21
(Chinese Taipei) Chou T-c	8	11
8	(Hong Kong) Hu Y	21	21
PFQ	(China) Gao H	21	21
Q3	(Japan) K Nishimoto	15	9
(Thailand) T Saensomboonsuk	16	18
2	(China) Chen L	21	21

Second Round
Q2	(China) Lin D	21	21
(Malaysia) Chong W F	14	14
Q1	(Japan) R Takeshita	13	12
3	(Denmark) J Ø Jørgensen	21	21
(Japan) T Ueda	19	17
8	(Hong Kong) Hu Y	21	21
PFQ	(China) Gao H	17	15
2	(China) Chen L	21	21

Quarterfinals
Q2	(China) Lin D	19	21	16
3	(Denmark) J Ø Jørgensen	21	13	21
8	(Hong Kong) Hu Y	18	21	21
2	(China) Chen L	21	19	15

Semifinals
3	(Denmark) J Ø Jørgensen	13	21	15
8	(Hong Kong) Hu Y	21	19	21

=== Finals ===
Semifinals
1	(Malaysia) Lee Chong Wei	21	21
4	(Japan) Kenichi Tago	15	17
3	(Denmark) Jan Ø. Jørgensen	13	21	15
8	(Hong Kong) Hu Yun	21	19	21

Final
1	(Malaysia) Lee Chong Wei	21	21
8	(Hong Kong) Hu Yun	14	12

== Women's singles ==
=== Seeds ===
1. (China) Li Xuerui
2. (China) Wang Yihan
3. (Thailand) Ratchanok Intanon
4. (South Korea) Sung Ji-hyun
5. (South Korea) Bae Yeon-ju
6. (Chinese Taipei) Tai Tzu-ying
7. (Thailand) Porntip Buranaprasertsuk
8. (Spain) Carolina Marín

=== Top half ===
First Round
1	(China) Li XR	17	21	21
Q3	(Japan) A Yamaguchi	21	19	18
(Japan) E Hirose	21	21
Q1	(Japan) A Mine	16	18
8	(Spain) C Marín	21	21
(Japan) M Mitani	11	16
(Thailand) B Ongbumrungpan	21	21
(Russia) K Polikarpova	9	7
4	(South Korea) Sung J-h	21	21	21
(Japan) Y Hashimoto	23	19	15
(China) Yao X	18	24	20
PFQ	(Japan) K Ito	21	22	22
7	(Thailand) P Buranaprasertsuk	21	21
Q4	(Chinese Taipei) Pai Y-p	17	17
(Japan) S Sato	21	21
(Chinese Taipei) Pai H-m	11	15

Second Round
1	(China) Li XR	21	21
(Japan) E Hirose	5	16
8	(Spain) C Marín	19	21	21
(Thailand) B Ongbumrungpan	21	14	14
4	(South Korea) Sung J-h	21	21
PFQ	(Japan) K Ito	16	8
7	(Thailand) P Buranaprasertsuk	21	21
(Japan) S Sato	19	16

Quarterfinals
1	(China) Li XR	21	21
8	(Spain) C Marín	14	12
4	(South Korea) Sung J-h	13	22	21
7	(Thailand) P Buranaprasertsuk	21	20	11

Semifinals
1	(China) Li XR	21	23
4	(South Korea) Sung J-h	15	21

=== Bottom half ===
First Round
(Japan) Y Kusunose	21	17	16
(Hong Kong) Yip P Y	19	21	21
(United States) Zhang BW	21	24
5	(South Korea) Bae Y-j	10	22
(Scotland) K Gilmour	21	11	17
(India) T Lad	13	21	21
(China) Liu X	21	14	21
3	(Thailand) R Intanon	11	21	16
(Thailand) N Jindapon	21	21
(Japan) K Imabeppu	19	13
(Czech Republic) K Gavnholt	15	14
6	(Chinese Taipei) Tai T-y	21	21
(Japan) S Takahashi	11	21	21
Q2	(Japan) H Suzuki	21	7	12
(Canada) M Li	11	17
2	(China) Wang YH	21	21

Second Round
(Hong Kong) Yip P Y	21	19	22
(United States) Zhang BW	15	21	20
(India) T Lad	18	12
(China) Liu X	21	21
(Thailand) N Jindapon	21	17
6	(Chinese Taipei) Tai T-y	23	21
(Japan) S Takahashi	21	21
2	(China) Wang YH	13	16

Quarterfinals
(Hong Kong) Yip P Y	21	13	14
(China) Liu X	19	21	21
6	(Chinese Taipei) Tai T-y	21	11
(Japan) S Takahashi	19	6^{r}

Semifinals
(China) Liu X	21	19	9
6	(Chinese Taipei) Tai T-y	15	21	21

=== Finals ===
Semifinals
1	(China) Li Xuerui	21	23
4	(South Korea) Sung Ji-hyun	15	21
(China) Liu Xin	21	19	9
6	(Chinese Taipei) Tai Tzu-ying	15	21	21

Final
1	(China) Li Xuerui	21	21
6	(Chinese Taipei) Tai Tzu-ying	16	6

== Men's doubles ==
=== Seeds ===
1. (Indonesia) Mohammad Ahsan / Hendra Setiawan
2. (Denmark) Mathias Boe / Carsten Mogensen
3. (Japan) Hiroyuki Endo / Kenichi Hayakawa
4. (South Korea) Kim Ki-jung / Kim Sa-rang
5. (South Korea) Lee Yong-dae / Yoo Yeon-seong
6. (Chinese Taipei) Lee Sheng-mu / Tsai Chia-hsin
7. (Malaysia) Hoon Thien How / Tan Wee Kiong
8. (England) Chris Adcock / Andrew Ellis

=== Top half ===
First Round
1	(Indonesia) M Ahsan (Indonesia) H Setiawan	16	21	21
(China) Kang J (China) Liu C	21	12	19
Q2	(Japan) H Saeki (Japan) R Taohata	18	27	19
(Japan) T Kamura (Japan) K Sonoda	21	25	21
7	(Malaysia) Hoon T H (Malaysia) Tan W K	12	21	24
(Hong Kong) Chan Y L (Hong Kong) Lee C H	21	11	22
(Russia) V Ivanov (Russia) I Sozonov	19	21	21
(Thailand) M Jongjit (Thailand) N Puangpuapech	21	18	23
4	(South Korea) Kim K-j (South Korea) Kim S-r	21	21
(Netherlands) J Arrends (Netherlands) J Maas	11	15
(Japan) H Hashimoto (Japan) N Hirata	21	21
(China) Li JH (China) Liu YC	12	10
6	(Chinese Taipei) Lee S-m (Chinese Taipei) Tsai C-h	21	21
Q1	(Japan) T Hoki (Japan) Y Kobayashi	14	10
(England) C Langridge (England) P Mills	13	22	18
(Denmark) M Conrad-Petersen (Denmark) M Pieler Kolding	21	20	21

Second Round
1	(Indonesia) M Ahsan (Indonesia) H Setiawan	21	21	21
(Japan) T Kamura (Japan) K Sonoda	23	12	15
7	(Malaysia) Hoon T H (Malaysia) Tan W K	21	21
(Thailand) M Jongjit (Thailand) N Puangpuapech	13	17
4	(South Korea) Kim K-j (South Korea) Kim S-r	16	24
(Japan) H Hashimoto (Japan) N Hirata	21	26
6	(Chinese Taipei) Lee S-m (Chinese Taipei) Tsai C-h	18	21	21
(Denmark) M Conrad-Petersen (Denmark) M Pieler Kolding	21	17	7

Quarterfinals
1	(Indonesia) M Ahsan (Indonesia) H Setiawan	21	21
7	(Malaysia) Hoon T H (Malaysia) Tan W K	16	19
(Japan) H Hashimoto (Japan) N Hirata	21	23
6	(Chinese Taipei) Lee S-m (Chinese Taipei) Tsai C-h	14	21

Semifinals
1	(Indonesia) M Ahsan (Indonesia) H Setiawan	21	21
(Japan) H Hashimoto (Japan) N Hirata	8	10

=== Bottom half ===
First Round
Q3	(Indonesia) A Y Chandra (Japan) S Ikeda	21	21
(Thailand) W Ampunsuwan (Thailand) P Chalardchaleam	12	18
(Denmark) A Skårup Rasmussen (Denmark) K Astrup Sorensen	17	12
5	(South Korea) Lee Y-d (South Korea) Yoo Y-s	21	21
(China) Wang YL (China) Zhang W	21	21
PFQ	(Indonesia) C Rusdianto (Indonesia) T Wardhana	10	18
(Malaysia) Goh V S (Malaysia) Tan B H	21	21
3	(Japan) H Endo (Japan) K Hayakawa	13	11
(Chinese Taipei) Chen H-l (Chinese Taipei) Lu C-p	21	13	21
(China) Chai B (China) Hong W	18	21	17
Q4	(Japan) T Inoue (Japan) Y Kaneko	13	17
8	(England) C Adcock (England) A Ellis	21	21
(Germany) M Fuchs (Germany) J Schöttler	1
(South Korea) Ko S-h (South Korea) Shin B-c	2^{r}
(Indonesia) A Pratama (Indonesia) R A Saputro	21	21
PFQ	(Japan) Y Komatsuzaki (Japan) H Takeuchi	19	12

Second Round
Q3	(Indonesia) A Y Chandra (Japan) S Ikeda	13	11
5	(South Korea) Lee Y-d (South Korea) Yoo Y-s	21	21
(China) Wang YL (China) Zhang W	21	21
(Malaysia) Goh V S (Malaysia) Tan B H	19	7
(Chinese Taipei) Chen H-l (Chinese Taipei) Lu C-p	17	21	21
8	(England) C Adcock (England) A Ellis	21	14	13
(Germany) M Fuchs (Germany) J Schöttler	21	11	18
(Indonesia) A Pratama (Indonesia) R A Saputro	5	21	21

Quarterfinals
5	(South Korea) Lee Y-d (South Korea) Yoo Y-s	21	21
(China) Wang YL (China) Zhang W	18	13
(Chinese Taipei) Chen H-l (Chinese Taipei) Lu C-p	19	19
(Indonesia) A Pratama (Indonesia) R A Saputro	21	21

Semifinals
5	(South Korea) Lee Y-d (South Korea) Yoo Y-s	21	21
(Indonesia) A Pratama (Indonesia) R A Saputro	16	14

=== Finals ===
Semifinals
1	(Indonesia) Mohammad Ahsan (Indonesia) Hendra Setiawan	21	21
(Japan) Hirokatsu Hashimoto (Japan) Noriyasu Hirata	8	10
5	(South Korea) Lee Yong-dae (South Korea) Yoo Yeon-seong	21	21
(Indonesia) Angga Pratama (Indonesia) Rian Agung Saputro	16	14

Final
1	(Indonesia) Mohammad Ahsan (Indonesia) Hendra Setiawan	12	24
5	(South Korea) Lee Yong-dae (South Korea) Yoo Yeon-seong	21	26

== Women's doubles ==
=== Seeds ===
1. (China) Bao Yixin / Tang Jinhua
2. (Denmark) Christinna Pedersen / Kamilla Rytter Juhl
3. (Japan) Misaki Matsutomo / Ayaka Takahashi
4. (Japan) Reika Kakiiwa / Miyuki Maeda
5. (South Korea) Jang Ye-na / Kim So-young
6. (South Korea) Jung Kyung-eun / Kim Ha-na
7. (Thailand) Duanganong Aroonkesorn / Kunchala Voravichitchaikul
8. (South Korea) Ko A-ra / Yoo Hae-won

=== Top half ===
First Round
1	(China) Bao YX (China) Tang JH	21	27
Q3	(Indonesia) S P Irawati (Indonesia) V Marissa	19	25
(England) H Olver (England) K Robertshaw	12	12
(Japan) S Matsuo (Japan) M Naito	21	21
6	(South Korea) Jung K-e (South Korea) Kim H-n	19	21	21
(Thailand) P Supajirakul (Thailand) S Taerattanachai	21	14	16
(Japan) A Kurihara (Japan) N Shinoya	18	16
(India) J Gutta (India) A Ponnappa	21	21
4	(Japan) R Kakiiwa (Japan) M Maeda	21	21
(Hong Kong) Chan T K (Hong Kong) Tse Y S	11	12
(Malaysia) Hoo V K M (Malaysia) Woon K W	12	21	21
Q2	(Japan) E Aman (Japan) H Suzuki	21	15	16
8	(South Korea) Go A-r (South Korea) Yoo H-w	21	12	13
(China) Ou DN (China) Xiong MJ	17	21	21
(Germany) I Herttrich (Germany) B Michels	18	10
(Japan) M Aratama (Japan) M Taruno	21	21

Second Round
1	(China) Bao YX (China) Tang JH	21	21
(Japan) S Matsuo (Japan) M Naito	10	18
6	(South Korea) Jung K-e (South Korea) Kim H-n	21	21	21
(India) J Gutta (India) A Ponnappa	12	23	19
4	(Japan) R Kakiiwa (Japan) M Maeda	21	21
(Malaysia) Hoo V K M (Malaysia) Woon K W	18	15
(China) Ou DN (China) Xiong MJ	21	17	21
(Japan) M Aratama (Japan) M Taruno	17	21	9

Quarterfinals
1	(China) Bao YX (China) Tang JH
6	(South Korea) Jung K-e (South Korea) Kim H-n	w	/	o
4	(Japan) R Kakiiwa (Japan) M Maeda	21	21
(China) Ou DN (China) Xiong MJ	15	15

Semifinals
6	(South Korea) Jung K-e (South Korea) Kim H-n	21	19	13
4	(Japan) R Kakiiwa (Japan) M Maeda	15	21	21

=== Bottom half ===
First Round
(Japan) Y Miki (Japan) K Yonemoto	21	22
(England) G Adcock (England) L Smith	12	20
Q4	(Japan) R Kawashima (Japan) S Ozaki	21	13	12
7	(Thailand) D Aroonkesorn (Thailand) K Voravichitchaikul	15	21	21
(Netherlands) E Muskens (Netherlands) S Piek	21	21
Q1	(Japan) M Ichimaru (Japan) S Tanaka	17	15
(China) Huan X (China) Zhong QX	21	18
3	(Japan) M Matsutomo (Japan) A Takahashi	23	21
(Japan) Y Fukushima (Japan) S Hirota	16	21	17
(Hong Kong) Chau H W (Hong Kong) Poon L Y	21	14	21
(United States) E Lee (United States) P L Obanana	22	9	8
5	(South Korea) Jang Y-n (South Korea) Kim S-y	20	21	21
(Chinese Taipei) Cheng W-h (Chinese Taipei) Hsieh P-c	19	18
(China) Ma J (China) Tang YT	21	21
(Japan) K Asumi (Japan) Y Miyauchi	16	8
2	(Denmark) C Pedersen (Denmark) K Rytter Juhl	21	21

Second Round
(Japan) Y Miki (Japan) K Yonemoto	15	21	21
7	(Thailand) D Aroonkesorn (Thailand) K Voravichitchaikul	21	13	10
(Netherlands) E Muskens (Netherlands) S Piek	19	18
3	(Japan) M Matsutomo (Japan) A Takahashi	21	21
(Hong Kong) Chau H W (Hong Kong) Poon L Y	13	13
5	(South Korea) Jang Y-n (South Korea) Kim S-y	21	21
(China) Ma J (China) Tang YT	25	21	21
2	(Denmark) C Pedersen (Denmark) K Rytter Juhl	27	14	13

Quarterfinals
(Japan) Y Miki (Japan) K Yonemoto	3^{r}
3	(Japan) M Matsutomo (Japan) A Takahashi	7
5	(South Korea) Jang Y-n (South Korea) Kim S-y	14	21	21
(China) Ma J (China) Tang YT	21	18	14

Semifinals
3	(Japan) M Matsutomo (Japan) A Takahashi	21	21
5	(South Korea) Jang Y-n (South Korea) Kim S-y	9	17

=== Finals ===
Semifinals
6	(South Korea) Jung Kyung-eun (South Korea) Kim Ha-na	21	19	13
4	(Japan) Reika Kakiiwa (Japan) Miyuki Maeda	15	21	21
3	(Japan) Misaki Matsutomo (Japan) Ayaka Takahashi	21	21
5	(South Korea) Jang Ye-na (South Korea) Kim So-young	9	17

Final
4	(Japan) Reika Kakiiwa (Japan) Miyuki Maeda	13	17
3	(Japan) Misaki Matsutomo (Japan) Ayaka Takahashi	21	21

== Mixed doubles ==
=== Seeds ===
1. (China) Zhang Nan / Zhao Yunlei
2. (England) Chris Adcock / Gabrielle Adcock
3. (South Korea) Ko Sung-hyun / Kim Ha-na
4. (Thailand) Sudket Prapakamol / Saralee Thoungthongkam
5. (Hong Kong) Lee Chun Hei / Chau Hoi Wah
6. (South Korea) Shin Baek-cheol / Jang Ye-na
7. (Indonesia) Riky Widianto / Puspita Richi Dili
8. (Germany) Michael Fuchs / Birgit Michels

=== Top half ===
First Round
1	(China) Zhang N (China) Zhao YL	21	21
(England) C Langridge (England) H Olver	17	18
(Denmark) A Kristiansen (Denmark) J Houmann	18	11
(Malaysia) Chan P S (Malaysia) Lai P J	21	21
6	(South Korea) Shin B-c (South Korea) Jang Y-n	9	12
(Thailand) N Puangpuapech (Thailand) P Supajirakul	21	21
(Hong Kong) Chan Y L (Hong Kong) Tse Y S	21	12	12
(Indonesia) M Rijal (Indonesia) V Marissa	13	21	21
4	(Thailand) S Prapakamol (Thailand) S Thoungthongkam	10	20
(Japan) K Hayakawa (Japan) M Matsutomo	21	22
(Germany) P Käsbauer (Germany) I Herttrich	21	18	17
(India) T Kona (India) A Ponnappa	18	21	21
7	(Indonesia) R Widianto (Indonesia) P R Dili	19	17
(China) Li JH (China) Tang YT	21	21
(South Korea) Kim K-j (South Korea) Kim S-y	16	21	19
(Hong Kong) F Kurniawan (Hong Kong) Poon L Y	21	19	21

Second Round
1	(China) Zhang N (China) Zhao YL	21	21
(Malaysia) Chan P S (Malaysia) Lai P J	16	9
(Thailand) N Puangpuapech (Thailand) P Supajirakul	14	12
(Indonesia) M Rijal (Indonesia) V Marissa	21	21
(Japan) K Hayakawa (Japan) M Matsutomo	21	21
(India) T Kona (India) A Ponnappa	17	11
(China) Li JH (China) Tang YT	21	21
(Hong Kong) F Kurniawan (Hong Kong) Poon L Y	16	11

Quarterfinals
1	(China) Zhang N (China) Zhao YL	16	21	21
(Indonesia) M Rijal (Indonesia) V Marissa	21	14	19
(Japan) K Hayakawa (Japan) M Matsutomo	21	21
(China) Li JH (China) Tang YT	16	14

Semifinals
1	(China) Zhang N (China) Zhao YL	21	21
(Japan) K Hayakawa (Japan) M Matsutomo	14	13

=== Bottom half ===
First Round
(China) Liu C (China) Bao YX	21	16	21
(Chinese Taipei) Chen H-l (Chinese Taipei) Cheng W-h	6	21	14
(Scotland) R Blair (Scotland) I Bankier	19	14
8	(Germany) M Fuchs (Germany) B Michels	21	21
Q3	(Japan) Y Watanabe (Japan) A Higashino	12	18
Q1	(Japan) R Taohata (Japan) K Yonemoto	21	21
Q2	(China) Wang Y (China) Ou D	21	10	15
3	(South Korea) Ko S-h (South Korea) Kim H-n	16	21	21
(Japan) H Hashimoto (Japan) M Maeda	18	22	17
(Indonesia) P Jordan (Indonesia) D Susanto	21	20	21
(Netherlands) J Arends (Netherlands) S Piek	21	19	24
5	(Hong Kong) Lee C H (Hong Kong) Chau H W	15	21	26
(Denmark) M Pieler Kolding (Denmark) K Rytter Juhl	21	21
(Thailand) M Jongjit (Thailand) S Taerattanachai	18	8
Q4	(Japan) K Kazuno (Japan) Y Miyauchi	21	8	15
2	(England) C Adcock (England) G Adcock	17	21	21

Second Round
(China) Liu C (China) Bao YX	18	25	19
8	(Germany) M Fuchs (Germany) B Michels	21	23	21
Q1	(Japan) R Taohata (Japan) K Yonemoto	19	21	16
3	(South Korea) Ko S-h (South Korea) Kim H-n	21	16	21
(Indonesia) P Jordan (Indonesia) D Susanto	15	11
5	(Hong Kong) Lee C H (Hong Kong) Chau H W	21	21
(Denmark) M Pieler Kolding (Denmark) K Rytter Juhl	18	13
2	(England) C Adcock (England) G Adcock	21	21

Quarterfinals
8	(Germany) M Fuchs (Germany) B Michels	21	22
3	(South Korea) Ko S-h (South Korea) Kim H-n	12	20
5	(Hong Kong) Lee C H (Hong Kong) Chau H W	15	21	21
2	(England) C Adcock (England) G Adcock	21	19	17

Semifinals
8	(Germany) M Fuchs (Germany) B Michels	21	21
5	(Hong Kong) Lee C H (Hong Kong) Chau H W	19	10

=== Finals ===
Semifinals
1	(China) Zhang Nan (China) Zhao Yunlei	21	21
(Japan) Kenichi Hayakawa (Japan) Misaki Matsutomo	14	13
8	(Germany) Michael Fuchs (Germany) Birgit Michels	21	21
5	(Hong Kong) Lee Chun Hei (Hong Kong) Chau Hoi Wah	19	10

Final
1	(China) Zhang Nan (China) Zhao Yunlei	21	21
8	(Germany) Michael Fuchs (Germany) Birgit Michels	12	16

Preceded by 2013 Japan Super Series	Japan Open	Succeeded by 2015 Japan Super Series
Preceded by 2014 Singapore Super Series	BWF Super Series; 2014 season	Succeeded by 2014 Indonesia Super Series Premier
