= 2018 Malaysia Masters =

2018 badminton tournament in Kuala Lumpur

Tournament details
- Dates: 16–21 January
- Level: Super 500
- Total prize money: US$350,000
- Venue: Axiata Arena
- Location: Kuala Lumpur, Malaysia

Champions
- Men's singles: (Denmark) Viktor Axelsen
- Women's singles: (Thailand) Ratchanok Intanon
- Men's doubles: (Indonesia) Fajar Alfian (Indonesia) M. Rian Ardianto
- Women's doubles: (Denmark) Kamilla Rytter Juhl (Denmark) Christinna Pedersen
- Mixed doubles: (Hong Kong) Tang Chun Man (Hong Kong) Tse Ying Suet

The 2018 Malaysia Masters, officially the Perodua Malaysia Masters 2018, was a badminton tournament which took place at Axiata Arena in Malaysia from 16 to 21 January 2018 and had a total purse of $350,000.

== Tournament ==
The 2018 Malaysia Masters was the second tournament of the 2018 BWF World Tour and also part of the Malaysia Masters championships which had been held since 2009. This tournament was organized by the Badminton Association of Malaysia with the sanction from the BWF. It was also the first ever new Super 500 Level 4 tournament of the BWF World Tour schedule.

=== Venue ===
This international tournament was held at Axiata Arena in Kuala Lumpur, Malaysia.

=== Point distribution ===
Below is a table with the point distribution for each phase of the tournament based on the BWF points system for the BWF World Tour Super 500 event.

Winner	Runner-up	3/4	5/8	9/16	17/32	33/64	65/128
9,200	7,800	6,420	5,040	3,600	2,220	880	430

=== Prize money ===
The total prize money for this tournament was US$350,000. Distribution of prize money was in accordance with BWF regulations.

Event	Winner	Finals	Semifinals	Quarterfinals	Last 16
Singles	$26,250	$13,300	$5,075	$2,100	$1,225
Doubles	$27,650	$13,300	$4,900	$2,537.50	$1,312.50

== Men's singles ==
=== Seeds ===
1. (Denmark) Viktor Axelsen (champion)
2. (Malaysia) Lee Chong Wei (first round)
3. (China) Chen Long (first round)
4. (South Korea) Son Wan-ho (first round)
5. (China) Lin Dan (first round)
6. (Chinese Taipei) Chou Tien-chen (first round)
7. (Hong Kong) Ng Ka Long (quarterfinals)
8. (Chinese Taipei) Wang Tzu-wei (second round)

=== Finals ===
Semifinals
1	(Denmark) Viktor Axelsen	21	21
Q4	(Malaysia) Liew Daren	15	11
(Denmark) Hans-Kristian Vittinghus	14	19
(Japan) Kenta Nishimoto	21	21

Final
1	(Denmark) Viktor Axelsen	21	21	21
(Japan) Kenta Nishimoto	13	23	18

=== Top half ===
==== Section 1 ====
First Round
1	(Denmark) V Axelsen	18	21	21
(South Korea) Lee H-i	21	14	5
Q2	(Thailand) K Wangcharoen	13	13
(India) B. Sai Praneeth	21	21
6	(Chinese Taipei) Chou T-c	11	22
(Indonesia) J Christie	21	24
(Denmark) E Holst	12	18
(Malaysia) Lee Z J	21	21

Second Round
1	(Denmark) V Axelsen	21	21
(India) B. Sai Praneeth	17	8
(Indonesia) J Christie	19	21	21
(Malaysia) Lee Z J	21	14	15

Quarterfinals
1	(Denmark) V Axelsen	21	19	21
(Indonesia) J Christie	15	21	12

==== Section 2 ====
First Round
4	(South Korea) Son W-h	15	13
Q4	(Malaysia) Liew D	21	21
(South Korea) Jeon H-j	22	16	22
(Indonesia) T Sugiarto	20	21	20
5	(China) Lin D	16	21	17
PFQ	(Indonesia) I M Mustofa	21	18	21
PFQ	(Thailand) S Avihingsanon	21	21
(Brazil) Y Coelho	14	19

Second Round
Q4	(Malaysia) Liew D	21	19	21
(South Korea) Jeon H-j	17	21	16
PFQ	(Indonesia) I M Mustofa	21	19	19
PFQ	(Thailand) S Avihingsanon	7	21	21

Quarterfinals
Q4	(Malaysia) Liew D	21	21
PFQ	(Thailand) S Avihingsanon	18	17

=== Bottom half ===
==== Section 3 ====
First Round
(Denmark) H-K Vittinghus	21	21
(Hong Kong) Wong W K	11	14
(Japan) K Sakai	12	21	11
8	(Chinese Taipei) Wang T-w	21	15	21
Q1	(Malaysia) I Zulkarnain	10	21	9
(Denmark) A Antonsen	21	11	21
(Indonesia) A S Ginting	21	21
3	(China) Chen L	17	15

Second Round
(Denmark) H-K Vittinghus	16	24	21
8	(Chinese Taipei) Wang T-w	21	22	12
(Denmark) A Antonsen	14	14
(Indonesia) A S Ginting	21	21

Quarterfinals
(Denmark) H-K Vittinghus	21	21
(Indonesia) A S Ginting	19	16

==== Section 4 ====
First Round
Q3	(Malaysia) Soong J V	8	12
(France) B Leverdez	21	21
(Malaysia) Chong W F	15	11
7	(Hong Kong) Ng K L	21	21
(China) Huang YX	21	21
(Denmark) R Gemke	12	11
(Japan) K Nishimoto	19	21	21
2	(Malaysia) Lee C W	21	18	19

Second Round
(France) B Leverdez	13	15
7	(Hong Kong) Ng K L	21	21
(China) Huang YX	12	20
(Japan) K Nishimoto	21	22

Quarterfinals
7	(Hong Kong) Ng K L	21	19	16
(Japan) K Nishimoto	18	21	21

== Women's singles ==
=== Seeds ===
1. (Chinese Taipei) Tai Tzu-ying (final)
2. (Japan) Akane Yamaguchi (semifinals)
3. (India) P. V. Sindhu (withdrew)
4. (Spain) Carolina Marín (semifinals)
5. (Thailand) Ratchanok Intanon (champion)
6. (South Korea) Sung Ji-hyun (first round)
7. (Japan) Nozomi Okuhara (withdrew)
8. (China) Chen Yufei (quarterfinals)

=== Finals ===
Semifinals
1	(Chinese Taipei) Tai Tzu-ying	12	21	23
4	(Spain) Carolina Marín	21	15	21
5	(Thailand) Ratchanok Intanon	21	16	21
2	(Japan) Akane Yamaguchi	15	21	19

Final
1	(Chinese Taipei) Tai Tzu-ying	16	21	22
5	(Thailand) Ratchanok Intanon	21	14	24

=== Top half ===
==== Section 1 ====
First Round
1	(Chinese Taipei) Tai T-y	18	21	21
(Malaysia) S Cheah S Y	21	12	12
(Thailand) B Ongbumrungpan	18	21	13
(Canada) M Li	21	16	21
8	(China) Chen YF	21	21
(Chinese Taipei) Lee C-h	7	8
(China) Chen XX	16	17
(South Korea) Lee J-m	21	21

Second Round
1	(Chinese Taipei) Tai T-y	21	21
(Canada) M Li	12	10
8	(China) Chen YF	19	21	21
(South Korea) Lee J-m	21	10	14

Quarterfinals
1	(Chinese Taipei) Tai T-y	21	21
8	(China) Chen YF	18	15

==== Section 2 ====
First Round
4	(Spain) C Marín	21	21
Q4	(Singapore) G Chua	17	10
PFQ	(Denmark) M Poulsen	21	19	21
(Chinese Taipei) Chiang M-h	14	21	12
6	(South Korea) Sung J-h	15	13
(Japan) A Ohori	21	21
(Russia) E Kosetskaya	17	21
Q3	(Malaysia) Lee Y Y	21	23

Second Round
4	(Spain) C Marín	21	21
PFQ	(Denmark) M Poulsen	15	11
(Japan) A Ohori	18	21	11
Q3	(Malaysia) Lee Y Y	21	17	21

Quarterfinals
4	(Spain) C Marín	21	21
Q3	(Malaysia) Lee Y Y	17	16

=== Bottom half ===
==== Section 3 ====
First Round
(Scotland) K Gilmour	21	20	21
(Denmark) M Blichfeldt	17	22	17
(Indonesia) Fitriani	14	12
5	(Thailand) R Intanon	21	21
(Chinese Taipei) Pai Y-p	21	21
(Denmark) L Kjærsfeldt	11	17
(Indonesia) H Ramadini	15	19
PFQ	(Malaysia) Goh J W	21	21

Second Round
(Scotland) K Gilmour	21	23	14
5	(Thailand) R Intanon	9	25	21
(Chinese Taipei) Pai Y-p	11	11
PFQ	(Malaysia) Goh J W	21	21

Quarterfinals
5	(Thailand) R Intanon	21	21	21
PFQ	(Malaysia) Goh J W	23	6	10

==== Section 4 ====
First Round
(Japan) S Sato	21	21
(Thailand) P Chochuwong	17	14
(China) He BJ	w	/	o
PFQ	(Chinese Taipei) Chen S-y
(Thailand) N Jindapol	21	21
Q2	(France) D Lansac	10	15
Q1	(Malaysia) Lim Y F	18	21	12
2	(Japan) A Yamaguchi	21	17	21

Second Round
(Japan) S Sato	21	15	14
(China) He BJ	9	21	21
(Thailand) N Jindapol	21	19	18
2	(Japan) A Yamaguchi	18	21	21

Quarterfinals
(China) He BJ	15	14
2	(Japan) A Yamaguchi	21	21

== Men's doubles ==
=== Seeds ===
1. (Denmark) Mathias Boe / Carsten Mogensen (withdrew)
2. (China) Li Junhui / Liu Yuchen (quarterfinals)
3. (China) Liu Cheng / Zhang Nan (quarterfinals)
4. (Japan) Takeshi Kamura / Keigo Sonoda (second round)
5. (Denmark) Mads Conrad-Petersen / Mads Pieler Kolding (semifinals)
6. (Chinese Taipei) Lee Jhe-huei / Lee Yang (first round)
7. (Russia) Vladimir Ivanov / Ivan Sozonov (first round)
8. (Chinese Taipei) Chen Hung-ling / Wang Chi-lin (semifinals)

=== Finals ===
Semifinals
8	(Chinese Taipei) Chen Hung-ling (Chinese Taipei) Wang Chi-lin	16	17
(Malaysia) Goh V Shem (Malaysia) Tan Wee Kiong	21	21
(Indonesia) Fajar Alfian (Indonesia) Muhammad Rian Ardianto	15	21	21
5	(Denmark) Mads Conrad-Petersen (Denmark) Mads Pieler Kolding	21	16	17

Final
(Malaysia) Goh V Shem (Malaysia) Tan Wee Kiong	21	22	13
(Indonesia) Fajar Alfian (Indonesia) Muhammad Rian Ardianto	14	24	21

=== Top half ===
==== Section 1 ====
First Round
PFQ	(France) B Kersaudy (France) J Maio	18	18
(Chinese Taipei) Liao M-c (Chinese Taipei) Su C-h	21	21
Q2	(Malaysia) A Chia (Malaysia) Soh W Y	12	11
(Indonesia) B Angriawan (Indonesia) Hardianto	21	21
8	(Chinese Taipei) Chen H-l (Chinese Taipei) Wang C-l	21	12	21
Q3	(Chinese Taipei) Lee S-m (Chinese Taipei) Yang P-hs	16	21	15
(China) Lu K (China) Wang YL	21	21
(Malaysia) Goh S F (Malaysia) N Izzuddin	17	18

Second Round
(Chinese Taipei) Liao M-c (Chinese Taipei) Su C-h	18	21	22
(Indonesia) B Angriawan (Indonesia) Hardianto	21	14	20
8	(Chinese Taipei) Chen H-l (Chinese Taipei) Wang C-l	21	20	21
(China) Lu K (China) Wang YL	18	22	16

Quarterfinals
(Chinese Taipei) Liao M-c (Chinese Taipei) Su C-h	19	19
8	(Chinese Taipei) Chen H-l (Chinese Taipei) Wang C-l	21	21

==== Section 2 ====
First Round
3	(China) Liu C (China) Zhang N	21	21
(Malaysia) Chooi K M (Malaysia) Low J S	14	16
(Japan) H Endo (Japan) Y Watanabe	21	21
PFQ	(Hong Kong) Law C H (Hong Kong) Or C C	11	12
7	(Russia) V Ivanov (Russia) I Sozonov	20	20
(Malaysia) Goh V S (Malaysia) Tan W K	22	22
(Malaysia) Ong Y S (Malaysia) Teo E Y	21	21
Q4	(Malaysia) Lim K W (South Korea) Yoo Y-s	15	18

Second Round
3	(China) Liu C (China) Zhang N	21	21
(Japan) H Endo (Japan) Y Watanabe	11	13
(Malaysia) Goh V S (Malaysia) Tan W K	21	21
(Malaysia) Ong Y S (Malaysia) Teo E Y	17	17

Quarterfinals
3	(China) Liu C (China) Zhang N	21	18	18
(Malaysia) Goh V S (Malaysia) Tan W K	12	21	21

=== Bottom half ===
==== Section 3 ====
First Round
(Denmark) K Astrup (Denmark) A S Rasmussen	16	19
(Hong Kong) Lee C H (Hong Kong) Tang C M	21	21
(Thailand) K Kedren (Thailand) D Puavaranukroh	11	21	21
6	(Chinese Taipei) Lee J-h (Chinese Taipei) Lee Y	21	18	16
(Indonesia) F Alfian (Indonesia) M R Ardianto	21	21
PFQ	(Denmark) K Antonsen (Denmark) N Nøhr	15	19
(Denmark) M Christiansen (Denmark) D Daugaard	11	9
4	(Japan) T Kamura (Japan) K Sonoda	21	21

Second Round
(Hong Kong) Lee C H (Hong Kong) Tang C M	21	16	19
(Thailand) K Kedren (Thailand) D Puavaranukroh	15	21	21
(Indonesia) F Alfian (Indonesia) M R Ardianto	21	21
4	(Japan) T Kamura (Japan) K Sonoda	17	17

Quarterfinals
(Thailand) K Kedren (Thailand) D Puavaranukroh	18	13
(Indonesia) F Alfian (Indonesia) M R Ardianto	21	21

==== Section 4 ====
First Round
Q1	(Indonesia) H A Gunawan (Indonesia) M Kido	15	22
(Indonesia) W Nayaka (Indonesia) A Y Santoso	21	24
(Netherlands) J Arends (Netherlands) R Jille	21	17	19
5	(Denmark) M Conrad-Petersen (Denmark) M P Kolding	18	21	21
(Chinese Taipei) Lu C-y (Chinese Taipei) Yang P-ha	21	13	21
(Canada) J Ho-Shue (Canada) N Yakura	14	21	8
(Japan) T Inoue (Japan) Y Kaneko	17	14
2	(China) Li JH (China) Liu YC	21	21

Second Round
(Indonesia) W Nayaka (Indonesia) A Y Santoso	17	15
5	(Denmark) M Conrad-Petersen (Denmark) M P Kolding	21	21
(Chinese Taipei) Lu C-y (Chinese Taipei) Yang P-ha	21	19	14
2	(China) Li JH (China) Liu YC	18	21	21

Quarterfinals
5	(Denmark) M Conrad-Petersen (Denmark) M P Kolding	21	21
2	(China) Li JH (China) Liu YC	16	16

== Women's doubles ==
=== Seeds ===
1. (China) Chen Qingchen / Jia Yifan (final)
2. (Japan) Misaki Matsutomo / Ayaka Takahashi (quarterfinals)
3. (Denmark) Kamilla Rytter Juhl / Christinna Pedersen (champions)
4. (Japan) Yuki Fukushima / Sayaka Hirota (semifinals)
5. (South Korea) Lee So-hee / Shin Seung-chan (semifinals)
6. (South Korea) Chang Ye-na / Jung Kyung-eun (second round)
7. (China) Tang Jinhua / Yu Xiaohan (quarterfinals)
8. (Malaysia) Vivian Hoo / Woon Khe Wei (second round)

=== Finals ===
Semifinals
1	(China) Chen Qingchen (China) Jia Yifan	15	21	21
4	(Japan) Yuki Fukushima (Japan) Sayaka Hirota	21	15	14
3	(Denmark) Kamilla Rytter Juhl (Denmark) Christinna Pedersen	21	21
5	(South Korea) Lee So-hee (South Korea) Shin Seung-chan	15	18

Final
1	(China) Chen Qingchen (China) Jia Yifan	20	18
3	(Denmark) Kamilla Rytter Juhl (Denmark) Christinna Pedersen	22	21

=== Top half ===
==== Section 1 ====
First Round
1	(China) Chen QC (China) Jia YF	21	21
(United States) A Lee (United States) S Lee	4	6
(Malaysia) Soong F C (Malaysia) Tee J Y	21	21
(China) Liu XX (China) Zhou CM	16	18
6	(South Korea) Chang Y-n (South Korea) Jung K-e	21	21
Q4	(Malaysia) Lim C S (Malaysia) Yap Z	17	15
(Chinese Taipei) Hsu Y-c (Chinese Taipei) Wu T-j	14	17
(South Korea) Chae Y-j (South Korea) Kim H-r	21	21

Second Round
1	(China) Chen QC (China) Jia YF	21	21
(Malaysia) Soong F C (Malaysia) Tee J Y	12	13
6	(South Korea) Chang Y-n (South Korea) Jung K-e	19	14
(South Korea) Chae Y-j (South Korea) Kim H-r	21	21

Quarterfinals
1	(China) Chen QC (China) Jia YF	19	21	21
(South Korea) Chae Y-j (South Korea) Kim H-r	21	17	9

==== Section 2 ====
First Round
4	(Japan) Y Fukushima (Japan) S Hirota	21	21
Q3	(Indonesia) Z F Azka (Indonesia) B M Rumambi	7	10
(Indonesia) A S Awanda (Indonesia) N K M Istarani	21	21
(Netherlands) S Piek (Netherlands) C Seinen	12	13
8	(Malaysia) V Hoo (Malaysia) Woon K W	21	21
(Chinese Taipei) Lin X-m (Chinese Taipei) Wu F-c	18	17
(China) Huang DP (China) Li WM	21	21
(Denmark) J Finne-Ipsen (Denmark) R Søby Hansen	10	7

Second Round
4	(Japan) Y Fukushima (Japan) S Hirota	21	22
(Indonesia) A S Awanda (Indonesia) N K M Istarani	15	20
8	(Malaysia) V Hoo (Malaysia) Woon K W	14	18
(China) Huang DP (China) Li WM	21	21

Quarterfinals
4	(Japan) Y Fukushima (Japan) S Hirota	21	21
(China) Huang DP (China) Li WM	17	16

=== Bottom half ===
==== Section 3 ====
First Round
(Malaysia) Lim Y L (Malaysia) Yap C W	21	21
(Thailand) S Paewsampran (Thailand) K Sudjaipraparat	17	17
(Denmark) M Fruergaard (Denmark) S Thygesen	17	15
7	(China) Tang JH (China) Yu XH	21	21
(India) A Ponnappa (India) N. S Reddy	21	21
(Germany) J Goliszewski (Germany) L Käpplein	15	12
(Australia) S Mapasa (Australia) G Somerville	15	17
3	(Denmark) K R Juhl (Denmark) C Pedersen	21	21

Second Round
(Malaysia) Lim Y L (Malaysia) Yap C W	14	18
7	(China) Tang JH (China) Yu XH	21	21
(India) A Ponnappa (India) N. S Reddy	15	15
3	(Denmark) K R Juhl (Denmark) C Pedersen	21	21

Quarterfinals
7	(China) Tang JH (China) Yu XH	16	11
3	(Denmark) K R Juhl (Denmark) C Pedersen	21	21

==== Section 4 ====
First Round
Q2	(Malaysia) Goh Y C (Malaysia) Teoh M X	15	15
(Malaysia) Chow M K (Malaysia) Lee M Y	21	21
(Indonesia) K N Hanadia (Indonesia) D T Permatasari	9	8
5	(South Korea) Lee S-h (South Korea) Shin S-c	21	21
(Chinese Taipei) Chiang K-h (Chinese Taipei) Hung S-h	16	21	21
(Indonesia) Y Barkah (Indonesia) N K Maheswari	21	14	14
Q1	(Singapore) Ong R N (Singapore) C Wong	10	12
2	(Japan) M Matsutomo (Japan) A Takahashi	21	21

Second Round
(Malaysia) Chow M K (Malaysia) Lee M Y	18	12
5	(South Korea) Lee S-h (South Korea) Shin S-c	21	21
(Chinese Taipei) Chiang K-h (Chinese Taipei) Hung S-h	15	11
2	(Japan) M Matsutomo (Japan) A Takahashi	21	21

Quarterfinals
5	(South Korea) Lee S-h (South Korea) Shin S-c	22	22	21
2	(Japan) M Matsutomo (Japan) A Takahashi	24	20	14

== Mixed doubles ==
=== Seeds ===
1. (China) Wang Yilyu / Huang Dongping (quarterfinals)
2. (Hong Kong) Tang Chun Man / Tse Ying Suet (champions)
3. (South Korea) Seo Seung-jae / Kim Ha-na (quarterfinals)
4. (Malaysia) Tan Kian Meng / Lai Pei Jing (quarterfinals)
5. (China) Zheng Siwei / Huang Yaqiong (final)
6. (Denmark) Mathias Christiansen / Christinna Pedersen (second round)
7. (Hong Kong) Lee Chun Hei / Chau Hoi Wah (second round)
8. (Malaysia) Goh Soon Huat / Shevon Jemie Lai (semifinals)

=== Finals ===
Semifinals
5	(China) Zheng Siwei (China) Huang Yaqiong	21	21
(Indonesia) Hafiz Faizal (Indonesia) Gloria Emanuelle Widjaja	13	16
8	(Malaysia) Goh Soon Huat (Malaysia) Shevon Jemie Lai	21	12	13
2	(Hong Kong) Tang Chun Man (Hong Kong) Tse Ying Suet	14	21	21

Final
5	(China) Zheng Siwei (China) Huang Yaqiong	21	20	18
2	(Hong Kong) Tang Chun Man (Hong Kong) Tse Ying Suet	19	22	21

=== Top half ===
==== Section 1 ====
First Round
1	(China) Wang YL (China) Huang DP	21	21
Q1	(Indonesia) Y E Saputra (Indonesia) M G Islami	7	9
(Russia) V Durkin (Russia) N Vislova	21	9	18
(Chinese Taipei) Lee Y (Chinese Taipei) Hsu Y-c	18	21	21
5	(China) Zheng SW (China) Huang YQ	18	23	21
(Denmark) N Nøhr (Denmark) S Thygesen	21	21	15
(Japan) Y Watanabe (Japan) A Higashino	23	16
(Indonesia) P Jordan (Indonesia) M D Oktavianti	25	21

Second Round
1	(China) Wang YL (China) Huang DP	21	21
(Chinese Taipei) Lee Y (Chinese Taipei) Hsu Y-c	14	12
5	(China) Zheng SW (China) Huang YQ	21	21
(Indonesia) P Jordan (Indonesia) M D Oktavianti	16	12

Quarterfinals
1	(China) Wang YL (China) Huang DP	12	19
5	(China) Zheng SW (China) Huang YQ	21	21

==== Section 2 ====
First Round
3	(South Korea) Seo S-j (South Korea) Kim H-n	21	22
(France) R Labar (France) A Fontaine	9	20
(South Korea) Choi S-g (South Korea) Chae Y-j	21	21
Q2	(China) Zhang N (China) Liu XX	16	18
7	(Hong Kong) Lee C H (Hong Kong) Chau H W	21	21
(India) P Chopra (India) N. S Reddy	18	17
(Chinese Taipei) Lu C-y (Chinese Taipei) Chiang K-h	17	17
(Indonesia) H Faizal (Indonesia) G E Widjaja	21	21

Second Round
3	(South Korea) Seo S-j (South Korea) Kim H-n	18	21	21
(South Korea) Choi S-g (South Korea) Chae Y-j	21	19	18
7	(Hong Kong) Lee C H (Hong Kong) Chau H W	17	10
(Indonesia) H Faizal (Indonesia) G E Widjaja	21	21

Quarterfinals
3	(South Korea) Seo S-j (South Korea) Kim H-n	21	15	18
(Indonesia) H Faizal (Indonesia) G E Widjaja	18	21	21

=== Bottom half ===
==== Section 3 ====
First Round
(Netherlands) R Tabeling (Netherlands) C Seinen	17	12
(Chinese Taipei) Wang C-l (Chinese Taipei) Lee C-h	21	21
(Netherlands) J Arends (Netherlands) S Piek	17	17
8	(Malaysia) Goh S H (Malaysia) S J Lai	21	21
Q3	(Malaysia) Chen T J (Malaysia) Cheah Y S	19	21	11
(Thailand) D Puavaranukroh (Thailand) P Supajirakul	21	19	21
(Denmark) A S Rasmussen (Denmark) L Kjærsfeldt	21	16	14
4	(Malaysia) Tan K M (Malaysia) Lai P J	11	21	21

Second Round
(Chinese Taipei) Wang C-l (Chinese Taipei) Lee C-h	16	8
8	(Malaysia) Goh S H (Malaysia) S J Lai	21	21
(Thailand) D Puavaranukroh (Thailand) P Supajirakul	16	17
4	(Malaysia) Tan K M (Malaysia) Lai P J	21	21

Quarterfinals
8	(Malaysia) Goh S H (Malaysia) S J Lai	21	21
4	(Malaysia) Tan K M (Malaysia) Lai P J	14	15

==== Section 4 ====
First Round
(Malaysia) Chan P S (Malaysia) Goh L Y	21	21
PFQ	(France) B Kersaudy (France) L Palermo	11	17
(China) Lu K (China) Zhou CM	13	18
6	(Denmark) M Christiansen (Denmark) C Pedersen	21	21
(Malaysia) Y Khrishnan (India) P Sawant	w	/	o
(Australia) S Serasinghe (Australia) S Mapasa
Q4	(Indonesia) R K Suwardi (Indonesia) D Susanto	19	19
2	(Hong Kong) Tang C M (Hong Kong) Tse Y S	21	21

Second Round
(Malaysia) Chan P S (Malaysia) Goh L Y	21	13	21
6	(Denmark) M Christiansen (Denmark) C Pedersen	18	21	18
(Malaysia) Y Khrishnan (India) P Sawant	24	12
2	(Hong Kong) Tang C M (Hong Kong) Tse Y S	26	21

Quarterfinals
(Malaysia) Chan P S (Malaysia) Goh L Y	13	16
2	(Hong Kong) Tang C M (Hong Kong) Tse Y S	21	21

Preceded by 2018 Thailand Masters	BWF World Tour; 2018 BWF season	Succeeded by 2018 Indonesia Masters
