= Sourabh Verma =

Indian badminton player

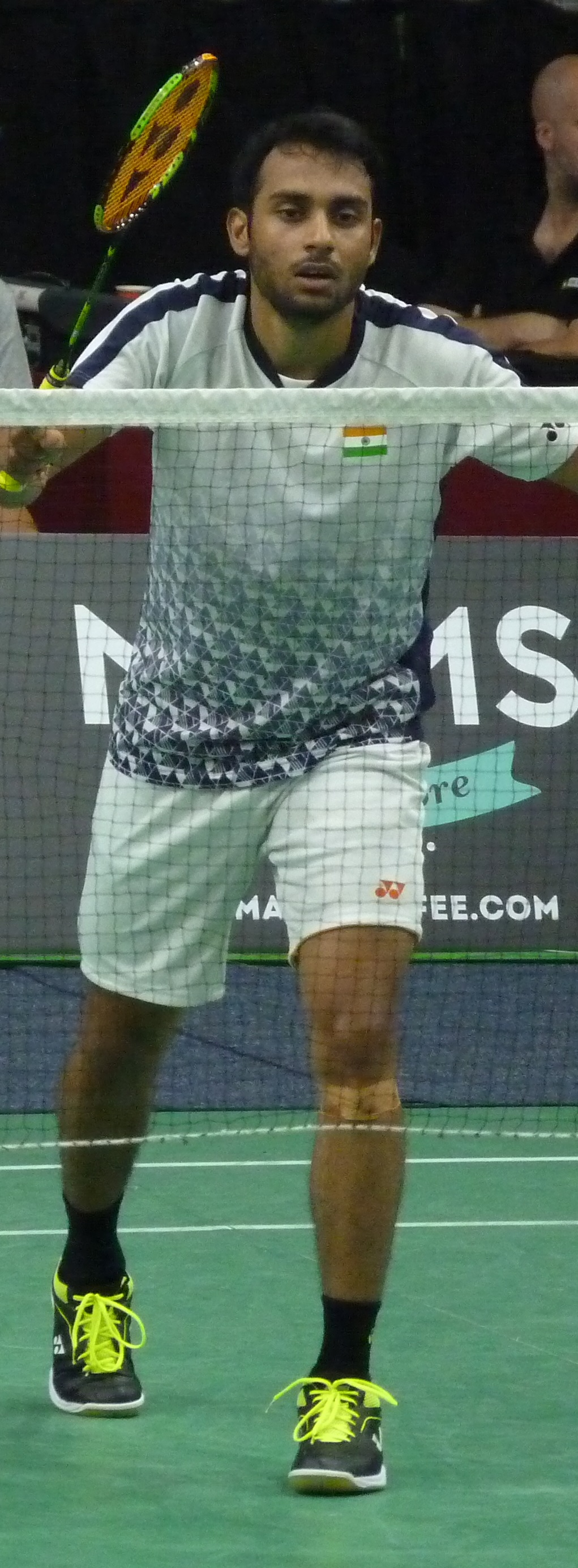

Personal information
- Born: 30 December 1992 (age 33) Dhar, Madhya Pradesh, India
- Height: 5 ft 10 in (1.78 m)

Sport
- Country: India
- Sport: Badminton
- Handedness: Right
- Coached by: Pullela Gopichand

Men's singles
- Highest ranking: 28 (17 December 2019)
- Current ranking: 65 (11 October 2022)
- BWF profile

Sourabh Verma (born 30 December 1992) is an Indian badminton player. He is a three time men's singles title Champion at the Indian National Championships. Verma reached a career high world ranking of no. 28 in December 2019.

== Career overview ==
Sourabh Verma started his career in badminton at the young age introduced by his father Sudhir Verma. In 2011, he won the Indian National Championships in the senior singles category. Verma won his first international title by winning the Bahrain International Challenge. In the same year, he was the runner-up at India Open Grand Prix Gold after losing to the former Olympic champion Taufik Hidayat.

In 2012, Sourabh Verma reached a career high of no. 30 in the world ranking, with the best results throughout the year were the quarter finalists at the Malaysia and Thailand Open Grand Prix Gold, also at the China Masters Superseries.

Sourabh Verma won back-to-back international titles in 2013 and 2014. First of them being 2013 Tata International Challenge held at Mumbai where he defeated Prannoy H. S. Verma grabbed the next title at 2014 Iran Fajr International Challenge beating Alrie Guna Dharma and the 3rd title in the row was taken by becoming the champion at the 2014 Austrian International Challenge causing an upset to his higher ranked opponent Hsu Jen-hao. Sourabh Verma also finished as the runner-up in a neck to neck match with Simon Santoso at the 2014 Malaysia Grand Prix Gold. He represented his country competed at the 2014 Asian Games.

In 2015, he finished as the runner-up at the Tata Open India International lost to his younger brother Sameer Verma in straight games. He also was the runners-up at the 2016 Belgian International, Polish International, and Bitburger Open. In October 2016, he clinched the Grand Prix title at the Chinese Taipei Masters, after his opponent Liew Daren retired in the third game due to a shoulder injury.

In 2017, he won his second title at the Indian National Championships. In the international event, his best results were the quarter finalists at the Syed Modi International and New Zealand Open. In 2018, he won the BWF Tour Super 100 level tournaments in Russian Open and Dutch Open. He participated at the 2018 Asian Games in Jakarta.

In February 2019, Sourabh Verma won his third title at the Indian National Championships.

== Achievements ==
=== BWF World Tour (4 titles, 1 runner-up) ===
The BWF World Tour, which was announced on 19 March 2017 and implemented in 2018, is a series of elite badminton tournaments sanctioned by the Badminton World Federation (BWF). The BWF World Tours are divided into levels of World Tour Finals, Super 1000, Super 750, Super 500, Super 300 (part of the HSBC World Tour), and the BWF Tour Super 100.

Men's singles
Year	Tournament	Level	Opponent	Score	Result
2018	Russian Open	Super 100	(Japan) Koki Watanabe	18–21, 21–12, 21–17	(gold) Winner
2018	Dutch Open	Super 100	(Malaysia) Cheam June Wei	21–19, 21–13	(gold) Winner
2019	Hyderabad Open	Super 100	(Singapore) Loh Kean Yew	21–13, 14–21, 21–16	(gold) Winner
2019	Vietnam Open	Super 100	(China) Sun Feixiang	21–12, 17–21, 21–14	(gold) Winner
2019	Syed Modi International	Super 300	(Chinese Taipei) Wang Tzu-wei	15–21, 17–21	(silver) Runner-up

=== BWF Grand Prix (1 title, 3 runners-up) ===
The BWF Grand Prix had two levels, the Grand Prix and Grand Prix Gold. It was a series of badminton tournaments sanctioned by the Badminton World Federation (BWF) and played between 2007 and 2017.

Men's singles
Year	Tournament	Opponent	Score	Result
2011	India Grand Prix Gold	(Indonesia) Taufik Hidayat	15–21, 18–21	(silver) Runner-up
2014	Malaysia Grand Prix Gold	(Indonesia) Simon Santoso	21–15, 16–21, 19–21	(silver) Runner-up
2016	Chinese Taipei Masters	(Malaysia) Liew Daren	12–10, 12–10, 3–3 retired	(gold) Winner
2016	Bitburger Open	(China) Shi Yuqi	19–21, 20–22	(silver) Runner-up

BWF Grand Prix Gold tournament
BWF Grand Prix tournament

=== BWF International Challenge/Series (6 titles, 3 runners-up) ===
Men's singles
Year	Tournament	Opponent	Score	Result
2011	Bahrain International	(India) Prannoy H. S.	25–23, 21–12	(gold) Winner
2013	Tata Open India International	(India) Prannoy H. S.	21–12, 21–17	(gold) Winner
2014	Iran Fajr International	(Indonesia) Alrie Guna Dharma	21–13, 21–11	(gold) Winner
2014	Austrian International	(Indonesia) Andre Kurniawan Tedjono	21–11, 21–23, 21–18	(gold) Winner
2015	Tata Open India International	(India) Sameer Verma	11–21, 18–21	(silver) Runner-up
2016	Belgian International	(France) Lucas Corvée	19–21, 19–21	(silver) Runner-up
2016	Polish International	(Denmark) Victor Svendsen	27–29, 13–21	(silver) Runner-up
2019	Slovenian International	(Japan) Minoru Koga	21–17, 21–12	(gold) Winner
2022 (III)	India International Challenge	(India) Mithun Manjunath	21–18, 17–21, 21–16	(gold) Winner

BWF International Challenge tournament
BWF International Series tournament
