= 2014 Malaysia Grand Prix Gold =

Tournament details
- Dates: 25–30 March
- Edition: 6th
- Level: Grand Prix Gold
- Total prize money: US$120,000
- Venue: Pasir Gudang Corporation Stadium
- Location: Pasir Gudang, Johor, Malaysia

Champions
- Men's singles: (Indonesia) Simon Santoso
- Women's singles: (China) Yao Xue
- Men's doubles: (Singapore) Danny Bawa Chrisnanta (Singapore) Chayut Triyachart
- Women's doubles: (China) Huang Yaqiong (China) Yu Xiaohan
- Mixed doubles: (China) Lu Kai (China) Huang Yaqiong

The 2014 Malaysia Grand Prix Gold was the fourth grand prix gold and grand prix tournament of the 2014 BWF Grand Prix Gold and Grand Prix. The tournament was held in Pasir Gudang Corporation Stadium, Pasir Gudang, Johor, Malaysia from 25–30 March 2014 and had a total purse of $120,000.

== Players by nation ==
Nation	First round	Second round	Third round	Quarterfinals	Semifinals	Final
(Malaysia)	24	8	1	4	2	1
(Chinese Taipei)	12	7		2	1	
(Indonesia)	12	9	1	2	3	2
(India)	11	5	2	4		1
(Singapore)	8	2	1	2	1	
(Thailand)	7	5		2	1	
(Japan)	5	5	1	2	2	
(China)	3	4	1	1		1
(Australia)	2					
(New Zealand)	2					
(Hong Kong)	1			1		
(Maldives)	1					
(Sweden)	1					

== Men's singles ==
=== Seeds ===
1. (Thailand) Tanongsak Saensomboonsuk (first round)
2. (Malaysia) Chong Wei Feng (semi-final)
3. (Chinese Taipei) Chou Tien-chen (quarter-final)
4. (Chinese Taipei) Hsu Jen-hao (first round)
5. (China) Xue Song (third round)
6. (India) R. M. V. Gurusaidutt (quarter-final)
7. (India) Prannoy Kumar (third round)
8. (India) Sourabh Varma (final)
9. (Japan) Kazumasa Sakai (third round)
10. (Hong Kong) Wei Nan (quarter-final)
11. (Singapore) Derek Wong (third round)
12. (India) B. Sai Praneeth (third round)
13. (Indonesia) Alamsyah Yunus (withdrew)
14. (Malaysia) Zulfadli Zulkiffli (first round)
15. (Indonesia) Simon Santoso (champion)
16. (Malaysia) Iskandar Zulkarnain Zainuddin (withdrew)

=== Finals ===
Quarterfinals
(Malaysia) Soo Teck Zhi	10	4
15	(Indonesia) Simon Santoso	21	21
(Thailand) Sitthikom Thammasin	21	17	21
10	(Hong Kong) Wei Nan	17	21	17
8	(India) Sourabh Varma	22	18	21
3	(Chinese Taipei) Chou Tien-chen	20	21	15
6	(India) R. M. V. Gurusaidutt	12	21	19
2	(Malaysia) Chong Wei Feng	21	5	21

Semifinals
15	(Indonesia) Simon Santoso	21	19	21
(Thailand) Sitthikom Thammasin	12	21	18
8	(India) Sourabh Varma
2	(Malaysia) Chong Wei Feng	wo

Final
15	(Indonesia) Simon Santoso	15	21	21
8	(India) Sourabh Varma	21	16	19

=== Top half ===
==== Section 1 ====
First Round
1	(Thailand) T Saensomboonsuk	19	18
(Malaysia) A Abdul Latif	21	21
(Singapore) R Gonansa	18	19
(Chinese Taipei) Yang C-h	21	21
14	(Malaysia) Z Zulkiffli	10^{r}
(Indonesia) Siswanto	14
(Malaysia) Soo TZ	21	21
(India) S Dey	18	9

Second Round
(Malaysia) A Abdul Latif	21	21
(Chinese Taipei) Yang C-h	12	15
(Indonesia) Siswanto	11	15
(Malaysia) Soo TZ	21	21

Third Round
(Malaysia) A Abdul Latif	12	15
(Malaysia) Soo TZ	21	21

==== Section 2 ====
First Round
5	(China) Xue S	21	21
(Malaysia) K Yogendran	12	16
(Malaysia) Chong YH	18	17
Q2	(Chinese Taipei) Yang C-c	21	21
15	(Indonesia) S Santoso	21	21
(Malaysia) Ai WJ	5	7
(India) A Prakash	21	15	21
(Indonesia) A Marteen	17	21	14

Second Round
5	(China) Xue S	16	21	21
Q2	(Chinese Taipei) Yang C-c	21	16	18
15	(Indonesia) S Santoso	21	21
(India) A Prakash	17	10

Third Round
5	(China) Xue S	12	15
15	(Indonesia) S Santoso	21	21

==== Section 3 ====
First Round
4	(Chinese Taipei) Hsu J-h	17	17
(Thailand) S Thammasin	21	21
PFQ	(India) M Behal	12	17
(Singapore) A Chen	21	21
12	(India) B S Praneeth	21	21
(Indonesia) T Mahbub	16	11
(Malaysia) N Ayub	18	21	21
Q8	(Malaysia) K Kumar	21	12	10

Second Round
(Thailand) S Thammasin	21	21
(Singapore) A Chen	6	16
12	(India) B S Praneeth	16	21	21
(Malaysia) N Ayub	21	7	4

Third Round
(Thailand) S Thammasin	21	21
12	(India) B S Praneeth	17	14

==== Section 4 ====
First Round
7	(India) P Kumar	21	21
(Malaysia) Chiang JS	10	16
(Thailand) K Phetpradab	18	16
(Japan) R Takeshita	21	21
10	(Hong Kong) Wei N	21	21
(Malaysia) Wong KY	19	16
(China) Guo K	21	21
Q6	(Indonesia) A Susanto	18	5

Second Round
7	(India) P Kumar	21	25
(Japan) R Takeshita	17	23
10	(Hong Kong) Wei N	20	21	21
(China) Guo K	22	11	18

Third Round
7	(India) P Kumar	9	21	18
10	(Hong Kong) Wei N	21	17	21

=== Bottom half ===
==== Section 5 ====
First Round
(Indonesia) A Dharma	11	16
(India) A Sridhar	21	21
(Indonesia) S Wibowo	14	15
9	(Japan) K Sakai	21	21
(India) C Anand	21	21
Q4	(Indonesia) K Akbar	11	14
(Hong Kong) Chan YK	12	17
8	(India) S Varma	21	21

Second Round
(India) A Sridhar	13	11
9	(Japan) K Sakai	21	21
(India) C Anand	14	17
8	(India) S Varma	21	21

Third Round
9	(Japan) K Sakai	15	21	19
8	(India) S Varma	21	17	21

==== Section 6 ====
First Round
(Malaysia) Goh SH	21	21
(Thailand) P Thongnuam	16	16
Q7	(Thailand) P Boontan
13	(Indonesia) A Yunus	wo
(Thailand) S Avihingsanon	21	21
(Japan) K Nishimoto	14	13
(Malaysia) Goh GC	14	23	15
3	(Chinese Taipei) Chou T-c	21	21	21

Second Round
(Malaysia) Goh SH	21	21
Q7	(Thailand) P Boontan	14	12
(Thailand) S Avihingsanon	14	19
3	(Chinese Taipei) Chou T-c	21	21

Third Round
(Malaysia) Goh SH	16	12
3	(Chinese Taipei) Chou T-c	21	21

==== Section 7 ====
First Round
(Malaysia) Kuan BH	17	15
(Indonesia) N Sulistyo	21	21
(Indonesia) W Prasetyo	21	21
PFQ	(Maldives) A Rasheed	6	11
(Singapore) Huang C	18	20
Q3	(Malaysia) Yeoh SZ	21	22
Q1	(India) G Venkat	7	8
6	(India) RMV Gurusaidutt	21	21

Second Round
(Indonesia) N Sulistyo	13	9
(Indonesia) W Prasetyo	21	21
Q3	(Malaysia) Yeoh SZ	17	13
6	(India) RMV Gurusaidutt	21	21

Third Round
(Indonesia) W Prasetyo	21	9
6	(India) RMV Gurusaidutt	23	21

==== Section 8 ====
First Round
(Malaysia) Woon KH	14	21	18
Q5	(Indonesia) K Wibowo	21	19	21
(Chinese Taipei) Lin Y-h	17	18
11	(Singapore) D Wong	21	21
(Chinese Taipei) Hsu S-w	19	18
(China) Huang YX	21	21
(Chinese Taipei) Hsueh H-y	19	10
2	(Malaysia) Chong WF	21	21

Second Round
Q5	(Indonesia) K Wibowo	14	14
11	(Singapore) D Wong	21	21
(China) Huang YX	16	18
2	(Malaysia) Chong WF	21	21

Third Round
11	(Singapore) D Wong	16	21	19
2	(Malaysia) Chong WF	21	13	21

== Women's singles ==
=== Seeds ===
1. (Chinese Taipei) Pai Hsiao-ma (second round)
2. (China) Yao Xue (champion)
3. (Japan) Yui Hashimoto (second round)
4. (Indonesia) Aprilia Yuswandari (first round)
5. (Indonesia) Hera Desi (withdrew)
6. (Japan) Kaori Imabeppu (withdrew)
7. (India) Arundhati Pantawane (first round)
8. (China) Deng Xuan (quarter-final)

=== Finals ===
Semifinals
Q1	(Japan) Nozomi Okuhara	19	14
(Indonesia) Adriyanti Firdasari	21	21
(Chinese Taipei) Hsu Ya-ching	15	22	15
2	(China) Yao Xue	21	20	21

Final
(Indonesia) Adriyanti Firdasari	18	8
2	(China) Yao Xue	21	21

=== Top half ===
==== Section 1 ====
First Round
1	(Chinese Taipei) Pai H-m	21	21
(Sweden) M Petersen	7	17
Q3	(Singapore) Liang XY	21	21	13
Q1	(Japan) N Okuhara	23	18	21
8	(China) Deng X	21	21
(Thailand) N Saengchote	10	11
(Singapore) Chen JY	14	9
(Indonesia) M Kusumastuti	21	21

Second Round
1	(Chinese Taipei) Pai H-m	19	23
Q1	(Japan) N Okuhara	21	25
8	(China) Deng X	21	21
(Indonesia) M Kusumastuti	14	10

Quarterfinals
Q1	(Japan) N Okuhara	21	21
8	(China) Deng X	11	14

==== Section 2 ====
First Round
3	(Japan) Y Hashimoto	21	21
Q4	(Malaysia) Lim YF	8	15
(Malaysia) Yang LL	16	19
(Indonesia) A Firdasari	21	21
PFQ	(Chinese Taipei) Pai Y-p	21	16	17
(India) PC Thulasi	16	21	21
(Indonesia) D Ayustine	19	17
(India) T Lad	21	21

Second Round
3	(Japan) Y Hashimoto	17	13
(Indonesia) A Firdasari	21	21
(India) PC Thulasi	21	17	21
(India) T Lad	2	21	18

Quarterfinals
(Indonesia) A Firdasari	21	17	21
(India) PC Thulasi	17	21	18

=== Bottom half ===
==== Section 3 ====
First Round
(Indonesia) A Rovita	21	15	15
(Chinese Taipei) Hsu Y-c	14	21	21
(Japan) A Mine	12	23	21
7	(India) A Pantawane	21	21	19
(Australia) T Pilven	7	8
(Japan) S Sato	21	21
(Malaysia) Tee JY	21	21
4	(Indonesia) A Yuswandari	18	14

Second Round
(Chinese Taipei) Hsu Y-c	10	21	21
(Japan) A Mine	21	13	18
(Japan) S Sato	17	18
(Malaysia) Tee JY	21	21

Quarterfinals
(Chinese Taipei) Hsu Y-c	21	21
(Malaysia) Tee JY	12	17

==== Section 4 ====
First Round
(New Zealand) A Rankin	9	10
(Thailand) P Chochuwong	21	21
Q2	(Japan) Y Fukushima	21	21
PFQ	(India) S Gokhale	13	13
(Indonesia) F Angguni	17	21	18
(Japan) K Ito	21	14	21
(Indonesia) M Wiranto	12	10
2	(China) Yao X	21	21

Second Round
(Thailand) P Chochuwong	18	21	14
Q2	(Japan) Y Fukushima	21	18	21
(Japan) K Ito	18	12
2	(China) Yao X	21	21

Quarterfinals
Q2	(Japan) Y Fukushima	19	18
2	(China) Yao X	21	21

== Men's doubles ==
=== Seeds ===
1. (Malaysia) Hoon Thien How / Tan Wee Kiong (first round)
2. (Malaysia) Goh V Shem / Lim Khim Wah (final)
3. (Indonesia) Marcus Fernaldi Gideon / Markis Kido (semi-final)
4. (Malaysia) Mohd Zakry Abdul Latif / Mohd Fairuzizuan Mohd Tazari (first round)
5. (China) Li Junhui / Liu Yuchen (first round)
6. (Indonesia) Fran Kurniawan / Bona Septano (quarter-final)
7. (Chinese Taipei) Liang Jui-wei / Liao Kuan-hao (first round)
8. (Malaysia) Ow Yao Han / Tan Boon Heong (quarter-final)

=== Finals ===
Semifinals
Q2	(Singapore) Danny Bawa Chrisnanta (Singapore) Chayut Triyachart	21	26
Q3	(Indonesia) Andrei Adistia (Indonesia) Hendra Aprida Gunawan	14	24
3	(Indonesia) Marcus Fernaldi Gideon (Indonesia) Markis Kido	21	18	17
2	(Malaysia) Goh V Shem (Malaysia) Lim Khim Wah	18	21	21

Final
Q2	(Singapore) Danny Bawa Chrisnanta (Singapore) Chayut Triyachart	21	22
2	(Malaysia) Goh V Shem (Malaysia) Lim Khim Wah	17	20

=== Top half ===
==== Section 1 ====
First Round
1	(Malaysia) Hoon TH (Malaysia) Tan WK	16	20
Q2	(Singapore) D Chrisnanta (Singapore) C Triyachart	21	22
(Singapore) T Hee (Singapore) T Yeo	14	10
(Chinese Taipei) Chen H-l (Chinese Taipei) Lu C-b	21	21
5	(China) Li JH (China) Liu YC	18	15
(Indonesia) D Indrianto (Indonesia) M Ulinnuha	21	21
PFQ	(Japan) K Kazuno (Japan) K Yamada	18	21	21
Q4	(China) Wang YL (China) Zhang W	21	17	13

Second Round
Q2	(Singapore) D Chrisnanta (Singapore) C Triyachart	20	22	21
(Chinese Taipei) Chen H-l (Chinese Taipei) Lu C-b	22	20	16
(Indonesia) D Indrianto (Indonesia) M Ulinnuha	11	11
PFQ	(Japan) K Kazuno (Japan) K Yamada	21	21

Quarterfinals
Q2	(Singapore) D Chrisnanta (Singapore) C Triyachart	19	21	22
PFQ	(Japan) K Kazuno (Japan) K Yamada	21	18	20

==== Section 2 ====
First Round
4	(Malaysia) Z Abdul Latif (Malaysia) F Tazari	18	13
Q3	(Indonesia) A Adistia (Indonesia) H Gunawan	21	21
(Chinese Taipei) Liao M-c (Chinese Taipei) Tseng M-h	21	16	21
(Japan) Y Komatsuzaki (Japan) H Takeuchi	14	21	12
6	(Indonesia) F Kurniawan (Indonesia) B Septano	21	21
(India) M Attri (India) S Reddy	11	16
(India) Sanjeeth S. (India) J Yadav	10	11
(Chinese Taipei) Lin C-y (Chinese Taipei) Wu H-l	21	21

Second Round
Q3	(Indonesia) A Adistia (Indonesia) H Gunawan	21	21
(Chinese Taipei) Liao M-c (Chinese Taipei) Tseng M-h	15	19
6	(Indonesia) F Kurniawan (Indonesia) B Septano	21	21
(Chinese Taipei) Lin C-y (Chinese Taipei) Wu H-l	16	9

Quarterfinals
Q3	(Indonesia) A Adistia (Indonesia) H Gunawan	22	19	21
6	(Indonesia) F Kurniawan (Indonesia) B Septano	20	21	18

=== Bottom half ===
==== Section 3 ====
First Round
(Indonesia) Hardianto (Indonesia) A Putra	21	21
(Chinese Taipei) Chang K-l (Chinese Taipei) Su Y-n	10	17
(Indonesia) C Rusdianto (Indonesia) T Wardhana	21	15	8
8	(Malaysia) Ow YH (Malaysia) Tan BH	19	21	21
(Malaysia) J Singh (Malaysia) R Tan	21	21
(Singapore) A Chen (Singapore) R Gonansa	16	15
(Japan) H Saeki (Japan) R Taohata	21	18	20
3	(Indonesia) M Gideon (Indonesia) M Kido	18	21	22

Second Round
(Indonesia) Hardianto (Indonesia) A Putra	26	13
8	(Malaysia) Ow YH (Malaysia) Tan BH	28	21
(Malaysia) J Singh (Malaysia) R Tan	19	12
3	(Indonesia) M Gideon (Indonesia) M Kido	21	21

Quarterfinals
8	(Malaysia) Ow YH (Malaysia) Tan BH	23	21	19
3	(Indonesia) M Gideon (Indonesia) M Kido	25	6	21

==== Section 4 ====
First Round
Q1	(Chinese Taipei) Huang C-e (Chinese Taipei) Wang C-m	15	15
(Thailand) W Ampunsuwan (Thailand) P Chalardchaleam	21	21
(India) A Francis (India) A Vishnu	22	19	21
7	(Chinese Taipei) Liang J-w (Chinese Taipei) Liao K-h	20	21	19
(India) P Chopra (India) A Dewalkar	14	15
(Malaysia) Chooi KM (Malaysia) Teo EY	21	21
(Indonesia) R Sugiarto (Indonesia) A Wirawan	17	17
2	(Malaysia) Goh VS (Malaysia) Lim KW	21	21

Second Round
(Thailand) W Ampunsuwan (Thailand) P Chalardchaleam	21	19	19
(India) A Francis (India) A Vishnu	17	21	21
(Malaysia) Chooi KM (Malaysia) Teo EY	18	21	11
2	(Malaysia) Goh VS (Malaysia) Lim KW	21	15	21

Quarterfinals
(India) A Francis (India) A Vishnu	18	14
2	(Malaysia) Goh VS (Malaysia) Lim KW	21	21

== Women's doubles ==
=== Seeds ===
1. (Indonesia) Variella Aprilsasi / Vita Marissa (second round)
2. (Malaysia) Vivian Hoo Kah Mun / Woon Khe Wei (withdrew)
3. (Singapore) Shinta Mulia Sari / Yao Lei (quarter-final)
4. (Malaysia) Amelia Alicia Anscelly / Soong Fie Cho (quarter-final)
5. (China) Huang Yaqiong / Yu Xiaohan (champion)
6. (Malaysia) Lee Meng Yean / Lim Yin Loo (semi-final)
7. (Singapore) Fu Mingtian / Vanessa Neo Yu Yan (second round)
8. (India) Prajakta Sawant / Arathi Sara Sunil (second round)

=== Finals ===
Semifinals
(Japan) Shizuka Matsuo (Japan) Mami Naito	10	23
5	(China) Huang Yaqiong (China) Yu Xiaohan	21	25
6	(Malaysia) Lee Meng Yean (Malaysia) Lim Yin Loo	17	17
PFQ	(China) Ou Dongni (China) Xiong Mengjing	21	21

Final
5	(China) Huang Yaqiong (China) Yu Xiaohan	22	12	21
PFQ	(China) Ou Dongni (China) Xiong Mengjing	20	21	18

=== Top half ===
==== Section 1 ====
First Round
1	(Indonesia) V Aprilsasi (Indonesia) V Marissa
BYE
(Singapore) Chen JY (Singapore) Liang XY	8	13
(Japan) S Matsuo (Japan) M Naito	21	21
7	(Singapore) Fu MT (Singapore) V Neo	21	21
(Thailand) P Chochuwong (Thailand) C Teachavorasinskun	18	16
(Malaysia) E Khoo (Malaysia) See TCV	21	10	10
(Thailand) P Muenwong (Thailand) K Ostermeyer	18	21	21

Second Round
1	(Indonesia) V Aprilsasi (Indonesia) V Marissa	21	14	10
(Japan) S Matsuo (Japan) M Naito	14	21	21
7	(Singapore) Fu MT (Singapore) V Neo	17	14
(Thailand) P Muenwong (Thailand) K Ostermeyer	21	21

Quarterfinals
(Japan) S Matsuo (Japan) M Naito	21	21
(Thailand) P Muenwong (Thailand) K Ostermeyer	15	14

==== Section 2 ====
First Round
4	(Malaysia) A Anscelly (Malaysia) Soong FC	21	21
PFQ	(Chinese Taipei) Chen H-y (Chinese Taipei) Huang M-c	14	10
(Thailand) C Chaladchalam (Thailand) P Munkitamorn	21	21
(India) P Gadre (India) S Reddy	18	19
5	(China) Huang YQ (China) Yu XH	21	21
(Japan) Y Fukushima (Japan) S Hirota	17	15
(Chinese Taipei) Chang Y-h (Chinese Taipei) Liu S-c	13	21	11
Q4	(Malaysia) Chin KM (Malaysia) Ti WC	21	17	21

Second Round
4	(Malaysia) A Anscelly (Malaysia) Soong FC	21	21
(Thailand) C Chaladchalam (Thailand) P Munkitamorn	17	16
5	(China) Huang YQ (China) Yu XH	21	21
Q4	(Malaysia) Chin KM (Malaysia) Ti WC	12	10

Quarterfinals
4	(Malaysia) A Anscelly (Malaysia) Soong FC	12	15
5	(China) Huang YQ (China) Yu XH	21	21

=== Bottom half ===
==== Section 3 ====
First Round
(Chinese Taipei) Chen H-h (Chinese Taipei) Lai C-w	21	21
(Malaysia) J Choong (Malaysia) Yap CW	17	15
(Thailand) N Saengchote (Thailand) S Suwannakitborihan	14	8
6	(Malaysia) Lee MY (Malaysia) Lim YL	21	21
(Malaysia) Chow MK (Malaysia) Lai SJ	16	17
(Japan) A Kugo (Japan) Y Miyauchi	21	21
(Malaysia) Lim PY (Malaysia) Lim PZ	13	8
3	(Singapore) S Sari (Singapore) Yao L	21	21

Second Round
(Chinese Taipei) Chen H-h (Chinese Taipei) Lai C-w	13	22	12
6	(Malaysia) Lee MY (Malaysia) Lim YL	21	20	21
(Japan) A Kugo (Japan) Y Miyauchi	21	20	17
3	(Singapore) S Sari (Singapore) Yao L	12	22	21

Quarterfinals
6	(Malaysia) Lee MY (Malaysia) Lim YL	21	22
3	(Singapore) S Sari (Singapore) Yao L	17	20

==== Section 4 ====
First Round
PFQ	(China) Ou DN (China) Xiong MJ	21	21
Q1	(Malaysia) Goh YC (Malaysia) Peck YW	17	13
(New Zealand) A Rankin (New Zealand) M Stapleton	14	10
8	(India) P Sawant (India) A Sunil	21	21
(Indonesia) K Dewi (Indonesia) M Jauhari	21	21
Q3	(Malaysia) N Shah (Malaysia) Yap Z	6	8
(Thailand) J Kittiharakul (Thailand) R Prajongjai	21	21
PFQ	(Chinese Taipei) Hsu Y-c (Chinese Taipei) Pai Y-p	16	14

Second Round
PFQ	(China) Ou DN (China) Xiong MJ	21	13
8	(India) P Sawant (India) A Sunil	2	5^{r}
(Indonesia) K Dewi (Indonesia) M Jauhari	9	21	8
(Thailand) J Kittiharakul (Thailand) R Prajongjai	21	10	21

Quarterfinals
PFQ	(China) Ou DN (China) Xiong MJ	21	21
(Thailand) J Kittiharakul (Thailand) R Prajongjai	14	15

== Mixed doubles ==
=== Seeds ===
1. (Singapore) Danny Bawa Chrisnanta / Vanessa Neo (semi-final)
2. (Indonesia) Edi Subaktiar / Gloria Emanuelle Widjaja (semi-final)
3. (Chinese Taipei) Liao Min-chun / Chen Hsiao-huan (second round)
4. (Indonesia) Fran Kurniawan / Shendy Puspa Irawati (second round)
5. (Malaysia) Tan Aik Quan / Lim Yin Loo (first round)
6. (India) Arun Vishnu / Aparna Balan (first round)
7. (China) Zhang Wen / Xiong Mengjing (second round)
8. (India) Pranav Chopra / Siki Reddy (quarter-final)

=== Finals ===
Semifinals
1	(Singapore) Danny Bawa Chrisnanta (Singapore) Vanessa Neo Yu Yan	18	21	9
(Indonesia) Praveen Jordan (Indonesia) Debby Susanto	21	14	21
(China) Lu Kai (China) Huang Yaqiong	19	21	21
2	(Indonesia) Edi Subaktiar (Indonesia) Gloria Emanuelle Widjaja	21	13	15

Final
(Indonesia) Praveen Jordan (Indonesia) Debby Susanto	14	13
(China) Lu Kai (China) Huang Yaqiong	21	21

=== Top half ===
==== Section 1 ====
First Round
1	(Singapore) D Chrisnanta (Singapore) V Neo	21	19	21
(Thailand) W Ampunsuwan (Thailand) J Kittiharakul	17	21	13
(Malaysia) Tan YJ (Malaysia) Peck YW	10	15
Q3	(Malaysia) Chan PS (Malaysia) Lai PJ	21	21
7	(China) Zhang W (China) Xiong MJ	21	21
Q4	(China) Wang YL (China) Ou DN	15	15
(Chinese Taipei) Su Y-n (Chinese Taipei) Huang M-c	7	12
(Indonesia) M Rijal (Indonesia) V Marissa	21	21

Second Round
1	(Singapore) D Chrisnanta (Singapore) V Neo	15	21	21
Q3	(Malaysia) Chan PS (Malaysia) Lai PJ	21	18	19
7	(China) Zhang W (China) Xiong MJ	21	15	18
(Indonesia) M Rijal (Indonesia) V Marissa	18	21	21

Quarterfinals
1	(Singapore) D Chrisnanta (Singapore) V Neo	21	21
(Indonesia) M Rijal (Indonesia) V Marissa	17	16

==== Section 2 ====
First Round
4	(Indonesia) F Kurniawan (Indonesia) S Irawati	21	21
Q1	(Indonesia) D Indrianto (Indonesia) K Dewi	16	8
(Indonesia) P Jordan (Indonesia) D Susanto	21	21
(Chinese Taipei) Lu C-b (Chinese Taipei) Cheng C-y	13	8
6	(India) A Vishnu (India) A Balan	19	7
(Malaysia) Wong FY (Malaysia) Chow MK	21	21
(Chinese Taipei) Tseng M-h (Chinese Taipei) Lai C-w	21	21
(Malaysia) Ong JG (Malaysia) Lee MY	10	19

Second Round
4	(Indonesia) F Kurniawan (Indonesia) S Irawati	19	13
(Indonesia) P Jordan (Indonesia) D Susanto	21	21
(Malaysia) Wong FY (Malaysia) Chow MK	10	22	17
(Chinese Taipei) Tseng M-h (Chinese Taipei) Lai C-w	21	20	21

Quarterfinals
(Indonesia) P Jordan (Indonesia) D Susanto	21	21
(Chinese Taipei) Tseng M-h (Chinese Taipei) Lai C-w	19	12

=== Bottom half ===
==== Section 3 ====
First Round
(Malaysia) L Abdul Khalid (Malaysia) Soong FC	21	21
(Malaysia) V Mawan (India) P Sawant	14	13
(Singapore) T Hee (Singapore) Fu MT	21	22	21
5	(Malaysia) Tan AQ (Malaysia) Lim YL	18	24	19
(Japan) K Kazuno (Japan) Y Miyauchi	15	14
(China) Lu K (China) Huang YQ	21	21
(Malaysia) Chua KW (Malaysia) Cheah YS	15	19
3	(Chinese Taipei) Liao M-c (Chinese Taipei) Chen H-h	21	21

Second Round
(Malaysia) L Abdul Khalid (Malaysia) Soong FC	16	21	13
(Singapore) T Hee (Singapore) Fu MT	21	17	21
(China) Lu K (China) Huang YQ	21	21
3	(Chinese Taipei) Liao M-c (Chinese Taipei) Chen H-h	15	9

Quarterfinals
(Singapore) T Hee (Singapore) Fu MT	13	21	20
(China) Lu K (China) Huang YQ	21	19	22

==== Section 4 ====
First Round
(Malaysia) Yeoh KE (Australia) M Sun	9	14
Q2	(Chinese Taipei) Yang P-h (Chinese Taipei) Chen H-y	21	21
(Malaysia) Tan CT (Malaysia) Lai SJ	16	14
8	(India) P Chopra (India) S Reddy	21	21
(China) Liu YC (China) Yu XH	23	11	21
(Singapore) C Triyachart (Singapore) Yao L	21	21	16
(Singapore) T Yeo (Singapore) S Sari	18	18
2	(Indonesia) E Subaktiar (Indonesia) G Widjaja	21	21

Second Round
Q2	(Chinese Taipei) Yang P-h (Chinese Taipei) Chen H-y	13	21	14
8	(India) P Chopra (India) S Reddy	21	17	21
(China) Liu YC (China) Yu XH	21	20	19
2	(Indonesia) E Subaktiar (Indonesia) G Widjaja	19	22	21

Quarterfinals
8	(India) P Chopra (India) S Reddy	26	19
2	(Indonesia) E Subaktiar (Indonesia) G Widjaja	28	21

Preceded by 2014 Swiss Open Grand Prix Gold	BWF Grand Prix Gold and Grand Prix; 2014 season	Succeeded by 2014 New Zealand Open Grand Prix
