= Xiong Mengjing =

Chinese badminton player (born 1994)

Xiong Mengjing 熊梦静
Personal information
- Born: 26 February 1994 (age 32) Jiangsu, China
- Height: 1.75 m (5 ft 9 in)

Sport
- Country: China
- Sport: Badminton

Women's & mixed doubles
- Highest ranking: 51 (WD 11 December 2014); 150 (XD 8 May 2014)
- BWF profile
Medal record
Women's badminton
Representing China
Asian Junior Championships
| Silver medal – second place | 2012 Gimcheon | Mixed team |

Xiong Mengjing (Chinese: 熊梦静, born 26 February 1994) is a Chinese badminton player.

== Achievements ==
=== BWF Grand Prix ===
The BWF Grand Prix had two levels, the BWF Grand Prix and Grand Prix Gold. It was a series of badminton tournaments sanctioned by the Badminton World Federation (BWF) which was held from 2007 to 2017.

Women's doubles
| Year | Tournament | Partner | Opponent | Score | Result |
|---|---|---|---|---|---|
| 2014 | Malaysia Grand Prix Gold | (China) Ou Dongni | (China) Huang Yaqiong (China) Yu Xiaohan | 20–22, 21–12, 18–21 | (silver) Runner-up |

BWF Grand Prix Gold tournament
BWF Grand Prix tournament

=== BWF International Challenge/Series ===
Women's doubles
| Year | Tournament | Partner | Opponent | Score | Result |
|---|---|---|---|---|---|
| 2014 | China International | (China) Ou Dongni | (China) Luo Ying (China) Luo Yu | 13–21, 12–21 | (silver) Runner-up |

BWF International Challenge tournament
BWF International Series tournament
BWF Future Series tournament
