= Misaki Matsutomo =

Japanese badminton player

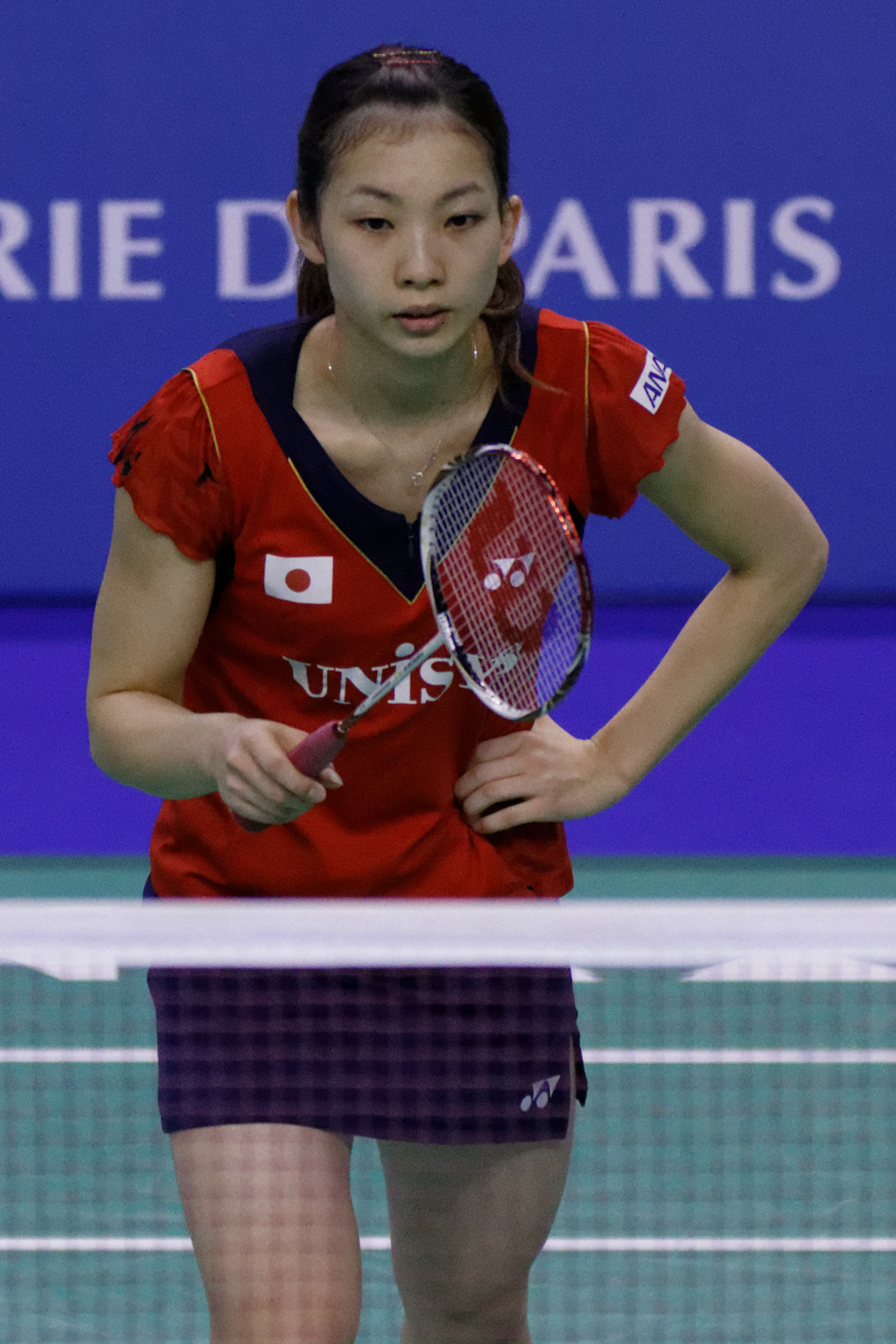
- Matsutomo at the 2013 French Super Series

Personal information
- Born: 8 February 1992 (age 34) Aizumi, Tokushima, Japan
- Height: 1.59 m (5 ft 3 in)

Sport
- Country: Japan
- Sport: Badminton
- Handedness: Right

Women's & mixed doubles
- Highest ranking: 1 (WD with Ayaka Takahashi, 20 October 2014); 12 (XD with Kenichi Hayakawa, 19 June 2014); 12 (XD with Yuki Kaneko, 27 December 2022)
- BWF profile
Medal record
Women's badminton
Representing Japan
Olympic Games
Gold medal – first place	2016 Rio de Janeiro	Women's doubles
World Championships
Bronze medal – third place	2017 Glasgow	Women's doubles
Sudirman Cup
Silver medal – second place	2015 Donggguan	Mixed team
Silver medal – second place	2019 Nanning	Mixed team
Silver medal – second place	2021 Vantaa	Mixed team
Bronze medal – third place	2017 Gold Coast	Mixed team
Uber Cup
Gold medal – first place	2018 Bangkok	Women's team
Silver medal – second place	2014 New Delhi	Women's team
Silver medal – second place	2020 Aarhus	Women's team
Bronze medal – third place	2012 Wuhan	Women's team
Bronze medal – third place	2016 Kunshan	Women's team
Bronze medal – third place	2022 Bangkok	Women's team
Asian Games
Gold medal – first place	2018 Jakarta–Palembang	Women's team
Silver medal – second place	2014 Incheon	Women's doubles
Silver medal – second place	2018 Jakarta–Palembang	Women's doubles
Bronze medal – third place	2014 Incheon	Women's team
Asian Championships
Gold medal – first place	2016 Wuhan	Women's doubles
Gold medal – first place	2017 Wuhan	Women's doubles
Silver medal – second place	2018 Wuhan	Women's doubles
Bronze medal – third place	2015 Wuhan	Women's doubles
Bronze medal – third place	2015 Wuhan	Mixed doubles
Asia Mixed Team Championships
Gold medal – first place	2017 Ho Chi Minh	Mixed team
Asia Team Championships
Gold medal – first place	2018 Alor Setar	Women's team
Silver medal – second place	2016 Hyderabad	Women's team
World Junior Championships
Silver medal – second place	2010 Guadalajara	Girls' singles
Asian Junior Championships
Bronze medal – third place	2007 Kuala Lumpur	Mixed team

Misaki Matsutomo (松友 美佐紀, Matsutomo Misaki; born 8 February 1992) is a Japanese badminton player who is a doubles specialist. Alongside her long-time partner Ayaka Takahashi, she secured Japan's first-ever gold medal in badminton at the 2016 Summer Olympics. The victory credited with effectively breaking the prolonged Chinese dominance in the women's doubles discipline. Matsutomo and Takahashi excellence was formally recognized by the Badminton World Federation when they were named the 2017 Female Player of the Year. Reaching the World No. 1 ranking, Matsutomo became renowned for her technical mastery of the front court, utilizing sophisticated net play, rapid interceptions, and precise shuttle placement to dictate the tempo of international matches.

Matsutomo individual honors include several titles, most notably two BWF year-end finals titles in 2014 and 2018. Within the continental championships, Matsutomo is a two-time Asian Champion, having secured gold medals in 2016 and 2017. Her competitive consistency is further evidenced by two silver medals at the 2014 and 2018 Asian Games, as well a bronze at the 2017 BWF World Championships. At the international team level, Matsutomo has been a cornerstone of the Japanese national squad since her debut. Her contributions were instrumental during Japan's period of global supremacy, highlighted by the team's triumph at the 2018 Uber Cup and a gold medal at the 2018 Asian Games team event.

== Career ==
=== 2007–2011 ===
Matsutomo began her long-standing women's doubles partnership with Ayaka Takahashi while they were high school classmates. In 2007, she won a bronze medal in the mixed team event at the Asian Junior Championships. The following year, she finished as runner-up in girls' singles at the 2008 North Shore City International and in mixed doubles at the 2008 Waikato International. In 2009, Matsutomo and Takahashi won women's doubles titles at the Belgian International, the Osaka International, and the India Open Grand Prix. At the 2010 World Junior Championships in Guadalajara, Mexico, Matsutomo secured the silver medal in girls' singles, finishing as runner-up to Ratchanok Intanon.

=== 2012–2015 ===
In 2012, Matsutomo and Takahashi expanded their international presence, winning Grand Prix titles at the U.S. Open, Canada Open, and Indonesia Masters, while reaching their first BWF Superseries final at the Denmark Open. She also contributed to Japan's bronze medal finish at the 2012 Uber Cup. In 2014, the pair won their first BWF Superseries title at the Japan Open and captured the German Open. At the 2014 Asian Games in Incheon, they earned a silver medal in women's doubles and a bronze medal in the women's team event. On 20 October 2014, Matsutomo and Takahashi achieved the BWF World No. 1 ranking in women's doubles. They capped the season by winning the 2014 BWF Super Series Finals in Dubai, defeating Tian Qing and Zhao Yunlei in the final. In 2015, they won the India Open, claimed bronze medals in both women's doubles and mixed doubles (with Kenichi Hayakawa) at the Asian Championships, and earned a silver medal with Japan at the Sudirman Cup.

=== 2016–2018 ===
In 2016, Matsutomo and Takahashi established global dominance by winning five major titles, including the All England Open, India Open, Indonesia Open, Denmark Open, and the Asian Championships. At the 2016 Summer Olympics in Rio de Janeiro, they won Japan's first-ever Olympic gold medal in badminton by defeating Denmark's Christinna Pedersen and Kamilla Rytter Juhl 18–21, 21–9, 21–19 in the women's doubles final. This victory marked the first time a non-Chinese pair had won the Olympic women's doubles gold medal since 1996. Following their Olympic achievement, Matsutomo and Takahashi were named the 2016 BWF Female Player of the Year. In 2017, the duo retained their Asian Championships gold medal, won the Australian Open and Japan Open titles, and earned a bronze medal at the World Championships in Glasgow. Matsutomo also earned team bronze at the 2017 Sudirman Cup and gold at the 2017 Asia Mixed Team Championships. In 2018, Matsutomo played a central role in team competitions, helping Japan win the Asia Team Championships, the Uber Cup, Japan's first title in the tournament in 37 years, and the women's team gold medal at the Asian Games in Jakarta. In individual events that year, she earned a silver medal in women's doubles at the Asian Games and captured her second year-end title at the BWF World Tour Finals, along with World Tour titles at the Malaysia Open, China Open, Korea Open, and Indonesia Masters.

=== 2019–present ===
Throughout her career, Matsutomo has also competed extensively in mixed doubles. She previously reached a career-high mixed doubles ranking of World No. 12 with Kenichi Hayakawa in 2014. Partnering with Yuki Kaneko, she reached a career-high ranking of World No. 12 in December 2022. The pair finished as runners-up at the 2021 All England Open and the 2023 Syed Modi International. In 2025, Matsutomo temporarily returned to women's doubles in a partnership with Chiharu Shida.

In May 2025, Matsutomo formed a temporary mixed doubles partnership with Yuta Watanabe. The pair finished as runners-up at the Japan Ranking Circuit, losing to Hiroki Nishi and Akari Sato in the final. At the 2025 Singapore Open, Matsutomo and Watanabe defeated France's Thom Gicquel and Delphine Delrue in the first round, before losing to compatriots Yuichi Shimogami and Sayaka Hobara in the second round. They reunited at the Hong Kong Open in September and reached the semifinals, where they lost to Feng Yanzhe and Huang Dongping.

In November 2025, Matsutomo reached another mixed doubles semifinal at the Japan Masters, this time partnering with Akira Koga. The pair lost to eventual champions Dechapol Puavaranukroh and Supissara Paewsampran.

In July 2026, Matsutomo briefly partnered with Hiroki Midorikawa in mixed doubles. At the Japan Open, the pair lost in the first round to second seeds Jiang Zhenbang and Wei Yaxin. Matsutomo and Midorikawa also competed at the China Open the following week, losing in the first round.

== Honours and awards ==
- Medal with Purple Ribbon awarded by the Emperor of Japan: Individual Sports with Ayaka Takahashi (2016).
- BWF Awards: Female Player of the Year with Ayaka Takahashi (2016).
- Japanese Olympic Committee (JOC) Sports Award: Excellence Award with Ayaka Takahashi (2016).

== Sponsorships and endorsements ==
In December 2016, Matsutomo signed an endorsement agreement with racket manufacturer Wilson, which was described at the time as covering the remainder of her playing career.

In June 2017, Matsutomo announced individual agreements with three Japanese sports equipment companies: Descente, Nippon Sigmax and Mizuno. Her advisory agreement with Descente covered training apparel and SKINS recovery products, while Nippon Sigmax's sponsorship agreement provided ZAMST sports supports and Custom Balance insoles. Mizuno signed her as a footwear brand ambassador, supplying badminton and training shoes. Her Mizuno agreement, effective 1 July 2017, also included participation in footwear development and promotional activities.

Matsutomo expanded her partnership with Mizuno in May 2022 by signing an apparel agreement. In January 2026, Mizuno announced a racket partnership with Matsutomo, effective from 1 January that year.

Matsutomo has also been featured as an adviser for the mattress brand Magniflex on its Japanese website. On 15 May 2026, Japanese regional bank Hyakujushi Bank announced that it had entered into a sponsorship agreement with her as part of its support for sporting activities.

== Achievements ==
=== Olympic Games ===
Women's doubles
Year	Venue	Partner	Opponent	Score	Result	Ref.
2016	Riocentro – Pavilion 4, Rio de Janeiro, Brazil	(Japan) Ayaka Takahashi	(Denmark) Christinna Pedersen (Denmark) Kamilla Rytter Juhl	18–21, 21–9, 21–19	Gold	

=== World Championships ===
Women's doubles
Year	Venue	Partner	Opponent	Score	Result	Ref.
2017	Emirates Arena, Glasgow, Scotland	(Japan) Ayaka Takahashi	(China) Chen Qingchen (China) Jia Yifan	17–21, 15–21	Bronze	

=== Asian Games ===
Women's doubles
Year	Venue	Partner	Opponent	Score	Result	Ref.
2014	Gyeyang Gymnasium, Incheon, South Korea	(Japan) Ayaka Takahashi	(Indonesia) Nitya Krishinda Maheswari (Indonesia) Greysia Polii	15–21, 9–21	Silver	
2018	Istora Gelora Bung Karno, Jakarta, Indonesia	(Japan) Ayaka Takahashi	(China) Chen Qingchen (China) Jia Yifan	20–22, 20–22	Silver	

=== Asian Championships ===
Women's doubles
Year	Venue	Partner	Opponent	Score	Result	Ref.
2015	Wuhan Sports Center Gymnasium, Wuhan, China	(Japan) Ayaka Takahashi	(China) Wang Xiaoli (China) Yu Yang	18–21, 21–18, 15–21	Bronze	
2016	Wuhan Sports Center Gymnasium, Wuhan, China	(Japan) Ayaka Takahashi	(Japan) Naoko Fukuman (Japan) Kurumi Yonao	21–13, 21–15	Gold	
2017	Wuhan Sports Center Gymnasium, Wuhan, China	(Japan) Ayaka Takahashi	(South Korea) Kim Hye-rin (South Korea) Yoo Hae-won	21–19, 16–21, 21–10	Gold	
2018	Wuhan Sports Center Gymnasium, Wuhan, China	(Japan) Ayaka Takahashi	(Japan) Yuki Fukushima (Japan) Sayaka Hirota	18–21, 21–18, 15–21	Silver	

Mixed doubles
Year	Venue	Partner	Opponent	Score	Result	Ref.
2015	Wuhan Sports Center Gymnasium, Wuhan, China	(Japan) Kenichi Hayakawa	(Hong Kong) Lee Chun Hei (Hong Kong) Chau Hoi Wah	17–21, 19–21	Bronze	

=== World Junior Championships ===
Girls' singles
Year	Venue	Opponent	Score	Result	Ref.
2010	Domo del Code Jalisco, Guadalajara, Mexico	(Thailand) Ratchanok Intanon	13–21, 21–16, 10–21	Silver	

=== BWF World Tour (6 titles, 8 runners-up) ===
The BWF World Tour, which was announced on 19 March 2017 and implemented in 2018, is a series of elite badminton tournaments sanctioned by the Badminton World Federation (BWF). The BWF World Tour is divided into levels of World Tour Finals, Super 1000, Super 750, Super 500, Super 300 (part of the HSBC World Tour), and the BWF Tour Super 100.

Women's doubles
Year	Tournament	Level	Partner	Opponent	Score	Result	Ref.
2018	Indonesia Masters	Super 500	(Japan) Ayaka Takahashi	(Indonesia) Greysia Polii (Indonesia) Apriyani Rahayu	21–17, 21–12	(gold) Winner	
2018	Malaysia Open	Super 750	(Japan) Ayaka Takahashi	(China) Chen Qingchen (China) Jia Yifan	21–12, 21–12	(gold) Winner	
2018	Thailand Open	Super 500	(Japan) Ayaka Takahashi	(Indonesia) Greysia Polii (Indonesia) Apriyani Rahayu	13–21, 10–21	(silver) Runner-up	
2018	China Open	Super 1000	(Japan) Ayaka Takahashi	(Japan) Mayu Matsumoto (Japan) Wakana Nagahara	21–16, 21–12	(gold) Winner	
2018	Korea Open	Super 500	(Japan) Ayaka Takahashi	(Japan) Yuki Fukushima (Japan) Sayaka Hirota	21–11, 21–18	(gold) Winner	
2018	BWF World Tour Finals	World Tour Finals	(Japan) Ayaka Takahashi	(South Korea) Lee So-hee (South Korea) Shin Seung-chan	21–12, 22–20	(gold) Winner	
2019	Indonesia Masters	Super 500	(Japan) Ayaka Takahashi	(South Korea) Kim So-yeong (South Korea) Kong Hee-yong	21–19, 21–15	(gold) Winner	
2019	German Open	Super 300	(Japan) Ayaka Takahashi	(China) Du Yue (China) Li Yinhui	20–22, 15–21	(silver) Runner-up	
2019	New Zealand Open	Super 300	(Japan) Ayaka Takahashi	(South Korea) Kim So-yeong (South Korea) Kong Hee-yong	15–21, 18–21	(silver) Runner-up	
2019	Indonesia Open	Super 1000	(Japan) Ayaka Takahashi	(Japan) Yuki Fukushima (Japan) Sayaka Hirota	16–21, 18–21	(silver) Runner-up	
2019	China Open	Super 1000	(Japan) Ayaka Takahashi	(China) Chen Qingchen (China) Jia Yifan	14–21, 18–21	(silver) Runner-up	
2019	Korea Masters	Super 300	(Japan) Ayaka Takahashi	(Japan) Nami Matsuyama (Japan) Chiharu Shida	21–15, 17–21, 18–21	(silver) Runner-up	

Mixed doubles
Year	Tournament	Level	Partner	Opponent	Score	Result	Ref.
2021	All England Open	Super 1000	(Japan) Yuki Kaneko	(Japan) Yuta Watanabe (Japan) Arisa Higashino	14–21, 13–21	(silver) Runner-up	
2023	Syed Modi International	Super 300	(Japan) Yuki Kaneko	(Indonesia) Dejan Ferdinansyah (Indonesia) Gloria Emanuelle Widjaja	22–20, 19–21, 23–25	(silver) Runner-up	

=== BWF Superseries (9 titles, 13 runners-up) ===
The BWF Superseries, which was launched on 14 December 2006 and implemented in 2007, was a series of elite badminton tournaments, sanctioned by the Badminton World Federation (BWF). BWF Superseries levels were Superseries and Superseries Premier. A season of Superseries consisted of twelve tournaments around the world that had been introduced since 2011. Successful players were invited to the Superseries Finals, which were held at the end of each year.

Women's doubles
Year	Tournament	Partner	Opponent	Score	Result	Ref.
2012	Denmark Open	(Japan) Ayaka Takahashi	(China) Ma Jin (China) Tang Jinhua	8–21, 12–21	(silver) Runner-up	
2013	Malaysia Open	(Japan) Ayaka Takahashi	(China) Bao Yixin (China) Tian Qing	16–21, 14–21	(silver) Runner-up	
2013	Singapore Open	(Japan) Ayaka Takahashi	(China) Tian Qing (China) Zhao Yunlei	19–21, 16–21	(silver) Runner-up	
2014	Malaysia Open	(Japan) Ayaka Takahashi	(China) Bao Yixin (China) Tang Jinhua	19–21, 21–14, 13–21	(silver) Runner-up	
2014	Japan Open	(Japan) Ayaka Takahashi	(Japan) Reika Kakiiwa (Japan) Miyuki Maeda	21–13, 21–17	(gold) Winner	
2014	Australian Open	(Japan) Ayaka Takahashi	(China) Tian Qing (China) Zhao Yunlei	15–21, 9–21	(silver) Runner-up	
2014	Denmark Open	(Japan) Ayaka Takahashi	(China) Wang Xiaoli (China) Yu Yang	14–21, 14–21	(silver) Runner-up	
2014	Hong Kong Open	(Japan) Ayaka Takahashi	(China) Tian Qing (China) Zhao Yunlei	13–21, 13–21	(silver) Runner-up	
2014	Dubai World Superseries Finals	(Japan) Ayaka Takahashi	(China) Tian Qing (China) Zhao Yunlei	21–17, 21–14	(gold) Winner	
2015	India Open	(Japan) Ayaka Takahashi	(China) Luo Ying (China) Luo Yu	21–19, 21–19	(gold) Winner	
2015	Singapore Open	(Japan) Ayaka Takahashi	(China) Ou Dongni (China) Yu Xiaohan	17–21, 16–21	(silver) Runner-up	
2015	China Open	(Japan) Ayaka Takahashi	(China) Tang Yuanting (China) Yu Yang	21–18, 13–21, 12–21	(silver) Runner-up	
2016	All England Open	(Japan) Ayaka Takahashi	(China) Tang Yuanting (China) Yu Yang	21–10, 21–12	(gold) Winner	
2016	India Open	(Japan) Ayaka Takahashi	(Japan) Naoko Fukuman (Japan) Kurumi Yonao	21–18, 21–18	(gold) Winner	
2016	Singapore Open	(Japan) Ayaka Takahashi	(Indonesia) Nitya Krishinda Maheswari (Indonesia) Greysia Polii	Walkover	(silver) Runner-up	
2016	Indonesia Open	(Japan) Ayaka Takahashi	(China) Tang Yuanting (China) Yu Yang	21–15, 8–21, 21–15	(gold) Winner	
2016	Japan Open	(Japan) Ayaka Takahashi	(Denmark) Christinna Pedersen (Denmark) Kamilla Rytter Juhl	21–19, 18–21, 12–21	(silver) Runner-up	
2016	Denmark Open	(Japan) Ayaka Takahashi	(South Korea) Jung Kyung-eun (South Korea) Shin Seung-chan	19–21, 21–11, 21–16	(gold) Winner	
2016	Dubai World Superseries Finals	(Japan) Ayaka Takahashi	(China) Chen Qingchen (China) Jia Yifan	15–21, 21–13, 17–21	(silver) Runner-up	
2017	Singapore Open	(Japan) Ayaka Takahashi	(Denmark) Christinna Pedersen (Denmark) Kamilla Rytter Juhl	18–21, 21–14, 15–21	(silver) Runner-up	
2017	Australian Open	(Japan) Ayaka Takahashi	(Denmark) Christinna Pedersen (Denmark) Kamilla Rytter Juhl	21–10, 21–13	(gold) Winner	
2017	Japan Open	(Japan) Ayaka Takahashi	(South Korea) Kim Ha-na (South Korea) Kong Hee-yong	21–18, 21–16	(gold) Winner	

BWF Super Series Finals tournament
BWF Super Series Premier tournament
BWF Super Series tournament

=== BWF Grand Prix (6 titles, 2 runners-up) ===
The BWF Grand Prix had two levels, the Grand Prix and Grand Prix Gold. It was a series of badminton tournaments sanctioned by the Badminton World Federation (BWF) and played between 2007 and 2017.

Women's doubles
Year	Tournament	Partner	Opponent	Score	Result	Ref.
2009	India Grand Prix	(Japan) Ayaka Takahashi	(Indonesia) Nadya Melati (Indonesia) Devi Tika Permatasari	21–14, 15–21, 21–15	(gold) Winner	
2011	Russian Open	(Japan) Ayaka Takahashi	(Russia) Valeri Sorokina (Russia) Nina Vislova	20–22, 18–21	(silver) Runner-up	
2012	U.S. Open	(Japan) Ayaka Takahashi	(Russia) Valeri Sorokina (Russia) Nina Vislova	21–19, 21–17	(gold) Winner	
2012	Canada Open	(Japan) Ayaka Takahashi	(Japan) Yuriko Miki (Japan) Koharu Yonemoto	21–15, 15–21, 21–12	(gold) Winner	
2012	Indonesia Grand Prix Gold	(Japan) Ayaka Takahashi	(South Korea) Eom Hye-won (South Korea) Jang Ye-na	21–12, 12–21, 21–13	(gold) Winner	
2014	German Open	(Japan) Ayaka Takahashi	(South Korea) Jung Kyung-eun (South Korea) Kim Ha-na	23–21, 24–22	(gold) Winner	
2016	Malaysia Masters	(Japan) Ayaka Takahashi	(China) Tang Yuanting (China) Yu Yang	21–18, 22–20	(gold) Winner	

Mixed doubles
Year	Tournament	Partner	Opponent	Score	Result	Ref.
2012	U.S. Open	(Japan) Kenichi Hayakawa	(United States) Tony Gunawan (Indonesia) Vita Marissa	13–21, 10–21	(silver) Runner-up	

BWF Grand Prix Gold tournament
BWF Grand Prix tournament

=== BWF International Challenge/Series (2 titles, 4 runners-up) ===
Women's singles
Year	Tournament	Opponent	Score	Result	Ref.
2008	North Shore City International	(Japan) Sayaka Sato	18–21, 20–22	(silver) Runner-up	
2009	Belgian International	(Netherlands) Yao Jie	14–21, 21–14, 16–21	(silver) Runner-up	

Women's doubles
Year	Tournament	Partner	Opponent	Score	Result	Ref.
2009	Belgian International	(Japan) Ayaka Takahashi	(Scotland) Emma Mason (England) Samantha Ward	21–8, 18–21, 21–13	(gold) Winner	
2009	Osaka International	(Japan) Ayaka Takahashi	(Japan) Kaori Mori (Japan) Aya Wakisaka	21–16, 16–21, 24–22	(gold) Winner	
2010	Osaka International	(Japan) Ayaka Takahashi	(Japan) Mizuki Fujii (Japan) Reika Kakiiwa	19–21, 16–21	(silver) Runner-up	

Mixed doubles
Year	Tournament	Partner	Opponent	Score	Result	Ref.
2008	Waikato International	(Japan) Naomasa Senkyo	(New Zealand) Henry Tam (New Zealand) Donna Haliday	13–21, 18–21	(silver) Runner-up	

BWF International Challenge tournament
BWF International Series tournament

== Performance timeline ==
Key

W	Won	F	Finalist	SF	Semi-finalist
QF	Quarter-finalist	#R	Rounds 4, 3, 2, 1	RR	Round-robin stage
Q#	Qualification round	A	Absent	w/d	Withdrew
G	Gold	S	Silver	B	Bronze
NH	Not held	N/A	Not applicable	DNQ	Did not qualify

=== National team ===
- Junior level

Team event	2007
Asian Junior Championships	B

- Senior level

Team events	2012	2013	2014	2015	2016	2017	2018	2019	2020	2021	2022
Asia Team Championships	NH				S	NH	G	NH	A	NH	A
Asia Mixed Team Championships	NH					G	NH	A	NH		
Asian Games	NH		B	NH			G	NH			
Uber Cup	B	NH	S	NH	B	NH	G	NH	S	NH	B
Sudirman Cup	NH	QF	NH	S	NH	B	NH	S	NH	S	NH

=== Individual competitions ===
==== Junior level ====
- Girls' singles

Event	2010
World Junior Championships	S

- Mixed doubles

Event	2010
World Junior Championships	2R

==== Senior level ====
===== Women's singles =====
Tournament	BWF Superseries / Grand Prix		Best
Tournament	2009	2010	Best
Malaysia Masters	A	QF	QF ('10)
Australian Open	A	2R	2R ('10)
Japan Open	1R	A	1R ('09)
Syed Modi International	2R	A	2R ('09)
China Masters	1R	A	1R ('09)
Year-end ranking	134	142	58
Tournament	2009	2010	Best

===== Women's doubles =====
Event	2011	2012	2013	2014	2015	2016	2017	2018	2019
Asian Championships	1R	A	1R	A	B	G	G	S	1R
Asian Games	NH			S	NH			S	NH
World Championships	3R	NH	2R	3R	3R	NH	B	3R	QF
Olympic Games	NH	DNQ	NH			G	NH		

Tournament	BWF Superseries / Grand Prix										BWF World Tour								Best
Tournament	2008	2009	2010	2011	2012	2013	2014	2015	2016	2017	2018	2019	2020	2021	2022	2023	2024	2025	Best
Malaysia Open	A		1R	2R	A	F	F	1R	QF	SF	W	2R	NH		A			QF	W ('18)
India Open	A			2R	QF	SF	QF	W	W	A			NH		A			2R	W ('15, '16)
Indonesia Masters	NH		A		W	A				NH	W	W	SF	A					W ('12, '18, '19)
German Open	A			2R	QF	SF	W	2R	SF	A	w/d	F	NH		A				W ('14)
All England Open	A		1R	2R	2R	1R	SF	1R	W	2R	QF	1R	SF	A					W ('16)
Swiss Open	A		1R	2R	2R	A							NH	A					2R ('11, '12)
Chinese Taipei Open	A	1R	A					SF	A				NH		A				SF ('15)
Thailand Open	A		NH	A			NH	A			F	QF	A	NH	A				F ('18)
Malaysia Masters	NH	A	2R	1R	A				W	A	QF	SF	QF	NH	A				W ('16)
Singapore Open	A		1R	2R	2R	F	SF	F	F	F	A	2R	NH		A				F ('13, '15, '16, '17)
Indonesia Open	A		1R	1R	A	QF	2R	2R	W	1R	SF	F	NH	A					W ('16)
U.S. Open	A			1R	W	A							NH			A			W ('12)
Canada Open	NH		A		W	A							NH		A				W ('12)
Japan Open	2R	2R	2R	1R	2R	SF	W	2R	F	W	2R	SF	NH		A				W ('14, '17)
China Open	A		QF	QF	QF	QF	SF	F	2R	QF	W	F	NH			A			W ('18)
Hong Kong Open	A			2R	QF	SF	F	QF	QF	1R	QF	QF	NH			A			F ('14)
China Masters	A	1R	A	1R	A	QF	A				SF	2R	NH			A			SF ('18)
Korea Open	A		QF	2R	A	QF	QF	w/d	A	SF	W	QF	NH		A				W ('18)
Denmark Open	A		2R	QF	F	SF	F	2R	W	2R	2R	1R	A						W ('16)
French Open	A			1R	QF	QF	QF	2R	SF	QF	QF	2R	NH	A					SF ('16)
Korea Masters	N/A		A									F	NH		A				F ('19)
Australian Open	N/A	A	QF	QF	QF	A	F	SF	QF	W	A	SF	NH		A				W ('17)
Syed Modi International	NH	W	A			NH	A				1R	A	NH		A				W ('09)
Superseries / World Tour Finals	DNQ				RR	RR	W	SF	F	DNQ	W	DNQ							W ('14, '18)
Dutch Open	A		1R	A									NH	NA					1R ('10)
New Zealand Open	A		NH	N/A	NH	A						F	NH						F ('19)
Russian Open	A			F	A								NH						F ('11)
Year-end ranking		41	21	17	7	4	2	4	1	2	2	4	7	807	671	—	—	127	1
Tournament	2008	2009	2010	2011	2012	2013	2014	2015	2016	2017	2018	2019	2020	2021	2022	2023	2024	2025	Best

===== Mixed doubles =====
Event	2011	2012	2013	2014	2015	2016	2017	2018	2019	2020	2021	2022	2023	2024
Asian Championships	1R	A	1R	A	B	A			QF	NH		QF	1R	2R
Asian Games	NH			2R	NH			A	NH			A	NH	
World Championships	A	NH	QF	2R	2R	NH	A	2R	2R	NH	QF	2R	1R	NH

Tournament	BWF Superseries / Grand Prix								BWF World Tour									Best
Tournament	2010	2011	2012	2013	2014	2015	2016	2017	2018	2019	2020	2021	2022	2023	2024	2025	2026	Best
Malaysia Open	A	2R	A	1R	1R	1R	A		2R	1R	NH		1R	2R	1R	A		2R ('11, '18, '23)
India Open	A	1R	A	2R	1R	QF	A				NH		A	2R	2R	A		QF ('15)
Indonesia Masters	A							NH	A	1R	A	1R	A	SF	1R	A		SF ('23)
German Open	A	2R	A	QF	2R	1R	A			2R	NH		2R	2R	A			QF ('13)
All England Open	1R	A		1R	QF	2R	A			1R	A	F	QF	QF	1R	A		F ('21)
Swiss Open	1R	1R	QF	A							NH	A			2R	A		QF ('12)
Thailand Open	NH	A			NH	A			2R	QF	A	NH	2R	QF	A			QF ('19, '23)
Malaysia Masters	A	1R	A							2R	A	NH	2R	2R	A			2R ('19, '22, '23)
Singapore Open	A	1R	2R	2R	2R	A		2R	A	QF	NH		A	1R	2R	2R	A	QF ('19)
Indonesia Open	A	2R	A	1R	1R	2R	A		2R	1R	NH	1R	1R	1R	2R	A		2R ('11, '15, '18, '24)
Australian Open	A	2R	SF	A		1R	A	QF	A		NH		QF	1R	A	1R	A	SF ('12)
U.S. Open	A	1R	F	A							NH			A		A		F ('12)
Canada Open	A		QF	A							NH		A	QF	A	A		QF ('12, '23)
Japan Open	A	1R	QF	1R	SF	2R	A	2R	2R	1R	NH		2R	1R	1R	A	1R	SF ('14)
China Open	A		1R	1R	1R	1R	A	QF	1R	QF	NH			1R	A		1R	QF ('17, '19)
Hong Kong Open	A	1R	1R	1R	1R	1R	2R	1R	1R	QF	NH			1R	A	SF		SF ('25)
China Masters	A	1R	A	1R	A				1R	1R	NH			2R	A			2R ('24)
Korea Open	1R	A		2R	1R	A		1R	2R	QF	NH		A	1R	A			QF ('19)
Arctic Open	NH													1R	A			1R ('23)
Denmark Open	1R	A	1R	2R	2R	1R	A	2R	A	1R	A	1R	2R	1R	A			2R ('13, '14, '17, '22)
French Open	A		1R	QF	1R	2R	A	1R	A	1R	NH	2R	QF	2R	2R	A		QF ('13, '22)
Japan Masters	NH													1R	A	SF		SF ('25)
Syed Modi International	A			NH	A						NH		A	F	A			F ('23)
Dutch Open	QF	A									NH	N/A						QF ('10)
Russian Open	A	SF	A								NH							SF ('11)
Year-end ranking	132	40	26	19	25	20	260	40	75	23	19	17	12	21	32	142		12
Tournament	2010	2011	2012	2013	2014	2015	2016	2017	2018	2019	2020	2021	2022	2023	2024	2025	2026	Best

== Record against selected opponents ==
Record against year-end Finals finalists, World Championships semi-finalists, and Olympic quarter-finalists. Accurate as of 23 August 2026.

=== Ayaka Takahashi ===
Players	M	W	L	Diff.
(Australia) Leanne Choo & Renuga Veeran	1	1	0	+1
(Bulgaria) Gabriela Stoeva & Stefani Stoeva	7	4	3	+1
(China) Chen Qingchen & Jia Yifan	11	5	6	–1
(China) Du Jing & Yu Yang	1	0	1	–1
(China) Du Yue & Li Yinhui	10	6	4	+2
(China) Luo Ying & Luo Yu	9	7	2	+5
(China) Ma Jin & Tang Jinhua	4	0	4	–4
(China) Ma Jin & Wang Xiaoli	1	0	1	–1
(China) Tang Yuanting & Yu Yang	5	3	2	+1
(China) Tian Qing & Zhao Yunlei	15	6	9	–3
(China) Wang Xiaoli & Yu Yang	5	1	4	–3
(Chinese Taipei) Cheng Wen-hsing & Chien Yu-chin	3	0	3	–3
(Denmark) Christinna Pedersen & Kamilla Rytter Juhl	17	11	6	+5
(India) Jwala Gutta & Ashwini Ponnappa	3	3	0	+3
(Indonesia) Nitya Krishinda Maheswari & Greysia Polii	5	3	2	+1
(Indonesia) Greysia Polii & Apriyani Rahayu	12	10	2	+8
(Japan) Mizuki Fujii & Reika Kakiiwa	6	2	4	–2
(Japan) Naoko Fukuman & Kurumi Yonao	11	10	1	+9

Players	M	W	L	Diff.
(Japan) Yuki Fukushima & Sayaka Hirota	11	4	7	–3
(Japan) Reika Kakiiwa & Miyuki Maeda	5	5	0	+5
(Japan) Miyuki Maeda & Satoko Suetsuna	3	1	2	–1
(Japan) Mayu Matsumoto & Wakana Nagahara	8	4	4	0
(Japan) Nami Matsuyama & Chiharu Shida	1	0	1	–1
(Japan) Shiho Tanaka & Koharu Yonemoto	8	5	3	+2
(Malaysia) Vivian Hoo Kah Mun & Woon Khe Wei	11	11	0	+11
(Malaysia) Chin Eei Hui & Wong Pei Tty	1	0	1	–1
(Netherlands) Eefje Muskens & Selena Piek	6	6	0	+6
(Russia) Valeria Sorokina & Nina Vislova	2	1	1	0
(South Korea) Chang Ye-na & Lee So-hee	4	4	0	+4
(South Korea) Eom Hye-won & Chang Ye-na	1	1	0	+1
(South Korea) Ha Jung-eun & Kim Min-jung	3	0	3	–3
(South Korea) Jung Kyung-eun & Shin Seung-chan	7	5	2	+3
(South Korea) Kim So-yeong & Kong Hee-yong	6	5	1	+4
(South Korea) Lee So-hee & Shin Seung-chan	13	7	6	+1
(Thailand) Puttita Supajirakul & Sapsiree Taerattanachai	8	7	1	+6

=== Kenichi Hayakawa ===
Players	M	W	L	Diff.
(China) Liu Cheng & Bao Yixin	5	0	5	–5
(China) Xu Chen & Ma Jin	1	0	1	–1
(China) Zhang Nan & Zhao Yunlei	5	0	5	–5
(Chinese Taipei) Chen Hung-ling & Cheng Wen-hsing	3	0	3	–3
(Denmark) Joachim Fischer Nielsen & Christinna Pedersen	4	0	4	–4
(Denmark) Thomas Laybourn & Kamilla Rytter Juhl	1	0	1	–1
(England) Chris Adcock & Imogen Bankier	3	1	2	–1
(England) Chris Adcock & Gabrielle Adcock	5	1	4	–3

Players	M	W	L	Diff.
(Hong Kong) Lee Chun Hei & Chau Hoi Wah	3	1	2	–1
(Indonesia) Nova Widianto & Vita Marissa	1	0	1	–1
(Indonesia) Praveen Jordan & Debby Susanto	1	0	1	–1
(Indonesia) Tontowi Ahmad & Liliyana Natsir	5	0	5	–5
(Malaysia) Chan Peng Soon & Goh Liu Ying	1	0	1	–1
(Poland) Robert Mateusiak & Nadieżda Zięba	1	0	1	–1
(South Korea) Ko Sung-hyun & Kim Ha-na	1	0	1	–1
(Thailand) Sudket Prapakamol & Saralee Thungthongkam	4	2	2	0

=== Yuki Kaneko ===
Players	M	W	L	Diff.
(China) Feng Yanzhe & Huang Dongping	1	0	1	–1
(China) Jiang Zhenbang & Wei Yaxin	4	0	4	–4
(China) Zhang Nan & Li Yinhui	1	0	1	–1
(China) Zheng Siwei & Huang Yaqiong	8	0	8	–8
(England) Chris Adcock & Gabrielle Adcock	1	0	1	–1
(England) Marcus Ellis & Lauren Smith	1	1	0	+1
(France) Thom Gicquel & Delphine Delrue	3	1	2	–1
(Hong Kong) Tang Chun Man & Tse Ying Suet	7	2	5	–3
(Indonesia) Praveen Jordan & Melati Daeva Oktavianti	4	3	1	+2

Players	M	W	L	Diff.
(Indonesia) Tontowi Ahmad & Liliyana Natsir	1	0	1	–1
(Japan) Kyohei Yamashita & Naru Shinoya	4	2	2	0
(Japan) Yuta Watanabe & Arisa Higashino	6	1	5	–4
(Malaysia) Chan Peng Soon & Goh Liu Ying	2	1	1	0
(Malaysia) Chen Tang Jie & Toh Ee Wei	2	2	0	+2
(South Korea) Kim Won-ho & Jeong Na-eun	1	0	1	–1
(South Korea) Seo Seung-jae & Chae Yoo-jung	6	0	6	–6
(Thailand) Dechapol Puavaranukroh & Sapsiree Taerattanachai	6	0	6	–6

=== Yugo Kobayashi ===
Players	M	W	L	Diff.
(China) Wang Yilyu & Huang Dongping	2	0	2	–2
(China) Zhang Nan & Li Yinhui	1	0	1	–1
(China) Zheng Siwei & Chen Qingchen	1	0	1	–1
(China) Zheng Siwei & Huang Yaqiong	1	0	1	–1
(England) Chris Adcock & Gabrielle Adcock	2	2	0	+2
(England) Marcus Ellis & Lauren Smith	1	0	1	–1
(Indonesia) Praveen Jordan & Debby Susanto	1	0	1	–1
(Indonesia) Tontowi Ahmad & Liliyana Natsir	1	0	1	–1

=== Yuta Watanabe ===
Players	M	W	L	Diff.
(China) Feng Yanzhe & Huang Dongping	1	0	1	–1
(France) Thom Gicquel & Delphine Delrue	1	1	0	+1

=== Hiroki Midorikawa ===
Players	M	W	L	Diff.
(China) Jiang Zhenbang & Wei Yaxin	1	0	1	–1

=== Kenta Kazuno ===
Players	M	W	L	Diff.
(Denmark) Joachim Fischer Nielsen & Christinna Pedersen	1	0	1	–1

=== Chiharu Shida ===
Players	M	W	L	Diff.
(China) Li Yijing & Luo Xumin	1	0	1	–1
