= Ou Dongni =

Chinese badminton player

Ou Dongni 区冬妮
Personal information
- Born: 7 February 1993 (age 33) Guangdong, China

Sport
- Country: China
- Sport: Badminton
- Handedness: Right
- Highest ranking: 10 (14 May 2015)
- BWF profile
Medal record
Women's badminton
Representing China
East Asian Games
Gold medal – first place	2013 Tianjin	Women's doubles
Gold medal – first place	2013 Tianjin	Women's team
Summer Universiade
Silver medal – second place	2015 Gwangju	Mixed team
World Junior Championships
Gold medal – first place	2010 Guadalajara	Mixed team
Gold medal – first place	2010 Guadalajara	Girls' doubles
Asian Junior Championships
Gold medal – first place	2010 Kuala Lumpur	Mixed team
Gold medal – first place	2011 Lucknow	Mixed team
Silver medal – second place	2010 Kuala Lumpur	Girls' doubles
Silver medal – second place	2011 Lucknow	Mixed doubles
Bronze medal – third place	2011 Lucknow	Girls' doubles

Ou Dongni (Chinese: 区冬妮; pinyin: Oū Dōngnī; born 7 February 1993) is a badminton player from China. She won the 2015 Singapore Super Series with Yu Xiaohan.

== Achievements ==
=== East Asian Games ===
Women's doubles
Year	Venue	Partner	Opponent	Score	Result
2013	Binhai New Area Dagang Gymnasium; Tianjin, China	(China) Tang Yuanting	(Japan) Yuriko Miki (Japan) Koharu Yonemoto	21–8, 21–11	Gold

=== BWF World Junior Championships ===
Girls' doubles
Year	Venue	Partner	Opponent	Score	Result
2010	Domo del Code Jalisco; Guadalajara, Mexico	(China) Bao Yixin	(China) Tang Jinhua (China) Xia Huan	21–13, 21–18	Gold

=== Asian Junior Championships ===
Girls' doubles
Year	Venue	Partner	Opponent	Score	Result
2010	Stadium Juara; Kuala Lumpur, Malaysia	(China) Bao Yixin	(China) Tang Jinhua (China) Xia Huan	17–21, 8-21	Silver
2011	Babu Banarasi Das Indoor Stadium; Lucknow, India	(China) Xiong Rui	(Malaysia) Chow Mei Kuan (Malaysia) Lee Meng Yean	17–21, 21–17, 16–21	Bronze

Mixed doubles
Year	Venue	Partner	Opponent	Score	Result
2011	Babu Banarasi Das Indoor Stadium; Lucknow, India	(China) Pei Tianyi	(Indonesia) Lukhi Apri Nugroho (Indonesia) Ririn Amelia	21–15, 16–21, 23–25	Silver

=== BWF Superseries ===
The BWF Superseries, which was launched on 14 December 2006 and implemented in 2007, is a series of elite badminton tournaments, sanctioned by the Badminton World Federation (BWF). BWF Superseries levels are Superseries and Superseries Premier. A season of Superseries consists of twelve tournaments around the world that have been introduced since 2011. Successful players are invited to the Superseries Finals, which are held at the end of each year.

Women's doubles
Year	Tournament	Partner	Opponent	Score	Result
2013	Hong Kong Open	(China) Tang Yuanting	(China) Bao Yixin (China) Tang Jinhua	21–18, 16–21, 15–21	(silver) Runner-up
2015	Singapore Open	(China) Yu Xiaohan	(Japan) Misaki Matsutomo (Japan) Ayaka Takahashi	21–17, 21–16	(gold) Winner

BWF Super Series Finals tournament
BWF Super Series Premier tournament
BWF Super Series tournament

=== BWF Grand Prix ===
The BWF Grand Prix had two levels, the BWF Grand Prix and Grand Prix Gold. It was a series of badminton tournaments sanctioned by the Badminton World Federation (BWF) which was held from 2007 to 2017.

Women's doubles
Year	Tournament	Partner	Opponent	Score	Result
2013	New Zealand Open	(China) Tang Yuanting	(Malaysia) Vivian Hoo (Malaysia) Woon Khe Wei	21–15, 11–21, 21–19	(gold) Winner
2014	Malaysia Grand Prix Gold	(China) Xiong Mengjing	(China) Huang Yaqiong (China) Yu Xiaohan	20–22, 21–12, 18–21	(silver) Runner-up
2014	Bitburger Open	(China) Yu Xiaohan	(Russia) Ekaterina Bolotova (Russia) Evgeniya Kosetskaya	21–10, 21–18	(gold) Winner
2014	Macau Open	(China) Yu Xiaohan	(China) Huang Yaqiong (China) Zhong Qianxin	19–21, 21–19, 21–7	(gold) Winner

Grand Prix Gold Tournament
Grand Prix Tournament

=== BWF International Challenge/Series ===
Women's doubles
Year	Tournament	Partner	Opponent	Score	Result
2014	China International	(China) Xiong Mengjing	(China) Luo Ying (China) Luo Yu	13–21, 12–21	(silver) Runner-up
2015	China International	(China) Yu Xiaohan	(Japan) Ayane Kurihara (Japan) Naru Shinoya	14–21, 21–18, 23–21	(gold) Winner

Mixed doubles
Year	Tournament	Partner	Opponent	Score	Result
2014	China International	(China) Wang Yilyu	(China) Zhang Wen (China) Xia Huan	21–18, 15–21, 21–19	(gold) Winner

BWF International Challenge tournament
BWF International Series tournament
