= Yu Xiaohan =

Chinese badminton player (born 1997)

Yu Xiaohan 于小含
Personal information
- Born: 29 September 1994 (age 32) Huaibei, Anhui, China

Sport
- Country: China
- Sport: Badminton
- Handedness: Right
- Retired: 30 September 2019

Women's doubles
- Highest ranking: 9 (3 May 2018)
- BWF profile
Medal record
Women's badminton
Representing China
Asia Mixed Team Championships
Bronze medal – third place	2017 Ho Chi Minh	Mixed team
World Junior Championships
Gold medal – first place	2012 Chiba	Mixed team
Silver medal – second place	2012 Chiba	Girls' doubles
Asian Junior Championships
Gold medal – first place	2011 Lucknow	Mixed team
Silver medal – second place	2012 Gimcheon	Mixed team
Silver medal – second place	2012 Gimcheon	Girls' doubles

Yu Xiaohan (Chinese: 于小含; pinyin: Yú Xiǎohán) is a retired badminton player from China. She won the 2015 Singapore Super Series with Ou Dongni. Yu was suspended for 7 months by BWF because one of her sample during 2015 Summer Universiade contained sibutramine. She announced her retirement through her personal social media Weibo on 13 October 2019, where before, she had given a resignation letter to the coach on 30 September 2019.

== Achievements ==
=== BWF World Junior Championships ===
Girls' doubles
Year	Venue	Partner	Opponent	Score	Result
2012	Chiba Port Arena; Chiba, Japan	(China) Huang Yaqiong	(South Korea) Lee So-hee (South Korea) Shin Seung-chan	14–21, 21–18, 18–21	Silver

=== Asian Junior Championships ===
Girls' doubles
Year	Venue	Partner	Opponent	Score	Result
2012	Gimcheon Indoor Stadium; Gimcheon, South Korea	(China) Huang Yaqiong	(South Korea) Lee So-hee (South Korea) Shin Seung-chan	21–17, 15–21, 17–21	Silver

=== BWF World Tour ===
The BWF World Tour, which was announced on 19 March 2017 and implemented in 2018, is a series of elite badminton tournaments sanctioned by the Badminton World Federation (BWF). The BWF World Tours are divided into levels of World Tour Finals, Super 1000, Super 750, Super 500, Super 300 (part of the HSBC World Tour), and the BWF Tour Super 100.

Women's doubles
Year	Tournament	Level	Partner	Opponent	Score	Result
2018	U.S. Open	Super 300	(China) Tang Jinhua	(South Korea) Kim Hye-jeong (South Korea) Kim So-yeong	18–21, 21–13, 21–15	(gold) Winner

=== BWF Superseries ===
The BWF Superseries, which was launched on 14 December 2006 and implemented in 2007, is a series of elite badminton tournaments, sanctioned by the Badminton World Federation (BWF). BWF Superseries levels are Superseries and Superseries Premier. A season of Superseries consists of twelve tournaments around the world that have been introduced since 2011. Successful players are invited to the Superseries Finals, which are held at the end of each year.

Women's doubles
Year	Tournament	Partner	Opponent	Score	Result
2015	Singapore Open	(China) Ou Dongni	(Japan) Misaki Matsutomo (Japan) Ayaka Takahashi	21–17, 21–16	(gold) Winner
2017	Korea Open	(China) Huang Yaqiong	(South Korea) Chang Ye-na (South Korea) Lee So-hee	21–11, 21–15	(gold) Winner

BWF Super Series Finals tournament
BWF Super Series Premier tournament
BWF Super Series tournament

=== BWF Grand Prix (7 titles, 4 runners-up) ===
The BWF Grand Prix had two levels, the BWF Grand Prix and Grand Prix Gold. It was a series of badminton tournaments sanctioned by the Badminton World Federation (BWF) which was held from 2007 to 2017.

Women's doubles
Year	Tournament	Partner	Opponent	Score	Result
2013	U.S. Open	(China) Huang Yaqiong	(China) Bao Yixin (China) Zhong Qianxin	17–21, 22–24	(silver) Runner-up
2013	Canada Open	(China) Huang Yaqiong	(Netherlands) Eefje Muskens (Netherlands) Selena Piek	13–21, 21–11, 21–13	(gold) Winner
2013	Macau Open	(China) Huang Yaqiong	(China) Bao Yixin (China) Tang Jinhua	17–21, 15–21	(silver) Runner-up
2014	India Grand Prix Gold	(China) Huang Yaqiong	(China) Chen Qingchen (China) Jia Yifan	24–22, 19–21, 11–21	(silver) Runner-up
2014	Malaysia Grand Prix Gold	(China) Huang Yaqiong	(China) Ou Dongni (China) Xiong Mengjing	22–20, 12–21, 21–18	(gold) Winner
2014	China Masters	(China) Huang Yaqiong	(China) Luo Ying (China) Luo Yu	17–21, 19–21	(silver) Runner-up
2014	Bitburger Open	(China) Ou Dongni	(Russia) Ekaterina Bolotova (Russia) Evgeniya Kosetskaya	21–10, 21–18	(gold) Winner
2014	Macau Open	(China) Ou Dongni	(China) Huang Yaqiong (China) Zhong Qianxin	19–21, 21–19, 21–7	(gold) Winner
2017	China Masters	(China) Bao Yixin	(China) Huang Yaqiong (China) Tang Jinhua	8–21, 21–14, 21–17	(gold) Winner
2017	Macau Open	(China) Huang Yaqiong	(South Korea) Baek Ha-na (South Korea) Lee Yu-rim	21–10, 21–17	(gold) Winner

Mixed doubles
Year	Tournament	Partner	Opponent	Score	Result
2014	Chinese Taipei Open	(China) Liu Yuchen	(Indonesia) Alfian Eko Prasetya (Indonesia) Annisa Saufika	21–16, 21–18	(gold) Winner

BWF Grand Prix Gold tournament
BWF Grand Prix tournament

=== BWF International Challenge/Series (2 titles, 1 runner-up) ===
Women's doubles
Year	Tournament	Partner	Opponent	Score	Result
2015	China International	(China) Ou Dongni	(Japan) Ayane Kurihara (Japan) Naru Shinoya	14–21, 21–18, 23–21	(gold) Winner
2019	Belarus International	(China) Zhang Shuxian	(England) Jenny Moore (England) Victoria Williams	21–12, 21–15	(gold) Winner

Mixed doubles
Year	Tournament	Partner	Opponent	Score	Result
2015	China International	(China) Liu Yuchen	(China) Zheng Siwei (China) Chen Qingchen	21–15, 12–21, 13–21	(silver) Runner-up

BWF International Challenge tournament
BWF International Series tournament
