= Malaysia Masters =

Annual badminton tournament

- Official website
- Founded: 1985; 41 years ago
- Editions: 18 (2026)
- Location: Kuala Lumpur (2026); Malaysia
- Venue: Unifi Arena (2026)
- Prize money: US$500,000 (2026)

Men's
- Draw: 32S / 32D
- Current champions: Li Shifeng (singles); Daniel Lundgaard; Mads Vestergaard (doubles)
- Most singles titles: 5 Lee Chong Wei
- Most doubles titles: 3 Koo Kien Keat; Tan Boon Heong

Women's
- Draw: 32S / 32D
- Current champions: Ratchanok Intanon (singles); Chen Fanshutian; Luo Xumin (doubles)
- Most singles titles: 3 Ratchanok Intanon
- Most doubles titles: 2 Christinna Pedersen; Kamilla Rytter Juhl

Mixed doubles
- Draw: 32
- Current champions: Gao Jiaxuan; Wei Yaxin
- Most titles (male): 3 Zheng Siwei
- Most titles (female): 3 Huang Yaqiong

Super 500
- Arctic Open; Australian Open; Hong Kong Open; Hylo Open; Indonesia Masters; Japan Masters; Korea Open; Malaysia Masters; Thailand Open

Last completed
- 2026 Malaysia Masters

The Malaysia Masters (Malay: Masters Malaysia) is an annual badminton tournament held in Malaysia that began in 1985. From 2009 until 2017, the tournament was part of the Grand Prix Gold series. The Badminton World Federation has categorised Malaysia Masters as one of the seven BWF World Tour Super 500 events in its events structure since 2018.

== Host cities ==
Since the Malaysia Masters began in 1985, it has been held in 7 cities across Malaysia.

City	Years host
Ipoh	1985
Johor Bahru	2009–2010, 2012, 2014
Alor Setar	2011
Kuala Lumpur	2013, 2018–2020, 2022–2026
Kuching	2015
George Town	2016
Sibu	2017

Locations of Malaysia Masters host cities

== Winners ==
Year	Men's singles	Women's singles	Men's doubles	Women's doubles	Mixed doubles	Ref
1985	(Denmark) Morten Frost	(China) Han Aiping	(China) Li Yongbo (China) Tian Bingyi	(China) Han Aiping (China) Li Lingwei	(Denmark) Steen Fladberg (England) Nora Perry	
1986– 2008	No competition					
2009	(Malaysia) Lee Chong Wei	(China) Wang Shixian	(Malaysia) Koo Kien Keat (Malaysia) Tan Boon Heong	(China) Ma Jin (China) Wang Xiaoli	(China) Zheng Bo (China) Ma Jin	
2010	(Malaysia) Lee Chong Wei	(Hong Kong) Yip Pui Yin	(Indonesia) Markis Kido (Indonesia) Hendra Setiawan	(Thailand) Duanganong Aroonkesorn (Thailand) Kunchala Voravichitchaikul	(Indonesia) Devin Lahardi Fitriawan (Indonesia) Liliyana Natsir	
2011	(Malaysia) Lee Chong Wei	(China) Wang Xin	(Malaysia) Koo Kien Keat (Malaysia) Tan Boon Heong	(Japan) Miyuki Maeda (Japan) Satoko Suetsuna	(Indonesia) Tontowi Ahmad (Indonesia) Liliyana Natsir	
2012	(Malaysia) Lee Chong Wei	(Thailand) Busanan Ongbamrungphan	(Malaysia) Koo Kien Keat (Malaysia) Tan Boon Heong	(Malaysia) Chin Eei Hui (Malaysia) Wong Pei Tty	(Malaysia) Chan Peng Soon (Malaysia) Goh Liu Ying	
2013	(Indonesia) Alamsyah Yunus	(India) P. V. Sindhu	(Malaysia) Goh V Shem (Malaysia) Lim Khim Wah	(Indonesia) Rizki Amelia Pradipta (Indonesia) Pia Zebadiah Bernadet	(Indonesia) Praveen Jordan (Indonesia) Vita Marissa	
2014	(Indonesia) Simon Santoso	(China) Yao Xue	(Singapore) Danny Bawa Chrisnanta (Singapore) Chayut Triyachart	(China) Huang Yaqiong (China) Yu Xiaohan	(China) Lu Kai (China) Huang Yaqiong	
2015	(South Korea) Lee Hyun-il	(Japan) Nozomi Okuhara	(Japan) Kenta Kazuno (Japan) Kazushi Yamada	(Denmark) Christinna Pedersen (Denmark) Kamilla Rytter Juhl	(Denmark) Joachim Fischer Nielsen (Denmark) Christinna Pedersen	
2016	(Malaysia) Lee Chong Wei	(India) P. V. Sindhu	(Indonesia) Marcus Fernaldi Gideon (Indonesia) Kevin Sanjaya Sukamuljo	(Japan) Misaki Matsutomo (Japan) Ayaka Takahashi	(China) Zheng Siwei (China) Li Yinhui	
2017	(Hong Kong) Ng Ka Long	(India) Saina Nehwal	(Indonesia) Berry Angriawan (Indonesia) Hardianto	(Thailand) Jongkolphan Kititharakul (Thailand) Rawinda Prajongjai	(Malaysia) Tan Kian Meng (Malaysia) Lai Pei Jing	
2018	(Denmark) Viktor Axelsen	(Thailand) Ratchanok Intanon	(Indonesia) Fajar Alfian (Indonesia) Muhammad Rian Ardianto	(Denmark) Christinna Pedersen (Denmark) Kamilla Rytter Juhl	(Hong Kong) Tang Chun Man (Hong Kong) Tse Ying Suet	
2019	(South Korea) Son Wan-ho	(Thailand) Ratchanok Intanon	(Indonesia) Marcus Fernaldi Gideon (Indonesia) Kevin Sanjaya Sukamuljo	(Japan) Yuki Fukushima (Japan) Sayaka Hirota	(Japan) Yuta Watanabe (Japan) Arisa Higashino	
2020	(Japan) Kento Momota	(China) Chen Yufei	(South Korea) Kim Gi-jung (South Korea) Lee Yong-dae	(China) Li Wenmei (China) Zheng Yu	(China) Zheng Siwei (China) Huang Yaqiong	
2021	No competition due to the COVID-19 pandemic					
2022	(Indonesia) Chico Aura Dwi Wardoyo	(South Korea) An Se-young	(Indonesia) Fajar Alfian (Indonesia) Muhammad Rian Ardianto	(China) Chen Qingchen (China) Jia Yifan	(China) Zheng Siwei (China) Huang Yaqiong	
2023	(India) Prannoy H. S.	(Japan) Akane Yamaguchi	(South Korea) Kang Min-hyuk (South Korea) Seo Seung-jae	(South Korea) Baek Ha-na (South Korea) Lee So-hee	(Thailand) Dechapol Puavaranukroh (Thailand) Sapsiree Taerattanachai	
2024	(Denmark) Viktor Axelsen	(China) Wang Zhiyi	(Denmark) Kim Astrup (Denmark) Anders Skaarup Rasmussen	(Japan) Rin Iwanaga (Japan) Kie Nakanishi	(Malaysia) Goh Soon Huat (Malaysia) Shevon Jemie Lai	
2025	(China) Li Shifeng	(China) Wang Zhiyi	(Malaysia) Man Wei Chong (Malaysia) Tee Kai Wun	(China) Liu Shengshu (China) Tan Ning	(China) Feng Yanzhe (China) Huang Dongping	
2026	(China) Li Shifeng	(Thailand) Ratchanok Intanon	(Denmark) Daniel Lundgaard (Denmark) Mads Vestergaard	(China) Chen Fanshutian (China) Luo Xumin	(China) Gao Jiaxuan (China) Wei Yaxin	

== Performances by nation ==
As of the 2026 edition

Pos	Nation	MS	WS	MD	WD	XD	Total
1	China	2	7	1	7	7	25
2	Malaysia	5		5	1	3	14
3	Indonesia	3		6	1	3	13
4	Japan	1	2	1	4	1	9
5	Denmark	3		2	2	1.5	8.5
6	Thailand		4		2	1	7
7	South Korea	2	1	2	1		6
8	India	1	3				4
9	Hong Kong	1	1			1	3
10	Singapore			1			1
11	England					0.5	0.5
Total		18	18	18	18	18	90
