= 2010 BWF World Junior Championships – mixed doubles =

2010 BWF World Junior Championships mixed doubles
Tournament details
- Dates: 21 April 2010 – 25 April 2010
- Edition: 12th
- Level: International
- Venue: CODE Dome
- Location: Guadalajara, Mexico

The mixed doubles event for the 2010 BWF World Junior Championships was held between 21 April and 25 April. Bao Yixin defended her title, this time with her new partner Liu Cheng.

== Seeded ==
1. (China) Liu Cheng / Bao Yixin (champion)
2. (Malaysia) Ow Yao Han / Lai Pei Jing (semi-final)
3. (China) Song Ziwei / Tang Jinhua (fourth round)
4. (China) Li Gen / Xia Huan (third round)
5. (China) Chen Zhuofu / Ou Dongni (quarter-final)
6. (India) Pranav Chopra / Prajakta Sawant (fourth round)
7. (South Korea) Choi Seung-Il / Park So-Young (fourth round)
8. (Japan) Shohei Hoshino / Naoko Fukuman (quarter-final)
9. (Denmark) Kim Astrup / Line Kjaersfeldt (quarter-final)
10. (Peru) Mario Cuba / Katherine Winder (fourth round)
11. (Russia) Denis Grachev / Anastasia Chervaykova (third round)
12. (England) Chris Coles / Jessica Fletcher (second round)
13. (England) Matthew Nottingham / Helena Lewczynska (fourth round)
14. (France) Lucas Corvee / Audrey Fontaine (second round)
15. (Germany) Max Schwenger / Isabel Herttrich (semi-final)
16. (Indonesia) Jones Rafli Jansen / Nurbeta Kwanrico (second round)

== Draw ==
=== Finals ===
Quarterfinals
1	(China) Liu Cheng (China) Bao Yixin	21	21
5/8	(China) Chen Zhuofu (China) Ou Dongni	12	15
(Malaysia) Teo Ee Yi (Malaysia) Lai Shevon Jemie	15	16
9/16	(Germany) Max Schwenger (Germany) Isabel Herttrich	21	21
5/8	(Japan) Shohei Hoshino (Japan) Naoko Fukuman	14	21	12
(South Korea) Kang Ji-Wook (South Korea) Choi Hye-In	21	17	21
9/16	(Denmark) Kim Astrup (Denmark) Line Kjaersfeldt	21	8	18
2	(Malaysia) Ow Yao Han (Malaysia) Lai Pei Jing	10	21	21

Semifinals
1	(China) Liu Cheng (China) Bao Yixin	21	21
9/16	(Germany) Max Schwenger (Germany) Isabel Herttrich	18	15
(South Korea) Kang Ji-Wook (South Korea) Choi Hye-In	21	21
2	(Malaysia) Ow Yao Han (Malaysia) Lai Pei Jing	19	14

Final
1	(China) Liu Cheng (China) Bao Yixin	21	21
(South Korea) Kang Ji-Wook (South Korea) Choi Hye-In	15	15

==== Top half ====
===== Section 1 =====
First round

Second round
1	(China) Liu C (China) Bao YX	21	21
(Turkey) R Ozturk (Turkey) N Yigit	14	6
(Canada) A Wilkinson (Canada) J Chan
(Mexico) A Ocegueda (Mexico) J Ascencio	WO
9/16	(England) M Nottingham (England) H Lewczynska	21	21
(Brazil) L dos Santos (Brazil) R Carvalho	17	6
(Mexico) A Sanchez (Mexico) A Chinas	13	15
(Germany) R Beck (Germany) L Bonnie	21	21

Third round
1	(China) Liu C (China) Bao YX	21	21
(Canada) A Wilkinson (Canada) J Chan	13	9
9/16	(England) M Nottingham (England) H Lewczynska	21	21
(Germany) R Beck (Germany) L Bonnie	14	13

Fourth round
1	(China) Liu C (China) Bao YX	21	21
9/16	(England) M Nottingham (England) H Lewczynska	19	14

===== Section 2 =====
First round
(Canada) N Choi (Canada) J Leung	19	17
(France) L Claerbout (France) L Meheust	21	21

Second round
5/8	(China) Chen ZF (China) Ou DN	21	21
(Japan) K Momota (Japan) M Matsutomo	11	15
(France) J Grosjean (France) L Palermo	21	21
(Austria) D Trojan (Austria) N Almer	8	11
9/16	(Russia) D Grachev (Russia) A Chervaykova	21	21
(South Africa) P Vijayanath (South Africa) E De Villiers	7	13
(Japan) Y Takeuchi (Japan) K Konishi	21	20	21
(France) L Claerbout (France) L Meheust	19	22	19

Third round
5/8	(China) Chen ZF (China) Ou DN	21	21
(France) J Grosjean (France) L Palermo	14	15
9/16	(Russia) D Grachev (Russia) A Chervaykova	13	21	21
(Japan) Y Takeuchi (Japan) K Konishi	21	19	23

Fourth round
5/8	(China) Chen ZF (China) Ou DN	21	21
(Japan) Y Takeuchi (Japan) K Konishi	16	10

===== Section 3 =====
First round
(Denmark) N Overgaard (Denmark) M Poulsen	22	21
(Canada) N Yakura (Canada) T Wong	20	8

Second round
3/4	(China) Li G (China) Xia H	21	21
(Guatemala) A Marroquin (Guatemala) N A Sotomayor	8	11
(Chinese Taipei) Lin C-y (Chinese Taipei) Lee F-y	21	21
(Turkey) E Vural (Turkey) O Bayrak	15	10
9/16	(Indonesia) J R Jansen (Indonesia) N Kwanrico	16	12
(Malaysia) Teo EY (Malaysia) S J Lai	21	21
(South Africa) A Malan (South Africa) J v d Berg	13	10
(Denmark) N Overgaard (Denmark) M Poulsen	21	21

Third round
3/4	(China) Li G (China) Xia H	20	23
(Chinese Taipei) Lin C-y (Chinese Taipei) Lee F-y	22	25
(Malaysia) Teo EY (Malaysia) S J Lai	17	21	21
(Denmark) N Overgaard (Denmark) M Poulsen	21	15	10

Fourth round
(Chinese Taipei) Lin C-y (Chinese Taipei) Lee F-y	17	13
(Malaysia) Teo EY (Malaysia) S J Lai	21	21

===== Section 4 =====
First round
(Chinese Taipei) Hsieh P-H (Chinese Taipei) Chiang M-H	21	21
(Peru) I De Vinatea (Peru) L Duany	6	15

Second round
5/8	(South Korea) Choi S-I (South Korea) Park S-Y	22	21
(India) M Attri (India) G Ghate	20	19
(Hong Kong) Ng KL (Hong Kong) Yuen SY	21	21
(Austria) V Vattanirappel (Austria) A Mathis	14	14
9/16	(Germany) M Schwenger (Germany) I Herttrich	21	21
(Peru) P Aguilar (Peru) L Zornoza	14	10
(Puerto Rico) A Roman (Puerto Rico) D Santana	9	11
(Chinese Taipei) Hsieh P-H (Chinese Taipei) Chiang M-H	21	21

Third round
5/8	(South Korea) Choi S-I (South Korea) Park S-Y	21	21
(Hong Kong) Ng KL (Hong Kong) Yuen SY	14	13
9/16	(Germany) M Schwenger (Germany) I Herttrich	17	21	21
(Chinese Taipei) Hsieh P-H (Chinese Taipei) Chiang M-H	21	14	15

Fourth round
5/8	(South Korea) Choi S-I (South Korea) Park S-Y	14	21	18
9/16	(Germany) M Schwenger (Germany) I Herttrich	21	14	21

==== Bottom half ====
===== Section 5 =====
First round
(Hong Kong) Tam CH (Hong Kong) Tsang WC	21	21
(Puerto Rico) A Aviles (Puerto Rico) I Gonzalez	6	13

Second round
(Hong Kong) Tam CH (Hong Kong) Tsang WC	21	21
(Puerto Rico) H Torres (Puerto Rico) G Medina	7	10
(Russia) K Abramov (Russia) M Korobeyinkova	15	24	18
9/16	(Peru) M Cuba (Peru) K Winder	21	22	21
(South Korea) Jung K-H (South Korea) Shin S-C	21	17	14
(Netherlands) J Middelburg (Netherlands) S Eijbergen	17	21	21
(Japan) T Kotaka (Japan) K Yonao	9	9
5/8	(Japan) S Hoshino (Japan) N Fukuman	21	21

Third round
(Hong Kong) Tam CH (Hong Kong) Tsang WC	12	9
9/16	(Peru) M Cuba (Peru) K Winder	21	21
(Netherlands) J Middelburg (Netherlands) S Eijbergen	8	16
5/8	(Japan) S Hoshino (Japan) N Fukuman	21	21

Fourth round
9/16	(Peru) M Cuba (Peru) K Winder	13	17
5/8	(Japan) S Hoshino (Japan) N Fukuman	21	21

===== Section 6 =====
First round
(Brazil) T Mantovani (Brazil) A Campos	12	15
(Austria) M Almer (Austria) S Kohlfurst	21	21

Second round
(Austria) M Almer (Austria) S Kohlfurst	15	21	16
(Turkey) E Lale (Turkey) N Kilic	21	19	21
(South Korea) Kang J-W (South Korea) Choi H-I	21	21
9/16	(England) C Coles (England) J Fletcher	17	13
(Peru) G Duany (Peru) K Marcenaro	13	14
(Germany) P Lang (Germany) K Kattenbeck	21	21
(Chinese Taipei) Huang P-J (Chinese Taipei) WU Y-L	16	18
3/4	(China) Song ZW (China) Tang JH	21	21

Third round
(Turkey) E Lale (Turkey) N Kilic	3	14
(South Korea) Kang J-W (South Korea) Choi H-I	21	21
(Germany) P Lang (Germany) K Kattenbeck	15	11
3/4	(China) Song ZW (China) Tang JH	21	21

Fourth round
(South Korea) Kang J-W (South Korea) Choi H-I	18	21	21
3/4	(China) Song ZW (China) Tang JH	21	12	11

===== Section 7 =====
First round
(Egypt) M El Sayad (Egypt) N Ashraf	WO
(Indonesia) D Prabudita (Indonesia) A Darajat

Second round
(Indonesia) D Prabudita (Indonesia) A Darajat	21	20	21
(Canada) M Diamond (Canada) S Kadam	16	22	10
(Hong Kong) Lee CH (Hong Kong) Yeung YK	15	18
9/16	(Denmark) K Astrup (Denmark) L Kjaersfeldt	21	21
(Thailand) W Ampunsuwan (Thailand) K Chonthicha	22	21
(England) S Dobson (England) H Rogers	20	12
(South Africa) J McManus (South Africa) L De Wet	8	7
5/8	(India) P Chopra (India) P Sawant	21	21

Third round
(Indonesia) D Prabudita (Indonesia) A Darajat	15	14
9/16	(Denmark) K Astrup (Denmark) L Kjaersfeldt	21	21
(Thailand) W Ampunsuwan (Thailand) K Chonthicha	12	16
5/8	(India) P Chopra (India) P Sawant	21	21

Fourth round
9/16	(Denmark) K Astrup (Denmark) L Kjaersfeldt	21	21
5/8	(India) P Chopra (India) P Sawant	19	15

===== Section 8 =====
First round
(South Korea) Park D-W (South Korea) Kim C-M	15	17
(Indonesia) W Nayaka (Indonesia) N Agustianti	21	21

Second round
(Indonesia) W Nayaka (Indonesia) N Agustianti	21	21
(Mexico) A Lopez (Mexico) C Gonzalez	13	12
(Russia) A Yartsev (Russia) E Kosetskaya	21	17	21
9/16	(France) L Corvee (France) A Fontaine	19	21	18
(South Africa) J Mortimer (South Africa) S Le Grange	12	21
(Netherlands) R Muns (Austria) E Widowitz	21	23
(Germany) F Holzer (Germany) F Deprez	15	16
2	(Malaysia) Ow YH (Malaysia) Lai PJ	21	21

Third round
(Indonesia) W Nayaka (Indonesia) N Agustianti	21	21
(Russia) A Yartsev (Russia) E Kosetskaya	16	19
(Netherlands) R Muns (Austria) E Widowitz	13	9
2	(Malaysia) Ow YH (Malaysia) Lai PJ	21	21

Fourth round
(Indonesia) W Nayaka (Indonesia) N Agustianti	9	17
2	(Malaysia) Ow YH (Malaysia) Lai PJ	21	21
