= 2013 London Grand Prix Gold =

Tournament details
- Dates: October 1, 2013 - October 6, 2013
- Total prize money: US$120,000
- Venue: The Copper Box Arena
- Location: London, England

The 2013 London Grand Prix Gold was the twelfth grand prix gold and grand prix tournament of the 2013 BWF Grand Prix Gold and Grand Prix. This tournament was held for the first time as part of London Grand Prix Gold. The tournament was held in The Copper Box Arena, London, England October 1 until October 6, 2013, and had a total purse of $120,000.

== Men's singles ==
=== Seeds ===
1. (Denmark) Jan Ø. Jørgensen (third round)
2. (Denmark) Hans-Kristian Vittinghus (final)
3. (Denmark) Viktor Axelsen (semi-final)
4. (England) Rajiv Ouseph (semi-final)
5. (Malaysia) Tan Chun Seang (third round)
6. (Malaysia) Mohd Arif Abdul Latif (withdrew)
7. (Finland) Ville Lång (third round)
8. (Singapore) Derek Wong (quarter-final)

=== Finals ===
Quarter-finals
(China) Tian Houwei	14	21	21
8	(Singapore) Derek Wong	21	14	10
4	(England) Rajiv Ouseph	21	21
(Malaysia) Zulfadli Zulkiffli	14	13
(China) Xue Song	16	19
3	(Denmark) Viktor Axelsen	21	21
(Indonesia) Riyanto Subagja	14	21	7
2	(Denmark) Hans-Kristian Vittinghus	21	11	21

Semi-finals
(China) Tian Houwei	21	21
4	(England) Rajiv Ouseph	18	14
3	(Denmark) Viktor Axelsen	19	18
2	(Denmark) Hans-Kristian Vittinghus	21	21

Final
(China) Tian Houwei	22	21
2	(Denmark) Hans-Kristian Vittinghus	20	16

=== Top half ===
==== Section 1 ====
First round
(China) Tian HW	21	13
(India) A Sridhar	15	9^{r}

Second round
1	(Denmark) J Ø Jorgensen	21	21
(Germany) L Schmidt	10	11
(Czech Republic) P Koukal	10	7^{r}
(China) Tian HW	21	10

Third round
1	(Denmark) J Ø Jorgensen	21	14	13
(China) Tian HW	18	21	21

==== Section 2 ====
First round
(England) S Parsons	11	4
(Denmark) C Thomsen	21	21
(Hong Kong) Chan YK	21	21
(England) T Stanford	5	9

Second round
8	(Singapore) D Wong	12	21	21
(Denmark) C Thomsen	21	10	12
(Republic of Ireland) S Evans	21	12	21
(Hong Kong) Chan YK	19	21	10

Third round
8	(Singapore) D Wong	21	21
(Republic of Ireland) S Evans	17	18

==== Section 3 ====
First round
(France) L Corvée	18	21	13
(Chinese Taipei) Hsu J-t	21	13	21

Second round
4	(England) R Ouseph	21	21
(Ukraine) V Konov	12	12
(England) R Walker	16	11
(Chinese Taipei) Hsu J-t	21	21

Third round
4	(England) R Ouseph	21	21
(Chinese Taipei) Hsu J-t	14	12

==== Section 4 ====
First round
(Indonesia) W Y Prasetyo	21	21
(England) A Kindred	6	4
(England) S Phillips	13	21	17
(Finland) E Heino	21	13	21

Second round
6	(Malaysia) A Abdul Latif	wo
(Indonesia) W Y Prasetyo
(Malaysia) Z Zulkiffli	21	21
(Finland) E Heino	14	19

Third round
(Indonesia) W Y Prasetyo	11	18
(Malaysia) Z Zulkiffli	21	21

=== Bottom half ===
==== Section 5 ====
First round
(New Zealand) J Wu	8	10
(Ukraine) D Zavadsky	21	21
(Chinese Taipei) Shih K-c	21	21
(England) A Lane	14	10

Second round
(Ukraine) D Zavadsky	13	18
(China) Xue S	21	21
(Chinese Taipei) Shih K-c	8	8
5	(Malaysia) Tan CS	21	21

Third round
(China) Xue S	14	21	21
5	(Malaysia) Tan CS	21	12	12

==== Section 6 ====
First round
(Sweden) H Hurskainen	21	25
(Czech Republic) J Fröhlich	18	23
(England) T Penty
(France) B Leverdez	w	/	o

Second round
(Sweden) H Hurskainen	21	21
(Hong Kong) Wei N	19	12
(France) B Leverdez	16	15
3	(Denmark) V Axelsen	21	21

Third round
(Sweden) H Hurskainen	10	12
3	(Denmark) V Axelsen	21	21

==== Section 7 ====
First round
(Germany) D Domke	3
(Czech Republic) M Ludík	0^{r}
(Scotland) K Merrilees	21	21
(England) B Muir	16	16

Second round
(Germany) D Domke	15	19
(Indonesia) R Subagja	21	21
(Scotland) K Merrilees	21	19	14
6	(Finland) V Lång	10	21	21

Third round
(Indonesia) R Subagja	21	21
6	(Finland) V Lång	17	17

==== Section 8 ====
First round
(England) S Dobson	10	16
(Denmark) J Persson	21	21

Second round
(Denmark) J Persson	17	24
(China) Huang YX	21	26
(England) M Spencer-Smith	6	9
2	(Denmark) H Vittinghus	21	21

Third round
(China) Huang YX	21	13	16
2	(Denmark) H Vittinghus	19	21	21

== Women's singles ==
=== Seeds ===
1. (Thailand) Busanan Ongbamrungphan (semi-final)
2. (Thailand) Porntip Buranaprasertsuk (first round)
3. (Spain) Carolina Marín (champion)
4. (France) Sashina Vignes Waran (second round)
5. (Scotland) Kirsty Gilmour (final)
6. (Czech Republic) Kristína Gavnholt (semi-final)
7. (Germany) Karin Schnaase (first round)
8. (China) Deng Xuan (quarter-final)

=== Finals ===
Semi-finals
1	(Thailand) Busanan Ongbamrungphan	22	18	19
3	(Spain) Carolina Marín	20	21	21
6	(Czech Republic) Kristína Gavnholt	13	22	16
5	(Scotland) Kirsty Gilmour	21	20	21

Final
3	(Spain) Carolina Marín	21	21
5	(Scotland) Kirsty Gilmour	19	9

=== Top half ===
==== Section 1 ====
First round
1	(Thailand) B Ongbamrungphan	21	21
(England) F Chapman	17	16
Q3	(England) C Birch	21	9	15
(England) S Milne	14	21	21
8	(China) Deng X	21	21
(Denmark) S Jensen	17	6
PFQ	(Denmark) N K Rhode	18	11
(Thailand) S Ponsana	21	21

Second round
1	(Thailand) B Ongbamrungphan	21	21
(England) S Milne	5	10
8	(China) Deng X	21	21
(Thailand) S Ponsana	14	13

Quarter-finals
1	(Thailand) B Ongbamrungphan	21	21
8	(China) Deng X	14	17

==== Section 2 ====
First round
3	(Spain) C Marín	21	21
(Denmark) L Clausen	15	13
(Denmark) A T Madsen	18	15
(Indonesia) M Wiranto	21	21
7	(Germany) K Schnaase	14	14
(Indonesia) H Desi	21	21
(Czech Republic) Z Pavelková	15	6
(New Zealand) M Chan	21	21

Second round
3	(Spain) C Marín	21	21
(Indonesia) M Wiranto	16	15
(Indonesia) H Desi	21	21
(New Zealand) M Chan	14	11

Quarter-finals
3	(Spain) C Marín	17	21	21
(Indonesia) H Desi	21	14	19

=== Bottom half ===
==== Section 3 ====
First round
(Republic of Ireland) C Magee	21	21
(Chinese Taipei) Chang Y-l	14	5
(England) P Riou	8	16
6	(Czech Republic) K Gavnholt	21	21
(Denmark) L Kjærsfeldt	21	20	10
Q1	(China) Wang X	18	22	21
(Wales) C Turner	12	21	17
4	(France) S Vignes Waran	21	19	21

Second round
(Republic of Ireland) C Magee	18	21	10
6	(Czech Republic) K Gavnholt	21	16	21
Q1	(China) Wang X	21	21
4	(France) S Vignes Waran	9	18

Quarter-finals
6	(Czech Republic) K Gavnholt	21	21
Q1	(China) Wang X	14	19

==== Section 4 ====
First round
(Indonesia) M F Kusumastuti	21	21
(China) Hui XR	18	18
(Austria) S Prutsch	11	14
5	(Scotland) K Gilmour	21	21
Q4	(United States) BW Zhang
(England) S Walker	w	/	o
Q2	(Japan) S Sato	22	21
2	(Thailand) P Buranaprasertsuk	20	19

Second round
(Indonesia) M F Kusumastuti	9	14
5	(Scotland) K Gilmour	21	21
(England) S Walker	14	12
Q2	(Japan) S Sato	21	21

Quarter-finals
5	(Scotland) K Gilmour	21	21
Q2	(Japan) S Sato	17	10

== Men's doubles ==
=== Seeds ===
1. (Denmark) Mathias Boe / Carsten Mogensen (champion)
2. (England) Chris Langridge / Peter Mills (second round)
3. (England) Marcus Ellis / (Scotland) Paul van Rietvelde (second round)
4. (Indonesia) Wahyu Nayaka / Ade Yusuf (semi-final)

=== Finals ===
Semi-finals
1	(Denmark) Mathias Boe (Denmark) Carsten Mogensen	21	21
4	(Indonesia) Wahyu Nayaka (Indonesia) Ade Yusuf	14	13
(Germany) Peter Käsbauer (Germany) Josche Zurwonne	21	13	11
(Indonesia) Berry Angriawan (Indonesia) Ricky Karanda Suwardi	19	21	21

Final
1	(Denmark) Mathias Boe (Denmark) Carsten Mogensen	21	21
(Indonesia) Berry Angriawan (Indonesia) Ricky Karanda Suwardi	13	16

=== Top half ===
==== Section 1 ====
First round
(France) L Corvée (France) B Leverdez	w	/	o
(England) G Fox (England) M Nottingham

Second round
1	(Denmark) M Boe (Denmark) C Mogensen	w	/	o
(Germany) M Fuchs (Germany) J Schöttler
(China) Kang J (China) Li G	19	21	11
(France) L Corvée (France) B Leverdez	21	17	21

Quarter-finals
1	(Denmark) M Boe (Denmark) C Mogensen	21	21
(France) L Corvée (France) B Leverdez	9	17

==== Section 2 ====
First round
(England) A Cheng (England) R McCarthy	13	14
(Chinese Taipei) Huang P-j (Chinese Taipei) Lu C-y	21	21

Second round
4	(Indonesia) W Nayaka (Indonesia) A Yusuf	21	21
(England) C Coles (England) A Ellis	15	14
(New Zealand) J Wu (Chinese Taipei) Shih K-c	10	17
(Chinese Taipei) Huang P-j (Chinese Taipei) Lu C-y	21	21

Quarter-finals
4	(Indonesia) W Nayaka (Indonesia) A Yusuf	21	21
(Chinese Taipei) Huang P-j (Chinese Taipei) Lu C-y	18	19

=== Bottom half ===
==== Section 3 ====
First round
(Germany) I Kindervater (Germany) M Schwenger
(Denmark) N Nøhr (Denmark) N Overgaard	w	/	o

Second round
(Denmark) N Nøhr (Denmark) N Overgaard	16	11
(England) P Briggs (England) H Towler	21	21
(Germany) P Käsbauer (Germany) J Zurwonne	21	21
3	(England) M Ellis (Scotland) P van Rietvelde	18	13

Quarter-finals
(England) P Briggs (England) H Towler	14	20
(Germany) P Käsbauer (Germany) J Zurwonne	21	22

==== Section 4 ====
First round
(Denmark) M Conrad-Petersen (Denmark) M P Kolding	21	21
(New Zealand) K Dennerly-Minturn (New Zealand) O Leydon-Davis	18	13

Second round
(Denmark) M Conrad-Petersen (Denmark) M P Kolding	21	27	21
(Denmark) K Astrup (Denmark) A S Rasmussen	9	29	16
(Indonesia) B Angriawan (Indonesia) R Suwardi	1
2	(England) C Langridge (England) P Mills	1^{r}

Quarter-finals
(Denmark) M Conrad-Petersen (Denmark) M P Kolding	19	21
(Indonesia) B Angriawan (Indonesia) R Suwardi	21	23

== Women's doubles ==
=== Seeds ===
1. (Denmark) Christinna Pedersen / Kamilla Rytter Juhl (champion)
2. (Germany) Birgit Michels / Johanna Goliszewski (second round)
3. (Singapore) Shinta Mulia Sari / Yao Lei (semi-final)
4. (England) Heather Olver / Kate Robertshaw (quarter-final)

=== Finals ===
Semi-finals
1	(Denmark) Christinna Pedersen (Denmark) Kamilla Rytter Juhl	22	21
(Singapore) Fu Mingtian (Singapore) Vanessa Neo	20	19
3	(Singapore) Shinta Mulia Sari (Singapore) Yao Lei	11	22	16
(Denmark) Line Damkjær Kruse (Denmark) Marie Røpke	21	20	21

Final
1	(Denmark) Christinna Pedersen (Denmark) Kamilla Rytter Juhl	12	21	21
(Denmark) Line Damkjær Kruse (Denmark) Marie Røpke	21	17	15

=== Top half ===
==== Section 1 ====
First round
(Indonesia) S R Andini (Indonesia) J Gozali	21	21
(China) Huang YQ (China) Zhu MC	15	15

Second round
1	(Denmark) C Pedersen (Denmark) K Rytter Juhl	21	21
(Germany) I Herttrich (Germany) C Nelte	12	11
(Denmark) M Helsbøl (Denmark) L Grebak	9	21	10
(Indonesia) S R Andini (Indonesia) J Gozali	21	14	21

Quarter-finals
1	(Denmark) C Pedersen (Denmark) K Rytter Juhl	21	21
(Indonesia) S R Andini (Indonesia) J Gozali	14	19

==== Section 2 ====
First round
(Wales) S Thomas (Wales) C Turner	10	16
(Thailand) P Buranaprasertsuk (Thailand) B Ongbamrungphan	21	21
(Malaysia) Ng HE (Malaysia) Ng HL	21	17	21
(Singapore) Fu MT (Singapore) V Neo	12	21	23

Second round
4	(England) H Olver (England) K Robertshaw	16	21	21
(Thailand) P Buranaprasertsuk (Thailand) B Ongbamrungphan	21	16	18
(England) J Moore (England) V Williams	8	7
(Singapore) Fu MT (Singapore) V Neo	21	21

Quarter-finals
4	(England) H Olver (England) K Robertshaw	17	10
(Singapore) Fu MT (Singapore) V Neo	21	21

=== Bottom half ===
==== Section 3 ====
First round
(England) L Aung (England) B Miller	8	8
(Thailand) N Lam (Thailand) S Amitrapai	21	21
(England) C Birch (England) L Smith	16	12
(Indonesia) A S Awanda (Indonesia) D D Haris	21	21

Second round
(Thailand) N Lam (Thailand) S Amitrapai	21	14
(China) Du P (China) Xiong MJ	23	21
(Indonesia) A S Awanda (Indonesia) D D Haris	20	15
3	(Singapore) S M Sari (Singapore) Yao L	22	21

Quarter-finals
(China) Du P (China) Xiong MJ	18	21	14
3	(Singapore) S M Sari (Singapore) Yao L	21	17	21

==== Section 4 ====
First round
(England) F Chapman (England) H Lewczynska	10	20
(Denmark) L D Kruse (Denmark) M Røpke	21	22

Second round
(Denmark) L D Kruse (Denmark) M Røpke	21	21
(England) S Brown (England) A Lim	18	12
(Scotland) J Cooper (Scotland) K Gilmour	22	21
2	(Germany) B Michels (Germany) J Goliszewski	20	11

Quarter-finals
(Denmark) L D Kruse (Denmark) M Røpke	19	21	21
(Scotland) J Cooper (Scotland) K Gilmour	21	17	9

== Mixed doubles ==
=== Seeds ===
1. (Singapore) Danny Bawa Chrisnanta / Vanessa Neo (semi-final)
2. (Germany) Michael Fuchs / Birgit Michels (champion)
3. (England) Chris Langridge / Heather Olver (final)
4. (Indonesia) Irfan Fadhilah / Weni Anggraini (semi-final)

=== Finals ===
Semi-finals
1	(Singapore) Danny Bawa Chrisnanta (Singapore) Vanessa Neo	15	15
3	(England) Chris Langridge (England) Heather Olver	21	21
4	(Indonesia) Irfan Fadhilah (Indonesia) Weni Anggraini	21	19	20
2	(Germany) Michael Fuchs (Germany) Birgit Michels	19	21	22

Final
3	(England) Chris Langridge (England) Heather Olver	19	14
2	(Germany) Michael Fuchs (Germany) Birgit Michels	21	21

=== Top half ===
==== Section 1 ====
First round
(Indonesia) E Subaktiar (Indonesia) G E Widjaja	w	/	d
(England) G Fox (England) S Brown	w	/	d

Second round
1	(Singapore) D B Chrisnanta (Singapore) V Neo	21	21
(England) G Mairs (England) J Moore	14	4
(Germany) P Käsbauer (Germany) I Herttrich
No match

Quarter-finals
1	(Singapore) D B Chrisnanta (Singapore) V Neo	21	21
(Germany) P Käsbauer (Germany) I Herttrich	19	9

==== Section 2 ====
First round
(Denmark) A S Rasmussen (Denmark) L Grebak	20	21	22
(Germany) M Schwenger (Germany) C Nelte	22	17	24

Second round
3	(England) C Langridge (England) H Olver	21	21
(England) A Ellis (England) L Smith	19	17
(Germany) J Schöttler (Germany) J Goliszewski
(Germany) M Schwenger (Germany) C Nelte	w	/	o

Quarter-finals
3	(England) C Langridge (England) H Olver	21	21
(Germany) M Schwenger (Germany) C Nelte	17	19

=== Bottom half ===
==== Section 3 ====
First round
(New Zealand) J Wu (Chinese Taipei) Chang Y-l	15	13
(Sweden) N Ruponen (Sweden) A Högström	21	21
(Denmark) K Astrup (Denmark) M Helsbøl	21	23	21
(England) C Coles (England) A Lim	17	25	19

Second round
(Sweden) N Ruponen (Sweden) A Högström	21	20	15
(Republic of Ireland) S Magee (Republic of Ireland) C Magee	17	22	21
(Denmark) K Astrup (Denmark) M Helsbøl	18	8
4	(Indonesia) I Fadhilah (Indonesia) W Anggraini	21	16^{r}

Quarter-finals
(Republic of Ireland) S Magee (Republic of Ireland) C Magee	19	15
4	(Indonesia) I Fadhilah (Indonesia) W Anggraini	21	21

==== Section 4 ====
First round
(China) Kang J (China) Huang YQ	14	21	12
(Indonesia) L A Nugroho (Indonesia) A Saufika	21	15	21

Second round
(Indonesia) L A Nugroho (Indonesia) A Saufika	21	21
(England) H Towler (England) H Lewczynska	11	12
(England) M Nottingham (England) E Westwood	12	11
2	(Germany) M Fuchs (Germany) B Michels	21	21

Quarter-finals
(Indonesia) L A Nugroho (Indonesia) A Saufika	15	18
2	(Germany) M Fuchs (Germany) B Michels	21	21

Preceded by 2013 Russia Open Grand Prix	BWF Grand Prix Gold and Grand Prix; 2013 season	Succeeded by 2013 Dutch Open Grand Prix
