= 2010 BWF World Junior Championships – girls' doubles =

2010 BWF World Junior Championships girls' doubles
Tournament details
- Dates: 21 April 2010 – 25 April 2010
- Edition: 12th
- Level: International
- Venue: CODE Dome
- Location: Guadalajara, Mexico

The girls' doubles event for the 2010 BWF World Junior Championships was held between 21 April and 25 April. Bao Yixin and Ou Dongni from China won the title.

== Seeded ==
1. (China) Tang Jinhua / Xia Huan (final)
2. (China) Bao Yixin / Ou Dongni (champion)
3. (Malaysia) Sonia Cheah Su Ya / Yang Li Lian (second round)
4. (South Korea) Choi Hye-In / Lee So-Hee (semi-final)
5. (Malaysia) Lai Pei Jing / Lai Shevon Jemie (third round)
6. (India) Gauri Ghate / Prajakta Sawant (second round)
7. (Japan) Ayumi Mine / Kurumi Yonao (quarter-final)
8. (Germany) Fabienne Deprez / Isabel Herttrich (quarter-final)

== Draw ==
=== Finals ===
Semifinals
1	(China) Tang Jinhua (China) Xia Huan	20	21	21
3/4	(South Korea) Choi Hye-In (South Korea) Lee So-Hee	22	13	15
(Denmark) Sandra-Maria Jensen (Denmark) Line Kjaersfeldt	15	7
2	(China) Bao Yixin (China) Ou Dongni	21	21

Final
1	(China) Tang Jinhua (China) Xia Huan	13	18
2	(China) Bao Yixin (China) Ou Dongni	21	21

==== Section 1 ====
First round
(England) H Lewczynska (England) H Rogers	21	21
(Puerto Rico) G Medina (France) L Meheust	9	14
(Brazil) A Campos (Brazil) R Carvalho	7	5
(Japan) K Konishi (Japan) S Takahashi	21	21

Second round
1	(China) Tang JH (China) Xia H	21	21
(Canada) S Kadam (Canada) J Leung	8	7
(South Africa) E De Villiers (South Africa) L De Wet	14	9
(England) H Lewczynska (England) H Rogers	21	21
5/8	(Malaysia) Lai PJ (Malaysia) Lai SJ	21	21
(Peru) L Duany (Peru) K Winder	15	12
(Singapore) Cheong HM (Singapore) N Goh	12	8
(Japan) K Konishi (Japan) S Takahashi	21	21

Third round
1	(China) Tang JH (China) Xia H	21	21
(England) H Lewczynska (England) H Rogers	10	13
5/8	(Malaysia) Lai PJ (Malaysia) Lai SJ	18	22
(Japan) K Konishi (Japan) S Takahashi	21	24

Quarterfinal
1	(China) Tang JH (China) Xia H	21	21
(Japan) K Konishi (Japan) S Takahashi	12	9

==== Section 2 ====
First round
(Turkey) N Kilic (Turkey) N Yigit	21	21
(Puerto Rico) I Gonzalez (Puerto Rico) D Santana	12	11
(Hong Kong) Yeung YK (Hong Kong) Yuen SY	21	21
(Austria) N Almer (Austria) E Widowitz	14	8

Second round
3/4	(South Korea) Choi H-I (South Korea) Lee S-H	21	21
(Mexico) C Gonzalez (Mexico) M Ugalde	7	4
(Egypt) N Ashraf (Egypt) A Tayssir	WO
(Turkey) N Kilic (Turkey) N Yigit
5/8	(Germany) F Deprez (Germany) I Herttrich	21	21
(Denmark) C Juel (Denmark) M Poulsen	17	12
(Chinese Taipei) Lee F-Y (Chinese Taipei) Wu Y-L	21	22
(Hong Kong) Yeung YK (Hong Kong) Yuen SY	19	20

Third round
3/4	(South Korea) Choi H-I (South Korea) Lee S-H	21	21
(Turkey) N Kilic (Turkey) N Yigit	5	7
5/8	(Germany) F Deprez (Germany) I Herttrich	21	2
(Chinese Taipei) Lee F-Y (Chinese Taipei) Wu Y-L	18	20

Quarterfinal
3/4	(South Korea) Choi H-I (South Korea) Lee S-H	21	21
5/8	(Germany) F Deprez (Germany) I Herttrich	19	14

==== Section 3 ====
First round
(Denmark) S Jensen (Denmark) L Kjaersfeldt	21	21
(South Africa) S Le Grange (South Africa) J van den Berg	7	11
(Germany) K Kattenbeck (Austria) A Mathis	21	21
(Mexico) A Chinas (Mexico) T Nunez	2	12

Second round
(Denmark) S Jensen (Denmark) L Kjaersfeldt
(South Korea) Kim C-M (South Korea) Shin S-C	WO
(Indonesia) A Darajat (Indonesia) N Kwanrico	21	15	21
5/8	(India) G Ghate (India) P Sawant	11	21	18
(Germany) K Kattenbeck (Austria) A Mathis	28	21	21
(Germany) L Bonnie (Austria) S Kohlfurst	30	18	19
(Russia) A Chervaykova (Russia) M Korobeyinkova	21	23	21
3/4	(Malaysia) S Cheah (Malaysia) Yang YY	9	25	18

Third round
(Denmark) S Jensen (Denmark) L Kjaersfeldt	21	19	21
(Indonesia) A Darajat (Indonesia) N Kwanrico	8	21	19
(Germany) K Kattenbeck (Austria) A Mathis	10	13
(Russia) A Chervaykova (Russia) M Korobeyinkova	21	21

Quarterfinal
(Denmark) S Jensen (Denmark) L Kjaerseldt	14	21	21
(Russia) A Chervaykova (Russia) M Korobeyinkova	21	17	18

==== Section 4 ====
First round
(England) J Fletcher (England) S Milne	21	21
(Canada) J Chan (Canada) S Yeung	11	19
(Peru) K Marcenaro (Peru) L Zornoza	8	9
(Thailand) K Chonthicha (Thailand) P Panjarat	21	21

Second round
(England) J Fletcher (England) S Milne	10	13
(Turkey) O Bayrak (Turkey) E Tunali	21	21
(Netherlands) T Peters (Netherlands) J Wentholt	11	21	17
5/8	(Japan) A Mine (Japan) K Yonao	21	17	21
(Thailand) K Chonthicha (Thailand) P Panjarat	21	25
(France) A Fontaine (France) L Palermo	18	23
(Singapore) E Chua (Singapore) Tan WH	5	6
2	(China) Bao YX (China) Ou DN	21	21

Third round
(Turkey) O Bayrak (Turkey) E Tunali	11	14
5/8	(Japan) A Mine (Japan) K Yonao	21	21
(Thailand) K Chonthicha (Thailand) P Panjarat	8	23
2	(China) Bao YX (China) Ou DN	21	25

Quarterfinal
5/8	(Japan) A Mine (Japan) K Yonao	17	10
2	(China) Bao YX (China) Ou DN	21	21
