= Inken Wienefeld =

German badminton player (born 1992)

Personal information
- Born: 24 February 1992 (age 34) Hamburg, Germany

Sport
- Country: Germany
- Sport: Badminton
- Handedness: Right

Women's
- Highest ranking: 336 (WS) 21 Jan 2010; 71 (WD) 20 Sep 2012; 338 (XD) 22 Oct 2009
- BWF profile
Medal record
Badminton
Representing Germany
European Junior Championships
Gold medal – first place	2011 Vantaa	Mixed team
Bronze medal – third place	2011 Vantaa	Girls' doubles
Bronze medal – third place	2009 Milan	Mixed team

Inken Wienefeld (born 24 February 1992) is a German female badminton player. In 2011, she won bronze medal at the European Junior Badminton Championships in girls' doubles event with Isabel Herttrich.

== Achievements ==
=== European Junior Badminton Championships ===
Girls' Doubles

Year	Venue	Partner	Opponent	Score	Result
2011	Vantaan Energia Arena, Vantaa, Finland	(Germany) Isabel Herttrich	(Denmark) Mette Poulsen (Denmark) Ditte Strunge Larsen	22–20, 14–21, 18–21	Bronze

=== BWF International Challenge/Series ===
Women's Doubles

Year	Tournament	Partner	Opponent	Score	Result
2012	Slovenia International	(Germany) Isabel Herttrich	(Wales) Sarah Thomas (Wales) Carissa Turner	21–14, 13–21, 21–17	(gold) Winner

BWF International Challenge tournament
BWF International Series tournament
BWF Future Series tournament
