= Jim Middelburg =

Dutch badminton player (born 1993)

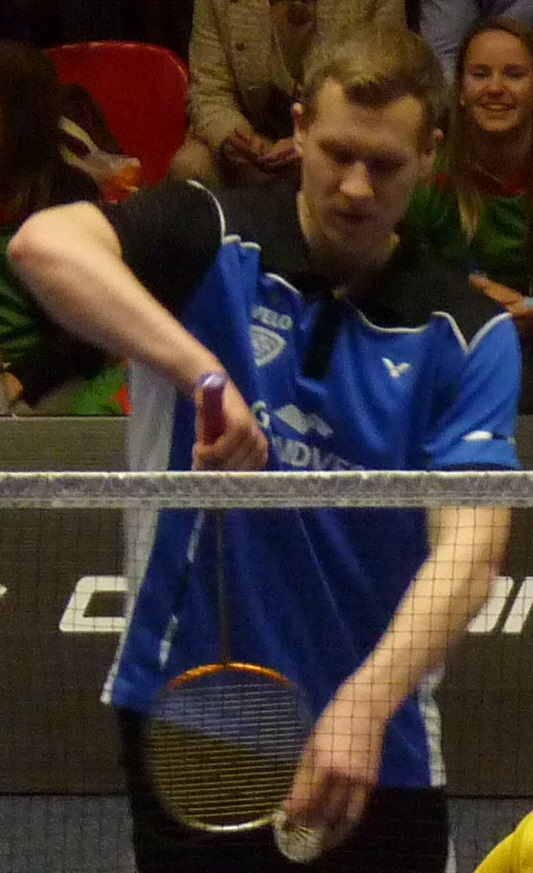

Personal information
- Born: 6 January 1993 (age 33) Delft, Netherlands

Sport
- Country: Netherlands
- Sport: Badminton

Men's singles & doubles
- Highest ranking: 603 (MS 22 April 2010); 145 (MD 21 March 2013); 246 (XD 13 September 2012)
- BWF profile
Medal record
Men's badminton
Representing Netherlands
European Junior Championships
Bronze medal – third place	2011 Vantaa	Mixed doubles

Jim Middelburg (born 6 January 1993) is a Dutch badminton player. Born in Delft, Middelburg had been training in DKC badminton club, then he moved to SV VELO. In 2011, he won bronze medal at the European Junior Badminton Championships in the mixed doubles event with his partner Soraya de Visch Eijbergen.

== Achievements ==
=== European Junior Championships ===
Mixed doubles
Year	Venue	Partner	Opponent	Score	Result
2011	Energia Areena; Vantaa, Finland	(Netherlands) Soraya de Visch Eijbergen	(England) Matthew Nottingham (England) Helena Lewczynska	14–21, 17–21	Bronze

=== BWF International Challenge/Series ===
Men's doubles
Year	Tournament	Partner	Opponent	Score	Result
2012	Hungarian International	(Netherlands) Ruud Bosch	(Croatia) Zvonimir Đurkinjak (Croatia) Zvonimir Hölbling	17–21, 21–19, 21–16	(gold) Winner
2017	Dutch International	(Netherlands) Russell Muns	(New Zealand) Oliver Leydon-Davis (Denmark) Lasse Mølhede	21–18, 10–21, 22–24	(silver) Runner-up

Mixed doubles
Year	Tournament	Partner	Opponent	Score	Result
2017	Dutch International	(Netherlands) Myke Halkema	(Finland) Anton Kaisti (Finland) Jenny Nyström	18–21, 18–21	(silver) Runner-up

BWF International Challenge tournament
BWF International Series tournament
BWF Future Series tournament
