= Max Schwenger =

German badminton player (born 1992)

Personal information
- Born: 28 April 1992 (age 34) Neustadt an der Aisch, Bavaria, Germany

Sport
- Country: Germany
- Sport: Badminton

Men's & mixed doubles
- Highest ranking: 23 (MD 19 March 2015); 17 (XD 26 March 2015)
- BWF profile
Medal record
Men's badminton
Representing Germany
European Mixed Team Championships
Bronze medal – third place	2015 Leuven	Mixed team
European Men's Team Championships
Bronze medal – third place	2014 Basel	Men's team
World Junior Championships
Bronze medal – third place	2010 Guadalajara	Mixed doubles
European Junior Championships
Gold medal – first place	2011 Vantaa	Mixed team
Silver medal – second place	2011 Vantaa	Boys' doubles
Bronze medal – third place	2009 Milan	Mixed team
Bronze medal – third place	2011 Vantaa	Mixed doubles

Max Schwenger (born 28 April 1992) is a German badminton player, specializing in doubles play. In 2011, he won the silver medal in boys' doubles and bronze medal in mixed doubles at the 2011 European Junior Badminton Championships.

== Achievements ==
=== BWF World Junior Championships ===
Mixed doubles
Year	Venue	Partner	Opponent	Score	Result
2010	Domo del Code Jalisco; Guadalajara, Mexico	(Germany) Isabel Herttrich	(China) Liu Cheng (China) Bao Yixin	18–21, 15–21	Bronze

=== European Junior Championships ===
Boys' doubles
Year	Venue	Partner	Opponent	Score	Result
2011	Energia Areena; Vantaa, Finland	(Germany) Fabian Holzer	(England) Chris Coles (England) Matthew Nottingham	21–15, 14–21, 15–21	Silver

Mixed doubles
Year	Venue	Partner	Opponent	Score	Result
2011	Energia Areena; Vantaa, Finland	(Germany) Isabel Herttrich	(Denmark) Kim Astrup (Denmark) Line Kjærsfeldt	23–25, 14–21	Bronze

=== BWF Grand Prix ===
The BWF Grand Prix had two levels, the Grand Prix and Grand Prix Gold. It was a series of badminton tournaments sanctioned by the Badminton World Federation (BWF) and played between 2007 and 2017.

Men's doubles
Year	Tournament	Partner	Opponent	Score	Result
2014	Brasil Open	(Germany) Josche Zurwonne	(Germany) Raphael Beck (Germany) Andreas Heinz	11–9, 11–6, 11–4	(gold) Winner

Mixed doubles
Year	Tournament	Partner	Opponent	Score	Result
2014	Canada Open	(Germany) Carla Nelte	(Netherlands) Jorrit de Ruiter (Netherlands) Samantha Barning	21–16, 25–23	(gold) Winner
2014	Brasil Open	(Germany) Carla Nelte	(Republic of Ireland) Sam Magee (Republic of Ireland) Chloe Magee	10–11, 10–11, 11–10, 11–8, 11–7	(gold) Winner

BWF Grand Prix Gold tournament
BWF Grand Prix tournament

=== BWF International Challenge/Series ===
Men's doubles
Year	Tournament	Partner	Opponent	Score	Result
2012	French International	(Germany) Andreas Heinz	(Germany) Peter Käsbauer (Germany) Josche Zurwonne	24–26, 21–17, 11–21	(silver) Runner-up
2014	Irish open	(Germany) Josche Zurwonne	(Poland) Adam Cwalina (Poland) Przemysław Wacha	21–12, 10–21, 18–21	(silver) Runner-up

Mixed doubles
Year	Tournament	Partner	Opponent	Score	Result
2014	Bulgarian International	(Germany) Carla Nelte	(Indonesia) Fran Kurniawan (Indonesia) Komala Dewi	21–18, 19–21, 13–21	(silver) Runner-up

BWF International Challenge tournament
BWF International Series tournament
BWF Future Series tournament
