= Sandra-Maria Jensen =

Danish badminton player (born 1994)

Personal information
- Born: 5 April 1994 (age 32) Bulgaria

Sport
- Country: Denmark
- Sport: Badminton

Women's singles & doubles
- Highest ranking: 61 (WS 17 April 2014); 51 (WD 26 April 2012)
- BWF profile
Medal record
Women's badminton
Representing Denmark
European Mixed Team Championships
| Gold medal – first place | 2015 Leuven | Mixed team |
European Women's Team Championships
| Gold medal – first place | 2014 Basel | Women's team |
World Junior Championships
| Bronze medal – third place | 2010 Alor Setar | Girls' doubles |
European Junior Championships
| Gold medal – first place | 2013 Ankara | Mixed team |
| Bronze medal – third place | 2011 Vantaa | Girls' doubles |
| Bronze medal – third place | 2011 Vantaa | Mixed team |

Sandra-Maria Jensen (born 5 April 1994) is a Danish badminton player. Born in Bulgaria, Jensen and her family moved to Denmark when she was four. At the age of fifteen, she was selected to join the national U-19 team to compete at the 2009 World Junior Championships as the younger player in the squad. She won the bronze medal at the 2010 World Junior Championships in the girls' doubles event partnered with Line Kjærsfeldt, and at the European Junior Championships, she helped the team win a bronze in 2011 and a gold in 2013, also settled a bronze medal in the girls' doubles event in 2011. Jensen joined the national elite squad that won the European Women's Team Championships in 2014 and the European Mixed Team Championships in 2015.

== Achievements ==
=== BWF World Junior Championships ===
Girls' doubles
| Year | Venue | Partner | Opponent | Score | Result |
|---|---|---|---|---|---|
| 2010 | Domo del Code Jalisco; Guadalajara, Mexico | (Denmark) Line Kjærsfeldt | (China) Bao Yixin (China) Ou Dongni | 15–21, 7–21 | Bronze |

=== European Junior Championships ===
Girls' doubles
| Year | Venue | Partner | Opponent | Score | Result |
|---|---|---|---|---|---|
| 2011 | Energia Areena; Vantaa, Finland | (Denmark) Line Kjærsfeldt | (Netherlands) Thamar Peters (Netherlands) Josephine Wentholt | 21–16, 15–21, 19–21 | Bronze |

=== BWF International Challenge/Series ===
Women's singles
| Year | Tournament | Opponent | Score | Result |
|---|---|---|---|---|
| 2012 | Denmark International | (Denmark) Anna Thea Madsen | 21–19, 21–18 | (gold) Winner |
| 2013 | Croatian International | (Russia) Natalia Perminova | 14–21, 15–21 | (silver) Runner-up |
| 2014 | Portugal International | (Denmark) Anna Thea Madsen | 17–21, 23–21, 21–12 | (gold) Winner |
| 2014 | Hungarian International | (England) Fontaine Chapman | 2–11, 10–11, 9–11 | (silver) Runner-up |

Women's doubles
| Year | Tournament | Partner | Opponent | Score | Result |
|---|---|---|---|---|---|
| 2011 | Croatian International | (Denmark) Line Kjærsfeldt | (Poland) Natalia Pocztowiak (Croatia) Staša Poznanović | 21–14, 21–18 | (gold) Winner |
| 2012 | Banuinvest International | (Denmark) Line Kjærsfeldt | (Bulgaria) Gabriela Stoeva (Bulgaria) Stefani Stoeva | 21–19, 17–21, 21–16 | (gold) Winner |

BWF International Challenge tournament
BWF International Series tournament
BWF Future Series tournament
