= Soraya de Visch Eijbergen =

Dutch badminton player (born 1993)

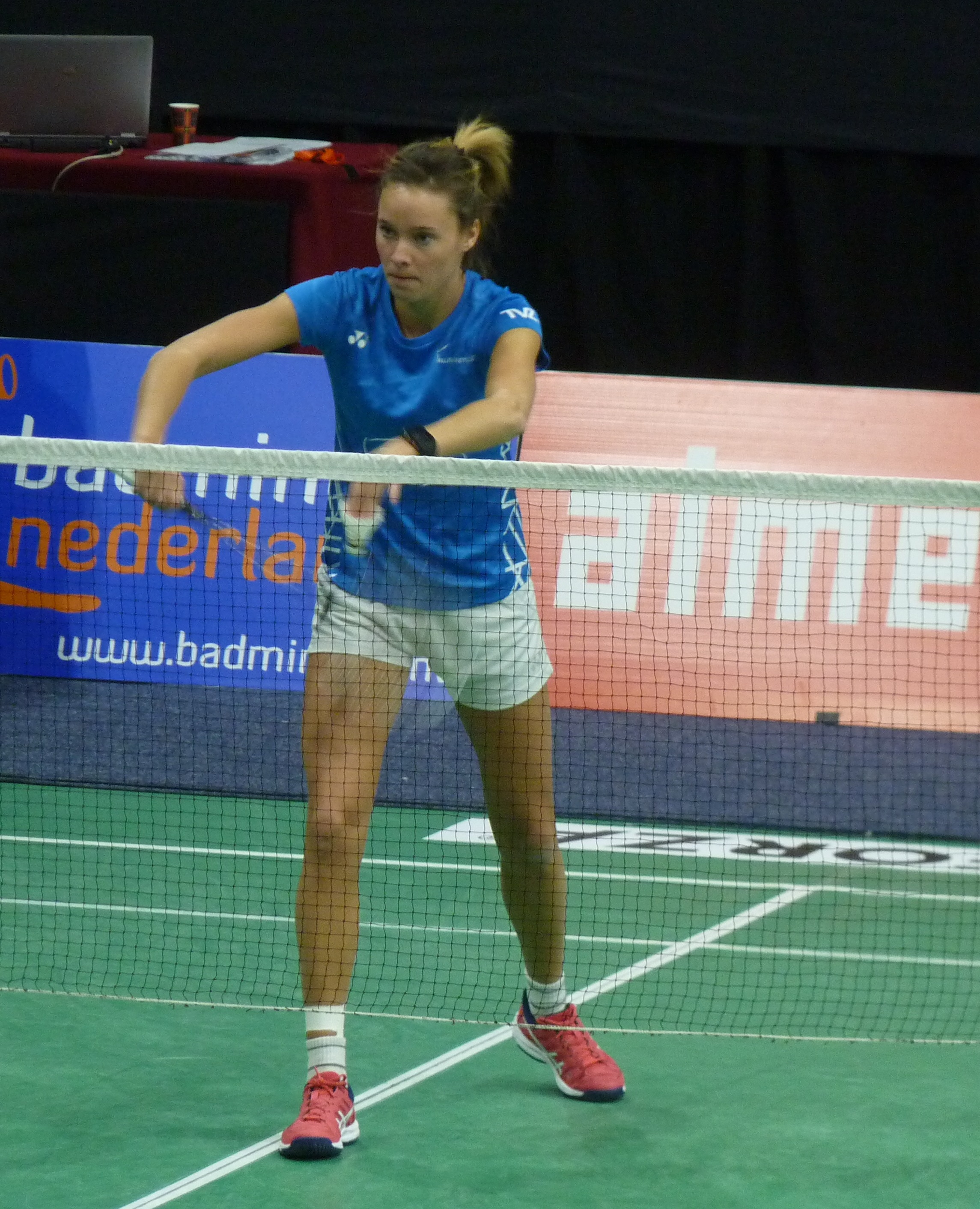

Personal information
- Born: 6 January 1993 (age 33) Papendrecht, Netherlands
- Height: 1.70 m (5 ft 7 in)
- Weight: 53 kg (117 lb)

Sport
- Country: Netherlands
- Sport: Badminton
- Handedness: Right
- Coached by: Ruud Bosch

Women's singles
- Highest ranking: 56 (WS 26 November 2015); 118 (WD with Alida Chen 23 January 2014); 246 (XD with Jim Middelburg 13 September 2012)
- BWF profile
Medal record
Women's badminton
Representing Netherlands
European Mixed Team Championships
Bronze medal – third place	2019 Copenhagen	Mixed team
European Women's Team Championships
Bronze medal – third place	2012 Amsterdam	Women's team
European Junior Championships
Silver medal – second place	2009 Milan	Mixed team
Bronze medal – third place	2011 Vantaa	Mixed doubles

Soraya de Visch Eijbergen (born 6 January 1993) is a Dutch badminton player. She won the Dutch National Badminton Championships in 2015, 2016, 2019 and 2020. She won a bronze medal at the 2011 European Junior Badminton Championships in the mixed doubles event. On 25 September 2018, she announced her departure from the Dutch national team and emigration to Switzerland in pursuit of further badminton ambitions. Currently, she plays inter-club competition in France for Badminton Club Chambly Oise. She competed at the 2019 Minsk European Games.

== Achievements ==
=== European Junior Championships ===
Mixed doubles
Year	Venue	Partner	Opponent	Score	Result
2011	Energia Areena; Vantaa, Finland	(Netherlands) Jim Middelburg	(England) Matthew Nottingham (England) Helena Lewczynska	14–21, 17–21	Bronze

=== BWF International Challenge/Series ===
Women's singles
Year	Tournament	Opponent	Score	Result
2013	Hungarian International	(Russia) Olga Golovanova	15–21, 21–18, 15–21	(silver) Runner-up
2014	Dutch International	(Germany) Fabienne Deprez	21–15, 21–8	(gold) Winner
2014	Slovenia International	(Bulgaria) Stefani Stoeva	18–21, 14–21	(silver) Runner-up
2015	Orleans International	(Denmark) Natalia Koch Rohde	15–21, 7–11 retired	(silver) Runner-up
2015	Dutch International	(Belgium) Lianne Tan	17–21, 18–21	(silver) Runner-up
2017	Irish Open	(Denmark) Anna Thea Madsen	13–21, 13–21	(silver) Runner-up

Women's doubles
Year	Tournament	Partner	Opponent	Score	Result
2013	Slovenia International	(Netherlands) Alida Chen	(Ukraine) Natalya Voytsekh (Ukraine) Yelyzaveta Zharka	11–21, 21–14, 21–14	(gold) Winner
2013	Hellas International	(Netherlands) Alida Chen	(Turkey) Cemre Fere (Turkey) Neslihan Kılıç	Walkover	(silver) Runner-up

BWF International Challenge tournament
BWF International Series tournament
BWF Future Series tournament
