= 2011 European Junior Badminton Championships =

Tournament details
- Dates: 15 – 24 April 2011
- Venue: Vantaan Energia Arena
- Location: Vantaa, Uusimaa, Finland

The 2011 European Junior Badminton Championships were held at the Vantaan Energia Arena in Vantaa, Finland, between 15-24 April 2011.

== Medalists ==
Below were the medalists in the 2011 European Junior Championships:

| Event | Gold | Silver | Bronze |
|---|---|---|---|
| Men's singles | (Denmark) Viktor Axelsen | (Denmark) Rasmus Fladberg | (Finland) Kasper Lehikoinen |
| Men's singles | (Denmark) Viktor Axelsen | (Denmark) Rasmus Fladberg | (Turkey) Emre Lale |
| Women's singles | (Spain) Carolina Marín | (Spain) Beatriz Corrales | (Germany) Fabienne Deprez |
| Women's singles | (Spain) Carolina Marín | (Spain) Beatriz Corrales | (Turkey) Özge Bayrak |
| Men's doubles | (England) Chris Coles (England) Matthew Nottingham | (Germany) Fabian Holzer (Germany) Max Schwenger | (Denmark) Kim Astrup (Denmark) Rasmus Fladberg |
| Men's doubles | (England) Chris Coles (England) Matthew Nottingham | (Germany) Fabian Holzer (Germany) Max Schwenger | (France) Lucas Corvée (France) Joris Grosjean |
| Women's doubles | (Denmark) Mette Poulsen (Denmark) Ditte Strunge Larsen | (Netherlands) Thamar Peters (Netherlands) Josephine Wentholt | (Denmark) Sandra-Maria Jensen (Denmark) Line Kjærsfeldt |
| Women's doubles | (Denmark) Mette Poulsen (Denmark) Ditte Strunge Larsen | (Netherlands) Thamar Peters (Netherlands) Josephine Wentholt | (Germany) Isabel Herttrich (Germany) Inken Wienefeld |
| Mixed doubles | (Denmark) Kim Astrup (Denmark) Line Kjærsfeldt | (England) Matthew Nottingham (England) Helena Lewczynska | (Germany) Max Schwenger (Germany) Isabel Herttrich |
| Mixed doubles | (Denmark) Kim Astrup (Denmark) Line Kjærsfeldt | (England) Matthew Nottingham (England) Helena Lewczynska | (Netherlands) Jim Middelburg (Netherlands) Soraya de Visch Eijbergen |
| Teams | Germany; Raphael Beck; Dominic Becker; Mark Philipp Byerly; Fabian Holzer; Peter Lang; Thomas Legleitner; Kai Schäfer; Fabian Scherpen; Max Schwenger; Lena Bonnie; Fabienne Deprez; Anika Dörr; Ramona Hacks; Alina Hammes; Isabel Herttrich; Jennifer Karnott; Kira Kattenbeck; Laura Wich; Inken Wienefeld | Russia; Konstantin Abramov; Dmitry Balandin; Denis Grachev; Sergey Sirant; Alexandr Sorokin; Anatoly Yartsev; Alina Artamonova; Ekaterina Bolotova; Anastasiia Akchurina; Romina Gabdullina; Maria Korobeynikova; Evgeniya Kosetskaya | Denmark; Kim Astrup; Viktor Axelsen; Morten Brødbæk; Kim Bruun; Frederik Colberg; Rasmus Fladberg; Rasmus Grill Noes; Mikkel Mikkelsen; Nikolaj Overgaard; Flemming Quach; Lene Clausen; Julie Finne-Ipsen; Sandra-Maria Jensen; Celine Juel; Line Kjærsfeldt; Sara Ortvang; Mette Poulsen; Rikke Søby Hansen; Ditte Strunge Larsen; Anna Thea Madsen |
| Teams | Germany; Raphael Beck; Dominic Becker; Mark Philipp Byerly; Fabian Holzer; Peter Lang; Thomas Legleitner; Kai Schäfer; Fabian Scherpen; Max Schwenger; Lena Bonnie; Fabienne Deprez; Anika Dörr; Ramona Hacks; Alina Hammes; Isabel Herttrich; Jennifer Karnott; Kira Kattenbeck; Laura Wich; Inken Wienefeld | Russia; Konstantin Abramov; Dmitry Balandin; Denis Grachev; Sergey Sirant; Alexandr Sorokin; Anatoly Yartsev; Alina Artamonova; Ekaterina Bolotova; Anastasiia Akchurina; Romina Gabdullina; Maria Korobeynikova; Evgeniya Kosetskaya | Ukraine; Sergiy Garist; Kyrylo Leonov; Gennadiy Natarov; Artem Pochtarov; Andriy Zinukhov; Viktoriya Gushcha; Yuliya Kazarinova; Mariya Rud; Natalya Voytsekh; Yelyzaveta Zharka |

== Medal table ==
* Host nation (Finland)

| Rank | Nation | Gold | Silver | Bronze | Total |
|---|---|---|---|---|---|
| 1 | Denmark | 3 | 1 | 3 | 7 |
| 2 | Germany | 1 | 1 | 3 | 5 |
| 3 | England | 1 | 1 | 0 | 2 |
| 3 | Spain | 1 | 1 | 0 | 2 |
| 5 | Netherlands | 0 | 1 | 1 | 2 |
| 6 | Russia | 0 | 1 | 0 | 1 |
| 7 | Turkey | 0 | 0 | 2 | 2 |
| 8 | Finland* | 0 | 0 | 1 | 1 |
| 8 | France | 0 | 0 | 1 | 1 |
| 8 | Ukraine | 0 | 0 | 1 | 1 |
| Totals (10 entries) | | 6 | 6 | 12 | 24 |
