= Fabienne Deprez =

German badminton player (born 1992)

Personal information
- Born: 8 February 1992 (age 34) Langenfeld, Rhineland, Germany
- Years active: 2007
- Height: 1.71 m (5 ft 7 in)
- Weight: 60 kg (132 lb)

Sport
- Country: Germany
- Sport: Badminton
- Handedness: Left

Women's singles & mixed doubles
- Highest ranking: 45 (WS, 15 June 2017); 120 (XD, 15 September 2011)
- BWF profile
Medal record
Women's badminton
Representing Germany
European Mixed Team Championships
Silver medal – second place	2019 Copenhagen	Mixed team
Bronze medal – third place	2015 Leuven	Mixed team
Bronze medal – third place	2017 Lubin	Mixed team
European Women's Team Championships
Gold medal – first place	2012 Amsterdam	Women's team
Silver medal – second place	2018 Kazan	Women's team
Silver medal – second place	2020 Liévin	Women's team
Bronze medal – third place	2010 Warsaw	Women's team
Bronze medal – third place	2014 Basel	Women's team
Bronze medal – third place	2016 Kazan	Women's team
European Junior Championships
Gold medal – first place	2011 Vantaa	Mixed team
Silver medal – second place	2009 Milan	Mixed doubles
Bronze medal – third place	2009 Milan	Mixed team
Bronze medal – third place	2011 Vantaa	Girls' singles

Fabienne Deprez (born 8 February 1992) is a German badminton player. She won the gold medal at the European Junior Championships in the team event in 2011, a silver in the mixed doubles in 2009, also two bronzes in the team and girls' singles in 2009 and 2011 respectively. Deprez was part of the national team that won the 2012 European Women's Team Championships. She played for the FC Langenfeld, and emerge as the women's singles champion at the 2013 German National Championships.

== Achievements ==
=== European Junior Championships ===
Girls' singles
Year	Venue	Opponent	Score	Result
2011	Energia Areena, Vantaa, Finland	(Spain) Beatriz Corrales	17–21, 11–21	Bronze

Mixed doubles
Year	Venue	Partner	Opponent	Score	Result
2009	Federal Technical Centre - Palabadminton; Milan, Italy	(Germany) Jonas Geigenberger	(Netherlands) Jacco Arends (Netherlands) Selena Piek	16–21, 22–20, 19–21	Silver

=== BWF International Challenge/Series (1 title, 3 runners-up) ===
Women's singles
Year	Tournament	Opponent	Score	Result
2014	Dutch International	(Netherlands) Soraya de Visch Eijbergen	15–21, 8–21	(silver) Runner-up
2016	Hellas Open	(Germany) Luise Heim	16–4 retired	(gold) Winner
2017	Austrian Open	(Scotland) Kirsty Gilmour	17–21, 9–21	(silver) Runner-up
2019	Welsh International	(Spain) Clara Azurmendi	14–21, 16–21	(silver) Runner-up

BWF International Challenge tournament
BWF International Series tournament
BWF Future Series tournament
