= 2010 BWF World Junior Championships =

Tournament details
- Dates: April 16, 2010 - April 25, 2010
- Edition: 12th
- Level: International
- Venue: CODE Dome
- Location: Guadalajara, Mexico

The 2010 BWF World Junior Championships were held in Guadalajara, Mexico from April 16 to 25, 2010.

== Medalists ==
Event	Gold	Silver	Bronze
Teams	China; Cai Ruiqing; Chen Zhuofu; He Liu; Huang Yuxiang; Li Gen; Liu Cheng; Liu Kai; Song Ziwei; Bao Yixin; Deng Xuan; Jiang Yujing; Ou Dongni; Suo Di; Tang Jinhua; Wang Liang; Xia Huan	South Korea; Choi Seung-il; Ha Young-woong; Jun Bong-chan; Jung Ki-hwa; Kang Ji-wook; Kim Min-ki; Lee Hong-je; Park Dae-woong; Choi Hye-in; Kang Ga-hee; Kim Chan-mi; Lee So-hee; Park Ko-woon; Park So-young; Shin Seung-chan; Yang Ran-sun	Malaysia; Nur Mohd Azriyn Ayub; Nelson Heg Wei Keat; Loh Wei Sheng; Ow Yao Han; Teo Ee Yi; Tew Gee Chong; Yew Hong Kheng; Zulfadli Zulkiffli; Sonia Cheah Su Ya; Lai Pei Jing; Shevon Jemie Lai; Yang Li Lian
Boys singles	(Denmark) Viktor Axelsen	(South Korea) Kang Ji-Wook	(India) Sai Praneeth
Boys singles	(Denmark) Viktor Axelsen	(South Korea) Kang Ji-Wook	(India) Prannoy Kumar
Girls singles	(Thailand) Ratchanok Inthanon	(Japan) Misaki Matsutomo	(Japan) Naoko Fukuman
Girls singles	(Thailand) Ratchanok Inthanon	(Japan) Misaki Matsutomo	(China) Suo Di
Boys doubles	(Malaysia) Ow Yao Han (Malaysia) Yew Hong Kheng	(Malaysia) Nelson Heg Wei Keat (Malaysia) Teo Ee Yi	(Hong Kong) Lee Chun Hei (Hong Kong) Ng Ka Long
Boys doubles	(Malaysia) Ow Yao Han (Malaysia) Yew Hong Kheng	(Malaysia) Nelson Heg Wei Keat (Malaysia) Teo Ee Yi	(Denmark) Kim Astrup (Denmark) Rasmus Fladberg
Girls doubles	(China) Bao Yixin (China) Ou Dongni	(China) Tang Jinhua (China) Xia Huan	(South Korea) Choi Hye-In (South Korea) Lee So-hee
Girls doubles	(China) Bao Yixin (China) Ou Dongni	(China) Tang Jinhua (China) Xia Huan	(Denmark) Sandra-Maria Jensen (Denmark) Line Kjaersfeldt
Mixed doubles	(China) Liu Cheng (China) Bao Yixin	(South Korea) Kang Ji-Wook (South Korea) Choi Hye-In	(Germany) Max Schwenger (Germany) Isabel Herttrich
Mixed doubles	(China) Liu Cheng (China) Bao Yixin	(South Korea) Kang Ji-Wook (South Korea) Choi Hye-In	(Malaysia) Ow Yao Han (Malaysia) Lai Pei Jing

== Team competition ==
A total of 24 countries competed at the team competition in 2010 BWF World Junior Championships.

=== Final positions ===
1. China
2. South Korea
3. Malaysia
4. Indonesia
5. Japan
6. Denmark
7. Chinese Taipei
8. Thailand
9. India
10. England
11. Hong Kong
12. Germany
13. France
14. Netherlands
15. Singapore
16. Canada
17. Turkey
18. Peru
19. Austria (Debut)
20. United States
21. Mexico (Debut)
22. Puerto Rico
23. South Africa
24. Dominican Republic (Debut)

=== Final round ===
China
3
Guadalajara, Mexico
April 19, 2010

South Korea
0

			1	2	3
1	(China) (South Korea)	Liu Cheng / Bao Yixin; Kang Ji-wook / Choi Hye-in	15; 21	21; 17	21; 19
2	(China) (South Korea)	Huang Yuxiang; Lee Hong-je	17; 21	21; 16	21; 14
3	(China) (South Korea)	Suo Di; Park Ko-woon	21; 15	21; 13
4	(China) (South Korea)	Li Gen / Chen Zhuofu; Kang Ji-wook / Choi Seung-il				not played
5	(China) (South Korea)	Tang Jinhua / Xia Huan; Choi Hye-In / Lee So-hee				not played

== Medal table ==
Rank	Nation	Gold	Silver	Bronze	Total
1	China	3	1	1	5
2	Malaysia	1	1	2	4
3	Denmark	1	0	2	3
4	Thailand	1	0	0	1
5	South Korea	0	3	1	4
6	Japan	0	1	1	2
7	India	0	0	2	2
8	Germany	0	0	1	1
8	Hong Kong	0	0	1	1
Totals (9 entries)		6	6	11	23
