= Choi Hye-in =

South Korean badminton player

Personal information
- Born: 8 August 1992 (age 34)
- Height: 1.67 m (5 ft 6 in)

Sport
- Country: South Korea
- Sport: Badminton

Women's & mixed doubles
- Highest ranking: 14 (WD 7 August 2013); 41 (XD with Kim Sa-rang 28 February 2013)
- BWF profile
Medal record
Women's badminton
Representing South Korea
Asian Championships
Bronze medal – third place	2012 Qingdao	Mixed doubles
World Junior Championships
Silver medal – second place	2007 Waitakere City	Mixed team
Silver medal – second place	2008 Pune	Mixed team
Silver medal – second place	2010 Guadalajara	Mixed doubles
Silver medal – second place	2010 Guadalajara	Mixed team
Bronze medal – third place	2010 Guadalajara	Girls' doubles

- Choi Hye-in
- Hangul: 최혜인
- Hanja: 崔惠仁
- RR: Choe Hyein
- MR: Ch'oe Hyein

Choi Hye-in (Korean: 최혜인; born 8 August 1992) is a Korean badminton player who affiliated Daekyo badminton team since 2011, and later representing Incheon International Airport.

== Career ==
Choi who educated at the Beomseo High School in Ulsan, was one of Korea's top junior players. She clinched three titles at the 2010 German Junior Open, winning the girls' singles, girls' doubles, and mixed doubles events. The same year, she was runner-up in mixed doubles at the 2010 World Junior Championships. She also represented Korea in the badminton at the Youth Olympic Games in Singapore.

As a senior, she focused exclusively on doubles and played with various partners, reaching the 2012 Macau Open final with Kim So-yeong and the final of the 2013 Korea Grand Prix Gold with Kang Ji-wook. Her first major senior title came in 2014, when she and Lee So-hee won the women's doubles title at the 2014 Canada Open. Choi tried out, but was not selected for the national team in December 2014.

== Achievements ==
=== Asian Championships ===
Mixed doubles
Year	Venue	Partner	Opponent	Score	Result
2012	Qingdao Sports Centre Conson Stadium; Qingdao, China	(South Korea) Kim Sa-rang	(China) Zhang Nan (China) Zhao Yunlei	13–21, 21–12, 13–21	Bronze

=== BWF World Junior Championships ===
Girls' doubles
Year	Venue	Partner	Opponent	Score	Result
2010	Domo del Code Jalisco; Guadalajara, Mexico	(South Korea) Lee So-hee	(China) Tang Jinhua (China) Xia Huan	22–20, 13–21, 15–21	Bronze

Mixed doubles
Year	Venue	Partner	Opponent	Score	Result
2010	Domo del Code Jalisco; Guadalajara, Mexico	(South Korea) Kang Ji-Wook	(China) Liu Cheng (China) Bao Yixin	15–21, 15–21	Silver

=== BWF Grand Prix ===
The BWF Grand Prix had two levels, the Grand Prix and Grand Prix Gold. It was a series of badminton tournaments sanctioned by the Badminton World Federation (BWF) and played between 2007 and 2017.

Women's doubles
Year	Tournament	Partner	Opponent	Score	Result
2012	Macau Open	(South Korea) Kim So-young	(South Korea) Eom Hye-won (South Korea) Jang Ye-na	18–21, 16–21	(silver) Runner-up
2014	Canada Open	(South Korea) Lee So-hee	(South Korea) Park So-young (South Korea) Park Sun-young	21–15, 21–18	(gold) Winner

Mixed doubles
Year	Tournament	Partner	Opponent	Score	Result
2013	Korea Grand Prix Gold	(South Korea) Kang Ji-wook	(South Korea) Yoo Yeon-seong (South Korea) Jang Ye-na	13–21, 11–21	(silver) Runner-up

BWF Grand Prix Gold tournament
BWF Grand Prix tournament

=== BWF International Challenge/Series ===
Women's doubles
Year	Tournament	Partner	Opponent	Score	Result
2011	Vietnam International	(South Korea) Lee Se-rang	(Indonesia) Komala Dewi (Indonesia) Jenna Gozali	15–21, 21–10, 21–13	(gold) Winner

Mixed doubles
Year	Tournament	Partner	Opponent	Score	Result
2011	Vietnam International	(South Korea) Kang Ji-wook	(Thailand) Patiphat Chalardchaleam (Thailand) Savitree Amitrapai	19–21, 22–20, 21–23	(silver) Runner-up

BWF International Challenge tournament
BWF International Series tournament
