= Alexandra Langley =

English badminton player (born 1991)

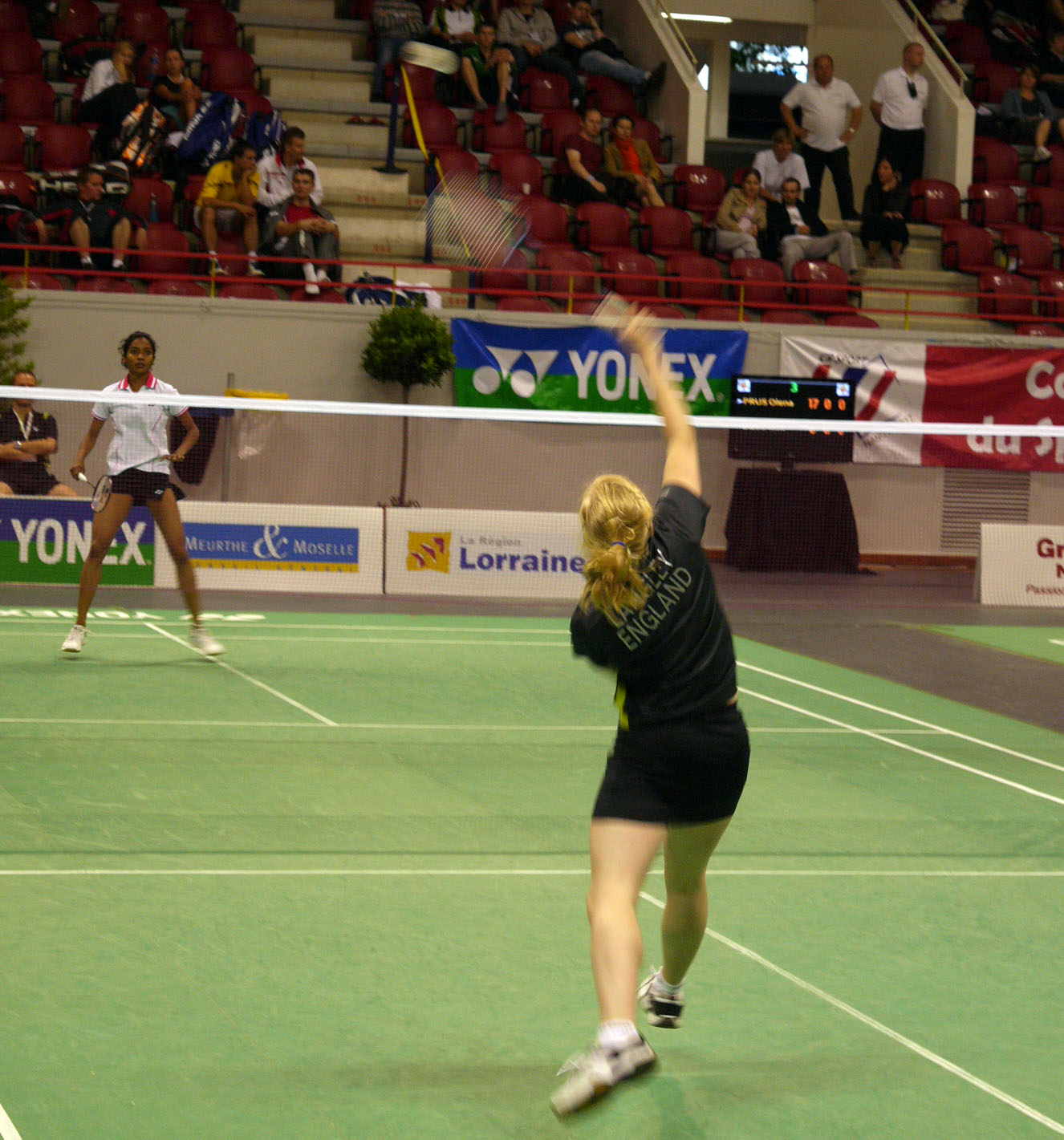

Personal information
- Nickname: Alex
- Born: 19 June 1991 (age 35) Grimsby, England
- Height: 5 ft 3 in (160 cm)

Sport
- Country: England
- Sport: Badminton
- Handedness: Right

Women's
- Highest ranking: 236 (WS) 22 Oct 2009; 42 (WD) 5 Apr 2012; 77 (XD) 27 Sep 2012
- BWF profile

Alexandra Langley (born 14 July 1992) is a badminton player from England. In 2011, she took the women's and mixed doubles titles at the Portugal International tournament.

== Achievements ==
=== BWF International Challenge/Series (4 titles, 3 runners-up) ===
Women's doubles

| Year | Tournament | Opponent | Partner | Score | Result |
|---|---|---|---|---|---|
| 2012 | Spanish International | (England) Mariana Agathangelou | (Russia) Anastasia Chervyakova (Russia) Tatjana Bibik | 21-12, 16–21, 18–21 | (silver) Runner-up |
| 2012 | Portugal International | (England) Gabrielle White | (England) Helena Lewczynska (England) Hayley Rogers | 21-11, 21–19 | (gold) Winner |
| 2011 | Turkey Open | (England) Lauren Smith | (Bulgaria) Gabriela Stoeva (Bulgaria) Stefani Stoeva | 14-21, 21–16, 10–21 | (silver) Runner-up |
| 2011 | Welsh International | (England) Lauren Smith | (Malaysia) Ng Hui Lin (Malaysia) Ng Hui Ern | 16-21, 14–21 | (silver) Runner-up |
| 2011 | Portugal International | (England) Lauren Smith | (England) Helen Davies (England) Alyssa Lim | 14-21, 21–14, 21–17 | (gold) Winner |
| 2010 | Portugal International | (England) Lauren Smith | (Belgium) Steffi Annys (Belgium) Severine Corvilain | 13-21, 21–13, 21–18 | (gold) Winner |

Mixed doubles

| Year | Tournament | Opponent | Partner | Score | Result |
|---|---|---|---|---|---|
| 2011 | Portugal International | (England) Robin Middleton | (England) Ben Stawski (England) Lauren Smith | 25-23, 21–19 | (gold) Winner |

Commonwealth Youth Games tournament
BWF International Series tournament
BWF Future Series tournament
