= Natalia Koch Rohde =

Danish badminton player (born 1995)

Personal information
- Born: 1 August 1995 (age 31) Gentofte Municipality, Denmark
- Years active: 2010–2018
- Height: 1.80 m (5 ft 11 in)

Sport
- Country: Denmark
- Sport: Badminton
- Handedness: Right

Women's singles
- Highest ranking: 35 (15 June 2017)
- BWF profile
Medal record
Women's badminton
Representing Denmark
European Mixed Team Championships
Gold medal – first place	2015 Leuven	Mixed team
Gold medal – first place	2017 Lubin	Mixed team
Silver medal – second place	2013 Moscow	Mixed team
European Women's Team Championships
Gold medal – first place	2016 Kazan	Women's team
Gold medal – first place	2018 Kazan	Women's team
European Junior Championships
Gold medal – first place	2013 Ankara	Mixed team

Natalia Koch Rohde (born 1 August 1995) is a Danish badminton player.

== Achievements ==
=== BWF International Challenge/Series ===
Women's singles

Year	Tournament	Opponent	Score	Result
2015	Orléans International	(Netherlands) Soraya de Visch Eijbergen	21–15, 11–7 retired	(gold) Winner
2015	Eurasia Bulgaria International	(Germany) Yvonne Li	21–15, 21–19	(gold) Winner
2015	Irish Open	(Germany) Olga Konon	17–21, 16–21	(silver) Runner-up
2015	Italian International	(Germany) Olga Konon	21–18, 16–21, 21–15	(gold) Winner
2016	Czech International	(Denmark) Mette Poulsen	21–10, 21–15	(gold) Winner

BWF International Challenge tournament
BWF International Series tournament
BWF Future Series tournament

== Personal life ==
She was in a relationship with Viktor Axelsen.

Natalia Koch Rohde gave birth to a first baby girl named Vega Rohde Axelsen on 15 October 2020. On 7 October 2022 she gave birth to her second baby girl named Aya Rohde Axelsen. Her father Henrik Rohde, who was headcoach of the winning Skovshoved team in the Danish league in 2017, is also helping with the coaching of her husband Axelsen.

In August 2021, her husband decided to leave the Danish national team in Copenhagen and move with the whole family from Denmark to live in Dubai. There he could train at the NAS Sports Complex (Nad Al Sheba Sports Complex).

On 20 August 2025, Axelsen announced on his social media that he and Rohde had decided to part ways on good terms.
