= Chen Zhuofu =

Chinese badminton player (born 1994)

Chen Zhuofu 谌卓夫
Personal information
- Born: 21 October 1994 (age 32) Changsha, Hunan, China
- Height: 1.80 m (5 ft 11 in)

Sport
- Country: China
- Sport: Badminton

Men's & mixed doubles
- Highest ranking: 97 (MD 15 January 2015); 150 (XD 8 May 2014)
- BWF profile
Medal record
Men's badminton
Representing China
Asian Championships
Bronze medal – third place	2014 Gimcheon	Men's doubles
World Junior Championships
Gold medal – first place	2010 Guadalajara	Mixed team
Asian Junior Championships
Gold medal – first place	2011 Lucknow	Mixed team
Gold medal – first place	2010 Kuala Lumpur	Mixed team
Bronze medal – third place	2011 Lucknow	Mixed doubles

Chen Zhuofu (Chinese: 谌卓夫; pinyin: Chén Zhuōfū; born 21 October 1994) is a Chinese badminton player from Changsha, Hunan. He was part of the Chinese junior team that won the mixed team gold medals at the 2010, 2011 Asian Junior Championships and 2010 World Junior Championships. In the individuals junior event, he clinched the 2011 Asian mixed doubles bronze medal partnered with Xiong Rui. Chen represented Changsha competed at the 2011 National Intercity Games, and won the mixed doubles title partnered with Bao Yixin. Teamed-up with Shi Longfei in the men's doubles, they finished as the semi-finalist and settled for the bronze medal at the 2014 Asian Championships, defeated by their teammates Li Junhui and Liu Yuchen with the score 9–21, 14–21.

== Achievements ==
=== Asian Championships ===
Men's doubles
Year	Venue	Partner	Opponent	Score	Result
2014	Gimcheon Indoor Stadium; Gimcheon, South Korea	(China) Shi Longfei	(China) Li Junhui (China) Liu Yuchen	9–21, 14–21	Bronze

=== Asian Junior Championships ===
Mixed doubles
Year	Venue	Partner	Opponent	Score	Result
2011	Babu Banarasi Das Indoor Stadium; Lucknow, India	(China) Xiong Rui	(Indonesia) Lukhi Apri Nugroho (Indonesia) Ririn Amelia	15–21, 21–18, 14–21	Bronze
