= Johanna Goliszewski =

German badminton player

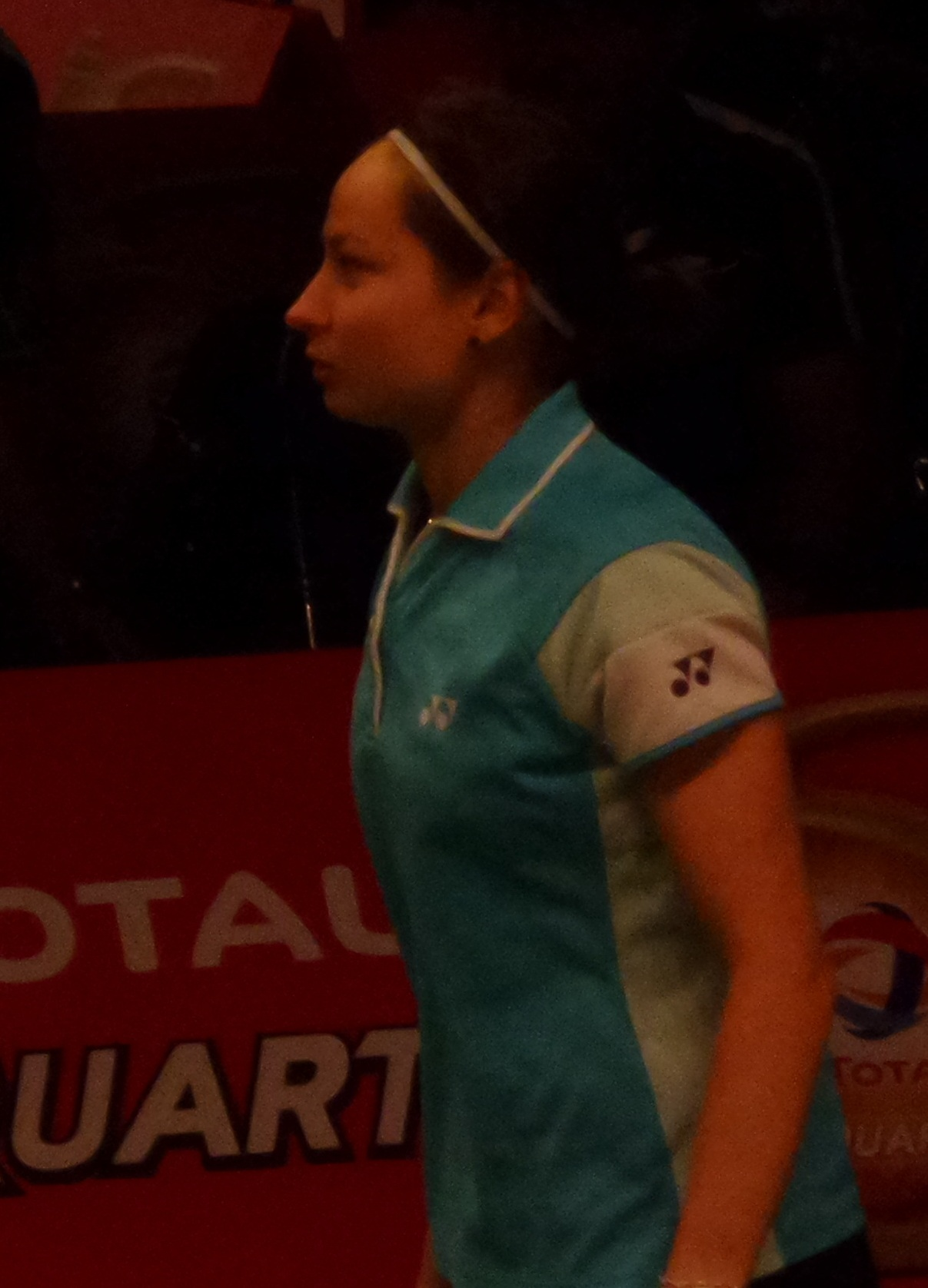
- Goliszewski at the 2015 World Championships

Personal information
- Born: 9 May 1986 (age 40) Olsztyn, Poland
- Height: 1.71 m (5 ft 7 in)
- Weight: 64 kg (141 lb)

Sport
- Country: Germany
- Sport: Badminton
- Handedness: Right

Women's & mixed doubles
- Highest ranking: 17 (WD 18 June 2015); 43 (XD 4 October 2012)
- BWF profile
Medal record
Women's Badminton
Representing Germany
European Mixed Team Championships
Gold medal – first place	2013 Moscow	Mixed team
Silver medal – second place	2011 Amsterdam	Mixed team
Silver medal – second place	2019 Copenhagen	Mixed team
Bronze medal – third place	2015 Leuven	Mixed team
Bronze medal – third place	2017 Lubin	Mixed team
European Women's Team Championships
Gold medal – first place	2012 Amsterdam	Women's team
Silver medal – second place	2018 Kazan	Women's team
Bronze medal – third place	2010 Warsaw	Women's team
Bronze medal – third place	2014 Basel	Women's team
Bronze medal – third place	2016 Kazan	Women's team

Johanna Goliszewski (born 9 May 1986) is a German badminton player who has worked as a sport soldier in the Bundeswehr. She became the member of the Germany national badminton team in 2003. Teamed-up with Carla Nelte in the women's doubles, she competed at the 2016 Summer Olympics held in Rio de Janeiro, Brazil.

== Achievements ==
=== BWF Grand Prix ===
The BWF Grand Prix had two levels, the Grand Prix and Grand Prix Gold. It was a series of badminton tournaments sanctioned by the Badminton World Federation (BWF) and played between 2007 and 2017.

Women's doubles
Year	Tournament	Partner	Opponent	Score	Result
2012	Bitburger Open	(Germany) Birgit Michels	(Macau) Wang Rong (Macau) Zhang Zhibo	15–21, 13–21	(silver) Runner-up
2014	Brasil Open	(Germany) Carla Nelte	(Bulgaria) Gabriela Stoeva (Bulgaria) Stefani Stoeva	11–5, 11–7, 4–11, 11–10	(gold) Winner
2015	Russian Open	(Germany) Carla Nelte	(Bulgaria) Gabriela Stoeva (Bulgaria) Stefani Stoeva	15–21, 17–21	(silver) Runner-up

BWF Grand Prix Gold tournament
BWF Grand Prix tournament

=== BWF International Challenge/Series ===
Women's doubles
Year	Tournament	Partner	Opponent	Score	Result
2009	Slovenian International	(Germany) Claudia Vogelgsang	(Denmark) Lotte Bonde (Denmark) Louise Hansen	21–18, 21–15	(gold) Winner
2010	Hungarian International	(Germany) Carla Nelte	(Germany) Kim Buss (Germany) Claudia Vogelgsang	21–14, 22–20	(gold) Winner
2011	Slovenian International	(Germany) Carla Nelte	(Finland) Airi Mikkelä (Finland) Jenny Nyström	21–14, 21–18	(gold) Winner
2012	Croatian International	(Germany) Carla Nelte	(Netherlands) Samantha Barning (Netherlands) Eefje Muskens	18–21, 19–21	(silver) Runner-up
2012	French International	(Netherlands) Judith Meulendijks	(Denmark) Louise Hansen (Denmark) Tinne Kruse	21–13, 21–12	(gold) Winner
2012	Belgian International	(Netherlands) Judith Meulendijks	(Netherlands) Selena Piek (Netherlands) Iris Tabeling	22–24, 18–21	(silver) Runner-up
2015	Guatemala International	(Germany) Carla Nelte	(United States) Eva Lee (United States) Paula Lynn Obañana	21–18, 24–22	(gold) Winner
2016	Peru International	(Germany) Carla Nelte	(England) Heather Olver (England) Lauren Smith	21–18, 19–21, 21–19	(gold) Winner
2017	Kharkiv International	(Germany) Lara Käpplein	(Ukraine) Marija Ulitina (Ukraine) Natalya Voytsekh	21–15, 21–14	(gold) Winner

Mixed doubles
Year	Tournament	Partner	Opponent	Score	Result
2009	Hungarian International	(Germany) Peter Käsbauer	(Poland) Wojciech Szkudlarczyk (Poland) Agnieszka Wojtkowska	15–21, 21–8, 10–21	(silver) Runner-up
2010	Spanish International	(Germany) Peter Käsbauer	(Republic of Ireland) Sam Magee (Republic of Ireland) Chloe Magee	11–21, 9–21	(silver) Runner-up
2010	Hungarian International	(Germany) Peter Käsbauer	(Netherlands) Jacco Arends (Netherlands) Selena Piek	15–21, 14–21	(silver) Runner-up
2010	Welsh International	(Germany) Peter Käsbauer	(Germany) Josche Zurwonne (Germany) Carla Nelte	21–15, 21–13	(gold) Winner
2012	French International	(Germany) Peter Käsbauer	(Malaysia) Nelson Heg (Malaysia) Chow Mei Kuan	21–12, 21–11	(gold) Winner

BWF International Challenge tournament
BWF International Series tournament
BWF Future Series tournament
