= Carla Nyenhuis =

German badminton player (born 1990)

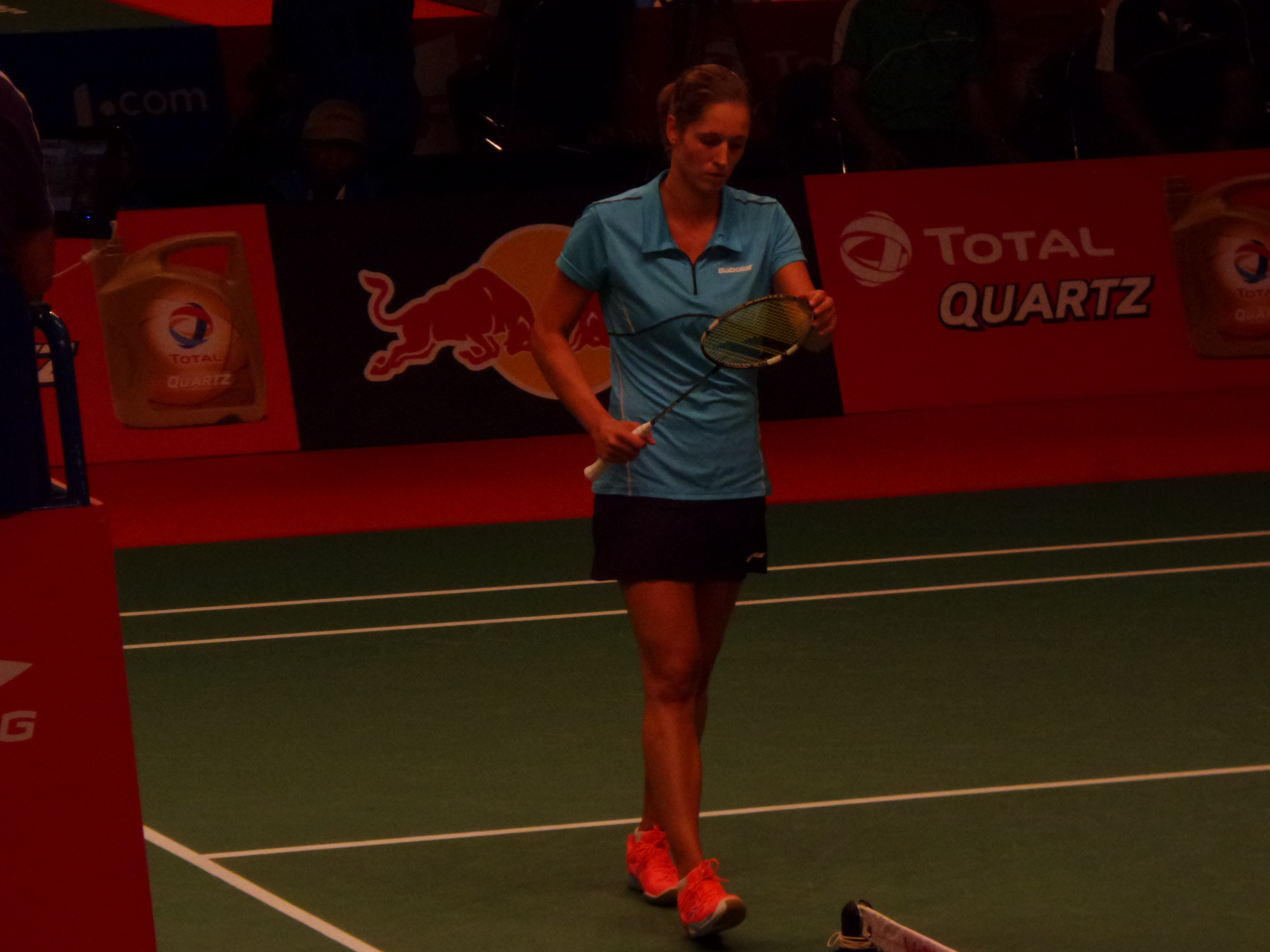
- Nyenhuis in 2015

Personal information
- Born: Carla Nelte; 21 September 1990 (age 36) Luckenwalde, Brandenburg, East Germany
- Height: 1.72 m (5 ft 8 in)
- Weight: 60 kg (132 lb)

Sport
- Country: Germany
- Sport: Badminton
- Handedness: Right

Women's & mixed doubles
- Highest ranking: 17 (WD 18 June 2015); 17 (XD 26 March 2015)
Medal record
Women's badminton
Representing Germany
European Mixed Team Championships
Gold medal – first place	2013 Moscow	Mixed team
Silver medal – second place	2011 Amsterdam	Mixed team
Bronze medal – third place	2015 Leuven	Mixed team
Bronze medal – third place	2017 Lubin	Mixed team
European Women's Team Championships
Gold medal – first place	2012 Amsterdam	Women's team
Silver medal – second place	2018 Kazan	Women's team
Bronze medal – third place	2010 Warsaw	Women's team
Bronze medal – third place	2014 Basel	Women's team
Bronze medal – third place	2016 Kazan	Women's team
European Junior Championships
Bronze medal – third place	2009 Milan	Mixed team

Carla Nyenhuis (née Nelte, born 21 September 1990) is a German badminton player. She started playing badminton at 5 years old in her hometown and became a national team member in 2009. In 2014, she took double victories at the Brasil Open in the women's and mixed doubles event. Teamed-up with Johanna Goliszewski in the women's doubles, they competed at the 2016 Summer Olympics held in Rio de Janeiro, Brazil.

== Achievements ==
=== BWF World Tour ===
The BWF World Tour, which was announced on 19 March 2017 and implemented in 2018, is a series of elite badminton tournaments sanctioned by the Badminton World Federation (BWF). The BWF World Tours are divided into levels of World Tour Finals, Super 1000, Super 750, Super 500, Super 300 (part of the HSBC World Tour), and the BWF Tour Super 100.

Women's doubles
Year	Tournament	Level	Partner	Opponent	Score	Result
2018	Canada Open	Super 100	(Germany) Isabel Herttrich	(Japan) Ayako Sakuramoto (Japan) Yukiko Takahata	13–21, 15–21	(silver) Runner-up

=== BWF Grand Prix ===
The BWF Grand Prix had two levels, the Grand Prix and Grand Prix Gold. It was a series of badminton tournaments sanctioned by the Badminton World Federation (BWF) and played between 2007 and 2017.

Women's doubles
Year	Tournament	Partner	Opponent	Score	Result
2014	Brasil Open	(Germany) Johanna Goliszewski	(Bulgaria) Gabriela Stoeva (Bulgaria) Stefani Stoeva	11–5, 11–7, 4–11, 11–10	(gold) Winner
2015	Russian Open	(Germany) Johanna Goliszewski	(Bulgaria) Gabriela Stoeva (Bulgaria) Stefani Stoeva	15–21, 17–21	(silver) Runner-up

Mixed doubles
Year	Tournament	Partner	Opponent	Score	Result
2014	Canada Open	(Germany) Max Schwenger	(Netherlands) Jorrit de Ruiter (Netherlands) Samantha Barning	21–16, 25–23	(gold) Winner
2014	Brasil Open	(Germany) Max Schwenger	(Republic of Ireland) Sam Magee (Republic of Ireland) Chloe Magee	10–11, 10–11, 11–10, 11–8, 11–7	(gold) Winner

BWF Grand Prix Gold tournament
BWF Grand Prix tournament

=== BWF International Challenge/Series ===
Women's doubles
Year	Tournament	Partner	Opponent	Score	Result
2010	Hungarian International	(Germany) Johanna Goliszewski	(Germany) Kim Buss (Germany) Claudia Vogelgsang	21–14, 22–20	(gold) Winner
2011	Slovenian International	(Germany) Johanna Goliszewski	(Finland) Airi Mikkelä (Finland) Jenny Nyström	21–14, 21–18	(gold) Winner
2012	Croatian International	(Germany) Johanna Goliszewski	(Netherlands) Samantha Barning (Netherlands) Eefje Muskens	18–21, 19–21	(silver) Runner-up
2012	Swiss International	(Germany) Isabel Herttrich	(England) Heather Olver (England) Kate Robertshaw	15–21, 21–15, 21–23	(silver) Runner-up
2013	White Nights	(Germany) Isabel Herttrich	(France) Audrey Fontaine (France) Émilie Lefel	22–20, 21–12	(gold) Winner
2015	Guatemala International	(Germany) Johanna Goliszewski	(United States) Eva Lee (United States) Paula Lynn Obañana	21–18, 24–22	(gold) Winner
2016	Peru International	(Germany) Johanna Goliszewski	(England) Heather Olver (England) Lauren Smith	21–18, 19–21, 21–19	(gold) Winner

Mixed doubles
Year	Tournament	Partner	Opponent	Score	Result
2010	Welsh International	(Germany) Josche Zurwonne	(Germany) Peter Käsbauer (Germany) Johanna Goliszewski	15–21, 13–21	(silver) Runner-up
2014	Bulgarian International	(Germany) Max Schwenger	(Indonesia) Fran Kurniawan (Indonesia) Komala Dewi	21–18, 19–21, 13–21	(silver) Runner-up

BWF International Challenge tournament
BWF International Series tournament
BWF Future Series tournament
