= Line Kjærsfeldt =

Danish badminton player (born 1994)

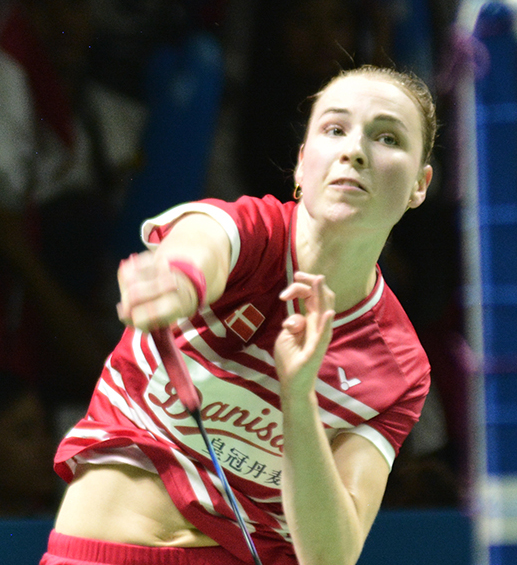
- Kjærsfeldt at the 2018 Indonesia Open

Personal information
- Born: Line Højmark Kjærsfeldt; 20 April 1994 (age 32) Aarhus, Denmark
- Years active: 2010–present
- Height: 1.74 m (5 ft 9 in)

Sport
- Country: Denmark
- Sport: Badminton
- Handedness: Right

Women's singles
- Career record: 290 wins, 230 losses
- Highest ranking: 16 (30 July 2019)
- Current ranking: 18 (10 November 2026)
- BWF profile
Medal record
Women's badminton
Representing Denmark
Sudirman Cup
Bronze medal – third place	2013 Kuala Lumpur	Mixed team
European Games
Gold medal – first place	2015 Baku	Women's singles
Bronze medal – third place	2019 Minsk	Women's singles
European Championships
Gold medal – first place	2025 Horsens	Women's singles
Silver medal – second place	2026 Huelva	Women's singles
Bronze medal – third place	2016 La Roche-sur-Yon	Women's singles
Bronze medal – third place	2018 Huelva	Women's singles
European Mixed Team Championships
Gold medal – first place	2015 Leuven	Mixed team
Gold medal – first place	2017 Lubin	Mixed team
Gold medal – first place	2019 Copenhagen	Mixed team
Gold medal – first place	2021 Vantaa	Mixed team
Gold medal – first place	2023 Aire-sur-la-Lys	Mixed team
Gold medal – first place	2025 Baku	Mixed team
Silver medal – second place	2013 Moscow	Mixed team
European Women's Team Championships
Gold medal – first place	2014 Basel	Women's team
Gold medal – first place	2016 Kazan	Women's team
Gold medal – first place	2018 Kazan	Women's team
Gold medal – first place	2020 Liévin	Women's team
Gold medal – first place	2024 Łódź	Women's team
Silver medal – second place	2012 Amsterdam	Women's team
Silver medal – second place	2026 Istanbul	Women's team
World Junior Championships
Bronze medal – third place	2010 Guadalajara	Girls' doubles
European Junior Championships
Gold medal – first place	2011 Vantaa	Mixed doubles
Gold medal – first place	2013 Ankara	Mixed team
Silver medal – second place	2013 Ankara	Girls' singles
Bronze medal – third place	2011 Vantaa	Girls' doubles
Bronze medal – third place	2011 Vantaa	Mixed team

Line Højmark Kjærsfeldt (born 20 April 1994) is a Danish badminton player specializing in singles. She was a gold medalist in the 2015 European Games and 2025 European Championships. In the juniors, she won a bronze medal at the 2010 BWF World Junior Championships in the women's doubles with Sandra-Maria Jensen.

== Career ==
Kjærsfeldt began to playing badminton at the age of eight, and started to playing competitively at the age of 15. She competed at the 2010 World Junior Championships and won the bronze medal in the girls' doubles partnered with Sandra-Maria Jensen, after in the semi-finals, they were beaten by the Chinese pair Bao Yixin and Ou Dongni in straight games. Kjærsfeldt won her first international title in the women's doubles at the 2011 Croatian International with Jensen. She then played at the Vantaa European Junior Championships, won the gold medal in the mixed doubles with Kim Astrup and bronze medal in the girls' doubles with Jensen. She entered two finals at the Scottish International, and won her first mixed doubles title with Astrup.

In 2012, Kjærsfeldt won her first title of the year at the Banuinvest International in the women's doubles with Sandra-Maria Jensen. In May, Kjærsfeldt finished runner-up at the Denmark International in the mixed doubles with Kim Astrup. She then won her first women's singles title at the Irish Open. After won the title in Ireland, she then entered the top 100 BWF world ranking.

Kjærsfeldt opened the 2013 season by winning the Estonian International. In March, she clinched the girls' singles silver medal at the European Junior Championships, after being defeated by Bulgarian Stefani Stoeva in the final. In 2014, Kjærsfeldt won the Finnish Open, and also runners-up in the Swedish Masters and Irish Open.

Kjærsfeldt competed at the 2015 Baku European Games and won the gold medal in the women's singles. She then won a Grand Prix title at the Scottish Open beating home favorite Kirsty Gilmour in the final in three games. In 2016, she was defeated by Carolina Marín in the semi-finals of the European Championships, settled for the bronze medal. Kjærsfeldt made her debut at the Olympics in Rio 2016, but her pace was stopped in the group stage. In December, she won her second Irish Open title.

== Achievements ==
=== European Games ===
Women's singles
Year	Venue	Opponent	Score	Result	Ref.
2015	Baku Sports Hall; Baku, Azerbaijan	(Belgium) Lianne Tan	18–21, 21–19, 21–9	Gold	
2019	Falcon Club; Minsk, Belarus	(United Kingdom) Kirsty Gilmour	21–13, 16–21, 8–21	Bronze	

=== European Championships ===
Women's singles
Year	Venue	Opponent	Score	Result	Ref.
2016	Vendéspace; La Roche-sur-Yon, France	(Spain) Carolina Marín	21–23, 15–21	Bronze	
2018	Palacio de los Deportes Carolina Marín; Huelva, Spain	(Russia) Evgeniya Kosetskaya	10–21, 14–21	Bronze	
2025	Forum; Horsens, Denmark	(Scotland) Kirsty Gilmour	21–16, 21–17	Gold	
2026	Palacio de los Deportes Carolina Marín, Huelva, Spain	(Scotland) Kirsty Gilmour	17–21, 15–21	Silver	

=== BWF World Junior Championships ===
Girls' doubles
Year	Venue	Partner	Opponent	Score	Result	Ref.
2010	Domo del Code Jalisco; Guadalajara, Mexico	(Denmark) Sandra-Maria Jensen	(China) Bao Yixin (China) Ou Dongni	15–21, 7–21	Bronze	

=== European Junior Championships ===
Girls' singles
Year	Venue	Opponent	Score	Result	Ref.
2013	ASKI Sport Hall; Ankara, Turkey	(Bulgaria) Stefani Stoeva	13–21, 25–23, 19–21	Silver	

Girls' doubles
Year	Venue	Partner	Opponent	Score	Result	Ref.
2011	Energia Areena; Vantaa, Finland	(Denmark) Sandra-Maria Jensen	(Netherlands) Thamar Peters (Netherlands) Josephine Wentholt	21–16, 15–21, 19–21	Bronze	

Mixed doubles
Year	Venue	Partner	Opponent	Score	Result	Ref.
2011	Energia Areena; Vantaa, Finland	(Denmark) Kim Astrup	(England) Matthew Nottingham (England) Helena Lewczynska	19–21, 21–14, 21–16	Gold	

=== BWF World Tour (8 runners-up) ===
The BWF World Tour, which was announced on 19 March 2017 and implemented in 2018, is a series of elite badminton tournaments sanctioned by the Badminton World Federation (BWF). The BWF World Tours are divided into levels of World Tour Finals, Super 1000, Super 750, Super 500, Super 300 (part of the HSBC World Tour), and the BWF Tour Super 100.

Women's singles
Year	Tournament	Level	Opponent	Score	Result	Ref.
2018	Chinese Taipei Open	Super 300	(Chinese Taipei) Tai Tzu-ying	21–17, 10–21, 13–21	(silver) Runner-up	
2018	Scottish Open	Super 100	(Scotland) Kirsty Gilmour	16–21, 21–18, 18–21	(silver) Runner-up	
2019	Spain Masters	Super 300	(Denmark) Mia Blichfeldt	14–21, 14–21	(silver) Runner-up	
2023	Hylo Open	Super 300	(United States) Beiwen Zhang	18–21, 21–16, 16–21	(silver) Runner-up	
2023	Syed Modi International	Super 300	(Japan) Nozomi Okuhara	19–21, 16–21	(silver) Runner-up	
2024	Canada Open	Super 500	(Thailand) Busanan Ongbamrungphan	18–21, 14–21	(silver) Runner-up	
2025	Swiss Open	Super 300	(China) Chen Yufei	17–21, 17–21	(silver) Runner-up	
2026	Hylo Open	Super 500	(India) P. V. Sindhu	12–21, 14–21	(silver) Runner-up	

=== BWF Grand Prix (1 title, 1 runner-up) ===
The BWF Grand Prix had two levels, the Grand Prix and Grand Prix Gold. It was a series of badminton tournaments sanctioned by the Badminton World Federation (BWF) and played between 2007 and 2017.

Women's singles
Year	Tournament	Opponent	Score	Result	Ref.
2015	Scottish Open	(Scotland) Kirsty Gilmour	16–21, 21–16, 21–18	(gold) Winner	

Mixed doubles
Year	Tournament	Partner	Opponent	Score	Result	Ref.
2017	Bitburger Open	(Denmark) Anders Skaarup Rasmussen	(China) He Jiting (China) Du Yue	18–21, 17–21	(silver) Runner-up	

BWF Grand Prix Gold tournament
BWF Grand Prix tournament

=== BWF International Challenge/Series (7 titles, 7 runners-up) ===
Women's singles
Year	Tournament	Opponent	Score	Result	Ref.
2011	Scottish International	(Netherlands) Judith Meulendijks	9–21, 19–21	(silver) Runner-up	
2012	Irish Open	(Republic of Ireland) Chloe Magee	23–21, 18–21, 21–18	(gold) Winner	
2013	Estonian International	(Russia) Natalia Perminova	13–21, 21–18, 21–18	(gold) Winner	
2014	Swedish Masters	(Scotland) Kirsty Gilmour	22–24, 21–12, 10–21	(silver) Runner-up	
2014	Finnish Open	(Denmark) Anna Thea Madsen	21–9, 13–3 Retired	(gold) Winner	
2014	Irish Open	(Spain) Beatriz Corrales	21–23, 13–21	(silver) Runner-up	
2016	Irish Open	(Chinese Taipei) Sung Shuo-yun	21–18, 21–18	(gold) Winner	
2021	Irish Open	(Chinese Taipei) Hsu Wen-chi	9–21, 21–14, 15–21	(silver) Runner-up	
2021	Scottish Open	(Chinese Taipei) Hsu Wen-chi	15–21, 18–21	(silver) Runner-up	

Women's doubles
Year	Tournament	Partner	Opponent	Score	Result	Ref.
2011	Croatian International	(Denmark) Sandra-Maria Jensen	(Poland) Natalia Pocztowiak (Croatia) Staša Poznanović	21–14, 21–18	(gold) Winner	
2012	Banuinvest International	(Denmark) Sandra-Maria Jensen	(Bulgaria) Gabriela Stoeva (Bulgaria) Stefani Stoeva	21–19, 17–21, 21–16	(gold) Winner	

Mixed doubles
Year	Tournament	Partner	Opponent	Score	Result	Ref.
2011	Croatian International	(Denmark) Kim Astrup	(Croatia) Zvonimir Đurkinjak (Croatia) Staša Poznanović	13–21, 13–21	(silver) Runner-up	
2011	Scottish International	(Denmark) Kim Astrup	(Poland) Wojciech Szkudlarczyk (Poland) Agnieszka Wojtkowska	15–21, 21–15, 21–13	(gold) Winner	
2012	Denmark International	(Denmark) Kim Astrup	(Denmark) Mads Pieler Kolding (Denmark) Julie Houmann	19–21, 9–21	(silver) Runner-up	

BWF International Challenge tournament
BWF International Series tournament
BWF Future Series tournament

=== Invitational tournament ===
Women's singles
Year	Tournament	Opponent	Score	Result
2015	Copenhagen Masters	(India) P. V. Sindhu	21–12, 21–19	(gold) Winner
