= Jessica Leung =

Hong Kong politician (born 1993)

Jessica Leung Ka-sin
- 梁嘉善

Secretary-General of the Civic Party
- In office 28 November 2020 – 27 May 2023
- Leader: Alan Leong
- Preceded by: Chan Kai-yuen
- Succeeded by: Party dissolved

Personal details
- Born: 1993 (age 32–33) British Hong Kong
- Party: Civic Party
- Education: University of Hong Kong

Chinese name
- Traditional Chinese: 梁嘉善
- Simplified Chinese: 梁嘉善
Transcriptions
Standard Mandarin
- Hanyu Pinyin: Liáng Jiāshàn
Yue: Cantonese
- Yale Romanization: Lèuhng Gā-sihn
- Jyutping: Loeng^{4} Gaa^{1}sin^{6}

Jessica Leung Ka-sin (Chinese: 梁嘉善; born 1993) is a barrister and politician in Hong Kong. She is the secretary general of the Civic Party.

== Academic record ==
- Bachelor of Social Science (Government and Laws) and Bachelor of Laws (double degree) at the University of Hong Kong

Party political offices
Preceded by Chan Kai-yuen	Secretary-General of Civic Party; 2020–2023	Succeeded by Party dissolved
