= Matthew Nottingham =

English badminton player (born 1992)

Personal information
- Born: 17 May 1992 (age 34) Macclesfield, England
- Height: 1.85 m (6 ft 1 in)

Sport
- Country: England
- Sport: Badminton
- Handedness: Right
- Coached by: Peter Jeffrey; Julian Robertson

Men's doubles & mixed doubles
- Highest ranking: 39 (MD 17 April 2014); 44 (XD 9 June 2016)
- BWF profile
Medal record
Men's badminton
Representing England
European Mixed Team Championships
Silver medal – second place	2015 Leuven	Mixed team
European Men's Team Championships
Silver medal – second place	2014 Basel	Men's team
Bronze medal – third place	2016 Kazan	Men's team
European Junior Championships
Gold medal – first place	2011 Vantaa	Boys' doubles
Silver medal – second place	2011 Vantaa	Mixed doubles

Matthew Nottingham (born 17 May 1992) is a badminton player from England. He started playing badminton at age 3, and joined England national badminton team in 2009. In 2011, he won gold and silver medals at the European Junior Championships in the boys' and mixed doubles events.

== Achievements ==
=== European Junior Championships ===
Boys' doubles
Year	Venue	Partner	Opponent	Score	Result
2011	Energia Areena; Vantaa, Finland	(England) Chris Coles	(Germany) Fabian Holzer (Germany) Max Schwenger	15–21, 21–14, 21–15	Gold

Mixed doubles
Year	Venue	Partner	Opponent	Score	Result
2011	Energia Areena; Vantaa, Finland	(England) Helena Lewczynska	(Denmark) Kim Astrup (Denmark) Line Kjærsfeldt	21–19, 14–21, 16–21	Silver

=== BWF International Challenge/Series ===
Men's doubles
Year	Tournament	Partner	Opponent	Score	Result
2011	Welsh International	(England) Chris Coles	(Scotland) Martin Campbell (Scotland) Angus Gilmour	21–19, 21–7	(gold) Winner
2012	Swiss International	(England) Chris Coles	(Poland) Adam Cwalina (Poland) Przemysław Wacha	21–23, 14–21	(silver) Runner-up
2013	Dutch International	(England) Chris Coles	(Poland) Łukasz Moreń (Poland) Wojciech Szkudlarczyk	13–21, 21–18, 9–21	(silver) Runner-up
2013	Slovenia International	(England) Chris Coles	(Russia) Nikita Khakimov (Russia) Vasily Kuznetsov	19–21, 16–21	(silver) Runner-up
2013	Welsh International	(England) Chris Coles	(Australia) Robin Middleton (Australia) Ross Smith	21–17, 21–15	(gold) Winner
2014	Welsh International	(England) Harley Towler	(Scotland) Adam Hall (Scotland) Gordon Thomson	21–15, 21–13	(gold) Winner
2015	Orléans International	(England) Harley Towler	(Poland) Adam Cwalina (Poland) Przemysław Wacha	21–12, 21–18	(gold) Winner

Mixed doubles

Year	Tournament	Partnet	Opponent	Score	Result
2015	Welsh International	(England) Emily Westwood	(France) Ronan Labar (France) Émilie Lefel	21–13, 25–23	(gold) Winner
2015	Italian International	(England) Emily Westwood	(Denmark) Niclas Nøhr (Denmark) Sara Thygesen	10–21, 21–17, 19–21	(silver) Runner-up
2016	Austrian Open	(England) Emily Westwood	(Denmark) Mathias Christiansen (Denmark) Lena Grebak	17–21, 17–21	(silver) Runner-up

BWF International Challenge tournament
BWF International Series tournament
BWF Future Series tournament
