= Mette Poulsen =

Danish badminton player (born 1993)

Personal information
- Born: 14 June 1993 (age 33) Næstved, Denmark
- Height: 1.75 m (5 ft 9 in)

Sport
- Country: Denmark
- Sport: Badminton
- Handedness: Left

Women's singles & doubles
- Highest ranking: 26 (WS, 29 September 2016); 29 (WD with Alexandra Bøje, 23 March 2021); 91 (XD with Joel Eipe, 22 October 2019)
- BWF profile
Medal record
Women's badminton
Representing Denmark
European Championships
| Bronze medal – third place | 2017 Kolding | Women's singles |
European Women's Team Championships
| Gold medal – first place | 2014 Basel | Women's team |
| Gold medal – first place | 2016 Kazan | Women's team |
| Gold medal – first place | 2020 Liévin | Women's team |
European Mixed Team Championships
| Gold medal – first place | 2021 Vantaa | Mixed team |
European Junior Championships
| Gold medal – first place | 2011 Vantaa | Girls' doubles |
| Bronze medal – third place | 2011 Vantaa | Mixed team |

Mette Poulsen (born 14 June 1993) is a Danish badminton player. She was the girls' doubles gold medalist at the 2011 European Junior Championships, and the women's singles bronze medalist at the 2017 European Championships. Poulsen helped the national team win the European Women's Team Championships in 2014, 2016 and 2020.

== Achievements ==
=== European Championships ===
Women's singles
| Year | Venue | Opponent | Score | Result |
|---|---|---|---|---|
| 2017 | Sydbank Arena; Kolding, Denmark | (Spain) Carolina Marín | 17–21, 12–21 | Bronze |

=== European Junior Championships ===
Girls' doubles
| Year | Venue | Partner | Opponent | Score | Result |
|---|---|---|---|---|---|
| 2011 | Energia Areena; Vantaa, Finland | (Denmark) Ditte Strunge Larsen | (Netherlands) Thamar Peters (Netherlands) Josephine Wentholt | 13–21, 22–20, 21–17 | Gold |

=== BWF Grand Prix ===
The BWF Grand Prix had two levels, the Grand Prix and Grand Prix Gold. It was a series of badminton tournaments sanctioned by the Badminton World Federation (BWF) and played between 2007 and 2017.

Women's singles
| Year | Tournament | Opponent | Score | Result |
|---|---|---|---|---|
| 2016 | Scottish Open | (Switzerland) Sabrina Jaquet | 21–18, 17–21, 21–14 | (gold) Winner |

BWF Grand Prix Gold tournament
BWF Grand Prix tournament

=== BWF International Challenge/Series (5 titles, 5 runners-up) ===
Women's singles
| Year | Tournament | Opponent | Score | Result |
|---|---|---|---|---|
| 2013 | Denmark International | (Germany) Olga Konon | 15–21, 10–21 | (silver) Runner-up |
| 2014 | Croatian International | (Turkey) Özge Bayrak | 23–25, 21–19, 21–16 | (gold) Winner |
| 2015 | Iceland International | (Finland) Nanna Vainio | 21–11, 21–9 | (gold) Winner |
| 2016 | Dutch International | (Germany) Yvonne Li | 18–21, 18–21 | (silver) Runner-up |
| 2016 | Czech International | (Denmark) Natalia Koch Rohde | 10–21, 15–21 | (silver) Runner-up |

Women's doubles
| Year | Tournament | Partner | Opponent | Score | Result |
|---|---|---|---|---|---|
| 2019 | Polish Open | (Denmark) Alexandra Bøje | (Japan) Chisato Hoshi (Japan) Aoi Matsuda | 18–21, 21–15, 17–21 | (silver) Runner-up |
| 2019 | Dubai International | (Denmark) Alexandra Bøje | (Japan) Rin Iwanaga (Japan) Kie Nakanishi | 21–18, 15–21, 17–21 | (silver) Runner-up |

Mixed doubles
| Year | Tournament | Partner | Opponent | Score | Result |
|---|---|---|---|---|---|
| 2010 | Iceland International | (Denmark) Frederik Colberg | (Denmark) Kasper Paulsen (Denmark) Josephine van Zaane | 21–17, 8–21, 21–16 | (gold) Winner |
| 2018 | Hungarian International | (Denmark) Joel Eipe | (Russia) Rodion Alimov (Russia) Alina Davletova | 21–10, 19–21, 21–10 | (gold) Winner |
| 2018 | Norwegian International | (Denmark) Joel Eipe | (Denmark) Mathias Moldt Baskjær (Denmark) Marie Louise Steffensen | 21–12, 21–14 | (gold) Winner |

BWF International Challenge tournament
BWF International Series tournament
BWF Future Series tournament
