= Hayley Rogers =

English badminton player (born 1992)

Personal information
- Born: 7 September 1992 (age 34)

Sport
- Country: England
- Sport: Badminton

Women's
- Highest ranking: 230 (WS) 25 Oct 2012; 66 (WD) 14 Jun 2012; 278 (XD) 22 Sep 2011
- BWF profile

Hayley Rogers (born 7 September 1992) is a female badminton player from England. She studied mathematics and neuroscience at Keele University.

== Achievements ==
=== BWF International Challenge/Series ===
Women's Doubles
Year	Tournament	Partner	Opponent	Score	Result
2012	Portugal International	(England) Helena Lewczynska	(England) Alexandra Langley (England) Gabrielle White	21-11, 21–19	(silver) Runner-up

Commonwealth Youth Games tournament
BWF International Series tournament
BWF Future Series tournament
