= 2015 European Mixed Team Badminton Championships =

Tournament details
- Dates: 11–15 February 2015
- Venue: Sportoase
- Location: Leuven, Belgium

The 2015 European Mixed Team Badminton Championships were held at the Sportoase in Leuven, Belgium, between 11 and 15 February and were organised by Badminton Europe and Badminton Vlaanderen. It was the 23rd edition of the tournament. Germany was the defending champion. The draw was made on 18 December 2014.

== Participating Countries ==
33 national teams entered the competition of which 12 are participating in the final event. Five countries qualified for the final directly, the remaining nations qualified by winning their qualification group.

Belgium	Qualified directly (host)
Germany	Qualified directly (reigning champion)
Denmark	Qualified directly (ranked #1 in Europe*)
England	Qualified directly (ranked #2 in Europe*)
Russia	Qualified directly (ranked #3 in Europe*)
Netherlands	Qualified via Group 1
Scotland	Qualified via Group 2
France	Qualified via Group 3
Sweden	Qualified via Group 4
~~Spain~~	Qualified via Group 5
Ireland	Qualified via Group 6
Poland	Qualified via Group 7

* — at the time of the entry deadline, not taken into consideration ranking of Belgium and Germany.

One day before the start of the event, Spain withdrew their team from the competition.

== Group stage ==
=== Group 1 ===
Pos	Team	Pld	W	L	MF	MA	MD	GF	GA	GD	PF	PA	PD	Pts	Qualification
1	Denmark	2	2	0	8	2	+6	16	5	+11	411	325	+86	2	Knockout stage
2	Netherlands	2	1	1	7	3	+4	14	7	+7	400	357	+43	1	Knockout stage
3	Poland	2	0	2	0	10	−10	2	20	−18	322	451	−129	0	

Source: BWF

==== Netherlands vs Poland ====
Netherlands
5
Sportoase, Court 2
11 February 2015, 14:30

Poland
0

			1	2	3
1	(Netherlands) (Poland)	Jacco Arends / Selena Piek; Robert Mateusiak / Agnieszka Wojtkowska	15; 21	18; 21
2	(Netherlands) (Poland)	Eric Pang; Michał Rogalski	14; 21	21; 13	21; 18
3	(Netherlands) (Poland)	Soraya de Visch Eijbergen; Weronika Grudzina	21; 14	21; 12
4	(Netherlands) (Poland)	Jacco Arends / Jelle Maas; Adam Cwalina / Przemysław Wacha	21; 17	21; 14
5	(Netherlands) (Poland)	Samantha Barning / Iris Tabeling; Agnieszka Wojtkowska / Aneta Wojtkowska	21; 14	21; 17

==== Denmark vs Poland ====
Denmark
5
Sportoase, Court 1
12 February 2015, 10:00

Poland
0

			1	2	3
1	(Denmark) (Poland)	Anna Thea Madsen; Weronika Grudzina	21; 10	21; 11
2	(Denmark) (Poland)	Viktor Axelsen; Adrian Dziółko	21; 13	21; 13
3	(Denmark) (Poland)	Line Kjærsfeldt / Sara Thygesen; Agnieszka Wojtkowska / Aneta Wojtkowska	21; 11	17; 21	21; 15
4	(Denmark) (Poland)	Mads Conrad-Petersen / Mads Pieler Kolding; Adam Cwalina / Przemysław Wacha	21; 13	21; 17
5	(Denmark) (Poland)	Joachim Fischer Nielsen / Christinna Pedersen; Robert Mateusiak / Agnieszka Wojtkowska	21; 7	21; 18

==== Denmark vs Netherlands ====
Denmark
5
Sportoase, Court 2
12 Februar 2015, 19:00

Netherlands
0

			1	2	3
1	(Denmark) (Netherlands)	Jan Ø. Jørgensen; Eric Pang	21; 17	21; 18
2	(Denmark) (Netherlands)	Line Kjærsfeldt; Soraya de Visch Eijbergen	21; 12	23; 21
3	(Denmark) (Netherlands)	Kim Astrup / Anders Skaarup Rasmussen; Jacco Arends / Jelle Maas	15; 21	15; 21
4	(Denmark) (Netherlands)	Anna Thea Madsen / Sara Thygesen; Eefje Muskens / Selena Piek	9; 21	17; 21
5	(Denmark) (Netherlands)	Joachim Fischer Nielsen / Christinna Pedersen; Jorrit de Ruiter / Samantha Barning	21; 10	21; 14

=== Group 2 ===
Pos	Team	Pld	W	L	MF	MA	MD	GF	GA	GD	PF	PA	PD	Pts	Qualification
1	England	2	2	0	10	0	+10	20	2	+18	461	302	+159	2	Knockout stage
2	Ireland	2	1	1	3	7	−4	7	14	−7	326	397	−71	1	Knockout stage
3	Belgium (H)	2	0	2	2	8	−6	6	17	−11	364	452	−88	0	

Source: BWF
(H) Host

==== Ireland vs Belgium ====
Ireland
3
Sportoase, Court 1
11 February 2015, 14:30

Belgium
2

			1	2	3
1	(Republic of Ireland) (Belgium)	Sam Magee / Chloe Magee; Nick Marcoen / Flore Vandenhoucke	21; 10	21; 17
2	(Republic of Ireland) (Belgium)	Scott Evans; Yuhan Tan	21; 13	21; 17
3	(Republic of Ireland) (Belgium)	Chloe Magee; Lianne Tan	21; 12	21; 17
4	(Republic of Ireland) (Belgium)	Scott Evans / Sam Magee; Matijs Dierickx / Freek Golinski	14; 21	21; 17	15; 21
5	(Republic of Ireland) (Belgium)	Sara Boyle / Rachael Darragh; Steffi Annys / Flore Vandenhoucke	13; 21	12; 21

==== England vs Ireland ====
England
5
Sportoase, Court 2
12 February 2015, 10:00

Ireland
0

			1	2	3
1	(England) (Republic of Ireland)	Chris Adcock / Gabby Adcock; Sam Magee / Rachael Darragh	21; 18	21; 17
2	(England) (Republic of Ireland)	Rajiv Ouseph; Scott Evans	21; 7	21; 16
3	(England) (Republic of Ireland)	Fontaine Wright; Sara Boyle	21; 14	21; 11
4	(England) (Republic of Ireland)	Andrew Ellis / Peter Mills; Joshua Magee / Sam Magee	21; 12	21; 11
5	(England) (Republic of Ireland)	Heather Olver / Lauren Smith; Sara Boyle / Rachael Darragh

==== England vs Belgium ====
England
5
Sportoase, Court 1
12 Februar 2015, 19:00

Belgium
0

			1	2	3
1	(England) (Belgium)	Fontaine Wright; Lianne Tan	20; 22	21; 13	21; 14
2	(England) (Belgium)	Toby Penty; Yuhan Tan	21; 13	21; 23	21; 18
3	(England) (Belgium)	Heather Olver / Lauren Smith; Steffi Annys / Flore Vandenhoucke	21; 12	21; 15
4	(England) (Belgium)	Marcus Ellis / Chris Langridge; Matijs Dierickx / Freek Golinski	21; 14	21; 13
5	(England) (Belgium)	Chris Adcock / Gabby Adcock; Floris Oleffe / Steffi Annys	21; 14	21; 6

=== Group 3 ===
Pos	Team	Pld	W	L	MF	MA	MD	GF	GA	GD	PF	PA	PD	Pts	Qualification
1	Scotland	1	1	0	3	2	+1	6	6	0	213	228	−15	1	Knockout stage
2	Germany	1	0	1	2	3	−1	6	6	0	228	213	+15	0	
3	Spain	0	0	0	0	0	0	0	0	0	0	0	0	0	Withdrew

Source: BWF

==== Spain vs Scotland ====
Spain
Withdrew
Sportoase, Court 1
11 February 2015, 14:30

Scotland
-

		1	2	3
1	(Spain) (Scotland)
2	(Spain) (Scotland)
3	(Spain) (Scotland)
4	(Spain) (Scotland)
5	(Spain) (Scotland)

==== Germany vs Scotland ====
Germany
2
Sportoase, Court 2
12 February 2015, 14:30

Scotland
3

			1	2	3
1	(Germany) (Scotland)	Karin Schnaase; Kirsty Gilmour	15; 21	15; 21
2	(Germany) (Scotland)	Dieter Domke; Kieran Merrilees	21; 21	21; 13	20; 22
3	(Germany) (Scotland)	Johanna Goliszewski / Carla Nelte; Imogen Bankier / Kirsty Gilmour	21; 17	22; 20
4	(Germany) (Scotland)	Max Schwenger / Josche Zurwonne; Martin Campbell / Paul van Rietvelde	21; 5	21; 17
5	(Germany) (Scotland)	Michael Fuchs / Birgit Michels; Robert Blair / Imogen Bankier	21; 12	12; 21	18; 21

==== Germany vs Spain ====
Germany
-
Sportoase, Court 1
12 Februar 2015, 19:00

Spain
Withdrew

		1	2	3
1	(Germany) (Spain)
2	(Germany) (Spain)
3	(Germany) (Spain)
4	(Germany) (Spain)
5	(Germany) (Spain)

=== Group 4 ===
Pos	Team	Pld	W	L	MF	MA	MD	GF	GA	GD	PF	PA	PD	Pts	Qualification
1	France	2	2	0	7	3	+4	15	8	+7	456	408	+48	2	Knockout stage
2	Russia	2	1	1	5	5	0	11	13	−2	443	440	+3	1	Knockout stage
3	Sweden	2	0	2	3	7	−4	9	14	−5	409	460	−51	0	

Source: BWF

==== Sweden vs France ====
Sweden
1
Sportoase, Court 2
11 February 2015, 10:00

France
4

			1	2	3
1	(Sweden) (France)	Jonathan Nordh / Emelie Lennartsson; Ronan Labar / Émilie Lefel	15; 21	21; 23
2	(Sweden) (France)	Gabriel Ulldahl; Brice Leverdez	26; 24	21; 17
3	(Sweden) (France)	Ellinor Widh; Sashina Vignes Waran	14; 21	21; 19	14; 21
4	(Sweden) (France)	Filip Michael Duwall Myhren / Nico Ruponen; Baptiste Carême / Ronan Labar	10; 21	13; 21
5	(Sweden) (France)	Emelie Lennartsson / Emma Wengberg; Delphine Lansac / Émilie Lefel	19; 21	20; 22

==== Russia vs Sweden ====
Russia
3
Sportoase, Court 1
11 February 2015, 19:00

Sweden
2

			1	2	3
1	(Russia) (Sweden)	Ksenia Polikarpova; Ellinor Widh	21; 7	19; 21	21; 15
2	(Russia) (Sweden)	Vladimir Malkov; Mattias Borg	18; 21	18; 21
3	(Russia) (Sweden)	Ekaterina Bolotova / Evgeniya Kosetskaya; Emelie Lennartsson / Emma Wengberg	21; 13	9; 21	21; 15
4	(Russia) (Sweden)	Vladimir Ivanov / Ivan Sozonov; Filip Michael Duwall Myhren / Nico Ruponen	19; 21	18; 21
5	(Russia) (Sweden)	Vitalij Durkin / Nina Vislova; Jonathan Nordh / Emelie Lennartsson	21; 18	23; 21

==== Russia vs France ====
Russia
2
Sportoase, Court 2
12 Februar 2015, 14:30

France
3

			1	2	3
1	(Russia) (France)	Vitalij Durkin / Nina Vislova; Ronan Labar / Émilie Lefel	21; 16	16; 21	11; 21
2	(Russia) (France)	Vladimir Malkov; Brice Leverdez	16; 21	18; 21
3	(Russia) (France)	Ksenia Polikarpova; Sashina Vignes Waran	19; 21	19; 21
4	(Russia) (France)	Vladimir Ivanov / Ivan Sozonov; Baptiste Carême / Ronan Labar	21; 14	10; 21	21; 18
5	(Russia) (France)	Ekaterina Bolotova / Evgeniya Kosetskaya; Delphine Lansac / Émilie Lefel	21; 18	21; 12

== Knockout stage ==
Quarter-finals
13 February
Denmark	3
Ireland	1
13 February
France	2
Germany	3
13 February
Russia	3
Scotland	1
13 February
Netherlands	1
England	3

Semi-finals
14 February
Denmark	3
Germany	2
14 February
Russia	2
England	3

Final
15 February
Denmark	3
England	0

=== Quarterfinals ===
Russia
3
Report
13 February 2015

Scotland
1

			1	2	3
1	(Russia) (Scotland)	Vladimir Ivanov / Evgeniya Kosetskaya; Robert Blair / Imogen Bankier	21; 12	21; 16
2	(Russia) (Scotland)	Vladimir Malkov; Kieran Merrilees	21; 11	21; 17
3	(Russia) (Scotland)	Ksenia Polikarpova; Kirsty Gilmour	15; 21	5; 21
4	(Russia) (Scotland)	Vladimir Ivanov / Ivan Sozonov; Robert Blair / Paul Van Rietvelde	22; 20	21; 16
5	(Russia) (Scotland)	Ekaterina Bolotova / Evgeniya Kosetskaya; Imogen Bankier / Kirsty Gilmour				not played

Netherlands
1
Report
13 February 2015

England
3

			1	2	3
1	(Netherlands) (England)	Jacco Arends / Selena Piek; Chris Adcock / Gabrielle Adcock	15; 21	18; 21
2	(Netherlands) (England)	Eric Pang; Rajiv Ouseph	18; 21	17; 21
3	(Netherlands) (England)	Soraya De Visch Eijbergen; Fontaine Mica Chapman	15; 21	21; 16	21; 11
4	(Netherlands) (England)	Jacco Arends / Jelle Maas; Marcus Ellis / Chris Langridge	13; 21	21; 17	13; 21
5	(Netherlands) (England)	Eefje Muskens / Selena Piek; Gabrielle Adcock / Lauren Smith				not played

Denmark
3
Report
13 February 2015

Ireland
1

			1	2	3
1	(Denmark) (Republic of Ireland)	Joachim Fischer Nielsen / Christinna Pedersen; Sam Magee / Chloe Magee	21; 18	21; 13
2	(Denmark) (Republic of Ireland)	Jan Ø. Jørgensen; Scott Evans	17; 21	21; 17	21; 12
3	(Denmark) (Republic of Ireland)	Line Kjaersfeldt; Chloe Magee	16; 21	23; 21	11; 21
4	(Denmark) (Republic of Ireland)	Anders Skaarup Rasmussen / Kim Astrup Sorensen; Joshua Magee / Sam Magee	21; 17	21; 16
5	(Denmark) (Republic of Ireland)	Christinna Pedersen / Kamilla Rytter Juhl; Sara Boyle / Rachael Darragh				not played

France
2
Report
13 February 2015

Germany
3

			1	2	3
1	(France) (Germany)	Lucas Corvee; Fabian Roth	21; 16	21; 18
2	(France) (Germany)	Sashina Vignes Waran; Karin Schnaase	17; 21	21; 18	21; 19
3	(France) (Germany)	Ronan Labar / Baptiste Careme; Josche Zurwonne / Max Schwenger	21; 14	19; 21	19; 21
4	(France) (Germany)	Emilie Lefel / Delphine Lansac; Johanna Goliszewski / Carla Nelte	11; 21	18; 21
5	(France) (Germany)	Gaetan Mittelheisser / Audrey Fontaine; Michael Fuchs / Birgit Michels	22; 24	17; 21

=== Semifinals ===
Russia
2
Report
14 February 2015

England
3

			1	2	3
1	(Russia) (England)	Vladimir Ivanov / Evgeniya Kosetskaya; Chris Adcock / Gabrielle Adcock	21; 17	17; 21	21; 13
2	(Russia) (England)	Vladimir Malkov; Rajiv Ouseph	15; 21	21; 11	18; 21
3	(Russia) (England)	Ksenia Polikarpova; Fontaine Mica Chapman	17; 21	15; 21
4	(Russia) (England)	Vladimir Ivanov / Ivan Sozonov; Marcus Ellis / Chris Langridge	22; 20	15; 21	21; 13
5	(Russia) (England)	Ekaterina Bolotova / Evgeniya Kosetskaya; Gabrielle Adcock / Lauren Smith	12; 21	21; 15	16; 21

Denmark
3
Report
14 February 2015

Germany
2

			1	2	3
1	(Denmark) (Germany)	Joachim Fischer Nielsen / Christinna Pedersen; Max Schwenger / Carla Nelte	21; 17	21; 17
2	(Denmark) (Germany)	Viktor Axelsen; Dieter Domke	21; 15	21; 12
3	(Denmark) (Germany)	Anna Thea Madsen; Karin Schnaase	18; 21	21; 11	14; 21
4	(Denmark) (Germany)	Mads Pieler Kolding / Mads Conrad-Petersen; Michael Fuchs / Max Schwenger	16; 21	13; 21
5	(Denmark) (Germany)	Christinna Pedersen / Kamilla Rytter Juhl; Johanna Goliszewski / Carla Nelte	21; 15	21; 9

=== Final ===
Denmark
3
Report
15 February 2015

England
0

			1	2	3
1	(Denmark) (England)	Line Kjærsfeldt; Fontaine Mica Chapman	21; 14	21; 11
2	(Denmark) (England)	Jan Ø. Jørgensen; Toby Penty	21; 18	21; 14
3	(Denmark) (England)	Christinna Pedersen / Kamilla Rytter Juhl; Heather Olver / Lauren Smith	21; 9	21; 14
4	(Denmark) (England)	Mads Conrad-Petersen / Mads Pieler Kolding; Chris Langridge / Marcus Ellis				not played
5	(Denmark) (England)	Christinna Pedersen / Joachim Fischer Nielsen; Chris Adcock / Gabrielle Adcock				not played
