= Helena Lewczynska =

English badminton player (born 1992)

Personal information
- Born: 13 February 1992 (age 34) Radlett, England

Sport
- Country: England
- Sport: Badminton
- Event: Women's badminton

Women's badminton
- BWF profile
Medal record
Badminton
Representing England
European Junior Championships
Silver medal – second place	2011 Vantaa	Mixed doubles

Helena Lewczynska (born 13 February 1992) is a badminton player from England. She started playing badminton at age 7, and won a silver medal at the 2011 European Junior Badminton Championships in the mixed doubles event. She studied Geography Bsc at the University of Leeds.

== Achievements ==
=== European Junior Badminton Championships ===
Mixed doubles
Year	Venue	Partner	Opponent	Score	Result
2011	Vantaan Energia Arena; Vantaa, Finland	(England) Matthew Nottingham	(Denmark) Kim Astrup Sorensen (Denmark) Line Kjærsfeldt	21-19, 14-21, 16-21	Silver

=== BWF International Challenge/Series ===
Women's doubles
Year	Tournament	Partner	Opponent	Score	Result
2012	Portugal International	(England) Hayley Rogers	(England) Alexandra Langley (England) Gabrielle White	11–21, 19–21	(silver) Runner-up

Commonwealth Youth Games tournament
BWF International Series tournament
BWF Future Series tournament
