= Energia Areena =

Indoor arena in Vantaa, Finland

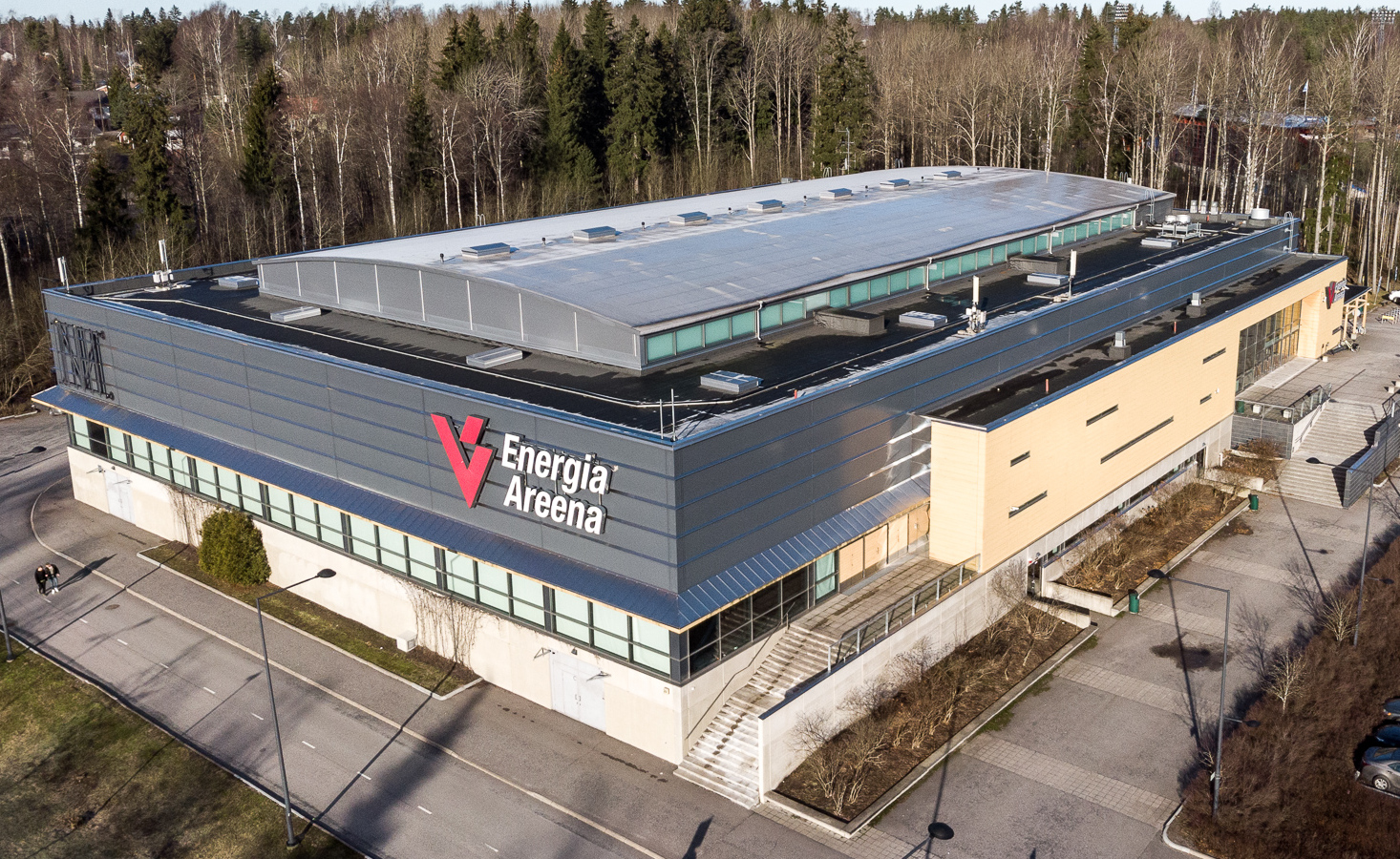
- Interactive map of Energia Areena
- Full name: Vantaan Energia -areena
- Address: Rajatorpantie 23; 01600 Vantaa; Finland
- Location: Myyrmäki Sports Centre
- Coordinates: 60°15′35″N 24°50′19″E
- Capacity: 3,500 (2,600 seated)
- Field size: 2,500 m^{2} (27,000 ft^{2})

Construction
- Opened: 2006
- Architect: Jukka Siren

Tenants
- Finnish men's national basketball team; Finnish women's national basketball team; EräViikingit (floorball)

Website
- energia-areena.fi

Energia Areena is a multifunctional indoor arena in the Myyrmäki Sports Park, located in the Myyrmäki district of Vantaa, Finland. The arena gets its name from its largest sponsor, the energy company Vantaan Energia.

== Events ==
The venue is able to be modified to accommodate corporate, cultural, and concert events, among others, but is best known for its athletic uses. Energia Areena is equipped to host floorball, badminton, volleyball, basketball, handball and futsal practices and games, in addition to gymnastics and cheerleading competitions.

Energia Areena previously served as home to the Finnish men's and women's national basketball teams. It is also home to the EräViikingit men's floorball team, which plays in the F-liiga. The venue also hosted the 2021 Sudirman Cup.

== See also ==
- List of indoor arenas in Finland
- List of indoor arenas in Nordic countries
- Myyrmäki Football Stadium
