= 2009 BWF World Junior Championships – Girls' singles =

2009 BWF World Junior Championships Girls' Singles
Tournament details
- Dates: 28 October 2009 – 1 November 2009
- Edition: 20th
- Level: International
- Venue: Sultan Abdul Halim Stadium
- Location: Alor Setar, Malaysia

The girls' singles of the tournament 2009 BWF World Junior Championships was held on 28 October–1 November 2009. Thai player Ratchanok Inthanon took out the girls' singles final as she defeated fellow countrywoman Porntip Buranaprasertsuk in three sets.

== Seeds ==
1. (China) Chen Xiaojia (semi-final)
2. (Indonesia) Febby Angguni (second round)
3. (Indonesia) Ana Rovita (quarter-final)
4. (Russia) Natalia Perminova (third round)
5. (Thailand) Porntip Buranaprasertsuk (final)
6. (Thailand) Ratchanok Inthanon (champion)
7. (Germany) Lisa Heidenreich (second round)
8. (Indonesia) Siti Anida Lestari Qoryatin (quarter-final)
9. (Malaysia) Tee Jing Yi (quarter-final)
10. (Germany) Alina Hammes (second round)
11. (Denmark) Lene Clausen (fourth round)
12. (Germany) Fabienne Deprez (third round)
13. (Thailand) Sapsiree Taerattanachai (fourth round)
14. (Japan) Sayaka Takahashi (third round)
15. (Netherlands) Iris Tabeling (third round)
16. (Singapore) Chen Jiayuan (fourth round)

== Draw ==
=== Finals ===
Quarterfinals
1	(China) Chen Xiaojia	21	21
5/8	(Indonesia) Siti Anida Lestari Qoryatin	8	12
(Japan) Minatsu Mitani	13	14
5/8	(Thailand) Porntip Buranaprasertsuk	21	21
5/8	(Thailand) Ratchanok Inthanon	21	21
3/4	(Indonesia) Ana Rovita	9	11
9/16	(Malaysia) Tee Jing Yi	13	17
(China) Suo Di	21	21

Semifinals
1	(China) Chen Xiaojia	21	18	19
5/8	(Thailand) Porntip Buranaprasertsuk	18	21	21
5/8	(Thailand) Ratchanok Inthanon	21	21
(China) Suo Di	14	18

Final
5/8	(Thailand) Porntip Buranaprasertsuk	15	23	10
5/8	(Thailand) Ratchanok Inthanon	21	21	21

=== Top half ===
==== Section 1 ====
First round
(Sri Lanka) A Rathnasiri	17	24
(France) L Meheust	21	26
(Sri Lanka) S Weerasinghe	21	21	13
(Canada) S Kong	16	23	21
(Malaysia) S Cheah	21	21
(Chinese Taipei) Chen C-Y	12	4

Second round
1	(China) Chen XJ	21	21
(Macau) Ieong PS	8	7
(Indonesia) E Purwaningtyas	17	21	21
(France) L Meheust	21	6	17
9/16	(Japan) S Takahashi	21	21
(Vietnam) Nguyen TMA	9	5
(Canada) S Kong	11	15
(Malaysia) S Cheah	21	21

Third round
1	(China) Chen XJ	17	21	21
(Indonesia) E Purwaningtyas	21	11	6
9/16	(Japan) S Takahashi	20	16
(Malaysia) S Cheah	22	21

Fourth round
1	(China) Chen XJ	21	21
(Malaysia) S Cheah	17	19

==== Section 2 ====
First round
(Macau) A De Assis	11	8
(Singapore) N Goh	21	21
(Chinese Taipei) Lu C-C	20	21	21
(Australia) L Choo	22	18	11
(Philippines) M Alcala	21	13	17
(Malaysia) Yang LL	15	21	21

Second round
5/8	(Indonesia) S Anida	24	21
(Russia) A Nazarchuk	22	12
(Turkey) O Bayrak	12
(Singapore) N Goh	14^{r}
9/16	(Germany) F Deprez	21	21
(New Zealand) M Chan	7	7
(Chinese Taipei) Lu C-C	16	25	21
(Malaysia) Yang LL	21	23	18

Third round
5/8	(Indonesia) S Anida	21	21
(Turkey) O Bayrak	13	7
9/16	(Germany) F Deprez	21	17	11
(Chinese Taipei) Lu C-C	7	21	21

Fourth round
5/8	(Indonesia) S Anida	21	14	21
(Chinese Taipei) Lu C-C	17	21	14

==== Section 3 ====
First round
(Japan) M Mitani	21	21
(Denmark) S Jensen	12	7
(India) S Reddy	12	8
(Hong Kong) Poon LY	21	21
(Kazakhstan) I Filipchuk	wo
(New Zealand) S Leydon-Davis

Second round
3/4	(Russia) N Perminova	21	22	21
(Vietnam) Le TH	17	24	11
(Denmark) L Kjaersfeldt	11	9
(Japan) M Mitani	21	21
9/16	(Germany) A Hammes	21	16	13
(Singapore) Thng TT	17	21	21
(Hong Kong) Poon LY	21	21
(New Zealand) S Leydon-Davis	8	4

Third round
3/4	(Russia) N Perminova	21	17	12
(Japan) M Mitani	12	21	21
(Singapore) Thng TT	14	18
(Hong Kong) Poon LY	21	21

Fourth round
(Japan) M Mitani	21	21
(Hong Kong) Poon LY	13	19

==== Section 4 ====
First round
(Vietnam) Vu TT
(Cambodia) V Rany	wo
(England) A Langley	21	21
(New Zealand) M Stapleton	9	4
(Macau) Fong SC	10	16
(Canada) K Dejak	21	21

Second round
5/8	(Thailand) P Buranaprasertsuk	21	21
(Australia) T Pilven	9	8
(Australia) L Ma	20	15
(Vietnam) Vu TT	22	21
9/16	(Thailand) S Taerattanachai	21	21
(Turkey) E Gokal	9	7
(England) A Langley	21	21
(Canada) K Dejak	13	14

Third round
5/8	(Thailand) P Buranaprasertsuk	21	21
(Vietnam) Vu TT	11	10
9/16	(Thailand) S Taerattanachai	21	21
(England) A Langley	8	15

Fourth round
5/8	(Thailand) P Buranaprasertsuk	9	21	21
9/16	(Thailand) S Taerattanachai	21	10	17

=== Bottom half ===
==== Section 5 ====
First round
(India) S Rane	21	21
(Canada) L Inglis	10	15
(Hong Kong) Yeung YK
(Cambodia) K Ratanisha	WO
(Turkey) R Kurtulus	14	8
(Singapore) Tan WH	21	21
(Australia) V Na	15	20
(Philippines) G Castelo	21	22

Second round
(India) S Rane	21	21
(Hong Kong) Yeung YK	16	12
(Russia) E Komendrovskaya	18	10
9/16	(Singapore) Chen JY	21	21
(Singapore) Tan WH	29	21
(Philippines) G Castelo	27	13
(India) P Sindhu	15	10
5/8	(Thailand) R Inthanon	21	21

Third round
(India) S Rane	17	13
9/16	(Singapore) Chen JY	21	21
(Singapore) Tan WH	13	10
5/8	(Thailand) R Inthanon	21	21

Fourth round
9/16	(Singapore) Chen JY	12	22	13
5/8	(Thailand) R Inthanon	21	20	21

==== Section 6 ====
First round
(Germany) I Wienefeld	22	18	21
(Turkey) C Fere	20	21	9
(Malaysia) F Ng	13	15
(India) P Thulasi	21	21
(Vietnam) Nguyen TS	16	16
(Japan) M Takagi	21	21

Second round
(Germany) I Wienefeld	20	16
(India) P Thulasi	22	21
(England) A Lim	8	13
9/16	(Denmark) L Clausen	21	21
(Japan) M Takagi	21	23
(Canada) M Li	13	21
(Sri Lanka) O Kuruppu	6	12
3/4	(Indonesia) A Rovita	21	21

Third round
(India) P Thulasi	18	21	14
9/16	(Denmark) L Clausen	21	16	21
(Japan) M Takagi	21	16	15
3/4	(Indonesia) A Rovita	19	21	21

Fourth round
9/16	(Denmark) L Clausen	12	5^{r}
3/4	(Indonesia) A Rovita	21	11

==== Section 7 ====
First round
(France) M Maunoury	21	21
(Kazakhstan) V Kharchenko	12	4
(Thailand) N Jindapon	21	21
(Macau) Iao MH	6	8
(Chinese Taipei) Pai Y-P	10	20
(Hong Kong) Tse YS	21	22

Second round
(France) M Maunoury	9	10
(Thailand) N Jindapon	21	21
(Cambodia) S Sovanpich	wo
9/16	(Malaysia) Tee JY
(Hong Kong) Tse YS	21	21
(New Zealand) V Cheng	13	9
(Austria) A Mathis	21	13	21
5/8	(Germany) L Heidenreich	18	21	8

Third round
(Thailand) N Jindapon	14	13
9/16	(Malaysia) Tee JY	21	21
(Hong Kong) Tse YS	21	21
(Austria) A Mathis	14	8

Fourth round
9/16	(Malaysia) Tee JY	21	21
(Hong Kong) Tse YS	9	10

==== Section 8 ====
First round
(Japan) K Konishi	21	21
(Czech Republic) L Havlova	11	5
(Sri Lanka) S Illangakoon	16	14
(England) S Milne	21	21
(China) Deng X	21	21
(Russia) A Chervaykova	5	15

Second round
(Japan) K Konishi	18	8
(England) S Milne	21	21
(Hong Kong) Leung KY	16	22	18
9/16	(Netherlands) I Tabeling	21	20	21
(China) Deng X	16	21	21
(China) Yao X	21	10	18
(China) Suo D	18	21	21
2	(Indonesia) F Angguni	21	17	13

Third round
(England) S Milne	10	21	21
9/16	(Netherlands) I Tabeling	21	13	10
(China) Deng X	21	13	18
(China) Suo D	17	21	21

Fourth round
(England) S Milne	10	9
(China) Suo D	21	21
