= 2013 BWF Grand Prix Gold and Grand Prix =

The 2013 BWF Grand Prix Gold and Grand Prix was the seventh season of the BWF Grand Prix Gold and Grand Prix.

== Schedule ==
Below is the schedule released by Badminton World Federation:

Tour	Official title	Venue	City	Date		Prize money USD	Report
Tour	Official title	Venue	City	Start	Finish	Prize money USD	Report
1	(Germany) German Open Grand Prix Gold	RWE-Sporthalle	Mülheim	February 26	March 3	120,000	Report
2	(Switzerland) Swiss Open Grand Prix Gold	St. Jakobshalle	Basel	March 12	March 17	125,000	Report
3	(Australia) Australian Open Grand Prix Gold	Sydney Convention and Exhibition Centre	Sydney	April 2	April 7	120,000	Report
4	New Zealand Open Grand Prix	North Shore Events Centre	Auckland	April 10	April 14	50,000	Report
5	Malaysia Open Grand Prix Gold	Juara Indoor Stadium	Kuala Lumpur	April 30	May 4	120,000	Report
6	Thailand Open Grand Prix Gold	Nimibutr Stadium	Bangkok	June 4	June 9	120,000	Report
7	(United States) U.S. Open Grand Prix Gold	Orange County Badminton Club	Orange	July 8	July 13	120,000	Report
8	Canada Open Grand Prix	Richmond Olympic Oval	Richmond	July 16	July 21	50,000	Report
9	Chinese Taipei Open Grand Prix Gold	Hsing Chuang Gymnasium	Taipei	September 3	September 8	200,000	Report
10	Indonesia Open Grand Prix Gold	GOR Among Rogo	Yogyakarta	September 24	September 29	120,000	Report
11	Russia Open Grand Prix	Sports Hall Olympic	Vladivostok	September 24	September 29	50,000	Report
12	(England) London Grand Prix Gold	Copper Box	London	October 1	October 6	120,000	Report
13	(Netherlands) Dutch Open Grand Prix	Topsportcentrum	Almere	October 8	October 13	50,000	Report
14	(Germany) Bitburger Open Grand Prix Gold	Saarlandhalle	Saarbrücken	October 29	November 3	120,000	Report
15	(South Korea) Korea Open Grand Prix Gold	Jeonju Indoor Badminton Court	Jeonju	November 5	November 10	120,000	Report
16	(Scotland) Scottish Open Grand Prix	Commonwealth Arena and Sir Chris Hoy Velodrome	Glasgow	November 20	November 24	50,000	Report
17	Macau Open Grand Prix Gold	Macau Forum	Macau	November 26	December 1	120,000	Report
18	Vietnam Open Grand Prix	Phan Dinh Phung Stadium	Ho Chi Minh City	December 2	December 8	50,000	Report

Grand Prix Gold

== Results ==
=== Winners ===
Tour	Men's singles	Women's singles	Men's doubles	Women's doubles	Mixed doubles
German	(China) Chen Long	(China) Wang Yihan	(China) Chai Biao (China) Hong Wei	(South Korea) Jung Kyung-eun (South Korea) Kim Ha-na	(South Korea) Shin Baek-cheol (South Korea) Jang Ye-na
Swiss	(China) Wang Zhengming	(China) Wang Shixian	(China) Chai Biao (China) Hong Wei	(South Korea) Jung Kyung-eun (South Korea) Kim Ha-na	(Denmark) Joachim Fischer Nielsen (Denmark) Christinna Pedersen
Australia	(China) Tian Houwei	(Japan) Sayaka Takahashi	(Indonesia) Angga Pratama (Indonesia) Rian Agung Saputro	(Indonesia) Vita Marissa (Indonesia) Variella Aprilsasi	(Indonesia) Irfan Fadhilah (Indonesia) Weni Anggraini
New Zealand	(Japan) Riichi Takeshita	(China) Deng Xuan	(Indonesia) Angga Pratama (Indonesia) Rian Agung Saputro	(China) Ou Dongni (China) Tang Yuanting	(Indonesia) Praveen Jordan (Indonesia) Vita Marissa
Malaysia	(Indonesia) Alamsyah Yunus	(India) Pusarla Venkata Sindhu	(Malaysia) Goh V Shem (Malaysia) Lim Khim Wah	(Indonesia) Pia Zebadiah (Indonesia) Rizki Amelia Pradipta	(Indonesia) Praveen Jordan (Indonesia) Vita Marissa
Thailand	(India) Srikanth Kidambi	(Thailand) Ratchanok Inthanon	(South Korea) Shin Baek-cheol (South Korea) Yoo Yeon-seong	(Indonesia) Greysia Polii (Indonesia) Nitya Krishinda Maheswari	(Indonesia) Markis Kido (Indonesia) Pia Zebadiah
U.S.	(Vietnam) Nguyen Tien Minh	(Thailand) Sapsiree Taerattanachai	(Japan) Takeshi Kamura (Japan) Keigo Sonoda	(China) Bao Yixin (China) Zhong Qianxin	(Hong Kong) Lee Chun Hei (Hong Kong) Chau Hoi Wah
Canada	(Malaysia) Tan Chun Seang	(Thailand) Nichaon Jindapon	(Thailand) Maneepong Jongjit (Thailand) Nipitphon Puangpuapech	(China) Huang Yaqiong (China) Yu Xiaohan	(Hong Kong) Lee Chun Hei (Hong Kong) Chau Hoi Wah
Chinese Taipei	(South Korea) Shon Wan-ho	(South Korea) Sung Ji-hyun	(South Korea) Kim Ki-jung (South Korea) Kim Sa-rang	(South Korea) Jung Kyung-eun (South Korea) Kim Ha-na	(South Korea) Shin Baek-cheol (South Korea) Jang Ye-na
Indonesia	(Indonesia) Simon Santoso	(China) Suo Di	(Indonesia) Angga Pratama (Indonesia) Rian Agung Saputro	(China) Luo Ying (China) Luo Yu	(Indonesia) Praveen Jordan (Indonesia) Vita Marissa
Russia	(Russia) Vladimir Ivanov	(Japan) Aya Ohori	(Russia) Vladimir Ivanov (Russia) Ivan Sozonov	(Russia) Nina Vislova (Russia) Anastasia Chervaykova	(Russia) Ivan Sozonov (Russia) Tatjana Bibik
London	(China) Tian Houwei	(Spain) Carolina Marín	(Denmark) Mathias Boe (Denmark) Carsten Mogensen	(Denmark) Christinna Pedersen (Denmark) Kamilla Rytter Juhl	(Germany) Michael Fuchs (Germany) Birgit Michels
Dutch	(Hong Kong) Wei Nan	(Thailand) Busanan Ongbumrungpan	(Indonesia) Wahyu Nayaka (Indonesia) Ade Yusuf	(China) Bao Yixin (China) Tang Jinhua	(Singapore) Danny Bawa Chrisnanta (Singapore) Vanessa Neo Yu Yan
Bitburger	(Chinese Taipei) Chou Tien-chen	(Thailand) Nichaon Jindapon	(Denmark) Mads Conrad-Petersen (Denmark) Mads Pieler Kolding	(Netherlands) Eefje Muskens (Netherlands) Selena Piek	(Germany) Michael Fuchs (Germany) Birgit Michels
Korea	(South Korea) Lee Hyun-il	(South Korea) Bae Youn-joo	(South Korea) Kim Ki-jung (South Korea) Kim Sa-rang	(South Korea) Jang Ye-na (South Korea) Kim So-young	(South Korea) Yoo Yeon-seong (South Korea) Jang Ye-na
Scotland	(France) Brice Leverdez	(Spain) Carolina Marín	(Denmark) Mads Conrad-Petersen (Denmark) Mads Pieler Kolding	(Netherlands) Eefje Muskens (Netherlands) Selena Piek	(Scotland) Robert Blair (Scotland) Imogen Bankier
Macau	(South Korea) Shon Wan-ho	(India) Pusarla Venkata Sindhu	(Malaysia) Hoon Thien How (Malaysia) Tan Wee Kiong	(China) Bao Yixin (China) Tang Jinhua	(China) Lu Kai (China) Huang Yaqiong
Vietnam	(South Korea) Shon Wan-ho	(China) He Bingjiao	(Indonesia) Fran Kurniawan (Indonesia) Bona Septano	(South Korea) Go Ah-ra (South Korea) Yoo Hae-won	(South Korea) Choi Sol-gyu (South Korea) Chae Yoo-jung

=== Performance by countries ===
Tabulated below are the Grand Prix performances based on countries. Only countries who have won a title are listed:

Team	GER	SUI	AUS	NZL	MAS	THA	USA	CAN	TPE	INA	RUS	ENG	NED	GER	KOR	SCO	MAC	VIE	Total
China	3	3	1	2			1	1		2		1	1				2	1	18
Korea	2	1				1			5						5		1	3	18
Indonesia			3	2	3	2				3			1					1	15
Thailand						1	1	2					1	1					6
Denmark		1										2		1		1			5
Japan			1	1			1				1								4
Russia											4								4
Hongkong							1	1					1						3
India					1	1											1		3
Malaysia					1			1									1		3
Germany												1		1					2
Netherlands														1		1			2
Spain												1				1			2
Vietnam							1												1
Singapore													1						1
Chinese Taipei														1					1
France																1			1
Scotland																1			1

== Grand Prix Gold ==
=== German Open ===
Category	Winners	Runners-up	Score
Men's singles	(China) Chen Long	(Indonesia) Tommy Sugiarto	21–17, 21–11
Women's singles	(China) Wang Yihan	(Germany) Juliane Schenk	21–14, 21–13
Men's doubles	(China) Chai Biao / Hong Wei	(China) Liu Xiaolong / Qiu Zihan	21–10, 21–14
Women's doubles	(South Korea) Jung Kyung-eun / Kim Ha-na	(China) Ma Jin / Tang Jinhua	11–21, 21–14, 21–13
Mixed doubles	(South Korea) Shin Baek-cheol / Jang Ye-na	(Denmark) Anders Kristiansen / Julie Houmann	21–19, 19–21, 24–22

=== Swiss Open ===
Category	Winners	Runners-up	Score
Men's singles	(China) Wang Zhengming	(China) Du Pengyu	21–18, 21–18
Women's singles	(China) Wang Shixian	(Thailand) Ratchanok Inthanon	21–16, 21–12
Men's doubles	(China) Chai Biao / Hong Wei	(South Korea) Ko Sung-hyun / Lee Yong-dae	21–14, 18–21, 21–14
Women's doubles	(South Korea) Jung Kyung-eun / Kim Ha-na	(South Korea) Lee So-hee / Shin Seung-chan	23–21, 21–16
Mixed doubles	(Denmark) Joachim Fischer Nielsen / Christinna Pedersen	(China) Zhang Nan / Tang Jinhua	22–20, 21–19

=== Australia Open ===
Category	Winners	Runners-up	Score
Men's singles	(China) Tian Houwei	(China) Xue Song	20–22, 21–13, 21–12
Women's singles	(Japan) Sayaka Takahashi	(Thailand) Nichaon Jindapon	24–22, 21–10
Men's doubles	(Indonesia) Angga Pratama / Rian Agung Saputro	(Indonesia) Mohammad Ahsan / Hendra Setiawan	22–20, 21–19
Women's doubles	(Indonesia) Vita Marissa / Variella Aprilsasi	(Thailand) Savitree Amitrapai / Sapsiree Taerattanachai	21–19, 21–15
Mixed doubles	(Indonesia) Irfan Fadhilah / Weni Anggraini	(South Korea) Shin Baek-cheol / Jang Ye-na	21–14, 22–24, 21–16

=== Malaysia Grand Prix Gold ===
Category	Winners	Runners-up	Score
Men's singles	(Indonesia) Alamsyah Yunus	(Malaysia) Goh Soon Huat	10–21, 21–9, 21–19
Women's singles	(India) Pusarla Venkata Sindhu	(Singapore) Gu Juan	21–17, 17–21, 21–19
Men's doubles	(Malaysia) Goh V Shem / Lim Khim Wah	(Malaysia) Koo Kien Keat / Tan Boon Heong	22–20, 21–15
Women's doubles	(Indonesia) Pia Zebadiah / Rizki Amelia Pradipta	(Indonesia) Vita Marissa / Variella Aprilsasi	21–17, 16–21, 21–17
Mixed doubles	(Indonesia) Praveen Jordan / Vita Marissa	(Malaysia) Tan Aik Quan / Lai Pei Jing	20–22, 21–13, 21–17

=== Thailand Open ===
Category	Winners	Runners-up	Score
Men's singles	(India) Srikanth Kidambi	(Thailand) Boonsak Ponsana	21–16, 21–12
Women's singles	(Thailand) Ratchanok Inthanon	(Thailand) Busanan Ongbumrungpan	20–22, 21–19, 21–13
Men's doubles	(South Korea) Shin Baek-cheol / Yoo Yeon-seong	(Russia) Vladimir Ivanov / Ivan Sozonov	18–21, 21–15, 21–14
Women's doubles	(Indonesia) Greysia Polii / Nitya Krishinda Maheswari	(Japan) Yuriko Miki / Koharu Yonemoto	21–7, 21–13
Mixed doubles	(Indonesia) Markis Kido / Pia Zebadiah	(Indonesia) Riky Widianto / Richi Puspita Dili	18–21, 21–15, 21–15

=== U.S. Open ===
Category	Winners	Runners-up	Score
Men's singles	(Vietnam) Nguyen Tien Minh	(Hong Kong) Wong Wing Ki	18–21, 21–17, 21–18
Women's singles	(Thailand) Sapsiree Taerattanachai	(Japan) Yuka Kusunose	21–12, 21–13
Men's doubles	(Japan) Takeshi Kamura / Keigo Sonoda	(Chinese Taipei) Liang Jui-wei / Liao Kuan-hao	21–16, 27–25
Women's doubles	(China) Bao Yixin / Zhong Qianxin	(China) Huang Yaqiong / Yu Xiaohan	21–17, 24–22
Mixed doubles	(Hong Kong) Lee Chun Hei / Chau Hoi Wah	(China) Wang Yilu / Huang Yaqiong	21–8, 21–14

=== Chinese Taipei Open ===
Category	Winners	Runners-up	Score
Men's singles	(South Korea) Shon Wan-ho	(Vietnam) Nguyen Tien Minh	19–21, 21–9, 21–18
Women's singles	(South Korea) Sung Ji-hyun	(Chinese Taipei) Tai Tzu-ying	21–16, 21–9
Men's doubles	(South Korea) Kim Ki-jung / Kim Sa-rang	(Chinese Taipei) Lee Sheng-mu / Tsai Chia-hsin	21–11, 21–11
Women's doubles	(South Korea) Jung Kyung-eun / Kim Ha-na	(South Korea) Lee So-hee / Shin Seung-chan	walkover
Mixed doubles	(South Korea) Shin Baek-cheol / Jang Ye-na	(South Korea) Yoo Yeon-seong / Eom Hye-won	22–20, 12–21, 21–16

=== Indonesia Open ===
Category	Winners	Runners-up	Score
Men's singles	(Indonesia) Simon Santoso	(Indonesia) Dionysius Hayom Rumbaka	21–17, 21–11
Women's singles	(China) Suo Di	(China) Yao Xue	21–12, 22–20
Men's doubles	(Indonesia) Angga Pratama / Rian Agung Saputro	(Indonesia) Ronald Alexander / Selvanus Geh	17–21, 21–15, 21–16
Women's doubles	(China) Luo Ying / Luo Yu	(China) Huang Dongping / Jia Yifan	19–21, 21–15, 21–18
Mixed doubles	(Indonesia) Praveen Jordan / Vita Marissa	(Indonesia) Tontowi Ahmad / Lilyana Natsir	22–20, 9–21, 21–14

=== London Open ===
Category	Winners	Runners-up	Score
Men's singles	(China) Tian Houwei	(Denmark) Hans-Kristian Vittinghus	22–20, 21–16
Women's singles	(Spain) Carolina Marín	(Scotland) Kirsty Gilmour	21–19, 21–9
Men's doubles	(Denmark) Mathias Boe / Carsten Mogensen	(Indonesia) Berry Angriawan / Ricky Karanda Suwardi	21–13, 21–16
Women's doubles	(Denmark) Christinna Pedersen / Kamilla Rytter Juhl	(Denmark) Line Damkjaer Kruse / Marie Roepke	12–21, 21–17, 21–15
Mixed doubles	(Germany) Michael Fuchs / Birgit Michels	(England) Chris Langridge / Heather Olver	21–19, 21–14

=== Bitburger Open ===
Category	Winners	Runners-up	Score
Men's singles	(Chinese Taipei) Chou Tien-chen	(Germany) Marc Zwiebler	13–21, 21–18, 21–15
Women's singles	(Thailand) Nichaon Jindapon	(Bulgaria) Linda Zechiri	21–13, 21–13
Men's doubles	(Denmark) Mads Conrad-Petersen / Mads Pieler Kolding	(Denmark) Anders Skaarup Rasmussen / Kim Astrup Sorensen	21–11, 21–16
Women's doubles	(Netherlands) Eefje Muskens / Selena Piek	(Malaysia) Ng Hui Ern / Ng Hui Lin	22–20, 21–15
Mixed doubles	(Germany) Michael Fuchs / Birgit Michels	(England) Chris Adcock / Gabrielle White	21–19, 21–15

=== Korea Grand Prix Gold ===
Category	Winners	Runners-up	Score
Men's singles	(South Korea) Lee Hyun-il	(South Korea) Hong Ji-hoon	21–18, 21–12
Women's singles	(South Korea) Bae Youn-joo	(South Korea) Sung Ji-hyun	21–19, 15–21, 21–9
Men's doubles	(South Korea) Kim Ki-jung / Kim Sa-rang	(South Korea) Ko Sung-hyun / Shin Baek-cheol	21–15, 18–21, 25–23
Women's doubles	(South Korea) Jang Ye-na / Kim So-young	(South Korea) Go Ah-ra / Yoo Hae-won	21–15, 21–12
Mixed doubles	(South Korea) Yoo Yeon-seong / Jang Ye-na	(South Korea) Kang Ji-wook / Choi Hye-in	21–13, 21–11

=== Macau Open ===
Category	Winners	Runners-up	Score
Men's singles	(South Korea) Shon Wan-ho	(Chinese Taipei) Hsueh Hsuan-yi	21–11, 21–15
Women's singles	(India) Pusarla Venkata Sindhu	(Canada) Michelle Li	21–15, 21–12
Men's doubles	(Malaysia) Hoon Thien How / Tan Wee Kiong	(Chinese Taipei) Lee Sheng-mu / Tsai Chia-hsin	21–16, 21–19
Women's doubles	(China) Bao Yixin / Tang Jinhua	(China) Huang Yaqiong / Yu Xiaohan	21–17, 21–15
Mixed doubles	(China) Lu Kai / Huang Yaqiong	(South Korea) Choi Sol-gyu / Chae Yoo-jung	17–21, 21–18, 21–17

== Grand Prix ==
=== New Zealand Open ===
Category	Winners	Runners-up	Score
Men's singles	(Japan) Riichi Takeshita	(China) Xue Song	21–16, 16–21, 21–17
Women's singles	(China) Deng Xuan	(Japan) Akane Yamaguchi	21–17, 18–21, 22–20
Men's doubles	(Indonesia) Angga Pratama / Rian Agung Saputro	(China) Li Junhui / Liu Yuchen	21–6, 22–20
Women's doubles	(China) Ou Dongni / Tang Yuanting	(Malaysia) Vivian Hoo Kah Mun / Woon Khe Wei	21–15, 11–21, 21–19
Mixed doubles	(Indonesia) Praveen Jordan / Vita Marissa	(Indonesia) Riky Widianto / Richi Puspita Dili	21–18, 21–8

=== Canada Open ===
Category	Winners	Runners-up	Score
Men's singles	(Malaysia) Tan Chun Seang	(Netherlands) Eric Pang	15–21, 21–11, 21–16
Women's singles	(Thailand) Nichaon Jindapon	(Hong Kong) Yip Pui Yin	21–18, 21–16
Men's doubles	(Thailand) Maneepong Jongjit / Nipitphon Puangpuapech	(Thailand) Bodin Issara / Pakkawat Vilailak	21–12, DSQ
Women's doubles	(China) Huang Yaqiong / Yu Xiaohan	(Netherlands) Eefje Muskens / Selena Piek	13–21, 21–11, 21–13
Mixed doubles	(Hong Kong) Lee Chun Hei / Chau Hoi Wah	(Netherlands) Jorrit de Ruiter / Samantha Barning	21–13, 21–10

=== Russia Open ===
Category	Winners	Runners-up	Score
Men's singles	(Russia) Vladimir Ivanov	(Japan) Kenta Nishimoto	21–17, 15–21, 21–14
Women's singles	(Japan) Aya Ohori	(Russia) Ksenia Polikarpova	21–5, 21–10
Men's doubles	(Russia) Vladimir Ivanov / Ivan Sozonov	(Russia) Andrej Ashmarin / Vitalij Durkin	21–16, 21–19
Women's doubles	(Russia) Nina Vislova / Anastasia Chervaykova	(Russia) Irina Khlebko / Ksenia Polikarpova	21–16, 21–18
Mixed doubles	(Russia) Ivan Sozonov / Tatjana Bibik	(Russia) Vitalij Durkin / Nina Vislova	21–17, 24–22

=== Dutch Open ===
Category	Winners	Runners-up	Score
Men's singles	(Hong Kong) Wei Nan	(Hong Kong) Chan Yan Kit	21–15, 21–18
Women's singles	(Thailand) Busanan Ongbumrungpan	(Singapore) Gu Juan	21–12, 21–12
Men's doubles	(Indonesia) Wahyu Nayaka / Ade Yusuf	(Indonesia) Berry Angriawan / Ricky Karanda Suwardi	14–21, 21–18, 21–17
Women's doubles	(China) Bao Yixin / Tang Jinhua	(Indonesia) Anggia Shitta Awanda / Della Destiara Haris	21–15, 21–7
Mixed doubles	(Singapore) Danny Bawa Chrisnanta / Vanessa Neo Yu Yan	(Indonesia) Muhammad Rijal / Debby Susanto	21–19, 25–23

=== Scottish Open ===
Category	Winners	Runners-up	Score
Men's singles	(France) Brice Leverdez	(Sweden) Henri Hurskainen	21–8, 16–21, 21–16
Women's singles	(Spain) Carolina Marín	(Scotland) Kirsty Gilmour	21–14, 11–21, 21–13
Men's doubles	(Denmark) Mads Conrad-Petersen / Mads Pieler Kolding	(Denmark) Anders Skaarup Rasmussen / Kim Astrup Sorensen	walkover
Women's doubles	(Netherlands) Eefje Muskens / Selena Piek	(Malaysia) Ng Hui Ern / Ng Hui Lin	25–23, 15–21, 21–16
Mixed doubles	(Scotland) Robert Blair / Imogen Bankier	(England) Chris Langridge / Heather Olver	21–16, 21–14

=== Vietnam Open ===
Category	Winners	Runners-up	Score
Men's singles	(South Korea) Shon Wan-ho	(Malaysia) Tan Chun Seang	21–14, 21–9
Women's singles	(China) He Bingjiao	(Indonesia) Hera Desi	21–10, 21–6
Men's doubles	(Indonesia) Fran Kurniawan / Bona Septano	(Chinese Taipei) Lin Chia-yu / Wu Hsiao-lin	18–21, 21–18, 21–18
Women's doubles	(South Korea) Go Ah-ra / Yoo Hae-won	(Malaysia) Amelia Alicia Anscelly / Soong Fie Cho	12–21, 21–10, 21–9
Mixed doubles	(South Korea) Choi Sol-gyu / Chae Yoo-jung	(Chinese Taipei) Liao Min-chun / Chen Hsiao-huan	22–20, 19–21, 21–14
