= Porntip Buranaprasertsuk =

Thai badminton player (born 1991)

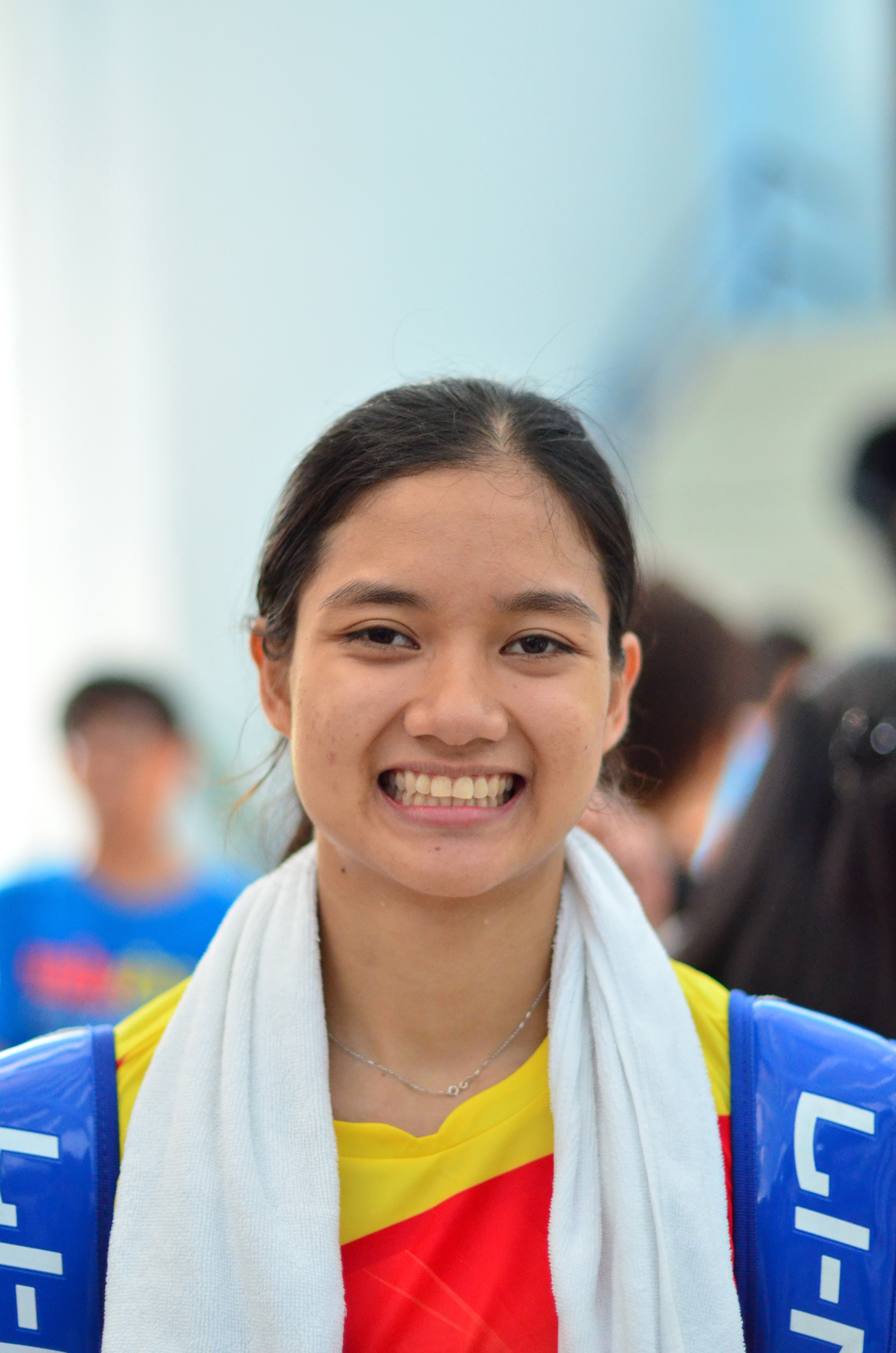

Personal information
- Born: 24 October 1991 (age 35) Bangkok, Thailand
- Height: 1.67 m (5 ft 6 in)
- Weight: 61 kg (134 lb)

Sport
- Country: Thailand
- Sport: Badminton

Women's singles
- Highest ranking: 8 (19 June 2014)
- BWF profile
Medal record
Women's badminton
Representing Thailand
Sudirman Cup
Bronze medal – third place	2013 Kuala Lumpur	Mixed team
Uber Cup
Bronze medal – third place	2012 Wuhan	Women's team
Asian Games
Silver medal – second place	2010 Guangzhou	Women's team
Asia Team Championships
Silver medal – second place	2016 Hyderabad	Women's team
SEA Games
Gold medal – first place	2011 Jakarta–Palembang	Women's team
Gold medal – first place	2015 Singapore	Women's team
Bronze medal – third place	2007 Nakhon Ratchasima	Women's team
Bronze medal – third place	2009 Vientiane	Women's team
Bronze medal – third place	2011 Jakarta–Palembang	Women's singles
Summer Universiade
Silver medal – second place	2015 Gwangju	Women's singles
Bronze medal – third place	2013 Kazan	Mixed team
Bronze medal – third place	2013 Kazan	Women's singles
Bronze medal – third place	2015 Gwangju	Mixed team
World Junior Championships
Silver medal – second place	2009 Alor Setar	Girls' singles
Bronze medal – third place	2008 Pune	Girls' singles
Bronze medal – third place	2009 Alor Setar	Mixed team
Asian Junior Championships
Bronze medal – third place	2008 Kuala Lumpur	Girls' singles
Bronze medal – third place	2009 Kuala Lumpur	Mixed team

Porntip Buranaprasertsuk (Thai: พรทิพย์ บูรณะประเสริฐสุข; born 24 October 1991) is a Thai badminton player. Buranaprasertsuk won her first Superseries title in 2011 India Open on 1 May 2011, becoming the first Thai to win a women's singles title in the Superseries tournament. She competed at the 2010, 2014 Asian Games, also in four consecutive SEA Games, and was part of the team that won the women's team gold medals in 2011 and 2015 SEA Games.

== Achievement ==
=== SEA Games ===
Women's singles
Year	Venue	Opponent	Score	Result
2011	Istora Senayan, Jakarta, Indonesia	(Indonesia) Adriyanti Firdasari	15–21, 21–14, 15–21	Bronze

=== Summer Universiade ===
Women's singles
Year	Venue	Opponent	Score	Result
2013	Tennis Academy, Kazan, Russia	(Chinese Taipei) Tai Tzu-ying	17–21, 21–9, 11–21	Bronze
2015	Hwasun Hanium Culture Sports Center, Hwasun, South Korea	(South Korea) Sung Ji-hyun	18–21, 19–21	Silver

=== BWF World Junior Championships ===
Girls' singles
Year	Venue	Opponent	Score	Result
2008	Shree Shiv Chhatrapati Badminton Hall, Pune, India	(Japan) Sayaka Sato	17–21, 16–21	Bronze
2009	Stadium Sultan Abdul Halim, Alor Setar, Malaysia	(Thailand) Ratchanok Intanon	15–21, 23–21, 10–21	Silver

=== Asian Junior Championships ===
Girls' singles
Year	Venue	Opponent	Score	Result
2008	Stadium Juara, Kuala Lumpur, Malaysia	(China) Wang Shixian	14–21, 21–10, 11–21	Bronze

=== BWF World Tour (1 runner-up) ===
The BWF World Tour, which was announced on 19 March 2017 and implemented in 2018, is a series of elite badminton tournaments sanctioned by the Badminton World Federation (BWF). The BWF World Tours are divided into levels of World Tour Finals, Super 1000, Super 750, Super 500, Super 300 (part of the HSBC World Tour), and the BWF Tour Super 100.

Women's singles
Year	Tournament	Level	Opponent	Score	Result
2019	Indonesia Masters	Super 100	(China) Wang Zhiyi	22–20, 15–21, 13–21	(silver) Runner-up

=== BWF Super Series (1 title, 2 runners-up) ===
The BWF Superseries, which was launched on 14 December 2006 and implemented in 2007, is a series of elite badminton tournaments, sanctioned by the Badminton World Federation (BWF). BWF Superseries levels are Superseries and Superseries Premier. A season of Superseries consists of twelve tournaments around the world that have been introduced since 2011. Successful players are invited to the Superseries Finals, which are held at the end of each year.

Women's singles
Year	Tournament	Opponent	Score	Result
2011	India Open	(South Korea) Bae Yeon-ju	21–13, 21–16	(gold) Winner
2013	China Masters	(China) Liu Xin	4–21, 21–13, 12–21	(silver) Runner-up
2013	French Open	(China) Wang Shixian	18–21, 18–21	(silver) Runner-up

BWF Super Series Finals tournament
BWF Super Series Premier tournament
BWF Super Series tournament

=== BWF Grand Prix (1 title, 1 runner-up) ===
The BWF Grand Prix had two levels, the BWF Grand Prix and Grand Prix Gold. It was a series of badminton tournaments sanctioned by the Badminton World Federation (BWF) which was held from 2007 to 2017.

Women's singles
Year	Tournament	Opponent	Score	Result
2011	India Grand Prix Gold	(Thailand) Ratchanok Intanon	Walkover	(silver) Runner-up
2012	Vietnam Open	(Indonesia) Lindaweni Fanetri	21–10, 21–18	(gold) Winner

BWF Grand Prix Gold tournament
BWF Grand Prix tournament

=== BWF International Challenge/Series (11 titles, 2 runners-up) ===
Women's singles
Year	Tournament	Opponent	Score	Result
2007	Malaysia International	(Malaysia) Julia Wong Pei Xian	21–11, 21–19	(gold) Winner
2008	Smiling Fish International	(Japan) Megumi Taruno	21–17, 21–23, 21–18	(gold) Winner
2008	Singapore International	(Indonesia) Yuan Kartika Putri	21–18, 16–21, 21–16	(gold) Winner
2009	Smiling Fish International	(Thailand) Chanida Julrattanamanee	23–21, 21–14	(gold) Winner
2018	Hellas International	(Turkey) Cemre Fere	21–13, 21–9	(gold) Winner
2019	Austrian Open	(China) Wang Zhiyi	18–21, 10–21	(silver) Runner-up
2019	Slovak Open	(Wales) Jordan Hart	21–17, 21–17	(gold) Winner
2019	Portugal International	(Chinese Taipei) Hung En-tzu	21–12, 19–21, 21–11	(gold) Winner
2019	Finnish Open	(Denmark) Julie Dawall Jakobsen	18–21, 21–23	(silver) Runner-up
2019	Nepal International	(South Korea) Park Ga-eun	21–16, 21–14	(gold) Winner
2019	India International	(Thailand) Benyapa Aimsaard	21–18, 21–11	(gold) Winner

Women's doubles
Year	Tournament	Partner	Opponent	Score	Result
2009	Smiling Fish International	(Thailand) Sapsiree Taerattanachai	(India) P. C. Thulasi (India) N. Sikki Reddy	21–19, 21–17	(gold) Winner
2018	Hellas International	(Belarus) Kristina Silich	(England) Abigail Holden (England) Fee Teng Liew	21–9, 21–19	(gold) Winner

BWF International Challenge tournament
BWF International Series tournament
BWF Future Series tournament

== Performance timeline ==
Key

W	F	SF	QF	#R	RR	Q#	A	G	S	B	NH	N/A	DNQ

(W) won; (F) finalist; (SF) semi-finalist; (QF) quarter-finalist; (#R) rounds 4, 3, 2, 1; (RR) round-robin stage; (Q#) qualification round; (A) absent; (G) gold, (S) silver or (B) bronze medal; (NH) not held; (N/A) not applicable; (DNQ) did not qualify.
To avoid confusion and double counting, these charts are updated at the conclusion of a tournament or when the player's participation has ended.

Event	2008	2009	2010	2011	2012	2013	2014	2015	2016
SEA Games	—N/a	A	—N/a	Bronze	—N/a	A	—N/a	A	—N/a
Asian Championships	2R (WS); 2R (WD)	2R	1R	QF	1R	A	2R	A	1R
Asian Games	—N/a		2R	—N/a			A	—N/a	
World Championships	—N/a	2R	2R	3R	—N/a	3R	2R	3R	—N/a
Olympic Games	DNQ	—N/a			DNQ	—N/a			QF

Year	2009	2010	2011	2012	2013	2014	2015	2016	2017	2018	2019	2020	Best
Tournament	BWF Superseries									BWF World Tour			Best
Korea Open	A		SF	1R	QF	1R	1R	A		1R	A	—N/a	SF (2011)
Malaysia Open	1R	A		1R	1R	1R	2R	QF	A			—N/a	QF (2016)
All England Open	Q1	A	1R	1R	2R	2R	2R	2R	A				2R (2013, 2014, 2015, 2016)
Swiss Open	1R	A		1R	A		QF	QF	A			—N/a	QF (2015, 2016)
India Open	GPG		W	1R	A	1R	A	2R	A			—N/a	W (2011)
Indonesia Open	2R	1R	1R	2R	1R	1R	1R	A				—N/a	2R (2009, 2012)
Singapore Open	1R	QF	1R	QF	1R	1R	1R	QF	A	1R	A	—N/a	QF (2010, 2012, 2016)
Fuzhou China Open	1R	1R	A	2R	F	A		SF	A			—N/a	F (2013)
Japan Open	2R	2R	1R	SF	2R	QF	1R	1R	A			—N/a	SF (2012)
Denmark Open	A	1R	1R	2R	1R	1R	1R	2R	A				2R (2012, 2016)
French Open	A	SF	SF	2R	F	2R	1R	1R	A			—N/a	F (2013)
China Open	1R	1R	2R	1R	SF	1R	A	2R	A			—N/a	SF (2013)
Hong Kong Open	1R	2R	A	QF	SF	2R	QF	1R	1R	A		—N/a	SF (2013)
Australian Open	A		F	QF	A	1R	1R	A				—N/a	F (2011)
BWF Superseries/World Tour Finals	GS	DNQ			GS	DNQ							GS (2009, 2013)
Year-end Ranking	36	25	12	13	10	26	22	12	328	81	35	39	8
Year	2009	2010	2011	2012	2013	2014	2015	2016	2017	2018	2019	2020	Best

Year	2006	2007	2008	2009	2010	2011	2012	2013	2014	2015	2016	2017	2018	2019	2020	Best
Tournament	IBF World Grand Prix/BWF Grand Prix Gold and Grand Prix												BWF World Tour			Best
Malaysia Masters	—N/a			1R (WS); 1R (WD)	2R	2R	A			QF	A				1R	QF (2015)
Indonesia Masters	—N/a				A						—N/a	A			1R	1R (2020)
Thailand Masters	—N/a										QF	A		QF	1R	QF (2016, 2019)
German Open	A					1R	2R	1R	1R	1R	1R	A			—N/a	2R (2012)
Orléans Masters	—N/a						IC/IS						A	2R	—N/a	2R (2019)
Canada Open	IC/IS		—N/a		A									QF	—N/a	QF (2019)
U.S. Open	A					QF	A							2R	—N/a	QF (2011)
Thailand Open	1R	1R	QF	2R	—N/a	SF	SF	QF (WS); SF (WD)	—N/a	2R	2R	A		1R	A	SF (2011, 2012, 2013)
Vietnam Open	w/d	A	w/d	A			W (WS); SF (WD)	A		QF	A		2R	A	—N/a	W (2012)
Chinese Taipei Open	A		QF	1R	1R	A		QF	A	2R	1R	A	1R	A	—N/a	QF (2008, 2013)
Bitburger Open	A									2R	SF	A				SF (2016)
Hyderabad Open	—N/a												A	SF	—N/a	SF (2019)
Akita Masters	—N/a												SF	A	—N/a	SF (2018)
Indonesia Masters Super 100	—N/a												A	F	—N/a	F (2019)
London Grand Prix Gold	—N/a							1R (WS); 2R (WD)	—N/a							2R (2013)
Dutch Open	A					SF	A	QF (WS); 2R (WD)	A						—N/a	SF (2011)
Macau Open	A	1R	1R	A	QF	2R	A							1R	—N/a	QF (2010)
Syed Modi International	—N/a			A		F	A	—N/a	A	QF	SF	A		2R	—N/a	F (2011)
U.S. Open Grand Prix	—N/a								A	QF	IC/IS				—N/a	QF (2015)
Mexico City Grand Prix	—N/a									SF	—N/a					SF (2015)
Year-end Ranking				36	25	12	13	10	26	22	12	328	81	35	39	8
Year	2006	2007	2008	2009	2010	2011	2012	2013	2014	2015	2016	2017	2018	2019	2020	Best

== Record against selected opponents ==
Record against year-end Finals finalists, World Championships semi-finalists, and Olympic quarter-finalists. Last updated as on 17 March 2020.

Players	Matches	Results		Difference
Players	Matches	Won	Lost	Difference
(Bulgaria) Petya Nedelcheva	1	1	0	+1
(China) He Bingjiao	2	0	2	–2
(China) Li Xuerui	13	3	10	–7
(China) Lu Lan	2	0	2	–2
(China) Wang Lin	3	1	2	–1
(China) Wang Shixian	10	1	9	–8
(China) Wang Yihan	7	2	5	–3
(China) Zhu Lin	1	0	1	–1
(Chinese Taipei) Cheng Shao-chieh	3	1	2	–1
(Chinese Taipei) Tai Tzu-ying	9	4	5	–1
(Denmark) Tine Baun	3	1	2	–1
(France) Pi Hongyan	2	0	2	–2
(Germany) Juliane Schenk	3	1	2	–1
(Germany) Xu Huaiwen	1	0	1	–1
(Hong Kong) Wang Chen	1	0	1	–1

Players	Matches	Results		Difference
Players	Matches	Won	Lost	Difference
(Hong Kong) Yip Pui Yin	7	4	3	+1
(Hong Kong) Zhou Mi	2	0	2	–2
(India) Saina Nehwal	12	2	10	–8
(India) P. V. Sindhu	10	4	6	–2
(Indonesia) Lindaweni Fanetri	5	4	1	+3
(Indonesia) Maria Kristin Yulianti	1	0	1	–1
(Japan) Minatsu Mitani	7	3	4	–1
(Japan) Nozomi Okuhara	5	4	1	+3
(Japan) Akane Yamaguchi	2	0	2	–2
(Malaysia) Wong Mew Choo	2	0	2	–2
(South Korea) An Se-young	2	0	2	–2
(South Korea) Bae Yeon-ju	7	2	5	–3
(South Korea) Sung Ji-hyun	12	3	9	–6
(Spain) Carolina Marín	3	1	2	–1
(Thailand) Ratchanok Intanon	3	0	3	–3
