= 2013 Indonesian Masters Grand Prix Gold =

Tournament details
- Dates: 24 September 2013 – 29 September 2013
- Edition: 4th
- Total prize money: US$120,000
- Venue: GOR Among Rogo
- Location: Yogyakarta, Indonesia

Champions
- Men's singles: (Indonesia) Simon Santoso
- Women's singles: (China) Suo Di
- Men's doubles: (Indonesia) Angga Pratama (Indonesia) Rian Agung Saputro
- Women's doubles: (China) Luo Ying (China) Luo Yu
- Mixed doubles: (Indonesia) Praveen Jordan (Indonesia) Vita Marissa

The 2013 Indonesian Masters Grand Prix Gold (officially known as the Yonex Sunrise Indonesia Open 2013 for sponsorship reasons) was the tenth grand prix gold and grand prix tournament of the 2013 BWF Grand Prix Gold and Grand Prix. The tournament was held in GOR Among Rogo, Yogyakarta, Indonesia September 24 until September 29, 2013 and had a total purse of $120,000.

== Men's singles ==
=== Seeds ===
1. (Indonesia) Tommy Sugiarto (semi-final)
2. (Indonesia) Sony Dwi Kuncoro (semi-final)
3. (Indonesia) Dionysius Hayom Rumbaka (final)
4. (Malaysia) Mohd Arif Abdul Latif (second round)
5. (Indonesia) Alamsyah Yunus (third round)
6. (Singapore) Derek Wong Zi Liang (quarter-final)
7. (Thailand) Suppanyu Avihingsanon (quarter-final)
8. (Indonesia) Wisnu Yuli Prasetyo (quarter-final)
9. (Malaysia) Iskandar Zulkarnain Zainuddin (third round)
10. (Singapore) Ashton Chen Yong Zhao (third round)
11. (Indonesia) Simon Santoso (champion)
12. (Malaysia) Goh Soon Huat (second round)
13. (Indonesia) Riyanto Subagja (second round)
14. (Hong Kong) Ng Ka Long (second round)
15. (Singapore) Robin Gonansa (third round)
16. (Malaysia) Loh Wei Sheng (third round)

=== Finals ===
Quarterfinals
1	(Indonesia) Tommy Sugiarto	21	21
6	(Singapore) Derek Wong Zi Liang	14	19
(Indonesia) Jonatan Christie	13	9
11	(Indonesia) Simon Santoso	21	21
8	(Indonesia) Wisnu Yuli Prasetyo	15	18
3	(Indonesia) D Hayom Rumbaka	21	21
7	(Thailand) Suppanyu Avihingsanon	21	11	13
2	(Indonesia) Sony Dwi Kuncoro	15	21	21

Semifinals
1	(Indonesia) Tommy Sugiarto	14	21	17
11	(Indonesia) Simon Santoso	21	13	21
3	(Indonesia) D Hayom Rumbaka
2	(Indonesia) Sony Dwi Kuncoro	wo

Final
11	(Indonesia) Simon Santoso	21	21
3	(Indonesia) D Hayom Rumbaka	17	11

=== Top half ===
==== Section 1 ====
First Round
1	(Indonesia) T Sugiarto	21	21
(Singapore) S Lee	6	10
(Philippines) M Alcala	22	21
(Indonesia) K Alexander	20	19
12	(Malaysia) Goh SH	21	21
(Indonesia) R Ivanudin	15	15
(Indonesia) R Megananda	21	21
Q4	(Indonesia) V Anindita	7	11

Second Round
1	(Indonesia) T Sugiarto	21	21
(Philippines) M Alcala	17	11
12	(Malaysia) Goh SH	18	9^{r}
(Indonesia) R Megananda	21	15

Third Round
1	(Indonesia) T Sugiarto	21	21
(Indonesia) R Megananda	16	11

==== Section 2 ====
First Round
6	(Singapore) D Wong	17	21	21
(Indonesia) A Ramadhan	21	11	17
(Thailand) P Thongnuam	21	19	21
(Indonesia) P Sudrajat	8	21	11
15	(Singapore) R Gonansa	21	18	21
(Indonesia) S Setia Putra	14	21	18
Q8	(Indonesia) N Saputro	19	11
PFQ	(Indonesia) A Januari	21	21

Second Round
6	(Singapore) D Wong	16	21	21
(Thailand) P Thongnuam	21	18	13
15	(Singapore) R Gonansa	21	21
PFQ	(Indonesia) A Januari	10	16

Third Round
6	(Singapore) D Wong	21	21
15	(Singapore) R Gonansa	15	18

==== Section 3 ====
First Round
4	(Malaysia) A Abdul Latif	19	21	21
(Indonesia) A Susanto	21	14	10
Q5	(Indonesia) C Briand	12	7
(Indonesia) J Christie	21	21
13	(Indonesia) R Subagja	13	21	21
(Thailand) K Phetpradab	21	10	18
(Hong Kong) Tam CH	21	21
(Brazil) L Pinto	10	7

Second Round
4	(Malaysia) A Abdul Latif	16	21	18
(Indonesia) J Christie	21	18	21
13	(Indonesia) R Subagja	16	16
(Hong Kong) Tam CH	21	21

Third Round
(Indonesia) J Christie	21	13	21
(Hong Kong) Tam CH	9	21	10

==== Section 4 ====
First Round
5	(Indonesia) A Yunus	21	21
(Mexico) L Munoz	15	14
(Indonesia) K Wibowo	16	9
Q1	(Indonesia) B Pamungkas	21	21
11	(Indonesia) S Santoso	21	21
(India) S Verma	12	10
(Indonesia) T Mahbub	21	21
(Malaysia) Kuan BH	10	14

Second Round
5	(Indonesia) A Yunus	21	21
Q1	(Indonesia) B Pamungkas	18	10
11	(Indonesia) S Santoso	21	11	21
(Indonesia) T Mahbub	12	21	12

Third Round
5	(Indonesia) A Yunus	16	10
11	(Indonesia) S Santoso	21	21

=== Bottom half ===
==== Section 5 ====
First Round
(Indonesia) M Pangisthu	21	21
Q3	(Indonesia) E Mulyo	17	9
(Indonesia) G Adwitya	16	19
10	(Singapore) A Chen	21	21
(Indonesia) F Adnan	18	9
Q2	(China) Zhao JP	21	21
(Malaysia) H Hashim	21	11	18
8	(Indonesia) W Prasetyo	18	21	21

Second Round
(Indonesia) M Pangisthu	21	18	13
10	(Singapore) A Chen	12	21	21
Q2	(China) Zhao JP	18	16
8	(Indonesia) W Prasetyo	21	21

Third Round
10	(Singapore) A Chen	15	13
8	(Indonesia) W Prasetyo	21	21

==== Section 6 ====
First Round
(England) M Spencer-Smith	9	16
(Mexico) J Castillo	21	21
(Indonesia) F Hadmadi	22	21	11
16	(Malaysia) Loh WS	24	19	21
(Indonesia) I Mustofa	20	21	21
Q6	(Indonesia) Hermansyah	22	15	17
(Mexico) A Lopez	6	10
3	(Indonesia) D Rumbaka	21	21

Second Round
(Mexico) J Castillo	14	17
16	(Malaysia) Loh WS	21	21
(Indonesia) I Mustofa	18	6
3	(Indonesia) D Rumbaka	21	21

Third Round
16	(Malaysia) Loh WS	16	20
3	(Indonesia) D Rumbaka	21	22

==== Section 7 ====
First Round
(Indonesia) A Prasojo	14	16
(Singapore) Huang C	21	21
(Indonesia) A Ginting	19	21	13
14	(Hong Kong) Ng KL	21	19	21
(Brazil) F Toledo	16	16
(Indonesia) S Wibowo	21	21
(Indonesia) A Dharma	17	9
7	(Thailand) S Avihingsanon	21	21

Second Round
(Singapore) Huang C	21	23
14	(Hong Kong) Ng KL	18	21
(Indonesia) S Wibowo	14	16
7	(Thailand) S Avihingsanon	21	21

Third Round
(Singapore) Huang C	11	11
7	(Thailand) S Avihingsanon	21	21

==== Section 8 ====
First Round
(Singapore) Loh KY	21	21
(Indonesia) E Kusuma	19	8
(Indonesia) A Pratama	15	21	18
9	(Malaysia) I Zainuddin	21	18	21
Q7	(Indonesia) Y Rambitan	12	7
(Indonesia) E Sukamta	21	21
(Malaysia) B Wong	16	17
2	(Indonesia) S Kuncoro	21	21

Second Round
(Singapore) Loh KY	17	21	13
9	(Malaysia) I Zainuddin	21	16	21
(Indonesia) E Sukamta	7	16
2	(Indonesia) S Kuncoro	21	21

Third Round
9	(Malaysia) I Zainuddin	13	12
2	(Indonesia) S Kuncoro	21	21

== Women's singles ==
=== Seeds ===
1. (Indonesia) Lindaweni Fanetri (quarter-final)
2. (Indonesia) Aprilia Yuswandari (semi-final)
3. (Singapore) Gu Juan (second round)
4. (Indonesia) Bellaetrix Manuputty (quarter-final)
5. (Indonesia) Adriyanti Firdasari (first round)
6. (Indonesia) Hera Desi (first round)
7. (Malaysia) Tee Jing Yi (first round)
8. (Indonesia) Febby Angguni (quarter-final)

=== Finals ===
Semifinals
(China) Yao Xue	21	21
(Indonesia) Maria Febe Kusumastuti	11	16
(China) Suo Di	21	21
2	(Indonesia) Aprilia Yuswandari	18	19

Final
(China) Yao Xue	12	20
(China) Suo Di	21	22

=== Top half ===
==== Section 1 ====
First Round
1	(Indonesia) L Fanetri	21	21
Q4	(Indonesia) R Hartawan	16	9
(New Zealand) A Rankin	10	5
Q3	(Indonesia) F Ratoputri	21	21
7	(Malaysia) Tee JY	25	8
(Indonesia) A Rovita	27	21
(China) Yao X	21	21
(Indonesia) M Nadhir	13	11

Second Round
1	(Indonesia) L Fanetri	21	21
Q3	(Indonesia) F Ratoputri	12	15
(Indonesia) A Rovita	11	11
(China) Yao X	21	21

Quarterfinals
1	(Indonesia) L Fanetri	19	16
(China) Yao X	21	21

==== Section 2 ====
First Round
3	(Singapore) Gu J	21	16	21
(Indonesia) R Suwarno	17	21	10
(Malaysia) S Saniru	21	11
(Indonesia) M Kusumastuti	23	21
8	(Indonesia) F Angguni	26	21
Q2	(Indonesia) G Rahmadani	24	7
(Thailand) R Prajongjai	17	21	18
(Indonesia) R Riodingin	21	12	21

Second Round
3	(Singapore) Gu J	21	16	16
(Indonesia) M Kusumastuti	11	21	21
8	(Indonesia) F Angguni	21	21
(Indonesia) R Riodingin	14	12

Quarterfinals
(Indonesia) M Kusumastuti	21	23
8	(Indonesia) F Angguni	13	21

=== Bottom half ===
==== Section 3 ====
First Round
PFQ	(Indonesia) L Josephine	14	12
(Indonesia) E Purwaningtyas	21	21
(China) Suo D	21	22
6	(Indonesia) H Desi	16	20
(Philippines) M Alcala	17	21	13
(Indonesia) Y Asmarani	21	15	21
Q1	(Indonesia) Y Y Susanto	11	15
4	(Indonesia) B Manuputty	21	21

Second Round
(Indonesia) E Purwaningtyas	15	18
(China) Suo D	21	21
(Indonesia) Y Asmarani	19	10
4	(Indonesia) B Manuputty	21	21

Quarterfinals
(China) Suo D	21	21
4	(Indonesia) B Manuputty	19	14

==== Section 4 ====
First Round
(Indonesia) H Ramadini	21	21
(Mexico) C Gonzalez	10	9
(Singapore) Chen JY	21	21
5	(Indonesia) A Firdasari	15	16
(Indonesia) D Ayustine	19	21	21
(Malaysia) Yang LL	21	16	14
(Thailand) P Chochuwong	21	18	10
2	(Indonesia) A Yuswandari	18	21	21

Second Round
(Indonesia) H Ramadini	21	21
(Singapore) Chen JY	15	19
(Indonesia) D Ayustine	12	13
2	(Indonesia) A Yuswandari	21	21

Quarterfinals
(Indonesia) H Ramadini	12	15
2	(Indonesia) A Yuswandari	21	21

== Men's doubles ==
=== Seeds ===
1. (Indonesia) Mohammad Ahsan / Hendra Setiawan (quarter-final)
2. (Indonesia) Angga Pratama / Rian Agung Saputro (champion)
3. (Indonesia) Yonathan Suryatama / Hendra Aprida Gunawan (second round)
4. (Indonesia) Wahyu Nayaka / Ade Yusuf (quarter-final)
5. (Indonesia) Markis Kido / Markus Fernaldi Gideon (semi-final)
6. (Indonesia) Andrei Adistia / Didit Juang Indrianto (second round)
7. (Indonesia) Berry Angriawan / Ricky Karanda Suwardi (semi-final)
8. (Indonesia) Yohanes Rendy Sugiarto / Muhammad Ulinnuha (quarter-final)

=== Finals ===
Semifinals
(Indonesia) Ronald Alexander (Indonesia) Selvanus Geh	21	21
5	(Indonesia) Markis Kido (Indonesia) Markus Fernaldi Gideon	11	15
7	(Indonesia) Berry Angriawan (Indonesia) Ricky Karanda Suwardi	wo
2	(Indonesia) Angga Pratama (Indonesia) Rian Agung Saputro

Final
(Indonesia) Ronald Alexander (Indonesia) Selvanus Geh	21	15	16
2	(Indonesia) Angga Pratama (Indonesia) Rian Agung Saputro	17	21	21

=== Top half ===
==== Section 1 ====
First Round
1	(Indonesia) M Ahsan (Indonesia) H Setiawan	15	21	21
(Malaysia) R Abdul Latif (Malaysia) H Hashim	21	7	11
(Mexico) J Castillo (Mexico) A Ocegueda	9	8
Q2	(Indonesia) R Adianto (Indonesia) R Rianto	21	21
6	(Indonesia) A Adistia (Indonesia) D Indrianto	21	21
(Singapore) D Chrisnanta (Singapore) Loh KH	19	15
(Malaysia) Chooi KM (Malaysia) Teo EY	20	26	15
(Indonesia) R Alexander (Indonesia) S Geh	22	24	21

Second Round
1	(Indonesia) M Ahsan (Indonesia) H Setiawan	21	21
Q2	(Indonesia) R Adianto (Indonesia) R Rianto	12	12
6	(Indonesia) A Adistia (Indonesia) D Indrianto	15	21	14
(Indonesia) R Alexander (Indonesia) S Geh	21	14	21

Quarterfinals
1	(Indonesia) M Ahsan (Indonesia) H Setiawan	21	19	18
(Indonesia) R Alexander (Indonesia) S Geh	8	21	21

==== Section 2 ====
First Round
3	(Indonesia) Y Suryatama (Indonesia) H Gunawan	21	20	21
Q4	(Indonesia) H Setiawan (Indonesia) J Darmawandi	18	22	11
Q1	(Indonesia) Hantoro (Indonesia) R Sidarta	9	18
(China) Li JH (China) Liu YC	21	21
5	(Indonesia) M Kido (Indonesia) M Gideon	21	21
PFQ	(Brazil) L Pinto (Brazil) F Toledo	7	11
(Singapore) A Chen (Singapore) R Gonansa	19	21	9
(Indonesia) A Aldiartama (Indonesia) K Sukamuljo	21	16	21

Second Round
3	(Indonesia) Y Suryatama (Indonesia) H Gunawan	21	13
(China) Li JH (China) Liu YC	23	21
5	(Indonesia) M Kido (Indonesia) M Gideon	21	21
(Indonesia) A Aldiartama (Indonesia) K Sukamuljo	12	14

Quarterfinals
(China) Li JH (China) Liu YC	16	18
5	(Indonesia) M Kido (Indonesia) M Gideon	21	21

=== Bottom half ===
==== Section 3 ====
First Round
(Mexico) A Lopez (Mexico) L Munoz	7	9
(Indonesia) H Faisal (Indonesia) P Rhoma	21	21
(Canada) K Li (Canada) N Yakura	7	14
7	(Indonesia) B Angriawan (Indonesia) R Suwardi	21	21
(Singapore) T Hee (Singapore) T Yeo	16	21	21
(Indonesia) R Wijaya (Indonesia) R Sukmawan	21	18	19
Q3	(Indonesia) A Cahyono (Indonesia) K Ersa	19	21	18
4	(Indonesia) W Nayaka (Indonesia) A Yusuf	21	18	21

Second Round
(Indonesia) H Faisal (Indonesia) P Rhoma	11	18
7	(Indonesia) B Angriawan (Indonesia) R Suwardi	21	21
(Singapore) T Hee (Singapore) T Yeo	13	17
4	(Indonesia) W Nayaka (Indonesia) A Yusuf	21	21

Quarterfinals
7	(Indonesia) B Angriawan (Indonesia) R Suwardi	11	21	21
4	(Indonesia) W Nayaka (Indonesia) A Yusuf	21	17	16

==== Section 4 ====
First Round
(Indonesia) Hardianto (Indonesia) A Putra	17	18
(Thailand) W Ampunsuwan (Thailand) P Chalardchaleam	21	21
(China) Huang KX (China) Zheng SW	9	18
8	(Indonesia) Y Sugiarto (Indonesia) M Ulinnuha	21	21
(Malaysia) Ow YH (Malaysia) Teo KS	12	23
(Indonesia) F Kurniawan (Indonesia) B Septano	21	25
(Malaysia) J Singh (Malaysia) R Tan	13	14
2	(Indonesia) A Pratama (Indonesia) R Saputro	21	21

Second Round
(Thailand) W Ampunsuwan (Thailand) P Chalardchaleam	15	21	17
8	(Indonesia) Y Sugiarto (Indonesia) M Ulinnuha	21	13	21
(Indonesia) F Kurniawan (Indonesia) B Septano	21	13	17
2	(Indonesia) A Pratama (Indonesia) R Saputro	19	21	21

Quarterfinals
8	(Indonesia) Y Sugiarto (Indonesia) M Ulinnuha	12	18
2	(Indonesia) A Pratama (Indonesia) R Saputro	21	21

== Women's doubles ==
=== Seeds ===
1. (Indonesia) Pia Zebadiah Bernadeth / Rizki Amelia Pradipta (first round)
2. (Malaysia) Vivian Hoo Kah Mun / Woon Khe Wei (withdrew)
3. (Indonesia) Gebby Ristiyani Imawan / Tiara Rosalia Nuraidah (second round)
4. (Indonesia) Vita Marissa / Variella Aprilsasi (semi-final)
5. (Indonesia) Greysia Polii / Nitya Krishinda Maheswari (quarter-final)
6. (Singapore) Shinta Mulia Sari / Yao Lei (semi-final)
7. (Malaysia) Ng Hui Ern / Ng Hui Lin (first round)
8. (Indonesia) Anggia Shitta Awanda / Della Destiara Haris (quarter-final)

=== Finals ===
Semifinals
(China) Luo Ying (China) Luo Yu	21	21
4	(Indonesia) Vita Marissa (Indonesia) Variella Aprilsasi	17	15
6	(Singapore) Shinta Mulia Sari (Singapore) Yao Lei	15	21	13
(China) Huang Dongping (China) Jia Yifan	21	16	21

Final
(China) Luo Ying (China) Luo Yu	19	21	21
(China) Huang Dongping (China) Jia Yifan	21	15	18

=== Top half ===
==== Section 1 ====
First Round
1	(Indonesia) P Z Bernadeth (Indonesia) R Pradipta	11^{r}
(Malaysia) Lee MY (Malaysia) Lim YL	20
(Indonesia) D Fitriani (Indonesia) N Melati	15	21	14
(China) Luo Y (China) Luo Y	21	19	21
7	(Malaysia) Ng HE (Malaysia) Ng HL	21	15	18
(Indonesia) S Andini (Indonesia) J Gozali	19	21	21
(Singapore) Fu MT (Singapore) V Neo	10	7
(Indonesia) M Oktavianti (Indonesia) R Putri Sari	21	21

Second Round
(Malaysia) Lee MY (Malaysia) Lim YL	21	19
(China) Luo Y (China) Luo Y	23	21
(Indonesia) S Andini (Indonesia) J Gozali	17	26	17
(Indonesia) M Oktavianti (Indonesia) R Putri Sari	21	24	21

Quarterfinals
(China) Luo Y (China) Luo Y	21	21
(Indonesia) M Oktavianti (Indonesia) R Putri Sari	16	15

==== Section 2 ====
First Round
4	(Indonesia) V Marissa (Indonesia) V Aprilsasi	21	21
PFQ	(Indonesia) C Wear (Indonesia) D Gendy	17	16
Q2	(Indonesia) S D Augutia (Indonesia) S Mapasa	21	13	21
(Indonesia) K Dewi (Indonesia) M Jauhari	18	21	13
5	(Indonesia) G Polii (Indonesia) N Maheswari	21	21
Q4	(Indonesia) F Kusumawati (Indonesia) R Nugraheny	3	10
(Thailand) R Chuthabunditkul (Thailand) R Prajongjai	21	21
(Indonesia) N Anggraeni (Indonesia) J Chandra	11	9

Second Round
4	(Indonesia) V Marissa (Indonesia) V Aprilsasi	21	21
Q2	(Indonesia) S D Augutia (Indonesia) S Mapasa	16	7
5	(Indonesia) G Polii (Indonesia) N Maheswari	21	21
(Thailand) R Chuthabunditkul (Thailand) R Prajongjai	15	15

Quarterfinals
4	(Indonesia) V Marissa (Indonesia) V Aprilsasi	21	21
5	(Indonesia) G Polii (Indonesia) N Maheswari	19	16

=== Bottom half ===
==== Section 3 ====
First Round
(New Zealand) A Rankin (New Zealand) M Stapleton	5	9
(Indonesia) A Agustin (Indonesia) R Amelia	21	21
(Indonesia) M Giovani (Indonesia) M Oklamona	19	19
6	(Singapore) S Sari (Singapore) Yao L	21	21
(China) Chen QC (China) He JX	21	21
(Indonesia) A Ratnasari (Indonesia) M Rosita	9	6
Q3	(Indonesia) U Khasanah (Indonesia) M Mahmudin	7	15
3	(Indonesia) G Imawan (Indonesia) T Nuraidah	21	21

Second Round
(Indonesia) A Agustin (Indonesia) R Amelia	19	14
6	(Singapore) S Sari (Singapore) Yao L	21	21
(China) Chen QC (China) He JX	23	21
3	(Indonesia) G Imawan (Indonesia) T Nuraidah	21	14

Quarterfinals
6	(Singapore) S Sari (Singapore) Yao L	21	21
(China) Chen QC (China) He JX	14	13

==== Section 4 ====
First Round
(Thailand) P Arkornsakul (Thailand) J Kittiharakul	21	21
(Indonesia) S Antasari (Indonesia) L Pertiwi	15	13
Q1	(Indonesia) J Sugiarto (Indonesia) A Rahayu	14	10
8	(Indonesia) A Awanda (Indonesia) D Haris	21	21
(China) Huang DP (China) Jia YF	21	21
PFQ	(Indonesia) A Lana (Indonesia) M Mainaky	6	15
(Indonesia) D Permatasari (Indonesia) K Hanadia	21	24
PFQ	(Indonesia) I Khairunnisa (Indonesia) S Wulansari	19	22

Second Round
(Thailand) P Arkornsakul (Thailand) J Kittiharakul	11	10
8	(Indonesia) A Awanda (Indonesia) D Haris	21	21
(China) Huang DP (China) Jia YF	20	21	21
(Indonesia) D Permatasari (Indonesia) K Hanadia	22	15	12

Quarterfinals
8	(Indonesia) A Awanda (Indonesia) D Haris	19	19
(China) Huang DP (China) Jia YF	21	21

== Mixed doubles ==
=== Seeds ===
1. (Indonesia) Tontowi Ahmad / Lilyana Natsir (final)
2. (Indonesia) Muhammad Rijal / Debby Susanto (second round)
3. (Indonesia) Markis Kido / P Z Bernadeth (second round)
4. (Indonesia) Riky Widianto / Richi Puspita Dili (second round)
5. (Singapore) Danny Bawa Chrisnanta / Vanessa Neo Yu Yan (first round)
6. (Indonesia) Praveen Jordan / Vita Marissa (champion)
7. (Malaysia) Tan Aik Quan / Lai Pei Jing (first round)
8. (Indonesia) Irfan Fadhilah / Weni Anggraini (second round)

=== Finals ===
Semifinals
1	(Indonesia) Tontowi Ahmad (Indonesia) Lilyana Natsir	21	21
(China) Huang Kaixiang (China) Chen Qingchen	15	17
6	(Indonesia) Praveen Jordan (Indonesia) Vita Marissa	21	21
(Indonesia) Edi Subaktiar (Indonesia) Gloria Emanuelle Widjaja	10	18

Final
1	(Indonesia) Tontowi Ahmad (Indonesia) Lilyana Natsir	20	21	14
6	(Indonesia) Praveen Jordan (Indonesia) Vita Marissa	22	9	21

=== Top half ===
==== Section 1 ====
First Round
1	(Indonesia) T Ahmad (Indonesia) L Natsir	21	21
(Mexico) L Munoz (Mexico) C Gonzalez	7	10
(Indonesia) Ardiansyah (Indonesia) D Permatasari	16	23
(China) Li JH (China) Jia YF	21	25
7	(Malaysia) Tan AQ (Malaysia) Lai PJ	15	21	17
(Indonesia) M Gideon (Indonesia) R Pradipta	21	15	21
(Indonesia) A Prasetya (Indonesia) S Irawati	21	21
Q1	(Indonesia) A Rivai (Indonesia) A Budiharti	7	15

Second Round
1	(Indonesia) T Ahmad (Indonesia) L Natsir	21	21
(China) Li JH (China) Jia YF	11	9
(Indonesia) M Gideon (Indonesia) R Pradipta	12	21	21
(Indonesia) A Prasetya (Indonesia) S Irawati	21	16	19

Quarterfinals
1	(Indonesia) T Ahmad (Indonesia) L Natsir	21	21
(Indonesia) M Gideon (Indonesia) R Pradipta	7	13

==== Section 2 ====
First Round
4	(Indonesia) R Widianto (Indonesia) R Dili	21	16	21
(Singapore) T Hee (Singapore) Yao L	15	21	19
(China) Huang KX (China) Chen QC	21	21
(Indonesia) R Ismail (Indonesia) A Ratnasari	13	8
8	(Indonesia) I Fadhilah (Indonesia) W Anggraini	21	6	21
(Thailand) P Chalardchaleam (Thailand) R Chuthabunditkul	17	21	14
(Thailand) W Uttamang (Thailand) J Kittiharakul	18	21	21
(Malaysia) V Mawan (Malaysia) S Saniru	21	14	12

Second Round
4	(Indonesia) R Widianto (Indonesia) R Dili	12	13
(China) Huang KX (China) Chen QC	21	21
8	(Indonesia) I Fadhilah (Indonesia) W Anggraini	18	21	18
(Thailand) W Uttamang (Thailand) J Kittiharakul	21	14	21

Quarterfinals
(China) Huang KX (China) Chen QC	21	21
(Thailand) W Uttamang (Thailand) J Kittiharakul	15	15

=== Bottom half ===
==== Section 3 ====
First Round
(Singapore) T Yeo (Singapore) S Sari	21	21
(Indonesia) R Ristian (Indonesia) N Anggraeni	14	12
Q3	(Indonesia) R Nugroho (Indonesia) S Aulia	16	6
6	(Indonesia) P Jordan (Indonesia) V Marissa	21	21
(Indonesia) L Nugroho (Indonesia) A Saufika	21	21
Q4	(Indonesia) F Alfian (Indonesia) S D Augustia	19	11
Q2	(Indonesia) K Sukamuljo (Indonesia) M Mahmudin	17	13
3	(Indonesia) M Kido (Indonesia) P Z Bernadeth	21	21

Second Round
(Singapore) T Yeo (Singapore) S Sari	16	19
6	(Indonesia) P Jordan (Indonesia) V Marissa	21	21
(Indonesia) L Nugroho (Indonesia) A Saufika
3	(Indonesia) M Kido (Indonesia) P Z Bernadeth	wo

Quarterfinals
6	(Indonesia) P Jordan (Indonesia) V Marissa	21	21
(Indonesia) L Nugroho (Indonesia) A Saufika	18	16

==== Section 4 ====
First Round
(Malaysia) Ong JG (Malaysia) Lim YL	21	21
(Indonesia) R Akbar (Indonesia) K Hanadia	13	17
(Indonesia) Y Satrio (Indonesia) N Istirani	10	21	22
5	(Singapore) D Chrisnanta (Singapore) V Neo	21	19	20
(Indonesia) E Subaktiar (Indonesia) G Widjaja	21	21
(Thailand) W Ampunsuwan (Thailand) R Prajongjai	19	18
(China) Liu YC (China) Huang DP	21	18	17
2	(Indonesia) M Rijal (Indonesia) D Susanto	19	21	21

Second Round
(Malaysia) Ong JG (Malaysia) Lim YL	21	21
(Indonesia) Y Satrio (Indonesia) N Istirani	10	12
(Indonesia) E Subaktiar (Indonesia) G Widjaja	21	13	21
2	(Indonesia) M Rijal (Indonesia) D Susanto	14	21	15

Quarterfinals
(Malaysia) Ong JG (Malaysia) Lim YL	21	19	19
(Indonesia) E Subaktiar (Indonesia) G Widjaja	18	21	21

Preceded by 2013 Chinese Taipei Open Grand Prix Gold	BWF Grand Prix Gold and Grand Prix; 2013 season	Succeeded by 2013 Russia Open Grand Prix
