= 2011 India Open Grand Prix Gold =

Tournament details
- Dates: 20–25 December
- Level: Grand Prix Gold
- Total prize money: US$120,000
- Venue: Babu Banarasi Das Indoor Stadium
- Location: Lucknow, India

Champions
- Men's singles: (Indonesia) Taufik Hidayat
- Women's singles: (Thailand) Ratchanok Intanon
- Men's doubles: (Japan) Naoki Kawamae (Japan) Shoji Sato
- Women's doubles: (Singapore) Shinta Mulia Sari (Singapore) Yao Lei
- Mixed doubles: (Thailand) Sudket Prapakamol (Thailand) Saralee Thungthongkam

The 2011 India Open Grand Prix also known as Yonex–Sunrise Syed Modi Memorial India Open Grand Prix Gold was a badminton tournament which took place at Babu Banarasi Das Indoor Stadium in Lucknow, India from 20 to 25 December 2011 and had a total purse of $120,000. This is for the first time this tournament was graded as a Grand Prix Gold event, where before rate as Grand Prix event. This tournament was part of the qualification stage of 2012 Summer Olympics.

== Men's singles ==
=== Seeds ===
1. (Indonesia) Simon Santoso (third round)
2. (Indonesia) Taufik Hidayat (champion)
3. (Denmark) Hans-Kristian Vittinghus (second round)
4. (Indonesia) Tommy Sugiarto (third round)
5. (Hong Kong) Wong Wing Ki (semi-finals)
6. (Indonesia) Dionysius Hayom Rumbaka (third round)
7. (Hong Kong) Hu Yun (quarter-finals)
8. (Indonesia) Alamsyah Yunus (quarter-finals)
9. (India) Ajay Jayaram (first round)
10. (India) Parupalli Kashyap (second round)
11. (Chinese Taipei) Hsu Jen-hao (third round)
12. (Thailand) Tanongsak Saensomboonsuk (second round)
13. (Singapore) Derek Wong (second round)
14. (India) R. M. V. Gurusaidutt (third round)
15. (Malaysia) Daren Liew (withdrew)
16. (Thailand) Suppanyu Avihingsanon (semi-finals)

=== Finals ===
Quarter-finals
(Malaysia) Misbun Ramdan Mohmed Misbun	15	13
16	(Thailand) Suppanyu Avihingsanon	21	21
(India) Sourabh Varma	23	21
7	(Hong Kong) Hu Yun	21	19
5	(Hong Kong) Wong Wing Ki	21	21
Q	(India) Sameer Verma	12	13
8	(Indonesia) Alamsyah Yunus	17	21	11
2	(Indonesia) Taufik Hidayat	21	11	21

Semi-finals
16	(Thailand) Suppanyu Avihingsanon	24	13
(India) Sourabh Varma	26	21
5	(Hong Kong) Wong Wing Ki	16	21	18
2	(Indonesia) Taufik Hidayat	21	15	21

Final
(India) Sourabh Varma	15	18
2	(Indonesia) Taufik Hidayat	21	21

== Women's singles ==
=== Seeds ===
1. (India) Saina Nehwal (withdrew)
2. (Thailand) Porntip Buranaprasertsuk (final)
3. (Thailand) Ratchanok Intanon (champion)
4. (Japan) Eriko Hirose (semi-finals)
5. (Singapore) Gu Juan (quarter-finals)
6. (France) Pi Hongyan (withdrew)
7. (Singapore) Fu Mingtian (withdrew)
8. (Thailand) Salakjit Ponsana (withdrew)

=== Finals ===
Semi-finals
(Hong Kong) Chan Tsz Ka	16	15
3	(Thailand) Ratchanok Intanon	21	21
4	(Japan) Eriko Hirose	20	15
2	(Thailand) Porntip Buranaprasertsuk	22	21

Final
3	(Thailand) Ratchanok Intanon	w	/	o
2	(Thailand) Porntip Buranaprasertsuk

== Men's doubles ==
=== Seeds ===
1. (Japan) Naoki Kawamae / Shoji Sato (champions)
2. (Germany) Ingo Kindervater / Johannes Schöttler (semi-finals)
3. (Netherlands) Ruud Bosch / Koen Ridder (second round)
4. (India) K. T. Rupesh Kumar / Sanave Thomas (second round)
5. (Indonesia) Hendra Aprida Gunawan / Candra Wijaya (first round)
6. (Thailand) Bodin Issara / Maneepong Jongjit (quarter-finals)
7. (Thailand) Songphon Anugritayawon / Sudket Prapakamol (second round)
8. (Malaysia) Ow Yao Han / Tan Wee Kiong (semi-finals)

=== Finals ===
Semi-finals
1	(Japan) Naoki Kawamae (Japan) Shoji Sato	21	21
8	(Malaysia) Ow Yao Han (Malaysia) Tan Wee Kiong	14	16
(Indonesia) Andrei Adistia (Indonesia) Christopher Rusdianto	21	21
2	(Germany) Ingo Kindervater (Germany) Johannes Schöttler	15	14

Final
1	(Japan) Naoki Kawamae (Japan) Shoji Sato	21	12	23
(Indonesia) Andrei Adistia (Indonesia) Christopher Rusdianto	17	21	21

== Women's doubles ==
=== Seeds ===
1. (Japan) Miyuki Maeda / Satoko Suetsuna (final)
2. (Indonesia) Vita Marissa / Nadya Melati (quarter-finals)
3. (India) Jwala Gutta / Ashwini Ponnappa (second round)
4. (Thailand) Duanganong Aroonkesorn / Kunchala Voravichitchaikul (second round)

=== Finals ===
Semi-finals
1	(Japan) Miyuki Maeda (Japan) Satoko Suetsuna	18	21	21
(Malaysia) Vivian Hoo Kah Mun (Malaysia) Woon Khe Wei	21	16	19
(Singapore) Shinta Mulia Sari (Singapore) Yao Lei	21	21
(Malaysia) Chin Eei Hui (Malaysia) Wong Pei Tty	18	15

Final
1	(Japan) Miyuki Maeda (Japan) Satoko Suetsuna	17	18
(Singapore) Shinta Mulia Sari (Singapore) Yao Lei	21	21

== Mixed doubles ==
=== Seeds ===
1. (Thailand) Sudket Prapakamol / Saralee Thoungthongkam (champions)
2. (Thailand) Songphon Anugritayawon / Kunchala Voravichitchaikul (second round)
3. (Malaysia) Chan Peng Soon / Goh Liu Ying (quarter-finals)
4. (India) Valiyaveetil Diju / Jwala Gutta (semi-finals)

=== Finals ===
Semi-finals
1	(Thailand) Sudket Prapakamol (Thailand) Saralee Thoungthongkam	21	13	21
(Indonesia) Fran Kurniawan (Indonesia) Shendy Puspa Irawati	8	21	16
4	(India) Valiyaveetil Diju (India) Jwala Gutta	15	12
(Indonesia) Muhammad Rijal (Indonesia) Debby Susanto	21	21

Final
1	(Thailand) Sudket Prapakamol (Thailand) Saralee Thoungthongkam	16	21	21
(Indonesia) Muhammad Rijal (Indonesia) Debby Susanto	21	18	11
