= 2010 BWF World Junior Championships – girls' singles =

2010 BWF World Junior Championships girls' singles
Tournament details
- Dates: 21 April 2010 – 25 April 2010
- Edition: 12th
- Level: International
- Venue: CODE Dome
- Location: Guadalajara, Mexico

The girls' singles event for the 2010 BWF World Junior Championships was held between 21 April and 25 April. Ratchanok Intanon defended her title, becoming the first ever to do so in her category.

== Seeded ==
1. (Thailand) Ratchanok Intanon (champion)
2. (China) Suo Di (semi-final)
3. (China) Deng Xuan (fourth round)
4. (Thailand) Sapsiree Taerattanachai (fourth round)
5. (South Korea) Choi Hye-In (third round)
6. (Malaysia) Sonia Cheah Su Ya (quarter-final)
7. (Germany) Fabienne Deprez (quarter-final)
8. (Chinese Taipei) Tai Tzu-Ying (fourth round)
9. (Chinese Taipei) Chiang Mei-Hui (second round)
10. (Japan) Misaki Matsutomo (final)
11. (Thailand) Nittayaporn Nipatsant (third round)
12. (China) Jiang Yujing (fourth round)
13. (China) Wang Liang (fourth round)
14. (England) Sarah Milne (third round)
15. (Spain) Carolina Marín (quarter-final)
16. (France) Lea Palermo (second round)

== Draw ==
=== Finals ===
Quarterfinals
1	(Thailand) Ratchanok Intanon	21	21
5/8	(Germany) Fabienne Deprez	19	7
9/16	(Spain) Carolina Marín	21	14	13
(Japan) Naoko Fukuman	17	21	21
5/8	(Malaysia) Sonia Cheah Su Ya	8	18
9/16	(Japan) Misaki Matsutomo	21	21
(India) Pusarla Venkata Sindhu	21	17	15
2	(China) Suo Di	13	21	21

Semifinals
1	(Thailand) Ratchanok Intanon	21	21
(Japan) Naoko Fukuman	9	16
9/16	(Japan) Misaki Matsutomo	17	22	21
2	(China) Suo Di	21	20	19

Final
1	(Thailand) Ratchanok Intanon	21	16	21
9/16	(Japan) Misaki Matsutomo	13	21	10

=== Top half ===
==== Section 1 ====
First round
(Hong Kong) Yuen SY	14	17
(South Korea) Yang R-S	21	21
(England) H Rogers	21	21
(South Africa) E De Villiers	12	13

Second round
1	(Thailand) R Intanon	21	21
(Mexico) A Guerrero	4	1
(Hong Kong) Tsang WC	13	16
(South Korea) Yang R-S	21	21
9/16	(China) Wang L	21	21
(Austria) S Kohlfurst	5	7
(Guatemala) N Sotomayor	17	10
(England) H Rogers	21	21

Third round
1	(Thailand) R Intanon	21	21
(South Korea) Yang R-S	19	17
9/16	(China) Wang L	21	21
(England) H Rogers	12	13

Fourth round
1	(Thailand) R Intanon	21	21
9/16	(China) Wang L	11	10

==== Section 2 ====
First round
(Brazil) A Campos	3	6
(Turkey) O Bayrak	21	21
(India) S Rane	21	16	21
(Turkey) N Yigit	17	21	9

Second round
5/8	(Germany) F Deprez	21	21
(Singapore) Cheong HM	10	12
(Peru) K Marcenaro	5	3
(Turkey) O Bayrak	21	21
9/16	(Thailand) N Nipatsant	19	21	21
(South Korea) Park K-W	21	19	16
(Indonesia) N Agustianti	21	21
(India) S Rane	17	12

Third round
5/8	(Germany) F Deprez	21	21
(Turkey) O Bayrak	11	8
9/16	(Thailand) N Nipatsant	18	22	19
(Indonesia) N Agustianti	21	20	21

Fourth round
5/8	(Germany) F Deprez	21	17	21
(Indonesia) N Agustianti	11	21	15

==== Section 3 ====
First round
(Peru) K Winder	21	21
(France) L Meheust	14	19
(India) S Rane	15	26
(Singapore) E Chua	21	28

Second round
3/4	(China) Deng X	21	21
(Russia) M Korobeyinkova	5	9
(Canada) J Chan	8	12
(Peru) K Winder	21	21
9/16	(Spain) C Marín	21	21
(Mexico) A Chinas	12	13
(South Korea) Kang G-H	21	21
(Singapore) E Chua	9	13

Third round
3/4	(China) Deng X	22	21
(Peru) K Winder	20	9
9/16	(Spain) C Marín	21	21
(South Korea) Kang G-H	13	9

Fourth round
3/4	(China) Deng X	21	10	21
9/16	(Spain) C Marín	14	21	23

==== Section 4 ====
First round
(Puerto Rico) D Santana	12	13
(Malaysia) Yang LL	21	21
(Japan) N Fukuman	21	21
(Canada) J Leung	6	10
(Denmark) M Poulsen	21	21
(Turkey) N Kilic	17	18

Second round
5/8	(Chinese Taipei) Tai T-Y	21	21
(Netherlands) T Peters	8	10
(Singapore) Tan WH	11	17
(Malaysia) Yang LL	21	21
9/16	(England) S Milne	21	21
(Russia) A Chervaykova	19	13
(Japan) N Fukuman	22	19	21
(Denmark) M Poulsen	20	21	11

Third round
5/8	(Chinese Taipei) Tai T-Y	19	21	21
(Malaysia) Yang LL	21	14	11
9/16	(England) S Milne	16	23	11
(Japan) N Fukuman	21	21	21

Fourth round
5/8	(Chinese Taipei) Tai T-Y	14	21	12
(Japan) N Fukuman	21	12	21

=== Bottom half ===
==== Section 5 ====
First round
(England) H Lewczynska	21	14	19
(Indonesia) M Wiranto	14	21	21
(Denmark) C Juel	17	9
(Canada) T Wong	21	21
(Russia) E Kosetskaya	19	15
(Denmark) S Jensen	21	21

Second round
(Indonesia) M Wiranto	21	21
(Canada) T Wong	9	19
(Austria) N Almer	7	7
9/16	(China) Jiang YJ	21	21
(Denmark) S Jensen	22	21
(Netherlands) S Eijbergen	20	13
(Germany) K Kattenbeck	8	4
5/8	(Malaysia) S Cheah	21	21

Third round
(Indonesia) M Wiranto	21	11	17
9/16	(China) Jiang YJ	19	21	21
(Denmark) S Jensen	12	15
5/8	(Malaysia) S Cheah	21	21

Fourth round
9/16	(China) Jiang YJ	18	13
5/8	(Malaysia) S Cheah	21	21

==== Section 6 ====
First round
(Singapore) N Goh	16	14
(Hong Kong) Yeung YK	21	21
(Austria) E Widowitz	21	21
(Peru) L Zornoza	19	11

Second round
(Hong Kong) Yeung YK	9	15
(Japan) A Mine	21	21
(Brazil) R Carvalho	8	5
9/16	(Japan) M Matsutomo	21	21
(Austria) E Widowitz	18	21	21
(Puerto Rico) I Gonzalez	21	11	18
(Germany) I Herttrich	16	11
5/8	(Thailand) S Taerattanachai	21	21

Third round
(Japan) A Mine	16	19
9/16	(Japan) M Matsutomo	21	21
(Austria) E Widowitz	4	3
5/8	(Thailand) S Taerattanachai	21	21

Fourth round
9/16	(Japan) M Matsutomo	9	21	21
5/8	(Thailand) S Taerattanachai	21	9	19

==== Section 7 ====
First round
(Peru) L Duany	8	11
(Netherlands) J Wentholt	21	21
(Denmark) L Kjaersfeldt	14	12
(India) P Sindhu	21	21

Second round
(Netherlands) J Wentholt	21	21
(South Africa) J van den Berg	9	6
(Austria) A Mathis	21	8	21
9/16	(France) L Palermo	19	21	10
(India) P Sindhu	21	21
(England) P Riou	14	11
(Thailand) P Panjarat	13	7
5/8	(South Korea) Choi H-I	21	21

Third round
(Netherlands) J Wentholt	21	16	21
(Austria) A Mathis	17	21	8
(India) P Sindhu	21	21
5/8	(South Korea) Choi H-I	10	10

Fourth round
(Netherlands) J Wentholt	14	18
(India) P Sindhu	21	21

==== Section 8 ====
First round
(Spain) B Corrales	21	21
(Puerto Rico) G Medina	6	5
(South Africa) L de Wet	4	5
(Turkey) E Tunali	21	21

Second round
(Spain) B Corrales	21	21
(Mexico) M Ugalde	9	9
(Japan) S Takahashi	21	21
9/16	(Chinese Taipei) Chiang M-H	17	12
(Turkey) E Tunali	21	21
(Canada) S Kadam	8	7
(South Africa) S Le Grange	5	2
2	(China) Suo D	21	21

Third round
(Spain) B Corrales	16	16
(Japan) S Takahashi	21	21
(Turkey) E Tunali	9	17
2	(China) Suo D	21	21

Fourth round
(Japan) S Takahashi	18	14
2	(China) Suo D	21	21
