= 2008 BWF World Junior Championships – girls' singles =

2008 BWF World Junior Championships girls' Singles
Tournament details
- Dates: 29 October 2008 – 2 November 2008
- Edition: 10th
- Level: International
- Venue: Shree Shiv Chhatrapati Sports Complex
- Location: Pune, India

The girls' singles event for the 2008 BWF World Junior Championships was held between 29 October and 2 November. Saina Nehwal became the first Indian to win the title.

== Seeds ==
1. IND Saina Nehwal (champion)
2. CHN Li Xuerui (fourth round)
3. CHN Wang Shixian (semi-final)
4. KOR Bae Youn-joo (quarter-final)
5. KOR Sung Ji-hyun (fourth round)
6. DEN Anne Hald Jensen (fourth round)
7. CHN Chen Xiaojia (fourth round)
8. THA Porntip Buranaprasertsuk (semi-final)
9. THA Sapsiree Taerattanachai (second round)
10. JPN Eriko Tamaki (fourth round)
11. JPN Sayaka Sato (final)
12. TPE Hung Shih-han (fourth round)
13. INA Febby Angguni (second round)
14. NZL Jessica Jonggowisastro (third round)
15. CAN Michelle Li (third round)
16. HKG Chan Tsz Ka (third round)

== Draw ==
=== Finals ===
Quarterfinals
1	IND Saina Nehwal	21	21
INA Lindaweni Fanetri	13	13
3/4	CHN Wang Shixian	21	21
THA Ratchanok Intanon	16	10
5/8	THA P Buranaprasertsuk	17	21	21
3/4	KOR Bae Youn-joo	21	16	14
JPN Ayaka Takahashi	18	14
9/16	JPN Sayaka Sato	21	21

Semifinals
1	IND Saina Nehwal	22	21
3/4	CHN Wang Shixian	20	12
5/8	THA P Buranaprasertsuk	17	16
9/16	JPN Sayaka Sato	21	21

Final
1	IND Saina Nehwal	21	21
9/16	JPN Sayaka Sato	9	18

=== Top half ===
==== Section 1 ====
First round
HKG Tse YS	21	21
CZE Š Křížková	8	10
THA N Jindapol	19	21	21
TPE Chiang M-h	21	16	23
BEL L Tan	9	16
IND P Thulasi	21	21

Second round
1	IND S Nehwal	21	21
TUR Ö Bayrak	11	8
EGY N Ashraf	4	10
HKG Tse YS	21	21
9/16	TPE Hung S-h	21	21
SIN Mok JQ	8	14
TPE Chiang M-h	18	22	23
IND P Thulasi	21	20	21

Third round
1	IND S Nehwal	21	21
HKG Tse YS	9	12
9/16	TPE Hung S-h	21	22
TPE Chiang M-h	12	20

Fourth round
1	IND S Nehwal	21	21
9/16	TPE Hung S-h	13	11

==== Section 2 ====
First round
NZL M O'Connor	8	11
ENG P Riou	21	21
SIN Thng TT	21	21
TUR R Kurtuluş	17	11
INA L Fanetri	21	21
GER F Burkert	11	14

Second round
5/8	KOR Sung J-h	21	21
EGY D Khairy	2	2
EST K Margus	4	3
ENG P Riou	21	21
9/16	THA S Taerattanachai	22	21	19
MAS Tee JY	24	12	21
SIN Thng TT	9	21	12
INA L Fanetri	21	17	21

Third round
5/8	KOR Sung J-h	21	21
ENG P Riou	10	12
MAS Tee JY	8	21	19
INA L Fanetri	21	19	21

Fourth round
5/8	KOR Sung J-h	16	9
INA L Fanetri	21	21

==== Section 3 ====
First round
KEN S Njage	WO
MAS Ng SE
FRA M Luttmann	14	13
RUS N Perminova	21	21
SRI S Dahanayake	16	21
ENG L Smith	21	23

Second round
3/4	CHN Wang SX	21	21
GER M Stahlberg	11	8
HKG Chan HY	21	21
MAS Ng SE	19	8
9/16	JPN E Tamaki	21	21
SRI G Perera	4	5
RUS N Perminova	21	21
ENG L Smith	12	8

Third round
3/4	CHN Wang SX	26	21
HKG Chan HY	24	8
9/16	JPN E Tamaki	21	21
RUS N Perminova	15	9

Fourth round
3/4	CHN Wang SX	21	21
9/16	JPN E Tamaki	18	17

==== Section 4 ====
First round
SRI S Illangakoon	11	9
INA S Anida	21	21
FRA A Fontaine	6	8
THA R Intanon	21	21
EST L Vana	21	22
CAN C Giuffre	14	20

Second round
5/8	CHN Chen XJ	21	21
NED Wong YM	18	7
SCO K McGlynn	21	4	13
INA S Anida	8	21	21
9/16	CAN M Li	21	21
EGY M El Tanany	10	11
THA R Intanon	21	21
EST L Vana	11	14

Third round
5/8	CHN Chen XJ	21	21
INA S Anida	12	17
9/16	CAN M Li	14	21	13
THA R Intanon	21	18	21

Fourth round
5/8	CHN Chen XJ	22	14	18
THA R Intanon	20	21	21

=== Bottom half ===
==== Section 5 ====
First round
CZE P Hofmanová	21	21
MRI K Kune	13	9
INA R Pradipta	21	21
EST G Teder	5	10
KOR Yang R-s	21	21
SIN S Neo	12	11

Second round
CZE P Hofmanová	14	6
INA R Pradipta	21	21
MAS F Ng	16	12
9/16	HKG Chan TK	21	21
KOR Yang R-s	21	21
SRI A Rathnasiri	19	14
IND S Reddy	26	9
5/8	THA P Buranaprasertsuk	28	21

Third round
INA R Pradipta	21	21	21
9/16	HKG Chan TK	23	15	12
KOR Yang R-s	20	8
5/8	THA P Buranaprasertsuk	22	21

Fourth round
INA R Pradipta	13	21	4
5/8	THA P Buranaprasertsuk	21	16	21

==== Section 6 ====
First round
KEN M Muli	WO
HKG Poon LY
NZL M Chan	13	5
SIN Fu MT	21	21
NED I Tabeling	12	12
RUS A Chervaykova	21	21

Second round
HKG Poon LY	18	21
SIN Fu MT	21	23
KOR Choi H-i	14	21	21
9/16	INA F Angguni	21	18	15
RUS A Chervaykova	17	16
GER L Heidenreich	21	21
CAN K Lougheed	13	4
3/4	KOR Bae Y-j	21	21

Third round
SIN Fu MT	21	21
KOR Choi H-i	18	16
GER L Heidenreich	17	13
3/4	KOR Bae Y-j	21	21

Fourth round
SIN Fu MT	9	10
3/4	KOR Bae Y-j	21	21

==== Section 7 ====
First round
JPN A Takahashi	21	21
RUS E Komendrovskaya	12	13
TUR E Tunalı	14	16
FRA M Maunoury	21	21
RUS R Gabdullina	21	21
EST G Saar	14	14

Second round
JPN A Takahashi	21	21
FRA M Maunoury	10	8
BUL B Maneva	12	21
9/16	NZL J Jonggowisastro	21	23
RUS R Gabdullina	21	6	21
TPE Liu I-c	16	21	19
TPE Hsu Y-c	13	21	17
5/8	DEN A Jensen	21	18	21

Third round
JPN A Takahashi	15	21	21
9/16	NZL J Jonggowisastro	21	14	8
RUS R Gabdullina	11	14
5/8	DEN A Jensen	19	21	21

Fourth round
JPN A Takahashi	21	21
5/8	DEN A Jensen	13	17

==== Section 8 ====
First round
JPN M Matsutomo	21	21
USA T Chase-Currier	17	15
EGY N El Banna	21	11	11
CAN S Pakenham	19	21	21
IND P Sawant	21	21
ENG A Langley	16	15

Second round
JPN M Matsutomo	21	21
CAN S Pakenham	4	10
TUR Ö Çalışkan	15	7
9/16	JPN S Sato	21	21
IND P Sawant	8	6
CHN Lin S	21	21
ENG K Robertshaw	9	6
2	CHN Li XR	21	21

Third round
JPN M Matsutomo	21	18	21
9/16	JPN S Sato	17	21	23
CHN Lin S	10	12
2	CHN Li XR	21	21

Fourth round
9/16	JPN S Sato	15	21	21
2	CHN Li XR	21	16	9
