= 2010 Asian Junior Badminton Championships =

Tournament details
- Dates: 24-28 March 2010
- Edition: 13
- Venue: Stadium Juara
- Location: Kuala Lumpur, Malaysia

The 2010 Asian Junior Badminton Championships is an Asia continental junior championships to crown the best U-19 badminton players across Asia. It was the 13th tournament of the Asian Junior Badminton Championships, and held in Kuala Lumpur, Malaysia from 24–28 March.

== Venue ==
- Stadium Juara, Bukit Kiara Sports Complex, Kuala Lumpur.

== Medalists ==
Event	Gold	Silver	Bronze
Teams	China; Cai Ruiqing; Chen Zhoufu; Huang Yuxiang; Li Gen; Liu Cheng; Liu Kai; Song Ziwei; Wang Tianyang; Bao Yixin; Deng Xuan; Ou Dongni; Suo Di; Tang Jinhua; Wang Yini; Xia Huan; Xiao Ting	Malaysia; Nelson Heg; Lim Yu Sheng; Loh Wei Sheng; Ow Yao Han; Tan Wee Tat; Teo Ee Yi; Yew Hong Kheng; Zulfadli Zulkiffli; Soniia Cheah Su Ya; Chow Mei Kuan; Lai Pei Jing; Shevon Jamie Lai; Lee Meng Yean; Lim Yin Fun; Ng Sin Er; Yang Li Lian	Indonesia; Nur Wahid Ardianto; Hermansah; Jones Ralfy Jansen; Ricky Karanda Suwardi; Dandi Prabudita; Ericson Rusdianto; Riyanto Subagja; Evert Sukamta; Suci Rizky Andini; Della Destiara Haris; Gebby Ristiyani Imawan; Ganis Nurahmandani; Tiara Rosalia Nuraidah; Elyzabeth Purwaningtyas; Yulia Yosephine Susanto; Renna Suwarno
Teams	China; Cai Ruiqing; Chen Zhoufu; Huang Yuxiang; Li Gen; Liu Cheng; Liu Kai; Song Ziwei; Wang Tianyang; Bao Yixin; Deng Xuan; Ou Dongni; Suo Di; Tang Jinhua; Wang Yini; Xia Huan; Xiao Ting	Malaysia; Nelson Heg; Lim Yu Sheng; Loh Wei Sheng; Ow Yao Han; Tan Wee Tat; Teo Ee Yi; Yew Hong Kheng; Zulfadli Zulkiffli; Soniia Cheah Su Ya; Chow Mei Kuan; Lai Pei Jing; Shevon Jamie Lai; Lee Meng Yean; Lim Yin Fun; Ng Sin Er; Yang Li Lian	Thailand; Wannawat Ampunsuwan; Akrawin Apisuk; Inkarat Apisuk; Nathapon Chokdeepanich; Tinn Isriyanet; Pisit Poodchalat; Parinyawat Thongnuam; Boonyakorn Thumpanichwong; Ratchanok Intanon; Chonthicha Kititharakul; Narissapat Lam; Nittayaporn Nipatsant; Maetenee Phattanaphitoon; Rassanan Phetmaneelumkha; Sapsiree Taerattanachai; Wangpaiboonkit Pijitjan
Boys' singles	(China) Huang Yuxiang	(Malaysia) Loh Wei Sheng	(Malaysia) Zulfadli Zulkiffli
Boys' singles	(China) Huang Yuxiang	(Malaysia) Loh Wei Sheng	(Indonesia) Evert Sukamta
Girls' singles	(China) Suo Di	(Thailand) Sapsiree Taerattanachai	(China) Geng Jian
Girls' singles	(China) Suo Di	(Thailand) Sapsiree Taerattanachai	(China) Deng Xuan
Boys' doubles	(South Korea) Kang Ji-wook and Choi Seung-il	(Malaysia) Yew Hong Kheng and Ow Yao Han	(Malaysia) Teo Ee Yi and Nelson Heg Wei Keat
Boys' doubles	(South Korea) Kang Ji-wook and Choi Seung-il	(Malaysia) Yew Hong Kheng and Ow Yao Han	(Indonesia) Jones Ralfy Jansen and Dandi Prabudita
Girls' doubles	(China) Tang Jinhua and Xia Huan	(China) Ou Dongni and Bao Yixin	(Malaysia) Yang Li Lian and Sonia Cheah Su Ya
Girls' doubles	(China) Tang Jinhua and Xia Huan	(China) Ou Dongni and Bao Yixin	(Thailand) Ratchanok Inthanon and Wangpaiboonkit Pijitjan
Mixed doubles	(China) Liu Cheng and Bao Yixin	(Malaysia) Ow Yao Han and Lai Pei Jing	(Thailand) Pisit Poodchalat and Narissapat Lam
Mixed doubles	(China) Liu Cheng and Bao Yixin	(Malaysia) Ow Yao Han and Lai Pei Jing	(Indonesia) Ricky Karanda Suwardi and Della Destiara Haris

== Medal count ==
Pos	Country	Gold	Silver	Bronze	Total
1	China	5	1	2	8
2	South Korea	1	0	0	1
3	Malaysia	0	4	3	7
4	Thailand	0	1	3	4
5	Indonesia	0	0	4	4
