= Febby Angguni =

Indonesian badminton player

Personal information
- Born: 8 July 1991 (age 35) Bandung, West Java, Indonesia

Sport
- Country: Indonesia
- Sport: Badminton
- Handedness: Right

Women's singles
- Highest ranking: 31 (19 December 2013)
- BWF profile
Medal record
Women's badminton
Representing Indonesia
Asian Junior Championships
Bronze medal – third place	2007 Kuala Lumpur	Mixed team
Bronze medal – third place	2009 Kuala Lumpur	Girls' singles

Febby Angguni (born 8 July 1991) is an Indonesian badminton player who affiliate with Berkat Abadi Banjarmasin club. Started her career as a member of Djarum club, she was selected to join the national team when she was 14. At the age of 17, she won her first senior international title at the 2008 Malaysia International Challenge.

== Achievements ==
=== ASEAN University Games ===
Women's singles
Year	Venue	Opponent	Score	Result	Ref.
2014	Dempo Sports Hall; Palembang, Indonesia	(Indonesia) Aprilia Yuswandari	21–17, 15–21, 22–20	Gold	

=== Asian Junior Championships ===
Girls' singles
Year	Venue	Opponent	Score	Result
2009	Stadium Juara; Kuala Lumpur, Malaysia	(Chinese Taipei) Tai Tzu-ying	21–19, 8–21, 25–27	Bronze

=== BWF International Challenge/Series (7 titles, 3 runners-up) ===
Women's singles
Year	Tournament	Opponent	Score	Result
2008	Malaysia International	(South Korea) Bae Seung-hee	22–20, 21–17	(gold) Winner
2009	Auckland International	(Indonesia) Rosaria Yusfin Pungkasari	21–15, 21–16	(gold) Winner
2012	India International	(India) P. C. Thulasi	15–21, 13–21	(silver) Runner-up
2013	Iran Fajr International	(Turkey) Neslihan Yiğit	15–21, 14–21	(silver) Runner-up
2013	Kharkiv International	(Indonesia) Ana Rovita	22–20, 21–14	(gold) Winner
2013	Belgian International	(Chinese Taipei) Cheng Chi-ya	22–20, 21–11	(gold) Winner
2013	India International	(Indonesia) Ana Rovita	20–22, 21–14, 21–19	(gold) Winner
2014	USM Indonesia International	(Indonesia) Ana Rovita	21–14, 21–16	(gold) Winner
2015	Finnish Open	(Spain) Beatriz Corrales	19–21, 12–21	(silver) Runner-up
2015	Finnish International	(Denmark) Sofie Holmboe Dahl	18–21, 21–10, 21–8	(gold) Winner

BWF International Challenge tournament
BWF International Series tournament

== Performance timeline ==
Key

W	Won	F	Finalist	SF	Semi-finalist
QF	Quarter-finalist	#R	Rounds 4, 3, 2, 1	RR	Round-robin stage
Q#	Qualification round	A	Absent	w/d	Withdrew
G	Gold	S	Silver	B	Bronze
NH	Not held	N/A	Not applicable	DNQ	Did not qualify

=== National team ===
- Junior level

Team event	2007
Asian Junior Championships	B

=== Individual competitions ===
- Junior level

Event	2009
Asian Junior Championships	B

- Senior level

Tournament	2018	Best
BWF World Tour
Thailand Masters	1R	1R (2016, 2017, 2018)
Year-end ranking	472	31

Tournament	2016	2017	Best
BWF Superseries
Singapore Open	A	1R	1R (2017)
Indonesia Open	2R	A	2R (2016)

Tournament	2010	2011	2012	2013	2014	2015	2016	2017	Best
BWF Grand Prix and Grand Prix Gold
Malaysia Masters	A			1R	1R	A		2R	R2 (2017)
Syed Modi International	2R	A	QF	NH	A				QF (2012)
Thailand Masters	NH						1R	1R	1R (2016, 2017)
Vietnam Open	A			1R	1R	A	1R	A	1R (2013, 2014, 2016)
Thailand Open	NH	A		2R	NH	A	1R	1R	2R (2013)
Indonesia Masters	A	1R	2R	QF	A	2R	1R	NH	QF (2013)
Year-end ranking	176	245	106	39	276	118	122	146	31
