= Suo Di =

Chinese badminton player (born 1993)

Suo Di 索敌
Personal information
- Born: 18 February 1993 (age 33) Pizhou, Xuzhou Jiangsu Province, China
- Height: 1.74 m (5 ft 9 in)
- Weight: 63 kg (139 lb)

Sport
- Country: China
- Sport: Badminton

Women's singles
- Highest ranking: 32 (16 January 2014)
- BWF profile
Medal record
Women's badminton
Representing China
East Asian Games
Gold medal – first place	2013 Tianjin	Women's team
Summer Universiade
Silver medal – second place	2013 Kazan	Mixed team
World Junior Championships
Gold medal – first place	2009 Alor Setar	Mixed team
Gold medal – first place	2010 Guadalajara	Mixed team
Bronze medal – third place	2009 Alor Setar	Girls' singles
Bronze medal – third place	2010 Guadalajara	Girls' singles
Asian Junior Championships
Gold medal – first place	2010 Kota Kinabalu	Girls' singles
Gold medal – first place	2010 Kota Kinabalu	Mixed team
Silver medal – second place	2009 Kuala Lumpur	Mixed team

Suo Di (Chinese: 索敌, born 18 February 1993) is a Chinese badminton player. She won gold at the 2010 Asian Junior Championships in the girls' singles event.

== Achievements ==
=== BWF World Junior Championships ===
Girls' singles
Year	Venue	Opponent	Score	Result
2009	Stadium Sultan Abdul Halim; Alor Setar, Malaysia	(Thailand) Ratchanok Intanon	14–21, 18–21	Bronze
2010	Domo del Code Jalisco; Guadalajara, Mexico	(Japan) Misaki Matsutomo	21–17, 20–22, 19–21	Bronze

=== Asian Junior Championships ===
Girls' singles
Year	Venue	Opponent	Score	Result
2010	Stadium Juara; Kuala Lumpur, Malaysia	(Thailand) Sapsiree Taerattanachai	21–13, 21–11	Gold

=== BWF Grand Prix ===
The BWF Grand Prix had two levels, the Grand Prix and Grand Prix Gold. It was a series of badminton tournaments sanctioned by the Badminton World Federation (BWF) and played between 2007 and 2017.

Women's singles
Year	Tournament	Opponent	Score	Result
2013	Indonesia Grand Prix Gold	(China) Yao Xue	21–12, 22–20	(gold) Winner

BWF Grand Prix Gold tournament
BWF Grand Prix tournament
