= Sayaka Sato =

Japanese badminton player

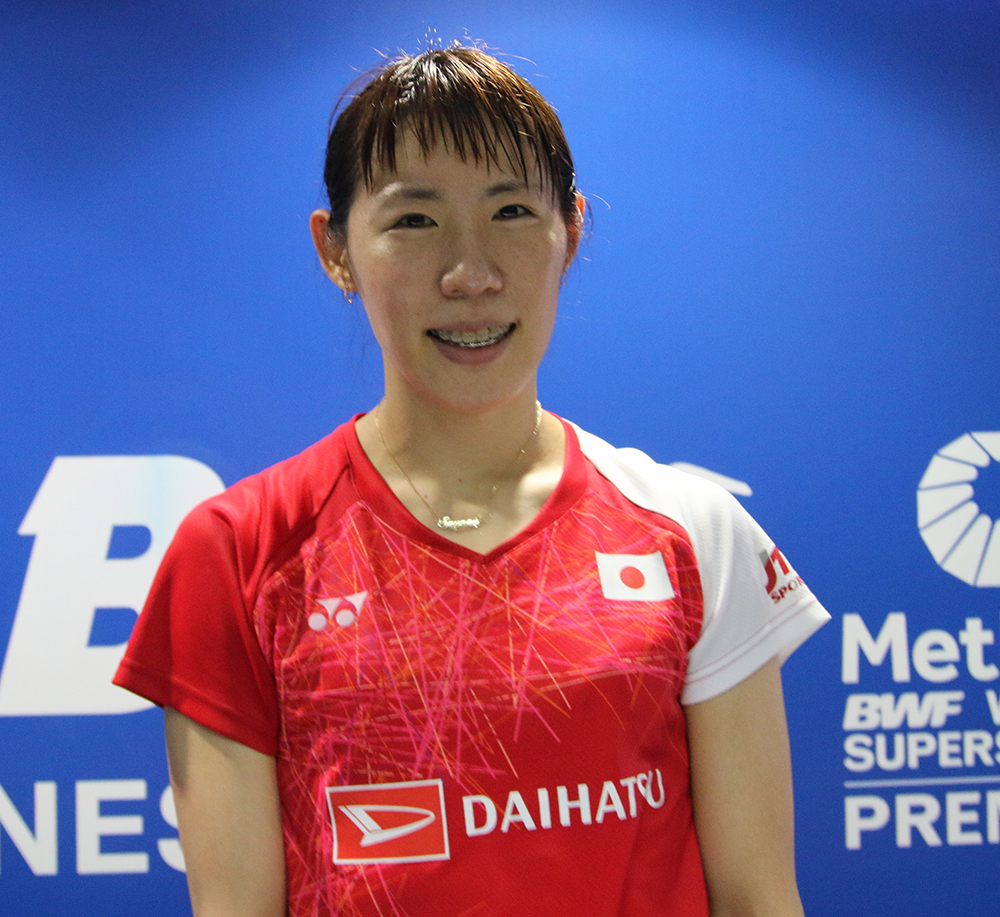

Personal information
- Born: 29 March 1991 (age 35) Sendai, Japan
- Height: 1.71 m (5 ft 7 in)
- Weight: 70 kg (154 lb)

Sport
- Country: Japan
- Sport: Badminton
- Handedness: Left

Women's singles
- Highest ranking: 12 (10 November 2016)
- BWF profile
Medal record
Women's badminton
Representing Japan
Uber Cup
Gold medal – first place	2018 Bangkok	Women's team
Bronze medal – third place	2010 Kuala Lumpur	Women's team
Bronze medal – third place	2012 Wuhan	Women's team
Bronze medal – third place	2016 Kunshan	Women's team
Asian Games
Gold medal – first place	2018 Jakarta–Palembang	Women's team
Asia Mixed Team Championships
Gold medal – first place	2017 Ho Chi Minh	Mixed team
Asia Team Championships
Gold medal – first place	2018 Alor Setar	Women's team
Silver medal – second place	2016 Hyderabad	Women's team
World Junior Championships
Silver medal – second place	2008 Pune	Girls' singles

Sayaka Sato (佐藤 冴香, Satō Sayaka; born 29 March 1991) is a Japanese badminton player. She competed for Japan at the 2012 Summer Olympics.

== Achievements ==
=== BWF World Junior Championships ===
Girls' singles
Year	Venue	Opponent	Score	Result
2008	Shree Shiv Chhatrapati Badminton Hall; Pune, India	(India) Saina Nehwal	9–21, 18–21	Silver

=== BWF Superseries ===
The BWF Superseries, launched on 14 December 2006 and implemented in 2007, is a series of elite badminton tournaments, sanctioned by Badminton World Federation (BWF). BWF Superseries has two level such as Superseries and Superseries Premier. A season of Superseries features twelve tournaments around the world, which introduced since 2011, with successful players invited to the Superseries Finals held at the year end.

Women's singles
Year	Tournament	Opponent	Score	Result
2010	Indonesia Open	(India) Saina Nehwal	19–21, 21–13, 11–21	(silver) Runner-up
2017	Indonesia Open	(South Korea) Sung Ji-hyun	21–13, 17–21, 21–14	(gold) Winner

BWF Super Series Premier tournament
BWF Super Series tournament

=== BWF Grand Prix ===
The BWF Grand Prix had two levels, the BWF Grand Prix and Grand Prix Gold. It was a series of badminton tournaments sanctioned by the Badminton World Federation (BWF) which was held from 2007 to 2017.

Women's singles
Year	Tournament	Opponent	Score	Result	Ref.
2009	New Zealand Open	(Indonesia) Maria Febe Kusumastuti	21–10, 21–16	(gold) Winner	
2011	U.S. Open	(Chinese Taipei) Tai Tzu-ying	16–21, 21–19, 6–21	(silver) Runner-up	
2014	Korea Grand Prix	(Japan) Nozomi Okuhara	17–21, 13–21	(silver) Runner-up	
2014	Scottish Open	(Spain) Beatriz Corrales	21–18, 21–9	(gold) Winner	
2015	U.S. Open	(Japan) Nozomi Okuhara	16–21, 14–21	(silver) Runner-up	
2015	Korea Masters	(China) Sun Yu	22–20, 21–19	(gold) Winner	
2015	Mexico City Grand Prix	(South Korea) Bae Yeon-ju	21–15, 21–9	(gold) Winner	
2016	Syed Modi International	(South Korea) Sung Ji-hyun	21–12, 18–21, 18–21	(silver) Runner-up	

BWF Grand Prix Gold tournament
BWF Grand Prix tournament

=== BWF International Challenge/Series ===
Women's singles
Year	Tournament	Opponent	Score	Result	Ref.
2008	Waikato International	(Japan) Ayaka Takahashi	11–21, 21–17, 26–28	(silver) Runner-up	
2008	North Shore City International	(Japan) Misaki Matsutomo	21–18, 22–20	(gold) Winner	
2011	New Zealand International	(Singapore) Gu Juan	21–14, 21–13	(gold) Winner	
2014	USA International	(Japan) Kaori Imabeppu	19–21, 20–22	(silver) Runner-up	
2015	Osaka International	(Japan) Sayaka Takahashi	11–21, 21–15, 27–29	(silver) Runner-up	

BWF International Challenge tournament
BWF International Series tournament
