= Ana Rovita =

Indonesian badminton player (born 1991)

Personal information
- Born: 30 March 1991 (age 35) Jepara, Central Java, Indonesia
- Height: 1.57 m (5 ft 2 in)

Sport
- Country: Indonesia
- Sport: Badminton
- Handedness: Right

Women's singles & doubles
- Highest ranking: 51 (WS 4 April 2011); 564 (WD 15 September 2016); 308 (XD 15 September 2016)
- BWF profile
Medal record
Women's badminton
Representing Indonesia
Asian Junior Championships
Bronze medal – third place	2009 Kuala Lumpur	Girls' singles

Ana Rovita (born 30 March 1991) is an Indonesian badminton player affiliated with Djarum club.

== Achievements ==
=== Asian Junior Championships ===
Girls' singles
Year	Venue	Opponent	Score	Result
2009	Stadium Juara; Kuala Lumpur, Malaysia	(China) Chen Xiaojia	22–24, 17–21	Bronze

=== BWF International Challenge/Series (1 title, 3 runners-up) ===
Women's singles
Year	Tournament	Opponent	Score	Result
2010	Brazil International	(Germany) Nicole Grether	25–23, 21–15	(gold) Winner
2013	Kharkiv International	(Indonesia) Febby Angguni	20–22, 14–21	(silver) Runner-up
2013	India International	(Indonesia) Febby Angguni	22–20, 14–21, 19–21	(silver) Runner-up
2014	USM Indonesia International	(Indonesia) Febby Angguni	14–21, 16–21	(silver) Runner-up

BWF International Challenge tournament
BWF International Series tournament
BWF Future Series tournament
