= Yao Xue =

Chinese badminton player

Yao Xue 姚雪
Personal information
- Born: 17 January 1991 (age 35) Jingzhou, Hubei, China
- Height: 1.74 m (5 ft 9 in)
- Weight: 64 kg (141 lb)

Sport
- Country: China
- Sport: Badminton

Women's singles
- Highest ranking: 16 (19 June 2014)
- BWF profile
Medal record
Women's badminton
Representing China
World Junior Championships
Gold medal – first place	2009 Alor Setar	Mixed team
Summer Universiade
Silver medal – second place	2013 Kazan	Mixed team
Bronze medal – third place	2013 Kazan	Women's singles

Yao Xue (Chinese: 姚雪, born 17 January 1991) is a Chinese badminton player.

== Career ==
Yao started playing badminton at the age of six. She trained in Shenzhen for two years. Yao with her excellent performance selected to Guangdong training team. A year later, she became a full member of the Guangdong team, also selected several national junior team. Her biggest achievement in the BWF Superseries event that is becoming the runner-up in the 2013 Malaysia Super Series in the women's singles event. In September 2013, she became the runner-up at the Indonesian Masters Grand Prix Gold tournament. In the final round, she defeated by her compatriot Suo Di with a tighter finish. Suo dominated the first game but she didn't give up so easily. She tried to steal the second game but came up just short in the end and was unable to take her first international title. She won her first international title at the 2014 Malaysia Grand Prix Gold tournament.

== Achievements ==
=== Summer Universiade ===
Women's singles
Year	Venue	Opponent	Score	Result
2013	Tennis Academy; Kazan, Russia	(South Korea) Sung Ji-hyun	10–21, 21–19, 14–21	Bronze

=== BWF Superseries ===
The BWF Superseries, which was launched on 14 December 2006 and implemented in 2007, is a series of elite badminton tournaments, sanctioned by the Badminton World Federation (BWF). BWF Superseries levels are Superseries and Superseries Premier. A season of Superseries consists of twelve tournaments around the world that have been introduced since 2011. Successful players are invited to the Superseries Finals, which are held at the end of each year.

Women's singles
Year	Tournament	Opponent	Score	Result
2013	Malaysia Open	(Chinese Taipei) Tai Tzu-ying	17–21, 14–21	(silver) Runner-up

BWF Super Series Finals tournament
BWF Super Series Premier tournament
BWF Super Series tournament

=== BWF Grand Prix ===
The BWF Grand Prix had two levels, the BWF Grand Prix and Grand Prix Gold. It was a series of badminton tournaments sanctioned by the Badminton World Federation (BWF) which was held from 2007 to 2017.

Women's singles
Year	Tournament	Opponent	Score	Result
2013	Indonesia Grand Prix Gold	(China) Suo Di	12–21, 20–22	(silver) Runner-up
2014	Malaysia Grand Prix Gold	(Indonesia) Adriyanti Firdasari	21–18, 21–18	(gold) Winner

BWF Grand Prix Gold tournament
BWF Grand Prix tournament
