= London Grand Prix Gold =

International badminton tournament

The London Grand Prix Gold is an open international badminton tournament held in London, England. This tournament has been a Grand Prix Gold level, with total prize money US$120,000.

== Previous winners ==
Year	Men's singles	Women's singles	Men's doubles	Women's doubles	Mixed doubles
2013	(China) Tian Houwei	(Spain) Carolina Marin	(Denmark) Mathias Boe (Denmark) Carsten Mogensen	(Denmark) Christinna Pedersen (Denmark) Kamilla Rytter Juhl	(Germany) Michael Fuchs (Germany) Birgit Michels
