= Alamsyah Yunus =

Indonesian badminton player (born 1986)

Personal information
- Born: 7 July 1986 (age 40) Jakarta, Indonesia
- Height: 1.65 m (5 ft 5 in)

Sport
- Country: Indonesia
- Sport: Badminton
- Handedness: Right

Men's singles
- Highest ranking: 17 (January 2011)
- BWF profile
Medal record
Men's badminton
Representing Indonesia
Summer Universiade
Bronze medal – third place	2007 Bangkok	Mixed team

Alamsyah Yunus (born 7 July 1986) is an Indonesian badminton player from JR Enkei Bekasi club.

== Career ==
In 2003, Yunus has won the national junior tournament, and in 2005 he was the runner-up at the National Championships. In 2007, he competed at the Summer Universiade, and won the mixed team bronze. Yunus has won some international tournament such as two times champion in 2010 and 2012 Indonesia International, and also 2010 and 2011 India International. At the Grand Prix level, he won the 2010 India Open and 2013 Malaysia Grand Prix Gold. Yunus also called as "King of Sirnas" after won some national series tournament.

== Achievements ==
=== BWF Grand Prix (2 titles, 1 runner-up) ===
The BWF Grand Prix had two levels, the BWF Grand Prix and Grand Prix Gold. It was a series of badminton tournaments sanctioned by the Badminton World Federation (BWF) which was held from 2007 to 2017.

Men's singles
Year	Tournament	Opponent	Score	Result	Ref.
2009	Australian Open	(Indonesia) Dionysius Hayom Rumbaka	17–21, 18–21	(silver) Runner-up	
2010	India Open	(India) R. M. V. Gurusaidutt	21–13, 21–18	(gold) Winner	
2013	Malaysia Grand Prix Gold	(Malaysia) Goh Soon Huat	10–21, 21–9, 21–19	(gold) Winner	

BWF Grand Prix Gold tournament
BWF Grand Prix tournament

=== BWF International Challenge/Series (5 titles, 5 runners-up) ===
Men's singles
Year	Tournament	Opponent	Score	Result	Ref.
2006	Thailand Satellite	(Indonesia) Tommy Sugiarto	5–21, 11–21	(silver) Runner-up	
2006	Surabaya Satellite	(Indonesia) Jeffer Rosobin	16–21, 19–21	(silver) Runner-up	
2006	Malaysia Satellite	(Indonesia) Jeffer Rosobin	21–14, 15–21, 20–22	(silver) Runner-up	
2010	Indonesia International	(Indonesia) Andre Kurniawan Tedjono	21–18, 21–10	(gold) Winner	
2010	India International	(Indonesia) Tommy Sugiarto	11–21, 21–13, 21–17	(gold) Winner	
2011	Indonesia International	(Indonesia) Tommy Sugiarto	15–21, 21–13, 15–21	(silver) Runner-up	
2011	Malaysia International	(Malaysia) Mohamad Arif Abdul Latif	21–12, 17–21, 21–14	(gold) Winner	
2011	India International	(India) R. M. V. Gurusaidutt	21–17, 24–22	(gold) Winner	
2012	Indonesia International	(Indonesia) Wisnu Yuli Prasetyo	20–22, 21–16, 21–10	(gold) Winner	
2013	Indonesia International	(Indonesia) Jonatan Christie	17–21, 10–21	(silver) Runner-up	

BWF International Challenge tournament
BWF International Series tournament
