= Deng Xuan =

Hong Kong badminton player (born 1992)

Deng Xuan 邓旋
Personal information
- Born: Joy Deng Xuan; 20 January 1992 (age 34) Guangzhou, Guangdong, China
- Height: 1.73 m (5 ft 8 in)

Sport
- Country: Hong Kong
- Sport: Badminton

Women's singles
- Highest ranking: 29 (14 November 2013)
- Current ranking: 196 (16 August 2022)
- BWF profile
Medal record
Women's badminton
Representing China
Youth Olympic Games
Silver medal – second place	2010 Singapore	Girls' singles
World Junior Championships
Gold medal – first place	2010 Guadalajara	Mixed team
Gold medal – first place	2009 Alor Setar	Mixed team
Asian Junior Championships
Gold medal – first place	2010 Kuala Lumpur	Mixed team
Bronze medal – third place	2010 Kuala Lumpur	Girls' singles

Joy Xuan Deng (Chinese: 邓旋, born 20 January 1992) is a Hong Kong badminton player. She started playing badminton in her hometown Guangzhou, and in 2010, Deng was selected to join the China national badminton team. In 2014, she retired from the China national badminton team, and in 2017, she started to represent Hong Kong.

== Achievements ==
=== Youth Olympic Games ===
Girls' singles
Year	Venue	Opponent	Score	Result
2010	Singapore Indoor Stadium, Singapore City, Singapore	(Thailand) Sapsiree Taerattanachai	14–21, 17–21	Silver

=== Asian Junior Championships ===
Girls' singles
Year	Venue	Opponent	Score	Result
2010	Stadium Juara; Kuala Lumpur, Malaysia	(Thailand) Sapsiree Taerattanachai	21–12, 7–21, 14–21	Bronze

=== BWF World Tour (1 runner-up) ===
The BWF World Tour, which was announced on 19 March 2017 and implemented in 2018, is a series of elite badminton tournaments sanctioned by the Badminton World Federation (BWF). The BWF World Tour is divided into levels of World Tour Finals, Super 1000, Super 750, Super 500, Super 300 (part of the HSBC World Tour), and the BWF Tour Super 100.

Women's singles
Year	Tournament	Level	Opponent	Score	Result
2018	Hyderabad Open	Super 100	(South Korea) Kim Ga-eun	9–21, 21–18, 17–21	(silver) Runner-up

=== BWF Grand Prix (1 title) ===
The BWF Grand Prix has two levels: Grand Prix and Grand Prix Gold. It is a series of badminton tournaments, sanctioned by Badminton World Federation (BWF) since 2007.

Women's singles
Year	Tournament	Opponent	Score	Result
2013	New Zealand Open	(Japan) Akane Yamaguchi	21–17, 18–21, 22–20	(gold) Winner

BWF Grand Prix Gold tournament
BWF Grand Prix tournament

=== BWF International Challenge/Series (4 titles) ===
Women's singles
Year	Tournament	Opponent	Score	Result
2018	White Nights	(Singapore) Yeo Jia Min	21–7, 13–21, 21–17	(gold) Winner
2018	Mongolia International	(Thailand) Chasinee Korepap	21–11, 21–8	(gold) Winner
2018	Slovak Open	(Chinese Taipei) Lin Hsiang-ti	21–11, 21–13	(gold) Winner
2017	Nepal International	(Iran) Soraya Aghaeihajiagha	21–12, 21–5	(gold) Winner

BWF International Challenge tournament
BWF International Series tournament
BWF Future Series tournament
