= 2015 Malaysia Super Series Premier =

Tournament details
- Dates: 31 March–5 April 2015
- Level: Super Series Premier
- Total prize money: US$500,000
- Venue: Putra Stadium, Bukit Jalil Sports Complex
- Location: Kuala Lumpur, Malaysia

Champions
- Men's singles: (China) Chen Long
- Women's singles: (Spain) Carolina Marín
- Men's doubles: (Indonesia) Mohammad Ahsan (Indonesia) Hendra Setiawan
- Women's doubles: (China) Luo Ying (China) Luo Yu
- Mixed doubles: (China) Zhang Nan (China) Zhao Yunlei

The 2015 Malaysia Super Series Premier was the third super series tournament of the 2015 BWF Super Series. The tournament took place in Kuala Lumpur, Malaysia from March 31–April 5, 2015 and had a total purse of $500,000. A qualification was held to fill four places in all five disciplines of the main draws.

== Men's singles ==
=== Seeds ===
1. (China) Chen Long (champion)
2. (Denmark) Jan Ø. Jørgensen (semi-finals)
3. (South Korea) Son Wan-ho (first round)
4. (India) Srikanth Kidambi (second round)
5. (China) Lin Dan (final)
6. (Denmark) Viktor Axelsen (first round)
7. (Chinese Taipei) Chou Tien-chen (first round)
8. (Denmark) Hans-Kristian Vittinghus (first round)

=== Top half ===
First Round
1	(China) Chen L	22	21
(Japan) T Ueda	20	16
(South Korea) Lee D-k	15	21	14
(India) K Parupalli	21	11	21
6	(Denmark) V Axelsen	17	21	16
(Hong Kong) Hu Y	21	13	21
Q3	(Thailand) B Ponsana	17	10
(Japan) K Momota	21	21
3	(South Korea) Son W-h	14	8
Q2	(China) Xue S	21	21
(Chinese Taipei) Hsu J-h	12	21	21
(Germany) M Zwiebler	21	15	15
7	(Chinese Taipei) Chou T-c	11	11
(China) Wang ZM	21	21
(Thailand) T Saensomboonsuk	21	15	21
(France) B Leverdez	15	21	15

Second Round
1	(China) Chen L	21	21
(India) K Parupalli	10	6
(Hong Kong) Hu Y	6	9
(Japan) K Momota	21	21
Q2	(China) Xue S	21	21
(Chinese Taipei) Hsu J-h	17	9
(China) Wang ZM	17	21	21
(Thailand) T Saensomboonsuk	21	10	8

Quarterfinals
1	(China) Chen L	21	21
(Japan) K Momota	16	11
Q2	(China) Xue S	16	16
(China) Wang ZM	21	21

Semifinals
1	(China) Chen L	21	21
(China) Wang ZM	18	16

=== Bottom half ===
First Round
(India) Prannoy H.S.	22	21
PFQ	(Republic of Ireland) S Evans	20	18
(Indonesia) T Sugiarto	0^{r}
5	(China) Lin D	2
Q1	(Malaysia) Z Zulkiffli	5	7
(China) Tian HW	21	21
(England) R Ouseph	10	21	22
4	(India) Srikanth K.	21	15	24
Q4	(Indonesia) D H Rumbaka	18	21	21
(Vietnam) Nguyen T M	21	11	14
(Hong Kong) Wei N	14	21	21
8	(Denmark) H-K Vittinghus	21	17	17
(Hong Kong) Wong W K	16	21	17
(Japan) K Tago	21	12	21
(South Korea) Lee H-i	11	17
2	(Denmark) J Ø Jørgensen	21	21

Second Round
(India) Prannoy H.S.	15	14
5	(China) Lin D	21	21
(China) Tian HW	21	21
4	(India) Srikanth K.	14	18
Q4	(Indonesia) D H Rumbaka	19	21	13
(Hong Kong) Wei N	21	18	21
(Japan) K Tago	7	10
2	(Denmark) J Ø Jørgensen	21	21

Quarterfinals
5	(China) Lin D	11	21	21
(China) Tian HW	21	16	13
(Hong Kong) Wei N	9	15
2	(Denmark) J Ø Jørgensen	21	21

Semifinals
5	(China) Lin D	14	21	21
2	(Denmark) J Ø Jørgensen	21	19	17

=== Finals ===
Semifinals
1	(China) Chen Long	21	21
(China) Wang Zhengming	18	16
5	(China) Lin Dan	14	21	21
2	(Denmark) Jan Ø. Jørgensen	21	19	17

Final
1	(China) Chen Long	20	21	21
5	(China) Lin Dan	22	13	11

== Women's singles ==
=== Seeds ===
1. (China) Li Xuerui (final)
2. (China) Wang Shixian (semi-finals)
3. (India) Saina Nehwal (semi-finals)
4. (South Korea) Sung Ji-hyun (second round)
5. (China) Wang Yihan (quarter-finals)
6. (Spain) Carolina Marín (champion)
7. (Chinese Taipei) Tai Tzu-ying (first round)
8. (Thailand) Ratchanok Intanon (second round)

=== Top half ===
First Round
1	(China) Li XR	21	24
(Denmark) L Kjaersfeldt	13	22
(Germany) K Schnaase	16	12
(Japan) A Yamaguchi	21	21
5	(China) Wang YH	21	14	21
PFQ	(Indonesia) B Manuputty	19	21	14
(United States) J Subandhi	12	19
(Chinese Taipei) Pai Y-p	21	21
3	(India) S Nehwal	21	21
(Indonesia) M F Kusumastuti	13	16
(Thailand) B Ongbumrungpan	11	21	15
Q4	(China) Yao X	21	11	21
7	(Chinese Taipei) Tai T-y	21	20	12
(United States) Zhang BW	18	22	21
Q1	(South Korea) Kim H-m	11	12
(China) Sun Y	21	21

Second Round
1	(China) Li XR	21	10	21
(Japan) A Yamaguchi	16	21	17
5	(China) Wang YH	21	21
(Chinese Taipei) Pai Y-p	13	7
3	(India) S Nehwal	21	21
Q4	(China) Yao X	13	9
(United States) Zhang BW	17	22	17
(China) Sun Y	21	20	21

Quarterfinals
1	(China) Li XR	14	21	21
5	(China) Wang YH	21	15	12
3	(India) S Nehwal	21	18	21
(China) Sun Y	11	21	17

Semifinals
1	(China) Li XR	13	21	22
3	(India) S Nehwal	21	17	20

=== Bottom half ===
First Round
(Chinese Taipei) Hsu Y-c	8	21	12
(United States) I Wang	21	17	21
(Indonesia) L Fanetri	16	8
6	(Spain) C Marín	21	21
Q2	(Chinese Taipei) Hung S-h	17	19
Q3	(Hong Kong) Cheung N Y	21	21
(Thailand) N Jindapon	11	21	16
4	(South Korea) Sung J-h	21	13	21
(Hong Kong) Yip P Y	11	9
(Japan) N Okuhara	21	21
(Japan) M Mitani	19	21	11
8	(Thailand) R Intanon	21	17	21
(Vietnam) Vu T T	19	14
(Thailand) P Buranaprasertsuk	21	21
(South Korea) Bae Y-j	17	12
2	(China) Wang SX	21	21

Second Round
(United States) I Wang	15	19
6	(Spain) C Marín	21	21
Q3	(Hong Kong) Cheung N Y	21	12	21
4	(South Korea) Sung J-h	18	21	12
(Japan) N Okuhara	21	21
8	(Thailand) R Intanon	12	11
(Thailand) P Buranaprasertsuk	12	11
2	(China) Wang SX	21	21

Quarterfinals
6	(Spain) C Marín	21	21
Q3	(Hong Kong) Cheung N Y	12	9
(Japan) N Okuhara	19	21	20
2	(China) Wang SX	21	15	22

Semifinals
6	(Spain) C Marín	21	24
2	(China) Wang SX	17	22

=== Finals ===
Semifinals
1	(China) Li Xuerui	13	21	22
3	(India) Saina Nehwal	21	17	20
6	(Spain) Carolina Marín	21	24
2	(China) Wang Shixian	17	22

Final
1	(China) Li Xuerui	21	19	17
6	(Spain) Carolina Marín	19	21	21

== Men's doubles ==
=== Seeds ===
1. (South Korea) Lee Yong-dae / Yoo Yeon-seong (final)
2. (Denmark) Mathias Boe / Carsten Mogensen (semi-finals)
3. (Chinese Taipei) Lee Sheng-mu / Tsai Chia-hsin (semi-finals)
4. (Indonesia) Mohammad Ahsan / Hendra Setiawan (champions)
5. (Japan) Hiroyuki Endo / Kenichi Hayakawa (quarter-finals)
6. (China) Chai Biao / Hong Wei (quarter-finals)
7. (China) Liu Xiaolong / Qiu Zihan (quarter-finals)
8. (South Korea) Kim Ki-jung / Kim Sa-rang (second round)

=== Top half ===
First Round
1	(South Korea) Lee Y-d (South Korea) Yoo Y-s	21	21
(China) Kang J (China) Liu C	7	14
(China) Fu HF (China) Zhang N	13	12
(South Korea) Choi S-k (South Korea) Ko S-h	21	21
7	(China) Liu XL (China) Qiu ZH	24	21
(Germany) M Schwenger (Germany) J Zurwonne	22	19
(Singapore) D B Chrisnanta (Singapore) C Triyachart	21	18	21
(Indonesia) W Nayaka (Indonesia) A Yusuf	12	21	16
3	(Chinese Taipei) Lee S-m (Chinese Taipei) Tsai C-h	21	11	21
(Japan) H Hashimoto (Japan) N Hirata	15	21	17
(Denmark) A S Rasmussen (Denmark) K Astrup	21	21
(United States) P Chew (United States) S Pongnairat	10	10
6	(China) Chai B (China) Hong W	21	15	21
(Malaysia) Goh V S (Malaysia) Tan W K	18	21	14
Q3	(Chinese Taipei) Liao M-c (Chinese Taipei) Tseng M-h	10	12
(Denmark) M Conrad-Petersen (Denmark) M Pieler Kolding	21	21

Second Round
1	(South Korea) Lee Y-d (South Korea) Yoo Y-s	21	21
(South Korea) Choi S-k (South Korea) Ko S-h	17	9
7	(China) Liu XL (China) Qiu ZH	23	21
(Singapore) D B Chrisnanta (Singapore) C Triyachart	21	18
3	(Chinese Taipei) Lee S-m (Chinese Taipei) Tsai C-h	19	21	21
(Denmark) A S Rasmussen (Denmark) K Astrup	21	16	18
6	(China) Chai B (China) Hong W	23	21
(Denmark) M Conrad-Petersen (Denmark) M Pieler Kolding	21	15

Quarterfinals
1	(South Korea) Lee Y-d (South Korea) Yoo Y-s	21	21
7	(China) Liu XL (China) Qiu ZH	18	19
3	(Chinese Taipei) Lee S-m (Chinese Taipei) Tsai C-h	17	21	21
6	(China) Chai B (China) Hong W	21	17	16

Semifinals
1	(South Korea) Lee Y-d (South Korea) Yoo Y-s	21	20	22
3	(Chinese Taipei) Lee S-m (Chinese Taipei) Tsai C-h	15	22	20

=== Bottom half ===
First Round
Q1	(Indonesia) M Kido (Indonesia) A P R Putra	21	20	23
Q4	(Thailand) T Potieng (Thailand) N Puangpuapech	15	22	21
(Russia) V Ivanov (Russia) I Sozonov	15	20
5	(Japan) H Endo (Japan) K Hayakawa	21	22
(India) M Attri (India) S Reddy B	11	17
(Indonesia) A Adistia (Indonesia) H A Gunawan	21	21
(China) Cai Y (China) Lu K	20	12
4	(Indonesia) M Ahsan (Indonesia) H Setiwan	22	21
(China) Wang YL (China) Zhang W	18	12
(Indonesia) A Pratama (Indonesia) R K Suwardi	21	21
(Japan) T Kamura (Japan) K Sonoda	17	12
8	(South Korea) Kim K-j (South Korea) Kim S-r	21	21
Q2	(Chinese Taipei) Chen H-l (Chinese Taipei) Wang C-l	21	19	21
(England) M Ellis (England) C Langridge	14	21	18
(Indonesia) M F Gideon (Indonesia) K S Sukamuljo	22	13	15
2	(Denmark) M Boe (Denmark) C Mogensen	20	21	21

Second Round
Q1	(Indonesia) M Kido (Indonesia) A P R Putra	21	18	18
5	(Japan) H Endo (Japan) K Hayakawa	19	21	21
(Indonesia) A Adistia (Indonesia) H A Gunawan	18	18
4	(Indonesia) M Ahsan (Indonesia) H Setiwan	21	21
(Indonesia) A Pratama (Indonesia) R K Suwardi	14	21	21
8	(South Korea) Kim K-j (South Korea) Kim S-r	21	12	12
Q2	(Chinese Taipei) Chen H-l (Chinese Taipei) Wang C-l	11	11
2	(Denmark) M Boe (Denmark) C Mogensen	21	21

Quarterfinals
5	(Japan) H Endo (Japan) K Hayakawa	21	13	12
4	(Indonesia) M Ahsan (Indonesia) H Setiwan	10	21	21
(Indonesia) A Pratama (Indonesia) R K Suwardi	21	21	11
2	(Denmark) M Boe (Denmark) C Mogensen	23	14	21

Semifinals
4	(Indonesia) M Ahsan (Indonesia) H Setiwan	21	18	21
2	(Denmark) M Boe (Denmark) C Mogensen	16	21	16

=== Finals ===
Semifinals
1	(South Korea) Lee Yong-dae (South Korea) Yoo Yeon-seong	21	20	22
3	(Chinese Taipei) Lee Sheng-mu (Chinese Taipei) Tsai Chia-hsin	15	22	20
4	(Indonesia) Mohammad Ahsan (Indonesia) Hendra Setiawan	21	18	21
2	(Denmark) Mathias Boe (Denmark) Carsten Mogensen	16	21	16

Final
1	(South Korea) Lee Yong-dae (South Korea) Yoo Yeon-seong	21	15	21
4	(Indonesia) Mohammad Ahsan (Indonesia) Hendra Setiawan	14	21	23

== Women's doubles ==
=== Seeds ===
1. (Japan) Misaki Matsutomo / Ayaka Takahashi (first round)
2. (Denmark) Christinna Pedersen / Kamilla Rytter Juhl (first round)
3. (China) Luo Ying / Luo Yu (champions)
4. (Japan) Reika Kakiiwa / Miyuki Maeda (first round)
5. (China) Wang Xiaoli / Yu Yang (second round)
6. (Indonesia) Nitya Krishinda Maheswari / Greysia Polii (quarter-finals)
7. (South Korea) Lee So-hee / Shin Seung-chan (first round)
8. (China) Xia Huan / Tian Qing (semi-finals)

=== Top half ===
First Round
1	(Japan) M Matsutomo (Japan) A Takahashi	21	18	14
(China) Ou DN (China) Yu XH	17	21	21
Q4	(Indonesia) G R Imawan (Indonesia) T R Nuraidah	21	21
Q2	(Chinese Taipei) Hsu Y-c (Chinese Taipei) Pai Y-p	17	7
7	(South Korea) Lee S-h (South Korea) Shin S-c	21	13	14
Q1	(Germany) I Herttrich (Germany) B Michels	14	21	21
(Netherlands) S Barning (Netherlands) I Tabeling	13	17
(Malaysia) A A Anscelly (Malaysia) Soong F C	21	21
3	(China) Luo Y (China) Luo Y	19	21	21
(South Korea) Chae Y-j (South Korea) Kim S-y	21	11	16
(Indonesia) D Fitriani (Indonesia) N Melati	16	11
(China) Bao YX (China) Tang JH	21	21
6	(Indonesia) N K Maheswari (Indonesia) G Polii	21	21
(Singapore) V Neo Y Y (Singapore) S M Sari	14	15
(Indonesia) K N Hanadia (Indonesia) D T Permatasari	14	21	16
(India) J Gutta (India) A Ponnappa	21	18	21

Second Round
(China) Ou DN (China) Yu XH	21	21
Q4	(Indonesia) G R Imawan (Indonesia) T R Nuraidah	19	15
Q1	(Germany) I Herttrich (Germany) B Michels	16	21	21
(Malaysia) A A Anscelly (Malaysia) Soong F C	21	17	14
3	(China) Luo Y (China) Luo Y	21	21
(China) Bao YX (China) Tang JH	12	15
6	(Indonesia) N K Maheswari (Indonesia) G Polii	21	21	21
(India) J Gutta (India) A Ponnappa	23	8	17

Quarterfinals
(China) Ou DN (China) Yu XH	21	21
Q1	(Germany) I Herttrich (Germany) B Michels	13	8
3	(China) Luo Y (China) Luo Y	21	21
6	(Indonesia) N K Maheswari (Indonesia) G Polii	12	19

Semifinals
(China) Ou DN (China) Yu XH	21	19	9
3	(China) Luo Y (China) Luo Y	17	21	21

=== Bottom half ===
First Round
(Netherlands) E Muskens (Netherlands) S Piek	21	21
(Hong Kong) Chan T K (Hong Kong) Tse Y S	18	15
(Japan) N Fukuman (Japan) K Yonao	13	21	17
5	(China) Wang XL (China) Yu Y	21	16	21
(Thailand) D Aroonkesorn (Thailand) K Voravichitchaikul	16	11
(South Korea) Go A-r (South Korea) Yoo H-w	21	21
(South Korea) Chang Y-n (South Korea) Jung K-e	21	15	21
4	(Japan) R Kakiiwa (Japan) M Maeda	14	21	19
(Indonesia) P Z Bernadeth (Indonesia) R A Pradipta	21	24
(Malaysia) Lim YL (Malaysia) Lee MY	8	22
(Germany) J Goliszewski (Germany) C Nelte	9	16
8	(China) Xia H (China) Tian Q	21	21
(Thailand) P Supajirakul (Thailand) S Taerattanachai	21	17	16
(Malaysia) V Hoo K M (Malaysia) Woon KW	17	21	21
Q3	(Indonesia) A S Awanda (Indonesia) N K M Istirani	21	21
2	(Denmark) C Pedersen (Denmark) K Rytter Juhl	18	9

Second Round
(Netherlands) E Muskens (Netherlands) S Piek	21	0
5	(China) Wang XL (China) Yu Y	17	0^{r}
(South Korea) Go A-r (South Korea) Yoo H-w	15	17
(South Korea) Chang Y-n (South Korea) Jung K-e	21	21
(Indonesia) P Z Bernadeth (Indonesia) R A Pradipta	15	13
8	(China) Xia H (China) Tian Q	21	21
(Malaysia) V Hoo K M (Malaysia) Woon KW	21	18	21
Q3	(Indonesia) A S Awanda (Indonesia) N K M Istirani	9	21	18

Quarterfinals
(Netherlands) E Muskens (Netherlands) S Piek	20	15
(South Korea) Chang Y-n (South Korea) Jung K-e	22	21
8	(China) Xia H (China) Tian Q	21	21
(Malaysia) V Hoo K M (Malaysia) Woon KW	3	10

Semifinals
(South Korea) Chang Y-n (South Korea) Jung K-e	24	21
8	(China) Xia H (China) Tian Q	22	15

=== Finals ===
Semifinals
(China) Ou Dongni (China) Yu Xiaohan	21	19	9
3	(China) Luo Ying (China) Luo Yu	17	21	21
(South Korea) Chang Ye-na (South Korea) Jung Kyung-eun	24	21
8	(China) Xia Huan (China) Tian Qing	22	15

Final
3	(China) Luo Ying (China) Luo Yu	21	21
(South Korea) Chang Ye-na (South Korea) Jung Kyung-eun	18	9

== Mixed doubles ==
=== Seeds ===
1. (China) Zhang Nan / Zhao Yunlei (champions)
2. (Denmark) Joachim Fischer Nielsen / Christinna Pedersen (quarter-finals)
3. (China) Xu Chen / Ma Jin (final)
4. (Indonesia) Tontowi Ahmad / Liliyana Natsir (semi-finals)
5. (England) Chris Adcock / Gabrielle Adcock (quarter-finals)
6. (South Korea) Ko Sung-hyun / Kim Ha-na (quarter-finals)
7. (China) Liu Cheng / Bao Yixin (semi-finals)
8. (Indonesia) Riky Widianto / Richi Puspita Dili (first round)

=== Top half ===
First Round
1	(China) Zhang N (China) Zhao YL	21	21
(Netherlands) J De Ruitter (Netherlands) S Barning	15	10
(Netherlands) J Arends (Netherlands) S Piek	21	21
Q2	(Chinese Taipei) Tseng M-h (Chinese Taipei) Lai C-w	8	16
6	(South Korea) Ko S-h (South Korea) Kim H-n	21	23
(Germany) M Fuchs (Germany) B Michels	15	21
(Indonesia) P Jordan (Indonesia) D Susanto	21	21	21
(Hong Kong) Lee C H (Hong Kong) Chau H W	18	23	23
4	(Indonesia) T Ahmad (Indonesia) L Natsir	21	21
(Hong Kong) Chan Y L (Hong Kong) Tse Y S	14	10
Q4	(Japan) K Sonoda (Japan) N Fukuman	13	21	21
Q1	(Indonesia) A Adistia (Indonesia) V Marissa	21	13	19
5	(England) C Adcock (England) G Adcock	21	21
(Singapore) D B Chrisnanta (Singapore) V Neo Y Y	5	11
(Indonesia) E Subaktiar (Indonesia) G E Widjaja	21	21
(United States) P Chew (United States) J Subandhi	16	19

Second Round
1	(China) Zhang N (China) Zhao YL	21	21
(Netherlands) J Arends (Netherlands) S Piek	14	14
6	(South Korea) Ko S-h (South Korea) Kim H-n	25	21
(Hong Kong) Lee C H (Hong Kong) Chau H W	23	14
4	(Indonesia) T Ahmad (Indonesia) L Natsir	21	21
Q4	(Japan) K Sonoda (Japan) N Fukuman	18	11
5	(England) C Adcock (England) G Adcock	21	21
(Indonesia) E Subaktiar (Indonesia) G E Widjaja	13	11

Quarterfinals
1	(China) Zhang N (China) Zhao YL	21	21
6	(South Korea) Ko S-h (South Korea) Kim H-n	14	19
4	(Indonesia) T Ahmad (Indonesia) L Natsir	21	12	21
5	(England) C Adcock (England) G Adcock	17	21	13

Semifinals
1	(China) Zhang N (China) Zhao YL	21	14	21
4	(Indonesia) T Ahmad (Indonesia) L Natsir	19	21	11

=== Bottom half ===
First Round
(Indonesia) I Fadhilah (Indonesia) W Anggraini	12	16
(Thailand) N Puangpuapech (Thailand) P Supajirakul	21	21
(Denmark) M Pieler Kolding (Denmark) K Rytter Juhl	20	21	21
8	(Indonesia) R Widianto (Indonesia) R P Dili	22	15	11
(Germany) M Schwenger (Germany) C Nelte	21	18	11
(South Korea) Choi S-k (South Korea) Chae Y-j	18	21	21
Q3	(Malaysia) Wong F Y (Malaysia) Chow M K	13	8
3	(China) Xu C (China) Ma J	21	21
(Indonesia) M Kido (Indonesia) P Z Bernadeth	21	21
(Denmark) N Nohr (Denmark) S Thygesen	16	12
(South Korea) Kim K-j (South Korea) Shin S-c	21	17	13
7	(China) Liu C (China) Bao YX	14	21	21
(Japan) K Hayakawa (Japan) M Matsutomo	13	10
(China) Lu K (China) Huang YQ	21	21
PFQ	(Singapore) C Triyachart (Singapore) S M Sari	14	21	14
2	(Denmark) J Fischer Nielsen (Denmark) C Pedersen	21	18	21

Second Round
(Thailand) N Puangpuapech (Thailand) P Supajirakul	17	17
(Denmark) M Pieler Kolding (Denmark) K Rytter Juhl	21	21
(South Korea) Choi S-k (South Korea) Chae Y-j	10	18
3	(China) Xu C (China) Ma J	21	21
(Indonesia) M Kido (Indonesia) P Z Bernadeth	21	16
7	(China) Liu C (China) Bao YX	23	21
(China) Lu K (China) Huang YQ	15	21	19
2	(Denmark) J Fischer Nielsen (Denmark) C Pedersen	21	15	21

Quarterfinals
(Denmark) M Pieler Kolding (Denmark) K Rytter Juhl	17	21	17
3	(China) Xu C (China) Ma J	21	16	21
7	(China) Liu C (China) Bao YX	21	21
2	(Denmark) J Fischer Nielsen (Denmark) C Pedersen	18	13

Semifinals
3	(China) Xu C (China) Ma J	w	/	o
7	(China) Liu C (China) Bao YX

=== Finals ===
Semifinals
1	(China) Zhang Nan (China) Zhao Yunlei	21	14	21
4	(Indonesia) Tontowi Ahmad (Indonesia) Liliyana Natsir	19	21	11
3	(China) Xu Chen (China) Ma Jin	w	/	o
7	(China) Liu Cheng (China) Bao Yixin

Final
1	(China) Zhang Nan (China) Zhao Yunlei	21	21
3	(China) Xu Chen (China) Ma Jin	16	14

Preceded by 2014 Malaysia Super Series Premier	Malaysia Open	Succeeded by 2016 Malaysia Super Series Premier
Preceded by 2015 India Super Series	BWF Super Series; 2015 BWF Season	Succeeded by 2015 Singapore Super Series
