= 2015 Singapore Super Series =

Tournament details
- Dates: 7 April 2015– 12 April 2015
- Edition: 66th
- Level: Super Series
- Total prize money: US$300,000
- Venue: Singapore Indoor Stadium
- Location: Kallang, Singapore

Champions
- Men's singles: (Japan) Kento Momota
- Women's singles: (China) Sun Yu
- Men's doubles: (Indonesia) Angga Pratama (Indonesia) Ricky Karanda Suwardi
- Women's doubles: (China) Ou Dongni (China) Yu Xiaohan
- Mixed doubles: (China) Zhang Nan (China) Zhao Yunlei

The 2015 Singapore Super Series was the fourth Super Series tournament of the 2015 BWF Super Series. The tournament took place in Singapore from April 7–12, 2015 with a total purse of $300,000. A qualification occurred to fill four places in all five disciplines of the main draws

== Men's singles ==
=== Seeds ===
1. (China) Chen Long
2. (Denmark) Jan Ø. Jørgensen
3. (India) Srikanth Kidambi
4. (South Korea) Son Wan-ho
5. (Denmark) Viktor Axelsen
6. (Chinese Taipei) Chou Tien-chen
7. (Denmark) Hans-Kristian Vittinghus
8. (Indonesia) Tommy Sugiarto (withdrew)

=== Top half ===
First Round
1	(China) Chen L	21	21
(South Korea) Lee D-k	10	13
(Hong Kong) Hu Y	21	21
(Japan) K Tago	15	5
PFQ	(Indonesia) D H Rumbaka	21	21
PFQ	(Malaysia) Chong W F	12	13
(Chinese Taipei) Hsu J-h	18	14
(China) Tian HW	21	21
4	(South Korea) Son W-h	16	21	21
Q2	(India) R.M.V.Gurusaidutt	21	12	15
(India) K Parupalli	21	21
(South Korea) Lee H-i	11	13
7	(Denmark) H-K Vittinghus	21	22
(Japan) T Ueda	18	20
(France) B Leverdez	14	21	21
(Hong Kong) Ng KL	21	17	17

Second Round
1	(China) Chen L	21	17	18
(Hong Kong) Hu Y	12	21	21
PFQ	(Indonesia) D H Rumbaka	21	6	18
(China) Tian HW	16	21	21
4	(South Korea) Son W-h	15	20
(India) K Parupalli	21	22
7	(Denmark) H-K Vittinghus	13	21	18
(France) B Leverdez	21	19	21

Quarterfinals
(Hong Kong) Hu Y	17	21	21
(China) Tian HW	21	18	10
(India) K Parupalli	21	21
(France) B Leverdez	6	17

Semifinals
(Hong Kong) Hu Y	20	21	21
(India) K Parupalli	22	11	14

=== Bottom half ===
First Round
Q4	(Malaysia) M A Abdul Latif	14	14
Q1	(Indonesia) S Santoso	21	21
(England) R Ouseph	17	15
5	(Denmark) V Axelsen	21	21
(Thailand) T Saensomboonsuk	21	17	21
(Germany) M Zwiebler	19	21	12
(Vietnam) Nguyen T M	18	21	14
3	(India) Srikanth K.	21	19	21
(Japan) K Momota	21	21
(Hong Kong) Wei N	13	12
(Republic of Ireland) S Evans	20	21	11
6	(Chinese Taipei) Chou T-c	22	12	21
(India) Prannoy H.S.	21	21
(Hong Kong) Wong W K	15	17
Q3	(India) B.S Praneeth	11	18
2	(Denmark) J Ø Jørgensen	21	21

Second Round
Q1	(Indonesia) S Santoso	21	16	21
5	(Denmark) V Axelsen	17	21	12
(Thailand) T Saensomboonsuk	21	22
3	(India) Srikanth K.	15	20
(Japan) K Momota	21	21
6	(Chinese Taipei) Chou T-c	17	15
(India) Prannoy H.S.	21	21
2	(Denmark) J Ø Jørgensen	16	8

Quarterfinals
Q1	(Indonesia) S Santoso	21	21
(Thailand) T Saensomboonsuk	10	19
(Japan) K Momota	W	/	O
(India) Prannoy H.S.

Semifinals
Q1	(Indonesia) S Santoso	10	13
(Japan) K Momota	21	21

=== Finals ===
Semifinals
(Hong Kong) Hu Yun	20	21	21
(India) Kashyap Parupalli	22	11	14
Q1	(Indonesia) Simon Santoso	10	13
(Japan) Kento Momota	21	21

Final
(Hong Kong) Hu Yun	17	21	15
(Japan) Kento Momota	21	16	21

== Women's singles ==
=== Seeds ===
1. (India) Saina Nehwal (withdrawn)
2. (China) Wang Shixian
3. (South Korea) Sung Ji-hyun
4. (China) Wang Yihan
5. (Chinese Taipei) Tai Tzu-ying
6. (Thailand) Ratchanok Intanon
7. (India) Pusarla Venkata Sindhu
8. (South Korea) Bae Yeon-ju

=== Top half ===
First Round
PFQ	(Indonesia) M F Kusumastuti	19	21	21
(Germany) K Schnaase	21	5	10
(Denmark) L Kjaersfeldt	21	21
(India) P.C. Thulasi	16	14
5	(Chinese Taipei) Tai T-y	21	21
(Thailand) P Buranaprasertsuk	13	13
(Singapore) Chen JY	22	18	21
(United States) I Wang	20	21	15
4	(China) Wang YH	21	21
PFQ	(Vietnam) Vu T T	13	11
(Hong Kong) Yip P Y	18	15
(United States) Zhang BW	21	21
6	(Thailand) R Intanon	21	21
Q4	(Indonesia) R A Riodingin	7	5
(Indonesia) L Fanetri	9	21	21
(Japan) M Mitani	21	13	13

Second Round
PFQ	(Indonesia) M F Kusumastuti	21	21
(Denmark) L Kjaersfeldt	17	19
5	(Chinese Taipei) Tai T-y	21	21
(Singapore) Chen JY	14	17
4	(China) Wang YH	11	21	21
(United States) Zhang BW	21	9	16
6	(Thailand) R Intanon	21	21
(Indonesia) L Fanetri	10	15

Quarterfinals
PFQ	(Indonesia) M F Kusumastuti	10	14
5	(Chinese Taipei) Tai T-y	21	21
4	(China) Wang YH	10	21	21
6	(Thailand) R Intanon	21	19	12

Semifinals
5	(Chinese Taipei) Tai T-y	21	9	21
4	(China) Wang YH	16	21	14

=== Bottom half ===
First Round
Q3	(Malaysia) Tee J Y	10	9
(China) Sun Y	21	21
Q1	(Japan) Y Hashimoto	17	21	18
PFQ	(Indonesia) B Manuputty	21	12	21
(Indonesia) A Firdasari	10	12
(Japan) N Okuhara	21	21
(Chinese Taipei) Hsu Y-c	10	11
3	(South Korea) Sung J-h	21	21
(Thailand) B Ongbumrungpan	15	13
(Japan) A Yamaguchi	21	21
(Thailand) N Jindapon	17	18
8	(South Korea) Bae Y-j	21	21
Q2	(Indonesia) R Hartawan	18	21	10
(Chinese Taipei) Pai Y-p	21	10	21
(Scotland) K Gilmour	16	10
2	(China) Wang SX	21	21

Second Round
(China) Sun Y	21	21
PFQ	(Indonesia) B Manuputty	14	18
(Japan) N Okuhara	23	21
3	(South Korea) Sung J-h	21	9
(Japan) A Yamaguchi	21	21
8	(South Korea) Bae Y-j	18	17
(Chinese Taipei) Pai Y-p	17	14
2	(China) Wang SX	21	21

Quarterfinals
(China) Sun Y	21	22
(Japan) N Okuhara	17	20
(Japan) A Yamaguchi	18	18
2	(China) Wang SX	21	21

Semifinals
(China) Sun Y	21	11	21
2	(China) Wang SX	14	21	19

=== Finals ===
Semifinals
5	(Chinese Taipei) Tai Tzu-ying	21	9	21
4	(China) Wang Yihan	16	21	14
(China) Sun Yu	21	11	21
2	(China) Wang Shixian	14	21	19

Final
5	(Chinese Taipei) Tai Tzu-ying	13	21	20
(China) Sun Yu	21	19	22

== Men's doubles ==
=== Seeds ===
1. (South Korea) Lee Yong-dae / Yoo Yeon-seong
2. (Chinese Taipei) Lee Sheng-mu / Tsai Chia-hsin
3. (Japan) Hiroyuki Endo / Kenichi Hayakawa
4. (China) Chai Biao / Hong Wei
5. (China) Fu Haifeng / Zhang Nan
6. (Indonesia) Mohammad Ahsan / Hendra Setiawan
7. (Denmark) Mads Conrad-Petersen / Mads Pieler Kolding
8. (Russia) Vladimir Ivanov / Ivan Sozonov

=== Top half ===
First Round
1	(South Korea) Lee Y-d (South Korea) Yoo Y-s	23	21
(India) P J Chopra (India) A Dewalker	21	11
(Japan) H Hashimoto (Japan) N Hirata	21	13	21
Q1	(Indonesia) M Kido (Indonesia) A P R Putra	12	21	12
8	(Russia) V Ivanov (Russia) I Sozonov	25	15	20
(Denmark) A Skårup Rasmussen (Denmark) K Astrup Sorensen	23	21	22
(Indonesia) A Pratama (Indonesia) R K Suwardi	21	16	21
(Thailand) T Potieng (Thailand) N Puangpuapech	14	21	13
3	(Japan) H Endo (Japan) K Hayakawa	21	24
(China) Cai Y (China) Lu K	17	22
(South Korea) Kim K-j (South Korea) Kim S-r	21	21
(Singapore) D B Chrisnanta (Singapore) C Triyachart	19	19
7	(Denmark) M Conrad-Petersen (Denmark) M Pieler Kolding	21	21
(Hong Kong) Chan Y L (Hong Kong) Lee C H	17	13
(England) M Ellis (England) C Langridge	15	21	21
(Germany) R Beck (Germany) A Heinz	21	19	17

Second Round
1	(South Korea) Lee Y-d (South Korea) Yoo Y-s	21	21
(Japan) H Hashimoto (Japan) N Hirata	11	18
(Denmark) A Skårup Rasmussen (Denmark) K Astrup Sorensen	17	21	19
(Indonesia) A Pratama (Indonesia) R K Suwardi	21	18	21
3	(Japan) H Endo (Japan) K Hayakawa	21	22
(South Korea) Kim K-j (South Korea) Kim S-r	15	20
7	(Denmark) M Conrad-Petersen (Denmark) M Pieler Kolding	21	21
(England) M Ellis (England) C Langridge	13	14

Quarterfinals
1	(South Korea) Lee Y-d (South Korea) Yoo Y-s	19	18
(Indonesia) A Pratama (Indonesia) R K Suwardi	21	21
3	(Japan) H Endo (Japan) K Hayakawa	17	21	21
7	(Denmark) M Conrad-Petersen (Denmark) M Pieler Kolding	21	13	18

Semifinals
(Indonesia) A Pratama (Indonesia) R K Suwardi	21	20	21
3	(Japan) H Endo (Japan) K Hayakawa	17	22	17

=== Bottom half ===
First Round
(South Korea) Choi S-k (South Korea) Ko S-h	13	21	21
Q3	(Singapore) T Hee YK (Singapore) H Wijaya	21	16	14
(Malaysia) Goh V S (Malaysia) Tan W K	21	15	14
6	(Indonesia) M Ahsan (Indonesia) H Setiwan	18	21	21
(Indonesia) W Nayaka (Indonesia) A Yusuf	21	21
Q4	(Indonesia) Y S Dasuki (Indonesia) D Juang	8	13
(Chinese Taipei) Chen H-l (Chinese Taipei) Wang C-l	17	14
4	(China) Chai B (China) Hong W	21	21
(China) Wang YL (China) Zhang W	21	21
(Indonesia) A Adistia (Indonesia) H A Gunawan	19	14
(Japan) T Kamura (Japan) K Sonoda	12	18
5	(China) Fu HF (China) Zhang N	21	21
(Chinese Taipei) Liao M-c (Chinese Taipei) Tseng M-h	17	13
(Indonesia) M F Gideon (Indonesia) K S Sukamuljo	21	21
Q2	(Malaysia) Chooi K M (Malaysia) Ow Y H	11	15
2	(Chinese Taipei) Lee S-m (Chinese Taipei) Tsai C-h	21	21

Second Round
(South Korea) Choi S-k (South Korea) Ko S-h	21	18	17
6	(Indonesia) M Ahsan (Indonesia) H Setiwan	19	21	21
(Indonesia) W Nayaka (Indonesia) A Yusuf	19	22	22
4	(China) Chai B (China) Hong W	21	20	20
(China) Wang YL (China) Zhang W	16	15
5	(China) Fu HF (China) Zhang N	21	21
(Indonesia) M F Gideon (Indonesia) K S Sukamuljo	26	21	19
2	(Chinese Taipei) Lee S-m (Chinese Taipei) Tsai C-h	28	18	21

Quarterfinals
6	(Indonesia) M Ahsan (Indonesia) H Setiwan	21	21
(Indonesia) W Nayaka (Indonesia) A Yusuf	12	16
5	(China) Fu HF (China) Zhang N	21	21	21
2	(Chinese Taipei) Lee S-m (Chinese Taipei) Tsai C-h	16	23	15

Semifinals
6	(Indonesia) M Ahsan (Indonesia) H Setiwan	21	8	17
5	(China) Fu HF (China) Zhang N	18	21	21

=== Finals ===
Semifinals
(Indonesia) Angga Pratama (Indonesia) Ricky Karanda Suwardi	21	20	21
3	(Japan) Hiroyuki Endo (Japan) Kenichi Hayakawa	17	22	17
6	(Indonesia) Mohammad Ahsan (Indonesia) Hendra Setiawan	21	8	17
5	(China) Fu Haifeng (China) Zhang Nan	18	21	21

Final
(Indonesia) Angga Pratama (Indonesia) Ricky Karanda Suwardi	21	11	21
5	(China) Fu Haifeng (China) Zhang Nan	15	21	14

== Women's doubles ==
=== Seeds ===
1. (Japan) Misaki Matsutomo / Ayaka Takahashi
2. (Japan) Reika Kakiiwa / Miyuki Maeda
3. (China) Wang Xiaoli / Yu Yang
4. (South Korea) Lee So-hee / Shin Seung-chan
5. (China) Xia Huan / Tian Qing
6. (China) Ou Dongni / Yu Xiaohan
7. (China) Huang Yaqiong / Ma Jin
8. (Netherlands) Eefje Muskens / Selena Piek

=== Top half ===
First Round
1	(Japan) M Matsutomo (Japan) A Takahashi	21	21
(Thailand) D Aroonkesorn (Thailand) K Voravichitchaikul	14	13
(Chinese Taipei) Chen H-h (Chinese Taipei) Lai C-w	17	14
(South Korea) Chae Y-j (South Korea) Kim S-y	21	21
5	(China) Xia H (China) Tian Q	21	21
(Hong Kong) Chan T K (Hong Kong) Tse Y S	16	19
(India) D Nair (India) M Sahdev	8	8
(Thailand) J Kittiharakul (Thailand) R Prajongjai	21	21
3	(China) Wang XL (China) Yu Y	21	21
(Malaysia) A A Anscelly (Malaysia) Soong F C	15	8
(South Korea) Go A-r (South Korea) Yoo H-w	12	16
(India) J Gutta (India) A Ponnappa	21	21
7	(China) Huang YQ (China) Ma J	21	22
Q4	(Indonesia) S R Andini (Indonesia) M D Giovani	12	20
(South Korea) Jang Y-n (South Korea) Jung K-e	21	21
(Chinese Taipei) Chiang K-h (Chinese Taipei) Wu F-c	13	11

Second Round
1	(Japan) M Matsutomo (Japan) A Takahashi	21	21
(South Korea) Chae Y-j (South Korea) Kim S-y	17	16
5	(China) Xia H (China) Tian Q	21	21
(Thailand) J Kittiharakul (Thailand) R Prajongjai	18	17
3	(China) Wang XL (China) Yu Y	24	21
(India) J Gutta (India) A Ponnappa	22	18
7	(China) Huang YQ (China) Ma J	22	8	21
(South Korea) Jang Y-n (South Korea) Jung K-e	20	21	11

Quarterfinals
1	(Japan) M Matsutomo (Japan) A Takahashi	21	21
5	(China) Xia H (China) Tian Q	15	19
3	(China) Wang XL (China) Yu Y	21	19	21
7	(China) Huang YQ (China) Ma J	17	21	15

Semifinals
1	(Japan) M Matsutomo (Japan) A Takahashi	11	21	21
3	(China) Wang XL (China) Yu Y	21	19	11

=== Bottom half ===
First Round
(Indonesia) K N Hanadia (Indonesia) D T Permatasari	23	21
(Chinese Taipei) Hsu Y-c (Chinese Taipei) Pai Y-p	21	18
Q1	(Indonesia) A Rahayu (Indonesia) J F Sugiarto	13	15
6	(China) Ou DN (China) Yu XH	21	21
(Indonesia) P Z Bernadeth (Indonesia) R A Pradipta	21	21
(India) P Gadre (India) N. S Reddy	17	13
Q3	(Singapore) Ong R N (Singapore) D Quek C Y	9	5
4	(South Korea) Lee S-h (South Korea) Shin S-c	21	21
(Indonesia) D Fitriani (Indonesia) N Melati	16	21	13
(Netherlands) S Barning (Netherlands) I Tabeling	21	15	21
Q2	(Thailand) C Chaladchalam (Thailand) P Muenwong	16	15
8	(Netherlands) E Muskens (Netherlands) S Piek	21	21
(Japan) N Fukuman (Japan) K Yonao	21	17	18
(Thailand) P Supajirakul (Thailand) S Taerattanachai	14	21	21
(Singapore) V Neo Y Y (Singapore) S M Sari	9	12
2	(Japan) R Kakiiwa (Japan) M Maeda	21	21

Second Round
(Indonesia) K N Hanadia (Indonesia) D T Permatasari	18	11
6	(China) Ou DN (China) Yu XH	21	21
(Indonesia) P Z Bernadeth (Indonesia) R A Pradipta	21	21
4	(South Korea) Lee S-h (South Korea) Shin S-c	18	17
(Netherlands) S Barning (Netherlands) I Tabeling	17	15
8	(Netherlands) E Muskens (Netherlands) S Piek	21	21
(Thailand) P Supajirakul (Thailand) S Taerattanachai	21	6	17
2	(Japan) R Kakiiwa (Japan) M Maeda	16	21	21

Quarterfinals
6	(China) Ou DN (China) Yu XH	21	21
(Indonesia) P Z Bernadeth (Indonesia) R A Pradipta	10	15
8	(Netherlands) E Muskens (Netherlands) S Piek	20	17
2	(Japan) R Kakiiwa (Japan) M Maeda	22	21

Semifinals
6	(China) Ou DN (China) Yu XH	21	22
2	(Japan) R Kakiiwa (Japan) M Maeda	18	20

=== Finals ===
Semifinals
1	(Japan) Misaki Matsutomo (Japan) Ayaka Takahashi	11	21	21
3	(China) Wang Xiaoli (China) Yu Yang	21	19	11
6	(China) Ou Dongni (China) Yu Xiaohan	21	22
2	(Japan) Reika Kakiiwa (Japan) Miyuki Maeda	18	20

Final
1	(Japan) Misaki Matsutomo (Japan) Ayaka Takahashi	17	16
6	(China) Ou Dongni (China) Yu Xiaohan	21	21

== Mixed doubles ==
=== Seeds ===
1. (China) Zhang Nan / Zhao Yunlei
2. (China) Xu Chen / Ma Jin
3. (Indonesia) Tantowi Ahmad / Lilyana Natsir
4. (England) Chris Adcock / Gabrielle Adcock
5. (South Korea) Ko Sung-hyun / Kim Ha-na
6. (China) Lu Kai / Huang Yaqiong
7. (Indonesia) Riky Widianto / Richi Puspita Dili
8. (Germany) Michael Fuchs / Birgit Michels

=== Top half ===
First Round
1	(China) Zhang N (China) Zhao YL	21	21
(Thailand) N Puangpuapech (Thailand) P Supajirakul	11	13
(Denmark) N Nohr (Denmark) S Thygesen	21	21
(India) P J Chopra (India) A Ponnappa	17	14
5	(South Korea) Ko S-h (South Korea) Kim H-n	21	21
Q4	(India) T Kona (India) N. S Reddy	15	17
Q1	(China) Wang YL (China) Xia H	18	14
(Netherlands) J De Ruitter (Netherlands) S Barning	21	21
3	(Indonesia) T Ahmad (Indonesia) L Natsir	21	21
Q3	(Malaysia) Lee J Y (Malaysia) Lim P Z	5	7
(Hong Kong) Lee C H (Hong Kong) Chau H W	21	21
(Singapore) C Triyachart (Singapore) S M Sari	15	11
7	(Indonesia) R Widianto (Indonesia) R P Dili	15	19
(South Korea) Choi S-k (South Korea) Chae Y-j	21	21
(Singapore) D B Chrisnanta (Singapore) V Neo Y Y	21	13	21
PFQ	(Chinese Taipei) Liao M-c (Chinese Taipei) Chen H-h	16	21	15

Second Round
1	(China) Zhang N (China) Zhao YL	21	21
(Denmark) N Nohr (Denmark) S Thygesen	18	13
5	(South Korea) Ko S-h (South Korea) Kim H-n	21	21
(Netherlands) J De Ruitter (Netherlands) S Barning	18	16
3	(Indonesia) T Ahmad (Indonesia) L Natsir	21	21
(Hong Kong) Lee C H (Hong Kong) Chau H W	12	19
(South Korea) Choi S-k (South Korea) Chae Y-j	22	14
(Singapore) D B Chrisnanta (Singapore) V Neo Y Y	24	21

Quarterfinals
1	(China) Zhang N (China) Zhao YL	21	21
5	(South Korea) Ko S-h (South Korea) Kim H-n	14	16
3	(Indonesia) T Ahmad (Indonesia) L Natsir	21	21
(Singapore) D B Chrisnanta (Singapore) V Neo Y Y	10	14

Semifinals
1	(China) Zhang N (China) Zhao YL	21	24
3	(Indonesia) T Ahmad (Indonesia) L Natsir	16	22

=== Bottom half ===
First Round
(Netherlands) J Arends (Netherlands) S Piek	18	14
(South Korea) Kim K-j (South Korea) Shin S-c	21	21
(Indonesia) A Adistia (Indonesia) V Marissa	17	22	11
6	(China) Lu K (China) Huang YQ	21	20	21
(Hong Kong) Chan Y L (Hong Kong) Tse Y S	21	19	21
(Singapore) T Hee YK (Singapore) Tan WH	13	21	14
(Chinese Taipei) Tseng M-h (Chinese Taipei) Lai C-w	12	16
4	(England) C Adcock (England) G Adcock	21	21
Q2	(Thailand) T Potieng (Thailand) J Kittiharakul	17	21	21
(Indonesia) I Fadhilah (Indonesia) W Anggraini	21	14	23
(India) A Dewalkar (India) P Gadre	12	17
8	(Germany) M Fuchs (Germany) B Michels	21	21
(Sweden) J Nordh (Sweden) E Fabbeke	21	6
(Indonesia) M Kido (Indonesia) P Z Bernadeth	23	21
(Indonesia) P Jordan (Indonesia) D Susanto	13	16
2	(China) Xu C (China) Ma J	21	21

Second Round
(South Korea) Kim K-j (South Korea) Shin S-c	21	14	13
6	(China) Lu K (China) Huang YQ	7	21	21
(Hong Kong) Chan Y L (Hong Kong) Tse Y S	13	18
4	(England) C Adcock (England) G Adcock	21	21
(Indonesia) I Fadhilah (Indonesia) W Anggraini	15	21	21
8	(Germany) M Fuchs (Germany) B Michels	21	18	18
(Indonesia) M Kido (Indonesia) P Z Bernadeth	9	17
2	(China) Xu C (China) Ma J	21	21

Quarterfinals
6	(China) Lu K (China) Huang YQ	21	20	21
4	(England) C Adcock (England) G Adcock	16	22	15
(Indonesia) I Fadhilah (Indonesia) W Anggraini	10	6
2	(China) Xu C (China) Ma J	21	21

Semifinals
6	(China) Lu K (China) Huang YQ	21	22
2	(China) Xu C (China) Ma J	17	20

=== Finals ===
Semifinals
1	(China) Zhang Nan (China) Zhao Yunlei	21	24
3	(Indonesia) Tontowi Ahmad (Indonesia) Lilyana Natsir	16	22
4	(China) Lu Kai (China) Huang Yaqiong	21	22
2	(China) Xu Chen (China) Ma Jin	17	20

Final
1	(China) Zhang Nan (China) Zhao Yunlei	W	/	O
4	(China) Lu Kai (China) Huang Yaqiong

Preceded by 2014 Singapore Super Series	Singapore Open	Succeeded by 2016 Singapore Super Series
Preceded by 2015 Malaysia Super Series Premier	BWF Superseries; 2015 BWF Season	Succeeded by 2015 Australian Super Series
