= 2015 Singapore Super Series Qualification =

Qualification for 2015 Singapore Super Series badminton competition was held on 7 April 2015.

== Men's singles ==
=== Seeds ===
1. (Indonesia) Dionysius Hayom Rumbaka (moved to first round)
2. (Malaysia) Chong Wei Feng (moved to first round)
3. (Thailand) Boonsak Ponsana
4. (India) B. Sai Praneeth

=== Qualifying draw ===
==== First qualifier ====
First round
(Malaysia) Liew Daren	13	21	17
(India) Ajay Jayaram	21	14	21
(Indonesia) Simon Santoso	21	21
(Denmark) Emil Holst	19	18

Qualifying competition
(India) Ajay Jayaram	16	18
(Indonesia) Simon Santoso	21	21

==== Second qualifier ====
First round
3	(Thailand) Boonsak Ponsana	21	18	18
(India) R. M. V. Gurusaidutt	18	21	21
(Chinese Taipei) Wang Tzu-wei	21	12	21
(Denmark) Joachim Persson	19	21	14

Qualifying competition
(India) R. M. V. Gurusaidutt	21	21
(Chinese Taipei) Wang Tzu-wei	9	13

==== Third qualifier ====
First round
(Malaysia) Zulfadli Zulkiffli	19	23
(Thailand) Suppanyu Avihingsanon	21	21	16
(Denmark) Rasmus Fladberg	21	18	12
4	(India) B. Sai Praneeth	18	21	21

Qualifying competition
(Malaysia) Zulfadli Zulkiffli	6^{r}
4	(India) B. Sai Praneeth	11

==== Fourth qualifier ====
First round
(Russia) Vladimir Ivanov	12	6
(Malaysia) Mohamad Arif Abdul Latif	21	21
(Singapore) Derek Wong	13	21	21
(Indonesia) Fikri Ihsandi Hadmadi	21	17	19

Qualifying competition
(Malaysia) Mohamad Arif Abdul Latif	21	21
(Singapore) Derek Wong	12	16

== Women's singles ==
=== Seeds ===
1. (Indonesia) Maria Febe Kusumastuti (moved to first round)
2. (Vietnam) Vũ Thị Trang (moved to first round)
3. (Indonesia) Bellaetrix Manuputty (moved to first round)
4. (Hong Kong) Cheung Ngan Yi

=== Qualifying draw ===
==== First qualifier ====
First round
(Malaysia) Payee Lim Peiy Yee	14	10
(Japan) Yui Hashimoto	21	21
(Singapore) Liang Xiaoyu	19	10
(Indonesia) Yulia Yosephin Susanto	21	21

Qualifying competition
(Japan) Yui Hashimoto	21	21
(Indonesia) Yulia Yosephin Susanto	14	13

==== Second qualifier ====
First round
4	(Hong Kong) Cheung Ngan Yi	20	21	12
(Indonesia) Hanna Ramadini	22	11	21
(Malaysia) Sannatasah Saniru	12	16
(Indonesia) Ruselli Hartawan	21	21

Qualifying competition
(Indonesia) Hanna Ramadini	17	21	14
(Indonesia) Ruselli Hartawan	21	18	21

==== Third qualifier ====
First round
(Malaysia) Tee Jing Yi	21	21
(South Korea) Kim Hyo-min	9	13
(Austria) Simone Prutsch	8	20
(Indonesia) Jauza Fadhila Sugiarto	21	22

Qualifying competition
(Malaysia) Tee Jing Yi	22	21
(Indonesia) Jauza Fadhila Sugiarto	20	12

==== Fourth qualifier ====
First round
(Chinese Taipei) Hung Shih-han	21	17	12
(Indonesia) Lyanny Alessandra Mainaky	14	21	21
(Indonesia) Rusydina Antardayu Riodingin	21	21
(Singapore) Ninna Tan	15	5

Qualifying competition
(Indonesia) Lyanny Alessandra Mainaky	17	14
(Indonesia) Rusydina Antardayu Riodingin	21	21

== Men's doubles ==
=== Seeds ===
1. (Scotland) Robert Blair / (Japan) Shintaro Ikeda
2. (Philippines) Peter Gabriel Magnaye / (Philippines) Paul Jefferson Vivas
3. (Singapore) Terry Hee / (Singapore) Hendra Wijaya
4. (Thailand) Bodin Isara / (Thailand) Maneepong Jongjit (withdrew)

=== Qualifying draw ===
==== First qualifier ====
First round
1	(Scotland) Robert Blair (Japan) Shintaro Ikeda	18	21	15
(Malaysia) Mohd Razif Abdul Latif (Malaysia) Muhammad Hafiz Hashim	21	19	21
(Indonesia) Markis Kido (Indonesia) Agripinna Putra	21	21
(Malaysia) Mohd Zakry Abdul Latif (Malaysia) Muhammad Hafizi Hashim	19	13

Qualifying competition
(Malaysia) Mohd Razif Abdul Latif (Malaysia) Muhammad Hafiz Hashim	15	21	17
(Indonesia) Markis Kido (Indonesia) Agripinna Putra	21	17	21

==== Second qualifier ====
First round
(Singapore) Lee Jian Liang (Singapore) Bimo Adi Prakoso	12	10
(Malaysia) Chooi Kah Ming (Malaysia) Ow Yao Han	21	21
(Singapore) Loh Kean Hean (Singapore) Jason Wong	15	18
(Malaysia) Lee Jian Yi (Malaysia) Lim Zhen Ting	21	21

Qualifying competition
(Malaysia) Chooi Kah Ming (Malaysia) Ow Yao Han	21	21
(Malaysia) Lee Jian Yi (Malaysia) Lim Zhen Ting	13	14

==== Third qualifier ====
First round
(Philippines) Philip Joper Escueta (Philippines) Ronel Estanislao	20	21	21
(Singapore) Loh Kean Yew (Singapore) Ryan Ng	22	11	13
(Thailand) Watchara Buranakruea (Thailand) Pakkawat Vilailak	w/o
3	(Singapore) Terry Hee (Singapore) Hendra Wijaya

Qualifying competition
(Philippines) Philip Joper Escueta (Philippines) Ronel Estanislao	17	12
(Singapore) Terry Hee (Singapore) Hendra Wijaya	21	21

==== Fourth qualifier ====
First round
(Indonesia) Yonathan Suryatama Dasuki (Indonesia) Didit Juang	22	21
(Malaysia) Zulfaiz Bin Zulkiffli (Malaysia) Zulhelmi Zulkiffli	20	7
(Indonesia) Christopher Rusdianto (Indonesia) Trikusuma Wardhana	22	14	11
2	(Philippines) Peter Gabriel Magnaye (Philippines) Paul Jefferson Vivas	20	21	21

Qualifying competition
(Indonesia) Yonathan Suryatama Dasuki (Indonesia) Didit Juang	19	21	21
(Philippines) Peter Gabriel Magnaye (Philippines) Paul Jefferson Vivas	21	19	11

== Women's doubles ==
=== Seeds ===
1. (Indonesia) Apriani / (Indonesia) Jauza Fadhila Sugiarto
2. (Indonesia) Suci Rizky Andini / (Indonesia) Maretha Dea Giovani
3. (Singapore) Grace Chua / (Singapore) Ninna Tan
4. (Singapore) Ong Ren Ne / (Singapore) Deline Quek

=== Qualifying draw ===
==== First qualifier ====
Qualifying competition
1	(Indonesia) Apriani (Indonesia) Jauza Fadhila Sugiarto
	(Singapore) Elaine Chua (Singapore) Tan Wei Han	w/o

==== Second qualifier ====
Qualifying competition
3	(Singapore) Grace Chua (Singapore) Ninna Tan	12	23
	(Thailand) Chaladchalam Chayanit (Thailand) Phataimas Muenwong	21	25

==== Third qualifier ====
Qualifying competition
	(Malaysia) Payee Lim Peiy Yee (Malaysia) Lim Peiy Zhean	19	22	23
4	(Singapore) Ong Ren Ne (Singapore) Deline Quek	21	20	25

==== Fourth qualifier ====
Qualifying competition
	(Singapore) Grace Chua (Singapore) Ninna Tan	13	9
2	(Indonesia) Suci Rizky Andini (Indonesia) Maretha Dea Giovani	21	21

== Mixed doubles ==
=== Seeds ===
1. (Chinese Taipei) Liao Min-chun / (Chinese Taipei) Chen Hsiao-huan (moved to first round)
2. (India) Tarun Kona / (India) N. Sikki Reddy
3. (Indonesia) Trikusuma Wardhana / (Indonesia) Nadya Melati
4. (Malaysia) Mohd Lutfi Zaim Abdul Khalid / (Malaysia) Soong Fie Cho

=== Qualifying draw ===
==== First qualifier ====
First round
Bye
(Singapore) Jason Wong (Singapore) Citra Putri Sari Dewi
(Indonesia) Agripinna Putra (Indonesia) Rizki Amelia Pradipta	11	12
(China) Wang Yilyu (China) Xia Huan	21	21

Qualifying competition
1	(Singapore) Jason Wong (Singapore) Citra Putri Sari Dewi	18	9
(China) Wang Yilyu (China) Xia Huan	21	21

==== Second qualifier ====
First round
4	(Malaysia) Mohd Lutfi Zaim Abdul Khalid (Malaysia) Soong Fie Cho	21	21
(Indonesia) Panji Akbar Sudrajat (Indonesia) Apriani	12	15
(Indonesia) Didit Juang (Indonesia) Keshya Nurvita Hanadia	15	13
(Thailand) Trawut Potieng (Thailand) Jongkonphan Kittiharakul	21	21

Qualifying competition
4	(Malaysia) Mohd Lutfi Zaim Abdul Khalid (Malaysia) Soong Fie Cho	16	18
(Thailand) Trawut Potieng (Thailand) Jongkonphan Kittiharakul	21	21

==== Third qualifier ====
First round
(Singapore) Loh Kean Hean (Singapore) Elaine Chua	w/o
(Malaysia) Lee Jian Yi (Malaysia) Lim Peiy Zhean
(Malaysia) Lim Zhen Ting (Malaysia) Payee Lim Peiy Yee	21	21
3	(Indonesia) Trikusuma Wardhana (Indonesia) Nadya Melati	19	13

Qualifying competition
(Malaysia) Lee Jian Yi (Malaysia) Lim Peiy Zhean	10	21	21
(Malaysia) Lim Zhen Ting (Malaysia) Payee Lim Peiy Yee	21	15	13

==== Fourth qualifier ====
First round
(Malaysia) Mohd Razif Abdul Latif (Malaysia) Sannatasah Saniru	21	21
(Indonesia) Christopher Rusdianto (Indonesia) Dian Fitriani	13	14
(Singapore) Lee Jian Liang (Singapore) Crystal Wong	11	12
2	(India) Tarun Kona (India) N. Siki Reddy	21	21

Qualifying competition
(Malaysia) Mohd Razif Abdul Latif (Malaysia) Sannatasah Saniru	11	17
2	(India) Tarun Kona (India) N. Siki Reddy	21	21
