= 2015 Malaysia Super Series Premier Qualification =

Qualification for 2015 Malaysia Super Series Premier was held on 31 March 2015.

== Men's Single ==
=== Seeds ===
1. (Republic of Ireland) Scott Evans (moved to first round)
2. (Indonesia) Dionysius Hayom Rumbaka
3. (Malaysia) Chong Wei Feng
4. (Hong Kong) Angus Ng Ka Long

=== Qualifying draw ===
==== First qualifier ====
First Round
(Malaysia) Goh Soon Huat	16	14
(Indonesia) Fikri Ihsandi Hadmadi	21	21
(United States) Sattawat Pongnairat	12	8
(Malaysia) Zulfadli Zulkiffli	21	21

Qualifying Competition
(Indonesia) Fikri Ihsandi Hadmadi	21	14
(Malaysia) Zulfadli Zulkiffli	23	21

==== Second qualifier ====
First Round
3	(Malaysia) Chong Wei Feng	21	9
(Denmark) Emil Holst	23	21
(China) Xue Song	21	19	22
(Denmark) Rasmus Fladberg	14	21	20

Qualifying Competition
(Denmark) Emil Holst	19	18
(China) Xue Song	21	21

==== Third qualifier ====
First Round
(Chinese Taipei) Wang Tzu-Wei	10	21	17
(Thailand) Boonsak Ponsana	21	14	21
(Denmark) Joachim Persson	16	17
4	(Hong Kong) Angus Ng Ka Long	21	21

Qualifying Competition
(Thailand) Boonsak Ponsana	22	10	23
4	(Hong Kong) Angus Ng Ka Long	20	21	21

==== Fourth qualifier ====
First Round
(Malaysia) Chiang Jiann Shiarng	17	11
(Malaysia) Mohamad Arif Abdul Latif	21	21
(Malaysia) Daren Liew	19	21	16
2	(Indonesia) Dionysius Hayom Rumbaka	21	18	21

Qualifying Competition
(Malaysia) Mohamad Arif Abdul Latif	8	15
2	(Indonesia) Dionysius Hayom Rumbaka	21	21

== Women's Single ==
=== Seeds ===
1. (Indonesia) Bellaetrix Manuputty (moved to first round)
2. (Malaysia) Yang Li Lian
3. (Malaysia) Tee Jing Yi
4. (Japan) Yui Hashimoto

=== Qualifying draw ===
==== First qualifier ====
First Round
(Malaysia) Lim Peiy Zhean	5	9
(Malaysia) Lim Yin Fun	21	21
(Indonesia) Rusydina Antardayu Riodingin	10	10
(South Korea) Kim Hyo-min	21	21

Qualifying Competition
(Malaysia) Lim Yin Fun	7	13
(South Korea) Kim Hyo-min	21	21

==== Second qualifier ====
First Round
3	(Malaysia) Tee Jing Yi	21	21
(Indonesia) Yulia Yosephin Susanto	15	19
(Chinese Taipei) Hung Shih-Han	21	21	21
(Austria) Simone Prutsch	8	23	14

Qualifying Competition
3	(Malaysia) Tee Jing Yi	21	14	17
(Chinese Taipei) Hung Shih-Han	17	21	21

==== Third qualifier ====
First Round
(Malaysia) Lim Chiew Sien	21	11	12
(Hong Kong) Cheung Ngan Yi	18	21	21
(Malaysia) Payee Lim Peiy Yee	4	13
4	(Japan) Yui Hashimoto	21	21

Qualifying Competition
(Hong Kong) Cheung Ngan Yi	19	21	21
4	(Japan) Yui Hashimoto	21	16	13

==== Fourth qualifier ====
First Round
(Indonesia) Jauza Fadhila Sugiarto	14	19
(Malaysia) Lyddia Cheah Yi Yu	21	21
(China) Yao Xue	21	21
2	(Malaysia) Yang Li Lian	8	17

Qualifying Competition
(Malaysia) Lyddia Cheah Yi Yu	17	21	10
(China) Yao Xue	21	7	21

== Men's doubles ==
=== Seeds ===
1. (Germany) Raphael Beck / (Germany) Andreas Heinz
2. (Thailand) Trawut Potieng / (Thailand) Nipitphon Puangpuapech
3. (Indonesia) Yohanes Rendy Sugiarto / (Indonesia) Afiat Yuris Wirawan
4. (Chinese Taipei) Chen Hung-Ling / (Chinese Taipei) Wang Chi-Lin

=== Qualifying draw ===
==== First qualifier ====
First Round
1	(Germany) Raphael Beck (Germany) Andreas Heinz	17	21	21
(Malaysia) Chua Khek Wei (Malaysia) Nelson Heg Wei Kiat	21	17	11
(Indonesia) Markis Kido (Indonesia) Agripinna Putra	21	21
(Thailand) Watchara Buranakuea (Thailand) Pakkawat Vilailak	18	8

Qualifying Competition
1	(Germany) Raphael Beck (Germany) Andreas Heinz	8	16
(Indonesia) Markis Kido (Indonesia) Agripinna Putra	21	21

==== Second qualifier ====
First Round
4	(Chinese Taipei) Chen Hung-Ling (Chinese Taipei) Wang Chi-Lin	21	21
(Malaysia) Zulfaiz Bin Zulkiffli (Malaysia) Zulhelmi Zulkiffli	11	9
(Philippines) Philip Joper Escueta (Philippines) Ronel Estanislao	21	21
(Malaysia) Jagdish Singh (Malaysia) Roni Tan Wee Long	6	18

Qualifying Competition
4	(Chinese Taipei) Chen Hung-Ling (Chinese Taipei) Wang Chi-Lin	21	21
(Philippines) Philip Joper Escueta (Philippines) Ronel Estanislao	10	15

==== Third qualifier ====
First Round
(Malaysia) Ng Di Hua (Malaysia) Woon Man Chun	18	21	21
(Malaysia) Lee Yan Sheng (Malaysia) Lim Woon Fui	21	19	18
(Chinese Taipei) Liao Min-Chun (Chinese Taipei) Tseng Min-Hao	21	21
3	(Indonesia) Yohanes Rendy Sugiarto (Indonesia) Afiat Yuris Wirawan	16	17

Qualifying Competition
(Malaysia) Ng Di Hua (Malaysia) Woon Man Chun	15	21	19
(Chinese Taipei) Liao Min-Chun (Chinese Taipei) Tseng Min-Hao	21	19	21

==== Fourth qualifier ====
First Round
(Malaysia) Lee Jian Yi (Malaysia) Lim Zhen Ting	21	17	14
(Philippines) Peter Gabriel Magnaye (Philippines) Paul Jefferson Vivas	18	21	21
(Hong Kong) Alan Chan Yun Lung (Hong Kong) Reginald Lee Chun Hei	21	18	21
2	(Thailand) Trawut Potieng (Thailand) Nipitphon Puangpuapech	17	21	23

Qualifying Competition
(Philippines) Peter Gabriel Magnaye (Philippines) Paul Jefferson Vivas	15	21	15
2	(Thailand) Trawut Potieng (Thailand) Nipitphon Puangpuapech	21	16	21

== Women's doubles ==
=== Seeds ===
1. (Thailand) Jongkonphan Kittiharakul / (Thailand) Rawinda Prajongjai
2. (India) Dhanya Nair / (India) Mohita Sahdev
3. (Chinese Taipei) Hsu Ya-Ching / (Chinese Taipei) Pai Yu-Po
4. (Chinese Taipei) Chiang Kai-Hsin / (Chinese Taipei) Wu Fang-Chien

=== Qualifying draw ===
==== First qualifier ====
First Round
1	(Thailand) Jongkonphan Kittiharakul (Thailand) Rawinda Prajongjai
bye
(Germany) Isabel Herttrich (Germany) Birgit Michels	21	21
(Malaysia) Chin Kah Mun (Malaysia) Chow Mei Kuan	14	18

Qualifying Competition
1	(Thailand) Jongkonphan Kittiharakul (Thailand) Rawinda Prajongjai	20	21	18
(Germany) Isabel Herttrich (Germany) Birgit Michels	22	14	21

==== Second qualifier ====
First Round
3	(Chinese Taipei) Hsu Ya-Ching (Chinese Taipei) Pai Yu-Po
bye
(Indonesia) Apriani (Indonesia) Jauza Fadhila Sugiarto	21	21
(Malaysia) Erica Khoo Pei San (Malaysia) Vern See To Chia	14	18

Qualifying Competition
3	(Chinese Taipei) Hsu Ya-Ching (Chinese Taipei) Pai Yu-Po	21	21
(Indonesia) Apriani (Indonesia) Jauza Fadhila Sugiarto	18	17

==== Third qualifier ====
First Round
(Thailand) Chaladchalam Chayanit (Thailand) Phataimas Muenwong	16	19
(Indonesia) Anggia Shitta Awanda (Indonesia) Ni Ketut Mahadewi Istirani	21	21
(Malaysia) Payee Lim Peiy Yee (Malaysia) Lim Peiy Zhean	4	10
4	(Chinese Taipei) Chiang Kai-Hsin (Chinese Taipei) Wu Fang-Chien	21	21

Qualifying Competition
(Indonesia) Anggia Shitta Awanda (Indonesia) Ni Ketut Mahadewi Istirani	21	21
4	(Chinese Taipei) Chiang Kai-Hsin (Chinese Taipei) Wu Fang-Chien	13	15

==== Fourth qualifier ====
First Round
(Chinese Taipei) Chen Hsiao Huan (Chinese Taipei) Lai Chia Wen	11	21	16
(Indonesia) Gebby Ristiyani Imawan (Indonesia) Tiara Rosalia Nuraidah	21	18	21
bye
2	(India) Dhanya Nair (India) Mohita Sahdev

Qualifying Competition
(Indonesia) Gebby Ristiyani Imawan (Indonesia) Tiara Rosalia Nuraidah	21	21
2	(India) Dhanya Nair (India) Mohita Sahdev	14	13

== Mixed doubles ==
=== Seeds ===
1. (Singapore) Chayut Triyachart / (Singapore) Shinta Mulia Sari
2. (Japan) Keigo Sonoda / (Japan) Naoko Fukuman
3. (Malaysia) Wong Fai Yin / (Malaysia) Chow Mei Kuan
4. (Malaysia) Tan Aik Quan / (Malaysia) Lai Pei Jing

=== Qualifying draw ===
==== First qualifier ====
First Round
1	(Singapore) Chayut Triyachart (Singapore) Shinta Mulia Sari
bye
(Indonesia) Andrei Adistia (Indonesia) Vita Marissa	21	21
(Malaysia) Mohd Lutfi Zaim Abdul Khalid (Malaysia) Soong Fie Cho	17	15

Qualifying Competition
1	(Singapore) Chayut Triyachart (Singapore) Shinta Mulia Sari	w/o
(Indonesia) Andrei Adistia (Indonesia) Vita Marissa

==== Second qualifier ====
First Round
4	(Malaysia) Tan Aik Quan (Malaysia) Lai Pei Jing	17	21	21
(Sweden) Jonathan Nordh (Sweden) Emelie Fabbeke	21	14	19
(Malaysia) Lee Jian Yi (Malaysia) Lim Peiy Zhean	17	11
(Chinese Taipei) Tseng Min-Hao (Chinese Taipei) Lai Chia-Wen	21	21

Qualifying Competition
4	(Malaysia) Tan Aik Quan (Malaysia) Lai Pei Jing	18	19
(Chinese Taipei) Tseng Min-Hao (Chinese Taipei) Lai Chia-Wen	21	21

==== Third qualifier ====
First Round
(Indonesia) Agripinna Putra (Indonesia) Rizki Amelia Pradipta	22	15	9
(Thailand) Trawut Potieng (Thailand) Jongkonphan Kittiharakul	20	21	21
(Indonesia) Panji Akbar Sudrajat (Indonesia) Apriani	11	15
3	(Malaysia) Wong Fai Yin (Malaysia) Chow Mei Kuan	21	21

Qualifying Competition
(Thailand) Trawut Potieng (Thailand) Jongkonphan Kittiharakul	7	11
3	(Malaysia) Wong Fai Yin (Malaysia) Chow Mei Kuan	21	21

==== Fourth qualifier ====
First Round
(Malaysia) Lim Zhen Ting (Malaysia) Payee Lim Peiy Yee	14	16
(Chinese Taipei) Liao Min-Chun (Chinese Taipei) Chen Hsiao-Huan	21	21
bye
2	(Japan) Keigo Sonoda (Japan) Naoko Fukuman

Qualifying Competition
(Chinese Taipei) Liao Min-Chun (Chinese Taipei) Chen Hsiao-Huan	21	15	17
2	(Japan) Keigo Sonoda (Japan) Naoko Fukuman	19	21	21
