= 2014 Canada Open Grand Prix =

Tournament details
- Dates: June 30, 2014 - July 5, 2014
- Total prize money: US$50,000
- Venue: UBC Thunderbird Arena

The 2014 Canada Open Grand Prix was the seventh grand prix gold and grand prix tournament of the 2014 BWF Grand Prix Gold and Grand Prix. The tournament was held in UBC Thunderbird Arena, Vancouver, British Columbia, Canada June 30 until July 5, 2014 and had a total purse of $50,000.

== Players by nation ==
Nation	First round	Second round	Third round	Quarterfinals	Semifinals	Final
Canada	31	14		4		
Chinese Taipei	8	7	1	5	4	2
United States	8	4	2	2	1	
South Korea	6	6	2	4	2	1
Australia	3	1				
Jamaica	3					
Ireland	2	2			1	
Czech Republic	2	1				
France	2	1		1		
India	2		1			
Denmark	1	1	1			
Switzerland	1	1				
Netherlands	1			1		1
Scotland	1					
Mexico	1					
Cuba	1					
Austria	1					
Hong Kong		1			1	1
Belgium		1				
Lithuania		1				
New Zealand		1				
Trinidad and Tobago		1				
Russia		1				
Spain		1				
Israel			1			
Germany				2	1	

== Men's singles ==
=== Seeds ===
1. Chinese Taipei Chou Tien-chen (quarter-final)
2. Netherlands Eric Pang (first round)
3. Hong Kong Wong Wing Ki (semi-final)
4. India Anand Pawar (third round)
5. Chinese Taipei Wang Tzu-wei (first round)
6. Spain Pablo Abian (withdrew)
7. Thailand Suppanyu Avihingsanon (withdrew)
8. Israel Misha Zilberman (third round)
9. Cuba Osleni Guerrero (first round)
10. Denmark Joachim Persson (second round)
11. India Arvind Bhat (first round)
12. United States Sattawat Pongnairat (third round)
13. Denmark Rasmus Fladberg (third round)
14. United States Howard Shu (third round)
15. Hong Kong Ng Ka Long (final)
16. Ireland Scott Evans (second round)

=== Finals ===
Quarterfinals
1	Chinese Taipei Chou Tien-chen	18	16
South Korea Lee Hyun-il	21	21
3	Hong Kong Wong Wing Ki	21	21
Thailand Pannawit Thongnuam	18	7
Q7	Canada Martin Guiffre	14	10
Chinese Taipei Shih Kuei-chun	21	21
South Korea Ha Young-woong	17	10
15	Hong Kong Ng Ka Long	21	21

Semifinals
South Korea Lee Hyun-il	21	21
3	Hong Kong Wong Wing Ki	17	17
Chinese Taipei Shih Kuei-chun	21	17	12
15	Hong Kong Ng Ka Long	19	21	21

Final
South Korea Lee Hyun-il	21	21
15	Hong Kong Ng Ka Long	16	14

=== Top half ===
==== Section 1 ====
First Round
1	Chinese Taipei Chou T-c	21	21
Q5	South Korea Kim Y-c	14	16
Canada N Yakura	13	14
Hong Kong Tam CH	21	21
13	Denmark R Fladberg
Scotland A Casey	wo
United States R Chew	21	20	17
Canada J Kryczka	13	22	21

Second Round
1	Chinese Taipei Chou T-c	21	21
Hong Kong Tam CH	12	17
13	Denmark R Fladberg	21	21
Canada J Kryczka	5	9

Third Round
1	Chinese Taipei Chou T-c	21	14	21
13	Denmark R Fladberg	16	21	15

==== Section 2 ====
First Round
PMD	South Korea Jung Y-j	12	21	21
Czech Republic J Frohlich	21	15	18
South Korea Lee H-i	21	21
Chinese Taipei Wan C-h	10	19
11	India A Bhat	1^{r}
Belgium M Moreels	2
Chinese Taipei Lu C-h	21	21
PFQ	Canada J Hurlburt-Yu	12	6

Second Round
PMD	South Korea Jung Y-j	11	12
South Korea Lee H-i	21	21
Belgium M Moreels	18	14
PFQ	Chinese Taipei Lu C-h	21	21

Third Round
South Korea Lee H-i	21	21
PFQ	Chinese Taipei Lu C-h	15	12

==== Section 3 ====
First Round
3	Hong Kong Wong WK	21	21
Chinese Taipei Lin Y-h	17	12
PFQ	Switzerland M Fux	21	21
Indonesia N Sulistyo	18	19
12	United States S Pongnairat	21	21
Canada T Chiu	9	9
France M Lo Ying Ping	21	21
Ireland J Magee	14	11

Second Round
3	Hong Kong Wong WK	21	21
PFQ	Switzerland M Fux	6	6
12	United States S Pongnairat	21	21
France M Lo Ying Ping	16	13

Third Round
3	Hong Kong Wong WK	21	21
12	United States S Pongnairat	18	8

==== Section 4 ====
First Round
8	Israel M Zilberman
Mexico L Munoz	wo
Jamaica G Henry	12	17
Austria L Wraber	21	21
9	Cuba O Guerrero	21	16	15
Thailand P Thongnuam	19	21	21
United States B Seguin	17	21	7
Lithuania K Navickas	21	15	21

Second Round
8	Israel M Zilberman	21	22
Austria L Wraber	18	20
Thailand P Thongnuam	21	21
Lithuania K Navickas	15	11

Third Round
8	Israel M Zilberman	19	11
Thailand P Thongnuam	21	21

=== Bottom half ===
==== Section 5 ====
First Round
Canada A Zhuang	22	21	18
Chinese Taipei Yu C-h	24	18	21
Canada Lam H	10	13
14	United States H Shu	21	21
Jamaica S Ricketts	19	16
PFQ	Canada C Che	21	21
Q7	Canada M Guiffre	21	21
5	Chinese Taipei Wang T-w	16	14

Second Round
Chinese Taipei Yu C-h	7	19
14	United States H Shu	21	21
PFQ	Canada C Che	14	21	15
Q7	Canada M Guiffre	21	13	21

Third Round
14	United States H Shu	16	18
Q7	Canada M Guiffre	21	21

==== Section 6 ====
First Round
Chinese Taipei Shih K-c	17	21	21
Austria M Almer	21	16	14
Australia L Wang	8	15
10	Denmark J Persson	21	21
Q2	Canada B Milroy	21	20	21
Canada L Couture	19	22	14
South Korea Kim D-h	17	9
4	India A Pawar	21	21

Second Round
Chinese Taipei Shih K-c	21	18	21
10	Denmark J Persson	14	21	8
Q2	Canada B Milroy	12	11
4	India A Pawar	21	21

Third Round
Chinese Taipei Shih K-c	24	17	21
4	India A Pawar	22	21	15

==== Section 7 ====
First Round
South Korea Ha Y-w	21	21
PFQ	Canada A Lin	9	10
PMD	Canada D Yao	8	7
16	Ireland S Evans	21	21
New Zealand J Wu	22	21
United States A Amphie	20	14
Q1	South Korea Yang J-w
PFQ	Australia Oon HK	wo

Second Round
South Korea Ha Y-w	22	21
16	Ireland S Evans	20	18
New Zealand J Wu	17	16
Q1	South Korea Yang J-w	21	21

Third Round
South Korea Ha Y-w	21	21
Q1	South Korea Yang J-w	5	13

==== Section 8 ====
First Round
United States Lee HL	21	21
Q6	Canada B Holcek	7	12
Q3	Canada M Lim	5	5
15	Hong Kong Ng KL	21	21
Trinidad and Tobago N Bonkowsky	21	21	21
Q8	Canada J Lin	19	23	7
Q4	South Korea Son J-h	23	10	22
2	Netherlands E Pang	21	21	20

Second Round
United States Lee HL	17	4
15	Hong Kong Ng KL	21	21
Trinidad and Tobago N Bonkowsky	11	8
Q4	South Korea Son J-h	21	21

Third Round
15	Hong Kong Ng KL	21	21
Q4	South Korea Son J-h	14	7

== Women's singles ==
=== Seeds ===
1. Canada Michelle Li (champion)
2. United States Zhang Beiwen (semi-final)
3. Spain Beatriz Corrales (second round)
4. Bulgaria Linda Zechiri (withdrew)
5. Ireland Chloe Magee (first round)
6. Germany Karin Schnaase (quarter-final)
7. Russia Natalia Perminova (second round)
8. Switzerland Sabrina Jaquet (first round)

=== Finals ===
Semifinals
1	Canada Michelle Li	20	21	21
South Korea Ko Eun-byul	22	19	16
Chinese Taipei Pai Yu-po	13	21	21
2	United States Zhang Beiwen	21	17	12

Final
1	Canada Michelle Li	21	23
Chinese Taipei Pai Yu-po	16	21

=== Top half ===
==== Section 1 ====
First Round
1	Canada M Li	21	17	21
United States J Subandhi	11	21	15
Canada Q Ouyang	20	16
Q1	Canada B Tam	21	21
5	Ireland C Magee	21	16	13
Hong Kong Cheung NY	19	21	21
United States I Wang	21	20	14
Chinese Taipei Cheng C-y	16	22	21

Second Round
1	Canada M Li	21	21
Q1	Canada B Tam	17	19
Hong Kong Cheung NY	19	19
Chinese Taipei Cheng C-y	21	21

Quarterfinals
1	Canada M Li	21	18	21
Chinese Taipei Cheng C-y	13	21	16

==== Section 2 ====
First Round
3	Spain B Corrales	21	22
Chinese Taipei Hung S-h	16	20
South Korea Ko E-b	21	21
Chinese Taipei Chen S-y	11	8
6	Germany K Schnaase	21	21
Q3	South Korea Park S-y	16	13
Chinese Taipei Lin Y-c	21	22	21
France P Le Buhanic	16	24	15

Second Round
3	Spain B Corrales	17	13
South Korea Ko E-b	21	21
6	Germany K Schnaase	21	21
Chinese Taipei Lin Y-c	13	12

Quarterfinals
South Korea Ko E-b	22	21
6	Germany K Schnaase	20	13

=== Bottom half ===
==== Section 3 ====
First Round
Canada R Honderich	19	16
Chinese Taipei Pai Y-p	21	21
Chinese Taipei Chiang M-h	21	15	21
8	Switzerland S Jaquet	13	21	15
United States Rong B	16	19
Chinese Taipei Hsu Y-c	21	21
United States C Look	5	3
PFQ	South Korea Song M-j	21	21

Second Round
Chinese Taipei Pai Y-p	21	21
Chinese Taipei Chiang M-h	17	12
Chinese Taipei Hsu Y-c	21	12	21
PFQ	South Korea Song M-j	19	21	18

Quarterfinals
Chinese Taipei Pai Y-p	22	21
Chinese Taipei Hsu Y-c	20	15

==== Section 4 ====
First Round
Q4	South Korea Kim M-h	21	21
Canada J Ko	13	10
Canada K O'Donoghue	14	11
7	Russia N Perminova	21	21
Chinese Taipei Lee C-h	21	21
Czech Republic Z Pavelkova	11	13
Q2	Canada W Zhang	7	9
2	United States Zhang BW	21	21

Second Round
Q4	South Korea Kim M-h	21	21
7	Russia N Perminova	12	13
Chinese Taipei Lee C-h	18	14
2	United States Zhang BW	21	21

Quarterfinals
Q4	South Korea Kim M-h	13	21	19
2	United States Zhang BW	21	15	21

== Men's doubles ==
=== Seeds ===
1. Australia Robin Middleton / Ross Smith (withdrew)
2. United States Phillip Chew / Sattawat Pongnairat (quarter-final)
3. Canada Adrian Liu / Derrick Ng (quarter-final)
4. France Laurent Constantin / Matthieu Lo Ying Ping (quarter-final)
5. Chinese Taipei Liang Jui-wei / Lu Chia-bin (champion)
6. Chinese Taipei Liao Min-chun / Tseng Min-hao (final)
7. Germany Max Schwenger / Josche Zurwonne (semi-final)
8. Canada Phillipe Charron / Toby Ng (first round)

=== Finals ===
Semifinals
Chinese Taipei Chou Tien-chen; Chinese Taipei Liao Chao-hsiang	13	12
5	Chinese Taipei Liang Jui-wei; Chinese Taipei Lu Chia-bin	21	21
7	Germany Max Schwenger; Germany Josche Zurwonne	19	13
6	Chinese Taipei Liao Min-chun; Chinese Taipei Tseng Min-hao	21	21

Final
5	Chinese Taipei Liang Jui-wei; Chinese Taipei Lu Chia-bin	21	16	21
6	Chinese Taipei Liao Min-chun; Chinese Taipei Tseng Min-hao	18	21	16

=== Top half ===
==== Section 1 ====
First Round
PFQ	Canada A Ng; Canada B Ng	12	4
United States R Chew; United States R Gunawan	21	21
Canada A Lau; Canada D Yao	21	6	21
Chinese Taipei Wan C-h; Chinese Taipei Wang T-w	18	21	19
8	Canada P Charron; Canada T Ng	10	17
Chinese Taipei Chou T-c; Chinese Taipei Liao C-h	21	21
Czech Republic J Frohlich; Switzerland M Fux	21	15	21
Q2	Canada A Lee; Canada A Lim	12	21	13

Second Round
United States R Chew; United States R Gunawan	10	17
Canada A Lau; Canada D Yao	21	21
Chinese Taipei Chou T-c; Chinese Taipei Liao C-h	19	21	21
Czech Republic J Frohlich; Switzerland M Fux	21	9	11

Quarterfinals
Canada A Lau; Canada D Yao	11	15
Chinese Taipei Chou T-c; Chinese Taipei Liao C-h	21	21

==== Section 2 ====
First Round
4	France L Constantin; France M Lo Ying Ping	21	21
United States M Fogarty; United States B Seguin	17	9
Ireland J Magee; Ireland S Magee	21	21
United States A Amphie; United States A Shekhtman	19	17
5	Chinese Taipei Liang J-w; Chinese Taipei Lu C-b	21	21
Canada J Kryczka; Canada G Robb	10	5
South Korea Lee J-s; South Korea Ryu S-h	21	21
India G Prasad; India V Prasad	17	16

Second Round
4	France L Constantin; France M Lo Ying Ping	23	23
Ireland J Magee; Ireland S Magee	21	21
5	Chinese Taipei Liang J-w; Chinese Taipei Lu C-b	21	21
South Korea Lee J-s; South Korea Ryu S-h	10	13

Quarterfinals
4	France L Constantin; France M Lo Ying Ping	14	18
5	Chinese Taipei Liang J-w; Chinese Taipei Lu C-b	21	21

=== Bottom half ===
==== Section 3 ====
First Round
Denmark R Fladberg; Denmark J Persson	2^{r}
Canada K Li; Canada N Yakura	4
Canada B Leung; Canada M Lim	5	14
7	Germany M Schwenger; Germany J Zurwonne	21	21
Q1	Canada J Hon; Canada D Leung	10	12
Canada J Hurlburt-Yu; Canada B Lin	21	21
PFQ	Canada C Che; Canada J Ho	9	15
3	Canada A Liu; Canada D Ng	21	21

Second Round
Canada K Li; Canada N Yakura	12	18
7	Germany M Schwenger; Germany J Zurwonne	21	21
Canada J Hurlburt-Yu; Canada B Lin	14	15
3	Canada A Liu; Canada D Ng	21	21

Quarterfinals
7	Germany M Schwenger; Germany J Zurwonne	21	21
3	Canada A Liu; Canada D Ng	15	18

==== Section 4 ====
First Round
South Korea Bae K-y; South Korea Kil H-c	21	18	13
Chinese Taipei Chen C-j; Chinese Taipei Wang C-l	15	21	21
Q4	South Korea Kim D-h; South Korea Son J-h	22	21
6	Chinese Taipei Liao M-c; Chinese Taipei Tseng M-h	24	23
Q3	South Korea Jeon C-s; South Korea Yang J-w	20	15
South Korea Jung Y-j; South Korea Kim Y-c	21	21
Jamaica G Henry; Jamaica S Ricketts	15	15
2	United States P Chew; United States S Pongnairat	21	21

Second Round
Chinese Taipei Chen C-j; Chinese Taipei Wang C-l	11	19
6	Chinese Taipei Liao M-c; Chinese Taipei Tseng M-h	21	21
South Korea Jung Y-j; South Korea Kim Y-c	9	18
2	United States P Chew; United States S Pongnairat	21	21

Quarterfinals
6	Chinese Taipei Liao M-c; Chinese Taipei Tseng M-h	21	21
2	United States P Chew; United States S Pongnairat	9	12

== Women's doubles ==
=== Seeds ===
1. United States Eva Lee / Paula Lynn Obanana (second round)
2. Australia Tang Hetian / Renuga Veeran (withdrew)
3. Netherlands Samantha Barning / Iris Tabeling (quarter-final)
4. Canada Alex Bruce / Phyllis Chan (second round)

=== Finals ===
Semifinals
Chinese Taipei Cheng Chi-ya; Chinese Taipei Lee Chia-hsin	23	7	15
South Korea Park So-young; South Korea Park Sun-young	21	21	21
Chinese Taipei Hsu Ya-ching; Chinese Taipei Pai Yu-po	17	20
South Korea Choi Hye-in; South Korea Lee So-hee	21	22

Final
South Korea Park So-young; South Korea Park Sun-young	15	18
South Korea Choi Hye-in; South Korea Lee So-hee	21	21

=== Top half ===
==== Section 1 ====
First Round
1	United States E Lee; United States P Obanana
BYE
Chinese Taipei Kuo Y-w; Chinese Taipei Wang P-r
BYE
Chinese Taipei Cheng C-y; Chinese Taipei Lee C-h
BYE
South Korea Ko E-b; South Korea Song M-j
BYE

Second Round
1	United States E Lee; United States P Obanana	19	22
Chinese Taipei Kuo Y-w; Chinese Taipei Wang P-r	21	24
Chinese Taipei Cheng C-y; Chinese Taipei Lee C-h	21	21
South Korea Ko E-b; South Korea Song M-j	17	9

Quarterfinals
Chinese Taipei Kuo Y-w; Chinese Taipei Wang P-r	15	17
Chinese Taipei Cheng C-y; Chinese Taipei Lee C-h	21	21

==== Section 2 ====
First Round
3	Netherlands S Barning; Netherlands I Tabeling
BYE
Canada K Cheng; Canada B Tam
BYE
South Korea Park So-y; South Korea Park Sun-y
BYE
Chinese Taipei Chen S-y; Chinese Taipei Lin Y-c	17	15
Canada G Gao; Canada R Honderich	21	21

Second Round
3	Netherlands S Barning; Netherlands I Tabeling	21	21
Canada K Cheng; Canada B Tam	19	4
South Korea Park So-y; South Korea Park Sun-y	21	21
Canada G Gao; Canada R Honderich	9	15

Quarterfinals
3	Netherlands S Barning; Netherlands I Tabeling	21	14	10
South Korea Park So-y; South Korea Park Sun-y	13	21	21

=== Bottom half ===
==== Section 3 ====
First Round
Chinese Taipei Chiang K-h; Chinese Taipei Wu F-c	17	19
Germany J Goliszewski; Germany C Nelte	21	21
BYE
France P Le Buhanic; France T Vignes Waran
BYE
Chinese Taipei Hsu Y-c; Chinese Taipei Pai Y-p
BYE
4	Canada A Bruce; Canada P Chan

Second Round
Germany J Goliszewski; Germany C Nelte	21	21
France P Le Buhanic; France T Vignes Waran	11	12
Chinese Taipei Hsu Y-c; Chinese Taipei Pai Y-p	14	21	21
4	Canada A Bruce; Canada P Chan	21	19	19

Quarterfinals
Germany J Goliszewski; Germany C Nelte	19	21	10
Chinese Taipei Hsu Y-c; Chinese Taipei Pai Y-p	21	18	21

==== Section 4 ====
First Round
BYE
South Korea Choi H-i; South Korea Lee S-h
BYE
Canada C Chow; Canada C Chung
BYE
Chinese Taipei Chiang M-h; Chinese Taipei Hung S-h
BYE
2	Australia Tang HT; Australia R Veeran

Second Round
South Korea Choi H-i; South Korea Lee S-h	21	21
Canada C Chow; Canada C Chung	5	9
Chinese Taipei Chiang M-h; Chinese Taipei Hung S-h
2	Australia Tang HT; Australia R Veeran	wo

Quarterfinals
South Korea Choi H-i; South Korea Lee S-h	21	21
Chinese Taipei Chiang M-h; Chinese Taipei Hung S-h	12	11

== Mixed doubles ==
=== Seeds ===
1. Netherlands Jorrit de Ruiter / Samantha Barning (final)
2. Germany Max Schwenger / Carla Nelte (champion)
3. United States Phillip Chew / Jamie Subandhi (second round)
4. Ireland Sam Magee / Chloe Magee (semi-final)

=== Finals ===
Semifinals
1	Netherlands Jorrit de Ruiter; Netherlands Samantha Barning	21	21
South Korea Bae Kwon-young; South Korea Choi Hye-in	10	17
4	Ireland Sam Magee; Ireland Chloe Magee	17	15
2	Germany Max Schwenger; Germany Carla Nelte	21	21

Final
1	Netherlands Jorrit de Ruiter; Netherlands Samantha Barning	18	21
2	Germany Max Schwenger; Germany Carla Nelte	21	23

=== Top half ===
==== Section 1 ====
First Round
1	Netherlands J de Ruiter; Netherlands S Barning
BYE
Canada V Ip; Canada Yuen HT
Australia Oon HK; Chinese Taipei Chiang M-h	wo
Canada P Charron; Canada P Chan	19	21	21
Canada A Lau; Canada K Cheng	21	13	15
Canada J Wong; Canada W Zhang	8	5
South Korea Ryu S-h; South Korea Lee S-h	21	21

Second Round
1	Netherlands J de Ruiter; Netherlands S Barning	21	21
Canada V Ip; Canada Yuen HT	7	5
Canada P Charron; Canada P Chan	13	18
South Korea Ryu S-h; South Korea Lee S-h	21	21

Quarterfinals
1	Netherlands J de Ruiter; Netherlands S Barning	21	21
South Korea Ryu S-h; South Korea Lee S-h	12	18

==== Section 2 ====
First Round
3	United States P Chew; United States J Subandhi
BYE
South Korea Bae K-y; South Korea Choi H-i	21	21
Canada Chr Chung; Canada Che Chung	12	16
United States B Seguin; Switzerland S Jaquet	17	21	16
Canada H Wiebe; Canada G Gao	21	12	21
Canada A Liu; Canada J Ko	21	10	7
Chinese Taipei Lu C-h; Chinese Taipei Lee C-h	14	21	21

Second Round
3	United States P Chew; United States J Subandhi	14	18
South Korea Bae K-y; South Korea Choi H-i	21	21
Canada H Wiebe; Canada G Gao	21	21
Chinese Taipei Lu C-h; Chinese Taipei Lee C-h	9	16

Quarterfinals
South Korea Bae K-y; South Korea Choi H-i	21	22
Canada H Wiebe; Canada G Gao	16	20

=== Bottom half ===
==== Section 3 ====
First Round
South Korea Kil H-c; South Korea Park Sun-y	21	21
Canada D Yao; Canada K O'Donoghue	14	13
South Korea Lee J-s; South Korea Park So-y	21	21
Canada J Hon; Canada M Birkland	10	2
France L Constantin; France T Vignes Waran	28	12	13
Canada T Ng; Canada A Bruce	26	21	21
BYE
4	Ireland S Magee; Ireland C Magee

Second Round
South Korea Kil H-c; South Korea Park Sun-y	21	21
South Korea Lee J-s; South Korea Park So-y	18	17
Canada T Ng; Canada A Bruce	21	15	9
4	Ireland S Magee; Ireland C Magee	19	21	21

Quarterfinals
South Korea Kil H-c; South Korea Park Sun-y	13	7
4	Ireland S Magee; Ireland C Magee	21	21

==== Section 4 ====
First Round
Canada K Li; Canada R Honderich	11	13
United States H Shu; United States E Lee	21	21
Canada N Yakura; Canada B Tam	21	21
Canada M Chow; Canada C Chow	8	11
Canada B Lin; Canada Q Ouyang	10	14
Chinese Taipei Wang C-l; Chinese Taipei Cheng C-y	21	21
BYE
2	Germany M Schwenger; Germany C Nelte

Second Round
United States H Shu; United States E Lee	13	21	21
Canada N Yakura; Canada B Tam	21	17	17
Chinese Taipei Wang C-l; Chinese Taipei Cheng C-y	21	18
2	Germany M Schwenger; Germany C Nelte	23	21

Quarterfinals
United States H Shu; United States E Lee	11	9
2	Germany M Schwenger; Germany C Nelte	21	21

Preceded by 2014 China Masters Grand Prix Gold	BWF Grand Prix Gold and Grand Prix; 2014 season	Succeeded by 2014 U.S. Open Grand Prix Gold
