= Park So-young =

South Korean badminton player (born 1994)

Personal information
- Born: 27 May 1994 (age 32)

Sport
- Country: South Korea
- Sport: Badminton
- Handedness: Right

Women's singles & doubles
- Highest ranking: 169 (WS 28 June 2012); 73 (WD 24 April 2014); 169 (XD 17 April 2014)
- BWF profile
Medal record
Women's badminton
Representing South Korea
World Junior Championships
Silver medal – second place	2011 Taipei	Mixed team
Silver medal – second place	2010 Guadalajara	Mixed team
Asian Junior Championships
Bronze medal – third place	2012 Gimcheon	Mixed team

- Park So-young
- Hangul: 박소영
- RR: Bak Soyeong
- MR: Pak Soyŏng

Park So-young (Korean: 박소영; born 27 May 1994) is a South Korean badminton player.

== Achievements ==
=== BWF Grand Prix (1 runner-up) ===
The BWF Grand Prix has two levels: Grand Prix and Grand Prix Gold. It is a series of badminton tournaments, sanctioned by Badminton World Federation (BWF) since 2007.

Women's doubles
Year	Tournament	Partner	Opponent	Score	Result
2014	Canada Open	(South Korea) Park Sun-young	(South Korea) Choi Hye-in (South Korea) Lee So-hee	15–21, 18–21	(silver) Runner-up

BWF Grand Prix Gold tournament
BWF Grand Prix tournament

=== BWF International Challenge/Series (1 title) ===
Mixed doubles
Year	Tournament	Partner	Opponent	Score	Result
2018	Dubai International	(South Korea) Yoo Yeon-seong	(Russia) Denis Grachev (Russia) Ekaterina Bolotova	21–14, 17–21, 21–14	(gold) Winner

BWF International Challenge tournament
BWF International Series tournament
