= Park Sun-young (badminton) =

South Korean badminton player (born 1985)

Personal information
- Born: 9 March 1985 (age 41) Busan, South Korea

Sport
- Country: South Korea
- Sport: Badminton

Women's & mixed doubles
- Highest ranking: 45 (WD) 28 Aug 2010; 141 (XD) 16 Sep 2010
- BWF profile

- Park Sun-young
- Hangul: 박선영
- RR: Bak Seonyeong
- MR: Pak Sŏnyŏng

Park Sun-young (Korean: 박선영; born 9 March 1985) is a South Korean female badminton player.

== Achievements ==
=== BWF Grand Prix ===
The BWF Grand Prix has two level such as Grand Prix and Grand Prix Gold. It is a series of badminton tournaments, sanctioned by Badminton World Federation (BWF) since 2007.

Women's Doubles
Year	Tournament	Partner	Opponent	Score	Result
2014	Canada Open	(South Korea) Park So-young	(South Korea) Choi Hye-in (South Korea) Lee So-hee	15-21, 18–21	(silver) Runner-up

BWF Grand Prix Gold tournament
BWF Grand Prix tournament

=== BWF International Challenge/Series ===
Women's Doubles
Year	Tournament	Partner	Opponent	Score	Result
2008	Malaysia International	(South Korea) Bae Seung-hee	(South Korea) Kim Mi-young (South Korea) Jang Ye-na	13-21, 21–15, 21–5	(gold) Winner

BWF International Challenge tournament
BWF International Series tournament
BWF Future Series tournament
