= Tseng Min-hao =

Taiwanese badminton player (born 1988)

Tseng Min-hao 曾敏豪
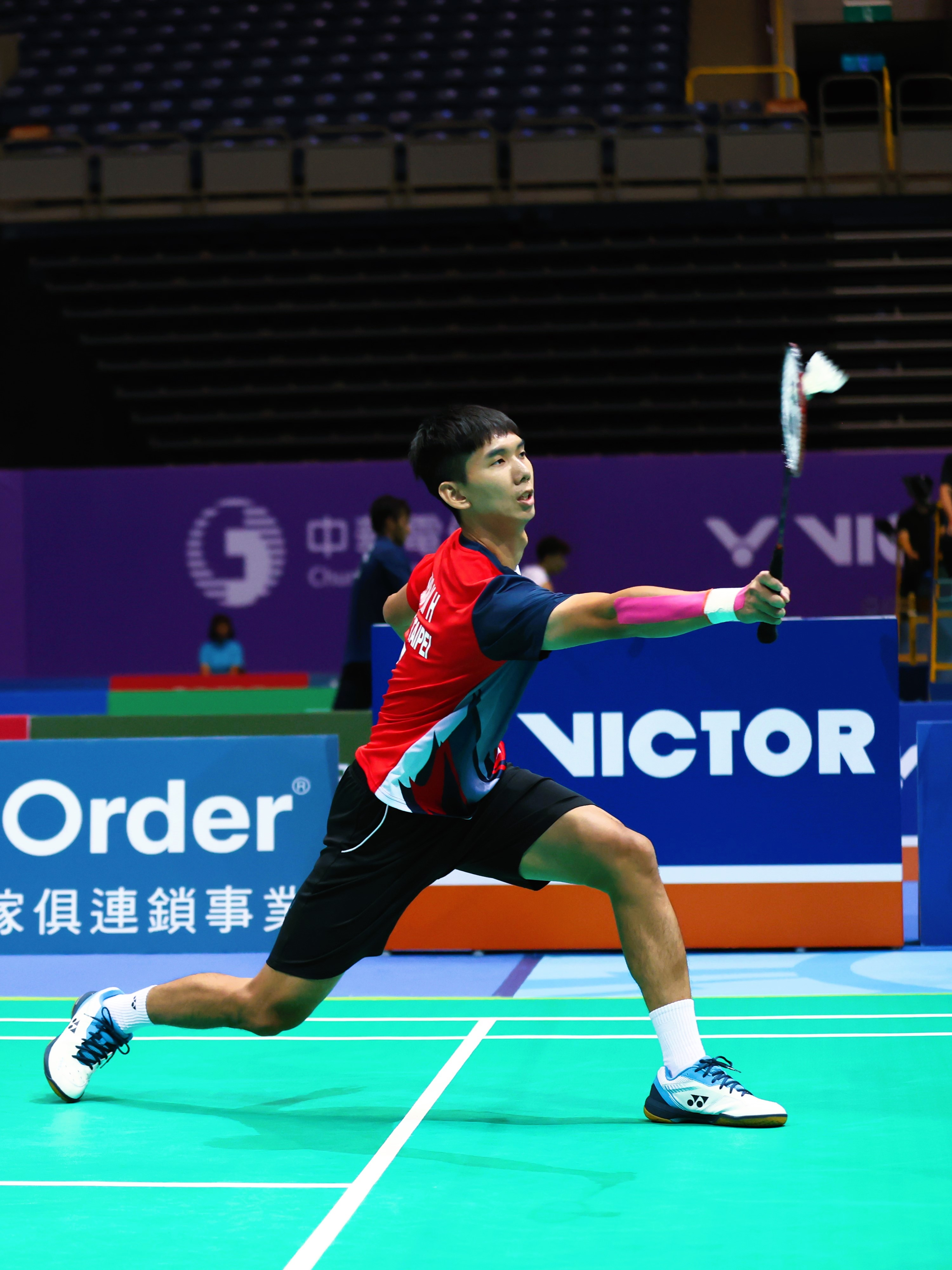
- Tseng at the 2024 Kaohsiung Masters

Personal information
- Born: 15 June 1988 (age 38) Kaohsiung, Taiwan
- Height: 1.85 m (6 ft 1 in)
- Weight: 78 kg (172 lb)

Sport
- Country: Republic of China (Taiwan)
- Sport: Badminton
- Handedness: Right

Men's & mixed doubles
- Highest ranking: 35 (MD 7 April 2016); 28 (XD with Hu Ling-fang 9 November 2017)
- BWF profile
Medal record
Men's badminton
Representing Chinese Taipei
Asian Games
Bronze medal – third place	2014 Incheon	Men's team
Summer Universiade
Bronze medal – third place	2015 Gwangju	Mixed doubles

Tseng Min-hao (Chinese: 曾敏豪; pinyin: Zēng Mǐnháo; born 15 June 1988) is a Taiwanese badminton player.

== Career ==
In 2010, he became the runner-up at the MMOA Kaohsiung International Challenge in the mixed doubles event partnered with Chang Hsin-yun. Partnered with Lai Chia-wen, he won the mixed doubles title at the 2012 Singapore International tournament. In 2014, he became the men's doubles runner-up at the Canada Open Grand Prix tournament teamed-up with Liao Min-chun.

== Achievements ==
=== Summer Universiade ===
Mixed doubles
Year	Venue	Partner	Opponent	Score	Result
2015	Hwasun Hanium Culture Sports Center; Hwasun, South Korea	(Chinese Taipei) Hsieh Pei-chen	(Chinese Taipei) Lu Ching-yao (Chinese Taipei) Chiang Kai-Hsin	15–21, 21–18, 15–21	Bronze

=== BWF Grand Prix (1 runner-up) ===
The BWF Grand Prix has two levels: Grand Prix and Grand Prix Gold. It is a series of badminton tournaments, sanctioned by the Badminton World Federation (BWF) since 2007.

Men's doubles
Year	Tournament	Partner	Opponent	Score	Result
2014	Canada Open	(Chinese Taipei) Liao Min-chun	(Chinese Taipei) Liang Jui-wei (Chinese Taipei) Lu Chia-pin	18–21, 21–16, 16–21	(silver) Runner-up

BWF Grand Prix Gold tournament
BWF Grand Prix tournament

=== BWF International Challenge/Series (4 titles, 4 runners-up) ===
Men's doubles
Year	Tournament	Partner	Opponent	Score	Result
2020	Slovak International	(Chinese Taipei) Lin Shang-kai	(Chinese Taipei) Hung Tzu-wei (Chinese Taipei) Lu Ming-che	30–29, 25–23	(gold) Winner
2018	Malaysia International	(Chinese Taipei) Lin Shang-kai	(South Korea) Ko Sung-hyun (South Korea) Shin Baek-cheol	18–21, 29–30	(silver) Runner-up
2018	Polish International	(Chinese Taipei) Lin Shang-kai	(Poland) Miłosz Bochat (Poland) Adam Cwalina	21–13, 21–16	(gold) Winner

Mixed doubles
Year	Tournament	Partner	Opponent	Score	Result
2020	Slovak International	(Chinese Taipei) Hsieh Pei-shan	(Chinese Taipei) Lu Ming-che (Chinese Taipei) Wu Ti-jung	15–21, 14–21	(silver) Runner-up
2017	Finnish Open	(Chinese Taipei) Hu Ling-fang	(Denmark) Mikkel Mikkelsen (Denmark) Mai Surrow	24–22, 21–16	(gold) Winner
2017	Polish Open	(Chinese Taipei) Hu Ling-fang	(Poland) Robert Mateusiak (Poland) Nadieżda Zięba	22–20, 20–22, 13–21	(silver) Runner-up
2012	Singapore International	(Chinese Taipei) Lai Chia-wen	(Singapore) Chayut Triyachart (Malaysia) Ng Hui Ern	21–16, 21–14	(gold) Winner
2010	Kaohsiung International	(Chinese Taipei) Chang Hsin-yun	(Chinese Taipei) Su Yi-neng (Chinese Taipei) Lai Chia-wen	17–21, 8–21	(silver) Runner-up

BWF International Challenge tournament
BWF International Series tournament
BWF Future Series tournament
