= Agripina Prima Rahmanto Putra =

Indonesian badminton player (born 1991)

Personal information
- Born: 20 January 1991 (age 35)

Sport
- Country: Indonesia
- Sport: Badminton

Men's & mixed doubles
- Highest ranking: 25 (MD 10 January 2013); 113 (XD 21 January 2016)
- BWF profile

Agripina Prima Rahmanto Putra also known as Agripina Prima Rahmanto Pamungkas (born 20 January 1991) is an Indonesian badminton player from Jaya Raya Jakarta badminton club. He was selected to join the national team in 2010.

== Personal life ==
He is the son of the former Indonesian badminton player Sigit Pamungkas. He graduated at the Montfort Secondary School in Singapore.

== BWF suspension ==
In January 2021, the Badminton World Federation (BWF) announced sanctions against eight Indonesian players, including Agripina, following an integrity investigation concerning breaches of regulations related to match fixing, match manipulation and/or betting on badminton. Agripina received a six-year suspension from badminton-related activities. In 2024, Agripina stated that he had rejected an offer to deliberately lose a match at the 2017 Vietnam Open and said that he was sanctioned for failing to report the approach to the BWF.

== Achievements ==
=== ASEAN University Games ===
Men's doubles
Year	Venue	Partner	Opponent	Score	Result	Ref.
2016	Singapore Institute of Management Sports Hall; Singapore	(Indonesia) Rian Swastedian	(Thailand) Trawut Potieng (Thailand) Nanthakarn Yordphaisong	19–21, 16–21	Silver	

Mixed doubles
Year	Venue	Partner	Opponent	Score	Result	Ref.
2016	Singapore Institute of Management Sports Hall, Singapore	(Indonesia) Dian Fitriani	(Indonesia) Rian Swastedian (Indonesia) Aris Budiharti	21–17, 21–13	Gold	

=== BWF Grand Prix (1 runner-up) ===
The BWF Grand Prix had two levels, the Grand Prix and Grand Prix Gold. It was a series of badminton tournaments sanctioned by the Badminton World Federation (BWF) and played between 2007 and 2017.

Men's doubles
Year	Tournament	Partner	Opponent	Score	Result	Ref.
2014	Dutch Open	(Indonesia) Fran Kurniawan	(France) Baptiste Carême (France) Ronan Labar	11–5, 10–11, 10–11, 7–11	(silver) Runner-up	

BWF Grand Prix Gold tournament
BWF Grand Prix tournament

=== BWF International Challenge/Series (3 titles, 6 runners-up) ===
Men's doubles
Year	Tournament	Partner	Opponent	Score	Result	Ref.
2010	Singapore International	(Indonesia) Ricky Karanda Suwardi	(Indonesia) Albert Saputra (Indonesia) Rizki Yanu Kresnayandi	21–19, 12–21, 15–21	(silver) Runner-up	
2011	Singapore International	(Indonesia) Marcus Fernaldi Gideon	(Indonesia) Lukhi Apri Nugroho (Indonesia) Kevin Sanjaya Sukamuljo	21–17, 21–9	(gold) Winner	
2012	Iran Fajr International	(Indonesia) Marcus Fernaldi Gideon	(India) Tarun Kona (India) Arun Vishnu	21–18, 21–18	(gold) Winner	
2012	Vietnam International	(Indonesia) Marcus Fernaldi Gideon	(Indonesia) Ricky Karanda Suwardi (Indonesia) Muhammad Ulinnuha	12–21, 19–21	(silver) Runner-up	
2012	Osaka International	(Indonesia) Marcus Fernaldi Gideon	(Japan) Takeshi Kamura (Japan) Keigo Sonoda	17–21, 23–21, 18–21	(silver) Runner-up	
2013	Indonesia International	(Indonesia) Hardianto	(Indonesia) Didit Juang Indrianto (Indonesia) Praveen Jordan	21–17, 16–21, 21–23	(silver) Runner-up	
2014	Indonesia International	(Indonesia) Fran Kurniawan	(Indonesia) Fajar Alfian (Indonesia) Muhammad Rian Ardianto	11–9, 9–11, 9–11, 8–11	(silver) Runner-up	
2014	Bahrain International Challenge	(Indonesia) Fran Kurniawan	(Indonesia) Afiat Yuris Wirawan (Indonesia) Yohanes Rendy Sugiarto	21–23, 15–21	(silver) Runner-up	

Mixed doubles
Year	Tournament	Partner	Opponent	Score	Result	Ref.
2016	Indonesia International Series	(Indonesia) Apriyani Rahayu	(Indonesia) Yantoni Edy Saputra (Indonesia) Marsheilla Gischa Islami	21–12, 21–12	(gold) Winner	

BWF International Challenge tournament
BWF International Series tournament

=== BWF Junior International (1 title) ===
Boys' doubles
Year	Tournament	Partner	Opponent	Score	Result	Ref.
2009	Singapore Youth International	(Indonesia) Subhan Hasan	(Singapore) Robin Gonansa (Singapore) Huang Chao	21–19, 21–14	(gold) Winner	

BWF Junior International Grand Prix tournament
BWF Junior International Challenge tournament
BWF Junior International Series tournament
BWF Junior Future Series tournament

== Performance timeline ==
=== Individual competitions ===
- Senior level

Tournament	2018	2019	Best
BWF World Tour
Thailand Masters	A	R1	R2 (2016)
Vietnam Open	A	R1	QF (2012)
Indonesia Masters Super 100	R1 (MD); R2 (XD)	R1	R2 (2018)

Tournament	2012	2013	2014	2015	2016	2017	Best
BWF Grand Prix and Grand Prix Gold
Thailand Masters	—N/a				R2	A	R2 (2016)
Vietnam Open	QF (MD)	w/d	R2 (MD)	A		R1 (MD)	QF (2012)
Dutch Open	A		F	A			F (2014)
