= Cheung Ngan Yi =

Hong Kong badminton player (born 1993)

Cheung Ngan Yi 張雁宜
Personal information
- Born: 27 April 1993 (age 33) Hong Kong
- Height: 1.68 m (5 ft 6 in)
- Weight: 57 kg (126 lb)

Sport
- Country: Hong Kong
- Sport: Badminton
- Handedness: Right

Women's singles
- Highest ranking: 13 (15 June 2017)
- Current ranking: 67 (20 September 2022)
- BWF profile
Medal record
Women's badminton
Representing Hong Kong
Asia Mixed Team Championships
Bronze medal – third place	2019 Hong Kong	Mixed team
East Asian Games
Bronze medal – third place	2013 Tianjin	Women's team

Cheung Ngan Yi (Chinese: 張雁宜; Jyutping: zoeng1 ngaan6 ji4; born 27 April 1993) is a Hong Kong badminton player.

== Career ==
Cheung participated in the 2011 BWF World Junior Championships, the 2015 Malaysia Super Series Premier Qualification and in the 2016 Vietnam Open Grand Prix. In 2012, she represented her country in the Uber Cup. Two years later, she participated in the 2014 Asian Games.

She reached semi-finals at the 2013 Austrian International, the 2014 U.S. Open Grand Prix Gold, the 2014 Swiss International and the 2015 New Zealand Open Grand Prix Gold tournaments, won the 2015 Austrian International tournament, and won the women's team bronze medal at the 2013 East Asian Games.

== Achievements ==
=== BWF International Challenge/Series (1 title) ===
Women's singles
Year	Tournament	Opponent	Score	Result
2015	Austrian International	(Bulgaria) Linda Zetchiri	21–16, 21–8	(gold) Winner

BWF International Challenge tournament
BWF International Series tournament
BWF Future Series tournament
