= Hsu Ya-ching =

Taiwanese badminton player (born 1991)

Hsu Ya-ching 許雅晴
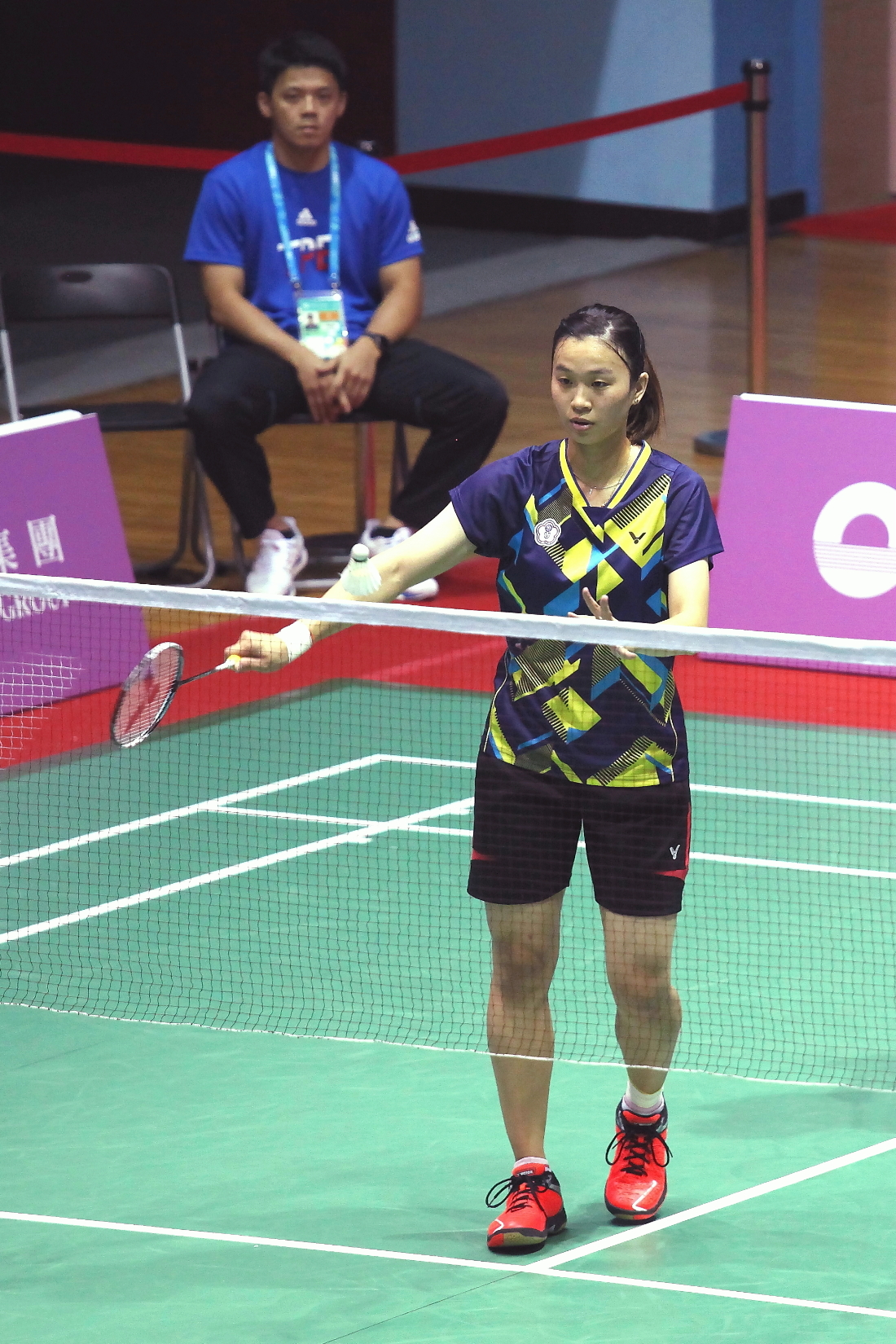
- Hsu at the 2017 Summer Universiade

Personal information
- Born: 30 July 1991 (age 35) Tainan, Taiwan
- Height: 1.65 m (5 ft 5 in)
- Spouse: Lin Chia-yu (m. 2018)

Sport
- Country: Republic of China (Taiwan)
- Sport: Badminton
- Handedness: Right

Women's & mixed doubles
- Highest ranking: 21 (WS, 18 June 2015); 13 (WD with Sung Yu-hsuan, 10 March 2026); 17 (WD with Wu Ti-jung, 15 June 2017); 21 (XD with Lee Jhe-huei, 17 March 2020)
- Current ranking: 18 (WD with Sung Yu-hsuan, 10 November 2026)
- BWF profile
Medal record
Women's badminton
Representing Chinese Taipei
Asia Team Championships
Bronze medal – third place	2026 Qingdao	Women's team
East Asian Games
Silver medal – second place	2009 Hong Kong	Women's team
Summer Universiade
Gold medal – first place	2017 Taipei	Women's doubles
Gold medal – first place	2017 Taipei	Mixed team
Bronze medal – third place	2017 Taipei	Mixed doubles

Hsu Ya-ching (Chinese: 許雅晴; pinyin: Xǔ Yǎqíng; born 30 July 1991) is a Taiwanese badminton player.

== Personal life ==
Hsu is married to former doubles partner Lin Chia-yu.

== Career ==
She started playing badminton at aged 10, then in 2009 she joined Chinese Taipei national badminton team. She participated in the 2015 Malaysia Super Series Premier Qualification, in the 2015 Japan Super Series and in the 2014 Chinese Taipei Open Grand Prix Gold.

== Achievements ==
=== Summer Universiade ===
Women's doubles
Year	Venue	Partner	Opponent	Score	Result
2017	Taipei Gymnasium; Taipei, Taiwan	(Chinese Taipei) Wu Ti-jung	(Thailand) Chayanit Chaladchalam (Thailand) Phataimas Muenwong	21–17, 22–20	Gold

Mixed doubles
Year	Venue	Partner	Opponent	Score	Result
2017	Taipei Gymnasium; Taipei, Taiwan	(Chinese Taipei) Lee Yang	(Malaysia) Nur Mohd Azriyn Ayub (Malaysia) Goh Yea Ching	14–21, 16–21	Bronze

=== World University Championships ===
Mixed doubles
Year	Venue	Partner	Opponent	Score	Result
2016	Sports Palace "Borisoglebskiy"; Ramenskoe, Russia	(Chinese Taipei) Lee Yang	(Malaysia) Mohd Lutfi Zaim Abdul Khalid (Malaysia) Shevon Jamie Lai	21–13, 21–19	Gold

=== BWF World Tour (1 title, 4 runners-up) ===
The BWF World Tour, which was announced on 19 March 2017 and implemented in 2018, is a series of elite badminton tournaments sanctioned by the Badminton World Federation (BWF). The BWF World Tour is divided into levels of World Tour Finals, Super 1000, Super 750, Super 500, Super 300 (part of the HSBC World Tour), and the BWF Tour Super 100.

Women's doubles
Year	Tournament	Level	Partner	Opponent	Score	Result
2019	Orléans Masters	Super 100	(Chinese Taipei) Hu Ling-fang	(England) Chloe Birch (England) Lauren Smith	18–21, 17–21	(silver) Runner-up
2024	Swiss Open	Super 300	(Chinese Taipei) Lin Wan-ching	(Indonesia) Lanny Tria Mayasari (Indonesia) Ribka Sugiarto	21–13, 16–21, 8–21	(silver) Runner-up
2025	U.S. Open	Super 300	(Chinese Taipei) Sung Yu-hsuan	(Thailand) Benyapa Aimsaard (Thailand) Nuntakarn Aimsaard	15–21, 15–21	(silver) Runner-up

Mixed doubles
Year	Tournament	Level	Partner	Opponent	Score	Result
2019	U.S. Open	Super 300	(Chinese Taipei) Lee Jhe-huei	(France) Thom Gicquel (France) Delphine Delrue	21–17, 21–17	(gold) Winner
2019	Vietnam Open	Super 100	(Chinese Taipei) Lee Jhe-huei	(China) Guo Xinwa (China) Zhang Shuxian	21–18, 20–22, 8–21	(silver) Runner-up

=== BWF Grand Prix (1 runner-up) ===
The BWF Grand Prix had two levels, the Grand Prix and Grand Prix Gold. It was a series of badminton tournaments sanctioned by the Badminton World Federation (BWF) and played between 2007 and 2017.

Women's singles
Year	Tournament	Opponent	Score	Result
2016	Dutch Open	(United States) Zhang Beiwen	11–21, 19–21	(silver) Runner-up

BWF Grand Prix Gold tournament
BWF Grand Prix tournament

=== BWF International Challenge/Series (6 titles, 4 runners-up) ===
Women's singles
Year	Tournament	Opponent	Score	Result
2013	Polish International	(Chinese Taipei) Cheng Chi-ya	18–21, 21–14, 17–21	(silver) Runner-up
2013	Malaysia International	(Chinese Taipei) Pai Yu-po	21–6, 21–13	(gold) Winner

Women's doubles
Year	Tournament	Partner	Opponent	Score	Result
2013	Polish International	(Chinese Taipei) Chiang Mei-hui	(Chinese Taipei) Lee Chia-hsin (Chinese Taipei) Wu Ti-jung	10–21, 16–21	(silver) Runner-up
2022	Italian International	(Chinese Taipei) Lin Wan-ching	(Singapore) Jin Yujia (Singapore) Crystal Wong	21–8, 21–8	(gold) Winner
2022	Bonn International	(Chinese Taipei) Lin Wan-ching	(Indonesia) Lanny Tria Mayasari (Indonesia) Jesita Putri Miantoro	21–19, 12–21, 21–16	(gold) Winner
2022	Nantes International	(Chinese Taipei) Lin Wan-ching	(Denmark) Julie Finne-Ipsen (Denmark) Mai Surrow	22–24, 17–21	(silver) Runner-up
2023	Northern Marianas Open	(Chinese Taipei) Lin Wan-ching	(South Korea) Lee Yu-lim (South Korea) Shin Seung-chan	21–19, 18–21, 22–20	(gold) Winner
2023	Saipan International	(Chinese Taipei) Lin Wan-ching	(Japan) Sayaka Hobara (Japan) Yui Suizu	21–10, 21–18	(gold) Winner
2025	Vietnam International	(Chinese Taipei) Sung Yu-hsuan	(Japan) Hina Osawa (Japan) Akari Sato	13–21, 12–21	(silver) Runner-up

Mixed doubles
Year	Tournament	Partner	Opponent	Score	Result
2013	Polish International	(Chinese Taipei) Lin Chia-hsuan	(Chinese Taipei) Lu Ching-yao (Chinese Taipei) Pai Yu-po	12–21, 21–16, 21–18	(gold) Winner

BWF International Challenge tournament
BWF International Series tournament
BWF Future Series tournament
