= Trawut Potieng =

Thai badminton player (born 1991)

Personal information
- Born: 27 April 1991 (age 35)

Sport
- Country: Thailand
- Sport: Badminton

Men's doubles
- Highest ranking: 45 (13 July 2017)
- BWF profile
Medal record
Men's badminton
Representing Thailand
Sudirman Cup
Bronze medal – third place	2017 Gold Coast	Mixed team
SEA Games
Bronze medal – third place	2017 Kuala Lumpur	Men's team

Trawut Potieng (Thai: ตราวุธ โพธิ์เที่ยง; born 27 April 1991) is a Thai badminton player. He won the 2014 Smiling Fish International tournament in the men's doubles event partnered with Watchara Buranakruea.

== Achievements ==
=== BWF International Challenge/Series ===
Men's doubles
Year	Tournament	Partner	Opponent	Score	Result
2014	Smiling Fish International	(Thailand) Watchara Buranakruea	(Thailand) Kittinupong Kedren (Thailand) Dechapol Puavaranukroh	12–21, 21–18, 21–14	(gold) Winner
2017	China International	(Thailand) Nanthakarn Yordphaisong	(Indonesia) Mohammad Ahsan (Indonesia) Rian Agung Saputro	11–8, 7–11, 4–11, 7–11	(silver) Runner-up
2017	Vietnam International	(Thailand) Nanthakarn Yordphaisong	(India) Satwiksairaj Rankireddy (India) Chirag Shetty	21–17, 9–21, 15–21	(silver) Runner-up

BWF International Challenge tournament
BWF International Series tournament
