= 2011 Indonesian Masters Grand Prix Gold =

Tournament details
- Dates: 27 September 2011 – 2 October 2011
- Edition: 2nd
- Total prize money: US$120,000
- Venue: GOR Bulutangkis Palaran
- Location: Samarinda, East Kalimantan, Indonesia

Champions
- Men's singles: (Indonesia) Dionysius Hayom Rumbaka
- Women's singles: (China) Chen Xiaojia
- Men's doubles: (Indonesia) Mohammad Ahsan (Indonesia) Bona Septano
- Women's doubles: (Malaysia) Vivian Hoo Kah Mun (Malaysia) Woon Khe Wei
- Mixed doubles: (China) He Hanbin (China) Bao Yixin

The 2011 Indonesian Masters Grand Prix Gold (officially known as the Bankaltim Indonesia Open GP Gold 2011 for sponsorship reasons) was an international badminton tournament held in Samarinda, East Kalimantan, Indonesia from September 27, 2011 - October 2, 2011.

== Men's singles ==
=== Seeds ===
1. (China) Chen Long (withdrew)
2. (Indonesia) Taufik Hidayat (semi-final)
3. (China) Chen Jin (withdrew)
4. (Denmark) Jan O Jorgensen (withdrew)
5. (China) Wang Zhengming (quarter-final)
6. (Indonesia) Simon Santoso (first round)
7. (Indonesia) Tommy Sugiarto (final)
8. (Indonesia) Dionysius Hayom Rumbaka (champion)

=== Finals ===
Quarterfinals
(Japan) Takuma Ueda	14	16
8	(Indonesia) Dionysius Hayom Rumbaka	21	21
(Indonesia) Alamsyah Yunus	21	21
(Malaysia) Ramdan Misbun	16	14
7	(Indonesia) Tommy Sugiarto	21	21
(Malaysia) Chan Kwong Beng	15	19
5	(China) Wang Zhengming	17	15
2	(Indonesia) Taufik Hidayat	21	21

Semifinals
8	(Indonesia) Dionysius Hayom Rumbaka	24	20	21
(Indonesia) Alamsyah Yunus	22	22	13
7	(Indonesia) Tommy Sugiarto	21	21
2	(Indonesia) Taufik Hidayat	10	15

Final
8	(Indonesia) Dionysius Hayom Rumbaka	21	21
7	(Indonesia) Tommy Sugiarto	16	17

=== Top half ===
==== Section 1 ====
First Round
1	(China) Chen L
BYE
(Thailand) S Avihingsanon	21	21	21
(Indonesia) R Satrio	23	17	17
(Indonesia) B Pamungkas	15	22	14
(Japan) T Ueda	21	20	21
(Indonesia) A Dharma	21	12	21
(Malaysia) Yeoh KB	15	21	18

Second Round
1	(China) Chen L	w	/	o
(Thailand) S Avihingsanon
(Japan) T Ueda	21	21
(Indonesia) A Dharma	12	16

Third Round
(Thailand) S Avihingsanon	17	14
(Japan) T Ueda	21	21

==== Section 2 ====
First Round
8	(Indonesia) H Rumbaka	21	21
(Malaysia) Z Zulkiffli	8	15
(Indonesia) A Wijaya Kusuma	16	9
(Thailand) P Poodchalat	21	21
(Indonesia) Siswanto	18	21	21
(Malaysia) Loke KP	21	19	13
(Indonesia) P Dewantoro	11	18
(Indonesia) A Prasojo	21	21

Second Round
8	(Indonesia) H Rumbaka	21	21
(Thailand) P Poodchalat	12	7
(Indonesia) Siswanto	10	14
(Indonesia) A Prasojo	21	21

Third Round
8	(Indonesia) H Rumbaka	19	21	21
(Indonesia) A Prasojo	21	14	15

==== Section 3 ====
First Round
4	(Denmark) J Jorgensen	wo
(Chinese Taipei) Hsueh H-y
(Canada) M Koreny	13	13
(Indonesia) A Ramadhan	21	21
(Singapore) D Wong	9	15
(Indonesia) A Yunus	21	21
(Czech Republic) L Zevl	19	12
(Indonesia) A Marteen	21	21

Second Round
(Chinese Taipei) Hsueh H-y	16	21	21
(Indonesia) A Ramadhan	21	16	14
(Indonesia) A Yunus	21	21
(Indonesia) A Marteen	12	9

Third Round
(Chinese Taipei) Hsueh H-y	8	15
(Indonesia) A Yunus	21	21

==== Section 4 ====
First Round
6	(Indonesia) S Santoso	17	15
(Malaysia) D Liew	21	21
(Indonesia) F Irvannaldy	22	16	13
(Malaysia) R Misbun	20	21	21
(Indonesia) F Adnan	20	21	21
(Singapore) Huang C	22	16	11
(Singapore) R Gonansa	11	21	21
(Indonesia) P Sudrajat	21	11	16

Second Round
(Malaysia) D Liew	21	10^{r}
(Malaysia) R Misbun	23	16
(Indonesia) F Adnan	23	13
(Singapore) R Gonansa	25	21

Third Round
(Malaysia) R Misbun	21	21
(Singapore) R Gonansa	19	19

=== Bottom half ===
==== Section 5 ====
First Round
(Indonesia) S Rhustavito
(Thailand) T Saensomboonsuk	w	/	o
(Japan) K Sakai	21	21
(Indonesia) A Pratama	15	12
(Indonesia) A Adityawarman	14	21	11
(Chinese Taipei) Shih K-c	21	10	21
(Japan) K Sonoda	7	19
7	(Indonesia) T Sugiarto	21	21

Second Round
(Indonesia) S Rhustavito	21	21
(Japan) K Sakai	13	13
(Chinese Taipei) Shih K-c	17	6
7	(Indonesia) T Sugiarto	21	21

Third Round
(Indonesia) S Rhustavito	15	21	11
7	(Indonesia) T Sugiarto	21	17	21

==== Section 6 ====
First Round
(Indonesia) S Kuncoro	19	15
(Malaysia) Chan KB	21	21
(Indonesia) R Subagja	21	17	21
(Singapore) A Chen	15	21	18
(Indonesia) S Setia Putra	21	21
(Malaysia) Goh SH	14	19
(Malaysia) K Kumar
3	(China) Chen J	wo

Second Round
(Malaysia) Chan KB	21	21
(Indonesia) R Subagja	16	15
(Indonesia) S Setia Putra	21	21
(Malaysia) K Kumar	14	8

Third Round
(Malaysia) Chan KB	21	21
(Indonesia) S Setia Putra	14	16

==== Section 7 ====
First Round
(Malaysia) Kong KZ	wo
(Indonesia) W Prasetyo
(Indonesia) G Adwitya	8	11
(Thailand) P Vilailak	21	21
(Chinese Taipei) Chou T-c	11	21	21
(Malaysia) A Abdul Latif	21	16	23
(Indonesia) I Mustofa	14	18
5	(China) Wang ZM	21	21

Second Round
(Indonesia) W Prasetyo	18	22	14
(Thailand) P Vilailak	21	20	21
(Malaysia) A Abdul Latif	21	12	16
5	(China) Wang ZM	14	21	21

Third Round
(Thailand) P Vilailak	21	19	19
5	(China) Wang ZM	17	21	21

==== Section 8 ====
First Round
(Malaysia) Chong WF	21	21
(Indonesia) R Megananda	12	12
(Netherlands) K Ridder	wo
(Indonesia) R Budhiawan
(Indonesia) E Sukamta	14	14
(Malaysia) I Zainuddin	21	21
(Malaysia) K Yogendran	21	7	13
2	(Indonesia) T Hidayat	17	21	21

Second Round
(Malaysia) Chong WF	21	21
(Indonesia) R Budhiawan	8	12
(Malaysia) I Zainuddin	19	6
2	(Indonesia) T Hidayat	21	21

Third Round
(Malaysia) Chong WF	17	16
2	(Indonesia) T Hidayat	21	21

== Women's singles ==
=== Seeds ===
1. (China) Jiang Yanjiao (withdrew)
2. (Thailand) Ratchanok Intanon (second round)
3. (Japan) Sayaka Sato (quarter-final)
4. (Japan) Eriko Hirose (first round)
5. (Chinese Taipei) Tai Tzu-ying (quarter-final)
6. (France) Pi Hongyan (final)
7. (Japan) Ai Goto (semi-final)
8. (Indonesia) Fransisca Ratnasari (quarter-final)

=== Finals ===
Semifinals
PFQ	(Indonesia) Bellaetrix Manuputty	21	17	19
6	(France) Pi Hongyan	14	21	21
7	(Japan) Ai Goto	11	13
(China) Chen Xiaojia	21	21

Final
6	(France) Pi Hongyan	21	15	17
(China) Chen Xiaojia	19	21	21

=== Top half ===
==== Section 1 ====
First Round
PFQ	(Malaysia) S Saniru	21	21
(Philippines) M Alcala	19	16
PFQ	(Indonesia) B Manuputty	21	21
Q2	(Indonesia) Y Y Susanto	18	5
5	(Chinese Taipei) Tai T-y	21	21
(Malaysia) Tee JY	15	12
(Chinese Taipei) Chen H-h	20	17
(Thailand) S Taerattanachai	22	21

Second Round
PFQ	(Malaysia) S Saniru	9	13
PFQ	(Indonesia) B Manuputty	21	21
5	(Chinese Taipei) Tai T-y	21	17	22
(Thailand) S Taerratanachai	18	21	20

Quarterfinals
PFQ	(Indonesia) B Manuputty	21	21
5	(Chinese Taipei) Tai T-y	16	16

==== Section 2 ====
First Round
4	(Japan) E Hirose	21	12	14
(Indonesia) A Firdasari	9	21	21
(Thailand) N Jindapon	21	21
(Indonesia) R Suwarno	11	8
6	(France) Pi HY	21	24	24
Q4	(Indonesia) Y Asmarani	17	26	22
(Japan) N Okuhara	21	21
(Indonesia) M Kusumastuti	16	11

Second Round
(Indonesia) A Firdasari	18	17
(Thailand) N Jindapon	21	21
6	(France) Pi HY	21	18	21
(Japan) N Okuhara	19	21	17

Quarterfinals
(Thailand) N Jindapon	12	15
6	(France) Pi HY	21	21

=== Bottom half ===
==== Section 3 ====
First Round
(Malaysia) L Cheah	15	21	21
(Indonesia) L Fanetri	21	18	19
(Indonesia) A Rovita	17	18
7	(Japan) A Goto	21	21
(Indonesia) H Desi	25	21
Q3	(Indonesia) M Nadhir	23	19
(Chinese Taipei) Pai H-m	24	23	19
3	(Japan) S Sato	26	21	21

Second Round
(Malaysia) L Cheah	8	18
7	(Japan) A Goto	21	21
(Indonesia) H Desi	16	14
3	(Japan) S Sato	21	21

Quarterfinals
7	(Japan) A Goto	21	21
3	(Japan) S Sato	10	19

==== Section 4 ====
First Round
(Japan) M Mitani	21	21
(Indonesia) A Yuswandari	19	17
Q1	(Indonesia) H Ramadhini	21	13	15
8	(Indonesia) F Ratnasari	19	21	21
(China) Chen XJ	21	21
PFQ	(Indonesia) F Angguni	11	11
(Japan) K Imabeppu	15	13
2	(Thailand) R Intanon	21	21

Second Round
(Japan) M Mitani	18	21
8	(Indonesia) F Ratnasari	21	23
(China) Chen XJ	21	21
2	(Thailand) R Intanon	11	17

Quarterfinals
8	(Indonesia) F Ratnasari	9	17
(China) Chen XJ	21	21

== Men's doubles ==
=== Seeds ===
1. (Indonesia) Mohammad Ahsan / Bona Septano (champion)
2. (Indonesia) Markis Kido / Hendra Setiawan (second round)
3. (Indonesia) Hendra Aprida Gunawan / Alvent Yulianto (quarter-final)
4. (Japan) Hirokatsu Hashimoto / Noriyasu Hirata (quarter-final)
5. (Chinese Taipei) Fang Chieh-min / Lee Sheng-mu (semi-final)
6. (Japan) Naoki Kawamae / Shoji Sato (first round)
7. (Japan) Hiroyuki Endo / Kenichi Hayakawa (final)
8. (Germany) Ingo Kindervater / Johannes Schoettler (second round)

=== Finals ===
Semifinals
1	(Indonesia) Mohammad Ahsan (Indonesia) Bona Septano
5	(Chinese Taipei) Fang Chieh-min (Chinese Taipei) Lee Sheng-mu	wo
7	(Japan) Hiroyuki Endo (Japan) Kenichi Hayakawa	21	21
(Indonesia) Yohanes Rendy Sugiarto (Indonesia) Afiat Yuris Wirawan	16	18

Final
1	(Indonesia) Mohammad Ahsan (Indonesia) Bona Septano	21	21
7	(Japan) Hiroyuki Endo (Japan) Kenichi Hayakawa	13	14

=== Top half ===
==== Section 1 ====
First Round
1	(Indonesia) M Ahsan (Indonesia) B Septano	21	21
PFQ	(Malaysia) Yeoh KB (Malaysia) K Yogendran	13	11
(Indonesia) J Jansen (Indonesia) D Prabudita	15	16
(Thailand) B Issara (Thailand) M Jongjit	21	21
8	(Germany) I Kindervater (Germany) J Schoettler	21	21
(Indonesia) F Kurniawan (Indonesia) W Windarto	19	14
Q1	(Indonesia) D Indrianto (Indonesia) P Jordan	21	19
(Indonesia) M Gideon (Indonesia) A Putra	23	21

Second Round
1	(Indonesia) M Ahsan (Indonesia) B Septano	15	21	21
(Thailand) B Issara (Thailand) M Jongjit	21	19	11
8	(Germany) I Kindervater (Germany) J Schoettler	16	17
(Indonesia) M Gideon (Indonesia) A Putra	21	21

Quarterfinals
1	(Indonesia) M Ahsan (Indonesia) B Septano	21	0
(Indonesia) M Gideon (Indonesia) A Putra	19	0^{r}

==== Section 2 ====
First Round
4	(Japan) H Hashimoto (Japan) N Hirata	21	21
(Malaysia) Mak HC (Malaysia) Ong SH	11	17
(Singapore) A Chen (Singapore) D Wong	13	21
Q4	(Indonesia) T Wardhana (Indonesia) N Widianto	21	23
5	(Chinese Taipei) Fang C-m (Chinese Taipei) Lee S-m	21	21
(China) Liu XL (China) Qiu ZH	11	13
(Indonesia) R Sukmawan (Indonesia) R Wijaya	15	21	13
(Malaysia) Gan TC (Malaysia) Tan BS	21	19	21

Second Round
4	(Japan) H Hashimoto (Japan) N Hirata	21	14	23
Q4	(Indonesia) T Wardhana (Indonesia) N Widianto	14	21	21
5	(Chinese Taipei) Fang C-m (Chinese Taipei) Lee S-m	22	21
(Malaysia) Gan TC (Malaysia) Tan BS	20	17

Quarterfinals
4	(Japan) H Hashimoto (Japan) N Hirata	14	22	15
5	(Chinese Taipei) Fang C-m (Chinese Taipei) Lee S-m	21	20	21

=== Bottom half ===
==== Section 3 ====
First Round
(China) Hong W (China) Shen Y	16	21	21
(Indonesia) A Pratama (Indonesia) R Saputro	21	16	12
(Malaysia) Z Abdul Latif (Malaysia) F Tazari	17	9
7	(Japan) H Endo (Japan) K Hayakawa	21	21
(Malaysia) L Abdul Khalid (Malaysia) V Mawan	12	13
(Chinese Taipei) Liao M-c (Chinese Taipei) Wu C-w	21	21
(Singapore) Liu Y (Singapore) T Yeo	12	11
3	(Indonesia) H Gunawan (Indonesia) A Yulianto	21	21

Second Round
(China) Hong W (China) Shen Y	19	21	17
7	(Japan) H Endo (Japan) K Hayakawa	21	16	21
(Chinese Taipei) Liao M-c (Chinese Taipei) Wu C-w	16	9^{r}
3	(Indonesia) H Gunawan (Indonesia) A Yulianto	21	11

Quarterfinals
7	(Japan) H Endo (Japan) K Hayakawa	21	21
3	(Indonesia) H Gunawan (Indonesia) A Yulianto	14	14

==== Section 4 ====
First Round
(Indonesia) S Kusdianto (Indonesia) R Rianto
(Chinese Taipei) Chen H-l (Chinese Taipei) Lin Y-l	wo
(Indonesia) R Sugiarto (Indonesia) A Wirawan	21	17	21
6	(Japan) N Kawamae (Japan) S Sato	18	21	15
Q2	(Indonesia) R Suwardi (Indonesia) M Ulinnuha	13	19
Q3	(Malaysia) Ow YH (Malaysia) Tan WK	21	21
(Thailand) P Chalardchaleam (Thailand) N Puangpuapech	8	14
2	(Indonesia) M Kido (Indonesia) H Setiawan	21	21

Second Round
(Indonesia) S Kusdianto (Indonesia) R Rianto	24	18
(Indonesia) R Sugiarto (Indonesia) A Wirawan	26	21
Q3	(Malaysia) Ow YH (Malaysia) Tan WK	21	21
2	(Indonesia) M Kido (Indonesia) H Setiawan	17	13

Quarterfinals
(Indonesia) R Sugiarto (Indonesia) A Wirawan	21	21
Q3	(Malaysia) Ow YH (Malaysia) Tan WK	19	17

== Women's doubles ==
=== Seeds ===
1. (Japan) Miyuki Maeda / Satoko Suetsuna (withdrew)
2. (Japan) Mizuki Fujii / Reika Kakiiwa (withdrew)
3. (Chinese Taipei) Cheng Wen-hsing / Chien Yu-chin (withdrew)
4. (Japan) Shizuka Matsuo / Mami Naito (quarter-final)
5. (Indonesia) Meiliana Jauhari / Greysia Polii (withdrew)
6. (China) Cheng Shu / Pan Pan (quarter-final)
7. (Indonesia) Vita Marissa / Nadya Melati (quarter-final)
8. (China) Bao Yixin / Zhong Qianxin (final)

=== Finals ===
Semifinals
(Malaysia) Vivian Hoo Kah Mun (Malaysia) Woon Khe Wei	21	21
(Thailand) Sujitra Ekmongkolpaisarn (Thailand) Punyada Munkitchokecharoen	12	13
8	(China) Bao Yixin (China) Zhong Qianxin	21	21
(Indonesia) Anneke Feinya Agustin (Indonesia) Nitya Krishinda Maheswari	17	18

Final
(Malaysia) Vivian Hoo Kah Mun (Malaysia) Woon Khe Wei	19	21	21
8	(China) Bao Yixin (China) Zhong Qianxin	21	19	18

=== Top half ===
==== Section 1 ====
First Round
PFQ	(Indonesia) A Darajat (Indonesia) F Triyani	15	12
(Malaysia) V Hoo (Malaysia) Woon KW	21	21
BYE
(Indonesia) S Aulia (Indonesia) A Awanda
6	(China) Cheng S (China) Pan P	21	21
(Indonesia) Y Rahayu (Indonesia) A Wahyuni	13	11
(Chinese Taipei) Chang H-y (Chinese Taipei) Lai C-w	15	21	21
Q3	(Indonesia) A Saufika (Indonesia) G Suhendar	21	12	14

Second Round
(Malaysia) V Hoo (Malaysia) Woon KW	16	21	21
(Indonesia) S Aulia (Indonesia) A Awanda	21	9	14
6	(China) Cheng S (China) Pan P	21	21
(Chinese Taipei) Chang H-y (Chinese Taipei) Lai C-w	13	19

Quarterfinals
(Malaysia) V Hoo (Malaysia) Woon KW	21	18	21
6	(China) Cheng S (China) Pan P	15	21	18

==== Section 2 ====
First Round
3	(Chinese Taipei) Cheng W-h (Chinese Taipei) Chien Y-c	wo
(Indonesia) R Amelia (Indonesia) M Oktavianti
(Singapore) Thng TT (Singapore) D Yuliana	9	21
PFQ	(Indonesia) N Kwanrico (Indonesia) D Medita	21	23
PFQ	(Indonesia) R Andriani (Indonesia) M Oklamona	21	21
(Indonesia) T Resmi (Indonesia) D Setiawati	12	13
(Thailand) S Ekmongkolpaisarn (Thailand) P Munkitchokecharoen
BYE

Second Round
(Indonesia) R Amelia (Indonesia) M Oktavianti	18	17
PFQ	(Indonesia) N Kwanrico (Indonesia) D Medita	21	21
PFQ	(Indonesia) R Andriani (Indonesia) M Oklamona	17	17
(Thailand) S Ekmongkolpaisarn (Thailand) P Munkitchokecharoen	21	21

Quarterfinals
PFQ	(Indonesia) N Kwanrico (Indonesia) D Medita	19	21	13
(Thailand) S Ekmongkolpaisarn (Thailand) P Munkitchokecharoen	21	11	21

=== Bottom half ===
==== Section 3 ====
First Round
(Chinese Taipei) Hsieh P-c (Chinese Taipei) Wang P-r	16	21	21
(Indonesia) K Dewi (Indonesia) J Gozali	21	12	19
(Indonesia) S Andini (Indonesia) D Haris	15	19
8	(China) Bao YX (China) Zhong QX	21	21
PFQ	(Indonesia) A Budiharti (Indonesia) D Fitriani	18	15
(Turkey) V Aprilsasi (Indonesia) L Nurlita	21	21
(Indonesia) K Hanadia (Indonesia) D Permatasari	18	16
4	(Japan) S Matsuo (Japan) M Naito	21	21

Second Round
(Chinese Taipei) Hsieh P-c (Chinese Taipei) Wang P-r	16	14
8	(China) Bao YX (China) Zhong QX	21	21
(Turkey) V Aprilsasi (Indonesia) L Nurlita	14	21	7
4	(Japan) S Matsuo (Japan) M Naito	21	19	21

Quarterfinals
8	(China) Bao YX (China) Zhong QX	23	21
4	(Japan) S Matsuo (Japan) M Naito	21	19

==== Section 4 ====
First Round
(Malaysia) Lim YL (Malaysia) M Ng	14	21	21
(Indonesia) G Imawan (Indonesia) T Nuraidah	21	16	13
(China) Tang JH (China) Xia H	21	19	17
7	(Indonesia) V Marissa (Indonesia) N Melati	15	21	21
Q4	(Indonesia) M Giovani (Indonesia) H Ramadhini	12	8
(Indonesia) A Agustin (Indonesia) N Maheswari	21	21
(Thailand) S Amitrapai (Thailand) N Somsri	21	21
PFQ	(Indonesia) K Rosmini (Indonesia) G Widjaja	15	14

Second Round
(Malaysia) Lim YL (Malaysia) M Ng	15	16
7	(Indonesia) V Marissa (Indonesia) N Melati	21	21
(Indonesia) A Agustin (Indonesia) N Maheswari	21	21
(Thailand) S Amitrapai (Thailand) N Somsri	18	8

Quarterfinals
7	(Indonesia) V Marissa (Indonesia) N Melati	13	11
(Indonesia) A Agustin (Indonesia) N Maheswari	21	21

== Mixed doubles ==
=== Seeds ===
1. (Indonesia) Tontowi Ahmad / Lilyana Natsir (second round)
2. (Chinese Taipei) Chen Hung-ling / Cheng Wen-hsing (withdrew)
3. (Indonesia) Fran Kurniawan / Pia Zebadiah Bernadeth (second round)
4. (China) Xu Chen / Ma Jin (final)
5. (Germany) Michael Fuchs / Birgit Michels (first round)
6. (Chinese Taipei) Lee Sheng-mu / Chien Yu-chin (withdrew)
7. (Japan) Shintaro Ikeda / Reiko Shiota (quarter-final)
8. (Indonesia) Muhammad Rijal / Debby Susanto (first round)

=== Finals ===
Semifinals
(Indonesia) Nova Widianto (Indonesia) Vita Marissa	17	21	13
4	(China) Xu Chen (China) Ma Jin	21	16	21
(China) Hong Wei (China) Pan Pan	13	22	11
(China) He Hanbin (China) Bao Yixin	21	20	21

Final
4	(China) Xu Chen (China) Ma Jin	19	4^{r}
(China) He Hanbin (China) Bao Yixin	21	1

=== Top half ===
==== Section 1 ====
First Round
1	(Indonesia) T Ahmad (Indonesia) L Natsir	21	21
Q4	(Indonesia) L Nugroho (Indonesia) R Amelia	9	14
PFQ	(Indonesia) A Anhar (Indonesia) K Hanadia	17	19
(Indonesia) N Widianto (Indonesia) V Marissa	21	21
6	(Chinese Taipei) Lee S-m (Chinese Taipei) Chien Y-c	wo
(Japan) S Sato (Japan) S Matsuo
(China) Qiu ZH (China) Xia H	21	21
(Indonesia) R Nugraha (Indonesia) R Dili	15	11

Second Round
1	(Indonesia) T Ahmad (Indonesia) L Natsir	21	15	17
(Indonesia) N Widianto (Indonesia) V Marissa	13	21	21
(Japan) S Sato (Japan) S Matsuo	21	20	21
(China) Qiu ZH (China) Xia H	15	22	15

Quarterfinals
(Indonesia) N Widianto (Indonesia) V Marissa	15	21	21
(Japan) S Sato (Japan) S Matsuo	21	11	15

==== Section 2 ====
First Round
4	(China) Xu C (China) Ma J	21	21
Q3	(Malaysia) Mak HC (Malaysia) Lim YL	14	9
(Malaysia) Tan AQ (Malaysia) Lai PJ	17	19
(Chinese Taipei) Fang C-m (Chinese Taipei) Wang P-r	21	21
5	(Germany) M Fuchs (Germany) B Michels	15	21	15
(Indonesia) R Wijaya (Indonesia) M Christina	21	15	21
(Indonesia) P Rhoma (Indonesia) A Budiharti	9	12
(Thailand) M Jongjit (Thailand) S Amitrapai	21	21

Second Round
4	(China) Xu C (China) Ma J	17	21	21
(Chinese Taipei) Fang C-m (Chinese Taipei) Wang P-r	21	17	13
(Indonesia) R Wijaya (Indonesia) M Christina	10	18
(Thailand) M Jongjit (Thailand) S Amitrapai	21	21

Quarterfinals
4	(China) Xu C (China) Ma J	21	21
(Thailand) M Jongjit (Thailand) S Amitrapai	19	17

=== Bottom half ===
==== Section 3 ====
First Round
(China) Hong W (China) Pan P	21	21
(Malaysia) R Abdul Latif (Malaysia) A Anscelly	14	8
(Chinese Taipei) Liao M-c (Chinese Taipei) Chen H-h	13	21	21
8	(Indonesia) M Rijal (Indonesia) D Susanto	21	16	17
(Indonesia) Hardianto (Indonesia) A Rahmasari	20	21	15
PFQ	(Indonesia) J Jansen (Indonesia) N Kwanrico	22	18	21
Q3	(Singapore) T Yeo (Singapore) D Yuliana	13	20
3	(Indonesia) F Kurniawan (Indonesia) P Z Bernadeth	21	22

Second Round
(China) Hong W (China) Pan P	19	21	21
(Chinese Taipei) Liao M-c (Chinese Taipei) Chen H-h	21	18	12
PFQ	(Indonesia) J Jansen (Indonesia) N Kwanrico	21	21
3	(Indonesia) F Kurniawan (Indonesia) P Z Bernadeth	18	16

Quarterfinals
(China) Hong W (China) Pan P	21	21
PFQ	(Indonesia) J Jansen (Indonesia) N Kwanrico	11	16

==== Section 4 ====
First Round
(Indonesia) R Widianto (Indonesia) S Irawati	21	26	10
(Thailand) N Puangpuapech (Thailand) N Somsri	15	28	21
(Chinese Taipei) Lin Y-l (Chinese Taipei) Hsieh P-c	13	19
7	(Japan) S Ikeda (Japan) R Shiota	21	21
Q1	(Malaysia) Tan WK (Malaysia) Woon KW	15	21	18
(Indonesia) I Fadhilah (Indonesia) W Anggraini	21	14	21
(China) He HB (China) Bao YX
2	(Chinese Taipei) Chen H-l (Chinese Taipei) Cheng W-h	wo

Second Round
(Thailand) N Puangpuapech (Thailand) N Somsri	14	11
7	(Japan) S Ikeda (Japan) R Shiota	21	21
(Indonesia) I Fadhilah (Indonesia) W Anggraini	22	18
(China) He HB (China) Bao YX	24	21

Quarterfinals
7	(Japan) S Ikeda (Japan) R Shiota	21	22	19
(China) He HB (China) Bao YX	17	24	21
