= Komala Dewi =

Indonesian badminton player (born 1989)

Personal information
- Born: 1 September 1989 (age 37) Sumedang, Indonesia
- Height: 1.64 m (5 ft 5 in)

Sport
- Country: Indonesia
- Sport: Badminton
- Handedness: Right

Women's & mixed doubles
- Highest ranking: 23 (WD with Jenna Gozali 30 May 2013); 35 (XD with Fran Kurniawan 10 September 2015)
- BWF profile
Medal record
Women's badminton
Representing Indonesia
Summer Universiade
Gold medal – first place	2011 Shenzhen	Mixed team

Komala Dewi (born 1 September 1989) is an Indonesian badminton player, specializing in doubles play. Dewi joined PB Djarum badminton club in 2007, then in the same year she won the Jakarta Open.

== Achievements ==
=== BWF Grand Prix ===
The BWF Grand Prix had two levels, the Grand Prix and Grand Prix Gold. It was a series of badminton tournaments sanctioned by the Badminton World Federation (BWF) and played between 2007 and 2017.

Women's doubles
Year	Tournament	Partner	Opponent	Score	Result
2012	India Grand Prix Gold	(Indonesia) Jenna Gozali	(Thailand) Savitree Amitrapai (Thailand) Sapsiree Taerattanachai	12–21, 6–21	(silver) Runner-up

BWF Grand Prix Gold tournament
BWF Grand Prix tournament

=== BWF International Challenge/Series ===
Women's doubles
Year	Tournament	Partner	Opponent	Score	Result
2010	Indonesia International	(Indonesia) Keshya Nurvita Hanadia	(Indonesia) Suci Rizki Andini (Indonesia) Della Destiara Haris	18–21, 21–12, 10–21	(silver) Runner-up
2011	Vietnam International	(Indonesia) Jenna Gozali	(South Korea) Choi Hye-in (South Korea) Lee Se-rang	21–15, 10–21, 13–21	(silver) Runner-up
2014	USM Indonesia International	(Indonesia) Meiliana Jauhari	(Indonesia) Dian Fitriani (Indonesia) Nadya Melati	21–14, 12–21, 17–21	(silver) Runner-up
2014	Bulgarian International	(Indonesia) Ririn Amelia	(Indonesia) Della Destiara Haris (Indonesia) Gebby Ristiyani Imawan	9–21, 21–18, 18–21	(silver) Runner-up

Mixed doubles
Year	Tournament	Partner	Opponent	Score	Result
2014	Bulgarian International	(Indonesia) Fran Kurniawan	(Germany) Max Schwenger (Germany) Carla Nelte	18–21, 21–19, 21–13	(gold) Winner
2014	Bahrain International Challenge	(Indonesia) Fran Kurniawan	(Russia) Vitalij Durkin (Russia) Nina Vislova	8–21, 10–21	(silver) Runner-up
2015	Vietnam International	(Indonesia) Fran Kurniawan	(Indonesia) Hafiz Faizal (Indonesia) Masita Mahmudin	21–14, 21–11	(gold) Winner
2015	Indonesia International	(Indonesia) Fran Kurniawan	(South Korea) Chung Eui-seok (South Korea) Kong Hee-yong	21–12, 16–21, 21–13	(gold) Winner

BWF International Challenge tournament
BWF International Series tournament
BWF Future Series tournament
