= Indonesia at the 2011 Summer Universiade =

- IOC code: INA
- NOC: Indonesian Olympic Committee
- Website: www.nocindonesia.or.id

in Shenzhen
- Competitors: 54 in 9 sports
- Officials: 46
- Medals Ranked 20th: Gold 3 Silver 1 Bronze 2 Total 6

Summer Universiade appearances
- 1959; 1961; 1963; 1965; 1967; 1970; 1973; 1975; 1977; 1979; 1981; 1983; 1985; 1987; 1989; 1991; 1993; 1995; 1997; 1999; 2001; 2003; 2005; 2007; 2009; 2011; 2013; 2015; 2017; 2019; 2021; 2025; 2027

Indonesia fielded a team of 54 student-athletes in nine sports held at the 2011 Summer Universiade in Shenzhen, China.

== Medalists ==
Medal	Name	Sport	Event	Date
Gold	Eko Yuli Irawan	Weightlifting	Men's 62 kg	15 August
Gold	Deni	Weightlifting	Men's 69 kg	15 August
Gold	Mixed team	Badminton	Mixed team	18 August
Silver	Surahmat bin Suwito Wijoyo	Weightlifting	Men's 56 kg	15 August
Bronze	Riky Widianto Shendy Puspa Irawati	Badminton	Mixed doubles	22 August
Bronze	Yohanes Rendy Sugiarto Afiat Yuris Wirawan	Badminton	Men's doubles	22 August

== Athletics ==
=== Women ===
==== 10,000 m Final ====
Pos	Time	Athlete	Medal
1	33:11.92	Fadime Suna (TUR)	1st place, gold medalist(s)
2	33:15.57	Hanae Tanaka (JPN)	2nd place, silver medalist(s)
3	33:41.90	Mai Ishibashi (JPN)	3rd place, bronze medalist(s)
4	34:04.92	Triyaningsih (INA)	
5	34:05.60	Jiang Xiaoli (CHN)	
6	35:05.19	Maria Danielle Trevis (NZL)	
7	35:46.28	Giovanna Epis (ITA)	
8	36:17.46	Volha Minina (BLR)	
9	36:35.30	Vaida Žūsinaitė (LTU)	
10	36:47.9	Annet Chebet (UGA)	

== Gymnastics ==
Indonesia's aerobic gymnastics trio qualified but did not medal.

== Swimming ==
Indonesia sent a men's and women's swimming team of 8 swimmers.

=== Men ===
Event	Athletes	Heat		Final	
Event	Athletes	Time	Position	Time	Position
50 m backstroke	Glenn Victor Sutanto	26.44	15	did not advance	
50 m backstroke	Guntur Pratama Putra	DNS	-	did not advance	
100 m backstroke	Glenn Victor Sutanto	56.71	25	did not advance	
200 m backstroke	Glenn Victor Sutanto	2:09.22	26	did not advance	
200 m breaststroke	Mochamad Idham Dasuki	DNS	-	did not advance	
200 m breaststroke	Muhammad Akbar Nasution	2:22.03	25	did not advance	
50 m butterfly	Glenn Victor Sutanto	24.61	12	did not advance	
50 m butterfly	Guntur Pratama Putra	25.07	25	did not advance	
200 m butterfly	Triadi Fauzi Sidik	2:04.25	31	did not advance	
4 × 100 m freestyle relay	Nicko Biondi Ricardo; Triadi Fauzi Sidik; Guntur Pratama Putra; Glenn Victor Sutanto	3:34.07	19	did not advance	

=== Women ===
Event	Athletes	Heat		Final	
Event	Athletes	Time	Position	Time	Position
100 m freestyle	Enny Susilawati Margono	57.67	27	did not advance	
100 m freestyle	Kathriana Mella Gustianjani	1:00.71	40	did not advance	
