= Jenna Gozali =

Indonesian badminton player

Personal information
- Born: 24 March 1990 (age 36) Surabaya, East Java, Indonesia
- Height: 1.66 m (5 ft 5 in)

Sport
- Country: United States
- Sport: Badminton
- Handedness: Right

Women's & mixed doubles
- Highest ranking: 23 (WD 6 June 2013); 116 (XD 9 September 2010)
- BWF profile
Medal record
Women's badminton
Representing Indonesia
Summer Universiade
Gold medal – first place	2011 Shenzhen	Mixed team

Jenna Gozali (born 24 March 1990) is a former Indonesian badminton player from the PB Djarum club. Gozali now bearing the United States flag in the international tournament as a Bay Badminton Center player.

== Achievements ==
=== BWF Grand Prix (1 runner-up) ===
The BWF Grand Prix had two levels, the Grand Prix and Grand Prix Gold. It was a series of badminton tournaments sanctioned by the Badminton World Federation (BWF) and played between 2007 and 2017.

Women's doubles
Year	Tournament	Partner	Opponent	Score	Result
2012	India Grand Prix Gold	(Indonesia) Komala Dewi	(Thailand) Savitree Amitrapai (Thailand) Sapsiree Taerattanachai	12–21, 6–21	(silver) Runner-up

BWF Grand Prix Gold tournament
BWF Grand Prix tournament

=== BWF International Challenge/Series (2 titles, 3 runners-up) ===
Women's doubles
Year	Tournament	Partner	Opponent	Score	Result
2009	Auckland International	(Indonesia) Rufika Olivta	(New Zealand) Michelle Chan (New Zealand) Rachel Hindley	21–16, 21–11	(gold) Winner
2010	Singapore International	(Indonesia) Aprilsasi Putri Lejarsar Variella	(South Korea) Yim Jae-eun (South Korea) Lee Se-rang	19–21, 12–21	(silver) Runner-up
2011	Vietnam International	(Indonesia) Komala Dewi	(South Korea) Choi Hye-in (South Korea) Lee Se-rang	21–15, 10–21, 13–21	(silver) Runner-up

Mixed doubles
Year	Tournament	Partner	Opponent	Score	Result
2009	Lao International	(Indonesia) Muhammad Ulinnuha	(Vietnam) Dương Bảo Đức (Vietnam) Thái Thị Hồng Gấm	17–21, 23–21, 18–21	(silver) Runner-up
2016	Manhattan Beach International	(Indonesia) David Yedija Pohan	(United States) Tony Gunawan (United States) Mirabelle Huang	21–15, 21–13	(gold) Winner

BWF International Challenge tournament
BWF International Series tournament
BWF Future Series tournament

=== BWF Junior International (1 title, 1 runner-up) ===
Mixed doubles
Year	Tournament	Partner	Opponent	Score	Result
2009	Dutch Juniors	(Indonesia) Muhammad Ulinnuha	(Malaysia) Iskandar Zulkarnain Zainuddin (Malaysia) Tee Jing Yi	14–21, 21–13, 22–20	(gold) Winner
2009	German Juniors	(Indonesia) Muhammad Ulinnuha	(South Korea) Kang Ji-wook (South Korea) Choi Hye-in	20–22, 17–21	(silver) Runner-up

BWF Junior International Grand Prix tournament
BWF Junior International Challenge tournament
BWF Junior International Series tournament
BWF Junior Future Series tournament
