= Badminton at the 2019 SEA Games – Men's team =

Badminton – Men's team at the 2019 SEA Games
- Venue: Muntinlupa Sports Complex
- Dates: 1–4 December
- Nations: 7

Medalists
gold medal	Indonesia (INA)
silver medal	Malaysia (MAS)
bronze medal	Thailand (THA)
bronze medal	Singapore (SGP)

The badminton men's team tournament at the 2019 SEA Games in Manila was held from 1 to 4 December 2019 at the Muntinlupa Sports Complex, Metro Manila, Philippines.

== Schedule ==
All times are Philippines Standard Time (UTC+08:00)

Date	Time	Event
Sunday, 1 December	15:00	Quarter-finals
Monday, 2 December	15:30	Semi-finals
Wednesday, 4 December	10:00	Final

== Results ==
Quarter-finals
Thailand (THA)	3
Cambodia (CAM)	0
Myanmar (MYA)	0
Singapore (SGP)	3
Philippines (PHI)	0
Malaysia (MAS)	3

Semi-finals
Indonesia (INA)	3
Thailand (THA)	0
Singapore (SGP)	0
Malaysia (MAS)	3

Final
Indonesia (INA)	3
Malaysia (MAS)	1

=== Quarter-finals ===
1 December	Thailand (THA)	3–0	Cambodia (CAM)

Kantaphon Wangcharoen	2–0	Tep Chanmara	21–8, 21–13
Sitthikom Thammasin	2–0	Leng Sopheaktra	21–5, 21–9
Bodin Isara / Maneepong Jongjit	2–0	Cheng Phorrom / Sieng Kimhong	21–13, 21–9
Suppanyu Avihingsanon		Saom Dyna	not played
Kittisak Namdash / Nipitphon Phuangphuapet		Leng Sopheaktra / Tep Chanmara	not played

1 December	Myanmar (MYA)	0–3	Singapore (SGP)

Phone Pyae Naing	0–2	Loh Kean Yew	12–21, 5–21
Aung Myo Htoo	1–2	Jason Teh	16–21, 21–13, 9–21
Chan Win Oo	0–2	Elaf Tan	11–21, 19–21
Aung Myo Htoo / Phone Pyae Naing		Terry Hee / Loh Kean Hean	not played
Chan Win Oo / Hein Si Thu Toe		Danny Bawa Chrisnanta / Andy Kwek	not played

1 December	Philippines (PHI)	0–3	Malaysia (MAS)

Ros Pedrosa	0–2	Lee Zii Jia	12–21, 8–21
Peter Gabriel Magnaye / Alvin Morada	0–2	Aaron Chia / Soh Wooi Yik	17–21, 14–21
Lanz Ralf Zafra	0–2	Soong Joo Ven	15–21, 17–21
Philip Joper Escueta / Paul Pantig		Goh Soon Huat / Ong Yew Sin	not played
Solomon Padiz jr.		Aidil Sholeh	not played

=== Semi-finals ===
2 December	Indonesia (INA)	3–0	Thailand (THA)

Jonatan Christie	2–1	Kantaphon Wangcharoen	22–20, 8–21, 21–8
Fajar Alfian / Muhammad Rian Ardianto	2–1	Bodin Isara / Maneepong Jongjit	22–20, 19–21, 21–17
Anthony Sinisuka Ginting	2–0	Sitthikom Thammasin	21-14, 21-13
Wahyu Nayaka / Ade Yusuf		Kittisak Namdash / Nipitphon Phuangphuapet	not played
Shesar Hiren Rhustavito		Suppanyu Avihingsanon	not played

2 December	Singapore (SGP)	0–3	Malaysia (MAS)

Loh Kean Yew	0–2	Lee Zii Jia	18–21, 12–21
Terry Hee / Loh Kean Hean	1–2	Aaron Chia / Soh Wooi Yik	22–20, 13–21, 16–21
Joel Koh	1–2	Soong Joo Ven	21–14, 8–21, 16–21
Danny Bawa Chrisnanta / Andy Kwek		Ong Yew Sin / Teo Ee Yi	not played
Jason Teh		Lim Chong King	not played

=== Final ===
4 December	Indonesia (INA)	3–1	Malaysia (MAS)

Jonatan Christie	2–0	Lee Zii Jia	21–9, 21–17
Fajar Alfian / Muhammad Rian Ardianto	0–2	Aaron Chia / Soh Wooi Yik	17–21, 13–21
Anthony Sinisuka Ginting	2–1	Soong Joo Ven	13–21, 21–15, 21–18
Wahyu Nayaka / Ade Yusuf	2–0	Ong Yew Sin / Teo Ee Yi	21–16, 21–19
Shesar Hiren Rhustavito		Lim Chong King	not played

== See also ==
- Women's team tournament
- Individual event
