= Badminton at the Summer World University Games =

- Events: 6 (men: 2; women: 2; mixed: 2)

Games
- 1959; 1960; 1961; 1962; 1963; 1964; 1965; 1966; 1967; 1968; 1970; 1970; 1973; 1972; 1975; 1975; 1977; 1978; 1979; 1981; 1983; 1985; 1987; 1989; 1991; 1993; 1995; 1997; 1999; 2001; 2003; 2005; 2007; 2009; 2011; 2013; 2015; 2017; 2019; 2021; 2025

Badminton competition has been in the Universiade since 2007, with singles, doubles and mixed events for both men and women.

== Events ==
Event	07	11	13	15	17	21	25
Men's singles	•	•	•	•	•	•	•
Men's doubles	•	•	•	•	•	•	•
Women's singles	•	•	•	•	•	•	•
Women's doubles	•	•	•	•	•	•	•
Mixed doubles	•	•	•	•	•	•	•
Mixed team	•	•	•	•	•	•	•
Events	6	6	6	6	6	6	6

== Editions ==
Games	Year	Host city	Host country	Winner	Second	Third
XXIV	2007	Bangkok	Thailand	Thailand	China	Chinese Taipei
XXVI	2011	Shenzhen	China	Thailand	South Korea	Chinese Taipei
XXVII	2013	Kazan	Russia	South Korea	Thailand	China
XXVIII	2015	Gwangju	South Korea	South Korea	China	Chinese Taipei
XXVIX	2017	Taipei	Taiwan	Chinese Taipei	South Korea	Japan
XXXII	2021	Chengdu	China	China	Chinese Taipei	Thailand
XXXIII	2025	Mülheim	Germany	Chinese Taipei	China	Thailand

== Medal table ==
Last updated during the 2025 Summer World University Games

Rank	Nation	Gold	Silver	Bronze	Total
1	South Korea (KOR)	16	4	5	25
2	Chinese Taipei (TPE)	11	13	20	44
3	China (CHN)	7	15	12	34
4	Thailand (THA)	7	4	17	28
5	Indonesia (INA)	1	0	3	4
6	Japan (JPN)	0	3	10	13
7	Malaysia (MAS)	0	1	11	12
8	Russia (RUS)	0	1	2	3
9	France (FRA)	0	1	0	1
10	United States (USA)	0	0	2	2
11	Hong Kong (HKG)	0	0	1	1
11	India (IND)	0	0	1	1
Totals (12 entries)		42	42	84	168

== Medalists ==
=== Men's singles ===
Event	Gold	Silver	Bronze
(Thailand) 2007 Bangkok	Boonsak Ponsana; Thailand	Chen Hong; China	Liao Sheng-shiun; Chinese Taipei
(Thailand) 2007 Bangkok	Boonsak Ponsana; Thailand	Chen Hong; China	Poompat Sapkulchannart; Thailand
(China) 2011 Shenzhen	Suppanyu Avihingsanon; Thailand	Wen Kai; China	Takuma Ueda; Japan
(China) 2011 Shenzhen	Suppanyu Avihingsanon; Thailand	Wen Kai; China	Hsueh Hsuan-yi; Chinese Taipei
(Russia) 2013 Kazan	Tanongsak Saensomboonsuk; Thailand	Gao Huan; China	Iskandar Zulkarnain Zainuddin; Malaysia
(Russia) 2013 Kazan	Tanongsak Saensomboonsuk; Thailand	Gao Huan; China	Chou Tien-chen; Chinese Taipei
(South Korea) 2015 Gwangju	Jeon Hyeok-jin; South Korea	Son Wan-ho; South Korea	Chou Tien-chen; Chinese Taipei
(South Korea) 2015 Gwangju	Jeon Hyeok-jin; South Korea	Son Wan-ho; South Korea	Hsu Jen-hao; Chinese Taipei
(Taiwan) 2017 Taipei	Wang Tzu-wei; Chinese Taipei	Kenta Nishimoto; Japan	Pannawit Thongnuam; Thailand
(Taiwan) 2017 Taipei	Wang Tzu-wei; Chinese Taipei	Kenta Nishimoto; Japan	Yu Igarashi; Japan
(China) 2021 Chengdu	Wang Zhengxing; China	Panitchaphon Teeraratsakul; Thailand	Ko Shing Hei; Hong Kong
(China) 2021 Chengdu	Wang Zhengxing; China	Panitchaphon Teeraratsakul; Thailand	Toma Noda; Japan
(Germany) 2025 Rhine-Ruhr	Ting Yen-chen; Chinese Taipei	Enogat Roy; France	Zhou Xinyu; China
(Germany) 2025 Rhine-Ruhr	Ting Yen-chen; Chinese Taipei	Enogat Roy; France	Rei Miyashita; Japan

=== Women's singles ===
Event	Gold	Silver	Bronze
(Thailand) 2007 Bangkok	Wang Yihan; China	Cheng Shao-chieh; Chinese Taipei	Moltijla Meemeak; Thailand
(Thailand) 2007 Bangkok	Wang Yihan; China	Cheng Shao-chieh; Chinese Taipei	Wang Lin; China
(China) 2011 Shenzhen	Cheng Shao-chieh; Chinese Taipei	Pai Hsiao-ma; Chinese Taipei	Liu Fanghua; China
(China) 2011 Shenzhen	Cheng Shao-chieh; Chinese Taipei	Pai Hsiao-ma; Chinese Taipei	Shi Xiaoqian; China
(Russia) 2013 Kazan	Sung Ji-hyun; South Korea	Tai Tzu-ying; Chinese Taipei	Yao Xue; China
(Russia) 2013 Kazan	Sung Ji-hyun; South Korea	Tai Tzu-ying; Chinese Taipei	Porntip Buranaprasertsuk; Thailand
(South Korea) 2015 Gwangju	Sung Ji-hyun; South Korea	Porntip Buranaprasertsuk; Thailand	Shiho Tanaka; Japan
(South Korea) 2015 Gwangju	Sung Ji-hyun; South Korea	Porntip Buranaprasertsuk; Thailand	Tai Tzu-ying; Chinese Taipei
(Taiwan) 2017 Taipei	Tai Tzu-ying; Chinese Taipei	Lee Jang-mi; South Korea	Chiang Mei-hui; Chinese Taipei
(Taiwan) 2017 Taipei	Tai Tzu-ying; Chinese Taipei	Lee Jang-mi; South Korea	Yang Li Lian; Malaysia
(China) 2021 Chengdu	Han Yue; China	Kim Ga-ram; South Korea	Zhang Yiman; China
(China) 2021 Chengdu	Han Yue; China	Kim Ga-ram; South Korea	Hsu Wen-chi; Chinese Taipei
(Germany) 2025 Rhine-Ruhr	Thamonwan Nithiittikrai; Thailand	Tidapron Kleebyeesun; Thailand	Wong Ling Ching; Malaysia
(Germany) 2025 Rhine-Ruhr	Thamonwan Nithiittikrai; Thailand	Tidapron Kleebyeesun; Thailand	Ella Lin; United States

=== Men's doubles ===
Event	Gold	Silver	Bronze
(Thailand) 2007 Bangkok	Phattapol Ngensrisuk; Sudket Prapakamol; Thailand	Hsieh Yu-hsing; Tsai Chia-hsin; Chinese Taipei	Shen Ye; Zhang Wei; China
(Thailand) 2007 Bangkok	Phattapol Ngensrisuk; Sudket Prapakamol; Thailand	Hsieh Yu-hsing; Tsai Chia-hsin; Chinese Taipei	Songphon Anugritayawon; Nuttaphon Narkhtong; Thailand
(China) 2011 Shenzhen	Bodin Isara; Maneepong Jongjit; Thailand	Fang Chieh-min; Lee Sheng-mu; Chinese Taipei	Yohanes Rendy Sugiarto; Afiat Yuris Wirawan; Indonesia
(China) 2011 Shenzhen	Bodin Isara; Maneepong Jongjit; Thailand	Fang Chieh-min; Lee Sheng-mu; Chinese Taipei	Liao Min-chun; Wu Chun-wei; Chinese Taipei
(Russia) 2013 Kazan	Ko Sung-hyun; Lee Yong-dae; South Korea	Vladimir Ivanov; Ivan Sozonov; Russia	Hong Ji-hoon; Kim Gi-jung; South Korea
(Russia) 2013 Kazan	Ko Sung-hyun; Lee Yong-dae; South Korea	Vladimir Ivanov; Ivan Sozonov; Russia	Loh Wei Sheng; Jagdish Singh; Malaysia
(South Korea) 2015 Gwangju	Kim Gi-jung; Kim Sa-rang; South Korea	Wang Yilyu; Zhang Wen; China	Mohamad Arif Abdul Latif; Low Juan Shen; Malaysia
(South Korea) 2015 Gwangju	Kim Gi-jung; Kim Sa-rang; South Korea	Wang Yilyu; Zhang Wen; China	Bodin Isara; Nipitphon Phuangphuapet; Thailand
(Taiwan) 2017 Taipei	Kim Jae-hwan; Seo Seung-jae; South Korea	Kenya Mitsuhashi; Katsuki Tamate; Japan	Vincent Phuah; Jagdish Singh; Malaysia
(Taiwan) 2017 Taipei	Kim Jae-hwan; Seo Seung-jae; South Korea	Kenya Mitsuhashi; Katsuki Tamate; Japan	Lee Jhe-huei; Lee Yang; Chinese Taipei
(China) 2021 Chengdu	Ren Xiangyu; Tan Qiang; China	He Jiting; Zhou Haodong; China	Liew Xun; Wong Tien Ci; Malaysia
(China) 2021 Chengdu	Ren Xiangyu; Tan Qiang; China	He Jiting; Zhou Haodong; China	Lee Fang-chih; Po Li-wei; Chinese Taipei
(Germany) 2025 Rhine-Ruhr	Jin Yong; Lee Jong-min; South Korea	Cui Hechen; Peng Jianqin; China	Liao Pinyi; Zhang Lejian; China
(Germany) 2025 Rhine-Ruhr	Jin Yong; Lee Jong-min; South Korea	Cui Hechen; Peng Jianqin; China	Peeratchai Sukphun; Pakkapon Teeraratsakul; Thailand

=== Women's doubles ===
Event	Gold	Silver	Bronze
(Thailand) 2007 Bangkok	Cheng Wen-hsing; Chien Yu-chin; Chinese Taipei	Pan Pan; Tian Qing; China	Wang Lin; Zhang Dan; China
(Thailand) 2007 Bangkok	Cheng Wen-hsing; Chien Yu-chin; Chinese Taipei	Pan Pan; Tian Qing; China	Duanganong Aroonkesorn; Kunchala Voravichitchaikul; Thailand
(China) 2011 Shenzhen	Eom Hye-won; Chang Ye-na; South Korea	Cheng Shao-chieh; Pai Hsiao-ma; Chinese Taipei	Savitree Amitrapai; Nessara Somsri; Thailand
(China) 2011 Shenzhen	Eom Hye-won; Chang Ye-na; South Korea	Cheng Shao-chieh; Pai Hsiao-ma; Chinese Taipei	Hsieh Pei-chen; Wang Pei-rong; Chinese Taipei
(Russia) 2013 Kazan	Chahng Ye-na; Kim So-yeong; South Korea	Luo Yu; Tian Qing; China	Lee So-hee; Shin Seung-chan; South Korea
(Russia) 2013 Kazan	Chahng Ye-na; Kim So-yeong; South Korea	Luo Yu; Tian Qing; China	Chow Mei Kuan; Lee Meng Yean; Malaysia
(South Korea) 2015 Gwangju	Lee So-hee; Shin Seung-chan; South Korea	Go Ah-ra; Yoo Chae-won; South Korea	Miki Kashihara; Miyuki Kato; Japan
(South Korea) 2015 Gwangju	Lee So-hee; Shin Seung-chan; South Korea	Go Ah-ra; Yoo Chae-won; South Korea	Hsu Ya-ching; Pai Yu-po; Chinese Taipei
(Taiwan) 2017 Taipei	Hsu Ya-ching; Wu Ti-jung; Chinese Taipei	Chayanit Chaladchalam; Phataimas Muenwong; Thailand	Miki Kashihara; Miyuki Kato; Japan
(Taiwan) 2017 Taipei	Hsu Ya-ching; Wu Ti-jung; Chinese Taipei	Chayanit Chaladchalam; Phataimas Muenwong; Thailand	Annie Xu; Kerry Xu; United States
(China) 2021 Chengdu	Li Wenmei; Liu Xuanxuan; China	Du Yue; Xia Yuting; China	Chasinee Korepap; Jhenicha Sudjaipraparat; Thailand
(China) 2021 Chengdu	Li Wenmei; Liu Xuanxuan; China	Du Yue; Xia Yuting; China	Moe Aoki; Machi Nagasako; Japan
(Germany) 2025 Rhine-Ruhr	Li Qian; Wang Yiduo; China	Jheng Yu-chieh; Sung Yu-hsuan; Chinese Taipei	Liu Jiayue; Tang Ruizhi; China
(Germany) 2025 Rhine-Ruhr	Li Qian; Wang Yiduo; China	Jheng Yu-chieh; Sung Yu-hsuan; Chinese Taipei	Sumire Nakade; Yumi Tanabe; Japan

=== Mixed doubles ===
Event	Gold	Silver	Bronze
(Thailand) 2007 Bangkok	Yoo Yeon-seong; Kim Min-jung; South Korea	Fang Chieh-min; Cheng Wen-hsing; Chinese Taipei	Chen Hong; Zhang Dan; China
(Thailand) 2007 Bangkok	Yoo Yeon-seong; Kim Min-jung; South Korea	Fang Chieh-min; Cheng Wen-hsing; Chinese Taipei	Sudket Prapakamol; Salakjit Ponsana; Thailand
(China) 2011 Shenzhen	Shin Baek-cheol; Eom Hye-won; South Korea	Lee Sheng-mu; Hsieh Pei-chen; Chinese Taipei	Riky Widianto; Shendy Puspa Irawati; Indonesia
(China) 2011 Shenzhen	Shin Baek-cheol; Eom Hye-won; South Korea	Lee Sheng-mu; Hsieh Pei-chen; Chinese Taipei	Maneepong Jongjit; Savitree Amitrapai; Thailand
(Russia) 2013 Kazan	Kim Gi-jung; Kim So-yeong; South Korea	Liu Cheng; Tian Qing; China	Vladimir Ivanov; Nina Vislova; Russia
(Russia) 2013 Kazan	Kim Gi-jung; Kim So-yeong; South Korea	Liu Cheng; Tian Qing; China	Chen Hung-ling; Wang Pei-rong; Chinese Taipei
(South Korea) 2015 Gwangju	Kim Gi-jung; Shin Seung-chan; South Korea	Lu Ching-yao; Chiang Kai-hsin; Chinese Taipei	Kim Sa-rang; Go Ah-ra; South Korea
(South Korea) 2015 Gwangju	Kim Gi-jung; Shin Seung-chan; South Korea	Lu Ching-yao; Chiang Kai-hsin; Chinese Taipei	Tseng Min-hao; Hsieh Pei-chen; Chinese Taipei
(Taiwan) 2017 Taipei	Wang Chi-lin; Lee Chia-hsin; Chinese Taipei	Nur Mohd Azriyn Ayub; Goh Yea Ching; Malaysia	Rodion Alimov; Alina Davletova; Russia
(Taiwan) 2017 Taipei	Wang Chi-lin; Lee Chia-hsin; Chinese Taipei	Nur Mohd Azriyn Ayub; Goh Yea Ching; Malaysia	Lee Yang; Hsu Ya-ching; Chinese Taipei
(China) 2021 Chengdu	Ye Hong-wei; Lee Chia-hsin; Chinese Taipei	Lee Fang-chih; Teng Chun-hsun; Chinese Taipei	Ji Young-bin; Jin Yong; South Korea
(China) 2021 Chengdu	Ye Hong-wei; Lee Chia-hsin; Chinese Taipei	Lee Fang-chih; Teng Chun-hsun; Chinese Taipei	Yuto Takiguchi; Rio Uemura; Japan
(Germany) 2025 Rhine-Ruhr	Wu Hsuan-yi; Yang Chu-yun; Chinese Taipei	Chen Cheng-kuan; Hsu Yin-hui; Chinese Taipei	Liao Pinyi; Li Qian; China
(Germany) 2025 Rhine-Ruhr	Wu Hsuan-yi; Yang Chu-yun; Chinese Taipei	Chen Cheng-kuan; Hsu Yin-hui; Chinese Taipei	Lin Yu-chieh; Jheng Yu-chieh; Chinese Taipei

=== Mixed teams ===
Edition	Final			Semi-finalists	
Edition	Champions	Score	Runners-up	Semi-finalists	
(Thailand) 2007 Bangkok	Thailand	3–2	China	Indonesia	Chinese Taipei
(China) 2011 Shenzhen	Indonesia	3–1	China	Thailand	Chinese Taipei
(Russia) 2013 Kazan	South Korea	3–0	China	Thailand	Chinese Taipei
(South Korea) 2015 Gwangju	South Korea	3–0	China	Thailand	Malaysia
(Taiwan) 2017 Taipei	Chinese Taipei	3–0	Japan	Malaysia	Thailand
(China) 2021 Chengdu	Chinese Taipei	3–2	China	Thailand	Malaysia
(Germany) 2025 Rhine-Ruhr	China	3–1	Chinese Taipei	South Korea	India
