= Shendy Puspa Irawati =

Indonesian badminton player

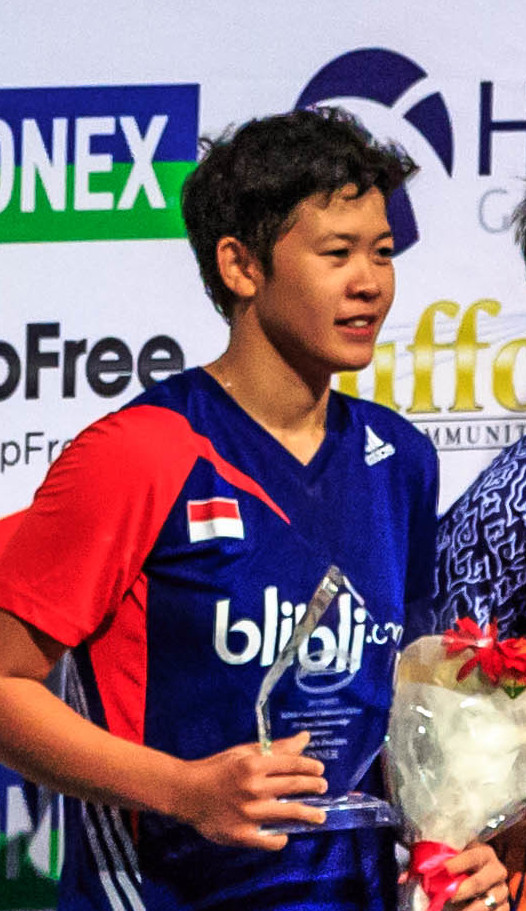

Personal information
- Born: Shendy Puspa Irawati; 20 May 1987 (age 39) Nganjuk, East Java, Indonesia
- Height: 1.76 m (5 ft 9 in)

Sport
- Country: Indonesia
- Sport: Badminton
- Handedness: Right

Women's & mixed doubles
- Highest ranking: 8 (WD with Meiliana Jauhari 14 January 2010); 9 (XD with Fran Kurniawan 6 June 2013)
- BWF profile
Medal record
Women's badminton
Representing Indonesia
Sudirman Cup
Bronze medal – third place	2009 Guangzhou	Mixed team
Uber Cup
Bronze medal – third place	2010 Kuala Lumpur	Women's team
Asian Games
Bronze medal – third place	2010 Guangzhou	Women's team
Asian Championships
Bronze medal – third place	2013 Taipei	Mixed doubles
SEA Games
Silver medal – second place	2009 Vientiane	Women's team
Bronze medal – third place	2009 Vientiane	Women's doubles
Summer Universiade
Gold medal – first place	2011 Shenzhen	Mixed team
Bronze medal – third place	2011 Shenzhen	Mixed doubles

Shendy Puspa Irawati (born 20 May 1987) is an Indonesian badminton player from PB Djarum club. She won the bronze medals at the 2009 SEA Games, 2011 Summer Universiade, and at the 2013 Asian Championships.

== Career ==
Irawati competed women's doubles in BWF Super Series at the 2008 Indonesia Super Series, 2009 Malaysia Super Series, and 2009 Korea Open Super Series with her partner, Meiliana Jauhari. Their best result were in the Indonesia and Malaysia where they became to the semi-finalists. In Indonesia, they were lost from Japanese Miyuki Maeda and Satoko Suetsuna, and in Malaysia, they were lost from the Chinese Yang Wei and Zhang Jiewen with 10–21, 15–21.

At the National Championships, she was the mixed doubles runner-up in 2012. At the same year, she also won the bronze medal at the National Sports Week (PON) in the women's doubles and team. Her best achievement is to win the 2014 U.S. Open and Indonesia Masters Grand Prix Gold tournament.

== Personal life ==
She is from PB Djarum. Her hobbies are listening to music, playing guitar and watching cinema. Generally people called her just Shendy. Her father is Aripin, her mother is Nanik.

== Achievements ==
=== Asian Championships ===
Mixed doubles
Year	Venue	Partner	Opponent	Score	Result
2013	Taipei Arena, Taipei, Taiwan	(Indonesia) Fran Kurniawan	(South Korea) Ko Sung-hyun (South Korea) Kim Ha-na	21–23, 15–21	Bronze

=== SEA Games ===
Women's doubles
Year	Venue	Partner	Opponent	Score	Result
2009	Gym Hall 1, National Sports Complex, Vientiane, Laos	(Indonesia) Meiliana Jauhari	(Malaysia) Chin Eei Hui (Malaysia) Wong Pei Tty	12–21, 15–21	Bronze

=== Summer Universiade ===
Mixed doubles
Year	Venue	Partner	Opponent	Score	Result
2011	Gymnasium of SZIIT, Shenzhen, China	(Indonesia) Riky Widianto	(Chinese Taipei) Lee Sheng-mu (Chinese Taipei) Hsieh Pei-chen	24–22, 16–21, 17–21	Bronze

=== BWF Grand Prix (5 titles, 8 runners-up) ===
The BWF Grand Prix had two levels, the Grand Prix and Grand Prix Gold. It was a series of badminton tournaments sanctioned by the Badminton World Federation (BWF) and played between 2007 and 2017.

Women's doubles
Year	Tournament	Partner	Opponent	Score	Result
2007	New Zealand Open	(Indonesia) Meiliana Jauhari	(Japan) Ikue Tatani (Japan) Aya Wakisaka	17–21, 21–15, 16–21	(silver) Runner-up
2008	Bitburger Open	(Indonesia) Meiliana Jauhari	(Denmark) Helle Nielsen (Denmark) Marie Røpke	15–21, 18–21	(silver) Runner-up
2008	Bulgarian Open	(Indonesia) Meiliana Jauhari	(India) Jwala Gutta (India) Shruti Kurian	11–21, 19–21	(silver) Runner-up
2008	Dutch Open	(Indonesia) Meiliana Jauhari	(Denmark) Lena Frier Kristiansen (Denmark) Kamilla Rytter Juhl	16–21, 23–25	(silver) Runner-up
2008	Vietnam Open	(Indonesia) Meiliana Jauhari	(Singapore) Shinta Mulia Sari (Singapore) Yao Lei	21–16, 19–21, 21–11	(gold) Winner
2009	Philippines Open	(Indonesia) Meiliana Jauhari	(China) Gao Ling (China) Wei Yili	11–21, 11–21	(silver) Runner-up
2014	U.S. Open	(Indonesia) Vita Marissa	(Thailand) Puttita Supajirakul (Thailand) Sapsiree Taerattanachai	21–15, 21–10	(gold) Winner
2014	Indonesian Masters	(Indonesia) Vita Marissa	(Indonesia) Keshya Nurvita Hanadia (Indonesia) Devi Tika Permatasari	23–21, 21–13	(gold) Winner
2014	Dutch Open	(Indonesia) Vita Marissa	(Netherlands) Eefje Muskens (Netherlands) Selena Piek	8–11, 11–4, 9–11, 10–11	(silver) Runner-up

Mixed doubles
Year	Tournament	Partner	Opponent	Score	Result
2008	Bulgarian Open	(Indonesia) Fran Kurniawan	(India) Valiyaveetil Diju (India) Jwala Gutta	21–15, 18–21, 19–21	(silver) Runner-up
2008	Dutch Open	(Indonesia) Fran Kurniawan	(Denmark) Joachim Fischer Nielsen (Denmark) Christinna Pedersen	17–21, 9–21	(silver) Runner-up
2008	Vietnam Open	(Indonesia) Tontowi Ahmad	(Singapore) Riky Widianto (Singapore) Vanessa Neo	21–17, 21–9	(gold) Winner
2012	India Grand Prix Gold	(Indonesia) Fran Kurniawan	(Thailand) Nipitphon Puangpuapech (Thailand) Savitree Amitrapai	21–12, 24–22	(gold) Winner

BWF Grand Prix Gold tournament
BWF Grand Prix tournament

=== BWF International Challenge/Series (11 titles, 3 runners-up) ===
Women's doubles
Year	Tournament	Partner	Opponent	Score	Result
2006	Cheers Asian Satellite	(Indonesia) Devi Tika Permatasari	(Indonesia) Nitya Krishinda Maheswari (Indonesia) Nadya Melati	21–15, 17–21, 17–21	(silver) Runner-up
2007	Bahrain Satellite	(Indonesia) Meiliana Jauhari	(Malaysia) Chor Hooi Yee (Malaysia) Wong Wai See	21–13, 21–14	(gold) Winner
2007	Indonesia International	(Indonesia) Meiliana Jauhari	(Japan) Yasuyo Imabeppu (Japan) Shizuka Matsuo	15–21, 21–15, 21–17	(gold) Winner
2008	Polish Open	(Indonesia) Meiliana Jauhari	(Sweden) Elin Bergblom (Sweden) Johanna Persson	21–11, 21–19	(gold) Winner
2008	Spanish Open	(Indonesia) Meiliana Jauhari	(Scotland) Jillie Cooper (Belgium) Nathalie Descamps	21–10, 21–10	(gold) Winner
2008	Le Volant d'Or de Toulouse	(Indonesia) Meiliana Jauhari	(Netherlands) Rachel van Cutsen (Netherlands) Paulien van Dooremalen	21–15, 21–10	(gold) Winner
2008	Indonesia International	(Indonesia) Meiliana Jauhari	(Singapore) Shinta Mulia Sari (Singapore) Yao Lei	21–14, 21–18	(gold) Winner
2014	Indonesia International	(Indonesia) Vita Marissa	(Indonesia) Suci Rizky Andini (Indonesia) Tiara Rosalia Nuraidah	6–11, 9–11, 6–11	(silver) Runner-up

Mixed doubles
Year	Tournament	Partner	Opponent	Score	Result
2008	Polish International	(Indonesia) Fran Kurniawan	(Poland) Robert Mateusiak (Poland) Nadieżda Zięba	14–21, 13–21	(silver) Runner-up
2008	Finnish International	(Indonesia) Fran Kurniawan	(Denmark) Mads Pieler Kolding (Denmark) Line Damkjær Kruse	21–12, 21–18	(gold) Winner
2008	Le Volant d'Or de Toulouse	(Indonesia) Fran Kurniawan	(Indonesia) Rendra Wijaya (Indonesia) Meiliana Jauhari	21–18, 18–21, 21–14	(gold) Winner
2008	Indonesia International	(Indonesia) Fran Kurniawan	(Singapore) Chayut Triyachart (Singapore) Yao Lei	21–19, 21–13	(gold) Winner
2011	Tata Open India International	(Indonesia) Fran Kurniawan	(Indonesia) Riky Widianto (Indonesia) Richi Puspita Dili	21–15, 21–15	(gold) Winner
2013	Malaysia International	(Indonesia) Alfian Eko Prasetya	(Chinese Taipei) Wang Chi-lin (Chinese Taipei) Wu Ti-jung	21–15, 21–16	(gold) Winner

BWF International Challenge tournament
BWF International Series tournament

== Performance timeline ==
Key

W	Won	F	Finalist	SF	Semi-finalist
QF	Quarter-finalist	#R	Rounds 4, 3, 2, 1	RR	Round-robin stage
Q#	Qualification round	A	Absent	w/d	Withdrew
G	Gold	S	Silver	B	Bronze
NH	Not held	N/A	Not applicable	DNQ	Did not qualify

=== National team ===
- Senior level

Team Events	2009	2010	2011
SEA Games	S	NH	A
Asian Games	NH	B	NH
Universiade	NH		G
Uber Cup	NH	B	NH

=== Individual competitions ===
- Senior level

Events	2009	2010	2011	2012	2013	2014	2015
SEA Games	B (WD)	NH	A	NH	A	NH	A
Universiade	NH		B (XD)	NH	A	NH	A
Asian Championships	A	2R (WD)	1R (XD)	2R (XD)	B (XD)	A	
Asian Games	NH	2R (WD)	NH			A	NH
World Championships	3R (WD)	A		NH	2R (XD)	A	2R (WD)

Tournament	2007	2008	2009	2010	2011	2012	2013	2014	2015	Best
BWF Superseries
Indonesia Open	Q1 (WD)	SF (WD); QF (XD)	w/d	2R (WD)	A	2R (XD)	2R (XD)	2R (WD); Q2 (XD)	Q1 (XD)	SF (2008)
All England Open	A		1R (WD)	2R (WD)	A		QF (XD)	A		QF (2013)
Swiss Open	A		QF (WD)	A	N/A					QF (2009)
India Open	NH	N/A			A	2R (XD)	QF (XD)	A		QF (2013)
Malaysia Open	A	Q1 (WD)	SF (WD); 1R (XD)	2R (WD)	A	Q2 (XD)	A			SF (2009)
Singapore Open	A		w/d	QF (WD)	A	QF (XD)	1R (XD)	2R (WD); 1R (XD)	A	QF (2010 (WD), 2012 (XD))
Japan Open	A		QF (WD)	1R (WD)	A			1R (WD); Q2 (XD)	A	QF (2009)
Korea Open	A		QF (WD); QF (XD)	A		Q1 (XD)	A			QF (2009 (WD, XD))
China Masters	A			1R (WD)	A			N/A		1R (2010)
Denmark Open	1R (WD)	A	QF (WD)	A		QF (XD)	A	1R (WD)	A	QF (2009 (WD), 2012 (XD))
French Open	A		2R (WD)	A				2R (WD)	A	2R (2009, 2014)
China Open	A					1R (XD)	A			1R (2012)
Hong Kong Open	A			w/d	A	QF (XD)	A	1R (WD)	A	QF (2012)

Tournament	2007	2008	2009	2010	2011	2012	2013	2014	2015	Best
BWF Grand Prix and Grand Prix Gold
Malaysia Masters	NH		A		2R (XD)	A		2R (XD)	2R (WD)	2R (2011, 2014, 2015)
Syed Modi International	NH		A	QF (XD)	SF (XD)	W (XD)	NH	A		W (2012)
German Open	2R (WD)	A					QF (XD)	A		QF (2013)
Australian Open	N/A		A			1R (XD)	A	N/A		1R (2012)
New Zealand Open	F (WD)	A		NH	N/A	NH	A			F (2007)
U.S. Open	A							W (WD)	A	W (2014)
Chinese Taipei Open	A			w/d	A		QF (XD)	A		QF (2013)
Vietnam Open	QF (WD); QF (XD)	F (WD); W (XD)	A	SF (WD)	QF (XD)	SF (XD)	w/d	2R (WD); SF (XD)	1R (XD)	W (2008)
Thailand Open	A	QF (WD); 1R (XD)	A	NH	1R (XD)	QF (XD)	A	NH	A	QF (2008 (WD), 2012 (XD))
Philippines Open	2R (WD)	NH	F (WD)	NH						F (2009)
Dutch Open	2R (WD)	F (WD); F (XD)	A					F (WD); R2 (XD)	A	F (2008 (WD, XD), 2014 (WD))
Bitburger Open	A	F (WD); QF (XD)	A							F (2008)
Bulgaria Open	NH	F (WD); F (XD)	NH			N/A				F (2008 (WD, XD))
Korea Masters	N/A			A	QF (XD)	A				QF (2011)
Macau Open	A				1R (XD)	A				1R (2011)
Indonesian Masters	NH			2R (WD)	1R (XD)	2R (XD)	2R (XD)	W (WD); QF (XD)	A	W (2014)
