= Afiat Yuris Wirawan =

Indonesian badminton player (born 1989)

Personal information
- Born: 17 April 1989 (age 37) Boyolali, Central Java, Indonesia
- Height: 1.74 m (5 ft 9 in)

Sport
- Country: Indonesia
- Sport: Badminton
- Handedness: Right

Men's & mixed doubles
- Highest ranking: 34 (MD 22 October 2010); 53 (XD 27 November 2014)
- BWF profile
Medal record
Men's badminton
Representing Indonesia
Summer Universiade
Gold medal – first place	2011 Shenzhen	Mixed team
Bronze medal – third place	2011 Shenzhen	Men's doubles
World Junior Championships
Bronze medal – third place	2007 Waitakere City	Mixed doubles
Asian Junior Championships
Bronze medal – third place	2007 Kuala Lumpur	Mixed team

Afiat Yuris Wirawan (born 17 April 1989) is an Indonesian badminton player.

== Career ==
In 2006, Wirawan competed at the BWF World Junior Championships in the boys' doubles event but lost to the Vietnamese paired in first round. He became the champion of the Brazil International tournament in the men's doubles event partnered with Danny Bawa Chrisnanta and in the mixed doubles event partnered with Purwati. In 2007, he won a bronze medal at the BWF World Junior Championships in the mixed doubles event partnered with Debby Susanto after being defeated by Lim Khim Wah and Ng Hui Lin of Malaysia in the semifinal round. He won the Waikato International tournament in the men's doubles event partnered with Wifqi Windarto after beating Ashton Chen and Khoo Kian Teck of Singapore with the score 21–14, 21–15.

In 2008, Wirawan won the Laos Future Series tournament in the men's doubles event partnered with Windarto. He became the runner-up at the Smiling Fish and Indonesia International tournaments in the men's doubles event. At Smiling Fish, they were defeated by Fernando Kurniawan and Lingga Lie. At Indonesia, they were defeated by their compatriots Fran Kurniawan and Rendra Wijaya in the final match. He also became the semifinalist at the Vietnam Grand Prix tournament in the men's doubles event after being defeated by Fran Kurniawan and Rendra Wijaya with the score 19–21, 21–6, 21–14. In 2009, he became the semifinalist at the Vietnam International and Macau Open Grand Prix Gold tournaments in the men's doubles event. At Macau, they were defeated by Choong Tan Fook and Lee Wan Wah of Malaysia with the score 21–13, 21–15.

In 2010, Wirawan became the semifinalist at the India Open Grand Prix Gold tournament in the men's doubles event partnered with Yohanes Rendy Sugiarto after being defeated by K. T. Rupesh Kumar and Sanave Thomas in rubber game 21–9, 18–21, 24–22. In 2011, he won a gold medal in the mixed team event and a bronze medal in the men's doubles event at the Summer Universiade games held in Shenzhen, China. He also became the semifinalist of the Indonesian Masters Grand Prix Gold tournament in the men's doubles event after being defeated by Hiroyuki Endo and Kenichi Hayakawa of Japan in straight games 21–16, 21–18. In 2012, he became the runner-up of the Vietnam Open Grand Prix tournament in the men's doubles event partnered with Sugiarto. In the final match, they were defeated by Bodin Isara and Maneepong Jongjit of Thailand with the score 19–21, 21–16, 21–11.

In 2014, Wirawan won the Bahrain International Challenge tournament in the men's doubles event partnered with Sugiarto. They beat another Indonesian pair, Fran Kurniawan and Agripinna Prima Rahmanto Putra, with the score 23–21, 21–15. He also won the USM Indonesia International tournament partnered with Sugiarto after defeating Kusdianto Seiko Wahyu and Tedi Setiadi with the score 21–18, 21–17.

== Personal life ==
His hobbies are swimming, watching movies, and fishing.

== Achievements ==
=== Summer Universiade ===
Men's doubles
Year	Venue	Partner	Opponent	Score	Result
2011	Gymnasium of SZIIT; Shenzhen, China	(Indonesia) Yohanes Rendy Sugiarto	(Chinese Taipei) Fang Chieh-min (Chinese Taipei) Lee Sheng-mu	18–21, 15–21	Bronze

=== BWF World Junior Championships ===
Mixed doubles
Year	Venue	Partner	Opponent	Score	Result
2007	Waitakere Trusts Stadium; Waitakere City, New Zealand	(Indonesia) Debby Susanto	(Malaysia) Lim Khim Wah (Malaysia) Ng Hui Lin	16–21, 8–21	Bronze

=== BWF Grand Prix ===
The BWF Grand Prix had two levels, the Grand Prix and Grand Prix Gold. It was a series of badminton tournaments sanctioned by the Badminton World Federation (BWF) and played between 2007 and 2017.

Men's doubles
Year	Tournament	Partner	Opponent	Score	Result
2012	Vietnam Open	(Indonesia) Yohanes Rendy Sugiarto	(Thailand) Bodin Isara (Thailand) Maneepong Jongjit	21–19, 16–21, 11–21	(silver) Runner-up

BWF Grand Prix Gold tournament
BWF Grand Prix tournament

=== BWF International Challenge/Series ===
Men's doubles
Year	Tournament	Partner	Opponent	Score	Result
2006	Brazil International	(Indonesia) Danny Bawa Chrisnanta	(Brazil) Guilherme Pardo (Brazil) Guilherme Kumasaka	21–15, 21–15	(gold) Winner
2007	Waikato International	(Indonesia) Wifqi Windarto	(Singapore) Ashton Chen (Singapore) Khoo Kian Teck	21–14, 21–15	(gold) Winner
2008	Laos International	(Indonesia) Wifqi Windarto	(Indonesia) Rizki Yanu Kresnayandi (Indonesia) Albert Saputra	21–12, 21–8	(gold) Winner
2008	Smiling Fish International	(Indonesia) Wifqi Windarto	(Indonesia) Fernando Kurniawan (Indonesia) Lingga Lie	16–21, 15–21	(silver) Runner-up
2008	Indonesia International	(Indonesia) Wifqi Windarto	(Indonesia) Fran Kurniawan (Indonesia) Rendra Wijaya	18–21, 13–21	(silver) Runner-up
2014	USM Indonesia International	(Indonesia) Yohanes Rendy Sugiarto	(Indonesia) Seiko Wahyu Kusdianto (Indonesia) Tedi Supriadi	21–18, 21–17	(gold) Winner
2014	Bahrain International	(Indonesia) Yohanes Rendy Sugiarto	(Indonesia) Fran Kurniawan (Indonesia) Agripinna Prima Rahmanto Putra	23–21, 21–15	(gold) Winner

Mixed doubles
Year	Tournament	Partner	Opponent	Score	Result
2006	Brazil International	(Indonesia) Purwati	(Indonesia) Danny Bawa Chrisnanta (Indonesia) Meiliana Jauhari	Walkover	(gold) Winner

BWF International Challenge tournament
BWF International Series tournament
BWF Future Series tournament

=== BWF Junior International (1 runner-up) ===
Boys' doubles
Year	Tournament	Partner	Opponent	Score	Result	Ref.
2007	Dutch Junior	(Indonesia) Wifqi Windarto	(Indonesia) Fernando Kurniawan (Indonesia) Subakti	16–21, 18–21	(silver) Runner-up	

BWF Junior International Grand Prix tournament
BWF Junior International Challenge tournament
BWF Junior International Series tournament
BWF Junior Future Series tournament
