= Nipitphon Phuangphuapet =

Thai badminton player

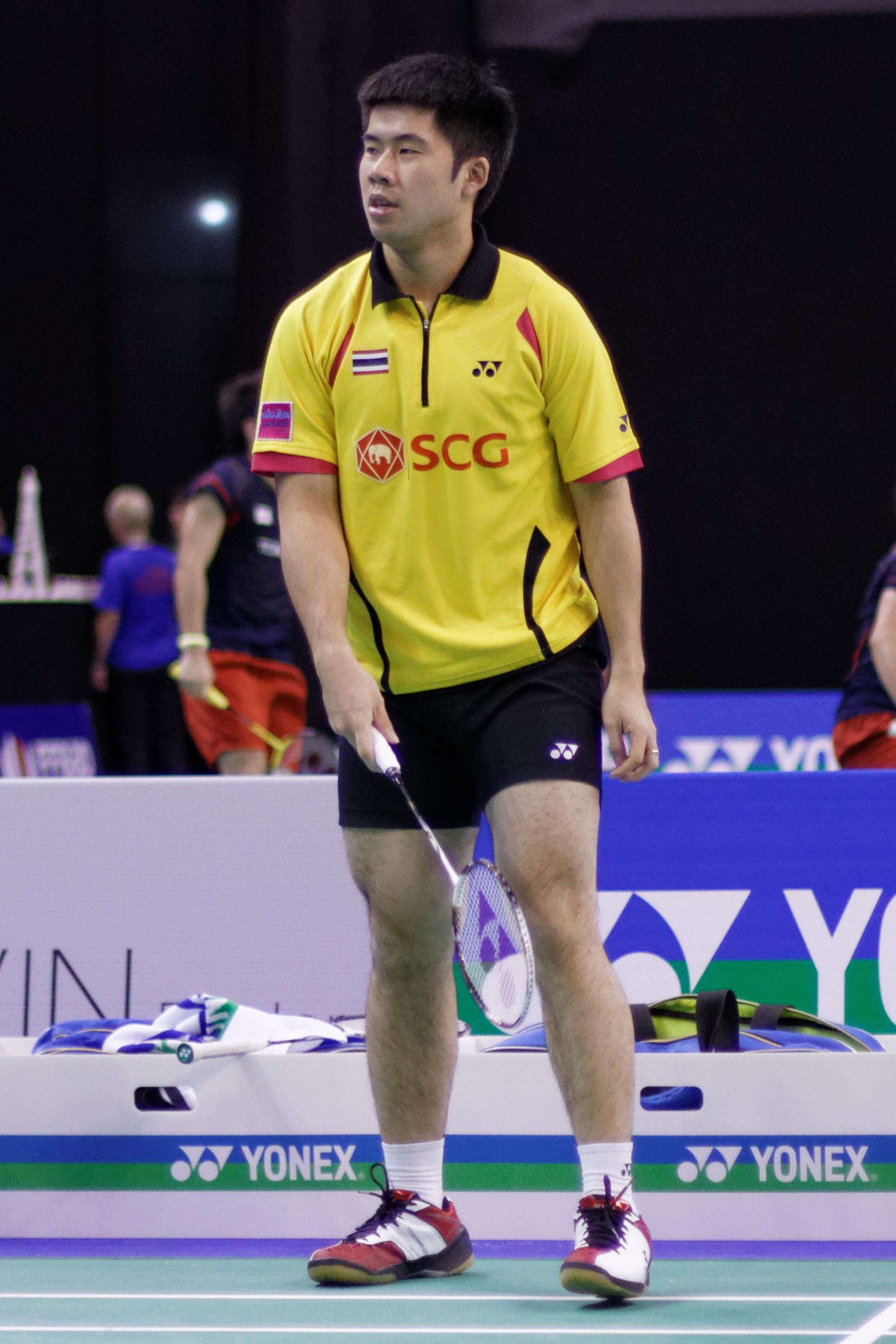
- Puangpuapech at the 2013 French Super Series

Personal information
- Born: 31 May 1991 (age 35) Bangkok, Thailand
- Height: 1.75 m (5 ft 9 in)
- Weight: 80 kg (176 lb)

Sport
- Country: Thailand
- Sport: Badminton
- Handedness: Right

Men's & mixed doubles
- Highest ranking: 11 (MD with Maneepong Jongjit 26 February 2015); 12 (MD with Bodin Isara 13 April 2017); 15 (XD with Savitree Amitrapai 30 April 2019)
- BWF profile
Medal record
Men's badminton
Representing Thailand
Sudirman Cup
Bronze medal – third place	2013 Kuala Lumpur	Mixed team
Bronze medal – third place	2017 Gold Coast	Mixed team
Bronze medal – third place	2019 Nanning	Mixed team
Asian Championships
Bronze medal – third place	2014 Gimcheon	Men's doubles
Asia Mixed Team Championships
Bronze medal – third place	2017 Ho Chi Minh	Mixed team
SEA Games
Silver medal – second place	2015 Singapore	Men's team
Bronze medal – third place	2011 Jakarta–Palembang	Men's doubles
Bronze medal – third place	2011 Jakarta–Palembang	Men's team
Bronze medal – third place	2013 Naypyidaw	Mixed doubles
Bronze medal – third place	2017 Kuala Lumpur	Men's doubles
Bronze medal – third place	2017 Kuala Lumpur	Men's team
Bronze medal – third place	2019 Philippines	Men's team
Summer Universiade
Bronze medal – third place	2015 Gwangju	Men's doubles
Bronze medal – third place	2015 Gwangju	Mixed team
World Junior Championships
Bronze medal – third place	2009 Alor Setar	Boys' doubles
Bronze medal – third place	2009 Alor Setar	Mixed team
Asian Junior Championships
Bronze medal – third place	2009 Kuala Lumpur	Boys' doubles
Bronze medal – third place	2009 Kuala Lumpur	Mixed team

Nipitphon Phuangphuapet (Thai: นิพิฐพนธ์ พวงพั่วเพชร; RTGS: Niphitphon Phuangphuaphet, born 31 May 1991) is a Thai badminton player. He studies bachelor of Laws at Bangkok-Dhonburi University.

== Achievements ==
=== Asian Championships ===
Men's doubles
Year	Venue	Partner	Opponent	Score	Result
2014	Gimcheon Indoor Stadium; Gimcheon, South Korea	(Thailand) Maneepong Jongjit	(South Korea) Shin Baek-cheol (South Korea) Yoo Yeon-seong	17–21, 20–22	Bronze

=== SEA Games ===
Men's doubles
Year	Venue	Partner	Opponent	Score	Result
2011	Istora Senayan; Jakarta, Indonesia	(Thailand) Patipat Chalardchaleam	(Indonesia) Mohammad Ahsan (Indonesia) Bona Septano	12–21, 16–21	Bronze
2017	Axiata Arena; Kuala Lumpur, Malaysia	(Thailand) Bodin Isara	(Malaysia) Ong Yew Sin (Malaysia) Teo Ee Yi	12–21, 15–21	Bronze

Mixed doubles
Year	Venue	Partner	Opponent	Score	Result
2013	Wunna Theikdi Indoor Stadium; Naypyidaw, Myanmar	(Thailand) Puttita Supajirakul	(Indonesia) Muhammad Rijal (Indonesia) Debby Susanto	11–21, 21–18, 19–21	Bronze

=== Summer Universiade ===
Men's doubles
Year	Venue	Partner	Opponent	Score	Result
2015	Hwasun Hanium Culture Sports Center; Hwasun, South Korea	(Thailand) Bodin Isara	(South Korea) Kim Gi-jung (South Korea) Kim Sa-rang	13–21, 11–21	Bronze

=== World Junior Championships ===
Boys' doubles
Year	Venue	Partner	Opponent	Score	Result
2009	Stadium Sultan Abdul Halim; Alor Setar, Malaysia	(Thailand) Tin Caballes	(Indonesia) Berry Angriawan (Indonesia) Muhammad Ulinnuha	19–21, 15–21	Bronze

=== Asian Junior Championships ===
Boys' doubles
Year	Venue	Partner	Opponent	Score	Result
2009	Stadium Juara; Kuala Lumpur, Malaysia	(Thailand) Tin Caballes	(Indonesia) Angga Pratama (Indonesia) Yohanes Rendy Sugiarto	18–21, 8–21	Bronze

=== BWF World Tour (1 title, 1 runner-up) ===
The BWF World Tour, which was announced on 19 March 2017 and implemented in 2018, is a series of elite badminton tournaments sanctioned by the Badminton World Federation (BWF). The BWF World Tour is divided into levels of World Tour Finals, Super 1000, Super 750, Super 500, Super 300 (part of the HSBC World Tour), and the BWF Tour Super 100.

Mixed doubles
Year	Tournament	Level	Partner	Opponent	Score	Result
2018	Vietnam Open	Super 100	(Thailand) Savitree Amitrapai	(Indonesia) Alfian Eko Prasetya (Indonesia) Marsheilla Gischa Islami	13–21, 21–18, 21–19	(gold) Winner
2018	Indonesia Masters	Super 100	(Thailand) Savitree Amitrapai	(Indonesia) Rinov Rivaldy (Indonesia) Pitha Haningtyas Mentari	19–21, 18–21	(silver) Runner-up

=== BWF Superseries (2 runners-up) ===
The BWF Superseries, which was launched on 14 December 2006 and implemented in 2007, was a series of elite badminton tournaments, sanctioned by the Badminton World Federation (BWF). BWF Superseries levels were Superseries and Superseries Premier. A season of Superseries consisted of twelve tournaments around the world that had been introduced since 2011. Successful players were invited to the Superseries Finals, which were held at the end of each year.

Men's doubles
Year	Tournament	Partner	Opponent	Score	Result
2016	Denmark Open	(Thailand) Bodin Isara	(Malaysia) Goh V Shem (Malaysia) Tan Wee Kiong	21–14, 20–22, 19–21	(silver) Runner-up
2016	French Open	(Thailand) Bodin Isara	(Denmark) Mathias Boe (Denmark) Carsten Mogensen	21–19, 19–21, 0–3 retired	(silver) Runner-up

BWF Super Series Finals tournament
BWF Super Series Premier tournament
BWF Super Series tournament

=== BWF Grand Prix (2 titles, 2 runners-up) ===
The BWF Grand Prix had two levels, the Grand Prix and Grand Prix Gold. It was a series of badminton tournaments sanctioned by the Badminton World Federation (BWF) and played between 2007 and 2017.

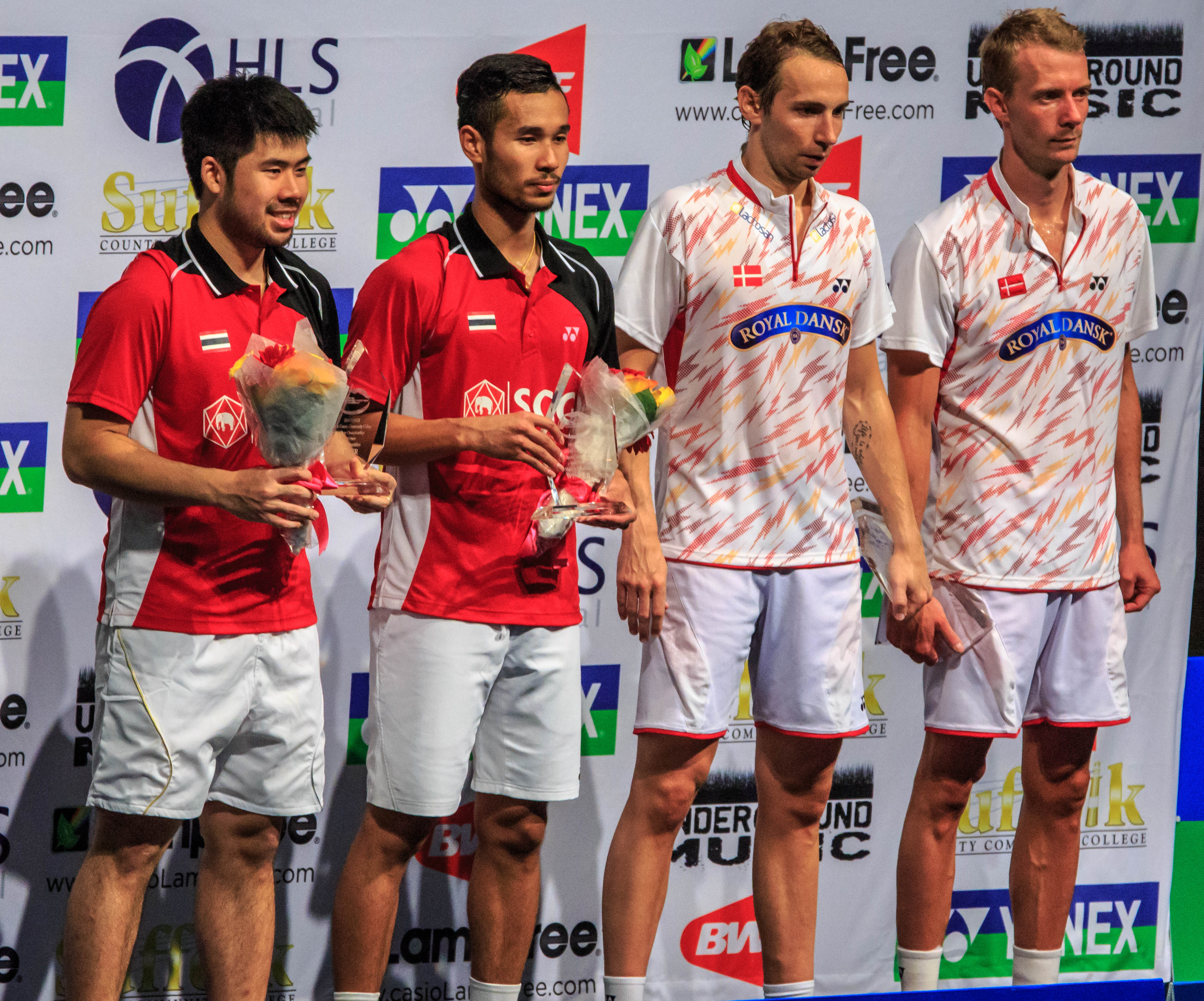
Phuangphuapet and Maneepong Jongjit as winner at the 2014 U.S. Open

Men's doubles
Year	Tournament	Partner	Opponent	Score	Result
2013	Canada Open	(Thailand) Maneepong Jongjit	(Thailand) Bodin Isara (Thailand) Pakkawat Vilailak	21–12, disqualified	(gold) Winner
2014	U.S. Open	(Thailand) Maneepong Jongjit	(Denmark) Mathias Boe (Denmark) Carsten Mogensen	21–17, 15–21, 21–18	(gold) Winner
2015	Mexico City Grand Prix	(Thailand) Bodin Isara	(India) Manu Attri (India) B. Sumeeth Reddy	20–22, 18–21	(silver) Runner-up

Mixed doubles
Year	Tournament	Partner	Opponent	Score	Result
2012	India Grand Prix Gold	(Thailand) Savitree Amitrapai	(Indonesia) Fran Kurniawan (Indonesia) Shendy Puspa Irawati	12–21, 22–24	(silver) Runner-up

BWF Grand Prix Gold tournament
BWF Grand Prix tournament

=== BWF International Challenge/Series (4 titles, 1 runner-up) ===
Men's doubles
Year	Tournament	Partner	Opponent	Score	Result
2010	Lao International	(Thailand) Patiphat Chalardchaleam	(Vietnam) Dương Bảo Đức (Vietnam) Phạm Cao Hiếu	21–15, 21–9	(gold) Winner
2011	Vietnam International	(Thailand) Patiphat Chalardchaleam	(Indonesia) Fernando Kurniawan (Indonesia) Wifqi Windarto	19–21, 21–14, 13–21	(silver) Runner-up
2015	Kharkiv International	(Thailand) Bodin Isara	(Poland) Adam Cwalina (Poland) Przemysław Wacha	21–18, 21–13	(gold) Winner
2015	Bahrain International	(Thailand) Bodin Isara	(Thailand) Wannawat Ampunsuwan (Thailand) Tinn Isriyanet	21–9, 21–14	(gold) Winner

Mixed doubles
Year	Tournament	Partner	Opponent	Score	Result
2018	Tata Open India International	(Thailand) Savitree Amitrapai	(Hong Kong) Chang Tak Ching (Hong Kong) Ng Wing Yung	21–13, 21–16	(gold) Winner

BWF International Challenge tournament
BWF International Series tournament
