= Savitree Amitrapai =

Thai badminton player (born 1988)

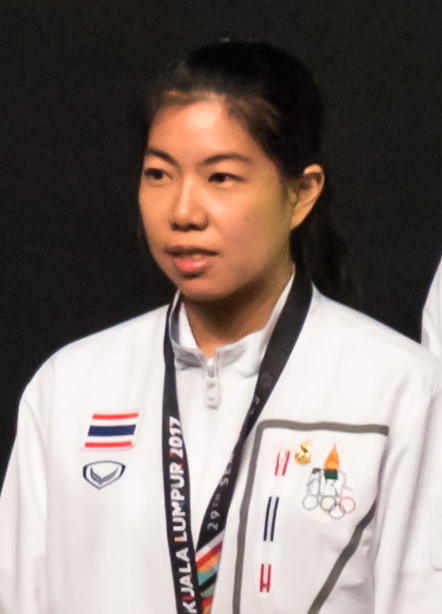
- Savitree at the 2017 SEA Games

Personal information
- Born: 19 November 1988 (age 37) Bangkok, Thailand
- Height: 1.63 m (5 ft 4 in)
- Weight: 57 kg (126 lb)

Sport
- Country: Thailand
- Sport: Badminton
- Handedness: Right

Women's & mixed doubles
- Highest ranking: 10 (WD 13 May 2010); 10 (XD 10 February 2017)
- BWF profile
Medal record
Women's badminton
Representing Thailand
Sudirman Cup
Bronze medal – third place	2017 Gold Coast	Mixed team
Bronze medal – third place	2019 Nanning	Mixed team
Uber Cup
Bronze medal – third place	2012 Wuhan	Women's team
Asian Games
Silver medal – second place	2010 Guangzhou	Women's team
Asian Championships
Bronze medal – third place	2010 New Delhi	Women's doubles
Asia Mixed Team Championships
Bronze medal – third place	2017 Ho Chi Minh	Mixed team
SEA Games
Gold medal – first place	2011 Jakarta–Palembang	Women's team
Gold medal – first place	2017 Kuala Lumpur	Women's team
Gold medal – first place	2019 Philippines	Women's team
Bronze medal – third place	2009 Vientiane	Women's doubles
Bronze medal – third place	2009 Vientiane	Women's team
Bronze medal – third place	2017 Kuala Lumpur	Mixed doubles
Summer Universiade
Gold medal – first place	2007 Bangkok	Mixed team
Bronze medal – third place	2011 Shenzhen	Women's doubles
Bronze medal – third place	2011 Shenzhen	Mixed doubles
Bronze medal – third place	2011 Shenzhen	Mixed team
Bronze medal – third place	2013 Kazan	Mixed team

Savitree Amitrapai (Thai: สาวิตรี อมิตรพ่าย; born 19 November 1988) is a Thai badminton player. She competed at the 2016 Summer Olympics in Rio de Janeiro, Brazil.

== Achievements ==
=== Asian Championships ===
Women's doubles
Year	Venue	Partner	Opponent	Score	Result
2010	Siri Fort Indoor Stadium; New Delhi, India	(Thailand) Vacharaporn Munkit	(Malaysia) Vivian Hoo (Malaysia) Woon Khe Wei	21–18, 17–21, 14–21	Bronze

=== SEA Games ===
Women's doubles
Year	Venue	Partner	Opponent	Score	Result
2009	National Sports Complex; Vientiane, Laos	(Thailand) Vacharaporn Munkit	(Singapore) Shinta Mulia Sari (Singapore) Yao Lei	20–22, 21–12, 19–21	Bronze

Mixed doubles
Year	Venue	Partner	Opponent	Score	Result
2017	Axiata Arena; Kuala Lumpur, Malaysia	(Thailand) Bodin Isara	(Malaysia) Goh Soon Huat (Malaysia) Shevon Jemie Lai	21–18, 24–26, 18–21	Bronze

=== Summer Universiade ===
Women's doubles
Year	Venue	Partner	Opponent	Score	Result
2011	Gymnasium of SZIIT; Shenzhen, China	(Thailand) Nessara Somsri	(South Korea) Jang Ye-na (South Korea) Eom Hye-won	14–21, 14–21	Bronze

Mixed doubles
Year	Venue	Partner	Opponent	Score	Result
2011	Gymnasium of SZIIT; Shenzhen, China	(Thailand) Maneepong Jongjit	(South Korea) Shin Baek-cheol (South Korea) Eom Hye-won	18–21, 21–17, 19–21	Bronze

=== BWF World Tour ===
The BWF World Tour, which was announced on 19 March 2017 and implemented in 2018, is a series of elite badminton tournaments sanctioned by the Badminton World Federation (BWF). The BWF World Tour is divided into levels of World Tour Finals, Super 1000, Super 750, Super 500, Super 300 (part of the HSBC World Tour), and the BWF Tour Super 100.

Mixed doubles
Year	Tournament	Level	Partner	Opponent	Score	Result
2018	Vietnam Open	Super 100	(Thailand) Nipitphon Phuangphuapet	(Indonesia) Alfian Eko Prasetya (Indonesia) Marsheilla Gischa Islami	13–21, 21–18, 21–19	(gold) Winner
2018	Indonesia Masters	Super 100	(Thailand) Nipitphon Phuangphuapet	(Indonesia) Rinov Rivaldy (Indonesia) Pitha Haningtyas Mentari	19–21, 18–21	(silver) Runner-up

=== BWF Grand Prix ===
The BWF Grand Prix had two levels, the Grand Prix and Grand Prix Gold. It was a series of badminton tournaments sanctioned by the Badminton World Federation (BWF) and played between 2007 and 2017.

Women's doubles
Year	Tournament	Partner	Opponent	Score	Result
2009	Vietnam Open	(Thailand) Vacharaporn Munkit	(Indonesia) Anneke Feinya Agustin (Indonesia) Annisa Wahyuni	14–21, 13–21	(silver) Runner-up
2012	India Grand Prix Gold	(Thailand) Sapsiree Taerattanachai	(Indonesia) Komala Dewi (Indonesia) Jenna Gozali	21–12, 21–6	(gold) Winner
2013	Australian Open	(Thailand) Sapsiree Taerattanachai	(Indonesia) Aprilsasi Putri Lejarsar Variella (Indonesia) Vita Marissa	19–21, 15–21	(silver) Runner-up

Mixed doubles
Year	Tournament	Partner	Opponent	Score	Result
2012	India Grand Prix Gold	(Thailand) Nipitphon Puangpuapech	(Indonesia) Fran Kurniawan (Indonesia) Shendy Puspa Irawati	12–21, 22–24	(silver) Runner-up
2016	Swiss Open	(Thailand) Bodin Isara	(China) Wang Yilyu (China) Chen Qingchen	21–19, 16–21, 15–21	(silver) Runner-up

BWF Grand Prix Gold tournament
BWF Grand Prix tournament

=== BWF International Challenge/Series ===
Women's doubles
Year	Tournament	Partner	Opponent	Score	Result
2010	Tata Open India International	(Thailand) Nessara Somsri	(Thailand) Nitchaon Jindapol (Thailand) Pattharaporn Jindapol	21–6, 21–18	(gold) Winner
2015	Bahrain International	(Thailand) Pacharapun Chochuwong	(Thailand) Chayanit Chaladchalam (Thailand) Phataimas Muenwong	21–6, 15–21, 21–16	(gold) Winner

Mixed doubles
Year	Tournament	Partner	Opponent	Score	Result
2007	Smiling Fish International	(Thailand) Thitipong Lapho	(Indonesia) Tontowi Ahmad (Indonesia) Yulianti	17–21, 21–17, 17–21	(silver) Runner-up
2009	Smiling Fish International	(Thailand) Patiphat Chalardchalaem	(Thailand) Thitipong Lapho (Thailand) Vacharaporn Munkit	21–10, 21–19	(gold) Winner
2010	Smiling Fish International	(Thailand) Patiphat Chalardchalaem	(Thailand) Maneepong Jongjit (Thailand) Rodjana Chuthabunditkul	21–19, 22–20	(gold) Winner
2010	Tata Open India International	(Thailand) Patiphat Chalardchalaem	(India) Arun Vishnu (India) Aparna Balan	21–10, 21–15	(gold) Winner
2011	Vietnam International	(Thailand) Patiphat Chalardchalaem	(South Korea) Kang Ji-wook (South Korea) Choi Hye-in	21–19, 20–22, 23–21	(gold) Winner
2015	Singapore International	(Thailand) Tinn Isriyanet	(Indonesia) Hafiz Faizal (Indonesia) Shella Devi Aulia	14–21, 17–21	(silver) Runner-up
2015	Swiss International	(Thailand) Bodin Isara	(Scotland) Robert Blair (Indonesia) Pia Zebadiah Bernadet	21–18, 23–25, 18–21	(silver) Runner-up
2015	Bahrain International	(Thailand) Bodin Isara	(Singapore) Danny Bawa Chrisnanta (Singapore) Vanessa Neo	21–17, 21–19	(gold) Winner
2015	Malaysia International	(Thailand) Bodin Isara	(Indonesia) Hafiz Faizal (Indonesia) Shella Devi Aulia	21–13, 21–6	(gold) Winner
2018	Tata Open India International	(Thailand) Nipitphon Phuangphuapet	(Hong Kong) Chang Tak Ching (Hong Kong) Ng Wing Yung	21–13, 21–16	(gold) Winner

BWF International Challenge tournament
BWF International Series tournament
