= Bahrain International Challenge =

Badminton tournament

Bahrain International Challenge is an open international badminton tournament in Bahrain established in 2008. This tournament presented by the Bahrain Badminton and Squash Federation, and sanctioned by Badminton World Federation and Badminton Asia. This tournament has been a BWF International Challenge level, and a part of Bahrain International Badminton Festival. Another tournament on Bahrain Festival is Bahrain International Series.

== Previous winners ==
Year	Men's singles	Women's singles	Men's doubles	Women's doubles	Mixed doubles
2008	(India) R. M. V. Gurusaidutt	(India) Trupti Murgunde	(India) Akshay Dewalkar (India) Jishnu Sanyal	(Canada) Charmaine Reid (Germany) Nicole Grether	(India) Arun Vishnu (India) Aparna Balan
2009	No competition				
2010	(Indonesia) Tommy Sugiarto	(Greece) Anne Hald Jensen	(India) Rupesh Kumar (India) Sanave Thomas	(Canada) Charmaine Reid (Germany) Nicole Grether	(Indonesia) Viki Indra Okvana (Indonesia) Gustiani Megawati
2011	(India) Sourabh Varma	(Italy) Agnese Allegrini	(Indonesia) Andrei Adistia (Indonesia) Christopher Rusdianto	(Canada) Charmaine Reid (Canada) Nicole Grether	(Ukraine) Valeriy Atrashchenkov (Ukraine) Anna Kobceva
2012	(India) B. Sai Praneeth	(India) Arundhati Pantawane	(India) Rupesh Kumar (India) Sanave Thomas	(Thailand) Rodjana Chuthabunditkul (Thailand) Chanida Julrattanamanee	(India) Tanveer Gill (India) Mohita Sahdev
2013	(India) Sameer Verma	(India) Tanvi Lad	(India) Rupesh Kumar (India) Sanave Thomas	(India) Pradnya Gadre (India) N. Siki Reddy	(India) Sanave Thomas (India) Prajakta Sawant
2014	(Indonesia) Firman Abdul Kholik	(India) P. C. Thulasi	(Indonesia) Yohanes Rendy Sugiarto (Indonesia) Afiat Yuris Wirawan	(Russia) Ekaterina Bolotova (Russia) Evgeniya Kosetskaya	(Russia) Vitalij Durkin (Russia) Nina Vislova
2015	(India) Sameer Verma	(Thailand) Nitchaon Jindapol	(Thailand) Bodin Isara (Thailand) Nipitphon Phuangphuapet	(Thailand) Savitree Amitrapai (Thailand) Pacharapun Chochuwong	(Thailand) Bodin Isara (Thailand) Savitree Amitrapai
2016	(India) Pratul Joshi	(Indonesia) Sri Fatmawati	(Russia) Evgenij Dremin (Russia) Denis Grachev	(Bahrain) Tanisha Crasto (Indonesia) Aprilsasi Putri Lejarsar Variella	(Russia) Evgenij Dremin (Russia) Evgenia Dimova
2017– 2020	No competition				
2021	(Indonesia) Ikhsan Rumbay	(United States) Lauren Lam	(Indonesia) Raymond Indra (Indonesia) Daniel Edgar Marvino	(Hong Kong) Yeung Nga Ting (Hong Kong) Yeung Pui Lam	(Hong Kong) Law Cheuk Him (Hong Kong) Yeung Nga Ting
2022	(Malaysia) Ng Tze Yong	(Thailand) Pitchamon Opatniput	(Indonesia) Rayhan Fadillah (Indonesia) Rahmat Hidayat	(Indonesia) Lanny Tria Mayasari (Indonesia) Ribka Sugiarto	(Thailand) Ruttanapak Oupthong (Thailand) Jhenicha Sudjaipraparat
2023	(Japan) Minoru Koga	(China) Chen Lu	(Japan) Kazuki Shibata (Japan) Naoki Yamada	(Bulgaria) Gabriela Stoeva (Bulgaria) Stefani Stoeva	(China) Zhou Zhihong (China) Yang Jiayi
2024	No competition				

== Performances by countries ==
As of the 2023 edition

Pos.	Country	MS	WS	MD	WD	XD	Total
1	India	6	4	4	1	3	18
2	Indonesia	3	1	4	1.5	1	10.5
3	Thailand	0	2	1	2	2	7
4	Russia	0	0	1	1	2	4
5	Canada	0	0	0	2	0	2
5	China	0	1	0	0	1	2
5	Hong Kong	0	0	0	1	1	2
5	Japan	1	0	1	0	0	2
9	Bulgaria	0	0	0	1	0	1
9	Germany	0	0	0	1	0	1
9	Greece	0	1	0	0	0	1
9	Italy	0	1	0	0	0	1
9	Malaysia	1	0	0	0	0	1
9	Ukraine	0	0	0	0	1	1
9	United States	0	1	0	0	0	1
16	Bahrain*	0	0	0	0.5	0	0.5
Total		11	11	11	11	11	55

* Host nation
