= Bodin Isara =

Thai badminton player

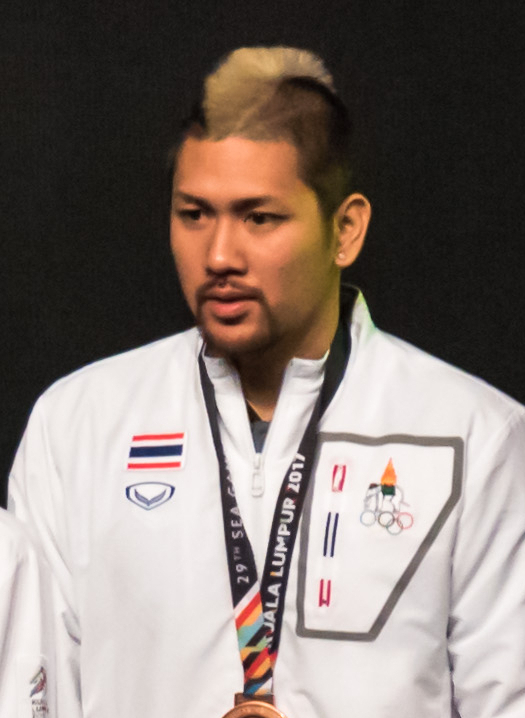
- Isara at the 2017 SEA Games

Personal information
- Born: 12 December 1990 (age 35) Bangkok, Thailand
- Height: 1.75 m (5 ft 9 in)

Sport
- Country: Thailand
- Sport: Badminton
- Handedness: Left

Men's & mixed doubles
- Highest ranking: 7 (MD 10 January 2013); 10 (XD 10 February 2017)
- BWF profile
Medal record
Men's badminton
Representing Thailand
Sudirman Cup
Bronze medal – third place	2017 Gold Coast	Mixed team
Asian Games
Bronze medal – third place	2010 Guangzhou	Men's team
Asia Mixed Team Championships
Bronze medal – third place	2017 Ho Chi Minh	Mixed team
SEA Games
Silver medal – second place	2015 Singapore	Men's team
Silver medal – second place	2019 Philippines	Men's doubles
Bronze medal – third place	2009 Vientiane	Men's team
Bronze medal – third place	2011 Jakarta–Palembang	Men's team
Bronze medal – third place	2017 Kuala Lumpur	Men's doubles
Bronze medal – third place	2017 Kuala Lumpur	Mixed doubles
Bronze medal – third place	2017 Kuala Lumpur	Men's team
Bronze medal – third place	2019 Philippines	Men's team
Summer Universiade
Gold medal – first place	2011 Shenzhen	Men's doubles
Bronze medal – third place	2011 Shenzhen	Mixed team
Bronze medal – third place	2015 Gwangju	Men's doubles
Bronze medal – third place	2015 Gwangju	Mixed team

Bodin Isara (Thai: บดินทร์ อิสสระ;born 12 December 1990) is badminton player and Rattana Bundit University's student from Thailand. He competed for Thailand at the 2012 Summer Olympics with Maneepong Jongjit but was defeated in the quarterfinals by Malaysia's Koo Kien Keat and Tan Boon Heong. In 2013, Isara switched from competing for the national squad to competing for the Granular Club, an independent badminton club in Thailand. Currently his partner is Nipitphon Phuangphuapet.

On 21 July 2013, Isara was suspended for two years for his role in a brawl with former teammate Maneepong Jongjit during the men's doubles final at the 2013 Canada Open Grand Prix.

== Achievements ==
=== SEA Games ===
Men's doubles
Year	Venue	Partner	Opponent	Score	Result
2017	Axiata Arena; Kuala Lumpur, Malaysia	(Thailand) Nipitphon Phuangphuapet	(Malaysia) Ong Yew Sin (Malaysia) Teo Ee Yi	12–21, 15–21	Bronze
2019	Muntinlupa Sports Complex; Metro Manila, Philippines	(Thailand) Maneepong Jongjit	(Malaysia) Aaron Chia (Malaysia) Soh Wooi Yik	21–18, 15–21, 16–21	Silver

Mixed doubles
Year	Venue	Partner	Opponent	Score	Result
2017	Axiata Arena; Kuala Lumpur, Malaysia	(Thailand) Savitree Amitrapai	(Malaysia) Goh Soon Huat (Malaysia) Shevon Jemie Lai	21–18, 24–26, 18–21	Bronze

=== Summer Universiade ===
Men's doubles
Year	Venue	Partner	Opponent	Score	Result
2011	Gymnasium of SZIIT; Shenzhen, China	(Thailand) Maneepong Jongjit	(Chinese Taipei) Fang Chieh-min (Chinese Taipei) Lee Sheng-mu	21–10, 21–16	Gold
2015	Hwasun Hanium Culture Sports Center; Hwasun, South Korea	(Thailand) Nipitphon Phuangphuapet	(South Korea) Kim Gi-jung (South Korea) Kim Sa-rang	13–21, 11–21	Bronze

=== BWF World Tour ===
The BWF World Tour, which was announced on 19 March 2017 and implemented in 2018, is a series of elite badminton tournaments sanctioned by the Badminton World Federation (BWF). The BWF World Tour is divided into levels of World Tour Finals, Super 1000, Super 750, Super 500, Super 300 (part of the HSBC World Tour), and the BWF Tour Super 100.

Men's doubles
Year	Tournament	Level	Partner	Opponent	Score	Result
2018	Spain Masters	Super 300	(Thailand) Maneepong Jongjit	(South Korea) Kim Gi-jung (South Korea) Lee Yong-dae	13–21, 17–21	(silver) Runner-up

=== BWF Superseries ===
The BWF Superseries, which was launched on 14 December 2006 and implemented in 2007, was a series of elite badminton tournaments, sanctioned by the Badminton World Federation (BWF). BWF Superseries levels were Superseries and Superseries Premier. A season of Superseries consisted of twelve tournaments around the world that had been introduced since 2011. Successful players were invited to the Superseries Finals, which were held at the end of each year.

Men's doubles
Year	Tournament	Partner	Opponent	Score	Result
2012	India Open	(Thailand) Maneepong Jongjit	(South Korea) Ko Sung-hyun (South Korea) Yoo Yeon-seong	21–17, 14–21, 21–14	(gold) Winner
2012	French Open	(Thailand) Maneepong Jongjit	(South Korea) Ko Sung-hyun (South Korea) Lee Yong-dae	24–22, 17–21, 11–21	(silver) Runner-up
2016	Denmark Open	(Thailand) Nipitphon Phuangphuapet	(Malaysia) Goh V Shem (Malaysia) Tan Wee Kiong	21–14, 20–22, 19–21	(silver) Runner-up
2016	French Open	(Thailand) Nipitphon Phuangphuapet	(Denmark) Mathias Boe (Denmark) Carsten Mogensen	21–19, 19–21, 0–3 retired	(silver) Runner-up

BWF Super Series Finals tournament
BWF Super Series Premier tournament
BWF Super Series tournament

=== BWF Grand Prix ===
The BWF Grand Prix had two levels, the Grand Prix and Grand Prix Gold. It was a series of badminton tournaments sanctioned by the Badminton World Federation (BWF) and played between 2007 and 2017.

Men's doubles
Year	Tournament	Partner	Opponent	Score	Result
2011	Bitburger Open	(Thailand) Maneepong Jongjit	(China) Liu Xiaolong (China) Qiu Zihan	21–14, 21–16	(gold) Winner
2012	Vietnam Open	(Thailand) Maneepong Jongjit	(Indonesia) Yohanes Rendy Sugiarto (Indonesia) Afiat Yuris Wirawan	19–21, 21–16, 21–11	(gold) Winner
2013	Canada Open	(Thailand) Pakkawat Vilailak	(Thailand) Maneepong Jongjit (Thailand) Nipitphon Phuangphuapet	12–21, disqualified	(silver) Runner-up
2015	Mexico City Grand Prix	(Thailand) Nipitphon Phuangphuapet	(India) Manu Attri (India) B. Sumeeth Reddy	20–22, 18–21	(silver) Runner-up

Mixed doubles
Year	Tournament	Partner	Opponent	Score	Result
2016	Swiss Open	(Thailand) Savitree Amitrapai	(China) Wang Yilyu (China) Chen Qingchen	21–19, 16–21, 15–21	(silver) Runner-up

BWF Grand Prix Gold tournament
BWF Grand Prix tournament

=== BWF International Challenge/Series ===
Men's doubles
Year	Tournament	Partner	Opponent	Score	Result
2009	Smiling Fish International	(Thailand) Maneepong Jongjit	(Thailand) Songphon Anugritayawon (Thailand) Nitipong Saengsila	21–12, 21–12	(gold) Winner
2009	Malaysia International	(Thailand) Maneepong Jongjit	(Malaysia) Chan Peng Soon (Malaysia) Lim Khim Wah	20–22, 26–28	(silver) Runner-up
2010	Kaohsiung International	(Thailand) Maneepong Jongjit	(Chinese Taipei) Liao Chao-hsiang (Chinese Taipei) Tsai Chia-hsin	21–18, 21–19	(gold) Winner
2015	Kharkiv International	(Thailand) Nipitphon Phuangphuapet	(Poland) Adam Cwalina (Poland) Przemysław Wacha	21–18, 21–13	(gold) Winner
2015	Bahrain International	(Thailand) Nipitphon Phuangphuapet	(Thailand) Wannawat Ampunsuwan (Thailand) Tinn Isriyanet	21–9, 21–14	(gold) Winner
2018	Spanish International	(Thailand) Maneepong Jongjit	(Denmark) Frederik Colberg (Denmark) Joachim Fischer Nielsen	23–21, 19–21, 15–21	(silver) Runner-up

Mixed doubles
Year	Tournament	Partner	Opponent	Score	Result
2015	Swiss International	(Thailand) Savitree Amitrapai	(Scotland) Robert Blair (Indonesia) Pia Zebadiah Bernadet	21–18, 23–25, 18–21	(silver) Runner-up
2015	Bahrain International	(Thailand) Savitree Amitrapai	(Singapore) Danny Bawa Chrisnanta (Singapore) Vanessa Neo	21–17, 21–19	(gold) Winner
2015	Malaysia International	(Thailand) Savitree Amitrapai	(Indonesia) Hafiz Faizal (Indonesia) Shella Devi Aulia	21–13, 21–6	(gold) Winner

BWF International Challenge tournament
BWF International Series tournament

== Competition ban and arrest ==
On 21 July 2013, Isara and his former partner, Jongjit had a brawl during the change of ends of the men's doubles finals at the 2013 Canadian Open Grand Prix. As a result, both players received a sanction from the Badminton World Federation and from the Badminton Association of Thailand. Isara was banned for 2 years from participating in any international tournaments. Jongjit was banned for 3 months. In addition, Isara and Vilailak received a black card during the event meaning disqualification from the tournament and the tournament victory was awarded to Jongjit and Phuangphuapet.

On 9 December 2022, Isara was arrested after allegedly playing a part in abducting and doing physical harm to a teenager who allegedly owed 1 million Thai Baht from illegal betting for the 2022 FIFA World Cup.
