= Badminton at the 2011 Summer Universiade =

Badminton was contested at the 2011 Summer Universiade from August 16 to August 22 at the Gymnasium of Shenzhen Institute of Information Technology in Shenzhen, China. Men's and women's singles, men's, women's, and mixed doubles, and mixed team events were contested. The training venue was held at the Badminton Hall of Longgang Sports Center.

== Medal summary ==
=== Medal table ===
* Host nation (China)

Rank	Nation	Gold	Silver	Bronze	Total
1	Thailand	2	0	3	5
2	South Korea	2	0	0	2
3	Chinese Taipei	1	4	4	9
4	Indonesia	1	0	2	3
5	China*	0	2	2	4
6	Japan	0	0	1	1
Totals (6 entries)		6	6	12	24

=== Events ===
Event	Gold	Silver	Bronze
Men's singles	Suppanyu Avihingsanon; Thailand	Wen Kai; China	Takuma Ueda; Japan
Men's singles	Suppanyu Avihingsanon; Thailand	Wen Kai; China	Hsueh Hsuan-yi; Chinese Taipei
Women's singles	Cheng Shao-chieh; Chinese Taipei	Pai Hsiao-ma; Chinese Taipei	Liu Fang Hua; China
Women's singles	Cheng Shao-chieh; Chinese Taipei	Pai Hsiao-ma; Chinese Taipei	Shi Xiao Qian; China
Men's doubles	Thailand; Bodin Isara; Maneepong Jongjit	Chinese Taipei; Fang Chieh-min; Lee Sheng-mu	Indonesia; Yohanes Rendy Sugiarto; Afiat Yuris Wirawan
Men's doubles	Thailand; Bodin Isara; Maneepong Jongjit	Chinese Taipei; Fang Chieh-min; Lee Sheng-mu	Chinese Taipei; Liao Min-chun; Wu Chun-wei
Women's doubles	South Korea; Eom Hye-won; Jang Ye-na	Chinese Taipei; Pai Hsiao-ma; Cheng Shao-chieh	Thailand; Nessara Somsri; Savitree Amitrapai
Women's doubles	South Korea; Eom Hye-won; Jang Ye-na	Chinese Taipei; Pai Hsiao-ma; Cheng Shao-chieh	Chinese Taipei; Hsieh Pei-chen; Wang Pei-rong
Mixed doubles	South Korea; Shin Baek-cheol; Eom Hye-won	Chinese Taipei; Lee Sheng-mu; Hsieh Pei-chen	Indonesia; Riky Widianto; Shendy Puspa Irawati
Mixed doubles	South Korea; Shin Baek-cheol; Eom Hye-won	Chinese Taipei; Lee Sheng-mu; Hsieh Pei-chen	Thailand; Maneepong Jongjit; Savitree Amitrapai
Mixed team	Indonesia; Hera Desi; Afiat Yuris Wirawan; Bellaetrix Manuputty; Senatria Agus Setia Putra; Rian Agung Saputro; Jenna Gozali; Angga Pratama; Yohanes Rendy Sugiarto; Shendy Puspa Irawati; Komala Dewi; Riky Widianto	China; Tao Xun; Wen Kai; Lin Qing; Chen Yulu; Hu Wenqing; Liu Fang Hua; Shi Xiao Qian; Li Tian; Ye Ao Ting; Chen Ni	Thailand; Suppanyu Avihingsanon; Bodin Isara; Maneepong Jongjit; Parinyawat Thongnuam; Nichaon Jindapon; Chanida Julrattanamanee; Savitree Amitrapai; Nessara Somsri
Mixed team	Indonesia; Hera Desi; Afiat Yuris Wirawan; Bellaetrix Manuputty; Senatria Agus Setia Putra; Rian Agung Saputro; Jenna Gozali; Angga Pratama; Yohanes Rendy Sugiarto; Shendy Puspa Irawati; Komala Dewi; Riky Widianto	China; Tao Xun; Wen Kai; Lin Qing; Chen Yulu; Hu Wenqing; Liu Fang Hua; Shi Xiao Qian; Li Tian; Ye Ao Ting; Chen Ni	Chinese Taipei; Chang Hsin-yun; Lai Chia-wen; Wang Pei-rong; Cheng Shao-chieh; Pai Hsiao-ma; Lee Sheng-mu; Liao Min-chun; Hsieh Pei-chen; Hsueh Hsuan-yi; Fang Chieh-min; Chou Tien-chen; Wu Chun-wei
