= Maneepong Jongjit =

Thai badminton player (born 1991)

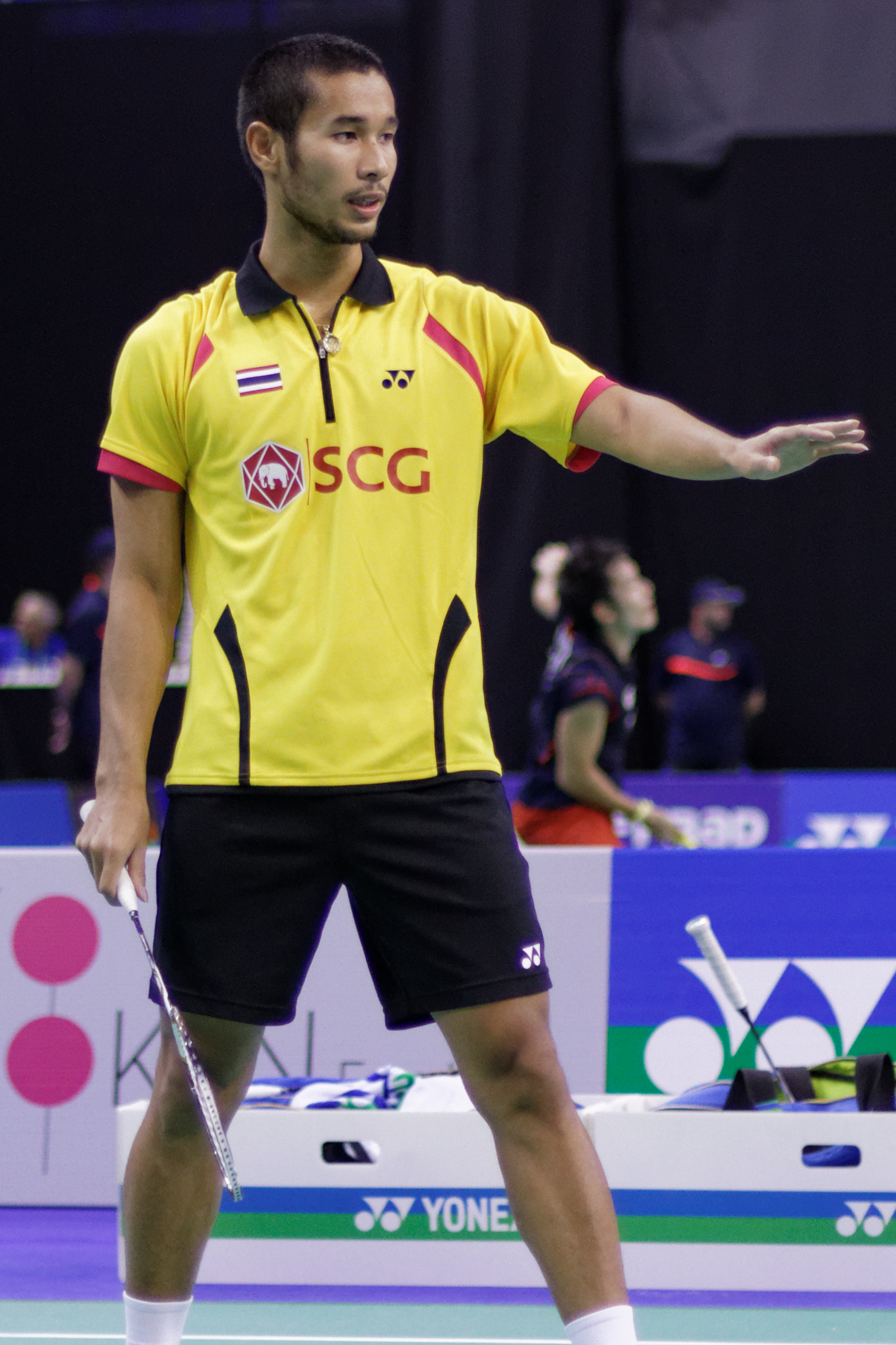
- Maneepong Jongjit at the 2013 French Super Series.

Personal information
- Born: 21 March 1991 (age 35) Phuket, Thailand
- Height: 1.79 m (5 ft 10 in)

Sport
- Country: Thailand
- Sport: Badminton
- Handedness: Right

Men's & mixed doubles
- Highest ranking: 7 (MD 10 January 2013); 12 (XD 23 October 2014)
- BWF profile
Medal record
Men's badminton
Representing Thailand
Sudirman Cup
Bronze medal – third place	2013 Kuala Lumpur	Mixed team
Asian Games
Bronze medal – third place	2010 Guangzhou	Men's team
Asia Championships
Bronze medal – third place	2014 Gimcheon	Men's doubles
SEA Games
Silver medal – second place	2013 Naypyidaw	Mixed doubles
Silver medal – second place	2015 Singapore	Men's team
Silver medal – second place	2019 Philippines	Men's doubles
Bronze medal – third place	2009 Vientiane	Men's team
Bronze medal – third place	2011 Jakarta–Palembang	Men's team
Bronze medal – third place	2019 Philippines	Men's team
Summer Universiade
Gold medal – first place	2011 Shenzhen	Men's doubles
Bronze medal – third place	2011 Shenzhen	Mixed doubles
Bronze medal – third place	2011 Shenzhen	Mixed team
World Junior Championships
Gold medal – first place	2009 Alor Setar	Mixed doubles
Bronze medal – third place	2009 Alor Setar	Mixed team
Asian Junior Championships
Bronze medal – third place	2009 Kuala Lumpur	Mixed doubles
Bronze medal – third place	2009 Kuala Lumpur	Mixed team

Maneepong Jongjit (Thai: มณีพงศ์ จงจิตร, RTGS: Maniphong Chongchit; born 21 March 1991) is a Thai badminton player. He studies at Ratna Bundit University.

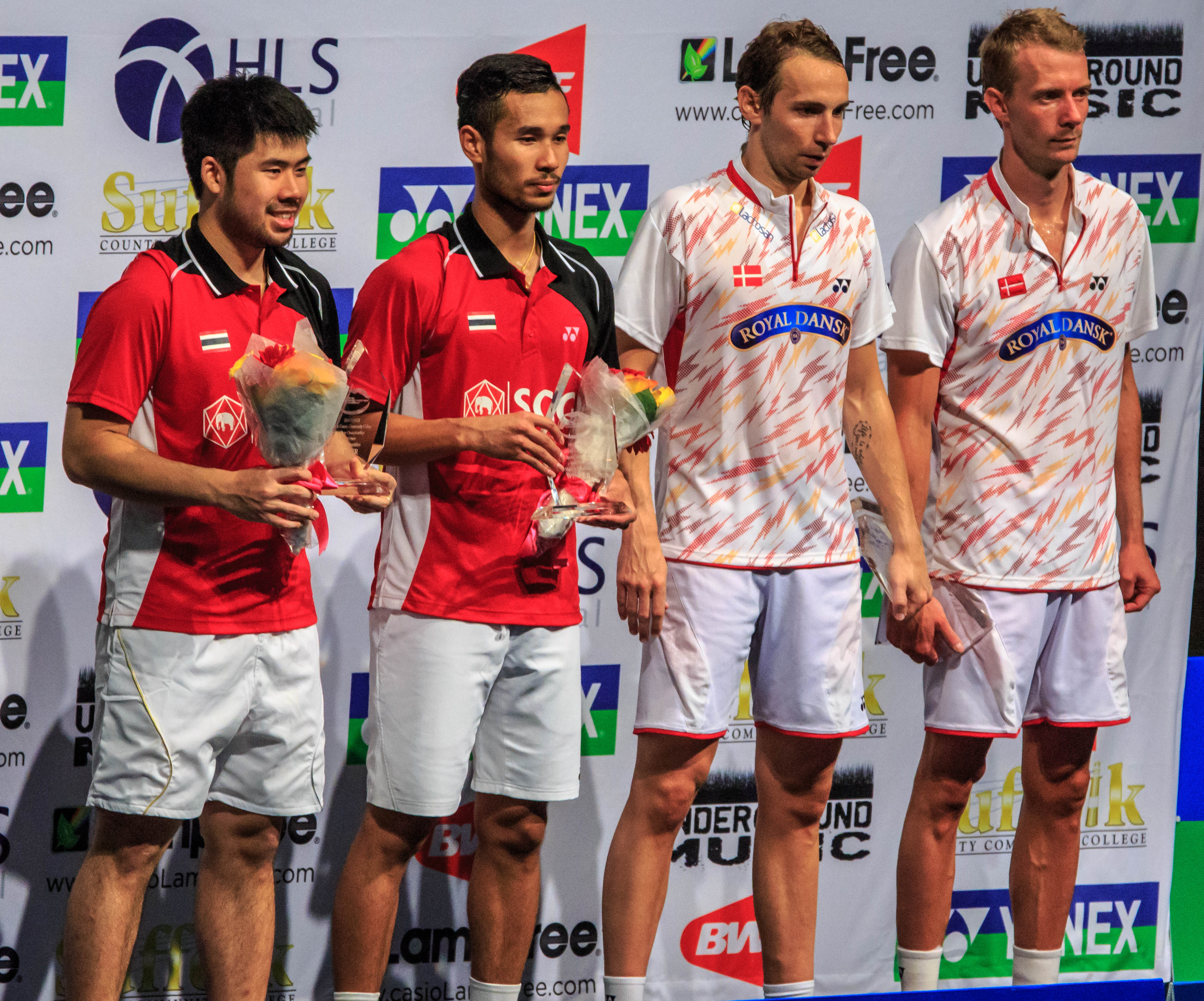
Jongjit and Nipitphon Phuangphuapet as runner-up at the 2014 U.S. Open

== Career ==
Maneepong Jongjit began to attract attention when he competed as a junior with Bodin Isara in men's doubles. Together they made the transition to doubles as senior competitors. Their top result came at the 2012 India Open where they defeated Ko Sung-hyun and Yoo Yeon-seong in the final. Jongjit and Isara competed together at the London 2012 Olympics, where they lost in the quarter-final.

After Jongjit and Isara split up in January 2013, Jongjit continued competing in men's doubles with a new partner, Nipitphon Phuangphuapet. The pair reached the final of the 2013 Canada Open Grand Prix, facing Jongjit's former partner Isara and Isara's new partner Pakkawat Vilailak. He and his current partner were awarded the victory as their opponents were disqualified after a brawl broke out between the former partners. Jongjit and Phuangphuapet won the 2014 U.S. Open, defeating Denmark's Mathias Boe and Carsten Mogensen.

After returning from suspension in October 2013, Jongjit resumed his partnerships in men's doubles with Nipitphon Phuangphuapet and in mixed doubles with Sapsiree Taerattanachai. He continued to compete internationally until late 2014. He was entered in several tournaments in 2015, reforming his partnership with Bodin Isara but withdrew each time due to an injury to his shoulder, which finally led to him announcing his retirement in November 2015.

== Achievements ==
=== Asian Championships ===
Men's doubles
Year	Venue	Partner	Opponent	Score	Result
2014	Gimcheon Indoor Stadium; Gimcheon, South Korea	(Thailand) Nipitphon Phuangphuapet	(South Korea) Shin Baek-cheol (South Korea) Yoo Yeon-seong	17–21, 20–22	Bronze

=== SEA Games ===
Men's doubles
Year	Venue	Partner	Opponent	Score	Result
2019	Muntinlupa Sports Complex; Metro Manila, Philippines	(Thailand) Bodin Isara	(Malaysia) Aaron Chia (Malaysia) Soh Wooi Yik	21–18, 15–21, 16–21	Silver

Mixed doubles
Year	Venue	Partner	Opponent	Score	Result
2013	Wunna Theikdi Indoor Stadium; Naypyidaw, Myanmar	(Thailand) Sapsiree Taerattanachai	(Indonesia) Muhammad Rijal (Indonesia) Debby Susanto	18–21, 19–21	Silver

=== Summer Universiade ===
Men's doubles
Year	Venue	Partner	Opponent	Score	Result
2011	Gymnasium of SZIIT; Shenzhen, China	(Thailand) Bodin Isara	(Chinese Taipei) Lee Sheng-mu (Chinese Taipei) Fang Chieh-min	21–10, 21–16	Gold

Mixed doubles
Year	Venue	Partner	Opponent	Score	Result
2011	Gymnasium of SZIIT; Shenzhen, China	(Thailand) Savitree Amitrapai	(South Korea) Shin Baek-cheol (South Korea) Eom Hye-won	18–21, 21–17, 19–21	Bronze

=== BWF World Junior Championships ===
Mixed doubles
Year	Venue	Partner	Opponent	Score	Result
2009	Stadium Sultan Abdul Halim; Alor Setar, Malaysia	(Thailand) Rodjana Chuthabunditkul	(Indonesia) Angga Pratama (Indonesia) Della Destiara Haris	21–19, 14–21, 21–17	Gold

=== Asian Junior Championships ===
Mixed doubles
Year	Venue	Partner	Opponent	Score	Result
2009	Stadium Juara; Kuala Lumpur, Malaysia	(Thailand) Rodjana Chuthabunditkul	(China) Liu Peixuan (China) Xia Huan	18–21, 13–21	Bronze

=== BWF World Tour ===
The BWF World Tour, which was announced on 19 March 2017 and implemented in 2018, is a series of elite badminton tournaments sanctioned by the Badminton World Federation (BWF). The BWF World Tour is divided into levels of World Tour Finals, Super 1000, Super 750, Super 500, Super 300 (part of the HSBC World Tour), and the BWF Tour Super 100.

Men's doubles
Year	Tournament	Level	Partner	Opponent	Score	Result
2018	Spain Masters	Super 300	(Thailand) Bodin Isara	(South Korea) Kim Gi-jung (South Korea) Lee Yong-dae	13–21, 17–21	(silver) Runner-up

=== BWF Superseries ===
The BWF Superseries, which was launched on 14 December 2006 and implemented in 2007, was a series of elite badminton tournaments, sanctioned by the Badminton World Federation (BWF). BWF Superseries levels were Superseries and Superseries Premier. A season of Superseries consisted of twelve tournaments around the world that had been introduced since 2011. Successful players were invited to the Superseries Finals, which were held at the end of each year.

Men's doubles
Year	Tournament	Partner	Opponent	Score	Result
2012	India Open	(Thailand) Bodin Isara	(South Korea) Ko Sung-hyun (South Korea) Yoo Yeon-seong	21–17, 14–21, 21–14	(gold) Winner
2012	French Open	(Thailand) Bodin Isara	(South Korea) Ko Sung-hyun (South Korea) Lee Yong-dae	24–22, 17–21, 11–21	(silver) Runner-up

BWF Super Series Finals tournament
BWF Super Series Premier tournament
BWF Super Series tournament

=== BWF Grand Prix ===
The BWF Grand Prix had two levels, the Grand Prix and Grand Prix Gold. It was a series of badminton tournaments sanctioned by the Badminton World Federation (BWF) and played between 2007 and 2017.

Men's doubles
Year	Tournament	Partner	Opponent	Score	Result
2011	Bitburger Open	(Thailand) Bodin Isara	(China) Liu Xiaolong (China) Qiu Zihan	21–14, 21–16	(gold) Winner
2012	Vietnam Open	(Thailand) Bodin Isara	(Indonesia) Yohanes Rendy Sugiarto (Indonesia) Afiat Yuris Wirawan	19–21, 21–16, 21–11	(gold) Winner
2013	Canada Open	(Thailand) Nipitphon Phuangphuapet	(Thailand) Bodin Isara (Thailand) Pakkawat Vilailak	21–12, disqualified	(gold) Winner
2014	U.S. Open	(Thailand) Nipitphon Phuangphuapet	(Denmark) Mathias Boe (Denmark) Carsten Mogensen	21–17, 15–21, 21–18	(gold) Winner

Mixed doubles
Year	Tournament	Partner	Opponent	Score	Result
2014	U.S. Open	(Thailand) Sapsiree Taerattanachai	(Indonesia) Muhammad Rijal (Indonesia) Vita Marissa	16–21, 19–21	(silver) Runner-up

BWF Grand Prix Gold tournament
BWF Grand Prix tournament

=== BWF International Challenge/Series ===
Men's doubles
Year	Tournament	Partner	Opponent	Score	Result
2009	Smiling Fish International	(Thailand) Bodin Isara	(Thailand) Songphon Anugritayawon (Thailand) Nitipong Saengsila	21–12, 21–12	(gold) Winner
2009	Malaysia International	(Thailand) Bodin Isara	(Malaysia) Chan Peng Soon (Malaysia) Lim Khim Wah	20–22, 26–28	(silver) Runner-up
2010	Kaohsiung International	(Thailand) Bodin Isara	(Chinese Taipei) Liao Chao-hsiang (Chinese Taipei) Tsai Chia-hsin	21–18, 21–19	(gold) Winner
2017	Tata Open India International	(Thailand) Nanthakarn Yordphaisong	(Malaysia) Aaron Chia (Malaysia) Soh Wooi Yik	21–6, 21–9	(gold) Winner
2018	Vietnam International	(Thailand) Nanthakarn Yordphaisong	(Malaysia) Aaron Chia (Malaysia) Soh Wooi Yik	21–18, 21–14	(gold) Winner
2018	Spanish International	(Thailand) Bodin Isara	(Denmark) Frederik Colberg (Denmark) Joachim Fischer Nielsen	23–21, 19–21, 15–21	(silver) Runner-up

Mixed doubles
Year	Tournament	Partner	Opponent	Score	Result
2010	Smiling Fish International	(Thailand) Rodjana Chuthabunditkul	(Thailand) Patiphat Chalardchaleam (Thailand) Savitree Amitrapai	19–21, 20–22	(silver) Runner-up

BWF International Challenge tournament
BWF International Series tournament
BWF Future Series tournament

== Controversy ==
On 21 July 2013, Jongjit and his former partner, Bodin Isara had a brawl during the change of ends of the men's doubles finals at the 2013 Canadian Open Grand Prix. Jongjit, who was partnered with Nipitphon Phuangphuapet, met Isara and his new partner, Pakkawat Vilailak in the finals. The former partners who had unresolved issues with each other prior to the match started abusing each other vocally during the first game. This led Isara to begin chasing down Jongit across the arena. As an act of self-defense while running away from Isara, Jongit swung his badminton racquet to the side of Isara's head causing his right ear to bleed and require stitches. Isara eventually caught up with Jongit, who fell to the floor on the adjacent court, and began hitting, punching and kicking him. The two were eventually broken up by Isara's partner and their coach, but shouting continued across the court. As a result, both players received a sanction from the Badminton World Federation and from the Badminton Association of Thailand. Isara, the more physically abusive one among the two, was banned for 2 years from participating in any international tournaments. Jongjit, who provoked Isara during the match, was banned for 3 months. In addition, Isara and Vilailak received a black card during the event meaning disqualification from the tournament and the tournament victory was awarded to Jongjit and Phuangphuapet.

== Record Against Selected Opponents ==
Men's doubles results with Bodin Isara against Super Series finalists, World Championships semifinalists, and Olympic quarterfinalists.

- (China) Chai Biao & Guo Zhendong 0–2
- (China) Cai Yun & Fu Haifeng 0–1
- (Chinese Taipei) Fang Chieh-min & Lee Sheng-mu 0–2
- (Denmark) Jonas Rasmussen & Mads Conrad-Petersen 1–1
- (Indonesia) Mohammad Ahsan & Bona Septano 1–1
- (Indonesia) Angga Pratama & Rian Agung Saputro 2–0
- (Japan) Hirokatsu Hashimoto & Noriyasu Hirata 1–0
- (South Korea) Jung Jae-sung & Lee Yong-dae 0–2
- (South Korea) Ko Sung-hyun & Yoo Yeon-seong 3–0
- (Malaysia) Choong Tan Fook & Lee Wan Wah 0–1
- (Malaysia) Mohd Zakry Abdul Latif & Mohd Fairuzizuan Mohd Tazari 0–1
- (Malaysia) Koo Kien Keat & Tan Boon Heong 0–2
- (Poland) Adam Cwalina & Michał Łogosz 1–0
- (United States) Howard Bach & Tony Gunawan 1–0

== Royal decoration ==
- 2010 - Silver Medalist (Seventh Class) of The Most Admirable Order of the Direkgunabhorn
