= Yohanes Rendy Sugiarto =

Indonesian badminton player

Personal information
- Born: 16 August 1991 (age 35) Banyumas Regency, Central Java, Indonesia
- Height: 1.80 m (5 ft 11 in)

Sport
- Country: Indonesia
- Sport: Badminton
- Handedness: Right

Men's & mixed doubles
- Highest ranking: 34 (MD 3 November 2011); 270 (XD 1 September 2016)
- BWF profile
Medal record
Men's badminton
Representing Indonesia
Summer Universiade
Gold medal – first place	2011 Shenzhen	Mixed team
Bronze medal – third place	2011 Shenzhen	Men's doubles
World Junior Championships
Bronze medal – third place	2009 Alor Setar	Boys' doubles
Asian Junior Championships
Gold medal – first place	2009 Kuala Lumpur	Boys' doubles

Yohanes Rendy Sugiarto (born 16 August 1991) is an Indonesian badminton player from PB Djarum club. He was the boys' doubles gold medalist at the 2009 Asian Junior Badminton Championships partnered with Angga Pratama.

== Achievements ==
=== Summer Universiade ===
Men's doubles
Year	Venue	Partner	Opponent	Score	Result
2011	Gymnasium of SZIIT; Shenzhen, China	(Indonesia) Afiat Yuris Wirawan	(Chinese Taipei) Fang Chieh-min (Chinese Taipei) Lee Sheng-mu	18–21, 15–21	Bronze

=== BWF World Junior championships ===
Boys' doubles
Year	Venue	Partner	Opponent	Score	Result
2009	Stadium Sultan Abdul Halim; Alor Setar, Malaysia	(Indonesia) Angga Pratama	(Malaysia) Chooi Kah Ming (Malaysia) Ow Yao Han	21–13, 15–21, 18–21	Bronze

=== Asian Junior championships ===
Boys' doubles
Year	Venue	Partner	Opponent	Score	Result
2009	Stadium Juara; Kuala Lumpur, Malaysia	(Indonesia) Angga Pratama	(Malaysia) Ow Yao Han (Malaysia) Yew Hong Kheng	21–15, 21–16	Gold

=== BWF Grand Prix ===
The BWF Grand Prix had two levels, the Grand Prix and Grand Prix Gold. It was a series of badminton tournaments sanctioned by the Badminton World Federation (BWF) and played between 2007 and 2017.

Men's doubles
Year	Tournament	Partner	Opponent	Score	Result
2012	Vietnam Open	(Indonesia) Afiat Yuris Wirawan	(Thailand) Bodin Isara (Thailand) Maneepong Jongjit	21–19, 16–21, 11–21	(silver) Runner-up

BWF Grand Prix Gold tournament
BWF Grand Prix tournament

=== BWF International Challenge/Series ===
Men's doubles
Year	Tournament	Partner	Opponent	Score	Result
2014	USM Indonesia International	(Indonesia) Afiat Yuris Wirawan	(Indonesia) Seiko Wahyu Kusdianto (Indonesia) Tedi Supriadi	21–18, 21–17	(gold) Winner
2014	Bahrain International Challenge	(Indonesia) Afiat Yuris Wirawan	(Indonesia) Fran Kurniawan (Indonesia) Agripina Prima Rahmanto Putra	23–21, 21–15	(gold) Winner

BWF International Challenge tournament
BWF International Series tournament
