= Badminton at the 2011 Summer Universiade – Mixed team =

The mixed team badminton event at the 2011 Summer Universiade was held from August 16 to August 18 at the Shenzhen Polytechnic Gym and the Badminton Hall of Longgang Sports Center in Shenzhen, China. The teams play in pools in a round robin preliminary round, and the top teams from each pool advances to the playoffs.

== Medalists ==
Gold	Indonesia; Indonesia
Silver	China; China
Bronze	Thailand; Thailand
Bronze	Chinese Taipei; Chinese Taipei

== Preliminary round ==
=== Group A ===
Nation	Pld	W	L	GF	GA
China (CHN)	3	3	0	13	2
Japan (JPN)	3	2	1	12	3
Russia (RUS)	3	1	2	10	5
Syria (SYR)	3	0	3	0	15

=== Group B ===
Nation	Pld	W	L	GF	GA
Thailand (THA)	3	3	0	13	2
Great Britain (GBR)	3	2	1	10	5
Spain (ESP)	3	1	2	7	8
Macau (MAC)	3	0	3	0	15

=== Group C ===
Nation	Pld	W	L	GF	GA
Indonesia (INA)	4	4	0	18	2
Malaysia (MAS)	4	3	1	16	4
Germany (GER)	4	2	2	10	10
Hong Kong (HKG)	4	1	2	5	15
Sri Lanka (SRI)	4	0	4	1	19

=== Group D ===
Nation	Pld	W	L	GF	GA
Chinese Taipei (TPE)	3	3	0	14	1
South Korea (KOR)	3	2	1	11	4
France (FRA)	3	1	2	4	11
India (IND)	3	0	3	1	14

== Playoffs ==
Quarterfinals
A1	China (CHN)	2	2	2
C2	Malaysia (MAS)	1	1	0
B1	Thailand (THA)	1	2	2	2
D2	South Korea (KOR)	2	1	0	0
A2	Japan (JPN)	1	2	0	0
C1	Indonesia (INA)	2	0	2	2
B2	Great Britain (GBR)	1	0	0
D1	Chinese Taipei (TPE)	2	2	2

Semifinals
A1	China (CHN)	2	2	2
B1	Thailand (THA) (bronze)	1	1	0
C1	Indonesia (INA)	0	0	2	2	2
D1	Chinese Taipei (TPE) (bronze)	2	2	0	0	0

Finals
A1	China (CHN) (silver)	1	2	1	0
C1	Indonesia (INA) (gold)	2	0	2	2
