= 2014 Chinese Taipei Open Grand Prix Gold =

Tournament details
- Dates: 15 – 20 July 2014
- Level: Grand Prix Gold
- Total prize money: US$200,000
- Venue: Taipei Arena
- Location: Taipei, Chinese Taipei

Champions
- Men's singles: (China) Lin Dan
- Women's singles: (South Korea) Sung Ji-hyun
- Men's doubles: (Indonesia) Andrei Adistia (Indonesia) Hendra Aprida Gunawan
- Women's doubles: (Indonesia) Nitya Krishinda Maheswari (Indonesia) Greysia Polii
- Mixed doubles: (China) Liu Yuchen (China) Yu Xiaohan

The 2014 Chinese Taipei Open Grand Prix Gold was the ninth grand prix gold and grand prix tournament of the 2014 BWF Grand Prix Gold and Grand Prix. The tournament was held in Taipei Arena, Taipei, Chinese Taipei July 15–20, 2013 and had a total purse of $200,000.

== Players by nation ==
Nation	First round	Second round	Third round	Quarterfinals	Semifinals	Final
(Chinese Taipei)	19	12	3	1	2	
(Malaysia)	17	7		1		
(Japan)	9	3		3	2	
(Indonesia)	8	4	2	3	2	1
(India)	8	4				
(Thailand)	8	1		1		
(South Korea)	6	4		7		
(Hong Kong)	3	4	3	1	3	
(China)	3	3		2	1	4
(Finland)	1	2				
(United States)	1	1				
(England)	1					
(Sweden)	1					
(Austria)	1					
(Russia)	1					
(Vietnam)		2		1		

== Men's singles ==
=== Seeds ===
1. (South Korea) Son Wan-ho (quarter-final)
2. (China) Wang Zhengming (final)
3. (Hong Kong) Hu Yun (third round)
4. (Vietnam) Nguyen Tien Minh (quarter-final)
5. (Indonesia) Simon Santoso (third round)
6. (Chinese Taipei) Chou Tien-chen (first round)
7. (China) Lin Dan (champion)
8. (Chinese Taipei) Hsu Jen-hao (third round)
9. (Japan) Takuma Ueda (quarter-final)
10. (Hong Kong) Wei Nan (semi-final)
11. (South Korea) Lee Dong-keun (second round)
12. (India) Sourabh Varma (withdrew)
13. (Sweden) Henri Hurskainen (first round)
14. (Malaysia) Tan Chun Seang (second round)
15. (Hong Kong) Wong Wing Ki (third round)
16. (Chinese Taipei) Wang Tzu-wei (third round)

=== Finals ===
Quarterfinals
1	(South Korea) Son Wan-ho	21	16	16
(Japan) Riichi Takeshita	19	21	21
9	(Japan) Takuma Ueda	15	10
7	(China) Lin Dan	21	21
10	(Hong Kong) Wei Nan	16	22	21
4	(Vietnam) Nguyen Tien Minh	21	20	15
(Japan) Kazumasa Sakai	20	14
2	(China) Wang Zhengming	22	21

Semifinals
(Japan) Riichi Takeshita	15	21	18
7	(China) Lin Dan	21	14	21
10	(Hong Kong) Wei Nan	18	16
2	(China) Wang Zhengming	21	21

Final
7	(China) Lin Dan	21	21
2	(China) Wang Zhengming	19	14

=== Top half ===
==== Section 1 ====
First Round
1	(South Korea) Son W-h	21	21
(Indonesia) A Tedjono	10	13
(Indonesia) A Marteen	21	9	12
Q7	(China) Shi YQ	16	21	21
16	(Chinese Taipei) Wang T-w	22	21
(India) A Prakash	20	15
(Indonesia) F Hadmadi	21	15	21
(Chinese Taipei) Hsueh H-y	17	21	9

Second Round
1	(South Korea) Son W-h	21	21
Q7	(China) Shi YQ	13	13
16	(Chinese Taipei) Wang T-w	21	19	21
(Indonesia) F Hadmadi	13	21	11

Third Round
1	(South Korea) Shon W-h	21	21
16	(Chinese Taipei) Wang T-w	19	11

==== Section 2 ====
First Round
6	(Chinese Taipei) Chou T-c	21	17	18
Q8	(Indonesia) A Ginting	18	21	21
(Chinese Taipei) Yang C-h	20	21	11
(Malaysia) Chiang JS	22	16	5^{r}
14	(Malaysia) Tan CS	21	20	21
PFQ	(Chinese Taipei) Chu H-c	6	22	17
(Indonesia) A Yunus	12^{r}
(Japan) R Takeshita	17

Second Round
Q8	(Indonesia) A Ginting	15	21	21
(Chinese Taipei) Yang C-h	21	18	10
14	(Malaysia) Tan CS	21	19	12
(Japan) R Takeshita	19	21	21

Third Round
Q8	(Indonesia) A Ginting	17	21
(Japan) R Takeshita	21	23

==== Section 3 ====
First Round
3	(Hong Kong) Hu Y	21	21
(Finland) A Kaisti	15	14
Q4	(Chinese Taipei) Yang C-c	14	21	21
Q1	(England) A Smith	21	19	18
9	(Japan) T Ueda	21	21
(South Korea) Park S-m	19	16
(Chinese Taipei) Lin C-h	20	21	18
(Finland) V Lang	22	13	21

Second Round
3	(Hong Kong) Hu Y	24	21
Q4	(Chinese Taipei) Yang C-c	22	11
9	(Japan) T Ueda	21	21
(Finland) V Lang	16	16

Third Round
3	(Hong Kong) Hu Y	21	17	17
9	(Japan) T Ueda	18	21	21

==== Section 4 ====
First Round
7	(China) Lin D	21	21
(Thailand) P Thongnuam	17	12
(Malaysia) Goh SH	21	18	22
(Chinese Taipei) Shih K-c	19	21	20
13	(Sweden) H Hurskainen	18	19
(Chinese Taipei) Hsu S-w	21	21
(Chinese Taipei) Yang S-j	21	15	11
(Hong Kong) Tam CH	15	21	21

Second Round
7	(China) Lin D	21	21
(Malaysia) Goh SH	16	16
(Chinese Taipei) Hsu S-w	12	16
(Hong Kong) Tam CH	21	21

Third Round
7	(China) Lin D	21	21
(Hong Kong) Tam CH	9	17

=== Bottom half ===
==== Section 5 ====
First Round
(United States) H Shu	15	11
(Hong Kong) Chan YK	21	21
(Malaysia) I Zainuddin	23	15	14
10	(Hong Kong) Wei N	21	21	21
(Japan) K Nishimoto	19	11
PFQ	(Indonesia) I Mustofa	21	21
(India) S Bhamidipati	8	22	8
5	(Indonesia) S Santoso	21	20	21

Second Round
(Hong Kong) Chan YK	15	16
10	(Hong Kong) Wei N	21	21
PFQ	(Indonesia) I Mustofa	20	18
5	(Indonesia) S Santoso	22	21

Third Round
10	(Hong Kong) Wei N	18	23	22
5	(Indonesia) S Santoso	21	21	20

==== Section 6 ====
First Round
(Malaysia) Loke KP	11	16
(Chinese Taipei) Lin Y-h	21	21
(Chinese Taipei) Lu C-h	22	15	10
11	(South Korea) Lee D-k	20	21	21
(Malaysia) B Wong	10	14
(Indonesia) E Sukamta	21	21
(Malaysia) Woon KH	12	13
4	(Vietnam) Nguyen TM	21	21

Second Round
(Chinese Taipei) Lin Y-h	19	21	21
11	(South Korea) Lee D-k	21	16	12
(Indonesia) E Sukamta	6	16
4	(Vietnam) Nguyen TM	21	21

Third Round
(Chinese Taipei) Lin Y-h	21	4	12
4	(Vietnam) Nguyen TM	19	21	21

==== Section 7 ====
First Round
(Japan) K Sakai	15	21	21
Q3	(China) Lin GP	21	19	15
(Hong Kong) Ng KL
12	(India) S Varma	wo
(Malaysia) Soo TZ	15	22	11
Q6	(Chinese Taipei) Lu C-y	21	20	21
(Malaysia) A Abdul Latif	15	19
8	(Chinese Taipei) Hsu J-h	21	21

Second Round
(Japan) K Sakai	21	21
(Hong Kong) Ng KL	18	16
Q6	(Chinese Taipei) Lu C-y	18	21	11
8	(Chinese Taipei) Hsu J-h	21	19	21

Third Round
(Japan) K Sakai	15	21	21
8	(Chinese Taipei) Hsu J-h	21	19	10

==== Section 8 ====
First Round
(Chinese Taipei) Wan C-h	21	21
Q2	(Thailand) M Narongrit	11	10
(Malaysia) Chan KB	14	10
15	(Hong Kong) Wong WK	21	21
(Finland) E Heino	21	21
Q5	(South Korea) Jeon H-j	19	18
(Indonesia) J Christie	9	16
2	(China) Wang ZM	21	21

Second Round
(Chinese Taipei) Wan C-h	9	7
15	(Hong Kong) Wong WK	21	21
(Finland) E Heino	12	9
2	(China) Wang ZM	21	21

Third Round
15	(Hong Kong) Wong WK	17	18
2	(China) Wang ZM	21	21

== Women's singles ==
=== Seeds ===
1. (South Korea) Sung Ji-hyun (champion)
2. (South Korea) Bae Yeon-ju (quarter-final)
3. (Chinese Taipei) Tai Tzu-ying (second round)
4. (China) Han Li (quarter-final)
5. (Hong Kong) Yip Pui Yin (semi-final)
6. (China) Liu Xin (final)
7. (Chinese Taipei) Pai Hsiao-ma (second round)
8. (Chinese Taipei) Hsu Ya-ching (semi-final)

=== Finals ===
Semifinals
1	(South Korea) Sung Ji-hyun	21	21
8	(Chinese Taipei) Hsu Ya-ching	19	9
5	(Hong Kong) Yip Pui Yin	21	11
6	(China) Liu Xin	23	21

Final
1	(South Korea) Sung Ji-hyun	21	21
6	(China) Liu Xin	13	18

=== Top half ===
==== Section 1 ====
First Round
1	(South Korea) Sung J-h	21	21
(India) T Lad	12	9
(Indonesia) M Wiranto	19	20
(Malaysia) S Saniru	21	22
7	(Chinese Taipei) Pai H-m	22	21
(Japan) N Okuhara	20	10
(Thailand) N Saengchote	13	21	15
(Chinese Taipei) Pai Y-p	21	14	21

Second Round
1	(South Korea) Sung J-h	21	21
(Malaysia) S Saniru	6	13
7	(Chinese Taipei) Pai H-m	13	18
(Chinese Taipei) Pai Y-p	21	21

Quarterfinals
1	(South Korea) Sung J-h	21	21
(Chinese Taipei) Pai Y-p	8	14

==== Section 2 ====
First Round
4	(China) Han L	21	21
(Chinese Taipei) Lee C-h	19	16
(China) He BJ	21	21
(Japan) S Sato	9	13
8	(Chinese Taipei) Hsu Y-c	21	21
Q1	(Chinese Taipei) Chen H-h	13	9
(Vietnam) Vu TT	21	21
(Russia) K Polikarpova	9	11

Second Round
4	(China) Han L	18	21	21
(China) He BJ	21	16	17
8	(Chinese Taipei) Hsu Y-c	21	21
(Vietnam) Vu TT	10	19

Quarterfinals
4	(China) Han L	21	20
8	(Chinese Taipei) Hsu Y-c	23	22

=== Bottom half ===
==== Section 3 ====
First Round
Q2	(Japan) A Ohori	19	21	18
(Chinese Taipei) Cheng C-y	21	17	21
(Japan) Y Hashimoto	16	11
5	(Hong Kong) Yip PY	21	21
(Indonesia) A Firdasari	21	23
(Japan) Y Kusunose	18	21
(Austria) S Prutsch	5	18
3	(Chinese Taipei) Tai T-y	21	21

Second Round
(Chinese Taipei) Cheng C-y	9	17
5	(Hong Kong) Yip PY	21	21
(Indonesia) A Firdasari	21	21
3	(Chinese Taipei) Tai T-y	13	14

Quarterfinals
5	(Hong Kong) Yip PY	21	13	22
(Indonesia) A Firdasari	17	21	20

==== Section 4 ====
First Round
(United States) I Wang	21	21
(Malaysia) Yang LL	17	15
Q4	(Indonesia) R Riodingin	14	9
6	(China) Liu X	21	21
(Japan) K Imabeppu	22	14
(India) A Pantawane	24	21
Q3	(Japan) S Uchida	15	7
2	(South Korea) Bae Y-j	21	21

Second Round
(United States) I Wang	10	9
6	(China) Liu X	21	21
(India) A Pantawane	13	5
2	(South Korea) Bae Y-j	21	21

Quarterfinals
6	(China) Liu X	21	21
2	(South Korea) Bae Y-j	7	19

== Men's doubles ==
=== Seeds ===
1. (South Korea) Lee Yong-dae / Yoo Yeon-seong (withdrew)
2. (South Korea) Kim Ki-jung / Kim Sa-rang (withdrew)
3. (Chinese Taipei) Lee Sheng-mu / Tsai Chia-hsin (first round)
4. (Indonesia) Markus Fernaldi Gideon / Markis Kido (first round)
5. (South Korea) Ko Sung-hyun / Shin Baek-cheol (second round)
6. (Indonesia) Berry Angriawan / Ricky Karanda Suwardi (first round)
7. (China) Cai Yun / Lu Kai (first round)
8. (Chinese Taipei) Liang Jui-wei / Liao Kuan-hao (first round)

=== Finals ===
Semifinals
(China) Li Junhui (China) Liu Yuchen	21	22
(Chinese Taipei) Chen Hung-ling (Chinese Taipei) Wang Chi-lin	15	20
(Japan) Hiroyuki Saeki (Japan) Ryota Taohata	24	21
(Indonesia) Andrei Adistia (Indonesia) Hendra Aprida Gunawan	26	23

Final
(China) Li Junhui (China) Liu Yuchen	14	21	16
(Indonesia) Andrei Adistia (Indonesia) Hendra Aprida Gunawan	21	16	21

=== Top half ===
==== Section 1 ====
First Round
1	(South Korea) Lee Y-d (South Korea) Yoo Y-s	wo
(Japan) Y Komatsuzaki (Japan) H Takeuchi
Q3	(Chinese Taipei) Liao M-c (Chinese Taipei) Tseng M-h	17	21	19
(South Korea) Kim D-e (South Korea) Kim D-y	21	17	21
8	(Chinese Taipei) Liang J-w (Chinese Taipei) Liao K-h	12	12
(Malaysia) Chooi KM (Malaysia) Teo EY	21	21
(China) Li JH (China) Liu YC	21	21
(Netherlands) R Bosch (Netherlands) K Ridder	16	16

Second Round
(Japan) Y Komatsuzaki (Japan) H Takeuchi	21	22	19
(South Korea) Kim D-e (South Korea) Kim D-y	18	24	21
(Malaysia) Chooi KM (Malaysia) Teo EY	19	14
(China) Li JH (China) Liu YC	21	21

Quarterfinals
(South Korea) Kim D-e (South Korea) Kim D-y	18	17
(China) Li JH (China) Liu YC	21	21

==== Section 2 ====
First Round
4	(Indonesia) M Gideon (Indonesia) M Kido	18	21	20
(Chinese Taipei) Chen H-l (Chinese Taipei) Wang C-l	21	15	22
(India) M Attri (India) S Reddy	21	21
PFQ	(India) A Francis (India) A Vishnu	17	18
5	(South Korea) Ko S-h (South Korea) Shin B-c	21	21
(Chinese Taipei) Chang K-l (Chinese Taipei) Su Y-n	7	11
(Indonesia) S Geh (Indonesia) K Sukamuljo	21	21
(Chinese Taipei) Huang P-j (Chinese Taipei) Lu C-y	18	19

Second Round
(Chinese Taipei) Chen H-l (Chinese Taipei) Wang C-l	21	21
(India) M Attri (India) S Reddy	14	14
5	(South Korea) Ko S-h (South Korea) Shin B-c	20	21	19
(Indonesia) S Geh (Indonesia) K Sukamuljo	22	11	21

Quarterfinals
(Chinese Taipei) Chen H-l (Chinese Taipei) Wang C-l	18	21	21
(Indonesia) S Geh (Indonesia) K Sukamuljo	21	15	18

=== Bottom half ===
==== Section 3 ====
First Round
Q4	(Chinese Taipei) Liu W-c (Chinese Taipei) Yang P-h	17	15
Q2	(Malaysia) Tai AK (Malaysia) Woon MC	21	21
(Japan) H Saeki (Japan) R Taohata	21	21
7	(China) Cai Y (China) Lu K	19	16
(China) Huang KX (China) Zheng SW	19	21	19
(Malaysia) Chow PC (Malaysia) Mak HC	21	16	21
(Indonesia) W Nayaka (Indonesia) A Yusuf	21	22
3	(Chinese Taipei) Lee S-m (Chinese Taipei) Tsai C-h	19	20

Second Round
Q2	(Malaysia) Tai AK (Malaysia) Woon MC	16	12
(Japan) H Saeki (Japan) R Taohata	21	21
(Malaysia) Chow PC (Malaysia) Mak HC	21	21
(Indonesia) W Nayaka (Indonesia) A Yusuf	19	12

Quarterfinals
(Japan) H Saeki (Japan) R Taohata	21	21
(Malaysia) Chow PC (Malaysia) Mak HC	16	18

==== Section 4 ====
First Round
(Chinese Taipei) Chen C-j (Chinese Taipei) Lu C-b	28	21
(Thailand) W Ampunsuwan (Thailand) P Chalardchaleam	26	17
Q1	(Thailand) W Buranakuea (Thailand) T Potieng	21	21
6	(Indonesia) B Angriawan (Indonesia) R Suwardi	18	10
(Chinese Taipei) Lin C-y (Chinese Taipei) Wu H-l	21	21
(Malaysia) J Singh (Malaysia) R Tan	12	17
(Indonesia) A Adistia (Indonesia) H Gunawan	21	19	21
PFQ	(Malaysia) N Heg (Malaysia) Low JS	17	21	3

Second Round
(Chinese Taipei) Chen C-j (Chinese Taipei) Lu C-b	15	21	12
Q1	(Thailand) W Buranakuea (Thailand) T Potieng	21	19	21
(Chinese Taipei) Lin C-y (Chinese Taipei) Wu H-l	21	16	16
(Indonesia) A Adistia (Indonesia) H Gunawan	10	21	21

Quarterfinals
Q1	(Thailand) W Buranakuea (Thailand) T Potieng	21	19	10
(Indonesia) A Adistia (Indonesia) H Gunawan	10	21	21

== Women's doubles ==
=== Seeds ===
1. (China) Wang Xiaoli / Yu Yang (final)
2. (South Korea) Jang Ye-na / Kim So-young (quarter-final)
3. (South Korea) Jung Kyung-eun / Kim Ha-na (withdrew)
4. (Indonesia) Nitya Krishinda Maheswari / Greysia Polii (champion)
5. (China) Huang Yaqiong / Tang Yuanting (semi-final)
6. (South Korea) Ko A-ra / Yoo Hae-won (quarter-final)
7. (Japan) Yuriko Miki / Koharu Yonemoto (first round)
8. (China) Ou Dongni / Yu Xiaohan (quarter-final)

=== Finals ===
Semifinals
1	(China) Wang Xiaoli (China) Yu Yang	21	21
PFQ	(Indonesia) Dian Fitriani (Indonesia) Nadya Melati	11	12
4	(Indonesia) Nitya Krishinda Maheswari (Indonesia) Greysia Polii	21	21
5	(China) Huang Yaqiong (China) Tang Yuanting	16	17

Final
1	(China) Wang Xiaoli (China) Yu Yang	18	11
4	(Indonesia) Nitya Krishinda Maheswari (Indonesia) Greysia Polii	21	21

=== Top half ===
==== Section 1 ====
First Round
1	(China) Wang XL (China) Yu Y	21	21
(Indonesia) G Imawan (Indonesia) K Istirani	14	8
PFQ	(India) P Sawant (Indonesia) M Wiranto	13	8
(Indonesia) A Awanda (Indonesia) D Haris	21	21
8	(China) Ou DN (China) Yu XH	21	21
PFQ	(Chinese Taipei) Chang C-h (Chinese Taipei) Chang H-t	14	10
(India) P Gadre (India) S Reddy	19	18
(Chinese Taipei) Cheng W-h (Chinese Taipei) Hsieh P-c	21	21

Second Round
1	(China) Wang XL (China) Yu Y	21	21
(Indonesia) A Awanda (Indonesia) D Haris	10	12
8	(China) Ou DN (China) Yu XH	21	21
(Chinese Taipei) Cheng W-h (Chinese Taipei) Hsieh P-c	18	19

Quarterfinals
1	(China) Wang XL (China) Yu Y	21	21
8	(China) Ou DN (China) Yu XH	14	11

==== Section 2 ====
First Round
PFQ	(Indonesia) D Fitriani (Indonesia) N Melati	11
(Thailand) P Muenwong (Thailand) K Ostermeyer	6^{r}
Q3	(Japan) M Matsumoto (Japan) W Nagahara	21	21
(Malaysia) Chow MK (Malaysia) Lee MY	13	14
7	(Japan) Y Miki (Japan) K Yonemoto	16	20
(South Korea) Lee S-h (South Korea) Shin S-c	21	22
(Indonesia) S Andini (Indonesia) T Nuraidah	11	21	19
(Hong Kong) Chan TK (Hong Kong) Tse YS	21	13	21

Second Round
PFQ	(Indonesia) D Fitriani (Indonesia) N Melati	21	21
Q3	(Japan) M Matsumoto (Japan) W Nagahara	10	16
(South Korea) Lee S-h (South Korea) Shin S-c	15	21	21
(Hong Kong) Chan TK (Hong Kong) Tse YS	21	16	12

Quarterfinals
PFQ	(Indonesia) D Fitriani (Indonesia) N Melati	21	21
(South Korea) Lee S-h (South Korea) Shin S-c	19	16

=== Bottom half ===
==== Section 3 ====
First Round
Q1	(Thailand) C Chaladchalam (Thailand) N Saengchote	21	23
(Chinese Taipei) Kuo Y-w (Chinese Taipei) Wang P-r	19	21
Q2	(Japan) A Higashino (Japan) C Hoshi	7	16
6	(South Korea) Ko A-r (South Korea) Yoo H-w	21	21
(Thailand) J Kittiharakul (Thailand) R Prajongjai	18	25
(Hong Kong) Chau HW (Hong Kong) Poon LY	21	27
(Japan) A Kurihara (Japan) N Shinoya	13	19
4	(Indonesia) N Maheswari (Indonesia) G Polii	21	21

Second Round
Q1	(Thailand) C Chaladchalam (Thailand) N Saengchote	15	17
6	(South Korea) Ko A-r (South Korea) Yoo H-w	21	21
(Hong Kong) Chau HW (Hong Kong) Poon LY	17	10
4	(Indonesia) N Maheswari (Indonesia) G Polii	21	21

Quarterfinals
6	(South Korea) Ko A-r (South Korea) Yoo H-w	18	16
4	(Indonesia) N Maheswari (Indonesia) G Polii	21	21

==== Section 4 ====
First Round
(Japan) M Aratama (Japan) M Taruno	21	16	11
(Malaysia) A Anscelly (Malaysia) Soong FC	11	21	21
(South Korea) Chae Y-j (South Korea) Choi H-i	17	16
5	(China) Huang YQ (China) Tang YT	21	21
Q4	(Vietnam) Nguyen TS (Vietnam) Vu TT	21	17	21
(Chinese Taipei) Chen H-h (Chinese Taipei) Lai C-w	18	21	18
(Hong Kong) Chan HY (Hong Kong) Yuen SY	15	16
2	(South Korea) Jang Y-n (South Korea) Kim S-y	21	21

Second Round
(Malaysia) A Anscelly (Malaysia) Soong FC	22	19
5	(China) Huang YQ (China) Tang YT	24	21
Q4	(Vietnam) Nguyen TS (Vietnam) Vu TT	8	14
2	(South Korea) Jang Y-n (South Korea) Kim S-y	21	21

Quarterfinals
5	(China) Huang YQ (China) Tang YT	21	21
2	(South Korea) Jang Y-n (South Korea) Kim S-y	13	17

== Mixed doubles ==
=== Seeds ===
1. (South Korea) Ko Sung-hyun / Kim Ha-na (withdrew)
2. (Hong Kong) Lee Chun Hei / Chau Hoi Wah (withdrew)
3. (Indonesia) Markis Kido / Pia Zebadiah Bernadeth (semi-final)
4. (China) Lu Kai / Huang Yaqiong (second round)
5. (South Korea) Shin Baek-cheol / Jang Ye-na (second round)
6. (South Korea) Kim Ki-jung / Kim So-young (withdrew)
7. (South Korea) Yoo Yeon-seong / Eom Hye-won (quarter-final)
8. (South Korea) Lee Yong-dae / Shin Seung-chan (withdrew)

=== Finals ===
Semifinals
(Indonesia) Alfian Eko Prasetya (Indonesia) Annisa Saufika	21	21
(Hong Kong) Chan Yun Lung (Hong Kong) Tse Ying Suet	13	16
3	(Indonesia) Markis Kido (Indonesia) Pia Zebadiah Bernadeth	17	21	20
(China) Liu Yuchen (China) Yu Xiaohan	21	19	22

Final
(Indonesia) Alfian Eko Prasetya (Indonesia) Annisa Saufika	12	14
(China) Liu Yuchen (China) Yu Xiaohan	21	21

=== Top half ===
==== Section 1 ====
First Round
PFQ	(South Korea) Bae K-y (South Korea) Yoo H-w	16	20
(Chinese Taipei) Liao M-c (Chinese Taipei) Chen H-h	21	22
(Indonesia) A Prasetya (Indonesia) A Saufika	21	21
(Hong Kong) Wong WH (Hong Kong) Chan HY	15	19
PFQ	(Japan) R Taohata (Japan) K Yonemoto	21	17	21
(Thailand) P Vilailak (Thailand) N Saengchote	15	21	14
(Malaysia) L Abdul Khalid (Malaysia) Soong FC	13	13
Q2	(Japan) Y Komatsuzaki (Japan) M Aratama	21	21

Second Round
(Chinese Taipei) Liao M-c (Chinese Taipei) Chen H-h	19	20
(Indonesia) A Prasetya (Indonesia) A Saufika	21	22
PFQ	(Japan) R Taohata (Japan) K Yonemoto	24	22
Q2	(Japan) Y Komatsuzaki (Japan) M Aratama	22	20

Quarterfinals
(Indonesia) A Prasetya (Indonesia) A Saufika	17	21	21
PFQ	(Japan) R Taohata (Japan) K Yonemoto	21	13	11

==== Section 2 ====
First Round
4	(China) Lu K (China) Huang YQ	17	21	21
(Malaysia) Ong JG (Malaysia) Lee MY	21	14	19
Q3	(Indonesia) R Alexander (Indonesia) M Oktaviani	21	21
(Malaysia) Tan AQ (Malaysia) A Anscelly	13	8
8	(South Korea) Lee Y-d (South Korea) Shin S-c	wo
(India) Su Reddy (India) P Gadre
(Hong Kong) Chan YL (Hong Kong) Tse YS	21	23
(Indonesia) E Subaktiar (Indonesia) G Widjaja	16	21

Second Round
4	(China) Lu K (China) Huang YQ	12	15
Q3	(Indonesia) R Alexander (Indonesia) M Oktaviani	21	21
(India) Su Reddy (India) P Gadre	13	19
(Hong Kong) Chan YL (Hong Kong) Tse YS	21	21

Quarterfinals
Q3	(Indonesia) R Alexander (Indonesia) M Oktaviani	13	21	13
(Hong Kong) Chan YL (Hong Kong) Tse YS	21	15	21

=== Bottom half ===
==== Section 3 ====
First Round
Q4	(India) M Attri (India) Si Reddy	19	21	21
(Hong Kong) Tang CM (Hong Kong) Chan TK	21	18	14
(Chinese Taipei) Tseng M-h (Chinese Taipei) Lai C-w	18	15
7	(South Korea) Yoo Y-s (South Korea) Eom H-w	21	21
(China) Li JH (China) Ou DN	17	21	21
(Malaysia) Wong FY (Malaysia) Chow MK	21	16	13
(South Korea) Kim D-e (South Korea) Choi H-i	14	14
3	(Indonesia) M Kido (Indonesia) P Bernadeth	21	21

Second Round
Q4	(India) M Attri (India) Si Reddy	18	20
7	(South Korea) Yoo Y-s (South Korea) Eom H-w	21	22
(China) Li JH (China) Ou DN	14	18
3	(Indonesia) M Kido (Indonesia) P Bernadeth	21	21

Quarterfinals
7	(South Korea) Yoo Y-s (South Korea) Eom H-w	16	21
3	(Indonesia) M Kido (Indonesia) P Bernadeth	21	23

==== Section 4 ====
First Round
(Thailand) W Uttamang (Thailand) C Chaladchalam	17	12
(Hong Kong) F Kurniawan (Hong Kong) Poon LY	21	21
Q1	(Indonesia) K Sukamuljo (Indonesia) G Polii	21	18	20
5	(South Korea) Shin B-c (South Korea) Jang Y-n	14	21	22
(South Korea) Kim D-y (South Korea) Chae Y-j	19	21	21
(India) A Vishnu (India) A Balan	21	19	15
(China) Liu YC (China) Yu XH	21	21
PFQ	(Malaysia) V Mawan (India) P Sawant	17	18

Second Round
(Hong Kong) F Kurniawan (Hong Kong) Poon LY	21	17	23
5	(South Korea) Shin B-c (South Korea) Jang Y-n	13	21	21
(South Korea) Kim D-y (South Korea) Chae Y-j	17	17
(China) Liu YC (China) Yu XH	21	21

Quarterfinals
(Hong Kong) F Kurniawan (Hong Kong) Poon LY	17	14
(China) Liu YC (China) Yu XH	21	21

Preceded by 2014 U.S. Open Grand Prix Gold	BWF Grand Prix Gold and Grand Prix; 2014 season	Succeeded by 2014 Russia Open Grand Prix
