= 2016 Singapore Super Series =

Tournament details
- Dates: 12 April 2016– 17 April 2016
- Edition: 67th
- Level: Super Series
- Total prize money: US$350,000
- Venue: Singapore Indoor Stadium
- Location: Kallang, Singapore

Champions
- Men's singles: (Indonesia) Sony Dwi Kuncoro
- Women's singles: (Thailand) Ratchanok Intanon
- Men's doubles: (China) Fu Haifeng (China) Zhang Nan
- Women's doubles: (Indonesia) Nitya Krishinda Maheswari (Indonesia) Greysia Polii
- Mixed doubles: (South Korea) Ko Sung-hyun (South Korea) Kim Ha-na

The 2016 Singapore Super Series was the fourth Super Series tournament of the 2016 BWF Super Series. The tournament takes place in Singapore from April 12–17, 2016 with a total purse of $350,000.

== Men's singles ==
=== Seeds ===
1. (China) Chen Long (quarterfinals)
2. (China) Lin Dan (semifinals)
3. (Japan) Kento Momota (withdrew)
4. (Denmark) Viktor Axelsen (second round)
5. (Denmark) Jan Ø. Jørgensen (first round)
6. (China) Tian Houwei (quarterfinals)
7. (Chinese Taipei) Chou Tien-chen (first round)
8. (Indonesia) Tommy Sugiarto (quarterfinals)

=== Top half ===
First Round
1	(China) Chen L	18	21	21
(India) H.S. Prannoy	21	18	19
(Thailand) B Ponsana	22	21
Q4	(Chinese Taipei) Lin Y-h	20	15
7	(Chinese Taipei) Chou T-c	9	19
(Hong Kong) Ng K L	21	21
(India) A Jayaram	17	16
(Germany) M Zwiebler	21	21
4	(Denmark) V Axelsen	21	21
(Hong Kong) Wei N	13	11
(South Korea) Son W-h	24	21
PFQ	(Thailand) T Saensomboonsuk	22	17
6	(China) Tian HW	21	21
(Japan) T Ueda	15	10
(India) S Kidambi	21	18	18
(Chinese Taipei) Hsu J-h	11	21	21

Second Round
1	(China) Chen L	17	21	21
(Thailand) B Ponsana	21	18	9
(Hong Kong) Ng K L	21	23
(Germany) M Zwiebler	15	21
4	(Denmark) V Axelsen	21	12	7
(South Korea) Son W-h	14	21	21
6	(China) Tian HW	21	19	21
(Chinese Taipei) Hsu J-h	18	21	9

Quarterfinals
1	(China) Chen L	14	18
(Hong Kong) Ng K L	21	21
(South Korea) Son W-h	11	21	21
6	(China) Tian HW	21	15	19

Semifinals
(Hong Kong) Ng K L	20	16
(South Korea) Son W-h	22	21

=== Bottom half ===
First Round
(Indonesia) A Ginting	21	11	17
Q2	(Indonesia) S D Kuncoro	9	21	21
(Japan) S Sasaki	21	22
5	(Denmark) J Ø Jørgensen	16	20
(South Korea) Lee D-k	21	23
(Hong Kong) Hu Y	13	21
(China) Wang ZM	21	21
PFQ	(France) B Leverdez	16	13
(Hong Kong) Wong W K	18	21	17
(Denmark) H-K Vittinghus	21	17	21
Q3	(Japan) K Nishimoto	12	18
8	(Indonesia) T Sugiarto	21	21
Q1	(Malaysia) Z Zulkiffli	14	16
PFQ	(Indonesia) J Christie	21	21
(Indonesia) I M Mustofa	16	19
2	(China) Lin D	21	21

Second Round
Q2	(Indonesia) S D Kuncoro	11	21	21
(Japan) S Sasaki	21	14	4
(South Korea) Lee D-k	21	11	16
(China) Wang ZM	16	21	21
(Denmark) H-K Vittinghus	14	16
8	(Indonesia) T Sugiarto	21	21
PFQ	(Indonesia) J Christie	13	7
2	(China) Lin D	21	21

Quarterfinals
Q2	(Indonesia) S D Kuncoro	24	12	21
(China) Wang ZM	22	21	16
8	(Indonesia) T Sugiarto	18	14
2	(China) Lin D	21	21

Semifinals
Q2	(Indonesia) S D Kuncoro	21	17	22
2	(China) Lin D	10	21	20

=== Finals ===
Semifinals
(Hong Kong) Ng Ka Long	20	16
(South Korea) Son Wan-ho	22	21
Q2	(Indonesia) Sony Dwi Kuncoro	21	17	22
2	(China) Lin Dan	10	21	20

Final
(South Korea) Son Wan-ho	16	21	14
Q2	(Indonesia) Sony Dwi Kuncoro	21	13	21

== Women's singles ==
=== Seeds ===
1. (Spain) Carolina Marín (quarterfinals)
2. (Japan) Nozomi Okuhara (second round)
3. (Thailand) Ratchanok Intanon (champion)
4. (India) Saina Nehwal (withdrew)
5. (China) Wang Yihan (second round)
6. (South Korea) Sung Ji-hyun (quarterfinals)
7. (Chinese Taipei) Tai Tzu-ying (first round)
8. (Japan) Akane Yamaguchi (semifinals)

=== Top half ===
First Round
1	(Spain) C Marín	21	21
(Indonesia) L Fanetri	12	9
(Thailand) N Jindapol	21	21
(Malaysia) Tee J Y	8	14
8	(Japan) A Yamaguchi	21	21
(Indonesia) M F Kusumastuti	15	11
(Canada) M Li	21	21
Q3	(Indonesia) L Al Mainaky	14	11
3	(Thailand) R Intanon	21	21
(Hong Kong) Cheung N Y	14	10
(Chinese Taipei) Hsu Y-c	21	21
(Japan) M Mitani	16	19
5	(China) Wang YH	21	21
(South Korea) Bae Y-j	15	15
(Thailand) P Buranaprasertsuk	21	21
(Japan) Y Hashimoto	17	14

Second Round
1	(Spain) C Marín	21	21
(Thailand) N Jindapol	19	15
8	(Japan) A Yamaguchi	21	19	21
(Canada) M Li	12	21	8
3	(Thailand) R Intanon	21	21
(Chinese Taipei) Hsu Y-c	19	17
5	(China) Wang YH	21	22	17
(Thailand) P Buranaprasertsuk	9	24	21

Quarterfinals
1	(Spain) C Marín	21	18	18
8	(Japan) A Yamaguchi	13	21	21
3	(Thailand) R Intanon	21	21
(Thailand) P Buranaprasertsuk	12	18

Semifinals
8	(Japan) A Yamaguchi	12	20
3	(Thailand) R Intanon	21	22

=== Bottom half ===
First Round
(India) P.V. Sindhu	9	21	21
(Thailand) B Ongbumrungpan	21	17	11
(China) He BJ	19	21	21
7	(Chinese Taipei) Tai T-y	21	17	17
(Chinese Taipei) Pai Y-p	17	21	17
(Hong Kong) Yip P Y	21	11	21
(United States) Zhang BW	21	21
PFQ	(Japan) A Ohori	18	17
(Japan) S Sato	21	21
Q1	(Singapore) Grace Chua H Z	11	11
Q2	(Chinese Taipei) Hu L-f	16	13
6	(South Korea) Sung J-h	21	21
(Singapore) Liang XY	18	4
(China) Sun Y	21	21
Q4	(Indonesia) Y Y Susanto	5	9
2	(Japan) N Okuhara	21	21

Second Round
(India) P.V. Sindhu	21	14	14
(China) He BJ	11	21	21
(Hong Kong) Yip P Y	25	16	14
(United States) Zhang BW	23	21	21
(Japan) S Sato	19	13
6	(South Korea) Sung J-h	21	21
(China) Sun Y	21	21
2	(Japan) N Okuhara	16	11

Quarterfinals
(China) He BJ	21	21
(United States) Zhang BW	16	15
6	(South Korea) Sung J-h	15	21	19
(China) Sun Y	21	19	21

Semifinals
(China) He BJ	10	16
(China) Sun Y	21	21

=== Finals ===
Semifinals
8	(Japan) Akane Yamaguchi	12	20
3	(Thailand) Ratchanok Intanon	21	22
(China) He Bingjiao	10	16
(China) Sun Yu	21	21

Final
3	(Thailand) Ratchanok Intanon	18	21	21
(China) Sun Yu	21	11	14

== Men's doubles ==
=== Seeds ===
1. (South Korea) Lee Yong-dae / Yoo Yeon-seong (semifinals)
2. (Indonesia) Mohammad Ahsan / Hendra Setiawan (quarterfinals)
3. (China) Chai Biao / Hong Wei (quarterfinals)
4. (China) Fu Haifeng / Zhang Nan (champion)
5. (Japan) Hiroyuki Endo / Kenichi Hayakawa (second round)
6. (South Korea) Kim Gi-jung / Kim Sa-rang (first round)
7. (South Korea) Ko Sung-hyun / Shin Baek-cheol (second round)
8. (China) Liu Xiaolong / Qiu Zihan (withdrew)

=== Top half ===
First Round
1	(South Korea) Lee Y-d (South Korea) Yoo Y-s	21	22
(Chinese Taipei) Lee J-h (Chinese Taipei) Lee Y	12	20
(Malaysia) Goh V S (Malaysia) Tan W K	23	21
Q1	(Philippines) P G Magnaye (Philippines) A Morada	21	5
PFQ	(Hong Kong) Chan Y L (Hong Kong) Lee C H	14	15
(Thailand) D Puavaranukroh (Thailand) K Kedren	21	21
PFQ	(Malaysia) Hoon T H (Malaysia) Teo K S	20	15
(Indonesia) A Pratama (Indonesia) R K Suwardi	22	21
4	(China) Fu HF (China) Zhang N	21	21
PFQ	(Hong Kong) Or C C (Hong Kong) Tang C M	11	19
(Thailand) B Issara (Thailand) N Puangpuapech
Q3	(Chinese Taipei) Liao K-h (Chinese Taipei) Lu C-p	w	/	o
7	(South Korea) Ko S-h (South Korea) Shin B-c	21	21
(China) Wang YL (China) Zhang W	14	19
(Indonesia) M F Gideon (Indonesia) K S Sukamuljo	21	19	21
(Chinese Taipei) Lee S-m (Chinese Taipei) Tsai C-h	17	21	14

Second Round
1	(South Korea) Lee Y-d (South Korea) Yoo Y-s	21	21
(Malaysia) Goh V S (Malaysia) Tan W K	14	13
(Thailand) D Puavaranukroh (Thailand) K Kedren	11	14
(Indonesia) A Pratama (Indonesia) R K Suwardi	21	21
4	(China) Fu HF (China) Zhang N	21	21
Q3	(Chinese Taipei) Liao K-h (Chinese Taipei) Lu C-p	16	10
7	(South Korea) Ko S-h (South Korea) Shin B-c	19	21	14
(Indonesia) M F Gideon (Indonesia) K S Sukamuljo	21	16	21

Quarterfinals
1	(South Korea) Lee Y-d (South Korea) Yoo Y-s	21	21
(Indonesia) A Pratama (Indonesia) R K Suwardi	17	16
4	(China) Fu HF (China) Zhang N	21	21
(Indonesia) M F Gideon (Indonesia) K S Sukamuljo	15	19

Semifinals
1	(South Korea) Lee Y-d (South Korea) Yoo Y-s	16	21
4	(China) Fu HF (China) Zhang N	21	23

=== Bottom half ===
First Round
Q2	(Singapore) D B Chrisnanta (Singapore) H Wijaya	21	21
Q4	(Malaysia) Tai A K (Malaysia) Yew H K	18	19
(Japan) T Kamura (Japan) K Sonoda	22	21	21
6	(South Korea) Kim G-j (South Korea) Kim S-r	24	16	14
(Indonesia) B Angriawan (Indonesia) R A Saputro	21	21
PFQ	(Egypt) A A E Khateeb (Egypt) A Kashkal	11	10
(Malaysia) Koo K K (Malaysia) Tan B H	13	15
3	(China) Chai B (China) Hong W	21	21
(China) Li JH (China) Liu YC	22	21
(Indonesia) H A Gunawan (Indonesia) M Kido	20	18
(Germany) M Fuchs (Germany) J Schöttler	21	15	23
5	(Japan) H Endo (Japan) K Hayakawa	17	21	25
(China) Liu C (China) Lu K	17	21	20
(India) P J Chopra (India) A Dewalkar	21	16	22
(Chinese Taipei) Liao M-c (Chinese Taipei) Tseng M-h	16	21	17
2	(Indonesia) M Ahsan (Indonesia) H Setiawan	21	17	21

Second Round
Q2	(Singapore) D B Chrisnanta (Singapore) H Wijaya	10	10
(Japan) T Kamura (Japan) K Sonoda	21	21
(Indonesia) B Angriawan (Indonesia) R A Saputro	21	14	11
3	(China) Chai B (China) Hong W	19	21	21
(China) Li JH (China) Liu YC	22	18	21
5	(Japan) H Endo (Japan) K Hayakawa	20	21	18
(India) P J Chopra (India) A Dewalkar	12	12
2	(Indonesia) M Ahsan (Indonesia) H Setiawan	21	21

Quarterfinals
(Japan) T Kamura (Japan) K Sonoda	21	21
3	(China) Chai B (China) Hong W	15	8
(China) Li JH (China) Liu YC	21	21
2	(Indonesia) M Ahsan (Indonesia) H Setiawan	11	11

Semifinals
(Japan) T Kamura (Japan) K Sonoda	21	21
(China) Li JH (China) Liu YC	16	17

=== Finals ===
Semifinals
1	(South Korea) Lee Yong-dae (South Korea) Yoo Yeon-seong	16	21
4	(China) Fu Haifeng (China) Zhang Nan	21	23
(Japan) Takeshi Kamura (Japan) Keigo Sonoda	21	21
(China) Li Junhui (China) Liu Yuchen	16	17

Final
4	(China) Fu Haifeng (China) Zhang Nan	21	22
(Japan) Takeshi Kamura (Japan) Keigo Sonoda	11	20

== Women's doubles ==
=== Seeds ===
1. (Japan) Misaki Matsutomo / Ayaka Takahashi (final)
2. (Indonesia) Nitya Krishinda Maheswari / Greysia Polii (champion)
3. (South Korea) Jung Kyung-eun / Shin Seung-chan (semifinals)
4. (China) Tian Qing / Zhao Yunlei (semifinals)
5. (South Korea) Chang Ye-na / Lee So-hee (second round)
6. (China) Tang Yuanting / Yu Yang (withdrew)
7. (Netherlands) Eefje Muskens / Selena Piek (withdrew)
8. (Japan) Naoko Fukuman / Kurumi Yonao (quarterfinals)

=== Top half ===
First Round
1	(Japan) M Matsutomo (Japan) A Takahashi	21	21
(Singapore) Elaine Chua Y L (Singapore) C D Sari	10	14
(Bulgaria) G Stoeva (Bulgaria) S Stoeva	w	/	o
(Chinese Taipei) Cheng C-y (Chinese Taipei) Cheng Y-c
PFQ	(Chinese Taipei) Chang H-t (Chinese Taipei) Hu L-f	21	21
Q4	(Singapore) Jin YJ (Singapore) Crystal Wong J Y	16	19
(Japan) S Matsuo (Japan) M Naito	21	21
(Indonesia) P Z Bernadeth (India) N S Reddy	7	6
4	(China) Tian Q (China) Zhao YL	21	21
(Chinese Taipei) Hsu Y-c (Chinese Taipei) Pai Y-p	15	8
Q1	BYE
Q3	(Indonesia) T R Nuraidah (Indonesia) R A Pradipta
PFQ	(Malaysia) Payee Lim P Y (Malaysia) Lim P Z	14	11
(Chinese Taipei) Hsieh P-c (Chinese Taipei) Wu T-j	21	21
(Indonesia) D D Haris (Indonesia) R E Putri Sari	21	25
(Thailand) P Supajirakul (Thailand) S Taerattanachai	19	23

Second Round
1	(Japan) M Matsutomo (Japan) A Takahashi	21	21
(Bulgaria) G Stoeva (Bulgaria) S Stoeva	16	16
PFQ	(Chinese Taipei) Chang H-t (Chinese Taipei) Hu L-f	12	14
(Japan) S Matsuo (Japan) M Naito	21	21
4	(China) Tian Q (China) Zhao YL	21	21
Q3	(Indonesia) T R Nuraidah (Indonesia) R A Pradipta	17	11
(Chinese Taipei) Hsieh P-c (Chinese Taipei) Wu T-j	12	10
(Indonesia) D D Haris (Indonesia) R E Putri Sari	21	21

Quarterfinals
1	(Japan) M Matsutomo (Japan) A Takahashi	21	21
(Japan) S Matsuo (Japan) M Naito	15	11
4	(China) Tian Q (China) Zhao YL	18	21	21
(Indonesia) D D Haris (Indonesia) R E Putri Sari	21	16	12

Semifinals
1	(Japan) M Matsutomo (Japan) A Takahashi	21	20	21
4	(China) Tian Q (China) Zhao YL	17	22	16

=== Bottom half ===
First Round
Q2	(Indonesia) N Herloardjo (Indonesia) R S Putri	3	3^{r}
(Japan) Y Fukushima (Japan) S Hirota	21	11
(Indonesia) A Rahayu (Indonesia) J F Sugiarto	7	17
8	(Japan) N Fukuman (Japan) K Yonao	21	21
(China) Huang YQ (China) Tang JH	21	21
(Thailand) C Chaladchalam (Thailand) P Muenwong	10	10
(Thailand) J Kititharakul (Thailand) R Prajongjai
3	(South Korea) Jung K-e (South Korea) Shin S-c	w	/	o
(China) Chen QC (China) Jia YF	21	21
(Indonesia) K N Hanadia (Indonesia) D T Permatasari	11	6
(Germany) I Herttrich (Germany) B Michels	12	16
5	(South Korea) Chang Y-n (South Korea) Lee S-h	21	21
(India) J Gutta (India) A Ponnappa	18	16
(South Korea) Go A-r (South Korea) Yoo H-w	21	21
(Egypt) N Ashraf (Egypt) M Eltanany	5	4
2	(Indonesia) N K Maheswari (Indonesia) G Polii	21	21

Second Round
(Japan) Y Fukushima (Japan) S Hirota	23	15
8	(Japan) N Fukuman (Japan) K Yonao	25	21
(China) Huang YQ (China) Tang JH	21	16	16
3	(South Korea) Jung K-e (South Korea) Shin S-c	14	21	21
(China) Chen QC (China) Jia YF	21	21
5	(South Korea) Chang Y-n (South Korea) Lee S-h	19	11
(South Korea) Go A-r (South Korea) Yoo H-w	14	14
2	(Indonesia) N K Maheswari (Indonesia) G Polii	21	21

Quarterfinals
8	(Japan) N Fukuman (Japan) K Yonao	12	21	19
3	(South Korea) Jung K-e (South Korea) Shin S-c	21	8	21
(China) Chen QC (China) Jia YF	19	22	12
2	(Indonesia) N K Maheswari (Indonesia) G Polii	21	20	21

Semifinals
3	(South Korea) Jung K-e (South Korea) Shin S-c	18	13
2	(Indonesia) N K Maheswari (Indonesia) G Polii	21	21

=== Finals ===
Semifinals
1	(Japan) Misaki Matsutomo (Japan) Ayaka Takahashi	21	20	21
4	(China) Tian Qing (China) Zhao Yunlei	17	22	16
3	(South Korea) Jung Kyung-eun (South Korea) Shin Seung-chan	18	13
2	(Indonesia) Nitya Krishinda Maheswari (Indonesia) Greysia Polii	21	21

Final
1	(Japan) Misaki Matsutomo (Japan) Ayaka Takahashi
2	(Indonesia) Nitya Krishinda Maheswari (Indonesia) Greysia Polii	w	/	o

== Mixed doubles ==
=== Seeds ===
1. (Indonesia) Tontowi Ahmad / Liliyana Natsir (semifinals)
2. (China) Liu Cheng / Bao Yixin (second round)
3. (South Korea) Ko Sung-hyun / Kim Ha-na (champion)
4. (China) Xu Chen / Ma Jin (final)
5. (Indonesia) Praveen Jordan / Debby Susanto (quarterfinals)
6. (England) Chris Adcock / Gabrielle Adcock (quarterfinals)
7. (Hong Kong) Lee Chun Hei / Chau Hoi Wah (first round)
8. (China) Lu Kai / Huang Yaqiong (first round)

=== Top half ===
First Round
1	(Indonesia) T Ahmad (Indonesia) L Natsir	21	21
(Japan) K Sonoda (Japan) N Fukuman	14	13
(Thailand) D Puavaranukroh (Thailand) S Taerattanachai	16	21	19
(South Korea) Lee Y-d (South Korea) Lee S-h	21	15	21
6	(England) C Adcock (England) G Adcock	21	21
Q3	(Chinese Taipei) Chang K-c (Chinese Taipei) Chang H-t	13	18
(India) A Vishnu (India) A Balan	11	17
(South Korea) Shin B-c (South Korea) Chae Y-j	21	21
3	(South Korea) Ko S-h (South Korea) Kim H-n	w	/	o
(Thailand) B Issara (Thailand) S Amitrapai
PFQ	(Chinese Taipei) Lee J-h (Chinese Taipei) Wu T-j	16	10
(Indonesia) E Subaktiar (Indonesia) G E Widjaja	21	21
8	(China) Lu K (China) Huang YQ	15	22	8
Q2	(China) Liu YC (China) Tang JH	21	20	21
(Singapore) Terry Hee Y K (Singapore) Tan W T	21	21
(South Korea) Choi S-g (South Korea) Eom H-w	19	17

Second Round
1	(Indonesia) T Ahmad (Indonesia) L Natsir	21	21
(South Korea) Lee Y-d (South Korea) Lee S-h	17	12
6	(England) C Adcock (England) G Adcock	21	21
(South Korea) Shin B-c (South Korea) Chae Y-j	17	9
3	(South Korea) Ko S-h (South Korea) Kim H-n	21	21
(Indonesia) E Subaktiar (Indonesia) G E Widjaja	18	15
Q2	(China) Liu YC (China) Tang JH	21	22
(Singapore) Terry Hee Y K (Singapore) Tan W T	16	20

Quarterfinals
1	(Indonesia) T Ahmad (Indonesia) L Natsir	21	21
6	(England) C Adcock (England) G Adcock	15	15
3	(South Korea) Ko S-h (South Korea) Kim H-n	21	12	24
Q2	(China) Liu YC (China) Tang JH	13	21	22

Semifinals
1	(Indonesia) T Ahmad (Indonesia) L Natsir	14	16
3	(South Korea) Ko S-h (South Korea) Kim H-n	21	21

=== Bottom half ===
First Round
(South Korea) Kim G-j (South Korea) Shin S-c	17	17
Q4	(South Korea) Yoo Y-s (South Korea) Chang Y-n	21	21
(Germany) M Fuchs (Germany) B Michels	17	16
5	(Indonesia) P Jordan (Indonesia) D Susanto	21	21
Q1	(India) P J Chopra (India) N S Reddy	21	21
(Indonesia) I Fadhilah (Indonesia) W Anggraini	15	17
(Hong Kong) Chan Y L (Hong Kong) Tse Y S	16	16
4	(China) Xu C (China) Ma J	21	21
(Netherlands) J Arends (Netherlands) S Piek	21	21
(Singapore) D B Chrisnanta (Singapore) Vanessa Neo Y Y	12	13
(China) Wang YL (China) Chen QC	23	21
7	(Hong Kong) Lee C H (Hong Kong) Chau H W	21	13
(Japan) K Kazuno (Japan) A Kurihara	19	21	21
(Indonesia) M Kido (Indonesia) P Z Bernadeth	21	7	12
(Chinese Taipei) Liao M-c (Chinese Taipei) Chen H-h	12	22	19
2	(China) Liu C (China) Bao YX	21	20	21

Second Round
Q4	(South Korea) Yoo Y-s (South Korea) Chang Y-n	21	18	20
5	(Indonesia) P Jordan (Indonesia) D Susanto	17	21	22
Q1	(India) P J Chopra (India) N S Reddy	15	19
4	(China) Xu C (China) Ma J	21	21
(Netherlands) J Arends (Netherlands) S Piek	15	23	15
(China) Wang YL (China) Chen QC	21	21	21
(Japan) K Kazuno (Japan) A Kurihara	19	21	21
2	(China) Liu C (China) Bao YX	21	16	18

Quarterfinals
5	(Indonesia) P Jordan (Indonesia) D Susanto	17	18
4	(China) Xu C (China) Ma J	21	21
(China) Wang YL (China) Chen QC	20	21	21
(Japan) K Kazuno (Japan) A Kurihara	22	7	14

Semifinals
4	(China) Xu C (China) Ma J	21	23
(China) Wang YL (China) Chen QC	13	21

=== Finals ===
Semifinals
1	(Indonesia) Tontowi Ahmad (Indonesia) Liliyana Natsir	14	16
3	(South Korea) Ko Sung-hyun (South Korea) Kim Ha-na	21	21
4	(China) Xu Chen (China) Ma Jin	21	23
(China) Wang Yilu (China) Chen Qingchen	13	21

Final
3	(South Korea) Ko Sung-hyun (South Korea) Kim Ha-na	21	21
4	(China) Xu Chen (China) Ma Jin	17	14

Preceded by 2015 Singapore Super Series	Singapore Open	Succeeded by 2017 Singapore Super Series
Preceded by 2016 Malaysia Super Series Premier	BWF Super Series; 2016 BWF Season	Succeeded by 2016 Indonesia Super Series Premier
