= 2017 Singapore Super Series =

Tournament details
- Dates: 11 April 2017– 16 April 2017
- Edition: 68th
- Level: Super Series
- Total prize money: US$350,000
- Venue: Singapore Indoor Stadium
- Location: Kallang, Singapore

Champions
- Men's singles: (India) B. Sai Praneeth
- Women's singles: (Chinese Taipei) Tai Tzu-ying
- Men's doubles: (Denmark) Mathias Boe (Denmark) Carsten Mogensen
- Women's doubles: (Denmark) Kamilla Rytter Juhl (Denmark) Christinna Pedersen
- Mixed doubles: (China) Lu Kai (China) Huang Yaqiong

The 2017 Singapore Super Series was the fourth Super Series tournament of the 2017 BWF Super Series. The tournament takes place in Singapore from April 11–16, 2017 with a total purse of $350,000.

== Men's singles ==
=== Seeds ===
1. (Denmark) Jan Ø. Jørgensen (withdrew)
2. (China) Chen Long (withdrew)
3. (Denmark) Viktor Axelsen (first round)
4. (South Korea) Son Wan-ho (second round)
5. (China) Shi Yuqi (quarterfinals)
6. (Chinese Taipei) Chou Tien-chen (first round)
7. (Hong Kong) Ng Ka Long (second round)
8. (Thailand) Tanongsak Saensomboonsuk (quarterfinals)

=== Top half ===
First Round
PFQ	(Denmark) E Holst	21	7	19
(India) B. S Praneeth	17	21	21
(China) Qiao B	21	21
(Denmark) H-K Vittinghus	12	17
8	(Thailand) T Saensomboonsuk	21	21
Q3	(Malaysia) Chong W F	18	18
(Hong Kong) Hu Y	28	23
(India) S Verma	26	21
4	(South Korea) Son W-h	21	14	21
Q1	(South Korea) Heo K-h	13	21	16
(Indonesia) J Christie	21	21
(Germany) M Zwiebler	18	13
7	(Hong Kong) Ng K L	21	21
(Indonesia) T Sugiarto	19	17
(South Korea) Lee D-k	19	21	21
(Indonesia) S D Kuncoro	21	15	18

Second Round
(India) B. S Praneeth	21	21	21
(China) Qiao B	15	23	16
8	(Thailand) T Saensomboonsuk	21	23
(Hong Kong) Hu Y	17	21
4	(South Korea) Son W-h	15	18
(Indonesia) J Christie	21	21
7	(Hong Kong) Ng K L	21	12	18
(South Korea) Lee D-k	14	21	21

Quarterfinals
(India) B. S Praneeth	15	21	21
8	(Thailand) T Saensomboonsuk	21	14	19
(Indonesia) J Christie	18	16
(South Korea) Lee D-k	21	21

Semifinals
(India) B. S Praneeth	21	21
(South Korea) Lee D-k	6	8

=== Bottom half ===
First Round
Q2	(India) S Varma	15	14
(Indonesia) A S Ginting	21	21
(France) B Leverdez	17	21	21
6	(Chinese Taipei) Chou T-c	21	13	17
(Chinese Taipei) Hsu J-h	13	15
(Malaysia) Z Zulkiffli	21	21
(Hong Kong) Wong W K	21	21
3	(Denmark) V Axelsen	15	15
(Hong Kong) Wei N	27	17	14
(Spain) P Abian	25	21	21
(India) A Jayaram	16	7
5	(China) Shi YQ	21	21
(India) S Kidambi	21	21
Q4	(Japan) K Nishimoto	12	11
(Chinese Taipei) Wang T-w	18	21	13
PFQ	(Indonesia) I M Mustofa	21	15	21

Second Round
(Indonesia) A S Ginting	21	21
(France) B Leverdez	18	13
(Malaysia) Z Zulkiffli	16	10
(Hong Kong) Wong W K	21	21
(Spain) P Abian	10	16
5	(China) Shi YQ	21	21
(India) S Kidambi	18	21	22
PFQ	(Indonesia) I M Mustofa	21	19	20

Quarterfinals
(Indonesia) A S Ginting	21	21
(Hong Kong) Wong W K	19	14
5	(China) Shi YQ	14	16
(India) S Kidambi	21	21

Semifinals
(Indonesia) A S Ginting	13	14
(India) S Kidambi	21	21

=== Finals ===
Semifinals
(India) B. Sai Praneeth	21	21
(South Korea) Lee Dong-keun	6	8
(Indonesia) Anthony Sinisuka Ginting	13	14
(India) Srikanth Kidambi	21	21

Final
(India) B. Sai Praneeth	17	21	21
(India) Srikanth Kidambi	21	17	12

== Women's singles ==
=== Seeds ===
1. (Chinese Taipei) Tai Tzu-ying (champion)
2. (South Korea) Sung Ji-hyun (semifinals)
3. (Japan) Akane Yamaguchi (quarterfinals)
4. (Spain) Carolina Marín (final)
5. (India) P. V. Sindhu (quarterfinals)
6. (China) Sun Yu (quarterfinals)
7. (Thailand) Ratchanok Intanon (first round)
8. (China) He Bingjiao (second round)

=== Top half ===
First Round
1	(Chinese Taipei) Tai T-y	21	21
(Thailand) N Jindapol	10	19
(Indonesia) H Ramadini	15	14
(Chinese Taipei) Chiang M-h	21	21
7	(Thailand) R Intanon	8	18
(Japan) S Sato	21	21
Q4	(Singapore) Yeo J M	15	17
PFQ	(South Korea) Kim H-m	21	21
3	(Japan) A Yamaguchi	21	23
(Hong Kong) Cheung N Y	16	21
PFQ	(India) R Das	18	13
(Chinese Taipei) Hsu Y-c	21	21
8	(China) He BJ	21	7	21
Q2	(Chinese Taipei) Chen S-y	9	21	8
(United States) B Zhang	21	19	21
Q1	(Indonesia) F Angguni	10	21	8

Second Round
1	(Chinese Taipei) Tai T-y	21	21
(Chinese Taipei) Chiang M-h	11	8
(Japan) S Sato	21	21
PFQ	(South Korea) Kim H-m	16	10
3	(Japan) A Yamaguchi	21	16	23
(Chinese Taipei) Hsu Y-c	19	21	21
8	(China) He BJ	10	23
(United States) B Zhang	21	25

Quarterfinals
1	(Chinese Taipei) Tai T-y	21	21
(Japan) S Sato	14	19
3	(Japan) A Yamaguchi	15	23	19
(United States) B Zhang	21	21	21

Semifinals
1	(Chinese Taipei) Tai T-y	21	21
(United States) B Zhang	19	15

=== Bottom half ===
First Round
(Indonesia) Fitriani	15	24	21
(Japan) M Mitani	21	22	17
(Japan) N Okuhara	21	15	20
5	(India) P. V. Sindhu	10	21	22
Q3	(Indonesia) Y Y Susanto	18	10
(Chinese Taipei) Lee C-h	21	21
(Thailand) P Chochuwong	12	21	12
4	(Spain) C Marin	21	16	21
(Thailand) B Ongbamrungphan	8	21	17
(China) Chen YF	21	6	21
(Indonesia) D D Ayustine	11	10
6	(China) Sun Y	21	21
(Chinese Taipei) Pai Y-p	21	16	21
(Hong Kong) Yip P Y	18	21	16
(Malaysia) Goh J W	16	21	13
2	(South Korea) Sung J-h	21	19	21

Second Round
(Indonesia) Fitriani	21	17	8
5	(India) P. V. Sindhu	19	21	21
(Chinese Taipei) Lee C-h	7	11
4	(Spain) C Marin	21	21
(China) Chen YF	21	13	14
6	(China) Sun Y	19	21	21
(Chinese Taipei) Pai Y-p	11	16
2	(South Korea) Sung J-h	21	21

Quarterfinals
5	(India) P. V. Sindhu	11	15
4	(Spain) C Marin	21	21
6	(China) Sun Y	13	16
2	(South Korea) Sung J-h	21	21

Semifinals
4	(Spain) C Marin	21	21
2	(South Korea) Sung J-h	9	12

=== Finals ===
Semifinals
1	(Chinese Taipei) Tai Tzu-ying	21	21
(United States) Beiwen Zhang	19	15
4	(Spain) Carolina Marín	21	21
2	(South Korea) Sung Ji-hyun	9	12

Final
1	(Chinese Taipei) Tai Tzu-ying	21	21
4	(Spain) Carolina Marín	15	15

== Men's doubles ==
=== Seeds ===
1. (Indonesia) Marcus Fernaldi Gideon / Kevin Sanjaya Sukamuljo (semifinals)
2. (Malaysia) Goh V Shem / Tan Wee Kiong (quarterfinals)
3. (Japan) Takeshi Kamura / Keigo Sonoda (quarterfinals)
4. (China) Li Junhui / Liu Yuchen (final)
5. (Denmark) Mathias Boe / Carsten Mogensen (champion)
6. (China) Chai Biao / Hong Wei (withdrew)
7. (Denmark) Mads Conrad-Petersen / Mads Pieler Kolding (first round)
8. (Indonesia) Angga Pratama / Ricky Karanda Suwardi (quarterfinals)

=== Top half ===
First Round
1	(Indonesia) M F Gideon (Indonesia) K S Sukamuljo	21	21
Q1	(South Korea) Choi S-g (South Korea) Kim G-j	11	18
(Hong Kong) Or C C (Hong Kong) Tang C M	12	21	15
(Japan) T Hoki (Japan) Y Kobayashi	21	17	21
7	(Denmark) M Conrad-Petersen (Denmark) M Pieler Kolding	3^{r}
(Chinese Taipei) Lee J-h (Chinese Taipei) Lee Y	1
Q4	(Indonesia) L A Nugroho (Indonesia) T Supriadi	23	13	21
PFQ	(Singapore) Terry Hee Y K (Singapore) Loh K H	21	21	19
3	(Japan) T Kamura (Japan) K Sonoda	21	21
(India) M Attri (India) B. S Reddy	8	16
(Indonesia) F Alfian (Indonesia) M R Ardianto	21	21
(China) Liu C (China) Zhang N	18	19
5	(Denmark) M Boe (Denmark) C Mogensen	21	21
(Indonesia) H A Gunawan (Indonesia) M Kido	15	18
(Thailand) B Isara (Thailand) N Puangpuapech	21	21
(Singapore) D B Chrisnanta (Singapore) H Wijaya	14	18

Second Round
1	(Indonesia) M F Gideon (Indonesia) K S Sukamuljo	21	21
(Japan) T Hoki (Japan) Y Kobayashi	12	15
(Chinese Taipei) Lee J-h (Chinese Taipei) Lee Y	21	21
Q4	(Indonesia) L A Nugroho (Indonesia) T Supriadi	12	15
3	(Japan) T Kamura (Japan) K Sonoda	11	21	21
(Indonesia) F Alfian (Indonesia) M R Ardianto	21	16	10
5	(Denmark) M Boe (Denmark) C Mogensen	24	21
(Thailand) B Isara (Thailand) N Puangpuapech	22	13

Quarterfinals
1	(Indonesia) M F Gideon (Indonesia) K S Sukamuljo	21	21
(Chinese Taipei) Lee J-h (Chinese Taipei) Lee Y	16	14
3	(Japan) T Kamura (Japan) K Sonoda	14	12
5	(Denmark) M Boe (Denmark) C Mogensen	21	21

Semifinals
1	(Indonesia) M F Gideon (Indonesia) K S Sukamuljo	21	11	14
5	(Denmark) M Boe (Denmark) C Mogensen	11	21	21

=== Bottom half ===
First Round
(Hong Kong) Law C H (Hong Kong) Lee C H	19	21	21
(Australia) M Chau (Australia) S Serasinghe	21	17	16
(Chinese Taipei) Chen H-l (Chinese Taipei) Wang C-l	21	19	14
8	(Indonesia) R K Suwardi (Indonesia) A Pratama	19	21	21
(Malaysia) Ong Y S (Malaysia) Teo E Y	21	21
Q2	(India) Arjun M.R. (India) R Shlok	17	17
(Indonesia) M Ahsan (Indonesia) R A Saputro	13	15
4	(China) Li JH (China) Liu YC	21	21
(Chinese Taipei) Lu C-y (Chinese Taipei) Yang P-h	21	19	22
(Japan) H Endo (Japan) Y Watanabe	15	21	20
(Indonesia) B Angriawan (Indonesia) Hardianto	21	21
PFQ	(Chinese Taipei) Liao K-h (Chinese Taipei) Lu C-p	17	16
Q3	(Indonesia) H Setiawan (Malaysia) Tan B H	21	21
(Thailand) K Kedren (Thailand) D Puavaranukroh	14	19
(Chinese Taipei) Lee S-m (Chinese Taipei) Tsai C-h	22	15	18
2	(Malaysia) Goh V S (Malaysia) Tan W K	20	21	21

Second Round
(Hong Kong) Law C H (Hong Kong) Lee C H	18	21	16
8	(Indonesia) R K Suwardi (Indonesia) A Pratama	21	19	21
(Malaysia) Ong Y S (Malaysia) Teo E Y	20	21	16
4	(China) Li JH (China) Liu YC	22	18	21
(Chinese Taipei) Lu C-y (Chinese Taipei) Yang P-h	19	16
(Indonesia) B Angriawan (Indonesia) Hardianto	21	21
Q3	(Indonesia) H Setiawan (Malaysia) Tan B H	19	18
2	(Malaysia) Goh V S (Malaysia) Tan W K	21	21

Quarterfinals
8	(Indonesia) R K Suwardi (Indonesia) A Pratama	21	20	20
4	(China) Li JH (China) Liu YC	18	22	22
(Indonesia) B Angriawan (Indonesia) Hardianto	21	21
2	(Malaysia) Goh V S (Malaysia) Tan W K	15	15

Semifinals
4	(China) Li JH (China) Liu YC	15	21	21
(Indonesia) B Angriawan (Indonesia) Hardianto	21	10	16

=== Finals ===
Semifinals
1	(Indonesia) Marcus Fernaldi Gideon (Indonesia) Kevin Sanjaya Sukamuljo	21	11	14
5	(Denmark) Mathias Boe (Denmark) Carsten Mogensen	11	21	21
4	(China) Li Junhui (China) Liu Yuchen	15	21	21
(Indonesia) Berry Angriawan (Indonesia) Hardianto	21	10	16

Final
5	(Denmark) Mathias Boe (Denmark) Carsten Mogensen	21	21
4	(China) Li Junhui (China) Liu Yuchen	13	14

== Women's doubles ==
=== Seeds ===
1. (Japan) Misaki Matsutomo / Ayaka Takahashi (final)
2. (Denmark) Kamilla Rytter Juhl / Christinna Pedersen (champion)
3. (South Korea) Jung Kyung-eun / Shin Seung-chan (semifinals)
4. (South Korea) Chang Ye-na / Lee So-hee (semifinals)
5. (China) Chen Qingchen / Jia Yifan (quarterfinals)
6. (Japan) Naoko Fukuman / Kurumi Yonao (quarterfinals)
7. (Thailand) Jongkolphan Kititharakul / Rawinda Prajongjai (second round)
8. (Thailand) Puttita Supajirakul / Sapsiree Taerattanachai (quarterfinals)

=== Top half ===
First Round
1	(Japan) M Matsutomo (Japan) A Takahashi	21	21
(India) S Santosh (India) A S Sunil	11	8
(Malaysia) Lim Y L (Malaysia) Yap C W	19	19
(India) A Ponnappa (India) N. S Reddy	21	21
7	(Thailand) J Kititharakul (Thailand) R Prajongjai	21	21
(Chinese Taipei) Chiang K-h (Chinese Taipei) Hung S-h	9	16
(Thailand) C Chaladchalam (Thailand) P Muenwong	17	21	21
(Indonesia) D D Haris (Indonesia) R E Putri Sari	21	18	15
3	(South Korea) Jung K-e (South Korea) Shin S-c	21	21
PFQ	(India) M Jakkampudi (India) P S Ram	14	6
Q4	(Chinese Taipei) Lin X-m (Chinese Taipei) Wu F-c	21	21
(Singapore) P S Dewi Citra (Singapore) Jin Y J	9	12
5	(China) Chen QC (China) Jia YF	21	21
(Indonesia) D Fitriani (Indonesia) N Melati	17	11
(South Korea) Chae Y-j (South Korea) Kim H-n	11	21	19
(Japan) S Tanaka (Japan) K Yonemoto	21	16	21

Second Round
1	(Japan) M Matsutomo (Japan) A Takahashi	21	19	21
(India) A Ponnappa (India) N. S Reddy	11	21	12
7	(Thailand) J Kititharakul (Thailand) R Prajongjai	17	17
(Thailand) C Chaladchalam (Thailand) P Muenwong	21	21
3	(South Korea) Jung K-e (South Korea) Shin S-c	21	21
Q4	(Chinese Taipei) Lin X-m (Chinese Taipei) Wu F-c	13	17
5	(China) Chen QC (China) Jia YF	21	21	21
(Japan) S Tanaka (Japan) K Yonemoto	23	11	17

Quarterfinals
1	(Japan) M Matsutomo (Japan) A Takahashi	21	21
(Thailand) C Chaladchalam (Thailand) P Muenwong	14	11
3	(South Korea) Jung K-e (South Korea) Shin S-c	11	21	21
5	(China) Chen QC (China) Jia YF	21	19	19

Semifinals
1	(Japan) M Matsutomo (Japan) A Takahashi	21	21
3	(South Korea) Jung K-e (South Korea) Shin S-c	17	17

=== Bottom half ===
First Round
(Malaysia) Chow M K (Malaysia) Lee M Y	19	21	20
(Indonesia) A S Awanda (Indonesia) N K M Istirani	21	14	22
(Indonesia) K N Hanadia (Indonesia) D T Permatasari	13	9
8	(Thailand) P Supajirakul (Thailand) S Taerattanachai	21	21
(Chinese Taipei) Hsu Y-c (Chinese Taipei) Wu T-j	20	21	21
(Malaysia) Vivian Hoo K M (Malaysia) Woon K W	22	18	12
(Japan) Y Fukushima (Japan) S Hirota	21	17
4	(South Korea) Chang Y-n (South Korea) Lee S-h	23	21
Q1	(Indonesia) N R Ersa (Indonesia) Z M R Permata	11	5
Q3	(Hong Kong) Ng T Y (Hong Kong) Yeung N T	21	21
(Hong Kong) Poon L Y (Hong Kong) Tse Y S	18	18
6	(Japan) N Fukuman (Japan) K Yonao	21	21
Q2	(China) Bao YX (China) Yu XH	21	21
(Australia) S Mapasa (Australia) G Somerville	12	17
(China) Huang DP (China) Li YH	18	11
2	(Denmark) K Rytter Juhl (Denmark) C Pedersen	21	21

Second Round
(Indonesia) A S Awanda (Indonesia) N K M Istirani	15	14
8	(Thailand) P Supajirakul (Thailand) S Taerattanachai	21	21
(Chinese Taipei) Hsu Y-c (Chinese Taipei) Wu T-j	12	9
4	(South Korea) Chang Y-n (South Korea) Lee S-h	21	21
Q3	(Hong Kong) Ng T Y (Hong Kong) Yeung N T	12	20
6	(Japan) N Fukuman (Japan) K Yonao	21	22
Q2	(China) Bao YX (China) Yu XH	13	16
2	(Denmark) K Rytter Juhl (Denmark) C Pedersen	21	21

Quarterfinals
8	(Thailand) P Supajirakul (Thailand) S Taerattanachai	12	13
4	(South Korea) Chang Y-n (South Korea) Lee S-h	21	21
6	(Japan) N Fukuman (Japan) K Yonao	19	11
2	(Denmark) K Rytter Juhl (Denmark) C Pedersen	21	21

Semifinals
4	(South Korea) Chang Y-n (South Korea) Lee S-h	26	11
2	(Denmark) K Rytter Juhl (Denmark) C Pedersen	28	21

=== Finals ===
Semifinals
1	(Japan) Misaki Matsutomo (Japan) Ayaka Takahashi	21	21
3	(South Korea) Jung Kyung-eun (South Korea) Shin Seung-chan	17	17
4	(South Korea) Chang Ye-na (South Korea) Lee So-hee	26	11
2	(Denmark) Kamilla Rytter Juhl (Denmark) Christinna Pedersen	28	21

Final
1	(Japan) Misaki Matsutomo (Japan) Ayaka Takahashi	18	21	15
2	(Denmark) Kamilla Rytter Juhl (Denmark) Christinna Pedersen	21	14	21

== Mixed doubles ==
=== Seeds ===
1. (China) Zheng Siwei / Chen Qingchen (withdrew)
2. (Indonesia) Tontowi Ahmad / Liliyana Natsir (first round)
3. (China) Lu Kai / Huang Yaqiong (champion)
4. (Denmark) Joachim Fischer Nielsen / Christinna Pedersen (quarterfinals)
5. (China) Zhang Nan / Li Yinhui (first round)
6. (Malaysia) Chan Peng Soon / Goh Liu Ying (withdrew)
7. (Indonesia) Praveen Jordan / Debby Susanto (quarterfinals)
8. (Malaysia) Tan Kian Meng / Lai Pei Jing (semifinals)

=== Top half ===
First Round
PFQ	(Chinese Taipei) Wang C-l (Chinese Taipei) Lee C-h	21	21
(Chinese Taipei) Lin C-y (Chinese Taipei) Wu T-j	16	14
Q3	(Japan) Y Kobayashi (Japan) M Matsutomo	25	21
(Thailand) N Puangpuapech (Thailand) J Kititharakul	23	11
5	(China) Zhang N (China) Li YH	17	9
(South Korea) Kim G-j (South Korea) Shin S-c	21	21
(Chinese Taipei) Lu C-y (Chinese Taipei) Chiang K-h	21	16	21
Q1	(India) S Rankireddy (India) K. Maneesha	13	21	11
3	(China) Lu K (China) Huang YQ	21	21
(Japan) K Kazuno (Japan) A Kurihara	14	17
(Singapore) Terry Hee Y K (Singapore) Tan W H	21	22
(Indonesia) R Alexander (Indonesia) M D Oktavianti	19	20
PFQ	(India) B. S Reddy (India) A Ponnappa	21	21
PFQ	(India) V G Prasad (India) J Dewangan	13	14
(Japan) Y Watanabe (Japan) A Higashino	21	12	13
Q4	(South Korea) Kim J-h (South Korea) Lee S-h	15	21	21

Second Round
PFQ	(Chinese Taipei) Wang C-l (Chinese Taipei) Lee C-h	21	21
Q3	(Japan) Y Kobayashi (Japan) M Matsutomo	16	15
(South Korea) Kim G-j (South Korea) Shin S-c	21	21
(Chinese Taipei) Lu C-y (Chinese Taipei) Chiang K-h	18	14
3	(China) Lu K (China) Huang YQ	17	21	22
(Singapore) Terry Hee Y K (Singapore) Tan W H	21	16	20
PFQ	(India) B. S Reddy (India) A Ponnappa	17	21	21
Q4	(South Korea) Kim J-h (South Korea) Lee S-h	21	17	16

Quarterfinals
PFQ	(Chinese Taipei) Wang C-l (Chinese Taipei) Lee C-h	13	11
(South Korea) Kim G-j (South Korea) Shin S-c	21	21
3	(China) Lu K (China) Huang YQ	21	21
PFQ	(India) B. S Reddy (India) A Ponnappa	11	8

Semifinals
(South Korea) Kim G-j (South Korea) Shin S-c	21	17	13
3	(China) Lu K (China) Huang YQ	16	21	21

=== Bottom half ===
First Round
(Malaysia) Y Khrishnan (India) P Sawant	15	12
(Hong Kong) Tam C H (Hong Kong) Ng T Y	21	21
(Thailand) B Isara (Thailand) S Amitrapai	18	16
8	(Malaysia) Tan K M (Malaysia) Lai P J	21	21
(Chinese Taipei) Lee Y (Chinese Taipei) Hsu Y-c	16	21	21
(Indonesia) A E Prasetya (Indonesia) A Saufika	21	11	13
(Hong Kong) Lee C H (Hong Kong) Chau H W	9	14
4	(Denmark) J Fischer Nielsen (Denmark) C Pedersen	21	21
(South Korea) Choi S-g (South Korea) Chae Y-j	21	15	21
(Hong Kong) Tang C M (Hong Kong) Tse Y S	18	21	16
Q2	(Malaysia) M A Abdul Latif (Indonesia) R A Riodingin	15	20
7	(Indonesia) P Jordan (Indonesia) D Susanto	21	22
(Australia) S Serasinghe (Australia) S Mapasa	18	21	20
PFQ	(Indonesia) I Fadhilah (Indonesia) W Anggraini	21	14	22
(Thailand) D Puavaranukroh (Thailand) S Taerattanachai	21	21
2	(Indonesia) T Ahmad (Indonesia) L Natsir	14	16

Second Round
(Hong Kong) Tam C H (Hong Kong) Ng T Y	17	13
8	(Malaysia) Tan K M (Malaysia) Lai P J	21	21
(Chinese Taipei) Lee Y (Chinese Taipei) Hsu Y-c	15	19
4	(Denmark) J Fischer Nielsen (Denmark) C Pedersen	21	21
(South Korea) Choi S-g (South Korea) Chae Y-j	14	21	10
7	(Indonesia) P Jordan (Indonesia) D Susanto	21	12	21
PFQ	(Indonesia) I Fadhilah (Indonesia) W Anggraini	11	28	14
(Thailand) D Puavaranukroh (Thailand) S Taerattanachai	21	26	21

Quarterfinals
8	(Malaysia) Tan K M (Malaysia) Lai P J	10	21	21
4	(Denmark) J Fischer Nielsen (Denmark) C Pedersen	21	18	18
7	(Indonesia) P Jordan (Indonesia) D Susanto	17	13
(Thailand) D Puavaranukroh (Thailand) S Taerattanachai	21	21

Semifinals
8	(Malaysia) Tan K M (Malaysia) Lai P J	21	11	14
(Thailand) D Puavaranukroh (Thailand) S Taerattanachai	18	21	21

=== Finals ===
Semifinals
(South Korea) Kim Gi-jung (South Korea) Shin Seung-chan	21	17	12
3	(China) Lu Kai (China) Huang Yaqiong	16	21	21
8	(Malaysia) Tan Kian Meng (Malaysia) Lai Pei Jing	21	11	14
(Thailand) Dechapol Puavaranukroh (Thailand) Sapsiree Taerattanachai	18	21	21

Final
3	(China) Lu Kai (China) Huang Yaqiong	19	21	21
(Thailand) Dechapol Puavaranukroh (Thailand) Sapsiree Taerattanachai	21	16	11

Preceded by 2016 Singapore Super Series	Singapore Open	Succeeded by 2018 Singapore Open
Preceded by 2017 Malaysia Super Series Premier	BWF Super Series; 2017 BWF Season	Succeeded by 2017 Indonesia Super Series Premier
