= Ihsan Maulana Mustofa =

Indonesian badminton player (born 1995)

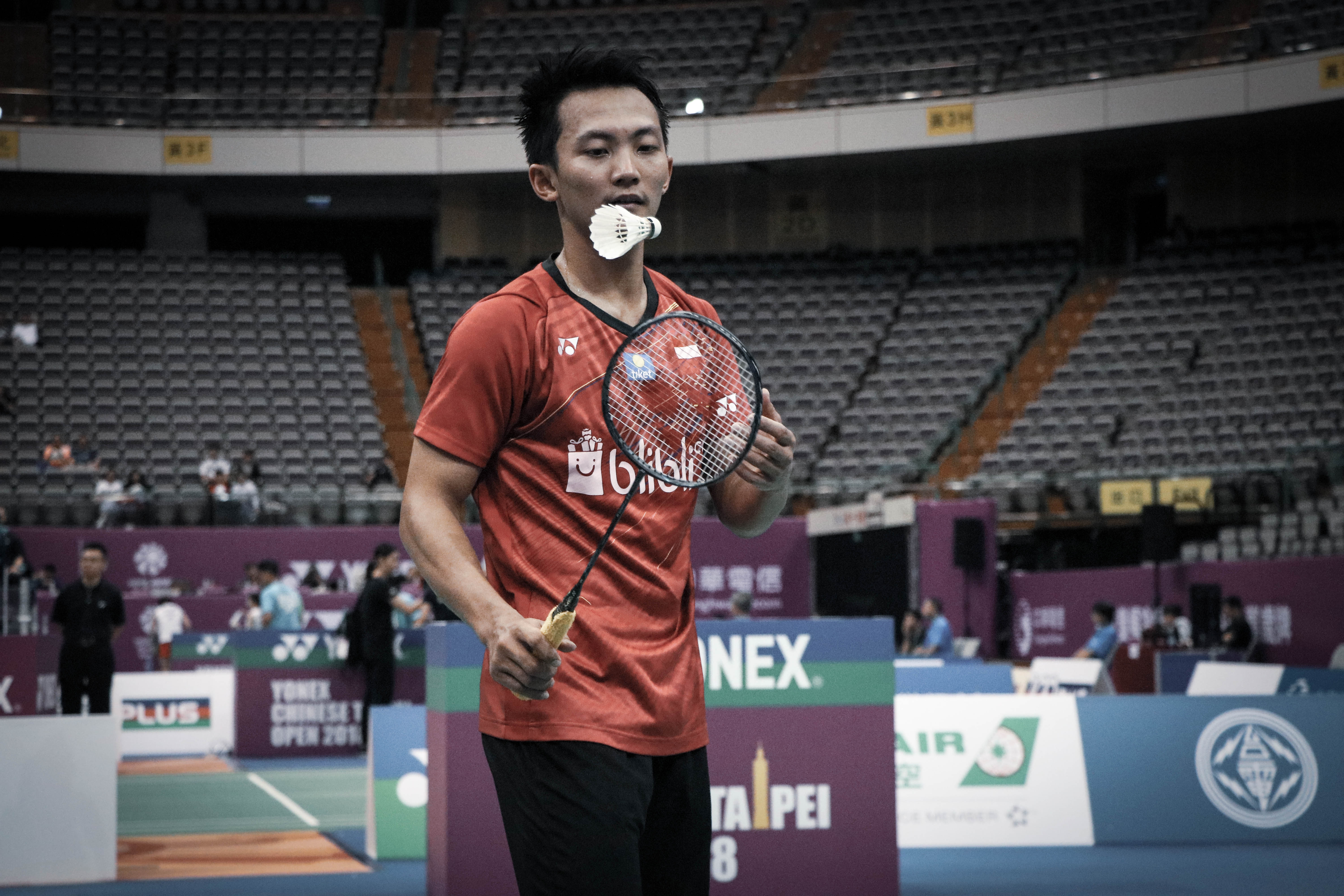

Personal information
- Born: 18 November 1995 (age 30) Tasikmalaya, West Java, Indonesia
- Height: 1.72 m (5 ft 8 in)
- Weight: 62 kg (137 lb)

Sport
- Country: Indonesia
- Sport: Badminton
- Handedness: Right

Men's singles
- Highest ranking: 17 (15 September 2016)
- BWF profile
Medal record
Men's badminton
Representing Indonesia
Sudirman Cup
Bronze medal – third place	2015 Dongguan	Mixed team
Thomas Cup
Silver medal – second place	2016 Kunshan	Men's team
Bronze medal – third place	2014 New Delhi	Men's team
Bronze medal – third place	2018 Bangkok	Men's team
Asian Games
Silver medal – second place	2018 Jakarta–Palembang	Men's team
Asia Mixed Team Championships
Bronze medal – third place	2019 Hong Kong	Mixed team
Asia Team Championships
Gold medal – first place	2016 Hyderabad	Men's team
Gold medal – first place	2018 Alor Setar	Men's team
SEA Games
Gold medal – first place	2015 Singapore	Men's team
Gold medal – first place	2017 Kuala Lumpur	Men's team
Bronze medal – third place	2017 Kuala Lumpur	Men's singles
World Junior Championships
Silver medal – second place	2013 Bangkok	Mixed team
Bronze medal – third place	2013 Bangkok	Boys' singles
Asian Junior Championships
Bronze medal – third place	2013 Kota Kinabalu	Mixed team

Ihsan Maulana Mustofa (born 18 November 1995) is an Indonesian badminton player who plays in singles event. He is from PB. Djarum, a badminton club in Kudus, Central Java and has joined the club since 2010. He was a boys' singles bronze medalist of the 2013 World Junior Championships that was held in Bangkok, Thailand. He played in the decisive matches for Indonesia to win the team event at the 2015 and 2017 SEA Games.

== Career ==
=== 2012 ===
Mustofa was the national junior champion in 2012.

=== 2013 ===
Mustofa was qualified to participate at the 2013 Badminton Asia Championships but his participation just got to the first round after being defeated by Park Sung-min with a rubber games 21–17, 20–22, 10–21. He also played in some international challenge tournaments and BWF Grand Prix such as Vietnam Open and Indonesian Grand Prix Gold. He reached the second round in both BWF Grand Prix tournaments. In the second round, he was stopped by fellow Indonesian shuttlers. He was upset by Jonatan Christie at the 2013 Vietnam Open with a rubber games and by his senior Dionysius Hayom Rumbaka at the 2013 Indonesian Grand Prix Gold with a straight games. In November 2013, he brought home a bronze medal during the 2013 BWF World Junior Championships in Bangkok, Thailand after being defeated by South Korean shuttler Heo Kwang-hee with a rubber games 18–21, 21–13, 16–21 in the semifinals.

=== 2014 ===
Mustofa was selected to join the national team as the youngest player in the Thomas Cup squad; after the Indonesian Badminton Association, quarantined 33 Thomas and Uber Cups candidates at the Djarum Badminton Club in Kudus, Central Java, for a simulation last March 2014. Mustofa defeated Sony Dwi Kuncoro, the 2004 Athens Olympics bronze medalist and the former world number four, with a stunning 21–19, 21–18 performance, catching the coaching staffs' attention. He, in 18-year-old, was dubbed 'the next big thing' by a top badminton official, is part of the Indonesian team that left for New Delhi for the Thomas Cup 2014. He also participated in some international challenge and BWF Grand Prix tournaments. He played at the 2014 German Open and the 2014 Chinese Taipei Open. His best performance in the international individual competitions was when he became the runner-up of the 2014 Dutch Open, beaten by Ajay Jayaram of India with 11–10, 6–11, 7–11, 11–1, 9–11 in the final.

=== 2015 ===
Mustofa was part of the Indonesian team that left for Dongguan, China for the 2015 Sudirman Cup, which the Indonesia team won the bronze medal at that world mixed team tournament. At the 28th SEA Games 2015 in Singapore, Mustofa helped the Indonesian men's team beating Thailand 3–2 to bring home a gold medal in the final game after he defeated Suppanyu Avihingsanon from Thailand with 20–22, 21–16, 21–9.

=== 2017 ===
Mustofa participated in both team and individual event at 29th SEA Games 2017. He helped the Indonesian men's team retaining the gold medal, beating the Malaysian Lee Zi Jia 21–11, 21–11. He also grabbed the bronze medal in individual event, beaten by Thailand's Khosit Phetpradab in straight game 10–21, 21–23.

=== 2018 ===
In 2018, Mustofa won the BWF Tour Super 100 Bangka Belitung Indonesia Masters. In the final, he beat Lin Yu-hsien of Chinese Taipei in straight games.

=== 2019 ===
At the end of 2019, Mustofa announced his resignation from the national team through his Instagram account in October 2019.

== Awards and nominations ==
Award	Year	Category	Result	Ref.
Golden Award SIWO PWI	2019	Favorite Team with 2018 Asian Games Men's Badminton Team	Nominated	

== Achievements ==
=== SEA Games ===
Men's singles
Year	Venue	Opponent	Score	Result	Ref.
2017	Axiata Arena; Kuala Lumpur, Malaysia	(Thailand) Khosit Phetpradab	10–21, 21–23	Bronze	

=== BWF World Junior Championships ===
Boys' singles
Year	Venue	Opponent	Score	Result	Ref.
2013	Hua Mark Indoor Stadium; Bangkok, Thailand	(South Korea) Heo Kwang-hee	18–21, 21–13, 16–21	Bronze	

=== BWF World Tour (1 title, 1 runner-up) ===
The BWF World Tour, which was announced on 19 March 2017 and implemented in 2018, is a series of elite badminton tournaments sanctioned by the Badminton World Federation (BWF). The BWF World Tours are divided into levels of World Tour Finals, Super 1000, Super 750, Super 500, Super 300 (part of the HSBC World Tour), and the BWF Tour Super 100.

Men's singles
Year	Tournament	Level	Opponent	Score	Result	Ref.
2018	Akita Masters	Super 100	(Thailand) Sitthikom Thammasin	10–21, 13–21	(silver) Runner-up	
2018	Indonesia Masters	Super 100	(Chinese Taipei) Lin Yu-hsien	21–17, 23–21	(gold) Winner	

=== BWF Grand Prix (3 runners-up) ===
The BWF Grand Prix had two levels, the Grand Prix and Grand Prix Gold. It was a series of badminton tournaments sanctioned by the Badminton World Federation (BWF) and played between 2007 and 2017.

Men's singles
Year	Tournament	Opponent	Score	Result	Ref.
2014	Dutch Open	(India) Ajay Jayaram	11–10, 6–11, 7–11, 11–1, 9–11	(silver) Runner-up	
2015	Thailand Open	(South Korea) Lee Hyun-il	17–21, 24–22, 8–21	(silver) Runner-up	
2017	Macau Open	(Japan) Kento Momota	16–21, 10–21	(silver) Runner-up	

BWF Grand Prix Gold tournament
BWF Grand Prix tournament

== Participation at Indonesian team ==
- 3 times at Thomas Cup (2014, 2016, 2018)
- 2 times at Sudirman Cup (2015, 2017)
- 2 times at Asian Games (2014, 2018)
- 2 times at SEA Games (2015, 2017)

== Performance timeline ==
Key

W	Won	F	Finalist	SF	Semi-finalist
QF	Quarter-finalist	#R	Rounds 4, 3, 2, 1	RR	Round-robin stage
Q#	Qualification round	A	Absent	w/d	Withdrew
G	Gold	S	Silver	B	Bronze
NH	Not held	N/A	Not applicable	DNQ	Did not qualify

=== National team ===
- Junior level

Team events	2013
Asian Junior Championships	B
World Junior Championships	S

- Senior level

Team events	2014	2015	2016	2017	2018	2019
SEA Games	NH	G	NH	G	NH	A
Asia Team Championships	NH		G	NH	G	NH
Asia Mixed Team Championships	NH			A	NH	B
Asian Games	QF	NH			S	NH
Thomas Cup	B	NH	S	NH	B	NH
Sudirman Cup	NH	B	NH	RR	NH	A

=== Individual competitions ===
- Junior level

Events	2013
Asian Junior Championships	QF
World Junior Championships	B'

- Senior level

Events	2013	2014	2015	2016	2017	2018
SEA Games	A	NH	A	NH	B	NH
Asian Championships	1R	A		1R	2R	1R
Asian Games	NH	R16	NH			A

Tournament	BWF Superseries / Grand Prix								BWF World Tour				Best
Tournament	2010	2011	2012	2013	2014	2015	2016	2017	2018	2019	2020	2021	Best
Thailand Masters	NH						A	3R	QF	1R	A	NH	QF ('18)
Swiss Open	A					1R	A	QF	A		NH	A	QF ('15)
German Open	A				1R	A					NH		1R ('14)
All England Open	A						Q2	Q2	A				Q2 ('16, '17)
Lingshui China Masters	NH				N/A				3R	3R	NH		3R ('18, '19)
Malaysia Masters	A					3R	1R	3R	2R	A		NH	3R ('15, '17)
New Zealand Open	NH	N/A	NH	A			3R	w/d	A	1R	NH		3R ('16)
Australian Open	N/A	A					1R	A			NH		1R ('16)
Spain Masters	N/A								A			1R	1R ('21)
Malaysia Open	A						1R	A		1R	NH		1R ('16, '19)
Singapore Open	A						1R	2R	QF	Q1	NH		QF ('18)
Korea Masters	A					1R	A	3R	QF	A	NH		QF ('18)
Thailand Open	NH	A			NH	F	1R	w/d	1R	Q1	A	NH	F ('15)
Russian Open	A									SF	NH		SF ('19)
Akita Masters	NH								F	2R	NH		F ('18)
Hyderabad Open	NH								A	2R	NH		2R ('19)
Korea Open	A					2R	A		1R	A	NH		2R ('15)
Chinese Taipei Open	A				2R	3R	A		1R	1R	NH		3R ('15)
Vietnam Open	A			2R	A	1R	A	2R	A		NH		2R ('13, '17)
Japan Open	A					QF	A				NH		QF ('15)
Indonesia Masters Super 100	NH								W	2R	NH		W ('18)
Dutch Open	A				F	A					NH	NA	F ('14)
French Open	A						1R	A			NH	A	1R ('16)
Bitburger Open	A						3R	A					3R ('16)
Macau Open	A					SF	1R	F	A		NH		F ('17)
Hong Kong Open	A					1R	1R	A	1R	A	NH		1R ('15, '16, '18)
Indonesia Masters	1R	1R	1R	2R	A	3R	QF	NH	1R	A			QF ('16)
Indonesia Open	A					Q2	SF	Q1	A		NH	A	SF ('16)
Chinese Taipei Masters	NH					SF	A	NH					SF ('15)
Year-end ranking	486	513	489	199	128	31	39	47	39	97	110	110	17
Tournament	2010	2011	2012	2013	2014	2015	2016	2017	2018	2019	2020	2021	Best

== Record against selected opponents ==
Head to head (H2H) against World Superseries finalists, World Championships semifinalists, and Olympic quarterfinalists.

- (China) Lin Dan 1–4
- (China) Shi Yuqi 0–1
- (China) Tian Houwei 0–3
- (China) Wang Zhengming 0–1
- (Chinese Taipei) Chou Tien-chen 0–1
- (Denmark) Hans-Kristian Vittinghus 0–1
- (Denmark) Jan Ø. Jørgensen 0–1
- (Germany) Marc Zwiebler 2–0
- (Hong Kong) Hu Yun 1–0
- (Hong Kong) Ng Ka Long 0–2
- (Indonesia) Anthony Sinisuka Ginting 1–1
- (Indonesia) Jonatan Christie 1–3
- (Indonesia) Simon Santoso 0–1
- (Indonesia) Tommy Sugiarto 0–1
- (India) Ajay Jayaram 0–1
- (India) Sameer Verma 0–1
- (India) Srikanth Kidambi 1–1
- (Japan) Kazumasa Sakai 1–0
- (Japan) Kenichi Tago 2–0
- (Japan) Kenta Nishimoto 2–0
- (Japan) Kento Momota 0–2
- (South Korea) Jeon Hyeok-jin 1–0
- (South Korea) Lee Hyun-il 0–2
- (South Korea) Son Wan-ho 2–0
- (Malaysia) Lee Chong Wei 0–1
- (Malaysia) Liew Daren 0–1
- (Thailand) Tanongsak Saensomboonsuk 1–1
