= Badminton at the 2014 Asian Games – Men's team =

Men's team at the 2014 Asian Games
- Venue: Gyeyang Gymnasium
- Dates: 20–23 September
- Competitors: 100 from 12 nations

Medalists
gold medal	South Korea; Jeon Hyeok-jin, Kim Gi-jung, Kim Sa-rang, Ko Sung-hyun, Lee Dong-keun, Lee Hyun-il, Lee Yong-dae, Shin Baek-cheol, Son Wan-ho, Yoo Yeon-seong
silver medal	China; Cai Yun, Chen Long, Fu Haifeng, Gao Huan, Lin Dan, Liu Xiaolong, Qiu Zihan, Tian Houwei, Xu Chen, Zhang Nan
bronze medal	Malaysia; Chan Peng Soon, Chong Wei Feng, Goh Soon Huat, Goh V Shem, Hoon Thien How, Lee Chong Wei, Lim Khim Wah, Tan Boon Heong, Tan Wee Kiong, Iskandar Zulkarnain Zainuddin
bronze medal	Chinese Taipei; Chen Hung-ling, Chou Tien-chen, Hsu Jen-hao, Hsueh Hsuan-yi, Lee Sheng-mu, Liang Jui-wei, Liao Kuan-hao, Liao Min-chun, Tsai Chia-hsin, Tseng Min-hao

The badminton men's team tournament at the 2014 Asian Games in Incheon took place from 20 September to 23 September at Gyeyang Gymnasium.

A total of ten countries entered the competition.

The final of the 2014 Incheon Asian Games on 23 September was a repeat of the Guangzhou Asian Games, with the South Korea men's team meeting China. In the end, South Korean players defeated their Chinese rivals and gained their third Asian Games men's title.

World No 2 seed Chen Long lost to seventh-ranked Son Wan-ho of South Korea 5–21, 24–22, 14–21 to hand the host a 1–0 lead in the best-of-five series. Korean doubles team made it 2–0. Five-time champion Lin Dan, eased past Lee Dong-keun of South Korea in the third, critical match. China won the second doubles match but Korea went to win the series 3–2. The bronze medal went to Malaysia and Chinese Taipei.

== Schedule ==
All times are Korea Standard Time (UTC+09:00)

Date	Time	Event
Saturday, 20 September 2014	13:00	Round of 16
Sunday, 21 September 2014	12:00	Quarterfinals
Monday, 22 September 2014	12:00	Semifinals
Tuesday, 23 September 2014	18:30	Gold medal match

== Results ==
Round of 16
Hong Kong	3
Maldives	0
Macau	0
Nepal	3
South Korea	3
India	0
Thailand	0
Chinese Taipei	3

Quarterfinals
1	China	3
Hong Kong	0
3	Malaysia	3
Nepal	0
South Korea	3
4	Japan	2
Chinese Taipei	3
2	Indonesia	1

Semifinals
1	China	3
3	Malaysia	0
South Korea	3
Chinese Taipei	0

Gold medal match
1	China	2
South Korea	3

=== Round of 16 ===
20 September	Hong Kong	3–0	Maldives

Hu Yun	2–0	Mohamed Ajfan Rasheed	21–10, 21–14
Wei Nan	2–0	Nasheeu Sharafuddeen	21–9, 21–16
Chan Yan Kit	2–0	Mohamed Sharim	21–6, 21–8

20 September	Macau	0–3	Nepal

Wan Wai Chi	0–2	Ratnajit Tamang	12–21, 16–21
Iek U Ieong	0–2	Bikash Shrestha	11–21, 16–21
Lou Hok Man	1–2	Sajan Krishna Tamrakar	21–12, 4–21, 18–21

20 September	South Korea	3–0	India

Son Wan-ho	2–0	Srikanth Kidambi	21–14, 21–8
Yoo Yeon-seong / Lee Yong-dae	2–0	B. Sumeeth Reddy / Manu Attri	21–12, 21–9
Lee Hyun-il	2–1	Parupalli Kashyap	6–21, 21–14, 21–10

20 September	Thailand	0–3	Chinese Taipei

Boonsak Ponsana	0–2	Chou Tien-chen	16–21, 12–21
Maneepong Jongjit / Nipitphon Phuangphuapet	1–2	Tsai Chia-hsin / Lee Sheng-mu	21–16, 15–21, 14–21
Tanongsak Saensomboonsuk	0–2	Hsu Jen-hao	15–21, 14–21

=== Quarterfinals ===
21 September	China	3–0	Hong Kong

Chen Long	2–0	Wei Nan	21–17, 22–20
Liu Xiaolong / Qiu Zihan	2–1	Lee Chun Hei / Tang Chun Man	24–22, 24–26, 21–11
Lin Dan	2–0	Wong Wing Ki	21–8, 21–15

21 September	Malaysia	3–0	Nepal

Lee Chong Wei	2–0	Ratnajit Tamang	21–10, 21–12
Chong Wei Feng	2–0	Bikash Shrestha	21–10, 21–13
Iskandar Zulkarnain Zainuddin	2–0	Sajan Krishna Tamrakar	21–3, 21–4

21 September	South Korea	3–2	Japan

Son Wan-ho	2–1	Kenichi Tago	12–21, 21–11, 21–16
Yoo Yeon-seong / Lee Yong-dae	2–1	Hiroyuki Endo / Kenichi Hayakawa	15–21, 21–14, 21–13
Lee Dong-keun	1–2	Kento Momota	21–12, 12–21, 17–21
Ko Sung-hyun / Shin Baek-cheol	0–2	Takeshi Kamura / Keigo Sonoda	16–21, 15–21
Lee Hyun-il	2–1	Takuma Ueda	14–21, 21–18, 21–9

21 September	Chinese Taipei	3–1	Indonesia

Chou Tien-chen	2–1	Tommy Sugiarto	13–21, 21–19, 21–14
Tsai Chia-hsin / Lee Sheng-mu	0–2	Hendra Setiawan / Mohammad Ahsan	19–21, 18–21
Hsu Jen-hao	2–0	Jonatan Christie	21–15, 21–17
Chen Hung-ling / Liao Min-chun	2–0	Angga Pratama / Rian Agung Saputro	21–17, 21–18

=== Semifinals ===
22 September	China	3–0	Malaysia

Chen Long	2–1	Lee Chong Wei	21–17, 19–21, 21–11
Xu Chen / Zhang Nan	2–1	Tan Boon Heong / Hoon Thien How	14–21, 21–15, 21–10
Lin Dan	2–0	Chong Wei Feng	21–11, 21–12

22 September	South Korea	3–0	Chinese Taipei

Son Wan-ho	2–0	Chou Tien-chen	21–12, 21–17
Yoo Yeon-seong / Lee Yong-dae	2–0	Tsai Chia-hsin / Lee Sheng-mu	21–10, 21–13
Lee Dong-keun	2–0	Hsu Jen-hao	21–12, 21–18

=== Gold medal match ===
23 September	China	2–3	South Korea

Chen Long	1–2	Son Wan-ho	5–21, 24–22, 14–21
Xu Chen / Zhang Nan	0–2	Yoo Yeon-seong / Lee Yong-dae	21–23, 13–21
Lin Dan	2–0	Lee Dong-keun	21–18, 21–15
Cai Yun / Fu Haifeng	2–1	Kim Sa-rang / Kim Gi-jung	19–21, 21–18, 21–16
Gao Huan	0–2	Lee Hyun-il	14–21, 18–21

== Non-participating athletes ==
- Tian Houwei (CHN)
- Chan Yun Lung (HKG)
- Law Cheuk Him (HKG)
- Ng Ka Long (HKG)
- Wong Wai Hong (HKG)
- Tontowi Ahmad (INA)
- Praveen Jordan (INA)
- Ihsan Maulana Mustofa (INA)
- Pranav Chopra (IND)
- Akshay Dewalkar (IND)
- Gurusai Dutt (IND)
- Sourabh Verma (IND)
- Hirokatsu Hashimoto (JPN)
- Noriyasu Hirata (JPN)
- Sho Sasaki (JPN)
- Jeon Hyeok-jin (KOR)
- Tai Kin Hei (MAC)
- Wong Chi Chong (MAC)
- Chan Peng Soon (MAS)
- Goh Soon Huat (MAS)
- Goh V Shem (MAS)
- Lim Khim Wah (MAS)
- Tan Wee Kiong (MAS)
- Hassan Afsheen Shaheem (MDV)
- Bishnu Katuwal (NEP)
- Wannawat Ampunsuwan (THA)
- Suppanyu Avihingsanon (THA)
- Patiphat Chalardchaleam (THA)
- Khosit Phetpradab (THA)
- Sudket Prapakamol (THA)
- Sitthikom Thammasin (THA)
- Hsueh Hsuan-yi (TPE)
- Liang Jui-wei (TPE)
- Liao Kuan-hao (TPE)
- Tseng Min-hao (TPE)
