= Su Ching-heng =

Taiwanese badminton player

Su Ching-heng 蘇敬恒
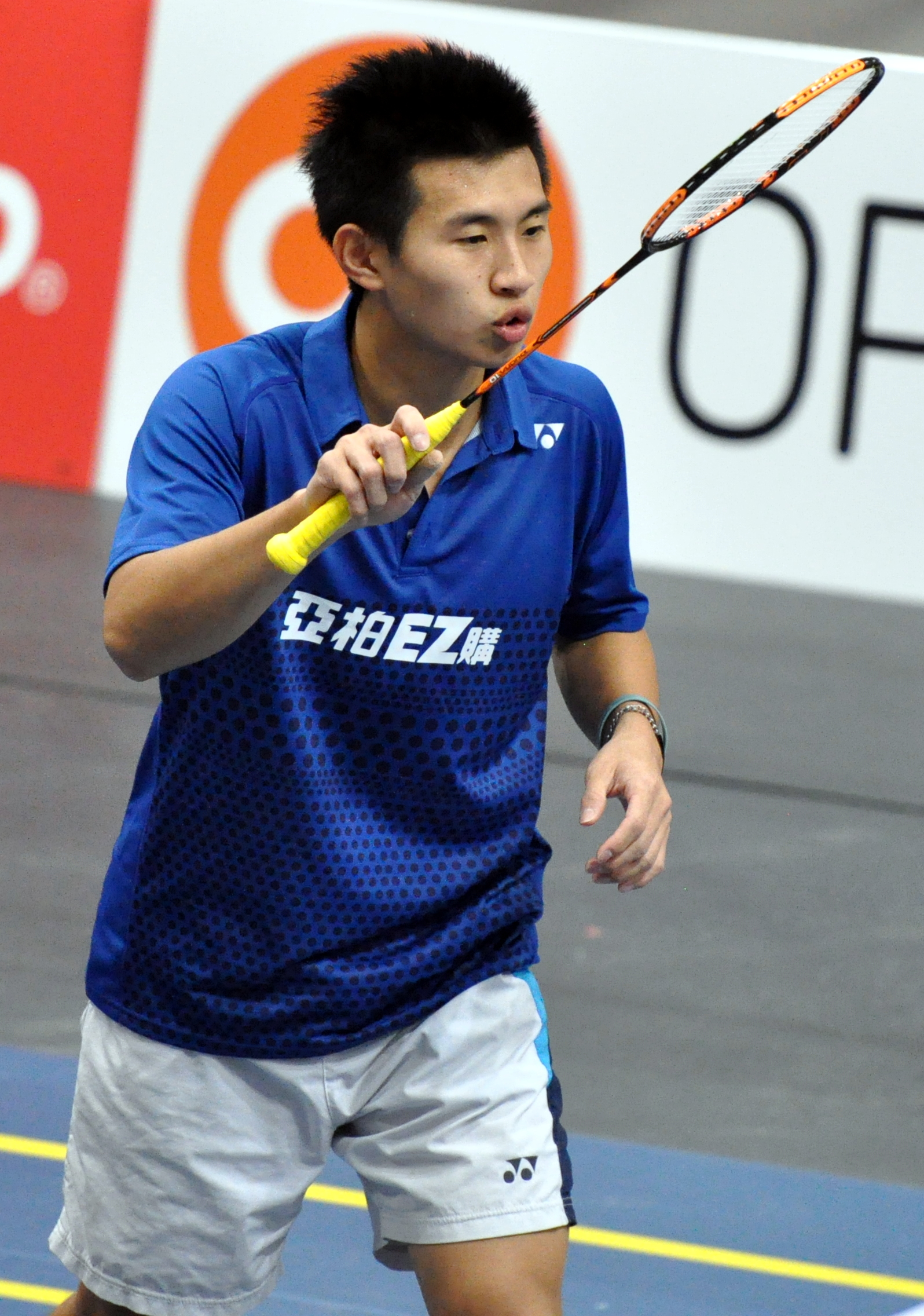
- Su in 2017

Personal information
- Born: 10 November 1992 (age 34) Taipei, Taiwan
- Years active: 2013–present
- Height: 1.68 m (5 ft 6 in)

Sport
- Country: Republic of China (Taiwan)
- Sport: Badminton
- Handedness: Right

Men's doubles
- Highest ranking: 10 (with Liao Min-chun, 19 July 2018)
- Current ranking: 284 (with Tang Kai-wei); 75 (with Wu Guan-xun) (30 June 2026)
- BWF profile

Su Ching-heng (traditional Chinese: 蘇敬恒; simplified Chinese: 苏敬恒; pinyin: Sū Jìnghéng; born 10 November 1992) is a Taiwanese badminton player. Teamed-up with Liao Min-chun in the men's doubles, they won the International Challenge title at the 2016 Welsh International tournament. In 2017, they also won Orleans, and Finnish Open tournament.

== Achievements ==
=== BWF World Tour (1 title, 4 runners-up) ===
The BWF World Tour, which was announced on 19 March 2017 and implemented in 2018, is a series of elite badminton tournaments sanctioned by the Badminton World Federation (BWF). The BWF World Tour is divided into levels of World Tour Finals, Super 1000, Super 750, Super 500, Super 300, and the BWF Tour Super 100.

Men's doubles
Year	Tournament	Level	Partner	Opponent	Score	Result	Ref.
2018	Chinese Taipei Open	Super 300	(Chinese Taipei) Liao Min-chun	(Chinese Taipei) Chen Hung-ling (Chinese Taipei) Wang Chi-lin	20–22, 9–21	(silver) Runner-up	
2023	Thailand Masters	Super 300	(Chinese Taipei) Ye Hong-wei	(Indonesia) Leo Rolly Carnando (Indonesia) Daniel Marthin	16–21, 17–21	(silver) Runner-up	
2023	Guwahati Masters	Super 100	(Chinese Taipei) Lin Bing-wei	(Malaysia) Choong Hon Jian (Malaysia) Muhammad Haikal	17–21, 21–23	(silver) Runner-up	
2023	Odisha Masters	Super 100	(Chinese Taipei) Lin Bing-wei	(India) Krishna Prasad Garaga (India) Sai Pratheek K.	20–22, 21–18, 21–17	(gold) Winner	
2025	Kaohsiung Masters	Super 100	(Chinese Taipei) Wu Guan-xun	(Japan) Kakeru Kumagai (Japan) Hiroki Nishi	18–21, 17–21	(silver) Runner-up	

=== BWF Grand Prix (1 title, 1 runner-up) ===
The BWF Grand Prix had two levels, the Grand Prix and Grand Prix Gold. It was a series of badminton tournaments sanctioned by the Badminton World Federation (BWF) and played between 2007 and 2017.

Men's doubles
Year	Tournament	Partner	Opponent	Score	Result
2017	Vietnam Open	(Chinese Taipei) Liao Min-chun	(Indonesia) Wahyu Nayaka (Indonesia) Ade Yusuf Santoso	21–12, 16–21, 21–23	(silver) Runner-up
2017	Dutch Open	(Chinese Taipei) Liao Min-chun	(Japan) Takuto Inoue (Japan) Yuki Kaneko	24–22, 21–18	(gold) Winner

BWF Grand Prix Gold tournament
BWF Grand Prix tournament

=== BWF International Challenge/Series (7 titles, 5 runners-up) ===
Men's doubles
Year	Tournament	Partner	Opponent	Score	Result
2013	Bangladesh International	(Chinese Taipei) Hung Ying-yuan	(Chinese Taipei) Liang Jui-wei (Chinese Taipei) Liao Kuan-hao	13–21, 14–21	(silver) Runner-up
2016	Waikato International	(Chinese Taipei) Yang Po-hsuan	(Chinese Taipei) Liu Wei-chen (Chinese Taipei) Yang Po-han	20–22, 10–21	(silver) Runner-up
2016	Welsh International	(Chinese Taipei) Liao Min-chun	(Chinese Taipei) Liao Kuan-hao (Chinese Taipei) Lu Chia-pin	21–19, 21–13	(gold) Winner
2016	Irish Open	(Chinese Taipei) Liao Min-chun	(Germany) Jones Ralfy Jansen (Germany) Josche Zurwonne	25–27, 21–23	(silver) Runner-up
2017	Orléans International	(Chinese Taipei) Liao Min-chun	(Indonesia) Kenas Adi Haryanto (Indonesia) Muhammad Reza Pahlevi Isfahani	21–12, 14–21, 21–17	(gold) Winner
2017	Finnish Open	(Chinese Taipei) Liao Min-chun	(Japan) Kohei Gondo (Japan) Tatsuya Watanabe	21–16, 21–16	(gold) Winner
2022	Portugal International	(Chinese Taipei) Ye Hong-wei	(Chinese Taipei) Wei Chun-wei (Chinese Taipei) Wu Guan-xun	21–13, 21–14	(gold) Winner
2022	Polish Open	(Chinese Taipei) Ye Hong-wei	(Denmark) Rasmus Kjær (Denmark) Frederik Søgaard	16–21, 21–17, 19–21	(silver) Runner-up
2022	Italian International	(Chinese Taipei) Ye Hong-wei	(South Korea) Kim Jae-hwan (South Korea) Yoon Dae-il	14–21, 19–21	(silver) Runner-up
2022	Nantes International	(Chinese Taipei) Ye Hong-wei	(Thailand) Chaloempon Charoenkitamorn (Thailand) Nanthakarn Yordphaisong	19–21, 21–17, 21–16	(gold) Winner
2025	Polish Open	(Chinese Taipei) Wu Guan-xun	(England) Rory Easton (England) Alex Green	18–21, 21–11, 21–18	(gold) Winner
2025	North Harbour International	(Chinese Taipei) Wu Guan-xun	(Chinese Taipei) Chen Zhi-ray (Chinese Taipei) Lin Yu-chieh	21–13, 18–21, 21–18	(gold) Winner

BWF International Challenge tournament
BWF International Series tournament
BWF Future Series tournament
