= Liang Jui-wei =

Taiwanese badminton player (born 1990)

Liang Jui-wei 梁瑞伟
Personal information
- Born: 29 May 1990 (age 36)
- Height: 1.78 m (5 ft 10 in)
- Weight: 78 kg (172 lb)

Sport
- Country: Taiwan
- Sport: Badminton
- Coached by: Zhang Zhengxiong

Men's & mixed doubles
- Highest ranking: 21 (MD) 16 January 2014; 170 (XD) 3 December 2015
- BWF profile
Medal record
Men's badminton
Representing Chinese Taipei
Asian Games
Bronze medal – third place	2014 Incheon	Men's team
East Asian Games
Bronze medal – third place	2013 Tianjin	Men's team

Liang Jui-wei (Chinese: 梁瑞伟; pinyin: Liáng Ruìwěi; born 22 September 1990) is a Taiwanese badminton player from Land Bank team. He was educated at the Jinwen University of Science and Technology majoring in Hotel Management Department. In 2014, he competed at the Incheon Asian Games.

== Achievements ==
=== BWF Grand Prix (1 title, 1 runner-up) ===
The BWF Grand Prix has two level such as Grand Prix and Grand Prix Gold. It is a series of badminton tournaments, sanctioned by Badminton World Federation (BWF) since 2007.

Men's Doubles
Year	Tournament	Partner	Opponent	Score	Result
2014	Canada Open	(Chinese Taipei) Lu Chia-pin	(Chinese Taipei) Liao Min-chun (Chinese Taipei) Tseng Min-hao	21–18, 16–21, 21–16	(gold) Winner
2013	U.S. Open	(Chinese Taipei) Liao Kuan-hao	(Japan) Takeshi Kamura (Japan) Keigo Sonoda	16–21, 25–27	(silver) Runner-up

BWF Grand Prix Gold tournament
BWF Grand Prix tournament

=== BWF International Challenge/Series (3 titles, 2 runners-up) ===
Men's Doubles
Year	Tournament	Partner	Opponent	Score	Result
2014	Austrian International	(Chinese Taipei) Liao Kuan-hao	(Chinese Taipei) Chen Hung-ling (Chinese Taipei) Lu Chia-pin	21–16, 12–21, 13–21	(silver) Runner-up
2014	Iran Fajr International	(Chinese Taipei) Liao Kuan-hao	(Chinese Taipei) Chen Hung-ling (Chinese Taipei) Lu Chia-pin	17–21, 18–21	(silver) Runner-up
2013	Bangladesh International	(Chinese Taipei) Liao Kuan-hao	(Chinese Taipei) Hung Ying-yuan (Chinese Taipei) Su Cheng-heng	21–13, 21–14	(gold) Winner
2012	Singapore International	(Chinese Taipei) Liao Kuan-hao	(Chinese Taipei) Liao Chun-chieh (Chinese Taipei) Lin Yen-jui	21–11, 21–15	(gold) Winner
2011	Bulgarian International	(Chinese Taipei) Liao Kuan-hao	(Chinese Taipei) Huang Po-yi (Chinese Taipei) Lu Chia-bin	21–11, 22–20	(gold) Winner

BWF International Challenge tournament
BWF International Series tournament
