= Liao Min-chun =

Taiwanese badminton player

Liao Min-chun 廖敏竣
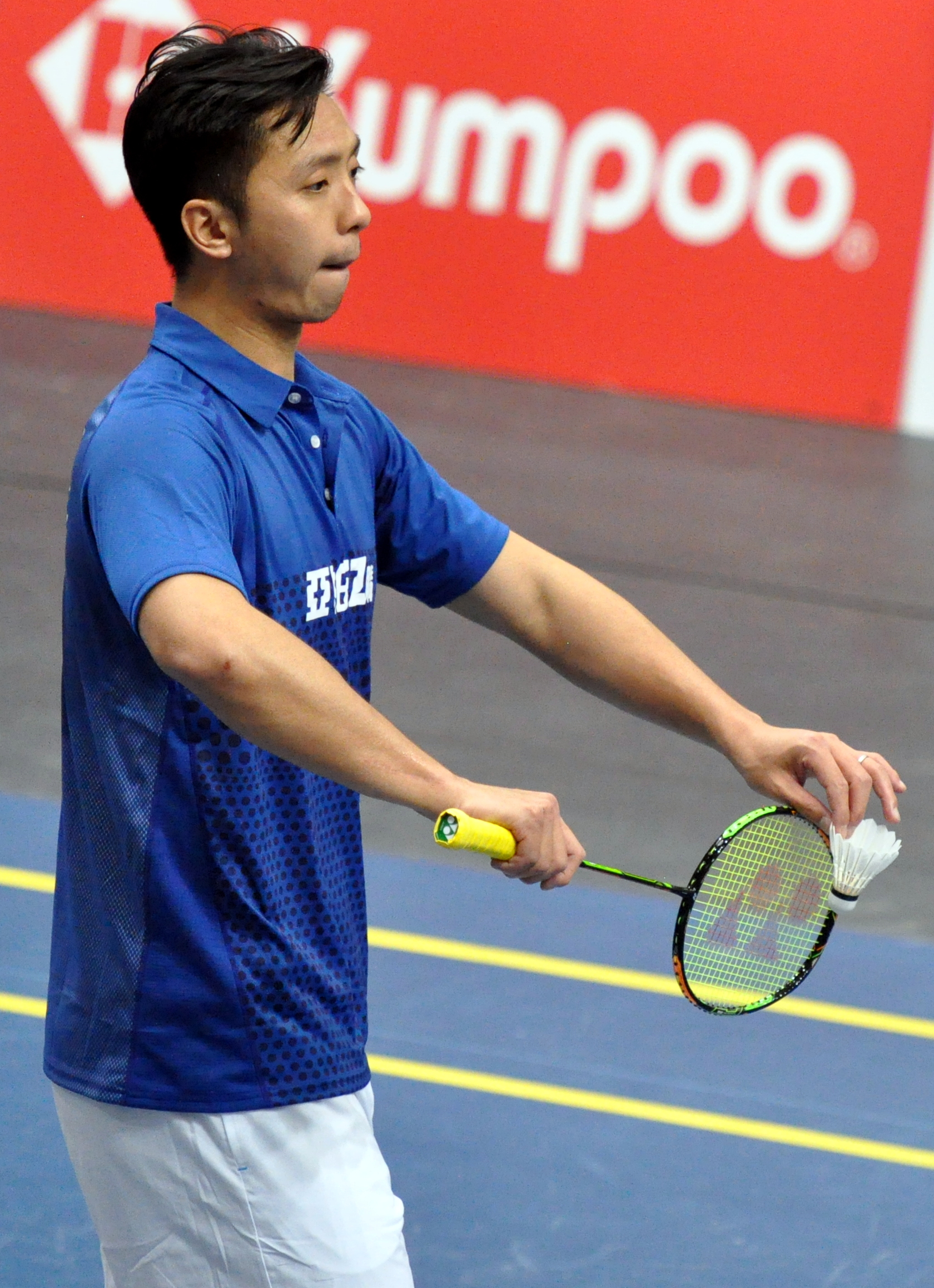

Personal information
- Born: 27 January 1988 (age 38) Kaohsiung, Taiwan
- Height: 1.80 m (5 ft 11 in)
- Weight: 85 kg (187 lb)

Sport
- Country: Taiwan
- Sport: Badminton
- Handedness: Right

Men's & mixed doubles
- Highest ranking: 10 (MD with Su Ching-heng 2 August 2018); 31 (XD with Chen Hsiao-huan 8 December 2016)
- BWF profile
Medal record
Men's badminton
Representing Chinese Taipei
Asian Games
Bronze medal – third place	2014 Incheon	Men's team
Summer Universiade
Bronze medal – third place	2011 Shenzhen	Men's doubles
Bronze medal – third place	2011 Shenzhen	Mixed team

Liao Min-chun (Chinese: 廖敏竣; pinyin: Liào Mǐnjùn; born 27 January 1988) is a Taiwanese badminton player. In 2013, he won the men's doubles title at the Vietnam International tournament partnered with Yang Po-han. Teamed-up with Su Ching-heng in the men's doubles, he won the International Challenge title at the 2016 Welsh International, 2017 Orleans International, and 2017 Finnish Open tournament. He announced retirement on January 20, 2023.

== Achievements ==
=== Summer Universiade ===
Men's doubles
Year	Venue	Partner	Opponent	Score	Result
2011	Gymnasium of SZIIT; Shenzhen, China	(Chinese Taipei) Wu Chun-wei	(Thailand) Bodin Isara (Thailand) Maneepong Jongjit	20–22, 21–23	Bronze

=== BWF World Tour (1 runner-up) ===
The BWF World Tour, which was announced on 19 March 2017 and implemented in 2018, is a series of elite badminton tournaments, sanctioned by Badminton World Federation (BWF). The BWF World Tour is divided into six levels, namely World Tour Finals, Super 1000, Super 750, Super 500, Super 300 (part of the HSBC World Tour), and the BWF Tour Super 100.

Men's doubles
Year	Tournament	Level	Partner	Opponent	Score	Result
2018	Chinese Taipei Open	Super 300	(Chinese Taipei) Su Ching-heng	(Chinese Taipei) Chen Hung-ling (Chinese Taipei) Wang Chi-lin	20–22, 9–21	(silver) Runner-up

=== BWF Grand Prix (1 title, 4 runners-up) ===
The BWF Grand Prix had two levels, the Grand Prix and Grand Prix Gold. It was a series of badminton tournaments sanctioned by the Badminton World Federation (BWF) and played between 2007 and 2017.

Men's doubles
Year	Tournament	Partner	Opponent	Score	Result
2014	Canada Open	(Chinese Taipei) Tseng Min-hao	(Chinese Taipei) Liang Jui-wei (Chinese Taipei) Lu Chia-pin	18–21, 21–16, 16–21	(silver) Runner-up
2017	Vietnam Open	(Chinese Taipei) Su Ching-heng	(Indonesia) Wahyu Nayaka (Indonesia) Ade Yusuf	21–12, 16–21, 21–23	(silver) Runner-up
2017	Dutch Open	(Chinese Taipei) Su Ching-heng	(Japan) Takuto Inoue (Japan) Yuki Kaneko	24–22, 21–18	(gold) Winner

Mixed doubles
Year	Tournament	Partner	Opponent	Score	Result
2013	Vietnam Open	(Chinese Taipei) Chen Hsiao-huan	(South Korea) Choi Sol-gyu (South Korea) Chae Yoo-jung	20–22, 21–19, 14–21	(silver) Runner-up
2017	China Masters	(Chinese Taipei) Chen Hsiao-huan	(China) Wang Yilyu (China) Huang Dongping	14–21, 10–21	(silver) Runner-up

BWF Grand Prix Gold tournament
BWF Grand Prix tournament

=== BWF International Challenge/Series (4 titles, 1 runner-up) ===
Men's doubles
Year	Tournament	Partner	Opponent	Score	Result
2013	Vietnam International	(Chinese Taipei) Yang Po-han	(Hong Kong) Chan Yun Lung (Hong Kong) Wong Wai Hong	30–28, 21–14	(gold) Winner
2016	Welsh International	(Chinese Taipei) Su Ching-heng	(Chinese Taipei) Liao Kuan-hao (Chinese Taipei) Lu Chia-pin	21–19, 21–13	(gold) Winner
2016	Irish Open	(Chinese Taipei) Su Ching-heng	(Germany) Jones Ralfy Jansen (Germany) Josche Zurwonne	25–27, 21–23	(silver) Runner-up
2017	Orléans International	(Chinese Taipei) Su Ching-heng	(Indonesia) Kenas Adi Haryanto (Indonesia) Muhammad Reza Pahlevi Isfahani	21–12, 14–21, 21–17	(gold) Winner
2017	Finnish Open	(Chinese Taipei) Su Ching-heng	(Japan) Kohei Gondo (Japan) Tatsuya Watanabe	21–16, 21–16	(gold) Winner

BWF International Challenge tournament
BWF International Series tournament
BWF Future Series tournament
