= Liao Kuan-hao =

Taiwanese badminton player (born 1990)

Liao Kuan-hao 廖寬浩
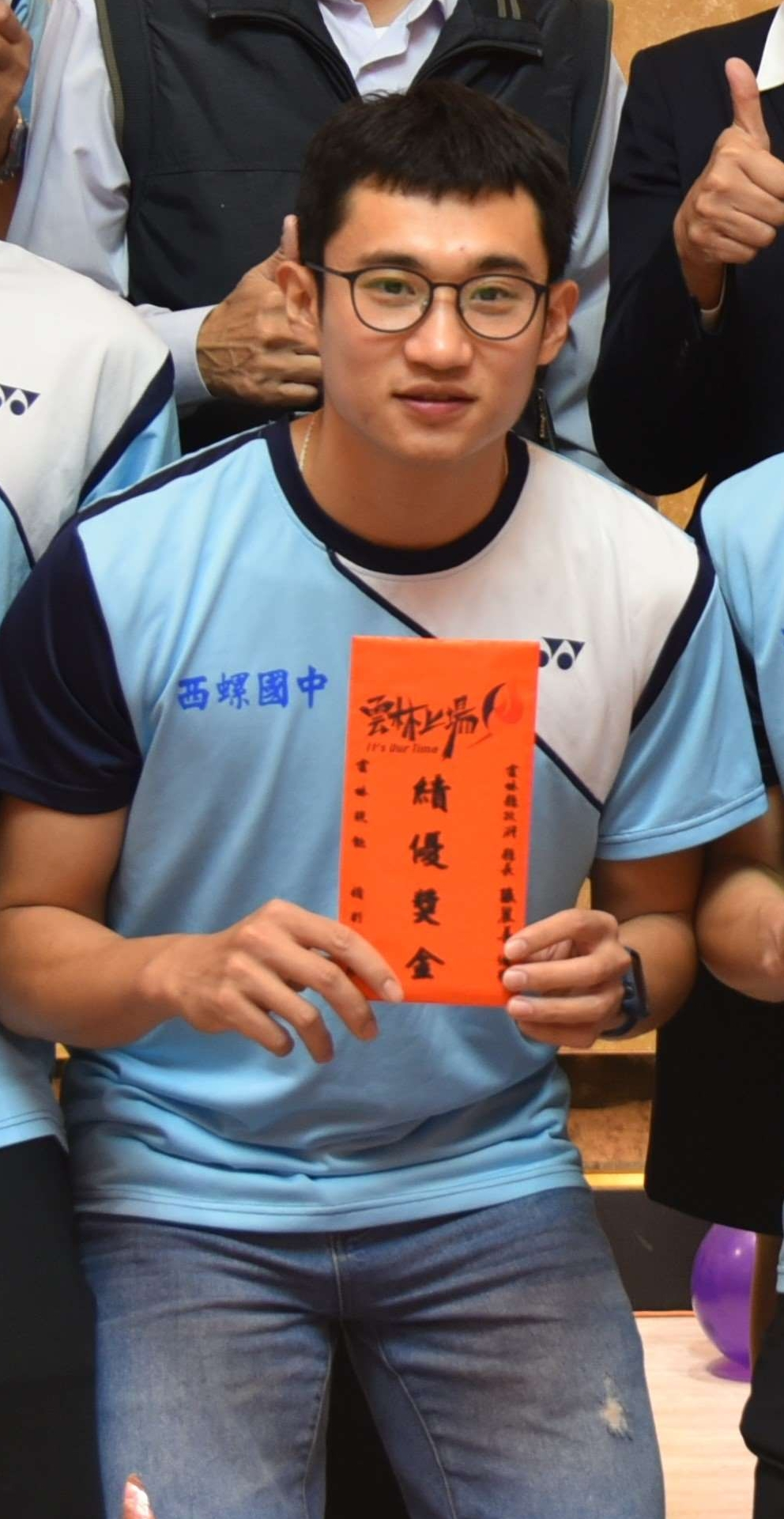
- Liao Kuan-hao in 2019

Personal information
- Born: 7 October 1990 (age 36) Yunlin, Taiwan
- Height: 1.74 m (5 ft 9 in)
- Weight: 69 kg (152 lb)

Sport
- Country: Republic of China (Taiwan)
- Sport: Badminton

Men's & mixed doubles
- Highest ranking: 21 (MD 16 January 2014); 129 (XD 29 August 2013)
- BWF profile
Medal record
Men's badminton
Representing Chinese Taipei
Asian Games
Bronze medal – third place	2014 Incheon	Men's team
East Asian Games
Bronze medal – third place	2013 Tianjin	Men's team

Liao Kuan-hao (Chinese: 廖寬浩; born 7 October 1990) is a male Taiwanese badminton player. He competed at the 2014 Asian Games.

== Achievements ==
=== BWF Grand Prix (1 runner-up) ===
The BWF Grand Prix has two levels: Grand Prix and Grand Prix Gold. It is a series of badminton tournaments, sanctioned by the Badminton World Federation (BWF) since 2007.

Men's doubles
Year	Tournament	Partner	Opponent	Score	Result
2013	U.S. Open	(Chinese Taipei) Liang Jui-wei	(Japan) Takeshi Kamura (Japan) Keigo Sonoda	16–21, 25–27	(silver) Runner-up

BWF Grand Prix Gold tournament
BWF Grand Prix tournament

=== BWF International Challenge/Series (3 titles, 3 runners-up) ===
Men's doubles
Year	Tournament	Partner	Opponent	Score	Result
2016	Welsh International	(Chinese Taipei) Lu Chia-pin	(Chinese Taipei) Liao Min-chun (Chinese Taipei) Su Cheng-heng	19–21, 13–21	(silver) Runner-up
2014	Austrian International	(Chinese Taipei) Liang Jui-wei	(Chinese Taipei) Chen Hung-ling (Chinese Taipei) Lu Chia-pin	21–16, 12–21, 13–21	(silver) Runner-up
2014	Iran Fajr International	(Chinese Taipei) Liang Jui-wei	(Chinese Taipei) Chen Hung-ling (Chinese Taipei) Lu Chia-pin	17–21, 18–21	(silver) Runner-up
2013	Bangladesh International	(Chinese Taipei) Liang Jui-wei	(Chinese Taipei) Hung Ying-yuan (Chinese Taipei) Su Cheng-heng	21–13, 21–14	(gold) Winner
2012	Singapore International	(Chinese Taipei) Liang Jui-wei	(Chinese Taipei) Liao Chun-chieh (Chinese Taipei) Lin Yen-jui	21–11, 21–15	(gold) Winner
2011	Bulgarian International	(Chinese Taipei) Liang Jui-wei	(Chinese Taipei) Huang Po-yi (Chinese Taipei) Lu Chia-bin	21–12, 22–20	(gold) Winner

BWF International Challenge tournament
BWF International Series tournament
BWF Future Series tournament
