= Hsu Jen-hao =

Taiwanese badminton player

Hsu Jen-hao 許仁豪
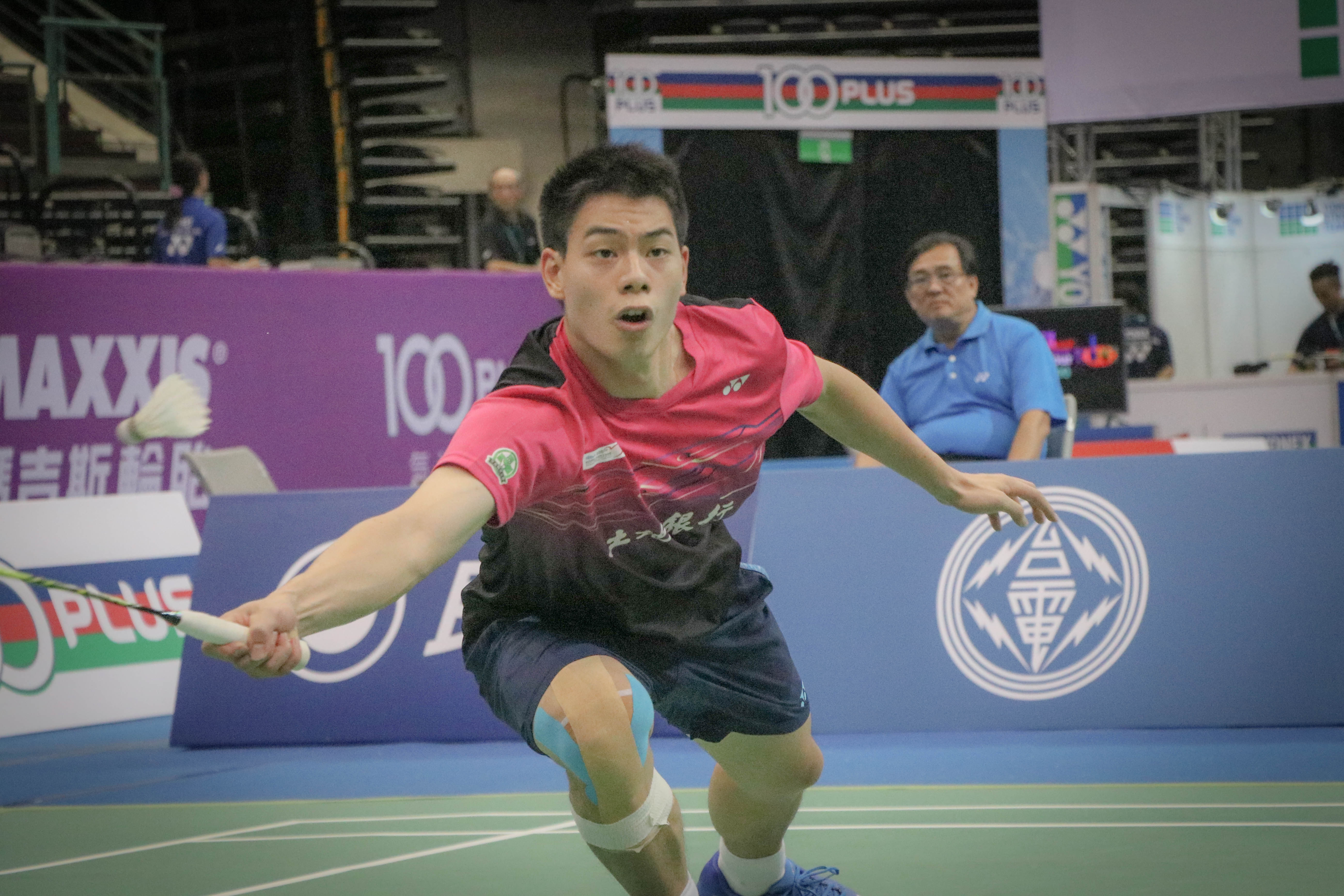

Personal information
- Born: 26 October 1991 (age 35) Taipei, Taiwan
- Height: 1.70 m (5 ft 7 in)
- Weight: 66 kg (146 lb)

Sport
- Country: Republic of China (Taiwan)
- Sport: Badminton
- Handedness: Right

Men's singles & doubles
- Highest ranking: 20 (MS 20 October 2016); 169 (MD 14 November 2013)
- Current ranking: 35 (MS 13 September 2018)
- BWF profile
Medal record
Men's badminton
Representing Chinese Taipei
Asian Games
Bronze medal – third place	2014 Incheon	Men's team
Bronze medal – third place	2018 Jakarta-Palembang	Men's team
East Asian Games
Bronze medal – third place	2009 Hong Kong	Men's team
Bronze medal – third place	2013 Tianjin	Men's team
Summer Universiade
Gold medal – first place	2017 Taipei	Mixed team
Bronze medal – third place	2015 Gwangju	Men's singles
World Junior Championships
Bronze medal – third place	2009 Alor Setar	Boys' singles

Hsu Jen-hao (Chinese: 許仁豪; born 26 October 1991) is a Taiwanese badminton player.

== Career ==
In 2012, he competed at the London 2012 Olympic Games in the men's singles event, but he did not advance to the next round after being defeated in the group stage by Son Wan-ho of Korea with the score of 21–14, 21-10 and by Vladimir Ivanov of Russia with the score of 21–15, 21–13. He also reached in the semifinal of 2016 French Super Series and was defeated by the champion, Shi Yuqi from China.

== Achievements ==
=== Summer Universiade ===
Men's singles
Year	Venue	Opponent	Score	Result
2015	Hwasun Hanium Culture Sports Center; Hwasun, South Korea	(South Korea) Son Wan-ho	18–21, 21–17, 12–21	Bronze

=== BWF World Tour (1 runner-up) ===
The BWF World Tour, announced on 19 March 2017 and implemented in 2018, is a series of elite badminton tournaments, sanctioned by Badminton World Federation (BWF). The BWF World Tour is divided into six levels, namely World Tour Finals, Super 1000, Super 750, Super 500, Super 300 (part of the HSBC World Tour), and the BWF Tour Super 100.

Men's singles
Year	Tournament	Level	Opponent	Score	Result
2018	Singapore Open	Super 500	(Chinese Taipei) Chou Tien-chen	13–21, 13–21	(silver) Runner-up

=== BWF Grand Prix (1 title, 2 runners-up) ===
The BWF Grand Prix has two levels: Grand Prix and Grand Prix Gold. It is a series of badminton tournaments, sanctioned by the Badminton World Federation (BWF) since 2007.

Men's singles
Year	Tournament	Opponent	Score	Result
2017	Bitburger Open	(Denmark) Rasmus Gemke	18–21, 10–21	(silver) Runner-up
2014	U.S. Grand Prix	(Czech Republic) Petr Koukal	21–19, 19–21, 21–8	(gold) Winner
2014	New Zealand Open	(Chinese Taipei) Wang Tzu-wei	9–21, 13–21	(silver) Runner-up

BWF Grand Prix Gold tournament
BWF Grand Prix tournament

=== BWF International Challenge/Series (4 titles, 3 runners-up) ===
Men's singles
Year	Tournament	Opponent	Score	Result
2013	Bangladesh International	(Malaysia) Yogendran Khrishnan	21–23, 14–21	(silver) Runner-up
2013	Polish Open	(Russia) Vladimir Malkov	12–21, 22–20, 18–21	(silver) Runner-up
2012	Polish Open	(Ukraine) Dmytro Zavadsky	21–17, 21–10	(gold) Winner
2011	White Nights	(Singapore) Derek Wong Zi Liang	21–18, 14–21, 21–12	(gold) Winner
2011	Slovenian International	(Guatemala) Kevin Cordon	21–14, 19–21, 21–10	(gold) Winner
2011	Austrian International	(Ukraine) Dmytro Zavadsky	21–15, 21–12	(gold) Winner
2010	Kaohsiung International	(Thailand) Pakkawat Vilailak	10–21, 15–21	(silver) Runner-up

BWF International Challenge tournament
BWF International Series tournament
