= Lu Chia-pin =

Taiwanese badminton player (born 1990)

Lu Chia-pin 呂佳彬
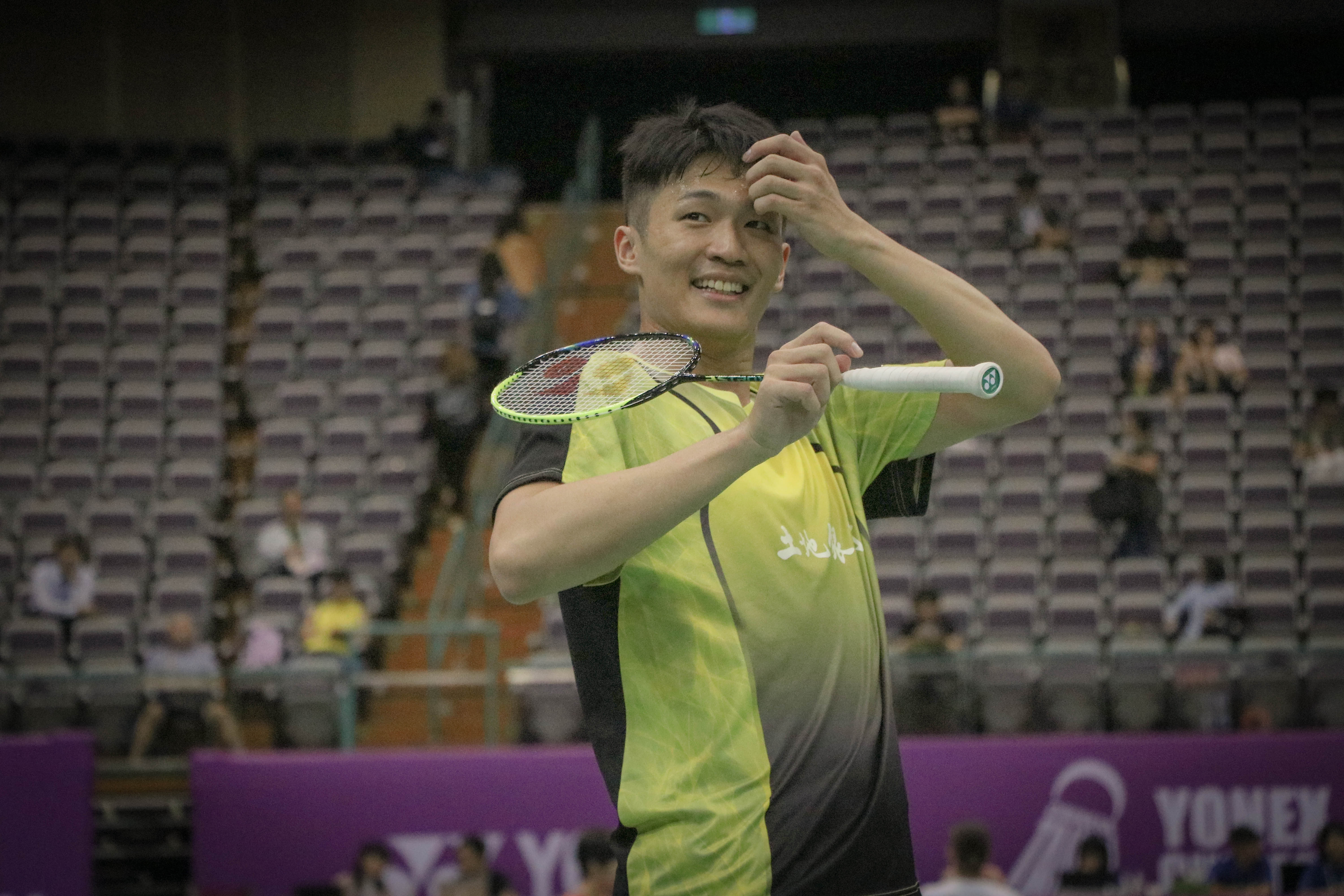

Personal information
- Born: 24 February 1990 (age 36) Taipei, Taiwan
- Height: 1.86 m (6 ft 1 in)
- Weight: 81 kg (179 lb)

Sport
- Country: Republic of China (Taiwan)
- Sport: Badminton
- Handedness: Right

Men's & mixed doubles
- Highest ranking: 21 (MD 16 October 2014); 133 (XD 3 April 2014)
- BWF profile
Medal record
Men's badminton
Representing Chinese Taipei
East Asian Games
| Silver medal – second place | 2013 Tianjin | Men's doubles |
| Bronze medal – third place | 2013 Tianjin | Men's team |
Summer Universiade
| Bronze medal – third place | 2013 Kazan | Mixed team |

Lu Chia-pin (Chinese: 呂佳彬; pinyin: Lǚ Jiābīn; born 24 February 1990) is a Taiwanese badminton player. In 2013, he competed at the Summer Universiade in Kazan, Russia, and won a bronze medal in the team event.

== Achievements ==
=== East Asian Games ===
Men's doubles
| Year | Venue | Partner | Opponent | Score | Result |
|---|---|---|---|---|---|
| 2013 | Binhai New Area Dagang Gymnasium; Tianjin, China | (Chinese Taipei) Chen Hung-ling | (Chinese Taipei) Lee Sheng-mu (Chinese Taipei) Tsai Chia-hsin | 8–21, 18–21 | Silver |

=== BWF World Tour ===
The BWF World Tour, which was announced on 19 March 2017 and implemented in 2018, is a series of elite badminton tournaments sanctioned by the Badminton World Federation (BWF). The BWF World Tour is divided into levels of World Tour Finals, Super 1000, Super 750, Super 500, Super 300 (part of the HSBC World Tour), and the BWF Tour Super 100.

Men's doubles
| Year | Tournament | Level | Partner | Opponent | Score | Result |
|---|---|---|---|---|---|---|
| 2018 | Indonesia Masters | Super 100 | (Chinese Taipei) Chang Ko-chi | (South Korea) Ko Sung-hyun (South Korea) Shin Baek-cheol | 23–21, 21–13 | (gold) Winner |

=== BWF Grand Prix ===
The BWF Grand Prix had two levels, the Grand Prix and Grand Prix Gold. It was a series of badminton tournaments sanctioned by the Badminton World Federation (BWF) and played between 2007 and 2017.

Men's doubles
| Year | Tournament | Partner | Opponent | Score | Result |
|---|---|---|---|---|---|
| 2014 | New Zealand Open | (Chinese Taipei) Chen Hung-ling | (Indonesia) Selvanus Geh (Indonesia) Kevin Sanjaya Sukamuljo | 21–15, 21–23, 11–21 | (silver) Runner-up |
| 2014 | Canada Open | (Chinese Taipei) Liang Jui-wei | (Chinese Taipei) Liao Min-chun (Chinese Taipei) Tseng Min-hao | 21–18, 16–21, 21–16 | (gold) Winner |

BWF Grand Prix Gold tournament
BWF Grand Prix tournament

=== BWF International Challenge/Series (4 titles, 5 runners-up) ===
Men's doubles
| Year | Tournament | Partner | Opponent | Score | Result |
|---|---|---|---|---|---|
| 2011 | New Zealand International | (Chinese Taipei) Huang Po-yi | (Singapore) Danny Bawa Chrisnanta (Singapore) Hendra Wijaya | 15–21, 17–21 | (silver) Runner-up |
| 2011 | Bulgarian International | (Chinese Taipei) Huang Po-yi | (Chinese Taipei) Liang Jui-wei (Chinese Taipei) Liao Kuan-hao | 12–21, 20–22 | (silver) Runner-up |
| 2014 | Iran Fajr International | (Chinese Taipei) Chen Hung-ling | (Chinese Taipei) Liang Jui-wei (Chinese Taipei) Liao Kuan-hao | 21–17, 21–18 | (gold) Winner |
| 2014 | Austrian International | (Chinese Taipei) Chen Hung-ling | (Chinese Taipei) Liang Jui-wei (Chinese Taipei) Liao Kuan-hao | 16–21, 21–12, 21–13 | (gold) Winner |
| 2016 | Welsh International | (Chinese Taipei) Liao Kuan-hao | (Chinese Taipei) Liao Min-chun (Chinese Taipei) Su Cheng-heng | 19–21, 13–21 | (silver) Runner-up |
| 2017 | Yonex / K&D Graphics International | (Chinese Taipei) Lu Chia-hung | (England) Marcus Ellis (England) Chris Langridge | 14–21, 17–21 | (silver) Runner-up |
| 2018 | Yonex / K&D Graphics International | (Chinese Taipei) Lu Chia-hung | (United States) Phillip Chew (United States) Ryan Chew | 21–18, 21–10 | (gold) Winner |

Mixed doubles
| Year | Tournament | Partner | Opponent | Score | Result |
|---|---|---|---|---|---|
| 2019 | Maldives Future Series | (Chinese Taipei) Lin Wan-ching | (Malaysia) Velayutham Roobenraj (Malaysia) Venosha Radhakrishnan | 21–10, 21–18 | (gold) Winner |
| 2019 | Yonex / K&D Graphics International | (Chinese Taipei) Lin Wan-ching | (Canada) Joshua Hurlburt-Yu (Canada) Josephine Wu | 18–21, 18–21 | (silver) Runner-up |

BWF International Challenge tournament
BWF International Series tournament
BWF Future Series tournament
