= Ashton Chen (badminton) =

Singaporean badminton player (born 1989)

Ashton Chen Yong Zhao 陈勇肇
Personal information
- Born: 9 September 1989 (age 37) Singapore
- Height: 1.74 m (5 ft 9 in)
- Weight: 63 kg (139 lb)

Sport
- Sport: Badminton
- Handedness: Right

Men's singles
- Highest ranking: 50 (22 November 2012)
- BWF profile
Medal record
Men's badminton
Representing Singapore
World Senior Championships
| Bronze medal – third place | 2025 Pattaya | Men's singles 35+ |
Southeast Asian Games
| Silver medal – second place | 2007 Nakhon Ratchasima | Men's team |
| Bronze medal – third place | 2009 Vientiane | Men's team |
| Bronze medal – third place | 2011 Jakarta–Palembang | Men's team |
World Junior Championships
| Bronze medal – third place | 2007 Waitakere City | Mixed team |

Ashton Chen Yong Zhao (Chinese: 陈勇肇; born 9 September 1989) is a Singaporean retired badminton player and a former national champion.

== Career ==
Chen was part of the South East Asian Games men's team that won silver medal in the 2007 edition and bronze medals in the 2009, 2011 editions. In 2012, he won the men's singles title at the Singaporean National Badminton Championships. At the BWF event tournaments, he has won the men's singles title at the 2007 Waikato and 2011 Smiling Fish Thailand International tournament, and in the men's doubles, he won the 2011 Maldives International tournament. Chen quits the national team on 11 April 2014 after playing his final game for Singapore in the Djarum Superliga 2014 tournament.

== Personal life ==
Chen pleaded guilty for having sexual contact with a young 13-year-old girl and was sentenced to 28 months in jail.

== Achievements ==
=== World Senior Championships ===
Men's singles

| Year | Age | Venue | Opponent | Score | Result | Ref |
|---|---|---|---|---|---|---|
| 2025 | 35+ | Eastern National Sports Training Centre, Pattaya, Thailand | (Thailand) Suppanyu Avihingsanon | 14–21, 21–14, 18–21 | Bronze | |

=== BWF International Challenge/Series ===
Men's singles
| Year | Tournament | Opponent | Score | Result |
|---|---|---|---|---|
| 2007 | Waikato International | (Spain) Pablo Abián | 21–17, 21–17 | (gold) Winner |
| 2011 | Smiling Fish International | (Thailand) Parinyawat Thongnuam | 21–17, 21–19 | (gold) Winner |
| 2011 | Vietnam International | (South Korea) Lee Dong-keun | 21–18, 17–21, 19–21 | (silver) Runner-up |
| 2012 | Singapore International | (Thailand) Sitthikom Thammasin | 20–22, 21–8, 8–21 | (silver) Runner-up |

Men's doubles
| Year | Tournament | Partner | Opponent | Score | Result |
|---|---|---|---|---|---|
| 2007 | Waikato International | (Singapore) Khoo Kian Teck | (Indonesia) Wifqi Windarto (Indonesia) Afiat Yuris Wirawan | 14–21, 15–21 | (silver) Runner-up |
| 2011 | Maldives International | (Singapore) Derek Wong | (Austria) Jürgen Koch (Austria) Peter Zauner | 21–19, 21–17 | (gold) Winner |

BWF International Challenge tournament
BWF International Series tournament
