= Danny Bawa Chrisnanta =

Singaporean badminton player

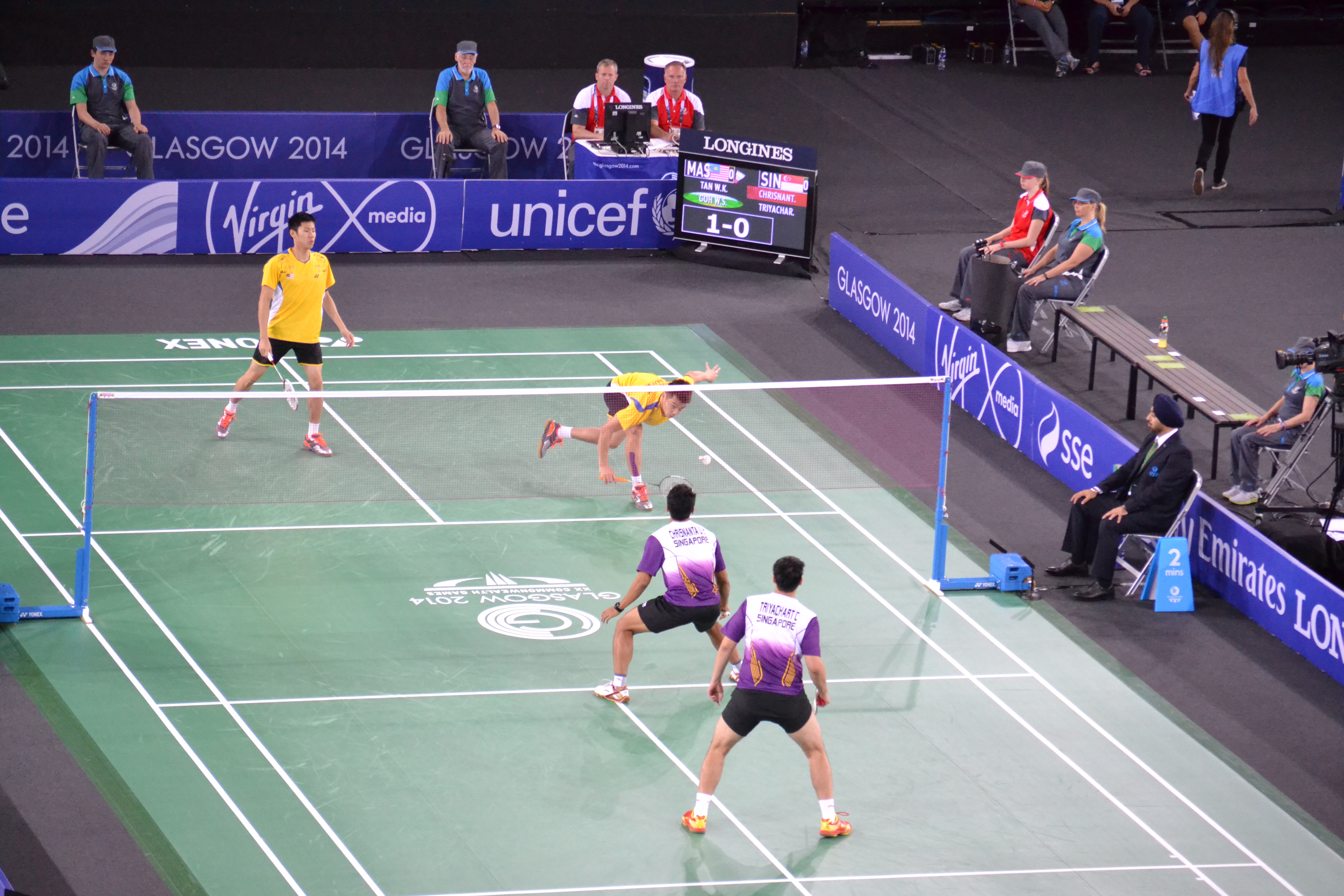

Personal information
- Born: 30 December 1988 (age 37) Salatiga, Central Java, Indonesia
- Height: 1.72 m (5 ft 8 in)
- Weight: 75 kg (165 lb)

Sport
- Country: Singapore
- Sport: Badminton
- Handedness: Right
- Retired: 27 May 2022

Men's & mixed doubles
- Career record: 425 wins, 324 losses
- Career title: 15
- Highest ranking: 16 (MD with Chayut Triyachart 16 April 2015); 9 (XD with Vanessa Neo 28 February 2013)
- BWF profile
Medal record
Men's badminton
Representing Singapore
World Senior Championships
Gold medal – first place	2025 Pattaya	Men's doubles 35+
Bronze medal – third place	2025 Pattaya	Mixed doubles 35+
Commonwealth Games
Silver medal – second place	2014 Glasgow	Men's doubles
Bronze medal – third place	2014 Glasgow	Mixed team
Asia Team Championships
Bronze medal – third place	2022 Selangor	Men's team
Southeast Asian Games
Bronze medal – third place	2015 Singapore	Men's doubles
Bronze medal – third place	2015 Singapore	Men's team
Bronze medal – third place	2017 Kuala Lumpur	Men's team
Bronze medal – third place	2019 Philippines	Men's team
Bronze medal – third place	2021 Vietnam	Men's team

Danny Bawa Chrisnanta (born 30 December 1988) is an Indonesian-born Singaporean former badminton player and coach.

== Career ==
Danny competed at the 2014 and 2018 Commonwealth Games, where he captured a bronze medal in the mixed team and a silver medal in the men's doubles events in 2014. He is also the 2019 mixed doubles national champion with his partner Tan Wei Han.

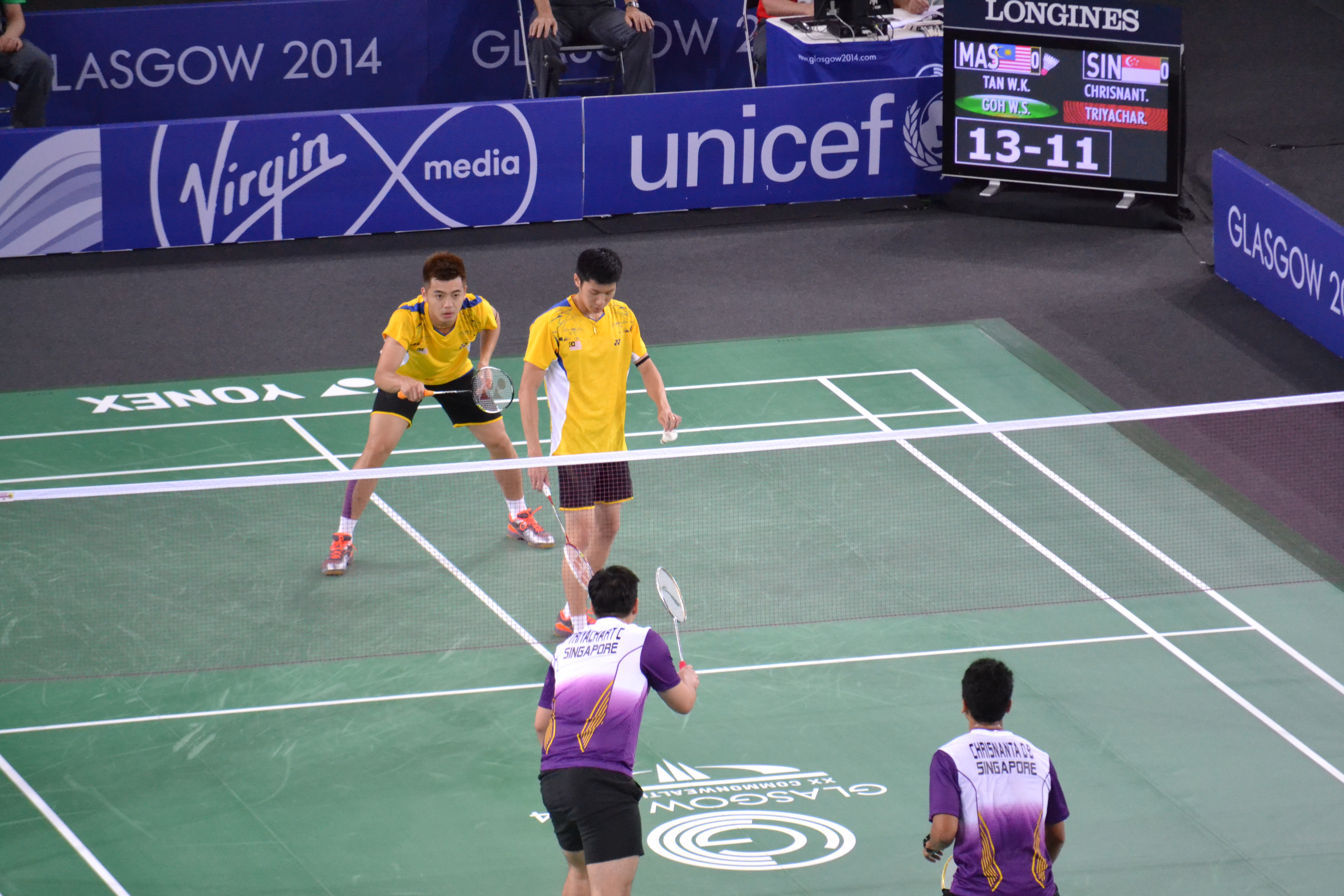
Chrisnanta and Chayut Triyachart against Malaysian pair during the final of 2014 Commonwealth Games

Chrisnanta spent the later part of his career playing Men's Doubles with Andy Kwek. On 27 May 2022, he announced on his Instagram page that he had left the national team. The 2021 Southeast Asian Games was his final tournament, where he played Men's Doubles with Kwek in the Individual and Team events.

== Personal life ==
Born in Indonesia, Chrisnanta emigrated to Singapore in 2007 and became a citizen in 2013.

== Achievements ==
=== World Senior Championships ===
Men's doubles
Year	Age	Venue	Partner	Opponent	Score	Result	Ref.
2025	35+	Eastern National Sports Training Centre; Pattaya, Thailand	(Indonesia) Fernando Kurniawan	(France) Laurent Constantin (France) Brice Leverdez	21–14, 21–16	Gold	

Mixed doubles
Year	Age	Venue	Partner	Opponent	Score	Result	Ref.
2025	35+	Eastern National Sports Training Centre; Pattaya, Thailand	(Singapore) Xing Aiying	(Thailand) Nawut Thanateeratam (Thailand) Vacharaporn Munkit	21–17, 11–21, 10–21	Bronze	

=== Commonwealth Games ===
Men's doubles
Year	Venue	Partner	Opponent	Score	Result
2014	Emirates Arena, Glasgow, Scotland	(Singapore) Chayut Triyachart	(Malaysia) Goh V Shem (Malaysia) Tan Wee Kiong	12–21, 21–12, 15–21	Silver

=== Southeast Asian Games ===
Men's doubles
Year	Venue	Partner	Opponent	Score	Result
2015	Singapore Indoor Stadium, Singapore	(Singapore) Chayut Triyachart	(Indonesia) Angga Pratama (Indonesia) Ricky Karanda Suwardi	12–21, 18–21	Bronze

=== BWF Grand Prix (3 titles, 2 runners-up) ===
The BWF Grand Prix had two levels, the Grand Prix and Grand Prix Gold. It was a series of badminton tournaments sanctioned by the Badminton World Federation (BWF) and played between 2007 and 2017.

Men's doubles
Year	Tournament	Partner	Opponent	Score	Result
2011	Vietnam Open	(Singapore) Chayut Triyachart	(Indonesia) Angga Pratama (Indonesia) Rian Agung Saputro	12–21, 21–16, 19–21	(silver) Runner-up
2014	Malaysia Grand Prix Gold	(Singapore) Chayut Triyachart	(Malaysia) Goh V Shem (Malaysia) Lim Khim Wah	21–17, 22–20	(gold) Winner
2014	Macau Open	(Singapore) Chayut Triyachart	(Indonesia) Angga Pratama (Indonesia) Ricky Karanda Suwardi	21–19, 22–20	(gold) Winner

Mixed doubles
Year	Tournament	Partner	Opponent	Score	Result
2013	Dutch Open	(Singapore) Vanessa Neo	(Indonesia) Muhammad Rijal (Indonesia) Debby Susanto	21–19, 25–23	(gold) Winner
2014	Macau Open	(Singapore) Vanessa Neo	(Indonesia) Edi Subaktiar (Indonesia) Gloria Emanuelle Widjaja	15–21, 30–29, 20–22	(silver) Runner-up

BWF Grand Prix Gold tournament
BWF Grand Prix tournament

=== BWF International Challenge/Series (13 titles, 19 runners-up) ===
Men's doubles
Year	Tournament	Partner	Opponent	Score	Result
2006	Brazil International	(Indonesia) Afiat Yuris Wirawan	(Brazil) Guilherme Kumasaka (Brazil) Guilherme Pardo	21–15, 21–15	(gold) Winner
2008	Singapore International	(Singapore) Chayut Triyachart	(Indonesia) Fernando Kurniawan (Indonesia) Lingga Lie	12–21, 21–17, 19–21	(silver) Runner-up
2009	Singapore International	(Singapore) Chayut Triyachart	(South Korea) Heo Hoon-hoi (South Korea) Lee Jae-jin	22–20, 18–21, 16–21	(silver) Runner-up
2010	Banuinvest International	(Singapore) Chayut Triyachart	(Austria) Juergen Koch (Austria) Peter Zauner	16–21, 15–21	(silver) Runner-up
2011	New Zealand International	(Singapore) Hendra Wijaya	(Chinese Taipei) Huang Po-yi (Chinese Taipei) Lu Chia-pin	21–15, 21–17	(gold) Winner
2014	Sri Lanka International	(Singapore) Chayut Triyachart	(India) Manu Attri (India) B. Sumeeth Reddy	21–17, 21–19	(gold) Winner
2016	Smiling Fish International	(Singapore) Hendra Wijaya	(Malaysia) Nur Mohd Azriyn Ayub (Malaysia) Jagdish Singh	14–21, 21–14, 21–14	(gold) Winner
2016	Singapore International	(Singapore) Hendra Wijaya	(Malaysia) Goh Sze Fei (Malaysia) Nur Izzuddin	13–21, 14–21	(silver) Runner-up
2016	Hungarian International	(Singapore) Hendra Wijaya	(Denmark) Frederik Colberg (Denmark) Rasmus Fladberg	11–7, 14–15, 7–11, 11–9, 11–8	(gold) Winner
2017	Nepal International	(Singapore) Terry Hee	(Malaysia) Tan Chee Tean (Malaysia) Ian Wong Jien Sern	22–20, 14–21, 21–16	(gold) Winner
2018	Mongolia International	(Singapore) Bimo Adi Prakoso	(Singapore) Lee Jian Liang (Singapore) Jason Wong	22–20, 21–23, 18–21	(silver) Runner-up
2018	South Australia International	(Singapore) Terry Hee	(Japan) Akira Koga (Japan) Taichi Saito	11–21, 21–19, 16–21	(silver) Runner-up
2018	Sydney International	(Singapore) Terry Hee	(Japan) Hiroki Okamura (Japan) Masayuki Onodera	6–21, 11–21	(silver) Runner-up
2018	Singapore International	(Singapore) Terry Hee	(Hong Kong) Yonny Chung (Hong Kong) Tam Chun Hei	21–13, 18–21, 19–21	(silver) Runner-up
2019	Estonian International	(Singapore) Loh Kean Hean	(England) Peter Briggs (England) Gregory Mairs	20–22, 18–21	(silver) Runner-up
2022	Estonian International	(Singapore) Andy Kwek	(Thailand) Ruttanapak Oupthong (Thailand) Sirawit Sothon	17–21, 21–17, 16–21	(silver) Runner-up
2022	Swedish Open	(Singapore) Andy Kwek	(Malaysia) Chia Wei Jie (Malaysia) Low Hang Yee	21–13, 23–21	(gold) Winner

Mixed doubles
Year	Tournament	Partner	Opponent	Score	Result
2006	Brazil International	(Indonesia) Meiliana Jauhari	(Indonesia) Afiat Yuris Wirawan (Indonesia) Purwati	Walkover	(silver) Runner-up
2008	Malaysia International	(Singapore) Vanessa Neo	(Malaysia) Lutfi Zaim Abdul Khalid (Malaysia) Lim Yin Loo	21–14, 17–21, 19–21	(silver) Runner-up
2011	New Zealand International	(Singapore) Vanessa Neo	(Japan) Takeshi Kamura (Japan) Koharu Yonemoto	21–14, 21–13	(gold) Winner
2011	White Nights	(Singapore) Vanessa Neo	(France) Baptiste Carême (France) Audrey Fontaine	21–18, 19–21, 21–15	(gold) Winner
2011	Singapore International	(Singapore) Vanessa Neo	(Malaysia) Mohd Razif Abdul Latif (Malaysia) Amelia Alicia Anscelly	23–21, 21–14	(gold) Winner
2012	Vietnam International	(Singapore) Vanessa Neo	(Indonesia) Hafiz Faizal (Indonesia) Pia Zebadiah Bernadet	21–11, 17–21, 17–21	(silver) Runner-up
2015	Bahrain International Challenge	(Singapore) Vanessa Neo	(Thailand) Bodin Isara (Thailand) Savitree Amitrapai	17–21, 19–21	(silver) Runner-up
2015	USA International	(Singapore) Vanessa Neo	(Germany) Michael Fuchs (Germany) Birgit Michels	16–21, 17–21	(silver) Runner-up
2016	Singapore International	(Singapore) Citra Putri Sari Dewi	(Indonesia) Yantoni Edy Saputra (Indonesia) Marsheilla Gischa Islami	9–21, 18–21	(silver) Runner-up
2018	Mongolia International	(Singapore) Crystal Wong	(Singapore) Bimo Adi Prakoso (Singapore) Jin Yujia	11–21, 20–22	(silver) Runner-up
2018	Sydney International	(Singapore) Crystal Wong	(Japan) Tadayuki Urai (Japan) Rena Miyaura	16–21, 17–21	(silver) Runner-up
2018	Turkey International	(Singapore) Tan Wei Han	(Indonesia) Leo Rolly Carnando (Indonesia) Indah Cahya Sari Jamil	21–19, 16–21, 21–12	(gold) Winner
2019	Estonian International	(Singapore) Tan Wei Han	(England) Gregory Mairs (England) Victoria Williams	21–18, 14–21, 21–15	(gold) Winner
2019	Swedish Open	(Singapore) Tan Wei Han	(Denmark) Mikkel Mikkelsen (Denmark) Mai Surrow	21–14, 21–16	(gold) Winner
2019	Austrian Open	(Singapore) Tan Wei Han	(Netherlands) Robin Tabeling (Netherlands) Selena Piek	21–19, 16–21, 12–21	(silver) Runner-up

BWF International Challenge tournament
BWF International Series tournament
