= 2025 BWF World Senior Championships – 35+ =

Tournament details
- Dates: 7 September 2025 – 14 September 2025
- Edition: 12
- Level: International
- Competitors: 260 from 32 nations
- Venue: Eastern National Sports Training Centre
- Location: Pattaya, Thailand

Champions
- Men's singles: (Thailand) Suppanyu Avihingsanon
- Women's singles: (Singapore) Xing Aiying
- Men's doubles: (Singapore) Danny Bawa Chrisnanta (Indonesia) Fernando Kurniawan
- Women's doubles: (Chinese Taipei) Cheng Yu-jou (Chinese Taipei) Lee Tai-an
- Mixed doubles: (Indonesia) Hendra Setiawan (Indonesia) Debby Susanto

These are the results of 2025 BWF World Senior Championships' 35+ events.

== Competition schedule ==
Competition schedule was announced at 31 August 2025:

Key
| #R | #th round | QF | Quarter-finals | SF | Semi-finals | F | Final |

| Event | Sep 7 9:00 | Sep 8 9:00 | Sep 9 9:00 | Sep 10 9:00 | Sep 11 9:00 | Sep 12 10:00 | Sep 13 10:00 | Sep 14 10:00 |
|---|---|---|---|---|---|---|---|---|
| Men's singles | 1R | | 2R | 3R | 4R | QF | SF | F |
| Women's singles | | 1R | | 2R | 3R | QF | SF | F |
| Men's doubles | | 1R | | 2R | 3R | QF | SF | F |
| Women's doubles | | 1R | | 2R | 3R | QF | SF | F |
| Mixed doubles | 1R | | 2R | | 3R | QF | SF | F |

== Overview ==
Men's singles

Japan’s Makoto Aoyama, the reigning champion, will not return to defend his crown this year. All eyes are now on the top seed New Zealand’s Joe Wu, the reigning silver medalist, along with bronze medalists Derrick Ng of Canada and Thailand’s home favorite Tawan Huansuriya, as they battle for their first-ever title. Sri Lanka’s Niluka Karunaratne and Thailand’s Suppanyu Avihingsanon are also looking to make their mark as they make their tournament debut.

Women's singles

Only the silver medalist from the last edition, Thailand's Benjaporn Thienrajkij is in contention this year. Singapore’s Xing Aiying, the youngest winner in U.S. Open history and a 2008 Olympian, returns to lead the field, while Chinese Taipei’s Li Ai-ting makes her debut as the top seed.

Men's doubles

Just like the women's singles event, only the reigning silver medalists, Japan’s Yuki Homma and Masakazu Mouri, are competing in this edition as the top seed. Meanwhile, recently retired French star Brice Leverdez and Singapore’s Danny Bawa Chrisnanta are eyeing the top spot at the World Senior Championships.

Women's doubles

Thailand’s Molthia Kijanon, the reigning champion, gives up on regaining her second title, while compatriot Vacharaporn Munkit also enters as the 35+ mixed doubles title holder. Japan’s Kanako Jigami, last edition’s silver medalist, leads the field alongside Thailand’s bronze medalists Wasamon Chokuthaikul and Suttapa Ekworrathien, seeded first and second respectively. Adding to the spotlight, Indonesia’s Debby Susanto, the 2016 All England Open champion and mixed doubles specialist, makes her debut at the World Senior Championships.

Mixed doubles

Thailand’s Nawut Thanateeratam and Vacharaporn Munkit, the reigning mixed doubles champions, are back to defend their title for a second consecutive edition. Silver medalists Derrick Ng of Canada and Taiwanese-American Pai Hsiao-ma, along with bronze medalists Chanyut Suntiparaphop of Thailand and India’s Mohamed Rehan Raju and Anees Kowsar, are all looking to claim the top spot. Making the draw even more exciting, 1× Olympian and 4× BWF World Championships gold medalist Hendra Setiawan of Indonesia teams up with Debby Susanto as the second seed. Meanwhile, Sweden’s Michel Bachtiar, at 59 years old, is the oldest competitor in the category, adding experience to the mix.

== Summary ==
=== Medal table ===
* Host nation (Thailand)

2025 BWF World Senior Championships medal table
| Rank | Nation | Gold | Silver | Bronze | Total |
|---|---|---|---|---|---|
| 1 | Singapore | 1.5 | 0 | 2 | 3.5 |
| 2 | Indonesia | 1.5 | 0 | 0.5 | 2 |
| 3 | Thailand* | 1 | 1 | 2 | 4 |
| 4 | Chinese Taipei | 1 | 0 | 0 | 1 |
| 5 | Japan | 0 | 2 | 3 | 5 |
| 6 | France | 0 | 1 | 1 | 2 |
| 7 | Sri Lanka | 0 | 1 | 0 | 1 |
| 8 | Czech Republic | 0 | 0 | 1 | 1 |
| 9 | Scotland | 0 | 0 | 0.5 | 0.5 |
| Totals (9 entries) | | 5 | 5 | 10 | 20 |

=== Medalists ===
| Event | Gold | Silver | Bronze |
|---|---|---|---|
| Men's singles | (Thailand) Suppanyu Avihingsanon | (Sri Lanka) Niluka Karunaratne | (Singapore) Ashton Chen |
| Men's singles | (Thailand) Suppanyu Avihingsanon | (Sri Lanka) Niluka Karunaratne | (Japan) Kazunori Shiozawa |
| Women's singles | (Singapore) Xing Aiying | (Japan) Konomi Nomura | (Czech Republic) Martina Benešová |
| Women's singles | (Singapore) Xing Aiying | (Japan) Konomi Nomura | (Thailand) Piyarat Jarajapreedee |
| Men's doubles | (Singapore) Danny Bawa Chrisnanta (Indonesia) Fernando Kurniawan | (France) Laurent Constantin (France) Brice Leverdez | (Japan) Yuki Homma (Japan) Masakazu Mouri |
| Men's doubles | (Singapore) Danny Bawa Chrisnanta (Indonesia) Fernando Kurniawan | (France) Laurent Constantin (France) Brice Leverdez | (Thailand) Pattarajarin Sirikunakorn (Thailand) Thimmadee Teerakawong |
| Women's doubles | (Chinese Taipei) Cheng Yu-jou (Chinese Taipei) Lee Tai-an | (Japan) Saki Matsumura (Japan) Konomi Nomura | (Scotland) Jody Barral (Indonesia) Debby Susanto |
| Women's doubles | (Chinese Taipei) Cheng Yu-jou (Chinese Taipei) Lee Tai-an | (Japan) Saki Matsumura (Japan) Konomi Nomura | (Japan) Aya Asari (Japan) Yorika Kawata |
| Mixed doubles | (Indonesia) Hendra Setiawan^{‡} (Indonesia) Debby Susanto | (Thailand) Nawut Thanateeratam (Thailand) Vacharaporn Munkit | (Singapore) Danny Bawa Chrisnanta (Singapore) Xing Aiying |
| Mixed doubles | (Indonesia) Hendra Setiawan^{‡} (Indonesia) Debby Susanto | (Thailand) Nawut Thanateeratam (Thailand) Vacharaporn Munkit | (France) Brice Leverdez (France) Julie Leverdez |

== Participants ==
260 players from 32 nations competed at this edition of the championships:

Participants
| Australia (9) | Ankur Bhatia; Harsha Ravi; Jesse Lee; Jinu Varghese; Luke Chong; Masami Suzuki^{‡}; Subhash Aroiveettil; Vanra Chap; Vanrith Chap |
| Austria (2) | Christian Kraml; Martin Riedmann |
| Canada (10) | Arak Bhokanandh ^{‡}; Carol Fu ^{‡}; Crystal Ava Chow; Derrick Ng; Jensen Ly; Lindsay Reynolds; Mukunda Bhandari; My-Linh Diep ^{‡}; Tamil Muthu ^{‡}; Vong Kim |
| Chile (1) | Carlos Carvajal |
| Chinese Taipei (21) | Chao Chun-ken ^{‡}; Chen Tai-ying; Chen Yen-ting; Chen Yi-jing; Cheng Yu-chen ^{‡}; Cheng Yu-jou; Chiang Chia-hsuan; Fang Chih-yu; Hsu Chien-ching; Hu Ching-wen; Lee Chia-ling; Lee Tai-an; Li Ai-ting; Liu Bo-wei; Su Chih-hao; Szu Sheng-wen; Tsai Teng-ying; Wang Chih-kai ^{‡}; Wen Chou-yuan; Wu En-jin |
| Czech Republic (2) | Martina Benešová; Šárka Meier ^{‡} |
| Denmark (8) | Andreas Gefke; Christina Aagaard; Jacob Marcussen ^{‡}; Joan Christiansen; Lars Rüsz Kaysen; Mai Hasle; Michael Christensen; Ulla Pedersen ^{‡} |
| England (13) | David Poole; Ed Telfer; Hannah Seagraves; Karen Feng; Martin Crossley; Nick Hodgson; Nigel Tao; Olga Chernysheva ^{‡}; Pernille Woods; Sara Moore; Simon Parker; Victor Liew; William Hilton-Jackson |
| Finland (3) | Hannu Aro ^{‡}; Mikko Vikman; Paphon Kasemvudhi |
| France (22) | Antoine Charbonnet; Baptiste Carême; Bernard Tang; Brice Leverdez; Bruno Cazau; Carine Hiss; Charlène Verron; Clara Sellez; Elodie Boyer; Élodie Peroumal; Émeline Jooris; François Escola; Julie Leverdez ^{‡}; Karine Dio; Laurent Constantin; Lise Deneuville; Maily Turlan; Marie-Christelle Cochet; Robin Fesquet; Romain Martin; Swann Lenik; Yoann Turlan |
| Germany (13) | Alexander Strehse; Britta Hogrefe; Conny Paulsen; Fabian Dietrich ^{‡}; Katja Kirn; Kerstin Wagner; Lucas Paulsen; Nicole Bartsch; Nicole Schnurrer; Saruul Shafiq; Senja Dewes; Sonja Melzer; Stefanie Bannenberg |
| Hong Kong (13) | Cheng Kin Man; Cheung Chung Fai; Ching Pak Yin; Choi Yu Fei; Leung Chun Yiu; Leung Sze Pui; Liu Ka Yan; Tang Siu Kwan; Tang Wing Tung; Tong Tin Yau; Wong Ching Man; Wong Tsz Yin ^{‡}; Yu Kar Ming ^{?} |
| India (19) | ‡: Adarsh Kumar; Anees Kowsar; Anuj Dhand; Apparao Sarikonda; Dileep Chandramohanan; Himanshu Kharbanda; Jaswinder Singh; Jui Agaskar; K. K. Nimalekshmy; Mohamed Rehan Raju; Noopur Barve; Prabinu; Prem Singh Chouhan; S. Sanjeeth; Sahil Katlaria; Satinder Malik; Sayantika Dutta; Swati Sharma; Vinod Brahmanandan; ~~Sonal Jagdale~~ ^{w} |
| Indonesia (9) | Adhika Apriyanto Rusly; Anggie; Apdi Kurniawan; Debby Susanto; Edwind Sukamta; Fernando Kurniawan; Hendra Joseph; Hendra Setiawan ^{‡}; Teddy Gunawan |
| Japan (15) | Aya Asari; Kanako Jigami; Kazunori Shiozawa; Konomi Nomura; Masaharu Okawara ^{‡}; Masakazu Mouri; Miki Sawada ^{‡}; Naoki Koike; Noaki Matsumura; Nobuyuki Ishihara ^{‡}; Saki Matsumura; Shohei Nagayama; Yorika Kawata; Yui Minagawa; Yuki Homma ^{‡} |
| Macau (1) | Leong Kin Fai; ~~Lam Chi Man~~ ^{w} |
| Malaysia (11) | Chaang Kim Meng ^{‡}; Chin Chee Hiong ^{‡}; Connie Leong; Lim Fang Yang; Phoon Kah Yee; Rizal Misnan; Sayuati Faisal ^{‡}; See Phui Leng; Teo Kok Siang; Tey Soon Keong ^{‡}; Yusuf Yusriazmi ^{‡} |
| Mongolia (3) | Bazashkhan Bota; Erdenebayar Enkhbold; Zolzaya Munkhbaatar |
| New Zealand (1) | Joe Wu |
| Poland (9) | Agata Kornacka ^{‡}; Andrzej Gasz ^{‡}; Bartosz Motyka-Radłowski ^{‡}; Dominika Cygan ^{‡}; Izabela Pazyna ^{‡}; Maciej Ociepa; Magdalena Okupniak; Wojciech Poszelężny; Zbigniew Zimny |
| Romania (2) | Ionut Anton Banu ^{‡}; Tiberiu Iacomi |
| Scotland (1) | Jody Barral |
| Singapore (7) | Ashton Chen; Bryan Quek ^{‡}; Danny Bawa Chrisnanta; Liao Jun Wei; Muhamad Syafiq Lim; Tan Shin Hui ^{‡}; Xing Aiying |
| Slovakia (3) | Anton Kuzma; Jana Ferencová; Jarolím Vícen |
| Spain (5) | Álvaro Rangil ^{‡}; Beatriz Garcia ^{‡}; David Hernansanz ^{‡}; Elena Krasheninnikova; Marta Fernández |
| Sri Lanka (12) | Amila Kumara Perera; Amila Yatapana; Charith Wijenayaka; Dhanushika Gangani; Hasika Mahindarathe; Imandha Nimalchandra; Niluka Karunaratne; Prasanna Puhabugoda; Roshan Thommaya; Sumuda Kumarasinghe; Supun Lakranga; Umanga Rathnayake ^{‡} |
| Sweden (3) | Cathrine Andersson; Linda Saarela; Michel Bachtiar ^{‡} |
| Switzerland (6) | Iris Bless; Loïc Gothuey; Marc Lutz; Pranav Shashank Khot; Thomas Bless ^{‡}; Vicky Jenssens |
| Thailand (19) | Benjaporn Thienrajkij; Chanyut Suntiparaphop; Hiripongsathorn Phubate; Jakkit Tuntirasin; Nanthanat Thienrajkij; Nattanan Sareerasririt; Nawut Thanateeratam; Pattarajarin Sirikunakorn; Ping Phothiard; Piyarat Jarajapreedee; Suppanyu Avihingsanon; Suttapa Ekworrathien; Suwat Phaisansomsuk; Tawan Huansuriya; Thanita Chantarat; Thidarat Kleebyeesoon; Thimmadee Teerakawong; Vacharaporn Munkit; Wasamon Chokuthaikul; ~~Vararat Gatenakorn~~ ^{w} |
| Ukraine (1) | Olha Buvaieva |
| United Arab Emirates (14) | Alexey Ionov ^{‡}; Amritha Kuttikrishnan ^{‡}; Denny John; Hashik Hakkim; Jenalyn Dimaculangan; Manoj Karthikeyan ^{‡}; Marshab Mammu; Mohammed Junaid Abdulkhader; Nignesh Manikkoth; Rejesh Kannan; Suresh Babu Ganji; Suryanarayanan Jayashri; Thaliyilakkandi Akhilesh; Thekke Hamza |
| United States (2) | Curtis Stensland; Pai Hsiao-ma |
^‡ : Participant born before 1985; ^? : Unknown date of born; ^w : Withdrawn.

== Legends ==
| ^{‡} | Participant who born before 1985. |
| ^{?} | Unknown date of birth. |
| ^{r} | Retired during the match. |

== Men's singles ==
=== Seeds ===
1. (New Zealand) Joe Wu (second round)
2. (Canada) Derrick Ng (fourth round)
3. (Thailand) Tawan Huansuriya (third round)
4. (Japan) Masakazu Mouri (second round)
5. (Sri Lanka) Niluka Karunaratne (silver medalist)
6. (Poland) Maciej Ociepa (qurater-finals)
7. (Singapore) Ashton Chen (bronze medalist)
8. (Thailand) Suppanyu Avihingsanon (gold medalist)
9. (Denmark) Lars Rüsz Kaysen (second round)
10. (Macau) Lam Chi Man (withdrew)
11. (Hong Kong) Leung Chun Yiu (third round)
12. (Germany) Alexander Strehse (third round)
13. (France) Yoann Turlan (third round)
14. (Malaysia) Lim Fang Yang (fourth round)
15. (Denmark) Andreas Gefke (fourth round)
16. (Macau) Leong Kin Fai (fourth round)

=== Finals ===
Quarter-finals
(Sri Lanka) Roshan Thommaya | 8 | 6
5/8 | (Singapore) Ashton Chen | 21 | 21
(Germany) Lucas Paulsen | 14 | 8
5/8 | (Thailand) Suppanyu Avihingsanon | 21 | 21
5/8 | (Poland) Maciej Ociepa | 18 | 18
(Japan) Kazunori Shiozawa | 21 | 21
5/8 | (Sri Lanka) Niluka Karunaratne | 21 | 21
(Thailand) Nattanan Sareerasririt | 15 | 13

Semi-finals
5/8 | (Singapore) Ashton Chen | 14 | 21 | 18
5/8 | (Thailand) Suppanyu Avihingsanon | 21 | 14 | 21
(Japan) Kazunori Shiozawa | 15 | 17
5/8 | (Sri Lanka) Niluka Karunaratne | 21 | 21

Final
5/8 | (Thailand) Suppanyu Avihingsanon | 21 | 9 | 21
5/8 | (Sri Lanka) Niluka Karunaratne | 6 | 21 | 18

=== Top half ===
==== Section 1 ====
First round
(Sri Lanka) Thommaya | 21 | 21
(Chile) Carvajal | 7 | 8

Second round
1 | (New Zealand) Wu | 13 | 15
(Poland) Poszelężny | 21 | 21
(Chinese Taipei) Fang C-y | 21 | 21
(England) Parker | 10 | 10
9/16 | (Macau) Lam
(Canada) Kim | w | / | o
(France) Tang | 12 | 21 | 20
(Sri Lanka) Thommaya | 21 | 12 | 22

Third round
(Poland) Poszelężny | 21 | 14 | 14
(Chinese Taipei) Fang C-y | 19 | 21 | 21
(Canada) Kim | 12 | 13
(Sri Lanka) Thommaya | 21 | 21

Fourth round
(Chinese Taipei) Fang C-y | 20 | 19
(Sri Lanka) Thommaya | 22 | 21

==== Section 2 ====
First round
(Australia) Vanra Chap | 10 | 9
(United Arab Emirates) Hakkim | 21 | 21

Second round
5/8 | (Singapore) Chen | 21 | 21
(Japan) Okawara^{‡} | 12 | 5
(Hong Kong) Cheng | 10 | 21 | 21
(India) Chouhan | 21 | 11 | 9
9/16 | (Malaysia) Lim | 21 | 21
(Germany) Dietrich^{‡} | 5 | 4
(Thailand) Phothiard | 21 | 21
(United Arab Emirates) Hakkim | 17 | 14

Third round
5/8 | (Singapore) Chen | 21 | 21
(Hong Kong) Cheng | 8 | 6
9/16 | (Malaysia) Lim | 21 | 21
(Thailand) Phothiard | 11 | 19

Fourth round
5/8 | (Singapore) Chen | 14 | 21 | 21
9/16 | (Malaysia) Lim | 21 | 13 | 6

==== Section 3 ====
First round
(Indonesia) Sukamta | 14 | 21
(Switzerland) Lutz | 21 | 23

Second round
3/4 | (Japan) Mouri | 19 | 15
(Chinese Taipei) Su C-h | 21 | 21
(Australia) Chong | 12 | 9
(Germany) Paulsen | 21 | 21
9/16 | (Denmark) Gefke | 21 | 21
(Canada) Bhandari | 10 | 5
(Austria) Riedmann | 5 | 12
(Switzerland) Lutz | 21 | 21

Third round
(Chinese Taipei) Su C-h | 11 | 13
(Germany) Paulsen | 21 | 21
9/16 | (Denmark) Gefke | 19 | 21 | 21
(Switzerland) Lutz | 21 | 11 | 17

Fourth round
(Germany) Paulsen | w | / | o
9/16 | (Denmark) Gefke

==== Section 4 ====
First round
(Hong Kong) Ching | 13 | 5
(Slovakia) Vicen | 21 | 21

Second round
5/8 | (Thailand) Avihingsanon | 21 | 21
(Mongolia) Munkhbaatar | 6 | 6
(India) Malik | 21 | 21
(Sri Lanka) Lakranga | 7 | 10
9/16 | (France) Turlan | 21 | 21
(United Arab Emirates) John | 13 | 6
(England) Poole | 10 | 7
(Slovakia) Vicen | 21 | 21

Third round
5/8 | (Thailand) Avihingsanon | 21 | 21
(India) Malik | 8 | 10
9/16 | (France) Turlan | 14 | 21 | 17
(Slovakia) Vicen | 21 | 14 | 21

Fourth round
5/8 | (Thailand) Avihingsanon | 21 | 21
(Slovakia) Vicen | 11 | 12

=== Bottom half ===
==== Section 5 ====
First round
(Hong Kong) Yu^{?} | 21 | 21
(United Arab Emirates) Ganji | 10 | 17
(England) Hilton-Jackson | 21 | 11
(Malaysia) Misnan | 16 | 5^{r}

Second round
(Hong Kong) Yu^{?} | 10 | 21 | 8
(Chinese Taipei) Szu S-w | 21 | 18 | 21
(India) Singh | 21 | 21
9/16 | (Denmark) Kaysen | 17 | 15
(England) Hilton-Jackson | 21 | 21
(United States) Stensland | 19 | 13
(Switzerland) Gothuey | 19 | 18
5/8 | (Poland) Ociepa | 21 | 21

Third round
(Chinese Taipei) Szu S-w | 16 | 21 | 21
(India) Singh | 21 | 7 | 15
(England) Hilton-Jackson | 7 | 12
5/8 | (Poland) Ociepa | 21 | 21

Fourth round
(Chinese Taipei) Szu S-w | 21 | 17 | 19
5/8 | (Poland) Ociepa | 18 | 21 | 21

==== Section 6 ====
First round
(Germany) Shafiq | 21 | 21
(Indonesia) Gunawan | 14 | 16

Second round
(Germany) Shafiq | 21 | 21
(Australia) Vanrith Chap | 11 | 14
(France) Escola | 10 | 16
9/16 | (Macau) Leong | 21 | 21
(Japan) Shiozawa | 21 | 21
(Canada) Ly | 13 | 9
(Sri Lanka) Wijenayaka | 1 | 9
3/4 | (Thailand) Huansuriya | 21 | 21

Third round
(Germany) Shafiq | 21 | 13 | 16
9/16 | (Macau) Leong | 17 | 21 | 21
(Japan) Shiozawa | 21 | 21
3/4 | (Thailand) Huansuriya | 15 | 11

Fourth round
9/16 | (Macau) Leong | 9 | 16
(Japan) Shiozawa | 21 | 21

==== Section 7 ====
First round
(Singapore) Liao | 8 | 10
(Denmark) Christensen | 21 | 21

Second round
(Denmark) Christensen | 21 | 14
(India) Katlaria | 23 | 21
(Japan) Nagayama^{‡} | 21 | 13 | 18
9/16 | (Germany) Strehse | 12 | 21 | 21
(Austria) Kraml | 21 | 21
(Romania) Iacomi | 13 | 16
(Australia) Aroliveettil | 4 | 6
5/8 | (Sri Lanka) Karunaratne | 21 | 21

Third round
(India) Katlaria | 21 | 21
9/16 | (Germany) Strehse | 19 | 16
(Austria) Kraml | 2 | 6
5/8 | (Sri Lanka) Karunaratne | 21 | 21

Fourth round
(India) Katlaria | 17 | 18
5/8 | (Sri Lanka) Karunaratne | 21 | 21

==== Section 8 ====
First round
(Thailand) Sareerasririt | 21 | 21
(England) Crossley | 15 | 10

Second round
(Thailand) Sareerasririt | 21 | 21
(United Arab Emirates) Kannan | 11 | 5
(Poland) Zimny | 8 | 10
9/16 | (Hong Kong) Leung | 21 | 21
(Malaysia) Chaang^{‡} | 7 | 6
(France) Lenik | 21 | 21
(Indonesia) Anggie | 3 | 13
2 | (Canada) Ng | 21 | 21

Third round
(Thailand) Sareerasririt | 21 | 17 | 21
9/16 | (Hong Kong) Leung | 17 | 21 | 5
(France) Lenik | 15 | 17
2 | (Canada) Ng | 21 | 21

Fourth round
(Thailand) Sareerasririt | 21 | 18 | 21
2 | (Canada) Ng | 19 | 21 | 11

== Women's singles ==
=== Seeds ===
1. (Chinese Taipei) Li Ai-ting (third round)
2. (Singapore) Xing Aiying (gold medalist)
3. (Czech Republic) Martina Benešová (bronze medalist)
4. (Japan) Kanako Jigami (quarter-finals)
5. (Sweden) Cathrine Andersson (second round)
6. (Thailand) Suttapa Ekworrathien (third round)
7. (Germany) Britta Hogrefe (third round)
8. (Germany) Stefanie Bannenberg (second round)

=== Finals ===
Semi-finals
(Japan) Konomi Nomura | 21 | 21
3/4 | (Czech Republic) Martina Benešová | 13 | 9
(Thailand) Piyarat Jarajapreedee | 11 | 6
2 | (Singapore) Xing Aiying | 21 | 21

Final
(Japan) Konomi Nomura | 18 | 13
2 | (Singapore) Xing Aiying | 21 | 21

=== Top half ===
==== Section 1 ====
First round
(Spain) Fernández | 12 | 8
(Japan) Nomura | 21 | 21

Second round
1 | (Chinese Taipei) Li A-t | 21 | 26
(Germany) Kirn | 9 | 24
(India) Sharma | 21 | 21
(Thailand) Thienrajkij | 13 | 12
5/8 | (Sweden) Andersson | 11 | 16
(Hong Kong) Liu | 21 | 21
(France) Dio | 6 | 6
(Japan) Nomura | 21 | 21

Third round
1 | (Chinese Taipei) Li A-t | 21 | 11 | 16
(India) Sharma | 9 | 21 | 21
(Hong Kong) Liu | 5 | 3
(Japan) Nomura | 21 | 21

Final
(India) Sharma | 8 | 7
(Japan) Nomura | 21 | 21

==== Section 2 ====
First round
(Japan) Asari | 22 | 21 | 17
(Sri Lanka) Gangani | 24 | 16 | 21
(France) Cochet | 21 | 17 | 21
(India) Dutta | 9 | 21 | 10

Second round
3/4 | (Czech Republic) Benešová | 21 | 21
(Thailand) Chantarat | 5 | 13
(Poland) Okupniak | 21 | 21
(Sri Lanka) Gangani | 18 | 16
5/8 | (Germany) Bannenberg | 13 | 21 | 15
(Malaysia) Leong | 21 | 11 | 21
(England) Seagraves | 19 | 18
(France) Cochet | 21 | 21

Third round
3/4 | (Czech Republic) Benešová | 21 | 21
(Poland) Okupniak | 7 | 10
(Malaysia) Leong | 21 | 21
(France) Cochet | 13 | 6

Final
3/4 | (Czech Republic) Benešová | 21 | 21
(Malaysia) Leong | 4 | 9

=== Bottom half ===
==== Section 3 ====
First round
(Switzerland) Bless | 5 | 6
(Thailand) Jarajapreedee | 21 | 21
(Hong Kong) Tang | 21 | 21
(Chinese Taipei) Tsai T-y | 16 | 11

Second round
(Thailand) Jarajapreedee | 21 | 21
(India) Nimalekshmy | 15 | 15
(England) Feng | 10 | 6
5/8 | (Germany) Hogrefe | 21 | 21
(Hong Kong) Tang | 21 | 21
(Spain) Krasheninnikova | 4 | 8
(France) Peroumal | 9 | 12
3/4 | (Japan) Jigami | 21 | 21

Third round
(Thailand) Jarajapreedee | 21 | 21
5/8 | (Germany) Hogrefe | 9 | 8
(Hong Kong) Tang | 16 | 21 | 19
3/4 | (Japan) Jigami | 21 | 16 | 21

Final
(Thailand) Jarajapreedee | 18 | 22 | 21
3/4 | (Japan) Jigami | 21 | 20 | 15

==== Section 4 ====
First round
(Japan) Kawata | 21 | 21
(Germany) Schnurrer | 14 | 15

Second round
(Japan) Kawata | 21 | 21
(Chinese Taipei) Chiang C-h | 16 | 16
(France) Jooris | 4 | 6
5/8 | (Thailand) Ekworrathien | 21 | 21
(Ukraine) Buvaieva | 20 | 21 | 22
(Sweden) Saarela | 22 | 14 | 20
(India) Jagdale
2 | (Singapore) Xing | w | / | o

Third round
(Japan) Kawata | 21 | 19 | 21
5/8 | (Thailand) Ekworrathien | 19 | 21 | 15
(Ukraine) Buvaieva | 8 | 3
2 | (Singapore) Xing | 21 | 21

Final
(Japan) Kawata | 4 | 6
2 | (Singapore) Xing | 21 | 21

== Men's doubles ==
=== Seeds ===
1. (Japan) Yuki Homma / Masakazu Mouri (bronze medalist)
2. (France) Baptiste Carême / Bruno Cazau (second round)
3. (France) Laurent Constantin / Brice Leverdez (silver medalist)
4. (Singapore) Danny Bawa Chrisnanta / (Indonesia) Fernando Kurniawan (gold medalist)
5. (Chinese Taipei) Chao Chun-ken ^{[SUB]} / (Macau) Leong Kin Fai (third round)
6. (Hong Kong) Leung Chun Yiu / Wong Tsz Yin (quarter-finals)
7. (Thailand) Hiripongsathorn Phubate / Nawut Thanateeratam (quarter-finals)
8. (Canada) Derrick Ng / (United States) Curtis Stensland (quarter-finals)

=== Replacement ===
1. (Macau) Lam Chi Man was replaced by (Chinese Taipei) Chao Chun-ken.

=== Finals ===
Semi-finals
1 | (Japan) Yuki Homma^{‡} (Japan) Masakazu Mouri | 16 | 10
3/4 | (France) Laurent Constantin (France) Brice Leverdez | 21 | 21
3/4 | (Singapore) Danny Bawa Chrisnanta (Indonesia) Fernando Kurniawan | 21 | 21
(Thailand) Pattarajarin Sirikunakorn (Thailand) Thimmadee Teerakawong | 13 | 12

Final
3/4 | (France) Laurent Constantin (France) Brice Leverdez | 14 | 16
3/4 | (Singapore) Danny Bawa Chrisnanta (Indonesia) Fernando Kurniawan | 21 | 21

=== Top half ===
==== Section 1 ====
First round
(Switzerland) Gothuey (Switzerland) Khot^{‡} | 21 | 21
(United Arab Emirates) Ionov^{‡} (United Arab Emirates) Karthikeyan^{‡} | 12 | 16
(Canada) Kim (Canada) Muthu^{‡} | 9 | 5
(Chinese Taipei) Su C-h (Chinese Taipei) Yu T-j | 21 | 21
(Thailand) Huansuriya (Thailand) Suntiparaphop | 21 | 21
(England) Hilton-Jackson (England) Hodgson | 11 | 7
(India) Dhand (India) Kharbanda | 21 | 21
(Sri Lanka) Kumarasinghe (Sri Lanka) Perera | 8 | 14
(Indonesia) Gunawan (Indonesia) Sukamta | 16 | 17
(Australia) Bhatia (Australia) Varghese | 21 | 21
(Hong Kong) Tang (Hong Kong) Tong | 21 | 21
(France) Charbonnet (France) Fesquet | 16 | 6

Second round
1 | (Japan) Homma^{‡} (Japan) Mouri | 21 | 21
(Switzerland) Gothuey (Switzerland) Khot^{‡} | 5 | 7
(Chinese Taipei) Su C-h (Chinese Taipei) Yu T-j | 14 | 21 | 21
(Thailand) Huansuriya (Thailand) Suntiparaphop | 21 | 11 | 19
5/8 | (Chinese Taipei) Chao C-k ^{[SUB]} (Macau) Leong | 21 | 13 | 21
(India) Dhand (India) Kharbanda | 12 | 21 | 14
(Australia) Bhatia (Australia) Varghese | 16 | 10
(Hong Kong) Tang (Hong Kong) Tong | 21 | 21

Third round
1 | (Japan) Homma^{‡} (Japan) Mouri | 21 | 21
(Chinese Taipei) Su C-h (Chinese Taipei) Yu T-j | 17 | 19
5/8 | (Chinese Taipei) Chao C-k ^{[SUB]} (Macau) Leong | 21 | 17 | 27
(Hong Kong) Tang (Hong Kong) Tong | 14 | 21 | 29

Quarter-finals
1 | (Japan) Homma^{‡} (Japan) Mouri | 20 | 21 | 21
(Hong Kong) Tang (Hong Kong) Tong | 22 | 17 | 14

==== Section 2 ====
First round
(Sri Lanka) Mahindarathe^{‡} (Sri Lanka) Nimalchandra | 13 | 4
(Chinese Taipei) Chen Y-t (Chinese Taipei) Wen C-y | 21 | 21
(England) Poole (England) Telfer | 21 | 21
(Australia) Chong (Australia) Lee | 18 | 11
(India) Brahmanandan (India) Chandramohanan | 21 | 21
(Indonesia) Joseph^{‡} (Indonesia) A. Kurniawan | 16 | 7
5/8 | (Canada) Ng (United States) Stensland | 21 | 21
(Japan) Ishihara^{‡} (Japan) Okawara^{‡} | 13 | 16
(United Arab Emirates) Abdulkhader (United Arab Emirates) John | 14 | 20
(Hong Kong) Cheng (Hong Kong) Yu^{?} | 21 | 21
(Poland) Gasz^{‡} (Poland) Poszelężny | 21 | 19 | 18
(Malaysia) Faisal^{‡} (Malaysia) Yusriazmi^{‡} | 10 | 21 | 21
(Thailand) Avihingsanon (Thailand) Phaisansomsuk | 21 | 21
(Finland) Kasemvudhi (Finland) Vikman | 15 | 9

Second round
3/4 | (France) Constantin (France) Leverdez | 21 | 22
(Chinese Taipei) Chen Y-t (Chinese Taipei) Wen C-y | 10 | 22
(England) Poole (England) Telfer | 19 | 21 | 19
(India) Brahmanandan (India) Chandramohanan | 21 | 15 | 21
5/8 | (Canada) Ng (United States) Stensland | 21 | 21
(Hong Kong) Cheng (Hong Kong) Yu^{?} | 15 | 17
(Malaysia) Faisal^{‡} (Malaysia) Yusriazmi^{‡} | 11 | 8
(Thailand) Avihingsanon (Thailand) Phaisansomsuk | 21 | 21

Third round
3/4 | (France) Constantin (France) Leverdez | 21 | 21
(India) Brahmanandan (India) Chandramohanan | 8 | 13
5/8 | (Canada) Ng (United States) Stensland | 21 | 21
(Thailand) Avihingsanon (Thailand) Phaisansomsuk | 17 | 19

Quarter-finals
3/4 | (France) Constantin (France) Leverdez | 18 | 27 | 21
5/8 | (Canada) Ng (United States) Stensland | 21 | 25 | 16

=== Bottom half ===
==== Section 3 ====
First round
(United Arab Emirates) Akhilesh (United Arab Emirates) Hamza | 21 | 21
(Denmark) Christensen (Poland) Zimny | 18 | 11
(Slovakia) Kuzma (Slovakia) Vícen | 14 | 12
(Denmark) Gefke (Denmark) Kaysen | 21 | 21
(Hong Kong) Cheung^{‡} (Hong Kong) Choi | 21 | 16 | 21
(Indonesia) Anggie (Indonesia) Rusly | 14 | 21 | 18
(Canada) Bhokanandh^{‡} (Canada) Ly | 17 | 16
5/8 | (Thailand) Phubate (Thailand) Thanateeratam | 21 | 21
(Singapore) Quek^{‡} (Malaysia) Tey^{‡} | 10 | 9
(Australia) Aroliveettil (Australia) Ravi | 21 | 21
(France) Martin (France) Turlan | 21 | 21
(Romania) Banu^{‡} (Romania) Iacomi | 5 | 7
(Austria) Kraml (Austria) Riedmann | 8 | 7
(England) Liew (England) Tao | 21 | 21

Second round
(United Arab Emirates) Akhilesh (United Arab Emirates) Hamza | 15 | 12
(Denmark) Gefke (Denmark) Kaysen | 21 | 21
(Hong Kong) Cheung^{‡} (Hong Kong) Choi | 10 | 18
5/8 | (Thailand) Phubate (Thailand) Thanateeratam | 21 | 21
(Australia) Aroliveettil (Australia) Ravi | 21 | 15 | 15
(France) Martin (France) Turlan | 17 | 21 | 21
(England) Liew (England) Tao | 11 | 7
3/4 | (Singapore) Chrisnanta (Indonesia) F. Kurniawan | 21 | 21

Third round
(Denmark) Gefke (Denmark) Kaysen | 11 | 16
5/8 | (Thailand) Phubate (Thailand) Thanateeratam | 21 | 21
(France) Martin (France) Turlan | 13 | 15
3/4 | (Singapore) Chrisnanta (Indonesia) F. Kurniawan | 21 | 21

Quarter-finals
5/8 | (Thailand) Phubate (Thailand) Thanateeratam | 21 | 16 | 16
3/4 | (Singapore) Chrisnanta (Indonesia) F. Kurniawan | 15 | 21 | 21

==== Section 4 ====
First round
(Switzerland) Bless^{‡} (Switzerland) Lutz | 21 | 21
(Malaysia) Chin^{‡} (Malaysia) Teo | 16 | 14
(Australia) Vanra Chap (Australia) Vanrith Chap | 17 | 12
(Sri Lanka) Lakranga (Sri Lanka) Thommaya | 21 | 21
(Chinese Taipei) Hsu C-c (Chinese Taipei) Liu B-w | 21 | 21
(England) Crossley (England) Parker | 14 | 19
(Singapore) Liao (Singapore) Lim | 8 | 15
(India) Kumar (India) Sanjeeth | 21 | 21
(Germany) Paulsen (Germany) Strehse | 21 | 19 | 11
(Japan) Koike (Japan) Shiozawa | 19 | 21 | 21
(Thailand) Sirikunakorn (Thailand) Teerakawong | 21 | 21
(United Arab Emirates) Mammu (United Arab Emirates) Manikkoth | 6 | 16

Second round
(Switzerland) Bless^{‡} (Switzerland) Lutz | 24 | 23
(Sri Lanka) Lakranga (Sri Lanka) Thommaya | 22 | 21
(Chinese Taipei) Hsu C-c (Chinese Taipei) Liu B-w | 18 | 15
5/8 | (Hong Kong) Leung (Hong Kong) Wong^{‡} | 21 | 21
(India) Kumar (India) Sanjeeth | 21 | 17 | 7
(Japan) Koike (Japan) Shiozawa | 17 | 21 | 21
(Thailand) Sirikunakorn (Thailand) Teerakawong | 21 | 21
2 | (France) Carême (France) Cazau | 14 | 15

Third round
(Switzerland) Bless^{‡} (Switzerland) Lutz | 18 | 9
5/8 | (Hong Kong) Leung (Hong Kong) Wong^{‡} | 21 | 21
(Japan) Koike (Japan) Shiozawa | 19 | 18
(Thailand) Sirikunakorn (Thailand) Teerakawong | 21 | 21

Quarter-finals
5/8 | (Hong Kong) Leung (Hong Kong) Wong^{‡} | 13 | 21 | 19
(Thailand) Sirikunakorn (Thailand) Teerakawong | 21 | 15 | 21

== Women's doubles ==
=== Seeds ===
1. (Japan) Kanako Jigami / Miki Sawada (third round)
2. (Thailand) Wasamon Chokuthaikul / Suttapa Ekworrathien (quarter-finals)
3. (Germany) Stefanie Bannenberg / Britta Hogrefe (second round)
4. (Scotland) Jody Barral / (Indonesia) Debby Susanto (bronze medalist)
5. (Sweden) Cathrine Andersson / Linda Saarela (second round)
6. (Denmark) Christina Aagaard / Joan Christiansen (third round)
7. (Germany) Nicole Bartsch / Nicole Schnurrer (second round)
8. (Denmark) Mai Hasle / Ulla Pedersen (third round)

=== Finals ===
Semi-finals
(Chinese Taipei) Cheng Yu-jou (Chinese Taipei) Lee Tai-an | 21 | 21
3/4 | (Scotland) Jody Barral (Indonesia) Debby Susanto^{‡} | 14 | 19
(Japan) Aya Asari (Japan) Yorika Kawata | 14 | 10
(Japan) Saki Matsumura (Japan) Konomi Nomura | 21 | 21

Final
(Chinese Taipei) Cheng Yu-jou (Chinese Taipei) Lee Tai-an | 21 | 19 | 21
(Japan) Saki Matsumura (Japan) Konomi Nomura | 15 | 21 | 17

=== Top half ===
==== Section 1 ====
First round
(Canada) Chow (Canada) Fu^{‡} | 21 | 21
(France) Hiss (France) Peroumal | 18 | 14

Second round
1 | (Japan) Jigami (Japan) Sawada^{‡} | w | / | o
(India) Barve (India) Jagdale
(Chinese Taipei) Cheng Y-j (Chinese Taipei) Lee T-a | 21 | 21
(Malaysia) Leong (Malaysia) Phoon | 19 | 12
5/8 | (Germany) Bartsch^{‡} (Germany) Schnurrer | 21 | 20 | 15
(Hong Kong) Leung (Hong Kong) Tang | 15 | 22 | 21
(Thailand) Gatenakorn (Thailand) Jarajapreedee
(Canada) Chow (Canada) Fu^{‡} | w | / | o

Third round
1 | (Japan) Jigami (Japan) Sawada^{‡} | 14 | 17
(Chinese Taipei) Cheng Y-j (Chinese Taipei) Lee T-a | 21 | 21
(Hong Kong) Leung (Hong Kong) Tang | 21 | 21
(Canada) Chow (Canada) Fu^{‡} | 12 | 12

Quarter-finals
(Chinese Taipei) Cheng Y-j (Chinese Taipei) Lee T-a | 21 | 21
(Hong Kong) Leung (Hong Kong) Tang | 16 | 15

==== Section 2 ====
First round
(Chinese Taipei) Cheng Y-c^{‡} (Chinese Taipei) Lee C-l | 7 | 6
(Thailand) B. Thienrajkij (Thailand) N. Thienrajkij | 21 | 21
(United Arab Emirates) Dimaculangan (United Arab Emirates) Kuttikrishnan^{‡} | 8 | 5
(India) Prabinu (India) Nimalekshmy | 21 | 21

Second round
3/4 | (Scotland) Barral (Indonesia) Susanto^{‡} | 21 | 21
(Spain) Fernández (Spain) Garcia^{‡} | 8 | 3
(France) Dio (France) Sellez | 10 | 19
(Thailand) B. Thienrajkij (Thailand) N. Thienrajkij | 21 | 21
5/8 | (Denmark) Hasle (Denmark) Pedersen | 21 | 21
(England) Chernysheva^{‡} (England) Moore | 14 | 14
(Germany) Kirn (Germany) Melzer | 21 | 21
(India) Prabinu (India) Nimalekshmy | 19 | 13

Third round
3/4 | (Scotland) Barral (Indonesia) Susanto^{‡} | 21 | 21
(Thailand) B. Thienrajkij (Thailand) N. Thienrajkij | 12 | 12
5/8 | (Denmark) Hasle (Denmark) Pedersen | 21 | 18 | 11
(Germany) Kirn (Germany) Melzer | 11 | 21 | 21

Quarter-finals
3/4 | (Scotland) Barral (Indonesia) Susanto^{‡} | 21 | 21
(Germany) Kirn (Germany) Melzer | 5 | 9

=== Bottom half ===
==== Section 3 ====
First round
(Czech Republic) Benešová (Czech Republic) Meier^{‡} | 21 | 21
(England) Seagravers (England) Woods | 11 | 10
(Chinese Taipei) Chen Y-j (Chinese Taipei) Chiang C-h | 19 | 12
(India) Kowsar (India) Sharma | 21 | 21

Second round
(Czech Republic) Benešová (Czech Republic) Meier^{‡} | 21 | 21
(France) Deneuville (France) Leverdez^{‡} | 13 | 17
(Japan) Asari (Japan) Kawata | 21 | 21
5/8 | (Sweden) Andersson (Sweden) Saarela | 6 | 12
(India) Kowsar (India) Sharma | 21 | 17 | 21
(England) Feng (Switzerland) Jenssens | 8 | 21 | 14
(Hong Kong) Liu (Hong Kong) Wong | 21 | 21
3/4 | (Germany) Bannenberg (Germany) Hogrefe | 18 | 13

Third round
(Czech Republic) Benešová (Czech Republic) Meier^{‡} | 7 | 17
(Japan) Asari (Japan) Kawata | 21 | 21
(India) Kowsar (India) Sharma | 18 | 8
(Hong Kong) Liu (Hong Kong) Wong | 21 | 21

Quarter-finals
(Japan) Asari (Japan) Kawata | 21 | 21
(Hong Kong) Liu (Hong Kong) Wong | 16 | 12

==== Section 4 ====
First round
(Japan) Matsumura (Japan) Nomura | 21 | 21
(India) Agaskar (India) Dutta | 5 | 10

Second round
(Japan) Matsumura (Japan) Nomura | 21 | 21
(Chinese Taipei) Chen T-y (Chinese Taipei) Hu C-w | 3 | 15
(France) Tulan (France) Verron | 8 | 15
5/8 | (Denmark) Aargaard^{‡} (Denmark) Christiansen | 21 | 21
(Poland) Cygan^{‡} (Poland) Okupniak | 22 | 19
(Germany) Dewes^{‡} (Germany) Wagner | 24 | 21
(Ukraine) Buvaieva (Spain) Krasheninnikova | 5 | 10
2 | (Thailand) Chokuthaikul (Thailand) Ekworrathien | 21 | 21

Third round
(Japan) Matsumura (Japan) Nomura | 21 | 17 | 21
5/8 | (Denmark) Aargaard^{‡} (Denmark) Christiansen | 18 | 21 | 16
(Germany) Dewes^{‡} (Germany) Wagner | 18 | 11
2 | (Thailand) Chokuthaikul (Thailand) Ekworrathien | 21 | 21

Quarter-finals
(Japan) Matsumura (Japan) Nomura | 21 | 21
2 | (Thailand) Chokuthaikul (Thailand) Ekworrathien | 17 | 8

== Mixed doubles ==
=== Seeds ===
1. (Thailand) Nawut Thanateeratam / Vacharaporn Munkit (silver medalist)
2. (Indonesia) Hendra Setiawan / Debby Susanto (gold medalist)
3. (France) Laurent Constantin / Maily Turlan (second round)
4. (Canada) Derrick Ng / (United States) Pai Hsiao-ma (quarter-finals)
5. (Singapore) Danny Bawa Chrisnanta / Xing Aiying (bronze medalist)
6. (India) Mohamed Rehan Raju / Anees Kowsar (third round)
7. (Thailand) Chanyut Suntiparaphop / Piyarat Jarajapreedee (quarter-finals)
8. (France) Brice Leverdez / Julie Leverdez (bronze medalist)

=== Finals ===
Semi-finals
1 | (Thailand) Nawut Thanateeratam (Thailand) Vacharaporn Munkit | 17 | 21 | 21
5/8 | (Singapore) Danny Bawa Chrisnanta (Singapore) Xing Aiying | 21 | 11 | 10
5/8 | (France) Brice Leverdez (France) Julie Leverdez^{‡} | 11 | 10
2 | (Indonesia) Hendra Setiawan^{‡} (Indonesia) Debby Susanto | 21 | 21

Final
1 | (Thailand) Nawut Thanateeratam (Thailand) Vacharaporn Munkit | 5 | 9
2 | (Indonesia) Hendra Setiawan^{‡} (Indonesia) Debby Susanto | 21 | 21

=== Top half ===
==== Section 1 ====
First round
(Germany) Strehse (Germany) Schnurrer | 21 | 21
(United Arab Emirates) Abdulkhader (United Arab Emirates) Dimaculangan | 13 | 14
(Sri Lanka) Puhabugoda (Sri Lanka) Rathnayake^{‡} | 21 | 21
(Sweden) Bachtiar^{‡} (Sweden) Andersson | 15 | 19
(Poland) Motyka-Radłowski^{‡} (Poland) Pazyna^{‡} | 14 | 13
(Chinese Taipei) Liu B-w (Chinese Taipei) Chen T-y | 21 | 21
(France) Martin (France) Deneuville | 16 | 21 | 16
(England) Hilton-Jackson (England) Seagraves | 21 | 17 | 21
(Switzerland) Khot^{‡} (Switzerland) Jenssens | 10 | 9
(Hong Kong) Tong (Hong Kong) Liu | 21 | 21
(Malaysia) Misnan (Malaysia) See^{‡} | 10 | 14
(Japan) Mouri (Japan) Sawada^{‡} | 21 | 21

Second round
1 | (Thailand) Thanateeratam (Thailand) Munkit | 21 | 23
(Germany) Strehse (Germany) Schnurrer | 10 | 21
(Sri Lanka) Puhabugoda (Sri Lanka) Rathnayake^{‡} | 21 | 17 | 7
(Chinese Taipei) Liu B-w (Chinese Taipei) Chen T-y | 18 | 21 | 21
5/8 | (India) Raju (India) Kowsar | 21 | 21
(England) Hilton-Jackson (England) Seagraves | 6 | 19
(Hong Kong) Tong (Hong Kong) Liu | 12 | 18
(Japan) Mouri (Japan) Sawada^{‡} | 21 | 21

Third round
1 | (Thailand) Thanateeratam (Thailand) Munkit | 21 | 21
(Chinese Taipei) Liu B-w (Chinese Taipei) Chen T-y | 12 | 17
5/8 | (India) Raju (India) Kowsar | 21 | 13 | 16
(Japan) Mouri (Japan) Sawada^{‡} | 18 | 21 | 21

Quarter-finals
1 | (Thailand) Thanateeratam (Thailand) Munkit | 21 | 19 | 21
(Japan) Mouri (Japan) Sawada^{‡} | 17 | 21 | 19

==== Section 2 ====
First round
(Canada) Ly (Canada) Chow | 21 | 21
(England) Crossley (England) Moore | 18 | 15
(Malaysia) Lim (Singapore) Tan^{‡} | 21 | 21
(Germany) Dietrich^{‡} (Germany) Melzer | 17 | 10
(Chinese Taipei) Wu E-j^{‡} (Chinese Taipei) Chen Y-j | 12 | 19
(India) Malik (India) Barve | 21 | 21
(Denmark) Marcussen^{‡} (Denmark) Christiansen | 13 | 22
(Indonesia) Kurniawan (Canada) Reynolds^{‡} | 21 | 24
(Thailand) Tuntirasin (Thailand) Kleebyeesoon | 21 | 21
(Japan) N. Matsumura (Japan) S. Matsumura | 16 | 15
(Hong Kong) Choi (Hong Kong) Wong | 21 | 21
(Spain) Hernansanz^{‡} (Spain) Krasheninnikova | 4 | 8

Second round
3/4 | (France) Constantin (France) Turlan | 15 | 11
(Canada) Ly (Canada) Chow | 21 | 21
(Malaysia) Lim (Singapore) Tan^{‡} | 19 | 21
(India) Malik (India) Barve | 21 | 23
5/8 | (Singapore) Chrisnanta (Singapore) Xing | 12 | 21 | 21
(Indonesia) Kurniawan (Canada) Reynolds^{‡} | 21 | 12 | 17
(Thailand) Tuntirasin (Thailand) Kleebyeesoon | 21 | 21
(Hong Kong) Choi (Hong Kong) Wong | 13 | 10

Third round
(Canada) Ly (Canada) Chow | 10 | 21 | 13
(India) Malik (India) Barve | 21 | 14 | 21
5/8 | (Singapore) Chrisnanta (Singapore) Xing | 23 | 21
(Thailand) Tuntirasin (Thailand) Kleebyeesoon | 21 | 11

Quarter-finals
(India) Malik (India) Barve | 11 | 11
5/8 | (Singapore) Chrisnanta (Singapore) Xing | 21 | 21

=== Bottom half ===
==== Section 3 ====
First round
(England) Hodgson (Denmark) Hasle | 21 | 21
(Canada) Bhokanandh^{‡} (Scotland) Barral | 17 | 16
(Poland) Poszelężny (Poland) Okipniak | 21 | 21
(Denmark) Kaysen (Poland) Kornacka^{‡} | 19 | 16
(Thailand) Phubate (Thailand) Gatenakorn
(India) Sarikonda (India) Prabinu | w | / | o
(Mongolia) Enkhbold (Mongolia) Bota | 7 | 9
5/8 | (France) B. Leverdez (France) J. Leverdez^{‡} | 21 | 21
(Germany) L. Paulsen (Germany) C. Paulsen | 21 | 21
(Finland) Aro^{‡} (Ukraine) Buvaieva | 7 | 11
(Switzerland) Lutz (Switzerland) Bless | 18 | 21 | 8
(England) Parker (England) Woods | 21 | 15 | 21
(Japan) Koike (Japan) Minagawa | 21 | 21
(Chinese Taipei) Wen C-y (Chinese Taipei) Hu C-w | 9 | 6

Second round
(England) Hodgson (Denmark) Hasle | 21 | 21
(Poland) Poszelężny (Poland) Okipniak | 7 | 12
(India) Sarikonda (India) Prabinu | 19 | 10
5/8 | (France) B. Leverdez (France) J. Leverdez^{‡} | 21 | 21
(Germany) L. Paulsen (Germany) C. Paulsen | 21 | 21
(England) Parker (England) Woods | 14 | 9
(Japan) Koike (Japan) Minagawa | 21 | 17 | 17
3/4 | (Canada) Ng (United States) Pai | 15 | 21 | 21

Third round
(England) Hodgson (Denmark) Hasle | 12 | 14
5/8 | (France) B. Leverdez (France) J. Leverdez^{‡} | 21 | 21
(Germany) L. Paulsen (Germany) C. Paulsen | 10 | 12
3/4 | (Canada) Ng (United States) Pai | 21 | 21

Quarter-finals
5/8 | (France) B. Leverdez (France) J. Leverdez^{‡} | 13 | 21 | 21
3/4 | (Canada) Ng (United States) Pai | 21 | 15 | 19

==== Section 4 ====
First round
(Hong Kong) Yu^{?} (Hong Kong) Tang | 18 | 21 | 21
(Chinese Taipei) Wang C-k^{‡} (Chinese Taipei) Chiang C-h | 21 | 15 | 17
(France) Lenik (France) Boyer | 21 | 21
(Japan) Homma^{‡} (Japan) Jigami | 14 | 17
(Slovakia) Vícen (Slovakia) Ferencová | 18 | 21 | 19
(United Arab Emirates) John (United Arab Emirates) Jayashri | 21 | 18 | 21
(Australia) Bhatia (Australia) Suzuki^{‡} | 21 | 16 | 21
(Canada) Kim (Canada) Diep^{‡} | 11 | 21 | 11
(Sri Lanka) Yatapana^{‡} (Sri Lanka) Gangani | 21 | 16 | 22
(Denmark) Christensen (Sweden) Saarela | 17 | 21 | 20
(Spain) Rangil^{‡} (Spain) Fernández | 19 | 17
(Germany) Shafiq (Germany) Kirn | 21 | 21

Second round
(Hong Kong) Yu^{?} (Hong Kong) Tang | 21 | 21
(France) Lenik (France) Boyer | 11 | 15
(United Arab Emirates) John (United Arab Emirates) Jayashri | 15 | 5
5/8 | (Thailand) Suntiparaphop (Thailand) Jarajapreedee | 21 | 21
(Australia) Bhatia (Australia) Suzuki^{‡} | 21 | 21
(Sri Lanka) Yatapana^{‡} (Sri Lanka) Gangani | 13 | 19
(Germany) Shafiq (Germany) Kirn | 3 | 16
2 | (Indonesia) Setiawan^{‡} (Indonesia) Susanto | 21 | 21

Third round
(Hong Kong) Yu^{?} (Hong Kong) Tang | 23 | 16 | 10
5/8 | (Thailand) Suntiparaphop (Thailand) Jarajapreedee | 21 | 21 | 21
(Australia) Bhatia (Australia) Suzuki^{‡} | 9 | 12
2 | (Indonesia) Setiawan^{‡} (Indonesia) Susanto | 21 | 21

Quarter-finals
5/8 | (Thailand) Suntiparaphop (Thailand) Jarajapreedee | 8 | 12
2 | (Indonesia) Setiawan^{‡} (Indonesia) Susanto | 21 | 21
