= Xing Aiying =

Singaporean badminton player

Xing Aiying 邢爱英
Personal information
- Born: 2 August 1989 (age 37) Jiangsu, China
- Height: 1.68 m (5 ft 6 in)
- Weight: 55 kg (121 lb)

Sport
- Country: Singapore
- Sport: Badminton
- Handedness: Right

Women's singles
- Highest ranking: 31 (8 October 2009)
- BWF profile
Medal record
Women's badminton
Representing Singapore
World Senior Championships
Gold medal – first place	2025 Pattaya	Women's singles 35+
Bronze medal – third place	2025 Pattaya	Mixed doubles 35+
Asian Games
Bronze medal – third place	2006 Doha	Women's team
Southeast Asian Games
Silver medal – second place	2005 Manila	Women's team
Silver medal – second place	2007 Nakhon Ratchasima	Women's team
Bronze medal – third place	2009 Vientiane	Women's team
Bronze medal – third place	2011 Jakarta	Women's team
World Junior Championships
Bronze medal – third place	2007 Waitakere City	Mixed team

Xing Aiying (simplified Chinese: 邢爱英; traditional Chinese: 邢愛英; pinyin: Xìng Àiyīng; born 2 August 1989) is a Chinese-born Singaporean former badminton player who competed at the 2008 Summer Olympics.

== Early life ==
Xing was born in Jiangsu, China, and she is a former Nanjing city age-group champion in 1998. She came to Singapore in 2003 and became the Chinese youngest player to join the Singapore Badminton Association (SBA).

== Career ==
Xing started her debut in international tournament at the 2003 Thailand King's Cup. In 2004, she was the women's doubles runner-up at the Croatian International tournament, and won her first international title at the World Badminton Grand Prix event U.S. Open in the singles event at the age of 15.

In 2005, she reached the final round in the women's singles event at the Bitburger Open and Cheers Asian Satellite tournaments. In Ballarat International, she won the women's doubles event and the runner-up in singles event. In 2006, she competed in the women's team event at the Uber Cup and Doha Asian Games. The team reached the quarter-final at the Uber Cup, and won the bronze medal at the Asian Games. She also competed at the Melbourne Commonwealth Games in the mixed team and singles event, and lost to Malaysian players Wong Mew Choo in the quarter-final. At the 2006 New Zealand Open, she was seeded fourth at that tournament, and unexpected lost in the final round to Huang Chia-chi of Australia in the rubber game. In 2007, she won her first national title in the women's singles event, and repeat her success in 2013. She also won the mixed team bronze at the World Junior Championships and women's team silver at the SEA Games. In 2008, she was the runner-up at the Vietnam Open and semi-finalist in Thailand Open. Xing qualified for the women's singles at the 2008 Summer Olympics in Beijing, after she was ranked thirty-sixth in the world, and awarded an entry as one of the top 38 seeded players by the Badminton World Federation. She lost the first preliminary round match to Belarus' Olga Konon, with a score of 19–21 and 12–21.

In 2009, she was the quarter-finalist at the Malaysia Grand Prix Gold, and also won the women's team bronze at the SEA Games. In 2010, she helps the Singapore team to reach the semi-final round in the mixed team event at the Delhi Commonwealth Games. At the bronze medal match against England, she won the match to Elizabeth Cann, but the team went down 1-3 and missed out on the bronze. In 2011 and 2012, she won the women's singles title at the Singapore International Series tournament. She also won the bronze medal at the 2011 SEA Games in the women's team event. In 2012, she also the runner-up in the national championships, and was the semi-finalist at the Malaysia Grand Prix Gold and Singapore Open Superseries tournament. In 2013, Xing reached the quarter-final round at the U.S. Open, and at the same year, she resigned from the SBA. Together with the former Singaporean national player Mok Jing Qiong, the duo crowned champion at the 2014 Singapore National Games.

== Achievements ==
=== World Senior Championships ===
Women's singles

Year	Age	Venue	Opponent	Score	Result	Ref
2025	35+	Eastern National Sports Training Centre, Pattaya, Thailand	(Japan) Konomi Nomura	21–18, 21–13	Gold	

Mixed doubles

Year	Age	Venue	Partner	Opponent	Score	Result	Ref
2025	35+	Eastern National Sports Training Centre, Pattaya, Thailand	(Singapore) Danny Bawa Chrisnanta	(Thailand) Nawut Thanateeratam (Indonesia) Vacharaporn Munkit	21–17, 11–21, 10–21	Bronze	

=== BWF Grand Prix ===
The BWF Grand Prix had two levels, the Grand Prix and Grand Prix Gold. It was a series of badminton tournaments sanctioned by the Badminton World Federation (BWF) and played between 2007 and 2017. The World Badminton Grand Prix was sanctioned by the International Badminton Federation from 1983 to 2006.

Women's singles
Year	Tournament	Opponent	Score	Result
2004	U.S. Open	(United States) Lili Zhou	9–11, 11–6, 11–2	(gold) Winner
2005	Bitburger Open	(Germany) Xu Huaiwen	3–11, 2–11	(silver) Runner-up
2006	New Zealand Open	(Australia) Huang Chia-chi	18–21, 24–22, 15–21	(silver) Runner-up
2008	Vietnam Open	(Singapore) Zhang Beiwen	21–11, 19–21, 20–22	(silver) Runner-up

=== BWF International Challenge/Series ===
Women's singles
Year	Tournament	Opponent	Score	Result
2005	Cheers Asian Satellite	(Singapore) Li Li	7–11, 11–9, 5–11	(silver) Runner-up
2011	Singapore International	(Singapore) Gu Juan	21–10, 21–12	(gold) Winner
2012	Singapore International	(Singapore) Fu Mingtian	21–10, 21–8	(gold) Winner

Women's doubles
Year	Tournament	Partner	Opponent	Score	Result
2004	Croatian International	(Singapore) Shinta Mulia Sari	(Singapore) Jiang Yanmei (Singapore) Li Yujia	4–15, 1–15	(silver) Runner-up

BWF International Challenge tournament
BWF International Series tournament
