= Laurent Constantin =

French badminton player (born 1988)

Personal information
- Born: 10 June 1988 (age 38)
- Height: 1.73 m (5 ft 8 in)
- Weight: 65 kg (143 lb)

Sport
- Country: France
- Sport: Badminton

Men's & mixed doubles
- Highest ranking: 37 (MD 3 February 2011); 73 (XD 26 February 2015)
- BWF profile
Medal record
Men's badminton
Representing France
World Senior Championships
Silver medal – second place	2025 Pattaya	Men's doubles 35+

Laurent Constantin (born 10 June 1988) is a French badminton player in men's and mixed doubles event. In 2010, he won Finnish Open tournament. In 2012, he won Estonian International, Banuinvest International, and Miami International tournaments. In 2013, he won Estonian International, and became the runner-up at Tahiti International and Puerto Rico International. in 2014, he became the champion in French National Badminton Championships, and won the Brazil and Guatemala International tournament, then in 2015, he won Estonian International tournament.

== Achievements ==
=== World Senior Championships ===
Men's doubles
Year	Age	Venue	Partner	Opponent	Score	Result	Ref.
2025	35+	Eastern National Sports Training Centre; Pattaya, Thailand	(France) Brice Leverdez	(Singapore) Danny Bawa Chrisnanta (Indonesia) Fernando Kurniawan	14–21, 16–21	Silver	

=== BWF International Challenge/Series ===
Men's doubles
Year	Tournament	Partner	Opponent	Score	Result
2009	Portugal International	(France) Sébastien Vincent	(Spain) Ruben Gordown Khosadalina (Spain) Stenny Kusuma	12–21, 11–21	(silver) Runner-up
2009	Cyprus International	(France) Sébastien Vincent	(Denmark) Christopher Bruun Jensen (Denmark) Morten Kronborg	16–21, 21–8, 17–21	(silver) Runner-up
2010	Finnish International	(France) Sébastien Vincent	(Russia) Andrei Ivanov (Russia) Andrey Ashmarin	21–12, 21–18	(gold) Winner
2012	Estonian International	(France) Sébastien Vincent	(Netherlands) Jorrit de Ruiter (Netherlands) Dave Khodabux	21–17, 19–21, 21–15	(gold) Winner
2012	Banuinvest International	(France) Sébastien Vincent	(Indonesia) Arya Maulana Aldiartama (Indonesia) Edi Subaktiar	21–18, 20–22, 21–17	(gold) Winner
2012	Miami International	(France) Florent Riancho	(Dominican Republic) William Cabrera (Dominican Republic) Nelson Javier	21–7, 21–16	(gold) Winner
2013	Estonian International	(France) Matthieu Lo Ying Ping	(Finland) Iikka Heino (Finland) Mika Köngäs	21–11, 22–20	(gold) Winner
2013	Tahiti International	(France) Matthieu Lo Ying Ping	(Netherlands) Ruud Bosch (Netherlands) Koen Ridder	13–21, 10–21	(silver) Runner-up
2013	Puerto Rico International	(France) Matthieu Lo Ying Ping	(France) Lucas Corvée (France) Brice Leverdez	14–21, 12–21	(silver) Runner-up
2014	Estonian International	(France) Matthieu Lo Ying Ping	(Russia) Nikita Khakimov (Russia) Vasily Kuznetsov	21–14, 13–21, 19–21	(silver) Runner-up
2014	Guatemala International	(France) Matthieu Lo Ying Ping	(Guatemala) Rodolfo Ramírez (Guatemala) Jonathan Solís	11–9, 11–7, 9–11, 9–11, 11–10	(gold) Winner
2014	Brazil International	(France) Matthieu Lo Ying Ping	(France) Bastian Kersaudy (France) Gaëtan Mittelheisser	9–11, 11–9, 7–11, 5–11	(silver) Runner-up
2015	Estonian International	(France) Matthieu Lo Ying Ping	(Finland) Mika Köngäs (Finland) Jesper von Hertzen	21–14, 21–19	(gold) Winner

Mixed doubles
Year	Tournament	Partner	Opponent	Score	Result
2012	Miami International	(France) Andréa Vanderstukken	(Suriname) Mitchel Wongsodikromo (Suriname) Crystal Leefmans	23–21, 21–14	(gold) Winner
2013	Tahiti International	(France) Teshana Vignes Waran	(Netherlands) Ruud Bosch (Thailand) Salakjit Ponsana	18–21, 15–21	(silver) Runner-up
2013	Puerto Rico International	(France) Laura Choinet	(Poland) Robert Mateusiak (Poland) Agnieszka Wojtkowska	13–21, 8–21	(silver) Runner-up
2014	Brazil International	(France) Laura Choinet	(France) Gaëtan Mittelheisser (France) Audrey Fontaine	11–10, 5–11, 11–10, 11–7	(gold) Winner

BWF International Challenge tournament
BWF International Series tournament
BWF Future Series tournament
