= Fernando Kurniawan =

Indonesian badminton player (born 1988)

Personal information
- Nickname: Edo
- Born: 5 June 1988 (age 38) Palembang, South Sumatra
- Height: 1.65 m (5 ft 5 in)
- Weight: 54 kg (119 lb)

Sport
- Country: Indonesia; Hong Kong (2012-2015)
- Sport: Badminton
- Handedness: Right

Men's & mixed doubles
- Highest ranking: 34 (MD) 22 Oct 2010; 53 (XD) 27 Nov 2014
- BWF profile
Medal record
Men's badminton
Representing Indonesia
World Senior Championships
Gold medal – first place	2025 Pattaya	Men's doubles 35+
Asian Junior Championships
Bronze medal – third place	2006 Kuala Lumpur	Mixed team

Fernando Kurniawan (born 5 June 1988) is an Indonesian male badminton player.

== Personal life ==
His brother Fran Kurniawan also a professional badminton player. His hobbies are playing basketball, and automotive modified.

== Career ==
He joined PB Djarum badminton club in 2003, and in 2006 he joined the Indonesia national badminton team. In 2008, he became the champion of the Smiling Fish International Series tournament in men's doubles event partnered with Lingga Lie. They also won Singapore Asian Satellite tournament after beat Chayut Triyachart and Danny Bawa Chrisnanta of Singapore with the score 21-12, 17-21, 21-19. He became the runner-up of the New Zealand Open Grand Prix tournament in men's doubles event after defeated by Chen Hung-ling and Lin Yu-lang of Chinese Taipei with the score 22-20, 21-10. He also became the semifinalist at the Macau Open Grand Prix Gold tournament in men's doubles event after defeated by Koo Kien Keat and Tan Boon Heong of Malaysia. He represented North Maluku at the National Sports Week tournament in men's doubles event partnered with Mohammad Ahsan. They won a silver medal after defeated by Tony Gunawan and Bambang Supriyanto of East Java in the final round with the score 21-19, 12-21, 22-20.

In 2009, he became the semifinalist at the Vietnam International Challenge and New Zealand Open Grand Prix tournaments in men's doubles event. At New Zealand, he and Lie lost to Hirokatsu Hashimoto and Noriyasu Hirata of Japan with the score 21-16, 17-21, 21-17. In 2010, he became the champion at the Vietnam International tournament in men's doubles event partnered with Wifqi Windarto after beat Patiphat Chalardchalaem and Nipitphon Puangpuapech with the score 21-19, 14-21, 21-13 in 45 minutes. He also became the runner-up of the White Nights tournament in Russia with Windarto. They lost the final match to their teammate Rian Sukmawan and Rendra Wijaya in rubber game 14-21, 21-13, 21-12.

In 2012, he started to representing Hong Kong in international tournament event. In 2014, he became the runner-up of the Vietnam International tournament in mixed doubles event partnered with Poon Lok Yan after defeated by Alfian Eko Prasetya and Annisa Saufika of Indonesia with the score 21-14, 21-17. He also became the semifinalist of the Osaka International tournament in mixed doubles event.

In 2015, he moved back to his home country Indonesia, and started to playing in national event. He won some titles at Djarum National Circuit partnered with Fran Kurniawan, Tedi Supriadi, and Marsheilla Gischa Islami.

== Achievements ==
=== World Senior Championships ===
Men's doubles
Year	Age	Venue	Partner	Opponent	Score	Result	Ref.
2025	35+	Eastern National Sports Training Centre; Pattaya, Thailand	(Singapore) Danny Bawa Chrisnanta	(France) Laurent Constantin (France) Brice Leverdez	21–14, 21–16	Gold	

=== BWF Grand Prix ===
The BWF Grand Prix has two level such as Grand Prix and Grand Prix Gold. It is a series of badminton tournaments, sanctioned by Badminton World Federation (BWF) since 2007.

Men's doubles
Year	Tournament	Partner	Opponent	Score	Result
2008	New Zealand Open	(Indonesia) Lingga Lie	(Chinese Taipei) Chen Hung-ling (Chinese Taipei) Lin Yu-lang	20–22, 10–21	(silver) Runner-up

BWF Grand Prix Gold tournament
BWF Grand Prix tournament

=== BWF International Challenge/Series ===
Men's doubles
Year	Tournament	Partner	Opponent	Score	Result
2011	White Nights	(Indonesia) Wifqi Windarto	(Indonesia) Rendra Wijaya (Indonesia) Rian Sukmawan	21–14, 13–21, 12–21	(silver) Runner-up
2011	Vietnam International	(Indonesia) Wifqi Windarto	(Thailand) Patiphat Chalardchalaem (Thailand) Nipitphon Puangpuapech	21–19, 14–21, 21–13	(gold) Winner
2008	Singapore Asian Satellite	(Indonesia) Lingga Lie	(Singapore) Chayut Triyachart (Singapore) Danny Bawa Chrisnanta	21–12, 17–21, 21–19	(gold) Winner
2008	Smiling Fish International	(Indonesia) Lingga Lie	(Indonesia) Wifqi Windarto (Indonesia) Afiat Yuris Wirawan	21–16, 21–15	(gold) Winner

Mixed doubles
Year	Tournament	Partner	Opponent	Score	Result
2014	Vietnam International	(Hong Kong) Poon Lok Yan	(Indonesia) Alfian Eko Prasetya (Indonesia) Annisa Saufika	14–21, 17–21	(silver) Runner-up

BWF International Challenge tournament
BWF International Series tournament

=== BWF Junior International (2 titles) ===
Boys' doubles
Year	Tournament	Partner	Opponent	Score	Result	Ref.
2007	Dutch Junior	(Indonesia) Subakti	(Indonesia) Afiat Yuris Wirawan (Indonesia) Wifqi Windarto	21–16, 21–18	(gold) Winner	
2007	German Junior	(Indonesia) Subakti	(South Korea) Chung Eui-seok (South Korea) Kim Young-sun	21–14, 21–15	(gold) Winner	

BWF Junior International Grand Prix tournament
BWF Junior International Challenge tournament
BWF Junior International Series tournament
BWF Junior Future Series tournament
