= Fran Kurniawan =

Indonesian badminton player (born 1985)

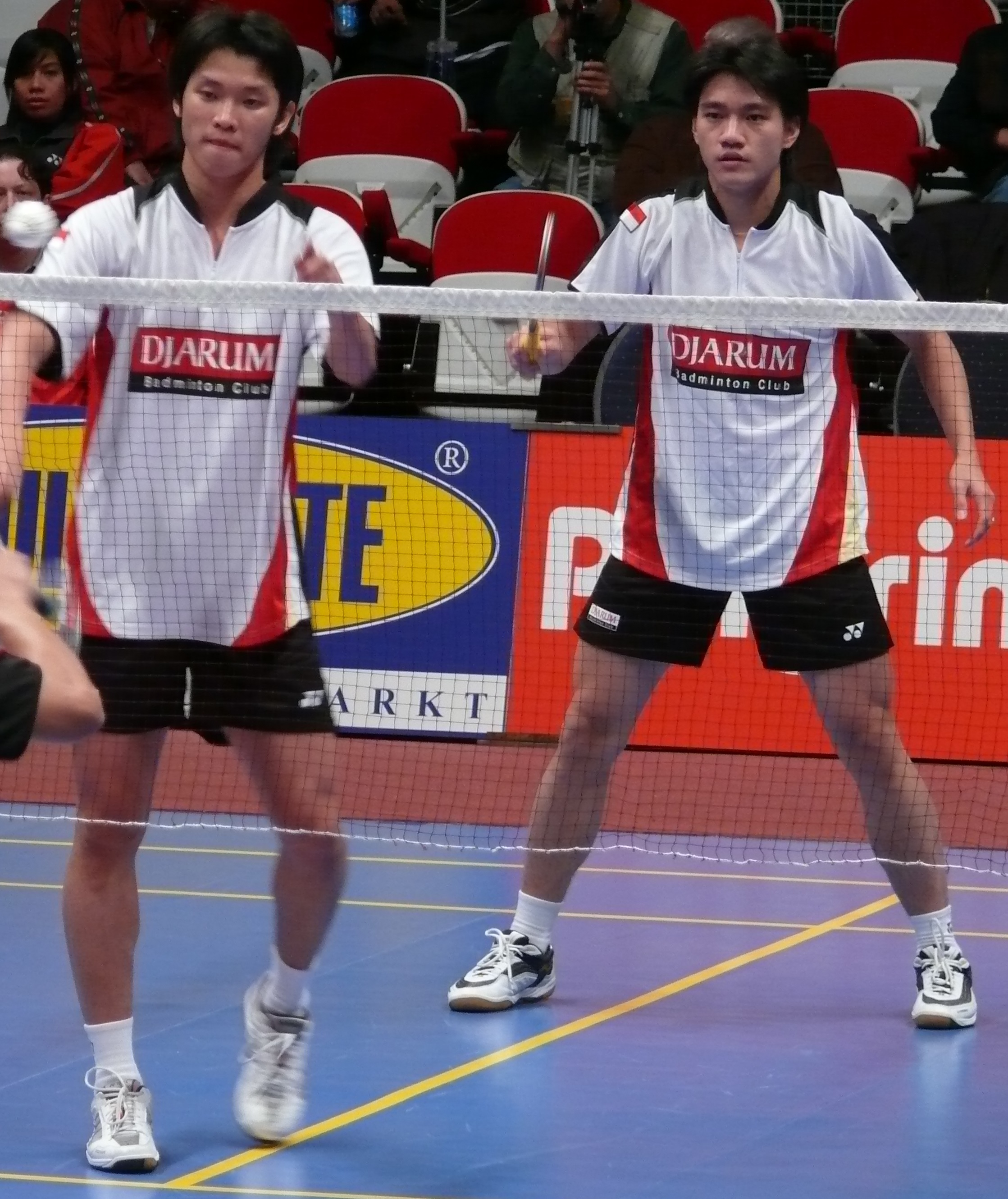
- Kurniawan (left) with Rendra Wijaya

Personal information
- Born: Fran Kurniawan Teng; 1 April 1985 (age 41) Palembang, South Sumatra, Indonesia
- Height: 1.80 m (5 ft 11 in)
- Weight: 71 kg (157 lb)

Sport
- Country: Indonesia
- Sport: Badminton
- Handedness: Right

Men's & mixed doubles
- Highest ranking: 30 (MD 17 July 2014); 8 (XD 15 September 2011)
- BWF profile
Medal record
Men's badminton
Representing Indonesia
World Senior Championships
Gold medal – first place	2023 Jeonju	Men's doubles 35+
Sudirman Cup
Bronze medal – third place	2011 Qingdao	Mixed team
Asian Games
Bronze medal – third place	2010 Guangzhou	Men's team
Asian Championships
Bronze medal – third place	2013 Taipei	Mixed doubles

Fran Kurniawan Teng (born 1 April 1985) is an Indonesian badminton player from PB Djarum who specializes in doubles. In 2011, he became the determinant for the Indonesian team to qualified from the group stage at the 2011 Sudirman Cup. In the end, Indonesia won the bronze medal at that competition.

== Personal life ==
Kurniawan has a younger brother who also become badminton player named Fernando Kurniawan, but for now Fernando representing Hong Kong in international tournament. Kurniawan is married to Arlin Trisuci in Pantai Indah Kapuk on 16 February 2013. He is now managing his mother's culinary business.

== Achievements ==
=== World Senior Championships ===
Men's doubles

Year	Age	Venue	Partner	Opponent	Score	Result	Ref
2023	35+	Hwasan Indoor Stadium, Jeonju, South Korea	(Indonesia) Alvent Yulianto	(Japan) Yuki Homma (Japan) Masakazu Mouri	21–17, 21–12	Gold	

=== Asian Championships ===
Mixed doubles
Year	Venue	Partner	Opponent	Score	Result
2013	Taipei Arena, Taipei, Chinese Taipei	(Indonesia) Shendy Puspa Irawati	(South Korea) Ko Sung-hyun (South Korea) Kim Ha-na	21–23, 15–21	Bronze

=== BWF Superseries (1 runner-up) ===
The BWF Superseries, which was launched on 14 December 2006 and implemented in 2007, is a series of elite badminton tournaments, sanctioned by the Badminton World Federation (BWF). BWF Superseries levels are Superseries and Superseries Premier. A season of Superseries consists of twelve tournaments around the world that have been introduced since 2011. Successful players are invited to the Superseries Finals, which are held at the end of each year.

Mixed doubles
Year	Tournament	Partner	Opponent	Score	Result
2011	India Open	(Indonesia) Pia Zebadiah Bernadet	(Indonesia) Tontowi Ahmad (Indonesia) Liliyana Natsir	18–21, 21–23	(silver) Runner-up

BWF Super Series Finals tournament
BWF Super Series Premier tournament
BWF Super Series tournament

=== BWF Grand Prix (4 titles, 6 runners-up) ===
The BWF Grand Prix had two levels, the BWF Grand Prix and Grand Prix Gold. It was a series of badminton tournaments sanctioned by the Badminton World Federation (BWF) which was held from 2007 to 2017.

Men's doubles
Year	Tournament	Partner	Opponent	Score	Result
2007	Dutch Open	(Indonesia) Rendra Wijaya	(Indonesia) Yonathan Suryatama Dasuki (Indonesia) Rian Sukmawan	13–21, 12–21	(silver) Runner-up
2008	Bulgarian Open	(Indonesia) Rendra Wijaya	(Denmark) Mathias Boe (Denmark) Carsten Mogensen	23–25, 16–21	(silver) Runner-up
2008	Dutch Open	(Indonesia) Rendra Wijaya	(India) Rupesh Kumar (India) Sanave Thomas	21–18, 21–18	(gold) Winner
2008	Vietnam Open	(Indonesia) Rendra Wijaya	(Malaysia) Choong Tan Fook (Malaysia) Lee Wan Wah	14–21, 10–21	(silver) Runner-up
2013	Vietnam Open	(Indonesia) Bona Septano	(Chinese Taipei) Lin Chia-yu (Chinese Taipei) Wu Hsiao-lin	18–21, 21–18, 21–18	(gold) Winner
2014	Dutch Open	(Indonesia) Agripina Prima Rahmanto Putra	(France) Baptiste Carême (France) Ronan Labar	11–5, 10–11, 10–11, 7–11	(silver) Runner-up

Mixed doubles
Year	Tournament	Partner	Opponent	Score	Result
2008	Bulgarian Open	(Indonesia) Shendy Puspa Irawati	(India) Valiyaveetil Diju (India) Jwala Gutta	21–15, 18–21, 19–21	(silver) Runner-up
2008	Dutch Open	(Indonesia) Shendy Puspa Irawati	(Denmark) Joachim Fischer Nielsen (Denmark) Christinna Pedersen	17–21, 9–21	(silver) Runner-up
2009	New Zealand Open	(Indonesia) Pia Zebadiah Bernadet	(Hong Kong) Yohan Hadikusumo Wiratama (Hong Kong) Chau Hoi Wah	21–13, 21–19	(gold) Winner
2012	India Grand Prix Gold	(Indonesia) Shendy Puspa Irawati	(Thailand) Nipitphon Puangpuapech (Thailand) Savitree Amitrapai	21–12, 24–22	(gold) Winner

BWF Grand Prix Gold tournament
BWF Grand Prix tournament

=== BWF International Challenge/Series (11 titles, 7 runners-up) ===
Men's doubles
Year	Tournament	Partner	Opponent	Score	Result
2006	Cheers Asian Satellite	(Indonesia) Rendra Wijaya	(Indonesia) Yonathan Suryatama Dasuki (Indonesia) Yoga Ukikasah	19–21, 21–18, 20–22	(silver) Runner-up
2007	Indonesia International	(Indonesia) Ade Lukas	(Indonesia) Yonathan Suryatama Dasuki (Indonesia) Rian Sukmawan	18–21, 17–21	(silver) Runner-up
2008	Austrian International	(Indonesia) Rendra Wijaya	(Belgium) Wouter Claes (Belgium) Frédéric Mawet	21–14, 21–11	(gold) Winner
2008	Finnish International	(Indonesia) Rendra Wijaya	(Denmark) Jacob Chemnitz (Denmark) Mikkel Delbo Larsen	21–19, 11–21, 21–14	(gold) Winner
2008	Spanish International	(Indonesia) Rendra Wijaya	(Poland) Adam Cwalina (Poland) Wojciech Szkudlarczyk	21–11, 21–13	(gold) Winner
2008	Indonesia International	(Indonesia) Rendra Wijaya	(Indonesia) Wifqi Windarto (Indonesia) Afiat Yuris Wirawan	21–18, 21–13	(gold) Winner
2014	Indonesia International	(Indonesia) Agripina Prima Rahmanto Putra	(Indonesia) Fajar Alfian (Indonesia) Muhammad Rian Ardianto	11–9, 9–11, 9–11, 8–11	(silver) Runner-up
2014	Bahrain International Challenge	(Indonesia) Agripina Prima Rahmanto Putra	(Indonesia) Yohanes Rendy Sugiarto (Indonesia) Afiat Yuris Wirawan	21–23, 15–21	(silver) Runner-up

Mixed doubles
Year	Tournament	Partner	Opponent	Score	Result
2008	Indonesia International	(Indonesia) Shendy Puspa Irawati	(Singapore) Chayut Triyachart (Singapore) Yao Lei	21–19, 21–13	(gold) Winner
2008	Le Volant d'Or de Toulouse	(Indonesia) Shendy Puspa Irawati	(Indonesia) Rendra Wijaya (Indonesia) Meiliana Jauhari	21–18, 18–21, 21–14	(gold) Winner
2008	Finnish International	(Indonesia) Shendy Puspa Irawati	(Denmark) Mads Pieler Kolding (Denmark) Line Damkjær Kruse	21–12, 21–18	(gold) Winner
2008	Polish International	(Indonesia) Shendy Puspa Irawati	(Poland) Robert Mateusiak (Poland) Nadieżda Zięba	14–21, 13–21	(silver) Runner-up
2009	Vietnam International	(Indonesia) Pia Zebadiah Bernadet	(Indonesia) Tontowi Ahmad (Indonesia) Richi Puspita Dili	14–21, 8–21	(silver) Runner-up
2011	Tata Open India International	(Indonesia) Shendy Puspa Irawati	(Indonesia) Riky Widianto (Indonesia) Richi Puspita Dili	21–15, 21–15	(gold) Winner
2014	Bulgarian International	(Indonesia) Komala Dewi	(Germany) Max Schwenger (Germany) Carla Nelte	18–21, 21–19, 21–13	(gold) Winner
2014	Bahrain International Challenge	(Indonesia) Komala Dewi	(Russia) Vitalij Durkin (Russia) Nina Vislova	8–21, 10–21	(silver) Runner-up
2015	Vietnam International	(Indonesia) Komala Dewi	(Indonesia) Hafiz Faizal (Indonesia) Masita Mahmudin	21–14, 21–11	(gold) Winner
2015	Indonesia International	(Indonesia) Komala Dewi	(South Korea) Chung Eui-seok (South Korea) Kong Hee-yong	21–12, 16–21, 21–13	(gold) Winner

BWF International Challenge tournament
BWF International Series tournament

== Performance timeline ==
=== National team ===
- Senior level

Team events	2010	2011
Asian Games	Bronze	—N/a
Sudirman Cup	—N/a	Bronze

=== Individual competitions ===
- Senior level

Event	2013
Asian Championships	Bronze

Event	2010	2011	2013
World Championships	R2 (XD)	R2 (XD)	R2 (XD)

Tournament	2007	2008	2009	2010	2011	2012	2013	2014	Best
BWF Superseries
India Open	—N/a	GPG			F (XD)	R2 (XD)	QF (XD)	R1 (MD)	F (2011)

Tournament	2007	2008	2009	2010	2011	2012	2013	2014	2015	Best
BWF Grand Prix and Grand Prix Gold
Bulgarian Open	—N/a	F (MD); F (XD)	—N/a			IS				F (2008 (WD), 2008 (XD))
Syed Modi International	—N/a		A		SF (XD)	W (XD)	—N/a	QF (MD)	A	W (2012)
New Zealand Open	A		W (XD)	—N/a	IC	—N/a	A		QF (XD)	W (2009)
Vietnam Open	QF (MD); QF (XD)	F (MD)	A			SF (XD)	W (MD)	R2 (MD); SF (XD)	R1 (XD)	W (2013)
Dutch Open	F (MD)	W (MD); F (XD)	A					F (MD); R2 (XD)	A	W (2008)
