= Suppanyu Avihingsanon =

Thai badminton player (born 1989)

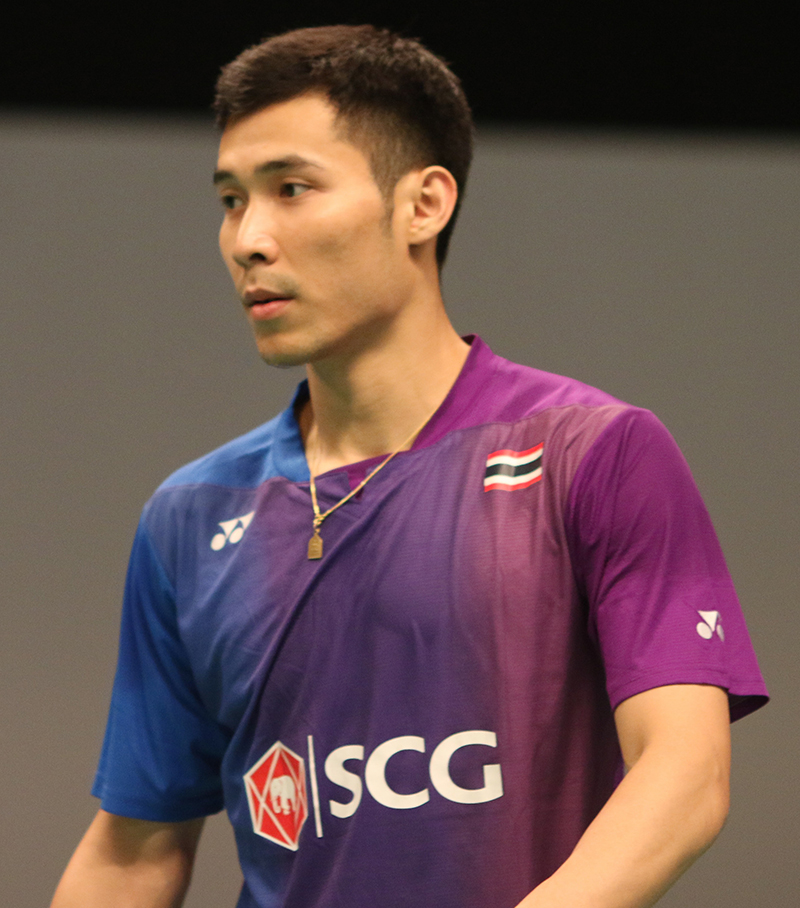

Personal information
- Born: 24 October 1989 (age 37) Bangkok, Thailand
- Height: 1.81 m (5 ft 11 in)
- Weight: 78 kg (172 lb)

Sport
- Country: Thailand
- Sport: Badminton
- Handedness: Right

Men's singles
- Highest ranking: 19 (8 January 2019)
- BWF profile
Medal record
Men's badminton
Representing Thailand
World Senior Championships
Gold medal – first place	2025 Pattaya	Men's singles 35+
Sudirman Cup
Bronze medal – third place	2017 Gold Coast	Mixed team
Asian Games
Bronze medal – third place	2010 Guangzhou	Men's team
Asia Mixed Team Championships
Bronze medal – third place	2017 Ho Chi Minh	Mixed team
SEA Games
Silver medal – second place	2015 Singapore	Men's team
Bronze medal – third place	2011 Jakarta–Palembang	Men's team
Bronze medal – third place	2017 Kuala Lumpur	Men's team
Bronze medal – third place	2019 Philippines	Men's team
Summer Universiade
Gold medal – first place	2011 Shenzhen	Men's singles
Bronze medal – third place	2011 Shenzhen	Mixed team
Bronze medal – third place	2015 Gwangju	Mixed team

Suppanyu Avihingsanon (Thai: สัพพัญญู อวิหิงสานนท์; RTGS: Sapphanyu Awihingsanon; born 24 October 1989) is a Thai badminton player. He was the men's singles gold medalist at the 2011 Summer Universiade.

== Achievements ==
=== BWF World Senior Championships ===
Men's singles
Year	Age	Venue	Opponent	Score	Result	Ref.
2025	35+	Eastern National Sports Training Centre; Pattaya, Thailand	(Sri Lanka) Niluka Karunaratne	21–6, 9–21, 21–18	Gold	

=== Summer Universiade ===
Men's singles
Year	Venue	Opponent	Score	Result
2011	Gymnasium of SZIIT; Shenzhen, China	(China) Wen Kai	21–18, 21–16	Gold

=== BWF World Tour (1 runner-up) ===
The BWF World Tour, which was announced on 19 March 2017 and implemented in 2018, is a series of elite badminton tournaments sanctioned by the Badminton World Federation (BWF). The BWF World Tour is divided into levels of World Tour Finals, Super 1000, Super 750, Super 500, Super 300 (part of the HSBC World Tour), and the BWF Tour Super 100.

Men's singles
Year	Tournament	Level	Opponent	Score	Result
2018	Spain Masters	Super 300	(Denmark) Rasmus Gemke	21–15, 6–21, 14–21	(silver) Runner-up

=== BWF Grand Prix (2 runners-up) ===
The BWF Grand Prix had two levels, the Grand Prix and Grand Prix Gold. It was a series of badminton tournaments sanctioned by the Badminton World Federation (BWF) and played between 2007 and 2017.

Men's singles
Year	Tournament	Opponent	Score	Result
2010	India Grand Prix	(Indonesia) Dionysius Hayom Rumbaka	21–14, 15–21, 12–21	(silver) Runner-up
2017	Vietnam Open	(Thailand) Khosit Phetpradab	15–21, 19–21	(silver) Runner-up

BWF Grand Prix Gold tournament
BWF Grand Prix tournament

=== BWF International Challenge/Series (3 runners-up) ===
Men's Singles
Year	Tournament	Opponent	Score	Result
2015	Thailand International	(South Korea) Lee Hyun-il	13–21, 10–21	(silver) Runner-up
2016	Smiling Fish International	(Indonesia) Krishna Adi Nugraha	18–21, 9–21	(silver) Runner-up
2016	USM Indonesia International	(Indonesia) Shesar Hiren Rhustavito	19–21, 21–11, 17–21	(silver) Runner-up

BWF International Challenge tournament
BWF International Series tournament
BWF Future Series tournament
