= 2023 BWF World Senior Championships – 35+ =

Tournament details
- Dates: 11 September 2023 – 17 September 2023
- Edition: 11
- Level: International
- Competitors: 188 from 27 nations
- Venue: Hwasan Indoor Stadium; Jeonju Indoor Badminton Hall
- Location: Jeonju, South Korea

Champions
- Men's singles: (Japan) Makoto Aoyama
- Women's singles: (Japan) Mana Yatabe
- Men's doubles: (Indonesia) Alvent Yulianto (Indonesia) Fran Kurniawan
- Women's doubles: (Thailand) Molthila Kijanon (Thailand) Vacharaporn Munkit
- Mixed doubles: (Thailand) Nawut Thanathiratham (Thailand) Vacharaporn Munkit

These are the results of 2023 BWF World Senior Championships' 35+ events.

== Competition schedule ==
Match was played as scheduled below.

#R	Preliminary rounds	QF	Quarter-finals	SF	Semi-finals	F	Finals

H	Hwasan Indoor Stadium	J	Jeonju Indoor Badminton Hall

Date	11 Sep		12 Sep		13 Sep		14 Sep		15 Sep	16 Sep	17 Sep
Venue	H	J	H	J	H	J	H	J	H	H	H
Men's singles	1R			2R	3R			QF		SF	F
Women's singles	1R				2R			QF		SF	F
Men's doubles	1R			2R				3R	QF	SF	F
Women's doubles				1R				2R	QF	SF	F
Mixed doubles	1R				2R			3R	QF	SF	F

== Medal summary ==
=== Medal standings ===
* Host nation (South Korea)

2023 BWF World Senior Championships medal table
Rank	Nation	Gold	Silver	Bronze	Total
1	Japan	2	2	3	7
2	Thailand	2	1	4	7
3	Indonesia	1	0	0	1
4	New Zealand	0	1	0	1
5	Canada	0	0.5	1	1.5
6	United States	0	0.5	0	0.5
7	India	0	0	1	1
7	Sri Lanka	0	0	1	1
Totals (8 entries)		5	5	10	20

=== Medalists ===
Event	Gold	Silver	Bronze
Men's singles	(Japan) Makoto Aoyama	(New Zealand) Joe Wu	(Thailand) Tawan Huansuriya
Men's singles	(Japan) Makoto Aoyama	(New Zealand) Joe Wu	(Canada) Derrick Ng
Women's singles	(Japan) Mana Yatabe	(Thailand) Benjaporn Thienrajkij	(Japan) Azusa Soga
Women's singles	(Japan) Mana Yatabe	(Thailand) Benjaporn Thienrajkij	(Sri Lanka) Nadeesha Gayanthi
Men's doubles	(Indonesia) Alvent Yulianto (Indonesia) Fran Kurniawan	(Japan) Yuki Homma (Japan) Masakazu Mouri	(Thailand) Santiphap Kaweenanthawong (Thailand) Rungsan Thipsotikul
Men's doubles	(Indonesia) Alvent Yulianto (Indonesia) Fran Kurniawan	(Japan) Yuki Homma (Japan) Masakazu Mouri	(Japan) Takahito Honbu (Japan) Futoshi Ide
Women's doubles	(Thailand) Molthila Kijanon (Thailand) Vacharaporn Munkit	(Japan) Kanako Jigami (Japan) Yuki Taruno	(Thailand) Wasamon Chokuthaikul (Thailand) Suttapa Ekworrathien
Women's doubles	(Thailand) Molthila Kijanon (Thailand) Vacharaporn Munkit	(Japan) Kanako Jigami (Japan) Yuki Taruno	(Japan) Sakie Sakai (Japan) Azusa Soga
Mixed doubles	(Thailand) Nawut Thanathiratham (Thailand) Vacharaporn Munkit	(Canada) Derrick Ng (United States) Pai Hsiao-ma	(Thailand) Chanyut Suntiparaphop (Thailand) Benjaporn Thienrajkij
Mixed doubles	(Thailand) Nawut Thanathiratham (Thailand) Vacharaporn Munkit	(Canada) Derrick Ng (United States) Pai Hsiao-ma	(India) Mohamed Rehan Raju (India) Anees Kowsar Jamaludeen

== Men's singles ==
=== Seeds ===
1. (Macau) Chao Chun-ken (quarter-finals)
2. (India) Mayank Behal (second round)
3. (Denmark) Lars Rüsz Kaysen (second round)
4. (Switzerland) Pranav Shashank Khot (second round)
5. (Thailand) Tawan Huansuriya (semi-finals; bronze medalist)
6. (Japan) Masakazu Mouri (quarter-finals)
7. (Canada) Derrick Ng (semi-finals; bronze medalist)
8. (Singapore) Aaron Tan (second round)

=== Finals ===
Semi-finals
5/8	(Thailand) Tawan Huansuriya	17	24	13
(Japan) Makoto Aoyama	21	22	21
(New Zealand) Joe Wu	21	21
5/8	(Canada) Derrick Ng	18	14

Final
(Japan) Makoto Aoyama	22	21
(New Zealand) Joe Wu	20	10

=== Top half ===
==== Section 1 ====
First round
(Sweden) T Ahlgren	21	21
(England) A Clark	14	9
(Switzerland) K Waldenberger	21	21
(South Korea) Kim Y-g	6	16
(Australia) T-l Ko	21	21
(Spain) S López	11	17
(India) A Khadgi	21	21
(Sri Lanka) N de Silva	6	1
(Romania) T Iacomi	7	3
(Japan) Y Yamanaka	21	21

Second round
1	(Macau) Chao C-k	21	21
(Sweden) T Ahlgren	11	9
(Mongolia) O Enkhbat
(Switzerland) K Waldenberger	w	/	o
5/8	(Thailand) T Huansuriya	21	21
(Australia) T-l Ko	5	10
(India) A Khadgi	21	18	21
(Japan) Y Yamanaka	16	21	18

Third round
1	(Macau) Chao C-k	21	21
(Switzerland) K Waldenberger	13	9
5/8	(Thailand) T Huansuriya	21	21
(India) A Khadgi	9	6

Quarter-finals
1	(Macau) Chao C-k	15	20
5/8	(Thailand) T Huansuriya	21	22

==== Section 2 ====
First round
(Japan) M Aoyama	21	21
(Chinese Taipei) Chiang S-f	4	12
(South Korea) Cha H-d
(Poland) Z Zimny	w	/	o
(India) K Pal	21	21
(France) M Bouton	10	14
(England) N Kolomnin	21	21
(Mongolia) U Sanjaa	1	0
(Sri Lanka) A K Perera	9	16
(Switzerland) Y Clerc	21	21

Second round
3/4	(Denmark) L R Kaysen	10	15
(Japan) M Aoyama	21	21
(Cambodia) P Saravuth	21	21
(Poland) Z Zimny	13	17
5/8	(Singapore) A Tan	19	24	20
(India) K Pal	21	22	22
(England) N Kolomnin	21	13	21
(Switzerland) Y Clerc	19	21	11

Third round
(Japan) M Aoyama	21	21
(Cambodia) P Saravuth	8	5
(India) K Pal	21	21
(England) N Kolomnin	10	11

Quarter-finals
(Japan) M Aoyama	21	21
(India) K Pal	17	14

=== Bottom half ===
==== Section 3 ====
First round
(Mongolia) M Erdenekhuu	2	2
(Australia) L Chong	21	21
(Germany) K Mayer	13	8
(Macau) Leong K F	21	21
(Sri Lanka) R Thommaya	21	21
(England) M Law	12	17
(Sweden) M Wigardt	21	21
(India) P Aggarwal	7	11
(New Zealand) J Wu	25	21
(Thailand) J Watthanayothin	23	18

Second round
(Australia) L Chong	21	22
(Macau) Leong K F	18	20
(Sri Lanka) R Thommaya	8	12
5/8	(Japan) M Mouri	21	21
(Sweden) M Wigardt	21	21
(South Korea) Cho M-h	6	8
(New Zealand) J Wu	21	21
3/4	(Switzerland) P S Khot	16	8

Third round
(Australia) L Chong	11	9
5/8	(Japan) M Mouri	21	21
(Sweden) M Wigardt	20	21	19
(New Zealand) J Wu	22	18	21

Quarter-finals
5/8	(Japan) M Mouri	22	14	17
(New Zealand) J Wu	20	21	21

==== Section 4 ====
First round
(Denmark) A Gefke	21	14	21
(Poland) A Załęski	13	21	18
(Switzerland) T Scheibling	11	17
(Australia) R Miyamoto	21	21
(South Korea) Park Y-b	w	/	o
(United States) S Mukhtar
(Thailand) W Yingkiatinon	21	21
(Chinese Taipei) Chen H-c	9	10
(Japan) F Ide	21	21
(Sri Lanka) A L Silva	16	10

Second round
(Denmark) A Gefke	21	21
(Australia) R Miyamoto	6	19
(South Korea) Park Y-b
5/8	(Canada) D Ng	w	/	o
(Thailand) W Yingkiatinon	21	16	21
(France) S Lenik	18	21	13
(Japan) F Ide	21	20	21
2	(India) M Behal	10	22	13

Third round
(Denmark) A Gefke	14	11
5/8	(Canada) D Ng	21	21
(Thailand) W Yingkiatinon	7	10
(Japan) F Ide	21	21

Quarter-finals
5/8	(Canada) D Ng	21	22
(Japan) F Ide	11	20

== Women's singles ==
=== Seeds ===
1. (Bulgaria) Maya Dobreva (third round)
2. (Thailand) Molthila Kijanon (third round)
3. (Hong Kong) Fung Ying (quarter-finals)
4. (India) Parul Rawat (quarter-finals)

=== Finals ===
Semi-finals
(Japan) Azusa Soga	19	21	21
(Thailand) Benjaporn Thienrajkij	21	13	23
(Sri Lanka) Nadeesha Gayanthi	10	14
(Japan) Mana Yatabe	21	21

Final
(Thailand) Benjaporn Thienrajkij	18	11
(Japan) Mana Yatabe	21	21

=== Top half ===
==== Section 1 ====
First round
(Japan) A Soga	21	21
(Mongolia) T Khaliun	3	6
(Switzerland) I Bless	2	3
(Chinese Taipei) Hsieh C-m	21	21
(Sweden) C Andersson	9	6
(India) M Sinha	21	21

Second round
1	(Bulgaria) M Dobreva	21	19	10
(Japan) A Soga	12	21	21
(Chinese Taipei) Hsieh C-m	21	21
(India) M Sinha	13	15

Quarter-finals
(Japan) A Soga	w	/	o
(Chinese Taipei) Hsieh C-m

==== Section 2 ====
First round
3/4	(Hong Kong) Fung Y	21	19	21
(Japan) A Kato	19	21	16
(France) C Dubuisson	6	11
(Germany) B Hogrefe	21	21
(Sweden) T Forsberg	6	5
(Thailand) B Thienrajkij	21	21
(Switzerland) F Schnyder	16	14
(India) A Rode	21	21

Second round
3/4	(Hong Kong) Fung Y	21	22
(Germany) B Hogrefe	19	20
(Thailand) B Thienrajkij	21	20	21
(India) A Rode	8	22	9

Quarter-finals
3/4	(Hong Kong) Fung Y	12	10
(Thailand) B Thienrajkij	21	21

=== Bottom hlaf ===
==== Section 3 ====
First round
(Australia) T Luthy	18	21	14
(Germany) D Wolf	21	19	21
(Sri Lanka) N Gayanthi	21	21
(Japan) S Sakai	17	9
(Switzerland) V Scharpmann	18	21	23
(Sweden) L Saarela	21	16	21
(France) M Hermeline	13	15
3/4	(India) P Rawat	21	21

Second round
(Germany) D Wolf	16	18
(Sri Lanka) N Gayanthi	21	21
(Switzerland) V Scharpmann	12	10
3/4	(India) P Rawat	21	21

Quarter-finals
(Sri Lanka) N Gayanthi	21	21
3/4	(India) P Rawat	19	16

==== Section 4 ====
First round
(Germany) S Bannenberg	19	21	21
(South Korea) Song J-w	21	10	16
(Chinese Taipei) Li A-t	w	/	o
(Mongolia) D Tuvshinjargal
(Japan) M Yatabe	21	21
(Switzerland) R Scheibling	5	5
(India) B Bansal	1	2
2	(Thailand) M Kijanon	21	21

Second round
(Germany) S Bannenberg	7	11
(Chinese Taipei) Li A-t	21	21
(Japan) M Yatabe	13	21	21
2	(Thailand) M Kijanon	21	15	15

Quarter-finals
(Chinese Taipei) Li A-t	15	21
(Japan) M Yatabe	21	23

== Men's doubles ==
=== Seeds ===
1. (India) Padmanabha Raghavan / Varun Sharma (third round)
2. (England) Nikita Kolomnin / Mark Law (third round)
3. (Indonesia) Alvent Yulianto / Fran Kurniawan (champion; gold medalists)
4. (Macau) Chao Chun-ken / Leong Kin Fai (quarter-finals)
5. (India) Mayank Behal / Kaushik Pal (quarter-finals)
6. (Canada) Hugh Leung / Derrick Ng (quarter-finals)
7. (Chinese Taipei) Li Cho-chun / Wu En-jin (second round)
8. (Portugal) José Júnior / (South Korea) Yoo Yeon-seong (third round)

=== Finals ===
Semi-finals
(Thailand) Santiphap Kaweenanthawong (Thailand) Rungsan Thipsotikul	19	18
(Japan) Yuki Homma (Japan) Masakazu Mouri	21	21
3/4	(Indonesia) Alvent Yulianto (Indonesia) Fran Kurniawan	21	21
(Japan) Takahito Honbu (Japan) Futoshi Ide	15	10

Final
(Japan) Yuki Homma (Japan) Masakazu Mouri	17	12
3/4	(Indonesia) Alvent Yulianto (Indonesia) Fran Kurniawan	21	21

=== Top half ===
==== Section 1 ====
First round
(Chinese Taipei) Lin B-l (Chinese Taipei) Yu K-c	7	8
(Japan) T Horii (Japan) K Shimizu	21	21
(Cambodia) P Saravuth (Cambodia) M Setha	3	12
(Thailand) S Kaweenanthawong (Thailand) R Thipsotikul	21	21

Second round
1	(India) P Raghavan (India) V Sharma	24	21
(Switzerland) J Fröhlich (Switzerland) K Waldenberger	22	14
(Poland) A Kosz (Poland) A Załęski	15	17
(Japan) T Horii (Japan) K Shimizu	21	21
5/8	(Portugal) J Júnior (South Korea) Yoo Y-s	21	21
(Spain) D Hernansanz (Spain) S López	17	18
(South Korea) Kim J-m (South Korea) King Y-c	6	2
(Thailand) S Kaweenanthawong (Thailand) R Thipsotikul	21	21

Third round
1	(India) P Raghavan (India) V Sharma	21	17	10
(Japan) T Horii (Japan) K Shimizu	18	21	21
5/8	(Portugal) J Júnior (South Korea) Yoo Y-s	15	2
(Thailand) S Kaweenanthawong (Thailand) R Thipsotikul	21	21

Quarter-finals
(Japan) T Horii (Japan) K Shimizu	17	21	12
(Thailand) S Kaweenanthawong (Thailand) R Thipsotikul	21	17	21

==== Section 2 ====
First round
(Singapore) V Chotteyandamada (Singapore) A Tan	21	21
(Germany) K Mayer (Poland) Z Zimny	12	9
(Japan) Y Homma (Japan) M Mouri	21	21
(India) M K Gupta (India) P Naithani	10	8
(England) A Clark (Romania) T Iacomi	15	17
(South Korea) Choi Jae-won (South Korea) Kim Gi-deokd	21	21

Second round
3/4	(Macau) Chao Chun-ken (Macau) Leong Kin Fai	22	22
(Thailand) T Huansuriya (Thailand) Nawut Thanathiratham	20	20
(Sri Lanka) Anushaka Lakshan Silva (Sri Lanka) R Thommaya	21	11	14
(Singapore) Vivek Chotteyandamada (Singapore) A Tan	18	21	21
5/8	(Chinese Taipei) Li C-c (Chinese Taipei) Wu E-j	14	21	8
(Japan) Yuki Homma (Japan) M Mouri	21	18	21
(Sweden) Tomas Ahlgren (Sweden) M Wigardt	21	21
(South Korea) Choi Jae-won (South Korea) Kim Gi-deok	8	10

Third round
3/4	(Macau) Chao Chun-ken (Macau) Leong Kin Fai	15	21	21
(Singapore) Vivek Chotteyandamada (Singapore) Aaron Tan	21	9	14
(Japan) Y Homma (Japan) M Mouri	22	21	21
(Sweden) T Ahlgren (Sweden) M Wigardt	24	10	19

Quarter-finals
3/4	(Macau) Chao C-k (Macau) Leong K F	15	11
(Japan) Y Homma (Japan) M Mouri	21	21

=== Bottom half ===
==== Section 3 ====
First round
(Japan) S Sakemi (Japan) Y Yamanaka	21	21
(South Korea) Moon Y-h (South Korea) Park S-y	12	17
(Denmark) L R Kaysen (Sri Lanka) N de Silva	21	22
(Switzerland) Y Clerc (Switzerland) J Grape	13	20
(Mongolia) M Erdenekhuu (Mongolia) U Sanjaa	10	11
(Sri Lanka) S Kumarasinghe (Sri Lanka) A K Perera	21	21

Second round
(Japan) S Sakemi (Japan) Y Yamanaka	21	21
(Thailand) C Suntiparaphop (Thailand) J Watthanayothin	16	15
(Denmark) L R Kaysen (Sri Lanka) N de Silva	16	27	11
5/8	(India) M Behal (India) K Pal	21	25	21
(Sri Lanka) S Kumarasinghe (Sri Lanka) A K Perera	8	9
(Chinese Taipei) Chang C-s (Chinese Taipei) Wang C-k	21	21
(Australia) R Miyamoto (United States) S Mukhtar
3/4	(Indonesia) A Yulianto (Indonesia) F Kurniawan	w	/	o

Third round
(Japan) S Sakemi (Japan) Y Yamanaka	16	19
5/8	(India) M Behal (India) K Pal	21	21
(Chinese Taipei) Chang C-s (Chinese Taipei) Wang C-k	15	11
3/4	(Indonesia) A Yulianto (Indonesia) F Kurniawan	21	21

Quarter-finals
5/8	(India) M Behal (India) K Pal	11	8
3/4	(Indonesia) A Yulianto (Indonesia) F Kurniawan	21	21

==== Section 4 ====
First round
(France) S Coto (France) S Lenik	14	12
(Chinese Taipei) Chao C-h (Chinese Taipei) Chen P-j	21	21
(Australia) L Chong (Australia) T-l Ko	21	21
(India) D Achariya (India) S Senthi	18	15

Second round
(Chinese Taipei) Chao C-h (Chinese Taipei) Chen P-j	16	21	21
(Denmark) A Gefke (Denmark) J B Marcussen	21	16	14
(Thailand) T Phetchamas (Thailand) M Wongcharoensuk	18	18
5/8	(Canada) H Leung (Canada) D Ng	21	21
(Australia) L Chong (Australia) T-l Ko	13	18
(Japan) T Honbu (Japan) F Ide	21	21
(Switzerland) T Bless (Switzerland) T Scheibling	17	17
2	(England) N Kolomnin (England) M Law	21	21

Third round
(Chinese Taipei) Chao C-h (Chinese Taipei) Chen P-j	16	15
5/8	(Canada) H Leung (Canada) D Ng	21	21
(Japan) T Honbu (Japan) F Ide	23	21
2	(England) N Kolomnin (England) M Law	21	14

Quarter-finals
5/8	(Canada) H Leung (Canada) D Ng	11	21
(Japan) T Honbu (Japan) F Ide	21	23

== Women's doubles ==
=== Seeds ===
1. (India) Sangeetha Mari / Sandya Melasheemi (third round)
2. (Thailand) Molthila Kijanon / Vacharaporn Munkit (champions; gold medalists)
3. (Germany) Stefanie Bannenberg / Britta Hogrefe (first round)
4. (India) Varsha V. Belawadi / Parul Rawat (quarter-finals)
5. (Sweden) Cathrine Andersson / Linda Saarela (quarter-finals)
6. (Hong Kong) Vera Choy / Fung Ying (quarter-finals)
7. (Spain) Patricia Sánchez / Vanessa Serrano (first round)
8. (England) Kelly Fairey / (Denmark) Mai Hasle (first round)

=== Finals ===
Semi-finals
(Japan) Kanako Jigami (Japan) Yuki Taruno	21	12	21
(Thailand) Wasamon Chokuthaikul (Thailand) Suttapa Ekworrathien	19	21	18
(Japan) Sakie Sakai (Japan) Azusa Soga	15	8
2	(Thailand) Molthila Kijanon (Thailand) Vacharaporn Munkit	21	21

Final
(Japan) Kanako Jigami (Japan) Yuki Taruno	18	18
2	(Thailand) Molthila Kijanon (Thailand) Vacharaporn Munkit	21	21

=== Top half ===
==== Section 1 ====
First round
1	(India) S Mari (India) S Melasheemi	21	21
(Poland) M Kołaczkowska (Sri Lanka) N Gayanthi	12	14
(Japan) K Jigami (Japan) Y Taruno	21	21
(Spain) S del Busto (Spain) S Rueda	8	11
5/8	(Sweden) C Andersson (Sweden) L Saarela	21	21
(South Korea) Seo J-y (South Korea) Yoon C-h	11	12
(Chinese Taipei) Chang Y-y (Chinese Taipei) Hsu H-m	21	21
(Thailand) A Khumyat (Thailand) J Muanwong	15	19

Second round
1	(India) S Mari (India) S Melasheemi	11	11
(Japan) K Jigami (Japan) Y Taruno	21	21
5/8	(Sweden) C Andersson (Sweden) L Saarela	21	21
(Chinese Taipei) Chang Y-y (Chinese Taipei) Hsu H-m	15	11

Quarter-finals
(Japan) K Jigami (Japan) Y Taruno	21	21
5/8	(Sweden) C Andersson (Sweden) L Saarela	10	10

==== Section 2 ====
First round
3/4	(Germany) S Bannenberg (Germany) B Hogrefe	18	18
(Japan) N Akimoto (Japan) C Hashio	21	21
(Thailand) Was Chokuthaikul (Thailand) S Ekworrathien	21	21
(South Korea) Kim E-s (South Korea) Kim H-m	14	17
5/8	(Hong Kong) V Choy (Hong Kong) Fung Y	21	21
(Switzerland) I Bless (Switzerland) R Scheibling	5	6
(Chinese Taipei) Chen Y-j (Chinese Taipei) Kao Y-c	21	21
(India) A Chauhan (India) M Kohli	7	9

Second round
(Japan) N Akimoto (Japan) C Hashio	15	17
(Thailand) Was Chokuthaikul (Thailand) S Ekworrathien	21	21
5/8	(Hong Kong) V Choy (Hong Kong) Fung Y	18	4
(Chinese Taipei) Chen Y-j (Chinese Taipei) Kao Y-c	21	0^{r}

Quarter-finals
(Thailand) Was Chokuthaikul (Thailand) S Ekworrathien	21	21
5/8	(Hong Kong) V Choy (Hong Kong) Fung Y	18	9

=== Bottom half ===
==== Section 3 ====
First round
(South Korea) An E-h (South Korea) Park M-j	3	2
(Chinese Taipei) Hsieh C-m (Chinese Taipei) Li A-t	21	21
(Japan) S Sakai (Japan) A Soga	21	21
5/8	(England) K Fairey (Denmark) M Hasle	14	8
(France) C Dubuisson (France) A Pérégrina	12	10
(Germany) H Vogt (Germany) D Wolf	21	21
(Switzerland) V Scharpmann (Switzerland) F Schnyder	16	18
3/4	(India) V V. Belawadi (India) P Rawat	21	21

Second round
(Chinese Taipei) Hsieh C-m (Chinese Taipei) Li A-t
(Japan) S Sakai (Japan) A Soga	w	/	o
(Germany) H Vogt (Germany) D Wolf	13	15
3/4	(India) V V. Belawadi (India) P Rawat	21	21

Quarter-finals
(Japan) S Sakai (Japan) A Soga	21	17	21
3/4	(India) V V. Belawadi (India) P Rawat	19	21	16

==== Section 4 ====
First round
(Japan) A Kato (Japan) M Otsuka	21	21
(Bulgaria) M Dobreva (Australia) T Luthy	15	8
(India) A K Jamaludeen (India) M Sinha	21	21
5/8	(Spain) P Sánchez (Spain) V Serrano	5	8
(South Korea) Choi N-i (South Korea) Lee H-j	7	1
(Chinese Taipei) Chen H-h (Chinese Taipei) Chen H-e	21	21
(Sweden) T Forsberg (France) M Hermeline	9	3
2	(Thailand) M Kijanon (Thailand) V Munkit	21	21

Second round
(Japan) A Kato (Japan) M Otsuka	21	21
(India) A K Jamaludeen (India) M Sinha	9	12
(Chinese Taipei) Chen H-h (Chinese Taipei) Chen H-e	12	12
2	(Thailand) M Kijanon (Thailand) V Munkit	21	21

Quarter-finals
(Japan) A Kato (Japan) M Otsuka	14	8
2	(Thailand) M Kijanon (Thailand) V Munkit	21	21

== Mixed doubles ==
=== Seeds ===
1. (India) Abhinand Shetty / Sangeetha Mari (quarter-finals)
2. (Thailand) Atipong Kitjanon / Molthila Kijanon (quarter-finals)
3. (Hong Kong) Fung Sin Kei / Vera Choy (third round)
4. (United States) Ajit Umrani / (Bulgaria) Maya Dobreva (third round)
5. (India) Mohamed Rehan Raju / Anees Kowsar Jamaludeen (semi-finals; bronze medalsits)
6. (Thailand) Nawut Thanathiratham / Vacharaporn Munkit (champion; gold medalsits)
7. (England) Mark Law / (Germany) Britta Hogrefe (quarter-finals)
8. (Canada) Derrick Ng / (United States) Pai Hsiao-ma (final; silver medalsits)

=== Finals ===
Semi-finals
5/8	(Thailand) Nawut Thanathiratham (Thailand) Vacharaporn Munkit	21	21
(Thailand) Chanyut Suntiparaphop (Thailand) Benjaporn Thienrajkij	18	8
5/8	(India) Mohamed Rehan Raju (India) Anees Kowsar Jamaludeen	6	13
5/8	(Canada) Derrick Ng (United States) Pai Hsiao-ma	21	21

Final
5/8	(Thailand) Nawut Thanathiratham (Thailand) Vacharaporn Munkit	21	21
5/8	(Canada) Derrick Ng (United States) Pai Hsiao-ma	18	14

=== Top half ===
==== Section 1 ====
First round
(Switzerland) T Bless (Switzerland) F Schnyder	17	17
(France) S Lenik (France) C Dubuisson	21	21
(Hong Kong) Ng C K (Hong Kong) Fung Y	21	21
(England) A Clark (Germany) S Bannenberg	13	17
(Japan) Y Kamegamori (Japan) M Otsuka	21	21
(Sri Lanka) R Thommaya (Romania) I Sanderson	10	10

Second round
1	(India) A Shetty (India) S Mari	21	21
(South Korea) Kim Y-s (South Korea) Choi M-s	10	8
(Denmark) J B Marcussen (Denmark) M Hasle	21	21
(France) S Lenik (France) C Dubuisson	13	14
5/8	(Thailand) N Thanathiratham (Thailand) V Munkit	21	21
(Hong Kong) Ng C K (Hong Kong) Fung Y	8	13
(Chinese Taipei) Wang C-k (Chinese Taipei) Chiang C-h	11	11
(Japan) Y Kamegamori (Japan) M Otsuka	21	21

Third round
1	(India) A Shetty (India) S Mari	17	21	21
(Denmark) J B Marcussen (Denmark) M Hasle	21	19	18
5/8	(Thailand) N Thanathiratham (Thailand) V Munkit	23	21
(Japan) Y Kamegamori (Japan) M Otsuka	21	18

Quarter-finals
1	(India) A Shetty (India) S Mari	12	8
5/8	(Thailand) N Thanathiratham (Thailand) V Munkit	21	21

==== Section 2 ====
First round
(Poland) Z Zimny (Sweden) L Saarela	9	16
(India) M Behal (India) A Rode	21	21
(Chinese Taipei) Chang C-s (Chinese Taipei) Chen H-e	21	21
(England) N Kolomnin (Sri Lanka) N Gayanthi	18	14
(Denmark) L R Kaysen (Switzerland) V Scharpmann	12	17
(Japan) K Shimizu (Japan) K Jigami	21	21

Second round
3/4	(United States) A Umrani (Bulgaria) M Dobreva	w	/	o
(South Korea) Cha H-d (South Korea) Song J-w
(Thailand) C Suntiparaphop (Thailand) B Thienrajkij	24	21
(India) M Behal (India) A Rode	22	14
5/8	(England) M Law (Germany) B Hogrefe	18	21	23
(Chinese Taipei) Chang C-s (Chinese Taipei) Chen H-e	21	13	21
(Sweden) T Ahlgren (Sweden) W Fredriksson
(Japan) K Shimizu (Japan) K Jigami	w	/	o

Third round
3/4	(United States) A Umrani (Bulgaria) M Dobreva	21	18	15
(Thailand) C Suntiparaphop (Thailand) B Thienrajkij	18	21	21
5/8	(England) M Law (Germany) B Hogrefe	14	21	23
(Japan) K Shimizu (Japan) K Jigami	21	17	21

Quarter-finals
(Thailand) C Suntiparaphop (Thailand) B Thienrajkij	21	21
5/8	(England) M Law (Germany) B Hogrefe	9	19

=== Bottom half ===
==== Section 3 ====
First round
(Spain) S López (Spain) S Rueda	14	12
(Australia) L Chong (Australia) T Luthy	21	21
(Japan) M Aoyama (Japan) Y Taruno	21	25
(Thailand) Wat Chokuthaikul (Thailand) Was Chokuthaikul	15	23
(Switzerland) T Scheibling (Switzerland) R Scheibling	13	15
(South Korea) Kang T-g (South Korea) Jung M	21	21

Second round
(Australia) L Chong (Australia) T Luthy	19	22	21
(Chinese Taipei) Lin B-l (Chinese Taipei) Chen H-h	21	20	9
(Japan) M Aoyama (Japan) Y Taruno	4	8
5/8	(India) M R Raju (India) A K Jamaludeen	21	21
(South Korea) Kang T-g (South Korea) Jung M	11	13
(Poland) A Załęski (Poland) D Guzik-Płuchowska	21	21
(Sri Lanka) N de Silva (Sweden) T Forsberg	15	7
3/4	(Hong Kong) Fung S K (Hong Kong) V Choy	21	21

Third round
(Australia) L Chong (Australia) T Luthy	22	10
5/8	(India) M R Raju (India) A K Jamaludeen	24	21
(Poland) A Załęski (Poland) D Guzik-Płuchowska	24	22
3/4	(Hong Kong) Fung S K (Hong Kong) V Choy	22	20

Quarter-finals
5/8	(India) M R Raju (India) A K Jamaludeen	21	21
(Poland) A Załęski (Poland) D Guzik-Płuchowska	13	9

==== Section 4 ====
First round
(Japan) H Okano (Japan) M Sawada	21	21
(Mongolia) U Sanjaa (Mongolia) T Khaliun	7	3
(Chinese Taipei) Wu E-j (Chinese Taipei) Kao Y-c	21	21
(Switzerland) Y Clerc (Switzerland) I Bless	10	17
(France) M Seignez (France) M Hermeline	18	14
SUB	(India) P Naithani (India) V V. Belawadi	21	21

Second round
(Japan) H Okano (Japan) M Sawada	21	21
(Germany) K Mayer (Germany) D Wolf	15	13
(Chinese Taipei) Wu E-j (Chinese Taipei) Kao Y-c	17	12
5/8	(Canada) D Ng (United States) Pai H-m	21	21
(India) P Naithani (India) V V. Belawadi	21	21
(South Korea) Moon Y-h (South Korea) Kim H-r	17	7
(Sweden) M Bachtiar (Sweden) C Andersson	11	12
2	(Thailand) A Kitjanon (Thailand) M Kijanon	21	21

Third round
(Japan) H Okano (Japan) M Sawada	11	15
5/8	(Canada) D Ng (United States) Pai H-m	21	21
(India) P Naithani (India) V V. Belawadi	5	15
2	(Thailand) A Kitjanon (Thailand) M Kijanon	21	21

Quarter-finals
5/8	(Canada) D Ng (United States) Pai H-m	21	21
2	(Thailand) A Kitjanon (Thailand) M Kijanon	9	18
