= Vacharaporn Munkit =

Thai badminton player (born 1987)

Personal information
- Born: 2 July 1987 (age 39)

Sport
- Country: Thailand
- Sport: Badminton

Women's & mixed doubles
- Highest ranking: 10 (WD) 13 May 2010; 56 (XD) 2 May 2013
- BWF profile
Medal record
Badminton
Representing Thailand
World Senior Championships
Gold medal – first place	2023 Jeonju	Women's doubles 35+
Gold medal – first place	2023 Jeonju	Mixed doubles 35+
Silver medal – second place	2025 Pattaya	Mixed doubles 35+
Asian Games
Silver medal – second place	2010 Guangzhou	Women's team
Asia Championships
Bronze medal – third place	2010 New Delhi	Women's doubles
Southeast Asian Games
Bronze medal – third place	2009 Vientiane	Women's doubles
Bronze medal – third place	2009 Vientiane	Women's team

Vacharaporn Munkit (Thai: วัชราภรณ์ มั่นกิจ; born 2 July 1987) also known as Punyada Munkitchokecharoen (Thai: ปัญญดา มั่นกิจโชคเจริญ), Peeraya Munkitamorn (Thai: พีรญา มั่นกิจอมร) is a Thai badminton player. In 2009, she competed at the Southeast Asian Games and won two bronze medals in the women's doubles and team event. Munkit also won 2010 Asian Championships bronze in the women's doubles event, and Asian Games silver in the women's team event.

== Achievements ==
=== World Senior Championships ===
Women's doubles
Year	Age	Venue	Partner	Opponent	Score	Result
2023	35+	Hwasan Indoor Stadium; Jeonju, South Korea	(Thailand) Molthila Kijanon	(Japan) Kanako Jigami (Japan) Yuki Taruno	21–18, 21–18	Gold

Mixed doubles
Year	Age	Venue	Partner	Opponent	Score	Result	Ref.
2023	35+	Hwasan Indoor Stadium; Jeonju, South Korea	(Thailand) Nawut Thanathiratham	(Canada) Derrick Ng (United States) Pai Hsiao-ma	21–18, 21–14	Gold	
2025	35+	Eastern National Sports Training Centre; Pattaya, Thailand	(Thailand) Nawut Thanateeratam	(Indonesia) Hendra Setiawan (Indonesia) Debby Susanto	5–21, 9–21	Silver	

=== Asian Championships ===
Women's doubles
Year	Venue	Partner	Opponent	Score	Result
2010	Siri Fort Indoor Stadium; New Delhi, India	(Thailand) Savitree Amitrapai	(Malaysia) Vivian Kah Mun Hoo (Malaysia) Woon Khe Wei	21–18, 17–21, 14–21	Bronze

=== Southeast Asian Games ===
Women's doubles
Year	Venue	Partner	Opponent	Score	Result
2009	National Sports Complex; Vientiane, Laos	(Thailand) Savitree Amitrapai	(Singapore) Shinta Mulia Sari (Singapore) Yao Lei	20–22, 21–12, 19–21	Bronze

=== BWF Grand Prix ===
The BWF Grand Prix has two level such as Grand Prix and Grand Prix Gold. It is a series of badminton tournaments, sanctioned by Badminton World Federation (BWF) since 2007.

Women's doubles
Year	Tournament	Partner	Opponent	Score	Result
2009	Vietnam Open	(Thailand) Savitree Amitrapai	(Indonesia) Anneke Feinya Agustin (Indonesia) Annisa Wahyuni	14–21, 13–21	(silver) Runner-up

BWF Grand Prix Gold tournament
BWF Grand Prix tournament

=== BWF International Challenge/Series ===
Mixed doubles
Year	Tournament	Partner	Opponent	Score	Result
2009	Smiling Fish International	(Thailand) Thitipong Lapho	(Thailand) Patipat Chalardchaleam (Thailand) Savitree Amitapai	10–21, 19–21	(silver) Runner-up

BWF International Challenge tournament
BWF International Series tournament
