= 2012 Indonesian Masters Grand Prix Gold =

Tournament details
- Dates: 25 September 2012 – 30 September 2012
- Edition: 3rd
- Total prize money: US$120,000
- Venue: Palembang Sport and Convention Center
- Location: Palembang, South Sumatra, Indonesia

Champions
- Men's singles: (Indonesia) Sony Dwi Kuncoro
- Women's singles: (China) Han Li
- Men's doubles: (South Korea) Kim Gi-jung (South Korea) Kim Sa-rang
- Women's doubles: (Japan) Misaki Matsutomo (Japan) Ayaka Takahashi
- Mixed doubles: (Indonesia) Tontowi Ahmad (Indonesia) Liliyana Natsir

The 2012 Indonesian Masters Grand Prix Gold was the tenth grand prix gold and grand prix tournament of the 2012 BWF Grand Prix Gold and Grand Prix. The tournament was held in Palembang Sport and Convention Center, Palembang, South Sumatra, Indonesia September 25 until September 30, 2012 and had a total purse of $120,000.

== Men's singles ==
=== Seeds ===
1. (Indonesia) Simon Santoso (quarter-final)
2. (Japan) Sho Sasaki (quarter-final)
3. (Indonesia) Tommy Sugiarto (quarter-final)
4. (Indonesia) Dionysius Hayom Rumbaka (final)
5. (Indonesia) Sony Dwi Kuncoro (champion)
6. (Indonesia) Alamsyah Yunus (semi-final)
7. (Malaysia) Mohd Arif Abdul Latif (quarter-final)
8. (Indonesia) Andre Kurniawan Tedjono (second round)
9. (Malaysia) Ramdan Misbun (third round)
10. (Malaysia) Chan Kwong Beng (withdrew)
11. (Malaysia) Zulfadli Zulkiffli (third round)
12. (South Korea) Hong Ji-hoon (third round)
13. (Malaysia) Goh Soon Huat (third round)
14. (Malaysia) Iskandar Zulkarnain Zainuddin (third round)
15. (England) Andrew Smith (third round)
16. (China) Chen Yuekun (third round)

=== Finals ===
Quarterfinals
1	(Indonesia) Simon Santoso	17	13
6	(Indonesia) Alamsyah Yunus	21	21
4	(Indonesia) D Hayom Rumbaka	21	8	22
7	(Malaysia) Mohd Arif Abdul Latif	10	21	20
(China) Gao Huan	21	15	21
3	(Indonesia) Tommy Sugiarto	16	21	16
5	(Indonesia) Sony Dwi Kuncoro	21	14	21
2	(Japan) Sho Sasaki	17	21	13

Semifinals
6	(Indonesia) Alamsyah Yunus	21	10	14
4	(Indonesia) D Hayom Rumbaka	19	21	21
(China) Gao Huan	19	8
5	(Indonesia) Sony Dwi Kuncoro	21	21

Final
4	(Indonesia) D Hayom Rumbaka	11	11
5	(Indonesia) Sony Dwi Kuncoro	21	21

=== Top half ===
==== Section 1 ====
First Round
1	(Indonesia) S Santoso	21	21
(Japan) K Momota	10	16
(Indonesia) W Triansyah	11	10
(South Korea) Park S-m	21	21
16	(China) Chen YK	21	21
(Indonesia) K Alexander	15	10
(Indonesia) I Dharma	21	21
Q7	(Indonesia) R Antasari	16	15

Second Round
1	(Indonesia) S Santoso	21	21
(South Korea) Park S-m	7	12
16	(China) Chen YK	21	21
(Indonesia) I Dharma	4	11

Third Round
1	(Indonesia) S Santoso	21	21	21
16	(China) Chen YK	23	12	14

==== Section 2 ====
First Round
6	(Indonesia) A Yunus	21	21
(Malaysia) Goh GC	18	12
(Indonesia) A Pratama	21	21
Q4	(Indonesia) C Briand	8	7
11	(Malaysia) Zf Zulkiffli	21	21
(Indonesia) F Hadmadi	16	8
(Indonesia) F Irvannaldy	22	21
Q8	(Indonesia) M Pangisthu	20	18

Second Round
6	(Indonesia) A Yunus	13	21	21
(Indonesia) A Pratama	21	18	17
11	(Malaysia) Zf Zulkiffli	21	21
(Indonesia) F Irvannaldy	16	8

Third Round
6	(Indonesia) A Yunus	21	21
11	(Malaysia) Zf Zulkiffli	19	17

==== Section 3 ====
First Round
4	(Indonesia) D Rumbaka	21	21
Q5	(Indonesia) N Ermansyah	12	9
(Indonesia) A Marteen	18	12
(Japan) S Zeniya	21	21
14	(Malaysia) I Zainuddin	21	21
(Indonesia) I Mustofa	15	6
(Indonesia) Siswanto	21	21
Q3	(Indonesia) E Kusuma	13	11

Second Round
4	(Indonesia) D Rumbaka	21	22
(Japan) S Zeniya	19	20
14	(Malaysia) I Zainuddin	21	21
(Indonesia) Siswanto	13	19

Third Round
4	(Indonesia) D Rumbaka	21	16	21
14	(Malaysia) I Zainuddin	12	21	17

==== Section 4 ====
First Round
7	(Malaysia) A Abdul Latif	21	21
(Indonesia) I Wirawan	14	17
(Malaysia) Loh WS	9	19
(Indonesia) A Ramadhan	21	21
PFQ	(China) Guo K	21	21
(Indonesia) P Sudrajat	19	19
(Indonesia) R Budhiawan	17	21
Q1	(Indonesia) M Firdaus	21	23

Second Round
7	(Malaysia) A Abdul Latif	21	21
(Indonesia) A Ramadhan	19	19
PFQ	(China) Guo K	21	14	21
Q1	(Indonesia) M Firdaus	9	21	6

Third Round
7	(Malaysia) A Abdul Latif	21	21
PFQ	(China) Guo K	14	14

=== Bottom half ===
==== Section 5 ====
First Round
(South Korea) Ha Y-w	13	21	17
(Malaysia) N Ayub	21	12	21
(Indonesia) A Dharma	14	15
12	(South Korea) Hong J-h	21	21
(Indonesia) G Adwitya	17	7
(China) Gao H	21	21
(Malaysia) Zh Zulkiffli	13	10
8	(Indonesia) A Tedjono	21	21

Second Round
(Malaysia) N Ayub	21	18	16
12	(South Korea) Hong J-h	18	21	21
(China) Gao H	21	21
8	(Indonesia) A Tedjono	8	10

Third Round
12	(South Korea) Hong J-h	11	12
(China) Gao H	21	21

==== Section 6 ====
First Round
(Indonesia) R Megananda	23	21	21
(Singapore) R Gonansa	25	13	17
(Indonesia) T Mahbub	10	19
13	(Malaysia) Goh SH	21	21
(Indonesia) W Prasetyo	21	17	21
(Japan) R Takeshita	18	21	7
(China) Tian HW	15	16
3	(Indonesia) T Sugiarto	21	21

Second Round
(Indonesia) R Megananda	13	17
13	(Malaysia) Goh SH	21	21
(Indonesia) W Prasetyo	10	16
3	(Indonesia) T Sugiarto	21	21

Third Round
13	(Malaysia) Goh SH	16	22	12
3	(Indonesia) T Sugiarto	21	20	21

==== Section 7 ====
First Round
(Malaysia) Chiang JS	21	21
(Indonesia) A Rivai	16	10
(Indonesia) A Kusuma	12	21	17
15	(England) A Smith	21	19	21
Q6	(Indonesia) S Wibowo	21	21
(Indonesia) K Wibowo	14	10
PFQ	(Indonesia) A Januari	12	11
5	(Indonesia) S Kuncoro	21	21

Second Round
(Malaysia) Chiang JS	17	16
15	(England) A Smith	21	21
Q6	(Indonesia) S Wibowo	16	13
5	(Indonesia) S Kuncoro	21	21

Third Round
15	(England) A Smith	21	7	13
5	(Indonesia) S Kuncoro	14	21	21

==== Section 8 ====
First Round
Q2	(Indonesia) R Ivanudin	8	13
(Indonesia) S Setia Putra	21	21
(Indonesia) R Subagja	14	8
9	(Malaysia) R Misbun	21	21
PFQ	(South Korea) Kim M-k	18	21	21
(Vietnam) Pham CC	21	16	12
(Indonesia) E Sukamta	13	17
2	(Japan) S Sasaki	21	21

Second Round
(Indonesia) S Setia Putra	11	14
9	(Malaysia) R Misbun	21	21
PFQ	(South Korea) Kim M-k	13	8
2	(Japan) S Sasaki	21	21

Third Round
9	(Malaysia) R Misbun	21	15	18
2	(Japan) S Sasaki	16	21	21

== Women's singles ==
=== Seeds ===
1. (China) Liu Xin (first round)
2. (China) Han Li (champion)
3. (Singapore) Xing Aiying (second round)
4. (Indonesia) Bellaetrix Manuputty (first round)
5. (Indonesia) Maria Febe Kusumastuti (first round)
6. (Indonesia) Aprilia Yuswandari (quarter-final)
7. (Indonesia) Adriyanti Firdasari (semi-final)
8. (Indonesia) Hera Desi (quarter-final)

=== Finals ===
Semifinals
(Indonesia) Yeni Asmarani	21	24
7	(Indonesia) Adriyanti Firdasari	15	22
(Indonesia) Lindaweni Fanetri	20	18
2	(China) Han Li	22	21

Final
(Indonesia) Yeni Asmarani	12	10
2	(China) Han Li	21	21

=== Top half ===
==== Section 1 ====
First Round
1	(China) Liu X	13	21	13
(Indonesia) T Ningrum	21	15	21
(Indonesia) R Suwarno	21	20	26
Q1	(Indonesia) G Rahmadani	18	22	24
5	(Indonesia) M Kusumastuti	16	14
Q2	(China) Deng X	21	21
(Indonesia) Y Asmarani	21	16	21
(South Korea) Kim S-j	18	21	11

Second Round
(Indonesia) T Ningrum	12	17
(Indonesia) R Suwarno	21	21
Q2	(China) Deng X	14	19
(Indonesia) Y Asmarani	21	21

Quarterfinals
(Indonesia) R Suwarno	13	21	17
(Indonesia) Y Asmarani	21	16	21

==== Section 2 ====
First Round
3	(Singapore) Xing AY	21	21
(Indonesia) M Nadhir	15	19
Q4	(Indonesia) R Riodingin	21	21
(Malaysia) Yang LL	13	19
7	(Indonesia) A Firdasari	21	21
(Japan) S Uchida	17	13
(Indonesia) M Wiranto	17	10
(Japan) S Takahashi	21	21

Second Round
3	(Singapore) Xing AY	22	21	15
Q4	(Indonesia) R Riodingin	20	23	21
7	(Indonesia) A Firdasari	13	21	23
(Japan) S Takahashi	21	13	21

Quarterfinals
Q4	(Indonesia) R Riodingin	15	14
7	(Indonesia) A Firdasari	21	21

=== Bottom half ===
==== Section 3 ====
First Round
(Japan) K Ito	21	21
(Chinese Taipei) Chang Y-l	14	11
(South Korea) Jung M-j	16	16
8	(Indonesia) H Desi	21	21
(Malaysia) S Cheah	10	11
(Indonesia) L Fanetri	21	21
(Japan) N Okuhara	20	21	21
4	(Indonesia) B Manuputty	22	16	15

Second Round
(Japan) K Ito	18	6
8	(Indonesia) H Desi	21	21
(Indonesia) L Fanetri	22	21
(Japan) N Okuhara	20	14

Quarterfinals
8	(Indonesia) H Desi	17	17
(Indonesia) L Fanetri	21	21

==== Section 4 ====
First Round
Q3	(Indonesia) R Pungkasari	11	15
PFQ	(Japan) A Ohori	21	21
(Singapore) Chen JY	19	19
6	(Indonesia) A Yuswandari	21	21
(China) Yao X	21	11	14
(Indonesia) F Angguni	17	21	21
(Indonesia) A Rovita	10	14
2	(China) Han L	21	21

Second Round
PFQ	(Japan) A Ohori	8	20
6	(Indonesia) A Yuswandari	21	22
(Indonesia) F Angguni	6	9
2	(China) Han L	21	21

Quarterfinals
6	(Indonesia) A Yuswandari	18	18
2	(China) Han L	21	21

== Men's doubles ==
=== Seeds ===
1. (Indonesia) Mohammad Ahsan / Bona Septano (withdrew)
2. (Japan) Hirokatsu Hashimoto / Noriyasu Hirata (first round)
3. (South Korea) Kim Ki-jung / Kim Sa-rang (champion)
4. (Indonesia) Angga Pratama / Rian Agung Saputro (final)
5. (Malaysia) Hoon Thien How / Tan Wee Kiong (first round)
6. (Malaysia) Mohd Zakry Abdul Latif / Mohd Fairuzizuan Mohd Tazari (first round)
7. (Indonesia) Ricky Karanda Suwardi / Muhammad Ulinnuha (second round)
8. (Indonesia) Markus Fernaldi Gideon / Agripinna Prima Rahmanto Putra (quarter-final)

=== Finals ===
Semifinals
(Indonesia) Yonathan Suryatama (Indonesia) Hendra Aprida Gunawan	22	15	15
3	(South Korea) Kim Ki-jung (South Korea) Kim Sa-rang	20	21	21
4	(Indonesia) Angga Pratama (Indonesia) Rian Agung Saputro	21	21	21
(Indonesia) Hafiz Faisal (Indonesia) Putra Eka Rhoma	23	10	11

Final
3	(South Korea) Kim Ki-jung (South Korea) Kim Sa-rang	21	21
4	(Indonesia) Angga Pratama (Indonesia) Rian Agung Saputro	13	9

=== Top half ===
==== Section 1 ====
First Round
PFQ	(Indonesia) K A Haryanto (Indonesia) S Sudrajad	18	17
(Singapore) T Yeo (Singapore) Liu Y	21	21
(Indonesia) A Adistia (Indonesia) C Rusdianto	13	21	21
(Japan) T Kamura (Japan) K Sonoda	21	19	19
6	(Malaysia) Z Abdul Latif (Malaysia) F Tazari	20	21	21
(Indonesia) R Adianto (Indonesia) B Angriawan	22	18	23
(Indonesia) Y Suryatama (Indonesia) H Gunawan	21	21
Q3	(Japan) T Kurose (Japan) K Yasumura	13	17

Second Round
(Singapore) T Yeo (Singapore) Liu Y	23	20
(Indonesia) A Adistia (Indonesia) C Rusdianto	25	22
(Indonesia) R Adianto (Indonesia) B Angriawan	21	12	19
(Indonesia) Y Suryatama (Indonesia) H Gunawan	17	21	21

Quarterfinals
(Indonesia) A Adistia (Indonesia) C Rusdianto	19	15
(Indonesia) Y Suryatama (Indonesia) H Gunawan	21	21

==== Section 2 ====
First Round
3	(South Korea) Kim K-j (South Korea) Kim S-r	21	21
(Indonesia) Y Sugiarto (Indonesia) A Wirawan	18	14
Q1	(Indonesia) R Nugroho (Indonesia) K Sukamuljo	17	14
(Indonesia) R Alexander (Indonesia) S Geh	21	21
8	(Indonesia) M Gideon (Indonesia) A Putra	22	21
Q4	(China) Li JH (China) Liu YC	20	19
(Indonesia) R Rianto (Indonesia) S Kusdianto	15	12
Q2	(Philippines) R Estanislao (Philippines) P Vivas	21	21

Second Round
3	(South Korea) Kim K-j (South Korea) Kim S-r	23	22	21
(Indonesia) R Alexander (Indonesia) S Geh	21	24	12
8	(Indonesia) M Gideon (Indonesia) A Putra	21	23
Q2	(Philippines) R Estanislao (Philippines) P Vivas	12	21

Quarterfinals
3	(South Korea) Kim K-j (South Korea) Kim S-r	21	16	22
8	(Indonesia) M Gideon (Indonesia) A Putra	16	21	20

=== Bottom half ===
==== Section 3 ====
First Round
(Malaysia) Low JS (Malaysia) Tan YJ	23	12
(Indonesia) M Kido (Indonesia) T Kusharyanto	25	21
(Indonesia) R Wijaya (Indonesia) R Sukmawan	21	16	21
5	(Malaysia) Hoon TH (Malaysia) Tan WK	17	21	15
(Malaysia) N Heg (Malaysia) Teo EY	17	15
(Indonesia) W Nayaka (Indonesia) A Yusuf	21	21
PFQ	(Indonesia) A Aldiartama (Indonesia) E Subaktiar	16	17
4	(Indonesia) A Pratama (Indonesia) R Saputro	21	21

Second Round
(Indonesia) M Kido (Indonesia) T Kusharyanto	15	21	18
(Indonesia) R Wijaya (Indonesia) R Sukmawan	21	18	21
(Indonesia) W Nayaka (Indonesia) A Yusuf	17	12
4	(Indonesia) A Pratama (Indonesia) R Saputro	21	21

Quarterfinals
(Indonesia) R Wijaya (Indonesia) R Sukmawan	14	17
4	(Indonesia) A Pratama (Indonesia) R Saputro	21	21

==== Section 4 ====
First Round
(South Korea) Kang J-w (South Korea) Lee S-j	20	10
(Indonesia) D Indrianto (Indonesia) P Jordan	22	21
(Malaysia) Chooi KM (Malaysia) Ow YH	16	18
7	(Indonesia) R Suwardi (Indonesia) M Ulinnuha	21	21
(Indonesia) H Faisal (Indonesia) P Rhoma	20	21	21
(Philippines) P Escueta (Philippines) P Magnaye	22	12	18
(Malaysia) L Abdul Khalid (Malaysia) Teo KS	21	21
2	(Japan) H Hashimoto (Japan) N Hirata	16	15

Second Round
(Indonesia) D Indrianto (Indonesia) P Jordan	21	16	21
7	(Indonesia) R Suwardi (Indonesia) M Ulinnuha	19	21	18
(Indonesia) H Faisal (Indonesia) P Rhoma	13	21	22
(Malaysia) L Abdul Khalid (Malaysia) Teo KS	21	16	20

Quarterfinals
(Indonesia) D Indrianto (Indonesia) P Jordan	15	16
(Indonesia) H Faisal (Indonesia) P Rhoma	21	21

== Women's doubles ==
=== Seeds ===
1. (Japan) Misaki Matsutomo / Ayaka Takahashi (champion)
2. (South Korea) Eom Hye-won / Jang Ye-na (final)
3. (Indonesia) Anneke Feinya Agustin / Nitya Krishinda Maheswari (quarter-final)
4. (Malaysia) Vivian Hoo Kah Mun / Woon Khe Wei (first round)
5. (Indonesia) Vita Marissa / Nadya Melati (second round)
6. (Indonesia) Pia Zebadiah Bernadeth / Rizki Amelia Pradipta (semi-final)
7. (Japan) Koharu Yonemoto / Yuriko Miki (second round)
8. (Indonesia) Suci Rizki Andini / Della Destiara Haris (quarter-final)

=== Finals ===
Semifinals
1	(Japan) Misaki Matsutomo (Japan) Ayaka Takahashi	21	21
6	(Indonesia) Pia Zebadiah Bernadeth (Indonesia) Rizki Amelia Pradipta	14	19
Q3	(China) Chen Qingchen (China) Huang Dongping	14	22	17
2	(South Korea) Eom Hye-won (South Korea) Jang Ye-na	21	20	21

Final
1	(Japan) Misaki Matsutomo (Japan) Ayaka Takahashi	21	12	21
2	(South Korea) Eom Hye-won (South Korea) Jang Ye-na	12	21	13

=== Top half ===
==== Section 1 ====
First Round
1	(Japan) M Matsutomo (Japan) A Takahashi	21	21
(Indonesia) A Darajat (Indonesia) N Kwanrico	8	6
(Indonesia) R Amelia (Indonesia) D Medita	21	21	18
Q1	(Indonesia) S Kurniawan (Indonesia) T Ningrum	23	14	21
8	(Indonesia) S Andini (Indonesia) D Haris	21	21
(Singapore) V Neo (Singapore) D Yuliana	19	10
Q4	(Indonesia) A Cahyani (Indonesia) M Lestari	19	23
(Indonesia) T Resmi (Indonesia) D Setiawati	21	25

Second Round
1	(Japan) M Matsutomo (Japan) A Takahashi	14	21	21
Q1	(Indonesia) S Kurniawan (Indonesia) T Ningrum	21	9	12
8	(Indonesia) S Andini (Indonesia) D Haris	21	21
(Indonesia) T Resmi (Indonesia) D Setiawati	17	18

Quarterfinals
1	(Japan) M Matsutomo (Japan) A Takahashi	21	21
8	(Indonesia) S Andini (Indonesia) D Haris	13	19

==== Section 2 ====
First Round
3	(Indonesia) A Agustin (Indonesia) N Maheswari	21	21
(Malaysia) Lai SJ (Malaysia) Lim YL	16	15
(Indonesia) G Imawan (Indonesia) T Nuraidah	21	18	22
(Indonesia) V Aprilsasi (Indonesia) L Nurlita	14	21	20
6	(Indonesia) P Z Bernadeth (Indonesia) R Pradipta	21	21
(South Korea) Choi H-i (South Korea) Kim S-y	17	13
Q2	(Indonesia) A Lana (Indonesia) P Sekartaji	21	21	13
PFQ	(Indonesia) I Khairunnisa (Indonesia) M Giovani	23	13	21

Second Round
3	(Indonesia) A Agustin (Indonesia) N Maheswari	21	21
(Indonesia) G Imawan (Indonesia) T Nuraidah	17	12
6	(Indonesia) P Z Bernadeth (Indonesia) R Pradipta	21	21
PFQ	(Indonesia) I Khairunnisa (Indonesia) M Giovani	12	13

Quarterfinals
3	(Indonesia) A Agustin (Indonesia) N Maheswari	15	22
6	(Indonesia) P Z Bernadeth (Indonesia) R Pradipta	21	24

=== Bottom half ===
==== Section 3 ====
First Round
Q3	(China) Chen QC (China) Huang DP	21	21
(Indonesia) M D Oktavianti (Indonesia) R Putri Sari	11	16
(Indonesia) K Dewi (Indonesia) J Gozali	21	12	14
7	(Japan) K Yonemoto (Japan) Y Miki	18	21	21
(Japan) Y Fukushima (Japan) Y Miyauchi	21	21
(Indonesia) A Ratnasari (Indonesia) M Rosita	17	15
(Indonesia) S Aulia (Indonesia) A Awanda	21	21
4	(Malaysia) V Hoo (Malaysia) Woon KW	18	13

Second Round
Q3	(China) Chen QC (China) Huang DP	21	21	21
7	(Japan) K Yonemoto (Japan) Y Miki	13	23	16
(Japan) Y Fukushima (Japan) Y Miyauchi	21	13	19
(Indonesia) S Aulia (Indonesia) A Awanda	17	21	21

Quarterfinals
Q3	(China) Chen QC (China) Huang DP	21	21
(Indonesia) S Aulia (Indonesia) A Awanda	14	11

==== Section 4 ====
First Round
(China) Yu XH (China) Huang YQ	21	21
(Indonesia) M Oklamona (Indonesia) K Rosmini	10	12
(Singapore) Chen JY (Singapore) Xing AY	19	18
5	(Indonesia) V Marissa (Indonesia) N Melati	21	21
(Malaysia) Lai PJ (Malaysia) M Ng	19	21	21
(Indonesia) K Hanadia (Indonesia) D Permatasari	21	18	15
(Indonesia) A Budiharti (Indonesia) D Fitriani	11	16
2	(South Korea) Eom H-w (South Korea) Jang Y-n	21	21

Second Round
(China) Yu XH (China) Huang YQ	21	18	21
5	(Indonesia) V Marissa (Indonesia) N Melati	11	21	15
(Malaysia) Lai PJ (Malaysia) M Ng	11	16
2	(South Korea) Eom H-w (South Korea) Jang Y-n	21	21

Quarterfinals
(China) Yu XH (China) Huang YQ	6	12
2	(South Korea) Eom H-w (South Korea) Jang Y-n	21	21

== Mixed doubles ==
=== Seeds ===
1. (Indonesia) Tontowi Ahmad / Lilyana Natsir (champion)
2. (Indonesia) Muhammad Rijal / Debby Susanto (final)
3. (Singapore) Danny Bawa Chrisnanta / Vanessa Neo Yu Yan (quarter-final)
4. (Indonesia) Fran Kurniawan / Shendy Puspa Irawati (second round)
5. (Indonesia) Irfan Fadhilah / Weni Anggraini (second round)
6. (South Korea) Kim Ki-jung / Jang Ye-na (first round)
7. (Indonesia) Riky Widianto / Richi Puspita Dili (quarter-final)
8. (South Korea) Kim Sa-rang / Eom Hye-won (semi-final)

=== Finals ===
Semifinals
1	(Indonesia) Tontowi Ahmad (Indonesia) Lilyana Natsir	21	21
(Indonesia) Markis Kido (Indonesia) Pia Zebadiah Bernadeth	19	19
8	(South Korea) Kim Sa-rang (South Korea) Eom Hye-won	12	12
2	(Indonesia) Muhammad Rijal (Indonesia) Debby Susanto	21	21

Final
1	(Indonesia) Tontowi Ahmad (Indonesia) Lilyana Natsir	21	21
2	(Indonesia) Muhammad Rijal (Indonesia) Debby Susanto	19	14

=== Top half ===
==== Section 1 ====
First Round
1	(Indonesia) T Ahmad (Indonesia) L Natsir	21	21
(Indonesia) T Wardhana (Indonesia) V Aprilsasi	19	13
(Indonesia) P Rhoma (Indonesia) A Budiharti	21	21
Q3	(Indonesia) B Hariyanto (Indonesia) M Giovani	10	15
6	(South Korea) Kim K-j (South Korea) Jang Y-n	16	17
(Indonesia) R Wijaya (Indonesia) D Permatasari	21	21
(Indonesia) E Subaktiar (Indonesia) M Oktavianti	21	21
Q4	(Indonesia) R Arief (Indonesia) A Cahyani	9	14

Second Round
1	(Indonesia) T Ahmad (Indonesia) L Natsir	21	21
(Indonesia) P Rhoma (Indonesia) A Budiharti	8	15
(Indonesia) R Wijaya (Indonesia) D Permatasari	21	15	21
(Indonesia) E Subaktiar (Indonesia) M Oktavianti	12	21	17

Quarterfinals
1	(Indonesia) T Ahmad (Indonesia) L Natsir	21	21
(Indonesia) R Wijaya (Indonesia) D Permatasari	10	16

==== Section 2 ====
First Round
4	(Indonesia) F Kurniawan (Indonesia) S Irawati	21	21
PFQ	(China) Liu YC (China) Chen QC	15	11
Q2	(China) Li JH (China) Huang DP	11	14
(Indonesia) M Kido (Indonesia) P Z Bernadeth	21	21
7	(Indonesia) R Widianto (Indonesia) R Dili	21	21
(Malaysia) F Tazari (Indonesia) K Hanadia	16	14
(Singapore) T Yeo (Singapore) D Yuliana	16	21	21
(Indonesia) A Putra (Indonesia) L Nurlita	21	17	16

Second Round
4	(Indonesia) F Kurniawan (Indonesia) S Irawati	21	17	16
(Indonesia) M Kido (Indonesia) P Z Bernadeth	17	21	21
7	(Indonesia) R Widianto (Indonesia) R Dili	21	21
(Singapore) T Yeo (Singapore) D Yuliana	10	10

Quarterfinals
(Indonesia) M Kido (Indonesia) P Z Bernadeth	24	22
7	(Indonesia) R Widianto (Indonesia) R Dili	22	20

=== Bottom half ===
==== Section 3 ====
First Round
(Singapore) Liu Y (Singapore) Thng TT	21	15	21
(Indonesia) A Pratama (Indonesia) R Pradipta	10	21	13
(Indonesia) R Nugraha (Indonesia) S Wulan Sari	17	18
8	(South Korea) Kim S-r (South Korea) Eom H-w	21	21
(Indonesia) H Faisal (Indonesia) D Fitriani	21	21
Q1	(Indonesia) R Ismail (Indonesia) A Ratnasari	13	12
(Indonesia) T Kusharyanto (Indonesia) V Marissa	16	19
3	(Singapore) D Chrisnanta (Singapore) V Neo	21	21

Second Round
(Singapore) Liu Y (Singapore) Thng TT	14	21
8	(South Korea) Kim S-r (South Korea) Eom H-w	21	23
(Indonesia) H Faisal (Indonesia) D Fitriani	12	14
3	(Singapore) D Chrisnanta (Singapore) V Neo	21	21

Quarterfinals
8	(South Korea) Kim S-r (South Korea) Eom H-w	21	19	21
3	(Singapore) D Chrisnanta (Singapore) V Neo	17	21	18

==== Section 4 ====
First Round
(South Korea) Lee S-j (South Korea) Kim S-y	15	21	18
(Indonesia) A Prasetya (Indonesia) G Widjaja	21	12	21
(Malaysia) Ong JG (Malaysia) Lim YL	16	21	15
5	(Indonesia) I Fadhilah (Indonesia) W Anggraini	21	15	21
(Malaysia) Tan WK (Malaysia) V Hoo	15	23	14
(Indonesia) L Nugroho (Indonesia) A Saufika	21	21	21
(Malaysia) Wong FY (Malaysia) Lai SJ	19	5
2	(Indonesia) M Rijal (Indonesia) D Susanto	21	21

Second Round
(Indonesia) A Prasetya (Indonesia) G Widjaja	22	25
5	(Indonesia) I Fadhilah (Indonesia) W Anggraini	20	23
(Indonesia) L Nugroho (Indonesia) A Saufika	18	14
2	(Indonesia) M Rijal (Indonesia) D Susanto	21	21

Quarterfinals
(Indonesia) A Prasetya (Indonesia) G Widjaja	14	21	9
2	(Indonesia) M Rijal (Indonesia) D Susanto	21	19	21

Preceded by 2012 Vietnam Open Grand Prix	BWF Grand Prix Gold and Grand Prix; 2012 season	Succeeded by 2012 Chinese Taipei Open Grand Prix Gold
