= Tan Aik Quan =

Malaysian badminton player (born 1990)

Tan Aik Quan 陈裖荃
Personal information
- Born: 27 October 1990 (age 36) Sungai Petani, Kedah, Malaysia

Sport
- Country: Malaysia
- Sport: Badminton
- Handedness: Left

Mixed doubles
- Highest ranking: 15 (13 June 2013)
- BWF profile
Medal record
Men's badminton
Representing Malaysia
SEA Games
Bronze medal – third place	2013 Naypyidaw	Mixed doubles
Bronze medal – third place	2015 Singapore	Men's team
Asian Junior Championships
Bronze medal – third place	2008 Kuala Lumpur	Mixed team

Tan Aik Quan (born 27 October 1990) is a Malaysian badminton player who competes in the doubles category. He reached a career high as world number 15 in the mixed doubles partnered with Lai Pei Jing.

== Achievements ==
=== SEA Games ===
Mixed doubles
Year	Venue	Partner	Opponent	Score	Result
2013	Wunna Theikdi Indoor Stadium; Naypyidaw, Myanmar	(Malaysia) Lai Pei Jing	(Thailand) Maneepong Jongjit (Thailand) Sapsiree Taerattanachai	15–21, 17–21	Bronze

=== BWF Grand Prix ===
The BWF Grand Prix had two levels, the Grand Prix and Grand Prix Gold. It was a series of badminton tournaments sanctioned by the Badminton World Federation (BWF) and played between 2007 and 2017.

Mixed doubles
Year	Tournament	Partner	Opponent	Score	Result
2012	Vietnam Open	(Malaysia) Lai Pei Jing	(Indonesia) Markis Kido (Indonesia) Pia Zebadiah Bernadet	21–23, 8–21	(silver) Runner-up
2013	Malaysia Grand Prix Gold	(Malaysia) Lai Pei Jing	(Indonesia) Praveen Jordan (Indonesia) Vita Marissa	22–20, 13–21, 17–21	(silver) Runner-up

BWF Grand Prix Gold tournament
BWF Grand Prix tournament

=== BWF International Challenge/Series ===
Mixed doubles
Year	Tournament	Partner	Opponent	Score	Result
2011	Smiling Fish International	(Malaysia) Lai Pei Jing	(Indonesia) Andhika Anhar (Indonesia) Keshya Nurvita Hanadia	19–21, 22–20, 21–11	(gold) Winner
2011	Malaysia International	(Malaysia) Lai Pei Jing	(Indonesia) Andhika Anhar (Indonesia) Keshya Nurvita Hanadia	21–18, 21–17	(gold) Winner

BWF International Challenge tournament
BWF International Series tournament
