= Badminton at the 2013 SEA Games – Mixed doubles =

These are the results of the mixed doubles competition in badminton at the 2013 SEA Games in Myanmar.

== Medal winners ==
(gold) Gold	(silver) Silver	(bronze) Bronze
(Indonesia) Muhammad Rijal (Indonesia) Debby Susanto	(Thailand) Maneepong Jongjit (Thailand) Sapsiree Taerattanachai	(Thailand) Nipitphon Phuangphuapet (Thailand) Puttita Supajirakul (Malaysia) Tan Aik Quan (Malaysia) Lai Pei Jing

== Draw ==
First round
1	(Indonesia) Muhammad Rijal (Indonesia) Debby Susanto
Bye
(Malaysia) Ong Jian Guo (Malaysia) Lim Yin Loo	21	21
(Laos) Phakornkham Fongmalayseng (Laos) Bouphakesone Lomany	17	16
(Thailand) Nipitphon Phuangphuapet (Thailand) Puttita Supajirakul	23	21
(Vietnam) Dương Bảo Đức (Vietnam) Thái Thị Hồng Gấm	21	14
(Cambodia) Sopheaktra Leng (Cambodia) Pechhoravy Ker	21	12	21
(Myanmar) Naing Phone Pyae (Myanmar) Khin Gone Yi Linn	13	21	15
(Vietnam) Đào Mạnh Thắng (Vietnam) Phạm Như Thảo	16	21	21
(Laos) Bounphasone Doungvilay (Laos) Phonephan Vatthanavong	21	11	15
(Myanmar) Than Lwin Aung (Myanmar) Phu Pwint Zan	12	18
(Malaysia) Tan Aik Quan (Malaysia) Lai Pei Jing	21	21
(Thailand) Maneepong Jongjit (Thailand) Sapsiree Taerattanachai	21	21
(Singapore) Danny Bawa Chrisnanta (Singapore) Vanessa Neo	14	10
Bye
2	(Indonesia) Riky Widianto (Indonesia) Richi Puspita Dili

Quarterfinals
1	(Indonesia) Muhammad Rijal (Indonesia) Debby Susanto	17	21	21
(Malaysia) Ong Jian Guo (Malaysia) Lim Yin Loo	21	10	11
(Thailand) Nipitphon Phuangphuapet (Thailand) Puttita Supajirakul	21	21
(Cambodia) Sopheaktra Leng (Cambodia) Pechhoravy Ker	14	4
(Vietnam) Đào Mạnh Thắng (Vietnam) Phạm Như Thảo	14	16
(Malaysia) Tan Aik Quan (Malaysia) Lai Pei Jing	21	21
(Thailand) Maneepong Jongjit (Thailand) Sapsiree Taerattanachai	19	24	21
2	(Indonesia) Riky Widianto (Indonesia) Richi Puspita Dili	21	22	17

Semifinals
1	(Indonesia) Muhammad Rijal (Indonesia) Debby Susanto	21	18	21
(Thailand) Nipitphon Phuangphuapet (Thailand) Puttita Supajirakul	11	21	19
(Malaysia) Tan Aik Quan (Malaysia) Lai Pei Jing	15	17
(Thailand) Maneepong Jongjit (Thailand) Sapsiree Taerattanachai	21	21

Finals
1	(Indonesia) Muhammad Rijal (Indonesia) Debby Susanto	21	21
(Thailand) Maneepong Jongjit (Thailand) Sapsiree Taerattanachai	18	19
