= Yeni Asmarani =

Indonesian badminton player (born 1992)

Personal information
- Born: 20 March 1992 (age 34) Bandung, West Java, Indonesia
- Height: 1.63 m (5 ft 4 in)

Sport
- Country: Indonesia
- Sport: Badminton
- Handedness: Right

Women's singles
- Highest ranking: 48 (27 June 2013)
- BWF profile

Yeni Asmarani (born 20 March 1992) is an Indonesian badminton player from Djarum club.

== Achievements ==
=== BWF Grand Prix ===
The BWF Grand Prix had two levels, the Grand Prix and Grand Prix Gold. It was a series of badminton tournaments sanctioned by the Badminton World Federation (BWF) and played between 2007 and 2017.

Women's singles

Year	Tournament	Opponent	Score	Result
2012	Indonesia Grand Prix Gold	(China) Han Li	12–21, 10–21	(silver) Runner-up

BWF Grand Prix Gold tournament
BWF Grand Prix tournament
