= Muhammad Rijal =

Indonesian badminton player

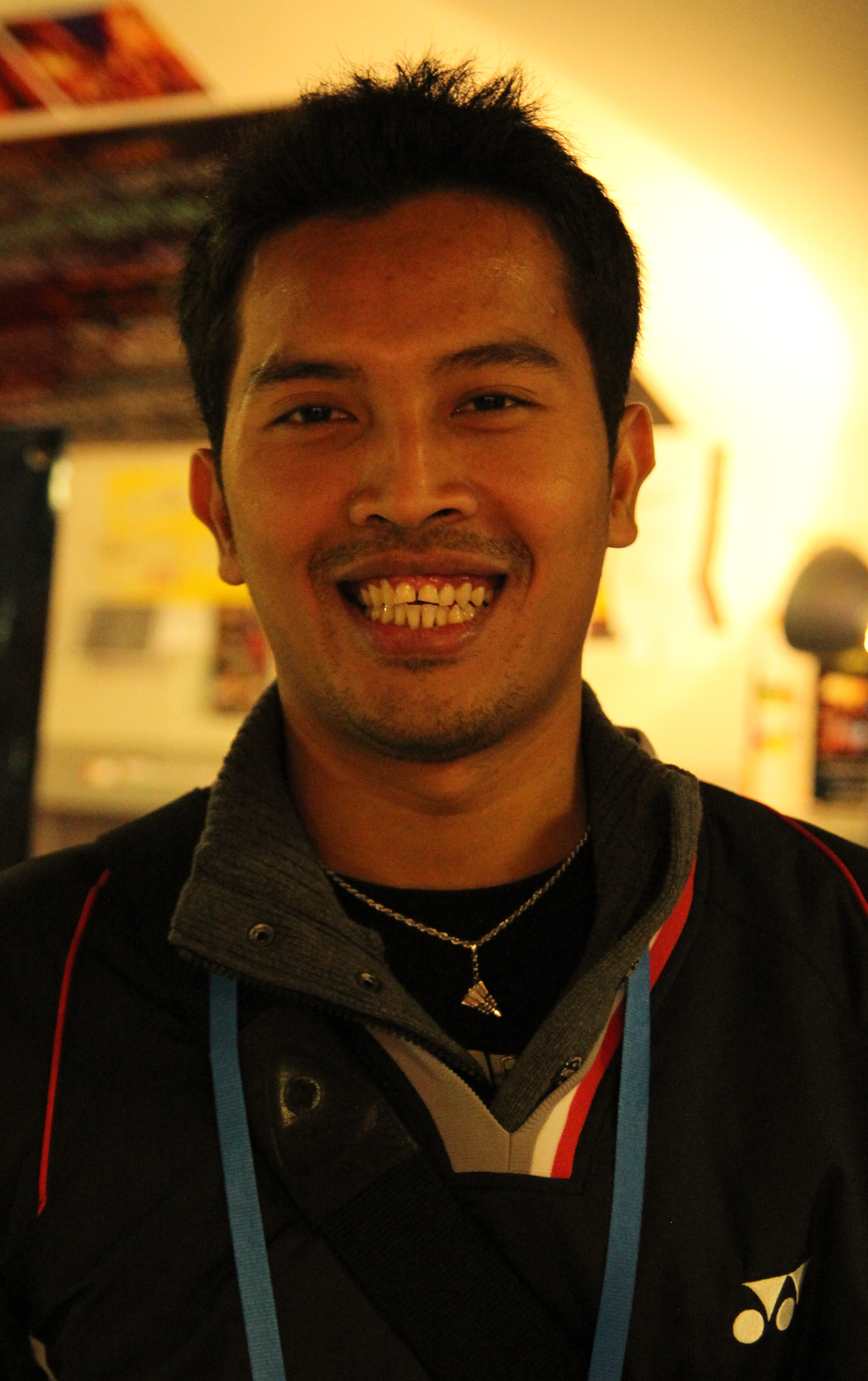

Personal information
- Born: May 25, 1986 (age 40) Tangerang, Indonesia
- Height: 1.77 m (5 ft 10 in)
- Weight: 68 kg (150 lb)

Sport
- Country: Indonesia
- Sport: Badminton
- Handedness: Right
- Coached by: Richard Mainaky

Mixed doubles
- Highest ranking: 6
- BWF profile
Medal record
Men's badminton
Representing Indonesia
Sudirman Cup
Silver medal – second place	2007 Glasgow	Mixed team
Asian Championships
Bronze medal – third place	2005 Hyderabad	Mixed doubles
SEA Games
Gold medal – first place	2011 Jakarta–Palembang	Men's team
Gold medal – first place	2013 Naypyidaw	Mixed doubles
Bronze medal – third place	2011 Jakarta–Palembang	Mixed doubles
World Junior Championships
Silver medal – second place	2004 Richmond	Mixed doubles
Bronze medal – third place	2004 Richmond	Mixed team

Muhammad Rijal (born 25 May 1986) is an Indonesian badminton player from PB Djarum club.

== Career ==
Rijal captured his first international badminton title in mixed doubles with partner Vita Marissa at the 2008 Japan Super Series, beating fellow Indonesians Nova Widianto/Lilyana Natsir in the final round.

== Personal life ==
When he was young, he joined the Djarum Kudus badminton club. His parents' names are Ibrahim Martin (father) and Imas Riyati (mother). His hobby is football. Generally people called him Rizal. His name usually spelled as Rijal instead of Rizal. His family is Sundanese, however because his first club was Djarum, he represented East Java in Indonesia National Sport Game. Now he is engaged in business in the sale of sports equipment and production of the shuttlecock.

== Participation at Indonesian Team ==
- 1 time at Sudirman Cup (2007)

== Achievements ==
=== Asian Championships ===
Mixed doubles
Year	Venue	Partner	Opponent	Score	Result
2005	Gachibowli Indoor Stadium; Hyderabad, India	(Indonesia) Endang Nursugianti	(South Korea) Lee Jae-jin (South Korea) Lee Hyo-jung	4–15, 8–15	Bronze

=== SEA Games ===
Mixed doubles
Year	Venue	Partner	Opponent	Score	Result
2011	Istora Senayan; Jakarta, Indonesia	(Indonesia) Debby Susanto	(Thailand) Sudket Prapakamol (Thailand) Saralee Thoungthongkam	11–21, 14–21	Bronze
2013	Wunna Theikdi Indoor Stadium; Naypyidaw, Myanmar	(Indonesia) Debby Susanto	(Thailand) Maneepong Jongjit (Thailand) Sapsiree Taerattanachai	21–18, 21–19	Gold

=== World Junior Championships ===
Mixed doubles
Year	Venue	Partner	Opponent	Score	Result
2004	Minoru Arena; Richmond, Canada	(Indonesia) Greysia Polii	(China) He Hanbin (China) Yu Yang	12–15, 12–15	Silver

=== BWF Superseries (1 title, 2 runners-up) ===
The BWF Superseries, which was launched on 14 December 2006 and implemented in 2007, is a series of elite badminton tournaments, sanctioned by the Badminton World Federation (BWF). BWF Superseries levels are Superseries and Superseries Premier. A season of Superseries consists of twelve tournaments around the world that have been introduced since 2011. Successful players are invited to the Superseries Finals, which are held at the end of each year.

Mixed doubles
Year	Tournament	Partner	Opponent	Score	Result
2007	Swiss Open	(Indonesia) Greysia Polii	(South Korea) Lee Yong-dae (South Korea) Lee Hyo-jung	21–14, 16–21, 18–21	(silver) Runner-up
2008	Japan Open	(Indonesia) Vita Marissa	(Indonesia) Nova Widianto (Indonesia) Liliyana Natsir	14–21, 21–15, 21–19	(gold) Winner
2012	Japan Open	(Indonesia) Liliyana Natsir	(Malaysia) Chan Peng Soon (Malaysia) Goh Liu Ying	12–21, 19–21	(silver) Runner-up

BWF Super Series Finals tournament
BWF Super Series Premier tournament
BWF Super Series tournament

=== BWF Grand Prix (3 titles, 5 runners-up) ===
The BWF Grand Prix had two levels, the BWF Grand Prix and Grand Prix Gold. It was a series of badminton tournaments sanctioned by the Badminton World Federation (BWF) which was held from 2007 to 2017.

Mixed doubles
Year	Tournament	Partner	Opponent	Score	Result
2011	India Grand Prix Gold	(Indonesia) Debby Susanto	(Thailand) Sudket Prapakamol (Thailand) Saralee Thungthongkam	21–16, 18–21, 11–21	(silver) Runner-up
2012	Indonesia Grand Prix Gold	(Indonesia) Debby Susanto	(Indonesia) Tontowi Ahmad (Indonesia) Liliyana Natsir	19–21, 14–21	(silver) Runner-up
2012	Chinese Taipei Open	(Indonesia) Debby Susanto	(Hong Kong) Lee Chun Hei (Hong Kong) Chau Hoi Wah	21–14, 21–14	(gold) Winner
2012	Macau Open	(Indonesia) Debby Susanto	(Indonesia) Tontowi Ahmad (Indonesia) Liliyana Natsir	16–21, 21–14, 16–21	(silver) Runner-up
2013	Dutch Open	(Indonesia) Debby Susanto	(Singapore) Danny Bawa Chrisnanta (Singapore) Vanessa Neo	19–21, 23–25	(silver) Runner-up
2014	U.S. Open	(Indonesia) Vita Marissa	(Thailand) Maneepong Jongjit (Thailand) Sapsiree Taerattanachai	21–16, 21–19	(gold) Winner
2014	Vietnam Open	(Indonesia) Vita Marissa	(Indonesia) Irfan Fadhilah (Indonesia) Weni Anggraini	21–18, 21–10	(gold) Winner
2014	Indonesian Masters	(Indonesia) Vita Marissa	(Indonesia) Riky Widianto (Indonesia) Richi Puspita Dili	18–21, 19–21	(silver) Runner-up

BWF Grand Prix Gold tournament
BWF Grand Prix tournament

=== BWF International Challenge/Series (1 title, 1 runner-up) ===
Mixed doubles
Year	Tournament	Partner	Opponent	Score	Result
2014	Osaka International	(Indonesia) Vita Marissa	(South Korea) Choi Sol-gyu (South Korea) Chae Yoo-jung	21–18, 17–21, 21–18	(gold) Winner
2014	Indonesia International	(Indonesia) Vita Marissa	(Indonesia) Ronald Alexander (Indonesia) Melati Daeva Oktavianti	11–7, 4–11, 6–11, 7–11	(silver) Runner-up

BWF International Challenge tournament
BWF International Series tournament

== Performance timeline ==
Key

W	Won	F	Finalist	SF	Semi-finalist
QF	Quarter-finalist	#R	Rounds 4, 3, 2, 1	RR	Round-robin stage
Q#	Qualification round	A	Absent	w/d	Withdrew
G	Gold	S	Silver	B	Bronze
NH	Not held	N/A	Not applicable	DNQ	Did not qualify

=== National team ===
- Senior level

Team event	2011
SEA Games	G

=== Individual competitions ===
- Junior level

Event	2004
'World Junior Championships	S

- Senior level

Event	2011	2013
SEA Games	B	G

Event	2011	2013
World Championships	1R	QF

Tournament	2007	2008	2009	2010	2011	2012	2013	2014	Best
BWF Superseries
Swiss Open	F	QF	A		N/A				F ('07)
Japan Open	A	W	A	1R	1R	F	2R	QF	W ('08)
BWF Superseries Finals	NH	DNQ				RR	DNQ		RR ('12)

Tournament	2009	2010	2011	2012	2013	2014	Best
BWF Grand Prix and Grand Prix Gold
Syed Modi International	A		F	w/d	NH	A	F ('11)
Swiss Open	N/A		A	2R	QF	2R	F ('07)
U.S. Open	A					W	W ('14)
Chinese Taipei Open		2R	QF	W	2R	A	W ('12)
Vietnam Open	2R	A				W	W ('14)
Dutch Open	A				F	2R	F ('13)
Macau Open	A	QF	SF	F	A		F ('12)
Indonesian Masters	NH	QF	1R	F	2R	F	F ('12, '14)
