= Han Li =

Chinese badminton player

Han Li 韩利
Personal information
- Born: 16 January 1988 (age 38) Tai'an, Shandong, China
- Height: 1.73 m (5 ft 8 in)
- Weight: 59 kg (130 lb)

Sport
- Country: China
- Sport: Badminton
- Handedness: Right

Women's singles
- Highest ranking: 11 (28 August 2014)
- BWF profile
Medal record
Women's badminton
Representing China
East Asian Games
Gold medal – first place	2013 Tianjin	Women's singles
Gold medal – first place	2013 Tianjin	Women's team
World Junior Championships
Silver medal – second place	2006 Incheon	Mixed team
Asian Junior Championships
Bronze medal – third place	2006 Kuala Lumpur	Girls' singles
Bronze medal – third place	2006 Kuala Lumpur	Mixed team

Han Li (Chinese: 韩利, born 16 January 1988) is a Chinese badminton player from Tai'an, Shandong. In 2003, she was elected to join the Chinese national youth team, and two years later she joined the national senior team. In 2006, she won the gold medal at the World Junior Championships in the mixed team event. In 2012, she won two Grand Prix Gold title at the Australia Open and Indonesian Masters tournament. In 2013, she won the women's singles gold medal at the East Asian Games in Tianjin.

== Achievements ==
=== East Asian Games ===
Women's singles
Year	Venue	Opponent	Score	Result
2013	Binhai New Area Dagang Gymnasium, Tianjin, China	(China) Wang Shixian	14–21, 21–17, 22–20	Gold

=== Asian Junior Championships ===
Girls' singles
Year	Venue	Opponent	Score	Result
2006	Kuala Lumpur Badminton Stadium, Kuala Lumpur, Malaysia	(Malaysia) Lydia Cheah	21–19, 15–21, 11–21	Bronze

=== BWF Grand Prix ===
The BWF Grand Prix has two levels, the BWF Grand Prix and Grand Prix Gold. It is a series of badminton tournaments sanctioned by the Badminton World Federation (BWF) since 2007.

Women's singles
Year	Tournament	Opponent	Score	Result
2011	Macau Open	(China) Wang Shixian	14–21, 14–21	(silver) Runner-up
2011	Korea Grand Prix Gold	(South Korea) Sung Ji-hyun	18–21, 16–21	(silver) Runner-up
2012	Australian Open	(South Korea) Bae Yeon-ju	21–13, 21–14	(gold) Winner
2012	Indonesia Grand Prix Gold	(Indonesia) Yeni Asmarani	21–12, 21–10	(gold) Winner

BWF Grand Prix Gold tournament
BWF Grand Prix tournament
