= Debby Susanto =

Indonesian badminton player (born 1989)

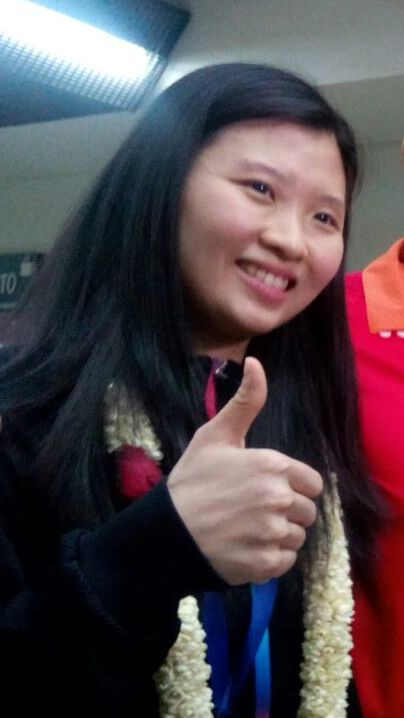
- Susanto at the welcoming ceremony in Jakarta after winning 2016 All England Open

Personal information
- Born: 3 May 1989 (age 37) Palembang, South Sumatra, Indonesia
- Years active: 2006–2019
- Height: 1.61 m (5 ft 3 in)
- Weight: 53 kg (117 lb)

Sport
- Country: Indonesia
- Sport: Badminton
- Handedness: Right
- Coached by: Richard Mainaky
- Retired: 24 February 2019

Mixed doubles
- Highest ranking: 2 (with Praveen Jordan 2 November 2016)
- BWF profile
Medal record
Women's badminton
Representing Indonesia
Sudirman Cup
Bronze medal – third place	2011 Qingdao	Mixed team
Bronze medal – third place	2015 Dongguan	Mixed team
Asian Games
Bronze medal – third place	2014 Incheon	Mixed doubles
Bronze medal – third place	2018 Jakarta–Palembang	Women's team
SEA Games
Gold medal – first place	2013 Naypyidaw	Mixed doubles
Gold medal – first place	2015 Singapore	Mixed doubles
Silver medal – second place	2011 Jakarta–Palembang	Women's team
Bronze medal – third place	2011 Jakarta–Palembang	Mixed doubles
Bronze medal – third place	2015 Singapore	Women's team
World Senior Championships
Gold medal – first place	2025 Pattaya	Mixed doubles 35+
Bronze medal – third place	2025 Pattaya	Women's doubles 35+
World Junior Championships
Bronze medal – third place	2007 Waitakere City	Mixed doubles
Asian Junior Championships
Gold medal – first place	2007 Kuala Lumpur	Girls' doubles
Bronze medal – third place	2007 Kuala Lumpur	Mixed team

Debby Susanto (born 3 May 1989) is an Indonesian former badminton player who specializes in doubles. She joined PB Djarum, a badminton club in Kudus, Central Java from 2006 until her retirement. Susanto known as Muhammad Rijal's longtime partner in the mixed doubles. The partnership ended in the end of the 2013 shortly after they won gold medal in 2013 SEA Games in Myanmar due to Rijal's resignation from national team.

Since the beginning of 2014, she is pairing fellow Indonesian Praveen Jordan who was called up to the national team. The duo won the oldest badminton tournament All England Open in 2016, and also the gold medal at the 2015 SEA Games.

== Awards and nominations ==
Award	Year	Category	Result	Ref.
Indonesian Sport Awards	2018	Favorite Women's Team Athlete with 2018 Asian Games women's badminton team	Won	

== Achievements ==
=== World Senior Championships ===
Women's doubles
Year	Age	Venue	Partner	Opponent	Score	Result	Ref.
2025	35+	Eastern National Sports Training Centre; Pattaya, Thailand	(Scotland) Jody Barral	(Chinese Taipei) Cheng Yu-jou (Chinese Taipei) Lee Tai-an	14–21, 19–21	Bronze	

Mixed doubles
Year	Age	Venue	Partner	Opponent	Score	Result	Ref.
2025	35+	Eastern National Sports Training Centre; Pattaya, Thailand	(Indonesia) Hendra Setiawan	(Thailand) Nawut Thanateeratam (Thailand) Peeraya Munkitamorn	21–5, 21–9	Gold	

=== Asian Games ===
Mixed doubles
Year	Venue	Partner	Opponent	Score	Result
2014	Gyeyang Gymnasium; Incheon, South Korea	(Indonesia) Praveen Jordan	(China) Zhang Nan (China) Zhao Yunlei	19–21, 17–21	Bronze

=== SEA Games ===
Mixed doubles
Year	Venue	Partner	Opponent	Score	Result
2011	Istora Senayan; Jakarta, Indonesia	(Indonesia) Muhammad Rijal	(Thailand) Sudket Prapakamol (Thailand) Saralee Thungthongkam	11–21, 14–21	Bronze
2013	Wunna Theikdi Indoor Stadium; Naypyidaw, Myanmar	(Indonesia) Muhammad Rijal	(Thailand) Maneepong Jongjit (Thailand) Sapsiree Taerattanachai	21–18, 21–19	Gold
2015	Singapore Indoor Stadium; Singapore	(Indonesia) Praveen Jordan	(Malaysia) Chan Peng Soon (Malaysia) Goh Liu Ying	18–21, 21–13, 25–23	Gold

=== World Junior Championships ===
Mixed doubles
Year	Venue	Partner	Opponent	Score	Result
2007	Waitakere Trusts Stadium; Waitakere City, New Zealand	(Indonesia) Afiat Yuris Wirawan	(Malaysia) Lim Khim Wah (Malaysia) Ng Hui Lin	16–21, 8–21	Bronze

=== Asian Junior Championships ===
Girls' doubles
Year	Venue	Partner	Opponent	Score	Result
2007	Stadium Juara; Kuala Lumpur, Malaysia	(Indonesia) Richi Puspita Dili	(Malaysia) Lydia Cheah Li Ya (Malaysia) Tee Jing Yi	21–12, 15–21, 21–18	Gold

=== BWF Superseries (2 titles, 3 runners-up) ===
The BWF Superseries, which was launched on 14 December 2006 and implemented in 2007, was a series of elite badminton tournaments, sanctioned by the Badminton World Federation (BWF). BWF Superseries levels were Superseries and Superseries Premier. A season of Superseries consisted of twelve tournaments around the world that had been introduced since 2011. Successful players were invited to the Superseries Finals, which were held at the end of each year.

Mixed doubles
Year	Tournament	Partner	Opponent	Score	Result
2015	French Open	(Indonesia) Praveen Jordan	(South Korea) Ko Sung-hyun (South Korea) Kim Ha-na	10–21, 21–15, 19–21	(silver) Runner-up
2016	All England Open	(Indonesia) Praveen Jordan	(Denmark) Joachim Fischer Nielsen (Denmark) Christinna Pedersen	21–12, 21–17	(gold) Winner
2016	Hong Kong Open	(Indonesia) Praveen Jordan	(Indonesia) Tontowi Ahmad (Indonesia) Liliyana Natsir	19–21, 17–21	(silver) Runner-up
2017	Australia Open	(Indonesia) Praveen Jordan	(China) Zheng Siwei (China) Chen Qingchen	21–18, 14–21, 17–21	(silver) Runner-up
2017	Korea Open	(Indonesia) Praveen Jordan	(China) Wang Yilyu (China) Huang Dongping	21–17, 21–18	(gold) Winner

BWF Super Series Finals tournament
BWF Super Series Premier tournament
BWF Super Series tournament

=== BWF Grand Prix (2 titles, 9 runners-up) ===
The BWF Grand Prix had two levels, the Grand Prix and Grand Prix Gold. It was a series of badminton tournaments sanctioned by the Badminton World Federation (BWF) and played between 2007 and 2017.

Mixed doubles
Year	Tournament	Partner	Opponent	Score	Result
2011	India Grand Prix Gold	(Indonesia) Muhammad Rijal	(Thailand) Sudket Prapakamol (Thailand) Saralee Thungthongkam	16–21, 21–18, 21–11	(silver) Runner-up
2012	Indonesia Grand Prix Gold	(Indonesia) Muhammad Rijal	(Indonesia) Tontowi Ahmad (Indonesia) Liliyana Natsir	19–21, 14–21	(silver) Runner-up
2012	Chinese Taipei Open	(Indonesia) Muhammad Rijal	(Hong Kong) Lee Chun Hei (Hong Kong) Chau Hoi Wah	21–14, 21–14	(gold) Winner
2012	Macau Open	(Indonesia) Muhammad Rijal	(Indonesia) Tontowi Ahmad (Indonesia) Liliyana Natsir	16–21, 21–14, 16–21	(silver) Runner-up
2013	Dutch Open	(Indonesia) Muhammad Rijal	(Singapore) Danny Bawa Chrisnanta (Singapore) Vanessa Neo	19–21, 23–25	(silver) Runner-up
2014	Malaysia Grand Prix Gold	(Indonesia) Praveen Jordan	(China) Lu Kai (China) Huang Yaqiong	14–21, 13–21	(silver) Runner-up
2015	Malaysia Masters	(Indonesia) Praveen Jordan	(Denmark) Joachim Fischer Nielsen (Denmark) Christinna Pedersen	18–21, 18–21	(silver) Runner-up
2015	Thailand Open	(Indonesia) Praveen Jordan	(South Korea) Choi Sol-gyu (South Korea) Eom Hye-won	19–21, 21–17, 16–21	(silver) Runner-up
2015	Indonesian Masters	(Indonesia) Praveen Jordan	(Indonesia) Tontowi Ahmad (Indonesia) Liliyana Natsir	18–21,13–21	(silver) Runner-up
2016	Syed Modi International	(Indonesia) Praveen Jordan	(Thailand) Dechapol Puavaranukroh (Thailand) Sapsiree Taerattanachai	23–25, 21–9, 21–16	(gold) Winner
2017	Swiss Open	(Indonesia) Praveen Jordan	(Thailand) Dechapol Puavaranukroh (Thailand) Sapsiree Taerattanachai	18–21,15–21	(silver) Runner-up

BWF Grand Prix Gold tournament
BWF Grand Prix tournament

=== BWF International Challenge/Series (1 title) ===
Women's doubles
Year	Tournament	Partner	Opponent	Score	Result
2009	Vietnam International	(Indonesia) Pia Zebadiah Bernadet	(Japan) Yuki Itagaki (Japan) Yui Miyauchi	21–17, 17–21, 21–15	(gold) Winner

BWF International Challenge tournament
BWF Future Series tournament

=== BWF Junior International (1 runner-up) ===
Mixed doubles
Year	Tournament	Partner	Opponent	Score	Result	Ref.
2007	Dutch Junior	(Indonesia) Wifqi Windarto	(Indonesia) Indra Viki Okvana (Indonesia) Richi Puspita Dili	14–21, 18–21	(silver) Runner-up	

BWF Junior International Grand Prix tournament
BWF Junior International Challenge tournament
BWF Junior International Series tournament
BWF Junior Future Series tournament

== Performance timeline ==
=== National team ===
- Junior level

Team event	2007
Asian Junior Championships	Bronze

- Senior level

Team event	2011	2015
SEA Games	Silver	Bronze

Team event	2018
Asian Games	Bronze

Team event	2015
Sudirman Cup	Bronze

=== Individual competitions ===
- Junior level

Event	2007
Asian Junior Championships	Gold (GD)

Event	2007
World Junior Championships	Bronze (XD)

- Senior level

Event	2011	2013	2015
SEA Games	Bronze	Gold	Gold

Event	2018
Asian Championships	QF

Event	2014
Asian Games	Bronze

Events	2025	Ref
World Senior Championships	G	

Event	2011	2013	2014	2015	2017
World Championships	R1	QF	QF	QF	QF

Event	2016
Olympic Games	QF

Tournament	BWF World Tour		Best
Tournament	2018	2019	Best
Malaysia Masters	R1	R2	F (2014, 2015)
Indonesia Masters	R2	R1	F (2012, 2015)
India Open	R2	Ret	SF (2010, 2011, 2015)
All England Open	QF	Ret	W (2016)
New Zealand Open	R2	Ret	R2 (2018)
Australian Open	R2	Ret	F (2017)
Indonesia Open	QF	Ret	QF (2010, 2013, 2018)
Thailand Open	R2	Ret	F (2015)
Japan Open	R1	Ret	SF (2017)
China Open	QF	Ret	QF (2015, 2016, 2018)
Denmark Open	R2	Ret	QF (2011, 2012, 2016)
French Open	R1	Ret	F (2015)
China Masters	R2	Ret	QF (2014)
Year-end ranking	18	Ret	2
Tournament	2018	2019	Best

Tournament	BWF Superseries									Best
Tournament	2009	2010	2011	2012	2013	2014	2015	2016	2017	Best
All England Open	A		R1	R2	SF	A	SF	W	R1	W (2016)
Swiss Open	A		GPG							F (2017)
India Open	GPG		SF	R1	w/d	QF	SF	w/d	A	SF (2010, 2011, 2015)
Malaysia Open	A	R1	R2	R2	R2	QF	R1	R2	R2	QF (2014)
Singapore Open	A		R2	R1	QF	A	R1	QF	QF	QF (2013, 2016, 2017)
Indonesia Open	R1 (WD); R1 (XD)	QF	R2	R1	QF	R2	R2	R1	R1	QF (2010, 2013)
Australian Open	GPG					A	R2	SF	F	F (2017)
China Masters	A	R1	A			GPG				QF (2014)
Korea Open	A		R2	R1	R2	A	R2	A	W	W (2017)
Japan Open	A	R1	R1	A	R2	R2	R2	w/d	SF	SF (2017)
Denmark Open	A		QF	QF	R1	R2	R2	QF	A	QF (2011, 2012, 2016)
French Open	A		R1	R2	A	R1	F	QF	R2	F (2015)
China Open	A		R1	A	R1	R2	QF	QF	R1	QF (2015, 2016)
Hong Kong Open	A	R2	A	R2	A	QF	QF	F	R1	F (2016)
BWF Superseries Finals	DNQ			GS	DNQ		SF	SF	GS	SF (2015, 2016)
Year-end ranking	61 (WD); 47 (XD)	127 (WD); 20 (XD)	15	7	11	12	8	5	7	2
Tournament	2009	2010	2011	2012	2013	2014	2015	2016	2017	Best

Tournament	BWF Grand Prix and Grand Prix Gold									Best
Tournament	2009	2010	2011	2012	2013	2014	2015	2016	2017	Best
India Open	QF	SF	SS							SF (2010)
Malaysia Masters	w/d	A	w/d	A		F	F	R1	A	F (2014, 2015)
Syed Modi International	A		F	w/d	—N/a	A		W	A	W (2016)
Swiss Open	SS		A	R2	QF	QF	QF	w/d	F	F (2017)
Australian Open	A			R2	A	SS				R2 (2012)
China Masters	SS					QF	A			QF (2014)
Chinese Taipei Open	A	R2	QF	W	R2	A	SF	A		W (2012)
Thailand Open	A	—N/a	A			—N/a	F	A		F (2015)
Dutch Open	A				F	A				F (2013)
Macau Open	A	QF	SF	F	A	w/d	A			F (2012)
Indonesian Masters	—N/a	QF	R1	F	R2	A	F	w/d	—N/a	F (2012, 2015)
Tournament	2009	2010	2011	2012	2013	2014	2015	2016	2017	Best

== Record against selected opponents ==
Mixed doubles results against World Superseries finalists, World Superseries Finals finalists, World Championships semifinalists, and Olympic quarterfinalists paired with:

=== Praveen Jordan ===
- (China) Liu Cheng & Bao Yixin 3–2
- (China) Lu Kai & Huang Yaqiong 2–2
- (China) Xu Chen & Ma Jin 2–2
- (China) Zhang Nan & Li Yinhui 1–0
- (China) Zhang Nan & Zhao Yunlei 1–8
- (China) Zheng Siwei & Chen Qingchen 0–6
- (Denmark) Joachim Fischer Nielsen & Christinna Pedersen 6–6
- (England) Chris Adcock & Gabby Adcock 0–5
- (Hong Kong) Lee Chun Hei & Chau Hoi Wah 5–4
- (Indonesia) Riky Widianto & Richi Puspita Dili 2–0
- (Indonesia) Tontowi Ahmad & Liliyana Natsir 1–4
- (Japan) Kenta Kazuno & Ayane Kurihara 2–0
- (South Korea) Ko Sung-hyun & Kim Ha-na 4–4
- (South Korea) Yoo Yeon-seong & Chang Ye-na 1–0
- (Malaysia) Chan Peng Soon & Goh Liu Ying 1–1
- (Poland) Robert Mateusiak & Nadieżda Zięba 0–1

=== Muhammad Rijal ===
- (China) Qiu Zihan & Bao Yixin 0–1
- (China) Tao Jiaming & Tian Qing 0–2
- (China) Xu Chen & Ma Jin 1–2
- (China) Zhang Nan & Zhao Yunlei 0–7
- (Chinese Taipei) Chen Hung-ling & Cheng Wen-hsing 1–2
- (Denmark) Joachim Fischer Nielsen & Christinna Pedersen 1–2
- (Denmark) Thomas Laybourn & Kamilla Rytter Juhl 0–1
- (England) Nathan Robertson & Jenny Wallwork 1–1
- (Germany) Michael Fuchs & Birgit Michels 2–1
- (Hong Kong) Lee Chun Hei & Chau Hoi Wah 1–0
- (Indonesia) Fran Kurniawan & Pia Zebadiah Bernadet 0–2
- (Indonesia) Hendra Aprida Gunawan & Vita Marissa 0–1
- (Indonesia) Hendra Setiawan & (Russia) Anastasia Russkikh 0–1
- (Indonesia) Riky Widianto & Richi Puspita Dili 2–0
- (Indonesia) Tontowi Ahmad & Liliyana Natsir 0–3
- (South Korea) Ko Sung-hyun & Eom Hye-won 0–1
- (South Korea) Ko Sung-hyun & Ha Jung-eun 0–1
- (South Korea) Lee Yong-dae & Lee Hyo-jung 0–1
- (South Korea) Shin Baek-cheol & Eom Hye-won 0–1
- (South Korea) Yoo Yeon-seong & Chang Ye-na 0–2
- (Malaysia) Chan Peng Soon & Goh Liu Ying 3–2
- (Poland) Robert Mateusiak & Nadieżda Zięba 0–1
- (Thailand) Songphon Anugritayawon & Kunchala Voravichitchaikul 3–0
- (Thailand) Sudket Prapakamol & Saralee Thungthongkam 0–2
