= Lai Pei Jing =

Malaysian badminton player (born 1992)

Lai Pei Jing 赖沛君
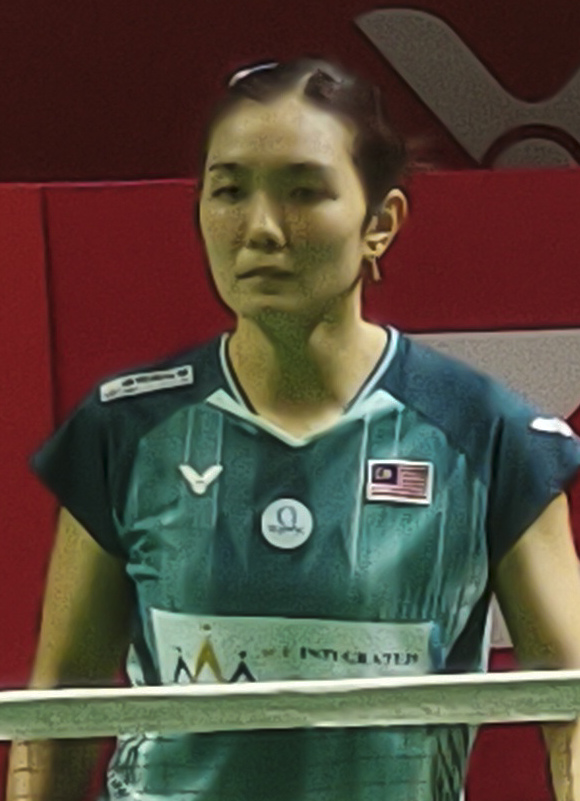
- Lai at the 2026 Indonesia Open

Personal information
- Born: 8 August 1992 (age 34) Kuantan, Pahang, Malaysia
- Height: 1.60 m (5 ft 3 in)

Sport
- Country: Malaysia
- Sport: Badminton
- Handedness: Right

Mixed doubles
- Highest ranking: 5 (with Tan Kian Meng, 20 December 2022); 23 (with Jimmy Wong, 10 March 2026)
- Current ranking: 14 (with Hoo Pang Ron, 10 November 2026)
- BWF profile
Medal record
Women's badminton
Representing Malaysia
Sudirman Cup
Bronze medal – third place	2023 Suzhou	Mixed team
Commonwealth Games
Gold medal – first place	2014 Glasgow	Mixed team
Gold medal – first place	2022 Birmingham	Mixed team
Bronze medal – third place	2022 Birmingham	Mixed doubles
SEA Games
Silver medal – second place	2015 Singapore	Women's team
Bronze medal – third place	2011 Jakarta–Palembang	Women's team
Bronze medal – third place	2013 Naypyidaw	Mixed doubles
Bronze medal – third place	2019 Philippines	Women's team
Bronze medal – third place	2019 Philippines	Mixed doubles
World Junior Championships
Silver medal – second place	2009 Alor Setar	Mixed team
Bronze medal – third place	2008 Pune	Mixed team
Bronze medal – third place	2010 Guadalajara	Mixed doubles
Bronze medal – third place	2010 Guadalajara	Mixed team
Asian Junior Championships
Gold medal – first place	2009 Kuala Lumpur	Mixed team
Silver medal – second place	2010 Kuala Lumpur	Mixed doubles
Silver medal – second place	2010 Kuala Lumpur	Mixed team
Bronze medal – third place	2009 Kuala Lumpur	Girls' doubles

Lai Pei Jing
- Traditional Chinese: 賴沛君
- Simplified Chinese: 赖沛君
Transcriptions
Standard Mandarin
- Hanyu Pinyin: Lài Pèijūn
Southern Min
- Hokkien POJ: Lōa Phài-kun

Lai Pei Jing (simplified Chinese: 赖沛君; traditional Chinese: 賴沛君; pinyin: Lài Pèijūn, born 8 August 1992) is a Malaysian badminton player who specialises in mixed doubles and women's doubles. A two-time Commonwealth Games gold medalist, one-time bronze medalist and Sudirman Cup bronze medalist, she was part of the Malaysian mixed teams that won gold medals at the 2014 and 2022 Commonwealth Games. She also won a bronze medal in mixed doubles at the 2022 Commonwealth Games with Tan Kian Meng and contributed to Malaysia's bronze medal at the 2023 Sudirman Cup. Together with Tan, she achieved a career-high mixed doubles world ranking of number five on 20 December 2022.

Lai won the mixed doubles title at the 2022 Korea Open, a BWF World Tour Super 500 tournament, with Tan Kian Meng, defeating South Korea's Ko Sung-hyun and Eom Hye-won in the final. Together, they also won the 2016 Vietnam Open, 2016 Thailand Open and 2017 Malaysia Masters, and finished runners-up at the 2019 Singapore Open. At the SEA Games, Lai won bronze medals in mixed doubles at the 2013 and 2019 SEA Games, alongside Tan Aik Quan and Tan Kian Meng respectively. She was also part of Malaysia's women's team that won silver in 2015 and bronze medals in 2011 and 2019.

In women's doubles, Lai partnered Lim Chiew Sien to reach the final of the 2024 Australian Open, a Super 500 tournament, where they finished runners-up to Indonesia's Febriana Dwipuji Kusuma and Amallia Cahaya Pratiwi. After Tan Kian Meng retired in 2025, Lai partnered Jimmy Wong and finished runners-up at several international tournaments, including the 2025 Macau Open and 2025 Korea Masters. In 2026, she formed a new partnership with Hoo Pang Ron and reached the final of the 2026 China Masters, a Super 750 tournament, finishing runners-up to China's Feng Yanzhe and Huang Dongping.

During her junior career, Lai won a gold medal in the mixed team event at the 2009 Badminton Asia Junior Championships and a bronze medal in mixed doubles at the 2010 BWF World Junior Championships alongside Ow Yao Han. She also won a mixed team silver medal at the 2009 World Junior Championships and silver medals in mixed doubles and the mixed team event at the 2010 Asian Junior Championships.

== Achievements ==
=== Commonwealth Games ===
Mixed doubles
Year	Venue	Partner	Opponent	Score	Result
2022	National Exhibition Centre, Birmingham, England	(Malaysia) Tan Kian Meng	(Scotland) Adam Hall (Scotland) Julie MacPherson	21–15, 21–17	Bronze

=== SEA Games ===
Mixed doubles
Year	Venue	Partner	Opponent	Score	Result
2013	Wunna Theikdi Indoor Stadium; Naypyidaw, Myanmar	(Malaysia) Tan Aik Quan	(Thailand) Maneepong Jongjit (Thailand) Sapsiree Taerattanachai	15–21, 17–21	Bronze
2019	Muntinlupa Sports Complex; Metro Manila, Philippines	(Malaysia) Tan Kian Meng	(Indonesia) Praveen Jordan (Indonesia) Melati Daeva Oktavianti	16–21, 18–21	Bronze

=== BWF World Junior Championships ===
Mixed doubles
Year	Venue	Partner	Opponent	Score	Result
2010	Domo del Code Jalisco; Guadalajara, Mexico	(Malaysia) Ow Yao Han	(South Korea) Kang Ji-wook (South Korea) Choi Hye-in	19–21, 14–21	Bronze

=== Asian Junior Championships ===
Girls' doubles
Year	Venue	Partner	Opponent	Score	Result
2009	Stadium Juara; Kuala Lumpur, Malaysia	(Malaysia) Ng Hui Ern	(China) Tang Jinhua (China) Xia Huan	25–23, 15–21, 15–21	Bronze

Mixed doubles
Year	Venue	Partner	Opponent	Score	Result
2010	Stadium Juara; Kuala Lumpur, Malaysia	(Malaysia) Ow Yao Han	(China) Liu Cheng (China) Bao Yixin	Walkover	Silver

=== BWF World Tour (1 title, 8 runners-up) ===
The BWF World Tour, which was announced on 19 March 2017 and implemented in 2018, is a series of elite badminton tournaments, sanctioned by Badminton World Federation (BWF). The BWF World Tour is divided into six levels, namely World Tour Finals, Super 1000, Super 750, Super 500, Super 300 (part of the HSBC World Tour), and the BWF Tour Super 100.

Women's doubles
Year	Tournament	Level	Partner	Opponent	Score	Result
2024	Australian Open	Super 500	(Malaysia) Lim Chiew Sien	(Indonesia) Febriana Dwipuji Kusuma (Indonesia) Amallia Cahaya Pratiwi	21–12, 7–21, 13–21	(silver) Runner-up

Mixed doubles
Year	Tournament	Level	Partner	Opponent	Score	Result	Ref.
2019	Singapore Open	Super 500	(Malaysia) Tan Kian Meng	(Thailand) Dechapol Puavaranukroh (Thailand) Sapsiree Taerattanachai	14–21, 6–21	(silver) Runner-up	
2022	Korea Open	Super 500	(Malaysia) Tan Kian Meng	(South Korea) Ko Sung-hyun (South Korea) Eom Hye-won	21–15, 21–18	(gold) Winner	
2025	Macau Open	Super 300	(Malaysia) Jimmy Wong	(Denmark) Mathias Christiansen (Denmark) Alexandra Bøje	13–21, 16–21	(silver) Runner-up	
2025 (I)	Indonesia Masters	Super 100	(Malaysia) Jimmy Wong	(Denmark) Mathias Christiansen (Denmark) Alexandra Bøje	21–13, 21–23, 14–21	(silver) Runner-up	
2025 (II)	Indonesia Masters	Super 100	(Malaysia) Jimmy Wong	(Indonesia) Marwan Faza (Indonesia) Aisyah Pranata	21–16, 19–21, 3–21	(silver) Runner-up	
2025	Korea Masters	Super 300	(Malaysia) Jimmy Wong	(South Korea) Kim Jae-hyeon (South Korea) Jeong Na-eun	22–24, 18–21	(silver) Runner-up	
2026	China Masters	Super 750	(Malaysia) Hoo Pang Ron	(China) Feng Yanzhe (China) Huang Dongping	19–21, 16–21	(silver) Runner-up	
2026	French Open	Super 750	(Malaysia) Hoo Pang Ron	(China) Feng Yanzhe (China) Huang Dongping	10–21, 13–21	(silver) Runner-up	

=== BWF Grand Prix (3 titles, 5 runners-up) ===
The BWF Grand Prix had two levels, the Grand Prix and Grand Prix Gold. It was a series of badminton tournaments sanctioned by the Badminton World Federation (BWF) and played between 2007 and 2017.

Mixed doubles
Year	Tournament	Partner	Opponent	Score	Result
2012	Vietnam Open	(Malaysia) Tan Aik Quan	(Indonesia) Markis Kido (Indonesia) Pia Zebadiah Bernadet	21–23, 8–21	(silver) Runner-up
2013	Malaysia Grand Prix Gold	(Malaysia) Tan Aik Quan	(Indonesia) Praveen Jordan (Indonesia) Vita Marissa	22–20, 13–21, 17–21	(silver) Runner-up
2016	Malaysia Masters	(Malaysia) Tan Kian Meng	(China) Zheng Siwei (China) Li Yinhui	14–21, 19–21	(silver) Runner-up
2016	Chinese Taipei Open	(Malaysia) Tan Kian Meng	(China) Zheng Siwei (China) Chen Qingchen	13–21, 16–21	(silver) Runner-up
2016	Vietnam Open	(Malaysia) Tan Kian Meng	(Indonesia) Alfian Eko Prasetya (Indonesia) Annisa Saufika	21–16, 21–11	(gold) Winner
2016	Indonesian Masters	(Malaysia) Tan Kian Meng	(Indonesia) Ronald Alexander (Indonesia) Melati Daeva Oktavianti	16–21, 17–21	(silver) Runner-up
2016	Thailand Open	(Malaysia) Tan Kian Meng	(Hong Kong) Tang Chun Man (Hong Kong) Tse Ying Suet	21–16, 22–20	(gold) Winner
2017	Malaysia Masters	(Malaysia) Tan Kian Meng	(Malaysia) Goh Soon Huat (Malaysia) Shevon Jemie Lai	21–17, 21–9	(gold) Winner

BWF Grand Prix Gold tournament
BWF Grand Prix tournament

=== BWF International Challenge/Series (3 titles, 5 runners-up) ===
Women's doubles
Year	Tournament	Partner	Opponent	Score	Result
2010	Malaysia International	(Malaysia) Chin Eei Hui	(Indonesia) Gebby Ristiyani Imawan (Indonesia) Tiara Rosalia Nuraidah	21–15, 21–10	(gold) Winner

Mixed doubles
Year	Tournament	Partner	Opponent	Score	Result
2011	Smiling Fish International	(Malaysia) Tan Aik Quan	(Indonesia) Andhika Anhar (Indonesia) Keshya Nurvita Hanadia	19–21, 22–20, 21–11	(gold) Winner
2011	Malaysia International	(Malaysia) Tan Aik Quan	(Indonesia) Andhika Anhar (Indonesia) Keshya Nurvita Hanadia	21–18, 21–17	(gold) Winner
2014	Austrian International	(Malaysia) Chan Peng Soon	(Poland) Robert Mateusiak (Poland) Agnieszka Wojtkowska	15–21, 21–15, 16–21	(silver) Runner-up
2016	Polish Open	(Malaysia) Tan Kian Meng	(Poland) Robert Mateusiak (Poland) Nadieżda Zięba	11–21, 16–21	(silver) Runner-up
2025	Vietnam International	(Malaysia) Jimmy Wong	(Hong Kong) Tang Chun Man (Hong Kong) Ng Tsz Yau	19–21, 19–21	(silver) Runner-up
2025	Thailand International	(Malaysia) Jimmy Wong	(China) Gao Jiaxuan (China) Wu Mengying	17–21, 16–21	(silver) Runner-up
2025	Réunion Open	(Malaysia) Jimmy Wong	(Germany) Marvin Seidel (Germany) Thuc Phuong Nguyen	21–17, 20–22, 18–21	(silver) Runner-up

BWF International Challenge tournament
BWF International Series tournament
