= 2014 U.S. Open Grand Prix Gold =

Tournament details
- Dates: July 8, 2014 - July 13, 2014
- Total prize money: US$120,000
- Venue: Suffolk County Community College
- Location: New York, United States

The 2014 U.S. Open Grand Prix Gold was the eighth grand prix gold and grand prix tournament of the 2014 BWF Grand Prix Gold and Grand Prix. The tournament was held in Suffolk County Community College, New York, United States July 8 until July 13, 2014 and had a total purse of $120,000.

== Players by nation ==
Nation	First round	Second round	Third round	Quarterfinals	Semifinals	Final
(United States)	14	7	1	2		
(Canada)	13	8		3		
(Dominican Republic)	7	1				
(Chinese Taipei)	6	9	3	3	4	1
(France)	6	3		1		
(India)	3	2		1		
(Switzerland)	3	1				
(Czech Republic)	3		1			
(Vietnam)	3					
(Denmark)	2	3	1	1		1
(Thailand)	2	1		1	1	2
(Republic of Ireland)	2			2		
(Germany)	1	1		2		
(Austria)	1					
(Australia)	1					
(Trinidad and Tobago)	1					
(Indonesia)	1					
(Guatemala)	1					
(Belgium)	1					
(Netherlands)		1	1	1		
(Russia)		1			2	
(Japan)		3		1		1
(Hong Kong)		1	1		2	
(Sweden)		2				
(Mexico)		1				
(Israel)		1				
(Spain)		1				
(Bulgaria)				1		

== Men's singles ==
=== Seeds ===
1. (Vietnam) Nguyen Tien Minh (champion)
2. (Chinese Taipei) Chou Tien-chen (final)
3. (Netherlands) Eric Pang (third round)
4. (France) Brice Leverdez (withdrew)
5. (India) Anand Pawar (quarter-final)
6. (Hong Kong) Wong Wing Ki (semi-final)
7. (Chinese Taipei) Wang Tzu-wei (third round)
8. (Spain) Pablo Abian (withdrew)
9. (Thailand) Suppanyu Avihingsanon (quarter-final)
10. (Israel) Misha Zilberman (second round)
11. (Denmark) Emil Holst (second round)
12. (Denmark) Joachim Persson (second round)
13. (India) Arvind Bhat (second round)
14. (United States) Sattawat Pongnairat (third round)
15. (Denmark) Rasmus Fladberg (third round)
16. (Czech Republic) Petr Koukal (third round)

=== Finals ===
Quarterfinals
1	(Vietnam) Nguyen Tien Minh	18	21	21
9	(Thailand) Suppanyu Avihingsanon	21	18	5
(South Korea) Lee Hyun-il	12	17
6	(Hong Kong) Wong Wing Ki	21	21
5	(India) Anand Pawar	19	21	19
(Thailand) Khosit Phetpradab	21	16	21
(Republic of Ireland) Scott Evans	19	11
2	(Chinese Taipei) Chou Tien-chen	21	21

Semifinals
1	(Vietnam) Nguyen Tien Minh	19	21	21
6	(Hong Kong) Wong Wing Ki	21	13	14
(Thailand) Khosit Phetpradab	18	19
2	(Chinese Taipei) Chou Tien-chen	21	21

Final
1	(Vietnam) Nguyen Tien Minh	21	14	21
2	(Chinese Taipei) Chou Tien-chen	19	21	19

=== Top half ===
==== Section 1 ====
First Round
1	(Vietnam) Nguyen TM	21	21
Q3	(United States) N Waller	4	2
(India) C Anand	21	21
(Austria) L Wraber	18	16
13	(India) A Bhat	21	21
Q1	(Switzerland) M Fux	12	14
(Trinidad and Tobago) N Bonkowsky	5	9
(Chinese Taipei) Wan C-h	21	21

Second Round
1	(Vietnam) Nguyen TM	0
(India) C Anand	1^{r}
13	(India) A Bhat	15	18
(Chinese Taipei) Wan C-h	21	21

Third Round
1	(Vietnam) Nguyen TM	21	21
(Chinese Taipei) Wan C-h	13	7

==== Section 2 ====
First Round
7	(Chinese Taipei) Wang T-w	21	21
(United States) A Amphie	16	12
(United States) H Shu	21	16	21
(Chinese Taipei) Lin Y-h	14	21	19
9	(Thailand) S Avihingsanon	21	21
(France) L Claerbout	18	16
(United States) Lee HL	11	6
(Denmark) F Quach	21	21

Second Round
7	(Chinese Taipei) Wang T-w	21	21
(United States) H Shu	4	15
9	(Thailand) S Avihingsanon	17	21	21
(Denmark) F Quach	21	14	19

Third Round
7	(Chinese Taipei) Wang T-w	16	14
9	(Thailand) S Avihingsanon	21	21

==== Section 3 ====
First Round
3	(Netherlands) E Pang	21	21
(Australia) L Wang	8	8
(Lithuania) K Navickas	14	21	21
(Canada) A D'Souza	21	9	18
11	(Denmark) E Holst	21	21
(Canada) L Couture	18	13
(Czech Republic) J Frohlich	12	8
(South Korea) Lee H-i	21	21

Second Round
3	(Netherlands) E Pang	21	21
(Lithuania) K Navickas	15	11
11	(Denmark) E Holst	11	21
(South Korea) Lee H-i	21	23

Third Round
3	(Netherlands) E Pang	19	5
(South Korea) Lee H-i	21	21

==== Section 4 ====
First Round
6	(Hong Kong) Wong WK	21	21
(United States) B Seguin	16	9
(Sweden) M Westerback	21	21
(Dominican Republic) W Cabrera	14	8
10	(Israel) M Zilberman	21	21
(Dominican Republic) A Raposo	6	14
(Indonesia) N Sulistyo	7	7
(Hong Kong) Tam CH	21	21

Second Round
6	(Hong Kong) Wong WK	21	21
(Sweden) M Westerback	11	19
10	(Israel) M Zilberman	18	16
(Hong Kong) Tam CH	21	21

Third Round
6	(Hong Kong) Wong WK	21	21
(Hong Kong) Tam CH	18	14

=== Bottom half ===
==== Section 5 ====
First Round
(Mexico) L Munoz	21	21
(Canada) N Yakura	12	15
(Czech Republic) A Mendrek	7	12
14	(United States) S Pongnairat	21	21
(Denmark) S Rasmussen	18	20
(Austria) M Almer	21	22
(Guatemala) K Cordon	21	16	15
5	(India) A Pawar	18	21	21

Second Round
(Mexico) L Munoz	16	21	10
14	(United States) S Pongnairat	21	13	21
(Austria) M Almer	14	12
5	(India) A Pawar	21	21

Third Round
14	(United States) S Pongnairat	7	13
5	(India) A Pawar	21	21

==== Section 6 ====
First Round
(United States) R Chew	10	14
Q6	(Canada) B Lin	21	21
Q8	(United States) N Davies	13	10
15	(Denmark) R Fladberg	21	21
(Thailand) K Phetpradab	21	21
Q4	(Canada) J Hurlburt-Yu	12	17
(Thailand) P Thongnuam	21	21
PFQ	(United States) T Pojanakanokporn	11	18

Second Round
Q6	(Canada) B Lin	15	10
15	(Denmark) R Fladberg	21	21
(Thailand) K Phetpradab	21	17	21
(Thailand) P Thongnuam	17	21	17

Third Round
15	(Denmark) R Fladberg	21	10	23
(Thailand) K Phetpradab	12	21	25

==== Section 7 ====
First Round
(Sweden) M Borg	21	21
(Dominican Republic) N Javier	3	17
(France) M Lo Ying Ping	12	15
16	(Czech Republic) P Koukal	21	21
(Hong Kong) Ng KL	21	21
Q2	(Vietnam) Bao M	8	9
(Republic of Ireland) S Evans	21	21
PFQ	(Canada) Lam H	17	5

Second Round
(Sweden) M Borg	16	19
16	(Czech Republic) P Koukal	21	21
(Hong Kong) Ng KL	21	13	20
(Republic of Ireland) S Evans	18	21	22

Third Round
16	(Czech Republic) P Koukal	18	19
(Republic of Ireland) S Evans	21	21

==== Section 8 ====
First Round
(Belgium) M Moreels	15	16
(Chinese Taipei) Lu C-h	21	21
Q5	(Canada) L Woodside	19	16
12	(Denmark) J Persson	21	21
(Canada) T Chiu	14	13
(Chinese Taipei) Shih K-c	21	21
Q7	(Canada) M Guiffre	9	6
2	(Chinese Taipei) Chou T-c	21	21

Second Round
(Chinese Taipei) Lu C-h	21	17	21
12	(Denmark) J Persson	16	21	16
(Chinese Taipei) Shih K-c	11	19
2	(Chinese Taipei) Chou T-c	21	21

Third Round
(Chinese Taipei) Lu C-h	16	11
2	(Chinese Taipei) Chou T-c	21	21

== Women's singles ==
=== Seeds ===
1. (Thailand) Nichaon Jindapon (first round)
2. (Canada) Michelle Li (quarter-final)
3. (United States) Zhang Beiwen (champion)
4. (Spain) Beatriz Corrales (second round)
5. (Bulgaria) Linda Zechiri (quarter-final)
6. (Republic of Ireland) Chloe Magee (first round)
7. (Germany) Karin Schnaase (first round)
8. (Russia) Natalia Perminova (second round)

=== Finals ===
Semifinals
(Hong Kong) Cheung Ngan Yi	16	18
3	(United States) Zhang Beiwen	21	21
(Japan) Kana Ito	21	24
(Chinese Taipei) Hsu Ya-ching	11	22

Final
3	(United States) Zhang Beiwen	21	21
(Japan) Kana Ito	8	17

=== Top half ===
==== Section 1 ====
First Round
1	(Thailand) N Jindapon	21	21	22
Q4	(Japan) A Sakuramoto	16	23	24
(Hong Kong) Cheung NY	21	21
(Chinese Taipei) Chiang M-h	18	18
5	(Bulgaria) L Zechiri	17	21	21
(Russia) E Dimova	21	8	12
(Switzerland) S Jaquet	8	21	16
(Chinese Taipei) Hung S-h	21	8	21

Second Round
Q4	(Japan) A Sakuramoto	21	17	19
(Hong Kong) Cheung NY	19	21	21
5	(Bulgaria) L Zechiri	21	21
(Chinese Taipei) Hung S-h	17	18

Quarterfinals
(Hong Kong) Cheung NY	21	21
5	(Bulgaria) L Zechiri	8	11

==== Section 2 ====
First Round
3	(United States) Zhang BW	21	21
(Russia) A Chervaykova	7	14
(Japan) A Mine	21	21
(Chinese Taipei) Cheng C-y	18	16
7	(Germany) K Schnaase	21	23	15
Q2	(United States) Rong B	17	25	21
Q3	(Japan) A Doi	21	21
(Vietnam) Vu TT	8	9

Second Round
3	(United States) Zhang BW	21	18	21
(Japan) A Mine	15	21	15
Q2	(United States) Rong B	18	16
Q3	(Japan) A Doi	21	21

Quarterfinals
3	(United States) Zhang BW	22	21
Q3	(Japan) A Doi	20	18

=== Bottom half ===
==== Section 3 ====
First Round
(Chinese Taipei) Pai Y-p	12	21	21
(United States) J Subandhi	21	19	10
(Chinese Taipei) Lin Y-c	21	19	21
6	(Republic of Ireland) C Magee	11	21	14
(Japan) K Ito	22	21
(United States) I Wang	20	15
(Czech Republic) Z Pavelkova	10	12
4	(Spain) B Corrales	21	21

Second Round
(Chinese Taipei) Pai Y-p	19	21	21
(Chinese Taipei) Lin Y-c	21	14	13
(Japan) K Ito	21	21
4	(Spain) B Corrales	19	10

Quarterfinals
(Chinese Taipei) Pai Y-p	21	10	16
(Japan) K Ito	16	21	21

==== Section 4 ====
First Round
(Chinese Taipei) Hsu Y-c	21	21
(Dominican Republic) V Beronica	11	12
(France) P Le Buhanic	18	18
8	(Russia) N Perminova	21	21
Q1	(Canada) R Honderich	21	30
(Chinese Taipei) Lee C-h	15	28
(United States) C Look	5	6
2	(Canada) M Li	21	21

Second Round
(Chinese Taipei) Hsu Y-c	13	21	21
8	(Russia) N Perminova	21	16	18
Q1	(Canada) R Honderich	10	8
2	(Canada) M Li	21	21

Quarterfinals
(Chinese Taipei) Hsu Y-c	24	21
2	(Canada) M Li	22	13

== Men's doubles ==
=== Seeds ===
1. (Denmark) Mathias Boe / Carsten Mogensen (final)
2. (Thailand) Maneepong Jongjit / Nipitphon Puangpuapech (champion)
3. (France) Baptiste Careme / Ronan Labar (quarter-final)
4. (United States) Phillip Chew / Sattawat Pongnairat (quarter-final)

=== Finals ===
Semifinals
1	(Denmark) Mathias Boe (Denmark) Carsten Mogensen	21	21
(Chinese Taipei) Liao Min-chun (Chinese Taipei) Tseng Min-hao	15	14
(Chinese Taipei) Liang Jui-wei (Chinese Taipei) Lu Chia-bin	18	14
2	(Thailand) Maneepong Jongjit (Thailand) Nipitphon Puangpuapech	21	21

Final
1	(Denmark) Mathias Boe (Denmark) Carsten Mogensen	17	21	18
2	(Thailand) Maneepong Jongjit (Thailand) Nipitphon Puangpuapech	21	15	21

=== Top half ===
==== Section 1 ====
First Round
1	(Denmark) M Boe (Denmark) C Mogensen
BYE
(Chinese Taipei) Huang C-e (Chinese Taipei) Wang C-m	9	22
(Germany) M Schwenger (Germany) J Zurwonne	21	24
(Chinese Taipei) Lin C-y (Chinese Taipei) Wu H-l
(India) Sanjeeth S. (India) J Yadav	wo
(Canada) A Liu (Canada) D Ng	21	21
(Dominican Republic) N Javier (Dominican Republic) A Raposo	10	11

Second Round
1	(Denmark) M Boe (Denmark) C Mogensen	21	21
(Germany) M Schwenger (Germany) J Zurwonne	11	17
(Chinese Taipei) Lin C-y (Chinese Taipei) Wu H-l	21	21
(Canada) A Liu (Canada) D Ng	16	18

Quarterfinals
1	(Denmark) M Boe (Denmark) C Mogensen	21	21
(Chinese Taipei) Lin C-y (Chinese Taipei) Wu H-l	14	15

==== Section 2 ====
First Round
4	(United States) P Chew (United States) S Pongnairat
BYE
(United States) A Chong (United States) T Pojanakanokporn
(Czech Republic) J Frohlich (Switzerland) M Fux	wo
(Chinese Taipei) Liao M-c (Chinese Taipei) Tseng M-h	21	21
(United States) N Davies (United States) M Lai	12	7
(France) L Constantin (France) M Lo Ying Ping	21	21
(Republic of Ireland) J Magee (Republic of Ireland) S Magee	19	17

Second Round
4	(United States) P Chew (United States) S Pongnairat	21	21
(United States) A Chong (United States) T Pojanakanokporn	7	13
(Chinese Taipei) Liao M-c (Chinese Taipei) Tseng M-h	21	21
(France) L Constantin (France) M Lo Ying Ping	16	10

Quarterfinals
4	(United States) P Chew (United States) S Pongnairat	16	16
(Chinese Taipei) Liao M-c (Chinese Taipei) Tseng M-h	21	21

=== Bottom half ===
==== Section 3 ====
First Round
(India) A Ahlawat (India) A Chhikara	18	4
(Chinese Taipei) Liang J-w (Chinese Taipei) Lu C-b	21	21
(Chinese Taipei) Wan C-h (Chinese Taipei) Wang T-w	21	21
(United States) M Fogarty (United States) B Seguin	15	8
(Canada) J Hurlburt-Yu (Canada) B Lin	21	22
(United States) A Amphie (United States) A Shekhtman	10	20
BYE
3	(France) B Careme (France) R Labar

Second Round
(Chinese Taipei) Liang J-w (Chinese Taipei) Lu C-b	26	21
(Chinese Taipei) Wan C-h (Chinese Taipei) Wang T-w	24	13
(Canada) J Hurlburt-Yu (Canada) B Lin	13	19
3	(France) B Careme (France) R Labar	21	21

Quarterfinals
(Chinese Taipei) Liang J-w (Chinese Taipei) Lu C-b	21	16	21
3	(France) B Careme (France) R Labar	19	21	19

==== Section 4 ====
First Round
(Denmark) R Fladberg (Denmark) E Holst	21	21
(Canada) K Li (Canada) N Yakura	11	12
(United States) R Chew (United States) R Gunawan	21	17	25
(India) G Prasad (India) V Prasad	18	21	23
(Chinese Taipei) Chen C-j (Chinese Taipei) Wang C-l	21	21
(Canada) P Charron (Canada) T Ng	13	12
BYE
2	(Thailand) M Jongjit (Thailand) N Puangpuapech

Second Round
(Denmark) R Fladberg (Denmark) E Holst	21	21
(United States) R Chew (United States) R Gunawan	12	18
(Chinese Taipei) Chen C-j (Chinese Taipei) Wang C-l	16	19
2	(Thailand) M Jongjit (Thailand) N Puangpuapech	21	21

Quarterfinals
(Denmark) R Fladberg (Denmark) E Holst	14	10
2	(Thailand) M Jongjit (Thailand) N Puangpuapech	21	21

== Women's doubles ==
=== Seeds ===
1. (United States) Eva Lee / Paula Lynn Obanana (second round)
2. (Russia) Anastasia Chervaykova / Nina Vislova (semi-final)
3. (Thailand) Puttita Supajirakul / Sapsiree Taerattanachai (final)
4. (Canada) Nicole Grether / Charmaine Reid (second round)

=== Finals ===
Semifinals
(Chinese Taipei) Cheng Chi-ya (Chinese Taipei) Lee Chia-hsin	11	17
3	(Thailand) Puttita Supajirakul (Thailand) Sapsiree Taerattanachai	21	21
(Indonesia) Shendy Puspa Irawati (Indonesia) Vita Marissa	21	21
2	(Russia) Anastasia Chervaykova (Russia) Nina Vislova	7	15

Final
3	(Thailand) Puttita Supajirakul (Thailand) Sapsiree Taerattanachai	15	10
(Indonesia) Shendy Puspa Irawati (Indonesia) Vita Marissa	21	21

=== Top half ===
==== Section 1 ====
First Round
1	(United States) E Lee (United States) P Obanana
BYE
(Chinese Taipei) Chiang K-h (Chinese Taipei) Wu F-c
BYE
(Chinese Taipei) Cheng C-y (Chinese Taipei) Lee C-h
BYE
(Japan) R Eto (Japan) A Matsuda	19	21	21
(Canada) A Bruce (Canada) P Chan	21	18	10

Second Round
1	(United States) E Lee (United States) P Obanana	11	14
(Chinese Taipei) Chiang K-h (Chinese Taipei) Wu F-c	21	21
(Chinese Taipei) Cheng C-y (Chinese Taipei) Lee C-h	23	21	21
(Japan) R Eto (Japan) A Matsuda	25	11	19

Quarterfinals
(Chinese Taipei) Chiang K-h (Chinese Taipei) Wu F-c	8	21
(Chinese Taipei) Cheng C-y (Chinese Taipei) Lee C-h	21	23

==== Section 2 ====
First Round
3	(Thailand) P Supajirakul (Thailand) S Taerattanachai
BYE
(France) P Le Buhanic (France) T Vignes Waran
BYE
(Dominican Republic) V Beronica (Dominican Republic) D Saturria
BYE
(Chinese Taipei) Chen S-y (Chinese Taipei) Lin Y-c	21	15
(Canada) G Gao (Canada) R Honderich	23	21

Second Round
3	(Thailand) P Supajirakul (Thailand) S Taerattanachai	21	21
(France) P Le Buhanic (France) T Vignes Waran	10	16
(Dominican Republic) V Beronica (Dominican Republic) D Saturria	4	10
(Canada) G Gao (Canada) R Honderich	21	21

Quarterfinals
3	(Thailand) P Supajirakul (Thailand) S Taerattanachai	21	21
(Canada) G Gao (Canada) R Honderich	17	14

=== Bottom half ===
==== Section 3 ====
First Round
(France) M Luttmann (France) A Vanderstukken	11	11
(Netherlands) S Barning (Netherlands) I Tabeling	21	21
BYE
(Germany) J Goliszewski (Germany) C Nelte
(Chinese Taipei) Kuo Y-w (Chinese Taipei) Wang P-r	17	15
(Indonesia) S Irawati (Indonesia) V Marissa	21	21
BYE
4	(Canada) N Grether (Canada) C Reid

Second Round
(Netherlands) S Barning (Netherlands) I Tabeling	18	21	13
(Germany) J Goliszewski (Germany) C Nelte	21	13	21
(Indonesia) S Irawati (Indonesia) V Marissa	21	21
4	(Canada) N Grether (Canada) C Reid	15	13

Quarterfinals
(Germany) J Goliszewski (Germany) C Nelte	14	11
(Indonesia) S Irawati (Indonesia) V Marissa	21	21

==== Section 4 ====
First Round
(France) L Choinet (France) E Lefel	wo
(Chinese Taipei) Hsu Y-c (Chinese Taipei) Pai Y-p
BYE
(United States) Hong JY (United States) Zhang BW
BYE
(Chinese Taipei) Chiang M-h (Chinese Taipei) Hung S-h
BYE
2	(Russia) A Chervaykova (Russia) N Vislova

Second Round
(Chinese Taipei) Hsu Y-c (Chinese Taipei) Pai Y-p	11	10
(United States) Hong JY (United States) Zhang BW	21	21
(Chinese Taipei) Chiang M-h (Chinese Taipei) Hung S-h	14	14
2	(Russia) A Chervaykova (Russia) N Vislova	21	21

Quarterfinals
(United States) Hong JY (United States) Zhang BW	15	16
2	(Russia) A Chervaykova (Russia) N Vislova	21	21

== Mixed doubles ==
=== Seeds ===
1. (Thailand) Maneepong Jongjit / Sapsiree Taerattanachai (final)
2. (Russia) Vitalij Durkin / Nina Vislova (semi-final)
3. (Netherlands) Jorrit de Ruiter / Samantha Barning (quarter-final)
4. (Germany) Max Schwenger / Carla Nelte (quarter-final)

=== Finals ===
Semifinals
1	(Thailand) Maneepong Jongjit (Thailand) Sapsiree Taerattanachai	21	24
(Chinese Taipei) Lin Chia-yu (Chinese Taipei) Wang Pei-rong	14	22
(Indonesia) Muhammad Rijal (Indonesia) Vita Marissa	21	21
2	(Russia) Vitalij Durkin (Russia) Nina Vislova	17	15

Final
1	(Thailand) Maneepong Jongjit (Thailand) Sapsiree Taerattanachai	16	19
(Indonesia) Muhammad Rijal (Indonesia) Vita Marissa	21	21

=== Top half ===
==== Section 1 ====
First Round
1	(Thailand) M Jongjit (Thailand) S Taerattanachai
BYE
(Dominican Republic) W Cabrera (Dominican Republic) D Saturria	13	10
(Canada) T Ng (Canada) A Bruce	21	21
(France) M Lo Ying Ping (France) A Vanderstukken	15	15
(United States) Lee HL (United States) E Lee	21	21
(Republic of Ireland) S Magee (Republic of Ireland) C Magee	21	21
(Russia) E Dremin (Russia) E Dimova	18	12

Second Round
1	(Thailand) M Jongjit (Thailand) S Taerattanachai	21	21
(Canada) T Ng (Canada) A Bruce	12	16
(United States) Lee HL (United States) E Lee	9	18
(Republic of Ireland) S Magee (Republic of Ireland) C Magee	21	21

Quarterfinals
1	(Thailand) M Jongjit (Thailand) S Taerattanachai	20	21	21
(Republic of Ireland) S Magee (Republic of Ireland) C Magee	22	18	15

==== Section 2 ====
First Round
3	(Netherlands) J de Ruiter (Netherlands) S Barning	21	21
(Denmark) R Holmgaard (Denmark) M Falkenberg	5	8
(Canada) L Woodside (Canada) Chen QF	14	12
(France) B Careme (Switzerland) S Jaquet	21	21
(United States) P Garcia-Flores (United States) J Myers	4	8
(Chinese Taipei) Lu C-h (Chinese Taipei) Lee C-h	21	21
(France) R Labar (France) E Lefel	wo
(Chinese Taipei) Lin C-y (Chinese Taipei) Wang P-r

Second Round
3	(Netherlands) J de Ruiter (Netherlands) S Barning	21	17	23
(France) B Careme (Switzerland) S Jaquet	14	21	21
(Chinese Taipei) Lu C-h (Chinese Taipei) Lee C-h	9	17
(Chinese Taipei) Lin C-y (Chinese Taipei) Wang P-r	21	21

Quarterfinals
3	(Netherlands) J de Ruiter (Netherlands) S Barning	21	10	14
(Chinese Taipei) Lin C-y (Chinese Taipei) Wang P-r	19	21	21

=== Bottom half ===
==== Section 3 ====
First Round
(Canada) P Charron (Canada) P Chan	18	17
(Indonesia) M Rijal (Indonesia) V Marissa	21	21
(Canada) K Li (Canada) R Honderich	21	16	14
(Chinese Taipei) Wang C-l (Chinese Taipei) Cheng C-y	14	21	21
(Canada) H Wiebe (Canada) G Gao	21	21
(France) L Constantin (France) L Choinet	12	17
(Chinese Taipei) Wu H-l (Chinese Taipei) Kuo Y-w	20	21	15
4	(Germany) M Schwenger (Germany) C Nelte	22	18	21

Second Round
(Indonesia) M Rijal (Indonesia) V Marissa	20	21	21
(Chinese Taipei) Wang C-l (Chinese Taipei) Cheng C-y	22	13	17
(Canada) H Wiebe (Canada) G Gao	18	10
4	(Germany) M Schwenger (Germany) C Nelte	21	21

Quarterfinals
(Indonesia) M Rijal (Indonesia) V Marissa	16	21	21
4	(Germany) M Schwenger (Germany) C Nelte	21	7	19

==== Section 4 ====
First Round
(Dominican Republic) N Javier (Dominican Republic) V Beronica	9	12
(Canada) A Liu (Canada) J Ko	21	21
(United States) P Chew (United States) J Subandhi	22	17	21
(Thailand) N Puangpuapech (Thailand) P Supajirakul	20	21	13
(Canada) N Yakura (Canada) B Tam	21	12	30
(Vietnam) Bao M (Vietnam) Vu TT	19	21	28
BYE
2	(Russia) V Durkin (Russia) N Vislova

Second Round
(Canada) A Liu (Canada) J Ko	21	15	21
(United States) P Chew (United States) J Subandhi	19	21	18
(Canada) N Yakura (Canada) B Tam	9	25
2	(Russia) V Durkin (Russia) N Vislova	21	27

Quarterfinals
(Canada) A Liu (Canada) J Ko	9	15
2	(Russia) V Durkin (Russia) N Vislova	21	21

Preceded by 2014 Canada Open Grand Prix	BWF Grand Prix Gold and Grand Prix; 2014 season	Succeeded by 2014 Chinese Taipei Open Grand Prix Gold
