= Kana Ito =

Japanese badminton player (born 1985)

Kana Itō
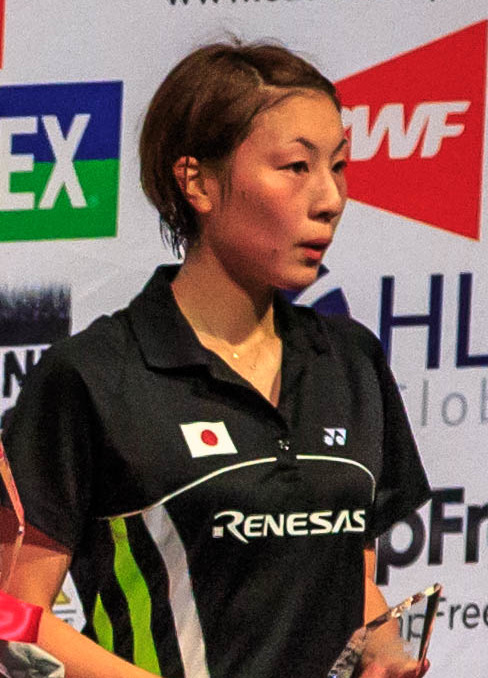
- Itō at the 2014 U.S. Open Grand Prix Gold

Personal information
- Born: 15 September 1985 (age 41) Kanazawa, Ishikawa Prefecture, Japan
- Height: 1.65 m (5 ft 5 in)

Sport
- Country: Japan
- Sport: Badminton
- Handedness: Right

Women's singles & doubles
- Highest ranking: 38 (WS 9 April 2015); 91 (WD with Hitomi Oka, 2 December 2010)
- BWF profile

Kana Ito (伊東可奈, Itō Kana; born 15 September 1985) is a Japanese badminton player who affiliated with Saishunkan team.

== Career ==
Kana Ito won the 2010 Polish Open, 2012 Croatioan International, 2012 Banuinvest International, and 2015 Vietnam International tournaments in women's singles event. She participated in the 2016 U.S. Open Grand Prix Gold, and many more. She was there the runner up and lost to Zhang Beiwen of United States in the final.

== Achievements ==
=== BWF Grand Prix ===
The BWF Grand Prix had two levels, the BWF Grand Prix and Grand Prix Gold. It was a series of badminton tournaments sanctioned by the Badminton World Federation (BWF) which was held from 2007 to 2017.

Women's singles
Year	Tournament	Opponent	Score	Result
2014	New Zealand Open	(Japan) Nozomi Okuhara	15–21, 3–21	(silver) Runner-up
2014	U.S. Open	(United States) Beiwen Zhang	8–21, 17–21	(silver) Runner-up

BWF Grand Prix Gold tournament
BWF Grand Prix tournament

=== BWF International Challenge/Series ===
Women's singles
Year	Tournament	Opponent	Score	Result
2010	Polish International	(Hong Kong) Chan Tsz Ka	21–14, 21–18	(gold) Winner
2010	Croatian International	(Germany) Nicole Grether	21–11, 17–21, 22–24	(silver) Runner-up
2011	Brazil International	(Canada) Michelle Li	15–21, 15–21	(silver) Runner-up
2012	Croatian International	(Turkey) Neslihan Yigit	21–18, 21–15	(gold) Winner
2012	Banuinvest International	(Japan) Ayumi Mine	21–19, 21–12	(gold) Winner
2014	Sydney International	(Japan) Yuki Fukushima	11–2, 6–11, 9–11, 9–11	(silver) Runner-up
2015	Vietnam International	(Indonesia) Aprilia Yuswandari	14–21, 21–18, 18–11 retired	(gold) Winner

Women's doubles
Year	Tournament	Partner	Opponent	Score	Result
2011	Polish Open	(Japan) Asumi Kugo	(Japan) Rie Eto (Japan) Yu Wakita	16–21, 9–21	(silver) Runner-up

BWF International Challenge tournament
BWF International Series tournament
