= Badminton at the 2013 SEA Games =

- Venue: Wunna Theikdi Indoor Stadium
- Dates: 10–14 December 2013

Badminton at the 2013 SEA Games was held in Wunna Theikdi Indoor Stadium, Myanmar between 10 and 14 December. This edition was the first time that team event was not held.

== Medal summary ==
=== Medal table ===
Rank	Nation	Gold	Silver	Bronze	Total
1	Indonesia	3	3	1	7
2	Thailand	1	2	3	6
3	Malaysia	1	0	3	4
4	Vietnam	0	0	2	2
5	Singapore	0	0	1	1
Totals (5 entries)		5	5	10	20

=== Events ===
Event	Gold	Silver	Bronze
Men's singles	Tanongsak Saensomboonsuk; Thailand	Dionysius Hayom Rumbaka; Indonesia	Nguyễn Tiến Minh; Vietnam
Men's singles	Tanongsak Saensomboonsuk; Thailand	Dionysius Hayom Rumbaka; Indonesia	Wisnu Yuli Prasetyo; Indonesia
Women's singles	Bellaetrix Manuputty; Indonesia	Busanan Ongbamrungphan; Thailand	Nitchaon Jindapol; Thailand
Women's singles	Bellaetrix Manuputty; Indonesia	Busanan Ongbamrungphan; Thailand	Vũ Thị Trang; Vietnam
Men's doubles	Indonesia (INA); Angga Pratama; Rian Agung Saputro	Indonesia (INA); Berry Angriawan; Ricky Karanda Suwardi	Malaysia (MAS); Lim Khim Wah; Ow Yao Han
Men's doubles	Indonesia (INA); Angga Pratama; Rian Agung Saputro	Indonesia (INA); Berry Angriawan; Ricky Karanda Suwardi	Malaysia (MAS); Goh V Shem; Teo Kok Siang
Women's doubles	Malaysia (MAS); Vivian Hoo; Woon Khe Wei	Indonesia (INA); Nitya Krishinda Maheswari; Greysia Polii	Thailand (THA); Sapsiree Taerattanachai; Puttita Supajirakul
Women's doubles	Malaysia (MAS); Vivian Hoo; Woon Khe Wei	Indonesia (INA); Nitya Krishinda Maheswari; Greysia Polii	Singapore (SIN); Shinta Mulia Sari; Yao Lei
Mixed doubles	Indonesia (INA); Muhammad Rijal; Debby Susanto	Thailand (THA); Maneepong Jongjit; Sapsiree Taerattanachai	Thailand (THA); Nipitphon Phuangphuapet; Puttita Supajirakul
Mixed doubles	Indonesia (INA); Muhammad Rijal; Debby Susanto	Thailand (THA); Maneepong Jongjit; Sapsiree Taerattanachai	Malaysia (MAS); Tan Aik Quan; Lai Pei Jing
