= Sapsiree Taerattanachai =

Thai badminton player (born 1992)

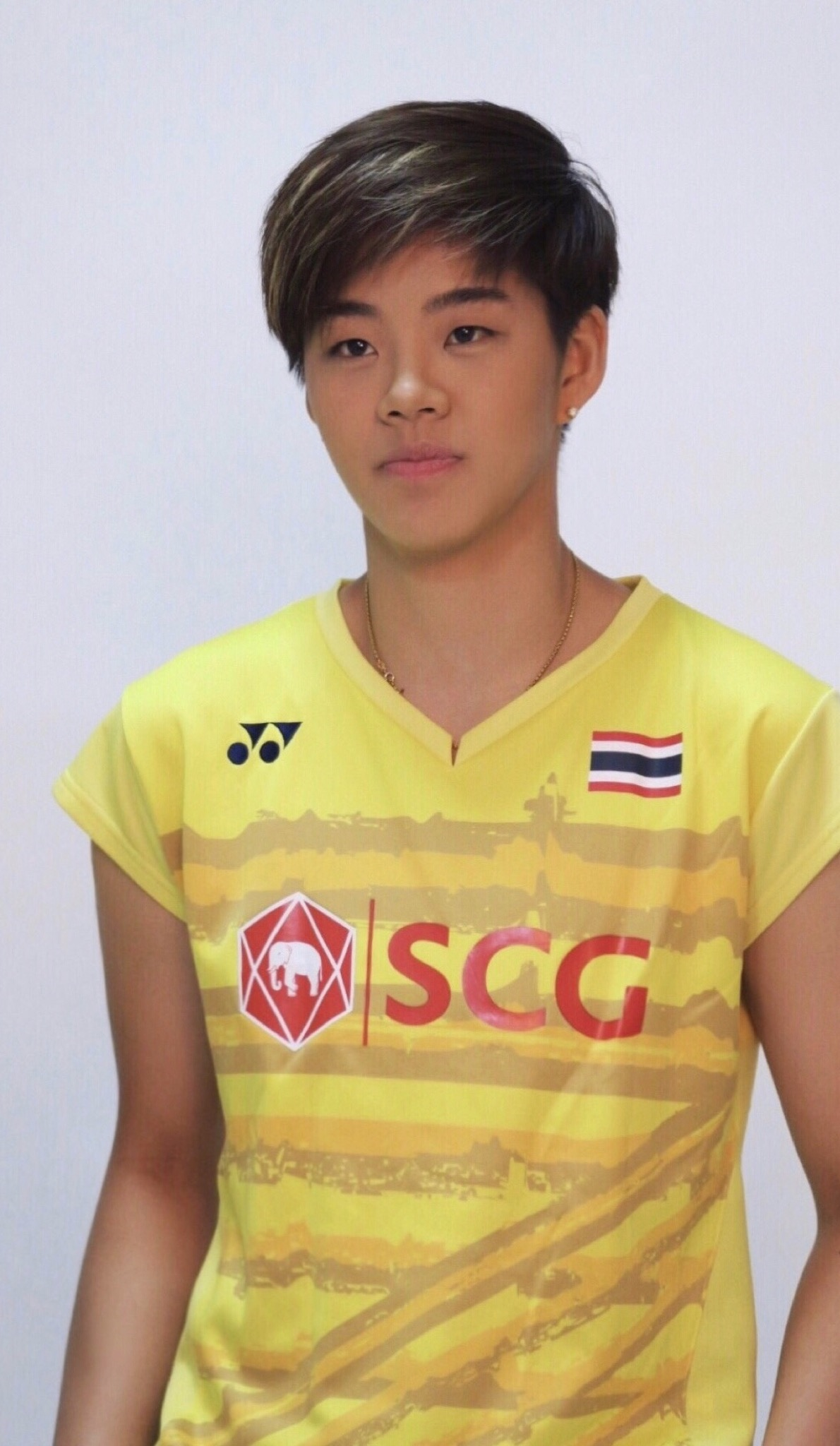
- Sapsiree in 2017

Personal information
- Nickname: Popor
- Born: 18 April 1992 (age 34) Udon Thani, Thailand
- Height: 1.69 m (5 ft 7 in)
- Weight: 55 kg (121 lb)

Sport
- Country: Thailand
- Sport: Badminton
- Handedness: Right

Women's singles and doubles
- Highest ranking: 14 (WS 12 September 2013); 9 (WD with Puttita Supajirakul, 16 February 2017); 1 (XD with Dechapol Puavaranukroh, 7 December 2021)
- Current ranking: 18 (XD with Pakkapon Teeraratsakul, 17 November 2026)
- BWF profile
Medal record
Women's badminton
Representing Thailand
World Championships
Gold medal – first place	2021 Huelva	Mixed doubles
Silver medal – second place	2019 Basel	Mixed doubles
Bronze medal – third place	2022 Tokyo	Women's doubles
Sudirman Cup
Bronze medal – third place	2013 Kuala Lumpur	Mixed team
Bronze medal – third place	2017 Gold Coast	Mixed team
Bronze medal – third place	2019 Nanning	Mixed team
Uber Cup
Silver medal – second place	2018 Bangkok	Women's team
Bronze medal – third place	2012 Wuhan	Women's team
Bronze medal – third place	2020 Aarhus	Women's team
Asian Games
Silver medal – second place	2010 Guangzhou	Women's team
Bronze medal – third place	2018 Jakarta–Palembang	Women's team
Bronze medal – third place	2022 Hangzhou	Women's team
Asian Championships
Silver medal – second place	2017 Wuhan	Mixed doubles
Bronze medal – third place	2019 Wuhan	Mixed doubles
Asia Mixed Team Championships
Bronze medal – third place	2017 Ho Chi Minh	Mixed team
Bronze medal – third place	2025 Qingdao	Mixed team
Asia Team Championships
Bronze medal – third place	2016 Hyderabad	Women's team
SEA Games
Gold medal – first place	2011 Jakarta–Palembang	Women's team
Gold medal – first place	2015 Singapore	Women's team
Gold medal – first place	2017 Kuala Lumpur	Mixed doubles
Gold medal – first place	2017 Kuala Lumpur	Women's team
Gold medal – first place	2025 Thailand	Women's team
Silver medal – second place	2013 Naypyidaw	Mixed doubles
Silver medal – second place	2017 Kuala Lumpur	Women's doubles
Bronze medal – third place	2009 Vientiane	Women's team
Bronze medal – third place	2013 Naypyidaw	Women's doubles
Bronze medal – third place	2015 Singapore	Mixed doubles
Youth Olympic Games
Gold medal – first place	2010 Singapore	Girls' singles
World Junior Championships
Bronze medal – third place	2009 Alor Setar	Girls' doubles
Bronze medal – third place	2009 Alor Setar	Mixed team
Asian Junior Championships
Silver medal – second place	2010 Kuala Lumpur	Girls' singles
Bronze medal – third place	2009 Kuala Lumpur	Girls' doubles
Bronze medal – third place	2009 Kuala Lumpur	Mixed team
Bronze medal – third place	2010 Kuala Lumpur	Mixed team

Sapsiree Taerattanachai (Thai: ทรัพย์สิรี แต้รัตนชัย; RTGS: Sapsiri Tae-rattanachai; born 18 April 1992) is a Thai badminton player. She claimed titles in the mixed doubles with Dechapol Puavaranukroh at the 2017 SEA Games and at the 2021 World Championships. Sapsiree and Dechapol made history as the first ever Thai pair to win the year-end Finals tournaments, the World Championships title and rank first in the world ranking.

Sapsiree competed at the 2010, 2014, 2018 and 2022 Asian Games; as well at the 2016, 2020 and 2024 Summer Olympics. In 2009, she was a semi-finalist in girls' doubles at the World Junior Championships, and the following year, she was runner-up at the Asian Junior Championships. She won gold at the Youth Olympic Games in Singapore. By winning the women's doubles title at the 2012 India Open Grand Prix Gold, women's singles title at the 2013 U.S. Open, and mixed doubles title at the 2017 Swiss Open, she became the first player ever to become a Grand Prix Gold winner in all three disciplines.

Sapsiree and Dechapol won the silver medal at the 2019 World Championships, and a gold medal at the 2021 World Championships. The duo made a clean sweep of all three 2020 Asian Leg titles in Thailand, and all 2021 Bali leg titles and climbed to world number 1 in BWF ranking on 7 December 2021.

== Personal life ==
Her family is considered to be wealthy. Her parents owns a gold shop in Udon Thani city. For the 2024 Summer Olympics in Paris, her brother bought a large LED billboard in front of their house to broadcast her matches live so that Udon Thani people could cheer her on, along with free water and parking.

She graduated from Chulalongkorn University. Sapsiree is nicknamed "Popor". Her knee injury during the 2017 SEA Games Final was a minor speed bump to her long successful career. She has a made a very strong comeback in 2019 by producing extremely good results.

In addition, she is also close friends with famous actress Pimchanok Luevisadpaibul.

== Career ==
=== Early career ===
Sapsiree began her badminton journey in Udon Thani at the age of nine, initially joining her university-level badminton player parents at the courts just for recreation. Her competitive drive was ignited after a crushing shutout defeat in her very first tournament, pushing her to practice seriously and eventually enter regional competitions by age 14. Her early dedication paid off remarkably in 2009 when, at just 17 years old, she teamed up with Rodjana Chuthabunditkul to secure third-place finishes in the girls' doubles at both the Asian and World Junior Championships. That same year, she grabbed the spotlight by stunning world junior champion Ratchanok Intanon to clinch the Malaysia International Challenge title. Partnered with Porntip Buranaprasertsuk, they won the Smiling Fish International tournament. She was then called up to the Thai national team at the 2009 Vientiane SEA Games, where her team won a bronze medal. Sapsiree's early career reached its first major peak in 2010 under the SCG Badminton Academy, where she made history by winning a gold medal in the girls' singles at the inaugural Youth Olympic Games in Singapore, and a silver medal at the Asian Junior Championships. She also won a silver medal in the women's team event at the Guangzhou Asian Games.

=== 2011–2013: First Grand Prix title ===
In 2011, Sapsiree reached the women's singles final at the Vietnam International Challenge, finishing as runner-up to Tee Jing Yi. Later that year, she helped the Thai women's team capture the gold medal at the 2011 SEA Games in Jakarta. Sapsiree was then part of the Thai 2012 Uber Cup team that won the bronze medal, after the team being defeated by China in the semi-finals. She won her first ever Grand Prix title at the 2012 India Open Grand Prix Gold in the women's doubles with partner Savitree Amitrapai. The duo later finished as runners-up at the 2013 Australian Open. In July 2013, she won the women's singles title at the U.S. Open Grand Prix Gold by defeating Japan's Yuka Kusunose. In December, Sapsiree concluded her season at the SEA Games in Naypyidaw, where she won a bronze medal in the women's doubles and a silver medal in the mixed doubles.

=== 2014–2016: Third Grand Prix title ===
In 2014, Sapsiree reached two finals at the U.S. Open, finishing as the runner-up in the women's doubles with Puttita Supajirakul and in the mixed doubles alongside Maneepong Jongjit. Later, with her partner Puttita, they became runners-up at both the 2015 USA International Challenge and the Mexico City Grand Prix. A major highlight of this period according to regional media was her tactical transition to a permanent mixed doubles partnership with Dechapol Puavaranukroh in late 2015, a structural move orchestrated by the Badminton Association of Thailand to build a new world-class combination. She then made her fourth appearance at the SEA Games in Singapore, where she anchored the Thai national squad to capture the gold medal in the women's team event before securing an individual bronze medal in the mixed doubles with Sudket Prapakamol.

Sapsiree experienced a competitive year in 2016, starting with a mixed doubles runner-up finish alongside Dechapol at the Syed Modi International. Shortly after, she also finished as the women's doubles runner-up at the German Open with partner Puttita. In February, Sapsiree helped the Thai national team to a bronze medal finish at the inaugural Asia Team Championships in Hyderabad. Her momentum continued into March as she and Puttita clinched the women's doubles crown at the Polish Open. She reached the women's doubles quarter-finals in the Asian Championships, and secured a spot to compete at the Rio Olympics. In her Olympic debut, Sapsiree and Puttita were eliminated in the women's doubles group stage. She later secured her third Grand Prix title on home soil at the Thailand Open. Finally, Sapsiree closed out her notable 2016 podium run in December with a mixed doubles runner-up finish at the Korea Masters in Jeju.

=== 2017: First player to win Grand Prix Gold titles across three different disciplines ===
In 2017, Sapsiree contributing to the national team by securing a bronze medal at the Sudirman Cup, and at the Asia Mixed Team Championships. Her dominance peaked at the SEA Games in Kuala Lumpur, where she captured 2 gold medals in the mixed doubles and women's team and an addition a silver in the women's doubles before suffering a knee injury in the final match. She and partner Dechapol upset world number 1 Zheng Siwei and Chen Qingchen to reach the final of the Asian Championships. Later in the final, they were defeated by world number two Lu Kai and Huang Yaqiong. At the Singapore Open, they finished as runner-up. Earlier in February, on home soil Thailand Masters, she reaching two finals to finish as the runner-up in both the mixed and women's doubles. At the Swiss Open, where she clinching the mixed doubles crown officially made her the first player in history to win Grand Prix Gold titles across three different disciplines: singles, doubles, and mixed doubles.

=== 2018–2019: Silver medal in the World Championships and Uber Cup ===
In 2018, Sapsiree helps the national team to reach the final of the Uber Cup, secured a silver medal. She competed at the Asian Games in Jakarta, contributing to the Thai women's national team's success in bringing home a bronze medal. Furthermore, in the mixed doubles with Dechapol, together they became finalists at the Denmark Open.

Starting the 2019 season as runners-up at both the Thailand and Malaysia Masters, Sapsiree and her mixed doubles partner, Dechapol, achieved a major breakthrough at the Singapore Open. There, they upset the world number one pair of Zheng Siwei and Huang Yaqiong in the semi-finals, snapping their 18-match winning streak en route to capturing the title. The duo repeated this feat at the Korea Open, defeating them in a 34-minute straight-games final to claim the title. Sapsiree's resurgent season was further bolstered by a silver medal at the World Championships, a bronze at the Asian Championships, and a victory at the Macau Open.

=== 2020–2021: World number 1 and World Championships gold ===
The years 2020 and 2021 marked a golden era of Sapsiree and Dechapol. Despite the COVID-19 pandemic disrupted calendar, Sapsiree historic run began in March, reaching the final of the All England Open to claim the runner-up position. Moving into early 2021, the duo achieved an unprecedented feat during the "Asian Leg" in Bangkok, sweeping three consecutive titles in January: the Yonex Thailand Open, the Toyota Thailand Open, and at the 2020 BWF World Tour Finals. Their good performance during the Asian Leg took them to number 2 in the world ranking. Sapsiree made her second Olympic appearance at the rescheduled 2020 Summer Olympics in July, where she and Dechapol fought their way to the quarter-finals.

In October 2021, Sapsiree helped the Thai women's team secure a bronze medal at the Uber Cup in Aarhus. Partnered with Dechapol, they secured a runner-up finish at the Denmark Open, which served as a prelude to a stunning four-tournament winning streak. She first clinched the Hylo Open title in Germany in early November, before heading to the Indonesia Badminton Festival in Bali. There, she and her partner executed a flawless clean sweep of the three-week festival, capturing consecutive titles at the Indonesia Masters, Indonesia Open, and then defend their World Tour Finals title. This relentless run of dominance culminated on 7 December 2021, when Sapsiree and Dechapol officially ascended to the world number 1 spot in the BWF world rankings for the first time in their careers. She capped off her historic season just weeks later at the BWF World Championships in Huelva, Spain, where she captured the elusive gold medal, making them the first-ever Thai mixed doubles pair to be crowned World Champions.

=== 2022–2023: World Championships bronze ===
Throughout 2022, Sapsiree opened her title account by winning the German Open mixed doubles crown alongside Dechapol. This victory was followed by a string of strong performances in Southeast Asia, where she secured consecutive runner-up finishes at the Thailand and Malaysia Open, before bouncing back to claim the Singapore Open title. In August, Sapsiree diversified her achievements by capturing a bronze medal in the women's doubles with Puttita at the BWF World Championships in Tokyo. Immediately following this campaign, she returned to mixed doubles to clinch the Japan Open title. Sapsiree concluded her eventful year at the BWF World Tour Finals in Bangkok, as she and Dechapol finished as the runner-up after a hard-fought defeat in the final match against Zheng Siwei and Huang Yaqiong.

During the 2023 BWF season, Sapsiree, along with her longtime mixed doubles partner Dechapol, maintained a strong presence on the international circuit through several deep tournament runs. The duo secured their title of the year at the Malaysia Masters, bouncing back from a game down to defeat the Chinese pair Feng Yanzhe and Huang Dongping in a grueling 91-minute final. Shortly after her victory in Kuala Lumpur, she reached consecutive finals on home soil at the Thailand Open in June and later at the Japan Open in July. She then suffered an injury in the second round of the French Open. Reflecting her dedication to the sport, Sapsiree became a brand ambassador for Haier and took part in the "Haier Inspire Future Dreams" to nurture young badminton talent in Thailand.

=== 2024–2025: Closing one era, building another ===
In 2024, Sapsiree continued her prominence on the international mixed doubles circuit alongside Dechapol. The pair commenced their year with a strong campaign in January, capturing the India Open title by defeating China's Jiang Zhenbang and Wei Yaxin in straight games. They sustained this momentum into February, clinching a consecutive victory on home soil at the Thailand Masters. In May, she reached another final at the Thailand Open, finishing as a runner-up after a hard-fought match against Guo Xinwa and Chen Fanghui. Later in the year, she qualified for and competed in her third Olympic Games at the 2024 Summer Olympics in Paris, where she and Dechapol advanced through the group stage before bowing out in the quarter-final to the eventual bronze medalists from Japan. However, the Badminton Association of Thailand (BAT) made the decision after the Paris Olympics to "break-up" the successful Thai mixed doubles badminton combination Dechapol and Sapsiree. This change aimed to have them switch partners and potentially start over, though there is a strong focus on both trying to be a world No. 1 again. Sapsiree now forming a new mixed doubles combination with Pakkapon Teeraratsakul.

Throughout 2025, Sapsiree continued to serve as a vital cornerstone for the Thai national badminton program. In February, she contributed to Thailand's bronze-medal finish at the Asia Mixed Team Championships in Qingdao. Later in December, at the 2025 SEA Games in Thailand, she secured a gold medal for the host nation in the women's team; however, her individual campaign in the women's doubles alongside Benyapa Aimsaard concluded with a hard-fought quarter-final exit. On the BWF World Tour, she highlighted her enduring competitive edge in her new mixed doubles partnerships, Pakkapon, capping off her season by reaching the final at the Syed Modi International and concluding the tournament as a runner-up.

== Achievements ==
=== BWF World Championships ===
Women's doubles
Year	Venue	Partner	Opponent	Score	Result	Ref.
2022	Tokyo Metropolitan Gymnasium; Tokyo, Japan	(Thailand) Puttita Supajirakul	(South Korea) Kim So-yeong (South Korea) Kong Hee-yong	16–21, 21–19, 23–25	Bronze	

Mixed doubles
Year	Venue	Partner	Opponent	Score	Result	Ref.
2019	St. Jakobshalle; Basel, Switzerland	(Thailand) Dechapol Puavaranukroh	(China) Zheng Siwei (China) Huang Yaqiong	8–21, 12–21	Silver	
2021	Palacio de los Deportes Carolina Marín; Huelva, Spain	(Thailand) Dechapol Puavaranukroh	(Japan) Yuta Watanabe (Japan) Arisa Higashino	21–13, 21–14	Gold	

=== Asian Championships ===
Mixed doubles
Year	Venue	Partner	Opponent	Score	Result	Ref.
2017	Wuhan Sports Center Gymnasium; Wuhan, China	(Thailand) Dechapol Puavaranukroh	(China) Lu Kai (China) Huang Yaqiong	18–21, 11–21	Silver	
2019	Wuhan Sports Center Gymnasium; Wuhan, China	(Thailand) Dechapol Puavaranukroh	(China) Wang Yilyu (China) Huang Dongping	21–23, 10–21	Bronze	

=== SEA Games ===
Women's doubles
Year	Venue	Partner	Opponent	Score	Result	Ref.
2013	Wunna Theikdi Indoor Stadium; Naypyidaw, Myanmar	(Thailand) Puttita Supajirakul	(Indonesia) Nitya Krishinda Maheswari (Indonesia) Greysia Polii	7–21, 11–21	Bronze	
2017	Axiata Arena; Kuala Lumpur, Malaysia	(Thailand) Puttita Supajirakul	(Thailand) Jongkolphan Kititharakul (Thailand) Rawinda Prajongjai	16–21, 8–7 retired	Silver	

Mixed doubles
Year	Venue	Partner	Opponent	Score	Result	Ref.
2013	Wunna Theikdi Indoor Stadium; Naypyidaw, Myanmar	(Thailand) Maneepong Jongjit	(Indonesia) Muhammad Rijal (Indonesia) Debby Susanto	18–21, 19–21	Silver	
2015	Singapore Indoor Stadium; Singapore	(Thailand) Sudket Prapakamol	(Indonesia) Praveen Jordan (Indonesia) Debby Susanto	13–21, 21–8, 14–21	Bronze	
2017	Axiata Arena; Kuala Lumpur, Malaysia	(Thailand) Dechapol Puavaranukroh	(Malaysia) Goh Soon Huat (Malaysia) Shevon Jemie Lai	21–15, 22–20	Gold	

=== Youth Olympic Games ===
Girls' singles
Year	Venue	Opponent	Score	Result	Ref.
2010	Singapore Indoor Stadium, Singapore	(China) Deng Xuan	21–14, 21–17	Gold	

=== BWF World Junior Championships ===
Girls' doubles
Year	Venue	Partner	Opponent	Score	Result	Ref.
2009	Stadium Sultan Abdul Halim; Alor Setar, Malaysia	(Thailand) Rodjana Chuthabunditkul	(China) Tang Jinhua (China) Xia Huan	7–21, 15–21	Bronze	

=== Asian Junior Championships ===
Girls' singles
Year	Venue	Opponent	Score	Result	Ref.
2010	Stadium Juara, Kuala Lumpur, Malaysia	(China) Suo Di	13–21, 11–21	Silver	

Girls' doubles
Year	Venue	Partner	Opponent	Score	Result	Ref.
2009	Stadium Juara; Kuala Lumpur, Malaysia	(Thailand) Rodjana Chuthabunditkul	(China) Luo Ying (China) Luo Yu	16–21, 10–21	Bronze	

=== BWF World Tour (17 titles, 13 runners-up) ===
The BWF World Tour, which was announced on 19 March 2017 and implemented in 2018, is a series of elite badminton tournaments sanctioned by the Badminton World Federation (BWF). The BWF World Tour is divided into levels of World Tour Finals, Super 1000, Super 750, Super 500, Super 300, and the BWF Tour Super 100.

Women's doubles
Year	Tournament	Level	Partner	Opponent	Score	Result	Ref.
2019	Thailand Masters	Super 300	(Thailand) Puttita Supajirakul	(China) Li Wenmei (China) Zheng Yu	15–21, 21–15, 21–10	(gold) Winner	

Mixed doubles
Year	Tournament	Level	Partner	Opponent	Score	Result	Ref.
2018	Denmark Open	Super 750	(Thailand) Dechapol Puavaranukroh	(China) Zheng Siwei (China) Huang Yaqiong	16–21, 13–21	(silver) Runner-up	
2019	Thailand Masters	Super 300	(Thailand) Dechapol Puavaranukroh	(Malaysia) Chan Peng Soon (Malaysia) Goh Liu Ying	16–21, 15–21	(silver) Runner-up	
2019	Malaysia Masters	Super 500	(Thailand) Dechapol Puavaranukroh	(Japan) Yuta Watanabe (Japan) Arisa Higashino	18–21, 18–21	(silver) Runner-up	
2019	Singapore Open	Super 500	(Thailand) Dechapol Puavaranukroh	(Malaysia) Tan Kian Meng (Malaysia) Lai Pei Jing	21–14, 21–6	(gold) Winner	
2019	Korea Open	Super 500	(Thailand) Dechapol Puavaranukroh	(China) Zheng Siwei (China) Huang Yaqiong	21–14, 21–13	(gold) Winner	
2019	Macau Open	Super 300	(Thailand) Dechapol Puavaranukroh	(Chinese Taipei) Wang Chi-lin (Chinese Taipei) Cheng Chi-ya	21–11, 21–8	(gold) Winner	
2020	All England Open	Super 1000	(Thailand) Dechapol Puavaranukroh	(Indonesia) Praveen Jordan (Indonesia) Melati Daeva Oktavianti	15–21, 21–17, 8–21	(silver) Runner-up	
2020 (I)	Thailand Open	Super 1000	(Thailand) Dechapol Puavaranukroh	(Indonesia) Praveen Jordan (Indonesia) Melati Daeva Oktavianti	21–3, 20–22, 21–18	(gold) Winner	
2020 (II)	Thailand Open	Super 1000	(Thailand) Dechapol Puavaranukroh	(South Korea) Seo Seung-jae (South Korea) Chae Yoo-jung	21–16, 22–20	(gold) Winner	
2020	BWF World Tour Finals	World Tour Finals	(Thailand) Dechapol Puavaranukroh	(South Korea) Seo Seung-jae (South Korea) Chae Yoo-jung	21–18, 8–21, 21–8	(gold) Winner	
2021	Denmark Open	Super 1000	(Thailand) Dechapol Puavaranukroh	(Japan) Yuta Watanabe (Japan) Arisa Higashino	18–21, 9–21	(silver) Runner-up	
2021	Hylo Open	Super 500	(Thailand) Dechapol Puavaranukroh	(Indonesia) Praveen Jordan (Indonesia) Melati Daeva Oktavianti	22–20, 21–14	(gold) Winner	
2021	Indonesia Masters	Super 750	(Thailand) Dechapol Puavaranukroh	(Hong Kong) Tang Chun Man (Hong Kong) Tse Ying Suet	21–11, 21–12	(gold) Winner	
2021	Indonesia Open	Super 1000	(Thailand) Dechapol Puavaranukroh	(Japan) Yuta Watanabe (Japan) Arisa Higashino	21–12, 21–13	(gold) Winner	
2021	BWF World Tour Finals	World Tour Finals	(Thailand) Dechapol Puavaranukroh	(Japan) Yuta Watanabe (Japan) Arisa Higashino	21–19, 21–11	(gold) Winner	
2022	German Open	Super 300	(Thailand) Dechapol Puavaranukroh	(China) Ou Xuanyi (China) Huang Yaqiong	21–11, 21–9	(gold) Winner	
2022	Thailand Open	Super 500	(Thailand) Dechapol Puavaranukroh	(China) Zheng Siwei (China) Huang Yaqiong	12–21, 21–18, 14–21	(silver) Runner-up	
2022	Malaysia Open	Super 750	(Thailand) Dechapol Puavaranukroh	(China) Zheng Siwei (China) Huang Yaqiong	13–21, 18–21	(silver) Runner-up	
2022	Singapore Open	Super 500	(Thailand) Dechapol Puavaranukroh	(China) Wang Yilyu (China) Huang Dongping	21–12, 21–17	(gold) Winner	
2022	Japan Open	Super 750	(Thailand) Dechapol Puavaranukroh	(Japan) Yuta Watanabe (Japan) Arisa Higashino	16–21, 23–21, 21–18	(gold) Winner	
2022	BWF World Tour Finals	World Tour Finals	(Thailand) Dechapol Puavaranukroh	(China) Zheng Siwei (China) Huang Yaqiong	19–21, 21–18, 13–21	(silver) Runner-up	
2023	Malaysia Masters	Super 500	(Thailand) Dechapol Puavaranukroh	(China) Feng Yanzhe (China) Huang Dongping	16–21, 21–13, 21–18	(gold) Winner	
2023	Thailand Open	Super 500	(Thailand) Dechapol Puavaranukroh	(South Korea) Kim Won-ho (South Korea) Jeong Na-eun	21–11, 19–21, 20–22	(silver) Runner-up	
2023	Japan Open	Super 750	(Thailand) Dechapol Puavaranukroh	(Japan) Yuta Watanabe (Japan) Arisa Higashino	21–17, 16–21, 15–21	(silver) Runner-up	
2024	India Open	Super 750	(Thailand) Dechapol Puavaranukroh	(China) Jiang Zhenbang (China) Wei Yaxin	21–16, 21–16	(gold) Winner	
2024	Thailand Masters	Super 300	(Thailand) Dechapol Puavaranukroh	(Malaysia) Chen Tang Jie (Malaysia) Toh Ee Wei	21–12, 21–18	(gold) Winner	
2024	Thailand Open	Super 500	(Thailand) Dechapol Puavaranukroh	(China) Guo Xinwa (China) Chen Fanghui	21–12, 12–21, 18–21	(silver) Runner-up	
2025	Syed Modi International	Super 300	(Thailand) Pakkapon Teeraratsakul	(Indonesia) Dejan Ferdinansyah (Indonesia) Bernadine Wardana	19–21, 16–21	(silver) Runner-up	
2026	Malaysia Masters	Super 500	(Thailand) Pakkapon Teeraratsakul	(China) Gao Jiaxuan (China) Wei Yaxin	13–21, 21–15, 11–21	(silver) Runner-up	

=== BWF Superseries (1 runner-up) ===
The BWF Superseries, which was launched on 14 December 2006 and implemented in 2007, was a series of elite badminton tournaments, sanctioned by the Badminton World Federation (BWF). BWF Superseries levels were Superseries and Superseries Premier. A season of Superseries consisted of twelve tournaments around the world that had been introduced since 2011. Successful players were invited to the Superseries Finals, which were held at the end of each year.

Mixed doubles
Year	Tournament	Partner	Opponent	Score	Result	Ref.
2017	Singapore Open	(Thailand) Dechapol Puavaranukroh	(China) Lu Kai (China) Huang Yaqiong	21–19, 16–21, 11–21	(silver) Runner-up	

BWF Super Series Finals tournament
BWF Super Series Premier tournament
BWF Super Series tournament

=== BWF Grand Prix (4 titles, 9 runners-up) ===
The BWF Grand Prix had two levels, the Grand Prix and Grand Prix Gold. It was a series of badminton tournaments sanctioned by the Badminton World Federation (BWF) and played between 2007 and 2017.

Women's singles
Year	Tournament	Opponent	Score	Result	Ref.
2013	U.S. Open	(Japan) Yuka Kusunose	21–12, 21–13	(gold) Winner	

Women's doubles
Year	Tournament	Partner	Opponent	Score	Result	Ref.
2012	India Grand Prix Gold	(Thailand) Savitree Amitrapai	(Indonesia) Komala Dewi (Indonesia) Jenna Gozali	21–12, 21–6	(gold) Winner	
2013	Australian Open	(Thailand) Savitree Amitrapai	(Indonesia) Vita Marissa (Indonesia) Aprilsasi Putri Lejarsar Variella	19–21, 15–21	(silver) Runner-up	
2014	U.S. Open	(Thailand) Puttita Supajirakul	(Indonesia) Shendy Puspa Irawati (Indonesia) Vita Marissa	15–21, 10–21	(silver) Runner-up	
2015	Mexico City Grand Prix	(Thailand) Puttita Supajirakul	(Japan) Shizuka Matsuo (Japan) Mami Naito	17–21, 21–16, 10–21	(silver) Runner-up	
2016	German Open	(Thailand) Puttita Supajirakul	(China) Huang Yaqiong (China) Tang Jinhua	14–21, 18–21	(silver) Runner-up	
2016	Thailand Open	(Thailand) Puttita Supajirakul	(Japan) Mayu Matsumoto (Japan) Wakana Nagahara	21–12, 21–17	(gold) Winner	
2017	Thailand Masters	(Thailand) Puttita Supajirakul	(China) Chen Qingchen (China) Jia Yifan	16–21, 15–21	(silver) Runner-up	

Mixed doubles
Year	Tournament	Partner	Opponent	Score	Result	Ref.
2014	U.S. Open	(Thailand) Maneepong Jongjit	(Indonesia) Muhammad Rijal (Indonesia) Vita Marissa	16–21, 19–21	(silver) Runner-up	
2016	Syed Modi International	(Thailand) Dechapol Puavaranukroh	(Indonesia) Praveen Jordan (Indonesia) Debby Susanto	25–23, 9–21, 16–21	(silver) Runner-up	
2016	Korea Masters	(Thailand) Dechapol Puavaranukroh	(South Korea) Ko Sung-hyun (South Korea) Kim Ha-na	19–21, 16–21	(silver) Runner-up	
2017	Thailand Masters	(Thailand) Dechapol Puavaranukroh	(China) Zhang Nan (China) Li Yinhui	11–21, 22–20, 13–21	(silver) Runner-up	
2017	Swiss Open	(Thailand) Dechapol Puavaranukroh	(Indonesia) Praveen Jordan (Indonesia) Debby Susanto	21–18, 21–15	(gold) Winner	

BWF Grand Prix Gold tournament
BWF Grand Prix tournament

=== BWF International Challenge/Series (3 titles, 2 runners-up) ===
Women's singles
Year	Tournament	Opponent	Score	Result	Ref.
2009	Malaysia International	(Thailand) Ratchanok Intanon	21–11, 19–21, 22–20	(gold) Winner	
2011	Vietnam International	(Malaysia) Tee Jing Yi	19–21, 15–21	(silver) Runner-up	

Women's doubles
Year	Tournament	Partner	Opponent	Score	Result	Ref.
2009	Smiling Fish International	(Thailand) Porntip Buranaprasertsuk	(India) P. C. Thulasi (India) N. Sikki Reddy	21–19, 21–17	(gold) Winner	
2015	USA International	(Thailand) Puttita Supajirakul	(England) Heather Olver (England) Lauren Smith	21–18, 19–21, 19–21	(silver) Runner-up	
2016	Polish Open	(Thailand) Puttita Supajirakul	(Malaysia) Chow Mei Kuan (Malaysia) Lee Meng Yean	21–7, 21–17	(gold) Winner	

BWF International Challenge tournament
BWF International Series tournament
