= 2016 Japan Super Series =

Tournament details
- Dates: 20 – 25 September 2016
- Level: Super Series
- Total prize money: US$300,000
- Venue: Tokyo Metropolitan Gymnasium
- Location: Tokyo, Japan

Champions
- Men's singles: (Malaysia) Lee Chong Wei
- Women's singles: (China) He Bingjiao
- Men's doubles: (China) Li Junhui (China) Liu Yuchen
- Women's doubles: (Denmark) Christinna Pedersen (Denmark) Kamilla Rytter Juhl
- Mixed doubles: (China) Zheng Siwei (China) Chen Qingchen

The 2016 Japan Super Series was the seventh Superseries tournament of the 2016 BWF Super Series. The tournament took place in Tokyo, Japan from September 20–25, 2016 with a total prize money of $300,000.

== Men's singles ==
=== Seeds ===
1. (Malaysia) Lee Chong Wei (Champion)
2. (Denmark) Viktor Axelsen (quarterfinal)
3. (Denmark) Jan Ø. Jørgensen (Final)
4. (China) Tian Houwei (first round)
5. (Chinese Taipei) Chou Tien-chen (second round)
6. (South Korea) Son Wan-ho (semifinal)
7. (Indonesia) Tommy Sugiarto (first round)
8. (India) Srikanth Kidambi (quarterfinal)

=== Top half ===
First Round
1	(Malaysia) Lee C W	21	21
(Thailand) B Ponsana	14	13
(Denmark) H-K Vittinghus	25	12	14
PFQ	(China) Qiao B	23	21	21
7	(Indonesia) T Sugiarto	15	7
Q4	(China) Shi YQ	21	21
(Hong Kong) Ng K L	9	23	21
(India) B. S Praneeth	21	21	10
4	(China) Tian HW	21	14	12
(Chinese Taipei) Hsu J-h	17	21	21
(South Korea) Jeon H-j	11	14
(Germany) M Zwiebler	21	21
8	(India) S Kidambi	14	21	23
Q3	(India) K Parupalli	21	14	21
(India) A Jayaram	21	23
(Indonesia) S D Kuncoro	19	21

Second Round
1	(Malaysia) Lee C W	21	21
PFQ	(China) Qiao B	8	16
Q4	(China) Shi YQ	10	21	21
(Hong Kong) Ng K L	21	12	15
(Chinese Taipei) Hsu J-h	14	18
(Germany) M Zwiebler	21	21
8	(India) S Kidambi	21	0
(India) A Jayaram	16	0^{r}

Quarterfinals
1	(Malaysia) Lee C W	21	21
Q4	(China) Shi YQ	12	12
(Germany) M Zwiebler	18	21	21
8	(India) S Kidambi	21	14	19

Semifinals
1	(Malaysia) Lee C W	21	21
(Germany) M Zwiebler	14	15

=== Bottom half ===
First Round
Q2	(Thailand) K Phetpradab	21	14	21
(Hong Kong) Hu Y	14	21	19
(Hong Kong) Wei N	11	17
5	(Chinese Taipei) Chou T-c	21	21
(South Korea) Lee D-k	21	21
(France) B Leverdez	13	12
Q1	(Japan) R Takeshita	15	13
3	(Denmark) J Ø. Jørgensen	21	21
(Thailand) T Saensomboonsuk	24	21	22
(South Korea) Lee H-i	26	19	24
(Chinese Taipei) Wang T-w	7	13
6	(South Korea) Son W-h	21	21
(India) H. S. Prannoy	23	19	21
(Malaysia) I Z Zainuddin	21	21	18
(Hong Kong) Wong W K	16	11
2	(Denmark) V Axelsen	21	21

Second Round
Q2	(Thailand) K Phetpradab	13	21	21
5	(Chinese Taipei) Chou T-c	21	15	17
(South Korea) Lee D-k	14	13
3	(Denmark) J Ø. Jørgensen	21	21
(South Korea) Lee H-i	13	8
6	(South Korea) Son W-h	21	21
(India) H. S. Prannoy	16	19
2	(Denmark) V Axelsen	21	21

Quarterfinals
Q2	(Thailand) K Phetpradab	6	16
3	(Denmark) J Ø. Jørgensen	21	21
6	(South Korea) Son W-h	21	21
2	(Denmark) V Axelsen	18	13

Semifinals
3	(Denmark) J Ø. Jørgensen	21	21
6	(South Korea) Son W-h	14	19

=== Finals ===
Semifinals
1	(Malaysia) Lee Chong Wei	21	21
(Germany) Marc Zwiebler	14	15
3	(Denmark) Jan Ø. Jørgensen	21	21
6	(South Korea) Son Wan-ho	14	19

Final
1	(Malaysia) Lee Chong Wei	21	15	21
3	(Denmark) Jan Ø. Jørgensen	18	21	16

== Women's singles ==
=== Seeds ===
1. (Spain) Carolina Marín (withdrawn)
2. (Japan) Nozomi Okuhara (quarterfinal)
3. (Thailand) Ratchanok Intanon (quarterfinal)
4. (Chinese Taipei) Tai Tzu-ying (first round)
5. (India) P.V. Sindhu (withdrawn)
6. (Japan) Akane Yamaguchi (semifinal)
7. (China) Sun Yu (Final)
8. (China) He Bingjiao (Champion)

=== Top half ===
First Round
PFQ	(South Korea) Lee J-m	18	14
(Japan) A Mine	21	21
(Japan) K Imabeppu	21	21
(South Korea) Kim H-m	19	18
PFQ	(Japan) A Ohori	21	21
PFQ	(Austria) E Baldauf	5	7
(Denmark) A T Madsen	9	7
(Hong Kong) Cheung N Y	21	21
3	(Thailand) R Intanon	21	21
(Chinese Taipei) Pai Y-p	16	12
(Japan) M Mitani	21	21
(Thailand) N Jindapol	16	13
8	(China) He BJ	16	21	21
(United States) Zhang BW	21	18	15
(Thailand) P Buranaprasertsuk	21	19	20
Q4	(Japan) N Nidaira	15	21	22

Second Round
(Japan) A Mine	21	21
(Japan) K Imabeppu	16	9
PFQ	(Japan) A Ohori	21	16	21
(Hong Kong) Cheung N Y	17	21	10
3	(Thailand) R Intanon	21	21
(Japan) M Mitani	11	10
8	(China) He BJ	21	21
Q4	(Japan) N Nidaira	19	16

Quarterfinals
(Japan) A Mine	21	17	19
PFQ	(Japan) A Ohori	16	21	21
3	(Thailand) R Intanon	20	21	22
8	(China) He BJ	22	14	24

Semifinals
PFQ	(Japan) A Ohori	17	20
8	(China) He BJ	21	22

=== Bottom half ===
First Round
(Canada) M Li	19	3^{r}
Q3	(Japan) C Hoshi	21	7
Q2	(Japan) S Kawakami	19	16
7	(China) Sun Y	21	21
(Japan) Y Hashimoto	10	8
Q1	(Japan) S Takahashi	21	21
(Japan) S Sato	22	21
4	(Chinese Taipei) Tai T-y	20	14
(Chinese Taipei) Hsu Y-c	19	12
(Bulgaria) L Zetchiri	21	21
(Hong Kong) Yip P Y	13	14
6	(Japan) A Yamaguchi	21	21
(Thailand) B Ongbumrungpan	17	17
(China) Chen YF	21	21
(Denmark) L Kjærsfeldt	13	6
2	(Japan) N Okuhara	21	21

Second Round
Q3	(Japan) C Hoshi	20	9
7	(China) Sun Y	22	21
Q1	(Japan) S Takahashi	21	21
(Japan) S Sato	17	9
(Bulgaria) L Zetchiri	11	13
6	(Japan) A Yamaguchi	21	21
(China) Chen YF	13	16
2	(Japan) N Okuhara	21	21

Quarterfinals
7	(China) Sun Y	21	21
Q1	(Japan) S Takahashi	14	9
6	(Japan) A Yamaguchi	21	23
2	(Japan) N Okuhara	11	21

Semifinals
7	(China) Sun Y	21	21
6	(Japan) A Yamaguchi	17	18

=== Finals ===
Semifinals
PFQ	(Japan) Aya Ohori	17	20
8	(China) He Bingjiao	21	22
7	(China) Sun Yu	21	21
6	(Japan) Akane Yamaguchi	17	18

Final
8	(China) He Bingjiao	21	7	21
7	(China) Sun Yu	14	21	18

== Men's doubles ==
=== Seeds ===
1. (China) Chai Biao / Hong Wei (first round)
2. (Indonesia) Mohammad Ahsan / Hendra Setiawan (semifinal)
3. (Denmark) Mathias Boe / Carsten Mogensen (quarterfinal)
4. (Japan) Hiroyuki Endo / Kenichi Hayakawa (second round)
5. (Malaysia) Goh V Shem / Tan Wee Kiong (second round)
6. (Denmark) Mads Conrad-Petersen / Mads Pieler Kolding (second round)
7. (South Korea) Kim Gi-jung / Ko Sung-hyun (Final)
8. (China) Li Junhui / Liu Yuchen (Champions)

=== Top half ===
First Round
1	(China) Chai B (China) Hong W	17	17
(Germany) M Lamsfuss (Germany) M E Seidel	21	21
(England) M Nottingham (England) H Towler	13	15
(Chinese Taipei) Lee J-h (Chinese Taipei) Lee Y	21	21
7	(South Korea) Kim G-j (South Korea) Ko S-h	22	21	21
(Denmark) K Astrup (Denmark) A S Rasmussen	24	14	17
Q3	(Japan) H Okamura (Japan) M Onodera	18	16
(Japan) K Mitsuhashi (Japan) Y Watanabe	21	21
4	(Japan) H Endo (Japan) K Hayakawa	21	21
(Denmark) M Christiansen (Denmark) D Daugaard	16	19
(Chinese Taipei) Liao M-c (Chinese Taipei) Tseng M-h	15	22	17
(Japan) H Saeki (Japan) R Taohata	21	20	21
6	(Denmark) M Conrad-Petersen (Denmark) M P Kolding	21	21
(Chinese Taipei) Lee S-m (Chinese Taipei) Wu H-l	14	12
(China) Liu XL (China) Lu K	22	19
(Japan) T Kamura (Japan) K Sonoda	24	21

Second Round
(Germany) M Lamsfuss (Germany) M E Seidel	9	22
(Chinese Taipei) Lee J-h (Chinese Taipei) Lee Y	21	24
7	(South Korea) Kim G-j (South Korea) Ko S-h	21	21
(Japan) K Mitsuhashi (Japan) Y Watanabe	17	15
4	(Japan) H Endo (Japan) K Hayakawa	13	23
(Japan) H Saeki (Japan) R Taohata	21	25
6	(Denmark) M Conrad-Petersen (Denmark) M P Kolding	18	18
(Japan) T Kamura (Japan) K Sonoda	21	21

Quarterfinals
(Chinese Taipei) Lee J-h (Chinese Taipei) Lee Y	12	14
7	(South Korea) Kim G-j (South Korea) Ko S-h	21	21
(Japan) H Saeki (Japan) R Taohata	21	15	17
(Japan) T Kamura (Japan) K Sonoda	16	21	21

Semifinals
7	(South Korea) Kim G-j (South Korea) Ko S-h	17	21	21
(Japan) T Kamura (Japan) K Sonoda	21	15	18

=== Bottom half ===
First Round
(Chinese Taipei) Lin C-y (Chinese Taipei) Tsai C-h	18	18
(Japan) T Inoue (Japan) Y Kaneko	21	21
Q2	(China) Liu C (China) Zheng SW	16	21	21
8	(China) Li JH (China) Liu YC	21	13	23
(Japan) T Hoki (Japan) Y Kobayashi	21	21
(Scotland) A Hall (England) P Mills	14	17
Q4	(Japan) K Makino (Japan) D Watanabe	13	17
3	(Denmark) M Boe (Denmark) C Mogensen	21	21
(Thailand) D Puavaranukroh (Thailand) K Kedren	19	19
(China) Huang KX (China) Wang YL	21	21
(Thailand) B Issara (Thailand) N Puangpuapech	12	7
5	(Malaysia) Goh V S (Malaysia) Tan W K	21	21
(Chinese Taipei) Chen H-l (Chinese Taipei) Wang C-l	21	15	21
Q1	(South Korea) Chung E-s (South Korea) Kim D-y	18	21	10
(England) P Briggs (England) T Wolfenden	27	13	22
2	(Indonesia) M Ahsan (Indonesia) H Setiawan	25	21	24

Second Round
(Japan) T Inoue (Japan) Y Kaneko	21	18	9
8	(China) Li JH (China) Liu YC	15	21	21
(Japan) T Hoki (Japan) Y Kobayashi	21	16	12
3	(Denmark) M Boe (Denmark) C Mogensen	18	21	21
(China) Huang KX (China) Wang YL	23	21
5	(Malaysia) Goh V S (Malaysia) Tan W K	21	12
(Chinese Taipei) Chen H-l (Chinese Taipei) Wang C-l	11	21	17
2	(Indonesia) M Ahsan (Indonesia) H Setiawan	21	16	21

Quarterfinals
8	(China) Li JH (China) Liu YC	21	21
3	(Denmark) M Boe (Denmark) C Mogensen	17	18
(China) Huang KX (China) Wang YL	18	15
2	(Indonesia) M Ahsan (Indonesia) H Setiawan	21	21

Semifinals
8	(China) Li JH (China) Liu YC	21	18	21
2	(Indonesia) M Ahsan (Indonesia) H Setiawan	13	21	15

=== Finals ===
Semifinals
7	(South Korea) Kim Gi-jung (South Korea) Ko Sung-hyun	17	21	21
(Japan) Takeshi Kamura (Japan) Keigo Sonoda	21	15	18
8	(China) Li Junhui (China) Liu Yuchen	21	18	21
2	(Indonesia) Mohammad Ahsan (Indonesia) Hendra Setiawan	13	21	15

Final
7	(South Korea) Kim Gi-jung (South Korea) Ko Sung-hyun	12	12
8	(China) Li Junhui (China) Liu Yuchen	21	21

== Women's doubles ==
=== Seeds ===
1. (Japan) Misaki Matsutomo / Ayaka Takahashi (Final)
2. (Denmark) Christinna Pedersen / Kamilla Rytter Juhl (Champions)
3. (China) Luo Ying / Luo Yu (semifinal)
4. (Japan) Naoko Fukuman / Kurumi Yonao (first round)
5. (Netherlands) Eefje Muskens / Selena Piek (second round)
6. (Japan) Shizuka Matsuo / Mami Naito (quarterfinal)
7. (China) Huang Yaqiong / Tang Jinhua (withdrawn)
8. (Malaysia) Vivian Hoo Kah Mun / Woon Khe Wei (quarterfinal)

=== Top half ===
First Round
(Japan) M Kawashima (Japan) N Uesugi	19	15
(Chinese Taipei) Chiang K-h (Chinese Taipei) Hung S-h	21	21
5	(Netherlands) E Muskens (Netherlands) S Piek	w	/	o
(Germany) L Efler (Germany) I Herttrich
(Thailand) J Kititharakul (Thailand) R Prajongjai	21	17	21
(Japan) A Sakuramoto (Japan) Y Takahata	19	21	18
4	(Japan) N Fukuman (Japan) K Yonao	15	13
(China) Ou DN (China) Yu XH	21	21
(Japan) M Aratama (Japan) A Watanabe	13	21	11
(Thailand) P Supajirakul (Thailand) S Taerattanachai	21	19	21
7	(China) Huang YQ (China) Tang JH
(Japan) R Kawashima (Japan) S Ozaki	w	/	o
(Japan) S Tanaka (Japan) K Yonemoto	21	21
(South Korea) Lee S-h (South Korea) Shin S-c	17	9

Second Round
1	(Japan) M Matsutomo (Japan) A Takahashi	21	21
(Chinese Taipei) Chiang K-h (Chinese Taipei) Hung S-h	7	15
5	(Netherlands) E Muskens (Netherlands) S Piek	18	14
(Thailand) J Kititharakul (Thailand) R Prajongjai	21	21
(China) Ou DN (China) Yu XH	13	16
(Thailand) P Supajirakul (Thailand) S Taerattanachai	21	21
(Japan) R Kawashima (Japan) S Ozaki	16	15
(Japan) S Tanaka (Japan) K Yonemoto	21	21

Quarterfinals
1	(Japan) M Matsutomo (Japan) A Takahashi	21	21
(Thailand) J Kititharakul (Thailand) R Prajongjai	11	8
(Thailand) P Supajirakul (Thailand) S Taerattanachai	21	15	19
(Japan) S Tanaka (Japan) K Yonemoto	16	21	21

Semifinals
1	(Japan) M Matsutomo (Japan) A Takahashi	21	21
(Japan) S Tanaka (Japan) K Yonemoto	14	19

=== Bottom half ===
First Round
(South Korea) Kim H-r (South Korea) Yoo H-w	21	19	21
(Japan) K Asumi (Japan) M Yokoyama	19	21	12
(Germany) J Goliszewski (Germany) L Kaepplein	14	6
6	(Japan) S Matsuo (Japan) M Naito	21	21
(England) J Pugh (England) E Westwood	12	7
(Denmark) M Freurgaard (Denmark) S Thygesen	21	21
(Japan) S Hobara (Japan) N Matsuyama	11	17
3	(China) Luo Y (China) Luo Y	21	21
(China) Chen QC (China) Tang YT
(Japan) M Kashihara (Japan) M Kato	w	/	o
(Japan) M Matsumoto (Japan) W Nagahara	19	12
8	(Malaysia) Vivian Hoo K M (Malaysia) Woon K W	21	21
(Bulgaria) G Stoeva (Bulgaria) S Stoeva	17	13
(Japan) Y Fukushima (Japan) S Hirota	21	21
(Japan) R Etoh (Japan) A Matsuda	13	13
2	(Denmark) C Pedersen (Denmark) K Rytter Juhl	21	21

Second Round
(South Korea) Kim H-r (South Korea) Yoo H-w	13	13
6	(Japan) S Matsuo (Japan) M Naito	21	21
(Denmark) M Freurgaard (Denmark) S Thygesen	13	15
3	(China) Luo Y (China) Luo Y	21	21
(Japan) M Kashihara (Japan) M Kato	21	16	17
8	(Malaysia) Vivian Hoo K M (Malaysia) Woon K W	19	21	21
(Japan) Y Fukushima (Japan) S Hirota	16	15
2	(Denmark) C Pedersen (Denmark) K Rytter Juhl	21	21

Quarterfinals
6	(Japan) S Matsuo (Japan) M Naito	18	10
3	(China) Luo Y (China) Luo Y	21	21
8	(Malaysia) Vivian Hoo K M (Malaysia) Woon K W	22	21	14
2	(Denmark) C Pedersen (Denmark) K Rytter Juhl	20	23	21

Semifinals
3	(China) Luo Y (China) Luo Y	23	16	17
2	(Denmark) C Pedersen (Denmark) K Rytter Juhl	21	21	21

=== Finals ===
Semifinals
1	(Japan) Misaki Matsutomo (Japan) Ayaka Takahashi	21	21
(Japan) Shiho Tanaka (Japan) Koharu Yonemoto	14	19
3	(China) Luo Ying (China) Luo Yu	23	16	17
2	(Denmark) Christinna Pedersen (Denmark) Kamilla Rytter Juhl	21	21	21

Final
1	(Japan) Misaki Matsutomo (Japan) Ayaka Takahashi	21	18	12
2	(Denmark) Christinna Pedersen (Denmark) Kamilla Rytter Juhl	19	21	21

== Mixed doubles ==
=== Seeds ===
1. (South Korea) Ko Sung-hyun / Kim Ha-na (Final)
2. (Indonesia) Praveen Jordan / Debby Susanto (withdrawn)
3. (Denmark) Joachim Fischer Nielsen / Christinna Pedersen (quarterfinal)
4. (England) Chris Adcock / Gabrielle Adcock (first round)
5. (Malaysia) Chan Peng Soon / Goh Liu Ying (semifinal)
6. (China) Lu Kai / Huang Yaqiong (semifinal)
7. (China) Zheng Siwei / Chen Qingchen (Champions)
8. (China) Liu Yuchen / Tang Jinhua (withdrawn)

=== Top half ===
First Round
1	(South Korea) Ko S-h (South Korea) Kim H-n	21	21
(Denmark) A S Rasmussen (Denmark) S Thygesen	17	9
(Japan) Y Kaneko (Japan) K Yonemoto	21	21
Q4	(Japan) K Ito (Japan) N Uratani	7	19
PFQ	(China) Huang KX (China) Yu XH	21	21
(Japan) Y Kobayashi (Japan) W Nagahara	19	14
Q1	(Japan) Y Takeuchi (Japan) Y Takahata	12	15
Q2	(Thailand) N Puangpuapech (Thailand) J Kititharakul	21	21
4	(England) C Adcock (England) G Adcock	20	18
(South Korea) Kim G-j (South Korea) Shin S-c	22	21
(Japan) K Kazuno (Japan) A Kurihara	w	/	o
(Austria) D Obernosterer (Austria) E Baldauf
5	(Malaysia) Chan P S (Malaysia) Goh L Y	21	21
(England) M Nottingham (England) E Westwood	13	15
(Netherlands) J Arends (Netherlands) S Piek	21	21
(Denmark) K Astrup (Denmark) L Kjaersfeldt	13	18

Second Round
1	(South Korea) Ko S-h (South Korea) Kim H-n	21	21
(Japan) Y Kaneko (Japan) K Yonemoto	15	16
PFQ	(China) Huang KX (China) Yu XH	13	21	16
Q2	(Thailand) N Puangpuapech (Thailand) J Kititharakul	21	18	21
(South Korea) Kim G-j (South Korea) Shin S-c	21	21
(Japan) K Kazuno (Japan) A Kurihara	13	15
5	(Malaysia) Chan P S (Malaysia) Goh L Y	21	21
(Netherlands) J Arends (Netherlands) S Piek	13	19

Quarterfinals
1	(South Korea) Ko S-h (South Korea) Kim H-n	21	21
Q2	(Thailand) N Puangpuapech (Thailand) J Kititharakul	12	8
(South Korea) Kim G-j (South Korea) Shin S-c	17	18
5	(Malaysia) Chan P S (Malaysia) Goh L Y	21	21

Semifinals
1	(South Korea) Ko S-h (South Korea) Kim H-n	21	21
5	(Malaysia) Chan P S (Malaysia) Goh L Y	14	18

=== Bottom half ===
First Round
(Thailand) B Issara (Thailand) S Amitrapai	14	21	12
(Japan) Y Watanabe (Japan) A Higashino	21	16	21
Q3	(Japan) T Takashina (Japan) R Etoh	22	4	11
6	(China) Lu K (China) Huang YQ	20	21	21
(Chinese Taipei) Liao M-c (Chinese Taipei) Chen H-h	21	21
(Germany) M Lamsfuss (Germany) I Herttrich	14	11
(Germany) M E Seidel (Germany) L Efler	11	17^{r}
3	(Denmark) J Fischer Nielsen (Denmark) C Pedersen	21	19
PFQ	(Denmark) S Gravholt (Denmark) M Fruergaard	21	21	21
(South Korea) Chung E-s (South Korea) Yoo H-w	18	23	15
(England) B Lane (England) J Pugh	21	12	7
7	(China) Zheng SW (China) Chen QC	19	21	21
(Thailand) D Puavaranukroh (Thailand) S Taerattanachai	21	18	21
(Japan) R Taohata (Japan) S Matsuo	19	21	18
(Hong Kong) Lee C H (Hong Kong) Chau H W	21	21
PFQ	(South Korea) Kim D-y (South Korea) Kim H-r	16	13

Second Round
(Japan) Y Watanabe (Japan) A Higashino	17	15
6	(China) Lu K (China) Huang YQ	21	21
(Chinese Taipei) Liao M-c (Chinese Taipei) Chen H-h	21	8	14
3	(Denmark) J Fischer Nielsen (Denmark) C Pedersen	11	21	21
PFQ	(Denmark) S Gravholt (Denmark) M Fruergaard	18	13
7	(China) Zheng SW (China) Chen QC	21	21
(Thailand) D Puavaranukroh (Thailand) S Taerattanachai	21	21	21
(Hong Kong) Lee C H (Hong Kong) Chau H W	16	23	12

Quarterfinals
6	(China) Lu K (China) Huang YQ	21	21
3	(Denmark) J Fischer Nielsen (Denmark) C Pedersen	18	16
7	(China) Zheng SW (China) Chen QC	21	17	23
(Thailand) D Puavaranukroh (Thailand) S Taerattanachai	13	21	21

Semifinals
6	(China) Lu K (China) Huang YQ	11	19
7	(China) Zheng SW (China) Chen QC	21	21

=== Finals ===
Semifinals
1	(South Korea) Ko Sung-hyun (South Korea) Kim Ha-na	21	21
5	(Malaysia) Chan Peng Soon (Malaysia) Goh Liu Ying	14	18
6	(China) Lu Kai (China) Huang Yaqiong	11	19
7	(China) Zheng Siwei (China) Chen Qingchen	21	21

Final
1	(South Korea) Ko Sung-hyun (South Korea) Kim Ha-na	10	15
7	(China) Zheng Siwei (China) Chen Qingchen	21	21

Preceded by 2015 Japan Super Series	Japan Open	Succeeded by 2017 Japan Super Series
Preceded by 2016 Australian Super Series	BWF Super Series; 2016 BWF Season	Succeeded by 2016 Korea Open Super Series
