= 2016 Hong Kong Super Series =

Tournament details
- Dates: 22 – 27 November 2016
- Level: Super Series
- Total prize money: US$400,000
- Venue: Hong Kong Coliseum
- Location: Kowloon, Hong Kong

Champions
- Men's singles: (Hong Kong) Ng Ka Long
- Women's singles: (Chinese Taipei) Tai Tzu-ying
- Men's doubles: (Japan) Takeshi Kamura (Japan) Keigo Sonoda
- Women's doubles: (Denmark) Kamilla Rytter Juhl (Denmark) Christinna Pedersen
- Mixed doubles: (Indonesia) Tontowi Ahmad (Indonesia) Liliyana Natsir

The 2016 Hong Kong Super Series was the twelfth Superseries tournament of the 2016 BWF Super Series. The tournament took place in Kowloon, Hong Kong from November 22–27, 2016 with a total prize money of $400,000.

== Men's singles ==
=== Seeds ===
1. (Malaysia) Lee Chong Wei (withdrew)
2. (China) Chen Long (withdrew)
3. (Denmark) Jan Ø. Jørgensen (semifinals)
4. (South Korea) Son Wan-ho (second round)
5. (China) Tian Houwei (first round)
6. (Chinese Taipei) Chou Tien-chen (first round)
7. (Thailand) Tanongsak Saensomboonsuk (first round)
8. (England) Rajiv Ouseph (second round)

=== Top half ===
First Round
PFQ	(Japan) K Sakai	15	21	21
(China) Shi YQ	21	18	14
Q2	(Japan) T Ueda	20	18
PFQ	(India) S Verma	22	21
7	(Thailand) T Saensomboonsuk	21	19	11
PFQ	(Malaysia) Chong W F	18	21	21
(China) Qiao B	16	18
(India) H. S. Prannoy	21	21
3	(Denmark) J Ø Jørgensen	21	21
PFQ	(India) B S Praneeth	18	18
(Hong Kong) Wei N	21	21
(Chinese Taipei) Wang T-w	17	18
8	(England) R Ouseph	21	15	21
Q4	(Japan) R Takeshita	13	21	16
Q1	(Chinese Taipei) Lin Y-h	10	13
(Hong Kong) Wong W K	21	21

Second Round
PFQ	(Japan) K Sakai	21	15	11
PFQ	(India) S Verma	19	21	21
PFQ	(Malaysia) Chong W F	15	21	21
(India) H. S. Prannoy	21	11	15
3	(Denmark) J Ø Jørgensen	19	21	24
(Hong Kong) Wei N	21	13	22
8	(England) R Ouseph	23	21	11
(Hong Kong) Wong W K	25	14	21

Quarterfinals
PFQ	(India) S Verma	21	23
PFQ	(Malaysia) Chong W F	17	21
3	(Denmark) J Ø Jørgensen	21	21
(Hong Kong) Wong W K	19	17

Semifinals
PFQ	(India) S Verma	21	24
3	(Denmark) J Ø Jørgensen	19	22

=== Bottom half ===
First Round
(South Korea) Lee H-i	21	16	17
(Indonesia) S D Kuncoro	14	21	21
(Thailand) B Ponsana	21	16	21
6	(Chinese Taipei) Chou T-c	19	21	18
(Germany) M Zwiebler	16	19
(Hong Kong) Hu Y	21	21
(Malaysia) I Z Zainuddin	11	21	15
4	(South Korea) Son W-h	21	19	21
(Hong Kong) Ng K L	21	20	17
(Malaysia) Z Zulkiffli	17	22	12^{r}
Q3	(Hong Kong) Lee C Y	22	21
5	(China) Tian HW	20	19
(China) Huang YX	21	21
PFQ	(Indonesia) I M Mustofa	11	15
(India) A Jayaram	21	13	21
PFQ	(Indonesia) A S Ginting	15	21	16

Second Round
(Indonesia) S D Kuncoro	21	21
(Thailand) B Ponsana	19	16
(Hong Kong) Hu Y	21	6	21
4	(South Korea) Son W-h	17	21	16
(Hong Kong) Ng K L	21	21
Q3	(Hong Kong) Lee C Y	12	16
(China) Huang YX	18	19
(India) A Jayaram	21	21

Quarterfinals
(Indonesia) S D Kuncoro	20	12
(Hong Kong) Hu Y	22	21
(Hong Kong) Ng K L	21	21
(India) A Jayaram	15	14

Semifinals
(Hong Kong) Hu Y	19	7
(Hong Kong) Ng K L	21	21

=== Finals ===
Semifinals
PFQ	(India) Sameer Verma	21	24
3	(Denmark) Jan Ø. Jørgensen	19	22
(Hong Kong) Hu Yun	19	7
(Hong Kong) Ng Ka Long	21	21

Final
PFQ	(India) Sameer Verma	14	21	11
(Hong Kong) Ng Ka Long	21	10	21

== Women's singles ==
=== Seeds ===
1. (Spain) Carolina Marín (semifinals)
2. (Thailand) Ratchanok Intanon (withdrew)
3. (Japan) Nozomi Okuhara (withdrew)
4. (Chinese Taipei) Tai Tzu-ying (champion)
5. (India) Saina Nehwal (quarterfinals)
6. (Japan) Akane Yamaguchi (quarterfinals)
7. (South Korea) Sung Ji-hyun (first round)
8. (China) Sun Yu (withdrew)

=== Top half ===
First Round
1	(Spain) C Marín	21	21
(Thailand) B Ongbamrungphan	8	14
(Denmark) L Kjaersfeldt	12	17
(Hong Kong) Yip P Y	21	21
6	(Japan) A Yamaguchi	21	21
(Spain) B Corrales	8	13
(Egypt) H Hosny	21	17	17
Q2	(Indonesia) D R Vehrenica	13	21	21
4	(Chinese Taipei) Tai T-y	21	17	21
(Japan) M Mitani	11	21	10
Q1	(Indonesia) J Muljati	10	19
(Indonesia) L A Mainaky	21	21
PFQ	(Indonesia) R A Riodingin
(Bulgaria) L Zetchiri	w	/	o
(Chinese Taipei) Lee C-h	21	12	14
(Japan) A Ohori	18	21	21

Second Round
1	(Spain) C Marín	21	21
(Hong Kong) Yip P Y	18	16
6	(Japan) A Yamaguchi	21	21
Q2	(Indonesia) D R Vehrenica	11	10
4	(Chinese Taipei) Tai T-y	17	21	21
(Indonesia) L A Mainaky	21	5	13
(Bulgaria) L Zetchiri	17	21	13
(Japan) A Ohori	21	11	21

Quarterfinals
1	(Spain) C Marín	21	21
6	(Japan) A Yamaguchi	7	18
4	(Chinese Taipei) Tai T-y	21	21
(Japan) A Ohori	9	14

Semifinals
1	(Spain) C Marín	17	21	16
4	(Chinese Taipei) Tai T-y	21	14	21

=== Bottom half ===
First Round
(Chinese Taipei) Chiang M-h	12	14
(Japan) S Sato	21	21
(Thailand) P Buranaprasertsuk	21	19	17
5	(India) S Nehwal	12	21	21
(Thailand) N Jindapol	21	21
Q3	(Chinese Taipei) Tang W-y	9	11
(Hong Kong) Cheung N Y	21	21
PFQ	(Vietnam) Nguyen T L	14	12
(India) P.V. Sindhu	21	21
PFQ	(Indonesia) Y Y Susanto	13	16
(Chinese Taipei) Hsu Y-c	20	21	21
7	(South Korea) Sung J-h	22	14	19
Q4	(Hong Kong) Yeung S Y	17	22	21
PFQ	(Hong Kong) Cheung Y M	21	20	13
(Singapore) Liang XY	21	21
PFQ	(Chinese Taipei) Chen S-y	15	11

Second Round
(Japan) S Sato	18	21	16
5	(India) S Nehwal	21	9	21
(Thailand) N Jindapol	21	18	7
(Hong Kong) Cheung N Y	6	21	21
(India) P.V. Sindhu	21	21
(Chinese Taipei) Hsu Y-c	10	14
Q4	(Hong Kong) Yeung S Y	9	12
(Singapore) Liang XY	21	21

Quarterfinals
5	(India) S Nehwal	8	21	19
(Hong Kong) Cheung N Y	21	18	21
(India) P.V. Sindhu	21	21	21
(Singapore) Liang XY	17	23	18

Semifinals
(Hong Kong) Cheung N Y	14	16
(India) P.V. Sindhu	21	21

=== Finals ===
Semifinals
1	(Spain) Carolina Marín	17	21	16
4	(Chinese Taipei) Tai Tzu-ying	21	14	21
(Hong Kong) Cheung Ngan Yi	14	16
(India) P.V. Sindhu	21	21

Final
4	(Chinese Taipei) Tai Tzu-ying	21	21
(India) P.V. Sindhu	15	17

== Men's doubles ==
=== Seeds ===
1. (Malaysia) Goh V Shem / Tan Wee Kiong (quarterfinals)
2. (China) Chai Biao / Hong Wei (semifinals)
3. (China) Li Junhui / Liu Yuchen (first round)
4. (Denmark) Mathias Boe / Carsten Mogensen (final)
5. (Denmark) Mads Conrad-Petersen / Mads Pieler Kolding (first round)
6. (Indonesia) Markus Fernaldi Gideon / Kevin Sanjaya Sukamuljo (first round)
7. (Russia) Vladimir Ivanov / Ivan Sozonov (first round)
8. (Indonesia) Angga Pratama / Ricky Karanda Suwardi (second round)

=== Top half ===
First Round
1	(Malaysia) Goh V S (Malaysia) Tan W K	21	21
(Denmark) K Astrup (Denmark) A S Rasmussen	14	15
(Indonesia) B Angriawan (Indonesia) H Setiawan	16	21	10
(China) Liu C (China) Zhan N	21	10	21
8	(Indonesia) A Pratama (Indonesia) R K Suwardi	13	22	21
(Chinese Taipei) Lee J-h (Chinese Taipei) Lee Y	21	20	16
(Indonesia) M Ahsan (Indonesia) R A Saputro	21	21
(Thailand) K Kedren (Thailand) D Puavaranukroh	17	16
4	(Denmark) M Boe (Denmark) C Mogensen	22	16	21
(Chinese Taipei) Chen H-l (Chinese Taipei) Wang C-l	20	21	19
PFQ	(Indonesia) H A Gunawan (Indonesia) M Kido	21	19	21
(Chinese Taipei) Lee S-m (Chinese Taipei) Lin C-y	19	21	14
5	(Denmark) M Conrad-Petersen (Denmark) M P Kolding	19	24	18
Q4	(Malaysia) Ong Y S (Malaysia) Teo E Y	21	22	21
(South Korea) Kim J-h (South Korea) Yoo Y-s	21	21
(Malaysia) Koo K K (Malaysia) Tan B H	19	18

Second Round
1	(Malaysia) Goh V S (Malaysia) Tan W K	19	21	21
(China) Liu C (China) Zhan N	21	17	16
8	(Indonesia) A Pratama (Indonesia) R K Suwardi	18	16
(Indonesia) M Ahsan (Indonesia) R A Saputro	21	21
4	(Denmark) M Boe (Denmark) C Mogensen	21	21
PFQ	(Indonesia) H A Gunawan (Indonesia) M Kido	6	7
Q4	(Malaysia) Ong Y S (Malaysia) Teo E Y	11	21	21
(South Korea) Kim J-h (South Korea) Yoo Y-s	21	10	18

Quarterfinals
1	(Malaysia) Goh V S (Malaysia) Tan W K	11	21	17
(Indonesia) M Ahsan (Indonesia) R A Saputro	21	17	21
4	(Denmark) M Boe (Denmark) C Mogensen	21	18	21
Q4	(Malaysia) Ong Y S (Malaysia) Teo E Y	14	21	13

Semifinals
(Indonesia) M Ahsan (Indonesia) R A Saputro	18	11
4	(Denmark) M Boe (Denmark) C Mogensen	21	21

=== Bottom half ===
First Round
(Japan) T Kamura (Japan) K Sonoda	21	21
(Hong Kong) Or C C (Hong Kong) Tang C M	17	8
Q3	(China) Lu K (China) Zheng SW	21	16	21
6	(Indonesia) M F Gideon (Indonesia) K S Sukamuljo	13	21	16
(South Korea) Choi S-g (South Korea) Ko S-h	21	21
(India) M Attri (India) B S Reddy	15	8
(Japan) H Endo (Japan) Y Watanabe	27	21
3	(China) Li JH (China) Liu YC	25	17
Q2	(Hong Kong) Law C H (Hong Kong) Lee C H	21	9
(Thailand) B Issara (Thailand) N Puangpuapech	17	7^{r}
(Malaysia) Lim K W (Malaysia) Ong J G	23	21
7	(Russia) V Ivanov (Russia) I Sozonov	21	11
Q1	(Hong Kong) Chan T K (Hong Kong) Chang T C	12	11
(Japan) T Hoki (Japan) Y Kobayashi	21	21
(England) M Ellis (England) C Langridge	12	21	17
2	(China) Chai B (China) Hong W	21	19	21

Second Round
(Japan) T Kamura (Japan) K Sonoda	21	21	21
Q3	(China) Lu K (China) Zheng SW	18	23	15
(South Korea) Choi S-g (South Korea) Ko S-h	21	21
(Japan) H Endo (Japan) Y Watanabe	19	13
Q2	(Hong Kong) Law C H (Hong Kong) Lee C H	21	18	21
(Malaysia) Lim K W (Malaysia) Ong J G	14	21	13
(Japan) T Hoki (Japan) Y Kobayashi	14	12
2	(China) Chai B (China) Hong W	21	21

Quarterfinals
(Japan) T Kamura (Japan) K Sonoda	21	21
(South Korea) Choi S-g (South Korea) Ko S-h	18	10
Q2	(Hong Kong) Law C H (Hong Kong) Lee C H	17	13
2	(China) Chai B (China) Hong W	21	21

Semifinals
(Japan) T Kamura (Japan) K Sonoda	21	19	21
2	(China) Chai B (China) Hong W	15	21	17

=== Finals ===
Semifinals
(Indonesia) Mohammad Ahsan (Indonesia) Rian Agung Saputro	18	11
4	(Denmark) Mathias Boe (Denmark) Carsten Mogensen	21	21
(Japan) Takeshi Kamura (Japan) Keigo Sonoda	21	19	21
2	(China) Chai Biao (China) Hong Wei	15	21	17

Final
4	(Denmark) Mathias Boe (Denmark) Carsten Mogensen	19	19
(Japan) Takeshi Kamura (Japan) Keigo Sonoda	21	21

== Women's doubles ==
=== Seeds ===
1. (Japan) Misaki Matsutomo / Ayaka Takahashi (quarterfinals)
2. (South Korea) Jung Kyung-eun / Shin Seung-chan (quarterfinals)
3. (Denmark) Kamilla Rytter Juhl / Christinna Pedersen (champion)
4. (China) Luo Ying / Luo Yu (second round)
5. (Indonesia) Nitya Krishinda Maheswari / Greysia Polii (withdrew)
6. (South Korea) Chang Ye-na / Lee So-hee (quarterfinals)
7. (Japan) Naoko Fukuman / Kurumi Yonao (second round)
8. (Japan) Shizuka Matsuo / Mami Naito (second round)

=== Top half ===
First Round
1	(Japan) M Matsutomo (Japan) A Takahashi	21	21
(Bulgaria) G Stoeva (Bulgaria) S Stoeva	16	11
(Hong Kong) Poon L Y (Hong Kong) Tse Y S	21	5	19
(Indonesia) A S Awanda (Indonesia) N K M Istirani	18	21	21
8	(Japan) S Matsuo (Japan) M Naito	21	21
(Indonesia) C S Ayunidha (Indonesia) N Indriani	6	4
(China) Bao YX (China) Yu XH	12	21	21
(Malaysia) Chow M K (Malaysia) Lee M Y	21	16	18
3	(Denmark) K Rytter Juhl (Denmark) C Pedersen	21	21
(Indonesia) N Herloardjo (Indonesia) R S Putri	7	8
(Malaysia) Vivian Hoo K M (Malaysia) Woon K W	21	21
Q4	(Hong Kong) Leung S L (Hong Kong) Wu Y T	11	12
PFQ	(Chinese Taipei) Lin X-m (Chinese Taipei) Wu F-c	13	18
(Thailand) J Kititharakul (Thailand) R Prajongjai	21	21
Q1	(Hong Kong) Leung Y Y (Hong Kong) Yeung P L	13	8
(Thailand) P Supajirakul (Thailand) S Taerattanachai	21	21

Second Round
1	(Japan) M Matsutomo (Japan) A Takahashi	21	21
(Indonesia) A S Awanda (Indonesia) N K M Istirani	19	11
8	(Japan) S Matsuo (Japan) M Naito	21	18	19
(China) Bao YX (China) Yu XH	11	21	21
3	(Denmark) K Rytter Juhl (Denmark) C Pedersen	10	21	21
(Malaysia) Vivian Hoo K M (Malaysia) Woon K W	21	11	9
(Thailand) J Kititharakul (Thailand) R Prajongjai	20	22	21
(Thailand) P Supajirakul (Thailand) S Taerattanachai	22	20	12

Quarterfinals
1	(Japan) M Matsutomo (Japan) A Takahashi	17	21	15
(China) Bao YX (China) Yu XH	21	14	21
3	(Denmark) K Rytter Juhl (Denmark) C Pedersen	19	21	21
(Thailand) J Kititharakul (Thailand) R Prajongjai	21	16	18

Semifinals
(China) Bao YX (China) Yu XH	13	11
3	(Denmark) K Rytter Juhl (Denmark) C Pedersen	21	21

=== Bottom half ===
First Round
PFQ	(Indonesia) A M Khasanah (Indonesia) F A Nawangwulan	10	6
(Indonesia) D D Haris (Indonesia) R E Putri Sari	21	21
(Indonesia) T R Nuraidah (Indonesia) R A Pradipta	19	8
6	(South Korea) Chang Y-n (South Korea) Lee S-h	21	21
(China) Chen QC (China) Jia YF	21	21
(Japan) S Tanaka (Japan) K Yonemoto	17	14
Q3	(Hong Kong) Ng W Y (Hong Kong) Yuen S Y	7	14
4	(China) Luo Y (China) Luo Y	21	21
(China) Huang DP (China) Li YH	21	20	21
(Chinese Taipei) Chiang K-h (Chinese Taipei) Hung S-h	16	22	17
(Chinese Taipei) Hsu Y-c (Chinese Taipei) Wu T-j	16	23	20
7	(Japan) N Fukuman (Japan) K Yonao	21	21	22
Q2	(Japan) A Higashino (Japan) A Kurihara	21	21
(Chinese Taipei) Chen S-y (Chinese Taipei) Kuo Y-w	16	11
(Hong Kong) Ng T Y (Hong Kong) Yeung N T	21	17	12
2	(South Korea) Jung K-e (South Korea) Shin S-c	17	21	21

Second Round
(Indonesia) D D Haris (Indonesia) R E Putri Sari	18	16
6	(South Korea) Chang Y-n (South Korea) Lee S-h	21	21
(China) Chen QC (China) Jia YF	21	18	21
4	(China) Luo Y (China) Luo Y	14	21	16
(China) Huang DP (China) Li YH	21	21
7	(Japan) N Fukuman (Japan) K Yonao	15	16
Q2	(Japan) A Higashino (Japan) A Kurihara	20	18
2	(South Korea) Jung K-e (South Korea) Shin S-c	22	21

Quarterfinals
6	(South Korea) Chang Y-n (South Korea) Lee S-h	19	13
(China) Chen QC (China) Jia YF	21	21
(China) Huang DP (China) Li YH	8	21	21
2	(South Korea) Jung K-e (South Korea) Shin S-c	21	16	17

Semifinals
(China) Chen QC (China) Jia YF	18	20
(China) Huang DP (China) Li YH	21	22

=== Finals ===
Semifinals
(China) Bao Yixin (China) Yu Xiaohan	13	11
3	(Denmark) Kamilla Rytter Juhl (Denmark) Christinna Pedersen	21	21
(China) Chen Qingchen (China) Jia Yifan	18	20
(China) Huang Dongping (China) Li Yinhui	21	22

Final
3	(Denmark) Kamilla Rytter Juhl (Denmark) Christinna Pedersen	21	21
(China) Huang Dongping (China) Li Yinhui	19	10

== Mixed doubles ==
=== Seeds ===
1. (South Korea) Ko Sung-hyun / Kim Ha-na (first round)
2. (Indonesia) Praveen Jordan / Debby Susanto (final)
3. (Denmark) Joachim Fischer Nielsen / Christinna Pedersen (withdrew)
4. (Malaysia) Chan Peng Soon / Goh Liu Ying (first round)
5. (China) Lu Kai / Huang Yaqiong (second round)
6. (England) Chris Adcock / Gabrielle Adcock (quarterfinals)
7. (Indonesia) Tontowi Ahmad / Liliyana Natsir (champion)
8. (China) Zheng Siwei / Chen Qingchen (second round)

=== Top half ===
First Round
1	(South Korea) Ko S-h (South Korea) Kim H-n	15	14
(Hong Kong) Tang C M (Hong Kong) Tse Y S	21	21
(Indonesia) I Fadhilah (Indonesia) W Anggraini	11	16
Q3	(Chinese Taipei) Wang C-l (Chinese Taipei) Lee C-h	21	21
6	(England) C Adcock (England) G Adcock	21	21
(Egypt) A Kashkal (Egypt) H Hosny	5	8
(Indonesia) R Alexander (Indonesia) M D Oktavianti	15	18
(Thailand) B Isara (Thailand) S Amitrapai	21	21
PFQ	(Chinese Taipei) Lee Y (Chinese Taipei) Kuo Y-w	13	15
Q2	(Chinese Taipei) Lu C-y (Chinese Taipei) Chiang K-h	21	21
(Thailand) N Puangpuapech (Thailand) J Kititharakul	19	11
(China) Liu C (China) Li YH	21	21
7	(Indonesia) T Ahmad (Indonesia) L Natsir	21	21
(Chinese Taipei) Lin C-y (Chinese Taipei) Wu T-j	16	11
(Japan) Y Watanabe (Japan) A Higashino	23	21
PFQ	(Hong Kong) Tam C H (Hong Kong) Ng T Y	21	19

Second Round
(Hong Kong) Tang C M (Hong Kong) Tse Y S	15	22	21
Q3	(Chinese Taipei) Wang C-l (Chinese Taipei) Lee C-h	21	20	12
6	(England) C Adcock (England) G Adcock	w	/	o
(Thailand) B Isara (Thailand) S Amitrapai
Q2	(Chinese Taipei) Lu C-y (Chinese Taipei) Chiang K-h	13	16
(China) Liu C (China) Li YH	21	21
7	(Indonesia) T Ahmad (Indonesia) L Natsir	15	21	21
(Japan) Y Watanabe (Japan) A Higashino	21	17	17

Quarterfinals
(Hong Kong) Tang C M (Hong Kong) Tse Y S	21	22
6	(England) C Adcock (England) G Adcock	19	20
(China) Liu C (China) Li YH	13	14
7	(Indonesia) T Ahmad (Indonesia) L Natsir	21	21

Semifinals
(Hong Kong) Tang C M (Hong Kong) Tse Y S	21	14
7	(Indonesia) T Ahmad (Indonesia) L Natsir	23	21

=== Bottom half ===
First Round
Q4	(South Korea) Choi S-g (South Korea) Chae Y-j	21	19	21
(Indonesia) A E Prasetya (Indonesia) A Saufika	12	21	17
Q1	(Hong Kong) Mak H C (Hong Kong) Yeung N T	13	21	16
5	(China) Lu K (China) Huang YQ	21	18	21
(Thailand) D Puavaranukroh (Thailand) S Taerattanachai	11	14
(China) Zhang N (China) Huang DP	21	21
(South Korea) Yoo Y-s (South Korea) Chang Y-n	21	21
4	(Malaysia) Chan P S (Malaysia) Goh L Y	12	11
(Hong Kong) Lee C H (Hong Kong) Chau H W	21	21
(Japan) K Kazuno (Japan) A Kurihara	11	15
(Indonesia) H Faisal (Indonesia) S D Aulia	17	13
8	(China) Zhen SW (China) Chen QC	21	21
(Malaysia) Tan K M (Malaysia) Lai P J	16	18
(Japan) Y Kobayashi (Japan) M Matsutomo	21	21
(South Korea) Kim J-h (South Korea) Lee S-h	15	12
2	(Indonesia) P Jordan (Indonesia) D Susanto	21	21

Second Round
Q4	(South Korea) Choi S-g (South Korea) Chae Y-j	22	5	21
5	(China) Lu K (China) Huang YQ	20	21	19
(China) Zhang N (China) Huang DP	21	21
(South Korea) Yoo Y-s (South Korea) Chang Y-n	16	14
(Hong Kong) Lee C H (Hong Kong) Chau H W	21	21
8	(China) Zhen SW (China) Chen QC	17	14
(Japan) Y Kobayashi (Japan) M Matsutomo	15	14
2	(Indonesia) P Jordan (Indonesia) D Susanto	21	21

Quarterfinals
Q4	(South Korea) Choi S-g (South Korea) Chae Y-j	21	14	21
(China) Zhang N (China) Huang DP	19	21	19
(Hong Kong) Lee C H (Hong Kong) Chau H W	21	20	14
2	(Indonesia) P Jordan (Indonesia) D Susanto	17	22	21

Semifinals
Q4	(South Korea) Choi S-g (South Korea) Chae Y-j	21	18	18
2	(Indonesia) P Jordan (Indonesia) D Susanto	19	21	21

=== Finals ===
Semifinals
(Hong Kong) Tang Chun Man (Hong Kong) Tse Ying Suet	21	14
7	(Indonesia) Tontowi Ahmad (Indonesia) Liliyana Natsir	23	21
Q4	(South Korea) Choi Sol-gyu (South Korea) Chae Yoo-jung	21	18	18
2	(Indonesia) Praveen Jordan (Indonesia) Debby Susanto	19	21	21

Final
7	(Indonesia) Tontowi Ahmad (Indonesia) Liliyana Natsir	21	21
2	(Indonesia) Praveen Jordan (Indonesia) Debby Susanto	19	17

Preceded by 2015 Hong Kong Super Series	Hong Kong Open	Succeeded by 2017 Hong Kong Super Series
Preceded by 2016 China Open Super Series Premier	BWF Super Series; 2016 BWF Season	Succeeded by 2016 BWF Super Series Masters Finals
