= 2016 China Open Super Series Premier =

Tournament details
- Dates: 15 – 20 November 2016
- Level: Super Series Premier
- Total prize money: US$700,000
- Venue: Haixia Olympic Sports Center
- Location: Fuzhou, China

Champions
- Men's singles: (Denmark) Jan Ø. Jørgensen
- Women's singles: (India) P. V. Sindhu
- Men's doubles: (Indonesia) Marcus Fernaldi Gideon (Indonesia) Kevin Sanjaya Sukamuljo
- Women's doubles: (South Korea) Chang Ye-na (South Korea) Lee So-hee
- Mixed doubles: (Indonesia) Tontowi Ahmad (Indonesia) Liliyana Natsir

The 2016 China Open Super Series Premier was the eleventh Superseries tournament of the 2016 BWF Super Series. The tournament will take place in Fuzhou, China from November 15–20, 2016 with a total prize money of $700,000. For the first time in the history of this super series tournament, none of the Chinese players won any title.

== Controversies ==
The second-round women's doubles match between top seeds and reigning Olympic champions Misaki Matsutomo and Ayaka Takahashi of Japan and China's Huang Dongping and Li Yinhui featured a disputed officiating decision. The Japanese pair lost 21–14, 20–22, 20–22.

Near the end of the second game, Matsutomo and Takahashi immediately requested an instant review after a line call went against them, but Chinese umpire Cai Fengjie refused the request. The Japanese pair briefly refused to resume play, prompting the referee to come onto the court, but the original call remained in place. BWF's match report later described the incident as a "contentious line call".

During BWF's official broadcast, commentators Gillian Clark and Steen Pedersen criticised the umpire's refusal of the challenge. Danish commentator and former international player Jim Laugesen described the refusal as a rules error, saying that the umpire appeared to have applied the former limit of two challenges per match rather than the two-per-game rule in effect in 2016.

== Players by nation ==
Nation	First round	Second round	Quarterfinals	Semifinals	Final
(China)	17	10	4	3	4
(Chinese Taipei)	16	3		1	
(Japan)	5	5	7		
(Indonesia)	5	4	4		4
(Thailand)	5	3			
(Malaysia)	3	2		1	
(South Korea)	3	1	2	3	2
(Hong Kong)	2	6			
(India)	2	1	1		1
(Denmark)	2		3	2	1
(United States)	1	1			
(Bulgaria)	1		1		
(Singapore)	1				
(Russia)	1				
(England)		3			
(Germany)		1			
(Spain)			1		

== Men's singles ==
=== Seeds ===
1. (Malaysia) Lee Chong Wei (withdrew)
2. (China) Chen Long (final)
3. (Denmark) Viktor Axelsen (semifinals)
4. (Denmark) Jan Ø. Jørgensen (champion)
5. (China) Tian Houwei (quarterfinals)
6. (South Korea) Son Wan-ho (first round)
7. (Chinese Taipei) Chou Tien-chen (first round)
8. (Denmark) Hans-Kristian Vittinghus (withdrew)

=== Top half ===
First Round
PFQ	(Japan) K Sakai	14	21	5
Q1	(China) Guo K	21	11	21
Q4	(Chinese Taipei) Lin Y-h	21	15	11
(Malaysia) I Z Zainuddin	19	21	21
7	(Chinese Taipei) Chou T-c	11	13
(China) Qiao B	21	21
(India) H. S. Prannoy	21	21
(Hong Kong) Ng K L	13	13
4	(Denmark) J Ø Jørgensen	21	21
(Chinese Taipei) Wang T-w	18	14
(China) Huang YX	22	18
(England) R Ouseph	24	21
5	(China) Tian HW	21	21
(Chinese Taipei) Hsu J-h	18	19
(Hong Kong) Wong W K	21	21
(Indonesia) S D Kuncoro	15	8

Second Round
Q1	(China) Guo K	21	6	21
(Malaysia) I Z Zainuddin	7	21	23
(China) Qiao B	21	21
(India) H. S. Prannoy	17	19
4	(Denmark) J Ø Jørgensen	21	21
(England) R Ouseph	17	13
5	(China) Tian HW	21	21
(Hong Kong) Wong W K	15	13

Quarterfinals
(Malaysia) I Z Zainuddin	21	21
(China) Qiao B	19	7
4	(Denmark) J Ø Jørgensen	14	21	21
5	(China) Tian HW	21	16	14

Semifinals
(Malaysia) I Z Zainuddin	20	22	7
4	(Denmark) J Ø Jørgensen	22	20	21

=== Bottom half ===
First Round
(India) B. S Praneeth	16	9
(Germany) M Zwiebler	21	21
(Thailand) T Saensomboonsuk	14	13
PFQ	(Japan) T Ueda	21	21
PFQ	(Malaysia) Z Zulkiffli	18	19
(Hong Kong) Hu Y	21	21
PFQ	(China) Xue S	17	21	13
3	(Denmark) V Axelsen	21	14	21
Q2	(China) Zhu SY	19	22	17
(India) A Jayaram	21	20	21
(Hong Kong) Wei N	21	21	21
6	(South Korea) Son W-h	16	23	15
(China) Shi YQ	21	21
Q3	(China) Zhao JP	14	19
(Indonesia) T Sugiarto	5^{r}
2	(China) Chen L	17

Second Round
(Germany) M Zwiebler	17	18
PFQ	(Japan) T Ueda	21	21
(Hong Kong) Hu Y	15	18
3	(Denmark) V Axelsen	21	21
(India) A Jayaram	20	21	21
(Hong Kong) Wei N	22	19	12
(China) Shi YQ	16	13
2	(China) Chen L	21	21

Quarterfinals
PFQ	(Japan) T Ueda	11	6
3	(Denmark) V Axelsen	21	21
(India) A Jayaram	15	14
2	(China) Chen L	21	21

Semifinals
3	(Denmark) V Axelsen	18	21	14
2	(China) Chen L	21	9	21

=== Finals ===
Semifinals
(Malaysia) Iskandar Zulkarnain Zainuddin	20	22	7
4	(Denmark) Jan Ø. Jørgensen	22	20	21
3	(Denmark) Viktor Axelsen	18	21	14
2	(China) Chen Long	21	9	21

Final
4	(Denmark) Jan Ø. Jørgensen	22	21
2	(China) Chen Long	20	13

== Women's singles ==
=== Seeds ===
1. (Spain) Carolina Marín (quarterfinals)
2. (Thailand) Ratchanok Intanon (first round)
3. (Japan) Nozomi Okuhara (first round)
4. (India) Saina Nehwal (first round)
5. (Chinese Taipei) Tai Tzu-ying (semifinals)
6. (South Korea) Sung Ji-hyun (semifinals)
7. (India) P. V. Sindhu (champion)
8. (China) Sun Yu (final)

=== Top half ===
First Round
1	(Spain) C Marín	21	21
Q4	(China) Ji ST	18	15
(Bulgaria) L Zetchiri	14	13
(Japan) S Sato	21	21
5	(Chinese Taipei) Tai T-y	21	24	21
(Japan) A Ohori	17	26	10
(China) Gao FJ	17	11
(Japan) M Mitani	21	21
3	(Japan) N Okuhara	6^{r}
(Hong Kong) Yip P Y	11
(Denmark) L Kjaersfeldt	22	9	22
(China) Chen XX	20	21	20
8	(China) Sun Y	21	21
(Thailand) B Ongbamrungphan	10	18
Q1	(China) Peng Q	16	12
(China) Chen YF	21	21

Second Round
1	(Spain) C Marín	21	21
(Japan) S Sato	13	12
5	(Chinese Taipei) Tai T-y	21	21
(Japan) M Mitani	15	19
(Hong Kong) Yip P Y	13	15
(Denmark) L Kjaersfeldt	21	21
8	(China) Sun Y	21	21
(China) Chen YF	12	18

Quarterfinals
1	(Spain) C Marín	10	20
5	(Chinese Taipei) Tai T-y	21	22
(Denmark) L Kjaersfeldt	19	3
8	(China) Sun Y	21	21

Semifinals
5	(Chinese Taipei) Tai T-y	8	21
8	(China) Sun Y	21	23

=== Bottom half ===
First Round
(Chinese Taipei) Hsu Y-c	16	18
(United States) Zhang BW	21	21
(Chinese Taipei) Lee C-h	12	16
7	(India) P. V. Sindhu	21	21
Q3	(China) Zhang YM	22	17	19
(China) He BJ	20	21	21
(Thailand) P Buranaprasertsuk	21	19	21
4	(India) S Nehwal	16	21	14
(Singapore) Liang XY	16	13
(Chinese Taipei) Chiang M-h	21	21
(Thailand) N Jindapol	14	14
6	(South Korea) Sung J-h	21	21
(China) Shen YY	21	14	21
Q2	(China) Hui XR	19	21	16
(Japan) A Yamaguchi	4
2	(Thailand) R Intanon	0^{r}

Second Round
(United States) Zhang BW	21	20	17
7	(India) P. V. Sindhu	18	22	21
(China) He BJ	22	21
(Thailand) P Buranaprasertsuk	20	15
(Chinese Taipei) Chiang M-h	9	17
6	(South Korea) Sung J-h	21	21
(China) Shen YY	21	10	16
(Japan) A Yamaguchi	10	21	21

Quarterfinals
7	(India) P. V. Sindhu	22	21
(China) He BJ	20	10
6	(South Korea) Sung J-h	22	10	21
(Japan) A Yamaguchi	20	21	18

Semifinals
7	(India) P. V. Sindhu	11	23	21
6	(South Korea) Sung J-h	21	21	19

=== Finals ===
Semifinals
5	(Chinese Taipei) Tai Tzu-ying	8	21
8	(China) Sun Yu	21	23
7	(India) P. V. Sindhu	11	23	21
6	(South Korea) Sung Ji-hyun	21	21	19

Final
8	(China) Sun Yu	11	21	11
7	(India) P. V. Sindhu	21	17	21

== Men's doubles ==
=== Seeds ===
1. (China) Chai Biao / Hong Wei (semifinals)
2. (Malaysia) Goh V Shem / Tan Wee Kiong (first round)
3. (China) Li Junhui / Liu Yuchen (first round)
4. (Denmark) Mathias Boe / Carsten Mogensen (final)
5. (Denmark) Mads Conrad-Petersen / Mads Pieler Kolding (quarterfinals)
6. (Russia) Vladimir Ivanov / Ivan Sozonov (first round)
7. (Indonesia) Markus Fernaldi Gideon / Kevin Sanjaya Sukamuljo (champion)
8. (Japan) Takeshi Kamura / Keigo Sonoda (quarterfinals)

=== Top half ===
First Round
1	(China) Chai B (China) Hong W	24	19	21
(Japan) H Endo (Japan) Y Watanabe	22	21	13
(Indonesia) A Pratama (Indonesia) R K Suwardi	19	14
Q3	(China) Lu K (China) Zheng SW	21	21
5	(Denmark) M Conrad-Petersen (Denmark) M P Kolding	19	21	21
(Malaysia) Koo K K (Malaysia) Tan B H	21	17	13
(South Korea) Choi S-g (South Korea) Ko S-h
Q4	Bye
3	(China) Li JH (China) Liu YC	17	15
(Japan) T Hoki (Japan) Y Kobayashi	21	21
PFQ	(China) Yu XY (China) Zhang W	21	16	21
(Chinese Taipei) Lee S-m (Chinese Taipei) Lin C-y	15	21	16
7	(Indonesia) M F Gideon (Indonesia) K S Sukamuljo	21	23
(South Korea) Kim J-h (South Korea) Yoo Y-s	18	21
(England) M Ellis (England) C Langridge
Q1	Bye

Second Round
1	(China) Chai B (China) Hong W	21	21
Q3	(China) Lu K (China) Zheng SW	14	17
5	(Denmark) M Conrad-Petersen (Denmark) M P Kolding	21	21
(South Korea) Choi S-g (South Korea) Ko S-h	13	14
(Japan) T Hoki (Japan) Y Kobayashi	18	21	21
PFQ	(China) Yu XY (China) Zhang W	21	16	17
7	(Indonesia) M F Gideon (Indonesia) K S Sukamuljo	21	21
(England) M Ellis (England) C Langridge	16	13

Quarterfinals
1	(China) Chai B (China) Hong W	20	21	21
5	(Denmark) M Conrad-Petersen (Denmark) M P Kolding	22	19	18
(Japan) T Hoki (Japan) Y Kobayashi	13	17
7	(Indonesia) M F Gideon (Indonesia) K S Sukamuljo	21	21

Semifinals
1	(China) Chai B (China) Hong W	21	24	19
7	(Indonesia) M F Gideon (Indonesia) K S Sukamuljo	16	26	21

=== Bottom half ===
First Round
Q2	Bye
(China) Huang KX (China) Wang YL
(Indonesia) M Ahsan (Indonesia) R A Saputro	18	12
8	(Japan) T Kamura (Japan) K Sonoda	21	21
(Indonesia) B Angriawan (Indonesia) H Setiawan	19	14
(Chinese Taipei) Lee J-h (Chinese Taipei) Lee Y	21	21
PFQ	(Chinese Taipei) Liao K-h (Chinese Taipei) Lu C-p	10	22	10
4	(Denmark) M Boe (Denmark) C Mogensen	21	20	21
(Chinese Taipei) Chen H-l (Chinese Taipei) Wang C-l	17	19
PFQ	(Hong Kong) Law C H (Hong Kong) Lee C H	21	21
(Denmark) K Astrup (Denmark) A S Rasmussen	9	23	24
6	(Russia) V Ivanov (Russia) I Sozonov	21	21	22
(Hong Kong) Or C C (Hong Kong) Tang C M	21	13	21
(Japan) T Inoue (Japan) Y Kaneko	18	21	12
(China) Liu C (China) Zhan N	19	21	24
2	(Malaysia) Goh V S (Malaysia) Tan W K	21	16	22

Second Round
(China) Huang KX (China) Wang YL	16	22	25
8	(Japan) T Kamura (Japan) K Sonoda	21	20	27
(Chinese Taipei) Lee J-h (Chinese Taipei) Lee Y	16	7
4	(Denmark) M Boe (Denmark) C Mogensen	21	21
PFQ	(Hong Kong) Law C H (Hong Kong) Lee C H	16	21	18
(Denmark) K Astrup (Denmark) A S Rasmussen	21	10	21
(Hong Kong) Or C C (Hong Kong) Tang C M	14	22
(China) Liu C (China) Zhan N	21	24

Quarterfinals
8	(Japan) T Kamura (Japan) K Sonoda	14	16
4	(Denmark) M Boe (Denmark) C Mogensen	21	21
(Denmark) K Astrup (Denmark) A S Rasmussen	21	21	19
(China) Liu C (China) Zhan N	23	11	21

Semifinals
4	(Denmark) M Boe (Denmark) C Mogensen	23	21
(China) Liu C (China) Zhan N	21	17

=== Finals ===
Semifinals
1	(China) Chai Biao (China) Hong Wei	21	24	19
7	(Indonesia) Marcus Fernaldi Gideon (Indonesia) Kevin Sanjaya Sukamuljo	16	26	21
4	(Denmark) Mathias Boe (Denmark) Carsten Mogensen	23	21
(China) Liu Cheng (China) Zhan Nan	21	17

Final
7	(Indonesia) Marcus Fernaldi Gideon (Indonesia) Kevin Sanjaya Sukamuljo	21	22
4	(Denmark) Mathias Boe (Denmark) Carsten Mogensen	18	20

== Women's doubles ==
=== Seeds ===
1. (Japan) Misaki Matsutomo / Ayaka Takahashi (second round)
2. (South Korea) Jung Kyung-eun / Shin Seung-chan (quarterfinals)
3. (Denmark) Christinna Pedersen / Kamilla Rytter Juhl (semifinals)
4. (China) Luo Ying / Luo Yu (semifinals)
5. (Indonesia) Nitya Krishinda Maheswari / Greysia Polii (second round)
6. (South Korea) Chang Ye-na / Lee So-hee (champion)
7. (Japan) Naoko Fukuman / Kurumi Yonao (second round)
8. (Japan) Shizuka Matsuo / Mami Naito (quarterfinals)

=== Top half ===
First Round
(China) Huang DP (China) Li YH	21	21
(Chinese Taipei) Chiang K-h (Chinese Taipei) Hung S-h	16	17
(China) Bao YX (China) Yu XH
(Bulgaria) G Stoeva (Bulgaria) S Stoeva	w	/	o
(Indonesia) A S Awanda (Indonesia) N K Mahadewi Istirani	21	21
(Chinese Taipei) Chen S-y (Chinese Taipei) Tang W-y	12	12
(Japan) S Tanaka (Japan) K Yonemoto	21	9	21
(China) Chen QC (China) Jia YF	19	21	17

Second Round
1	(Japan) M Matsutomo (Japan) A Takahashi	21	20	20
(China) Huang DP (China) Li YH	14	22	22
5	(Indonesia) N K Maheswari (Indonesia) G Polii
(Bulgaria) G Stoeva (Bulgaria) S Stoeva	w	/	o
3	(Denmark) C Pedersen (Denmark) K Rytter Juhl	21	17	21
(Indonesia) A S Awanda (Indonesia) N K Mahadewi Istirani	17	21	15
7	(Japan) N Fukuman (Japan) K Yonao	9	21	14
(Japan) S Tanaka (Japan) K Yonemoto	21	17	21

Quarterfinals
(China) Huang DP (China) Li YH	21	21
(Bulgaria) G Stoeva (Bulgaria) S Stoeva	16	10
3	(Denmark) C Pedersen (Denmark) K Rytter Juhl	21	21
(Japan) S Tanaka (Japan) K Yonemoto	17	18

Semifinals
(China) Huang DP (China) Li YH	21	21
3	(Denmark) C Pedersen (Denmark) K Rytter Juhl	16	18

=== Bottom half ===
First Round
(China) Ma J (China) Zhong QX
(Thailand) J Kititharakul (Thailand) R Prajongjai	w	/	o
(China) Huang YQ (China) Tang JH
(Indonesia) D D Haris (Indonesia) R E Putri Sari	w	/	o
(Chinese Taipei) Hsu Y-c (Chinese Taipei) Wu T-j	18	21	21
(China) Chen Lu (China) Ou DN	21	11	16
(Chinese Taipei) Lin X-m (Chinese Taipei) Wu F-c	8	10
(Malaysia) Vivian Hoo K M (Malaysia) Woon K W	21	21

Second Round
(Thailand) J Kititharakul (Thailand) R Prajongjai	13	13
8	(Japan) S Matsuo (Japan) M Naito	21	21
(Indonesia) D D Haris (Indonesia) R E Putri Sari	18	13
4	(China) Luo Y (China) Luo Y	21	21
(Chinese Taipei) Hsu Y-c (Chinese Taipei) Wu T-j	15	12
6	(South Korea) Chang Y-n (South Korea) Lee S-h	21	21
(Malaysia) Vivian Hoo K M (Malaysia) Woon K W	23	14	13
2	(South Korea) Jung K-e (South Korea) Shin S-c	21	21	21

Quarterfinals
8	(Japan) S Matsuo (Japan) M Naito	21	12	16
4	(China) Luo Y (China) Luo Y	13	21	21
6	(South Korea) Chang Y-n (South Korea) Lee S-h	21	21
2	(South Korea) Jung K-e (South Korea) Shin S-c	16	14

Semifinals
4	(China) Luo Y (China) Luo Y	14	22
6	(South Korea) Chang Y-n (South Korea) Lee S-h	21	24

=== Finals ===
Semifinals
(China) Huang Dongping (China) Li Yinhui	21	21
3	(Denmark) Christinna Pedersen (Denmark) Kamilla Rytter Juhl	16	18
4	(China) Luo Ying (China) Luo Yu	14	22
6	(South Korea) Chang Ye-na (South Korea) Lee So-hee	21	24

Final
(China) Huang Dongping (China) Li Yinhui	21	14	17
6	(South Korea) Chang Ye-na (South Korea) Lee So-hee	13	21	21

== Mixed doubles ==
=== Seeds ===
1. (South Korea) Ko Sung-hyun / Kim Ha-na (semifinals)
2. (Indonesia) Tontowi Ahmad / Liliyana Natsir (champion)
3. (Malaysia) Chan Peng Soon / Goh Liu Ying (second round)
4. (Indonesia) Praveen Jordan / Debby Susanto (quarterfinals)
5. (China) Zheng Siwei / Chen Qingchen (quarterfinals)
6. (Denmark) Joachim Fischer Nielsen / Christinna Pedersen (first round)
7. (China) Lu Kai / Huang Yaqiong (second round)
8. (England) Chris Adcock / Gabrielle Adcock (second round)

=== Top half ===
First Round
(Thailand) N Puangpuapech (Thailand) J Kititharakul	w	/	o
(China) Xu C (China) Tang JH
(Japan) Y Watanabe (Japan) A Higashino	21	21
(Hong Kong) Lee C H (Hong Kong) Chau H W	12	15
(Chinese Taipei) Wang C-l (Chinese Taipei) Lee C-h	17	24
(China) Zhang N (China) Li YH	21	26
5	(China) Zheng SW (China) Chen QC	21	21
(Chinese Taipei) Lu C-y (Chinese Taipei) Chiang K-h	9	17
(Chinese Taipei) Lee Y (Chinese Taipei) Hsu Y-c	17	21	15
(Indonesia) R Alexander (Indonesia) M D Oktavianti	21	18	21

Second Round
1	(South Korea) Ko S-h (South Korea) Kim H-n	18	21	21
(Thailand) N Puangpuapech (Thailand) J Kititharakul	21	15	19
8	(England) C Adcock (England) G Adcock	15	12
(Japan) Y Watanabe (Japan) A Higashino	21	21
3	(Malaysia) Chan P S (Malaysia) Goh L Y	17	19
(China) Zhang N (China) Li YH	21	21
5	(China) Zheng SW (China) Chen QC	21	21
(Indonesia) R Alexander (Indonesia) M D Oktavianti	12	19

Quarterfinals
1	(South Korea) Ko S-h (South Korea) Kim H-n	21	21
(Japan) Y Watanabe (Japan) A Higashino	17	10
(China) Zhang N (China) Li YH	18	22	21
5	(China) Zheng SW (China) Chen QC	21	20	17

Semifinals
1	(South Korea) Ko S-h (South Korea) Kim H-n	19	21	15
(China) Zhang N (China) Li YH	21	10	21

=== Bottom half ===
First Round
(Thailand) B Issara (Thailand) S Amitrapai
(South Korea) Choi S-g (South Korea) Chae Y-j	w	/	o
(South Korea) Kim J-h (South Korea) Lee S-h	18	12
7	(China) Lu K (China) Huang YQ	21	21
(Denmark) K Astrup (Denmark) L Kjærsfeldt	11	21	12
(China) Liu YC (China) Chen Lu	21	6	21
(South Korea) Yoo Y-s (South Korea) Chang Y-n	21	21
(United States) Y T Chan (United States) Y Kawasaki	11	9
(China) Liu C (China) Huang DP	21	21
6	(Denmark) J Fischer Nielsen (Denmark) C Pedersen	19	19
(Japan) K Kazuno (Japan) A Kurihara	21	21
(Chinese Taipei) Lin C-y (Chinese Taipei) Wu T-j	15	15

Second Round
(South Korea) Choi S-g (South Korea) Chae Y-j	21	15	24
7	(China) Lu K (China) Huang YQ	19	21	22
(China) Liu YC (China) Chen Lu	21	7	17
4	(Indonesia) P Jordan (Indonesia) D Susanto	17	21	21
(South Korea) Yoo Y-s (South Korea) Chang Y-n	21	18	21
(China) Liu C (China) Huang DP	17	21	15
(Japan) K Kazuno (Japan) A Kurihara	15	11
2	(Indonesia) T Ahmad (Indonesia) L Natsir	21	21

Quarterfinals
(South Korea) Choi S-g (South Korea) Chae Y-j	21	21
4	(Indonesia) P Jordan (Indonesia) D Susanto	15	13
(South Korea) Yoo Y-s (South Korea) Chang Y-n	21	14	18
2	(Indonesia) T Ahmad (Indonesia) L Natsir	19	21	21

Semifinals
(South Korea) Choi S-g (South Korea) Chae Y-j	17	23
2	(Indonesia) T Ahmad (Indonesia) L Natsir	21	25

=== Finals ===
Semifinals
1	(South Korea) Ko Sung-hyun (South Korea) Kim Ha-na	19	21	15
(China) Zhang Nan (China) Li Yinhui	21	10	21
(South Korea) Choi Sol-gyu (South Korea) Chae Yoo-jung	17	23
2	(Indonesia) Tontowi Ahmad (Indonesia) Liliyana Natsir	21	25

Final
(China) Zhang Nan (China) Li Yinhui	13	24	16
2	(Indonesia) Tontowi Ahmad (Indonesia) Liliyana Natsir	21	22	21

Preceded by 2015 China Open Super Series Premier	China Open	Succeeded by 2017 China Open Super Series Premier
Preceded by 2016 French Super Series	BWF Super Series; 2016 BWF Season	Succeeded by 2016 Hong Kong Super Series
