= 2016 Korea Open Super Series =

Tournament details
- Dates: 27 September – 2 October 2016
- Level: Super Series
- Total prize money: US$600,000
- Venue: Seong-nam Indoor Stadium
- Location: Seongnam, South Korea

Champions
- Men's singles: (China) Qiao Bin
- Women's singles: (Japan) Akane Yamaguchi
- Men's doubles: (South Korea) Lee Yong-dae (South Korea) Yoo Yeon-seong
- Women's doubles: (South Korea) Jung Kyung-eun (South Korea) Shin Seung-chan
- Mixed doubles: (South Korea) Ko Sung-hyun (South Korea) Kim Ha-na

The 2016 Korea Open Super Series was the eighth Super Series tournament of the 2016 BWF Super Series. The tournament took place at Seong-nam Indoor Stadium in Seongnam, South Korea from September 27 – October 2, 2016, and had a total prize of $600,000.

== Men's singles ==
=== Seeds ===
1. (Malaysia) Lee Chong Wei (withdrew)
2. (Denmark) Viktor Axelsen (withdrew)
3. (Denmark) Jan Ø. Jørgensen (second round)
4. (China) Tian Houwei (quarterfinal)
5. (Chinese Taipei) Chou Tien-chen (first round)
6. (South Korea) Son Wan-ho (final)
7. (Indonesia) Tommy Sugiarto (withdrew)
8. (India) Srikanth Kidambi (first round)

=== Top half ===
First Round
PFQ	(Malaysia) Goh S H	15	12
(Denmark) H-K Vittinghus	21	21
(India) H. S. Prannoy	23	17	15
(Chinese Taipei) Wang T-w	21	21	21
6	(South Korea) Son W-h	21	21
(China) Shi YQ	18	10
(Chinese Taipei) Hsu J-h	13	21	15
(India) B. S Praneeth	21	12	21
3	(Denmark) J Ø. Jørgensen	23	21
(Indonesia) S D Kuncoro	21	13
Q4	(Japan) K Sakai	11	12
(South Korea) Lee H-i	21	21
PFQ	(China) Huang YX	21	21
(South Korea) Lee D-k	11	10
(South Korea) Jeon H-j	21	18
(India) A Jayaram	23	21

Second Round
(Denmark) H-K Vittinghus	21	21
(Chinese Taipei) Wang T-w	13	11
6	(South Korea) Son W-h	21	21
(India) B. S Praneeth	9	15
3	(Denmark) J Ø. Jørgensen	21	18	13
(South Korea) Lee H-i	18	21	21
(China) Huang YX	15	18
(India) A Jayaram	21	21

Quarterfinals
(Denmark) H-K Vittinghus	18	13
6	(South Korea) Son W-h	21	21
(South Korea) Lee H-i	25	21
(India) A Jayaram	23	13

Semifinals
6	(South Korea) Son W-h	21	14	21
(South Korea) Lee H-i	13	21	10

=== Bottom half ===
First Round
(Hong Kong) Hu Y	7	13
(Denmark) E Holst	21	21
(Hong Kong) Wong W K	21	22	21
8	(India) S Kidambi	10	24	17
(France) B Leverdez	21	10	12
Q2	(South Korea) Seo S-j	15	21	21
Q3	(India) K Parupalli	22	10	13
4	(China) Tian HW	20	21	21
(Malaysia) I Z Zainuddin	13	21	21
(Hong Kong) Ng K L	21	14	17
(China) Qiao B	21	21
5	(Chinese Taipei) Chou T-c	14	18
(Germany) M Zwiebler	21	21
(Hong Kong) Wei N	10	16
Q1	(South Korea) Heo K-h	22	21
PFQ	(Denmark) A Antonsen	20	18

Second Round
(Denmark) E Holst	11	11
(Hong Kong) Wong W K	21	21
Q2	(South Korea) Seo S-j	21	5	16
4	(China) Tian HW	14	21	21
(Malaysia) I Z Zainuddin	13	19
(China) Qiao B	21	21
(Germany) M Zwiebler	21	13	13
Q1	(South Korea) Heo K-h	17	21	21

Quarterfinals
(Hong Kong) Wong W K	21	21
4	(China) Tian HW	18	17
(China) Qiao B	21	21
Q1	(South Korea) Heo K-h	7	14

Semifinals
(Hong Kong) Wong W K	18	16
(China) Qiao B	21	21

=== Finals ===
Semifinals
6	(South Korea) Son W-h	21	14	21
(South Korea) Lee H-i	13	21	10
(Hong Kong) Wong W K	18	16
(China) Qiao B	21	21

Final
6	(South Korea) Son W-h	11	23	7
(China) Qiao B	21	21	21

== Women's singles ==
=== Seeds ===
1. (Spain) Carolina Marín (withdrew)
2. (Japan) Nozomi Okuhara (withdrew)
3. (Thailand) Ratchanok Intanon (second round)
4. (Chinese Taipei) Tai Tzu-ying (quarterfinal)
5. (South Korea) Sung Ji-hyun (final)
6. (India) P.V. Sindhu (withdrew)
7. (Japan) Akane Yamaguchi (champion)
8. (China) Sun Yu (first round)

=== Top half ===
First Round
(South Korea) Kim H-m	16	21	21
(Denmark) L Kjærsfeldt	21	15	19
8	(China) Sun Y	18	14
(South Korea) Lee J-m	21	21
(Hong Kong) Yip P Y	19	15
(South Korea) Kim G-e	21	21
4	(Chinese Taipei) Tai T-y	21	21
(Japan) A Ohori	16	15
(South Korea) Kim N-y	21	21
(United States) M Chen	8	10
5	(South Korea) Sung J-h	21	21
(Hong Kong) Cheung N Y	14	14
(Denmark) A T Madsen	21	13	21
(India) T Lad	18	21	18

Second Round
1	(Spain) C Marín
(South Korea) Kim H-m	w	/	o
(South Korea) Lee J-m	16	19
(South Korea) Kim G-e	21	21
4	(Chinese Taipei) Tai T-y	21	19	21
(South Korea) Kim N-y	15	21	13
5	(South Korea) Sung J-h	21	21
(Denmark) A T Madsen	15	14

Quarterfinals
(South Korea) Kim H-m	21	21
(South Korea) Kim G-e	19	8
4	(Chinese Taipei) Tai T-y	16	18
5	(South Korea) Sung J-h	21	21

Semifinals
(South Korea) Kim H-m	5	10
5	(South Korea) Sung J-h	21	21

=== Bottom half ===
First Round
(China) He BJ	21	21
(Bulgaria) L Zetchiri	12	13
(Japan) M Mitani	w	/	o
6	(India) P. V. Sindhu
(Chinese Taipei) Lee C-h	19	16
(China) Chen YF	21	21
(Chinese Taipei) Hsu Y-c	13	12
3	(Thailand) R Intanon	21	21
(Japan) S Sato	21	21
(Indonesia) L A Mainaky	12	6
(South Korea) Lee M-j	18	21	13
7	' (Japan) A Yamaguchi	21	16	21
(South Korea) Kim H-i	21	21
(Chinese Taipei) Pai Y-p	17	16
(South Korea) Bae Y-j	w	/	o
2	(Japan) N Okuhara	w	/	o

Second Round
(China) He BJ	21	19	16
(Japan) M Mitani	18	21	21
(China) Chen YF	21	21
3	(Thailand) R Intanon	17	17
(Japan) S Sato	6	17
7	(Japan) A Yamaguchi	21	21
(South Korea) Kim H-i
BYE

Quarterfinals
(Japan) M Mitani	14	21	21
(China) Chen YF	21	19	16
7	(Japan) A Yamaguchi	21	21
(South Korea) Kim H-i	13	13

Semifinals
(Japan) M Mitani	17	11
7	(Japan) A Yamaguchi	21	21

=== Finals ===
Semifinals
(South Korea) Kim H-m	5	10
5	(South Korea) Sung J-h	21	21
(Japan) M Mitani	17	11
7	(Japan) A Yamaguchi	21	21

Final
5	(South Korea) Sung J-h	22	15	18
7	(Japan) A Yamaguchi	20	21	21

== Men's doubles ==
=== Seeds ===
1. (South Korea) Lee Yong-dae / Yoo Yeon-seong (champions)
2. (China) Chai Biao / Hong Wei (quarterfinal)
3. (Indonesia) Mohammad Ahsan / Hendra Setiawan (quarterfinal)
4. (Denmark) Mathias Boe / Carsten Mogensen (withdrew)
5. (Malaysia) Goh V Shem / Tan Wee Kiong (semifinal)
6. (Denmark) Mads Conrad-Petersen / Mads Pieler Kolding (first round)
7. (China) Li Junhui / Liu Yuchen (final)
8. (Japan) Takeshi Kamura / Keigo Sonoda (quarterfinal)

=== Top half ===
First Round
(China) Liu XL (China) Lu K	15	21	21
(England) B Lane (England) S Vendy	21	10	12
8	(Japan) T Kamura (Japan) K Sonoda	29	21	21
(South Korea) Kim J-h (South Korea) Ko S-h	30	19	9
(South Korea) Park S-w (South Korea) Seo G-m	14	16
(Denmark) M Christiansen (Denmark) D Daugaard	21	21
4	(Denmark) M Boe (Denmark) C Mogersen
(Chinese Taipei) Lee S-m (Chinese Taipei) Wu H-l	w	/	o
(Japan) T Hoki (Japan) Y Kobayashi	19	21	21
(South Korea) Bae K-y (South Korea) Kim D-e	21	12	11
6	(Denmark) M Conrad-Petersen (Denmark) M P Kolding	18	11
(China) Huang KX (China) Wang YL	21	21
(Malaysia) Hoon T H (Malaysia) Teo K S	21	19	22
(South Korea) Lee S-w (South Korea) Park K-h	19	21	20

Second Round
1	(South Korea) Lee Y-d (South Korea) Yoo Y-s	21	21
(China) Liu XL (China) Lu K	19	19
8	(Japan) T Kamura (Japan) K Sonoda	21	21
(Denmark) M Christiansen (Denmark) D Daugaard	11	10
(Chinese Taipei) Lee S-m (Chinese Taipei) Wu H-l	10	22	24
(Japan) T Hoki (Japan) Y Kobayashi	21	20	26
(China) Huang KX (China) Wang YL	17	21	21
(Malaysia) Hoon T H (Malaysia) Teo K S	21	13	9

Quarterfinals
1	(South Korea) Lee Y-d (South Korea) Yoo Y-s	21	18	21
8	(Japan) T Kamura (Japan) K Sonoda	15	21	18
(Japan) T Hoki (Japan) Y Kobayashi	17	16
(China) Huang KX (China) Wang YL	21	21

Semifinals
1	(South Korea) Lee Y-d (South Korea) Yoo Y-s	21	21
(China) Huang KX (China) Wang YL	11	16

=== Bottom half ===
First Round
(Chinese Taipei) Lin C-y (Chinese Taipei) Tsai C-h	22	15
(China) Liu C (China) Zheng SW	24	21
(South Korea) Chung E-s (South Korea) Kim D-y	21	17	10
7	(China) Li JH (China) Liu YC	17	21	21
(Germany) M Lamsfuss (Germany) M E Seidel	21	14	19
(Chinese Taipei) Lee J-h (Chinese Taipei) Lee Y	19	21	21
(Scotland) A Hall (England) P Mills	16	14
3	(Indonesia) M Ahsan (Indonesia) H Setiawan	21	21
(England) P Briggs (England) T Wolfenden	w	/	o
(South Korea) Choi S-g (South Korea) Kim G-j
(Chinese Taipei) Chen H-l (Chinese Taipei) Wang C-l	20	14
5	(Malaysia) Goh V S (Malaysia) Tan W K	22	21
(Japan) T Inoue (Japan) Y Kaneko	21	21
(England) M Nottingham (England) H Towler	10	17
(Denmark) K Astrup (Denmark) A S Rasmussen	21	17	11
2	(China) Chai B (China) Hong W	15	21	21

Second Round
(China) Liu C (China) Zheng SW	20	21	22
7	(China) Li JH (China) Liu YC	22	14	24
(Chinese Taipei) Lee J-h (Chinese Taipei) Lee Y	21	14	15
3	(Indonesia) M Ahsan (Indonesia) H Setiawan	18	21	21
(England) P Briggs (England) T Wolfenden	17	16
5	(Malaysia) Goh V S (Malaysia) Tan W K	21	21
(Japan) T Inoue (Japan) Y Kaneko	21	15	10
2	(China) Chai B (China) Hong W	17	21	21

Quarterfinals
7	(China) Li JH (China) Liu YC	21	21
3	(Indonesia) M Ahsan (Indonesia) H Setiawan	11	16
5	(Malaysia) Goh V S (Malaysia) Tan W K	21	21
2	(China) Chai B (China) Hong W	18	13

Semifinals
7	(China) Li JH (China) Liu YC	18	21	21
5	(Malaysia) Goh V S (Malaysia) Tan W K	21	15	13

=== Finals ===
Semifinals
1	(South Korea) Lee Y-d (South Korea) Yoo Y-s	21	21
(China) Huang KX (China) Wang YL	11	16
7	(China) Li JH (China) Liu YC	18	21	21
5	(Malaysia) Goh V S (Malaysia) Tan W K	21	15	13

Final
1	(South Korea) Lee Y-d (South Korea) Yoo Y-s	16	22	21
7	(China) Li JH (China) Liu YC	21	20	18

== Women's doubles ==
=== Seeds ===
1. (South Korea) Jung Kyung-eun / Shin Seung-chan (champions)
2. (Denmark) Christinna Pedersen / Kamilla Rytter Juhl (semifinal)
3. (China) Luo Ying / Luo Yu (final)
4. (South Korea) Chang Ye-na / Lee So-hee (semifinal)'
5. (Japan) Naoko Fukuman / Kurumi Yonao (quarterfinal)
6. (Netherlands) Eefje Muskens / Selena Piek (second round)
7. (Japan) Shizuka Matsuo / Mami Naito (quarterfinal)
8. (China) Huang Yaqiong / Tang Jinhua (withdrew)

=== Top half ===
First Round
(China) Chen QC (China) Tang YT
(Chinese Taipei) Chiang K-h (Chinese Taipei) Hung S-h	w	/	o
(England) J Pugh (England) E Westwood	11	17
(South Korea) Kim S-y (South Korea) Kong H-y	21	21
(Malaysia) Vivian Hoo K M (Malaysia) Woon K W	9	21	18
(South Korea) Go A-r (South Korea) Kim H-i	21	13	21

Second Round
1	(South Korea) Jung K-e (South Korea) Shin S-c	21	21
(Germany) L Efler (Germany) I Herttrich	19	10
5	(Japan) N Fukuman (Japan) K Yonao	21	21	21
(Chinese Taipei) Chiang K-h (Chinese Taipei) Hung S-h	23	17	17
4	(South Korea) Chang Y-n (South Korea) Lee S-h	21	21
(South Korea) Kim S-y (South Korea) Kong H-y	12	19
7	(Japan) S Matsuo (Japan) M Naito	21	21
(South Korea) Go A-r (South Korea) Kim H-i	19	11

Quarterfinals
1	(South Korea) Jung K-e (South Korea) Shin S-c	21	21
5	(Japan) N Fukuman (Japan) K Yonao	12	13
4	(South Korea) Chang Y-n (South Korea) Lee S-h	21	25
7	(Japan) S Matsuo (Japan) M Naito	10	23

Semifinals
1	(South Korea) Jung K-e (South Korea) Shin S-c	23	21
4	(South Korea) Chang Y-n (South Korea) Lee S-h	21	15

=== Bottom half ===
First Round
(Bulgaria) G Stoeva (Bulgaria) S Stoeva	21	21
(Denmark) M Fruergaard (Denmark) S Thygesen	17	14
(Chinese Taipei) Lin X-m (Chinese Taipei) Wu F-c	14	13
(South Korea) Kim H-r (South Korea) Yoo H-w	21	21
(Germany) J Goliszewski (Germany) L Kaepplein	7	13
(China) Ou DN (China) Yu XH	21	21

Second Round
(Bulgaria) G Stoeva (Bulgaria) S Stoeva	w	/	o
8	(China) Huang YQ (China) Tang JH
(South Korea) Kim H-r (South Korea) Yoo H-w	6	17
3	(China) Luo Y (China) Luo Y	21	21
(China) Ou DN (China) Yu XH	21	21
6	(Netherlands) E Muskens (Netherlands) S Piek	15	12
(Japan) A Higashino (Japan) A kurihara	21	13	12
2	(Denmark) C Pedersen (Denmark) K Rytter Juhl	11	21	21

Quarterfinals
(Bulgaria) G Stoeva (Bulgaria) S Stoeva	21	15	18
3	(China) Luo Y (China) Luo Y	19	21	21
(China) Ou DN (China) Yu XH	18	13
2	(Denmark) C Pedersen (Denmark) K Rytter Juhl	21	21

Semifinals
3	(China) Luo Y (China) Luo Y	21	17	21
2	(Denmark) C Pedersen (Denmark) K Rytter Juhl	15	21	12

=== Finals ===
Semifinals
1	(South Korea) Jung K-e (South Korea) Shin S-c	23	21
4	(South Korea) Chang Y-n (South Korea) Lee S-h	21	15
3	(China) Luo Y (China) Luo Y	21	17	21
2	(Denmark) C Pedersen (Denmark) K Rytter Juhl	15	21	12

Final
1	(South Korea) Jung K-e (South Korea) Shin S-c	21	21
3	(China) Luo Y (China) Luo Y	13	11

== Mixed doubles ==
=== Seeds ===
1. (South Korea) Ko Sung-hyun / Kim Ha-na (champions)
2. (England) Chris Adcock / Gabrielle Adcock (second round)
3. (Malaysia) Chan Peng Soon / Goh Liu Ying (semifinal)
4. (China) Lu Kai / Huang Yaqiong (quarterfinal)
5. (China) Zheng Siwei / Chen Qingchen (final)
6. (China) Liu Yuchen / Tang Jinhua (withdrew)
7. (Japan) Kenta Kazuno / Ayane Kurihara (second round)
8. (Hong Kong) Lee Chun Hei / Chau Hoi Wah (semifinal)

=== Top half ===
First Round
(Japan) Y Watanabe (Japan) A Higashino
(South Korea) Bae K-y (South Korea) Kong H-y	w	/	o
6	(China) Liu YC (China) Tang JH
(Denmark) K Astrup (Denmark) L Kjaersfeldt	w	/	o
(South Korea) Park S-w (South Korea) Kim S-y	21	20	8
(China) Huang KX (China) Yu XH	15	22	21
(South Korea) Kim D-y (South Korea) Kim H-r	21	21
(Germany) M Lamsfuss (Germany) I Herttrich	17	16
7	(Japan) K Kazuno (Japan) A Kurihara	21	21
(England) B Lane (England) J Pugh	16	13
(Chinese Taipei) Liao M-c (Chinese Taipei) Chen H-h	13	16
(Denmark) A S Rasmussen (Denmark) S Thygesen	21	21

Second Round
1	(South Korea) Ko S-h (South Korea) Kim H-n	21	21
(South Korea) Bae K-y (South Korea) Kong H-y	13	17
(Denmark) K Astrup (Denmark) L Kjaersfeldt	21	12	21
(China) Huang KX (China) Yu XH	13	21	9
3	(Malaysia) Chan P S (Malaysia) Goh L Y	21	21
(South Korea) Kim D-y (South Korea) Kim H-r	17	16
7	(Japan) K Kazuno (Japan) A Kurihara	21	19	17
(Denmark) A S Rasmussen (Denmark) S Thygesen	17	21	21

Quarterfinals
1	(South Korea) Ko S-h (South Korea) Kim H-n	21	21
(Denmark) K Astrup (Denmark) L Kjaersfeldt	15	17
3	(Malaysia) Chan P S (Malaysia) Goh L Y	21	14	21
(Denmark) A S Rasmussen (Denmark) S Thygesen	14	21	19

Semifinals
1	(South Korea) Ko S-h (South Korea) Kim H-n	15	21	21
3	(Malaysia) Chan P S (Malaysia) Goh L Y	21	14	15

=== Bottom half ===
First Round
(Chinese Taipei) Lee Y (Chinese Taipei) Hsu Y-c	21	18	21
(Denmark) S Gravholt (Denmark) M Fruergaard	14	21	18
(South Korea) Choi S-g (South Korea) Chae Y-j	8^{r}
5	(China) Zheng SW (China) Chen QC	11
(England) M Nottingham (England) E Westwood	15	20
(Netherlands) J Arends (Netherlands) S Piek	21	22
(United States) Y T Chan (United States) Y Kawasaki	5	3^{r}
4	(China) Lu K (China) Huang YQ	21	6
(South Korea) Kim D-e (South Korea) Go A-r	21	21
(Indonesia) Y F Mainaky (Indonesia) L A Mainaky	7	9
(South Korea) Kim G-j (South Korea) Shin S-c	17	20
8	(Hong Kong) Lee C H (Hong Kong) Chau H W	21	22
(South Korea) Chung E-s (South Korea) Yoo H-w	21	21
(Germany) M E Seidel (Germany) L Efler	12	12

Second Round
(Chinese Taipei) Lee Y (Chinese Taipei) Hsu Y-c	14	10
5	(China) Zheng SW (China) Chen QC	21	21
(Netherlands) J Arends (Netherlands) S Piek	15	13
4	(China) Lu K (China) Huang YQ	21	21
(South Korea) Kim D-e (South Korea) Go A-r	18	12
8	(Hong Kong) Lee C H (Hong Kong) Chau H W	21	21
(South Korea) Chung E-s (South Korea) Yoo H-w	22	21
2	(England) C Adcock (England) G Adcock	20	7

Quarterfinals
5	(China) Zheng SW (China) Chen QC	21	21
4	(China) Lu K (China) Huang YQ	17	19
8	(Hong Kong) Lee C H (Hong Kong) Chau H W	21	13	21
(South Korea) Chung E-s (South Korea) Yoo H-w	15	21	12

Semifinals
5	(China) Zheng SW (China) Chen QC	21	21
8	(Hong Kong) Lee C H (Hong Kong) Chau H W	16	18

=== Finals ===
Semifinals
1	(South Korea) Ko S-h (South Korea) Kim H-n	15	21	21
3	(Malaysia) Chan P S (Malaysia) Goh L Y	21	14	15
5	(China) Zheng SW (China) Chen QC	21	21
8	(Hong Kong) Lee C H (Hong Kong) Chau H W	16	18

Final
1	(South Korea) Ko S-h (South Korea) Kim H-n	21	21
5	(China) Zheng SW (China) Chen QC	14	19

Preceded by 2015 Korea Open Super Series	Korea Open	Succeeded by 2017 Korea Open Super Series
Preceded by 2016 Japan Super Series	BWF Super Series; 2016 BWF Season	Succeeded by 2016 Denmark Super Series Premier
