= 2016 French Super Series =

Badminton championships

Tournament details
- Dates: 25–30 October
- Level: Super Series
- Total prize money: US$300,000
- Venue: Stade Pierre de Coubertin
- Location: Paris, France

Champions
- Men's singles: (China) Shi Yuqi
- Women's singles: (China) He Bingjiao
- Men's doubles: (Denmark) Mathias Boe (Denmark) Carsten Mogensen
- Women's doubles: (China) Chen Qingchen (China) Jia Yifan
- Mixed doubles: (China) Zheng Siwei (China) Chen Qingchen

The 2016 French Super Series was the tenth Super Series tournament of the 2016 BWF Super Series. The tournament took place in Paris, France on 25 to 30 October 2016.

== Men's singles ==
=== Seeds ===
1. (Malaysia) Lee Chong Wei (first round)
2. (Denmark) Viktor Axelsen (second round)
3. (Denmark) Jan Ø. Jørgensen (quarterfinals)
4. (China) Tian Houwei (second round)
5. (Chinese Taipei) Chou Tien-chen (quarterfinals)
6. (South Korea) Son Wan-ho (quarterfinals)
7. (India) Srikanth Kidambi (withdrew)
8. (Hong Kong) Ng Ka Long (semifinals)

=== Top half ===
First Round
1	(Malaysia) Lee C W
(Chinese Taipei) Hsu J-h	w	/	o
(Hong Kong) Wei N	13	16
(Chinese Taipei) Wang T-w	21	21
6	(South Korea) Son W-h	21	21
Q4	(Chinese Taipei) Lin Y-h	19	14
(China) Huang YX	22	21	20
PFQ	(Malaysia) Z Zulkiffli	24	12	22
4	(China) Tian HW	21	17	21
(Indonesia) I M Mustofa	13	21	17
(China) Shi YQ	21	21
(Malaysia) I Z Zainuddin	11	19
PFQ	(Spain) P Abián	21	14	10
(England) R Ouseph	17	21	21
(Indonesia) J Christie	15	21	21
Q3	(China) Xue S	21	15	13

Second Round
(Chinese Taipei) Hsu J-h	22	21
(Chinese Taipei) Wang T-w	20	12
6	(South Korea) Son W-h	21	21
PFQ	(Malaysia) Z Zulkiffli	15	14
4	(China) Tian HW	13	21	10
(China) Shi YQ	21	10	21
(England) R Ouseph	12	12
(Indonesia) J Christie	21	21

Quarterfinals
(Chinese Taipei) Hsu J-h	6	21	21
6	(South Korea) Son W-h	21	18	14
(China) Shi YQ	12	21	21
(Indonesia) J Christie	21	19	16

Semifinals
(Chinese Taipei) Hsu J-h	7	15
(China) Shi YQ	21	21

=== Bottom half ===
First Round
(Denmark) H-K Vittinghus	21	21
(Hong Kong) Hu Y	14	8
Q1	(Malaysia) Chong W F	16	4
8	(Hong Kong) Ng K L	21	21
Q2	(Indonesia) A S Ginting	20	21	21
(India) A Jayaram	22	10	18
(Germany) M Zwiebler	18	22	13
3	(Denmark) J Ø Jørgensen	21	20	21
(Thailand) B Ponsana	16	18
(India) H. S. Prannoy	21	21
(Hong Kong) Wong W K	22	11^{r}
5	(Chinese Taipei) Chou T-c	24	18
(India) B. S Praneeth	21	8	19
(South Korea) Lee H-i	15	21	21
(South Korea) Jeon H-j	10	15
2	(Denmark) V Axelsen	21	21

Second Round
(Denmark) H-K Vittinghus	21	19
8	(Hong Kong) Ng K L	23	21
Q2	(Indonesia) A S Ginting	20	15
3	(Denmark) J Ø Jørgensen	22	21
(India) H. S. Prannoy	19	16
5	(Chinese Taipei) Chou T-c	21	21
(South Korea) Lee H-i	22	21
2	(Denmark) V Axelsen	20	12

Quarterfinals
8	(Hong Kong) Ng K L	27	21
3	(Denmark) J Ø Jørgensen	25	12
5	(Chinese Taipei) Chou T-c	22	16
(South Korea) Lee H-i	24	21

Semifinals
8	(Hong Kong) Ng K L	17	15
(South Korea) Lee H-i	21	21

=== Finals ===
Semifinals
(Chinese Taipei) Hsu Jen-hao	7	15
(China) Shi Yuqi	21	21
8	(Hong Kong) Ng Ka Long	17	15
(South Korea) Lee Hyun-il	21	21

Final
(China) Shi Yuqi	21	21
(South Korea) Lee Hyun-il	16	19

== Women's singles ==
=== Seeds ===
1. (Spain) Carolina Marín (withdrew)
2. (Thailand) Ratchanok Intanon (withdrew)
3. (Japan) Nozomi Okuhara (withdrew)
4. (Chinese Taipei) Tai Tzu-ying (quarterfinals)
5. (South Korea) Sung Ji-hyun (semifinals)
6. (India) P.V. Sindhu (second round)
7. (China) Sun Yu (semifinals)
8. (Japan) Akane Yamaguchi (quarterfinals)

=== Top half ===
First Round
PFQ	(Finland) N Vainio	22	21
Q4	(France) P Le Buhanic	20	11
(Denmark) N K Rohde	17	10
(United States) Zhang BW	21	21
8	(Japan) A Yamaguchi	23	21
(Thailand) P Buranaprasertsuk	21	17
(Russia) N Perminova	6	18
(Thailand) N Jindapol	21	21
PFQ	(Chinese Taipei) Lee C-h	16	16
(Thailand) B Ongbamrungphan	21	21
(Germany) O Konon	15	21	10
(Japan) M Mitani	21	18	21
7	(China) Sun Y	21	21
(South Korea) Kim H-m	11	9
PFQ	(Switzerland) S Jaquet	16	13
(Japan) S Sato	21	21

Second Round
PFQ	(Finland) N Vainio	9	13
(United States) Zhang BW	21	21
8	(Japan) A Yamaguchi	21	21
(Thailand) N Jindapol	19	16
(Thailand) B Ongbamrungphan	13	21	21
(Japan) M Mitani	21	10	14
7	(China) Sun Y	21	17	21
(Japan) S Sato	14	21	16

Quarterfinals
(United States) Zhang BW	21	13	21
8	(Japan) A Yamaguchi	16	21	18
(Thailand) B Ongbamrungphan	15	20
7	(China) Sun Y	21	22

Semifinals
(United States) Zhang BW	21	21
7	(China) Sun Y	19	15

=== Bottom half ===
First Round
(Chinese Taipei) Hsu Y-c	21	21
Q1	(South Korea) Kim N-y	18	18
(Hong Kong) Cheung N Y	9	21	13
5	(South Korea) Sung J-h	21	19	21
Q2	(France) M Krieger	15	12
(Spain) B Corrales	21	21
PFQ	(Denmark) M Blichfeldt	13	21	12
4	(Chinese Taipei) Tai T-y	21	17	21
(China) He BJ	21	21
PFQ	(Denmark) M Poulsen	9	19
(Hong Kong) Yip P Y	9	27
6	(India) P. V. Sindhu	21	29
Q3	(Germany) F Deprez	14	16
(Ukraine) M Ulitina	21	21
(Denmark) L Kjærsfeldt	19	21	19
PFQ	(Chinese Taipei) Chiang M-h	21	12	21

Second Round
(Chinese Taipei) Hsu Y-c	11	13
5	(South Korea) Sung J-h	21	21
(Spain) B Corrales	10	21	15
4	(Chinese Taipei) Tai T-y	21	18	21
(China) He BJ	22	21
6	(India) P. V. Sindhu	20	17
(Ukraine) M Ulitina	12	9
PFQ	(Chinese Taipei) Chiang M-h	21	21

Quarterfinals
5	(South Korea) Sung J-h	21	5	21
4	(Chinese Taipei) Tai T-y	15	21	15
(China) He BJ	21	15	22
PFQ	(Chinese Taipei) Chiang M-h	18	21	20

Semifinals
5	(South Korea) Sung J-h	25	17
(China) He BJ	27	21

=== Finals ===
Semifinals
(United States) Zhang Beiwen	21	21
7	(China) Sun Yu	19	15
5	(South Korea) Sung Ji-hyun	25	17
(China) He Bingjiao	27	21

Final
(United States) Zhang Beiwen	9	9
(China) He Bingjiao	21	21

== Men's doubles ==
=== Seeds ===
1. (China) Chai Biao / Hong Wei (withdrew)
2. (Denmark) Mathias Boe / Carsten Mogensen (champion)
3. (Denmark) Mads Conrad-Petersen / Mads Pieler Kolding (second round)
4. (Malaysia) Goh V Shem / Tan Wee Kiong (first round)
5. (Indonesia) Markus Fernaldi Gideon / Kevin Sanjaya Sukamuljo (second round)
6. (China) Li Junhui / Liu Yuchen (first round)
7. (Russia) Vladimir Ivanov / Ivan Sozonov (quarterfinals)
8. (Indonesia) Angga Pratama / Ricky Karanda Suwardi (semifinals)

=== Top half ===
First Round
PFQ	(Mexico) J Castillo (Germany) J Persson	16	11
(Thailand) B Issara (Thailand) N Puangpuapech	21	21
(China) Fu HF (China) Xu C	15	21	9
PFQ	(England) M Nottingham (England) H Towler	21	19	21
7	(Russia) V Ivanov (Russia) I Sozonov	0
(Germany) R Beck (Germany) P Kaesbauer	1^{r}
(Japan) T Hoki (Japan) Y Kobayashi	21	21
PFQ	(Scotland) A Hall (England) P Mills	14	16
3	(Denmark) M Conrad-Petersen (Denmark) M P Kolding	21	21
(Republic of Ireland) J Magee (Republic of Ireland) S Magee	15	12
(Malaysia) Ong Y S (Malaysia) Teo E Y	17	17
(Indonesia) M Ahsan (Indonesia) B Angriawan	21	21
8	(Indonesia) A Pratama (Indonesia) R K Suwardi	21	21
Q1	(China) Huang KX (China) Wang YL	17	17
(Thailand) D Puavaranukroh (Thailand) K Kedren	21	21
Q3	(China) Liu C (China) Zheng SW	19	13

Second Round
(Thailand) B Issara (Thailand) N Puangpuapech	21	21
PFQ	(England) M Nottingham (England) H Towler	13	17
7	(Russia) V Ivanov (Russia) I Sozonov	21	21
(Japan) T Hoki (Japan) Y Kobayashi	17	19
3	(Denmark) M Conrad-Petersen (Denmark) M P Kolding	13	15
(Indonesia) M Ahsan (Indonesia) B Angriawan	21	21
8	(Indonesia) A Pratama (Indonesia) R K Suwardi	21	21
(Thailand) D Puavaranukroh (Thailand) K Kedren	17	17

Quarterfinals
(Thailand) B Issara (Thailand) N Puangpuapech	21	21
7	(Russia) V Ivanov (Russia) I Sozonov	14	14
(Indonesia) M Ahsan (Indonesia) B Angriawan	13	21	18
8	(Indonesia) A Pratama (Indonesia) R K Suwardi	21	14	21

Semifinals
(Thailand) B Issara (Thailand) N Puangpuapech	21	17	21
8	(Indonesia) A Pratama (Indonesia) R K Suwardi	18	21	19

=== Bottom half ===
First Round
Q4	(England) B Lane (England) S Vendy	17	21	17
(Chinese Taipei) Lee J-h (Chinese Taipei) Lee Y	21	17	21
(Germany) M Lamsfuss (Germany) M E Seidel	14	21	18
5	(Indonesia) M F Gideon (Indonesia) K S Sukamuljo	21	18	21
(South Korea) Chung E-s (South Korea) Kim D-y	21	21
Q2	(France) T J Popov (France) T Vallez	11	14
(Denmark) K Astrup (Denmark) A S Rasmussen	21	21
4	(Malaysia) Goh V S (Malaysia) Tan W K	19	17
(Japan) T Kamura (Japan) K Sonoda	21	21
(Germany) J R Jansen (Germany) J Zurwonne	17	13
(England) M Ellis (England) C Langridge	21	21
6	(China) Li JH (China) Liu YC	18	18
(Chinese Taipei) Chen H-l (Chinese Taipei) Wang C-l	21	21
(Poland) M Bochat (Poland) A Cwalina	19	15
(Indonesia) R A Saputro (Indonesia) H Setiawan	17	24	17
2	(Denmark) M Boe (Denmark) C Mogensen	21	22	21

Second Round
(Chinese Taipei) Lee J-h (Chinese Taipei) Lee Y	19	21	21
5	(Indonesia) M F Gideon (Indonesia) K S Sukamuljo	21	16	14
(South Korea) Chung E-s (South Korea) Kim D-y	23	21	15
(Denmark) K Astrup (Denmark) A S Rasmussen	25	15	21
(Japan) T Kamura (Japan) K Sonoda	21	18	21
(England) M Ellis (England) C Langridge	9	21	13
(Chinese Taipei) Chen H-l (Chinese Taipei) Wang C-l	18	18
2	(Denmark) M Boe (Denmark) C Mogensen	21	21

Quarterfinals
(Chinese Taipei) Lee J-h (Chinese Taipei) Lee Y	19	19
(Denmark) K Astrup (Denmark) A S Rasmussen	21	21
(Japan) T Kamura (Japan) K Sonoda	16	12
2	(Denmark) M Boe (Denmark) C Mogensen	21	21

Semifinals
(Denmark) K Astrup (Denmark) A S Rasmussen	19	17
2	(Denmark) M Boe (Denmark) C Mogensen	21	21

=== Finals ===
Semifinals
(Thailand) Bodin Issara (Thailand) Nipitphon Puangpuapech	21	17	21
8	(Indonesia) Angga Pratama (Indonesia) Ricky Karanda Suwardi	18	21	19
(Denmark) Kim Astrup (Denmark) Anders Skaarup Rasmussen	19	17
2	(Denmark) Mathias Boe (Denmark) Carsten Mogensen	21	21

Final
(Thailand) Bodin Issara (Thailand) Nipitphon Puangpuapech	21	18	0^{r}
2	(Denmark) Mathias Boe (Denmark) Carsten Mogensen	19	21	3

== Women's doubles ==
=== Seeds ===
1. (Japan) Misaki Matsutomo / Ayaka Takahashi (semifinals)
2. (South Korea) Jung Kyung-eun / Shin Seung-chan (second round)
3. (Denmark) Christinna Pedersen / Kamilla Rytter Juhl (quarterfinals)
4. (Indonesia) Nitya Krishinda Maheswari / Greysia Polii (quarterfinals)
5. (China) Luo Ying / Luo Yu (second round)
6. (South Korea) Chang Ye-na / Lee So-hee (final)
7. (Japan) Naoko Fukuman / Kurumi Yonao (quarterfinals)
8. (Netherlands) Eefje Muskens / Selena Piek (withdrew)

=== Top half ===
First Round
1	(Japan) M Matsutomo (Japan) A Takahashi	21	21
(Indonesia) A S Awanda (Indonesia) N K Mahadewi Istirani	13	18
Q3	(South Korea) Kim H-r (South Korea) Yoo H-w	21	21
(Germany) L Efler (Germany) E Janssens	8	9
7	(Japan) N Fukuman (Japan) K Yonao	21	21
(Malaysia) Vivian Hoo K M (Malaysia) Woon K W	16	16
Q1	(France) J Piron (France) M Ruano	12	15
(Germany) J Goliszewski (Germany) L Kaepplein	21	21
3	(Denmark) C Pedersen (Denmark) K Rytter Juhl	21	21
(England) S Brown (England) L Smith	11	8
(Thailand) P Supajirakul (Thailand) S Taerattanachai	21	21
(Russia) A Chervyakova (Russia) O Morozova	11	8
5	(China) Luo Y (China) Luo Y	21	21
(Indonesia) T R Nuraidah (Indonesia) R A Pradipta	13	11
(China) Chen QC (China) Jia YF	21	21
(South Korea) Chae Y-j (South Korea) Kim S-y	15	18

Second Round
1	(Japan) M Matsutomo (Japan) A Takahashi	21	21
Q3	(South Korea) Kim H-r (South Korea) Yoo H-w	12	16
7	(Japan) N Fukuman (Japan) K Yonao	21	21
(Germany) J Goliszewski (Germany) L Kaepplein	9	13
3	(Denmark) C Pedersen (Denmark) K Rytter Juhl	21	21
(Thailand) P Supajirakul (Thailand) S Taerattanachai	14	19
5	(China) Luo Y (China) Luo Y	18	15
(China) Chen QC (China) Jia YF	21	21

Quarterfinals
1	(Japan) M Matsutomo (Japan) A Takahashi	21	21
7	(Japan) N Fukuman (Japan) K Yonao	13	14
3	(Denmark) C Pedersen (Denmark) K Rytter Juhl	19	19
(China) Chen QC (China) Jia YF	21	21

Semifinals
1	(Japan) M Matsutomo (Japan) A Takahashi	21	27	15
(China) Chen QC (China) Jia YF	16	29	21

=== Bottom half ===
First Round
PFQ	(China) Huang DP (China) Li YH	21	21
(England) H Olver (England) J Pugh	9	13
(Switzerland) N Fankhauser (Malaysia) S Saniru	16	12
PFQ	(Chinese Taipei) Chiang K-h (Chinese Taipei) Hung S-h	21	21
PFQ	(Chinese Taipei) Chiang M-h (Chinese Taipei) Hsu Y-c	25	21
(China) Ma J (China) Zhong QX	23	16
PFQ	(France) E Lefel (France) A Tran	21	11	12
4	(Indonesia) N K Maheswari (Indonesia) G Polii	19	21	21
(Thailand) J Kititharakul (Thailand) R Prajongjai	21	19	15
Q2	(Germany) I Herttrich (Germany) C Nelte	18	21	21
Q4	(France) M Ligneau (France) O Sricharoen Liger	4	10
6	(South Korea) Chang Y-n (South Korea) Lee S-h	21	21
(Indonesia) D D Haris (Indonesia) R E Putri Sari	21	21
(Bulgaria) G Stoeva (Bulgaria) S Stoeva	17	7
(Netherlands) C Seinen (Netherlands) I Tabeling	9	15
2	(South Korea) Jung K-e (South Korea) Shin S-c	21	21

Second Round
PFQ	(China) Huang DP (China) Li YH	21	21
PFQ	(Chinese Taipei) Chiang K-h (Chinese Taipei) Hung S-h	16	13
PFQ	(Chinese Taipei) Chiang M-h (Chinese Taipei) Hsu Y-c	9	18
4	(Indonesia) N K Maheswari (Indonesia) G Polii	21	21
Q2	(Germany) I Herttrich (Germany) C Nelte	17	10
6	(South Korea) Chang Y-n (South Korea) Lee S-h	21	21
(Indonesia) D D Haris (Indonesia) R E Putri Sari	18	21	21
2	(South Korea) Jung K-e (South Korea) Shin S-c	21	8	11

Quarterfinals
PFQ	(China) Huang DP (China) Li YH	18	21	21
4	(Indonesia) N K Maheswari (Indonesia) G Polii	21	12	13
6	(South Korea) Chang Y-n (South Korea) Lee S-h	21	21
(Indonesia) D D Haris (Indonesia) R E Putri Sari	9	13

Semifinals
PFQ	(China) Huang DP (China) Li YH	14	18
6	(South Korea) Chang Y-n (South Korea) Lee S-h	21	21

=== Finals ===
Semifinals
1	(Japan) Misaki Matsutomo (Japan) Ayaka Takahashi	21	27	15
(China) Chen Qingchen (China) Jia Yifan	16	29	21
PFQ	(China) Huang Dongping (China) Li Yinhui	14	18
6	(South Korea) Chang Ye-na (South Korea) Lee So-hee	21	21

Final
(China) Chen Qingchen (China) Jia Yifan	21	21
6	(South Korea) Chang Ye-na (South Korea) Lee So-hee	16	17

== Mixed doubles ==
=== Seeds ===
1. (South Korea) Ko Sung-hyun / Kim Ha-na (final)
2. (Indonesia) Praveen Jordan / Debby Susanto (quarterfinals)
3. (Denmark) Joachim Fischer Nielsen / Christinna Pedersen (semifinals)
4. (Malaysia) Chan Peng Soon / Goh Liu Ying (withdrew)
5. (England) Chris Adcock / Gabrielle Adcock (first round)
6. (China) Lu Kai / Huang Yaqiong (first round)
7. (China) Zheng Siwei / Chen Qingchen (champion)
8. (China) Zhang Nan / Li Yinhui (semifinals)

=== Top half ===
First Round
1	(South Korea) Ko S-h (South Korea) Kim H-n	22	19	21
(Hong Kong) Lee C H (Hong Kong) Chau H W	20	21	15
(Indonesia) H Faisal (Indonesia) S D Aulia	21	13
(South Korea) Kim D-y (South Korea) Yoo H-w	23	21
6	(China) Lu K (China) Huang YQ	14	17
(Japan) K Kazuno (Japan) A Kurihara	21	21
(Indonesia) A E Prasetya (Indonesia) A Saufika	20	16
Q2	(Scotland) A Hall (England) L Smith	22	21
3	(Denmark) J Fischer Nielsen (Denmark) C Pedersen	21	21
(England) M Nottingham (England) E Westwood	19	14
Q1	(Netherlands) R Tabeling (Netherlands) C Seinen	21	19	21
PFQ	(Germany) M E Seidel (Germany) L Efler	19	21	15
5	(England) C Adcock (England) G Adcock	18	16
(South Korea) Yoo Y-s (South Korea) Chang Y-n	21	21
Q3	(Chinese Taipei) Lee Y (Chinese Taipei) Hsu Y-c	21	22
PFQ	(Chinese Taipei) Wang C-l (Chinese Taipei) Chiang K-h	17	20

Second Round
1	(South Korea) Ko S-h (South Korea) Kim H-n	21	21
(South Korea) Kim D-y (South Korea) Yoo H-w	11	13
(Japan) K Kazuno (Japan) A Kurihara	21	21
Q2	(Scotland) A Hall (England) L Smith	17	15
3	(Denmark) J Fischer Nielsen (Denmark) C Pedersen	21	21
Q1	(Netherlands) R Tabeling (Netherlands) C Seinen	14	8
(South Korea) Yoo Y-s (South Korea) Chang Y-n	21	21
Q3	(Chinese Taipei) Lee Y (Chinese Taipei) Hsu Y-c	7	16

Quarterfinals
1	(South Korea) Ko S-h (South Korea) Kim H-n	22	15	21
(Japan) K Kazuno (Japan) A Kurihara	20	21	15
3	(Denmark) J Fischer Nielsen (Denmark) C Pedersen	21	21
(South Korea) Yoo Y-s (South Korea) Chang Y-n	15	17

Semifinals
1	(South Korea) Ko S-h (South Korea) Kim H-n	21	21
3	(Denmark) J Fischer Nielsen (Denmark) C Pedersen	18	19

=== Bottom half ===
First Round
Q4	(South Korea) Choi S-g (South Korea) Chae Y-j	21	21
(Poland) R Mateusiak (Poland) N Zieba	8	19
(Germany) M Lamsfuss (Germany) I Herttrich	15	11
8	(China) Zhang N (China) Li YH	21	21
(China) Wang YL (China) Huang DP	21	16	16
(Thailand) B Issara (Thailand) S Amitrapai	18	21	21
(Indonesia) R Alexander (Indonesia) M D Oktavianti	21	21
PFQ	(France) B Careme (Switzerland) S Jaquet	19	12
(Thailand) D Puavaranukroh (Thailand) S Taerattanachai	21	21
(Sweden) N Ruponen (Sweden) A Hogstrom	11	13
(Chinese Taipei) Chang K-c (Chinese Taipei) Chang H-t	10	16
7	(China) Zheng SW (China) Chen QC	21	21
(Malaysia) Tan K M (Malaysia) Lai P J	21	21
PFQ	(England) B Lane (England) J Pugh	9	16
(Republic of Ireland) S Magee (Republic of Ireland) C Magee	23	13
2	(Indonesia) P Jordan (Indonesia) D Susanto	25	21

Second Round
Q4	(South Korea) Choi S-g (South Korea) Chae Y-j	19	14
8	(China) Zhang N (China) Li YH	21	21
(Thailand) B Issara (Thailand) S Amitrapai	21	21
(Indonesia) R Alexander (Indonesia) M D Oktavianti	11	18
(Thailand) D Puavaranukroh (Thailand) S Taerattanachai	16	21	15
7	(China) Zheng SW (China) Chen QC	21	14	21
(Malaysia) Tan K M (Malaysia) Lai P J	20	21	16
2	(Indonesia) P Jordan (Indonesia) D Susanto	22	14	21

Quarterfinals
8	(China) Zhang N (China) Li YH	21	23
(Thailand) B Issara (Thailand) S Amitrapai	14	21
7	(China) Zheng SW (China) Chen QC	21	21
2	(Indonesia) P Jordan (Indonesia) D Susanto	18	14

Semifinals
8	(China) Zhang N (China) Li YH	15	19
7	(China) Zheng SW (China) Chen QC	21	21

=== Finals ===
Semifinals
1	(South Korea) Ko Sung-hyun (South Korea) Kim Ha-na	21	21
3	(Denmark) Joachim Fischer Nielsen (Denmark) Christinna Pedersen	18	19
8	(China) Zhang Nan (China) Li Yinhui	15	19
7	(China) Zheng Siwei (China) Chen Qingchen	21	21

Final
1	(South Korea) Ko Sung-hyun (South Korea) Kim Ha-na	16	15
7	(China) Zheng Siwei (China) Chen Qingchen	21	21

Preceded by 2015 French Super Series	French Open	Succeeded by 2017 French Super Series
Preceded by 2016 Denmark Super Series Premier	BWF Super Series; 2016 BWF Season	Succeeded by 2016 China Open Super Series Premier
