= 2016 BWF Super Series =

Tournament details
- Dates: 8 March – 18 December
- Edition: 10th

The 2016 BWF Super Series, officially known as the 2016 Metlife BWF Super Series for sponsorship reasons, was the tenth season of the BWF Super Series.

== Schedule ==
Below is the schedule released by the Badminton World Federation:

Tour	Official title	Venue	City	Date		Prize money USD	Report
Tour	Official title	Venue	City	Start	Finish	Prize money USD	Report
1	All England Super Series Premier	Arena Birmingham	Birmingham	March 08	March 13	550,000	Report
2	India Open Super Series	Siri Fort Sports Complex	New Delhi	March 29	April 03	300,000	Report
3	Malaysia Open Super Series Premier	Malawati Stadium	Shah Alam	April 05	April 10	550,000	Report
4	Singapore Super Series	Singapore Indoor Stadium	Singapore	April 12	April 17	350,000	Report
5	Indonesia Open Super Series Premier	Istora Senayan	Jakarta	May 30	June 5	900,000	Report
6	(Australia) Australian Super Series	State Sports Centre	Sydney	June 07	June 12	750,000	Report
7	Japan Super Series	Tokyo Metropolitan Gymnasium	Tokyo	September 20	September 25	300,000	Report
8	(South Korea) Korea Super Series	Seongnam Indoor Arena	Seongnam	September 27	October 2	600,000	Report
9	Denmark Super Series Premier	Odense Sports Park	Odense	October 18	October 23	700,000	Report
10	(France) French Super Series	Stade Pierre de Coubertin	Paris	October 25	October 30	300,000	Report
11	China Open Super Series Premier	Haixia Olympic Sports Center	Fuzhou	November 15	November 20	700,000	Report
12	Hong Kong Super Series	Hong Kong Coliseum	Kowloon	November 22	November 27	400,000	Report
13	(United Arab Emirates) Super Series Masters Finals	Hamdan Sports Complex	Dubai	December 14	December 18	1,000,000	Report

Super Series Premier
Super Series Finals

== Results ==
=== Winners ===
Tour	Men's singles	Women's singles	Men's doubles	Women's doubles	Mixed doubles
England	(China) Lin Dan	(Japan) Nozomi Okuhara	(Russia) Vladimir Ivanov (Russia) Ivan Sozonov	(Japan) Misaki Matsutomo (Japan) Ayaka Takahashi	(Indonesia) Praveen Jordan (Indonesia) Debby Susanto
India	(Japan) Kento Momota	(Thailand) Ratchanok Intanon	(Indonesia) Marcus Fernaldi Gideon (Indonesia) Kevin Sanjaya Sukamuljo	(Japan) Misaki Matsutomo (Japan) Ayaka Takahashi	(China) Lu Kai (China) Huang Yaqiong
Malaysia	(Malaysia) Lee Chong Wei	(Thailand) Ratchanok Intanon	(South Korea) Kim Gi-jung (South Korea) Kim Sa-rang	(China) Tang Yuanting (China) Yu Yang	(Indonesia) Tontowi Ahmad (Indonesia) Liliyana Natsir
Singapore	(Indonesia) Sony Dwi Kuncoro	(Thailand) Ratchanok Intanon	(China) Fu Haifeng (China) Zhang Nan	(Indonesia) Nitya Krishinda Maheswari (Indonesia) Greysia Polii	(South Korea) Ko Sung-hyun (South Korea) Kim Ha-na
Indonesia	(Malaysia) Lee Chong Wei	(Chinese Taipei) Tai Tzu-ying	(South Korea) Lee Yong-dae (South Korea) Yoo Yeon-seong	(Japan) Misaki Matsutomo (Japan) Ayaka Takahashi	(China) Xu Chen (China) Ma Jin
Australia	(Denmark) Hans-Kristian Vittinghus	(India) Saina Nehwal	(Indonesia) Marcus Fernaldi Gideon (Indonesia) Kevin Sanjaya Sukamuljo	(China) Bao Yixin (China) Chen Qingchen	(China) Lu Kai (China) Huang Yaqiong
Japan	(Malaysia) Lee Chong Wei	(China) He Bingjiao	(China) Li Junhui (China) Liu Yuchen	(Denmark) Christinna Pedersen (Denmark) Kamilla Rytter Juhl	(China) Zheng Siwei (China) Chen Qingchen
(South Korea) Korea	(China) Qiao Bin	(Japan) Akane Yamaguchi	(South Korea) Lee Yong-dae (South Korea) Yoo Yeon-seong	(South Korea) Jung Kyung-eun (South Korea) Shin Seung-chan	(South Korea) Ko Sung-hyun (South Korea) Kim Ha-na
Denmark	(Thailand) Tanongsak Saensomboonsuk	(Japan) Akane Yamaguchi	(Malaysia) Goh V Shem (Malaysia) Tan Wee Kiong	(Japan) Misaki Matsutomo (Japan) Ayaka Takahashi	(Denmark) Joachim Fischer Nielsen (Denmark) Christinna Pedersen
France	(China) Shi Yuqi	(China) He Bingjiao	(Denmark) Mathias Boe (Denmark) Carsten Mogensen	(China) Chen Qingchen (China) Jia Yifan	(China) Zheng Siwei (China) Chen Qingchen
China	(Denmark) Jan Ø. Jørgensen	(India) P. V. Sindhu	(Indonesia) Marcus Fernaldi Gideon (Indonesia) Kevin Sanjaya Sukamuljo	(South Korea) Chang Ye-na (South Korea) Lee So-hee	(Indonesia) Tontowi Ahmad (Indonesia) Liliyana Natsir
Hong Kong	(Hong Kong) Ng Ka Long	(Chinese Taipei) Tai Tzu-ying	(Japan) Takeshi Kamura (Japan) Keigo Sonoda	(Denmark) Christinna Pedersen (Denmark) Kamilla Rytter Juhl	(Indonesia) Tontowi Ahmad (Indonesia) Liliyana Natsir
(United Arab Emirates) Masters Finals	(Denmark) Viktor Axelsen	(Chinese Taipei) Tai Tzu-ying	(Malaysia) Goh V Shem (Malaysia) Tan Wee Kiong	(China) Chen Qingchen (China) Jia Yifan	(China) Zheng Siwei (China) Chen Qingchen

=== Performance by countries ===
Tabulated below are the Super Series performances based on countries. Only countries who have won a title are listed:

Team	ENG	IND	MAS	SIN	INA	AUS	JPN	KOR	DEN	FRA	CHN	HKG	SSF	Total
China	1	1	1	1	1	2	3	1		4			2	17
Indonesia	1	1	1	2		1					2	1		9
Japan	2	2			1			1	2			1		9
Denmark						1	1		1	1	1	1	1	7
Korea			1	1	1			3			1			7
Malaysia			1		1		1		1				1	5
Thailand		1	1	1					1					4
Chinese Taipei					1							1	1	3
India						1					1			2
Hong Kong												1		1
Russia	1													1

== Finals ==
=== England ===
Category	Winners	Runners-up	Score
Men's singles	(China) Lin Dan	(China) Tian Houwei	21–9, 21–10
Women's singles	(Japan) Nozomi Okuhara	(China) Wang Shixian	21–11, 16–21, 21–19
Men's doubles	(Russia) Vladimir Ivanov / Ivan Sozonov	(Japan) Hiroyuki Endo / Kenichi Hayakawa	21–23, 21–18, 21–16
Women's doubles	(Japan) Misaki Matsutomo / Ayaka Takahashi	(China) Tang Yuanting / Yu Yang	21–10, 21–12
Mixed doubles	(Indonesia) Praveen Jordan / Debby Susanto	(Denmark) Joachim Fischer Nielsen / Christinna Pedersen	21–12, 21–17

=== India Open ===
Category	Winners	Runners-up	Score
Men's singles	(Japan) Kento Momota	(Denmark) Viktor Axelsen	21–15, 21–17
Women's singles	(Thailand) Ratchanok Intanon	(China) Li Xuerui	21–17, 21–18
Men's doubles	(Indonesia) Marcus Fernaldi Gideon / Kevin Sanjaya Sukamuljo	(Indonesia) Angga Pratama / Ricky Karanda Suwardi	21–17, 21–13
Women's doubles	(Japan) Misaki Matsutomo / Ayaka Takahashi	(Japan) Naoko Fukuman / Kurumi Yonao	21–18, 21–18
Mixed doubles	(China) Lu Kai / Huang Yaqiong	(Indonesia) Riky Widianto / Richi Puspita Dili	21–13, 21–16

=== Malaysia ===
Category	Winners	Runners-up	Score
Men's singles	(Malaysia) Lee Chong Wei	(China) Chen Long	21–13, 21–8
Women's singles	(Thailand) Ratchanok Intanon	(Chinese Taipei) Tai Tzu-ying	21–14, 21–15
Men's doubles	(South Korea) Kim Gi-jung / Kim Sa-rang	(China) Chai Biao / Hong Wei	21–19, 21–15
Women's doubles	(China) Tang Yuanting / Yu Yang	(South Korea) Jung Kyung-eun / Shin Seung-chan	21–11, 21–17
Mixed doubles	(Indonesia) Tontowi Ahmad / Liliyana Natsir	(Malaysia) Chan Peng Soon / Goh Liu Ying	23–21, 13–21, 21–16

=== Singapore ===
Category	Winners	Runners-up	Score
Men's singles	(Indonesia) Sony Dwi Kuncoro	(South Korea) Son Wan-ho	21–16, 13–21, 21–14
Women's singles	(Thailand) Ratchanok Intanon	(China) Sun Yu	18–21, 21–11, 21–14
Men's doubles	(China) Fu Haifeng / Zhang Nan	(Japan) Takeshi Kamura / Keigo Sonoda	21–11, 22–20
Women's doubles	(Indonesia) Nitya Krishinda Maheswari / Greysia Polii	(Japan) Misaki Matsutomo / Ayaka Takahashi	walkover
Mixed doubles	(South Korea) Ko Sung-hyun / Kim Ha-na	(China) Xu Chen / Ma Jin	21–17, 21–14

=== Indonesia ===
Category	Winners	Runners-up	Score
Men's singles	(Malaysia) Lee Chong Wei	(Denmark) Jan Ø. Jørgensen	17–21, 21–19, 21–17
Women's singles	(Chinese Taipei) Tai Tzu-ying	(China) Wang Yihan	21–17, 21–8
Men's doubles	(South Korea) Lee Yong-dae / Yoo Yeon-seong	(China) Chai Biao / Hong Wei	13–21, 21–13, 21–16
Women's doubles	(Japan) Misaki Matsutomo / Ayaka Takahashi	(China) Tang Yuanting / Yu Yang	21–15, 8–21, 21–15
Mixed doubles	(China) Xu Chen / Ma Jin	(South Korea) Ko Sung-hyun / Kim Ha-na	21–15, 16–21, 21–13

=== Australia ===
Category	Winners	Runners-up	Score
Men's singles	(Denmark) Hans-Kristian Vittinghus	(South Korea) Jeon Hyeok-jin	21–16, 19–21, 21–11
Women's singles	(India) Saina Nehwal	(China) Sun Yu	11–21, 21–14, 21–19
Men's doubles	(Indonesia) Marcus Fernaldi Gideon / Kevin Sanjaya Sukamuljo	(Indonesia) Angga Pratama / Ricky Karanda Suwardi	21–14, 21–15
Women's doubles	(China) Bao Yixin / Chen Qingchen	(Indonesia) Nitya Krishinda Maheswari / Greysia Polii	23–21, 21–17
Mixed doubles	(China) Lu Kai / Huang Yaqiong	(China) Zheng Siwei / Chen Qingchen	21–18, 21–14

=== Japan ===
Category	Winners	Runners-up	Score
Men's singles	(Malaysia) Lee Chong Wei	(Denmark) Jan Ø. Jørgensen	21–18, 15–21, 21–16
Women's singles	(China) He Bingjiao	(China) Sun Yu	21–14, 7–21, 21–18
Men's doubles	(China) Li Junhui / Liu Yuchen	(South Korea) Kim Gi-jung / Ko Sung-hyun	21–12, 21–12
Women's doubles	(Denmark) Christinna Pedersen / Kamilla Rytter Juhl	(Japan) Misaki Matsutomo / Ayaka Takahashi	19–21, 21–18, 21–12
Mixed doubles	(China) Zheng Siwei / Chen Qingchen	(South Korea) Ko Sung-hyun / Kim Ha-na	21–10, 21–15

=== Korea ===
Category	Winners	Runners-up	Score
Men's singles	(China) Qiao Bin	(South Korea) Son Wan-ho	21–11, 21–23, 21–7
Women's singles	(Japan) Akane Yamaguchi	(South Korea) Sung Ji-hyun	20–22, 21–15, 21–18
Men's doubles	(South Korea) Lee Yong-dae / Yoo Yeon-seong	(China) Li Junhui / Liu Yuchen	16–21, 22–20, 21–18
Women's doubles	(South Korea) Jung Kyung-eun / Shin Seung-chan	(China) Luo Ying / Luo Yu	21–13, 21–11
Mixed doubles	(South Korea) Ko Sung-hyun / Kim Ha-na	(China) Zheng Siwei / Chen Qingchen	21–14, 21–19

=== Denmark ===
Category	Winners	Runners-up	Score
Men's singles	(Thailand) Tanongsak Saensomboonsuk	(South Korea) Son Wan-ho	21–13, 23–21
Women's singles	(Japan) Akane Yamaguchi	(Chinese Taipei) Tai Tzu-ying	19–21, 21–14, 21–12
Men's doubles	(Malaysia) Goh V Shem / Tan Wee Kiong	(Thailand) Bodin Isara / Nipitphon Phuangphuapet	14–21, 22–20, 21–19
Women's doubles	(Japan) Misaki Matsutomo / Ayaka Takahashi	(South Korea) Jung Kyung-eun / Shin Seung-chan	19–21, 21–11, 21–16
Mixed doubles	(Denmark) Joachim Fischer Nielsen / Christinna Pedersen	(China) Zheng Siwei / Chen Qingchen	21–16, 22–20

=== France ===
Category	Winners	Runners-up	Score
Men's singles	(China) Shi Yuqi	(South Korea) Lee Hyun-il	21–16, 21–19
Women's singles	(China) He Bingjiao	(United States) Zhang Beiwen	21–9, 21–9
Men's doubles	(Denmark) Mathias Boe / Carsten Mogensen	(Thailand) Bodin Issara / Nipitphon Puangpuapech	19–21, 21–18, 3–0 retired
Women's doubles	(China) Chen Qingchen / Jia Yifan	(South Korea) Chang Ye-na / Lee So-hee	21–16, 21–17
Mixed doubles	(China) Zheng Siwei / Chen Qingchen	(South Korea) Ko Sung-hyun / Kim Ha-na	21–16, 21–15

=== China ===
Category	Winners	Runners-up	Score
Men's singles	(Denmark) Jan Ø. Jørgensen	(China) Chen Long	22–20, 21–13
Women's singles	(India) P. V. Sindhu	(China) Sun Yu	21–11, 17–21, 21–11
Men's doubles	(Indonesia) Marcus Fernaldi Gideon / Kevin Sanjaya Sukamuljo	(Denmark) Mathias Boe / Carsten Mogensen	21–18, 22–20
Women's doubles	(South Korea) Chang Ye-na / Lee So-hee	(China) Huang Dongping / Li Yinhui	13–21, 21–14, 21–17
Mixed doubles	(Indonesia) Tontowi Ahmad / Liliyana Natsir	(China) Zhang Nan / Li Yinhui	21–13, 22–24, 21–16

=== Hong Kong ===
Category	Winners	Runners-up	Score
Men's singles	(Hong Kong) Ng Ka Long	(India) Sameer Verma	21–14, 10–21, 21–11
Women's singles	(Chinese Taipei) Tai Tzu-ying	(India) P. V. Sindhu	21–15, 21–17
Men's doubles	(Japan) Takeshi Kamura / Keigo Sonoda	(Denmark) Mathias Boe / Carsten Mogensen	21–19, 21–19
Women's doubles	(Denmark) Kamilla Rytter Juhl / Christinna Pedersen	(China) Huang Dongping / Li Yinhui	21–19, 21–10
Mixed doubles	(Indonesia) Tontowi Ahmad / Liliyana Natsir	(Indonesia) Praveen Jordan / Debby Susanto	21–19, 21–17

=== Masters Finals ===
Category	Winners	Runners-up	Score
Men's singles	(Denmark) Viktor Axelsen	(China) Tian Houwei	21–14, 6–21, 21–17
Women's singles	(Chinese Taipei) Tai Tzu-ying	(South Korea) Sung Ji-hyun	21–14, 21–13
Men's doubles	(Malaysia) Goh V Shem / Tan Wee Kiong	(Japan) Takeshi Kamura / Keigo Sonoda	21–14, 21–19
Women's doubles	(China) Chen Qingchen / Jia Yifan	(Japan) Misaki Matsutomo / Ayaka Takahashi	21–15, 13–21, 21–17
Mixed doubles	(China) Zheng Siwei / Chen Qingchen	(England) Chris Adcock / Gabby Adcock	21–12, 21–12
