= Qiao Bin =

Chinese badminton player (born 1992)

Qiao Bin 乔斌
Personal information
- Born: 17 November 1992 (age 33) Xiangtan, Hunan, China
- Years active: 2009–2018
- Spouse: Li Xuerui (m. 2019)

Sport
- Country: China
- Sport: Badminton
- Handedness: Right

Men's singles
- Highest ranking: 14 (25 May 2017)
- BWF profile
Medal record
Men's badminton
Representing China
Thomas Cup
Gold medal – first place	2018 Bangkok	Men's team
Asian Games
Gold medal – first place	2018 Jakarta-Palembang	Men's team
Asia Mixed Team Championships
Bronze medal – third place	2017 Ho Chi Minh	Mixed team
Asia Team Championships
Silver medal – second place	2018 Alor Setar	Men's team
Summer Universiade
Silver medal – second place	2015 Gwangju	Mixed team

Qiao Bin (Chinese: 乔斌; pinyin: Qiáo Bīn, born 17 November 1992) is a Chinese badminton player. He won his first senior international title at the China International tournament. In 2016, Qiao who ranked 41 at that time clinched the Superseries title at the Korea Open, defeated the sixth seed, world number eight, Son Wan-ho in the final.

== Achievements ==
=== BWF Superseries ===
The BWF Superseries, launched on 14 December 2006 and implemented in 2007, is a series of elite badminton tournaments sanctioned by the Badminton World Federation (BWF). BWF Superseries has two levels: Superseries and Superseries Premier. A season of Superseries features twelve tournaments around the world, introduced in 2011, with successful players invited to the Superseries Finals held at the year's end.

Men's singles

Year	Tournament	Opponent	Score	Result
2016	Korea Open	(South Korea) Son Wan-ho	21–11, 21–23, 21–7	(gold) Winner

BWF Superseries Finals tournament
BWF Superseries Premier tournament
BWF Superseries tournament

=== BWF Grand Prix ===
The BWF Grand Prix has two level such as Grand Prix and Grand Prix Gold. It is a series of badminton tournaments, sanctioned by Badminton World Federation (BWF) since 2007.

Men's singles

Year	Tournament	Opponent	Score	Result
2017	China Masters	(China) Tian Houwei	15–21, 21–15, 16–21	(silver) Runner-up
2016	Chinese Taipei Open	(Chinese Taipei) Chou Tien-chen	18–21, 17–21	(silver) Runner-up
2015	New Zealand Open	(South Korea) Lee Hyun-il	12–21, 14–21	(silver) Runner-up

BWF Grand Prix Gold tournament
BWF Grand Prix tournament

=== BWF International Challenge/Series ===
Men's singles

Year	Tournament	Opponent	Score	Result
2015	China International	(Japan) Kazumasa Sakai	21–14, 21–12	(gold) Winner

BWF International Challenge tournament
BWF International Series tournament
