= Hung Shih-han =

Taiwanese badminton player (born 1990)

Hung Shih-han 洪詩涵
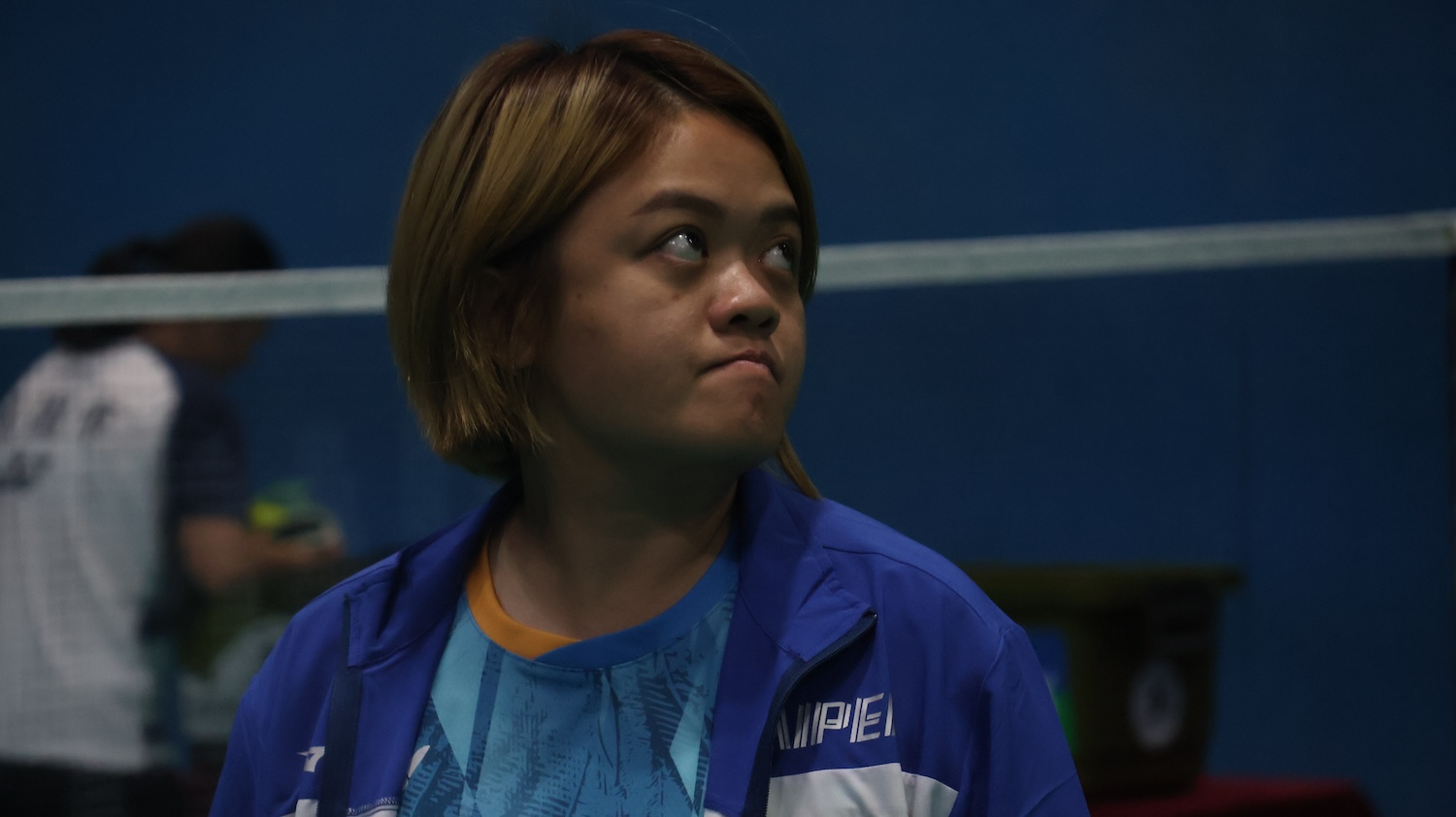

Personal information
- Born: 18 January 1990 (age 36)
- Height: 1.67 m (5 ft 6 in)
- Weight: 61 kg (134 lb)

Sport
- Country: Taiwan
- Sport: Badminton
- Handedness: Right

Women's singles & doubles
- Highest ranking: 57 (WS 19 November 2009); 24 (WD 6 April 2017); 147 (XD 15 October 2009)
- BWF profile

Hung Shih-han (Chinese: 洪詩涵; born 18 January 1990) is a Taiwanese badminton player who competed at the 2010 Guangzhou Asian Games. In 2008, she won the Hellas International Series tournament in the women's singles event after beat Dimitria Popstoikova of Bulgaria. In 2014, she also won the Vietnam International Challenge tournament.

== Achievements ==
=== BWF International Challenge/Series ===
Women's singles
Year	Tournament	Opponent	Score	Result
2014	Vietnam International	(China) Jiang Yujing	21–18, 21–15	(gold) Winner
2008	Hellas International	(Bulgaria) Dimitria Popstoykova	21–16, 21–14	(gold) Winner
2008	Vietnam International	(Malaysia) Lydia Cheah Li Ya	20–22, 15–21	(silver) Runner-up

Women's doubles
Year	Tournament	Partner	Opponent	Score	Result
2018	Yonex / K&D Graphics International	(Chinese Taipei) Yu Chien-hui	(Canada) Rachel Honderich (Canada) Kristen Tsai	19–21, 15–21	(silver) Runner-up

BWF International Challenge tournament
BWF International Series tournament
BWF Future Series tournament
