= Tian Houwei =

Chinese badminton player

Tian Houwei 田厚威
Personal information
- Born: 11 January 1992 (age 34) Fuzhou, Fujian, China
- Height: 1.79 m (5 ft 10 in)
- Weight: 70 kg (154 lb; 11 st 0 lb)

Sport
- Country: China
- Sport: Badminton
- Handedness: Left

Men's singles
- Career record: 126 wins, 68 losses
- Highest ranking: 6 (28 April 2016)
- BWF profile
Medal record
Men's badminton
Representing China
Thomas Cup
Bronze medal – third place	2014 New Delhi	Men's team
Asian Championships
Silver medal – second place	2015 Wuhan	Men's singles
Bronze medal – third place	2016 Wuhan	Men's singles
Asian Games
Silver medal – second place	2014 Inchoen	Men's team
Summer Universiade
Silver medal – second place	2013 Kazan	Mixed team
World Junior Championships
Gold medal – first place	2009 Alor Setar	Boys' singles
Gold medal – first place	2009 Alor Setar	Mixed team
Asian Junior Championships
Gold medal – first place	2009 Kuala Lumpur	Boys' singles
Silver medal – second place	2009 Kuala Lumpur	Mixed team

Tian Houwei
- Traditional Chinese: 田厚威
- Simplified Chinese: 田厚威
Transcriptions
Standard Mandarin
- Hanyu Pinyin: Tián Hòuwēi

Tian Houwei (Chinese: 田厚威; pinyin: Tián Hòuwēi; born 11 January 1992) is a badminton player from China. He was the 2009 World and Asian Junior Champions in the boys' singles event. Tian was part of the Chinese national team that won the silver medals at the 2013 Summer Universiade and 2014 Asian Games.

== Achievements ==
=== Asian Championships ===
Men's singles
Year	Venue	Opponent	Score	Result
2015	Wuhan Sports Center Gymnasium; Wuhan, China	(China) Lin Dan	19–21, 8–21	Silver
2016	Wuhan Sports Center Gymnasium, Wuhan, China	(China) Chen Long	14–21, 16–21	Bronze

=== BWF World Junior Championships ===
Boys' singles
Year	Venue	Opponent	Score	Result
2009	Stadium Sultan Abdul Halim; Alor Setar, Malaysia	(Malaysia) Iskandar Zulkarnain Zainuddin	21–12, 21–17	Gold

=== Asian Junior Championships ===
Boys' singles
Year	Venue	Opponent	Score	Result
2009	Juara Stadium; Kuala Lumpur, Malaysia	(Malaysia) Iskandar Zulkarnain Zainuddin	21–11, 21–18	Gold

=== BWF Superseries ===
The BWF Superseries, launched on 14 December 2006 and implemented in 2007, is a series of elite badminton tournaments, sanctioned by Badminton World Federation (BWF). BWF Superseries has two level such as Superseries and Superseries Premier. A season of Superseries features twelve tournaments around the world, which introduced since 2011, with successful players invited to the Superseries Finals held at the year end.

Men's singles
Year	Tournament	Opponent	Score	Result
2015	Hong Kong Open	(Malaysia) Lee Chong Wei	16–21, 15–21	(silver) Runner up
2016	All England Open	(China) Lin Dan	9–21, 10–21	(silver) Runner up
2016	Dubai World Superseries Finals	(Denmark) Viktor Axelsen	14–21, 21–6, 17–21	(silver) Runner-up

BWF Super Series Finals tournament
BWF Super Series Premier tournament
BWF Super Series tournament

=== BWF Grand Prix ===
The BWF Grand Prix had two levels, the BWF Grand Prix and Grand Prix Gold. It was a series of badminton tournaments sanctioned by the Badminton World Federation (BWF) which was held from 2007 to 2017.

Men's singles
Year	Tournament	Opponent	Score	Result
2011	Russian Open	(China) Zhou Wenlong	18–21, 15–21	(silver) Runner-up
2013	Australian Open	(China) Xue Song	20–22, 21–13, 21–12	(gold) Winner
2013	London Grand Prix Gold	(Denmark) Hans-Kristian Vittinghus	22–20, 21–16	(gold) Winner
2014	Swiss Open	(Denmark) Viktor Axelsen	7–21, 21–14, 23–25	(silver) Runner-up
2014	China Masters	(China) Lin Dan	14–21, 9–21	(silver) Runner-up
2015	Macau Open	(South Korea) Jeon Hyeok-jin	11–21, 21–13, 21–23	(silver) Runner-up
2017	China Masters	(China) Qiao Bin	21–15, 15–21, 21–16	(gold) Winner

BWF Grand Prix Gold tournament
BWF Grand Prix tournament
