= 2015 Australian Super Series =

Tournament details
- Dates: 26 May 2015 – 31 May 2015
- Level: Super Series
- Total prize money: US$750,000
- Venue: State Sports Centre
- Location: Sydney, New South Wales, Australia

Champions
- Men's singles: (China) Chen Long
- Women's singles: (Spain) Carolina Marín
- Men's doubles: (South Korea) Lee Yong-dae (South Korea) Yoo Yeon-seong
- Women's doubles: (China) Ma Jin (China) Tang Yuanting
- Mixed doubles: (Hong Kong) Lee Chun Hei (Hong Kong) Chau Hoi Wah

The 2015 Australian Super Series was the fifth Super Series tournament of the 2015 BWF Super Series in badminton. The tournament was held in Sydney, Australia from 26 to 31 May 2015 with a total purse of $750,000.

== Players by nation ==
Nation	First round	Second round	Quarterfinals	Semifinals	Final
(Japan)	10	9	2	1	
(Indonesia)	6	5	1	1	
(Thailand)	6	4	1		
(Malaysia)	6	1	1		
(Germany)	6	1			
(Chinese Taipei)	5	4			
(India)	5	2	1		
(South Korea)	6	4	3	3	
(Hong Kong)	4	3	1		
(Netherlands)	4				
(France)	3	1			
(Denmark)	3		1	2	1
(England)	3		2		
(United States)	3				
(Australia)	3				
(Russia)	2	1			
(Republic of Ireland)	2				
(China)	1	5	4	3	4
(Scotland)	1				
(Canada)			1		

== Men's singles ==
=== Seeds ===
1. (China) Chen Long
2. (China) Lin Dan
3. (Denmark) Jan Ø. Jørgensen
4. (India) Srikanth Kidambi
5. (South Korea) Son Wan-ho
6. (China) Wang Zhengming
7. (Chinese Taipei) Chou Tien-chen
8. (Japan) Kento Momota

=== Top half ===
First Round
1	(China) Chen L	15	21	21
Q3	(India) R.M.V.Gurusaidutt	21	9	17
(Hong Kong) Hu Y	21	21
(Japan) S Sasaki	11	18
8	(Japan) K Momota	23	21
(Hong Kong) Wei N	21	17
(Hong Kong) Wong W K	23	21
(Republic of Ireland) S Evans	21	15
4	(India) Srikanth K.	14	21	22
(Denmark) H-K Vittinghus	21	8	20
PFQ	(Hong Kong) Ng K L	9	19
(China) Tian HW	21	21
7	(Chinese Taipei) Chou T-c	21	21
(Germany) M Zwiebler	14	18
(England) R Ouseph	21	21
(Japan) K Tago	11	14

Second Round
1	(China) Chen L	21	21
(Hong Kong) Hu Y	11	8
8	(Japan) K Momota	17	6
(Hong Kong) Wong W K	21	21
4	(India) Srikanth K.	21	17	13
(China) Tian HW	18	21	21
7	(Chinese Taipei) Chou T-c	17	21	16
(England) R Ouseph	21	12	21

Quarterfinals
1	(China) Chen L	21	21
(Hong Kong) Wong W K	14	13
(China) Tian HW	21	21
(England) R Ouseph	9	12

Semifinals
1	(China) Chen L	21	21
(China) Tian HW	14	19

=== Bottom half ===
First Round
(France) B Leverdez	7	21	21
(Indonesia) T Sugiarto	21	18	14
(India) K Parupalli	21	18	20
6	(China) Wang ZM	24	21	22
Q1	(Malaysia) Chong W F	14	9
(South Korea) Lee H-i	21	21
(Thailand) T Saensomboonsuk	17	14
3	(Denmark) J Ø Jørgensen	21	21
(Chinese Taipei) Hsu J-h	11	22	17
(Japan) T Ueda	21	20	21
Q4	(Thailand) B Ponsana	21	21
5	(South Korea) Son W-h	11	18
(China) Xue S	21	21
Q2	(Japan) K Nishimoto	13	15
(Denmark) V Axelsen	19	21	21
2	(China) Lin D	21	12	15

Second Round
(France) B Leverdez	17	21
6	(China) Wang ZM	21	23
(South Korea) Lee H-i	20	10
3	(Denmark) J Ø Jørgensen	22	21
(Japan) T Ueda	21	20	15
Q4	(Thailand) B Ponsana	17	22	21
(China) Xue S	19	21	14
(Denmark) V Axelsen	21	18	21

Quarterfinals
6	(China) Wang ZM	18	21	8
3	(Denmark) J Ø Jørgensen	21	16	21
Q4	(Thailand) B Ponsana	19	15
(Denmark) V Axelsen	21	21

Semifinals
3	(Denmark) J Ø Jørgensen	17	15
(Denmark) V Axelsen	21	21

=== Finals ===
Semifinals
1	(China) Chen Long	21	21
(China) Tian Houwei	14	19
3	(Denmark) Jan Ø. Jørgensen	17	15
(Denmark) Viktor Axelsen	21	21

Final
1	(China) Chen Long	21	14	21
(Denmark) Viktor Axelsen	12	21	18

== Women's singles ==
=== Seeds ===
1. (China) Li Xuerui
2. (India) Saina Nehwal
3. (Spain) Carolina Marín
4. (Chinese Taipei) Tai Tzu-ying
5. (China) Wang Shixian
6. (Thailand) Ratchanok Intanon
7. (South Korea) Sung Ji-hyun
8. (China) Wang Yihan

=== Top half ===
First Round
1	(China) Li XR	22	21
(Germany) K Schnaase	20	8
(Japan) M Mitani	21	21
Q2	(Malaysia) Tee J Y	8	11
7	(South Korea) Sung J-h	21	9	21
(Japan) S Sato	10	21	14
(Japan) A Yamaguchi	21	24	21
(Hong Kong) Yip P Y	11	26	14
3	(Spain) C Marín	21	18	21
(Thailand) N Jindapon	17	21	17
Q3	(China) Yao X	21	21
Q1	(Hong Kong) Cheung N Y	15	18
8	(China) Wang YH	18	21	25
(India) P.V. Sindhu	21	15	23
(Japan) S Takahashi	21	21
(South Korea) Kim H-m	19	7

Second Round
1	(China) Li XR	21	21
(Japan) M Mitani	16	14
7	(South Korea) Sung J-h	21	21
(Japan) A Yamaguchi	19	13
3	(Spain) C Marín	21	16	21
Q3	(China) Yao X	17	21	10
8	(China) Wang YH	21	21
(Japan) S Takahashi	13	17

Quarterfinals
1	(China) Li XR	17	21	17
7	(South Korea) Sung J-h	21	10	21
3	(Spain) C Marín	21	21
8	(China) Wang YH	7	18

Semifinals
7	(South Korea) Sung Ji-hyun	13	14
3	(Spain) C Marín	21	21

=== Bottom half ===
First Round
(Canada) M Li	21	21
(Japan) N Okuhara	17	19
(Japan) Y Hashimoto	21	21
6	(Thailand) R Intanon	15	18
(Thailand) P Buranaprasertsuk	15	19
(Chinese Taipei) Pai Y-p	21	21
(South Korea) Bae Y-j	13	21	21
4	(Chinese Taipei) Tai T-y	21	16	10
(Thailand) B Ongbumrungpan	21	21
(Scotland) K Gilmour	12	9
(Chinese Taipei) Hsu Y-c	21	4	7
5	(China) Wang SX	17	21	21
(China) Sun Y	21	21
(Japan) K Imabeppu	12	6
Q4	(Malaysia) L Cheah	12	10
2	(India) S Nehwal	21	21

Second Round
(Canada) M Li	21	11	21
(Japan) Y Hashimoto	11	21	7
(Chinese Taipei) Pai Y-p	13	21	14
(South Korea) Bae Y-j	21	9	21
(Thailand) B Ongbumrungpan	19	21	13
5	(China) Wang SX	21	8	21
(China) Sun Y	19	21	14
2	(India) S Nehwal	21	19	21

Quarterfinals
(Canada) M Li	8	21	10
(South Korea) Bae Y-j	21	17	21
5	(China) Wang SX	21	21
2	(India) S Nehwal	15	13

Semifinals
(South Korea) Bae Y-j	19	16
5	(China) Wang SX	21	21

=== Finals ===
Semifinals
7	(South Korea) Sung Ji-hyun	13	14
3	(Spain) Carolina Marín	21	21
(South Korea) Bae Yeon-ju	19	16
5	(China) Wang Shixian	21	21

Final
3	(Spain) Carolina Marín	22	21
5	(China) Wang Shixian	20	18

== Men's doubles ==
=== Seeds ===
1. (South Korea) Lee Yong-dae / Yoo Yeon-seong
2. (Indonesia) Mohammad Ahsan / Hendra Setiawan
3. (Chinese Taipei) Lee Sheng-mu / Tsai Chia-hsin
4. (China) Chai Biao / Hong Wei
5. (Japan) Hiroyuki Endo / Kenichi Hayakawa
6. (China) Liu Xiaolong / Qiu Zihan
7. (China) Fu Haifeng / Zhang Nan
8. (South Korea) Kim Ki-jung / Kim Sa-rang

=== Top half ===
First Round
1	(South Korea) Lee Y-d (South Korea) Yoo Y-s	21	21
(Germany) M Fuchs (Germany) P Kaesbauer	7	6
(Indonesia) W Nayaka (Indonesia) A Yusuf	22	21
(Denmark) M Conrad-Petersen (Denmark) M Pieler Kolding	20	19
5	(Japan) H Endo (Japan) K Hayakawa	21	21
(Russia) V Ivanov (Russia) I Sozonov	19	18
(Denmark) K Astrup (Denmark) A S Rasmussen	9	21	28
(Malaysia) Goh V S (Malaysia) Tan W K	21	18	30
4	(China) Chai B (China) Hong W	21	21
Q1	(Thailand) B Issara (Thailand) N Puangpuapech	14	19
Q2	(Australia) M Chau (Australia) S Serasinghe	10	14
(Japan) K Kazuno (Japan) K Yamada	21	21
7	(China) Fu HF (China) Zhang N	21	23
(England) M Ellis (England) C Langridge	10	21
(United States) P Chew (United States) S Pongnairat	13	15
(Indonesia) M Kido (Indonesia) A P R Putra	21	21

Second Round
1	(South Korea) Lee Y-d (South Korea) Yoo Y-s	21	21
(Indonesia) W Nayaka (Indonesia) A Yusuf	9	14
5	(Japan) H Endo (Japan) K Hayakawa	19	21	21
(Malaysia) Goh V S (Malaysia) Tan W K	21	16	16
4	(China) Chai B (China) Hong W	21	21
(Japan) K Kazuno (Japan) K Yamada	16	14
7	(China) Fu HF (China) Zhang N	21	21
(Indonesia) M Kido (Indonesia) A P R Putra	13	13

Quarterfinals
1	(South Korea) Lee Y-d (South Korea) Yoo Y-s	21	21
5	(Japan) H Endo (Japan) K Hayakawa	10	16
4	(China) Chai B (China) Hong W	22	21	21
7	(China) Fu HF (China) Zhang N	24	14	16

Semifinals
1	(South Korea) Lee Y-d (South Korea) Yoo Y-s	22	21
4	(China) Chai B (China) Hong W	20	18

=== Bottom half ===
First Round
(France) B Careme (France) R Labar	13	12
(Chinese Taipei) Chen H-l (Chinese Taipei) Wang C-l	21	21
(England) A Ellis (England) P Mills	15	12
6	(China) Liu XL (China) Qiu ZH	21	21
Q4	(Malaysia) Koo K K (Malaysia) Tan B H	21	20	21
(Japan) T Kamura (Japan) K Sonoda	16	22	10
Q3	(Malaysia) Mak H C (Malaysia) Teo K S	20	21	8
3	(Chinese Taipei) Lee S-m (Chinese Taipei) Tsai C-h	22	19	21
(China) Liu C (China) Lu K	21	21
(Japan) T Inoue (Japan) Y Kaneko	15	19
(Japan) H Hashimoto (Japan) N Hirata	21	21
8	(South Korea) Kim K-j (South Korea) Kim S-r	17	10
(China) Cai Y (China) Kang J	21	21
(India) P J Chopra (India) A Dewalker	15	15
(South Korea) Ko S-h (South Korea) Shin B-c	21	21
2	(Indonesia) M Ahsan (Indonesia) H Setiawan	19	15

Second Round
(Chinese Taipei) Chen H-l (Chinese Taipei) Wang C-l	16	17
6	(China) Liu XL (China) Qiu ZH	21	21
Q4	(Malaysia) Koo K K (Malaysia) Tan B H	21	21
3	(Chinese Taipei) Lee S-m (Chinese Taipei) Tsai C-h	16	18
(China) Liu C (China) Lu K	21	21
(Japan) H Hashimoto (Japan) N Hirata	18	19
(China) Cai Y (China) Kang J	7	13
(South Korea) Ko S-h (South Korea) Shin B-c	21	21

Quarterfinals
6	(China) Liu XL (China) Qiu ZH	21	21
Q4	(Malaysia) Koo K K (Malaysia) Tan B H	11	19
(China) Liu C (China) Lu K	21	21
(South Korea) Ko S-h (South Korea) Shin B-c	16	13

Semifinals
6	(China) Liu XL (China) Qiu ZH	21	11	13
(China) Liu C (China) Lu K	17	21	21

=== Finals ===
Semifinals
1	(South Korea) Lee Yong-dae (South Korea) Yoo Yeon-seong	22	21
4	(China) Chai Biao (China) Hong Wei	20	18
6	(China) Liu Xiaolong (China) Qiu Zihan	21	11	13
(China) Liu Cheng (China) Lu Kai	17	21	21

Final
1	(South Korea) Lee Yong-dae (South Korea) Yoo Yeon-seong	21	21
(China) Liu Cheng (China) Lu Kai	16	17

== Women's doubles ==
=== Seeds ===
1. (Japan) Misaki Matsutomo / Ayaka Takahashi
2. (Denmark) Christinna Pedersen / Kamilla Rytter Juhl
3. (Japan) Reika Kakiiwa / Miyuki Maeda
4. (Indonesia) Nitya Krishinda Maheswari / Greysia Polii
5. (China) Ma Jin / Tang Yuanting
6. (China) Tang Jinhua / Tian Qing
7. (South Korea) Lee So-hee / Shin Seung-chan
8. (Netherlands) Eefje Muskens / Selena Piek

=== Top half ===
First Round
1	(Japan) M Matsutomo (Japan) A Takahashi	21	21
(Indonesia) P Z Bernadeth (Indonesia) R A Pradipta	8	10
(Germany) I Herttrich (Germany) B Michels	21	21
(Indonesia) S Kurniawan (Australia) T Saunders	15	13
8	(Netherlands) E Muskens (Netherlands) S Piek	10	18
(South Korea) Go A-r (South Korea) Yoo H-w	21	21
(Russia) E Bolotova (Russia) E Kosetskaya	21	21
(Chinese Taipei) Hsu Y-c (Chinese Taipei) Pai Y-p	18	16
4	(Indonesia) N K Maheswari (Indonesia) G Polii	21	21
(Japan) N Fukuman (Japan) K Yonao	10	14
(India) J Gutta (India) A Ponnappa	21	21
(Netherlands) S Barning (Netherlands) I Tabeling	13	13
6	(China) Tang JH (China) Tian Q	21	21
(Thailand) J Kittiharakul (Thailand) R Prajongjai	11	11
Q1	(Hong Kong) Poon L Y (Hong Kong) Tse Y S	17	21	21
(England) H Olver (England) L Smith	21	19	17

Second Round
1	(Japan) M Matsutomo (Japan) A Takahashi	21	21
(Germany) I Herttrich (Germany) B Michels	18	8
(South Korea) Go A-r (South Korea) Yoo H-w	21	25
(Russia) E Bolotova (Russia) E Kosetskaya	7	23
4	(Indonesia) N K Maheswari (Indonesia) G Polii	21	21
(India) J Gutta (India) A Ponnappa	14	10
6	(China) Tang JH (China) Tian Q	21	21
Q1	(Hong Kong) Poon L Y (Hong Kong) Tse Y S	17	4

Quarterfinals
1	(Japan) M Matsutomo (Japan) A Takahashi	22	21	21
(South Korea) Go A-r (South Korea) Yoo H-w	24	12	18
4	(Indonesia) N K Maheswari (Indonesia) G Polii	18	16
6	(China) Tang JH (China) Tian Q	21	21

Semifinals
1	(Japan) M Matsutomo (Japan) A Takahashi	15	21	8
6	(China) Tang JH (China) Tian Q	21	19	21

=== Bottom half ===
First Round
(South Korea) Chang Y-n (South Korea) Jung K-e	21	21
Q4	(Chinese Taipei) Chiang K-h (Chinese Taipei) Wu F-c	11	9
Q2	(South Korea) Chae Y-j (South Korea) Kim S-y	21	18	13
5	(China) Ma J (China) Tang YT	13	21	21
(Malaysia) A A Anscelly (Malaysia) Soong F C	13	17
(Thailand) D Aroonkesorn (Thailand) K Voravichitchaikul	21	21
(Malaysia) V Hoo K M (Malaysia) Woon K W	13	17
3	(Japan) R Kakiiwa (Japan) M Maeda	21	21
(Thailand) P Supajirakul (Thailand) S Taerattanachai	21	21
(United States) E Lee (United States) P L Obanana	17	10
(Japan) S Matsuo (Japan) M Naito	21	21
7	(South Korea) Lee S-h (South Korea) Shin S-c	16	17
(Indonesia) A S Awanda (Indonesia) N K M Istirani	14	21	16
Q3	(Indonesia) S R Andini (Indonesia) M D Giovani	21	17	21
(Germany) J Goliszewski (Germany) C Nelte	13	8
2	(Denmark) C Pedersen (Denmark) K Rytter Juhl	21	21

Second Round
(South Korea) Chang Y-n (South Korea) Jung K-e	13	15
5	(China) Ma J (China) Tang YT	21	21
(Thailand) D Aroonkesorn (Thailand) K Voravichitchaikul	12	8
3	(Japan) R Kakiiwa (Japan) M Maeda	21	21
(Thailand) P Supajirakul (Thailand) S Taerattanachai	12	3
(Japan) S Matsuo (Japan) M Naito	21	21
Q3	(Indonesia) S R Andini (Indonesia) M D Giovani	10	15
2	(Denmark) C Pedersen (Denmark) K Rytter Juhl	21	21

Quarterfinals
5	(China) Ma J (China) Tang YT	21	21
3	(Japan) R Kakiiwa (Japan) M Maeda	13	10
(Japan) S Matsuo (Japan) M Naito	14	17
2	(Denmark) C Pedersen (Denmark) K Rytter Juhl	21	21

Semifinals
5	(China) Ma J (China) Tang YT	21	21
2	(Denmark) C Pedersen (Denmark) K Rytter Juhl	16	18

=== Finals ===
Semifinals
1	(Japan) Misaki Matsutomo (Japan) Ayaka Takahashi	15	21	8
6	(China) Tang Jinhua (China) Tian Qing	21	19	21
5	(China) Ma Jin (China) Tang Yuanting	21	21
2	(Denmark) Christinna Pedersen (Denmark) Kamilla Rytter Juhl	16	18

Final
6	(China) Tang Jinhua (China) Tian Qing	19	21	20
5	(China) Ma Jin (China) Tang Yuanting	21	16	22

== Mixed doubles ==
=== Seeds ===
1. (China) Xu Chen / Ma Jin
2. (Indonesia) Tantowi Ahmad / Lilyana Natsir
3. (Denmark) Joachim Fischer Nielsen / Christinna Pedersen
4. (China) Liu Cheng / Bao Yixin
5. (China) Lu Kai / Huang Yaqiong
6. (England) Chris Adcock / Gabrielle Adcock
7. (South Korea) Ko Sung-hyun / Kim Ha-na
8. (Indonesia) Praveen Jordan / Debby Susanto

=== Top half ===
First Round
1	(China) Xu C (China) Ma J	15	21	21
(Netherlands) J Arends (Netherlands) S Piek	21	19	18
(South Korea) Shin B-c (South Korea) Chae Y-j	21	22
Q3	(Malaysia) Chan P S (Malaysia) Goh L Y	14	20
7	(South Korea) Ko S-h (South Korea) Kim H-n	21	21
(Japan) K Hayakawa (Japan) M Matsutomo	14	9
(Indonesia) E Subaktiar (Indonesia) G E Widjaja	19	21	21
(South Korea) Yoo Y-s (South Korea) Chang Y-n	21	19	13
4	(China) Liu C (China) Bao YX	21	21
(France) G Mittelheisser (France) A Fontaine	19	4
(Hong Kong) Chan Y L (Hong Kong) Tse Y S	17	21	21
(Indonesia) M Kido (Indonesia) P Z Bernadeth	21	11	11
5	(China) Lu K (China) Huang YQ	21	21
(Netherlands) J De Ruitter (Netherlands) S Barning	17	11
Q2	(India) P J Chopra (India) A Ponnappa	19	14
(South Korea) Choi S-k (South Korea) Eom H-w	21	21

Second Round
1	(China) Xu C (China) Ma J	21	19	21
(South Korea) Shin B-c (South Korea) Chae Y-j	11	21	19
7	(South Korea) Ko S-h (South Korea) Kim H-n	21	21
(Indonesia) E Subaktiar (Indonesia) G E Widjaja	15	16
4	(China) Liu C (China) Bao YX	21	15	21
(Hong Kong) Chan Y L (Hong Kong) Tse Y S	16	21	15
5	(China) Lu K (China) Huang YQ	17	23	19
(South Korea) Choi S-k (South Korea) Eom H-w	21	21	21

Quarterfinals
1	(China) Xu C (China) Ma J	25	21	16
7	(South Korea) Ko S-h (South Korea) Kim H-n	27	19	21
4	(China) Liu C (China) Bao YX	21	21
(South Korea) Choi S-k (South Korea) Eom H-w	15	13

Semifinals
7	(South Korea) Ko S-h (South Korea) Kim H-n	17	16
4	(China) Liu C (China) Bao YX	21	21

=== Bottom half ===
First Round
(Russia) V Durkin (Russia) N Vislova	9	15
(Hong Kong) Lee C H (Hong Kong) Chau H W	21	21
(Germany) P Kaesbauer (Germany) C Nelte	21	18	16
8	(Indonesia) P Jordan (Indonesia) D Susanto	18	21	21
Q4	(South Korea) Lee Y-d (South Korea) Lee S-h	21	18	21
(Germany) M Fuchs (Germany) B Michels	16	21	19
(Indonesia) R Widianto (Indonesia) R P Dili	21	21	10
3	(Denmark) J Fischer Nielsen (Denmark) C Pedersen	16	23	21
(Thailand) N Puangpuapech (Thailand) P Supajirakul	21	21
(Republic of Ireland) S Magee (Republic of Ireland) C Magee	17	9
WC	(Australia) S Serasinghe (Australia) S Mapasa	10	18
6	(England) C Adcock (England) G Adcock	21	21
(United States) P Chew (United States) J Subandhi	9	20
Q1	(Japan) K Sonoda (Japan) N Fukuman	21	22
(France) R Labar (France) E Lefel	19	19
2	(Indonesia) T Ahmad (Indonesia) L Natsir	21	21

Second Round
(Hong Kong) Lee C H (Hong Kong) Chau H W	21	10	21
8	(Indonesia) P Jordan (Indonesia) D Susanto	19	21	8
Q4	(South Korea) Lee Y-d (South Korea) Lee S-h	13	14
3	(Denmark) J Fischer Nielsen (Denmark) C Pedersen	21	21
(Thailand) N Puangpuapech (Thailand) P Supajirakul	14	17
6	(England) C Adcock (England) G Adcock	21	21
Q1	(Japan) K Sonoda (Japan) N Fukuman	21	17	11
2	(Indonesia) T Ahmad (Indonesia) L Natsir	18	21	21

Quarterfinals
(Hong Kong) Lee C H (Hong Kong) Chau H W	21	13	21
3	(Denmark) J Fischer Nielsen (Denmark) C Pedersen	16	21	19
6	(England) C Adcock (England) G Adcock	9	12
2	(Indonesia) T Ahmad (Indonesia) L Natsir	21	21

Semifinals
(Hong Kong) Lee C H (Hong Kong) Chau H W	21	9	21
2	(Indonesia) T Ahmad (Indonesia) L Natsir	8	21	15

=== Finals ===
Semifinals
7	(South Korea) Ko Sung-hyun (South Korea) Kim Ha-na	17	16
4	(China) Liu Cheng (China) Bao Yixin	21	21
(Hong Kong) Lee Chun Hei (Hong Kong) Chau Hoi Wah	21	9	21
2	(Indonesia) Tontowi Ahmad (Indonesia) Lilyana Natsir	8	21	15

Final
4	(China) Liu Cheng (China) Bao Yixin	19	21	15
(Hong Kong) Lee Chun Hei (Hong Kong) Chau Hoi Wah	21	19	21

Preceded by 2014 Australian Super Series	Australian Open	Succeeded by 2016 Australian Super Series
Preceded by 2015 Singapore Super Series	BWF Super Series; 2015 BWF Season	Succeeded by 2015 Indonesia Super Series Premier
