= 2014 Hong Kong Super Series =

Tournament details
- Dates: 18–23 November 2014
- Level: Super Series
- Total prize money: US$350,000
- Venue: Hong Kong Coliseum
- Location: Hong Kong

Champions
- Men's singles: (South Korea) Son Wan-ho
- Women's singles: (Chinese Taipei) Tai Tzu-ying
- Men's doubles: (Indonesia) Mohammad Ahsan (Indonesia) Hendra Setiawan
- Women's doubles: (China) Tian Qing (China) Zhao Yunlei
- Mixed doubles: (China) Zhang Nan (China) Zhao Yunlei

The 2014 Hong Kong Super Series will be the twelfth super series tournament of the 2014 BWF Super Series. The tournament will be contested in Hong Kong from November 18–23, 2014 with a total purse of $350,000. A qualification will occur to fill four places in all five disciplines of the main draws.

== Men's singles ==
=== Seeds ===
1. (China) Chen Long
2. (Denmark) Jan Ø. Jørgensen
3. (Indonesia) Tommy Sugiarto
4. (Japan) Kenichi Tago
5. (China) Wang Zhengming
6. (South Korea) Son Wan-ho
7. (Chinese Taipei) Chou Tien-chen
8. (China) Tian Houwei

=== Top half ===
First Round
1 | (China) Chen L | 21 | 21
Q1 | (India) Ajay Jayaram | 13 | 7
Q3 | (Hong Kong) Ng Ka Long Angus | 13 | 21 | 11
(England) R Ouseph | 21 | 14 | 21
8 | (China) Tian HW | 15 | 8
(Malaysia) Chong W F | 21 | 21
(Indonesia) S D Kuncoro | 21 | 15 | 14
(Japan) T Ueda | 17 | 21 | 21
3 | (Indonesia) T Sugiarto | 21 | 15 | 19
(Hong Kong) Wei N | 15 | 21 | 21
(Denmark) H-K Vittinghus | 21 | 21
Q4 | (Japan) Riichi Takeshita | 17 | 9
7 | (Chinese Taipei) Chou T-c | 21 | 20 | 16
(India) Srikanth K. | 18 | 22 | 21
(Thailand) T Saensomboonsuk | 16 | 21 | 21
(India) K Parupalli | 21 | 17 | 14

Second Round
1 | (China) Chen L | 19 | 21 | 21
(England) R Ouseph | 21 | 10 | 14
(Malaysia) Chong W F | 18 | 21 | 20
(Japan) T Ueda | 21 | 15 | 22
(Hong Kong) Wei N | 8 | 21 | 21
(Denmark) H-K Vittinghus | 21 | 17 | 16
(India) Srikanth K. | 21 | 23
(Thailand) T Saensomboonsuk | 19 | 21

Quarterfinals
1 | (China) Chen L | 21 | 21
(Japan) T Ueda | 16 | 11
(Hong Kong) Wei N | 14 | 15
(India) Srikanth K. | 21 | 21

Semifinals
1 | (China) Chen L | 21 | 19 | 21
(India) Srikanth K. | 17 | 21 | 6

=== Bottom half ===
First Round
(Japan) S Sasaki | 21 | 15 | 22
PFQ | (India) R.M.V. Gurusaidutt | 15 | 21 | 20
(Hong Kong) Hu Y | 12 | 8
6 | (South Korea) Son W-h | 21 | 21
(France) B Leverdez | 14 | 21 | 21
(Indonesia) S Santoso | 21 | 19 | 19
(Denmark) V Axelsen | 21 | 23
4 | (Japan) K Tago | 15 | 21
(Thailand) B Ponsana | 21 | 21
Q2 | (China) Gao H | 11 | 16
(Japan) K Momota | 19 | 16
5 | (China) Wang ZM | 21 | 21
(Chinese Taipei) Hsu J-h | 17 | 21 | 15
(South Korea) Lee D-k | 21 | 11 | 21
(Germany) M Zwiebler | 17 | 21 | 11
2 | (Denmark) J Ø Jørgensen | 21 | 11 | 21

Second Round
(Japan) S Sasaki | 21 | 13 | 9
6 | (South Korea) Son W-h | 17 | 21 | 21
(France) B Leverdez | 7 | 14
(Denmark) V Axelsen | 21 | 21
(Thailand) B Ponsana | 10 | 5
5 | (China) Wang ZM | 21 | 21
(South Korea) Lee D-k | 23 | 15 | 17
2 | (Denmark) J Ø Jørgensen | 21 | 21 | 21

Quarterfinals
6 | (South Korea) Son W-h | 21 | 21
(Denmark) V Axelsen | 19 | 15
5 | (China) Wang ZM | 16 | 21 | 13
2 | (Denmark) J Ø Jørgensen | 21 | 10 | 21

Semifinals
6 | (South Korea) Son W-h | 21 | 21
2 | (Denmark) J Ø Jørgensen | 15 | 15

=== Finals ===
Semifinals
1 | (China) Chen Long | 21 | 19 | 21
(India) Srikanth Kidambi | 17 | 21 | 6
6 | (South Korea) Son Wan-ho | 21 | 21
2 | (Denmark) Jan Ø. Jørgensen | 15 | 15

Final
1 | (China) Chen Long | 19 | 16
6 | (South Korea) Son Wan-ho | 21 | 21

== Women's singles ==
=== Seeds ===
1. (China) Wang Shixian
2. (China) Wang Yihan
3. (India) Saina Nehwal
4. (Thailand) Ratchanok Intanon
5. (Spain) Carolina Marín
6. (Chinese Taipei) Tai Tzu-ying
7. (India) Pusarla Venkata Sindhu
8. (Japan) Minatsu Mitani

=== Top half ===
First Round
1 | (China) Wang SX | 21 | 21
(Japan) E Hirose | 9 | 13
(China) Liu X | 22 | 21
(Canada) M Li | 20 | 17
8 | (Japan) M Mitani | 21 | 21
(Chinese Taipei) Pai H-m | 10 | 13
(Hong Kong) Yip P Y | 14 | 21 | 16
(Thailand) P Buranaprasertsuk | 21 | 17 | 21
3 | (India) S Nehwal | 21 | 21
(United States) J Subandhi | 17 | 11
(United States) Z Beiwen | 16 | 21 | 21
(Russia) K Polikarpova | 21 | 13 | 19
6 | (Chinese Taipei) Tai T-y | 21 | 21
(Japan) S Takahashi | 16 | 16
(Republic of Ireland) C Magee | 17 | ^{r}
Q2 | (Hong Kong) Cheung N Y | 21

Second Round
1 | (China) Wang SX | 16 | 21 | 15
(China) Liu X | 21 | 9 | 21
8 | (Japan) M Mitani | 21 | 21
(Thailand) P Buranaprasertsuk | 18 | 14
3 | (India) S Nehwal | 21 | 21
(United States) B Zhang | 16 | 13
6 | (Chinese Taipei) Tai T-y | 21 | 20 | 21
Q2 | (Hong Kong) Cheung N Y | 17 | 22 | 14

Quarterfinals
(China) Liu X | 21 | 21
8 | (Japan) M Mitani | 19 | 15
3 | (India) S Nehwal | 15 | 19
6 | (Chinese Taipei) Tai T-y | 21 | 21

Semifinals
(China) Liu X | 21 | 16 | 16
6 | (Chinese Taipei) Tai T-y | 17 | 21 | 21

=== Bottom half ===
First Round
(Japan) N Okuhara | 21 | 20 | 21
(China) Sun Y | 18 | 22 | 16
(Thailand) B Ongbumrungpan | 15 | 21 | 19
7 | (India) P.V. Sindhu | 21 | 16 | 21
(Chinese Taipei) Pai Y-p | 12 | 19
Q4 | (Japan) A Yamaguchi | 21 | 21
(Japan) Y Hashimoto | 21 | 14 | 15
4 | (Thailand) R Intanon | 19 | 21 | 21
Q3 | (Malaysia) L Cheah | 28 | 12 | 21
(Singapore) Chen JY | 26 | 21 | 13
(Chinese Taipei) Hsu Y-c | 11 | 21 | 16
5 | (Spain) C Marín | 21 | 18 | 21
(Malaysia) Tee J Y | 22 | 21
Q1 | (Indonesia) R A Riodingin | 20 | 15
PFQ | (United States) I Wang | 14 | 11
2 | (China) Wang YH | 21 | 21

Second Round
(Japan) N Okuhara | 21 | 13 | 21
7 | (India) P.V. Sindhu | 17 | 21 | 11
Q4 | (Japan) A Yamaguchi | 19 | 21 | 21
4 | (Thailand) R Intanon | 21 | 19 | 19
Q3 | (Malaysia) L Cheah | 10 | 10
5 | (Spain) C Marín | 21 | 21
(Malaysia) Tee J Y | 21 | 14 | 21
2 | (China) Wang YH | 19 | 21 | 15

Quarterfinals
(Japan) N Okuhara | 21 | 21
Q4 | (Japan) A Yamaguchi | 15 | 11
5 | (Spain) C Marín | 21 | 21
(Malaysia) Tee J Y | 8 | 17

Semifinals
(Japan) N Okuhara | 21 | 21
5 | (Spain) C Marín | 13 | 9

=== Finals ===
Semifinals
(China) Liu Xin | 21 | 16 | 16
6 | (Chinese Taipei) Tai Tzu-ying | 17 | 21 | 21
(Japan) Nozomi Okuhara | 21 | 21
5 | (Spain) Carolina Marín | 13 | 9

Final
6 | (Chinese Taipei) Tai Tzu-ying | 21 | 21
(Japan) Nozomi Okuhara | 19 | 11

== Men's doubles ==
=== Seeds ===
1. (South Korea) Lee Yong-dae / Yoo Yeon-seong
2. (Indonesia) Mohammad Ahsan / Hendra Setiawan
3. (Japan) Hiroyuki Endo / Kenichi Hayakawa
4. (Chinese Taipei) Lee Sheng-mu / Tsai Chia-hsin
5. (South Korea) Ko Sung-hyun / Shin Baek-cheol
6. (China) Liu Xiaolong / Qiu Zihan
7. (China) Chai Biao / Hong Wei
8. (Indonesia) Marcus Fernaldi Gideon / Markis Kido

=== Top half ===
First Round
1 | (South Korea) Lee Y-d (South Korea) Yoo Y-s | 22 | 25
(Indonesia) A Pratama (Indonesia) R K Suwardi | 20 | 23
(Germany) M Fuchs (Germany) J Schöttler | 22 | 21
(China) Cai Y (China) Lu K | 20 | 16
5 | (South Korea) Ko S-h (South Korea) Shin B-c | 21 | 21
(Poland) Ł Moren (Poland) W Skudlarczyk | 9 | 6
(China) Kang J (China) Liu C | 19 | 21 | 14
(Japan) T Kamura (Japan) K Sonoda | 21 | 14 | 21
4 | (Chinese Taipei) Lee S-m (Chinese Taipei) Tsai C-h | 21 | 21
PFQ | (Chinese Taipei) Huang P-j (Chinese Taipei) Lu C-y | 18 | 14
(Thailand) M Jongjit (Thailand) N Puangpuapech | 21 | 17 | 21
(England) A Ellis (England) P Mills | 18 | 21 | 16
6 | (China) Liu XL (China) Qiu ZH | 21 | 21
(Poland) A Cwałina (Poland) P Wacha | 11 | 19
(Indonesia) B Angriawan (Indonesia) R A Saputro | 19 | 12
(Japan) H Hashimoto (Japan) N Hirata | 21 | 21

Second Round
1 | (South Korea) Lee Y-d (South Korea) Yoo Y-s | 18 | 21 | 14
(Germany) M Fuchs (Germany) J Schöttler | 21 | 12 | 21
5 | (South Korea) Ko S-h (South Korea) Shin B-c | 19 | 21 | 15
(Japan) T Kamura (Japan) K Sonoda | 21 | 13 | 21
4 | (Chinese Taipei) Lee S-m (Chinese Taipei) Tsai C-h | 19 | 20
(Thailand) M Jongjit (Thailand) N Puangpuapech | 21 | 22
6 | (China) Liu XL (China) Qiu ZH | 21 | 21
(Japan) H Hashimoto (Japan) N Hirata | 14 | 9

Quarterfinals
(Germany) M Fuchs (Germany) J Schöttler | 21 | 9
(Japan) T Kamura (Japan) K Sonoda | 23 | 21
(Thailand) M Jongjit (Thailand) N Puangpuapech | 24 | 15 | 11
6 | (China) Liu XL (China) Qiu ZH | 22 | 21 | 21

Semifinals
(Japan) T Kamura (Japan) K Sonoda | 21 | 13 | 14
6 | (China) Liu XL (China) Qiu ZH | 18 | 21 | 21

=== Bottom half ===
First Round
(Russia) V Ivanov (Russia) I Sozonov | 21 | 21
(Singapore) D B Chrisnanta (Singapore) C Triyachart | 14 | 11
Q3 | (Hong Kong) Lee C H (Hong Kong) Tang C M | 19 | 20
8 | (Indonesia) M F Gideon (Indonesia) M Kido | 21 | 22
Q1 | (Malaysia) Hoon T H (Malaysia) Tan B H | 17 | 21 | 20
(Denmark) A Skårup Rasmussen (Denmark) K Astrup Sorensen | 21 | 18 | 22
(Denmark) M Conrad-Petersen (Denmark) M Pieler Kolding | 21 | 21
3 | (Japan) H Endo (Japan) K Hayakawa | 17 | 17
(Japan) K Kazuno (Japan) K Yamada | 21 | 21
Q4 | (Chinese Taipei) Liao M-c (Chinese Taipei) Tseng M-h | 19 | 19
(Thailand) W Ampunsuwan (Thailand) P Chalardchaleam | 21 | 15 | 18
7 | (China) Chai B (China) Hong W | 15 | 21 | 21
(China) Fu HF (China) Zhang N | 21 | 21
Q2 | (Netherlands) R Bosch (Chinese Taipei) Tien T-c | 14 | 16
(India) M Attri (India) S Reddy B | 15 | 17
2 | (Indonesia) M Ahsan (Indonesia) H Setiwan | 21 | 21

Second Round
(Russia) V Ivanov (Russia) I Sozonov | 21 | 21
8 | (Indonesia) M F Gideon (Indonesia) M Kido | 15 | 12
(Denmark) A Skårup Rasmussen (Denmark) K Astrup Sorensen | 13 | 15
(Denmark) M Conrad-Petersen (Denmark) M Pieler Kolding | 21 | 21
(Japan) K Kazuno (Japan) K Yamada | 21 | 23
7 | (China) Chai B (China) Hong W | 18 | 21
(China) Fu HF (China) Zhang N | 19 | 21 | 17
2 | (Indonesia) M Ahsan (Indonesia) H Setiwan | 21 | 6 | 21

Quarterfinals
(Russia) V Ivanov (Russia) I Sozonov | 21 | 16 | 13
(Denmark) M Conrad-Petersen (Denmark) M Pieler Kolding | 17 | 21 | 21
(Japan) K Kazuno (Japan) K Yamada | 12 | 15
2 | (Indonesia) M Ahsan (Indonesia) H Setiwan | 21 | 21

Semifinals
(Denmark) M Conrad-Petersen (Denmark) M Pieler Kolding | 16 | 21 | 19
2 | (Indonesia) M Ahsan (Indonesia) H Setiwan | 21 | 15 | 21

=== Finals ===
Semifinals
(Japan) Takeshi Kamura (Japan) Keigo Sonoda | 21 | 13 | 14
6 | (China) Liu Xiaolong (China) Qiu Zihan | 18 | 21 | 21
(Denmark) Mads Conrad-Petersen (Denmark) Mads Pieler Kolding | 16 | 21 | 19
2 | (Indonesia) Mohammad Ahsan (Indonesia) Hendra Setiawan | 21 | 15 | 21

Final
6 | (China) Liu Xiaolong (China) Qiu Zihan | 16 | 21 | 15
2 | (Indonesia) Mohammad Ahsan (Indonesia) Hendra Setiawan | 21 | 17 | 21

== Women's doubles ==
=== Seeds ===
1. (Japan) Misaki Matsutomo / Ayaka Takahashi
2. (China) Tian Qing / Zhao Yunlei
3. (Japan) Reika Kakiiwa / Miyuki Maeda
4. (China) Luo Ying / Luo Yu
5. (China) Bao Yixin / Wang Xiaoli
6. (China) Tang Jinhua / Tang Yuanting
7. (Indonesia) Nitya Krishinda Maheswari / Greysia Polii
8. (Netherlands) Eefje Muskens / Selena Piek

=== Top half ===
First Round
1 | (Japan) M Matsutomo (Japan) A Takahashi | 18 | 21 | 21
(South Korea) Eom H-w (South Korea) Go A-r | 21 | 13 | 14
(South Korea) Kim H-n (South Korea) Yoo H-w | 21 | 21
(Malaysia) A A Anscelly (Malaysia) Soong F C | 16 | 14
8 | (Netherlands) E Muskens (Netherlands) S Piek | 21 | 11 | 23
(Indonesia) S P Irawati (Indonesia) V Marissa | 17 | 21 | 21
(Russia) A Chervyakova (Russia) N Vislova | 9 | 11
(Thailand) P Supajirakul (Thailand) S Taerattanachai | 21 | 21
3 | (Japan) R Kakiiwa (Japan) M Maeda | 18 | 21 | 21
(Hong Kong) Chan T K (Hong Kong) Tse Y S | 21 | 15 | 14
(Thailand) D Aroonkesorn (Thailand) K Voravichitchaikul | 18 | 14
(Japan) Y Fukushima (Japan) S Hirota | 21 | 21
7 | (Indonesia) N K Maheswari (Indonesia) G Polii | 21
(Japan) S Matsuo (Japan) M Naito | 15 | ^{r}
(Canada) N Grether (Canada) C Reid | 16 | 14
(Singapore) V Neo Y Y (Singapore) S M Sari | 21 | 21

Second Round
1 | (Japan) M Matsutomo (Japan) A Takahashi | w | / | o
(South Korea) Kim H-n (South Korea) Yoo H-w
8 | (Netherlands) E Muskens (Netherlands) S Piek | 22 | 21
(Thailand) P Supajirakul (Thailand) S Taerattanachai | 20 | 13
3 | (Japan) R Kakiiwa (Japan) M Maeda | 21 | 21
(Japan) Y Fukushima (Japan) S Hirota | 15 | 16
7 | (Indonesia) N K Maheswari (Indonesia) G Polii | 21 | 21
(Singapore) V Neo Y Y (Singapore) S M Sari | 15 | 13

Quarterfinals
1 | (Japan) M Matsutomo (Japan) A Takahashi | 20 | 21 | 21
8 | (Netherlands) E Muskens (Netherlands) S Piek | 22 | 18 | 4
3 | (Japan) R Kakiiwa (Japan) M Maeda | 15 | 21
7 | (Indonesia) N K Maheswari (Indonesia) G Polii | 21 | 23

Semifinals
1 | (Japan) M Matsutomo (Japan) A Takahashi | 21 | 21
7 | (Indonesia) N K Maheswari (Indonesia) G Polii | 16 | 15

=== Bottom half ===
First Round
(Malaysia) Lim Y L (Malaysia) Lee M Y | 16 | 21 | 23
(India) J Gutta (India) A Ponnappa | 21 | 14 | 21
(Malaysia) Hoo V K M (Malaysia) Woon K W | 10 | 19
5 | (China) Bao YX (China) Wang XL | 21 | 21
Q2 | (Chinese Taipei) Tsun Y-l (Chinese Taipei) Yu W-k | 15 | 15
(Thailand) J Kittiharakul (Thailand) R Prajongjai | 21 | 21
(United States) E Lee (United States) P L Obanana | 16 | 19
4 | (China) Luo Y (China) Luo Y | 21 | 21
Q3 | (Hong Kong) Poon L Y (Hong Kong) Shek H Y | 17 | 18
(Indonesia) P Z Bernadeth (Indonesia) R A Pradipta | 21 | 21
(South Korea) Jang Y-N (South Korea) Lee S-h | 21 | 21
PFQ | (Chinese Taipei) Chen H-h (Chinese Taipei) Lai C-w | 11 | 18
Q1 | (South Korea) Jung K-e (South Korea) Shin S-c | 10 | 21 | 21
(Indonesia) S R Andini (Indonesia) T R Nuraidah | 21 | 13 | 7
Q4 | (Chinese Taipei) Cheng W-h (Chinese Taipei) Wang P-r | 11 | 17
2 | (China) Tian Q (China) Zhao YL | 21 | 21

Second Round
(Malaysia) Lim Y L (Malaysia) Lee M Y | 21 | 16 | 9
5 | (China) Bao YX (China) Wang XL | 19 | 21 | 21
(Thailand) J Kittiharakul (Thailand) R Prajongjai | 16 | 19
4 | (China) Luo Y (China) Luo Y | 21 | 21
(Indonesia) P Z Bernadeth (Indonesia) R A Pradipta | 16 | 23 | 17
(South Korea) Jang Y-N (South Korea) Lee S-h | 21 | 21 | 21
(South Korea) Jung K-e (South Korea) Shin S-c | 11 | 19
2 | (China) Tian Q (China) Zhao YL | 21 | 21

Quarterfinals
5 | (China) Bao YX (China) Wang XL | 19 | 19
4 | (China) Luo Y (China) Luo Y | 21 | 21
(South Korea) Jang Y-N (South Korea) Lee S-h | 12 | 21 | 15
2 | (China) Tian Q (China) Zhao YL | 21 | 14 | 21

Semifinals
4 | (China) Luo Y (China) Luo Y | 19 | 11
2 | (China) Tian Q (China) Zhao YL | 21 | 21

=== Finals ===
Semifinals
1 | (Japan) Misaki Matsutomo (Japan) Ayaka Takahashi | 21 | 21
7 | (Indonesia) Nitya Krishinda Maheswari (Indonesia) Greysia Polii | 16 | 15
4 | (China) Luo Ying (China) Luo Yu | 19 | 11
2 | (China) Tian Qing (China) Zhao Yunlei | 21 | 21

Final
1 | (Japan) Misaki Matsutomo (Japan) Ayaka Takahashi | 13 | 13
2 | (China) Tian Qing (China) Zhao Yunlei | 21 | 21

== Mixed doubles ==
=== Seeds ===
1. (China) Zhang Nan / Zhao Yunlei
2. (China) Xu Chen / Ma Jin
3. (England) Chris Adcock / Gabrielle Adcock
4. (South Korea) Ko Sung-hyun / Kim Ha-na
5. (China) Lu Kai / Huang Yaqiong
6. (China) Liu Cheng / Bao Yixin
7. (Germany) Michael Fuchs / Birgit Michels
8. (Thailand) Sudket Prapakamol / Saralee Thoungthongkam

=== Top half ===
First Round
1 | (China) Zhang N (China) Zhao YL | w | / | o
(Republic of Ireland) S Magee (Republic of Ireland) C Magee
Q3 | (South Korea) Yoo Y-s (South Korea) Eom H-w | 21 | 27
(Thailand) N Puangpuapech (Thailand) P Supajirakul | 17 | 25
6 | (China) Liu C (China) Bao YX | 21 | 21
(Japan) K Hayakawa (Japan) M Matsutomo | 17 | 9
(Singapore) D B Chrisnanta (Singapore) V Neo Y Y | 16 | 20
(Hong Kong) Lee C H (Hong Kong) Chau H W | 21 | 22
3 | (England) C Adcock (England) G Adcock | 21 | 21
(Malaysia) Chan P S (Malaysia) Ng H L | 13 | 18
(Indonesia) P Jordan (Indonesia) L Natsir | 21 | 21
(Netherlands) J Arends (Netherlands) S Piek | 8 | 17
7 | (Germany) M Fuchs (Germany) B Michels | 21 | 21
Q4 | (Chinese Taipei) Liao M-c (Chinese Taipei) Chen H-h | 14 | 9
(South Korea) Lee Y-d (South Korea) Lee S-h | 21 | 17 | 21
(Hong Kong) Chan Y L (Hong Kong) Tse Y S | 19 | 21 | 9

Second Round
1 | (China) Zhang N (China) Zhao YL | 21 | 21
Q3 | (South Korea) Yoo Y-s (South Korea) Eom H-w | 14 | 17
6 | (China) Liu C (China) Bao YX | 21 | 16 | 21
(Hong Kong) Lee C H (Hong Kong) Chau H W | 15 | 21 | 14
3 | (England) C Adcock (England) G Adcock | 21 | 21
(Indonesia) P Jordan (Indonesia) L Natsir | 18 | 11
7 | (Germany) M Fuchs (Germany) B Michels | 20 | 21
(South Korea) Lee Y-d (South Korea) Lee S-h | 22 | 23

Quarterfinals
1 | (China) Zhang N (China) Zhao YL | 21 | 21
6 | (China) Liu C (China) Bao YX | 16 | 9
3 | (England) C Adcock (England) G Adcock | 21 | 21
(South Korea) Lee Y-d (South Korea) Lee S-h | 14 | 17

Semifinals
1 | (China) Zhang N (China) Zhao YL | 21 | 21
3 | (England) C Adcock (England) G Adcock | 12 | 10

=== Bottom half ===
First Round
(Hong Kong) F Kurniawan (Hong Kong) Poon L Y | 21 | 21
(United States) H Shu (United States) E Lee | 10 | 11
(Thailand) M Jongjit (Thailand) S Taerattanachai | 17 | 11
5 | (China) Lu K (China) Huang YQ | 21 | 21
(Indonesia) R Widianto (Indonesia) P R Dili | 21 | 21
(Netherlands) J De Ruitter (Netherlands) S Barning | 13 | 18
Q1 | (Malaysia) Tan AQ (Malaysia) Lai PJ | 13 | 12
4 | (South Korea) Ko S-h (South Korea) Kim H-n | 21 | 21
(Indonesia) T Ahmad (Indonesia) D Susanto | 21 | 21
Q2 | (Russia) E Dremin (Russia) E Dimova | 11 | 16
(Indonesia) M Kido (Indonesia) P Z Bernadeth | 18 | 14
8 | (Thailand) S Prapakamol (Thailand) S Thoungthongkam | 21 | 21
(Japan) H Hashimoto (Japan) M Maeda | 11
(South Korea) Shin B-c (South Korea) Jang Y-n | 6^{r}
(Russia) V Durkin (Russia) N Vislova | 16 | 9
2 | (China) Xu C (China) Ma J | 21 | 21

Second Round
(Hong Kong) F Kurniawan (Hong Kong) Poon L Y | 11 | 15
5 | (China) Lu K (China) Huang YQ | 21 | 21
(Indonesia) R Widianto (Indonesia) P R Dili | w | / | o
4 | (South Korea) Ko S-h (South Korea) Kim H-n
(Indonesia) T Ahmad (Indonesia) D Susanto | 21 | 21
8 | (Thailand) S Prapakamol (Thailand) S Thoungthongkam | 16 | 14
(Japan) H Hashimoto (Japan) M Maeda | 10 | 16
2 | (China) Xu C (China) Ma J | 21 | 21

Quarterfinals
5 | (China) Lu K (China) Huang YQ | 21 | 21
(Indonesia) R Widianto (Indonesia) P R Dili | 18 | 14
(Indonesia) T Ahmad (Indonesia) D Susanto | 17 | 14
2 | (China) Xu C (China) Ma J | 21 | 21

Semifinals
5 | (China) Lu K (China) Huang YQ | 20 | 18
2 | (China) Xu C (China) Ma J | 22 | 21

=== Finals ===
Semifinals
1 | (China) Zhang Nan (China) Zhao Yunlei | 21 | 21
3 | (England) Chris Adcock (England) Gabrielle Adcock | 12 | 10
5 | (China) Lu Kai (China) Huang Yaqiong | 20 | 18
2 | (China) Xu Chen (China) Ma Jin | 22 | 21

Final
1 | (China) Zhang Nan (China) Zhao Yunlei | 21 | 21
2 | (China) Xu Chen (China) Ma Jin | 14 | 19
