= 2013 German Open Grand Prix Gold =

Tournament details
- Dates: February 26, 2013 - March 3, 2013
- Total prize money: US$120,000
- Venue: RWE-Sporthalle
- Location: Mulheim an der Ruhr, Germany

Champions
- Men's singles: (China) Chen Long
- Women's singles: (China) Wang Yihan
- Men's doubles: (China) Chai Biao (China) Hong Wei
- Women's doubles: (South Korea) Jung Kyung-eun (South Korea) Kim Ha-na
- Mixed doubles: (South Korea) Shin Baek-cheol (South Korea) Chang Ye-na

The 2013 German Open Grand Prix Gold was the first grand prix gold and grand prix tournament of the 2013 BWF Grand Prix Gold and Grand Prix. The tournament was held in RWE-Sporthalle, Mulheim an der Ruhr, Germany from February 26 until March 3, 2013 and had a total purse of $120,000.

== Men's singles ==
=== Seeds ===
1. (China) Chen Long (champion)
2. (Thailand) Boonsak Ponsana (semi-final)
3. (Japan) Sho Sasaki (third round)
4. (Hong Kong) Wong Wing Ki (quarter-final)
5. (Germany) Marc Zwiebler (quarter-final)
6. (Denmark) Viktor Axelsen (second round)
7. (Japan) Takuma Ueda (third round)
8. (Indonesia) Tommy Sugiarto (final)
9. (Chinese Taipei) Chou Tien-chen (third round)
10. (India) Ajay Jayaram (third round)
11. (China) Gao Huan (withdrew)
12. (England) Rajiv Ouseph (quarter-final)
13. (Malaysia) Tan Chun Seang (first round)
14. (Thailand) Tanongsak Saensomboonsuk (third round)
15. (India) Rajah Menuri Venkata Gurusaidutt (first round)
16. (Sri Lanka) Niluka Karunaratne (third round)

=== Finals ===
Quarterfinals
1	(China) Chen Long	21	19	21
5	(Germany) Marc Zwiebler	10	21	12
4	(Hong Kong) Wong Wing Ki	12	11
Q5	(China) Qiao Bin	21	21
8	(Indonesia) Tommy Sugiarto	21	21
12	(England) Rajiv Ouseph	15	10
(India) Anand Pawar	9	11
2	(Thailand) Boonsak Ponsana	21	21

Semifinals
1	(China) Chen Long	21	21
Q5	(China) Qiao Bin	8	16
8	(Indonesia) Tommy Sugiarto	21	21
2	(Thailand) Boonsak Ponsana	19	12

Final
1	(China) Chen Long	21	21
8	(Indonesia) Tommy Sugiarto	17	11

=== Top half ===
==== Section 1 ====
First Round
1	(China) Chen L	21	21	21
(Czech Republic) P Koukal	23	15	18
(Denmark) R Ulsing	19	21	14
Q8	(Sweden) G Ulldahl	21	10	21
13	(Malaysia) Tan CS	18	10
(Netherlands) E Pang	21	21
(England) A Smith	10	13
(Thailand) P Poodchalat	21	21

Second Round
1	(China) Chen L	21	21
(Sweden) G Ulldahl	6	15
(Netherlands) E Pang	18	21	21
(Thailand) P Poodchalat	21	19	14

Third Round
1	(China) Chen L	21	21
(Netherlands) E Pang	9	12

==== Section 2 ====
First Round
5	(Germany) M Zwiebler	24	21
(Denmark) C Thomsen	22	19
(Japan) K Sakai	21	21
(Finland) V Lang	7	9
14	(Thailand) T Saensomboonsuk	21	21
(Guatemala) K Cordon	17	12
(Denmark) E Holst	13	17
(Ukraine) D Zavadsky	21	21

Second Round
5	(Germany) M Zwiebler	21	10	21
(Japan) K Sakai	18	22	19
14	(Thailand) T Saensomboonsuk	21	10	22
(Ukraine) D Zavadsky	12	21	20

Third Round
5	(Germany) M Zwiebler	21	16	21
14	(Thailand) T Saensomboonsuk	15	21	13

==== Section 3 ====
First Round
4	(Hong Kong) Wong WK	21	21
(Singapore) D Wong	5	12
(Indonesia) A Tedjono	17	21	21
(Belgium) Y Tan	21	18	13
9	(Chinese Taipei) Chou T-c	21	21
Q6	(Netherlands) E Meijs	12	13
(Indonesia) W Prasetyo	21	0
(Germany) M Reuter	19	0^{r}

Second Round
4	(Hong Kong) Wong WK	21	19	21
(Indonesia) A Tedjono	11	21	13
9	(Chinese Taipei) Chou T-c	22	21
(Indonesia) W Prasetyo	20	13

Third Round
4	(Hong Kong) Wong WK	21	24
9	(Chinese Taipei) Chou T-c	8	22

==== Section 4 ====
First Round
7	(Japan) T Ueda	21	21
(France) M Lo Ying Ping	19	17
Q7	(Germany) K Schaefer	14	13
(Malaysia) R Misbun	21	21
15	(India) R Gurusaidutt	17	11
Q5	(China) Qiao B	21	21
(Japan) K Momota	21	21
Q1	(Thailand) P Vilailak	11	19

Second Round
7	(Japan) T Ueda	21	21
(Malaysia) R Misbun	17	16
Q5	(China) Qiao B	21	21
(Japan) K Momota	16	18

Third Round
7	(Japan) T Ueda	17	21	11
Q5	(China) Qiao B	21	15	21

=== Bottom half ===
==== Section 5 ====
First Round
Q4	(Japan) R Takeshita	21	21
(Germany) D Domke	18	11
(France) B Leverdez	12	18
10	(India) A Jayaram	21	21
(Hong Kong) Chan YK	18	15
(Malaysia) Goh SH	21	21
(Czech Republic) J Frohlich	12	15
8	(Indonesia) T Sugiarto	21	21

Second Round
Q4	(Japan) R Takeshita	17	16
10	(India) A Jayaram	21	21
(Malaysia) Goh SH	19	7
8	(Indonesia) T Sugiarto	21	21

Third Round
10	(India) A Jayaram	16	13
8	(Indonesia) T Sugiarto	21	21

==== Section 6 ====
First Round
(Denmark) R Fladberg	19	12
Q3	(Hong Kong) Ng KL	21	21
(China) Chen YK	15	19
12	(England) R Ouseph	21	21
(Republic of Ireland) S Evans	21	17	21
(Germany) L Schmidt	18	21	15
(England) T Penty	13	21	15
3	(Japan) S Sasaki	21	13	21

Second Round
Q3	(Hong Kong) Ng KL	16	5
12	(England) R Ouseph	21	21
(Republic of Ireland) S Evans	21	21	14
3	(Japan) S Sasaki	9	23	21

Third Round
12	(England) R Ouseph	21	22
3	(Japan) S Sasaki	13	20

==== Section 7 ====
First Round
(Slovenia) I Utrosa	22	22
(Malaysia) Loh WS	20	20
(Chinese Taipei) Hsueh H-y
11	(China) Gao H	wo
(Austria) M Lahnsteiner	20	21	16
(India) A Pawar	22	16	21
Q2	(Slovakia) J Vicen	7	5
6	(Denmark) V Axelsen	21	21

Second Round
(Slovenia) I Utrosa	13	10
(Chinese Taipei) Hsueh H-y	21	21
(India) A Pawar	21	22
6	(Denmark) V Axelsen	11	20

Third Round
(Chinese Taipei) Hsueh H-y	15	13
(India) A Pawar	21	21

==== Section 8 ====
First Round
(Finland) E Heino	21	21
PFQ	(Denmark) K Bruun	15	19
(Ukraine) V Atrashchenkov	20	15
16	(Sri Lanka) N Karunaratne	22	21
PFQ	(India) A Bhat	21	21
PFQ	(India) A Sridhar	17	15
(Lithuania) K Navickas	11	11
2	(Thailand) B Ponsana	21	21

Second Round
(Finland) E Heino	21	18
16	(Sri Lanka) N Karunaratne	23	21
PFQ	(India) A Bhat	10	16
2	(Thailand) B Ponsana	21	21

Third Round
16	(Sri Lanka) N Karunaratne	5^{r}
2	(Thailand) B Ponsana	17

== Women's singles ==
=== Seeds ===
1. (China) Li Xuerui (quarter-final)
2. (China) Wang Yihan (champion)
3. (Germany) Juliane Schenk (final)
4. (South Korea) Sung Ji-hyun (semi-final)
5. (Chinese Taipei) Tai Tzu-ying (quarter-final)
6. (Japan) Minatsu Mitani (withdrew)
7. (Thailand) Porntip Buranaprasertsuk (first round)
8. (Japan) Eriko Hirose (second round)

=== Finals ===
Semifinals
(Japan) Sayaka Takahashi	17	19
3	(Germany) Juliane Schenk	21	21
4	(South Korea) Sung Ji-hyun	19	21	16
2	(China) Wang Yihan	21	8	21

Final
3	(Germany) Juliane Schenk	14	13
2	(China) Wang Yihan	21	21

=== Top half ===
==== Section 1 ====
First Round
1	(China) Li XR	21	19	21
(Hong Kong) Yip PY	16	21	11
(Japan) K Imabeppu	21	17	18
(Indonesia) L Fanetri	19	21	21
PFQ	(Republic of Ireland) C Magee	24	20
Q1	(Russia) N Perminova	26	22
(Japan) S Takahashi	21	21
(New Zealand) M Chan Ky	15	9

Second Round
1	(China) Li XR	21	21
(Indonesia) L Fanetri	19	11
Q1	(Russia) N Perminova	8	17
(Japan) S Takahashi	21	21

Quarterfinals
1	(China) Li XR	21	12	17
(Japan) S Takahashi	17	21	21

==== Section 2 ====
First Round
3	(Germany) J Schenk	21	21
(South Korea) Bae Y-j	16	8
(Bulgaria) P Nedelcheva	23	19	15
(France) S Vignes Waran	21	21	21
5	(Chinese Taipei) Tai T-y	21	14	26
(Thailand) B Ongbumrungpan	12	21	24
Q3	(China) Deng X	17	18
(China) Han L	21	21

Second Round
3	(Germany) J Schenk	21	21
(France) S Vignes Waran	14	14
5	(Chinese Taipei) Tai T-y	21	17	21
(China) Han L	19	21	17

Quarterfinals
3	(Germany) J Schenk	21	21
5	(Chinese Taipei) Tai T-y	14	16

=== Bottom half ===
==== Section 3 ====
First Round
PFQ	(Germany) K Schnaase	14	22	15
(Indonesia) A Yuswandari	21	20	21
(Spain) C Marín	21	20	22
8	(Japan) E Hirose	19	22	24
(Scotland) K Gilmour	22	21
(Czech Republic) K Gavnholt	20	19
Q4	(Germany) C Bott	6	12
4	(South Korea) Sung J-h	21	21

Second Round
(Indonesia) A Yuswandari	10	21	21
8	(Japan) E Hirose	21	15	9
(Scotland) K Gilmour	15	11
4	(South Korea) Sung J-h	21	21

Quarterfinals
(Indonesia) A Yuswandari	18	14
4	(South Korea) Sung J-h	21	21

==== Section 4 ====
First Round
Q2	(Malaysia) S Cheah	21	20	18
(Singapore) Gu J	14	22	21
(Hong Kong) Chan TK	21	21
7	(Thailand) P Buranaprasertsuk	12	12
(Bulgaria) L Zechiri	21	12	9
(Canada) M Li	19	21	21
(Indonesia) B Manuputty	17	19
2	(China) Wang YH	21	21

Second Round
(Singapore) Gu J	18	10
(Hong Kong) Chan TK	21	21
(Canada) M Li	17	17
2	(China) Wang YH	21	21

Quarterfinals
(Hong Kong) Chan TK	18	17
2	(China) Wang YH	21	21

== Men's doubles ==
=== Seeds ===
1. (South Korea) Ko Sung-hyun / Lee Yong-dae (quarter-final)
2. (Japan) Hiroyuki Endo / Kenichi Hayakawa (quarter-final)
3. (South Korea) Kim Ki-jung / Kim Sa-rang (semi-final)
4. (Japan) Hirokatsu Hashimoto / Noriyasu Hirata (first round)
5. (Russia) Vladimir Ivanov / Ivan Sozonov (withdrew)
6. (China) Chai Biao / Hong Wei (champion)
7. (China) Liu Xiaolong / Qiu Zihan (final)
8. (Germany) Ingo Kindervater / Johannes Schoettler (quarter-final)

=== Finals ===
Semifinals
7	(China) Liu Xiaolong (China) Qiu Zihan	21	21
(Chinese Taipei) Lee Sheng-mu (Chinese Taipei) Tsai Chia-hsin	19	19
3	(South Korea) Kim Ki-jung (South Korea) Kim Sa-rang	21	19	13
6	(China) Chai Biao (China) Hong Wei	15	21	21

Final
7	(China) Liu Xiaolong (China) Qiu Zihan	10	14
6	(China) Chai Biao (China) Hong Wei	21	21

=== Top half ===
==== Section 1 ====
First Round
1	(South Korea) Ko S-h (South Korea) Lee Y-d	21	21
PFQ	(Netherlands) R Bosch (Netherlands) K Ridder	13	19
(Japan) T Kamura (Japan) K Sonoda	21	21
(South Korea) Kang J-w (South Korea) Lee S-j	19	12
7	(China) Liu XL (China) Qiu ZH	21	21
(Germany) M Fuchs (Germany) O Roth	16	17
(Malaysia) Gan TC (Malaysia) Ong SH	17	17
(England) M Ellis (Scotland) P Van Rietvelde	21	21

Second Round
1	(South Korea) Ko S-h (South Korea) Lee Y-d	22	21
(Japan) T Kamura (Japan) K Sonoda	20	12
7	(China) Liu XL (China) Qiu ZH	21	19	21
(England) M Ellis (Scotland) P Van Rietvelde	7	21	16

Quarterfinals
1	(South Korea) Ko S-h (South Korea) Lee Y-d	14	14
7	(China) Liu XL (China) Qiu ZH	21	21

==== Section 2 ====
First Round
4	(Japan) H Hashimoto (Japan) N Hirata	15	12
(Chinese Taipei) Lee S-m (Chinese Taipei) Tsai C-h	21	21
(England) C Langridge (England) P Mills	15	21	25
(Indonesia) Y Suryatama (Indonesia) H Gunawan	21	13	23
PFQ	(Malaysia) N Heg (Malaysia) Teo EY	17	22	17
(Malaysia) Chooi KM (Malaysia) Ow YH	21	20	21
(Denmark) R Bonde (Denmark) M Conrad-Petersen	20	21	21
(Canada) A Liu (Canada) D Ng	21	14	15

Second Round
(Chinese Taipei) Lee S-m (Chinese Taipei) Tsai C-h	21	21
(England) C Langridge (England) P Mills	19	15
(Malaysia) Chooi KM (Malaysia) Ow YH	15	14
(Denmark) R Bonde (Denmark) M Conrad-Petersen	21	21

Quarterfinals
(Chinese Taipei) Lee S-m (Chinese Taipei) Tsai C-h	17	21	21
(Denmark) R Bonde (Denmark) M Conrad-Petersen	21	8	15

=== Bottom half ===
==== Section 3 ====
First Round
(India) T Kona (India) A Vishnu	16	17
(Malaysia) Goh VS (Malaysia) Lim KW	21	21
(Netherlands) J Arends (Netherlands) J Maas	12	13
8	(Germany) I Kindervater (Germany) J Schoettler	21	21
(Indonesia) R Suwardi (Indonesia) M Ulinnuha	12	21	25
(England) C Adcock (England) A Ellis	21	16	27
(Denmark) C Skovgaard (Denmark) M Kolding	14	18
3	(South Korea) Kim K-j (South Korea) Kim S-r	21	21

Second Round
(Malaysia) Goh VS (Malaysia) Lim KW	16	18
8	(Germany) I Kindervater (Germany) J Schoettler	21	21
(England) C Adcock (England) A Ellis	19	16
3	(South Korea) Kim K-j (South Korea) Kim S-r	21	21

Quarterfinals
8	(Germany) I Kindervater (Germany) J Schoettler	24	18
3	(South Korea) Kim K-j (South Korea) Kim S-r	26	21

==== Section 4 ====
First Round
(Austria) J Koch (Austria) P Zauner	21	13
Q3	(England) C Coles (England) M Nottingham	14	7^{r}
(Japan) H Saeki (Japan) R Taohata	10	16
6	(China) Chai B (China) Hong W	21	21
Q2	(Indonesia) B Septano (Indonesia) A Wirawan	21	21
Q4	(Germany) F Holzer (Germany) R Beck	16	13
Q1	(Thailand) B Issara (Thailand) P Vilailak	21	7	19
2	(Japan) H Endo (Japan) K Hayakawa	18	21	21

Second Round
(Austria) J Koch (Austria) P Zauner	11	10
6	(China) Chai B (China) Hong W	21	21
Q2	(Indonesia) B Septano (Indonesia) A Wirawan	10	14
2	(Japan) H Endo (Japan) K Hayakawa	21	21

Quarterfinals
6	(China) Chai B (China) Hong W	21	21
2	(Japan) H Endo (Japan) K Hayakawa	16	14

== Women's doubles ==
=== Seeds ===
1. (Japan) Misaki Matsutomo / Ayaka Takahashi (semi-final)
2. (South Korea) Eom Hye-won / Jang Ye-na (semi-final)
3. (Japan) Miyuki Maeda / Satoko Suetsuna (withdrew)
4. (South Korea) Jung Kyung-eun / Kim Ha-na (champion)
5. (China) Ma Jin / Tang Jinhua (final)
6. (Thailand) Duanganong Aroonkesorn / Kunchala Voravichitchaikul (first round)
7. (Hong Kong) Poon Lok Yan / Tse Ying Suet (second round)
8. (Russia) Valeria Sorokina / Nina Vislova (withdrew)

=== Finals ===
Semifinals
1	(Japan) Misaki Matsutomo (Japan) Ayaka Takahashi	20	17
4	(South Korea) Jung Kyung-eun (South Korea) Kim Ha-na	22	21
5	(China) Ma Jin (China) Tang Jinhua	21	21
2	(South Korea) Eom Hye-won (South Korea) Jang Ye-na	8	14

Final
4	(South Korea) Jung Kyung-eun (South Korea) Kim Ha-na	11	21	21
5	(China) Ma Jin (China) Tang Jinhua	21	14	13

=== Top half ===
==== Section 1 ====
First Round
1	(Japan) M Matsutomo (Japan) A Takahashi	21	21
Q2	(Chinese Taipei) Cheng W-h (Chinese Taipei) Hsieh P-c	17	15
Q3	(Germany) C Bott (Croatia) S Poznanovic	12	22	13
(Indonesia) G Imawan (Indonesia) T Nuraidah	21	20	21
PFQ	(Germany) I Herttrich (Germany) C Nelte	23	12
(Bulgaria) G Stoeva (Bulgaria) S Stoeva	25	21
(Denmark) L Kruse (Denmark) M Roepke	15	21	11
(Malaysia) Goh LY (Malaysia) Lim YL	21	12	21

Second Round
1	(Japan) M Matsutomo (Japan) A Takahashi	18	21	21
(Indonesia) G Imawan (Indonesia) T Nuraidah	21	14	13
(Bulgaria) G Stoeva (Bulgaria) S Stoeva	16	18
(Malaysia) Goh LY (Malaysia) Lim YL	21	21

Quarterfinals
1	(Japan) M Matsutomo (Japan) A Takahashi	21	21
(Malaysia) Goh LY (Malaysia) Lim YL	11	5

==== Section 2 ====
First Round
4	(South Korea) Jung K-e (South Korea) Kim H-n	21	21
(France) A Fontaine (France) E Lefel	10	13
(India) P Gadre (India) A Ponnappa	22	21
(Netherlands) S Barning (Netherlands) E Muskens	20	11
6	(Thailand) D Aroonkesorn (Thailand) K Voravichitchaikul	21	21	16
(England) L Smith (England) G White	19	23	21
(Germany) J Goliszewski (Germany) B Michels	21	21
PFQ	(Canada) G Gao (Canada) M Li	8	16

Second Round
4	(South Korea) Jung K-e (South Korea) Kim H-n	21	21
(India) P Gadre (India) A Ponnappa	13	16
(England) L Smith (England) G White	21	18	21
(Germany) J Goliszewski (Germany) B Michels	17	21	16

Quarterfinals
4	(South Korea) Jung K-e (South Korea) Kim H-n	21	21
(England) L Smith (England) G White	16	14

=== Bottom half ===
==== Section 3 ====
First Round
(Indonesia) A Awanda (Indonesia) G Polii	17	21	11
(South Korea) Lee S-h (South Korea) Shin S-c	21	19	21
(Malaysia) Chow MK (Malaysia) Lee MY	6	12
5	(China) Ma J (China) Tang JH	21	21
Q1	(China) Cheng S (China) Zhao YL	21	21
(Sweden) E Lennartsson (Sweden) E Wengberg	12	10
PFQ	(Indonesia) V Aprilsasi (Indonesia) V Marissa	21	21
PFQ	(Belgium) S Annys (Belgium) S Corvilain	15	12

Second Round
(South Korea) Lee S-h (South Korea) Shin S-c	15	12
5	(China) Ma J (China) Tang JH	21	21
Q1	(China) Cheng S (China) Zhao YL	21	21
PFQ	(Indonesia) V Aprilsasi (Indonesia) V Marissa	18	14

Quarterfinals
5	(China) Ma J (China) Tang JH	22	21
Q1	(China) Cheng S (China) Zhao YL	20	12

==== Section 4 ====
First Round
Q4	(Thailand) A Serithammarak (Thailand) P Munkitamorn	15	11
(South Korea) Choi H-i (South Korea) Kim S-y	21	21
(Netherlands) S Piek (Netherlands) I Tabeling	20	15
7	(Hong Kong) Poon LY (Hong Kong) Tse YS	22	21
PFQ	(Malaysia) V Hoo (Malaysia) Lai PJ	21	21
(Scotland) J Cooper (Scotland) K Gilmour	13	11
(England) H Olver (England) K Robertshaw	12	15
2	(South Korea) Eom H-w (South Korea) Jang Y-n	21	21

Second Round
(South Korea) Choi H-i (South Korea) Kim S-y	15	21	21
7	(Hong Kong) Poon LY (Hong Kong) Tse YS	21	19	18
PFQ	(Malaysia) V Hoo (Malaysia) Lai PJ	10	16
2	(South Korea) Eom H-w (South Korea) Jang Y-n	21	21

Quarterfinals
(South Korea) Choi H-i (South Korea) Kim S-y	21	9	13
2	(South Korea) Eom H-w (South Korea) Jang Y-n	11	21	21

== Mixed doubles ==
=== Seeds ===
1. (Malaysia) Chan Peng Soon / Goh Liu Ying (first round)
2. (Poland) Robert Mateusiak / Nadiezda Zieba (semi-final)
3. (Singapore) Danny Bawa Chrisnanta / Vannesa Neo Yu Yan (second round)
4. (Indonesia) Fran Kurniawan / Shendy Puspa Irawati (quarter-final)
5. (Indonesia) Riky Widianto / Richi Puspita Dili (first round)
6. (Germany) Michael Fuchs / Birgit Michels (second round)
7. (Denmark) Mads Pieler Kolding / Kamilla Rytter Juhl (first round)
8. (Japan) Kenichi Hayakawa / Misaki Matsutomo (quarter-final)

=== Finals ===
Semifinals
PFQ	(England) Chris Adcock (England) Gabrielle White	19	21	19
(Denmark) Anders Kristiansen (Denmark) Julie Houmann	21	19	21
(South Korea) Shin Baek-cheol (South Korea) Jang Ye-na	21	18	21
2	(Poland) Robert Mateusiak (Poland) Nadiezda Zieba	15	21	18

Final
(Denmark) Anders Kristiansen (Denmark) Julie Houmann	19	21	22
(South Korea) Shin Baek-cheol (South Korea) Jang Ye-na	21	19	24

=== Top half ===
==== Section 1 ====
First Round
1	(Malaysia) Chan PS (Malaysia) Goh LY	22	11	8
Q4	(China) Zhang N (China) Tang JH	20	21	21
(Netherlands) J de Ruiter (Netherlands) S Barning	16	15
(South Korea) Kim K-j (South Korea) Jung K-e	21	21
5	(Indonesia) R Widianto (Indonesia) R Dili	25	16	17
(India) T Kona (India) A Ponnappa	23	21	21
PFQ	(England) C Adcock (England) G White	21	24
(Croatia) Z Durkinjak (Croatia) S Poznanovic	12	22

Second Round
Q4	(China) Zhang N (China) Tang JH	21	19	21
(South Korea) Kim K-j (South Korea) Jung K-e	10	21	13
(India) T Kona (India) A Ponnappa	13	15
PFQ	(England) C Adcock (England) G White	21	21

Quarterfinals
Q4	(China) Zhang N (China) Tang JH	15	25	15
PFQ	(England) C Adcock (England) G White	21	23	21

==== Section 2 ====
First Round
3	(Singapore) D Chrisnanta (Singapore) V Neo	21	22
(Scotland) R Blair (Scotland) J Cooper	18	20
(France) B Careme (France) A Fontaine	23	6	16
(Denmark) A Kristiansen (Denmark) J Houmann	21	21	21
6	(Germany) M Fuchs (Germany) B Michels	21	21
(Switzerland) A Dumartheray (Switzerland) S Jaquet	19	15
(Thailand) S Anugritayawon (Thailand) K Voravichitchaikul	21	16	15
Q1	(China) Qiu ZH (China) Zhao YL	19	21	21

Second Round
3	(Singapore) D Chrisnanta (Singapore) V Neo	23	14	14
(Denmark) A Kristiansen (Denmark) J Houmann	21	21	21
6	(Germany) M Fuchs (Germany) B Michels	22	16
Q1	(China) Qiu ZH (China) Zhao YL	24	21

Quarterfinals
(Denmark) A Kristiansen (Denmark) J Houmann	21	20	21
Q1	(China) Qiu ZH (China) Zhao YL	16	22	15

=== Bottom half ===
==== Section 3 ====
First Round
Q2	(Thailand) B Issara (Thailand) P Munkitamorn	15	9
(Germany) P Kaesbauer (Germany) I Herttrich	21	21
(South Korea) Shin B-c (South Korea) Jang Y-n	21	21
7	(Denmark) M Kolding (Denmark) K Juhl	17	11
PFQ	(France) R Labar (France) L Choinet	19	21	12
(South Korea) Lee S-j (South Korea) Kim S-y	21	19	21
(Malaysia) Tan AQ (Malaysia) Lai PJ	13	16
4	(Indonesia) F Kurniawan (Indonesia) S Irawati	21	21

Second Round
(Germany) P Kaesbauer (Germany) I Herttrich	21	17	19
(South Korea) Shin B-c (South Korea) Jang Y-n	15	21	21
(South Korea) Lee S-j (South Korea) Kim S-y	13	14
4	(Indonesia) F Kurniawan (Indonesia) S Irawati	21	21

Quarterfinals
(South Korea) Shin B-c (South Korea) Jang Y-n	13	21	21
4	(Indonesia) F Kurniawan (Indonesia) S Irawati	21	14	16

==== Section 4 ====
First Round
(England) C Langridge (England) H Olver	19	21	17
(Malaysia) Ong JG (Malaysia) Lim YL	21	13	21
(Germany) M Schwenger (Germany) C Nelte	17	14
8	(Japan) K Hayakawa (Japan) M Matsutomo	21	21
Q3	(India) A Vishnu (India) A Balan	10	17
(Hong Kong) Lee CH (Hong Kong) Chau HW	21	21
PFQ	(Netherlands) J Arends (Netherlands) I Vaessen	17	13
2	(Poland) R Mateusiak (Poland) N Zieba	21	21

Second Round
(Malaysia) Ong JG (Malaysia) Lim YL	18	18
8	(Japan) K Hayakawa (Japan) M Matsutomo	21	21
(Hong Kong) Lee CH (Hong Kong) Chau HW	16	22
2	(Poland) R Mateusiak (Poland) N Zieba	21	24

Quarterfinals
8	(Japan) K Hayakawa (Japan) M Matsutomo	14	21	19
2	(Poland) R Mateusiak (Poland) N Zieba	21	18	21

Preceded by 2012 India Open Grand Prix Gold	BWF Grand Prix Gold and Grand Prix; 2013 season	Succeeded by 2013 Swiss Open Grand Prix Gold
