= 2013 French Super Series =

Badminton championships

Tournament details
- Dates: 22–27 October 2013
- Total prize money: US$200,000
- Venue: Stade Pierre De Coubertin
- Location: Paris

The 2013 French Super Series was a top level badminton competition which took place from October 22, 2013 to October 27, 2013 in Paris, France. It was the tenth BWF Super Series competition on the 2013 BWF Super Series schedule. The total purse for the event was $200,000. A qualification round was held for all five disciplines.

== Men's singles ==
=== Seeds ===
1. (Malaysia) Lee Chong Wei (semi-finals)
2. (China) Chen Long (withdrew)
3. (Japan) Kenichi Tago (final)
4. (Denmark) Jan Ø. Jørgensen (champion)
5. (Indonesia) Tommy Sugiarto (quarter-finals)
6. (Thailand) Boonsak Ponsana (quarter-finals)
7. (China) Wang Zhengming (second round)
8. (Germany) Marc Zwiebler (first round)

=== Top half ===
First Round
1	(Malaysia) Lee C W	22	21
(India) K Parupalli	20	12
(Japan) K Sakai	16	11
(India) A Jayaram	21	21
6	(Thailand) B Ponsana	15	21	21
(Malaysia) Liew D	21	15	19
(Hong Kong) Wong W K	14	21	10
Q4	(India) S Kidambi	21	17	21
3	(Japan) K Tago	21	21
(Chinese Taipei) Chou T-c	15	19
(Japan) S Sasaki	21	13	21
(Malaysia) Chong W F	19	21	13
5	(Indonesia) T Sugiarto	21	21
(England) R Ouseph	16	14
(India) R.M.V. Gurusai D	9	14
(China) Chen YK	21	21

Second Round
1	(Malaysia) Lee C W	21	21
(India) A Jayaram	18	18
6	(Thailand) B Ponsana	15	21	21
Q4	(India) S Kidambi	21	18	15
3	(Japan) K Tago	21	24
(Japan) S Sasaki	15	22
5	(Indonesia) T Sugiarto	21	21
(China) Chen YK	18	13

Quarterfinals
1	(Malaysia) Lee C W	21	21
6	(Thailand) B Ponsana	13	17
3	(Japan) K Tago	21	23
5	(Indonesia) T Sugiarto	19	21

Semifinals
1	(Malaysia) Lee C W	21	16	12
3	(Japan) K Tago	17	21	21

=== Bottom half ===
First Round
(Denmark) V Axelsen	12	9
(Indonesia) D H Rumbaka	21	21
(Indonesia) S D Kuncoro	21	16	21
8	(Germany) M Zwiebler	19	21	9
(Denmark) H-K Vittinghus	21
Q2	(India) Sai Praneeth B.	18^{r}
(Netherlands) E Pang	12	18
4	(Denmark) J Ø Jørgensen	21	21
(Hong Kong) Hu Y	10	21	21
(Japan) K Momota	21	13	18
(Japan) T Ueda	21	21	11
7	(China) Wang ZM	23	16	21
Q1	(France) T Rouxel	9	22
Q3	(India) A Pawar	21	24
(Thailand) T Saensomboonsuk	21	20	21
PFQ	(South Korea) Lee D-k	10	22	17

Second Round
(Indonesia) D H Rumbaka	21	17	24
(Indonesia) S D Kuncoro	15	21	22
(Denmark) H-K Vittinghus	19	17
4	(Denmark) J Ø Jørgensen	21	21
(Hong Kong) Hu Y	w	/	o
7	(China) Wang ZM
Q3	(India) A Pawar	20	18
(Thailand) T Saensomboonsuk	22	21

Quarterfinals
(Indonesia) D H Rumbaka	19	13
4	(Denmark) J Ø Jørgensen	21	21
(Hong Kong) Hu Y	15	19
(Thailand) T Saensomboonsuk	21	21

Semifinals
4	(Denmark) J Ø Jørgensen	21	18	21
(Thailand) T Saensomboonsuk	18	21	10

=== Finals ===
Semifinals
1	(Malaysia) Lee Chong Wei	21	16	12
3	(Japan) Kenichi Tago	17	21	21
4	(Denmark) Jan Ø. Jørgensen	21	18	21
(Thailand) Tanongsak Saensomboonsuk	18	21	10

Final
3	(Japan) Kenichi Tago	19	21
4	(Denmark) Jan Ø. Jørgensen	21	23

== Women's singles ==
=== Seeds ===
1. (China) Li Xuerui
2. (Thailand) Ratchanok Intanon
3. (Germany) Juliane Schenk
4. (India) Saina Nehwal
5. (China) Wang Yihan
6. (South Korea) Sung Ji-hyun
7. (China) Wang Shixian
8. (Chinese Taipei) Tai Tzu-ying

=== Top half ===
First Round
PFQ	(Republic of Ireland) C Magee	21	24
(Singapore) Gu J	16	22
(Bulgaria) P Nedelcheva	13	11
(Japan) E Hirose	21	21
8	(Chinese Taipei) Tai T-y	22	21
(Hong Kong) Yip P Y	20	9
Q4	(Singapore) Chen JY	11
(Japan) S Takahashi	5^{r}
3	(Germany) J Schenk	21	21
(Japan) K Imabeppu	13	16
Q2	(Switzerland) S Jaquet	20	11
(Japan) M Mitani	22	21
PFQ	(India) A Pantawane	17	21	14
(Thailand) P Buranaprasertsuk	21	16	21
(Indonesia) L Fanetri	13	21	10
(Hong Kong) Chan T K	21	15	21

Second Round
PFQ	(Republic of Ireland) C Magee	14	5
(Japan) E Hirose	21	21
8	(Chinese Taipei) Tai T-y	21	21
Q4	(Singapore) Chen JY	17	19
3	(Germany) J Schenk	18	14
(Japan) M Mitani	21	21
(Thailand) P Buranaprasertsuk	19	21	21
(Hong Kong) Chan T K	21	17	11

Quarterfinals
(Japan) E Hirose	11	21	21
8	(Chinese Taipei) Tai T-y	21	14	18
(Japan) M Mitani	21	12	16
(Thailand) P Buranaprasertsuk	18	21	21

Semifinals
(Japan) Eriko Hirose	13	8
(Thailand) P Buranaprasertsuk	21	21

=== Bottom half ===
First Round
(Scotland) K Gilmour	21	17	21
(Czech Republic) K Gavnholt	12	21	19
(India) P V Sindhu	21	21
6	(South Korea) Sung J-h	8	12
(South Korea) Bae Y-j	21	11
Q3	(Russia) K Polikarpova	9	3^{r}
(Thailand) N Jindapol	21	16	13
4	(India) S Nehwal	12	21	21
(France) S V Waran	21	21
(Bulgaria) L Zechiri	17	16
PFQ	(China) S Yu	16	18
7	(China) Wang SX	21	21
Q1	(Russia) E Diehl	14	19
(Germany) K Schnaase	21	21
(China) Han L	18	18
2	(Thailand) R Intanon	21	21

Second Round
(Scotland) K Gilmour	10	21	21
(India) P V Sindhu	21	19	16
(South Korea) Bae Y-j	20	21	22
4	(India) S Nehwal	22	15	20
(France) S V Waran	6	10
7	(China) Wang SX	21	21
(Germany) K Schnaase	16	13
2	(Thailand) R Intanon	21	21

Quarterfinals
(Scotland) K Gilmour	21	14	15
(South Korea) Bae Y-j	19	21	21
7	(China) Wang SX	21	22
2	(Thailand) R Intanon	10	20

Semifinals
(South Korea) Bae Y-j	19	20
7	(China) Wang SX	21	22

=== Finals ===
Semifinals
(Japan) Eriko Hirose	13	8
(Thailand) Porntip Buranaprasertsuk	21	21
(South Korea) Bae Yeon-ju	19	20
7	(China) Wang Shixian	21	22

Final
(Thailand) Porntip Buranaprasertsuk	18	18
7	(China) Wang Shixian	21	21

== Men's doubles ==
=== Seeds ===
1. (Indonesia) Mohammad Ahsan / Hendra Setiawan (withdrew)
2. (Denmark) Mathias Boe / Carsten Mogensen (quarter-finals)
3. (Japan) Hiroyuki Endo / Kenichi Hayakawa (second round)
4. (Malaysia) Koo Kien Keat / Tan Boon Heong (final)
5. (China) Liu Xiaolong / Qiu Zihan (semi-finals)
6. (South Korea) Kim Gi-jung / Kim Sa-rang (second round)
7. (South Korea) Ko Sung-hyun / Shin Baek-cheol (quarter-finals)
8. (South Korea) Lee Yong-dae / Yoo Yeon-seong (quarter-finals)

=== Top half ===
First Round
PFQ	(Germany) P Käsbauer (Germany) J Zurwonne	21	18	19
(Hong Kong) Chan Y L (Hong Kong) Lee C H	15	21	21
(Poland) A Cwałina (Poland) P Wacha	19	21	15
(Malaysia) Hoon T H (Malaysia) Tan W K	21	18	21
8	(South Korea) Lee Y-d (South Korea) Yoo Y-s	21	22	21
(China) Fu HF (China) Hong W	17	24	14
Q4	(France) L Constantin (France) M L Y Ping	9	17
(Thailand) M Jongjit (Thailand) N Puangpuapech	21	21
4	(Malaysia) Koo K K (Malaysia) Tan B H	18	21	21
(Japan) H Hashimoto (Japan) N Hirata	21	17	16
(Germany) M Fuchs (Germany) J Schöttler	26	18	21
(England) C Langridge (England) P Mills	24	21	16
6	(South Korea) Kim K-j (South Korea) Kim S-r	21	20	21
(Japan) H Saeki (Japan) R Taohata	16	22	15
(England) C Adcock (England) A Ellis	21	23	21
(China) Cai Y (China) Chai B	16	25	18

Second Round
(Hong Kong) Chan Y L (Hong Kong) Lee C H	18	18
(Malaysia) Hoon T H (Malaysia) Tan W K	21	21
8	(South Korea) Lee Y-d (South Korea) Yoo Y-s	21	21
(Thailand) M Jongjit (Thailand) N Puangpuapech	16	12
4	(Malaysia) Koo K K (Malaysia) Tan B H	21	21
(Germany) M Fuchs (Germany) J Schöttler	19	19
6	(South Korea) Kim K-j (South Korea) Kim S-r	20	21	18
(England) C Adcock (England) A Ellis	22	19	21

Quarterfinals
(Malaysia) Hoon T H (Malaysia) Tan W K	21	21
8	(South Korea) Lee Y-d (South Korea) Yoo Y-s	13	10
4	(Malaysia) Koo K K (Malaysia) Tan B H	21	15	21
(England) C Adcock (England) A Ellis	11	21	17

Semifinals
(Malaysia) Hoon T H (Malaysia) Tan W K	19	21	18
4	(Malaysia) Koo K K (Malaysia) Tan B H	21	15	21

=== Bottom half ===
First Round
(Japan) T Kamura (Japan) K Sonoda	25	21
(Indonesia) A Pratama (Indonesia) R A Saputro	23	16
(Netherlands) J Arends (Netherlands) J Maas	17	16
7	(South Korea) Ko S-h (South Korea) Shin B-c	21	21
Q2	(Indonesia) M F Gideon (Indonesia) M Kido	21	21
(Netherlands) R Bosch (Netherlands) K Ridder	12	15
Q1	(France) L Corvee (France) B Leverdez	8	17
3	(Japan) H Endo (Japan) K Hayakawa	21	21
(Germany) I Kindervater (Germany) M Schwenger	16	16
(England) C Coles (England) M Nottingham	21	21
PFQ	(Belgium) M Dierickx (Belgium) F Golinski	12	16
5	(China) Liu XL (China) Qiu ZH	21	21
(Thailand) W Ampunsuwan (Thailand) P Chalardchaleam	19	18
(Poland) Ł Moren (Poland) W Szkudlarczyk	21	21
Q3	(Denmark) M Conrad-Petersen (Denmark) M Pieler Kolding	15	15
2	(Denmark) M Boe (Denmark) C Mogensen	21	21

Second Round
(Japan) T Kamura (Japan) K Sonoda	14	16
7	(South Korea) Ko S-h (South Korea) Shin B-c	21	21
Q2	(Indonesia) M F Gideon (Indonesia) M Kido	21	19	21
3	(Japan) H Endo (Japan) K Hayakawa	13	21	16
(England) C Coles (England) M Nottingham	21	11
5	(China) Liu XL (China) Qiu ZH	21	21
(Poland) Ł Moren (Poland) W Szkudlarczyk	9	11
2	(Denmark) M Boe (Denmark) C Mogensen	21	21

Quarterfinals
7	(South Korea) Ko S-h (South Korea) Shin B-c	21	17
Q2	(Indonesia) M F Gideon (Indonesia) M Kido	23	21
5	(China) Liu XL (China) Qiu ZH	23	21
2	(Denmark) M Boe (Denmark) C Mogensen	21	7

Semifinals
Q2	(Indonesia) M F Gideon (Indonesia) M Kido	16	21	21
5	(China) Liu XL (China) Qiu ZH	21	19	14

=== Finals ===
Semifinals
(Malaysia) Hoon Thien How (Malaysia) Tan Wee Kiong	19	21	18
4	(Malaysia) Koo Kien Keat (Malaysia) Tan Boon Heong	21	15	21
Q2	(Indonesia) Marcus Fernaldi Gideon (Indonesia) Markis Kido	16	21	21
5	(China) Liu Xiaolong (China) Qiu Zihan	21	19	14

Final
4	(Malaysia) Koo Kien Keat (Malaysia) Tan Boon Heong	16	18
Q2	(Indonesia) Marcus Fernaldi Gideon (Indonesia) Markis Kido	21	21

== Women's doubles ==
=== Seeds ===
1. (China) Wang Xiaoli / Yu Yang
2. (Denmark) Christinna Pedersen / Kamilla Rytter Juhl
3. (Japan) Misaki Matsutomo / Ayaka Takahashi
4. (South Korea) Jung Kyung-eun / Kim Ha-na
5. (China) Tian Qing / Zhao Yunlei
6. (Indonesia) Pia Zebadiah Bernadeth / Rizki Amelia Pradipta
7. (China) Ma Jin / Zhong Qianxin
8. (Thailand) Duanganong Aroonkesorn / Kunchala Voravichitchaikul

=== Top half ===
First Round
1	(China) Wang XL (China) Yu Y	21	21
(Germany) I Herttrich (Germany) C Nelte	14	12
(England) L Smith (England) G White	18	20
(Scotland) I Bankier (Bulgaria) P Nedelcheva	21	22
7	(China) M Jin (China) Zhong QX	21	21
(Netherlands) E Muskens (Netherlands) S Piek	17	18
(Indonesia) N K Maheswari (Indonesia) G Polii	21	21
(France) A Fontaine (France) E Lefel	9	11
4	(South Korea) Jung K-e (South Korea) Kim H-n	21	21
(Russia) I Khlebko (Russia) K Polikarpova	11	10
(Japan) R Kakiiwa (Japan) M Maeda	21	21
Q3	(Switzerland) A Huser (Switzerland) S Jaquet	7	11
6	(Indonesia) P Z Bernadeth (Indonesia) R A Pradipta	21	21
(Belgium) S Annys (Belgium) S Corvilain	14	14
(China) Bao YX (China) Tang JH	11
(South Korea) Eom H-w (South Korea) Shin S-c	5^{r}

Second Round
1	(China) Wang XL (China) Yu Y	21	21
(Scotland) I Bankier (Bulgaria) P Nedelcheva	13	19
7	(China) Ma J (China) Zhong QX	14	22
(Indonesia) N K Maheswari (Indonesia) G Polii	21	24
4	(South Korea) Jung K-e (South Korea) Kim H-n	18	12
(Japan) R Kakiiwa (Japan) M Maeda	21	21
6	(Indonesia) P Z Bernadeth (Indonesia) R A Pradipta	11	14
(China) Bao YX (China) Tang JH	21	21

Quarterfinals
1	(China) Wang XL (China) Yu Y	17	21	21
(Indonesia) N K Maheswari (Indonesia) G Polii	21	14	23
(Japan) R Kakiiwa (Japan) M Maeda	14	20
(China) Bao YX (China) Tang JH	21	22

Semifinals
(Indonesia) N K Maheswari (Indonesia) G Polii	21	10	19
(China) Bao YX (China) Tang JH	19	21	21

=== Bottom half ===
First Round
(Japan) Y Miki (Japan) K Yonemoto	21	21
(England) H Olver (England) K Robertshaw	9	13
(Indonesia) A P L Variella (Indonesia) V Marissa	13	10
5	(China) Tian Q (China) Zhao YL	21	21
(India) J Gutta (India) A Ponnappa	18	21	17
(Indonesia) G R Imawan (Indonesia) T R Nuraidah	21	13	21
(Scotland) J Cooper (Scotland) K Gilmour	11	7
3	(Japan) M Matsutomo (Japan) A Takahashi	21	21
(Denmark) L Damkjær Kruse (Denmark) M Rœpke	21	21
Q2	(France) A Chaillou (France) J Piron	13	14
(South Korea) Chang Y-n (South Korea) Kim S-y	21	18	21
8	(Thailand) D Aroonkesorn (Thailand) K Voravichitchaikul	15	21	17
Q1	(France) L Baumann (France) T V Waran	9	9
(Germany) J Goliszewski (Germany) B Michels	21	21
Q4	(France) E Danckers (France) A Vanderstukken	7	9
2	(Denmark) C Pedersen (Denmark) K Rytter Juhl	21	21

Second Round
(Japan) Y Miki (Japan) K Yonemoto	9	15
5	(China) Tian Q (China) Zhao YL	21	21
(Indonesia) G R Imawan (Indonesia) T R Nuraidah	15	15
3	(Japan) M Matsutomo (Japan) A Takahashi	21	21
(Denmark) L Damkjær Kruse (Denmark) M Rœpke	11	11
(South Korea) Chang Y-n (South Korea) Kim S-y	21	21
(Germany) J Goliszewski (Germany) B Michels	14	10
2	(Denmark) C Pedersen (Denmark) K Rytter Juhl	21	21

Quarterfinals
5	(China) Tian Q (China) Zhao YL	22	13	23
3	(Japan) M Matsutomo (Japan) A Takahashi	20	21	21
(South Korea) Chang Y-n (South Korea) Kim S-y	21	25
2	(Denmark) C Pedersen (Denmark) K Rytter Juhl	19	23

Semifinals
5	(China) Tian Q (China) Zhao YL	16	21	21
(South Korea) Chang Y-n (South Korea) Kim S-y	21	17	10

=== Finals ===
Semifinals
(Indonesia) Nitya Krishinda Maheswari (Indonesia) Greysia Polii	21	10	19
(China) Bao Yixin (China) Tang Jinhua	19	21	21
5	(China) Tian Qing (China) Zhao Yunlei	16	21	21
(South Korea) Jang Ye-na (South Korea) Kim So-young	21	17	10

Final
(China) Bao Yixin (China) Tang Jinhua	21	21
5	(China) Tian Qing (China) Zhao Yunlei	13	17

== Mixed doubles ==
=== Seeds ===
1. (China) Zhang Nan / Zhao Yunlei
2. (China) Xu Chen / Ma Jin
3. (Indonesia) Tontowi Ahmad / Liliyana Natsir
4. (Denmark) Joachim Fischer Nielsen / Christinna Pedersen
5. (Malaysia) Chan Peng Soon / Goh Liu Ying
6. (South Korea) Ko Sung-hyun / Kim Ha-na
7. (Thailand) Sudket Prapakamol / Saralee Thungthongkam
8. (Indonesia) Markis Kido / Pia Zebadiah Bernadeth

=== Top half ===
First Round
1	(China) Zhang N (China) Zhao YL	21	21
(Japan) T Kamura (Japan) K Yonemoto	14	9
(India) K Tarun (India) A Ponnappa	17	21	12
(Scotland) R Blair (Scotland) I Bankier	21	19	21
5	(Malaysia) Chan P S (Malaysia) Goh L Y	19	21	25
(Japan) H Hashimoto (Japan) M Maeda	21	16	23
(England) C Langridge (England) H Olver	25	21
(Denmark) A Kristiansen (Denmark) J Houmann	23	17
3	(Indonesia) T Ahmad (Indonesia) L Natsir	w	/	o
(South Korea) Shin B-c (South Korea) Eom H-w
(Indonesia) R Widianto (Indonesia) R P Dili	19	18
Q2	(South Korea) Lee Y-d (South Korea) Shin S-c	21	21
8	(Indonesia) M Kido (Indonesia) P Z Bernadeth	21	22	21
Q4	(China) Chai B (China) Tang JH	13	24	16
(Germany) P Käsbauer (Germany) I Herttrich	12	18
(England) C Adcock (England) G White	21	21

Second Round
1	(China) Zhang N (China) Zhao YL	21	21
(Scotland) R Blair (Scotland) I Bankier	15	14
5	(Malaysia) Chan P S (Malaysia) Goh L Y	21	21
(England) C Langridge (England) H Olver	18	17
3	(Indonesia) T Ahmad (Indonesia) L Natsir	21	21
Q2	(South Korea) Lee Y-d (South Korea) Shin S-c
8	(Indonesia) M Kido (Indonesia) P Z Bernadeth	8	8
(England) C Adcock (England) G White	21	21

Quarterfinals
1	(China) Zhang N (China) Zhao YL	21	21
5	(Malaysia) Chan P S (Malaysia) Goh L Y	14	12
3	(Indonesia) T Ahmad (Indonesia) L Natsir	20	17
(England) A Adcock (England) G White	22	21

Semifinals
1	(China) Zhang N (China) Zhao YL	18	21	21
(England) C Adcock (England) G White	21	14	13

=== Bottom half ===
First Round
(South Korea) Yoo Y-s (South Korea) Chang Y-n	17	19
(Germany) M Fuchs (Germany) B Michels	21	21
Q1	(Thailand) M Jongjit (Thailand) S Taerattanachai	18	14
7	(Thailand) S Prapakamol (Thailand) S Thungthongkam	21	21
(Poland) R Mateusiak (Poland) A Wojtkowska	21	13	18
(Japan) K Hayakawa (Japan) M Matsutomo	17	21	21
Q3	(Netherlands) J Arends (Netherlands) S Piek	21	21
PFQ	(India) M Attri (India) J Gutta	13	16
(South Korea) Kim K-j (South Korea) Kim S-y	21	21
(Republic of Ireland) S Magee (Republic of Ireland) C Magee	15	15
(Indonesia) P Jordan (Indonesia) V Marissa	22	21
6	(South Korea) Ko S-h (South Korea) Kim H-n	20	18
(Hong Kong) Lee C H (Hong Kong) Chau H W	21	21
(Sweden) N Ruponen (Sweden) A Hogstrom	10	16
(Denmark) M Pieler Kolding (Denmark) K Rytter Juhl	11	19
2	(China) Xu C (China) Ma J	21	21

Second Round
(Germany) M Fuchs (Germany) B Michels	17	22	12
7	(Thailand) S Prapakamol (Thailand) S Thungthongkam	21	20	21
(Japan) K Hayakawa (Japan) M Matsutomo	19	21	21
Q3	(Netherlands) J Arends (Netherlands) S Piek	21	16	19
(South Korea) Kim K-j (South Korea) Kim S-y	14	13
(Indonesia) P Jordan (Indonesia) V Marissa	21	21
(Hong Kong) Lee C H (Hong Kong) Chau H W	11	19
2	(China) Xu C (China) Ma J	21	21

Quarterfinals
7	(Thailand) S Prapakamol (Thailand) S Thungthongkam	21	21
(Japan) K Hayakawa (Japan) M Matsutomo	15	19
(Indonesia) P Jordan (Indonesia) V Marissa	12	23
2	(China) Xu C (China) Ma J	21	25

Semifinals
7	(Thailand) S Prapakamol (Thailand) S Thungthongkam	12	19
2	(China) Xu C (China) Ma J	21	21

=== Finals ===
Semifinals
1	(China) Zhang Nan (China) Zhao Yunlei	18	21	21
(England) Chris Adcock (England) Gabrielle White	21	14	13
7	(Thailand) Sudket Prapakamol (Thailand) Saralee Thungthongkam	12	19
2	(China) Xu Chen (China) Ma Jin	21	21

Final
1	(China) Zhang Nan (China) Zhao Yunlei	28	21
2	(China) Xu Chen (China) Ma Jin	26	17
