= 2015 BWF World Championships – Men's doubles =

Badminton tournament

Men's doubles at the 2015 BWF World Championships
- Venue: Istora Senayan
- Location: Jakarta, Indonesia
- Dates: August 10, 2015 – August 16, 2015

Medalists
gold medal	Mohammad Ahsan; Hendra Setiawan	Indonesia
silver medal	Liu Xiaolong; Qiu Zihan	China
bronze medal	Lee Yong-dae; Yoo Yeon-seong	South Korea
bronze medal	Hiroyuki Endo; Kenichi Hayakawa	Japan

The men's doubles tournament of the 2015 BWF World Championships (World Badminton Championships) took place from August 10 to 16. Ko Sung-hyun and Shin Baek-cheol entered the competition as the reigning champions, but lost to Goh V Shem and Tan Wee Kiong in the second round.

== Seeds ==
1. (South Korea) Lee Yong-dae / Yoo Yeon-seong (semifinals)
2. (Denmark) Mathias Boe / Carsten Mogensen (quarterfinals)
3. (Indonesia) Mohammad Ahsan / Hendra Setiawan (champion)
4. (China) Chai Biao / Hong Wei (second round)
5. (China) Fu Haifeng / Zhang Nan (quarterfinals)
6. (Japan) Hiroyuki Endo / Kenichi Hayakawa (semifinals)
7. (South Korea) Ko Sung-hyun / Shin Baek-cheol (second round)
8. (Chinese Taipei) Lee Sheng-mu / Tsai Chia-hsin (second round)
9. (China) Liu Xiaolong / Qiu Zihan (final)
10. (Denmark) Mads Conrad-Petersen / Mads Pieler Kolding (third round)
11. (Russia) Vladimir Ivanov / Ivan Sozonov (second round)
12. (South Korea) Kim Ki-jung / Kim Sa-rang (third round)
13. (Indonesia) Angga Pratama / Ricky Karanda Suwardi (quarterfinals)
14. (Japan) Kenta Kazuno / Kazushi Yamada (third round)
15. (Denmark) Kim Astrup / Anders Skaarup Rasmussen (third round)
16. (Japan) Hirokatsu Hashimoto / Noriyasu Hirata (third round)

Click on the seed number of a team to go to their draw section.

== Draw ==
=== Finals ===
Quarterfinals
1	(South Korea) Lee Yong-dae (South Korea) Yoo Yeon-seong	21	21
5	(China) Fu Haifeng (China) Zhang Nan	15	18
3	(Indonesia) Mohammad Ahsan (Indonesia) Hendra Setiawan	21	22
(England) Marcus Ellis (England) Chris Langridge	16	20
6	(Japan) Hiroyuki Endo (Japan) Kenichi Hayakawa	21	14	21
13	(Indonesia) Angga Pratama (Indonesia) Ricky Karanda Suwardi	17	21	18
9	(China) Liu Xiaolong (China) Qiu Zihan	21	21
2	(Denmark) Mathias Boe (Denmark) Carsten Mogensen	15	19

Semifinals
1	(South Korea) Lee Yong-dae (South Korea) Yoo Yeon-seong	17	19
3	(Indonesia) Mohammad Ahsan (Indonesia) Hendra Setiawan	21	21
6	(Japan) Hiroyuki Endo (Japan) Kenichi Hayakawa	16	23	20
9	(China) Liu Xiaolong (China) Qiu Zihan	21	21	22

Final
3	(Indonesia) Mohammad Ahsan (Indonesia) Hendra Setiawan	21	21
9	(China) Liu Xiaolong (China) Qiu Zihan	17	14

=== Section 1 ===
First Round
(Scotland) M Campbell (Scotland) P MacHugh	w	/	o
(Guatemala) J Solís (Guatemala) R Ramírez
(Netherlands) J Arends (Netherlands) J Maas	18	18
(Germany) M Fuchs (Germany) J Schöttler	21	21
(Indonesia) A Adistia (Indonesia) H A Gunawan	21	21
(United States) M Fogarty (United States) B Seguin	18	8

Second Round
1	(South Korea) Lee Y-d (South Korea) Yoo Y-s	21	21
(South Africa) A Malan (South Africa) W Viljoen	14	10
12	(South Korea) Kim G-j (South Korea) Kim S-r	21	21
(Scotland) M Campbell (Scotland) P MacHugh	12	9
5	(China) Fu HF (China) Zhang N	21	21
(Germany) M Fuchs (Germany) J Schöttler	13	8
15	(Denmark) K Astrup (Denmark) A S Rasmussen	21	21
(Indonesia) A Adistia (Indonesia) H A Gunawan	17	17

Third Round
1	(South Korea) Lee Y-d (South Korea) Yoo Y-s	21	21
12	(South Korea) Kim G-j (South Korea) Kim S-r	13	15
5	(China) Fu HF (China) Zhang N	21	21
15	(Denmark) K Astrup (Denmark) A S Rasmussen	16	17

Quarterfinals
1	(South Korea) Lee Y-d (South Korea) Yoo Y-s	21	21
5	(China) Fu HF (China) Zhang N	15	18

=== Section 2 ===
First Round
(France) B Careme (France) R Labar	21	17	21
(Philippines) P G Magnaye (Philippines) P J Vivas	10	21	10
(Canada) A Liu (Canada) D Ng	21	25
(Australia) M Chau (Australia) S Serasinghe	6	23
(Italy) G Greco (Italy) R Maddaloni	12	14
(England) M Ellis (England) C Langridge	21	21
(Russia) N Khakimov (Russia) V Kuznetsov	21	11	11
(India) P J Chopra (India) A Dewalker	17	21	21

Second Round
3	(Indonesia) M Ahsan (Indonesia) H Setiawan	19	21	21
(France) B Careme (France) R Labar	21	17	18
14	(Japan) K Kazuno (Japan) K Yamada	21	21
(Canada) A Liu (Canada) D Ng	18	13
8	(Chinese Taipei) Lee S-m (Chinese Taipei) Tsai C-h	19	11
(England) M Ellis (England) C Langridge	21	21
10	(Denmark) M Conrad-Petersen (Denmark) M Pieler Kolding	21	21
(India) P J Chopra (India) A Dewalker	16	12

Third Round
3	(Indonesia) M Ahsan (Indonesia) H Setiawan	21	19	21
14	(Japan) K Kazuno (Japan) K Yamada	16	21	15
(England) M Ellis (England) C Langridge	17	21	21
10	(Denmark) M Conrad-Petersen (Denmark) M Pieler Kolding	21	18	19

Quarterfinals
3	(Indonesia) M Ahsan (Indonesia) H Setiawan	21	22
(England) M Ellis (England) C Langridge	16	20

=== Section 3 ===
First Round
(Germany) R Beck (Germany) A Heinz
(Indonesia) W Nayaka (Indonesia) A Yusuf	w	/	o
(Poland) A Cwalina (Poland) P Wacha	21	21
(England) A Ellis (England) P Mills	19	14
(Thailand) K Ketlen (Thailand) D Puavaranukroh	21	21
(Canada) K Li (Canada) N Yakura	15	14
(Philippines) P J Escueta (Philippines) R Estanislao	19	14
(Japan) T Kamura (Japan) K Sonoda	21	21

Second Round
(Indonesia) W Nayaka (Indonesia) A Yusuf	20	21	21
11	(Russia) V Ivanov (Russia) I Sozonov	21	19	16
(Poland) A Cwalina (Poland) P Wacha	18	21	10
6	(Japan) H Endo (Japan) K Hayakawa	21	17	21
(Thailand) K Ketlen (Thailand) D Puavaranukroh	17	13
13	(Indonesia) A Pratama (Indonesia) R K Suwardi	21	21
(Japan) T Kamura (Japan) K Sonoda	18	21	21
4	(China) Chai B (China) Hong W	21	17	13

Third Round
(Indonesia) W Nayaka (Indonesia) A Yusuf	15	14
6	(Japan) H Endo (Japan) K Hayakawa	21	21
13	(Indonesia) A Pratama (Indonesia) R K Suwardi	21	21
(Japan) T Kamura (Japan) K Sonoda	19	17

Quarterfinals
6	(Japan) H Endo (Japan) K Hayakawa	21	14	21
13	(Indonesia) A Pratama (Indonesia) R K Suwardi	17	21	18

=== Section 4 ===
First Round
(Peru) M Cuba (Peru) M Del Valle	12	18
(Belgium) M Dierickx (Belgium) F Golinski	21	21
(Malaysia) Goh V S (Malaysia) Tan W K	21	18	21
(United States) P Chew (United States) S Pongnairat	8	21	9
(India) M Attri (India) B S Reddy	9	7
(China) Cai Y (China) Lu K	21	21

Second Round
(Belgium) M Dierickx (Belgium) F Golinski	11	12
9	(China) Liu XL (China) Qiu ZH	21	21
(Malaysia) Goh V S (Malaysia) Tan W K	21	21
7	(South Korea) Ko S-h (South Korea) Shin B-c	12	15
(China) Cai Y (China) Lu K	21	18	21
16	(Japan) H Hashimoto (Japan) N Hirata	12	21	23
(Chinese Taipei) Chen H-l (Chinese Taipei) Wang C-l	15	23	8
2	(Denmark) M Boe (Denmark) C Mogensen	21	21	21

Third Round
9	(China) Liu XL (China) Qiu ZH	21	21
(Malaysia) Goh V S (Malaysia) Tan W K	18	18
16	(Japan) H Hashimoto (Japan) N Hirata	14	11
2	(Denmark) M Boe (Denmark) C Mogensen	21	21

Quarterfinals
9	(China) Liu XL (China) Qiu ZH	21	21
2	(Denmark) M Boe (Denmark) C Mogensen	15	19
