= Liu Xiaolong =

Chinese badminton player (born 1988)

Liu Xiaolong 刘小龙
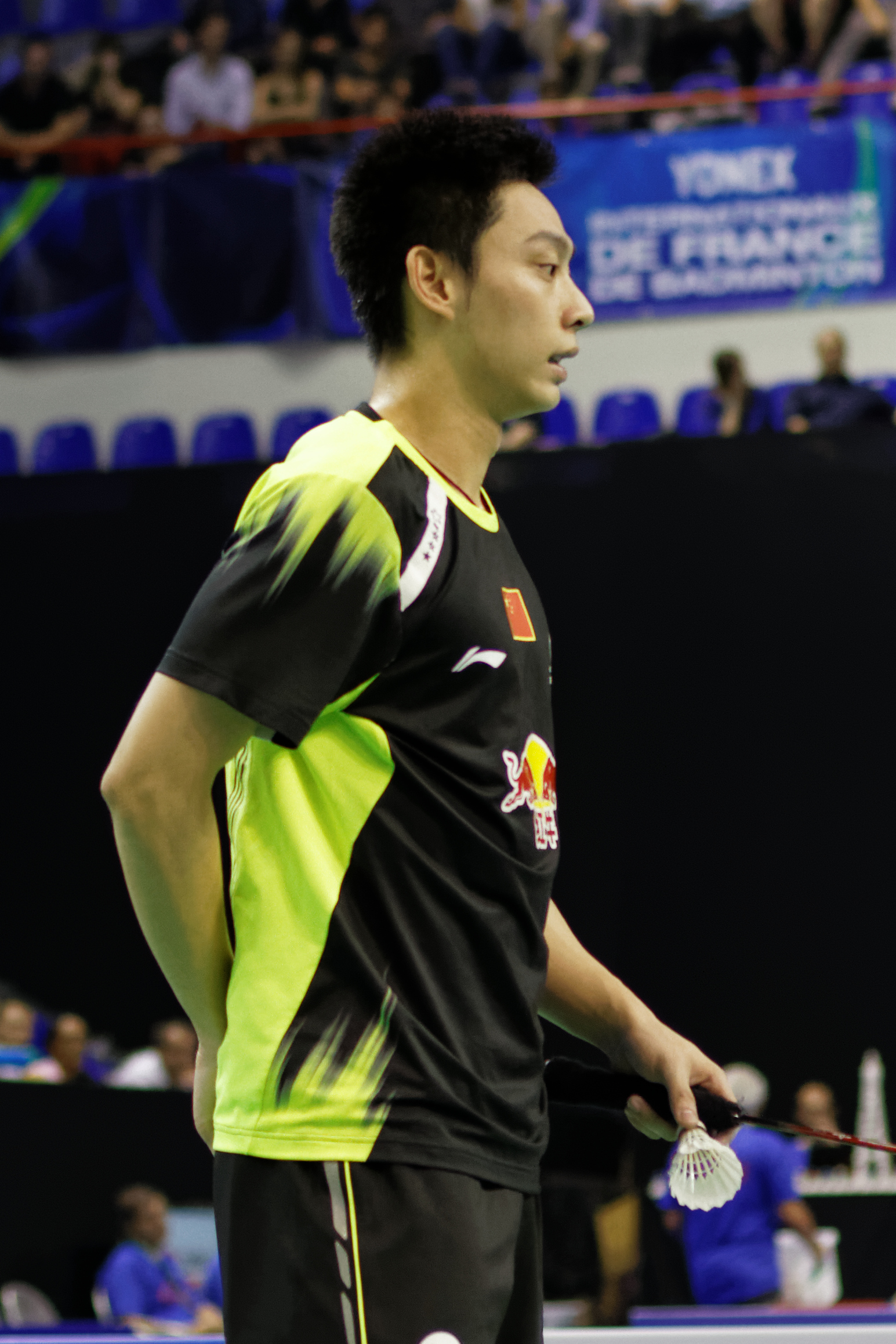

Personal information
- Born: 12 May 1988 (age 38) Zhangzhou, Fujian, China
- Height: 1.76 m (5 ft 9 in)
- Weight: 70 kg (154 lb)

Sport
- Country: China
- Sport: Badminton
- Handedness: Left
- Retired: 26 June 2017

Men's doubles
- Highest ranking: 4 (with Qiu Zihan 26 March 2015)
- BWF profile
Medal record
Men's badminton
Representing China
World Championships
Silver medal – second place	2015 Jakarta	Men's doubles
Sudirman Cup
Gold medal – first place	2013 Kuala Lumpur	Mixed team
Thomas Cup
Bronze medal – third place	2014 New Delhi	Men's team
Asian Games
Silver medal – second place	2014 Incheon	Men's team
Asian Championships
Silver medal – second place	2009 Suwon	Men's doubles
East Asian Games
Gold medal – first place	2013 Tianjin	Men's team
Gold medal – first place	2009 Hong Kong	Men's team
World Junior Championships
Silver medal – second place	2006 Incheon	Boys' doubles
Silver medal – second place	2006 Incheon	Mixed team
Bronze medal – third place	2006 Incheon	Mixed doubles
Asian Junior Championships
Bronze medal – third place	2006 Kuala Lumpur	Mixed doubles
Bronze medal – third place	2006 Kuala Lumpur	Mixed team

Liu Xiaolong (Chinese: 刘小龙; born 12 May 1988) is a Chinese badminton player who is a doubles specialist. A left handler, he is the former winner of the All England Championships. He was part of China winning team at the 2013 Sudirman Cup. He announced his retirement on international tournament on 26 June 2017.

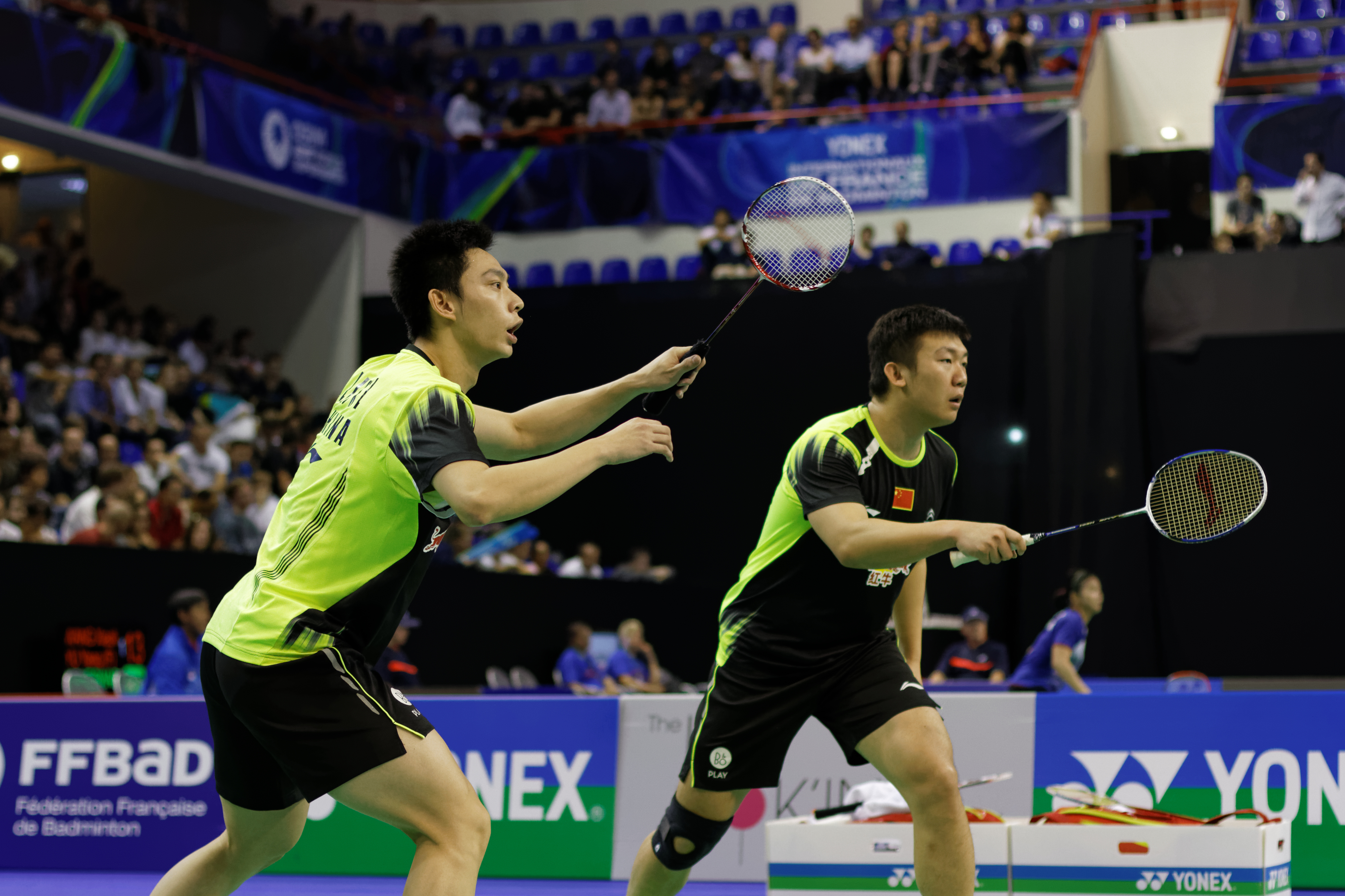
2013 French open. Men's doubles quarterfinal. Liu Xiaolong (left) and Qiu Zihan.

== Achievements ==
=== BWF World Championships ===
Men's doubles
Year	Venue	Partner	Opponent	Score	Result
2015	Istora Senayan, Jakarta, Indonesia	(China) Qiu Zihan	(Indonesia) Mohammad Ahsan (Indonesia) Hendra Setiawan	17–21, 14–21	Silver

=== Asian Championships ===
Men's doubles
Year	Venue	Partner	Opponent	Score	Result
2009	Suwon Indoor Stadium; Suwon, South Korea	(China) Chai Biao	(Indonesia) Markis Kido (Indonesia) Hendra Setiawan	17–21, 15–21	Bronze

=== BWF World Junior Championships ===
Boys' doubles
Year	Venue	Partner	Opponent	Score	Result
2006	Samsan World Gymnasium; Incheon, South Korea	(China) Li Tian	(South Korea) Cho Gun-woo (South Korea) Lee Yong-dae	12–21, 16–21	Silver

Mixed doubles
Year	Venue	Partner	Opponent	Score	Result
2006	Samsan World Gymnasium; Incheon, South Korea	(China) Liao Jingmei	(South Korea) Lee Yong-dae (South Korea) Yoo Hyun-young	14–21, 9–21	Bronze

=== Asian Junior Championships ===
Mixed doubles
Year	Venue	Partner	Opponent	Score	Result
2006	Kuala Lumpur Badminton Stadium; Kuala Lumpur, Malaysia	(China) Liao Jingmei	(South Korea) Lee Yong-dae (South Korea) Yoo Hyun-young	8–21, 12–21	Bronze

=== BWF Superseries ===
The BWF Superseries, which was launched on 14 December 2006 and implemented in 2007, was a series of elite badminton tournaments, sanctioned by the Badminton World Federation (BWF). BWF Superseries levels were Superseries and Superseries Premier. A season of Superseries consisted of twelve tournaments around the world that had been introduced since 2011. Successful players were invited to the Superseries Finals, which were held at the end of each year.

Men's doubles
Year	Tournament	Partner	Opponent	Score	Result
2013	All England Open	(China) Qiu Zihan	(Japan) Hiroyuki Endo (Japan) Kenichi Hayakawa	21–11, 21–9	(gold) Winner
2013	India Open	(China) Qiu Zihan	(South Korea) Ko Sung-hyun (South Korea) Lee Yong-dae	22–20, 21–18	(gold) Winner
2014	India Open	(China) Qiu Zihan	(Denmark) Mathias Boe (Denmark) Carsten Mogensen	21–17, 15–21, 15–21	(silver) Runner-up
2014	Hong Kong Open	(China) Qiu Zihan	(Indonesia) Mohammad Ahsan (Indonesia) Hendra Setiawan	16–21, 21–17, 15–21	(silver) Runner-up

BWF Super Series Finals tournament
BWF Super Series Premier tournament
BWF Super Series tournament

=== BWF Grand Prix ===
The BWF Grand Prix had two levels, the Grand Prix and Grand Prix Gold. It was a series of badminton tournaments sanctioned by the Badminton World Federation (BWF) and played between 2007 and 2017.

Men's doubles
Year	Tournament	Partner	Opponent	Score	Result
2011	Canada Open	(China) Qiu Zihan	(South Korea) Ko Sung-hyun (South Korea) Lee Yong-dae	18–21, 16–21	(silver) Runner-up
2011	Bitburger Open	(China) Qiu Zihan	(Thailand) Bodin Isara (Thailand) Maneepong Jongjit	14–21, 16–21	(silver) Runner-up
2012	Thailand Open	(China) Qiu Zihan	(Malaysia) Mohd Zakry Abdul Latif (Malaysia) Mohd Fairuzizuan Mohd Tazari	21–18, 21–19	(gold) Winner
2013	German Open	(China) Qiu Zihan	(China) Chai Biao (China) Hong Wei	10–21, 14–21	(silver) Runner-up

BWF Grand Prix Gold tournament
BWF Grand Prix tournament
