= Qiu Zihan =

Chinese badminton player (born 1991)

Qiu Zihan 邱子瀚
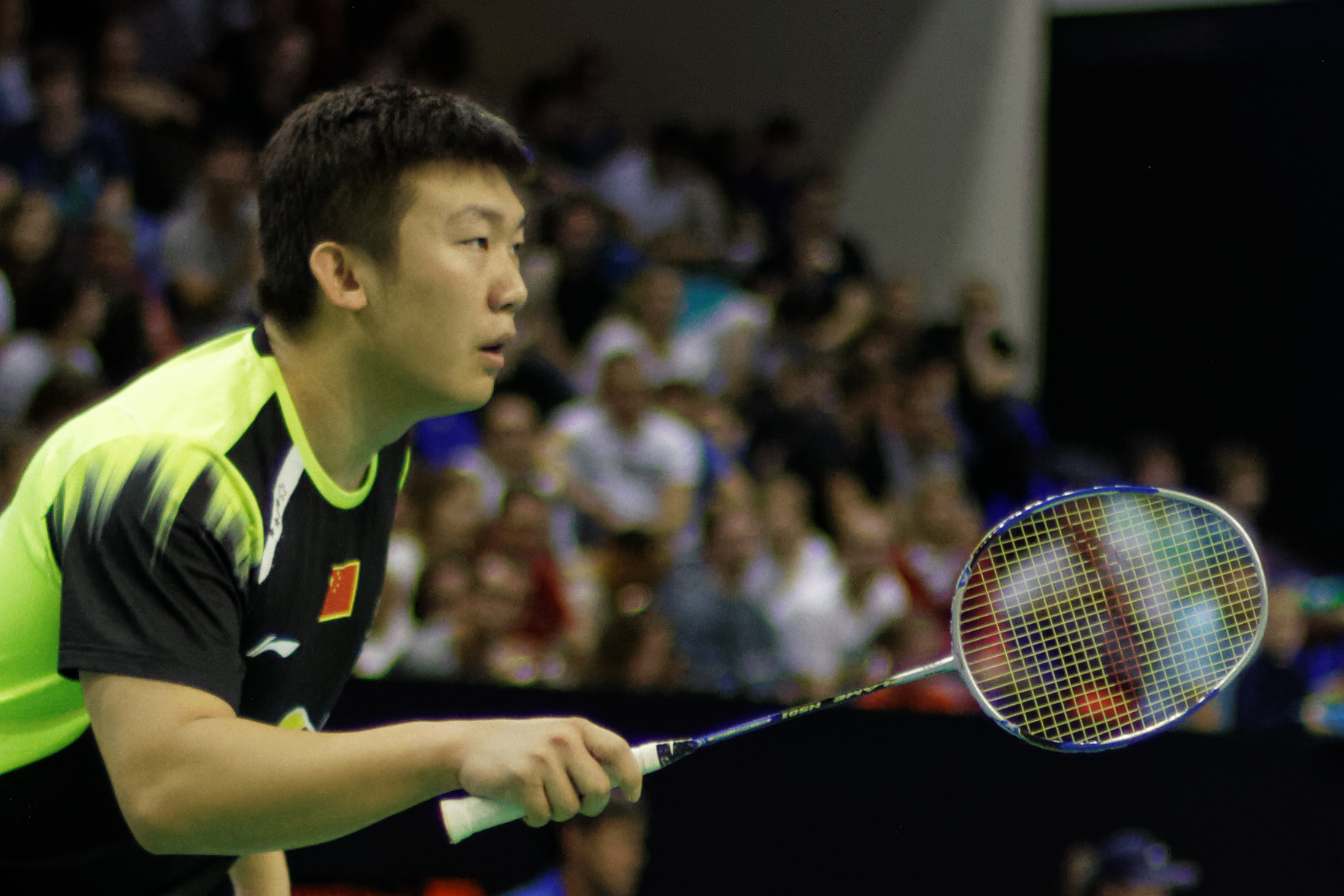

Personal information
- Born: 17 January 1991 (age 35) Jinan, Shandong, China
- Height: 1.83 m (6 ft 0 in)

Sport
- Country: China/Maldives
- Sport: Badminton
- Handedness: Right

Men's & mixed doubles
- Highest ranking: 4 (MD with Liu Xiaolong 26 March 2015); 44 (XD with Bao Yixin 24 October 2013)
- BWF profile
Medal record
Men's badminton
Representing China
World Championships
Silver medal – second place	2015 Jakarta	Men's doubles
Sudirman Cup
Gold medal – first place	2013 Kuala Lumpur	Mixed team
Thomas Cup
Bronze medal – third place	2014 New Delhi	Men's team
Asian Games
Silver medal – second place	2014 Incheon	Men's team
Asian Championships
Bronze medal – third place	2010 New Delhi	Mixed doubles
East Asian Games
Gold medal – first place	2009 Hong Kong	Men's team
Gold medal – first place	2013 Tianjin	Men's team
World Junior Championships
Gold medal – first place	2007 Waitakere City	Mixed team
Gold medal – first place	2008 Pune	Mixed team
Silver medal – second place	2008 Pune	Boys' doubles
Asian Junior Championships
Silver medal – second place	2007 Kuala Lumpur	Mixed team
Bronze medal – third place	2007 Kuala Lumpur	Boys' doubles
Bronze medal – third place	2007 Kuala Lumpur	Mixed doubles

Qiu Zihan (Chinese: 邱子瀚; born 17 January 1991) is a Chinese badminton player who is a doubles specialist. He was part of China winning team at the 2013 Sudirman Cup. Teamed-up with Liu Xiaolong, he won the 2013 All England Open and a silver medal at the 2015 World Championships. He also won the mixed doubles bronze medal at the 2010 Asian Championships partnered with Tian Qing.

== Achievements ==
=== BWF World Championships ===
Men's doubles
Year	Venue	Partner	Opponent	Score	Result
2015	Istora Senayan, Jakarta, Indonesia	(China) Liu Xiaolong	(Indonesia) Mohammad Ahsan (Indonesia) Hendra Setiawan	17–21, 14–21	Silver

=== Asian Championships ===
Mixed doubles
Year	Venue	Partner	Opponent	Score	Result
2010	Siri Fort Indoor Stadium; New Delhi, India	(China) Tian Qing	(South Korea) Yoo Yeon-seong (South Korea) Kim Min-jung	22–24, 21–13, 13–21	Bronze

=== BWF World Junior Championships ===
Boys' doubles
Year	Venue	Partner	Opponent	Score	Result
2008	Shree Shiv Chhatrapati Badminton Hall; Pune, India	(China) Chai Biao	(Malaysia) Mak Hee Chun (Malaysia) Teo Kok Siang	18–21, 14–21	Silver

=== Asian Junior Championships ===
Boys' doubles
Year	Venue	Partner	Opponent	Score	Result
2007	Stadium Juara; Kuala Lumpur, Malaysia	(China) Zhang Nan	(Malaysia) Mohd Lutfi Zaim Abdul Khalid (Malaysia) Tan Wee Kiong	10–21, 13–21	Bronze

Mixed doubles
Year	Venue	Partner	Opponent	Score	Result
2007	Stadium Juara; Kuala Lumpur, Malaysia	(China) Lin Shen	(Malaysia) Tan Wee Kiong (Malaysia) Woon Khe Wei	15–21, 23–21, 15–21	Bronze

=== BWF Superseries ===
The BWF Superseries, which was launched on 14 December 2006 and implemented in 2007, was a series of elite badminton tournaments, sanctioned by the Badminton World Federation (BWF). BWF Superseries levels were Superseries and Superseries Premier. A season of Superseries consisted of twelve tournaments around the world that had been introduced since 2011. Successful players were invited to the Superseries Finals, which were held at the end of each year.

Men's doubles
Year	Tournament	Partner	Opponent	Score	Result
2013	All England Open	(China) Liu Xiaolong	(Japan) Hiroyuki Endo (Japan) Kenichi Hayakawa	21–11, 21–9	(gold) Winner
2013	India Open	(China) Liu Xiaolong	(South Korea) Ko Sung-hyun (South Korea) Lee Yong-dae	22–20, 21–18	(gold) Winner
2014	India Open	(China) Liu Xiaolong	(Denmark) Mathias Boe (Denmark) Carsten Mogensen	21–17, 15–21, 15–21	(silver) Runner-up
2014	Hong Kong Open	(China) Liu Xiaolong	(Indonesia) Mohammad Ahsan (Indonesia) Hendra Setiawan	16–21, 21–17, 15–21	(silver) Runner-up

Mixed doubles
Year	Tournament	Partner	Opponent	Score	Result
2012	China Masters	(China) Tang Jinhua	(China) Xu Chen (China) Ma Jin	21–14, 11–21, 10–21	(silver) Runner-up
2012	French Open	(China) Bao Yixin	(China) Xu Chen (China) Ma Jin	17–21, 21–19, 18–21	(silver) Runner-up

BWF Super Series Finals tournament
BWF Super Series Premier tournament
BWF Super Series tournament

=== BWF Grand Prix ===
The BWF Grand Prix had two levels, the Grand Prix and Grand Prix Gold. It was a series of badminton tournaments sanctioned by the Badminton World Federation (BWF) and played between 2007 and 2017.

Men's doubles
Year	Tournament	Partner	Opponent	Score	Result
2011	Canada Open	(China) Liu Xiaolong	(South Korea) Ko Sung-hyun (South Korea) Lee Yong-dae	18–21, 16–21	(silver) Runner-up
2011	Bitburger Open	(China) Liu Xiaolong	(Thailand) Bodin Isara (Thailand) Maneepong Jongjit	14–21, 16–21	(silver) Runner-up
2012	Thailand Open	(China) Liu Xiaolong	(Malaysia) Mohd Zakry Abdul Latif (Malaysia) Mohd Fairuzizuan Mohd Tazari	21–18, 21–19	(gold) Winner
2013	German Open	(China) Liu Xiaolong	(China) Chai Biao (China) Hong Wei	10–21, 14–21	(silver) Runner-up

BWF Grand Prix Gold tournament
BWF Grand Prix tournament

== Record against selected opponents ==
Men's doubles results with Liu Xiaolong against Super Series finalists, Worlds Semi-finalists, and Olympic quarterfinalists.

- (China) Chai Biao & Guo Zhendong 0–2
- (China) Cai Yun & Fu Haifeng 0–1
- (China) Chai Biao & Hong Wei 0–1
- (China) Fu Haifeng & Zhang Nan 0–2
- (Chinese Taipei) Fang Chieh-min & Lee Sheng-mu 3–3
- (Chinese Taipei) Lee Sheng-mu & Tsai Chia-hsin 1–2
- (Denmark) Mathias Boe & Carsten Mogensen 5–2
- (Denmark) Mads Conrad-Petersen & Jonas Rasmussen 0–1
- (Indonesia) Angga Pratama & Rian Agung Saputro 1–3
- (Indonesia) Mohammad Ahsan & Bona Septano 1–5
- (Indonesia) Mohammad Ahsan & Hendra Setiawan 2–1
- (Indonesia) Marcus Fernaldi Gideon & Markis Kido 2–1
- (Japan) Hirokatsu Hashimoto & Noriyasu Hirata 4–2
- (Japan) Hiroyuki Endo & Kenichi Hayakawa 4–3
- (South Korea) Jung Jae-sung & Lee Yong-dae 0–4
- (South Korea) Ko Sung-hyun & Lee Yong-dae 3–3
- (South Korea) Ko Sung-hyun & Yoo Yeon-seong 0–3
- (South Korea) Lee Yong-dae & Yoo Yeon-seong 0–2
- (Malaysia) Mohd Zakry Abdul Latif & Mohd Fairuzizuan Mohd Tazari 2–0
- (Malaysia) Koo Kien Keat & Tan Boon Heong 0–6
- (Malaysia) Hoon Thien How & Tan Wee Kiong 1–1
- (Malaysia) Goh V Shem & Lim Khim Wah 1–0
- (Thailand) Bodin Isara & Maneepong Jongjit 1–1
