= Kenichi Hayakawa =

Japanese badminton player (born 1986)

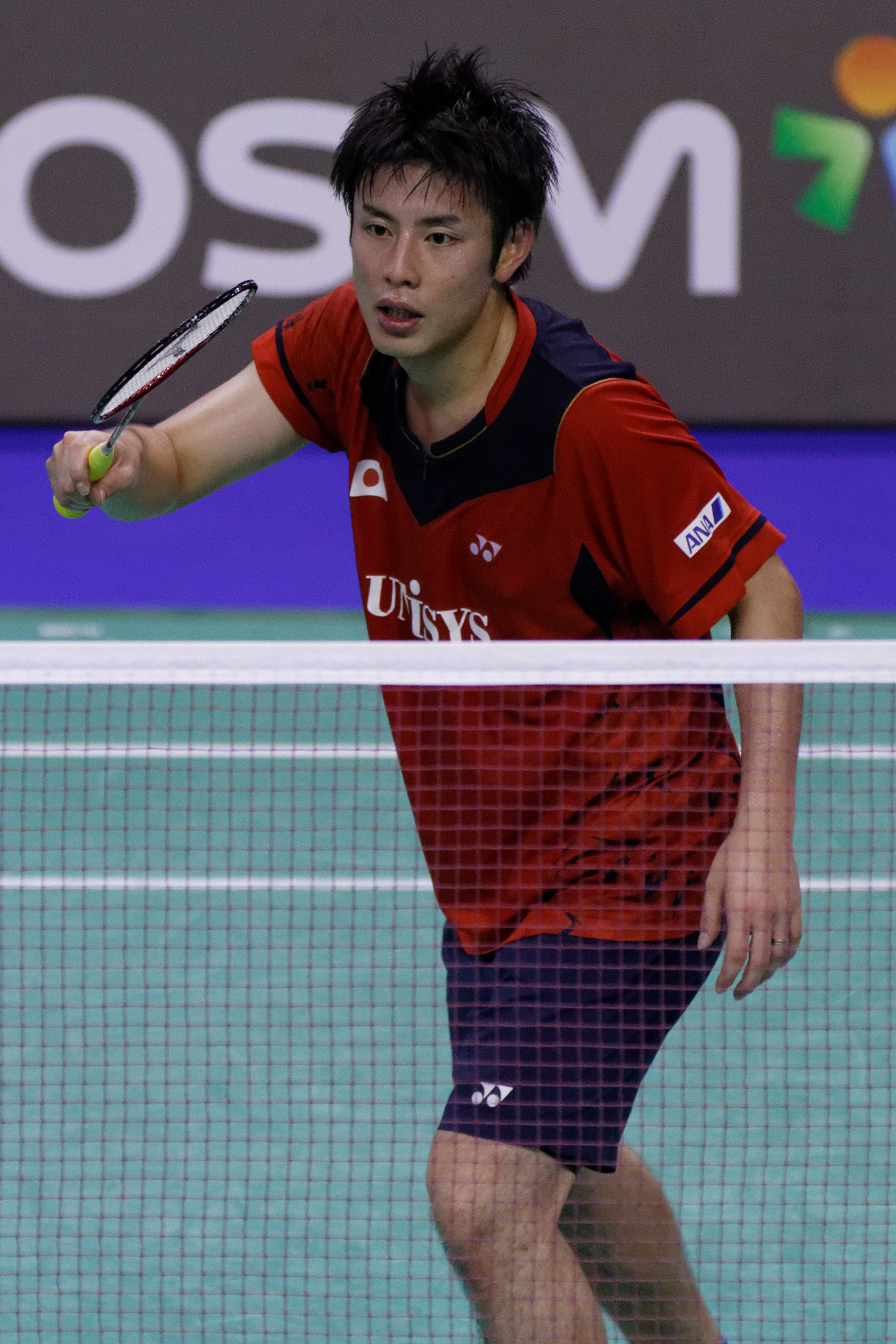
- Kenichi Hayakawa at the 2013 French Super Series.

Personal information
- Born: 5 April 1986 (age 40) Shiga Prefecture, Japan
- Height: 1.77 m (5 ft 10 in)

Sport
- Country: Japan
- Sport: Badminton
- Handedness: Right
- Retired: 31 March 2017

Men's & mixed doubles
- Career record: MD, 256 wins, 151 losses (62.90%); XD, 90 wins, 96 losses (48.39%)
- Highest ranking: 2 (MD with Hiroyuki Endo, 19 June 2014); 12 (XD with Misaki Matsutomo, 19 June 2014)
- BWF profile
Medal record
Men's badminton
Representing Japan
World Championships
Bronze medal – third place	2015 Jakarta	Men's doubles
Sudirman Cup
Silver medal – second place	2015 Dongguan	Mixed team
Thomas Cup
Gold medal – first place	2014 New Delhi	Men's team
Bronze medal – third place	2010 Kuala Lumpur	Men's team
Bronze medal – third place	2012 Wuhan	Men's team
Asian Championships
Silver medal – second place	2012 Qingdao	Men's doubles
Bronze medal – third place	2013 Taipei	Men's doubles
Bronze medal – third place	2015 Wuhan	Mixed doubles
Asia Team Championships
Silver medal – second place	2016 Hyderabad	Men's team
East Asian Games
Bronze medal – third place	2009 Hong Kong	Men's team

Kenichi Hayakawa (早川 賢一, Hayakawa Ken'ichi; born 5 April 1986) is a retired Japanese badminton player. He has been a runner-up of the All England three times (2013, 2014 and 2016) along with his partner, Hiroyuki Endo. He competed at the 2010 and 2014 Asian Games.

== Career ==
Hayakawa won the first point in the 2014 Thomas Cup finals with Hiroyuki Endo beating 2004 World Junior Champions Hoon Thien How and Tan Boon Heong and lead the momentum for the Japanese team to claim the Thomas Cup for the first time, being the fourth nation to win Thomas cup after Indonesia, China and Malaysia.

On 31 March 2017, Hayakawa retired as a badminton player. He was appointed as the Japan national badminton team coach in 2017. Hayakawa stepped down as the national team coach in 2023 and became the men's team manager for BIPROGY.

== Achievements ==
=== World Championships ===
Men's doubles
Year	Venue	Partner	Opponent	Score	Result	Ref.
2015	Istora Senayan; Jakarta, Indonesia	(Japan) Hiroyuki Endo	(China) Liu Xiaolong (China) Qiu Zihan	16–21, 23–21, 20–22	Bronze	

=== Asian Championships ===
Men's doubles
Year	Venue	Partner	Opponent	Score	Result	Ref.
2012	Qingdao Sports Centre Conson Stadium; Qingdao, China	(Japan) Hiroyuki Endo	(South Korea) Kim Gi-jung (South Korea) Kim Sa-rang	12–21, 16–21	Silver	
2013	Taipei Arena; Taipei, Taiwan	(Japan) Hiroyuki Endo	(South Korea) Kim Gi-jung (South Korea) Kim Sa-rang	21–19, 13–21, 14–21	Bronze	

Mixed doubles
Year	Venue	Partner	Opponent	Score	Result	Ref.
2015	Wuhan Sports Center Gymnasium; Wuhan, China	(Japan) Misaki Matsutomo	(Hong Kong) Lee Chun Hei (Hong Kong) Chau Hoi Wah	17–21, 19–21	Bronze	

=== BWF Superseries (7 runners-up) ===
The BWF Superseries, which was launched on 14 December 2006 and implemented in 2007, was a series of elite badminton tournaments, sanctioned by the Badminton World Federation (BWF). BWF Superseries levels were Superseries and Superseries Premier. A season of Superseries consisted of twelve tournaments around the world that had been introduced since 2011. Successful players were invited to the Superseries Finals, which were held at the end of each year.

Men's doubles
Year	Tournament	Partner	Opponent	Score	Result	Ref.
2012	China Masters	(Japan) Hiroyuki Endo	(China) Chai Biao (China) Zhang Nan	18–21, 17–21	(silver) Runner-up	
2012	World Superseries Finals	(Japan) Hiroyuki Endo	(Denmark) Mathias Boe (Denmark) Carsten Mogensen	17–21, 19–21	(silver) Runner-up	
2013	All England Open	(Japan) Hiroyuki Endo	(China) Liu Xiaolong (China) Qiu Zihan	11–21, 9–21	(silver) Runner-up	
2013	China Masters	(Japan) Hiroyuki Endo	(South Korea) Ko Sung-hyun (South Korea) Lee Yong-dae	23–25, 19–21	(silver) Runner-up	
2014	All England Open	(Japan) Hiroyuki Endo	(Indonesia) Mohammad Ahsan (Indonesia) Hendra Setiawan	19–21, 19–21	(silver) Runner-up	
2014	French Open	(Japan) Hiroyuki Endo	(Denmark) Mathias Boe (Denmark) Carsten Mogensen	21–18, 9–21, 7–21	(silver) Runner-up	
2016	All England Open	(Japan) Hiroyuki Endo	(Russia) Vladimir Ivanov (Russia) Ivan Sozonov	23–21, 18–21, 16–21	(silver) Runner-up	

BWF Super Series Finals tournament
BWF Super Series Premier tournament
BWF Super Series tournament

=== BWF Grand Prix (3 titles, 5 runners-up) ===
The BWF Grand Prix had two levels, the Grand Prix and Grand Prix Gold. It was a series of badminton tournaments sanctioned by the Badminton World Federation (BWF) and played between 2007 and 2017.

Men's doubles
Year	Tournament	Partner	Opponent	Score	Result	Ref.
2009	German Open	(Japan) Kenta Kazuno	(South Korea) Lee Yong-dae (South Korea) Shin Baek-cheol	13–21, 16–21	(silver) Runner-up	
2010	Australian Open	(Japan) Hiroyuki Endo	(South Korea) Kang Woo-kyum (South Korea) Park Tae-sang	21–15, 21–16	(gold) Winner	
2011	Australian Open	(Japan) Hiroyuki Endo	(Japan) Naoki Kawamae (Japan) Shoji Sato	21–17, 21–18	(gold) Winner	
2011	Russian Open	(Japan) Hiroyuki Endo	(Japan) Naoki Kawamae (Japan) Shoji Sato	18–21, 17–21	(silver) Runner-up	
2011	Indonesia Grand Prix Gold	(Japan) Hiroyuki Endo	(Indonesia) Mohammad Ahsan (Indonesia) Bona Septano	13–21, 14–21	(silver) Runner-up	
2012	U.S. Open	(Japan) Hiroyuki Endo	(Japan) Yoshiteru Hirobe (Japan) Kenta Kazuno	21–15, 21–10	(gold) Winner	
2014	German Open	(Japan) Hiroyuki Endo	(Japan) Takeshi Kamura (Japan) Keigo Sonoda	19–21, 21–14, 14–21	(silver) Runner-up	

Mixed doubles
Year	Tournament	Partner	Opponent	Score	Result	Ref.
2012	U.S. Open	(Japan) Misaki Matsutomo	(United States) Tony Gunawan (Indonesia) Vita Marissa	13–21, 10–21	(silver) Runner-up	

BWF Grand Prix Gold tournament
BWF Grand Prix tournament

=== BWF International Challenge/Series (3 titles) ===
Men's doubles
Year	Tournament	Partner	Opponent	Score	Result	Ref.
2007	Banuinvest International	(Japan) Kenta Kazuno	(Bulgaria) Julian Hristov (Bulgaria) Konstantin Dobrev	21–10, 21–13	(gold) Winner	
2007	Victorian International	(Japan) Kenta Kazuno	(Australia) Chad Whitehead (Australia) Mark Prior	21–7, 21–15	(gold) Winner	

Mixed doubles
Year	Tournament	Partner	Opponent	Score	Result	Ref.
2010	Osaka International	(Japan) Shizuka Matsuo	(Japan) Hirokatsu Hashimoto (Japan) Mizuki Fujii	21–14, 21–11	(gold) Winner	

BWF International Challenge tournament
BWF International Series tournament
