= 2009 Asian Junior Badminton Championships – Teams event =

Badminton championship in Kuala Lumpur, Malaysia

Teams event at the 2009 Asian Junior Badminton Championships
- Venue: Stadium Juara
- Location: Kuala Lumpur, Malaysia
- Dates: 12–15 July 2009

The team tournament at the 2009 Asian Junior Badminton Championships took place from 12 to 15 July 2009 at Stadium Juara in Kuala Lumpur, Malaysia. A total of 16 countries competed in this event.

== Group stage ==
=== Group A ===
Pos	Team	Pld	W	L	MF	MA	MD	GF	GA	GD	PF	PA	PD	Pts	Qualification	People's Republic of China	Japan	Sri Lanka	Cambodia
1	China	3	3	0	14	1	+13	28	4	+24	664	324	+340	3	Advance to knockout stage	—	4–1	5–0	5–0
2	Japan	3	2	1	11	4	+7	24	8	+16	619	378	+241	2	Advance to knockout stage		—	5–0	5–0
3	Sri Lanka	3	1	2	5	10	−5	10	20	−10	384	520	−136	1				—	5–0
4	Cambodia	3	0	3	0	15	−15	0	30	−30	185	630	−445	0					—

Source: TS

==== China vs Cambodia ====
China
5
Stadium Juara
12 July 2009, 09:00 UTC+8

Cambodia
0

			1	2	3
1	(China) (Cambodia)	Liu Peixuan / Xia Huan; Leng Khlaychhit / Ker Rathanita	21; 5	21; 2
2	(China) (Cambodia)	Tian Houwei; Ngoun Kanora	21; 3	21; 5
3	(China) (Cambodia)	Chen Xiaojia; Ker Rathanisa	21; 5	21; 6
4	(China) (Cambodia)	Guo Junjie / Lu Kai; Chea Senvisoth / Sieng Kimhong	21; 6	21; 4
5	(China) (Cambodia)	Luo Ying / Luo Yu; Ker Rathanisa / Ker Rathanita	21; 1	21; 7

==== Japan vs Sri Lanka ====
Japan
5
Stadium Juara
12 July 2009, 09:00 UTC+8

Sri Lanka
0

			1	2	3
1	(Japan) (Sri Lanka)	Izumi Okoshi / Misato Aratama; Harsha Perera / Mansala Ranawana	21; 16	21; 12
2	(Japan) (Sri Lanka)	Tatsuya Hasegawa; Nuwan Hettiarachchi	21; 13	21; 14
3	(Japan) (Sri Lanka)	Sayaka Takahashi; Lashini Chehera	21; 4	21; 4
4	(Japan) (Sri Lanka)	Naoto Otaki / Tatsuya Watanabe; Nuwan Hettiarachchi / Dilshan Kariyawasam	21; 8	21; 12
5	(Japan) (Sri Lanka)	Kanako Konishi / Ayumi Mine; Lashini Chehera / Mansala Ranawana	21; 4	21; 6

==== China vs Sri Lanka ====
China
5
Stadium Juara
12 July 2009, 16:00 UTC+8

Sri Lanka
0

			1	2	3
1	(China) (Sri Lanka)	Suo Di; Mansala Ranawana	21; 4	21; 2
2	(China) (Sri Lanka)	Li Qi; Harsha Perera	21; 7	21; 18
3	(China) (Sri Lanka)	Li Gen / Lu Kai; Nuwan Hettiarachchi / Dilshan Kariyawasam	21; 15	21; 10
4	(China) (Sri Lanka)	Tang Jinhua / Xia Huan; Lashini Chehera / Mansala Ranawana	21; 3	21; 4
5	(China) (Sri Lanka)	Guo Junjie / Luo Yu; Omesh Fernando / Kavindya Perera	21; 6	21; 12

==== Japan vs Cambodia ====
Japan
5
Stadium Juara
12 July 2009, 16:00 UTC+8

Cambodia
0

			1	2	3
1	(Japan) (Cambodia)	Izumi Okoshi / Misato Aratama; Ngoun Kanora / Ker Rathanisa	21; 5	21; 4
2	(Japan) (Cambodia)	Tatsuya Watanabe; Sieng Kimhong	21; 7	21; 3
3	(Japan) (Cambodia)	Minatsu Mitani; Ker Rathanita	21; 2	21; 2
4	(Japan) (Cambodia)	Shohei Hoshino / Akira Kobayashi; Chea Senvisoth / Leng Khlaychhit	21; 6	21; 6
5	(Japan) (Cambodia)	Naoko Fukuman / Sayaka Takahashi; Ker Rathanisa / Ker Rathanita	21; 3	21; 3

==== China vs Japan ====
China
4
Stadium Juara
13 July 2009, 09:00 UTC+8

Japan
1

			1	2	3
1	(China) (Japan)	Liu Peixuan / Xia Huan; Naoto Otaki / Kanako Konishi	21; 17	21; 8
2	(China) (Japan)	Tian Houwei; Tatsuya Watanabe	21; 19	18; 21	21; 15
3	(China) (Japan)	Chen Xiaojia; Minatsu Mitani	17; 21	21; 12	21; 14
4	(China) (Japan)	Guo Junjie / Lu Kai; Shohei Hoshino / Akira Kobayashi	19; 21	21; 23
5	(China) (Japan)	Tang Jinhua / Xia Huan; Naoko Fukuman / Sayaka Takahashi	22; 20	21; 8

==== Sri Lanka vs Cambodia ====
Sri Lanka
5
Stadium Juara
13 July 2009, 09:00 UTC+8

Cambodia
0

			1	2	3
1	(Sri Lanka) (Cambodia)	Mansala Ranawana; Ker Rathanisa	21; 9	21; 10
2	(Sri Lanka) (Cambodia)	Nuwan Hettiarachchi; Leng Khlaychhit	21; 7	21; 10
3	(Sri Lanka) (Cambodia)	Lashini Chehera / Mansala Ranawana; Ker Rathanisa / Ker Rathanita	21; 18	21; 10
4	(Sri Lanka) (Cambodia)	Nuwan Hettiarachchi / Dilshan Kariyawasam; Chea Senvisoth / Sieng Kimhong	21; 5	21; 11
5	(Sri Lanka) (Cambodia)	Harsha Perera / Lashini Chehera; Ngoun Kanora / Ker Rathanita	21; 11	21; 9

=== Group B ===
Pos	Team	Pld	W	L	MF	MA	MD	GF	GA	GD	PF	PA	PD	Pts	Qualification	Malaysia	India	Vietnam	Mongolia
1	Malaysia (H)	3	3	0	13	2	+11	28	7	+21	700	423	+277	3	Advance to knockout stage	—	4–1	4–1	5–0
2	India	3	2	1	11	4	+7	22	11	+11	616	472	+144	2	Advance to knockout stage		—	5–0	5–0
3	Vietnam	3	1	2	6	9	−3	17	19	−2	646	581	+65	1				—	5–0
4	Mongolia	3	0	3	0	15	−15	0	30	−30	144	630	−486	0					—

Source: TS
(H) Host

==== Malaysia vs Mongolia ====
Malaysia
5
Stadium Juara
12 July 2009, 09:00 UTC+8

Mongolia
0

			1	2	3
1	(Malaysia) (Mongolia)	Goh Jian Hao / Shevon Jemie Lai; Tsolmon Munkhbat / Dulamsuren Munkhbayar	21; 5	21; 1
2	(Malaysia) (Mongolia)	Zulfadli Zulkifli; Enkh-Amgalan Bolorbaatar	21; 2	21; 2
3	(Malaysia) (Mongolia)	Soniia Cheah; Munkhchimeg Mendjargal	21; 1	21; 4
4	(Malaysia) (Mongolia)	Ow Yao Han / Yew Hong Kheng; Enkh-Amgalan Bolorbaatar / Tsolmon Munkhbat	21; 7	21; 3
5	(Malaysia) (Mongolia)	Lai Pei Jing / Ng Hui Ern; Munkhchimeg Mendjargal / Dulamsuren Munkhbayar	21; 4	21; 3

==== India vs Vietnam ====
India
5
Stadium Juara
12 July 2009, 09:00 UTC+8

Vietnam
0

			1	2	3
1	(India) (Vietnam)	B. Sumeeth Reddy; Lê Hà Anh	21; 18	21; 12
2	(India) (Vietnam)	P. C. Thulasi; Nguyễn Thị Sen	21; 16	15; 21	21; 13
3	(India) (Vietnam)	Pranav Chopra / B. Sai Praneeth; Bùi Quang Tuấn / Trần Đức Phong	21; 16	21; 16
4	(India) (Vietnam)	N. Sikki Reddy / P. C. Thulasi; Nguyễn Thị Sen / Vũ Thị Trang	22; 20	19; 21	21; 17
5	(India) (Vietnam)	Pranav Chopra / Prajakta Sawant; Trần Đức Phong / Vũ Thị Trang	21; 17	21; 19

==== Malaysia vs Vietnam ====
Malaysia
4
Stadium Juara
12 July 2009, 16:00 UTC+8

Vietnam
1

			1	2	3
1	(Malaysia) (Vietnam)	Iskandar Zulkarnain Zainuddin; Lê Hà Anh	18; 21	21; 9	21; 16
2	(Malaysia) (Vietnam)	Goh Jian Hao / Shevon Jemie Lai; Bùi Quang Tuấn / Vũ Thị Trang	22; 20	17; 21	8; 21
3	(Malaysia) (Vietnam)	Tee Jing Yi; Nguyễn Thị Sen	21; 8	21; 10
4	(Malaysia) (Vietnam)	Ow Yao Han / Yew Hong Kheng; Lê Hà Anh / Trần Đức Phong	21; 15	15; 21	21; 12
5	(Malaysia) (Vietnam)	Ng Hui Ern / Lai Pei Jing; Nguyễn Thị Sen / Vũ Thị Trang	21; 18	20; 22	21; 16

==== India vs Mongolia ====
India
5
Stadium Juara
12 July 2009, 16:00 UTC+8

Mongolia
0

			1	2	3
1	(India) (Mongolia)	Prannoy H. S. Enkh-Amgalan Bolorbaatar	21; 2	21; 3
2	(India) (Mongolia)	N. Sikki Reddy; Munkhchimeg Mendjargal	21; 4	21; 2
3	(India) (Mongolia)	N. Sikki Reddy / P. C. Thulasi; Munkhchimeg Mendjargal / Dulamsuren Munkhbayar	21; 4	21; 4
4	(India) (Mongolia)	Prannoy H. S. / B. Sumeeth Reddy; Enkh-Amgalan Bolorbaatar / Tsolmon Munkhbat	21; 9	21; 8
5	(India) (Mongolia)	Pranav Chopra / Prajakta Sawant; Tsolmon Munkhbat / Dulamsuren Munkhbayar	21; 4	21; 4

==== Malaysia vs India ====
Malaysia
4
Stadium Juara
13 July 2009, 09:00 UTC+8

India
1

			1	2	3
1	(Malaysia) (India)	Ow Yao Han / Lai Pei Jing; Pranav Chopra / Prajakta Sawant	21; 7	21; 16
2	(Malaysia) (India)	Iskandar Zulkarnain Zainuddin; B. Sumeeth Reddy	21; 5	21; 18
3	(Malaysia) (India)	Tee Jing Yi; N. Sikki Reddy	21; 12	21; 19
4	(Malaysia) (India)	Goh Jian Hao / Pang Zheng Lin; Pranav Chopra / B. Sai Praneeth	21; 12	16; 21	17; 21
5	(Malaysia) (India)	Ng Hui Ern / Lai Pei Jing; N. Sikki Reddy / P. C. Thulasi	21; 16	21; 14

==== Vietnam vs Mongolia ====
Vietnam
5
Stadium Juara
13 July 2009, 09:00 UTC+8

Mongolia
0

			1	2	3
1	(Vietnam) (Mongolia)	Huỳnh Vinh; Tsolmon Munkhbat	21; 2	21; 7
2	(Vietnam) (Mongolia)	Nguyễn Thị Mai Anh; Munkhchimeg Mendjargal	21; 9	21; 5
3	(Vietnam) (Mongolia)	Huỳnh Vinh / Huỳnh Mỹ Lan; Enkh-Amgalan Bolorbaatar / Dulamsuren Munkhbayar	21; 8	21; 4
4	(Vietnam) (Mongolia)	Nguyễn Khắc Tuân / Trần Đức Phong; Enkh-Amgalan Bolorbaatar / Tsolmon Munkhbat	21; 7	21; 9
5	(Vietnam) (Mongolia)	Huỳnh Mỹ Lan / Nguyễn Thị Mai Anh; Munkhchimeg Mendjargal / Dulamsuren Munkhbayar	21; 4	21; 13

=== Group C ===
Pos	Team	Pld	W	L	MF	MA	MD	GF	GA	GD	PF	PA	PD	Pts	Qualification	South Korea	Indonesia	Chinese Taipei for Olympic games	Laos
1	South Korea	3	3	0	12	3	+9	25	8	+17	662	502	+160	3	Advance to knockout stage	—	3–2	4–1	5–0
2	Indonesia	3	2	1	11	4	+7	23	9	+14	656	498	+158	2	Advance to knockout stage		—	4–1	5–0
3	Chinese Taipei	3	1	2	6	9	−3	15	19	−4	613	587	+26	1				—	4–1
4	Laos	3	0	3	1	14	−13	2	29	−27	303	647	−344	0					—

Source: TS

==== South Korea vs Laos ====
South Korea
5
Stadium Juara
12 July 2009, 09:00 UTC+8

Laos
0

			1	2	3
1	(South Korea) (Laos)	Yang Ran-sun; Souchai Xaysana	21; 10	21; 6
2	(South Korea) (Laos)	Kim Min-ki; Phetphanom Keophiachanh	21; 13	21; 6
3	(South Korea) (Laos)	Gu Mu-yeong / Jin Yong-hoon; Phongthanom Ouankhamchanh / Somphone Sysaykeo	21; 15	21; 11
4	(South Korea) (Laos)	Kang Ji-wook / Choi Hye-in; Phonepasith Phengchanseng / Phetmany Keophiachanh	21; 8	21; 10
5	(South Korea) (Laos)	Lee So-hee / Shin Seung-chan; Sisouphanh Vatthanalay / Souchai Xaysana	21; 7	21; 10

==== Indonesia vs Chinese Taipei ====
Indonesia
4
Stadium Juara
12 July 2009, 09:00 UTC+8

Chinese Taipei
1

			1	2	3
1	(Indonesia) (Chinese Taipei)	Ary Trisnanto; Hsu Jen-hao	21; 11	18; 21	21; 16
2	(Indonesia) (Chinese Taipei)	Siti Anida Lestari Quryantin; Hsu Ya-ching	24; 26	17; 21
3	(Indonesia) (Chinese Taipei)	Angga Pratama / Yohanes Rendy Sugiarto; Chang Kai-liang / Lin Yu-te	21; 18	21; 11
4	(Indonesia) (Chinese Taipei)	Suci Rizky Andini / Tiara Rosalia Nuraidah; Tsai Yi-wen / Kuo Yu-wen	21; 16	21; 13
5	(Indonesia) (Chinese Taipei)	Muhammad Ulinnuha / Della Destiara Haris; Lin Chia-hsuan / Tai Tzu-ying	25; 23	21; 19

==== South Korea vs Chinese Taipei ====
South Korea
4
Stadium Juara
12 July 2009, 16:00 UTC+8

Chinese Taipei
1

			1	2	3
1	(South Korea) (Chinese Taipei)	Kang Ji-wook / Choi Hye-in; Lin Chia-hsuan / Tai Tzu-ying	21; 11	21; 17
2	(South Korea) (Chinese Taipei)	Ha Young-woong; Hsu Jen-hao	21; 12	17; 21	14; 21
3	(South Korea) (Chinese Taipei)	Choi Hye-in; Hsu Ya-ching	21; 14	21; 10
4	(South Korea) (Chinese Taipei)	Choi Seung-il / Kang Ji-wook; Chang Kai-liang / Lin Yu-te	21; 18	21; 14
5	(South Korea) (Chinese Taipei)	Lee So-hee / Shin Seung-chan; Kuo Yu-wen / Tai Tzu-ying	13; 21	21; 13	21; 19

==== Indonesia vs Laos ====
Indonesia
5
Stadium Juara
12 July 2009, 16:00 UTC+8

Laos
0

			1	2	3
1	(Indonesia) (Laos)	Febby Angguni; Phetmany Keophiachanh	21; 5	21; 4
2	(Indonesia) (Laos)	Evert Sukamta; Phonepasith Phengchanseng	21; 11	21; 9
3	(Indonesia) (Laos)	Muhammad Ulinnuha / Berry Angriawan; Phetphanom Keophiachanh / Phongthanom Ouankhamchanh	21; 8	21; 11
4	(Indonesia) (Laos)	Della Destiara Haris / Claudia Ayu Wijaya; Phetmany Keophiachanh / Souchai Xaysana	21; 9	21; 12
5	(Indonesia) (Laos)	Kevin Alexander / Suci Rizki Andini; Somphone Sysaykeo / Sisouphanh Vatthanalay	21; 7	21; 8

==== South Korea vs Indonesia ====
South Korea
3
Stadium Juara
13 July 2009, 09:00 UTC+8

Indonesia
2

			1	2	3
1	(South Korea) (Indonesia)	Choi Hye-in; Febby Angguni	21; 18	21; 13
2	(South Korea) (Indonesia)	Choi Seung-il / Kang Ji-wook; Yohanes Rendy Sugiarto / Angga Pratama	16; 21	23; 25
3	(South Korea) (Indonesia)	Kim Min-ki; Ary Trisnanto	21; 23	16; 21
4	(South Korea) (Indonesia)	Lee So-hee / Shin Seung-chan; Suci Rizki Andini / Tiara Rosalia Nuraidah	16; 21	21; 18	22; 20
5	(South Korea) (Indonesia)	Kang Ji-wook / Choi Hye-in; Muhammad Ulinnuha / Della Destiara Haris	21; 17	21; 18

==== Chinese Taipei vs Laos ====
Chinese Taipei
4
Stadium Juara
13 July 2009, 09:00 UTC+8

Laos
1

			1	2	3
1	(Chinese Taipei) (Laos)	Hsu Jen-hao / Yu Li-an; Phongthanom Ouankhamchanh / Souchai Xaysana	21; 14	21; 13
2	(Chinese Taipei) (Laos)	Lin Chia-hsuan; Somphone Sysaykeo	21; 5	21; 6
3	(Chinese Taipei) (Laos)	Tai Tzu-ying; Sisouphanh Vatthanalay	21; 2	21; 3
4	(Chinese Taipei) (Laos)	Chang Kai-liang / Lin Yu-te; Phetphanom Keophiachanh / Phonepasith Phengchanseng	15; 21	27; 25	17; 21
5	(Chinese Taipei) (Laos)	Kuo Yu-wen / Tsai Yi-wen; Phetmany Keophiachanh / Xaysana Souchai	21; 6	21; 7

=== Group D ===
Pos	Team	Pld	W	L	MF	MA	MD	GF	GA	GD	PF	PA	PD	Pts	Qualification	Thailand	Hong Kong	Singapore	Kazakhstan
1	Thailand	3	3	0	14	1	+13	28	3	+25	637	379	+258	3	Advance to knockout stage	—	5–0	4–1	5–0
2	Hong Kong	3	2	1	9	6	+3	19	14	+5	623	509	+114	2	Advance to knockout stage		—	4–1	5–0
3	Singapore	3	1	2	7	8	−1	16	17	−1	557	578	−21	1				—	5–0
4	Kazakhstan	3	0	3	0	15	−15	1	30	−29	294	645	−351	0					—

Source: TS

==== Thailand vs Kazakhstan ====
Thailand
5
Stadium Juara
12 July 2009, 09:00 UTC+8

Kazakhstan
0

			1	2	3
1	(Thailand) (Kazakhstan)	Maneepong Jongjit / Rodjana Chuthabunditkul; Artur Niyazov / Vladlena Kharchenko	21; 9	21; 7
2	(Thailand) (Kazakhstan)	Pisit Poodchalat; Samat Yerzhakanov	21; 8	21; 6
3	(Thailand) (Kazakhstan)	Ratchanok Intanon; Ilyana Filipchuk	21; 5	21; 7
4	(Thailand) (Kazakhstan)	Tin Caballes / Nipitphon Phuangphuapet; Artur Niyazov / Samat Yerzhakanov	21; 7	21; 13
5	(Thailand) (Kazakhstan)	Porntip Buranaprasertsuk / Sapsiree Taerattanachai; Ilyana Filipchuk / Vladlena Kharchenko	21; 6	21; 2

==== Hong Kong vs Singapore ====
Hong Kong
4
Stadium Juara
12 July 2009, 09:00 UTC+8

Singapore
1

			1	2	3
1	(Hong Kong) (Singapore)	Lee Chun Hei / Tse Ying Suet; Jeffrey Wong / Chen Jiayuan	21; 13	19; 21	21; 8
2	(Hong Kong) (Singapore)	Ng Ka Long; Koh Jia Yi	23; 21	21; 19
3	(Hong Kong) (Singapore)	Poon Lok Yan; Chen Jiayuan	15; 21	19; 21
4	(Hong Kong) (Singapore)	Ng Ka Long / Lee Chun Hei; Koh Jia Yi / Jeffrey Wong	21; 16	19; 21	21; 14
5	(Hong Kong) (Singapore)	Poon Lok Yan / Tse Ying Suet; Tan Wei Han / Toh Siew Fen	21; 15	21; 4

==== Hong Kong vs Kazakhstan ====
Hong Kong
5
Stadium Juara
12 July 2009, 16:00 UTC+8

Kazakhstan
0

			1	2	3
1	(Hong Kong) (Kazakhstan)	Ng Ka Long / Tse Ying Suet; Galym Kushumov / Ilyana Filipchuk	21; 11	21; 2
2	(Hong Kong) (Kazakhstan)	Lee Chun Hei; Artur Niyazov	21; 13	21; 13
3	(Hong Kong) (Kazakhstan)	Poon Lok Yan; Vladlena Kharchenko	21; 6	21; 11
4	(Hong Kong) (Kazakhstan)	Chan Dick Long / Chan Tsz Kit; Artur Niyazov / Samat Yerzhakanov	21; 13	21; 12
5	(Hong Kong) (Kazakhstan)	Leung Kin Yan / Yeung Hiu Tung; Ilyana Filipchuk / Vladlena Kharchenko	21; 3	21; 7

==== Thailand vs Singapore ====
Thailand
4
Stadium Juara
12 July 2009, 16:00 UTC+8

Singapore
1

			1	2	3
1	(Thailand) (Singapore)	Maneepong Jongjit / Rodjana Chuthabunditkul; Jeffrey Wong / Noriko Goh	21; 9	21; 13
2	(Thailand) (Singapore)	Pisit Poodchalat; Koh Jia Yi	21; 19	24; 22
3	(Thailand) (Singapore)	Porntip Buranaprasertsuk; Chen Jiayuan	16; 21	16; 21
4	(Thailand) (Singapore)	Rodjana Chuthabunditkul / Sapsiree Taerattanachai; Tan Wei Han / Toh Siew Fen	21; 7	21; 6
5	(Thailand) (Singapore)	Tin Caballes / Nipitphon Phuangphuapet; Gerald Ong / Tang Kirt Soon	21; 12	21; 8

==== Thailand vs Hong Kong ====
Thailand
5
Stadium Juara
13 July 2009, 09:00 UTC+8

Hong Kong
0

			1	2	3
1	(Thailand) (Hong Kong)	Maneepong Jongjit / Rodjana Chuthabunditkul; Lee Chun Hei / Tse Ying Suet	13; 21	21; 14	21; 19
2	(Thailand) (Hong Kong)	Pisit Poodchalat; Ng Ka Long	21; 13	22; 20
3	(Thailand) (Hong Kong)	Ratchanok Intanon; Poon Lok Yan	21; 15	21; 11
4	(Thailand) (Hong Kong)	Nipitphon Phuangphuapet / Tin D. Caballes; Chan Tsz Kit / Chan Dick Long	21; 14	21; 17
5	(Thailand) (Hong Kong)	Porntip Buranaprasertsuk / Sapsiree Taerattanachai; Poon Lok Yan / Tse Ying Suet	21; 16	21; 11

==== Singapore vs Kazakhstan ====
Singapore
5
Stadium Juara
13 July 2009, 09:00 UTC+8

Kazakhstan
0

			1	2	3
1	(Singapore) (Kazakhstan)	Tang Kirt Soon / Toh Siew Fen; Samat Yerzhakanov / Ilyana Filipchuk	21; 16	21; 15
2	(Singapore) (Kazakhstan)	Gerald Ong; Artur Niyazov	15; 21	21; 9	21; 11
3	(Singapore) (Kazakhstan)	Tan Wei Han; Vladlena Kharchenko	21; 9	21; 9
4	(Singapore) (Kazakhstan)	Koh Jia Yi / Jeffrey Wong; Artur Niyazov / Samat Yerzhakanov	21; 14	21; 15
5	(Singapore) (Kazakhstan)	Chen Jiayuan / Noriko Goh; Vladlena Kharchenko / Ilyana Filipchuk	21; 10	21; 4

== Knockout stage ==
=== Bracket ===
Quarter-finals
13 July
China	3
Indonesia	0
13 July
Thailand	3
India	1
13 July
Japan	3
South Korea	1
13 July
Hong Kong	0
Malaysia	3

Semi-finals
14 July
China	3
Thailand	1
14 July
Japan	1
Malaysia	3

Final
15 July
China	1
Malaysia	3

=== Quarter-finals ===
==== China vs Indonesia ====
China
3
Stadium Juara
13 July 2009, 16:00 UTC+8

Indonesia
0

			1	2	3
1	(China) (Indonesia)	Lu Kai / Bao Yixin; Muhammad Ulinnuha / Della Destiara Haris	21; 14	21; 15
2	(China) (Indonesia)	Tian Houwei; Evert Sukamta	21; 19	21; 14
3	(China) (Indonesia)	Chen Xiaojia; Siti Anida Lestari Quryantin	16; 21	21; 12	21; 14
4	(China) (Indonesia)	Guo Junjie / Liu Peixuan; Angga Pratama / Yohanes Rendy Sugiarto				not played
5	(China) (Indonesia)	Tang Jinhua / Xia Huan; Suci Rizki Andini / Tiara Rosalia Nuraidah				not played

==== Thailand vs India ====
Thailand
3
Stadium Juara
13 July 2009, 16:00 UTC+8

India
1

			1	2	3
1	(Thailand) (India)	Pisit Poodchalat; Prannoy H. S.	21; 10	24; 22
2	(Thailand) (India)	Ratchanok Intanon; N. Sikki Reddy	21; 14	22; 24	22; 20
3	(Thailand) (India)	Tin Caballes / Nipitphon Phuangphuapet; Pranav Chopra / B. Sai Praneeth	13; 21	17; 21
4	(Thailand) (India)	Porntip Buranaprasertsuk / Sapsiree Taerattanachai; N. Sikki Reddy / P. C. Thulasi	21; 12	21; 15
5	(Thailand) (India)	Maneepong Jongjit / Rodjana Chuthabunditkul; Pranav Chopra / Prajakta Sawant				not played

==== Japan vs South Korea ====
Japan
3
Stadium Juara
13 July 2009, 16:00 UTC+8

South Korea
1

			1	2	3
1	(Japan) (South Korea)	Naoto Otaki / Kanako Konishi; Kang Ji-wook / Choi Hye-in	12; 21	16; 21
2	(Japan) (South Korea)	Tatsuya Watanabe; Kim Min-ki	21; 10	21; 13
3	(Japan) (South Korea)	Minatsu Mitani; Choi Hye-in	21; 19	21; 15
4	(Japan) (South Korea)	Shohei Hoshino / Akira Kobayashi; Choi Seung-il / Kang Ji-wook	21; 18	21; 18
5	(Japan) (South Korea)	Kanako Konishi / Sayaka Takahashi; Lee So-hee / Shin Seung-chan				not played

==== Hong Kong vs Malaysia ====
Hong Kong
0
Stadium Juara
13 July 2009, 16:00 UTC+8

Malaysia
3

			1	2	3
1	(Hong Kong) (Malaysia)	Lee Chun Hei / Tse Ying Suet; Ow Yao Han / Lai Pei Jing	16; 21	15; 21
2	(Hong Kong) (Malaysia)	Ng Ka Long; Iskandar Zulkarnain Zainuddin	18; 21	11; 21
3	(Hong Kong) (Malaysia)	Poon Lok Yan; Tee Jing Yi	17; 21	15; 21
4	(Hong Kong) (Malaysia)	Ng Ka Long / Lee Chun Hei; Goh Jian Hao / Pang Zheng Lin				not played
5	(Hong Kong) (Malaysia)	Poon Lok Yan / Tse Ying Suet; Lai Pei Jing / Ng Hui Ern				not played

=== Semi-finals ===
==== China vs Thailand ====
China
3
Stadium Juara
14 July 2009, 09:00 UTC+8

Thailand
1

			1	2	3
1	(China) (Thailand)	Lu Kai / Bao Yixin; Maneepong Jongjit / Chuthabunditkul Rodjana	21; 13	21; 11
2	(China) (Thailand)	Tian Houwei; Pisit Poodchalat	16; 21	14; 21
3	(China) (Thailand)	Chen Xiaojia; Ratchanok Intanon	21; 16	24; 22
4	(China) (Thailand)	Guo Junjie / Liu Peixuan; Tin Caballes / Nipitphon Phuangphuapet	21; 13	18; 21	21; 13
5	(China) (Thailand)	Tang Jinhua / Xia Huan; Porntip Buranaprasertsuk / Sapsiree Taerattanachai				not played

==== Japan vs Malaysia ====
Japan
1
Stadium Juara
14 July 2009, 09:00 UTC+8

Malaysia
3

			1	2	3
1	(Japan) (Malaysia)	Naoto Otaki / Kanako Konishi; Ow Yao Han / Lai Pei Jing	17; 21	13; 21
2	(Japan) (Malaysia)	Tatsuya Watanabe; Iskandar Zulkarnain Zainuddin	9; 21	14; 21
3	(Japan) (Malaysia)	Minatsu Mitani; Tee Jing Yi	21; 17	12; 21	21; 17
4	(Japan) (Malaysia)	Shohei Hoshino / Akira Kobayashi; Goh Jian Hao / Pang Zheng Lin	19; 21	21; 16	19; 21
5	(Japan) (Malaysia)	Kanako Konishi / Sayaka Takahashi; Ng Hui Ern / Lai Pei Jing				not played

=== Final ===
==== China vs Malaysia ====
China
1
Stadium Juara
15 July 2009, 09:00 UTC+8

Malaysia
3

			1	2	3
1	(China) (Malaysia)	Lu Kai / Bao Yixin; Ow Yao Han / Lai Pei Jing	21; 17	21; 10
2	(China) (Malaysia)	Tian Houwei; Iskandar Zulkarnain Zainuddin	17; 21	16; 21
3	(China) (Malaysia)	Chen Xiaojia; Tee Jing Yi	19; 21	21; 12	17; 21
4	(China) (Malaysia)	Guo Junjie / Liu Peixuan; Goh Jian Hao / Pang Zheng Lin	16; 21	20; 22
5	(China) (Malaysia)	Tang Jinhua / Xia Huan; Lai Pei Jing / Ng Hui Ern				not played
