= 2011 China Masters Super Series =

Tournament details
- Dates: September 13, 2011 - September 18, 2011
- Total prize money: US$200,000
- Location: Changzhou, China

The 2011 China Masters Super Series was the seventh super series tournament of the 2011 BWF Super Series. The tournament was held in Changzhou, China from September 13–18, 2011 and had a total purse of $200,000.

== Men's singles ==
=== Seeds ===
1. (China) Lin Dan
2. (Denmark) Peter Gade
3. (China) Chen Long
4. (China) Chen Jin
5. (China) Du Pengyu
6. (Japan) Sho Sasaki
7. (China) Bao Chunlai
8. (South Korea) Lee Hyun-il

=== Top half ===
First Round
1 | (China) Lin D | 21 | 21
(Chinese Taipei) Hsu J-h | 15 | 13
(Malaysia) M H Hashim | 22 | 21
(Japan) T Ueda | 20 | 17
6 | (Japan) S Sasaki | 21 | 21
PFQ | (Malaysia) M A A Latif | 19 | 12
(Japan) K Yamada | 21 | 21
Q3 | (China) Lü Y | 17 | 8
4 | (China) Chen J | 21 | 11 | 21
(Malaysia) Chong W F | 4 | 21 | 10
(South Korea) Shon W-h | 16 | 10
Q2 | (China) Zhou WL | 21 | 21
PFQ | (India) G Datt R.M.V. | 19 | 13
(Denmark) H-K Vittinghus | 21 | 21
(Thailand) T Saensomboonsuk | 21 | 21
(Chinese Taipei) Chou T-c | 16 | 17

Second Round
1 | (China) Lin D | 14 | 12 | 21
(Malaysia) M H Hashim | 21 | 18 | 9
6 | (Japan) S Sasaki | 21 | 21
(Japan) K Yamada | 13 | 16
4 | (China) Chen J | 21 | 21
Q3 | (China) Zhou WL | 15 | 13
(Denmark) H-K Vittinghus | 13 | 21 | 21
(Thailand) T Saensomboonsuk | 21 | 18 | 18

Quarterfinals
1 | (China) Lin D | 21 | 21
6 | (Japan) S Sasaki | 15 | 6
4 | (China) Chen J | 21 | 21
(Denmark) H-K Vittinghus | 16 | 19

Semifinals
1 | (China) Lin D | 23 | 15
4 | (China) Chen J | 25 | 21

=== Bottom half ===
First Round
(Hong Kong) Chan Y K | 21 | 21
(India) A Pawar | 17 | 18
(Hong Kong) Wong W K | 13 | 21 | 11
8 | (South Korea) Lee H-i | 21 | 19 | 21
(Denmark) J Ø. Jørgensen | 11 | 21
(Chinese Taipei) Hsueh H-y | 21 | 23
(Germany) M Zwiebler | 7 | 13
3 | (China) Chen L | 21 | 21
(China) Wang ZM | 21 | 21
(Japan) K Tago | 14 | 14
(Malaysia) Liew DR | 11 | 14
5 | (China) Du PY | 21 | 21
(India) K Parupalli | 19 | 21 | 21
(England) R Ouseph | 21 | 16 | 11
Q1 | (China) Chen YK | 17 | 21 | 7
2 | (Denmark) P Gade | 21 | 12 | 21

Second Round
(Hong Kong) Chan Y K | 6 | 17
8 | (South Korea) Lee H-i | 21 | 21
(Chinese Taipei) Hsueh H-y | 16 | 12
3 | (China) Chen L | 21 | 21
(China) Wang ZM | 11 | 17
5 | (China) Du PY | 21 | 21
(India) K Parupalli | 18 | 15
2 | (Denmark) P Gade | 21 | 21

Quarterfinals
8 | (South Korea) Lee H-i | 10 | 20
3 | (China) Chen L | 21 | 22
5 | (China) Du PY | 21 | 14 | 16
2 | (Denmark) P Gade | 17 | 21 | 21

Semifinals
3 | (China) Chen L | 21 | 21
2 | (Denmark) P Gade | 18 | 14

=== Finals ===
Semifinals
1 | (China) Lin Dan | 23 | 15
4 | (China) Chen Jin | 25 | 21
3 | (China) Chen Long | 21 | 21
2 | (Denmark) Peter Gade | 18 | 14

Final
4 | (China) Chen Jin | 16 | 20
3 | (China) Chen Long | 21 | 22

== Women's singles ==
=== Seeds ===
1. (China) Wang Yihan
2. (China) Wang Shixian
3. (China) Wang Xin
4. (China) Jiang Yanjiao
5. (India) Saina Nehwal
6. (Denmark) Tine Baun
7. (China) Liu Xin
8. (Chinese Taipei) Cheng Shao-chieh

=== Top half ===
First Round
1 | (China) Wang YH | 21 | 21
(South Korea) Sung J-h | 15 | 10
(China) Li XR | 11 | 22 | 18
(Singapore) Gu J | 21 | 20 | 21
5 | (India) S Nehwal | 21 | 21
Q | (India) A Mutatkar | 6 | 8
(Japan) A Kurihara | 21 | 21
(Malaysia) Tee J Y | 15 | 17
4 | (China) Jiang YJ | 21 | 21
(Netherlands) Yao J | 14 | 14
(Bulgaria) P Nedelcheva | 16 | 19
(Japan) S Sato | 21 | 21
7 | (China) Liu X | 21 | 21
(France) Pi HY | 9 | 16
(Japan) M Mitani | 20 | 21 | 17
Q | (China) Yao X | 22 | 18 | 21

Second Round
1 | (China) Wang YH | 21 | 21
(Singapore) Gu J | 15 | 12
5 | (India) S Nehwal | 21 | 18 | 27
(Japan) A Kurihara | 11 | 21 | 25
4 | (China) Jiang YJ | 22 | 21
(Japan) S Sato | 20 | 7
7 | (China) Liu X | 21 | 21
Q | (China) Yao X | 16 | 16

Quarterfinals
1 | (China) Wang YH | 21 | 21
5 | (India) S Nehwal | 8 | 12
4 | (China) Jiang YJ | 21 | 21
7 | (China) Liu X | 12 | 13

Semifinals
1 | (China) Wang YH | 15 | 15
4 | (China) Jiang YJ | 21 | 21

=== Bottom half ===
First Round
PFQ | (Singapore) Xing AY | 14 | 21 | 23
PFQ | (China) Chen XJ | 21 | 15 | 21
(South Korea) Kim M-h | 10 | 13
6 | (Denmark) T Baun | 21 | 21
(Japan) E Hirose | 19 | 21 | 21
(South Korea) Bae Y-j | 21 | 14 | 11
Q | (India) A Pantawane | 13 | 10
3 | (China) Wang X | 21 | 21
(Japan) K Imabeppu | 13 | 21 | 14
(Germany) J Schenk | 21 | 19 | 21
Q | (India) P. C. Thulasi | 14 | 8
8 | (Chinese Taipei) Cheng S-c | 21 | 21
(Singapore) Fu MT | 14 | 21 | 21
(Chinese Taipei) Pai H-m | 21 | 13 | 19
(Chinese Taipei) Tai T-y | 13 | 21 | 29
2 | (China) Wang SX | 21 | 19 | 30

Second Round
PFQ | (Singapore) Xing AY | 14 | 15
6 | (Denmark) T Baun | 21 | 21
(Japan) E Hirose | 12 | 20
3 | (China) Wang X | 21 | 22
(Germany) J Schenk | 20 | 21 | 21
8 | (Chinese Taipei) Cheng S-c | 22 | 18 | 11
(Singapore) Fu MT | 15 | 12
2 | (China) Wang SX | 21 | 21

Quarterfinals
6 | (Denmark) T Baun | 16 | 13
3 | (China) Wang X | 21 | 21
(Germany) J Schenk | 16 | 12
2 | (China) Wang SX | 21 | 21

Semifinals
3 | (China) Wang X | 12 | 18
2 | (China) Wang SX | 21 | 21

=== Finals ===
Semifinals
1 | (China) Wang Yihan | 15 | 15
4 | (China) Jiang Yanjiao | 21 | 21
3 | (China) Wang Xin | 12 | 18
2 | (China) Wang Shixian | 21 | 21

Final
4 | (China) Jiang Yanjiao | 16 | 5 | R
2 | (China) Wang Shixian | 21 | 8

== Men's doubles ==
=== Seeds ===
1. (China) Cai Yun / Fu Haifeng
2. (Denmark) Mathias Boe / Carsten Mogensen
3. (South Korea) Jung Jae-sung / Lee Yong-dae
4. (South Korea) Ko Sung-hyun / Yoo Yeon-seong
5. (Malaysia) Koo Kien Keat / Tan Boon Heong
6. (Indonesia) Mohammad Ahsan / Bona Septano
7. (Indonesia) Markis Kido / Hendra Setiawan
8. (Indonesia) Alvent Yulianto Chandra / Hendra Aprida Gunawan

=== Top half ===
First Round
(Japan) N Kawamae (Japan) S Sato | w | / | o
(South Korea) Kim K-j (South Korea) Shin B-c
8 | (Indonesia) A Y Chandra (Indonesia) H A Gunawan | 20 | 13
(Japan) H Hashimoto (Japan) N Hirata | 22 | 21
(Japan) Y Hirobe (Japan) K Kazuno | 19 | 21 | 18
(England) C Adcock (England) A Ellis | 21 | 19 | 21
(India) R Kumar K.T. (India) S Thomas | 21 | 21
(Netherlands) R Bosch (Netherlands) K Ridder | 18 | 11
7 | (Indonesia) M Kido (Indonesia) H Setiawan | 21 | 21
(Chinese Taipei) Fang C-m (Chinese Taipei) Lee S-m | 16 | 13
(Chinese Taipei) Liao M-c (Chinese Taipei) Wu C-w | 12 | 18
(China) Hong W (China) Shen Y | 21 | 21

Second Round
1 | (China) Cai Y (China) Fu HF | 15 | 21 | 21
(South Korea) Kim K-j (South Korea) Shin B-c | 21 | 19 | 19
(Japan) H Hashimoto (Japan) N Hirata | 20 | 8
(England) C Adcock (England) A Ellis | 22 | 21
4 | (South Korea) Ko S-h (South Korea) Yoo Y-s | 21 | 21
(India) R Kumar K.T. (India) S Thomas | 13 | 9
7 | (Indonesia) M Kido (Indonesia) H Setiawan | 21 | 16 | 11
(China) Hong W (China) Shen Y | 19 | 21 | 21

Quarterfinals
1 | (China) Cai Y (China) Fu HF | 21 | 21
(England) C Adcock (England) A Ellis | 18 | 14
4 | (South Korea) Ko S-h (South Korea) Yoo Y-s | 22 | 21
(China) Hong W (China) Shen Y | 20 | 16

Semifinals
1 | (China) Cai Y (China) Fu HF | 26 | 21
4 | (South Korea) Ko S-h (South Korea) Yoo Y-s | 24 | 18

=== Bottom half ===
First Round
(Malaysia) Chan P S (Malaysia) Ong J G | 21 | 9 | 20
(Chinese Taipei) Chen H-l (Chinese Taipei) Lin Y-l | 17 | 21 | 22
(China) Chai B (China) Guo ZD | 18 | 18
5 | (Malaysia) Koo K K (Malaysia) Tan B H | 21 | 21
(Denmark) M Conrad-Petersen (Denmark) J Rasmussen | 16 | 21 | 18
(China) Tao JM (China) Zhang N | 21 | 15 | 21
(Germany) I Kindervater (Germany) J Schöttler | 8 | 16
3 | (South Korea) Jung J-s (South Korea) Lee Y-d | 21 | 21
(Japan) H Endo (Japan) K Hayakawa | 21 | 21
(Indonesia) A Pratama (Indonesia) R A Saputro | 15 | 15
(China) Liu XL (China) Qiu ZH | 15 | 10
6 | (Indonesia) M Ahsan (Indonesia) B Septano | 21 | 21
(Denmark) R Bonde (Denmark) A Kristiansen | 12 | 15
(South Korea) Cho G-w (South Korea) Kwon Y-g | 21 | 21

Second Round
(Chinese Taipei) Chen H-l (Chinese Taipei) Lin Y-l | 14 | 21 | 17
5 | (Malaysia) Koo K K (Malaysia) Tan B H | 21 | 9 | 21
(China) Tao JM (China) Zhang N | 13 | 8
3 | (South Korea) Jung J-s (South Korea) Lee Y-d | 21 | 21
(Japan) H Endo (Japan) K Hayakawa | 16 | 18
6 | (Indonesia) M Ahsan (Indonesia) B Septano | 21 | 21
(South Korea) Cho G-w (South Korea) Kwon Y-g | 15 | 24
2 | (Denmark) M Boe (Denmark) C Mogensen | 21 | 26

Quarterfinals
5 | (Malaysia) Koo K K (Malaysia) Tan B H | 21 | 16 | 13
3 | (South Korea) Jung J-s (South Korea) Lee Y-d | 15 | 21 | 21
6 | (Indonesia) M Ahsan (Indonesia) B Septano | 20 | 21
2 | (Denmark) M Boe (Denmark) C Mogensen | 22 | 23

Semifinals
3 | (South Korea) Jung J-s (South Korea) Lee Y-d | 21 | 16 | 21
2 | (Denmark) M Boe (Denmark) C Mogensen | 18 | 21 | 17

=== Finals ===
Semifinals
1 | (China) Cai Yun (China) Fu Haifeng | 26 | 21
4 | (South Korea) Ko Sung-hyun (South Korea) Yoo Yeon-seong | 24 | 18
3 | (South Korea) Jung Jae-sung (South Korea) Lee Yong-dae | 21 | 16 | 21
2 | (Denmark) Mathias Boe (Denmark) Carsten Mogensen | 18 | 21 | 17

Final
1 | (China) Cai Yun (China) Fu Haifeng | 17 | 10
3 | (South Korea) Jung Jae-sung (South Korea) Lee Yong-dae | 21 | 21

== Women's doubles ==
=== Seeds ===
1. (China) Wang Xiaoli / Yu Yang
2. (Japan) Miyuki Maeda / Satoko Suetsuna
3. (Japan) Mizuki Fujii / Reika Kakiiwa
4. (China) Tian Qing / Zhao Yunlei
5. (Chinese Taipei) Cheng Wen-hsing / Chien Yu-chin
6. (Japan) Shizuka Matsuo / Mami Naito
7. (South Korea) Ha Jung-eun / Kim Min-jung
8. (China) Cheng Shu / Pan Pan

=== Top half ===
First Round
(Chinese Taipei) Hsieh P-c (Chinese Taipei) Wang P-r | 12 | 16
(South Korea) Jung K-e (South Korea) Kim H-n | 21 | 21
(Denmark) C Pedersen (Denmark) K Rytter Juhl | 18 | 21 | 21
(Malaysia) Chin E H (Malaysia) Wong P T | 21 | 12 | 19
(China) Bao YX (China) Zhong QZ | 19 | 21 | 21
(Japan) M Matsutomo (Japan) A Takahashi | 21 | 16 | 17

Second Round
1 | (China) Wang XL (China) Yu Y | 21 | 21
(Malaysia) Chong S C (Malaysia) Goh L Y | 17 | 9
7 | (South Korea) Ha J-e (South Korea) Kim M-j | 10^{r}
(South Korea) Jung K-e (South Korea) Kim H-n | 7
4 | (China) Tian Q (China) Zhao YL | 21 | 15 | 21
(Denmark) C Pedersen (Denmark) K Rytter Juhl | 9 | 21 | 13
6 | (Japan) S Matsuo (Japan) M Naito | 19 | 12
(China) Bao YX (China) Zhong QX | 21 | 21

Quarterfinals
1 | (China) Wang XL (China) Yu Y | 21 | 21
(South Korea) Jung K-e (South Korea) Kim H-n | 10 | 17
4 | (China) Tian Q (China) Zhao YL | 21 | 21
(China) Bao YX (China) Zhong QX | 10 | 14

Semifinals
1 | (China) Wang XL (China) Yu Y | 24 | 18 | 21
4 | (China) Tian Q (China) Zhao YL | 22 | 21 | 19

=== Bottom half ===
First Round
(Singapore) Fu MT (Singapore) Xing AY | 13 | 15
(Malaysia) Hoo V K M (Malaysia) Woon K W | 21 | 21
(Indonesia) V Marissa (Indonesia) N Melati | 19 | 21 | 21
(England) J Wallwork (England) G White | 21 | 18 | 11
(Malaysia) Ng H E (Malaysia) Ng H L | 22 | 19 | 21
(South Korea) Eom H-w (South Korea) Jang Y-n | 20 | 21 | 19
(China) Xia H (China) Tang JH | 21 | 15 | 23
(India) J Gutta (India) A Ponnappa | 19 | 21 | 21

Second Round
(Malaysia) Hoo V K M (Malaysia) Woon K W | 16 | 15
5 | (Chinese Taipei) Cheng W-h (Chinese Taipei) Chien Y-c | 21 | 21
(Indonesia) V Marissa (Indonesia) N Melati | 20 | 14
3 | (Japan) M Fujii (Japan) R Kakiiwa | 22 | 21
(Malaysia) Ng H E (Malaysia) Ng H L | 10 | 16
8 | (China) Cheng S (China) Pan P | 21 | 21
(China) Xia H (China) Tang Jh | 21 | 12 | 21
2 | (Japan) M Maeda (Japan) S Suetsuna | 18 | 21 | 19

Quarterfinals
5 | (Chinese Taipei) Cheng W-h (Chinese Taipei) Chien Y-c | 18 | 16
3 | (Japan) M Fujii (Japan) R Kakiiwa | 21 | 21
8 | (China) Cheng S (China) Pan P | 21 | 5 | 12
(China) Xia H (China) Tang JH | 19 | 21 | 21

Semifinals
3 | (Japan) M Fujii (Japan) R Kakiiwa | 10 | 18
(China) Xia H (China) Tang JH | 21 | 21

=== Finals ===
Semifinals
1 | (China) Wang Xiaoli (China) Yu Yang | 24 | 18 | 21
4 | (China) Tian Qing (China) Zhao Yunlei | 22 | 21 | 19
3 | (Japan) Mizuki Fujii (Japan) Reika Kakiiwa | 10 | 18
(China) Huan Xia (China) Tang Jinhua | 21 | 21

Final
1 | (China) Wang Xiaoli (China) Yu Yang | 19 | R
(China) Huan Xia (China) Tang Jinhua | 21

== Mixed doubles ==
=== Seeds ===
1. (China) Zhang Nan / Zhao Yunlei
2. (China) Tao Jiaming / Tian Qing
3. (Denmark) Joachim Fischer Nielsen / Christinna Pedersen
4. (Chinese Taipei) Chen Hung-ling / Cheng Wen-hsing
5. (China) Xu Chen / Ma Jin
6. (England) Nathan Robertson / Jenny Wallwork
7. (Poland) Robert Mateusiak / Nadiezda Zieba
8. (Denmark) Thomas Laybourn / Kamilla Rytter Juhl

=== Top half ===
First Round
1 | (China) Zhang N (China) Zhao YL | 21 | 21
(Chinese Taipei) Lin Y-l (Chinese Taipei) Hsieh P-c | 14 | 12
(South Korea) Ko S-h (South Korea) Eom H-w | 21 | 19 | 21
(Japan) H Hashimoto (Japan) M Fujii | 8 | 21 | 15
5 | (China) Xu C (China) Ma J | 21 | 21
(Japan) S Sato (Japan) S Matsuo | 14 | 10
(Indonesia) I Fadhilah (Indonesia) W Anggraini | 21 | 19 | 18
(Japan) K Kazuno (Japan) A Takahashi | 16 | 21 | 21
3 | (Denmark) J F Nielsen (Denmark) C Pedersen | 21 | 21
(Chinese Taipei) Lee S-m (Chinese Taipei) Chien Y-c | 15 | 16
(Indonesia) N Widianto (Indonesia) V Marissa | 21 | 21
(Malaysia) Ong J G (Malaysia) Chong S C | 14 | 16
8 | (Denmark) T Laybourn (Denmark) K Rytter Juhl | 21 | 21
(Indonesia) M R Delynugraha (Indonesia) P R Dili | 12 | 13
(China) Hong W (China) Pan P | 21 | 14 | 21
(Japan) K Hayakawa (Japan) M Matsutomo | 15 | 21 | 15

Second Round
1 | (China) Zhang N (China) Zhao YL | 21 | 21
(South Korea) Ko S-h (South Korea) Eom Hye-won | 18 | 14
5 | (China) Xu C (China) Ma J | 21 | 21
(Japan) K Kazuno (Japan) A Takahashi | 9 | 13
3 | (Denmark) J F Nielsen (Denmark) C Pedersen | 21 | 24
(Indonesia) N Widianto (Indonesia) V Marissa | 9 | 22
8 | (Denmark) T Laybourn (Denmark) K Rytter Juhl | 13 | 21 | 21
(China) Hong W (China) Pan P | 21 | 18 | 18

Quarterfinals
1 | (China) Zhang N (China) Zhao YL | 21 | 1^{r}
5 | (China) Xu C (China) Ma J | 18 | 1
3 | (Denmark) J F Nielsen (Denmark) C Pedersen | 21 | 21
8 | (Denmark) T Laybourn (Denmark) K Rytter Juhl | 15 | 16

Semifinals
1 | (China) Xu C (China) Ma J | 21 | 22
3 | (Denmark) J F Nielsen (Denmark) C Pedersen | 15 | 20

=== Bottom half ===
First Round
(South Korea) Yoo Y-s (South Korea) Jang Y-n | 21 | 17 | 21
(China) Qiu ZH (China) Huan X | 17 | 21 | 16
(Malaysia) Chan P S (Malaysia) Goh L Y | 21 | 7 | 21
7 | (Poland) R Mateusiak (Poland) N Zieba | 19 | 21 | 17
(Japan) N Hirata (Japan) M Maeda | 19 | 16
(England) C Adcock (Scotland) I Bankier | 21 | 21
(Japan) S Ikeda (Japan) R Shiota | 21 | 13 | 14
4 | (Chinese Taipei) Chen H-l (Chinese Taipei) Cheng W-h | 19 | 21 | 21
(Scotland) R Blair (England) G White | 21 | 21
(South Korea) Shin B-c (South Korea) Kim H-n | 20 | 18
(South Korea) Kim K-j (South Korea) Jung K-e | 21 | 21
6 | (England) N Robertson (England) J Wallwork | 17 | 17
(South Korea) Lee Y-d (South Korea) Ha J-e | 22 | 21
(China) He HB (China) Bao YX | 20 | 15
(India) Diju V. (India) J Gutta | 5 | 21 | 21
2 | (China) Tao JM (China) Tian Q | 21 | 14 | 18

Second Round
(South Korea) Yoo Y-s (South Korea) Jang Y-n | 16 | 21 | 22
(Malaysia) Chan P S (Malaysia) Goh L Y | 21 | 10 | 20
(England) C Adcock (Scotland) I Bankier | 21 | 21
4 | (Chinese Taipei) Chen H-l (Chinese Taipei) Cheng W-h | 18 | 19
(Scotland) R Blair (England) G White | 21 | 21
(South Korea) Kim K-j (South Korea) Jung K-e | 13 | 12
(South Korea) Lee Y-d (South Korea) Ha J-e | 19 | 17
(India) Diju V. (India) J Gutta | 21 | 21

Quarterfinals
(South Korea) Yoo Y-s (South Korea) Jang Y-n | 19 | 21 | 21
(England) C Adcock (Scotland) I Bankier | 21 | 15 | 16
(Scotland) R Blair (England) G White | 21 | 19 | 9
(India) Diju V. (India) J Gutta | 17 | 21 | 21

Semifinals
(South Korea) Yoo Y-s (South Korea) Jang Y-n | 6 | 21 | 21
(India) Diju V. (India) J Gutta | 21 | 19 | 19

=== Finals ===
Semifinals
1 | (China) Xu Chen (China) Ma Jin | 21 | 22
3 | (Denmark) Joachim Fischer Nielsen (Denmark) Christinna Pedersen | 15 | 20
(South Korea) Yoo Yeon-seong (South Korea) Jang Ye-na | 6 | 21 | 21
(India) Diju V. (India) Jwala Gutta | 21 | 19 | 19

Final
1 | (China) Xu Chen (China) Ma Jin | 21 | 21
(South Korea) Yoo Yeon-seong (South Korea) Jang Ye-na | 13 | 16

| Preceded by 2010 China Masters Super Series | China Masters | Succeeded by 2012 China Masters Super Series |
| Preceded by 2011 Indonesia Super Series Premier | BWF Super Series; 2011 season | Succeeded by 2011 Japan Super Series |
