= 2009 BWF World Junior Championships – mixed doubles =

Tournament details
- Dates: 28 October 2009 – 1 November 2009
- Edition: 20th
- Level: International
- Venue: Sultan Abdul Halim Stadium
- Location: Alor Setar, Malaysia

The mixed doubles event for 2009 BWF World Junior Championships was held on 28 October–1 November 2009. Maneepong Jongjit and Rodjana Chuthabunditkul became the first Thai players along with Ratchanok Intanon in girls' singles event to win the world junior championships.

== Seeds ==
1. Lu Kai / Bao Yixin (semi-final)
2. Liu Peixuan / Xia Huan (semi-final)
3. Maneepong Jongjit / Rodjana Chuthabunditkul (champion)
4. Jacco Arends / Selena Piek (fourth round)
5. Ng Ka Long / Tse Ying Suet (third round)
6. Niclas Nohr / Lena Grebak (second round)
7. Kevin Alexander / Suci Rizki Andini (fourth round)
8. Pranav Chopra / Prajakta Sawant (fourth round)
9. Mark Middleton / Alyssa Lim (second round)
10. Akira Kobayashi / Naoko Fukuman (fourth round)
11. Ow Yao Han / Lai Pei Jing (quarter-final)
12. Tan Wee Tat / Lai Shevon Jemie (third round)
13. Nipitphon Puangpuapech / Artima Serithammarak (quarter-final)
14. Clinton Liu / May-Lee Lindeman (second round)
15. Andreas Heinz / Fabienne Deprez (second round)
16. Max Schwenger / Isabel Herttrich (third round)

== Draw ==
=== Finals ===
Quarterfinals
1 | Lu Kai; Bao Yixin | 21 | 17 | 21
9/16 | Ow Yao Han; Lai Pei Jing | 11 | 21 | 8
9/16 | Nipitphon Puangpuapech; Artima Serithammarak | 17 | 13
Angga Pratama; Della Destiara Haris | 21 | 21
Tran Duc Phong; Vu Thi Trang | 16 | 13
3/4 | Maneepong Jongjit; Rodjana Chuthabunditkul | 21 | 21
Yang Chih-Hsun; Wu Yun-Ting | 16 | 16
2 | Liu Peixuan; Xia Huan | 21 | 21

Semifinals
1 | Lu Kai; Bao Yixin | 19 | 18
Angga Pratama; Della Destiara Haris | 21 | 21
3/4 | Maneepong Jongjit; Rodjana Chuthabunditkul | 21 | 21
2 | Liu Peixuan; Xia Huan | 19 | 10

Final
Angga Pratama; Della Destiara Haris | 19 | 21 | 17
3/4 | Maneepong Jongjit; Rodjana Chuthabunditkul | 21 | 14 | 21

=== Top half ===
==== Section 1 ====
First round
Le HA; Pham NT | 21 | 19 | 19
S Bergstrom; C Fere | 16 | 21 | 21
L Claerbout; L Meheust | 11 | 12
Guo JJ; Luo Y | 21 | 21

Second round
1 | Lu K Bao YX | 21 | 21
A Niyazov; V Kharchenko | 3 | 6
N Persson; I Wienefeld | 16 | 16
S Bergstrom; C Fere | 21 | 2
9/16 | M Schwenger; I Herttrich | 21 | 23
T Caballes; T Ampunsuwan | 10 | 21
D Kariyawasam; S Illangakoon | 5 | 9
Guo JJ; Luo Y | 21 | 21

Third round
1 | Lu K Bao YX | 21 | 21
S Bergstrom; C Fere | 6 | 3
9/16 | M Schwenger; I Herttrich | wo
Guo JJ; Luo Y

Fourth round
1 | Lu K Bao YX
Guo JJ; Luo Y | wo

==== Section 2 ====
First round
Li G Tang JH | 21 | 21
Hsu J-H; Wu T-J | 19 | 19
S Kimhong; K Rathanisa | wo
D Balandin; E Komendrovskaya
N Lee; S Kadam | 21 | 10 | 21
M Nottingham; L Smith | 7 | 21 | 18

Second round
5/8 | P Chopra; P Sawant | 21 | 21
J Donaldson; K Dejak | 8 | 9
B Chu; V Na | 12 | 14
Li G Tang JH | 21 | 21
9/16 | Ow YH; Lai PJ | 21 | 21
Tang KS; N Goh | 11 | 12
D Balandin; E Komendrovskaya | 21 | 19 | 21
N Lee; S Kadam | 15 | 21 | 17

Third round
5/8 | P Chopra; P Sawant | 21 | 18 | 21
Li G Tang JH | 12 | 21 | 17
9/16 | Ow YH; Lai PJ | 21 | 21
D Balandin; E Komendrovskaya | 11 | 12

Fourth round
5/8 | P Chopra; P Sawant | 13 | 13
9/16 | Ow YH; Lai PJ | 21 | 21

==== Section 3 ====
First round
F Quach; L Kjaersfeldt | 21 | 21
E Hung; T Pilven | 12 | 14
N Otaki; K Konishi | 21 | 22
J Wong; Thng TT | 18 | 20

Second round
3/4 | J Arends; S Piek | 21 | 21
H Perera; S Weerasinghe | 18 | 18
A Gobinathan; L Ma | 11 | 15
F Quach; L Kjaersfeldt | 21 | 21
9/16 | N Puangpuapech; A Serithammarak | 21 | 21
A Richardson; S Leydon-Davis | 10 | 18
F Gauthier; M Maunoury | 18 | 19
N Otaki; K Konishi | 21 | 21

Third round
3/4 | J Arends; S Piek | 17 | 21 | 21
F Quach; L Kjaersfeldt | 21 | 15 | 14
9/16 | N Puangpuapech; A Serithammarak | 21 | 21
N Otaki; K Konishi | 16 | 13

Fourth round
3/4 | J Arends; S Piek | 21 | 18 | 19
9/16 | N Puangpuapech; A Serithammarak | 17 | 21 | 21

==== Section 4 ====
First round
A Pratama; D Haris | 21 | 21
L Charlesworth; M O'Connor | 19 | 12
H Takeuchi; M Takagi | 21 | 21
D Oud; M Stapleton | 15 | 14
Ngo YC; Toh SF | 14 | 11
B Angriawan; N Wijaya | 21 | 21

Second round
5/8 | Ng KL; Tse YS | 21 | 21
P Vivas; M Alcala | 16 | 18
A de Assis; Fong SC | 10 | 11
A Pratama; D Haris | 21 | 21
9/16 | M Middleton; A Lim | 22 | 18 | 20
K Astrup; S Thygesen | 20 | 21 | 22
H Takeuchi; M Takagi | 13 | 23 | 21
B Angriawan; N Wijaya | 21 | 21 | 16

Third round
5/8 | Ng KL; Tse YS | 19 | 6
A Pratama; D Haris | 21 | 21
K Astrup; S Thygesen | 21 | 21
H Takeuchi; M Takagi | 19 | 18

Fourth round
A Pratama; D Haris | 22 | 21
K Astrup; S Thygesen | 20 | 13

=== Bottom half ===
==== Section 5 ====
First round
Tran DP; Vu TT
C Senvisoth; S Sovanpich | wo
V Vattanirappel; A Mathis | 21 | 21
Lei MF; A de Assis | 12 | 9
P Escueta; G Castelo | 21 | 21
O Fernando; O Kuruppu | 8 | 4

Second round
Tran DP; Vu TT | 21 | 21
V Vattanirappel; A Mathis | 8 | 13
P Kaemnitz; A Hammes | 21 | 21
9/16 | C Liu; M Lindeman | 13 | 15
P Escueta; G Castelo | 21 | 21
Lin Y-T; Shuai P-L | 17 | 16
A Yartsev; N Perminova | 17 | 20
5/8 | K Alexander; S Andini | 21 | 22

Third round
Tran DP; Vu TT | 21 | 21
P Kaemnitz; A Hammes | 11 | 15
P Escueta; G Castelo | 14 | 21
5/8 | K Alexander; S Andini | 21 | 23

Fourth round
Tran DP; Vu TT | 19 | 21 | 23
5/8 | K Alexander; S Andini | 21 | 19 | 21

==== Section 6 ====
First round
Lee CH; Poon LY | 17 | 21 | 21
P Lundvist; A Wallin | 21 | 17 | 16
Chooi KM; Ng HE | 21 | 21
Lam CL; Ieong PS | 8 | 4

Second round
Lee CH; Poon LY | 21 | 21
Tam CH; Yeung YK | 17 | 18
Yew HK; Ong BH | 14 | 21 | 23
9/16 | A Heinz; F Deprez | 21 | 18 | 21
Chooi KM; Ng HE | 21 | 21
Chang K-L; Kao H | 11 | 13
C Coles; J Fletcher | 15 | 22 | 14
3/4 | M Jongjit; R Chuthabunditkul | 21 | 20 | 21

Third round
Lee CH; Poon LY | 21 | 19 | 21
Yew HK; Ong BH | 16 | 21 | 19
Chooi KM; Ng HE | 21 | 19 | 9
3/4 | M Jongjit; R Chuthabunditkul | 11 | 21 | 21

Fourth round
Lee CH; Poon LY | 11 | 8
3/4 | M Jongjit; R Chuthabunditkul | 21 | 21

==== Section 7 ====
First round
N Kidambi; M Ninan | 21 | 21
T Lam; C Beauregard | 13 | 4
N Hettiarachchi; A Rathnasiri | 17 | 15
T Watanabe; M Aratama | 21 | 21
L Khlaychchit; V Rany | wo
P Talayan; M Chan

Second round
N Kidambi; M Ninan | 13 | 8
T Watanabe; M Aratama | 21 | 21
M Baumann; A Fontaine | 15 | 10
9/16 | Tan WT; Lai SJ | 21 | 21
P Talayan; M Chan | 8 | 14
Yang C-H; Wu Y-T | 21 | 21
M Ulinnuha; T Nuraidah | 21 | 19 | 21
5/8 | N Nohr; L Grebak | 16 | 21 | 17

Third round
T Watanabe; M Aratama | 21 | 21
9/16 | Tan WT; Lai SJ | 19 | 11
Yang C-H; Wu Y-T | 21 | 16 | 21
M Ulinnuha; T Nuraidah | 17 | 21 | 18

Fourth round
T Watanabe; M Aratama | 12 | 21 | 7
Yang C-H; Wu Y-T | 21 | 18 | 21

==== Section 8 ====
First round
Bui QT; Nguyen TMA | 21 | 21
L Zevl; L Havlova | 19 | 16
K Abramov; A Nazarchuk | 21 | 21
Cheang WL; Iao MH | 9 | 13

Second round
Bui QT; Nguyen TMA | 17 | 19
Koh JY; Tan WH | 21 | 21
Chan DL; Leung KY | 14 | 13
9/16 | A Kobayashi; N Fukuman | 21 | 21
K Abramov; A Nazarchuk | 21 | 15 | 21
N David; L Choo | 15 | 21 | 13
H Oruc; R Kurtulus | 12 | 11
2 | Liu PX; Xia H | 21 | 21

Third round
Koh JY; Tan WH | 21 | 19 | 16
9/16 | A Kobayashi; N Fukuman | 18 | 21 | 21
K Abramov; A Nazarchuk | 15 | 21 | 15
2 | Liu PX; Xia H | 21 | 15 | 21

Fourth round
9/16 | A Kobayashi; N Fukuman | 14 | 7
2 | Liu PX; Xia H | 21 | 21
