= 2009 BWF World Junior Championships – Girls' doubles =

2009 BWF World Junior Championships Girls' doubles
Tournament details
- Dates: 28 October 2009 – 1 November 2009
- Edition: 20th
- Level: International
- Venue: Sultan Abdul Halim Stadium
- Location: Alor Setar, Malaysia

The girls' doubles of the tournament 2009 BWF World Junior Championships was held on 28 October–1 November 2009. The Chinese pair of Tang Jinhua and Xia Huan took out the girls' doubles final defeating Indonesian pair, Suci Rizki Andini and Tiara Rosalia Nuraidah in three sets.

== Seeds ==
1. (China) Tang Jinhua / Xia Huan (champion)
2. (China) Bao Yixin / Luo Yu (quarter-final)
3. (Hong Kong) Poon Lok Yan / Tse Ying Suet (semi-final)
4. (Thailand) Rodjana Chuthabunditkul / Sapsiree Taerattanachai (semi-final)
5. (Vietnam) Nguyen Thi Sen / Vu Thi Trang (quarter-final)
6. (Malaysia) Lai Pei Jing / Ng Hui Ern (quarter-final)
7. (Russia) Anastasia Chervaykova / Natalia Perminova (second round)
8. (Netherlands) Selena Piek / Iris Tabeling (second round)

== Draw ==
=== Finals ===
Semifinals
1 | (China) Tang Jinhua (China) Xia Huan | 21 | 21
3/4 | (Thailand) Rodjana Chuthabunditkul (Thailand) Sapsiree Taerattanachai | 7 | 15
3/4 | (Hong Kong) Poon Lok Yan (Hong Kong) Tse Ying Suet | 21 | 9 | 18
(Indonesia) Suci Rizki Andini (Indonesia) Tiara Rosalia Nuraidah | 18 | 21 | 21

Final
1 | (China) Tang Jinhua (China) Xia Huan | 21 | 21
(Indonesia) Suci Rizki Andini (Indonesia) Tiara Rosalia Nuraidah | 9 | 18

=== Top-half ===
==== Section 1 ====
First round
(Vietnam) Le TH (Vietnam) Pham NT | 21 | 21
(Canada) C Beauregard (Canada) S Kadam | 16 | 15
(Australia) L Choo (Australia) V Na | 17 | 17
(Sri Lanka) A Rathnasiri (Sri Lanka) S Weerasinghe | 21 | 21
(Macau) A de Assis (Macau) Ieong PS | 12 | 17
(Turkey) C Fere (Turkey) E Gokal | 21 | 21

Second round
1 | (China) Tang JH (China) Xia H | 21 | 21
(New Zealand) M O'Connor (New Zealand) M Stapleton | 6 | 7
(Germany) I Herttrich (Germany) I Wienefeld | 21 | 21
(Vietnam) Le TH (Vietnam) Pham NT | 19 | 17
5/8 | (Netherlands) S Piek (Netherlands) I Tabeling | 0^{r}
(Chinese Taipei) Shuai P-L (Chinese Taipei) Wu T-J | 2
(Sri Lanka) A Rathnasiri (Sri Lanka) S Weerasinghe | 21 | 21
(Turkey) C Fere (Turkey) E Gokal | 10 | 8

Third round
1 | (China) Tang JH (China) Xia H | 21 | 21
(Germany) I Herttrich (Germany) I Wienefeld | 7 | 15
(Chinese Taipei) Shuai P-L (Chinese Taipei) Wu T-J | 21 | 21
(Sri Lanka) A Rathnasiri (Sri Lanka) S Weerasinghe | 14 | 12

Quarter Final
1 | (China) Tang JH (China) Xia H | 21 | 21
(Chinese Taipei) Shuai P-L (Chinese Taipei) Wu T-J | 11 | 7

==== Section 2 ====
First round
(Hong Kong) Leung KY (Hong Kong) Yeung YK | 12 | 21
(England) A Langley (England) L Smith | 21 | 23
(Japan) M Aratama (Japan) M Mitani | 21 | 21
(Russia) E Komendrovskaya (Russia) A Nazarchuk | 10 | 13
(Denmark) S Jensen (Denmark) L Kjaersfeldt | 13 | 13
(Indonesia) N Wijaya (Indonesia) D Haris | 21 | 21

Second round
3/4 | (Thailand) R Chuthabunditkul (Thailand) S Taerattanachai | 21 | 21
(Philippines) M Alcala (Philippines) G Castelo | 10 | 8
(India) P Thulasi (India) S Reddy | 16 | 21 | 21
(England) A Langley (England) L Smith | 21 | 19 | 17
5/8 | (Malaysia) Lai PJ (Malaysia) Ng HE | 21 | 21
(Singapore) Tan WH (Singapore) Toh SF | 12 | 6
(Japan) M Aratama (Japan) M Mitani | 15 | 17
(Indonesia) N Wijaya (Indonesia) D Haris | 21 | 21

Third round
3/4 | (Thailand) R Chuthabunditkul (Thailand) S Taerattanachai | 21 | 14 | 21
(India) P Thulasi (India) S Reddy | 11 | 21 | 18
5/8 | (Malaysia) Lai PJ (Malaysia) Ng HE | 22 | 22
(Indonesia) N Wijaya (Indonesia) D Haris | 20 | 20

Quarter Final
3/4 | (Thailand) R Chuthabunditkul (Thailand) S Taerattanachai | 24 | 20 | 21
5/8 | (Malaysia) Lai PJ (Malaysia) Ng HE | 22 | 22 | 14

=== Bottom half ===
==== Section 3 ====
First round
(Malaysia) Lai SJ (Malaysia) Ong BH | 22 | 21
(Sri Lanka) S Illangakoon (Sri Lanka) O Kuruppu | 20 | 14
(Austria) A Mathis (France) M Maunoury | 21 | 21
(France) A Fontaine (France) L Meheust | 13 | 18
(India) M Ninan (India) P Sawant | 21 | 17 | 21
(England) J Fletcher (England) S Milne | 15 | 21 | 12

Second round
(Malaysia) Lai SJ (Malaysia) Ong BH | 21 | 21
(Austria) A Mathis (France) M Maunoury | 17 | 13
(Australia) L Ma (Australia) T Pilven | 5 | 13
5/8 | (Vietnam) Nguyen TS (Vietnam) Vu TT | 21 | 21
(India) M Ninan (India) P Sawant
(Germany) A Hammes (Germany) L Heidenreich | wo
(Thailand) T Ampunsuwan (Thailand) C Chalardchaleam | 12 | 21 | 18
3/4 | (Hong Kong) Pon LY (Hong Kong) Tse YS | 21 | 17 | 21

Third round
(Malaysia) Lai SJ (Malaysia) Ong BH | 15 | 10
5/8 | (Vietnam) Nguyen TS (Vietnam) Vu TT | 21 | 21
(India) M Ninan (India) P Sawant | 10 | 12
3/4 | (Hong Kong) Pon LY (Hong Kong) Tse YS | 21 | 21

Quarter Final
5/8 | (Vietnam) Nguyen TS (Vietnam) Vu TT | 15 | 16
3/4 | (Hong Kong) Pon LY (Hong Kong) Tse YS | 21 | 21

==== Section 4 ====
First round
(Denmark) L Grebak (Denmark) S Thygesen | 21 | 21
(Turkey) O Bayrak (Turkey) R Kurtulus | 10 | 13
(Cambodia) K Rathanisa (Cambodia) V Rany | wo
(New Zealand) M Chan (New Zealand) V Cheng
(Chinese Taipei) Kao H (Chinese Taipei) Wu Y-T | 11 | 21 | 10
(Japan) N Fukuman (Japan) S Takahashi | 21 | 17 | 21

Second round
(Denmark) L Grebak (Denmark) S Thygesen | 21 | 21
(New Zealand) M Chan (New Zealand) V Cheng | 12 | 10
(Indonesia) S Andini (Indonesia) T Nuraidah | 21 | 21
5/8 | (Russia) A Chervaykova (Russia) N Perminova | 9 | 14
(Japan) N Fukuman (Japan) S Takahashi | 21 | 21
(Macau) Fong SC (Macau) Iao MH | 9 | 5
(Canada) K Dejak (Canada) M Li | 11 | 10
2 | (China) Bao YX (China) Luo Y | 21 | 21

Third round
(Denmark) L Grebak (Denmark) S Thygesen | 14 | 21 | 17
(Indonesia) S Andini (Indonesia) T Nuraidah | 21 | 17 | 21
(Japan) N Fukuman (Japan) S Takahashi | 21 | 23 | 19
2 | (China) Bao YX (China) Luo Y | 18 | 25 | 21

Quarter Final
(Indonesia) S Andini (Indonesia) T Nuraidah | 21 | 21
2 | (China) Bao YX (China) Luo Y | 18 | 19
