= Iskandar Zulkarnain Zainuddin =

Malaysian badminton player

Iskandar Zulkarnain
Personal information
- Nickname: Iskandar
- Born: Iskandar Zulkarnain bin Zainuddin; 24 May 1991 (age 35) Kuala Lumpur, Malaysia
- Years active: 2010–present
- Height: 1.75 m (5 ft 9 in)
- Weight: 64 kg (141 lb)

Sport
- Country: Malaysia
- Sport: Badminton
- Handedness: Right

Men's singles
- Highest ranking: 23 (24 November 2016)
- BWF profile
Medal record
Men's badminton
Representing Malaysia
Thomas Cup
Bronze medal – third place	2016 Kunshan	Men's team
Asian Games
Bronze medal – third place	2014 Incheon	Men's team
Asia Team Championships
Bronze medal – third place	2018 Alor Setar	Men's team
SEA Games
Silver medal – second place	2017 Kuala Lumpur	Men's team
Bronze medal – third place	2015 Singapore	Men's team
Summer Universiade
Bronze medal – third place	2013 Kazan	Men's singles
World Junior Championships
Silver medal – second place	2009 Alor Setar	Mixed team
Silver medal – second place	2009 Alor Setar	Boys' singles
Bronze medal – third place	2008 Pune	Mixed team
Asian Junior Championships
Gold medal – first place	2009 Kuala Lumpur	Mixed team
Silver medal – second place	2009 Kuala Lumpur	Boys' singles
Bronze medal – third place	2008 Kuala Lumpur	Mixed team

Iskandar Zulkarnain bin Zainuddin (born 24 May 1991) is a Malaysian badminton player and coach. He represented Malaysia as the third singles in the 2018 Thomas Cup and helped Malaysia qualify for the quarter finals.

Iskandar was appointed as part of the Irish badminton coaching staff in 2021. Iskandar had gone back to Malaysia after the appointment, but returned to coach in Ireland later in 2022.

== Achievements ==
=== Summer Universiade ===
Men's singles
Year	Venue	Opponent	Score	Result
2013	Tennis Academy; Kazan, Russia	(Thailand) Tanongsak Saensomboonsuk	9–21, 11–21	Bronze

=== World Junior Championships ===
Boys' singles
Year	Venue	Opponent	Score	Result
2009	Stadium Sultan Abdul Halim; Alor Setar, Malaysia	(China) Tian Houwei	12–21, 17–21	Silver

=== Asian Junior Championships ===
Boys' singles
Year	Venue	Opponent	Score	Result
2009	Stadium Juara; Kuala Lumpur, Malaysia	(China) Tian Houwei	11–21, 18–21	Silver

=== BWF Grand Prix ===
The BWF Grand Prix has two levels, the BWF Grand Prix and Grand Prix Gold. It is a series of badminton tournaments sanctioned by the Badminton World Federation (BWF) since 2007.

Men's singles
Year	Tournament	Opponent	Score	Result
2016	Malaysia Masters	(Malaysia) Lee Chong Wei	18–21, 11–21	(silver) Runner-up

BWF Grand Prix Gold tournament
BWF Grand Prix tournament

=== BWF International Challenge/Series ===
Men's singles
Year	Tournament	Opponent	Score	Result
2010	Smiling Fish International	(India) Ajay Jayaram	10–21, 4–21	(silver) Runner-up
2015	Austrian International	(Hong Kong) Ng Ka Long	21–14, 18–21, 19–21	(silver) Runner-up
2015	Singapore International	(Malaysia) Soo Teck Zhi	21–11, 21–15	(gold) Winner
2015	Polish International	(Denmark) Anders Antonsen	21–12, 21–18	(gold) Winner
2015	Swiss International	(Finland) Ville Lång	21–19, 16–21, 21–11	(gold) Winner
2017	Malaysia International	(Malaysia) Leong Jun Hao	21–11, 21–13	(gold) Winner
2019	White Nights	(India) Siddharth Pratap Singh	21–13, 21–16	(gold) Winner

Men's doubles
Year	Tournament	Partner	Opponent	Score	Result
2010	Smiling Fish International	(Malaysia) Muhammad Syawal Mohd Ismail	(Thailand) Patiphat Chalardchalaem (Thailand) Thitipong Lapho	17–21, 21–19, 21–14	(gold) Winner

BWF International Challenge tournament
BWF International Series tournament
