= Rodjana Chuthabunditkul =

Thai badminton player (born 1991)

Personal information
- Born: 14 August 1991 (age 35)

Sport
- Country: Thailand
- Sport: Badminton
- Handedness: Right

Women's & mixed doubles
- Highest ranking: 60 (WD) 6 June 2013; 69 (XD) 24 October 2013
- BWF profile
Medal record
Badminton
Representing Thailand
World Junior Championships
Gold medal – first place	2009 Alor Setar	Mixed doubles
Bronze medal – third place	2009 Alor Setar	Girls' doubles
Bronze medal – third place	2009 Alor Setar	Mixed team
Asian Junior Championships
Bronze medal – third place	2009 Kuala Lumpur	Girls' doubles
Bronze medal – third place	2009 Kuala Lumpur	Mixed doubles
Bronze medal – third place	2009 Kuala Lumpur	Mixed team

Rodjana Chuthabunditkul (Thai: รจนา จุฑาบัณฑิตกุล; born 14 August 1991) is a Thai badminton player. She won the 2009 BWF World Junior Championships in mixed doubles, playing with Maneepong Jongjit.

== Achievements ==
=== BWF World Junior Championships ===
Women's doubles
Year	Venue	Partner	Opponent	Score	Result
2009	Stadium Sultan Abdul Halim; Alor Setar, Malaysia	(Thailand) Sapsiree Taerattanachai	(China) Tang Jinhua (China) Xia Huan	7–21, 15–21	Bronze

Mixed doubles
Year	Venue	Partner	Opponent	Score	Result
2009	Stadium Sultan Abdul Halim; Alor Setar, Malaysia	(Thailand) Maneepong Jongjit	(Indonesia) Angga Pratama (Indonesia) Della Destiara Haris	21–19, 14–21, 21–17	Gold

=== Asia Junior Championships ===
Girls' doubles
Year	Venue	Partner	Opponent	Score	Result
2009	Stadium Juara, Kuala Lumpur, Malaysia	(Thailand) Sapsiree Taerattanachai	(China) Luo Ying (China) Luo Yu	16–21, 10–21	Bronze

Mixed doubles
Year	Venue	Partner	Opponent	Score	Result
2009	Stadium Juara, Kuala Lumpur, Malaysia	(Thailand) Maneepong Jongjit	(China) Liu Peixuan (China) Xia Huan	18–21, 13–21	Bronze

=== BWF International Challenge/Series ===
Women's doubles
Year	Tournament	Partner	Opponent	Score	Result
2013	Smiling Fish International	(Thailand) Jongkonphan Kittiharakul	(Thailand) Narissapat Lam (Thailand) Puttita Supajirakul	17–21, 10–21	(silver) Runner-up
2012	Bahrain International	(Thailand) Chanida Julrattanamanee	(Thailand) Pacharakamol Arkornsakul (Thailand) Jongkonphan Kittiharakul	21–14, 21–18	(gold) Winner
2010	Kaohsiung International	(Thailand) Wiranpatch Hongchookeat	(Chinese Taipei) Chou Chia-chi (Chinese Taipei) Tsai Pei-ling	11–21, 12–21	(silver) Runner-up
2010	Smiling Fish International	(Thailand) Wiranpatch Hongchookeat	(Thailand) Ratchanok Intanon (Thailand) Pijitjan Wangpaiboonkj	22–20, 21–11	(gold) Winner

Mixed doubles
Year	Tournament	Partner	Opponent	Score	Result
2013	Smiling Fish International	(Thailand) Wannawat Ampunsuwan	(Thailand) Patiphat Chalardchaleam (Thailand) Jongkonphan Kittiharakul	12–21, 11–21	(silver) Runner-up
2010	Smiling Fish International	(Thailand) Maneepong Jongjit	(Thailand) Patiphat Chalardchalaem (Thailand) Savitree Amitrapai	19–21, 20–22	(silver) Runner-up

BWF International Challenge tournament
BWF International Series tournament
BWF Future Series tournament
