= Liu Peixuan =

Chinese badminton player (born 1992)

Liu Peixuan 刘沛轩
Personal information
- Born: 7 November 1992 (age 34) Changsha, Hunan, China
- Height: 1.80 m (5 ft 11 in)
- Weight: 68 kg (150 lb)

Sport
- Country: China
- Sport: Badminton
- Handedness: Right

Men's & mixed doubles
- Highest ranking: 125 (MD 28 July 2011); 73 (XD 31 March 2011)
- BWF profile
Medal record
Men's badminton
Representing China
World Junior Championships
Gold medal – first place	2009 Alor Setar	Mixed team
Bronze medal – third place	2009 Alor Setar	Mixed doubles
Asian Junior Championships
Silver medal – second place	2009 Kuala Lumpur	Mixed doubles
Silver medal – second place	2009 Kuala Lumpur	Mixed team

Liu Peixuan (Chinese: 刘沛轩; pinyin: Liú Pèixuān; born 7 November 1992) is a Chinese badminton player from Changsha, Hunan. He was selected to join national junior team competed at the 2009 Asian Junior Championships, winning two silver medals in the mixed doubles and team event. Liu later competed at the World Junior Championships, helped the team clinch the mixed team title, and won the bronze medal in the mixed doubles event. He won the senior international title at the 2010 India Grand Prix in the mixed doubles event partnered with Tang Jinhua.

== Achievements ==
=== BWF World Junior Championships ===
Mixed doubles
Year	Venue	Partner	Opponent	Score	Result
2009	Stadium Sultan Abdul Halim; Alor Setar, Malaysia	(China) Xia Huan	(Thailand) Maneepong Jongjit (Thailand) Rodjana Chuthabunditkul	19–21, 10–21	Bronze

=== Asian Junior Championships ===
Mixed doubles
Year	Venue	Partner	Opponent	Score	Result
2009	Stadium Juara; Kuala Lumpur, Malaysia	(China) Xia Huan	(China) Lu Kai (China) Bao Yixin	15–21, 19–21	Silver

=== BWF Grand Prix ===
The BWF Grand Prix had two levels, the BWF Grand Prix and Grand Prix Gold. It was a series of badminton tournaments sanctioned by the Badminton World Federation (BWF) which was held from 2007 to 2017.

Mixed doubles
Year	Tournament	Partner	Opponent	Score	Result
2010	India Grand Prix	(China) Tang Jinhua	(Malaysia) Gan Teik Chai (Malaysia) Ng Hui Lin	21–17, 21–17	(gold) Winner

BWF Grand Prix Gold tournament
BWF Grand Prix tournament
