= Xia Huan =

Chinese badminton player (born 1992)

Xia Huan 夏欢
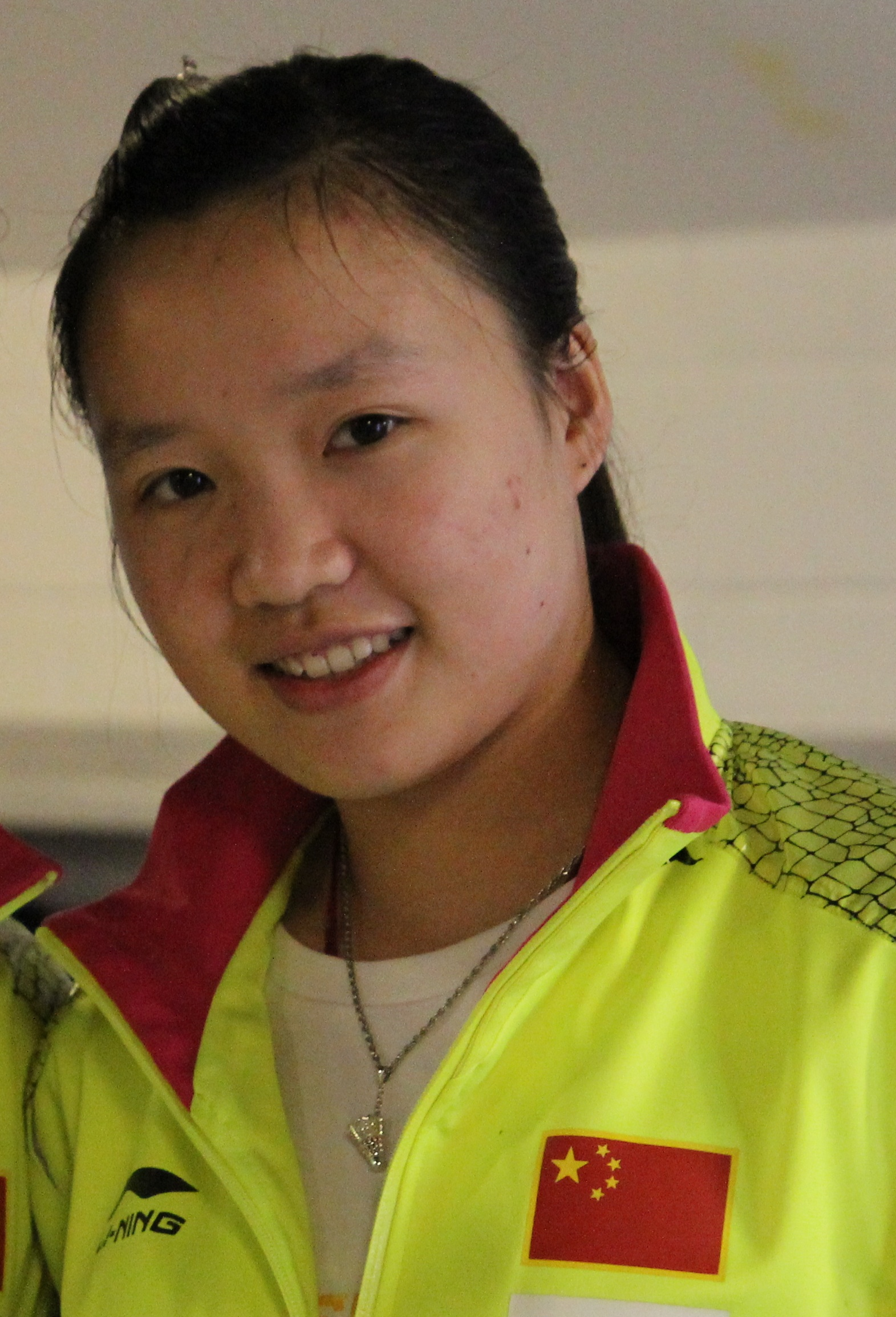
- Xia in 2012

Personal information
- Born: 30 January 1992 (age 34) Anhua, Yiyang, China
- Height: 1.70 m (5 ft 7 in)
- Weight: 65 kg (143 lb)

Sport
- Country: China
- Sport: Badminton
- Handedness: Right
- Coached by: Chen Qiqiu

Women's & mixed doubles
- Highest ranking: 7 (WD 13 September 2012); 23 (XD 25 October 2012)
- BWF profile
Medal record
Women's badminton
Representing China
Asian Championships
Bronze medal – third place	2014 Gimcheon	Women's doubles
Bronze medal – third place	2014 Gimcheon	Mixed doubles
World Junior Championships
Gold medal – first place	2008 Pune	Mixed team
Gold medal – first place	2009 Alor Setar	Girls' doubles
Gold medal – first place	2009 Alor Setar	Mixed team
Gold medal – first place	2010 Guadalajara	Mixed team
Silver medal – second place	2010 Guadalajara	Girls' doubles
Bronze medal – third place	2008 Pune	Girls' doubles
Bronze medal – third place	2009 Alor Setar	Mixed doubles
Asian Junior Championships
Gold medal – first place	2008 Kuala Lumpur	Mixed team
Gold medal – first place	2009 Kuala Lumpur	Girls' doubles
Gold medal – first place	2010 Kuala Lumpur	Girls' doubles
Gold medal – first place	2010 Kuala Lumpur	Mixed team
Silver medal – second place	2008 Kuala Lumpur	Girls' doubles
Silver medal – second place	2009 Kuala Lumpur	Mixed doubles
Silver medal – second place	2009 Kuala Lumpur	Mixed team

Xia Huan (Chinese: 夏欢; pinyin: Xià Huān; born 30 January 1992) is a Chinese badminton doubles player.

== Career ==
Xia became World Junior Champion in the girls' doubles event in 2009 with Tang Jinhua held in Alor Setar, Malaysia. One year later in Guadalajara, Mexico, the pair almost managed to defend their World Juniors title, reaching the final, which they eventually lost to compatriots Bao Yixin and Ou Dongni (13–21, 18–21). The pair also won the 2009 and 2010 Asian Junior Championships.

In 2011, Xia Huan and Tang Jinhua won their first major title, the China Masters Superseries. They also reached the semi-finals at the 2011 Korea Grand Prix Gold, and the final at the China Open Superseries. In 2012, Xia and Tang won the German and Swiss Open Grand Prix Gold.

== Achievements ==
=== Asian Championships ===
Women's doubles
Year	Venue	Partner	Opponent	Score	Result
2014	Gimcheon Indoor Stadium; Gimcheon, South Korea	(China) Zhong Qianxin	(South Korea) Jung Kyung-eun (South Korea) Kim Ha-na	23–21, 15–21, 16–21	Bronze

Mixed doubles
Year	Venue	Partner	Opponent	Score	Result
2014	Gimcheon Indoor Stadium; Gimcheon, South Korea	(China) Zhang Wen	(Hong Kong) Lee Chun Hei (Hong Kong) Chau Hoi Wah	13–21, 15–21	Bronze

=== BWF World Junior Championships ===
Girls' doubles
Year	Venue	Partner	Opponent	Score	Result
2008	Shree Shiv Chhatrapati Badminton Hall; Pune, India	(China) Lu Lu	(Singapore) Fu Mingtian (Singapore) Yao Lei	18–21, 21–13, 18–21	Bronze
2009	Stadium Sultan Abdul Halim; Alor Setar, Malaysia	(China) Tang Jinhua	(Indonesia) Suci Rizky Andini (Indonesia) Tiara Rosalia Nuraidah	21–9, 21–18	Gold
2010	Domo del Code Jalisco; Guadalajara, Mexico	(China) Tang Jinhua	(China) Bao Yixin (China) Ou Dongni	13–21, 18–21	Silver

Mixed doubles
Year	Venue	Partner	Opponent	Score	Result
2009	Stadium Sultan Abdul Halim; Alor Setar, Malaysia	(China) Liu Peixuan	(Thailand) Maneepong Jongjit (Thailand) Rodjana Chuthabunditkul	19–21, 10–21	Bronze

=== Asian Junior Championships ===
Girls' doubles
Year	Venue	Partner	Opponent	Score	Result
2008	Stadium Juara; Kuala Lumpur, Malaysia	(China) Lu Lu	(China) Xie Jing (China) Zhong Qianxin	22–20, 14–21, 20–22	Silver
2009	Stadium Juara; Kuala Lumpur, Malaysia	(China) Tang Jinhua	(China) Luo Ying (China) Luo Yu	14–21, 21–17, 21–13	Gold
2010	Stadium Juara; Kuala Lumpur, Malaysia	(China) Tang Jinhua	(China) Bao Yixin (China) Ou Dongni	21–17, 21–8	Gold

Mixed doubles
Year	Venue	Partner	Opponent	Score	Result
2009	Stadium Juara; Kuala Lumpur, Malaysia	(China) Liu Peixuan	(China) Lu Kai (China) Bao Yixin	15–21, 19–21	Silver

=== BWF Superseries ===
The BWF Superseries, which was launched on 14 December 2006 and implemented in 2007, is a series of elite badminton tournaments, sanctioned by the Badminton World Federation (BWF). BWF Superseries levels are Superseries and Superseries Premier. A season of Superseries consists of twelve tournaments around the world that have been introduced since 2011. Successful players are invited to the Superseries Finals, which are held at the end of each year.

Women's doubles
Year	Tournament	Partner	Opponent	Score	Result
2011	China Masters	(China) Tang Jinhua	(China) Wang Xiaoli (China) Yu Yang	21–19 retired	(gold) Winner
2011	China Open	(China) Tang Jinhua	(China) Wang Xiaoli (China) Yu Yang	11–21, 10–21	(silver) Runner-up

BWF Super Series Finals tournament
BWF Super Series Premier tournament
BWF Super Series tournament

=== BWF Grand Prix ===
The BWF Grand Prix had two levels, the BWF Grand Prix and Grand Prix Gold. It was a series of badminton tournaments sanctioned by the Badminton World Federation (BWF) which was held from 2007 to 2017.

Women's doubles
Year	Tournament	Partner	Opponent	Score	Result
2010	Vietnam Open	(China) Tang Jinhua	(China) Ma Jin (China) Zhong Qianxin	19–21, 23–21, 13–21	(silver) Runner-up
2010	India Grand Prix	(China) Tang Jinhua	(Malaysia) Ng Hui Ern (Malaysia) Ng Hui Lin	21–8, 21–19	(gold) Winner
2012	German Open	(China) Tang Jinhua	(South Korea) Jung Kyung-eun (South Korea) Kim Ha-na	23–21, 21–13	(gold) Winner
2012	Swiss Open	(China) Tang Jinhua	(China) Bao Yixin (China) Zhong Qianxin	21–17, 21–10	(gold) Winner
2015	New Zealand Open	(China) Zhong Qianxin	(Japan) Yuki Fukushima (Japan) Sayaka Hirota	17–21, 24–22, 21–19	(gold) Winner

Mixed doubles
Year	Tournament	Partner	Opponent	Score	Result
2014	China Masters	(China) Wang Yilyu	(China) Lu Kai (China) Huang Yaqiong	12–21, 14–21	(silver) Runner-up
2015	New Zealand Open	(China) Yu Xiaoyu	(China) Zheng Siwei (China) Chen Qingchen	14–21, 8–21	(silver) Runner-up

BWF Grand Prix Gold tournament
BWF Grand Prix tournament

=== BWF International Challenge/Series ===
Mixed doubles
Year	Tournament	Partner	Opponent	Score	Result
2014	China International	(China) Zhang Wen	(China) Wang Yilyu (China) Ou Dongni	18–21, 21–15, 19–21	(silver) Runner-up

BWF International Challenge tournament
BWF International Series tournament
