= 2009 Badminton Asia Junior Championships =

2009 Asian Junior Badminton Championships
Tournament details
- Dates: 12–19 July 2009
- Edition: 12
- Venue: Stadium Juara
- Location: Kuala Lumpur, Malaysia

The 2009 Asian Junior Badminton Championships is an Asia continental junior championships to crown the best U-19 badminton players across Asia. This tournament were held in Kuala Lumpur, Malaysia from 12–19 July.

== Venue ==
This tournament were held at Stadium Juara in Kuala Lumpur.

== Medalists ==
Event	Gold	Silver	Bronze
Teams	Malaysia; Chooi Kah Ming; Goh Jian Hao; Syawal Ismail; Ow Yao Han; Pang Zheng Lin; Yew Hong Kheng; Iskandar Zulkarnain Zainuddin; Zulfadli Zulkiffli; Soniia Cheah Su Ya; Lai Pei Jing; Shevon Jemie Lai; Ng Hui Ern; Florah Ng; Ong Boon Hui; Tee Jing Yi; Yang Li Lian	China; Guo Junjie; Li Gen; Li Qi; Li Yisheng; Liu Peixuan; Lu Kai; Tian Houwei; Wang Tianyang; Bao Yixin; Chen Xiaojia; Liu Yingmei; Luo Ying; Luo Yu; Suo Di; Tang Jinhua; Xia Huan	Thailand; Watchara Buranakruea; Tin Caballes; Maneepong Jongjit; Nipitphon Phuangphuapet; Pisit Poodchalat; Pawarit Supasri; Parinyawat Thongnuam; Thunphukkanan Ampunsuwan; Porntip Buranaprasertsuk; Chayanit Chaladchalam; Rodjana Chuthabunditkul; Ratchanok Intanon; Rawinda Prajongjai; Artima Serithammarak; Sapsiree Taerattanachai
Teams	Malaysia; Chooi Kah Ming; Goh Jian Hao; Syawal Ismail; Ow Yao Han; Pang Zheng Lin; Yew Hong Kheng; Iskandar Zulkarnain Zainuddin; Zulfadli Zulkiffli; Soniia Cheah Su Ya; Lai Pei Jing; Shevon Jemie Lai; Ng Hui Ern; Florah Ng; Ong Boon Hui; Tee Jing Yi; Yang Li Lian	China; Guo Junjie; Li Gen; Li Qi; Li Yisheng; Liu Peixuan; Lu Kai; Tian Houwei; Wang Tianyang; Bao Yixin; Chen Xiaojia; Liu Yingmei; Luo Ying; Luo Yu; Suo Di; Tang Jinhua; Xia Huan	Japan; Tatsuya Hasegawa; Shohei Hoshino; Akira Kobayashi; Izumi Okoshi; Naoto Otaki; Tatsuya Watanabe; Misato Aratama; Naoko Fukuman; Kanako Konishi; Ayumi Mine; Minatsu Mitani; Sayaka Takahashi
Boys' singles	(China) Tian Houwei	(Malaysia) Iskandar Zulkarnain Zainuddin	(Malaysia) Ramdan Misbun
Boys' singles	(China) Tian Houwei	(Malaysia) Iskandar Zulkarnain Zainuddin	(Malaysia) Syawal Ismail
Girls' singles	(China) Chen Xiaojia	(Chinese Taipei) Tai Tzu-ying	(Indonesia) Febby Angguni
Girls' singles	(China) Chen Xiaojia	(Chinese Taipei) Tai Tzu-ying	(Indonesia) Ana Rovita
Boys' doubles	(Indonesia) Angga Pratama (Indonesia) Yohanes Rendy Sugiarto	(Malaysia) Ow Yao Han (Malaysia) Yew Hong Kheng	(South Korea) Kang Ji-wook (South Korea) Choi Seung-il
Boys' doubles	(Indonesia) Angga Pratama (Indonesia) Yohanes Rendy Sugiarto	(Malaysia) Ow Yao Han (Malaysia) Yew Hong Kheng	(Thailand) Nipitphon Puangpuapech (Thailand) Tin Caballes
Girls' doubles	(China) Tang Jinhua (China) Xia Huan	(China) Luo Ying (China) Luo Yu	(Malaysia) Ng Hui Ern (Malaysia) Lai Pei Jing
Girls' doubles	(China) Tang Jinhua (China) Xia Huan	(China) Luo Ying (China) Luo Yu	(Thailand) Rodjana Chuthabunditkul (Thailand) Sapsiree Taerattanachai
Mixed doubles	(China) Lu Kai (China) Bao Yixin	(China) Liu Peixuan (China) Xia Huan	(Thailand) Maneepong Jongjit (Thailand) Rodjana Chuthabunditkul
Mixed doubles	(China) Lu Kai (China) Bao Yixin	(China) Liu Peixuan (China) Xia Huan	(India) Pranav Chopra (India) Prajakta Sawant

== Medal table ==
Rank	Nation	Gold	Silver	Bronze	Total
1	China (CHN)	4	3	0	7
2	Malaysia (MAS)	1	2	3	6
3	Indonesia (INA)	1	0	2	3
4	Chinese Taipei (TPE)	0	1	0	1
5	Thailand (THA)	0	0	4	4
6	India (IND)	0	0	1	1
6	Japan (JPN)	0	0	1	1
6	South Korea (KOR)	0	0	1	1
Totals (8 entries)		6	6	12	24
