= Lu Kai (badminton) =

Chinese badminton player

Lu Kai 鲁恺
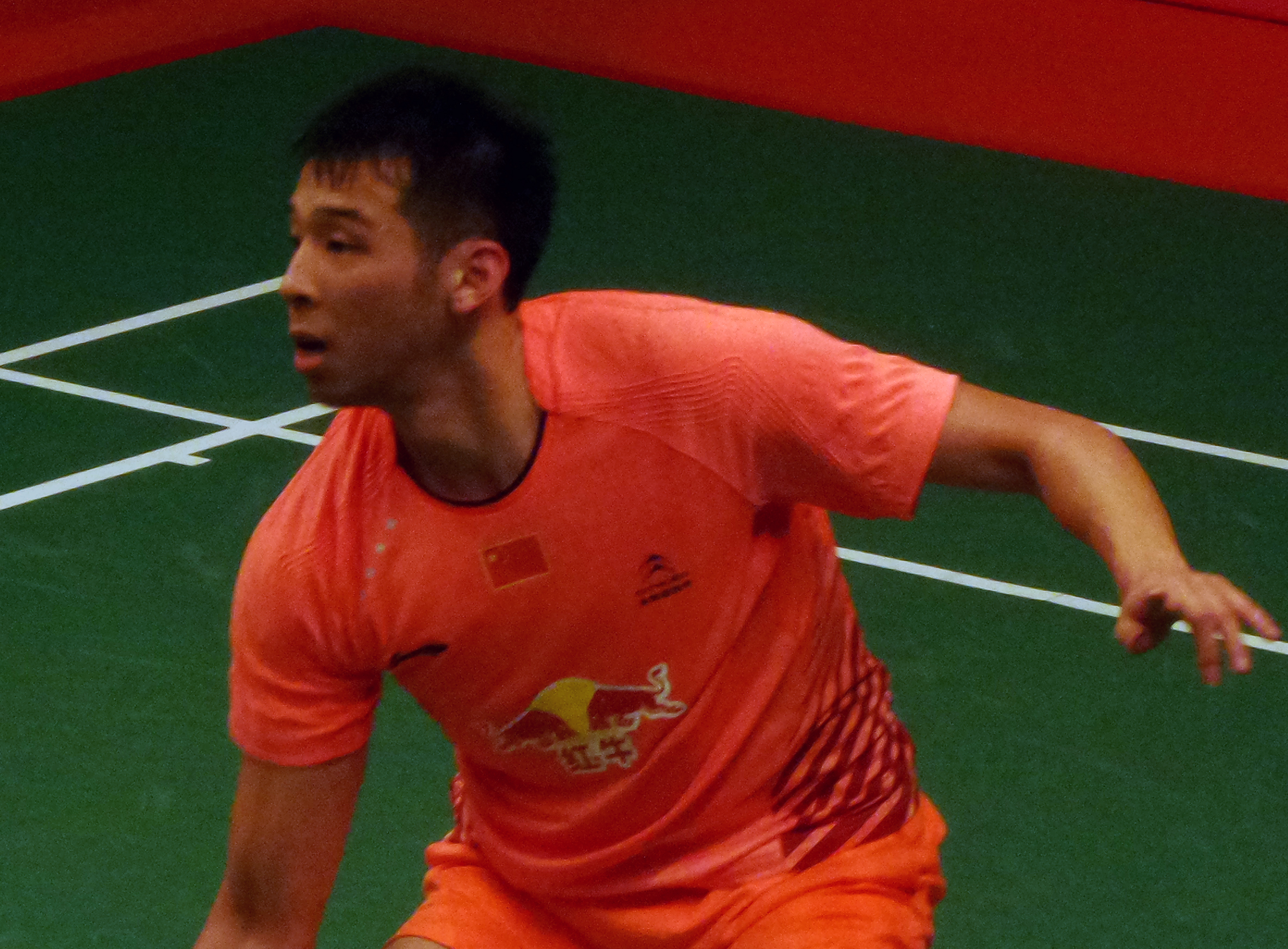
- Lu Kai at the 2015 BWF World Championships

Personal information
- Born: 4 October 1991 (age 35) Nanning, Guangxi, China
- Years active: 2008–2019
- Height: 1.91 m (6 ft 3 in)

Sport
- Country: China
- Sport: Badminton
- Handedness: Right
- Retired: 21 November 2019

Men's & mixed doubles
- Highest ranking: 13 (MD 9 April 2015); 2 (XD with Huang Yaqiong 2 February 2018)
- BWF profile
Medal record
Men's badminton
Representing China
Sudirman Cup
| Gold medal – first place | 2015 Donggun | Mixed team |
| Silver medal – second place | 2017 Gold Coast | Mixed team |
Asian Championships
| Gold medal – first place | 2017 Wuhan | Mixed doubles |
| Bronze medal – third place | 2015 Wuhan | Men's doubles |
World Junior Championships
| Gold medal – first place | 2009 Alor Setar | Mixed team |
| Bronze medal – third place | 2009 Alor Setar | Mixed doubles |
Asian Junior Championships
| Gold medal – first place | 2009 Kuala Lumpur | Mixed doubles |
| Silver medal – second place | 2009 Kuala Lumpur | Mixed team |

Lu Kai (Chinese: 鲁恺; pinyin: Lǔ Kǎi; born 4 October 1991) is a Chinese former badminton player who specializes in doubles. He won the mixed doubles gold medal at the 2009 Asian Junior Championships partnered with Bao Yixin, and later at the 2017 Asian Championships with Huang Yaqiong.

== Achievements ==
=== Asian Championships ===
Men's doubles
| Year | Venue | Partner | Opponent | Score | Result |
|---|---|---|---|---|---|
| 2015 | Wuhan Sports Center Gymnasium; Wuhan, China | (China) Cai Yun | (Indonesia) Mohammad Ahsan (Indonesia) Hendra Setiawan | 12–21, 21–18, 16–21 | Bronze |

Mixed doubles
| Year | Venue | Partner | Opponent | Score | Result |
|---|---|---|---|---|---|
| 2017 | Wuhan Sports Center Gymnasium; Wuhan, China | (China) Huang Yaqiong | (Thailand) Dechapol Puavaranukroh (Thailand) Sapsiree Taerattanachai | 21–18, 21–11 | Gold |

=== BWF World Junior Championships ===
Mixed doubles
| Year | Venue | Partner | Opponent | Score | Result |
|---|---|---|---|---|---|
| 2009 | Stadium Sultan Abdul Halim; Alor Setar, Malaysia | (China) Bao Yixin | (Indonesia) Angga Pratama (Indonesia) Della Destiara Haris | 19–21, 18–21 | Bronze |

=== Asian Junior Championships ===
Mixed doubles
| Year | Venue | Partner | Opponent | Score | Result |
|---|---|---|---|---|---|
| 2009 | Stadium Juara; Kuala Lumpur, Malaysia | (China) Bao Yixin | (China) Liu Peixuan (China) Xia Huan | 21–15, 21–19 | Gold |

=== BWF World Tour ===
The BWF World Tour, which was announced on 19 March 2017 and implemented in 2018, is a series of elite badminton tournaments sanctioned by the Badminton World Federation (BWF). The BWF World Tours are divided into levels of World Tour Finals, Super 1000, Super 750, Super 500, Super 300 (part of the HSBC World Tour), and the BWF Tour Super 100.

Mixed doubles
| Year | Tournament | Level | Partner | Opponent | Score | Result |
|---|---|---|---|---|---|---|
| 2018 | SaarLorLux Open | Super 100 | (China) Chen Lu | (England) Marcus Ellis (England) Lauren Smith | 21–19, 18–21, 10–21 | (silver) Runner-up |

=== BWF Superseries ===
The BWF Superseries, which was launched on 14 December 2006 and implemented in 2007, is a series of elite badminton tournaments, sanctioned by the Badminton World Federation (BWF). BWF Superseries levels are Superseries and Superseries Premier. A season of Superseries consists of twelve tournaments around the world that have been introduced since 2011. Successful players are invited to the Superseries Finals, which are held at the end of each year.

Men's doubles
| Year | Tournament | Partner | Opponent | Score | Result |
|---|---|---|---|---|---|
| 2014 | Singapore Open | (China) Cai Yun | (Chinese Taipei) Lee Sheng-mu (Chinese Taipei) Tsai Chia-hsin | 21–19, 21–14 | (gold) Winner |
| 2015 | Australian Open | (China) Liu Cheng | (South Korea) Lee Yong-dae (South Korea) Yoo Yeon-seong | 16–21, 17–21 | (silver) Runner-up |
| 2015 | Denmark Open | (China) Liu Cheng | (South Korea) Lee Yong-dae (South Korea) Yoo Yeon-seong | 8–21, 14–21 | (silver) Runner-up |

Mixed doubles
| Year | Tournament | Partner | Opponent | Score | Result |
|---|---|---|---|---|---|
| 2015 | Singapore Open | (China) Huang Yaqiong | (China) Zhang Nan (China) Zhao Yunlei | Walkover | (silver) Runner-up |
| 2016 | India Open | (China) Huang Yaqiong | (Indonesia) Riky Widianto (Indonesia) Richi Puspita Dili | 21–13, 21–16 | (gold) Winner |
| 2016 | Australian Open | (China) Huang Yaqiong | (China) Zheng Siwei (China) Chen Qingchen | 21–18, 21–14 | (gold) Winner |
| 2017 | All England Open | (China) Huang Yaqiong | (Malaysia) Chan Peng Soon (Malaysia) Goh Liu Ying | 18–21, 21–19, 21–16 | (gold) Winner |
| 2017 | India Open | (China) Huang Yaqiong | (China) Zheng Siwei (China) Chen Qingchen | 24–22, 14–21, 21–17 | (gold) Winner |
| 2017 | Malaysia Open | (China) Huang Yaqiong | (China) Zheng Siwei (China) Chen Qingchen | 15–21, 18–21 | (silver) Runner-up |
| 2017 | Singapore Open | (China) Huang Yaqiong | (Thailand) Dechapol Puavaranukroh (Thailand) Sapsiree Taerattanachai | 19–21, 21–16, 21–11 | (gold) Winner |

BWF Super Series Premier tournament
BWF Super Series tournament

=== BWF Grand Prix ===
The BWF Grand Prix had two levels, the Grand Prix and Grand Prix Gold. It was a series of badminton tournaments sanctioned by the Badminton World Federation (BWF) and played between 2007 and 2017.

Men's doubles
| Year | Tournament | Partner | Opponent | Score | Result |
|---|---|---|---|---|---|
| 2015 | Swiss Open | (China) Cai Yun | (Malaysia) Goh V Shem (Malaysia) Tan Wee Kiong | 21–19, 14–21, 21–17 | (gold) Winner |
| 2016 | Macau Open | (China) Zhang Nan | (Chinese Taipei) Lee Jhe-huei (Chinese Taipei) Lee Yang | 21–17, 18–21, 19–21 | (silver) Runner-up |

Mixed doubles
| Year | Tournament | Partner | Opponent | Score | Result |
|---|---|---|---|---|---|
| 2013 | Macau Open | (China) Huang Yaqiong | (South Korea) Choi Sol-gyu (South Korea) Chae Yoo-jung | 17–21, 21–18, 21–17 | (gold) Winner |
| 2014 | Malaysia Grand Prix Gold | (China) Huang Yaqiong | (Indonesia) Praveen Jordan (Indonesia) Debby Susanto | 21–14, 21–13 | (gold) Winner |
| 2014 | China Masters | (China) Huang Yaqiong | (China) Wang Yilyu (China) Xia Huan | 21–12, 21–14 | (gold) Winner |
| 2015 | Swiss Open | (China) Huang Yaqiong | (China) Liu Cheng (China) Bao Yixin | 17–21, 22–20, 21–13 | (gold) Winner |
| 2017 | German Open | (China) Huang Yaqiong | (China) Zhang Nan (China) Li Yinhui | 20–22, 11–21 | (silver) Runner-up |

BWF Grand Prix Gold tournament
