= 2009 BWF World Junior Championships =

Tournament details
- Dates: October 23, 2009 - November 1, 2009
- Edition: 11th
- Level: International
- Venue: Sultan Abdul Halim Stadium
- Location: Alor Setar, Malaysia

The 2009 BWF World Junior Championship is the eleventh edition of the BWF World Junior Championships, a junior badminton world championship which was held in Alor Setar, Malaysia, from October 23 to November 1, 2009. Six competitions were played during the event with singles in both the boys and girls. Also doubles were played in both sexes as well as the mixed doubles which was played. The final competition was a team event which saw 21 teams compete for the team's title.

== Medalists ==
| Event | Gold | Silver | Bronze |
|---|---|---|---|
| Teams | China: Guo Junjie; Li Gen; Li Qi; Li Yisheng; Liu Cheng; Liu Peixuan; Lu Kai; Tian Houwei; Bao Yixin; Chen Xiaojia; Deng Xuan; Luo Yu; Suo Di; Tang Jinhua; Xia Huan; Yao Xue | Malaysia: Chooi Kah Ming; Goh Jian Hao; Goh Sze Onn; Lau Win Hwi; Lim Yu Sheng; Misbun Ramdan Misbun; Muhammad Syawal Mohd Ismail; Ow Yao Han; Pang Zheng Lin; Tan Wee Tat; Iskandar Zulkarnain Zainuddin; Zulfadli Zulkiffli; Sonia Cheah Su Ya; Lai Pei Jing; Shevon Jemie Lai; Ng Hui Ern; Florah Ng Siew Fong; Ong Boon Hui; Tee Jing Yi; Yang Li Lian; Yew Hong Kheng | Thailand: Watchara Buranakrue; D. Caballes Tin; Maneepong Jongjit; Nipitphon Phuangphuapet; Pisit Poodchalat; Pawarit Supasri; Thunphukkanan Ampunsuwan; Porntip Buranaprasertsuk; Chayanit Chaladchalam; Rodjana Chuthabunditkul; Ratchanok Intanon; Nitchaon Jindapol; Artima Serithammarak; Sapsiree Taerattanachai |
| Boys singles | (China) Tian Houwei | (Malaysia) Iskandar Zulkarnain Zainuddin | (Japan) Tatsuya Watanabe |
| Boys singles | (China) Tian Houwei | (Malaysia) Iskandar Zulkarnain Zainuddin | (Chinese Taipei) Hsu Jen-Hao |
| Girls singles | (Thailand) Ratchanok Inthanon | (Thailand) Porntip Buranaprasertsuk | (China) Suo Di |
| Girls singles | (Thailand) Ratchanok Inthanon | (Thailand) Porntip Buranaprasertsuk | (China) Chen Xiaojia |
| Boys doubles | (Malaysia) Chooi Kah Ming (Malaysia) Ow Yao Han | (Indonesia) Berry Angriawan (Indonesia) Muhammad Ulinnuha | (Indonesia) Angga Pratama (Indonesia) Yohanes Rendy Sugiarto |
| Boys doubles | (Malaysia) Chooi Kah Ming (Malaysia) Ow Yao Han | (Indonesia) Berry Angriawan (Indonesia) Muhammad Ulinnuha | (Thailand) Tin Caballes (Thailand) Nipitphon Puangpuapech |
| Girls doubles | (China) Tang Jinhua (China) Xia Huan | (Indonesia) Suci Rizki Andini (Indonesia) Tiara Rosalia Nuraidah | (Thailand) Rodjana Chuthabunditkul (Thailand) Sapsiree Taerattanachai |
| Girls doubles | (China) Tang Jinhua (China) Xia Huan | (Indonesia) Suci Rizki Andini (Indonesia) Tiara Rosalia Nuraidah | (Hong Kong) Poon Lok Yan (Hong Kong) Tse Ying Suet |
| Mixed doubles | (Thailand) Maneepong Jongjit (Thailand) Rodjana Chuthabunditkul | (Indonesia) Angga Pratama (Indonesia) Della Destiara Haris | (China) Lu Kai (China) Bao Yixin |
| Mixed doubles | (Thailand) Maneepong Jongjit (Thailand) Rodjana Chuthabunditkul | (Indonesia) Angga Pratama (Indonesia) Della Destiara Haris | (China) Liu Peixuan (China) Xia Huan |

== Team competition ==
A total of 21 countries competed at the team competition in 2009 BWF World Junior Championships.

=== Final positions ===
1. China
2. Malaysia
3. Thailand
4. Chinese Taipei
5. Indonesia
6. Japan
7. India
8. Hong Kong
9. Denmark
10. Philippines
11. Russia
12. Singapore
13. Vietnam
14. England
15. France
16. New Zealand
17. Germany
18. Canada
19. Macau
20. Sri Lanka
21. Australia
22. ~~Cambodia~~ (Withdrew)

=== Final Round ===
China
3
Alor Setar, Malaysia
October 26, 2009

Malaysia
0

| | | | 1 | 2 | 3 |
|---|---|---|---|---|---|---|
| 1 | (China) (Malaysia) | Lu Kai / Bao Yixin; Ow Yao Han / Ng Hui Ern | 21; 5 | 21; 19 |
| 2 | (China) (Malaysia) | Tian Houwei; Syawal Ismail | 21; 15 | 25; 23 |
| 3 | (China) (Malaysia) | Lu Kai / Liu Peixuan; Ow Yao Han / Chooi Kah Ming | 21; 12 | 18; 21 | 21; 17 |
| 4 | (China) (Malaysia) | Chen Xiaojia; Tee Jing Yi | | | | not played |
| 5 | (China) (Malaysia) | Tang Jinhua / Xia Huan; Ng Hui Ern / Lai Pei Jing | | | | not played |

== Medal table ==
| Rank | Nation | Gold | Silver | Bronze | Total |
|---|---|---|---|---|---|
| 1 | China | 3 | 0 | 4 | 7 |
| 2 | Thailand | 2 | 1 | 3 | 6 |
| 3 | Malaysia | 1 | 2 | 0 | 3 |
| 4 | Indonesia | 0 | 3 | 1 | 4 |
| 5 | Chinese Taipei | 0 | 0 | 1 | 1 |
| 5 | Hong Kong | 0 | 0 | 1 | 1 |
| 5 | Japan | 0 | 0 | 1 | 1 |
| Totals (7 entries) | | 6 | 6 | 11 | 23 |
