= Tee Jing Yi =

Malaysian badminton player (born 1991)

Personal information
- Native name: 郑清忆 (Chinese)
- Born: 8 February 1991 (age 35) George Town, Penang, Malaysia
- Years active: 2005–present
- Height: 1.66 m (5 ft 5 in)
- Weight: 50 kg (110 lb)

Sport
- Country: Malaysia
- Sport: Badminton
- Handedness: Right

Women's singles & doubles
- Highest ranking: 28 (WS 5 January 2015); 41 (WD 12 April 2018)
- Current ranking: 43 (WD 19 April 2018)
- BWF profile
Medal record
Women's badminton
Representing Malaysia
Commonwealth Games
Gold medal – first place	2014 Glasgow	Mixed team
Southeast Asian Games
Silver medal – second place	2015 Singapore	Women's team
Bronze medal – third place	2011 Jakarta	Women's team
World Junior Championships
Silver medal – second place	2009 Alor Setar	Mixed team
Bronze medal – third place	2006 Incheon	Mixed team
Bronze medal – third place	2008 Pune	Mixed team
Asian Junior Championships
Gold medal – first place	2009 Kuala Lumpur	Mixed team
Gold medal – first place	2007 Kuala Lumpur	Mixed team
Silver medal – second place	2007 Kuala Lumpur	Girls' doubles
Bronze medal – third place	2008 Kuala Lumpur	Mixed team

Tee Jing Yi
- Traditional Chinese: 鄭清億
- Simplified Chinese: 郑清亿
Transcriptions
Standard Mandarin
- Hanyu Pinyin: Zhèng Qīngyì
Yue: Cantonese
- Jyutping: Zeng6 Cing1 Jik1
Southern Min
- Hokkien POJ: Tēⁿ Chheng-ek

Tee Jing Yi (born 8 February 1991 in George Town, Penang) is a Malaysian badminton player. She competed at the 2012 London and 2016 Rio Summer Olympics in the women's singles event.

== Achievements ==
=== Asia Junior Championships ===
Girls' doubles
Year	Venue	Partner	Opponent	Score	Result
2007	Stadium Juara; Kuala Lumpur, Malaysia	(Malaysia) Lydia Cheah	(Indonesia) Puspita Richi Dili (Indonesia) Debby Susanto	12–21, 21–15, 18–21	Silver

=== BWF International Challenge/Series (5 titles, 3 runners-up) ===
Women's singles
Year	Tournament	Opponent	Score	Result
2015	TATA Open India International	(Thailand) Pornpawee Chochuwong	21–16, 11–21, 15–21	(silver) Runner-up
2015	Indonesia International	(Indonesia) Gregoria Mariska Tunjung	15–21, 21–15, 7–21	(silver) Runner-up
2014	Iran Fajr International	(Malaysia) Yang Li Lian	21–10, 21–15	(gold) Winner
2011	Vietnam International	(Thailand) Sapsiree Taerattanachai	21–19, 21–15	(gold) Winner

Women's doubles
Year	Tournament	Partner	Opponent	Score	Result
2018	Malaysia International	(Malaysia) Soong Fie Cho	(Malaysia) Lim Chiew Sien (Malaysia) Tan Sueh Jeou	21–13, 21–10	(gold) Winner
2017	Malaysia International Series	(Malaysia) Soong Fie Cho	(Thailand) Kittipak Dubthuk (Thailand) Natcha Saengchote	21–16, 21–17	(gold) Winner
2017	Indonesia International	(Malaysia) Soong Fie Cho	(Indonesia) Dian Fitriani (Indonesia) Nadya Melati	21–16, 16–21, 21–19	(gold) Winner
2017	Vietnam International	(Malaysia) Joyce Choong	(Japan) Erina Honda (Japan) Nozomi Shimizu	14–21, 21–19, 14–21	(silver) Runner-up

BWF International Challenge tournament
BWF International Series tournament
