= Minatsu Mitani =

Japanese badminton player

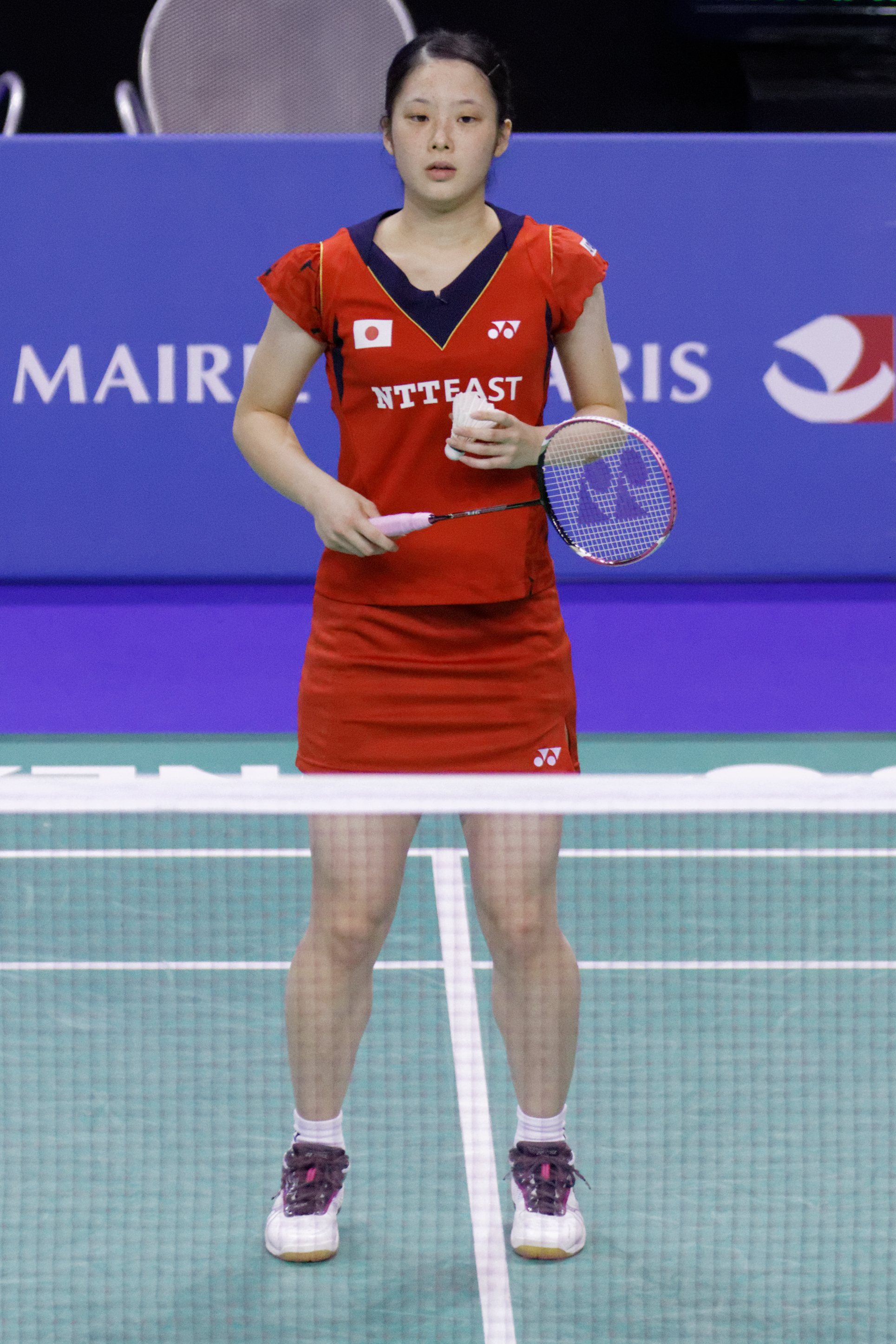
- Minatsu Mitani at the 2013 French Super Series

Personal information
- Born: 4 September 1991 (age 35) Ishikawa Prefecture, Japan
- Height: 1.61 m (5 ft 3 in)
- Weight: 54 kg (119 lb)

Sport
- Country: Japan
- Sport: Badminton
- Handedness: Right
- Retired: November 2019

Women's singles
- Highest ranking: 9 (24 October 2013)
- BWF profile
Medal record
Women's badminton
Representing Japan
World Championships
Bronze medal – third place	2014 Copenhagen	Women's singles
Sudirman Cup
Silver medal – second place	2015 Dongguan	Mixed team
Uber Cup
Silver medal – second place	2014 New Delhi	Women's team
Bronze medal – third place	2012 Wuhan	Women's team
Asian Games
Bronze medal – third place	2014 Incheon	Women's team
Asia Team Championships
Silver medal – second place	2016 Hyderabad	Women's team
Asian Junior Championships
Bronze medal – third place	2009 Kuala Lumpur	Mixed team

Minatsu Mitani (三谷 美菜津, Mitani Minatsu; born 4 September 1991) is a is a retired Japanese badminton player who competed in women's singles for NTT East and the Japan national team. She reached a career-high world ranking of No. 9.

Mitani won her first Superseries title at the 2012 French Open to become the first Japanese player to win a BWF Superseries singles title. At the 2014 World Championships in Copenhagen, she won the women's singles bronze medal, becoming the first Japanese women's singles player to win a World Championships medal in 37 years.

In team competition, Mitani was part of the Japanese teams that won silver medals at the 2014 Uber Cup, the 2015 Sudirman Cup, and the 2016 Asia Team Championships, as well as bronze medals at the 2012 Uber Cup and the 2014 Asian Games. Domestically, she won the women's singles title at the All Japan Championships in 2013. Mitani retired from competitive badminton at the end of 2019.

== Career ==
Mitani began playing badminton at an early age, influenced by her mother, who played the sport, and her older sister. She attended Mikawa Junior High School before enrolling at Kanazawa Koyo High School in Ishikawa Prefecture. Under the guidance of coach Hiroaki Kuruma at Kanazawa Koyo, she underwent rigorous multishuttle and endurance drills that significantly improved her court mobility. During high school, she won consecutive girls' singles titles at the National High School Selection Championships and also won the singles title at the Inter-High School Championships. Internationally, she was part of the Japanese team that won a bronze medal in the mixed team event at the 2009 Asian Junior Championships in Kuala Lumpur. After graduating from high school in 2010, Mitani joined the NTT East badminton team.

In 2010, Mitani reached her first senior international finals, finishing as runner-up in women's singles at the Australian Open Grand Prix and in women's doubles alongside Naoko Fukuman at the Austrian International. Domestically, she finished third in women's singles at the All Japan Championships at the end of the year and was subsequently selected to the Japanese national A team for 2011. Throughout 2011, Mitani won three singles titles on the international circuit: the Banuinvest International, the Croatian International, and the Osaka International.

Mitani emerged as a key member of the Japanese national team in 2012. In February, at the Asian Thomas and Uber Cup Preliminaries in Macau, she played as Japan's third singles player in the women's team final against China. With the tie level at 2–2, Mitani defeated 2010 world champion Wang Lin in the deciding rubber, giving Japan a 3–2 victory and the title. In May, she was part of the Japanese team that won a bronze medal at the Uber Cup in Wuhan.

In October 2012, Mitani entered the French Open as an unseeded player. She advanced to the final by defeating several established opponents, including Jiang Yanjiao, Tine Baun, and compatriot Eriko Hirose. In the final, Mitani defeated top seed and 2012 Olympic bronze medallist Saina Nehwal in straight games to win her first Superseries title. The victory made her the first Japanese player to win a BWF Superseries singles title.

Mitani reached a career-high world ranking of No. 9 in October 2013. In December, she won her first women's singles title at the All Japan Championships, defeating five-time champion Eriko Hirose in the final.

Mitani played first singles for Japan at the 2014 Uber Cup in New Delhi, helping the team reach the final for the first time since 1981. Along the way, she defeated Line Kjærsfeldt in the quarterfinal victory over Denmark, but lost to Saina Nehwal as Japan recovered from a 0–2 deficit to defeat hosts India in the semifinals. In the final, she was defeated by Olympic champion Li Xuerui as China beat Japan 3–1, leaving Japan with the silver medal.

At the 2014 World Championships in Copenhagen in August, Mitani upset defending champion and fourth seed Ratchanok Intanon in the third round, then defeated fifth seed Sung Ji-hyun in the quarterfinals. She lost to top seed and Olympic champion Li Xuerui in the semifinals, finishing with the bronze medal. This marked the first World Championships medal for a Japanese women's singles player since Hiroe Yuki won bronze at the inaugural 1977 edition, 37 years earlier. Later that year, Mitani was part of the Japanese women's team that won bronze at the 2014 Asian Games in Incheon.

In 2015, Mitani was part of Japan's squad at the Sudirman Cup in Dongguan, where the team reached the final for the first time, finishing runners-up to China. At the Japan Open in September, she defeated world No. 1 Saina Nehwal in straight games to reach the quarterfinals. Later that year, she reached the final of the Macau Open, finishing runner-up to P. V. Sindhu.

In 2016, Mitani was part of the Japanese team that finished runners-up at the inaugural Asia Team Championships in Hyderabad, losing 3–2 to China in the final. At the end of the year, she reached the semifinals of the All Japan Championships, where she lost to Akane Yamaguchi.

In 2018, Mitani won two titles on the newly introduced BWF World Tour. At the Spain Masters in September, she came from a game down to defeat Mia Blichfeldt in three games to win the Super 300 title. Later that month, she won the Super 100 Indonesia Masters, defeating compatriot Shiori Saito in the final.

Mitani was selected for Japan's national B team for the 2019 season but declined the place to continue competing domestically with NTT East. She announced her retirement in November 2019 after losing in the second round of the All Japan Championships, ending a ten-year playing career with NTT East. She remained with the company afterward to focus on corporate duties.

== Playing style ==
Mitani was known for her speed, footwork, endurance, and retrieving ability. Her high-school coach, Hiroaki Kuruma, recalled that she undertook extensive multishuttle, match practice, and physical training, which Mitani credited with improving her speed and stamina. Saina Nehwal also noted Mitani's court coverage and retrieving ability during their meetings in 2012.

A distinctive feature of Mitani's game was her unconventional high serve. The Indian Express described her service action as using an unusual grip and swing that resembled topspin, sending the shuttle high into the court, and noted that the serve's height, combined with arena drift and Mitani's shuttle placement, disrupted Nehwal's rhythm during the final of the 2012 French Open.

== Legacy ==
Mitani's international breakthrough came during the emergence of a new generation of Japanese women's singles players. Her victory at the 2012 French Open made her the first Japanese player to win a BWF Superseries singles title, and the Badminton World Federation subsequently identified her, alongside Nozomi Okuhara, among the young Japanese players emerging on the international stage. Two years later, her bronze medal at the 2014 World Championships was the first in women's singles for Japan since Hiroe Yuki in 1977.

Following Mitani's retirement announcement in 2019, Okuhara, who had played alongside her on the Japanese national team, spoke of the encouragement she had received from Mitani and said that she felt responsible for taking the lead as Japan's ace.

== Achievements ==
=== World Championships ===
Women's singles
Year	Venue	Opponent	Score	Result	Ref.
2014	Ballerup Super Arena; Copenhagen, Denmark	(China) Li Xuerui	8–21, 14–21	Bronze	

=== BWF World Tour (2 titles) ===
The BWF World Tour, which was announced on 19 March 2017 and implemented in 2018, is a series of elite badminton tournaments sanctioned by the Badminton World Federation (BWF). The BWF World Tours are divided into levels of World Tour Finals, Super 1000, Super 750, Super 500, Super 300 (part of the HSBC World Tour), and the BWF Tour Super 100.

Women's singles
Year	Tournament	Level	Opponent	Score	Result	Ref.
2018	Spain Masters	Super 300	(Denmark) Mia Blichfeldt	9–21, 23–21, 21–8	(gold) Winner	
2018	Indonesia Masters	Super 100	(Japan) Shiori Saito	21–16, 21–12	(gold) Winner	

=== BWF Superseries ===
The BWF Superseries, which was launched on 14 December 2006 and implemented in 2007, is a series of elite badminton tournaments, sanctioned by the Badminton World Federation (BWF). BWF Superseries levels are Superseries and Superseries Premier. A season of Superseries consists of twelve tournaments around the world that have been introduced since 2011. Successful players are invited to the Superseries Finals, which are held at the end of each year.

Women's singles
Year	Tournament	Opponent	Score	Result	Ref.
2012	French Open	(India) Saina Nehwal	21–19, 21–11	(gold) Winner	

BWF Super Series tournament

=== BWF Grand Prix ===
The BWF Grand Prix had two levels, the BWF Grand Prix and Grand Prix Gold. It was a series of badminton tournaments sanctioned by the Badminton World Federation (BWF) which was held from 2007 to 2017.

Women's singles
Year	Tournament	Opponent	Score	Result	Ref.
2010	Australian Open	(South Korea) Seo Yoon-hee	20–22, 21–14, 19–21	(silver) Runner-up	
2015	Macau Open	(India) P. V. Sindhu	22–24, 11–21	(silver) Runner-up	

BWF Grand Prix Gold tournament
BWF Grand Prix tournament

=== BWF International Challenge/Series ===
Women's singles
Year	Tournament	Opponent	Score	Result	Ref.
2011	Banuinvest International	(Japan) Yui Hashimoto	21–14, 21–16	(gold) Winner	
2011	Croatian International	(France) Perrine Le Buhanic	21–14, 21–17	(gold) Winner	
2011	Osaka International	(Japan) Megumi Taruno	21–10, 21–10	(gold) Winner	

Women's doubles
Year	Tournament	Partner	Opponent	Score	Result	Ref.
2010	Austrian International	(Japan) Naoko Fukuman	(Japan) Rie Eto (Japan) Yu Wakita	14–21, 10–21	(silver) Runner-up	

BWF International Challenge tournament
BWF International Series tournament

== Record against selected opponents ==
Record against year-end Finals finalists, World Championships semi-finalists, and Olympic quarter-finalists. Accurate as of 20 August 2019.

Player	M	W	L	Diff.
(Bulgaria) Petya Nedelcheva	1	1	0	+1
(China) Chen Yufei	1	1	0	+1
(China) He Bingjiao	3	2	1	+1
(China) Li Xuerui	10	0	10	–10
(China) Wang Lin	2	2	0	+2
(China) Wang Shixian	8	1	7	–6
(China) Wang Xin	1	1	0	+1
(China) Wang Yihan	7	1	6	–5
(Chinese Taipei) Cheng Shao-chieh	1	0	1	–1
(Chinese Taipei) Tai Tzu-ying	8	3	5	–2
(Denmark) Tine Baun	2	2	0	+2
(France) Pi Hongyan	1	0	1	–1

Player	M	W	L	Diff.
(Germany) Juliane Schenk	2	2	0	+2
(Hong Kong) Yip Pui Yin	3	2	1	+1
(India) Saina Nehwal	10	4	6	–2
(India) P. V. Sindhu	5	2	3	–1
(Indonesia) Lindaweni Fanetri	6	3	3	0
(Japan) Nozomi Okuhara	4	0	4	–4
(Japan) Akane Yamaguchi	2	0	2	–2
(South Korea) Bae Yeon-ju	6	3	3	0
(South Korea) Sung Ji-hyun	8	1	7	–6
(Spain) Carolina Marín	7	0	7	–7
(Thailand) Porntip Buranaprasertsuk	7	4	3	+1
(Thailand) Ratchanok Intanon	8	1	7	–6
