= Chen Xiaojia (badminton) =

Chinese badminton player

Chen Xiaojia 陈晓佳
Personal information
- Born: 20 October 1991 (age 35) Xiangtan, Hunan, China
- Height: 1.70 m (5 ft 7 in)

Sport
- Country: China
- Sport: Badminton
- Handedness: Right

Women's singles
- Highest ranking: 22 (28 June 2012)
- BWF profile
Medal record
Women's badminton
Representing China
Asian Championships
| Bronze medal – third place | 2012 Qingdao | Women's singles |
East Asian Games
| Gold medal – first place | 2009 Hong Kong | Women's team |
| Bronze medal – third place | 2009 Hong Kong | Women's singles |
World Junior Championships
| Gold medal – first place | 2008 Pune | Mixed team |
| Gold medal – first place | 2009 Alor Setar | Mixed team |
| Bronze medal – third place | 2009 Alor Setar | Girls' singles |
Asian Junior Championships
| Gold medal – first place | 2008 Kuala Lumpur | Mixed team |
| Gold medal – first place | 2009 Kuala Lumpur | Girls' singles |
| Silver medal – second place | 2009 Kuala Lumpur | Mixed team |

Chen Xiaojia (Chinese: 陈晓佳; pinyin: Chén Xiǎojiā; born 20 October 1991) is a retired Chinese badminton player from Xiangtan, Hunan. She was selected to join the national second team in 2008. Chen was the gold medalist at the 2009 Asian Junior Championships and the bronze medalist at the World Junior Championships, She represented China at the 2009 East Asian Games, and claimed the gold medal in the women's team event, and a bronze medal in the women's singles. Chen clinched the women's singles title at the 2011 Indonesia Open Grand Prix Gold by beating the French veteran, Pi Hongyan, in a rubber game.

== Achievements ==
=== Asian Championships ===
Women's singles
| Year | Venue | Opponent | Score | Result |
|---|---|---|---|---|
| 2012 | Qingdao Sports Centre Conson Stadium; Qingdao, China | (China) Li Xuerui | 15–21, 20–22 | Bronze |

=== East Asian Games ===
Women's singles
| Year | Venue | Opponent | Score | Result |
|---|---|---|---|---|
| 2009 | Queen Elizabeth Stadium, Hong Kong | (Hong Kong) Zhou Mi | 13–21, 21–14, 16–21 | Bronze |

=== BWF World Junior Championships ===
Girls' singles
| Year | Venue | Opponent | Score | Result |
|---|---|---|---|---|
| 2009 | Stadium Sultan Abdul Halim; Alor Setar, Malaysia | (Thailand) Porntip Buranaprasertsuk | 21–18, 18–21, 19–21 | Bronze |

=== Asian Junior Championships ===
Girls' singles
| Year | Venue | Opponent | Score | Result |
|---|---|---|---|---|
| 2009 | Stadium Juara; Kuala Lumpur, Malaysia | (Chinese Taipei) Tai Tzu-ying | 21–13, 21–13 | Gold |

=== BWF Grand Prix ===
The BWF Grand Prix has two levels, the BWF Grand Prix and Grand Prix Gold. It is a series of badminton tournaments sanctioned by the Badminton World Federation (BWF) since 2007.

Women's singles
| Year | Tournament | Opponent | Score | Result |
|---|---|---|---|---|
| 2011 | Russian Open | (China) Lu Lan | 22–20, 15–21, 21–23 | (silver) Runner-up |
| 2011 | Indonesia Grand Prix Gold | (France) Pi Hongyan | 19–21, 21–15, 21–17 | (gold) Winner |

BWF Grand Prix Gold tournament
BWF Grand Prix tournament
