= Tatsuya Watanabe =

Japanese badminton player (born 1991)

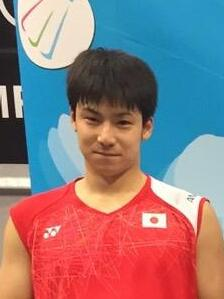
- Watanabe in 2017

Personal information
- Born: 18 June 1991 (age 35) Saito, Miyazaki Prefecture, Japan
- Height: 1.75 m (5 ft 9 in)
- Weight: 73 kg (161 lb)

Sport
- Country: Japan
- Sport: Badminton

Men's singles & doubles
- Highest ranking: 221 (MS) 16 October 2014; 111 (MD) 28 October 2010
- BWF profile
Medal record
Badminton
Representing Japan
World Junior Championships
Bronze medal – third place	2009 Alor Setar	Boys' singles
Asian Junior Championships
Bronze medal – third place	2009 Kuala Lumpur	Mixed team

Tatsuya Watanabe (渡邊 達哉, Watanabe Tatsuya; born 18 June 1991) is a Japanese former badminton player who is currently a women's single coach for the Saishunkan Pharmaceutical.

== Career ==
=== Playing career ===
Watanabe competed in both singles and doubles events on the international circuit. As a junior, he won a bronze medal in boys' singles at the 2009 World Junior Championships. During his senior career, he finished as the runner-up in men's singles at the 2013 USA International. In men's doubles, he reached the finals of the 2011 Osaka International with partner Shu Wada and the 2017 Finnish Open with Kohei Gondo.

=== Coaching career ===
Following his retirement from competition, in July 2018 Watanabe joined the Saishunkan Pharmaceutical badminton team as the women's singles coach, training players such as Akane Yamaguchi, Riko Gunji and Hina Akechi.

== Achievements ==
=== World Junior Championships ===
Boys' Singles
Year	Venue	Opponent	Score	Result	Ref.
2009	Stadium Sultan Abdul Halim; Alor Setar, Malaysia	(China) Tian Houwei	20–22, 13–21	Bronze	

=== BWF International Challenge/Series ===
Men's Singles
Year	Tournament	Opponent	Score	Result	Ref.
2013	USA International	(United States) Hock Lai Lee	19–21, 14–21	(silver) Runner-up	

Men's Doubles
Year	Tournament	Partner	Opponent	Score	Result	Ref.
2011	Osaka International	(Japan) Shu Wada	(Japan) Takatoshi Kurose (Japan) Keigo Sonoda	14–21, 14–21	(silver) Runner-up	
2017	Finnish Open	(Japan) Kohei Gondo	(Chinese Taipei) Liao Min-chun (Chinese Taipei) Su Cheng-heng	16–21, 16–21	(silver) Runner-up	

BWF International Challenge tournament
