= Ng Hui Ern =

Malaysian badminton player

Ng Hui Ern 黄惠恩
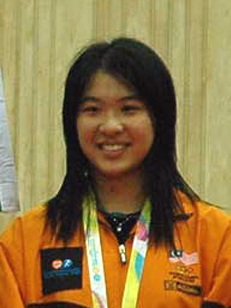

Personal information
- Born: 1 June 1991 (age 35) Kuala Lumpur, Malaysia
- Height: 1.58 m (5 ft 2 in)

Sport
- Country: Malaysia
- Sport: Badminton
- Handedness: Right

Women's doubles
- Highest ranking: 20 (9 January 2014)
- BWF profile
Medal record
Women's badminton
Representing Malaysia
World Junior Championships
Silver medal – second place	2009 Alor Setar	Mixed team
Commonwealth Youth Games
Bronze medal – third place	2008 Pune	Girls' doubles
Asian Junior Championships
Gold medal – first place	2009 Kuala Lumpur	Mixed team
Bronze medal – third place	2008 Kuala Lumpur	Mixed team
Bronze medal – third place	2009 Kuala Lumpur	Girls' doubles

Ng Hui Ern (born 1 June 1991) is a badminton player from Malaysia. She plays in the doubles event with her older sister Ng Hui Lin. She and her partner won three titles at the 2011–12 European Circuit tournament in Wales, Ireland and Austria. In 2014, Ng resigned from the Badminton Association of Malaysia.

== Achievements ==
=== Commonwealth Youth Games ===
Girls' doubles
Year	Venue	Partner	Opponent	Score	Result
2008	Shree Shiv Chhatrapati Sports Complex, Pune, India	(Malaysia) Lim Ee Von	(New Zealand) Jessica Jonggowisastro (New Zealand) Mary O'Connor	21–8, 21–19	Bronze

=== Asian Junior Championships ===
Girls' doubles
Year	Venue	Partner	Opponent	Score	Result
2009	Stadium Juara, Kuala Lumpur, Malaysia	(Malaysia) Lai Pei Jing	(China) Tang Jinhua (China) Xia Huan	25–23, 15–21, 15–21	Bronze

=== BWF Grand Prix ===
The BWF Grand Prix had two levels, the Grand Prix and Grand Prix Gold. It was a series of badminton tournaments sanctioned by the Badminton World Federation (BWF) and played between 2007 and 2017.

Women's doubles
Year	Tournament	Partner	Opponent	Score	Result
2010	Malaysia Grand Prix Gold	(Malaysia) Ng Hui Lin	(Thailand) Duanganong Aroonkesorn (Thailand) Kunchala Voravichitchaikul	21–12, 17–21, 13–21	(silver) Runner-up
2010	India Grand Prix	(Malaysia) Ng Hui Lin	(China) Tang Jinhua (China) Xia Huan	8–21, 19–21	(silver) Runner-up
2012	Vietnam Open	(Malaysia) Ng Hui Lin	(Indonesia) Pia Zebadiah Bernadet (Indonesia) Rizki Amelia Pradipta	17–21, 19–21	(silver) Runner-up
2013	Bitburger Open	(Malaysia) Ng Hui Lin	(Netherlands) Eefje Muskens (Netherlands) Selena Piek	20–22, 15–21	(silver) Runner-up
2013	Scottish Open	(Malaysia) Ng Hui Lin	(Netherlands) Eefje Muskens (Netherlands) Selena Piek	23–25, 21–15, 16–21	(silver) Runner-up

BWF Grand Prix Gold tournament
BWF Grand Prix tournament

=== BWF International Challenge/Series ===
Women's doubles
Year	Tournament	Partner	Opponent	Score	Result
2011	Scottish International	(Malaysia) Ng Hui Lin	(Sweden) Emelie Lennartsson (Sweden) Emma Wengberg	7–21, 13–21	(silver) Runner-up
2011	Welsh International	(Malaysia) Ng Hui Lin	(England) Alexandra Langley (England) Lauren Smith	21–16, 21–14	(gold) Winner
2011	Irish International	(Malaysia) Ng Hui Lin	(England) Mariana Agathangelou (England) Heather Olver	14–21, 21–16, 21–11	(gold) Winner
2012	Austrian International	(Malaysia) Ng Hui Lin	(United States) Eva Lee (United States) Paula Lynn Obañana	21–16, 21–18	(gold) Winner
2013	Irish Open	(Malaysia) Ng Hui Lin	(Netherlands) Eefje Muskens (Netherlands) Selena Piek	17–21, 10–21	(silver) Runner-up

Mixed doubles
Year	Tournament	Partner	Opponent	Score	Result
2011	Welsh International	(England) Peter Briggs	(Scotland) Martin Campbell (Malaysia) Ng Hui Lin	16–21, 19–21	(silver) Runner-up
2012	Singapore International	(Singapore) Chayut Triyachart	(Chinese Taipei) Tseng Min-hao (Chinese Taipei) Lai Chia-wen	16–21, 14–21	(silver) Runner-up

BWF International Challenge tournament
BWF International Series tournament
