= 2015 BWF Super Series =

Tournament details
- Dates: 3 March – 13 December
- Edition: 9th

The 2015 BWF Super Series, officially known as the 2015 Metlife BWF Super Series for sponsorship reasons, was the ninth season of the BWF Super Series.

== Schedule ==
Below is the schedule released by the Badminton World Federation:

| Tour | Official title | Venue | City | Date | | Prize money USD | Report |
| Tour | Official title | Venue | City | Start | Finish | Prize money USD | Report |
|---|---|---|---|---|---|---|---|
| 1 | All England Super Series Premier | Arena Birmingham | Birmingham | March 3 | March 8 | 500,000 | Report |
| 2 | India Open Super Series | Siri Fort Sports Complex | New Delhi | March 24 | March 29 | 300,000 | Report |
| 3 | Malaysia Open Super Series Premier | Putra Indoor Stadium | Kuala Lumpur | March 31 | April 5 | 500,000 | Report |
| 4 | Singapore Super Series | Singapore Indoor Stadium | Singapore | April 7 | April 12 | 300,000 | Report |
| 5 | (Australia) Australian Super Series | Sydney Olympic Park | Sydney | May 26 | May 31 | 750,000 | Report |
| 6 | Indonesia Open Super Series Premier | Istora Senayan | Jakarta | June 2 | June 7 | 800,000 | Report |
| 7 | Japan Super Series | Tokyo Metropolitan Gymnasium | Tokyo | September 8 | September 13 | 275,000 | Report |
| 8 | (South Korea) Korea Open Super Series | SK Handball Stadium | Seoul | September 15 | September 20 | 600,000 | Report |
| 9 | Denmark Super Series Premier | Odense Sports Park | Odense | October 13 | October 18 | 650,000 | Report |
| 10 | (France) French Super Series | Stade Pierre de Coubertin | Paris | October 20 | October 25 | 275,000 | Report |
| 11 | China Open Super Series Premier | Haixia Olympic Sports Center | Fuzhou | November 10 | November 15 | 700,000 | Report |
| 12 | Hong Kong Super Series | Hong Kong Coliseum | Kowloon | November 17 | November 22 | 350,000 | Report |
| 13 | (United Arab Emirates) Super Series Masters Finals | Hamdan Sports Complex | Dubai | December 9 | December 13 | 1,000,000 | Report |

Super Series Premier
Super Series Finals

== Results ==
=== Winners ===
| Tour | Men's singles | Women's singles | Men's doubles | Women's doubles | Mixed doubles |
|---|---|---|---|---|---|
| England | (China) Chen Long | (Spain) Carolina Marín | (Denmark) Mathias Boe (Denmark) Carsten Mogensen | (China) Bao Yixin (China) Tang Yuanting | (China) Zhang Nan (China) Zhao Yunlei |
| India | (India) Srikanth Kidambi | (India) Saina Nehwal | (China) Chai Biao (China) Hong Wei | (Japan) Misaki Matsutomo (Japan) Ayaka Takahashi | (China) Liu Cheng (China) Bao Yixin |
| Malaysia | (China) Chen Long | (Spain) Carolina Marín | (Indonesia) Mohammad Ahsan (Indonesia) Hendra Setiawan | (China) Luo Ying (China) Luo Yu | (China) Zhang Nan (China) Zhao Yunlei |
| Singapore | (Japan) Kento Momota | (China) Sun Yu | (Indonesia) Angga Pratama (Indonesia) Ricky Karanda Suwardi | (China) Ou Dongni (China) Yu Xiaohan | (China) Zhang Nan (China) Zhao Yunlei |
| Australia | (China) Chen Long | (Spain) Carolina Marín | (South Korea) Lee Yong-dae (South Korea) Yoo Yeon-seong | (China) Ma Jin (China) Tang Yuanting | (Hong Kong) Lee Chun Hei (Hong Kong) Chau Hoi Wah |
| Indonesia | (Japan) Kento Momota | (Thailand) Ratchanok Intanon | (South Korea) Ko Sung-hyun (South Korea) Shin Baek-cheol | (China) Tang Jinhua (China) Tian Qing | (China) Xu Chen (China) Ma Jin |
| Japan | (China) Lin Dan | (Japan) Nozomi Okuhara | (South Korea) Lee Yong-dae (South Korea) Yoo Yeon-seong | (China) Zhao Yunlei (China) Zhong Qianxin | (Denmark) Joachim Fischer Nielsen (Denmark) Christinna Pedersen |
| Korea | (China) Chen Long | (South Korea) Sung Ji-hyun | (South Korea) Lee Yong-dae (South Korea) Yoo Yeon-seong | (Indonesia) Nitya Krishinda Maheswari (Indonesia) Greysia Polii | (China) Zhang Nan (China) Zhao Yunlei |
| Denmark | (China) Chen Long | (China) Li Xuerui | (South Korea) Lee Yong-dae (South Korea) Yoo Yeon-seong | (South Korea) Jung Kyung-eun (South Korea) Shin Seung-chan | (South Korea) Ko Sung-hyun (South Korea) Kim Ha-na |
| France | (Malaysia) Lee Chong Wei | (Spain) Carolina Marín | (South Korea) Lee Yong-dae (South Korea) Yoo Yeon-seong | (China) Huang Yaqiong (China) Tang Jinhua | (South Korea) Ko Sung-hyun (South Korea) Kim Ha-na |
| China | (Malaysia) Lee Chong Wei | (China) Li Xuerui | (South Korea) Kim Gi-jung (South Korea) Kim Sa-rang | (China) Tang Yuanting (China) Yu Yang | (China) Zhang Nan (China) Zhao Yunlei |
| Hong Kong | (Malaysia) Lee Chong Wei | (Spain) Carolina Marín | (South Korea) Lee Yong-dae (South Korea) Yoo Yeon-seong | (China) Tian Qing (China) Zhao Yunlei | (China) Zhang Nan (China) Zhao Yunlei |
| Masters Finals | (Japan) Kento Momota | (Japan) Nozomi Okuhara | (Indonesia) Mohammad Ahsan (Indonesia) Hendra Setiawan | (China) Luo Ying (China) Luo Yu | (England) Chris Adcock (England) Gabby Adcock |

=== Performance by countries ===
Tabulated below are the Super Series performances based on countries. Only countries who have won a title are listed:

| Team | ENG | IND | MAS | SIN | AUS | INA | JPN | KOR | DEN | FRA | CHN | HKG | SSF | Total |
|---|---|---|---|---|---|---|---|---|---|---|---|---|---|---|
| China | 3 | 2 | 3 | 3 | 2 | 2 | 2 | 2 | 2 | 1 | 3 | 2 | 1 | 28 |
| Korea | | | | | 1 | 1 | 1 | 2 | 3 | 2 | 1 | 1 | | 12 |
| Japan | | 1 | | 1 | | 1 | 1 | | | | | | 2 | 6 |
| Spain | 1 | | 1 | | 1 | | | | | 1 | | 1 | | 5 |
| Indonesia | | | 1 | 1 | | | | 1 | | | | | 1 | 4 |
| Malaysia | | | | | | | | | | 1 | 1 | 1 | | 3 |
| Denmark | 1 | | | | | | 1 | | | | | | | 2 |
| India | | 2 | | | | | | | | | | | | 2 |
| England | | | | | | | | | | | | | 1 | 1 |
| Hong Kong | | | | | 1 | | | | | | | | | 1 |
| Thailand | | | | | | 1 | | | | | | | | 1 |

== Finals ==
=== All England ===
| Category | Winners | Runners-up | Score |
|---|---|---|---|
| Men's singles | (China) Chen Long | (Denmark) Jan Ø. Jørgensen | 15–21, 21–17, 21–15 |
| Women's singles | (Spain) Carolina Marín | (India) Saina Nehwal | 16–21, 21–14, 21–7 |
| Men's doubles | (Denmark) Mathias Boe / Carsten Mogensen | (China) Fu Haifeng / Zhang Nan | 21–17, 22–20 |
| Women's doubles | (China) Bao Yixin / Tang Yuanting | (China) Wang Xiaoli / Yu Yang | 21–14, 21–14 |
| Mixed doubles | (China) Zhang Nan / Zhao Yunlei | (Indonesia) Tontowi Ahmad / Liliyana Natsir | 21–10, 21–10 |

=== India ===
| Category | Winners | Runners-up | Score |
|---|---|---|---|
| Men's singles | (India) Srikanth Kidambi | (Denmark) Viktor Axelsen | 18–21, 21–13, 21–12 |
| Women's singles | (India) Saina Nehwal | (Thailand) Ratchanok Intanon | 21–16, 21–14 |
| Men's doubles | (China) Chai Biao / Hong Wei | (Denmark) Mads Conrad-Petersen / Mads Pieler Kolding | 21–18, 21–14 |
| Women's doubles | (Japan) Misaki Matsutomo / Ayaka Takahashi | (China) Luo Ying / Luo Yu | 21–19, 21–19 |
| Mixed doubles | (China) Liu Cheng / Bao Yixin | (Denmark) Joachim Fischer Nielsen / Christinna Pedersen | 21–19, 21–19 |

=== Malaysia ===
| Category | Winners | Runners-up | Score |
|---|---|---|---|
| Men's singles | (China) Chen Long | (China) Lin Dan | 20–22, 21–13, 21–11 |
| Women's singles | (Spain) Carolina Marín | (China) Li Xuerui | 19–21, 21–19, 21–17 |
| Men's doubles | (Indonesia) Mohammad Ahsan / Hendra Setiawan | (South Korea) Lee Yong-dae / Yoo Yeon-seong | 14–21, 21–15, 23–21 |
| Women's doubles | (China) Luo Ying / Luo Yu | (South Korea) Chang Ye-na / Jung Kyung-eun | 21–18, 21–9 |
| Mixed doubles | (China) Zhang Nan / Zhao Yunlei | (China) Xu Chen / Ma Jin | 21–16, 21–14 |

=== Singapore ===
| Category | Winners | Runners-up | Score |
|---|---|---|---|
| Men's singles | (Japan) Kento Momota | (Hong Kong) Hu Yun | 21–17, 16–21, 21–15 |
| Women's singles | (China) Sun Yu | (Chinese Taipei) Tai Tzu-ying | 21–13, 19–21, 22–20 |
| Men's doubles | (Indonesia) Angga Pratama / Ricky Karanda Suwardi | (China) Fu Haifeng / Zhang Nan | 21–15, 11–21, 21–14 |
| Women's doubles | (China) Ou Dongni / Yu Xiaohan | (Japan) Misaki Matsutomo / Ayaka Takahashi | 21–17, 21–16 |
| Mixed doubles | (China) Zhang Nan / Zhao Yunlei | (China) Lu Kai / Huang Yaqiong | walkover |

=== Australia ===
| Category | Winners | Runners-up | Score |
|---|---|---|---|
| Men's singles | (China) Chen Long | (Denmark) Viktor Axelsen | 21–12, 14–21, 21–18 |
| Women's singles | (Spain) Carolina Marín | (China) Wang Shixian | 22–20, 21–18 |
| Men's doubles | (South Korea) Lee Yong-dae / Yoo Yeon-seong | (China) Liu Cheng / Lu Kai | 21–16, 21–17 |
| Women's doubles | (China) Ma Jin / Tang Yuanting | (China) Tang Jinhua / Tian Qing | 21–19, 16–21, 22–20 |
| Mixed doubles | (Hong Kong) Lee Chun Hei / Chau Hoi Wah | (China) Liu Cheng / Bao Yixin | 21–19, 19–21, 21–15 |

=== Indonesia ===
| Category | Winners | Runners-up | Score |
|---|---|---|---|
| Men's singles | (Japan) Kento Momota | (Denmark) Jan Ø. Jørgensen | 16–21, 21–19, 21–7 |
| Women's singles | (Thailand) Ratchanok Intanon | (Japan) Yui Hashimoto | 21–11, 21–10 |
| Men's doubles | (South Korea) Ko Sung-hyun / Shin Baek-cheol | (China) Fu Haifeng / Zhang Nan | 21–16, 16–21, 21–19 |
| Women's doubles | (China) Tang Jinhua / Tian Qing | (Indonesia) Nitya Krishinda Maheswari / Greysia Polii | 21–11, 21–10 |
| Mixed doubles | (China) Xu Chen / Ma Jin | (China) Zhang Nan / Zhao Yunlei | 21–17, 21–16 |

=== Japan ===
| Category | Winners | Runners-up | Score |
|---|---|---|---|
| Men's singles | (China) Lin Dan | (Denmark) Viktor Axelsen | 21–19, 16–21, 21–19 |
| Women's singles | (Japan) Nozomi Okuhara | (Japan) Akane Yamaguchi | 21–18, 21–12 |
| Men's doubles | (South Korea) Lee Yong-dae / Yoo Yeon-seong | (China) Fu Haifeng / Zhang Nan | 21–19, 29–27 |
| Women's doubles | (China) Zhao Yunlei / Zhong Qianxin | (Denmark) Christinna Pedersen / Kamilla Rytter Juhl | 21–12, 21–16 |
| Mixed doubles | (Denmark) Joachim Fischer Nielsen / Christinna Pedersen | (China) Zhang Nan / Zhao Yunlei | 17–21, 21–18, 23–21 |

=== Korea ===
| Category | Winners | Runners-up | Score |
|---|---|---|---|
| Men's singles | (China) Chen Long | (India) Ajay Jayaram | 21–14, 21–13 |
| Women's singles | (South Korea) Sung Ji-hyun | (China) Wang Yihan | 21–14, 17–21, 21–18 |
| Men's doubles | (South Korea) Lee Yong-dae / Yoo Yeon-seong | (South Korea) Kim Gi-jung / Kim Sa-rang | 21–16, 21–12 |
| Women's doubles | (Indonesia) Nitya Krishinda Maheswari / Greysia Polii | (South Korea) Chang Ye-na / Lee So-hee | 21–15, 21–18 |
| Mixed doubles | (China) Zhang Nan / Zhao Yunlei | (Indonesia) Tontowi Ahmad / Liliyana Natsir | 21–16, 21–15 |

=== Denmark ===
| Category | Winners | Runners-up | Score |
|---|---|---|---|
| Men's singles | (China) Chen Long | (Indonesia) Tommy Sugiarto | 21–12, 21–12 |
| Women's singles | (China) Li Xuerui | (India) P. V. Sindhu | 21–19, 21–12 |
| Men's doubles | (South Korea) Lee Yong-dae / Yoo Yeon-seong | (China) Liu Cheng / Lu Kai | 21–8, 21–14 |
| Women's doubles | (South Korea) Jung Kyung-eun / Shin Seung-chan | (China) Tian Qing / Zhao Yunlei | walkover |
| Mixed doubles | (South Korea) Ko Sung-hyun / Kim Ha-na | (Indonesia) Tontowi Ahmad / Liliyana Natsir | 20–22, 21–18, 21–9 |

=== France ===
| Category | Winners | Runners-up | Score |
|---|---|---|---|
| Men's singles | (Malaysia) Lee Chong Wei | (Chinese Taipei) Chou Tien-chen | 21–13, 21–18 |
| Women's singles | (Spain) Carolina Marín | (China) Wang Shixian | 21–18, 21–10 |
| Men's doubles | (South Korea) Lee Yong-dae / Yoo Yeon-seong | (Denmark) Mads Conrad-Petersen / Mads Pieler Kolding | 21–14, 21–19 |
| Women's doubles | (China) Huang Yaqiong / Tang Jinhua | (China) Luo Ying / Luo Yu | 21–13, 21–16 |
| Mixed doubles | (South Korea) Ko Sung-hyun / Kim Ha-na | (Indonesia) Praveen Jordan / Debby Susanto | 21–10, 15–21, 21–19 |

=== China ===
| Category | Winners | Runners-up | Score |
|---|---|---|---|
| Men's singles | (Malaysia) Lee Chong Wei | (China) Chen Long | 21–15, 21–11 |
| Women's singles | (China) Li Xuerui | (India) Saina Nehwal | 21–12, 21–15 |
| Men's doubles | (South Korea) Kim Gi-jung / Kim Sa-rang | (China) Chai Biao / Hong Wei | 21–13, 21–19 |
| Women's doubles | (China) Tang Yuanting / Yu Yang | (Japan) Misaki Matsutomo / Ayaka Takahashi | 18–21, 21–13, 21–12 |
| Mixed doubles | (China) Zhang Nan / Zhao Yunlei | (Denmark) Joachim Fischer Nielsen / Christinna Pedersen | 21–19, 17–21, 21–19 |

=== Hong Kong ===
| Category | Winners | Runners-up | Score |
|---|---|---|---|
| Men's singles | (Malaysia) Lee Chong Wei | (China) Tian Houwei | 21–16, 21–15 |
| Women's singles | (Spain) Carolina Marín | (Japan) Nozomi Okuhara | 21–17, 18–21, 22–20 |
| Men's doubles | (South Korea) Lee Yong-dae / Yoo Yeon-seong | (Denmark) Mathias Boe / Carsten Mogensen | 21–7, 18–21, 21–18 |
| Women's doubles | (China) Tian Qing / Zhao Yunlei | (China) Tang Yuanting / Yu Yang | 21–15, 21–12 |
| Mixed doubles | (China) Zhang Nan / Zhao Yunlei | (China) Liu Cheng / Bao Yixin | 21–17, 17–21, 21–17 |

=== Masters Finals ===
| Category | Winners | Runners-up | Score |
|---|---|---|---|
| Men's singles | (Japan) Kento Momota | (Denmark) Viktor Axelsen | 21–15, 21–12 |
| Women's singles | (Japan) Nozomi Okuhara | (China) Wang Yihan | 22–20, 21–18 |
| Men's doubles | (Indonesia) Mohammad Ahsan / Hendra Setiawan | (China) Chai Biao / Hong Wei | 13–21, 21–14, 21–14 |
| Women's doubles | (China) Luo Ying / Luo Yu | (Denmark) Christinna Pedersen / Kamilla Rytter Juhl | 14–21, 21–9, 14–4 Retired |
| Mixed doubles | (England) Chris Adcock / Gabby Adcock | (South Korea) Ko Sung-hyun / Kim Ha-na | 21–14, 21–17 |
