= 2016 BWF Super Series Finals =

Tournament details
- Dates: 14 – 18 December 2016
- Level: International
- Total prize money: US$1,000,000
- Venue: Hamdan Sports Complex
- Location: Dubai, United Arab Emirates

Champions
- Men's singles: (Denmark) Viktor Axelsen
- Women's singles: (Chinese Taipei) Tai Tzu-ying
- Men's doubles: (Malaysia) Goh V Shem (Malaysia) Tan Wee Kiong
- Women's doubles: (China) Chen Qingchen (China) Jia Yifan
- Mixed doubles: (China) Zheng Siwei (China) Chen Qingchen

The 2016 BWF Super Series Finals was the final competition of the 2016 BWF Super Series. It was held from December 14 to December 18 in Dubai, United Arab Emirates.

== Representatives by nation ==
Top Nations
Rank	Nation	MS	WS	MD	WD	XD	Total	Players
1	China	1	2	2	2	2	9	14^{§}
2	Denmark	2	0	2	1	1	6	9^{§}
3	Japan	0	1	1	2	1	5	9
4	South Korea	1	1	0	2	1	5	8
5	Indonesia	0	0	2	0	2	4	8
6	Malaysia	1	0	1	1	0	3	5
7	Hong Kong	2	0	0	0	0	2	2
8	England	0	0	0	0	1	1	2
9	Chinese Taipei	0	1	0	0	0	1	1
9	Germany	1	0	0	0	0	1	1
9	India	0	1	0	0	0	1	1
9	Spain	0	1	0	0	0	1	1
9	Thailand	0	1	0	0	0	1	1
Total		8	8	8	8	8	40	62

§: Chen Qingchen from China and Christinna Pedersen from Denmark were the players who played in two categories (women's doubles and mixed doubles).

== Performance by nation ==
Nation	Group Phase	Semifinal	Final	Winner
China	9	5	3	2
Denmark	6	5	1	1
Chinese Taipei	1	1	1	1
Malaysia	3	1	1	1
Japan	5	2	2	
South Korea	5	3	1	
England	1	1	1	
Indonesia	4	1		
India	1	1		
Hong Kong	2			
Germany	1			
Spain	1			
Thailand	1			

== Men's singles ==
=== Seeds ===
1. (Denmark) Jan Ø. Jørgensen
2. (South Korea) Son Wan-ho
3. (China) Tian Houwei
4. (Hong Kong) Ng Ka Long
5. (Denmark) Viktor Axelsen
6. (Germany) Marc Zwiebler
7. (Malaysia) Lee Chong Wei
8. (Hong Kong) Hu Yun

=== Withdrawn ===
1. (China) Chen Long (Wild Card as Olympic Gold Medallist 2016)

=== Group A ===
Athlete	Pts	Pld	W	L	SF	SA	PF	PA
(China) Tian Houwei	2	2	2	0	4	0	85	58
(Denmark) Jan Ø. Jørgensen	1	2	1	1	2	2	78	71
(Germany) Marc Zwiebler	0	2	0	2	0	4	50	84
(Hong Kong) Hu Yun	N/A	N/A	N/A	N/A	N/A	N/A	N/A	N/A

Date		Score		Set 1	Set 2	Set 3
14 Dec	(China) Tian Houwei	2–0	(Germany) Marc Zwiebler	21–15	21–7	
14 Dec	(Denmark) Jan Ø. Jørgensen	2–0	(Hong Kong) Hu Yun	21–8	21–5	
15 Dec	(Denmark) Jan Ø. Jørgensen	2–0	(Germany) Marc Zwiebler	21–18	21–10	
15 Dec	(China) Tian Houwei	2–1	(Hong Kong) Hu Yun	21–19	13–21	21–7
16 Dec	(Denmark) Jan Ø. Jørgensen	0–2	(China) Tian Houwei	16–21	20–22	
16 Dec	(Germany) Marc Zwiebler	retired	(Hong Kong) Hu Yun	21–10	18–10^{r}	

=== Group B ===
Athlete	Pts	Pld	W	L	SF	SA	PF	PA
(South Korea) Son Wan-ho	2	3	2	1	5	3	143	150
(Denmark) Viktor Axelsen	2	3	2	1	5	3	156	140
(Malaysia) Lee Chong Wei	1	3	1	2	3	4	123	133
(Hong Kong) Ng Ka Long	1	3	1	2	2	5	131	130

Date		Score		Set 1	Set 2	Set 3
14 Dec	(South Korea) Son Wan-ho	2–0	(Malaysia) Lee Chong Wei	21–10	21–16	
14 Dec	(Hong Kong) Ng Ka Long	0–2	(Denmark) Viktor Axelsen	13–21	17–21	
15 Dec	(Hong Kong) Ng Ka Long	0–2	(Malaysia) Lee Chong Wei	15–21	20–22	
15 Dec	(South Korea) Son Wan-ho	2–1	(Denmark) Viktor Axelsen	21–19	14–21	21–18
16 Dec	(South Korea) Son Wan-ho	1–2	(Hong Kong) Ng Ka Long	26–24	8–21	11–21
16 Dec	(Denmark) Viktor Axelsen	2–1	(Malaysia) Lee Chong Wei	14–21	21–14	21–19

=== Finals ===
Semifinals
3	(China) Tian Houwei	21	19	21
1	(Denmark) Jan Ø. Jørgensen	17	21	13
5	(Denmark) Viktor Axelsen	21	21
2	(South Korea) Son Wan-ho	17	19

Final
3	(China) Tian Houwei	14	21	17
5	(Denmark) Viktor Axelsen	21	6	21

== Women's singles ==
=== Seeds ===
1. (Chinese Taipei) Tai Tzu-ying
2. (Japan) Akane Yamaguchi
3. (China) Sun Yu
4. (South Korea) Sung Ji-hyun
5. (Thailand) Ratchanok Intanon
6. (China) He Bingjiao
7. (Spain) Carolina Marín
8. (India) Pusarla Venkata Sindhu

=== Group A ===
Athlete	Pts	Pld	W	L	SF	SA	PF	PA
(South Korea) Sung Ji-hyun	2	2	2	0	4	0	84	65
(Chinese Taipei) Tai Tzu-ying	1	2	1	1	2	2	74	71
(China) He Bingjiao	0	2	0	2	0	4	62	84
(Thailand) Ratchanok Intanon	N/A	N/A	N/A	N/A	N/A	N/A	N/A	N/A

Date		Score		Set 1	Set 2	Set 3
14 Dec	(South Korea) Sung Ji-hyun	2–0	(Thailand) Ratchanok Intanon	21–19	21–12	
14 Dec	(Chinese Taipei) Tai Tzu-ying	2–0	(China) He Bingjiao	21–16	21–13	
15 Dec	(South Korea) Sung Ji-hyun	2–0	(China) He Bingjiao	21–18	21–15	
15 Dec	(Chinese Taipei) Tai Tzu-ying	2–0	(Thailand) Ratchanok Intanon	21–12	21–14	
16 Dec	(Thailand) Ratchanok Intanon	retired	(China) He Bingjiao	19–21	11^{r}–10	
16 Dec	(Chinese Taipei) Tai Tzu-ying	0–2	(South Korea) Sung Ji-hyun	15–21	17–21	

=== Group B ===
Athlete	Pts	Pld	W	L	SF	SA	PF	PA
(China) Sun Yu	3	3	3	0	6	1	144	113
(India) P.V. Sindhu	2	3	2	1	4	3	128	116
(Japan) Akane Yamaguchi	1	3	1	2	4	5	145	163
(Spain) Carolina Marín	0	3	0	3	1	6	122	147

Date		Score		Set 1	Set 2	Set 3
14 Dec	(China) Sun Yu	2–0	(Spain) Carolina Marín	21–18	24–22	
14 Dec	(Japan) Akane Yamaguchi	1–2	(India) P.V. Sindhu	21–12	8–21	15–21
15 Dec	(China) Sun Yu	2–0	(India) P.V. Sindhu	21–15	21–17	
15 Dec	(Japan) Akane Yamaguchi	2–1	(Spain) Carolina Marín	18–21	21–17	21–14
16 Dec	(Japan) Akane Yamaguchi	1–2	(China) Sun Yu	21–15	10–21	10–21
16 Dec	(Spain) Carolina Marín	0–2	(India) P.V. Sindhu	17–21	13–21	

=== Finals ===
Semifinals
4	(South Korea) Sung Ji-hyun	21	18	21
8	(India) P.V. Sindhu	15	21	15
1	(Chinese Taipei) Tai Tzu-ying	21	21
3	(China) Sun Yu	19	19

Final
4	(South Korea) Sung Ji-hyun	14	13
1	(Chinese Taipei) Tai Tzu-ying	21	21

== Men's doubles ==
=== Seeds ===
1. (Japan) Takeshi Kamura / Keigo Sonoda
2. (Malaysia) Goh V Shem / Tan Wee Kiong
3. (China) Chai Biao / Hong Wei
4. (Indonesia) Marcus Fernaldi Gideon / Kevin Sanjaya Sukamuljo
5. (Indonesia) Angga Pratama / Ricky Karanda Suwardi
6. (China) Li Junhui / Liu Yuchen
7. (Denmark) Mads Conrad-Petersen / Mads Pieler Kolding
8. (Denmark) Mathias Boe / Carsten Mogensen

=== Withdrawn ===
1. (China) Fu Haifeng / Zhang Nan (Wild Card as Olympic Gold Medallist 2016)

=== Group A ===
Athlete	Pts	Pld	W	L	SF	SA	PF	PA
(Denmark) Mads Conrad-Petersen (Denmark) Mads Pieler Kolding	3	3	3	0	6	1	144	117
(Japan) Takeshi Kamura (Japan) Keigo Sonoda	2	3	2	1	4	2	116	100
(Indonesia) Marcus Fernaldi Gideon (Indonesia) Kevin Sanjaya Sukamuljo	1	3	1	2	2	5	124	137
(Indonesia) Angga Pratama (Indonesia) Ricky Karanda Suwardi	0	3	0	3	2	6	131	161

Date		Score		Set 1	Set 2	Set 3
14 Dec	(Indonesia) Marcus Fernaldi Gideon (Indonesia) Kevin Sanjaya Sukamuljo	2–1	(Indonesia) Angga Pratama (Indonesia) Ricky Karanda Suwardi	21–18	17–21	21–14
14 Dec	(Japan) Takeshi Kamura (Japan) Keigo Sonoda	0–2	(Denmark) Mads Conrad-Petersen (Denmark) Mads Pieler Kolding	15–21	17–21	
15 Dec	(Japan) Takeshi Kamura (Japan) Keigo Sonoda	2–0	(Indonesia) Angga Pratama (Indonesia) Ricky Karanda Suwardi	21–15	21–9	
15 Dec	(Indonesia) Marcus Fernaldi Gideon (Indonesia) Kevin Sanjaya Sukamuljo	0–2	(Denmark) Mads Conrad-Petersen (Denmark) Mads Pieler Kolding	12–21	19–21	
16 Dec	(Indonesia) Angga Pratama (Indonesia) Ricky Karanda Suwardi	1–2	(Denmark) Mads Conrad-Petersen (Denmark) Mads Pieler Kolding	15–21	21–18	18–21
16 Dec	(Japan) Takeshi Kamura (Japan) Keigo Sonoda	2–0	(Indonesia) Marcus Fernaldi Gideon (Indonesia) Kevin Sanjaya Sukamuljo	21–15	21–19	

=== Group B ===
Athlete	Pts	Pld	W	L	SF	SA	PF	PA
(Malaysia) Goh V Shem (Malaysia) Tan Wee Kiong	2	2	2	0	4	2	119	113
(China) Chai Biao (China) Hong Wei	1	2	1	1	3	3	112	113
(China) Li Junhui (China) Liu Yuchen	0	2	0	2	2	4	113	118
(Denmark) Mathias Boe (Denmark) Carsten Mogensen	N/A	N/A	N/A	N/A	N/A	N/A	N/A	N/A

Date		Score		Set 1	Set 2	Set 3
14 Dec	(China) Chai Biao (China) Hong Wei	2–1	(China) Li Junhui (China) Liu Yuchen	21–18	16–21	21–15
14 Dec	(Malaysia) Goh V Shem (Malaysia) Tan Wee Kiong	w/o	(Denmark) Mathias Boe (Denmark) Carsten Mogensen			
15 Dec	(China) Chai Biao (China) Hong Wei	w/o	(Denmark) Mathias Boe (Denmark) Carsten Mogensen			
15 Dec	(Malaysia) Goh V Shem (Malaysia) Tan Wee Kiong	2–1	(China) Li Junhui (China) Liu Yuchen	18–21	21–19	21–19
16 Dec	(Malaysia) Goh V Shem (Malaysia) Tan Wee Kiong	2–1	(China) Chai Biao (China) Hong Wei	16–21	21–13	22–20
16 Dec	(China) Li Junhui (China) Liu Yuchen	w/o	(Denmark) Mathias Boe (Denmark) Carsten Mogensen			

=== Finals ===
Semifinals
7	(Denmark) Mads Conrad-Petersen (Denmark) Mads Pieler Kolding	17	19
1	(Japan) Takeshi Kamura (Japan) Keigo Sonoda	21	21
3	(China) Chai Biao (China) Hong Wei	18	16
2	(Malaysia) Goh V Shem (Malaysia) Tan Wee Kiong	21	21

Final
1	(Japan) Takeshi Kamura (Japan) Keigo Sonoda	14	19
2	(Malaysia) Goh V Shem (Malaysia) Tan Wee Kiong	21	21

== Women's doubles ==
=== Seeds ===
1. (Japan) Misaki Matsutomo / Ayaka Takahashi
2. (Denmark) Christinna Pedersen / Kamilla Rytter Juhl
3. (South Korea) Jung Kyung-eun / Shin Seung-chan
4. (South Korea) Chang Ye-na / Lee So-hee
5. (Japan) Naoko Fukuman / Kurumi Yonao
6. (China) Luo Ying / Luo Yu
7. (China) Chen Qingchen / Jia Yifan
8. (Malaysia) Vivian Hoo / Woon Khe Wei

=== Withdrawn ===
1. (Indonesia) Nitya Krishinda Maheswari / Greysia Polii

=== Group A ===
Athlete	Pts	Pld	W	L	SF	SA	PF	PA
(Japan) Misaki Matsutomo (Japan) Ayaka Takahashi	3	3	3	0	6	0	126	88
(South Korea) Chang Ye-na (South Korea) Lee So-hee	2	3	2	1	4	2	116	100
(China) Luo Ying (China) Luo Yu	1	3	1	2	2	4	96	123
(Japan) Naoko Fukuman (Japan) Kurumi Yonao	0	3	0	3	0	6	101	128

Date		Score		Set 1	Set 2	Set 3
14 Dec	(South Korea) Chang Ye-na (South Korea) Lee So-hee	2–0	(China) Luo Ying (China) Luo Yu	21–19	21–15	
14 Dec	(Japan) Misaki Matsutomo (Japan) Ayaka Takahashi	2–0	(Japan) Naoko Fukuman (Japan) Kurumi Yonao	21–19	21–19	
15 Dec	(South Korea) Chang Ye-na (South Korea) Lee So-hee	2–0	(Japan) Naoko Fukuman (Japan) Kurumi Yonao	21–14	21–10	
15 Dec	(Japan) Misaki Matsutomo (Japan) Ayaka Takahashi	2–0	(China) Luo Ying (China) Luo Yu	21–7	21–11	
16 Dec	(Japan) Naoko Fukuman (Japan) Kurumi Yonao	0–2	(China) Luo Ying (China) Luo Yu	18–21	21–23	
16 Dec	(Japan) Misaki Matsutomo (Japan) Ayaka Takahashi	2–0	(South Korea) Chang Ye-na (South Korea) Lee So-hee	21–18	21–14	

=== Group B ===
Athlete	Pts	Pld	W	L	SF	SA	PF	PA
(China) Chen Qingchen (China) Jia Yifan	3	3	3	0	6	1	140	113
(Denmark) Kamilla Rytter Juhl (Denmark) Christinna Pedersen	2	3	2	1	5	3	140	136
(South Korea) Jung Kyung-eun (South Korea) Shin Seung-chan	1	3	1	2	3	4	129	129
(Malaysia) Vivian Hoo (Malaysia) Woon Khe Wei	0	3	0	3	0	6	95	126

Date		Score		Set 1	Set 2	Set 3
14 Dec	(Denmark) Kamilla Rytter Juhl (Denmark) Christinna Pedersen	2–0	(Malaysia) Vivian Hoo (Malaysia) Woon Khe Wei	21–7	21–17	
14 Dec	(South Korea) Jung Kyung-eun (South Korea) Shin Seung-chan	0–2	(China) Chen Qingchen (China) Jia Yifan	18–21	13–21	
15 Dec	(Denmark) Kamilla Rytter Juhl (Denmark) Christinna Pedersen	1–2	(China) Chen Qingchen (China) Jia Yifan	13–21	21–14	13–21
15 Dec	(South Korea) Jung Kyung-eun (South Korea) Shin Seung-chan	2–0	(Malaysia) Vivian Hoo (Malaysia) Woon Khe Wei	21–19	21–17	
16 Dec	(Denmark) Kamilla Rytter Juhl (Denmark) Christinna Pedersen	2–1	(South Korea) Jung Kyung-eun (South Korea) Shin Seung-chan	21–19	9–21	21–16
16 Dec	(China) Chen Qingchen (China) Jia Yifan	2–0	(Malaysia) Vivian Hoo (Malaysia) Woon Khe Wei	21–17	21–18	

=== Finals ===
Semifinals
1	(Japan) Misaki Matsutomo (Japan) Ayaka Takahashi	21	21
2	(Denmark) Kamilla Rytter Juhl (Denmark) Christinna Pedersen	12	11
4	(South Korea) Chang Ye-na (South Korea) Lee So-hee	21	20
7	(China) Chen Qingchen (China) Jia Yifan	23	22

Final
1	(Japan) Misaki Matsutomo (Japan) Ayaka Takahashi	15	21	17
7	(China) Chen Qingchen (China) Jia Yifan	21	13	21

== Mixed doubles ==
=== Seeds ===
1. (South Korea) Ko Sung-hyun / Kim Ha-na
2. (China) Lu Kai / Huang Yaqiong
3. (Denmark) Joachim Fischer Nielsen / Christinna Pedersen
4. (China) Zheng Siwei / Chen Qingchen
5. (Indonesia) Tontowi Ahmad / Liliyana Natsir
6. (Indonesia) Praveen Jordan / Debby Susanto
7. (England) Chris Adcock / Gabby Adcock
8. (Japan) Kenta Kazuno / Ayane Kurihara

=== Group A ===
Athlete	Pts	Pld	W	L	SF	SA	PF	PA
(Indonesia) Praveen Jordan (Indonesia) Debby Susanto	2	2	2	0	4	0	84	60
(Denmark) Joachim Fischer Nielsen (Denmark) Christinna Pedersen	1	2	1	1	2	3	96	95
(South Korea) Ko Sung-hyun (South Korea) Kim Ha-na	0	2	0	2	1	4	80	105
(Indonesia) Tontowi Ahmad (Indonesia) Liliyana Natsir	N/A	N/A	N/A	N/A	N/A	N/A	N/A	N/A

Date		Score		Set 1	Set 2	Set 3
14 Dec	(South Korea) Ko Sung-hyun (South Korea) Kim Ha-na	1–2	(Denmark) Joachim Fischer Nielsen (Denmark) Christinna Pedersen	14–21	23–21	16–21
14 Dec	(Indonesia) Tontowi Ahmad (Indonesia) Liliyana Natsir	0–2	(Indonesia) Praveen Jordan (Indonesia) Debby Susanto	11–21	12–21	
15 Dec	(South Korea) Ko Sung-hyun (South Korea) Kim Ha-na	0–2	(Indonesia) Praveen Jordan (Indonesia) Debby Susanto	12–21	15–21	
15 Dec	(Denmark) Joachim Fischer Nielsen (Denmark) Christinna Pedersen	retired	(Indonesia) Tontowi Ahmad (Indonesia) Liliyana Natsir	21–8	11–6^{r}	
16 Dec	(South Korea) Ko Sung-hyun (South Korea) Kim Ha-na	w/o	(Indonesia) Tontowi Ahmad (Indonesia) Liliyana Natsir			
16 Dec	(Denmark) Joachim Fischer Nielsen (Denmark) Christinna Pedersen	0–2	(Indonesia) Praveen Jordan (Indonesia) Debby Susanto	17–21	16–21	

=== Group B ===
Athlete	Pts	Pld	W	L	SF	SA	PF	PA
(China) Zheng Siwei (China) Chen Qingchen	3	3	3	0	6	1	139	120
(England) Chris Adcock (England) Gabby Adcock	2	3	2	1	4	2	121	107
(China) Lu Kai (China) Huang Yaqiong	1	3	1	2	3	4	136	131
(Japan) Kenta Kazuno (Japan) Ayane Kurihara	0	3	0	3	0	6	88	126

Date		Score		Set 1	Set 2	Set 3
14 Dec	(China) Lu Kai (China) Huang Yaqiong	1–2	(China) Zheng Siwei (China) Chen Qingchen	18–21	21–13	14–21
14 Dec	(England) Chris Adcock (England) Gabby Adcock	2–0	(Japan) Kenta Kazuno (Japan) Ayane Kurihara	21–15	21–9	
15 Dec	(China) Lu Kai (China) Huang Yaqiong	2–0	(Japan) Kenta Kazuno (Japan) Ayane Kurihara	21–12	21–19	
15 Dec	(China) Zheng Siwei (China) Chen Qingchen	2–0	(England) Chris Adcock (England) Gabby Adcock	21–17	21–17	
16 Dec	(China) Zheng Siwei (China) Chen Qingchen	2–0	(Japan) Kenta Kazuno (Japan) Ayane Kurihara	21–19	21–14	
16 Dec	(China) Lu Kai (China) Huang Yaqiong	0–2	(England) Chris Adcock (England) Gabby Adcock	22–24	19–21	

=== Finals ===
Semifinals
6	(Indonesia) Praveen Jordan (Indonesia) Debby Susanto	19	21	9
7	(England) Chris Adcock (England) Gabby Adcock	21	17	21
3	(Denmark) Joachim Fischer Nielsen (Denmark) Christinna Pedersen	14	18
4	(China) Zheng Siwei (China) Chen Qingchen	21	21

Final
7	(England) Chris Adcock (England) Gabby Adcock	12	12
4	(China) Zheng Siwei (China) Chen Qingchen	21	21

Preceded by 2015 BWF Super Series Finals	BWF Super Series Finals	Succeeded by 2017 BWF Super Series Finals
Preceded by 2016 Hong Kong Super Series	BWF Super Series; 2016 BWF Season	Succeeded by 2017 All England Super Series Premier
