= 2015 BWF Super Series Finals =

Tournament details
- Dates: 9 December 2015 – 13 December 2015
- Level: International
- Total prize money: US$1,000,000
- Venue: Hamdan Sports Complex
- Location: Dubai, United Arab Emirates

Champions
- Men's singles: (Japan) Kento Momota
- Women's singles: (Japan) Nozomi Okuhara
- Men's doubles: (Indonesia) Mohammad Ahsan (Indonesia) Hendra Setiawan
- Women's doubles: (China) Luo Ying (China) Luo Yu
- Mixed doubles: (England) Chris Adcock (England) Gabby Adcock

The 2015 BWF Super Series Finals is the final competition of the 2015 BWF Super Series. It will be held from December 9 to December 13 in Dubai, United Arab Emirates.

== Representatives by nation ==
Top Nations
Rank	Nation	MS	WS	MD	WD	XD	Total	Players
1	China	2	2	2	2	2	10	14^{§}
2	Denmark	2	0	2	1	1	6	9^{§}
3	South Korea	0	1	2	1	1	5	9
4	Japan	1	1	1	2	0	5	8
5	Indonesia	0	0	1	1	2	4	8
6	Hong Kong	1	0	0	0	1	2	3
7	Chinese Taipei	1	1	0	0	0	2	2
7	India	1	1	0	0	0	2	2
9	England	0	0	0	0	1	1	2
9	Netherlands	0	0	0	1	0	1	2
11	Spain	0	1	0	0	0	1	1
11	Thailand	0	1	0	0	0	1	1
Total		8	8	8	8	8	40	61

§: Zhang Nan from China was the only players who played in two categories (men's doubles and mixed doubles), while Zhao Yunlei from China and Christinna Pedersen from Denmark were the players who played in two categories (women's doubles and mixed doubles).

== Performance by nation ==
Nation	Group Phase	Semifinal	Final	Winner
Japan	5	3	2	2
China	10	4	3	1
Indonesia	4	3	1	1
England	1	1	1	1
Denmark	6	4	2	
South Korea	5	2	1	
Hong Kong	2	1		
Spain	1	1		
Thailand	1	1		
India	2			
Chinese Taipei	2			
Netherlands	1			

== Men's singles ==
=== Seeds ===
1. (China) Chen Long
2. (Japan) Kento Momota
3. (Denmark) Jan Ø. Jørgensen
4. (Denmark) Viktor Axelsen
5. (Chinese Taipei) Chou Tien-chen
6. (China) Tian Houwei
7. (Hong Kong) Hu Yun
8. (India) Srikanth Kidambi

=== Withdrawn ===
1. (China) Lin Dan

=== Group A ===
Athlete	Pts	Pld	W	L	SF	SA	PF	PA
(China) Chen Long	3	3	3	0	6	0	126	86
(Denmark) Jan Ø. Jørgensen	2	3	2	1	4	2	117	106
(China) Tian Houwei	1	3	1	2	2	4	101	113
(Hong Kong) Hu Yun	0	3	0	3	0	6	89	128

Date		Score		Set 1	Set 2	Set 3
9 Dec	(Denmark) Jan Ø. Jørgensen	2–0	(Hong Kong) Hu Yun	21–10	23–21	
9 Dec	(China) Chen Long	2–0	(China) Tian Houwei	21–13	21–13	
10 Dec	(Denmark) Jan Ø. Jørgensen	2–0	(China) Tian Houwei	21–17	21–16	
10 Dec	(China) Chen Long	2–0	(Hong Kong) Hu Yun	21–17	21–12	
11 Dec	(China) Tian Houwei	2–0	(Hong Kong) Hu Yun	21–19	21–10	
11 Dec	(China) Chen Long	2–0	(Denmark) Jan Ø. Jørgensen	21–14	21–17	

=== Group B ===
Athlete	Pts	Pld	W	L	SF	SA	PF	PA
(Japan) Kento Momota	3	3	3	0	6	1	145	111
(Denmark) Viktor Axelsen	2	3	2	1	5	2	135	116
(Chinese Taipei) Chou Tien-chen	1	3	1	2	2	4	100	114
(India) Srikanth Kidambi	0	3	0	3	0	6	87	126

Date		Score		Set 1	Set 2	Set 3
9 Dec	(Denmark) Viktor Axelsen	2–0	(Chinese Taipei) Chou Tien-chen	21–8	21–16	
9 Dec	(Japan) Kento Momota	2–0	(India) Srikanth Kidambi	21–13	21–13	
10 Dec	(Denmark) Viktor Axelsen	2–0	(India) Srikanth Kidambi	21–13	21–18	
10 Dec	(Japan) Kento Momota	2–0	(Chinese Taipei) Chou Tien-chen	21–15	21–19	
11 Dec	(Chinese Taipei) Chou Tien-chen	2–0	(India) Srikanth Kidambi	21–17	21–13	
11 Dec	(Japan) Kento Momota	2–1	(Denmark) Viktor Axelsen	19–21	21–15	21–15

=== Finals ===
Semifinals
1	(China) Chen Long	12	17
4	(Denmark) Viktor Axelsen	21	21
3	(Denmark) Jan Ø. Jørgensen	19	18
2	(Japan) Kento Momota	21	21

Final
4	(Denmark) Viktor Axelsen	15	12
2	(Japan) Kento Momota	21	21

== Women's singles ==
=== Seeds ===
1. (Spain) Carolina Marín
2. (China) Wang Shixian
3. (China) Wang Yihan
4. (Japan) Nozomi Okuhara
5. (India) Saina Nehwal
6. (Chinese Taipei) Tai Tzu-ying
7. (Thailand) Ratchanok Intanon
8. (South Korea) Sung Ji-hyun

=== Group A ===
Athlete	Pts	Pld	W	L	SF	SA	PF	PA
(Japan) Nozomi Okuhara	3	3	3	0	6	0	126	71
(Spain) Carolina Marín	1	3	1	2	3	4	120	120
(India) Saina Nehwal	1	3	1	2	3	5	126	154
(Chinese Taipei) Tai Tzu-ying	1	3	1	2	2	5	110	137

Date		Score		Set 1	Set 2	Set 3
9 Dec	(Spain) Carolina Marín	2–0	(Chinese Taipei) Tai Tzu-ying	21–16	21–9	
9 Dec	(Japan) Nozomi Okuhara	2–0	(India) Saina Nehwal	21–14	21–6	
10 Dec	(Japan) Nozomi Okuhara	2–0	(Chinese Taipei) Tai Tzu-ying	21–11	21–16	
10 Dec	(Spain) Carolina Marín	1–2	(India) Saina Nehwal	21–23	21–9	12–21
11 Dec	(Spain) Carolina Marín	0–2	(Japan) Nozomi Okuhara	9–21	15–21	
11 Dec	(India) Saina Nehwal	1–2	(Chinese Taipei) Tai Tzu-ying	21–16	18–21	14–21

=== Group B ===
Athlete	Pts	Pld	W	L	SF	SA	PF	PA
(China) Wang Yihan	2	3	2	1	4	4	141	146
(Thailand) Ratchanok Intanon	2	3	2	1	5	3	156	150
(China) Wang Shixian	1	3	1	2	3	5	142	156
(South Korea) Sung Ji-hyun	1	3	1	2	4	4	157	144

Date		Score		Set 1	Set 2	Set 3
9 Dec	(Thailand) Ratchanok Intanon	2–1	(South Korea) Sung Ji-hyun	19–21	23–21	21–14
9 Dec	(China) Wang Shixian	1–2	(China) Wang Yihan	19–21	21–13	13–21
10 Dec	(China) Wang Yihan	2–1	(Thailand) Ratchanok Intanon	19–21	21–19	21–11
10 Dec	(China) Wang Shixian	2–1	(South Korea) Sung Ji-hyun	21–19	14–21	21–19
11 Dec	(China) Wang Shixian	0–2	(Thailand) Ratchanok Intanon	14–21	19–21	
11 Dec	(China) Wang Yihan	0–2	(South Korea) Sung Ji-hyun	14–21	11–21	

=== Finals ===
Semifinals
4	(Japan) Nozomi Okuhara	21	21
1	(Spain) Carolina Marin	11	12
7	(Thailand) Ratchanok Intanon	12	12
3	(China) Wang Yihan	21	21

Final
4	(Japan) Nozomi Okuhara	22	21
3	(China) Wang Yihan	20	18

== Men's doubles ==
=== Seeds ===
1. (South Korea) Lee Yong-dae / Yoo Yeon-seong
2. (Denmark) Mathias Boe / Carsten Mogensen
3. (Japan) Hiroyuki Endo / Kenichi Hayakawa
4. (China) Chai Biao / Hong Wei
5. (Indonesia) Mohammad Ahsan / Hendra Setiawan
6. (China) Fu Haifeng / Zhang Nan
7. (South Korea) Kim Gi-jung / Kim Sa-rang
8. (Denmark) Mads Conrad-Petersen / Mads Pieler Kolding

=== Group A ===
Athlete	Pts	Pld	W	L	SF	SA	PF	PA
(South Korea) Lee Yong-dae (South Korea) Yoo Yeon-seong	3	3	3	0	6	1	142	102
(Indonesia) Mohammad Ahsan (Indonesia) Hendra Setiawan	2	3	2	1	4	2	113	108
(China) Fu Haifeng (China) Zhang Nan	1	3	1	2	3	5	131	155
(Japan) Hiroyuki Endo (Japan) Kenichi Hayakawa	0	3	0	3	1	6	121	142

Date		Score		Set 1	Set 2	Set 3
9 Dec	(Japan) Hiroyuki Endo (Japan) Kenichi Hayakawa	0–2	(Indonesia) Mohammad Ahsan (Indonesia) Hendra Setiawan	17–21	19–21	
9 Dec	(South Korea) Lee Yong-dae (South Korea) Yoo Yeon-seong	2–1	(China) Fu Haifeng (China) Zhang Nan	16–21	21–10	21–12
10 Dec	(South Korea) Lee Yong-dae (South Korea) Yoo Yeon-seong	2–0	(Indonesia) Mohammad Ahsan (Indonesia) Hendra Setiawan	21–19	21–10	
10 Dec	(Japan) Hiroyuki Endo (Japan) Kenichi Hayakawa	1–2	(China) Fu Haifeng (China) Zhang Nan	18–21	21–16	16–21
11 Dec	(South Korea) Lee Yong-dae (South Korea) Yoo Yeon-seong	2–0	(Japan) Hiroyuki Endo (Japan) Kenichi Hayakawa	21–18	21–12	
11 Dec	(Indonesia) Mohammad Ahsan (Indonesia) Hendra Setiawan	2–0	(China) Fu Haifeng (China) Zhang Nan	21–14	21–16	

=== Group B ===
Athlete	Pts	Pld	W	L	SF	SA	PF	PA
(Denmark) Mathias Boe (Denmark) Carsten Mogensen	3	3	3	0	6	2	160	145
(China) Chai Biao (China) Hong Wei	2	3	2	1	4	4	151	147
(Denmark) Mads Conrad-Petersen (Denmark) Mads Pieler Kolding	1	3	1	2	4	5	154	171
(South Korea) Kim Gi-jung (South Korea) Kim Sa-rang	0	3	0	3	3	6	166	168

Date		Score		Set 1	Set 2	Set 3
9 Dec	(China) Chai Biao (China) Hong Wei	2–1	(South Korea) Kim Gi-jung (South Korea) Kim Sa-rang	21–15	12–21	24–22
9 Dec	(Denmark) Mathias Boe (Denmark) Carsten Mogensen	2–1	(Denmark) Mads Conrad-Petersen (Denmark) Mads Pieler Kolding	18–21	21–16	21–17
10 Dec	(China) Chai Biao (China) Hong Wei	2–1	(Denmark) Mads Conrad-Petersen (Denmark) Mads Pieler Kolding	15–21	21–13	21–13
10 Dec	(Denmark) Mathias Boe (Denmark) Carsten Mogensen	2–1	(South Korea) Kim Gi-jung (South Korea) Kim Sa-rang	21–18	16–21	21–15
11 Dec	(Denmark) Mathias Boe (Denmark) Carsten Mogensen	2–0	(China) Chai Biao (China) Hong Wei	21–18	21–19	
11 Dec	(South Korea) Kim Gi-jung (South Korea) Kim Sa-rang	1–2	(Denmark) Mads Conrad-Petersen (Denmark) Mads Pieler Kolding	21–11	19–21	14–21

=== Finals ===
Semifinals
1	(South Korea) Lee Yong-dae (South Korea) Yoo Yeon-seong	17	24	15
5	(Indonesia) Mohammad Ahsan (Indonesia) Hendra Setiawan	21	22	21
4	(China) Chai Biao (China) Hong Wei	17	21	24
2	(Denmark) Mathias Boe (Denmark) Carsten Mogensen	21	19	22

Final
5	(Indonesia) Mohammad Ahsan (Indonesia) Hendra Setiawan	13	21	21
4	(China) Chai Biao (China) Hong Wei	21	14	14

== Women's doubles ==
=== Seeds ===
1. (China) Luo Ying / Luo Yu
2. (Denmark) Christinna Pedersen / Kamilla Rytter Juhl
3. (Japan) Misaki Matsutomo / Ayaka Takahashi
4. (Indonesia) Nitya Krishinda Maheswari / Greysia Polii
5. (Netherlands) Eefje Muskens / Selena Piek
6. (South Korea) Chae Yoo-jung / Kim So-yeong
7. (Japan) Naoko Fukuman / Kurumi Yonao
8. (China) Tian Qing / Zhao Yunlei (Wild Card as 2015 World Champion)

=== Withdrawn ===
1. (Japan) Reika Kakiiwa / Miyuki Maeda

=== Group A ===
Athlete	Pts	Pld	W	L	SF	SA	PF	PA
(Japan) Misaki Matsutomo (Japan) Ayaka Takahashi	3	3	3	0	6	2	165	129
(China) Luo Ying (China) Luo Yu	2	3	2	1	5	2	133	119
(Japan) Naoko Fukuman (Japan) Kurumi Yonao	1	3	1	2	2	5	129	133
(South Korea) Chae Yoo-jung (South Korea) Kim So-yeong	0	3	0	3	2	6	113	159

Date		Score		Set 1	Set 2	Set 3
9 Dec	(China) Luo Ying (China) Luo Yu	2–0	(South Korea) Chae Yoo-jung (South Korea) Kim So-yeong	21–11	21–10	
9 Dec	(Japan) Misaki Matsutomo (Japan) Ayaka Takahashi	2–0	(Japan) Naoko Fukuman (Japan) Kurumi Yonao	21–16	22–20	
10 Dec	(China) Luo Ying (China) Luo Yu	2–0	(Japan) Naoko Fukuman (Japan) Kurumi Yonao	21–19	21–18	
10 Dec	(Japan) Misaki Matsutomo (Japan) Ayaka Takahashi	2–1	(South Korea) Chae Yoo-jung (South Korea) Kim So-yeong	19–21	21–11	21–12
11 Dec	(China) Luo Ying (China) Luo Yu	1–2	(Japan) Misaki Matsutomo (Japan) Ayaka Takahashi	21–19	18–21	10–21
11 Dec	(South Korea) Chae Yoo-jung (South Korea) Kim So-yeong	1–2	(Japan) Naoko Fukuman (Japan) Kurumi Yonao	13–21	21–14	14–21

=== Group B ===
Athlete	Pts	Pld	W	L	SF	SA	PF	PA
(Indonesia) Nitya Krishinda Maheswari (Indonesia) Greysia Polii	2	2	2	0	4	0	84	60
(Denmark) Christinna Pedersen (Denmark) Kamilla Rytter Juhl	1	2	1	1	2	2	72	73
(Netherlands) Eefje Muskens (Netherlands) Selena Piek	0	2	0	2	0	4	61	84
(China) Tian Qing (China) Zhao Yunlei	N/A	N/A	N/A	N/A	N/A	N/A	N/A	N/A

Date		Score		Set 1	Set 2	Set 3
9 Dec	(Indonesia) Nitya Krishinda Maheswari (Indonesia) Greysia Polii	2–0	(Netherlands) Eefje Muskens (Netherlands) Selena Piek	21–13	21–17	
9 Dec	(Denmark) Christinna Pedersen (Denmark) Kamilla Rytter Juhl	1–2	(China) Tian Qing (China) Zhao Yunlei	21–16	7–21	20–22
10 Dec	(Denmark) Christinna Pedersen (Denmark) Kamilla Rytter Juhl	2–0	(Netherlands) Eefje Muskens (Netherlands) Selena Piek	21–15	21–16	
10 Dec	(Indonesia) Nitya Krishinda Maheswari (Indonesia) Greysia Polii	2–1	(China) Tian Qing (China) Zhao Yunlei	21–17	14–21	21–16
11 Dec	(Denmark) Christinna Pedersen (Denmark) Kamilla Rytter Juhl	0–2	(Indonesia) Nitya Krishinda Maheswari (Indonesia) Greysia Polii	13–21	17–21	
11 Dec	(Netherlands) Eefje Muskens (Netherlands) Selena Piek	w/o	(China) Tian Qing (China) Zhao Yunlei			

=== Finals ===
Semifinals
3	(Japan) Misaki Matsutomo (Japan) Ayaka Takahashi	19	19
1	(China) Luo Ying (China) Luo Yu	21	21
2	(Denmark) Christinna Pedersen (Denmark) Kamilla Rytter Juhl	21	21
4	(Indonesia) Nitya Krishinda Maheswari (Indonesia) Greysia Polii	17	12

Final
1	(China) Luo Ying (China) Luo Yu	14	21	14
2	(Denmark) Christinna Pedersen (Denmark) Kamilla Rytter Juhl	21	9	4^{r}

== Mixed doubles ==
=== Seeds ===
1. (China) Zhang Nan / Zhao Yunlei
2. (China) Liu Cheng / Bao Yixin
3. (South Korea) Ko Sung-hyun / Kim Ha-na
4. (Indonesia) Tontowi Ahmad / Liliyana Natsir
5. (Denmark) Joachim Fischer Nielsen / Christinna Pedersen
6. (England) Chris Adcock / Gabby Adcock
7. (Indonesia) Praveen Jordan / Debby Susanto
8. (Hong Kong) Lee Chun Hei / Chau Hoi Wah

=== Group A ===
Athlete	Pts	Pld	W	L	SF	SA	PF	PA
(England) Chris Adcock (England) Gabby Adcock	2	2	2	0	4	2	120	113
(Hong Kong) Lee Chun Hei (Hong Kong) Chau Hoi Wah	1	2	1	1	3	2	101	89
(Indonesia) Tontowi Ahmad (Indonesia) Liliyana Natsir	0	2	0	2	1	4	85	104
(China) Zhang Nan (China) Zhao Yunlei	N/A	N/A	N/A	N/A	N/A	N/A	N/A	N/A

Date		Score		Set 1	Set 2	Set 3
9 Dec	(China) Zhang Nan (China) Zhao Yunlei	0–2	(Hong Kong) Lee Chun Hei (Hong Kong) Chau Hoi Wah	15–21	12–21	
9 Dec	(Indonesia) Tontowi Ahmad (Indonesia) Liliyana Natsir	1–2	(England) Chris Adcock (England) Gabby Adcock	21–17	11–21	22–24
10 Dec	(China) Zhang Nan (China) Zhao Yunlei	2–0	(England) Chris Adcock (England) Gabby Adcock	21–17	21–18	
10 Dec	(Indonesia) Tontowi Ahmad (Indonesia) Liliyana Natsir	0–2	(Hong Kong) Lee Chun Hei (Hong Kong) Chau Hoi Wah	14–21	17–21	
11 Dec	(China) Zhang Nan (China) Zhao Yunlei	w/o	(Indonesia) Tontowi Ahmad (Indonesia) Liliyana Natsir			
11 Dec	(England) Chris Adcock (England) Gabby Adcock	2–1	(Hong Kong) Lee Chun Hei (Hong Kong) Chau Hoi Wah	21–19	16–21	21–19

=== Group B ===
Athlete	Pts	Pld	W	L	SF	SA	PF	PA
(South Korea) Ko Sung-hyun (South Korea) Kim Ha-na	3	3	3	0	6	3	175	177
(Indonesia) Praveen Jordan (Indonesia) Debby Susanto	2	3	2	1	5	2	142	117
(China) Liu Cheng (China) Bao Yixin	1	3	1	2	3	5	151	147
(Denmark) Joachim Fischer Nielsen (Denmark) Christinna Pedersen	0	3	0	3	2	6	138	165

Date		Score		Set 1	Set 2	Set 3
9 Dec	(South Korea) Ko Sung-hyun (South Korea) Kim Ha-na	2–1	(Denmark) Joachim Fischer Nielsen (Denmark) Christinna Pedersen	19–21	21–19	24–22
9 Dec	(China) Liu Cheng (China) Bao Yixin	0–2	(Indonesia) Praveen Jordan (Indonesia) Debby Susanto	18–21	17–21	
10 Dec	(South Korea) Ko Sung-hyun (South Korea) Kim Ha-na	2–1	(Indonesia) Praveen Jordan (Indonesia) Debby Susanto	21–18	14–21	21–19
10 Dec	(China) Liu Cheng (China) Bao Yixin	2–1	(Denmark) Joachim Fischer Nielsen (Denmark) Christinna Pedersen	17–21	21–17	21–12
11 Dec	(Denmark) Joachim Fischer Nielsen (Denmark) Christinna Pedersen	0–2	(Indonesia) Praveen Jordan (Indonesia) Debby Susanto	8–21	18–21	
11 Dec	(China) Liu Cheng (China) Bao Yixin	1–2	(South Korea) Ko Sung-hyun (South Korea) Kim Ha-na	18–21	21–13	18–21

=== Finals ===
Semifinals
6	(England) Chris Adcock (England) Gabby Adcock	21	22
7	(Indonesia) Praveen Jordan (Indonesia) Debby Susanto	17	20
8	(Hong Kong) Lee Chun Hei (Hong Kong) Chau Hoi Wah	15	22	12
3	(South Korea) Ko Sung-hyun (South Korea) Kim Ha-na	21	20	21

Final
6	(England) Chris Adcock (England) Gabby Adcock	21	21
3	(South Korea) Ko Sung-hyun (South Korea) Kim Ha-na	14	17

Preceded by 2014 BWF Super Series Finals	BWF Super Series Finals	Succeeded by 2016 BWF Super Series Finals
Preceded by 2015 Hong Kong Super Series	BWF Super Series; 2015 BWF Season	Succeeded by 2016 All England Super Series Premier
