= 2015 Badminton Asia Championships =

Badminton championships

Badminton Asia Championships
- 2015

Tournament information
- Location: Wuhan, China
- Dates: April 21–April 26
- Venue: Wuhan Sports Center Gymnasium

The 2015 Badminton Asia Championships was the 34th edition of the Badminton Asia Championships. It was held in Wuhan, China, from April 21 to April 26.

== Venue ==
- Wuhan Sports Center Gymnasium

== Medalists ==
Event	Gold	Silver	Bronze
Men's singles	Lin Dan (CHN)	Tian Houwei (CHN)	Chen Long (CHN)
Men's singles	Lin Dan (CHN)	Tian Houwei (CHN)	Wang Zhengming (CHN)
Women's singles	Ratchanok Intanon (THA)	Li Xuerui (CHN)	Tai Tzu-ying (TPE)
Women's singles	Ratchanok Intanon (THA)	Li Xuerui (CHN)	Wang Yihan (CHN)
Men's doubles	Lee Yong-dae (KOR); Yoo Yeon-seong (KOR)	Mohammad Ahsan (INA); Hendra Setiawan (INA)	Cai Yun (CHN); Lu Kai (CHN)
Men's doubles	Lee Yong-dae (KOR); Yoo Yeon-seong (KOR)	Mohammad Ahsan (INA); Hendra Setiawan (INA)	Kim Gi-jung (KOR); Kim Sa-rang (KOR)
Women's doubles	Ma Jin (CHN); Tang Yuanting (CHN)	Wang Xiaoli (CHN); Yu Yang (CHN)	Misaki Matsutomo (JPN); Ayaka Takahashi (JPN)
Women's doubles	Ma Jin (CHN); Tang Yuanting (CHN)	Wang Xiaoli (CHN); Yu Yang (CHN)	Luo Ying (CHN); Luo Yu (CHN)
Mixed doubles	Tontowi Ahmad (INA); Liliyana Natsir (INA)	Lee Chun Hei (HKG); Chau Hoi Wah (HKG)	Xu Chen (CHN); Ma Jin (CHN)
Mixed doubles	Tontowi Ahmad (INA); Liliyana Natsir (INA)	Lee Chun Hei (HKG); Chau Hoi Wah (HKG)	Kenichi Hayakawa (JPN); Misaki Matsutomo (JPN)

== Medal table ==
Rank	Nation	Gold	Silver	Bronze	Total
1	China (CHN)	2	3	6	11
2	Indonesia (INA)	1	1	0	2
3	South Korea (KOR)	1	0	1	2
4	Thailand (THA)	1	0	0	1
5	Hong Kong (HKG)	0	1	0	1
6	Japan (JPN)	0	0	2	2
7	Chinese Taipei (TPE)	0	0	1	1
Totals (7 entries)		5	5	10	20

== Men's singles ==
=== Seeds ===
1. (China) Chen Long (Semi final)
2. (China) Lin Dan (champion)
3. (India) Srikanth Kidambi (withdrew)
4. (South Korea) Son Wan-ho (quarter-final)
5. (Chinese Taipei) Chou Tien-chen (quarter-final)
6. (Indonesia) Tommy Sugiarto (withdrew)
7. (China) Wang Zhengming (Semi final)
8. (Japan) Sho Sasaki (quarter-final)

=== Finals ===
Semifinals
1	(China) Chen Long	W	/	O
(China) Tian Houwei
7	(China) Wang Zhengming	14	17
2	(China) Lin Dan	21	21

Final
(China) Tian Houwei	19	8
2	(China) Lin Dan	21	21

=== Top half ===
==== Section 1 ====
First round
(Bahrain) H Setiawan	W	/	O
(Bangladesh) E H Chowdhury

Second round
1	(China) Chen L
(Pakistan) A Sarwar	W	/	O
(Iraq) Q Al-Mandalawi	W	/	O
(Nepal) R Tamang
5	(Chinese Taipei) Chou T-c	21	21
(Vietnam) Nguyen T M	19	15
(Turkmenistan) A Annanazarov	W	/	O
(Bangladesh) E H Chowdhury	W	/	O

Third round
1	(China) Chen L	21	21
(Nepal) R Tamang	7	15
5	(Chinese Taipei) Chou T-c
BYE

Quarterfinals
1	(China) Chen L	21	21
5	(Chinese Taipei) Chou T-c	10	11

==== Section 2 ====
First round
(Japan) K Momota	W	/	O
(Syria) A Ahmad
(South Korea) Lee D-k
(Thailand) T Saensomboonsuk	W	/	O

Second round
3	(India) Srikanth K.	W	/	O
(Uzbekistan) A Savatyugin
(Malaysia) Chong W F	21	21
(Syria) A Ahmad	7	12
6	(Indonesia) T Sugiarto	W	/	O
(China) Tian HW
(Hong Kong) Wei N	13	18
(South Korea) Lee D-k	21	21

Third round
(Uzbekistan) A Savatyugin	6	9
(Malaysia) Chong W F	21	21
(China) Tian HW	17	21	21
(South Korea) Lee D-k	21	8	11

Quarterfinals
(Malaysia) Chong W F	18	9
(China) Tian HW	21	21

=== Bottom half ===
==== Section 3 ====
First round
(Singapore) D Wong	17	13
(India) P Kashyap	21	21
(Indonesia) D H Rumbaka	21	21
(Hong Kong) Hu Y	13	11

Second round
(India) P Kashyap	15	21	21
(Chinese Taipei) Hsu J-h	21	18	19
(Thailand) B Ponsana	10	12
7	(China) Wang ZM	21	21
(Indonesia) D H Rumbaka	21	21
(Kazakhstan) A Niyazov	9	6
(Maldives) M A Rasheed	6	12
4	(South Korea) Son W-h	21	21

Third round
(India) P Kashyap	23	17	8
7	(China) Wang ZM	21	21	21
(Indonesia) D H Rumbaka	21	12	14
4	(South Korea) Son W-h	15	21	21

Quarterfinals
7	(China) Wang ZM	21	21
4	(South Korea) Son W-h	14	19

==== Section 4 ====
First round
(Brunei) J Yu W C	W	/	O
(Afghanistan) A S Iqbal	W	/	O

Second round
BYE
(Jordan) B A Alshannik
(India) Prannoy H.S.	W	/	O
8	(Japan) S Sasaki
(Philippines) A B Gadi	W	/	O
(Iran) F Khanjani
(Macau) U I I	3	6
2	(China) Lin D	21	21

Third round
(Jordan) B A Alshannik	W	/	O
8	(Japan) S Sasaki
(Iran) F Khanjani	9	7
2	(China) Lin D	21	21

Quarterfinals
8	(Japan) S Sasaki	17	13
2	(China) Lin D	21	21

== Women's singles ==
=== Seeds ===
1. (China) Li Xuerui (final)
2. (India) Saina Nehwal (quarter-final)
3. (China) Wang Shixian (third round)
4. (South Korea) Sung Ji-hyun (quarter-final)
5. (Chinese Taipei) Tai Tzu-ying (Semi final)
6. (China) Wang Yihan (Semi final)
7. (Thailand) Ratchanok Intanon (champion)
8. (India) Pusarla Venkata Sindhu (quarter-final)

=== Finals ===
Semifinals
1	(China) Li Xuerui	20	24	22
6	(China) Wang Yihan	22	22	20
7	(Thailand) Ratchanok Intanon	20	21	21
5	(Chinese Taipei) Tai Tzu-ying	22	9	12

Final
1	(China) Li Xuerui	22	21	12
7	(Thailand) Ratchanok Intanon	20	23	21

=== Top half ===
==== Section 1 ====
First round

Second round
1	(China) Li XR	21	11	21
(Vietnam) Vu T T	9	21	13
(Japan) M Mitani	16	22	21
(Chinese Taipei) Pai Y-p	21	20	11
8	(India) P.V. Sindhu	21	21
(Uzbekistan) A Khurshudyan	6	5
(Macau) U T I
(Pakistan) G Saddique	W	/	O

Third round
1	(China) Li XR	21	21
(Japan) M Mitani	8	17
8	(India) P.V. Sindhu	21	21
(Macau) U T I	8	9

Quarterfinals
1	(China) Li XR	11	21	21
8	(India) P.V. Sindhu	21	19	8

==== Section 2 ====
First round
(Thailand) N Jindapon
(Turkmenistan) Y Sarkisyan	W	/	O

Second round
4	(South Korea) Sung J-h	21	21
(Syria) S Mahmoud	8	9
(Jordan) M L Fehmi	W	/	O
(Malaysia) Tee J Y
6	(China) Wang YH	21	21
(Japan) A Yamaguchi	13	7
(Indonesia) M F Kusumastuti	18	21	21
(Thailand) N Jindapon	21	17	12

Third round
4	(South Korea) Sung J-h	21	21
(Malaysia) Tee J Y	8	11
6	(China) Wang YH	21	21
(Indonesia) M F Kusumastuti	14	9

Quarterfinals
4	(South Korea) Sung J-h	18	15
6	(China) Wang YH	21	21

=== Bottom half ===
==== Section 3 ====
First round
(Hong Kong) Yip P Y
(Bangladesh) B Khatun	W	/	O

Second round
(Hong Kong) Yip P Y	13	9
(Japan) S Takahashi	21	21
(Iraq) S Ghareeb	W	/	O
7	(Thailand) R Intanon
(Bahrain) S Prabhu	W	/	O
(South Korea) Bae Y-j
(Kazakhstan) I Filipchuk	2	12
3	(China) Wang SX	21	21

Third round
(Japan) S Takahashi	12	17
7	(Thailand) R Intanon	21	21
(South Korea) Bae Y-j	22	21
3	(China) Wang SX	20	11

Quarterfinals
7	(Thailand) R Intanon	21	21
(South Korea) Bae Y-j	13	9

==== Section 4 ====
First round

Second round
(China) Liu X	W	/	O
(Iran) S Aghaei
(Singapore) Chen JY	18	19
5	(Chinese Taipei) Tai T-y	21	21
(Nepal) N Tamang	W	/	O
(Japan) N Okuhara
(Philippines) M A Sevilla	W	/	O
2	(India) S Nehwal

Third round
(Iran) S Aghaei	8	11
5	(Chinese Taipei) Tai T-y	21	21
(Japan) N Okuhara	14	21	10
2	(India) S Nehwal	21	10	21

Quarterfinals
5	(Chinese Taipei) Tai T-y	16	21	21
2	(India) S Nehwal	21	13	18

== Men's doubles ==
=== Seeds ===
1. (South Korea) Lee Yong-dae / Yoo Yeon-seong (champion)
2. (Chinese Taipei) Lee Sheng-mu / Tsai Chia-hsin (second round)
3. (China) Liu Xiaolong / Qiu Zihan (quarter-final)
4. (Japan) Hiroyuki Endo / Kenichi Hayakawa (quarter-final)
5. (South Korea) Ko Sung-hyun / Shin Baek-cheol (withdrew)
6. (Indonesia) Mohammad Ahsan / Hendra Setiawan (final)
7. (China) Chai Biao / Hong Wei (quarter-final)
8. (China) Fu Haifeng / Zhang Nan (third round)

=== Finals ===
Semifinals
1	(South Korea) Lee Yong-dae (South Korea) Yoo Yeon-seong	21	21
(South Korea) Kim Ki-jung (South Korea) Kim Sa-rang	18	9
6	(Indonesia) Mohammad Ahsan (Indonesia) Hendra Setiawan	21	18	21
(China) Cai Yun (China) Lu Kai	12	21	16

Final
1	(South Korea) Lee Yong-dae (South Korea) Yoo Yeon-seong	18	24	21
6	(Indonesia) Mohammad Ahsan (Indonesia) Hendra Setiawan	21	22	19

=== Top half ===
==== Section 1 ====
First round

Second round
1	(South Korea) Lee Y-d (South Korea) Yoo Y-s
(Bahrain) J E Jafar (Bahrain) H Setiawan	W	/	O
(Iran) S Eskandari (Iran) H Mottaghi	W	/	O
(Indonesia) W Nayaka (Indonesia) A Yusuf
7	(China) Chai B (China) Hong W	21	21
(Uzbekistan) A Bakhshullaev (Uzbekistan) A Savatyugin	9	6
(Chinese Taipei) Huang P-j (Chinese Taipei) Lu C-y
(Pakistan) W A Chaudhry (Pakistan) A Saeed	W	/	O

Third round
1	(South Korea) Lee Y-d (South Korea) Yoo Y-s	21	21
(Indonesia) W Nayaka (Indonesia) A Yusuf	13	13
7	(China) Chai B (China) Hong W	21	21
(Chinese Taipei) Huang P-j (Chinese Taipei) Lu C-y	17	14

Quarterfinals
1	(South Korea) Lee Y-d (South Korea) Yoo Y-s	21	21
7	(China) Chai B (China) Hong W	10	14

==== Section 2 ====
First round

Second round
4	(Japan) H Endo (Japan) K Hayakawa	21	21
(India) P J Chopra (India) A Dewalker	15	17
(Kazakhstan) K Kulmatov (Kazakhstan) A Niyazov	17	10
(Hong Kong) Chan Y L (Hong Kong) Lee C H	21	21
8	(China) Fu HF (China) Zhang N	21	21
(Philippines) P G Magneye (Philippines) P J Vivas	8	10
(South Korea) Kim K-j (South Korea) Kim S-r	21	21
(Vietnam) Duong B D (Vietnam) Nguyen H N	15	11

Third round
4	(Japan) H Endo (Japan) K Hayakawa	21	18	21
(Hong Kong) Chan Y L (Hong Kong) Lee C H	19	21	8
8	(China) Fu HF (China) Zhang N	W	/	O
(South Korea) Kim K-j (South Korea) Kim S-r

Quarterfinals
4	(Japan) H Endo (Japan) K Hayakawa	16	15
(South Korea) Kim K-j (South Korea) Kim S-r	21	21

=== Bottom half ===
==== Section 3 ====
First round
(Bangladesh) M Hossain (Bangladesh) M Mohammad	W	/	O
(Jordan) A A Eleddin (Jordan) M N M Nayef	W	/	O

Second round
BYE
(Turkmenistan) A Annanazarov (Turkmenistan) P Sopyyev
(Maldives) M A Rasheed (Maldives) N Sharafuddeen	12	12
6	(Indonesia) M Ahsan (Indonesia) H Setiwan	21	21
(India) M Attri (India) S Reddy B
(Afghanistan) A S Iqbal (Afghanistan) A F Yari	W	/	O
(Japan) H Hashimoto (Japan) N Hirata	17	21	13
3	(China) Liu XL (China) Qiu ZH	21	18	21

Third round
(Turkmenistan) A Annanazarov (Turkmenistan) P Sopyyev	W	/	O
6	(Indonesia) M Ahsan (Indonesia) H Setiwan
(India) M Attri (India) S Reddy B	10	13
3	(China) Liu XL (China) Qiu ZH	21	21

Quarterfinals
6	(Indonesia) M Ahsan (Indonesia) H Setiwan	21	11	24
3	(China) Liu XL (China) Qiu ZH	18	21	22

==== Section 4 ====
First round

Second round
(Thailand) W Ampunsuwan (Thailand) P Chalardchaleam
(Iraq) M H Al-Qazzaz (Iraq) A H Al-Ogaili	W	/	O
(Japan) T Kamura (Japan) K Sonoda
5	(South Korea) Ko S-h (South Korea) Shin B-c	W	/	O
(Singapore) D B Chrisnanta (Singapore) C Triyachart
(Nepal) B Shrestha (Nepal) R Tamang	W	/	O
(China) Cai Y (China) Lu K	21	21
2	(Chinese Taipei) Lee S-m (Chinese Taipei) Tsai C-h	17	19

Third round
(Thailand) W Ampunsuwan (Thailand) P Chalardchaleam	14	13
(Japan) T Kamura (Japan) K Sonoda	21	21
(Singapore) D B Chrisnanta (Singapore) C Triyachart	17	9
(China) Cai Y (China) Lu K	21	21

Quarterfinals
(Japan) T Kamura (Japan) K Sonoda	13	21	21
(China) Cai Y (China) Lu K	21	17	23

== Women's doubles ==
=== Seeds ===
1. (Japan) Misaki Matsutomo / Ayaka Takahashi (Semi final)
2. (China) Luo Ying / Luo Yu (Semi final)
3. (Japan) Reika Kakiiwa / Miyuki Maeda (second round)
4. (China) Wang Xiaoli / Yu Yang (final)

=== Finals ===
Semifinals
1	(Japan) Misaki Matsutomo (Japan) Ayaka Takahashi	18	21	15
4	(China) Wang Xiaoli (China) Yu Yang	21	18	21
(China) Ma Jin (China) Tang Yuanting	21	0
2	(China) Luo Ying (China) Luo Yu	12	0^{r}

Final
4	(China) Wang Xiaoli (China) Yu Yang	12	12
(China) Ma Jin (China) Tang Yuanting	21	21

=== Top half ===
==== Section 1 ====
First round
1	(Japan) M Matsutomo (Japan) A Takahashi
BYE
(Chinese Taipei) Hsu Y-c (Chinese Taipei) Pai Y-p	21	15	21
(India) J Gutta (India) A Ponnappa	17	21	15
(South Korea) Lee S-h (South Korea) Shin S-c	21	21
(Malaysia) A A Anscelly (Malaysia) Soong F C	5	18
(Afghanistan) F Haidary (Afghanistan) S Rajabi	W	/	O
(China) Bao YX (China) Tang JH

Second round
1	(Japan) M Matsutomo (Japan) A Takahashi	21	21
(Chinese Taipei) Hsu Y-c (Chinese Taipei) Pai Y-p	11	13
(South Korea) Lee S-h (South Korea) Shin S-c
(China) Bao YX (China) Tang JH	W	/	O

Quarterfinals
1	(Japan) M Matsutomo (Japan) A Takahashi	21	21
(South Korea) Lee S-h (South Korea) Shin S-c	14	12

==== Section 2 ====
First round
4	(China) Wang XL (China) Yu Y
BYE
(Philippines) A A Montilla (Philippines) K D Salatan	W	/	O
(Indonesia) N K Maheswari (Indonesia) G Polii
(Uzbekistan) A Khurshudyan (Uzbekistan) V Mushtakova	7	3
(Singapore) V Neo Y Y (Singapore) S M Sari	21	21
(Iraq) I K R Al-Bayati (Iraq) A K Rashid	W	/	O
(Thailand) P Supajirakul (Thailand) S Taerattanachai

Second round
4	(China) Wang XL (China) Yu Y	21	21
(Indonesia) N K Maheswari (Indonesia) G Polii	14	9
(Singapore) V Neo Y Y (Singapore) S M Sari	15	17
(Thailand) P Supajirakul (Thailand) S Taerattanachai	21	21

Quarterfinals
4	(China) Wang XL (China) Yu Y	21	21
(Thailand) P Supajirakul (Thailand) S Taerattanachai	8	8

=== Bottom half ===
==== Section 3 ====
First round
(Thailand) D Aroonkesorn (Thailand) K Voravichitchaikul	W	/	O
(Bangladesh) A Shapla (Bangladesh) A Sultana
(Turkmenistan) A Klychkova (Turkmenistan) Y Sarkisyan	W	/	O
(Malaysia) V Hoo K M (Malaysia) Woon KW
(Vietnam) Nguyen T S (Vietnam) Vu T T	10	9
(China) Ma J (China) Tang YT	21	21
BYE
3	(Japan) R Kakiiwa (Japan) M Maeda

Second round
(Bangladesh) A Shapla (Bangladesh) A Sultana	W	/	O
(Malaysia) V Hoo K M (Malaysia) Woon KW
(China) Ma J (China) Tang YT	21	21
3	(Japan) R Kakiiwa (Japan) M Maeda	13	14

Quarterfinals
(Malaysia) V Hoo K M (Malaysia) Woon KW	11	15
(China) Ma J (China) Tang YT	21	21

==== Section 4 ====
First round
(Jordan) D Amro (Jordan) M L Fehmi	W	/	O
(Japan) S Matsuo (Japan) M Naito
(Nepal) N Tamang (Nepal) S D Tamang	W	/	O
(Iran) S Aghaei (Iran) N Amiripour
(Hong Kong) Chan T K (Hong Kong) Tse Y S	21	21
(South Korea) Go A-r (South Korea) Yoo H-w	17	11
BYE
2	(China) Luo Y (China) Luo Y

Second round
(Japan) S Matsuo (Japan) M Naito	21	21
(Iran) S Aghaei (Iran) N Amiripour	3	3
(Hong Kong) Chan T K (Hong Kong) Tse Y S	8	18
2	' (China) Luo Y (China) Luo Y	21	21

Quarter finals
(Japan) S Matsuo (Japan) M Naito	19	0^{r}
2	(China) Luo Y (China) Luo Y	21	0

== Mixed doubles ==
=== Seeds ===
1. (China) Zhang Nan / Zhao Yunlei (Quarter final, withdrew due to injury)
2. (Indonesia) Tantowi Ahmad / Lilyana Natsir (champion)
3. (China) Xu Chen / Ma Jin (Semi final)
4. (China) Liu Cheng / Bao Yixin (withdrew)

=== Finals ===
Semifinals
(Japan) Kenichi Hayakawa (Japan) Misaki Matsutomo	17	19
(Hong Kong) Lee Chun Hei (Hong Kong) Chau Hoi Wah	21	21
3	(China) Xu Chen (China) Ma Jin	12	15
2	(Indonesia) Tontowi Ahmad (Indonesia) Lilyana Natsir	21	21

Final
(Hong Kong) Lee Chun Hei (Hong Kong) Chau Hoi Wah	16	15
2	(Indonesia) Tontowi Ahmad (Indonesia) Lilyana Natsir	21	21

=== Top half ===
==== Section 1 ====
First round
1	(China) Zhang N (China) Zhao YL
BYE
(Uzbekistan) A Bakhshullaev (Uzbekistan) V Mushtakova	4	2
(Indonesia) R Widianto (Indonesia) R P Dili	21	21
(Japan) K Hayakawa (Japan) M Matsutomo
(Bangladesh) M Hossain (Bangladesh) B Khatun	W	/	O
(South Korea) Ko S-h (South Korea) Kim H-n	W	/	O
(Thailand) S Prakamol (Thailand) S Thoungthongkam	W	/	O

Second round
1	(China) Zhang N (China) Zhao YL	21	21
(Indonesia) R Widianto (Indonesia) R P Dili	16	15
(Japan) K Hayakawa (Japan) M Matsutomo
BYE

Quarterfinals
1	(China) Zhang N (China) Zhao YL	W	/	O
(Japan) K Hayakawa (Japan) M Matsutomo

==== Section 2 ====
First round
4	(China) Liu C (China) Bao YX
BYE
(Hong Kong) Lee C H (Hong Kong) Chau H W	21	21
(Macau) Wong C C (Macau) U T I	6	4
(Malaysia) Tan C T (Malaysia) Lai S J	21	15	18
(Chinese Taipei) Liao M-c (Chinese Taipei) Chen H-h	16	21	21
(Nepal) R Tamang (Nepal) S D Tamang	W	/	O
(Indonesia) P Jordan (Indonesia) D Susanto

Second round
4	(China) Liu C (China) Bao YX	W	/	O
(Hong Kong) Lee C H (Hong Kong) Chau H W
(Chinese Taipei) Liao M-c (Chinese Taipei) Chen H-h	22	18
(Indonesia) P Jordan (Indonesia) D Susanto	24	21

Quarterfinals
(Hong Kong) Lee C H (Hong Kong) Chau H W	14	21	22
(Indonesia) P Jordan (Indonesia) D Susanto	21	15	20

=== Bottom half ===
==== Section 3 ====
First round
(Kazakhstan) A Niyazov (Kazakhstan) I Filipchuk	9	3
(South Korea) Shin B-c (South Korea) Jang Y-n	21	21
(Malaysia) Wong F Y (Malaysia) Chow M K	16	20
(Thailand) N Puangpuapech (Thailand) P Supajirakul	21	22
(Philippines) P J Vivas (Philippines) J Francisco	W	/	O
(Vietnam) Dao M T (Vietnam) Pham N T
(Hong Kong) Chan Y L (Hong Kong) Tse Y S	15	17
3	(China) Xu C (China) Ma J	21	21

Second round
(South Korea) Shin B-c (South Korea) Jang Y-n	18	21	23
(Thailand) N Puangpuapech (Thailand) P Supajirakul	21	19	21
(Vietnam) Dao M T (Vietnam) Pham N T	7	6
3	(China) Xu C (China) Ma J	21	21

Quarterfinals
(South Korea) Shin B-c (South Korea) Jang Y-n	15	19
3	(China) Xu C (China) Ma J	21	21

==== Section 4 ====
First round
(India) A Vishnu (India) A Balan
(Bahrain) H Setiawan (Bahrain) R Sunder	W	/	O
(China) Lu K (China) Huang YQ	21	21
(Singapore) D B Chrisnanta (Singapore) V Neo Y Y	13	10
(Pakistan) M I S Bhatti (Pakistan) G Saddique	W	/	O
(Jordan) B A Alshannik (Jordan) D Amro
BYE
2	(Indonesia) T Ahmad (Indonesia) L Natsir

Second round
(India) A Vishnu (India) A Balan	13	5
(China) Lu K (China) Huang YQ	21	21
(Jordan) B A Alshannik (Jordan) D Amro	W	/	O
2	(Indonesia) T Ahmad (Indonesia) L Natsir

Quarterfinals
(China) Lu K (China) Huang YQ	19	11
2	(Indonesia) T Ahmad (Indonesia) L Natsir	21	21
