= 2015 India Super Series =

Tournament details
- Dates: 24–29 March 2015
- Level: Super Series
- Total prize money: US$275,000
- Venue: Siri Fort Indoor Stadium
- Location: New Delhi, India

Champions
- Men's singles: (India) Srikanth Kidambi
- Women's singles: (India) Saina Nehwal
- Men's doubles: (China) Chai Biao (China) Hong Wei
- Women's doubles: (Japan) Misaki Matsutomo (Japan) Ayaka Takahashi
- Mixed doubles: (China) Liu Cheng (China) Bao Yixin

The 2015 India Super Series was the second super series tournament of the 2015 BWF Super Series. The tournament took place in Siri Fort Sports Complex, New Delhi, India from 24 to 29 March 2015 and had a total purse of $275,000. A qualification was held to fill four places in both singles events and Men's doubles of the main draws. Results and scores are provided in detail in the page.

== Men's singles ==
=== Seeds ===
1. (Denmark) Jan Ø. Jørgensen
2. (India) Srikanth Kidambi
3. (China) Lin Dan
4. (Chinese Taipei) Chou Tien-chen
5. (Denmark) Hans-Kristian Vittinghus
6. (Denmark) Viktor Axelsen
7. (China) Wang Zhengming
8. (Indonesia) Tommy Sugiarto

=== Top half ===
First Round
1	(Denmark) J Ø Jørgensen	21	21
(Japan) S Sasaki	18	13
(Israel) M Zilberman	20	8
(India) Prannoy H.S.	22	21
6	(Denmark) V Axelsen	21	21
(India) B S Praneeth	4	18
Q4	(Chinese Taipei) Lin Y-h	15	21	21
(India) A Pawar	21	17	5
3	(China) Lin D	21	21
(Chinese Taipei) Wang T-w	15	16
(Hong Kong) Hu Y	15	21	21
(India) A Jayaram	21	9	15
8	(Indonesia) T Sugiarto	21	21
(France) B Leverdez	17	7
PFQ	(Czech Republic) P Koukal	26	21
(Hong Kong) Wei N	28	23

Second Round
1	(Denmark) J Ø Jørgensen	21	14	14
(India) Prannoy H.S.	18	21	21
6	(Denmark) V Axelsen	21	21
Q4	(Chinese Taipei) Lin Y-h	10	12
3	(China) Lin D	21	21
(Hong Kong) Hu Y	13	16
8	(Indonesia) T Sugiarto	21	21
(Hong Kong) Wei N	12	13

Quarterfinals
(India) Prannoy H.S.	21	9	18
6	(Denmark) V Axelsen	16	21	21
3	(China) Lin D	17	21	17
8	(Indonesia) T Sugiarto	21	15	21

Semifinals
6	(Denmark) V Axelsen	22	17
8	(Indonesia) T Sugiarto	24	11^{r}

=== Bottom half ===
First Round
Q3	(India) R.M.V.Gurusaidutt	21	17	23
(South Korea) Lee D-k	14	21	21
Q2	(India) S Verma	21	21
5	(Denmark) H-K Vittinghus	15	17
(Chinese Taipei) Hsu J-h	21	19	18
(India) K Parupalli	16	21	21
Q1	(China) Xue S	21	21
4	(Chinese Taipei) Chou T-c	14	16
(Hong Kong) Wong W K	16	12
(Japan) T Ueda	21	21
(Denmark) J Persson	14	21	14
7	(China) Wang ZM	21	8	21
(Japan) K Momota	21	21
(Germany) M Zwiebler	8	19
(Thailand) T Saensomboonsuk	17	16
2	(India) Srikanth K.	21	21

Second Round
Q3	(India) R.M.V.Gurusaidutt	18	21	21
Q2	(India) S Verma	21	19	18
(India) K Parupalli	17	11
Q1	(China) Xue S	21	21
(Japan) T Ueda	21	21
7	(China) Wang ZM	16	19
(Japan) K Momota	12	21	15
2	(India) Srikanth K.	21	15	21

Quarterfinals
Q3	(India) R.M.V.Gurusaidutt	21	18	13
Q1	(China) Xue S	15	21	21
(Japan) T Ueda	15	25	18
2	(India) Srikanth K.	21	23	21

Semifinals
Q1	(China) Xue S	16	13
2	(India) Srikanth K.	21	21

=== Finals ===
Semifinals
6	(Denmark) Viktor Axelsen	22	17
8	(Indonesia) Tommy Sugiarto	24	11^{r}
Q1	(China) Xue Song	16	13
2	(India) Srikanth Kidambi	21	21

Final
6	(Denmark) Viktor Axelsen	21	13	12
2	(India) Srikanth Kidambi	18	21	21

== Women's singles ==
=== Seeds ===
1. (India) Saina Nehwal
2. (Spain) Carolina Marín
3. (Thailand) Ratchanok Intanon
4. (China) Liu Xin
5. (Japan) Minatsu Mitani
6. (Japan) Nozomi Okuhara
7. (Hong Kong) Yip Pui Yin
8. (Chinese Taipei) Pai Yu-po

=== Top half ===
First Round
1	(India) S Nehwal	21	21
Q3	(India) R Mukherjee	5	13
(India) R Gadde	21	21
Q1	(India) R Nikam	7	6
8	(Chinese Taipei) Pai Y-p	17	21	21
(Switzerland) S Jaquet	21	7	18
(Indonesia) H Ramadini	14	21	21
(Italy) J Cicognini	21	14	19
PFQ	(India) S Gokhale	16	22	16
(Japan) Y Hashimoto	21	20	21
Q2	(India) E Kalia	21	15
(India) R Pillai	23	21
7	(Hong Kong) Yip P Y	21	21
(Austria) E Baldauf	10	15
(Chinese Taipei) Yu C-h	11	12
(South Korea) Kim H-m	21	21

Second Round
1	(India) S Nehwal	21	21
(India) R Gadde	16	17
8	(Chinese Taipei) Pai Y-p	18	21	15
(Indonesia) H Ramadini	21	16	21
(Japan) Y Hashimoto	21	21
(India) R Pillai	6	14
7	(Hong Kong) Yip P Y	21	13	21
(South Korea) Kim H-m	19	21	15

Quarterfinals
1	(India) S Nehwal	21	21
(Indonesia) H Ramadini	15	12
(Japan) Y Hashimoto	20	21	21
7	(Hong Kong) Yip P Y	22	15	17

Semifinals
1	(India) S Nehwal	21	21
(Japan) Y Hashimoto	15	11

=== Bottom half ===
First Round
(China) Yao X	21	21
(India) P.C. Thulasi	16	15
Q4	(India) K Garg	7	7
5	(Japan) M Mitani	21	21
(Indonesia) A Firdasari	21	26
(India) S Mundada	9	24
(India) S Rane	9	11
3	(Thailand) R Intanon	21	21
PFQ	(India) M Dhainje	19	14
(Chinese Taipei) Cheng C-y	21	21
(United States) J Subandhi	7	8
6	(Japan) N Okuhara	21	21
(Chinese Taipei) Hsu Y-c	21	21
(India) T Lad	9	18
PFQ	(India) N Pandit	7	8
2	(Spain) C Marín	21	21

Second Round
(China) Yao X	21	21
5	(Japan) M Mitani	15	10
(Indonesia) A Firdasari	16	12
3	(Thailand) R Intanon	21	21
(Chinese Taipei) Cheng C-y	14	16
6	(Japan) N Okuhara	21	21
(Chinese Taipei) Hsu Y-c	16	13
2	(Spain) C Marín	21	21

Quarterfinals
(China) Yao X	14	8
3	(Thailand) R Intanon	21	21
6	(Japan) N Okuhara	15	21	15
2	(Spain) C Marín	21	17	21

Semifinals
3	(Thailand) R Intanon	21	21	22
2	(Spain) C Marín	19	23	20

=== Finals ===
Semifinals
1	(India) Saina Nehwal	21	21
(Japan) Yui Hashimoto	15	11
3	(Thailand) Ratchanok Intanon	21	21	22
2	(Spain) Carolina Marín	19	23	20

Final
1	(India) Saina Nehwal	21	21
3	(Thailand) Ratchanok Intanon	16	14

== Men's doubles ==
=== Seeds ===
1. (Denmark) Mathias Boe / Carsten Mogensen
2. (Japan) Hiroyuki Endo / Kenichi Hayakawa
3. (China) Chai Biao / Hong Wei
4. (China) Liu Xiaolong / Qiu Zihan
5. (Japan) Hirokatsu Hashimoto / Noriyasu Hirata
6. (China) Wang Yilv / Zhang Wen
7. (Denmark) Mads Conrad-Petersen / Mads Pieler Kolding
8. (Russia) Vladimir Ivanov / Ivan Sozonov

=== Top half ===
First Round
1	(Denmark) M Boe (Denmark) C Mogensen	21	21
Q4	(India) S Ramchandran (India) S Shukla	16	10
Q2	(India) G Prasad (India) S. Sanjeeth	7	14
(India) A Francis (India) A Vishnu	21	21
6	(China) Wang YL (China) Zhang W	21	21
(India) A Chhikara (India) D Khatri	12	12
(India) K Singh (India) N Vashist	5	9
(Denmark) A Skårup Rasmussen (Denmark) K Astrup Sorensen	21	21
4	(China) Liu XL (China) Qiu ZH	21	21
(Chinese Taipei) Liang J-w (Chinese Taipei) Lu C-p	9	10
PFQ	(India) T Kona (India) S Ravuri	21	21
PFQ	(India) U Arora (India) A Prakash	14	14
7	(Denmark) M Conrad-Petersen (Denmark) M Pieler Kolding	21	21
(Japan) T Kamura (Japan) K Sonoda	17	17
(Singapore) D B Chrisnanta (Singapore) C Triyachart	21	21
(India) A K R Malgari (India) H N Babu	18	18

Second Round
1	(Denmark) M Boe (Denmark) C Mogensen	21	21
(India) A Francis (India) A Vishnu	16	18
6	(China) Wang YL (China) Zhang W	21	21
(Denmark) A Skårup Rasmussen (Denmark) K Astrup Sorensen	19	19
4	(China) Liu XL (China) Qiu ZH	21	21
PFQ	(India) T Kona (India) S Ravuri	12	11
7	(Denmark) M Conrad-Petersen (Denmark) M Pieler Kolding	17	21	21
(Singapore) D B Chrisnanta (Singapore) C Triyachart	21	17	19

Quarterfinals
1	(Denmark) M Boe (Denmark) C Mogensen	21	21
6	(China) Wang YL (China) Zhang W	19	14
4	(China) Liu XL (China) Qiu ZH	12	18
7	(Denmark) M Conrad-Petersen (Denmark) M Pieler Kolding	21	21

Semifinals
1	(Denmark) M Boe (Denmark) C Mogensen	23	18
7	(Denmark) M Conrad-Petersen (Denmark) M Pieler Kolding	25	21

=== Bottom half ===
First Round
(United States) P Chew (United States) S Pongnairat	10	13
(Chinese Taipei) Chen H-l (Chinese Taipei) Wang C-l	21	21
Q3	(India) A Raju (India) G Venkat	9	8
5	(Japan) H Hashimoto (Japan) N Hirata	21	21
(Thailand) K Ketlen (Thailand) D Puavaranukroh	21	21
Q1	(India) T Laa (India) S Sipani	9	5
(India) P J Chopra (India) A Dewalker	15	9
3	(China) Chai B (China) Hong W	21	21
(China) Kang J (China) Liu C	21	21
(India) A George (India) K. Nandagopal	17	11
(Thailand) W Buranakuea (Thailand) P Vilailak	14	16
8	(Russia) V Ivanov (Russia) I Sozonov	21	21
(South Korea) Choi S-g (South Korea) Ko S-h	23	21
(Hong Kong) Chan Y L (Hong Kong) Lee C H	21	17
(India) M Attri (India) S Reddy B	15	11
2	(Japan) H Endo (Japan) K Hayakawa	21	21

Second Round
(Chinese Taipei) Chen H-l (Chinese Taipei) Wang C-l	22	19
5	(Japan) H Hashimoto (Japan) N Hirata	24	21
(Thailand) K Ketlen (Thailand) D Puavaranukroh	11	14
3	(China) Chai B (China) Hong W	21	21
(China) Kang J (China) Liu C	20	19
8	(Russia) V Ivanov (Russia) I Sozonov	22	21
(South Korea) Choi S-g (South Korea) Ko S-h	17	21	18
2	(Japan) H Endo (Japan) K Hayakawa	21	15	21

Quarterfinals
5	(Japan) H Hashimoto (Japan) N Hirata	21	19	15
3	(China) Chai B (China) Hong W	13	21	21
8	(Russia) V Ivanov (Russia) I Sozonov	25	11	21
2	(Japan) H Endo (Japan) K Hayakawa	23	21	12

Semifinals
3	(China) Chai B (China) Hong W	17	21	21
8	(Russia) V Ivanov (Russia) I Sozonov	21	18	12

=== Finals ===
Semifinals
1	(Denmark) Mathias Boe (Denmark) Carsten Mogensen	23	18
7	(Denmark) Mads Conrad-Petersen (Denmark) Mads Pieler Kolding	25	21
3	(China) Chai Biao (China) Hong Wei	17	21	21
8	(Russia) Vladimir Ivanov (Russia) Ivan Sozonov	21	18	12

Final
7	(Denmark) Mads Conrad-Petersen (Denmark) Mads Pieler Kolding	18	14
3	(China) Chai Biao (China) Hong Wei	21	21

== Women's doubles ==
=== Seeds ===
1. (Japan) Misaki Matsutomo / Ayaka Takahashi
2. (China) Luo Ying / Luo Yu
3. (Denmark) Christinna Pedersen / Kamilla Rytter Juhl
4. (Japan) Reika Kakiiwa / Miyuki Maeda
5. (South Korea) Lee So-hee / Shin Seung-chan
6. (China) Ou Dongni / Yu Xiaohan
7. (China) Bao Yixin / Tang Jinhua
8. (Malaysia) Vivian Hoo Kah Mun / Woon Khe Wei

=== Top half ===
First Round
1	(Japan) M Matsutomo (Japan) A Takahashi	21	21
(Thailand) D Aroonkesorn (Thailand) K Voravichitchaikul	5	10
Q1	(India) N Karamchand (India) R Sahdev	7	8
(Chinese Taipei) Chang H-t (Chinese Taipei) Cheng C-y	21	21
5	(South Korea) Lee S-h (South Korea) Shin S-c	21	21
(Indonesia) A S Awanda (Indonesia) N K M Istirani	11	18
(India) D Nair (India) M Sahdev	6	13
(Germany) J Goliszewski (Germany) C Nelte	21	21
3	(Denmark) C Pedersen (Denmark) K Rytter Juhl	21	21
(India) D Gautam (India) S Panchal	12	11
(Chinese Taipei) Hsu Y-c (Chinese Taipei) Pai Y-p	21	23
(Malaysia) Chin K M (Malaysia) Chow M K	15	21
8	(Malaysia) V Hoo K M (Malaysia) Woon K W	21	21
Q2	(Indonesia) G R Imawan (Indonesia) T R Nuraidah	15	19
(Hong Kong) Chan T K (Hong Kong) Tse Y S	21	21
(India) J. Meghana (India) K. Maneesha	11	17

Second Round
1	(Japan) M Matsutomo (Japan) A Takahashi	21	21
(Chinese Taipei) Chang H-t (Chinese Taipei) Cheng C-y	15	14
5	(South Korea) Lee S-h (South Korea) Shin S-c	21	21
(Germany) J Goliszewski (Germany) C Nelte	12	17
3	(Denmark) C Pedersen (Denmark) K Rytter Juhl	21	21
(Chinese Taipei) Hsu Y-c (Chinese Taipei) Pai Y-p	13	9
8	(Malaysia) V Hoo K M (Malaysia) Woon K W	13	21
(Hong Kong) Chan T K (Hong Kong) Tse Y S	21	23

Quarterfinals
1	(Japan) M Matsutomo (Japan) A Takahashi	15	21	21
5	(South Korea) Lee S-h (South Korea) Shin S-c	21	11	14
3	(Denmark) C Pedersen (Denmark) K Rytter Juhl	21	21
(Hong Kong) Chan T K (Hong Kong) Tse Y S	10	15

Semifinals
1	(Japan) M Matsutomo (Japan) A Takahashi	21	17	22
3	(Denmark) C Pedersen (Denmark) K Rytter Juhl	15	21	20

=== Bottom half ===
First Round
(India) K Garg (India) N B Hazarika	21	21
Q4	(India) Ch. Poornima (India) S Nagarkoti	11	10
Q3	(Thailand) C Chaladchalam (Thailand) P Muenwong	16	15
7	(China) Bao YX (China) Tang JH	21	21
(India) P Gadre (India) N. S Reddy	13	13
(South Korea) Jang Y-n (South Korea) Yoo H-w	21	21
(India) S Mundada (India) R Pillai	7	6
4	(Japan) R Kakiiwa (Japan) M Maeda	21	21
(India) L Dahiya (India) J Nashier	7	6
(Singapore) V Neo Y Y (Singapore) S M Sari	21	21
(India) J Gutta (India) A Ponnappa	16	18
6	(China) Ou DN (China) Yu XH	21	21
(Japan) N Fukuman (Japan) K Yonao	21	22
(Malaysia) Lim Y L (Malaysia) Lee M Y	10	20
(Germany) I Herttrich (Germany) B Michels	14	14
2	(China) Luo Y (China) Luo Y	21	21

Second Round
(India) K Garg (India) N B Hazarika	4	6
7	(China) Bao YX (China) Tang JH	21	21
(South Korea) Jang Y-n (South Korea) Yoo H-w	21	21
4	(Japan) R Kakiiwa (Japan) M Maeda	16	11
(Singapore) V Neo Y Y (Singapore) S M Sari	12	19
6	(China) Ou DN (China) Yu XH	21	21
(Japan) N Fukuman (Japan) K Yonao	16	19
2	(China) Luo Y (China) Luo Y	21	21

Quarterfinals
7	(China) Bao YX (China) Tang JH	21	21
(South Korea) Jang Y-n (South Korea) Yoo H-w	18	12
6	(China) Ou DN (China) Yu XH	21	11	17
2	(China) Luo Y (China) Luo Y	19	21	21

Semifinals
7	(China) Bao YX (China) Tang JH	27	19
2	(China) Luo Y (China) Luo Y	29	21

=== Finals ===
Semifinals
1	(Japan) Misaki Matsutomo (Japan) Ayaka Takahashi	21	17	22
3	(Denmark) Christinna Pedersen (Denmark) Kamilla Rytter Juhl	15	21	20
7	(China) Bao Yixin (China) Tang Jinhua	27	19
2	(China) Luo Ying (China) Luo Yu	29	21

Final
1	(Japan) Misaki Matsutomo (Japan) Ayaka Takahashi	21	21
2	(China) Luo Ying (China) Luo Yu	19	19

== Mixed doubles ==
=== Seeds ===
1. (Denmark) Joachim Fischer Nielsen / Christinna Pedersen
2. (China) Liu Cheng / Bao Yixin
3. (Indonesia) Riky Widianto / Richi Puspita Dili
4. (China) Lu Kai / Huang Yaqiong
5. (Denmark) Mads Pieler Kolding / Kamilla Rytter Juhl
6. (Singapore) Danny Bawa Chrisnanta / Vanessa Neo Yu Yan
7. (Indonesia) Praveen Jordan / Debby Susanto
8. (Hong Kong) Lee Chun Hei / Chau Hoi Wah

=== Top half ===
First Round
1	(Denmark) J Fischer Nielsen (Denmark) C Pedersen	21	21
(India) M Attri (India) K. Maneesha	5	16
Q4	(Chinese Taipei) Chang K-c (Chinese Taipei) Chang H-t	7	21	19
(Germany) M Fuchs (Germany) I Hettrich	21	15	21
8	(Hong Kong) Lee C H (Hong Kong) Chau H W	21	19	21
(India) G Venkat (India) J Dewangan	10	21	12
(Malaysia) Wong F Y (Malaysia) Chow M K	21	20	17
(Japan) K Hayakawa (Japan) M Matsutomo	14	22	21
4	(China) Lu K (China) Huang YQ	22	21
(South Korea) Choi S-k (South Korea) Chae Y-j	20	14
Q1	(India) R Rathore (India) P Naqvi	11	8
(United States) P Chew (United States) J Subandhi	21	21
7	(Indonesia) P Jordan (Indonesia) D Susanto	21	21
Q2	(India) T. H N Babu (India) S. P Ram	13	16
(Germany) M Schwenger (Germany) C Nelte	19	21
(Hong Kong) Chan Y L (Hong Kong) Tse Y S	21	23

Second Round
1	(Denmark) J Fischer Nielsen (Denmark) C Pedersen	21	21
(Germany) M Fuchs (Germany) I Hettrich	15	14
8	(Hong Kong) Lee C H (Hong Kong) Chau H W	10	8
(Japan) K Hayakawa (Japan) M Matsutomo	21	21
4	(China) Lu K (China) Huang YQ	22	21
(United States) P Chew (United States) J Subandhi	20	11
7	(Indonesia) P Jordan (Indonesia) D Susanto	21	21
(Hong Kong) Chan Y L (Hong Kong) Tse Y S	11	16

Quarterfinals
1	(Denmark) J Fischer Nielsen (Denmark) C Pedersen	21	21
(Japan) K Hayakawa (Japan) M Matsutomo	10	18
4	(China) Lu K (China) Huang YQ	21	12
7	(Indonesia) P Jordan (Indonesia) D Susanto	23	21

Semifinals
1	(Denmark) J Fischer Nielsen (Denmark) C Pedersen	21	21
7	(Indonesia) P Jordan (Indonesia) D Susanto	16	14

=== Bottom half ===
First Round
(Indonesia) E Subaktiar (Indonesia) G E Widjaja	21	21
PFQ	(India) V Sharma (India) R Sahdev	10	13
(Malaysia) Tan A Q (Malaysia) Lai P J	21	21
6	(Singapore) D B Chrisnanta (Singapore) V Neo Y Y	12	17
Q3	(South Korea) Kim D-y (South Korea) Yoo H-w	21	21
(India) A Dewalkar (India) P Gadre	18	10
(Singapore) C Triyachart (Singapore) S M Sari	21	17	24
PFQ	(India) T Kona (India) N. S Reddy	15	21	22
(Chinese Taipei) Wang C-l (Chinese Taipei) Cheng C-y	21	21
(India) A Vishnu (India) A Balan	15	9
(India) P J Chopra (India) A Ponnappa	13	22	19
5	(Denmark) M Pieler Kolding (Denmark) K Rytter Juhl	21	20	21
(India) R Sahdev (India) M Sahdev	7	8
(Japan) K Sonoda (Japan) N Fukuman	21	21
(India) K Singh (India) S Nagarkoti	12	5
2	(China) Liu C (China) Bao YX	21	21

Second Round
(Indonesia) E Subaktiar (Indonesia) G E Widjaja	21	14	21
(Malaysia) Tan A Q (Malaysia) Lai P J	19	21	15
Q3	(South Korea) Kim D-y (South Korea) Yoo H-w	13	21	15
(Singapore) C Triyachart (Singapore) S M Sari	21	11	21
(Chinese Taipei) Wang C-l (Chinese Taipei) Cheng C-y	10	15
5	(Denmark) M Pieler Kolding (Denmark) K Rytter Juhl	21	21
(Japan) K Sonoda (Japan) N Fukuman	15	16
2	(China) Liu C (China) Bao YX	21	21

Quarterfinals
(Indonesia) E Subaktiar (Indonesia) G E Widjaja	21	21
(Singapore) C Triyachart (Singapore) S M Sari	7	18
5	(Denmark) M Pieler Kolding (Denmark) K Rytter Juhl	17	20
2	(China) Liu C (China) Bao YX	21	22

Semifinals
(Indonesia) E Subaktiar (Indonesia) G E Widjaja	13	10
2	(China) Liu C (China) Bao YX	21	21

=== Finals ===
Semifinals
1	(Denmark) Joachim Fischer Nielsen (Denmark) Christinna Pedersen	21	21
7	(Indonesia) Praveen Jordan (Indonesia) Debby Susanto	16	14
(Indonesia) Edi Subaktiar (Indonesia) Gloria Emanuelle Widjaja	13	10
2	(China) Liu Cheng (China) Bao Yixin	21	21

Final
1	(Denmark) Joachim Fischer Nielsen (Denmark) Christinna Pedersen	19	19
2	(China) Liu Cheng (China) Bao Yixin	21	21

Preceded by 2014 India Super Series	India Open	Succeeded by 2016 India Super Series
Preceded by 2015 All England Super Series Premier	BWF Super Series; 2015 BWF Season	Succeeded by 2015 Malaysia Super Series Premier
