= Luo Yu =

Chinese badminton player (born 1991)

Luo Yu 骆羽
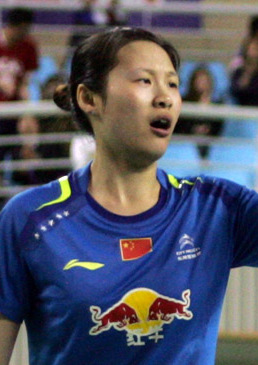
- Luo at the 2014 Asian Championships

Personal information
- Born: Luo Xiaoshuang 骆晓霜; 11 January 1991 (age 35) Shandong, China
- Height: 1.64 m (5 ft 5 in)
- Weight: 66 kg (146 lb)

Sport
- Country: China
- Sport: Badminton
- Handedness: Right

Women's & mixed doubles
- Highest ranking: 1 (WD, 10 March 2016); 86 (XD, 29 November 2012)
- BWF profile
Medal record
Women's badminton
Representing China
Asian Championships
Gold medal – first place	2014 Gimcheon	Women's doubles
Bronze medal – third place	2015 Wuhan	Women's doubles
Asia Team Championships
Gold medal – first place	2016 Hyderabad	Women's team
Summer Universiade
Silver medal – second place	2013 Kazan	Women's doubles
Silver medal – second place	2013 Kazan	Mixed team
World Junior Championships
Gold medal – first place	2009 Alor Setar	Mixed team
Asian Junior Championships
Silver medal – second place	2009 Kuala Lumpur	Girls' doubles
Silver medal – second place	2009 Kuala Lumpur	Mixed team

Luo Yu
- Simplified Chinese: 骆羽
- Traditional Chinese: 駱羽
Transcriptions
Standard Mandarin
- Hanyu Pinyin: Luò Yǔ

Luo Xiaoshuang
- Simplified Chinese: 骆晓霜
- Traditional Chinese: 駱曉霜
Transcriptions
Standard Mandarin
- Hanyu Pinyin: Luò Xiǎoshuāng

Luo Yu (Chinese: 骆羽; born 11 January 1991) is a Chinese badminton player who specializes in doubles. Together with her twin sister, Luo Ying, they competed in the international badminton, and were ranked as World number 1 on 10 March 2016. The twins participated at the Rio 2016 Summer Olympics but did not advance to the knocked-out stage after placing third in the group stage. The biggest title of their career to date, the 2015 BWF Superseries Finals, sent the pair to #1 in the world rankings.

== Achievements ==
=== Asian Championships ===
Women's doubles
Year	Venue	Partner	Opponent	Score	Result
2014	Gimcheon Indoor Stadium; Gimcheon, South Korea	(China) Luo Ying	(South Korea) Jung Kyung-eun (South Korea) Kim Ha-na	21–18, 21–18	Gold
2015	Wuhan Sports Center Gymnasium; Wuhan, China	(China) Luo Ying	(China) Ma Jin (China) Tang Yuanting	12–21, 0–0 retired	Bronze

=== Summer Universiade ===
Women's doubles
Year	Venue	Partner	Opponent	Score	Result
2013	Tennis Academy; Kazan, Russia	(China) Tian Qing	(South Korea) Jang Ye-na (South Korea) Kim So-young	25–27, 21–15, 21–23	Silver

=== Asian Junior Championships ===
Girls' doubles
Year	Venue	Partner	Opponent	Score	Result
2009	Stadium Juara; Kuala Lumpur, Malaysia	(China) Luo Ying	(China) Tang Jinhua (China) Xia Huan	21–14, 17–21, 13–21	Silver

=== BWF Superseries ===
The BWF Superseries, which was launched on 14 December 2006 and implemented in 2007, is a series of elite badminton tournaments, sanctioned by the Badminton World Federation (BWF). BWF Superseries levels are Superseries and Superseries Premier. A season of Superseries consists of twelve tournaments around the world that have been introduced since 2011. Successful players are invited to the Superseries Finals, which are held at the end of each year.

Women's doubles
Year	Tournament	Partner	Opponent	Score	Result
2012	China Masters	(China) Cheng Shu	(China) Bao Yixin (China) Zhong Qianxin	12–21, 15–21	(silver) Runner-up
2014	Korea Open	(China) Luo Ying	(China) Bao Yixin (China) Tang Jinhua	17–21, 15–21	(silver) Runner-up
2015	India Open	(China) Luo Ying	(Japan) Misaki Matsutomo (Japan) Ayaka Takahashi	19–21, 19–21	(silver) Runner-up
2015	Malaysia Open	(China) Luo Ying	(South Korea) Jang Ye-na (South Korea) Jung Kyung-eun	21–18, 21–9	(gold) Winner
2015	French Open	(China) Luo Ying	(China) Huang Yaqiong (China) Tang Jinhua	13–21, 16–21	(silver) Runner-up
2015	Dubai World Superseries Finals	(China) Luo Ying	(Denmark) Christinna Pedersen (Denmark) Kamilla Rytter Juhl	14–21, 21–9, 14–4 retired	(gold) Winner
2016	Korea Open	(China) Luo Ying	(South Korea) Jung Kyung-eun (South Korea) Shin Seung-chan	13–21, 11–21	(silver) Runner-up

BWF Super Series Finals tournament
BWF Super Series Premier tournament
BWF Super Series tournament

=== BWF Grand Prix ===
The BWF Grand Prix had two levels, the BWF Grand Prix and Grand Prix Gold. It was a series of badminton tournaments sanctioned by the Badminton World Federation (BWF) which was held from 2007 to 2017.

Women's doubles
Year	Tournament	Partner	Opponent	Score	Result
2010	Indonesia Grand Prix Gold	(China) Luo Ying	(Indonesia) Meiliana Jauhari (Indonesia) Greysia Polii	11–21, 21–18, 21–11	(gold) Winner
2012	Australian Open	(China) Luo Ying	(Chinese Taipei) Cheng Wen-hsing (Chinese Taipei) Chien Yu-chin	12–21, 21–18, 21–17	(gold) Winner
2013	Indonesia Grand Prix Gold	(China) Luo Ying	(China) Huang Dongping (China) Jia Yifan	19–21, 21–15, 21–18	(gold) Winner
2014	China Masters	(China) Luo Ying	(China) Huang Yaqiong (China) Yu Xiaohan	21–17, 21–19	(gold) Winner
2015	Chinese Taipei Open	(China) Luo Ying	(Indonesia) Nitya Krishinda Maheswari (Indonesia) Greysia Polii	17–21, 17–21	(silver) Runner-up
2016	China Masters	(China) Luo Ying	(China) Chen Qingchen (China) Jia Yifan	16–21, 21–15, 21–18	(gold) Winner
2016	Chinese Taipei Open	(China) Luo Ying	(China) Huang Dongping (China) Zhong Qianxin	18–21, 16–21	(silver) Runner-up

BWF Grand Prix Gold tournament
BWF Grand Prix tournament

=== BWF International Challenge/Series ===
Women's doubles
Year	Tournament	Partner	Opponent	Score	Result
2014	China International	(China) Luo Ying	(China) Ou Dongni (China) Xiong Mengjing	21–13, 21–12	(gold) Winner

BWF International Challenge tournament
BWF International Series tournament
