= Bao Yixin =

Chinese badminton player (born 1992)

Bao Yixin 包宜鑫
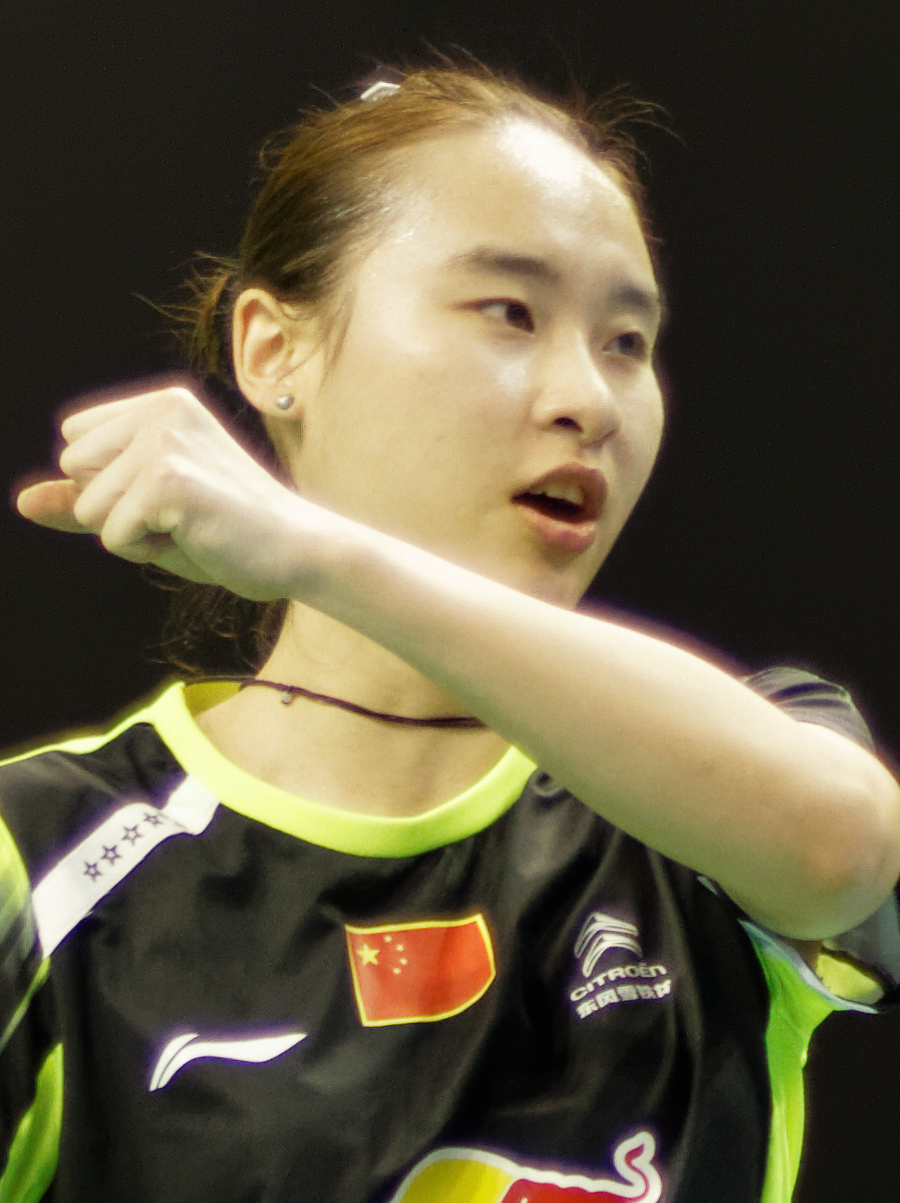
- Bao at the 2013 French Super Series

Personal information
- Full name: Zhao Yatong 赵娅彤
- Born: 29 September 1992 (age 34) Zhuzhou, Hunan, China
- Height: 1.74 m (5 ft 9 in)
- Spouse: Liu Cheng (m. 2019)

Sport
- Country: China
- Sport: Badminton
- Handedness: Right
- Coached by: Chen Qiqiu
- Retired: 11 September 2017

Women's & mixed doubles
- Highest ranking: 1 (WD 23 October 2014); 2 (XD with Liu Cheng 3 December 2015)
- BWF profile
Medal record
Women's badminton
Representing China
World Championships
Silver medal – second place	2015 Jakarta	Mixed doubles
Bronze medal – third place	2014 Copenhagen	Mixed doubles
Sudirman Cup
Silver medal – second place	2017 Gold Coast	Mixed team
Uber Cup
Gold medal – first place	2014 New Delhi	Women's team
Asian Games
Gold medal – first place	2014 Incheon	Women's team
Asian Championships
Silver medal – second place	2012 Qingdao	Women's doubles
Bronze medal – third place	2011 Chengdu	Women's doubles
Asia Mixed Team Championships
Bronze medal – third place	2017 Ho Chi Minh	Mixed team
World Junior Championships
Gold medal – first place	2009 Alor Setar	Mixed team
Gold medal – first place	2010 Guadalajara	Girls' doubles
Gold medal – first place	2010 Guadalajara	Mixed doubles
Gold medal – first place	2010 Guadalajara	Mixed team
Bronze medal – third place	2009 Alor Setar	Mixed doubles
Asian Junior Championships
Gold medal – first place	2009 Kuala Lumpur	Mixed doubles
Gold medal – first place	2010 Kuala Lumpur	Mixed doubles
Gold medal – first place	2010 Kuala Lumpur	Mixed team
Silver medal – second place	2009 Kuala Lumpur	Mixed team
Silver medal – second place	2010 Kuala Lumpur	Girls' doubles

Bao Yixin
- Simplified Chinese: 包宜鑫
- Traditional Chinese: 包宜鑫
Transcriptions
Standard Mandarin
- Hanyu Pinyin: Bāo Yíxīn

Zhao Yatong
- Simplified Chinese: 赵娅彤
- Traditional Chinese: 趙婭彤
Transcriptions
Standard Mandarin
- Hanyu Pinyin: Zhào Yàtóng

Zhao Yatong (Chinese: 赵娅彤; born Bao Yixin, 29 September 1992) is a Chinese badminton doubles player. She won titles in the women's doubles category with many different partners. She won two World Junior titles at the 2010 BWF World Junior Championships held in Guadalajara, Mexico. In the girls' doubles event, she was crowned World Junior Champion with Ou Dongni and in the mixed doubles she was crowned with Liu Cheng. She also won the mixed doubles at the 2009 Asian Junior Championships with Lu Kai and the mixed doubles at the 2010 Asian Junior Championships with Liu Cheng. Partnering with Tang Yuanting, Bao became the women's doubles champion at the 2015 All England Open. Bao graduated with a bachelor's degree from Xiangtan University.

== Career ==
Bao Yixin started to playing badminton when she was child at the age of 6, and began to receive a formal training at the age of 8. She was selected in to the national team when she was 14, playing in the doubles discipline.

Women's doubles

In 2010, Bao Yixin reached the women's doubles final of the China Masters with Lu Lu. Ath the age of 19, she first won the 2011 Japan Open with Zhong Qianxin and the Canada Open Grand Prix with Cheng Shu. One year later, the couple Bao and Zhong won the 2012 Singapore Open and the China Masters back to back. They also reached the final of the 2012 Swiss Open losing to compatriots Xia Huan and Tang Jinhua and the final of the 2012 India Open losing to the Korean pair of Jung Kyung-eun and Kim Ha-na. The couple of Bao Yixin and Zhong Qianxin reached the number 2 spot on the BWF World Ranking for women's doubles in January 2013. They lost the final of the 2013 China Open at home to compatriots Wang Xiaoli and Yu Yang.

Before this, early in 2013, Bao Yixin paired up with Tian Qing to win the 2013 Malaysia Open. Later in the month June 2013, Bao Yixin teamed up again with Cheng Shu to win the 2013 Indonesia Open final in a close fought battle against teammates Tian Qing and Zhao Yunlei 21–17, 22–20. One month later in July 2013, Bao teamed up with Zhong Qianxin again to this time win the 2013 U.S. Open. She also reached the quarter finales of the World Championships with Zhong in August of the same year.

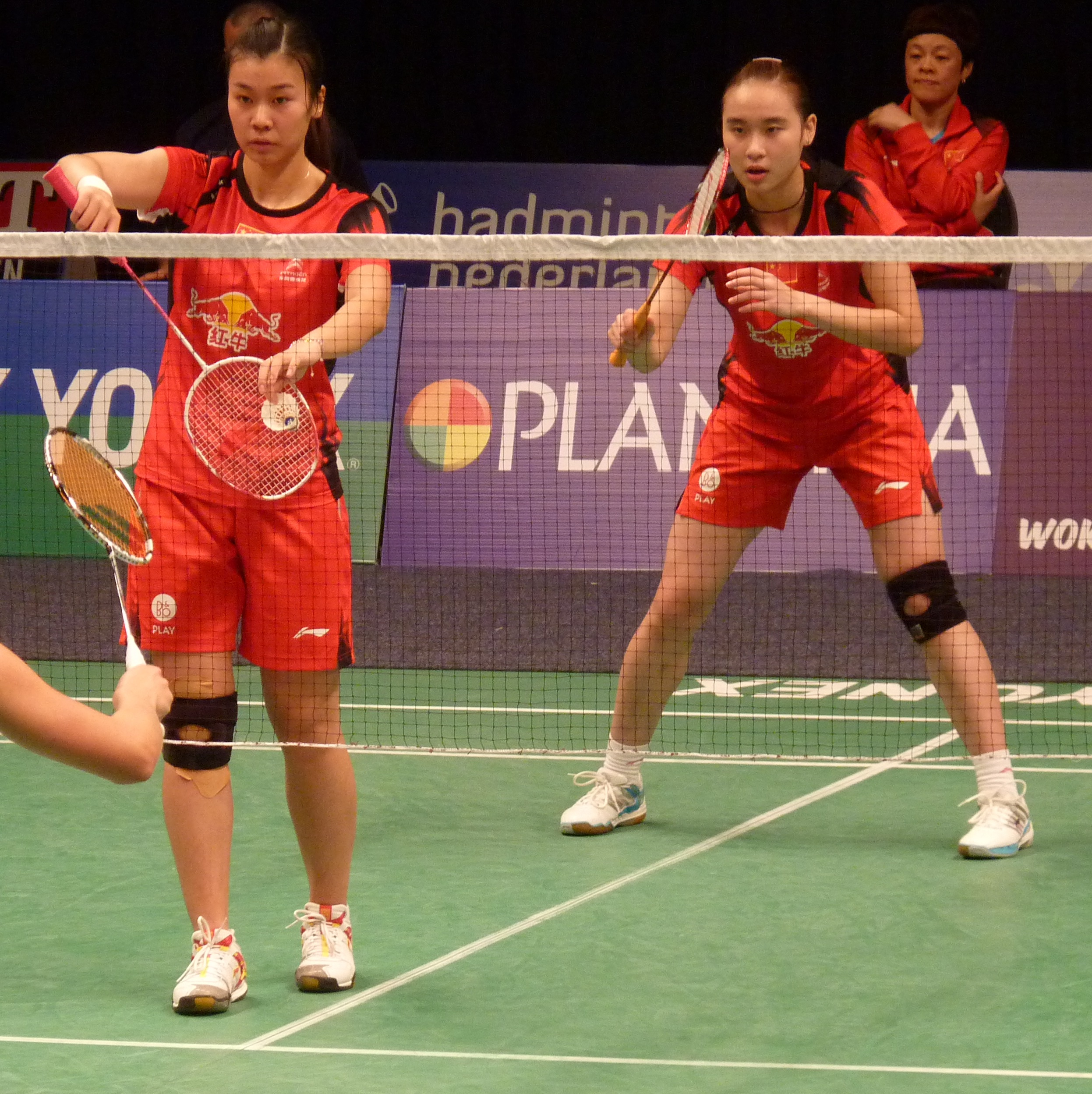
Bao and Tang Jinhua at 2013 Dutch Open Grand Prix

For the last quarter of 2013, Bao Yixin was paired up with a new partner again. This time it was Tang Jinhua and this would become an instant success winning five big women's doubles events in the last part of the year 2013. There were victories at the finals of the Dutch Open, Denmark Open, French Open, Hong Kong Open and the Macau Open. Of the first 28 matches played this new couple only lost one match. In 2014, Bao and Tang won the Korea Open, Malaysia Open, Swiss Open and the Singapore Open. She was also part of the Chinese Uber Cup winning team in 2014. Together with women's doubles partner Tang Jinhua she reached the number one spot of the BWF World Ranking on 29 May 2014.

In March 2015, she won the All England Open Badminton Championships in women's doubles with her partner Tang Yuanting, defeating the defending champions Wang Xiaoli and Yu Yang.

Mixed doubles

Bao Yixin and her partner Liu Cheng reached the final of the 2013 Hong Kong Open in mixed doubles. One year earlier, she had already reached the final of the 2012 French Open with Qiu Zihan, narrowly losing in three games to Xu Chen and Ma Jin (17–21, 21–19, 18–21). Her biggest victory to date in the mixed doubles event was winning the 2011 Indonesia Open Grand Prix Gold with He Hanbin after opponents Xu Chen and Ma Jin had to retire with injury in the second game of the final (21–19, 1–4). After two semi-finals at the Swiss and the Singapore Opens Bao Yixin and Liu Cheng received a bronze medal at the 2014 BWF World Championships in Copenhagen, Denmark by reaching another semi-final.

Retirement

Bao announced her retirement through her social media account on 11 September 2017. After retired, she continue her law degree in Xiangtan University in Hunan, and then moved to study English in Sydney, Australia. She also teaching badminton in a local club in Sydney in her spare time.

== Personal life ==
Bao Yixin is married to her former partner in mixed doubles Liu Cheng.

== Achievements ==
=== BWF World Championships ===
Mixed doubles
Year	Venue	Partner	Opponent	Score	Result
2014	Ballerup Super Arena, Copenhagen, Denmark	(China) Liu Cheng	(China) Zhang Nan (China) Zhao Yunlei	15–21, 13–21	Bronze
2015	Istora Senayan, Jakarta, Indonesia	(China) Liu Cheng	(China) Zhang Nan (China) Zhao Yunlei	17–21, 11–21	Silver

=== Asian Championships ===
Women's doubles
Year	Venue	Partner	Opponent	Score	Result
2011	Sichuan Gymnasium, Chengdu, China	(China) Zhong Qianxin	(China) Wang Xiaoli (China) Yu Yang	17–21, 9–21	Bronze
2012	Qingdao Sports Centre Conson Stadium, Qingdao, China	(China) Zhong Qianxin	(China) Tian Qing (China) Zhao Yunlei	14–21, 15–21	Silver

=== BWF World Junior Championships ===
Girls' doubles
Year	Venue	Partner	Opponent	Score	Result
2010	Domo del Code Jalisco, Guadalajara, Mexico	(China) Ou Dongni	(China) Tang Jinhua (China) Xia Huan	21–13, 21–18	Gold

Mixed doubles
Year	Venue	Partner	Opponent	Score	Result
2009	Stadium Sultan Abdul Halim, Alor Setar, Malaysia	(China) Lu Kai	(Indonesia) Angga Pratama (Indonesia) Della Destiara Haris	19–21, 18–21	Bronze
2010	Domo del Code Jalisco, Guadalajara, Mexico	(China) Liu Cheng	(South Korea) Kang Ji-wook (South Korea) Choi Hye-in	21–15, 21–15	Gold

=== Asian Junior Championships ===
Girls' doubles
Year	Venue	Partner	Opponent	Score	Result
2010	Stadium Juara, Kuala Lumpur, Malaysia	(China) Ou Dongni	(China) Tang Jinhua (China) Xia Huan	17–21, 8–21	Silver

Mixed doubles
Year	Venue	Partner	Opponent	Score	Result
2009	Stadium Juara, Kuala Lumpur, Malaysia	(China) Lu Kai	(China) Liu Peixuan (China) Xia Huan	21–15, 21–19	Gold
2010	Stadium Juara, Kuala Lumpur, Malaysia	(China) Liu Cheng	(Malaysia) Ow Yao Han (Malaysia) Lai Pei Jing	Walkover	Gold

=== BWF Superseries ===
The BWF Superseries, which was launched on 14 December 2006 and implemented in 2007, is a series of elite badminton tournaments, sanctioned by the Badminton World Federation (BWF). BWF Superseries levels are Superseries and Superseries Premier. A season of Superseries consists of twelve tournaments around the world that have been introduced since 2011. Successful players are invited to the Superseries Finals, which are held at the end of each year.

Women's doubles
Year	Tournament	Partner	Opponent	Score	Result
2010	China Masters	(China) Lu Lu	(China) Wang Xiaoli (China) Yu Yang	8–21, 8–21	(silver) Runner-up
2011	Japan Open	(China) Zhong Qianxin	(Chinese Taipei) Chen Wen-hsing (Chinese Taipei) Chien Yu-chin	13–21, 25–23, 21–12	(gold) Winner
2012	India Open	(China) Zhong Qianxin	(South Korea) Jung Kyung-eun (South Korea) Kim Ha-na	17–21, 18–21	(silver) Runner-up
2012	Singapore Open	(China) Zhong Qianxin	(Chinese Taipei) Cheng Wen-hsing (Chinese Taipei) Chien Yu-chin	21–12, 21–17	(gold) Winner
2012	China Masters	(China) Zhong Qianxin	(China) Cheng Shu (China) Luo Yu	21–12, 21–15	(gold) Winner
2013	Malaysia Open	(China) Tian Qing	(Japan) Misaki Matsutomo (Japan) Ayaka Takahashi	21–16, 21–14	(gold) Winner
2013	Indonesia Open	(China) Cheng Shu	(China) Wang Xiaoli (China) Yu Yang	15–21, 21–18, 21–18	(gold) Winner
2013	Denmark Open	(China) Tang Jinhua	(Denmark) Christinna Pedersen (Denmark) Kamilla Rytter Juhl	21–16, 21–13	(gold) Winner
2013	French Open	(China) Tang Jinhua	(China) Tian Qing (China) Zhao Yunlei	21–13, 21–17	(gold) Winner
2013	China Open	(China) Zhong Qianxin	(China) Wang Xiaoli (China) Yu Yang	13–21, 7–21	(silver) Runner-up
2013	Hong Kong Open	(China) Tang Jinhua	(China) Ou Dongni (China) Tang Yuanting	18–21, 21–16, 21–15	(gold) Winner
2014	Korea Open	(China) Tang Jinhua	(China) Luo Ying (China) Luo Yu	21–17, 21–15	(gold) Winner
2014	Malaysia Open	(China) Tang Jinhua	(Japan) Misaki Matsutomo (Japan) Ayaka Takahashi	21–19, 14–21, 21–13	(gold) Winner
2014	Singapore Open	(China) Tang Jinhua	(Denmark) Christinna Pedersen (Denmark) Kamilla Rytter Juhl	14–21, 21–19, 21–15	(gold) Winner
2015	All England Open	(China) Tang Yuanting	(China) Wang Xiaoli (China) Yu Yang	21–14, 21–14	(gold) Winner
2016	Australian Open	(China) Chen Qingchen	(Indonesia) Nitya Krishinda Maheswari (Indonesia) Greysia Polii	23–21, 21–17	(gold) Winner

Mixed doubles
Year	Tournament	Partner	Opponent	Score	Result
2012	French Open	(China) Qiu Zihan	(China) Xu Chen (China) Ma Jin	17–21, 21–19, 18–21	(silver) Runner-up
2013	Hong Kong Open	(China) Liu Cheng	(England) Chris Adcock (England) Gabrielle White	14–21, 22–24	(silver) Runner-up
2014	Dubai World Superseries Finals	(China) Liu Cheng	(China) Zhang Nan (China) Zhao Yunlei	15–21, 12–21	(silver) Runner-up
2015	India Open	(China) Liu Cheng	(Denmark) Joachim Fischer Nielsen (Denmark) Christinna Pedersen	21–19, 21–19	(gold) Winner
2015	Australian Open	(China) Liu Cheng	(Hong Kong) Lee Chun Hei (Hong Kong) Chau Hoi Wah	19–21, 21–19, 15–21	(silver) Runner-up
2015	Hong Kong Open	(China) Liu Cheng	(China) Zhang Nan (China) Zhao Yunlei	17–21, 21–17, 17–21	(silver) Runner-up

BWF Super Series Finals tournament
BWF Super Series Premier tournament
BWF Super Series tournament

=== BWF Grand Prix ===
The BWF Grand Prix had two levels, the BWF Grand Prix and Grand Prix Gold. It was a series of badminton tournaments sanctioned by the Badminton World Federation (BWF) which was held from 2007 to 2017.

Women's doubles
Year	Tournament	Partner	Opponent	Score	Result
2011	Thailand Open	(China) Cheng Shu	(China) Tian Qing (China) Zhao Yunlei	7–21, 8–21	(silver) Runner-up
2011	Canada Open	(China) Cheng Shu	(Chinese Taipei) Cheng Wen-hsing (Chinese Taipei) Chien Yu-chin	21–13, 23–21	(gold) Winner
2011	Indonesia Grand Prix Gold	(China) Zhong Qianxin	(Malaysia) Vivian Hoo Kah Mun (Malaysia) Woon Khe Wei	21–19, 19–21, 18–21	(silver) Runner-up
2012	Swiss Open	(China) Zhong Qianxin	(China) Tang Jinhua (China) Xia Huan	17–21, 10–21	(silver) Runner-up
2013	U.S. Open	(China) Zhong Qianxin	(China) Huang Yaqiong (China) Yu Xiaohan	21–17, 24–22	(gold) Winner
2013	Dutch Open	(China) Tang Jinhua	(Indonesia) Anggia Shitta Awanda (Indonesia) Della Destiara Haris	21–15, 21–7	(gold) Winner
2013	Macau Open	(China) Tang Jinhua	(China) Huang Yaqiong (China) Yu Xiaohan	21–17, 21–15	(gold) Winner
2014	Swiss Open	(China) Tang Jinhua	(Indonesia) Nitya Krishinda Maheswari (Indonesia) Greysia Polii	19–21, 21–16, 21–13	(gold) Winner
2015	Swiss Open	(China) Tang Yuanting	(Japan) Ayane Kurihara (Japan) Naru Shinoya	21–19, 14–21, 21–17	(gold) Winner
2015	China Masters	(China) Tang Yuanting	(China) Tang Jinhua (China) Zhong Qianxin	14–21, 21–11, 17–21	(silver) Runner-up
2017	China Masters	(China) Yu Xiaohan	(China) Huang Yaqiong (China) Tang Jinhua	8–21, 21–14, 21–17	(gold) Winner

Mixed doubles
Year	Tournament	Partner	Opponent	Score	Result
2011	Indonesia Grand Prix Gold	(China) He Hanbin	(China) Xu Chen (China) Ma Jin	21–19, 1–4 retired	(gold) Winner
2015	Swiss Open	(China) Liu Cheng	(China) Lu Kai (China) Huang Yaqiong	21–17, 20–22, 13–21	(silver) Runner-up
2015	China Masters	(China) Liu Cheng	(Indonesia) Edi Subaktiar (Indonesia) Gloria Emanuelle Widjaja	18–21, 21–15, 26–24	(gold) Winner

BWF Grand Prix Gold tournament
BWF Grand Prix tournament
