= 2012 Vietnam Open Grand Prix =

Tournament details
- Dates: August 20, 2012 - August 26, 2012
- Total prize money: US$50,000
- Venue: Phan Dinh Phung Stadium
- Location: Ho Chi Minh City, Vietnam

The 2012 Vietnam Open Grand Prix was the ninth grand prix gold and grand prix tournament of the 2012 BWF Grand Prix Gold and Grand Prix. The tournament was held in Phan Dinh Phung Stadium, Ho Chi Minh City, Vietnam from 20 to 26 August 2012 and had a total purse of $50,000.

== Men's singles ==
=== Seeds ===
1. (Vietnam) Nguyen Tien Minh (champion)
2. (Indonesia) Dionysius Hayom Rumbaka (semi-final)
3. (India) Ajay Jayaram (second round)
4. (Indonesia) Alamsyah Yunus (quarter-final)
5. (Indonesia) Sony Dwi Kuncoro (semi-final)
6. (Japan) Takuma Ueda (final)
7. (India) Sourabh Varma (third round)
8. (Chinese Taipei) Chou Tien-chen (quarter-final)
9. (Thailand) Tanongsak Saensomboonsuk (first round)
10. (India) Rajah Menuri Venkata Gurusaidutt (first round)
11. (Hong Kong) Chan Yan Kit (third round)
12. (Malaysia) Mohd Arif Abdul Latif (third round)
13. (India) Anand Pawar (first round)
14. (Thailand) Suppanyu Avihingsanon (first round)
15. (Singapore) Derek Wong Zi Liang (first round)
16. (Singapore) Ashton Chen Yong Zhao (third round)

=== Finals ===
Quarterfinals
1 | (Vietnam) Nguyen Tien Minh | 21 | 21
(Japan) Kento Momota | 14 | 18
4 | (Indonesia) Alamsyah Yunus | 11 | 14
5 | (Indonesia) Sony Dwi Kuncoro | 21 | 21
6 | (Japan) Takuma Ueda | 21 | 21
(India) Arvind Bhat | 8 | 17
8 | (Chinese Taipei) Chou Tien-chen | 15 | 18
2 | (Indonesia) D Hayom Rumbaka | 21 | 21

Semifinals
1 | (Vietnam) Nguyen Tien Minh | 21 | 28
5 | (Indonesia) Sony Dwi Kuncoro | 15 | 26
6 | (Japan) Takuma Ueda | 21 | 21
2 | (Indonesia) D Hayom Rumbaka | 17 | 16

Final
1 | (Vietnam) Nguyen Tien Minh | 21 | 21
6 | (Japan) Takuma Ueda | 14 | 19

=== Top half ===
==== Section 1 ====
First Round
1 | (Vietnam) Nguyen TM | 21 | 21
(Indonesia) A Pratama | 7 | 15
(Thailand) B Thumpanichwong | 21 | 8 | 15
(Indonesia) R Subagja | 15 | 21 | 21
12 | (Malaysia) A Abdul Latif | 21 | 16 | 21
(Thailand) P Vilailak | 14 | 21 | 10
(Hong Kong) Wei N | 19 | 21 | 21
(Chinese Taipei) Shih K-c | 21 | 18 | 17

Second Round
1 | (Vietnam) Nguyen TM | 21 | 21
(Indonesia) R Subagja | 14 | 16
12 | (Malaysia) A Abdul Latif | 21 | 21
(Hong Kong) Wei N | 9 | 15

Third Round
1 | (Vietnam) Nguyen TM | 21 | 21
12 | (Malaysia) A Abdul Latif | 14 | 7

==== Section 2 ====
First Round
7 | (India) S Varma | 21 | 21
PFQ | (Malaysia) Woon KH | 12 | 12
(Malaysia) K Yogendran | 21 | 13 | 21
(Chinese Taipei) Lin Y-h | 18 | 21 | 18
9 | (Thailand) T Saensomboonsuk | 21 | 14 | 18
(Japan) K Momota | 19 | 21 | 21
(Malaysia) Z Zulkiffli | 21 | 19 | 18
Q2 | (Hong Kong) Tam CH | 12 | 21 | 21

Second Round
7 | (India) S Varma | 21 | 23
(Malaysia) K Yogendran | 14 | 21
(Japan) K Momota | 13 | 21 | 21
Q2 | (Hong Kong) Tam CH | 21 | 11 | 7

Third Round
7 | (India) S Varma | 17 | 21 | 22
(Japan) K Momota | 21 | 6 | 24

==== Section 3 ====
First Round
4 | (Indonesia) A Yunus | 21 | 21
(South Korea) Hong J-h | 18 | 9
Q5 | (Thailand) S Matayanumati | 10 | 20
(Chinese Taipei) Teng S-h | 21 | 21
10 | (India) R Gurusaidutt | 16 | 21 | 14
(Malaysia) I Zainuddin | 21 | 19 | 21
(Hong Kong) Ng KL | 21 | 14 | 21
(Malaysia) Chan KB | 17 | 21 | 18

Second Round
4 | (Indonesia) A Yunus | 16 | 21 | 21
(Chinese Taipei) Teng S-h | 21 | 10 | 8
(Malaysia) I Zainuddin | 21 | 21
(Hong Kong) Ng KL | 19 | 12

Third Round
4 | (Indonesia) A Yunus | 19 | 21 | 21
(Malaysia) I Zainuddin | 21 | 13 | 14

==== Section 4 ====
First Round
5 | (Indonesia) S Kuncoro | 21 | 21
(Malaysia) Kuan BH | 16 | 5
Q7 | (Chinese Taipei) Hsu S-w | 19 | 21 | 18
(Chinese Taipei) Wan C-h | 21 | 14 | 21
16 | (Singapore) A Chen | 21 | 21
(Malaysia) B Wong | 16 | 15
(Thailand) K Phetpradab | 11 | 21 | 21
(Indonesia) W Prasetyo | 21 | 18 | 17

Second Round
5 | (Indonesia) S Kuncoro | 21 | 21
(Chinese Taipei) Wan C-h | 13 | 17
16 | (Singapore) A Chen | 21 | 21
(Thailand) K Phetpradab | 20 | 19

Third Round
5 | (Indonesia) S Kuncoro | 22 | 21
16 | (Singapore) A Chen | 20 | 15

=== Bottom half ===
==== Section 5 ====
First Round
(Singapore) R Gonansa | 15 | 22 | 13
Q4 | (Indonesia) P Sudrajat | 21 | 20 | 21
(India) P Kumar | 11 | 21 | 21
15 | (Singapore) D Wong | 21 | 17 | 14
Q6 | (Malaysia) Loke KP | 13 | 12
(Indonesia) S Rhustavito | 21 | 21
(Malaysia) Chiang JS | 14 | 9
6 | (Japan) T Ueda | 21 | 21

Second Round
Q4 | (Indonesia) P Sudrajat | 15 | 21 | 18
(India) P Kumar | 21 | 13 | 21
(Indonesia) S Rhustavito | 16 | 15
6 | (Japan) T Ueda | 21 | 21

Third Round
(India) P Kumar | 14 | 21 | 17
6 | (Japan) T Ueda | 21 | 17 | 21

==== Section 6 ====
First Round
(Thailand) T Sitthikom | 13 | 21 | 19
(Malaysia) R Misbun | 21 | 19 | 21
(Malaysia) Soong JV | 12 | 16
11 | (Hong Kong) Chan YK | 21 | 21
(Malaysia) Soo TZ | 17 | 14
(India) A Bhat | 21 | 21
(Indonesia) A Dharma | 17 | 11
3 | (India) A Jayaram | 21 | 21

Second Round
(Malaysia) R Misbun | 18 | 16
11 | (Hong Kong) Chan YK | 21 | 21
(India) A Bhat | 23 | 21
3 | (India) A Jayaram | 21 | 17

Third Round
11 | (Hong Kong) Chan YK | 20 | 21 | 15
(India) A Bhat | 22 | 9 | 21

==== Section 7 ====
First Round
(Indonesia) A Ramadhan | 21 | 21
(Japan) S Wada | 12 | 19
(Chinese Taipei) Wang T-w | 21 | 21 | 21
13 | (India) A Pawar | 19 | 23 | 9
(Thailand) P Poodchalat | 21 | 21
(Malaysia) Wong CH | 14 | 9
(Malaysia) Goh SH | 21 | 17 | 14
8 | (Chinese Taipei) Chou T-c | 11 | 21 | 21

Second Round
(Indonesia) A Ramadhan | 17 | 14
(Chinese Taipei) Wang T-w | 21 | 21
(Thailand) P Poodchalat | 24 | 22 | 16
8 | (Chinese Taipei) Chou T-c | 22 | 24 | 21

Third Round
(Chinese Taipei) Wang T-w | 16 | 21 | 20
8 | (Chinese Taipei) Chou T-c | 21 | 19 | 22

==== Section 8 ====
First Round
(Malaysia) Loh WS | 21 | 21
(India) M Kamat | 12 | 16
Q8 | (Indonesia) S Setia Putra | 21 | 21
14 | (Thailand) S Avihingsanon | 17 | 15
Q1 | (Vietnam) Nguyen HN | 21 | 14 | 21
Q3 | (Malaysia) Chong YH | 18 | 21 | 15
(India) A Sridhar | 11 | 14
2 | (Indonesia) D Rumbaka | 21 | 21

Second Round
(Malaysia) Loh WS | 13 | 21 | 21
Q8 | (Indonesia) S Setia Putra | 21 | 14 | 9
Q1 | (Vietnam) Nguyen HN | 16 | 19
2 | (Indonesia) D Rumbaka | 21 | 21

Third Round
(Malaysia) Loh WS | 22 | 7 | 14
2 | (Indonesia) D Rumbaka | 20 | 21 | 21

== Women's singles ==
=== Seeds ===
1. (Thailand) Porntip Buranaprasertsuk (champion)
2. (Japan) Eriko Hirose (quarter-final)
3. (Singapore) Fu Mingtian (first round)
4. (Thailand) Sapsiree Taerattanachai (semi-final)
5. (Singapore) Xing Aiying (first round)
6. (Indonesia) Maria Febe Kusumastuti (second round)
7. (Indonesia) Bellaetrix Manuputty (quarter-final)
8. (Indonesia) Aprilia Yuswandari (quarter-final)

=== Finals ===
Semifinals
1 | (Thailand) Porntip Buranaprasertsuk | 21 | 18 | 21
(Thailand) Busanan Ongbumrungpan | 13 | 21 | 16
4 | (Thailand) Sapsiree Taerattanachai | 21 | 16 | 16
(Indonesia) Lindaweni Fanetri | 15 | 21 | 21

Final
1 | (Thailand) Porntip Buranaprasertsuk | 21 | 21
(Indonesia) Lindaweni Fanetri | 10 | 18

=== Top half ===
==== Section 1 ====
First Round
1 | (Thailand) P Buranaprasertsuk | 21 | 21
(Malaysia) L Cheah | 13 | 10
(India) P Thulasi | 21 | 21
(Hong Kong) Chan HY | 11 | 16
8 | (Indonesia) A Yuswandari | 26 | 19 | 21
Q2 | (Singapore) Liang XY | 24 | 21 | 13
(Hong Kong) Cheung NY | 17 | 11
(Indonesia) H Desi | 21 | 21

Second Round
1 | (Thailand) P Buranaprasertsuk | 21 | 21
(India) P Thulasi | 15 | 16
8 | (Indonesia) A Yuswandari | 16 | 21 | 21
(Indonesia) H Desi | 21 | 11 | 18

Quarterfinals
1 | (Thailand) P Buranaprasertsuk | 19 | 21 | 21
8 | (Indonesia) A Yuswandari | 21 | 15 | 14

==== Section 2 ====
First Round
3 | (Singapore) Fu MT | 21 | 11 | 16
(Thailand) B Ongbumrungpan | 18 | 21 | 21
(Malaysia) S Cheah | 12 | 16
(Japan) N Okuhara | 21 | 21
6 | (Indonesia) M Kusumastuti | 20 | 21 | 21
(India) T Lad | 22 | 15 | 9
(Thailand) N Jindapon | 19 | 12
(Japan) K Imabeppu | 21 | 21

Second Round
(Thailand) B Ongbumrungpan | 19 | 21 | 21
(Japan) N Okuhara | 21 | 15 | 16
6 | (Indonesia) M Kusumastuti | 21 | 17
(Japan) K Imabeppu | 23 | 21

Quarterfinals
(Thailand) B Ongbumrungpan | 17 | 21 | 21
(Japan) K Imabeppu | 21 | 20 | 19

=== Bottom half ===
==== Section 3 ====
First Round
(India) A Pantawane | wo
Q1 | (Thailand) R Prajongjai
(France) S Vignes Waran | 21 | 19 | 15
7 | (Indonesia) B Manuputty | 17 | 21 | 21
(Indonesia) A Firdasari | 21 | 21
(Malaysia) Yang LL | 18 | 18
(Malaysia) S Saniru | 17 | 11
4 | (Thailand) S Taerattanachai | 21 | 21

Second Round
Q1 | (Thailand) R Prajongjai | 19 | 22 | 15
7 | (Indonesia) B Manuputty | 21 | 20 | 21
(Indonesia) A Firdasari | 21 | 16 | 17
4 | (Thailand) S Taerattanachai | 19 | 21 | 21

Quarterfinals
7 | (Indonesia) B Manuputty | 18 | 19
4 | (Thailand) S Taerattanachai | 21 | 21

==== Section 4 ====
First Round
Q3 | (Japan) Y Kusunose | 19 | 19
(Thailand) S Ponsana | 21 | 21
(Indonesia) L Fanetri | 22 | 21
5 | (Singapore) Xing AY | 20 | 19
(Singapore) Chen JY | 21 | 21
(Hong Kong) Mong KY | 19 | 12
Q4 | (Chinese Taipei) Chen H-h | 23 | 21 | 19
2 | (Japan) E Hirose | 25 | 9 | 21

Second Round
(Thailand) S Ponsana | 19 | 19
(Indonesia) L Fanetri | 21 | 21
(Singapore) Chen JY | 17 | 18
2 | (Japan) E Hirose | 21 | 21

Quarterfinals
(Indonesia) L Fanetri | 14 | 21 | 21
2 | (Japan) E Hirose | 21 | 10 | 14

== Men's doubles ==
=== Seeds ===
1. (South Korea) Kim Ki-jung / Kim Sa-rang (semi-final)
2. (Thailand) Bodin Issara / Maneepong Jongjit (champion)
3. (Malaysia) Mohd Zakry Abdul Latif / Mohd Fairuzizuan Mohd Tazari (first round)
4. (Indonesia) Ricky Karanda Suwardi / Muhammad Ulinnuha (semi-final)
5. (Indonesia) Alvent Yulianto / Markis Kido (quarter-final)
6. (Malaysia) Hoon Thien How / Tan Wee Kiong (quarter-final)
7. (Indonesia) Markus Fernaldi Gideon / Agripinna Prima Rahmanto Putra (quarter-final)
8. (Malaysia) Gan Teik Chai / Ong Soon Hock (first round)

=== Finals ===
Semifinals
1 | (South Korea) Kim Ki-jung (South Korea) Kim Sa-rang | 16 | 21 | 19
(Indonesia) Yohanes Rendy Sugiarto (Indonesia) Afiat Yuris Wirawan | 21 | 15 | 21
4 | (Indonesia) Ricky Karanda Suwardi (Indonesia) Muhammad Ulinnuha | 11 | 13
2 | (Thailand) Bodin Issara (Thailand) Maneepong Jongjit | 21 | 21

Final
(Indonesia) Yohanes Rendy Sugiarto (Indonesia) Afiat Yuris Wirawan | 21 | 16 | 11
2 | (Thailand) Bodin Issara (Thailand) Maneepong Jongjit | 19 | 21 | 21

=== Top half ===
==== Section 1 ====
First Round
1 | (South Korea) Kim K-j (South Korea) Kim S-r | 21 | 21
(Hong Kong) Chan TK (Hong Kong) Lo LK | 18 | 11
(Malaysia) Mak HC (Malaysia) Teo KS | 21 | 8 | 20
(Indonesia) H Faisal (Indonesia) P Rhoma | 13 | 21 | 22
8 | (Malaysia) Gan TC (Malaysia) Ong SH | 17 | 25 | 16
(Singapore) D Chrisnanta (Singapore) C Triyachart | 21 | 23 | 21
(Malaysia) L Abdul Khalid (Malaysia) V Mawan | 21 | 14 | 16
Q3 | (Malaysia) Chow PC (Malaysia) Tan BS | 15 | 21 | 21

Second Round
1 | (South Korea) Kim K-j (South Korea) Kim S-r | 21 | 21
(Indonesia) H Faisal (Indonesia) P Rhoma | 10 | 16
(Singapore) D Chrisnanta (Singapore) C Triyachart | 19 | 12
Q3 | (Malaysia) Chow PC (Malaysia) Tan BS | 21 | 21

Quarterfinals
1 | (South Korea) Kim K-j (South Korea) Kim S-r | 21 | 21
Q3 | (Malaysia) Chow PC (Malaysia) Tan BS | 11 | 12

==== Section 2 ====
First Round
3 | (Malaysia) Z Abdul Latif (Malaysia) F Tazari | 19 | 22 | 18
(Indonesia) A Adistia (Indonesia) C Rusdianto | 21 | 20 | 21
(Indonesia) Y Sugiarto (Indonesia) A Wirawan | 21 | 21
(Chinese Taipei) Liang J-w (Chinese Taipei) Liao K-h | 16 | 18
5 | (Indonesia) A Yulianto (Indonesia) M Kido | 21 | 21
Q4 | (Malaysia) Chong YH (Malaysia) Soo TZ | 6 | 13
(Thailand) P Chalardchaleam (Thailand) N Puangpuapech | 21 | 21
(Chinese Taipei) Chen C-j (Chinese Taipei) Lu C-b | 15 | 15

Second Round
(Indonesia) A Adistia (Indonesia) C Rusdianto | 15 | 19
(Indonesia) Y Sugiarto (Indonesia) A Wirawan | 21 | 21
5 | (Indonesia) A Yulianto (Indonesia) M Kido | 21 | 21
(Thailand) P Chalardchaleam (Thailand) N Puangpuapech | 20 | 19

Quarterfinals
(Indonesia) Y Sugiarto (Indonesia) A Wirawan | 21 | 21
5 | (Indonesia) A Yulianto (Indonesia) M Kido | 9 | 17

=== Bottom half ===
==== Section 3 ====
First Round
(Malaysia) Chooi KM (Malaysia) Ow YH | 21 | 21
(India) P Chopra (India) A Dewalkar | 15 | 18
(Malaysia) Low JS (Malaysia) Tan YJ | 14 | 21 | 16
7 | (Indonesia) M Gideon (Indonesia) A Putra | 21 | 19 | 21
(Hong Kong) Lee CH (Hong Kong) Ng KL | 20 | 21 | 17
(Malaysia) Kok ZY (Malaysia) Kong KZ | 22 | 16 | 21
(Malaysia) R Abdul Latif (Malaysia) Z Zainuddin | 11 | 14
4 | (Indonesia) R Suwardi (Indonesia) M Ulinnuha | 21 | 21

Second Round
(Malaysia) Chooi KM (Malaysia) Ow YH | 20 | 14
7 | (Indonesia) M Gideon (Indonesia) A Putra | 21 | 21
(Malaysia) Kok ZY (Malaysia) Kong KZ | 14 | 12
4 | (Indonesia) R Suwardi (Indonesia) M Ulinnuha | 21 | 21

Quarterfinals
7 | (Indonesia) M Gideon (Indonesia) A Putra | 17 | 21 | 13
4 | (Indonesia) R Suwardi (Indonesia) M Ulinnuha | 21 | 11 | 21

==== Section 4 ====
First Round
(Malaysia) N Heg (Malaysia) Teo EY | 21 | 15 | 18
(Chinese Taipei) Lu C-y (Chinese Taipei) Tseng M-h | 18 | 21 | 21
(South Korea) Kang J-w (South Korea) Lee S-j | 16 | 14
6 | (Malaysia) Hoon TH (Malaysia) Tan WK | 21 | 21
(Singapore) T Yeo (Singapore) Liu Y | 21 | 14 | 21
Q1 | (Thailand) S Anugritayawon (Thailand) T Lapoe | 19 | 21 | 17
Q2 | (Chinese Taipei) Chang K-l (Chinese Taipei) Huang P-j | 14 | 11
2 | (Thailand) B Issara (Thailand) M Jongjit | 21 | 21

Second Round
(Chinese Taipei) Lu C-y (Chinese Taipei) Tseng M-h | 19 | 16
6 | (Malaysia) Hoon TH (Malaysia) Tan WK | 21 | 21
(Singapore) T Yeo (Singapore) Liu Y | 11 | 15
2 | (Thailand) B Issara (Thailand) M Jongjit | 21 | 21

Quarterfinals
6 | (Malaysia) Hoon TH (Malaysia) Tan WK | 21 | 21 | 10
2 | (Thailand) B Issara (Thailand) M Jongjit | 23 | 15 | 21

== Women's doubles ==
=== Seeds ===
1. (Japan) Shizuka Matsuo / Mami Naito (second round)
2. (South Korea) Eom Hye-won / Jang Ye-na (withdrew)
3. (Malaysia) Vivian Hoo Kah Mun / Woon Khe Wei (quarter-final)
4. (Malaysia) Ng Hui Ern / Ng Hui Lin (final)
5. (Japan) Rie Eto / Yu Wakita (quarter-final)
6. (Indonesia) Pia Zebadiah / Rizki Amelia Pradipta (champion)
7. (Indonesia) Suci Rizki Andini / Della Destiara Haris (second round)
8. (Chinese Taipei) Chien Yu-chin / Wu Ti-jung (semi-final)

=== Finals ===
Semifinals
8 | (Chinese Taipei) Chien Yu-chin (Chinese Taipei) Wu Ti-jung | 18 | 18
6 | (Indonesia) Pia Zebadiah (Indonesia) Rizki Amelia Pradipta | 21 | 21
4 | (Malaysia) Ng Hui Ern (Malaysia) Ng Hui Lin | 18 | 21 | 21
Q4 | (Thailand) Porntip Buranaprasertsuk (Thailand) Busanan Ongbumrungpan | 21 | 14 | 10

Final
6 | (Indonesia) Pia Zebadiah (Indonesia) Rizki Amelia Pradipta | 21 | 21
4 | (Malaysia) Ng Hui Ern (Malaysia) Ng Hui Lin | 17 | 19

=== Top half ===
==== Section 1 ====
First Round
1 | (Japan) S Matsuo (Japan) M Naito | 21 | 21
(South Korea) Choi H-i (South Korea) Kim S-y | 13 | 11
(Japan) A Shimozaki (Japan) E Moue | 21 | 21
(Thailand) A Serithammarak (Thailand) C Chaladchalam | 12 | 17
8 | (Chinese Taipei) Chien Y-c (Chinese Taipei) Wu T- | 23 | 21
(Malaysia) Lai PJ (Malaysia) M Ng | 21 | 15
Q2 | (Chinese Taipei) Chang C-h (Chinese Taipei) Chang H-t | 17 | 13
(Indonesia) G Imawan (Indonesia) T Nuraidah | 21 | 21

Second Round
1 | (Japan) S Matsuo (Japan) M Naito | 21 | 18 | 21
(Japan) A Shimozaki (Japan) E Moue | 14 | 21 | 23
8 | (Chinese Taipei) Chien Y-c (Chinese Taipei) Wu T-j | 16 | 21 | 21
(Indonesia) G Imawan (Indonesia) T Nuraidah | 21 | 18 | 19

Quarterfinals
(Japan) A Shimozaki (Japan) E Moue | 14 | 23 | 21
8 | (Chinese Taipei) Chien Y-c (Chinese Taipei) Wu T-j | 21 | 21 | 23

==== Section 2 ====
First Round
3 | (Malaysia) V Hoo (Malaysia) Woon KW | 21 | 21
Q1 | (Vietnam) Nguyen TTT (Vietnam) Nguyen NQP | 9 | 5
(Indonesia) K Hanadia (Indonesia) D Permatasari
(Vietnam) Nguyen TS (Vietnam) Vu TT | wo
6 | (Indonesia) P Zebadiah (Indonesia) R Pradipta | 21 | 21
(Thailand) R Chuthabunditkul (Thailand) C Julrattanamanee | 12 | 14
(Thailand) P Arkornsakul (Thailand) J Kittiharakul | 21 | 11 | 23
PFQ | (Chinese Taipei) Chen S-y (Chinese Taipei) Chen T-y | 16 | 21 | 21

Second Round
3 | (Malaysia) V Hoo (Malaysia) Woon KW | 21 | 21
(Indonesia) K Hanadia (Indonesia) D Permatasari | 15 | 16
6 | (Indonesia) P Zebadiah (Indonesia) R Pradipta | 19 | 21 | 21
(Thailand) P Arkornsakul (Thailand) J Kittiharakul | 21 | 7 | 10

Quarterfinals
3 | (Malaysia) V Hoo (Malaysia) Woon KW | 21 | 19 | 12
6 | (Indonesia) P Zebadiah (Indonesia) R Pradipta | 18 | 21 | 21

=== Bottom half ===
==== Section 3 ====
First Round
(Indonesia) K Dewi (Indonesia) J Gozali | 17 | 13
(Thailand) P Munkitamorn (Thailand) S Ponsana | 21 | 21
(Singapore) Fu MT (Singapore) Xing AY | 13 | 9
5 | (Japan) R Eto (Japan) Y Wakita | 21 | 21
(Malaysia) Chow MK (Malaysia) Lee MY | 21 | 21
Q3 | (Chinese Taipei) Chang Y-h (Chinese Taipei) Shih Y-c | 11 | 11
(Chinese Taipei) Chiang P-h (Chinese Taipei) Shuai P-l | 15 | 16
4 | (Malaysia) Ng HE (Malaysia) Ng HL | 21 | 21

Second Round
(Thailand) P Munkitamorn (Thailand) S Ponsana | 6 | 19
5 | (Japan) R Eto (Japan) Y Wakita | 21 | 21
(Malaysia) Chow MK (Malaysia) Lee MY | 8 | 13
4 | (Malaysia) Ng HE (Malaysia) Ng HL | 21 | 21

Quarterfinals
5 | (Japan) R Eto (Japan) Y Wakita | 18 | 20
4 | (Malaysia) Ng HE (Malaysia) Ng HL | 21 | 22

==== Section 4 ====
First Round
(Thailand) P Krajangjit (Thailand) L Narissapat | 21 | 25
(Malaysia) A Anscelly (Malaysia) Soong FC | 17 | 23
PFQ | (Vietnam) Nguyen TAD (Vietnam) Nguyen TBT | 11 | 11
7 | (Indonesia) S Andini (Indonesia) D Haris | 21 | 21
(Malaysia) Chong SC (Malaysia) Lim YL | 19 | 18
Q4 | (Thailand) P Buranaprasertsuk (Thailand) B Ongbumrungpan | 21 | 21
(Chinese Taipei) Chen H-h (Chinese Taipei) Lai C-w | 21 | 21
PFQ | (Vietnam) Ton NKT (Vietnam) Thai VN | 15 | 12

Second Round
(Thailand) P Krajangjit (Thailand) L Narissapat | 21 | 21
7 | (Indonesia) S Andini (Indonesia) D Haris | 14 | 14
Q4 | (Thailand) P Buranaprasertsuk (Thailand) B Ongbumrungpan | 21 | 21 | 21
(Chinese Taipei) Chen H-h (Chinese Taipei) Lai C-w | 23 | 18 | 18

Quarterfinals
(Thailand) P Krajangjit (Thailand) L Narissapat | 16 | 16
Q4 | (Thailand) P Buranaprasertsuk (Thailand) B Ongbumrungpan | 21 | 21

== Mixed doubles ==
=== Seeds ===
1. (Thailand) Maneepong Jongjit / Savitree Amitrapai (withdrew)
2. (Singapore) Danny Bawa Chrisnanta / Vanessa Neo Yu Yan (first round)
3. (Indonesia) Fran Kurniawan / Shendy Puspa Irawati (semi-final)
4. (Indonesia) Irfan Fadhilah / Weni Anggraini (first round)
5. (Thailand) Thitipong Lapoe / Peeraya Munkitamorn (quarter-final)
6. (Malaysia) Tan Aik Quan / Lai Pei Jing (final)
7. (Indonesia) Riky Widianto / Richi Puspita Dili (quarter-final)
8. (South Korea) Kim Sa-rang / Choi Hye-in (first round)

=== Finals ===
Semifinals
6 | (Malaysia) Tan Aik Quan (Malaysia) Lai Pei Jing | 23 | 21
3 | (Indonesia) Fran Kurniawan (Indonesia) Shendy Puspa Irawati | 21 | 20
(Malaysia) Ong Jian Guo (Malaysia) Lim Yin Loo | 21 | 15 | 18
(Indonesia) Markis Kido (Indonesia) Pia Zebadiah | 10 | 21 | 21

Final
6 | (Malaysia) Tan Aik Quan (Malaysia) Lai Pei Jing | 21 | 8
(Indonesia) Markis Kido (Indonesia) Pia Zebadiah | 23 | 21

=== Top half ===
==== Section 1 ====
First Round
PFQ | (Chinese Taipei) Liao K-h (Chinese Taipei) Sung S-y | 18 | 21 | 10
(Malaysia) Tan YJ (Malaysia) Chong SC | 21 | 18 | 21
(Malaysia) B Wong (Malaysia) Soong FC | 17 | 23 | 16
(South Korea) Lee S-j (South Korea) Kim S-y | 21 | 21 | 21
6 | (Malaysia) Tan AQ (Malaysia) Lai PJ | 21 | 21
(Thailand) V Nilyoke (Thailand) C Chaladchalam | 13 | 15
(Singapore) Liu Y (Singapore) Thng TT | 17 | 18
(Thailand) S Anugritayawon (Thailand) L Narissapat | 21 | 21

Second Round
(Malaysia) Tan YJ (Malaysia) Chong SC | 21 | 16
(South Korea) Lee S-j (South Korea) Kim S-y | 21 | 21
6 | (Malaysia) Tan AQ (Malaysia) Lai PJ | 21 | 21
(Thailand) S Anugritayawon (Thailand) L Narissapat | 6 | 11

Quarterfinals
(South Korea) Lee S-j (South Korea) Kim S-y | 20 | 8
6 | (Malaysia) Tan AQ (Malaysia) Lai PJ | 22 | 21

==== Section 2 ====
First Round
3 | (Indonesia) F Kurniawan (Indonesia) S Irawati | 21 | 21
PFQ | (Malaysia) Tan WG (Malaysia) Chow MK | 19 | 18
PFQ | (Thailand) P Chalardchaleam (Thailand) J Kittiharakul | 21 | 21
(Thailand) N Puangpuapech (Thailand) R Chuthabunditkul | 13 | 16
7 | (Indonesia) R Widianto (Indonesia) R Dili | 21 | 21
(Singapore) T Yeo (Singapore) D Yuliana | 15 | 19
(Malaysia) Tan WK (Malaysia) V Hoo | 21 | 21
(Chinese Taipei) Liao C-c (Chinese Taipei) Chang Y-l | 12 | 7

Second Round
3 | (Indonesia) F Kurniawan (Indonesia) S Irawati | 21 | 12 | 21
PFQ | (Thailand) P Chalardchaleam (Thailand) J Kittiharakul | 18 | 21 | 15
7 | (Indonesia) R Widianto (Indonesia) R Dili | 21 | 21
(Malaysia) Tan WK (Malaysia) V Hoo | 22 | 17

Quarterfinals
3 | (Indonesia) F Kurniawan (Indonesia) S Irawati | 20 | 24 | 21
(Indonesia) R Widianto (Indonesia) R Dili | 22 | 22 | 13

=== Bottom half ===
==== Section 3 ====
First Round
Q3 | (Indonesia) P Rhoma (Indonesia) R Pradipta | 21 | 21
Q4 | (Malaysia) Tai AK (Malaysia) Lee MY | 15 | 10
(Malaysia) F Tazari (Indonesia) K Hanadia | 16 | 21 | 21
8 | (South Korea) Kim S-r (South Korea) Choi H-i | 21 | 19 | 18
Q1 | (Thailand) S Matayanumati (Thailand) A Serithammarak | 15 | 12
(Chinese Taipei) Liang J-w (Chinese Taipei) Chien Y-c | 21 | 21
(Malaysia) Ong JG (Malaysia) Lim YL | 21 | 21
4 | (Indonesia) I Fadhilah (Indonesia) W Anggraini | 16 | 15

Second Round
Q3 | (Indonesia) P Rhoma (Indonesia) R Pradipta | 15 | 12
(Malaysia) F Tazari (Indonesia) K Hanadia | 21 | 21
(Chinese Taipei) Liang J-w (Chinese Taipei) Chien Y-c | 16 | 12
(Malaysia) Ong JG (Malaysia) Lim YL | 21 | 21

Quarterfinals
(Malaysia) F Tazari (Indonesia) K Hanadia | 18 | 21 | 20
(Malaysia) Ong JG (Malaysia) Lim YL | 21 | 8 | 22

==== Section 4 ====
First Round
(Malaysia) R Abdul Latif (Indonesia) D Permatasari | 21 | 17 | 21
(Malaysia) Wong FY (Malaysia) Lai SJ | 17 | 21 | 14
(Chinese Taipei) Su Y-n (Chinese Taipei) Lai C-w | 6 | 14
5 | (Thailand) T Lapoe (Thailand) P Munkitamorn | 21 | 21
Q2 | (Chinese Taipei) Wang C-l (Chinese Taipei) Chen S-y | 19 | 21 | 11
(Chinese Taipei) Lin Y-j (Chinese Taipei) Wu T-j | 21 | 12 | 21
(Indonesia) M Kido (Indonesia) P Zebadiah | 21 | 21
2 | (Singapore) D Chrisnanta (Singapore) V Neo | 12 | 17

Second Round
(Malaysia) R Abdul Latif (Indonesia) D Permatasari | 17 | 16
5 | (Thailand) T Lapoe (Thailand) P Munkitamorn | 21 | 21
(Chinese Taipei) Lin Y-j (Chinese Taipei) Wu T-j | 12 | 18
(Indonesia) M Kido (Indonesia) P Zebadiah | 21 | 21

Quarterfinals
5 | (Thailand) T Lapoe (Thailand) P Munkitamorn | 21 | 11
(Indonesia) M Kido (Indonesia) P Zebadiah | 23 | 21

| Preceded by 2012 Canada Open Grand Prix | BWF Grand Prix Gold and Grand Prix; 2012 season | Succeeded by 2012 Indonesia Open Grand Prix Gold |
