= 2012 Korea Grand Prix Gold =

Tournament details
- Dates: 4–9 December
- Level: Grand Prix Gold
- Total prize money: US$120,000
- Venue: Lee Yongdae Gymnasium
- Location: Hwasun, South Korea

Champions
- Men's singles: (South Korea) Lee Dong-keun
- Women's singles: (South Korea) Sung Ji-hyun
- Men's doubles: (South Korea) Ko Sung-hyun (South Korea) Lee Yong-dae
- Women's doubles: (South Korea) Eom Hye-won (South Korea) Jang Ye-na
- Mixed doubles: (South Korea) Shin Baek-cheol (South Korea) Eom Hye-won

The 2012 Korea Grand Prix Gold was the fifteenth badminton tournament of the 2012 BWF Grand Prix Gold and Grand Prix. The tournament was held in Lee Yongdae Gymnasium, Hwasun, South Korea from 4 to 9 December 2012 and had a total purse of $120,000.

== Men's singles ==
=== Seeds ===
1. (Malaysia) Mohd Arif Abdul Latif (semi-final)
2. (Sri Lanka) Niluka Karunaratne (quarter-final)
3. (France) Brice Leverdez (third round)
4. (Thailand) Tanongsak Saensomboonsuk (final)
5. (Singapore) Derek Wong Zi Liang (semi-final)
6. (Israel) Misha Zilberman (second round)
7. (Malaysia) Ramdan Misbun (second round)
8. (Malaysia) Iskandar Zulkarnain Zainuddin (third round)

=== Finals ===
Quarterfinals
1	(Malaysia) Mohd Arif Abdul Latif	21	21
(South Korea) Yim Jong-woo	16	16
(South Korea) Lee Dong-keun	21	21
(Indonesia) Riyanto Subagja	18	11
(Chinese Taipei) Shih Kuei-chun	21	20	19
4	(Thailand) Tanongsak Saensomboonsuk	10	22	21
5	(Singapore) Derek Wong Zi Liang	21	22
2	(Sri Lanka) Niluka Karunaratne	14	20

Semifinals
1	(Malaysia) Mohd Arif Abdul Latif	17	21	19
(South Korea) Lee Dong-keun	21	18	21
4	(Thailand) Tanongsak Saensomboonsuk	21	21
5	(Singapore) Derek Wong Zi Liang	16	14

Final
(South Korea) Lee Dong-keun	21	21
4	(Thailand) Tanongsak Saensomboonsuk	17	14

=== Top half ===
==== Section 1 ====
First Round
1	(Malaysia) A Abdul Latif
BYE
(South Korea) Cho S-j	8	14
(Japan) T Kotaka	21	21
(Mongolia) S Purevsuren	4	4
(South Korea) Park S-m	21	21
(South Korea) Yim S-k	15	15
(Thailand) P Poodchalat	21	21

Second Round
1	(Malaysia) A Abdul Latif	17	21	21
(Japan) T Kotaka	21	17	14
(South Korea) Park S-m	20	21	21
(Thailand) P Poodchalat	22	15	19

Third Round
1	(Malaysia) A Abdul Latif	21	21
(South Korea) Park S-m	19	16

==== Section 2 ====
First Round
6	(Israel) M Zilberman
BYE
(South Korea) Yim J-w	21	21
(Chinese Taipei) Wan C-h	18	10
(Mongolia) U Terbish	8	5
(South Korea) Han K-h	21	21
(South Korea) Lee C-h	21	21
(Chinese Taipei) Cheng P-w	11	17

Second Round
6	(Israel) M Zilberman	14	16
(South Korea) Yim J-w	21	21
(South Korea) Han K-h	21	21
(South Korea) Lee C-h	15	12

Third Round
(South Korea) Yim J-w	12	21	21
(South Korea) Han K-h	21	13	14

==== Section 3 ====
First Round
3	(France) B Leverdez
BYE
(Australia) M Fariman	15	11
(South Korea) Kim D-r	21	21
(South Korea) Jang Y-s	21	21
(Malaysia) Goh SH	12	15
(Philippines) A Gadi	8	15
(South Korea) Lee D-k	21	21

Second Round
3	(France) B Leverdez	21	12	21
(South Korea) Kim D-r	12	21	16
(South Korea) Jang Y-s	21	13	10
(South Korea) Lee D-k	19	21	21

Third Round
3	(France) B Leverdez	12	15
(South Korea) Lee D-k	21	21

==== Section 4 ====
First Round
8	(Malaysia) I Zainuddin
BYE
(South Korea) Yoon J-y	21	21
(Mongolia) T Munkhbat	3	5
(Chinese Taipei) Wang T-w	21	21
(South Korea) Jin J-h	15	11
(South Korea) Kim K-t	14	9
(Indonesia) R Subagja	21	21

Second Round
8	(Malaysia) I Zainuddin	21	22
(South Korea) Yoon J-y	6	20
(Chinese Taipei) Wang T-w	15	19
(Indonesia) R Subagja	21	21

Third Round
8	(Malaysia) I Zainuddin	18	14
(Indonesia) R Subagja	21	21

=== Bottom half ===
==== Section 5 ====
First Round
(South Korea) Joo H-j	21	14	19
(Chinese Taipei) Shih K-c	19	21	21
(South Korea) Song Y-j	14	10
(Netherlands) E Meijs	21	21
(Czech Republic) P Koukal	21	21
(South Korea) Lee H-j	18	15
BYE
7	(Malaysia) R Misbun

Second Round
(Chinese Taipei) Shih K-c	21	21
(Netherlands) E Meijs	11	13
(Czech Republic) P Koukal	21	24	21
7	(Malaysia) R Misbun	10	26	17

Third Round
(Chinese Taipei) Shih K-c	21	21
(Czech Republic) P Koukal	18	17

==== Section 6 ====
First Round
(South Korea) Ahn H-s	21	21
(Chinese Taipei) Yang C-h	17	18
(Finland) E Heino	12	15
(South Korea) Hong J-h	21	21
(Austria) R Gnedt	wo
(South Korea) Ha Y-w
BYE
4	(Thailand) T Saensomboonsuk

Second Round
(South Korea) Ahn H-s	16	16
(South Korea) Hong J-h	21	21
(South Korea) Ha Y-w	15	23	17
4	(Thailand) T Saensomboonsuk	21	21	21

Third Round
(South Korea) Hong J-h	17	17
4	(Thailand) T Saensomboonsuk	21	21

==== Section 7 ====
First Round
(Mongolia) B Munkhbat	4	5
(South Korea) Choi Y-w	21	21
(New Zealand) J Wu	21	21
(South Korea) Jung S-h	10	14
(Japan) S Miyamoto	23	19	21
(South Korea) Ahn B-k	21	21	18
BYE
5	(Singapore) D Wong

Second Round
(South Korea) Choi Y-w	15	21	21
(New Zealand) J Wu	21	13	11
(Japan) S Miyamoto	22	13	17
5	(Singapore) D Wong	20	21	21

Third Round
(South Korea) Choi Y-w	21	10
5	(Singapore) D Wong	23	21

==== Section 8 ====
First Round
(South Korea) Joo M-g	16	6
(Indonesia) W Prasetyo	21	21
(South Korea) Han S-y	14	21	8
(South Korea) Jung K-h	21	19	21
(South Korea) Kim M-k	17	21	21
(Uganda) E Ekiring	21	11	15
BYE
2	(Sri Lanka) N Karunaratne

Second Round
(Indonesia) W Prasetyo	21	19	21
(South Korea) Jung K-h	8	21	11
(South Korea) Kim M-k	18	11
2	(Sri Lanka) N Karunaratne	21	21

Third Round
(Indonesia) W Prasetyo	16	14
2	(Sri Lanka) N Karunaratne	21	21

== Women's singles ==
=== Seeds ===
1. (South Korea) Sung Ji-hyun (champion)
2. (Indonesia) Aprilia Yuswandari (final)
3. (Malaysia) Tee Jing Yi (withdrew)
4. (Malaysia) Sannatasah Saniru (first round)
5. (Malaysia) Lydia Cheah Li Ya (first round)
6. (Malaysia) Sonia Cheah Su Ya (semi-final)
7. (Singapore) Chen Jiayuan (quarter-final)
8. (Lithuania) Akvile Stapusaityte (first round)

=== Finals ===
Semifinals
1	(South Korea) Sung Ji-hyun	21	21
(South Korea) Kim Ye-ji	10	9
6	(Malaysia) Sonia Cheah Su Ya	13	21	14
2	(Indonesia) Aprilia Yuswandari	21	15	21

Final
1	(South Korea) Sung Ji-hyun	21	21
2	(Indonesia) Aprilia Yuswandari	10	10

=== Top half ===
==== Section 1 ====
First Round
1	(South Korea) Sung J-h	21	21
(Chinese Taipei) Chang Y-l	12	10
(South Korea) Jung N-r	21	21
Q1	(South Korea) Lee D-l	11	13
7	(Singapore) Chen JY	21	21
(South Korea) Ko H-j	9	11
(Japan) Y Kinoshita	17	15
(Indonesia) Y Asmarani	21	21

Second Round
1	(South Korea) Sung J-h	24	21
(South Korea) Jung N-r	22	12
7	(Singapore) Chen JY	21	21
(Indonesia) Y Asmarani	16	11

Quarterfinals
1	(South Korea) Sung J-h	21	21
7	(Singapore) Chen JY	10	6

==== Section 2 ====
First Round
4	(Malaysia) S Saniru	19	16
(South Korea) Kim S-j	21	21
Q3	(South Korea) Yang S-y	21	21
(Mongolia) K Baatar	1	2
8	(Lithuania) A Stapusaityte	14	18
(South Korea) Kim Y-j	21	21
(Indonesia) M Nadhir	21	21
(Estonia) G Saar	16	9

Second Round
(South Korea) Kim S-j	21	21
Q3	(South Korea) Yang S-y	9	14
(South Korea) Kim Y-j	21	13	21
(Indonesia) M Nadhir	17	21	13

Quarterfinals
(South Korea) Kim S-j	21	22	10
(South Korea) Kim Y-j	18	24	21

=== Bottom half ===
==== Section 3 ====
First Round
Q4	(South Korea) Lim E-h	23	10	21
(South Korea) Lee I-j	21	21	14
(South Korea) Jung M-j	21	16	14
6	(Malaysia) S Cheah	15	21	21
(Canada) C Tsai	21	21
Q2	(South Korea) Kim J-e	18	15
(Japan) M Takagi	21	21
PFQ	(Mongolia) M Mendjargal	3	6

Second Round
Q4	(South Korea) Lim E-h	4	6
6	(Malaysia) S Cheah	21	21
(Canada) C Tsai	14	15
(Japan) M Takagi	21	21

Quarterfinals
6	(Malaysia) S Cheah	21	21
(Japan) M Takagi	10	18

==== Section 4 ====
First Round
(Indonesia) R Suwarno	18	21	17
(Philippines) B Carlos	21	12	21
(Chinese Taipei) Cheng C-y	21	21
5	(Malaysia) L Cheah	19	12
(Malaysia) Yang LL	21	22
(South Korea) Choi M-j	10	20
(Russia) A Astrakhantseva	6	9
2	(Indonesia) A Yuswandari	21	21

Second Round
(Philippines) B Carlos	14	5
(Chinese Taipei) Cheng C-y	21	21
(Malaysia) Yang LL	14	14
2	(Indonesia) A Yuswandari	21	21

Quarterfinals
(Chinese Taipei) Cheng C-y	21	12	20
2	(Indonesia) A Yuswandari	17	21	22

== Men's doubles ==
=== Seeds ===
1. (South Korea) Kim Ki-jung / Kim Sa-rang (final)
2. (Austria) Jurgen Koch / Peter Zauner (withdrew)
3. (Canada) Adrian Liu / Derrick Ng (second round)
4. (Poland) Lukasz Moren / Wojciech Szkudlarczyk (second round)
5. (South Korea) Ko Sung-hyun / Lee Yong-dae (champion)
6. (Indonesia) Andrei Adistia / Christopher Rusdianto (first round)
7. (Malaysia) Nelson Heg Wei Keat / Teo Ee Yi (first round)
8. (Malaysia) Chooi Kah Ming / Ow Yao Han (quarter-final)

=== Finals ===
Semifinals
1	(South Korea) Kim Ki-jung (South Korea) Kim Sa-rang	21	21
(Chinese Taipei) Liang Jui-wei (Chinese Taipei) Liao Kuan-hao	19	15
5	(South Korea) Ko Sung-hyun (South Korea) Lee Yong-dae	21	21
(Malaysia) Goh V Shem (Malaysia) Ong Jian Guo	11	16

Final
1	(South Korea) Kim Ki-jung (South Korea) Kim Sa-rang	12	11
5	(South Korea) Ko Sung-hyun (South Korea) Lee Yong-dae	21	21

=== Top half ===
==== Section 1 ====
First Round
1	(South Korea) Kim K-j (South Korea) Kim S-r	21	21
(Malaysia) L Abdul Khalid (Malaysia) Teo KS	12	16
(Malaysia) R Abdul Latif (Malaysia) J Singh	16	21	21
(Japan) T Kotaka (Japan) S Miyamoto	21	18	12
8	(Malaysia) Chooi KM (Malaysia) Ow YH	22	21
(South Korea) Kang J-w (South Korea) Lee S-j	20	16
Q1	(South Korea) Han S-y (South Korea) Jin J-h	17	19
(South Korea) Kim K-s (South Korea) Na J-y	21	21

Second Round
1	(South Korea) Kim K-j (South Korea) Kim S-r	21	21
(Malaysia) R Abdul Latif (Malaysia) J Singh	10	13
8	(Malaysia) Chooi KM (Malaysia) Ow YH	17	21	21
(South Korea) Kim K-s (South Korea) Na J-y	21	10	10

Quarterfinals
1	(South Korea) Kim K-j (South Korea) Kim S-r	21	21
8	(Malaysia) Chooi KM (Malaysia) Ow YH	13	18

==== Section 2 ====
First Round
3	(Canada) A Liu (Canada) D Ng	21	21
(Chinese Taipei) Wan C-h (Chinese Taipei) Wang T-w	13	10
Q4	(South Korea) Cho S-j (South Korea) Lee J-w	13	9
(Chinese Taipei) Liang J-w (Chinese Taipei) Liao K-h	21	21
6	(Indonesia) A Adistia (Indonesia) C Rusdianto	19	14
(South Korea) Lee H-h (South Korea) Song C-y	21	21
Q2	(South Korea) Jung S-h (South Korea) Kim S-h	20	21	19
(South Korea) Han K-s (South Korea) Kim D-s	22	19	21

Second Round
3	(Canada) A Liu (Canada) D Ng	15	16
(Chinese Taipei) Liang J-w (Chinese Taipei) Liao K-h	21	21
(South Korea) Lee H-h (South Korea) Song C-y	21	21
(South Korea) Han K-s (South Korea) Kim D-s	13	15

Quarterfinals
(Chinese Taipei) Liang J-w (Chinese Taipei) Liao K-h	19	21	21
(South Korea) Lee H-h (South Korea) Song C-y	21	15	17

=== Bottom half ===
==== Section 3 ====
First Round
(Philippines) K Asuncion (Philippines) A Gadi	17	9
(South Korea) Shin B-c (South Korea) Yoo Y-s	21	21
(Chinese Taipei) Chen C-j (Chinese Taipei) Huang P-y	7	13
5	(South Korea) Ko S-h (South Korea) Lee Y-d	21	21
(South Korea) Cho G-w (South Korea) Kim D-e	21	21
Q3	(South Korea) Choi S-i (South Korea) Kim S-h	16	13
(Chinese Taipei) Wang C-l (Chinese Taipei) Wu H-l	21	16	15
4	(Poland) L Moren (Poland) W Szkudlarczyk	17	21	21

Second Round
(South Korea) Shin B-c (South Korea) Yoo Y-s	21	8	12
5	(South Korea) Ko S-h (South Korea) Lee Y-d	14	21	21
(South Korea) Cho G-w (South Korea) Kim D-e	23	19	21
4	(Poland) L Moren (Poland) W Szkudlarczyk	21	21	15

Quarterfinals
5	(South Korea) Ko S-h (South Korea) Lee Y-d	21	21
(South Korea) Cho G-w (South Korea) Kim D-e	11	11

==== Section 4 ====
First Round
(Mongolia) B Munkhbat (Mongolia) T Munkhbat	5	9
(Chinese Taipei) Lin Y-j (Chinese Taipei) Lu C-b	21	21
(Indonesia) B Angriawan (Indonesia) Y Sugiarto	24	21
7	(Malaysia) N Heg (Malaysia) Teo EY	22	18
(Malaysia) Goh VS (Malaysia) Ong JG	21	21
(Chinese Taipei) Huang C-e (Chinese Taipei) Tsai C-l	16	14
(South Korea) Jung K-h (South Korea) Lee H-j	21	14	12
PFQ	(South Korea) Bae K-y (South Korea) Han T-s	16	21	21

Second Round
(Chinese Taipei) Lin Y-j (Chinese Taipei) Lu C-b	23	21
(Indonesia) B Angriawan (Indonesia) Y Sugiarto	21	18
(Malaysia) Goh VS (Malaysia) Ong JG	21	19	21
PFQ	(South Korea) Bae K-y (South Korea) Han T-s	12	21	15

Quarterfinals
(Chinese Taipei) Lin Y-j (Chinese Taipei) Lu C-b	21	13	16
(Malaysia) Goh VS (Malaysia) Ong JG	16	21	21

== Women's doubles ==
=== Seeds ===
1. (South Korea) Eom Hye-won / Jang Ye-na (champion)
2. (South Korea) Choi Hye-in / Kim So-young (second round)
3. (South Korea) Lee So-hee / Shin Seung-chan (final)
4. (Malaysia) Chow Mei Kuan / Lee Meng Yean (second round)

=== Finals ===
Semifinals
1	(South Korea) Eom Hye-won (South Korea) Jang Ye-na	21	21
(South Korea) Ko A-ra (South Korea) Yoo Hae-won	15	9
3	(South Korea) Lee So-hee (South Korea) Shin Seung-chan	21	21
(Macau) Wang Rong (Macau) Zhang Zhibo	18	19

Final
1	(South Korea) Eom Hye-won (South Korea) Jang Ye-na	21	21
3	(South Korea) Lee So-hee (South Korea) Shin Seung-chan	13	17

=== Top half ===
==== Section 1 ====
First Round
1	(South Korea) Eom H-w (South Korea) Jang Y-n
BYE
(South Korea) Lee B-r (South Korea) Lim E-h
BYE
(Indonesia) S Aulia (Indonesia) A Awanda
BYE
(Canada) J Ko (Canada) C Tsai	21	21
(Japan) Y Kinoshita (Japan) M Takagi	11	15

Second Round
1	(South Korea) Eom H-w (South Korea) Jang Y-n	21	21
(South Korea) Lee B-r (South Korea) Lim E-h	9	4
(Indonesia) S Aulia (Indonesia) A Awanda	21	21
(Canada) J Ko (Canada) C Tsai	9	14

Quarterfinals
1	(South Korea) Eom H-w (South Korea) Jang Y-n	21	21
(Indonesia) S Aulia (Indonesia) A Awanda	12	16

==== Section 2 ====
First Round
4	(Malaysia) Chow MK (Malaysia) Lee MY
BYE
(South Korea) Ko A-r (South Korea) Yoo H-w
BYE
(South Korea) Jung G-h (South Korea) Jung Y-y
BYE
(Chinese Taipei) Chien Y-c (Chinese Taipei) Wu T-j	10	21	21
(South Korea) Lee S-r (South Korea) Lim S-b	21	18	18

Second Round
4	(Malaysia) Chow MK (Malaysia) Lee MY	9	15
(South Korea) Ko A-r (South Korea) Yoo H-w	21	21
(South Korea) Jung G-h (South Korea) Jung Y-y	10	3
(Chinese Taipei) Chien Y-c (Chinese Taipei) Wu T-j	21	21

Quarterfinals
(South Korea) Ko A-r (South Korea) Yoo H-w	21	21
(Chinese Taipei) Chien Y-c (Chinese Taipei) Wu T-j	12	17

=== Bottom half ===
==== Section 3 ====
First Round
(Chinese Taipei) Chang Y-l (Chinese Taipei) Cheng C-y	11	16
(South Korea) Ko H-j (South Korea) Yoon Y-s	21	21
BYE
(South Korea) Kim C-m (South Korea) Yang R-s
BYE
(Chinese Taipei) Chen P-j (Chinese Taipei) Huang H-h
BYE
3	(South Korea) Lee S-h (South Korea) Shin S-c

Second Round
(South Korea) Ko H-j (South Korea) Yoon Y-s	21	21
(South Korea) Kim C-m (South Korea) Yang R-s	16	15
(Chinese Taipei) Chen P-j (Chinese Taipei) Huang H-h	9	7
3	(South Korea) Lee S-h (South Korea) Shin S-c	21	21

Quarterfinals
(South Korea) Ko H-j (South Korea) Yoon Y-s	14	17
3	(South Korea) Lee S-h (South Korea) Shin S-c	21	21

==== Section 4 ====
First Round
(Mongolia) K Baatar (Mongolia) M Mendjargal	2	7
(Indonesia) D Medita (Indonesia) K Rosmini	21	21
BYE
(South Korea) Lee N-r (South Korea) Yang S-y
BYE
(Macau) Wang R (Macau) Zhang ZB
BYE
2	(South Korea) Choi H-i (South Korea) Kim S-y

Second Round
(Indonesia) D Medita (Indonesia) K Rosmini	21	21
(South Korea) Lee N-r (South Korea) Yang S-y	12	8
(Macau) Wang R (Macau) Zhang ZB	5	21	21
2	(South Korea) Choi H-i (South Korea) Kim S-y	21	10	14

Quarterfinals
(Indonesia) D Medita (Indonesia) K Rosmini	10	15
(Macau) Wang R (Macau) Zhang ZB	21	21

== Mixed doubles ==
=== Seeds ===
1. (South Korea) Yoo Yeon-seong / Jang Ye-na (final)
2. (Indonesia) Irfan Fadhilah / Weni Anggraini (semi-final)
3. (Indonesia) Alfian Eko Prasetya / Gloria Emanuelle Widjaja (second round)
4. (South Korea) Shin Baek-cheol / Eom Hye-won (champion)

=== Finals ===
Semifinals
1	(South Korea) Yoo Yeon-seong (South Korea) Jang Ye-na	21	21
(Chinese Taipei) Liao Kuan-hao (Chinese Taipei) Chien Yu-chin	12	17
4	(South Korea) Shin Baek-cheol (South Korea) Eom Hye-won	19	21	21
2	(Indonesia) Irfan Fadhilah (Indonesia) Weni Anggraini	21	11	18

Final
1	(South Korea) Yoo Yeon-seong (South Korea) Jang Ye-na	21	18	23
4	(South Korea) Shin Baek-cheol (South Korea) Eom Hye-won	11	21	25

=== Top half ===
==== Section 1 ====
First Round
1	(South Korea) Yoo Y-s (South Korea) Jang Y-n
BYE
(Chinese Taipei) Tsai C-l (Chinese Taipei) Huang H-h	21	13	21
(South Korea) Kim D-s (South Korea) Choi M-j	15	21	15
(South Korea) Lee S-j (South Korea) Kim S-y	21	23
(New Zealand) J Wu (Chinese Taipei) Chang Y-l	9	21
(Mongolia) D Uuganbayar (Mongolia) M Mendjargal	6	5
(South Korea) Han K-s (South Korea) Lee B-r	21	21

Second Round
1	(South Korea) Yoo Y-s (South Korea) Jang Y-n	21	21
(Chinese Taipei) Tsai C-l (Chinese Taipei) Huang H-h	8	12
(South Korea) Lee S-j (South Korea) Kim S-y	21	21
(South Korea) Han K-s (South Korea) Lee B-r	15	15

Quarterfinals
1	(South Korea) Yoo Y-s (South Korea) Jang Y-n	21	21
(South Korea) Lee S-j (South Korea) Kim S-y	16	17

==== Section 2 ====
First Round
3	(Indonesia) A Prasetya (Indonesia) G Widjaja
BYE
(Chinese Taipei) Liao K-h (Chinese Taipei) Chien Y-c	21	21
(South Korea) Lee J-w (South Korea) Yang S-y	10	11
(Poland) L Moren (South Korea) Lim S-b	21	21
(Mongolia) T Munkhbat (Mongolia) D Munkhbayar	4	6
(Poland) W Szkudlarczyk (South Korea) Lee S-r	21	21
(Israel) M Zilberman (Israel) S Zilberman	15	17

Second Round
3	(Indonesia) A Prasetya (Indonesia) G Widjaja	15	16
(Chinese Taipei) Liao K-h (Chinese Taipei) Chien Y-c	21	21
(Poland) L Moren (South Korea) Lim S-b	15	21	19
(Poland) W Szkudlarczyk (South Korea) Lee S-r	21	16	21

Quarterfinals
(Chinese Taipei) Liao K-h (Chinese Taipei) Chien Y-c	22	21
(Poland) W Szkudlarczyk (South Korea) Lee S-r	20	10

=== Bottom half ===
==== Section 3 ====
First Round
(South Korea) Kim D-e (South Korea) Yoo H-w	21	8	21
(Indonesia) L Nugroho (Indonesia) A Saufika	18	21	15
(South Korea) Han T-s (South Korea) Kim C-m	21	21
(Mongolia) B Munkhbat (Mongolia) K Baatar	4	2
(South Korea) Bae K-y (South Korea) Shin S-c	23	18
(Chinese Taipei) Lu C-b (Chinese Taipei) Cheng C-y	25	21
BYE
4	(South Korea) Shin B-c (South Korea) Eom H-w

Second Round
(South Korea) Kim D-e (South Korea) Yoo H-w	21	21
(South Korea) Han T-s (South Korea) Kim C-m	12	12
(Chinese Taipei) Lu C-b (Chinese Taipei) Cheng C-y	21	20	16
4	(South Korea) Shin B-c (South Korea) Eom H-w	19	22	21

Quarterfinals
(South Korea) Kim D-e (South Korea) Yoo H-w	21	16	18
4	(South Korea) Shin B-c (South Korea) Eom H-w	19	21	21

==== Section 4 ====
First Round
(South Korea) Kang J-w (South Korea) Choi H-i	21	21
(Indonesia) M Nugraha (Indonesia) S Wulansari	9	8
(Chinese Taipei) Lin Y-j (Chinese Taipei) Wu T-j	21	21
(Philippines) K Asuncion (Philippines) B Carlos	19	9
(Chinese Taipei) Yang C-h (Chinese Taipei) Chen P-j	21	15
(South Korea) Jang S-h (South Korea) Ko H-j	23	21
BYE
2	(Indonesia) I Fadhilah (Indonesia) W Anggraini

Second Round
(South Korea) Kang J-w (South Korea) Choi H-i	20	21	23
(Chinese Taipei) Lin Y-j (Chinese Taipei) Wu T-j	22	13	21
(South Korea) Jang S-h (South Korea) Ko H-j	16	21	16
2	(Indonesia) I Fadhilah (Indonesia) W Anggraini	21	11	21

Quarterfinals
(South Korea) Kang J-w (South Korea) Choi H-i	22	21
2	(Indonesia) I Fadhilah (Indonesia) W Anggraini	24	23

Preceded by 2012 Macau Open Grand Prix Gold	BWF Grand Prix Gold and Grand Prix; 2012 season	Succeeded by 2012 India Open Grand Prix Gold
