= 2012 Hong Kong Super Series =

Tournament details
- Dates: 20–25 November 2012
- Total prize money: US$350,000
- Location: Kowloon

The 2012 Hong Kong Super Series is a top level badminton competition held from November 20, 2012, to November 25, 2012, in Kowloon, Hong Kong. It is the twelfth BWF Super Series competition on the 2012 BWF Super Series schedule. The total purse for the event was $350,000.

== Men's singles ==
=== Seeds ===
1. (Malaysia) Lee Chong Wei
2. (China) Chen Long
3. (China) Chen Jin
4. (China) Du Pengyu
5. (Japan) Sho Sasaki
6. (Japan) Kenichi Tago
7. (Denmark) Jan Ø. Jørgensen
8. (Vietnam) Nguyen Tien Minh

=== Top half ===
First Round
1	(Malaysia) Lee C W	21	21
(Thailand) B Ponsana	15	15
(India) A Jayaram	22	23
(China) Wang ZM	20	21
8	(Vietnam) Nguyen T M	21	21
Q1	(Hong Kong) Ng K L	13	18
(Chinese Taipei) Hsu J-h	21	21
Q4	(China) Chen YK	17	12
4	(China) Du PY	17	20
(Hong Kong) Hu Y	21	22
PFQ	(Malaysia) M A A Latif	21	21
(Russia) V Ivanov	18	8
6	(Japan) K Tago	21	21
(Malaysia) Chong W F	18	9
(Japan) T Ueda	19	23	21
(Indonesia) T Hidayat	21	21	16

Second Round
1	(Malaysia) Lee C W	21	21
(India) A Jayaram	18	19
8	(Vietnam) Nguyen T M	22	21	21
(Chinese Taipei) Hsu J-h	24	18	14
(Hong Kong) Hu Y	17	17
PFQ	(Malaysia) M A A Latif	21	21
6	(Japan) K Tago	21	21
(Japan) T Ueda	17	12

Quarterfinals
1	(Malaysia) Lee C W	21	21
8	(Vietnam) Nguyen T M	18	19
PFQ	(Malaysia) M A A Latif	12	15
6	(Japan) K Tago	21	21

Semifinals
1	(Malaysia) Lee C W	21	21
6	(Japan) K Tago	19	15

=== Bottom half ===
First Round
(Hong Kong) Wong W K	12	21	15
(Indonesia) T Sugiarto	21	10	21
(India) P Kashyap	24	20	22
7	(Denmark) J Ø Jørgensen	22	22	20
(Indonesia) S D Kuncoro	10	14
(Denmark) H-K Vittinghus	21	21
(Germany) M Zwiebler	21	21
3	(China) Chen J	14	14
Q2	(Hong Kong) Chan Y K	18	15
(Denmark) V Axelsen	21	21
(England) R Ouseph	13	16
5	(Japan) S Sasaki	21	21
(Malaysia) D Liew	23	24
(Indonesia) D H Rumbaka	21	22
Q3	(Indonesia) A K Tedjono	10	13
2	(China) Chen L	21	21

Second Round
(Indonesia) T Sugiarto	11
(India) P Kashyap	6^{r}
(Denmark) H-K Vittinghus	16	19
(Germany) M Zwiebler	21	21
(Denmark) V Axelsen	20	18
5	(Japan) S Sasaki	22	21
(Malaysia) D Liew	8	13
2	(China) Chen L	21	21

Quarterfinals
(Indonesia) T Sugiarto	21	19	21
(Germany) M Zwiebler	17	21	17
5	(Japan) S Sasaki	16	12
2	(China) Chen L	21	21

Semifinals
(Indonesia) T Sugiarto	18	10
2	(China) Chen L	21	21

=== Finals ===
Semifinals
1	(Malaysia) Lee Chong Wei	21	21
6	(Japan) Kenichi Tago	19	15
(Indonesia) Tommy Sugiarto	18	10
2	(China) Chen Long	21	21

Final
1	(Malaysia) Lee Chong Wei	19	17
2	(China) Chen Long	21	21

== Women's singles ==
=== Seeds ===
1. (China) Wang Yihan
2. (China) Li Xuerui
3. (India) Saina Nehwal
4. (China) Wang Shixian
5. (Germany) Juliane Schenk
6. (Denmark) Tine Baun
7. (China) Jiang Yanjiao
8. (South Korea) Sung Ji-hyun

=== Top half ===
First Round
1	(China) Wang YH	21	21
Q4	(Japan) K Imabeppu	9	19
(Japan) M Mitani	21	21
(Thailand) S Taerattanachai	8	19
8	(South Korea) Sung J-h	13	21	21
(Hong Kong) Yip P Y	21	19	14
(Chinese Taipei) Pai H-m	11
(Indonesia) D Hera	3^{r}
4	(China) Wang SX	21	21
(Russia) A Prokopenko	14	11
(Thailand) P Buranaprasertsuk	22	21
(Hong Kong) Chan T K	20	15
5	(Germany) J Schenk	14	21	21
(Chinese Taipei) Tai T-y	21	17	8
(China) Chen XJ	21	16	22
(Indonesia) L Fanetri	16	21	20

Second Round
1	(China) Y Wang	21	12
(Japan) M Mitani	19	10^{r}
8	(South Korea) Sung J-h	14	21	19
(Chinese Taipei) Pai H-m	21	9	21
4	(China) Wang SX	17	21	21
(Thailand) P Buranaprasertsuk	21	12	23
5	(Germany) J Schenk	14	22
(China) Chen XJ	21	21^{r}

Quarterfinals
1	(China) Wang YH	20	21	21
(Chinese Taipei) Pai H-m	22	11	16
(Thailand) P Buranaprasertsuk	16	16
5	(Germany) J Schenk	21	21

Semifinals
1	(China) Wang YH	21	19	21
5	(Germany) J Schenk	8	21	15

=== Bottom half ===
First Round
(Thailand) R Inthanon	11	21	17
(Indonesia) A Firdasari	21	10	21
(Japan) E Hirose	19	22	21
7	(China) Jiang YJ	21	20	18
Q1	(China) Wang L	21	21
(Singapore) Gu J	15	19
PFQ	(Indonesia) A Yuswandari	20	8
3	(India) S Nehwal	22	21
(Netherlands) Yao J	8	22	19
(Thailand) B Ongbumrungpan	21	20	21
Q3	(Thailand) N Jindapon	10	15
6	(Denmark) T Baun	21	21
(India) P. V. Sindhu	12	21	15
Q2	(Indonesia) B Manuputi	21	18	21
(Singapore) Fu MT	12	12
2	(China) Li XR	21	21

Second Round
(Indonesia) A Firdasari	21	21
(Japan) E Hirose	17	19
Q1	(China) Wang L	21	21
3	(India) Saina Nehwal	19	15
(Thailand) B Ongbumrungpan	8	15
6	(Denmark) T Baun	21	21
Q2	(Indonesia) B Manuputi	14	13
2	(China) Li XR	21	21

Quarterfinals
(Indonesia) A Firdasari	12	19
Q1	(China) Wang L	21	21
6	(Denmark) T Baun
2	(China) Li XR	w	/	o

Semifinals
Q1	(China) Wang L	12	13
2	(China) Li XR	21	21

=== Finals ===
Semifinals
1	(China) Wang Yihan	21	19	21
5	(Germany) Juliane Schenk	8	21	15
Q1	(China) Wang Lin	12	13
2	(China) Li Xuerui	21	21

Final
1	(China) Wang Yihan	12	3^{r}
2	(China) Li Xuerui	21	11

== Men's doubles ==
=== Seeds ===
1. (Malaysia) Koo Kien Keat / Tan Boon Heong
2. (China) Cai Yun / Fu Haifeng
3. (South Korea) Kim Ki-jung / Kim Sa-rang
4. (Thailand) Bodin Issara / Maneepong Jongjit
5. (Japan) Hiroyuki Endo / Kenichi Hayakawa
6. (China) Hong Wei / Shen Ye
7. (Japan) Hirokatsu Hashimoto / Noriyasu Hirata
8. (Indonesia) Angga Pratama / Rian Agung Saputro

=== Top half ===
First Round
1	(Malaysia) Koo K K (Malaysia) Tan B H	21	21
(Thailand) P Chalardchaleam (Thailand) N Puangpuapech	15	17
(England) C Adcock (England) A Ellis	21	21
(India) K Tarun (India) A Vishnu	18	14
8	(Indonesia) A Pratama (Indonesia) R A Saputro	21	21
(France) B Careme (France) G Mittelheiser	14	14
Q4	(South Korea) Lee Y-d (South Korea) Ko S-h	21	21
(Russia) V Ivanov (Russia) I Sozonov	13	15
4	(Thailand) B Issara (Thailand) M Jongjit	18	10
(Chinese Taipei) Lee S-m (Chinese Taipei) Tsai C-h	21	21
(Indonesia) A Y Chandra (Indonesia) M Kido	11	21	21
Q3	(India) M Attri (India) S Reddy B.	21	11	15
5	(Japan) H Endo (Japan) K Hayakawa	21	21
(Denmark) C J Skovgård (Denmark) M Pieler Kolding	19	16
(Malaysia) Gan T C (Malaysia) Ong S H	18	17
(Indonesia) B Septano (Indonesia) A Y Wirawan	21	21

Second Round
1	(Malaysia) Koo K K (Malaysia) Tan B H	25	21
(England) C Adcock (England) A Ellis	23	17
8	(Indonesia) A Pratama (Indonesia) R A Saputro	18	16
Q4	(South Korea) Ko S-h (South Korea) Lee Y-d	21	21
(Chinese Taipei) Lee S-m (Chinese Taipei) Tsai C-h	21	21
(Indonesia) A Y Chandra (Indonesia) M Kido	17	13
5	(Japan) H Endo (Japan) K Hayakawa	21	21
(Indonesia) B Septano (Indonesia) A Y Wirawan	19	16

Quarterfinals
1	(Malaysia) Koo K K (Malaysia) Tan B H	w	/	o
Q4	(South Korea) Ko S-h (South Korea) Lee Y-d
(Chinese Taipei) Lee S-m (Chinese Taipei) Tsai C-h	14	21	21
5	(Japan) H Endo (Japan) K Hayakawa	21	16	16

Semifinals
1	(Malaysia) Koo K K (Malaysia) Tan B H	22	21
(Chinese Taipei) Lee S-m (Chinese Taipei) Tsai C-h	20	13

=== Bottom half ===
First Round
Q2	(Chinese Taipei) Chen H-l (Chinese Taipei) Lu C-b	16	21	19
(Malaysia) Hoon T H (Malaysia) Tan W K	21	17	21
(Indonesia) Y S Dasaki (Indonesia) H A Gunawan	15	21	21
7	(Japan) H Hashimoto (Japan) N Hirata	21	16	19
Q1	(Chinese Taipei) Chen C-j (Chinese Taipei) Lin Y-j	21	21
(United States) P Chew (United States) S Pongnairat	12	19
(China) Liu XL (China) Qiu ZH	17	21	21
3	(South Korea) Kim K-j (South Korea) Kim S-r	21	10	17
(Germany) I Kindervater (Germany) J Schöttler	21	14	14
(Indonesia) M Ahsan (Indonesia) H Setiawan	18	21	21
(South Korea) Shin B-c (South Korea) Yoo Y-s	21	13	21
6	(China) Hong W (China) Shen Y	12	21	10
(Indonesia) H Faisal (Indonesia) P E Rhoma	16	23	17
(India) P J Chopra (India) A Dewalker	21	21	21
(Malaysia) Goh V S (Malaysia) Ong J G	17	16
2	(China) Cai Y (China) Fu HF	21	21

Second Round
(Malaysia) Hoon T H (Malaysia) Tan W K	21	21
(Indonesia) Y S Dasaki (Indonesia) H A Gunawan	19	19
Q1	(Chinese Taipei) Chen C-j (Chinese Taipei) Lin Y-j	11	13
(China) Liu XL (China) Qiu ZH	21	21
(Indonesia) M Ahsan (Indonesia) H Setiawan	21	21
(South Korea) Shin B-c (South Korea) Yoo Y-s	14	13
(India) P J Chopra (India) A Dewalker	21	21	6
2	(China) Cai Y (China) Fu HF	23	19	21

Quarterfinals
(Malaysia) Hoon T H (Malaysia) Tan W K	27	21	13
(China) Liu XL (China) Qiu ZH	25	23	21
(Indonesia) M Ahsan (Indonesia) H Setiawan	17	15
2	(China) Cai Y (China) Fu HF	21	21

Semifinals
(China) Liu XL (China) Qiu ZH	21	17	16
(China) Cai Y (China) Fu HF	18	21	21

=== Finals ===
Semifinals
1	(Malaysia) Koo Kien Keat (Malaysia) Tan Boon Heong	22	21
(Chinese Taipei) Lee Sheng-mu (Chinese Taipei) Tsai Chia-hsin	20	13
(China) Liu Xiaolong (China) Qiu Zihan	21	17	16
2	(China) Cai Yun (China) Fu Haifeng	18	21	21

Final
1	(Malaysia) Koo Kien Keat (Malaysia) Tan Boon Heong	16	17
2	(China) Cai Yun (China) Fu Haifeng	21	21

== Women's doubles ==
=== Seeds ===
1. (China) Tian Qing / Zhao Yunlei
2. (China) Wang Xiaoli / Yu Yang
3. (Denmark) Christinna Pedersen / Joachim Fischer Nielsen
4. (Japan) Shizuka Matsuo / Mami Naito
5. (Japan) Misaki Matsutomo / Ayaka Takahashi
6. (South Korea) Eom Hye-won / Jang Ye-na
7. (China) Bao Yixin / Tang Jinhua
8. (Singapore) Shinta Mulia Sari / Yao Lei

=== Top half ===
First Round
1	(China) Tian Q (China) Zhao YL	21	21
(United States) E Lee (United States) P L Obanana	10	13
(Indonesia) S R Andini (Indonesia) D D Haris	21	21
Q2	(Chinese Taipei) Hung S-c (Chinese Taipei) Wu F-c	13	12
5	(Japan) M Matsutomo (Japan) A Takahashi	21	21
(Thailand) S Amitrapai (Thailand) S Taerattanachai	8	16
(Indonesia) P Z Bernadeth (Indonesia) R A Pradipta	18	17
(Chinese Taipei) Chiang K-h (Chinese Taipei) Tsai P-l	21	17
3	(Denmark) C Pedersen (Denmark) K Rytter Juhl	21	20	18
(Malaysia) Goh L Y (Malaysia) Lim Y L	12	22	21
(Indonesia) M Jauhari (Indonesia) G Polii	21	21
(Russia) T Bibik (Russia) A Chervaikova	10	15
7	(China) Bao YX (China) Tang JH	22	21
(Hong Kong) Poon L Y (Hong Kong) Tse Y S	20	12
(Sweden) E Lennartsson (Sweden) E Wengberg	24	21
PFQ	(Hong Kong) Chan H Y (Hong Kong) Chau H W	22	11

Second Round
1	(China) Tian Q (China) Zhao YL	23	21
(Indonesia) S R Andini (Indonesia) D D Haris	21	18
5	(Japan) M Matsutomo (Japan) A Takahashi	22	21
(Chinese Taipei) Chiang K-h (Chinese Taipei) Tsai P-l	20	4
(Malaysia) Goh L Y (Malaysia) Lim Y L	21	21
(Indonesia) M Jauhari (Indonesia) G Polii	19	17
7	(China) Bao YX (China) Tang JH	21	21
(Sweden) E Lennartsson (Sweden) E Wengberg	12	14

Quarterfinals
1	(China) Tian Q (China) Zhao YL	21	21
5	(Japan) M Matsutomo (Japan) A Takahashi	11	18
(Malaysia) Goh L Y (Malaysia) Lim Y L	21	9	13
7	(China) Bao YX (China) Tang JH	18	21	21

Semifinals
1	(China) Tian Q (China) Zhao YL	21	11	21
7	(China) Bao YX (China) Tang JH	18	21	18

=== Bottom half ===
First Round
(India) P Gadre (India) A Ponnappa	21	21
PFQ	(France) A Fontaine (France) E Lefel	10	16
(Thailand) D Aroonkesorn (Thailand) K Voravichitchaikul	21	21
8	(Singapore) S M Sari (Singapore) Yao L	14	16
Q3	(Hong Kong) Mei C Y (Hong Kong) Yuen S Y	24	20	15
(Russia) A Prokopenko (Russia) N Vislova	22	22	21
(Chinese Taipei) Wang P-r (Chinese Taipei) Yu W-k	14	16
4	(Japan) S Matsuo (Japan) M Naito	21	21
PFQ	(Chinese Taipei) Pai H-m (Chinese Taipei) Wu T-j	21	21
Q4	(Hong Kong) Shek H Y (Hong Kong) Yeung Y K	14	9
Q1	(Hong Kong) Tsang W C (Hong Kong) Yung N W	6	9
6	(South Korea) Eom H-w (South Korea) Jang Y-n	21	21
(Malaysia) Hoo V K M (Malaysia) Woon K W	21	21
(South Korea) Choi H-i (South Korea) Kim S-y	19	18
(India) A Balan (India) N. S Reddy	3	7
2	(China) Wang XL (China) Yu Y	21	21

Second Round
(India) P Gadre (India) A Ponnappa	17	18
(Thailand) D Aroonkesorn (Thailand) K Voravichitchaikul	21	21
(Russia) A Prokopenko (Russia) N Vislova	6	14
4	(Japan) S Matsuo (Japan) M Naito	21	21
PFQ	(Chinese Taipei) Pai H-m (Chinese Taipei) Wu T-j	12	9
6	(South Korea) Eom H-w (South Korea) Jang Y-n	21	21
(Malaysia) Hoo V K M (Malaysia) Woon K W	12	17
2	(China) Wang XL (China) Yu Y	21	21

Quarterfinals
(Thailand) D Aroonkesorn (Thailand) K Voravichitchaikul	12	13
4	(Japan) S Matsuo (Japan) M Naito	21	21
6	(South Korea) Eom H-w (South Korea) Jang Y-n	10	19
2	(China) Wang XL (China) Yu Y	21	21

Semifinals
4	(Japan) S Matsuo (Japan) M Naito	15	6
2	(China) Wang XL (China) Yu Y	21	21

=== Finals ===
Semifinals
1	(China) Tian Qing (China) Zhao Yunlei	21	11	21
7	(China) Bao Yixin (China) Tang Jinhua	18	21	18
4	(Japan) Shizuka Matsuo (Japan) Mami Naito	15	6
2	(China) Wang Xiaoli (China) Yu Yang	21	21

Final
1	(China) Tian Qing (China) Zhao Yunlei	22	14	21
2	(China) Wang Xiaoli (China) Yu Yang	20	21	17

== Mixed doubles ==
=== Seeds ===
1. (China) Xu Chen / Ma Jin
2. (China) Zhang Nan / Zhao Yunlei
3. (Malaysia) Chan Peng Soon / Goh Liu Ying
4. (Denmark) Joachim Fischer Nielsen / Christinna Pedersen
5. (Indonesia) Muhammad Rijal / Debby Susanto
6. (Indonesia) Fran Kurniawan / Shendy Puspa Irawati
7. (Singapore) Danny Bawa Chrisnanta / Yu Yan Vanessa Neo
8. (Thailand) Songphon Anugritayawon / Kunchala Voravichitchaikul

=== Top half ===
First Round
1	(China) Xu C (China) Ma J	21	21
(India) K Tarun (India) A Ponnappa	15	16
(United States) P Chew (United States) J Subandi	19	15
(India) P J Chopra (India) N. S Reddy	21	21
7	(Singapore) D B Chrisnanta (Singapore) Y Y V Neo	21	21
(South Korea) Kim S-r (South Korea) Choi H-i	18	15
Q2	(Malaysia) Ong J G (Malaysia) Woon K W	18	21	21
(Thailand) P Chalardchaleam (Thailand) S Amitrapai	21	14	17
3	(Malaysia) Chan P S (Malaysia) Goh L Y	22	19	21
Q3	(China) Tao JM (China) Tang JH	20	21	15
(Russia) S Lunev (Russia) E Dimova	10	21	24
(France) R Labar (France) L Choinet	21	13	22
5	(Indonesia) M Rijal (Indonesia) D Susanto	21	21
(Russia) V Durkin (Russia) N Vislova	14	9
(Hong Kong) Wang W H (Hong Kong) Chan H Y	16	18
(South Korea) Yoo Y-s (South Korea) Jang Y-n	21	21

Second Round
1	(China) Xu C (China) Ma J	16	10
(India) P J Chopra (India) S Reddy N.	21	21
7	(Singapore) D B Chrisnanta (Singapore) Y Y V Neo	21	18	21
Q2	(Malaysia) Ong J G (Malaysia) Woon K W	17	21	18
3	(Malaysia) Chan P S (Malaysia) Goh L Y	21	21
(Russia) S Lunev (Russia) E Dimova	18	18
5	(Indonesia) M Rijal (Indonesia) D Susanto	21	24	18
(South Korea) Yoo Y-s (South Korea) Jang Y-n	17	26	21

Quarterfinals
1	(China) Xu C (China) Ma J	21	21
7	(Singapore) D B Chrisnanta (Singapore) Y Y V Neo	17	13
3	(Malaysia) Chan P S (Malaysia) Goh L Y	23	21	21
(South Korea) Yoo Y-s (South Korea) Jang Y-n	25	16	15

Semifinals
1	(China) Xu C (China) Ma J	21	21
3	(Malaysia) Chan P S (Malaysia) Goh L Y	16	18

=== Bottom half ===
First Round
Q1	(Denmark) M Pieler Kolding (Denmark) K Rytter Juhl	29	24
(South Korea) Shin B-c (South Korea) Eom H-w	27	22
(India) A Dewalker (India) P Gadre	18	21
6	(Indonesia) F Kurniawan (Indonesia) S P Irawati	21	23
(France) G Mittelheiser (France) E Lefel	11	13
(Indonesia) M Kido (Indonesia) P Z Bernadeth	21	21
(Japan) K Hayakawa (Japan) M Matsutomo	15	17
4	(Denmark) J Fischer Nielsen (Denmark) C Pedersen	21	21
(India) A Vishnu (India) A Balan	13	11
(Indonesia) R Widianto (Indonesia) P R Dili	21	21
(Malaysia) Tan W K (Malaysia) Lim Y L	21	16	21
PFQ	(South Korea) Kim K-j (South Korea) Kim S-y	17	21	12
(France) B Careme (France) A Fontaine	18	17
Q4	(China) Qiu ZH (China) Luo Y
(Malaysia) Tan A Q (Malaysia) Lai P J	12	12
2	(China) Zhang N (China) Zhao YL	21	21

Second Round
Q1	(Denmark) M Pieler Kolding (Denmark) K Rytter Juhl	15	10
6	(Indonesia) F Kurniawan (Indonesia) S P Irawati	21	21
(Indonesia) M Kido (Indonesia) P Z Bernadeth	13	9
4	(Denmark) J Fischer Nielsen (Denmark) C Pedersen	21	21
(Indonesia) R Widianto (Indonesia) P R Dili	21	21
(Malaysia) Tan W K (Malaysia) Lim Y L	17	8
Q4	(China) Qiu ZH (China) Luo Y	22	16	15
2	(China) Zhang N (China) Zhao YL	20	21	21

Quarterfinals
6	(Indonesia) F Kurniawan (Indonesia) S P Irawati	21	8
4	(Denmark) J Fischer Nielsen (Denmark) C Pedersen	23	21
(Indonesia) R Widianto (Indonesia) P R Dili	18	12
2	(China) Zhang N (China) Zhao YL	21	21

Semifinals
4	(Denmark) J Fischer Nielsen (Denmark) C Pedersen	21	15	21
2	(China) Zhang N (China) Zhao YL	13	21	23

=== Finals ===
Semifinals
1	(China) Xu Chen (China) Ma Jin	21	21
3	(Malaysia) Chan Peng Soon (Malaysia) Goh Liu Ying	16	18
4	(Denmark) Joachim Fischer Nielsen (Denmark) Christinna Pedersen	21	15	21
2	(China) Zhang Nan (China) Zhao Yunlei	13	21	23

Final
1	(China) Xu Chen (China) Ma Jin	17	17
2	(China) Zhang Nan (China) Zhao Yunlei	21	21

Preceded by 2011 Hong Kong Super Series	Hong Kong Super Series	Succeeded by 2013 Hong Kong Super Series
Preceded by 2012 China Open Super Series Premier	2012 BWF Super Series	Succeeded by 2012 BWF Super Series Masters Finals
