= 2012 India Open Grand Prix Gold =

Tournament details
- Dates: 18 December 2012 - 23 December 2012
- Total prize money: US$120,000
- Venue: Babu Banarasi Das Indoor Stadium
- Location: Lucknow, India

The 2012 Syed Modi International India Grand Prix Gold was the last Grand Prix Gold and Grand Prix tournament of the 2012 BWF Grand Prix Gold and Grand Prix. The tournament was held in Babu Banarasi Das Indoor Stadium, Lucknow, India from 18 December until 23 December 2012 and had a total purse of $120,000.

== Men's singles ==
=== Seeds ===
1. (Indonesia) Taufik Hidayat (first round)
2. (India) Kashyap Parupalli (champion)
3. (Indonesia) Tommy Sugiarto (semi-final)
4. (India) Ajay Jayaram (third round)
5. (Indonesia) Alamsyah Yunus (semi-final)
6. (India) Sourabh Varma (first round)
7. (Malaysia) Mohd Arif Abdul Latif (third round)
8. (Sri Lanka) Niluka Karunaratne (second round)
9. (Malaysia) Muhammad Hafiz Hashim (withdrew)
10. (Thailand) Suppanyu Avihingsanon (second round)
11. (Indonesia) Andre Kurniawan Tedjono (withdrew)
12. (India) R. M. V. Gurusaidutt (quarter-final)
13. (Singapore) Derek Wong (first round)
14. (Thailand) Tanongsak Saensomboonsuk (final)
15. (Malaysia) Zulfadli Zulkiffli (first round)
16. (India) B. Sai Praneeth (third round)

=== Finals ===
Quarterfinals
(India) Prannoy Kumar	21	10	12
5	(Indonesia) Alamsyah Yunus	18	21	21
(India) Srikanth Kidambi	16	12
14	(Thailand) Tanongsak Saensomboonsuk	21	21
12	(India) R. M. V. Gurusaidutt	21	20	16
3	(Indonesia) Tommy Sugiarto	19	22	21
(Malaysia) Goh Soon Huat	21	21	16
2	(India) Kashyap Parupalli	23	8	21

Semifinals
5	(Indonesia) Alamsyah Yunus	14	17
14	(Thailand) Tanongsak Saensomboonsuk	21	21
3	(Indonesia) Tommy Sugiarto	18	21
2	(India) Kashyap Parupalli	21	23

Final
14	(Thailand) Tanongsak Saensomboonsuk	19	21	17
2	(India) Kashyap Parupalli	21	14	21

=== Top half ===
==== Section 1 ====
First Round
1	(Indonesia) T Hidayat	17	12
(India) P Joshi	21	21
(Indonesia) Siswanto	21	17	21
(Australia) L Chong	7	21	9
PFQ	(Indonesia) A A Prasojo	21	21
Q7	(India) N. V. S. Vijetha	11	15
Q8	(India) V Harsha	9	6
(India) P Kumar	21	21

Second Round
(India) P Joshi	18	21	20
(Indonesia) Siswanto	21	16	22
PFQ	(Indonesia) A A Prasojo	12	10
(India) P Kumar	21	21

Third Round
(Indonesia) Siswanto	18	12
(India) P Kumar	21	21

==== Section 2 ====
First Round
5	(Indonesia) A Yunus	21	21
(India) A Sridhar	12	12
(Malaysia) Loh WS	21	21
Q3	(India) N Vashist	7	6
13	(Singapore) D Wong	20	14
(South Korea) Yim J-w	22	21
Q2	(India) A Joshi	18	10
(India) C Anand	21	21

Second Round
5	(Indonesia) A Yunus	21	21
(Malaysia) Loh WS	18	8
(South Korea) Yim J-w	15	21	21
(India) C Anand	21	15	18

Third Round
5	(Indonesia) A Yunus	21	21
(South Korea) Yim J-w	17	13

==== Section 3 ====
First Round
4	(India) A Jayaram	21	21
(Russia) N Khakimov	15	13
(Indonesia) E Sukamta	21	21
(India) A Singh	13	15
PFR	(India) M Behal	21	9	18
(India) V Reddy	16	21	21
(India) S Kidambi	21	15	21
(Malaysia) N M A Ayub	11	21	19

Second Round
4	(India) A Jayaram	21	21
(Indonesia) E Sukamta	9	15
(India) V Reddy	12	12
(India) S Kidambi	21	21

Third Round
4	(India) A Jayaram	18	18
(India) S Kidambi	21	21

==== Section 4 ====
First Round
8	(Sri Lanka) N Karunaratne	21	16	21
PFQ	(South Korea) Kim M-k	17	21	14
(South Korea) Park S-m	21	21
(Malaysia) Soo TZ	16	13
14	(Thailand) T Saensomboonsuk	21	21
Q4	(India) A Naqvi	13	9
(India) S Verma	21	16	24
(Russia) A Yartsev	12	21	22

Second Round
8	(Sri Lanka) N Karunaratne	20	21	14
(South Korea) Park S-m	22	15	21
14	(Thailand) T Saensomboonsuk	21	21
(India) S Verma	19	16

Third Round
(South Korea) Park S-m	11	21	15
14	(Thailand) T Saensomboonsuk	21	19	21

=== Bottom half ===
==== Section 5 ====
First Round
(Malaysia) I Z Zainuddin	16	21	21
(India) M Kamat	21	15	15
Q1	(India) P Jolly	11	19
12	(India) R M V Gurusaidutt	21	21
(Indonesia) A Marteen	21	21
(Australia) N Tang	7	11
(Singapore) R Gonansa	14	10
7	(Malaysia) M A Abdul Latif	21	21

Second Round
(Malaysia) I Z Zainuddin	8	21
12	(India) R M V Gurusaidutt	21	21
(Indonesia) A Marteen	17	17
7	(Malaysia) M A Abdul Latif	21	21

Third Round
12	(India) R M V Gurusaidutt	21	21
7	(Malaysia) M A Abdul Latif	10	16

==== Section 6 ====
First Round
(Sri Lanka) D Karunaratne	wo
PFQ	(India) S Lakhanee
(Singapore) Huang C	15	15
16	(India) B S Praneeth	21	21
(Malaysia) Z Zulkiffli	21	21
(India) D Khatri	18	18
Q5	(India) A Manota	11	7
3	(Indonesia) T Sugiarto	21	21

Second Round
PFQ	(India) S Lakhanee	21	3	5
16	(India) B S Praneeth	19	21	21
(Malaysia) Z Zulkiffli	10	6
3	(Indonesia) T Sugiarto	21	21

Third Round
16	(India) B S Praneeth	21	12	16
3	(Indonesia) T Sugiarto	12	21	21

==== Section 7 ====
First Round
(Malaysia) M R Misbun	17	21	21
(India) O Bansal	21	15	18
(Indonesia) S A Setia Putra	19	18
10	(Thailand) S Avihingsanon	21	21
Q6	(India) S Nandaluri	9	18
(India) R Yadav	21	21
(Malaysia) Goh SH	21	21
6	(India) S Varma	19	14

Second Round
(Malaysia) M R Misbun	17	21	21
10	(Thailand) S Avihingsanon	21	19	5
(India) R Yadav	16	19
(Malaysia) Goh SH	21	21

Third Round
(Malaysia) M R Misbun	16	21	16
(Malaysia) Goh SH	21	13	21

==== Section 8 ====
First Round
(India) S Dey	21	12	21
(Malaysia) Goh GC	16	21	16
(Thailand) P Thongnuam	16	21	16
15	(Malaysia) Z Zulkiffli	21	18	11^{r}
(Russia) V Malkov	21	21
(India) A Prakash	14	12
(South Korea) Ha Y-w	18	9
2	(India) K Parupalli	21	21

Second Round
(India) S Dey	14	14
(Thailand) P Thongnuam	21	21
(Russia) V Malkov	22	21	18
2	(India) K Parupalli	24	16	21

Third Round
(Thailand) P Thongnuam	16	17
2	(India) K Parupalli	21	21

== Women's singles ==
=== Seeds ===
1. (India) Saina Nehwal (first round)
2. (India) P. V. Sindhu (final)
3. (Thailand) Sapsiree Taerattanachai (semi-final)
4. (Thailand) Nichaon Jindapon (quarter-final)
5. (Indonesia) Aprilia Yuswandari (quarter-final)
6. (Japan) Nozomi Okuhara (semi-final)
7. (Indonesia) Lindaweni Fanetri (champion)
8. (Indonesia) Hera Desi (second round)

=== Finals ===
Semifinals
6	(Japan) Nozomi Okuhara	20	16
7	(Indonesia) Lindaweni Fanetri	21	21
3	(Thailand) Sapsiree Taerattanachai	12	14
2	(India) P. V. Sindhu	21	21

Final
7	(Indonesia) Lindaweni Fanetri	21	18	21
2	(India) P. V. Sindhu	15	21	18

=== Top half ===
==== Section 1 ====
First Round
1	(India) S Nehwal	21	20^{r}
(Russia) K Polikarpova	17	18
(Malaysia) S Saniru	21	20	21
(Russia) R Gabdullina	15	22	15
6	(Japan) N Okuhara	21	21
PFQ	(India) M Sahdev	5	8
(India) T Lad	10	15
(Indonesia) M F Kusumastuti	21	21

Second Round
(Russia) K Polikarpova	10	12
(Malaysia) S Saniru	21	21
6	(Japan) N Okuhara	21	21
(Indonesia) M F Kusumastuti	9	19

Quarterfinals
(Malaysia) S Saniru	17	12
6	(Japan) N Okuhara	21	21

==== Section 2 ====
First Round
4	(Thailand) N Jindapon	21	21
(India) M Dhainje	12	6
Q3	(India) R Shivani	21	11	21
(India) P C Thulasi	14	21	13
7	(Indonesia) L Fanetri	24	21
Q4	(India) T Murgunde	22	9
Q1	(India) R Das	16
(India) A Mutatkar	14^{r}

Second Round
4	(Thailand) N Jindapon	21	21
Q3	(India) R Shivani	4	13
7	(Indonesia) L Fanetri	19	21	28
Q1	(India) R Das	21	17	26

Quarterfinals
4	(Thailand) N Jindapon	15	21	12
7	(Indonesia) L Fanetri	21	10	21

=== Bottom half ===
==== Section 3 ====
First Round
(Indonesia) M Wiranto	21	20	18
(India) S Gokhale	19	22	21
(Russia) N Perminova	17	17
5	(Indonesia) A Yuswandari	21	21
(Malaysia) S Cheah	21	21
Q2	(Thailand) P Chochuwong	11	11
(India) A Pantawane	19	18
3	(Thailand) S Taerattanachai	21	21

Second Round
(India) S Gokhale	15	11
5	(Indonesia) A Yuswandari	21	21
(Malaysia) S Cheah	21	5	11
3	(Thailand) S Taerattanachai	13	21	21

Quarterfinals
5	(Indonesia) A Yuswandari	16	11
3	(Thailand) S Taerattanachai	21	21

==== Section 4 ====
First Round
(India) N Pandit	14	20
(Indonesia) F Angguni	21	22
(Austria) S Prutsch	9	10
8	(Indonesia) H Desi	21	21
(Australia) V Na	21	12	21
(India) S Jasti	11	21	19
(Malaysia) Yang LL	6	12
2	(India) P V Sindhu	21	21

Second Round
(Indonesia) F Angguni	15	21	21
8	(Indonesia) H Desi	21	19	10
(Australia) V Na	9	9
2	(India) P V Sindhu	21	21

Quarterfinals
(Indonesia) F Angguni	13	17
2	(India) P V Sindhu	21	21

== Men's doubles ==
=== Seeds ===
1. (Indonesia) Yonathan Suryatama Dasuki/Hendra Aprida Gunawan (semi-final)
2. (Indonesia) Ricky Karanda Suwardi/Muhammad Ulinnuha (quarter-final)
3. (Thailand) Patiphat Chalardchaleam/Nipitphon Phuangphuapet (first round)
4. (South Korea) Ko Sung-hyun/Lee Yong-dae (champion)
5. (Indonesia) Marcus Fernaldi Gideon/Agripina Prima Rahmanto Putra (semi-final)
6. (Indonesia) Andrei Adistia/Christopher Rusdianto (quarter-final)
7. (India) Tarun Kona/Arun Vishnu (first round)
8. (India) Pranav Chopra/Akshay Dewalkar (second round)

=== Finals ===
Semifinals
1	(Indonesia) Yonathan Suryatama Dasuki (Indonesia) Hendra Aprida Gunawan	12	12
(South Korea) Kang Ji-wook (South Korea) Lee Sang-joon	21	21
4	(South Korea) Ko Sung-hyun (South Korea) Lee Yong-dae	21	21
5	(Indonesia) Marcus Fernaldi Gideon (Indonesia) Agripina Prima Rahmanto Putra	10	8

Final
(South Korea) Kang Ji-wook (South Korea) Lee Sang-joon	13	19
4	(South Korea) Ko Sung-hyun (South Korea) Lee Yong-dae	21	21

=== Top half ===
==== Section 1 ====
First Round
1	(Indonesia) Y S Dasuki (Indonesia) H A Gunawan	21	21
(India) M Behal (India) T Gill	9	16
(India) D Khatri (India) V Reddy	21	21
Q4	(India) S Rathee (India) N Vashist	14	17
7	(India) T Kona (India) A Vishnu	14	16
(Indonesia) B Angriawan (Indonesia) Y R Sugiarto	21	21
(India) N Kidambi (India) H Babu	23	21
Q3	(India) M Mohan (India) P. H. Suraj	21	10

Second Round
1	(Indonesia) Y S Dasuki (Indonesia) H A Gunawan	21	21
(India) D Khatri (India) V Reddy	15	15
(Indonesia) B Angriawan (Indonesia) Y R Sugiarto	21	21
(India) N Kidambi (India) H Babu	14	16

Quarterfinals
1	(Indonesia) Y S Dasuki (Indonesia) H A Gunawan	22	15	21
(Indonesia) B Angriawan (Indonesia) Y R Sugiarto	20	21	10

==== Section 2 ====
First Round
3	(Thailand) P Chalardchaleam (Thailand) N Phuangphuapet	17	15
(South Korea) Cho G-w (South Korea) Kim D-e	21	21
(India) M Gupta (India) G Venkat	15	12
(South Korea) Kang J-w (South Korea) Lee S-j	21	21
6	(Indonesia) A Adistia (Indonesia) C Rusdianto	21	21
Q2	(Thailand) W Ampunsuwan (Thailand) W Uttamang	16	14
(Malaysia) Chooi KM (Malaysia) Ow YH	20	21	21
(France) B Careme (France) G Mittelheisser	22	18	16

Second Round
(South Korea) Cho G-w (South Korea) Kim D-e	18	18
(South Korea) Kang J-w (South Korea) Lee S-j	21	21
6	(Indonesia) A Adistia (Indonesia) C Rusdianto	16	21	21
(Malaysia) Chooi KM (Malaysia) Ow YH	21	19	16

Quarterfinals
(South Korea) Kang J-w (South Korea) Lee S-j	21	22
6	(Indonesia) A Adistia (Indonesia) C Rusdianto	18	20

=== Bottom half ===
==== Section 3 ====
First Round
(Malaysia) M L Z Abdul Khalid (Malaysia) Teo KS	19	21
(Indonesia) W Nayaka (Indonesia) A Yusuf	21	23
PFQ	(Indonesia) R Adianto (Indonesia) Hardianto	19	19
8	(India) P Chopra (India) A Dewalkar	21	21
(India) S. Sanjeeth (India) J Yadav	14	12
PFQ	(India) J James (India) K. Dilshad	21	21
(Indonesia) R Alexander (Indonesia) S Geh	16	12
4	(South Korea) Ko S-h (South Korea) Lee Y-d	21	21

Second Round
(Indonesia) W Nayaka (Indonesia) A Yusuf	22	21
8	(India) P Chopra (India) A Dewalkar	20	17
PFQ	(India) J James (India) K. Dilshad	6	7
4	(South Korea) Ko S-h (South Korea) Lee Y-d	21	21

Quarterfinals
(Indonesia) W Nayaka (Indonesia) A Yusuf	12	23	8
4	(South Korea) Ko S-h (South Korea) Lee Y-d	21	21	21

==== Section 4 ====
First Round
(India) M Attri (India) S Reddy	21	12	21
(France) R Labar (France) M Quere	15	21	15
(Singapore) T Yeo (Singapore) Liu Y	12	17
5	(Indonesia) M F Gideon (Indonesia) A P R Putra	21	21
(India) A Francis (India) V Diju	21	21
PFQ	(India) G Raju (India) S Sharma	11	18
Q1	(India) B. Venkatesh (India) S Ravuri	11	9
2	(Indonesia) R K Suwardi (Indonesia) M Ulinnuha	21	21

Second Round
(India) M Attri (India) S Reddy	19	11
5	(Indonesia) M F Gideon (Indonesia) A P R Putra	21	21
(India) A Francis (India) V Diju	8	11
2	(Indonesia) R K Suwardi (Indonesia) M Ulinnuha	21	21

Quarterfinals
5	(Indonesia) M F Gideon (Indonesia) A P R Putra	21	18	21
2	(Indonesia) R K Suwardi (Indonesia) M Ulinnuha	14	21	12

== Women's doubles ==
=== Seeds ===
1. (Singapore) Shinta Mulia Sari/Yao Lei (semi-final)
2. (Thailand) Savitree Amitrapai/Sapsiree Taerattanachai (champion)
3. (Indonesia) Komala Dewi/Jenna Gozali (final)
4. (South Korea) Lee So-hee/Shin Seung-chan (semi-final)

=== Finals ===
Semifinals
1	(Singapore) Shinta Mulia Sari (Singapore) Yao Lei	21	10	10
3	(Indonesia) Komala Dewi (Indonesia) Jenna Gozali	18	21	21
4	(South Korea) Lee So-hee (South Korea) Shin Seung-chan	21	18	19
2	(Thailand) Savitree Amitrapai (Thailand) Sapsiree Taerattanachai	12	21	21

Final
3	(Indonesia) Komala Dewi (Indonesia) Jenna Gozali	12	6
2	(Thailand) Savitree Amitrapai (Thailand) Sapsiree Taerattanachai	21	21

=== Top half ===
==== Section 1 ====
First Round
(Malaysia) Chow MK (Malaysia) Lee MY	13	21	20
(South Korea) Chae Y-j (South Korea) Kim J-w	21	19	22

Second Round
1	(Singapore) S Sari (Singapore) Yao L	21	21
(India) Y Sharma (India) S Srivastava	7	6
(India) P Gadre (India) A Ponnappa	wo
(South Korea) Chae Y-j (South Korea) Kim J-w

Quarterfinals
1	(Singapore) S Sari (Singapore) Yao L	21	21
(South Korea) Chae Y-j (South Korea) Kim J-w	18	17

==== Section 2 ====
First Round
(India) T Murgunde (India) P Sawant	11	21	7
(Indonesia) R Amelia (Indonesia) M Oklamona	21	19	21
(Thailand) P Arkornsakul (Thailand) J Kittiharakul	22	21	21
(India) S Ghorpade (India) K. Maneesha	24	15	12

Second Round
3	(Indonesia) K Dewi (Indonesia) J Gozali	21	21
(Indonesia) R Amelia (Indonesia) M Oklamona	19	13
(South Korea) Ko A-r (South Korea) Yoo H-w	21	17	21
(Thailand) P Arkornsakul (Thailand) J Kittiharakul	6	21	13

Quarterfinals
3	(Indonesia) K Dewi (Indonesia) J Gozali	22	21
(South Korea) Ko A-r (South Korea) Yoo H-w	20	14

=== Bottom half ===
==== Section 3 ====
First Round
(Thailand) R Chuthabunditkul (Thailand) C Julrattanamanee	21	21
(India) K Das (India) K Phukon	3	10
(India) V Belawadi (India) M Sahdev	15	7
(Indonesia) S D Aulia (Indonesia) A S Awanda	21	21

Second Round
(Thailand) R Chuthabunditkul (Thailand) C Julrattanamanee	16	16
(Indonesia) D P Medita (Indonesia) K Rosmini	21	21
(Indonesia) S D Aulia (Indonesia) A S Awanda	11	16
4	(South Korea) Lee S-h (South Korea) Shin S-c	21	21

Quarterfinals
(Indonesia) D P Medita (Indonesia) K Rosmini	15	12
4	(South Korea) Lee S-h (South Korea) Shin S-c	21	21

==== Section 4 ====
First Round
(India) J Nashier (India) J Nashier	3	9
(Singapore) V Neo (Singapore) D Yuliana	21	21
(India) A Balan (India) N. Sikki Reddy	21	21
(France) A Fontaine (France) E Lefel	15	13

Second Round
(Singapore) V Neo (Singapore) D Yuliana	21	15	22
(Russia) I Khlebko (Russia) K Polikarpova	19	21	20
(India) A Balan (India) N. Sikki Reddy	11	15
2	(Thailand) S Amitrapai (Thailand) S Taerattanachai	21	21

Quarterfinals
(Singapore) V Neo (Singapore) D Yuliana	11	16
2	(Thailand) S Amitrapai (Thailand) S Taerattanachai	21	21

== Mixed doubles ==
=== Seeds ===
1. (Indonesia) Muhammad Rijal/Debby Susanto (withdrew)
2. (Indonesia) Fran Kurniawan/Shendy Puspa Irawati (champion)
3. (Singapore) Danny Bawa Chrisnanta/Vanessa Neo (semi-final)
4. (Indonesia) Riky Widianto/Richi Puspita Dili (withdrew)

=== Finals ===
Semifinals
(Thailand) Nipitphon Puangpuapech (Thailand) Savitree Amitrapai	21	21
3	(Singapore) Danny Bawa Chrisnanta (Singapore) Vanessa Neo	18	18
(South Korea) Kang Ji-wook (South Korea) Shin Seung-chan	14	17
2	(Indonesia) Fran Kurniawan (Indonesia) Shendy Puspa Irawati	21	21

Final
(Thailand) Nipitphon Puangpuapech (Thailand) Savitree Amitrapai	12	22
2	(Indonesia) Fran Kurniawan (Indonesia) Shendy Puspa Irawati	21	24

=== Top half ===
==== Section 1 ====
First Round
1	(Indonesia) M Rijal (Indonesia) D Susanto
BYE
(France) B Careme (France) A Fontaine	21	21
(India) G Raju (India) P Ram	12	11
(Australia) L Chong (Australia) V Na
(India) A Dewalkar (India) P Gadre	wo
(Thailand) N Puangpuapech (Thailand) S Amitrapai	1
(India) A Vishnu (India) A Balan	0^{r}

Second Round
1	(Indonesia) M Rijal (Indonesia) D Susanto	wo
(France) B Careme (France) A Fontaine
(Australia) L Chong (Australia) V Na	7	8
(Thailand) N Puangpuapech (Thailand) S Amitrapai	21	21

Quarterfinals
(France) B Careme (France) A Fontaine	wo
(Thailand) N Puangpuapech (Thailand) S Amitrapai

==== Section 2 ====
First Round
3	(Singapore) D Chrisnanta (Singapore) V Neo	21	21
(Thailand) W Uttamang (Thailand) C Julrattanamanee	13	5
(India) P S Chouhan (India) N Saini	7	4
(South Korea) Lee S-j (South Korea) Chae Y-j	21	21
(Indonesia) I Fadhilah (Indonesia) W Anggraini	21	21
(India) H Malik (India) K Antil	5	12
(Malaysia) Tan AQ (Malaysia) Lai PJ	22	21
(Russia) A Yartsev (Russia) I Khlebko	20	19

Second Round
3	(Singapore) D Chrisnanta (Singapore) V Neo	21	21
(South Korea) Lee S-j (South Korea) Chae Y-j	15	17
(Indonesia) I Fadhilah (Indonesia) W Anggraini	18	20
(Malaysia) Tan AQ (Malaysia) Lai PJ	21	22

Quarterfinals
3	(Singapore) D Chrisnanta (Singapore) V Neo	21	21
(Malaysia) Tan AQ (Malaysia) Lai PJ	15	8

=== Bottom half ===
==== Section 3 ====
First Round
(India) M Attri (India) K. Maneesha	8	20
(Singapore) T Yeo (Singapore) D Yuliana	21	22
(France) G Mittelheisser (France) E Lefel	21	21
(Thailand) W Ampunsuwan (Thailand) R Chuthabunditkul	17	12
(South Korea) Kang J-w (South Korea) Shin S-c	21	21
(India) T Kona (India) A Ponnappa	16	18
(South Korea) Kim D-e (South Korea) Ko A-r
4	(Indonesia) R Widianto (Indonesia) R Dili	wo

Second Round
(Singapore) T Yeo (Singapore) D Yuliana	18	18
(France) G Mittelheisser (France) E Lefel	21	21
(South Korea) Kang J-w (South Korea) Shin S-c	21	21
(South Korea) Kim D-e (South Korea) Ko A-r	8	16

Quarterfinals
(France) G Mittelheisser (France) E Lefel	17	10
(South Korea) Kang J-w (South Korea) Shin S-c	21	21

==== Section 4 ====
First Round
(Singapore) Liu Y (Singapore) Thng TT	21	21
(India) A Manota (India) R Sachdev	5	18
(Thailand) P Chalardchaleam (Thailand) J Kittiharakul	21	21
(India) N D'Sa (India) P Sawant	12	12
(India) P Chopra (India) N. Sikki Reddy	26	21
(France) R Labar (France) L Choinet	24	7
BYE
2	(Indonesia) F Kurniawan (Indonesia) S P Irawati

Second Round
(Singapore) Liu Y (Singapore) Thng TT	19	11
(Thailand) P Chalardchaleam (Thailand) J Kittiharakul	21	21
(India) P Chopra (India) N. Sikki Reddy	9	14
2	(Indonesia) F Kurniawan (Indonesia) S P Irawati	21	21

Quarterfinals
(Thailand) P Chalardchaleam (Thailand) J Kittiharakul	15	16
2	(Indonesia) F Kurniawan (Indonesia) S P Irawati	21	21

Preceded by 2012 Korea Open Grand Prix Gold	BWF Grand Prix Gold and Grand Prix; 2012 season	Succeeded by 2013 German Open Grand Prix Gold
