= Andrei Adistia =

Indonesian badminton player (born 1990)

Personal information
- Born: 15 December 1990 (age 35) Jakarta, Indonesia
- Height: 1.75 m (5 ft 9 in)

Sport
- Country: Indonesia
- Sport: Badminton
- Handedness: Right

Men's & mixed doubles
- Highest ranking: 16 (17 July 2015)
- Current ranking: 1363 (XD with Maria Febe Kusumastuti 17 March 2020)
- BWF profile

Andrei Adistia (born 15 December 1990) is an Indonesian badminton player who specializes in doubles. With his partner Hendra Aprida Gunawan, they have won some international tournaments such as 2014 Vietnam Open Grand Prix and 2014 Chinese Taipei Open Grand Prix Gold.

== Personal life ==
Adistia married a former national badminton player from PB Djarum, Maria Febe Kusumastuti on 27 October 2017.

== Achievements ==
=== BWF Grand Prix (2 titles, 2 runners-up) ===
The BWF Grand Prix had two levels, the BWF Grand Prix and Grand Prix Gold. It was a series of badminton tournaments sanctioned by the Badminton World Federation (BWF) which was held from 2007 to 2017.

Men's doubles
Year	Tournament	Partner	Opponent	Score	Result	Ref.
2011	India Grand Prix Gold	(Indonesia) Christopher Rusdianto	(Japan) Naoki Kawamae (Japan) Shoji Sato	17–21, 21–12, 21–23	(silver) Runner-up	
2014	Chinese Taipei Open	(Indonesia) Hendra Aprida Gunawan	(China) Li Junhui (China) Liu Yuchen	21–14, 16–21, 21–16	(gold) Winner	
2014	Vietnam Open	(Indonesia) Hendra Aprida Gunawan	(Japan) Kenta Kazuno (Japan) Kazushi Yamada	15–21, 23–21, 21–17	(gold) Winner	

Mixed doubles
Year	Tournament	Partner	Opponent	Score	Result	Ref.
2015	Canada Open	(Indonesia) Vita Marissa	(Hong Kong) Lee Chun Hei (Hong Kong) Chau Hoi Wah	16–21, 18–21	(silver) Runner-up	

BWF Grand Prix Gold tournament
BWF Grand Prix tournament

=== BWF International Challenge/Series (1 title, 2 runners-up) ===
Men's doubles
Year	Tournament	Partner	Opponent	Score	Result	Ref.
2010	Indonesia International	(Indonesia) Rahmat Adianto	(Indonesia) Berry Angriawan (Indonesia) Muhammad Ulinnuha	14–21, 15–21	(silver) Runner-up	
2010	Malaysia International	(Indonesia) Rahmat Adianto	(Malaysia) Goh Wei Shem (Malaysia) Lim Khim Wah	15–21, 16–21	(silver) Runner-up	
2011	Bahrain International	(Indonesia) Christopher Rusdianto	(India) K. T. Rupesh Kumar (India) Sanave Thomas	14–21, 21–17, 21–13	(gold) Winner	

BWF International Challenge tournament
BWF International Series tournament

== Performance timeline ==
=== Individual competitions ===
- Senior level

Event	2015
World Championships	R2 (MD)

Tournament	2012	2013	2014	2015	Best
BWF Superseries
All England	A			R2 (MD)	R2 (2015)
Malaysia Open	A			R2 (MD); R1 (XD)	R2 (2015)
Singapore Open	A	R1 (MD)	A	R1 (MD); R1 (XD)	R1 (2013, 2015)
Indonesia Open	R2 (MD)	R2 (MD)	R1 (MD)	R2 (MD); R2 (XD)	R2 (2012, 2013, 2015)
Japan Open	A			R1 (MD); R1 (XD)	R1 (2015)
Korea Open	A			R1 (MD); R1 (XD)	R1 (2015)
Denmark Open	A		R1 (MD)	A	R1 (2014)
French Open	A		SF (MD)	A	SF (2014)
Tournament	2012	2013	2014	2015	Best

Tournament	2010	2011	2012	2013	2014	2015	2016	2017	Best
BWF Grand Prix and Grand Prix Gold
Malaysia Masters	A		R1 (MD)	QF (MD)	SF (MD)	R1 (MD)	A	R1 (MD)	SF (2014)
Syed Modi International	A	F (MD)	QF (MD)	—N/a	QF (MD)	A			F (2011)
Thailand Masters	—N/a						R2 (MD)	A	R2 (2016)
Swiss Open	SS	A				R2 (MD)	A		R2 (2015)
Australian Open	A			R1 (MD)	SS				R1 (2013)
New Zealand Open	—N/a	IC	—N/a	R2 (MD)	A	R1 (MD); QF (XD)	A		QF (2015)
Canada Open	A					SF (MD); F (XD)	SF (MD); QF (XD)	A	F (2015)
China Masters	SS				R2 (MD)	A			R2 (2014)
Chinese Taipei Open	A				W (MD)	R1 (MD); R2 (XD)	A	R1 (MD)	W (2014)
Vietnam Open	A		R2 (MD)	A	W (MD); R2 (XD)	SF (MD); QF (XD)	A	R1 (MD)	W (2014)
Thailand Open	—N/a	A	R1 (MD)	A	—N/a	R1 (MD); R1 (XD)	A		R1 (2012, 2015)
Macau Open	A		R1 (MD)	A					R1 (2012)
Korea Masters	A		R1 (MD)	A					R1 (2012)
Indonesian Masters	R2 (MD)	A	QF (MD)	R2 (MD)	R1 (MD)	A		—N/a	QF (2012)
Bitburger Open	A				R2 (MD)	A			R2 (2014)
Year-end Ranking	105 (MD)	62 (MD)	45 (MD)	84 (MD)	24 (MD); 338 (XD)	35 (MD); 42 (XD)	252 (MD); 287 (XD)	147 (MD)	14 (MD); 36 (XD)
Tournament	2010	2011	2012	2013	2014	2015	2016	2017	Best
