= Jagdish Singh (badminton) =

Malaysian badminton player (born 1993)

Jagdish Singh Dhanoa
Personal information
- Born: Jagdish Singh Dhanoa Kuldip Singh; 29 April 1993 (age 33) Port Dickson, Negeri Sembilan, Malaysia
- Height: 1.78 m (5 ft 10 in)
- Weight: 75 kg (165 lb)

Sport
- Country: Malaysia
- Sport: Badminton

Men's & mixed doubles
- Highest ranking: 37 (MD) 30 Oct 2014; 272 (XD) 15 Sep 2016
- BWF profile
Medal record
Men's Badminton
Representing Malaysia
Summer Universiade
Bronze medal – third place	2017 Taipei	Men's doubles
Bronze medal – third place	2017 Taipei	Mixed team
Bronze medal – third place	2015 Gwangju	Mixed team
Bronze medal – third place	2013 Kazan	Men's doubles
Asia Junior Championships
Silver medal – second place	2011 Lucknow	Mixed team

Jagdish Singh Dhanoa Kuldip Singh (Punjabi: ਜਗਦੀਸ਼ ਸਿੰਘ ਧਨੋਆ, romanized: Jagadīśa sigha dhanō'ā; born 29 April 1993) is a Malaysian male badminton player. In 2013, he won the men's doubles bronze medal at the Summer Universiade in Kazan, Russia.

== Achievements ==
=== Summer Universiade ===
Men's doubles
Year	Venue	Partner	Opponent	Score	Result
2017	Taipei Gymnasium; Taipei, Taiwan	(Malaysia) Vincent Cheng Wei Puah	(South Korea) Kim Jae-hwan (South Korea) Seo Seung-jae	12–21, 12–21	Bronze
2013	Tennis Academy; Kazan, Russia	(Malaysia) Loh Wei Sheng	(South Korea) Ko Sung-hyun (South Korea) Lee Yong-dae	14–21, 8–21	Bronze

=== BWF International Challenge/Series ===
Men's doubles
Year	Tournament	Partner	Opponent	Score	Result
2017	Smiling Fish International	(Malaysia) Nur Mohd Azriyn Ayub	(China) Kang Jun (China) Zhang Sijie	15-21, 15-21	(silver) Runner-up
2016	Smiling Fish International	(Malaysia) Nur Mohd Azriyn Ayub	(Singapore) Danny Bawa Chrisnanta (Singapore) Hendra Wijaya	21-14, 14-21, 14-21	(silver) Runner-up
2015	Sydney International	(Malaysia) Roni Tan Wee Long	(Chinese Taipei) Liu Wei-chen (Chinese Taipei) Yang Po-Han	13–21, 21–17, 21–11	(gold) Winner
2014	Vietnam International Series	(Malaysia) Roni Tan Wee Long	(Malaysia) Low Juan Shen (Malaysia) Ong Yew Sin	19-21, 13-21	(silver) Runner-up
2014	Singapore International Series	(Malaysia) Roni Tan Wee Long	(Chinese Taipei) Huang Po-jui (Chinese Taipei) Lu Ching-yao	14-21, 21-15, 16-21	(silver) Runner-up
2014	Maribyrnong International	(Malaysia) Roni Tan Wee Long	(Australia) Raymond Tam (Australia) Glenn Warfe	21-14, 21-19	(gold) Winner
2013	Singapore International Series	(Malaysia) Roni Tan Wee Long	(Chinese Taipei) Chen Chung-jen (Chinese Taipei) Wang Chi-lin	12-21, 27-25, 16-21	(silver) Runner-up

BWF International Challenge tournament
BWF International Series tournament
BWF Future Series tournament
