= Lim Yin Loo =

Malaysian badminton player (born 1988)

Lim Yin Loo 林芸如
Personal information
- Born: 24 September 1988 (age 38) Seremban, Negeri Sembilan, Malaysia
- Height: 1.64 m (5 ft 5 in)

Sport
- Country: Malaysia
- Sport: Badminton
- Handedness: Right

Women's & mixed doubles
- Highest ranking: 21 (WD), 20 (XD)
- BWF profile
Medal record
Women's badminton
Representing Malaysia
Commonwealth Games
Gold medal – first place	2014 Glasgow	Mixed team
Southeast Asian Games
Bronze medal – third place	2011 Jakarta	Women's team

Lim Yin Loo (born 24 September 1988) is a Malaysian professional badminton player. She was part of the national team that won the gold medal at the 2014 Commonwealth Games in Glasgow, Scotland. Lim won her first BWF Grand Prix title at the 2016 Scottish Open in the women's doubles event partnered with Yap Cheng Wen.

== Achievements ==
=== BWF Grand Prix (1 title) ===
The BWF Grand Prix has two levels, the Grand Prix and Grand Prix Gold. It is a series of badminton tournaments sanctioned by the Badminton World Federation (BWF) since 2007.

Women's doubles
Year	Tournament	Partner	Opponent	Score	Result
2016	Scottish Open	(Malaysia) Yap Cheng Wen	(Malaysia) Amelia Alicia Anscelly (Malaysia) Teoh Mei Xing	21–17, 21–13	(gold) Winner

BWF Grand Prix Gold tournament
BWF Grand Prix tournament

=== BWF International Challenge/Series/Satellite (3 titles, 4 runners-up) ===
Women's doubles
Year	Tournament	Partner	Opponent	Score	Result
2006	Sri Lanka Satellite	(Malaysia) Haw Chiou Hwee	(India) Jwala Gutta (India) Shruti Kurien	15–21, 21–14, 20–22	(silver) Runner-up
2008	Iran Fajr International	(Malaysia) Norshahliza Baharum	(Sri Lanka) Renu Chandrika Hettiarachchige (Sri Lanka) Thilini Jayasinghe	21–12, 21–15	(gold) Winner
2011	Malaysia International	(Malaysia) Marylen Ng	(Japan) Naoko Fukuman (Japan) Kurumi Yonao	16–21, 13–21	(silver) Runner-up
2015	Bangladesh International	(Malaysia) Lee Meng Yean	(Thailand) Chaladchalam Chayanit (Thailand) Phataimas Muenwong	15–21, 19–21	(silver) Runner-up
2016	Vietnam International Series	(Malaysia) Yap Cheng Wen	(Vietnam) Nguyễn Thị Sen (Vietnam) Vũ Thị Trang	18–21, 22–24	(silver) Runner-up
2016	USM Indonesia International	(Malaysia) Yap Cheng Wen	(Indonesia) Nisak Puji Lestari (Indonesia) Merisa Cindy Sahputri	14–21, 15–10 Retired	(gold) Winner

Mixed doubles
Year	Tournament	Partner	Opponent	Score	Result
2008	Malaysia International	(Malaysia) Mohd Lutfi Zaim Abdul Khalid	(Singapore) Danny Bawa Chrisnanta (Singapore) Yu Yan Vanessa Neo	14–21, 21–17, 21–19	(gold) Winner

BWF International Challenge tournament
BWF International Series tournament
BWF Future Series tournament
