= Lee Sang-joon =

South Korean badminton player

Personal information
- Born: 13 November 1992 (age 33)

Sport
- Country: South Korea
- Sport: Badminton

Men's & mixed doubles
- Highest ranking: 31 (MD 12 September 2013); 53 (XD 18 July 2013)
- BWF profile

- Lee Sang-joon
- Hangul: 이상준
- RR: I Sangjun
- MR: I Sangjun

Lee Sang-joon (Korean: 이상준; born 13 November 1992) is a South Korean badminton player who joined the South Korea national badminton team in 2011. In the national events, he played for the MG Saemaul Geumgo team. He was the runner-up at the 2012 India Open Grand Prix Gold in the men's doubles event.

== Achievements ==
=== BWF Grand Prix ===
The BWF Grand Prix had two levels, the BWF Grand Prix and Grand Prix Gold. It was a series of badminton tournaments sanctioned by the Badminton World Federation (BWF) which was held from 2007 to 2017.

Men's doubles

Year	Tournament	Partner	Opponent	Score	Result
2012	India Grand Prix Gold	(South Korea) Kang Ji-wook	(South Korea) Ko Sung-hyun (South Korea) Lee Yong-dae	13–21, 19–21	(silver) Runner-up

BWF Grand Prix Gold tournament
BWF Grand Prix tournament

== Filmography ==
=== Television show ===
Year	Title	Network	Role	Notes	Ref.
2021	Leader's Romance	IHQ	Cast Member		
