= Aprilia Yuswandari =

Indonesian badminton player

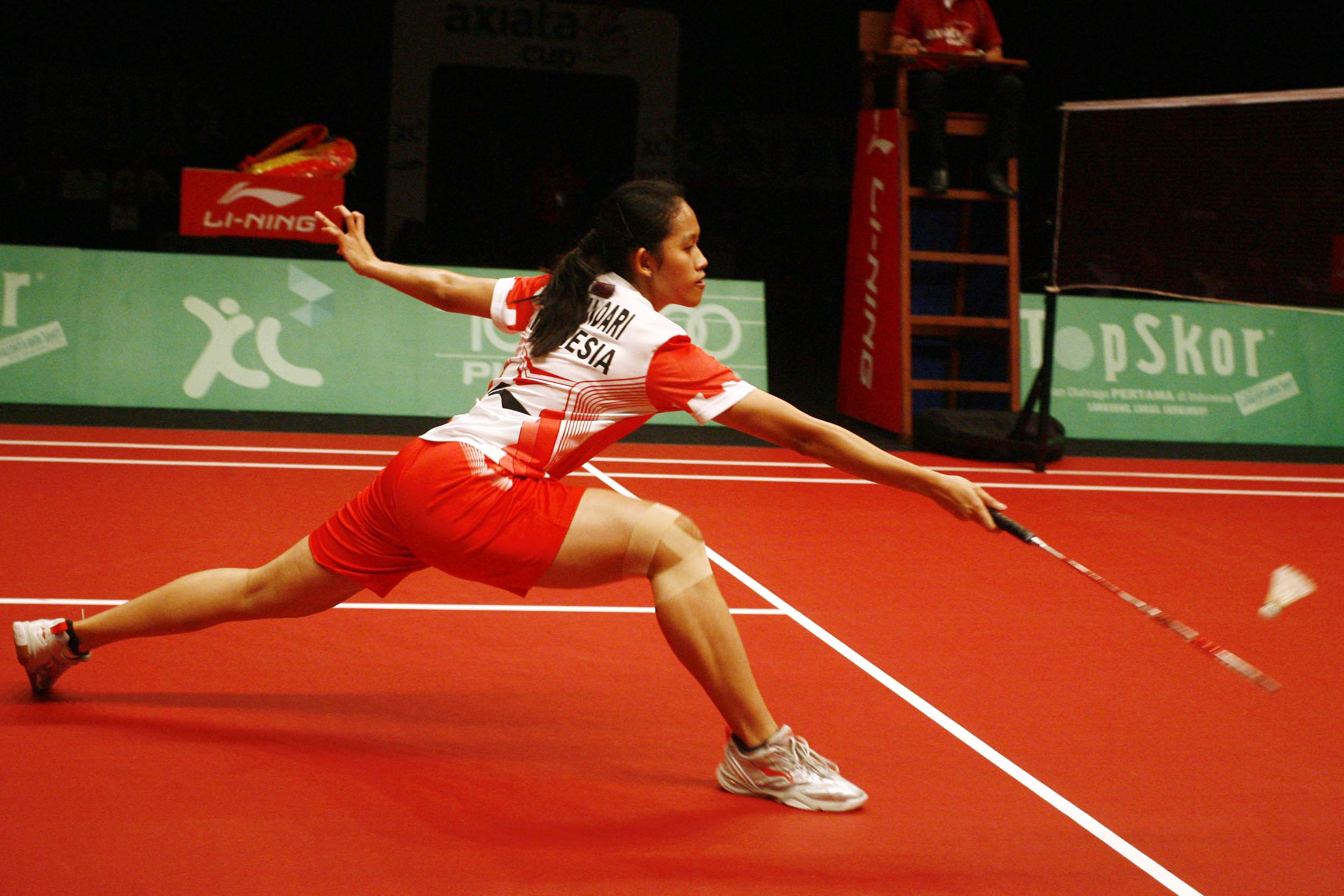

Personal information
- Born: 24 April 1988 (age 38) Bantul, Yogyakarta SR, Indonesia
- Height: 1.64 m (5 ft 5 in)
- Weight: 58 kg (128 lb)

Sport
- Country: Indonesia
- Sport: Badminton
- Handedness: Right

Women's singles
- Highest ranking: 21 (7 August 2013)
- BWF profile
Medal record
Women's badminton
Representing Indonesia
Asian Games
Bronze medal – third place	2010 Guangzhou	Women's team
Asian Junior Championships
Bronze medal – third place	2006 Kuala Lumpur	Mixed team

Aprilia Yuswandari (born 24 April 1988) is a badminton player from Indonesia. She was part of the Indonesia junior team that won the bronze medal at the 2006 Asian Junior Championships. Yuswandari who trained at the Pusdiklat Semen Gresik selected to join the national team in 2006. In 2010, she joined the Asian Games squad that won the women's team bronze after defeated by the Thai team in the semifinal.

== Achievements ==
=== ASEAN University Games ===
Women's singles
Year	Venue	Opponent	Score	Result	Ref.
2014	Dempo Sports Hall; Palembang, Indonesia	(Indonesia) Febby Angguni	17–21, 21–15, 20–22	Silver	

=== BWF Grand Prix (1 runner-up) ===
The BWF Grand Prix had two levels, the Grand Prix and Grand Prix Gold. It was a series of badminton tournaments sanctioned by the Badminton World Federation (BWF) and played between 2007 and 2017.

Women's singles
Year	Tournament	Opponent	Score	Result	Ref.
2012	Korea Grand Prix Gold	(South Korea) Sung Ji-hyun	10–21, 10–21	(silver) Runner-up	

BWF Grand Prix Gold tournament
BWF Grand Prix tournament

=== BWF International Challenge/Series (1 title, 2 runners-up) ===
Women's singles
Year	Tournament	Opponent	Score	Result	Ref.
2015	Vietnam International	(Japan) Kana Ito	21–14, 18–21, 11–18 retired	(silver) Runner-up	
2015	Indonesia International	(Indonesia) Fitriani	21–13, 13–21, 13–21	(silver) Runner-up	
2015	Hungarian International	(England) Chloe Birch	21–19, 21–9	(gold) Winner	

BWF International Challenge tournament
BWF International Series tournament

=== BWF Junior International (1 title, 1 runner-up) ===
Girls' singles
Year	Tournament	Opponent	Score	Result	Ref.
2007	Dutch Junior	(Indonesia) Maria Febe Kusumastuti	21–12, 16–21, 15–21	(silver) Runner-up	
2007	German Junior	(Indonesia) Maria Febe Kusumastuti	21–7, 18–21, 21–10	(gold) Winner	

BWF Junior International Grand Prix tournament
BWF Junior International Challenge tournament
BWF Junior International Series tournament
BWF Junior Future Series tournament

== Performance timeline ==
Key

W	Won	F	Finalist	SF	Semi-finalist
QF	Quarter-finalist	#R	Rounds 4, 3, 2, 1	RR	Round-robin stage
Q#	Qualification round	A	Absent	w/d	Withdrew
G	Gold	S	Silver	B	Bronze
NH	Not held	N/A	Not applicable	DNQ	Did not qualify

=== National team ===
- Junior level

Team event	2006
Asian Junior Championships	B

- Senior level

Team event	2010
Asian Games	B

=== Individual competitions ===
- Senior level

Events	2013
Southeast Asian Games	QF
World Championships	1R

Tournament	BWF Grand Prix		Best
Tournament	2012	2013	Best
Korea Masters	F	2R	F (2012)
Syed Modi International	QF	NH	QF (2012)

== Record against selected opponents ==
Includes results against Olympic quarterfinals, Worlds semifinalists, and Super Series finalists.

- (Bulgaria) Petya Nedelcheva 0–1
- (China) Wang Lin 0–1
- (China) Wang Xin 0–1
- (China) Wang Yihan 0–1
- (China) Xie Xingfang 0–1
- (China) Zhu Jingjing 0–1
- (China) Li Xuerui 0–1
- (China) Wang Shixian 0–1
- (Chinese Taipei) Cheng Shao-chieh 0–2
- (Chinese Taipei) Tai Tzu-ying 0–2
- (England) Tracey Hallam 0–1
- (Germany) Juliane Schenk 0–5
- (Germany) Xu Huaiwen 0–1
- (Hong Kong) Yip Pui Yin 0–1
- (Hong Kong) Zhou Mi 0–1
- (India) Saina Nehwal 0–3
- (Japan) Eriko Hirose 3–2
- (Japan) Minatsu Mitani 1–2
- (Japan) Sayaka Sato 0–1
- (Japan) Sayaka Takahashi 0–2
- (South Korea) Bae Youn-joo 0–2
- (South Korea) Sung Ji-hyun 1–3
- (Thailand) Porntip Buranaprasertsuk 0–2
- (Thailand) Ratchanok Intanon 1–2
