= Misbun Ramdan Misbun =

Malaysian badminton player

Misbun Ramdan
Personal information
- Nickname: Ramdan
- Born: Misbun Ramdan bin Mohmed Misbun; 1 March 1991 (age 35) Ampang, Kuala Lumpur, Malaysia

Sport
- Country: Malaysia
- Sport: Badminton

Men's singles
- Highest ranking: 42 (19 September 2013)
- Current ranking: 1171 (6 December 2022)
- BWF profile
Medal record
Men's badminton
Representing Malaysia
World Junior Championships
| Silver medal – second place | 2009 Alor Setar | Mixed team |
Asian Junior Championships
| Bronze medal – third place | 2009 Kuala Lumpur | Boys' singles |

Misbun Ramdan bin Mohmed Misbun (born 1 March 1991) is a Malaysian professional badminton player. He is the son of former Malaysian international badminton player Misbun Sidek.

== Career ==
Misbun Ramdan won his first local title by upsetting Mohd Arif Abdul Latif, 21–18, 21–18 in the men’s singles final of the 2012 Pahang Open. In the same year, he won his first national title by defeating Chong Wei Feng to become the new national champion.

In January 2013, Ramdan left Badminton Association of Malaysia (BAM) to train under his father, Misbun Sidek. In April 2014, Ramdan was invited by BAM for the selection trials of Thomas Cup. At the selection trial, he lost 21–19, 21–15 to Goh Soon Huat.

In 2015, Ramdan suffered an Achilles heel rupture that kept him from competing for almost 2 years. He came back in February 2017 to compete in the National Championships and reached the singles final. He eventually lost to defending champion Lim Chi Wing.

== Achievements ==
=== Asia Junior Championships ===
Boys' Singles
| Year | Venue | Opponent | Score | Result |
|---|---|---|---|---|
| 2009 | Stadium Juara; Kuala Lumpur, Malaysia | (Malaysia) Iskandar Zulkarnain Zainuddin | 7–21, 12–21 | Bronze |

=== BWF International Challenge/Series ===
Men's singles
| Year | Tournament | Opponent | Score | Result |
|---|---|---|---|---|
| 2018 | Lagos International | (Israel) Misha Zilberman | 21–11, 19–21, 12–21 | (silver) Runner-up |
| 2014 | Romanian International | (Poland) Adrian Dziolko | 15–21, 21–18, 21–16 | (gold) Winner |
| 2013 | Irish Open | (Germany) Dieter Domke | 21–13, 21–18 | (gold) Winner |
| 2013 | Hellas International | (Czech Republic) Jan Frohlich | 21–14, 21–13 | (gold) Winner |
| 2013 | Slovenian International | (France) Lucas Corvee | 21–11, 21–12 | (gold) Winner |
| 2013 | Portugal International | (Spain) Pablo Abian | 21–8, 21–9 | (gold) Winner |
| 2012 | French International | (India) Anand Pawar | 16–21, 10–21 | (silver) Runner-up |

BWF International Challenge tournament
BWF International Series tournament
