= Lin Yen-jui =

Taiwanese badminton player (born 1986)

Lin Yen-jui 林彥睿
Personal information
- Born: 22 September 1986 (age 40)
- Height: 1.80 m (5 ft 11 in)
- Weight: 78 kg (172 lb)

Sport
- Country: Taiwan
- Sport: Badminton
- Handedness: Right

Men's & mixed doubles
- Highest ranking: 84 (MD) 16 February 2012; 107 (XD) 2 May 2013
- BWF profile
Medal record
Badminton
Representing Chinese Taipei
Summer Universiade
Bronze medal – third place	2013 Kazan	Mixed team

Lin Yen-jui (Chinese: 林彥睿; pinyin: Lín Yànruì; born 22 September 1986) is a Taiwanese badminton player. In 2013, he competed at the Kazan Summer Universiade and won bronze in the mixed team event.

== Achievements ==
=== BWF International Challenge/Series ===
Men's doubles
Year	Tournament	Partner	Opponent	Score	Result
2012	Singapore International	(Chinese Taipei) Liao Chun-Chieh	(Chinese Taipei) Liang Jui-wei (Chinese Taipei) Liao Kuan-hao	11–21, 15–21	(silver) Runner-up
2011	Malaysia International	(Chinese Taipei) Chen Chung-jen	(Japan) Takeshi Kamura (Japan) Keigo Sonoda	13–21, 17–21	(silver) Runner-up
2008	Hellas International	(Chinese Taipei) Chien Yu-hsun	(Chinese Taipei) Chen Hung-ling (Chinese Taipei) Lin Yu-lang	21–19, 22–20	(gold) Winner

BWF International Challenge tournament
BWF International Series tournament
