= Chen Chung-jen =

Taiwanese badminton player

Chen Chung-jen 陳中仁
Personal information
- Born: 14 April 1989 (age 37)

Sport
- Country: Taiwan
- Sport: Badminton

Men's & mixed doubles
- Highest ranking: 48 (MD) 16 February 2012; 153 (XD) 20 September 2012
- BWF profile

Chen Chung-jen (Chinese: 陳中仁; born 14 April 1989) is a Taiwanese badminton player. In 2013, he won the men's doubles titles at the Polish and Singapore International tournament partnered with Wang Chi-lin.

== Achievements ==
=== BWF International Challenge/Series ===
Men's Doubles
Year	Tournament	Partner	Opponent	Score	Result
2013	Czech International	(Chinese Taipei) Wang Chi-lin	(Poland) Adam Cwalina (Poland) Przemysław Wacha	22–20, 20–22, 12–21	(silver) Runner-up
2013	Polish International	(Chinese Taipei) Wang Chi-lin	(Indonesia) Christopher Rusdianto (Indonesia) Trikusuma Wardhana	22–24, 21–14, 21–14	(gold) Winner
2013	Singapore International	(Chinese Taipei) Wang Chi-lin	(Malaysia) Jagdish Singh (Malaysia) Roni Tan Wee Long	21–12, 25–27, 21–16	(gold) Winner
2011	Malaysia International	(Chinese Taipei) Lin Yen-jui	(Japan) Takeshi Kamura (Japan) Keigo Sonoda	13–21, 17–21	(silver) Runner-up

BWF International Challenge tournament
BWF International Series tournament
