= Hera Desi =

Indonesian badminton player (born 1992)

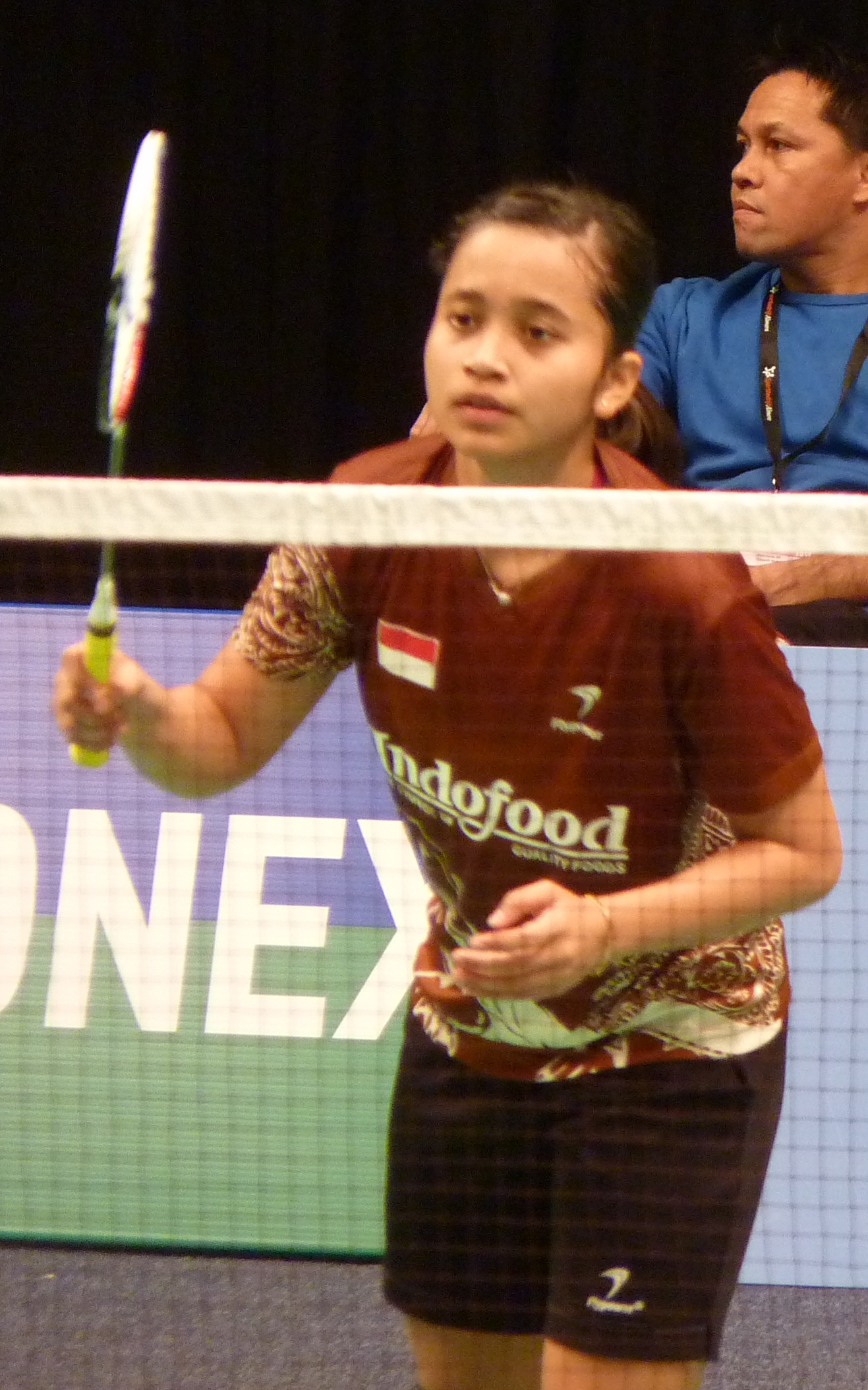

Personal information
- Born: Hera Desi Ana Rachmawati; 2 December 1992 (age 33) Purworejo, Central Java, Indonesia
- Height: 1.62 m (5 ft 4 in)

Sport
- Country: Indonesia
- Sport: Badminton
- Handedness: Right

Women's singles
- Highest ranking: 29 (April 2014)
- BWF profile
Medal record
Women's badminton
Representing Indonesia
Summer Universiade
Gold medal – first place	2011 Shenzhen	Mixed team

Hera Desi Ana Rachmawati or simply Hera Desi (born 2 December 1992) is an Indonesian badminton player.

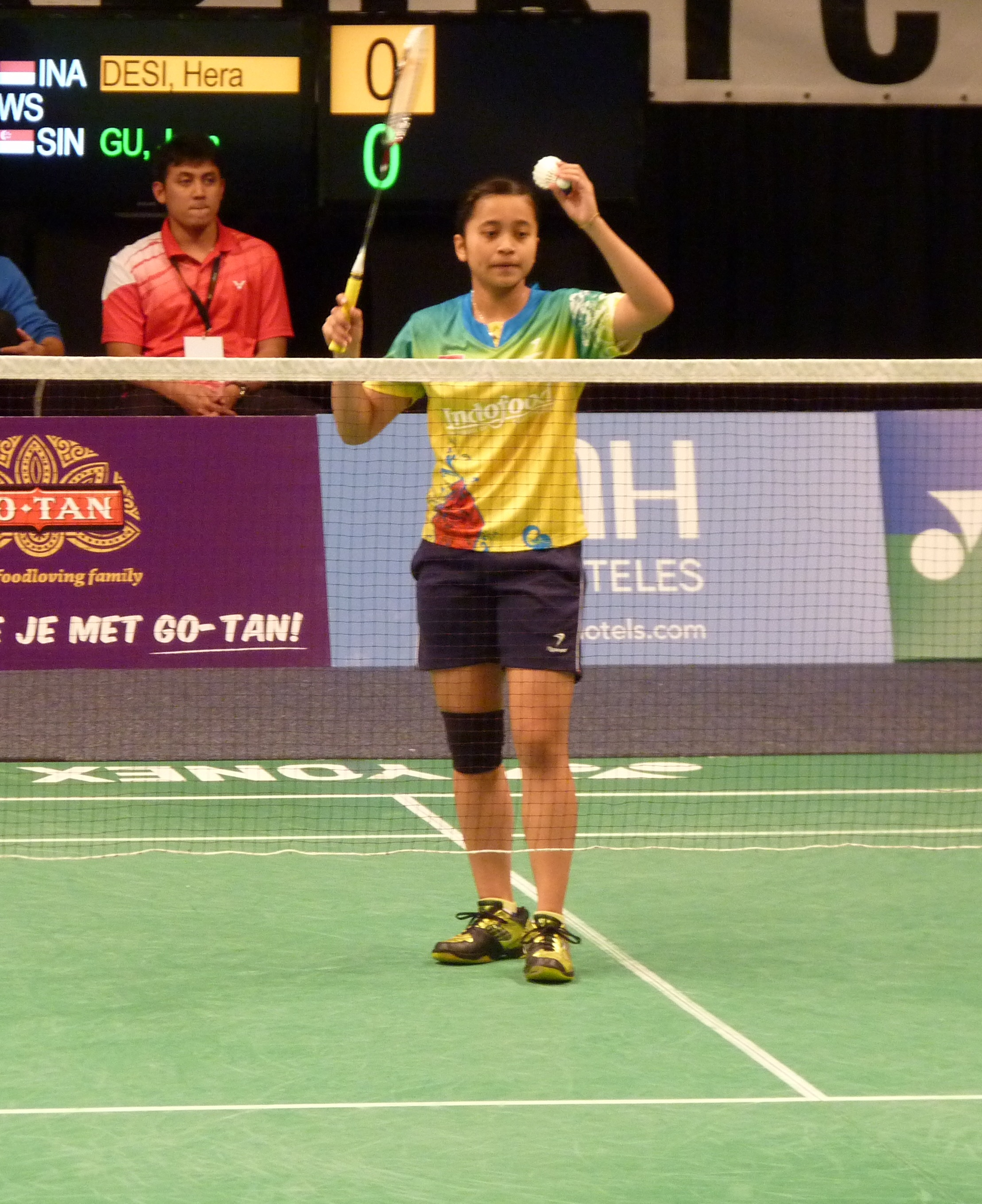
Hera Desi at the 2013 Dutch Open

== Achievements ==
=== BWF Grand Prix ===
The BWF Grand Prix had two levels, the Grand Prix and Grand Prix Gold. It was a series of badminton tournaments sanctioned by the Badminton World Federation (BWF) and played between 2007 and 2017.

Women's singles
Year	Tournament	Opponent	Score	Result	Ref.
2013	Vietnam Open	(China) He Bingjiao	10–21, 6–21	(silver) Runner-up	

BWF Grand Prix Gold tournament
BWF Grand Prix tournament

=== BWF International Challenge/Series ===
Women's singles
Year	Tournament	Opponent	Score	Result	Ref.
2011	Malaysia International	(Indonesia) Bellaetrix Manuputty	19–21, 21–19, 12–21	(silver) Runner-up	
2012	Indonesia International	(South Korea) Bae Seung-hee	21–16, 21–18	(gold) Winner	
2014	Indonesia International	(Japan) Mayu Matsumoto	10–11, 11–10, 6–11, 11–10, 9–11	(silver) Runner-up	

BWF International Challenge tournament
BWF International Series tournament
