= Christopher Rusdianto =

Indonesian badminton player

Personal information
- Born: 22 September 1990 (age 36) Surabaya, East Java, Indonesia
- Height: 1.70 m (5 ft 7 in)

Sport
- Country: Indonesia
- Sport: Badminton
- Handedness: Right

Men's doubles
- Highest ranking: 33 (18 October 2012)
- BWF profile

Christopher Rusdianto (born 22 September 1990) is an Indonesian badminton player.

== Career ==
Rusdianto comes from Suryanaga Surabaya badminton club, then in 2009 he joined the Indonesia national badminton team. In 2011, he became the runner-up at the India Grand Prix Gold tournament in the men's doubles event with Andrei Adistia. At the Giraldilla International tournament in Cuba, he became the champion in the men's and mixed doubles events. He also won the 2011 Bahrain International tournament with Adistia, after defeating top-ranked Indian pair and defending champions Rupesh Kumar and Sanave Thomas. In 2013, he became the champion at the Croatian International tournament in the men's doubles event partnered with Trikusuma Wardhana.

== Achievements ==
=== BWF Grand Prix ===
The BWF Grand Prix had two levels, the BWF Grand Prix and Grand Prix Gold. It was a series of badminton tournaments sanctioned by the Badminton World Federation (BWF) which was held from 2007 to 2017.

Men's doubles
Year	Tournament	Partner	Opponent	Score	Result
2011	India Grand Prix Gold	(Indonesia) Andrei Adistia	(Japan) Naoki Kawamae (Japan) Shoji Sato	17–21, 21–12, 21–23	(silver) Runner-up

BWF Grand Prix Gold tournament
BWF Grand Prix tournament

=== BWF International Challenge/Series ===
Men's doubles
Year	Tournament	Partner	Opponent	Score	Result
2011	Giraldilla International	(Indonesia) Berry Angriawan	(Brazil) Luiz dos Santos (Brazil) Alex Tjong	21–10, 21–12	(gold) Winner
2011	Bahrain International	(Indonesia) Andrei Adistia	(India) K. T. Rupesh Kumar (India) Sanave Thomas	14–21, 21–17, 21–13	(gold) Winner
2013	Croatian International	(Indonesia) Trikusuma Wardhana	(Croatia) Zvonimir Durkinjak (Croatia) Zvonimir Hoelbling	21–14, 22–20	(gold) Winner
2013	Polish International	(Indonesia) Trikusuma Wardhana	(Chinese Taipei) Chen Chung-jen (Chinese Taipei) Wang Chi-lin	24–22, 14–21, 14–21	(silver) Runner-up

Mixed doubles
Year	Tournament	Partner	Opponent	Score	Result
2011	Giraldilla International	(Indonesia) Dwi Agustiawati	(Indonesia) Berry Angriawan (Indonesia) Ayu Rahmasari	17–21, 21–14, 21–12	(gold) Winner

BWF International Challenge tournament
BWF International Series tournament
BWF Future Series tournament
