= 2013 Malaysia Grand Prix Gold =

Tournament details
- Dates: 30 April–4 May
- Level: Grand Prix Gold
- Total prize money: US$120,000
- Venue: Juara Indoor Stadium
- Location: Kuala Lumpur, Malaysia

Champions
- Men's singles: (Indonesia) Alamsyah Yunus
- Women's singles: (India) P. V. Sindhu
- Men's doubles: (Malaysia) Goh V Shem (Malaysia) Lim Khim Wah
- Women's doubles: (Indonesia) Pia Zebadiah Bernadeth (Indonesia) Rizki Amelia Pradipta
- Mixed doubles: (Indonesia) Praveen Jordan (Indonesia) Vita Marissa

The 2013 Malaysia Grand Prix Gold was the fifth grand prix gold and grand prix tournament of the 2013 BWF Grand Prix Gold and Grand Prix. The tournament was held in Juara Indoor Stadium, Kuala Lumpur, Malaysia from 30 April to 4 May 2013 and had a total purse of $120,000.

== Men's singles ==
=== Seeds ===
1. (Malaysia) Lee Chong Wei (withdrew)
2. (Indonesia) Sony Dwi Kuncoro (withdrew)
3. (Malaysia) Daren Liew (quarter-final)
4. (Malaysia) Chong Wei Feng (second round)
5. (Indonesia) Tommy Sugiarto (withdrew)
6. (Indonesia) Simon Santoso (withdrew)
7. (Thailand) Tanongsak Saensomboonsuk (third round)
8. (Indonesia) Dionysius Hayom Rumbaka (withdrew)
9. (China) Chen Yuekun (semi-final)
10. (Malaysia) Mohd Arif Abdul Latif (second round)
11. (India) Rajah Menuri Venkata Gurusaidutt (quarter-final)
12. (Indonesia) Alamsyah Yunus (champion)
13. (Indonesia) Andre Kurniawan Tedjono (first round)
14. (Thailand) Suppanyu Avihingsanon (second round)
15. (Singapore) Derek Wong Zi Liang (third round)
16. (Singapore) Ashton Chen Yong Zhao (first round)

=== Finals ===
Quarterfinals
11	(India) R. M. V. Gurusaidutt	19	2^{r}
(Malaysia) Iskandar Zulkarnain Zainuddin	21	5
(Hong Kong) Chan Yan Kit	17	15
(Malaysia) Goh Soon Huat	21	21
9	(China) Chen Yuekun	21	22
3	(Malaysia) Daren Liew	10	20
12	(Indonesia) Alamsyah Yunus	21	15	22
(Hong Kong) Wei Nan	18	21	20

Semifinals
(Malaysia) Iskandar Zulkarnain Zainuddin	18	21	16
(Malaysia) Goh Soon Huat	21	18	21
9	(China) Chen Yuekun	22	17	11
12	(Indonesia) Alamsyah Yunus	20	21	21

Final
(Malaysia) Goh Soon Huat	21	9	19
12	(Indonesia) Alamsyah Yunus	10	21	21

=== Top half ===
==== Section 1 ====
First Round
1	(Malaysia) Lee C W
Q3	(Malaysia) Gwee K Y	w	/	o
(Japan) R Takeshita	21	21
(Malaysia) Kuan B H	16	10
11	(India) R M V Gurusaidutt	21	14	21
(Singapore) Huang C	19	21	17
(Malaysia) Goh G C	21	21
(Indonesia) Siswanto	15	16

Second Round
Q3	(Malaysia) Gwee K Y	6	17
(Japan) R Takeshita	21	21
11	(India) R M V Gurusaidutt	21	21
(Malaysia) Goh G C	8	9

Third Round
(Japan) R Takeshita	19	16
11	(India) R M V Gurusaidutt	21	21

==== Section 2 ====
First Round
5	(Indonesia) T Sugiarto
(India) P Kumar	w	/	o
Q1	(Malaysia) Chong L Q	20	13
(Malaysia) I Z Zainuddin	22	21
13	(Indonesia) A K Tedjono	16	19
Q2	(South Korea) Hwan J-s	21	21
(South Korea) Lee D-k	21	21
(Maldives) M A Rasheed	9	14

Second Round
(India) P Kumar	21	14	15
(Malaysia) I Z Zainuddin	15	21	21
Q2	(South Korea) Hwang J-s	21	21	20
(South Korea) Lee D-k	16	23	21

Third Round
(Malaysia) I Z Zainuddin	21	15	21
(South Korea) Lee D-k	12	21	19

==== Section 3 ====
First Round
4	(Malaysia) Chong W F	21	21
Q5	(Malaysia) Woon M H	11	6
(Malaysia) Ai W J	10	9
(India) S Verma	21	21
10	(Malaysia) M A Abdul Latif	21	21
(Indonesia) A Pratama	15	14
(India) A Singh
(Hong Kong) Chan Y K	w	/	o

Second Round
4	(Malaysia) Chong W F	15	21	19
(India) S Verma	21	16	21
10	(Malaysia) M A Abdul Latif	15	18
(Hong Kong) Chan Y K	21	21

Third Round
(India) S Verma	15	19
(Hong Kong) Chan Y K	21	21

==== Section 4 ====
First Round
7	(Thailand) T Saensomboonsuk	21	24
(Malaysia) M H Hashim	18	22
(Hong Kong) Ng K L	21	21
(Singapore) R Gonansa	10	17
16	(Singapore) A Chen	18	14
(Malaysia) Z Zulkiffli	21	21
(Indonesia) E Sukamta	15	9
(Malaysia) Goh S H	21	21

Second Round
7	(Thailand) T Saensomboonsuk	21	21
(Hong Kong) Ng K L	19	18
(Malaysia) Z Zulkiffli	21	16	11
(Malaysia) Goh S H	18	21	21

Third Round
7	(Thailand) T Saensomboonsuk	18	13
(Malaysia) Goh S H	21	21

=== Bottom half ===
==== Section 5 ====
First Round
(New Zealand) J Wu	12	16
(Malaysia) Chiang J S	21	21
(Japan) Y Kaneko	9	15
9	(China) Chen YK	21	21
(Malaysia) B Wong	7	21	21
(India) O Bansal	21	16	15
(Japan) T Inoue	w	/	o
8	(Indonesia) D H Rumbaka

Second Round
(Malaysia) Chiang J S	11	12
9	(China) Chen YK	21	21
(Malaysia) B Wong	21	21
(Japan) T Inoue	19	17

Third Round
9	(China) Chen YK	21	21
(Malaysia) B Wong	6	7

==== Section 6 ====
First Round
(South Korea) Park S-m	13	11
(India) S Kidambi	21	21
(Indonesia) A G Dharma	22	13	15
14	(Thailand) S Avihingsanon	20	21	21
Q6	(China) Huang YX	21	21
(Malaysia) Zh Zulkiffli	8	11
(Indonesia) K B Alexander	21	12	11
3	(Malaysia) D Liew	15	21	21

Second Round
(India) S Kidambi	21	21
14	(Thailand) S Avihingsanon	9	19
Q6	(China) Huang YX	18	14
3	(Malaysia) D Liew	21	21

Third Round
(India) S Kidambi	17	20
3	(Malaysia) D Liew	21	22

==== Section 7 ====
First Round
(Hong Kong) Tam C H	18	18
(Singapore) Loh K Y	21	21
Q7	(Malaysia) V Ong	14	14
12	(Indonesia) A Yunus	21	21
Q8	(Indonesia) K H Wibowo	18	9
(Malaysia) N M Azriyn Ayub	21	21
(Malaysia) Chan K B	w	/	o
6	(Indonesia) S Santoso

Second Round
(Singapore) Loh K Y	19	19
12	(Indonesia) A Yunus	21	21
(Malaysia) N M Azriyn Ayub	15	21	9
(Malaysia) Chan K B	21	14	21

Third Round
12	(Indonesia) A Yunus	21	21
(Malaysia) Chan K B	16	16

==== Section 8 ====
First Round
(South Korea) Hong J-h	21	21
Q4	(Singapore) S Lee	12	15
(Indonesia) A Marteen	16	16
15	(Singapore) D Wong	21	21
(Malaysia) Loh W S	15	21	17
(Hong Kong) Wei N	21	19	21
(Malaysia) K Yogendran	w	/	o
2	(Indonesia) S D Kuncoro

Second Round
(South Korea) Hong J-h	11	14
15	(Singapore) D Wong	21	21
(Hong Kong) Wei N	21	21
(Malaysia) K Yogendran	13	18

Third Round
15	(Singapore) D Wong	15	16
(Hong Kong) Wei N	21	21

== Women's singles ==
=== Seeds ===
1. (India) P. V. Sindhu (champion)
2. (Thailand) Busanan Ongbumrungpan (semi-final)
3. (Thailand) Sapsiree Taerattanachai (semi-final)
4. (Thailand) Nichaon Jindapon (second round)
5. (Singapore) Gu Juan (final)
6. (Malaysia) Sonia Cheah Su Ya (first round)
7. (Indonesia) Hera Desi (quarter-final)
8. (Malaysia) Tee Jing Yi (quarter-final)

=== Finals ===
Semifinals
1	(India) P. V. Sindhu	21	21
3	(Thailand) Sapsiree Taerattanachai	17	11
5	(Singapore) Gu Juan	21	21
2	(Thailand) Busanan Ongbumrungpan	18	19

Final
1	(India) P. V. Sindhu	21	17	21
5	(Singapore) Gu Juan	17	21	19

=== Top half ===
==== Section 1 ====
First Round
1	(India) P V Sindhu	21	19	21
(Singapore) Chen JY	13	21	13
(Hong Kong) Cheung N Y	21	21
(South Korea) Kim H-m	17	14
7	(Indonesia) H Desi	21	11	21
(Thailand) P Chochuwong	12	21	7
(Malaysia) L Cheah	21	21
(Indonesia) M Wiranto	16	17

Second Round
1	(India) P V Sindhu	11	21	21
(Hong Kong) Cheung N Y	21	18	10
7	(Indonesia) H Desi	21	21
(Malaysia) L Cheah	12	17

Quarterfinals
1	(India) P V Sindhu	21	21
7	(Indonesia) H Desi	17	17

==== Section 2 ====
First Round
3	(Thailand) S Taerattanachai	21	21
(Malaysia) Yang L L	15	15
(China) Yao X	21	21
(India) P C Thulasi	18	5
8	(Malaysia) Tee J Y	21	21
Q4	(South Korea) Lee M-j	17	8
(Indonesia) F Angguni	10	15
(Singapore) Xing AY	21	21

Second Round
3	(Thailand) S Taerattanachai	12	21	21
(China) Yao X	21	15	14
8	(Malaysia) Tee J Y	21	21
(Singapore) Xing AY	12	17

Quarterfinals
3	(Thailand) S Taerattanachai	22	21
(Malaysia) Tee J Y	20	13

=== Bottom half ===
==== Section 3 ====
First Round
(India) A Pantawane	21	10	14
(Indonesia) M F Kusumastuti	13	21	21
(Chinese Taipei) Cheng S-c	9	21	20
5	(Singapore) Gu J	21	18	22
Q1	(Japan) A Ohori	21	21
Q3	(Malaysia) Lim C S	12	12
(Austria) S Prutsch	11	14
4	(Thailand) N Jindapon	21	21

Second Round
(Indonesia) M F Kusumastuti	17	21	18
5	(Singapore) Gu J	21	10	21
Q1	(Japan) A Ohori	21	21
4	(Thailand) N Jindapon	10	19

Quarterfinals
5	(Singapore) Gu J	15	21	21
Q1	(Japan) A Ohori	21	18	19

==== Section 4 ====
First Round
(India) T Lad	8	14
(Japan) K Ito	21	21
(Singapore) Liang XY	14	21	21
6	(Malaysia) S Cheah	21	16	17
Q2	(Thailand) S Suwannakitborihan	21	21
(South Korea) Kim S-j	10	17
(New Zealand) A Rankin	5	8
2	(Thailand) B Ongbumrungpan	21	21

Second Round
(Japan) K Ito	21	14	21
(Singapore) Liang XY	16	21	12
Q2	(Thailand) S Suwannakitborihan	13	11
2	(Thailand) B Ongbumrungpan	21	21

Quarterfinals
(Japan) K Ito	18	12
2	(Thailand) B Ongbumrungpan	21	21

== Men's doubles ==
=== Seeds ===
1. (Malaysia) Koo Kien Keat / Tan Boon Heong (final)
2. (Malaysia) Hoon Thien How / Tan Wee Kiong (quarter-final)
3. (Malaysia) Goh V Shem / Lim Khim Wah (champion)
4. (Malaysia) Mohd Zakry Abdul Latif / Mohd Fairuzizuan Mohd Tazari (semi-final)
5. (Malaysia) Gan Teik Chai / Ong Soon Hock (second round)
6. (Indonesia) Markis Kido / Alvent Yulianto (semi-final)
7. (Indonesia) Yonathan Suryatama Dasuki / Hendra Aprida Gunawan (first round)
8. (Malaysia) Chooi Kah Ming / Ow Yao Han (second round)

=== Finals ===
Semifinals
1	(Malaysia) Koo Kien Keat (Malaysia) Tan Boon Heong	17	21	21
4	(Malaysia) Mohd Zakry Abdul Latif (Malaysia) Mohd Fairuzizuan Mohd Tazari	21	14	16
3	(Malaysia) Goh V Shem (Malaysia) Lim Khim Wah	17	21	21
6	(Indonesia) Markis Kido (Indonesia) Alvent Yulianto	21	12	15

Final
1	(Malaysia) Koo Kien Keat (Malaysia) Tan Boon Heong	20	15
3	(Malaysia) Goh V Shem (Malaysia) Lim Khim Wah	22	21

=== Top half ===
==== Section 1 ====
First Round
1	(Malaysia) Koo K K (Malaysia) Tan B H	13	21	21
Q3	(Malaysia) Ong J G (Malaysia) Teo K S	21	13	14
(Indonesia) R Alexander (Indonesia) S Geh	21	21
(Malaysia) N Heg (Malaysia) Teo E Y	12	18
7	(Indonesia) Y S Dasuki (Indonesia) H A Gunawan	19	6
(Thailand) B Issara (Thailand) P Vilailak	21	21
(Japan) T Inoue (Japan) Y Kaneko	21	21
(Indonesia) H Faisal (Indonesia) P E Rhoma	17	14

Second Round
1	(Malaysia) Koo K K (Malaysia) Tan B H	21	21
(Indonesia) R Alexander (Indonesia) S Geh	16	11
(Thailand) B Issara (Thailand) P Vilailak	21	21
(Japan) T Inoue (Japan) Y Kaneko	17	18

Quarterfinals
1	(Malaysia) Koo K K (Malaysia) Tan B H	21	21
(Thailand) B Issara (Thailand) P Vilailak	16	7

==== Section 2 ====
First Round
4	(Malaysia) M Z Abdul Latif (Malaysia) M F M Tazari	15	21	21
(Singapore) D B Chrisnanta (Singapore) Liu Y	21	13	12
(India) S. Sanjeeth (India) J Yadav	16	17
(Indonesia) Hardianto (Indonesia) A P R Putra	21	21
5	(Malaysia) Gan T C (Malaysia) Ong S H	22	16	21
(Hong Kong) Chan T K (Hong Kong) Lo L K	20	21	17
(Malaysia) Chow P C (Malaysia) Tan B S	18	23	21
(Indonesia) C Rusdianto (Indonesia) T Wardhana	21	21	16

Second Round
4	(Malaysia) M Z Abdul Latif (Malaysia) M F M Tazari	22	21
(Indonesia) Hardianto (Indonesia) A P R Putra	20	16
5	(Malaysia) Gan T C (Malaysia) Ong S H	17	22
(Malaysia) Chow P C (Malaysia) Tan B S	21	24

Quarterfinals
4	(Malaysia) M Z Abdul Latif (Malaysia) M F M Tazari	25	21	21
(Malaysia) Chow P C (Malaysia) Tan B S	27	12	12

=== Bottom half ===
==== Section 3 ====
First Round
(Hong Kong) Chan Y L (Hong Kong) Wong W H	15	14
(Indonesia) A Adistia (Indonesia) M F Gideon	21	21
Q4	(Malaysia) M R Abdul Latif (Malaysia) M H Hashim	16	12
8	(Malaysia) Chooi K M (Malaysia) Ow Y H	21	21
(Singapore) T Hee (Singapore) T Yeo	22	21
(Japan) K Itani (Japan) T Takashina	20	18
(Indonesia) W Nayaka (Indonesia) A Yusuf	18	17
3	(Malaysia) Goh V S (Malaysia) Lim K W	21	21

Second Round
(Indonesia) A Adistia (Indonesia) M F Gideon	21	21
8	(Malaysia) Chooi K M (Malaysia) Ow Y H	19	17
(Singapore) T Hee (Singapore) T Yeo	15	20
3	(Malaysia) Goh V S (Malaysia) Lim K W	21	22

Quarterfinals
(Indonesia) A Adistia (Indonesia) M F Gideon	21	19	18
3	(Malaysia) Goh V S (Malaysia) Lim K W	14	21	21

==== Section 4 ====
First Round
(Malaysia) Low J S (Malaysia) Tan Y J	23	19	9
(Thailand) M Jongjit (Thailand) N Puangpuapech	21	21	21
Q1	(Hong Kong) F Kurniawan (Hong Kong) Lee C H	15	11
6	(Indonesia) M Kido (Indonesia) A Yulianto	21	21
(Singapore) A Chen (Singapore) D Wong	18	9
Q2	(China) Chen ZF (China) Lu K	21	21
(Indonesia) R A Nugroho (Indonesia) K S Sukamuljo	16	8
2	(Malaysia) Hoon T H (Malaysia) Tan W K	21	21

Second Round
(Thailand) M Jongjit (Thailand) N Puangpuapech	18	20
6	(Indonesia) M Kido (Indonesia) A Yulianto	21	22
Q2	(China) Chen ZF (China) Lu K	16	19
2	(Malaysia) Hoon T H (Malaysia) Tan W K	21	21

Quarterfinals
6	(Indonesia) M Kido (Indonesia) A Yulianto	21	21
2	(Malaysia) Hoon T H (Malaysia) Tan W K	15	11

== Women's doubles ==
=== Seeds ===
1. (Indonesia) Pia Zebadiah Bernadeth / Rizki Amelia Pradipta (champion)
2. (Malaysia) Vivian Hoo Kah Mun / Woon Khe Wei (quarter-final)
3. (Malaysia) Goh Liu Ying / Lim Yin Loo (semi-final)
4. (Malaysia) Amelia Alicia Anscelly / Soong Fie Cho (second round)

=== Finals ===
Semifinals
1	(Indonesia) Pia Zebadiah Bernadeth (Indonesia) Rizki Amelia Pradipta	21	17	21
3	(Malaysia) Goh Liu Ying (Malaysia) Lim Yin Loo	15	21	18
(Indonesia) Vita Marissa (Indonesia) Aprilsasi Variella	8	21	21
(Singapore) Vanessa Neo (Singapore) Yao Lei	21	19	13

Final
1	(Indonesia) Pia Zebadiah Bernadeth (Indonesia) Rizki Amelia Pradipta	21	16	21
(Indonesia) Vita Marissa (Indonesia) Aprilsasi Variella	17	21	17

=== Top half ===
==== Section 1 ====
First Round
1	(Indonesia) P Z Bernadeth (Indonesia) R A Pradipta
BYE
(Malaysia) Lim P Y (Malaysia) Lim P Z
BYE
(Japan) S Yamaguchi (Japan) S Yamamoto
BYE
(Thailand) N Saengchote (Thailand) S Suwannakitborihan	9	16
(Malaysia) Chow M K (Malaysia) Lee M Y	21	21

Second Round
1	(Indonesia) P Z Bernadeth (Indonesia) R A Pradipta	21	21
(Malaysia) Lim P Y (Malaysia) Lim P Z	3	6
(Japan) S Yamaguchi (Japan) S Yamamoto	9	21	14
(Malaysia) Chow M K (Malaysia) Lee M Y	21	12	21

Quarterfinals
1	(Indonesia) P Z Bernadeth (Indonesia) R A Pradipta	21	21
(Malaysia) Chow M K (Malaysia) Lee M Y	13	18

==== Section 2 ====
First Round
3	(Malaysia) Goh L Y (Malaysia) Lim Y L
BYE
(China) Huang YQ (China) Luo Y	21	21
(Malaysia) Teoh M X (Malaysia) Too S Y	4	7
(Thailand) A Serithammarak (Thailand) P Munkitamorn
BYE
(Malaysia) E Khoo (Malaysia) See TCV	16	21	12
(Singapore) Fu MT (Singapore) S M Sari	21	11	21

Second Round
3	(Malaysia) Goh L Y (Malaysia) Lim Y L	21	13	21
(China) Huang YQ (China) Luo Y	11	21	12
(Thailand) A Serithammarak (Thailand) P Munkitamorn	14	17
(Singapore) Fu MT (Singapore) S M Sari	21	21

Quarterfinals
3	(Malaysia) Goh L Y (Malaysia) Lim Y L	21	21
(Singapore) Fu MT (Singapore) S M Sari	15	17

=== Bottom half ===
==== Section 3 ====
First Round
(Hong Kong) Chau H W (Hong Kong) Shek H Y	21	20	18
(Indonesia) S D Aulia (Indonesia) I M Khairunnisa	15	22	21
BYE
(Indonesia) V Marissa (Indonesia) A Variella
(Japan) R Eto (Japan) A Shimozaki	8	21	14
(Indonesia) M D Oktavianti (Indonesia) R E Putri Sari	21	11	21
BYE
4	(Malaysia) A A Anscelly (Malaysia) Soong F C

Second Round
(Indonesia) S D Aulia (Indonesia) I M Khairunnisa	18	19
(Indonesia) V Marissa (Indonesia) A Variella	21	21
(Indonesia) M D Oktavianti (Indonesia) R E Putri Sari	22	21
4	(Malaysia) A A Anscelly (Malaysia) Soong F C	20	17

Quarterfinals
(Indonesia) V Marissa (Indonesia) A Variella	24	21
(Indonesia) M D Oktavianti (Indonesia) R E Putri Sari	22	9

==== Section 4 ====
First Round
(Singapore) Gu J (Singapore) Liang XY	21	21
(New Zealand) A Rankin (New Zealand) M Stapleton	8	8
BYE
(Singapore) V Neo (Singapore) Yao L
(Indonesia) M D Giovani (Indonesia) M Oklamona	17	13
(Thailand) P Chochuwong (Thailand) S Taerattanachai	21	21
BYE
2	(Malaysia) V Hoo (Malaysia) Woon K W

Second Round
(Singapore) Gu J (Singapore) Liang XY	15	10
(Singapore) V Neo (Singapore) Yao L	21	21
(Thailand) P Chochuwong (Thailand) S Taerattanachai	11	13
2	(Malaysia) V Hoo (Malaysia) Woon K W	21	21

Quarterfinals
(Singapore) V Neo (Singapore) Yao L	21	13	21
2	(Malaysia) V Hoo (Malaysia) Woon K W	13	21	19

== Mixed doubles ==
=== Seeds ===
1. (Malaysia) Chan Peng Soon / Goh Liu Ying (semi-final)
2. (Indonesia) Markis Kido / Pia Zebadiah Bernadeth (second round)
3. (Singapore) Danny Bawa Chrisnanta / Vanessa Neo (second round)
4. (Malaysia) Tan Aik Quan / Lai Pei Jing (final)

=== Finals ===
Semifinals
1	(Malaysia) Chan Peng Soon (Malaysia) Goh Liu Ying	17	12
(Indonesia) Praveen Jordan (Indonesia) Vita Marissa	21	21
4	(Malaysia) Tan Aik Quan (Malaysia) Lai Pei Jing	13	21	21
(Indonesia) Marcus Fernaldi Gideon (Indonesia) Aprilsasi Variella	21	15	13

Final
(Indonesia) Praveen Jordan (Indonesia) Vita Marissa	20	21	21
4	(Malaysia) Tan Aik Quan (Malaysia) Lai Pei Jing	22	13	17

=== Top half ===
==== Section 1 ====
First Round
1	(Malaysia) Chan P S (Malaysia) Goh L Y
BYE
(Hong Kong) Lee C H (Hong Kong) Chau H W	21	21
(Indonesia) A E Prasetya (Indonesia) W Anggraini	16	9
(China) Lu K (China) Luo Y
BYE
(Malaysia) Chooi K M (Malaysia) Chow M K	22	14	21
(Indonesia) A Yulianto (Indonesia) R A Pradipta	20	21	15

Second Round
1	(Malaysia) Chan P S (Malaysia) Goh L Y	21	19	21
(Hong Kong) Lee C H (Hong Kong) Chau H W	18	21	17
(China) Lu K (China) Luo Y	21	22
(Malaysia) Chooi K M (Malaysia) Chow M K	15	20

Quarterfinals
1	(Malaysia) Chan P S (Malaysia) Goh L Y	21	21
(China) Lu K (China) Luo Y	12	19

==== Section 2 ====
First Round
3	(Singapore) D B Chrisnanta (Singapore) V Neo
BYE
(Indonesia) E Subaktiar (Indonesia) G E Widjaja	21	21
(Malaysia) Wong F Y (Malaysia) S J Lai	17	15
(Malaysia) Ong J G (Malaysia) Lim Y L	21	21
(Singapore) T Hee (Singapore) Fu MT	8	12
(Malaysia) M L Z Abdul Khalid (Malaysia) A A Anscelly	21	9	16
(Indonesia) P Jordan (Indonesia) V Marissa	15	21	21

Second Round
3	(Singapore) D B Chrisnanta (Singapore) V Neo	21	17	18
(Indonesia) E Subaktiar (Indonesia) G E Widjaja	11	21	21
(Malaysia) Ong J G (Malaysia) Lim Y L	18	13
(Indonesia) P Jordan (Indonesia) V Marissa	21	21

Quarterfinals
(Indonesia) E Subaktiar (Indonesia) G E Widjaja	17	16
(Indonesia) P Jordan (Indonesia) V Marissa	21	21

=== Bottom half ===
==== Section 3 ====
First Round
(Hong Kong) Chan Y L (Hong Kong) Tse Y S	21	21
(Indonesia) I Fadhilah (Indonesia) S Wulansari	18	11
(Malaysia) Chan K B (Indonesia) M Wiranto	21	17
(Hong Kong) F Kurniawan (Hong Kong) Shek H Y	23	21
(Singapore) T Yeo (Singapore) S M Sari	24	21
(Malaysia) V I Mawan (Malaysia) S Saniru	22	13
BYE
4	(Malaysia) Tan A Q (Malaysia) Lai P J

Second Round
(Hong Kong) Chan Y L (Hong Kong) Tse YS	21	21
(Hong Kong) F Kurniawan (Hong Kong) Shek H Y	14	14
(Singapore) T Yeo (Singapore) S M Sari	21	13	14
4	(Malaysia) Tan A Q (Malaysia) Lai P J	18	21	21

Quarterfinals
(Hong Kong) Chan Y L (Hong Kong) Tse Y S	27	16	18
4	(Malaysia) Tan A Q (Malaysia) Lai P J	25	21	21

==== Section 4 ====
First Round
(China) Chen ZF (China) Huan YQ	14	21	28
(Indonesia) M F Gideon (Indonesia) A Variella	21	19	30
BYE
(Singapore) C Triyachart (Thailand) P Munkitamorn
(Indonesia) L A Nugroho (Indonesia) A Saufika	21	15	21
(Singapore) Liu Y (Singapore) Yao L	18	21	19
BYE
2	(Indonesia) M Kido (Indonesia) P Z Bernadeth

Second Round
(Indonesia) M F Gideon (Indonesia) A Variella	22	16	21
(Singapore) C Triyachart (Thailand) P Munkitamorn	20	21	17
(Indonesia) L A Nugroho (Indonesia) A Saufika	21	24
2	(Indonesia) M Kido (Indonesia) P Z Bernadeth	19	22

Quarterfinals
(Indonesia) M F Gideon (Indonesia) A Variella	21	23	21
(Indonesia) L A Nugroho (Indonesia) A Saufika	19	25	15

Preceded by 2013 New Zealand Open Grand Prix	BWF Grand Prix Gold and Grand Prix; 2013 season	Succeeded by 2013 Thailand Open Grand Prix Gold
