= 2012 Thailand Open Grand Prix Gold =

Tournament details
- Dates: June 5, 2012 - June 10, 2012
- Total prize money: US$120,000
- Venue: Nimibutr Stadium
- Location: Bangkok, Thailand

Champions
- Men's singles: (Indonesia) Sony Dwi Kuncoro
- Women's singles: (India) Saina Nehwal
- Men's doubles: (China) Liu Xiaolong (China) Qiu Zihan
- Women's doubles: (Thailand) Narissapat Lam (Thailand) Saralee Thungthongkam
- Mixed doubles: (China) Tao Jiaming (China) Tang Jinhua

The 2012 Thailand Open Grand Prix Gold was the fifth grand prix gold and grand prix tournament of the 2012 BWF Grand Prix Gold and Grand Prix. The tournament was held in Nimibutr Stadium, Bangkok, Thailand June 5 until June 10, 2012, and had a total purse of $120,000.

== Men's singles ==
=== Seeds ===
1. (China) Lin Dan (semi-final)
2. (Indonesia) Tommy Sugiarto (withdrew)
3. (Spain) Pablo Abian (first round)
4. (Malaysia) Muhd Hafiz Hashim (withdrew)
5. (Thailand) Boonsak Ponsana (third round)
6. (Guatemala) Kevin Cordon (first round)
7. (Indonesia) Alamsyah Yunus (third round)
8. (Malaysia) Chong Wei Feng (second round)
9. (France) Brice Leverdez (second round)
10. (Japan) Takuma Ueda (first round)
11. (Thailand) Tanongsak Saensomboonsuk (first round)
12. (India) Sourabh Varma (quarter-final)
13. (Ukraine) Dmytro Zavadsky (first round)
14. (India) Rajah Menuri Venkata Gurusaidutt (first round)
15. (Thailand) Suppanyu Avihingsanon (third round)
16. (Malaysia) Mohd Arif Abdul Latif (third round)

=== Finals ===
Quarterfinals
1	(China) Lin Dan	22	21
(Chinese Taipei) Shih Kuei-Chun	20	17
(Indonesia) Sony Dwi Kuncoro	21	21
12	(India) Sourabh Varma	6	8
(India) Sai Praneeth	15	17
(China) Chen Yuekun	21	21
Q2	(China) Gao Huan	21	21
(India) Sameer Verma	16	13

Semifinals
1	(China) Lin Dan	17	16
(Indonesia) Sony Dwi Kuncoro	21	21
(China) Chen Yuekun	21	21
Q2	(China) Gao Huan	14	15

Final
(Indonesia) Sony Dwi Kuncoro	21	21
(China) Chen Yuekun	17	14

=== Top half ===
==== Section 1 ====
First Round
1	(China) Lin D	19	21	21
Q8	(South Korea) Ha Y-W	21	8	15
(India) S Kidambi	14	21	21
PFQ	(Norway) M Myhre	21	12	7
15	(Thailand) S Avihingsanon	21	21
(Indonesia) A Dharma	17	16
(Malaysia) Loh WS	21	22
Q6	(Thailand) S Viboonsin	17	20

Second Round
1	(China) Lin D	21	21
(India) S Kidambi	11	13
15	(Thailand) S Avihingsanon	21	21
(Malaysia) Loh WS	17	11

Third Round
1	(China) Lin D	21	19	21
15	(Thailand) S Avihingsanon	11	21	10

==== Section 2 ====
First Round
5	(Thailand) B Ponsana	21	21
Q7	(Hong Kong) Ng KL	7	12
(South Korea) Lee D-K	11	21	19
(Thailand) T Sitthikom	21	19	21
13	(Ukraine) D Zavadsky	25	15	11
(Chinese Taipei) Shih K-C	23	21	21
(China) Tian HW	14	21	17
(Japan) R Takeshita	21	6	21

Second Round
5	(Thailand) B Ponsana	21	21
(Thailand) T Sitthikom	14	13
(Chinese Taipei) Shih K-C	13	21	21
(Japan) R Takeshita	21	18	15

Third Round
5	(Thailand) B Ponsana	18	19
(Chinese Taipei) Shih K-C	21	21

==== Section 3 ====
First Round
PFQ	(Indonesia) A Marteen	10	13
(Indonesia) S Kuncoro	21	21
(Malaysia) Kuan BH	21	21
Q5	(Thailand) W Tankmanustong	18	14
16	(Malaysia) A Abdul Latif	21	21
(South Korea) Park S-M	17	18
(Japan) S Wada	18	21	21
(Malaysia) Soong JV	21	10	14

Second Round
(Indonesia) S Kuncoro	23	14	21
(Malaysia) Kuan BH	21	21	17
16	(Malaysia) A Abdul Latif	21	21
(Japan) S Wada	15	14

Third Round
(Indonesia) S Kuncoro	20	21	21
16	(Malaysia) A Abdul Latif	22	19	15

==== Section 4 ====
First Round
7	(Indonesia) A Yunus	21	21
(Singapore) R Gonansa	18	11
(Indonesia) S Rhustavito	21	21
(China) Qiao B	15	9
12	(India) S Varma	21	21
(Indonesia) E Sukamta	11	12
(Thailand) P Vilailak	21	21
(United States) S Pongnairat	14	14

Second Round
7	(Indonesia) A Yunus	21	21
(Indonesia) S Rhustavito	13	15
12	(India) S Varma	15	21	21
(Thailand) P Vilailak	21	17	15

Third Round
7	(Indonesia) A Yunus	21	13	20
12	(India) S Varma	18	21	22

=== Bottom half ===
==== Section 5 ====
First Round
(India) S Praneeth	15	25	21
(Indonesia) W Prasetyo	21	23	17
(India) A Pawar	21	18	19
9	(France) B Leverdez	15	21	21
(Malaysia) Wong CH	21	21
Q4	(Indonesia) A Pratama	7	16
(Malaysia) B Wong	21	7	21
6	(Guatemala) K Cordon	18	21	18

Second Round
(India) S Praneeth	21	21
9	(France) B Leverdez	13	15
(Malaysia) Wong CH	21	21
(Malaysia) B Wong	19	15

Third Round
(India) S Praneeth	13	21	22
(Malaysia) Wong CH	21	18	20

==== Section 6 ====
First Round
(England) A Smith	24	21
(Malaysia) I Zainuddin	22	16
(Malaysia) Goh SH	18	21	21
14	(India) R Gurusaidutt	21	14	13
(South Korea) Hong J-H	19	12
(China) Chen YK	21	21
(Malaysia) R Misbun	21	21
3	(Spain) P Abian	14	18

Second Round
(England) A Smith	15	8
(Malaysia) Goh SH	21	21
(China) Chen YK	21	21
(Malaysia) R Misbun	13	11

Third Round
(Malaysia) Goh SH	19	21	10
(China) Chen YK	21	16	21

==== Section 7 ====
First Round
(Thailand) K Phetpradab	21	21
Q1	(Thailand) P Thongnuam	14	9
Q2	(China) Gao H	21	21
10	(Japan) T Ueda	13	18
(Hong Kong) Nan W	21	21
(Indonesia) R Subagja	19	9
(Thailand) P Poodchalat	7^{r}
8	(Malaysia) Chong WF	11

Second Round
(Thailand) K Phetpradab	14	21	14
Q2	(China) Gao H	21	14	21
(Hong Kong) Nan W	21	21
8	(Malaysia) Chong WF	15	18

Third Round
Q2	(China) Gao H	21	21
(Hong Kong) Nan W	19	19

==== Section 8 ====
First Round
(Malaysia) Chiang JS	22	21
(Singapore) Huang C	20	16
(India) S Verma	21	22
11	(Thailand) T Saensomboonsuk	10	20
Q3	(South Korea) Lee H-J	21	21
(Malaysia) Chan KB	18	19
(Czech Republic) J Frohlich	18	13
PFQ	(Malaysia) Soo TZ	21	21

Second Round
(Malaysia) Chiang JS	12	17
(India) S Verma	21	21
Q3	(South Korea) Lee H-J	19	21	20
PFQ	(Malaysia) Soo TZ	21	16	22

Third Round
(India) S Verma	21	21
PFQ	(Malaysia) Soo TZ	18	18

== Women's singles ==
=== Seeds ===
1. (India) Saina Nehwal (champion)
2. (Thailand) Ratchanok Inthanon (final)
3. (Thailand) Porntip Buranaprasertsuk (semi-final)
4. (India) Pusarla Venkata Sindhu (second round)
5. (Spain) Carolina Marín (first round)
6. (Hong Kong) Chan Tsz Ka (first round)
7. (Japan) Minatsu Mitani (quarter-final)
8. (Thailand) Sapsiree Taerattanachai (quarter-final)

=== Finals ===
Semifinals
1	(India) Saina Nehwal	24	21
3	(Thailand) Porntip Buranaprasertsuk	22	11
(China) Wang Lin	13	19
2	(Thailand) Ratchanok Inthanon	21	21

Final
1	(India) Saina Nehwal	19	21	21
2	(Thailand) Ratchanok Inthanon	21	15	10

=== Top half ===
==== Section 1 ====
First Round
1	(India) S Nehwal	21	16	21
(Thailand) N Jindapon	13	21	15
(China) Han L	21	21
(Indonesia) H Desi	18	15
8	(Thailand) S Taerattanachai	21	23
Q2	(Thailand) S Suwannakitborihan	13	21
(Malaysia) S Cheah	14	7
(Japan) K Imabeppu	21	21

Second Round
1	(India) S Nehwal	21	21
(China) Han L	17	13
8	(Thailand) S Taerattanachai	20	21	21
(Japan) K Imabeppu	22	19	15

Quarterfinals
1	(India) S Nehwal	21	22
8	(Thailand) S Taerattanachai	10	20

==== Section 2 ====
First Round
3	(Thailand) P Buranaprasertsuk	21	21
(Hong Kong) Cheung NY	12	17
(South Korea) Kim S-J	16	21	11
(Malaysia) L Cheah	21	17	21
6	(Hong Kong) Chan TK	7	12
(Japan) N Okuhara	21	21
(Singapore) Chen JY	13	10
(Thailand) S Ponsana	21	21

Second Round
3	(Thailand) P Buranaprasertsuk	21	22
(Malaysia) L Cheah	18	20
(Japan) N Okuhara	21	21
(Thailand) S Ponsana	11	15

Quarterfinals
3	(Thailand) P Buranaprasertsuk	13	21	21
(Japan) N Okuhara	21	17	17

=== Bottom half ===
==== Section 3 ====
First Round
(Thailand) B Ongbumrungpan	21	21
(Malaysia) S Saniru	16	16
Q4	(China) Sun Y	23	21	22
5	(Spain) C Marín	25	17	20
(Indonesia) B Manuputty	12	14
(China) Wang L	21	21
PFQ	(South Korea) Jung M-J	9	21	14
4	(India) P Sindhu	21	15	21

Second Round
(Thailand) B Ongbumrungpan	12	19
Q4	(China) Sun Y	21	21
(China) Wang L	21	25
4	(India) P Sindhu	12	23

Quarterfinals
Q4	(China) Sun Y	21	13	12
(China) Wang L	18	21	21

==== Section 4 ====
First Round
Q3	(South Korea) Park S-Y	21	21
(Malaysia) Yang LL	14	8
(Malaysia) Tee JY	15	11
7	(Japan) M Mitani	21	21
(China) Yao X	21	21
(Hong Kong) Mong KY	18	19
Q1	(Malaysia) Lim YF	5	14
2	(Thailand) R Inthanon	21	21

Second Round
Q3	(South Korea) Park S-Y	22	14
7	(Japan) M Mitani	24	21
(China) Yao X	18	22
2	(Thailand) R Inthanon	21	24

Quarterfinals
7	(Japan) M Mitani	14	19
2	(Thailand) R Inthanon	21	21

== Men's doubles ==
=== Seeds ===
1. (China) Liu Xiaolong / Qiu Zihan (champion)
2. (Thailand) Bodin Issara / Maneepong Jongjit (first round)
3. (South Korea) Kim Ki-Jung / Kim Sa-Rang (semi-final)
4. (Indonesia) Markus Fernaldi Gideon / Agripinna Prima Rahmanto Putra (first round)
5. (Japan) Yoshiteru Hirobe / Kenta Kazuno (quarter-final)
6. (Indonesia) Ricky Karanda Suwardi / Muhammad Ulinnuha (quarter-final)
7. (Malaysia) Mohd Lutfi Zaim Abdul Khalid / Vountus Indra Mawan (second round)
8. (Malaysia) Mohd Zakry Abdul Latif / Mohd Fairuzizuan Mohd Tazari (final)

=== Finals ===
Semifinals
1	(China) Liu Xiaolong (China) Qiu Zihan	25	21
3	(South Korea) Kim Ki-Jung (South Korea) Kim Sa-Rang	23	15
(Malaysia) Hoon Thien How (Malaysia) Tan Wee Kiong	20	15
8	(Malaysia) Mohd Zakry Abdul Latif (Malaysia) Mohd Fairuzizuan Mohd Tazari	22	21

Final
1	(China) Liu Xiaolong (China) Qiu Zihan	21	21
8	(Malaysia) Mohd Zakry Abdul Latif (Malaysia) Mohd Fairuzizuan Mohd Tazari	18	19

=== Top half ===
==== Section 1 ====
First Round
1	(China) Liu XL (China) Qiu ZH	21	20	21
(Thailand) T Lapoe (Thailand) S Prapakamol	12	22	7
(Chinese Taipei) Chang K-L (Chinese Taipei) Lu C-Y	22	16
(Malaysia) Gan TC (Malaysia) Ong SH	24	21
7	(Malaysia) L Abdul Khalid (Malaysia) V Mawan	21	19	22
(Indonesia) A Adistia (Indonesia) C Rusdianto	16	21	20
(Indonesia) R Adianto (Indonesia) B Angriawan	21	19	21
(Thailand) P Chalardchaleam (Thailand) N Puangpuapech	12	21	16

Second Round
1	(China) Liu XL (China) Qiu ZH	21	21
(Malaysia) Gan TC (Malaysia) Ong SH	16	15
7	(Malaysia) L Abdul Khalid (Malaysia) V Mawan	21	18	20
(Indonesia) R Adianto (Indonesia) B Angriawan	13	21	22

Quarterfinals
1	(China) Liu XL (China) Qiu ZH	21	16	21
(Indonesia) R Adianto (Indonesia) B Angriawan	17	21	13

==== Section 2 ====
First Round
3	(South Korea) Kim K-J (South Korea) Kim S-R	21	21
(Malaysia) J Singh (Malaysia) Yew HK	15	10
(Malaysia) Mak HC (Malaysia) Teo KS	21	21
(Hong Kong) Chan YL (Hong Kong) Leung CY	13	13
6	(Indonesia) R Suwardi (Indonesia) M Ulinnuha	24	21
(India) T Kona (India) A Vishnu	22	13
(Singapore) T Yeo (Singapore) Liu Y	21	18	17
(Malaysia) Chooi KM (Malaysia) Ow YH	13	21	21

Second Round
3	(South Korea) Kim K-J (South Korea) Kim S-R	21	21
(Malaysia) Mak HC (Malaysia) Teo KS	19	14
6	(Indonesia) R Suwardi (Indonesia) M Ulinnuha	21	21
(Malaysia) Chooi KM (Malaysia) Ow YH	16	16

Quarterfinals
3	(South Korea) Kim K-J (South Korea) Kim S-R	21	21
6	(Indonesia) R Suwardi (Indonesia) M Ulinnuha	19	8

=== Bottom half ===
==== Section 3 ====
First Round
(Scotland) R Blair (Malaysia) Tan BS	21	21
Q3	(South Korea) Han T-S (South Korea) Kim D-E	10	16
(Hong Kong) Lee CH (Hong Kong) Ng KL	14	16
5	(Japan) Y Hirobe (Japan) K Kazuno	21	21
(Malaysia) N Heg (Malaysia) Teo EY	15	21	22
(Chinese Taipei) Huang P-J (Chinese Taipei) Liao M-C	21	19	24
(Malaysia) Hoon TH (Malaysia) Tan WK	21	22
4	(Indonesia) M Gideon (Indonesia) A Putra	19	20

Second Round
(Scotland) R Blair (Malaysia) Tan BS	15	22	9
5	(Japan) Y Hirobe (Japan) K Kazuno	21	20	21
(Chinese Taipei) Huang P-J (Chinese Taipei) Liao M-C	20	16
(Malaysia) Hoon TH (Malaysia) Tan WK	22	21

Quarterfinals
5	(Japan) Y Hirobe (Japan) K Kazuno	18	15
(Malaysia) Hoon TH (Malaysia) Tan WK	21	21

==== Section 4 ====
First Round
(Indonesia) H Faisal (Indonesia) P Rhoma	17	24	20
(Malaysia) Low JS (Malaysia) Tan YJ	21	22	22
Q2	(South Korea) Ha Y-W (South Korea) Lee H-J	8	18
8	(Malaysia) Z Abdul Latif (Malaysia) F Tazari	21	21
Q4	(Malaysia) C Ong (Malaysia) Tan WG	21	21
(India) Sanjeeth S. (India) J Yadav	12	6
Q1	(South Korea) Kang J-W (South Korea) Lee S-J	5
2	(Thailand) B Issara (Thailand) M Jongjit	4^{r}

Second Round
(Malaysia) Low JS (Malaysia) Tan YJ	14	21	23
8	(Malaysia) Z Abdul Latif (Malaysia) F Tazari	21	12	25
Q4	(Malaysia) C Ong (Malaysia) Tan WG	22	21	12
Q1	(South Korea) Kang J-W (South Korea) Lee S-J	24	13	21

Quarterfinals
8	(Malaysia) Z Abdul Latif (Malaysia) F Tazari	21	21
Q1	(South Korea) Kang J-W (South Korea) Lee S-J	18	14

== Women's doubles ==
=== Seeds ===
1. (China) Xia Huan / Tang Jinhua (semi-final)
2. (Singapore) Shinta Mulia Sari / Yao Lei (second round)
3. (Indonesia) Vita Marissa / Nadya Melati (quarter-final)
4. (Malaysia) Chin Eei Hui / Wong Pei Tty (second round)
5. (China) Cheng Shu / Pan Pan (final)
6. (Thailand) Duanganong Aroonkesorn / Kunchala Voravichitchaikul (semi-final)
7. (Japan) Rie Eto / Yu Wakita (quarter-final)
8. (Indonesia) Suci Rizki Andini / Della Destiara Haris (quarter-final)

=== Finals ===
Semifinals
1	(China) Xia Huan (China) Tang Jinhua	15	20
(Thailand) Lam Narissapat (Thailand) Saralee Thoungthongkam	21	22
5	(China) Cheng Shu (China) Pan Pan	21	21
6	(Thailand) Duanganong Aroonkesorn (Thailand) Kunchala Voravichitchaikul	15	17

Final
(Thailand) Lam Narissapat (Thailand) Saralee Thoungthongkam	21	10	21
5	(China) Cheng Shu (China) Pan Pan	15	21	13

=== Top half ===
==== Section 1 ====
First Round
1	(China) Xia H (China) Tang JH	21	21
(India) A Balan (India) S Reddy	10	13
(South Korea) Choi H-I (South Korea) Kim S-Y	20	21	21
(Thailand) S Amitrapai (Thailand) S Taerattanachai	22	15	9
8	(Indonesia) S Andini (Indonesia) D Haris	21	21
(Thailand) P Arkornsakul (Thailand) J Kittiharakul	15	15
(South Korea) Kim C-M (South Korea) Ko A-R	21	21
(Singapore) V Neo (Singapore) Thng TT	3	18

Second Round
1	(China) Xia H (China) Tang JH	21	21
(South Korea) Choi H-I (South Korea) Kim S-Y	14	16
8	(Indonesia) S Andini (Indonesia) D Haris	21	21
(South Korea) Kim C-M (South Korea) Ko A-R	16	19

Quarterfinals
1	(China) Xia H (China) Tang JH	22	21
8	(Indonesia) S Andini (Indonesia) D Haris	20	10

==== Section 2 ====
First Round
4	(Malaysia) Chin EH (Malaysia) Wong PT	21	21
Q1	(Thailand) V Iamratanamaetheekul (Thailand) S Chaithongwongwatana	10	5
(Thailand) L Narissapat (Thailand) S Thoungthongkam	21	15	21
(Indonesia) P Zebadiah (Indonesia) R Pradipta	17	21	16
7	(Japan) R Eto (Japan) Y Wakita	22	21
(Hong Kong) Chan HY (Hong Kong) Chau HW	20	12
(Chinese Taipei) Chen H-H (Chinese Taipei) Lai C-W	21	21
(Thailand) R Chuthabunditkul (Thailand) C Julrattanamanee	13	18

Second Round
4	(Malaysia) Chin EH (Malaysia) Wong PT	15	13
(Thailand) L Narissapat (Thailand) S Thoungthongkam	21	21
7	(Japan) R Eto (Japan) Y Wakita	21	21
(Chinese Taipei) Chen H-H (Chinese Taipei) Lai C-W	17	16

Quarterfinals
(Thailand) L Narissapat (Thailand) S Thoungthongkam	21	18	21
7	(Japan) R Eto (Japan) Y Wakita	19	21	17

=== Bottom half ===
==== Section 3 ====
First Round
Q2	(Japan) A Tasaki (Japan) S Yamada	21	21
(Thailand) P Krajangjit (Thailand) W Ruangthananruk	12	14
Q4	(Thailand) P Muenwong (Thailand) S Naruepunnard	9	16
5	(China) Cheng S (China) Pan P	21	21
(India) P Gadre (India) P Sawant	19	12
(Malaysia) A Anscelly (Malaysia) Soong FC	21	21
(Thailand) W Hongchookeat (Thailand) P Supajirakul	13	11
3	(Indonesia) V Marissa (Indonesia) N Melati	21	21

Second Round
Q2	(Japan) A Tasaki (Japan) S Yamada	13	12
5	(China) Cheng S (China) Pan P	21	21
(Malaysia) A Anscelly (Malaysia) Soong FC	15	17
3	(Indonesia) V Marissa (Indonesia) N Melati	21	21

Quarterfinals
5	(China) Cheng S (China) Pan P	24	15	21
3	(Indonesia) V Marissa (Indonesia) N Melati	22	21	9

==== Section 4 ====
First Round
PFQ	(Malaysia) Lai PJ (Malaysia) M Ng	21	21
(Thailand) S Ekmongkolpaisarn (Thailand) P Munkitamorn	14	14
(Indonesia) K Dewi (Indonesia) J Gozali	16	17
6	(Thailand) D Aroonkesorn (Thailand) K Voravichitchaikul	21	21
(South Korea) Lee S-H (South Korea) Shin S-C	21	19	20
(Indonesia) G Imawan (Indonesia) T Nuraidah	16	21	22
Q3	(Thailand) A Serithammarak (Thailand) C Chaladchalam	14	12
2	(Singapore) S Sari (Singapore) Yao L	21	21

Second Round
PFQ	(Malaysia) Lai PJ (Malaysia) M Ng	18	16
6	(Thailand) D Aroonkesorn (Thailand) K Voravichitchaikul	21	21
(Indonesia) G Imawan (Indonesia) T Nuraidah	21	16	21
2	(Singapore) S Sari (Singapore) Yao L	16	21	19

Quarterfinals
6	(Thailand) D Aroonkesorn (Thailand) K Voravichitchaikul	21	24
(Indonesia) G Imawan (Indonesia) T Nuraidah	18	22

== Mixed doubles ==
=== Seeds ===
1. (Denmark) Joachim Fischer Nielsen / Christinna Pedersen (semi-final)
2. (Thailand) Sudket Prapakamol / Saralee Thoungthongkam (final)
3. (Thailand) Maneepong Jongjit / Savitree Amitrapai (first round)
4. (Singapore) Danny Bawa Chrisnanta / Vanessa Neo Yu Yan (semi-final)
5. (Thailand) Songphon Anugritayawon / Kunchala Voravichitchaikul (first round)
6. (Hong Kong) Wong Wai Hong / Chau Hoi Wah (second round)
7. (Indonesia) Irfan Fadhilah / Weni Anggraini (quarter-final)
8. (Indonesia) Riky Widianto / Richi Puspita Dili (first round)

=== Finals ===
Semifinals
1	(Denmark) Joachim Fischer Nielsen (Denmark) Christinna Pedersen	16	17
(China) Tao Jiaming (China) Tang Jinhua	21	21
4	(Singapore) Danny Bawa Chrisnanta (Singapore) Vanessa Neo Yu Yan	13	20
2	(Thailand) Sudket Prapakamol (Thailand) Saralee Thoungthongkam	21	22

Final
(China) Tao Jiaming (China) Tang Jinhua	21	21
2	(Thailand) Sudket Prapakamol (Thailand) Saralee Thoungthongkam	14	16

=== Top half ===
==== Section 1 ====
First Round
1	(Denmark) J Nielsen (Denmark) C Pedersen	21	22
(South Korea) Kim K-J (South Korea) Kim S-Y	15	20
(South Korea) Kang J-W (South Korea) Lee S-H	17	15
Q3	(Indonesia) L Nugroho (Indonesia) A Saufika	21	21
5	(Thailand) S Anugritayawon (Thailand) K Voravichitchaikul	21	10	19
(Singapore) T Yeo (Singapore) D Yuliana	17	21	21
(India) A Vishnu (India) A Balan	14	13
(Malaysia) Ong JG (Malaysia) Lim YL	21	21

Second Round
1	(Denmark) J Nielsen (Denmark) C Pedersen	21	21
Q3	(Indonesia) L Nugroho (Indonesia) A Saufika	6	14
(Singapore) T Yeo (Singapore) D Yuliana	17	21	18
(Malaysia) Ong JG (Malaysia) Lim YL	21	10	21

Quarterfinals
1	(Denmark) J Nielsen (Denmark) C Pedersen	21	21
(Malaysia) Ong JG (Malaysia) Lim YL	17	18

==== Section 2 ====
First Round
3	(Thailand) M Jongjit (Thailand) S Amitrapai	12	21	16
(Indonesia) F Kurniawan (Indonesia) S Irawati	21	11	21
(Thailand) T Lapoe (Thailand) P Munkitamorn	21	8	21
(South Korea) Lee S-J (South Korea) Shin S-C	18	21	8
8	(Indonesia) R Widianto (Indonesia) R Dili	21	12	19
(China) Tao JM (China) Tang JH	16	21	21
(Indonesia) A Prasetya (Indonesia) G Widjaja	21	18	16
(Chinese Taipei) Liao M-C (Chinese Taipei) Chen H-H	14	21	21

Second Round
(Indonesia) F Kurniawan (Indonesia) S Irawati	21	21
(Thailand) T Lapoe (Thailand) P Munkitamorn	16	15
(China) Tao JM (China) Tang JH	21	21
(Chinese Taipei) Liao M-C (Chinese Taipei) Chen H-H	18	10

Quarterfinals
(Indonesia) F Kurniawan (Indonesia) S Irawati	11	12
(China) Tao JM (China) Tang JH	21	21

=== Bottom half ===
==== Section 3 ====
First Round
(South Korea) Kim S-R (South Korea) Choi H-I	21	21
Q4	(Hong Kong) Lee CH (Hong Kong) Mong KY	8	11
Q1	(South Korea) Kim D-E (South Korea) Ko A-R	21	17	15
7	(Indonesia) I Fadhilah (Indonesia) W Anggraini	18	21	21
(Indonesia) T Kusharjanto (Indonesia) V Marissa	21	19	21
(Malaysia) Tan AQ (Malaysia) Lai PJ	18	21	12
(Indonesia) P Rhoma (Indonesia) R Pradipta	16	11
4	(Singapore) D Chrisnanta (Singapore) V Neo	21	21

Second Round
(South Korea) Kim S-R (South Korea) Choi H-I	22	15	18
7	(Indonesia) I Fadhilah (Indonesia) W Anggraini	20	21	21
(Indonesia) T Kusharjanto (Indonesia) V Marissa	18	17
4	(Singapore) D Chrisnanta (Singapore) V Neo	21	21

Quarterfinals
7	(Indonesia) I Fadhilah (Indonesia) W Anggraini	11	15
4	(Singapore) D Chrisnanta (Singapore) V Neo	21	21

==== Section 4 ====
First Round
(Chinese Taipei) Huang P-J (Chinese Taipei) Lai C-W	21	8	21
(Malaysia) R Abdul Latif (Malaysia) A Anscelly	14	21	17
(Singapore) Liu Y (Singapore) Thng TT	19	19
6	(Hong Kong) Wong WH (Hong Kong) Chau HW	21	21
(Malaysia) B Wong (Malaysia) Soong FC	16	23	15
Q2	(Indonesia) A Pratama (Indonesia) N Melati	21	21	21
(Indonesia) H Faisal (Indonesia) P Zebadiah	21	15	16
2	(Thailand) S Prapakamol (Thailand) S Thoungthongkam	14	21	21

Second Round
(Chinese Taipei) Huang P-J (Chinese Taipei) Lai C-W	21	19	21
6	(Hong Kong) Wong WH (Hong Kong) Chau HW	14	21	14
Q2	(Indonesia) A Pratama (Indonesia) N Melati	8	23
2	(Thailand) S Prapakamol (Thailand) S Thoungthongkam	21	25

Quarterfinals
(Chinese Taipei) Huang P-J (Chinese Taipei) Lai C-W	14	18
2	(Thailand) S Prapakamol (Thailand) S Thoungthongkam	21	21

Preceded by 2012 Malaysia Open Grand Prix Gold	BWF Grand Prix Gold and Grand Prix; 2012 season	Succeeded by 2012 Russia Open Grand Prix
