= 2012 BWF Grand Prix Gold and Grand Prix =

Badminton championships

The 2012 BWF Grand Prix Gold and Grand Prix was the sixth season of BWF Grand Prix Gold and Grand Prix.

== Schedule ==
Below is the schedule released by Badminton World Federation:

Tour	Official title	Venue	City	Date		Prize money USD	Report
Tour	Official title	Venue	City	Start	Finish	Prize money USD	Report
1	(Germany) German Open Grand Prix Gold	RWE-Sporthalle	Mülheim	February 28	March 4	125,000	Report
2	(Switzerland) Swiss Open Grand Prix Gold	St. Jakobshalle	Basel	March 13	March 18	125,000	Report
3	(Australia) Australian Open Grand Prix Gold	Sydney Convention and Exhibition Centre	Sydney	April 3	April 8	120,000	Report
4	Malaysia Open Grand Prix Gold	Stadium Bandaraya	Johor Bahru	May 1	May 6	120,000	Report
5	Thailand Open Grand Prix Gold	CU Sport Complex	Bangkok	June 5	June 10	120,000	Report
6	Russia Open Grand Prix	Sports Hall Olympic	Vladivostok	June 26	July 1	50,000	Report
7	(United States) U.S. Open Grand Prix Gold	Orange County Badminton Club	Orange	July 2	July 7	120,000	Report
8	Canada Open Grand Prix	Richmond Olympic Oval	Richmond	July 10	July 15	50,000	Report
9	Vietnam Open Grand Prix	Phan Dinh Phung Stadium	Ho Chi Minh City	August 21	August 26	50,000	Report
10	Indonesia Open Grand Prix Gold	Palembang Sport and Convention Center	Palembang	September 25	September 30	120,000	Report
11	Chinese Taipei Open Grand Prix Gold	Hsing Chuang Gymnasium	Taipei	October 2	October 7	200,000	Report
12	(Netherlands) Dutch Open Grand Prix	Topsportcentrum	Almere	October 9	October 14	50,000	Report
13	(Germany) Bitburger Open Grand Prix Gold	Saarlandhalle	Saarbrücken	October 30	November 4	120,000	Report
14	Macau Open Grand Prix Gold	Macau Forum	Macau	November 27	December 2	120,000	Report
15	(South Korea) Korea Open Grand Prix Gold	Lee Yongdae Gymnasium	Hwasun	December 4	December 9	120,000	Report
16	India Open Grand Prix Gold	Babu Banarasi Das Indoor Stadium	Lucknow	December 18	December 23	120,000	Report

Grand Prix Gold

== Results ==
=== Winners ===
Tour	Men's singles	Women's singles	Men's doubles	Women's doubles	Mixed doubles
Germany	(China) Lin Dan	(China) Li Xuerui	(China) Hong Wei (China) Shen Ye	(China) Xia Huan (China) Tang Jinhua	(Denmark) Thomas Laybourn (Denmark) Kamilla Rytter Juhl
Switzerland	(China) Chen Jin	(India) Saina Nehwal	(Japan) Naoki Kawamae (Japan) Shōji Satō	(China) Xia Huan (China) Tang Jinhua	(Indonesia) Tontowi Ahmad (Indonesia) Liliyana Natsir
Australia	(China) Chen Jin	(China) Han Li	(Indonesia) Markis Kido (Indonesia) Hendra Setiawan	(China) Luo Ying (China) Luo Yu	(Chinese Taipei) Chen Hung-ling (Chinese Taipei) Cheng Wen-hsing
Malaysia	(Malaysia) Lee Chong Wei	(Thailand) Busanan Ongbamrungphan	(Malaysia) Koo Kien Keat (Malaysia) Tan Boon Heong	(Malaysia) Chin Eei Hui (Malaysia) Wong Pei Tty	(Malaysia) Chan Peng Soon (Malaysia) Goh Liu Ying
Thailand	(Indonesia) Sony Dwi Kuncoro	(India) Saina Nehwal	(China) Liu Xiaolong (China) Qiu Zihan	(Thailand) Narissapat Lam (Thailand) Saralee Thungthongkam	(China) Tao Jiaming (China) Tang Jinhua
Russia	(Japan) Kazumasa Sakai	(Japan) Yui Hashimoto	(Russia) Vladimir Ivanov (Russia) Ivan Sozonov	(Russia) Valeria Sorokina (Russia) Nina Vislova	(Russia) Aleksandr Nikolaenko (Russia) Valeria Sorokina
(United States) U.S.	(Russia) Vladimir Ivanov	(Chinese Taipei) Pai Hsiao-ma	(Japan) Hiroyuki Endo (Japan) Kenichi Hayakawa	(Japan) Misaki Matsutomo (Japan) Ayaka Takahashi	(United States) Tony Gunawan (Indonesia) Vita Marissa
Canada	(Chinese Taipei) Chou Tien-chen	(Japan) Nozomi Okuhara	(Japan) Takeshi Kamura (Japan) Keigo Sonoda	(Japan) Misaki Matsutomo (Japan) Ayaka Takahashi	(Japan) Ryota Taohata (Japan) Ayaka Takahashi
Vietnam	(Vietnam) Nguyễn Tiến Minh	(Thailand) Porntip Buranaprasertsuk	(Thailand) Bodin Isara (Thailand) Maneepong Jongjit	(Indonesia) Pia Zebadiah Bernadet (Indonesia) Rizki Amelia Pradipta	(Indonesia) Markis Kido (Indonesia) Pia Zebadiah Bernadet
Indonesia	(Indonesia) Sony Dwi Kuncoro	(China) Han Li	(South Korea) Kim Ki-jung (South Korea) Kim Sa-rang	(Japan) Misaki Matsutomo (Japan) Ayaka Takahashi	(Indonesia) Tontowi Ahmad (Indonesia) Liliyana Natsir
Chinese Taipei	(Vietnam) Nguyễn Tiến Minh	(Chinese Taipei) Tai Tzu-ying	(Malaysia) Mohd Zakry Abdul Latif (Malaysia) Mohd Fairuzizuan Mohd Tazari	(Indonesia) Pia Zebadiah Bernadet (Indonesia) Rizki Amelia Pradipta	(Indonesia) Muhammad Rizal (Indonesia) Debby Susanto
Netherlands	(Netherlands) Eric Pang	(Czech Republic) Kristína Gavnholt	(Indonesia) Markis Kido (Indonesia) Alvent Yulianto	(Netherlands) Selena Piek (Netherlands) Iris Tabeling	(Denmark) Mads Pieler Kolding (Denmark) Kamilla Rytter Juhl
(Germany) Bitburger	(Chinese Taipei) Chou Tien-chen	(Germany) Juliane Schenk	(Germany) Ingo Kindervater (Germany) Johannes Schöttler	(Macau) Wang Rong (Macau) Zhang Zhibo	(Denmark) Anders Kristiansen (Denmark) Julie Houmann
Macau	(China) Chen Yuekun	(China) Sun Yu	(Chinese Taipei) Lee Sheng-mu (Chinese Taipei) Tsai Chia-hsin	(South Korea) Eom Hye-won (South Korea) Jang Ye-na	(Indonesia) Tontowi Ahmad (Indonesia) Liliyana Natsir
(South Korea) Korea	(South Korea) Lee Dong-keun	(South Korea) Sung Ji-hyun	(South Korea) Ko Sung-hyun (South Korea) Lee Yong-dae	(South Korea) Eom Hye-won (South Korea) Jang Ye-na	(South Korea) Yoo Yeon-seong (South Korea) Jang Ye-na
India	(India) Kashyap Parupalli	(Indonesia) Lindaweni Fanetri	(South Korea) Ko Sung-hyun (South Korea) Lee Yong-dae	(Thailand) Savitree Amitrapai (Thailand) Sapsiree Taerattanachai	(Indonesia) Fran Kurniawan (Indonesia) Shendy Puspa Irawati

=== Performances by countries ===
Tabulated below are the Grand Prix performances based on countries. Only countries who have won a title are listed:

Team	GER	SUI	AUS	MAS	THA	RUS	USA	CAN	VIE	INA	TPE	NED	GER	MAC	KOR	IND	Total
China	4	2	3		2					1				2			14
Indonesia		1	1		1		0.5		2	2	2	1		1		2	13.5
Japan		1				2	2	4		1							10
South Korea										1				1	5	1	8
Chinese Taipei			1				1	1			1		1	1			6
Malaysia				4							1						5
Thailand				1	1				2							1	5
Russia						3	1										4
Denmark	1											1	1				3
India		1			1											1	3
Vietnam									1		1						2
Netherlands												2					2
Germany													2				2
Czech Republic												1					1
Macau													1				1
United States							0.5										0.5

== Grand Prix Gold ==
=== German Open ===
Category	Winners	Runners-up	Score
Men's singles	(China) Lin Dan	(Indonesia) Simon Santoso	21–11, 21–11
Women's singles	(China) Li Xuerui	(Germany) Juliane Schenk	21–19, 21–16
Men's doubles	(China) Hong Wei / Shen Ye	(South Korea) Jung Jae-sung / Lee Yong-dae	21–19, 18–21, 21–19
Women's doubles	(China) Xia Huan / Tang Jinhua	(South Korea) Jung Kyung-eun / Kim Ha-na	23–21, 21–13
Mixed doubles	(Denmark) Thomas Laybourn / Kamilla Rytter Juhl	(South Korea) Lee Yong-dae / Ha Jung-eun	21–9, 21–16

=== Swiss Open ===
Category	Winners	Runners-up	Score
Men's singles	(China) Chen Jin	(South Korea) Lee Hyun-il	14–21, 21–9, 21–17
Women's singles	(India) Saina Nehwal	(China) Wang Shixian	21–19, 21–16
Men's doubles	(Japan) Naoki Kawamae / Shōji Satō	(Chinese Taipei) Fang Chieh-min / Lee Sheng-mu	21–13, 21–14
Women's doubles	(China) Xia Huan / Tang Jinhua	(China) Bao Yixin / Zhong Qianxin	21–17, 21–10
Mixed doubles	(Indonesia) Tontowi Ahmad / Liliyana Natsir	(Thailand) Sudket Prapakamol / Saralee Thungthongkam	21–16, 21–14

=== Australian Open ===
Category	Winners	Runners-up	Score
Men's singles	(China) Chen Jin	(Vietnam) Nguyễn Tiến Minh	21–11, 21–12
Women's singles	(China) Han Li	(South Korea) Bae Youn-joo	21–13, 21–14
Men's doubles	(Indonesia) Markis Kido / Hendra Setiawan	(Chinese Taipei) Fang Chieh-min / Lee Sheng-mu	21–16, 21–15
Women's doubles	(China) Luo Ying / Luo Yu	(Chinese Taipei) Cheng Wen-hsing / Chien Yu-chin	12–21, 21–18, 21–17
Mixed doubles	(Chinese Taipei) Chen Hung-ling / Cheng Wen-hsing	(Malaysia) Chan Peng Soon / Goh Liu Ying	22–20, 12–21, 23–21

=== Malaysia Open ===
Category	Winners	Runners-up	Score
Men's singles	(Malaysia) Lee Chong Wei	(Indonesia) Sony Dwi Kuncoro	17–21, 21–8, 21–10
Women's singles	(Thailand) Busanan Ongbamrungphan	(Japan) Sayaka Takahashi	21–17, 22–20
Men's doubles	(Malaysia) Koo Kien Keat / Tan Boon Heong	(Malaysia) Chooi Kah Ming / Ow Yao Han	21–15, 21–19
Women's doubles	(Malaysia) Chin Eei Hui / Wong Pei Tty	(Singapore) Shinta Mulia Sari / Yao Lei	21–18, 21–18
Mixed doubles	(Malaysia) Chan Peng Soon / Goh Liu Ying	(Indonesia) Irfan Fadhilah / Weni Anggraini	21–12, 21–14

=== Thailand Open ===
Category	Winners	Runners-up	Score
Men's singles	(Indonesia) Sony Dwi Kuncoro	(China) Chen Yuekun	21–17, 21–14
Women's singles	(India) Saina Nehwal	(Thailand) Ratchanok Intanon	19–21, 21–15, 21–10
Men's doubles	(China) Liu Xiaolong / Qiu Zihan	(Malaysia) Mohd Zakry Abdul Latif / Mohd Fairuzizuan Mohd Tazari	21–18, 21–19
Women's doubles	(Thailand) Narissapat Lam / Saralee Thungthongkam	(China) Cheng Shu / Pan Pan	21–15, 10–21, 21–13
Mixed doubles	(China) Tao Jiaming / Tang Jinhua	(Thailand) Sudket Prapakamol / Saralee Thungthongkam	21–14, 21–16

=== U.S. Open ===
Category	Winners	Runners-up	Score
Men's singles	(Russia) Vladimir Ivanov	(Japan) Takuma Ueda	22–20, 21–17
Women's singles	(Chinese Taipei) Pai Hsiao-ma	(Japan) Kaori Imabeppu	21–17, 16–21, 21–11
Men's doubles	(Japan) Hiroyuki Endo / Kenichi Hayakawa	(Japan) Yoshiteru Hirobe / Kenta Kazuno	21–15, 21–10
Women's doubles	(Japan) Misaki Matsutomo / Ayaka Takahashi	(Russia) Valeria Sorokina / Nina Vislova	21–19, 21–17
Mixed doubles	(United States) Tony Gunawan / (Indonesia) Vita Marissa	(Japan) Kenichi Hayakawa / Misaki Matsutomo	21–13, 21–10

=== Indonesia Open ===
Category	Winners	Runners-up	Score
Men's singles	(Indonesia) Sony Dwi Kuncoro	(Indonesia) Dionysius Hayom Rumbaka	21–11, 21–11
Women's singles	(China) Han Li	(Indonesia) Yeni Asmarani	21–12, 21–10
Men's doubles	(South Korea) Kim Ki-jung / Kim Sa-rang	(Indonesia) Angga Pratama / Rian Agung Saputro	21–13, 21–9
Women's doubles	(Japan) Misaki Matsutomo / Ayaka Takahashi	(South Korea) Eom Hye-won / Jang Ye-na	21–12, 12–21, 21–13
Mixed doubles	(Indonesia) Tontowi Ahmad / Liliyana Natsir	(Indonesia) Muhammad Rijal / Debby Susanto	21–19, 21–14

=== Chinese Taipei Open ===
Category	Winners	Runners-up	Score
Men's singles	(Vietnam) Nguyễn Tiến Minh	(Chinese Taipei) Chou Tien-chen	21–11, 21–17
Women's singles	(Chinese Taipei) Tai Tzu-ying	(Indonesia) Lindaweni Fanetri	21–19, 20–22, 22–20
Men's doubles	(Malaysia) Mohd Zakry Abdul Latif / Mohd Fairuzizuan Mohd Tazari	(Indonesia) Angga Pratama / Rian Agung Saputro	21–12, 21–14
Women's doubles	(Indonesia) Pia Zebadiah Bernadet / Rizki Amelia Pradipta	(Indonesia) Suci Rizki Andini / Della Destiara Haris	21–15, 21–12
Mixed doubles	(Indonesia) Muhammad Rizal / Debby Susanto	(Hong Kong) Lee Chun Hei / Chau Hoi Wah	21–14, 21–14

=== Bitburger Open ===
Category	Winners	Runners-up	Score
Men's singles	(Chinese Taipei) Chou Tien-chen	(Germany) Marc Zwiebler	21–19, 21–12
Women's singles	(Germany) Juliane Schenk	(Netherlands) Yao Jie	21–10, 15-21, 25–23
Men's doubles	(Germany) Ingo Kindervater / Johannes Schöttler	(England) Chris Langridge / Peter Mills	21–15, 21–11
Women's doubles	(Macau) Wang Rong / Zhang Zhibo	(Germany) Johanna Goliszewski / Birgit Michels	21–15, 21–13
Mixed doubles	(Denmark) Anders Kristiansen / Julie Houmann	(Poland) Robert Mateusiak / Nadieżda Zięba	21–11, 21–16

=== Macau Open ===
Category	Winners	Runners-up	Score
Men's singles	(China) Chen Yuekun	(China) Gao Huan	21–9, 21–17
Women's singles	(China) Sun Yu	(Thailand) Busanan Ongbamrungphan	21–19, 21–8
Men's doubles	(Chinese Taipei) Lee Sheng-mu / Tsai Chia-hsin	(Russia) Vladimir Ivanov / Ivan Sozonov	14–21, 21–17, 21–16
Women's doubles	(South Korea) Eom Hye-won / Jang Ye-na	(South Korea) Choi Hye-in / Kim So-young	21–18, 21–16
Mixed doubles	(Indonesia) Tontowi Ahmad / Liliyana Natsir	(Indonesia) Muhammad Rizal / Debby Susanto	21–16, 14–21, 21–16

=== Korea Open ===
Category	Winners	Runners-up	Score
Men's singles	(South Korea) Lee Dong-keun	(Thailand) Tanongsak Saensomboonsuk	21–17, 21–14
Women's singles	(South Korea) Sung Ji-hyun	(Indonesia) Aprilia Yuswandari	21–10, 21–10
Men's doubles	(South Korea) Ko Sung-hyun / Lee Yong-dae	(South Korea) Kim Ki-jung / Kim Sa-rang	21–12, 21–11
Women's doubles	(South Korea) Eom Hye-won / Jang Ye-na	(South Korea) Lee So-hee / Shin Seung-chan	21–13, 21–17
Mixed doubles	(South Korea) Shin Baek-cheol / Eom Hye-won	(South Korea) Yoo Yeon-seong / Jang Ye-na	11–21, 21–18, 25–23

=== India Open ===
Category	Winners	Runners-up	Score
Men's singles	(India) Kashyap Parupalli	(Thailand) Tanongsak Saensomboonsuk	21–19, 14–21, 21–17
Women's singles	(Indonesia) Lindaweni Fanetri	(India) P. V. Sindhu	21–15, 18–21, 21–18
Men's doubles	(South Korea) Ko Sung-hyun / Lee Yong-dae	(South Korea) Kang Ji-wook / Lee Sang-joon	21–13, 21–19
Women's doubles	(Thailand) Savitree Amitrapai / Sapsiree Taerattanachai	(Indonesia) Komala Dewi / Jenna Gozali	21–12, 21–6
Mixed doubles	(Indonesia) Fran Kurniawan / Shendy Puspa Irawati	(Thailand) Nipitphon Phuangphuapet / Savitree Amitrapai	21–12, 24–22

== Grand Prix ==
=== Oceania Championships ===
Category	Winners	Runners-up	Score
Men's singles	(New Zealand) James Eunson	(New Zealand) Michael Fowke	21–19, 21–15
Women's singles	(New Zealand) Michelle Chan	(Australia) Verdet Kessler	21–10, 21–17
Men's doubles	(Australia) Ross Smith / Glenn Warfe	(New Zealand) Kevin Dennerly-Minturn / Oliver Leydon-Davis	21–17, 21–18
Women's doubles	(Australia) Leanne Choo / Renuga Veeran	(Australia) Ann-Louise Slee / Eugenia Tanaka	21–16, 21–13
Mixed doubles	(Australia) Raymond Tam / Eugenia Tanaka	(Australia) Glenn Warfe / Leanne Choo	21–17, 21–19

=== Russian Open ===
Category	Winners	Runners-up	Score
Men's singles	(Japan) Kazumasa Sakai	(Russia) Vladimir Malkov	21–17, 21–17
Women's singles	(Japan) Yui Hashimoto	(Japan) Shizuka Uchida	21–19, 21–12
Men's doubles	(Russia) Vladimir Ivanov / Ivan Sozonov	(Russia) Vitalij Durkin / Aleksandr Nikolaenko	21–18, 21–15
Women's doubles	(Russia) Valeria Sorokina / Nina Vislova	(Russia) Tatjana Bibik / Anastasia Chervaykova	Walkover
Mixed doubles	(Russia) Aleksandr Nikolaenko / Valeria Sorokina	(Russia) Vitalij Durkin / Nina Vislova	21–19, 21–17

=== Canada Open ===
Category	Winners	Runners-up	Score
Men's singles	(Chinese Taipei) Chou Tien-chen	(Chinese Taipei) Lin Yu-hsien	15–21, 21–16, 21–9
Women's singles	(Japan) Nozomi Okuhara	(Japan) Sayaka Takahashi	21–8, 21–16
Men's doubles	(Japan) Takeshi Kamura / Keigo Sonoda	(Japan) Hiroyuki Saeki / Ryota Taohata	12–21, 21–16, 21–9
Women's doubles	(Japan) Misaki Matsutomo / Ayaka Takahashi	(Japan) Koharu Yonemoto / Yuriko Miki	21–15, 15–21, 21–12
Mixed doubles	(Japan) Ryota Taohata / Ayaka Takahashi	(Japan) Takeshi Kamura / Koharu Yonemoto	21–14, 21–16

=== Vietnam Open ===
Category	Winners	Runners-up	Score
Men's singles	(Vietnam) Nguyễn Tiến Minh	(Japan) Takuma Ueda	21–14, 21–19
Women's singles	(Thailand) Porntip Buranaprasertsuk	(Indonesia) Lindaweni Fanetri	21–10, 21–18
Men's doubles	(Thailand) Bodin Isara / Maneepong Jongjit	(Indonesia) Yohanes Rendy Sugiarto / Afiat Yuris Wirawan	19–21, 21–16, 21–11
Women's doubles	(Indonesia) Pia Zebadiah Bernadet / Rizki Amelia Pradipta	(Malaysia) Ng Hui Ern / Ng Hui Lin	21–17, 21–19
Mixed doubles	(Indonesia) Markis Kido / Pia Zebadiah Bernadet	(Malaysia) Tan Aik Quan / Lai Pei Jing	23–21, 21–8

=== Dutch Open ===
Category	Winners	Runners-up	Score
Men's singles	(Netherlands) Eric Pang	(Netherlands) Dicky Palyama	21–14, 21–10
Women's singles	(Czech Republic) Kristína Gavnholt	(Netherlands) Judith Meulendijks	14–21, 21–13, 21–17
Men's doubles	(Indonesia) Markis Kido / Alvent Yulianto	(Malaysia) Gan Teik Chai / Ong Soon Hock	18–21, 21–13, 21–14
Women's doubles	(Netherlands) Selena Piek / Iris Tabeling	(Netherlands) Samantha Barning / Eefje Muskens	19–21, 21–16, 22–20
Mixed doubles	(Denmark) Mads Pieler Kolding / Kamilla Rytter Juhl	(England) Marcus Ellis / Gabrielle White	21–15, 21–13
