= 2013 Australian Open Grand Prix Gold =

2013 Australia Open Grand Prix Gold
Tournament details
- Dates: 2–7 April 2013
- Total prize money: US$120,000
- Venue: Sydney Convention and Exhibition Centre
- Location: Sydney, Australia

Champions
- Men's singles: (China) Tian Houwei
- Women's singles: (Japan) Sayaka Takahashi
- Men's doubles: (Indonesia) Angga Pratama (Indonesia) Rian Agung Saputro
- Women's doubles: (Indonesia) Vita Marissa (Indonesia) Variella Aprilsasi
- Mixed doubles: (Indonesia) Irfan Fadhilah (Indonesia) Weni Anggraini

The 2013 Australia Open Grand Prix Gold was the third Grand Prix Gold and Grand Prix tournament of the 2013 BWF Grand Prix Gold and Grand Prix. The tournament was held in Sydney Convention and Exhibition Centre, Sydney, Australia April 2 until April 7, 2013 and had a total purse of $120,000.

== Men's singles ==
=== Seeds ===
1. (Malaysia) Lee Chong Wei (semi-final)
2. (Vietnam) Nguyen Tien Minh (quarter-final)
3. (Malaysia) Daren Liew (third round)
4. (Malaysia) Chong Wei Feng (quarter-final)
5. (Indonesia) Simon Santoso (third round)
6. (Indonesia) Taufik Hidayat (third round)
7. (China) Gao Huan (third round)
8. (Chinese Taipei) Hsu Jen-hao (second round)
9. (India) Ajay Jayaram (second round)
10. (Malaysia) Mohd Arif Abdul Latif (second round)
11. (India) Rajah Menuri Venkata Gurusaidutt (third round)
12. (Indonesia) Alamsyah Yunus (semi-final)
13. (Sri Lanka) Niluka Karunaratne (first round)
14. (India) Anand Pawar (second round)
15. (Japan) Kazumasa Sakai (second round)
16. (Japan) Kento Momota (third round)

=== Finals ===
Quarterfinals
1	(Malaysia) Lee Chong Wei	21	21
(China) Qiao Bin	11	8
4	(Malaysia) Chong Wei Feng	18	13
(China) Tian Houwei	21	21
12	(Indonesia) Alamsyah Yunus	21	21
(South Korea) Lee Dong-keun	12	14
Q5	(China) Xue Song	21	21
2	(Vietnam) Nguyen Tien Minh	15	10

Semifinals
1	(Malaysia) Lee Chong Wei	19	21	18
(China) Tian Houwei	21	17	21
12	(Indonesia) Alamsyah Yunus	10	21	15
Q5	(China) Xue Song	21	18	21

Final
(China) Tian Houwei	20	21	21
Q5	(China) Xue Song	22	13	12

=== Top half ===
==== Section 1 ====
First Round
1	(Malaysia) Lee CW	21	21
(India) A Bhat	10	18
(Indonesia) A Adi	21	21
(Australia) A Joe	4	8
11	(India) R Gurusaidutt	21	21
PFQ	(Australia) Chew H-w	4	7
(Thailand) S Avihingsanon	21	13	21
Q4	(South Korea) Hwang J-s	11	21	12

Second Round
1	(Malaysia) Lee CW	21	21
(Indonesia) A Adi	7	7
11	(India) R Gurusaidutt	21	18	21
(Thailand) S Avihingsanon	14	21	19

Third Round
1	(Malaysia) Lee CW	21	18	21
11	(India) R Gurusaidutt	10	21	15

==== Section 2 ====
First Round
8	(Chinese Taipei) Hsu J-h	21	21
(Norway) J Christensen	15	11
Q3	(Australia) A Li	2	9
(China) Qiao B	21	21
16	(Japan) K Momota	21	21
(Australia) Oon HK	14	13
(Chinese Taipei) Wan C-h	21	21
(Australia) N Tang	6	14

Second Round
8	(Chinese Taipei) Hsu J-h	18	20
(China) Qiao B	21	22
16	(Japan) K Momota	21	21
(Chinese Taipei) Wan C-h	16	17

Third Round
(China) Qiao B	21	21
16	(Japan) K Momota	19	18

==== Section 3 ====
First Round
4	(Malaysia) Chong WF	21	21
Q2	(Australia) K Ng	9	11
(New Zealand) J Wu	7	16
(Malaysia) K Yogendran	21	21
14	(India) A Pawar	19	21	21
(Indonesia) A Ramadhan	21	11	13
(Malaysia) Z Zulkiffli	21	21
(New Zealand) T Ellis	14	16

Second Round
4	(Malaysia) Chong WF	21	21
(Malaysia) K Yogendran	17	14
14	(India) A Pawar	21	0^{r}
(Malaysia) Z Zulkiffli	18	0

Third Round
4	(Malaysia) Chong WF	21	21
(Malaysia) Z Zulkiffli	19	15

==== Section 4 ====
First Round
5	(Indonesia) S Santoso	21	21
Q1	(Australia) C Chen	8	5
(Thailand) A Namkul	21	22
Q8	(New Zealand) C Cheng	17	20
10	(Malaysia) A Abdul Latif	14	21	21
(South Korea) Hong J-h	21	18	16
(Malaysia) Kuan BH	8	16
(China) Tian HW	21	21

Second Round
5	(Indonesia) S Santoso	21	21
(Thailand) A Namkul	7	13
10	(Malaysia) A Abdul Latif	21	10	7
(China) Tian HW	18	21	21

Third Round
5	(Indonesia) S Santoso	21	17	14
(China) Tian HW	16	21	21

=== Bottom half ===
==== Section 5 ====
First Round
PFQ	(Australia) G Ho	5	11
(Malaysia) Goh SH	21	21
(Thailand) P Thongnuam	15	14
12	(Indonesia) A Yunus	21	21
(Australia) L Chong	21	21
(New Zealand) M Fowke	18	15
(Chinese Taipei) Lin Y-h	4	12
7	(China) Gao H	21	21

Second Round
(Malaysia) Goh SH	17	21	7
12	(Indonesia) A Yunus	21	17	21
(Australia) L Chong	8	10
7	(China) Gao H	21	21

Third Round
12	(Indonesia) A Yunus	16	21	21
7	(China) Gao H	21	9	13

==== Section 6 ====
First Round
(Chinese Taipei) Wang T-w	9	21	18
(South Korea) Lee D-k	21	17	21
(Malaysia) Chan KB	11	14
9	(India) A Jayaram	21	21
(Indonesia) R Subagja	21	21
(India) C Anand	14	16
(Norway) M Myhre	21	11	11
3	(Malaysia) D Liew	18	21	21

Second Round
(South Korea) Lee D-k	26	21
9	(India) A Jayaram	24	19
(Indonesia) R Subagja	19	15
3	(Malaysia) D Liew	21	21

Third Round
(South Korea) Lee D-k	21	17	21
3	(Malaysia) D Liew	14	21	15

==== Section 7 ====
First Round
Q5	(China) Xue S	21	21
(Chinese Taipei) Cheng P-w	17	11
(Indonesia) W Prasetyo	13	21	16
15	(Japan) K Sakai	21	13	21
(Australia) W Caulkett	14	14
(Republic of Ireland) S Evans	21	21
(Australia) M Fariman	12	11
6	(Indonesia) T Hidayat	21	21

Second Round
Q5	(China) Xue S	22	21
15	(Japan) K Sakai	20	12
(Republic of Ireland) S Evans	9	13
6	(Indonesia) T Hidayat	21	21

Third Round
Q5	(China) Xue S	21	21
6	(Indonesia) T Hidayat	15	18

==== Section 8 ====
First Round
(Malaysia) Chiang JS	18	11
(China) Guo K	21	21
(South Korea) Park S-m	21	11	21
13	(Sri Lanka) N Karunaratne	17	21	14
Q7	(Australia) L Bui	16	20
Q6	(Australia) M Wheller	21	22
(Malaysia) I Zainuddin	21	9	8
2	(Vietnam) Nguyen TM	17	21	21

Second Round
(China) Guo K	21	13	21
(South Korea) Park S-m	18	21	19
Q6	(Australia) M Wheller	7	5
2	(Vietnam) Nguyen TM	21	21

Third Round
(China) Guo K	19	20
2	(Vietnam) Nguyen TM	21	22

== Women's singles ==
=== Seeds ===
1. (Indonesia) Lindaweni Fanetri (quarter-final)
2. (Thailand) Sapsiree Taerattanachai (quarter-final)
3. (Chinese Taipei) Pai Hsiao-ma (semi-final)
4. (Thailand) Nichaon Jindapon (final)
5. (Indonesia) Aprilia Yuswandari (first round)
6. (Japan) Nozomi Okuhara (withdrew)
7. (Japan) Sayaka Takahashi (champion)
8. (Malaysia) Sonia Cheah Su Ya (second round)

=== Finals ===
Semifinals
(China) Suo Di	21	8	11
4	(Thailand) Nichaon Jindapon	9	21	21
3	(Chinese Taipei) Pai Hsiao-ma	16	15
7	(Japan) Sayaka Takahashi	21	21

Final
4	(Thailand) Nichaon Jindapon	22	10
7	(Japan) Sayaka Takahashi	24	21

=== Top half ===
==== Section 1 ====
First Round
1	(Indonesia) L Fanetri	14	21	22
Q2	(South Korea) Kang H-w	21	16	20
(Japan) Y Hashimoto	21	21
(India) S Jasti	5	13
PFQ	(Indonesia) M Kurniawan	13	5
(China) Suo D	21	21
(Malaysia) L Cheah	7	21	19
(China) Deng X	21	17	21

Second Round
1	(Indonesia) L Fanetri	21	21
(Japan) Y Hashimoto	16	9
(China) Suo D	21	21
(China) Deng X	16	18

Quarterfinals
1	(Indonesia) L Fanetri	13	18
(China) Suo D	21	21

==== Section 2 ====
First Round
4	(Thailand) N Jindapon	21	21
(Indonesia) R Suwarno	18	13
(Thailand) A Sapniti	20	21	16
(Indonesia) M Wiranto	22	15	21
8	(Malaysia) S Cheah	21	21
(Indonesia) M Nadhir	12	15
(Chinese Taipei) Cheng C-y	12	20
Q3	(China) Hui XR	21	22

Second Round
4	(Thailand) N Jindapon	21	21
(Indonesia) M Wiranto	10	6
8	(Malaysia) S Cheah	15	21
Q3	(China) Hui XR	21	23

Quarterfinals
4	(Thailand) N Jindapon	21	17	21
Q3	(China) Hui XR	16	21	16

=== Bottom half ===
==== Section 3 ====
First Round
(Thailand) P Chochuwong	21	21
(Australia) T Pilven	11	4
(Malaysia) Tee JY	22	11	21
5	(Indonesia) A Yuswandari	20	21	17
PFQ	(Australia) J Tam	11	13
(Malaysia) Yang LL	21	21
(Japan) K Ito	14	21	15
3	(Chinese Taipei) Pai H-m	21	19	21

Second Round
(Thailand) P Chochuwong	13	24	21
(Malaysia) Tee JY	21	22	16
(Malaysia) Yang LL	21	11	10
3	(Chinese Taipei) Pai H-m	17	21	21

Quarterfinals
(Thailand) P Chochuwong	15	7
3	(Chinese Taipei) Pai H-m	21	21

==== Section 4 ====
First Round
(Indonesia) Y Asmarani	21	21
(New Zealand) A Rankin	12	12
Q4	(Australia) J Joe	wo
7	(Japan) S Takahashi
(Thailand) R Prajongjai	9	25	21
(China) Yao X	21	23	16
Q1	(Australia) A Wu	4	3
2	(Thailand) S Taerattanachai	21	21

Second Round
(Indonesia) Y Asmarani	14	13
7	(Japan) S Takahashi	21	21
(Thailand) R Prajongjai	19	17
2	(Thailand) S Taerattanachai	21	21

Quarterfinals
7	(Japan) S Takahashi	21	21
2	(Thailand) S Taerattanachai	11	8

== Men's doubles ==
=== Seeds ===
1. (Malaysia) Koo Kien Keat / Tan Boon Heong (quarter-final)
2. (Indonesia) Angga Pratama / Rian Agung Saputro (champion)
3. (Malaysia) Goh V Shem / Lim Khim Wah (second round)
4. (Malaysia) Mohd Zakry Abdul Latif / Mohd Fairuzizuan Mohd Tazari (semi-final)
5. (Indonesia) Mohammad Ahsan / Hendra Setiawan (final)
6. (Malaysia) Gan Teik Chai / Ong Soon Hock (quarter-final)
7. (Chinese Taipei) Chen Hung-ling / Lu Chia-bin (first round)
8. (Indonesia) Ricky Karanda Suwardi / Muhammad Ulinnuha (quarter-final)

=== Finals ===
Semifinals
5	(Indonesia) Mohammad Ahsan (Indonesia) Hendra Setiawan	21	21
4	(Malaysia) Mohd Zakry Abdul Latif (Malaysia) Mohd Fairuzizuan Mohd Tazari	18	18
(South Korea) Kim Dae-eun (South Korea) Shin Baek-cheol	9	14
2	(Indonesia) Angga Pratama (Indonesia) Rian Agung Saputro	21	21

Final
5	(Indonesia) Mohammad Ahsan (Indonesia) Hendra Setiawan	20	19
2	(Indonesia) Angga Pratama (Indonesia) Rian Agung Saputro	22	21

=== Top half ===
==== Section 1 ====
First Round
1	(Malaysia) Koo KK (Malaysia) Tan BH	24	21
(China) Li G (China) Liu C	22	17
(Thailand) W Ampunsuwan (Thailand) W Uttamang	24	18
Q4	(China) Huang KX (China) Tao JQ	26	21
5	(Indonesia) M Ahsan (Indonesia) H Setiawan	19	21	21
Q3	(China) Li JH (China) Liu YC	21	11	16
(Chinese Taipei) Cheng P-w (Chinese Taipei) Lin Y-h	13	7
(Malaysia) Chooi KM (Malaysia) Ow YH	21	21

Second Round
1	(Malaysia) Koo KK (Malaysia) Tan BH	21	21
Q4	(China) Huang KX (China) Tao JQ	13	6
5	(Indonesia) M Ahsan (Indonesia) H Setiawan	21	21
(Malaysia) Chooi KM (Malaysia) Ow YH	9	16

Quarterfinals
1	(Malaysia) Koo KK (Malaysia) Tan BH	18	15
5	(Indonesia) M Ahsan (Indonesia) H Setiawan	21	21

==== Section 2 ====
First Round
4	(Malaysia) Z Abdul Latif (Malaysia) F Tazari	21	21
Q2	(Australia) S Liu (Australia) Pham TH	11	15
(Australia) R Middleton (Australia) R Smith	17	17
(Chinese Taipei) Chen C-j (Chinese Taipei) Lin Y-l	21	21
6	(Malaysia) Gan TC (Malaysia) Ong SH	21	21
(Indonesia) A Adistia (Indonesia) M Gideon	17	18
(Japan) T Kamura (Japan) K Sonoda	21	21
(Norway) J Christensen (Norway) M Myhre	11	10

Second Round
4	(Malaysia) Z Abdul Latif (Malaysia) F Tazari	21	21
(Chinese Taipei) Chen C-j (Chinese Taipei) Lin Y-l	18	19
6	(Malaysia) Gan TC (Malaysia) Ong SH	18	22	21
(Japan) T Kamura (Japan) K Sonoda	21	20	18

Quarterfinals
4	(Malaysia) Z Abdul Latif (Malaysia) F Tazari	21	0
6	(Malaysia) Gan TC (Malaysia) Ong SH	15	0^{r}

=== Bottom half ===
==== Section 3 ====
First Round
Q1	(Australia) H Darmawan (Australia) F Kurniawan	12	5
(Australia) R Tam (Australia) G Warfe	21	21
(Chinese Taipei) Liang J-w (Chinese Taipei) Liao K-h	19	13
8	(Indonesia) R Suwardi (Indonesia) M Ulinnuha	21	21
(South Korea) Kim D-e (South Korea) Shin B-c	21	21
PFQ	(Chinese Taipei) Wan C-h (Chinese Taipei) Wang T-w	13	15
(Thailand) M Jongjit (Thailand) N Puangpuapech	15	20
3	(Malaysia) Goh VS (Malaysia) Lim KW	21	22

Second Round
(Australia) R Tam (Australia) G Warfe	20	12
8	(Indonesia) R Suwardi (Indonesia) M Ulinnuha	22	21
(South Korea) Kim D-e (South Korea) Shin B-c	21	21
3	(Malaysia) Goh VS (Malaysia) Lim KW	19	19

Quarterfinals
8	(Indonesia) R Suwardi (Indonesia) M Ulinnuha	21	17	12
(South Korea) Kim D-e (South Korea) Shin B-c	13	21	21

==== Section 4 ====
First Round
(Indonesia) B Angriawan (Indonesia) Y Sugiarto	11	21	21
(Chinese Taipei) Lin Y-j (Chinese Taipei) Wang C-h	21	17	13
(Indonesia) B Septano (Indonesia) A Wirawan	21	21
5	(Chinese Taipei) Chen H-l (Chinese Taipei) Lu C-b	19	14
PFQ	(Australia) C Chen (Australia) M Wheller	3	14
(Japan) H Saeki (Japan) R Taohata	21	21
(Australia) Oon HK (Australia) Yap WH	5	10
2	(Indonesia) A Pratama (Indonesia) R Saputro	21	21

Second Round
(Indonesia) B Angriawan (Indonesia) Y Sugiarto	21	9	21
(Indonesia) B Septano (Indonesia) A Wirawan	16	21	16
(Japan) H Saeki (Japan) R Taohata	19	19
2	(Indonesia) A Pratama (Indonesia) R Saputro	21	21

Quarterfinals
(Indonesia) B Angriawan (Indonesia) Y Sugiarto	11	18
2	(Indonesia) A Pratama (Indonesia) R Saputro	21	21

== Women's doubles ==
=== Seeds ===
1. (Indonesia) Pia Zebadiah Bernadeth / Rizki Amelia Pradipta (first round)
2. (Thailand) Savitree Amitrapai / Sapsiree Taerattanachai (final)
3. (Malaysia) Vivian Hoo Kah Mun / Woon Khe Wei (quarter-final)
4. (Malaysia) Ng Hui Ern / Ng Hui Lin (quarter-final)
5. (South Korea) Jang Ye-na / Kim So-young (first round)
6. (Japan) Reika Kakiiwa / Yuki Fukushima (quarter-final)
7. (Indonesia) Komala Dewi / Jenna Gozali (quarter-final)
8. (Indonesia) Vita Marissa / Variella Aprilsasi (champion)

=== Finals ===
Semifinals
(South Korea) Ko A-ra (South Korea) Yoo Hae-won	21	11	12
8	(Indonesia) Vita Marissa (Indonesia) Variella Aprilsasi	19	21	21
(China) Chen Qingchen (China) Huang Dongping	17	28	15
2	(Thailand) Savitree Amitrapai (Thailand) Sapsiree Taerattanachai	21	26	21

Final
8	(Indonesia) Vita Marissa (Indonesia) Variella Aprilsasi	21	21
2	(Thailand) Savitree Amitrapai (Thailand) Sapsiree Taerattanachai	19	15

=== Top half ===
==== Section 1 ====
First Round
1	(Indonesia) P Z Bernadeth (Indonesia) R Pradipta	21	16	17
(South Korea) Ko A-r (South Korea) Yoo H-w	9	21	21
(New Zealand) A Rankin (New Zealand) M Stapleton	10	10
(Malaysia) S Cheah (Malaysia) Yang LL	21	21
6	(Japan) R Kakiiwa (Japan) Y Fukushima	21	21
(Thailand) P Chochuwong (Thailand) C Teachavorasinskun	12	16
(Malaysia) Chow MK (Malaysia) Lee MY	21	21
(Thailand) P Arkornsakul (Thailand) J Kittiharakul	13	18

Second Round
(South Korea) Ko A-r (South Korea) Yoo H-w	21	21
(Malaysia) S Cheah (Malaysia) Yang LL	13	8
6	(Japan) R Kakiiwa (Japan) Y Fukushima	21	21
(Malaysia) Chow MK (Malaysia) Lee MY	17	15

Quarterfinals
(South Korea) Ko A-r (South Korea) Yoo H-w	18	21	21
6	(Japan) R Kakiiwa (Japan) Y Fukushima	21	11	16

==== Section 2 ====
First Round
3	(Malaysia) V Hoo (Malaysia) Woon KW	17	21	21
(Thailand) R Chuthabunditkul (Thailand) C Julrattanamanee	21	19	15
(Australia) V Kessler (Australia) T Saunders
(Thailand) A Serithammarak (Thailand) P Munkitamorn	wo
8	(Indonesia) V Marissa (Indonesia) V Aprilsasi	24	21
(China) Ou DN (China) Tang YT	22	17
(Australia) E Tanaka (Australia) R Veeran	21	21
(New Zealand) S Leydon-Davis (New Zealand) E Rogers	9	5

Second Round
3	(Malaysia) V Hoo (Malaysia) Woon KW	21	21
(Australia) V Kessler (Australia) T Saunders	6	14
8	(Indonesia) V Marissa (Indonesia) V Aprilsasi	21	21
(Australia) E Tanaka (Australia) R Veeran	17	8

Quarterfinals
3	(Malaysia) V Hoo (Malaysia) Woon KW	11	19
8	(Indonesia) V Marissa (Indonesia) V Aprilsasi	21	21

=== Bottom half ===
==== Section 3 ====
First Round
(Indonesia) A Awanda (Indonesia) G Polii	21	21
(New Zealand) A Brown (New Zealand) K Gregory	9	10
(China) Chen QC (China) Huang DP	21	24
5	(South Korea) Jang Y-n (South Korea) Kim S-y	10	22
(Australia) V Babenko (Australia) G Gilco	7	8
(Japan) N Fukuman (Japan) K Yonao	21	21
(Australia) T Chow (Australia) E Kwok	6	7
4	(Malaysia) Ng HE (Malaysia) Ng HL	21	21

Second Round
(Indonesia) A Awanda (Indonesia) G Polii	16	17
(China) Chen QC (China) Huang DP	21	21
(Japan) N Fukuman (Japan) K Yonao	17	21	19
4	(Malaysia) Ng HE (Malaysia) Ng HL	21	7	21

Quarterfinals
(China) Chen QC (China) Huang DP	21	15	21
4	(Malaysia) Ng HE (Malaysia) Ng HL	15	21	15

==== Section 4 ====
First Round
(Australia) J Tam (Australia) M Tam	8	7
(China) Xiao T (China) Xiong R	21	21
(Australia) R Serasinghe (Australia) A Wu	8	6
7	(Indonesia) K Dewi (Indonesia) J Gozali	21	21
(Australia) J Guan (Australia) G Somerville	18	7
(Chinese Taipei) Cheng C-y (Chinese Taipei) Wu T-j	21	21
(Australia) V Mak (Australia) N Sharp	9	4
2	(Thailand) S Amitrapai (Thailand) S Taerattanachai	21	21

Second Round
(China) Xiao T (China) Xiong R	18	18
7	(Indonesia) K Dewi (Indonesia) J Gozali	21	21
(Chinese Taipei) Cheng C-y (Chinese Taipei) Wu T-j	10	11
2	(Thailand) S Amitrapai (Thailand) S Taerattanachai	21	21

Quarterfinals
7	(Indonesia) K Dewi (Indonesia) J Gozali	9	9
2	(Thailand) S Amitrapai (Thailand) S Taerattanachai	21	21

== Mixed doubles ==
=== Seeds ===
1. (Indonesia) Markis Kido / Pia Zebadiah Bernadeth (quarter-final)
2. (Indonesia) Riky Widianto / Richi Puspita Dili (quarter-final)
3. (Indonesia) Irfan Fadhilah / Weni Anggraini (champion)
4. (Malaysia) Tan Aik Quan / Lai Pei Jing (quarter-final)
5. (Thailand) Patiphat Chalardchaleam / Savitree Amitrapai (first round)
6. (Indonesia) Praveen Jordan / Vita Marissa (first round)
7. (South Korea) Shin Baek-cheol / Jang Ye-na (final)
8. (South Korea) Kim Dae-eun / Kim So-young (quarter-final)

=== Finals ===
Semifinals
Q4	(China) Liu Yuchen (China) Huang Dongping	19	21	20
3	(Indonesia) Irfan Fadhilah (Indonesia) Weni Anggraini	21	13	22
Q1	(China) Huang Kaixiang (China) Chen Qingchen	25	13	19
7	(South Korea) Shin Baek-cheol (South Korea) Jang Ye-na	23	21	21

Final
3	(Indonesia) Irfan Fadhilah (Indonesia) Weni Anggraini	21	22	21
7	(South Korea) Shin Baek-cheol (South Korea) Jang Ye-na	14	24	16

=== Top half ===
==== Section 1 ====
First Round
1	(Indonesia) M Kido (Indonesia) P Z Bernadeth	21	21
(Australia) M Wheller (Australia) Xu Y	14	12
(Australia) G Sam (Australia) V Babenko	6	13
(New Zealand) K Dennerly-Minturn (New Zealand) K Gregory	21	21
6	(Indonesia) P Jordan (Indonesia) V Marissa	12	18
Q4	(China) Liu YC (China) Huang DP	21	21
(Australia) R Smith (Australia) R Veeran	22	10	17
(Chinese Taipei) Chen H-l (Chinese Taipei) Wu T-j	20	21	21

Second Round
1	(Indonesia) M Kido (Indonesia) P Z Bernadeth	21	21
(New Zealand) K Dennerly-Minturn (New Zealand) K Gregory	10	11
Q4	(China) Liu YC (China) Huang DP	19	21	21
(Chinese Taipei) Chen H-l (Chinese Taipei) Wu T-j	21	15	16

Quarterfinals
1	(Indonesia) M Kido (Indonesia) P Z Bernadeth	21	16	19
Q4	(China) Liu YC (China) Huang DP	19	21	21

==== Section 2 ====
First Round
3	(Indonesia) I Fadhilah (Indonesia) W Anggraini	21	20	21
(Malaysia) Chooi KM (Malaysia) Chow MK	11	22	13
(Chinese Taipei) Lu C-b (Chinese Taipei) Cheng C-y	18	21	13
(Malaysia) Gan TC (Malaysia) Ng HL	21	18	21
8	(South Korea) Kim D-e (South Korea) Kim S-y	21	21
(Thailand) W Ampunsuwan (Thailand) R Chuthabunditkul	15	15
Q2	(Australia) V Ng (Australia) I Meidiwinata	4	8
PFQ	(China) Tao JQ (China) Tang YT	21	21

Second Round
3	(Indonesia) I Fadhilah (Indonesia) W Anggraini	14	21	21
(Malaysia) Gan TC (Malaysia) Ng HL	21	13	11
8	(South Korea) Kim D-e (South Korea) Kim S-y	21	21
PFQ	(China) Tao JQ (China) Tang YT	18	9

Quarterfinals
3	(Indonesia) I Fadhilah (Indonesia) W Anggraini	21	21
8	(South Korea) Kim D-e (South Korea) Kim S-y	17	12

=== Bottom half ===
==== Section 3 ====
First Round
(Malaysia) V Mawan (Malaysia) S Saniru	21	21
(Australia) G Ho (Australia) A Wu	9	13
Q1	(China) Huang KX (China) Chen QC	21	21
5	(Thailand) P Chalardchaleam (Thailand) S Amitrapai	15	17
(Australia) J Findlay (Australia) T Pilven	6	11
Q3	(China) Li JH (China) Ou DN	21	21
(Chinese Taipei) Lin Y-j (Chinese Taipei) Pai H-m	14	15
4	(Malaysia) Tan AQ (Malaysia) Lai PJ	21	21

Second Round
(Malaysia) V Mawan (Malaysia) S Saniru	18	23	10
Q1	(China) Huang KX (China) Chen QC	21	21	21
Q3	(China) Li JH (China) Ou DN	18	21	17
4	(Malaysia) Tan AQ (Malaysia) Lai PJ	21	17	21

Quarterfinals
Q1	(China) Huang KX (China) Chen QC	21	21
4	(Malaysia) Tan AQ (Malaysia) Lai PJ	15	14

==== Section 4 ====
First Round
(New Zealand) M Fowke (New Zealand) E Rodgers	10	20
(Australia) L Chong (Australia) T Saunders	21	22
PFQ	(Australia) D Soon (Australia) E Kwok	6	9
7	(South Korea) Shin B-c (South Korea) Jang Y-n	21	21
(Thailand) W Uttamang (Thailand) C Julrattanamanee	15	19
(Indonesia) M Gideon (Indonesia) V Aprilsasi	21	21
(Japan) R Taohata (Japan) N Fukuman	21	7
2	(Indonesia) R Widianto (Indonesia) R Dili	23	21

Second Round
(Australia) L Chong (Australia) T Saunders	5	11
7	(South Korea) Shin B-c (South Korea) Jang Y-n	21	21
(Indonesia) M Gideon (Indonesia) V Aprilsasi	17	18
2	(Indonesia) R Widianto (Indonesia) R Dili	21	21

Quarterfinals
7	(South Korea) Shin B-c (South Korea) Jang Y-n	21	7	21
2	(Indonesia) R Widianto (Indonesia) R Dili	16	21	13

Preceded by 2013 Swiss Open Grand Prix Gold	BWF Grand Prix Gold and Grand Prix; 2013 season	Succeeded by 2013 New Zealand Open Grand Prix
