= 2012 Malaysia Open Grand Prix Gold =

Tournament details
- Dates: 2–6 May
- Level: Grand Prix Gold
- Total prize money: US$120,000
- Venue: Stadium Bandaraya
- Location: Johor Bahru, Malaysia

Champions
- Men's singles: (Malaysia) Lee Chong Wei
- Women's singles: (Thailand) Busanan Ongbamrungphan
- Men's doubles: (Malaysia) Koo Kien Keat (Malaysia) Tan Boon Heong
- Women's doubles: (Malaysia) Chin Eei Hui (Malaysia) Wong Pei Tty
- Mixed doubles: (Malaysia) Chan Peng Soon (Malaysia) Goh Liu Ying

The 2012 Malaysia Open Grand Prix Gold was the fourth grand prix gold and grand prix tournament of the 2012 BWF Grand Prix Gold and Grand Prix. The tournament was held in Stadium Bandaraya, Johor Bahru, Malaysia from 2 until 6 May 2012 and had a total purse of $120,000.

== Men's singles ==
=== Seeds ===
1. (Malaysia) Lee Chong Wei (champion)
2. (Vietnam) Nguyen Tien Minh (third round)
3. (Indonesia) Tommy Sugiarto (semi-final)
4. (Malaysia) Daren Liew (third round)
5. (Japan) Takuma Ueda (quarter-final)
6. (Malaysia) Muhammad Hafiz Hashim (semi-final)
7. (India) Sourabh Varma (quarter-final)
8. (Malaysia) Chong Wei Feng (quarter-final)

=== Finals ===
Quarterfinals
1	(Malaysia) Lee Chong Wei	21	15	21
8	(Malaysia) Chong Wei Feng	18	21	8
3	(Indonesia) Tommy Sugiarto	21	21
7	(India) Sourabh Varma	17	14
6	(Malaysia) Muhammad Hafiz Hashim	21	21
(India) Prannoy Kumar	14	20
5	(Japan) Takuma Ueda	16	24	15
(Indonesia) Sony Dwi Kuncoro	21	22	21

Semifinals
1	(Malaysia) Lee Chong Wei	21	21
3	(Indonesia) Tommy Sugiarto	18	18
6	(Malaysia) Muhammad Hafiz Hashim	19	10
(Indonesia) Sony Dwi Kuncoro	21	21

Final
1	(Malaysia) Lee Chong Wei	17	21	21
(Indonesia) Sony Dwi Kuncoro	21	8	10

=== Top half ===
==== Section 1 ====
First Round
1	(Malaysia) Lee CW
BYE
(New Zealand) M Fowke	13	21	21
(Australia) N Oon	21	13	16
(Indonesia) E Sukamta	21	17	21
(South Korea) Ha Y-w	12	21	16
(India) S Praneeth	24	18	21
(Indonesia) W Prasetyo	22	21	16

Second Round
1	(Malaysia) Lee CW	21	21
(New Zealand) M Fowke	7	10
(Indonesia) E Sukamta	21	19	13
(India) S Praneeth	16	21	21

Third Round
1	(Malaysia) Lee CW	21	21
(India) S Praneeth	12	13

==== Section 2 ====
First Round
8	(Malaysia) Chong WF
BYE
(South Korea) Lee H-j	13	16
(Japan) K Momota	21	21
(Malaysia) Goh SH	21	21
(Indonesia) R Subagja	17	11
(Indonesia) S Rhustavito	21	21
(India) A Sridhar	15	19

Second Round
8	(Malaysia) Chong WF	21	18	22
(Japan) K Momota	14	21	20
(Malaysia) Goh SH	21	21
(Indonesia) S Rhustavito	19	16

Third Round
8	(Malaysia) Chong WF	22	21	21
(Malaysia) Goh SH	24	14	11

==== Section 3 ====
First Round
3	(Indonesia) T Sugiarto
BYE
(Malaysia) S Ismail	20	15
(South Korea) Park S-m	22	21
(Maldives) M Rasheed	16	10
(Malaysia) B Wong	21	21
(India) S Verma	13	21	11
(Malaysia) I Zainuddin	21	14	21

Second Round
3	(Indonesia) T Sugiarto	21	21
(South Korea) Park S-m	6	16
(Malaysia) B Wong	18	21	9
(Malaysia) I Zainuddin	21	17	21

Third Round
3	(Indonesia) T Sugiarto	21	21
(Malaysia) I Zainuddin	10	11

==== Section 4 ====
First Round
7	(India) S Varma
BYE
(Vietnam) Nguyen HN	17	11
(Japan) S Wada	21	21
(Singapore) A Chen	19	21	21
(Estonia) R Must	21	19	12
(Malaysia) Z Zulkiffli	21	21
(Indonesia) A G Dharma	19	17

Second Round
7	(India) S Varma	21	10	21
(Japan) S Wada	7	21	14
(Singapore) A Chen	21	19	21
(Malaysia) Z Zulkiffli	16	21	13

Third Round
7	(India) S Varma	21	21
(Singapore) A Chen	18	16

=== Bottom half ===
==== Section 5 ====
First Round
(Canada) B Wynn-Morris	6	4
(Malaysia) M R Misbun	21	21
(New Zealand) L Charlesworth	16	12
(Malaysia) W Neo	21	21
(Malaysia) Lim YF	12	4
(South Korea) Lee D-k	21	21
(Australia) M Fariman	8	8
6	(Malaysia) H Hashim	21	21

Second Round
(Malaysia) M R Misbun	21	21
(Malaysia) W Neo	15	16
(South Korea) Lee D-k	18	14
6	(Malaysia) H Hashim	21	21

Third Round
(Malaysia) M R Misbun	13	14
6	(Malaysia) H Hashim	21	21

==== Section 6 ====
First Round
(Switzerland) I Jenny	21	13	21
(Malaysia) Lim YS	19	21	9
(Malaysia) Chong KH	10	15
(India) P Kumar	21	21
(Malaysia) A Abdul Latif	14	12
(India) S Kidambi	21	21
BYE
4	(Malaysia) D Liew

Second Round
(Switzerland) I Jenny	8	10
(India) P Kumar	21	21
(India) S Kidambi	21	17	8
4	(Malaysia) D Liew	18	21	21

Third Round
(India) P Kumar	21	21
4	(Malaysia) D Liew	18	19

==== Section 7 ====
First Round
(Mauritius) C Paul	7	16
(Hong Kong) Wei N	21	21
(Japan) R Takeshita
(Malaysia) Chan KB	wo
(Singapore) R Gonansa	18	7
(Malaysia) Lim FY	21	21
BYE
5	(Japan) T Ueda

Second Round
(Hong Kong) Wei N	21	21
(Japan) R Takeshita	15	14
(Malaysia) Lim FY	18	15
5	(Japan) T Ueda	21	21

Third Round
(Hong Kong) Wei N	21	13	20
5	(Japan) T Ueda	10	21	22

==== Section 8 ====
First Round
(Malaysia) Kuan BH	11	11
(Indonesia) S Kuncoro	21	21
(Singapore) Huang C
(Malaysia) Pei WC	wo
(Indonesia) A Marteen	13	15
(India) A Pawar	21	21
BYE
2	(Vietnam) Nguyen TM

Second Round
(Indonesia) S Kuncoro	21	21
(Singapore) Huang C	17	12
(India) A Pawar	20	11
2	(Vietnam) Nguyen TM	22	21

Third Round
(Indonesia) S Kuncoro	21	21
2	(Vietnam) Nguyen TM	16	16

== Women's singles ==
=== Seeds ===
1. (India) P. V. Sindhu (semi-final)
2. (Japan) Minatsu Mitani (second round)
3. (Hong Kong) Chan Tsz Ka (quarter-final)
4. (Indonesia) Aprilia Yuswandari (quarter-final)

=== Finals ===
Semifinals
1	(India) P. V. Sindhu	19	12
(Japan) Sayaka Takahashi	21	21
(Thailand) Busanan Ongbumrungpan	21	21
(Singapore) Xing Aiying	18	17

Final
(Japan) Sayaka Takahashi	17	20
(Thailand) Busanan Ongbumrungpan	21	22

=== Top half ===
==== Section 1 ====
First Round
1	(India) PV Sindhu
BYE
(Mauritius) K Foo Kune	9	12
(India) N Pandit	21	21
(Malaysia) S Cheah	26	18
(Japan) K Ito	28	21
(New Zealand) M Chan	21	18	21
(South Korea) Park S-y	13	21	13

Second Round
1	(India) PV Sindhu	21	21
(India) N Pandit	9	12
(Japan) K Ito	21	21
(New Zealand) M Chan	17	16

Quarterfinals
1	(India) PV Sindhu	21	21
(Japan) K Ito	19	15

==== Section 2 ====
First Round
3	(Hong Kong) Chan TK	21	21
(Malaysia) L Cheah	19	11
(Thailand) S Ponsana	18	19
(Indonesia) B Manuputty	21	21
(Malaysia) Yang LL	11	9
(Japan) S Takahashi	21	21
(Russia) I Inozemceva	2	6
(Japan) K Imabeppu	21	21

Second Round
3	(Hong Kong) Chan TK	21	21
(Indonesia) B Manuputty	14	14
(Japan) S Takahashi	21	21
(Japan) K Imabeppu	11	13

Quarterfinals
3	(Hong Kong) Chan TK	13	16
(Japan) S Takahashi	21	21

=== Bottom half ===
==== Section 3 ====
First Round
(Hong Kong) Chan HY	18	17
(Thailand) B Ongbumrungpan	21	21
(Japan) M Sekiya	21	21
(Indonesia) H Desi	19	15
(Hong Kong) Cheung NY	21	21
(Malaysia) J Wong	9	15
(Hong Kong) Mong KY	21	9	11
4	(Indonesia) A Yuswandari	14	21	21

Second Round
(Thailand) B Ongbumrungpan	21	16	21
(Japan) M Sekiya	13	21	16
(Hong Kong) Cheung NY	21	17	11
4	(Indonesia) A Yuswandari	10	21	21

Quarterfinals
(Thailand) B Ongbumrungpan	21	21
4	(Indonesia) A Yuswandari	11	14

==== Section 4 ====
First Round
(Japan) N Okuhara	16	21	21
(Malaysia) S Saniru	21	12	15
(Malaysia) Tee JY	21	21
(India) PC Thulasi	14	16
(Singapore) Xing AY	21	21
(South Korea) Kim S-j	10	16
BYE
2	(Japan) M Mitani

Second Round
(Japan) N Okuhara	21	21
(Malaysia) Tee JY	17	10
(Singapore) Xing AY	21	21
2	(Japan) M Mitani	19	10

Quarterfinals
(Japan) N Okuhara	17	22	18
(Singapore) Xing AY	21	20	21

== Men's doubles ==
=== Seeds ===
1. (Malaysia) Koo Kien Keat / Tan Boon Heong (champion)
2. (Indonesia) Markis Kido / Hendra Setiawan (withdrew)
3. (Malaysia) Goh V Shem / Lim Khim Wah (second round)
4. (Japan) Yoshiteru Hirobe / Kenta Kazuno (first round)
5. (South Korea) Cho Gun-woo / Kang Ji-wook (withdrew)
6. (Indonesia) Markus Fernaldi Gideon / Agripinna Prima Rahmanto Putra (second round)
7. (Indonesia) Yohanes Rendy Sugiarto / Afiat Yuris Wirawan (second round)
8. (Malaysia) Mohd Lutfi Zaim Abdul Khalid / Vountus Indra Mawan (quarter-final)

=== Finals ===
Semifinals
1	(Malaysia) Koo Kien Keat (Malaysia) Tan Boon Heong	17	21	21
(Malaysia) Mohd Zakry Abdul Latif (Malaysia) Mohd Fairuzizuan Tazari	21	16	13
(Malaysia) Gan Teik Chai (Malaysia) Ong Soon Hock	22	6	16
(Malaysia) Chooi Kah Ming (Malaysia) Ow Yao Han	20	21	21

Final
1	(Malaysia) Koo Kien Keat (Malaysia) Tan Boon Heong	21	21
(Malaysia) Chooi Kah Ming (Malaysia) Ow Yao Han	15	19

=== Top half ===
==== Section 1 ====
First Round
1	(Malaysia) Koo KK (Malaysia) Tan BH	21	21
Q2	(India) S. Sanjeeth (India) J Yadav	7	5
(Australia) N Oon (Malaysia) ZH Zainuddin	18	12
(Singapore) T Yeo (Singapore) Liu Y	21	21
7	(Indonesia) Y Sugiarto (Indonesia) A Wirawan	20	21	21
(Malaysia) Chan PS (Malaysia) Ong JG	22	18	16
(Malaysia) J Enos (Malaysia) Tan WT	16	22
(South Korea) Kim D-e (South Korea) Lee S-j	21	24

Second Round
1	(Malaysia) Koo KK (Malaysia) Tan BH	21	21
(Singapore) T Yeo (Singapore) Liu Y	12	13
7	(Indonesia) Y Sugiarto (Indonesia) A Wirawan	24	18	20
(South Korea) Kim D-e (South Korea) Lee S-j	22	21	22

Quarterfinals
1	(Malaysia) Koo KK (Malaysia) Tan BH	21	21
(South Korea) Kim D-e (South Korea) Lee S-j	14	12

==== Section 2 ====
First Round
4	(Japan) Y Hirobe (Japan) K Kazuno	16	21	19
(Malaysia) Low JS (Malaysia) Tan YJ	21	17	21
Q4	(Malaysia) R Abdul Latif (Malaysia) R Abdul Rahman	13	7
(Malaysia) N Heg (Malaysia) Teo EY	21	21
6	(Indonesia) M Gideon (Indonesia) A Putra	21	20	21
(Malaysia) Mak HC (Malaysia) Teo KS	18	22	13
(Malaysia) Z Abdul Latif (Malaysia) F Tazari	21	21
(Hong Kong) Chan TK (Hong Kong) Lo LK	7	15

Second Round
(Malaysia) Low JS (Malaysia) Tan YJ	13	17
(Malaysia) N Heg (Malaysia) Teo EY	21	21
6	(Indonesia) M Gideon (Indonesia) A Putra	19	16
(Malaysia) Z Abdul Latif (Malaysia) F Tazari	21	21

Quarterfinals
(Malaysia) N Heg (Malaysia) Teo EY	14	22	17
(Malaysia) Z Abdul Latif (Malaysia) F Tazari	21	20	21

=== Bottom half ===
==== Section 3 ====
First Round
(Malaysia) Gan TC (Malaysia) Ong SH	21	21
(Singapore) R Gonansa (Singapore) Huang C	16	14
(Malaysia) Chow PC (Malaysia) Tan BS	22	21
PFQ	(South Korea) Ha Y-w (South Korea) Lee H-j	20	19
(Indonesia) R Adianto (Indonesia) B Angriawan	21	23	20
(Malaysia) Hoon TH (Malaysia) Tan WK	15	25	22
(Indonesia) R Suwardi (Indonesia) M Ulinnuha	21	12	15
3	(Malaysia) Goh VS (Malaysia) Lim KW	12	21	21

Second Round
(Malaysia) Gan TC (Malaysia) Ong SH	21	21
(Malaysia) Chow PC (Malaysia) Tan BS	19	14
(Malaysia) Hoon TH (Malaysia) Tan WK	21	21
3	(Malaysia) Goh VS (Malaysia) Lim KW	14	19

Quarterfinals
(Malaysia) Gan TC (Malaysia) Ong SH	21	21
(Malaysia) Hoon TH (Malaysia) Tan WK	18	19

==== Section 4 ====
First Round
BYE
(Hong Kong) Lee CH (Hong Kong) Wong WH
(Indonesia) A Adistia (Indonesia) C Rusdianto	19	16
8	(Malaysia) L Abdul Khalid (Malaysia) V Mawan	21	21
Q1	(Malaysia) J Singh (Malaysia) Yew HK	13	13
(Malaysia) Chooi KM (Malaysia) Ow YH	21	21
(New Zealand) K Dennerly-Minturn (New Zealand) O Leydon-Davis	21	12	21
PFQ	(Vietnam) Duong BD (Vietnam) Nguyen HN	15	21	23

Second Round
(Hong Kong) Lee CH (Hong Kong) Wong WH	21	14	11
8	(Malaysia) L Abdul Khalid (Malaysia) V Mawan	17	21	21
(Malaysia) Chooi KM (Malaysia) Ow YH	21	11	21
PFQ	(Vietnam) Duong BD (Vietnam) Nguyen HN	14	21	16

Quarterfinals
8	(Malaysia) L Abdul Khalid (Malaysia) V Mawan	18	20
(Malaysia) Chooi KM (Malaysia) Ow YH	21	22

== Women's doubles ==
=== Seeds ===
1. (Singapore) Shinta Mulia Sari / Yao Lei (final)
2. (Malaysia) Chin Eei Hui / Wong Pei Tty (champion)
3. (Malaysia) Vivian Hoo Kah Mun / Woon Khe Wei (second round)
4. (Indonesia) Suci Rizki Andini / Della Destiara Haris (second round)

=== Finals ===
Semifinals
1	(Singapore) Shinta Mulia Sari (Singapore) Yao Lei	21	21
(Malaysia) Goh Liu Ying (Malaysia) Lim Yin Loo	18	14
(Japan) Yuki Fukushima (Japan) Yui Miyauchi	19	10
2	(Malaysia) Chin Eei Hui (Malaysia) Wong Pei Tty	21	21

Final
1	(Singapore) Shinta Mulia Sari (Singapore) Yao Lei	18	18
2	(Malaysia) Chin Eei Hui (Malaysia) Wong Pei Tty	21	21

=== Top half ===
==== Section 1 ====
First Round
1	(Singapore) S Sari (Singapore) Yao L
BYE
(Indonesia) G Imawan (Indonesia) T Nuraidah
BYE
(Malaysia) Lai PJ (Malaysia) M Ng
BYE
(South Korea) Lee S-h (South Korea) Shin S-c	21	19	28
(Japan) N Fukuman (Japan) K Yonao	19	21	26

Second Round
1	(Singapore) S Sari (Singapore) Yao L	12	21	21
(Indonesia) G Imawan (Indonesia) T Nuraidah	21	16	13
(Malaysia) Lai PJ (Malaysia) M Ng	wo
(South Korea) Lee S-h (South Korea) Shin S-c

Quarterfinals
1	(Singapore) S Sari (Singapore) Yao L	21	21
(South Korea) Lee S-h (South Korea) Shin S-c	12	17

==== Section 2 ====
First Round
3	(Malaysia) V Hoo (Malaysia) Woon KW
BYE
(Japan) R Eto (Japan) Y Wakita	21	21
(South Korea) Park S-y (South Korea) Kim S-j	8	13
(Indonesia) K Dewi (Indonesia) J Gozali
BYE
(Thailand) S Ekmongkolpaisarn (Thailand) P Munkitchokecharoen	12	15
(Malaysia) Goh LY (Malaysia) Lim YL	21	21

Second Round
3	(Malaysia) V Hoo (Malaysia) Woon KW	2^{r}
(Japan) R Eto (Japan) Y Wakita	5
(Indonesia) K Dewi (Indonesia) J Gozali	18	21	13
(Malaysia) Goh LY (Malaysia) Lim YL	21	5	21

Quarterfinals
(Japan) R Eto (Japan) Y Wakita	21	16	20
(Malaysia) Goh LY (Malaysia) Lim YL	17	21	22

=== Bottom half ===
==== Section 3 ====
First Round
(Malaysia) A Anscelly (Malaysia) Soong FC	21	21	14
(Hong Kong) Chan HY (Hong Kong) Chau HW	23	16	21
BYE
(Indonesia) PZ Bernadeth (Indonesia) R Pradipta
(Singapore) V Neo (Singapore) Thng TT	14	15
(Japan) Y Fukushima (Japan) Y Miyauchi	21	21
BYE
4	(Indonesia) S Andini (Indonesia) D Haris

Second Round
(Hong Kong) Chan HY (Hong Kong) Chau HW	18	21	21
(Indonesia) PZ Bernadeth (Indonesia) R Pradipta	21	16	18
(Japan) Y Fukushima (Japan) Y Miyauchi	21	17	21
4	(Indonesia) S Andini (Indonesia) D Haris	19	21	19

Quarterfinals
(Hong Kong) Chan HY (Hong Kong) Chau HW	17	14
(Japan) Y Fukushima (Japan) Y Miyauchi	21	21

==== Section 4 ====
First Round
(Japan) Y Miki (Japan) K Yonemoto	21	21
(South Korea) Ko A-r (South Korea) Yoo H-y	16	14
BYE
(South Korea) Choi H-i (South Korea) Kim S-y
BYE
(Thailand) B Ongbumrungpan (Thailand) S Ponsana
BYE
2	(Malaysia) Chin EH (Malaysia) Wong PT

Second Round
(Japan) Y Miki (Japan) K Yonemoto	21	17	21
(South Korea) Choi H-i (South Korea) Kim S-y	18	21	15
(Thailand) B Ongbumrungpan (Thailand) S Ponsana	wo
2	(Malaysia) Chin EH (Malaysia) Wong PT

Quarterfinals
(Japan) Y Miki (Japan) K Yonemoto	21	17	11
2	(Malaysia) Chin EH (Malaysia) Wong PT	15	21	21

== Mixed doubles ==
=== Seeds ===
1. (Malaysia) Chan Peng Soon / Goh Liu Ying (champion)
2. (Singapore) Danny Bawa Chrisnanta / Vanessa Neo (semi-final)
3. (Hong Kong) Wong Wai Hong / Chau Hoi Wah (second round)
4. (Malaysia) Tan Aik Quan / Lai Pei Jing (second round)

=== Finals ===
Semifinals
1	(Malaysia) Chan Peng Soon (Malaysia) Goh Liu Ying	21	21
(Indonesia) Riky Widianto (Indonesia) Richi Puspita Dili	18	18
(Indonesia) Irfan Fadhilah (Indonesia) Weni Anggraini	24	21
2	(Singapore) Danny Bawa Chrisnanta (Singapore) Vanessa Neo	22	17

Final
1	(Malaysia) Chan Peng Soon (Malaysia) Goh Liu Ying	21	21
(Indonesia) Irfan Fadhilah (Indonesia) Weni Anggraini	12	14

=== Top half ===
==== Section 1 ====
First Round
1	(Malaysia) Chan PS (Malaysia) Goh LY
BYE
(Switzerland) I Jenny (Russia) I Inozemceva
BYE
(Singapore) Liu Y (Singapore) Thng TT
BYE
(Malaysia) Ong JG (Malaysia) Lim YL	21	16	21
(Thailand) T Lapoe (Thailand) P Munkitchokecharoen	19	21	19

Second Round
1	(Malaysia) Chan PS (Malaysia) Goh LY	21	21
(Switzerland) I Jenny (Russia) I Inozemceva	11	7
(Singapore) Liu Y (Singapore) Thng TT	8	13
(Malaysia) Ong JG (Malaysia) Lim YL	21	21

Quarterfinals
1	(Malaysia) Chan PS (Malaysia) Goh LY	21	23
(Malaysia) Ong JG (Malaysia) Lim YL	14	21

==== Section 2 ====
First Round
3	(Hong Kong) Wong WH (Hong Kong) Chau HW
BYE
(Indonesia) R Widianto (Indonesia) R Dili	21	21
(Singapore) T Yeo (Singapore) D Yuliana	11	19
(South Korea) Lee S-j (South Korea) Yoo H-y
BYE
(New Zealand) O Leydon-Davis (New Zealand) M Chan	13	15
(South Korea) Kim D-e (South Korea) Ko A-r	21	21

Second Round
3	(Hong Kong) Wong WH (Hong Kong) Chau HW	11	19
(Indonesia) R Widianto (Indonesia) R Dili	21	21
(South Korea) Lee S-j (South Korea) Yoo H-y	17	17
(South Korea) Kim D-e (South Korea) Ko A-r	21	21

Quarterfinals
(Indonesia) R Widianto (Indonesia) R Dili	21	21
(South Korea) Kim D-e (South Korea) Ko A-r	19	13

=== Bottom half ===
==== Section 3 ====
First Round
(Mauritius) C Paul (Mauritius) K Foo Kune	10	10
(Malaysia) R Abdul Latif (Malaysia) A Anscelly	21	21
BYE
(Indonesia) A Prasetya (Indonesia) G Widjaja
(Indonesia) I Fadhilah (Indonesia) W Anggraini	22	21
(South Korea) Park S-m (South Korea) Kim S-y	20	14
BYE
4	(Malaysia) Tan AQ (Malaysia) Lai PJ

Second Round
(Malaysia) R Abdul Latif (Malaysia) A Anscelly	21	21
(Indonesia) A Prasetya (Indonesia) G Widjaja	19	13
(Indonesia) I Fadhilah (Indonesia) W Anggraini	21	21
4	(Malaysia) Tan AQ (Malaysia) Lai PJ	8	18

Quarterfinals
(Malaysia) R Abdul Latif (Malaysia) A Anscelly	20	21	16
(Indonesia) I Fadhilah (Indonesia) W Anggraini	22	17	21

==== Section 4 ====
First Round
(South Korea) Kang J-w (South Korea) Lee S-h
(Indonesia) M Kido (Indonesia) PZ Bernadeth	wo
BYE
(Hong Kong) Lee CH (Hong Kong) Mong KY
(Malaysia) B Wong (Malaysia) Soong FC
(South Korea) Cho G-w (South Korea) Choi H-i	wo
BYE
2	(Singapore) D Chrisnanta (Singapore) V Neo

Second Round
(South Korea) Kang J-w (South Korea) Lee S-h	13	21	24
(Hong Kong) Lee CH (Hong Kong) Mong KY	21	14	22
(Malaysia) B Wong (Malaysia) Soong FC	19	17
2	(Singapore) D Chrisnanta (Singapore) V Neo	21	21

Quarterfinals
(South Korea) Kang J-w (South Korea) Lee S-h	18	8
2	(Singapore) D Chrisnanta (Singapore) V Neo	21	21

Preceded by 2012 Australia Open Grand Prix Gold	BWF Grand Prix Gold and Grand Prix; 2012 season	Succeeded by 2012 Thailand Open Grand Prix Gold
