= Aprilsasi Putri Lejarsar Variella =

Indonesian badminton player (born 1990)

Personal information
- Born: 6 April 1990 (age 36) Malang, East Java, Indonesia

Sport
- Country: Indonesia (2004–06, 2010, 2011–17); Turkey (2008–09, 2011); Bahrain (2009)
- Sport: Badminton

Women's singles & doubles
- Highest ranking: 192 (WS 17 December 2009); 10 (WD 5 December 2013); 67 (XD 31 October 2013)
- BWF profile

Aprilsasi Putri Lejarsar Variella (born 6 April 1990) is an Indonesian badminton player who played for Indonesia and also represented Turkey and Bahrain in international tournaments. She won the 2013 Australian Open in the women's doubles event with her partner Vita Marissa.

== Achievements ==
=== BWF Grand Prix ===
The BWF Grand Prix had two levels, the Grand Prix and Grand Prix Gold. It was a series of badminton tournaments sanctioned by the Badminton World Federation (BWF) and played between 2007 and 2017.

Women's doubles
Year	Tournament	Partner	Opponent	Score	Result
2013	Australian Open	(Indonesia) Vita Marissa	(Thailand) Savitree Amitrapai (Thailand) Sapsiree Taerattanachai	21–19, 21–15	(gold) Winner
2013	Malaysia Grand Prix Gold	(Indonesia) Vita Marissa	(Indonesia) Pia Zebadiah Bernadet (Indonesia) Rizki Amelia Pradipta	17–21, 21–16, 17–21	(silver) Runner-up

BWF Grand Prix Gold tournament
BWF Grand Prix tournament

=== BWF International Challenge/Series ===
Women's singles
Year	Tournament	Opponent	Score	Result
2009	Iran Fajr International	(Malaysia) Sannatasah Saniru	17–21, 21–18, 21–17	(gold) Winner
2009	Bahrain International	(Iran) Nejat Zadeh Sahar Zamanian	21–12, 21–18	(gold) Winner

Women's doubles
Year	Tournament	Partner	Opponent	Score	Result
2008	Hellas International	(Turkey) Ezgi Epice	(Denmark) Maria Helsbøl (Denmark) Anne Skelbæk	19–21, 19–21	(silver) Runner-up
2009	Iran Fajr International	(Turkey) Ezgi Epice	(Malaysia) Vivian Hoo Kah Mun (Malaysia) Sannatasah Saniru	9–21, 21–11, 21–9	(gold) Winner
2009	Bahrain International	(Bahrain) Bora Twina	(Iran) Negin Amiripour (Iran) Nejat Zadeh Sahar Zamanian	10–21, 21–13, 15–21	(silver) Runner-up
2010	Singapore International	(Indonesia) Jenna Gozali	(South Korea) Lee Se-rang (South Korea) Yim Jae-eun	19–21, 12–21	(silver) Runner-up
2014	Swiss International	(Indonesia) Meiliana Jauhari	(Bulgaria) Gabriela Stoeva (Bulgaria) Stefani Stoeva	6–11, 5–11, 9–11	(silver) Runner-up
2015	Swiss International	(Indonesia) Pia Zebadiah Bernadet	(Netherlands) Samantha Barning (Netherlands) Iris Tabeling	11–21, 10–21	(silver) Runner-up
2016	Bahrain International	(Bahrain) Tanisha Crasto	(India) Farha Mather (India) Ashna Roy	21–12, 21–18	(gold) Winner

Mixed doubles
Year	Tournament	Partner	Opponent	Score	Result
2009	Bahrain International	(Bahrain) Al Sayed Jaffer Ebrahim Jaffer	(India) Xavier Jaison (India) Jacob Daya Elsa	12–21, 21–16, 21–15	(gold) Winner
2012	Indonesia International	(Indonesia) Trikusuma Wardhana	(South Korea) Lee Jae-jin (South Korea) Yoo Hyun-young	21–19, 13–21, 12–21	(silver) Runner-up

BWF International Challenge tournament
BWF International Series tournament
BWF Future Series tournament
