= Irfan Fadhilah =

Indonesian badminton player

Personal information
- Born: 2 July 1990 (age 36)

Sport
- Country: Indonesia
- Sport: Badminton
- Handedness: Right

Mixed doubles
- Highest ranking: 15 (with Weni Anggraini February 2013)
- BWF profile

Irfan Fadhilah (born 2 July 1990) is an Indonesian badminton player affiliated with Jaya Raya Jakarta club.

== Achievements ==
=== BWF Grand Prix ===
The BWF Grand Prix had two levels, the Grand Prix and Grand Prix Gold. It was a series of badminton tournaments sanctioned by the Badminton World Federation (BWF) and played between 2007 and 2017.

Mixed doubles
Year	Tournament	Partner	Opponent	Score	Result
2012	Malaysia Grand Prix Gold	(Indonesia) Weni Anggraini	(Malaysia) Chan Peng Soon (Malaysia) Goh Liu Ying	12–21, 14–21	(silver) Runner-up
2013	Australian Open	(Indonesia) Weni Anggraini	(South Korea) Shin Baek-cheol (South Korea) Chang Ye-na	21–14, 22–24, 21–16	(gold) Winner
2014	Vietnam Open	(Indonesia) Weni Anggraini	(Indonesia) Muhammad Rijal (Indonesia) Vita Marissa	18–21, 10–21	(silver) Runner-up

BWF Grand Prix Gold tournament
BWF Grand Prix tournament

=== BWF International Challenge/Series ===
Men's doubles
Year	Tournament	Partner	Opponent	Score	Result
2018	Indonesia International	(Indonesia) Markis Kido	(Indonesia) Rian Swastedian (Indonesia) Amri Syahnawi	19–21, 18–21	(silver) Runner-up

Mixed doubles
Year	Tournament	Partner	Opponent	Score	Result
2009	Indonesia International	(Indonesia) Weni Anggraini	(Indonesia) Riky Widianto (Indonesia) Devi Tika Permatasari	12–21, 18–21	(silver) Runner-up
2012	India International	(Indonesia) Weni Anggraini	(Indonesia) Alfian Eko Prasetya (Indonesia) Gloria Emanuelle Widjaja	21–16, 21–19	(gold) Winner
2015	Indonesia International	(Indonesia) Weni Anggraini	(Indonesia) Panji Akbar Sudrajat (Indonesia) Apriyani Rahayu	21–16, 21–16	(gold) Winner
2016	Indonesia International	(Indonesia) Weni Anggraini	(Indonesia) Yantoni Edy Saputra (Indonesia) Marsheilla Gischa Islami	21–19, 16–21, 17–21	(silver) Runner-up
2017	Vietnam International	(Indonesia) Weni Anggraini	(China) Shi Longfei (China) Tang Pingyang	16–21, 21–19, 15–21	(silver) Runner-up
2017	Indonesia International	(Indonesia) Pia Zebadiah Bernadet	(Indonesia) Rehan Naufal Kusharjanto (Indonesia) Siti Fadia Silva Ramadhanti	9–21, 18–21	(silver) Runner-up
2018	Indonesia International	(Indonesia) Pia Zebadiah Bernadet	(Indonesia) Amri Syahnawi (Indonesia) Shella Devi Aulia	17–21, 16–21	(silver) Runner-up

BWF International Challenge tournament
BWF Future Series tournament

== Performance timeline ==
=== Individual competitions ===
- Senior level

Event	2017
World Championships	R1

Tournament	2018	Best
BWF World Tour
Thailand Open	R1	QF (2012)
Indonesia Masters Super 100	R1 (MD); QF (XD)	QF (2018)

Tournament	2012	2013	2014	2015	2016	2017	Best
BWF Grand Prix and Grand Prix Gold
Australian Open		W	SS				W (2013)
Malaysia Masters	F						F (2012)
Vietnam Open			F				F (2014)
Thailand Open	QF	R2	—N/a	R1 (MD); R1 (XD)	A	R2	QF (2012)
