= Weni Anggraini =

Indonesian badminton player

Personal information
- Born: 16 October 1990 (age 36) Sridadi, Jambi, Indonesia

Sport
- Country: Indonesia
- Sport: Badminton
- Handedness: Right

Mixed doubles
- Highest ranking: 15 (with Irfan Fadhilah February 2013)
- BWF profile

Weni Anggraini (born 16 October 1990) is an Indonesian doubles specialist badminton player from Jaya Raya Jakarta club.

== Achievements ==
=== BWF Grand Prix ===
The BWF Grand Prix had two levels, the Grand Prix and Grand Prix Gold. It was a series of badminton tournaments sanctioned by the Badminton World Federation (BWF) and played between 2007 and 2017.

Mixed doubles
Year	Tournament	Partner	Opponent	Score	Result
2012	Malaysia Grand Prix Gold	(Indonesia) Irfan Fadhilah	(Malaysia) Chan Peng Soon (Malaysia) Goh Liu Ying	12–21, 14–21	(silver) Runner-up
2013	Australian Open	(Indonesia) Irfan Fadhilah	(South Korea) Shin Baek-cheol (South Korea) Chang Ye-na	21–14, 22–24, 21–16	(gold) Winner
2014	Vietnam Open	(Indonesia) Irfan Fadhilah	(Indonesia) Muhammad Rijal (Indonesia) Vita Marissa	18–21, 10–21	(silver) Runner-up

BWF Grand Prix Gold tournament
BWF Grand Prix tournament

=== BWF International Challenge/Series ===
Mixed doubles
Year	Tournament	Partner	Opponent	Score	Result
2009	Indonesia International	(Indonesia) Irfan Fadhilah	(Indonesia) Riky Widianto (Indonesia) Devi Tika Permatasari	12–21, 18–21	(silver) Runner-up
2012	India International	(Indonesia) Irfan Fadhilah	(Indonesia) Alfian Eko Prasetya (Indonesia) Gloria Emanuelle Widjaja	21–16, 21–19	(gold) Winner
2015	Indonesia International	(Indonesia) Irfan Fadhilah	(Indonesia) Panji Akbar Sudrajat (Indonesia) Apriani Rahayu	21–16, 21–16	(gold) Winner
2016	Indonesia International	(Indonesia) Irfan Fadhilah	(Indonesia) Yantoni Edy Saputra (Indonesia) Marsheilla Gischa Islami	21–19, 16–21, 17–21	(silver) Runner-up
2017	Vietnam International	(Indonesia) Irfan Fadhilah	(China) Shi Longfei (China) Tang Pingyang	16–21, 21–19, 15–21	(silver) Runner-up

BWF International Challenge tournament
BWF Future Series tournament

== Performance timeline ==
=== Individual competitions ===
- Senior level

Event	2017
BWF World Championships	R1

Tournament	2010	2011	2012	2013	2014	2015	2016	Best
BWF Grand Prix and Grand Prix Gold
Malaysia Masters	R2 (WD); R2 (XD)	A	F (XD)	R1 (XD)	A		R2	F (2012)
(Australia) Australian Open	A			W	SS			W (2013)
Vietnam Open	R2	QF	R1	A	F	R1 (WD); R1 (XD)	QF	F (2014)
