= Chen Yuekun =

Chinese badminton player (born 1990)

Chen Yuekun 陈跃坤
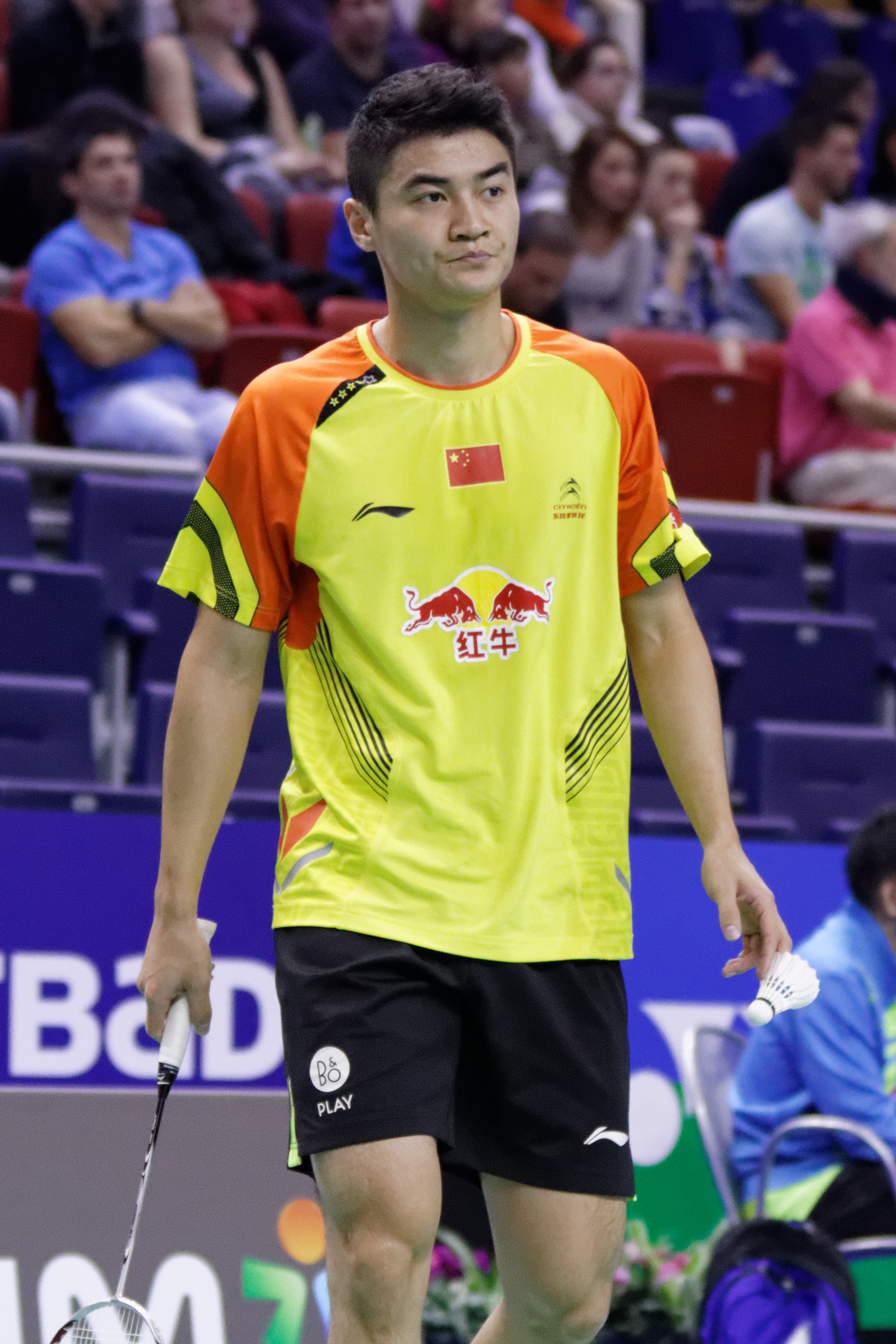

Personal information
- Born: 30 October 1990 (age 36) Wuhan, Hubei, China
- Height: 1.82 m (6 ft 0 in)
- Weight: 75 kg (165 lb)

Sport
- Country: China
- Sport: Badminton
- Handedness: Right

Men's Singles
- Highest ranking: 20 (14 November 2013)
- BWF profile

Chen Yuekun (Chinese: 陈跃坤, born 30 October 1990) is a Chinese badminton player, winner of the Macau and Vietnam opens.

== Achievements ==
=== BWF Grand Prix ===
The BWF Grand Prix had two levels, the Grand Prix and Grand Prix Gold. It was a series of badminton tournaments sanctioned by the Badminton World Federation (BWF) and played between 2007 and 2017.

Men's singles
Year	Tournament	Opponent	Score	Result
2010	Vietnam Open	(Hong Kong) Wei Nan	21–13, 21–14	(gold) Winner
2012	Thailand Open	(Indonesia) Sony Dwi Kuncoro	17–21, 14–21	(silver) Runner-up
2012	Macau Open	(China) Gao Huan	21–9, 21–17	(gold) Winner

BWF Grand Prix Gold tournament
BWF Grand Prix tournament
