= Chan Kwong Beng =

Malaysian-American badminton player (born 1988)

Chan Kwong Beng 曾广铭
Personal information
- Born: 2 June 1988 (age 38) Perak, Malaysia
- Height: 1.73 m (5 ft 8 in)

Sport
- Country: United States
- Sport: Badminton
- Handedness: Right

Men's singles
- Highest ranking: 52 (1 April 2010)
Medal record
Men's badminton
Representing Malaysia
Southeast Asian Games
| Bronze medal – third place | 2007 Nakhon Ratchasima | Men's team |
Asian Junior Championships
| Bronze medal – third place | 2005 Jakarta | Boys' team |

Chan Kwong Beng (born 2 June 1988 in Perak) is a Malaysian badminton player, and in 2017 he started to represent the United States. In 2013, he won the men's singles competition at the Vietnam International under coach Li Mao at the Kawasaki badminton club in Petaliang Jaya.

== Achievements ==
=== BWF International Challenge/Series ===
Men's singles

| Year | Tournament | Opponent | Score | Result |
|---|---|---|---|---|
| 2013 | Vietnam International | (Hong Kong) Ng Ka Long | 21–11, 22–20 | (gold) Winner |
| 2009 | Malaysia International | (Malaysia) Chong Wei Feng | 17–21, 14–21 | (silver) Runner-up |
| 2007 | Cheers Asian Satellite | (Malaysia) Tan Chun Seang | 21–17, 16–21, 10–21 | (silver) Runner-up |

Men's doubles

| Year | Tournament | Partner | Opponent | Score | Result |
|---|---|---|---|---|---|
| 2013 | Swiss International | (Germany) Daniel Benz | (France) Lucas Corvee (France) Brice Leverdez | 21–16, 21–16 | (gold) Winner |

BWF International Challenge tournament
BWF International Series tournament
