= 2013 Scottish Open Grand Prix =

2013 Scottish Grand Prix
Tournament details
- Dates: November 20, 2013 - November 24, 2013
- Total prize money: US$50,000
- Venue: Emirates Arena
- Location: Glasgow, Scotland

The 2013 Scottish Open Grand Prix was the sixteenth grand prix gold and grand prix tournament of the 2013 BWF Grand Prix Gold and Grand Prix. The tournament was held in Emirates Arena, Glasgow, Scotland November 20–24, 2013 and had a total purse of $50,000.

== Men's singles ==
=== Seeds ===
1. (Finland) Ville Lang (semi-final)
2. (Sweden) Henri Hurskainen (final)
3. (France) Brice Leverdez (champion)
4. (Malaysia) Ramdan Misbun (first round)
5. (United States) Sattawat Pongnairat (first round)
6. (Ukraine) Dmytro Zavadsky (quarter-final)
7. (Republic of Ireland) Scott Evans (second round)
8. (Indonesia) Andre Kurniawan Tedjono (semi-final)
9. (Denmark) Joachim Persson (third round)
10. (Czech Republic) Petr Koukal (first round)
11. (France) Lucas Corvée (third round)
12. (Finland) Eetu Heino (third round)
13. (Denmark) Christian Lind Thomsen (third round)
14. (Scotland) Kieran Merrilees (third round)
15. (France) Thomas Rouxel (quarter-final)
16. (Estonia) Raul Must (third round)

=== Finals ===
Quarterfinals
1	(Finland) Ville Lang	21	13
(Malaysia) Chan Kwong Beng	15	4^{r}
3	(France) Brice Leverdez	10	21	21
(Germany) Lukas Schmidt	21	14	19
8	(Indonesia) Andre Kurniawan Tedjono	21	21
15	(France) Thomas Rouxel	6	17
6	(Ukraine) Dmytro Zavadsky	25	13	19
2	(Sweden) Henri Hurskainen	23	21	21

Semifinals
1	(Finland) Ville Lang	13	17
3	(France) Brice Leverdez	21	21
8	(Indonesia) Andre Kurniawan Tedjono	19	18
2	(Sweden) Henri Hurskainen	21	21

Final
3	(France) Brice Leverdez	21	16	21
2	(Sweden) Henri Hurskainen	8	21	16

=== Top half ===
==== Section 1 ====
First round
1	(Finland) V Lang	21	21
(Denmark) F Quach	17	15
(Malaysia) S Misbun	6^{r}
(Netherlands) E Meijs	11
10	(Czech Republic) P Koukal	17	20
PFQ	(Republic of Ireland) J Dolan	21	22
(Netherlands) V de Vries	21	21
(England) S Dobson	18	17

Second round
1	(Finland) V Lang	21	21
(Netherlands) E Meijs	19	16
PFQ	(Republic of Ireland) J Dolan	14	17
(Netherlands) V de Vries	21	21

Third round
1	(Finland) V Lang	21	21
(Netherlands) V de Vries	19	18

==== Section 2 ====
First round
7	(Republic of Ireland) S Evans	21	21
(Sweden) M Borg	13	19
(Malaysia) Chan KB	21	21
(Germany) T Wadenka	17	10
14	(Scotland) K Merrilees	24	21
Q7	(Scotland) S Stewart	22	10
(England) S Phillips	21	21
Q1	(England) A Dolman	12	15

Second round
7	(Republic of Ireland) S Evans	26	19
(Malaysia) Chan KB	28	21
14	(Scotland) K Merrilees	22	21
(England) S Phillips	20	14

Third round
(Malaysia) Chan KB	21	21
14	(Scotland) K Merrilees	15	18

==== Section 3 ====
First round
3	(France) B Leverdez	21	21	21
(Spain) P Abian	23	16	19
(Austria) M Almer	21	21
(Bulgaria) B Kisyov	11	14
9	(Denmark) Ja Persson	21	21
(Sweden) G Ulldahl	15	13
(Germany) D Benz	19	21	21
(Austria) V Vattanirappel	21	19	17

Second round
3	(France) B Leverdez	21	21
(Austria) M Almer	15	12
9	(Denmark) Ja Persson	21	21
(Germany) D Benz	18	15

Third round
3	(France) B Leverdez	21	20	21
9	(Denmark) Ja Persson	9	22	17

==== Section 4 ====
First round
5	(United States) S Pongnairat	15	21	17
(France) L Claerbout	21	19	21
(Germany) L Schmidt	21	21
(England) R Walker	10	8
16	(Estonia) R Must	21	21
Q8	(England) G Mairs	11	7
Q2	(Germany) Jn Persson	21	19	21
Q6	(England) D Adamson	9	21	17

Second round
(France) L Claerbout	14	16
(Germany) L Schmidt	21	21
16	(Estonia) R Must	21	21
Q2	(Germany) Jn Persson	10	18

Third round
(Germany) L Schmidt	12	21	21
16	(Estonia) R Must	21	17	12

=== Bottom half ===
==== Section 5 ====
First round
(Germany) R Domke	8	21	21
(Sweden) M Westerback	21	15	17
(England) M Spencer-Smith	13	8
12	(Finland) E Heino	21	21
(Malaysia) R Rahmat	19	19
PFQ	(Scotland) J Neil	21	21
(Germany) P Kaemnitz	11	16
8	(Indonesia) A Tedjono	21	21

Second round
(Germany) R Domke	11	12
12	(Finland) E Heino	21	21
PFQ	(Scotland) J Neil	16	18
8	(Indonesia) A Tedjono	21	21

Third round
12	(Finland) E Heino	16	17
8	(Indonesia) A Tedjono	21	21

==== Section 6 ====
First round
(Germany) A Trisnanto	21	21
(Czech Republic) M Ludík	6	17
(England) A Lane	17	18
15	(France) T Rouxel	21	21
(Denmark) K Bruun	21	18	21
(Austria) L Wraber	16	21	12
(Denmark) E Holst	21	21
4	(Malaysia) R Misbun	12	13

Second round
(Germany) A Trisnanto	21	12
15	(France) T Rouxel	23	21
(Denmark) K Bruun	14	14
(Denmark) E Holst	21	21

Third round
15	(France) T Rouxel	21	17	21
(Denmark) E Holst	18	21	16

==== Section 7 ====
First round
Q4	(Germany) G Firdaus	5	21	21
(Scotland) M Carder	21	9	15
(Slovenia) I Utrosa	9	19
11	(France) L Corvée	21	21
(Finland) K Lehikoinen	21	21
PFQ	(England) S Vendy	15	9
(Netherlands) N Fransman	14	13
6	(Ukraine) D Zavadsky	21	21

Second round
Q4	(Germany) G Firdaus	9	17
11	(France) L Corvée	21	21
(Finland) K Lehikoinen	15	7
6	(Ukraine) D Zavadsky	21	21

Third round
11	(France) L Corvée	22	17	17
6	(Ukraine) D Zavadsky	20	21	21

==== Section 8 ====
First round
Q5	(England) A Marritt	21	17	23
(Wales) D Font	11	21	21
(England) S Parsons	19	21
13	(Denmark) C Thomsen	21	23
(Russia) A Ivanov	10	22	14
Q3	(England) B Beckman	21	20	21
(Germany) S Schoettler	18	19
2	(Sweden) H Hurskainen	21	21

Second round
Q5	(England) A Marritt	14	9
13	(Denmark) C Thomsen	21	21
Q3	(England) B Beckman	18	21	17
2	(Sweden) H Hurskainen	21	19	21

Third round
13	(Denmark) C Thomsen	21	14	15
2	(Sweden) H Hurskainen	18	21	21

== Women's singles ==
=== Seeds ===
1. (Spain) Carolina Marín (champion)
2. (Scotland) Kirsty Gilmour (final)
3. (Bulgaria) Petya Nedelcheva (second round)
4. (Spain) Beatriz Corrales (semi-final)
5. (Czech Republic) Kristina Gavnholt (quarter-final)
6. (France) Sashina Vignes Waran (quarter-final)
7. (Bulgaria) Linda Zechiri (quarter-final)
8. (United States) Jamie Subandhi (first round)

=== Finals ===
Semifinals
1	(Spain) Carolina Marín	21	21
(Denmark) Sandra-Maria Jensen	15	19
4	(Spain) Beatriz Corrales	10	21	16
2	(Scotland) Kirsty Gilmour	21	17	21

Final
1	(Spain) Carolina Marín	21	11	21
2	(Scotland) Kirsty Gilmour	14	21	13

=== Top half ===
==== Section 1 ====
First round
1	(Spain) C Marín	20	21	21
Q4	(Denmark) M Poulsen	22	17	16
(Australia) T Pilven	6	8
(Republic of Ireland) C Magee	21	21
5	(Czech Republic) K Gavnholt	21	15	21
(Netherlands) S Eijbergen	16	21	16
(France) P Le Buhanic	8	21	21
(Russia) T Bibik	21	15	13

Second round
1	(Spain) C Marín	21	22
(Republic of Ireland) C Magee	15	20
5	(Czech Republic) K Gavnholt	21	21
(France) P Le Buhanic	8	11

Quarterfinals
1	(Spain) C Marín	21	21
5	(Czech Republic) K Gavnholt	12	16

==== Section 2 ====
First round
3	(Bulgaria) P Nedelcheva	21	12	22
(Germany) K Schnaase	18	21	20
(Nigeria) G Gabriel	12	7
(England) F Chapman	21	21
8	(United States) J Subandhi	10	12
(Denmark) S Jensen	21	21
(New Zealand) M Chan Ky	21	21
Q1	(Sweden) J Wan	17	19

Second round
3	(Bulgaria) P Nedelcheva	16	16
(England) F Chapman	21	21
(Denmark) S Jensen	20	21	23
(New Zealand) M Chan Ky	22	9	21

Quarterfinals
(England) F Chapman	21	21	11
(Denmark) S Jensen	23	19	21

=== Bottom half ===
==== Section 3 ====
First round
(England) S Walker	21	21
(New Zealand) A Rankin	10	12
(England) P Riou	14	8
6	(France) S Vignes Waran	21	21
(Chinese Taipei) Chang Y-l	10	21	19
Q3	(Russia) A Chervaykova	21	13	21
(Denmark) L Kjaersfeldt	20	17
4	(Spain) B Corrales	22	21

Second round
(England) S Walker	15	18
6	(France) S Vignes Waran	21	21
Q3	(Russia) A Chervaykova	20	12
4	(Spain) B Corrales	22	21

Quarterfinals
6	(France) S Vignes Waran	21	20	13
4	(Spain) B Corrales	19	22	21

==== Section 4 ====
First round
Q2	(Finland) N Vainio	12	21	17
(England) N Cerfontyne	21	18	21
PFQ	(Estonia) G Saar	9	12
7	(Bulgaria) L Zechiri	21	21
(Switzerland) S Jaquet	12	12
(United States) Zhang BW	21	21
(Czech Republic) Z Pavelkova	10	8
2	(Scotland) K Gilmour	21	21

Second round
(England) N Cerfontyne	10	20
7	(Bulgaria) L Zechiri	21	22
(United States) Zhang BW	20	21	20
2	(Scotland) K Gilmour	22	12	22

Quarterfinals
7	(Bulgaria) L Zechiri	10	9
2	(Scotland) K Gilmour	21	21

== Men's doubles ==
=== Seeds ===
1. (England) Chris Langridge / Peter Mills (quarter-final)
2. (Poland) Łukasz Moreń / Wojciech Szkudlarczyk (second round)
3. (Poland) Adam Cwalina / Przemysław Wacha (semi-final)
4. (England) Marcus Ellis / (Scotland) Paul van Rietvelde (withdrew)
5. (Denmark) Mads Conrad-Petersen / Mads Pieler Kolding (champion)
6. (Denmark) Anders Skaarup Rasmussen / Kim Astrup Sorensen (final)
7. (Netherlands) Jacco Arends / Jelle Maas (quarter-final)
8. (United States) Phillip Chew / Sattawat Pongnairat (first round)

=== Finals ===
Semifinals

Final

5
- (Denmark) Mads Conrad-Petersen
- (Denmark) Mads Pieler Kolding

3
- (Poland) Adam Cwalina
- (Poland) Przemysław Wacha
wo

5
- (Denmark) Mads Conrad-Petersen
- (Denmark) Mads Pieler Kolding

6
- (Denmark) Anders Skaarup Rasmussen
- (Denmark) Kim Astrup Sorensen
wo

6
- (Denmark) Anders Skaarup Rasmussen
- (Denmark) Kim Astrup Sorensen
21
21

- (Scotland) Robert Blair
- (Malaysia) Tan Bin Shen
19
19

=== Top half ===
==== Section 1 ====
First round

Second round

Quarterfinals

1
- (England) C Langridge
- (England) P Mills
21
21

PFQ
- (Germany) F Holzer
- (Germany) M Lamsfuss
20
15

1
- (England) C Langridge
- (England) P Mills
21
21

Q3
- (England) N Hodgson
- (England) A Wainwright
5
17

Q4
- (France) L Claerbout
- (France) T Rouxel
22
21
16

Q3
- (England) N Hodgson
- (England) A Wainwright
24
18
21

1
- (England) C Langridge
- (England) P Mills
16
21
9

5
- (Denmark) M Conrad-Petersen
- (Denmark) M Kolding
21
17
21

5
- (Denmark) M Conrad-Petersen
- (Denmark) M Kolding

- (Malaysia) S Misbun
- (Malaysia) R Rahmat
wo

5
- (Denmark) M Conrad-Petersen
- (Denmark) M Kolding
21
21

- (France) B Kersaudy
- (France) G Mittelheisser
14
10

- (France) B Kersaudy
- (France) G Mittelheisser
16
21
21

- (Scotland) Ma Campbell
- (Scotland) P MacHugh
21
13
16

==== Section 2 ====
First round

Second round

Quarterfinals

3
- (Poland) A Cwalina
- (Poland) P Wacha
21
21

- (Scotland) Mi Campbell
- (Wales) D Font
5
12

3
- (Poland) A Cwalina
- (Poland) P Wacha
20
21
21

- (England) G Fox
- (England) T Wolfenden
22
11
9

- (England) G Fox
- (England) T Wolfenden
21
21

- (Germany) D Benz
- (Malaysia) Chan KB
15
13

3
- (Poland) A Cwalina
- (Poland) P Wacha
21
21

- (Australia) R Tam
- (Australia) G Warfe
11
15

8
- (United States) P Chew
- (United States) S Pongnairat
15
17

- (Australia) R Tam
- (Australia) G Warfe
21
21

- (Australia) R Tam
- (Australia) G Warfe
21
21

- (England) P Briggs
- (England) H Towler
9
16

- (England) P Briggs
- (England) H Towler
21
20
21

- (France) B Careme
- (France) R Labar
18
22
16

=== Bottom half ===
==== Section 3 ====
First round

Second round

Quarterfinals

- (Australia) R Middleton
- (Australia) R Smith
21
22

Q2
- (England) D Adamson
- (England) O Baczala
13
20

- (Australia) R Middleton
- (Australia) R Smith
11
19

6
- (Denmark) A Rasmussen
- (Denmark) K Sorensen
21
21

(Scotland) J Neil
(Scotland) B Torrance
13
9

6
- (Denmark) A Rasmussen
- (Denmark) K Sorensen
21
21

6
- (Denmark) A Rasmussen
- (Denmark) K Sorensen
21
19
21

PFQ
- (Sweden) F Myhren
- (Sweden) N Ruponen
11
21
13

- (Germany) R Beck
- (Germany) T Wadenka
21
21

Q1
- (Germany) J Persson
- (Germany) A Trisnanto
19
19

- (Germany) R Beck
- (Germany) T Wadenka
21
9
17

PFQ
- (Sweden) F Myhren
- (Sweden) N Ruponen
17
21
21

- (France) L Corvée
- (France) B Leverdez
19
17

PFQ
- (Sweden) F Myhren
- (Sweden) N Ruponen
21
21

==== Section 4 ====
First round

Second round

Quarterfinals

- (England) B Stawski
- (England) S Williams
14
16

- (Australia) M Chau
- (Australia) S Serasinghe
21
21

- (Australia) M Chau
- (Australia) S Serasinghe
12
13

7
- (Netherlands) J Arends
- (Netherlands) J Maas
21
21

- (Belgium) M Dierickx
- (Belgium) F Golinski
17
17

7
- (Netherlands) J Arends
- (Netherlands) J Maas
21
21

7
- (Netherlands) J Arends
- (Netherlands) J Maas
15
21
18

- (Scotland) R Blair
- (Malaysia) Tan BS
21
8
21

- (Scotland) R Blair
- (Malaysia) Tan BS
21
21

PFQ
- (Republic of Ireland) J Dolan
- (Republic of Ireland) S Magee
14
18

- (Scotland) R Blair
- (Malaysia) Tan BS
21
17
21

2
- (Poland) L Moreń
- (Poland) W Szkudlarczyk
16
21
16

- (Austria) J Koch
- (Denmark) C Thomsen
13
14

2
- (Poland) L Moreń
- (Poland) W Szkudlarczyk
21
21

== Women's doubles ==
=== Seeds ===
1. (Scotland) Imogen Bankier / (Bulgaria) Petya Nedelcheva (semi-final)
2. (Scotland) Jillie Cooper / Kirsty Gilmour (second round)
3. (England) Heather Olver / Kate Robertshaw (quarter-final)
4. (Malaysia) Ng Hui Ern / Ng Hui Lin (final)

=== Finals ===
Semifinals

Final

1
- (Scotland) Imogen Bankier
- (Bulgaria) Petya Nedelcheva
19
22

- (Netherlands) Eefje Muskens
- (Netherlands) Selena Piek
21
24

- (Netherlands) Eefje Muskens
- (Netherlands) Selena Piek
25
15
21

4
- (Malaysia) Ng Hui Ern
- (Malaysia) Ng Hui Lin
23
21
16

4
- (Malaysia) Ng Hui Ern
- (Malaysia) Ng Hui Lin
21
19

- (Indonesia) Keshya Nurvita Hanadia
- (Indonesia) Devi Tika Permatasari
10
13^{r}

=== Top half ===
==== Section 1 ====
First round

Second round

Quarterfinals

1
- (Scotland) I Bankier
- (Bulgaria) P Nedelcheva

BYE

1
- (Scotland) I Bankier
- (Bulgaria) P Nedelcheva
21
21

- (Denmark) L Grebak
- (Denmark) M Helsbol
8
16

- (Russia) I Khlebko
- (Russia) K Polikarpova
wo

- (Denmark) L Grebak
- (Denmark) M Helsbol

1
- (Scotland) I Bankier
- (Bulgaria) P Nedelcheva
21
21

- (Australia) Tang HT
- (Australia) R Veeran
18
14

- (France) P Le Buhanic
- (France) A Tran
21
15
18

- (Belgium) S Annys
- (Belgium) S Corvilain
19
21
21

- (Belgium) S Annys
- (Belgium) S Corvilain
11
14

- (Australia) Tang HT
- (Australia) R Veeran
21
21

- (Australia) Tang HT
- (Australia) R Veeran
21
21

- (France) A Fontaine
- (France) E Lefel
5
7

==== Section 2 ====
First round

Second round

Quarterfinals

3
- (England) H Olver
- (England) K Robertshaw

BYE

3
- (England) H Olver
- (England) K Robertshaw
21
21

- (Russia) A Chervaykova
- (Russia) N Vislova
10
16

- (Russia) A Chervaykova
- (Russia) N Vislova
21
21

- (Scotland) R Findlay
- (Scotland) C Pringle
11
10

3
- (England) H Olver
- (England) K Robertshaw
16
17

- (Netherlands) E Muskens
- (Netherlands) S Piek
21
21

- (England) S Brown
- (England) E Westwood
21
21

- (New Zealand) A Rankin
- (New Zealand) M Stapleton
13
10

- (England) S Brown
- (England) E Westwood
15
13

- (Netherlands) E Muskens
- (Netherlands) S Piek
21
21

- (Netherlands) E Muskens
- (Netherlands) S Piek
21
21

- (England) I Banerjee
- (England) J Pugh
12
9

=== Bottom half ===
==== Section 3 ====
First round

Second round

Quarterfinals

- (England) J Moore
- (England) V Williams
14
14

- (Russia) T Bibik
- (Russia) E Bolotova
21
21

- (Russia) T Bibik
- (Russia) E Bolotova
21
21

- (Australia) J Guan
- (Australia) G Somerville
9
15

- (Scotland) M Richardson
- (England) K Scott
20
4

- (Australia) J Guan
- (Australia) G Somerville
22
21

- (Russia) T Bibik
- (Russia) E Bolotova
12
12

4
- (Malaysia) Ng HE
- (Malaysia) Ng HL
21
21

- (England) C Birch
- (England) A Lim
21
21

- (Switzerland) A Husser
- (Switzerland) S Jaquet
15
15

- (England) C Birch
- (England) A Lim
21
8
13

4
- (Malaysia) Ng HE
- (Malaysia) Ng HL
15
21
21

- (England) E Jeffs
- (England) B Miller
17
11

4
- (Malaysia) Ng HE
- (Malaysia) Ng HL
21
21

==== Section 4 ====
First round

Second round

Quarterfinals

- (Germany) K Kattenbeck
- (Germany) F Volkmann
15
7

- (England) A Langley
- (England) H Lewczynska
21
21

- (England) A Langley
- (England) H Lewczynska
21
21

- (France) L Baumann
- (France) T Vignes Waran
16
14

- (England) L Anindita
- (Germany) M Jolly
13
7

- (France) L Baumann
- (France) T Vignes Waran
21
21

- (England) A Langley
- (England) H Lewczynska
15
9

- (Indonesia) K Hanadia
- (Indonesia) D Permatasari
21
21

- (Sweden) L Eriksson
- (Sweden) A Hogstrom
wo

- (Indonesia) K Hanadia
- (Indonesia) D Permatasari

- (Indonesia) K Hanadia
- (Indonesia) D Permatasari
21
21

2
- (Scotland) J Cooper
- (Scotland) K Gilmour
5
11

BYE

2
- (Scotland) J Cooper
- (Scotland) K Gilmour

== Mixed doubles ==
=== Seeds ===
1. (England) Chris Langridge / Heather Olver (final)
2. (United States) Phillip Chew / Jamie Subandhi (second round)
3. (Denmark) Anders Skaarup Rasmussen / Lena Grebak (quarter-final)
4. (Sweden) Nico Ruponen / Amanda Hogstrom (second round)
5. (Scotland) Robert Blair / Imogen Bankier (champion)
6. (Netherlands) Jacco Arends / Selena Piek (semi-final)
7. (Republic of Ireland) Sam Magee / Chloe Magee (quarter-final)
8. (Australia) Ross Smith / Renuga Veeran (second round)

=== Finals ===
Semifinals

Final

1
- (England) Chris Langridge
- (England) Heather Olver
21
21

- (France) Ronan Labar
- (France) Emilie Lefel
18
18

1
- (England) Chris Langridge
- (England) Heather Olver
16
14

5
- (Scotland) Robert Blair
- (Scotland) Imogen Bankier
21
21

6
- (Netherlands) Jacco Arends
- (Netherlands) Selena Piek
13
16

5
- (Scotland) Robert Blair
- (Scotland) Imogen Bankier
21
21

=== Top half ===
==== Section 1 ====
First round

Second round

Quarterfinals

1
- (England) C Langridge
- (England) H Olver
21
21

- (Scotland) P MacHugh
- (Scotland) C Pringle
11
10

1
- (England) C Langridge
- (England) H Olver
21
21

Q3
- (England) O Baczala
- (England) V Williams
10
14

Q1
- (Scotland) A Hall
- (Scotland) M Richardson
22
18

Q3
- (England) O Baczala
- (England) V Williams
24
21

1
- (England) C Langridge
- (England) H Olver
21
21

- (England) C Coles
- (England) A Lim
13
15

8
- (Australia) R Smith
- (Australia) R Veeran
21
15
21

- (Russia) A Ashmarin
- (Russia) E Bolotova
17
21
10

8
- (Australia) R Smith
- (Australia) R Veeran
18
19

- (England) C Coles
- (England) A Lim
21
21

- (Netherlands) J Maas
- (Netherlands) I Tabeling
21
18
17

- (England) C Coles
- (England) A Lim
14
21
21

==== Section 2 ====
First round

Second round

Quarterfinals

3
- (Sweden) N Ruponen
- (Sweden) A Hogstrom
21
23

Q2
- (Germany) A Trisnanto
- (Germany) M Jolly
19
21

3
- (Sweden) N Ruponen
- (Sweden) A Hogstrom
20
14

- (France) R Labar
- (France) E Lefel
22
21

- (France) R Labar
- (France) E Lefel
21
24

- (England) B Stawski
- (England) A Langley
15
22

- (France) R Labar
- (France) E Lefel
13
21
21

7
- (Republic of Ireland) S Magee
- (Republic of Ireland) C Magee
21
17
18

7
- (Republic of Ireland) S Magee
- (Republic of Ireland) C Magee
21
21

- (England) G Fox
- (England) S Brown
17
9

7
- (Republic of Ireland) S Magee
- (Republic of Ireland) C Magee

- (Denmark) K Sorensen
- (Denmark) M Helsbol
wo

Q4
- (Scotland) M Campbell
- (Scotland) J Cooper
19
24
15

- (Denmark) K Sorensen
- (Denmark) M Helsbol
21
22
21

=== Bottom half ===
==== Section 3 ====
First round

Second round

Quarterfinals

- (Australia) M Chau
- (Australia) J Guan
16
13

- (France) G Mittelheisser
- (France) A Fontaine
21
21

- (France) G Mittelheisser
- (France) A Fontaine
10
11

6
- (Netherlands) J Arends
- (Netherlands) S Piek
21
21

PFQ
- (Sweden) F Myhren
- (Sweden) A Wallin
6
7

6
- (Netherlands) J Arends
- (Netherlands) S Piek
21
21

6
- (Netherlands) J Arends
- (Netherlands) S Piek
21
21

3
- (Denmark) A Rasmussen
- (Denmark) L Grebak
17
15

- (Australia) R Tam
- (Australia) G Somerville
14
16

- (Sweden) J Nordh
- (Sweden) E Lennartsson
21
21

- (Sweden) J Nordh
- (Sweden) E Lennartsson
13
15

3
- (Denmark) A Rasmussen
- (Denmark) L Grebak
21
21

- (Germany) R Beck
- (Germany) K Kattenbeck
14
6

3
- (Denmark) A Rasmussen
- (Denmark) L Grebak
21
21

==== Section 4 ====
First round

Second round

Quarterfinals

- (France) B Kersaudy
- (France) T Vignes Waran
21
17
17

- (Australia) R Middleton
- (Australia) Tang HT
16
21
21

- (Australia) R Middleton
- (Australia) Tang HT
wo

5
- (Scotland) R Blair
- (Scotland) I Bankier

- (France) B Careme
- (France) A Tran
13
21
9

5
- (Scotland) R Blair
- (Scotland) I Bankier
21
17
21

5
- (Scotland) R Blair
- (Scotland) I Bankier
21
21

- (Poland) R Mateusiak
- (Poland) A Wojtkowska
14
19

- (Belgium) F Golinski
- (Belgium) S Corvilain
15
5

- (Poland) R Mateusiak
- (Poland) A Wojtkowska
21
21

- (Poland) R Mateusiak
- (Poland) A Wojtkowska
16
21
21

2
- (United States) P Chew
- (United States) J Subandhi
21
14
11

- (England) D Adamson
- (England) E Jeffs
11
11

2
- (United States) P Chew
- (United States) J Subandhi
21
21

Preceded by 2013 Korea Open Grand Prix Gold	BWF Grand Prix Gold and Grand Prix; 2013 season	Succeeded by 2013 Macau Open Grand Prix Gold
