= 2017 Malaysia Masters Grand Prix Gold =

Tournament details
- Dates: 17 – 22 January 2017
- Level: Grand Prix Gold
- Total prize money: US$120,000
- Venue: Sibu Indoor Stadium
- Location: Sibu, Sarawak, Malaysia

Champions
- Men's singles: (Hong Kong) Ng Ka Long
- Women's singles: (India) Saina Nehwal
- Men's doubles: (Indonesia) Berry Angriawan (Indonesia) Hardianto
- Women's doubles: (Thailand) Jongkolphan Kititharakul (Thailand) Rawinda Prajongjai
- Mixed doubles: (Malaysia) Tan Kian Meng (Malaysia) Lai Pei Jing

The 2017 Malaysia Masters Grand Prix Gold was the first grand prix's badminton tournament of the 2017 BWF Grand Prix Gold and Grand Prix. The tournament was held at the Sibu Indoor Stadium in Sarawak, Malaysia from 17–22 January 2017 and had a total purse of $120,000.

== Men's singles ==
=== Seeds ===
1. (Hong Kong) Ng Ka Long (champion)
2. (Thailand) Tanongsak Saensomboonsuk (withdrew)
3. (Hong Kong) Hu Yun (second round)
4. (Hong Kong) Wong Wing Ki (withdrew)
5. (South Korea) Lee Hyun-il (final)
6. (India) Ajay Jayaram (quarterfinals)
7. (Indonesia) Tommy Sugiarto (semifinals)
8. (Indonesia) Jonatan Christie (quarterfinals)
9. (Malaysia) Iskandar Zulkarnain Zainuddin (withdrew)
10. (Hong Kong) Wei Nan (first round)
11. (Indonesia) Sony Dwi Kuncoro (first round)
12. (Chinese Taipei) Wang Tzu-wei (second round)
13. (Malaysia) Zulfadli Zulkiffli (second round)
14. (France) Brice Leverdez (second round)
15. (India) B. Sai Praneeth (withdrew)
16. (Indonesia) Ihsan Maulana Mustofa (third round)

=== Finals ===
Quarterfinals
1	(Hong Kong) Ng Ka Long	13	21	21
8	(Indonesia) Jonatan Christie	21	15	16
(Indonesia) Anthony Sinisuka Ginting	21	21
6	(India) Ajay Jayaram	13	8
7	(Indonesia) Tommy Sugiarto	21	21
(Indonesia) Wisnu Yuli Prasetyo	15	9
5	(South Korea) Lee Hyun-il	21	21
(Indonesia) Muhammad Bayu Pangisthu	10	15

Semifinals
1	(Hong Kong) Ng Ka Long	21	21
(Indonesia) Anthony Sinisuka Ginting	18	15
7	(Indonesia) Tommy Sugiarto	17	16
5	(South Korea) Lee Hyun-il	21	21

Final
1	(Hong Kong) Ng Ka Long	14	21	10
5	(South Korea) Lee Hyun-il	21	15	9^{r}

=== Top half ===
==== Section 1 ====
First Round
1	(Hong Kong) Ng K L	21	21
(Indonesia) N E Sulistyo	15	7
(Malaysia) Chiang J S	13	12
(Ukraine) A Pochtarov	21	21
16	(Indonesia) I M Mustofa	21	21
Q6	(Malaysia) W M H Wan Hassan	9	4
(India) H Dani	21	21
(Malaysia) Lee Z J	19	17

Second Round
1	(Hong Kong) Ng K L	21	21
(Ukraine) A Pochtarov	19	12
16	(Indonesia) I M Mustofa	21	17	21
(India) H Dani	15	21	13

Third Round
1	(Hong Kong) Ng K L	21	21
16	(Indonesia) I M Mustofa	14	14

==== Section 2 ====
First Round
8	(Indonesia) J Christie	21	21
(Malaysia) Lim C W	19	13
Q7	(Indonesia) I S Yulianto	6	11
(Malaysia) Goh G C	21	21
10	(Hong Kong) Wei N	8	19
(Indonesia) S H Rhustavito	21	21
Q1	(Malaysia) M R Veerappen	5	4
(Malaysia) Chong Y H	21	21

Second Round
8	(Indonesia) J Christie	21	21
(Malaysia) Goh G C	14	11
(Indonesia) S H Rhustavito	21	21
(Malaysia) Chong Y H	14	15

Third Round
8	(Indonesia) J Christie	24	21
(Indonesia) S H Rhustavito	22	16

==== Section 3 ====
First Round
PFQ	(Indonesia) A Yunus	12	17
(Malaysia) Satheishtharan R.	21	21
(Indonesia) A S Ginting	26	21	21
(Thailand) K Phetpradab	28	10	12
11	(Indonesia) S D Kuncoro	21	6	9
(Malaysia) Chong W F	12	21	21
(Indonesia) K H Wibowo	21	21
(Thailand) A Namkul	15	19

Second Round
(Malaysia) Satheishtharan R.	14	14
(Indonesia) A S Ginting	21	21
(Malaysia) Chong W F	21	21
(Indonesia) K H Wibowo	15	9

Third Round
(Indonesia) A S Ginting	21	23
(Malaysia) Chong W F	15	21

==== Section 4 ====
First Round
6	(India) A Jayaram	21	17	21
Q4	(Malaysia) Leong J H	10	21	14
Q3	(Indonesia) D H Rumbaka	21	14	10
PFQ	(Indonesia) V A Saputra	16	21	21
13	(Malaysia) Zf Zulkiffli	21	21
(India) A Yelegar	13	14
(Chinese Taipei) Hsueh H-y	21	21
(India) R Y Chittaboina	16	11

Second Round
6	(India) A Jayaram	21	21
PFQ	(Indonesia) V A Saputra	9	12
13	(Malaysia) Zf Zulkiffli	21	18	12
(Chinese Taipei) Hsueh H-y	19	21	21

Third Round
6	(India) A Jayaram	21	15	21
(Chinese Taipei) Hsueh H-y	12	21	15

=== Bottom half ===
==== Section 5 ====
First Round
(Hong Kong) Lee C Y	21	21
(Indonesia) F A Kholik	13	17
(Malaysia) Zh Zulkiffli	4	4^{r}
14	(France) B Leverdez	21	11
(India) P Joshi	15	21	24
(Singapore) R Ng	21	16	22
Q5	(Malaysia) Vincent Phuah C W	3	10
7	(Indonesia) T Sugiarto	21	21

Second Round
(Hong Kong) Lee C Y	21	21
14	(France) B Leverdez	15	18
(India) P Joshi	9	27
7	(Indonesia) T Sugiarto	21	29

Third Round
(Hong Kong) Lee C Y	10	17
7	(Indonesia) T Sugiarto	21	21

==== Section 6 ====
First Round
(Thailand) P Thongnuam	21	18	21
(India) S Verma	10	21	17
(Thailand) S Avihingsanon	15	19
12	(Chinese Taipei) Wang T-w	21	21
(India) A Joshi	20	18
(Indonesia) W Y Prasetyo	22	21
(Indonesia) A Marteen	21	15	14
3	(Hong Kong) Hu Y	16	21	21

Second Round
(Thailand) P Thongnuam	21	21
12	(Chinese Taipei) Wang T-w	16	19
(Indonesia) W Y Prasetyo	21	21
3	(Hong Kong) Hu Y	15	13

Third Round
(Thailand) P Thongnuam	8^{r}
(Indonesia) W Y Prasetyo	14

==== Section 7 ====
First Round
(Chinese Taipei) Chen C-w	21	25
(Malaysia) Tan C S	17	23
(India) H M.Gowda	21	21
PFQ	(Indonesia) Y F Mainaky	14	15
(Indonesia) P A Sudrajat	14	15
(Malaysia) Soong J V	21	21
Q8	(Malaysia) Sim F H	7	13
5	(South Korea) Lee H-i	21	21

Second Round
(Chinese Taipei) Chen C-w	21	21
(India) H M.Gowda	5	19
(Malaysia) Soong J V	12	10
5	(South Korea) Lee H-i	21	21

Third Round
(Chinese Taipei) Chen C-w	14	7
5	(South Korea) Lee H-i	21	21

==== Section 8 ====
First Round
Q2	(Indonesia) A Yunanto	22	15
PFQ	(Malaysia) Tan J W	24	21
(Malaysia) Cheam J W	21	21
PFQ	(United States) Y T Chan	7	6
(Malaysia) Soo T Z	8	21	18
(Indonesia) M B Pangisthu	21	15	21
(Indonesia) F I Hadmadi	21	21
PFQ	(Brunei) Jaspar Yu W C	12	19

Second Round
PFQ	(Malaysia) Tan J W	20	21	21
(Malaysia) Cheam J W	22	10	13
(Indonesia) M B Pangisthu	14	21	21
(Indonesia) F I Hadmadi	21	14	13

Third Round
PFQ	(Malaysia) Tan J W	18	10
(Indonesia) M B Pangisthu	21	21

== Women's singles ==
=== Seeds ===
1. (India) Saina Nehwal (champion)
2. (Hong Kong) Cheung Ngan Yi (semifinals)
3. (Spain) Beatriz Corrales (second round)
4. (Chinese Taipei) Hsu Ya-ching (second round)
5. (Hong Kong) Yip Pui Yin (semifinals)
6. (Malaysia) Goh Jin Wei (second round)
7. (Chinese Taipei) Chiang Mei-hui (second round)
8. (Indonesia) Fitriani (quarterfinals)

=== Finals ===
Semifinals
1	(India) Saina Nehwal	21	21
5	(Hong Kong) Yip Pui Yin	13	10
(Thailand) Pornpawee Chochuwong	21	20	21
2	(Hong Kong) Cheung Ngan Yi	19	22	18

Final
1	(India) Saina Nehwal	22	22
(Thailand) Pornpawee Chochuwong	20	20

=== Top half ===
==== Section 1 ====
First Round
1	(India) S Nehwal	21	21
Q1	(Thailand) C Korepap	9	8
(Indonesia) H Ramadini	21	21
(Singapore) Yeo J M	16	17
8	(Indonesia) Fitriani	21	21
(Malaysia) Ho Y M	17	13
Q4	(Malaysia) Thinaah M.	21	10	10
(Malaysia) Soniia Cheah S Y	19	21	21

Second Round
1	(India) S Nehwal	21	21
(Indonesia) H Ramadini	17	12
8	(Indonesia) Fitriani	21	21
(Malaysia) Soniia Cheah S Y	16	17

Quarterfinals
1	(India) S Nehwal	21	21
8	(Indonesia) Fitriani	15	14

==== Section 2 ====
First Round
4	(Chinese Taipei) Hsu Y-c	8	21	21
(Indonesia) Y Y Susanto	21	18	17
(Malaysia) Lee Y Y	21	21
(Indonesia) L A Mainaky	11	18
5	(Hong Kong) Yip P Y	21	21
(Indonesia) S Fatmawati	17	15
(Russia) N Perminova	12	16
(Indonesia) F Angguni	21	21

Second Round
4	(Chinese Taipei) Hsu Y-c	8	8
(Malaysia) Lee Y Y	21	21
5	(Hong Kong) Yip P Y	13	21	21
(Indonesia) F Angguni	21	13	17

Quarterfinals
(Malaysia) Lee Y Y	18	16
5	(Hong Kong) Yip P Y	21	21

=== Bottom half ===
==== Section 3 ====
First Round
(Indonesia) R Hartawan	12	21	11
(Thailand) P Chochuwong	21	16	21
PFQ	(Indonesia) J Muljati	21	14
7	(Chinese Taipei) Chiang M-h	23	21
Q2	(Indonesia) A Rovita	16	11
(Indonesia) D D Ayustine	21	21
Q3	(Malaysia) Kisona S.	15	13
3	(Spain) B Corrales	21	21

Second Round
(Thailand) P Chochuwong	21	22
7	(Chinese Taipei) Chiang M-h	8	20
(Indonesia) D D Ayustine	21	19	22
3	(Spain) B Corrales	16	21	20

Quarterfinals
(Thailand) P Chochuwong	21	21
(Indonesia) D D Ayustine	10	17

==== Section 4 ====
First Round
(Indonesia) A D Widyaningrum	21	14	18
(Chinese Taipei) Lee C-h	15	21	21
(India) S K P Kudaravalli	12	21
6	(Malaysia) Goh J W	21	23
(Malaysia) Lim Y F	21	21
(Indonesia) R A Riodingin	19	16
(Indonesia) G M Tunjung	21	18	16
2	(Hong Kong) Cheung N Y	15	21	21

Second Round
(Chinese Taipei) Lee C-h	21	21
6	(Malaysia) Goh J W	12	10
(Malaysia) Lim Y F	13	11
2	(Hong Kong) Cheung N Y	21	21

Quarterfinals
(Chinese Taipei) Lee C-h	16	21	7
2	(Hong Kong) Cheung N Y	21	19	21

== Men's doubles ==
=== Seeds ===
1. (Malaysia) Goh V Shem / Tan Wee Kiong (withdrew)
2. (Chinese Taipei) Lee Jhe-huei / Lee Yang (first round)
3. (India) Manu Attri / B. Sumeeth Reddy (second round)
4. (Indonesia) Fajar Alfian / Muhammad Rian Ardianto (second round)
5. (Malaysia) Ong Yew Sin / Teo Ee Yi (withdrew)
6. (Malaysia) Chooi Kah Ming / Low Juan Shen (first round)
7. (Hong Kong) Or Chin Chung / Tang Chun Man (first round)
8. (Malaysia) Hoon Thien How / Teo Kok Siang (second round)

=== Finals ===
Semifinals
(Malaysia) Goh Sze Fei (Malaysia) Nur Izzuddin	21	21
(Indonesia) Hendra Aprida Gunawan (Indonesia) Markis Kido	15	13
PFQ	(Japan) Hiroyuki Endo (Japan) Yuta Watanabe	20	19
(Indonesia) Berry Angriawan (Indonesia) Hardianto	22	21

Final
(Malaysia) Goh Sze Fei (Malaysia) Nur Izzuddin	19	12
(Indonesia) Berry Angriawan (Indonesia) Hardianto	21	21

=== Top half ===
==== Section 1 ====
First Round
PFQ	(Hong Kong) Mak H C (Hong Kong) Tam C H	21	21	21
Q2	(Indonesia) L A Nugroho (Indonesia) T Supriadi	15	23	8
(Malaysia) Tan C T (Malaysia) Tan W G	11	21	26
(India) S Rankireddy (India) C Shetty	21	15	24
7	(Hong Kong) Or C C (Hong Kong) Tang C M	21	18	18
(Malaysia) Goh S F (Malaysia) N Izzuddin	16	21	21
(Chinese Taipei) Lu C-y (Chinese Taipei) Yang P-h	23	15	21
(Malaysia) M A Abdul Latif (Malaysia) Lim K W	21	21	15

Second Round
PFQ	(Hong Kong) Mak H C (Hong Kong) Tam C H	21	21
(Malaysia) Tan C T (Malaysia) Tan W G	15	19
(Malaysia) Goh S F (Malaysia) N Izzuddin	13	21	21
(Chinese Taipei) Lu C-y (Chinese Taipei) Yang P-h	21	12	13

Quarterfinals
PFQ	(Hong Kong) Mak H C (Hong Kong) Tam C H	20	16
(Malaysia) Goh S F (Malaysia) N Izzuddin	22	21

==== Section 2 ====
First Round
3	(India) M Attri (India) B. S Reddy	15	21	21
Q4	(Malaysia) Chen J H (Malaysia) Shia C K	21	13	18
(Indonesia) H A Gunawan (Indonesia) M Kido	21	21
(Indonesia) A Adistia (Malaysia) Ian Wong J S	14	16
8	(Malaysia) Hoon T H (Malaysia) Teo K S	21	21
Q3	(Malaysia) A Chia (Malaysia) Tan J H	17	16
(Chinese Taipei) Lee S-m (Chinese Taipei) Lin C-y	19	22
(Singapore) Terry Hee Y K (Singapore) Loh K H	21	24

Second Round
3	(India) M Attri (India) B. S Reddy	17	21	12
(Indonesia) H A Gunawan (Indonesia) M Kido	21	18	21
8	(Malaysia) Hoon T H (Malaysia) Teo K S	17	0^{r}
(Singapore) Terry Hee Y K (Singapore) Loh K H	21	0

Quarterfinals
(Indonesia) H A Gunawan (Indonesia) M Kido	19	21	21
(Singapore) Terry Hee Y K (Singapore) Loh K H	21	13	11

=== Bottom half ===
==== Section 3 ====
First Round
PFQ	(Japan) H Endo (Japan) Y Watanabe	21	21
Q1	(Indonesia) Y R Sugiarto (Indonesia) A Y Wirawan	10	11
(Chinese Taipei) Lee C-h (Chinese Taipei) Tsai C-h	21	22
PFQ	(Indonesia) S K Gutama (Indonesia) F Wijaya	9	20
(Japan) T Inoue (Japan) Y Kaneko	21	21
(Singapore) D B Chrisnanta (Singapore) H Wijaya	7	9
(Malaysia) Lee J Y (Malaysia) Lim Z T	21	13	17
4	(Indonesia) F Alfian (Indonesia) M R Ardianto	15	21	21

Second Round
PFQ	(Japan) H Endo (Japan) Y Watanabe	21	21
(Chinese Taipei) Lee C-h (Chinese Taipei) Tsai C-h	13	11
(Japan) T Inoue (Japan) Y Kaneko	10	21	21
4	(Indonesia) F Alfian (Indonesia) M R Ardianto	21	11	17

Quarterfinals
PFQ	(Japan) H Endo (Japan) Y Watanabe	21	21
(Japan) T Inoue (Japan) Y Kaneko	16	18

==== Section 4 ====
First Round
(India) Arjun M.R. (India) R Shlok	21	21
(Malaysia) N M A Ayub (Malaysia) J Singh	19	12
(Hong Kong) Law C H (Hong Kong) Lee C H	21	14	21
6	(Malaysia) Chooi K M (Malaysia) Low J S	16	21	15
(India) A Francis (India) T Kona	14	18
(Indonesia) B Angriawan (Indonesia) Hardianto	21	21
(Indonesia) M Ahsan (Indonesia) R A Saputro	20	21	21
2	(Chinese Taipei) Lee J-h (Chinese Taipei) Lee Y	22	15	13

Second Round
(India) Arjun M.R. (India) R Shlok	14	17
(Hong Kong) Law C H (Hong Kong) Lee C H	21	21
(Indonesia) B Angriawan (Indonesia) Hardianto	w	/	o
(Indonesia) M Ahsan (Indonesia) R A Saputro

Quarterfinals
(Hong Kong) Law C H (Hong Kong) Lee C H	21	22	11
(Indonesia) B Angriawan (Indonesia) Hardianto	23	20	21

== Women's doubles ==
=== Seeds ===
1. (Thailand) Jongkolphan Kititharakul / Rawinda Prajongjai (champion)
2. (Chinese Taipei) Chiang Kai-hsin / Hung Shih-han (quarterfinals)
3. (Indonesia) Keshya Nurvita Hanadia / Devi Tika Permatasari (quarterfinals)
4. (Malaysia) Lim Yin Loo / Yap Cheng Wen (semifinals)

=== Finals ===
Semifinals
1	(Thailand) Jongkolphan Kititharakul (Thailand) Rawinda Prajongjai	22	21	21
(Chinese Taipei) Hsu Ya-ching (Chinese Taipei) Wu Ti-jung	24	19	11
4	(Malaysia) Lim Yin Loo (Malaysia) Yap Cheng Wen	20	22	15
(Hong Kong) Poon Lok Yan (Hong Kong) Tse Ying Suet	22	20	21

Final
1	(Thailand) Jongkolphan Kititharakul (Thailand) Rawinda Prajongjai	21	21
(Hong Kong) Poon Lok Yan (Hong Kong) Tse Ying Suet	17	9

=== Top half ===
==== Section 1 ====
First Round
1	(Thailand) J Kititharakul (Thailand) R Prajongjai
BYE
(India) A Ponnappa (India) N. S Reddy
(Malaysia) Goh Y C (Malaysia) Woon K W	w	/	o
(Hong Kong) Ng T Y (Hong Kong) Yeung N T
BYE
(Malaysia) Chow M K (Malaysia) Vivian Hoo K M	21	21
(India) Sruthi K.P (India) H M Harinarayanan	9	13

Second Round
1	(Thailand) J Kititharakul (Thailand) R Prajongjai	21	22
(Malaysia) Goh Y C (Malaysia) Woon K W	16	20
(Hong Kong) Ng T Y (Hong Kong) Yeung N T	9	9
(Malaysia) Chow M K (Malaysia) Vivian Hoo K M	21	21

Quarterfinals
1	(Thailand) J Kititharakul (Thailand) R Prajongjai	21	21
(Malaysia) Chow M K (Malaysia) Vivian Hoo K M	17	11

==== Section 2 ====
First Round
3	(Indonesia) K N Hanadia (Indonesia) D T Permatasari
BYE
(Malaysia) Chin K M (Malaysia) Yap Z	w	/	o
(India) M Aggarwal (India) K. Maneesha
(Indonesia) A M Khasanah (Indonesia) R S Putri
BYE
(Chinese Taipei) Hsu Y-c (Chinese Taipei) Wu T-j	21	21
(Malaysia) Lee M Y (Malaysia) Lim C S	16	17

Second Round
3	(Indonesia) K N Hanadia (Indonesia) D T Permatasari	21	21
(Malaysia) Chin K M (Malaysia) Yap Z	17	15
(Indonesia) A M Khasanah (Indonesia) R S Putri	6	8
(Chinese Taipei) Hsu Y-c (Chinese Taipei) Wu T-j	21	21

Quarterfinals
3	(Indonesia) K N Hanadia (Indonesia) D T Permatasari	8	0^{r}
(Chinese Taipei) Hsu Y-c (Chinese Taipei) Wu T-j	21	0

=== Bottom half ===
==== Section 3 ====
First Round
(Indonesia) R Amelia (Malaysia) Anna Cheong C Y	21	21
(Malaysia) Joyce Choong W C (Malaysia) Lim J L	14	12
(Malaysia) Lim P Y (Malaysia) Lim P Z	14	18
(Singapore) Tan W H (Singapore) C Wong	21	21
(Indonesia) A Rovita (Indonesia) S N Azisah	5	11
(Malaysia) A A Anscelly (Malaysia) Teoh M X	21	21
BYE
4	(Malaysia) Lim Y L (Malaysia) Yap C W

Second Round
(Indonesia) R Amelia (Malaysia) Anna Cheong C Y	16	12
(Singapore) Tan W H (Singapore) C Wong	21	21
(Malaysia) A A Anscelly (Malaysia) Teoh M X	12	11
4	(Malaysia) Lim Y L (Malaysia) Yap C W	21	21

Quarterfinals
(Singapore) Tan W H (Singapore) C Wong	11	11
4	(Malaysia) Lim Y L (Malaysia) Yap C W	21	21

==== Section 4 ====
First Round
(Indonesia) C S Ayunidha (Indonesia) V D Rumete	16	9
(Hong Kong) Poon L Y (Hong Kong) Tse Y S	21	21
BYE
(Indonesia) D Fitriani (Indonesia) N Melati
(India) A Balan (India) P Sawant	21	21
(Indonesia) A F Laili (Indonesia) V A P Lejarsari	10	11
BYE
2	(Chinese Taipei) Chiang K-h (Chinese Taipei) Hung S-h

Second Round
(Hong Kong) Poon L Y (Hong Kong) Tse Y S	21	14	21
(Indonesia) D Fitriani (Indonesia) N Melati	17	21	14
(India) A Balan (India) P Sawant	18	14
2	(Chinese Taipei) Chiang K-h (Chinese Taipei) Hung S-h	21	21

Quarterfinals
(Hong Kong) Poon L Y (Hong Kong) Tse Y S	22	21
2	(Chinese Taipei) Chiang K-h (Chinese Taipei) Hung S-h	20	10

== Mixed doubles ==
=== Seeds ===
1. (Malaysia) Chan Peng Soon / Goh Liu Ying (withdrew)
2. (Malaysia) Tan Kian Meng / Lai Pei Jing (champion)
3. (Hong Kong) Lee Chun Hei / Chau Hoi Wah (withdrew)
4. (Indonesia) Ronald Alexander / Melati Daeva Oktavianti (second round)
5. (Hong Kong) Tang Chun Man / Tse Ying Suet (quarterfinals)
6. (Indonesia) Tontowi Ahmad / Gloria Emanuelle Widjaja (semifinals)
7. (India) Pranaav Jerry Chopra / N. Sikki Reddy (withdrew)
8. (Singapore) Terry Hee / Tan Wei Han (quarterfinals)

=== Finals ===
Semifinals
6	(Indonesia) Tontowi Ahmad (Indonesia) Gloria Emanuelle Widjaja	17	18
(Malaysia) Goh Soon Huat (Malaysia) Shevon Jemie Lai	21	21
(Hong Kong) Tam Chun Hei (Hong Kong) Ng Tsz Yau	21	13	12
2	(Malaysia) Tan Kian Meng (Malaysia) Lai Pei Jing	19	21	21

Final
(Malaysia) Goh Soon Huat (Malaysia) Shevon Jemie Lai	17	9
2	(Malaysia) Tan Kian Meng (Malaysia) Lai Pei Jing	21	21

=== Top half ===
==== Section 1 ====
First Round
PFQ	(Indonesia) M R Fahlepi (Indonesia) A M Khasanah	18	12
(Indonesia) Y F Mainaky (Indonesia) L A Mainaky	21	21
Q3	(Malaysia) Hoo P R (Malaysia) Peck Y W	20	16
(Chinese Taipei) Lin C-y (Chinese Taipei) Wu T-j	22	21
6	(Indonesia) T Ahmad (Indonesia) G E Widjaja	21	21
(India) B. S Reddy (India) A Ponnappa	17	17
(Indonesia) L A Nugroho (Indonesia) R Amelia	19	18
(India) M Attri (India) J Gutta	21	21

Second Round
(Indonesia) Y F Mainaky (Indonesia) L A Mainaky	6	12
(Chinese Taipei) Lin C-y (Chinese Taipei) Wu T-j	21	21
6	(Indonesia) T Ahmad (Indonesia) G E Widjaja	21	21
(India) M Attri (India) J Gutta	18	10

Quarterfinals
(Chinese Taipei) Lin C-y (Chinese Taipei) Wu T-j	12	21	14
6	(Indonesia) T Ahmad (Indonesia) G E Widjaja	21	17	21

==== Section 2 ====
First Round
PFQ	(Indonesia) S Aditha (Indonesia) A F Laili	21	11
(Indonesia) H J P Wibowo (Indonesia) R S Putri	13	8^{r}
(Malaysia) Goh S H (Malaysia) S J Lai	21	21
(Indonesia) T Supriadi (Indonesia) D T Permatasari	19	12
8	(Singapore) T Hee (Singapore) Tan W H	21	21
Q2	(Indonesia) A Y Wirawan (Indonesia) N Melati	9	9
(Malaysia) Y Khrishnan (India) P Sawant	21	22
(Hong Kong) Mak H C (Hong Kong) Yeung N T	14	20

Second Round
PFQ	(Indonesia) S Aditha (Indonesia) A F Laili	7	6
(Malaysia) Goh S H (Malaysia) S J Lai	21	21
8	(Singapore) T Hee (Singapore) Tan W H	21	21
(Malaysia) Y Khrishnan (India) P Sawant	17	17

Quarterfinals
(Malaysia) Goh S H (Malaysia) S J Lai	15	21	21
8	(Singapore) T Hee (Singapore) Tan W H	21	15	13

=== Bottom half ===
==== Section 3 ====
First Round
(India) S Rankireddy (India) K. Maneesha	10	14
(Hong Kong) Tam C H (Hong Kong) Ng T Y	21	21
(Malaysia) Low H Y (Malaysia) Cheah Y S	21	14	17
PFQ	(Indonesia) D Juang (Indonesia) K N Hanadia	11	21	21
(Chinese Taipei) Lee Y (Chinese Taipei) Hsu Y-c	21	21
(Indonesia) T Wardhana (Indonesia) V A P Lejarsari	12	12
Q1	(Malaysia) Chen T J (Malaysia) Tew J J	16	14
4	(Indonesia) R Alexander (Indonesia) M D Oktavianti	21	21

Second Round
(Hong Kong) Tam C H (Hong Kong) Ng T Y	21	21
PFQ	(Indonesia) D Juang (Indonesia) K N Hanadia	13	11
(Chinese Taipei) Lee Y (Chinese Taipei) Hsu Y-c	21	12	24
4	(Indonesia) R Alexander (Indonesia) M D Oktavianti	17	21	22

Quarterfinals
(Hong Kong) Tam C H (Hong Kong) Ng T Y	21	21
(Chinese Taipei) Lee Y (Chinese Taipei) Hsu Y-c	19	17

==== Section 4 ====
First Round
(Singapore) D B Chrisnanta (Singapore) C Wong	21	21
(United States) Y T Chan (United States) Y Kawasaki	3	8
(Indonesia) A Yunanto (Indonesia) S N Azisah	12	10
5	(Hong Kong) Tang C M (Hong Kong) Tse Y S	21	21
Q4	(Malaysia) M A Abdul Latif (Indonesia) R A Riodingin	21	21
(Thailand) P Thongnuam (Thailand) N Saengchote	10	16
(Indonesia) F S Surbakti (Indonesia) C S Ayunidha	8	7
2	(Malaysia) Tan K M (Malaysia) Lai P J	21	21

Second Round
(Singapore) D B Chrisnanta (Singapore) C Wong	17	19
5	(Hong Kong) Tang C M (Hong Kong) Tse Y S	21	21
Q4	(Malaysia) M A Abdul Latif (Indonesia) R A Riodingin	6	12
2	(Malaysia) Tan K M (Malaysia) Lai P J	21	21

Quarterfinals
5	(Hong Kong) Tang C M (Hong Kong) Tse Y S	19	16
2	(Malaysia) Tan K M (Malaysia) Lai P J	21	21

Preceded by 2016 Korea Masters Grand Prix Gold	BWF Grand Prix Gold and Grand Prix; 2017 BWF Season	Succeeded by 2017 Syed Modi International Grand Prix Gold
