= 2014 Indonesia Super Series Premier =

2014 Indonesia Open
Tournament details
- Dates: 17–22 June
- Edition: 33rd
- Level: Super Series Premier
- Total prize money: US$750,000
- Venue: Istora Gelora Bung Karno
- Location: Jakarta, Indonesia

Champions
- Men's singles: (Denmark) Jan Ø. Jørgensen
- Women's singles: (China) Li Xuerui
- Men's doubles: (South Korea) Lee Yong-dae (South Korea) Yoo Yeon-seong
- Women's doubles: (China) Tian Qing (China) Zhao Yunlei
- Mixed doubles: (Denmark) Joachim Fischer Nielsen (Denmark) Christinna Pedersen

The 2014 Indonesia Open was the seventh super series tournament of the 2014 BWF Super Series. The tournament took place in Jakarta, Indonesia from 17 to 22 June 2014 with a total purse of $750,000.

== Men's singles ==
=== Seeds ===
1. (Malaysia) Lee Chong Wei (semifinals)
2. (China) Chen Long (semifinals)
3. (Denmark) Jan Ø. Jørgensen (champions)
4. (Japan) Kenichi Tago (final)
5. (Indonesia) Tommy Sugiarto (first round)
6. (China) Du Pengyu (withdrew)
7. (South Korea) Shon Wan-ho (quarterfinals)
8. (Thailand) Boonsak Ponsana (first round)

=== Top half ===
First Round
1 | (Malaysia) Lee C W | 21 | 21
(Indonesia) S D Kuncoro | 7 | 11
(Chinese Taipei) Chou T-c | 21 | 17 | 18
(France) B Leverdez | 18 | 21 | 21
8 | (Thailand) B Ponsana | 18 | 21 | 17
(Denmark) H-K Vittinghus | 21 | 14 | 21
Q3 | (Indonesia) W Y Prasetyo | 17 | 21 | 21
(England) R Ouseph | 21 | 18 | 15
4 | (Japan) K Tago | 19 | 21 | 24
(India) P Kashyap | 21 | 8 | 22
(China) Tian HW | 21 | 15 | 8
(Malaysia) Chong W F | 11 | 21 | 21
PFQ | (Indonesia) S Santoso | 21 | 13 | 22
(Germany) M Zwiebler | 12 | 21 | 20
(Vietnam) Nguyễn T M | 19 | 21 | 10
(Hong Kong) Hu Y | 21 | 17 | 21

Second Round
1 | (Malaysia) Lee C W | 21 | 21
(France) B Leverdez | 4 | 16
(Denmark) H-K Vittinghus | 21 | 21
Q3 | (Indonesia) W Y Prasetyo | 16 | 11
4 | (Japan) K Tago | 21 | 21
(Malaysia) Chong W F | 18 | 15
PFQ | (Indonesia) S Santoso | 18 | 21 | 20
(Hong Kong) Hu Y | 21 | 13 | 22

Quarterfinals
1 | (Malaysia) Lee C W | 21 | 21
(Denmark) H-K Vittinghus | 18 | 11
4 | (Japan) K Tago | 21 | 21
(Hong Kong) Hu Y | 18 | 11

Semifinals
1 | (Malaysia) Lee C W | 16 | 21 | 16
4 | (Japan) K Tago | 21 | 15 | 21

=== Bottom half ===
First Round
Q1 | (Indonesia) A Yunus | 16 | 18
(Japan) S Sasaki | 21 | 21
(China) Wang ZM | 25 | 13 | 17
7 | (South Korea) Son W-h | 23 | 21 | 21
(Japan) K Momota | 19 | 13
Q4 | (Malaysia) M A Abdul Latif | 21 | 21
(Japan) T Ueda | 18 | 14
3 | (Denmark) J Ø Jørgensen | 21 | 21
(India) S Kidambi | 12 | 21 | 16
Q2 | (China) Chen YK | 21 | 17 | 21
(Denmark) V Axelsen | 21 | 13 | 21
5 | (Indonesia) T Sugiarto | 18 | 21 | 12
PFQ | (South Korea) Lee D-k | 16 | 13
(Thailand) T Saensomboonsuk | 21 | 21
(Indonesia) D H Rumbaka | 17 | 11
2 | (China) Chen L | 21 | 21

Second Round
(Japan) S Sasaki | 6 | 9
7 | (South Korea) Son W-h | 21 | 21
Q4 | (Malaysia) M A Abdul Latif | 18 | 11
3 | (Denmark) J Ø Jørgensen | 21 | 21
Q2 | (China) Chen YK | 21 | 11 | 21
(Denmark) V Axelsen | 17 | 21 | 18
(Thailand) T Saensomboonsuk | 25 | 16 | 20
2 | (China) Chen L | 23 | 21 | 22

Quarterfinals
7 | (South Korea) Son W-h | 17 | 14
3 | (Denmark) J Ø Jørgensen | 21 | 21
Q2 | (China) Chen YK | 18 | 16
2 | (China) Chen L | 21 | 21

Semifinals
3 | (Denmark) J Ø Jørgensen | 21 | 21
2 | (China) Chen L | 19 | 18

=== Finals ===
Semifinals
1 | (Malaysia) Lee Chong Wei | 16 | 21 | 16
4 | (Japan) Kenichi Tago | 21 | 15 | 21
3 | (Denmark) Jan Ø. Jørgensen | 21 | 21
2 | (China) Chen Long | 19 | 18

Final
4 | (Japan) Kenichi Tago | 18 | 18
3 | (Denmark) Jan Ø. Jørgensen | 21 | 21

== Women's singles ==
=== Seeds ===
1. (China) Li Xuerui (champions)
2. (China) Wang Shixian (semifinals)
3. (China) Wang Yihan (second round)
4. (Thailand) Ratchanok Intanon (final)
5. (South Korea) Sung Ji-hyun (second round)
6. (South Korea) Bae Yeon-ju (quarterfinals)
7. (Chinese Taipei) Tai Tzu-ying (second round)
8. (India) Saina Nehwal (quarterfinals)

=== Top half ===
First Round
1 | (China) Li XR | 21 | 22
(Czech Republic) K Gavnholt | 12 | 20
(Canada) M Li | 18 | 14
Q1 | (Indonesia) A Firdasari | 21 | 21
8 | (India) S Nehwal | 21 | 21
(Thailand) P Buranaprasertsuk | 15 | 10
(Japan) S Takahashi | 19 | 21 | 20
(Scotland) K Gilmour | 21 | 19 | 22
3 | (China) Wang YH | 26 | 21
(India) P. V. Sindhu | 24 | 17
(Thailand) N Jindapol | 21 | 18 | 21
(Indonesia) L Fanetri | 16 | 21 | 12
6 | (South Korea) Bae Y-j | 21 | 21
(Japan) E Hirose | 8 | 19
(United States) J Subandhi | 17 | 17
Q2 | (Malaysia) Yang L L | 21 | 21

Second Round
1 | (China) Li XR | 21 | 21
Q1 | (Indonesia) A Firdasari | 12 | 19
8 | (India) S Nehwal | 21 | 21
(Scotland) K Gilmour | 17 | 9
3 | (China) Wang YH | 18 | 21 | 13
(Thailand) N Jindapol | 21 | 18 | 21
6 | (South Korea) Bae Y-j | 21 | 17 | 21
Q2 | (Malaysia) Yang L L | 11 | 21 | 8

Quarterfinals
1 | (China) Li XR | 22 | 21
8 | (India) S Nehwal | 20 | 15
(Thailand) N Jindapol | 17 | 21 | 22
6 | (South Korea) Bae Y-j | 21 | 14 | 20

Semifinals
1 | (China) Li XR | 21 | 21
(Thailand) N Jindapol | 19 | 10

=== Bottom half ===
First Round
(China) Sun Y | 21 | 21
(Indonesia) A Yuswandari | 12 | 18
(China) Han L | 19 | 16
5 | (South Korea) Sung J-h | 21 | 21
PFQ | (Malaysia) Tee J Y | 21 | 30
(Indonesia) H Desi | 19 | 28
Q4 | (Japan) A Yamaguchi | 18 | 21 | 18
4 | (Thailand) R Intanon | 21 | 19 | 21
(Indonesia) B Manuputty | 21 | 14 | 9
(Thailand) B Ongbamrungphan | 15 | 21 | 21
Q3 | (Indonesia) R A Riodingin | 13 | 18
7 | (Chinese Taipei) Tai T-y | 21 | 21
(Indonesia) M F Kusumastuti | 11 | 18
(Spain) C Marín | 21 | 21
(France) S Vignes Waran | 17 | 9
2 | (China) Wang SX | 21 | 21

Second Round
(China) Sun Y | 21 | 6 | 21
5 | (South Korea) Sung J-h | 13 | 21 | 10
PFQ | (Malaysia) Tee J Y | 10 | 24
4 | (Thailand) R Intanon | 21 | 26
(Thailand) B Ongbamrungphan | 21 | 17 | 21
7 | (Chinese Taipei) Tai T-y | 16 | 21 | 19
(Spain) C Marín | 17 | 13
2 | (China) Wang SX | 21 | 21

Quarterfinals
(China) Sun Y | 11 | 10
4 | (Thailand) R Intanon | 21 | 21
(Thailand) B Ongbamrungphan | 19 | 19
2 | (China) Wang SX | 21 | 21

Semifinals
4 | (Thailand) R Intanon | 19 | 21 | 21
2 | (China) Wang SX | 21 | 16 | 13

=== Finals ===
Semifinals
1 | (China) Li Xuerui | 21 | 21
(Thailand) Nitchaon Jindapol | 19 | 10
4 | (Thailand) Ratchanok Intanon | 19 | 21 | 21
2 | (China) Wang Shixian | 21 | 16 | 13

Final
1 | (China) Li Xuerui | 21 | 21
4 | (Thailand) Ratchanok Intanon | 13 | 13

== Men's doubles ==
=== Seeds ===
1. (Indonesia) Mohammad Ahsan / Hendra Setiawan (final)
2. (Denmark) Mathias Boe / Carsten Mogensen (second round)
3. (Japan) Hiroyuki Endo / Kenichi Hayakawa (first round)
4. (South Korea) Kim Gi-jung / Kim Sa-rang (semifinals)
5. (Chinese Taipei) Lee Sheng-mu / Tsai Chia-hsin (quarterfinals)
6. (South Korea) Lee Yong-dae / Yoo Yeon-seong (champions)
7. (China) Liu Xiaolong / Qiu Zihan (quarterfinals)
8. (Indonesia) Marcus Fernaldi Gideon / Markis Kido (quarterfinals)

=== Top half ===
First Round
1 | (Indonesia) M Ahsan (Indonesia) H Setiawan | 23 | 21
(Denmark) M Conrad-Petersen (Denmark) M Pieler Kolding | 21 | 11
(Denmark) K Astrup (Denmark) A Skaarup Rasmussen | 21 | 12 | 21
(China) Cai Y (China) Lu K | 19 | 21 | 15
8 | (Indonesia) M F Gideon (Indonesia) M Kido | 20 | 21 | 21
(South Korea) Ko S-h (South Korea) Shin B-c | 22 | 17 | 16
Q1 | (Indonesia) R Wijaya (Indonesia) R Sukmawan | 21 | 21
(Malaysia) Hoon T H (Malaysia) Ow Y H | 17 | 12
4 | (South Korea) Kim G-j (South Korea) Kim S-r | 21 | 21
Q4 | (Indonesia) A Y Chandra (Japan) S Ikeda | 19 | 5
(Indonesia) A Pratama (Indonesia) R A Saputro | 21 | 21
(Poland) A Cwałina (Poland) P Wacha | 15 | 16
5 | (Chinese Taipei) Lee S-m (Chinese Taipei) Tsai C-h | 21 | 17 | 21
(Russia) V Ivanov (Russia) I Sozonov | 14 | 21 | 13
Q2 | (Indonesia) S Geh (Indonesia) K S Sukamuljo | 21 | 21
(China) Kang J (China) Liu C | 18 | 19

Second Round
1 | (Indonesia) M Ahsan (Indonesia) H Setiawan | 21 | 21
(Denmark) K Astrp (Denmark) A Skaarup Rasmussen | 14 | 11
8 | (Indonesia) M F Gideon (Indonesia) M Kido | 11 | 21 | 21
Q1 | (Indonesia) R Wijaya (Indonesia) R Sukmawan | 21 | 18 | 14
4 | (South Korea) Kim G-j (South Korea) Kim S-r | 21 | 13 | 21
(Indonesia) A Pratama (Indonesia) R A Saputro | 16 | 21 | 16
5 | (Chinese Taipei) Lee S-m (Chinese Taipei) Tsai C-h | 23 | 21
Q2 | (Indonesia) S Geh (Indonesia) K S Sukamuljo | 21 | 19

Quarterfinals
1 | (Indonesia) M Ahsan (Indonesia) H Setiawan | 21 | 21 | 21
8 | (Indonesia) M F Gideon (Indonesia) M Kido | 13 | 23 | 13
4 | (South Korea) Kim G-j (South Korea) Kim S-r | 21 | 21
5 | (Chinese Taipei) Lee S-m (Chinese Taipei) Tsai C-h | 14 | 17

Semifinals
1 | (Indonesia) M Ahsan (Indonesia) H Setiawan | 17 | 21 | 21
4 | (South Korea) Kim G-j (South Korea) Kim S-r | 21 | 13 | 10

=== Bottom half ===
First Round
Q3 | (Indonesia) A Adistia (Indonesia) H A Gunawan | 21 | 21 | 13
(China) Chai B (China) Hong W | 17 | 23 | 21
(Japan) T Kamura (Japan) K Sonoda | 20 | 15
6 | (South Korea) Lee Y-d (South Korea) Yoo Y-s | 22 | 21
(Thailand) M Jongjit (Thailand) N Phuangphuapet | 21 | 18 | 19
(Malaysia) Tan B H (Malaysia) Tan W K | 12 | 21 | 21
(Indonesia) B Angriawan (Indonesia) R K Suwardi | 24 | 21
3 | (Japan) H Endo (Japan) K Hayakawa | 22 | 19
(Germany) M Fuchs (Germany) J Schöttler | 19 | 20
(England) C Adcock (England) A Ellis | 21 | 22
(Malaysia) Goh V S (Malaysia) Lim K W | 20 | 15
7 | (China) Liu XL (China) Qiu ZH | 22 | 21
(China) Fu HF (China) Zhang N | 21 | 21
PFQ | (Indonesia) F Kurniawan (Indonesia) B Septano | 13 | 14
(Indonesia) W Nayaka (Indonesia) A Yusuf | 17 | 20
2 | (Denmark) M Boe (Denmark) C Mogensen | 21 | 22

Second Round
(China) Chai B (China) Hong W | 17 | 14
6 | (South Korea) Lee Y-d (South Korea) Yoo Y-s | 21 | 21
(Malaysia) Tan B H (Malaysia) Tan W K | 18 | 21 | 21
(Indonesia) B Angriawan (Indonesia) R K Suwardi | 21 | 18 | 17
(England) C Adcock (England) A Ellis | 12 | 13^{r}
7 | (China) Liu XL (China) Qiu ZH | 21 | 18
(China) Fu HF (China) Zhang N | 21 | 21
2 | (Denmark) M Boe (Denmark) C Mogensen | 18 | 19

Quarterfinals
6 | (South Korea) Lee Y-d (South Korea) Yoo Y-s | 15 | 21 | 21
(Malaysia) Tan B H (Malaysia) Tan W K | 21 | 6 | 19
7 | (China) Liu XL (China) Qiu ZH | 11 | 14
(China) Fu HF (China) Zhang N | 21 | 21

Semifinals
6 | (South Korea) Lee Y-d (South Korea) Yoo Y-s | 21 | 23
(China) Fu HF (China) Zhang N | 16 | 21

=== Finals ===
Semifinals
1 | (Indonesia) Mohammad Ahsan (Indonesia) Hendra Setiawan | 17 | 21 | 21
4 | (South Korea) Kim Gi-jung (South Korea) Kim Sa-rang | 21 | 13 | 10
6 | (South Korea) Lee Yong-dae (South Korea) Yoo Yeon-seong | 21 | 23
(China) Fu Haifeng (China) Zhang Nan | 16 | 21

Final
1 | (Indonesia) Mohammad Ahsan (Indonesia) Hendra Setiawan | 15 | 17
6 | (South Korea) Lee Yong-dae (South Korea) Yoo Yeon-seong | 21 | 21

== Women's doubles ==
=== Seeds ===
1. (China) Bao Yixin / Tang Jinhua (withdrew)
2. (Denmark) Christinna Pedersen / Kamilla Rytter Juhl (quarterfinals)
3. (China) Wang Xiaoli / Yu Yang (withdrew)
4. (Japan) Misaki Matsutomo / Ayaka Takahashi (second round)
5. (South Korea) Chang Ye-na / Kim So-young (semifinals)
6. (Japan) Reika Kakiiwa / Miyuki Maeda (second round)
7. (Indonesia) Nitya Krishinda Maheswari / Greysia Polii (second round)
8. (China) Tian Qing / Zhao Yunlei (champions)

=== Top half ===
First Round
PFQ | (Indonesia) K N Hanadia (Indonesia) D T Permatasari | 22 | 21
(Malaysia) A A Anscelly (Malaysia) Soong F C | 20 | 18
(China) Luo Y (China) Luo Y | 21 | 11 | 21
(Denmark) L Damkjær Kruse (Denmark) M Rœpke | 12 | 21 | 12
8 | (China) Tian Q (China) Zhao YL | 21 | 21
(Indonesia) S R Andini (Indonesia) T R Nuraidah | 17 | 6
(Japan) S Matsuo (Japan) M Naito | 21 | 21
(England) G Adcock (England) L Smith | 13 | 18
4 | (Japan) M Matsutomo (Japan) A Takahashi | 21 | 21
(United States) E Lee (United States) P L Obañana | 12 | 10
(South Korea) Jung K-e (South Korea) Kim H-n | 21 | 21
Q4 | (Indonesia) M D Giovani (Indonesia) M D Oktavianti | 9 | 14
6 | (Japan) R Kakiiwa (Japan) M Maeda | 19 | 21 | 21
(Thailand) D Aroonkesorn (Thailand) K Voravichitchaikul | 21 | 16 | 14
(South Korea) Lee S-h (South Korea) Shin S-c | 21 | 21
Q2 | (Scotland) I Bankier (Scotland) K Gilmour | 15 | 15

Second Round
PFQ | (Indonesia) K N Hanadia (Indonesia) D T Permatasari | 8 | 11
(China) Luo Y (China) Luo Y | 21 | 21
8 | (China) Tian Q (China) Zhao YL | 21 | 21
(Japan) S Matsuo (Japan) M Naito | 19 | 13
4 | (Japan) M Matsutomo (Japan) A Takahashi | 21 | 19 | 11
(South Korea) Jung K-e (South Korea) Kim H-n | 17 | 21 | 21
6 | (Japan) R Kakiiwa (Japan) M Maeda | 13 | 17
(South Korea) Lee S-h (South Korea) Shin S-c | 21 | 21

Quarterfinals
(China) Luo Y (China) Luo Y | 11 | 15
8 | (China) Tian Q (China) Zhao YL | 21 | 21
(South Korea) Jung K-e (South Korea) Kim H-n | 22 | 21
(South Korea) Lee S-h (South Korea) Shin S-c | 20 | 10

Semifinals
8 | (China) Tian Q (China) Zhao YL | 21 | 21
(South Korea) Jung K-e (South Korea) Kim H-n | 15 | 9

=== Bottom half ===
First Round
(China) Ma J (China) Tang YT | 21 | 21
(Netherlands) E Muskens (Netherlands) S Piek | 14 | 14
(Singapore) Fu MT (Singapore) V Neo | 11 | 13
7 | (Indonesia) N K Maheswari (Indonesia) G Polii | 21 | 21
Q3 | (Indonesia) K Dewi (Indonesia) J Gozali | 18 | 22
(Singapore) S M Sari (Singapore) Yao L | 21 | 24
Q1 | (Indonesia) S P Irawati (Indonesia) V Marissa | 21 | 14 | 21
PFQ | (Malaysia) Lim Y L (Malaysia) Lee M Y | 16 | 21 | 15
(India) J Gutta (India) A Ponnappa | 13 | 22 | 21
(Indonesia) P Z Bernadet (Indonesia) R A Pradipta | 21 | 20 | 11
(Indonesia) A S Awanda (Indonesia) D D Haris | 10 | 21 | 16
5 | (South Korea) Chang Y-n (South Korea) Kim S-y | 21 | 14 | 21
(South Korea) Go A-r (South Korea) Yoo H-w | 21 | 21
(Thailand) P Supajirakul (Thailand) S Taerattanachai | 18 | 14
(England) H Olver (England) K Robertshaw | 8 | 21 | 16
2 | (Denmark) C Pedersen (Denmark) K Rytter Juhl | 21 | 19 | 21

Second Round
(China) Ma J (China) Tang YT | 21 | 15 | 21
7 | (Indonesia) N K Maheswari (Indonesia) G Polii | 17 | 21 | 15
(Singapore) S M Sari (Singapore) Yao L | 22 | 7 | 25
Q1 | (Indonesia) S P Irawati (Indonesia) V Marissa | 20 | 21 | 23
(India) J Gutta (India) A Ponnappa | 16 | 21 | 12
5 | (South Korea) Chang Y-n (South Korea) Kim S-y | 21 | 15 | 21
(South Korea) Go A-r (South Korea) Yoo H-w | 12 | 15
2 | (Denmark) C Pedersen (Denmark) K Rytter Juhl | 21 | 21

Quarterfinals
(China) Ma J (China) Tang YT | 21 | 17 | 22
(Singapore) S M Sari (Singapore) Yao L | 18 | 21 | 20
5 | (South Korea) Chang Y-n (South Korea) Kim S-y | 14 | 22 | 22
(Denmark) C Pedersen (Denmark) K Rytter Juhl | 21 | 20 | 20

Semifinals
(China) Ma J (China) Tang YT | 22 | 22
5 | (South Korea) Chang Y-n (South Korea) Kim S-y | 20 | 20

=== Finals ===
Semifinals
8 | (China) Tian Qing (China) Zhao Yunlei | 21 | 21
(South Korea) Jung Kyung-eun (South Korea) Kim Ha-na | 15 | 9
(China) Ma Jin (China) Tang Yuanting | 22 | 22
5 | (South Korea) Chang Ye-na (South Korea) Kim So-young | 20 | 20

Final
8 | (China) Tian Qing (China) Zhao Yunlei | w | / | o
(China) Ma Jin (China) Tang Yuanting

== Mixed doubles ==
=== Seeds ===
1. (China) Zhang Nan / Zhao Yunlei (first round)
2. (Indonesia) Tontowi Ahmad / Liliyana Natsir (semifinals)
3. (China) Xu Chen / Ma Jin (final)
4. (Denmark) Joachim Fischer Nielsen / Christinna Pedersen (champions)
5. (England) Chris Adcock / Gabby Adcock (quarterfinals)
6. (Indonesia) Markis Kido / Pia Zebadiah Bernadet (first round)
7. (Thailand) Sudket Prapakamol / Saralee Thungthongkam (first round)
8. (South Korea) Ko Sung-hyun / Kim Ha-na (quarterfinals)

=== Top half ===
First Round
1 | (China) Zhang N (China) Zhao YL | 21 | 18 | 21
Q1 | (Indonesia) K S Sukamuljo (Indonesia) G Polii | 15 | 21 | 23
(Indonesia) R Widianto (Indonesia) R P Dili | 16 | 14
(South Korea) Lee Y-d (South Korea) Shin S-c | 21 | 21
7 | (Thailand) S Prapakamol (Thailand) S Thungthongkam | 19 | 20
(Netherlands) J Arends (Netherlands) S Piek | 21 | 22
(Indonesia) M Rijal (Indonesia) V Marissa | 17 | 18
(England) C Langridge (England) H Olver | 21 | 21
4 | (Denmark) J Fischer Nielsen (Denmark) C Pedersen | 21 | 15 | 21
Q4 | (Thailand) N Phuangphuapet (Thailand) P Supajirakul | 8 | 21 | 17
(Indonesia) P Jordan (Indonesia) D Susanto | 21 | 19 | 23
(Scotland) R Blair (Scotland) I Bankier | 17 | 21 | 21
8 | (South Korea) Ko S-h (South Korea) Kim H-n | 21 | 21
Q3 | (Japan) T Kamura (Japan) S Matuso | 16 | 8
PFQ | (India) T Kona (India) A Ponnappa | 21 | 14 | 19
(Germany) P Käsbauer (Germany) I Herttrich | 19 | 21 | 21

Second Round
Q1 | (Indonesia) K S Sukamuljo (Indonesia) G Polii | 18 | 17
(South Korea) Lee Y-d (South Korea) Shin S-c | 21 | 21
(Netherlands) J Arends (Netherlands) S Piek | 21 | 17 | 21
(England) C Langridge (England) H Olver | 9 | 21 | 16
4 | (Denmark) J Fischer Nielsen (Denmark) C Pedersen | 16 | 21 | 21
(Indonesia) P Jordan (Indonesia) D Susanto | 21 | 16 | 11
8 | (South Korea) Ko S-h (South Korea) Kim H-n | 21 | 21
(Germany) P Käsbauer (Germany) I Herttrich | 12 | 13

Quarterfinals
(South Korea) Lee Y-d (South Korea) Shin S-c | 21 | 10
(Netherlands) J Arends (Netherlands) S Piek | 17 | 8^{r}
4 | (Denmark) J Fischer Nielsen (Denmark) C Pedersen | 11 | 21 | 21
8 | (South Korea) Ko S-h (South Korea) Kim H-n | 21 | 16 | 9

Semifinals
(South Korea) Lee Y-d (South Korea) Shin S-c | 18 | 15
4 | (Denmark) J Fischer Nielsen (Denmark) C Pedersen | 21 | 21

=== Bottom half ===
First Round
(Denmark) M Pieler Kolding (Denmark) K Rytter Juhl | 21 | 21
(United States) P Chew (United States) J Subandhi | 9 | 11
(China) Lu K (China) Huang YQ | 21 | 17 | 21
6 | (Indonesia) M Kido (Indonesia) P Z Bernadet | 18 | 21 | 14
PFQ | (Indonesia) M F Gideon (Indonesia) R A Pradipta | 21 | 17 | 10
(Singapore) D B Chrisnanta (Singapore) V Neo | 16 | 21 | 21
(South Korea) Kim G-j (South Korea) Kim S-y | 19 | 6
3 | (China) Xu C (China) Ma J | 21 | 21
(Indonesia) I Fadhilah (Indonesia) W Anggraini | 18 | 21 | 13
(Thailand) M Jongjit (Thailand) S Taerattanachai | 21 | 16 | 21
(Japan) K Hayakawa (Japan) M Matsutomo | 17 | 21 | 18
5 | (England) C Adcock (England) G Adcock | 21 | 18 | 21
Q2 | (Indonesia) A E Prasetya (Indonesia) A Saufika | 18 | 17
(South Korea) Shin B-c (South Korea) Chang Y-n | 21 | 21
(Germany) M Fuchs (Germany) B Michels | 16 | 21 | 19
2 | (Indonesia) T Ahmad (Indonesia) L Natsir | 21 | 18 | 21

Second Round
(Denmark) M Pieler Kolding (Denmark) K Rytter Juhl | 18 | 21 | 18
(China) Lu K (China) Huang YQ | 21 | 17 | 21
(Singapore) D B Chrisnanta (Singapore) V Neo | 12 | 13
3 | (China) Xu C (China) Ma J | 21 | 21
(Thailand) M Jongjit (Thailand) S Taerattanachai | 26 | 13 | 18
5 | (England) C Adcock (England) G Adcock | 24 | 21 | 21
(South Korea) Shin B-c (South Korea) Chang Y-n | 11 | 24 | 13
(Indonesia) T Ahmad (Indonesia) L Natsir | 21 | 22 | 21

Quarterfinals
(China) Lu K (China) Huang YQ | 13 | 17
3 | (China) Xu C (China) Ma J | 21 | 21
5 | (England) C Adcock (England) G Adcock | 12 | 8
2 | (Indonesia) T Ahmad (Indonesia) L Natsir | 21 | 21

Semifinals
3 | (China) Xu C (China) Ma J | 18 | 21 | 21
2 | (Indonesia) T Ahmad (Indonesia) L Natsir | 21 | 12 | 15

=== Finals ===
Semifinals
(South Korea) Lee Yong-dae (South Korea) Shin Seung-chan | 18 | 15
4 | (Denmark) Joachim Fischer Nielsen (Denmark) Christinna Pedersen | 21 | 21
3 | (China) Xu Chen (China) Ma Jin | 18 | 21 | 21
2 | (Indonesia) Tontowi Ahmad (Indonesia) Liliyana Natsir | 21 | 12 | 15

Final
4 | (Denmark) Joachim Fischer Nielsen (Denmark) Christinna Pedersen | 18 | 21 | 21
3 | (China) Xu Chen (China) Ma Jin | 21 | 16 | 14

| Preceded by 2013 Indonesia Super Series | Indonesia Super Series | Succeeded by 2015 Indonesia Super Series |
| Preceded by 2014 Japan Super Series | BWF Super Series; 2014 Season | Succeeded by 2014 Australian Super Series |
