= 2015 Indonesia Super Series Premier =

Tournament details
- Dates: 2–7 June
- Edition: 34th
- Level: Super Series Premier
- Total prize money: US$800,000
- Venue: Istora Gelora Bung Karno
- Location: Jakarta, Indonesia

Champions
- Men's singles: (Japan) Kento Momota
- Women's singles: (Thailand) Ratchanok Intanon
- Men's doubles: (South Korea) Ko Sung-hyun (South Korea) Shin Baek-cheol
- Women's doubles: (China) Tang Jinhua (China) Tian Qing
- Mixed doubles: (China) Xu Chen (China) Ma Jin

The 2015 Indonesia Super Series Premier was the sixth Super Series tournament of the 2015 BWF Super Series. The tournament took place in Jakarta, Indonesia from 2–7 June 2015 with a total purse of $800,000.

== Men's singles ==
=== Seeds ===
1. (China) Chen Long (Quarterfinals)
2. (China) Lin Dan (1st round)
3. (Denmark) Jan Ø. Jørgensen (Final)
4. (India) Srikanth Kidambi (2nd round)
5. (South Korea) Son Wan-ho (2nd round)
6. (China) Wang Zhengming (2nd round)
7. (Chinese Taipei) Chou Tien-chen (1st round)
8. (Japan) Kento Momota (Champion)
Qualification

=== Qualifying draw ===
==== Qualifier 1 ====
First Round
1 | (Thailand) Boonsak Ponsana | 21 | 21
(Indonesia) Andre Marteen | 5 | 11
(Indonesia) Jonatan Christie | 21 | 19 | 24
(Indonesia) Firman Abdul Kholik | 16 | 21 | 22

Second Round
1 | (Thailand) Boonsak Ponsana | 20 | 17
(Indonesia) Jonatan Christie | 22 | 21

==== Qualifier 2 ====
First Round
3 | (Hong Kong) Angus Ng Ka Long | 21 | 21
(Indonesia) Riyanto Subagja | 13 | 14
(Indonesia) Wisnu Yuli Prasetyo | 17 | 14
(Malaysia) Zulfadli Zulkiffli | 21 | 21

Second Round
3 | (Hong Kong) Angus Ng Ka Long | 23 | 11 | 20
(Malaysia) Zulfadli Zulkiffli | 21 | 21 | 22

==== Qualifier 3 ====
First Round
(Indonesia) Sony Dwi Kuncoro | 17 | 21 | 21
(United States) Sattawat Pongnairat | 21 | 13 | 2
(Indonesia) Andre Kurniawan Tedjono | 15 | 16
PFR | (Indonesia) Anthony Sinisuka Ginting | 21 | 21

Second Round
(Indonesia) Sony Dwi Kuncoro | 9 | 16
PFR | (Indonesia) Anthony Sinisuka Ginting | 21 | 21

==== Qualifier 4 ====
First Round
(Malaysia) Mohamad Arif Abdul Latif | 17 | 11
(Indonesia) Ihsan Maulana Mustofa | 21 | 21
(Indonesia) Thomi Azizan Mahbub | 21 | 13
2 | (South Korea) Lee Dong-keun | 23 | 21

Second Round
(Indonesia) Ihsan Maulana Mustofa | 19 | 19
2 | (South Korea) Lee Dong-keun | 21 | 21

=== Top half ===
First Round
1 | (China) Chen L | 21 | 21
(Hong Kong) Wei N | 19 | 12
(Japan) T Ueda | 18 | 15
(England) R Ouseph | 21 | 21
5 | (South Korea) Son W-h | 21 | 21
(China) Tian HW | 15 | 16
(Thailand) T Saensomboonsuk | 17 | 7
(India) K Parupalli | 21 | 21
4 | (India) Srikanth K. | 11 | 21 | 24
(Denmark) H-K Vittinghus | 21 | 14 | 22
(France) B Leverdez | 14 | 21
Q3 | (Indonesia) A S Ginting | 21 | 23
8 | (Japan) K Momota | 20 | 21 | 21
(Hong Kong) Wong W K | 22 | 18 | 18
(Denmark) V Axelsen | 13 | 16
(Hong Kong) Hu Y | 21 | 21

Second Round
1 | (China) Chen L | 21 | 21
(England) R Ouseph | 16 | 10
5 | (South Korea) Son W-h | 11 | 14
(India) K Parupalli | 21 | 21
4 | (India) Srikanth K. | 21 | 20 | 13
Q3 | (Indonesia) A S Ginting | 14 | 22 | 21
8 | (Japan) K Momota | 21 | 21
(Hong Kong) Hu Y | 15 | 17

Quarterfinals
1 | (China) Chen L | 21 | 17 | 14
(India) K Parupalli | 14 | 21 | 21
Q3 | (Indonesia) A S Ginting | 21 | 16 | 15
8 | (Japan) K Momota | 13 | 21 | 21

Semifinals
(India) K Parupalli | 21 | 17 | 19
8 | (Japan) K Momota | 12 | 21 | 21

=== Bottom half ===
First Round
(South Korea) Lee H-i | 21 | 21
(Japan) S Sasaki | 13 | 17
Q1 | (Indonesia) J Christie | 21 | 21
7 | (Chinese Taipei) Chou T-c | 18 | 19
(China) Xue S | 14 | 14
(Indonesia) D H Rumbaka | 21 | 21
Q4 | (South Korea) Lee D-k | 23 | 7
3 | (Denmark) J Ø Jørgensen | 25 | 21
(Japan) K Tago | 21 | 21
(Chinese Taipei) Hsu J-h | 19 | 9
Q2 | (Malaysia) Z Zulkiffli | 11 | 15
6 | (China) Wang ZM | 21 | 21
(Germany) M Zwiebler | 21 | 21
(Republic of Ireland) S Evans | 15 | 17
(Indonesia) T Sugiarto | 19 | 21 | 21
2 | (China) Lin D | 21 | 8 | 16

Second Round
(South Korea) Lee H-i | 17 | 19
Q1 | (Indonesia) J Christie | 21 | 21
(Indonesia) D H Rumbaka | 12 | 21 | 14
3 | (Denmark) J Ø Jørgensen | 21 | 14 | 21
(Japan) K Tago | 21 | 21
6 | (China) Wang ZM | 13 | 15
(Germany) M Zwiebler | 16 | 22 | 21
(Indonesia) T Sugiarto | 21 | 20 | 19

Quarterfinals
Q1 | (Indonesia) J Christie | 13 | 15
3 | (Denmark) J Ø Jørgensen | 21 | 21
(Japan) K Tago | 15 | 21 | 17
(Germany) M Zwiebler | 21 | 19 | 21

Semifinals
3 | (Denmark) J Ø Jørgensen | 21 | 11
(Germany) M Zwiebler | 17 | 5^{r}

=== Finals ===
Semifinals
(India) Kashyap Parupalli | 21 | 17 | 19
8 | (Japan) Kento Momota | 12 | 21 | 21
3 | (Denmark) Jan Ø. Jørgensen | 21 | 11
(Germany) Marc Zwiebler | 17 | 5^{r}

Final
8 | (Japan) Kento Momota | 16 | 21 | 21
3 | (Denmark) Jan Ø. Jørgensen | 21 | 19 | 7

== Women's singles ==
=== Seeds ===
1. (China) Li Xuerui (2nd round)
2. (India) Saina Nehwal (Quarterfinals)
3. (Spain) Carolina Marín (1st round)
4. (Chinese Taipei) Tai Tzu-ying (2nd round)
5. (China) Wang Shixian (Semifinals)
6. (Thailand) Ratchanok Intanon (Champion)
7. (South Korea) Sung Ji-hyun (1st round)
8. (China) Wang Yihan (Semifinals)

=== Top half ===
First Round
1 | (China) Li XR | 10 | 21 | 21
(Scotland) K Gilmour | 21 | 15 | 15
(South Korea) Kim H-m | 8 | 21 | 14
(Japan) A Yamaguchi | 21 | 16 | 21
8 | (China) Wang YH | 16 | 21 | 21
(Bulgaria) L Zetchiri | 21 | 12 | 9
(Germany) K Schnaase | 21 | 21
Q3 | (China) Yao X | 14 | 14
3 | (Spain) C Marín | 21 | 15 | 17
(Japan) Y Hashimoto | 10 | 21 | 21
(Japan) M Mitani | 21 | 21
(Indonesia) A Firdasari | 18 | 15
7 | (South Korea) Sung J-h | 21 | 23 | 13
(Hong Kong) Yip P Y | 23 | 21 | 21
Q2 | (Indonesia) R Hartawan | 19 | 14
Q1 | (Indonesia) M F Kusumastuti | 21 | 21

Second Round
1 | (China) Li XR | 21 | 18 | 13
(Japan) A Yamaguchi | 12 | 21 | 21
8 | (China) Wang YH | 21 | 21
(Germany) K Schnaase | 8 | 15
(Japan) Y Hashimoto | 11 | 21 | 21
(Japan) M Mitani | 21 | 19 | 8
(Hong Kong) Yip P Y | 17 | 4
Q1 | (Indonesia) M F Kusumastuti | 21 | 21

Quarterfinals
(Japan) A Yamaguchi | 21 | 8 | 9
8 | (China) Wang YH | 14 | 21 | 21
(Japan) Y Hashimoto | 16 | 21 | 22
Q1 | (Indonesia) M F Kusumastuti | 21 | 16 | 20

Semifinals
8 | (China) Wang YH | 17 | 21 | 17
(Japan) Y Hashimoto | 21 | 9 | 21

=== Bottom half ===
First Round
(China) Sun Y | 16 | 13
(Thailand) B Ongbumrungpan | 21 | 21
(Chinese Taipei) Pai Y-p | 11 | 12
6 | (Thailand) R Intanon | 21 | 21
Q4 | (Indonesia) L Fanetri | 21 | 21
(Canada) M Li | 17 | 11
(Thailand) P Buranaprasertsuk | 15 | 21 | 12
4 | (Chinese Taipei) Tai T-y | 21 | 19 | 21
(Japan) N Okuhara | 19 | 7
(South Korea) Bae Y-j | 21 | 21
(Spain) B Corrales | 13 | 11
5 | (China) Wang SX | 21 | 21
(Chinese Taipei) Hsu Y-c | 16 | 21 | 21
(India) P.V. Sindhu | 21 | 15 | 14
(Thailand) N Jindapon | 16 | 18
2 | (India) S Nehwal | 21 | 21

Second Round
(Thailand) B Ongbumrungpan | 16 | 19
6 | (Thailand) R Intanon | 21 | 21
Q4 | (Indonesia) L Fanetri | 21 | 22
4 | (Chinese Taipei) Tai T-y | 18 | 20
(South Korea) Bae Y-j | 15 | 13
5 | (China) Wang SX | 21 | 21
(Chinese Taipei) Hsu Y-c | 13 | 15
2 | (India) S Nehwal | 21 | 21

Quarterfinals
6 | (Thailand) R Intanon | 21 | 21
Q4 | (Indonesia) L Fanetri | 7 | 6
5 | (China) Wang SX | 16 | 21 | 21
2 | (India) S Nehwal | 21 | 12 | 18

Semifinals
6 | (Thailand) R Intanon | 21 | 21
5 | (China) Wang SX | 19 | 13

=== Finals ===
Semifinals
8 | (China) Wang Yihan | 17 | 21 | 17
(Japan) Yui Hashimoto | 21 | 9 | 21
6 | (Thailand) Ratchanok Intanon | 21 | 21
5 | (China) Wang Shixian | 19 | 13

Final
(Japan) Yui Hashimoto | 11 | 10
6 | (Thailand) Ratchanok Intanon | 21 | 21

== Men's doubles ==
=== Seeds ===
1. (South Korea) Lee Yong-dae / Yoo Yeon-seong (Semifinals)
2. (Denmark) Mathias Boe / Carsten Mogensen (Quarterfinals)
3. (Indonesia) Mohammad Ahsan / Hendra Setiawan (Semifinals)
4. (Chinese Taipei) Lee Sheng-mu / Tsai Chia-hsin (2nd round)
5. (China) Chai Biao / Hong Wei (Quarterfinals)
6. (Japan) Hiroyuki Endo / Kenichi Hayakawa (Quarterfinals)
7. (China) Liu Xiaolong / Qiu Zihan (1st round)
8. (China) Fu Haifeng / Zhang Nan (Final)

=== Top half ===
First Round
1 | (South Korea) Lee Y-d (South Korea) Yoo Y-s | 14 | 21 | 21
(Indonesia) M Kido (Indonesia) A P R Putra | 21 | 13 | 14
(South Korea) Kim K-j (South Korea) Kim S-r | 20 | 21 | 19
(England) M Ellis (England) C Langridge | 22 | 16 | 21
5 | (China) Chai B (China) Hong W | 21 | 21
(Denmark) K Astrup (Denmark) A S Rasmussen | 16 | 13
(India) P J Chopra (India) A Dewalker | 21 | 22
(Canada) A Liu (Canada) D Ng | 17 | 20
4 | (Chinese Taipei) Lee S-m (Chinese Taipei) Tsai C-h | 21 | 21
(India) M Attri (India) S Reddy B | 13 | 11
(South Korea) Ko S-h (South Korea) Shin B-c | 21 | 21
Q1 | (China) Cai Y (China) Kang J | 14 | 19
7 | (China) Liu XL (China) Qiu ZH | 12 | 15
(Denmark) M Conrad-Petersen (Denmark) M Pieler Kolding | 21 | 21
(Russia) V Ivanov (Russia) I Sozonov | 15 | 21 | 16
(Indonesia) W Nayaka (Indonesia) A Yusuf | 21 | 11 | 21

Second Round
1 | (South Korea) Lee Y-d (South Korea) Yoo Y-s | 16 | 21 | 21
(England) M Ellis (England) C Langridge | 21 | 11 | 16
5 | (China) Chai B (China) Hong W | 21 | 21
(India) P J Chopra (India) A Dewalker | 13 | 11
4 | (Chinese Taipei) Lee S-m (Chinese Taipei) Tsai C-h | 14 | 18
(South Korea) Ko S-h (South Korea) Shin B-c | 21 | 21
(Denmark) M Conrad-Petersen (Denmark) M Pieler Kolding | 21 | 14 | 12
(Indonesia) W Nayaka (Indonesia) A Yusuf | 14 | 21 | 21

Quarterfinals
1 | (South Korea) Lee Y-d (South Korea) Yoo Y-s | 21 | 19 | 21
5 | (China) Chai B (China) Hong W | 17 | 21 | 10
(South Korea) Ko S-h (South Korea) Shin B-c | 21 | 19 | 24
(Indonesia) W Nayaka (Indonesia) A Yusuf | 18 | 21 | 22

Semifinals
1 | (South Korea) Lee Y-d (South Korea) Yoo Y-s | 17 | 18
(South Korea) Ko S-h (South Korea) Shin B-c | 21 | 21

=== Bottom half ===
First Round
Q3 | (Indonesia) B Angriawan (Indonesia) R A Saputro | 21 | 21
(Japan) T Kamura (Japan) K Sonoda | 17 | 15
(Chinese Taipei) Chen H-l (Chinese Taipei) Wang C-l | 22 | 20 | 19
6 | (Japan) H Endo (Japan) K Hayakawa | 20 | 22 | 21
(Indonesia) M F Gideon (Indonesia) K S Sukamuljo | 21 | 21
Q2 | (Chinese Taipei) Lin C-y (Chinese Taipei) Wu H-l | 12 | 14
(England) A Ellis (England) P Mills | 13 | 13
3 | (Indonesia) M Ahsan (Indonesia) H Setiwan | 21 | 21
(Malaysia) Goh V S (Malaysia) Tan W K | 21 | 21
(Japan) H Hashimoto (Japan) N Hirata | 18 | 15
(Indonesia) A Pratama (Indonesia) R K Suwardi | 22 | 11
8 | (China) Fu HF (China) Zhang N | 24 | 21
(United States) P Chew (United States) S Pongnairat | 11 | 15
(Indonesia) A Adistia (Indonesia) H A Gunawan | 21 | 21
Q4 | (Thailand) B Issara (Thailand) N Puangpuapech | 14 | 19
2 | (Denmark) M Boe (Denmark) C Mogensen | 21 | 21

Second Round
Q3 | (Indonesia) B Angriawan (Indonesia) R A Saputro | 22 | 11 | 8
6 | (Japan) H Endo (Japan) K Hayakawa | 20 | 21 | 21
(Indonesia) M F Gideon (Indonesia) K S Sukamuljo | 17 | 15
3 | (Indonesia) M Ahsan (Indonesia) H Setiwan | 21 | 21
(Malaysia) Goh V S (Malaysia) Tan W K | 14 | 15
8 | (China) Fu HF (China) Zhang N | 21 | 21
(Indonesia) A Adistia (Indonesia) H A Gunawan | 18 | 14
2 | (Denmark) M Boe (Denmark) C Mogensen | 21 | 21

Quarterfinals
6 | (Japan) H Endo (Japan) K Hayakawa | 16 | 16
3 | (Indonesia) M Ahsan (Indonesia) H Setiwan | 21 | 21
8 | (China) Fu HF (China) Zhang N | W | / | O
2 | (Denmark) M Boe (Denmark) C Mogensen

Semifinals
3 | (Indonesia) M Ahsan (Indonesia) H Setiwan | 20 | 21 | 15
8 | (China) Fu HF (China) Zhang N | 22 | 18 | 21

=== Finals ===
Semifinals
1 | (South Korea) Lee Yong-dae (South Korea) Yoo Yeon-seong | 17 | 18
(South Korea) Ko Sung-hyun (South Korea) Shin Baek-cheol | 21 | 21
3 | (Indonesia) Mohammad Ahsan (Indonesia) Hendra Setiawan | 20 | 21 | 15
8 | (China) Fu Haifeng (China) Zhang Nan | 22 | 18 | 21

Final
(South Korea) Ko Sung-hyun (South Korea) Shin Baek-cheol | 21 | 16 | 21
8 | (China) Fu Haifeng (China) Zhang Nan | 16 | 21 | 19

== Women's doubles ==
=== Seeds ===
1. (Japan) Misaki Matsutomo / Ayaka Takahashi (2nd round)
2. (China) Luo Ying / Luo Yu (Quarterfinals)
3. (Denmark) Christinna Pedersen / Kamilla Rytter Juhl (Quarterfinals)
4. (Japan) Reika Kakiiwa / Miyuki Maeda (1st round)
5. (China) Ma Jin / Tang Yuanting (Semifinals)
6. (Indonesia) Nitya Krishinda Maheswari / Greysia Polii (Final)
7. (China) Yu Yang / Zhong Qianxin (Semifinals)
8. (China) Tang Jinhua / Tian Qing (Champion)

=== Top half ===
First Round
1 | (Japan) M Matsutomo (Japan) A Takahashi | 21 | 21
(Indonesia) P Z Bernadeth (Indonesia) R A Pradipta | 18 | 13
(South Korea) Lee S-h (South Korea) Shin S-c | 21 | 21
Q2 | (Chinese Taipei) Hsieh P-c (Chinese Taipei) Wu T-j | 16 | 16
5 | (China) Ma J (China) Tang YT | 21 | 21
(South Korea) Go A-r (South Korea) Yoo H-w | 12 | 7
Q1 | (South Korea) Chae Y-j (South Korea) Kim S-y | 21 | 21
Q3 | (Indonesia) N P Lestari (Indonesia) M C Sahputri | 8 | 14
4 | (Japan) R Kakiiwa (Japan) M Maeda | 18 | 21 | 20
(England) H Olver (England) L Smith | 21 | 15 | 22
(Netherlands) E Muskens (Netherlands) S Piek | 23 | 22
(Indonesia) A S Awanda (Indonesia) N K M Istirani | 21 | 18
8 | (China) Tang JH (China) Tian Q | 21 | 22
(Netherlands) S Barning (Netherlands) I Tabeling | 11 | 20
Q4 | (Indonesia) S R Andini (Indonesia) M D Giovani | 21 | 20 | 11
(Japan) N Fukuman (Japan) K Yonao | 17 | 22 | 21

Second Round
1 | (Japan) M Matsutomo (Japan) A Takahashi | 15 | 13
(South Korea) Lee S-h (South Korea) Shin S-c | 21 | 21
5 | (China) Ma J (China) Tang YT | 21 | 21
Q1 | (South Korea) Chae Y-j (South Korea) Kim S-y | 17 | 14
(England) H Olver (England) L Smith | 10 | 12
(Netherlands) E Muskens (Netherlands) S Piek | 21 | 21
8 | (China) Tang JH (China) Tian Q | 21 | 21
(Japan) N Fukuman (Japan) K Yonao | 12 | 17

Quarterfinals
(South Korea) Lee S-h (South Korea) Shin S-c | 11 | 21 | 12
5 | (China) Ma J (China) Tang YT | 21 | 17 | 21
(Netherlands) E Muskens (Netherlands) S Piek | 21 | 14 | 17
8 | (China) Tang JH (China) Tian Q | 16 | 21 | 21

Semifinals
5 | (China) Ma J (China) Tang YT | 10 | 14
8 | (China) Tang JH (China) Tian Q | 21 | 21

=== Bottom half ===
First Round
(India) J Gutta (India) A Ponnappa | 21 | 19 | 21
(Chinese Taipei) Hsu Y-c (Chinese Taipei) Pai Y-p | 17 | 21 | 11
(Thailand) D Aroonkesorn (Thailand) K Voravichitchaikul | 19 | 12
7 | (China) Yu Y (China) Zhong QX | 21 | 21
(Germany) J Goliszewski (Germany) C Nelte | 21 | 16 | 16
(Indonesia) K N Hanadia (Indonesia) D T Permatasari | 19 | 21 | 21
(Germany) I Herttrich (Germany) B Michels | 10 | 11
3 | (Denmark) C Pedersen (Denmark) K Rytter Juhl | 21 | 21
(Thailand) P Supajirakul (Thailand) S Taerattanachai | 21 | 21
(Indonesia) D Fitriani (Indonesia) N Melati | 18 | 15
(United States) E Lee (United States) P L Obanana | 13 | 10
6 | (Indonesia) N K Maheswari (Indonesia) G Polii | 21 | 21
PFQ | (Hong Kong) Poon L Y (Hong Kong) Tse Y S | 10 | 12
(South Korea) Chang Y-n (South Korea) Jung K-e | 21 | 21
(Thailand) J Kittiharakul (Thailand) R Prajongjai | 16 | 21 | 11
2 | (China) Luo Y (China) Luo Y | 21 | 9 | 21

Second Round
(India) J Gutta (India) A Ponnappa | 8 | 18
7 | (China) Yu Y (China) Zhong QX | 21 | 21
(Indonesia) K N Hanadia (Indonesia) D T Permatasari | 14 | 9
3 | (Denmark) C Pedersen (Denmark) K Rytter Juhl | 21 | 21
(Thailand) P Supajirakul (Thailand) S Taerattanachai | 20 | 17
6 | (Indonesia) N K Maheswari (Indonesia) G Polii | 22 | 21
(South Korea) Chang Y-n (South Korea) Jung K-e | 16 | 17
2 | (China) Luo Y (China) Luo Y | 21 | 21

Quarterfinals
7 | (China) Yu Y (China) Zhong QX | 21 | 10 | 21
3 | (Denmark) C Pedersen (Denmark) K Rytter Juhl | 18 | 21 | 16
6 | (Indonesia) N K Maheswari (Indonesia) G Polii | 21 | 23
2 | (China) Luo Y (China) Luo Y | 15 | 21

Semifinals
7 | (China) Yu Y (China) Zhong QX | 22 | 13 | 14
6 | (Indonesia) N K Maheswari (Indonesia) G Polii | 20 | 21 | 21

=== Finals ===
Semifinals
5 | (China) Ma Jin (China) Tang Yuanting | 10 | 14
8 | (China) Tang Jinhua (China) Tian Qing | 21 | 21
7 | (China) Yu Yang (China) Zhong Qianxin | 22 | 13 | 14
6 | (Indonesia) Nitya Krishinda Maheswari (Indonesia) Greysia Polii | 20 | 21 | 21

Final
8 | (China) Tang Jinhua (China) Tian Qing | 21 | 21
6 | (Indonesia) Nitya Krishinda Maheswari (Indonesia) Greysia Polii | 11 | 10

== Mixed doubles ==
=== Seeds ===
1. (China) Zhang Nan / Zhao Yunlei (Final)
2. (China) Xu Chen / Ma Jin (Champion)
3. (Indonesia) Tantowi Ahmad / Lilyana Natsir (Semifinals)
4. (Denmark) Joachim Fischer Nielsen / Christinna Pedersen (Semifinals)
5. (China) Liu Cheng / Bao Yixin (Quarterfinals)
6. (China) Lu Kai / Huang Yaqiong (Quarterfinals)
7. (England) Chris Adcock / Gabrielle Adcock (Quarterfinals)
8. (South Korea) Ko Sung-hyun / Kim Ha-na (Quarterfinals)

=== Top half ===
First Round
1 | (China) Zhang N (China) Zhao YL | 20 | 21 | 21
(South Korea) Yoo Y-s (South Korea) Chang Y-n | 22 | 15 | 17
(France) G Mittelheisser (France) A Fontaine | 20 | 16
(Indonesia) E Subaktiar (Indonesia) G E Widjaja | 22 | 21
7 | (England) C Adcock (England) G Adcock | 21 | 21
(Netherlands) J De Ruitter (Netherlands) S Barning | 16 | 12
(Indonesia) R Widianto (Indonesia) R P Dili | 21 | 21
(Germany) M Fuchs (Germany) B Michels | 19 | 16
3 | (Indonesia) T Ahmad (Indonesia) L Natsir | 26 | 21
(Hong Kong) Lee C H (Hong Kong) Chau H W | 24 | 14
(Japan) K Hayakawa (Japan) M Matsutomo | 21 | 17 | 21
(Indonesia) R Alexander (Indonesia) M D Oktaviani | 18 | 21 | 10
5 | (China) Liu C (China) Bao YX | 21 | 21
(Netherlands) J Arends (Netherlands) S Piek | 15 | 13
Q3 | (Indonesia) A Adistia (Indonesia) V Marissa | 21 | 21
(United States) P Chew (United States) J Subandhi | 12 | 18

Second Round
1 | (China) Zhang N (China) Zhao YL | 21 | 21
(Indonesia) E Subaktiar (Indonesia) G E Widjaja | 12 | 16
7 | (England) C Adcock (England) G Adcock | 21 | 21
(Indonesia) R Widianto (Indonesia) R P Dili | 17 | 15
3 | (Indonesia) T Ahmad (Indonesia) L Natsir | 21 | 21
(Japan) K Hayakawa (Japan) M Matsutomo | 12 | 16
5 | (China) Liu C (China) Bao YX | 21 | 17 | 21
Q3 | (Indonesia) A Adistia (Indonesia) V Marissa | 14 | 21 | 17

Quarterfinals
1 | (China) Zhang N (China) Zhao YL | 21 | 21
7 | (England) C Adcock (England) G Adcock | 12 | 13
3 | (Indonesia) T Ahmad (Indonesia) L Natsir | 21 | 21
5 | (China) Liu C (China) Bao YX | 15 | 18

Semifinals
1 | (China) Zhang N (China) Zhao YL | 16 | 21 | 21
3 | (Indonesia) T Ahmad (Indonesia) L Natsir | 21 | 15 | 18

=== Bottom half ===
First Round
(Hong Kong) Chan Y L (Hong Kong) Tse Y S | 21 | 21
(Thailand) S Prapakamol (Thailand) S Taerattanachai | 17 | 16
(Indonesia) M Kido (Indonesia) P Z Bernadeth | 14 | 19
8 | (South Korea) Ko S-h (South Korea) Kim H-n | 21 | 21
(Indonesia) P Jordan (Indonesia) D Susanto | 21 | 21
Q2 | (Germany) M Lamsfuss (Germany) I Herttrich | 16 | 17
(Russia) V Durkin (Russia) N Vislova | 12 | 15
4 | (Denmark) J Fischer Nielsen (Denmark) C Pedersen | 21 | 21
Q1 | (South Korea) Lee Y-d (South Korea) Lee S-h | 21 | 19 | 16
(Denmark) M Pieler Kolding (Denmark) K Rytter Juhl | 18 | 21 | 21
Q4 | (South Korea) Shin B-c (South Korea) Chae Y-j | 16 | 11
6 | (China) Lu K (China) Huang YQ | 21 | 21
(South Korea) Choi S-g (South Korea) Eom H-w | 21 | 21
(Republic of Ireland) S Magee (Republic of Ireland) C Magee | 16 | 14
(Indonesia) A E Prasetya (Indonesia) A Saufika | 13 | 17
2 | (China) Xu C (China) Ma J | 21 | 21

Second Round
(Hong Kong) Chan Y L (Hong Kong) Tse Y S | 18 | 15
8 | (South Korea) Ko S-h (South Korea) Kim H-n | 21 | 21
(Indonesia) P Jordan (Indonesia) D Susanto | 17 | 17
4 | (Denmark) J Fischer Nielsen (Denmark) C Pedersen | 21 | 21
(Denmark) M Pieler Kolding (Denmark) K Rytter Juhl | 17 | 22 | 16
6 | (China) Lu K (China) Huang YQ | 21 | 20 | 21
(South Korea) Choi S-g (South Korea) Eom H-w | 21 | 12 | 13
2 | (China) Xu C (China) Ma J | 12 | 21 | 21

Quarterfinals
8 | (South Korea) Ko S-h (South Korea) Kim H-n | 19 | 13
4 | (Denmark) J Fischer Nielsen (Denmark) C Pedersen | 21 | 21
6 | (China) Lu K (China) Huang YQ | 13 | 12
2 | (China) Xu C (China) Ma J | 21 | 21

Semifinals
4 | (Denmark) J Fischer Nielsen (Denmark) C Pedersen | 15 | 19
2 | (China) Xu C (China) Ma J | 21 | 21

=== Finals ===
Semifinals
1 | (China) Zhang Nan (China) Zhao Yunlei | 16 | 21 | 21
3 | (Indonesia) Tontowi Ahmad (Indonesia) Lilyana Natsir | 21 | 15 | 18
4 | (Denmark) Joachim Fischer Nielsen (Denmark) Christinna Pedersen | 15 | 19
2 | (China) Xu Chen (China) Ma Jin | 21 | 21

Final
1 | (China) Zhang Nan (China) Zhao Yunlei | 17 | 16
2 | (China) Xu Chen (China) Ma Jin | 21 | 21

| Preceded by 2014 Indonesia Super Series Premier | Indonesia Open | Succeeded by 2016 Indonesia Super Series Premier |
| Preceded by 2015 Australian Super Series | BWF Super Series; 2015 BWF Season | Succeeded by 2015 Japan Super Series |
