= Badminton at the 2015 European Games – Women's doubles =

Badminton's women's doubles at the 2015 European Games
- Venue: Baku Sports Hall
- Dates: 22–27 June
- Competitors: 32 from 16 nations

Medalists
gold medal	Gabriela Stoeva; Stefani Stoeva	Bulgaria
silver medal	Evgeniya Kosetskaya; Ekaterina Bolotova	Russia
bronze medal	Lena Grebak; Maria Helsbøl	Denmark
bronze medal	Özge Bayrak; Neslihan Yiğit	Turkey

The badminton women's doubles tournament at the 2015 European Games took place from 22 to 27 June.

== Competition format ==
The doubles tournaments will be played with 16 pairs, initially playing in four groups of four, before the top two from each group qualify for an 8-pair knock-out stage.

=== Schedule ===
All times are in AZST (UTC+05).

Start time	Session
22 June 9:00	Group stage, matchday 1
23 June 9:00	Group stage, matchday 2
24 June 9:00	Group stage, matchday 3
25 June 10:00	Quarter-finals
26 June 18:00	Semi-finals
27 June 18:00	Final

== Seeds ==
Seeds for all badminton events at the inaugural European Games were announced on 29 May.

1. Gabriela Stoeva and Stefani Stoeva (BUL) (Gold medal)
2. Evgeniya Kosetskaya and Ekaterina Bolotova (RUS) (Silver medalists)
3. Neslihan Yiğit and Özge Bayrak (TUR) (Bronze medalists)
4. Lena Grebak and Maria Helsbøl (DEN) (Bronze medalists)

== Results ==
The group stage draws were held on 2 June.

=== Group stage ===
==== Group A ====
Pos	Team	Pld	W	L	GF	GA	GD	Qualification
1	Gabriela Stoeva / Stefani Stoeva (BUL) [1]	3	3	0	6	0	+6	Qualification to knock-out stage
2	Steffi Annys / Flore Vandenhoucke (BEL)	3	2	1	4	2	+2	Qualification to knock-out stage
3	Natalya Voytsekh / Yelyzaveta Zharka (UKR)	3	1	2	2	4	−2	
4	Ieva Pope / Kristīne Šefere (LAT)	3	0	3	0	6	−6	

Source: Baku 2015

==== Group B ====
Pos	Team	Pld	W	L	GF	GA	GD	Qualification
1	Ekaterina Bolotova / Evgeniya Kosetskaya (RUS) [2]	3	3	0	6	0	+6	Qualification to knock-out stage
2	Lorraine Baumann / Audrey Fontaine (FRA)	3	2	1	4	2	+2	Qualification to knock-out stage
3	Mathilda Lindholm / Jenny Nyström (FIN)	3	1	2	2	4	−2	
4	Sara Boyle / Rachael Darragh (IRL)	3	0	3	0	6	−6	

Source: Baku 2015

==== Group C ====
Pos	Team	Pld	W	L	GF	GA	GD	Qualification
1	Özge Bayrak / Neslihan Yiğit (TUR) [3]	3	3	0	6	0	+6	Qualification to knock-out stage
2	Laura Molina / Haideé Ojeda (ESP)	3	2	1	4	2	+2	Qualification to knock-out stage
3	Šárka Křížková / Kateřina Tomalová (CZE)	3	1	2	2	4	−2	
4	Katarina Galenić / Staša Poznanović (CRO)	3	0	3	0	6	−6	

Source: Baku 2015

==== Group D ====
Pos	Team	Pld	W	L	GF	GA	GD	Qualification
1	Lena Grebak / Maria Helsbøl (DEN) [4]	3	3	0	6	0	+6	Qualification to knock-out stage
2	Carola Bott / Jennifer Karnott (GER)	3	2	1	4	3	+1	Qualification to knock-out stage
3	Kristin Kuuba / Helina Rüütel (EST)	3	1	2	3	4	−1	
4	Anastasiya Cherniavskaya / Alesia Zaitsava (BLR)	3	0	3	0	6	−6	

Source: Baku 2015

=== Knock-out stage ===
Quarter-finals
1	G Stoeva; S Stoeva (BUL)	21	21
C Bott; J Karnott (GER)	11	10
3	Ö Bayrak; N Yiğit (TUR)	21	21
L Baumann; A Fontaine (FRA)	11	19
S Annys; F Vandenhoucke (BEL)	21	12	10
4	L Grebak; M Helsbøl (DEN)	14	21	21
L Molina; H Ojeda (ESP)	15	11
2	E Bolotova; E Kosetskaya (RUS)	21	21

Semi-finals
1	G Stoeva; S Stoeva (BUL)	21	21
3	Ö Bayrak; N Yiğit (TUR)	14	9
4	L Grebak; M Helsbøl (DEN)	14	21	9
2	E Bolotova; E Kosetskaya (RUS)	21	14	21

Final
1	G Stoeva; S Stoeva (BUL)	21	23
2	E Bolotova; E Kosetskaya (RUS)	12	21
