= Alyssa Lim =

English badminton player (born 1991)

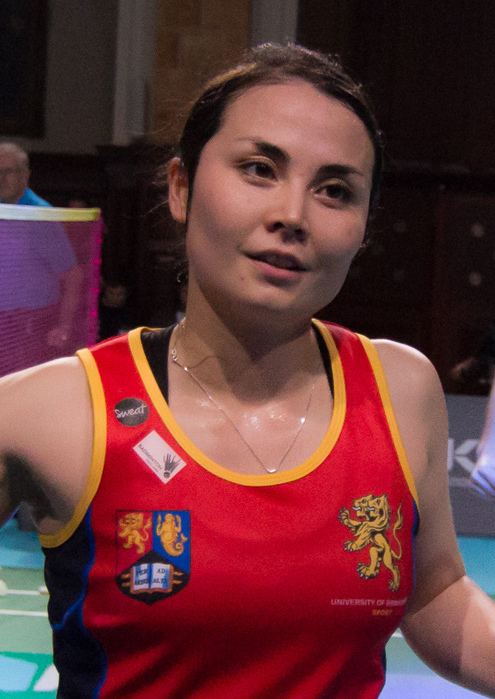
- Lim in 2014

Personal information
- Born: 23 January 1991 (age 35) Milton Keynes, England

Sport
- Country: England
- Sport: Badminton

Women's
- Highest ranking: 67 (WS) 13 Jun 2013; 43 (WD) 31 Oct 2013
- BWF profile
Medal record
Women's badminton
Representing England
European Junior Championships
Bronze medal – third place	2009 Milan	Mixed team

Alyssa Lim (born 23 January 1991) is a female badminton player from England.

== Achievements ==
=== BWF International Challenge/Series ===
Women's Doubles
Year	Tournament	Partner	Opponent	Score	Result
2011	Portugal International	(England) Helen Davies	(England) Alex Langley (England) Lauren Smith	21-14, 14-21, 17-21	(silver) Runner-up

Mixed Doubles
Year	Tournament	Partner	Opponent	Score	Result
2013	French International	(England) Marcus Ellis	(Scotland) Robert Blair (Scotland) Imogen Bankier	17-21, 17-21	(silver) Runner-up
2012	Swiss International	(England) Ben Stawski	(Germany) Peter Kaesbauer (Germany) Isabel Herttrich	18-21, 12-21	(silver) Runner-up

Commonwealth Youth Games tournament
BWF International Series tournament
