= Devi Tika Permatasari =

Indonesian badminton player (born 1987)

Personal information
- Born: 14 December 1987 (age 38) Kediri, East Java, Indonesia

Sport
- Country: Indonesia
- Sport: Badminton
- Handedness: Right

Women's & mixed doubles
- Highest ranking: 26 (WD 27 August 2015); 103 (XD 2 May 2013)
- BWF profile

Devi Tika Permatasari (born 14 December 1987) is an Indonesian badminton player. In the mixed doubles event, she won international titles at the 2009 and 2013 Indonesia International, and the 2012 Maldives International. In the women's doubles event, she was the champion of the Auckland International.

== Achievements ==
=== World University Championships ===
Women's doubles
Year	Venue	Partner	Opponent	Score	Result
2008	University of Minho, Campus de Gualtar; Braga, Portugal	(Indonesia) Nadya Melati	(Japan) Yui Nakahara (Japan) Mayu Sekiya	17–21, 21–10, 19–21	Bronze

=== BWF Grand Prix ===
The BWF Grand Prix had two levels, the Grand Prix and Grand Prix Gold. It was a series of badminton tournaments sanctioned by the Badminton World Federation (BWF) and played between 2007 and 2017.

Women's doubles
Year	Tournament	Partner	Opponent	Score	Result
2009	India Grand Prix	(Indonesia) Nadya Melati	(Japan) Misaki Matsutomo (Japan) Ayaka Takahashi	14–21, 21–15, 15–21	(silver) Runner-up
2014	Indonesian Masters	(Indonesia) Keshya Nurvita Hanadia	(Indonesia) Shendy Puspa Irawati (Indonesia) Vita Marissa	21–23, 13–21	(silver) Runner-up

BWF Grand Prix Gold tournament
BWF Grand Prix tournament

=== BWF International Challenge/Series ===
Women's doubles
Year	Tournament	Partner	Opponent	Score	Result
2006	Cheers Asian Satellite	(Indonesia) Shendy Puspa Irawati	(Indonesia) Nitya Krishinda Maheswari (Indonesia) Nadya Melati	21–15, 17–21, 17–21	(silver) Runner-up
2008	Singapore International	(Indonesia) Nadya Melati	(Singapore) Shinta Mulia Sari (Singapore) Yao Lei	21–14, 14–21, 13–21	(silver) Runner-up
2011	Indonesia International	(Indonesia) Keshya Nurvita Hanadia	(Indonesia) Suci Rizky Andini (Indonesia) Della Destiara Haris	16–21, 16–21	(silver) Runner-up
2012	Auckland International	(Indonesia) Keshya Nurvita Hanadia	(New Zealand) Amanda Brown (New Zealand) Kritteka Gregory	21–15, 21–18	(gold) Winner
2012	Victorian International	(Indonesia) Keshya Nurvita Hanadia	(Australia) Leanne Choo (Australia) Renuga Veeran	13–21, 11–21	(silver) Runner-up
2013	Portugal International	(Indonesia) Keshya Nurvita Hanadia	(Denmark) Lena Grebak (Denmark) Maria Helsbøl	19–21, 21–15, 17–21	(silver) Runner-up
2013	Welsh International	(Indonesia) Keshya Nurvita Hanadia	(Australia) He Tian Tang (Australia) Renuga Veeran	15–21, 12–21	(silver) Runner-up

Mixed doubles
Year	Tournament	Partner	Opponent	Score	Result
2006	Cheers Asian Satellite	(Indonesia) Lingga Lie	(Indonesia) Tontowi Ahmad (Indonesia) Yulianti	21–17, 24–22	(gold) Winner
2009	Indonesia International	(Indonesia) Riky Widianto	(Indonesia) Irfan Fadhilah (Indonesia) Weni Anggraini	21–12, 21–18	(gold) Winner
2012	Maldives International	(Wales) Raj Popat	(Sri Lanka) Hasitha Chanaka (Sri Lanka) Kavidi Sirimannage	21–17, 21–17	(gold) Winner
2013	Indonesia International	(Indonesia) Ardiansyah Putra	(Indonesia) Yodhi Satrio (Indonesia) Ni Ketut Mahadewi Istarani	19–21, 21–18, 21–19	(gold) Winner

BWF International Challenge tournament
BWF International Series tournament

== Performance timeline ==
=== Individual competitions ===
- Senior level

Event	2015
World Championships	R2

Tournament	BWF World Tour	Best
Tournament	2018	Best
Thailand Masters	R1	R2 (2016)
Malaysia Masters	R1	QF (2015, 2017)
Indonesia Masters	R1	F (2014)
Indonesia Open	R1	R2 (2014, 2015)
Indonesia Masters Super 100	R1 (WD); R2 (XD)	R2 (2018)

Tournament	BWF Superseries								Best
Tournament	2010	2011	2012	2013	2014	2015	2016	2017	Best
Indonesia Open	R1	A			R2	R2	R1 (WD); R1 (XD)	R1	R2 (2014, 2015)

Tournament	BWF Grand Prix and Grand Prix Gold									Best
Tournament	2009	2010	2011	2012	2013	2014	2015	2016	2017	Best
Malaysia Masters	A						QF	R2	QF (WD); R1 (XD)	QF (2015, 2017)
Syed Modi International	F									F (2009)
Thailand Masters	—N/a							R2	A	R2 (2016)
Indonesian Masters	—N/a	A	R1 (WD)	R1 (WD); QF (XD)	R2 (WD); R1 (XD)	F	R2	A	—N/a	F (2014)
