= Lena Grebak =

Danish badminton player

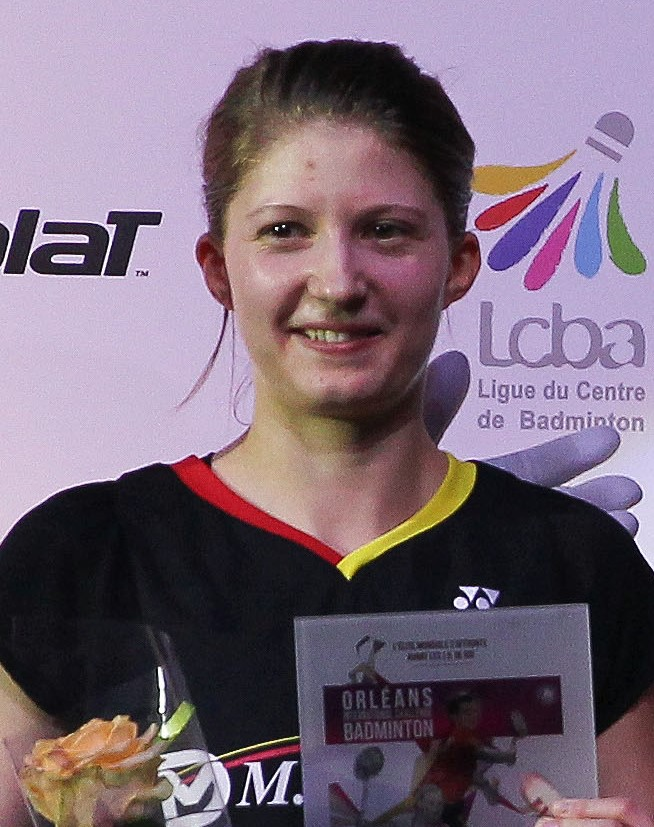
- Lena Grebak in 2016.

Personal information
- Born: 18 September 1991 (age 35) Køge, Denmark
- Height: 1.73 m (5 ft 8 in)
- Weight: 68 kg (150 lb)

Sport
- Country: Denmark
- Sport: Badminton
- Handedness: Right

Women's Doubles & Mixed Doubles
- Highest ranking: 38 (WD 13 March 2014); 27 (XD 24 November 2016)
- BWF profile
Medal record
Women's badminton
Representing Denmark
European Games
Bronze medal – third place	2015 Baku	Women's doubles
European Championships
Bronze medal – third place	2016 La Roche-sur-Yon	Mixed doubles
European Mixed Team Championships
Gold medal – first place	2015 Leuven	Mixed team
European Women's Team Championships
Gold medal – first place	2016 Kazan	Women's team
Gold medal – first place	2014 Basel	Women's team
European Junior Championships
Gold medal – first place	2009 Milan	Mixed team

Lena Grebak (born 18 September 1991) is a Danish badminton player. In 2015, she won the bronze medal at the European Games in the women's doubles event partnered with Maria Helsbøl. In 2016, she also won the bronze medal at the European Championships in the mixed doubles event partnered with Mathias Christiansen.

== Achievements ==
=== European Games ===
Women's doubles
Year	Venue	Partner	Opponent	Score	Result
2015	Baku Sports Hall, Baku, Azerbaijan	(Denmark) Maria Helsbøl	(Russia) Ekaterina Bolotova (Russia) Evgeniya Kosetskaya	14-21, 21–14, 9-21	Bronze

=== European Badminton Championships ===
Mixed oubles
Year	Venue	Partner	Opponent	Score	Result
2016	Vendéspace, La Roche-sur-Yon, France	(Denmark) Mathias Christiansen	(Denmark) Niclas Nøhr (Denmark) Sara Thygesen	21–15, 18–21, 17, 21	Bronze

=== BWF International Challenge/Series ===
Women's doubles
Year	Tournament	Partner	Opponent	Score	Result
2017	Swedish International	(Denmark) Alexandra Bøje	(Sweden) Clara Nistad (Sweden) Emma Wengberg	17-21, 22–24	(silver) Runner-up
2015	Iceland International	(Denmark) Maria Helsbøl	(Denmark) Emilie Juul Moller (Denmark) Cecilie Sentow	21–13, 21–12	(gold) Winner
2014	Irish Open	(Sweden) Emelie Fabbeke	(Denmark) Julie Finne-Ipsen (Denmark) Rikke Hansen	21-16, 21–14	(gold) Winner
2013	Kharkiv International	(Denmark) Maria Helsbøl	(Scotland) Imogen Bankier (Bulgaria) Petya Nedelcheva	11-21, 12–21	(silver) Runner-up
2013	Portugal International	(Denmark) Maria Helsbøl	(Indonesia) Keshya Nurvita Hanadia (Indonesia) Devi Tika Permatasari	21–19, 15–21, 21–17	(gold) Winner
2013	Finnish Open	(Denmark) Maria Helsbøl	(Scotland) Imogen Bankier (Bulgaria) Petya Nedelcheva	10-21, 22–24	(silver) Runner-up
2010	Cyprus International	(Denmark) Camilla Overgaard	(Russia) Romina Gabdullina (Russia) Evgeniya Kosetskaya	18-21, 9-21	(silver) Runner-up

Mixed doubles
Year	Tournament	Partner	Opponent	Score	Result
2016	Finnish International	(Denmark) Mathias Christiansen	(Denmark) Niclas Nøhr (Denmark) Sara Thygesen	18-21, 23–21, 21–16	(gold) Winner
2016	Orleans International	(Denmark) Mathias Christiansen	(Netherlands) Robin Tabeling (Netherlands) Samantha Barning	21-14, 21–13	(gold) Winner
2016	Austrian Open	(Denmark) Mathias Christiansen	(England) Matthew Nottingham (England) Emily Westwood	21-17, 21–17	(gold) Winner
2016	Swedish Masters	(Denmark) Mathias Christiansen	(Poland) Robert Mateusiak (Poland) Nadieżda Zięba	10-21, 13–21	(silver) Runner-up
2015	Irish Open	(Denmark) Mathias Christiansen	(Poland) Robert Mateusiak (Poland) Nadieżda Zięba	19–21, 21–18, 21–18	(gold) Winner
2015	Orleans International	(Denmark) Mathias Christiansen	(Malaysia) Chan Peng Soon (Malaysia) Goh Liu Ying	11–21, 21–17, 21–19	(gold) Winner
2014	Finnish Open	(Denmark) Anders Skaarup Rasmussen	(Sweden) Nico Ruponen (Sweden) Amanda Högström	22-24, 21–19, 21–13	(gold) Winner
2013	Belgian International	(Denmark) Anders Skaarup Rasmussen	(Netherlands) Jacco Arends (Netherlands) Selena Piek	21-18, 9-21, 21–15	(gold) Winner
2013	Spanish Open	(Denmark) Anders Skaarup Rasmussen	(Poland) Wojciech Szkudlarczyk (Poland) Agnieszka Wojtkowska	21–14, 21–18	(gold) Winner
2013	Denmark International	(Denmark) Anders Skaarup Rasmussen	(Denmark) Kim Astrup Sorensen (Denmark) Maria Helsbøl	21–16, 21–8	(gold) Winner
2013	Portugal International	(Denmark) Anders Skaarup Rasmussen	(Germany) Jones Ralfy Jansen (Indonesia) Keshya Nurvita Hanadia	16-21, 21–18, 16–21	(silver) Runner-up
2013	Finnish Open	(Denmark) Anders Skaarup Rasmussen	(Ukraine) Valeriy Atrashchenkov (Ukraine) Anna Kobceva	13-21, 21–15, 21–11	(gold) Winner
2010	Cyprus International	(Denmark) Niclas Nøhr	(Russia) Denis Grachev (Russia) Anastasia Chervyakova	21-13, 18–21, 21–12	(gold) Winner

BWF International Challenge tournament
BWF International Series tournament
BWF Future Series tournament
