= Keshya Nurvita Hanadia =

Indonesian badminton player (born 1988)

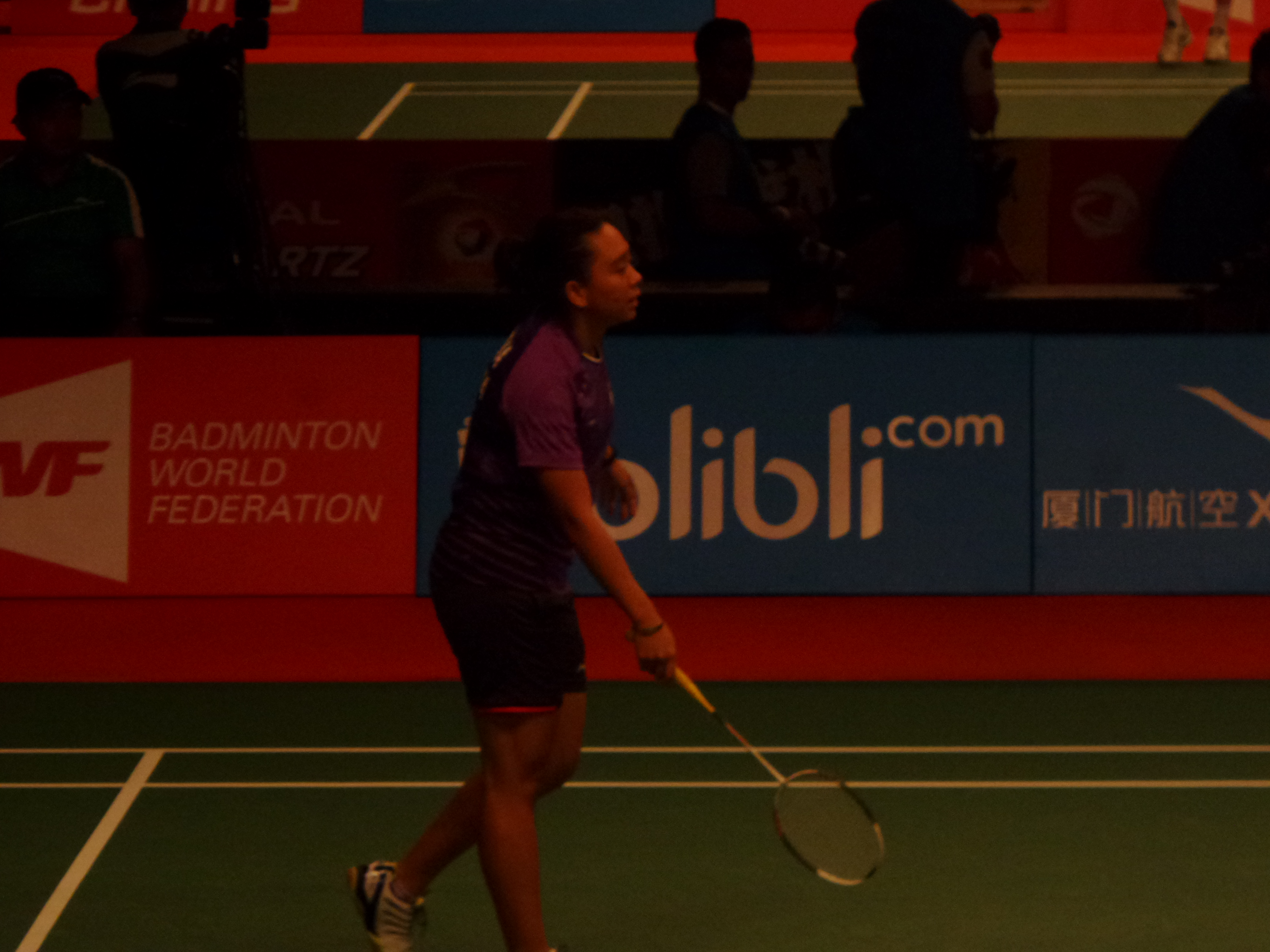

Personal information
- Born: 21 December 1988 (age 37) Tasikmalaya, West Java, Indonesia

Sport
- Country: Indonesia
- Sport: Badminton
- Handedness: Right

Women's & mixed doubles
- Highest ranking: 26 (WD 27 August 2015); 71 (XD 5 July 2012)
- BWF profile
Medal record
Women's badminton
Representing Indonesia
Asian Junior Championships
| Bronze medal – third place | 2006 Kuala Lumpur | Mixed team |

Keshya Nurvita Hanadia (born 21 December 1988) is an Indonesian badminton player. She won the 2008 Smiling Fish International in the mixed doubles with Lingga Lie. In 2011, she won in the same discipline at the Indonesia International together with Andhika Anhar. In the women's doubles event, she was the champion of the Auckland International.

== Achievements ==
=== BWF Grand Prix ===
The BWF Grand Prix had two levels, the Grand Prix and Grand Prix Gold. It was a series of badminton tournaments sanctioned by the Badminton World Federation (BWF) and played between 2007 and 2017.

Women's doubles
| Year | Tournament | Partner | Opponent | Score | Result |
|---|---|---|---|---|---|
| 2014 | Indonesian Masters | (Indonesia) Devi Tika Permatasari | (Indonesia) Vita Marissa (Indonesia) Shendy Puspa Irawati | 21-23, 13-21 | (silver) Runner-up |

BWF Grand Prix Gold tournament
BWF Grand Prix tournament

=== International Challenge/Series ===
Women's doubles
| Year | Tournament | Partner | Opponent | Score | Result |
|---|---|---|---|---|---|
| 2010 | Indonesia International | (Indonesia) Komala Dewi | (Indonesia) Suci Rizky Andini (Indonesia) Della Destiara Haris | 18–21, 21–12, 10–21 | (silver) Runner-up |
| 2011 | Indonesia International | (Indonesia) Devi Tika Permatasari | (Indonesia) Suci Rizky Andini (Indonesia) Della Destiara Haris | 16–21, 16–21 | (silver) Runner-up |
| 2012 | Auckland International | (Indonesia) Devi Tika Permatasari | (New Zealand) Amanda Brown (New Zealand) Kritteka Gregory | 21–15, 21–18 | (gold) Winner |
| 2012 | Victorian International | (Indonesia) Devi Tika Permatasari | (Australia) Leanne Choo (Australia) Renuga Veeran | 13–21, 11–21 | (silver) Runner-up |
| 2013 | Portugal International | (Indonesia) Devi Tika Permatasari | (Denmark) Lena Grebak (Denmark) Maria Helsbøl | 19–21, 21–15, 17–21 | (silver) Runner-up |
| 2013 | Welsh International | (Indonesia) Devi Tika Permatasari | (Australia) He Tian Tang (Australia) Renuga Veeran | 15–21, 12–21 | (silver) Runner-up |

Mixed doubles
| Year | Tournament | Partner | Opponent | Score | Result |
|---|---|---|---|---|---|
| 2008 | Smiling Fish International | (Indonesia) Lingga Lie | (Indonesia) Indra Viki Okvana (Indonesia) Natalia Christine Poluakan | 21–16, 13–21, 21–16 | (gold) Winner |
| 2011 | Malaysia International | (Indonesia) Andhika Anhar | (Malaysia) Tan Aik Quan (Malaysia) Lai Pei Jing | 18–21, 17–21 | (silver) Runner-up |
| 2011 | Smiling Fish International | (Indonesia) Andhika Anhar | (Malaysia) Tan Aik Quan (Malaysia) Lai Pei Jing | 21–19, 20–22, 11–21 | (silver) Runner-up |
| 2011 | Indonesia International | (Indonesia) Andhika Anhar | (Indonesia) Rendra Wijaya (Indonesia) Maria Elfira Christina | 21–15, 21–19 | (gold) Winner |
| 2012 | Victorian International | (Indonesia) Andhika Anhar | (Australia) Ross Smith (Australia) Renuga Veeran | 21–17, 21–12 | (gold) Winner |
| 2013 | Portugal International | (Germany) Jones Ralfy Jansen | (Denmark) Anders Skaarup Rasmussen (Denmark) Lena Grebak | 21–16, 18–21, 21–16 | (gold) Winner |

BWF International Challenge tournament
BWF International Series tournament

== Performance timeline ==
Key

| W | Won | F | Finalist | SF | Semi-finalist |
| QF | Quarter-finalist | #R | Rounds 4, 3, 2, 1 | RR | Round-robin stage |
| Q# | Qualification round | A | Absent | w/d | Withdrew |
| G | Gold | S | Silver | B | Bronze |
| NH | Not held | N/A | Not applicable | DNQ | Did not qualify |

=== Individual competitions ===
- Senior level

| Event | 2015 |
|---|---|
| World Championships | 2R |

| Tournament | BWF World Tour | Best |
| Tournament | 2018 | Best |
|---|---|---|
| Thailand Masters | 1R | 2R ('16) |
| Malaysia Masters | 1R | QF ('15, '17) |
| Indonesian Masters | 1R | F ('14) |
| Indonesia Open | 1R | 2R ('14, '15) |
| Indonesia Masters Super 100 | 1R | 1R ('18) |

| Tournament | BWF Superseries | | | | | | | | | Best |
| Tournament | 2009 | 2010 | 2011 | 2012 | 2013 | 2014 | 2015 | 2016 | 2017 | Best |
|---|---|---|---|---|---|---|---|---|---|---|
| Indonesia Open | 1R | 1R | A | | | 2R | 2R | 1R | 1R | 2R ('14, '15) |

| Tournament | BWF Grand Prix and Grand Prix Gold | | | | | | | | Best |
| Tournament | 2010 | 2011 | 2012 | 2013 | 2014 | 2015 | 2016 | 2017 | Best |
|---|---|---|---|---|---|---|---|---|---|
| Malaysia Masters | 1R | A | | | | QF | 2R | QF | QF ('15, '17) |
| Thailand Masters | NH | | | | | | 2R (WD) | 1R (XD) | 2R ('16) |
| Indonesian Masters | QF (WD) | 1R (WD); 1R (XD) | 1R (WD); 1R (XD) | 2R (WD); 1R (XD) | F | 2R | A | NH | F ('14) |
