= Maria Helsbøl =

Danish badminton player (born 1989)

Personal information
- Born: 17 September 1989 (age 37) Lejre, Denmark
- Height: 1.73 m (5 ft 8 in)
- Weight: 64 kg (141 lb)

Sport
- Country: Denmark
- Sport: Badminton

Women's & mixed doubles
- Highest ranking: 16 (WD) 26 May 2014); 22 (XD 5 December 2013)
- BWF profile
Medal record
Women's badminton
Representing Denmark
European Games
Bronze medal – third place	2015 Baku	Women's doubles
European Mixed Team Championships
Gold medal – first place	2015 Leuven	Mixed team
European Women's Team Championships
Gold medal – first place	2014 Basel	Women's team
Silver medal – second place	2012 Amsterdam	Women's team

Maria Helsbøl (born 17 September 1989) is a Danish badminton player. She was the bronze medalists at the 2015 European Games in the women's doubles event partnered with Lena Grebak. Helsbøl joined the national squad that won the European Women's Team Championships in 2014 and European Mixed Team Championships in 2015.

== Achievements ==
=== European Games ===
Women's doubles
Year	Venue	Partner	Opponent	Score	Result
2015	Baku Sports Hall; Baku, Azerbaijan	(Denmark) Lena Grebak	(Russia) Ekaterina Bolotova (Russia) Evgeniya Kosetskaya	14–21, 21–14, 9–21	Bronze

=== BWF International Challenge/Series ===
Women's doubles
Year	Tournament	Partner	Opponent	Score	Result
2015	Iceland International	(Denmark) Lena Grebak	(Denmark) Emilie Juul Moller (Denmark) Cecilie Sentow	21–13, 21–12	(gold) Winner
2013	Kharkiv International	(Denmark) Lena Grebak	(Scotland) Imogen Bankier (Bulgaria) Petya Nedelcheva	11–21, 12–21	(silver) Runner-up
2013	Portugal International	(Denmark) Lena Grebak	(Indonesia) Keshya Nurvita Hanadia (Indonesia) Devi Tika Permatasari	21–19, 15–21, 21–17	(gold) Winner
2013	Finnish Open	(Denmark) Lena Grebak	(Scotland) Imogen Bankier (Bulgaria) Petya Nedelcheva	10–21, 22–24	(silver) Runner-up
2011	Denmark International	(Denmark) Anne Skelbæk	(Denmark) Line Damkjaer Kruse (Denmark) Marie Roepke	14–21, 14–21	(silver) Runner-up
2010	Irish International	(Denmark) Anne Skelbæk	(England) Mariana Agathangelou (England) Heather Olver	12–21, 21–12, 21–15	(gold) Winner
2010	Czech International	(Denmark) Anne Skelbæk	(Netherlands) Selena Piek (Netherlands) Iris Tabeling	20–22, 21–15, 7–21	(silver) Runner-up
2010	Dutch International	(Denmark) Anne Skelbæk	(Netherlands) Samantha Barning (Netherlands) Eefje Muskens	8–21, 18–21	(silver) Runner-up
2009	Irish International	(Denmark) Anne Skelbæk	(England) Mariana Agathangelou (England) Heather Olver	13–21, 19–21	(silver) Runner-up
2009	Czech International	(Denmark) Anne Skelbæk	(Switzerland) Marion Gruber (Switzerland) Sabrina Jaquet	21–14, 21–10	(gold) Winner
2008	Cyprus International	(Denmark) Anne Skelbæk	(Poland) Natalia Pocztowiak (Poland) Aleksandra Walaszek	21–12, 21–17	(gold) Winner
2008	Hellas International	(Denmark) Anne Skelbæk	(Turkey) Ezgi Epice (Turkey) Aprilsasi Putri Lejarsar Variella	21–19, 21–19	(gold) Winner
2007	Hellas International	(Denmark) Anne Skelbæk	(Bulgaria) Diana Dimova (Bulgaria) Petya Nedelcheva	14–21, 15–21	(silver) Runner-up

Mixed doubles
Year	Tournament	Partner	Opponent	Score	Result
2013	Kharkiv International	(Denmark) Kim Astrup	(Scotland) Robert Blair (Scotland) Imogen Bankier	22–20, 9–21, 18–21	(silver) Runner-up
2013	Denmark International	(Denmark) Kim Astrup	(Denmark) Anders Skaarup Rasmussen (Denmark) Lena Grebak	16–21, 8–21	(silver) Runner-up
2011	Norwegian International	(Denmark) Rasmus Bonde	(Republic of Ireland) Sam Magee (Republic of Ireland) Chloe Magee	17–21, 16–21	(silver) Runner-up
2011	Denmark International	(Denmark) Rasmus Bonde	(Denmark) Mads Pieler Kolding (Denmark) Julie Houmann	13–21, 15–21	(silver) Runner-up
2008	Hellas International	(Denmark) Peter Mørk	(Chinese Taipei) Chen Hung-ling (Chinese Taipei) Hsieh Pei-chen	6–21, 9–21	(silver) Runner-up
2008	Cyprus International	(Denmark) Peter Mørk	(Denmark) Niklas Hoff (Denmark) Anne Skelbæk	21–14, 15–21, 26–24	(gold) Winner

BWF International Challenge tournament
BWF International Series tournament
