= 2012 Macau Open Grand Prix Gold =

Tournament details
- Dates: November 27, 2012 - December 2, 2012
- Total prize money: US$120,000
- Venue: Macau Forum
- Location: Macau

Champions
- Men's singles: (China) Chen Yuekun
- Women's singles: (China) Sun Yu
- Men's doubles: (Chinese Taipei) Lee Sheng-mu (Chinese Taipei) Tsai Chia-hsin
- Women's doubles: (South Korea) Eom Hye-won (South Korea) Chang Ye-na
- Mixed doubles: (Indonesia) Tontowi Ahmad (Indonesia) Liliyana Natsir

The 2012 Macau Open Grand Prix Gold was the fourteenth grand prix gold and grand prix tournament of the 2012 BWF Grand Prix Gold and Grand Prix. The tournament was held in Macau Forum, Macau from November 27, until December 2, 2012 and had a total purse of $120,000.

== Men's singles ==
=== Seeds ===
1. (Malaysia) Lee Chong Wei (withdrew)
2. (Japan) Kenichi Tago (first round)
3. (Indonesia) Taufik Hidayat (third round)
4. (Hong Kong) Hu Yun (second round)
5. (Hong Kong) Wong Wing Ki (quarter-finals)
6. (India) Kashyap Parupalli (first round)
7. (Indonesia) Dionysius Hayom Rumbaka (third round)
8. (Indonesia) Tommy Sugiarto (first round)
9. (Indonesia) Alamsyah Yunus (first round)
10. (India) Sourabh Varma (withdrew)
11. (Russia) Vladimir Ivanov (second round)
12. (India) Rajah Menuri Venkata Gurusaidutt (semi-finals)
13. (Thailand) Suppanyu Avihingsanon (second round)
14. (Indonesia) Andre Kurniawan Tedjono (second round)
15. (Chinese Taipei) Hsueh Hsuan-yi (first round)
16. (Singapore) Ashton Chen Yong Zhao (third round)

=== Finals ===
Quarterfinals
(India) Srikanth Kidambi	16	21	21
(Hong Kong) Wei Nan	21	19	19
(China) Gao Huan	21	21
5	(Hong Kong) Wong Wing Ki	19	13
(South Korea) Hong Ji-hoon	14	15
(China) Chen Yuekun	21	21
12	(India) R.M.V. Gurusaidutt	21	21
(Hong Kong) Chan Yan Kit	11	14

Semifinals
(India) Srikanth Kidambi	8	19
(China) Gao Huan	21	21
(China) Chen Yuekun	21	21
12	(India) R.M.V. Gurusaidutt	16	17

Final
(China) Gao Huan	9	17
(China) Chen Yuekun	21	21

=== Top half ===
==== Section 1 ====
First Round
PFQ	(Philippines) C Flores	14	8
(Chinese Taipei) Lin C-h	21	21
(Malaysia) Wong CH	21	21
Q5	(Australia) M Fariman	12	16
9	(Indonesia) A Yunus	10	18
(India) S Kidambi	21	21
Q6	(South Korea) Kim M-k	21	10	22
(India) P Kumar	18	21	20

Second Round
(Chinese Taipei) Lin C-h	13	8
(Malaysia) Wong CH	21	21
(India) S Kidambi	21	21
Q6	(South Korea) Kim M-k	13	11

Third Round
(Malaysia) Wong CH	17	21	12
(India) S Kidambi	21	15	21

==== Section 2 ====
First Round
8	(Indonesia) T Sugiarto	19	21	19
(Chinese Taipei) Teng S-h	21	11	21
(Thailand) P Vilailak	11	21	16
PFQ	(Chinese Taipei) Yang C-h	21	13	21
PFQ	(Hong Kong) Tam CH	15	17
(Japan) S Wada	21	21
(Hong Kong) Wei N	21	24
(Russia) V Malkov	16	22

Second Round
(Chinese Taipei) Teng S-h	21	21
PFQ	(Chinese Taipei) Yang C-h	17	16
(Japan) S Wada	13	25	4
(Hong Kong) Wei N	21	23	21

Third Round
(Chinese Taipei) Teng S-h	18	19
(Hong Kong) Wei N	21	21

==== Section 3 ====
First Round
3	(Indonesia) T Hidayat	23	21
(Chinese Taipei) Chu H-c	21	16
(United States) S Pongnairat	19	21	19
(Russia) I Sozonov	21	16	21
15	(Chinese Taipei) Hsueh H-y	17	16
(China) Qiao B	21	21
(China) Gao H	21	21
(Japan) K Momota	11	15

Second Round
3	(Indonesia) T Hidayat	22	21
(Russia) I Sozonov	20	13
(China) Qiao B	16	18
(China) Gao H	21	21

Third Round
3	(Indonesia) T Hidayat	13	21	10
(China) Gao H	21	11	21

==== Section 4 ====
First Round
5	(Hong Kong) Wong WK	21	21
(Chinese Taipei) Hsu S-w	17	10
(Malaysia) Loh WS	21	21
(Singapore) R Gonansa	16	11
14	(Indonesia) A Tedjono	21	21
(Chinese Taipei) Wan C-h	14	12
(Russia) N Khakimov	11	15
(Thailand) T Saensomboonsuk	21	21

Second Round
5	(Hong Kong) Wong WK	21	21
(Malaysia) Loh WS	16	10
14	(Indonesia) A Tedjono	19	11
(Thailand) T Saensomboonsuk	21	21

Third Round
5	(Hong Kong) Wong WK	21	12	21
(Thailand) T Saensomboonsuk	19	21	18

=== Bottom half ===
==== Section 5 ====
First Round
(South Korea) Hong J-h	21	21
Q8	(Malaysia) Goh GC	12	14
(Malaysia) N Ayub	8	10
13	(Thailand) S Avihingsanon	21	21
Q2	(Thailand) P Thongnuam	13	17
(Thailand) P Poodchalat	21	21
(United States) Lee HL	4
6	(India) K Parupalli	3^{r}

Second Round
(South Korea) Hong J-h	21	21
13	(Thailand) S Avihingsanon	10	14
(Thailand) P Poodchalat	21	20	21
(United States) Lee HL	15	22	16

Third Round
(South Korea) Hong J-h	21	21
(Thailand) P Poodchalat	15	13

==== Section 6 ====
First Round
(Indonesia) R Subagja	21	21
Q4	(Chinese Taipei) Tsai M-j	14	16
(Singapore) Huang C	21	12	21
11	(Russia) V Ivanov	18	21	23
(China) Chen YK	21	21
(New Zealand) J Wu	6	13
(Malaysia) Z Zulkiffli	21	11	16
4	(Hong Kong) Hu Y	12	21	21

Second Round
(Indonesia) R Subagja	21	17
11	(Russia) V Ivanov	19	4^{r}
(China) Chen YK	21	22
4	(Hong Kong) Hu Y	15	20

Third Round
(Indonesia) R Subagja	12	17
(China) Chen YK	21	21

==== Section 7 ====
First Round
(Norway) M Myhre	19	9
(Chinese Taipei) Cheng P-w	21	21
Q3	(Japan) Y Kaneko	21	17	19
12	(India) R Gurusaidutt	17	21	21
(Indonesia) W Prasetyo	21	16	21
(Hong Kong) Ng KL	18	21	16
Q7	(South Korea) Choi Y-w	17	7
7	(Indonesia) D Rumbaka	21	21

Second Round
(Chinese Taipei) Cheng P-w	10	14
12	(India) R Gurusaidutt	21	21
(Indonesia) W Prasetyo	21	13	14
7	(Indonesia) D Rumbaka	15	21	21

Third Round
12	(India) R Gurusaidutt	21	21
7	(Indonesia) D Rumbaka	13	18

==== Section 8 ====
First Round
(Malaysia) Chan KB	18	11
(Chinese Taipei) Shih K-c	21	21
(Chinese Taipei) Wang T-w	4	19
16	(Singapore) A Chen	21	21
Q1	(Chinese Taipei) Yang C-c	21	10	21
PFQ	(Chinese Taipei) Lai C-c	17	21	17
(Hong Kong) Chan YK	21	22
2	(Japan) K Tago	13	20

Second Round
(Chinese Taipei) Shin K-c	17	21	18
16	(Singapore) A Chen	21	16	21
Q1	(Chinese Taipei) Yang C-c	14	21	10
(Hong Kong) Chan YK	21	18	21

Third Round
16	(Singapore) A Chen	15	15
(Hong Kong) Chan YK	21	21

== Women's singles ==
=== Seeds ===
1. (Chinese Taipei) Tai Tzu-ying (second round)
2. (Japan) Minatsu Mitani (withdrew)
3. (China) Han Li (quarter-finals)
4. (Hong Kong) Yip Pui Yin (quarter-finals)
5. (Chinese Taipei) Pai Hsiao-ma (semi-finals)
6. (Hong Kong) Chan Tsz Ka (first round)
7. (Thailand) Busanan Ongbumrungpan (final)
8. (Indonesia) Adriyanti Firdasari (second round)

=== Finals ===
Semifinals
Q2	(China) Sun Yu	21	21
Q3	(China) Deng Xuan	15	10
7	(Thailand) Busanan Ongbumrungpan	21	21
5	(Chinese Taipei) Pai Hsiao-ma	11	7

Final
Q2	(China) Sun Yu	21	21
7	(Thailand) Busanan Ongbumrungpan	19	8

=== Top half ===
==== Section 1 ====
First Round
1	(Chinese Taipei) Tai T-y	21	21
(Indonesia) M Kusumastuti	19	13
(Japan) K Ito	23	21
(Hong Kong) Cheung NY	21	19
8	(Indonesia) A Firdasari	21	21
(India) A Pantawane	19	15
Q2	(China) Sun Y	21	21
(Malaysia) L Cheah	5	7

Second Round
1	(Chinese Taipei) Tai T-y	14	21	18
(Japan) K Ito	21	13	21
8	(Indonesia) A Firdasari	14	21	12
Q2	(China) Sun Y	21	15	21

Quarterfinals
(Japan) K Ito	9	9
Q2	(China) Sun Y	21	21

==== Section 2 ====
First Round
3	(China) Han L	21	21
(India) P Thulasi	13	7
(Singapore) Xing AY	21	21
(Chinese Taipei) Pai Y-p	13	5
6	(Hong Kong) Chan TK	2	17
Q3	(China) Deng X	21	21
(Chinese Taipei) Cheng C-y	18	21	21
(Indonesia) M Nadhir	21	12	19

Second Round
3	(China) Han L	21	21
(Singapore) Xing AY	6	19
Q3	(China) Deng X	21	21
(Chinese Taipei) Cheng C-y	15	5

Quarterfinals
3	(China) Han L	19	14
Q3	(China) Deng X	21	21

=== Bottom half ===
==== Section 3 ====
First Round
(Malaysia) Tee JY	14	13
(Indonesia) B Manuputty	21	21
(Russia) R Gabdullina	21	12	10
7	(Thailand) B Ongbumrungpan	18	21	21
Q1	(Chinese Taipei) Lee C-h	17	22
Q4	(Japan) S Yamamoto	21	24
(Singapore) Chen JY	13	15
4	(Hong Kong) Yip PY	21	21

Second Round
(Indonesia) B Manuputty	22	8
7	(Thailand) B Ongbumrungpan	24	21
Q4	(Japan) S Yamamoto	21	15
4	(Hong Kong) Yip PY	23	21

Quarterfinals
7	(Thailand) B Ongbumrungpan	21	21
4	(Hong Kong) Yip PY	12	18

==== Section 4 ====
First Round
(United States) J Subandhi	20	11
(Chinese Taipei) Chang Y-l	22	21
(India) T Lad	11	17
5	(Chinese Taipei) Pai H-m	21	21
(Indonesia) L Fanetri	21	21
(Chinese Taipei) Lin Y-c	19	14
(Hong Kong) Mong KY	21	12	19
PFQ	(Chinese Taipei) Hsu Y-c	14	21	21

Second Round
(Chinese Taipei) Chang Y-l	17	12
5	(Chinese Taipei) Pai H-m	21	21
(Indonesia) L Fanetri	21	21
PFQ	(Chinese Taipei) Hsu Y-c	10	14

Quarterfinals
5	(Chinese Taipei) Pai H-m	21	13	21
(Indonesia) L Fanetri	7	21	19

== Men's doubles ==
=== Seeds ===
1. (Russia) Vladimir Ivanov / Ivan Sozonov (final)
2. (Indonesia) Ricky Karanda Suwardi / Muhammad Ulinnuha (second round)
3. (Indonesia) Yonathan Suryatama / Hendra Aprida Gunawan (second round)
4. (Malaysia) Gan Teik Chai / Ong Soon Hock (first round)
5. (Indonesia) Markis Kido / Alvent Yulianto (semi-finals)
6. (Indonesia) Andrei Adistia / Christopher Rusdianto (first round)
7. (Indonesia) Marcus Fernaldi Gideon / Agripinna Prima Rahmanto Putra (quarter-finals)
8. (China) Li Gen / Zhang Nan (quarter-finals)

=== Finals ===
Semifinals
1	(Russia) Vladimir Ivanov (Russia) Ivan Sozonov	17	21	21
5	(Indonesia) Markis Kido (Indonesia) Alvent Yulianto	21	10	19
Q2	(South Korea) Shin Baek-cheol (South Korea) Yoo Yeon-seong	9	21	16
(Chinese Taipei) Lee Sheng-mu (Chinese Taipei) Tsai Chia-hsin	21	18	21

Final
1	(Russia) Vladimir Ivanov (Russia) Ivan Sozonov	21	17	16
(Chinese Taipei) Lee Sheng-mu (Chinese Taipei) Tsai Chia-hsin	14	21	21

=== Top half ===
==== Section 1 ====
First Round
1	(Russia) V Ivanov (Russia) I Sozonov	23	16	21
(Chinese Taipei) Chen C-j (Chinese Taipei) Huang P-y	21	21	19
(Chinese Taipei) Chen H-l (Chinese Taipei) Lu C-p	15	21	16
(Indonesia) B Angriawan (Indonesia) Y Sugiarto	21	19	21
7	(Indonesia) M Gideon (Indonesia) A Putra	21	21
(India) P Chopra (India) A Dewalkar	8	16
(Chinese Taipei) Liang J-w (Chinese Taipei) Liao K-h	21	21
(Singapore) T Yeo (Singapore) Liu Y	9	16

Second Round
1	(Russia) V Ivanov (Russia) I Sozonov	21	21
(Indonesia) B Angriawan (Indonesia) Y Sugiarto	14	18
7	(Indonesia) M Gideon (Indonesia) A Putra	22	22	21
(Chinese Taipei) Liang J-w (Chinese Taipei) Liao K-h	20	24	16

Quarterfinals
1	(Russia) V Ivanov (Russia) I Sozonov	21	21
7	(Indonesia) M Gideon (Indonesia) A Putra	14	16

==== Section 2 ====
First Round
3	(Indonesia) Y Suryatama (Indonesia) H Gunawan	21	21
(Malaysia) Chan PS (Malaysia) Lim KW	15	17
Q3	(Chinese Taipei) Liao C-c (Chinese Taipei) Lin Y-j	16	15
(Malaysia) V Mawan (Malaysia) F Tazari	21	21
5	(Indonesia) M Kido (Indonesia) A Yulianto	21	13	21
(Hong Kong) Chan YL (Hong Kong) Wong WH	16	21	15
(Hong Kong) Lee CH (Hong Kong) Leung CY	18	17
(Indonesia) H Faisal (Indonesia) P Rhoma	21	21

Second Round
3	(Indonesia) Y Suryatama (Indonesia) H Gunawan	21	20	11
(Malaysia) V Mawan (Malaysia) F Tazari	14	22	21
5	(Indonesia) M Kido (Indonesia) A Yulianto	21	21
(Indonesia) H Faisal (Indonesia) P Rhoma	16	8

Quarterfinals
(Malaysia) V Mawan (Malaysia) F Tazari	15	27
5	(Indonesia) M Kido (Indonesia) A Yulianto	21	29

=== Bottom half ===
==== Section 3 ====
First Round
Q4	(Chinese Taipei) Huang C-e (Chinese Taipei) Lin C-y	12	11
Q2	(South Korea) Shin B-c (South Korea) Yoo Y-s	21	21
(Malaysia) Chooi KM (Malaysia) Ow YH	22	21
6	(Indonesia) A Adistia (Indonesia) C Rusdianto	20	19
(Russia) E Dremin (Russia) S Lunev	21	18	17
(India) T Kona (India) A Vishnu	12	21	21
(Philippines) R Estanislao (Philippines) P Vivas	21	18	21
4	(Malaysia) Gan TC (Malaysia) Ong SH	10	21	17

Second Round
Q2	(South Korea) Shin B-c (South Korea) Yoo Y-s	21	21
(Malaysia) Chooi KM (Malaysia) Ow YH	17	9
(India) T Kona (India) A Vishnu	21	19	22
(Philippines) R Estanislao (Philippines) P Vivas	15	21	24

Quarterfinals
Q2	(South Korea) Shin B-c (South Korea) Yoo Y-s	21	21
(Philippines) R Estanislao (Philippines) P Vivas	16	10

==== Section 4 ====
First Round
(Hong Kong) Chan TK (Hong Kong) Lo LK	21	21
(Malaysia) Kok ZY (Malaysia) Kong KZ	13	10
(United States) P Chew (United States) S Pongnairat	13	26
8	(China) Li G (China) Zhang N	21	28
(Chinese Taipei) Lee S-m (Chinese Taipei) Tsai C-h	21	21
Q1	(Japan) T Inoue (Japan) Y Kaneko	13	18
(Malaysia) Goh VS (Malaysia) Ong JG	21	17	15
2	(Indonesia) R Suwardi (Indonesia) M Ulinnuha	16	21	21

Second Round
(Hong Kong) Chan TK (Hong Kong) Lo LK	14	21	21
8	(China) Li G (China) Zhang N	21	17	23
(Chinese Taipei) Lee S-m (Chinese Taipei) Tsai C-h	21	21
2	(Indonesia) R Suwardi (Indonesia) M Ulinnuha	19	11

Quarterfinals
8	(China) Li G (China) Zhang N	16	21	15
(Chinese Taipei) Lee S-m (Chinese Taipei) Tsai C-h	21	19	21

== Women's doubles ==
=== Seeds ===
1. (South Korea) Eom Hye-won / Chang Ye-na (champions)
2. (Hong Kong) Poon Lok Yan / Tse Ying Suet (first round)
3. (Indonesia) Greysia Polii / Meiliana Jauhari (first round)
4. (Indonesia) Pia Zebadiah / Rizki Amelia Pradipta (semi-finals)
5. (Indonesia) Anneke Feinya Agustin / Nitya Krishinda Maheswari (quarter-finals)
6. (Malaysia) Vivian Hoo Kah Mun / Woon Khe Wei (second round)
7. (Thailand) Lam Narissapat / Saralee Thoungthongkam (first round)
8. (Sweden) Emma Wengberg / Emelie Lennartsson (quarter-finals)

=== Finals ===
Semifinals
1	(South Korea) Eom Hye-won (South Korea) Chang Ye-na	21	21
4	(Indonesia) Pia Zebadiah (Indonesia) Rizki Amelia Pradipta	19	14
(South Korea) Choi Hye-in (South Korea) Kim So-yeong	15	21	21
(Indonesia) Komala Dewi (Indonesia) Jenna Gozali	21	11	12

Final
1	(South Korea) Eom Hye-won (South Korea) Chang Ye-na	21	21
(South Korea) Choi Hye-in (South Korea) Kim So-yeong	18	16

=== Top half ===
==== Section 1 ====
First Round
1	(South Korea) Eom H-w (South Korea) Jang Y-n	21	21
(Chinese Taipei) Chen P-j (Chinese Taipei) Huang M-c	6	13
Q3	(Japan) N Shiozawa (Japan) S Yamamoto	14	14
(Japan) Y Fukushima (Japan) Y Miyauchi	21	21
6	(Malaysia) V Hoo (Malaysia) Woon KW	21	21
(India) A Balan (India) S Reddy	11	18
(Chinese Taipei) Wang P-r (Chinese Taipei) Kuo Y-w	21	22
Q2	(South Korea) Kim C-m (South Korea) Kim J-w	18	20

Second Round
1	(South Korea) Eom H-w (South Korea) Jang Y-n	21	21
(Japan) Y Fukushima (Japan) Y Miyauchi	13	19
6	(Malaysia) V Hoo (Malaysia) Woon KW	12	21	16
(Chinese Taipei) Wang P-r (Chinese Taipei) Kuo Y-w	21	18	21

Quarterfinals
1	(South Korea) Eom H-w (South Korea) Jang Y-n	21	21
(Chinese Taipei) Wang P-r (Chinese Taipei) Kuo Y-w	12	9

==== Section 2 ====
First Round
4	(Indonesia) P Zebadiah (Indonesia) R Pradipta	21	21
(Chinese Taipei) Hung S-h (Chinese Taipei) Lin Y-c	12	9
(Singapore) V Neo (Singapore) D Yuliana	21	21
(Chinese Taipei) Chang Y-l (Chinese Taipei) Tai C-c	17	12
8	(Sweden) E Wengberg (Sweden) E Lennartsson	21	21
Q1	(Chinese Taipei) Cheng C-y (Chinese Taipei) Lee C-h	8	10
(Hong Kong) Chan HY (Hong Kong) Chau HW	17	17
(Thailand) P Arkornsakul (Thailand) J Kittiharakul	21	21

Second Round
4	(Indonesia) P Zebadiah (Indonesia) R Pradipta	22	15	21
(Singapore) V Neo (Singapore) D Yuliana	20	21	17
8	(Sweden) E Wengberg (Sweden) E Lennartsson	21	21
(Thailand) P Arkornsakul (Thailand) J Kittiharakul	17	14

Quarterfinals
4	(Indonesia) P Zebadiah (Indonesia) R Pradipta	21	21
8	(Sweden) E Wengberg (Sweden) E Lennartsson	17	12

=== Bottom half ===
==== Section 3 ====
First Round
(Chinese Taipei) Chen H-h (Chinese Taipei) Lai C-w	21	22	21
Q4	(Hong Kong) Shek HY (Hong Kong) Yeung YK	16	24	12
(Malaysia) Chow MK (Malaysia) Lee MY	21	13	11
5	(Indonesia) A Agustin (Indonesia) N Maheswari	18	21	21
(South Korea) Choi H-i (South Korea) Kim S-y	21	21
(Thailand) P Krajangjit (Thailand) P Munkitamorn	9	9
(Macau) Wang R (Macau) Zhang ZB	21	24
3	(Indonesia) G Polii (Indonesia) M Jauhari	19	22

Second Round
(Chinese Taipei) Chen H-h (Chinese Taipei) Lai C-w	10	16
5	(Indonesia) A Agustin (Indonesia) N Maheswari	21	21
(South Korea) Choi H-i (South Korea) Kim S-y	21	21
(Macau) Wang R (Macau) Zhang ZB	14	14

Quarterfinals
5	(Indonesia) A Agustin (Indonesia) N Maheswari	16	16
(South Korea) Choi H-i (South Korea) Kim S-y	21	21

==== Section 4 ====
First Round
Q4	(Philippines) B Carlos (Philippines) D Magno	7	9
(Japan) A Tasaki (Japan) S Yamada	21	21
(Indonesia) K Dewi (Indonesia) J Gozali	21	21
7	(Thailand) L Narissapat (Thailand) S Thoungthongkam	16	18
(Thailand) R Chuthabunditkul (Thailand) C Julrattanamanee	21	21
(Chinese Taipei) Shuai P-l (Chinese Taipei) Wu T-j	15	12
(India) P Gadre (India) A Ponnappa	21	21
2	(Hong Kong) Poon LY (Hong Kong) Tse YS	19	19

Second Round
(Japan) A Tasaki (Japan) S Yamada	19	21	17
(Indonesia) K Dewi (Indonesia) J Gozali	21	19	21
(Thailand) R Chuthabunditkul (Thailand) C Julrattanamanee	23	19
(India) P Gadre (India) A Ponnappa	25	21

Quarterfinals
(Indonesia) K Dewi (Indonesia) J Gozali	21	12	21
(India) P Gadre (India) A Ponnappa	16	21	15

== Mixed doubles ==
=== Seeds ===
1. (Indonesia) Tontowi Ahmad / Liliyana Natsir (champions)
2. (Thailand) Sudket Prapakamol / Saralee Thoungthongkam (quarter-finals)
3. (Indonesia) Muhammad Rijal / Debby Susanto (final)
4. (Singapore) Danny Bawa Chrisnanta / Vanessa Neo Yu Yan (quarter-finals)
5. (South Korea) Yoo Yeon-seong / Chang Ye-na (first round)
6. (Indonesia) Riky Widianto / Richi Puspita Dili (semi-finals)
7. (United States) Phillip Chew / Jamie Subandhi (first round)
8. (Indonesia) Markis Kido / Pia Zebadiah (first round)

=== Finals ===
Semifinals
1	(Indonesia) Tontowi Ahmad (Indonesia) Liliyana Natsir	21	21
(China) Tao Jiaming (China) Tang Jinhua	18	18
3	(Indonesia) Muhammad Rijal (Indonesia) Debby Susanto	21	21
6	(Indonesia) Riky Widianto (Indonesia) Richi Puspita Dili	7	16

Final
1	(Indonesia) Tontowi Ahmad (Indonesia) Liliyana Natsir	21	14	21
3	(Indonesia) Muhammad Rijal (Indonesia) Debby Susanto	16	21	16

=== Top half ===
==== Section 1 ====
First Round
1	(Indonesia) T Ahmad (Indonesia) L Natsir	21	21
(Russia) V Durkin (Russia) N Vislova	18	8
(Malaysia) Tan AQ (Malaysia) Lai PJ	20	21	21
(Singapore) Liu Y (Singapore) Thng TT	22	19	18
8	(Indonesia) M Kido (Indonesia) P Zebadiah	15	19
(Chinese Taipei) Wang C-l (Chinese Taipei) Pai H-m	21	21
(India) T Kona (India) A Ponnappa	21	21
(Thailand) T Lapoe (Thailand) P Munkitamorn	18	17

Second Round
1	(Indonesia) T Ahmad (Indonesia) L Natsir	21	21
(Malaysia) Tan AQ (Malaysia) Lai PJ	17	14
(Chinese Taipei) Wang C-l (Chinese Taipei) Pai H-m	17	20
(India) T Kona (India) A Ponnappa	21	21

Quarterfinals
1	(Indonesia) T Ahmad (Indonesia) L Natsir	21	21
(India) T Kona (India) A Ponnappa	9	13

==== Section 2 ====
First Round
4	(Singapore) D Chrisnanta (Singapore) V Neo	19	21	21
(Indonesia) A Prasetya (Indonesia) G Widjaja	21	14	9
(India) A Dewalkar (India) P Gadre	4^{r}
(New Zealand) J Wu (Chinese Taipei) Chang Y-l	3
5	(South Korea) Yoo Y-s (South Korea) Chang Y-n	8	14
(China) Tao JM (China) Tang JH	21	21
(India) P Chopra (India) S Reddy	19	21	19
(Chinese Taipei) Lin Y-j (Chinese Taipei) Cheng C-y	21	11	21

Second Round
4	(Singapore) D Chrisnanta (Singapore) V Neo	21	21
(New Zealand) J Wu (Chinese Taipei) Chang Y-l	6	12
(China) Tao JM (China) Tang JH	21	21
(Chinese Taipei) Lin Y-j (Chinese Taipei) Cheng C-y	10	10

Quarterfinals
4	(Singapore) D Chrisnanta (Singapore) V Neo	21	21	16
(China) Tao JM (China) Tang JH	23	12	21

=== Bottom half ===
==== Section 3 ====
First Round
(Chinese Taipei) Liao M-c (Chinese Taipei) Chen H-h	16	23	22
(India) A Vishnu (India) A Balan	21	21	20
(Singapore) T Yeo (Singapore) D Yuliana	21	21
7	(United States) P Chew (United States) J Subandhi	17	18
(South Korea) Kim D-e (South Korea) Choi H-i	21	20
(Chinese Taipei) Lin C-y (Chinese Taipei) Wang P-r	23	22
Q4	(Chinese Taipei) Chen H-l (Chinese Taipei) Wu T-j	21	21	15
3	(Indonesia) M Rijal (Indonesia) D Susanto	23	19	21

Second Round
(Chinese Taipei) Liao M-c (Chinese Taipei) Chen H-h	21	9	17
(Singapore) T Yeo (Singapore) D Yuliana	6	21	21
(Chinese Taipei) Lin C-y (Chinese Taipei) Wang P-r	24	16	7
3	(Indonesia) M Rijal (Indonesia) D Susanto	22	21	21

Quarterfinals
(Singapore) T Yeo (Singapore) D Yuliana	18	18
3	(Indonesia) M Rijal (Indonesia) D Susanto	21	21

==== Section 4 ====
First Round
(Russia) S Lunev (Russia) E Dimova	21	21
(Hong Kong) Wong WH (Hong Kong) Chan HY	17	18
Q1	(Hong Kong) Chan YL (Hong Kong) Tse YS	21	13	15
6	(Indonesia) R Widianto (Indonesia) R Dili	16	21	21
(South Korea) Shin B-c (South Korea) Eom H-w	21	21
Q3	(Hong Kong) Lee CH (Hong Kong) Chau HW	14	15
Q2	(South Korea) Han T-s (South Korea) Kim S-y	13	19
2	(Thailand) S Prapakamol (Thailand) S Thoungthongkam	21	21

Second Round
(Russia) S Lunev (Russia) E Dimova	18	18
6	(Indonesia) R Widianto (Indonesia) R Dili	21	21
(South Korea) Shin B-c (South Korea) Eom H-w	18	15
2	(Thailand) S Prapakamol (Thailand) S Thoungthongkam	21	21

Quarterfinals
6	(Indonesia) R Widianto (Indonesia) R Dili	22	23	21
2	(Thailand) S Prapakamol (Thailand) S Thoungthongkam	20	25	15

Preceded by 2012 Bitburger Open Grand Prix Gold	BWF Grand Prix Gold and Grand Prix; 2012 season	Succeeded by 2012 Korea Open Grand Prix Gold
