= 2015 Chinese Taipei Open Grand Prix Gold =

Tournament details
- Dates: 14 – 19 July 2015
- Level: Grand Prix Gold
- Total prize money: US$200,000
- Venue: Taipei Arena
- Location: Taipei, Taiwan

Champions
- Men's singles: (China) Chen Long
- Women's singles: (China) Wang Yihan
- Men's doubles: (China) Fu Haifeng (China) Zhang Nan
- Women's doubles: (Indonesia) Nitya Krishinda Maheswari (Indonesia) Greysia Polii
- Mixed doubles: (South Korea) Ko Sung-hyun (South Korea) Kim Ha-na

The 2015 Chinese Taipei Open Grand Prix Gold was the ninth grand prix gold and grand prix tournament of the 2015 BWF Grand Prix and Grand Prix Gold. The tournament was held in Taipei Arena, Taipei, Taiwan July 14–19, 2015 and had a total purse of $200,000.

== Players by nation ==
Nation	First Round	Second Round	Third Round	Quarterfinals	Semifinals	Final
(Chinese Taipei)	21	5	2		1	1
(Indonesia)	12	7	2	3	3	1
(Japan)	10	6		4	1	
(Malaysia)	9	4		1		
(Hong Kong)	7	4		1	1	
(South Korea)	6	3	1	6	1	1
(Singapore)	5					
(Thailand)	4	6	1		1	
(France)	3					
(China)	2	1	1	3	2	2
(Finland)	2					
(India)	1	2				
(Denmark)	1	1		1		
(Vietnam)	1		1			
(Bulgaria)	1					
(Russia)	1					
(Netherlands)		1				
(New Zealand)		1				
(Estonia)		1				
(Ukraine)		1				

== Men's singles ==
=== Seeds ===
1. (China) Chen Long (champion)
2. (Denmark) Jan Ø. Jørgensen (quarter-final)
3. (India) Srikanth Kidambi (second round)
4. (China) Lin Dan (semi-final)
5. (Chinese Taipei) Chou Tien-chen (final)
6. (China) Wang Zhengming (third round)
7. (South Korea) Son Wan-ho (second round)
8. (China) Tian Houwei (first round)
9. (Hong Kong) Hu Yun (second round)
10. (Indonesia) Tommy Sugiarto (second round)
11. (Hong Kong) Wei Nan (semi-final)
12. (Indonesia) Dionysius Hayom Rumbaka (third round)
13. (Thailand) Tanongsak Saensomboonsuk (first round)
14. (Hong Kong) Wong Wing Ki (second round)
15. (Chinese Taipei) Hsu Jen-hao (third round)
16. (Japan) Takuma Ueda (first round)

=== Finals ===
Quarterfinals
1	(China) Chen Long	17	22	21
(Malaysia) Lee Chong Wei	21	20	13
Q7	(South Korea) Heo Kwang-hee	21	12	17
11	(Hong Kong) Wei Nan	14	21	21
(Indonesia) Anthony Sinisuka Ginting	7	20
4	(China) Lin Dan	21	22
5	(Chinese Taipei) Chou Tien-chen	20	21	21
2	(Denmark) Jan Ø. Jørgensen	22	14	16

Semifinals
1	(China) Chen Long	21	21
11	(Hong Kong) Wei Nan	18	9
4	(China) Lin Dan	19	21	16
5	(Chinese Taipei) Chou Tien-chen	21	18	21

Final
1	(China) Chen Long	15	21	21
5	(Chinese Taipei) Chou Tien-chen	21	9	6

=== Top half ===
==== Section 1 ====
First Round
1	(China) Chen L	23	21
(Malaysia) Goh SH	21	11
PFQ	(India) S Verma	20	21	21
PFQ	(Chinese Taipei) Kuo P-c	22	13	13
15	(Chinese Taipei) Hsu J-h	21	21
(France) B Leverdez	16	19
(Indonesia) J Christie	19	21	16
(Thailand) K Phetpradab	21	19	21

Second Round
1	(China) Chen L	21	21
PFQ	(India) S Verma	19	18
15	(Chinese Taipei) Hsu J-h	21	13	21
(Thailand) K Phetpradab	16	21	17

Third Round
1	(China) Chen L	21	21
15	(Chinese Taipei) Hsu J-h	16	2

==== Section 2 ====
First Round
6	(China) Wang ZM	22	14	21
(Finland) E Heino	20	21	11
(Japan) S Sasaki	15	21	16
(Malaysia) I Zainuddin	21	17	21
10	(Indonesia) T Sugiarto	21	21
(Hong Kong) Ng KL	8	16
(South Korea) Kim D-h	10	7
(Malaysia) Lee CW	21	21

Second Round
6	(China) Wang ZM	21	21
(Malaysia) I Zainuddin	18	15
10	(Indonesia) T Sugiarto	12	18
(Malaysia) Lee CW	21	21

Third Round
6	(China) Wang ZM	10	15
(Malaysia) Lee CW	21	21

==== Section 3 ====
First Round
3	(India) S Kidambi	21	21
(Chinese Taipei) Wang T-w	17	15
(Indonesia) I M Mustofa	21	21
(Chinese Taipei) Shih K-c	14	10
13	(Thailand) T Saensomboonsuk	14	15
Q7	(South Korea) Heo K-h	21	21
(Singapore) D Wong	21	16	17
(Estonia) R Must	16	21	21

Second Round
3	(India) S Kidambi	19	18
(Indonesia) I M Mustofa	21	21
Q7	(South Korea) Heo K-h	21	21
(Estonia) R Must	17	11

Third Round
(Indonesia) I M Mustofa	22	19	18
Q7	(South Korea) Heo K-h	20	21	21

==== Section 4 ====
First Round
7	(South Korea) Son W-h	21	21
(Indonesia) F A Kholik	11	8
Q2	(Malaysia) M Hashim	21	14	10
(South Korea) Jeon H-j	14	21	21
11	(Hong Kong) Wei N	13	21	21
Q6	(Chinese Taipei) Yang C-c	21	15	18
Q5	(Chinese Taipei) Wan C-h	16	18
Q1	(Chinese Taipei) Cheng P-w	21	21

Second Round
7	(South Korea) Son W-h	16	16
(South Korea) Jeon H-j	21	21
11	(Hong Kong) Wei N	21	21
Q1	(Chinese Taipei) Cheng P-w	19	14

Third Round
(South Korea) Jeon H-j	13	19
11	(Hong Kong) Wei N	21	21

=== Bottom half ===
==== Section 5 ====
First Round
Q3	(Indonesia) S H Rhustavito	23	21
(India) R. M. V. Gurusaidutt	21	17
(Malaysia) L Daren	11	16
12	(Indonesia) D HRumbaka	21	21
(Singapore) Loh KY	12	21	18
(Chinese Taipei) Lin Y-h	21	17	21
(Indonesia) A S Ginting	21	21
8	(China) Tian HW	13	14

Second Round
Q3	(Indonesia) S H Rhustavito	9	15
12	(Indonesia) D H Rumbaka	21	21
(Chinese Taipei) Lin Y-h	18	11
(Indonesia) A S Ginting	21	21

Third Round
12	(Indonesia) D H Rumbaka	16	14
(Indonesia) A S Ginting	21	21

==== Section 6 ====
First Round
(Malaysia) Chong WF	17	7
(Chinese Taipei) Lu C-h	21	21
(Ukraine) A Pochtarev	7
16	(Japan) T Ueda	2^{r}
(South Korea) Lee D-k	21	21
(Indonesia) S Santoso	19	16
PFQ	(Finland) K Koljonen	18	10
4	(China) Lin D	21	21

Second Round
(Chinese Taipei) Lu C-h	21	8	21
(Ukraine) A Pochtarev	18	21	11
(South Korea) Lee D-k	18	15
4	(China) Lin D	21	21

Third Round
(Chinese Taipei) Lu C-h	16	15
4	(China) Lin D	21	21

==== Section 7 ====
First Round
(Vietnam) Nguyen TM	15	21	21
(Indonesia) A K Tedjono	21	8	12
(Indonesia) S D Kuncoro	16	15
9	(Hong Kong) Hu Y	21	21
PFQ	(Indonesia) A Marteen	17	21	16
Q8	(Chinese Taipei) Lu C-y	21	12	21
(Malaysia) Tan CS	18	14
5	(Chinese Taipei) Chou T-c	21	21

Second Round
(Vietnam) Nguyen TM	22	21
9	(Hong Kong) Hu Y	20	3
Q8	(Chinese Taipei) Lu C-y	15	18
5	(Chinese Taipei) Chou T-c	21	21

Third Round
(Vietnam) Nguyen TM	12	14
5	(Chinese Taipei) Chou T-c	21	21

==== Section 8 ====
First Round
(Thailand) B Ponsana	21	21
Q4	(Chinese Taipei) Hsueh H-y	11	12
(Japan) R Takeshita	12	13
14	(Hong Kong) Wong WK	21	21
(Thailand) S Avihingsanon	14	15
(Indonesia) E Sukamta	21	21
(Hong Kong) Chan YK	15	16
2	(Denmark) J Ø Jørgensen	21	21

Second Round
(Thailand) B Ponsana	21	21
14	(Hong Kong) Wong WK	15	11
(Indonesia) E Sukamta	11	15
2	(Denmark) J Ø Jørgensen	21	21

Third Round
(Thailand) B Ponsana	10	10
2	(Denmark) J Ø Jørgensen	21	21

== Women's singles ==
=== Seeds ===
1. (Thailand) Ratchanok Intanon (semi-final)
2. (China) Li Xuerui (final)
3. (Chinese Taipei) Tai Tzu-ying (semi-final)
4. (China) Wang Shixian (quarter-final)
5. (South Korea) Sung Ji-hyun (first round)
6. (China) Wang Yihan (champion)
7. (Japan) Akane Yamaguchi (withdrew)
8. (Japan) Nozomi Okuhara (quarter-final)

=== Finals ===
Semifinals
1	(Thailand) Ratchanok Intanon	20	18
6	(China) Wang Yihan	22	21
3	(Chinese Taipei) Tai Tzu-ying	17	14
2	(China) Li Xuerui	21	21

Final
6	(China) Wang Yihan	21	21
2	(China) Li Xuerui	10	9

=== Top half ===
==== Section 1 ====
First Round
1	(Thailand) R Intanon	21	21
PFQ	(Vietnam) Vu TT	12	11
(China) Sun Y	21	18	21
(Hong Kong) Yip PY	10	21	8
PFQ	(Singapore) Chen JY	21	11	13
Q4	(Indonesia) Fitriani	13	21	21
(Indonesia) M Kusumastuti	15	10
(South Korea) Bae Y-j	21	21

Second Round
1	(Thailand) R Intanon	21	14	21
(China) Sun Y	6	21	11
Q4	(Indonesia) Fitriani	10	13
(South Korea) Bae Y-j	21	21

Quarterfinals
1	(Thailand) R Intanon	21	21
(South Korea) Bae Y-j	12	14

==== Section 2 ====
First Round
4	(China) Wang SX	21	21
(Japan) M Mitani	8	16
(Chinese Taipei) Pai Y-p	13	14
(Japan) S Takahashi	21	21
6	(China) Wang YH	21	21
Q2	(Chinese Taipei) Lee C-h	14	3
Q1	(Thailand) P Chochuwong	21	20	21
(Japan) Y Hashimoto	16	22	17

Second Round
4	(China) Wang SX	21	10	24
(Japan) S Takahashi	18	21	22
6	(China) Wang YH	21	23
Q1	(Thailand) P Chochuwong	13	21

Quarterfinals
4	(China) Wang SX	21	10	17
6	(China) Wang YH	10	21	21

=== Bottom half ===
==== Section 3 ====
First Round
(South Korea) Kim H-m	19	21	21
Q3	(Chinese Taipei) Sung S-y	21	4	13
(Japan) S Sato	21	21
5	(South Korea) Sung J-h	19	16
(Indonesia) L Fanetri	19	19
(India) P Sindhu	21	21
(Japan) A Ohori	21	15	9
3	(Chinese Taipei) Tai T-y	12	21	21

Second Round
(South Korea) Kim H-m	17	7
(Japan) S Sato	21	21
(India) P Sindhu	15	17
3	(Chinese Taipei) Tai T-y	21	21

Quarterfinals
(Japan) S Sato	14	18
3	(Chinese Taipei) Tai T-y	21	21

==== Section 4 ====
First Round
(Hong Kong) Cheung NY	14	17
(Thailand) N Jindapon	21	21
(Chinese Taipei) Hsu Y-c	18	11
8	(Japan) N Okuhara	21	21
(Thailand) P Buranaprasertsuk	21	11	21
(Japan) K Imabeppu	13	21	17
(Thailand) B Ongbumrungpan	21	12	19
2	(China) Li XR	17	21	21

Second Round
(Thailand) N Jindapon	14	16
8	(Japan) N Okuhara	21	21
(Thailand) P Buranaprasertsuk	18	17
2	(China) Li XR	21	21

Quarterfinals
8	(Japan) N Okuhara	12	12
2	(China) Li XR	21	21

== Men's doubles ==
=== Seeds ===
1. (South Korea) Lee Yong-dae / Yoo Yeon-seong (semi-final)
2. (China) Chai Biao / Hong Wei (first round)
3. (Indonesia) Mohammad Ahsan / Hendra Setiawan (semi-final)
4. (Japan) Hiroyuki Endo / Kenichi Hayakawa (quarter-final)
5. (China) Fu Haifeng / Zhang Nan (champion)
6. (Chinese Taipei) Lee Sheng-mu / Tsai Chia-hsin (first round)
7. (South Korea) Ko Sung-hyun / Shin Baek-cheol (quarter-final)
8. (South Korea) Kim Ki-jung / Kim Sa-rang (first round)

=== Finals ===
Semifinals
1	(South Korea) Lee Yong-dae (South Korea) Yoo Yeon-seong	16	18
5	(China) Fu Haifeng (China) Zhang Nan	21	21
3	(Indonesia) Mohammad Ahsan (Indonesia) Hendra Setiawan	19	17
(Indonesia) Markus Fernaldi Gideon (Indonesia) Kevin Sanjaya Sukamuljo	21	21

Final
5	(China) Fu Haifeng (China) Zhang Nan	21	21
(Indonesia) Markus Fernaldi Gideon (Indonesia) Kevin Sanjaya Sukamuljo	13	8

=== Top half ===
==== Section 1 ====
First Round
1	(South Korea) Lee Y-d (South Korea) Yoo Y-s	21	21
(Indonesia) B Angriawan (Indonesia) R A Saputro	13	17
(Indonesia) A Adistia (Indonesia) H A Gunawan	22	19
(Chinese Taipei) Liao M-c (Chinese Taipei) Tseng M-h	24	21
8	(South Korea) Kim K-j (South Korea) Kim S-r	14	14
(Malaysia) Goh VS (Malaysia) Tan WK	21	21
(Thailand) B Issara (Thailand) N Puangpuapech	16	16
(Indonesia) A Pratama (Indonesia) R K Suwardi	21	21

Second Round
1	(South Korea) Lee Y-d (South Korea) Yoo Y-s	16	21	21
(Chinese Taipei) Liao M-c (Chinese Taipei) Tseng M-h	21	12	6
(Malaysia) Goh VS (Malaysia) Tan WK	12	21	15
(Indonesia) A Pratama (Indonesia) R K Suwardi	21	13	21

Quarterfinals
1	(South Korea) Lee Y-d (South Korea) Yoo Y-s	21	24	21
(Indonesia) A Pratama (Indonesia) R K Suwardi	16	26	14

==== Section 2 ====
First Round
4	(Japan) H Endo (Japan) K Hayakawa	21	21
Q2	(Chinese Taipei) Liu W-c (Chinese Taipei) Yang P-h	15	10
(Chinese Taipei) Lu C-y (Chinese Taipei) Tien T-c	19	14
Q3	(Hong Kong) Fe Kurniawan (Hong Kong) Yeung SC	21	21
5	(China) Fu HF (China) Zhang N	21	21
PFQ	(South Korea) Choi S-k (South Korea) Kim J-h	9	14
Q1	(Malaysia) Mak HC (Malaysia) Teo KS	24	21
(Chinese Taipei) Chen H-l (Chinese Taipei) Wang C-l	22	15

Second Round
4	(Japan) H Endo (Japan) K Hayakawa	21	21
Q3	(Hong Kong) Fe Kurniawan (Hong Kong) Yeung SC	17	8
5	(China) Fu HF (China) Zhang N	21	21
Q1	(Malaysia) Mak HC (Malaysia) Teo KS	12	8

Quarterfinals
4	(Japan) H Endo (Japan) K Hayakawa	24	14
5	(China) Fu HF (China) Zhang N	26	21

=== Bottom half ===
==== Section 3 ====
First Round
(Malaysia) Koo KK (Malaysia) Tan BH	18	24
(Japan) T Kamura (Japan) K Sonoda	21	26
(Japan) K Kazuno (Japan) K Yamada	19	13
7	(South Korea) Ko S-h (South Korea) Shin B-c	21	21
(Japan) H Hashimoto (Japan) N Hirata	21	21
(Indonesia) I Fadhilah (Indonesia) M Kido	18	10
(Chinese Taipei) Lin C-y (Chinese Taipei) Wu H-l	18	17
3	(Indonesia) M Ahsan (Indonesia) H Setiwan	21	21

Second Round
(Japan) T Kamura (Japan) K Sonoda	19	15
7	(South Korea) Ko S-h (South Korea) Shin B-c	21	21
(Japan) H Hashimoto (Japan) N Hirata	16	14
3	(Indonesia) M Ahsan (Indonesia) H Setiwan	21	21

Quarterfinals
7	(South Korea) Ko S-h (South Korea) Shin B-c	15	23	19
3	(Indonesia) M Ahsan (Indonesia) H Setiwan	21	21	21

==== Section 4 ====
First Round
(France) B Careme (France) R Labar	24	14	21
PFQ	(Netherlands) R Bosch (New Zealand) O Leydon-Davis	22	21	23
(Indonesia) M F Gideon (Indonesia) K S Sukamuljo	17	21	21
6	(Chinese Taipei) Lee S-m (Chinese Taipei) Tsai C-h	21	16	17
(Indonesia) W Nayaka (Indonesia) A Yusuf	22	14	22
Q4	(Malaysia) Chooi KM (Malaysia) Ow YH	20	21	20
(Japan) T Inoue (Japan) Y Kaneko	21	18	21
2	(China) Chai B (China) Hong W	17	21	13

Second Round
PFQ	(Netherlands) R Bosch (New Zealand) O Leydon-Davis	10	13^{r}
(Indonesia) M F Gideon (Indonesia) K S Sukamuljo	21	17
(Indonesia) W Nayaka (Indonesia) A Yusuf	11	13
(Japan) T Inoue (Japan) Y Kaneko	21	21

Quarterfinals
(Indonesia) M F Gideon (Indonesia) K S Sukamuljo	21	21
(Japan) T Inoue (Japan) Y Kaneko	19	18

== Women's doubles ==
=== Seeds ===
1. (Japan) Misaki Matsutomo / Ayaka Takahashi (semi-final)
2. (China) Luo Ying / Luo Yu (final)
3. (Denmark) Christinna Pedersen / Kamilla Rytter Juhl (second round)
4. (Indonesia) Nitya Krishinda Maheswari / Greysia Polii (champion)
5. (Japan) Reika Kakiiwa / Miyuki Maeda (withdrew)
6. (South Korea) Chang Ye-na / Jung Kyung-eun (quarter-final)
7. (South Korea) Lee So-hee / Shin Seung-chan (first round)
8. (Malaysia) Vivian Hoo Kah Mun / Woon Khe Wei (second round)

=== Finals ===
Semifinals
1	(Japan) Misaki Matsutomo (Japan) Ayaka Takahashi	12	16
4	(Indonesia) Nitya Krishinda Maheswari (Indonesia) Greysia Polii	21	21
Q3	(China) Huang Yaqiong (China) Ma Jin	17	16
2	(China) Luo Ying (China) Luo Yu	21	21

Final
4	(Indonesia) Nitya Krishinda Maheswari (Indonesia) Greysia Polii	21	21
2	(China) Luo Ying (China) Luo Yu	17	17

=== Top half ===
==== Section 1 ====
First Round
1	(Japan) M Matsutomo (Japan) A Takahashi	21	21
PFQ	(Japan) S Tanaka (Japan) K Yonemoto	14	13
(Japan) Y Fukushima (Japan) S Hirota	21	21	22
(Vietnam) Nguyen TS (Vietnam) Vu TT	23	17	20
8	(Malaysia) V Hoo (Malaysia) Woon KW	21	21	21
(South Korea) Chae Y-j (South Korea) Kim H-r	6	23	13
(South Korea) Go A-r (South Korea) Yoo H-w	21	22
(Indonesia) D D Haris (Indonesia) R A Pradipta	12	20

Second Round
1	(Japan) M Matsutomo (Japan) A Takahashi	21	21
(Japan) Y Fukushima (Japan) S Hirota	9	12
8	(Malaysia) V Hoo (Malaysia) Woon KW	16	16
(South Korea) Go A-r (South Korea) Yoo H-w	21	21

Quarterfinals
1	(Japan) M Matsutomo (Japan) A Takahashi	21	30
(South Korea) Go A-r (South Korea) Yoo H-w	19	29

==== Section 2 ====
First Round
4	(Indonesia) Nitya Krishinda Maheswari (Indonesia) Greysia Polii	21	21
(Japan) Ayane Kurihara (Japan) Naru Shinoya	10	17
(Chinese Taipei) Hsu Ya-ching (Chinese Taipei) Pai Yu-po	8	11
(Japan) Naoko Fukuman (Japan) Kurumi Yonao	21	21
7	(South Korea) Lee So-hee (South Korea) Shin Seung-chan	16	20
(Japan) Shizuka Matsuo (Japan) Mami Naito	21	22
(Chinese Taipei) Hsieh Pei-chen (Chinese Taipei) Wu Ti-jung	19	17
(Thailand) Chayanit Chaladchalam (Thailand) Phataimas Muenwong	21	21

Second Round
4	(Indonesia) Nitya Krishinda Maheswari (Indonesia) Greysia Polii	17	21	21
(Japan) Naoko Fukuman (Japan) Kurumi Yonao	21	16	16
(Japan) Shizuka Matsuo (Japan) Mami Naito	16	22	21
(Thailand) Chayanit Chaladchalam (Thailand) Phataimas Muenwong	21	20	12

Quarterfinals
4	(Indonesia) Nitya Krishinda Maheswari (Indonesia) Greysia Polii	21	21
(Japan) Shizuka Matsuo (Japan) Mami Naito	10	3

=== Bottom half ===
==== Section 3 ====
First Round
Q2	(Hong Kong) Chan Tsz Ka (Hong Kong) Yuen Sin Ying	14	18
(Indonesia) P Z Bernadeth (Indonesia) Variella Aprilsasi	21	21
Q1	(Thailand) Savitree Amitrapai (Thailand) Pacharapun Chochuwong
PFQ	(Russia) Olga Golovanova (Russia) Viktoriia Vorobeva	W	/	O
Q3	(China) Huang Yaqiong (China) Ma Jin	21	21
(Thailand) Jongkonphan Kittiharakul (Thailand) Rawinda Prajongjai	9	18
(Bulgaria) Gabriela Stoeva (Bulgaria) Stefani Stoeva	10	19
3	(Denmark) Christinna Pedersen (Denmark) Kamilla Rytter Juhl	21	21

Second Round
(Indonesia) P Z Bernadeth (Indonesia) Variella Aprilsasi	22	21
Q1	(Thailand) Savitree Amitrapai (Thailand) Pacharapun Chochuwong	20	15
Q3	(China) Huang Yaqiong (China) Ma Jin	21	19	21
3	(Denmark) Christinna Pedersen (Denmark) Kamilla Rytter Juhl	13	21	15

Quarterfinals
(Indonesia) P Z Bernadeth (Indonesia) Variella Aprilsasi	11	6
Q3	(China) Huang Yaqiong (China) Ma Jin	21	21

==== Section 4 ====
First Round
(Chinese Taipei) Cheng Chi-ya (Chinese Taipei) Lee Chia-hsin	21	21
PFQ	(Chinese Taipei) Chiang Kai-hsin (Chinese Taipei) Wu Fang-chien	18	14
(Singapore) Vanessa Neo Yu Yan (Singapore) Shinta Mulia Sari	12	14
6	(South Korea) Chang Ye-na (South Korea) Jung Kyung-eun	21	21
Q4	(Hong Kong) Poon Lok Yan (Hong Kong) Tse Ying Suet	21	21
(Japan) Mayu Matsumoto (Japan) Wakana Nagahara	17	14
(Indonesia) Keshya Nurvita Hanadia (Indonesia) Devi Tika Permatasari	7	7
2	(China) Luo Ying (China) Luo Yu	21	21

Second Round
(Chinese Taipei) Cheng Chi-ya (Chinese Taipei) Lee Chia-hsin	16	20
6	(South Korea) Chang Ye-na (South Korea) Jung Kyung-eun	21	22
Q4	(Hong Kong) Poon Lok Yan (Hong Kong) Tse Ying Suet	21	17	11
2	(China) Luo Ying (China) Luo Yu	16	21	21

Quarterfinals
6	(South Korea) Chang Ye-na (South Korea) Jung Kyung-eun	15	18
2	(China) Luo Ying (China) Luo Yu	21	21

== Mixed doubles ==
=== Seeds ===
1. (China) Zhang Nan / Zhao Yunlei (quarter-final)
2. (China) Xu Chen / Ma Jin (second round)
3. (China) Liu Cheng / Bao Yixin (quarter-final)
4. (Denmark) Joachim Fischer Nielsen / Christinna Pedersen (first round)
5. (China) Lu Kai / Huang Yaqiong (second round)
6. (Indonesia) Riky Widianto / Richi Puspita Dili (quarter-final)
7. (South Korea) Ko Sung-hyun / Kim Ha-na (champion)
8. (Indonesia) Praveen Jordan / Debby Susanto (semifinal)

=== Finals ===
Semifinals
7	(South Korea) Ko Sung-hyun (South Korea) Kim Ha-na	22	21
8	(Indonesia) Praveen Jordan (Indonesia) Debby Susanto	20	15
Q4	(South Korea) Shin Baek-cheol (South Korea) Chae Yoo-jung	21	21
(Indonesia) Ronald Alexander (Indonesia) Melati Daeva Oktaviani	18	10

Final
7	(South Korea) Ko Sung-hyun (South Korea) Kim Ha-na	21	21
Q4	(South Korea) Shin Baek-cheol (South Korea) Chae Yoo-jung	16	18

=== Top half ===
==== Section 1 ====
First Round
1	(China) Zhang N (China) Zhao YL	21	21
PFQ	(South Korea) Choi S-k (South Korea) Eom H-w	16	14
(Malaysia) Tan CT (Malaysia) Lai SJ	12	17
Q3	(Japan) K Kazuno (Japan) A Kurihara	21	21
7	(South Korea) Ko S-h (South Korea) Kim H-n	21	21
PFQ	(Indonesia) Fr Kurniawan (Indonesia) K Dewi	7	12
(Indonesia) A Adistia (Indonesia) V Marissa	18	22	21
(Hong Kong) Chan YL (Hong Kong) Tse YS	21	20	18

Second Round
1	(China) Zhang N (China) Zhao YL	21	23
Q3	(Japan) K Kazuno (Japan) A Kurihara	12	21
7	(South Korea) Ko S-h (South Korea) Kim H-n	21	11	21
(Indonesia) A Adistia (Indonesia) V Marissa	12	21	13

Quarterfinals
1	(China) Zhang N (China) Zhao YL	21	15	15
7	(South Korea) Ko S-h (South Korea) Kim H-n	15	21	21

==== Section 2 ====
First Round
3	(China) Liu C (China) Bao YX	21	21
(France) R Labar (France) E Lefel	15	19
(Indonesia) M Kido (Indonesia) P Bernadeth	21	22
Q1	(Chinese Taipei) Lin C-y (Chinese Taipei) Wu T-j	12	20
8	(Indonesia) P Jordan (Indonesia) D Susanto	23	21	21
PFQ	(Chinese Taipei) Wang C-l (Chinese Taipei) Cheng C-y	25	12	11
Q2	(Thailand) B Issara (Thailand) S Amitrapai	21	15
(Indonesia) I Fadhilah (Indonesia) W Anggraini	16	12^{r}

Second Round
3	(China) Liu C (China) Bao YX	21	21
(Indonesia) M Kido (Indonesia) P Bernadeth	11	15
8	(Indonesia) P Jordan (Indonesia) D Susanto	21	21
Q2	(Thailand) B Issara (Thailand) S Amitrapai	16	17

Quarterfinals
3	(China) Liu C (China) Bao YX	18	21	16
8	(Indonesia) P Jordan (Indonesia) D Susanto	21	15	21

=== Bottom half ===
==== Section 3 ====
First Round
(Chinese Taipei) Liao M-c (Chinese Taipei) Chen H-h	21	20	12
(Indonesia) A E Prasetya (Indonesia) A Saufika	15	22	21
PFQ	(Japan) T Inoue (Japan) S Matsuo	16	12
6	(Indonesia) R Widianto (Indonesia) R P Dili	21	21
Q4	(South Korea) Shin B-c (South Korea) Chae Y-j	18	21	21
(Hong Kong) Tang CM (Hong Kong) Poon LY	21	15	19
(South Korea) Kim K-j (South Korea) Shin S-c	21	21
4	(Denmark) J Fischer Nielsen (Denmark) C Pedersen	14	14

Second Round
(Indonesia) A E Prasetya (Indonesia) A Saufika	12	18
6	(Indonesia) R Widianto (Indonesia) R P Dili	21	21
Q4	(South Korea) Shin B-c (South Korea) Chae Y-j	21	12	21
(South Korea) Kim K-j (South Korea) Shin S-c	17	21	18

Quarterfinals
6	(Indonesia) R Widianto (Indonesia) R P Dili	16	8
Q4	(South Korea) Shin B-c (South Korea) Chae Y-j	21	21

==== Section 4 ====
First Round
(Indonesia) R Alexander (Indonesia) M D Oktaviani	18	21	21
(France) G Mittelheisser (France) A Fontaine	21	19	18
(Indonesia) E Subaktiar (Indonesia) G E Widjaja	13	21	12
5	(China) Lu K (China) Huang YQ	21	16	21
(Singapore) D Chrisnanta (Singapore) V Neo	9	24	19
(Hong Kong) Lee CH (Hong Kong) Chau HW	21	22	21
(Malaysia) Chan PS (Malaysia) Goh LY	16	21
2	(China) Xu C (China) Ma J	21	23

Second Round
(Indonesia) R Alexander (Indonesia) M D Oktaviani	21	12	21
5	(China) Lu K (China) Huang YQ	16	21	15
(Hong Kong) Lee CH (Hong Kong) Chau HW	21	21
2	(China) Xu C (China) Ma J	17	18

Quarterfinals
(Indonesia) R Alexander (Indonesia) M D Oktaviani	21	20	21
(Hong Kong) Lee CH (Hong Kong) Chau HW	18	22	10

Preceded by 2015 Canada Open Grand Prix	BWF Grand Prix and Grand Prix Gold; 2015 BWF Season	Succeeded by 2015 Russia Open Grand Prix
