= 2010 Indonesian Masters Grand Prix Gold =

Tournament details
- Dates: 12 October 2010 – 17 October 2010
- Edition: 1st
- Total prize money: US$120,000
- Venue: GOR Bulutangkis Palaran
- Location: Samarinda, East Kalimantan, Indonesia

Champions
- Men's singles: (Indonesia) Taufik Hidayat
- Women's singles: (Thailand) Ratchanok Intanon
- Men's doubles: (Indonesia) Mohammad Ahsan (Indonesia) Bona Septano
- Women's doubles: (China) Luo Ying (China) Luo Yu
- Mixed doubles: (Indonesia) Tontowi Ahmad (Indonesia) Liliyana Natsir

The 2010 Indonesian Masters Grand Prix Gold was an international badminton tournament held in Samarinda, East Kalimantan, Indonesia from October 12–17, 2010.

== Men's singles ==
=== Seeds ===
1. (Indonesia) Taufik Hidayat (champion)
2. (China) Lin Dan (withdrew)
3. (China) Chen Long (withdrew)
4. (Indonesia) Sony Dwi Kuncoro (second round)
5. (Indonesia) Dionysius Hayom Rumbaka (final)
6. (Indonesia) Andre Kurniawan Tedjono (semifinals)
7. (China) Du Pengyu (quarterfinals)
8. (Chinese Taipei) Hsueh Hsuan-yi (second round)

=== Finals ===
Quarterfinals
1	(Indonesia) Taufik Hidayat	21	21
7	(China) Du Pengyu	15	14
(Indonesia) Ary Trisnanto	15	15
6	(Indonesia) Andre Kurniawan Tedjono	21	21
(Indonesia) Alamsyah Yunus	12	21	15
(Malaysia) Daren Liew	21	11	21
5	(Indonesia) Dionysius Hayom Rumbaka	21	14	21
(Indonesia) Tommy Sugiarto	19	21	13

Semifinals
1	(Indonesia) Taufik Hidayat	21	19	21
6	(Indonesia) Andre Kurniawan Tedjono	9	21	15
(Malaysia) Daren Liew	13	11
5	(Indonesia) Dionysius Hayom Rumbaka	21	21

Final
1	(Indonesia) Taufik Hidayat	26	21	21
5	(Indonesia) Dionysius Hayom Rumbaka	28	17	14

=== Top half ===
==== Section 1 ====
First Round
1	(Indonesia) T Hidayat
BYE
(Singapore) A P Adi	21	21
(Indonesia) T Tony	18	11
(India) R. M. V. Gurusaidutt	w	/	o
(Japan) Y I Nuari	w	/	o
(Malaysia) Wee C P	15	21	23
(Indonesia) H K Wibowo	21	15	25

Second Round
1	(Indonesia) T Hidayat	21	21
(Singapore) A P Adi	7	15
(Indonesia) H K Wibowo	w	/	o

Third Round
1	(Indonesia) T Hidayat	21	21
(Indonesia) H K Wibowo	12	13

==== Section 2 ====
First Round
7	(China) Du PY
BYE
(Indonesia) A Adityawarman	21	21
(Indonesia) T A Mahbub	13	16
(Thailand) P Poodchalat	21	21
(Indonesia) N A Saputro	14	15
(Indonesia) S A Setia Putra	21	21
(Singapore) Ng Z R	7	8

Second Round
7	(China) Du PY	21	21
(Indonesia) A Adityawarman	17	16
(Thailand) P Poodchalat	21	21
(Indonesia) S A Setia Putra	17	16

Third Round
7	(China) Du PY	21	21
(Thailand) P Poodchalat	15	12

==== Section 3 ====
First Round
3	(China) Chen L	w	/	o
BYE
(Indonesia) A Trisnanto	12	21	22
(Indonesia) R Subagja	21	11	20
(Chinese Taipei) Shih K-c	21	21
(Indonesia) A O Wibowo	13	11
(Indonesia) R C Budhiawan	22	21
(Singapore) K Ho Y C	20	17

Second Round
(Indonesia) A Trisnanto	w	/	o
(Chinese Taipei) Shih K-c	21	21
(Indonesia) R C Budhiawan	12	18

Third Round
(Indonesia) A Trisnanto	21	21
(Chinese Taipei) Shih K-c	16	14

==== Section 4 ====
First Round
6	(Indonesia) A K Tedjono
BYE
(China) Wen K	21	21
(Indonesia) Siswanto	17	11
(Indonesia) F Irvannaldy	21	9	21
(Malaysia) Chong W F	14	21	16
(Singapore) A Chew M K	17	17
(Indonesia) P Dewantoro	21	21

Second Round
6	(Indonesia) A K Tedjono	21	21
(China) Wen K	19	11
(Indonesia) F Irvannaldy	21	21
(Indonesia) P Dewantoro	18	15

Third Round
6	(Indonesia) A K Tedjono	21	16	21
(Indonesia) F Irvannaldy	9	21	8

=== Bottom half ===
==== Section 5 ====
First Round
(Chinese Taipei) Liao S-s	17	18
(Indonesia) W Y Prasetyo	21	21
(Singapore) Huang C	21	8	14
(Indonesia) B S Pamungkas	19	21	21
(Indonesia) Y Pratama	11	21	7
(Indonesia) A Yunus	21	17	21
(Indonesia) R A Megananda	9	16
8	(Chinese Taipei) Hsueh H-y	21	21

Second Round
(Indonesia) W Y Prasetyo	21	19	21
(Indonesia) B S Pamungkas	10	21	18
(Indonesia) A Yunus	23	21
8	(Chinese Taipei) Hsueh H-y	21	18

Third Round
(Indonesia) W Y Prasetyo	10	19
(Indonesia) A Yunus	21	21

==== Section 6 ====
First Round
(Malaysia) D Liew	21	21
(Indonesia) S D Kusuma	11	8
(Malaysia) Y Khrishnan
(Indonesia) Hermansyah	w	/	o
(Indonesia) I M Mustofa	12	16
(Malaysia) M Misbun	21	21
BYE
4	(Indonesia) S D Kuncoro

Second Round
(Malaysia) D Liew	21	21
(Indonesia) Hermansyah	6	13
(Malaysia) M Misbun	21	10	21
4	(Indonesia) S D Kuncoro	13	21	16

Third Round
(Malaysia) D Liew	21	21
(Malaysia) M Misbun	14	14

==== Section 7 ====
First Round
(Indonesia) A Fauzi	9	21	21
(Malaysia) Chan K B	21	12	17
(Singapore) R Gonansa	21	21
(Indonesia) M A Virmala	9	11
(Indonesia) A Pratama	21	13	21
(Indonesia) G D Alrie	17	21	11
BYE
5	(Indonesia) D H Rumbaka

Second Round
(Indonesia) A Fauzi	15	21	21
(Singapore) R Gonansa	21	17	11
(Indonesia) A Pratama	18	9
5	(Indonesia) D H Rumbaka	21	21

Third Round
(Indonesia) A Fauzi	15	7
5	(Indonesia) D H Rumbaka	21	21

==== Section 8 ====
First Round
(Malaysia) M Arif A L
(Indonesia) A H Putra	w	/	o
(Indonesia) T Sugiarto	w	/	o
(Indonesia) M. Yunus
(Indonesia) E Sukamta	21	15	21
(Indonesia) R F Satrio	18	21	17
BYE
2	(China) Lin D	w	/	d

Second Round
(Indonesia) A H Putra	7	6
(Indonesia) T Sugiarto	21	21
(Indonesia) E Sukamta	w	/	o
2	(China) Lin D

Third Round
(Indonesia) T Sugiarto	21	21
(Indonesia) E Sukamta	11	19

== Women's singles ==
=== Seeds ===
1. (Indonesia) Adriyanti Firdasari (second round)
2. (Indonesia) Maria Febe Kusumastuti (semifinals)
3. (Chinese Taipei) Tai Tzu-ying (quarterfinals)
4. (Chinese Taipei) Cheng Shao-chieh (final)
5. (Indonesia) Fransisca Ratnasari (first round)
6. (Indonesia) Lindaweni Fanetri (first round)
7. (Indonesia) Maria Kristin Yulianti (first round)
8. (Singapore) Zhang Beiwen (semifinals)

=== Finals ===
Semifinals
8	(Singapore) Zhang Beiwen	9	13
4	(Chinese Taipei) Cheng Shao-chieh	21	21
(Thailand) Ratchanok Intanon	21	16	21
2	(Indonesia) Maria Febe Kusumastuti	17	21	17

Final
4	(Chinese Taipei) Cheng Shao-chieh	12	21	16
(Thailand) Ratchanok Intanon	21	19	21

=== Top half ===
==== Section 1 ====
First Round
1	(Indonesia) A Firdasari	21	21
(Indonesia) R Suwarno	12	12
(Chinese Taipei) Chen H-h	21	21
(Indonesia) Y Asmarani	12	16
8	(Singapore) Zhang BW	21	21
(Indonesia) R A Pradipta	13	15
(Indonesia) R Pungkasari	21	21
(Austria) S Prutsch	18	19

Second Round
1	(Indonesia) A Firdasari	22	17	13
(Chinese Taipei) Chen H-h	20	21	21
8	(Singapore) Zhang BW	21	21
(Indonesia) R Pungkasari	14	18

Quarterfinals
(Chinese Taipei) Chen H-h	18	13
8	(Singapore) Zhang BW	21	21

==== Section 2 ====
First Round
4	(Chinese Taipei) Cheng S-c	19	21	21
(Indonesia) B Manuputty	21	17	19
PFQ	(Indonesia) T A Ningrum	10	11
Q2	(China) Suo D	21	21
7	(Indonesia) M K Yulianti	18	21	17
(Singapore) Chen JY	21	12	21
(Indonesia) M Nadhir	15	7
(Japan) K Imabeppu	21	21

Second Round
4	(Chinese Taipei) Cheng S-c	21	21
Q2	(China) Suo D	10	10
(Singapore) Chen JY	12	21	21
(Japan) K Imabeppu	21	19	19

Quarterfinals
4	(Chinese Taipei) Cheng S-c	21	21
(Singapore) Chen JY	9	14

=== Bottom half ===
==== Section 3 ====
First Round
Q3	(China) Yao X	21	15	21
(Indonesia) H Desi	16	21	13
(Thailand) R Intanon	21	13	21
5	(Indonesia) F Ratnasari	14	21	14
(Singapore) Thng TT	15	13
(Indonesia) M E Christina	21	21
(Indonesia) M Kurniawan	18	15
3	(Chinese Taipei) Tai T-y	21	21

Second Round
Q3	(China) Yao X	21	12	11
(Thailand) R Intanon	14	21	21
(Indonesia) M E Christina	10	16
3	(Chinese Taipei) Tai T-y	21	21

Quarterfinals
(Thailand) R Intanon	21	21
3	(Chinese Taipei) Tai T-y	18	18

==== Section 4 ====
First Round
(China) Zhou H	21	21	21
(Indonesia) A Yuswandari	19	23	16
(Singapore) Gu J	17	21	21
6	(Indonesia) L Fanetri	21	13	16
(Indonesia) S A L Qoryatin	21	21
Q4	(Indonesia) P M R Pangersa	19	17
Q1	(Indonesia) E Purwaningtyas	21	14	11
2	(Indonesia) M F Kusumastuti	19	21	21

Second Round
(China) Zhou H	21	18	21
(Singapore) Gu J	12	21	9
(Indonesia) S A L Qoryatin	16	20
2	(Indonesia) M F Kusumastuti	21	22

Quarterfinals
(China) Zhou H	17	13
2	(Indonesia) M F Kusumastuti	21	21

== Men's doubles ==
=== Seeds ===
1. (Indonesia) Yonatan Suryatama Dasuki / Rian Sukmawan (final)
2. (Indonesia) Mohammad Ahsan / Bona Septano (champion)
3. (Malaysia) Goh V Shem / Teo Kok Siang (semifinals)
4. (Chinese Taipei) Liao Min-chun / Wu Chun-wei (semifinals)
5. (Indonesia) Hendra Aprida Gunawan / Flandy Limpele (quarterfinals)
6. (Indonesia) Markis Kido / Sigit Budiarto (quarterfinals)
7. (China) Liu Xiaolong / Qiu Zihan (first round)
8. (Malaysia) Mohd Zakry Abdul Latif / Hoon Thien How (withdrew)

=== Finals ===
Semifinals
1	(Indonesia) Yonatan Suryatama Dasuki (Indonesia) Rian Sukmawan	21	14	21
3	(Malaysia) Goh V Shem (Malaysia) Teo Kok Siang	18	21	17
4	(Chinese Taipei) Liao Min-chun (Chinese Taipei) Wu Chun-wei	15	15
2	(Indonesia) Mohammad Ahsan (Indonesia) Bona Septano	21	21

Final
1	(Indonesia) Yonatan Suryatama Dasuki (Indonesia) Rian Sukmawan	16	17^{r}
2	(Indonesia) Mohammad Ahsan (Indonesia) Bona Septano	21	18

=== Top half ===
==== Section 1 ====
First Round
1	(Indonesia) Y S Dasuki (Indonesia) R Sukmawan	21	17	22
(Indonesia) R Sugiarto (Indonesia) A Y Wirawan	13	21	20
(Indonesia) R Adianto (Indonesia) A Adistia	21	21
PFQ	(Indonesia) F Kinalsal (Indonesia) E Subaktiar	18	13
7	(China) Liu XL (China) Qiu ZH	16	17
(Indonesia) M F Gideon (Indonesia) C Rusdianto	21	21
(Indonesia) A P R Putra (Indonesia) R K Suwardi	22	23
(Singapore) Liu Y (Singapore) T Yeo Z J	20	21

Second Round
1	(Indonesia) Y S Dasuki (Indonesia) R Sukmawan	21	20	21
(Indonesia) R Adianto (Indonesia) A Adistia	19	22	15
(Indonesia) M F Gideon (Indonesia) C Rusdianto	18	12
(Indonesia) A P R Putra (Indonesia) R K Suwardi	21	21

Quarterfinals
1	(Indonesia) Y S Dasuki (Indonesia) R Sukmawan	22	21
(Indonesia) A P R Putra (Indonesia) R K Suwardi	20	18

==== Section 2 ====
First Round
3	(Malaysia) Goh V S (Malaysia) Teo K S	21	21
(Indonesia) L Hadiyanto (Indonesia) C Wijaya	13	18
(Chinese Taipei) Hsueh H-y (Chinese Taipei) Liao S-s	17	21	21
(Indonesia) F Kurniawan (Indonesia) W Windarto	21	8	14
PFQ	(Singapore) Huang C (Singapore) Ng Z R	20	13
(Indonesia) B Angriawan (Indonesia) M Ulinnuha	22	21
(Indonesia) A Anhar (Indonesia) H S Nugroho	22	21
Q1	(Indonesia) L A Nugroho (Indonesia) R Susanto	20	18

Second Round
3	(Malaysia) Goh V S (Malaysia) Teo K S	23	21	21
(Indonesia) F Kurniawan (Indonesia) W Windarto	25	17	16
(Indonesia) B Angriawan (Indonesia) M Ulinnuha	20	15
(Indonesia) A Anhar (Indonesia) H S Nugroho	22	21

Quarterfinals
3	(Malaysia) Goh V S (Malaysia) Teo K S	21	21
(Indonesia) A Anhar (Indonesia) H S Nugroho	19	14

=== Bottom half ===
==== Section 3 ====
First Round
(Indonesia) R Y Kresnayandi (Indonesia) A Saputra	18	17
Q2	(Indonesia) Darmiko (Indonesia) F Rusman	21	21
(Malaysia) Pang Z L (Malaysia) Tan W T	9	6
5	(Indonesia) H A Gunawan (Indonesia) F Limpele	21	21
(Indonesia) Y U Kasah (Indonesia) J Riyadi	21	21
Q4	(Indonesia) T Tony (Indonesia) M A Virmala	14	16
(Indonesia) T Wardhana (Indonesia) R Wijaya	20	21	19
4	(Chinese Taipei) Liao M-c (Chinese Taipei) Wu C-w	22	18	21

Second Round
Q2	(Indonesia) Darmiko (Indonesia) F Rusman	17	11
5	(Indonesia) H A Gunawan (Indonesia) F Limpele	21	21
(Indonesia) Y U Kasah (Indonesia) J Riyadi	21	15	21
4	(Chinese Taipei) Liao M-c (Chinese Taipei) Wu C-w	15	21	23

Quarterfinals
5	(Indonesia) H A Gunawan (Indonesia) F Limpele	23	20	19
4	(Chinese Taipei) Liao M-c (Chinese Taipei) Wu C-w	21	22	21

==== Section 4 ====
First Round
(Malaysia) Goh J H (Malaysia) Ow Y H	21	17	21
(Indonesia) J R Jansen (Indonesia) D Prabudita	17	21	13
(Singapore) A P Adi (Singapore) R Gonansa	12	15
6	(Indonesia) M Kido (Indonesia) S Budiarto	21	21
(Malaysia) L Abdul Khalid (Malaysia) V Mawan	20	18
(Indonesia) A Pratama (Indonesia) R A Saputro	22	21
Q3	(Indonesia) C Adiwijaya (Indonesia) S S Radhitian	13	11
2	(Indonesia) M Ahsan (Indonesia) B Septano	21	21

Second Round
(Malaysia) Goh J H (Malaysia) Ow Y H	12	17
6	(Indonesia) M Kido (Indonesia) S Budiarto	21	21
(Indonesia) A Pratama (Indonesia) R A Saputro	20	19
2	(Indonesia) M Ahsan (Indonesia) B Septano	22	21

Quarterfinals
6	(Indonesia) M Kido (Indonesia) S Budiarto	14	16
2	(Indonesia) M Ahsan (Indonesia) B Septano	21	21

== Women's doubles ==
=== Seeds ===
1. (Indonesia) Meiliana Jauhari / Greysia Polii (final)
2. (Indonesia) Anneke Feinya Agustin / Annisa Wahyuni (semifinals)
3. (Indonesia) Komala Dewi / Keshya Nurvita Hanadia (quarterfinals)
4. (Indonesia) Suci Rizky Andini / Della Destiara Haris (quarterfinals)

=== Finals ===
Semifinals
1	(Indonesia) Meiliana Jauhari (Indonesia) Greysia Polii	21	17	21
(Indonesia) Vita Marissa (Indonesia) Nadya Melati	19	21	15
(China) Luo Ying (China) Luo Yu	21	21
2	(Indonesia) Anneke Feinya Agustin (Indonesia) Annisa Wahyuni	15	18

Final
1	(Indonesia) Meiliana Jauhari (Indonesia) Greysia Polii	21	18	11
(China) Luo Ying (China) Luo Yu	11	21	21

=== Top half ===
==== Section 1 ====
First Round
1	(Indonesia) M Jauhari (Indonesia) G Polii
BYE
(Indonesia) L Nurlita (Indonesia) M Santoso	22	19	16
(Indonesia) D Agustiawati (Indonesia) A Rahmasari	20	21	21
(Indonesia) R Amelia (Indonesia) M D Oktavianti
BYE
(China) Bao YX (China) Lu L	17	13
(Indonesia) G R Imawan (Indonesia) T Nuraidah	21	21

Second Round
1	(Indonesia) M Jauhari (Indonesia) G Polii	21	21
(Indonesia) D Agustiawati (Indonesia) A Rahmasari	9	9
(Indonesia) R Amelia (Indonesia) M D Oktavianti	20	14
(Indonesia) G R Imawan (Indonesia) T Nuraidah	22	21

Quarterfinals
1	(Indonesia) M Jauhari (Indonesia) G Polii	21	21
(Indonesia) G R Imawan (Indonesia) T Nuraidah	12	12

==== Section 2 ====
First Round
4	(Indonesia) S R Andini (Indonesia) D D Haris
BYE
(Malaysia) Lai P J (Malaysia) M Ng P L	21	21
(Indonesia) A P Darajat (Indonesia) D P Medita	12	10
(Indonesia) V Marissa (Indonesia) N Melati
BYE
(Indonesia) E O Adriyana (Indonesia) N M Wijaya	14	12
(Singapore) Chen JY (Singapore) Gu J	21	21

Second Round
4	(Indonesia) S R Andini (Indonesia) D D Haris	21	22	21
(Malaysia) Lai P J (Malaysia) M Ng P L	15	24	14
(Indonesia) V Marissa (Indonesia) N Melati	21	18	21
(Singapore) Chen JY (Singapore) Gu J	19	21	16

Quarterfinals
4	(Indonesia) S R Andini (Indonesia) D D Haris	22	14	10
(Indonesia) V Marissa (Indonesia) N Melati	20	21	21

=== Bottom half ===
==== Section 3 ====
First Round
(Indonesia) J Gozali (Indonesia) A Variella	19	21	15
(China) Luo Y (China) Luo Y	21	14	21
(Singapore) Thng T T (Singapore) Zhang BW	21	12	19
(Indonesia) A Ratnasari (Indonesia) M Rosita	18	21	21
(Chinese Taipei) Hung S-c (Chinese Taipei) Yang C-c	8	18
(Indonesia) N Kwanrico (Indonesia) G E Widjaja	21	21
BYE
3	(Indonesia) K Dewi (Indonesia) K N Hanadia

Second Round
(China) Luo Y (China) Luo Y	21	21
(Indonesia) A Ratnasari (Indonesia) M Rosita	7	8
(Indonesia) N Kwanrico (Indonesia) G E Widjaja	13	18
3	(Indonesia) K Dewi (Indonesia) K N Hanadia	21	21

Quarterfinals
(China) Luo Y (China) Luo Y	21	15	21
3	(Indonesia) K Dewi (Indonesia) K N Hanadia	13	21	18

==== Section 4 ====
First Round
(Indonesia) Y Rahayu (Indonesia) D Yuliana	8	7
(Malaysia) V Hoo K M (Malaysia) Lim Y L	21	21
BYE
(Indonesia) J Muljati (Indonesia) Y Y Susanto	w	d	n
(Indonesia) S P Irawati (Indonesia) N K Maheswari	21	21
(Indonesia) M Timur (Philippines) Wang IL	14	15
BYE
2	(Indonesia) A F Agustin (Indonesia) A Wahyuni

Second Round
(Malaysia) V Hoo K M (Malaysia) Lim Y L	w	/	o
(Indonesia) S P Irawati (Indonesia) N K Maheswari	19	17
2	(Indonesia) A F Agustin (Indonesia) A Wahyuni	21	21

Quarterfinals
(Malaysia) V Hoo K M (Malaysia) Lim Y L	7	16
2	(Indonesia) A F Agustin (Indonesia) A Wahyuni	21	21

== Mixed doubles ==
=== Seeds ===
1. (Indonesia) Hendra Aprida Gunawan / Vita Marissa (quarterfinals)
2. (Indonesia) Fran Kurniawan / Pia Zebadiah Bernadeth (semifinals)
3. (Indonesia) Muhammad Rijal / Debby Susanto (quarterfinals)
4. (Malaysia) Ong Jian Guo / Chong Sook Chin (quarterfinals)
5. (Indonesia) Nova Widianto / Shendy Puspa Irawati (withdrew)
6. (Indonesia) Tontowi Ahmad / Liliyana Natsir (champion)
7. (Indonesia) Markis Kido / Lita Nurlita (final)
8. (China) Qiu Zihan / Luo Yu (first round)

=== Finals ===
Semifinals
7	(Indonesia) Markis Kido (Indonesia) Lita Nurlita	21	21
(Indonesia) Mochamad Rizki Delynugraha (Indonesia) Richi Puspita Dili	10	14
6	(Indonesia) Tontowi Ahmad (Indonesia) Liliyana Natsir	21	25
2	(Indonesia) Fran Kurniawan (Indonesia) Pia Zebadiah Bernadeth	11	23

Final
7	(Indonesia) Markis Kido (Indonesia) Lita Nurlita	11	13
6	(Indonesia) Tontowi Ahmad (Indonesia) Liliyana Natsir	21	21

=== Top half ===
==== Section 1 ====
First Round
1	(Indonesia) H A Gunawan (Indonesia) V Marissa	21	21
(Indonesia) I Fadhilah (Indonesia) W Anggraini	15	12
(Malaysia) Goh V S (Malaysia) Lim Y L	21	21
(Indonesia) D Prabudita (Indonesia) D P Medita	14	8
7	(Indonesia) M Kido (Indonesia) L Nurlita	19	21	21
(Malaysia) L Abdul Khalid (Malaysia) Hoo K M	21	11	16
(Chinese Taipei) Liao M-c (Chinese Taipei) Chen H-h	21	21
(Indonesia) E Subaktiar (Indonesia) R Amelia	19	11

Second Round
1	(Indonesia) H A Gunawan (Indonesia) V Marissa	21	21
(Malaysia) Goh V S (Malaysia) Lim Y L	16	14
7	(Indonesia) M Kido (Indonesia) L Nurlita	21	21
(Chinese Taipei) Liao M-c (Chinese Taipei) Chen H-h	17	14

Quarterfinals
1	(Indonesia) H A Gunawan (Indonesia) V Marissa	17	14
7	(Indonesia) M Kido (Indonesia) L Nurlita	21	21

==== Section 2 ====
First Round
3	(Indonesia) M Rijal (Indonesia) D Susanto	21	21
(Chinese Taipei) Shih K-c (Chinese Taipei) Hung S-c	13	11
Q1	(Indonesia) R Susanto (Indonesia) G E Widjaja	18	10
(Indonesia) R Wijaya (Indonesia) M E Christina	21	21
8	(China) Qiu ZH (China) Luo Y	17	21	12
(Indonesia) T Wardhana (Indonesia) N Melati	21	15	21
(Malaysia) V I Mawan (Malaysia) M Ng P L	8	19
(Indonesia) M R Delynugraha (Indonesia) R P Dili	21	21

Second Round
3	(Indonesia) M Rijal (Indonesia) D Susanto	21	21
(Indonesia) R Wijaya (Indonesia) M E Christina	18	17
(Indonesia) T Wardhana (Indonesia) N Melati	21	12	19
(Indonesia) M R Delynugraha (Indonesia) R P Dili	14	21	21

Quarterfinals
3	(Indonesia) M Rijal (Indonesia) D Susanto	21	16	20
(Indonesia) M R Delynugraha (Indonesia) R P Dili	11	21	22

=== Bottom half ===
==== Section 3 ====
First Round
Q3	(Indonesia) F Kinalsal (Indonesia) M D Oktavianti	9	16
(Indonesia) J R Jansen (Indonesia) N Kwanrico	21	21
(Chinese Taipei) Wu C-w (Chinese Taipei) Yang C-c	15	12
6	(Indonesia) T Ahmad (Indonesia) L Natsir	21	21
(China) Liu XL (China) Bao YX	21	21
(Indonesia) R Arief (Indonesia) A Ratnasari	12	9
(Indonesia) R Widianto (Indonesia) T R Nuraidah	22	18	19
4	(Malaysia) Ong J G (Malaysia) Chong S C	20	21	21

Second Round
(Indonesia) J R Jansen (Indonesia) N Kwanrico	14	7
6	(Indonesia) T Ahmad (Indonesia) L Natsir	21	21
(China) Liu XL (China) Bao YX	14	21	12
4	(Malaysia) Ong J G (Malaysia) Chong S C	21	13	21

Quarterfinals
6	(Indonesia) T Ahmad (Indonesia) L Natsir	21	22
4	(Malaysia) Ong J G (Malaysia) Chong S C	18	20

==== Section 4 ====
First Round
Q4	(Indonesia) T Kusharjanto (Indonesia) M Timur	21	21
(Indonesia) F F Rusman (Indonesia) D Yuliana	12	17
(Malaysia) Ow Y H (Malaysia) Lai P J	21	19	21
PFQ	(Indonesia) L A Nugroho (Indonesia) A P Darajat	9	21	12
(Indonesia) H Sahab (Indonesia) M Rosita	15	21	11
Q2	(Indonesia) Darmiko (Indonesia) Y Rahayu	21	15	21
(Indonesia) H Mulyono (Indonesia) A Rahmasari	14	8
2	(Indonesia) F Kurniawan (Indonesia) P Z Bernadeth	21	21

Second Round
Q4	(Indonesia) T Kusharjanto (Indonesia) M Timur	23	21
(Malaysia) Ow Y H (Malaysia) Lai P J	21	5
Q2	(Indonesia) Darmiko (Indonesia) Y Rahayu	13	9
2	(Indonesia) F Kurniawan (Indonesia) P Z Bernadeth	21	21

Quarterfinals
Q4	(Indonesia) T Kusharjanto (Indonesia) M Timur
2	(Indonesia) F Kurniawan (Indonesia) P Z Bernadeth	w	/	o
