= 2009 BWF World Junior Championships – Boys' doubles =

2009 BWF World Junior Championships Boys' doubles
Tournament details
- Dates: 28 October 2009 – 1 November 2009
- Edition: 20th
- Level: International
- Venue: Sultan Abdul Halim Stadium
- Location: Alor Setar, Malaysia

The boys' doubles of the tournament 2009 BWF World Junior Championships was held on 28 October–1 November 2009. The Malaysian pair of Chooi Kah Ming and Ow Yao Han took out the boys' doubles final defeating Indonesian pair, Berry Angriawan and Muhammad Ulinnuha in three sets.

== Seeds ==
1. (Indonesia) Angga Pratama / Yohanes Rendy Sugiarto (semi-final)
2. (China) Liu Peixuan / Lu Kai (quarter-final)
3. (Malaysia) Chooi Kah Ming / Ow Yao Han (champion)
4. (Thailand) Tin Caballes / Nipitphon Puangpuapech (semi-final)
5. (Denmark) Emil Holst / Niclas Nohr (quarter-final)
6. (Indonesia) Berry Angriawan / Muhammad Ulinnuha (final)
7. (India) Sai Praneeth / Pranav Chopra (third round)
8. (Japan) Shohei Hoshino / Akira Kobayashi (quarter-final)

== Draw ==
=== Finals ===
Semifinals
1	(Indonesia) Angga Pratama (Indonesia) Yohanes Rendy Sugiarto	21	15	18
3/4	(Malaysia) Chooi Kah Ming (Malaysia) Ow Yao Han	13	21	21
3/4	(Thailand) Tin Caballes (Thailand) Nipitphon Puangpuapech	19	15
5/8	(Indonesia) Berry Angriawan (Indonesia) Muhammad Ulinnuha	21	21

Final
3/4	(Malaysia) Chooi Kah Ming (Malaysia) Ow Yao Han	19	21	23
5/8	(Indonesia) Berry Angriawan (Indonesia) Muhammad Ulinnuha	21	12	21

=== Top-half ===
==== Section 1 ====
First round
(Hong Kong) Chan DL (Hong Kong) Tam CH	10	13
(Netherlands) J Arends (Netherlands) J Maas	21	21
(Finland) K Lehikoinen (Norway) M Fartum
(Cambodia) L Khlaychchit (Cambodia) L Shopheaktra	wo
(Denmark) R Fladberg (Denmark) K Astrup	21	21
(Turkey) R Ozturk (Turkey) E Vural	13	12
(Singapore) Ngo YC (Singapore) G Ong	21	21
(Switzerland) N Blondel (Canada) C Liu	13	18
(England) M Middleton (England) T Penty	21	21
(Vietnam) Bui QT (Vietnam) Le V	16	18

Second round
1	(Indonesia) A Pratama (Indonesia) Y Sugiarto	21	26
(China) Guo JJ (China) Li G	13	24
(Netherlands) J Arends (Netherlands) J Maas	21	21
(Finland) K Lehikoinen (Norway) M Fartum	16	15
5/8	(Japan) S Hoshino (Japan) A Kobayashi	21	22
(Denmark) R Fladberg (Denmark) K Astrup	19	20
(Singapore) Ngo YC (Singapore) G Ong	19	18
(England) M Middleton (England) T Penty	21	21

Third round
1	(Indonesia) A Pratama (Indonesia) Y Sugiarto	21	19	21
(Netherlands) J Arends (Netherlands) J Maas	7	21	14
5/8	(Japan) S Hoshino (Japan) A Kobayashi	21	21
(England) M Middleton (England) T Penty	13	15

Quarter Final
1	(Indonesia) A Pratama (Indonesia) Y Sugiarto	21	21
5/8	(Japan) S Hoshino (Japan) A Kobayashi	15	14

==== Section 2 ====
First round
(Sri Lanka) N Hettiarachchi (Sri Lanka) D Kariyawasam	19	18
(France) F Gauthier (France) T Rouxel	21	21
(Sweden) S Bergstrom (Sweden) P Lundvist	21	22
(Switzerland) I Jenny (Switzerland) J Kleiner	12	20
(Thailand) W Buranakruea (Thailand) P Supasri	21	21
(Nepal) B Gurung (Nepal) S Tamrakar	6	14
(Australia) A Gobinathan (Australia) E Hung	14	9
(Chinese Taipei) Chang K-L (Chinese Taipei) Lin Y-T	21	21
(Canada) A Chee (Canada) J Donaldson	21	13	14
(New Zealand) L Charlesworth (New Zealand) B Matheson	14	21	21

Second round
3/4	(Malaysia) Chooi KM (Malaysia) Ow YH	21	21
(Macau) Lam CL (Macau) Lei MF	6	11
(France) F Gauthier (France) T Rouxel	21	23
(Sweden) S Bergstrom (Sweden) P Lundvist	23	25
5/8	(India) S Praneeth (India) P Chopra	21	21
(Thailand) W Buranakruea (Thailand) P Supasri	16	14
(Chinese Taipei) Chang K-L (Chinese Taipei) Lin Y-T	21	21
(New Zealand) L Charlesworth (New Zealand) B Matheson	16	11

Third round
3/4	(Malaysia) Chooi KM (Malaysia) Ow YH	21	21
(Sweden) S Bergstrom (Sweden) P Lundvist	17	12
5/8	(India) S Praneeth (India) P Chopra	14	15
(Chinese Taipei) Chang K-L (Chinese Taipei) Lin Y-T	21	21

Quarter Final
3/4	(Malaysia) Chooi KM (Malaysia) Ow YH	21	22
(Chinese Taipei) Chang K-L (Chinese Taipei) Lin Y-T	17	20

=== Bottom half ===
==== Section 3 ====
First round
(Cambodia) C Senvisoth (Cambodia) S Kimhong	wo
(Nepal) B Shrestha (Nepal) R Tammang
(Pakistan) T Arab (Pakistan) M Bhatti	12	15
(England) C Coles (England) M Nottingham	21	21
(Vietnam) Le HA (Vietnam) Tran DP	21	21
(Australia) B Chu (Australia) N David	9	15
(Japan) K Momota (Japan) N Otaki	21	21
(Sri Lanka) O Fernando (Sri Lanka) H Perera	13	10
(Malaysia) Goh JH (Malaysia) Pang ZL	21	21
(New Zealand) D Oud (New Zealand) P Talayan	15	15
(Hong Kong) Lee CH (Hong Kong) Ng KL	21	19	21
(Chinese Taipei) Hung Y-Y (Chinese Taipei) Pan C-H	17	21	12

Second round
(Nepal) B Shrestha (Nepal) R Tammang	5	7
(England) C Coles (England) M Nottingham	21	21
(Vietnam) Le HA (Vietnam) Tran DP	16	9
5/8	(Denmark) E Holst (Denmark) N Nohr	21	21
(Japan) K Momota (Japan) N Otaki	15	15
(Malaysia) Goh JH (Malaysia) Pang ZL	21	21
(Hong Kong) Lee CH (Hong Kong) Ng KL	23	16
3/4	(Thailand) T Caballes (Thailand) N Puangpuapech	25	21

Third round
(England) C Coles (England) M Nottingham	wo
5/8	(Denmark) E Holst (Denmark) N Nohr
(Malaysia) Goh JH (Malaysia) Pang ZL	20	21	18
3/4	(Thailand) T Caballes (Thailand) N Puangpuapech	22	13	21

Quarter Final
5/8	(Denmark) E Holst (Denmark) N Nohr	18	12
3/4	(Thailand) T Caballes (Thailand) N Puangpuapech	21	21

==== Section 4 ====
First round
(Turkey) E Aslan (Turkey) H Oruc	21	17	21
(Germany) P Kaemnitz (Austria) V Vattanirappel	17	21	13
(Germany) A Heinz (Germany) M Schwenger	21	21	21
(India) P Kumar (India) S Reddy	23	11	13
(Canada) T Lam (Canada) N Lee	8	15
(Singapore) Tan KH (Singapore) J Wong	21	21
(Macau) Cheang WL (Macau) A de Assis	19	9
(Mexico) A Lopez (Mexico) L Munoz	21	21
(Philippines) P Magnaye (Philippines) P Vivas	21	21
(Russia) K Abramov (Russia) D Balandin	13	11

Second round
(Turkey) E Aslan (Turkey) H Oruc	21	16	21
(Germany) A Heinz (Germany) M Schwenger	15	21	13
(Singapore) Tan KH (Singapore) J Wong	9	12
5/8	(Indonesia) B Angriawan (Indonesia) M Ulinnuha	21	21
(Mexico) A Lopez (Mexico) L Munoz	13	15
(Philippines) P Magnaye (Philippines) P Vivas	21	21
(France) M Baumann (France) L Claerbout	14	15
2	(China) Liu PX (China) Lu K	21	21

Third round
(Turkey) E Aslan (Turkey) H Oruc	15	13
5/8	(Indonesia) B Angriawan (Indonesia) M Ulinnuha	21	21
(Philippines) P Magnaye (Philippines) P Vivas	16	14
2	(China) Liu PX (China) Lu K	21	21

Quarter Final
5/8	(Indonesia) B Angriawan (Indonesia) M Ulinnuha	21	15	21
2	(China) Liu PX (China) Lu K	17	21	13
