= Angga Pratama =

Indonesian badminton player (born 1991)

Personal information
- Born: 12 May 1991 (age 35) Jakarta, Indonesia
- Height: 1.80 m (5 ft 11 in)
- Weight: 80 kg (176 lb)

Sport
- Country: Indonesia
- Sport: Badminton
- Handedness: Right
- Coached by: Aryono Miranat; Herry Iman Pierngadi

Men's doubles
- Highest ranking: 7 (with Rian Agung Saputro 13 March 2014); 7 (with Ricky Karanda Suwardi 22 December 2016)
- BWF profile
Medal record
Men's badminton
Representing Indonesia
Sudirman Cup
Bronze medal – third place	2015 Dongguan	Mixed team
Thomas Cup
Silver medal – second place	2016 Kunshan	Men's team
Bronze medal – third place	2014 New Delhi	Men's team
Asia Team Championships
Gold medal – first place	2016 Hyderabad	Men's team
Gold medal – first place	2018 Alor Setar	Men's team
SEA Games
Gold medal – first place	2013 Naypyidaw	Men's doubles
Gold medal – first place	2015 Singapore	Men's doubles
Gold medal – first place	2015 Singapore	Men's team
Summer Universiade
Gold medal – first place	2011 Shenzhen	Mixed team
World Junior Championships
Silver medal – second place	2009 Alor Setar	Mixed doubles
Bronze medal – third place	2009 Alor Setar	Boys' doubles
Asian Junior Championships
Gold medal – first place	2009 Kuala Lumpur	Boys' doubles

Angga Pratama (born 12 May 1991) is an Indonesian badminton player affiliated with Jaya Raya Jakarta club. He competed in the men's doubles event in the international tournaments, and together with Ricky Karanda Suwardi, he won the 2015 Singapore Open, became his one and only BWF World Superseries title after beating Chinese pair Fu Haifeng and Zhang Nan by 21–15, 11–21, 21–14.

== Achievements ==
=== SEA Games ===
Men's doubles
Year	Venue	Partner	Opponent	Score	Result
2013	Wunna Theikdi Indoor Stadium; Naypyidaw, Myanmar	(Indonesia) Rian Agung Saputro	(Indonesia) Berry Angriawan (Indonesia) Ricky Karanda Suwardi	21–13, 17–21, 21–11	Gold
2015	Singapore Indoor Stadium; Singapore	(Indonesia) Ricky Karanda Suwardi	(Indonesia) Marcus Fernaldi Gideon (Indonesia) Kevin Sanjaya Sukamuljo	21–12, 24–22	Gold

=== BWF World Junior Championships ===
Boys' doubles
Year	Venue	Partner	Opponent	Score	Result
2009	Sultan Abdul Halim Stadium; Alor Setar, Malaysia	(Indonesia) Yohanes Rendy Sugiarto	(Malaysia) Chooi Kah Ming (Malaysia) Ow Yao Han	21–13, 15–21, 18–21	Bronze

Mixed doubles
Year	Venue	Partner	Opponent	Score	Result
2009	Sultan Abdul Halim Stadium; Alor Setar, Malaysia	(Indonesia) Della Destiara Haris	(Thailand) Maneepong Jongjit (Thailand) Rodjana Chuthabunditkul	19–21, 21–14, 17–21	Silver

=== Asian Junior Championships ===
Boys' doubles
Year	Venue	Partner	Opponent	Score	Result
2009	Stadium Juara; Kuala Lumpur, Malaysia	(Indonesia) Yohanes Rendy Sugiarto	(Malaysia) Ow Yao Han (Malaysia) Yew Hong Kheng	21–15, 21–16	Gold

=== BWF World Tour (1 runner-up) ===
The BWF World Tour, which was announced on 19 March 2017 and implemented in 2018, is a series of elite badminton tournaments sanctioned by the Badminton World Federation (BWF). The BWF World Tour is divided into levels of World Tour Finals, Super 1000, Super 750, Super 500, Super 300, and the BWF Tour Super 100.

Men's doubles
Year	Tournament	Level	Partner	Opponent	Score	Result
2019	India Open	Super 500	(Indonesia) Ricky Karanda Suwardi	(Chinese Taipei) Lee Yang (Chinese Taipei) Wang Chi-lin	14–21, 14–21	(silver) Runner-up

=== BWF Superseries (1 title, 4 runners-up) ===
The BWF Superseries, which was launched on 14 December 2006 and implemented in 2007, was a series of elite badminton tournaments, sanctioned by the Badminton World Federation (BWF). BWF Superseries levels were Superseries and Superseries Premier. A season of Superseries consisted of twelve tournaments around the world that had been introduced since 2011. Successful players were invited to the Superseries Finals, which were held at the end of each year.

Men's doubles
Year	Tournament	Partner	Opponent	Score	Result
2011	India Open	(Indonesia) Rian Agung Saputro	(Japan) Hirokatsu Hashimoto (Japan) Noriyasu Hirata	17–21, 9–21	(silver) Runner-up
2015	Singapore Open	(Indonesia) Ricky Karanda Suwardi	(China) Fu Haifeng (China) Zhang Nan	21–15, 11–21, 21–14	(gold) Winner
2016	India Open	(Indonesia) Ricky Karanda Suwardi	(Indonesia) Marcus Fernaldi Gideon (Indonesia) Kevin Sanjaya Sukamuljo	17–21, 13–21	(silver) Runner-up
2016	Australian Open	(Indonesia) Ricky Karanda Suwardi	(Indonesia) Marcus Fernaldi Gideon (Indonesia) Kevin Sanjaya Sukamuljo	14–21, 15–21	(silver) Runner-up
2017	India Open	(Indonesia) Ricky Karanda Suwardi	(Indonesia) Marcus Fernaldi Gideon (Indonesia) Kevin Sanjaya Sukamuljo	11–21, 15–21	(silver) Runner-up

BWF Super Series Finals tournament
BWF Super Series Premier tournament
BWF Super Series tournament

=== BWF Grand Prix (4 titles, 4 runners-up) ===
The BWF Grand Prix had two levels, the Grand Prix and Grand Prix Gold. It was a series of badminton tournaments sanctioned by the Badminton World Federation (BWF) and played between 2007 and 2017.

Men's doubles
Year	Tournament	Partner	Opponent	Score	Result
2011	Vietnam Open	(Indonesia) Rian Agung Saputro	(Singapore) Danny Bawa Chrisnanta (Singapore) Chayut Triyachart	21–12, 16–21, 21–19	(gold) Winner
2012	Indonesia Grand Prix Gold	(Indonesia) Rian Agung Saputro	(South Korea) Kim Gi-jung (South Korea) Kim Sa-rang	13–21, 9–21	(silver) Runner-up
2012	Chinese Taipei Open	(Indonesia) Rian Agung Saputro	(Malaysia) Mohd Zakry Abdul Latif (Malaysia) Mohd Fairuzizuan Mohd Tazari	12–21, 14–21	(silver) Runner-up
2013	Australian Open	(Indonesia) Rian Agung Saputro	(Indonesia) Mohammad Ahsan (Indonesia) Hendra Setiawan	22–20, 21–19	(gold) Winner
2013	New Zealand Open	(Indonesia) Rian Agung Saputro	(China) Li Junhui (China) Liu Yuchen	21–6, 22–20	(gold) Winner
2013	Indonesia Grand Prix Gold	(Indonesia) Rian Agung Saputro	(Indonesia) Ronald Alexander (Indonesia) Selvanus Geh	17–21, 21–15, 21–16	(gold) Winner
2014	Macau Open	(Indonesia) Ricky Karanda Suwardi	(Singapore) Danny Bawa Chrisnanta (Singapore) Chayut Triyachart	19–21, 20–22	(silver) Runner-up
2016	New Zealand Open	(Indonesia) Ricky Karanda Suwardi	(South Korea) Ko Sung-hyun (South Korea) Shin Baek-cheol	18–21, 14–21	(silver) Runner-up

BWF Grand Prix Gold tournament
BWF Grand Prix tournament

=== BWF International Challenge/Series (2 runners-up) ===
Men's doubles
Year	Tournament	Partner	Opponent	Score	Result
2009	Indonesia International	(Indonesia) Rian Agung Saputro	(Indonesia) Hendra Aprida Gunawan (Indonesia) Alvent Yulianto	17–21, 12–21	(silver) Runner-up
2015	Thailand International	(Indonesia) Ricky Karanda Suwardi	(South Korea) Jun Bong-chan (South Korea) Kim Duck-young	14–21, 21–13, 14–21	(silver) Runner-up

BWF International Challenge tournament
BWF International Series tournament

== Performance timeline ==
Key

W	Won	F	Finalist	SF	Semi-finalist
QF	Quarter-finalist	#R	Rounds 4, 3, 2, 1	RR	Round-robin stage
Q#	Qualification round	A	Absent	w/d	Withdrew
G	Gold	S	Silver	B	Bronze
NH	Not held	N/A	Not applicable	DNQ	Did not qualify

=== National team ===
- Senior level

Team events	2014	2015	2016	2017	2018
Southeast Asian Games	NH	G	NH	A	NH
Asia Championships	NH		G	NH	G
Asia Mixed Team Championships	NH			QF	NH

Team event	2011
Universiade	G

Team events	2014	2015	2016	2017	2018
Thomas Cup	B	NH	S	NH	A
Sudirman Cup	NH	B	NH	RR	NH

=== Individual competitions ===
==== Junior level ====
- Boys' doubles

Events	2009
Asian Junior Championships	G
World Junior Championships	B

- Mixed ' doubles

Events	2009
World Junior Championships	S

==== Senior level ====
===== Men's doubles =====
Event	2013	2015
Southeast Asian Games	G	G

Event	2012	2016	2017	2018
Asian Championships	2R	2R	2R	2R

Event	2014
Asian Games	QF

Event	2013	2014	2015	2017
World Championships	QF	QF	QF	3R

Tournament	BWF Super Series / Grand Prix								BWF World Tour					Best
Tournament	2010	2011	2012	2013	2014	2015	2016	2017	2018	2019	2020	2021	2022	Best
India Open	w/d	F	SF	SF	2R	A	F	F	QF	F	NH		A	F ('11, '16, '17, '19)
Syed Modi International	A			NH	A		2R	A			NH		A	2R ('16)
German Open	A								2R	A	NH		A	2R ('18)
All England Open	A	Q1	1R	1R	QF	2R	2R	2R	1R	A				QF ('14)
Swiss Open	A		2R	2R	A	2R	A				NH	A		2R ('12, '13, '15)
Korea Open	A	Q1	1R	A		2R	A				NH		A	2R ('15)
Thailand Open	NH	A			NH	SF	A			1R	A	NH	A	SF ('15)
Indonesia Masters	2R	1R	F	W	A	QF	SF	NH	1R	A	Q2	A		W ('13)
Indonesia Open	Q1	QF	1R	1R	2R	1R	1R	2R	2R	2R	NH	A		QF ('11)
Malaysia Open	A	1R	2R	2R	SF	QF	2R	1R	A	1R	NH		A	SF ('14)
Malaysia Masters	QF	1R	A			SF	w/d	A				NH	A	SF ('15)
Singapore Open	A	Q1	2R	1R	2R	W	QF	QF	SF	1R	NH		A	W ('15)
Chinese Taipei Open	A		F	A		QF	A				NH		A	F ('12)
Akita Masters	NA								A	2R	NH			2R ('19)
Japan Open	2R	1R	A	2R	SF	SF	A	w/d	1R	A	NH		A	SF ('14, '15)
Vietnam Open	A	W	A						w/d	2R	NH		A	W ('11)
Indonesia Masters Super 100	NA								A	1R	NH		Q2	1R ('19)
Denmark Open	A	1R	2R	1R	A	2R	SF	SF	A					SF ('16, '17)
French Open	A	QF	2R	1R	A	2R	SF	A			NH	A		SF ('16)
Bitburger Open	QF	A												QF ('10)
Macau Open	2R	2R	A		F	A					NH			F (2014)
Hong Kong Open	2R	A	2R	w/d	1R	QF	2R	2R	A	1R	NH			QF ('15)
Australian Open	A		SF	W	1R	A	F	1R	A		NH			W ('13)
New Zealand Open	NH	NA	NH	W	A		F	A			NH			W ('13)
China Open	A	2R	A	1R	A	1R	1R	1R	QF	A	NH			QF ('18)
China Masters	A	1R	A		A	1R	A				NH			1R ('11, '15)
BWF Superseries Finals	DNQ						RR	DNQ						RR ('16)
Dutch Open	A							2R	A		NH	NA		2R ('17)
Year-end ranking	51	21	17	10	14	10	7	12	70	47	44			7
Tournament	2010	2011	2012	2013	2014	2015	2016	2017	2018	2019	2020	2021	2022	Best

===== Mixed doubles =====
Tournament	BWF World Tour	Best
Tournament	2019	Best
Vietnam Open	1R	1R ('19)
Year-end ranking	681	650

== Record against selected opponents ==
Men's doubles results against World Superseries finalists, World Superseries Finals semifinalists, World Championships semifinalists, and Olympic quarterfinalists paired with:

=== Ricky Karanda Suwardi ===
- (China) Cai Yun & Lu Kai 1–1
- (China) Chai Biao & Hong Wei 0–1
- (China) Fu Haifeng & Zhang Nan 1–1
- (China) Li Junhui & Liu Yuchen 1–2
- (China) Liu Xiaolong & Qiu Zihan 1–2
- (Chinese Taipei) Lee Sheng-mu & Tsai Chia-hsin 1–0
- (Denmark) Mads Pieler Kolding & Mads Conrad-Petersen 1–1
- (Denmark) Mathias Boe & Carsten Mogensen 0–5
- (Indonesia) Marcus Fernaldi Gideon & Kevin Sanjaya Sukamuljo 1–4
- (Japan) Kenichi Hayakawa & Hiroyuki Endo 2–2
- (Japan) Takeshi Kamura & Keigo Sonoda 5–1
- (South Korea) Kim Gi-jung & Kim Sa-rang 3–1
- (South Korea) Ko Sung-hyun & Shin Baek-cheol 1–1
- (South Korea) Lee Yong-dae & Yoo Yeon-seong 1–5
- (Malaysia) Goh V Shem & Tan Wee Kiong 2–0
- (Malaysia) Koo Kien Keat & Tan Boon Heong 0–1

=== Rian Agung Saputro ===
- (China) Cai Yun & Fu Haifeng 2–1
- (China) Chai Biao & Guo Zhendong 1–2
- (China) Chai Biao & Hong Wei 1–0
- (China) Hong Wei & Shen Ye 0–2
- (China) Liu Xiaolong & Qiu Zihan 3–1
- (Chinese Taipei) Lee Sheng-mu & Tsai Chia-hsin 0–2
- (Denmark) Jonas Rasmussen & Mads Conrad-Petersen 0–1
- (Denmark) Mads Pieler Kolding & Mads Conrad-Petersen 2–1
- (Denmark) Mathias Boe & Carsten Mogensen 0–3
- (Indonesia) Bona Septano & Mohammad Ahsan 1–2
- (Indonesia) Hendra Aprida Gunawan & Alvent Yulianto Chandra 1–1
- (Indonesia) Markis Kido & Hendra Setiawan 0–2
- (Indonesia) Mohammad Ahsan & Hendra Setiawan 1–1
- (Japan) Hirokatsu Hashimoto & Noriyasu Hirata 1–4
- (Japan) Hiroyuki Endo & Kenichi Hayakawa 2–4
- (Japan) Takeshi Kamura & Keigo Sonoda 0–1
- (South Korea) Cho Gun-woo & Kwon Yi-goo 0–2
- (South Korea) Jung Jae-sung & Lee Yong-dae 1–1
- (South Korea) Kim Gi-jung & Kim Sa-rang 0–4
- (South Korea) Ko Sung-hyun & Lee Yong-dae 0–1
- (South Korea) Ko Sung-hyun & Shin Baek-cheol 0–1
- (South Korea) Lee Yong-dae & Yoo Yeon-seong 1–2
- (Malaysia) Mohd Zakry Abdul Latif & Mohd Fairuzizuan Mohd Tazari 1–1
- (Malaysia) Koo Kien Keat & Tan Boon Heong 1–1
- (Malaysia) Hoon Thien How & Tan Wee Kiong 1–0
- (Thailand) Bodin Isara & Maneepong Jongjit 0–2
