= Badminton at the 2013 SEA Games – Men's doubles =

These are the results of the men's doubles competition in badminton at the 2013 SEA Games in Myanmar.

== Medal winners ==
(gold) Gold	(silver) Silver	(bronze) Bronze
(Indonesia) Angga Pratama (Indonesia) Rian Agung Saputro	(Indonesia) Berry Angriawan (Indonesia) Ricky Karanda Suwardi	(Malaysia) Lim Khim Wah (Malaysia) Ow Yao Han (Malaysia) Goh V Shem (Malaysia) Teo Kok Siang

== Draw ==
First round
1	(Indonesia) Angga Pratama (Indonesia) Rian Agung Saputro
Bye
(Thailand) Wannawat Ampunsuwan (Thailand) Suppanyu Avihingsanon	21	21
(Myanmar) Thu Myat Min (Myanmar) Khine Thet	7	6
(Malaysia) Lim Khim Wah (Malaysia) Ow Yao Han	21	21
(Laos) Bounphasone Doungvilay (Laos) Phakornkham Fongmalayseng	11	7
(Cambodia) Sorlyda Chan (Cambodia) Sopheatra Leng	12	0
(Vietnam) Bảo Minh (Vietnam) Huỳnh Nguyên Khang	21	21
(Laos) Phanthasone Sengvidason (Laos) Xaysomphone Vongpachith	21	21
(Myanmar) Htoo Aung Myo (Myanmar) Lin Hiet Kyu	9	16
(Indonesia) Berry Angriawan (Indonesia) Ricky Karanda Suwardi	21	21
(Cambodia) Chanthong Sok (Cambodia) Chanmara Tep	8	10
(Philippines) Peter Gabriel Magnaye (Philippines) Paul Jefferson Vivas	12	9
(Malaysia) Goh V Shem (Malaysia) Teo Kok Siang	21	21
(Vietnam) Nguyễn Hoàng Nam (Vietnam) Dương Bảo Đức	12	9
2	(Thailand) Nipitphon Phuangphuapet (Thailand) Maneepong Jongjit	21	21

Quarterfinals
1	(Indonesia) Rian Agung Saputro (Indonesia) Angga Pratama	w/o
(Thailand) Wannawat Ampunsuwan (Thailand) Suppanyu Avihingsanon
(Malaysia) Lim Khim Wah (Malaysia) Ow Yao Han	22	19	21
(Vietnam) Bảo Minh (Vietnam) Huỳnh Nguyên Khang	20	21	12
(Laos) Phanthasone Sengvidason (Laos) Xaysomphone Vongpachith	4	6
(Indonesia) Berry Angriawan (Indonesia) Ricky Karanda Suwardi	21	21
(Malaysia) Goh V Shem (Malaysia) Teo Kok Siang	23	14	21
2	(Thailand) Nipitphon Phuangphuapet (Thailand) Maneepong Jongjit	21	21	16

Semifinals
1	(Indonesia) Rian Agung Saputro (Indonesia) Angga Pratama	21	21
(Malaysia) Lim Khim Wah (Malaysia) Ow Yao Han	16	15
(Indonesia) Berry Angriawan (Indonesia) Ricky Karanda Suwardi	21	21
(Malaysia) Goh V Shem (Malaysia) Teo Kok Siang	17	18

Finals
1	(Indonesia) Rian Agung Saputro (Indonesia) Angga Pratama	21	17	21
(Indonesia) Berry Angriawan (Indonesia) Ricky Karanda Suwardi	13	21	11
