= Berry Angriawan =

Indonesian badminton player (born 1991)

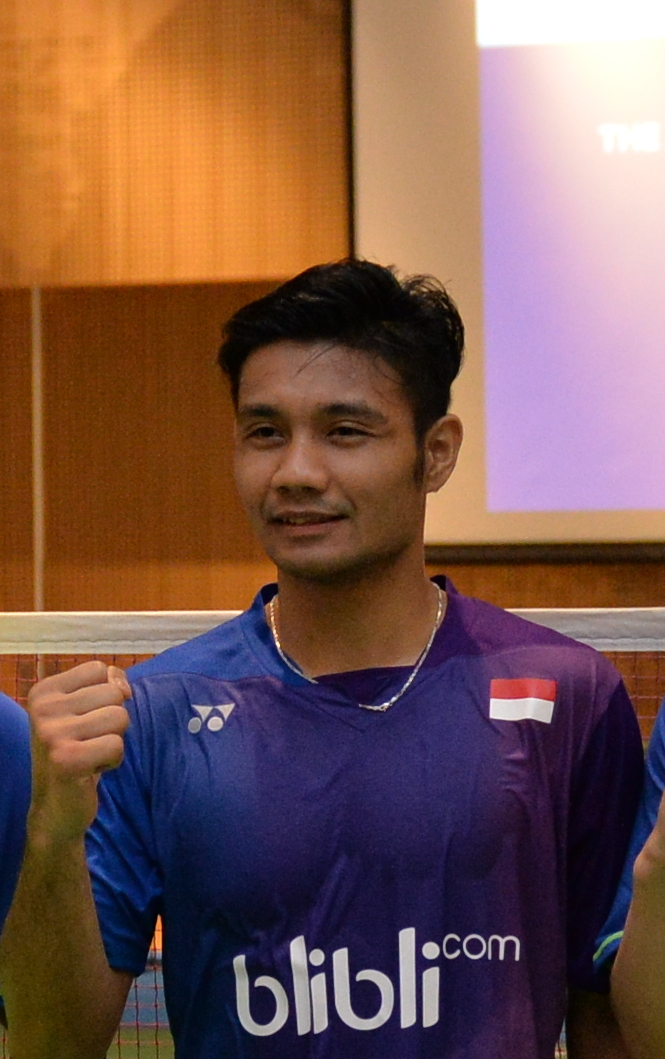

Personal information
- Born: 3 October 1991 (age 35) Sukabumi, West Java, Indonesia
- Height: 1.78 m (5 ft 10 in)
- Weight: 78 kg (172 lb)

Sport
- Country: Indonesia
- Sport: Badminton
- Handedness: Right

Men's doubles
- Highest ranking: 14 (with Hardianto 18 January 2018)
- BWF profile
Medal record
Men's badminton
Representing Indonesia
Thomas Cup
Bronze medal – third place	2014 New Delhi	Men's team
Asia Team Championships
Gold medal – first place	2016 Hyderabad	Men's team
SEA Games
Gold medal – first place	2017 Kuala Lumpur	Men's team
Silver medal – second place	2013 Naypyidaw	Men's doubles
World Junior Championships
Silver medal – second place	2009 Alor Setar	Boys' doubles

Berry Angriawan (born 3 October 1991) is an Indonesian badminton player affiliated with Djarum club. He was part of Indonesia's winning team at the 2016 Asia Team Championships and at the 2017 SEA Games.

== Career ==
=== 2023 ===
In September, Angriawan and his partner Rian Agung Saputro won the Indonesia International tournament in Medan, defeating 1st seed and fellow Indonesian pair Sabar Karyaman Gutama and Muhammad Reza Pahlevi Isfahani in rubber games.

== Achievements ==
=== SEA Games ===
Men's doubles
Year	Venue	Partner	Opponent	Score	Result	Ref.
2013	Wunna Theikdi Indoor Stadium; Naypyidaw, Myanmar	(Indonesia) Ricky Karanda Suwardi	(Indonesia) Angga Pratama (Indonesia) Rian Agung Saputro	13–21, 21–17, 11–21	Silver	

=== BWF World Junior Championships ===
Boys' doubles
Year	Venue	Partner	Opponent	Score	Result	Ref.
2009	Sultan Abdul Halim Stadium; Alor Setar, Malaysia	(Indonesia) Muhammad Ulinnuha	(Malaysia) Chooi Kah Ming (Malaysia) Ow Yao Han	21–19, 12–21, 21–23	Silver	

=== BWF World Tour (1 title, 1 runner-up) ===
The BWF World Tour, which was announced on 19 March 2017 and implemented in 2018, is a series of elite badminton tournaments sanctioned by the Badminton World Federation (BWF). The BWF World Tours are divided into levels of World Tour Finals, Super 1000, Super 750, Super 500, Super 300 (part of the HSBC World Tour), and the BWF Tour Super 100.

Men's doubles
Year	Tournament	Level	Partner	Opponent	Score	Result	Ref.
2018	New Zealand Open	Super 300	(Indonesia) Hardianto	(Chinese Taipei) Chen Hung-ling (Chinese Taipei) Wang Chi-lin	17–21, 17–21	(silver) Runner-up	
2018	Australian Open	Super 300	(Indonesia) Hardianto	(Indonesia) Wahyu Nayaka (Indonesia) Ade Yusuf Santoso	21–9, 9–21, 21–15	(gold) Winner	

=== BWF Grand Prix (4 titles, 3 runners-up) ===
The BWF Grand Prix had two levels, the Grand Prix and Grand Prix Gold. It was a series of badminton tournaments sanctioned by the Badminton World Federation (BWF) and played between 2007 and 2017.

Men's doubles
Year	Tournament	Partner	Opponent	Score	Result	Ref.
2013	London Open	(Indonesia) Ricky Karanda Suwardi	(Denmark) Mathias Boe (Denmark) Carsten Mogensen	13–21, 16–21	(silver) Runner-up	
2013	Dutch Open	(Indonesia) Ricky Karanda Suwardi	(Indonesia) Wahyu Nayaka (Indonesia) Ade Yusuf Santoso	21–14, 18–21, 17–21	(silver) Runner-up	
2015	Macau Open	(Indonesia) Rian Agung Saputro	(South Korea) Ko Sung-hyun (South Korea) Shin Baek-cheol	20–22, 14–21	(silver) Runner-up	
2015	Indonesian Masters	(Indonesia) Rian Agung Saputro	(China) Chai Biao (China) Hong Wei	21–11, 22–20	(gold) Winner	
2016	Thailand Open	(Indonesia) Rian Agung Saputro	(Japan) Takuto Inoue (Japan) Yuki Kaneko	17–21, 21–14, 21–18	(gold) Winner	
2017	Malaysia Masters	(Indonesia) Hardianto	(Malaysia) Goh Sze Fei (Malaysia) Nur Izzuddin	21–19, 21–12	(gold) Winner	
2017	Thailand Open	(Indonesia) Hardianto	(Germany) Raphael Beck (Germany) Peter Kaesbauer	21–16, 21–16	(gold) Winner	

BWF Grand Prix Gold tournament
BWF Grand Prix tournament

=== BWF International Challenge/Series (8 titles, 1 runner-up) ===
Men's doubles
Year	Tournament	Partner	Opponent	Score	Result	Ref.
2009	Auckland International	(Indonesia) Muhammad Ulinnuha	(Indonesia) Didit Juang Indrianto (Indonesia) Seiko Wahyu Kusdianto	21–14, 21–19	(gold) Winner	
2009	Lao International	(Indonesia) Muhammad Ulinnuha	(Laos) Nyothin Latsavong (Laos) Chanhda Vanhvilay	21–12, 21–11	(gold) Winner	
2010	Giraldilla International	(Indonesia) Muhammad Ulinnuha	(Cuba) Osleni Guerrero (Cuba) Alexander Hernández	21–16, 21–16	(gold) Winner	
2010	Indonesia International	(Indonesia) Muhammad Ulinnuha	(Indonesia) Rahmat Adianto (Indonesia) Andrei Adistia	21–14, 21–15	(gold) Winner	
2011	Giraldilla International	(Indonesia) Christopher Rusdianto	(Brazil) Luíz dos Santos (Brazil) Alex Yuwan Tjong	21–10, 21–12	(gold) Winner	
2015	Indonesia International	(Indonesia) Rian Agung Saputro	(South Korea) Jun Bong-chan (South Korea) Kim Dae-eun	12–21, 21–19, 21–15	(gold) Winner	
2022 (I)	Indonesia International	(Indonesia) Rian Agung Saputro	(Japan) Takumi Nomura (Japan) Yuichi Shimogami	16–21, 15–21	(silver) Runner-up	
2023 (I)	Indonesia International	(Indonesia) Rian Agung Saputro	(Indonesia) Sabar Karyaman Gutama (Indonesia) Muhammad Reza Pahlevi Isfahani	19–21, 21–19, 21–17	(gold) Winner	

Mixed doubles
Year	Tournament	Partner	Opponent	Score	Result	Ref.
2010	Giraldilla International	(Indonesia) Ni Made Claudia	(Indonesia) Muhammad Ulinnuha (Indonesia) Aurien Hudiono	15–21, 21–13, 21–14	(gold) Winner	

BWF International Challenge tournament
BWF International Series tournament
BWF Future Series tournament

=== BWF Junior International (2 titles) ===
Boys' doubles
Year	Tournament	Partner	Opponent	Score	Result	Ref.
2009	Dutch Junior	(Indonesia) Muhammad Ulinnuha	(France) Sylvain Grosjean (Republic of Ireland) Sam Magee	21–18, 21–19	(gold) Winner	
2009	German Junior	(Indonesia) Muhammad Ulinnuha	(France) Sylvain Grosjean (Republic of Ireland) Sam Magee	21–16, 21–10	(gold) Winner	

BWF Junior International Grand Prix tournament
BWF Junior International Challenge tournament
BWF Junior International Series tournament
BWF Junior Future Series tournament

== Performance timeline ==
Key

W	Won	F	Finalist	SF	Semi-finalist
QF	Quarter-finalist	#R	Rounds 4, 3, 2, 1	RR	Round-robin stage
Q#	Qualification round	A	Absent	w/d	Withdrew
G	Gold	S	Silver	B	Bronze
NH	Not held	N/A	Not applicable	DNQ	Did not qualify

=== Indonesian team ===
- Senior level

Team events	2014	2015	2016	2017
SEA Games	NH	A	NH	G
Asian Championships	NH		G	NH
Thomas Cup	B	NH	A	NH

=== Individual competitions ===
- Junior level

Event	2009
World Junior Championships	S

- Senior level

Event	2013
SEA Games	S

Event	2014	2015	2016	2017	2018	2019
Asian Championships	A		1R	A	2R	A
World Championships	2R	DNQ	NH	DNQ	3R	2R

Tournament	BWF Superseries / Grand Prix								BWF World Tour					Best
Tournament	2010	2011	2012	2013	2014	2015	2016	2017	2018	2019	2020	2021	2022	Best
India Open	QF	A			1R	A		1R	A		NH		A	QF ('10)
Syed Modi International	A	1R	QF	—N/a	A		1R	SF	A		NH		A	SF ('17)
German Open	A					QF	A				NH		A	QF ('15)
All England Open	A				1R	A	1R	A		1R	A			1R ('14, '16, '19)
Swiss Open	A				QF	A	1R	A		2R	NH	A		QF ('14)
Korea Open	A				2R	A		1R	A		NH		A	2R ('14)
Korea Masters	A		2R	A		2R	A		QF	A	NH		A	QF ('18)
Thailand Open	NH	1R	QF	2R	NH	2R	W	W	A	1R	A	NH	A	W ('16, '17)
Indonesia Masters	2R	Q2	2R	SF	QF	W	QF	NH	2R	2R	A		Q2	W ('15)
Indonesia Open	1R	Q2	Q2	2R	2R	2R	1R	1R	QF	1R	NH	A		QF ('18)
Malaysia Open	A				1R	A	2R	A	1R	1R	NH		A	2R ('16)
Malaysia Masters	A		1R	A			1R	W	2R	2R	A	NH	A	W ('17)
Singapore Open	A				QF	A	2R	SF	A	1R	NH		A	SF ('17)
Chinese Taipei Open	A				1R	1R	A				NH		A	1R ('14, '15)
Japan Open	A							1R	2R	1R	NH		A	2R ('18)
Vietnam Open	A					2R	A				NH		A	2R ('15)
Indonesia Masters Super 100	NA								A	SF	NH		Q1	SF ('19)
Denmark Open	A						1R	1R	2R	A				2R ('18)
French Open	A				2R	A	QF	A			NH	A		QF ('16)
Bitburger Open	A				QF	A								QF ('14)
Macau Open	A		2R	A	2R	F	A				NH			F ('15)
Hong Kong Open	A			2R	1R	A	1R	2R	1R	A	NH			2R ('13, '17)
Australian Open	A			QF	A		SF	A	W	2R	NH		A	W ('18)
New Zealand Open	NH	NA	NH	SF	A	2R	A		F	A	NH			F ('18)
China Open	A			1R	A		1R	A	2R	A	NH			2R ('18)
Fuzhou China Open	A							SF	1R	A	NH			SF ('17)
Chinese Taipei Masters	NA					1R	A	NA						1R ('15)
Dutch Open	A			F	A			SF	QF	A	NH	NA		F ('13)
London Grand Prix	NA			F	NA									F ('13)
Thailand Masters	NA						A	SF	SF	A		NA		SF ('17, '18)
Year-end ranking	65	88	81	55	27	27	21	16	18	42	55	74	147	14
Tournament	2010	2011	2012	2013	2014	2015	2016	2017	2018	2019	2020	2021	2022	Best

== Record against selected opponents ==
Men's doubles results against World Superseries finalists, World Superseries Finals semifinalists, World Championships semifinalists, and Olympic quarterfinalists paired with:

=== Rian Agung Saputro ===
- (China) Chai Biao & Hong Wei 1–1
- (China) Fu Haifeng & Zhang Nan 0–1
- (China) Liu Xiaolong & Qiu Zihan 0–1
- (Indonesia) Marcus Fernaldi Gideon & Kevin Sanjaya Sukamuljo 1–0
- (Indonesia) Ricky Karanda Suwardi & Angga Pratama 0–2
- (Japan) Hirokatsu Hashimoto & Noriyasu Hirata 0–1
- (Japan) Takeshi Kamura & Keigo Sonoda 2–2
- (Japan) Hiroyuki Endo & Kenichi Hayakawa 0–2
- (South Korea) Kim Gi-jung & Kim Sa-rang 1–2
- (South Korea) Ko Sung-hyun & Shin Baek-cheol 0–1
- (South Korea) Lee Yong-dae & Yoo Yeon-seong 0–1
- (Malaysia) Koo Kien Keat & Tan Boon Heong 1–1

=== Ricky Karanda Suwardi ===
- (China) Cai Yun & Lu Kai 0–1
- (China) Hong Wei & Fu Haifeng 0–1
- (China) Liu Xiaolong & Qiu Zihan 0–1
- (Chinese Taipei) Lee Sheng-mu & Tsai Chia-hsin 0–2
- (Denmark) Mads Pieler Kolding & Mads Conrad-Petersen 1–0
- (Denmark) Mathias Boe & Carsten Mogensen 0–1
- (Indonesia) Angga Pratama & Rian Agung Saputra 1–0
- (Indonesia) Markis Kido & Marcus Fernaldi Gideon 0–1
- (Japan) Hirokatsu Hashimoto & Noriyasu Hirata 1–0
- (Japan) Kenichi Hayakawa & Hiroyuki Endo 2–1
- (South Korea) Ko Sung-hyun & Shin Baek-cheol 0–1

=== Hardianto ===
- (Malaysia) Goh V Shem & Tan Wee Kiong 1-0
- (England) Marcus Ellis & Chris Langridge 1-0
- (Japan) Takeshi Kamura & Keigo Sonoda 0–1
