= Chooi Kah Ming =

Malaysian badminton player

Andrew Chooi Kah Ming 徐家铭
Personal information
- Born: 25 February 1991 (age 35) Kuantan, Pahang, Malaysia

Sport
- Country: Malaysia
- Sport: Badminton
- Handedness: Right

Men's & mixed doubles
- Highest ranking: 25 (MD 2 May 2013); 136 (XD 18 July 2013)
- BWF profile
Medal record
Men's badminton
Representing Malaysia
World Junior Championships
| Gold medal – first place | 2009 Alor Setar | Boys' doubles |
| Silver medal – second place | 2009 Alor Setar | Mixed team |
| Bronze medal – third place | 2008 Pune | Boys' doubles |
| Bronze medal – third place | 2008 Pune | Mixed team |
Asian Junior Championships
| Gold medal – first place | 2009 Kuala Lumpur | Mixed team |
| Bronze medal – third place | 2008 Kuala Lumpur | Mixed team |

Andrew Chooi Kah Ming (Chinese: 徐家銘; Jyutping: Ceoi4 Gaa1 Ming4; Pe̍h-ōe-jī: Chhî Ka-bêng; born 25 February 1991) is a Malaysian retired badminton player. He won the boys' doubles title at the 2009 World Junior Championships partnered with Ow Yao Han. Chooi played with several partners but it was with Ow that he secured his career best by finishing runners-up at the 2012 Malaysia Open Grand Prix Gold. Their highest ranking was number 25 in May 2013. Chooi retired from badminton in 2019, and started a new career as an entrepreneur.

== Achievements ==
=== BWF World Junior Championships ===
Boys' doubles
| Year | Venue | Partner | Opponent | Score | Result |
|---|---|---|---|---|---|
| 2008 | Shree Shiv Chhatrapati Badminton Hall; Pune, India | (Malaysia) Pang Zheng Lin | (China) Chai Biao (China) Qiu Zihan | 8–21, 16–21 | Bronze |
| 2009 | Stadium Sultan Abdul Halim; Alor Setar, Malaysia | (Malaysia) Ow Yao Han | (Indonesia) Berry Angriawan (Indonesia) Muhammad Ulinnuha | 19–21, 21–12, 23–21 | Gold |

=== BWF Grand Prix (2 runners-up) ===
The BWF Grand Prix had two levels, the BWF Grand Prix and Grand Prix Gold. It was a series of badminton tournaments sanctioned by the Badminton World Federation (BWF) which was held from 2007 to 2017.

Men's doubles
| Year | Tournament | Partner | Opponent | Score | Result |
|---|---|---|---|---|---|
| 2012 | Malaysia Grand Prix Gold | (Malaysia) Ow Yao Han | (Malaysia) Koo Kien Keat (Malaysia) Tan Boon Heong | 15–21, 19–21 | (silver) Runner-up |
| 2017 | Russian Open | (Malaysia) Low Juan Shen | (Russia) Vladimir Ivanov (Russia) Ivan Sozonov | 6–11, 9–11, 5–11 | (silver) Runner-up |

BWF Grand Prix Gold tournament
BWF Grand Prix tournament

=== BWF International Challenge/Series (3 titles, 2 runners-up) ===
Men's doubles
| Year | Tournament | Partner | Opponent | Score | Result |
|---|---|---|---|---|---|
| 2013 | Malaysia International | (Malaysia) Teo Ee Yi | (Indonesia) Selvanus Geh (Indonesia) Alfian Eko Prasetya | 15–21, 13–21 | (silver) Runner-up |
| 2015 | Sri Lanka International | (Malaysia) Ow Yao Han | (Malaysia) Koo Kien Keat (Malaysia) Tan Boon Heong | 19–21, 17–21 | (silver) Runner-up |
| 2016 | USM Indonesia International | (Malaysia) Low Juan Shen | (Malaysia) Lee Jian Yi (Malaysia) Lim Zhen Ting | 21–15, 21–19 | (gold) Winner |
| 2016 | Malaysia International | (Malaysia) Low Juan Shen | (Chinese Taipei) Lu Ching-yao (Chinese Taipei) Yang Po-han | 21–9, 21–13 | (gold) Winner |
| 2019 | Lao International | (Malaysia) Low Juan Shen | (Malaysia) Ng Eng Cheong (Malaysia) Low Hang Yee | 18–21, 21–18, 21–14 | (gold) Winner |

BWF International Challenge tournament
BWF International Series tournament
BWF Future Series tournament
