= Ow Yao Han =

Malaysian badminton player

Ow Yao Han 区耀汉
Personal information
- Born: 19 April 1992 (age 34) Malacca, Malaysia

Sport
- Country: Malaysia
- Sport: Badminton
- Handedness: Right

Men's & mixed doubles
- Highest ranking: 25 (MD 2 May 2013); 122 (XD 2 December 2010)
- BWF profile
Medal record
Men's badminton
Representing Malaysia
Southeast Asian Games
Bronze medal – third place	2013 Naypyidaw	Men's doubles
World Junior Championships
Gold medal – first place	2009 Alor Setar	Boys' doubles
Gold medal – first place	2010 Guadalajara	Boys' doubles
Silver medal – second place	2009 Alor Setar	Mixed team
Bronze medal – third place	2010 Guadalajara	Mixed doubles
Bronze medal – third place	2010 Guadalajara	Mixed team
Commonwealth Youth Games
Gold medal – first place	2008 Pune	Boys' doubles
Asian Junior Championships
Gold medal – first place	2009 Kuala Lumpur	Mixed team
Silver medal – second place	2009 Kuala Lumpur	Boys' doubles
Silver medal – second place	2010 Kuala Lumpur	Boys' doubles
Silver medal – second place	2010 Kuala Lumpur	Mixed doubles
Silver medal – second place	2010 Kuala Lumpur	Mixed team

Ow Yao Han (Chinese: 區耀漢; Pe̍h-ōe-jī: O͘ Iāu-hàn;born 19 April 1992) is a Malaysian badminton player. He won two gold medals in the boys' doubles event at the BWF World Junior Championships in 2009 and 2010.

== Achievements ==
=== Southeast Asian Games ===
Men's doubles
Year	Venue	Partner	Opponent	Score	Result
2013	Wunna Theikdi Indoor Stadium; Naypyidaw, Myanmar	(Malaysia) Lim Khim Wah	(Indonesia) Angga Pratama (Indonesia) Rian Agung Saputro	16–21, 15–21	Bronze

=== World Junior Championships ===
Boys' doubles
Year	Venue	Partner	Opponent	Score	Result
2009	Stadium Sultan Abdul Halim; Alor Setar, Malaysia	(Malaysia) Chooi Kah Ming	(Indonesia) Berry Angriawan (Indonesia) Muhammad Ulinnuha	19–21, 21–12, 23–21	Gold
2010	Domo del Code Jalisco; Guadalajara, Mexico	(Malaysia) Yew Hong Kheng	(Malaysia) Nelson Heg Wei Keat (Malaysia) Teo Ee Yi	21–18, 21–15	Gold

Mixed doubles
Year	Venue	Partner	Opponent	Score	Result
2010	Domo del Code Jalisco; Guadalajara, Mexico	(Malaysia) Lai Pei Jing	(South Korea) Kang Ji-wook (South Korea) Choi Hye-in	19–21, 14–21	Bronze

=== Commonwealth Youth Games ===
Boys' doubles
Year	Venue	Partner	Opponent	Score	Result
2008	Shree Shiv Chhatrapati Sports Complex, Pune, India	(Malaysia) Yew Hong Kheng	(Malaysia) Lim Yu Sheng (Malaysia) Loh Wei Sheng	14–21, 21–13, 21–14	Gold

=== Asian Junior Championships ===
Boys' doubles
Year	Venue	Partner	Opponent	Score	Result
2009	Stadium Juara, Kuala Lumpur, Malaysia	(Malaysia) Yew Hong Kheng	(Indonesia) Angga Pratama (Indonesia) Yohanes Rendy Sugiarto	15–21, 16–21	Silver
2010	Stadium Juara, Kuala Lumpur, Malaysia	(Malaysia) Yew Hong Kheng	(South Korea) Choi Seung-il (South Korea) Kang Ji-wook	16–21, 14–21	Silver

Mixed doubles
Year	Venue	Partner	Opponent	Score	Result
2010	Stadium Juara, Kuala Lumpur, Malaysia	(Malaysia) Lai Pei Jing	(China) Liu Cheng (China) Bao Yixin	Walkover	Silver

=== BWF Grand Prix ===
The BWF Grand Prix had two levels, the BWF Grand Prix and Grand Prix Gold. It was a series of badminton tournaments sanctioned by the Badminton World Federation (BWF) which was held from 2007 to 2017.

Men's doubles
Year	Tournament	Partner	Opponent	Score	Result
2012	Malaysia Grand Prix Gold	(Malaysia) Chooi Kah Ming	(Malaysia) Koo Kien Keat (Malaysia) Tan Boon Heong	15–21, 19–21	(silver) Runner-up

BWF Grand Prix Gold tournament
BWF Grand Prix tournament

=== BWF International Challenge/Series ===
Men's doubles
Year	Tournament	Partner	Opponent	Score	Result
2011	Indonesia International	(Malaysia) Tan Wee Kiong	(Indonesia) Rian Sukmawan (Indonesia) Rendra Wijaya	13–21, 21–19, 16–21	(silver) Runner-up
2015	Sri Lanka International	(Malaysia) Chooi Kah Ming	(Malaysia) Koo Kien Keat (Malaysia) Tan Boon Heong	19–21, 17–21	(silver) Runner-up

BWF International Challenge tournament
BWF International Series tournament
