= Muhammad Ulinnuha =

Indonesian badminton player (born 1991)

Personal information
- Born: Muhammad Ulinnuha; 5 September 1991 (age 35) Surakarta, Central Java

Sport
- Country: Indonesia
- Sport: Badminton
- Handedness: Right

Men's doubles
- Highest ranking: 20 (with Ricky Karanda Suwardi) (May, 2013)
- Current ranking: 34 (with Ricky Karanda Suwardi) (October, 2013)
- BWF profile
Medal record
Representing Indonesia
World Junior Championships
Silver medal – second place	2009 Alor Setar	Boys Doubles

Muhammad Ulinnuha (born 5 September 1991, in Solo) is a male Indonesian badminton player. He is a doubles specialist.

== Achievements ==
=== BWF World Junior Championships ===
Boys' doubles
Year	Venue	Partner	Opponent	Score	Result
2009	Sultan Abdul Halim Stadium; Alor Setar, Malaysia	(Indonesia) Berry Angriawan	(Malaysia) Chooi Kah Ming (Malaysia) Ow Yao Han	21–19, 12–21, 21–23	Silver

=== BWF International Challenges/Series (6 titles, 2 runners-up) ===
Men's doubles
Year	Tournament	Partner	Opponent	Score	Result
2012	Indonesia International	(Indonesia) Ricky Karanda Suwardi	(Indonesia) Yonathan Suryatama Dasuki (Indonesia) Hendra Aprida Gunawan	21–12, 12–21, 21–16	(gold) Winner
2012	Vietnam International	(Indonesia) Ricky Karanda Suwardi	(Indonesia) Marcus Fernaldi Gideon (Indonesia) Agripina Prima Rahmanto	21–12, 21–19	(gold) Winner
2010	Indonesia International	(Indonesia) Berry Angriawan	(Indonesia) Rahmat Adianto (Indonesia) Andrei Adistia	21–14, 21–15	(gold) Winner
2010	Giraldilla International	(Indonesia) Berry Angriawan	(Cuba) Osleni Guerrero (Cuba) Alexander Hernandez	21–16, 21–16	(gold) Winner
2009	Lao International	(Indonesia) Berry Angriawan	(Laos) Chanhda Vanhvilay (Laos) Nyothin Latsavong	21–12, 21–11	(gold) Winner
2009	Auckland International	(Indonesia) Berry Angriawan	(Indonesia) Didit Juang Indrianto (Indonesia) Seiko Wahyu Kusdianto	21–14, 21–19	(gold) Winner

Mixed doubles
Year	Tournament	Partner	Opponent	Score	Result
2010	Giraldilla International	(Indonesia) Aurien Hudiono	(Indonesia) Berry Anggriawan (Indonesia) Ni Made Claudia	21–15, 13–21, 14–21	(silver) Runner-up
2009	Lao International	(Indonesia) Jenna Gozali	(Vietnam) Duong Bao Duc (Vietnam) Thai Thi Hong Gam	17–21, 23–21, 18–21	(silver) Runner-up

BWF International Challenge tournament
BWF International Series tournament
BWF Future Series tournament

=== BWF Junior International (3 titles, 1 runner-up) ===
Boys' doubles
Year	Tournament	Partner	Opponent	Score	Result
2009	Dutch Juniors	(Indonesia) Berry Angriawan	(France) Sylvain Grosjean (Republic of Ireland) Sam Magee	21–18, 21–19	(gold) Winner
2009	German Juniors	(Indonesia) Berry Angriawan	(France) Sylvain Grosjean (Republic of Ireland) Sam Magee	21–16, 21–10	(gold) Winner

Mixed doubles
Year	Tournament	Partner	Opponent	Score	Result
2009	Dutch Juniors	(Indonesia) Jenna Gozali	(Malaysia) Iskandar Zulkarnain Zainuddin (Malaysia) Tee Jing Yi	14–21, 21–13, 22–20	(gold) Winner
2009	German Juniors	(Indonesia) Jenna Gozali	(South Korea) Kang Ji-wook (South Korea) Choi Hye-in	20–22, 17–21	(silver) Runner-up

BWF Junior International Grand Prix tournament
BWF Junior International Challenge tournament
BWF Junior International Series tournament
BWF Junior Future Series tournament
