= 2010 BWF season =

2010 BWF Season
Details
- Duration: January 12, 2010 – December 23, 2010

Achievements (singles)

Awards
- Player of the year: (Malaysia) Lee Chong Wei (Male) (China) Wang Xin (Female)

The 2010 BWF Season was the overall badminton circuit organized by the Badminton World Federation (BWF) for the 2010 badminton season to publish and promote the sport. Besides the BWF World Championships, BWF promotes the sport of Badminton through an extensive worldwide program of events. These events have various purposes according to their level and territory in which they are held but those events owned by BWF seek to showcase the Sport via the widest possible quality television broadcast and build the fanbase of the Sport throughout the World.

The world badminton tournament structure has four levels: Level 1 (BWF Major Events: Thomas Cup, Uber Cup, Sudirman Cup, Suhadinata Cup, World Championships, Bimantara Cup, and World Senior Championships), Level 2 (BWF Superseries: Superseries and Superseries Masters Finals), Level 3 (BWF Grand Prix: Grand Prix and Grand Prix Gold), and Level 4 (BWF Continental Tournament: International Challenge, International Series, and Future Series). The Thomas Cup & Uber Cup, Sudirman Cup and Suhandinata Cup are Teams Events. The others – Superseries, Grand Prix Events, International Challenge, International Series, Future Series and Bimantara Cup are all individual tournaments. The higher the level of tournament, the larger the prize money and the more ranking points available.

The 2010 BWF Season calendar comprised the World Championships tournaments, the Thomas and Uber Cup, the BWF Super Series (Super Series, Super Series Premier, Super Series Finals), the Grand Prix (Grand Prix Gold and Grand Prix), the International Series (International Series and International Challenge), and Future Series.

== Schedule ==
This is the complete schedule of events on the 2010 calendar, with the Champions and Runners-up documented.

Key

World Championships
Super Series Finals
Super Series Premier
Super Series
Grand Prix Gold
Grand Prix
International Challenge
International Series
Future Series
Team events

=== January ===
Week of	Tournament	Champions	Runners-up
January 11	(South Korea) Korea Open: Host: Seoul, South Korea; Level: Superseries; Format: 32MS/32WS/32MD/32WD/32XD	(Malaysia) Lee Chong Wei	(Denmark) Peter Gade
January 11	(South Korea) Korea Open: Host: Seoul, South Korea; Level: Superseries; Format: 32MS/32WS/32MD/32WD/32XD	Score: 21-12, 21-11	
January 11	(South Korea) Korea Open: Host: Seoul, South Korea; Level: Superseries; Format: 32MS/32WS/32MD/32WD/32XD	(China) Wang Shixian	(South Korea) Sung Ji-hyun
January 11	(South Korea) Korea Open: Host: Seoul, South Korea; Level: Superseries; Format: 32MS/32WS/32MD/32WD/32XD	Score: 21-10, 25-23	
January 11	(South Korea) Korea Open: Host: Seoul, South Korea; Level: Superseries; Format: 32MS/32WS/32MD/32WD/32XD	(South Korea) Jung Jae-sung (South Korea) Lee Yong-dae	(China) Cai Yun (China) Fu Haifeng
January 11	(South Korea) Korea Open: Host: Seoul, South Korea; Level: Superseries; Format: 32MS/32WS/32MD/32WD/32XD	Score: 21-11, 14-21, 21-18	
January 11	(South Korea) Korea Open: Host: Seoul, South Korea; Level: Superseries; Format: 32MS/32WS/32MD/32WD/32XD	(China) Cheng Shu (China) Zhao Yunlei	(Japan) Mizuki Fujii (Japan) Reika Kakiiwa
January 11	(South Korea) Korea Open: Host: Seoul, South Korea; Level: Superseries; Format: 32MS/32WS/32MD/32WD/32XD	Score: 21-16, 21-15	
January 11	(South Korea) Korea Open: Host: Seoul, South Korea; Level: Superseries; Format: 32MS/32WS/32MD/32WD/32XD	(China) He Hanbin (China) Yu Yang	(China) Tao Jiaming (China) Zhang Yawen
January 11	(South Korea) Korea Open: Host: Seoul, South Korea; Level: Superseries; Format: 32MS/32WS/32MD/32WD/32XD	Score: 21-15, 21-16	
January 18	Malaysia Open: Host: Kuala Lumpur, Malaysia; Level: Superseries; Format: 32MS/32WS/32MD/32WD/32XD	(Malaysia) Lee Chong Wei	(Thailand) Boonsak Ponsana
January 18	Malaysia Open: Host: Kuala Lumpur, Malaysia; Level: Superseries; Format: 32MS/32WS/32MD/32WD/32XD	Score: 21-13, 21-7	
January 18	Malaysia Open: Host: Kuala Lumpur, Malaysia; Level: Superseries; Format: 32MS/32WS/32MD/32WD/32XD	(China) Wang Xin	(South Korea) Bae Youn-joo
January 18	Malaysia Open: Host: Kuala Lumpur, Malaysia; Level: Superseries; Format: 32MS/32WS/32MD/32WD/32XD	Score: 19-21, 21-17, 14-6 Retired	
January 18	Malaysia Open: Host: Kuala Lumpur, Malaysia; Level: Superseries; Format: 32MS/32WS/32MD/32WD/32XD	(Malaysia) Koo Kean Keat (Malaysia) Tan Boon Heong	(China) Guo Zhendong (China) Xu Chen
January 18	Malaysia Open: Host: Kuala Lumpur, Malaysia; Level: Superseries; Format: 32MS/32WS/32MD/32WD/32XD	Score: 21-15, 17-21, 21-16	
January 18	Malaysia Open: Host: Kuala Lumpur, Malaysia; Level: Superseries; Format: 32MS/32WS/32MD/32WD/32XD	(China) Du Jing (China) Yu Yang	(China) Ma Jin (China) Wang Xiaoli
January 18	Malaysia Open: Host: Kuala Lumpur, Malaysia; Level: Superseries; Format: 32MS/32WS/32MD/32WD/32XD	Score: 21-16, 21-12	
January 18	Malaysia Open: Host: Kuala Lumpur, Malaysia; Level: Superseries; Format: 32MS/32WS/32MD/32WD/32XD	(China) Tao Jiaming (China) Zhang Yawen	(Denmark) Thomas Laybourn (Denmark) Kamilla Rytter Juhl
January 18	Malaysia Open: Host: Kuala Lumpur, Malaysia; Level: Superseries; Format: 32MS/32WS/32MD/32WD/32XD	Score: 19-21, 21-18, 21-15	
January 18	(Sweden) Swedish International: Host: Stockholm, Sweden; Level: International Challenge; Format: 32MS/32WS/32MD/32WD/32XD	(Indonesia) Indra Bagus Ade Chandra	(Denmark) Viktor Axelsen
January 18	(Sweden) Swedish International: Host: Stockholm, Sweden; Level: International Challenge; Format: 32MS/32WS/32MD/32WD/32XD	Score: 21-15, 21-12	
January 18	(Sweden) Swedish International: Host: Stockholm, Sweden; Level: International Challenge; Format: 32MS/32WS/32MD/32WD/32XD	(Japan) Kaori Imabeppu	(England) Elisabeth Cann
January 18	(Sweden) Swedish International: Host: Stockholm, Sweden; Level: International Challenge; Format: 32MS/32WS/32MD/32WD/32XD	Score: 21-15, 21-10	
January 18	(Sweden) Swedish International: Host: Stockholm, Sweden; Level: International Challenge; Format: 32MS/32WS/32MD/32WD/32XD	(England) Chris Langridge (England) Robin Middleton	(Denmark) Mikkel Elbjorn (Denmark) Christian John Skovgaard
January 18	(Sweden) Swedish International: Host: Stockholm, Sweden; Level: International Challenge; Format: 32MS/32WS/32MD/32WD/32XD	Score: 21–11, 21-18	
January 18	(Sweden) Swedish International: Host: Stockholm, Sweden; Level: International Challenge; Format: 32MS/32WS/32MD/32WD/32XD	(Denmark) Helle Nielsen (Denmark) Marie Ropke	(Netherlands) Lotte Jonathans (Netherlands) Paulien Van Dooremalen
January 18	(Sweden) Swedish International: Host: Stockholm, Sweden; Level: International Challenge; Format: 32MS/32WS/32MD/32WD/32XD	Score: 17-21, 21-15, 21-18	
January 18	(Sweden) Swedish International: Host: Stockholm, Sweden; Level: International Challenge; Format: 32MS/32WS/32MD/32WD/32XD	(Denmark) Mads Pieler Kolding (Denmark) Britta Andersen	(Ukraine) Valeriy Atrashchenkov (Ukraine) Elena Prus
January 18	(Sweden) Swedish International: Host: Stockholm, Sweden; Level: International Challenge; Format: 32MS/32WS/32MD/32WD/32XD	Score: 18-21, 21-18, 21-17	

=== February ===
Week of	Tournament	Champions	Runners-up
February 1	Iran Fajr International: Host: Tehran, Iran; Level: International Challenge; Format: 64MS/64WS/32MD/16WD	(India) B Sai Praneet	(Iran) Mohammadreza Kheradmandi
February 1	Iran Fajr International: Host: Tehran, Iran; Level: International Challenge; Format: 64MS/64WS/32MD/16WD	Score: 21-19, 21-18	
February 1	Iran Fajr International: Host: Tehran, Iran; Level: International Challenge; Format: 64MS/64WS/32MD/16WD	(Japan) Rie Eto	(India) P V Sindhu
February 1	Iran Fajr International: Host: Tehran, Iran; Level: International Challenge; Format: 64MS/64WS/32MD/16WD	Score: 21-14, 26-24	
February 1	Iran Fajr International: Host: Tehran, Iran; Level: International Challenge; Format: 64MS/64WS/32MD/16WD	(India) Pranav Chopra (India) B Sai Praneet	(Iran) Ali Shahhosseini (Iran) Mohammadreza Kheradmandi
February 1	Iran Fajr International: Host: Tehran, Iran; Level: International Challenge; Format: 64MS/64WS/32MD/16WD	Score: 21-17, 21-12	
February 1	Iran Fajr International: Host: Tehran, Iran; Level: International Challenge; Format: 64MS/64WS/32MD/16WD	(Japan) Rie Eto (Japan) Yu Wakita	(Iran) Negin Amiripour (Iran) Sahar Zamanian
February 1	Iran Fajr International: Host: Tehran, Iran; Level: International Challenge; Format: 64MS/64WS/32MD/16WD	Score: 21-5, 21-12	
February 15	(Poland) European Men's and Women's Team Badminton Championships (Draw): Host: Warsaw, Poland; Level: Continental Team Championships; Format: 26 teams (M)/25 teams (W) (Round robin)	Denmark	Poland
February 15	(Poland) European Men's and Women's Team Badminton Championships (Draw): Host: Warsaw, Poland; Level: Continental Team Championships; Format: 26 teams (M)/25 teams (W) (Round robin)	Score: 3–0	
February 15	(Poland) European Men's and Women's Team Badminton Championships (Draw): Host: Warsaw, Poland; Level: Continental Team Championships; Format: 26 teams (M)/25 teams (W) (Round robin)	Denmark	Russia
February 15	(Poland) European Men's and Women's Team Badminton Championships (Draw): Host: Warsaw, Poland; Level: Continental Team Championships; Format: 26 teams (M)/25 teams (W) (Round robin)	Score: 3–2	
February 15	(Peru) Thomas & Uber Cup Preliminaries - Pan Am: Host: Lima, Peru; Level: Continental Team Championships; Format: 11 teams (M)/9 teams (W) (Round robin)	Peru	Canada
February 15	(Peru) Thomas & Uber Cup Preliminaries - Pan Am: Host: Lima, Peru; Level: Continental Team Championships; Format: 11 teams (M)/9 teams (W) (Round robin)	Score: 3–1	
February 15	(Peru) Thomas & Uber Cup Preliminaries - Pan Am: Host: Lima, Peru; Level: Continental Team Championships; Format: 11 teams (M)/9 teams (W) (Round robin)	United States	Peru
February 15	(Peru) Thomas & Uber Cup Preliminaries - Pan Am: Host: Lima, Peru; Level: Continental Team Championships; Format: 11 teams (M)/9 teams (W) (Round robin)	Score: 3–1	
February 15	(New Zealand) Thomas & Uber Cup Preliminaries - Oceania (Draw): Host: Invercargill, New Zealand; Level: Continental Team Championships; Format: 5 teams (M)/4 teams (W) (Round robin)	Australia	New Zealand
February 15	(New Zealand) Thomas & Uber Cup Preliminaries - Oceania (Draw): Host: Invercargill, New Zealand; Level: Continental Team Championships; Format: 5 teams (M)/4 teams (W) (Round robin)	RR	
February 15	(New Zealand) Thomas & Uber Cup Preliminaries - Oceania (Draw): Host: Invercargill, New Zealand; Level: Continental Team Championships; Format: 5 teams (M)/4 teams (W) (Round robin)	Australia	New Zealand
February 15	(New Zealand) Thomas & Uber Cup Preliminaries - Oceania (Draw): Host: Invercargill, New Zealand; Level: Continental Team Championships; Format: 5 teams (M)/4 teams (W) (Round robin)	RR	
February 15	(New Zealand) Oceania Team Championships (Draw): Host: Invercargill, New Zealand; Level: Continental Team Championships; Format: 5 teams Robson Shield (Round robin)	Australia	New Zealand
February 15	(New Zealand) Oceania Team Championships (Draw): Host: Invercargill, New Zealand; Level: Continental Team Championships; Format: 5 teams Robson Shield (Round robin)	RR	
February 15	(Uganda) Thomas & Uber Cups Preliminaries for Africa (Draw): Host: Kampala, Uganda; Level: Continental Team Championships; Format: 12 teams (M)/12 teams (W) (Round robin)	Nigeria	Mauritius
February 15	(Uganda) Thomas & Uber Cups Preliminaries for Africa (Draw): Host: Kampala, Uganda; Level: Continental Team Championships; Format: 12 teams (M)/12 teams (W) (Round robin)	Score: 3–1	
February 15	(Uganda) Thomas & Uber Cups Preliminaries for Africa (Draw): Host: Kampala, Uganda; Level: Continental Team Championships; Format: 12 teams (M)/12 teams (W) (Round robin)	South Africa	Egypt
February 15	(Uganda) Thomas & Uber Cups Preliminaries for Africa (Draw): Host: Kampala, Uganda; Level: Continental Team Championships; Format: 12 teams (M)/12 teams (W) (Round robin)	Score: 3–1	
February 22	(Thailand) Badminton Asia Thomas & Uber Cup Preliminaries: Host: Nakhon Ratchasima, Thailand; Level: Continental Team Championships; Format: 13 teams (M)/10 teams (W) (Round robin)	Indonesia	South Korea
February 22	(Thailand) Badminton Asia Thomas & Uber Cup Preliminaries: Host: Nakhon Ratchasima, Thailand; Level: Continental Team Championships; Format: 13 teams (M)/10 teams (W) (Round robin)	Score: 3–2	
February 22	(Thailand) Badminton Asia Thomas & Uber Cup Preliminaries: Host: Nakhon Ratchasima, Thailand; Level: Continental Team Championships; Format: 13 teams (M)/10 teams (W) (Round robin)	South Korea	Indonesia
February 22	(Thailand) Badminton Asia Thomas & Uber Cup Preliminaries: Host: Nakhon Ratchasima, Thailand; Level: Continental Team Championships; Format: 13 teams (M)/10 teams (W) (Round robin)	Score: 3–2	
February 22	(New Zealand) Oceania Badminton Championships (Draw): Host: Invercargill, New Zealand; Level: Continental Championships; Format: 64MS/16WS/16MD/8WD/16XD	(New Zealand) Joe Wu	(New Zealand) James Eunson
February 22	(New Zealand) Oceania Badminton Championships (Draw): Host: Invercargill, New Zealand; Level: Continental Championships; Format: 64MS/16WS/16MD/8WD/16XD	Score: 21-16, 21-13	
February 22	(New Zealand) Oceania Badminton Championships (Draw): Host: Invercargill, New Zealand; Level: Continental Championships; Format: 64MS/16WS/16MD/8WD/16XD	(Australia) Huang Chia-chi	(Australia) Erica Pong
February 22	(New Zealand) Oceania Badminton Championships (Draw): Host: Invercargill, New Zealand; Level: Continental Championships; Format: 64MS/16WS/16MD/8WD/16XD	Score: 21-5, 21-7	
February 22	(New Zealand) Oceania Badminton Championships (Draw): Host: Invercargill, New Zealand; Level: Continental Championships; Format: 64MS/16WS/16MD/8WD/16XD	(Australia) Ross Smith (Australia) Glenn Warfe	(New Zealand) Oliver Leydon-Davis (New Zealand) Henry Tam
February 22	(New Zealand) Oceania Badminton Championships (Draw): Host: Invercargill, New Zealand; Level: Continental Championships; Format: 64MS/16WS/16MD/8WD/16XD	Score: 21-19, 21-12	
February 22	(New Zealand) Oceania Badminton Championships (Draw): Host: Invercargill, New Zealand; Level: Continental Championships; Format: 64MS/16WS/16MD/8WD/16XD	(Australia) Leanne Choo (Australia) Kate Wilson-Smith	(Australia) Leisha Cooper (Australia) Ann-Louise Slee
February 22	(New Zealand) Oceania Badminton Championships (Draw): Host: Invercargill, New Zealand; Level: Continental Championships; Format: 64MS/16WS/16MD/8WD/16XD	Score: 22-20, 21-11	
February 22	(New Zealand) Oceania Badminton Championships (Draw): Host: Invercargill, New Zealand; Level: Continental Championships; Format: 64MS/16WS/16MD/8WD/16XD	(Australia) Glenn Warfe (Australia) Kate Wilson-Smith	(New Zealand) Henry Tam (New Zealand) Donna Haliday
February 22	(New Zealand) Oceania Badminton Championships (Draw): Host: Invercargill, New Zealand; Level: Continental Championships; Format: 64MS/16WS/16MD/8WD/16XD	Score: 21-11, 21-10	
February 22	(Uganda) African Badminton Championships (Draw): Host: Kampala, Uganda; Level: Continental Championships; Format: 64MS/64WS/32MD/32WD/32XD	(Nigeria) Jinkam Ifraimu	(Nigeria) Olaoluwa Fabgemi
February 22	(Uganda) African Badminton Championships (Draw): Host: Kampala, Uganda; Level: Continental Championships; Format: 64MS/64WS/32MD/32WD/32XD	Score: 21-15, 21-0 Retired	
February 22	(Uganda) African Badminton Championships (Draw): Host: Kampala, Uganda; Level: Continental Championships; Format: 64MS/64WS/32MD/32WD/32XD	(Egypt) Hadia Hosny	(South Africa) Stacey Doubell
February 22	(Uganda) African Badminton Championships (Draw): Host: Kampala, Uganda; Level: Continental Championships; Format: 64MS/64WS/32MD/32WD/32XD	Score: 21-17, 21-12	
February 22	(Uganda) African Badminton Championships (Draw): Host: Kampala, Uganda; Level: Continental Championships; Format: 64MS/64WS/32MD/32WD/32XD	(Nigeria) Olaoluwa Fabgemi (Nigeria) Jinkam Ifraimu	(Nigeria) Ibrahim Adamu (Nigeria) Edicha Abel Ocholi
February 22	(Uganda) African Badminton Championships (Draw): Host: Kampala, Uganda; Level: Continental Championships; Format: 64MS/64WS/32MD/32WD/32XD	Score: 21-12, 16-21, 21-14	
February 22	(Uganda) African Badminton Championships (Draw): Host: Kampala, Uganda; Level: Continental Championships; Format: 64MS/64WS/32MD/32WD/32XD	(South Africa) Michelle Edwards (South Africa) Annari Viljoen	(Nigeria) Hajara Maria Braimoh (Nigeria) Susan Ideh
February 22	(Uganda) African Badminton Championships (Draw): Host: Kampala, Uganda; Level: Continental Championships; Format: 64MS/64WS/32MD/32WD/32XD	Score: 21-6, 21-6	
February 22	(Uganda) African Badminton Championships (Draw): Host: Kampala, Uganda; Level: Continental Championships; Format: 64MS/64WS/32MD/32WD/32XD	(South Africa) Dorian James (South Africa) Michelle Edwards	(South Africa) Roeloff Dednam (South Africa) Annari Viljoen
February 22	(Uganda) African Badminton Championships (Draw): Host: Kampala, Uganda; Level: Continental Championships; Format: 64MS/64WS/32MD/32WD/32XD	Score: 21-13, 21-14	
February 22	(Austria) Austrian International: Host: Vienna, Austria; Level: International Challenge; Format: 32MS/32WS/32MD/32WD/32XD	(Indonesia) Andre Kurniawan Tedjono	(France) Matthieu Lo Ying Ping
February 22	(Austria) Austrian International: Host: Vienna, Austria; Level: International Challenge; Format: 32MS/32WS/32MD/32WD/32XD	Score: 21-12, 21-11	
February 22	(Austria) Austrian International: Host: Vienna, Austria; Level: International Challenge; Format: 32MS/32WS/32MD/32WD/32XD	(Indonesia) Fransisca Ratnasari	(Bulgaria) Petya Nedelcheva
February 22	(Austria) Austrian International: Host: Vienna, Austria; Level: International Challenge; Format: 32MS/32WS/32MD/32WD/32XD	Score: 21-15, 18-21, 21-14	
February 22	(Austria) Austrian International: Host: Vienna, Austria; Level: International Challenge; Format: 32MS/32WS/32MD/32WD/32XD	(Indonesia) Viki Indra Okvana (Indonesia) Ardiansyah Putra	(England) Andrew Ellis (England) Dean George
February 22	(Austria) Austrian International: Host: Vienna, Austria; Level: International Challenge; Format: 32MS/32WS/32MD/32WD/32XD	Score: 21-17, 21-23, 28-26	
February 22	(Austria) Austrian International: Host: Vienna, Austria; Level: International Challenge; Format: 32MS/32WS/32MD/32WD/32XD	(Japan) Rie Eto (Japan) Yu Wakita	(Japan) Naoko Fukuman (Japan) Minatsu Mitani
February 22	(Austria) Austrian International: Host: Vienna, Austria; Level: International Challenge; Format: 32MS/32WS/32MD/32WD/32XD	Score: 21-14, 21-10	
February 22	(Austria) Austrian International: Host: Vienna, Austria; Level: International Challenge; Format: 32MS/32WS/32MD/32WD/32XD	(Ukraine) Valeriy Atrashchenkov (Ukraine) Elena Prus	(Bulgaria) Stiliyan Makarski (Bulgaria) Diana Dimova
February 22	(Austria) Austrian International: Host: Vienna, Austria; Level: International Challenge; Format: 32MS/32WS/32MD/32WD/32XD	Score: 24-26, 21-17, 21-17	
February 22	Uganda International: Host: Kampala, Uganda; Level: International Series; Format: 64MS/64WS/32MD/32WD/64XD	(Nigeria) Jinkam Ifraimu	(Spain) Ernesto Velazquez
February 22	Uganda International: Host: Kampala, Uganda; Level: International Series; Format: 64MS/64WS/32MD/32WD/64XD	Score: 18-21, 22-20, 21-13	
February 22	Uganda International: Host: Kampala, Uganda; Level: International Series; Format: 64MS/64WS/32MD/32WD/64XD	(Spain) Carolina Marín	(Greece) Anne Hald Jensen
February 22	Uganda International: Host: Kampala, Uganda; Level: International Series; Format: 64MS/64WS/32MD/32WD/64XD	Score: 21-18, 19-21, 21-18	
February 22	Uganda International: Host: Kampala, Uganda; Level: International Series; Format: 64MS/64WS/32MD/32WD/64XD	(South Africa) Dorian James (South Africa) Wiaan Viljoen	(Nigeria) Olaoluwa Fabgemi (Nigeria) Jinkam Ifraimu
February 22	Uganda International: Host: Kampala, Uganda; Level: International Series; Format: 64MS/64WS/32MD/32WD/64XD	Score: 21-13, 21-9	
February 22	Uganda International: Host: Kampala, Uganda; Level: International Series; Format: 64MS/64WS/32MD/32WD/64XD	(South Africa) Michelle Edwards (South Africa) Annari Viljoen	(South Africa) Stacey Doubell (South Africa) Jade Morgan
February 22	Uganda International: Host: Kampala, Uganda; Level: International Series; Format: 64MS/64WS/32MD/32WD/64XD	Score: 14-21, 21-11, 21-18	
February 22	Uganda International: Host: Kampala, Uganda; Level: International Series; Format: 64MS/64WS/32MD/32WD/64XD	(South Africa) Dorian James (South Africa) Michelle Edwards	(Greece) Georgios Charalambidis (Greece) Anne Hald Jensen
February 22	Uganda International: Host: Kampala, Uganda; Level: International Series; Format: 64MS/64WS/32MD/32WD/64XD	Score: 14-21, 21-19, 21-7	

=== March ===
Week of	Tournament	Champions	Runners-up
March 1	(Germany) German Open: Host: Mülheim, Germany; Level: Grand Prix; Format: 64MS/32WS/32MD/32WD/32XD	(China) Bao Chunlai	(China) Chen Long
March 1	(Germany) German Open: Host: Mülheim, Germany; Level: Grand Prix; Format: 64MS/32WS/32MD/32WD/32XD	Score: 21-13, 21-10	
March 1	(Germany) German Open: Host: Mülheim, Germany; Level: Grand Prix; Format: 64MS/32WS/32MD/32WD/32XD	(China) Wang Xin	(Germany) Juliane Schenk
March 1	(Germany) German Open: Host: Mülheim, Germany; Level: Grand Prix; Format: 64MS/32WS/32MD/32WD/32XD	Score: 21-17, 21-18	
March 1	(Germany) German Open: Host: Mülheim, Germany; Level: Grand Prix; Format: 64MS/32WS/32MD/32WD/32XD	(China) Chai Biao (China) Zhang Nan	(Chinese Taipei) Chen Hung-ling (Chinese Taipei) Lin Yu-lang
March 1	(Germany) German Open: Host: Mülheim, Germany; Level: Grand Prix; Format: 64MS/32WS/32MD/32WD/32XD	Score: 17-21, 21-13, 21-15	
March 1	(Germany) German Open: Host: Mülheim, Germany; Level: Grand Prix; Format: 64MS/32WS/32MD/32WD/32XD	(China) Ma Jin (China) Wang Xiaoli	(China) Cheng Shu (China) Zhao Yunlei
March 1	(Germany) German Open: Host: Mülheim, Germany; Level: Grand Prix; Format: 64MS/32WS/32MD/32WD/32XD	Score: 24-22, 21-15	
March 1	(Germany) German Open: Host: Mülheim, Germany; Level: Grand Prix; Format: 64MS/32WS/32MD/32WD/32XD	(Hong Kong) Yohan Hadikusumo Wiratama (Hong Kong) Tse Ying Suet	(England) Robert Blair (Scotland) Imogen Bankier
March 1	(Germany) German Open: Host: Mülheim, Germany; Level: Grand Prix; Format: 64MS/32WS/32MD/32WD/32XD	Score: 15-5, Retired	
March 1	(Croatia) Croatian International: Host: Zagreb, Croatia; Level: International Series; Format: 32MS/32WS/32MD/16WD/16XD	(England) Ben Beckman	(Russia) Vladimir Malkov
March 1	(Croatia) Croatian International: Host: Zagreb, Croatia; Level: International Series; Format: 32MS/32WS/32MD/16WD/16XD	Score: 15-21, 21-16, 21-10	
March 1	(Croatia) Croatian International: Host: Zagreb, Croatia; Level: International Series; Format: 32MS/32WS/32MD/16WD/16XD	(Germany) Nicole Grether	(Japan) Kana Ito
March 1	(Croatia) Croatian International: Host: Zagreb, Croatia; Level: International Series; Format: 32MS/32WS/32MD/16WD/16XD	Score: 11-21, 21-17, 24-22	
March 1	(Croatia) Croatian International: Host: Zagreb, Croatia; Level: International Series; Format: 32MS/32WS/32MD/16WD/16XD	(Wales) Joe Morgan (Wales) James Phillips	(Croatia) Zvonimir Hölbling (Croatia) Zvonimir Đurkinjak
March 1	(Croatia) Croatian International: Host: Zagreb, Croatia; Level: International Series; Format: 32MS/32WS/32MD/16WD/16XD	Score: 21-14, 19-21, 22-20	
March 1	(Croatia) Croatian International: Host: Zagreb, Croatia; Level: International Series; Format: 32MS/32WS/32MD/16WD/16XD	(Germany) Nicole Grether (Canada) Charmaine Reid	(Croatia) Staša Poznanović (Croatia) Mateja Čiča
March 1	(Croatia) Croatian International: Host: Zagreb, Croatia; Level: International Series; Format: 32MS/32WS/32MD/16WD/16XD	Score: 21-11, 16-21, 21-10	
March 1	(Croatia) Croatian International: Host: Zagreb, Croatia; Level: International Series; Format: 32MS/32WS/32MD/16WD/16XD	(Croatia) Zvonimir Đurkinjak (Croatia) Staša Poznanović	(Austria) Roman Zirnwald (Austria) Simone Prutsch
March 1	(Croatia) Croatian International: Host: Zagreb, Croatia; Level: International Series; Format: 32MS/32WS/32MD/16WD/16XD	Score: 21-12, 24-22	
March 8	(United Kingdom) All England Open (Draw): Host: Birmingham, England; Level: Superseries; Format: 32MS/32WS/32MD/32WD/32XD	(Malaysia) Lee Chong Wei	(Japan) Kenichi Tago
March 8	(United Kingdom) All England Open (Draw): Host: Birmingham, England; Level: Superseries; Format: 32MS/32WS/32MD/32WD/32XD	Score: 21-19, 21-19	
March 8	(United Kingdom) All England Open (Draw): Host: Birmingham, England; Level: Superseries; Format: 32MS/32WS/32MD/32WD/32XD	(Denmark) Tine Rasmussen	(China) Wang Yihan
March 8	(United Kingdom) All England Open (Draw): Host: Birmingham, England; Level: Superseries; Format: 32MS/32WS/32MD/32WD/32XD	Score: 21-14, 18-21, 21-19	
March 8	(United Kingdom) All England Open (Draw): Host: Birmingham, England; Level: Superseries; Format: 32MS/32WS/32MD/32WD/32XD	(Denmark) Lars Paaske (Denmark) Jonas Rasmussen	(Denmark) Mathias Boe (Denmark) Carsten Mogensen
March 8	(United Kingdom) All England Open (Draw): Host: Birmingham, England; Level: Superseries; Format: 32MS/32WS/32MD/32WD/32XD	Score: 21-23, 21-19, 26-24	
March 8	(United Kingdom) All England Open (Draw): Host: Birmingham, England; Level: Superseries; Format: 32MS/32WS/32MD/32WD/32XD	(China) Du Jing (China) Yu Yang	(China) Cheng Shu (China) Zhao Yunlei
March 8	(United Kingdom) All England Open (Draw): Host: Birmingham, England; Level: Superseries; Format: 32MS/32WS/32MD/32WD/32XD	Score: 20-22, 21-16, 21-13	
March 8	(United Kingdom) All England Open (Draw): Host: Birmingham, England; Level: Superseries; Format: 32MS/32WS/32MD/32WD/32XD	(China) Zhang Nan (China) Zhao Yunlei	(Indonesia) Nova Widianto (Indonesia) Liliyana Natsir
March 8	(United Kingdom) All England Open (Draw): Host: Birmingham, England; Level: Superseries; Format: 32MS/32WS/32MD/32WD/32XD	Score: 21-18, 23-25, 21-18	
March 15	(Switzerland) Swiss Open (Draw): Host: Basel, Switzerland; Level: Superseries; Format: 32MS/32WS/32MD/32WD/32XD	(China) Chen Jin	(China) Chen Long
March 15	(Switzerland) Swiss Open (Draw): Host: Basel, Switzerland; Level: Superseries; Format: 32MS/32WS/32MD/32WD/32XD	Score: 12-21, 21-15, 21-17	
March 15	(Switzerland) Swiss Open (Draw): Host: Basel, Switzerland; Level: Superseries; Format: 32MS/32WS/32MD/32WD/32XD	(China) Wang Shixian	(China) Jiang Yanjiao
March 15	(Switzerland) Swiss Open (Draw): Host: Basel, Switzerland; Level: Superseries; Format: 32MS/32WS/32MD/32WD/32XD	Score: 21-15, 21-19	
March 15	(Switzerland) Swiss Open (Draw): Host: Basel, Switzerland; Level: Superseries; Format: 32MS/32WS/32MD/32WD/32XD	(South Korea) Ko Sung-hyun (South Korea) Yoo Yeon-seong	(Malaysia) Koo Kean Keat (Malaysia) Tan Boon Heong
March 15	(Switzerland) Swiss Open (Draw): Host: Basel, Switzerland; Level: Superseries; Format: 32MS/32WS/32MD/32WD/32XD	Score: 21-18 21-16	
March 15	(Switzerland) Swiss Open (Draw): Host: Basel, Switzerland; Level: Superseries; Format: 32MS/32WS/32MD/32WD/32XD	(China) Tian Qing (China) Yu Yang	(Japan) Miyuki Maeda (Japan) Satoko Suetsuna
March 15	(Switzerland) Swiss Open (Draw): Host: Basel, Switzerland; Level: Superseries; Format: 32MS/32WS/32MD/32WD/32XD	Score: 21-16, 21-13	
March 15	(Switzerland) Swiss Open (Draw): Host: Basel, Switzerland; Level: Superseries; Format: 32MS/32WS/32MD/32WD/32XD	(South Korea) Lee Yong-dae (South Korea) Lee Hyo-jung	(South Korea) Shin Baek-cheol (South Korea) Yoo Hyun-young
March 15	(Switzerland) Swiss Open (Draw): Host: Basel, Switzerland; Level: Superseries; Format: 32MS/32WS/32MD/32WD/32XD	Score: 21-14, 21-18	
March 15	(Romania) Banuinvest International: Host: Timișoara, Romania; Level: International Series; Format: 32MS/32WS/32MD/32WD/32XD	(Malaysia) Yeoh Kay Bin	(Republic of Ireland) Scott Evans
March 15	(Romania) Banuinvest International: Host: Timișoara, Romania; Level: International Series; Format: 32MS/32WS/32MD/32WD/32XD	Score: 21-19, 21-11	
March 15	(Romania) Banuinvest International: Host: Timișoara, Romania; Level: International Series; Format: 32MS/32WS/32MD/32WD/32XD	(Japan) Hitomi Oka	(Singapore) Gu Juan
March 15	(Romania) Banuinvest International: Host: Timișoara, Romania; Level: International Series; Format: 32MS/32WS/32MD/32WD/32XD	Score: 25-23, 15-21, 21-4	
March 15	(Romania) Banuinvest International: Host: Timișoara, Romania; Level: International Series; Format: 32MS/32WS/32MD/32WD/32XD	(Austria) Juergen Koch (Austria) Peter Zauner	(Singapore) Danny Bawa Chrisnanta (Singapore) Chayut Triyachart
March 15	(Romania) Banuinvest International: Host: Timișoara, Romania; Level: International Series; Format: 32MS/32WS/32MD/32WD/32XD	Score: 21-16, 21-15	
March 15	(Romania) Banuinvest International: Host: Timișoara, Romania; Level: International Series; Format: 32MS/32WS/32MD/32WD/32XD	(Singapore) Shinta Mulia Sari (Singapore) Yao Lei	(Scotland) Jillie Cooper (Scotland) Emma Mason
March 15	(Romania) Banuinvest International: Host: Timișoara, Romania; Level: International Series; Format: 32MS/32WS/32MD/32WD/32XD	Score: 21-6, 21-10	
March 15	(Romania) Banuinvest International: Host: Timișoara, Romania; Level: International Series; Format: 32MS/32WS/32MD/32WD/32XD	(Singapore) Chayut Triyachart (Singapore) Yao Lei	(Belgium) Wouter Claes (Belgium) Nathalie Descamps
March 15	(Romania) Banuinvest International: Host: Timișoara, Romania; Level: International Series; Format: 32MS/32WS/32MD/32WD/32XD	Score: 21-13, 23-21	
March 15	Mauritius International: Host: Rose Hill, Mauritius; Level: International Series; Format: 64MS/16WS/32MD/16WD/16XD	(India) Oscar Bansal	(India) Raheem A. Abdul
March 15	Mauritius International: Host: Rose Hill, Mauritius; Level: International Series; Format: 64MS/16WS/32MD/16WD/16XD	Score: 11-4 Retired	
March 15	Mauritius International: Host: Rose Hill, Mauritius; Level: International Series; Format: 64MS/16WS/32MD/16WD/16XD	(France) Elisa Chanteur	(Egypt) Hadia Hosny
March 15	Mauritius International: Host: Rose Hill, Mauritius; Level: International Series; Format: 64MS/16WS/32MD/16WD/16XD	Score: 21-13, 21-7	
March 15	Mauritius International: Host: Rose Hill, Mauritius; Level: International Series; Format: 64MS/16WS/32MD/16WD/16XD	(Mauritius) Sahir Edoo (Mauritius) Yoni Louison	(India) Raheem A. Abdul (India) Aloysius Vijay Anthony Raj
March 15	Mauritius International: Host: Rose Hill, Mauritius; Level: International Series; Format: 64MS/16WS/32MD/16WD/16XD	Score: 21-17, 22-20	
March 15	Mauritius International: Host: Rose Hill, Mauritius; Level: International Series; Format: 64MS/16WS/32MD/16WD/16XD	(Australia) Leisha Cooper (Mauritius) Yeldi Louison	(Mauritius) Amrita Sawaram (Mauritius) Shama Aboobakar
March 15	Mauritius International: Host: Rose Hill, Mauritius; Level: International Series; Format: 64MS/16WS/32MD/16WD/16XD	Score:	
March 15	Mauritius International: Host: Rose Hill, Mauritius; Level: International Series; Format: 64MS/16WS/32MD/16WD/16XD	(Indonesia) Yoga Ukikasah (Mauritius) Karen Foo Kune	(Réunion) Oliver Fossy (France) Elisa Chanteur
March 15	Mauritius International: Host: Rose Hill, Mauritius; Level: International Series; Format: 64MS/16WS/32MD/16WD/16XD	Score: 22-20, 22-20	
March 22	(Poland) Polish International: Host: Białystok, Poland; Level: International Challenge; Format: 32MS/32WS/32MD/32WD/32XD	(Spain) Pablo Abián	(Japan) Hiroyuki Saeki
March 22	(Poland) Polish International: Host: Białystok, Poland; Level: International Challenge; Format: 32MS/32WS/32MD/32WD/32XD	Score: 21-12, 21-10	
March 22	(Poland) Polish International: Host: Białystok, Poland; Level: International Challenge; Format: 32MS/32WS/32MD/32WD/32XD	(Japan) Kana Ito	(Hong Kong) Chan Tsz Ka
March 22	(Poland) Polish International: Host: Białystok, Poland; Level: International Challenge; Format: 32MS/32WS/32MD/32WD/32XD	Score: 21-14, 21-18	
March 22	(Poland) Polish International: Host: Białystok, Poland; Level: International Challenge; Format: 32MS/32WS/32MD/32WD/32XD	(Russia) Vladimir Ivanov (Russia) Ivan Sozonov	(Hong Kong) Yohan Hadikusumo Wiratama (Hong Kong) Wong Wai Hong
March 22	(Poland) Polish International: Host: Białystok, Poland; Level: International Challenge; Format: 32MS/32WS/32MD/32WD/32XD	Score: 21-17, 14-21, 21-14	
March 22	(Poland) Polish International: Host: Białystok, Poland; Level: International Challenge; Format: 32MS/32WS/32MD/32WD/32XD	(Singapore) Shinta Mulia Sari (Singapore) Yao Lei	(Hong Kong) Chau Hoi Wah (Hong Kong) Chan Tsz Ka
March 22	(Poland) Polish International: Host: Białystok, Poland; Level: International Challenge; Format: 32MS/32WS/32MD/32WD/32XD	Score: 18-21, 21-16, 21-10	
March 22	(Poland) Polish International: Host: Białystok, Poland; Level: International Challenge; Format: 32MS/32WS/32MD/32WD/32XD	(Russia) Andrej Ashmarin (Russia) Anastasia Prokopenko	(Singapore) Chayut Triyachart (Singapore) Yao Lei
March 22	(Poland) Polish International: Host: Białystok, Poland; Level: International Challenge; Format: 32MS/32WS/32MD/32WD/32XD	Score: 21-12, 21-17	
March 22	(Cuba) Giraldilla International: Host: Havana, Cuba; Level: Future Series; Format: 32MS/16WS/8MD/8WD/16XD	(Cuba) Osleni Guerrero	(Cuba) Alexander Hernández
March 22	(Cuba) Giraldilla International: Host: Havana, Cuba; Level: Future Series; Format: 32MS/16WS/8MD/8WD/16XD	Score: 21-13, 21-17	
March 22	(Cuba) Giraldilla International: Host: Havana, Cuba; Level: Future Series; Format: 32MS/16WS/8MD/8WD/16XD	(Indonesia) Siti Anida Lestari Quryantin	(Cuba) María L Hernández
March 22	(Cuba) Giraldilla International: Host: Havana, Cuba; Level: Future Series; Format: 32MS/16WS/8MD/8WD/16XD	Score: 21-9, 21-16	
March 22	(Cuba) Giraldilla International: Host: Havana, Cuba; Level: Future Series; Format: 32MS/16WS/8MD/8WD/16XD	(Indonesia) Berry Anggriawan (Indonesia) Muhammad Ulinnuha	(Cuba) Osleni Guerrero (Cuba) Alexander Hernández
March 22	(Cuba) Giraldilla International: Host: Havana, Cuba; Level: Future Series; Format: 32MS/16WS/8MD/8WD/16XD	Score: 21-16, 21-16	
March 22	(Cuba) Giraldilla International: Host: Havana, Cuba; Level: Future Series; Format: 32MS/16WS/8MD/8WD/16XD	(Indonesia) Aurien Hudiono (Indonesia) Ni Made Claudia	(Cuba) Yudmila Capdevila (Cuba) María L Hernández
March 22	(Cuba) Giraldilla International: Host: Havana, Cuba; Level: Future Series; Format: 32MS/16WS/8MD/8WD/16XD	Score: 21-12, 21-10	
March 22	(Cuba) Giraldilla International: Host: Havana, Cuba; Level: Future Series; Format: 32MS/16WS/8MD/8WD/16XD	(Indonesia) Berry Anggriawan (Indonesia) Ni Made Claudia	(Indonesia) Muhammad Ulinnuha (Indonesia) Aurien Hudiono
March 22	(Cuba) Giraldilla International: Host: Havana, Cuba; Level: Future Series; Format: 32MS/16WS/8MD/8WD/16XD	Score: 15-21, 21-13, 21-14	
March 22	Kenya International: Host: Nairobi, Kenya; Level: International Series; Format: 64MS/32WS/32MD/16WD/16XD	(India) Oscar Bansal	(Scotland) Alistar Casey
March 22	Kenya International: Host: Nairobi, Kenya; Level: International Series; Format: 64MS/32WS/32MD/16WD/16XD	Score: 14-21, 21-13, 21-19	
March 22	Kenya International: Host: Nairobi, Kenya; Level: International Series; Format: 64MS/32WS/32MD/16WD/16XD	(Greece) Anne Hald Jensen	(Nigeria) Grace Gabriel
March 22	Kenya International: Host: Nairobi, Kenya; Level: International Series; Format: 64MS/32WS/32MD/16WD/16XD	Score: 21-6, 21-10	
March 22	Kenya International: Host: Nairobi, Kenya; Level: International Series; Format: 64MS/32WS/32MD/16WD/16XD	(South Africa) Dorian James (South Africa) Wiaan Viljoen	(Nigeria) Jinkam Ifraimu Bulus (Nigeria) Olaoluwa Fagbemi
March 22	Kenya International: Host: Nairobi, Kenya; Level: International Series; Format: 64MS/32WS/32MD/16WD/16XD	Score: 22-20, 21-17	
March 22	Kenya International: Host: Nairobi, Kenya; Level: International Series; Format: 64MS/32WS/32MD/16WD/16XD	(South Africa) Anna Viljoen (South Africa) Michelle Edwards	(Nigeria) Maria Braimoh (Nigeria) Susan Ideh
March 22	Kenya International: Host: Nairobi, Kenya; Level: International Series; Format: 64MS/32WS/32MD/16WD/16XD	Score: 21-10, 12-21, 21-10	
March 22	Kenya International: Host: Nairobi, Kenya; Level: International Series; Format: 64MS/32WS/32MD/16WD/16XD	(South Africa) Wiaan Viljoen (South Africa) Anna Viljoen	(Nigeria) Jinkam Ifraimu Bulus (Nigeria) Susan Ideh
March 22	Kenya International: Host: Nairobi, Kenya; Level: International Series; Format: 64MS/32WS/32MD/16WD/16XD	Score: 21-12, 21-10	

=== April ===
Week of	Tournament	Champions	Runners-up
April 1	(New Zealand) Canterbury International: Host: Christchurch, New Zealand; Level: Future Series; Format: 32MS/16WS/16MD/8WD/32XD	(New Zealand) James Eunson	(New Zealand) Bjorn Seguin
April 1	(New Zealand) Canterbury International: Host: Christchurch, New Zealand; Level: Future Series; Format: 32MS/16WS/16MD/8WD/32XD	Score: 19-21, 21-18, 21-18	
April 1	(New Zealand) Canterbury International: Host: Christchurch, New Zealand; Level: Future Series; Format: 32MS/16WS/16MD/8WD/32XD	(Australia) Erica Pong	(New Zealand) Victoria Cheng
April 1	(New Zealand) Canterbury International: Host: Christchurch, New Zealand; Level: Future Series; Format: 32MS/16WS/16MD/8WD/32XD	Score: 21-11, 21-14	
April 1	(New Zealand) Canterbury International: Host: Christchurch, New Zealand; Level: Future Series; Format: 32MS/16WS/16MD/8WD/32XD	(United States) Daniel Gouw (United States) Arnold Setiadi	(New Zealand) Oliver Leydon-Davis (New Zealand) Bjorn Seguin
April 1	(New Zealand) Canterbury International: Host: Christchurch, New Zealand; Level: Future Series; Format: 32MS/16WS/16MD/8WD/32XD	Score: 21-19, 21-19	
April 1	(New Zealand) Canterbury International: Host: Christchurch, New Zealand; Level: Future Series; Format: 32MS/16WS/16MD/8WD/32XD	(New Zealand) Emma Chapple (New Zealand) Stephanie Cheng	(New Zealand) Clare Chapple (New Zealand) Victoria Cheng
April 1	(New Zealand) Canterbury International: Host: Christchurch, New Zealand; Level: Future Series; Format: 32MS/16WS/16MD/8WD/32XD	Score: 21-15, 21-13	
April 1	(New Zealand) Canterbury International: Host: Christchurch, New Zealand; Level: Future Series; Format: 32MS/16WS/16MD/8WD/32XD	(New Zealand) Oliver Leydon-Davis (New Zealand) Louise McKenzie	(New Zealand) Joe Wu (New Zealand) Donna Haliday
April 1	(New Zealand) Canterbury International: Host: Christchurch, New Zealand; Level: Future Series; Format: 32MS/16WS/16MD/8WD/32XD	Score: 19-21, 21-19, 25-23	
April 5	(Japan) Osaka International: Host: Osaka, Japan; Level: International Challenge; Format: 32MS/32WS/32MD/32WD/32XD	(Japan) Sho Sasaki	(Japan) Kazushi Yamada
April 5	(Japan) Osaka International: Host: Osaka, Japan; Level: International Challenge; Format: 32MS/32WS/32MD/32WD/32XD	Score: 21-14, 21-17	
April 5	(Japan) Osaka International: Host: Osaka, Japan; Level: International Challenge; Format: 32MS/32WS/32MD/32WD/32XD	(Macau) Wang Rong	(Japan) Kaori Imabeppu
April 5	(Japan) Osaka International: Host: Osaka, Japan; Level: International Challenge; Format: 32MS/32WS/32MD/32WD/32XD	Score: 20-22, 21-19, 21-17	
April 5	(Japan) Osaka International: Host: Osaka, Japan; Level: International Challenge; Format: 32MS/32WS/32MD/32WD/32XD	(Japan) Hirokatsu Hashimoto (Japan) Noriyasu Hirata	(Japan) Hiroyuki Endo (Japan) Yoshiteru Hirobe
April 5	(Japan) Osaka International: Host: Osaka, Japan; Level: International Challenge; Format: 32MS/32WS/32MD/32WD/32XD	Score: 16-21, 23-21, 21-17	
April 5	(Japan) Osaka International: Host: Osaka, Japan; Level: International Challenge; Format: 32MS/32WS/32MD/32WD/32XD	(Japan) Mizuki Fujii (Japan) Reika Kakiiwa	(Japan) Ayaka Takahashi (Japan) Misaki Matsutomo
April 5	(Japan) Osaka International: Host: Osaka, Japan; Level: International Challenge; Format: 32MS/32WS/32MD/32WD/32XD	Score: 21-19, 21-16	
April 5	(Japan) Osaka International: Host: Osaka, Japan; Level: International Challenge; Format: 32MS/32WS/32MD/32WD/32XD	(Japan) Kenichi Hayakawa (Japan) Shizuka Matsuo	(Japan) Hirokatsu Hashimoto (Japan) Mizuki Fujii
April 5	(Japan) Osaka International: Host: Osaka, Japan; Level: International Challenge; Format: 32MS/32WS/32MD/32WD/32XD	Score: 21-14, 21-11	
April 5	(Netherlands) Dutch International: Host: Wateringen, Netherlands; Level: International Challenge; Format: 32MS/32WS/32MD/16WD/32XD	(Denmark) Rune Ulsing	(Republic of Ireland) Scott Evans
April 5	(Netherlands) Dutch International: Host: Wateringen, Netherlands; Level: International Challenge; Format: 32MS/32WS/32MD/16WD/32XD	Score: 23-21, 22-20	
April 5	(Netherlands) Dutch International: Host: Wateringen, Netherlands; Level: International Challenge; Format: 32MS/32WS/32MD/16WD/32XD	(Denmark) Karina Jørgensen	(Republic of Ireland) Chloe Magee
April 5	(Netherlands) Dutch International: Host: Wateringen, Netherlands; Level: International Challenge; Format: 32MS/32WS/32MD/16WD/32XD	Score: 20-22, 21-14, 21-12	
April 5	(Netherlands) Dutch International: Host: Wateringen, Netherlands; Level: International Challenge; Format: 32MS/32WS/32MD/16WD/32XD	(Denmark) Mads Conrad-Petersen (Denmark) Mads Pieler Kolding	(Denmark) Mikkel Elbjørn (Denmark) Christian John Skovgaard
April 5	(Netherlands) Dutch International: Host: Wateringen, Netherlands; Level: International Challenge; Format: 32MS/32WS/32MD/16WD/32XD	Score: 21-17, 21-14	
April 5	(Netherlands) Dutch International: Host: Wateringen, Netherlands; Level: International Challenge; Format: 32MS/32WS/32MD/16WD/32XD	(Netherlands) Samantha Barning (Netherlands) Eefje Muskens	(Denmark) Maria Helsbøl (Denmark) Anne Skelbæk
April 5	(Netherlands) Dutch International: Host: Wateringen, Netherlands; Level: International Challenge; Format: 32MS/32WS/32MD/16WD/32XD	Score: 21-8, 21-18	
April 5	(Netherlands) Dutch International: Host: Wateringen, Netherlands; Level: International Challenge; Format: 32MS/32WS/32MD/16WD/32XD	(Denmark) Anders Skaarup Rasmussen (Denmark) Anne Skelbæk	(Denmark) Christian John Skovgaard (Denmark) Julie Houmann
April 5	(Netherlands) Dutch International: Host: Wateringen, Netherlands; Level: International Challenge; Format: 32MS/32WS/32MD/16WD/32XD	Score: 21-17, 21-12	
April 5	Peru International: Host: Lima, Peru; Level: International Challenge; Format: 64MS/64WS/32MD/32WD/32XD	(Japan) Yuichi Ikeda	(Japan) Hiroyuki Saeki
April 5	Peru International: Host: Lima, Peru; Level: International Challenge; Format: 64MS/64WS/32MD/32WD/32XD	Score: 21-19, 21-19	
April 5	Peru International: Host: Lima, Peru; Level: International Challenge; Format: 64MS/64WS/32MD/32WD/32XD	(Japan) Manami Ebuchi	(Canada) Michelle Li
April 5	Peru International: Host: Lima, Peru; Level: International Challenge; Format: 64MS/64WS/32MD/32WD/32XD	Score: 21-18, 21-17	
April 5	Peru International: Host: Lima, Peru; Level: International Challenge; Format: 64MS/64WS/32MD/32WD/32XD	(Canada) Adrian Liu (Canada) Derrick Ng	(Japan) Hajime Komiyama (Japan) Hiroyuki Saeki
April 5	Peru International: Host: Lima, Peru; Level: International Challenge; Format: 64MS/64WS/32MD/32WD/32XD	Score: 21-18, 10-21, 22-20	
April 5	Peru International: Host: Lima, Peru; Level: International Challenge; Format: 64MS/64WS/32MD/32WD/32XD	(Germany) Nicole Grether (Canada) Charmaine Reid	(Peru) Christina Aicardi (Peru) Claudia Rivero
April 5	Peru International: Host: Lima, Peru; Level: International Challenge; Format: 64MS/64WS/32MD/32WD/32XD	Score: 21-15, 21-10	
April 5	Peru International: Host: Lima, Peru; Level: International Challenge; Format: 64MS/64WS/32MD/32WD/32XD	(Canada) Toby Ng (Canada) Grace Gao	(Canada) Derrick Ng (Canada) Phyllis Chan
April 5	Peru International: Host: Lima, Peru; Level: International Challenge; Format: 64MS/64WS/32MD/32WD/32XD	Score: 11-21, 21-19, 22-20	
April 5	(Australia) Altona International: Host: Altona North, Victoria, Australia; Level: Future Series; Format: 32MS/16WS/32MD/8WD/16XD	(Malaysia) Yogendran Krishan	(Australia) Nicholas Kidd
April 5	(Australia) Altona International: Host: Altona North, Victoria, Australia; Level: Future Series; Format: 32MS/16WS/32MD/8WD/16XD	Score: 21-16, 21-11	
April 5	(Australia) Altona International: Host: Altona North, Victoria, Australia; Level: Future Series; Format: 32MS/16WS/32MD/8WD/16XD	(Australia) Huang Chia-Chi	(Australia) Erica Pong
April 5	(Australia) Altona International: Host: Altona North, Victoria, Australia; Level: Future Series; Format: 32MS/16WS/32MD/8WD/16XD	Score: 21-7, 21-10	
April 5	(Australia) Altona International: Host: Altona North, Victoria, Australia; Level: Future Series; Format: 32MS/16WS/32MD/8WD/16XD	(Australia) Ross Smith (Australia) Glenn Warfe	(United States) Daniel Gouw (United States) Arnold Setiadi
April 5	(Australia) Altona International: Host: Altona North, Victoria, Australia; Level: Future Series; Format: 32MS/16WS/32MD/8WD/16XD	Score: 21-16, 21-10	
April 5	(Australia) Altona International: Host: Altona North, Victoria, Australia; Level: Future Series; Format: 32MS/16WS/32MD/8WD/16XD	(Australia) He Tian Tang (Australia) Renuga Veeran	(Australia) Leanne Choo (Australia) Kate Wilson-Smith
April 5	(Australia) Altona International: Host: Altona North, Victoria, Australia; Level: Future Series; Format: 32MS/16WS/32MD/8WD/16XD	Score: 21-15, 21-15	
April 5	(Australia) Altona International: Host: Altona North, Victoria, Australia; Level: Future Series; Format: 32MS/16WS/32MD/8WD/16XD	(Australia) Raj Veeran (Australia) Renuga Veeran	(Australia) Glenn Warfe (Australia) Kate Wilson-Smith
April 5	(Australia) Altona International: Host: Altona North, Victoria, Australia; Level: Future Series; Format: 32MS/16WS/32MD/8WD/16XD	Score: 15-21, 21-16, 21-12	
April 12	(India) Badminton Asia Championships (Draw): Host: New Delhi, India; Level: Continental Championships; Format: 64MS/32WS/32MD/32WD/32XD	(China) Lin Dan	(China) Wang Zhengming
April 12	(India) Badminton Asia Championships (Draw): Host: New Delhi, India; Level: Continental Championships; Format: 64MS/32WS/32MD/32WD/32XD	Score: 21-17, 21-15	
April 12	(India) Badminton Asia Championships (Draw): Host: New Delhi, India; Level: Continental Championships; Format: 64MS/32WS/32MD/32WD/32XD	(China) Li Xuerui	(China) Liu Xin
April 12	(India) Badminton Asia Championships (Draw): Host: New Delhi, India; Level: Continental Championships; Format: 64MS/32WS/32MD/32WD/32XD	Score: 21-13, 18-21, 21-19	
April 12	(India) Badminton Asia Championships (Draw): Host: New Delhi, India; Level: Continental Championships; Format: 64MS/32WS/32MD/32WD/32XD	(South Korea) Cho Gun-woo (South Korea) Yoo Yeon-seong	(Chinese Taipei) Chen Hung-ling (Chinese Taipei) Lin Yu-lang
April 12	(India) Badminton Asia Championships (Draw): Host: New Delhi, India; Level: Continental Championships; Format: 64MS/32WS/32MD/32WD/32XD	Score: 21-19, 12-21, 21-17	
April 12	(India) Badminton Asia Championships (Draw): Host: New Delhi, India; Level: Continental Championships; Format: 64MS/32WS/32MD/32WD/32XD	(China) Pan Pan (China) Tian Qing	(Malaysia) Vivian Hoo Kah Mun (Malaysia) Woon Khe Wei
April 12	(India) Badminton Asia Championships (Draw): Host: New Delhi, India; Level: Continental Championships; Format: 64MS/32WS/32MD/32WD/32XD	Score: 21-10, 21-6	
April 12	(India) Badminton Asia Championships (Draw): Host: New Delhi, India; Level: Continental Championships; Format: 64MS/32WS/32MD/32WD/32XD	(Malaysia) Chan Peng Soon (Malaysia) Goh Liu Ying	(South Korea) Yoo Yeon-seong (South Korea) Kim Min-jung
April 12	(India) Badminton Asia Championships (Draw): Host: New Delhi, India; Level: Continental Championships; Format: 64MS/32WS/32MD/32WD/32XD	Score: 21-17, 20-22, 21-19	
April 12	(England) European Badminton Championships (Draw): Host: Manchester, England; Level: Continental Championships; Format: 64MS/64WS/32MD/32WD/32XD	(Denmark) Peter Gade	(Denmark) Jan Ø. Jørgensen
April 12	(England) European Badminton Championships (Draw): Host: Manchester, England; Level: Continental Championships; Format: 64MS/64WS/32MD/32WD/32XD	Score: 21-14, 21-11	
April 12	(England) European Badminton Championships (Draw): Host: Manchester, England; Level: Continental Championships; Format: 64MS/64WS/32MD/32WD/32XD	(Denmark) Tine Rasmussen	(Germany) Juliane Schenk
April 12	(England) European Badminton Championships (Draw): Host: Manchester, England; Level: Continental Championships; Format: 64MS/64WS/32MD/32WD/32XD	Score: 21-19, 14-21, 21-18	
April 12	(England) European Badminton Championships (Draw): Host: Manchester, England; Level: Continental Championships; Format: 64MS/64WS/32MD/32WD/32XD	(Denmark) Lars Paaske (Denmark) Jonas Rasmussen	(Denmark) Mathias Boe (Denmark) Carsten Mogensen
April 12	(England) European Badminton Championships (Draw): Host: Manchester, England; Level: Continental Championships; Format: 64MS/64WS/32MD/32WD/32XD	Score: 24-22, 22-20	
April 12	(England) European Badminton Championships (Draw): Host: Manchester, England; Level: Continental Championships; Format: 64MS/64WS/32MD/32WD/32XD	(Russia) Valeria Sorokina (Russia) Nina Vislova	(Bulgaria) Petya Nedelcheva (Russia) Anastasia Russkikh
April 12	(England) European Badminton Championships (Draw): Host: Manchester, England; Level: Continental Championships; Format: 64MS/64WS/32MD/32WD/32XD	Score: 21-18, 21-14	
April 12	(England) European Badminton Championships (Draw): Host: Manchester, England; Level: Continental Championships; Format: 64MS/64WS/32MD/32WD/32XD	(Denmark) Thomas Laybourn (Denmark) Kamilla Rytter Juhl	(Poland) Robert Mateusiak (Poland) Nadieżda Kostiuczyk
April 12	(England) European Badminton Championships (Draw): Host: Manchester, England; Level: Continental Championships; Format: 64MS/64WS/32MD/32WD/32XD	Score: 21-19, 18-21, 21-12	
April 12	(Mexico) BWF World Junior Championships (Draw): Host: Guadalajara, Mexico; Level: Suhandinata & Bimantara Cup; Format: 24T/32MS/32WS/64MD/64WD/128XD	China	South Korea
April 12	(Mexico) BWF World Junior Championships (Draw): Host: Guadalajara, Mexico; Level: Suhandinata & Bimantara Cup; Format: 24T/32MS/32WS/64MD/64WD/128XD	Score: 3-0	
April 12	(Mexico) BWF World Junior Championships (Draw): Host: Guadalajara, Mexico; Level: Suhandinata & Bimantara Cup; Format: 24T/32MS/32WS/64MD/64WD/128XD	(Denmark) Viktor Axelsen	(South Korea) Kang Ji-wook
April 12	(Mexico) BWF World Junior Championships (Draw): Host: Guadalajara, Mexico; Level: Suhandinata & Bimantara Cup; Format: 24T/32MS/32WS/64MD/64WD/128XD	Score: 21-19, 21-10	
April 12	(Mexico) BWF World Junior Championships (Draw): Host: Guadalajara, Mexico; Level: Suhandinata & Bimantara Cup; Format: 24T/32MS/32WS/64MD/64WD/128XD	(Thailand) Ratchanok Inthanon	(Japan) Misaki Matsutomo
April 12	(Mexico) BWF World Junior Championships (Draw): Host: Guadalajara, Mexico; Level: Suhandinata & Bimantara Cup; Format: 24T/32MS/32WS/64MD/64WD/128XD	Score: 21-13, 16-21, 21-10	
April 12	(Mexico) BWF World Junior Championships (Draw): Host: Guadalajara, Mexico; Level: Suhandinata & Bimantara Cup; Format: 24T/32MS/32WS/64MD/64WD/128XD	(Malaysia) Ow Yao Han (Malaysia) Yew Hong Kheng	(Malaysia) Nelson Heg Wei Keat (Malaysia) Teo Ee Yi
April 12	(Mexico) BWF World Junior Championships (Draw): Host: Guadalajara, Mexico; Level: Suhandinata & Bimantara Cup; Format: 24T/32MS/32WS/64MD/64WD/128XD	Score: 21-18, 21-15	
April 12	(Mexico) BWF World Junior Championships (Draw): Host: Guadalajara, Mexico; Level: Suhandinata & Bimantara Cup; Format: 24T/32MS/32WS/64MD/64WD/128XD	(China) Bao Yixin (China) Ou Dongni	(China) Tang Jinhua (China) Xia Huan
April 12	(Mexico) BWF World Junior Championships (Draw): Host: Guadalajara, Mexico; Level: Suhandinata & Bimantara Cup; Format: 24T/32MS/32WS/64MD/64WD/128XD	Score: 21-13, 21-18	
April 12	(Mexico) BWF World Junior Championships (Draw): Host: Guadalajara, Mexico; Level: Suhandinata & Bimantara Cup; Format: 24T/32MS/32WS/64MD/64WD/128XD	(China) Liu Cheng (China) Bao Yixin	(South Korea) Kang Ji-wook (South Korea) Choi Hye-in
April 12	(Mexico) BWF World Junior Championships (Draw): Host: Guadalajara, Mexico; Level: Suhandinata & Bimantara Cup; Format: 24T/32MS/32WS/64MD/64WD/128XD	Score: 21-15, 21-15	
April 19	Vietnam International: Host: Hanoi, Vietnam; Level: International Challenge; Format: 64MS/32WS/32MD/32WD/32XD	(Chinese Taipei) Hsueh Hsuan-yi	(Japan) Koichi Saeki
April 19	Vietnam International: Host: Hanoi, Vietnam; Level: International Challenge; Format: 64MS/32WS/32MD/32WD/32XD	Score: 21-14, 21-16	
April 19	Vietnam International: Host: Hanoi, Vietnam; Level: International Challenge; Format: 64MS/32WS/32MD/32WD/32XD	(South Korea) Lee Hyun-jin	(Singapore) Gu Juan
April 19	Vietnam International: Host: Hanoi, Vietnam; Level: International Challenge; Format: 64MS/32WS/32MD/32WD/32XD	Score: 21-19, 21-15	
April 19	Vietnam International: Host: Hanoi, Vietnam; Level: International Challenge; Format: 64MS/32WS/32MD/32WD/32XD	(Malaysia) Goh Wei Shem (Malaysia) Teo Kok Siang	(South Korea) Kim Ki-jung (South Korea) Shin Baek-cheol
April 19	Vietnam International: Host: Hanoi, Vietnam; Level: International Challenge; Format: 64MS/32WS/32MD/32WD/32XD	Score: 21-23, 21-17, 21-19	
April 19	Vietnam International: Host: Hanoi, Vietnam; Level: International Challenge; Format: 64MS/32WS/32MD/32WD/32XD	(South Korea) Jung Kyung-eun (South Korea) Yoo Hyun-young	(Japan) Rie Eto (Japan) Yu Wakita
April 19	Vietnam International: Host: Hanoi, Vietnam; Level: International Challenge; Format: 64MS/32WS/32MD/32WD/32XD	Score: 21-16, 21-18	
April 19	Vietnam International: Host: Hanoi, Vietnam; Level: International Challenge; Format: 64MS/32WS/32MD/32WD/32XD	(Singapore) Hendri Kurniawan Saputra (Singapore) Yu Yan Vanessa Neo	(Chinese Taipei) Wang Chia-min (Chinese Taipei) Wang Pei-rong
April 19	Vietnam International: Host: Hanoi, Vietnam; Level: International Challenge; Format: 64MS/32WS/32MD/32WD/32XD	Score: 23-21, 21-13	
April 19	(Finland) Finnish International: Host: Vantaa, Finland; Level: International Series; Format: 32MS/32WS/32MD/16WD/32XD	(Estonia) Raul Must	(Finland) Ville Lång
April 19	(Finland) Finnish International: Host: Vantaa, Finland; Level: International Series; Format: 32MS/32WS/32MD/16WD/32XD	Score: 21-11, 21-10	
April 19	(Finland) Finnish International: Host: Vantaa, Finland; Level: International Series; Format: 32MS/32WS/32MD/16WD/32XD	(Russia) Anastasia Prokopenko	(Germany) Karin Schnaase
April 19	(Finland) Finnish International: Host: Vantaa, Finland; Level: International Series; Format: 32MS/32WS/32MD/16WD/32XD	Score: 21-18, 21-18	
April 19	(Finland) Finnish International: Host: Vantaa, Finland; Level: International Series; Format: 32MS/32WS/32MD/16WD/32XD	(France) Sébastien Vincent (France) Laurent Constantin	(Russia) Andrey Ivanov (Russia) Andrey Ashmarin
April 19	(Finland) Finnish International: Host: Vantaa, Finland; Level: International Series; Format: 32MS/32WS/32MD/16WD/32XD	Score: 11-21, 21-17, 21-11	
April 19	(Finland) Finnish International: Host: Vantaa, Finland; Level: International Series; Format: 32MS/32WS/32MD/16WD/32XD	(France) Barbara Matias (France) Elisa Chanteur	(Finland) Jenny Nyström (Finland) Mathilda Lindholm
April 19	(Finland) Finnish International: Host: Vantaa, Finland; Level: International Series; Format: 32MS/32WS/32MD/16WD/32XD	Score: 21-12, 21-11	
April 19	(Finland) Finnish International: Host: Vantaa, Finland; Level: International Series; Format: 32MS/32WS/32MD/16WD/32XD	(Denmark) Mikkel Delbo Larsen (Denmark) Mie Schjøtt-Kristensen	(Russia) Andrey Ashmarin (Russia) Anastasia Prokopenko
April 19	(Finland) Finnish International: Host: Vantaa, Finland; Level: International Series; Format: 32MS/32WS/32MD/16WD/32XD	Score: 21-12, 21-18	
April 26	(Canada) Canadian International: Host: Montreal, Canada; Level: International Challenge; Format: 32MS/32WS/32MD/16WD/32XD	(Lithuania) Kęstutis Navickas	(France) Brice Leverdez
April 26	(Canada) Canadian International: Host: Montreal, Canada; Level: International Challenge; Format: 32MS/32WS/32MD/16WD/32XD	Score: 21-16, 18-21, 21-14	
April 26	(Canada) Canadian International: Host: Montreal, Canada; Level: International Challenge; Format: 32MS/32WS/32MD/16WD/32XD	(Japan) Hitomi Oka	(Canada) Michelle Li
April 26	(Canada) Canadian International: Host: Montreal, Canada; Level: International Challenge; Format: 32MS/32WS/32MD/16WD/32XD	Score: 15-21, 21-12, 23-21	
April 26	(Canada) Canadian International: Host: Montreal, Canada; Level: International Challenge; Format: 32MS/32WS/32MD/16WD/32XD	(Netherlands) Ruud Bosch (Netherlands) Koen Ridder	(United States) Phillip Chew (United States) Halim Haryanto
April 26	(Canada) Canadian International: Host: Montreal, Canada; Level: International Challenge; Format: 32MS/32WS/32MD/16WD/32XD	Score: 21-13, 21-10	
April 26	(Canada) Canadian International: Host: Montreal, Canada; Level: International Challenge; Format: 32MS/32WS/32MD/16WD/32XD	(Germany) Nicole Grether (Canada) Charmaine Reid	(Canada) Huang Ruilin (Malaysia) Lim Yee Theng
April 26	(Canada) Canadian International: Host: Montreal, Canada; Level: International Challenge; Format: 32MS/32WS/32MD/16WD/32XD	Score: Walkover	
April 26	(Canada) Canadian International: Host: Montreal, Canada; Level: International Challenge; Format: 32MS/32WS/32MD/16WD/32XD	(Canada) Toby Ng (Canada) Grace Gao	(Canada) Derrick Ng (Canada) Jiang Xuelian
April 26	(Canada) Canadian International: Host: Montreal, Canada; Level: International Challenge; Format: 32MS/32WS/32MD/16WD/32XD	Score: 21-23, 21-18, 26-24	
April 26	Portugal International: Host: Caldas da Rainha, Portugal; Level: International Series; Format: 32MS/32WS/32MD/16WD/16XD	(Malaysia) Kenn Lim	(Germany) Fabian Hammes
April 26	Portugal International: Host: Caldas da Rainha, Portugal; Level: International Series; Format: 32MS/32WS/32MD/16WD/16XD	Score: 21-14, 21-17	
April 26	Portugal International: Host: Caldas da Rainha, Portugal; Level: International Series; Format: 32MS/32WS/32MD/16WD/16XD	(Portugal) Telma Santos	(England) Helen Davies
April 26	Portugal International: Host: Caldas da Rainha, Portugal; Level: International Series; Format: 32MS/32WS/32MD/16WD/16XD	Score: 21-17, 19-21, 21-12	
April 26	Portugal International: Host: Caldas da Rainha, Portugal; Level: International Series; Format: 32MS/32WS/32MD/16WD/16XD	(Denmark) Martin Kragh (Denmark) Anders Skaarup Rasmussen	(Croatia) Zvonimir Durkinjak (Croatia) Zvonimir Hoelbling
April 26	Portugal International: Host: Caldas da Rainha, Portugal; Level: International Series; Format: 32MS/32WS/32MD/16WD/16XD	Score: 21-18, 21-14	
April 26	Portugal International: Host: Caldas da Rainha, Portugal; Level: International Series; Format: 32MS/32WS/32MD/16WD/16XD	(England) Alex Langley (England) Lauren Smith	(Belgium) Steffi Annys (Belgium) Severine Corvilain
April 26	Portugal International: Host: Caldas da Rainha, Portugal; Level: International Series; Format: 32MS/32WS/32MD/16WD/16XD	Score: 13-21, 21-13, 21-18	
April 26	Portugal International: Host: Caldas da Rainha, Portugal; Level: International Series; Format: 32MS/32WS/32MD/16WD/16XD	(Croatia) Zvonimir Durkinjak (Croatia) Stasa Poznanovic	(Netherlands) Jacco Arends (Netherlands) Selena Piek
April 26	Portugal International: Host: Caldas da Rainha, Portugal; Level: International Series; Format: 32MS/32WS/32MD/16WD/16XD	Score: 21-14, 18-21, 21-11	

=== May ===
Week of	Tournament	Champions	Runners-up
May 3	(Thailand) Smiling Fish International: Host: Trang, Thailand; Level: International Series; Format: 128MS/32WS/64MD/16WD/32XD	(India) Ajay Jayaram	(Malaysia) Iskandar Zulkarnain Zainuddin
May 3	(Thailand) Smiling Fish International: Host: Trang, Thailand; Level: International Series; Format: 128MS/32WS/64MD/16WD/32XD	Score: 21-10, 21-4	
May 3	(Thailand) Smiling Fish International: Host: Trang, Thailand; Level: International Series; Format: 128MS/32WS/64MD/16WD/32XD	(Thailand) Ratchanok Intanon	(Thailand) Rawinda Prajongjai
May 3	(Thailand) Smiling Fish International: Host: Trang, Thailand; Level: International Series; Format: 128MS/32WS/64MD/16WD/32XD	Score: 21-10, 21-17	
May 3	(Thailand) Smiling Fish International: Host: Trang, Thailand; Level: International Series; Format: 128MS/32WS/64MD/16WD/32XD	(Malaysia) Iskandar Zulkarnain Zainuddin (Malaysia) Muhammad Syawal Mohd Ismail	(Thailand) Patiphat Chalardchalaem (Thailand) Thitipong Lapho
May 3	(Thailand) Smiling Fish International: Host: Trang, Thailand; Level: International Series; Format: 128MS/32WS/64MD/16WD/32XD	Score: 17-21, 21-19, 21-14	
May 3	(Thailand) Smiling Fish International: Host: Trang, Thailand; Level: International Series; Format: 128MS/32WS/64MD/16WD/32XD	(Thailand) Rodjana Chuthabunditkul (Thailand) Wiranpatch Hongchookeat	(Thailand) Ratchanok Intanon (Thailand) Pijitjan Wangpaiboonkj
May 3	(Thailand) Smiling Fish International: Host: Trang, Thailand; Level: International Series; Format: 128MS/32WS/64MD/16WD/32XD	Score: 22-20, 21-11	
May 3	(Thailand) Smiling Fish International: Host: Trang, Thailand; Level: International Series; Format: 128MS/32WS/64MD/16WD/32XD	(Thailand) Patiphat Chalardchalaem (Thailand) Savitree Amitrapai	(Thailand) Maneepong Jongjit (Thailand) Rodjana Chuthabunditkul
May 3	(Thailand) Smiling Fish International: Host: Trang, Thailand; Level: International Series; Format: 128MS/32WS/64MD/16WD/32XD	Score: 21-19, 22-20	
May 10	(Malaysia) Thomas and Uber Cups (Draw): Host: Kuala Lumpur, Malaysia; Level: World Team Championships; Format: 12 Teams TC/12 Teams UC	China	Indonesia
May 10	(Malaysia) Thomas and Uber Cups (Draw): Host: Kuala Lumpur, Malaysia; Level: World Team Championships; Format: 12 Teams TC/12 Teams UC	Score: 3–0	
May 10	(Malaysia) Thomas and Uber Cups (Draw): Host: Kuala Lumpur, Malaysia; Level: World Team Championships; Format: 12 Teams TC/12 Teams UC	South Korea	China
May 10	(Malaysia) Thomas and Uber Cups (Draw): Host: Kuala Lumpur, Malaysia; Level: World Team Championships; Format: 12 Teams TC/12 Teams UC	Score: 3–1	
May 10	(Slovenia) Slovenian International: Host: Lendava, Slovenia; Level: International Series; Format: 32MS/32WS/32MD/32WD/32XD	(Spain) Pablo Abian	(Italy) Wisnu Haryo Putro
May 10	(Slovenia) Slovenian International: Host: Lendava, Slovenia; Level: International Series; Format: 32MS/32WS/32MD/32WD/32XD	Score: 21-14, 21-4	
May 10	(Slovenia) Slovenian International: Host: Lendava, Slovenia; Level: International Series; Format: 32MS/32WS/32MD/32WD/32XD	(Belgium) Lianne Tan	(Slovenia) Maja Tvrdy
May 10	(Slovenia) Slovenian International: Host: Lendava, Slovenia; Level: International Series; Format: 32MS/32WS/32MD/32WD/32XD	Score: 21-16, 21-16	
May 10	(Slovenia) Slovenian International: Host: Lendava, Slovenia; Level: International Series; Format: 32MS/32WS/32MD/32WD/32XD	(Netherlands) Ruud Bosch (Netherlands) Koen Ridder	(Croatia) Zvonimir Hoelbling (Croatia) Zvonimir Đurkinjak
May 10	(Slovenia) Slovenian International: Host: Lendava, Slovenia; Level: International Series; Format: 32MS/32WS/32MD/32WD/32XD	Score: 21-17, 21-15	
May 10	(Slovenia) Slovenian International: Host: Lendava, Slovenia; Level: International Series; Format: 32MS/32WS/32MD/32WD/32XD	(Poland) Natalia Pocztowiak (Croatia) Staša Poznanovič	(Turkey) Özge Bayrak (Turkey) Ebru Tunali
May 10	(Slovenia) Slovenian International: Host: Lendava, Slovenia; Level: International Series; Format: 32MS/32WS/32MD/32WD/32XD	Score: 21-17, 21-11	
May 10	(Slovenia) Slovenian International: Host: Lendava, Slovenia; Level: International Series; Format: 32MS/32WS/32MD/32WD/32XD	(China) Mao Hong (Poland) Natalia Pocztowiak	(Croatia) Zvonimir Đurkinjak (Croatia) Staša Poznanovič
May 10	(Slovenia) Slovenian International: Host: Lendava, Slovenia; Level: International Series; Format: 32MS/32WS/32MD/32WD/32XD	Score: 15-21, 21-13, 21-17	
May 17	(Spain) Spanish Open: Host: Madrid, Spain; Level: International Challenge; Format: 32MS/32WS/32MD/32WD/32XD	(Netherlands) Eric Pang	(Denmark) Rune Ulsing
May 17	(Spain) Spanish Open: Host: Madrid, Spain; Level: International Challenge; Format: 32MS/32WS/32MD/32WD/32XD	Score: 21-12, 21-19	
May 17	(Spain) Spanish Open: Host: Madrid, Spain; Level: International Challenge; Format: 32MS/32WS/32MD/32WD/32XD	(Germany) Juliane Schenk	(Netherlands) Judith Meulendijks
May 17	(Spain) Spanish Open: Host: Madrid, Spain; Level: International Challenge; Format: 32MS/32WS/32MD/32WD/32XD	Score: 21-16, 21-12	
May 17	(Spain) Spanish Open: Host: Madrid, Spain; Level: International Challenge; Format: 32MS/32WS/32MD/32WD/32XD	(Germany) Peter Kasbauer (Germany) Oliver Roth	(Netherlands) Ruud Bosch (Netherlands) Koen Ridder
May 17	(Spain) Spanish Open: Host: Madrid, Spain; Level: International Challenge; Format: 32MS/32WS/32MD/32WD/32XD	Score: 21-13, 21-14	
May 17	(Spain) Spanish Open: Host: Madrid, Spain; Level: International Challenge; Format: 32MS/32WS/32MD/32WD/32XD	(Sweden) Emelie Lennartsson (Sweden) Emma Wengberg	(Netherlands) Lotte Jonathans (Netherlands) Paulien Van Dooremalen
May 17	(Spain) Spanish Open: Host: Madrid, Spain; Level: International Challenge; Format: 32MS/32WS/32MD/32WD/32XD	Score: 21-16, 21-19	
May 17	(Spain) Spanish Open: Host: Madrid, Spain; Level: International Challenge; Format: 32MS/32WS/32MD/32WD/32XD	(Republic of Ireland) Sam Magee (Republic of Ireland) Chloe Magee	(Germany) Peter Kasbauer (Germany) Johanna Goliszewski
May 17	(Spain) Spanish Open: Host: Madrid, Spain; Level: International Challenge; Format: 32MS/32WS/32MD/32WD/32XD	Score: 21-11, 21-9	
May 24	Maldives International: Host: Malé, Maldives; Level: International Challenge; Format: 64MS/32WS/32MD/8WD/16XD	(India) Anand Pawar	(Sri Lanka) Dinuka Karunaratne
May 24	Maldives International: Host: Malé, Maldives; Level: International Challenge; Format: 64MS/32WS/32MD/8WD/16XD	Score: 21-14, 21-18	
May 24	Maldives International: Host: Malé, Maldives; Level: International Challenge; Format: 64MS/32WS/32MD/8WD/16XD	(India) Trupti Murgunde	(Philippines) Malvinne Ann Venice Alcala
May 24	Maldives International: Host: Malé, Maldives; Level: International Challenge; Format: 64MS/32WS/32MD/8WD/16XD	Score: 21-10, 11-3 Retired	
May 24	Maldives International: Host: Malé, Maldives; Level: International Challenge; Format: 64MS/32WS/32MD/8WD/16XD	(Pakistan) Sulehri Kashif Ali (Pakistan) Rizwan Azam	(Sri Lanka) Dinuka Karunaratne (Sri Lanka) Niluka Karunaratne
May 24	Maldives International: Host: Malé, Maldives; Level: International Challenge; Format: 64MS/32WS/32MD/8WD/16XD	Score: 18-21, 21-18, 21-15	
May 24	Maldives International: Host: Malé, Maldives; Level: International Challenge; Format: 64MS/32WS/32MD/8WD/16XD	(Japan) Okui Chinami (Japan) Yukie Sumida	(Sri Lanka) Achini Ratnasari (Sri Lanka) Upuli Samanthika Weerasinghe
May 24	Maldives International: Host: Malé, Maldives; Level: International Challenge; Format: 64MS/32WS/32MD/8WD/16XD	Score: 16-21, 21-9, 21-15	
May 24	Maldives International: Host: Malé, Maldives; Level: International Challenge; Format: 64MS/32WS/32MD/8WD/16XD	(Philippines) Kennevic Asuncion (United States) Karyn Velez	(Sri Lanka) Udara Nayanajith (Sri Lanka) Renu Chandrika Hettiarachchige
May 24	Maldives International: Host: Malé, Maldives; Level: International Challenge; Format: 64MS/32WS/32MD/8WD/16XD	Score: 24-22, 17-21, 21-13	

=== June ===
Week of	Tournament	Champions	Runners-up
June 1	(Netherlands) Badminton Europe Circuit Finals: Host: Assen, Netherlands; Format: 6MS/6WS (Round robin) 2MD/2WD/2XD 2U19MS/2U19WS	(Denmark) Rune Ulsing	(Spain) Pablo Abián
June 1	(Netherlands) Badminton Europe Circuit Finals: Host: Assen, Netherlands; Format: 6MS/6WS (Round robin) 2MD/2WD/2XD 2U19MS/2U19WS	Score: 21–10, 22–20	
June 1	(Netherlands) Badminton Europe Circuit Finals: Host: Assen, Netherlands; Format: 6MS/6WS (Round robin) 2MD/2WD/2XD 2U19MS/2U19WS	(Russia) Ella Diehl	(Scotland) Susan Egelstaff
June 1	(Netherlands) Badminton Europe Circuit Finals: Host: Assen, Netherlands; Format: 6MS/6WS (Round robin) 2MD/2WD/2XD 2U19MS/2U19WS	Score: 20–22, 21–13, 21–16	
June 1	(Netherlands) Badminton Europe Circuit Finals: Host: Assen, Netherlands; Format: 6MS/6WS (Round robin) 2MD/2WD/2XD 2U19MS/2U19WS	(Denmark) Mads Conrad-Petersen (Denmark) Mads Pieler Kolding	(Russia) Vladimir Ivanov (Russia) Ivan Sozonov
June 1	(Netherlands) Badminton Europe Circuit Finals: Host: Assen, Netherlands; Format: 6MS/6WS (Round robin) 2MD/2WD/2XD 2U19MS/2U19WS	Score: 14–21, 21–19, 21–18	
June 1	(Netherlands) Badminton Europe Circuit Finals: Host: Assen, Netherlands; Format: 6MS/6WS (Round robin) 2MD/2WD/2XD 2U19MS/2U19WS	(Denmark) Maria Helsbøl (Denmark) Anne Skelbæk	(Netherlands) Samantha Barning (Netherlands) Eefje Muskens
June 1	(Netherlands) Badminton Europe Circuit Finals: Host: Assen, Netherlands; Format: 6MS/6WS (Round robin) 2MD/2WD/2XD 2U19MS/2U19WS	Score: 12–21, 21–18, 21–17	
June 1	(Netherlands) Badminton Europe Circuit Finals: Host: Assen, Netherlands; Format: 6MS/6WS (Round robin) 2MD/2WD/2XD 2U19MS/2U19WS	(England) Robin Middleton (England) Mariana Agathangelou	(Austria) Roman Zirnwald (Austria) Simone Prutsch
June 1	(Netherlands) Badminton Europe Circuit Finals: Host: Assen, Netherlands; Format: 6MS/6WS (Round robin) 2MD/2WD/2XD 2U19MS/2U19WS	Score: 21–14, 21–14	
June 1	(Netherlands) Badminton Europe Circuit Finals: Host: Assen, Netherlands; Format: 6MS/6WS (Round robin) 2MD/2WD/2XD 2U19MS/2U19WS	(England) Toby Penty	(Czech Republic) Lukáš Zevl
June 1	(Netherlands) Badminton Europe Circuit Finals: Host: Assen, Netherlands; Format: 6MS/6WS (Round robin) 2MD/2WD/2XD 2U19MS/2U19WS	Score: 21–15, 21–14	
June 1	(Netherlands) Badminton Europe Circuit Finals: Host: Assen, Netherlands; Format: 6MS/6WS (Round robin) 2MD/2WD/2XD 2U19MS/2U19WS	(Russia) Natalia Perminova	(Romania) Sonia Olariu
June 1	(Netherlands) Badminton Europe Circuit Finals: Host: Assen, Netherlands; Format: 6MS/6WS (Round robin) 2MD/2WD/2XD 2U19MS/2U19WS	Score: 21–23, 21–12, 21–16	
June 7	India Open (Draw): Host: Chennai, India; Level: Grand Prix Gold; Format: 64MS/32WS/32MD/32WD/32XD	(Indonesia) Alamsyah Yunus	(India) R. M. V. Gurusaidutt
June 7	India Open (Draw): Host: Chennai, India; Level: Grand Prix Gold; Format: 64MS/32WS/32MD/32WD/32XD	Score: 21–13, 21–18	
June 7	India Open (Draw): Host: Chennai, India; Level: Grand Prix Gold; Format: 64MS/32WS/32MD/32WD/32XD	(India) Saina Nehwal	(Malaysia) Wong Mew Choo
June 7	India Open (Draw): Host: Chennai, India; Level: Grand Prix Gold; Format: 64MS/32WS/32MD/32WD/32XD	Score: 20–22, 21–14, 21–12	
June 7	India Open (Draw): Host: Chennai, India; Level: Grand Prix Gold; Format: 64MS/32WS/32MD/32WD/32XD	(Malaysia) Mohd Fairuzizuan Mohd Tazari (Malaysia) Mohd Zakry Abdul Latif	(India) Rupesh Kumar K. T. (India) Sanave Thomas
June 7	India Open (Draw): Host: Chennai, India; Level: Grand Prix Gold; Format: 64MS/32WS/32MD/32WD/32XD	Score: 21–12, 22–20	
June 7	India Open (Draw): Host: Chennai, India; Level: Grand Prix Gold; Format: 64MS/32WS/32MD/32WD/32XD	(Singapore) Yao Lei (Singapore) Shinta Mulia Sari	(India) Jwala Gutta (India) Ashwini Ponnappa
June 7	India Open (Draw): Host: Chennai, India; Level: Grand Prix Gold; Format: 64MS/32WS/32MD/32WD/32XD	Score: 21–11, 9–21, 21–15	
June 7	India Open (Draw): Host: Chennai, India; Level: Grand Prix Gold; Format: 64MS/32WS/32MD/32WD/32XD	(India) Valiyaveetil Diju (India) Jwala Gutta	(Singapore) Chayut Triyachart (Singapore) Yao Lei
June 7	India Open (Draw): Host: Chennai, India; Level: Grand Prix Gold; Format: 64MS/32WS/32MD/32WD/32XD	Score: 23–21, 20–22, 21–7	
June 14	Singapore Open (Draw): Host: Singapore; Level: Superseries; Format: 32MS/32WS/32MD/32WD/32XD	(Indonesia) Sony Dwi Kuncoro	(Thailand) Boonsak Ponsana
June 14	Singapore Open (Draw): Host: Singapore; Level: Superseries; Format: 32MS/32WS/32MD/32WD/32XD	Score: 21–16, 21–16	
June 14	Singapore Open (Draw): Host: Singapore; Level: Superseries; Format: 32MS/32WS/32MD/32WD/32XD	(India) Saina Nehwal	(Chinese Taipei) Tai Tzu-ying
June 14	Singapore Open (Draw): Host: Singapore; Level: Superseries; Format: 32MS/32WS/32MD/32WD/32XD	Score: 21–18, 21–15	
June 14	Singapore Open (Draw): Host: Singapore; Level: Superseries; Format: 32MS/32WS/32MD/32WD/32XD	(Chinese Taipei) Fang Chieh-min (Chinese Taipei) Lee Sheng-mu	(United States) Howard Bach (United States) Tony Gunawan
June 14	Singapore Open (Draw): Host: Singapore; Level: Superseries; Format: 32MS/32WS/32MD/32WD/32XD	Score: 21–14, 21–15	
June 14	Singapore Open (Draw): Host: Singapore; Level: Superseries; Format: 32MS/32WS/32MD/32WD/32XD	(Singapore) Shinta Mulia Sari (Singapore) Yao Lei	(South Korea) Kim Min-jung (South Korea) Lee Hyo-jung
June 14	Singapore Open (Draw): Host: Singapore; Level: Superseries; Format: 32MS/32WS/32MD/32WD/32XD	Score: 21–17, 22–20	
June 14	Singapore Open (Draw): Host: Singapore; Level: Superseries; Format: 32MS/32WS/32MD/32WD/32XD	(Denmark) Thomas Laybourn (Denmark) Kamilla Rytter Juhl	(Indonesia) Nova Widianto (Indonesia) Liliyana Natsir
June 14	Singapore Open (Draw): Host: Singapore; Level: Superseries; Format: 32MS/32WS/32MD/32WD/32XD	Score: 21-12, 21-15	
June 21	Indonesia Open (Draw): Host: Jakarta, Indonesia; Level: Superseries; Format: 32MS/32WS/32MD/32WD/32XD	(Malaysia) Lee Chong Wei	(Indonesia) Taufik Hidayat
June 21	Indonesia Open (Draw): Host: Jakarta, Indonesia; Level: Superseries; Format: 32MS/32WS/32MD/32WD/32XD	Score: 21–19, 21–8	
June 21	Indonesia Open (Draw): Host: Jakarta, Indonesia; Level: Superseries; Format: 32MS/32WS/32MD/32WD/32XD	(India) Saina Nehwal	(Japan) Sayaka Sato
June 21	Indonesia Open (Draw): Host: Jakarta, Indonesia; Level: Superseries; Format: 32MS/32WS/32MD/32WD/32XD	Score: 21–19, 13–21, 21–11	
June 21	Indonesia Open (Draw): Host: Jakarta, Indonesia; Level: Superseries; Format: 32MS/32WS/32MD/32WD/32XD	(Chinese Taipei) Fang Chieh-min (Chinese Taipei) Lee Sheng-mu	(South Korea) Cho Gun-woo (South Korea) Kwon Yi-goo
June 21	Indonesia Open (Draw): Host: Jakarta, Indonesia; Level: Superseries; Format: 32MS/32WS/32MD/32WD/32XD	Score: 21–16, 21–15	
June 21	Indonesia Open (Draw): Host: Jakarta, Indonesia; Level: Superseries; Format: 32MS/32WS/32MD/32WD/32XD	(South Korea) Kim Min-jung (South Korea) Lee Hyo-jung	(Chinese Taipei) Cheng Wen-hsing (Chinese Taipei) Chien Yu-chin
June 21	Indonesia Open (Draw): Host: Jakarta, Indonesia; Level: Superseries; Format: 32MS/32WS/32MD/32WD/32XD	Score: 21–12, 12–21, 21–11	
June 21	Indonesia Open (Draw): Host: Jakarta, Indonesia; Level: Superseries; Format: 32MS/32WS/32MD/32WD/32XD	(Poland) Robert Mateusiak (Poland) Nadieżda Zięba	(Indonesia) Hendra Setiawan (Russia) Anastasia Russkikh
June 21	Indonesia Open (Draw): Host: Jakarta, Indonesia; Level: Superseries; Format: 32MS/32WS/32MD/32WD/32XD	Score: 21–18, 22–20	
June 21	Morocco International: Host: Casablanca, Morocco; Level: International Series; Format: 32MS/8WS/16MD/4WD/8XD	(Portugal) Pedro Martins	(France) Oliver Fossy
June 21	Morocco International: Host: Casablanca, Morocco; Level: International Series; Format: 32MS/8WS/16MD/4WD/8XD	Score: 21–12, 21–11	
June 21	Morocco International: Host: Casablanca, Morocco; Level: International Series; Format: 32MS/8WS/16MD/4WD/8XD	(Egypt) Alaa Fatty	(Morocco) Rajae Rochdy
June 21	Morocco International: Host: Casablanca, Morocco; Level: International Series; Format: 32MS/8WS/16MD/4WD/8XD	Score: 19–21, 21–11, 21–9	
June 21	Morocco International: Host: Casablanca, Morocco; Level: International Series; Format: 32MS/8WS/16MD/4WD/8XD	(France) Oliver Fossy (France) Jean-Michel Lefort	(Italy) Manuel Batista (Bulgaria) Stephan Kutzhalov
June 21	Morocco International: Host: Casablanca, Morocco; Level: International Series; Format: 32MS/8WS/16MD/4WD/8XD	Score: 21–14, 21–14	
June 21	Morocco International: Host: Casablanca, Morocco; Level: International Series; Format: 32MS/8WS/16MD/4WD/8XD	(Morocco) Arba Nawar (Morocco) Rajae Rochdy	(Egypt) Dena Abudlfateh (Egypt) Alaa Fatty
June 21	Morocco International: Host: Casablanca, Morocco; Level: International Series; Format: 32MS/8WS/16MD/4WD/8XD	Score: 21–10, 17–21, 21–19	
June 21	Morocco International: Host: Casablanca, Morocco; Level: International Series; Format: 32MS/8WS/16MD/4WD/8XD	(Egypt) Abdelrahman Kashkal (Egypt) Alaa Fatty	(Croatia) Luka Zdenjak (Morocco) Rajae Rochdy
June 21	Morocco International: Host: Casablanca, Morocco; Level: International Series; Format: 32MS/8WS/16MD/4WD/8XD	Score: 21–18, 19–21, 21–15	
June 28	(Russia) Russian Open: Host: Vladivostok, Russia; Level: Grand Prix; Format: 64MS/32WS/32MD/32WD/32XD	(Japan) Takuma Ueda	(Russia) Stanislav Pukhov
June 28	(Russia) Russian Open: Host: Vladivostok, Russia; Level: Grand Prix; Format: 64MS/32WS/32MD/32WD/32XD	Score: 21–17, 21–17	
June 28	(Russia) Russian Open: Host: Vladivostok, Russia; Level: Grand Prix; Format: 64MS/32WS/32MD/32WD/32XD	(Japan) Ayane Kurihara	(Russia) Ella Diehl
June 28	(Russia) Russian Open: Host: Vladivostok, Russia; Level: Grand Prix; Format: 64MS/32WS/32MD/32WD/32XD	Score: 21–19, 21–19	
June 28	(Russia) Russian Open: Host: Vladivostok, Russia; Level: Grand Prix; Format: 64MS/32WS/32MD/32WD/32XD	(Russia) Vladimir Ivanov (Russia) Ivan Sozonov	(Russia) Vitalij Durkin (Russia) Aleksandr Nikolaenko
June 28	(Russia) Russian Open: Host: Vladivostok, Russia; Level: Grand Prix; Format: 64MS/32WS/32MD/32WD/32XD	Score: 21–17, 10–21, 21–18	
June 28	(Russia) Russian Open: Host: Vladivostok, Russia; Level: Grand Prix; Format: 64MS/32WS/32MD/32WD/32XD	(Russia) Valeria Sorokina (Russia) Nina Vislova	(Japan) Yuriko Miki (Japan) Koharu Yonemoto
June 28	(Russia) Russian Open: Host: Vladivostok, Russia; Level: Grand Prix; Format: 64MS/32WS/32MD/32WD/32XD	Score: 21–18, 21–18	
June 28	(Russia) Russian Open: Host: Vladivostok, Russia; Level: Grand Prix; Format: 64MS/32WS/32MD/32WD/32XD	(Russia) Aleksandr Nikolaenko (Russia) Valeria Sorokina	(Russia) Vitalij Durkin (Russia) Nina Vislova
June 28	(Russia) Russian Open: Host: Vladivostok, Russia; Level: Grand Prix; Format: 64MS/32WS/32MD/32WD/32XD	Score: 8–21, 21–14, 21–16	

=== July ===
Week of	Tournament	Champions	Runners-up
July 5	Malaysia Open Grand Prix Gold: Host: Johor Bahru, Malaysia; Level: Grand Prix Gold; Format: 64MS/32WS/32MD/32WD/32XD	(Malaysia) Lee Chong Wei	(Malaysia) Wong Choong Hann
July 5	Malaysia Open Grand Prix Gold: Host: Johor Bahru, Malaysia; Level: Grand Prix Gold; Format: 64MS/32WS/32MD/32WD/32XD	Score: 21–8, 14–21, 21–15	
July 5	Malaysia Open Grand Prix Gold: Host: Johor Bahru, Malaysia; Level: Grand Prix Gold; Format: 64MS/32WS/32MD/32WD/32XD	(Hong Kong) Yip Pui Yin	(Hong Kong) Zhou Mi
July 5	Malaysia Open Grand Prix Gold: Host: Johor Bahru, Malaysia; Level: Grand Prix Gold; Format: 64MS/32WS/32MD/32WD/32XD	Score: 21–16, 14–21, 21–19	
July 5	Malaysia Open Grand Prix Gold: Host: Johor Bahru, Malaysia; Level: Grand Prix Gold; Format: 64MS/32WS/32MD/32WD/32XD	(Indonesia) Hendra Setiawan (Indonesia) Markis Kido	(Indonesia) Hendra Aprida Gunawan (Indonesia) Alvent Yulianto
July 5	Malaysia Open Grand Prix Gold: Host: Johor Bahru, Malaysia; Level: Grand Prix Gold; Format: 64MS/32WS/32MD/32WD/32XD	Score: 8–21, 21–17, 21–12	
July 5	Malaysia Open Grand Prix Gold: Host: Johor Bahru, Malaysia; Level: Grand Prix Gold; Format: 64MS/32WS/32MD/32WD/32XD	(Thailand) Duanganong Aroonkesorn (Thailand) Kunchala Voravichitchaikul	(Malaysia) Ng Hui Ern (Malaysia) Ng Hui Lin
July 5	Malaysia Open Grand Prix Gold: Host: Johor Bahru, Malaysia; Level: Grand Prix Gold; Format: 64MS/32WS/32MD/32WD/32XD	Score: 12–21, 21–17, 21–13	
July 5	Malaysia Open Grand Prix Gold: Host: Johor Bahru, Malaysia; Level: Grand Prix Gold; Format: 64MS/32WS/32MD/32WD/32XD	(Indonesia) Devin Lahardi Fitriawan (Indonesia) Liliyana Natsir	(Thailand) Sudket Prapakamol (Thailand) Saralee Thungthongkam
July 5	Malaysia Open Grand Prix Gold: Host: Johor Bahru, Malaysia; Level: Grand Prix Gold; Format: 64MS/32WS/32MD/32WD/32XD	Score: 13–21, 21–16, 21–17	
July 5	White Nights: Host: Gatchina, Russia; Level: International Challenge; Format: 64MS/32WS/32MD/32WD/32XD	(Russia) Ivan Sozonov	(Poland) Przemysław Wacha
July 5	White Nights: Host: Gatchina, Russia; Level: International Challenge; Format: 64MS/32WS/32MD/32WD/32XD	Score: 22–20, 21–14	
July 5	White Nights: Host: Gatchina, Russia; Level: International Challenge; Format: 64MS/32WS/32MD/32WD/32XD	(Russia) Tatjana Bibik	(Russia) Anastasia Prokopenko
July 5	White Nights: Host: Gatchina, Russia; Level: International Challenge; Format: 64MS/32WS/32MD/32WD/32XD	Score: 11–21, 21–8, 21–17	
July 5	White Nights: Host: Gatchina, Russia; Level: International Challenge; Format: 64MS/32WS/32MD/32WD/32XD	(Poland) Adam Cwalina (Poland) Michał Łogosz	(Russia) Vitalij Durkin (Russia) Aleksandr Nikolaenko
July 5	White Nights: Host: Gatchina, Russia; Level: International Challenge; Format: 64MS/32WS/32MD/32WD/32XD	Score: 21–19, 29–27	
July 5	White Nights: Host: Gatchina, Russia; Level: International Challenge; Format: 64MS/32WS/32MD/32WD/32XD	(Russia) Valeria Sorokina (Russia) Nina Vislova	(Bulgaria) Petya Nedelcheva (Russia) Anastasia Russkikh
July 5	White Nights: Host: Gatchina, Russia; Level: International Challenge; Format: 64MS/32WS/32MD/32WD/32XD	Score: 21–17, 21–15	
July 5	White Nights: Host: Gatchina, Russia; Level: International Challenge; Format: 64MS/32WS/32MD/32WD/32XD	(Russia) Evgenij Dremin (Russia) Anastasia Russkikh	(Ukraine) Valeriy Atrashchenkov (Ukraine) Elena Prus
July 5	White Nights: Host: Gatchina, Russia; Level: International Challenge; Format: 64MS/32WS/32MD/32WD/32XD	Score: 21–17, 21–14	
July 12	Canada Open: Host: Richmond, British Columbia, Canada; Level: Grand Prix; Format: 64MS/32WS/32MD/32WD/32XD	(Indonesia) Taufik Hidayat	(France) Brice Leverdez
July 12	Canada Open: Host: Richmond, British Columbia, Canada; Level: Grand Prix; Format: 64MS/32WS/32MD/32WD/32XD	Score: 21–15, 21–11	
July 12	Canada Open: Host: Richmond, British Columbia, Canada; Level: Grand Prix; Format: 64MS/32WS/32MD/32WD/32XD	(China) Zhu Lin	(Germany) Juliane Schenk
July 12	Canada Open: Host: Richmond, British Columbia, Canada; Level: Grand Prix; Format: 64MS/32WS/32MD/32WD/32XD	Score: 21–19, 17–21, 21–10	
July 12	Canada Open: Host: Richmond, British Columbia, Canada; Level: Grand Prix; Format: 64MS/32WS/32MD/32WD/32XD	(Chinese Taipei) Fang Chieh-min (Chinese Taipei) Lee Sheng-mu	(Singapore) Hendri Saputra (Singapore) Chayut Triyachart
July 12	Canada Open: Host: Richmond, British Columbia, Canada; Level: Grand Prix; Format: 64MS/32WS/32MD/32WD/32XD	Score: 21–16, 21–16	
July 12	Canada Open: Host: Richmond, British Columbia, Canada; Level: Grand Prix; Format: 64MS/32WS/32MD/32WD/32XD	(Chinese Taipei) Cheng Wen-hsing (Chinese Taipei) Chien Yu-chin	(Germany) Sandra Marinello (Germany) Birgit Overzier
July 12	Canada Open: Host: Richmond, British Columbia, Canada; Level: Grand Prix; Format: 64MS/32WS/32MD/32WD/32XD	Score: 21–16, 18–21, 21–17	
July 12	Canada Open: Host: Richmond, British Columbia, Canada; Level: Grand Prix; Format: 64MS/32WS/32MD/32WD/32XD	(Chinese Taipei) Lee Sheng-mu (Chinese Taipei) Chien Yu-chin	(Chinese Taipei) Chen Hung-ling (Chinese Taipei) Cheng Wen-hsing
July 12	Canada Open: Host: Richmond, British Columbia, Canada; Level: Grand Prix; Format: 64MS/32WS/32MD/32WD/32XD	Score: 21–16, 11–21, 21–15	
July 12	Australian Open: Host: Melbourne, Australia; Level: Grand Prix; Format: 64MS/32WS/32MD/32WD/32XD	(Vietnam) Nguyễn Tiến Minh	(Malaysia) Yogendran Khrishnan
July 12	Australian Open: Host: Melbourne, Australia; Level: Grand Prix; Format: 64MS/32WS/32MD/32WD/32XD	Score: 21–14, 21–11	
July 12	Australian Open: Host: Melbourne, Australia; Level: Grand Prix; Format: 64MS/32WS/32MD/32WD/32XD	(South Korea) Seo Yoon-hee	(Japan) Minatsu Mitani
July 12	Australian Open: Host: Melbourne, Australia; Level: Grand Prix; Format: 64MS/32WS/32MD/32WD/32XD	Score: 22–20, 14–21, 21–19	
July 12	Australian Open: Host: Melbourne, Australia; Level: Grand Prix; Format: 64MS/32WS/32MD/32WD/32XD	(Japan) Hiroyuki Endo (Japan) Kenichi Hayakawa	(South Korea) Kang Woo-kyum (South Korea) Park Tae-sang
July 12	Australian Open: Host: Melbourne, Australia; Level: Grand Prix; Format: 64MS/32WS/32MD/32WD/32XD	Score: 21–15, 21–16	
July 12	Australian Open: Host: Melbourne, Australia; Level: Grand Prix; Format: 64MS/32WS/32MD/32WD/32XD	(South Korea) Kim Min-seo (South Korea) Lee Kyung-won	(South Korea) Kang Hae-won (South Korea) Seo Yoon-hee
July 12	Australian Open: Host: Melbourne, Australia; Level: Grand Prix; Format: 64MS/32WS/32MD/32WD/32XD	Score: 21–17, 21–17	
July 12	Australian Open: Host: Melbourne, Australia; Level: Grand Prix; Format: 64MS/32WS/32MD/32WD/32XD	(South Korea) Cho Gun-woo (South Korea) Kim Min-seo	(Japan) Hajime Komiyama (Japan) Sayuri Asahara
July 12	Australian Open: Host: Melbourne, Australia; Level: Grand Prix; Format: 64MS/32WS/32MD/32WD/32XD	Score: 21–14, 21–10	
July 19	U.S. Open: Host: Orange, California, United States; Level: Grand Prix Gold; Format: 64MS/32WS/32MD/32WD/32XD	(England) Rajiv Ouseph	(France) Brice Leverdez
July 19	U.S. Open: Host: Orange, California, United States; Level: Grand Prix Gold; Format: 64MS/32WS/32MD/32WD/32XD	Score: 21-17, 21-9	
July 19	U.S. Open: Host: Orange, California, United States; Level: Grand Prix Gold; Format: 64MS/32WS/32MD/32WD/32XD	(China) Zhu Lin	(Netherlands) Judith Meulendijks
July 19	U.S. Open: Host: Orange, California, United States; Level: Grand Prix Gold; Format: 64MS/32WS/32MD/32WD/32XD	Score: 21–19, 11–6 retired	
July 19	U.S. Open: Host: Orange, California, United States; Level: Grand Prix Gold; Format: 64MS/32WS/32MD/32WD/32XD	(Chinese Taipei) Fang Chieh-min (Chinese Taipei) Lee Sheng-mu	(Chinese Taipei) Chen Hung-ling (Chinese Taipei) Lin Yu-lang
July 19	U.S. Open: Host: Orange, California, United States; Level: Grand Prix Gold; Format: 64MS/32WS/32MD/32WD/32XD	Score: 21–19, 21–14	
July 19	U.S. Open: Host: Orange, California, United States; Level: Grand Prix Gold; Format: 64MS/32WS/32MD/32WD/32XD	(Chinese Taipei) Cheng Wen-hsing (Chinese Taipei) Chien Yu-chin	(Japan) Rie Eto (Japan) Yu Wakita
July 19	U.S. Open: Host: Orange, California, United States; Level: Grand Prix Gold; Format: 64MS/32WS/32MD/32WD/32XD	Score: 21–8, 22–20	
July 19	U.S. Open: Host: Orange, California, United States; Level: Grand Prix Gold; Format: 64MS/32WS/32MD/32WD/32XD	(Germany) Michael Fuchs (Germany) Birgit Overzier	(Chinese Taipei) Lee Sheng-mu (Chinese Taipei) Chien Yu-chin
July 19	U.S. Open: Host: Orange, California, United States; Level: Grand Prix Gold; Format: 64MS/32WS/32MD/32WD/32XD	Score: 21–19, 21–14	
July 19	Singapore International: Host: Singapore; Level: International Series; Format: 64MS/32WS/32MD/32WD/32XD	(South Korea) Hong Seung-ki	(South Korea) Shon Seung-mo
July 19	Singapore International: Host: Singapore; Level: International Series; Format: 64MS/32WS/32MD/32WD/32XD	Score: 21–17, 21–12	
July 19	Singapore International: Host: Singapore; Level: International Series; Format: 64MS/32WS/32MD/32WD/32XD	(Singapore) Chen Jiayuan	(South Korea) Kwon Hee-sook
July 19	Singapore International: Host: Singapore; Level: International Series; Format: 64MS/32WS/32MD/32WD/32XD	Score: 18–21, 21–16, 21–14	
July 19	Singapore International: Host: Singapore; Level: International Series; Format: 64MS/32WS/32MD/32WD/32XD	(Indonesia) Albert Saputra (Indonesia) Rizki Yanu Kresnayandi	(Indonesia) Agripina Prima Rahmanto Putra (Indonesia) Ricky Karanda Suwardi
July 19	Singapore International: Host: Singapore; Level: International Series; Format: 64MS/32WS/32MD/32WD/32XD	Score: 19–21, 21–12, 21–15	
July 19	Singapore International: Host: Singapore; Level: International Series; Format: 64MS/32WS/32MD/32WD/32XD	(South Korea) Yim Jae-eun (South Korea) Lee Se-rang	(Indonesia) Jenna Gozali (Indonesia) Aprilsasi Putri Lejarsar Variella
July 19	Singapore International: Host: Singapore; Level: International Series; Format: 64MS/32WS/32MD/32WD/32XD	Score: 21–19, 21–12	
July 19	Singapore International: Host: Singapore; Level: International Series; Format: 64MS/32WS/32MD/32WD/32XD	(Hong Kong) Yohan Hadikusumo Wiratama (Hong Kong) Tse Ying Suet	(South Korea) Lee Jae-jin (South Korea) Yim Jae-eun
July 19	Singapore International: Host: Singapore; Level: International Series; Format: 64MS/32WS/32MD/32WD/32XD	Score: 21–13, 21–19	
July 26	Indonesia International: Host: Surabaya, Indonesia; Level: International Challenge; Format: 128MS/128WS/128MD/32WD/64XD	(Indonesia) Alamsyah Yunus	(Indonesia) Andre Kurniawan Tedjono
July 26	Indonesia International: Host: Surabaya, Indonesia; Level: International Challenge; Format: 128MS/128WS/128MD/32WD/64XD	Score: 21–18, 21–10	
July 26	Indonesia International: Host: Surabaya, Indonesia; Level: International Challenge; Format: 128MS/128WS/128MD/32WD/64XD	(Indonesia) Rosaria Yusfin Pungkasari	(Indonesia) Bellaetrix Manuputty
July 26	Indonesia International: Host: Surabaya, Indonesia; Level: International Challenge; Format: 128MS/128WS/128MD/32WD/64XD	Score: 22–24, 21–15, 21–18	
July 26	Indonesia International: Host: Surabaya, Indonesia; Level: International Challenge; Format: 128MS/128WS/128MD/32WD/64XD	(Indonesia) Muhammad Ulinnuha (Indonesia) Berry Angriawan	(Indonesia) Rahmat Adianto (Indonesia) Andrei Adistia
July 26	Indonesia International: Host: Surabaya, Indonesia; Level: International Challenge; Format: 128MS/128WS/128MD/32WD/64XD	Score: 21–14, 21–15	
July 26	Indonesia International: Host: Surabaya, Indonesia; Level: International Challenge; Format: 128MS/128WS/128MD/32WD/64XD	(Indonesia) Della Destiara Haris (Indonesia) Suci Rizky Andini	(Indonesia) Komala Dewi (Indonesia) Keshya Nurvita Hanadia
July 26	Indonesia International: Host: Surabaya, Indonesia; Level: International Challenge; Format: 128MS/128WS/128MD/32WD/64XD	Score: 21–18, 12–21, 21–10	
July 26	Indonesia International: Host: Surabaya, Indonesia; Level: International Challenge; Format: 128MS/128WS/128MD/32WD/64XD	(Indonesia) Hendra Mulyono (Indonesia) Ayu Rahmasari	(Indonesia) Trikusuma Wardhana (Indonesia) Nadia Melati
July 26	Indonesia International: Host: Surabaya, Indonesia; Level: International Challenge; Format: 128MS/128WS/128MD/32WD/64XD	Score: 21–18, 14–21, 21–18	
July 26	Macau Open: Host: Taipa, Macau; Level: Grand Prix Gold; Format: 64MS/32WS/32MD/32WD/32XD	(Malaysia) Lee Chong Wei	(South Korea) Lee Hyun-il
July 26	Macau Open: Host: Taipa, Macau; Level: Grand Prix Gold; Format: 64MS/32WS/32MD/32WD/32XD	Score: No match	
July 26	Macau Open: Host: Taipa, Macau; Level: Grand Prix Gold; Format: 64MS/32WS/32MD/32WD/32XD	(China) Li Xuerui	(Indonesia) Adriyanti Firdasari
July 26	Macau Open: Host: Taipa, Macau; Level: Grand Prix Gold; Format: 64MS/32WS/32MD/32WD/32XD	Score: 21–18, 21–15	
July 26	Macau Open: Host: Taipa, Macau; Level: Grand Prix Gold; Format: 64MS/32WS/32MD/32WD/32XD	(South Korea) Ko Sung-hyun (South Korea) Yoo Yeon-seong	(Indonesia) Hendra Aprida Gunawan (Indonesia) Alvent Yulianto
July 26	Macau Open: Host: Taipa, Macau; Level: Grand Prix Gold; Format: 64MS/32WS/32MD/32WD/32XD	Score: 21–17, 21–15	
July 26	Macau Open: Host: Taipa, Macau; Level: Grand Prix Gold; Format: 64MS/32WS/32MD/32WD/32XD	(Chinese Taipei) Cheng Wen-hsing (Chinese Taipei) Chien Yu-chin	(Indonesia) Greysia Polii (Indonesia) Meiliana Jauhari
July 26	Macau Open: Host: Taipa, Macau; Level: Grand Prix Gold; Format: 64MS/32WS/32MD/32WD/32XD	Score: 16–21, 21–18, 21–16	
July 26	Macau Open: Host: Taipa, Macau; Level: Grand Prix Gold; Format: 64MS/32WS/32MD/32WD/32XD	(Indonesia) Tontowi Ahmad (Indonesia) Liliyana Natsir	(Indonesia) Hendra Aprida Gunawan (Indonesia) Vita Marissa
July 26	Macau Open: Host: Taipa, Macau; Level: Grand Prix Gold; Format: 64MS/32WS/32MD/32WD/32XD	Score: 21–14, 21–18	

=== August ===
Week of	Tournament	Champions	Runners-up
August 2	Chinese Taipei Open: Host: Taipei, Chinese Taipei; Level: Grand Prix Gold; Format: 64MS/32WS/32MD/32WD/32XD	(Indonesia) Simon Santoso	(South Korea) Son Wan-ho
August 2	Chinese Taipei Open: Host: Taipei, Chinese Taipei; Level: Grand Prix Gold; Format: 64MS/32WS/32MD/32WD/32XD	Score: 21-14, 21-11	
August 2	Chinese Taipei Open: Host: Taipei, Chinese Taipei; Level: Grand Prix Gold; Format: 64MS/32WS/32MD/32WD/32XD	(Chinese Taipei) Cheng Shao-chieh	(South Korea) Bae Seung-hee
August 2	Chinese Taipei Open: Host: Taipei, Chinese Taipei; Level: Grand Prix Gold; Format: 64MS/32WS/32MD/32WD/32XD	Score: 21-11, 24-26, 21-17	
August 2	Chinese Taipei Open: Host: Taipei, Chinese Taipei; Level: Grand Prix Gold; Format: 64MS/32WS/32MD/32WD/32XD	(South Korea) Jung Jae-sung (South Korea) Lee Yong-dae	(South Korea) Cho Gun-woo (South Korea) Kwon Yi-goo
August 2	Chinese Taipei Open: Host: Taipei, Chinese Taipei; Level: Grand Prix Gold; Format: 64MS/32WS/32MD/32WD/32XD	Score: 21-10, 21-16	
August 2	Chinese Taipei Open: Host: Taipei, Chinese Taipei; Level: Grand Prix Gold; Format: 64MS/32WS/32MD/32WD/32XD	(South Korea) Kim Min-jung (South Korea) Lee Hyo-jung	(South Korea) Yoo Hyun-young (South Korea) Lee Kyung-won
August 2	Chinese Taipei Open: Host: Taipei, Chinese Taipei; Level: Grand Prix Gold; Format: 64MS/32WS/32MD/32WD/32XD	Score: 21-14, 22-20	
August 2	Chinese Taipei Open: Host: Taipei, Chinese Taipei; Level: Grand Prix Gold; Format: 64MS/32WS/32MD/32WD/32XD	(Indonesia) Hendra Aprida Gunawan (Indonesia) Vita Marissa	(Indonesia) Tontowi Ahmad (Indonesia) Liliyana Natsir
August 2	Chinese Taipei Open: Host: Taipei, Chinese Taipei; Level: Grand Prix Gold; Format: 64MS/32WS/32MD/32WD/32XD	Score: 22-20, 14-21, 22-20	
August 2	Syria International: Host: Damascus, Syria; Level: International Series; Format: 128MS/64WS/64MD/16WD/64XD	(Bahrain) Heri Setiawan	(Iran) Ali Shahhosseini
August 2	Syria International: Host: Damascus, Syria; Level: International Series; Format: 128MS/64WS/64MD/16WD/64XD	Score: 21-14, 21-19	
August 2	Syria International: Host: Damascus, Syria; Level: International Series; Format: 128MS/64WS/64MD/16WD/64XD	(Turkey) Özge Bayrak	(Philippines) Malvinne Alcala
August 2	Syria International: Host: Damascus, Syria; Level: International Series; Format: 128MS/64WS/64MD/16WD/64XD	Score: 21-18, 21-16	
August 2	Syria International: Host: Damascus, Syria; Level: International Series; Format: 128MS/64WS/64MD/16WD/64XD	(Pakistan) Sulehri Kashif Ali (Pakistan) Rizwan Azam	(Bahrain) Heri Setiawan (Bahrain) Ebrahim Jafar Al Sayed Jafar
August 2	Syria International: Host: Damascus, Syria; Level: International Series; Format: 128MS/64WS/64MD/16WD/64XD	Score: 21-18, 21-18	
August 2	Syria International: Host: Damascus, Syria; Level: International Series; Format: 128MS/64WS/64MD/16WD/64XD	(Turkey) Cemre Fere (Turkey) Özge Bayrak	(Turkey) Neslihan Kılıç (Turkey) Neslihan Yiğit
August 2	Syria International: Host: Damascus, Syria; Level: International Series; Format: 128MS/64WS/64MD/16WD/64XD	Score: 21-18, 13-21, 22-20	
August 2	Syria International: Host: Damascus, Syria; Level: International Series; Format: 128MS/64WS/64MD/16WD/64XD	(Sri Lanka) Lasitha Karunathilake (Sri Lanka) Renu Hettiarachchige	(Turkey) Emre Vural (Turkey) Özge Bayrak
August 2	Syria International: Host: Damascus, Syria; Level: International Series; Format: 128MS/64WS/64MD/16WD/64XD	Score: 21-17, 21-19	
August 16	(Singapore) Youth Olympic Games (Draw): Host: Singapore; Level: Multi-sport event; Format: 32MS/32WS	(Thailand) Pisit Poodchalat	(India) Prannoy Kumar
August 16	(Singapore) Youth Olympic Games (Draw): Host: Singapore; Level: Multi-sport event; Format: 32MS/32WS	Score: 21-15, 21-16	
August 16	(Singapore) Youth Olympic Games (Draw): Host: Singapore; Level: Multi-sport event; Format: 32MS/32WS	(Thailand) Sapsiree Taerattanachai	(China) Deng Xuan
August 16	(Singapore) Youth Olympic Games (Draw): Host: Singapore; Level: Multi-sport event; Format: 32MS/32WS	Score: 21-14, 21-17	
August 23	(France) World Championships (Draw): Host: Paris, France; Level: BWF Major Event; Format: 64MS/64WS/64MD/64WD/64XD	(China) Chen Jin	(Indonesia) Taufik Hidayat
August 23	(France) World Championships (Draw): Host: Paris, France; Level: BWF Major Event; Format: 64MS/64WS/64MD/64WD/64XD	Score: 21-13, 21-15	
August 23	(France) World Championships (Draw): Host: Paris, France; Level: BWF Major Event; Format: 64MS/64WS/64MD/64WD/64XD	(China) Wang Lin	(China) Wang Xin
August 23	(France) World Championships (Draw): Host: Paris, France; Level: BWF Major Event; Format: 64MS/64WS/64MD/64WD/64XD	Score: 21-11, 19-21, 21-13	
August 23	(France) World Championships (Draw): Host: Paris, France; Level: BWF Major Event; Format: 64MS/64WS/64MD/64WD/64XD	(China) Cai Yun (China) Fu Haifeng	(Malaysia) Koo Kien Keat (Malaysia) Tan Boon Heong
August 23	(France) World Championships (Draw): Host: Paris, France; Level: BWF Major Event; Format: 64MS/64WS/64MD/64WD/64XD	Score: 18-21, 21-18, 21-14	
August 23	(France) World Championships (Draw): Host: Paris, France; Level: BWF Major Event; Format: 64MS/64WS/64MD/64WD/64XD	(China) Du Jing (China) Yu Yang	(China) Ma Jin (China) Wang Xiaoli
August 23	(France) World Championships (Draw): Host: Paris, France; Level: BWF Major Event; Format: 64MS/64WS/64MD/64WD/64XD	Score: 21-9, 21-17	
August 23	(France) World Championships (Draw): Host: Paris, France; Level: BWF Major Event; Format: 64MS/64WS/64MD/64WD/64XD	(China) Zheng Bo (China) Ma Jin	(China) He Hanbin (China) Yu Yang
August 23	(France) World Championships (Draw): Host: Paris, France; Level: BWF Major Event; Format: 64MS/64WS/64MD/64WD/64XD	Score: 21-14, 21-10	
August 23	Fiji International: Host: Suva, Fiji; Level: Future Series; Format: 32MS/8WS/16MD/8WD/16XD	(Italy) Rosario Maddaloni	(New Zealand) Bjorn Seguin
August 23	Fiji International: Host: Suva, Fiji; Level: Future Series; Format: 32MS/8WS/16MD/8WD/16XD	Score: 18-21, 21-19, 21-19	
August 23	Fiji International: Host: Suva, Fiji; Level: Future Series; Format: 32MS/8WS/16MD/8WD/16XD	(Italy) Agnese Allegrini	(New Caledonia) Johanna Kou
August 23	Fiji International: Host: Suva, Fiji; Level: Future Series; Format: 32MS/8WS/16MD/8WD/16XD	Score: 21-3, 21-4	
August 23	Fiji International: Host: Suva, Fiji; Level: Future Series; Format: 32MS/8WS/16MD/8WD/16XD	(Italy) Rosario Maddaloni (Italy) Giovanni Traina	(New Caledonia) Arnaud Franzi (New Caledonia) Fabien Kaddour
August 23	Fiji International: Host: Suva, Fiji; Level: Future Series; Format: 32MS/8WS/16MD/8WD/16XD	Score: 21-13, 21-18	
August 23	Fiji International: Host: Suva, Fiji; Level: Future Series; Format: 32MS/8WS/16MD/8WD/16XD	(Fiji) Andra Whiteside (Fiji) Danielle Whiteside	(Fiji) Carline Bentley (Fiji) Gabriella Wong
August 23	Fiji International: Host: Suva, Fiji; Level: Future Series; Format: 32MS/8WS/16MD/8WD/16XD	Score: 21-10, 21-15	
August 23	Fiji International: Host: Suva, Fiji; Level: Future Series; Format: 32MS/8WS/16MD/8WD/16XD	(New Caledonia) Arnaud Franzi (New Caledonia) Johanna Kou	(New Caledonia) William Jannic (New Caledonia) Cecile Kaddour
August 23	Fiji International: Host: Suva, Fiji; Level: Future Series; Format: 32MS/8WS/16MD/8WD/16XD	Score: 26-24, 21-18	
August 30	(Germany) Bitburger Open: Host: Saarbrücken, Germany; Level: Grand Prix Gold; Format: 64MS/32WS/32MD/32WD/32XD	(China) Chen Long	(Denmark) Hans-Kristian Vittinghus
August 30	(Germany) Bitburger Open: Host: Saarbrücken, Germany; Level: Grand Prix Gold; Format: 64MS/32WS/32MD/32WD/32XD	Score: 21-3, 12-21, 21-9	
August 30	(Germany) Bitburger Open: Host: Saarbrücken, Germany; Level: Grand Prix Gold; Format: 64MS/32WS/32MD/32WD/32XD	(China) Liu Xin	(Macau) Wang Rong
August 30	(Germany) Bitburger Open: Host: Saarbrücken, Germany; Level: Grand Prix Gold; Format: 64MS/32WS/32MD/32WD/32XD	Score: 21-16, 21-10	
August 30	(Germany) Bitburger Open: Host: Saarbrücken, Germany; Level: Grand Prix Gold; Format: 64MS/32WS/32MD/32WD/32XD	(Denmark) Mathias Boe (Denmark) Carsten Mogensen	(Germany) Ingo Kindervater (Germany) Johannes Schöttler
August 30	(Germany) Bitburger Open: Host: Saarbrücken, Germany; Level: Grand Prix Gold; Format: 64MS/32WS/32MD/32WD/32XD	Score: 21-16, 21-16	
August 30	(Germany) Bitburger Open: Host: Saarbrücken, Germany; Level: Grand Prix Gold; Format: 64MS/32WS/32MD/32WD/32XD	(China) Pan Pan (China) Tian Qing	(Netherlands) Lotte Jonathans (Netherlands) Pauline van Dooremalen
August 30	(Germany) Bitburger Open: Host: Saarbrücken, Germany; Level: Grand Prix Gold; Format: 64MS/32WS/32MD/32WD/32XD	Score: 21-7, 21-10	
August 30	(Germany) Bitburger Open: Host: Saarbrücken, Germany; Level: Grand Prix Gold; Format: 64MS/32WS/32MD/32WD/32XD	(China) Zhang Nan (China) Zhao Yunlei	(Germany) Michael Fuchs (Germany) Birgit Overzier
August 30	(Germany) Bitburger Open: Host: Saarbrücken, Germany; Level: Grand Prix Gold; Format: 64MS/32WS/32MD/32WD/32XD	Score: 22-20, 21-9	

=== September ===
Week of	Tournament	Champions	Runners-up
September 1	(French Polynesia) Tahiti International: Host: Papeete, Tahiti; Level: International Series; Format: 32MS/16WS/16MD/8WD/32XD	(Scotland) Alistair Casey	(Italy) Rosario Maddaloni
September 1	(French Polynesia) Tahiti International: Host: Papeete, Tahiti; Level: International Series; Format: 32MS/16WS/16MD/8WD/32XD	Score: 21-17, 21-18	
September 1	(French Polynesia) Tahiti International: Host: Papeete, Tahiti; Level: International Series; Format: 32MS/16WS/16MD/8WD/32XD	(United States) Cee Nantana Ketpura	(Italy) Agnese Allegrini
September 1	(French Polynesia) Tahiti International: Host: Papeete, Tahiti; Level: International Series; Format: 32MS/16WS/16MD/8WD/32XD	Score: 21-16, 21-18	
September 1	(French Polynesia) Tahiti International: Host: Papeete, Tahiti; Level: International Series; Format: 32MS/16WS/16MD/8WD/32XD	(Australia) Ross Smith (Australia) Glenn Warfe	(New Zealand) Maoni Hu He (New Zealand) Oliver Leydon-Davis
September 1	(French Polynesia) Tahiti International: Host: Papeete, Tahiti; Level: International Series; Format: 32MS/16WS/16MD/8WD/32XD	Score: 21-11, 21-12	
September 1	(French Polynesia) Tahiti International: Host: Papeete, Tahiti; Level: International Series; Format: 32MS/16WS/16MD/8WD/32XD	(Australia) Leanne Choo (Australia) Kate Wilson-Smith	(Germany) Nicole Grether (Canada) Charmaine Reid
September 1	(French Polynesia) Tahiti International: Host: Papeete, Tahiti; Level: International Series; Format: 32MS/16WS/16MD/8WD/32XD	Score: 21-12, 19-21, 21-12	
September 1	(French Polynesia) Tahiti International: Host: Papeete, Tahiti; Level: International Series; Format: 32MS/16WS/16MD/8WD/32XD	(Australia) Ross Smith (Australia) Kate Wilson-Smith	(Australia) Glenn Warfe (Australia) Leanne Choo
September 1	(French Polynesia) Tahiti International: Host: Papeete, Tahiti; Level: International Series; Format: 32MS/16WS/16MD/8WD/32XD	Score: 21-14, 13-21, 21-18	
September 6	Guatemala International: Host: Guatemala City, Guatemala; Level: International Challenge; Format: 64MS/64WS/32MD/32WD/32XD	(Guatemala) Kevin Cordon	(Guatemala) Rodolfo Ramirez
September 6	Guatemala International: Host: Guatemala City, Guatemala; Level: International Challenge; Format: 64MS/64WS/32MD/32WD/32XD	Score: 21-14, 21-16	
September 6	Guatemala International: Host: Guatemala City, Guatemala; Level: International Challenge; Format: 64MS/64WS/32MD/32WD/32XD	(Germany) Nicole Grether	(United States) Rena Wang
September 6	Guatemala International: Host: Guatemala City, Guatemala; Level: International Challenge; Format: 64MS/64WS/32MD/32WD/32XD	Score: 21-12, 21-13	
September 6	Guatemala International: Host: Guatemala City, Guatemala; Level: International Challenge; Format: 64MS/64WS/32MD/32WD/32XD	(Canada) Adrian Liu (Canada) Derrick Ng	(Guatemala) Kevin Cordon (Guatemala) Rodolfo Ramirez
September 6	Guatemala International: Host: Guatemala City, Guatemala; Level: International Challenge; Format: 64MS/64WS/32MD/32WD/32XD	Score: 23-21, 22-20	
September 6	Guatemala International: Host: Guatemala City, Guatemala; Level: International Challenge; Format: 64MS/64WS/32MD/32WD/32XD	(Germany) Nicole Grether (Canada) Charmaine Reid	(Peru) Christina Aicardi (Peru) Claudia Rivero
September 6	Guatemala International: Host: Guatemala City, Guatemala; Level: International Challenge; Format: 64MS/64WS/32MD/32WD/32XD	Score: 21-4, 21-8	
September 6	Guatemala International: Host: Guatemala City, Guatemala; Level: International Challenge; Format: 64MS/64WS/32MD/32WD/32XD	(Canada) Toby Ng (Canada) Grace Gao	(United States) Phillip Chew (United States) Cee Nantana Ketpura
September 6	Guatemala International: Host: Guatemala City, Guatemala; Level: International Challenge; Format: 64MS/64WS/32MD/32WD/32XD	Score: 21-11, 21-12	
September 6	(New Caledonia) Nouméa International: Host: Nouméa, New Caledonia; Level: Future Series; Format: 32MS/16WS/16MD/4WD/16XD	(New Zealand) Bjorn Seguin	(Italy) Rosario Maddaloni
September 6	(New Caledonia) Nouméa International: Host: Nouméa, New Caledonia; Level: Future Series; Format: 32MS/16WS/16MD/4WD/16XD	Score: 21-14, 21-8	
September 6	(New Caledonia) Nouméa International: Host: Nouméa, New Caledonia; Level: Future Series; Format: 32MS/16WS/16MD/4WD/16XD	(Italy) Agnese Allegrini	(Mexico) Deyanira Angulo
September 6	(New Caledonia) Nouméa International: Host: Nouméa, New Caledonia; Level: Future Series; Format: 32MS/16WS/16MD/4WD/16XD	Score: 21-6, 21-10	
September 6	(New Caledonia) Nouméa International: Host: Nouméa, New Caledonia; Level: Future Series; Format: 32MS/16WS/16MD/4WD/16XD	(Australia) Luke Chong (Australia) Hoe Keat Oon	(New Caledonia) Sebastien Arias (New Zealand) Bjorn Seguin
September 6	(New Caledonia) Nouméa International: Host: Nouméa, New Caledonia; Level: Future Series; Format: 32MS/16WS/16MD/4WD/16XD	Score: 21-14, 21-12	
September 6	(New Caledonia) Nouméa International: Host: Nouméa, New Caledonia; Level: Future Series; Format: 32MS/16WS/16MD/4WD/16XD	(New Caledonia) Cecile Kaddour (New Caledonia) Johanna Kou	(New Caledonia) Cathy Camerota (New Caledonia) Melissa Sanmoestanom
September 6	(New Caledonia) Nouméa International: Host: Nouméa, New Caledonia; Level: Future Series; Format: 32MS/16WS/16MD/4WD/16XD	Score: 22-20, 21-16	
September 6	(New Caledonia) Nouméa International: Host: Nouméa, New Caledonia; Level: Future Series; Format: 32MS/16WS/16MD/4WD/16XD	(New Zealand) Bjorn Seguin (Mexico) Deyanira Angulo	(New Caledonia) William Jannic (New Caledonia) Cecile Kaddour
September 6	(New Caledonia) Nouméa International: Host: Nouméa, New Caledonia; Level: Future Series; Format: 32MS/16WS/16MD/4WD/16XD	Score: 21-13, 21-9	
September 6	(Belgium) Belgian International: Host: Leuven, Belgium; Level: International Challenge; Format: 32MS/32WS/32MD/32WD/32XD	(Germany) Marc Zwiebler	(Netherlands) Eric Pang
September 6	(Belgium) Belgian International: Host: Leuven, Belgium; Level: International Challenge; Format: 32MS/32WS/32MD/32WD/32XD	Score: 21-15, 21-17	
September 6	(Belgium) Belgian International: Host: Leuven, Belgium; Level: International Challenge; Format: 32MS/32WS/32MD/32WD/32XD	(Germany) Juliane Schenk	(England) Elizabeth Cann
September 6	(Belgium) Belgian International: Host: Leuven, Belgium; Level: International Challenge; Format: 32MS/32WS/32MD/32WD/32XD	Score: 21-7, 21-5	
September 6	(Belgium) Belgian International: Host: Leuven, Belgium; Level: International Challenge; Format: 32MS/32WS/32MD/32WD/32XD	(Germany) Ingo Kindervater (Germany) Johannes Schöttler	(Germany) Michael Fuchs (Germany) Oliver Roth
September 6	(Belgium) Belgian International: Host: Leuven, Belgium; Level: International Challenge; Format: 32MS/32WS/32MD/32WD/32XD	Score: Walkover	
September 6	(Belgium) Belgian International: Host: Leuven, Belgium; Level: International Challenge; Format: 32MS/32WS/32MD/32WD/32XD	(Germany) Sandra Marinello (Germany) Birgit Overzier	(Netherlands) Lotte Jonathans (Netherlands) Paulien Van Dooremalen
September 6	(Belgium) Belgian International: Host: Leuven, Belgium; Level: International Challenge; Format: 32MS/32WS/32MD/32WD/32XD	Score: 21-19, 18-21, 21-12	
September 6	(Belgium) Belgian International: Host: Leuven, Belgium; Level: International Challenge; Format: 32MS/32WS/32MD/32WD/32XD	(Germany) Michael Fuchs (Germany) Birgit Overzier	(Germany) Johannes Schöttler (Germany) Sandra Marinello
September 6	(Belgium) Belgian International: Host: Leuven, Belgium; Level: International Challenge; Format: 32MS/32WS/32MD/32WD/32XD	Score: 22-20, 21-19	
September 13	China Masters (Draw): Host: Changzhou, China; Level: Superseries; Format: 32MS/32WS/32MD/32WD/32XD	(China) Lin Dan	(China) Chen Long
September 13	China Masters (Draw): Host: Changzhou, China; Level: Superseries; Format: 32MS/32WS/32MD/32WD/32XD	Score: 21-15, 13-21, 21-14	
September 13	China Masters (Draw): Host: Changzhou, China; Level: Superseries; Format: 32MS/32WS/32MD/32WD/32XD	(China) Wang Xin	(Denmark) Tine Baun
September 13	China Masters (Draw): Host: Changzhou, China; Level: Superseries; Format: 32MS/32WS/32MD/32WD/32XD	Score: 21-13, 21-9	
September 13	China Masters (Draw): Host: Changzhou, China; Level: Superseries; Format: 32MS/32WS/32MD/32WD/32XD	(China) Cai Yun (China) Fu Haifeng	(South Korea) Ko Sung-hyun (South Korea) Yoo Yeon-seong
September 13	China Masters (Draw): Host: Changzhou, China; Level: Superseries; Format: 32MS/32WS/32MD/32WD/32XD	Score: 21-14, 21-19	
September 13	China Masters (Draw): Host: Changzhou, China; Level: Superseries; Format: 32MS/32WS/32MD/32WD/32XD	(China) Wang Xiaoli (China) Yu Yang	(China) Bao Yixin (China) Lu Lu
September 13	China Masters (Draw): Host: Changzhou, China; Level: Superseries; Format: 32MS/32WS/32MD/32WD/32XD	Score: 21-8, 21-8	
September 13	China Masters (Draw): Host: Changzhou, China; Level: Superseries; Format: 32MS/32WS/32MD/32WD/32XD	(China) Tao Jiaming (China) Tian Qing	(China) Xu Chen (China) Yu Yang
September 13	China Masters (Draw): Host: Changzhou, China; Level: Superseries; Format: 32MS/32WS/32MD/32WD/32XD	Score: 21-11, 21-14	
September 13	(Ukraine) Kharkiv International: Host: Kharkiv, Ukraine; Level: International Challenge; Format: 32MS/32WS/32MD/16WD/32XD	(Russia) Ivan Sozonov	(Poland) Przemysław Wacha
September 13	(Ukraine) Kharkiv International: Host: Kharkiv, Ukraine; Level: International Challenge; Format: 32MS/32WS/32MD/16WD/32XD	Score: 21-14, 22-20	
September 13	(Ukraine) Kharkiv International: Host: Kharkiv, Ukraine; Level: International Challenge; Format: 32MS/32WS/32MD/16WD/32XD	(Ukraine) Larisa Griga	(Ukraine) Mariya Ulitina
September 13	(Ukraine) Kharkiv International: Host: Kharkiv, Ukraine; Level: International Challenge; Format: 32MS/32WS/32MD/16WD/32XD	Score: 21-14, 17-21, 21-13	
September 13	(Ukraine) Kharkiv International: Host: Kharkiv, Ukraine; Level: International Challenge; Format: 32MS/32WS/32MD/16WD/32XD	(Poland) Adam Cwalina (Poland) Michal Logosz	(Russia) Vladimir Ivanov (Russia) Ivan Sozonov
September 13	(Ukraine) Kharkiv International: Host: Kharkiv, Ukraine; Level: International Challenge; Format: 32MS/32WS/32MD/16WD/32XD	Score: 28-26, 21-15	
September 13	(Ukraine) Kharkiv International: Host: Kharkiv, Ukraine; Level: International Challenge; Format: 32MS/32WS/32MD/16WD/32XD	(Ukraine) Mariya Ulitina (Ukraine) Natalya Voytsekh	(Ukraine) Anna Kobtseva (Ukraine) Elena Prus
September 13	(Ukraine) Kharkiv International: Host: Kharkiv, Ukraine; Level: International Challenge; Format: 32MS/32WS/32MD/16WD/32XD	Score: 23-21, 21-12	
September 13	(Ukraine) Kharkiv International: Host: Kharkiv, Ukraine; Level: International Challenge; Format: 32MS/32WS/32MD/16WD/32XD	(Ukraine) Valeriy Atrashchenkov (Ukraine) Elena Prus	(Belarus) Aliaksei Konakh (Belarus) Alesia Zaitsava
September 13	(Ukraine) Kharkiv International: Host: Kharkiv, Ukraine; Level: International Challenge; Format: 32MS/32WS/32MD/16WD/32XD	Score: 21-19, 21-16	
September 13	Colombia International: Host: Bogotá, Cundinamarca, Colombia; Level: Future Series; Format: 64MS/32WS/32MD/16WD/32XD	(Peru) Rodrigo Pacheco	(Brazil) Hugo Arthuso
September 13	Colombia International: Host: Bogotá, Cundinamarca, Colombia; Level: Future Series; Format: 64MS/32WS/32MD/16WD/32XD	Score: 21-14, 21-14	
September 13	Colombia International: Host: Bogotá, Cundinamarca, Colombia; Level: Future Series; Format: 64MS/32WS/32MD/16WD/32XD	(Peru) Claudia Rivero	(Peru) Cristina Aicardi
September 13	Colombia International: Host: Bogotá, Cundinamarca, Colombia; Level: Future Series; Format: 64MS/32WS/32MD/16WD/32XD	Score: 26-24, 16-21, 21-19	
September 13	Colombia International: Host: Bogotá, Cundinamarca, Colombia; Level: Future Series; Format: 64MS/32WS/32MD/16WD/32XD	(Peru) Pablo Aguilar (Peru) Bruno Monteverde	(Scotland) Alistar Casey (United States) Mathew Fogarty
September 13	Colombia International: Host: Bogotá, Cundinamarca, Colombia; Level: Future Series; Format: 64MS/32WS/32MD/16WD/32XD	Score: 21-11, 18-21, 21-19	
September 13	Colombia International: Host: Bogotá, Cundinamarca, Colombia; Level: Future Series; Format: 64MS/32WS/32MD/16WD/32XD	(Peru) Cristina Aicardi (Peru) Claudia Rivero	(Peru) Katherine Winder (Peru) Claudia Zornoza
September 13	Colombia International: Host: Bogotá, Cundinamarca, Colombia; Level: Future Series; Format: 64MS/32WS/32MD/16WD/32XD	Score: 17-21, 24-22, 21-15	
September 13	Colombia International: Host: Bogotá, Cundinamarca, Colombia; Level: Future Series; Format: 64MS/32WS/32MD/16WD/32XD	(Peru) Rodrigo Pacheco (Peru) Claudia Rivero	(Peru) Mario Cuba (Peru) Katherine Winder
September 13	Colombia International: Host: Bogotá, Cundinamarca, Colombia; Level: Future Series; Format: 64MS/32WS/32MD/16WD/32XD	Score: 1-0 Retired	
September 20	Japan Open (Draw): Host: Tokyo, Japan; Level: Superseries; Format: 32MS/32WS/32MD/32WD/32XD	(Malaysia) Lee Chong Wei	(China) Lin Dan
September 20	Japan Open (Draw): Host: Tokyo, Japan; Level: Superseries; Format: 32MS/32WS/32MD/32WD/32XD	Score: 22-20, 16-21, 21-17	
September 20	Japan Open (Draw): Host: Tokyo, Japan; Level: Superseries; Format: 32MS/32WS/32MD/32WD/32XD	(China) Jiang Yanjiao	(China) Wang Xin
September 20	Japan Open (Draw): Host: Tokyo, Japan; Level: Superseries; Format: 32MS/32WS/32MD/32WD/32XD	Score: 23-21, 21-18	
September 20	Japan Open (Draw): Host: Tokyo, Japan; Level: Superseries; Format: 32MS/32WS/32MD/32WD/32XD	(China) Cai Yun (China) Fu Haifeng	(Malaysia) Koo Kien Keat (Malaysia) Tan Boon Heong
September 20	Japan Open (Draw): Host: Tokyo, Japan; Level: Superseries; Format: 32MS/32WS/32MD/32WD/32XD	Score: 18-21, 21-14, 21-12	
September 20	Japan Open (Draw): Host: Tokyo, Japan; Level: Superseries; Format: 32MS/32WS/32MD/32WD/32XD	(China) Wang Xiaoli (China) Yu Yang	(China) Cheng Shu (China) Zhao Yunlei
September 20	Japan Open (Draw): Host: Tokyo, Japan; Level: Superseries; Format: 32MS/32WS/32MD/32WD/32XD	Score: 21-17, 21-6	
September 20	Japan Open (Draw): Host: Tokyo, Japan; Level: Superseries; Format: 32MS/32WS/32MD/32WD/32XD	(China) Zhang Nan (China) Zhao Yunlei	(China) Tao Jiaming (China) Tian Qing
September 20	Japan Open (Draw): Host: Tokyo, Japan; Level: Superseries; Format: 32MS/32WS/32MD/32WD/32XD	Score: 21-19, 22-20	
September 20	(Slovakia) Slovak Open: Host: Prešov, Slovakia; Level: Future Series; Format: 32MS/32WS/32MD/16WD/32XD	(France) Alexandre Francoise	(France) Maxime Michel
September 20	(Slovakia) Slovak Open: Host: Prešov, Slovakia; Level: Future Series; Format: 32MS/32WS/32MD/16WD/32XD	Score: 18-21, 21-17, 24-22	
September 20	(Slovakia) Slovak Open: Host: Prešov, Slovakia; Level: Future Series; Format: 32MS/32WS/32MD/16WD/32XD	(Ukraine) Mariya Ulitina	(Ukraine) Natalya Voytsekh
September 20	(Slovakia) Slovak Open: Host: Prešov, Slovakia; Level: Future Series; Format: 32MS/32WS/32MD/16WD/32XD	Score: 21-8, 21-13	
September 20	(Slovakia) Slovak Open: Host: Prešov, Slovakia; Level: Future Series; Format: 32MS/32WS/32MD/16WD/32XD	(Netherlands) Jacco Arends (Netherlands) Jelle Mass	(Germany) Maurice Niesner (Germany) Till Zander
September 20	(Slovakia) Slovak Open: Host: Prešov, Slovakia; Level: Future Series; Format: 32MS/32WS/32MD/16WD/32XD	Score: 21-18, 19-21, 21-15	
September 20	(Slovakia) Slovak Open: Host: Prešov, Slovakia; Level: Future Series; Format: 32MS/32WS/32MD/16WD/32XD	(Netherlands) Selena Piek (Netherlands) Iris Tabeling	(Ukraine) Mariya Ulitina (Ukraine) Natalya Voytsekh
September 20	(Slovakia) Slovak Open: Host: Prešov, Slovakia; Level: Future Series; Format: 32MS/32WS/32MD/16WD/32XD	Score: 21-10, 21-18	
September 20	(Slovakia) Slovak Open: Host: Prešov, Slovakia; Level: Future Series; Format: 32MS/32WS/32MD/16WD/32XD	(Netherlands) Jacco Arends (Netherlands) Selena Piek	(Belarus) Aliaksei Konakh (Belarus) Alesia Zaitsava
September 20	(Slovakia) Slovak Open: Host: Prešov, Slovakia; Level: Future Series; Format: 32MS/32WS/32MD/16WD/32XD	Score: 21-15, 21-14	
September 27	(Czech Republic) Czech International: Host: Brno, Czech Republic; Level: International Challenge; Format: 32MS/32WS/32MD/32WD/32XD	(India) Ajay Jayaram	(Republic of Ireland) Scott Evans
September 27	(Czech Republic) Czech International: Host: Brno, Czech Republic; Level: International Challenge; Format: 32MS/32WS/32MD/32WD/32XD	Score: 21-11, 21-8	
September 27	(Czech Republic) Czech International: Host: Brno, Czech Republic; Level: International Challenge; Format: 32MS/32WS/32MD/32WD/32XD	(Denmark) Karina Jorgensen	(France) Sashina Vignes
September 27	(Czech Republic) Czech International: Host: Brno, Czech Republic; Level: International Challenge; Format: 32MS/32WS/32MD/32WD/32XD	Score: 24-22, 22-20	
September 27	(Czech Republic) Czech International: Host: Brno, Czech Republic; Level: International Challenge; Format: 32MS/32WS/32MD/32WD/32XD	(England) Chris Langridge (England) Robin Middleton	(England) Marcus Ellis (England) Peter Mills
September 27	(Czech Republic) Czech International: Host: Brno, Czech Republic; Level: International Challenge; Format: 32MS/32WS/32MD/32WD/32XD	Score: 21-9, 21-19	
September 27	(Czech Republic) Czech International: Host: Brno, Czech Republic; Level: International Challenge; Format: 32MS/32WS/32MD/32WD/32XD	(Netherlands) Selena Piek (Netherlands) Iris Tabeling	(Denmark) Maria Helsbol (Denmark) Anne Skelbaek
September 27	(Czech Republic) Czech International: Host: Brno, Czech Republic; Level: International Challenge; Format: 32MS/32WS/32MD/32WD/32XD	Score: 22-20, 15-21, 21-7	
September 27	(Czech Republic) Czech International: Host: Brno, Czech Republic; Level: International Challenge; Format: 32MS/32WS/32MD/32WD/32XD	(Denmark) Anders Skaarup Rasmussen (Denmark) Anne Skelbaek	(Netherlands) Jelle Maas (Netherlands) Iris Tabeling
September 27	(Czech Republic) Czech International: Host: Brno, Czech Republic; Level: International Challenge; Format: 32MS/32WS/32MD/32WD/32XD	Score: 21-16, 21-11	

=== October ===
Week of	Tournament	Champions	Runners-up
October 4	Commonwealth Games (Draw): Host: New Delhi, India; Level: Multisports event; Format: 20 teams/64MS/64WS/32MD/32WD/64XD	Malaysia	India
October 4	Commonwealth Games (Draw): Host: New Delhi, India; Level: Multisports event; Format: 20 teams/64MS/64WS/32MD/32WD/64XD	Score: 3-1	
October 4	Commonwealth Games (Draw): Host: New Delhi, India; Level: Multisports event; Format: 20 teams/64MS/64WS/32MD/32WD/64XD	(Malaysia) Lee Chong Wei	(England) Rajiv Ouseph
October 4	Commonwealth Games (Draw): Host: New Delhi, India; Level: Multisports event; Format: 20 teams/64MS/64WS/32MD/32WD/64XD	Score: 21–10, 21–8	
October 4	Commonwealth Games (Draw): Host: New Delhi, India; Level: Multisports event; Format: 20 teams/64MS/64WS/32MD/32WD/64XD	(India) Saina Nehwal	(Malaysia) Wong Mew Choo
October 4	Commonwealth Games (Draw): Host: New Delhi, India; Level: Multisports event; Format: 20 teams/64MS/64WS/32MD/32WD/64XD	Score: 19–21, 23–21, 21–13	
October 4	Commonwealth Games (Draw): Host: New Delhi, India; Level: Multisports event; Format: 20 teams/64MS/64WS/32MD/32WD/64XD	(Malaysia) Koo Kien Keat (Malaysia) Tan Boon Heong	(England) Anthony Clark (England) Nathan Robertson
October 4	Commonwealth Games (Draw): Host: New Delhi, India; Level: Multisports event; Format: 20 teams/64MS/64WS/32MD/32WD/64XD	Score: 21–19, 21–14	
October 4	Commonwealth Games (Draw): Host: New Delhi, India; Level: Multisports event; Format: 20 teams/64MS/64WS/32MD/32WD/64XD	(India) Jwala Gutta (India) Ashwini Ponnappa	(Singapore) Shinta Mulia Sari (Singapore) Yao Lei
October 4	Commonwealth Games (Draw): Host: New Delhi, India; Level: Multisports event; Format: 20 teams/64MS/64WS/32MD/32WD/64XD	Score: 21–16, 21–19	
October 4	Commonwealth Games (Draw): Host: New Delhi, India; Level: Multisports event; Format: 20 teams/64MS/64WS/32MD/32WD/64XD	(Malaysia) Koo Kien Keat (Malaysia) Chin Eei Hui	(England) Nathan Robertson (England) Jenny Wallwork
October 4	Commonwealth Games (Draw): Host: New Delhi, India; Level: Multisports event; Format: 20 teams/64MS/64WS/32MD/32WD/64XD	Score: 22–20, 21–12	
October 4	Vietnam Open: Host: Ho Chi Minh City, Vietnam; Level: Grand Prix; Format: 64MS/32WS/32MD/32WD/32XD	(China) Chen Yuekun	(Hong Kong) Wei Nan
October 4	Vietnam Open: Host: Ho Chi Minh City, Vietnam; Level: Grand Prix; Format: 64MS/32WS/32MD/32WD/32XD	Score: 21–13, 21–14	
October 4	Vietnam Open: Host: Ho Chi Minh City, Vietnam; Level: Grand Prix; Format: 64MS/32WS/32MD/32WD/32XD	(Thailand) Ratchanok Intanon	(China) Zhou Hui
October 4	Vietnam Open: Host: Ho Chi Minh City, Vietnam; Level: Grand Prix; Format: 64MS/32WS/32MD/32WD/32XD	Score: 21–17, 22–20	
October 4	Vietnam Open: Host: Ho Chi Minh City, Vietnam; Level: Grand Prix; Format: 64MS/32WS/32MD/32WD/32XD	(Indonesia) Mohammad Ahsan (Indonesia) Bona Septano	(Malaysia) Mohd Fairuzizuan Mohd Tazari (Malaysia) Ong Soon Hock
October 4	Vietnam Open: Host: Ho Chi Minh City, Vietnam; Level: Grand Prix; Format: 64MS/32WS/32MD/32WD/32XD	Score: 21–18, 13–21, 21–17	
October 4	Vietnam Open: Host: Ho Chi Minh City, Vietnam; Level: Grand Prix; Format: 64MS/32WS/32MD/32WD/32XD	(China) Ma Jin (China) Zhong Qianxin	(China) Tang Jinhua (China) Xia Huan
October 4	Vietnam Open: Host: Ho Chi Minh City, Vietnam; Level: Grand Prix; Format: 64MS/32WS/32MD/32WD/32XD	Score: 21–19, 21–23, 21–13	
October 4	Vietnam Open: Host: Ho Chi Minh City, Vietnam; Level: Grand Prix; Format: 64MS/32WS/32MD/32WD/32XD	(China) He Hanbin (China) Ma Jin	(Hong Kong) Yohan Hadikusumo Wiratama (Hong Kong) Tse Ying Suet
October 4	Vietnam Open: Host: Ho Chi Minh City, Vietnam; Level: Grand Prix; Format: 64MS/32WS/32MD/32WD/32XD	Score: 21–18, 21–11	
October 4	Mongolia International: Host: Ulaanbaatar, Mongolia; Level: International Series; Format: 16MS/8WS/8MD/4WD/8XD	(Slovakia) Michal Matejka	(Iran) Ali Shahhosseini
October 4	Mongolia International: Host: Ulaanbaatar, Mongolia; Level: International Series; Format: 16MS/8WS/8MD/4WD/8XD	Score: 11–21, 21–14, 22–20	
October 4	Mongolia International: Host: Ulaanbaatar, Mongolia; Level: International Series; Format: 16MS/8WS/8MD/4WD/8XD	(Slovakia) Monika Fašungová	(Mongolia) Gerelmaa Batchuluun
October 4	Mongolia International: Host: Ulaanbaatar, Mongolia; Level: International Series; Format: 16MS/8WS/8MD/4WD/8XD	Score: 21–10, 21–2	
October 4	Mongolia International: Host: Ulaanbaatar, Mongolia; Level: International Series; Format: 16MS/8WS/8MD/4WD/8XD	(New Zealand) Maoni Hu He (Mongolia) Enkhmandakh Purevsuren	(Mongolia) Shagdar Byambajav (Iran) Ali Shahhosseini
October 4	Mongolia International: Host: Ulaanbaatar, Mongolia; Level: International Series; Format: 16MS/8WS/8MD/4WD/8XD	Score: 18–21, 21–17, 21–18	
October 4	Mongolia International: Host: Ulaanbaatar, Mongolia; Level: International Series; Format: 16MS/8WS/8MD/4WD/8XD	(Mongolia) Gerelmaa Batchuluun (Slovakia) Monika Fašungová	(Mongolia) Khulangoo Baatar (Mongolia) Munkhchimeg Mendjargal
October 4	Mongolia International: Host: Ulaanbaatar, Mongolia; Level: International Series; Format: 16MS/8WS/8MD/4WD/8XD	Score: 21–15, 21–15	
October 4	Mongolia International: Host: Ulaanbaatar, Mongolia; Level: International Series; Format: 16MS/8WS/8MD/4WD/8XD	(Slovakia) Michal Matejka (Slovakia) Monika Fašungová	(Mongolia) Enkhbat Olonbayar (Mongolia) Gerelmaa Batchuluun
October 4	Mongolia International: Host: Ulaanbaatar, Mongolia; Level: International Series; Format: 16MS/8WS/8MD/4WD/8XD	Score: 21–14, 21–16	
October 4	Bulgarian International: Host: Sofia, Bulgaria; Level: International Challenge; Format: 32MS/32WS/32MD/32WD/32XD	(Poland) Przemysław Wacha	(Lithuania) Kęstutis Navickas
October 4	Bulgarian International: Host: Sofia, Bulgaria; Level: International Challenge; Format: 32MS/32WS/32MD/32WD/32XD	Score: 21–14, 11–21, 21–13	
October 4	Bulgarian International: Host: Sofia, Bulgaria; Level: International Challenge; Format: 32MS/32WS/32MD/32WD/32XD	(Bulgaria) Petya Nedelcheva	(Republic of Ireland) Chloe Magee
October 4	Bulgarian International: Host: Sofia, Bulgaria; Level: International Challenge; Format: 32MS/32WS/32MD/32WD/32XD	Score: 21–17, 21–13	
October 4	Bulgarian International: Host: Sofia, Bulgaria; Level: International Challenge; Format: 32MS/32WS/32MD/32WD/32XD	(England) Marcus Ellis (England) Peter Mills	(Scotland) Martin Campbell (Scotland) Angus Gilmour
October 4	Bulgarian International: Host: Sofia, Bulgaria; Level: International Challenge; Format: 32MS/32WS/32MD/32WD/32XD	Score: 21–14, 21–10	
October 4	Bulgarian International: Host: Sofia, Bulgaria; Level: International Challenge; Format: 32MS/32WS/32MD/32WD/32XD	(Bulgaria) Petya Nedelcheva (Russia) Anastasia Russkikh	(Russia) Tatjana Bibik (Russia) Olga Golovanova
October 4	Bulgarian International: Host: Sofia, Bulgaria; Level: International Challenge; Format: 32MS/32WS/32MD/32WD/32XD	Score: Walkover	
October 4	Bulgarian International: Host: Sofia, Bulgaria; Level: International Challenge; Format: 32MS/32WS/32MD/32WD/32XD	(Russia) Evgenij Dremin (Russia) Anastasia Russkikh	(Estonia) Gert Kunka (Sweden) Amanda Högström
October 4	Bulgarian International: Host: Sofia, Bulgaria; Level: International Challenge; Format: 32MS/32WS/32MD/32WD/32XD	Score: 21–14, 26–24	
October 4	Brazil International: Host: São Paulo, Brazil; Level: International Challenge; Format: 64MS/64WS/32MD/32WD/32XD	(United States) Hock Lai Lee	(Guatemala) Kevin Cordón
October 4	Brazil International: Host: São Paulo, Brazil; Level: International Challenge; Format: 64MS/64WS/32MD/32WD/32XD	Score: 21–13, 21–17	
October 4	Brazil International: Host: São Paulo, Brazil; Level: International Challenge; Format: 64MS/64WS/32MD/32WD/32XD	(Indonesia) Ana Rovita	(Germany) Nicole Grether
October 4	Brazil International: Host: São Paulo, Brazil; Level: International Challenge; Format: 64MS/64WS/32MD/32WD/32XD	Score: 25–23, 21–15	
October 4	Brazil International: Host: São Paulo, Brazil; Level: International Challenge; Format: 64MS/64WS/32MD/32WD/32XD	(Indonesia) Didit Juang Indrianto (Indonesia) Seiko Wahyu Kusdianto	(Canada) Adrian Liu (Canada) Derrick Ng
October 4	Brazil International: Host: São Paulo, Brazil; Level: International Challenge; Format: 64MS/64WS/32MD/32WD/32XD	Score: 21–16, 21–11	
October 4	Brazil International: Host: São Paulo, Brazil; Level: International Challenge; Format: 64MS/64WS/32MD/32WD/32XD	(United States) Eva Lee (United States) Paula Lynn Obañana	(United States) Iris Wang (United States) Rena Wang
October 4	Brazil International: Host: São Paulo, Brazil; Level: International Challenge; Format: 64MS/64WS/32MD/32WD/32XD	Score: 14–21, 21–11, 21–12	
October 4	Brazil International: Host: São Paulo, Brazil; Level: International Challenge; Format: 64MS/64WS/32MD/32WD/32XD	(United States) Halim Haryanto (United States) Eva Lee	(United States) Hock Lai Lee (United States) Priscilla Lun
October 4	Brazil International: Host: São Paulo, Brazil; Level: International Challenge; Format: 64MS/64WS/32MD/32WD/32XD	Score: 21–11, 22–20	
October 11	Indonesia Open Grand Prix Gold: Host: Samarinda, Indonesia; Level: Grand Prix Gold; Format: 64MS/32WS/32MD/32WD/32XD	(Indonesia) Taufik Hidayat	(Indonesia) Dionysius Hayom Rumbaka
October 11	Indonesia Open Grand Prix Gold: Host: Samarinda, Indonesia; Level: Grand Prix Gold; Format: 64MS/32WS/32MD/32WD/32XD	Score: 26–28, 21–17, 21–14	
October 11	Indonesia Open Grand Prix Gold: Host: Samarinda, Indonesia; Level: Grand Prix Gold; Format: 64MS/32WS/32MD/32WD/32XD	(Thailand) Ratchanok Intanon	(Chinese Taipei) Cheng Shao-chieh
October 11	Indonesia Open Grand Prix Gold: Host: Samarinda, Indonesia; Level: Grand Prix Gold; Format: 64MS/32WS/32MD/32WD/32XD	Score: 21–12, 19–21, 21–16	
October 11	Indonesia Open Grand Prix Gold: Host: Samarinda, Indonesia; Level: Grand Prix Gold; Format: 64MS/32WS/32MD/32WD/32XD	(Indonesia) Mohammad Ahsan (Indonesia) Bona Septano	(Indonesia) Yonatan Suryatama Dasuki (Indonesia) Rian Sukmawan
October 11	Indonesia Open Grand Prix Gold: Host: Samarinda, Indonesia; Level: Grand Prix Gold; Format: 64MS/32WS/32MD/32WD/32XD	Score: 21–16, 18–17 retired	
October 11	Indonesia Open Grand Prix Gold: Host: Samarinda, Indonesia; Level: Grand Prix Gold; Format: 64MS/32WS/32MD/32WD/32XD	(China) Luo Ying (China) Luo Yu	(Indonesia) Meiliana Jauhari (Indonesia) Greysia Polii
October 11	Indonesia Open Grand Prix Gold: Host: Samarinda, Indonesia; Level: Grand Prix Gold; Format: 64MS/32WS/32MD/32WD/32XD	Score: 11–21, 21–18, 21–11	
October 11	Indonesia Open Grand Prix Gold: Host: Samarinda, Indonesia; Level: Grand Prix Gold; Format: 64MS/32WS/32MD/32WD/32XD	(Indonesia) Tontowi Ahmad (Indonesia) Liliyana Natsir	(Indonesia) Markis Kido (Indonesia) Lita Nurlita
October 11	Indonesia Open Grand Prix Gold: Host: Samarinda, Indonesia; Level: Grand Prix Gold; Format: 64MS/32WS/32MD/32WD/32XD	Score: 21–11, 21–13	
October 11	Cyprus International: Host: Nicosia, Cyprus; Level: International Series; Format: 32MS/32WS/32MD/16WD/32XD	(Denmark) Viktor Axelsen	(France) Simon Maunoury
October 11	Cyprus International: Host: Nicosia, Cyprus; Level: International Series; Format: 32MS/32WS/32MD/16WD/32XD	Score: 21–10, 21–11	
October 11	Cyprus International: Host: Nicosia, Cyprus; Level: International Series; Format: 32MS/32WS/32MD/16WD/32XD	(Spain) Carolina Marín	(Russia) Olga Golovanova
October 11	Cyprus International: Host: Nicosia, Cyprus; Level: International Series; Format: 32MS/32WS/32MD/16WD/32XD	Score: 21–12, 25–27, 21–14	
October 11	Cyprus International: Host: Nicosia, Cyprus; Level: International Series; Format: 32MS/32WS/32MD/16WD/32XD	(Indonesia) Didit Juang Indrianto (Indonesia) Seiko Wahyu Kusdianto	(Denmark) Niclas Nøhr (Denmark) Mads Pedersen
October 11	Cyprus International: Host: Nicosia, Cyprus; Level: International Series; Format: 32MS/32WS/32MD/16WD/32XD	Score: 21–15, 15–21, 21–19	
October 11	Cyprus International: Host: Nicosia, Cyprus; Level: International Series; Format: 32MS/32WS/32MD/16WD/32XD	(Russia) Romina Gabdullina (Russia) Evgeniya Kosetskaya	(Denmark) Lena Grebak (Denmark) Camilla Overgaard
October 11	Cyprus International: Host: Nicosia, Cyprus; Level: International Series; Format: 32MS/32WS/32MD/16WD/32XD	Score: 21–18, 21–9	
October 11	Cyprus International: Host: Nicosia, Cyprus; Level: International Series; Format: 32MS/32WS/32MD/16WD/32XD	(Denmark) Niclas Nøhr (Denmark) Lena Grebak	(Russia) Denis Grachev (Russia) Anastasia Chervyakova
October 11	Cyprus International: Host: Nicosia, Cyprus; Level: International Series; Format: 32MS/32WS/32MD/16WD/32XD	Score: 21–13, 18–21, 21–12	
October 18	Pan Am Badminton Championships (Draw): Host: Curitiba, Brazil; Level: Continental Team Championships; Format: 6XT/32MS/32WS/16MD/16WD/32XD	Canada	United States
October 18	Pan Am Badminton Championships (Draw): Host: Curitiba, Brazil; Level: Continental Team Championships; Format: 6XT/32MS/32WS/16MD/16WD/32XD	Score: 3–1	
October 18	Pan Am Badminton Championships (Draw): Host: Curitiba, Brazil; Level: Continental Team Championships; Format: 6XT/32MS/32WS/16MD/16WD/32XD	(Canada) Stephan Wojcikiewicz	(Peru) Rodrigo Pacheco
October 18	Pan Am Badminton Championships (Draw): Host: Curitiba, Brazil; Level: Continental Team Championships; Format: 6XT/32MS/32WS/16MD/16WD/32XD	Score: 15–21, 21–7, 21–13	
October 18	Pan Am Badminton Championships (Draw): Host: Curitiba, Brazil; Level: Continental Team Championships; Format: 6XT/32MS/32WS/16MD/16WD/32XD	(United States) Cee Nantana Ketpura	(Canada) Michelle Li
October 18	Pan Am Badminton Championships (Draw): Host: Curitiba, Brazil; Level: Continental Team Championships; Format: 6XT/32MS/32WS/16MD/16WD/32XD	Score: 17–21, 21–17, 21–19	
October 18	Pan Am Badminton Championships (Draw): Host: Curitiba, Brazil; Level: Continental Team Championships; Format: 6XT/32MS/32WS/16MD/16WD/32XD	(United States) Sameera Gunatileka (United States) Vincent Nguy	(Brazil) Hugo Arthuso (Brazil) Daniel Paiola
October 18	Pan Am Badminton Championships (Draw): Host: Curitiba, Brazil; Level: Continental Team Championships; Format: 6XT/32MS/32WS/16MD/16WD/32XD	Score: 21–19, 19–21, 21–17	
October 18	Pan Am Badminton Championships (Draw): Host: Curitiba, Brazil; Level: Continental Team Championships; Format: 6XT/32MS/32WS/16MD/16WD/32XD	(Canada) Grace Gao (Canada) Joycelyn Ko	(Canada) Alex Bruce (Canada) Michelle Li
October 18	Pan Am Badminton Championships (Draw): Host: Curitiba, Brazil; Level: Continental Team Championships; Format: 6XT/32MS/32WS/16MD/16WD/32XD	Score: 16–21, 23–21, 21–12	
October 18	Pan Am Badminton Championships (Draw): Host: Curitiba, Brazil; Level: Continental Team Championships; Format: 6XT/32MS/32WS/16MD/16WD/32XD	(Canada) Toby Ng (Canada) Grace Gao	(Canada) Kevin Li (Canada) Alex Bruce
October 18	Pan Am Badminton Championships (Draw): Host: Curitiba, Brazil; Level: Continental Team Championships; Format: 6XT/32MS/32WS/16MD/16WD/32XD	Score: 21–7, 21–9	
October 18	Dutch Open: Host: Almere, Netherlands; Level: Grand Prix; Format: 64MS/32WS/32MD/32WD/32XD	(Japan) Sho Sasaki	(India) Ajay Jayaram
October 18	Dutch Open: Host: Almere, Netherlands; Level: Grand Prix; Format: 64MS/32WS/32MD/32WD/32XD	Score: 21–16, 21–19	
October 18	Dutch Open: Host: Almere, Netherlands; Level: Grand Prix; Format: 64MS/32WS/32MD/32WD/32XD	(Germany) Juliane Schenk	(Netherlands) Yao Jie
October 18	Dutch Open: Host: Almere, Netherlands; Level: Grand Prix; Format: 64MS/32WS/32MD/32WD/32XD	Score: 21–13, 14–21, 21–15	
October 18	Dutch Open: Host: Almere, Netherlands; Level: Grand Prix; Format: 64MS/32WS/32MD/32WD/32XD	(Japan) Hirokatsu Hashimoto (Japan) Noriyasu Hirata	(Japan) Yoshiteru Hirobe (Japan) Kenta Kazuno
October 18	Dutch Open: Host: Almere, Netherlands; Level: Grand Prix; Format: 64MS/32WS/32MD/32WD/32XD	Score: 21–17, 21–13	
October 18	Dutch Open: Host: Almere, Netherlands; Level: Grand Prix; Format: 64MS/32WS/32MD/32WD/32XD	(Russia) Valeria Sorokina (Russia) Nina Vislova	(Japan) Mizuki Fujii (Japan) Reika Kakiiwa
October 18	Dutch Open: Host: Almere, Netherlands; Level: Grand Prix; Format: 64MS/32WS/32MD/32WD/32XD	Score: 21–19, 21–19	
October 18	Dutch Open: Host: Almere, Netherlands; Level: Grand Prix; Format: 64MS/32WS/32MD/32WD/32XD	(Russia) Aleksandr Nikolaenko (Russia) Valeria Sorokina	(Japan) Shintaro Ikeda (Japan) Reiko Shiota
October 18	Dutch Open: Host: Almere, Netherlands; Level: Grand Prix; Format: 64MS/32WS/32MD/32WD/32XD	Score: 22–20, 21–9	
October 25	Denmark Open (Draw): Host: Odense, Denmark; Level: Superseries; Format: 32MS/32WS/32MD/32WD/32XD	(Denmark) Jan Ø. Jørgensen	(Indonesia) Taufik Hidayat
October 25	Denmark Open (Draw): Host: Odense, Denmark; Level: Superseries; Format: 32MS/32WS/32MD/32WD/32XD	Score: 21–19, 21–19	
October 25	Denmark Open (Draw): Host: Odense, Denmark; Level: Superseries; Format: 32MS/32WS/32MD/32WD/32XD	(China) Wang Yihan	(China) Liu Xin
October 25	Denmark Open (Draw): Host: Odense, Denmark; Level: Superseries; Format: 32MS/32WS/32MD/32WD/32XD	Score: 21–14, 21–12	
October 25	Denmark Open (Draw): Host: Odense, Denmark; Level: Superseries; Format: 32MS/32WS/32MD/32WD/32XD	(Denmark) Mathias Boe (Denmark) Carsten Mogensen	(Indonesia) Markis Kido (Indonesia) Hendra Setiawan
October 25	Denmark Open (Draw): Host: Odense, Denmark; Level: Superseries; Format: 32MS/32WS/32MD/32WD/32XD	Score: 21–13, 21–12	
October 25	Denmark Open (Draw): Host: Odense, Denmark; Level: Superseries; Format: 32MS/32WS/32MD/32WD/32XD	(Japan) Miyuki Maeda (Japan) Satoko Suetsuna	(Japan) Shizuka Matsuo (Japan) Mami Naito
October 25	Denmark Open (Draw): Host: Odense, Denmark; Level: Superseries; Format: 32MS/32WS/32MD/32WD/32XD	Score: 21–17, 21–14	
October 25	Denmark Open (Draw): Host: Odense, Denmark; Level: Superseries; Format: 32MS/32WS/32MD/32WD/32XD	(Denmark) Thomas Laybourn (Denmark) Kamilla Rytter Juhl	(England) Nathan Robertson (England) Jenny Wallwork
October 25	Denmark Open (Draw): Host: Odense, Denmark; Level: Superseries; Format: 32MS/32WS/32MD/32WD/32XD	Score: 21–12, 12–21, 21–9	
October 25	Santo Domingo Open: Host: Santo Domingo, Dominican Republic; Level: International Series; Format: 64MS/64WS/32MD/16WD/32XD	(Portugal) Pedro Martins	(Guatemala) Kevin Cordón
October 25	Santo Domingo Open: Host: Santo Domingo, Dominican Republic; Level: International Series; Format: 64MS/64WS/32MD/16WD/32XD	Score: 21-10, 21-13	
October 25	Santo Domingo Open: Host: Santo Domingo, Dominican Republic; Level: International Series; Format: 64MS/64WS/32MD/16WD/32XD	(Portugal) Telma Santos	(Italy) Agnese Allegrini
October 25	Santo Domingo Open: Host: Santo Domingo, Dominican Republic; Level: International Series; Format: 64MS/64WS/32MD/16WD/32XD	Score: 21–11, 23–21	
October 25	Santo Domingo Open: Host: Santo Domingo, Dominican Republic; Level: International Series; Format: 64MS/64WS/32MD/16WD/32XD	(Guatemala) Kevin Cordón (Guatemala) Rodolfo Ramirez	(Canada) Adrian Liu (Canada) Derrick Ng
October 25	Santo Domingo Open: Host: Santo Domingo, Dominican Republic; Level: International Series; Format: 64MS/64WS/32MD/16WD/32XD	Score: 21–18, 24–22	
October 25	Santo Domingo Open: Host: Santo Domingo, Dominican Republic; Level: International Series; Format: 64MS/64WS/32MD/16WD/32XD	(Germany) Nicole Grether (Canada) Charmaine Reid	(Canada) Valerie Jacques (Canada) Florence Lavoie
October 25	Santo Domingo Open: Host: Santo Domingo, Dominican Republic; Level: International Series; Format: 64MS/64WS/32MD/16WD/32XD	Score: 21–12, 21–13	
October 25	Santo Domingo Open: Host: Santo Domingo, Dominican Republic; Level: International Series; Format: 64MS/64WS/32MD/16WD/32XD	(Canada) Toby Ng (Canada) Grace Gao	(Canada) Adrian Liu (Canada) Joycelyn Ko
October 25	Santo Domingo Open: Host: Santo Domingo, Dominican Republic; Level: International Series; Format: 64MS/64WS/32MD/16WD/32XD	Score: 20–22, 21–14, 21–10	

=== November ===
Week of	Tournament	Champions	Runners-up
November 1	(France) French Open (Draw): Host: Paris, France; Level: Superseries; Format: 32MS/32WS/32MD/32WD/32XD	(Indonesia) Taufik Hidayat	(Denmark) Joachim Persson
November 1	(France) French Open (Draw): Host: Paris, France; Level: Superseries; Format: 32MS/32WS/32MD/32WD/32XD	Score: 21-16, 21-11	
November 1	(France) French Open (Draw): Host: Paris, France; Level: Superseries; Format: 32MS/32WS/32MD/32WD/32XD	(China) Wang Yihan	(China) Li Xuerui
November 1	(France) French Open (Draw): Host: Paris, France; Level: Superseries; Format: 32MS/32WS/32MD/32WD/32XD	Score: 21-13, 21-9	
November 1	(France) French Open (Draw): Host: Paris, France; Level: Superseries; Format: 32MS/32WS/32MD/32WD/32XD	(Denmark) Mathias Boe (Denmark) Carsten Mogensen	(Germany) Ingo Kindervater (Germany) Johannes Schöttler
November 1	(France) French Open (Draw): Host: Paris, France; Level: Superseries; Format: 32MS/32WS/32MD/32WD/32XD	Score: 21-15, 21-9	
November 1	(France) French Open (Draw): Host: Paris, France; Level: Superseries; Format: 32MS/32WS/32MD/32WD/32XD	(Thailand) Duanganong Aroonkesorn (Thailand) Kunchala Voravichitchaikul	(Bulgaria) Petya Nedelcheva (Russia) Anastasia Russkikh
November 1	(France) French Open (Draw): Host: Paris, France; Level: Superseries; Format: 32MS/32WS/32MD/32WD/32XD	Score: 21-16, 11-2 Retired	
November 1	(France) French Open (Draw): Host: Paris, France; Level: Superseries; Format: 32MS/32WS/32MD/32WD/32XD	(Thailand) Sudket Prapakamol (Thailand) Saralee Thoungthongkam	(Germany) Michael Fuchs (Germany) Birgit Overzier
November 1	(France) French Open (Draw): Host: Paris, France; Level: Superseries; Format: 32MS/32WS/32MD/32WD/32XD	Score: 21-15, 21-15	
November 1	(Laos) Lao International: Host: Vientiane, Laos; Level: International Challenge; Format: 64MS/16WS/32MD/16WD/16XD	(Indonesia) Tommy Sugiarto	(Russia) Stanislav Pukhov
November 1	(Laos) Lao International: Host: Vientiane, Laos; Level: International Challenge; Format: 64MS/16WS/32MD/16WD/16XD	Score: 21-19, 21-13	
November 1	(Laos) Lao International: Host: Vientiane, Laos; Level: International Challenge; Format: 64MS/16WS/32MD/16WD/16XD	(Thailand) Nitchaon Jindapol	(Japan) Nozomi Okuhara
November 1	(Laos) Lao International: Host: Vientiane, Laos; Level: International Challenge; Format: 64MS/16WS/32MD/16WD/16XD	Score: 21-16, 21-17	
November 1	(Laos) Lao International: Host: Vientiane, Laos; Level: International Challenge; Format: 64MS/16WS/32MD/16WD/16XD	(Thailand) Patipat Chalardchaleam (Thailand) Nipitphon Puangpuapech	(Vietnam) Duong Bao Duc (Vietnam) Pham Cao Hieu
November 1	(Laos) Lao International: Host: Vientiane, Laos; Level: International Challenge; Format: 64MS/16WS/32MD/16WD/16XD	Score: 21-15, 21-9	
November 1	(Laos) Lao International: Host: Vientiane, Laos; Level: International Challenge; Format: 64MS/16WS/32MD/16WD/16XD	(Japan) Rie Eto (Japan) Yu Wakita	(Thailand) Peranart Nandatheero (Thailand) Prangnuch Lerthiran
November 1	(Laos) Lao International: Host: Vientiane, Laos; Level: International Challenge; Format: 64MS/16WS/32MD/16WD/16XD	Score: 21-18, 21-8	
November 1	(Laos) Lao International: Host: Vientiane, Laos; Level: International Challenge; Format: 64MS/16WS/32MD/16WD/16XD	(Philippines) Kennevic Asuncion (Philippines) Kennie Asuncion	(Thailand) Siriwat Matayanumati (Thailand) Pattaraporn Jindapol
November 1	(Laos) Lao International: Host: Vientiane, Laos; Level: International Challenge; Format: 64MS/16WS/32MD/16WD/16XD	Score: 11-21, 21-16, 21-17	
November 1	(Hungary) Hungarian International: Host: Budaörs, Hungary; Level: International Series; Format: 32MS/32WS/32MD/32WD/32XD	(Finland) Ville Lang	(Belgium) Yuhan Tan
November 1	(Hungary) Hungarian International: Host: Budaörs, Hungary; Level: International Series; Format: 32MS/32WS/32MD/32WD/32XD	Score: 22-20, 21-16	
November 1	(Hungary) Hungarian International: Host: Budaörs, Hungary; Level: International Series; Format: 32MS/32WS/32MD/32WD/32XD	(Germany) Karin Schnaase	(Greece) Anne Hald-Jensen
November 1	(Hungary) Hungarian International: Host: Budaörs, Hungary; Level: International Series; Format: 32MS/32WS/32MD/32WD/32XD	Score: 21-15, 21-16	
November 1	(Hungary) Hungarian International: Host: Budaörs, Hungary; Level: International Series; Format: 32MS/32WS/32MD/32WD/32XD	(Germany) Peter Kasbauer (Germany) Josche Zurwonne	(Germany) Maurice Niesner (Germany) Till Zander
November 1	(Hungary) Hungarian International: Host: Budaörs, Hungary; Level: International Series; Format: 32MS/32WS/32MD/32WD/32XD	Score: 21-17, 22-20	
November 1	(Hungary) Hungarian International: Host: Budaörs, Hungary; Level: International Series; Format: 32MS/32WS/32MD/32WD/32XD	(Germany) Johanna Goliszewski (Germany) Carla Nelte	(Germany) Claudia Vogelgsang (Germany) Kim Buss
November 1	(Hungary) Hungarian International: Host: Budaörs, Hungary; Level: International Series; Format: 32MS/32WS/32MD/32WD/32XD	Score: 21-14, 22-20	
November 1	(Hungary) Hungarian International: Host: Budaörs, Hungary; Level: International Series; Format: 32MS/32WS/32MD/32WD/32XD	(Netherlands) Jacco Arends (Netherlands) Selena Piek	(Germany) Peter Kasbauer (Germany) Johanna Goliszewski
November 1	(Hungary) Hungarian International: Host: Budaörs, Hungary; Level: International Series; Format: 32MS/32WS/32MD/32WD/32XD	Score: 21-15, 21-14	
November 1	Puerto Rico International: Host: San Juan, Puerto Rico; Level: International Challenge; Format: 32MS/32WS/32MD/16WD/32XD	(Italy) Wisnnu Putro	(Portugal) Pedro Martins
November 1	Puerto Rico International: Host: San Juan, Puerto Rico; Level: International Challenge; Format: 32MS/32WS/32MD/16WD/32XD	Score: 21-10, 21-18	
November 1	Puerto Rico International: Host: San Juan, Puerto Rico; Level: International Challenge; Format: 32MS/32WS/32MD/16WD/32XD	(Italy) Agnese Allegrini	(Canada) Joyceline Ko
November 1	Puerto Rico International: Host: San Juan, Puerto Rico; Level: International Challenge; Format: 32MS/32WS/32MD/16WD/32XD	Score: 21-18, 21-18	
November 1	Puerto Rico International: Host: San Juan, Puerto Rico; Level: International Challenge; Format: 32MS/32WS/32MD/16WD/32XD	(Canada) Toby Ng (Canada) Jon Vandervet	(United States) Sammera Gunatileka (United States) Vincent Nguy
November 1	Puerto Rico International: Host: San Juan, Puerto Rico; Level: International Challenge; Format: 32MS/32WS/32MD/16WD/32XD	Score: 21-16, 21-17	
November 1	Puerto Rico International: Host: San Juan, Puerto Rico; Level: International Challenge; Format: 32MS/32WS/32MD/16WD/32XD	(Germany) Nicole Grether (Canada) Charmaine Reid	(Peru) Christina Aicardi (Peru) Claudia Rivero
November 1	Puerto Rico International: Host: San Juan, Puerto Rico; Level: International Challenge; Format: 32MS/32WS/32MD/16WD/32XD	Score: 21-12, 21-9	
November 1	Puerto Rico International: Host: San Juan, Puerto Rico; Level: International Challenge; Format: 32MS/32WS/32MD/16WD/32XD	(United States) Holvy Depauw (United States) Grace Peng	(Canada) Derrick Ng (Canada) Phyllis Chan
November 1	Puerto Rico International: Host: San Juan, Puerto Rico; Level: International Challenge; Format: 32MS/32WS/32MD/16WD/32XD	Score: 16-21, 21-10, 21-13	
November 8	Malaysia International: Host: Kota Kinabalu, Malaysia; Level: International Challenge; Format: 64MS/32WS/32MD/32WD/32XD	(Indonesia) Tommy Sugiarto	(Malaysia) Mohamad Arif Abdul Latif
November 8	Malaysia International: Host: Kota Kinabalu, Malaysia; Level: International Challenge; Format: 64MS/32WS/32MD/32WD/32XD	Score: 19-21, 21-10, 21-13	
November 8	Malaysia International: Host: Kota Kinabalu, Malaysia; Level: International Challenge; Format: 64MS/32WS/32MD/32WD/32XD	(Japan) Ayane Kurihara	(Japan) Masayo Nojirino
November 8	Malaysia International: Host: Kota Kinabalu, Malaysia; Level: International Challenge; Format: 64MS/32WS/32MD/32WD/32XD	Score: 21-15, 18-21, 21-10	
November 8	Malaysia International: Host: Kota Kinabalu, Malaysia; Level: International Challenge; Format: 64MS/32WS/32MD/32WD/32XD	(Malaysia) Lim Khim Wah (Malaysia) Goh Wei Shem	(Indonesia) Andrei Adistia (Indonesia) Rahmat Adianto
November 8	Malaysia International: Host: Kota Kinabalu, Malaysia; Level: International Challenge; Format: 64MS/32WS/32MD/32WD/32XD	Score: 21-15, 21-16	
November 8	Malaysia International: Host: Kota Kinabalu, Malaysia; Level: International Challenge; Format: 64MS/32WS/32MD/32WD/32XD	(Malaysia) Chin Eei Hui (Malaysia) Lai Pei Jing	(Indonesia) Gebby Ristiyani Imawan (Indonesia) Tiara Rosalia Nuraidah
November 8	Malaysia International: Host: Kota Kinabalu, Malaysia; Level: International Challenge; Format: 64MS/32WS/32MD/32WD/32XD	Score: 21-15, 21-10	
November 8	Malaysia International: Host: Kota Kinabalu, Malaysia; Level: International Challenge; Format: 64MS/32WS/32MD/32WD/32XD	(Malaysia) Lim Khim Wah (Malaysia) Chong Sook Chin	(Malaysia) Mohd Razif Ab Latif (Malaysia) Amelia Alicia Anscelly
November 8	Malaysia International: Host: Kota Kinabalu, Malaysia; Level: International Challenge; Format: 64MS/32WS/32MD/32WD/32XD	Score: 30-28, 21-13	
November 8	(United States) Miami PanAm International: Host: Miami Lakes, Florida, United States; Level: Future Series; Format: 32MS/16WS/16MD/8WD/16XD	(Guatemala) Kevin Cordon	(United States) Hock Lai Lee
November 8	(United States) Miami PanAm International: Host: Miami Lakes, Florida, United States; Level: Future Series; Format: 32MS/16WS/16MD/8WD/16XD	Score: 13-21, 21-14, 21-18	
November 8	(United States) Miami PanAm International: Host: Miami Lakes, Florida, United States; Level: Future Series; Format: 32MS/16WS/16MD/8WD/16XD	(Italy) Agnese Allegrini	(Germany) Nicole Grether
November 8	(United States) Miami PanAm International: Host: Miami Lakes, Florida, United States; Level: Future Series; Format: 32MS/16WS/16MD/8WD/16XD	Score: 21-16, 21-17	
November 8	(United States) Miami PanAm International: Host: Miami Lakes, Florida, United States; Level: Future Series; Format: 32MS/16WS/16MD/8WD/16XD	(United States) Sameera Gunatileka (United States) Vincent Nguy	(Suriname) Virgil Soeroredjo (Suriname) Mitchel Wongsodikromo
November 8	(United States) Miami PanAm International: Host: Miami Lakes, Florida, United States; Level: Future Series; Format: 32MS/16WS/16MD/8WD/16XD	Score: 21-14, 21-17	
November 8	(United States) Miami PanAm International: Host: Miami Lakes, Florida, United States; Level: Future Series; Format: 32MS/16WS/16MD/8WD/16XD	(Germany) Nicole Grether (Canada) Charmaine Reid	(Mexico) Cynthia Gonzalez (Mexico) Victoria Montero
November 8	(United States) Miami PanAm International: Host: Miami Lakes, Florida, United States; Level: Future Series; Format: 32MS/16WS/16MD/8WD/16XD	Score: 21-11, 21-12	
November 8	(United States) Miami PanAm International: Host: Miami Lakes, Florida, United States; Level: Future Series; Format: 32MS/16WS/16MD/8WD/16XD	(United States) Hock Lai Lee (United States) Priscilla Lun	(New Zealand) Bjorn Seguin (Mexico) Deyanira Angulo
November 8	(United States) Miami PanAm International: Host: Miami Lakes, Florida, United States; Level: Future Series; Format: 32MS/16WS/16MD/8WD/16XD	Score: 21-13, 21-8	
November 8	Iceland International: Host: Reykjavík, Iceland; Level: Future Series; Format: 32MS/32WS/32MD/16WD/32XD	(Denmark) Kim Bruun	(Denmark) Jacob Damgaard Eriksen
November 8	Iceland International: Host: Reykjavík, Iceland; Level: Future Series; Format: 32MS/32WS/32MD/16WD/32XD	Score: 14-21, 21-16, 21-19	
November 8	Iceland International: Host: Reykjavík, Iceland; Level: Future Series; Format: 32MS/32WS/32MD/16WD/32XD	(Iceland) Ragna Ingólfsdóttir	(Malaysia) Anita Raj Kaur
November 8	Iceland International: Host: Reykjavík, Iceland; Level: Future Series; Format: 32MS/32WS/32MD/16WD/32XD	Score: 21-17, 21-18	
November 8	Iceland International: Host: Reykjavík, Iceland; Level: Future Series; Format: 32MS/32WS/32MD/16WD/32XD	(Denmark) Emil Holst (Denmark) Mikkel Mikkelsen	(Denmark) Frederik Colberg (Denmark) Kasper Paulsen
November 8	Iceland International: Host: Reykjavík, Iceland; Level: Future Series; Format: 32MS/32WS/32MD/16WD/32XD	Score: 21-15, 21-17	
November 8	Iceland International: Host: Reykjavík, Iceland; Level: Future Series; Format: 32MS/32WS/32MD/16WD/32XD	(Iceland) Katrín Atladóttir (Iceland) Ragna Ingólfsdóttir	(Iceland) Erla Björg Hafsteinsdóttir (Iceland) Tinna Helgadóttir
November 8	Iceland International: Host: Reykjavík, Iceland; Level: Future Series; Format: 32MS/32WS/32MD/16WD/32XD	Score: 21-14, 21-13	
November 8	Iceland International: Host: Reykjavík, Iceland; Level: Future Series; Format: 32MS/32WS/32MD/16WD/32XD	(Denmark) Frederik Colberg (Denmark) Mette Poulsen	(Denmark) Kasper Paulsen (Denmark) Josephine Van Zaane
November 8	Iceland International: Host: Reykjavík, Iceland; Level: Future Series; Format: 32MS/32WS/32MD/16WD/32XD	Score: 21-17, 8-21, 21-16	
November 8	(China) Asian Games (Draw): Host: Guangzhou, China; Level: Multisports event; Format: 10MT/10WT/32MS/32WS/32MD/32WD/32XD	China	South Korea
November 8	(China) Asian Games (Draw): Host: Guangzhou, China; Level: Multisports event; Format: 10MT/10WT/32MS/32WS/32MD/32WD/32XD	Score: 3-1	
November 8	(China) Asian Games (Draw): Host: Guangzhou, China; Level: Multisports event; Format: 10MT/10WT/32MS/32WS/32MD/32WD/32XD	China	Thailand
November 8	(China) Asian Games (Draw): Host: Guangzhou, China; Level: Multisports event; Format: 10MT/10WT/32MS/32WS/32MD/32WD/32XD	Score: 3-0	
November 8	(China) Asian Games (Draw): Host: Guangzhou, China; Level: Multisports event; Format: 10MT/10WT/32MS/32WS/32MD/32WD/32XD	(China) Lin Dan	(Malaysia) Lee Chong Wei
November 8	(China) Asian Games (Draw): Host: Guangzhou, China; Level: Multisports event; Format: 10MT/10WT/32MS/32WS/32MD/32WD/32XD	Score: 21-13, 15-21, 21-10	
November 8	(China) Asian Games (Draw): Host: Guangzhou, China; Level: Multisports event; Format: 10MT/10WT/32MS/32WS/32MD/32WD/32XD	(China) Wang Shixian	(China) Wang Xin
November 8	(China) Asian Games (Draw): Host: Guangzhou, China; Level: Multisports event; Format: 10MT/10WT/32MS/32WS/32MD/32WD/32XD	Score: 21-18, 21-15	
November 8	(China) Asian Games (Draw): Host: Guangzhou, China; Level: Multisports event; Format: 10MT/10WT/32MS/32WS/32MD/32WD/32XD	(Indonesia) Markis Kido (Indonesia) Hendra Setiawan	(Malaysia) Koo Kien Keat (Malaysia) Tan Boon Heong
November 8	(China) Asian Games (Draw): Host: Guangzhou, China; Level: Multisports event; Format: 10MT/10WT/32MS/32WS/32MD/32WD/32XD	Score: 16-21, 26-24, 21-19	
November 8	(China) Asian Games (Draw): Host: Guangzhou, China; Level: Multisports event; Format: 10MT/10WT/32MS/32WS/32MD/32WD/32XD	(China) Tian Qing (China) Zhao Yunlei	(China) Wang Xiaoli (China) Yu Yang
November 8	(China) Asian Games (Draw): Host: Guangzhou, China; Level: Multisports event; Format: 10MT/10WT/32MS/32WS/32MD/32WD/32XD	Score: 20-22, 21-15, 21-12	
November 8	(China) Asian Games (Draw): Host: Guangzhou, China; Level: Multisports event; Format: 10MT/10WT/32MS/32WS/32MD/32WD/32XD	(South Korea) Shin Baek-cheol (South Korea) Lee Hyo-jung	(China) Zhang Nan (China) Zhao Yunlei
November 8	(China) Asian Games (Draw): Host: Guangzhou, China; Level: Multisports event; Format: 10MT/10WT/32MS/32WS/32MD/32WD/32XD	Score: 21-19, 21-14	
November 15	(Norway) Norwegian International: Host: Oslo, Norway; Level: International Challenge; Format: 32MS/32WS/32MD/32WD/32XD	(Denmark) Hans-Kristian Vittinghus	(Sweden) Henri Hurskainen
November 15	(Norway) Norwegian International: Host: Oslo, Norway; Level: International Challenge; Format: 32MS/32WS/32MD/32WD/32XD	Score: 21-16, 19-21, 21-8	
November 15	(Norway) Norwegian International: Host: Oslo, Norway; Level: International Challenge; Format: 32MS/32WS/32MD/32WD/32XD	(Germany) Olga Konon	(Ukraine) Larisa Griga
November 15	(Norway) Norwegian International: Host: Oslo, Norway; Level: International Challenge; Format: 32MS/32WS/32MD/32WD/32XD	Score: 21-17, 21-7	
November 15	(Norway) Norwegian International: Host: Oslo, Norway; Level: International Challenge; Format: 32MS/32WS/32MD/32WD/32XD	(Germany) Ingo Kindervater (Germany) Johannes Schöttler	(England) Marcus Ellis (England) Peter Mills
November 15	(Norway) Norwegian International: Host: Oslo, Norway; Level: International Challenge; Format: 32MS/32WS/32MD/32WD/32XD	Score: 21-17, 23-21	
November 15	(Norway) Norwegian International: Host: Oslo, Norway; Level: International Challenge; Format: 32MS/32WS/32MD/32WD/32XD	(Netherlands) Lotte Jonathans (Netherlands) Paulien Van Dooremalen	(Germany) Sandra Marinello (Germany) Birgit Overzier
November 15	(Norway) Norwegian International: Host: Oslo, Norway; Level: International Challenge; Format: 32MS/32WS/32MD/32WD/32XD	Score: 21-14, 21-15	
November 15	(Norway) Norwegian International: Host: Oslo, Norway; Level: International Challenge; Format: 32MS/32WS/32MD/32WD/32XD	(Germany) Michael Fuchs (Germany) Birgit Overzier	(Russia) Evgeny Dremin (Russia) Anastasia Russkikh
November 15	(Norway) Norwegian International: Host: Oslo, Norway; Level: International Challenge; Format: 32MS/32WS/32MD/32WD/32XD	Score: 22-20, 21-10	
November 15	Suriname International: Host: Paramaribo, Suriname; Level: International Series; Format: 32MS/16WS/8MD/4WD/8XD	(Guatemala) Kevin Cordon	(India) Abdul Aditya
November 15	Suriname International: Host: Paramaribo, Suriname; Level: International Series; Format: 32MS/16WS/8MD/4WD/8XD	Score: 23-21, 21-9	
November 15	Suriname International: Host: Paramaribo, Suriname; Level: International Series; Format: 32MS/16WS/8MD/4WD/8XD	(Peru) Christina Aicardi	(Peru) Alejandra Monteverde
November 15	Suriname International: Host: Paramaribo, Suriname; Level: International Series; Format: 32MS/16WS/8MD/4WD/8XD	Score: 21-19, 21-13	
November 15	Suriname International: Host: Paramaribo, Suriname; Level: International Series; Format: 32MS/16WS/8MD/4WD/8XD	(Guatemala) Kevin Cordon (Guatemala) Rodolfo Ramirez	(Suriname) Virgil Soeroredjo (Suriname) Mitchel Wongsodikromo
November 15	Suriname International: Host: Paramaribo, Suriname; Level: International Series; Format: 32MS/16WS/8MD/4WD/8XD	Score: 21-14, 21-16	
November 15	Suriname International: Host: Paramaribo, Suriname; Level: International Series; Format: 32MS/16WS/8MD/4WD/8XD	(Peru) Christina Aicardi (Peru) Alejandra Monteverde	(Suriname) Danielle Melchiot (Suriname) Priscille Tjitrodipo
November 15	Suriname International: Host: Paramaribo, Suriname; Level: International Series; Format: 32MS/16WS/8MD/4WD/8XD	Score: 21-9, 21-13	
November 15	Suriname International: Host: Paramaribo, Suriname; Level: International Series; Format: 32MS/16WS/8MD/4WD/8XD	(Suriname) Virgil Soeroredjo (Suriname) Mireille van Daal	(Suriname) Mitchel Wongsodikromo (Suriname) Priscille Tjitrodipo
November 15	Suriname International: Host: Paramaribo, Suriname; Level: International Series; Format: 32MS/16WS/8MD/4WD/8XD	Score: 21-8, 21-10	
November 22	(South Korea) Korea Masters: Host: Gimcheon, South Korea; Level: Grand Prix; Format: 64MS/32WS/32MD/32WD/32XD	(China) Bao Chunlai	(China) Wang Zhengming
November 22	(South Korea) Korea Masters: Host: Gimcheon, South Korea; Level: Grand Prix; Format: 64MS/32WS/32MD/32WD/32XD	Score: 23-21, 21-18	
November 22	(South Korea) Korea Masters: Host: Gimcheon, South Korea; Level: Grand Prix; Format: 64MS/32WS/32MD/32WD/32XD	(China) Liu Xin	(China) Li Xuerui
November 22	(South Korea) Korea Masters: Host: Gimcheon, South Korea; Level: Grand Prix; Format: 64MS/32WS/32MD/32WD/32XD	Score: 21-9, 21-14	
November 22	(South Korea) Korea Masters: Host: Gimcheon, South Korea; Level: Grand Prix; Format: 64MS/32WS/32MD/32WD/32XD	(South Korea) Jung Jae-sung (South Korea) Lee Yong-dae	(South Korea) Ko Sung-hyun (South Korea) Yoo Yeon-seong
November 22	(South Korea) Korea Masters: Host: Gimcheon, South Korea; Level: Grand Prix; Format: 64MS/32WS/32MD/32WD/32XD	Score: 18-21, 21-18, 27-25	
November 22	(South Korea) Korea Masters: Host: Gimcheon, South Korea; Level: Grand Prix; Format: 64MS/32WS/32MD/32WD/32XD	(South Korea) Jung Kyung-eun (South Korea) Yoo Hyun-young	(South Korea) Eom Hye-won (South Korea) Kim Ha-na
November 22	(South Korea) Korea Masters: Host: Gimcheon, South Korea; Level: Grand Prix; Format: 64MS/32WS/32MD/32WD/32XD	Score: 21-16, 18-21, 21-19	
November 22	(South Korea) Korea Masters: Host: Gimcheon, South Korea; Level: Grand Prix; Format: 64MS/32WS/32MD/32WD/32XD	(South Korea) Yoo Yeon-seong (South Korea) Kim Min-jung	(South Korea) Choi Young-woo (South Korea) Eom Hye-won
November 22	(South Korea) Korea Masters: Host: Gimcheon, South Korea; Level: Grand Prix; Format: 64MS/32WS/32MD/32WD/32XD	Score: 21-15, 21-13	
November 22	(Scotland) Scottish International: Host: Glasgow, Scotland; Level: International Challenge; Format: 64MS/64WS/32MD/32WD/32XD	(India) Anand Pawar	(Finland) Ville Lang
November 22	(Scotland) Scottish International: Host: Glasgow, Scotland; Level: International Challenge; Format: 64MS/64WS/32MD/32WD/32XD	Score: 21-9, 21-10	
November 22	(Scotland) Scottish International: Host: Glasgow, Scotland; Level: International Challenge; Format: 64MS/64WS/32MD/32WD/32XD	(Russia) Tatyana Bibik	(England) Elizabeth Cann
November 22	(Scotland) Scottish International: Host: Glasgow, Scotland; Level: International Challenge; Format: 64MS/64WS/32MD/32WD/32XD	Score: 25-23, 21-12	
November 22	(Scotland) Scottish International: Host: Glasgow, Scotland; Level: International Challenge; Format: 64MS/64WS/32MD/32WD/32XD	(England) Marcus Ellis (England) Peter Mills	(England) Chris Adcock (England) Andy Ellis
November 22	(Scotland) Scottish International: Host: Glasgow, Scotland; Level: International Challenge; Format: 64MS/64WS/32MD/32WD/32XD	Score: 21-19, 11-21, 21-15	
November 22	(Scotland) Scottish International: Host: Glasgow, Scotland; Level: International Challenge; Format: 64MS/64WS/32MD/32WD/32XD	(England) Jenny Wallwork (England) Gabrielle White	(England) Mariana Agathangelou (England) Heather Olver
November 22	(Scotland) Scottish International: Host: Glasgow, Scotland; Level: International Challenge; Format: 64MS/64WS/32MD/32WD/32XD	Score: 21-17, 21-17	
November 22	(Scotland) Scottish International: Host: Glasgow, Scotland; Level: International Challenge; Format: 64MS/64WS/32MD/32WD/32XD	(England) Chris Adcock (Scotland) Imogen Bankier	(Germany) Till Zander (Germany) Gitte Koehler
November 22	(Scotland) Scottish International: Host: Glasgow, Scotland; Level: International Challenge; Format: 64MS/64WS/32MD/32WD/32XD	Score: 21-10, 21-12	
November 22	(Mexico) Internacional Mexicano: Host: Mexico City, Mexico; Level: Future Series; Format: 32MS/16WS/8MD/8WD/16XD	(Cuba) Osleni Guerrero	(New Zealand) Bjorn Seguin
November 22	(Mexico) Internacional Mexicano: Host: Mexico City, Mexico; Level: Future Series; Format: 32MS/16WS/8MD/8WD/16XD	Score: 17-21, 21-19, 21-17	
November 22	(Mexico) Internacional Mexicano: Host: Mexico City, Mexico; Level: Future Series; Format: 32MS/16WS/8MD/8WD/16XD	(Mexico) Victoria Montero	(Mexico) Mariana Ugalde
November 22	(Mexico) Internacional Mexicano: Host: Mexico City, Mexico; Level: Future Series; Format: 32MS/16WS/8MD/8WD/16XD	Score: 19-21, 21-7, 21-18	
November 22	(Mexico) Internacional Mexicano: Host: Mexico City, Mexico; Level: Future Series; Format: 32MS/16WS/8MD/8WD/16XD	(Mexico) Andres Lopez (Mexico) Lino Muñoz	(Mexico) Mauricio Casillas (Mexico) Jose Luis Gonzalez
November 22	(Mexico) Internacional Mexicano: Host: Mexico City, Mexico; Level: Future Series; Format: 32MS/16WS/8MD/8WD/16XD	Score: 28-26, 14-21, 21-14	
November 22	(Mexico) Internacional Mexicano: Host: Mexico City, Mexico; Level: Future Series; Format: 32MS/16WS/8MD/8WD/16XD	(Mexico) Cynthia Gonzalez (Mexico) Victoria Montero	(Mexico) Deyanira Angulo (Mexico) Aileen Chiñas
November 22	(Mexico) Internacional Mexicano: Host: Mexico City, Mexico; Level: Future Series; Format: 32MS/16WS/8MD/8WD/16XD	Score: 21-15, 21-13	
November 22	(Mexico) Internacional Mexicano: Host: Mexico City, Mexico; Level: Future Series; Format: 32MS/16WS/8MD/8WD/16XD	(Mexico) Andres Lopez (Mexico) Victoria Montero	(New Zealand) Bjorn Seguin (Mexico) Deyanira Angulo
November 22	(Mexico) Internacional Mexicano: Host: Mexico City, Mexico; Level: Future Series; Format: 32MS/16WS/8MD/8WD/16XD	Score: 21-15, 21-18	
November 22	South Africa International: Host: Pretoria, South Africa; Level: International Series; Format: 64MS/32WS/32MD/16WD/32XD	(Iran) Kaveh Mehrabi	(Turkey) Murat Sen
November 22	South Africa International: Host: Pretoria, South Africa; Level: International Series; Format: 64MS/32WS/32MD/16WD/32XD	Score: 21-9, 21-15	
November 22	South Africa International: Host: Pretoria, South Africa; Level: International Series; Format: 64MS/32WS/32MD/16WD/32XD	(Italy) Agnese Allegrini	(Turkey) Özge Bayrak
November 22	South Africa International: Host: Pretoria, South Africa; Level: International Series; Format: 64MS/32WS/32MD/16WD/32XD	Score: 14-21, 21-11, 21-10	
November 22	South Africa International: Host: Pretoria, South Africa; Level: International Series; Format: 64MS/32WS/32MD/16WD/32XD	(South Africa) Christoffel Dednam (South Africa) Roeloff Dednam	(South Africa) Dorian James (South Africa) Willem Viljoen
November 22	South Africa International: Host: Pretoria, South Africa; Level: International Series; Format: 64MS/32WS/32MD/16WD/32XD	Score: 21-14, 21-18	
November 22	South Africa International: Host: Pretoria, South Africa; Level: International Series; Format: 64MS/32WS/32MD/16WD/32XD	(Turkey) Özge Bayrak (Turkey) Oznur Calliskan	(South Africa) Michelle Edwards (South Africa) Annari Viljoen
November 22	South Africa International: Host: Pretoria, South Africa; Level: International Series; Format: 64MS/32WS/32MD/16WD/32XD	Score: 21-12, 21-15	
November 22	South Africa International: Host: Pretoria, South Africa; Level: International Series; Format: 64MS/32WS/32MD/16WD/32XD	(South Africa) Christoffel Dednam (South Africa) Annari Viljoen	(South Africa) Dorian James (South Africa) Michelle Edwards
November 22	South Africa International: Host: Pretoria, South Africa; Level: International Series; Format: 64MS/32WS/32MD/16WD/32XD	Score: 14-21, 21-10, 21-13	
November 29	Botswana International: Host: Gaborone, Botswana; Level: International Series; Format: 32MS/32WS/16MD/8WD/16XD	(Italy) Giovanni Traina	(South Africa) Willem Viljoen
November 29	Botswana International: Host: Gaborone, Botswana; Level: International Series; Format: 32MS/32WS/16MD/8WD/16XD	Score: 22-20, 19-21, 21-18	
November 29	Botswana International: Host: Gaborone, Botswana; Level: International Series; Format: 32MS/32WS/16MD/8WD/16XD	(Italy) Agnese Allegrini	(South Africa) Stacey Doubell
November 29	Botswana International: Host: Gaborone, Botswana; Level: International Series; Format: 32MS/32WS/16MD/8WD/16XD	Score: 21-10, 21-8	
November 29	Botswana International: Host: Gaborone, Botswana; Level: International Series; Format: 32MS/32WS/16MD/8WD/16XD	(South Africa) Dorian James (South Africa) Willem Viljoen	(South Africa) Enrico James (South Africa) Jacobs Maliekal
November 29	Botswana International: Host: Gaborone, Botswana; Level: International Series; Format: 32MS/32WS/16MD/8WD/16XD	Score: 21-19, 21-10	
November 29	Botswana International: Host: Gaborone, Botswana; Level: International Series; Format: 32MS/32WS/16MD/8WD/16XD	(South Africa) Michelle Edwards (South Africa) Annari Viljoen	(South Africa) Stacey Doubell (South Africa) Jade Morgan
November 29	Botswana International: Host: Gaborone, Botswana; Level: International Series; Format: 32MS/32WS/16MD/8WD/16XD	Score: 21-12, 21-15	
November 29	Botswana International: Host: Gaborone, Botswana; Level: International Series; Format: 32MS/32WS/16MD/8WD/16XD	(South Africa) Dorian James (South Africa) Michelle Edwards	(South Africa) Enrico James (South Africa) Stacey Doubell
November 29	Botswana International: Host: Gaborone, Botswana; Level: International Series; Format: 32MS/32WS/16MD/8WD/16XD	Score: 21-19, 21-11	
November 29	Bahrain International: Host: Manama, Bahrain; Level: International Challenge; Format: 64MS/64WS/32MD/32WD/32XD	(Indonesia) Tommy Sugiarto	(Netherlands) Eric Pang
November 29	Bahrain International: Host: Manama, Bahrain; Level: International Challenge; Format: 64MS/64WS/32MD/32WD/32XD	Score: 21-17, 21-9	
November 29	Bahrain International: Host: Manama, Bahrain; Level: International Challenge; Format: 64MS/64WS/32MD/32WD/32XD	(Greece) Anne Hald-Jensen	(Turkey) Ozge Bayrak
November 29	Bahrain International: Host: Manama, Bahrain; Level: International Challenge; Format: 64MS/64WS/32MD/32WD/32XD	Score: 21-15, 21-8	
November 29	Bahrain International: Host: Manama, Bahrain; Level: International Challenge; Format: 64MS/64WS/32MD/32WD/32XD	(India) Rupesh Kumar (India) Sanave Thomas	(India) Alwin Francis (India) Bennet Antony Anchery
November 29	Bahrain International: Host: Manama, Bahrain; Level: International Challenge; Format: 64MS/64WS/32MD/32WD/32XD	Score: 21-7, 16-21, 21-14	
November 29	Bahrain International: Host: Manama, Bahrain; Level: International Challenge; Format: 64MS/64WS/32MD/32WD/32XD	(Germany) Nicole Grether (Canada) Charmaine Reid	(India) Dhanya Nair (India) Mohita Sahdev
November 29	Bahrain International: Host: Manama, Bahrain; Level: International Challenge; Format: 64MS/64WS/32MD/32WD/32XD	Score: 23-21, 21-11	
November 29	Bahrain International: Host: Manama, Bahrain; Level: International Challenge; Format: 64MS/64WS/32MD/32WD/32XD	(Indonesia) Viki Indra Okvana (Indonesia) Gustiani Megawati	(Poland) Wojciech Szkudlarczyk (Poland) Agnieszka Wojtkowska
November 29	Bahrain International: Host: Manama, Bahrain; Level: International Challenge; Format: 64MS/64WS/32MD/32WD/32XD	Score: 17-21, 21-16, 21-14	
November 29	China Open (Draw): Host: Shanghai, China; Level: Superseries; Format: 32MS/32WS/32MD/32WD/32XD	(China) Chen Long	(China) Bao Chunlai
November 29	China Open (Draw): Host: Shanghai, China; Level: Superseries; Format: 32MS/32WS/32MD/32WD/32XD	Score: 9-21, 21-14, 21-16	
November 29	China Open (Draw): Host: Shanghai, China; Level: Superseries; Format: 32MS/32WS/32MD/32WD/32XD	(China) Jiang Yanjiao	(China) Wang Shixian
November 29	China Open (Draw): Host: Shanghai, China; Level: Superseries; Format: 32MS/32WS/32MD/32WD/32XD	Score: 21-16, 21-19	
November 29	China Open (Draw): Host: Shanghai, China; Level: Superseries; Format: 32MS/32WS/32MD/32WD/32XD	(South Korea) Jung Jae-sung (South Korea) Lee Yong-dae	(China) Chai Biao (China) Zhang Nan
November 29	China Open (Draw): Host: Shanghai, China; Level: Superseries; Format: 32MS/32WS/32MD/32WD/32XD	Score: 21-15, 21-12	
November 29	China Open (Draw): Host: Shanghai, China; Level: Superseries; Format: 32MS/32WS/32MD/32WD/32XD	(China) Cheng Shu (China) Zhao Yunlei	(China) Ma Jin (China) Zhong Qianxin
November 29	China Open (Draw): Host: Shanghai, China; Level: Superseries; Format: 32MS/32WS/32MD/32WD/32XD	Score: Walkover	
November 29	China Open (Draw): Host: Shanghai, China; Level: Superseries; Format: 32MS/32WS/32MD/32WD/32XD	(China) Tao Jiaming (China) Tian Qing	(China) Zhang Nan (China) Zhao Yunlei
November 29	China Open (Draw): Host: Shanghai, China; Level: Superseries; Format: 32MS/32WS/32MD/32WD/32XD	Score: 21-18, 21-17	

=== December ===
Week of	Tournament	Champions	Runners-up
December 1	(Chinese Taipei) Kaohsiung International: Host: Kaohsiung, Chinese Taipei; Level: International Challenge; Format: 64MS/32WS/32MD/32WD/32XD	(Thailand) Pakkawat Vilailak	(Chinese Taipei) Hsu Jen-hao
December 1	(Chinese Taipei) Kaohsiung International: Host: Kaohsiung, Chinese Taipei; Level: International Challenge; Format: 64MS/32WS/32MD/32WD/32XD	Score: 21-10, 21-15	
December 1	(Chinese Taipei) Kaohsiung International: Host: Kaohsiung, Chinese Taipei; Level: International Challenge; Format: 64MS/32WS/32MD/32WD/32XD	(Chinese Taipei) Pai Yu-po	(Chinese Taipei) Chiang Pei-hsin
December 1	(Chinese Taipei) Kaohsiung International: Host: Kaohsiung, Chinese Taipei; Level: International Challenge; Format: 64MS/32WS/32MD/32WD/32XD	Score: 21-19, 21-17	
December 1	(Chinese Taipei) Kaohsiung International: Host: Kaohsiung, Chinese Taipei; Level: International Challenge; Format: 64MS/32WS/32MD/32WD/32XD	(Thailand) Bodin Isara (Thailand) Maneepong Jongjit	(Chinese Taipei) Liao Chao-hsiang (Chinese Taipei) Tsai Chia-hsin
December 1	(Chinese Taipei) Kaohsiung International: Host: Kaohsiung, Chinese Taipei; Level: International Challenge; Format: 64MS/32WS/32MD/32WD/32XD	Score: 21-18, 21-19	
December 1	(Chinese Taipei) Kaohsiung International: Host: Kaohsiung, Chinese Taipei; Level: International Challenge; Format: 64MS/32WS/32MD/32WD/32XD	(Chinese Taipei) Chou Chia-chi (Chinese Taipei) Tsai Pei-ling	(Thailand) Rodjana Chuthabunditkul (Thailand) Wiranpatch Hongchookeat
December 1	(Chinese Taipei) Kaohsiung International: Host: Kaohsiung, Chinese Taipei; Level: International Challenge; Format: 64MS/32WS/32MD/32WD/32XD	Score: 21-11, 21-12	
December 1	(Chinese Taipei) Kaohsiung International: Host: Kaohsiung, Chinese Taipei; Level: International Challenge; Format: 64MS/32WS/32MD/32WD/32XD	(Chinese Taipei) Su Yi-neng (Chinese Taipei) Lai Chia-wen	(Chinese Taipei) Tseng Min-hao (Chinese Taipei) Chang Hsin-yun
December 1	(Chinese Taipei) Kaohsiung International: Host: Kaohsiung, Chinese Taipei; Level: International Challenge; Format: 64MS/32WS/32MD/32WD/32XD	Score: 21-17, 21-8	
December 1	(Wales) Welsh International: Host: Cardiff, Wales; Level: International Series; Format: 32MS/32WS/32MD/32WD/32XD	(Spain) Pablo Abián	(Germany) Sven-Eric Kastens
December 1	(Wales) Welsh International: Host: Cardiff, Wales; Level: International Series; Format: 32MS/32WS/32MD/32WD/32XD	Score: 14-21, 21-17, 21-14	
December 1	(Wales) Welsh International: Host: Cardiff, Wales; Level: International Series; Format: 32MS/32WS/32MD/32WD/32XD	(Malaysia) Anita Raj Kaur	(Indonesia) Atu Rosalina
December 1	(Wales) Welsh International: Host: Cardiff, Wales; Level: International Series; Format: 32MS/32WS/32MD/32WD/32XD	Score: 23-21, 21-15	
December 1	(Wales) Welsh International: Host: Cardiff, Wales; Level: International Series; Format: 32MS/32WS/32MD/32WD/32XD	(Germany) Peter Kasbauer (Germany) Josche Zurwonne	(England) Mark Middleton (England) Ben Stawski
December 1	(Wales) Welsh International: Host: Cardiff, Wales; Level: International Series; Format: 32MS/32WS/32MD/32WD/32XD	Score: 21-19, 21-12	
December 1	(Wales) Welsh International: Host: Cardiff, Wales; Level: International Series; Format: 32MS/32WS/32MD/32WD/32XD	(Malaysia) Joanne Quay Swee Ling (Malaysia) Anita Raj Kaur	(Sweden) Louise Eriksson (Sweden) Amanda Wallin
December 1	(Wales) Welsh International: Host: Cardiff, Wales; Level: International Series; Format: 32MS/32WS/32MD/32WD/32XD	Score: 21-13, 21-11	
December 1	(Wales) Welsh International: Host: Cardiff, Wales; Level: International Series; Format: 32MS/32WS/32MD/32WD/32XD	(Germany) Peter Kasbauer (Germany) Johanna Goliszewski	(Germany) Josche Zurwonne (Germany) Carla Nelte
December 1	(Wales) Welsh International: Host: Cardiff, Wales; Level: International Series; Format: 32MS/32WS/32MD/32WD/32XD	Score: 21-15, 21-13	
December 6	Hong Kong Open (Draw): Host: Wan Chai, Hong Kong; Level: Superseries; Format: 32MS/32WS/32MD/32WD/32XD	(Malaysia) Lee Chong Wei	(Indonesia) Taufik Hidayat
December 6	Hong Kong Open (Draw): Host: Wan Chai, Hong Kong; Level: Superseries; Format: 32MS/32WS/32MD/32WD/32XD	Score: 21-19, 21-9	
December 6	Hong Kong Open (Draw): Host: Wan Chai, Hong Kong; Level: Superseries; Format: 32MS/32WS/32MD/32WD/32XD	(India) Saina Nehwal	(China) Wang Shixian
December 6	Hong Kong Open (Draw): Host: Wan Chai, Hong Kong; Level: Superseries; Format: 32MS/32WS/32MD/32WD/32XD	Score: 15-21, 21-16, 21-17	
December 6	Hong Kong Open (Draw): Host: Wan Chai, Hong Kong; Level: Superseries; Format: 32MS/32WS/32MD/32WD/32XD	(South Korea) Ko Sung-hyun (South Korea) Yoo Yeon-seong	(Indonesia) Markis Kido (Indonesia) Hendra Setiawan
December 6	Hong Kong Open (Draw): Host: Wan Chai, Hong Kong; Level: Superseries; Format: 32MS/32WS/32MD/32WD/32XD	Score: 21-19, 14-21, 23-21	
December 6	Hong Kong Open (Draw): Host: Wan Chai, Hong Kong; Level: Superseries; Format: 32MS/32WS/32MD/32WD/32XD	(China) Wang Xiaoli (China) Yu Yang	(Chinese Taipei) Cheng Wen-hsing (Chinese Taipei) Chien Yu-chin
December 6	Hong Kong Open (Draw): Host: Wan Chai, Hong Kong; Level: Superseries; Format: 32MS/32WS/32MD/32WD/32XD	Score: 21-11, 21-12	
December 6	Hong Kong Open (Draw): Host: Wan Chai, Hong Kong; Level: Superseries; Format: 32MS/32WS/32MD/32WD/32XD	(Denmark) Joachim Fischer Nielsen (Denmark) Christinna Pedersen	(China) Zhang Nan (China) Zhao Yunlei
December 6	Hong Kong Open (Draw): Host: Wan Chai, Hong Kong; Level: Superseries; Format: 32MS/32WS/32MD/32WD/32XD	Score: 22-20, 14-21, 22-20	
December 6	(Republic of Ireland) Irish International: Host: Dublin, Ireland; Level: International Challenge; Format: 32MS/32WS/32MD/32WD/32XD	(Denmark) Hans-Kristian Vittinghus	(Spain) Pablo Abian
December 6	(Republic of Ireland) Irish International: Host: Dublin, Ireland; Level: International Challenge; Format: 32MS/32WS/32MD/32WD/32XD	Score: 21-13, 14-21, 23-21	
December 6	(Republic of Ireland) Irish International: Host: Dublin, Ireland; Level: International Challenge; Format: 32MS/32WS/32MD/32WD/32XD	(Scotland) Susan Egelstaff	(Denmark) Karina Jorgensen
December 6	(Republic of Ireland) Irish International: Host: Dublin, Ireland; Level: International Challenge; Format: 32MS/32WS/32MD/32WD/32XD	Score: 23-21, 21-8	
December 6	(Republic of Ireland) Irish International: Host: Dublin, Ireland; Level: International Challenge; Format: 32MS/32WS/32MD/32WD/32XD	(England) Chris Adcock (England) Andrew Ellis	(England) Anthony Clark (England) Chris Langridge
December 6	(Republic of Ireland) Irish International: Host: Dublin, Ireland; Level: International Challenge; Format: 32MS/32WS/32MD/32WD/32XD	Score: 21-13, 21-16	
December 6	(Republic of Ireland) Irish International: Host: Dublin, Ireland; Level: International Challenge; Format: 32MS/32WS/32MD/32WD/32XD	(Denmark) Maria Helsbol (Denmark) Anne Skelbaek	(England) Mariana Agathangelou (England) Heather Olver
December 6	(Republic of Ireland) Irish International: Host: Dublin, Ireland; Level: International Challenge; Format: 32MS/32WS/32MD/32WD/32XD	Score: 12-21, 21-12, 21-15	
December 6	(Republic of Ireland) Irish International: Host: Dublin, Ireland; Level: International Challenge; Format: 32MS/32WS/32MD/32WD/32XD	(England) Chris Adcock (Scotland) Imogen Bankier	(Denmark) Christian John Skovgaard (Denmark) Britta Andersen
December 6	(Republic of Ireland) Irish International: Host: Dublin, Ireland; Level: International Challenge; Format: 32MS/32WS/32MD/32WD/32XD	Score: 21-13, 21-11	
December 13	(Italy) Italian International: Host: Rome, Italy; Level: International Challenge; Format: 32MS/32WS/32MD/32WD/32XD	(Poland) Przemyslaw Wacha	(Spain) Pablo Abian
December 13	(Italy) Italian International: Host: Rome, Italy; Level: International Challenge; Format: 32MS/32WS/32MD/32WD/32XD	Score: 21-13, 21-16	
December 13	(Italy) Italian International: Host: Rome, Italy; Level: International Challenge; Format: 32MS/32WS/32MD/32WD/32XD	(Germany) Olga Konon	(Spain) Carolina Marin
December 13	(Italy) Italian International: Host: Rome, Italy; Level: International Challenge; Format: 32MS/32WS/32MD/32WD/32XD	Score: 22-20, 21-14	
December 13	(Italy) Italian International: Host: Rome, Italy; Level: International Challenge; Format: 32MS/32WS/32MD/32WD/32XD	(England) Anthony Clark (England) Chris Langridge	(Russia) Vladimir Ivanov (Russia) Ivan Sozonov
December 13	(Italy) Italian International: Host: Rome, Italy; Level: International Challenge; Format: 32MS/32WS/32MD/32WD/32XD	Score: 21-14, 21-19	
December 13	(Italy) Italian International: Host: Rome, Italy; Level: International Challenge; Format: 32MS/32WS/32MD/32WD/32XD	(Netherlands) Selena Piek (Netherlands) Iris Tabeling	(Poland) Malgorzata Kurdelska (Poland) Natalia Pocztowiak
December 13	(Italy) Italian International: Host: Rome, Italy; Level: International Challenge; Format: 32MS/32WS/32MD/32WD/32XD	Score: 21-15, 21-9	
December 13	(Italy) Italian International: Host: Rome, Italy; Level: International Challenge; Format: 32MS/32WS/32MD/32WD/32XD	(England) Chris Adcock (Scotland) Imogen Bankier	(Estonia) Gert Kunka (Sweden) Amanda Hogstrom
December 13	(Italy) Italian International: Host: Rome, Italy; Level: International Challenge; Format: 32MS/32WS/32MD/32WD/32XD	Score: 21-14, 21-15	
December 13	(India) Syed Modi International: Host: Hyderabad, India; Level: Grand Prix; Format: 64MS/32WS/32MD/16WD/32XD	(Indonesia) Dionysius Hayom Rumbaka	(Thailand) Suppanyu Avihingsanon
December 13	(India) Syed Modi International: Host: Hyderabad, India; Level: Grand Prix; Format: 64MS/32WS/32MD/16WD/32XD	Score: 14-21, 21-15, 21-12	
December 13	(India) Syed Modi International: Host: Hyderabad, India; Level: Grand Prix; Format: 64MS/32WS/32MD/16WD/32XD	(China) Zhou Hui	(Indonesia) Fransiska Ratnasari
December 13	(India) Syed Modi International: Host: Hyderabad, India; Level: Grand Prix; Format: 64MS/32WS/32MD/16WD/32XD	Score: 21-13, 21-17	
December 13	(India) Syed Modi International: Host: Hyderabad, India; Level: Grand Prix; Format: 64MS/32WS/32MD/16WD/32XD	(Indonesia) Mohammad Ahsan (Indonesia) Bona Septano	(Malaysia) Gan Teik Chai (Malaysia) Tan Bin Shen
December 13	(India) Syed Modi International: Host: Hyderabad, India; Level: Grand Prix; Format: 64MS/32WS/32MD/16WD/32XD	Score: 19-21, 21-15, 21-14	
December 13	(India) Syed Modi International: Host: Hyderabad, India; Level: Grand Prix; Format: 64MS/32WS/32MD/16WD/32XD	(China) Tang Jinhua (China) Xia Huan	(Malaysia) Ng Hui Ern (Malaysia) Ng Hui Lin
December 13	(India) Syed Modi International: Host: Hyderabad, India; Level: Grand Prix; Format: 64MS/32WS/32MD/16WD/32XD	Score: 21-8, 21-19	
December 13	(India) Syed Modi International: Host: Hyderabad, India; Level: Grand Prix; Format: 64MS/32WS/32MD/16WD/32XD	(China) Liu Peixuan (China) Tang Jinhua	(Malaysia) Gan Teik Chai (Malaysia) Ng Hui Lin
December 13	(India) Syed Modi International: Host: Hyderabad, India; Level: Grand Prix; Format: 64MS/32WS/32MD/16WD/32XD	Score: 21-17, 21-17	
December 20	Turkey International: Host: Istanbul, Turkey; Level: International Challenge; Format: 32MS/32WS/32MD/32WD/32XD	(Poland) Przemyslaw Wacha	(Netherlands) Eric Pang
December 20	Turkey International: Host: Istanbul, Turkey; Level: International Challenge; Format: 32MS/32WS/32MD/32WD/32XD	Score: 21-18, 21-17	
December 20	Turkey International: Host: Istanbul, Turkey; Level: International Challenge; Format: 32MS/32WS/32MD/32WD/32XD	(Netherlands) Judith Meulendijks	(Bulgaria) Linda Zechiri
December 20	Turkey International: Host: Istanbul, Turkey; Level: International Challenge; Format: 32MS/32WS/32MD/32WD/32XD	Score: 19-21, 21-18, 21-15	
December 20	Turkey International: Host: Istanbul, Turkey; Level: International Challenge; Format: 32MS/32WS/32MD/32WD/32XD	(Russia) Vladimir Ivanov (Russia) Ivan Sozonov	(Poland) Adam Cwalina (Poland) Michal Logosz
December 20	Turkey International: Host: Istanbul, Turkey; Level: International Challenge; Format: 32MS/32WS/32MD/32WD/32XD	Score: 21-12, 21-18	
December 20	Turkey International: Host: Istanbul, Turkey; Level: International Challenge; Format: 32MS/32WS/32MD/32WD/32XD	(Russia) Anastasiya Chervyakova (Russia) Mariya Korobeinikova	(France) Laura Choinet (France) Audrey Fontaine
December 20	Turkey International: Host: Istanbul, Turkey; Level: International Challenge; Format: 32MS/32WS/32MD/32WD/32XD	Score: 21-15, 21-11	
December 20	Turkey International: Host: Istanbul, Turkey; Level: International Challenge; Format: 32MS/32WS/32MD/32WD/32XD	(Denmark) Mads Pieler Kolding (Denmark) Julie Houmann	(France) Baptiste Careme (France) Laura Choinet
December 20	Turkey International: Host: Istanbul, Turkey; Level: International Challenge; Format: 32MS/32WS/32MD/32WD/32XD	Score: 21-12, 21-18	
December 20	Tata Open India International: Host: Mumbai, India; Level: International Challenge; Format: 32MS/32WS/32MD/16WD/16XD	(Indonesia) Alamsyah Yunus	(Indonesia) Tommy Sugiarto
December 20	Tata Open India International: Host: Mumbai, India; Level: International Challenge; Format: 32MS/32WS/32MD/16WD/16XD	Score: 11-21, 21-13, 21-17	
December 20	Tata Open India International: Host: Mumbai, India; Level: International Challenge; Format: 32MS/32WS/32MD/16WD/16XD	(India) P. C. Thulasi	(Indonesia) Fransisca Ratnasari
December 20	Tata Open India International: Host: Mumbai, India; Level: International Challenge; Format: 32MS/32WS/32MD/16WD/16XD	Score: 21-15, 21-13	
December 20	Tata Open India International: Host: Mumbai, India; Level: International Challenge; Format: 32MS/32WS/32MD/16WD/16XD	(Indonesia) Joko Riyadi (Indonesia) Yoga Ukikasah	(India) Akshay Dewalkar (India) Arun Vishnu
December 20	Tata Open India International: Host: Mumbai, India; Level: International Challenge; Format: 32MS/32WS/32MD/16WD/16XD	Score: 24-22, 21-16	
December 20	Tata Open India International: Host: Mumbai, India; Level: International Challenge; Format: 32MS/32WS/32MD/16WD/16XD	(Thailand) Savitree Amitapai (Thailand) Nessara Somsri	(Thailand) Nitchaon Jindapol (Thailand) Pattharaporn Jindapol
December 20	Tata Open India International: Host: Mumbai, India; Level: International Challenge; Format: 32MS/32WS/32MD/16WD/16XD	Score: 21-6, 21-18	
December 20	Tata Open India International: Host: Mumbai, India; Level: International Challenge; Format: 32MS/32WS/32MD/16WD/16XD	(Thailand) Patipat Chalardchaleam (Thailand) Savitree Amitapai	(India) Arun Vishnu (India) Aparna Balan
December 20	Tata Open India International: Host: Mumbai, India; Level: International Challenge; Format: 32MS/32WS/32MD/16WD/16XD	Score: 21-10, 21-15	
December 27	(Denmark) Copenhagen Masters: Host: Frederiksberg, Copenhagen, Denmark; Level: Invitation; Format: 6MS/4WS/4MD/4XD	(Denmark) Peter Gade	(Thailand) Boonsak Ponsana
December 27	(Denmark) Copenhagen Masters: Host: Frederiksberg, Copenhagen, Denmark; Level: Invitation; Format: 6MS/4WS/4MD/4XD	Score: 21-11, 21-12	
December 27	(Denmark) Copenhagen Masters: Host: Frederiksberg, Copenhagen, Denmark; Level: Invitation; Format: 6MS/4WS/4MD/4XD	(Thailand) Salakjit Ponsana	(Denmark) Tine Baun
December 27	(Denmark) Copenhagen Masters: Host: Frederiksberg, Copenhagen, Denmark; Level: Invitation; Format: 6MS/4WS/4MD/4XD	Score: Walkover	
December 27	(Denmark) Copenhagen Masters: Host: Frederiksberg, Copenhagen, Denmark; Level: Invitation; Format: 6MS/4WS/4MD/4XD	(Denmark) Mads Conrad-Petersen (Denmark) Jonas Rasmussen	(Denmark) Mathias Boe (Denmark) Carsten Mogensen
December 27	(Denmark) Copenhagen Masters: Host: Frederiksberg, Copenhagen, Denmark; Level: Invitation; Format: 6MS/4WS/4MD/4XD	Score: 21-16, 14-21, 25-23	
December 27	(Denmark) Copenhagen Masters: Host: Frederiksberg, Copenhagen, Denmark; Level: Invitation; Format: 6MS/4WS/4MD/4XD	(Denmark) Joachim Fischer Nielsen (Denmark) Christinna Pedersen	(Denmark) Mikkel Delbo Larsen (Denmark) Kamilla Rytter Juhl
December 27	(Denmark) Copenhagen Masters: Host: Frederiksberg, Copenhagen, Denmark; Level: Invitation; Format: 6MS/4WS/4MD/4XD	Score: 21-18, 18-21, 21-15	
