= 2011 Australian Open Grand Prix Gold =

Tournament details
- Dates: 5 – 10 April 2011
- Level: Grand Prix Gold
- Total prize money: US$120,000
- Venue: Melbourne Sports and Aquatic Centre
- Location: Melbourne, Australia

Champions
- Men's singles: (Japan) Sho Sasaki
- Women's singles: (China) Liu Xin
- Men's doubles: (Japan) Hiroyuki Endo (Japan) Kenichi Hayakawa
- Women's doubles: (Japan) Shizuka Matsuo (Japan) Mami Naito
- Mixed doubles: (Thailand) Songphon Anugritayawon (Thailand) Kunchala Voravichitchaikul

The 2011 Australian Open Grand Prix Gold was a badminton tournament which took place at the Melbourne Sports and Aquatic Centre in Melbourne, Australia on 5–10 April 2011 and had a total purse of $120,000. This is for the first time Australian Open was rated as a Grand Prix Gold event, where before in 2009–2010 were a Grand Prix events.

== Men's singles ==
=== Seeds ===
1. (Thailand) Boonsak Ponsana (quarter-finals)
2. (Vietnam) Nguyễn Tiến Minh (quarter-finals)
3. (Hong Kong) Hu Yun (third round)
4. (Indonesia) Alamsyah Yunus (withdrew)
5. (Japan) Kazushi Yamada (third round)
6. (Japan) Sho Sasaki (champion)
7. (France) Brice Leverdez (third round)
8. (Malaysia) Wong Choong Hann (final)
9. (Indonesia) Tommy Sugiarto (semi-finals)
10. (Malaysia) Muhammad Hafiz Hashim (third round)
11. (Hong Kong) Wong Wing Ki (third round)
12. (Indonesia) Sony Dwi Kuncoro (withdrew)
13. (India) Arvind Bhat (third round)
14. (France) Mathieu Lo Ying Ping (third round)
15. (Hong Kong) Chan Yan Kit (semi-finals)
16. (India) R. M. V. Gurusaidutt (first round)

=== Finals ===
Quarterfinals
1	(Thailand) Boonsak Ponsana	19	21	9
9	(Indonesia) Tommy Sugiarto	21	19	21
(Japan) Takuma Ueda	11	12
8	(Malaysia) Wong Choong Hann	21	21
15	(Hong Kong) Chan Yan Kit	21	21
(Thailand) Pisit Poodchalat	12	10
6	(Japan) Sho Sasaki	21	7	21
2	(Vietnam) Nguyễn Tiến Minh	19	21	18

Semifinals
9	(Indonesia) Tommy Sugiarto	16	19
8	(Malaysia) Wong Choong Hann	21	21
15	(Hong Kong) Chan Yan Kit	21	16	11
6	(Japan) Sho Sasaki	13	21	21

Final
8	(Malaysia) Wong Choong Hann	11	21	19
6	(Japan) Sho Sasaki	21	12	21

=== Top half ===
==== Section 1 ====
First Round
1	(Thailand) Boonsak Ponsana	21	22	21
(Chinese Taipei) Lin Yu-hsien	15	24	9
(United States) Sattawat Pongnairat	12	8
(Belgium) Yuhan Tan	21	21
13	(India) Arvind Bhat	21	21
(United States) Nicholas Jinadasa	19	14
(Australia) Jeff Tho	24	21	7
(Iran) Kaveh Mehrabi	26	19	21

Second Round
1	(Thailand) Boonsak Ponsana	21	21
(Belgium) Yuhan Tan	9	7
13	(India) Arvind Bhat	21	21
(Iran) Kaveh Mehrabi	14	16

Third Round
1	(Thailand) Boonsak Ponsana	21	21
13	(India) Arvind Bhat	18	14

==== Section 2 ====
First Round
5	(Japan) Kazushi Yamada	21	21
Q	(Indonesia) Kaizar Bobby Alexander	12	8
(Australia) Luke Chong	17	13
(Brazil) Daniel Paiola	21	21
9	(Indonesia) Tommy Sugiarto	21	21
(India) Aditya Elango	12	5
(New Zealand) James Paterson	10	9
Q	(Czech Republic) Jan Fröhlich	21	21

Second Round
5	(Japan) Kazushi Yamada	21	21
(Brazil) Daniel Paiola	14	3
9	(Indonesia) Tommy Sugiarto	21	21
Q	(Czech Republic) Jan Fröhlich	7	8

Third Round
5	(Japan) Kazushi Yamada	12	10
9	(Indonesia) Tommy Sugiarto	21	21

==== Section 3 ====
First Round
3	(Hong Kong) Hu Yun	21	22
(Indonesia) Shesar Hiren Rhustavito	18	20
(Peru) Rodrigo Pacheco
(China) Chen Yuekun	w	/	o
PFQ	(Australia) Wesley Caulkett	9	12
(Japan) Takuma Ueda	21	21
(Chinese Taipei) Hsu Jen-hao	21	21
(New Zealand) Joe Wu	14	11

Second Round
3	(Hong Kong) Hu Yun	23	19	21
(China) Chen Yuekun	21	21	15
(Japan) Takuma Ueda	21	21
(Chinese Taipei) Hsu Jen-hao	19	19

Third Round
3	(Hong Kong) Hu Yun	14	20
(Japan) Takuma Ueda	21	22

==== Section 4 ====
First Round
8	(Malaysia) Wong Choong Hann	21	21
Q	(Australia) Ashwant Gobinathan	6	10
(Japan) Yuichi Ikeda	21	21
Q	(Australia) Hung Pham	6	16
14	(France) Mathieu Lo Ying Ping	21	21
(Indonesia) Adnan Fauzi	15	12
(Iraq) Yara Azad	21	21
(New Zealand) James Eunson	18	15

Second Round
8	(Malaysia) Wong Choong Hann	21	21
(Japan) Yuichi Ikeda	19	16
14	(France) Mathieu Lo Ying Ping	21	21
(Iraq) Yara Azad	10	12

Third Round
8	(Malaysia) Wong Choong Hann	13	21	21
14	(France) Mathieu Lo Ying Ping	21	18	14

=== Bottom half ===
==== Section 1 ====
First Round
(Australia) Chad Whitehead	12	11
(United States) Hock Lai Lee	21	21
Q	(India) Eshan Naqvi	7	8
15	(Hong Kong) Chan Yan Kit	21	21
Q	(Australia) Hu-Wen Chew	19	11
(New Zealand) Michael Fowke	21	21
(Switzerland) Anthony Dumartheray	13	12
7	(France) Brice Leverdez	21	21

Second Round
(United States) Hock Lai Lee	18	21	7
15	(Hong Kong) Chan Yan Kit	21	19	21
(New Zealand) Michael Fowke	12	8
7	(France) Brice Leverdez	21	21

Third Round
15	(Hong Kong) Chan Yan Kit	21	21
7	(France) Brice Leverdez	13	9

==== Section 2 ====
First Round
(Norway) Marius Myhre	19	17
(Malaysia) Chiang Jiann Shiarng	21	21
(Australia) Nelson Oon	15	13
11	(Hong Kong) Wong Wing Ki	21	21
(Brazil) Hugo Arthuso	8	12
(Thailand) Pisit Poodchalat	21	21
(Singapore) Alton Chew	21	21
PFQ	(Czech Republic) Zdeněk Sváta	17	19

Second Round
(Malaysia) Chiang Jiann Shiarng	21	13	13
11	(Hong Kong) Wong Wing Ki	19	21	21
(Thailand) Pisit Poodchalat	21	21
(Singapore) Alton Chew	13	11

Third Round
11	(Hong Kong) Wong Wing Ki	21	17	19
(Thailand) Pisit Poodchalat	14	21	21

==== Section 3 ====
First Round
(United States) Bjorn Seguin	17	14
(Indonesia) Andre Kurniawan Tedjono	21	21
(Japan) Kazuteru Kozai	19	13
10	(Malaysia) Muhammad Hafiz Hashim	21	21
(Mexico) Lino Muñoz	21	21
(Scotland) Alistair Casey	18	13
Q	(Australia) Michael Fariman	7	9
6	(Japan) Sho Sasaki	21	21

Second Round
(Indonesia) Andre Kurniawan Tedjono	15	21	9
10	(Malaysia) Muhammad Hafiz Hashim	21	17	21
(Mexico) Lino Muñoz	11	12
6	(Japan) Sho Sasaki	21	21

Third Round
10	(Malaysia) Muhammad Hafiz Hashim	17	11
6	(Japan) Sho Sasaki	21	21

==== Section 4 ====
First Round
(Iran) Soroush Eskandari	9	19
(Malaysia) Zulfadli Zulkiffli	21	21
(China) Lü Yi	21	21
16	(India) R. M. V. Gurusaidutt	11	18
(Chinese Taipei) Lin Yu-jui	21	21
(United States) Daniel Gouw	13	8
(Malaysia) Yogendran Khrishnan	16	13
2	(Vietnam) Nguyễn Tiến Minh	21	21

Second Round
(Malaysia) Zulfadli Zulkiffli	16	21	12^{r}
(China) Lü Yi	21	12	14
(Chinese Taipei) Lin Yu-jui	8	16
2	(Vietnam) Nguyễn Tiến Minh	21	21

Third Round
(China) Lü Yi	21	16	10
2	(Vietnam) Nguyễn Tiến Minh	16	21	21

== Women's singles ==
=== Seeds ===
1. (China) Liu Xin (champion)
2. (Hong Kong) Yip Pui Yin (first round)
3. (Thailand) Salakjit Ponsana (first round)
4. (Chinese Taipei) Tai Tzu-ying (quarter-finals)
5. (Japan) Ai Goto (first round)
6. (Thailand) Porntip Buranaprasertsuk (final)
7. (Thailand) Ratchanok Intanon (semi-finals)
8. (Japan) Sayaka Sato (quarter-finals)

=== Finals ===
Semifinals
1	(China) Liu Xin	15	22	21
7	(Thailand) Ratchanok Intanon	21	20	12
6	(Thailand) Porntip Buranaprasertsuk	14	22	21
PFQ	(China) Wang Lin	21	20	17

Final
1	(China) Liu Xin	21	21
6	(Thailand) Porntip Buranaprasertsuk	14	9

== Men's doubles ==
=== Seeds ===
1. (Japan) Hirokatsu Hashimoto / Noriyasu Hirata (semi-finals)
2. (Indonesia) Hendra Aprida Gunawan / Alvent Yulianto (semi-finals)
3. (Malaysia) Gan Teik Chai / Tan Bin Shen (quarter-finals)
4. (Japan) Naoki Kawamae / Shōji Satō (final)
5. (Japan) Hiroyuki Endo / Kenichi Hayakawa (champions)
6. (Thailand) Songphon Anugritayawon / Sudket Prapakamol (second round)
7. (Japan) Yoshiteru Hirobe / Kenta Kazuno (first round)
8. (Chinese Taipei) Chen Chung-jen / Lin Yen-jui (quarter-finals)

=== Finals ===
Semifinals
1	(Japan) Hirokatsu Hashimoto (Japan) Noriyasu Hirata	19	21	7
5	(Japan) Hiroyuki Endo (Japan) Kenichi Hayakawa	21	18	21
4	(Japan) Naoki Kawamae (Japan) Shōji Satō	14	21	21
2	(Indonesia) Alvent Yulianto Chandra (Indonesia) Hendra Aprida Gunawan	21	8	12

Final
5	(Japan) Hiroyuki Endo (Japan) Kenichi Hayakawa	21	21
4	(Japan) Naoki Kawamae (Japan) Shōji Satō	17	18

== Women's doubles ==
=== Seeds ===
1. (Japan) Mizuki Fujii / Reika Kakiiwa (quarter-finals)
2. (Thailand) Duanganong Aroonkesorn / Kunchala Voravichitchaikul (second round)
3. (Singapore) Shinta Mulia Sari / Yao Lei (quarter-finals)
4. (Japan) Shizuka Matsuo / Mami Naito (champions)

=== Finals ===
Semifinals
(Malaysia) Chin Eei Hui (Malaysia) Wong Pei Tty	25	21
(Hong Kong) Poon Lok Yan (Hong Kong) Tse Ying Suet	23	18
4	(Japan) Shizuka Matsuo (Japan) Mami Naito	21	21
(China) Ou Dongni (China) Xiong Rui	19	14

Final
(Malaysia) Chin Eei Hui (Malaysia) Wong Pei Tty	18	11
4	(Japan) Shizuka Matsuo (Japan) Mami Naito	21	21

== Mixed doubles ==
=== Seeds ===
1. (Thailand) Sudket Prapakamol / Saralee Thoungthongkam (semi-finals)
2. (Thailand) Songphon Anugritayawon / Kunchala Voravichitchaikul (champions)
3. (Japan) Shintaro Ikeda / Reiko Shiota (semi-finals)
4. (Hong Kong) Wong Wai Hong / Chau Hoi Wah (quarter-finals)
5. (Japan) Hirokatsu Hashimoto / Mizuki Fujii (final)
6. (Indonesia) Nova Widianto / Vita Marissa (quarter-finals)
7. (Australia) Raj Veeran / Renuga Veeran (quarter-finals)
8. (United States) Hock Lai Lee / Priscilla Lun (second round)

=== Finals ===
Semifinals
1	(Thailand) Sudket Prapakamol (Thailand) Saralee Thoungthongkam	21	19	12
5	(Japan) Hirokatsu Hashimoto (Japan) Mizuki Fujii	10	21	21
3	(Japan) Shintaro Ikeda (Japan) Reiko Shiota	12	20
2	(Thailand) Songphon Anugritayawon (Thailand) Kunchala Voravichitchaikul	21	22

Final
5	(Japan) Hirokatsu Hashimoto (Japan) Mizuki Fujii	15	9
2	(Thailand) Songphon Anugritayawon (Thailand) Kunchala Voravichitchaikul	21	21

Preceded by Swiss Open	BWF Grand Prix Gold and Grand Prix; 2011 season	Succeeded by Malaysia Open
