= 2012 Canada Open Grand Prix =

Tournament details
- Dates: July 10, 2012 - July 15, 2012
- Total prize money: US$50,000
- Venue: Richmond Olympic Oval
- Location: Richmond, British Columbia, Canada

The 2012 Canada Open Grand Prix was the eighth grand prix gold and grand prix tournament of the 2012 BWF Grand Prix Gold and Grand Prix. The tournament was held in Richmond Olympic Oval, Richmond, British Columbia, Canada July 10 until July 15, 2012 and had a total purse of $50,000.

== Men's singles ==
=== Seeds ===
1. (Sweden) Henri Hurskainen (semi-final)
2. (Chinese Taipei) Chou Tien-chen (champion)
3. (India) Chetan Anand (quarter-final)
4. (India) Arvind Bhat (semi-final)
5. (Denmark) Joachim Persson (withdrew)
6. (United States) Sattawat Pongnairat (quarter-final)
7. (Japan) Kazumasa Sakai (quarter-final)
8. (Denmark) Rune Ulsing (second round)

=== Finals ===
Quarterfinals
1	(Sweden) Henri Hurskainen	21	21
6	(United States) Sattawat Pongnairat	19	6
3	(India) Chetan Anand	22	15
(Chinese Taipei) Lin Yu-hsien	24	21
7	(Japan) Kazumasa Sakai	21	17	15
4	(India) Arvind Bhat	16	21	21
(Japan) Sho Zeniya	18	21	12
2	(Chinese Taipei) Chou Tien-chen	21	17	21

Semifinals
1	(Sweden) Henri Hurskainen	21	22	14
(Chinese Taipei) Lin Yu-hsien	16	24	21
4	(India) Arvind Bhat	18	15
2	(Chinese Taipei) Chou Tien-chen	21	21

Final
(Chinese Taipei) Lin Yu-hsien	21	16	9
2	(Chinese Taipei) Chou Tien-chen	15	21	21

=== Top half ===
==== Section 1 ====
First Round
1	(Sweden) H Hurskainen
BYE
(United States) C Stensland	21	21
(Canada) A Ko	12	17
(Japan) K Momota	21	21
(Canada) M Chan	15	7
(Canada) N Osborne
(Norway) J Christensen	wo

Second Round
1	(Sweden) H Hurskainen	21	21
(United States) C Stensland	11	8
(Japan) K Momota	21	21
(Canada) N Osborne	8	11

Third Round
1	(Sweden) H Hurskainen	22	23
(Japan) K Momota	20	21

==== Section 2 ====
First Round
6	(United States) S Pongnairat
BYE
(Brazil) L Pinto	13	11
(Canada) B Milroy	21	21
(Canada) D Yuan	21	21
(Canada) B Cui	9	6
(Canada) A D'Souza
(Brazil) F Farias	wo

Second Round
6	(United States) S Pongnairat	21	21
(Canada) B Milroy	16	19
(Canada) D Yuan	14	11
(Canada) A D'Souza	21	21

Third Round
6	(United States) S Pongnairat	21	21
(Canada) A D'Souza	12	13

==== Section 3 ====
First Round
3	(India) C Anand
BYE
(Canada) S Shatenko	21	21
(Trinidad and Tobago) N Bonkowsky	4	6
(Canada) D Good	8	7
(Canada) M Lee	21	21
(Austria) L Wraber	21	21
(Canada) M Hum	6	5

Second Round
3	(India) C Anand	21	21
(Canada) S Shatenko	14	10
(Canada) M Lee	12	14
(Austria) L Wraber	21	21

Third Round
3	(India) C Anand	21	21
(Austria) L Wraber	13	12

==== Section 4 ====
First Round
5	(Denmark) J Persson	wo
(Canada) J Rogers
(Chinese Taipei) Wan C-h	21	21
(Canada) J Chou	9	4
(Canada) C Che	11	12
(Japan) T Watanabe	21	21
(Canada) A Zhuang	6	10
(Chinese Taipei) Lin Y-h	21	21

Second Round
(Canada) J Rogers	15	13
(Chinese Taipei) Wan C-h	21	21
(Japan) T Watanabe	15	19
(Chinese Taipei) Lin Y-h	21	21

Third Round
(Chinese Taipei) Wan C-h	11	12
(Chinese Taipei) Lin Y-h	21	21

=== Bottom half ===
==== Section 5 ====
First Round
(Canada) N Yakura	19	21	19
(Scotland) A Casey	21	18	21
(Canada) S Dunner	15	16
(United States) H Shu	21	21
(United States) Lee HL	21	21
(Canada) P Huang	19	9
(Canada) R MacIntosh	8	3
7	(Japan) K Sakai	21	21

Second Round
(Scotland) A Casey	17	16
(United States) H Shu	21	21
(United States) Lee HL	21	9	16
7	(Japan) K Sakai	17	21	21

Third Round
(United States) H Shu	8	14
7	(Japan) K Sakai	21	21

==== Section 6 ====
First Round
(Canada) K Tamasauskas	21	17	17
(Myanmar) Aung YM	10	21	21
(Canada) M Downton	9	3
(Austria) D Obernosterer	21	21
(Canada) R Le	8	3
(United States) A Amphie	21	21
BYE
4	(India) A Bhat

Second Round
(Myanmar) Aung YM	21	9	12
(Austria) D Obernosterer	16	21	21
(United States) A Amphie	17	14
4	(India) A Bhat	21	21

Third Round
(Austria) D Obernosterer	17	16
4	(India) A Bhat	21	21

==== Section 7 ====
First Round
(India) A Mahajan	21	21
(Canada) K Chan	5	2
(Austria) R Gnedt	21	21
(Canada) J Liu	17	9
(Japan) S Zeniya	21	21
(Canada) T Ma	7	8
BYE
8	(Denmark) R Ulsing

Second Round
(India) A Mahajan	21	21
(Austria) R Gnedt	9	6
(Japan) S Zeniya	21	21
8	(Denmark) R Ulsing	13	12

Third Round
(India) A Mahajan	20	16
(Japan) S Zeniya	22	21

==== Section 8 ====
First Round
(Brazil) R Salles	wo
(Canada) R Chow
(Brazil) L Martinez	12	14
(Canada) B Lin	21	21
(Norway) M Myhre	21	21
(Canada) B Leung	8	13
BYE
2	(Chinese Taipei) Chou T-c

Second Round
(Canada) R Chow	5	9
(Canada) B Lin	21	21
(Norway) M Myhre	8	18
2	(Chinese Taipei) Chou T-c	21	21

Third Round
(Canada) B Lin	3	8
2	(Chinese Taipei) Chou T-c	21	21

== Women's singles ==
=== Seeds ===
1. (Canada) Michelle Li (semi-final)
2. (Chinese Taipei) Pai Hsiao-ma (second round)
3. (Turkey) Neslihan Yigit (withdrew)
4. (New Zealand) Michelle Chan Ky (second round)

=== Finals ===
Semifinals
1	(Canada) Michelle Li	18	19
(Japan) Sayaka Takahashi	21	21
(Japan) Nozomi Okuhara	21	21
(Japan) Shizuka Uchida	10	15

Final
(Japan) Sayaka Takahashi	8	16
(Japan) Nozomi Okuhara	21	21

=== Top half ===
==== Section 1 ====
First Round
1	(Canada) M Li
BYE
(United States) J Subandhi	14	16
(Japan) K Yonao	21	21
(Singapore) Zhang BW
BYE
(Austria) S Prutsch	21	21
(Canada) J Wu	13	15

Second Round
1	(Canada) M Li	21	15	23
(Japan) K Yonao	12	21	21
(Singapore) Zhang BW	21	21
(Austria) S Prutsch	10	17

Quarterfinals
1	(Canada) M Li	21	19	21
(Singapore) Zhang BW	7	21	13

==== Section 2 ====
First Round
3	(Turkey) N Yigit
BYE
(Canada) J Che	13	4
(Japan) S Takahashi	21	21
(Canada) C Tsai
BYE
(Chinese Taipei) Chang Y-l
(Brazil) T Cruz	wo

Second Round
3	(Turkey) N Yigit	wo
(Japan) S Takahashi
(Canada) C Tsai	21	21
(Chinese Taipei) Chang Y-l	19	5

Quarterfinals
(Japan) S Takahashi	21	21
(Canada) C Tsai	9	10

=== Bottom half ===
==== Section 3 ====
First Round
(Turkey) O Bayrak	wo
(Japan) N Okuhara
(Canada) S Khare	7	17
(Japan) N Fukuman	21	21
(Canada) J Ko	21	21
(India) S Jasti	18	12
BYE
4	(New Zealand) M Chan Ky

Second Round
(Japan) N Okuhara	21	21
(Japan) N Fukuman	6	17
(Canada) J Ko	19	21	21
4	(New Zealand) M Chan KY	21	16	18

Quarterfinals
(Japan) N Okuhara	21	21
(Canada) J Ko	10	13

==== Section 4 ====
First Round
(Japan) Y Hashimoto	21	21
(Canada) T Wang	4	8
BYE
(Canada) P Chan
(United States) P Lun	7	8
(Japan) S Uchida	21	21
BYE
2	(Chinese Taipei) Pai H-m

Second Round
(Japan) Y Hashimoto	21	21
(Canada) P Chan	9	6
(Japan) S Uchida	24	21
2	(Chinese Taipei) Pai H-m	22	12

Quarterfinals
(Japan) Y Hashimoto	8	16
(Japan) S Uchida	21	21

== Men's doubles ==
=== Seeds ===
1. (Austria) Juergen Koch / Peter Zauner (semi-final)
2. (United States) Phillip Chew / Sattawat Pongnairat (quarter-final)
3. (Japan) Takeshi Kamura / Keigo Sonoda (champion)
4. (Japan) Hiroyuki Saeki / Ryota Taohata (final)

=== Finals ===
Semifinals
1	(Austria) Juergen Koch (Austria) Peter Zauner	21	12	14
4	(Japan) Hiroyuki Saeki (Japan) Ryota Taohata	19	21	21
3	(Japan) Takeshi Kamura (Japan) Keigo Sonoda	21	21
(Canada) Derrick Ng (Canada) Toby Ng	10	11

Final
4	(Japan) Hiroyuki Saeki (Japan) Ryota Taohata	21	16	19
3	(Japan) Takeshi Kamura (Japan) Keigo Sonoda	12	21	21

=== Top half ===
==== Section 1 ====
First Round
1	(Austria) J Koch (Austria) P Zauner
BYE
(Canada) M Downton (Canada) S Dunner	21	21
(Canada) S Wadsworth (Canada) B Yee	18	17
(Canada) L Chong (Canada) A Liaw
BYE
(Chinese Taipei) Chen C-j (Chinese Taipei) Lu C-b	21	21
(Canada) C Che (Canada) J Liu	8	9

Second Round
1	(Austria) J Koch (Austria) P Zauner	21	21
(Canada) M Downton (Canada) S Dunner	15	12
(Canada) L Chong (Canada) A Liaw	6	8
(Chinese Taipei) Chen C-j (Chinese Taipei) Lu C-b	21	21

Quarterfinals
1	(Austria) J Koch (Austria) P Zauner	24	17	21
(Chinese Taipei) Chen C-j (Chinese Taipei) Lu C-b	22	21	19

==== Section 2 ====
First Round
4	(Japan) H Saeki (Japan) R Taohata
BYE
(Canada) A Liu (Canada) N Yakura
(Brazil) L Pinto (Brazil) F Farias	wo
(Canada) R Chow (Canada) B Leung	12	12
(Canada) B Lin (Canada) D Yao	21	21
(Canada) J Chou (Canada) A Ko
(Norway) J Christensen (Norway) M Myhre	wo

Second Round
4	(Japan) H Saeki (Japan) R Taohata	21	21
(Canada) A Liu (Canada) N Yakura	12	15
(Canada) B Lin (Canada) D Yao	21	21
(Canada) J Chou (Canada) A Ko	11	15

Quarterfinals
4	(Japan) H Saeki (Japan) R Taohata	21	21
(Canada) B Lin (Canada) D Yao	13	15

=== Bottom half ===
==== Section 3 ====
First Round
(Brazil) L Martinez (Brazil) R Salles	wo
(Canada) K Chan (Canada) R Le
(Canada) D Good (Canada) M Hum	8	9
(Canada) P Huang (Indonesia) Sandiarto	21	21
(Canada) M Lee (Canada) N Osborne	10	17
(Austria) D Obernosterer (Austria) R Zirnwald	21	21
BYE
3	(Japan) T Kamura (Japan) K Sonoda

Second Round
(Canada) K Chan (Canada) R Le	3	9
(Canada) P Huang (Indonesia) Sandiarto	21	21
(Austria) D Obernosterer (Austria) R Zirnwald	9	11
3	(Japan) T Kamura (Japan) K Sonoda	21	21

Quarterfinals
(Canada) P Huang (Indonesia) Sandiarto	21	14	8
3	(Japan) T Kamura (Japan) K Sonoda	19	21	21

==== Section 4 ====
First Round
(Chinese Taipei) Lin Y-h (Chinese Taipei) Wan C-h	13	15
(Canada) D Ng (Canada) T Ng	21	21
(Canada) B Mear (Canada) J Wong	17	15
(Canada) K Hunter (Canada) J Rogers	21	21
(Canada) A D'Souza (Canada) S Shatenko	21	21
(Canada) T Ma (Canada) P Tang	9	14
BYE
2	(United States) P Chew (United States) S Pongnairat

Second Round
(Canada) D Ng (Canada) T Ng	21	21
(Canada) K Hunter (Canada) J Rogers	9	13
(Canada) A D'Souza (Canada) S Shatenko	15	16
2	(United States) P Chew (United States) S Pongnairat	21	21

Quarterfinals
(Canada) D Ng (Canada) T Ng	21	24
2	(United States) P Chew (United States) S Pongnairat	12	22

== Women's doubles ==
=== Seeds ===
1. (Japan) Misaki Matsutomo / Ayaka Takahashi (champion)
2. (Canada) Alex Bruce / Michelle Li (quarter-final)

=== Finals ===
Semifinals
1	(Japan) Misaki Matsutomo (Japan) Ayaka Takahashi	21	21
(Japan) Naoko Fukuman (Japan) Kurumi Yonao	18	9
(Indonesia) Komala Dewi (Indonesia) Jenna Gozali	22	12	17
(Japan) Koharu Yonemoto (Japan) Yuriko Miki	20	21	21

Final
1	(Japan) Misaki Matsutomo (Japan) Ayaka Takahashi	21	15	21
(Japan) Koharu Yonemoto (Japan) Yuriko Miki	15	21	12

=== Top half ===
First Round
1	(Japan) M Matsutomo (Japan) A Takahashi
BYE
(Sweden) E Wengberg (Sweden) E Lennartsson	21	21
(Canada) J Che (Canada) Chen RR	9	11
(Canada) Guo SL (Canada) C Trottier-Wong
BYE
(Canada) G Gao (Canada) J Ko	15	19
(Japan) N Fukuman (Japan) K Yonao	21	21

Quarter Final
1	(Japan) M Matsutomo (Japan) A Takahashi	21	21
(Sweden) E Wengberg (Sweden) E Lennartsson	18	13
(Canada) Guo SL (Canada) C Trottier-Wang	1	6
(Japan) N Fukuman (Japan) K Yonao	21	21

Semi Final
1	(Japan) M Matsutomo (Japan) A Takahashi	21	21
(Japan) N Fukuman (Japan) K Yonao	18	9

=== Bottom half ===
First Round
(Turkey) O Bayrak (Turkey) N Yigit	wo
(Canada) T Wang (Canada) J Wu
(Indonesia) K Dewi (Indonesia) J Gozali	21	21
(Canada) S Khare (Canada) Luong H	9	4
(Canada) P Chan (Canada) C Tsai	14	18
(Japan) K Yonemoto (Japan) Y Miki	21	21
BYE
2	(Canada) A Bruce (Canada) M Li

Quarter Final
(Canada) T Wang (Canada) J Wu	6	5
(Indonesia) K Dewi (Indonesia) J Gozali	21	21
(Japan) K Yonemoto (Japan) Y Miki	21	21
2	(Canada) A Bruce (Canada) M Li	17	19

Semi Final
(Indonesia) K Dewi (Indonesia) J Gozali	22	12	17
(Japan) K Yonemoto (Japan) Y Miki	20	21	21

== Mixed doubles ==
=== Seeds ===
1. (Canada) Toby Ng / Grace Gao (semi-final)
2. (Austria) Roman Zirnwald / Elisabeth Baldauf (second round)
3. (United States) Lee Hock Lai / Priscilla Lun (quarter-final)
4. (Japan) Takeshi Kamura / Koharu Yonemoto (final)

=== Finals ===
Semifinals
1	(Canada) Toby Ng (Canada) Grace Gao	19	14
4	(Japan) Takeshi Kamura (Japan) Koharu Yonemoto	21	21
(Chinese Taipei) Chen Chung-jen (Chinese Taipei) Chang Ya-lan	16	17
(Japan) Ryota Taohata (Japan) Ayaka Takahashi	21	21

Final
4	(Japan) Takeshi Kamura (Japan) Koharu Yonemoto	14	16
(Japan) Ryota Taohata (Japan) Ayaka Takahashi	21	21

=== Top half ===
==== Section 1 ====
First Round
1	(Canada) T Ng (Canada) G Gao
BYE
(Chinese Taipei) Lu C-b (Chinese Taipei) Pai H-m
BYE
(United States) A Amphie (Singapore) Zhang BW
BYE
(Canada) D Yao (Canada) T Wang	14	13
(United States) P Chew (United States) J Subandhi	21	21

Second Round
1	(Canada) T Ng (Canada) G Gao	21	18	24
(Chinese Taipei) Lu C-b (Chinese Taipei) Pai H-m	15	21	22
(United States) A Amphie (Singapore) Zhang BW	21	15	21
(United States) P Chew (United States) J Subandhi	17	21	17

Quarterfinals
1	(Canada) T Ng (Canada) G Gao	21	21	21
(United States) A Amphie (Singapore) Zhang BW	14	23	13

==== Section 2 ====
First Round
4	(Japan) T Kamura (Japan) K Yonemoto
BYE
(Canada) A Liu (Canada) C Tsai
BYE
(Canada) M Hum (Canada) Luong H
BYE
(Canada) N Osborne (Canada) J Wu	9	15
(Japan) K Sonoda (Japan) Y Miki	21	21

Second Round
4	(Japan) T Kamura (Japan) K Yonemoto	21	21
(Canada) A Liu (Canada) C Tsai	18	8
(Canada) M Hum (Canada) Luong H	6	2
(Japan) K Sonoda (Japan) Y Miki	21	21

Quarterfinals
4	(Japan) T Kamura (Japan) K Yonemoto	21	16	21
(Japan) K Sonoda (Japan) Y Miki	14	21	16

=== Bottom half ===
==== Section 3 ====
First Round
(Chinese Taipei) Chen C-j (Chinese Taipei) Chang Y-l	14	24	21
(Canada) S Shatenko (Canada) A Bruce	21	22	18
BYE
(Canada) S Wadsworth (Canada) Lee WY
BYE
(Canada) N Choi (Indonesia) J Novita
BYE
3	(United States) Lee HL (United States) P Lun

Second Round
(Chinese Taipei) Chen C-j (Chinese Taipei) Chang Y-l	21	21
(Canada) S Wadsworth (Canada) Lee WY	11	14
(Canada) N Choi (Indonesia) J Novita	21	8	17
3	(United States) Lee HL (United States) P Lun	14	21	21

Quarterfinals
(Chinese Taipei) Chen C-j (Chinese Taipei) Chang Y-l	21	21
3	(United States) Lee HL (United States) P Lun	17	13

==== Section 4 ====
First Round
(Canada) N Yakura (Canada) P Chan
(Brazil) R Salles (Brazil) T Cruz	wo
BYE
(Japan) R Taohata (Japan) A Takahashi
BYE
(Japan) H Saeki (Japan) M Matsutomo
BYE
2	(Austria) R Zirnwald (Austria) E Baldauf

Second Round
(Canada) N Yakura (Canada) P Chan	13	15
(Japan) R Taohata (Japan) A Takahashi	21	21
(Japan) H Saeki (Japan) M Matsutomo	10	21	21
2	(Austria) R Zirnwald (Austria) E Baldauf	21	17	16

Quarterfinals
(Japan) R Taohata (Japan) A Takahashi
(Japan) H Saeki (Japan) M Matsutomo	wo

Preceded by 2012 U.S. Open Grand Prix Gold	BWF Grand Prix Gold and Grand Prix; 2012 season	Succeeded by 2012 Vietnam Open Grand Prix
