= Yuriko Miki =

Japanese badminton player

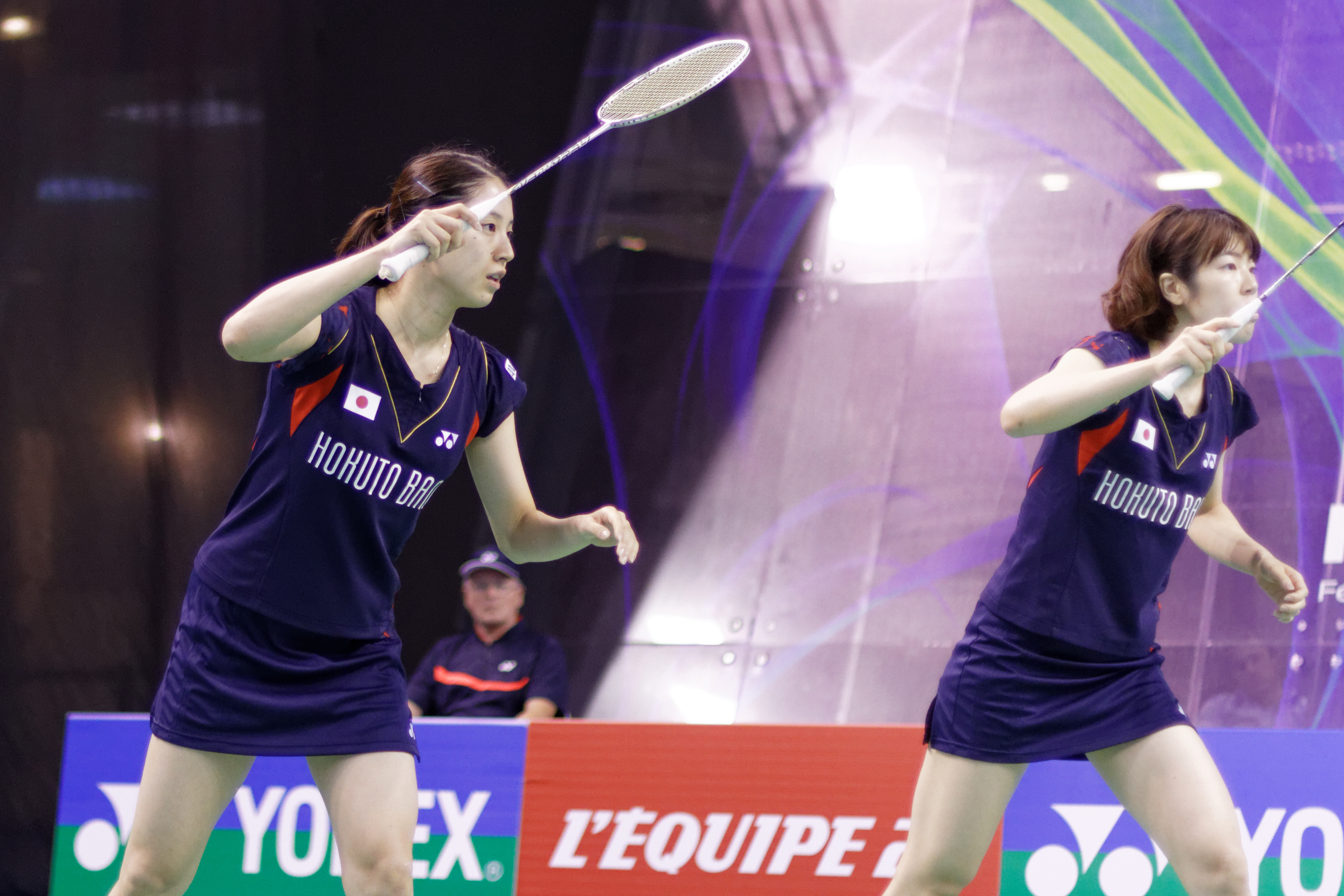

Personal information
- Born: 1 October 1989 (age 37) Saitama Prefecture, Japan
- Height: 1.67 m (5 ft 6 in)

Sport
- Country: Japan
- Sport: Badminton
- Handedness: Right

Women's doubles
- Highest ranking: 18 (28 November 2013)
- BWF profile
Medal record
Women's badminton
Representing Japan
East Asian Games
Silver medal – second place	2013 Tianjin	Women's doubles
Bronze medal – third place	2013 Tianjin	Women's team
Asian Junior Championships
Bronze medal – third place	2006 Kuala Lumpur	Girls' doubles
Bronze medal – third place	2007 Kuala Lumpur	Mixed team

Yuriko Miki (三木 佑里子, Miki Yuriko; born 1 October 1989) is a Japanese retired badminton player from Panasonic badminton team, and in 2013, started to play for the Hokuto Bank. Teamed-up with Koharu Yonemoto, they won the 2011 New Zealand and Austrian International tournament. They also won the Grand Prix title at the 2014 Russia Open tournament.

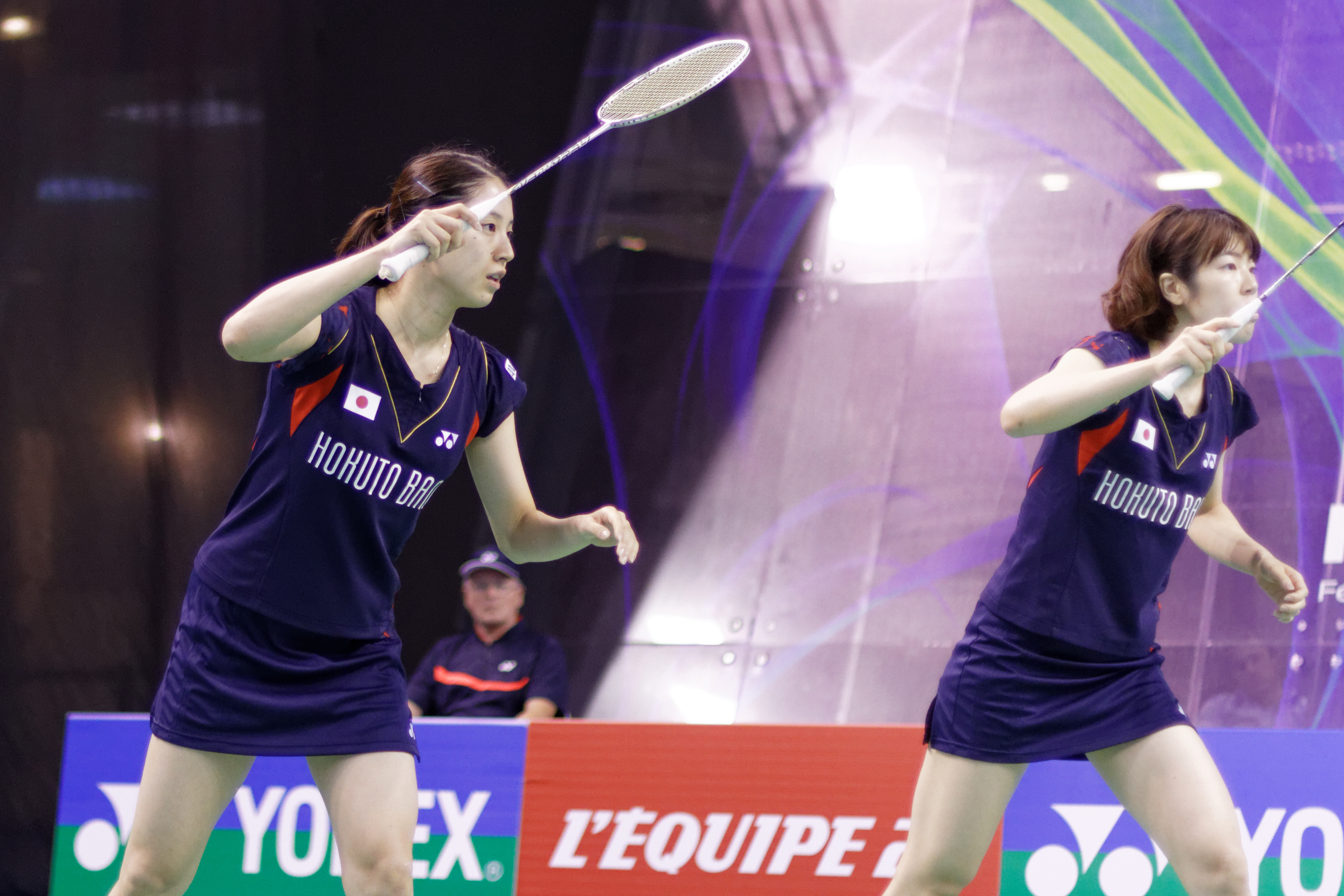
Yuriko Miki (right) and her women's doubles partner Koharu Yonemoto at the 2013 French Super Series.

== Achievements ==
=== East Asian Games ===
Women's doubles
Year	Venue	Partner	Opponent	Score	Result	Ref.
2013	Binhai New Area Dagang Gymnasium; Tianjin, China	(Japan) Koharu Yonemoto	(China) Ou Dongni (China) Tang Yuanting	8–21, 11–21	Silver	

=== Asian Junior Championships ===
Girls' doubles
Year	Venue	Partner	Opponent	Score	Result
2006	Kuala Lumpur Badminton Stadium; Kuala Lumpur, Malaysia	(Japan) Mizuki Fujii	(China) Ma Jin (China) Wang Xiaoli	10–21, 12–21	Bronze

=== BWF Grand Prix ===
The BWF Grand Prix had two levels, the Grand Prix and Grand Prix Gold. It was a series of badminton tournaments sanctioned by the Badminton World Federation (BWF) and played between 2007 and 2017.

Women's doubles
Year	Tournament	Partner	Opponent	Score	Result	Ref.
2010	Russian Open	(Japan) Koharu Yonemoto	(Russia) Valeria Sorokina (Russia) Nina Vislova	18–21, 18–21	(silver) Runner-up	
2012	Canada Open	(Japan) Koharu Yonemoto	(Japan) Misaki Matsutomo (Japan) Ayaka Takahashi	15–21, 21–15, 12–21	(silver) Runner-up	
2013	Thailand Open	(Japan) Koharu Yonemoto	(Indonesia) Nitya Krishinda Maheswari (Indonesia) Greysia Polii	7–21, 13–21	(silver) Runner-up	
2014	Russian Open	(Japan) Koharu Yonemoto	(Japan) Mayu Matsumoto (Japan) Wakana Nagahara	21–17, 21–7	(gold) Winner	

BWF Grand Prix Gold tournament
BWF Grand Prix tournament

=== BWF International Challenge/Series ===
Women's doubles
Year	Tournament	Partner	Opponent	Score	Result	Ref.
2011	Austrian International	(Japan) Koharu Yonemoto	(Denmark) Line Damkjær Kruse (Denmark) Marie Røpke	26–24, 21–15	(gold) Winner	
2011	New Zealand International	(Japan) Koharu Yonemoto	(Hong Kong) Poon Lok Yan (Hong Kong) Tse Ying Suet	16–21, 21–16, 22–20	(gold) Winner	
2011	Osaka International	(Japan) Koharu Yonemoto	(Japan) Miri Ichimaru (Japan) Shiho Tanaka	21–19, 18–21, 14–21	(silver) Runner-up	
2012	Scottish International	(Japan) Koharu Yonemoto	(Japan) Naoko Fukuman (Japan) Kurumi Yonao	21–23, 18–21	(silver) Runner-up	
2013	Osaka International	(Japan) Koharu Yonemoto	(Japan) Rie Eto (Japan) Yu Wakita	10–21, 13–21	(silver) Runner-up	

BWF International Challenge tournament
