= Hiroyuki Saeki =

Japanese badminton player (born 1987)

Personal information
- Born: 8 July 1987 (age 39) Kurashiki, Okayama, Japan
- Height: 1.77 m (5 ft 10 in)
- Weight: 63 kg (139 lb)

Sport
- Country: Japan
- Sport: Badminton
- Handedness: Right

Men's singles & doubles
- Highest ranking: 29 (MD 11 July 2013)
- BWF profile
Medal record
Men's badminton
Representing Japan
Asia Team Championships
Silver medal – second place	2016 Hyderabad	Men's team
East Asian Games
Bronze medal – third place	2013 Tianjin	Men's doubles
Asian Junior Championships
Bronze medal – third place	2005 Jakarta	Boys' singles

Hiroyuki Saeki (佐伯 祐行, Saeki Hiroyuki; born 8 July 1987) is a former Japanese badminton player who affiliated with Unisys team.

== Career ==
Saeki was born in Okayama Prefecture, and in 2005 he won the boys' singles bronze at the Asian Junior Championships. In 2013, he won the men's doubles title at the Austrian International Challenge tournament, and at the same year, he won the men's doubles bronze at the 2013 East Asian Games. He also helps the Japanese men's team to win silver at the 2016 Asia Team Championships. Saeki plays for the Unisys team for seven year, and in March 2017, he announced his retirement.

== Achievements ==
=== East Asian Games ===
Men's doubles
Year	Venue	Partner	Opponent	Score	Result	Ref.
2013	Binhai New Area Dagang Gymnasium; Tianjin, China	(Japan) Ryota Taohata	(Chinese Taipei) Chen Hung-ling (Chinese Taipei) Lu Chia-pin	19–21, 21–15, 17–21	Bronze	

=== Asian Junior Championships ===
Boys' singles
Year	Venue	Opponent	Score	Result
2005	Tennis Indoor Senayan; Jakarta, Indonesia	(South Korea) Hong Ji-hoon	9–15, 12–21	Bronze

=== BWF World Tour ===
The BWF World Tour, announced on 19 March 2017 and implemented in 2018, is a series of elite badminton tournaments, sanctioned by Badminton World Federation (BWF). The BWF World Tour are divided into six levels, namely World Tour Finals, Super 1000, Super 750, Super 500, Super 300 (part of the HSBC World Tour), and the BWF Tour Super 100.

Men's doubles
Year	Tournament	Level	Partner	Opponent	Score	Result	Ref.
2018	Akita Masters	Super 100	(Japan) Hirokatsu Hashimoto	(Indonesia) Akbar Bintang Cahyono (Indonesia) Muhammad Reza Pahlevi Isfahani	16–21, 6–21	(silver) Runner-up	

=== BWF Grand Prix ===
The BWF Grand Prix had two levels, the BWF Grand Prix and Grand Prix Gold. It was a series of badminton tournaments sanctioned by the Badminton World Federation (BWF) which was held from 2007 to 2017.

Men's doubles
Year	Tournament	Partner	Opponent	Score	Result	Ref.
2012	Canada Open	(Japan) Ryota Taohata	(Japan) Takeshi Kamura (Japan) Keigo Sonoda	21–12, 16–21, 19–21	(silver) Runner-up	

BWF Grand Prix tournament

=== BWF International Challenge/Series ===
Men's singles
Year	Tournament	Opponent	Score	Result	Ref.
2010	Polish International	(Spain) Pablo Abián	12–21, 10–21	(silver) Runner-up	
2010	Peru International	(Japan) Yuichi Ikeda	19–21, 19–21	(silver) Runner-up	

Men's doubles
Year	Tournament	Partner	Opponent	Score	Result	Ref.
2010	Peru International	(Japan) Hajime Komiyama	(Canada) Adrian Liu (Canada) Derrick Ng	18–21, 21–10, 20–22	(silver) Runner-up	
2011	Austrian International	(Japan) Ryota Taohata	(England) Anthony Clark (England) Chris Langridge	15–21, 16–21	(silver) Runner-up	
2012	Austrian International	(Japan) Ryota Taohata	(India) K. T. Rupesh Kumar (India) Sanave Thomas	21–23, 20–22	(silver) Runner-up	
2012	Scottish International	(Japan) Ryota Taohata	(Japan) Takeshi Kamura (Japan) Keigo Sonoda	21–16, 11–21, 17–21	(silver) Runner-up	
2013	Austrian International	(Japan) Ryota Taohata	(Japan) Takeshi Kamura (Japan) Keigo Sonoda	21–18, 15–21, 21–18	(gold) Winner	
2018	Osaka International	(Japan) Hirokatsu Hashimoto	(Malaysia) Mohamad Arif Abdul Latif (Malaysia) Nur Mohd Azriyn Ayub	21–19, 15–21, 21–15	(gold) Winner	

BWF International Challenge tournament
