= Deyanira Angulo =

Mexican badminton player (born 1991)

Personal information
- Born: Deyanira Angulo Chiñas; 3 March 1991 (age 35) Naucalpan, Mexico, Mexico
- Height: 1.70 m (5 ft 7 in)
- Weight: 65 kg (143 lb)

Sport
- Country: Mexico
- Sport: Badminton
- BWF profile
Medal record
Women's badminton
Representing Mexico
Pan American Championships
Bronze medal – third place	2009 Guadalajara	Mixed team

Deyanira Angulo Chiñas (born 3 March 1991) is a Mexican professional badminton player.

She was the only badminton player from Mexico to compete at the 2008 Summer Olympics in Beijing, China. She lost the first preliminary round match of the women's singles to Hadia Hosny of Egypt.

== Achievements ==
=== BWF International Challenge/Series ===
Women's singles
Year	Tournament	Opponent	Score	Result
2007	Brazil International	(Spain) Lucia Tavera	9–21, 18–21	(silver) Runner-up
2009	Nouméa International	(New Zealand) Danielle Barry	21–17, 16–21, 21–19	(gold) Winner
2010	Nouméa International	(Italy) Agnese Allegrini	6–21, 10–21	(silver) Runner-up

Women's doubles
Year	Tournament	Partner	Opponent	Score	Result
2009	Nouméa International	(Australia) Louise McKenzie	(New Zealand) Danielle Barry (New Zealand) Donna Haliday	5–21, 11–21	(silver) Runner-up
2010	Internacional Mexicano	(Mexico) Aileen Chiñas	(Mexico) Cynthia González (Mexico) Victoria Montero	15–21, 13–21	(silver) Runner-up

Mixed doubles
Year	Tournament	Partner	Opponent	Score	Result
2010	Nouméa International	(New Zealand) Bjorn Seguin	(New Caledonia) William Jannic (New Caledonia) Cecile Kaddour	21–13, 21–9	(gold) Winner
2010	Miami PanAm International	(New Zealand) Bjorn Seguin	(United States) Hock Lai Lee (United States) Priscilla Lun	13–21, 8–21	(silver) Runner-up
2010	Internacional Mexicano	(New Zealand) Bjorn Seguin	(Mexico) Andrés López (Mexico) Victoria Montero	15–21, 18–21	(silver) Runner-up

BWF International Challenge tournament
BWF International Series tournament
BWF Future Series tournament
