= Megumi Taruno =

Japanese badminton player

Personal information
- Born: 18 May 1988 (age 38) Fukuoka Prefecture, Japan

Sport
- Country: United States
- Sport: Badminton
- Handedness: Left

Women's singles & doubles
- Highest ranking: 32 (WS 11 March 2010); 27 (WD 9 October 2014)
- BWF profile
Medal record
Women's badminton
Representing Japan
East Asian Games
Bronze medal – third place	2013 Tianjin	Women's team

Megumi Taruno (樽野 恵, Taruno Megumi; born 18 May 1988) is a Japanese female badminton player. Taruno was born in Fukuoka Prefecture, and graduated from Ishikawa Prefectural Kanazawa Koyo Kotogakko High School. She started playing badminton at aged 5, and then she joined the NTT East badminton team. In 2007, she became the runner-up at the Indonesia - Surabaya International tournament in the women's singles event. She won first international title at the 2008 Osaka International tournament, then in May 2008 she won the women's doubles event at the Smiling Fish International tournament partnered with Oku Yukina. In February 2016, she retired from the NTT East badminton team, and started her career as a coach in the United States.

== Achievements ==
=== BWF International Challenge/Series ===
Women's singles
Year	Tournament	Opponent	Score	Result	Ref.
2007	Indonesia - Surabaya International	(Chinese Taipei) Chiu Yi-ju	18–21, 14–21	(silver) Runner-up	
2008	Osaka International	(Japan) Mayu Sekiya	21–16, 21–15	(gold) Winner	
2008	Australian International	(Japan) Mizuki Fujii	16–21, 17–21	(silver) Runner-up	
2008	Smiling Fish International	(Thailand) Porntip Buranaprasertsuk	17–21, 23–21, 18–21	(silver) Runner-up	
2011	Osaka International	(Japan) Minatsu Mitani	10–21, 10–21	(silver) Runner-up	

Women's doubles
Year	Tournament	Partner	Opponent	Score	Result	Ref.
2008	Smiling Fish International	(Japan) Oku Yukina	(Japan) Ayaka Takahashi (Japan) Koharu Yonemoto	21–15, 22–20	(gold) Winner	
2013	Austrian International	(Japan) Misato Aratama	(Malaysia) Chow Mei Kuan (Malaysia) Lee Meng Yean	21–14, 22–20	(gold) Winner	

BWF International Challenge tournament
BWF International Series tournament
