= Takeshi Kamura =

Japanese badminton player (born 1990)

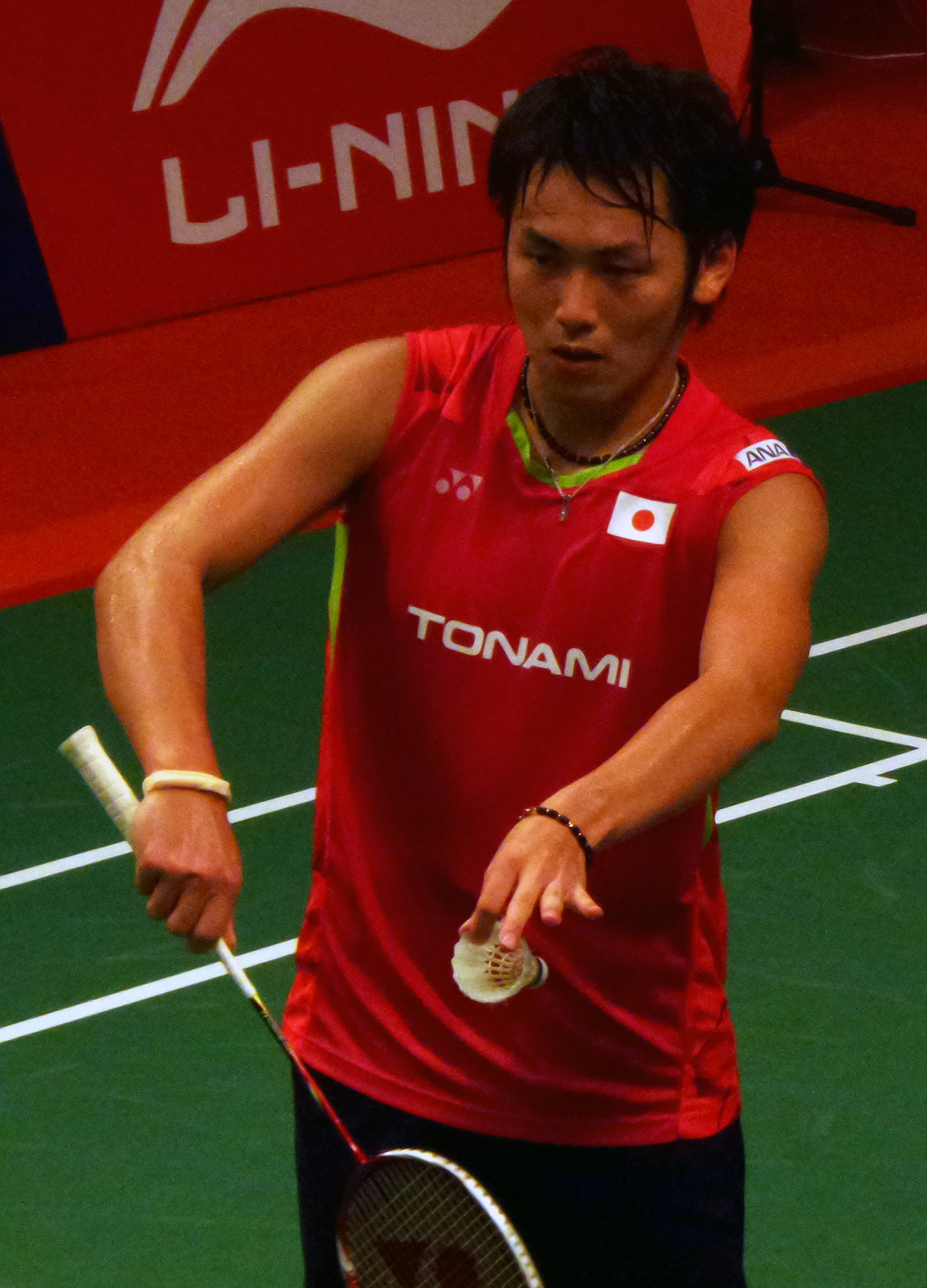

Personal information
- Born: 14 February 1990 (age 36) Saga Prefecture, Japan
- Height: 1.69 m (5 ft 7 in)
- Weight: 66 kg (146 lb)

Sport
- Country: Japan
- Sport: Badminton
- Handedness: Right
- Retired: February 2022

Men's & mixed doubles
- Highest ranking: 2 (MD with Keigo Sonoda 26 January 2017); 37 (XD with Koharu Yonemoto 1 July 2013)
- BWF profile
Medal record
Men's badminton
Representing Japan
World Championships
Silver medal – second place	2018 Nanjing	Men's doubles
Bronze medal – third place	2017 Glasgow	Men's doubles
Sudirman Cup
Silver medal – second place	2015 Dongguan	Mixed team
Silver medal – second place	2019 Nanning	Mixed team
Bronze medal – third place	2017 Gold Coast	Mixed team
Thomas Cup
Gold medal – first place	2014 New Delhi	Men's team
Silver medal – second place	2018 Bangkok	Men's team
Asian Games
Bronze medal – third place	2018 Jakarta–Palembang	Men's team
Asian Championships
Silver medal – second place	2018 Wuhan	Men's doubles
Bronze medal – third place	2016 Wuhan	Men's doubles
Bronze medal – third place	2017 Wuhan	Men's doubles
Bronze medal – third place	2019 Wuhan	Men's doubles
Asia Mixed Team Championships
Gold medal – first place	2017 Ho Chi Minh	Mixed team
Asia Team Championships
Silver medal – second place	2016 Hyderabad	Men's team
Asian Junior Championships
Bronze medal – third place	2007 Kuala Lumpur	Mixed team

Takeshi Kamura (嘉村健士, Kamura Takeshi; born 14 February 1990) is a Japanese former badminton player. He was selected to join the national team in 2013 and retired in 2021. Kamura was part of the national team that won the 2014 Thomas Cup. He captured his first Superseries title at the 2016 Hong Kong Open, and reached a career high of world number 2 in the men's doubles partnered with Keigo Sonoda in January 2017.

Kamura won the silver medal at the 2018 World Championships and a bronze in 2017. In the continental level, he helped the national team to win the 2017 Asia Mixed Team Championships, and he also collected a silver and three bronze medals in the individual men's doubles event. He competed at the 2014 and 2018 Asian Games.

== Early life ==
=== Childhood and junior high school ===
Kamura was born on 14 February 1990 in Saga Prefecture, Japan, and grew up in Karatsu with his parents and a younger brother. Both of his parents played badminton, and he took up the sport at the age of six. He later recalled that he had been hitting shuttlecocks since he was old enough to stand. His childhood training included running in the mountains.

Kamura attended Nagamatsu Elementary School in Karatsu. In the second grade, he joined the local Nanayama Monkeys badminton club, where he was coached by Fumio Enjoji. Enjoji later recalled that Kamura was small and lacked physical strength at the time, but had good technique and maintained a positive attitude during demanding training sessions. As a fifth-grader, Kamura made his first appearance at the All-Japan Elementary School Championships and finished third in boys' doubles, a result he repeated the following year.

He then attended Karatsu Municipal First Junior High School, where he combined badminton with his studies, earning the highest marks in every subject. In 2004, in his third year, he won the Kyushu regional doubles title and qualified for the National Junior High School Championships in both the team and individual events, finishing third in doubles.

=== High school and partnership with Sonoda ===
In the summer of his third year of junior high school, Kamura attended a training session at Yatsushiro Higashi High School in Kumamoto Prefecture. There, he met Keigo Sonoda and played doubles with him for the first time. In their first matches together, the pair defeated older high school players. The two also faced each other in the singles final of the Kumamoto Open, a tournament for elementary and junior high school students held at the Yatsushiro Toyooka Chiken Arena.

Kamura subsequently moved to Kumamoto to attend Yatsushiro Higashi High School, where he and Sonoda formed a regular doubles partnership. To improve his drive shots, Kamura trained with a squash racket, a method he credited with improving his technique. The pair were runners-up in the doubles event at the National High School Selection Tournament in their first year and finished second again in the same event a year later.

In their third year in 2007, the Inter-High Championships were held in Kamura's home prefecture of Saga. Kamura and Sonoda led Yatsushiro Higashi to a runner-up finish in the team event, and Kamura placed third in both the singles and the doubles. He represented Japan at the 2007 World Junior Championships, where he reached the doubles quarter-finals, and won a bronze medal in the mixed team event at the 2007 Asian Junior Championships.

=== University career ===
After graduating from high school, Kamura and Sonoda went their separate ways. Kamura enrolled at the School of Sport Sciences at Waseda University, which he had hoped to attend since his first year of high school, while Sonoda joined the YKK AP corporate team. At Waseda, Kamura played for the university team alongside Takuma Ueda, who was a year his senior. The pair won the doubles title at the All Japan Intercollegiate Championships in Kamura's first year and again in his third year in 2010. In his second year, he entered the Japan Ranking Circuit with Sonoda, finishing runner-up despite having practiced together only once beforehand.

Kamura also began competing in senior international tournaments during this period. In 2009, he and Ueda won the men's doubles title at the Vietnam International, and in 2011 he and Sonoda won the Malaysia International. In mixed doubles with Koharu Yonemoto, he won the Osaka International and finished runner-up at the New Zealand International in the same year.

At the 2009 National Sports Festival in Niigata, Kamura and Sonoda defeated the reigning All Japan champions Noriyasu Hirata and Hirokatsu Hashimoto in the semi-finals. This result boosted their confidence as a partnership, and Sonoda asked Kamura to pair with him permanently. Nevertheless, Kamura stayed at Waseda to complete his studies, graduating in 2012.

== Career ==
=== 2012–2015: Early senior career ===
After graduating from Waseda University in 2012, Kamura joined the Tonami Transportation corporate team and resumed his men's doubles partnership with Keigo Sonoda. The pair won the Osaka International that year, secured their first Grand Prix title at the Canada Open, and claimed the Scottish International title. At the same time, Kamura partnered with Koharu Yonemoto in mixed doubles, finishing as runners-up at both the Osaka International and the Canada Open before winning the mixed doubles title at the All Japan Championships.

Kamura and Sonoda were selected for the Japanese national team in 2013. That year, they finished runners-up at the Austrian International and won their first Grand Prix Gold title at the U.S. Open, beating Liang Jui-wei and Liao Kuan-hao of Chinese Taipei in the final.

In March 2014, they became the first Japanese men's doubles pair to win the German Open after defeating compatriots Hiroyuki Endo and Kenichi Hayakawa in the final. Kamura was a member of the Japanese squad at the Thomas Cup in New Delhi. Japan claimed its first-ever Thomas Cup title by defeating Malaysia 3–2 in the final. Although Kamura and Sonoda lost their doubles match against Goh V Shem and Tan Wee Kiong, Japan ultimately prevailed after Takuma Ueda won the deciding singles match.

At their World Championships debut in Copenhagen, Kamura and Sonoda reached the third round, where they lost to Malaysia's Hoon Thien How and Tan Wee Kiong. Kamura also made his Asian Games debut in Incheon, reaching the men's doubles quarter-finals. Later that year, the pair advanced to the semi-finals of the Hong Kong Open after defeating reigning world champions Ko Sung-hyun and Shin Baek-cheol in the second round, before losing to China's Liu Xiaolong and Qiu Zihan.

In 2015, Kamura helped Japan secure its first silver medal at the Sudirman Cup in Dongguan, China. At the World Championships in Jakarta, he and Sonoda upset fourth seeds Chai Biao and Hong Wei in the second round before losing to Angga Pratama and Ricky Karanda Suwardi in the third round. The pair concluded the year by winning the men's doubles title at the All Japan Championships, defeating three-time defending champions Hiroyuki Endo and Kenichi Hayakawa in the semi-finals and Tonami teammates Takuro Hoki and Yugo Kobayashi in the final.

=== 2016–2017: First Superseries title and world No. 2 ranking ===
Kamura and Sonoda struggled with form during the qualification period for the 2016 Rio Olympics. In February, Kamura helped Japan win silver at the inaugural Asia Team Championships in Hyderabad. Seeking to improve their results, Kamura began closely analysing their matches and taking detailed notes on their opponents' tactics. Their performances subsequently improved, and in April they reached their first BWF Superseries final at the Singapore Open. They defeated China's Li Junhui and Liu Yuchen in the semi-finals, before losing to Fu Haifeng and Zhang Nan in the final. The pair later recalled that reaching the Singapore final gave them confidence that they could compete at Superseries level and helped them play more freely and aggressively. Later that month, they won the bronze medal at the Asian Championships in Wuhan, defeating Indonesia's Marcus Fernaldi Gideon and Kevin Sanjaya Sukamuljo in the quarter-finals before losing to Lee Yong-dae and Yoo Yeon-seong in the semi-finals. Despite their improved results late in the qualification period, Kamura and Sonoda ultimately failed to qualify for the Rio Olympics.

In November 2016, Kamura and Sonoda captured their first BWF Superseries title at the Hong Kong Open, defeating Denmark's Mathias Boe and Carsten Mogensen in straight games. This victory made them only the second Japanese men's doubles pair to win a Superseries tournament. They subsequently finished as runners-up at the Dubai World Superseries Finals, losing to Olympic silver medalists Goh V Shem and Tan Wee Kiong in the final. In December, they defended their All Japan Championships title, while Kamura also won the mixed doubles title alongside Koharu Yonemoto.

The pair reached a career-high world ranking of No. 2 in January 2017. During the year, they helped Japan win the inaugural Asia Mixed Team Championships and take bronze at the Sudirman Cup. In June, they claimed the Australian Open title, defeating Hendra Setiawan and Tan Boon Heong in the final. At the World Championships in Glasgow, Kamura and Sonoda earned their first World Championship medal, securing bronze after a semi-final loss to Indonesia's Mohammad Ahsan and Rian Agung Saputro. They concluded the season by reaching the semi-finals of the Dubai World Superseries Finals after topping their group.

=== 2018: World Championship silver ===
In April 2018, Kamura and Sonoda won the silver medal at the Asian Championships in Wuhan after defeating reigning world champions Liu Cheng and Zhang Nan in the semi-finals. In May, Kamura was part of the Japanese men's team that won the silver medal at the Thomas Cup in Bangkok. The pair then won consecutive BWF World Tour titles in July, capturing the Malaysia Open (Super 750) and the Thailand Open (Super 500) by defeating compatriots Hiroyuki Endo and Yuta Watanabe in both finals.

At the 2018 World Championships in Nanjing, Kamura and Sonoda made history as the first Japanese men's doubles pair to reach a World Championship final. Their run included a quarter-final victory over the world No. 1 pair, Marcus Fernaldi Gideon and Kevin Sanjaya Sukamuljo, in a match that featured a 117-shot rally. They finished as silver medalists after losing to China's Li Junhui and Liu Yuchen in the final. In August, Kamura won a bronze medal with the Japanese men's team at the Asian Games in Jakarta. Later in the season, Kamura and Sonoda finished as runners-up at the Denmark Open and Hong Kong Open, losing both finals to Gideon and Sukamuljo. They ended the year by winning the men's doubles title at the All Japan Championships.

=== 2019–2021: Home Olympics ===
In April 2019, Kamura and Sonoda won the Singapore Open, defeating Indonesia's reigning All England champions Mohammad Ahsan and Hendra Setiawan in the final. Later that month, they won bronze at the Asian Championships in Wuhan, losing to Marcus Fernaldi Gideon and Kevin Sanjaya Sukamuljo in the semi-finals. In May, Kamura helped Japan secure silver at the Sudirman Cup in Nanning. Throughout the year, they also finished as runners-up at the German Open, Malaysia Open, Australian Open, Korea Open, and Fuzhou China Open. Despite these results, their qualification campaign for the Tokyo Olympics suffered setbacks, including defeats to compatriots Takuro Hoki and Yugo Kobayashi at both the Indonesia Open and the World Championships. Kamura later recalled that the defeats left him deeply discouraged as their prospects of qualifying for Tokyo appeared to be slipping away.

Following the suspension of much of the international calendar during the COVID-19 pandemic, Kamura and Sonoda returned to competition at the 2021 All England Open, where they reached the final and finished as runners-up to compatriots Hiroyuki Endo and Yuta Watanabe.

Making their Olympic debut at the delayed 2020 Tokyo Olympics, Kamura and Sonoda advanced to the quarter-finals as runners-up in their group, with their only group-stage defeat coming against China's Li Junhui and Liu Yuchen. They were then eliminated by the Indonesian pair Mohammad Ahsan and Hendra Setiawan, finishing fifth overall.

=== Retirement and coaching career ===
Following the Olympics, Kamura and Sonoda announced their retirement from the Japanese national team in September 2021. They played their final match together at an S/J League tournament in February 2022 at the Yatsushiro Toyooka Chiken Arena in Kumamoto Prefecture, in the same city where they had first partnered as junior high school students, marking the conclusion of their partnership.

In March 2022, Kamura left Tonami Transportation to begin his coaching career, joining the Yonex badminton team as a coach the following month. In 2025, Kamura left the Yonex badminton team. In July 2025, he began working as coach and sparring partner to Yuta Watanabe.

== Achievements ==
=== World Championships ===
Men's doubles
Year	Venue	Partner	Opponent	Score	Result	Ref.
2017	Emirates Arena; Glasgow, Scotland	(Japan) Keigo Sonoda	(Indonesia) Mohammad Ahsan (Indonesia) Rian Agung Saputro	12–21, 15–21	Bronze	
2018	Nanjing Youth Olympic Sports Park; Nanjing, China	(Japan) Keigo Sonoda	(China) Li Junhui (China) Liu Yuchen	12–21, 19–21	Silver	

=== Asian Championships ===
Men's doubles
Year	Venue	Partner	Opponent	Score	Result	Ref.
2016	Wuhan Sports Center Gymnasium; Wuhan, China	(Japan) Keigo Sonoda	(South Korea) Lee Yong-dae (South Korea) Yoo Yeon-seong	17–21, 18–21	Bronze	
2017	Wuhan Sports Center Gymnasium; Wuhan, China	(Japan) Keigo Sonoda	(China) Li Junhui (China) Liu Yuchen	15–21, 21–13, 18–21	Bronze	
2018	Wuhan Sports Center Gymnasium; Wuhan, China	(Japan) Keigo Sonoda	(China) Li Junhui (China) Liu Yuchen	21–11, 10–21, 13–21	Silver	
2019	Wuhan Sports Center Gymnasium; Wuhan, China	(Japan) Keigo Sonoda	(Indonesia) Marcus Fernaldi Gideon (Indonesia) Kevin Sanjaya Sukamuljo	21–15, 17–21, 15–21	Bronze	

=== BWF World Tour (3 titles, 8 runners-up) ===
The BWF World Tour, which was announced on 19 March 2017 and implemented in 2018, is a series of elite badminton tournaments sanctioned by the Badminton World Federation (BWF). The BWF World Tour is divided into levels of World Tour Finals, Super 1000, Super 750, Super 500, Super 300 (part of the HSBC World Tour), and the BWF Tour Super 100.

Men's doubles
Year	Tournament	Level	Partner	Opponent	Score	Result	Ref.
2018	Malaysia Open	Super 750	(Japan) Keigo Sonoda	(Japan) Hiroyuki Endo (Japan) Yuta Watanabe	21–8, 21–10	(gold) Winner	
2018	Thailand Open	Super 500	(Japan) Keigo Sonoda	(Japan) Hiroyuki Endo (Japan) Yuta Watanabe	21–17, 21–19	(gold) Winner	
2018	Denmark Open	Super 750	(Japan) Keigo Sonoda	(Indonesia) Marcus Fernaldi Gideon (Indonesia) Kevin Sanjaya Sukamuljo	15–21, 16–21	(silver) Runner-up	
2018	Hong Kong Open	Super 500	(Japan) Keigo Sonoda	(Indonesia) Marcus Fernaldi Gideon (Indonesia) Kevin Sanjaya Sukamuljo	13–21, 12–21	(silver) Runner-up	
2019	German Open	Super 300	(Japan) Keigo Sonoda	(Japan) Hiroyuki Endo (Japan) Yuta Watanabe	21–15, 11–21, 12–21	(silver) Runner-up	
2019	Malaysia Open	Super 750	(Japan) Keigo Sonoda	(China) Li Junhui (China) Liu Yuchen	12–21, 17–21	(silver) Runner-up	
2019	Singapore Open	Super 500	(Japan) Keigo Sonoda	(Indonesia) Mohammad Ahsan (Indonesia) Hendra Setiawan	21–13, 19–21, 21–17	(gold) Winner	
2019	Australian Open	Super 300	(Japan) Keigo Sonoda	(South Korea) Ko Sung-hyun (South Korea) Shin Baek-Cheol	11–21, 17–21	(silver) Runner-up	
2019	Korea Open	Super 500	(Japan) Keigo Sonoda	(Indonesia) Fajar Alfian (Indonesia) Muhammad Rian Ardianto	16–21, 17–21	(silver) Runner-up	
2019	Fuzhou China Open	Super 750	(Japan) Keigo Sonoda	(Indonesia) Marcus Fernaldi Gideon (Indonesia) Kevin Sanjaya Sukamuljo	17–21, 9–21	(silver) Runner-up	
2021	All England Open	Super 1000	(Japan) Keigo Sonoda	(Japan) Hiroyuki Endo (Japan) Yuta Watanabe	15–21, 21–17, 11–21	(silver) Runner-up	

=== BWF Superseries (2 titles, 2 runners-up) ===
The BWF Superseries, which was launched on 14 December 2006 and implemented in 2007, was a series of elite badminton tournaments, sanctioned by the Badminton World Federation (BWF). BWF Superseries levels were Superseries and Superseries Premier. A season of Superseries consisted of twelve tournaments around the world that had been introduced since 2011. Successful players were invited to the Superseries Finals, which were held at the end of each year.

Men's doubles
Year	Tournament	Partner	Opponent	Score	Result	Ref.
2016	Singapore Open	(Japan) Keigo Sonoda	(China) Fu Haifeng (China) Zhang Nan	11–21, 20–22	(silver) Runner-up	
2016	Hong Kong Open	(Japan) Keigo Sonoda	(Denmark) Mathias Boe (Denmark) Carsten Mogensen	21–19, 21–19	(gold) Winner	
2016	Dubai World Superseries Finals	(Japan) Keigo Sonoda	(Malaysia) Goh V Shem (Malaysia) Tan Wee Kiong	14–21, 19–21	(silver) Runner-up	
2017	Australia Open	(Japan) Keigo Sonoda	(Indonesia) Hendra Setiawan (Malaysia) Tan Boon Heong	21–17, 21–19	(gold) Winner	

BWF Super Series Finals tournament
BWF Super Series tournament

=== BWF Grand Prix (3 titles, 1 runner-up) ===
The BWF Grand Prix had two levels, the Grand Prix and Grand Prix Gold. It was a series of badminton tournaments sanctioned by the Badminton World Federation (BWF) and played between 2007 and 2017.

Men's doubles
Year	Tournament	Partner	Opponent	Score	Result	Ref.
2012	Canada Open	(Japan) Keigo Sonoda	(Japan) Hiroyuki Saeki (Japan) Ryota Taohata	12–21, 21–16, 21–19	(gold) Winner	
2013	U.S. Open	(Japan) Keigo Sonoda	(Chinese Taipei) Liang Jui-wei (Chinese Taipei) Liao Kuan-hao	21–16, 27–25	(gold) Winner	
2014	German Open	(Japan) Keigo Sonoda	(Japan) Hiroyuki Endo (Japan) Kenichi Hayakawa	21–19, 14–21, 21–14	(gold) Winner	

Mixed doubles
Year	Tournament	Partner	Opponent	Score	Result	Ref.
2012	Canada Open	(Japan) Koharu Yonemoto	(Japan) Ryota Taohata (Japan) Ayaka Takahashi	14–21, 16–21	(silver) Runner-up	

BWF Grand Prix Gold tournament
BWF Grand Prix tournament

=== BWF International Challenge/Series (5 titles, 3 runners-up) ===
Men's doubles
Year	Tournament	Partner	Opponent	Score	Result	Ref.
2009	Vietnam International	(Japan) Takuma Ueda	(Malaysia) Chow Pak Chuu (Malaysia) Hong Chieng Hun	21–14, 21–14	(gold) Winner	
2011	Malaysia International	(Japan) Keigo Sonoda	(Chinese Taipei) Chen Chung-jen (Chinese Taipei) Lin Yen-jui	21–13, 21–17	(gold) Winner	
2012	Osaka International	(Japan) Keigo Sonoda	(Indonesia) Marcus Fernaldi Gideon (Indonesia) Agripina Prima Rahmanto Putra	21–17, 21–23, 21–18	(gold) Winner	
2012	Scottish International	(Japan) Keigo Sonoda	(Japan) Hiroyuki Saeki (Japan) Ryota Taohata	16–21, 21–11, 21–17	(gold) Winner	
2013	Austrian International	(Japan) Keigo Sonoda	(Japan) Hiroyuki Saeki (Japan) Ryota Taohata	18–21, 21–15, 18–21	(silver) Runner-up	

Mixed doubles
Year	Tournament	Partner	Opponent	Score	Result	Ref.
2011	New Zealand International	(Japan) Koharu Yonemoto	(Singapore) Danny Bawa Chrisnanta (Singapore) Vanessa Neo	14–21, 13–21	(silver) Runner-up	
2011	Osaka International	(Japan) Koharu Yonemoto	(Japan) Keisuke Kawaguchi (Japan) Shinobu Ogura	21–18, 21–7	(gold) Winner	
2012	Osaka International	(Japan) Koharu Yonemoto	(Indonesia) Riky Widianto (Indonesia) Richi Puspita Dili	15–21, 19–21	(silver) Runner-up	

BWF International Challenge tournament
