= Ryota Taohata =

Japanese badminton player (born 1988)

Personal information
- Born: 21 November 1988 (age 37) Okagaki, Fukuoka, Japan
- Height: 1.84 m (6 ft 0 in)
- Weight: 80 kg (176 lb)

Sport
- Country: Japan
- Sport: Badminton
- Handedness: Right
- Retired: 31 March 2017

Men's & mixed doubles
- Highest ranking: 29 (MD 11 July 2013); 97 (XD 15 December 2016)
- BWF profile
Medal record
Men's badminton
Representing Japan
Asia Team Championships
Silver medal – second place	2016 Hyderabad	Men's team
East Asian Games
Bronze medal – third place	2013 Tianjin	Men's doubles

Ryota Taohata (垰畑 亮太, Taohata Ryōta; born 21 November 1988) is a Japanese badminton player who affiliated with Nihon Unisys team since April 2011. He was a bronze medalist at the 2013 East Asian Games in the men's doubles event, and was part of the Japanese team that won silver medal at the 2016 Asia Team Championships. He won the mixed doubles titles at the 2012 Canada Open and 2014 Russian Open. He retired from the Unisys team on 31 March 2017.

== Achievements ==
=== East Asian Games ===
Men's doubles
Year	Venue	Partner	Opponent	Score	Result	Ref.
2013	Binhai New Area Dagang Gymnasium; Tianjin, China	(Japan) Hiroyuki Saeki	(Chinese Taipei) Chen Hung-ling (Chinese Taipei) Lu Chia-pin	19–21, 21–15, 17–21	Bronze	

=== BWF Grand Prix (2 titles, 2 runners-up) ===
The BWF Grand Prix had two levels, the BWF Grand Prix and Grand Prix Gold. It was a series of badminton tournaments sanctioned by the Badminton World Federation (BWF) which was held from 2007 to 2017.

Men's doubles
Year	Tournament	Partner	Opponent	Score	Result	Ref.
2012	Canada Open	(Japan) Hiroyuki Saeki	(Japan) Takeshi Kamura (Japan) Keigo Sonoda	21–12, 16–21, 19–21	(silver) Runner-up	

Mixed doubles
Year	Tournament	Partner	Opponent	Score	Result	Ref.
2012	Canada Open	(Japan) Ayaka Takahashi	(Japan) Takeshi Kamura (Japan) Koharu Yonemoto	21–14, 21–16	(gold) Winner	
2014	Russian Open	(Japan) Misato Aratama	(Russia) Ivan Sozonov (Russia) Olga Morozova	21–12, 21–10	(gold) Winner	
2016	Chinese Taipei Masters	(Japan) Koharu Yonemoto	(Hong Kong) Tang Chun Man (Hong Kong) Tse Ying Suet	3–11, 7–11, 12–14	(silver) Runner-up	

BWF Grand Prix tournament

=== BWF International Challenge/Series (1 title, 3 runners-up) ===
Men's doubles
Year	Tournament	Partner	Opponent	Score	Result	Ref.
2011	Austrian International	(Japan) Hiroyuki Saeki	(England) Anthony Clark (England) Chris Langridge	15–21, 16–21	(silver) Runner-up	
2012	Austrian International	(Japan) Hiroyuki Saeki	(India) K. T. Rupesh Kumar (India) Sanave Thomas	21–23, 20–22	(silver) Runner-up	
2012	Scottish International	(Japan) Hiroyuki Saeki	(Japan) Takeshi Kamura (Japan) Keigo Sonoda	21–16, 11–21, 17–21	(silver) Runner-up	
2013	Austrian International	(Japan) Hiroyuki Saeki	(Japan) Takeshi Kamura (Japan) Keigo Sonoda	21–18, 15–21, 21–18	(gold) Winner	

BWF International Challenge tournament
