= Badminton at the 2013 East Asian Games =

Badminton tournament

2013 East Asian Games
Tournament details
- Dates: 8 – 13 October
- Edition: 4th
- Nations: 8
- Venue: Binhai New Area Dagang Gymnasium
- Location: Tianjin, China

Badminton at the 2013 East Asian Games was held in Tianjin, China in the month of October. Participant countries included China, Chinese Taipei, Hong Kong, Japan, North Korea, South Korea, Macau, Mongolia and Independent Olympic Athletes. Competitions for five individual disciplines as well as for Men's and Women's team competitions were conducted. China dominated by winning six out of seven possible gold medals while Chinese Taipei won a gold medal in Men's doubles event.

== Medal summary ==
=== Medal table ===
* Host nation (China)

Rank	Nation	Gold	Silver	Bronze	Total
1	China (CHN)*	6	2	0	8
2	Chinese Taipei (TPE)	1	2	3	6
3	Hong Kong (HKG)	0	2	2	4
4	Japan (JPN)	0	1	5	6
5	South Korea (KOR)	0	0	3	3
Totals (5 entries)		7	7	13	27

=== Medalists ===
Discipline	Gold	Silver	Bronze
Men's singles	(China) Du Pengyu	(China) Wang Zhengming	(South Korea) Jeon Hyeok-jin
Men's singles	(China) Du Pengyu	(China) Wang Zhengming	(Japan) Kazumasa Sakai
Women's singles	(China) Han Li	(China) Wang Shixian	(Japan) Akane Yamaguchi
Women's singles	(China) Han Li	(China) Wang Shixian	(Japan) Aya Ohori
Men's doubles	(Chinese Taipei) Lee Sheng-mu (Chinese Taipei) Tsai Chia-hsin	(Chinese Taipei) Chen Hung-ling (Chinese Taipei) Lu Chia-pin	(Hong Kong) Lee Chun Hei (Hong Kong) Ng Ka Long
Men's doubles	(Chinese Taipei) Lee Sheng-mu (Chinese Taipei) Tsai Chia-hsin	(Chinese Taipei) Chen Hung-ling (Chinese Taipei) Lu Chia-pin	(Japan) Hiroyuki Saeki (Japan) Ryota Taohata
Women's doubles	(China) Ou Dongni (China) Tang Yuanting	(Japan) Yuriko Miki (Japan) Koharu Yonemoto	(South Korea) Chae Yoo-jung (South Korea) Kim Ji-won
Women's doubles	(China) Ou Dongni (China) Tang Yuanting	(Japan) Yuriko Miki (Japan) Koharu Yonemoto	(Chinese Taipei) Cheng Wen-hsing (Chinese Taipei) Hsieh Pei-chen
Mixed doubles	(China) Xu Chen (China) Ma Jin	(Hong Kong) Lee Chun Hei (Hong Kong) Chau Hoi Wah	(South Korea) Choi Sol-gyu (South Korea) Chae Yoo-jung
Mixed doubles	(China) Xu Chen (China) Ma Jin	(Hong Kong) Lee Chun Hei (Hong Kong) Chau Hoi Wah	(Chinese Taipei) Lee Sheng-mu (Chinese Taipei) Wang Pei-rong
Men's team	China; Chai Biao; Chen Long; Du Pengyu; Gao Huan; Hong Wei; Liu Xiaolong; Qiu Zihan; Wang Zhengming; Xu Chen	Hong Kong; Hu Yun; Lee Chun Hei; Ng Ka Long; Wong Wai Hong; Wong Wing Ki	Chinese Taipei; Chen Hung-ling; Chou Tien-chen; Hsu Jen-hao; Lee Sheng-mu; Liang Jui-wei; Liao Kuan-hao; Lin Chia-hsuan; Lu Chia-pin; Tsai Chia-hsin; Wang Tzu-wei
Women's team	China; Chen Qingchen; Han Li; He Jiaxin; Ma Jin; Ou Dongni; Sun Yu; Suo Di; Tang Yuanting; Wang Shixian; Zhao Yunlei	Chinese Taipei; Chen Hsiao-huan; Chen Shih-ying; Cheng Wen-hsing; Hsieh Pei-chen; Kuo Yu-wen; Pai Hsiao-ma; Tai Tzu-ying; Tsai Pei-ling; Wang Pei-rong	Hong Kong; Chan Hung Yung; Chan Tsz Ka; Chau Hoi Wah; Cheung Ngan Yi; Cheung Ying Mei; Poon Lok Yan; Tse Ying Suet; Yip Pui Yin
Women's team	China; Chen Qingchen; Han Li; He Jiaxin; Ma Jin; Ou Dongni; Sun Yu; Suo Di; Tang Yuanting; Wang Shixian; Zhao Yunlei	Chinese Taipei; Chen Hsiao-huan; Chen Shih-ying; Cheng Wen-hsing; Hsieh Pei-chen; Kuo Yu-wen; Pai Hsiao-ma; Tai Tzu-ying; Tsai Pei-ling; Wang Pei-rong	Japan; Misato Aratama; Naoko Fukuman; Yui Hashimoto; Kaori Imabeppu; Yuriko Miki; Aya Ohori; Megumi Taruno; Akane Yamaguchi; Koharu Yonemoto

== Results ==
=== Men's singles ===
Semifinal
1	(China) Du Pengyu	21	21
(South Korea) Jeon Hyeok-jin	15	17
(Japan) Kazumasa Sakai	11	17
2	(China) Wang Zhengming	21	21

Final
1	(China) Du Pengyu	22	21
2	(China) Wang Zhengming	20	17

=== Women's singles ===
Semifinal
1	(China) Wang Shixian	19	21	21
(Japan) Akane Yamaguchi	21	19	16
(Japan) Aya Ohori	16	7
(China) Han Li	21	21

Final
1	(China) Wang Shixian	21	17	20
(China) Han Li	14	21	22

=== Men's doubles ===
Semi-finals
(Chinese Taipei) Chen Hung-ling (Chinese Taipei) Lu Chia-pin	21	15	21
(Japan) Hiroyuki Saeki (Japan) Ryota Taohata	19	21	17
(Hong Kong) Lee Chun Hei (Hong Kong) Ng Ka Long	11	19
2	(Chinese Taipei) Lee Sheng-mu (Chinese Taipei) Tsai Chia-hsin	21	21

Final
(Chinese Taipei) Chen Hung-ling (Chinese Taipei) Lu Chia-pin	8	18
2	(Chinese Taipei) Lee Sheng-mu (Chinese Taipei) Tsai Chia-hsin	21	21

=== Women's doubles ===
Semi-finals
(Chinese Taipei) Hsieh Pei-chen (Chinese Taipei) Cheng Wen-hsing	17	18
(China) Ou Dongni (China) Tang Yuanting	21	21
(South Korea) Kim Ji-won (South Korea) Chae Yoo-jung	15	18
2	(Japan) Yuriko Miki (Japan) Koharu Yonemoto	21	21

Final
(China) Ou Dongni (China) Tang Yuanting	21	21
2	(Japan) Yuriko Miki (Japan) Koharu Yonemoto	8	11

=== Mixed doubles ===
Semi-finals
1	(China) Xu Chen (China) Ma Jin	21	21
(South Korea) Choi Sol-gyu (South Korea) Chae Yoo-jung	10	15
(Chinese Taipei) Lee Sheng-mu (Chinese Taipei) Wang Pei-rong	12	15
2	(Hong Kong) Lee Chun Hei (Hong Kong) Chau Hoi Wah	21	21

Final
1	(China) Xu Chen (China) Ma Jin	17	21	21
2	(Hong Kong) Lee Chun Hei (Hong Kong) Chau Hoi Wah	21	13	13
