= Koharu Yonemoto =

Japanese badminton player

Koharu Fujimoto
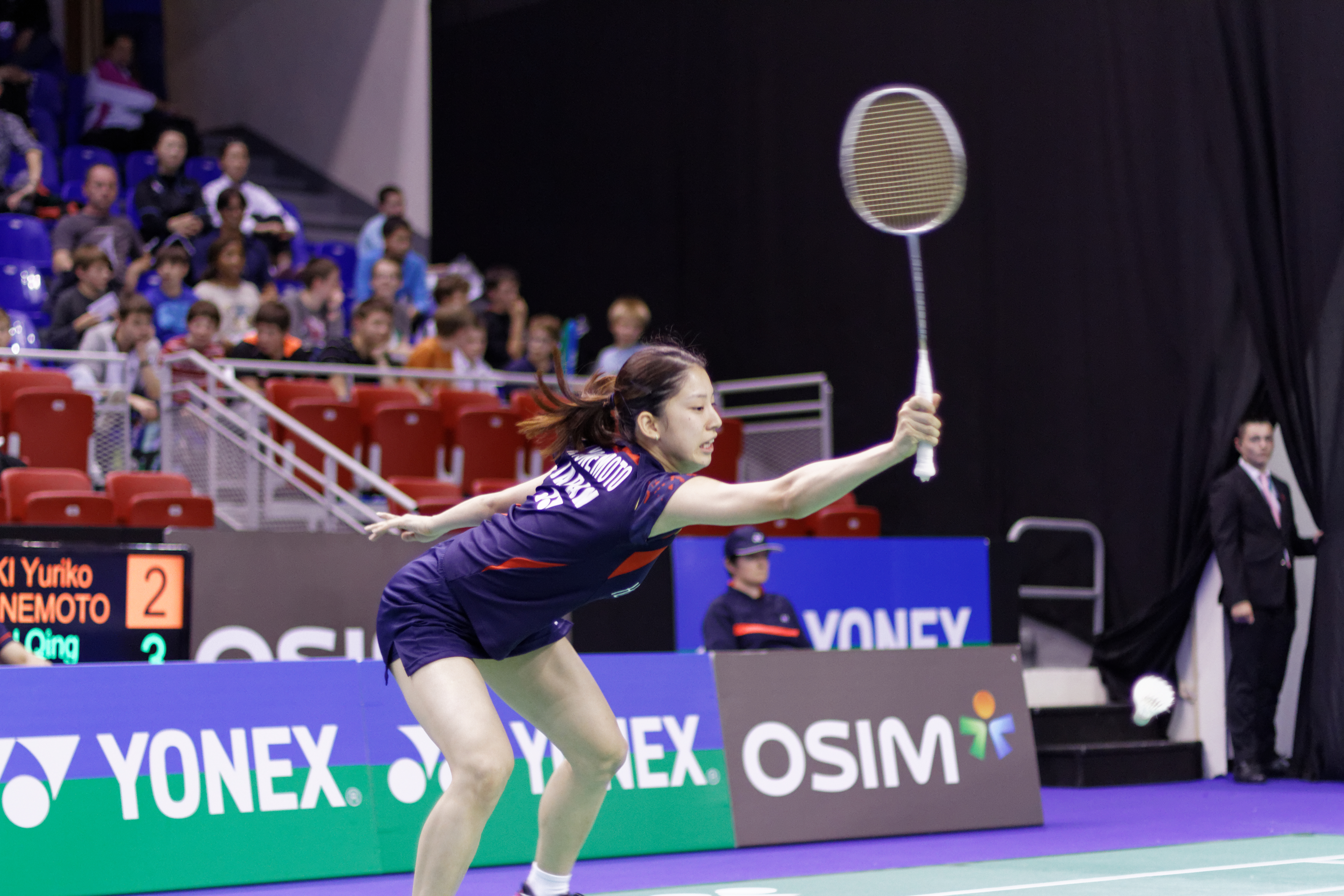

Personal information
- Born: Koharu Yonemoto 米元 小春; 7 December 1990 (age 35) Hiroshima, Japan
- Height: 1.66 m (5 ft 5 in)

Sport
- Country: Japan
- Sport: Badminton
- Handedness: Right
- Retired: 29 January 2021

Women's & mixed doubles
- Highest ranking: 4 (WD with Shiho Tanaka 14 June 2018); 37 (XD with Takeshi Kamura 11 July 2013)
- BWF profile
Medal record
Women's badminton
Representing Japan
World Championships
Bronze medal – third place	2018 Nanjing	Women's doubles
Sudirman Cup
Bronze medal – third place	2017 Gold Coast	Mixed team
Uber Cup
Gold medal – first place	2018 Bangkok	Women's team
Asian Games
Gold medal – first place	2018 Jakarta–Palembang	Women's team
Asia Mixed Team Championships
Gold medal – first place	2017 Ho Chi Minh	Mixed team
Silver medal – second place	2019 Hong Kong	Mixed team
Asia Team Championships
Gold medal – first place	2018 Alor Setar	Women's team
East Asian Games
Silver medal – second place	2013 Tianjin	Women's doubles
Bronze medal – third place	2013 Tianjin	Women's team

Koharu Fujimoto (藤本 小春, Fujimoto Koharu; née Yonemoto) born 7 December 1990 is a retired Japanese badminton player who has been affiliated with Hokuto Bank. She was the women's doubles bronze medalist at the 2018 World Championships, and the silver medalist at the 2013 East Asian Games. She won the year-end tournament Superseries Finals in 2017. Yonemoto was part of Japanese winning team at the 2017 Asia Mixed Team Championships, 2018 Uber Cup, 2018 Asian Games, and at the 2018 Asia Women's Team Championships.

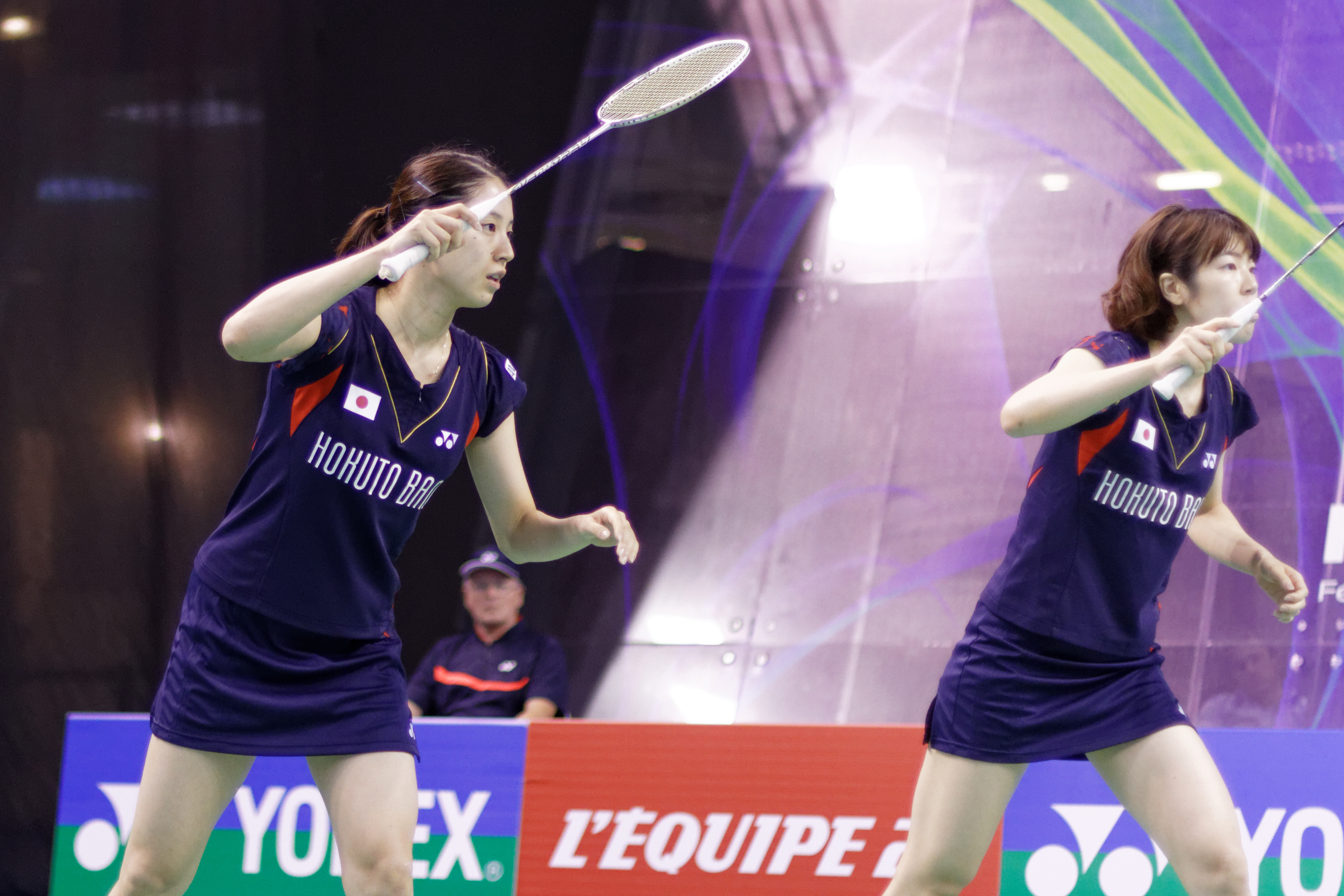
Koharu Yonemoto (left) and her women's doubles partner Yuriko Miki (right) at the 2013 French Super Series

== Career ==
Yonemoto won the 2011 New Zealand and Austrian International tournament partnered with Yuriko Miki. They also won the Grand Prix title at the 2014 Russia Open tournament.

Yonemoto announced her retirement from the badminton tournament at a press conference in the Akita Prefectural office on 29 January 2021, though she was apparently still involved in badminton as a commentator.

== Coaching career ==
Following her retirement, she began coaching under her married name, Koharu Fujimoto. She gained her initial coaching experience working with the corporate badminton team at Toyota Tsusho in Aichi Prefecture. Additionally, she served as a coach for Japan's Junior National Team (U-16). In May 2024, Fujimoto became the new coach for the ACT SAIKYO badminton team.

== Personal life ==
Yonemoto is married to marathon runner Taku Fujimoto and subsequently changed her name to Koharu Fujimoto.

== Achievements ==
=== World Championships ===
Women's doubles
Year	Venue	Partner	Opponent	Score	Result	Ref.
2018	Nanjing Youth Olympic Sports Park; Nanjing, China	(Japan) Shiho Tanaka	(Japan) Yuki Fukushima (Japan) Sayaka Hirota	19–21, 15–21	Bronze	

=== East Asian Games ===
Women's doubles
Year	Venue	Partner	Opponent	Score	Result	Ref.
2013	Binhai New Area Dagang Gymnasium; Tianjin, China	(Japan) Yuriko Miki	(China) Ou Dongni (China) Tang Yuanting	8–21, 11–21	Silver	

=== BWF World Tour (1 title, 1 runner-up) ===
The BWF World Tour, which was announced on 19 March 2017 and implemented in 2018, is a series of elite badminton tournaments sanctioned by the Badminton World Federation (BWF). The BWF World Tours are divided into levels of World Tour Finals, Super 1000, Super 750, Super 500, Super 300 (part of the HSBC World Tour), and the BWF Tour Super 100.

Women's doubles
Year	Tournament	Level	Partner	Opponent	Score	Result	Ref.
2018	Denmark Open	Super 750	(Japan) Shiho Tanaka	(Japan) Yuki Fukushima (Japan) Sayaka Hirota	19–21, 16–21	(silver) Runner-up	
2019	Thailand Open	Super 500	(Japan) Shiho Tanaka	(China) Du Yue (China) Li Yinhui	21–19, 14–21, 21–13	(gold) Winner	

=== BWF Superseries ===
The BWF Superseries, which was launched on 14 December 2006 and implemented in 2007, was a series of elite badminton tournaments, sanctioned by the Badminton World Federation (BWF). BWF Superseries levels were Superseries and Superseries Premier. A season of Superseries consisted of twelve tournaments around the world that had been introduced since 2011. Successful players were invited to the Superseries Finals, which were held at the end of each year.

Women's doubles
Year	Tournament	Partner	Opponent	Score	Result	Ref.
2017	India Open	(Japan) Shiho Tanaka	(Japan) Naoko Fukuman (Japan) Kurumi Yonao	16–21, 21–19, 21–10	(gold) Winner	
2017	Denmark Open	(Japan) Shiho Tanaka	(South Korea) Lee So-hee (South Korea) Shin Seung-chan	13–21, 16–21	(silver) Runner-up	
2017	Dubai World Superseries Finals	(Japan) Shiho Tanaka	(Japan) Yuki Fukushima (Japan) Sayaka Hirota	21–16, 21–15	(gold) Winner	

BWF Super Series Finals tournament
BWF Super Series Premier tournament
BWF Super Series tournament

=== BWF Grand Prix ===
The BWF Grand Prix had two levels, the Grand Prix and Grand Prix Gold. It was a series of badminton tournaments sanctioned by the Badminton World Federation (BWF) and played between 2007 and 2017.

Women's doubles
Year	Tournament	Partner	Opponent	Score	Result	Ref.
2010	Russian Open	(Japan) Yuriko Miki	(Russia) Valeria Sorokina (Russia) Nina Vislova	18–21, 18–21	(silver) Runner-up	
2012	Canada Open	(Japan) Yuriko Miki	(Japan) Misaki Matsutomo (Japan) Ayaka Takahashi	15–21, 21–15, 12–21	(silver) Runner-up	
2013	Thailand Open	(Japan) Yuriko Miki	(Indonesia) Nitya Krishinda Maheswari (Indonesia) Greysia Polii	7–21, 13–21	(silver) Runner-up	
2014	Russian Open	(Japan) Yuriko Miki	(Japan) Mayu Matsumoto (Japan) Wakana Nagahara	21–17, 21–7	(gold) Winner	
2015	Chinese Taipei Masters	(Japan) Shiho Tanaka	(Indonesia) Anggia Shitta Awanda (Indonesia) Ni Ketut Mahadewi Istarani	19–21, 14–21	(silver) Runner-up	
2016	U.S. Open	(Japan) Shiho Tanaka	(Japan) Mayu Matsumoto (Japan) Wakana Nagahara	20–22, 21–15, 21–19	(gold) Winner	
2016	Chinese Taipei Masters	(Japan) Shiho Tanaka	(Japan) Yuki Fukushima (Japan) Sayaka Hirota	10–11, 5–11, 7–11	(silver) Runner-up	

Mixed doubles
Year	Tournament	Partner	Opponent	Score	Result	Ref.
2012	Canada Open	(Japan) Takeshi Kamura	(Japan) Ryota Taohata (Japan) Ayaka Takahashi	14–21, 16–21	(silver) Runner-up	
2016	Chinese Taipei Masters	(Japan) Ryota Taohata	(Hong Kong) Tang Chun Man (Hong Kong) Tse Ying Suet	3–11, 7–11, 12–14	(silver) Runner-up	

BWF Grand Prix Gold tournament
BWF Grand Prix tournament

=== BWF International Challenge/Series ===
Women's doubles
Year	Tournament	Partner	Opponent	Score	Result	Ref.
2008	Smiling Fish International	(Japan) Ayaka Takahashi	(Japan) Megumi Taruno (Japan) Oku Yukina	15–21, 20–22	(silver) Runner-up	
2008	Waikato International	(Japan) Ayaka Takahashi	(New Zealand) Renee Flavell (New Zealand) Rachel Hindley	21–18, 21–19	(gold) Winner	
2008	North Shore City International	(Japan) Ayaka Takahashi	(New Zealand) Renee Flavell (New Zealand) Rachel Hindley	21–9, 21–15	(gold) Winner	
2011	Austrian International	(Japan) Yuriko Miki	(Denmark) Line Damkjær Kruse (Denmark) Marie Røpke	26–24, 21–15	(gold) Winner	
2011	New Zealand International	(Japan) Yuriko Miki	(Hong Kong) Poon Lok Yan (Hong Kong) Tse Ying Suet	16–21, 21–16, 22–20	(gold) Winner	
2011	Osaka International	(Japan) Yuriko Miki	(Japan) Miri Ichimaru (Japan) Shiho Tanaka	21–19, 18–21, 14–21	(silver) Runner-up	
2012	Scottish International	(Japan) Yuriko Miki	(Japan) Naoko Fukuman (Japan) Kurumi Yonao	21–23, 18–21	(silver) Runner-up	
2013	Osaka International	(Japan) Yuriko Miki	(Japan) Rie Eto (Japan) Yu Wakita	10–21, 13–21	(silver) Runner-up	
2016	Vietnam International	(Japan) Shiho Tanaka	(Japan) Yuki Fukushima (Japan) Chiharu Shida	26–28, 15–21	(silver) Runner-up	

Mixed doubles
Year	Tournament	Partner	Opponent	Score	Result	Ref.
2011	New Zealand International	(Japan) Takeshi Kamura	(Singapore) Danny Bawa Chrisnanta (Singapore) Vanessa Neo	14–21, 13–21	(silver) Runner-up	
2011	Osaka International	(Japan) Takeshi Kamura	(Japan) Keisuke Kawaguchi (Japan) Shinobu Ogura	21–18, 21–7	(gold) Winner	
2012	Osaka International	(Japan) Takeshi Kamura	(Indonesia) Riky Widianto (Indonesia) Richi Puspita Dili	15–21, 19–21	(silver) Runner-up	

BWF International Challenge tournament
BWF International Series tournament
