= Bjorn Seguin =

American badminton player (born 1990)

Personal information
- Born: 4 April 1990 (age 36) Los Angeles, California
- Height: 1.87 m (6 ft 2 in)
- Weight: 84 kg (185 lb)

Sport
- Country: United States
- Sport: Badminton

Men's
- Highest ranking: 67 (MS) 16 Jul 2015; 65 (MD) 4 Dec 2014; 72 (XD) 1 Sep 2016
- BWF profile
Medal record
Badminton
Representing United States
Pan Am Championships
Silver medal – second place	2014 Markham	Men's singles
Silver medal – second place	2014 Markham	Mixed team
Bronze medal – third place	2017 Havana	Men's singles

Bjorn Seguin (born 4 April 1990) is an American male badminton player. In 2014, he won silver medals at the Pan Am Badminton Championships in men's singles and mixed team events.

== Achievements ==
=== Pan Am Championships ===
Men's singles
Year	Venue	Opponent	Score	Result
2017	Sports City Coliseum; Havana, Cuba	(Cuba) Osleni Guerrero	14–21, 13–21	Bronze
2014	Markham Pan Am Centre; Markham, Canada	(Cuba) Osleni Guerrero	21–19, 14–21, 13–21	Silver

=== BWF International Challenge/Series ===
Men's singles
Year	Tournament	Opponent	Score	Result
2015	Argentina International	(Mexico) Lino Munoz	21–11, 21–13	(gold) Winner
2015	Colombia International	(Brazil) Daniel Paiola	21–18, 21–18	(gold) Winner
2014	Giraldilla International	(Czech Republic) Jan Frohlich	9–21, 6–21	(silver) Runner-up
2013	Carebaco International	(Italy) Rosario Maddaloni	14–21, 12–21	(silver) Runner-up
2010	Fiji International	(Italy) Rosario Maddaloni	21–18, 19–21, 19–21	(silver) Runner-up
2010	Nouméa International	(Italy) Rosario Maddaloni	21–14, 21–8	(gold) Winner
2010	Internacional Mexicano	(Cuba) Osleni Guerrero	21–17, 19–21, 17–21	(silver) Runner-up
2010	Canterbury International	(New Zealand) James Eunson	21–19, 18–21, 18–21	(silver) Runner-up

Men's doubles
Year	Tournament	Partner	Opponent	Score	Result
2017	Morocco International	(France) Florent Riancho	(Slovakia) Milan Dratva (Slovakia) Matej Hlinican	21–15, 21–17	(gold) Winner
2016	Manhattan Beach International	(United States) Mathew Fogarty	(Indonesia) David Yedija Pohan (Indonesia) Ricky Alverino Sidarta	17–21, 14–21	(silver) Runner-up
2014	Puerto Rico International	(United States) Mathew Fogarty	(Italy) Giovanni Greco (Italy) Rosario Maddaloni	13–21, 12–21	(silver) Runner-up
2014	Chile International	(France) Arnaud Genin	(Peru) Mario Cuba (Peru) Martin del Valle	11–7, 11–10, 10–11, 11–9	(gold) Winner
2014	Giraldilla International	(United States) Mathew Fogarty	(Guatemala) Jonathan Solis (Guatemala) Rodolfo Ramirez	15–21, 11–21	(silver) Runner-up
2013	Carebaco International	(Jamaica) Gareth Henry	(Dominican Republic) Nelson Javier (Dominican Republic) Alberto Raposo	21–19, 21–17	(gold) Winner
2010	Nouméa International	Sebastien Arias	(Australia) Luke Chong (Australia) Oon Hoe Keat	14–21, 12–21	(silver) Runner-up
2010	Canterbury International	(New Zealand) Oliver Leydon-Davis	(United States) Daniel Gouw (United States) Arnold Setiadi	19–21, 19–21	(silver) Runner-up

Mixed doubles
Year	Tournament	Partner	Opponent	Score	Result
2016	Giraldilla International	(Mexico) Mariana Ugalde	(Austria) David Obernosterer (Austria) Elisabeth Baldauf	12–21, 12–21	(silver) Runner-up
2016	Jamaica International	(Mexico) Mariana Ugalde	(Austria) David Obernosterer (Austria) Elisabeth Baldauf	19–21, 21–18, 11–21	(silver) Runner-up
2016	Guatemala International	(Mexico) Mariana Ugalde	(Guatemala) Jonathan Solis (Guatemala) Nikte Alejandra Sotomayor	8–21, 14–21	(silver) Runner-up
2010	Nouméa International	(Mexico) Deyanira Angulo	William Jannic; Cecile Kaddour	21–13, 21–9	(gold) Winner
2010	Miami PanAm International	(Mexico) Deyanira Angulo	(United States) Hock Lai Lee (United States) Priscilla Lun	13–21, 8–21	(silver) Runner-up
2010	Internacional Mexicano	(Mexico) Deyanira Angulo	(Mexico) Andres Lopez (Mexico) Victoria Montero	15–21, 18–21	(silver) Runner-up

BWF International Challenge tournament
BWF International Series tournament
BWF Future Series tournament
