= Kazuteru Kozai =

Japanese badminton player

Personal information
- Born: 25 January 1986 (age 40) Kumamoto Prefecture, Japan
- Height: 1.78 m (5 ft 10 in)
- Weight: 72 kg (159 lb)

Sport
- Country: Japan
- Sport: Badminton
- Handedness: Right

Men's singles
- Highest ranking: 54 (21 January 2010)
- BWF profile
Medal record
Men's badminton
Representing Japan
East Asian Games
Bronze medal – third place	2009 Hong Kong	Men's team

Kazuteru Kozai (古財 和輝, Kozai Kazuteru; born 25 January 1986) is a Japanese badminton player from Tonami club. In 2013, Kozai started to training on Ryukoku University. He has competed in badminton tournaments including the 2008 Thailand Open, the 2009 Malaysia Open Grand Prix Gold and the 2013 Japan Open

== Career ==
At the 2013 Japan Open, Kozai produced a massive first-round upset on his home stage. Entering the tournament as a qualifier ranked World No. 287, he unexpectedly defeated the tournament's second seed, Chen Long of China. Kozai secured the victory in straight games, saving a game point in a tight first game to win the match 24-22, 21–16.

== Achievements ==
=== BWF International Challenge/Series ===
Men's singles

Year	Tournament	Opponent	Score	Result	Ref
2009	Austrian International	(Malaysia) Yeoh Kay Bin	21–12, 12–21, 21–15	(gold) Winner	
2011	Singapore International	(Indonesia) Wisnu Yuli Prasetyo	21–17, 23–21	(gold) Winner	
2013	Osaka International	(Japan) Jun Takemura	21–15, 21–15	(gold) Winner	

BWF International Challenge tournament
BWF International Series tournament
