= Osaka International (badminton) =

Japanese badminton championships

The Osaka International, initially known as the Osaka Satellite, was an international badminton tournament held annually in Osaka, Japan, from 2007 to 2023. Sanctioned by the Badminton World Federation (BWF) as an International Challenge level event, it was hosted by the Nippon Badminton Association (NBA) and overseen by the Osaka Prefectural Badminton Association. The event was discontinued after the 2023 edition.

== Controversies ==
=== 2016 Cancellation ===
Cancellation of the 2016 Osaka International resulted from the Nippon Badminton Association (NBA) missing the application deadline set by the Badminton World Federation (BWF). The BWF had notified the NBA in October 2014 of a deadline change from August to April, but this was reportedly overlooked by NBA staff. The NBA's application, submitted in August 2015 (four months past the revised deadline), was consequently rejected. Following the cancellation, Kinji Zeniya, then executive director of the NBA, publicly apologized and stated the association planned to reapply the next year.

=== Discontinuation ===
The discontinuation of the Osaka International, effective from 2024, was announced by the NBA on 27 October 2023. The decision followed discussions with tournament stakeholders and was communicated to Badminton Asia and the BWF. According to the NBA, the discontinuation stemmed from a re-evaluation of its organizational structure and funding allocation. The NBA noted that the Osaka International had received higher funding compared to other tournaments. When the NBA proposed adjusting future funding to align with other events, the Osaka Prefectural Badminton Association indicated difficulty in continuing under those terms and relinquished its hosting role.

== Previous winners ==
Year	Men's singles	Women's singles	Men's doubles	Women's doubles	Mixed doubles	Ref
2007	(Japan) Shō Sasaki	(Japan) Eriko Hirose	(South Korea) Han Sang-hoon (South Korea) Cho Gun-woo	(Japan) Aki Akao (Japan) Tomomi Matsuda	(Japan) Keita Masuda (Japan) Miyuki Maeda	
2008	(Japan) Kōichi Saeki	(Japan) Megumi Taruno	(South Korea) Kwon Yi-goo (South Korea) Ko Sung-hyun	(Japan) Kumiko Ogura (Japan) Reiko Shiota	(South Korea) Kwon Yi-goo (South Korea) Ha Jung-eun	
2009	(South Korea) Lee Cheol-ho	(Japan) Ai Gotō	(Japan) Yoshiteru Hirobe (Japan) Hajime Komiyama	(Japan) Misaki Matsutomo (Japan) Ayaka Takahashi	(Chinese Taipei) Hsieh Yu-Hsing (Chinese Taipei) Chien Yu-chin	
2010	(Japan) Sho Sasaki	(Macau) Wang Rong	(Japan) Hirokatsu Hashimoto (Japan) Noriyasu Hirata	(Japan) Mizuki Fujii (Japan) Reika Kakiiwa	(Japan) Kenichi Hayakawa (Japan) Shizuka Matsuo	
2011	(Japan) Keigo Sonoda	(Japan) Minatsu Mitani	(Japan) Takatoshi Kurose (Japan) Keigo Sonoda	(Japan) Miri Ichimaru (Japan) Shiho Tanaka	(Japan) Takeshi Kamura (Japan) Koharu Yonemoto	
2012	(Japan) Kazumasa Sakai	(Japan) Sayaka Takahashi	(Japan) Takeshi Kamura (Japan) Keigo Sonoda	(Japan) Rie Etō (Japan) Yū Wakita	(Indonesia) Riky Widianto (Indonesia) Richi Puspita Dili	
2013	(Japan) Kazuteru Kozai	(Japan) Kaori Imabeppu	(Japan) Kenta Kazuno (Japan) Kazushi Yamada	(Japan) Rie Etō (Japan) Yū Wakita	(Indonesia) Lukhi Apri Nugroho (Indonesia) Annisa Saufika	
2014	(Hong Kong) Ng Ka Long	(Japan) Yui Hashimoto	(Japan) Kenta Kazuno (Japan) Kazushi Yamada	(Japan) Shizuka Matsuo (Japan) Mami Naito	(Indonesia) Muhammad Rijal (Indonesia) Vita Marissa	
2015	(South Korea) Jeon Hyeok-jin	(Japan) Sayaka Takahashi	(Japan) Kenta Kazuno (Japan) Kazushi Yamada	(China) Chen Qingchen (China) Jia Yifan	(South Korea) Kim Duck-young (South Korea) Eom Hye-won	
2016	no competition (Note: The 2016 tournament was cancelled due to the Nippon Badminton Association failing to meet the BWF application deadline.)					
2017	(Japan) Yu Igarashi	(Japan) Sayaka Takahashi	(China) Wang Sijie (China) Zhuge Lukai	(South Korea) Kim So-yeong (South Korea) Yoo Hae-won	(China) Wang Sijie (China) Ni Bowen	
2018	(Japan) Yu Igarashi	(Japan) Ayumi Mine	(Japan) Hirokatsu Hashimoto (Japan) Hiroyuki Saeki	(Japan) Naoko Fukuman (Japan) Kurumi Yonao	(South Korea) Kim Won-ho (South Korea) Lee Yu-rim	
2019	(Japan) Koki Watanabe	(Japan) Saena Kawakami	(South Korea) Ko Sung-hyun (South Korea) Shin Baek-cheol	(Japan) Sayaka Hobara (Japan) Natsuki Sone	(South Korea) Kim Won-ho (South Korea) Jeong Na-eun	
2020	Cancelled (Note: The 2020 tournament (1–5 April) was cancelled due to the COVID-19 pandemic in Japan.)					
2021	Cancelled (Note: The 2021 tournament (31 March – 4 April) was cancelled due to the COVID-19 pandemic in Japan.)					
2022	Cancelled (Note: The 2022 tournament (6–10 April) was cancelled due to the COVID-19 pandemic in Japan.)					
2023	(Japan) Yushi Tanaka	(Japan) Shiori Saito	(Japan) Hiroki Midorikawa (Japan) Kyohei Yamashita	(South Korea) Lee Yu-lim (South Korea) Shin Seung-chan	(South Korea) Wang Chan (South Korea) Shin Seung-chan	
2024	Cancelled and discontinued (Note: The tournament was discontinued from 2024 onwards, as announced by the Nippon Badminton Association on 27 October 2023, citing funding reallocation.)					

== Performances by nation ==
As of the finals of the 2023 edition

Pos	Nation	MS	WS	MD	WD	XD	Total
1	Japan*	10	12	9	10	3	44
2	South Korea	2		3	2	5	12
3	China			1	1	1	3
3	Indonesia					3	3
5	Chinese Taipei					1	1
5	Hong Kong	1					1
5	Macau		1				1
Total		13	13	13	13	13	65

* Host nation

== See also ==
- Japan Open
- Japan Masters
