= Lin Yu-hsien =

Taiwanese badminton player (born 1991)

Lin Yu-hsien 林祐賢
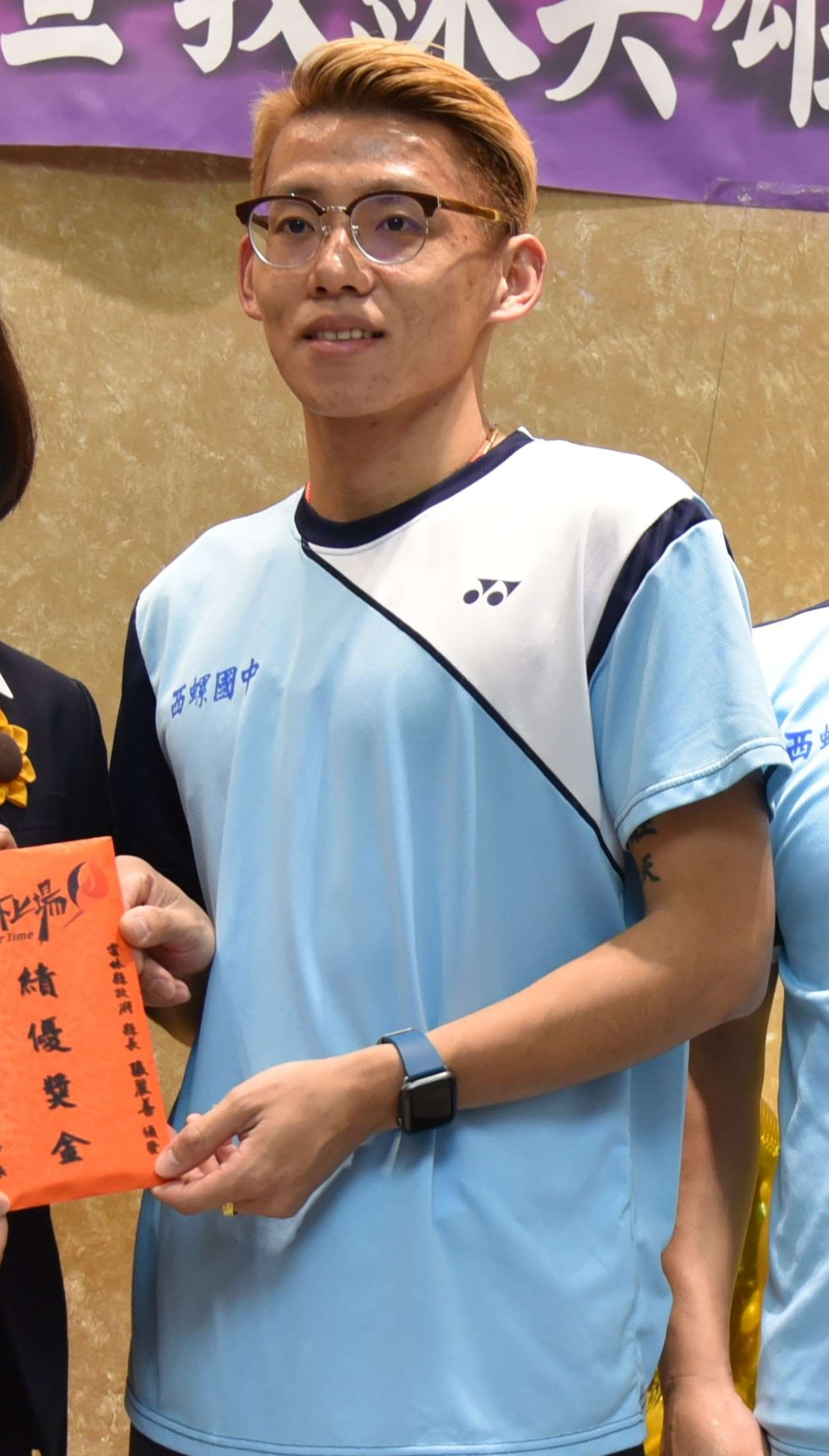

Personal information
- Born: 27 September 1991 (age 35) Yunlin County, Taiwan
- Height: 1.74 m (5 ft 9 in)

Sport
- Country: Republic of China (Taiwan)
- Sport: Badminton
- Handedness: Right

Men's singles
- Highest ranking: 43 (14 September 2017)
- Current ranking: 87 (26 July 2022)
- BWF profile

Lin Yu-hsien (Chinese: 林祐賢; pinyin: Lín Yòuxián; born 27 September 1991) is a Taiwanese badminton player.

== Career ==
He plays in the men's singles. He participated in the 2016 Vietnam Open Grand Prix, in the 2016 Chinese Taipei Masters and in the 2015 Chinese Taipei Masters Grand Prix.

== Achievements ==
=== BWF World Tour (1 title, 1 runner-up) ===
The BWF World Tour, which was announced on 19 March 2017 and implemented in 2018, is a series of elite badminton tournaments sanctioned by the Badminton World Federation (BWF). The BWF World Tour is divided into levels of World Tour Finals, Super 1000, Super 750, Super 500, Super 300 (part of the HSBC World Tour), and the BWF Tour Super 100.

Men's singles
Year	Tournament	Level	Opponent	Score	Result
2018	Lingshui China Masters	Super 100	(China) Lu Guangzu	12–21, 21–12, 21–14	(gold) Winner
2018	Indonesia Masters	Super 100	(Indonesia) Ihsan Maulana Mustofa	17–21, 21–23	(silver) Runner-up

=== BWF Grand Prix (1 runner-up) ===
The BWF Grand Prix had two levels, the Grand Prix and Grand Prix Gold. It was a series of badminton tournaments sanctioned by the Badminton World Federation (BWF) and played between 2007 and 2017.

Men's singles
Year	Tournament	Opponent	Score	Result
2012	Canada Open	(Chinese Taipei) Chou Tien-chen	21–15, 16–21, 9–21	(silver) Runner-up

BWF Grand Prix Gold tournament
BWF Grand Prix tournament

=== BWF International Challenge/Series (2 titles, 1 runner-up) ===
Men's singles
Year	Tournament	Opponent	Score	Result
2013	Singapore International	(Singapore) Derek Wong	18–21, 14–21	(silver) Runner-up
2013	Polish International	(Chinese Taipei) Wang Tzu-wei	21–19, 21–16	(gold) Winner
2019	Norwegian International	(Chinese Taipei) Chen Chi-ting	21–14, 21–13	(gold) Winner

BWF International Challenge tournament
BWF International Series tournament
BWF Future Series tournament
