= Priscilla Lun =

American badminton player (born 1990)

Personal information
- Born: 21 October 1990 (age 36)

Sport
- Country: United States
- Sport: Badminton

Women's
- Highest ranking: 208 (WS) 15 September 2011; 165 (WD) 9 September 2010; 69 (XD) 15 September 2011
- BWF profile
Medal record
Badminton
Representing United States
Pan Am Junior Championships
Gold medal – first place	2008 Guatemala City	Girls' doubles
Bronze medal – third place	2008 Guatemala City	Mixed team

Priscilla Lun (born 21 October 1990) is an American badminton player. She started playing badminton at aged 11, and in 2008, she won the gold medal at the Pan Am Junior Badminton Championships. She also part of the USA women's team who competed at the 2010 Uber Cup in Malaysia.

== Achievements ==
=== Pan Am Junior Championships ===
Girls' Doubles
Year	Venue	Partner	Opponent	Score	Result
2008	Guatemala City, Guatemala	(United States) Rena Wang	(Peru) Katherine Winder (Peru) Claudia Zornoza	21–17, 21–16	Gold

=== BWF International Challenge/Series ===
Women's Doubles
Year	Tournament	Partner	Opponent	Score	Result
2009	Miami Pan Am International	(United States) Paula Lynn Obanana	(Spain) Sandra Chirlaque (Peru) Alejandra Monteverde	22–20, 13–21, 21–13	(gold) Winner

Mixed Doubles
Year	Tournament	Partner	Opponent	Score	Result
2010	Miami PanAm International	(United States) Hock Lai Lee	(New Zealand) Bjorn Seguin (Mexico) Deyanira Angulo	21–13, 21–8	(gold) Winner
2010	Brazil International	(United States) Hock Lai Lee	(United States) Halim Haryanto Ho (United States) Eva Lee	11–21, 20–22	(silver) Runner-up
2009	Miami Pan Am International	(United States) Hock Lai Lee	(Canada) Alexander Pang (Canada) Joycelyn Ko	21–14, 21–15	(gold) Winner

BWF International Challenge tournament
BWF International Series tournament
BWF Future Series tournament
