= Hock Lai Lee =

Malaysian-born American badminton player (born 1987)

Hock Lai Lee 李福來
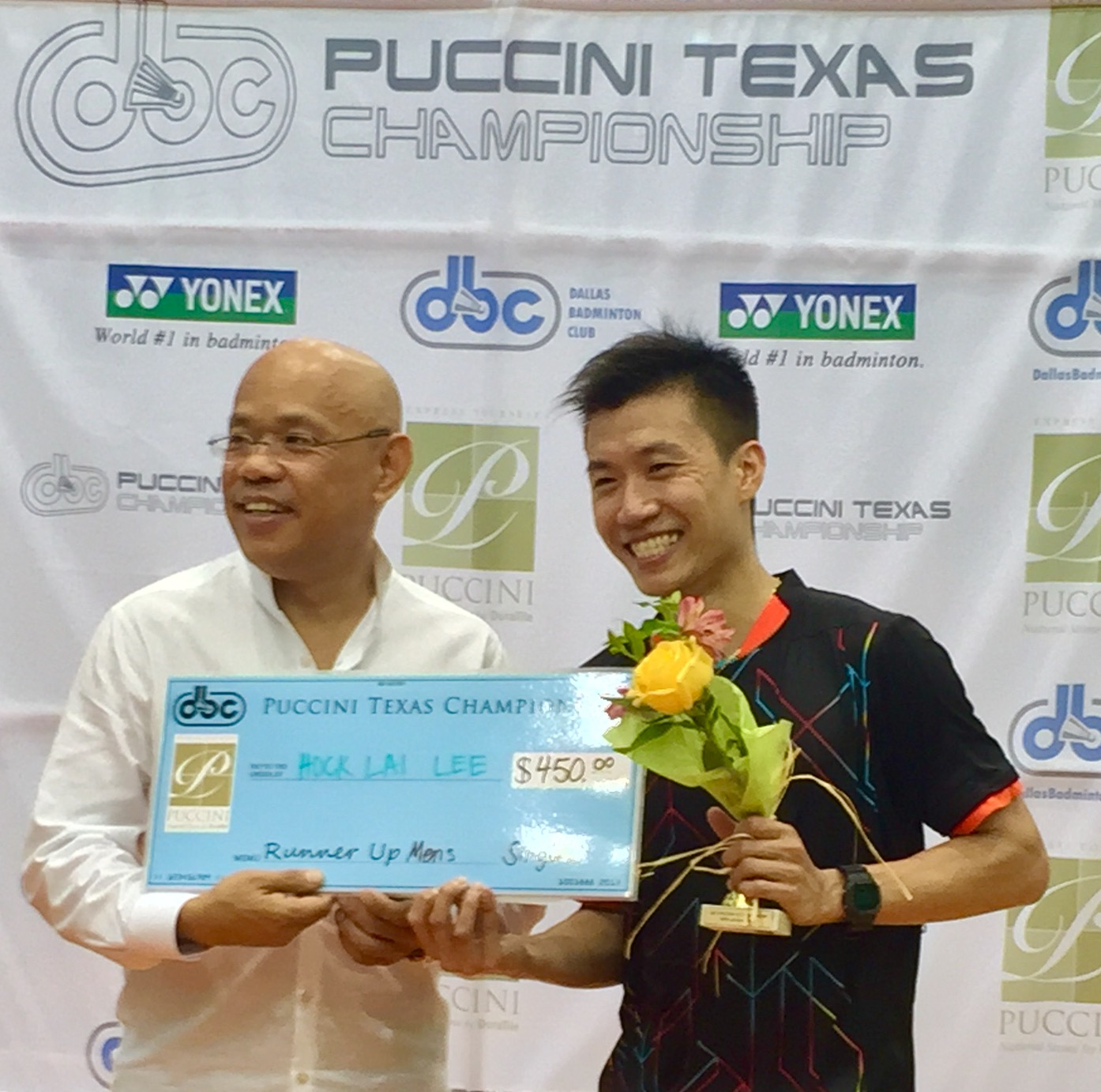

Personal information
- Born: 20 March 1987 (age 39) Penang, Malaysia

Sport
- Country: United States
- Sport: Badminton

Men's
- Highest ranking: 93 (MS) 21 April 2011; 125 (MD) 23 October 2014; 69 (XD) 15 September 2011
- BWF profile
Medal record
Badminton
Representing Malaysia
Asia Junior Championships
Bronze medal – third place	2005 Jakarta	Boys' team

Hock Lai Lee (born 20 March 1987) is a Malaysian-born American badminton player. Lee started his junior career as a Malaysian player based in Penang. In junior event, he won the Pahang Open tournament in the boys' singles event. He also represented Malaysia at the 2005 Asian Junior Championships and win bronze medal in the boys' team event. He won the men's singles title at the U.S. National Badminton Championships in 2010 and 2013. At the BWF International tournament, he won double title at the 2009 Miami Pan Am International in the men's singles and mixed doubles event.

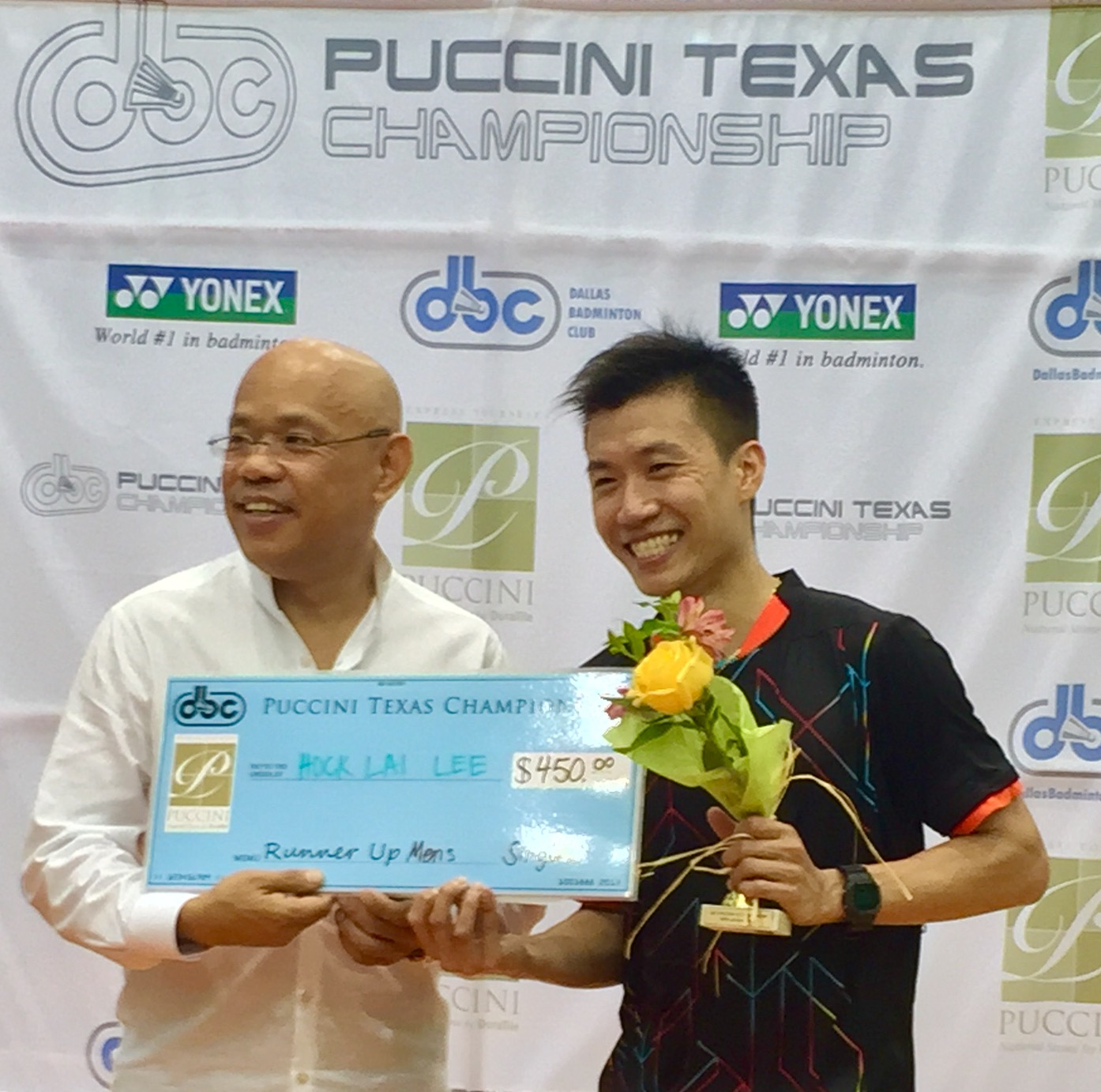
Hock Lai Lee receives runner-up prize money at the 2015 Puccini Texas Championship hosted by Dallas Badminton Club.

== Achievements ==
=== BWF International Challenge/Series ===
Men's Singles
Year	Tournament	Opponent	Score	Result
2016	Internacional Mexicano	(Austria) Vilson Vattanirappel	13–21, 21–15, 16–21	(silver) Runner-up
2014	Peru International	(Cuba) Osleni Guerrero	17–21, 13–21	(silver) Runner-up
2013	USA International	(Japan) Tatsuya Watanabe	21–19, 21–14	(gold) Winner
2010	Brazil International	(Guatemala) Kevin Cordon	21–13, 21–17	(gold) Winner
2009	Miami Pan Am International	(Denmark) Sune Gavnholt	21–17, 17–21, 21–13	(gold) Winner

Men's Doubles
Year	Tournament	Partner	Opponent	Score	Result
2014	Peru International	(United States) Christian Yahya Christianto	(Belgium) Matijs Dierickx (Belgium) Freek Golinski	21–17, 19–21, 13–21	(silver) Runner-up
2013	USA International	(United States) Christian Yahya Christianto	(Canada) Andrew D'Souza (Canada) Sergiy Shatenko	21–9, 21–14	(gold) Winner

Mixed Doubles
Year	Tournament	Partner	Opponent	Score	Result
2010	Miami PanAm International	(United States) Priscilla Lun	(New Zealand) Bjorn Seguin (Mexico) Deyanira Angulo	21–13, 21–8	(gold) Winner
2010	Brazil International	(United States) Priscilla Lun	(United States) Halim Haryanto Ho (United States) Eva Lee	11–21, 20–22	(silver) Runner-up
2009	Miami Pan Am International	(United States) Priscilla Lun	(Canada) Alexander Pang (Canada) Joycelyn Ko	21–14, 21–15	(gold) Winner

BWF International Challenge tournament
BWF International Series tournament
BWF Future Series tournament
