= Arvind Bhat =

Indian badminton player

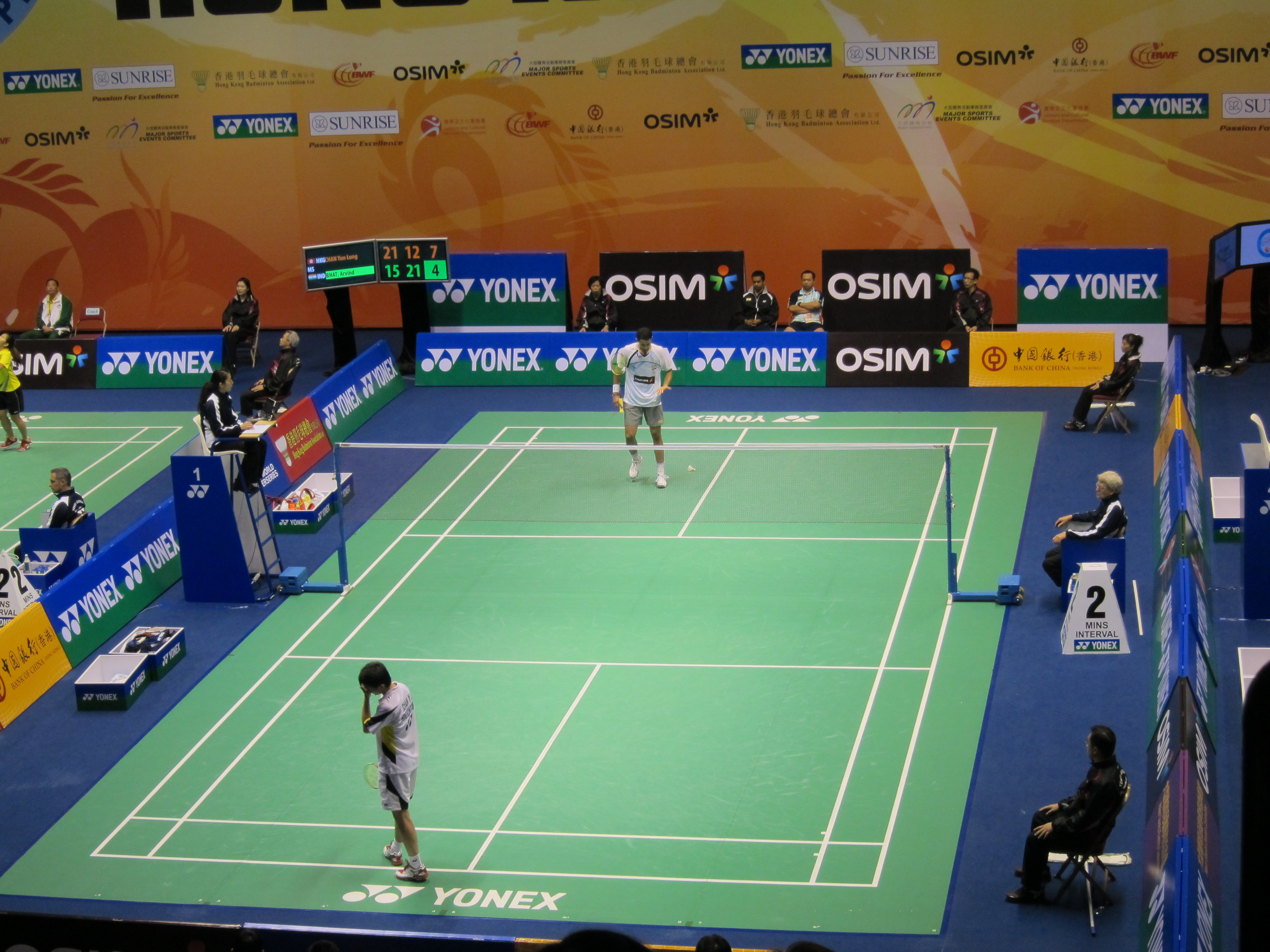

Personal information
- Born: Arvind Bhat; 7 June 1979 (age 47) Madikeri, Kodagu district, Karnataka, India
- Height: 6 ft 1 in (1.85 m)

Sport
- Country: India
- Sport: Badminton
- Handedness: Right
- Coached by: Geetha Badhe, KP Vasanth Kumar, Vimal Kumar, Prakash Padukone, Vinod Kumar, P Gopichand.

Men's singles
- Highest ranking: 22 (29 October 2009)

Arvind Bhat (born 7 June 1979) is a male badminton player from Bangalore, India.

== Career ==
Arvind started his career in Youth centre at the age of 11 in 1991. He proved his mettle at a young age by winning many age group level events at the state. Trained at Sadashivanagar club from 1994 to 1997. He trained at Karnataka Badminton association from 1997 to 2015.

He went on to win Sr. State Championships in 2001. His performance at State and National level in the year 2001–2002 got the nod of selectors and was selected in the Indian team in the year 2002. He also got a call from German clubs to play at the leagues matches there and made a base in Europe for the next 12 years living there for 3–5 months in a year every year. Arvind represented India for 13 years playing in all major events in the world being on tour for almost 8–9 months in a year.

Arvind Bhat won the national championships in India in the year 2008. This was his first national championships title. This he attained after reaching the finals 4 times in the previous 7 years. Then again he won the title in 2011 defeating Kashyap P in what would be called one of the best Championship finals.

On the international level he has won 7 International title including the Scottish Open 2004, the Czech International 2007 and the 2014 German Open. With the 1. BC Bischmisheim he reached gold in the German team championships 2008. He has represented India in more than 100 International events. More recently he participated in Asian games 2010 in Guanzhou, China and was in the Indian team for Sudirman Cup 2011.

Winning the German Open 2014 is the high light of his career. He made his best result at the age of 35. His highest World ranking has been 20 which was attained in Sep 2009.

== Personal life ==
Married to Pallavi Sengupta, a former Bengal player who has played up to the National level for her state West Bengal. Pallavi is a Head HR of Paper Boat. They have a son named Paarth and daughter Anika.

Arvind's parents are BP Saraswathi and B Prabhakar. His brother Avinash Bhat was a former National level player and sister Dr. Anupama Bhat also was involved in sports. She was a president guide. Both his siblings are settled in the US.

== Retirement life ==
Since retirement Arvind has been program head of the Simply Sport Badminton Academy in Bangalore. He was also the head coach for Bengaluru Raptors, Premier Badminton League team. He was also a co-owner for the Bengaluru Raptors team at the premier badminton league. He is national selector for junior India team and also one of the coaches for the Indian senior team.

== Education ==
Schooling at St. Joseph's Indian high school until 10th Standard. PUC at MES College of science. Engineering at UVCE, Bangalore in Mechanical branch.

== Achievements ==
=== BWF Grand Prix ===
The BWF Grand Prix has two levels, the BWF Grand Prix and Grand Prix Gold. It is a series of badminton tournaments sanctioned by the Badminton World Federation (BWF) since 2007. The World Badminton Grand Prix sanctioned by International Badminton Federation (IBF) since 1983.

Men's singles

Year	Tournament	Opponent	Score	Result
2008	Bitburger Open	(India) Chetan Anand	25–23, 22–24, 21–23	(silver) Runner-up
2014	German Open	(Denmark) Hans-Kristian Vittinghus	24–22, 19–21, 21–11	(gold) Winner

BWF Grand Prix Gold tournament
BWF Grand Prix tournament

=== IBF/BWF International ===
Men's singles

Year	Tournament	Opponent	Score	Result
2002	Bangladesh International	(India) J. B. S. Vidyadhar	15–11, 8–15, 15–6	(gold) Winner
2004	Scottish International	(Germany) Marc Zwiebler	15–8, 15–7	(gold) Winner
2005	Polish International	(Poland) Przemysław Wacha	8–15, 7–15	(silver) Runner-up
2007	Czech International	(Austria) Jürgen Koch	21–18, 21–13	(gold) Winner
2007	Syria International	(Spain) Carlos Longo	21–16, 21–18	(gold) Winner
2007	Jordan International	(England) Aamir Ghaffar	21–18, 21–14	(gold) Winner
2007	Pakistan International	(Canada) Bobby Milroy	14–21, 21–15, 15–21	(silver) Runner-up
