= 2013 Canada Open Grand Prix =

Tournament details
- Dates: July 16, 2013 - July 21, 2013
- Total prize money: US$50,000
- Venue: Richmond Olympic Oval
- Location: Richmond, Canada

The 2013 Canada Open Grand Prix was the eighth grand prix gold and grand prix tournament of the 2013 BWF Grand Prix Gold and Grand Prix. The tournament was held in Richmond Olympic Oval, Richmond, Canada July 16 until July 21, 2013 and had a total purse of $50,000.

== Men's singles ==
=== Seeds ===
1. (Japan) Kazumasa Sakai (third round)
2. (Netherlands) Eric Pang (final)
3. (Malaysia) Tan Chun Seang (champion)
4. (Japan) Kento Momota (withdrew)
5. (Malaysia) Ramdan Misbun (semi-final)
6. (Thailand) Suppanyu Avihingsanon (third round)
7. (Israel) Misha Zilberman (withdrew)
8. (Sweden) Henri Hurskainen (semi-final)
9. (Malaysia) Zulfadli Zulkiffli (third round)
10. (Denmark) Joachim Persson (third round)
11. (United States) Sattawat Pongnairat (quarter-final)
12. (Japan) Riichi Takeshita (quarter-final)
13. (Singapore) Ashton Chen Yong Zhao (quarter-final)
14. (India) Arvind Bhat (third round)
15. (Czech Republic) Petr Koukal (second round)
16. (Austria) Michael Lahnsteiner (third round)

=== Finals ===
Quarterfinals
13	(Singapore) Ashton Chen Yong Zhao	16	19
8	(Sweden) Henri Hurskainen	21	21
3	(Malaysia) Tan Chun Seang	21	12	21
12	(Japan) Riichi Takeshita	19	21	9
5	(Malaysia) Ramdan Misbun	17	21	21
11	(United States) Sattawat Pongnairat	21	15	15
(Thailand) Khosit Phetpradab	11	14
2	(Netherlands) Eric Pang	21	21

Semifinals
8	(Sweden) Henri Hurskainen	12	16
3	(Malaysia) Tan Chun Seang	21	21
5	(Malaysia) Ramdan Misbun	21	21	13
2	(Netherlands) Eric Pang	23	13	21

Final
3	(Malaysia) Tan Chun Seang	15	21	21
2	(Netherlands) Eric Pang	21	11	16

=== Top half ===
==== Section 1 ====
First Round
1	(Japan) K Sakai	21	22	21
(Thailand) P Thongnuam	19	24	15
(Canada) D Yuan	16	10
(United States) H Shu	21	21
13	(Singapore) A Chen	21	21
(Canada) R Le	4	6
(Scotland) A Casey
(Mexico) A Quadri	wo

Second Round
1	(Japan) K Sakai	21	21
(United States) H Shu	9	11
13	(Singapore) A Chen	21	21
(Scotland) A Casey	11	12

Third Round
1	(Japan) K Sakai	15	15
13	(Singapore) A Chen	21	21

==== Section 2 ====
First Round
8	(Sweden) H Hurskainen	21	21
(Philippines) A Gadi	14	16
(United States) R Chew	7	13
(Chinese Taipei) Hsu J-t	21	21
16	(Austria) M Lahnsteiner	21	21
Q4	(Canada) D Yao	8	6
(Trinidad and Tobago) N Bonkowsky	7	12
(Canada) T Ng	21	21

Second Round
8	(Sweden) H Hurskainen	21	21
(Chinese Taipei) Hsu J-t	11	18
16	(Austria) M Lahnsteiner	21	21
(Canada) T Ng	12	14

Third Round
8	(Sweden) H Hurskainen	21	21
16	(Austria) M Lahnsteiner	18	19

==== Section 3 ====
First Round
3	(Malaysia) Tan CS	21	21
(United States) A Amphie	12	9
(Canada) S Shatenko
(United States) I Perez	wo
10	(Denmark) J Persson	21	21
(Canada) A Zhuang	12	15
(Mexico) L Munoz	10	13
(Canada) T Chiu	21	21

Second Round
3	(Malaysia) Tan CS	21	21
(Canada) S Shatenko	15	9
10	(Denmark) J Persson	21	21
(Canada) T Chiu	14	14

Third Round
3	(Malaysia) Tan CS	19	22	21
10	(Denmark) J Persson	21	20	9

==== Section 4 ====
First Round
PFQ	(Canada) A Lau	21	21
(England) M Spencer-Smith	17	19
Q7	(Canada) M Lim	17	12
Q8	(Canada) A Lin	21	21
12	(Japan) R Takeshita	21	21
PFQ	(Canada) L Couture	8	7
Q6	(Canada) Kai D	18	21	21
(Canada) B Lin	21	10	16

Second Round
PFQ	(Canada) A Lau	21	17	21
Q8	(Canada) A Lin	12	21	8
12	(Japan) R Takeshita	21	21
Q6	(Canada) Kai D	14	10

Third Round
PFQ	(Canada) A Lau	14	11
12	(Japan) R Takeshita	21	21

=== Bottom half ===
==== Section 5 ====
First Round
Q2	(Canada) J Kryczka	21	21
PFQ	(Australia) N Kam	14	11
(Canada) N Osborne	13	18
14	(India) A Bhat	21	21
(United States) S Phanpuchara	21	21
PFQ	(United States) T Lam	16	11
(Canada) C Che	4	6
5	(Malaysia) R Misbun	21	21

Second Round
Q2	(Canada) J Kryczka	10	10
14	(India) A Bhat	21	21
(United States) S Phanpuchara	9	10
5	(Malaysia) R Misbun	21	21

Third Round
14	(India) A Bhat	19	21	20
5	(Malaysia) R Misbun	21	17	22

==== Section 6 ====
First Round
(New Zealand) J Wu	21	21
(Canada) N Yakura	12	12
(Austria) R Gnedt	9	18
11	(United States) S Pongnairat	21	21
(Austria) D Obernosterer	21	21
(Canada) B Leung	7	4
(United States) C Stensland
PFQ	(Philippines) R Pedrosa	wo

Second Round
(New Zealand) J Wu	13	12
11	(United States) S Pongnairat	21	21
(Austria) D Obernosterer	21	21
(United States) C Stensland	15	11

Third Round
11	(United States) S Pongnairat	21	21
(Austria) D Obernosterer	11	10

==== Section 7 ====
First Round
(Austria) L Wraber	8	15
(Thailand) K Phetpradab	21	21
(Philippines) M Alcala	9	7
15	(Czech Republic) P Koukal	21	21
(United States) Lee HL	21	21
Q5	(Canada) M Hamer	2	2
Q3	(United States) S Karve	5	5
6	(Thailand) S Avihingsanon	21	21

Second Round
(Thailand) K Phetpradab	21	21
15	(Czech Republic) P Koukal	17	16
(United States) Lee HL	21	19	13
6	(Thailand) S Avihingsanon	11	21	21

Third Round
(Thailand) K Phetpradab	19	24	22
6	(Thailand) S Avihingsanon	21	22	20

==== Section 8 ====
First Round
(Canada) J Liu	22	8	21
(United States) G.J. Watts	20	21	13
(Denmark) C Thomsen	13	21	19
9	(Malaysia) Z Zulkiffli	21	12	21
Q1	(Canada) E Nilsson	11	11
(Austria) W Gnedt	21	21
(Canada) A D'Souza	14	14
2	(Netherlands) E Pang	21	21

Second Round
(Canada) J Liu	12	17
9	(Malaysia) Z Zulkiffli	21	21
(Austria) W Gnedt	15	10
2	(Netherlands) E Pang	21	21

Third Round
9	(Malaysia) Z Zulkiffli	21	11	5
2	(Netherlands) E Pang	17	21	21

== Women's singles ==
=== Seeds ===
1. (Thailand) Nichaon Jindapon (champion)
2. (Thailand) Sapsiree Taerattanachai (second round)
3. (Hong Kong) Yip Pui Yin (final)
4. (Spain) Carolina Marín (semi-final)
5. (Japan) Yui Hashimoto (quarter-final)
6. (Hong Kong) Chan Tsz Ka (quarter-final)
7. (Japan) Kaori Imabeppu (quarter-final)
8. (Spain) Beatriz Corrales (second round)

=== Finals ===
Semifinals
1	(Thailand) Nichaon Jindapon	15	21	21
4	(Spain) Carolina Marín	21	10	18
3	(Hong Kong) Yip Pui Yin	22	13	21
(Japan) Yuka Kusunose	20	21	19

Final
1	(Thailand) Nichaon Jindapon	21	21
3	(Hong Kong) Yip Pui Yin	18	16

=== Top half ===
==== Section 1 ====
First Round
1	(Thailand) N Jindapon	21	21
(Japan) S Sato	14	9
(Thailand) N Saengchote	6	21
(United States) B Zhang	21	23
6	(Hong Kong) Chan TK	11	21	24
(Japan) K Ito	21	16	22
Q2	(Canada) R Kuramochi	16	14
Q4	(United States) C Look	21	21

Second Round
1	(Thailand) N Jindapon	21	15
(United States) B Zhang	14	8^{r}
6	(Hong Kong) Chan TK	21	21
Q4	(United States) C Look	3	4

Quarterfinals
1	(Thailand) N Jindapon	21	19	21
6	(Hong Kong) Chan TK	16	21	18

==== Section 2 ====
First Round
4	(Spain) C Marín	21	21
Q3	(Canada) V So	4	5
(France) P Le Buhanic	7	21	21
(Singapore) Xing AY	21	18	18
5	(Japan) Y Hashimoto	21	21
(Austria) S Prutsch	6	15
(Canada) M Li
PFQ	(Philippines) J De Vera	wo

Second Round
4	(Spain) C Marín	21	21
(France) P Le Buhanic	5	6
5	(Japan) Y Hashimoto	23	21
(Canada) M Li	21	8

Quarterfinals
4	(Spain) C Marín	21	21
5	(Japan) Y Hashimoto	16	17

=== Bottom half ===
==== Section 3 ====
First Round
Q1	(Canada) Q Ouyang	13	11
(Philippines) M Alcala	21	21
PFQ	(China) Tai Y	9	11
7	(Japan) K Imabeppu	21	21
(Czech Republic) D Koukalova	21	21
(Canada) J Che	13	11
(England) F Chapman	19	4
3	(Hong Kong) Yip PY	21	21

Second Round
(Philippines) M Alcala	8	11
7	(Japan) K Imabeppu	21	21
(Czech Republic) D Koukalova	10	3
3	(Hong Kong) Yip PY	21	21

Quarterfinals
7	(Japan) K Imabeppu	8	18
3	(Hong Kong) Yip PY	21	21

==== Section 4 ====
First Round
(Switzerland) S Jaquet	17	8
(Japan) Y Kusunose	21	21
(United States) J Subandhi	18	11
8	(Spain) B Corrales	21	21
(United States) K Velez	15	10
(Japan) A Mine	21	21
(Canada) C Tsai	9	23	8
2	(Thailand) S Taerattanachai	21	21	21

Second Round
(Japan) Y Kusunose	17	21	21
8	(Spain) B Corrales	21	12	18
(Japan) A Mine	21	0
2	(Thailand) S Taerattanachai	10	0^{r}

Quarterfinals
(Japan) Y Kusunose	21	21
(Japan) A Mine	13	12

== Men's doubles ==
Maneepong Jongjit and his former partner, Bodin Issara, had a brawl during the change of ends during the men's doubles final between Jongjit, partnered with Nipitphon Puangpuapech, and Issara and his new partner, Pakkawat Vilailak.

The former partners who had unresolved issues with each other, verbally abused each other during the first game, being warned by the umpire. The abuse continued at the end of the game, leading Issara to chase Jongit across the arena.

In an act of self-defense while running away from Issara, Jongit swung his racquet and hit Issara in the side of the head, which left Issara bleeding from his right ear and requiring stitches, before Issara caught up with Jongit — who fell to the floor on the adjacent court — and began hitting, punching and kicking him. The two were eventually broken up by Issara's partner and their coach before police and security intervened.

After the fight, the tournament referee showed Issara and Vilailak a black card, meaning they were ejected from the tournament, consequently awarding the championship to Jongjit and Puangpuapech.

Both Issara and Jongjit received sanctions from the Badminton World Federation and from the Badminton Association of Thailand: Issara, who was deemed to be the instigator and more physically abusive, was banned for two years from participating in any international tournaments, while Jongjit, who had provoked Issara during the match, was banned for three months.

=== Seeds ===
1. (Japan) Takeshi Kamura / Keigo Sonoda (quarter-final)
2. (Thailand) Maneepong Jongjit / Nipitphon Puangpuapech (champion)
3. (Japan) Hiroyuki Saeki / Ryota Taohata (withdrew)
4. (United States) Phillip Chew / Sattawat Pongnairat (second round)
5. (Netherlands) Ruud Bosch / Koen Ridder (semi-final)
6. (Canada) Adrian Liu / Derrick Ng (quarter-final)
7. (Netherlands) Jacco Arends / Jelle Maas (first round)
8. (Thailand) Bodin Issara / Pakkawat Vilailak (Disqualified)

=== Finals ===
Semifinals
5	(Netherlands) Ruud Bosch (Netherlands) Koen Ridder	21	10	17
8	(Thailand) Bodin Issara (Thailand) Pakkawat Vilailak	15	21	21
PFQ	(China) Wang Yilu (China) Zhang Ningyi	14	19
2	(Thailand) Maneepong Jongjit (Thailand) Nipitphon Puangpuapech	21	21

Final
8	(Thailand) Bodin Issara (Thailand) Pakkawat Vilailak	12	0^{d}
2	(Thailand) Maneepong Jongjit (Thailand) Nipitphon Puangpuapech	21	0

=== Top half ===
==== Section 1 ====
First Round
1	(Japan) T Kamura (Japan) K Sonoda	21	21
(New Zealand) K Dennerly-Minturn (New Zealand) O Leydon-Davis	12	16
(Chinese Taipei) Hsu J-t (Chinese Taipei) Tien J-c	21	19	21
(Philippines) K Asuncion (Philippines) A Gadi	12	21	17
5	(Netherlands) R Bosch (Netherlands) K Ridder	21	21
(Australia) R Middleton (Australia) R Smith	10	13
Q4	(Canada) S Lee (Canada) B Leung	21	21
Q1	(Canada) R Le (Canada) A Luong	16	7

Second Round
1	(Japan) T Kamura (Japan) K Sonoda	21	21
(Chinese Taipei) Hsu J-t (Chinese Taipei) Tien J-c	9	8
5	(Netherlands) R Bosch (Netherlands) K Ridder	21	21
Q4	(Canada) S Lee (Canada) B Leung	3	8

Quarterfinals
1	(Japan) T Kamura (Japan) K Sonoda	9	13
5	(Netherlands) R Bosch (Netherlands) K Ridder	21	21

==== Section 2 ====
First Round
4	(United States) P Chew (United States) S Pongnairat	21	21
(Canada) K Li (Canada) N Yakura	19	16
(Hong Kong) Chan YL (Hong Kong) Lee CH	21	21
(Canada) A D'Souza (Canada) S Shatenko	16	11
8	(Thailand) B Issara (Thailand) P Vilailak	21	21
(Austria) R Gnedt (Austria) W Gnedt	5	7
(China) Tang SH (China) Wang TY	21	21
Q2	(Canada) V Teo (Canada) D Woo	13	8

Second Round
4	(United States) P Chew (United States) S Pongnairat	13	10
(Hong Kong) Chan YL (Hong Kong) Lee CH	21	21
8	(Thailand) B Issara (Thailand) P Vilailak	21	21
(China) Tang SH (China) Wang TY	13	9

Quarterfinals
(Hong Kong) Chan YL (Hong Kong) Lee CH	18	13
8	(Thailand) B Issara (Thailand) P Vilailak	21	21

=== Bottom half ===
==== Section 3 ====
First Round
Q3	(Canada) J Kryczka (Canada) G Robb	16	11
(Canada) B Lin (Canada) D Yao	21	21
PFQ	(China) Wang YL (China) Zhang NY	19	21	21
7	(Netherlands) J Arends (Netherlands) J Maas	21	12	19
PFQ	(China) Pei TY (China) Shi LF	29	21
(Austria) J Koch (Denmark) C Thomsen	27	12
(Thailand) W Ampunsuwan (Thailand) P Chalardchaleam	21	21
PFQ	(Canada) Chen L (Canada) Kai D	12	13

Second Round
(Canada) B Lin (Canada) D Yao	11	7
PFQ	(China) Wang YL (China) Zhang NY	21	21
(China) Pei TY (China) Shi LF	17	21	21
(Thailand) W Ampunsuwan (Thailand) P Chalardchaleam	21	19	18

Quarterfinals
PFQ	(China) Wang YL (China) Zhang NY	21	21
(China) Pei TY (China) Shi LF	10	19

==== Section 4 ====
First Round
(Canada) T Ng (Canada) J Ruan	21	21
(Trinidad and Tobago) N Bonkowsky (Trinidad and Tobago) J Ramjass	6	6
(Philippines) R Pedrosa (Philippines) W Lopez II	wo
6	(Canada) A Liu (Canada) D Ng
(Canada) B Mear (Canada) J Wong	15	18
(United States) R Chew (United States) C Stensland	21	21
(United States) S Phanpuchara (United States) G.J. Watts	9	13
2	(Thailand) M Jongjit (Thailand) N Puangpuapech	21	21

Second Round
(Canada) T Ng (Canada) J Ruan	19	22
6	(Canada) A Liu (Canada) D Ng	21	24
(United States) R Chew (United States) C Stensland	11	5
2	(Thailand) M Jongjit (Thailand) N Puangpuapech	21	21

Quarterfinals
6	(Canada) A Liu (Canada) D Ng	16	10
2	(Thailand) M Jongjit (Thailand) N Puangpuapech	21	21

== Women's doubles ==
=== Seeds ===
1. (Macau) Wang Rong / Zhang Zhibo (semi-final)
2. (United States) Eva Lee / Paula Lynn Obanana (quarter-final)
3. (Canada) Alex Bruce / Phyllis Chan (quarter-final)
4. (Canada) Grace Gao / Michelle Li (semi-final)

=== Finals ===
Semifinals
1	(Macau) Wang Rong (Macau) Zhang Zhibo	16	10
(Netherlands) Eefje Muskens (Netherlands) Selena Piek	21	21
4	(Canada) Grace Gao (Canada) Michelle Li	12	14
(China) Yu Xiaohan (China) Huang Yaqiong	21	21

Final
(Netherlands) Eefje Muskens (Netherlands) Selena Piek	21	11	13
(China) Yu Xiaohan (China) Huang Yaqiong	13	21	21

=== Top half ===
==== Section 1 ====
First Round
1	(Macau) Wang R (Macau) Zhang ZB
BYE
(Switzerland) S Jaquet (France) P Le Buhanic
BYE
(Canada) Luong H (Canada) R Kuramochi
BYE
(China) Tai Y (Canada) C Tsai
BYE

Second Round
1	(Macau) Wang R (Macau) Zhang ZB	21	21
(Switzerland) S Jaquet (France) P Le Buhanic	17	15
(Canada) Luong H (Canada) R Kuramochi	3	5
(China) Tai Y (Canada) C Tsai	21	21

Quarterfinals
1	(Macau) Wang R (Macau) Zhang ZB	21	21
(China) Tai Y (Canada) C Tsai	8	10

==== Section 2 ====
First Round
3	(Canada) A Bruce (Canada) P Chan
BYE
(Philippines) J De Vera (Philippines) K Salatan
BYE
(Netherlands) E Muskens (Netherlands) S Piek
BYE
(China) Du P (China) Xiong MJ
BYE

Second Round
3	(Canada) A Bruce (Canada) P Chan
(Philippines) J De Vera (Philippines) K Salatan	wo
(Netherlands) E Muskens (Netherlands) S Piek	15	21	21
(China) Du P (China) Xiong MJ	21	14	15

Quarterfinals
3	(Canada) A Bruce (Canada) P Chan	9	14
(Netherlands) E Muskens (Netherlands) S Piek	21	21

=== Bottom half ===
==== Section 3 ====
First Round
(New Zealand) K Gregory (New Zealand) S Leydon-Davis	7	9
(Netherlands) S Barning (Netherlands) I Tabeling	21	21
BYE
(Philippines) M Alcala (Philippines) F Lamigo
BYE
(Canada) J Che (Canada) Q Ouyang
BYE
4	(Canada) G Gao (Canada) M Li

Second Round
(Netherlands) S Barning (Netherlands) I Tabeling
(Philippines) M Alcala (Philippines) F Lamigo	wo
(Canada) J Che (Canada) Q Ouyang	11	10
4	(Canada) G Gao (Canada) M Li	21	21

Quarterfinals
(Netherlands) S Barning (Netherlands) I Tabeling	17	15
4	(Canada) G Gao (Canada) M Li	21	21

==== Section 4 ====
First Round
BYE
(France) L Choinet (United States) K Velez
BYE
(China) Yu XH (China) Huang YQ
BYE
(Mexico) C Gonzalez (Mexico) N Gonzalez
BYE
2	(United States) E Lee (United States) P Obanana

Second Round
(France) L Choinet (United States) K Velez	7	7
(China) Yu XH (China) Huang YQ	21	21
(Mexico) C Gonzalez (Mexico) N Gonzalez	wo
2	(United States) E Lee (United States) P Obanana

Quarterfinals
(China) Yu XH (China) Huang YQ	21	18	21
2	(United States) E Lee (United States) P Obanana	12	21	10

== Mixed doubles ==
=== Seeds ===
1. (Hong Kong) Lee Chun Hei / Chau Hoi Wah (champion)
2. (United States) Phillip Chew / Jamie Subandhi (quarter-final)
3. (Netherlands) Jorrit de Ruiter / Samantha Barning (final)
4. (Netherlands) Jelle Maas / Iris Tabeling (second round)

=== Finals ===
Semifinals
1	(Hong Kong) Lee Chun Hei (Hong Kong) Chau Hoi Wah	22	21	21
(Thailand) Maneepong Jongjit (Thailand) Sapsiree Taerattanachai	24	15	13
3	(Netherlands) Jorrit de Ruiter (Netherlands) Samantha Barning	21	21
(Philippines) Kennevic Asuncion (United States) Eva Lee	19	15

Final
1	(Hong Kong) Lee Chun Hei (Hong Kong) Chau Hoi Wah	21	21
3	(Netherlands) Jorrit de Ruiter (Netherlands) Samantha Barning	13	10

=== Top half ===
==== Section 1 ====
First Round
1	(Hong Kong) Lee CH (Hong Kong) Chau HW
BYE
(Canada) C Che (Canada) Q Ouyang
(China) Chen ZF (China) Xiong MJ	wo
(Canada) T Ng (Canada) A Bruce
BYE
(Canada) A Lee (Canada) V So	5	2
(China) Wang YL (China) Huang YQ	21	21

Second Round
1	(Hong Kong) Lee CH (Hong Kong) Chau HW	21	21
(Canada) C Che (Canada) Q Ouyang	7	9
(Canada) T Ng (Canada) A Bruce	15	25	22
(China) Wang YL (China) Huang YQ	21	23	20

Quarterfinals
1	(Hong Kong) Lee CH (Hong Kong) Chau HW	22	21
(Canada) T Ng (Canada) A Bruce	20	9

==== Section 2 ====
First Round
4	(Netherlands) J Maas (Netherlands) I Tabeling
BYE
(United States) Lee HL (Canada) P Chan	21	21
(Canada) J Ruan (China) Tai Y	12	14
(Netherlands) J Arends (Netherlands) S Piek	21	19	7
(Thailand) M Jongjit (Thailand) S Taerattanachai	11	21	21
(China) Zhang NY (China) Du P	21	21
(New Zealand) K Dennerly-Minturn (New Zealand) K Gregory	10	12

Second Round
4	(Netherlands) J Maas (Netherlands) I Tabeling	20	20
(United States) Lee HL (Canada) P Chan	22	22
(Thailand) M Jongjit (Thailand) S Taerattanachai	23	21
(China) Zhang NY (China) Du P	21	14

Quarterfinals
(United States) Lee HL (Canada) P Chan	17	11
(Thailand) M Jongjit (Thailand) S Taerattanachai	21	21

=== Bottom half ===
==== Section 3 ====
First Round
(Trinidad and Tobago) N Bonkowsky (Canada) Luong H	3	6
(Canada) A Liu (Canada) J Ko	21	21
(Australia) R Smith (Australia) R Veeran	21	21
(Canada) A Luong (Canada) R Kuramochi	5	2
(Canada) N Osborne (Canada) G Gao	18	17
(Chinese Taipei) Tien J-c (Canada) C Tsai	21	21
BYE
3	(Netherlands) J de Ruiter (Netherlands) S Barning

Second Round
(Canada) A Liu (Canada) J Ko	16	21	21
(Australia) R Smith (Australia) R Veeran	21	12	19
(Chinese Taipei) Tien J-c (Canada) C Tsai	19	16
3	(Netherlands) J de Ruiter (Netherlands) S Barning	21	21

Quarterfinals
(Canada) A Liu (Canada) J Ko	21	10	8
3	(Netherlands) J de Ruiter (Netherlands) S Barning	18	21	21

==== Section 4 ====
First Round
(China) Lu K (China) Yu XH	wo
(New Zealand) O Leydon-Davis (New Zealand) S Leydon-Davis
(Philippines) K Asuncion (United States) E Lee	21	16	21
(Netherlands) K Ridder (France) L Choinet	16	21	17
(Philippines) W Lopez II (Philippines) J De Vera
(Mexico) L Munoz (Mexico) C Gonzalez	wo
BYE
2	(United States) P Chew (United States) J Subandhi

Second Round
(New Zealand) O Leydon-Davis (New Zealand) S Leydon-Davis	14	21	12
(Philippines) K Asuncion (United States) E Lee	21	19	21
(Philippines) W Lopez II (Philippines) J De Vera	wo
2	(United States) P Chew (United States) J Subandhi

Quarterfinals
(Philippines) K Asuncion (United States) E Lee	21	21
2	(United States) P Chew (United States) J Subandhi	9	10

Preceded by 2013 U.S. Open Grand Prix Gold	BWF Grand Prix Gold and Grand Prix; 2013 season	Succeeded by 2013 Chinese Taipei Open Grand Prix Gold
