= 2013 Japan Super Series =

Tournament details
- Dates: 17 September 2013 - 22 September 2013
- Total prize money: US$200,000
- Location: Tokyo, Japan

The 2013 Japan Super Series was the eighth super series tournament of the 2013 BWF Super Series. The tournament was held in Tokyo, Japan from 17–22 September 2013 and had a total purse of $200,000.

== Men's singles ==
=== Seeds ===
1. (Malaysia) Lee Chong Wei (Champion)
2. (China) Chen Long
3. (China) Du Pengyu
4. (Thailand) Boonsak Ponsana
5. (Vietnam) Nguyễn Tiến Minh
6. (Indonesia) Tommy Sugiarto
7. (Japan) Kenichi Tago
8. (Hong Kong) Hu Yun

=== Top half ===
First Round
1	(Malaysia) Lee C W	21	21
(Chinese Taipei) Hsu J-h	15	9
PFQ	(India) A Pawar	21	7	21
(Indonesia) S D Kuncoro	17	21	18
8	(Hong Kong) Hu Y	23	21
(India) B Sai Praneeth	21	18
(India) S Varma	24	19	14
Q3	(Japan) J Takemura	22	21	21
4	(Thailand) B Ponsana	5^{r}
Q2	(Japan) Y Ikeda	11
(India) A Jayaram	21	21
(Chinese Taipei) Chou T-c	11	18
5	(Vietnam) Nguyễn T M	14	21	21
(China) Wang ZM	21	11	14
Q1	(Japan) R Takeshita	18	14
(Japan) K Momota	21	21

Second Round
1	(Malaysia) Lee C W	21	21
PFQ	(India) A Pawar	12	16
8	(Hong Kong) Hu Y	18	17
Q3	(Japan) J Takemura	21	21
Q2	(Japan) Y Ikeda	13	21	18
(India) A Jayaram	21	11	21
5	(Vietnam) Nguyễn T M	21	19	21
(Japan) K Momota	17	21	15

Quarterfinals
1	(Malaysia) Lee C W	21	21
Q3	(Japan) J Takemura	10	11
(India) A Jayaram	18	13
5	(Vietnam) Nguyễn T M	21	21

Semifinals
1	(Malaysia) Lee C W	21	21
5	(Vietnam) Nguyễn T M	10	5

=== Bottom half ===
First Round
(China) Gao H	21	21
(Japan) K Sakai	12	12
(Thailand) T Saensomboonsuk	30	21
6	(Indonesia) T Sugiarto	28	13
(Japan) T Ueda	14	21	13
(Denmark) J Ø Jørgensen	21	19	21
(Hong Kong) Wong W K	21	17	22
PFQ	(India) Prannoy H. S.	15	21	24
(Indonesia) D H Rumbaka	21	11	12
(Germany) M Zwiebler	16	21	21
(China) Chen YK	17	20
7	(Japan) K Tago	21	22
PFQ	(India) S Kidambi	22	22	21
(Japan) S Sasaki	20	24	18
Q4	(Japan) K Kozai	24	21
2	(China) Chen L	22	16

Second Round
(China) Gao H	21	21
(Thailand) T Saensomboonsuk	13	5
(Denmark) J Ø Jørgensen	14	21	17
PFQ	(India) Prannoy H. S.	21	13	21
(Germany) M Zwiebler	16	21	14
7	(Japan) K Tago	21	19	21
PFQ	(India) S Kidambi	21	21
Q4	(Japan) K Kozai	12	16

Quarterfinals
(China) Gao H	21	20	21
PFQ	(India) Prannoy H. S.	11	22	13
7	(Japan) K Tago	21	21
PFQ	(India) S Kidambi	18	9

Semifinals
(China) Gao H	12	12
7	(Japan) K Tago	21	21

=== Finals ===
Semifinals
1	(Malaysia) Lee Chong Wei	21	21
5	(Vietnam) Nguyễn Tiến Minh	10	5
(China) Gao Huan	12	12
7	(Japan) Kenichi Tago	21	21

Final
1	(Malaysia) Lee Chong Wei	23	21
7	(Japan) Kenichi Tago	21	17

== Women's singles ==
=== Seeds ===
1. (China) Li Xuerui
2. (Thailand) Ratchanok Intanon
3. (India) Saina Nehwal (Withdrawn)
4. (China) Wang Yihan
5. (China) Wang Shixian
6. (Chinese Taipei) Tai Tzu-ying
7. (Japan) Minatsu Mitani
8. (India) P. V. Sindhu

=== Top half ===
First Round
1	(China) Li XR
PFQ	(Japan) A Ohori	w	/	o
(Japan) Y Hashimoto	21	20	21
(Thailand) B Ongbamrungphan	13	22	15
8	(India) P. V. Sindhu	21	21
Q4	(Japan) Y Nakai	12	13
Q1	(Japan) A Yamaguchi	16	21	21
Q3	(Japan) A Mine	21	13	8
PFQ	(New Zealand) A Rankin	6	6
(Indonesia) L Fanetri	21	21
(India) T Lad	15	10
(Japan) S Takahashi	21	21
6	(Chinese Taipei) Tai T-y	21	6
(Canada) N Grether	11	2^{r}
(China) Han L	21	21
(Japan) K Ito	19	15

Second Round
PFQ	(Japan) A Ohori	18	10
(Japan) Y Hashimoto	21	21
8	(India) P. V. Sindhu	6	17
Q1	(Japan) A Yamaguchi	21	21
(Indonesia) L Fanetri	12	7
(Japan) S Takahashi	21	21
6	(Chinese Taipei) Tai T-y	21	21
(China) Han L	16	18

Quarterfinals
(Japan) Y Hashimoto	12	16
Q1	(Japan) A Yamaguchi	21	21
(Japan) S Takahashi	20	18
6	(Chinese Taipei) Tai T-y	22	21

Semifinals
Q1	(Japan) A Yamaguchi	26	21
6	(Chinese Taipei) Tai T-y	24	14

=== Bottom half ===
First Round
(Hong Kong) Chan T K	21	21
(Austria) S Prutsch	13	14
(Hong Kong) Yip P Y	11	12
5	(China) Wang SX	21	21
(Japan) E Hirose	21	21
Q2	(Japan) S Sato	10	12
(Japan) K Imabeppu	10	13
4	(China) Wang YH	21	21
(China) Yu S	13	21	18
(Japan) Y Kusunose	21	14	21
(Chinese Taipei) Pai H-m	15	11
7	(Japan) M Mitani	21	21
(United States) J Subandhi	17	4
(Thailand) P Buranaprasertsuk	21	21
PFQ	(Japan) S Uchida	w	/	o
2	(Thailand) R Intanon

Second Round
(Hong Kong) Chan T K	12	18
5	(China) Wang SX	21	21
(Japan) E Hirose	19	14
4	(China) Wang YH	21	21
(Japan) Y Kusunose	16	15
7	(Japan) M Mitani	21	21
(Thailand) P Buranaprasertsuk	21	15	14
PFQ	(Japan) S Uchida	19	21	21

Quarterfinals
5	(China) Wang SX	17	15
4	(China) Wang YH	21	21
7	(Japan) M Mitani	21	13	17
PFQ	(Japan) S Uchida	19	21	21

Semifinals
4	(China) Wang YH	17	14
PFQ	(Japan) S Uchida	21	21

=== Finals ===
Semifinals
Q1	(Japan) Akane Yamaguchi	26	21
6	(Chinese Taipei) Tai Tzu-ying	24	14
4	(China) Wang Yihan	17	14
PFQ	(Japan) Shizuka Uchida	21	21

Final
Q1	(Japan) Akane Yamaguchi	21	21
PFQ	(Japan) Shizuka Uchida	15	19

== Men's doubles ==
=== Seeds ===
1. (Indonesia) Mohammad Ahsan / Hendra Setiawan [(champion)]
2. (Denmark) Mathias Boe / Carsten Mogensen
3. (Japan) Hiroyuki Endo / Kenichi Hayakawa
4. (China) Liu Xiaolong / Qiu Zihan
5. (Indonesia) Angga Pratama / Rian Agung Saputro
6. (Chinese Taipei) Lee Sheng-mu / Tsai Chia-hsin
7. (Japan) Takeshi Kamura / Keigo Sonoda
8. (Japan) Hirokatsu Hashimoto / Noriyasu Hirata

=== Top half ===
First Round
1	(Indonesia) M Ahsan (Indonesia) H Setiawan	21	21
Q2	(Japan) Y Igarashi (Japan) H Shimono	12	12
(Hong Kong) Chan Y L (Hong Kong) Lee C H	14	18
PFQ	(Japan) Y Komatsuzaki (Japan) H Takeuchi	21	21
6	(Chinese Taipei) Lee S-m (Chinese Taipei) Tsai C-h	w	/	o
(China) Li G (China) Zhang N
4	(China) Liu XL (China) Qiu ZH	23	19	21
(Japan) K Kazuno (Japan) K Yamada	21	21	16
(India) M Attri (India) B Sumeeth Reddy	21	21
(Japan) H Saeki (Japan) R Taohata	17	15
7	(Japan) T Kamura (Japan) K Sonoda	21	21
(South Korea) Jun B-c (South Korea) Kang J-w	15	12
(New Zealand) K Dennerly-Minturn (New Zealand) O Leydon-Davis	13	13
(China) Kang J (China) Liu C	21	21

Second Round
1	(Indonesia) M Ahsan (Indonesia) H Setiawan	21	21
(Japan) Y Komatsuzaki (Japan) H Takeuchi	19	19
6	(Chinese Taipei) Lee S-m (Chinese Taipei) Tsai C-h	21	21
Q4	(Japan) T Hoki (Japan) Y Kobayashi	13	15
4	(China) Liu XL (China) Qiu ZH	21	21
(India) M Attri (India) B. Sumeeth Reddy	17	16
7	(Japan) T Kamura (Japan) K Sonoda	19	14
(China) Kang J (China) Liu C	21	21

Quarterfinals
1	(Indonesia) M Ahsan (Indonesia) H Setiawan	21	21
6	(Chinese Taipei) Lee S-m (Chinese Taipei) Tsai C-h	11	17
4	(China) Liu XL (China) Qiu ZH
(China) Kang J (China) Liu C	w	/	o

Semifinals
1	(Indonesia) M Ahsan (Indonesia) H Setiawan	21	18	21
(China) Kang J (China) Liu C	12	21	18

=== Bottom half ===
First Round
(Indonesia) Y S Dasuki (Indonesia) H A Gunawan	21	21
(United States) P Chew (United States) S Pongnairat	17	14
(Thailand) S Prapakamol (Thailand) P Vilailak	14	10
8	(Japan) H Hashimoto (Japan) N Hirata	21	21
(South Korea) Bae K-y (South Korea) Jung J-w	14	13
(China) Chai B (China) Hong W	21	21
(South Korea) Kim D-e (South Korea) Dae S-k	13	19
3	(Japan) H Endo (Japan) K Hayakawa	21	21
(Denmark) M Conrad-Petersen (Denmark) M Pieler Kolding	21	21
(Indonesia) M F Gideon (Indonesia) M Kido	16	15
PFQ	(Japan) K Matsui (Japan) K Miura	8	10
5	(Indonesia) A Pratama (Indonesia) R A Saputro	21	21
(Chinese Taipei) Lu C-p (Chinese Taipei) Wang C-h	19	21	19
Q3	(Japan) T Kurose (Japan) S Zeniya	21	18	21
(Chinese Taipei) Liang J-w (Chinese Taipei) Liao K-h	12	8
2	(Denmark) M Boe (Denmark) C Mogensen	21	21

Second Round
(Indonesia) Y S Dasuki (Indonesia) H A Gunawan	21	14	15
8	(Japan) H Hashimoto (Japan) N Hirata	18	21	21
(China) Chai B (China) Hong W	21	21
(Japan) H Endo (Japan) K Hayakawa	14	12
(Denmark) M Conrad-Petersen (Denmark) M Pieler Kolding	21	22
5	(Indonesia) A Pratama (Indonesia) R A Saputro	14	20
(Japan) T Kurose (Japan) S Zeniya	15	11
2	(Denmark) M Boe (Denmark) C Mogensen	21	21

Quarterfinals
8	(Japan) H Hashimoto (Japan) N Hirata	15	21	15
(China) Chai B (China) Hong W	21	17	21
(Denmark) M Conrad-Petersen (Denmark) M Pieler Kolding	16	19
2	(Denmark) M Boe (Denmark) C Mogensen	21	21

Semifinals
(China) Chai B (China) Hong W	21	15	21
2	(Denmark) M Boe (Denmark) C Mogensen	11	21	19

=== Finals ===
Semifinals
1	(Indonesia) Mohammad Ahsan (Indonesia) Hendra Setiawan	21	18	21
(China) Kang Jun (China) Liu Cheng	12	21	18
(China) Chai Biao (China) Hong Wei	21	15	21
2	(Denmark) Mathias Boe (Denmark) Carsten Mogensen	11	21	19

Final
1	(Indonesia) Mohammad Ahsan (Indonesia) Hendra Setiawan	22	21
(China) Chai Biao (China) Hong Wei	20	16

== Women's doubles ==
=== Seeds ===
1. (China) Ma Jin / Tang Jinhua
2. (Japan) Misaki Matsutomo / Ayaka Takahashi
3. (Denmark) Christinna Pedersen / Kamilla Rytter Juhl
4. (Indonesia) Pia Zebadiah Bernadet / Rizki Amelia Pradipta
5. (China) Bao Yixin / Zhong Qianxin
6. (Japan) Miyuki Maeda / Satoko Suetsuna
7. (Thailand) Duanganong Aroonkesorn / Kunchala Voravichitchaikul
8. (Hong Kong) Poon Lok Yan / Tse Ying Suet

=== Top half ===
First Round
(Chinese Taipei) Wang P-r (Chinese Taipei) Yu W-k	19	15
(Japan) Y Miki (Japan) K Yonemoto	21	21
5	(China) Bao YX (China) Zhong QX	21	21
(Japan) A Higshino (Japan) A Matsuda	17	7
(Thailand) N Saengchota (Thailand) S Suwannakitborihan	16	12
(Indonesia) G R Imawan (Indonesia) T R Nuraidah	21	21
(Indonesia) A P L Variella (Indonesia) V Marissa	21	17	12
(Japan) A Kugo (Japan) Y Miyauchi	14	21	21
6	(Japan) M Maeda (Japan) S Suetsuna	21	12	14
(Indonesia) N K Maheswari (Indonesia) G Polii	19	21	21
(Chinese Taipei) Cheng W-h (Chinese Taipei) Hsieh P-c	w	/	o
(Japan) N Fukuman (Japan) K Yonao

Second Round
1	(China) Ma J (China) Tang JH	21	19	21
(Japan) Y Miki (Japan) K Yonemoto	10	21	14
5	(China) Bao YX (China) Zhong QX	21	21
(Indonesia) G R Imawan (Indonesia) T R Nuraidah	14	13
4	(Indonesia) P Z Bernadet (Indonesia) R A Pradipta	21	19	21
(Japan) A Kugo (Japan) Y Miyauchi	19	21	17
(Indonesia) N K Maheswari (Indonesia) G Polii	15	21
(Chinese Taipei) Cheng W-h (Chinese Taipei) Hsieh P-c	21	23

Quarterfinals
1	(China) Ma J (China) Tang JH	21	21
5	(China) Bao YX (China) Zhong QX	15	5
4	(Indonesia) P Z Bernadet (Indonesia) R A Pradipta	21	22
(Chinese Taipei) Cheng W-h (Chinese Taipei) Hsieh P-c	12	20

Semifinals
1	(China) Ma J (China) Tang JH	17	21	21
4	(Indonesia) P Z Bernadet (Indonesia) R A Pradipta	21	14	12

=== Bottom half ===
First Round
(Canada) N Grether (Canada) C Reid	9	13
(China) Ou DN (China) Tang YT	21	21
(Japan) M Aratama (Japan) M Taruno	18	21	21
7	(Thailand) D Aroonkesorn (Thailand) K Voravichitchaikul	21	16	14
(Thailand) S Amitrapai (Thailand) N Lam	15	19
(Japan) C Hoshi (Japan) A Sakuramoto	21	21
(Japan) Y Fukushima (Japan) R Kakiiwa	11	13
3	(Denmark) C Pedersen (Denmark) K Rytter Juhl	21	21
(New Zealand) A Rankin (New Zealand) M Stapleton	w	/	o
(China) Cheng S (China) Zhao YL
(Japan) A Doi (Japan) M Naito	21	18	11
8	(Hong Kong) Poon L Y (Hong Kong) Tse Y S	10	21	21
(Malaysia) Ng H E (Malaysia) Ng H L	21	21
(South Korea) Cho H-k (South Korea) Park S-y	17	17

Second Round
(China) Ou DN (China) Tang YT	21	21
(Japan) M Aratama (Japan) M Taruno	16	17
(Japan) C Hoshi (Japan) A Sakuramoto	11	8
3	(Denmark) C Pedersen (Denmark) K Rytter Juhl	21	21
(New Zealand) A Rankin (New Zealand) M Stapleton	11	15
8	(Hong Kong) Poon L Y (Hong Kong) Tse Y S	21	21
(Malaysia) Ng H E (Malaysia) Ng H L	13	15
2	(Japan) M Matsutomo (Japan) A Takahashi	21	21

Quarterfinals
(China) Ou DN (China) Tang YT	19	21
3	(Denmark) C Pedersen (Denmark) K Rytter Juhl	21	23
8	(Hong Kong) Poon L Y (Hong Kong) Tse Y S	17	15
2	(Japan) M Matsutomo (Japan) A Takahashi	21	21

Semifinals
3	(Denmark) C Pedersen (Denmark) K Rytter Juhl	21	21
2	(Japan) M Matsutomo (Japan) A Takahashi	16	14

=== Finals ===
Semifinals
1	(China) Ma Jin (China) Tang Jinhua	17	21	21
4	(Indonesia) P Z Bernadet (Indonesia) Rizki Amelia Pradipta	21	14	12
3	(Denmark) Christinna Pedersen (Denmark) Kamilla Rytter Juhl	21	21
2	(Japan) Misaki Matsutomo (Japan) Ayaka Takahashi	16	14

Final
1	(China) Ma Jin (China) Tang Jinhua	21	21
3	(Denmark) Christinna Pedersen (Denmark) Kamilla Rytter Juhl	11	14

== Mixed doubles ==
=== Seeds ===
1. (China) Xu Chen / Ma Jin
2. (China) Zhang Nan / Zhao Yunlei
3. (Denmark) Joachim Fischer Nielsen / Christinna Pedersen
4. (Malaysia) Chan Peng Soon / Goh Liu Ying
5. (Indonesia) Muhammad Rijal / Debby Susanto
6. (Thailand) Sudket Prapakamol / Saralee Thungthongkam
7. (Indonesia) Markis Kido / Pia Zebadiah Bernadet
8. (Indonesia) Riky Widianto / Richi Puspita Dili

=== Top half ===
First Round
(Japan) H Shimono (Japan) W Nagahara	21	21
(United States) P Chew (United States) J Subandhi	17	14
6	(Thailand) S Prapakamol (Thailand) S Thungthongkam	21	11	15
(China) Chai B (China) Tang JH	15	21	21
(Hong Kong) Lee C H (Hong Kong) Chau H W	21	21
(Japan) K Hayakawa (Japan) M Matsutomo	16	14
3	(Denmark) J Fischer Nielsen (Denmark) C Pedersen	21	21
(Japan) Y Komatsuzaki (Japan) Y Nishiyama	11	12
(Japan) H Hashimoto (Japan) M Maeda	16	21	20
(Indonesia) M F Gideon (Indonesia) R A Pradipta	21	19	22
8	(Indonesia) R Widianto (Indonesia) R P Dili	21	21
(South Korea) Bae K-y (South Korea) Cho H-k	17	19
(Japan) R Taohata (Japan) N Fukuman	21	16	12
(Indonesia) P Jordan (Indonesia) V Marissa	13	21	21

Second Round
1	(China) Xu C (China) Ma J	21	21
(Japan) H Shimono (Japan) W Nagahara	13	10
(China) Chai B (China) Tang JH	21	21
(Hong Kong) Lee C H (Hong Kong) Chau H W	12	19
3	(Denmark) J Fischer Nielsen (Denmark) C Pedersen	21	21
(Indonesia) M F Gideon (Indonesia) R A Pradipta	9	12
8	(Indonesia) R Widianto (Indonesia) R P Dili	21	17	18
(Indonesia) P Jordan (Indonesia) V Marissa	11	21	21

Quarterfinals
1	(China) Xu C (China) Ma J	21	21
(China) Chai B (China) Tang JH	8	14
3	(Denmark) J Fischer Nielsen (Denmark) C Pedersen	21	19	21
(Indonesia) P Jordan (Indonesia) V Marissa	10	21	10

Semifinals
1	(China) Xu C (China) Ma J	21	23
3	(Denmark) J Fischer Nielsen (Denmark) C Pedersen	17	21

=== Bottom half ===
First Round
(China) Kang J (China) Ou DN	w	/	o
(Denmark) M Pieler Kolding (Denmark) K Rytter Juhl
(Japan) M Takashima (Japan) K Goto	10	18
7	(Indonesia) M Kido (Indonesia) P Z Bernadet	21	21
(Japan) K Ito (Japan) Y Miyauchi	10	16
(China) Liu C (China) Bao YX	21	21
(Thailand) P Vilailak (Thailand) K Voravichitchaikul	18	17
4	(Malaysia) Chan P S (Malaysia) Goh L Y	21	21
(South Korea) Kang J-w (South Korea) Park S-y	15	13
(Japan) T Inoue (Japan) A Takahashi	21	21
(Denmark) A Kristiansen (Denmark) J Houmann
5	(Indonesia) M Rijal (Indonesia) D Susanto	w	/	o
(Hong Kong) Chan Y L (Hong Kong) Tse Y S	21	21
(Japan) T Kamura (Japan) K Yonemoto	16	12
(Japan) T Hoki (Japan) A Sakuramoto	8	3
2	(China) Zhang N (China) Zhao YL	21	21

Second Round
(China) Kang J (China) Ou DN	16	13
7	(Indonesia) M Kido (Indonesia) P Z Bernadet	21	21
(China) Liu C (China) Bao YX	21	21
4	(Malaysia) Chan P S (Malaysia) Goh L Y	8	16
(Japan) T Inoue (Japan) A Takahashi	21	21
5	(Indonesia) M Rijal (Indonesia) D Susanto	18	14
(Hong Kong) Chan Y L (Hong Kong) Tse Y S	14	15
2	(China) Zhang N (China) Zhao YL	21	21

Quarterfinals
7	(Indonesia) M Kido (Indonesia) P Z Bernadet	21	19	19
(China) Liu C (China) Bao YX	17	21	21
(Japan) T Inoue (Japan) A Takahashi	15	20
2	(China) Zhang N (China) Zhao YL	21	22

Semifinals
(China) Liu C (China) Bao YX	9	8
2	(China) Zhang N (China) Zhao YL	21	21

=== Finals ===
Semifinals
1	(China) Xu Chen (China) Ma Jin	21	23
3	(Denmark) Joachim Fischer Nielsen (Denmark) Christinna Pedersen	17	21
(China) Liu Cheng (China) Bao Yixin	9	9
2	(China) Zhang Nan (China) Zhao Yunlei	21	21

Final
1	(China) Xu Chen (China) Ma Jin
2	(China) Zhang Nan (China) Zhao Yunlei	w	/	o
