= 2013 U.S. Open Grand Prix Gold =

Tournament details
- Dates: July 8, 2013 - July 13, 2013
- Total prize money: US$120,000
- Venue: Orange County Badminton Club
- Location: Orange, United States

The 2013 U.S. Open Grand Prix Gold was the seventh grand prix gold and grand prix tournament of the 2013 BWF Grand Prix Gold and Grand Prix. The tournament was held in Orange County Badminton Club, Orange, United States July 8 until July 13, 2013 and had a total purse of $120,000.

== Men's singles ==
=== Seeds ===
1. (Thailand) Boonsak Ponsana (semi-final)
2. (Hong Kong) Hu Yun (quarter-final)
3. (Vietnam) Nguyen Tien Minh (champion)
4. (Hong Kong) Wong Wing Ki (final)
5. (Japan) Takuma Ueda (quarter-final)
6. (India) Rajah Menuri Venkata Gurusaidutt (withdrew)
7. (Japan) Kazumasa Sakai (third round)
8. (Chinese Taipei) Hsu Jen-hao (quarter-final)
9. (Sri Lanka) Niluka Karunaratne (withdrew)
10. (Netherlands) Eric Pang (second round)
11. (Malaysia) Tan Chun Seang (third round)
12. (Malaysia) Ramdan Misbun (third round)
13. (Japan) Kento Momota (semi-final)
14. (Thailand) Suppanyu Avihingsanon (third round)
15. (Sweden) Henri Hurskainen (third round)
16. (Denmark) Joachim Persson (third round)

=== Finals ===
Quarterfinals
1	(Thailand) Boonsak Ponsana	21	17	21
5	(Japan) Takuma Ueda	12	21	8
4	(Hong Kong) Wong Wing Ki	21	19	21
8	(Chinese Taipei) Hsu Jen-hao	13	21	12
(United States) Sattawat Pongnairat	10	10
3	(Vietnam) Nguyen Tien Minh	21	21
13	(Japan) Kento Momota	21	20	23
2	(Hong Kong) Hu Yun	14	22	21

Semifinals
1	(Thailand) Boonsak Ponsana	17	21	12
4	(Hong Kong) Wong Wing Ki	21	16	21
3	(Vietnam) Nguyen Tien Minh	21	21
13	(Japan) Kento Momota	12	8

Final
4	(Hong Kong) Wong Wing Ki	21	17	18
3	(Vietnam) Nguyen Tien Minh	18	21	21

=== Top half ===
==== Section 1 ====
First Round
1	(Thailand) B Ponsana	21	21
(Brazil) R Salles	4	4
(Mexico) A Hernández	21	12	21
(United States) S Phanpuchara	18	21	17
15	(Sweden) H Hurskainen	21	15	21
(Thailand) P Thongnuam	19	21	19
(Canada) T Ng	19	15
(India) A Bhat	21	21

Second Round
1	(Thailand) B Ponsana	21	21
(Mexico) A Hernández	12	7
15	(Sweden) H Hurskainen	21	21
(India) A Bhat	18	13

Third Round
1	(Thailand) B Ponsana	21	21
15	(Sweden) H Hurskainen	15	19

==== Section 2 ====
First Round
5	(Japan) T Ueda	21	21
(Mexico) A Quadri	6	7
(United States) H Shu
BYE
10	(Netherlands) E Pang	21	21
Q3	(Canada) A Zhuang	12	9
(Austria) L Wraber	21	12
(Czech Republic) P Koukal	23	21

Second Round
5	(Japan) T Ueda	21	21
(United States) H Shu	9	14
10	(Netherlands) E Pang	10	11
(Czech Republic) P Koukal	21	21

Third Round
5	(Japan) T Ueda	21	21
(Czech Republic) P Koukal	18	18

==== Section 3 ====
First Round
4	(Hong Kong) Wong WK	21	21
(United States) G.J. Watts	12	9
Q4	(United States) T Lam	16	7
(Thailand) K Phetpradab	21	21
12	(Malaysia) R Misbun	21	21
(United States) C Stensland	10	8
(Philippines) M Alcala	19	21	21
(Austria) R Gnedt	21	11	14

Second Round
4	(Hong Kong) Wong WK	21	22
(Thailand) K Phetpradab	15	20
12	(Malaysia) R Misbun	21	21
(Philippines) M Alcala	11	12

Third Round
4	(Hong Kong) Wong WK	21	21
12	(Malaysia) R Misbun	11	13

==== Section 4 ====
First Round
8	(Chinese Taipei) Hsu J-h	21	21
(India) A Sridhar	19	12
(Malaysia) Z Zulkiffli	21	21
(Mexico) L Muñoz	13	12
16	(Denmark) J Persson	21	21
(Austria) W Gnedt	18	5
(England) M Spencer-Smith	15	4
(Austria) M Lahnsteiner	21	21

Second Round
8	(Chinese Taipei) Hsu J-h	18	21	21
(Malaysia) Z Zulkiffli	21	17	13
16	(Denmark) J Persson	21	21
(Austria) M Lahnsteiner	13	15

Third Round
8	(Chinese Taipei) Hsu J-h	21	21
16	(Denmark) J Persson	13	19

=== Bottom half ===
==== Section 5 ====
First Round
Q2	(Canada) T Chiu	16	18
(United States) A Amphie	21	21
(United States) S Pongnairat
9	(Sri Lanka) N Karunaratne	wo
(United States) R Chew	15	16
Q5	(Canada) Kai D	21	21
(Philippines) A Gadi	21	21
PFQ	(Czech Republic) A Mendrek	10	16

Second Round
(United States) A Amphie	14	21	13
(United States) S Pongnairat	21	17	21
Q5	(Canada) Kai D	10	18
(Philippines) A Gadi	21	21

Third Round
(United States) S Pongnairat	19	21	21
(Philippines) A Gadi	21	11	15

==== Section 6 ====
First Round
(Canada) S Shatenko	13	21	13
(Austria) D Obernosterer	21	17	21
(United States) B Seguin	21	12	7
11	(Malaysia) Tan CS	12	21	21
Q8	(United States) C Lin	19	21	21
(Trinidad and Tobago) N Bonkowsky	21	12	17
(Mexico) A López	8	10
3	(Vietnam) Nguyen TM	21	21

Second Round
(Austria) D Obernosterer	11	15
11	(Malaysia) Tan CS	21	21
Q8	(United States) C Lin	6	6
3	(Vietnam) Nguyen TM	21	21

Third Round
11	(Malaysia) Tan CS	16	21	8
3	(Vietnam) Nguyen TM	21	12	21

==== Section 7 ====
First Round
(Denmark) C Thomsen	21	21
(Peru) A Corpancho	11	7
(Canada) A D'Souza	17	15
13	(Japan) K Momota	21	21
(United States) Lee HL	24	15
(Japan) R Takeshita	26	21
(Scotland) A Casey	12	9
7	(Japan) K Sakai	21	21

Second Round
(Denmark) C Thomsen	13	21	8
13	(Japan) K Momota	21	16	21
(Japan) R Takeshita	21	13	13
7	(Japan) K Sakai	11	21	21

Third Round
13	(Japan) K Momota	22	21	21
7	(Japan) K Sakai	24	17	16

==== Section 8 ====
First Round
(Chinese Taipei) Wan C-h	21	21
Q7	(Canada) R Giesbrecht	19	12
Q6	(Philippines) G Villanueva	6	11
14	(Thailand) S Avihingsanon	21	21
(Singapore) A Chen	14	21	21
(New Zealand) J Wu	21	16	10
(United States) T Pojanakanokporn	10	8^{r}
2	(Hong Kong) Hu Y	21	18

Second Round
(Chinese Taipei) Wan C-h	17	15
14	(Thailand) S Avihingsanon	21	21
(Singapore) A Chen	18	21	11
2	(Hong Kong) Hu Y	21	15	21

Third Round
14	(Thailand) S Avihingsanon	15	21	13
2	(Hong Kong) Hu Y	21	18	21

== Women's singles ==
=== Seeds ===
1. (Thailand) Nichaon Jindapon (semi-final)
2. (Hong Kong) Yip Pui Yin (quarter-final)
3. (Thailand) Sapsiree Taerattanachai (champion)
4. (Spain) Carolina Marín (first round)
5. (Japan) Yui Hashimoto (first round)
6. (Hong Kong) Chan Tsz Ka (first round)
7. (Japan) Kaori Imabeppu (semi-final)
8. (Singapore) Xing Aiying (quarter-final)

=== Finals ===
Semifinals
1	(Thailand) Nichaon Jindapon	21	17	12
(Japan) Yuka Kusunose	13	21	21
3	(Thailand) Sapsiree Taerattanachai	21	21
7	(Japan) Kaori Imabeppu	19	13

Final
(Japan) Yuka Kusunose	12	13
3	(Thailand) Sapsiree Taerattanachai	21	21

=== Top half ===
==== Section 1 ====
First Round
1	(Thailand) N Jindapon	21	21
(Canada) J Ko	7	5
Q4	(Philippines) M Alcala	21	21
(Mexico) C González	9	12
6	(Hong Kong) Chan TK	21	15	17
(Japan) K Ito	17	21	21
(Switzerland) S Jaquet	21	14	21
(Canada) N Grether	7	21	4

Second Round
1	(Thailand) N Jindapon	21	21
Q4	(Philippines) M Alcala	17	13
(Japan) K Ito	22	26
(Switzerland) S Jaquet	20	24

Quarterfinals
1	(Thailand) N Jindapon	21	21
(Japan) K Ito	19	18

==== Section 2 ====
First Round
4	(Spain) C Marín	20	13
(United States) B Zhang	22	21
(Japan) Y Kusunose	21	21
(Canada) C Reid	8	15
5	(Japan) Y Hashimoto	17	17
(Thailand) S Ponsana	21	21
(Vietnam) Vu TT	21	21
Q3	(United States) C Yang	8	1

Second Round
(United States) B Zhang	18	24	18
(Japan) Y Kusunose	21	22	21
(Thailand) S Ponsana	21	21
(Vietnam) Vu TT	18	16

Quarterfinals
(Japan) Y Kusunose	21	21
(Thailand) S Ponsana	18	16

=== Bottom half ===
==== Section 3 ====
First Round
Q1	(Japan) A Mine	21	21
(Canada) C Tsai	15	10
(France) P Le Buhanic	19	12
8	(Singapore) Xing AY	21	21
(Spain) B Corrales	21	21
Q2	(Thailand) N Saengchote	17	16
(Japan) S Sato	22	20	15
3	(Thailand) S Taerattanachai	20	22	21

Second Round
Q1	(Japan) A Mine	12	19
8	(Singapore) Xing AY	21	21
(Spain) B Corrales	14	9
3	(Thailand) S Taerattanachai	21	21

Quarterfinals
8	(Singapore) Xing AY	21	11	14
3	(Thailand) S Taerattanachai	16	21	21

==== Section 4 ====
First Round
(England) F Chapman	19	21	21
(Austria) S Prutsch	21	14	14
(Chinese Taipei) Cheng C-y	11	16
7	(Japan) K Imabeppu	21	21
(United States) J Subandhi	21	21
(Mexico) N González	12	10
(Canada) M Li	22	14	10
2	(Hong Kong) Yip PY	20	21	21

Second Round
(England) F Chapman	16	8
7	(Japan) K Imabeppu	21	21
(United States) J Subandhi	14	16
2	(Hong Kong) Yip PY	21	21

Quarterfinals
7	(Japan) K Imabeppu	21	20	21
2	(Hong Kong) Yip PY	18	22	19

== Men's doubles ==
=== Seeds ===
1. (Japan) Takeshi Kamura / Keigo Sonoda (champion)
2. (Thailand) Maneepong Jongjit / Nipitphon Puangpuapech (semi-final)
3. (Japan) Hiroyuki Saeki / Ryota Taohata (withdrew)
4. (United States) Phillip Chew / Sattawat Pongnairat (first round)
5. (Netherlands) Ruud Bosch / Koen Ridder (quarter-final)
6. (Canada) Adrian Liu / Derrick Ng (second round)
7. (Chinese Taipei) Liang Jui-wei / Liao Kuan-hao (final)
8. (Netherlands) Jacco Arends / Jelle Maas (second round)

=== Finals ===
Semifinals
1	(Japan) Takeshi Kamura (Japan) Keigo Sonoda	14	21	21
(Thailand) Wannawat Ampunsuwan (Thailand) Patiphat Chalardchaleam	21	17	6
7	(Chinese Taipei) Liang Jui-wei (Chinese Taipei) Liao Kuan-hao	15	21	23
2	(Thailand) Maneepong Jongjit (Thailand) Nipitphon Puangpuapech	21	17	21

Final
1	(Japan) Takeshi Kamura (Japan) Keigo Sonoda	21	27
7	(Chinese Taipei) Liang Jui-wei (Chinese Taipei) Liao Kuan-hao	16	25

=== Top half ===
==== Section 1 ====
First Round
1	(Japan) T Kamura (Japan) K Sonoda	21	21
(Chinese Taipei) Hsu J-h (Chinese Taipei) Wan C-h	13	16
(United States) R Chew (United States) C Stensland	13	12
Q3	(China) Pei TY (China) Shi LF	21	21
6	(Canada) A Liu (Canada) D Ng	21	21
(Czech Republic) A Mendrek (Czech Republic) M Svetnicka	8	11
(Hong Kong) Chan YL (Hong Kong) Lee CH	17	21	21
(New Zealand) K Dennerly-Minturn (New Zealand) O Leydon-Davis	21	19	9

Second Round
1	(Japan) T Kamura (Japan) K Sonoda	21	21
Q3	(China) Pei TY (China) Shi LF	11	13
6	(Canada) A Liu (Canada) D Ng	17	18
(Hong Kong) Chan YL (Hong Kong) Lee CH	21	21

Quarterfinals
1	(Japan) T Kamura (Japan) K Sonoda	21	13	21
(Hong Kong) Chan YL (Hong Kong) Lee CH	13	21	13

==== Section 2 ====
First Round
4	(United States) P Chew (United States) S Pongnairat	11	11
(Thailand) B Issara (Thailand) P Vilailak	21	21
(Thailand) W Ampunsuwan (Thailand) P Chalardchaleam	21	21
Q1	(Canada) R Giesbrecht (Canada) A Zhuang	3	9
8	(Netherlands) J Arends (Netherlands) J Maas	21	17	21
PFQ	(China) Tang SH (China) Wang TY	11	21	12
Q2	(China) Wang YL (China) Zhang NY	21	21
PFQ	(Mexico) A Hernández (Mexico) A Quadri	4	7

Second Round
(Thailand) B Issara (Thailand) P Vilailak	18	22	11
(Thailand) W Ampunsuwan (Thailand) P Chalardchaleam	21	20	21
8	(Netherlands) J Arends (Netherlands) J Maas	15	21	19
Q2	(China) Wang YL (China) Zhang NY	21	18	21

Quarterfinals
(Thailand) W Ampunsuwan (Thailand) P Chalardchaleam	23	21
Q2	(China) Wang YL (China) Zhang NY	21	18

=== Bottom half ===
==== Section 3 ====
First Round
(Mexico) A López (Mexico) L Muñoz	10	17
(United States) K Emerick (United States) D Truong	21	21
(United States) C Lin (United States) M Lin	13	11
7	(Chinese Taipei) Liang J-w (Chinese Taipei) Liao K-h	21	21
Q4	(United States) S Phanphucara (United States) G.J. Watts	21	15	13
(Canada) A D'Souza (Canada) S Shatenko	17	21	21
(Australia) R Middleton (Australia) R Smith	21	21
PFQ	(Canada) Chen L (Canada) Kai D	17	13

Second Round
(United States) K Emerick (United States) D Truong	15	11
7	(Chinese Taipei) Liang J-w (Chinese Taipei) Liao K-h	21	21
(Canada) A D'Souza (Canada) S Shatenko	13	9
(Australia) R Middleton (Australia) R Smith	21	21

Quarterfinals
7	(Chinese Taipei) Liang J-w (Chinese Taipei) Liao K-h	21	21
(Australia) R Middleton (Australia) R Smith	18	13

==== Section 4 ====
First Round
(United States) T Gunawan (United States) C Christianto	21	21
(Peru) A Corpancho (Brazil) R Salles	6	8
(Austria) R Gnedt (Austria) W Gnedt	10	3
5	(Netherlands) R Bosch (Netherlands) K Ridder	21	21
(Philippines) K Asuncion (Philippines) A Gadi	21	16	19
(Austria) J Koch (Denmark) C Thomsen	16	21	21
(Canada) K Li (Canada) N Yakura	10	19
2	(Thailand) M Jongjit (Thailand) N Puangpuapech	21	21

Second Round
(United States) T Gunawan (United States) C Christianto	19	16
5	(Netherlands) R Bosch (Netherlands) K Ridder	21	21
(Austria) J Koch (Denmark) C Thomsen	16	10
2	(Thailand) M Jongjit (Thailand) N Puangpuapech	21	21

Quarterfinals
5	(Netherlands) R Bosch (Netherlands) K Ridder	16	15
2	(Thailand) M Jongjit (Thailand) N Puangpuapech	21	21

== Women's doubles ==
=== Seeds ===
1. (China) Bao Yixin / Zhong Qianxin (champion)
2. (Japan) Yuriko Miki / Koharu Yonemoto (semi-final)
3. (Canada) Nicole Grether / Charmaine Reid (second round)
4. (Macau) Wang Rong / Zhang Zhibo (withdrew)

=== Finals ===
Semifinals
1	(China) Bao Yixin (China) Zhong Qianxin	21	21
(Japan) Reika Kakiiwa (Japan) Miyuki Maeda	18	19
(China) Yu Xiaohan (China) Huang Yaqiong	21	21
2	(Japan) Yuriko Miki (Japan) Koharu Yonemoto	12	9

Final
1	(China) Bao Yixin (China) Zhong Qianxin	21	24
(China) Yu Xiaohan (China) Huang Yaqiong	17	22

=== Top half ===
==== Section 1 ====
First Round
1	(China) Bao YX (China) Zhong QX
BYE
(Canada) G Gao (Canada) M Li
BYE
(China) Du P (China) Xiong MJ
BYE
(United States) I Wang (United States) R Wang	12	19
(Chinese Taipei) Cheng W-h (Chinese Taipei) Hsieh P-c	21	21

Second Round
1	(China) Bao YX (China) Zhong QX
(Canada) G Gao (Canada) M Li	wo
(China) Du P (China) Xiong MJ	16	22	21
(Chinese Taipei) Cheng W-h (Chinese Taipei) Hsieh P-c	21	20	11

Quarterfinals
1	(China) Bao YX (China) Zhong QX	21	21
(China) Du P (China) Xiong MJ	17	10

==== Section 2 ====
First Round
4	(Macau) Wang R (Macau) Zhang ZB
BYE
(Japan) R Kakiiwa (Japan) M Maeda	21	21
(New Zealand) K Gregory (New Zealand) S Leydon-Davis	7	4
(Netherlands) S Barning (Netherlands) I Tabeling
BYE
(France) L Choinet (Thailand) S Ponsana	21	21
(Philippines) M Alcala (Philippines) F Lamigo	11	9

Second Round
4	(Macau) Wang R (Macau) Zhang ZB	wo
(Japan) R Kakiiwa (Japan) M Maeda
(Netherlands) S Barning (Netherlands) I Tabeling	21	21
(France) L Choinet (Thailand) S Ponsana	18	17

Quarterfinals
(Japan) R Kakiiwa (Japan) M Maeda	21	21
(Netherlands) S Barning (Netherlands) I Tabeling	19	17

=== Bottom half ===
==== Section 3 ====
First Round
(China) Yu XH (China) Huang YQ	21	21
(Chinese Taipei) Chien Y-c (Chinese Taipei) Wu T-j	12	10
BYE
(Netherlands) E Muskens (Netherlands) S Piek
(United States) E Lee (United States) P Obanana	21	21
(Switzerland) S Jaquet (France) P Le Buhanic	13	15
BYE
3	(Canada) N Grether (Canada) C Reid

Second Round
(China) Yu XH (China) Huang YQ	23	17	21
(Netherlands) E Muskens (Netherlands) S Piek	21	21	19
(United States) E Lee (United States) P Obanana	21	21
3	(Canada) N Grether (Canada) C Reid	13	16

Quarterfinals
(China) Yu XH (China) Huang YQ	21	21
(United States) E Lee (United States) P Obanana	13	8

==== Section 4 ====
First Round
(Mexico) C González (Mexico) N González
(Philippines) J De Vera (Philippines) K Salatan	wo
BYE
(United States) A Xu (United States) K Xu
(Chinese Taipei) Cheng C-y (Canada) C Tsai	21	21
(United States) P Phongsavithas (United States) V Phongsavithas	5	17
BYE
2	(Japan) Y Miki (Japan) K Yonemoto

Second Round
(Mexico) C González (Mexico) N González	17	6
(United States) A Xu (United States) K Xu	21	21
(Chinese Taipei) Cheng C-y (Canada) C Tsai	18	16
2	(Japan) Y Miki (Japan) K Yonemoto	21	21

Quarterfinals
(United States) A Xu (United States) K Xu	5	11
2	(Japan) Y Miki (Japan) K Yonemoto	21	21

== Mixed doubles ==
=== Seeds ===
1. (Hong Kong) Lee Chun Hei / Chau Hoi Wah (champion)
2. (United States) Phillip Chew / Jamie Subandhi (second round)
3. (Netherlands) Jorrit de Ruiter / Samantha Barning (quarter-final)
4. (Japan) Takeshi Kamura / Koharu Yonemoto (quarter-final)
5. (Japan) Ryota Taohata / Miyuki Maeda (withdrew)
6. (United States) Lee Hock Lai / (Canada) Phyllis Chan (first round)
7. (Canada) Nyl Yakura / Grace Gao (withdrew)
8. (Mexico) Lino Munoz / Cynthia Gonzalez (first round)

=== Finals ===
Semifinals
1	(Hong Kong) Lee Chun Hei (Hong Kong) Chau Hoi Wah	21	21
(China) Zhang Ningyi (China) Du Peng	9	18
(Netherlands) Jacco Arends (Netherlands) Selena Piek	17	22	18
(China) Wang Yilu (China) Huang Yaqiong	21	20	21

Final
1	(Hong Kong) Lee Chun Hei (Hong Kong) Chau Hoi Wah	21	21
(China) Wang Yilu (China) Huang Yaqiong	8	14

=== Top half ===
==== Section 1 ====
First Round
1	(Hong Kong) Lee CH (Hong Kong) Chau HW	21	21
(Philippines) G Villanueva (Philippines) F Lamigo	9	11
(Netherlands) J Maas (Netherlands) I Tabeling	18	11
(Chinese Taipei) Liang J-w (Chinese Taipei) Wu T-j	21	21
5	(Japan) R Taohata (Japan) M Maeda	wo
(United States) T Gunawan (United States) E Lee
(United States) D Schoppe (United States) J Yee	10	1
(Netherlands) K Ridder (France) L Choinet	21	21

Second Round
1	(Hong Kong) Lee CH (Hong Kong) Chau HW	21	11	21
(Chinese Taipei) Liang J-w (Chinese Taipei) Wu T-j	12	21	12
(United States) T Gunawan (United States) E Lee	21	21
(Netherlands) K Ridder (France) L Choinet	8	13

Quarterfinals
1	(Hong Kong) Lee CH (Hong Kong) Chau HW	21	21
(United States) T Gunawan (United States) E Lee	18	12

==== Section 2 ====
First Round
3	(Netherlands) J de Ruiter (Netherlands) S Barning
(China) Chen ZF (China) Xiong MJ	wo
(United States) K Emerick (United States) T Hoang
(China) Lu K (China) Yu XH	wo
8	(Mexico) L Muñoz (Mexico) C González	11	10
(China) Zhang NY (China) Du P	21	21
(New Zealand) O Leydon-Davis (New Zealand) S Leydon-Davis	21	24
(Canada) A Liu (Canada) J Ko	18	22

Second Round
3	(Netherlands) J de Ruiter (Netherlands) S Barning	21	21
(United States) K Emerick (United States) T Hoang	10	16
(China) Zhang NY (China) Du P	21	21
(New Zealand) O Leydon-Davis (New Zealand) S Leydon-Davis	15	13

Quarterfinals
3	(Netherlands) J de Ruiter (Netherlands) S Barning	15	16
(China) Zhang NY (China) Du P	21	21

=== Bottom half ===
==== Section 3 ====
First Round
(Scotland) R Blair (Scotland) I Bankier	21	17	4^{r}
(Netherlands) J Arends (Netherlands) S Piek	16	21	11
(China) Chai B (China) Bao YX	21	21
6	(United States) Lee HL (Canada) P Chan	10	16
(Chinese Taipei) Wan C-h (Chinese Taipei) Cheng C-y	21	21
(United States) M Lin (United States) R Wang	12	12
(New Zealand) K Dennerly-Minturn (New Zealand) K Gregory	12	3
4	(Japan) T Kamura (Japan) K Yonemoto	21	21

Second Round
(Netherlands) J Arends (Netherlands) S Piek	21	16	21
(China) Chai B (China) Bao YX	19	21	18
(Chinese Taipei) Wan C-h (Chinese Taipei) Cheng C-y	15	14
4	(Japan) T Kamura (Japan) K Yonemoto	21	21

Quarterfinals
(Netherlands) J Arends (Netherlands) S Piek	21	21
4	(Japan) T Kamura (Japan) K Yonemoto	14	12

==== Section 4 ====
First Round
(Australia) R Smith (Australia) R Veeran	18	14
(Thailand) M Jongjit (Thailand) S Taerattanachai	21	21
(Chinese Taipei) Liao K-h (Chinese Taipei) Chien Y-c
7	(Canada) N Yakura (Canada) G Gao	wo
(Philippines) K Asuncion (Thailand) S Ponsana	5	11
(China) Wang YL (China) Huang YQ	21	21
(Mexico) M Casillas (Mexico) N González	wo
2	(United States) P Chew (United States) J Subandhi

Second Round
(Thailand) M Jongjit (Thailand) S Taerattanachai	21	24
(Chinese Taipei) Liao K-h (Chinese Taipei) Chien Y-c	16	22
(China) Wang YL (China) Huang YQ	21	21
2	(United States) P Chew (United States) J Subandhi	11	15

Quarterfinals
(Thailand) M Jongjit (Thailand) S Taerattanachai	21	19	20
(China) Wang YL (China) Huang YQ	13	21	22

Preceded by 2013 Thailand Open Grand Prix Gold	BWF Grand Prix Gold and Grand Prix; 2013 season	Succeeded by 2013 Canada Open Grand Prix
