= Huang Yaqiong =

Chinese badminton player (born 1994)

Huang Yaqiong 黄雅琼
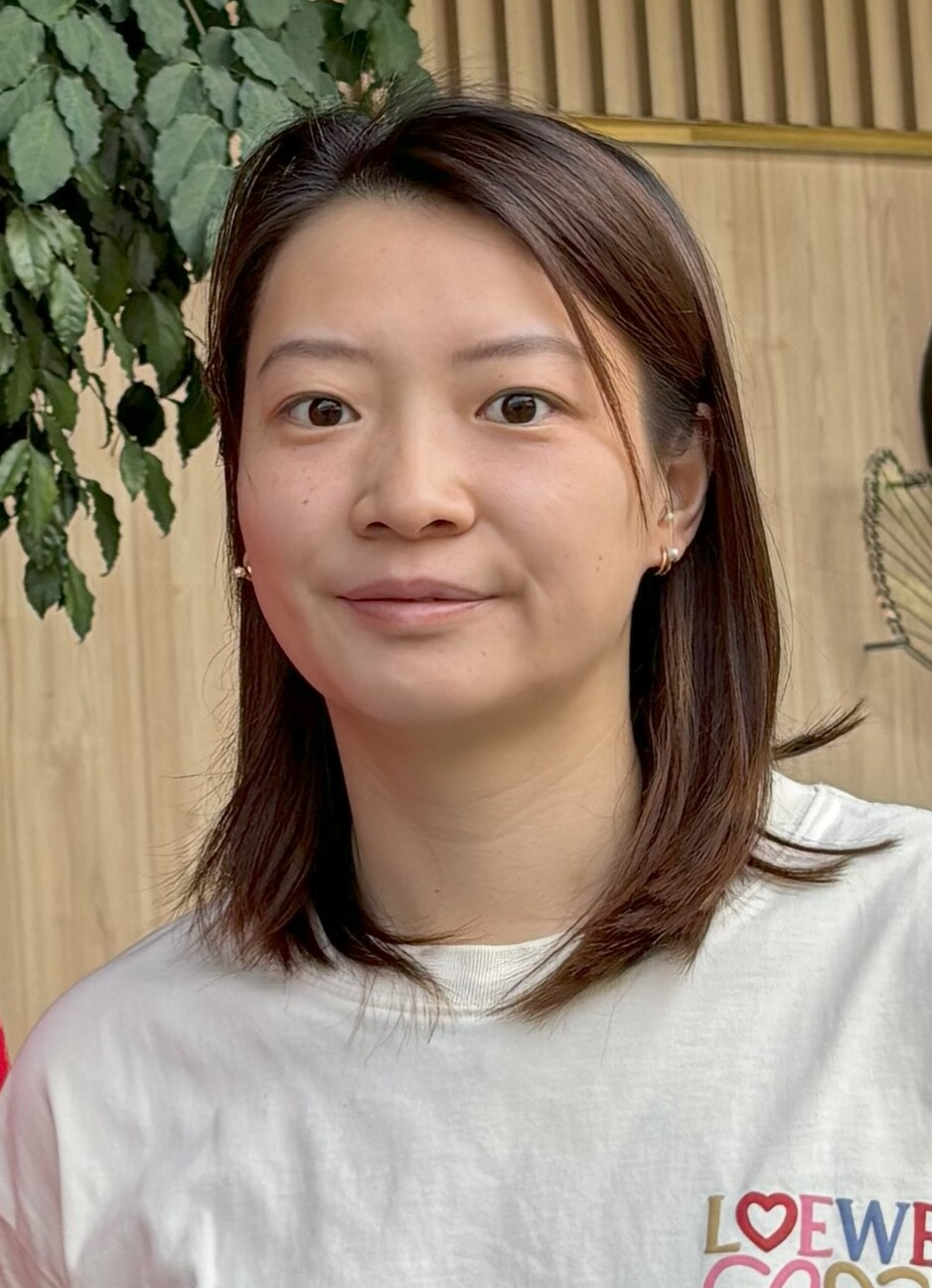
- Huang in 2024

Personal information
- Born: 28 February 1994 (age 32) Quzhou, Zhejiang, China
- Height: 1.65 m (5 ft 5 in)
- Spouse: Liu Yuchen (m. 2025)

Sport
- Country: China
- Sport: Badminton
- Handedness: Right
- Retired: 1 January 2025

Women's & mixed doubles
- Highest ranking: 9 (WD with Yu Xiaohan, 8 February 2018); 1 (XD with Zheng Siwei, 9 August 2018)
- BWF profile
Medal record
Women's badminton
Representing China
Olympic Games
Gold medal – first place	2024 Paris	Mixed doubles
Silver medal – second place	2020 Tokyo	Mixed doubles
World Championships
Gold medal – first place	2018 Nanjing	Mixed doubles
Gold medal – first place	2019 Basel	Mixed doubles
Gold medal – first place	2022 Tokyo	Mixed doubles
Silver medal – second place	2023 Copenhagen	Mixed doubles
Sudirman Cup
Gold medal – first place	2019 Nanning	Mixed team
Gold medal – first place	2023 Suzhou	Mixed team
Silver medal – second place	2017 Gold Coast	Mixed team
Uber Cup
Bronze medal – third place	2018 Bangkok	Women's team
Asian Games
Gold medal – first place	2018 Jakarta–Palembang	Mixed doubles
Gold medal – first place	2022 Hangzhou	Mixed doubles
Silver medal – second place	2018 Jakarta–Palembang	Women's team
Silver medal – second place	2022 Hangzhou	Women's team
Asian Championships
Gold medal – first place	2017 Wuhan	Mixed doubles
Gold medal – first place	2022 Manila	Mixed doubles
Silver medal – second place	2023 Dubai	Mixed doubles
Bronze medal – third place	2018 Wuhan	Mixed doubles
Bronze medal – third place	2019 Wuhan	Mixed doubles
Bronze medal – third place	2024 Ningbo	Mixed doubles
World Junior Championships
Gold medal – first place	2012 Chiba	Mixed team
Silver medal – second place	2012 Chiba	Girls' doubles
Bronze medal – third place	2012 Chiba	Mixed doubles
Asian Junior Championships
Gold medal – first place	2011 Lucknow	Mixed team
Silver medal – second place	2012 Gimcheon	Girls' doubles
Silver medal – second place	2012 Gimcheon	Mixed team

Huang Yaqiong (Chinese: 黄雅琼; pinyin: Huáng Yǎqióng, born 28 February 1994) is a Chinese badminton player who specializes in doubles. She is an Olympic gold medalist, three-time World Champion, two-time Asian Games gold medalist, and two-time Asian Champion. She also won a silver medal in the 2020 Summer Olympics. Huang reached a career-high of world number 1 in the mixed doubles event with Zheng Siwei.

Huang won the prestigious All England Open in 2017 partnered with Lu Kai, and in 2019 with Zheng Siwei. Together with Lu, she emerged as the champion at the 2017 Asian Championships. With her current partner Zheng, she won the gold medal at the 2018 and 2022 Asian Games, and claimed the BWF World Championships titles in 2018, 2019, and 2022. Huang was named the Female Player of the Year by the BWF in 2018 and 2019.

== Career ==
=== 2021 ===
Huang and her partner, Zheng Siwei, competed at the 2020 Summer Olympics as the top seeds. They won a silver medal after being defeated by their compatriots Wang Yilyu and Huang Dongping in the final in a close rubber game.

=== 2022 ===
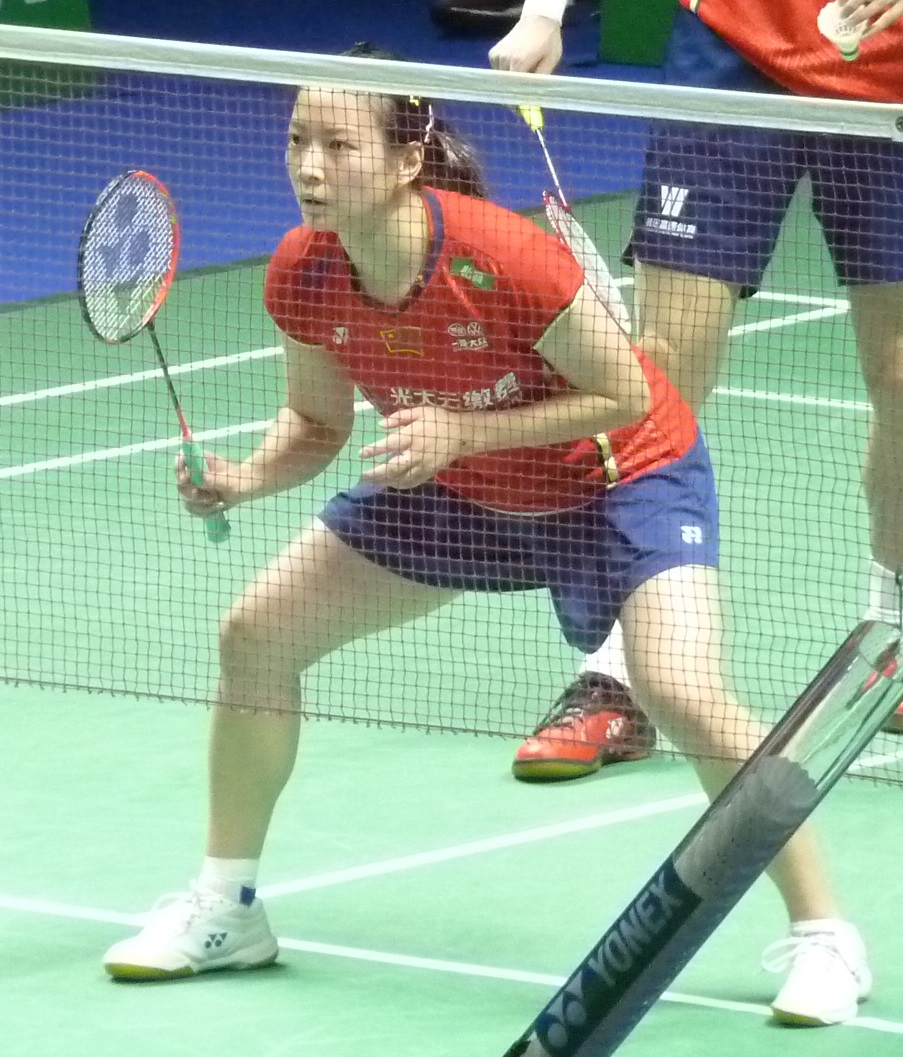
Huang at the 2022 German Open

Huang started a short-lived partnership with Ou Xuanyi, reaching 2 finals. However, she reunited with Zheng Siwei at the All England Open, which was held a week later. They reached the semifinals, where they were defeated by their compatriots Wang Yilyu and Huang Dongping once again, in three games.

In April, Huang and Zheng participated in the Asia Championships for the third time. They were crowned as the champions, avenging their defeat against Wang Yilyu and Huang Dongping in the final without dropping a game in the whole tournament.

From May to July, Huang and Zheng won 5 consecutive World Tour titles at the Thailand Open, Indonesia Masters, Indonesia Open, Malaysia Open and Malaysia Masters back to back. The pair topped the world rankings again after winning the Indonesia Open.

In August, competing as the top seed in the World Championships, Zheng and Huang got their third gold medal of this event in their career by beating Yuta Watanabe and Arisa Higashino, who were fighting in home soil, in two straight games.

Despite being revenged a week later in the semifinals of Japan Open, Zheng and Huang won two Super 750 events, Denmark Open and French Open in two three-game thrillers, against compatriots Feng and Huang and the Dutch pair Tabeling and Piek respectively. As a result, they finished 1st in the Race to World Tour Finals ranking.

They finished the year with their 10th title of the year in the World Tour Finals by beating No. 2 seeds Dechapol Puavaranukroh and Sapsiree Taerattanachai 21–19, 18–21, 21–13.

=== 2023 ===
Huang and Zheng competed as the top seeds and three-time defending champions in the Malaysia Open Super 1000 at the start of the year. They defended their title without dropping a set throughout the tournament. A week later they lost in the semifinals in the India Open to Yuta Watanabe and Arisa Higashino.

In March, the pair of Zheng/Huang participated in the All England Open and was crowned as champions for the 2nd time in their career as a pair by beating the Korean pair Seo Seung-jae and Chae Yu-jung.

In the end of April, Huang and Zheng participated in the Asia Championships as defending champions, and finished with a silver medal after losing to compatriots Jiang Zhenbang and Wei Yaxin.

In May, the pair then helped the Chinese team to lift the Sudirman Cup trophy by winning all 4 matches they played.

In June, after losing to Kim Won-ho and Jeong Na-eun in the quarterfinals in Singapore, Huang and Zheng won their third Super 1000 title of the season in the Indonesia Open, defeating Watanabe and Higashino in straight games in the final.

In August, the pair entered the World Championships as the top seeds and defending champions. Zheng reached his fifth final without dropping a single game, but the duo lost to Seo Seung-jae and Chae Yu-jung, a pair they never lost to in 9 meetings, in three close games.

In October, Huang and Zheng, who were 2018 champions, successfully defended their title they won 5 years ago at the 2022 Asian Games, avenging their defeat to Seo and Chae in the semi-finals and defeating Watanabe and Higashino in the final in straight games.

=== 2024 ===
In 2024, Huang and Zheng, who were dominant previously in Malaysia Open just finally defeated in 2024 by Kim Won-ho and Jeong Na-eun in three sets by scoreline of 21–11, 18–21, 17–21. Two weeks later, They manage to win their fifth Indonesia Masters against a young Japanese mixed doubles pair Hiroki Midorikawa and Natsu Saito in straight sets.

In March, Huang and Zheng pair manage to defend their All England Open title and won it for the third time against their Japanese rival and number 2 seeds, Yuta Watanabe and Arisa Higashino 21–16, 21–11. Later in April, Huang and Zheng continued to fumble the Asia Championships in the semifinals this time by losing to current recently heralded World Champions, Seo and Chae.

They saw a resurgence in form during the final two months before the Olympics winning the Singapore Open and reaching another final in the Indonesia Open. As a result of consistent seasons in last two years, Huang and Zheng managed to qualify to the 2024 Olympics as the first seed in mixed doubles category.

During the Olympics, Huang and Zheng did not have a single problem in the group stage and won all the three games. In the quarterfinals, they manage to defeat their compatriot who is in the second seed, Feng Yanzhe and Huang Dongping in an all Chinese quarterfinal before beating the fourth seed, Yuta Watanabe and Arisa Higashino 21–14, 21–15 in the semis and finally redeeming their lost at 2020 Olympics with a dominating straight sets win against Kim Won-ho and Jeong Na-eun 21–8, 21–11 and took their first gold medal, completing their final major collections.

To mark an illustrious ending to their international badminton career, Huang and Zheng won another World Tour Finals after defeating Chen Tang Jie and Toh Ee Wei in a grueling three sets match of 21–18, 14–21, 21–17.

=== 2025 ===
On New Year's Day, Huang announced her resignation from the national team, effectively retiring from international tournaments. She cited the accumulated injuries and increasing age as her reasons, despite still having the physical ability to compete. Her farewell party was held after the 2025 BWF World Tour Finals in Hangzhou.

== Personal life ==
On 2 August 2024, Huang's boyfriend, fellow Chinese 2020 Olympic badminton silver medalist Liu Yuchen, proposed to her right after she received her gold medal at the 2024 Summer Olympic badminton mixed doubles in Adidas Arena, Paris, which she accepted.

One year after the proposal, the couple shared on Weibo that they had registered their marriage.

== Achievements ==
=== Olympic Games ===
Mixed doubles
Year	Venue	Partner	Opponent	Score	Result
2020	Musashino Forest Sport Plaza, Tokyo, Japan	(China) Zheng Siwei	(China) Wang Yilyu (China) Huang Dongping	17–21, 21–17, 19–21	Silver
2024	Porte de La Chapelle Arena, Paris, France	(China) Zheng Siwei	(South Korea) Kim Won-ho (South Korea) Jeong Na-eun	21–8, 21–11	Gold

=== World Championships ===
Mixed doubles
Year	Venue	Partner	Opponent	Score	Result
2018	Nanjing Youth Olympic Sports Park, Nanjing, China	(China) Zheng Siwei	(China) Wang Yilyu (China) Huang Dongping	21–17, 21–19	Gold
2019	St. Jakobshalle, Basel, Switzerland	(China) Zheng Siwei	(Thailand) Dechapol Puavaranukroh (Thailand) Sapsiree Taerattanachai	21–8, 21–12	Gold
2022	Tokyo Metropolitan Gymnasium, Tokyo, Japan	(China) Zheng Siwei	(Japan) Yuta Watanabe (Japan) Arisa Higashino	21–13, 21–16	Gold
2023	Royal Arena, Copenhagen, Denmark	(China) Zheng Siwei	(South Korea) Seo Seung-jae (South Korea) Chae Yoo-jung	17–21, 21–10, 18–21	Silver

=== Asian Games ===
Mixed doubles
Year	Venue	Partner	Opponent	Score	Result
2018	Istora Gelora Bung Karno, Jakarta, Indonesia	(China) Zheng Siwei	(Hong Kong) Tang Chun Man (Hong Kong) Tse Ying Suet	21–8, 21–15	Gold
2022	Binjiang Gymnasium, Hangzhou, China	(China) Zheng Siwei	(Japan) Yuta Watanabe (Japan) Arisa Higashino	21–15, 21–14	Gold

=== Asian Championships ===
Mixed doubles
Year	Venue	Partner	Opponent	Score	Result
2017	Wuhan Sports Center Gymnasium, Wuhan, China	(China) Lu Kai	(Thailand) Dechapol Puavaranukroh (Thailand) Sapsiree Taerattanachai	21–18, 21–11	Gold
2018	Wuhan Sports Center Gymnasium, Wuhan, China	(China) Zheng Siwei	(Indonesia) Tontowi Ahmad (Indonesia) Liliyana Natsir	11–21, 13–21	Bronze
2019	Wuhan Sports Center Gymnasium, Wuhan, China	(China) Zheng Siwei	(China) He Jiting (China) Du Yue	14–21, 18–21	Bronze
2022	Muntinlupa Sports Complex, Metro Manila, Philippines	(China) Zheng Siwei	(China) Wang Yilyu (China) Huang Dongping	21–17, 21–8	Gold
2023	Sheikh Rashid Bin Hamdan Indoor Hall, Dubai, United Arab Emirates	(China) Zheng Siwei	(China) Jiang Zhenbang (China) Wei Yaxin	15–21, 14–21	Silver
2024	Ningbo Olympic Sports Center Gymnasium, Ningbo, China	(China) Zheng Siwei	(South Korea) Seo Seung-jae (South Korea) Chae Yoo-jung	21–9, 13–21, 16–21	Bronze

=== World Junior Championships ===
Girls' doubles
Year	Venue	Partner	Opponent	Score	Result
2012	Chiba Port Arena, Chiba, Japan	(China) Yu Xiaohan	(South Korea) Lee So-hee (South Korea) Shin Seung-chan	14–21, 21–18, 18–21	Silver

Mixed doubles
Year	Venue	Partner	Opponent	Score	Result
2012	Chiba Port Arena, Chiba, Japan	(China) Wang Yilyu	(Indonesia) Alfian Eko Prasetya (Indonesia) Shella Devi Aulia	21–12, 19–21, 12–21	Bronze

=== Asian Junior Championships ===
Girls' doubles
Year	Venue	Partner	Opponent	Score	Result
2012	Gimcheon Indoor Stadium, Gimcheon, South Korea	(China) Yu Xiaohan	(South Korea) Lee So-hee (South Korea) Shin Seung-chan	21–17, 15–21, 17–21	Silver

=== BWF World Tour (33 titles, 10 runners-up) ===
The BWF World Tour, which was announced on 19 March 2017, and implemented in 2018, is a series of elite badminton tournaments sanctioned by the Badminton World Federation (BWF). The BWF World Tour is divided into levels of World Tour Finals, Super 1000, Super 750, Super 500, Super 300, and the BWF Tour Super 100.

Mixed doubles
Year	Tournament	Level	Partner	Opponent	Score	Result
2018	Malaysia Masters	Super 500	(China) Zheng Siwei	(Hong Kong) Tang Chun Man (Hong Kong) Tse Ying Suet	21–19, 20–22, 18–21	(silver) Runner-up
2018	Indonesia Masters	Super 500	(China) Zheng Siwei	(Indonesia) Tontowi Ahmad (Indonesia) Liliyana Natsir	21–14, 21–11	(gold) Winner
2018	All England Open	Super 1000	(China) Zheng Siwei	(Japan) Yuta Watanabe (Japan) Arisa Higashino	21–15, 20–22, 16–21	(silver) Runner-up
2018	Malaysia Open	Super 750	(China) Zheng Siwei	(China) Wang Yilyu (China) Huang Dongping	21–19, 21–18	(gold) Winner
2018	Japan Open	Super 750	(China) Zheng Siwei	(China) Wang Yilyu (China) Huang Dongping	21–19, 21–8	(gold) Winner
2018	China Open	Super 1000	(China) Zheng Siwei	(China) Zhang Nan (China) Li Yinhui	21–16, 21–9	(gold) Winner
2018	Denmark Open	Super 750	(China) Zheng Siwei	(Thailand) Dechapol Puavaranukroh (Thailand) Sapsiree Taerattanachai	21–16, 21–13	(gold) Winner
2018	French Open	Super 750	(China) Zheng Siwei	(South Korea) Seo Seung-jae (South Korea) Chae Yoo-jung	21–19, 21–14	(gold) Winner
2018	Fuzhou China Open	Super 750	(China) Zheng Siwei	(China) Wang Yilyu (China) Huang Dongping	21–15, 11–21, 21–19	(gold) Winner
2018	BWF World Tour Finals	World Tour Finals	(China) Zheng Siwei	(China) Wang Yilyu (China) Huang Dongping	21–23, 21–16, 18–21	(silver) Runner-up
2019	Indonesia Masters	Super 500	(China) Zheng Siwei	(Indonesia) Tontowi Ahmad (Indonesia) Liliyana Natsir	19–21, 21–19, 21–16	(gold) Winner
2019	All England Open	Super 1000	(China) Zheng Siwei	(Japan) Yuta Watanabe (Japan) Arisa Higashino	21–17, 22–20	(gold) Winner
2019	Malaysia Open	Super 750	(China) Zheng Siwei	(China) Wang Yilyu (China) Huang Dongping	21–17, 21–13	(gold) Winner
2019	Indonesia Open	Super 1000	(China) Zheng Siwei	(China) Wang Yilyu (China) Huang Dongping	21–13, 21–18	(gold) Winner
2019	China Open	Super 1000	(China) Zheng Siwei	(China) Wang Yilyu (China) Huang Dongping	21–17, 15–21, 21–16	(gold) Winner
2019	Korea Open	Super 500	(China) Zheng Siwei	(Thailand) Dechapol Puavaranukroh (Thailand) Sapsiree Taerattanachai	14–21, 13–21	(silver) Runner-up
2019	French Open	Super 750	(China) Zheng Siwei	(Indonesia) Praveen Jordan (Indonesia) Melati Daeva Oktavianti	24–22, 16–21, 12–21	(silver) Runner-up
2019	Fuzhou China Open	Super 750	(China) Zheng Siwei	(China) Wang Yilyu (China) Huang Dongping	14–21, 13–21	(silver) Runner-up
2019	BWF World Tour Finals	World Tour Finals	(China) Zheng Siwei	(China) Wang Yilyu (China) Huang Dongping	21–14, 21–14	(gold) Winner
2020	Malaysia Masters	Super 500	(China) Zheng Siwei	(China) Wang Yilyu (China) Huang Dongping	21–19, 21–12	(gold) Winner
2020	Indonesia Masters	Super 500	(China) Zheng Siwei	(China) Wang Yilyu (China) Huang Dongping	21–9, 21–9	(gold) Winner
2022	German Open	Super 300	(China) Ou Xuanyi	(Thailand) Dechapol Puavaranukroh (Thailand) Sapsiree Taerattanachai	11–21, 9–21	(silver) Runner-up
2022	Korea Masters	Super 300	(China) Ou Xuanyi	(China) Wang Yilyu (China) Huang Dongping	17–21, 17–21	(silver) Runner-up
2022	Thailand Open	Super 500	(China) Zheng Siwei	(Thailand) Dechapol Puavaranukroh (Thailand) Sapsiree Taerattanachai	21–12, 18–21, 21–14	(gold) Winner
2022	Indonesia Masters	Super 500	(China) Zheng Siwei	(France) Thom Gicquel (France) Delphine Delrue	21–13, 21–14	(gold) Winner
2022	Indonesia Open	Super 1000	(China) Zheng Siwei	(Japan) Yuta Watanabe (Japan) Arisa Higashino	21–14, 21–16	(gold) Winner
2022	Malaysia Open	Super 750	(China) Zheng Siwei	(Thailand) Dechapol Puavaranukroh (Thailand) Sapsiree Taerattanachai	21–13, 21–18	(gold) Winner
2022	Malaysia Masters	Super 500	(China) Zheng Siwei	(Indonesia) Rinov Rivaldy (Indonesia) Pitha Haningtyas Mentari	21–17, 21–12	(gold) Winner
2022	Denmark Open	Super 750	(China) Zheng Siwei	(China) Feng Yanzhe (China) Huang Dongping	21–19, 20–22, 21–19	(gold) Winner
2022	French Open	Super 750	(China) Zheng Siwei	(Netherlands) Robin Tabeling (Netherlands) Selena Piek	21–16, 14–21, 22–20	(gold) Winner
2022	BWF World Tour Finals	World Tour Finals	(China) Zheng Siwei	(Thailand) Dechapol Puavaranukroh (Thailand) Sapsiree Taerattanachai	21–19, 18–21, 21–13	(gold) Winner
2023	Malaysia Open	Super 1000	(China) Zheng Siwei	(Japan) Yuta Watanabe (Japan) Arisa Higashino	21–19, 21–11	(gold) Winner
2023	All England Open	Super 1000	(China) Zheng Siwei	(South Korea) Seo Seung-jae (South Korea) Chae Yoo-jung	21–16, 16–21, 21–12	(gold) Winner
2023	Indonesia Open	Super 1000	(China) Zheng Siwei	(Japan) Yuta Watanabe (Japan) Arisa Higashino	21–14, 21–11	(gold) Winner
2023	Denmark Open	Super 750	(China) Zheng Siwei	(China) Feng Yanzhe (China) Huang Dongping	21–16, 15–21, 24–26	(silver) Runner-up
2023	Japan Masters	Super 500	(China) Zheng Siwei	(China) Feng Yanzhe (China) Huang Dongping	25–23, 21–9	(gold) Winner
2023	China Masters	Super 750	(China) Zheng Siwei	(South Korea) Seo Seung-jae (South Korea) Chae Yoo-jung	21–10, 21–11	(gold) Winner
2023	BWF World Tour Finals	World Tour Finals	(China) Zheng Siwei	(China) Feng Yanzhe (China) Huang Dongping	21–11, 21–18	(gold) Winner
2024	Indonesia Masters	Super 500	(China) Zheng Siwei	(Japan) Hiroki Midorikawa (Japan) Natsu Saito	21–15, 21–16	(gold) Winner
2024	All England Open	Super 1000	(China) Zheng Siwei	(Japan) Yuta Watanabe (Japan) Arisa Higashino	21–16, 21–11	(gold) Winner
2024	Singapore Open	Super 750	(China) Zheng Siwei	(Chinese Taipei) Yang Po-hsuan (Chinese Taipei) Hu Ling-fang	21–11, 21–19	(gold) Winner
2024	Indonesia Open	Super 1000	(China) Zheng Siwei	(China) Jiang Zhenbang (China) Wei Yaxin	11–21, 14–21	(silver) Runner-up
2024	BWF World Tour Finals	World Tour Finals	(China) Zheng Siwei	(Malaysia) Chen Tang Jie (Malaysia) Toh Ee Wei	21–18, 14–21, 21–17	(gold) Winner

=== BWF Superseries (9 titles, 3 runners-up) ===
The BWF Superseries, which was launched on 14 December 2006, and implemented in 2007, was a series of elite badminton tournaments, sanctioned by the Badminton World Federation (BWF). BWF Superseries levels were Superseries and Superseries Premier. A season of Superseries consisted of twelve tournaments around the world that had been introduced since 2011. Successful players were invited to the Superseries Finals, which were held at the end of each year.

Women's doubles
Year	Tournament	Partner	Opponent	Score	Result
2015	French Open	(China) Tang Jinhua	(China) Luo Ying (China) Luo Yu	21–13, 21–16	(gold) Winner
2017	Malaysia Open	(China) Tang Jinhua	(Japan) Yuki Fukushima (Japan) Sayaka Hirota	17–21, 21–18, 12–21	(silver) Runner-up
2017	Korea Open	(China) Yu Xiaohan	(South Korea) Chang Ye-na (South Korea) Lee So-hee	21–11, 21–15	(gold) Winner

Mixed doubles
Year	Tournament	Partner	Opponent	Score	Result
2015	Singapore Open	(China) Lu Kai	(China) Zhang Nan (China) Zhao Yunlei	Walkover	(silver) Runner-up
2016	India Open	(China) Lu Kai	(Indonesia) Riky Widianto (Indonesia) Richi Puspita Dili	21–13, 21–16	(gold) Winner
2016	Australian Open	(China) Lu Kai	(China) Zheng Siwei (China) Chen Qingchen	21–18, 21–14	(gold) Winner
2017	All England Open	(China) Lu Kai	(Malaysia) Chan Peng Soon (Malaysia) Goh Liu Ying	18–21, 21–19, 21–16	(gold) Winner
2017	India Open	(China) Lu Kai	(China) Zheng Siwei (China) Chen Qingchen	24–22, 14–21, 21–17	(gold) Winner
2017	Malaysia Open	(China) Lu Kai	(China) Zheng Siwei (China) Chen Qingchen	15–21, 18–21	(silver) Runner-up
2017	Singapore Open	(China) Lu Kai	(Thailand) Dechapol Puavaranukroh (Thailand) Sapsiree Taerattanachai	19–21, 21–16, 21–11	(gold) Winner
2017	China Open	(China) Zheng Siwei	(Denmark) Mathias Christiansen (Denmark) Christinna Pedersen	21–15, 21–11	(gold) Winner
2017	Hong Kong Open	(China) Zheng Siwei	(Denmark) Mathias Christiansen (Denmark) Christinna Pedersen	21–15, 21–13	(gold) Winner

BWF Super Series Finals tournament
BWF Super Series Premier tournament
BWF Super Series tournament

=== BWF Grand Prix (10 titles, 8 runners-up) ===
The BWF Grand Prix had two levels, the Grand Prix and Grand Prix Gold. It was a series of badminton tournaments sanctioned by the Badminton World Federation (BWF) and played between 2007 and 2017.

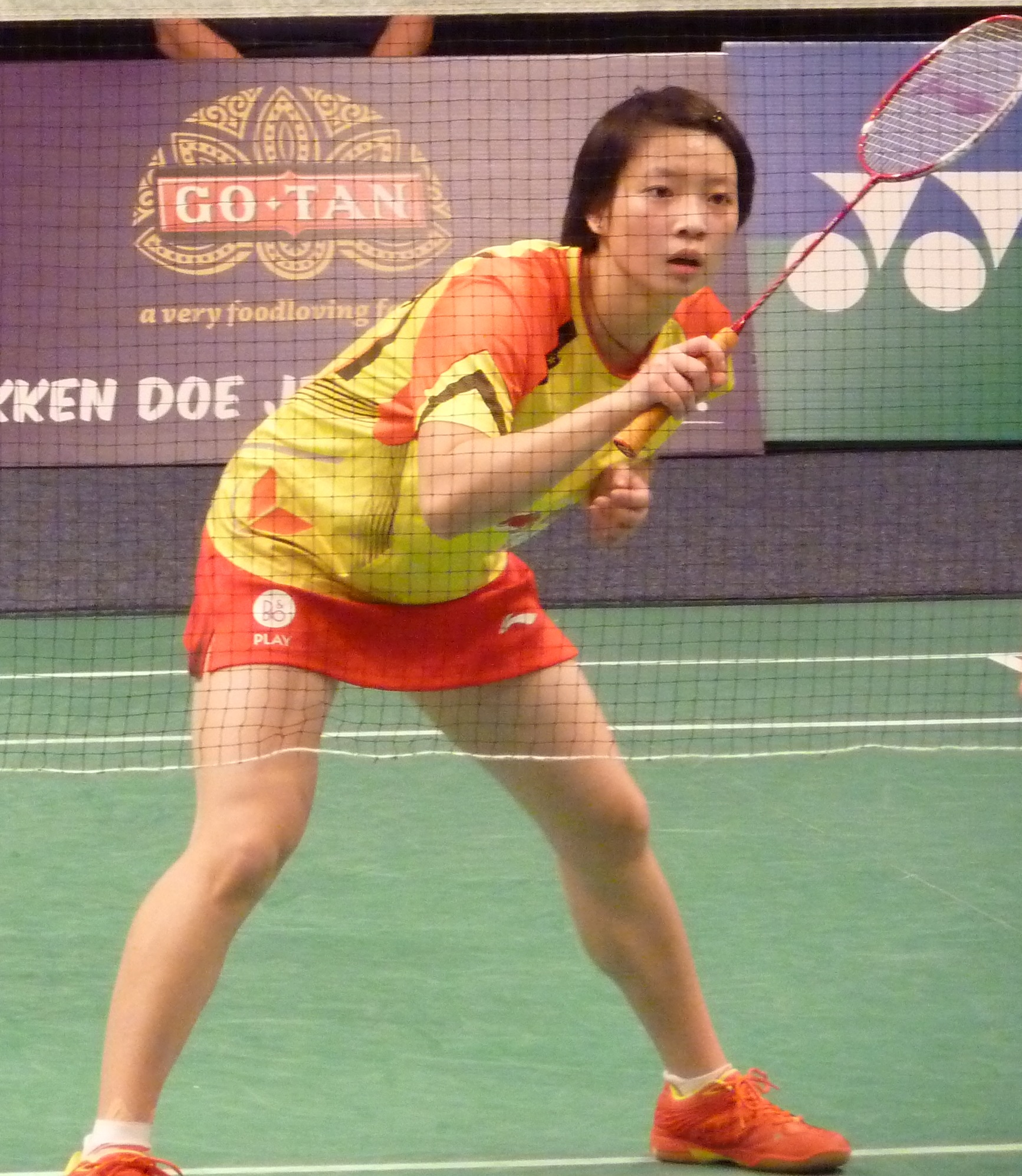
Huang at 2013 Dutch Open Grand Prix

Women's doubles
Year	Tournament	Partner	Opponent	Score	Result
2013	U.S. Open	(China) Yu Xiaohan	(China) Bao Yixin (China) Zhong Qianxin	17–21, 22–24	(silver) Runner-up
2013	Canada Open	(China) Yu Xiaohan	(Netherlands) Eefje Muskens (Netherlands) Selena Piek	13–21, 21–11, 21–13	(gold) Winner
2013	Macau Open	(China) Yu Xiaohan	(China) Bao Yixin (China) Tang Jinhua	17–21, 15–21	(silver) Runner-up
2014	India Grand Prix Gold	(China) Yu Xiaohan	(China) Chen Qingchen (China) Jia Yifan	24–22, 19–21, 11–21	(silver) Runner-up
2014	Malaysia Grand Prix Gold	(China) Yu Xiaohan	(China) Ou Dongni (China) Xiong Mengjing	22–20, 12–21, 21–18	(gold) Winner
2014	China Masters	(China) Yu Xiaohan	(China) Luo Ying (China) Luo Yu	17–21, 19–21	(silver) Runner-up
2014	Macau Open	(China) Zhong Qianxin	(China) Ou Dongni (China) Yu Xiaohan	21–19, 19–21, 7–21	(silver) Runner-up
2016	German Open	(China) Tang Jinhua	(Thailand) Puttita Supajirakul (Thailand) Sapsiree Taerattanachai	21–14, 21–18	(gold) Winner
2017	China Masters	(China) Tang Jinhua	(China) Bao Yixin (China) Yu Xiaohan	21–8, 14–21, 17–21	(silver) Runner-up
2017	Macau Open	(China) Yu Xiaohan	(South Korea) Baek Ha-na (South Korea) Lee Yu-rim	21–10, 21–17	(gold) Winner

Mixed doubles
Year	Tournament	Partner	Opponent	Score	Result
2013	U.S. Open	(China) Wang Yilyu	(Hong Kong) Lee Chun Hei (Hong Kong) Chau Hoi Wah	8–21, 14–21	(silver) Runner-up
2013	Macau Open	(China) Lu Kai	(South Korea) Choi Sol-gyu (South Korea) Chae Yoo-jung	17–21, 21–18, 21–17	(gold) Winner
2014	India Grand Prix Gold	(China) Wang Yilyu	(China) Huang Kaixiang (China) Chen Qingchen	21–18, 21–14	(gold) Winner
2014	Malaysia Grand Prix Gold	(China) Lu Kai	(Indonesia) Praveen Jordan (Indonesia) Debby Susanto	21–14, 21–13	(gold) Winner
2014	China Masters	(China) Lu Kai	(China) Wang Yilyu (China) Xia Huan	21–12, 21–14	(gold) Winner
2015	Swiss Open	(China) Lu Kai	(China) Liu Cheng (China) Bao Yixin	17–21, 22–20, 21–13	(gold) Winner
2017	German Open	(China) Lu Kai	(China) Zhang Nan (China) Li Yinhui	20–22, 11–21	(silver) Runner-up
2017	Macau Open	(China) Zheng Siwei	(South Korea) Seo Seung-jae (South Korea) Kim Ha-na	21–14, 21–11	(gold) Winner

BWF Grand Prix Gold tournament
BWF Grand Prix tournament

== Performance timeline ==
Key

W	Won	F	Finalist	SF	Semi-finalist
QF	Quarter-finalist	#R	Rounds 4, 3, 2, 1	RR	Round-robin stage
Q#	Qualification round	A	Absent	w/d	Withdrew
G	Gold	S	Silver	B	Bronze
NH	Not held	N/A	Not applicable	DNQ	Did not qualify

=== National team ===
- Junior level

Team events	2011	2012
Asian Junior Championships	G	S
World Junior Championships	A	G

- Senior level

Team events	2017	2018	2019	2020	2021	2022	2023
Asian Games	NH	S	NH			S	NH
Uber Cup	NH	B	NH	A	NH	A	NH
Sudirman Cup	S	NH	G	NH	A	NH	G

=== Individual competitions ===
==== Junior level ====
- Girls' doubles

Events	2011	2012
Asian Junior Championships	QF	S
World Junior Championships	A	S

- Mixed doubles

Events	2011	2012
Asian Junior Championships	2R	3R
World Junior Championships	A	B

==== Senior level ====
===== Women's doubles =====
Events	2017	2018
Asian Championships	2R	2R
World Championships	A	3R

Tournament	BWF Superseries / Grand Prix						BWF World Tour	Best
Tournament	2012	2013	2014	2015	2016	2017	2018	Best
Swiss Open	A				SF	A		SF ('16)
German Open	A				W	2R	A	W ('16)
All England Open	A				1R	2R	A	2R ('17)
Malaysia Masters	A	2R	W	A				W ('14)
Australian Open	A		1R	A	QF	2R	A	QF ('16)
India Open	A				2R	QF	A	QF ('17)
Malaysia Open	A				2R	F	A	F ('17)
Singapore Open	A			QF	2R	A		QF ('15)
Korea Masters	A	QF	A					QF ('13)
Canada Open	A	W	A					W ('13)
U.S. Open	A	F	A					F ('13)
Korea Open	A				w/d	W	A	W ('17)
Chinese Taipei Open	A		SF	SF	A			SF ('14, '15)
China Open	A		2R	w/d	w/d	2R	A	2R ('14, '17)
Japan Open	A				w/d	A		NA
Syed Modi International	A	NH	F	A				F ('14)
Dutch Open	A	1R	A					1R ('13)
Denmark Open	A			1R	A	QF	A	QF ('17)
French Open	A			W	A	2R	1R	W ('15)
Hylo Open	A		SF	A				SF ('14)
Macau Open	A	F	F	A	w/d	W	A	W ('17)
China Masters	A	w/d	F	A		F	1R	F ('14, '17)
Hong Kong Open	A					QF	A	QF ('17)
Indonesia Masters	QF	A				NH	A	QF ('12)
Indonesia Open	A				QF	2R	A	QF ('16)
London Grand Prix Gold	NH	1R	NH					1R ('13)
BWF Superseries / World Tour Finals	DNQ					SF	DNQ	SF ('17)
Year-end ranking	179	70	53	98	21	9	198	9
Tournament	2012	2013	2014	2015	2016	2017	2018	Best

===== Mixed doubles =====
Events	2014	2015	2016	2017	2018	2019	2020	2021	2022	2023	2024
Asian Championships	A	QF	QF	G	B	B	NH		G	S	B
Asian Games	A	NH			G	NH			G	NH	
World Championships	QF	3R	NH	QF	G	G	NH	2R	G	S	NH
Olympic Games	NH		DNQ	NH			S	NH			G

Tournament	BWF Superseries / Grand Prix					BWF World Tour							Best
Tournament	2013	2014	2015	2016	2017	2018	2019	2020	2021	2022	2023	2024	Best
Malaysia Open	A		2R	1R	F	W	W	NH		W	W	QF	W ('18, '19, '22, '23)
India Open	A	2R	QF	W	W	A		NH		A	SF	w/d	W ('16, '17)
Indonesia Masters	A		QF	A	NH	W	W	W	A	W	A	W	W ('18, '19, '20, '22, '24)
German Open	A			1R	F	A		NH		F	A		F ('17, '22)
French Open	A	QF	SF	1R	QF	W	F	NH	A	W	QF	QF	W ('18, '22)
All England Open	A	2R	QF	2R	W	F	W	2R	A	SF	W	W	W ('17, '19, '23, '24)
Swiss Open	A	2R	W	A				NH	A				W ('15)
Malaysia Masters	1R	W	A			F	A	W	NH	W	A		W ('14, '20, '22)
Thailand Open	A	NH	A						NH	W	A		W ('22)
Singapore Open	A	1R	F	1R	W	A	SF	NH		w/d	QF	W	W ('17, '24)
Indonesia Open	A	QF	QF	SF	2R	SF	W	NH	A	W	W	F	W ('19, '22, '23)
Australian Open	A	2R	2R	W	w/d	A		NH		A			W ('16)
U.S. Open	F	A						NH			A		F ('13)
Canada Open	2R	A						NH		A			2R ('13)
Japan Open	A		2R	SF	QF	W	QF	NH		SF	SF	A	W ('18)
Korea Open	A		QF	QF	A	1R	F	NH		QF	QF	A	F ('19)
Chinese Taipei Open	A	2R	2R	A				NH		A			2R ('14, '15)
Hong Kong Open	A	SF	1R	2R	W	A		NH			A		W ('17)
China Open	A	SF	2R	2R	W	W	W	NH			QF	w/d	W ('17, '18, '19)
Macau Open	W	1R	A		W	A		NH				A	W ('13, '17)
Denmark Open	A	2R	QF	SF	2R	W	QF	A		W	F	A	W ('18, '22)
Korea Masters	QF	A						NH		F	A		F ('22)
Japan Masters	NH										W	A	W ('23)
China Masters	1R	W	A	QF	A	W	F	NH			W	A	W ('14, '18, '23)
Syed Modi International	NH	W	A					NH		A			W ('14)
BWF Superseries / World Tour Finals	DNQ			RR	w/d	F	W	DNQ		W	W	W	W ('19, '22, '23, '24)
Dutch Open	QF	A						NH	N/A				QF ('13)
London Grand Prix Gold	1R	NH											1R ('13)
Year-end ranking	79	8	9	7	2	1	1	1	2	1	1		1
Tournament	2013	2014	2015	2016	2017	2018	2019	2020	2021	2022	2023	2024	Best
