= Shizuka Uchida =

Japanese badminton player (born 1989)

Personal information
- Born: 打田 しづか; 26 July 1989 (age 37) Ōbu, Aichi, Japan
- Height: 1.63 m (5 ft 4 in)

Sport
- Country: Japan
- Sport: Badminton
- Handedness: Right

Women's singles & doubles
- Highest ranking: 40 (WS) 14 April 2011; 54 (WD) 2 December 2010
- BWF profile
Medal record
Women's badminton
Representing Japan
Asian Junior Championships
Bronze medal – third place	2007 Kuala Lumpur	Mixed team

Shizuka Uchida (打田 しづか, Uchida Shizuka; born 26 July 1989) is a former Japanese badminton player who plays in singles and doubles event. She was born in Ōbu, Aichi, and graduated from the Okazaki Josei High School. Uchida competed at the 2007 and 2008 Asian Junior Badminton Championships, winning a mixed team bronze medal in 2007. She was join the Unisys badminton team in April 2008. Her best achievement is to reach the final round of the Superseries event at the 2013 Japan Open. She retired in February 2016, after the Japan league final match.

== Achievements ==
=== BWF Superseries ===
The BWF Superseries, launched on 14 December 2006 and implemented in 2007, is a series of elite badminton tournaments, sanctioned by Badminton World Federation (BWF). BWF Superseries has two level such as Superseries and Superseries Premier. A season of Superseries features twelve tournaments around the world, which introduced since 2011, with successful players invited to the Superseries Finals held at the year end.

Women's singles
Year	Tournament	Opponent	Score	Result
2013	Japan Open	(Japan) Akane Yamaguchi	15–21, 19–21	(silver) Runner up

BWF Super Series tournament

=== BWF Grand Prix ===
The BWF Grand Prix has two levels: Grand Prix Gold and Grand Prix. It is a series of badminton tournaments, sanctioned by Badminton World Federation (BWF) since 2007.

Women's singles
Year	Tournament	Opponent	Score	Result	Ref.
2012	Russian Open	(Japan) Yui Hashimoto	19–21, 12–21	(silver) Runner-up	
2014	Russian Open	(Japan) Aya Ohori	19–21, 4–21	(silver) Runner-up	

BWF Grand Prix tournament

=== BWF International Challenge/Series ===
Women's singles
Year	Tournament	Opponent	Score	Result
2013	Polish Open	(Chinese Taipei) Pai Hsiao-ma	Walkover	(gold) Winner

BWF International Challenge tournament
