= Malvinne Alcala =

Filipino badminton player (born 1995)

Personal information
- Born: Malvinne Ann Venice Alcala; 11 May 1995 (age 31)

Sport
- Sport: Badminton

Women's singles
- Highest ranking: 97 (19 May 2011)
- BWF profile

Malvinne Ann Venice Alcala (born November 5, 1995) is a Filipino badminton player.

== Career ==
Alcala won three silver medals at the 2008 Palarong Pambansa in the Philippines. In 2011, she competed in the South East Asia Games and was the fifth in the ranking with the team.
