= Yuka Kusunose =

Japanese badminton player

Personal information
- Born: 9 June 1987 (age 39) Kōchi Prefecture, Japan
- Height: 1.61 m (5 ft 3 in)

Sport
- Country: Japan
- Sport: Badminton
- Handedness: Left

Women's singles
- Highest ranking: 58 (17 April 2014)
- BWF profile

Yuka Kusunose (楠瀬 由佳, Kusunose Yuka; born 9 June 1987) is a Japanese female badminton player and also play for the Hokuto Bank team. In 2011, she won the Smiling Fish International tournament in Thailand, and in 2014, she won the Polish Open. She also reach the final at the U.S. Open.

== Achievements ==
=== BWF Grand Prix ===
The BWF Grand Prix has two level such as Grand Prix and Grand Prix Gold. It is a series of badminton tournaments, sanctioned by Badminton World Federation (BWF) since 2007.

Women's Singles

| Year | Tournament | Opponent | Score | Result | Ref |
|---|---|---|---|---|---|
| 2013 | U.S. Open | (Thailand) Sapsiree Taerattanachai | 12–21, 13–21 | (silver) Runner-up | |

BWF Grand Prix Gold tournament

=== BWF International Challenge/Series ===
Women's Singles

| Year | Tournament | Opponent | Score | Result | Ref |
|---|---|---|---|---|---|
| 2011 | Polish Open | (Ukraine) Larisa Griga | 15–21, 16–21 | (silver) Runner-up | |
| 2011 | Smiling Fish International | (Japan) Emi Moue | 21–14, 21–9 | (gold) Winner | |
| 2014 | Polish Open | (Japan) Chisato Hoshi | 21–13, 21–18 | (gold) Winner | |

BWF International Challenge tournament
BWF International Series tournament
