= Pakkawat Vilailak =

Thai badminton player (born 1988)

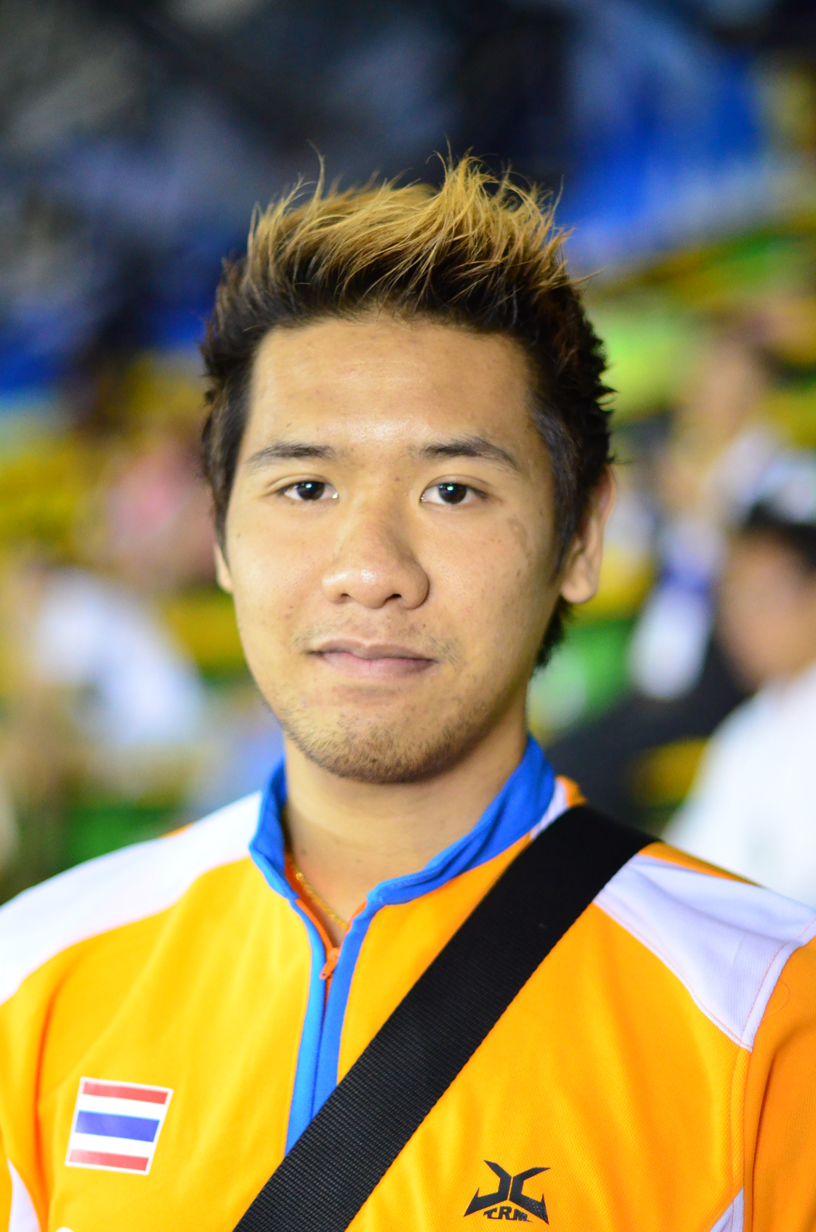

Personal information
- Born: 30 October 1988 (age 38)
- Height: 1.73 m (5 ft 8 in)
- Weight: 68 kg (150 lb)

Sport
- Country: Thailand
- Sport: Badminton
- Handedness: Right

Men's & mixed doubles
- Highest ranking: 67 (MS April 2010); 54 (MD August 2013); 178 (XD April 2014)
- BWF profile
Medal record
Men's badminton
Representing Thailand
Asian Games
Bronze medal – third place	2010 Guangzhou	Men's team
Southeast Asian Games
Silver medal – second place	2015 Singapore	Men's team
Bronze medal – third place	2007 Nakhon Ratchasima	Men's team
Bronze medal – third place	2009 Vientiane	Men's team
Bronze medal – third place	2011 Jakarta	Men's team

Pakkawat Vilailak (Thai: ภควัฒน์ วิไลลักษณ์; born 30 October 1988) is a Thai badminton player. He was specializing in singles but in early 2013, made a notable switch to doubles to partner Bodin Isara after the latter ended his partnership with Maneepong Jongjit. He was the men's singles champion at the 2010 Kaohsiung International Challenge tournament.

== Achievements ==
=== BWF Grand Prix ===
The BWF Grand Prix had two levels, the Grand Prix and Grand Prix Gold. It was a series of badminton tournaments sanctioned by the Badminton World Federation (BWF) and played between 2007 and 2017.

Men's doubles
Year	Tournament	Partner	Opponent	Score	Result
2013	Canada Open	(Thailand) Bodin Isara	(Thailand) Maneepong Jongjit (Thailand) Nipitphon Phuangphuapet	12–21, disqualified	(silver) Runner-up

BWF Grand Prix Gold tournament
BWF Grand Prix tournament

=== BWF International Challenge/Series ===
Men's singles
Year	Tournament	Opponent	Score	Result
2007	Smiling Fish International	(Thailand) Poompat Sapkulchananart	13–21, 13–21	(silver) Runner-up
2008	Smiling Fish International	(Thailand) Tanongsak Saensomboonsuk	18–21, 23–21, 15–21	(silver) Runner-up
2008	Singapore International	(South Korea) Ahn Hyun-suk	19–21, 15–21	(silver) Runner-up
2010	Kaohsiung International	(Chinese Taipei) Hsu Jen-hao	21–10, 21–15	(gold) Winner

BWF International Challenge tournament
BWF International Series tournament
