= Yui Hashimoto =

Japanese badminton player

Personal information
- Born: 14 May 1990 (age 36) Iwate Prefecture, Japan

Sport
- Country: Japan
- Sport: Badminton
- Handedness: Right
- Retired: 26 December 2019

Women's singles
- Highest ranking: 14 (31 March 2016)
- BWF profile
Medal record
Badminton
Representing Japan
Asian Games
Bronze medal – third place	2014 Incheon	Women's team
Asia Team Championships
Silver medal – second place	2016 Hyderabad	Women's team
East Asian Games
Bronze medal – third place	2013 Tianjin	Women's team

Yui Hashimoto (橋本 由衣, Hashimoto Yui; born 14 May 1990) is a Japanese badminton player who plays for NTT East badminton club.

She retired from the National team on 26 December 2019 at the Japanese National Badminton Championships.

== Achievements ==
=== BWF Superseries ===
The BWF Superseries, launched on December 14, 2006, and implemented in 2007, is a series of elite badminton tournaments sanctioned by the Badminton World Federation (BWF). It has two levels, the Superseries and Superseries Premier. A season of Superseries features twelve tournaments around the world, introduced in 2011, with successful players invited to the Superseries Finals held at the year's end.

Women's singles
Year	Tournament	Opponent	Score	Result	Ref.
2015	Indonesia Open	(Thailand) Ratchanok Intanon	11–21, 10–21	(silver) Runner-up	

BWF Super Series Premier tournament

=== BWF Grand Prix ===
The BWF Grand Prix has two levels, the Grand Prix and Grand Prix Gold. It is a series of badminton tournaments sanctioned by the BWF since 2007.

Women's singles
Year	Tournament	Opponent	Score	Result	Ref.
2012	Russian Open	(Japan) Shizuka Uchida	21–19, 21–12	(gold) Winner	

BWF Grand Prix tournament

=== BWF International Challenge/Series ===
Women's singles
Year	Tournament	Opponent	Score	Result	Ref.
2011	Banuinvest International	(Japan) Minatsu Mitani	14–21, 16–21	(silver) Runner-up	
2012	Osaka International	(Japan) Sayaka Takahashi	20–22, 19–21	(silver) Runner-up	
2013	Austrian International	(Bulgaria) Petya Nedelcheva	21–11, 21–3	(gold) Winner	
2014	Osaka International	(Japan) Anna Doi	21–13, 21–14	(gold) Winner	
2017	Polish Open	(Malaysia) Lee Ying Ying	13–21, 21–19, 21–10	(gold) Winner	

BWF International Challenge tournament
BWF International Series tournament
